= List of Chinese football transfers winter 2022 =

This is a list of Chinese football transfers for the 2022 season winter transfer window.

== Super League ==
=== Beijing Guoan ===
In:

No.	Pos.	Nation	Player
5	DF	BIH	Samir Memišević (loan from Hebei)
11	FW	NGA	Samuel Adegbenro (from (Sweden) IFK Norrköping)
17	DF	KOR	Kang Sang-woo (from (South Korea) Pohang Steelers)
28	MF	CHN	Zhang Chengdong (from Hebei)
29	FW	CHN	Tian Yuda (from Shandong Taishan)
30	FW	CRO	Marko Dabro (from (Croatia) Lokomotiva)
-	FW	CHN	Ba Dun (loan return from Tianjin Jinmen Tiger)
-	FW	CHN	Wen Da (loan return from Beijing BSU)

Out:

No.	Pos.	Nation	Player
4	DF	CHN	Li Lei (to (Switzerland) Grasshopper)
11	FW	BRA	Anderson Silva (Released)
17	FW	COD	Cédric Bakambu (to (France) Marseille)
24	DF	CHN	Yang Fan (loan to Tianjin Jinmen Tiger)
28	FW	CHN	He Zhenyu (loan return to (England) Wolverhampton Wanderers)
29	DF	CHN	Jiang Tao (Released)
-	FW	CHN	Ba Dun (to Tianjin Jinmen Tiger)
-	FW	CHN	Wen Da (to Wuhan)

=== Cangzhou Mighty Lions ===
In:

No.	Pos.	Nation	Player
3	DF	CHN	Cao Haiqing (from Nanjing City)
9	FW	SRB	Stefan Mihajlovic (from Guizhou)
19	MF	CHN	Wang Chengkuai (loan from Shenzhen)
21	DF	CHN	Jiang Zhe (from Chongqing Liangjiang Athletic)
28	DF	CHN	Yang Xiaotian (from Guangzhou City)
37	FW	CHN	Anwar Memet-Ali (from Guizhou)
-	FW	CHN	Liu Ziming (loan return from Zibo Cuju)
-	MF	CHN	Tan Xiang (loan return from Beijing BIT)

Out:

No.	Pos.	Nation	Player
1	GK	CHN	Zhang Zhenqiang (to Wuhan)
10	FW	BRA	Muriqui (to (Brazil) Avaí)
11	MF	CHN	Xie Pengfei (to Wuhan Three Towns)
18	MF	CHN	Zheng Zhiyun (to Changchun Yatai)
19	DF	CHN	Liao Chengjian (to Changchun Yatai)
24	MF	CHN	Abduhamit Abdugheni (to Chengdu Rongcheng)
25	MF	UZB	Odil Ahmedov (Retired)
28	FW	SEN	André Senghor (Released)
35	MF	CHN	Hu Shengjia (to Wuxi Wugou)
-	FW	CHN	Zhao Yubo (to Shijiazhuang Gongfu)
-	FW	CHN	Liu Ziming (loan to Liaoning Shenyang Urban)
-	MF	CHN	Tan Xiang (to Guangxi Pingguo Haliao)

=== Changchun Yatai ===
In:

No.	Pos.	Nation	Player
1	GK	CHN	Liu Weiguo (from Guangzhou)
3	DF	CHN	Han Pengfei (from Wuhan)
7	FW	RSA	Dino Ndlovu (from (Turkey) Kocaelispor)
8	MF	CHN	Wang Jinxian (from Dalian Pro)
16	MF	CHN	Zheng Zhiyun (from Cangzhou Mighty Lions)
19	DF	CHN	Liao Chengjian (from Cangzhou Mighty Lions)
-	GK	CHN	He Zijian (from Heilongjiang Ice City)
-	MF	CHN	Zhou Dadi (loan return from Heilongjiang Ice City)
-	MF	CHN	Zhao Mingyu (loan return from Nanjing City)
-	DF	CHN	Zhu Mingxin (loan return from Jiangxi Beidamen)
-	MF	CHN	Han Zilong (loan return from Hebei Zhuoao)
-	DF	CHN	He Wei (loan return from Kunming Zheng He Shipman)

Out:

No.	Pos.	Nation	Player
16	DF	CHN	Jiang Zhe (loan return to Chongqing Liangjiang Athletic)
17	MF	TPE	Chen Po-Liang (to Qingdao Youth Island)
25	MF	CHN	Wang Peng (loan return to Shenzhen)
26	FW	CHN	Yang Chaosheng (to Meizhou Hakka)
28	GK	CHN	Shi Xiaotian (to Chongqing Liangjiang Athletic)
30	MF	CHN	Sun Qinhan (loan return to Shanghai Shenhua)
33	MF	CHN	Wang Jie (to Nantong Zhiyun)
-	DF	CHN	Xu Xiao (to Shijiazhuang Gongfu)
-	MF	CHN	Zhou Dadi (to Sichuan Jiuniu)
-	MF	CHN	Zhao Mingyu (to Nanjing City)
-	DF	CHN	Zhu Mingxin (loan to Guangxi Pingguo Haliao)
-	MF	CHN	Han Zilong (to Zibo Cuju)
-	DF	CHN	He Wei (to Shijiazhuang Gongfu)

=== Chengdu Rongcheng ===
In:

No.	Pos.	Nation	Player
-	GK	CHN	Geng Xiaofeng (from Hebei)
-	MF	TPE	Tim Chow (from Henan Songshan Longmen)
-	DF	CHN	Abduhamit Abdugheni (from Cangzhou Mighty Lions)
-	DF	CHN	Hu Jing (from Heilongjiang Ice City)
-	DF	CHN	Hu Ruibao (from Guangzhou City)
-	MF	CHN	Gan Chao (from Shenzhen)
-	MF	KOR	Kim Min-woo (from (South Korea) Suwon Samsung Bluewings)
-	DF	AUT	Richard Windbichler (from (South Korea) Seongnam FC)
-	FW	BRA	Johnathan (loan return from (South Korea) Gwangju FC)
-	FW	CHN	Ma Xiaolei (loan return from Sichuan Minzu)
-	GK	CHN	Li Shi (loan return from Hunan Billows)
-	MF	CHN	Zhang Jingyang (loan return from Sichuan Minzu)
-	MF	CHN	Gong Hankui (loan return from Beijing BIT)
-	DF	CHN	Li Shanglin (loan return from Shanxi Longjin)
-	DF	CHN	Luo Xin (loan return from Sichuan Minzu)

Out:

No.	Pos.	Nation	Player
4	DF	CHN	Yang Zexiang (loan return to Shanghai Shenhua)
8	MF	CHN	Liu Ruofan (loan return to Shanghai Shenhua)
9	FW	BRA	Naldinho (to Chongqing Liangjiang Athletic)
12	MF	CHN	Li Zhi (loan to Kunshan)
13	DF	CHN	Han Xuan (loan to Shaanxi Chang'an Athletic)
19	MF	CHN	Tang Miao (loan to Zibo Cuju)
23	MF	CHN	He Xin (loan to Shaanxi Chang'an Athletic)
30	MF	CHN	Liu Chaoyang (loan return to Shandong Taishan)
39	MF	CHN	Gan Chao (loan return to Shenzhen)
-	FW	CHN	Mu Yiming (loan to Shijiazhuang Gongfu)
-	FW	CHN	Ma Xiaolei (loan to Sichuan Jiuniu)
-	GK	CHN	Li Shi (Retired)
-	MF	CHN	Zhang Jingyang (to Heilongjiang Ice City)
-	MF	CHN	Gong Hankui (loan to Nantong Zhiyun)
-	DF	CHN	Li Shanglin (loan to Jinan Xingzhou)
-	DF	CHN	Luo Xin (loan to Shijiazhuang Gongfu)

=== Guangzhou ===
In:

No.	Pos.	Nation	Player
-	FW	CHN	Afrden Asqer (from Suzhou Dongwu)
-	MF	CHN	Li Yang (from (Portugal) Gondomar)
-	DF	CHN	Liang Peiwen (from Hubei Istar)
-	GK	CHN	Zhang Yulei (loan return from Qingdao Youth Island)
-	GK	CHN	Mai Gaoling (loan return from Beijing BSU)
-	MF	CHN	Feng Boxuan (loan return from Henan Songshan Longmen)
-	FW	CHN	Parmanjan Kyum (loan return from Henan Songshan Longmen)
-	MF	CHN	Deng Yubiao (loan return from Suzhou Dongwu)
-	DF	CHN	Yang Zhaohui (loan return from Suzhou Dongwu)
-	DF	CHN	Guo Jing (loan return from Suzhou Dongwu)
-	DF	CHN	Liu Yiming (loan return from Wuhan Three Towns)
-	MF	CHN	Zhang Yujie (loan return from Hubei Istar)

Out:

No.	Pos.	Nation	Player
3	DF	CHN	Mei Fang (Retired)
5	DF	CHN	Zhang Linpeng (to Shanghai Port)
6	MF	CHN	Liao Lisheng (to Shandong Taishan)
9	FW	CHN	Elkeson (Released)
11	MF	BRA	Ricardo Goulart (to (Brazil) Santos)
13	GK	CHN	Liu Weiguo (to Changchun Yatai)
18	FW	CHN	Alan Carvalho (Released)
19	FW	BRA	Fernandinho (Released)
21	DF	CHN	Gao Zhunyi (to Wuhan Three Towns)
25	DF	CHN	Deng Hanwen (to Wuhan Three Towns)
32	GK	CHN	Liu Dianzuo (to Wuhan Three Towns)
33	MF	CHN	Zhong Yihao (to Henan Songshan Longmen)
36	MF	CHN	He Chao (to Wuhan Three Towns)
37	FW	CHN	Aloísio (to (Brazil) América Mineiro)
68	MF	CHN	Liao Jintao (to Kunshan)
-	GK	CHN	Li Yuefeng (to Tianjin Jinmen Tiger)
-	FW	CHN	Ershidin Pahardin (to Xinjiang Tianshan Leopard)
-	MF	CHN	Xie Zifeng (to Shijiazhuang Gongfu)
-	GK	CHN	Zhang Yulei (to Qingdao Youth Island)
-	GK	CHN	Mai Gaoling (to Meizhou Hakka)
-	MF	CHN	Feng Boxuan (to Henan Songshan Longmen)
-	FW	CHN	Parmanjan Kyum (loan to Henan Songshan Longmen)
-	MF	CHN	Deng Yubiao (to Chongqing Liangjiang Athletic)
-	DF	CHN	Yang Zhaohui (to Chongqing Liangjiang Athletic)
-	DF	CHN	Guo Jing (to Qingdao Youth Island)
-	DF	CHN	Liu Yiming (to Wuhan Three Towns)
-	MF	CHN	Zhang Yujie (to Kunshan)

=== Guangzhou City ===
In:

No.	Pos.	Nation	Player
-	MF	CHN	Chen Fuhai (loan return from Qingdao Youth Island)
-	DF	CHN	Zou Zheng (loan return from Qingdao)

Out:

No.	Pos.	Nation	Player
5	DF	CHN	Hu Ruibao (to Chengdu Rongcheng)
9	FW	BRA	Tiago Leonço (to (Japan) JEF United Chiba)
15	DF	CHN	Han Pengfei (loan return to Wuhan)
27	DF	CHN	Yang Xiaotian (to Cangzhou Mighty Lions)
35	DF	CHN	Wang Huapeng (to Chongqing Liangjiang Athletic)
-	MF	CHN	Chen Fuhai (to Qingdao Youth Island)
-	DF	CHN	Zou Zheng (to Sichuan Jiuniu)

=== Hebei ===
In:

No.	Pos.	Nation	Player
-	DF	CHN	Ren Hang (loan return from Wuhan Three Towns)
-	MF	CHN	Zu Pengchao (loan return from Shaanxi Chang'an Athletic)
-	MF	CHN	Chen Ao (loan return from Qingdao Youth Island)
-	GK	CHN	Geng Xiaofeng (loan return from Wuhan Three Towns)
-	MF	CHN	Luo Senwen (loan return from Wuhan Three Towns)
-	MF	CHN	Zhao Yuhao (loan return from Henan Songshan Longmen)
-	MF	CHN	Merdanjan Abduklijan (loan return from Qingdao Youth Island)
-	MF	CHN	Ma Bokang (loan return from Shaoxing Keqiao Yuejia)

Out:

No.	Pos.	Nation	Player
4	DF	CHN	Lei Tenglong (Retired)
5	DF	BIH	Samir Memišević (loan to Beijing Guoan)
6	MF	NOR	Ole Selnæs (loan return to Shenzhen)
9	MF	CHN	Gong Qiule (to Kunshan)
11	MF	CHN	Hu Rentian (to Wuhan)
13	MF	CHN	Yin Hongbo (to Meizhou Hakka)
14	MF	CHN	Feng Gang (to Shaanxi Chang'an Athletic)
15	MF	CHN	Wang Qiuming (to Tianjin Jinmen Tiger)
19	MF	CHN	Li Hao (Released)
22	GK	CHN	Chi Wenyi (Released)
23	FW	POR	João Silva (Released)
26	DF	CHN	Jiang Wenjun (to Kunshan)
28	MF	CHN	Zhang Chengdong (to Beijing Guoan)
29	DF	CHN	Chen Xiao (to Jiangxi Beidamen)
35	MF	CHN	Jin Qiang (loan return to Shenzhen)
40	MF	CHN	Zhang Hui (to Wuhan Three Towns)
45	FW	BRA	Léo Souza (loan return to Shandong Taishan)
-	DF	CHN	Ren Hang (to Wuhan Three Towns)
-	MF	CHN	Zu Pengchao (to Tianjin Jinmen Tiger)
-	MF	CHN	Chen Ao (to Qingdao Youth Island)
-	GK	CHN	Geng Xiaofeng (to Chengdu Rongcheng)
-	MF	CHN	Luo Senwen (to Wuhan Three Towns)
-	MF	CHN	Zhao Yuhao (to Henan Songshan Longmen)
-	MF	CHN	Merdanjan Abduklijan (loan to Qingdao Youth Island)
-	MF	CHN	Ma Bokang (loan to Xinjiang Tianshan Leopard)

=== Henan Songshan Longmen ===
In:

No.	Pos.	Nation	Player
-	MF	CHN	Huang Zichang (from Wuhan)
-	MF	POL	Adrian Mierzejewski (from Chongqing Liangjiang Athletic)
-	MF	CHN	Zhong Yihao (from Guangzhou)
-	DF	CHN	Zhao Honglüe (from Wuhan)
-	DF	CHN	Yang Shuai (from Chongqing Liangjiang Athletic)
-	MF	CHN	Feng Boxuan (from Guangzhou)
-	FW	CHN	Parmanjan Kyum (loan from Guangzhou)
-	MF	CHN	Zhao Yuhao (from Hebei)
-	DF	CHN	Zhang Wentao (loan return from Wuhan Three Towns)

Out:

No.	Pos.	Nation	Player
3	MF	CHN	Zhao Yuhao (loan return to Hebei)
8	MF	TPE	Tim Chow (to Chengdu Rongcheng)
12	MF	CHN	Chen Pu (loan return to Shandong Taishan)
13	DF	CHN	Abduwali Ablet (Released)
16	FW	CHN	Parmanjan Kyum (loan return to Guangzhou)
17	GK	CHN	Wu Yan (to Shaanxi Chang'an Athletic)
18	MF	CHN	Yang Guoyuan (to Heilongjiang Ice City)
20	MF	CHN	Feng Boxuan (loan return to Guangzhou)
22	MF	CHN	Song Boxuan (Released)
25	FW	CHN	Chen Hao (Released)
29	MF	BRA	Ivo (Released)
36	MF	CHN	Ahmat Tursunjan (loan return to Hubei Istar)
-	FW	CHN	Ouyang Bang (to Shijiazhuang Gongfu)
-	DF	CHN	Zhang Wentao (to Wuhan Three Towns)

=== Meizhou Hakka ===
In:

No.	Pos.	Nation	Player
6	DF	CHN	Liao Junjian (from Wuhan)
10	MF	CHN	Yin Hongbo (from Hebei)
15	DF	CHN	Chen Zhechao (from Shandong Taishan)
16	FW	CHN	Yang Chaosheng (from Changchun Yatai)
19	MF	CHN	Yang Yilin (from Shandong Taishan)
20	DF	SRB	Rade Dugalić (from (Kazakhstan) Kairat)
21	MF	CHN	Wang Wei (from Qingdao)
25	MF	BRA	Rodrigo Henrique (from (Bulgaria) Cherno More)
27	MF	MNE	Nebojša Kosović (from (Kazakhstan) Kairat)
30	MF	CHN	Li Shuai (from Heilongjiang Ice City)
33	DF	CHN	Liu Sheng (from Wuhan Three Towns)
39	FW	SRB	Aleksa Vukanović (from (Serbia) Red Star Belgrade)
-	GK	CHN	Mai Gaoling (from Guangzhou)
-	GK	CHN	Deng Xiongtao (from Shanghai Shenhua)
-	DF	CHN	Zhang Sijie (from Meixian Qiuxiang)

Out:

No.	Pos.	Nation	Player
1	GK	CHN	Li Xinyu (to Liaoning Shenyang Urban)
6	DF	CHN	Ge Zhen (loan return to Shenzhen)
9	FW	BRA	Igor Sartori (Released)
19	FW	CHN	Gui Hong (loan return to Guangzhou City)
21	MF	CHN	Tang Shi (loan return to Guangzhou)
24	DF	CHN	Yang Wenji (to Jiangxi Beidamen)
31	MF	CHN	Su Shihao (loan return to Shanghai Shenhua)
32	MF	CHN	Xu Lei (loan return to Shanghai Shenhua)
33	DF	CHN	Liu Sheng (loan return to Wuhan Three Towns)
-	MF	CHN	Liang Weipeng (to Suzhou Dongwu)

=== Shandong Taishan ===
In:

No.	Pos.	Nation	Player
-	DF	BRA	Jadson (from (Portugal) Portimonense)
-	FW	BRA	Crysan (from (Portugal) Santa Clara)
-	MF	CHN	Liao Lisheng (from Guangzhou)
-	DF	HUN	Tamás Kádár (loan return from Tianjin Jinmen Tiger)
-	FW	BRA	Leonardo (loan return from Hebei)
-	FW	CHN	Shi Yan (loan return from Tianjin Jinmen Tiger)
-	DF	CHN	Li Songyi (loan return from Tianjin Jinmen Tiger)
-	FW	CHN	Zhang Tong (loan return from Inner Mongolia Caoshangfei)
-	FW	CHN	Tian Yuda (loan return from Beijing BSU)
-	FW	CHN	Xie Wenneng (loan return from Qingdao Hainiu)
-	MF	CHN	Wu Xingyu (loan return from Qingdao Hainiu)
-	DF	CHN	Wu Lei (loan return from Nanjing City)
-	MF	CHN	Liu Chaoyang (loan return from Chengdu Rongcheng)
-	FW	CHN	Ji Shengpan (loan return from Beijing BSU)
-	MF	CHN	Cao Sheng (loan return from Qingdao Hainiu)

Out:

No.	Pos.	Nation	Player
3	DF	CHN	Liu Junshuai (loan to Qingdao Hainiu)
4	DF	BRA	Jadson (loan return to (Portugal) Portimonense)
7	FW	CHN	Guo Tianyu (loan to (Portugal) Vizela)
8	MF	CHN	Xu Xin (to Shanghai Port)
20	DF	CHN	Chen Zhechao (to Meizhou Hakka)
29	FW	CHN	Cheng Yuan (to Jinan Xingzhou)
-	MF	CHN	Yang Yilin (to Meizhou Hakka)
-	MF	CHN	Zhang Xingliang (to Tianjin Jinmen Tiger)
-	MF	CHN	Li Mingfan (to Wuhan Three Towns)
-	DF	CHN	Abdurahman Abdukiram (to Wuhan Three Towns)
-	MF	CHN	Abduhelil Osmanjan (to Wuhan Three Towns)
-	MF	CHN	Fu Hao (to Shenzhen)
-	DF	CHN	Elkut Eysajan (to Dalian Pro)
-	MF	CHN	Zhang Yuanshu (loan to Zibo Cuju)
-	DF	CHN	Liu Wenhao (to Jiangxi Beidamen)
-	DF	CHN	Subi Ablimit (to Jiangxi Beidamen)
-	MF	CHN	Ma Shuai (to Zibo Cuju)
-	DF	HUN	Tamás Kádár (to (Hungary) Újpest)
-	FW	BRA	Leonardo (loan to (South Korea) Ulsan Hyundai)
-	FW	CHN	Shi Yan (to Tianjin Jinmen Tiger)
-	DF	CHN	Li Songyi (to Kunshan)
-	FW	CHN	Zhang Tong (to Qingdao Hainiu)
-	FW	CHN	Tian Yuda (to Beijing Guoan)
-	FW	CHN	Xie Wenneng (to Qingdao Hainiu)
-	MF	CHN	Wu Xingyu (to Shenzhen)
-	DF	CHN	Wu Lei (loan to Suzhou Dongwu)
-	MF	CHN	Liu Chaoyang (loan to Shaanxi Chang'an Athletic)
-	FW	CHN	Ji Shengpan (to Zibo Cuju)
-	MF	CHN	Cao Sheng (loan to Qingdao Hainiu)

=== Shanghai Port ===
In:

No.	Pos.	Nation	Player
-	MF	CHN	Xu Xin (from Shandong Taishan)
-	FW	SEN	Cherif Ndiaye (from (Turkey) Göztepe)
-	DF	CHN	Zhang Linpeng (from Guangzhou)
-	DF	CHN	Wei Lai (loan return from Kunshan)
-	MF	CHN	Lei Wenjie (loan return from Nantong Zhiyun)
-	DF	CHN	Yang Zihao (loan return from Tianjin Jinmen Tiger)
-	DF	CHN	Zhu Jiayi (loan return from Nanjing City)

Out:

No.	Pos.	Nation	Player
3	DF	CHN	Yu Rui (loan to Kunshan)
18	MF	CHN	Zhang Yi (loan to Tianjin Jinmen Tiger)
27	DF	CHN	Zhang Wei (loan to Tianjin Jinmen Tiger)
29	DF	CHN	Nie Meng (to Dandong Tengyue)
30	FW	CHN	Jia Boyan (to (Switzerland) Grasshopper)
31	MF	CHN	Gao Haisheng (to Zibo Cuju)
39	FW	CHN	Hu Jinghang (to Wuhan)
47	MF	CHN	Zhou Zheng (to Tianjin Jinmen Tiger)
-	DF	CHN	Wei Lai (to Nantong Zhiyun)
-	MF	CHN	Lei Wenjie (loan to Nantong Zhiyun)
-	DF	CHN	Yang Zihao (to Tianjin Jinmen Tiger)
-	DF	CHN	Zhu Jiayi (to Chongqing Liangjiang Athletic)

=== Shanghai Shenhua ===
In:

No.	Pos.	Nation	Player
-	MF	CHN	Xu Haoyang (loan return from Wuhan Three Towns)
-	DF	CHN	Li Peng (loan return from Qingdao)
-	FW	CHN	Sun Xipeng (loan return from Qingdao Youth Island)
-	MF	CHN	Lü Pin (loan return from Zibo Cuju)
-	FW	CHN	Gao Di (loan return from Zhejiang)
-	MF	CHN	Su Shihao (loan return from Meizhou Hakka)
-	FW	CHN	Song Runtong (loan return from Qingdao)

Out:

No.	Pos.	Nation	Player
9	MF	POL	Adrian Mierzejewski (loan return to Chongqing Liangjiang Athletic)
10	MF	COL	Giovanni Moreno (to (Colombia) Atlético Nacional)
14	FW	GUI	Lonsana Doumbouya (Released)
22	DF	CRO	Matej Jonjić (to (Japan) Cerezo Osaka)
27	GK	CHN	Li Shuai (Retired)
-	GK	CHN	Deng Xiongtao (to Meizhou Hakka)
-	MF	CHN	Cao Zhenquan (to Nanjing City)
-	MF	CHN	Xu Haoyang (loan to Wuhan Three Towns)
-	DF	CHN	Li Peng (to Wuhan)
-	FW	CHN	Sun Xipeng (to Chongqing Liangjiang Athletic)
-	MF	CHN	Lü Pin (loan to Guangxi Pingguo Haliao)
-	FW	CHN	Gao Di (to Zhejiang)
-	MF	CHN	Su Shihao (loan to Qingdao Youth Island)
-	FW	CHN	Song Runtong (loan to Qingdao Youth Island)

=== Shenzhen ===
In:

No.	Pos.	Nation	Player
5	DF	KOR	Lim Chai-min (from (South Korea) Gangwon)
10	MF	FRA	Romain Alessandrini (from Qingdao)
17	MF	CHN	Fu Hao (from Shandong Taishan)
23	MF	CHN	Wu Xingyu (from Shandong Taishan)
24	GK	CHN	Dong Chunyu (from Wuhan)
27	DF	CHN	Yang Boyu (from Wuhan)
35	DF	CHN	Lu Wentao (Free agent)
-	DF	CHN	Ge Zhen (loan return from Meizhou Hakka)
-	FW	CMR	John Mary (loan return from (Japan) Avispa Fukuoka)
-	FW	CGO	Thievy Bifouma (loan return from Heilongjiang Ice City)
-	DF	CHN	Lü Haidong (loan return from Wuhan Three Towns)
-	MF	CHN	Gan Chao (loan return from Chengdu Rongcheng)
-	MF	CHN	Wang Chengkuai (loan return from Zibo Cuju)

Out:

No.	Pos.	Nation	Player
10	MF	COL	Juan Fernando Quintero (loan to (Argentina) River Plate)
24	DF	CHN	Zhou Xin (loan to Suzhou Dongwu)
27	FW	BRA	Alan Kardec (Released)
33	DF	CHN	Chen Guoliang (loan to Liaoning Shenyang Urban)
-	DF	CHN	Wang Hansheng (to Zibo Cuju)
-	DF	CHN	Ge Zhen (to Qingdao Youth Island)
-	FW	CMR	John Mary (to (Saudi Arabia) Al Shabab)
-	FW	CGO	Thievy Bifouma (to (Turkey) Bursaspor)
-	DF	CHN	Lü Haidong (to Wuhan Three Towns)
-	MF	CHN	Gan Chao (to Chengdu Rongcheng)
-	MF	CHN	Wang Chengkuai (loan to Cangzhou Mighty Lions)

=== Tianjin Jinmen Tiger ===
In:

No.	Pos.	Nation	Player
1	GK	CHN	Li Yuefeng (from Guangzhou)
2	DF	ESP	David Andújar (from (Spain) Cartagena)
4	DF	CHN	Yang Fan (loan from Beijing Guoan)
9	FW	SVN	Robert Berić (from (United States) Chicago Fire)
12	MF	CHN	Gui Zihan (from Liaoning Shenyang Urban)
14	MF	CHN	Zu Pengchao (from Hebei)
15	FW	CRO	Dejan Radonjić (from Qingdao)
16	DF	CHN	Yang Zihao (from Shanghai Port)
17	MF	CHN	Zhou Zheng (from Shanghai Port)
18	MF	BRA	Farley Rosa (from (Israel) Hapoel Tel Aviv)
21	MF	CHN	Zhang Xingliang (from Shandong Taishan)
25	GK	CHN	Yan Bingliang (Free agent)
27	DF	CHN	Zhang Wei (loan from Shanghai Port)
29	FW	CHN	Ba Dun (from Beijing Guoan)
30	MF	CHN	Wang Qiuming (from Hebei)
31	MF	CHN	Tian Yinong (from Wuhan)
40	FW	CHN	Shi Yan (from Shandong Taishan)
-	GK	CHN	Xu Jiamin (from Dalian Pro)
-	MF	CHN	Zhang Yi (loan from Shanghai Port)

Out:

No.	Pos.	Nation	Player
3	DF	CHN	Li Songyi (loan return to Shandong Taishan)
12	MF	BRA	Magno Cruz (loan return to Jiangxi Beidamen)
21	DF	CHN	Jin Yangyang (loan return to Shanghai Shenhua)
24	MF	CHN	Piao Taoyu (to Chongqing Liangjiang Athletic)
29	FW	CHN	Ba Dun (loan return to Beijing Guoan)
30	MF	CHN	Fan Xuyang (loan return to Hubei Istar)
31	MF	CHN	Chen Kerui (loan return to Shandong Taishan)
37	DF	CHN	Yang Zihao (loan return to Shanghai Port)
39	MF	CHN	Cong Zhen (loan return to Shanghai Shenhua)
40	FW	CHN	Shi Yan (loan return to Shandong Taishan)
44	DF	HUN	Tamás Kádár (loan return to Shandong Taishan)

=== Wuhan Three Towns ===
In:

No.	Pos.	Nation	Player
-	DF	BRA	Wallace (from (Turkey) Yeni Malatyaspor)
-	MF	BRA	Davidson (from (Turkey) Alanyaspor)
-	MF	ROU	Nicolae Stanciu (from (Czech Republic) Slavia Prague)
-	DF	CHN	Deng Hanwen (from Guangzhou)
-	GK	CHN	Liu Dianzuo (from Guangzhou)
-	MF	CHN	He Chao (from Guangzhou)
-	DF	CHN	Gao Zhunyi (from Guangzhou)
-	MF	CHN	Tao Qianglong (from Dalian Pro)
-	MF	CHN	Zhang Hui (from Hebei)
-	MF	CHN	Xie Pengfei (from Cangzhou Mighty Lions)
-	MF	CHN	He Tongshuai (from Dongguan United)
-	DF	CHN	Shewketjan Tayir (from Xinjiang Snowland Tiancheng)
-	DF	CHN	Liu Yiming (from Guangzhou)
-	MF	CHN	Xu Haoyang (loan from Shanghai Shenhua)
-	DF	CHN	Zhang Wentao (from Henan Songshan Longmen)
-	DF	CHN	Ren Hang (from Hebei)
-	DF	CHN	Lü Haidong (from Shenzhen)
-	MF	CHN	Luo Senwen (from Hebei)
-	DF	CHN	Liu Sheng (loan return from Meizhou Hakka)
-	MF	CHN	Li Mingfan (from Shandong Taishan)
-	DF	CHN	Abdurahman Abdukiram (from Shandong Taishan)
-	MF	CHN	Abduhelil Osmanjan (from Shandong Taishan)

Out:

No.	Pos.	Nation	Player
14	DF	CHN	Rong Hao (to Zhejiang)
15	MF	CHN	Nie Aoshuang (to Wuhan)
17	MF	CHN	Liu Yue (loan return to Shenzhen)
19	DF	CHN	Zhang Wentao (loan return to Henan Songshan Longmen)
20	FW	NGA	Moses Ogbu (to (South Korea) Pohang Steelers)
21	GK	CHN	Geng Xiaofeng (loan return to Hebei)
23	DF	CHN	Ren Hang (loan return to Hebei)
30	MF	CHN	Xu Yue (loan return to Shenzhen)
31	MF	CHN	Luo Senwen (loan return to Hebei)
32	DF	CHN	Lü Haidong (loan return to Shenzhen)
33	DF	CHN	Xiao Weijie (loan to Hainan Star)
36	DF	CHN	Zhao Shuhao (to Nantong Zhiyun)
37	MF	CHN	Xu Haoyang (loan return to Shanghai Shenhua)
38	MF	CHN	Caysar Adiljan (loan to Suzhou Dongwu)
39	FW	CHN	Liu Yiheng (loan to Hainan Star)
42	DF	CHN	Liu Yiming (loan return to Guangzhou)
-	DF	CHN	Liu Sheng (to Meizhou Hakka)
-	MF	CHN	Li Mingfan (loan to Hainan Star)
-	DF	CHN	Abdurahman Abdukiram (loan to Hainan Star)
-	MF	CHN	Abduhelil Osmanjan (loan to Hainan Star)

=== Wuhan Yangtze River ===
In:

No.	Pos.	Nation	Player
-	FW	CRC	Felicio Brown Forbes (from (Poland) Wisła Kraków)
-	MF	MNE	Asmir Kajević (from (Serbia) Čukarički)
-	DF	BRA	Bruno Viana (from (Portugal) Braga)
-	GK	CHN	Zhang Zhenqiang (from Cangzhou Mighty Lions)
-	DF	CHN	Li Peng (from Shanghai Shenhua)
-	MF	CHN	Hu Rentian (from Hebei)
-	DF	CHN	Xu Dong (from Heilongjiang Ice City)
-	FW	CHN	Wang Jingbin (from Liaoning Shenyang Urban)
-	MF	CHN	Hu Jiali (from Qingdao)
-	MF	CHN	Zhang Huajun (from Hebei Zhuoao)
-	FW	CHN	Wen Da (from Beijing Guoan)
-	FW	CHN	Hu Jinghang (from Shanghai Port)
-	MF	CHN	Nie Aoshuang (from Wuhan Three Towns)
-	DF	CHN	Han Xuan (from Shaanxi Chang'an Athletic)
-	DF	CHN	Nihat Nihmat (from Hubei Istar)
-	DF	CHN	Li Da (from Hubei Istar)
-	DF	CHN	Li Yueming (loan return from Hubei Istar)
-	DF	CHN	Han Pengfei (loan return from Guangzhou City)

Out:

No.	Pos.	Nation	Player
3	DF	CHN	Zhao Honglüe (to Henan Songshan Longmen)
5	MF	CHN	Tian Yinong (to Tianjin Jinmen Tiger)
8	MF	CHN	Yao Hanlin (Retired)
9	FW	BRA	Rafael Silva (to (Brazil) Cruzeiro)
11	MF	CHN	Huang Zichang (to Henan Songshan Longmen)
13	FW	CHN	Dong Xuesheng (loan to Shaanxi Chang'an Athletic)
16	GK	CHN	Dong Chunyu (to Shenzhen)
17	FW	CIV	Jean Evrard Kouassi (to (Turkey) Trabzonspor)
18	FW	CHN	Fang Hao (loan return to Shandong Taishan)
19	MF	CHN	Keweser Xamixidin (loan return to (Portugal) Gondomar)
21	MF	CHN	Li Yang (loan return to (Portugal) Gondomar)
22	DF	CHN	Liao Junjian (to Meizhou Hakka)
27	DF	CHN	Yang Boyu (to Shenzhen)
35	GK	CHN	Guo Jiawei (loan return to Hubei Istar)
44	FW	BRA	Anderson Lopes (to (Japan) Yokohama F. Marinos)
45	DF	CHN	Lin Guoyu (loan return to Shandong Taishan)
-	MF	CHN	Zhang Muzi (to Guangxi Pingguo Haliao)
-	DF	CHN	Wu Yujie (to Jiangxi Beidamen)
-	DF	CHN	Song Zhiwei (to Dalian Pro)
-	DF	CHN	Li Yueming (to Qingdao Youth Island)
-	DF	CHN	Han Pengfei (to Changchun Yatai)

=== Zhejiang ===
In:

No.	Pos.	Nation	Player
-	DF	BRA	Lucas Possignolo (from (Portugal) Portimonense)
-	FW	CMR	Donovan Ewolo (from Heilongjiang Ice City)
-	DF	CHN	Rong Hao (from Wuhan Three Towns)
-	DF	CHN	Zheng Xuejian (from Nanjing City)
-	MF	CHN	Zhang Jiaqi (from Sichuan Jiuniu)
-	FW	CHN	Gao Di (from Shanghai Shenhua)
-	MF	CHN	Sun Haosheng (loan return from Hebei Zhuoao)
-	FW	CHN	He Jian (loan return from Hebei Zhuoao)
-	GK	CHN	Fan Jinming (loan return from Sichuan Jiuniu)

Out:

No.	Pos.	Nation	Player
9	FW	CHN	Gao Di (loan return to Shanghai Shenhua)
13	FW	CHN	Shao Renzhe (to Nanjing City)
17	MF	CHN	Li Wei (Retired)
18	FW	CHN	Tan Yang (Retired)
21	MF	CHN	Cui Ren (Retired)
23	DF	CHN	Xu Xiaolong (Retired)
29	MF	CHN	Yi Xianlong (loan return to Shandong Taishan)
-	MF	CHN	Li Jiahao (to Dalian Pro)
-	MF	CHN	Sun Haosheng (Retired)
-	FW	CHN	He Jian (to Hefei City)
-	GK	CHN	Fan Jinming (loan to Xinjiang Tianshan Leopard)

== League One ==
=== Beijing BIT ===
In:

No.	Pos.	Nation	Player

Out:

No.	Pos.	Nation	Player
2	MF	CHN	Gong Hankui (loan return to Chengdu Rongcheng)
7	MF	CHN	Tan Xiang (loan return to Cangzhou Mighty Lions)
20	MF	CHN	Zhan Minwei (loan return to Cangzhou Mighty Lions)

=== Beijing BSU ===
In:

No.	Pos.	Nation	Player

Out:

No.	Pos.	Nation	Player
5	FW	CHN	Zhang Shuai (to Zibo Cuju)
7	FW	CHN	Ji Shengpan (loan return to Shandong Taishan)
9	FW	CHN	Tian Yuda (loan return to Shandong Taishan)
12	FW	TPE	Wen Chih-hao (Released)
17	FW	CHN	Wen Da (loan return to Beijing Guoan)
19	MF	CHN	Xie Zhiwei (loan return to Nanjing City)
20	MF	CHN	Xu Borui (to Guangxi Pingguo Haliao)
21	MF	CHN	Bu Xin (to Heilongjiang Ice City)
24	GK	CHN	Mai Gaoling (loan return to Guangzhou)
25	GK	CHN	Jiang Hao (to Dalian Duxing)
26	DF	CHN	Cui Zhongkai (to Dalian Duxing)
28	DF	CHN	Zhang Zhihao (loan return to Guangzhou)
29	FW	CHN	Zhang Jiansheng (loan return to Dalian Pro)
30	MF	CHN	Liu Zipeng (to Jiangxi Beidamen)
31	DF	CHN	Liao Lei (loan return to Shenzhen)
33	MF	CHN	Yan Xiangchuang (to Dalian Pro)
38	DF	CHN	Yang Pengju (loan return to Dalian Pro)
42	MF	CHN	Zheng Bofan (loan return to Dalian Pro)

=== Dalian Pro ===
In:

No.	Pos.	Nation	Player
-	DF	CHN	Song Zhiwei (from Wuhan)
-	MF	CHN	Shang Yin (from Jiangxi Beidamen)
-	MF	CHN	Fei Yu (from Nantong Zhiyun)
-	MF	CHN	Ning Hao (from Liaoning Shenyang Urban)
-	DF	CHN	Lin Longchang (from Guizhou)
-	MF	CHN	Lü Peng (from Qingdao)
-	FW	CHN	Zhu Ting (from Qingdao)
-	MF	CHN	Yan Xiangchuang (from Beijing BSU)
-	MF	CHN	Chen Chenzhenyang (from Beijing Wanda)
-	MF	CHN	Zhong Yunxing (from (Spain) Real Avilés B)
-	DF	CHN	Elkut Eysajan (from Shandong Taishan)
-	MF	CHN	Li Jiahao (from Zhejiang)
-	GK	CHN	Li Xuebo (loan return from Zibo Cuju)

Out:

No.	Pos.	Nation	Player
7	MF	CHN	Zhao Xuri (to Sichuan Jiuniu)
12	GK	CHN	Xu Jiamin (to Tianjin Jinmen Tiger)
20	MF	CHN	Wang Jinxian (to Changchun Yatai)
24	MF	CHN	Tao Qianglong (to Wuhan Three Towns)
25	MF	BRA	Jailson (to (Brazil) Palmeiras)
31	MF	CHN	Zheng Long (to Qingdao Hainiu)
37	MF	CHN	Yang Haoyu (loan return to Hubei Istar)
40	DF	CHN	Zhu Jiaxuan (loan to Liaoning Shenyang Urban)
-	MF	CHN	Chen Rong (loan to Liaoning Shenyang Urban)
-	MF	CHN	Chen Zhinan (to Guangxi Pingguo Haliao)
-	MF	CHN	Zhang Zimin (to Nanjing City)
-	GK	CHN	Li Xuebo (loan to Zibo Cuju)

=== Guangxi Pingguo Haliao ===
In:

No.	Pos.	Nation	Player
-	DF	ESP	David Mateos (from (Bolivia) The Strongest)
-	FW	SRB	Mladen Kovačević (from (Serbia) Radnički Niš)
-	FW	HKG	Sandro (Free agent)
-	DF	CHN	Yao Diran (from Shanxi Longjin)
-	GK	CHN	Dong Yifan (from Zibo Cuju)
-	DF	CHN	Wang Zihao (from Xiamen Egret Island)
-	MF	CHN	Tan Xiang (from Cangzhou Mighty Lions)
-	DF	CHN	Lin Jiahao (from Guizhou)
-	DF	CHN	Zhu Mingxin (loan from Changchun Yatai)
-	GK	CHN	Shen Bokai (from Jiangxi Dark Horse Junior)
-	GK	CHN	Zhao Yongxi (from Liuzhou Ranko)
-	MF	CHN	Lü Pin (loan from Shanghai Shenhua)
-	DF	CHN	Wang Dalong (from Nanjing City)
-	MF	CHN	Xie Weichao (from Liaoning Shenyang Urban)
-	FW	CHN	Yu Haoyang (from Liaoning Shenyang Urban)
-	FW	CHN	Wu Linfeng (from Liaoning Shenyang Urban)
-	DF	CHN	Yin Lu (from Hebei Zhuoao)
-	GK	CHN	Liang Junjie (from Guizhou Qianshan Xiushui)
-	FW	CHN	Lü Weichen (from Zhuhai Qin'ao)
-	MF	CHN	Yang Yu (from Qingdao)
-	MF	CHN	Li Xiaoting (from Jiangxi Beidamen)
-	MF	CHN	Chen Zhinan (from Dalian Pro)
-	MF	CHN	Xu Borui (from Beijing BSU)
-	MF	CHN	Zhang Muzi (from Wuhan)
-	MF	CHN	Jiang Xianshan (from Liuzhou Ranko)

Out:

No.	Pos.	Nation	Player
8	MF	CHN	Chen Zeng (loan return to Cangzhou Mighty Lions)
14	DF	CHN	Han Tianlin (to Liaoning Shenyang Urban)
17	DF	CHN	Yang Shukai (loan return to Changchun Yatai)
18	MF	CHN	Du Guanyang (to Guangxi Lanhang)
25	MF	CHN	Luo Tian (to Guangxi Lanhang)
31	DF	CHN	Liu Xiaolong (loan return to Meizhou Hakka)
39	MF	CHN	Cui Jiaqi (to Tianjin Hopeful)
45	MF	CHN	Ke Ziang (loan return to Wuhan Three Towns)

=== Heilongjiang Ice City ===
In:

No.	Pos.	Nation	Player
-	GK	CHN	Liu Peng (from Shanghai Jiading Huilong)
-	MF	CHN	Li Zhongting (from Liaoning Shenyang Urban)
-	DF	CHN	Zhang Haochen (from Qingdao)
-	MF	CHN	Bu Xin (from Beijing BSU)
-	FW	BRA	Dominic Vinicius (from (Denmark) Vejle)
-	FW	CHN	Yu Shuai (from Shaanxi Chang'an Athletic)
-	DF	CHN	Liu Jianye (from Xiamen Egret Island)
-	FW	CHN	Lei Yongchi (from Xiamen Egret Island)
-	GK	CHN	Zhang Luhao (from Xiamen Egret Island)
-	MF	CHN	Cheng Xianfeng (loan from Kunshan)
-	DF	CHN	Tu Dongxu (from Kunshan)
-	FW	CHN	Wang Jinpeng (from Xiamen Egret Island)
-	MF	CHN	Chen Yunhan (from Xiamen Egret Island)
-	MF	CHN	Yang Guoyuan (from Henan Songshan Longmen)
-	MF	CHN	Zhang Jingyang (from Chengdu Rongcheng)
-	FW	CMR	Franck Ohandza (Free agent)
-	GK	CHN	Wang Chongyu (from Ulanqab Qile)
-	GK	CHN	Liu Shilong (from Shanghai Jiading Huilong)

Out:

No.	Pos.	Nation	Player
1	GK	CHN	Lu Ning (to Sichuan Jiuniu)
6	DF	CHN	Zhang Hao (to Kunshan)
7	FW	CMR	Donovan Ewolo (to Zhejiang)
9	FW	CHN	Yan Peng (to Dalian Duxing)
10	MF	CHN	Li Shuai (to Meizhou Hakka)
11	FW	CHN	Pan Chaoran (to Qingdao Youth Island)
13	MF	CHN	Zhou Dadi (loan return to Changchun Yatai)
17	MF	CHN	Yang Lei (to Sichuan Jiuniu)
19	FW	CGO	Thievy Bifouma (loan return to Shenzhen)
20	DF	CHN	Hu Jing (to Chengdu Rongcheng)
24	DF	CHN	Chico Chen (loan return to (Portugal) Cova da Piedade)
27	MF	CHN	Chen Yi (to Sichuan Jiuniu)
28	MF	CHN	Pan Yuchen (to Qingdao Hainiu)
30	MF	CHN	Nizamdin Ependi (to Sichuan Jiuniu)
31	MF	CHN	Bai Zijian (to Zibo Cuju)
32	DF	CHN	Liu Yi (to Shaanxi Chang'an Athletic)
33	DF	CHN	Xu Dong (to Wuhan)
34	MF	CHN	Xu Yang (to Shaanxi Chang'an Athletic)
45	DF	CHN	Liu Xinyu (to Sichuan Jiuniu)
-	GK	CHN	He Zijian (to Changchun Yatai)

=== Jiangxi Beidamen ===
In:

No.	Pos.	Nation	Player
-	DF	CHN	Liu Yulei (from Shaoxing Keqiao Yuejia)
-	DF	CHN	Baqyjan Hurman (from Zibo Cuju)
-	DF	CHN	Li Jiawei (from Suzhou Dongwu)
-	DF	CHN	Mustahan Mijit (from Jiangxi Beidamen)
-	MF	CHN	Yu Jianfeng (from Nantong Zhiyun)
-	MF	CHN	Liu Zefeng (from Kunshan)
-	MF	CHN	Lin Zefeng (from Shanxi Longjin)
-	DF	CHN	Subi Ablimit (from Shandong Taishan)
-	DF	CHN	Liu Wenhao (from Shandong Taishan)
-	MF	CHN	Liu Zipeng (from Beijing BSU)
-	DF	CHN	Wu Yujie (from Wuhan)
-	MF	CHN	Tan Binliang (from Nanjing City)
-	DF	CHN	Yang Wenji (from Meizhou Hakka)
-	DF	CHN	Chen Xiao (from Hebei)
-	FW	CHN	Deng Jiaxing (from Chongqing Liangjiang Athletic)
-	DF	CHN	Zhang Xiang (from Chongqing Liangjiang Athletic)
-	FW	CHN	Erpan Ezimjan (from Qingdao)
-	GK	CHN	Fan Weixiang (from Chongqing Liangjiang Athletic)
-	FW	BRA	Weslley (from (Brazil) América de Natal)
-	FW	BRA	Gileard (from (Oman) Bahla Club)
-	MF	BRA	Magno Cruz (loan return from Tianjin Jinmen Tiger)

Out:

No.	Pos.	Nation	Player
5	DF	CHN	Zhu Mingxin (loan return to Changchun Yatai)
6	DF	CHN	Zhang Kaiming (to Dalian Duxing)
7	MF	CHN	Shang Yin (to Dalian Pro)
8	FW	CHN	Zhang Ye (to Zibo Cuju)
10	FW	BRA	Éder (to Chongqing Liangjiang Athletic)
11	MF	CHN	Li Xiaoting (to Guangxi Pingguo Haliao)
15	DF	CHN	Zhou Yuye (to Wuxi Wugou)
23	DF	HKG	Andy Russell (to Sichuan Jiuniu)
25	MF	CHN	Yang Siping (to Lijiang 07 United)
26	DF	CHN	Liu Yuchen (to Dalian Duxing)
29	MF	CHN	Yan Ge (to Hefei City)
31	MF	CHN	Wu Minfeng (to Guangxi Lanhang)
32	FW	ALB	Vasil Shkurti (to (Albania) Kukësi)

=== Kunshan ===
In:

No.	Pos.	Nation	Player
1	GK	CHN	Lin Xiang (Free agent)
3	DF	CHN	Jiang Wenjun (from Hebei)
4	DF	CHN	Wang Hao (from Qingdao)
5	DF	CHN	Zhang Hao (from Heilongjiang Ice City)
7	FW	SRB	Nemanja Čović (from (Serbia) Vojvodina)
15	DF	CHN	Yu Rui (loan from Shanghai Port)
16	MF	CHN	Li Zhi (loan from Chengdu Rongcheng)
18	MF	CHN	Gong Qiule (from Hebei)
24	DF	CHN	Li Songyi (from Shandong Taishan)
27	DF	CHN	Wang Tianci (from Xiamen Egret Island)
30	MF	CHN	Zhang Yujie (from Guangzhou)
36	MF	CHN	Liao Jintao (from Guangzhou)

Out:

No.	Pos.	Nation	Player
1	GK	CHN	Chen Anqi (Released)
3	DF	CHN	Zhang Chenglin (loan return to Guangzhou)
7	MF	CHN	Xiao Taotao (loan return to Guangzhou)
14	MF	CHN	Liu Zefeng (to Jiangxi Beidamen)
27	DF	CHN	Tu Dongxu (to Heilongjiang Ice City)
32	DF	CHN	Wei Lai (loan return to Shanghai Port)
33	MF	CHN	Cai Mingmin (loan return to Guangzhou)
36	MF	CHN	Cheng Xianfeng (loan to Heilongjiang Ice City)

=== Liaoning Shenyang Urban ===
In:

No.	Pos.	Nation	Player
-	GK	CHN	Gao Tian (from Dongguan United)
-	MF	CHN	Li Chi (from Kunming Zheng He Shipman)
-	MF	CHN	Luo Andong (from Jinan Xingzhou)
-	DF	CHN	Han Tianlin (from Guangxi Pingguo Haliao)
-	FW	CHN	Han Jiabao (from Shanxi Longjin)
-	DF	CHN	Liu Wenqing (from Hebei Zhuoao)
-	FW	SRB	Uroš Tomović (from Xinjiang Tianshan Leopard)
-	DF	CHN	Fang Zhengyang (from Jiangxi Dark Horse Junior)
-	MF	CHN	Chen Xin (from Xi'an Wolves)
-	MF	CHN	Fu Chengchen (from Hunan Billows)
-	DF	CHN	Jiang Feng (from Guizhou)
-	DF	CHN	Chen Long (from Guizhou)
-	FW	CHN	Liu Ziming (loan from Cangzhou Mighty Lions)
-	DF	CHN	Zhu Jiaxuan (loan from Dalian Pro)
-	MF	CHN	Chen Rong (loan from Dalian Pro)
-	DF	CHN	Chen Guoliang (loan from Shenzhen)
-	FW	CHN	Ezimet Ekrem (from Liaoning Leading)
-	GK	CHN	Wu Jiongde (Free agent)
-	GK	CHN	Li Xinyu (from Meizhou Hakka)
-	FW	CMR	Messi Bouli (loan return from Nanjing City)

Out:

No.	Pos.	Nation	Player
2	DF	CHN	Yu Jiawei (to Suzhou Dongwu)
5	DF	CHN	Ji Zhengyu (to Dalian Duxing)
8	MF	CHN	Xie Weichao (to Guangxi Pingguo Haliao)
15	MF	CHN	Gui Zihan (to Tianjin Jinmen Tiger)
16	MF	CHN	Zhu Shiyu (to Qingdao Hainiu)
18	MF	CHN	Liu Jiawei (to Wuhan Jiangcheng)
19	FW	CHN	Wang Jingbin (to Wuhan Yangtze River)
20	MF	CHN	Muhta Muzapar (to Sichuan Jiuniu)
24	MF	CHN	Du Junpeng (to Qingdao Youth Island)
25	DF	CHN	Sun Fabo (to Qingdao Youth Island)
26	MF	CHN	Ning Hao (to Dalian Pro)
29	FW	CHN	Men Yang (to Suzhou Dongwu)
30	MF	CHN	Zhang Wu (to Wuxi Wugou)
34	FW	CHN	Wu Linfeng (to Guangxi Pingguo Haliao)
35	MF	CHN	Li Zhongting (to Heilongjiang Ice City)
-	FW	CHN	Yu Haoyang (to Guangxi Pingguo Haliao)
-	MF	CHN	Ma Mingao (to Yanbian Longding)
-	FW	CMR	Messi Bouli (to Nanjing City)

=== Nanjing City ===
In:

No.	Pos.	Nation	Player
6	MF	CHN	Zhao Mingyu (from Changchun Yatai)
13	FW	CHN	Shao Renzhe (from Zhejiang)
16	MF	CHN	Zhang Zimin (from Dalian Pro)
18	MF	CHN	Ni Yin (from Xi'an Wolves)
19	FW	NGA	Chris Shimbayev (from (Nigeria) Galaxy Sports Academy)
22	MF	CHN	Xie Zhiwei (loan return from Beijing BSU)
27	DF	CHN	Chen Zepeng (from Sichuan Minzu)
28	FW	CMR	Messi Bouli (from Liaoning Shenyang Urban)
36	MF	CHN	Cao Zhenquan (from Shanghai Shenhua)
40	DF	SRB	Nemanja Vidić (from Sichuan Jiuniu)
-	MF	CHN	Li Liangliang (loan return from Shaoxing Keqiao Yuejia)
-	MF	CHN	Tan Binliang (loan return from Shanxi Longjin)

Out:

No.	Pos.	Nation	Player
10	DF	CHN	Chen Fangzhou (to Sichuan Jiuniu)
22	DF	CHN	Wu Lei (loan return to Shandong Taishan)
23	MF	CHN	Sun Enming (loan return to Shanghai Port)
24	DF	ALB	Albi Alla (loan return to Shaanxi Chang'an Athletic)
26	DF	CHN	Xu Jizu (loan return to Zhejiang)
27	DF	CHN	Zheng Xuejian (to Zhejiang)
28	FW	CMR	Messi Bouli (loan return to Liaoning Shenyang Urban)
30	MF	CHN	Zhao Mingyu (loan return to Changchun Yatai)
31	DF	CHN	Wang Dalong (to Guangxi Pingguo Haliao)
32	MF	CHN	Tao Yuan (to Sichuan Jiuniu)
33	DF	CHN	Cao Haiqing (to Cangzhou Mighty Lions)
35	DF	CHN	Wang Haozhi (to Zibo Cuju)
37	DF	LVA	Ritus Krjauklis (to (Latvia) Daugavpils)
40	DF	CHN	Zhu Jiayi (loan return to Shanghai Port)
-	MF	CHN	Li Liangliang (to Nantong Zhiyun)
-	MF	CHN	Tan Binliang (to Jiangxi Beidamen)

=== Nantong Zhiyun ===
In:

No.	Pos.	Nation	Player
3	MF	CHN	Wang Jie (from Changchun Yatai)
17	FW	CHN	Memet-Abdulla Ezmat (from Qingdao)
19	MF	CHN	Gong Hankui (loan from Chengdu Rongcheng)
27	MF	CHN	Li Liangliang (from Nanjing City)
28	DF	CHN	Zhao Shuhao (from Wuhan Three Towns)
33	DF	CHN	Wei Lai (from Shanghai Port)
39	MF	CHN	Lei Wenjie (loan from Shanghai Port)

Out:

No.	Pos.	Nation	Player
3	DF	CHN	Zhang Tianlong (to Qingdao Hainiu)
8	MF	CHN	Fei Yu (to Dalian Pro)
10	FW	BRA	Mychell Chagas (Released)
17	MF	CHN	Yu Jianfeng (to Jiangxi Beidamen)
39	MF	CHN	Lei Wenjie (loan return to Shanghai Port)

=== Qingdao Hainiu ===
In:

No.	Pos.	Nation	Player
3	DF	CHN	Zhang Tianlong (from Nantong Zhiyun)
4	DF	CHN	Liu Junshuai (loan from Shandong Taishan)
6	MF	CHN	Pan Yuchen (from Heilongjiang Ice City)
10	FW	NGA	Kingsley Onuegbu (from Shaanxi Chang'an Athletic)
12	MF	CHN	Cao Sheng (loan from Shandong Taishan)
24	MF	BFA	Adama Guira (from (Spain) Racing Rioja)
27	MF	CHN	Zheng Long (from Dalian Pro)
29	MF	CHN	Zhu Shiyu (from Liaoning Shenyang Urban)
30	DF	MLI	Ibrahim Kane (from (Ukraine) Vorskla Poltava)
36	FW	CHN	Zhang Tong (from Shandong Taishan)
41	FW	CHN	Xie Wenneng (from Shandong Taishan)
-	MF	CHN	Wang Zongzhe (from Shanxi Longjin)

Out:

No.	Pos.	Nation	Player
4	MF	CHN	Xue Ya'nan (loan return to Changchun Yatai)
9	MF	CHN	Wang Xiufu (to Guangxi Hengchen)
12	MF	CHN	Cao Sheng (loan return to Shandong Taishan)
37	MF	CHN	Yao Jiangshan (Retired)
41	FW	CHN	Xie Wenneng (loan return to Shandong Taishan)
55	MF	CHN	Wu Xingyu (loan return to Shandong Taishan)

=== Qingdao Youth Island ===
In:

No.	Pos.	Nation	Player
-	GK	CHN	Liu Zhenli (from Qingdao)
-	FW	BRA	Jaílton Paraíba (from (Japan) Tokyo Verdy)
-	MF	CMR	Hervaine Moukam (from (Kazakhstan) Aktobe)
-	FW	GNB	Valdu Té (from (Japan) FC Imabari)
-	MF	TPE	Chen Po-Liang (from Changchun Yatai)
-	FW	CHN	Song Runtong (loan from Shanghai Shenhua)
-	MF	CHN	Su Shihao (loan from Shanghai Shenhua)
-	MF	CHN	Merdanjan Abduklijan (loan from Hebei)
-	FW	CHN	Pan Chaoran (from Heilongjiang Ice City)
-	DF	CHN	Guo Jing (from Guangzhou)
-	DF	CHN	Li Yueming (from Wuhan)
-	DF	CHN	Sun Fabo (from Liaoning Shenyang Urban)
-	DF	CHN	Liu Pujin (from Xiamen Egret Island)
-	DF	CHN	Fang Xinfeng (from Qingdao)
-	DF	CHN	Ma Sheng (from Guangxi Huaqiangu)
-	MF	CHN	Du Junpeng (from Liaoning Shenyang Urban)
-	MF	CHN	Chen Fuhai (from Guangzhou City)
-	GK	CHN	Zhang Yulei (from Guangzhou)
-	MF	CHN	Chen Ao (from Hebei)
-	DF	CHN	Ge Zhen (from Shenzhen)

Out:

No.	Pos.	Nation	Player
13	MF	CHN	Chen Fuhai (loan return to Guangzhou City)
15	MF	CHN	Merdanjan Abduklijan (loan return to Hebei)
17	FW	CHN	Sun Xipeng (loan return to Shanghai Shenhua)
20	DF	CHN	Wang Xingqiang (loan return to Wuhan Three Towns)
21	MF	CHN	Hao Minhui (to Zhejiang TMS)
32	MF	CHN	Ju Feng (loan return to Guangzhou)
40	MF	CHN	Chen Ao (loan return to Hebei)
41	GK	CHN	Zhang Yulei (loan return to Guangzhou)
47	DF	CHN	Liao Jiajun (loan return to Guangzhou City)
52	MF	CHN	Liao Haochuan (loan return to Shanghai Shenhua)
59	FW	CHN	Luo Shipeng (loan return to Hebei)
60	FW	CHN	Lu Yongtao (loan return to Shandong Taishan)

=== Shaanxi Chang'an Athletic ===
In:

No.	Pos.	Nation	Player
-	GK	CHN	Wu Yan (from Henan Songshan Longmen)
-	MF	CHN	Feng Gang (from Hebei)
-	DF	CHN	Liu Yi (from Heilongjiang Ice City)
-	DF	CHN	Liu Jiashen (from Qingdao)
-	MF	CHN	He Xin (loan from Chengdu Rongcheng)
-	MF	CHN	Xu Yang (from Heilongjiang Ice City)
-	DF	CHN	Han Xuan (loan from Chengdu Rongcheng)
-	MF	ROU	Ronaldo Deaconu (from (Romania) Gaz Metan Mediaș)
-	MF	CHN	Liu Chaoyang (loan from Shandong Taishan)
-	FW	CHN	Dong Xuesheng (loan from Wuhan)
-	DF	CHN	Gu Wenjie (from Shenzhen FA)
-	MF	CHN	Ding Jie (loan from Chongqing Liangjiang Athletic)
-	GK	CHN	Zhong Zexian (from Shenzhen FA)

Out:

No.	Pos.	Nation	Player
3	DF	CHN	Han Xuan (to Wuhan)
6	MF	CHN	Ding Jie (loan return to Chongqing Liangjiang Athletic)
10	FW	NGA	Kingsley Onuegbu (to Qingdao Hainiu)
14	MF	CHN	Zu Pengchao (loan return to Hebei)
21	MF	CHN	Wang Jianwen (loan return to Qingdao)
28	FW	CHN	Yu Shuai (to Heilongjiang Ice City)
29	GK	CHN	Song Zhenyu (Retired)

=== Shijiazhuang Gongfu ===
In:

No.	Pos.	Nation	Player
-	FW	CHN	Ouyang Bang (from Henan Songshan Longmen)
-	DF	CHN	He Wei (from Changchun Yatai)
-	FW	CHN	Lu Jiabin (from Shanghai Jiading Huilong)
-	DF	CHN	Pan Kui (from Shanxi Longjin)
-	MF	CHN	Li Zhongyi (from Inner Mongolia Caoshangfei)
-	MF	CHN	Xie Zifeng (from Guangzhou)
-	FW	CHN	Mu Yiming (loan from Chengdu Rongcheng)
-	DF	CHN	Luo Xin (loan from Chengdu Rongcheng)
-	GK	CHN	Sui Weijie (from Shanxi Longjin)
-	MF	CHN	Nan Xiaoheng (loan from Sichuan Jiuniu)
-	GK	CHN	Chen Zhao (loan from Chongqing Liangjiang Athletic)
-	FW	AUS	Daniel Wong (Free agent)
-	DF	CHN	Xu Xiao (from Changchun Yatai)
-	DF	CHN	Huang Jiajun (from Sichuan Minzu)
-	MF	CHN	Zhou Minghao (from Sichuan Jiuniu)
-	MF	CHN	Wang Lingke (from Kunming Zheng He Shipman)
-	MF	CHN	Wang Song (from Sichuan Jiuniu)
-	FW	CHN	Zhao Yubo (from Cangzhou Mighty Lions)

Out:

No.	Pos.	Nation	Player
16	DF	CHN	Wang Xin (to Guangxi Yong City)
17	MF	CHN	Li Diantong (loan return to Liaoning Shenyang Urban)
29	MF	CHN	Wang Song (loan return to Sichuan Jiuniu)
33	MF	CHN	He Yuxuan (to Tianjin Shengde)
56	MF	CHN	Sun Longxiang (loan return to Henan Songshan Longmen)
57	MF	CHN	He Yuchen (loan return to Kunming Zheng He Shipman)

=== Sichuan Jiuniu ===
In:

No.	Pos.	Nation	Player
-	DF	CHN	Liu Xinyu (from Heilongjiang Ice City)
-	MF	CHN	Tao Yuan (from Nanjing City)
-	DF	HKG	Andy Russell (from Jiangxi Beidamen)
-	MF	CHN	Yang Lei (from Heilongjiang Ice City)
-	MF	CHN	Zhao Xuri (from Dalian Pro)
-	GK	CHN	Lu Ning (from Heilongjiang Ice City)
-	FW	CHN	Ma Xiaolei (loan from Chengdu Rongcheng)
-	DF	CHN	Zou Zheng (from Guangzhou City)
-	FW	ESP	Edu García (from (India) Hyderabad)
-	DF	ESP	Hernán Santana (from (India) NorthEast United)
-	GK	CHN	Zhao Shi (from Qingdao)
-	MF	CHN	Zhou Dadi (from Changchun Yatai)
-	FW	ESP	Jorge Ortiz (from (India) Goa)
-	MF	CHN	Ma Canjie (from Guizhou)
-	MF	CHN	Li Jinqing (from (Spain) Villarrobledo)
-	MF	CHN	Nizamdin Ependi (from Heilongjiang Ice City)
-	MF	CHN	Muhta Muzapar (from Liaoning Shenyang Urban)
-	DF	CHN	Chen Fangzhou (from Nanjing City)
-	MF	CHN	Chen Yi (from Heilongjiang Ice City)
-	DF	CHN	Chen Shuo (from Shanghai Genbao)
-	MF	CHN	Wang Song (loan return from Shijiazhuang Gongfu)

Out:

No.	Pos.	Nation	Player
1	GK	CHN	Zhao Heng (Released)
3	DF	CHN	Long Cheng (loan return to Zhejiang)
4	MF	CHN	Wang Qiao (loan to Chongqing Liangjiang Athletic)
8	FW	AUS	Pierce Waring (from (Australia) Bentleigh Greens)
9	MF	CHN	Nan Xiaoheng (loan to Shijiazhuang Gongfu)
15	MF	CHN	Wei Jingzong (loan return to Zhejiang)
16	DF	CHN	Liu Jing (loan return to Hebei)
17	MF	CHN	Li Jiahe (Released)
19	FW	GUI	Mohamed Yattara (Released)
20	MF	CHN	Zheng Shengxiong (loan return to Guangzhou)
21	MF	CHN	Nan Song (to Chongqing Liangjiang Athletic)
25	GK	CHN	Lu Zheyu (to Tianjin Fusheng)
29	MF	CHN	Zhang Jiaqi (to Zhejiang)
31	DF	CHN	Lü Wei (to Tianjin Fusheng)
35	GK	CHN	Fan Jinming (loan return to Zhejiang)
40	DF	SRB	Nemanja Vidić (to Nanjing City)
-	DF	CHN	Zheng Yu (Released)
-	MF	CHN	Zhou Minghao (to Shijiazhuang Gongfu)
-	MF	CHN	Wang Song (to Shijiazhuang Gongfu)

=== Suzhou Dongwu ===
In:

No.	Pos.	Nation	Player
-	DF	CHN	Yu Jiawei (from Liaoning Shenyang Urban)
-	FW	CHN	Xu Chunqing (from Wuxi Wugou)
-	FW	CHN	Men Yang (from Liaoning Shenyang Urban)
-	DF	CHN	Liu Hao (from Guizhou)
-	GK	CHN	Guo Jiawei (loan from Hubei Istar)
-	MF	CHN	Liang Weipeng (from Meizhou Hakka)
-	DF	CHN	Wu Lei (loan from Shandong Taishan)
-	DF	CHN	Zhou Xin (loan from Shenzhen)
-	MF	CHN	Caysar Adiljan (loan from Wuhan Three Towns)
-	DF	CHN	Yu Longyun (loan from Hubei Istar)

Out:

No.	Pos.	Nation	Player
2	DF	CHN	Li Jiawei (to Jiangxi Beidamen)
3	DF	CHN	Guo Jing (loan return to Guangzhou)
7	FW	CHN	Afrden Asqer (to Guangzhou)
8	MF	CHN	Deng Yubiao (loan return to Guangzhou)
14	DF	CHN	Xia Xicheng (to Wuxi Wugou)
16	DF	CHN	Li Shizhou (to Wuxi Wugou)
17	DF	CHN	Yang Zhaohui (loan return to Guangzhou)
18	DF	CHN	Zhang Cheng (to Tianjin Fusheng)
27	MF	CHN	Fan Xiaodong (to Zibo Cuju)
32	DF	CHN	Cao Dong (loan return to Chongqing Liangjiang Athletic)
34	FW	CHN	Huang Lei (loan return to Chongqing Liangjiang Athletic)

=== Xinjiang Tianshan Leopard ===
In:

No.	Pos.	Nation	Player
-	MF	CHN	Keweser Xamixidin (from (Portugal) Gondomar)
-	MF	CHN	Kamiran Halimurat (from Xinjiang Snowland Tiancheng)
-	FW	CHN	Qaharman Abdukerim (from Xinjiang Snowland Tiancheng)
-	DF	CHN	Nureli Tursunali (from Xinjiang Snowland Tiancheng)
-	GK	CHN	Ripat Ablitip (from Xinjiang Snowland Tiancheng)
-	MF	CHN	Wang Zhuo (from Jinan Xingzhou)
-	MF	CHN	Ahmat Tursunjan (loan from Hubei Istar)
-	MF	CHN	Hao Shijie (from Dandong Tengyue)
-	MF	CHN	Aysan Kadir (from Hubei Istar)
-	FW	CHN	Ershidin Pahardin (from Guangzhou)
-	MF	CHN	Ma Bokang (loan from Hebei)
-	DF	CHN	Ababekri Erkin (from Hainan Star)
-	GK	CHN	Fan Jinming (loan from Zhejiang)
-	DF	CHN	Ilzat Muhpul (from Xinjiang Snowland Tiancheng)

Out:

No.	Pos.	Nation	Player
1	GK	CHN	Salajidin Akramjan (to Yanbian Longding)
2	DF	CHN	Wu Hang (to Wuxi Wugou)
4	DF	CHN	Zheng Yiming (loan return to Beijing Guoan)
15	DF	CHN	Mustahan Mijit (to Jiangxi Beidamen)
21	MF	CHN	Dilxat Ablimit (to Chongqing Liangjiang Athletic)
35	DF	SRB	Nemanja Spasojević (to (Serbia) Radnički Sremska Mitrovica)
36	FW	SRB	Uroš Tomović (to Liaoning Shenyang Urban)
37	MF	CHN	Wu Chengru (loan return to Guangzhou City)
38	MF	CHN	Wang Peng (loan return to Guangzhou City)

=== Zibo Cuju ===
In:

No.	Pos.	Nation	Player
-	FW	CHN	Zhang Shuai (from Beijing BSU)
-	DF	CHN	Wang Hansheng (from Shenzhen)
-	FW	CHN	Zhang Ye (from Jiangxi Beidamen)
-	MF	CHN	Ma Shuai (from Shandong Taishan)
-	MF	CHN	Bai Zijian (from Heilongjiang Ice City)
-	DF	CHN	Wang Haozhi (from Nanjing City)
-	MF	CHN	Zhang Mengqi (from Guizhou)
-	GK	CHN	Wang Zhuo (from Guizhou)
-	MF	CHN	Han Zilong (from Changchun Yatai)
-	MF	CHN	Fan Xiaodong (from Suzhou Dongwu)
-	MF	CHN	Zhang Yuanshu (loan from Shandong Taishan)
-	DF	CHN	Liu Zhizhi (from Xi'an Wolves)
-	FW	CHN	Ji Shengpan (from Shandong Taishan)
-	DF	CHN	Sun Kai (loan from Chongqing Liangjiang Athletic)
-	MF	CHN	Zhang Xingbo (loan from Chongqing Liangjiang Athletic)
-	MF	CHN	Tang Miao (loan from Chengdu Rongcheng)
-	MF	CHN	Gao Haisheng (from Shanghai Port)
-	FW	CHN	Zhang Xiao (from Chongqing Liangjiang Athletic)
-	GK	CHN	Li Xuebo (loan from Dalian Pro)

Out:

No.	Pos.	Nation	Player
1	GK	CHN	Dong Yifan (to Guangxi Pingguo Haliao)
4	DF	CHN	Zhang Hongjiang (to Chongqing Liangjiang Athletic)
5	DF	CHN	Ötkür Hesen (loan return to Sichuan Jiuniu)
14	DF	CHN	Wei Renjie (loan return to Shaanxi Chang'an Athletic)
17	FW	CHN	Liu Ziming (loan return to Cangzhou Mighty Lions)
23	MF	CHN	Wang Chengkuai (loan return to Shenzhen)
24	MF	CHN	Quan Heng (to Dandong Tengyue)
30	MF	CHN	Ma Long (loan return to Qingdao)
32	GK	CHN	Li Xuebo (loan return to Dalian Pro)
33	MF	CHN	Jiang Yu (to Chongqing Liangjiang Athletic)
34	MF	CHN	Lü Pin (loan return to Shanghai Shenhua)
36	DF	CHN	Xu Yougang (loan return to Shanghai Shenhua)
37	FW	CHN	Jin Bo (loan return to Guangzhou City)
41	DF	CHN	Baqyjan Hurman (to Jiangxi Beidamen)
