= Li Xinyu =

Li Xinyu may refer to:

- Belinda Lee Xin Yu, Singaporean television host and actress
- Li Xinyu (footballer), Chinese footballer

== See also ==
- Liu Xinyu (disambiguation)
