= Ma Shuai =

Ma Shuai may refer to:

- Ma Shuai (footballer, born 1985)
- Ma Shuai (footballer, born 1998)
