= Luo Xin =

Luo Xin may refer to:

- Luo Xin (footballer, born 1990)
- Luo Xin (footballer, born 2000)
