= Subi Ablimit =

Chinese association football player

Personal information
- Date of birth: 13 February 2002 (age 24)
- Place of birth: Yining, Xinjiang, China
- Height: 1.77 m (5 ft 10 in)
- Position: Defender

Team information
- Current team: Guangxi Hengchen
- Number: 28

Youth career
- –2020: Shandong Taishan

Senior career*
Years	Team	Apps	(Gls)
2020–2021	Shandong Taishan	0	(0)
2020	→ China U19 (loan)	1	(0)
2021	→ China U20 (loan)	9	(0)
2022–2023	Jiangxi Lushan	44	(2)
2024	Heilongjiang Ice City	10	(0)
2025	Kunming City	27	(5)
2026–	Guangxi Hengchen	0	(0)

International career^{‡}
2022	China U-21	1	(0)
- * Club domestic league appearances and goals as of 21:54, 8 March 2026 (UTC) ‡ National team caps and goals as of 00:01, 25 December 2021 (UTC)

Subi Ablimit (Chinese: 苏毕·阿布力米提; born 13 February 2002) is a Chinese footballer currently playing as a defender for China League One club Guangxi Hengchen.

== Career statistics ==
=== Club ===
As of 25 December 2021.

Club	Season	League			Cup		Other		Total	
Club	Season	Division	Apps	Goals	Apps	Goals	Apps	Goals	Apps	Goals
Shandong Taishan	2020	Chinese Super League	0	0	0	0	0	0	0	0
Shandong Taishan	2021	Chinese Super League	0	0	0	0	0	0	0	0
Shandong Taishan	Total		0	0	0	0	0	0	0	0
China U19 (loan)	2020	China League Two	1	0	0	0	0	0	1	0
China U20 (loan)	2021	China League Two	9	0	2 (Note: Appearances in the Chinese FA Cup)	0	0	0	11	0
Career total			10	0	2	0	0	0	12	0
