= Parmanjan Kyum =

Chinese association football player

Personal information
- Date of birth: 1 February 2001 (age 25)
- Place of birth: Artush, Xinjiang, China
- Height: 1.72 m (5 ft 8 in)
- Position: Forward

Team information
- Current team: Guangzhou Dandelion Alpha

Youth career
- –2020: Guangzhou Evergrande

Senior career*
Years	Team	Apps	(Gls)
2020–2023	Guangzhou FC	30	(5)
2021	→ Henan SSLM (loan)	12	(1)
2022	→ Henan SSLM (loan)	10	(0)
2024	Shaanxi Union	10	(1)
2025-	Guangzhou Dandelion Alpha	0	(0)
- * Club domestic league appearances and goals as of 4 July 2024

Parmanjan Kyum (Chinese: 帕尔曼江·克尤木; born 1 February 2001) is a Chinese footballer who plays as a forward for China League Two club Guangzhou Dandelion Alpha.

== Club career ==
Parmanjan Kyum was promoted to the senior team of Guangzhou Evergrande (later renamed Guangzhou) during the 2020 Chinese Super League season and made his debut on 30 July 2020 in a league game against Guangzhou R&F, which his team won 5–0. After playing a handful of games for Guangzhou, he was loaned out to fellow top-tier club Henan Songshan Longmen in April 2021. He made his league debut for Henan on 21 April 2021 against Shenzhen in a 2–1 defeat, which was followed by his first goal for the club on 11 August 2021 against Guangzhou City in a 1–1 draw.

== Career statistics ==
As of 23 April 2023.

Appearances and goals by club, season and competition
Club	Season	League			National cup		Continental		Total	
Club	Season	Division	Apps	Goals	Apps	Goals	Apps	Goals	Apps	Goals
Guangzhou Evergrande; Guangzhou FC	2020	Chinese Super League	4	0	1	0	0	0	5	0
Guangzhou Evergrande; Guangzhou FC	2023	China League One	1	0	0	0	—		1	0
Guangzhou Evergrande; Guangzhou FC	Total		5	0	1	0	0	0	6	0
Henan SSLM (loan)	2021	Chinese Super League	12	1	2	0	—		14	1
Henan SSLM (loan)	2022	Chinese Super League	10	0	1	1	—		11	1
Henan SSLM (loan)	Total		22	1	3	1	0	0	25	2
Career total			27	1	4	1	0	0	31	2
