= Liu Xinyu (disambiguation) =

Liu Xinyu (born 1994) is a Chinese ice dancer.

Liu Xinyu may also refer to:

- Liu Xinyu (footballer, born 1991), Chinese forward
- Liu Xinyu (footballer, born 1999), Chinese midfielder
