= Mu Yiming =

Chinese association football player

Personal information
- Date of birth: 22 April 1999 (age 27)
- Place of birth: Dalian, Liaoning, China
- Height: 1.80 m (5 ft 11 in)
- Position: Midfielder

Youth career
- 2010–2017: Chengdu FA
- 2017: Chengdu Qbao
- 2018: Tubize

Senior career*
Years	Team	Apps	(Gls)
2018–2020	Tubize	0	(0)
2020–2022	Chengdu Rongcheng	0	(0)
2022	→ Shijiazhuang Gongfu (loan)	0	(0)

International career
2013–2016	China U17		
2017	China U19		
- * Club domestic league appearances and goals as of 17:14, 8 January 2023 (UTC)

Mu Yiming (Chinese: 牟壹铭; born 22 April 1999) is a Chinese footballer who plays as a midfielder.

== Club career ==
Born in Dalian, Liaoning, Mu started his career with the Chengdu FA in 2010. Trials with French team Metz and Spanish side Real Sociedad followed, before Mu eventually joined Belgian side Tubize in 2018.

On his return to China, he joined China League One side Chengdu Rongcheng. However, after three years with no appearances for the senior side, he was loaned to Shijiazhuang Gongfu in May 2022.

== International career ==
Mu has represented China from under-14 to under-19 level.

== Career statistics ==
=== Club ===
As of 8 January 2023.

Club	Season	League			Cup		Continental		Other		Total	
Club	Season	Division	Apps	Goals	Apps	Goals	Apps	Goals	Apps	Goals	Apps	Goals
Tubize	2018–19	Proximus League	0	0	1 (Note: Appearances in the Belgian Cup)	0	–		0	0	1	0
Tubize	2019–20	First Amateur Division	0	0	0	0	–		0	0	0	0
Tubize	Total		0	0	1	0	0	0	0	0	1	0
Chengdu Rongcheng	2020	China League One	0	0	0	0	–		0	0	0	0
Chengdu Rongcheng	2021	China League One	0	0	0	0	–		0	0	0	0
Chengdu Rongcheng	2022	Chinese Super League	0	0	0	0	–		0	0	0	0
Chengdu Rongcheng	Total		0	0	0	0	0	0	0	0	0	0
Shijiazhuang Gongfu (loan)	2022	China League One	0	0	1 (Note: Appearances in the Chinese FA Cup)	0	–		0	0	1	0
Career total			0	0	2	0	0	0	0	0	2	0
