= Zhang Yujie =

Chinese association football player

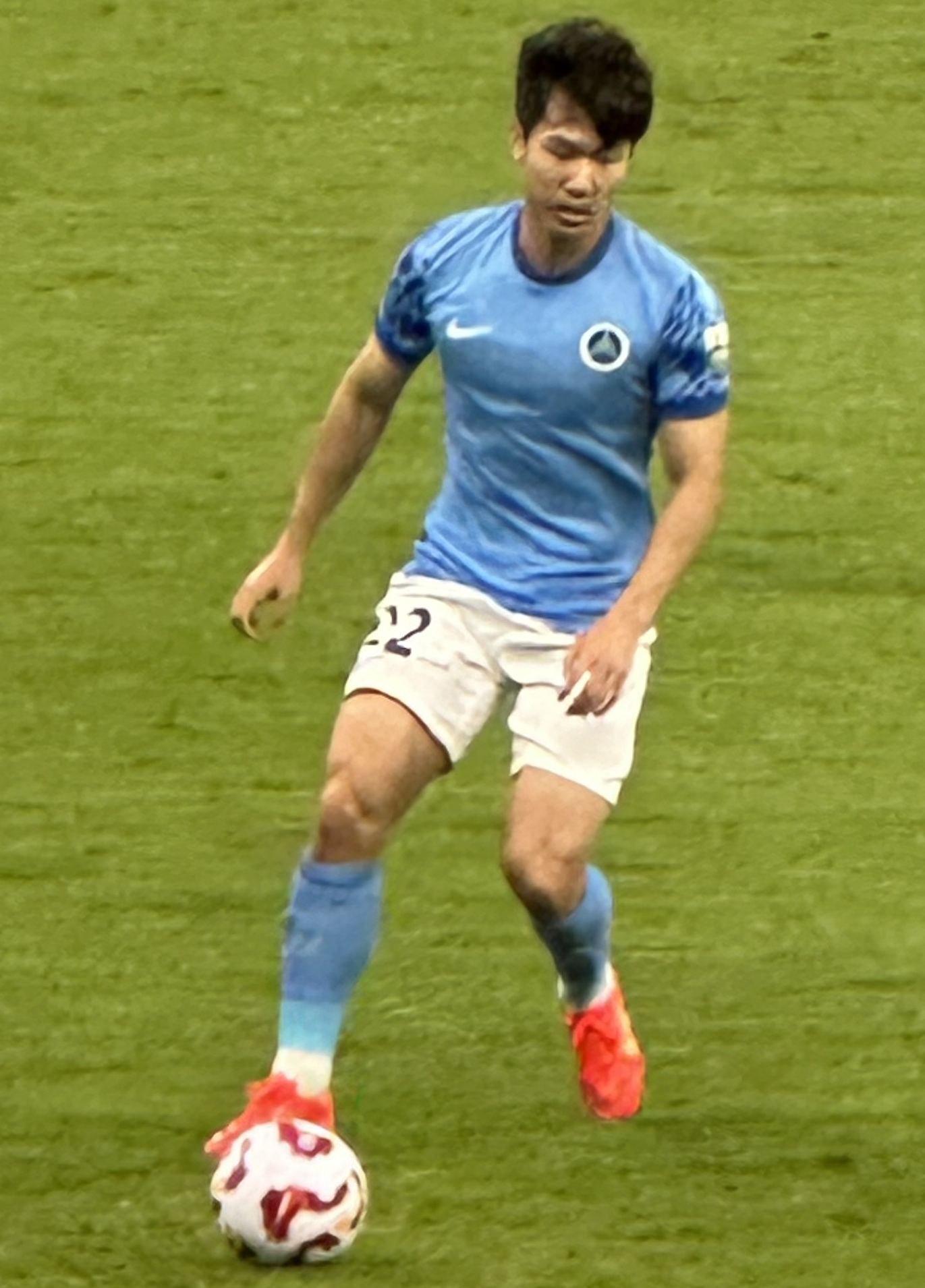
- Zhang Yujie in April 2025

Personal information
- Date of birth: 18 March 2002 (age 24)
- Place of birth: Jiujiang, Jiangxi, China
- Height: 1.77 m (5 ft 10 in)
- Position: Right-back

Team information
- Current team: Jiangxi Dingnan United (on loan from Shenzhen Peng City)
- Number: 2

Senior career*
Years	Team	Apps	(Gls)
2020–2021	Guangzhou FC	0	(0)
2021	→ Hubei Istar (loan)	6	(0)
2022	Kunshan FC	0	(0)
2022	→ Heilongjiang Ice City (loan)	15	(0)
2023–2024	Heilongjiang Ice City	53	(0)
2025–	Shenzhen Peng City	12	(2)
2026–	→ Jiangxi Dingnan United (loan)	0	(0)
- * Club domestic league appearances and goals as of 28 August 2025

Zhang Yujie (Chinese: 张昱杰; born 18 March 2002) is a Chinese footballer currently playing as a right-back for Jiangxi Dingnan United, on loan from Shenzhen Peng City.

== Career ==
=== Heilongjiang Ice City ===
On 19 April 2023, Zhang Yujie made a permanent move to China League One side Heilongjiang Ice City.

=== Shenzhen Peng City ===
On 19 January 2025, Zhang Yujie completed a transfer to Chinese Super League club Shenzhen Peng City. On 1 March 2025, he scored his first senior and professional goal in a 1–0 away win over Qingdao Hainiu in his first Chinese Super League start.

On 17 July 2026, Zhang re-joined Jiangxi Dingnan United by half-year loan from Shenzhen Peng City.

== Career statistics ==
=== Club ===
As of match played 31 December 2024.

Club	Season	League			Cup		Other		Total	
Club	Season	Division	Apps	Goals	Apps	Goals	Apps	Goals	Apps	Goals
Guangzhou FC	2020	Chinese Super League	0	0	1 (Note: Appearances in the Chinese FA Cup)	0	–		1	0
Hubei Istar (loan)	2021	China League Two	6	0	0	0	–		6	0
Kunshan FC	2022	China League One	0	0	1	0	–		1	0
Heilongjiang Ice City (loan)	2022	China League One	15	0	–		–		15	0
Heilongjiang Ice City	2023	China League One	28	0	1	0	–		29	0
Heilongjiang Ice City	2024	China League One	25	0	1	0	–		26	0
Heilongjiang Ice City	Total		68	0	2	0	0	0	70	0
Career total			74	0	4	0	0	0	78	0
