= Chen Yi (footballer) =

Chinese footballer (born 1997)

Personal information
- Date of birth: 1 June 1997 (age 29)
- Place of birth: Zhangjiakou, Hebei, China
- Height: 1.78 m (5 ft 10 in)
- Position: Midfielder

Team information
- Current team: Sichuan Youth Althetic
- Number: 21

Youth career
- –2011: Hubei FA
- 2012–2014: Changchun Yatai
- 2014–2015: Mafra
- 2015–2016: GS Loures
- 2016: → Cova da Piedade (youth loan)

Senior career*
| Years | Team | Apps | (Gls) |
| 2016–2017 | Atlético Malveira | 2 | (0) |
| 2017–2020 | Cova da Piedade | 1 | (0) |
| 2019 | Cova da Piedade II | 8 | (1) |
| 2017–2018 | → Tourizense (loan) | 4 | (0) |
| 2021 | Heilongjiang Ice City | 7 | (0) |
| 2022–2023 | Sichuan Jiuniu | 29 | (1) |
| 2024 | Heilongjiang Ice City | 5 | (0) |
| 2024 | Wuxi Wugo | 3 | (0) |
| 2025– | Sichuan Youth Althetic | 0 | (0) |

International career
| 2015 | China U18 | 1 | (0) |
- * Club domestic league appearances and goals as of 12:40, 20 July 2021 (UTC)

Chen Yi (simplified Chinese: 陈奕; traditional Chinese: 陳奕; pinyin: Chén Yì; born 1 June 1997) is a Chinese footballer currently playing for Chinese club Sichuan Youth Althetic.

== Career statistics ==
=== Club ===
As of 20 July 2021.

| Club | Season | League | | | National Cup | | League Cup | | Other | | Total | |
| Club | Season | Division | Apps | Goals | Apps | Goals | Apps | Goals | Apps | Goals | Apps | Goals |
|---|---|---|---|---|---|---|---|---|---|---|---|---|
| Atlético Malveira | 2016–17 | Campeonato de Portugal | 2 | 0 | 1 (Note: Appearances in the Taça de Portugal) | 0 | 0 | 0 | 0 | 0 | 3 | 0 |
| Cova da Piedade | 2017–18 | LigaPro | 0 | 0 | 0 | 0 | 0 | 0 | 0 | 0 | 0 | 0 |
| Cova da Piedade | 2018–19 | LigaPro | 1 | 0 | 0 | 0 | 1 (Note: Appearances in the Taça da Liga) | 0 | 0 | 0 | 2 | 0 |
| Cova da Piedade | 2019–20 | LigaPro | 0 | 0 | 0 | 0 | 0 | 0 | 0 | 0 | 0 | 0 |
| Cova da Piedade | Total | | 1 | 0 | 0 | 0 | 1 | 0 | 0 | 0 | 2 | 0 |
| Tourizense (loan) | 2017–18 | Coimbra FA Honour Division | 4 | 0 | 0 | 0 | – | | 0 | 0 | 4 | 0 |
| Cova da Piedade II | 2018–19 | Setúbal FA Honour Division | 8 | 1 | – | | – | | 0 | 0 | 8 | 1 |
| Heilongjiang Ice City | 2021 | China League One | 0 | 0 | 0 | 0 | – | | 0 | 0 | 0 | 0 |
| Career total | | | 15 | 1 | 1 | 0 | 1 | 0 | 0 | 0 | 17 | 1 |
