= Mustahan Mijit =

Chinese association football player

Personal information
- Date of birth: 20 August 1998 (age 28)
- Place of birth: Karamay, Xinjiang, China
- Height: 1.87 m (6 ft 2 in)
- Position: Defender

Team information
- Current team: Suzhou Dongwu
- Number: 45

Senior career*
| Years | Team | Apps | (Gls) |
| 2020–2021 | Xinjiang Tianshan Leopard | 20 | (0) |
| 2022–2023 | Jiangxi Lushan | 25 | (1) |
| 2024 | Xinjiang Silk Road Eagle | 4 | (1) |
| 2025 | Lanzhou Longyuan Athletic | 26 | (3) |
| 2026– | Suzhou Dongwu | 0 | (0) |
- * Club domestic league appearances and goals as of 23:02, 8 March 2026 (UTC)

Mustahan Mijit (Chinese: 木斯塔汉·米吉提; born 20 August 1998) is a Chinese footballer currently playing as a defender for China League One club Suzhou Dongwu.

== Career statistics ==
=== Club ===
As of 17 August 2021.

| Club | Season | League | | | Cup | | Other | | Total | |
| Club | Season | Division | Apps | Goals | Apps | Goals | Apps | Goals | Apps | Goals |
|---|---|---|---|---|---|---|---|---|---|---|
| Xinjiang Tianshan Leopard | 2020 | China League One | 9 | 0 | 0 | 0 | 2 (Note: Appearances in the China League One playoffs) | 0 | 11 | 0 |
| Xinjiang Tianshan Leopard | 2021 | China League One | 4 | 0 | 0 | 0 | 0 | 0 | 4 | 0 |
| Career total | | | 13 | 0 | 0 | 0 | 2 | 0 | 15 | 0 |
