= Zhu Jiayi =

Chinese association football player

Personal information
- Date of birth: 31 January 1999 (age 27)
- Place of birth: Funing County, Jiangsu, China
- Height: 1.89 m (6 ft 2 in)
- Position: Defender

Youth career
- –2020: Shanghai Port

Senior career*
Years	Team	Apps	(Gls)
2020–2021	Shanghai Port	0	(0)
2020	→ Inner Mongolia Zhongyou (loan)	10	(0)
2021	→ Nanjing City (loan)	0	(0)
2022	Chongqing Liangjiang Athletic	0	(0)
2022–2023	Nanjing City	16	(0)
2023	→ Hunan Billows (loan)	10	(0)
2024	Shenzhen Shengqing	2	(0)
Total		38	(0)
- * Club domestic league appearances and goals as of 14:01, 27 April 2022 (UTC)

Zhu Jiayi (Chinese: 朱佳毅; born 31 January 1999) is a Chinese former footballer.

On 10 September 2024, Chinese Football Association announced that Zhu was banned from football-related activities for lifetime for involving in match-fixing.

== Career statistics ==
=== Club ===
As of 4 June 2024.

Club	Season	League			Cup		Continental		Other		Total	
Club	Season	Division	Apps	Goals	Apps	Goals	Apps	Goals	Apps	Goals	Apps	Goals
Shanghai Port	2020	Chinese Super League	0	0	1 (Note: Appearances in the Chinese FA Cup)	0	0	0	–		1	0
Shanghai Port	2021	Chinese Super League	0	0	–		1 (Note: Appearances in AFC Champions League)	0	–		1	0
Shanghai Port	Total		0	0	1	0	1	0	0	0	2	0
Inner Mongolia Zhongyou (loan)	2020	China League One	7	0	0	0	–		3 (Note: Appearances in the China League One relegation playoffs)	0	10	0
Nanjing City (loan)	2021	China League One	0	0	1	0	–		–		1	0
Nanjing City	2022	China League One	16	0	2	0	–		–		18	0
Nanjing City	2023	China League One	0	0	2	0	–		–		2	0
Nanjing City	Total		16	0	4	0	1	0	0	0	20	0
Hunan Billows (loan)	2023	China League Two	10	0	–		–		–		10	0
Shenzhen Shengqing	2024	Chinese Champions League	2	0	–		–		–		2	0
Career total			35	0	6	0	1	0	3	0	45	0
