= Li Zhongting =

Chinese footballer (born 1995)

Personal information
- Date of birth: 12 May 1995 (age 31)
- Place of birth: Shenyang, Liaoning, China
- Height: 1.80 m (5 ft 11 in)
- Position: Midfielder

Youth career
- –2015: Changchun Yatai

Senior career*
Years	Team	Apps	(Gls)
2016	Loures	0	(0)
2016	→ Murteirense (loan)		
2016–2018	Tourizense	3	(0)
2018–2019	Cova da Piedade B	20	(3)
2020	Loures	0	(0)
2021	Liaoning Shenyang Urban	17	(2)
2022	Heilongjiang Ice City	25	(0)
2023	Dalian Huayi	0	(0)
2025	Shanxi Chongde Ronghai	10	(0)
- * Club domestic league appearances and goals as of 17:14, 25 April 2022 (UTC)

Li Zhongting (Chinese: 李重挺; born 12 May 1995) is a Chinese footballer who plays as a midfielder.

== Career statistics ==
=== Club ===
As of 26 December 2021.

Club	Season	League			Cup		Continental		Other		Total	
Club	Season	Division	Apps	Goals	Apps	Goals	Apps	Goals	Apps	Goals	Apps	Goals
Loures	2015–16	Campeonato de Portugal	0	0	0	0	–		0	0	0	0
Tourizense	2016–17	Campeonato de Portugal	3	0	0	0	–		0	0	3	0
Cova da Piedade B	2018–19	I AF Setúbal	20	3	–		–		0	0	20	3
Loures	2019–20	Campeonato de Portugal	0	0	0	0	–		0	0	0	0
Liaoning Shenyang Urban	2021	China League One	17	2	1 (Note: Appearances in the Chinese FA Cup)	0	–		0	0	18	2
Career total			40	5	1	0	0	0	0	0	41	5
