= Fan Weixiang =

Chinese association football player

Personal information
- Date of birth: 26 June 1997 (age 29)
- Height: 1.91 m (6 ft 3 in)
- Position: Goalkeeper

Team information
- Current team: Jiangxi Beidamen

Youth career
- –2015: Shenyang Dongjin

Senior career*
Years	Team	Apps	(Gls)
2015	Shenyang Dongjin	3	(0)
2018–2021	Chongqing Liangjiang Athletic	1	(0)
2022-	Jiangxi Beidamen	0	(0)
- * Club domestic league appearances and goals as of 19:01, 25 April 2022 (UTC)

Fan Weixiang (Chinese: 范伟翔; born 26 June 1997) is a Chinese footballer currently playing as a goalkeeper for Jiangxi Beidamen.

== Career statistics ==
=== Club ===
As of 25 December 2021.

Club	Season	League			Cup		Other		Total	
Club	Season	Division	Apps	Goals	Apps	Goals	Apps	Goals	Apps	Goals
Shenyang Dongjin	2015	China League Two	3	0	0	0	0	0	3	0
Chongqing Liangjiang Athletic	2018	Chinese Super League	0	0	0	0	0	0	0	0
Chongqing Liangjiang Athletic	2019	Chinese Super League	0	0	0	0	0	0	0	0
Chongqing Liangjiang Athletic	2020	Chinese Super League	0	0	0	0	0	0	0	0
Chongqing Liangjiang Athletic	2021	Chinese Super League	1	0	0	0	0	0	1	0
Chongqing Liangjiang Athletic	Total		1	0	0	0	0	0	1	0
Career total			4	0	0	0	0	0	4	0
