= Su Shihao =

Chinese footballer (b. 1999)

Su Shihao 苏士豪
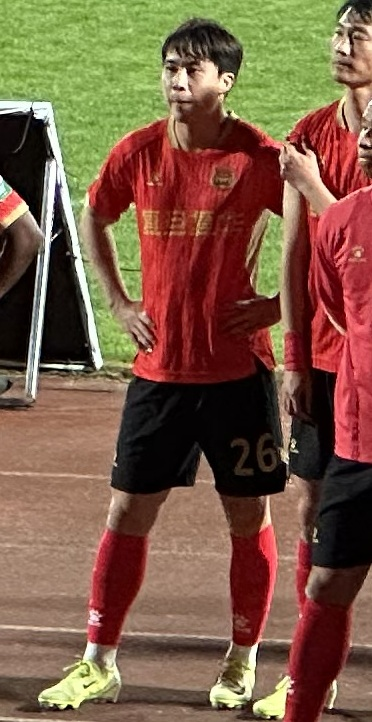
- Su Shihao in May 2025

Personal information
- Full name: Su Shihao
- Date of birth: 29 December 1999 (age 26)
- Place of birth: Shijiazhuang, Hebei, China
- Height: 1.78 m (5 ft 10 in)
- Position: Left-back

Team information
- Current team: Ningbo FC
- Number: 26

Senior career*
Years	Team	Apps	(Gls)
2018–2022	Shanghai Shenhua	0	(0)
2020	→ Inner Mongolia Zhongyou (loan)	8	(0)
2021	→ Meizhou Hakka (loan)	21	(0)
2022	→ Qingdao Youth Island (loan)	10	(0)
2023	Dongguan United	17	(0)
2024–	Ningbo FC	22	(0)

International career^{‡}
2022	China	2	(0)
Medal record
Representing China
Men's football
EAFF Championship
Bronze medal – third place	2022 Japan	Team
- * Club domestic league appearances and goals as of 18 January 2025 ‡ National team caps and goals as of 24 July 2022

Su Shihao (Chinese: 苏士豪; born 29 December 1999) is a Chinese professional footballer who currently plays for China League One club Ningbo FC.

== Club career ==
Su joined Shanghai Shenhua's youth academy in March 2018 after the club bought Genbao Football Base's under-19 team. He was loaned to China League One clubs Inner Mongolia Zhongyou and Meizhou Hakka for the 2020 and 2021 season respectively, achieved promotion to the Chinese Super League with the latter. In 2022, he was loaned to newly-promoted China League One club Qingdao Youth Island.

== International career ==
In 2018, Su was transferred from the U19 team to the U20 team to prepare for the Asian Youth Championship, so could not take part in the Youth Super League. In 2023, Su was listed as part of the Chinese U-23 national team by the Chinese Football Association (CFA). On 20 July 2022, Su made his international debut in a 3-0 defeat against South Korea in the 2022 EAFF E-1 Football Championship, as the CFA decided to field the U-23 national team for this senior competition.

== Career statistics ==
As of 19 October 2024.

Appearances and goals by club, season and competition
Club	Season	League			National Cup		Continental		Other		Total	
Club	Season	Division	Apps	Goals	Apps	Goals	Apps	Goals	Apps	Goals	Apps	Goals
Inner Mongolia Zhongyou (Loan)	2020	China League One	8	0	0	0	-		-		8	0
Meizhou Hakka (loan)	2021	China League One	21	0	1	0	-		-		22	0
Qingdao Youth Island (loan)	2022	China League One	10	0	1	0	-		-		11	0
Dongguan United	2023	China League One	17	0	1	0	-		-		18	0
Shanghai Jiading Huilong	2024	China League One	22	0	0	0	-		-		22	0
Career total			78	0	3	0	0	0	0	0	81	0
