= Zheng Xuejian =

Chinese association football player

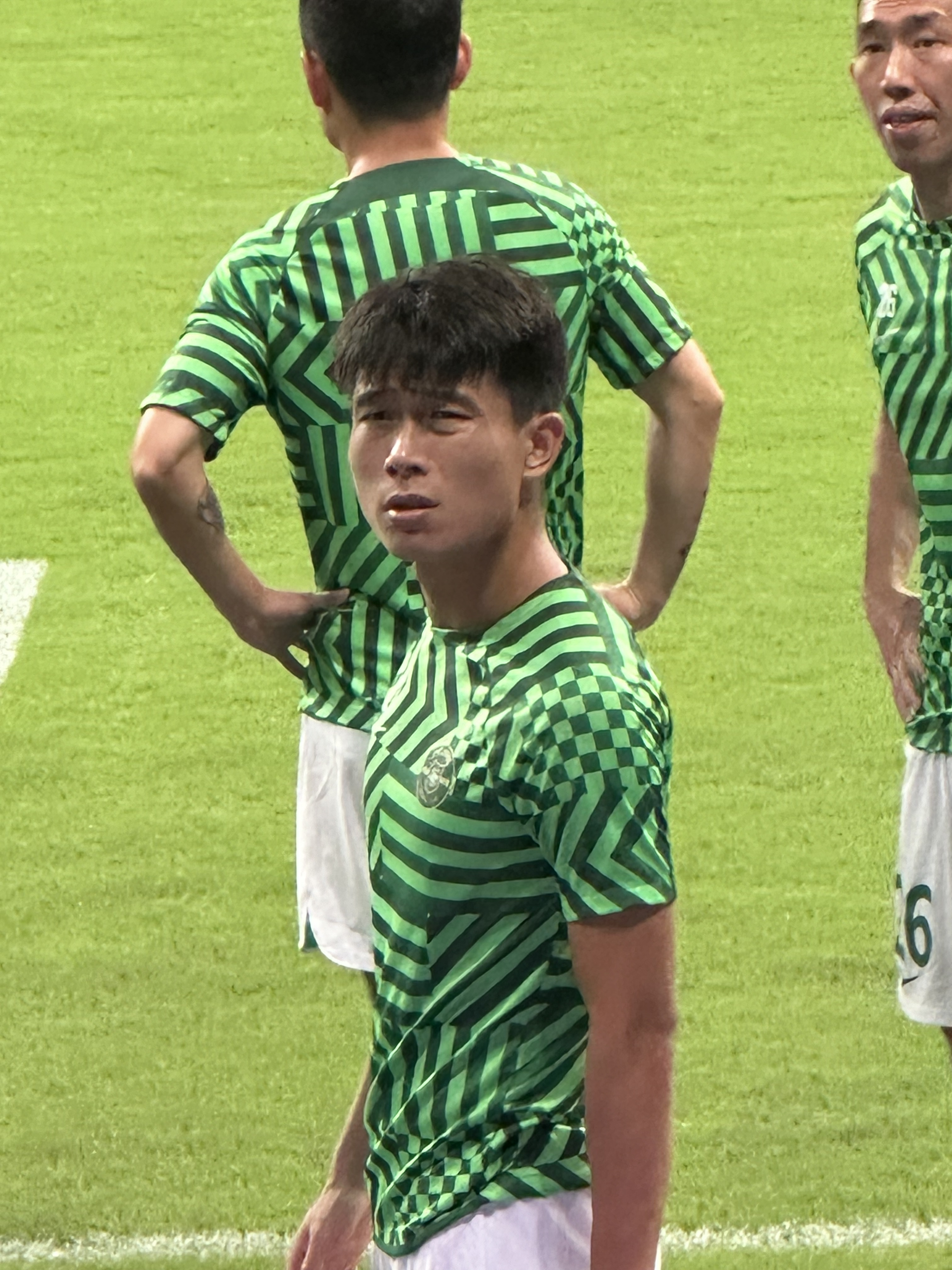
- Zheng Xuejian in August 2024

Personal information
- Date of birth: 23 February 2001 (age 25)
- Place of birth: Xuzhou, Jiangsu, China
- Height: 1.83 m (6 ft 0 in)
- Position: Midfielder

Team information
- Current team: Nanjing City
- Number: 27

Youth career
- –2020: Jiangsu Suning

Senior career*
Years	Team	Apps	(Gls)
2020	Jiangsu Suning	0	(0)
2020	→ China U19 (loan)	5	(0)
2021	Nanjing City	27	(0)
2021	→ China U20 (loan)	3	(0)
2022–2024	Zhejiang FC	0	(0)
2023	→ Jiangxi Lushan (loan)	16	(1)
2025–	Nanjing City	19	(0)

International career^{‡}
2016–2018	China U17		
2023	China U21		
- * Club domestic league appearances and goals as of 9 March 2026 ‡ National team caps and goals as of 00:01, 29 April 2022 (UTC)

Zheng Xuejian (Chinese: 郑雪健; born 23 February 2001) is a Chinese footballer currently playing as a midfielder at Nanjing City.

== Club career ==
Zheng Xuejian would play for the Jiangsu Suning youth team before being selected for the Chinese U17 team. He would go on to be promoted to the Jiangsu senior in the 2020 league season before being loaned out to the Chinese U19 team, who were allowed to participate within the third tier of the Chinese football league pyramid. After his loan period ended and he would return to Jiangsu he would discover that on 28 February 2021, the parent company of the club Suning Holdings Group announced that operations were going to cease immediately due to financial difficulties.

Zhang would be free to join second tier club Nanjing City in the 2021 league season and would go on to make his debut in a league game on 30 April 2021 against Chengdu Rongcheng in a 2-0 defeat. He would go on to establish himself as vital member of their team throughout the season and would even go out on loan to the Chinese U20 team who participated within the Chinese third tier. On 17 February 2022 he would transfer to top tier club Zhejiang. He would go on to make his debut in a Chinese FA Cup game on 18 November 2022 against Dalian Professional in a 1-0 victory.

== Career statistics ==
As of match played 31 December 2025.

Appearances and goals by club, season and competition
Club	Season	League			Cup		Continental		Other		Total	
Club	Season	Division	Apps	Goals	Apps	Goals	Apps	Goals	Apps	Goals	Apps	Goals
Jiangsu Suning	2020	Chinese Super League	0	0	0	0	-		-		0	0
China U19 (loan)	2020	China League Two	5	0	0	0	-		-		5	0
Nanjing City	2021	China League One	27	0	1	0	-		-		28	0
China U20 (loan)	2021	China League Two	3	0	1	0	-		-		4	0
Zhejiang FC	2022	Chinese Super League	0	0	2	0	-		-		2	0
Zhejiang FC	2023	Chinese Super League	0	0	0	0	-		-		0	0
Zhejiang FC	2024	Chinese Super League	0	0	0	0	-		-		0	0
Zhejiang FC	Total		0	0	2	0	0	0	0	0	2	0
Jiangxi Lushan (loan)	2023	China League One	16	1	-		-		-		16	1
Nanjing City	2025	China League One	19	0	1	0	-		-		20	0
Career total			70	1	5	0	0	0	0	0	75	1

== External sources ==
- Zheng Xuejian at WorldFootball.net
