= Keweser Xamixidin =

Chinese association football player (born 1999)

Personal information
- Date of birth: 18 March 1999 (age 27)
- Place of birth: Bole, Xinjiang, China
- Height: 1.71 m (5 ft 7 in)
- Position: Forward

Team information
- Current team: Xinjiang Tianshan Leopard

Youth career
- –2018: Xinjiang Soong Ching-ling

Senior career*
Years	Team	Apps	(Gls)
2018–2020	Gondomar B		
2020–2022	Gondomar	3	(0)
2021	→ Wuhan (loan)	0	(0)
2022–2023	Xinjiang Tianshan Leopard	5	(1)

International career
2016	China U17		
- * Club domestic league appearances and goals as of 14:01, 16 August 2022 (UTC)

Keweser Xamixidin (Chinese: 凯维赛尔·夏米西丁; born 18 March 1999) is a Chinese footballer who played most recently as a forward for Xinjiang Tianshan Leopard.

== Club career ==
Born in Bole, Xinjiang, Keweser moved to Portugal in 2018 to join the 'B' team of Gondomar.

== Career statistics ==
=== Club ===
As of 16 August 2022.

Club	Season	League			Cup		Other		Total	
Club	Season	Division	Apps	Goals	Apps	Goals	Apps	Goals	Apps	Goals
Gondomar	2020–21	Campeonato de Portugal	3	0	0	0	0	0	3	0
Gondomar	2021–22	Campeonato de Portugal	0	0	0	0	0	0	0	0
Gondomar	Total		3	0	0	0	0	0	3	0
Wuhan (loan)	2021	Chinese Super League	0	0	2 (Note: Appearances in the Chinese FA Cup)	0	0	0	2	0
Xinjiang Tianshan Leopard	2022	China League One	5	1	0	0	0	0	5	1
Career total			8	1	2	0	0	0	10	1
