= Shi Yan (footballer) =

Chinese association football player

Marco
Personal information
- Date of birth: 30 May 2002 (age 24)
- Place of birth: Changsha, Hunan, China
- Height: 1.70 m (5 ft 7 in)
- Positions: Forward; midfielder

Team information
- Current team: Tianjin Jinmen Tiger
- Number: 40

Youth career
- 2011–2020: Shandong Taishan

Senior career*
Years	Team	Apps	(Gls)
2020	Shandong Taishan	0	(0)
2020	→ Inner Mongolia Caoshangfei (loan)	0	(0)
2021	→ Tianjin Jinmen Tiger (loan)	13	(2)
2022–	Tianjin Jinmen Tiger	82	(3)

International career
2023	China U23		
- * Club domestic league appearances and goals as of 22 November 2026

Shi Yan (Chinese: 石炎; born 30 May 2002) is a Chinese footballer currently playing as a forward or midfielder for Tianjin Jinmen Tiger.

== Club career ==
Shi Yan would play for the Shandong Taishan youth team before being promoted to the senior team and was loaned out to third tier football club Inner Mongolia Caoshangfei to gain senior experience. On his return he would be loaned out once again, this time to top tier club Tianjin Jinmen Tiger where he made his debut for them in a league game on 22 July 2022 against Shanghai Shenhua in a 3-1 defeat. This would be followed by his first goal for the club on 28 July 2021 in a league game against Changchun Yatai in a 4-1 defeat. On 28 April 2022 he would officially join Tianjin on a permanent basis for the start of the next season.

== Career statistics ==
As of 31 December 2022.

Club	Season	League			Cup		Continental		Other		Total	
Club	Season	Division	Apps	Goals	Apps	Goals	Apps	Goals	Apps	Goals	Apps	Goals
Shandong Taishan	2020	Chinese Super League	0	0	0	0	0	0	0	0	0	0
Shandong Taishan	2021	Chinese Super League	0	0	0	0	0	0	0	0	0	0
Shandong Taishan	Total		0	0	0	0	0	0	0	0	0	0
Inner Mongolia Caoshangfei (loan)	2020	China League Two	0	0	0	0	–		0	0	0	0
Tianjin Jinmen Tiger (loan)	2021	Chinese Super League	13	2	1	0	–		0	0	14	2
Tianjin Jinmen Tiger	2022	Chinese Super League	26	2	0	0	–		0	0	26	2
Career total			39	4	1	0	0	0	0	0	40	4
