= Wu Xingyu =

Chinese association football player

Personal information
- Date of birth: 27 March 2000 (age 26)
- Place of birth: Xuancheng, Anhui, China
- Height: 1.70 m (5 ft 7 in)
- Position: Left winger

Team information
- Current team: Nantong Zhiyun (on loan from Qingdao Hainiu)
- Number: 27

Youth career
- –2019: Shandong Luneng

Senior career*
Years	Team	Apps	(Gls)
2019–2022	Shandong Luneng	0	(0)
2019	→ Desportivo Brasil (loan)	0	(0)
2021	→ Qingdao Hainiu (loan)	23	(7)
2022–2023	Shenzhen FC	7	(0)
2023	Tai'an Tiankuang	12	(7)
2024–2025	Guangdong GZ-Power	37	(1)
2026–	Qingdao Hainiu	0	(0)
2026–	→ Nantong Zhiyun (loan)	0	(0)
- * Club domestic league appearances and goals as of 10:01, 31 December 2022 (UTC)

Wu Xingyu (Chinese: 吴星宇; born 27 March 2000) is a Chinese footballer who plays as a left winger for Nantong Zhiyun, on loan from Qingdao Hainiu.

== Club career ==
Wu Xingyu would play for the Shandong Luneng youth team and moved into the senior team before he was loaned to Desportivo Brasil. After being set back with a meniscus injury, Wu was sent to Qingdao Hainiu for the 2021 China League Two season. At Qingdao he would go on to establish himself as regular within the team and was part of the squad that won the 2021 China League Two division title.

On 8 May 2022, Wu would transfer to top tier club Shenzhen FC before the start of the 2022 Chinese Super League season. He would make his debut for the club on 11 July 2022 in a league game against Beijing Guoan in a 2-1 victory.

On 29 June 2026, Wu was loaned out to China League One club Nantong Zhiyun.

== Career statistics ==
As of 31 December 2022.

Club	Season	League			Cup		Continental		Other		Total	
Club	Season	Division	Apps	Goals	Apps	Goals	Apps	Goals	Apps	Goals	Apps	Goals
Shandong Luneng	2019	Chinese Super League	0	0	0	0	0	0	–		0	0
Shandong Luneng	2020	Chinese Super League	0	0	0	0	–		–		0	0
Shandong Luneng	2021	Chinese Super League	0	0	0	0	–		–		0	0
Shandong Luneng	Total		0	0	0	0	0	0	0	0	0	0
Desportivo Brasil (loan)	2019	–			0	0	–		0 (Note: Appearances in Paulistão A3)	0	0	0
Qingdao Hainiu (loan)	2021	China League Two	23	7	1	0	–		–		24	7
Shenzhen FC	2022	Chinese Super League	7	0	1	0	–		–		8	0
Career total			30	7	2	0	0	0	0	0	32	7

== Honours ==
=== Club ===
Qingdao Hainiu

- China League Two: 2021
