= Li Yuefeng =

Chinese lawyer and politician

- 李钺锋

Executive Vice Chairperson of the Taiwan Democratic Self-Government League
- In office December 2017 – March 2024
- Chairperson: Su Hui

Vice Chairman of the Chongqing Municipal Committee of the Chinese People's Political Consultative Conference
- In office January 2013 – January 2018
- Chairman: Xu Jingye

Personal details
- Born: July 1958 (age 68) Yuzhong District, Chongqing, China
- Party: Taiwan Democratic Self-Government League (2001–2024; expelled)
- Education: Chongqing University

Chinese name
- Simplified Chinese: 李钺锋
- Traditional Chinese: 李鉞鋒
Transcriptions
Standard Mandarin
- Hanyu Pinyin: Lǐ Yuèfēng

Li Yuefeng (Chinese: 李钺锋; born July 1958) is a former Chinese lawyer and politician who spent his entire career in southwest China's Chongqing. He was investigated by China's top anti-graft agency in March 2024. Previously he served as executive vice chairperson of the Taiwan Democratic Self-Government League and before that, vice chairman of the Chongqing Municipal Committee of the Chinese People's Political Consultative Conference.

He was a member of the 11th and 12th National Committee of the Chinese People's Political Consultative Conference. He was a delegate to the 13th and 14th National People's Congress. He was a member of the Standing Committee of the 13th National People's Congress.

== Career ==
Li was born in Yuzhong District, Chongqing, in July 1958, while his ancestral home in Zhongli District of Taoyuan, Taiwan.

After the Cultural Revolution in 1976, he was a worker at the Dayanggou Industrial Company and then the Long March Hardware and Electrical Appliance Factory in December 1979. While working in the factory, he also studied at the Chongqing Enterprise Legal Advisor Training Course of Southwest University of Political Science and Law for six months. In December 1986, he became a lawyer at Chongqing First Law Firm, and served until September 1997, when he was recruited as director of Chongqing Yonghe Law Firm. He joined the Taiwan Democratic Self-Government League in November 2001. He served as deputy prosecutor general of the First Branch of Chongqing People's Procuratorate from November 2004 to November 2012, and deputy prosecutor general of Chongqing People's Procuratorate, from November 2012 to September 2018. He concurrently served as vice chairman of the Chongqing Municipal Committee of the Chinese People's Political Consultative Conference, the municipal advisory body, between January 2013 and January 2018. In November 2017, he was proposed as executive vice chairperson of the Taiwan Democratic Self-Government League, one of the eight minor political parties in China led by the Chinese Communist Party.

== Downfall ==
On 23 March 2024, he was put under investigation for alleged "serious duty-related malfeasance" by the Central Commission for Discipline Inspection (CCDI), the party's internal disciplinary body, and the National Supervisory Commission, the highest anti-corruption agency of China. On May 29, his qualification for delegates to the 14th National People's Congress was terminated. He was removed from public office on October 11 and was expelled from the Taiwan Democratic Self-Government League on October 14. On December 4, he was detained by the Supreme People's Procuratorate.

On 18 March 2025, he was indicted on suspicion of accepting bribes. On July 3, he stood trial at the Intermediate People's Court of Taiyuan on charges of taking bribes, the public prosecutors accused him of abusing his multiple positions between 2011 and 2024 in Chongqing and Beijing to seek favor on behalf of certain organizations and individuals in judicial case handling, engineering payment collection, and enterprise operation; in return, he accepted money and gifts worth more than 93.42 million yuan ($13 million) personally or through his family members. The court sentenced Li to life imprisonment for bribery, all property gained from the bribery would be turned over to the national treasury, and he was deprived of his political rights for life, and all his personal assets were confiscated.
