= Wang Zhuo (footballer) =

Chinese association football player

Personal information
- Date of birth: 16 January 1990 (age 36)
- Place of birth: Shenyang, Liaoning, China
- Height: 1.87 m (6 ft 2 in)
- Position: Goalkeeper

Senior career*
Years	Team	Apps	(Gls)
2010	Liaoning Tiger	0	(0)
2011	Fushun Xinye	1	(0)
2012–2021	Guizhou Hengfeng	80	(0)
2022	Zibo Cuju	7	(0)
2024–2025	Dalian K'un City	32	(1)
- * Club domestic league appearances and goals as of 14:01, 5 April 2024 (UTC)

Wang Zhuo (Chinese: 王卓; pinyin: Wáng Zhuō; born 16 January 1990) is a Chinese footballer.

== Club career ==
Wang Zhuo would play for lower league clubs Liaoning Tiger and Fushun Xinye before joining Guizhou Hengfeng where he was part of the team that won the 2012 China League Two division. The following season he was promoted as the clubs first choice goalkeeper, however the club performed poorly within the 2013 China League One campaigned where they were relegated at the end of the season and Wang was singled out for criticism by the fans on social media for his weight, which stood at 108 kilograms. Su Boyang would be brought in as Guizhou's first choice goalkeeper the next season while Wang significantly lost weight and aided the club to gain successive promotions to the Chinese top tier. On 17 June 2017, Wang would make his Chinese Super League debut against Guangzhou Evergrande that ended in a 2–0 defeat.

== Career statistics ==
As of 5 April 2024.

Appearances and goals by club, season and competition
Club	Season	League			National Cup		Continental		Other		Total	
Club	Season	Division	Apps	Goals	Apps	Goals	Apps	Goals	Apps	Goals	Apps	Goals
Liaoning Tiger	2010	China League Two	0	0	-		-		-		0	0
Fushun Xinye	2011	China League Two	1	0	-		-		-		1	0
Guizhou Zhicheng	2012	China League Two	6	0	0	0	-		-		6	0
Guizhou Zhicheng	2013	China League One	26	0	0	0	-		-		26	0
Guizhou Zhicheng	2014	China League Two	2	0	0	0	-		-		2	0
Guizhou Zhicheng	2015	China League One	16	0	1	0	-		-		17	0
Guizhou Zhicheng	2016	China League One	4	0	0	0	-		-		4	0
Guizhou Zhicheng	2017	Chinese Super League	4	0	1	0	-		-		5	0
Guizhou Zhicheng	2018	Chinese Super League	0	0	0	0	-		-		0	0
Guizhou Zhicheng	2019	China League One	0	0	0	0	-		-		0	0
Guizhou Zhicheng	2020	China League One	2	0	1	0	-		-		3	0
Guizhou Zhicheng	2021	China League One	20	0	0	0	-		-		20	0
Guizhou Zhicheng	Total		80	0	3	0	0	0	0	0	83	0
Zibo Cuju	2022	China League One	7	0	0	0	-		-		7	0
Dalian K'un City	2024	China League Two	3	0	0	0	-		-		3	0
Career total			91	0	3	0	0	0	0	0	94	0

== Honours ==
=== Club ===
Guizhou Hengfeng

- China League Two: 2012
