= Ahmat Tursunjan =

Chinese association football player

Personal information
- Date of birth: 9 July 2000 (age 26)
- Place of birth: Ürümqi, Xinjiang, China
- Height: 1.83 m (6 ft 0 in)
- Position: Midfielder

Team information
- Current team: Wuxi Wugo
- Number: 6

Senior career*
Years	Team	Apps	(Gls)
2019–2023	Hubei Istar	40	(5)
2021	→ Henan Songshan Longmen (loan)	1	(0)
2022	→ Xinjiang Tianshan Leopard (loan)	30	(2)
2023	→ Heilongjiang Ice City (loan)	22	(1)
2024–	Wuxi Wugo	54	(3)
- * Club domestic league appearances and goals as of 14:01, 29 April 2022 (UTC)

Ahmat Tursunjan (Chinese: 艾合买提·吐尔逊江; born 9 July 2000) is a Chinese footballer currently playing as a midfielder for Wuxi Wugo.

== Career statistics ==
=== Club ===
As of 10 May 2021.

Club	Season	League			Cup		Continental		Other		Total	
Club	Season	Division	Apps	Goals	Apps	Goals	Apps	Goals	Apps	Goals	Apps	Goals
Hubei Istar	2019	China League Two	28	3	1 (Note: Appearances in the Chinese FA Cup)	0	–		2 (Note: Appearances in the China League Two playoffs)	0	31	2
Hubei Istar	2020	China League Two	10	2	0	0	–		0	0	10	2
Hubei Istar	2021	China League Two	0	0	0	0	–		0	0	0	0
Hubei Istar	Total		38	5	1	0	0	0	2	0	41	2
Henan Songshan Longmen (loan)	2021	Chinese Super League	1	0	0	0	–		0	0	1	0
Career total			39	5	1	0	0	0	2	0	42	2
