= Fan Jinming =

Chinese association football player

Personal information
- Date of birth: 20 January 1997 (age 29)
- Place of birth: Jilin, China
- Height: 1.88 m (6 ft 2 in)
- Position: Goalkeeper

Youth career
- –2015: Hangzhou Greentown

Senior career*
Years	Team	Apps	(Gls)
2015–2024	Zhejiang FC	24	(0)
2015	→ Yunnan Flying Tigers (loan)	0	(0)
2021	→ Sichuan Jiuniu (loan)	0	(0)
2022	→ Xinjiang Tianshan Leopard (loan)	11	(0)
2022	→ Jinan Xingzhou (loan)	0	(0)
2025	Dalian K'un City	24	(0)

International career^{‡}
2018	China U-20	4	(0)
2018	China U-21	1	(0)
- * Club domestic league appearances and goals as of 00:01, 31 January 2023 (UTC) ‡ National team caps and goals as of 00:01, 15 December 2022 (UTC)

Fan Jinming (Chinese: 樊津铭; born 20 January 1997) is a Chinese footballer currently playing as a goalkeeper.

== Club career ==
Fan Jinming would be promoted to the senior team of Zhejiang FC before being loaned out to Yunnan Flying Tigers for the 2015 China League Two campaign. He would return to his parent club where he would eventually go on to make his debut in a league game on 22 April 2017 against Baoding Yingli ETS in a 2-1 defeat. After the game he would start to establish himself as the clubs second choice goalkeeper and was given a contract extension. With the introduction of Chinese international goalkeeper Gu Chao joining the team, Fan was loaned out to Sichuan Jiuniu on 26 July 2021. This would be followed by another loan period to Xinjiang Tianshan Leopard on 7 May 2022 and then Jinan Xingzhou on 30 August 2022.

On 3 January 2025, Fan joined the China League One club Dalian K'un City.

== Career statistics ==
As of 31 January 2023.

Club	Season	League			Cup		Continental		Other		Total	
Club	Season	Division	Apps	Goals	Apps	Goals	Apps	Goals	Apps	Goals	Apps	Goals
Zhejiang FC	2015	Chinese Super League	0	0	0	0	–		–		0	0
Zhejiang FC	2016	Chinese Super League	0	0	0	0	–		–		0	0
Zhejiang FC	2017	China League One	5	0	0	0	–		–		5	0
Zhejiang FC	2018	China League One	1	0	1	0	–		–		2	0
Zhejiang FC	2019	China League One	2	0	1	0	–		–		3	0
Zhejiang FC	2020	China League One	16	0	0	0	–		2 (Note: Appearances in Promotion/Relegation Play-offs)	0	18	0
Zhejiang FC	Total		24	0	2	0	0	0	0	0	26	0
Yunnan Flying Tigers (loan)	2015	China League Two	0	0	0	0	–		–		0	0
Sichuan Jiuniu (loan)	2021	China League One	0	0	0	0	–		–		0	0
Xinjiang Tianshan Leopard (loan)	2022	China League One	11	0	0	0	–		–		11	0
Jinan Xingzhou (loan)	2022	China League Two	0	0	0	0	–		–		0	0
Career total			35	0	2	0	0	0	2	0	39	0
