= Song Runtong =

Chinese footballer

Personal information
- Date of birth: 18 September 2001 (age 25)
- Place of birth: Qingdao, Shandong, China
- Height: 1.85 m (6 ft 1 in)
- Position: Forward

Youth career
- –2020: Shanghai Shenhua

Senior career*
| Years | Team | Apps | (Gls) |
| 2020–2023 | Shanghai Shenhua | 0 | (0) |
| 2020 | → China U19 (loan) | 4 | (0) |
| 2021 | → Qingdao FC (loan) | 5 | (0) |
| 2022 | → Qingdao Youth Island (loan) | 0 | (0) |
| 2022 | → Heilongjiang Ice City (loan) | 7 | (1) |
| 2023–2025 | Henan FC | 4 | (0) |
| 2024 | → Foshan Nanshi (loan) | 22 | (3) |
| 2025 | → Qingdao Red Lions (loan) | 16 | (0) |

International career
- China U20
- * Club domestic league appearances and goals as of 25 July 2023

Song Runtong (Chinese: 宋润潼; born 18 September 2001) is a Chinese footballer who plays as a forward.

== Career statistics ==
| Club | Season | League | | | Cup | | Continental | | Other | | Total | |
| Club | Season | Division | Apps | Goals | Apps | Goals | Apps | Goals | Apps | Goals | Apps | Goals |
|---|---|---|---|---|---|---|---|---|---|---|---|---|
| Shanghai Shenhua | 2020 | Chinese Super League | 0 | 0 | 0 | 0 | – | | – | | 0 | 0 |
| China U19 (loan) | 2020 | China League Two | 4 | 0 | 0 | 0 | – | | 0 | 0 | 4 | 0 |
| Qingdao FC (loan) | 2021 | Chinese Super League | 5 | 0 | 2 | 0 | – | | 0 | 0 | 7 | 0 |
| Qingdao Youth Island (loan) | 2022 | China League One | 0 | 0 | 0 | 0 | – | | – | | 0 | 0 |
| Heilongjiang Ice City (loan) | 2022 | China League One | 7 | 1 | – | | – | | – | | 7 | 1 |
| Henan FC | 2023 | Chinese Super League | 4 | 0 | 2 | 1 | – | | – | | 6 | 1 |
| Career total | | | 20 | 1 | 4 | 1 | 0 | 0 | 0 | 0 | 24 | 2 |
