= Zhou Zheng =

Chinese association football player

Personal information
- Date of birth: 25 September 1997 (age 29)
- Height: 1.81 m (5 ft 11 in)
- Position: Midfielder

Team information
- Current team: Shanghai Tongji

Youth career
- –2020: Shanghai Port

Senior career*
Years	Team	Apps	(Gls)
2020–2022	Shanghai Port	0	(0)
2020	→ Inner Mongolia Zhongyou (loan)	15	(0)
2022	Tianjin Jinmen Tiger	1	(0)
2023-	Shanghai Tongji	0	(0)

International career
- China U20
- * Club domestic league appearances and goals as of 12:01, 31 January 2023 (UTC)

Zhou Zheng (Chinese: 周正; born 25 September 1997) is a Chinese footballer currently playing as a midfielder for Shanghai Tongji.

== Club career ==
Zhou Zheng would be promoted to the senior team of Shanghai Port within the 2020 Chinese Super League season and would make his debut in a Chinese FA Cup game on 26 November 2020 against Changchun Yatai F.C. in a 4–0 defeat. The following season he would be loaned out to second-tier club Inner Mongolia Zhongyou on 6 September 2021. On his return to his parent club he would make another appearance in a 2021 AFC Champions League qualification game on 23 June 2021 against Kaya F.C.–Iloilo that ended in a 1-0 defeat.

On 19 April 2022, Zhou transferred for free to fellow top-tier club Tianjin Jinmen Tiger for the start of the 2022 Chinese Super League campaign. He made his debut in a league game on 7 November 2022 against Hebei in a 5-0 victory. He would be unable to establish himself within the team and would join Shanghai Tongji on 29 March 2023.

== Career statistics ==
As of 31 January 2023.

Club	Season	League			Cup		Continental		Other		Total	
Club	Season	Division	Apps	Goals	Apps	Goals	Apps	Goals	Apps	Goals	Apps	Goals
Shanghai Port	2020	Chinese Super League	0	0	1	0	0	0	–		1	0
Shanghai Port	2021	Chinese Super League	0	0	0	0	1 (Note: Appearances in AFC Champions League qualification)	0	–		1	0
Shanghai Port	Total		0	0	1	0	1	0	0	0	2	0
Inner Mongolia Zhongyou (loan)	2020	China League One	15	0	0	0	–		–		15	0
Tianjin Jinmen Tiger	2022	Chinese Super League	1	0	1	0	–		–		2	0
Career total			16	0	2	0	1	0	0	0	19	0
