= Zhao Mingyu =

Chinese footballer

Personal information
- Date of birth: 29 January 1997 (age 29)
- Place of birth: Wuhan, Hubei, China
- Position: Midfielder

Team information
- Current team: Nanjing City

Youth career
- 2010–2017: Changchun Yatai

Senior career*
Years	Team	Apps	(Gls)
2017–2021	Changchun Yatai	32	(0)
2021	→ Nanjing City (loan)	10	(0)
2022-	Nanjing City	0	(0)
- * Club domestic league appearances and goals as of 16:54, 28 April 2022 (UTC)

Zhao Mingyu (simplified Chinese: 赵鸣宇; traditional Chinese: 趙鳴宇; pinyin: Zhào Míngyǔ; born 29 January 1997) is a Chinese footballer currently playing as a midfielder in China League One for Nanjing City.

== Club career ==
Born in Wuhan, Hubei, Zhao Mingyu joined the Changchun Yatai youth academy at the age of 13 in 2010. Working his way through the various age groups, he made his professional debut with the club in a 3-1 Chinese Super League victory over Jiangsu Suning during the 2017 season.

== Career statistics ==
As of 31 December 2020.

Club	Season	League			Cup		Continental		Other		Total	
Club	Season	Division	Apps	Goals	Apps	Goals	Apps	Goals	Apps	Goals	Apps	Goals
Changchun Yatai	2017	Chinese Super League	2	0	0	0	–		–		2	0
Changchun Yatai	2018	Chinese Super League	10	0	1	0	–		–		11	0
Changchun Yatai	2019	China League One	16	0	3	0	–		–		19	0
Changchun Yatai	2020	China League One	4	0	2	0	–		–		6	0
Changchun Yatai	Total		32	0	6	0	0	0	0	0	38	1
Career total			32	0	6	0	0	0	0	0	38	1

== Honours ==
=== Club ===
Changchun Yatai

- China League One: 2020
