= Mai Gaoling =

Chinese association football player

Personal information
- Date of birth: 12 September 1998 (age 28)
- Height: 1.87 m (6 ft 2 in)
- Position: Goalkeeper

Team information
- Current team: Shenzhen Juniors
- Number: 1

Senior career*
| Years | Team | Apps | (Gls) |
| 2020–2022 | Guangzhou FC | 0 | (0) |
| 2020 | → Inner Mongolia Zhongyou (loan) | 0 | (0) |
| 2021 | → Beijing BSU (loan) | 3 | (0) |
| 2022–2025 | Meizhou Hakka | 0 | (0) |
| 2024 | → Ganzhou Ruishi (loan) | 11 | (0) |
| 2026– | Shenzhen Juniors | 0 | (0) |
- * Club domestic league appearances and goals as of 7 January 2023

Mai Gaoling (Chinese: 麦高崚; born 12 September 1998) is a Chinese footballer currently playing as a goalkeeper for Shenzhen Juniors.

== Club career ==
Mai Gaoling would play for the Guangzhou FC team before being loaned out to second tier club Inner Mongolia Zhongyou on 15 August 2020. The following season he would go on to be loaned out again, this time to another second tier club in Beijing BSU where he made his debut in a league game on 30 April 2021 against Jiangxi Beidamen in a 1-0 defeat, where he came on as a substitute. The next season he would transfer to newly promoted top tier club Meizhou Hakka where he made his debut in a 2022 Chinese FA Cup game on 19 December 2022 against Chengdu Rongcheng in a 3-0 defeat.

== Career statistics ==
As of 7 January 2023.

| Club | Season | League | | | Cup | | Continental | | Other | | Total | |
| Club | Season | Division | Apps | Goals | Apps | Goals | Apps | Goals | Apps | Goals | Apps | Goals |
|---|---|---|---|---|---|---|---|---|---|---|---|---|
| Guangzhou FC | 2020 | Chinese Super League | 0 | 0 | 0 | 0 | 0 | 0 | – | | 0 | 0 |
| Guangzhou FC | 2021 | Chinese Super League | 0 | 0 | 0 | 0 | 0 | 0 | – | | 0 | 0 |
| Guangzhou FC | Total | | 0 | 0 | 0 | 0 | 0 | 0 | 0 | 0 | 0 | 0 |
| Inner Mongolia Zhongyou (loan) | 2020 | China League One | 0 | 0 | 0 | 0 | – | | – | | 0 | 0 |
| Beijing BSU (loan) | 2021 | China League One | 3 | 0 | 1 | 0 | – | | – | | 4 | 0 |
| Meizhou Hakka | 2022 | Chinese Super League | 0 | 0 | 1 | 0 | – | | – | | 1 | 0 |
| Career total | | | 3 | 0 | 2 | 0 | 0 | 0 | 0 | 0 | 5 | 0 |
