= Liu Zipeng =

Chinese association football player

Personal information
- Date of birth: 4 June 2000 (age 26)
- Place of birth: Shangrao, Jiangxi, China
- Height: 1.80 m (5 ft 11 in)
- Position: Midfielder

Youth career
- –2020: Shandong Luneng Taishan

Senior career*
Years	Team	Apps	(Gls)
2020	Los Garres	2	(0)
2021	Beijing BSU	5	(0)
2022–2024	Jiangxi Beidamen	25	(0)
2025	Ganzhou Ruishi	0	(0)
- * Club domestic league appearances and goals as of 14:01, 01 July 2024 (UTC)

Liu Zipeng (Chinese: 刘子鹏; born 4 June 2000) is a Chinese footballer who plays as a midfielder.

== Club career ==
On 22 April 2022, Liu Zipeng joined second tier club Jiangxi Beidamen on a free transfer and given the shirt number 31. He made his debut for the club in a league game on 4 July 2022, against Qingdao Hainiu in a 1-1 draw. On 20 February 2024, he extended his contract with club.

== Career statistics ==
=== Club ===
As of 01 July 2024.

Club	Season	League			Cup		Other		Total	
Club	Season	Division	Apps	Goals	Apps	Goals	Apps	Goals	Apps	Goals
Los Garres	2019–20	Tercera División	2	0	0	0	0	0	2	0
Beijing BSU	2021	China League One	5	0	2 (Note: Appearances in the Chinese FA Cup)	0	0	0	7	0
Jiangxi Beidamen	2022	China League One	10	0	1	0	0	0	2	0
Jiangxi Beidamen	2023	China League One	13	0	1	0	0	0	0	0
Jiangxi Beidamen	2024	China League One	2	0	0	0	0	0	2	0
Jiangxi Beidamen	Total		25	0	3	0	0	0	28	0
Career total			32	0	4	0	0	0	36	0
