= Caysar Adiljan =

Chinese association football player

Personal information
- Date of birth: 3 June 1999 (age 27)
- Place of birth: Ürümqi, Xinjiang, China
- Height: 1.70 m (5 ft 7 in)
- Position: Midfielder

Team information
- Current team: Suzhou Dongwu
- Number: 20

Youth career
- –2020: Beijing Sinobo Guoan

Senior career*
Years	Team	Apps	(Gls)
2020	Hubei Istar	8	(3)
2021-2022	Wuhan Three Towns	7	(0)
2022	Suzhou Dongwu (loan)	11	(0)
2023-	Suzhou Dongwu	5	(0)
- * Club domestic league appearances and goals as of 14:01, 16 January 2022 (UTC)

Caysar Adiljan (Chinese: 开赛尔·阿迪力江; born 3 June 1999) is a Chinese footballer currently playing as a midfielder for Suzhou Dongwu.

== Career statistics ==
=== Club ===
As of 16 January 2022.

Club	Season	League			Cup		Other		Total	
Club	Season	Division	Apps	Goals	Apps	Goals	Apps	Goals	Apps	Goals
Hubei Istar	2020	China League Two	8	3	0	0	0	0	8	3
Wuhan Three Towns	2021	China League One	7	0	1 (Note: Appearances in the Chinese FA Cup)	0	0	0	8	0
Wuhan Three Towns	2022	Chinese Super League	0	0	0	0	0	0	0	0
Wuhan Three Towns	Total		7	0	1	0	0	0	8	0
Career total			15	3	1	0	0	0	16	3
