= Akramjan Salajidin =

Chinese association football player

Personal information
- Date of birth: 12 March 1991 (age 35)
- Height: 1.88 m (6 ft 2 in)
- Position: Goalkeeper

Team information
- Current team: Yanbian Longding

Senior career*
Years	Team	Apps	(Gls)
2017–2021	Xinjiang Tianshan Leopard	44	(0)
2022-2023	Yanbian Longding	14	(0)
- * Club domestic league appearances and goals as of 14:01, 29 April 2022 (UTC)

Akramjan Salajidin (Chinese: 艾克拉木江·司拉吉丁; born 12 March 1991) is a Chinese footballer currently playing as a goalkeeper.

== Career statistics ==
=== Club ===
As of 9 August 2021.

Club	Season	League			Cup		Other		Total	
Club	Season	Division	Apps	Goals	Apps	Goals	Apps	Goals	Apps	Goals
Xinjiang Tianshan Leopard	2017	China League One	5	0	0	0	0	0	5	0
Xinjiang Tianshan Leopard	2018	China League One	0	0	0	0	0	0	0	0
Xinjiang Tianshan Leopard	2019	China League One	0	0	0	0	0	0	0	0
Xinjiang Tianshan Leopard	2020	China League One	14	0	0	0	0	0	14	0
Xinjiang Tianshan Leopard	2021	China League One	8	0	0	0	0	0	8	0
Career total			27	0	0	0	0	0	27	0
