= Wang Lingke =

Chinese footballer (born 2002)

Personal information
- Date of birth: 30 May 2002 (age 24)
- Place of birth: Kaiyuan, Yunnan, China
- Position: Midfielder

Team information
- Current team: Shijiazhuang Gongfu
- Number: 30

Youth career
- Kaiyuan Junior Sports School
- 2014–2015: Atlético Madrid
- Kunming FA

Senior career*
Years	Team	Apps	(Gls)
2019–2021	BTU United	0	(0)
2021–2022	Kunming Zheng He Shipman	17	(1)
2022–	Shijiazhuang Gongfu	7	(1)

International career
2020	China U19		
- * Club domestic league appearances and goals as of 14:01, 26 January 2023 (UTC)

Wang Lingke (Chinese: 王龄可; born 30 May 2002) is a Chinese footballer currently playing as a midfielder for Shijiazhuang Gongfu.

== Club career ==
Wang was born in Kaiyuan, Yunnan, and started his career at the Kaiyuan Junior Sports School. He spent two years with the Atlético Madrid youth team, as part of the Wanda Group "China Football Hope Star" initiative to encourage the development of young Chinese footballers.

In August 2018, having studied in Slovenia earlier in the year, he represented the Honghe prefectural football team. The following year, he moved to Thai League 2 side BTU United. However, by 2021, it was reported that Wang had not appeared for BTU United at all.

On 12 April 2021, Wang was announced as a new player for Kunming Zheng He Shipman. After one year with the China League Two club, he joined Shijiazhuang Gongfu.

== International career ==
Wang was called up to the China under-17 team training in 2017, and the under-19 squad in 2020.

== Career statistics ==
=== Club ===
As of 26 January 2023.

Appearances and goals by club, season and competition
Club	Season	League			Cup		Other		Total	
Club	Season	Division	Apps	Goals	Apps	Goals	Apps	Goals	Apps	Goals
Kunming Zheng He Shipman	2021	China League Two	17	1	2 (Note: Appearances in the Chinese FA Cup)	0	0	0	19	1
Shijiazhuang Gongfu	2022	China League One	7	1	2	0	0	0	9	1
Career total			24	2	4	0	0	0	28	2
