= Yang Zihao =

Chinese association football player

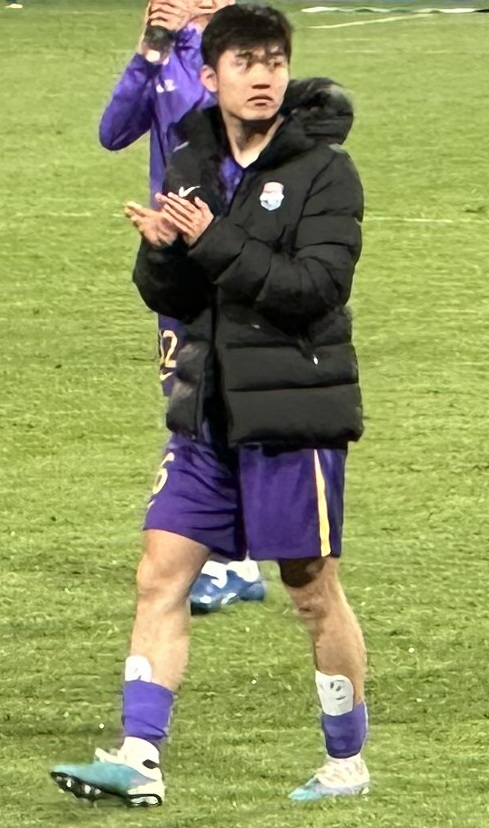
- Yang Zihao in April 2025

Personal information
- Date of birth: 7 January 2001 (age 25)
- Place of birth: Nanchang, Jiangxi, China
- Height: 1.80 m (5 ft 11 in)
- Position: Left-back

Team information
- Current team: Yunnan Yukun
- Number: 21

Youth career
- Shanghai Shenxin
- –2021: Shanghai Port

Senior career*
Years	Team	Apps	(Gls)
2020	China U19 (loan)	7	(0)
2021	→ Tianjin Jinmen Tiger (loan)	4	(1)
2022–2025	Tianjin Jinmen Tiger	66	(0)
2026–	Yunnan Yukun	0	(0)

International career
2023–2024	China U23	7	(0)
- * Club domestic league appearances and goals as of 26 August 2025

Yang Zihao (Chinese: 杨梓豪; born 7 January 2001) is a Chinese footballer currently playing as a left-back for Yunnan Yukun.

== Club career ==
Yang Zihao played for the Shanghai Shenxin and the Shanghai Port youth teams before he was loaned out to the China U19 team, which was allowed to participate in the 2020 China League Two campaign. He would go on to make his debut in a league game against Zibo Cuju on 29 October 2020 in a 3-1 defeat, where he came on as a substitute for Song Bowei. The following season, he would be loaned out again, this time to top-tier club Tianjin Jinmen Tiger, where he debuted in a league game on 11 May 2021 in a 1-0 defeat. Within that campaign, he would also score his first goal on 17 May 2021, in a league game against Wuhan F.C. in a 2-1 victory. On 28 April 2022, Tianjin officially made his move permanent before the start of the 2022 Chinese Super League season. On 31 December 2025, Yang announced his departure after the 2025 season.

On 5 January 2026, Yang joined Chinese Super League club Yunnan Yukun.

== Career statistics ==
As of 31 December 2024.

Club	Season	League			Cup		Continental		Other		Total	
Club	Season	Division	Apps	Goals	Apps	Goals	Apps	Goals	Apps	Goals	Apps	Goals
China U19 (loan)	2020	China League Two	7	0	–		–		–		7	0
Tianjin Jinmen Tiger (loan)	2021	Chinese Super League	4	1	0	0	–		–		4	1
Tianjin Jinmen Tiger	2022	Chinese Super League	8	0	1	0	–		–		9	0
Tianjin Jinmen Tiger	2023	Chinese Super League	9	0	2	0	–		–		11	0
Tianjin Jinmen Tiger	2024	Chinese Super League	23	0	2	0	–		–		25	0
Tianjin Jinmen Tiger	Total		40	0	5	0	0	0	0	0	45	0
Career total			51	1	5	0	0	0	0	0	56	1
