= Ma Shuai (footballer, born 1998) =

Chinese association football player

Personal information
- Date of birth: 12 May 1998 (age 28)
- Place of birth: Luoyang, Henan, China
- Height: 1.76 m (5 ft 9 in)
- Position: Midfielder

Youth career
- Shandong Taishan

Senior career*
Years	Team	Apps	(Gls)
2019–2021	Shandong Taishan	0	(0)
2019	→ Desportivo Brasil (loan)	0	(0)
2022	Zibo Cuju	14	(0)
2023	Tai'an Tiankuang	13	(2)
2024	Shijiazhuang Gongfu	0	(0)
- * Club domestic league appearances and goals as of 14:01, 25 July 2022 (UTC)

Ma Shuai (Chinese: 马帅; born 12 May 1998) is a Chinese footballer who plays as a midfielder.

== Club career ==
In 2021, during his time with Shandong Taishan, Ma helped out at a special education school alongside teammate Gao Shuo.

== Career statistics ==
=== Club ===
As of 25 July 2022.

Club	Season	League			Cup		Continental		Other		Total	
Club	Season	Division	Apps	Goals	Apps	Goals	Apps	Goals	Apps	Goals	Apps	Goals
Shandong Taishan	2019	Chinese Super League	0	0	0	0	–		0	0	0	0
Shandong Taishan	2020	Chinese Super League	0	0	0	0	–		0	0	0	0
Shandong Taishan	2021	Chinese Super League	0	0	0	0	–		0	0	0	0
Shandong Taishan	2022	Chinese Super League	0	0	0	0	–		0	0	0	0
Shandong Taishan	Total		0	0	0	0	0	0	0	0	0	0
Desportivo Brasil (loan)	2019	–			0	0	–		4 (Note: Appearances in the Copa Paulista)	0	4	0
Zibo Cuju	2022	China League One	1	0	0	0	–		0	0	1	0
Career total			1	0	0	0	0	0	4	0	5	0
