= Luo Xin (footballer, born 2000) =

Chinese footballer

Personal information
- Date of birth: 27 January 2000 (age 26)
- Place of birth: Chengdu, Sichuan, China
- Height: 1.75 m (5 ft 9 in)
- Position: Defender

Youth career
- Chengdu Rongcheng

Senior career*
Years	Team	Apps	(Gls)
2019-2020	Tubize	7	(0)
2020–2022	Chengdu Rongcheng	11	(0)
2021	→ Sichuan Minzu (loan)	11	(0)
2022	→ Shijiazhuang Gongfu (loan)	22	(0)
2023	Zibo Qisheng	19	(0)
- * Club domestic league appearances and goals as of 8 January 2023

Luo Xin (Chinese: 罗新; born 27 January 2000) is a Chinese footballer who plays as a defender.

== Club career ==
In 2019, Luo signed for third tier Belgian side Tubize for the 2019–20 Belgian First Amateur Division campaign. He would make his debut in a league game on 31 August 2019 against Sint-Eloois-Winkel in a 0-0 draw. Before the 2020 season, he signed for Chengdu Rongcheng in the Chinese second division. On 12 September 2020, he debuted for Chengdu Rongcheng in a league game during a 3-2 win over Beijing Renhe.

In 2021, Luo was sent on loan to Chinese third division club Sichuan Minzu. This was followed by another loan, this time to a second tier club Shijiazhuang Gongfu for 2022 league campaign.

== Career statistics ==
As of 8 January 2023.

Appearances and goals by club, season and competition
Club	Season	League			Cup		Continental		Other		Total	
Club	Season	Division	Apps	Goals	Apps	Goals	Apps	Goals	Apps	Goals	Apps	Goals
Tubize	2019-20	Belgian First Amateur Division	7	0	-		-		-		7	0
Chengdu Rongcheng	2020	China League One	11	0	1	0	-		-		12	0
Sichuan Minzu (loan)	2021	China League Two	11	0	1	0	-		-		12	0
Shijiazhuang Gongfu (loan)	2022	China League One	22	0	0	0	-		-		22	0
Career total			51	0	2	0	0	0	0	0	53	0
