= Li Xinyu (footballer) =

Chinese association football player

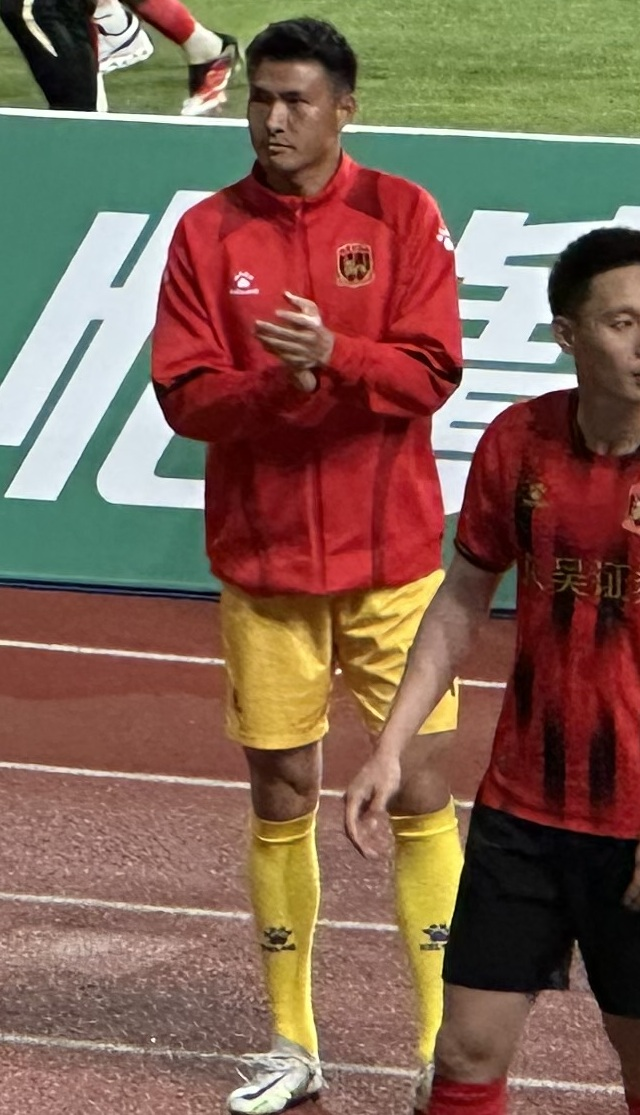
- Li Xinyu in May 2025

Personal information
- Date of birth: 21 August 1996 (age 30)
- Place of birth: Yangzhou, Jiangsu, China
- Height: 1.85 m (6 ft 1 in)
- Position: Goalkeeper

Team information
- Current team: Jiangsu Changjin

Youth career
- 2010–2016: Jiangsu Sainty
- 2016: Gondomar

Senior career*
Years	Team	Apps	(Gls)
2016–2018	Gondomar B	3	(0)
2017	→ Tianjin TEDA (loan)	0	(0)
2018–2021	Meizhou Hakka	4	(0)
2022	Liaoning Shenyang Urban	9	(0)
2023–2025	Suzhou Dongwu	38	(0)
2026–	Jiangsu Changjin	0	(0)

International career^{‡}
2016	China U19		
2017	China U20	1	(0)
2017	China U22	2	(0)
- * Club domestic league appearances and goals as of 14:05, 8 March 2026 (UTC) ‡ National team caps and goals as of 14:01, 26 July 2021 (UTC)

Li Xinyu (Chinese: 李新宇; born 21 August 1996), formerly known as Li Zheng (Chinese: 李峥), is a Chinese footballer currently playing as a goalkeeper for Jiangsu Changjin.

== Club career ==
Li Xinyu would go abroad to Portugal to start his professional career with Gondomar and especially the Gondomar B team before returning to China with Tianjin TEDA on loan and then a permanent move with second tier club Meizhou Hakka, where he would make his debut in a 2018 Chinese FA Cup game on 11 April 2018 against Hainan Boying that ended in a defeat on penalties after a 0-0 draw. He would be utilized as a reserve choice goalkeeper and be part of the squad that gained promotion to the top tier after coming second within the division at the end of the 2021 China League One campaign.

He would join another second tier club in Liaoning Shenyang Urban on 27 April 2022 and would make his debut for them in a league game on 5 August 2022 against Shijiazhuang Gongfu in a 2-1 defeat.

== Career statistics ==
As of 21 October 2023.

Club	Season	League			Cup		Continental		Other		Total	
Club	Season	Division	Apps	Goals	Apps	Goals	Apps	Goals	Apps	Goals	Apps	Goals
Gondomar B	2016–17	AF Porto Divisão de Elite	3	0	0	0	–		–		3	0
Tianjin TEDA (loan)	2017	Chinese Super League	0	0	0	0	–		–		0	0
Meizhou Hakka	2018	China League One	0	0	1	0	–		–		1	0
Meizhou Hakka	2019	China League One	0	0	1	0	–		–		1	0
Meizhou Hakka	2020	China League One	1	0	0	0	–		–		1	0
Meizhou Hakka	2021	China League One	3	0	1	0	–		–		3	0
Meizhou Hakka	Total		4	0	3	0	0	0	0	0	7	0
Liaoning Shenyang Urban	2022	China League One	9	0	0	0	–		–		9	0
Suzhou Dongwu	2023	China League One	9	0	2	0	–		–		11	0
Career total			25	0	5	0	0	0	0	0	30	0
