= List of Chinese football transfers winter 2021 =

This is a list of Chinese football transfers for the 2021 season winter transfer window.

== Super League ==
=== Beijing Guoan ===
In:

No.	Pos.	Nation	Player
15	MF	CHN	Gao Tianyi (from Jiangsu)
19	DF	CHN	Liu Huan (loan return from Chongqing Liangjiang Athletic)
26	MF	CHN	Bai Yang (Free agent)
28	FW	CHN	Dongda He (loan from (England) Wolverhampton Wanderers)
30	MF	BRA	Lucas Souza (loan from Changchun Yatai)
37	MF	CHN	Cao Yongjing (from Beijing Renhe)
-	DF	BIH	Toni Šunjić (loan return from Henan Songshan Longmen)
-	DF	CHN	Zhang Yu (loan return from Changchun Yatai)
-	DF	CHN	Zheng Yiming (loan return from Xi'an Wolves)

Out:

No.	Pos.	Nation	Player
19	FW	CHN	Alan (loan return to Guangzhou)
26	MF	CHN	Lü Peng (to Qingdao)
28	DF	CHN	Jiang Tao (Released)
29	FW	CHN	Ba Dun (loan to Tianjin Jinmen Tiger)
39	FW	CHN	Wen Da (loan to Beijing BSU)
53	MF	CHN	Li Jingrun (to Xinjiang Tianshan Leopard)
58	MF	CHN	Mu Jiaxin (to Beijing BSU)
-	GK	CHN	Guo Hanru (to Hebei)
-	FW	CHN	Ning Weichen (to Xi'an Wolves)
-	MF	CHN	Hu Yanqiang (to Xi'an Wolves)
-	DF	BIH	Toni Šunjić (to Henan Songshan Longmen)
-	DF	CHN	Zhang Yu (to Changchun Yatai)
-	DF	CHN	Zheng Yiming (loan to Xinjiang Tianshan Leopard)

=== Cangzhou Mighty Lions ===
In:

No.	Pos.	Nation	Player
5	DF	CHN	Yan Zihao (from Qingdao)
8	MF	CHN	Lin Chuangyi (from Shanghai Port)
9	MF	NOR	Adama Diomande (from (United States) Los Angeles FC)
11	MF	CHN	Xie Pengfei (from Jiangsu)
12	MF	CHN	Luo Jing (from Jiangsu)
15	MF	CHN	Sabit Abdusalam (from Xinjiang Tianshan Leopard)
16	DF	CHN	Zheng Kaimu (from Tianjin Jinmen Tiger)
22	MF	CHN	Guo Hao (from Tianjin Jinmen Tiger)
24	MF	CHN	Abduhamit Abdugheni (from Jiangsu)
25	MF	UZB	Odil Ahmedov (from Shanghai Port)
27	MF	CHN	Ma Fuyu (from Jiangsu)
28	FW	SEN	André Senghor (from Inner Mongolia Zhongyou)
30	DF	CHN	Liu Yang (from Tianjin Jinmen Tiger)
31	MF	CHN	Chen Zhongliu (from Suzhou Dongwu)
32	FW	CHN	Zhao Xuebin (from Dalian Pro)
33	MF	CHN	Zhang Xiangshuo (from Shaanxi Warriors Beyond)
35	MF	CHN	Hu Shengjia (from Jiangsu)
37	FW	CHN	Bughrahan Skandar (loan from Guangzhou)
-	FW	CHN	Tan Xiang (loan return from Hunan Billows)

Out:

No.	Pos.	Nation	Player
2	DF	CHN	Wang Peng (loan to Xi'an Wolves)
3	DF	CHN	Cao Xuan (Released)
4	MF	CHN	Chen Zitong (to Zibo Cuju)
5	DF	CHN	Zhao Jianfei (loan return to Shandong Taishan)
8	MF	BRA	Rômulo (to (Brazil) Vasco da Gama)
10	FW	BRA	Matheus (Released)
15	MF	CHN	Wang Peng (loan return to Shenzhen)
17	FW	CHN	Wang Zihao (loan to Beijing BIT)
21	MF	CHN	Chen Pu (loan return to Shandong Taishan)
22	MF	CHN	Zhong Jiyu (Released)
25	MF	CHN	Liu Chaoyang (loan return to Shandong Taishan)
27	FW	CHN	Liu Ziming (loan to Zibo Cuju)
28	MF	CHN	Deng Yubiao (loan return to Guangzhou)
30	DF	CHN	Ma Chongchong (Released)
46	FW	CHN	Wang Jinze (loan return to Guangzhou)
63	FW	CHN	Pan Chaoran (to Heilongjiang Ice City)
-	MF	CHN	Zhan Minwei (loan to Beijing BIT)
-	DF	CHN	Wu Haoran (to Zibo Cuju)
-	MF	CHN	Tan Xiang (loan to Beijing BIT)

=== Changchun Yatai ===
In:

No.	Pos.	Nation	Player
4	DF	DEN	Jores Okore (from (Denmark) AaB)
6	DF	CHN	Zhang Yu (from Beijing Guoan)
8	FW	NED	Richairo Zivkovic (loan return from Guangzhou City)
9	FW	BRA	Júnior Negrão (from (South Korea) Ulsan Hyundai)
11	FW	BRA	Erik (from (Brazil) Palmeiras)
16	DF	CHN	Jiang Zhe (loan from Chongqing Liangjiang Athletic)
19	FW	CHN	Hui Jiakang (from Tianjin Jinmen Tiger)
20	MF	CHN	Zhang Yufeng (from Beijing Renhe)
25	MF	CHN	Wang Peng (loan from Shenzhen)
30	MF	CHN	Sun Qinhan (loan from Shanghai Shenhua)
39	DF	CHN	Mao Kaiyu (from Heilongjiang Ice City)
-	MF	CHN	Sun Jun (loan return from Xi'an Wolves)
-	DF	CHN	Ren Peng (loan return from Zhejiang Yiteng)
-	DF	CHN	Li Xiaoming (loan return from Suzhou Dongwu)
-	DF	CHN	Zhu Mingxin (loan return from Jiangxi Beidamen)

Out:

No.	Pos.	Nation	Player
4	DF	CHN	Zhang Yu (loan return to Beijing Guoan)
8	MF	BRA	Lucas Souza (loan to Beijing Guoan)
9	FW	CHN	Gao Di (loan return to Shanghai Shenhua)
11	MF	CHN	Xue Ya'nan (loan to Hebei Zhuoao)
14	GK	CHN	Dong Yifan (to Zibo Cuju)
16	FW	CHN	Tan Tiancheng (loan to Xi'an Wolves)
30	MF	CHN	Zhao Mingyu (loan to Nanjing City)
56	MF	CHN	Huang Ruifeng (loan return to Shenzhen)
-	MF	CHN	Fan Xiaodong (to Suzhou Dongwu)
-	DF	CHN	Li Xiaoming (to Suzhou Dongwu)
-	DF	CHN	Zhu Mingxin (loan to Jiangxi Beidamen)

=== Chongqing Liangjiang Athletic ===
In:

No.	Pos.	Nation	Player
1	GK	CHN	Chen Zhao (from Shanghai Shenhua)
6	DF	CHN	Jiang Shenglong (loan from Shanghai Shenhua)
8	DF	CHN	Sun Kai (from Shanghai Shenhua)
21	MF	CHN	Hu Xingyu (loan return from Suzhou Dongwu)
23	MF	ECU	Miller Bolaños (loan from Shanghai Shenhua)
24	MF	CHN	Baxtiyar Pezila (loan return from (Spain) Recreativo Granada)
31	MF	CHN	Zhang Xingbo (from Liaoning Shenyang Urban)
33	DF	UZB	Dostonbek Tursunov (from (South Korea) Busan IPark)
-	MF	POL	Adrian Mierzejewski (loan return from Guangzhou City)
-	MF	CHN	Ding Jie (loan return from Zhejiang Yiteng)
-	FW	CHN	Huang Lei (loan return from Suzhou Dongwu)

Out:

No.	Pos.	Nation	Player
5	DF	CHN	Jiang Zhe (loan to Changchun Yatai)
17	GK	CHN	Sui Weijie (to Shanxi Longjin)
19	DF	CHN	Liu Huan (loan return to Beijing Guoan)
24	DF	CHN	Chen Kejiang (loan to Shanxi Longjin)
26	DF	CHN	Yuan Mincheng (to Shenzhen)
27	FW	BRA	Alan Kardec (to Shenzhen)
28	DF	CHN	Cao Dong (loan to Suzhou Dongwu)
33	DF	CHN	Dilmurat Mawlanyaz (to Henan Songshan Longmen)
41	MF	CHN	Jiang Yu (to Zibo Cuju)
48	MF	CHN	Xirzat Helil (to Xinjiang Tianshan Leopard)
-	MF	POL	Adrian Mierzejewski (loan to Shanghai Shenhua)
-	MF	CHN	Ding Jie (loan to Shaanxi Chang'an Athletic)
-	FW	CHN	Huang Lei (loan to Suzhou Dongwu)

=== Dalian Pro ===
In:

No.	Pos.	Nation	Player
32	GK	CHN	Kudirat Ablet (from (Portugal) Gondomar)
37	MF	CHN	Yang Haoyu (loan from Hubei Istar)
-	MF	CHN	Liu Yingchen (loan return from Beijing Renhe)

Out:

No.	Pos.	Nation	Player
8	FW	CHN	Zhu Ting (to Qingdao)
9	FW	VEN	Salomón Rondón (loan to (Russia) CSKA Moscow)
12	DF	CHN	Zhou Ting (Retired)
17	MF	SVK	Marek Hamšík (to (Sweden) IFK Göteborg)
25	DF	CHN	Li Jianbin (to Chengdu Rongcheng)
37	MF	CHN	Yang Haoyu (loan return to Hubei Istar)
63	MF	CHN	Hu Jiali (to Qingdao)
-	GK	CHN	Xue Qinghao (to Shanghai Shenhua)
-	FW	CHN	Zhao Xuebin (to Cangzhou Mighty Lions)
-	FW	HKG	Alex Akande (to (Hong Kong) Kitchee)
-	DF	CHN	Yang Zexiang (to Shanghai Shenhua)
-	MF	CHN	Li Qinghao (to Jiangxi Beidamen)
-	MF	CHN	Zheng Bofan (loan to Kunshan)
-	MF	CHN	Liu Yingchen (loan to Xi'an Wolves)

=== Guangzhou ===
In:

No.	Pos.	Nation	Player
11	MF	CHN	Ricardo Goulart (loan return from Hebei)
18	FW	CHN	Alan (loan return from Beijing Guoan)
-	MF	CHN	Zhang Wenzhao (loan return from Beijing Renhe)
-	DF	CHN	Wang Wenxuan (loan return from Inner Mongolia Zhongyou)
-	DF	CHN	Chen Quanjiang (loan return from Inner Mongolia Zhongyou)
-	MF	CHN	Fan Hengbo (loan return from Inner Mongolia Zhongyou)
-	MF	CHN	Zhang Zheng (loan return from Inner Mongolia Zhongyou)
-	FW	CHN	Seydar Siyitjan (loan return from Inner Mongolia Zhongyou)
-	FW	CHN	Wang Jinze (loan return from Cangzhou Mighty Lions)
-	DF	CHN	Anizirjan Askar (loan return from Beijing BSU)
-	FW	CHN	Li Ming (loan return from Beijing BSU)
-	MF	CHN	Zhao Shizhuo (loan return from Inner Mongolia Caoshangfei)
-	DF	CHN	Zhang Zichao (loan return from Inner Mongolia Caoshangfei)
-	FW	CHN	Chen Yu (loan return from Inner Mongolia Caoshangfei)
-	MF	CHN	Zhou Pinxi (loan return from Inner Mongolia Caoshangfei)
-	DF	CHN	Cai Andong (loan return from Inner Mongolia Caoshangfei)
-	MF	CHN	Jiang Zhengjie (loan return from Inner Mongolia Caoshangfei)
-	MF	CHN	Lu Tianming (loan return from Inner Mongolia Caoshangfei)
-	FW	CHN	Yu Shanwen (loan return from Qingdao Youth Island)
-	GK	CHN	Zhang Yulei (loan return from Qingdao Youth Island)
-	DF	CHN	Ma Sheng (loan return from Qingdao Youth Island)
-	MF	CHN	Chen Zhengfeng (loan return from Xi'an UKD)
-	MF	CHN	Feng Boxuan (loan return from Henan Songshan Longmen)
-	DF	CHN	Feng Xiaoting (loan return from Shanghai Shenhua)
-	GK	CHN	Zeng Cheng (loan return from Shanghai Shenhua)
-	DF	CHN	Zhang Chenglin (loan return from Wuhan)
-	MF	CHN	Tang Shi (loan return from Beijing BSU)
-	MF	CHN	Cai Mingmin (loan return from Qingdao Youth Island)
-	DF	CHN	Guo Jing (loan return from Henan Songshan Longmen)
-	MF	CHN	Deng Yubiao (loan return from Cangzhou Mighty Lions)
-	MF	CHN	Xiao Taotao (loan return from Kunshan)
-	MF	CHN	Eysajan Kurban (loan return from Qingdao Youth Island)
-	DF	CHN	Yang Zhaohui (loan return from Beijing Renhe)
-	DF	CHN	Rong Hao (loan return from Tianjin Jinmen Tiger)
-	FW	CHN	Wang Jingbin (loan return from Liaoning Shenyang Urban)
-	GK	CHN	Mai Gaoling (loan return from Inner Mongolia Zhongyou)
-	MF	CHN	Zheng Shengxiong (loan return from Sichuan Jiuniu)

Out:

No.	Pos.	Nation	Player
12	MF	CHN	Xu Xin (to Shandong Taishan)
22	FW	CHN	Parmanjan Kyum (loan to Henan Songshan Longmen)
23	DF	KOR	Park Ji-soo (to (South Korea) Suwon FC)
38	DF	CHN	Liu Yiming (loan to Wuhan Three Towns)
60	FW	CHN	Bughrahan Skandar (loan to Cangzhou Mighty Lions)
-	FW	CHN	Afrden Asqer (to Suzhou Dongwu)
-	DF	CHN	Hu Ruibao (to Guangzhou City)
-	MF	CHN	Feng Boxuan (loan to Henan Songshan Longmen)
-	DF	CHN	Feng Xiaoting (to Shanghai Shenhua)
-	GK	CHN	Zeng Cheng (to Shanghai Shenhua)
-	DF	CHN	Zhang Chenglin (loan to Kunshan)
-	MF	CHN	Tang Shi (loan to Meizhou Hakka)
-	MF	CHN	Cai Mingmin (loan to Kunshan)
-	DF	CHN	Guo Jing (loan to Suzhou Dongwu)
-	MF	CHN	Deng Yubiao (loan to Suzhou Dongwu)
-	MF	CHN	Xiao Taotao (loan to Kunshan)
-	MF	CHN	Eysajan Kurban (to Zhejiang)
-	DF	CHN	Yang Zhaohui (loan to Suzhou Dongwu)
-	DF	CHN	Rong Hao (to Wuhan Three Towns)
-	FW	CHN	Wang Jingbin (to Liaoning Shenyang Urban)
-	GK	CHN	Mai Gaoling (loan to Beijing BSU)
-	MF	CHN	Zheng Shengxiong (loan to Sichuan Jiuniu)

=== Guangzhou City ===
In:

No.	Pos.	Nation	Player
5	DF	CHN	Hu Ruibao (from Guangzhou)
6	MF	CHN	Fan Yunlong (loan return from Guizhou)
7	MF	COL	Edwin Cardona (from (Mexico) Tijuana)
9	FW	BRA	Tiago Leonço (from R&F (Hong Kong))
12	MF	BRA	Guilherme (from (Portugal) Santa Cruz Alvarenga)
13	MF	SWE	Gustav Svensson (from (United States) Seattle Sounders FC)
15	DF	CHN	Han Pengfei (loan from Wuhan)
23	GK	CHN	Zhou Yuchen (from Shandong Taishan)
27	DF	CHN	Yang Xiaotian (from Jiangsu)
-	DF	CHN	Zheng Zhiming (loan return from Shenzhen Bogang)
-	MF	CHN	Chen Yajun (loan return from Shenzhen Bogang)
-	FW	CHN	Gui Hong (loan return from Guizhou)
-	DF	CHN	Zou Zheng (loan return from Qingdao)

Out:

No.	Pos.	Nation	Player
3	DF	SRB	Duško Tošić (to (Turkey) Kasımpaşa)
5	DF	CHN	Li Songyi (loan return to Shandong Taishan)
6	MF	POL	Adrian Mierzejewski (loan return to Chongqing Liangjiang Athletic)
9	FW	NED	Richairo Zivkovic (loan return to Changchun Yatai)
11	MF	BRA	Renatinho (to (Brazil) Ponte Preta)
23	MF	CHN	Lu Lin (to Meizhou Hakka)
25	DF	CHN	Chen Zhechao (loan return to Shandong Taishan)
-	GK	CHN	Yin Tianlong (to Heilongjiang Ice City)
-	FW	CHN	Liu Wenjie (to Jiangxi Beidamen)
-	FW	CHN	Ma Junliang (to Shaanxi Chang'an Athletic)
-	FW	CHN	Gui Hong (loan to Meizhou Hakka)
-	DF	CHN	Zou Zheng (loan to Qingdao)

=== Hebei ===
In:

No.	Pos.	Nation	Player
6	MF	NOR	Ole Selnæs (loan from Shenzhen)
9	DF	CHN	Gong Qiule (loan return from Wuhan Three Towns)
14	MF	CHN	Feng Gang (loan return from Zhejiang)
16	MF	CHN	Chen Yunhua (loan return from Wuhan Three Towns)
20	DF	CHN	Chico Chen (loan from (Portugal) Cova da Piedade)
27	MF	CHN	Zu Pengchao (from Shenzhen)
31	GK	CHN	Guo Hanru (from Beijing Guoan)
34	GK	CHN	Pang Jiajun (from Inner Mongolia Zhongyou)
35	MF	CHN	Jin Qiang (loan from Shenzhen)
36	MF	CHN	Yao Daogang (from (Portugal) Gondomar)
39	MF	CHN	Yao Xuchen (loan return from Inner Mongolia Zhongyou)
40	MF	CHN	Zhang Hui (loan return from Wuhan Three Towns)
-	MF	CHN	Chen Ao (loan return from Wuhan)
-	DF	CHN	Luan Haodong (loan return from Wuhan Three Towns)
-	DF	HKG	Andy Russell (loan return from Jiangxi Beidamen)
-	MF	CHN	Merdanjan Abduklijan (loan return from Qingdao Youth Island)
-	GK	CHN	Geng Xiaofeng (loan return from Inner Mongolia Zhongyou)

Out:

No.	Pos.	Nation	Player
3	MF	CHN	Zhao Yuhao (loan to Henan Songshan Longmen)
4	DF	CHN	Jin Yangyang (to Shanghai Shenhua)
6	MF	CHN	Luo Senwen (loan to Wuhan Three Towns)
11	FW	SLE	Buya Turay (to Henan Songshan Longmen)
16	MF	CHN	Ricardo Goulart (loan return to Guangzhou)
17	FW	CHN	Luo Shipeng (loan to Qingdao Youth Island)
23	DF	CHN	Ren Hang (loan to Wuhan Three Towns)
-	DF	CHN	Zheng Haokun (to Suzhou Dongwu)
-	FW	CHN	Dong Xuesheng (to Wuhan)
-	GK	CHN	Geng Xiaofeng (loan to Wuhan Three Towns)

=== Henan Songshan Longmen ===
In:

No.	Pos.	Nation	Player
3	MF	CHN	Zhao Yuhao (loan from Hebei)
10	FW	SLE	Buya Turay (from Hebei)
12	MF	CHN	Chen Pu (loan from Shandong Taishan)
16	FW	CHN	Parmanjan Kyum (loan from Guangzhou)
20	MF	CHN	Feng Boxuan (loan from Guangzhou)
23	DF	BIH	Toni Šunjić (from Beijing Guoan)
33	DF	CHN	Dilmurat Mawlanyaz (from Chongqing Liangjiang Athletic)
36	MF	CHN	Ahmat Tursunjan (loan from Hubei Istar)

Out:

No.	Pos.	Nation	Player
2	DF	CHN	Guo Jing (loan return to Guangzhou)
3	DF	CHN	Zhang Wentao (loan to Wuhan Three Towns)
4	DF	CHN	Han Xuan (to Chengdu Rongcheng)
10	FW	CMR	Christian Bassogog (to Shanghai Shenhua)
12	FW	CHN	Du Changjie (to Shaanxi Chang'an Athletic)
14	MF	KOR	Kim Sung-hwan (to (South Korea) Hwaseong)
16	MF	CHN	Yang Kuo (to Wuhan Three Towns)
18	DF	CHN	Song Haiwang (loan to Quanzhou Yassin)
20	MF	CHN	Feng Boxuan (loan return to Guangzhou)
23	DF	BIH	Toni Šunjić (loan return to Beijing Guoan)
41	FW	CHN	Ablahan Haliq (to Shanghai Port)
-	MF	CHN	Liu Heng (to Zibo Cuju)
-	DF	CHN	Lu Yao (to Zibo Cuju)
-	DF	CHN	Liu Bin (to Chengdu Rongcheng)

=== Qingdao ===
In:

No.	Pos.	Nation	Player
5	DF	CHN	Li Peng (from Shanghai Shenhua)
6	MF	NOR	Fredrik Ulvestad (from (Sweden) Djurgården)
14	FW	CHN	Song Runtong (from Shanghai Shenhua)
16	MF	CHN	Lü Peng (from Beijing Guoan)
17	FW	CHN	Zhou Junchen (loan from Shanghai Shenhua)
19	FW	CHN	Zhu Ting (from Dalian Pro)
21	MF	CHN	Wang Wei (from Shanghai Shenhua)
24	MF	CHN	Hu Jiali (from Dalian Pro)
25	DF	CHN	Zou Zheng (loan from Guangzhou City)
27	FW	CHN	Zhu Jianrong (loan from Shanghai Shenhua)
31	DF	CHN	Liu Jian (from Beijing Renhe)
33	MF	CHN	Ji Xiaoxuan (from (France) Auxerre)
37	FW	CHN	Erpan Ezimjan (from Jiangsu)

Out:

No.	Pos.	Nation	Player
1	GK	CHN	Xing Yu (to Chengdu Rongcheng)
4	DF	TPE	Yaki Yen (to Wuhan Three Towns)
5	DF	CHN	Yan Zihao (to Cangzhou Mighty Lions)
6	MF	CHN	Wang Dong (Retired)
17	FW	CHN	Zhou Junchen (loan return to Shanghai Shenhua)
19	MF	CMR	Joseph Minala (loan return to (Italy) Lazio)
21	MF	CHN	Wang Wei (loan return to Shanghai Shenhua)
25	DF	CHN	Zou Zheng (loan return to Guangzhou City)
27	FW	CHN	Zhu Jianrong (loan return to Shanghai Shenhua)
33	DF	CHN	Shi Zhe (to Suzhou Dongwu)
37	DF	CHN	Yao Jiangshan (to Qingdao Jonoon)
51	DF	CHN	Cheng Rui (to Zibo Cuju)

=== Shandong Taishan ===
In:

No.	Pos.	Nation	Player
8	MF	CHN	Xu Xin (from Guangzhou)
9	FW	BRA	Leonardo (from (Japan) Urawa Red Diamonds)
20	DF	CHN	Chen Zhechao (loan return from Guangzhou City)
27	DF	CHN	Shi Ke (from Shanghai Port)
28	MF	KOR	Son Jun-ho (from (South Korea) Jeonbuk Hyundai Motors)
29	FW	CHN	Cheng Yuan (loan return from Taizhou Yuanda)
31	DF	CHN	Zhao Jianfei (loan return from Cangzhou Mighty Lions)
37	MF	CHN	Ji Xiang (from Jiangsu)
42	FW	CHN	Xie Wenneng (loan return from Zibo Cuju)
-	MF	CHN	Jia Feifan (loan return from Zibo Cuju)
-	MF	CHN	Xie Wenxi (loan return from Zibo Cuju)
-	MF	CHN	Cao Sheng (loan return from Zibo Cuju)
-	MF	CHN	Yang Yilin (loan return from Meizhou Hakka)
-	MF	CHN	Xu Anbang (loan return from Kunshan)
-	MF	CHN	Sun Rui (loan return from Inner Mongolia Zhongyou)
-	DF	CHN	Zeng Yuming (loan return from Beijing BSU)
-	MF	CHN	Luo Andong (loan return from Beijing Renhe)
-	FW	CHN	Zhang Tong (loan return from Inner Mongolia Caoshangfei)
-	MF	CHN	Wang Yong (loan return from Inner Mongolia Caoshangfei)
-	FW	CHN	Shi Yan (loan return from Inner Mongolia Caoshangfei)
-	MF	CHN	Yao Junsheng (loan return from Zhejiang)
-	FW	CHN	Fang Hao (loan return from Inner Mongolia Zhongyou)
-	MF	CHN	Chen Pu (loan return from Cangzhou Mighty Lions)
-	DF	CHN	Li Songyi (loan return from Guangzhou City)
-	MF	CHN	Liu Chaoyang (loan return from Cangzhou Mighty Lions)
-	FW	CHN	Ji Shengpan (loan return from Zibo Cuju)
-	FW	CHN	Tian Yuda (loan return from Hebei Zhuoao)
-	MF	CHN	Liu Changqi (from Zibo Cuju)

Out:

No.	Pos.	Nation	Player
4	DF	HUN	Tamás Kádár (loan to Tianjin Jinmen Tiger)
9	FW	ITA	Graziano Pellè (to (Italy) Parma)
20	FW	BRA	Leonardo (Released)
27	DF	CHN	Wu Lei (loan to Nanjing City)
28	MF	CHN	Chen Kerui (loan to Tianjin Jinmen Tiger)
40	DF	CHN	Lin Guoyu (loan to Wuhan)
46	DF	CHN	Zhang Chen (to Kunshan)
-	GK	CHN	Zhou Yuchen (to Guangzhou City)
-	MF	CHN	Yao Junsheng (to Zhejiang)
-	FW	CHN	Fang Hao (loan to Wuhan)
-	MF	CHN	Chen Pu (loan to Henan Songshan Longmen)
-	DF	CHN	Li Songyi (loan to Tianjin Jinmen Tiger)
-	MF	CHN	Liu Chaoyang (loan to Chengdu Rongcheng)
-	FW	CHN	Ji Shengpan (loan to Beijing BSU)
-	FW	CHN	Tian Yuda (loan to Beijing BSU)
-	MF	CHN	Liu Changqi (loan to Quanzhou Yassin)

=== Shanghai Port ===
In:

No.	Pos.	Nation	Player
2	DF	CHN	Li Ang (from Jiangsu)
5	DF	CRO	Ante Majstorović (from (Croatia) Osijek)
15	DF	CHN	Li Shenyuan (loan return from Inner Mongolia Zhongyou)
16	MF	CHN	Zhang Huachen (loan return from Nantong Zhiyun)
22	GK	CHN	Du Jia (from Tianjin Jinmen Tiger)
31	MF	CHN	Gao Haisheng (loan return from Guizhou)
36	FW	CHN	Ablahan Haliq (from Henan Songshan Longmen)
39	FW	CHN	Hu Jinghang (loan return from Wuhan)
-	DF	CHN	Wei Lai (loan return from Nantong Zhiyun)
-	FW	CHN	Huang Zhenfei (loan return from Inner Mongolia Zhongyou)
-	FW	CHN	Sun Guanou (loan return from Inner Mongolia Zhongyou)
-	DF	CHN	Zhu Jiayi (loan return from Inner Mongolia Zhongyou)
-	MF	CHN	Zhou Zheng (loan return from Inner Mongolia Zhongyou)
-	GK	CHN	Shi Xiaodong (loan return from Nantong Zhiyun)
-	MF	UZB	Odil Ahmedov (loan return from Tianjin Jinmen Tiger)
-	FW	CHN	Li Haowen (loan return from Suzhou Dongwu)
-	MF	CHN	Sun Enming (loan return from Zibo Cuju)

Out:

No.	Pos.	Nation	Player
5	DF	CHN	Shi Ke (to Shandong Taishan)
10	FW	BRA	Hulk (to (Brazil) Atlético Mineiro)
15	MF	CHN	Lin Chuangyi (to Cangzhou Mighty Lions)
22	GK	CHN	Sun Le (to Suzhou Dongwu)
36	FW	CHN	Shi Jian (to Xinjiang Tianshan Leopard)
37	MF	CHN	Huang Wenzhuo (to Xinjiang Tianshan Leopard)
41	GK	CHN	Sun Jiazheng (to Suzhou Dongwu)
-	MF	CHN	Yang Zihao (loan to Tianjin Jinmen Tiger)
-	DF	CHN	Wu Hang (to Xinjiang Tianshan Leopard)
-	GK	CHN	Shi Xiaodong (to Nantong Zhiyun)
-	MF	UZB	Odil Ahmedov (to Cangzhou Mighty Lions)
-	FW	CHN	Li Haowen (to Suzhou Dongwu)
-	MF	CHN	Sun Enming (loan to Nanjing City)

=== Shanghai Shenhua ===
In:

No.	Pos.	Nation	Player
4	DF	CHN	Jin Yangyang (from Hebei)
6	DF	CHN	Feng Xiaoting (from Guangzhou)
9	MF	POL	Adrian Mierzejewski (loan from Chongqing Liangjiang Athletic)
12	MF	CHN	Wu Xi (from Jiangsu)
17	FW	CMR	Christian Bassogog (from Henan Songshan Longmen)
18	DF	CHN	Denny Wang (Free agent) (Note: Player took Chinese citizenship to sign for club)
19	GK	CHN	Zeng Cheng (from Guangzhou)
22	DF	CRO	Matej Jonjić (from (Japan) Cerezo Osaka)
29	MF	CHN	He Longhai (Free agent)
31	GK	CHN	Xue Qinghao (from Dalian Pro)
-	FW	CHN	Wu Yizhen (loan return from Wuhan Three Towns)
-	MF	CHN	Xie Jinzheng (loan return from Qingdao Jonoon)
-	FW	CHN	Sun Xipeng (loan return from Qingdao Jonoon)
-	FW	NGA	Odion Ighalo (loan return from (England) Manchester United)
-	FW	CHN	Gao Di (loan return from Changchun Yatai)
-	DF	CHN	Jiang Shenglong (loan return from Tianjin Jinmen Tiger)
-	GK	CHN	Chen Zhao (loan return from Qingdao Jonoon)
-	MF	CHN	Wang Wei (loan return from Qingdao)
-	DF	CHN	Li Peng (loan return from Nantong Zhiyun)
-	FW	CHN	Zhou Junchen (loan return from Qingdao)
-	FW	CHN	Zhu Jianrong (loan return from Qingdao)
-	DF	CHN	Yang Zexiang (from Dalian Pro)
-	MF	CHN	Liu Ruofan (loan return from Tianjin Jinmen Tiger)
-	MF	CHN	Cong Zhen (loan return from Wuhan)
-	DF	CHN	Xu Yougang (loan return from Zhejiang Yiteng)
-	MF	CHN	Xu Haoyang (loan return from Beijing BSU)
-	MF	CHN	Sun Qinhan (loan return from Beijing BSU)
-	MF	CHN	Su Shihao (loan return from Inner Mongolia Zhongyou)
-	MF	CHN	Xu Lei (loan return from Inner Mongolia Zhongyou)

Out:

No.	Pos.	Nation	Player
6	DF	CHN	Feng Xiaoting (loan return to Guangzhou)
14	DF	CHN	Sun Kai (to Chongqing Liangjiang Athletic)
19	GK	CHN	Zeng Cheng (loan return to Guangzhou)
22	FW	ITA	Stephan El Shaarawy (to (Italy) Roma)
30	MF	CMR	Stéphane Mbia (to Wuhan)
31	MF	ECU	Miller Bolaños (loan to Chongqing Liangjiang Athletic)
34	MF	CHN	Lü Pin (loan to Zibo Cuju)
47	MF	CHN	Hai Xiaorui (to Suzhou Dongwu)
-	FW	CHN	Song Runtong (to Qingdao)
-	GK	CHN	Lin Kaiyuan (to Xinjiang Tianshan Leopard)
-	FW	NGA	Odion Ighalo (to (Saudi Arabia) Al Shabab)
-	FW	CHN	Gao Di (loan to Zhejiang)
-	DF	CHN	Jiang Shenglong (loan to Chongqing Liangjiang Athletic)
-	GK	CHN	Chen Zhao (to Chongqing Liangjiang Athletic)
-	MF	CHN	Wang Wei (to Qingdao)
-	DF	CHN	Li Peng (to Qingdao)
-	FW	CHN	Zhou Junchen (loan to Qingdao)
-	FW	CHN	Zhu Jianrong (loan to Qingdao)
-	DF	CHN	Yang Zexiang (loan to Chengdu Rongcheng)
-	MF	CHN	Liu Ruofan (loan to Chengdu Rongcheng)
-	MF	CHN	Cong Zhen (loan to Tianjin Jinmen Tiger)
-	DF	CHN	Xu Yougang (loan to Zibo Cuju)
-	MF	CHN	Xu Haoyang (loan to Wuhan Three Towns)
-	MF	CHN	Sun Qinhan (loan to Changchun Yatai)
-	MF	CHN	Su Shihao (loan to Meizhou Hakka)
-	MF	CHN	Xu Lei (loan to Meizhou Hakka)

=== Shenzhen ===
In:

No.	Pos.	Nation	Player
2	DF	CHN	Yeljan Shinar (loan return from Beijing BSU)
7	FW	GHA	Frank Acheampong (from Tianjin Jinmen Tiger)
10	MF	COL	Juan Fernando Quintero (from (Argentina) River Plate)
22	MF	GHA	Mubarak Wakaso (from Jiangsu)
26	DF	CHN	Yuan Mincheng (from Chongqing Liangjiang Athletic)
27	FW	BRA	Alan Kardec (from Chongqing Liangjiang Athletic)
30	MF	CHN	Huang Ruifeng (loan return from Changchun Yatai)
-	FW	CHN	Chen Xiangyu (from (Japan) FC Imabari)
-	DF	CHN	Wang Weilong (loan return from Liaoning Shenyang Urban)
-	MF	CHN	Shi Yiyi (loan return from Qingdao Jonoon)
-	MF	CHN	Wang Peng (loan return from Cangzhou Mighty Lions)
-	DF	CHN	Wang Dalong (loan return from Taizhou Yuanda)
-	MF	CHN	Xu Yue (loan return from Jiangxi Beidamen)
-	GK	CHN	Wei Jian (loan return from Nanjing City)
-	MF	CHN	Tan Binliang (loan return from Nanjing City)

Out:

No.	Pos.	Nation	Player
3	DF	CHN	Lü Haidong (loan to Wuhan Three Towns)
5	DF	KOR	Song Ju-hun (to (South Korea) Jeju United)
9	FW	COL	Harold Preciado (Released)
10	MF	NOR	Ole Selnæs (loan to Hebei)
12	FW	CMR	John Mary (loan to (Japan) Avispa Fukuoka)
17	MF	CHN	Liu Yue (loan to Wuhan Three Towns)
18	MF	CHN	Xu Yang (to Zibo Cuju)
19	FW	CGO	Thievy Bifouma (loan to Heilongjiang Ice City)
26	MF	CHN	Jin Qiang (loan to Hebei)
32	MF	CHN	Chen Fujun (to Nantong Zhiyun)
39	MF	CHN	Gan Chao (loan to Chengdu Rongcheng)
58	DF	CHN	Xiang Baixu (to Chengdu Rongcheng)
-	MF	CHN	Zu Pengchao (to Hebei)
-	MF	CHN	Wang Chengkuai (loan to Zibo Cuju)
-	FW	POR	Dyego Sousa (Released)
-	DF	CHN	Liao Lei (loan to Beijing BSU)
-	DF	CHN	Sun Xiaobin (to Zibo Cuju)
-	MF	CHN	Wang Peng (loan to Changchun Yatai)
-	DF	CHN	Wang Dalong (to Nanjing City)
-	MF	CHN	Xu Yue (loan to Wuhan Three Towns)
-	GK	CHN	Wei Jian (to Nanjing City)
-	MF	CHN	Tan Binliang (to Nanjing City)

=== Tianjin Jinmen Tiger ===
In:

No.	Pos.	Nation	Player
3	DF	CHN	Li Songyi (loan from Shandong Taishan)
7	MF	CHN	Zhou Tong (from Wuhan)
13	DF	CHN	Zhou Qiming (from Sichuan Minzu)
16	FW	CHN	Li Xiang (from Shaoxing Keqiao Yuejia)
17	FW	FRA	Jules Iloki (from Sichuan Jiuniu)
22	GK	CHN	Fang Jingqi (from Taizhou Yuanda)
29	FW	CHN	Ba Dun (loan from Beijing Guoan)
30	MF	CHN	Fan Xuyang (loan from Hubei Istar)
31	MF	CHN	Chen Kerui (loan from Shandong Taishan)
35	DF	CHN	Nie Tao (from Qinghai Oulu International)
37	MF	CHN	Yang Zihao (loan from Shanghai Port)
39	MF	CHN	Cong Zhen (loan from Shanghai Shenhua)
44	DF	HUN	Tamás Kádár (loan from Shandong Taishan)
-	MF	CHN	Liu Yaoxin (loan return from Beijing Renhe)

Out:

No.	Pos.	Nation	Player
1	GK	CHN	Du Jia (to Shanghai Port)
3	DF	CHN	Zhao Honglüe (to Wuhan)
4	DF	CHN	Lei Tenglong (Released)
7	FW	GHA	Frank Acheampong (to Shenzhen)
8	FW	CHN	Xiao Zhi (to Hebei Zhuoao)
9	FW	BRA	Sandro Lima (to (Turkey) Gençlerbirliği)
10	FW	BRA	Johnathan (to Chengdu Rongcheng)
13	DF	CHN	Zheng Kaimu (to Cangzhou Mighty Lions)
14	DF	CHN	Rong Hao (loan return to Guangzhou)
15	DF	GER	Felix Bastians (to (Belgium) Waasland-Beveren)
16	MF	CHN	Liu Ruofan (loan return to Shanghai Shenhua)
17	FW	CHN	Hui Jiakang (to Changchun Yatai)
22	MF	CHN	Guo Hao (to Cangzhou Mighty Lions)
25	MF	UZB	Odil Ahmedov (loan return to Shanghai Port)
30	DF	CHN	Liu Yang (to Cangzhou Mighty Lions)
60	DF	CHN	Jiang Shenglong (loan return to Shanghai Shenhua)

=== Wuhan ===
In:

No.	Pos.	Nation	Player
3	DF	CHN	Zhao Honglüe (from Tianjin Jinmen Tiger)
5	MF	CHN	Tian Yinong (from Jiangsu)
11	MF	CHN	Huang Zichang (from Jiangsu)
13	FW	CHN	Dong Xuesheng (from Hebei)
18	FW	CHN	Fang Hao (loan from Shandong Taishan)
19	MF	CHN	Keweser Xamixidin (loan from (Portugal) Gondomar)
21	MF	CHN	Li Yang (loan from (Portugal) Gondomar)
25	MF	CMR	Stéphane Mbia (from Shanghai Shenhua)
27	DF	CHN	Yang Boyu (from Jiangsu)
33	MF	CHN	Ye Chongqiu (from Jiangsu)
35	GK	CHN	Guo Jiawei (loan from Hubei Istar)
39	FW	FRA	Yoann Arquin (from Heilongjiang Ice City)
45	DF	CHN	Lin Guoyu (loan from Shandong Taishan)

Out:

No.	Pos.	Nation	Player
3	DF	CHN	Liu Yi (to Heilongjiang Ice City)
5	DF	CHN	Han Pengfei (loan to Guangzhou City)
11	MF	CHN	Zhou Tong (to Tianjin Jinmen Tiger)
19	FW	CHN	Hu Jinghang (loan return to Shanghai Port)
21	MF	CHN	Jiang Zilei (to Nantong Zhiyun)
23	GK	CHN	Sun Shoubo (Retired)
25	MF	FRA	Eddy Gnahoré (loan return to (France) Amiens)
27	MF	CHN	Tong Xiaoxing (Retired)
29	DF	CHN	Zhang Chenglin (loan return to Guangzhou)
31	FW	CHN	Dong Xuesheng (loan return to Hebei)
34	DF	CHN	Xia Ao (loan to Yanbian Longding)
39	MF	CHN	Cong Zhen (loan return to Shanghai Shenhua)
41	MF	CHN	Chen Ao (loan return to Hebei)
46	MF	CHN	Gao Ming (to Jiangxi Beidamen)

== League One ==
=== Beijing BIT ===
In:

No.	Pos.	Nation	Player
2	MF	CHN	Gong Hankui (loan from Chengdu Rongcheng)
7	MF	CHN	Tan Xiang (loan from Cangzhou Mighty Lions)
10	FW	CHN	Wang Zihao (loan from Cangzhou Mighty Lions)
17	DF	CHN	Huang Chao (from Suzhou Dongwu)
18	DF	CHN	Wang Chao (from Sichuan Jiuniu)
20	MF	CHN	Zhan Minwei (loan from Cangzhou Mighty Lions)
22	GK	CHN	Liu Tianxin (from Beijing BSU)
30	GK	CHN	Zhang Jin (from Jiangsu Yancheng Dingli)

Out:

No.	Pos.	Nation	Player
1	GK	CHN	Wang Wei (Retired)
7	FW	CHN	Li Sichen (Retired)
17	DF	CHN	Hu Ming (to Qingdao Jonoon)
18	DF	CHN	Wang Chao (loan return to Sichuan Jiuniu)

=== Beijing BSU ===
In:

No.	Pos.	Nation	Player
2	FW	CHN	Zhu Chaoqing (Free agent)
4	DF	CHN	Zong Keyi (from Hebei Zhuoao)
7	FW	CHN	Ji Shengpan (loan from Shandong Taishan)
8	MF	CHN	He Tongshuai (from Zibo Cuju)
9	FW	CHN	Tian Yuda (loan from Shandong Taishan)
15	MF	CHN	Liu Chao (from Hebei Zhuoao)
17	FW	CHN	Wen Da (loan from Beijing Guoan)
22	MF	CHN	Wang Haochen (from Hebei Zhuoao)
24	GK	CHN	Mai Gaoling (loan from Guangzhou)
31	DF	CHN	Liao Lei (loan from Shenzhen)
35	MF	CHN	Mu Jiaxin (from Beijing Guoan)
41	DF	CHN	Tong Feige (from Hebei Zhuoao)
-	MF	CHN	Song Yi (loan return from Hebei Zhuoao)
-	GK	CHN	Dong Hang (loan return from Hunan Billows)
-	FW	CHN	Yang Yun (loan return from Hebei Zhuoao)
-	FW	CHN	Han Yi (loan return from Hebei Zhuoao)

Out:

No.	Pos.	Nation	Player
4	DF	CHN	Yeljan Shinar (loan return to Shenzhen)
6	DF	CHN	Anizirjan Askar (loan return to Guangzhou)
8	FW	CHN	Li Ming (loan return to Guangzhou)
10	MF	CHN	Tang Shi (loan return to Guangzhou)
11	MF	CHN	Meng Zhen (loan return to Jiangsu)
14	DF	CHN	Zeng Yuming (loan return to Shandong Taishan)
18	MF	CHN	Xu Haoyang (loan return to Shanghai Shenhua)
22	GK	CHN	Liu Tianxin (to Beijing BIT)
25	GK	CHN	Jiang Hao (to Nanjing City)
30	MF	CHN	Sun Qinhan (loan return to Shanghai Shenhua)
-	FW	CHN	Yang Yun (to Kunshan)
-	FW	CHN	Han Yi (to Zibo Cuju)

=== Chengdu Rongcheng ===
In:

No.	Pos.	Nation	Player
1	GK	CHN	Zhang Yan (from Jiangsu)
3	DF	CHN	Tang Xin (from Guizhou)
4	DF	CHN	Yang Zexiang (loan from Shanghai Shenhua)
7	FW	BRA	Johnathan (from Tianjin Jinmen Tiger)
8	MF	CHN	Liu Ruofan (loan from Shanghai Shenhua)
10	MF	BRA	Rômulo (from (South Korea) Busan IPark)
12	MF	CHN	Li Zhi (from Suzhou Dongwu)
13	DF	CHN	Han Xuan (from Henan Songshan Longmen)
14	MF	CHN	Han Guanghui (from Shaanxi Chang'an Athletic)
18	DF	CHN	Xiang Baixu (from Shenzhen)
24	GK	CHN	Xing Yu (from Qingdao)
27	DF	CHN	Liu Bin (from Henan Songshan Longmen)
29	DF	CHN	Li Jianbin (from Dalian Pro)
30	MF	CHN	Liu Chaoyang (loan from Shandong Taishan)
33	MF	CHN	Jin Chengjun (from Beijing Renhe)
36	DF	CHN	Gou Junchen (from Suzhou Dongwu)
39	MF	CHN	Gan Chao (loan from Shenzhen)
-	DF	CHN	Sun Yunlong (from Ningxiaren Haixi)

Out:

No.	Pos.	Nation	Player
1	GK	CHN	Li Shi (loan to Hunan Billows)
2	MF	CHN	Gong Hankui (loan to Beijing BIT)
3	DF	CHN	He Yang (Released)
7	MF	CHN	Zhang Jingyang (loan to Sichuan Minzu)
9	FW	CHN	Wang Chaolong (loan to Xi'an Wolves)
10	FW	SRB	Nikola Đurđić (loan to Zhejiang)
14	FW	CHN	Cao Tianbao (to Sichuan Minzu)
32	FW	CHN	Ma Xiaolei (loan to Shaanxi Chang'an Athletic)
33	DF	CHN	Chu Jinzhao (to Nanjing City)
34	MF	CHN	Wang Xiaolong (to Hebei Zhuoao)
35	GK	CHN	Fang Zihong (loan to Quanzhou Yassin)
36	MF	CHN	Li Shanglin (loan to Shanxi Longjin)
-	DF	CHN	Xu Chenhao (loan to Shanxi Longjin)
-	MF	CHN	Wu Zhuangfei (loan to Sichuan Minzu)
-	FW	CHN	Cheng Zuhao (loan to Sichuan Minzu)

=== Guizhou ===
In:

No.	Pos.	Nation	Player
28	MF	CHN	Chen Qi (loan return from Hebei Zhuoao)
-	GK	CHN	Liu Chang (loan return from Qingdao Red Lions)

Out:

No.	Pos.	Nation	Player
2	DF	CHN	Tang Xin (to Chengdu Rongcheng)
9	FW	CHN	Gui Hong (loan return to Guangzhou City)
10	FW	CRO	Anton Maglica (to (Turkey) Kayserispor)
25	DF	CHN	Zhang Zhi (Retired)
34	MF	CHN	Gao Haisheng (loan return to Shanghai Port)
39	MF	CHN	Fan Yunlong (loan return to Guangzhou City)

=== Heilongjiang Ice City ===
In:

No.	Pos.	Nation	Player
2	DF	CHN	Zhao Chengle (from Zibo Cuju)
7	FW	CMR	Donovan Ewolo (from (Czech Republic) MFK Vyškov)
11	FW	CHN	Pan Chaoran (from Cangzhou Mighty Lions)
16	FW	CHN	Shao Shuai (from Beijing Renhe)
19	FW	CGO	Thievy Bifouma (loan from Shenzhen)
21	GK	CHN	Qi Yuxi (from Jiangsu)
26	MF	CHN	Chen Liming (from Beijing Renhe)
30	MF	CHN	Nizamdin Ependi (from Beijing Renhe)
32	DF	CHN	Liu Yi (from Wuhan)
38	MF	CHN	Li Chenglong (from Beijing Renhe)
42	GK	CHN	Yin Tianlong (from Guangzhou City)
-	FW	CHN	Lin Jinghao (from Beijing Renhe)
-	MF	CHN	Liu Xinyu (from Beijing Renhe)
-	DF	CHN	Li Shisen (from Beijing Renhe)
-	DF	CHN	Fu Jie (from Beijing Renhe)

Out:

No.	Pos.	Nation	Player
26	MF	CHN	Chen Liming (loan return to Beijing Renhe)
27	FW	CMR	Donovan Ewolo (loan return to (Czech Republic) MFK Vyškov)
30	GK	CHN	Liu Peng (loan return to Beijing Renhe)
32	DF	CHN	Mao Kaiyu (to Changchun Yatai)
33	FW	FRA	Yoann Arquin (to Wuhan)
39	FW	CMR	Raphaël Messi Bouli (to Liaoning Shenyang Urban)

=== Jiangxi Beidamen ===
In:

No.	Pos.	Nation	Player
2	MF	CHN	Li Qinghao (from Dalian Pro)
5	DF	CHN	Zhu Mingxin (loan from Changchun Yatai)
21	FW	CHN	Liu Wenjie (from Guangzhou City)
22	MF	BRA	Magno Cruz (from (Brazil) CRB)
23	DF	HKG	Andy Russell (loan from Hebei)
24	MF	CHN	Gao Ming (from Wuhan)
25	MF	CHN	Yang Siping (Free agent)
39	MF	CHN	Tang Qirun (from Shenzhen Bogang)

Out:

No.	Pos.	Nation	Player
2	DF	CHN	Zhu Mingxin (loan return to Changchun Yatai)
15	MF	CHN	Wang Pan (loan return to Meizhou Hakka)
22	DF	HKG	Andy Russell (loan return to Hebei)
24	GK	CHN	Mu Qianyu (to Xiamen Egret Island)
41	MF	CHN	Xu Yue (loan return to Shenzhen)

=== Kunshan ===
In:

No.	Pos.	Nation	Player
3	DF	CHN	Zhang Chenglin (loan from Guangzhou)
4	MF	CHN	Liu Boyang (from Beijing Renhe)
7	MF	CHN	Xiao Taotao (loan from Guangzhou)
15	MF	CHN	Zheng Bofan (loan from Dalian Pro)
16	FW	CHN	Yang Yun (from Beijing BSU)
19	FW	CHN	Feng Boyuan (from Jiangsu)
22	DF	CHN	Pan Yongzhu (from Taizhou Yuanda)
24	MF	CHN	Zhang Chen (from Shandong Taishan)
29	MF	CHN	Xu Junmin (from Nantong Zhiyun)
33	MF	CHN	Cai Mingmin (loan from Guangzhou)
-	MF	CHN	Liu Xinxiang (from Jiangsu)

Out:

No.	Pos.	Nation	Player
3	DF	CHN	Cao Haiqing (loan return to Jiangsu)
7	MF	CHN	Xiao Taotao (loan return to Guangzhou)
25	FW	NGA	Tunde Adeniji (to (Saudi Arabia) Al-Fayha)
32	MF	CHN	Xu Anbang (loan return to Shandong Taishan)

=== Liaoning Shenyang Urban ===
In:

No.	Pos.	Nation	Player
7	FW	CHN	Jin Hui (from Beijing Renhe)
12	GK	CHN	Dong Jianhong (from Kunming Zheng He Shipman)
13	DF	CHN	Duan Yu (from Jiangsu Yancheng Dingli)
18	MF	CHN	Liu Jiawei (from Shaanxi Warriors Beyond)
19	FW	CHN	Wang Jingbin (from Guangzhou)
24	DF	CHN	Du Junpeng (from Shaanxi Chang'an Athletic)
25	DF	CHN	Sun Fabo (from Shaanxi Chang'an Athletic)
29	FW	CHN	Men Yang (from Zibo Cuju)
30	MF	CHN	Zhang Wu (from Inner Mongolia Caoshangfei)
32	MF	CHN	Ma Jun (from Jiangsu Yancheng Dingli)
33	MF	CHN	Wang Congming (from Suzhou Dongwu)
34	FW	CHN	Wu Linfeng (from Hebei Zhuoao)
35	MF	CHN	Li Zhongting (Free agent)
-	MF	CHN	Li Diantong (Free agent)
-	FW	CMR	Raphaël Messi Bouli (from Heilongjiang Ice City)

Out:

No.	Pos.	Nation	Player
12	GK	CHN	Mou Pengfei (to Qingdao Jonoon)
19	FW	CHN	Wang Jingbin (loan return to Guangzhou)
20	DF	UZB	Islom Tukhtakhujaev (to (Uzbekistan) Qizilqum)
30	FW	CGO	Juvhel Tsoumou (to (Romania) Viitorul Constanța)
33	MF	CHN	Zhang Xingbo (to Chongqing Liangjiang Athletic)
-	DF	CHN	Wang Weilong (loan return to Shenzhen)
-	MF	CHN	Li Diantong (loan to Hebei Kungfu)
-	FW	CMR	Raphaël Messi Bouli (loan to Nanjing City)

=== Meizhou Hakka ===
In:

No.	Pos.	Nation	Player
2	DF	CHN	Wen Junjie (Free agent)
4	DF	HKG	Vas Nuñez (Free agent)
5	MF	CHN	Lu Lin (from Guangzhou City)
9	FW	BRA	Igor Sartori (from R&F (Hong Kong))
19	FW	CHN	Gui Hong (loan from Guangzhou City)
21	MF	CHN	Tang Shi (loan from Guangzhou)
31	MF	CHN	Su Shihao (loan from Shanghai Shenhua)
32	MF	CHN	Xu Lei (loan from Shanghai Shenhua)
33	DF	CHN	Liu Sheng (loan from Wuhan Three Towns)
-	FW	BRA	Dori (loan return from Sichuan Jiuniu)
-	MF	CHN	Wang Pan (loan return from Jiangxi Beidamen)

Out:

No.	Pos.	Nation	Player
5	DF	HKG	Leung Nok Hang (to Zhejiang)
28	MF	CHN	Yang Yilin (loan return to Shandong Taishan)
-	MF	CHN	Wang Pan (to Hebei Zhuoao)

=== Nanjing City ===
In:

No.	Pos.	Nation	Player
1	GK	CHN	Huang Zihao (from Jiangsu)
2	DF	CHN	Sun Ningzhe (from Hubei Istar)
3	DF	CHN	Chu Jinzhao (from Chengdu Rongcheng)
4	MF	CHN	Zhang Xinlin (from Taizhou Yuanda)
5	FW	CHN	Zhou Jiahao (from Zibo Cuju)
6	MF	CHN	Zhong Yi (Free agent)
9	FW	CHN	Ge Wei (from Taizhou Yuanda)
10	DF	CHN	Chen Fangzhou (from Inner Mongolia Zhongyou)
11	FW	CHN	Li Rui (from Guangxi Baoyun)
12	MF	CHN	Meng Zhen (from Jiangsu)
13	MF	CHN	Tan Binliang (from Shenzhen)
16	GK	CHN	Wei Jian (from Shenzhen)
17	DF	CHN	Mou Shantao (from Inner Mongolia Zhongyou)
18	MF	CHN	Xie Zhiwei (from Jiangsu)
19	FW	CHN	Hu Shuming (from Jiangsu)
20	MF	CHN	Abdusalam Wal (from Shaoxing Keqiao Yuejia)
21	GK	CHN	Zhang Jingyi (from Jiangsu)
22	DF	CHN	Wu Lei (loan from Shandong Taishan)
23	MF	CHN	Sun Enming (loan from Shanghai Port)
24	DF	CHN	Liang Jingbo (from Jiangsu)
25	GK	CHN	Jiang Hao (from Beijing BSU)
26	DF	CHN	Xu Jizu (loan from Zhejiang)
27	DF	CHN	Zheng Xuejian (from Jiangsu)
28	FW	CMR	Raphaël Messi Bouli (loan from Liaoning Shenyang Urban)
30	MF	CHN	Zhao Mingyu (loan from Changchun Yatai)
31	DF	CHN	Wang Dalong (from Shenzhen)
33	DF	CHN	Cao Haiqing (from Jiangsu)
34	MF	CHN	Li Jiawei (from Jiangsu)
36	MF	CHN	Wang Xiaole (from Qinghai Oulu International)
37	MF	CHN	Li Liangliang (from Jiangsu)
38	MF	CHN	Zou Li (from Jiangsu)
39	DF	CHN	Wang Jie (Free agent)

Out:

No.	Pos.	Nation	Player
1	GK	CHN	Wei Jian (loan return to Shenzhen)
12	DF	CHN	Shang Kefeng (loan return to Jiangsu)
16	FW	CHN	Xu Chunqing (loan return to Jiangsu)
22	GK	CHN	Yang Fan (loan to Wuxi Wugou)
31	MF	CHN	Tan Binliang (loan return to Shenzhen)
42	MF	CHN	Huang Cong (loan return to Nantong Zhiyun)
56	MF	CHN	Li Liangliang (loan return to Jiangsu)

=== Nantong Zhiyun ===
In:

No.	Pos.	Nation	Player
3	DF	CHN	Zhang Tianlong (from Taizhou Yuanda)
4	DF	HKG	Li Ngai Hoi (from Kitchee)
5	DF	CHN	Ma Sheng (from Hebei Zhuoao)
6	MF	CHN	Yang Mingyang (from (Switzerland) Grasshopper)
7	MF	CHN	Jiang Zilei (from Wuhan)
9	MF	CHN	Chen Fujun (from Shenzhen)
11	FW	GNB	Zé Turbo (from (Switzerland) Grasshopper)
18	MF	CHN	Tao Hongliang (from Taizhou Yuanda)
20	MF	CHN	Huang Cong (loan return from Nanjing City)
21	GK	CHN	Wu Yaoshengxuan (from Shaoxing Keqiao Yuejia)
22	MF	CHN	David Wang (from (England) Wolverhampton Wanderers)
23	GK	CHN	Shi Xiaodong (from Shanghai Port)
26	DF	CHN	Yao Ben (from Jiangsu)
27	DF	CHN	Qiu Zhongyi (from (Argentina) Argentinos Juniors)
31	DF	CHN	Xie Xiaofan (from Jiangsu)
37	MF	CHN	Gao Dalun (from Jiangsu)

Out:

No.	Pos.	Nation	Player
3	DF	CHN	Wei Lai (loan return to Shanghai Port)
4	DF	CHN	Li Jiawei (to Suzhou Dongwu)
5	DF	CHN	Li Peng (loan return to Shanghai Shenhua)
7	MF	CHN	Zhang Huachen (loan return to Shanghai Port)
9	FW	POR	João Silva (to Zibo Cuju)
10	MF	CHN	Xu Junmin (to Kunshan)
12	GK	CHN	Li Ya'nan (to Suzhou Dongwu)
18	FW	SRB	Mladen Kovačević (to (Serbia) Radnički Niš)
19	FW	CHN	Gao Zhijie (to Shaanxi Warriors Beyond)
23	GK	CHN	Shi Xiaodong (loan return to Shanghai Port)
27	MF	CHN	David Wang (loan return to (England) Wolverhampton Wanderers)
32	FW	CHN	Nan Yunqi (to Zibo Cuju)
39	DF	CHN	Wang Yongxin (to Suzhou Dongwu)
-	FW	CHN	Qian Changjie (to Suzhou Dongwu)

=== Shaanxi Chang'an Athletic ===
In:

No.	Pos.	Nation	Player
6	MF	CHN	Ding Jie (loan from Chongqing Liangjiang Athletic)
12	FW	CHN	Du Changjie (from Henan Songshan Longmen)
17	DF	CHN	Li Hong (from Kunming Zheng He Shipman)
20	MF	CHN	Su Shun (from Hebei Zhuoao)
25	GK	CHN	Li Chen (from Beijing Renhe)
26	FW	CHN	Ma Junliang (from Guangzhou City)
28	FW	CHN	Yu Shuai (from Inner Mongolia Zhongyou)
32	FW	CHN	Ma Xiaolei (loan from Chengdu Rongcheng)
33	MF	CHN	Xu Zhaoji (from Suzhou Dongwu)

Out:

No.	Pos.	Nation	Player
6	DF	ALB	Albi Alla (loan to Zibo Cuju)
12	MF	CHN	Han Guanghui (to Chengdu Rongcheng)
14	DF	CHN	Wei Renjie (loan to Zibo Cuju)
20	FW	CHN	Zhang Shuang (loan to Xi'an Wolves)
24	DF	CHN	Du Junpeng (to Liaoning Shenyang Urban)
25	DF	CHN	Sun Fabo (to Liaoning Shenyang Urban)
26	FW	CHN	Mai Sijing (to Zibo Cuju)
28	FW	CHN	Li Yingjian (to Zibo Cuju)

=== Sichuan Jiuniu ===
In:

No.	Pos.	Nation	Player
20	MF	CHN	Zheng Shengxiong (loan from Guangzhou)
21	MF	CHN	Nan Song (Free agent)
41	MF	CHN	Nuali Zimin (loan return from Zhejiang Yiteng)
-	DF	CHN	Liu Sheng (loan return from Inner Mongolia Caoshangfei)
-	DF	CHN	Ötkür Hesen (loan return from Shaanxi Warriors Beyond)
-	FW	FRA	Jules Iloki (loan return from Suzhou Dongwu)
-	DF	CHN	Wang Chao (loan return from Beijing BIT)

Out:

No.	Pos.	Nation	Player
21	FW	BRA	Dori (loan return to Meizhou Hakka)
30	MF	CHN	Cao Yiyao (to Sichuan Minzu)
41	MF	CHN	Zheng Shengxiong (loan return to Guangzhou)
-	DF	CHN	Ötkür Hesen (loan to Zibo Cuju)
-	FW	FRA	Jules Iloki (to Tianjin Jinmen Tiger)
-	DF	CHN	Wang Chao (to Beijing BIT)

=== Suzhou Dongwu ===
In:

No.	Pos.	Nation	Player
1	GK	CHN	Sun Le (from Shanghai Port)
2	DF	CHN	Li Jiawei (from Nantong Zhiyun)
3	DF	CHN	Guo Jing (loan from Guangzhou)
7	FW	CHN	Afrden Asqer (from Guangzhou)
8	MF	CHN	Deng Yubiao (loan from Guangzhou)
12	GK	CHN	Li Ya'nan (from Nantong Zhiyun)
14	DF	CHN	Xia Xicheng (from Jinan Xingzhou)
15	MF	CHN	Hu Haoyue (from Beijing Renhe)
16	DF	CHN	Li Shizhou (from Taizhou Yuanda)
17	DF	CHN	Yang Zhaohui (loan from Guangzhou)
18	DF	CHN	Zhang Cheng (from Jiangsu)
19	DF	CHN	Li Xiaoming (from Changchun Yatai)
23	MF	CHN	Hai Xiaorui (from Shanghai Shenhua)
24	MF	CHN	Zhang Lingfeng (from Jiangsu)
26	DF	CHN	Zheng Haokun (from Hebei)
27	MF	CHN	Fan Xiaodong (from Changchun Yatai)
28	FW	CHN	Li Haowen (from Shanghai Port)
31	FW	CHN	Qian Changjie (from Nantong Zhiyun)
32	DF	CHN	Cao Dong (loan from Chongqing Liangjiang Athletic)
33	DF	CHN	Shi Zhe (from Qingdao)
34	FW	CHN	Huang Lei (loan from Chongqing Liangjiang Athletic)
39	DF	CHN	Wang Yongxin (from Nantong Zhiyun)
40	GK	CHN	Sun Jiazheng (from Shanghai Port)

Out:

No.	Pos.	Nation	Player
9	FW	NGA	Haruna Garba (to (Romania) Voluntari)
10	MF	CHN	Chen Zhongliu (to Cangzhou Mighty Lions)
15	MF	CHN	Wang Congming (to Liaoning Shenyang Urban)
16	MF	CHN	Li Zhi (to Chengdu Rongcheng)
18	FW	CHN	Wu Linfeng (loan return to Hebei Zhuoao)
19	FW	NGA	Chris Shimbayev (loan return to (Nigeria) Galaxy Sports Academy)
22	GK	CHN	Yuan Weihao (to Inner Mongolia Caoshangfei)
23	MF	CHN	Xu Zhaoji (to Shaanxi Chang'an Athletic)
26	DF	CHN	Gou Junchen (to Chengdu Rongcheng)
28	FW	CHN	Li Haowen (loan return to Shanghai Port)
29	FW	NGA	Joseph Atule Junior (loan return to (Nigeria) Galaxy Sports Academy)
30	DF	CHN	Zhang Linguang (to Shaanxi Warriors Beyond)
33	GK	CHN	Zhao Yang (to Zibo Cuju)
36	MF	CHN	Hu Xingyu (loan return to Chongqing Liangjiang Athletic)
37	FW	CHN	Huang Lei (loan return to Chongqing Liangjiang Athletic)
38	FW	FRA	Jules Iloki (loan return to Sichuan Jiuniu)
39	DF	CHN	Li Xiaoming (loan return to Changchun Yatai)
-	DF	CHN	Huang Chao (to Beijing BIT)

=== Wuhan Three Towns ===
In:

No.	Pos.	Nation	Player
3	MF	CHN	Xu Qing (from Inner Mongolia Zhongyou)
4	DF	TPE	Yaki Yen (from Qingdao)
7	FW	BRA	Ademilson (Free agent)
12	MF	CHN	Zhang Xiaobin (from Jiangsu)
14	DF	CHN	Rong Hao (from Guangzhou)
16	MF	CHN	Yang Kuo (from Henan Songshan Longmen)
17	MF	CHN	Liu Yue (loan from Shenzhen)
19	DF	CHN	Zhang Wentao (loan from Henan Songshan Longmen)
20	FW	NGA	Moses Ogbu (from (Sweden) Mjällby AIF)
21	GK	CHN	Geng Xiaofeng (loan from Hebei)
23	DF	CHN	Ren Hang (loan from Hebei)
30	MF	CHN	Xu Yue (loan from Shenzhen)
31	MF	CHN	Luo Senwen (loan from Hebei)
32	DF	CHN	Lü Haidong (loan from Shenzhen)
34	DF	BRA	Jadson (loan from (Portugal) Portimonense)
36	DF	CHN	Zhao Shuhao (from Hebei Zhuoao)
37	MF	CHN	Xu Haoyang (loan from Shanghai Shenhua)
38	MF	CHN	Caysar Adiljan (from Hubei Istar)
42	DF	CHN	Liu Yiming (loan from Guangzhou)

Out:

No.	Pos.	Nation	Player
16	MF	CHN	Wang Hanbing (to Hebei Kungfu)
25	FW	CHN	Wu Yizhen (loan return to Shanghai Shenhua)
28	DF	CHN	Luan Haodong (loan return to Hebei)
30	DF	CHN	Liu Sheng (loan to Meizhou Hakka)
43	MF	CHN	Chen Yunhua (loan return to Hebei)
56	MF	CHN	Zhang Hui (loan return to Hebei)
58	DF	CHN	Gong Qiule (loan return to Hebei)

=== Xinjiang Tianshan Leopard ===
In:

No.	Pos.	Nation	Player
2	DF	CHN	Wu Hang (from Shanghai Port)
4	DF	CHN	Zheng Yiming (loan from Beijing Guoan)
8	MF	CHN	Xirzat Helil (from Chongqing Liangjiang Athletic)
9	MF	CHN	Zhuang Jiajie (from Zibo Cuju)
10	FW	CHN	Shi Jian (from Shanghai Port)
12	DF	CHN	Ma Chao (from Jiangsu Yancheng Dingli)
17	MF	CHN	Huang Wenzhuo (from Shanghai Port)
18	MF	CHN	Li Jingrun (from Beijing Guoan)
20	GK	CHN	Lin Kaiyuan (from Shanghai Shenhua)
32	GK	CHN	Huang Yuandong (from Qinghai Oulu International)
—	MF	CHN	Nurmemet Sherip (free agent)

Out:

No.	Pos.	Nation	Player
2	DF	CHN	Nurmemet Tursun (to Hebei Zhuoao)
7	FW	NGA	Kingsley Onuegbu (loan return to Shaanxi Chang'an Athletic)
10	MF	CHN	Sabit Abdusalam (to Cangzhou Mighty Lions)
12	GK	CHN	Gu Junjie (to Zibo Cuju)
25	FW	BDI	Bienvenue Kanakimana (loan return to (Czech Republic) MFK Vyškov)
28	MF	CHN	Wang Haozhi (to Hebei Zhuoao)

=== Zhejiang ===
In:

No.	Pos.	Nation	Player
1	GK	CHN	Gu Chao (from Jiangsu)
2	DF	HKG	Leung Nok Hang (from Meizhou Hakka)
9	FW	CHN	Gao Di (loan from Shanghai Shenhua)
16	MF	CHN	Yao Junsheng (from Shandong Taishan)
37	MF	CHN	Eysajan Kurban (from Guangzhou)
40	FW	SRB	Nikola Đurđić (loan from Chengdu Rongcheng)

Out:

No.	Pos.	Nation	Player
2	MF	CHN	Wang Guanyi (Retired)
7	FW	BRA	Rafael Martins (to (Portugal) Moreirense)
13	MF	CHN	Yao Junsheng (loan return to Shandong Taishan)
14	MF	CHN	Feng Gang (loan return to Hebei)
39	DF	CHN	Xu Jizu (loan to Nanjing City)

=== Zibo Cuju ===
In:

No.	Pos.	Nation	Player
1	GK	CHN	Dong Yifan (from Changchun Yatai)
2	DF	CHN	Wu Haoran (from Cangzhou Mighty Lions)
3	DF	CHN	Liu Junpeng (from Taizhou Yuanda)
4	DF	CHN	Zhang Hongjiang (Free agent)
5	DF	CHN	Ötkür Hesen (loan from Sichuan Jiuniu)
6	DF	ALB	Albi Alla (loan from Shaanxi Chang'an Athletic)
7	MF	CHN	Li Benjian (Free agent)
8	MF	CHN	Chen Zitong (from Cangzhou Mighty Lions)
9	FW	CHN	Nan Yunqi (from Nantong Zhiyun)
10	FW	CHN	He Shihua (from Sichuan Minzu)
11	MF	CHN	Sun Weizhe (from Beijing Renhe)
12	GK	CHN	Gu Junjie (from Xinjiang Tianshan Leopard)
13	DF	CHN	Liu Chun (from Sichuan Minzu)
14	DF	CHN	Wei Renjie (loan from Shaanxi Chang'an Athletic)
16	FW	CHN	Han Yi (from Beijing BSU)
17	FW	CHN	Liu Ziming (loan from Cangzhou Mighty Lions)
18	MF	CHN	Xu Yang (from Shenzhen)
19	FW	CHN	Yan Yiming (from Taizhou Yuanda)
20	DF	CHN	Cheng Rui (from Qingdao)
22	MF	CHN	Yu Zeping (from Sichuan Minzu)
23	MF	CHN	Wang Chengkuai (loan from Shenzhen)
25	DF	CHN	Li Chenguang (from Inner Mongolia Zhongyou)
26	FW	CHN	Mai Sijing (from Shaanxi Chang'an Athletic)
27	MF	CHN	Yang Zong (from Sichuan Minzu)
28	FW	CHN	Li Yingjian (from Shaanxi Chang'an Athletic)
29	DF	CHN	Wang Yiming (from Shaanxi Warriors Beyond)
33	MF	CHN	Jiang Yu (from Chongqing Liangjiang Athletic)
34	MF	CHN	Lü Pin (loan from Shanghai Shenhua)
35	DF	CHN	Sun Xiaobin (from Shenzhen)
36	DF	CHN	Xu Yougang (loan from Shanghai Shenhua)
39	FW	POR	João Silva (from Nantong Zhiyun)
45	MF	CHN	Liu Heng (from Henan Songshan Longmen)
-	GK	CHN	Zhao Yang (from Suzhou Dongwu)
-	DF	CHN	Lu Yao (from Henan Songshan Longmen)

Out:

No.	Pos.	Nation	Player
4	DF	CHN	Zhao Chengle (to Heilongjiang Ice City)
6	FW	CHN	Gao Fei (to Qingdao Jonoon)
7	MF	CHN	Li Zhongyi (to Inner Mongolia Caoshangfei)
9	FW	CHN	Men Yang (to Liaoning Shenyang Urban)
10	MF	CHN	Zhuang Jiajie (to Xinjiang Tianshan Leopard)
17	MF	CHN	Cao Sheng (loan return to Shandong Taishan)
18	FW	CHN	Zhou Jiahao (to Nanjing City)
19	DF	CHN	Zhang Fengyu (to Qingdao Jonoon)
23	MF	CHN	Sun Enming (loan return to Shanghai Port)
24	MF	CHN	Xu Li'ao (to Xi'an Wolves)
25	DF	CHN	Wang Boren (to Qingdao Jonoon)
29	DF	CHN	Du Yuxin (to Hebei Zhuoao)
41	FW	CHN	Ji Shengpan (loan return to Shandong Taishan)
50	MF	CHN	Jia Feifan (loan return to Shandong Taishan)
52	FW	CHN	Xie Wenneng (loan return to Shandong Taishan)
55	MF	CHN	Xie Wenxi (loan return to Shandong Taishan)
56	MF	CHN	Liu Changqi (to Shandong Taishan)
59	MF	CHN	He Tongshuai (to Beijing BSU)
60	MF	CHN	Sun Yi (to Shaanxi Warriors Beyond)
