= Liu Wenjie =

Liu Wenjie may refer to:

- Liu Wenjie (government official)
- Liu Wenjie (footballer)
