= Zhongyi (name) =

Zhongyi is the Mandarin Pinyin spelling of a Chinese given name.

People with this name include:

== People ==
- Ban Zhongyi, a Chinese director
- Chen Zhongyi, a Chinese civil engineer, engineering academic, and politician
- Hong Zhongyi (洪忠义), a Chinese actor
- Li Zhongyi (disambiguation), multiple people
- Liu Zhongyi (1930 – 2020), a Chinese politician
- Qian Chu (929 – 988), the posthumous name King Zhongyi (忠懿王), the last king of Wuyue
- Qiu Zhongyi (born 1996), a Chinese footballer
- Ren Zhongyi (1914 – 2005), a Chinese politician
- Tan Zhongyi (born 1991), a Chinese chess player
- Wan Sha Lang (1949 – 2023), known as Wang Zhongyi (王忠義), a Taiwanese singer and film actor
- Betty Loh Ti
- Yuan Zhongyi (born 1932) is a Chinese archaeologist

== Fictional characters ==
- Chang Zhongyi (常忠义), a character in the Chinese television series The Rise of Phoenixes
- Chia Zhongyi, a character in the Singaporean-Malaysian film Deleted
