= Liao Lei =

Liao Lei may refer to:

- Liao Lei (general) (1890-1939), Chinese general
- Liao Lei (footballer) (born 1999), Chinese footballer
