= Gaoming (disambiguation) =

Gaoming is a district of Foshan in Guangdong Province, China.

Gaoming or Gao Ming may also refer to:

- Gaoming, Anhua, a township in Hunan Province
- Gaoming Prison, a prison in Gaoming District
- Gao Ming (1305–1370), Chinese poet and playwright
- Gao Ming (footballer, born 1982), Chinese association football player
- Gao Ming (footballer, born 1998), Chinese association football player
