= Huang Cong =

Huang Cong may refer to:

- Huang Cong (footballer, born 1997) (黄聪), Chinese association footballer
- Huang Cong (footballer, born 2000) (黄聪), Chinese association footballer
