= Li Zhongyi =

Li Zhongyi may refer to:

- Li Zhongyi (swimmer)
- Li Zhongyi (footballer)
