= Du Jia =

Chinese footballer

Du Jia 杜佳
Personal information
- Full name: Du Jia
- Date of birth: 1 May 1993 (age 33)
- Place of birth: Tianjin, China
- Height: 1.85 m (6 ft 1 in)
- Position: Goalkeeper

Team information
- Current team: Jiangxi Dingnan United
- Number: 1

Senior career*
Years	Team	Apps	(Gls)
2014–2020	Tianjin TEDA	95	(0)
2021–2025	Shanghai Port	1	(0)
2026–	Jiangxi Dingnan United	0	(0)

International career^{‡}
2016	China U-23	2	(0)
- * Club domestic league appearances and goals as of 31 January 2023 ‡ National team caps and goals as of 14 June 2016

Du Jia (Chinese: 杜佳; born 1 May 1993 in Tianjin) is a Chinese professional football player who currently plays for China League One side Jiangxi Dingnan United.

== Club career ==
In 2014, Du Jia started his professional footballer career with Tianjin TEDA in the Chinese Super League. On 8 March 2015, he made his Super League debut in the season's first match which Tianjin Teda lost to Henan Jianye 3–1. He would go on to establish himself as the clubs first choice goalkeeper throughout the season.

On 12 March 2021, Du joined fellow top-tier club Shanghai Port for the start of the 2021 Chinese Super League campaign. He would make his debut for them in a league game on 31 December 2022 against Changchun Yatai in a 4–0 victory, where he came on as a substitute for Yan Junling.

On 7 February 2026, Du transferred to China League One side Jiangxi Dingnan United.

== Career statistics ==
Statistics accurate as of match played 31 January 2023

Appearances and goals by club, season and competition
Club	Season	League			National Cup		Continental		Other		Total	
Club	Season	Division	Apps	Goals	Apps	Goals	Apps	Goals	Apps	Goals	Apps	Goals
Tianjin TEDA	2014	Chinese Super League	0	0	0	0	-		-		0	0
Tianjin TEDA	2015	Chinese Super League	20	0	0	0	-		-		20	0
Tianjin TEDA	2016	Chinese Super League	0	0	0	0	-		-		0	0
Tianjin TEDA	2017	Chinese Super League	19	0	1	0	-		-		20	0
Tianjin TEDA	2018	Chinese Super League	26	0	0	0	-		-		26	0
Tianjin TEDA	2019	Chinese Super League	24	0	0	0	-		-		24	0
Tianjin TEDA	2020	Chinese Super League	6	0	1	0	-		-		7	0
Tianjin TEDA	Total		95	0	2	0	0	0	0	0	97	0
Shanghai Port	2021	Chinese Super League	0	0	0	0	0	0	-		0	0
Shanghai Port	2022	Chinese Super League	1	0	0	0	-		-		1	0
Shanghai Port	Total		1	0	0	0	0	0	0	0	1	0
Career total			96	0	2	0	0	0	0	0	98	0

== Honours ==
Shanghai Port

- Chinese Super League: 2023, 2024, 2025
- Chinese FA Cup: 2024
