= Liu Wenjie (government official) =

Chinese official (born 1944)

Liu Wenjie (born 1944) is a Chinese official who has been the Deputy Chairman of the China Council for the Promotion of International Trade since 1998.
