= Shi Jian (footballer) =

Chinese association football player

Personal information
- Date of birth: 16 July 1999 (age 27)
- Place of birth: Shanghai, China
- Height: 1.88 m (6 ft 2 in)
- Position: Forward

Team information
- Current team: Xinjiang Tianshan Leopard
- Number: 10

Youth career
- –2021: Shanghai Port

Senior career*
Years	Team	Apps	(Gls)
2021–2023	Xinjiang Tianshan Leopard	15	(2)
2023–	Qingdao West Coast	0	(0)
- * Club domestic league appearances and goals as of 14:01, 9 August 2021 (UTC)

Shi Jian (Chinese: 时间; born 16 July 1999) is a Chinese footballer currently playing as a forward for Qingdao West Coast.

On 10 September 2024, Chinese Football Association announced that Shi was banned from football-related activities for five years, from 10 September 2024 to 9 September 2029, for involving in match-fixing.

== Career statistics ==
=== Club ===
As of 9 August 2021.

Club	Season	League			Cup		Other		Total	
Club	Season	Division	Apps	Goals	Apps	Goals	Apps	Goals	Apps	Goals
Xinjiang Tianshan Leopard	2021	China League One	15	2	0	0	0	0	15	2
Career total			15	2	0	0	0	0	15	2
