= Li Qinghao =

Chinese association football player

Personal information
- Date of birth: 2 June 1999 (age 27)
- Place of birth: China
- Height: 1.72 m (5 ft 8 in)
- Position: Left-back

Team information
- Current team: Jiangxi Beidamen
- Number: 30

Youth career
- –2018: Tianjin Tianhai
- 2019–2021: Dalian Pro

Senior career*
Years	Team	Apps	(Gls)
2021–	Jiangxi Beidamen	12	(0)
- * Club domestic league appearances and goals as of 14:01, 31 January 2023 (UTC)

Li Qinghao (Chinese: 李庆毫; born 2 June 1999) is a Chinese footballer currently playing as a left-back for Jiangxi Beidamen.

== Career statistics ==
=== Club ===
As of 31 January 2023.

Appearances and goals by club, season and competition
Club	Season	League			National Cup		Continental		Other		Total	
Club	Season	Division	Apps	Goals	Apps	Goals	Apps	Goals	Apps	Goals	Apps	Goals
Jiangxi Beidamen	2021	China League One	7	0	1	0	-		-		8	0
Jiangxi Beidamen	2022	China League One	5	0	2	0	-		-		7	0
Jiangxi Beidamen	2023	China League One	0	0	0	0	-		-		0	0
Jiangxi Beidamen	Total		12	0	3	0	0	0	0	0	15	0
Career total			12	0	3	0	0	0	0	0	15	0
