= Du Changjie =

Chinese footballer

Du Changjie 杜长杰
Personal information
- Full name: Du Changjie
- Date of birth: 20 December 1997 (age 28)
- Place of birth: Zhengzhou, Henan, China
- Height: 1.79 m (5 ft 10 1/2 in)
- Positions: Forward; right winger

Team information
- Current team: Henan FC
- Number: 28

Youth career
- 2010–2014: Henan Jianye

Senior career*
Years	Team	Apps	(Gls)
2015–2020	Henan Jianye	70	(1)
2021–2022	Shaanxi Chang'an Athletic	36	(2)
2023	Yunnan Yukun	3	(0)
2023	Shanghai Jiading Huilong	14	(1)
2024	Xi'an Chongde Ronghai	7	(0)
2025	Shanghai Jiading Huilong	28	(0)
2026–	Henan FC	1	(0)
- * Club domestic league appearances and goals as of 22 November 2026

Du Changjie (simplified Chinese: 杜长杰; traditional Chinese: 杜長傑; pinyin: Dù Chángjié; born 20 December 1997) is a Chinese footballer who currently plays for Henan FC in the Chinese Super League.

== Club career ==
Du Changjie joined Henan Jianye's U-15 academy in 2010. In April 2014, he made a brief trial with Bundesliga side Eintracht Frankfurt after his impressive performance at Henan Jianye. He was promoted to Henan Jianye's first team squad in the 2015 season. He made his senior debut on 23 April 2017, in a 1–0 away defeat against Changchun Yatai, coming on as a substitute for Liu Heng in the 84th minute.

== Career statistics ==
As of 31 December 2025.

Appearances and goals by club, season and competition
Club	Season	League			National Cup		Continental		Other		Total	
Club	Season	Division	Apps	Goals	Apps	Goals	Apps	Goals	Apps	Goals	Apps	Goals
Henan Jianye	2015	Chinese Super League	0	0	0	0	-		-		0	0
Henan Jianye	2017	Chinese Super League	19	0	2	0	-		-		21	0
Henan Jianye	2018	Chinese Super League	13	1	1	1	-		-		14	2
Henan Jianye	2019	Chinese Super League	27	0	1	0	-		-		28	0
Henan Jianye	2020	Chinese Super League	11	0	1	0	-		-		12	0
Henan Jianye	Total		70	1	5	1	0	0	0	0	75	2
Shaanxi Chang'an Athletic	2021	China League One	27	2	1	0	-		-		28	2
Shaanxi Chang'an Athletic	2022	China League One	9	0	0	0	-		-		9	0
Shaanxi Chang'an Athletic	Total		36	2	1	0	0	0	0	0	37	2
Yunnan Yukun	2023	China League Two	3	0	1	0	-		-		4	0
Shanghai Jiading Huilong	2023	China League One	14	1	0	0	-		-		14	1
Xi'an Chongde Ronghai	2024	China League Two	7	0	1	0	-		-		8	0
Shanghai Jiading Huilong	2025	China League One	28	0	0	0	-		-		28	0
Career total			158	4	8	1	0	0	0	0	166	5
