= Huang Wenzhuo =

Chinese association football player

Personal information
- Date of birth: 9 January 1999 (age 27)
- Height: 1.74 m (5 ft 9 in)
- Position: Midfielder

Team information
- Current team: Xinjiang Tianshan Leopard
- Number: 17

Youth career
- –2021: Shanghai Port

Senior career*
Years	Team	Apps	(Gls)
2021–2023	Xinjiang Tianshan Leopard	7	(0)
2023–2024	Guangzhou E-Power	0	(0)
2025–	Changchun Xidu	0	(0)
- * Club domestic league appearances and goals as of 14:01, 9 August 2021 (UTC)

Huang Wenzhuo (Chinese: 黄文卓; born 9 January 1999) is a Chinese footballer currently playing as a midfielder for Changchun Xidu.

== Career statistics ==
=== Club ===
As of 17 August 2021.

Club	Season	League			Cup		Other		Total	
Club	Season	Division	Apps	Goals	Apps	Goals	Apps	Goals	Apps	Goals
Xinjiang Tianshan Leopard	2021	China League One	7	0	0	0	0	0	7	0
Career total			7	0	0	0	0	0	7	0
