= Chen Yunhua =

Chinese footballer

Personal information
- Full name: Chen Yunhua
- Date of birth: 14 September 1999 (age 27)
- Place of birth: Beijing, China
- Height: 1.80 m (5 ft 11 in)
- Position: Midfielder

Team information
- Current team: Jiangxi Lushan
- Number: 16

Youth career
- Beijing Enterprises Group
- Beijing Guoan
- Hebei China Fortune

Senior career*
| Years | Team | Apps | (Gls) |
| 2018 | Grulla Morioka | 1 | (0) |
| 2019–2023 | Hebei China Fortune | 24 | (1) |
| 2020 | → Wuhan Three Towns (loan) | 10 | (0) |
| 2023 | Guangxi Pingguo Haliao | 3 | (0) |
| 2023–2024 | Jiangxi Lushan | 14 | (0) |
| 2024–2025 | Guangxi Pingguo Haliao | 5 | (0) |
| 2024 | → Jiangxi Lushan (loan) | 15 | (0) |
| 2025 | → Jiangxi Lushan (loan) | 21 | (1) |
| 2026– | Jiangxi Lushan | 0 | (0) |
- * Club domestic league appearances and goals as of 8 March 2026

Chen Yunhua (Chinese: 陈运华; born 14 September 1999) is a Chinese football player who currently plays for Jiangxi Lushan in the China League Two.

== Playing career ==
Chen Yunhua would play for the Hebei China Fortune youth team before he joined Japanese J3 League club Grulla Morioka on 28 March 2018. He would make his debut on 11 November 2018 in a league game against YSCC Yokohama that ended in a 3-2 victory. At the end of the season he returned to Hebei who loaned him out to third tier football club Wuhan Three Towns in the 2020 China League Two season. At his time in Wuhan he would go on to aid them in winning the division title and promotion into the second tier.

== Career statistics ==
As of 21 October 2023.

| Club | Season | League | | | National Cup | | Continental | | Other | | Total | |
| Club | Season | Division | Apps | Goals | Apps | Goals | Apps | Goals | Apps | Goals | Apps | Goals |
|---|---|---|---|---|---|---|---|---|---|---|---|---|
| Grulla Morioka | 2018 | J3 League | 1 | 0 | 0 | 0 | – | | - | | 1 | 0 |
| Hebei China Fortune | 2021 | Chinese Super League | 5 | 0 | 1 | 0 | – | | - | | 6 | 0 |
| Hebei China Fortune | 2022 | Chinese Super League | 19 | 1 | 1 | 0 | – | | - | | 20 | 1 |
| Hebei China Fortune | Total | | 24 | 1 | 2 | 0 | 0 | 0 | 0 | 0 | 26 | 1 |
| Wuhan Three Towns (loan) | 2020 | China League Two | 10 | 0 | – | | – | | - | | 10 | 0 |
| Guangxi Pingguo Haliao | 2023 | China League One | 3 | 0 | 1 | 0 | – | | - | | 4 | 0 |
| Jiangxi Lushan | 2023 | China League One | 14 | 0 | 0 | 0 | – | | - | | 14 | 0 |
| Career total | | | 52 | 1 | 3 | 0 | 0 | 0 | 0 | 0 | 55 | 1 |

== Honours ==
=== Club ===
Wuhan Three Towns

- China League Two: 2020
