= Gong Qiule =

Chinese association football player

Personal information
- Date of birth: 27 July 1999 (age 27)
- Height: 1.71 m (5 ft 7 in)
- Position: Full-back

Team information
- Current team: Foshan Nanshi
- Number: 6

Senior career*
Years	Team	Apps	(Gls)
2019–2021	Hebei FC	5	(1)
2020	→ Wuhan Three Towns (loan)	3	(0)
2022	Kunshan FC	16	(0)
2023-2024	Foshan Nanshi	16	(0)

International career^{‡}
2018	China U19	2	(0)
- * Club domestic league appearances and goals as of 20 July 2024 ‡ National team caps and goals as of 6 December 2019

Gong Qiule (simplified Chinese: 龚秋乐; traditional Chinese: 龔秋樂; pinyin: Gōng Qiūlè; born 27 July 1999) is a Chinese footballer currently playing as a full-back for Foshan Nanshi.

== Club career ==
Gong Qiule was promoted to the senior team of Hebei China Fortune within the 2019 Chinese Super League season and would make his debut in a league game on 20 October 2019 against Jiangsu Suning F.C. in a 4-1 defeat. Initially starting as a forward he would go on to score his first goal for the club on his second appearance on 1 December 2019 against Wuhan Zall in a 2-1 victory. He would go on to be loaned out to third-tier club Wuhan Three Towns for the 2020 China League Two campaign where he would aid them in winning the division title and promotion into the second tier.

On 28 April 2022, Gong would join second tier second-tier club Kunshan on a free transfer. He would make his debut in a league game on 18 June 2022 against Qingdao Hainiu in a 1-0 victory, where he played as a full-back. He would go on to establish himself as regular within the team that won the division and promotion to the top tier at the end of the 2022 China League One campaign.

== Career statistics ==
As of match played 20 July 2024.

Appearances and goals by club, season and competition
Club	Season	League			Cup		Continental		Other		Total	
Club	Season	Division	Apps	Goals	Apps	Goals	Apps	Goals	Apps	Goals	Apps	Goals
Hebei China Fortune	2019	Chinese Super League	2	1	0	0	–		–		2	1
Hebei China Fortune	2020	Chinese Super League	0	0	0	0	–		–		0	0
Hebei China Fortune	2021	Chinese Super League	3	0	0	0	–		–		3	0
Hebei China Fortune	Total		5	1	0	0	0	0	0	0	5	1
Wuhan Three Towns (loan)	2020	China League Two	3	0	–		–		–		3	0
Kunshan	2022	China League One	16	0	2	1	–		–		18	1
Dongguan United/ Foshan Nanshi	2023	China League One	15	0	2	1	–		–		17	1
Dongguan United/ Foshan Nanshi	2024	China League One	1	0	0	0	–		–		1	0
Dongguan United/ Foshan Nanshi	Total		16	0	2	1	0	0	0	0	18	1
Career total			40	1	4	2	0	0	0	0	44	3

== Honours ==
=== Club ===
Wuhan Three Towns

- China League Two: 2020

Kunshan

- China League One: 2022
