= Zheng Yiming =

Chinese association football player

Personal information
- Date of birth: 12 January 1997 (age 29)
- Place of birth: Danzhou, Hainan, China
- Height: 1.85 m (6 ft 1 in)
- Position: Defender

Team information
- Current team: Shanxi Chongde Ronghai
- Number: 3

Youth career
- –2017: Guangzhou Evergrande

Senior career*
Years	Team	Apps	(Gls)
2018	Stabæk 2	8	(0)
2018–2022	Beijing Guoan	0	(0)
2020	→ Xi'an Daxing Chongde (loan)	7	(0)
2021	→ Xinjiang Tianshan Leopard (loan)	21	(1)
2022	Shaanxi Chang'an Athletic	10	(2)
2023	Guangzhou E-Power		
2024	Guangxi Hengchen	10	(0)
2025-	Shanxi Chongde Ronghai	26	(0)
- * Club domestic league appearances and goals as of 14:01, 31 December 2020 (UTC)

Zheng Yiming (simplified Chinese: 郑一鸣; traditional Chinese: 鄭一鳴; pinyin: Zhèng Yīmíng; born 12 January 1997) is a Chinese professional footballer who plays as a defender for Shanxi Chongde Ronghai.

== Club career ==
Zheng Yiming would make his senior debut at Stabæk 2 in a league game against Elverum on 7 May 2018 that ended in a 3-3 draw.

== Career statistics ==
As of 31 December 2020.

Appearances and goals by club, season and competition
Club	Season	League			National Cup		Continental		Other		Total	
Club	Season	Division	Apps	Goals	Apps	Goals	Apps	Goals	Apps	Goals	Apps	Goals
Stabæk II	2018	2. divisjon	8	0	0	0	–		0	0	8	0
Beijing Guoan	2018	Chinese Super League	0	0	1	0	–		0	0	1	0
Beijing Guoan	2019	Chinese Super League	0	0	1	0	0	0	0 (Note: Appearance in Chinese FA Super Cup)	0	1	0
Beijing Guoan	Total		0	0	2	0	0	0	0	0	2	0
Xi'an Daxing Chongde (loan)	2020	China League Two	7	0	–		–		–		7	0
Career total			15	0	2	0	0	0	0	0	17	0

== Honours ==
=== Club ===
Beijing Guoan

- Chinese FA Cup: 2018
