= Ma Chao (footballer) =

Chinese association football player

Personal information
- Date of birth: 13 June 1998 (age 28)
- Place of birth: Qingdao, Shandong, China
- Height: 1.81 m (5 ft 11 in)
- Position: Left-back

Youth career
- –2017: Torreense
- 2017: Oriental Dragon FC

Senior career*
Years	Team	Apps	(Gls)
2017–2020	Oriental Dragon FC	0	(0)
2017–2019	→ Torreense (loan)	36	(0)
2019–2020	→ Pinhalnovense (loan)	4	(0)
2020–2021	Jiangsu Yancheng Dingli	8	(0)
2021–2022	Xinjiang Tianshan Leopard	48	(1)
2023	Yunnan Yukun	2	(0)
2024	Tai'an Tiankuang	15	(2)
- * Club domestic league appearances and goals as of 14:01, 27 July 2021 (UTC)

Ma Chao (Chinese: 马超; born 13 June 1998) is a Chinese footballer who plays as a left-back.

On 10 September 2024, Chinese Football Association announced that Ma was banned from football-related activities for five years, from 10 September 2024 to 9 September 2029, for involving in match-fixing.

== Career statistics ==
=== Club ===
As of 27 July 2021.

Club	Season	League			Cup		Continental		Other		Total	
Club	Season	Division	Apps	Goals	Apps	Goals	Apps	Goals	Apps	Goals	Apps	Goals
Torreense (loan)	2017–18	Campeonato de Portugal	11	0	2 (Note: Appearances in the Taça de Portugal)	0	–		0	0	13	0
Torreense (loan)	2018–19	Campeonato de Portugal	25	0	2	0	–		0	0	27	0
Torreense (loan)	Total		36	0	4	0	0	0	0	0	40	0
Pinhalnovense (loan)	2019–20	Campeonato de Portugal	4	0	2	0	–		0	0	6	0
Jiangsu Yancheng Dingli	2020	China League Two	8	0	0	0	–		0	0	8	0
Xinjiang Tianshan Leopard	2021	China League One	11	1	0	0	–		0	0	11	1
Career total			124	12	1	0	0	0	7	3	132	15
