= Zhu Mingxin =

Chinese professional footballer

Personal information
- Date of birth: 16 May 1999 (age 27)
- Height: 1.86 m (6 ft 1 in)
- Position: Defender

Team information
- Current team: Jiangxi Dingnan United
- Number: 3

Senior career*
Years	Team	Apps	(Gls)
2020–2022	Changchun Yatai	0	(0)
2020	→ Jiangxi Liansheng (loan)	7	(0)
2021	→ Jiangxi Beidamen (loan)	30	(3)
2022	→ Guangxi Pingguo Haliao (loan)	20	(2)
2023	Guangxi Pingguo Haliao	15	(0)
2024–2025	Jiangxi Lushan	55	(4)
2026	Ganzhou Ruishi	14	(1)
2026–	Jiangxi Dingnan United	0	(0)
- * Club domestic league appearances and goals as of 16:00, 25 October 2025 (UTC)

Zhu Mingxin (Chinese: 朱明鑫; pinyin: Zhū Míngxīn; born 16 May 1999) is a Chinese professional footballer who plays for Jiangxi Dingnan United, as a defender.

== Career statistics ==
As of 25 October 2025.

Club	Season	League			Cup		Other		Total	
Club	Season	Division	Apps	Goals	Apps	Goals	Apps	Goals	Apps	Goals
Jiangxi Liansheng/ Jiangxi Beidamen (loan)	2020	China League One	6	0	–		1 (Note: Appearances in the China League One relegation playoffs)	0	7	0
Jiangxi Liansheng/ Jiangxi Beidamen (loan)	2021	China League One	30	3	1 (Note: Appearances in the Chinese FA Cup)	0	–		31	3
Jiangxi Liansheng/ Jiangxi Beidamen (loan)	Total		36	3	1	0	1	0	38	3
Guangxi Pingguo Haliao (loan)	2022	China League One	20	2	2	0	–		22	2
Guangxi Pingguo Haliao	2021	China League One	15	0	1	0	–		16	0
Guangxi Pingguo Haliao	Total		35	2	3	0	0	0	38	2
Jiangxi Lushan	2024	China League One	26	2	2	2	–		28	2
Jiangxi Lushan	2025	China League Two	25	0	2	0	–		27	0
Jiangxi Lushan	Total		51	2	4	2	0	0	55	2
Career total			122	7	8	2	1	0	131	7
