= Luo Shipeng =

Chinese association football player

Personal information
- Date of birth: 9 June 2000 (age 26)
- Place of birth: Wuhan, Hubei, China
- Height: 1.82 m (6 ft 0 in)
- Position: Forward

Team information
- Current team: Qingdao Youth Island (On loan from Hebei China Fortune)
- Number: 59

Youth career
- –2020: Hebei China Fortune

Senior career*
Years	Team	Apps	(Gls)
2020–	Hebei China Fortune	1	(0)
2021–	Qingdao Youth Island (Loan)	0	(0)
- * Club domestic league appearances and goals as of 14:01, 31 December 2020 (UTC)

Luo Shipeng (Chinese: 罗石鹏; born 9 June 2000) is a Chinese footballer currently playing as a forward for Qingdao Youth Island on loan from Hebei China Fortune.

== Club career ==
Luo Shipeng was promoted to the senior team of Hebei China Fortune within the 2020 Chinese Super League season and would make his debut in a league game on 5 September 2020 against Shanghai SIPG F.C. in a 2-0 victory.

== Career statistics ==
As of 31 December 2020.

Club	Season	League			Cup		Continental		Other		Total	
Club	Season	Division	Apps	Goals	Apps	Goals	Apps	Goals	Apps	Goals	Apps	Goals
Hebei China Fortune	2020	Chinese Super League	1	0	1	0	–		–		2	0
Career total			1	0	1	0	0	0	0	0	2	0
