= Gou Junchen =

Chinese association football player

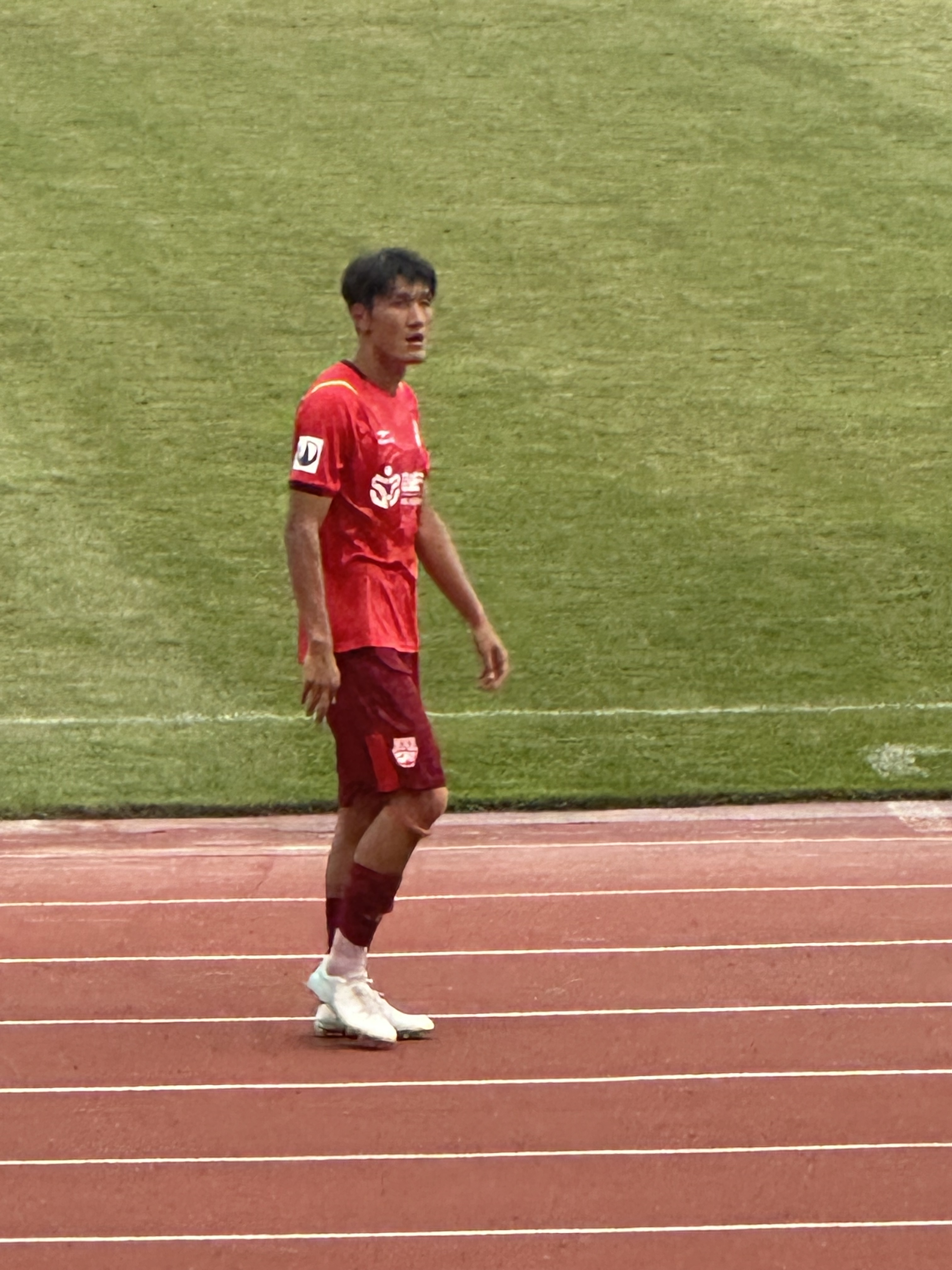
- Gou in August 2024

Personal information
- Date of birth: 20 March 1990 (age 36)
- Place of birth: Beijing, China
- Height: 1.86 m (6 ft 1 in)
- Position: Defender

Team information
- Current team: Wuxi Wugou
- Number: 26

Youth career
- Beijing Guoan

Senior career*
| Years | Team | Apps | (Gls) |
| 2011 | Hebei Zhongji | | |
| 2012 | Hubei Youth | | |
| 2013–2015 | Jiangxi Beidamen | 1 | (0) |
| 2016–2020 | Suzhou Dongwu | 76 | (4) |
| 2021–2023 | Chengdu Rongcheng | 51 | (5) |
| 2024 | Langfang Glory City | 20 | (1) |
| 2025- | Wuxi Wugou | 19 | (0) |
- * Club domestic league appearances and goals as of 14:01, 8 January 2023 (UTC)

Gou Junchen (Chinese: 勾俊晨; born 20 March 1990) is a Chinese footballer currently playing as a defender for Wuxi Wugou.

== Club career ==
Gou played for the Beijing Guoan youth team before joining third tier club Hebei Zhongji. At Jiangxi, he established himself as a member of the team that went on to win the division title and promotion at the end of the 2014 China League Two campaign. He joined third tier club Suzhou Dongwu and established himself as a vital member of the team that gained promotion at the end of the 2019 China League Two campaign.

On 12 April 2021, Gou joined second tier football club Chengdu Rongcheng. He made his debut and score his first goal for the club on 26 April 2021 in a league game against Jiangxi Beidamen, which ended in a 4-2 victory. At the end of the season, he established himself as a regular within the team and aid them to promotion at the end of the 2021 league campaign.

== Career statistics ==
As of 8 January 2023.

| Club | Season | League | | | Cup | | Continental | | Other | | Total | |
| Club | Season | Division | Apps | Goals | Apps | Goals | Apps | Goals | Apps | Goals | Apps | Goals |
|---|---|---|---|---|---|---|---|---|---|---|---|---|
| Hebei Zhongji | 2011 | China League Two | | | - | | - | | - | | | |
| Hubei Youth | 2012 | China League Two | | | 0 | 0 | - | | - | | | |
| Jiangxi Beidamen | 2013 | China League Two | | | - | | - | | - | | | |
| Jiangxi Beidamen | 2014 | China League Two | | | 0 | 0 | - | | - | | | |
| Jiangxi Beidamen | 2015 | China League One | 1 | 0 | 0 | 0 | - | | - | | 1 | 0 |
| Jiangxi Beidamen | Total | | 1 | 0 | 0 | 0 | 0 | 0 | 0 | 0 | 1 | 0 |
| Suzhou Dongwu | 2016 | China League Two | 4 | 0 | 1 | 0 | - | | - | | 5 | 0 |
| Suzhou Dongwu | 2017 | China League Two | 16 | 0 | 3 | 0 | - | | - | | 19 | 0 |
| Suzhou Dongwu | 2018 | China League Two | 11 | 0 | 0 | 0 | - | | - | | 11 | 0 |
| Suzhou Dongwu | 2019 | China League Two | 32 | 3 | 1 | 0 | - | | - | | 33 | 3 |
| Suzhou Dongwu | 2020 | China League One | 13 | 1 | 1 | 0 | - | | - | | 14 | 1 |
| Suzhou Dongwu | Total | | 76 | 4 | 6 | 0 | 0 | 0 | 0 | 0 | 82 | 4 |
| Chengdu Rongcheng | 2021 | China League One | 27 | 3 | 0 | 0 | - | | 2 (Note: Appearance(s) in CSL Relegation play-offs) | 0 | 29 | 3 |
| Chengdu Rongcheng | 2022 | Chinese Super League | 17 | 2 | 1 | 0 | - | | - | | 18 | 2 |
| Chengdu Rongcheng | Total | | 44 | 5 | 1 | 0 | 0 | 0 | 2 | 0 | 47 | 5 |
| Career total | | | 121 | 9 | 7 | 0 | 0 | 0 | 2 | 0 | 130 | 9 |

== Honours ==
=== Club ===
Jiangxi Liansheng

- China League Two: 2014
