= Shi Xiaodong =

Chinese association football player

Personal information
- Date of birth: 26 February 1997 (age 29)
- Place of birth: Shanghai, China
- Height: 1.85 m (6 ft 1 in)
- Position: Goalkeeper

Senior career*
Years	Team	Apps	(Gls)
2016–2021	Shanghai SIPG	0	(0)
2020	→ Nantong Zhiyun (loan)	15	(0)
2021–2023	Nantong Zhiyun	84	(0)
2024	Nantong Zhiyun	1	(0)
Total		100	(0)

International career
- China U19
- * Club domestic league appearances and goals as of 14:01, 31 December 2022 (UTC)

Shi Xiaodong (Chinese: 施晓东; born 26 February 1997) is a Chinese former footballer who played as a goalkeeper.

On 10 September 2024, Chinese Football Association announced that Shi was banned from football-related activities for lifetime for involving in match-fixing.

== Club career ==
Shi Xiaodong was promoted to the Chinese Super League side Shanghai SIPG's first team squad by Sven-Göran Eriksson in 2016. He would be used as a reserve choice goalkeeper for several seasons and was part of the squad that won the 2018 Chinese Super League title. To gain some playing time he would be loaned out to second tier club Nantong Zhiyun and would go on to make his debut in a league game on 13 September 2020 against Xinjiang Tianshan Leopard in a 2-0 victory. On 6 March 2021, Shi would make his loan move permanent. He would go on to establish himself within the team and helped the club gain promotion to the top tier at the end of the 2022 China League One season.

== Career statistics ==
As of 10 August 2024.

Club	Season	League			Cup		Continental		Other		Total	
Club	Season	Division	Apps	Goals	Apps	Goals	Apps	Goals	Apps	Goals	Apps	Goals
Shanghai SIPG	2016	Chinese Super League	0	0	0	0	0	0	–		0	0
Shanghai SIPG	2017	Chinese Super League	0	0	0	0	0	0	–		0	0
Shanghai SIPG	2018	Chinese Super League	0	0	0	0	0	0	–		0	0
Shanghai SIPG	2019	Chinese Super League	0	0	0	0	0	0	0 (Note: Appearances in Chinese FA Super Cup)	0	0	0
Shanghai SIPG	Total		0	0	0	0	0	0	0	0	0	0
Nantong Zhiyun (loan)	2020	China League One	15	0	0	0	–		–		15	0
Nantong Zhiyun	2021	China League One	34	0	1	0	–		–		35	0
Nantong Zhiyun	2022	China League One	32	0	0	0	–		–		32	0
Nantong Zhiyun	2023	Chinese Super League	18	0	0	0	–		–		18	0
Nantong Zhiyun	Total		84	0	1	0	0	0	0	0	85	0
Nantong Zhiyun	2024	Chinese Super League	1	0	0	0	–		–		1	0
Career total			100	0	1	0	0	0	0	0	101	0

== Honours ==
=== Club ===
Shanghai SIPG

- Chinese Super League: 2018
