= Lin Guoyu =

Chinese association football player

Personal information
- Date of birth: 2 March 2000 (age 26)
- Place of birth: Qingdao, Shandong, China
- Height: 1.92 m (6 ft 4 in)
- Position: Defender

Team information
- Current team: Nantong Zhiyun
- Number: 13

Youth career
- –2020: Shandong Taishan

Senior career*
Years	Team	Apps	(Gls)
2020–2022	Shandong Taishan	0	(0)
2021	→ Wuhan FC (loan)	1	(0)
2023–2025	Taian Tiankuang	44	(2)
2026–	Nantong Zhiyun	0	(0)
- * Club domestic league appearances and goals as of 9 March 2026

Lin Guoyu (Chinese: 蔺国玉; born 2 March 2000) is a Chinese footballer currently playing as a defender for Nantong Zhiyun.

== Club career ==
Lin Guoyu was promoted to the senior team of Shandong Luneng within the 2020 Chinese Super League season by the head coach Li Xiaopeng. He made his debut in a Chinese FA Cup game against Dalian Professional F.C. on 18 September 2020 in a 4-0 victory, where he came on as a substitute for Wang Tong. The following season he was loaned out to top tier club Wuhan and would go on to make his league debut on 3 January 2022 against Chongqing Liangjiang Athletic in a 2-1 defeat. On his return to Shandong, Lin would be included in a youth team squad to participate in the 2022 AFC Champions League as the senior team were unable to participate, due to the strict Chinese COVID-19 quarantine regulations.

== Career statistics ==
As of 31 January 2023.

Club	Season	League			Cup		Continental		Other		Total	
Club	Season	Division	Apps	Goals	Apps	Goals	Apps	Goals	Apps	Goals	Apps	Goals
Shandong Taishan	2020	Chinese Super League	0	0	1	0	–		–		1	0
Shandong Taishan	2021	Chinese Super League	0	0	0	0	–		–		0	0
Shandong Taishan	2022	Chinese Super League	0	0	0	0	6	0	–		6	0
Shandong Taishan	Total		0	0	1	0	6	0	0	0	7	0
Wuhan (loan)	2021	Chinese Super League	1	0	2	0	–		–		3	0
Career total			1	0	3	0	6	0	0	0	10	0
