= Ji Shengpan =

Chinese association football player

Personal information
- Date of birth: 8 November 1999 (age 27)
- Place of birth: Wenzhou, Zhejiang, China
- Height: 1.78 m (5 ft 10 in)
- Positions: Forward; right winger

Team information
- Current team: Tianjin Jinmen Tiger
- Number: 20

Youth career
- –2018: Shandong Taishan

Senior career*
Years	Team	Apps	(Gls)
2018–2021	Shandong Taishan	0	(0)
2018–2020	→ Zibo Cuju (loan)	26	(7)
2021	→ Beijing BSU (loan)	34	(7)
2022	Zibo Cuju	33	(12)
2023–2024	Zhejiang FC	10	(1)
2024	→ Nantong Zhiyun (loan)	22	(1)
2025	Meizhou Hakka	15	(2)
2026–	Tianjin Jinmen Tiger	26	(4)
- * Club domestic league appearances and goals as of 22 November 2026

Ji Shengpan (Chinese: 季胜攀; born 8 November 1999) is a Chinese footballer currently playing as a forward or right winger for Tianjin Jinmen Tiger.

== Club career ==
Ji Shengpan would play for the Shandong Taishan youth team before going out on loan to third tier football club Zibo Cuju on 13 July 2018. He would continue to be loaned out to Zibo and was part of the team that gained promotion to the second tier at the end of the 2020 China League Two season. On 12 April 2021 he would be loaned out to second tier club Beijing BSU for the 2021 China League One season and while he went on to establish himself as vital member of the team as well as personally scoring seven league goals he was allowed to leave his parent club and permanently joined Zibo on 29 April 2022. Back at Zibo, he would personally have his most productive season where he personally scored 13 goals throughout the season, which saw top tier club Zhejiang FC go on to sign him on 18 February 2023.

== Career statistics ==
As of 2 November 2024.

Club	Season	League			Cup		Continental		Other		Total	
Club	Season	Division	Apps	Goals	Apps	Goals	Apps	Goals	Apps	Goals	Apps	Goals
Zibo Cuju (loan)	2018	China League Two	4	2	0	0	–		–		4	2
Zibo Cuju (loan)	2019	China League Two	10	3	0	0	–		–		10	3
Zibo Cuju (loan)	2020	China League Two	12	2	–		–		–		12	2
Zibo Cuju (loan)	Total		26	7	0	0	0	0	0	0	26	7
Beijing BSU (loan)	2021	China League One	34	7	0	0	–		–		34	7
Zibo Cuju	2022	China League One	33	12	2	1	–		–		35	13
Zhejiang Professional	2023	Chinese Super League	10	1	1	0	0	0	–		11	1
Nantong Zhiyun (loan)	2024	Chinese Super League	22	1	2	0	–		–		24	1
Career total			125	28	5	1	0	0	0	0	130	29
