= Zheng Shengxiong =

Chinese association football player

Personal information
- Date of birth: 5 January 1999 (age 27)
- Place of birth: Guiyang, Guizhou, China
- Height: 1.76 m (5 ft 9 in)
- Position: Midfielder

Team information
- Current team: Guizhou Guiyang Athletic
- Number: 17

Youth career
- Sichuan FA

Senior career*
Years	Team	Apps	(Gls)
2017	Sichuan Jiuniu		
2018–2023	Guangzhou FC	16	(1)
2020	→ Sichuan Jiuniu (loan)	14	(2)
2021	→ Sichuan Jiuniu (loan)	33	(3)
2024–	Guizhou Guiyang Athletic	45	(0)
- * Club domestic league appearances and goals as of 14:01, 6 May 2022 (UTC)

Zheng Shengxiong (Chinese: 郑圣雄; born 5 January 1999) is a Chinese footballer currently playing as a midfielder for Guizhou Guiyang Athletic.

== Career ==
Born in Guizhou, China, Zheng began his career with the Sichuan Football Association, also featuring for Sichuan Jiuniu in the 2017 China Amateur Football League. He joined Guangzhou Evergrande in 2018. In June 2020 he was loaned to former club Sichuan Jiuniu, who were competing in the China League One. He returned to Sichuan Jiuniu on loan in April 2021. He was named as the best player in the league's Wuhan division at the conclusion of the 2021 season.

Following his release from Guangzhou at the end of the 2023 season, he joined China League Two club Guizhou Guiyang Athletic. He was part of Guizhou Guiyang Athletic's Chinese FA Cup run in the 2025 season, as they beat Guangzhou Red Treasure and Foshan Nanshi before losing 1–0 to Chinese Super League club Tianjin Jinmen Tiger. He was issued a 3-match suspension by the Chinese Football Association after committing an act of violent conduct in Guizhou Guiyang Athletic's 4–2 loss to Guangzhou Dandelion on 6 July 2025.

== Career statistics ==
=== Club ===
As of 8 July 2026.

Appearances and goals by club, season and competition
Club	Season	League			Cup (Note: Includes Chinese FA Cup)		Other		Total	
Club	Season	Division	Apps	Goals	Apps	Goals	Apps	Goals	Apps	Goals
Guangzhou	2020	Chinese Super League	0	0	0	0	0	0	0	0
Guangzhou	2021	Chinese Super League	0	0	0	0	0	0	0	0
Guangzhou	2022	Chinese Super League	10	0	2	0	0	0	12	0
Guangzhou	2023	China League One	6	1	0	0	0	0	6	1
Guangzhou	Total		16	1	2	0	0	0	18	1
Sichuan Jiuniu (loan)	2020	China League One	14	2	0	0	0	0	14	2
Sichuan Jiuniu (loan)	2021	China League One	33	3	4	0	0	0	37	3
Sichuan Jiuniu (loan)	Total		47	5	4	0	0	0	51	5
Guizhou Guiyang Athletic	2024	Chinese Champions League	12	0	0	0	0	0	12	0
Guizhou Guiyang Athletic	2025	China League Two	21	0	3	0	0	0	24	0
Guizhou Guiyang Athletic	2026	China League Two	12	0	1	0	0	0	13	0
Guizhou Guiyang Athletic	Total		45	0	4	0	0	0	49	0
Career total			108	6	10	0	0	0	118	6
