= Sabit Abdusalam =

Chinese footballer (born 1994)

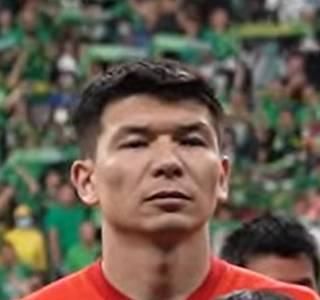
- Sabit in June 2023

Personal information
- Date of birth: 26 March 1994 (age 32)
- Place of birth: Yining, Xinjiang, China
- Height: 1.78 m (5 ft 10 in)
- Positions: Midfielder; forward

Team information
- Current team: Jiangxi Lushan
- Number: 10

Youth career
- –2013: Xinjiang Youth
- 2014–2015: Xinjiang Tianshan Leopard

Senior career*
Years	Team	Apps	(Gls)
2015–2020	Xinjiang Tianshan Leopard	105	(16)
2021–2022	Cangzhou Mighty Lions	32	(1)
2023–2024	Changchun Yatai	29	(0)
2025–	Jiangxi Lushan	37	(6)
- * Club domestic league appearances and goals as of 15 April 2023

Sabit Abdusalam (Chinese: 萨比提·阿布都沙拉木; born 26 March 1994), known as Abdul'eziz Abdusalam (Chinese: 阿卜杜力艾则孜) until 2017, is a Chinese footballer currently playing as a midfielder or forward for Jiangxi Lushan.

== Club career ==
Sabit Abdusalam would play for Xinjiang Youth and was part of the team that qualified for the first round of the 2013 Chinese FA Cup and made his first senior appearance in the team that on 30 March 2016 beat Jiaozhou Fengfa 2–1. He would go on to join second-tier club Xinjiang Tianshan Leopard and make his debut in 2015 Chinese FA Cup game on 19 August 2015 against Jiangsu Guoxin-Sainty in a 3–1 defeat. He would gradually start to establish himself as a regular within the team and go on to score his first goal for the club in a league game on 12 March 2016 against Shenzhen in a 2–1 defeat.

On 3 April 2021, Sabit Abdusalam left Xinjiang Tianshan Leopard after making over a hundred appearances for them to join top-tier club Cangzhou Mighty Lions. He would make his debut in a league game on 14 May 2021 against Guangzhou City in a 0–0 draw. This would be followed by his first goal for the club, which was in a league game on 21 December 2021 against Tianjin Jinmen Tiger in a 2–1 victory.

On 30 March 2022, Sabit would join fellow top-tier club Changchun Yatai on a free transfer for the start of the 2022 Chinese Super League season. He would make his debut for Changchun in a league game on 15 April 2023 against Zhejiang Professional in a 2–0 victory.

== Career statistics ==
As of 31 December 2022.

Club	Season	League			Cup		Continental		Other		Total	
Club	Season	Division	Apps	Goals	Apps	Goals	Apps	Goals	Apps	Goals	Apps	Goals
Xinjiang Youth	2013	–			2	0	–		–		2	0
Xinjiang Tianshan Leopard	2015	China League One	7	0	1	0	–		–		8	0
Xinjiang Tianshan Leopard	2016	China League One	26	3	2	0	–		–		28	3
Xinjiang Tianshan Leopard	2017	China League One	10	2	0	0	–		–		10	2
Xinjiang Tianshan Leopard	2018	China League One	29	6	0	0	–		–		29	6
Xinjiang Tianshan Leopard	2019	China League One	23	5	0	0	–		–		23	5
Xinjiang Tianshan Leopard	2020	China League One	15	1	0	0	–		2 (Note: Appearance(s) in Promotion/Relegation Play-offs)	0	17	1
Xinjiang Tianshan Leopard	Total		110	17	3	0	0	0	2	0	115	17
Cangzhou Mighty Lions	2021	Chinese Super League	9	1	2	0	–		–		11	1
Cangzhou Mighty Lions	2022	Chinese Super League	23	0	1	1	–		–		23	5
Cangzhou Mighty Lions	Total		32	1	3	1	0	0	0	0	35	2
Career total			142	18	8	1	0	0	2	0	152	19
