= Gu Junjie (footballer) =

Chinese association football player

Personal information
- Date of birth: 7 March 1988 (age 38)
- Place of birth: Dalian, Liaoning, China
- Height: 1.89 m (6 ft 2 in)
- Position: Goalkeeper

Senior career*
Years	Team	Apps	(Gls)
- Shenyang Dongjin
2013	Lijiang Jiayunhao		
2014–2020	Xinjiang Tianshan Leopard	104	(0)
2021–2022	Zibo Cuju	12	(0)
2022–2024	Xinjiang Tianshan Leopard	3	(0)
Medal record
Representing China
Men's football
AFC U-17 Championship
Gold medal – first place	2004 Japan	Team
- * Club domestic league appearances and goals as of 14:01, 28 July 2021 (UTC)

Gu Junjie (Chinese: 顾俊杰; born 7 March 1988) is a Chinese former footballer who played as a goalkeeper.

On 10 September 2024, Chinese Football Association announced that Gu was banned from football-related activities for lifetime for involving in match-fixing.

== Career statistics ==
=== Club ===
As of 28 July 2021.

Club	Season	League			Cup		Continental		Other		Total	
Club	Season	Division	Apps	Goals	Apps	Goals	Apps	Goals	Apps	Goals	Apps	Goals
Xinjiang Tianshan Leopard	2014	China League One	3	0	0	0	–		0	0	3	0
Xinjiang Tianshan Leopard	2015	China League One	11	0	2 (Note: Appearances in the Chinese FA Cup)	0	–		0	0	13	0
Xinjiang Tianshan Leopard	2016	China League One	30	0	2	0	–		0	0	32	0
Xinjiang Tianshan Leopard	2017	China League One	19	0	0	0	–		0	0	19	0
Xinjiang Tianshan Leopard	2018	China League One	12	0	1	0	–		0	0	13	0
Xinjiang Tianshan Leopard	2019	China League One	26	0	0	0	–		0	0	26	0
Xinjiang Tianshan Leopard	2020	China League One	3	0	0	0	–		2 (Note: Appearances in the China League One playoffs)	0	5	0
Xinjiang Tianshan Leopard	Total		104	0	5	0	0	0	2	0	111	0
Zibo Cuju	2020	China League One	12	0	0	0	–		0	0	12	0
Career total			116	0	5	0	0	0	2	0	123	0
