= Xia Ao =

Chinese association football player

Personal information
- Date of birth: 11 February 1999 (age 27)
- Height: 1.80 m (5 ft 11 in)
- Position: Defender

Team information
- Current team: Yanbian Longding

Senior career*
| Years | Team | Apps | (Gls) |
| 2018–2021 | Wuhan Zall | 0 | (0) |
| 2021 | → Yanbian Longding (loan) | 15 | (0) |
| 2022- | Yanbian Longding | 0 | (0) |
- * Club domestic league appearances and goals as of 14:01, 5 May 2022 (UTC)

Xia Ao (simplified Chinese: 夏奥; traditional Chinese: 夏奧; pinyin: Xià Ào; born 11 February 1999) is a Chinese footballer currently playing as a defender for Yanbian Longding.

== Club career ==
Xia Ao would be promoted to the senior team of Wuhan Zall in the 2018 China League One campaign and be part of the squad that gained promotion to the top tier with the club when they won the 2018 China League One division. He would go on to make his debut on 1 May 2019 in a Chinese FA Cup game against Shanghai SIPG F.C. that ended in a 3-1 defeat.

== Career statistics ==
As of 31 December 2020.

| Club | Season | League | | | National Cup | | Continental | | Other | | Total | |
| Club | Season | Division | Apps | Goals | Apps | Goals | Apps | Goals | Apps | Goals | Apps | Goals |
|---|---|---|---|---|---|---|---|---|---|---|---|---|
| Wuhan Zall | 2018 | China League One | 0 | 0 | 0 | 0 | – | | – | | 0 | 0 |
| Wuhan Zall | 2019 | Chinese Super League | 0 | 0 | 1 | 0 | – | | – | | 1 | 0 |
| Wuhan Zall | 2020 | Chinese Super League | 0 | 0 | 4 | 0 | – | | 0 (Note: Appearance(s) in CSL Relegation play-offs) | 0 | 4 | 0 |
| Wuhan Zall | Total | | 0 | 0 | 5 | 0 | 0 | 0 | 0 | 0 | 5 | 0 |
| Career total | | | 0 | 0 | 5 | 0 | 0 | 0 | 0 | 0 | 5 | 0 |

== Honours ==
=== Club ===
Wuhan Zall

- China League One: 2018
