= Jiang Yu (footballer) =

Chinese association football player

Personal information
- Date of birth: 20 September 1998 (age 28)
- Height: 1.78 m (5 ft 10 in)
- Position: Midfielder

Team information
- Current team: Zibo Cuju
- Number: 33

Youth career
- –2017: Beijing Renhe
- 2018: Heilongjiang Lava Spring
- 2019–2020: Chongqing Dangdai

Senior career*
Years	Team	Apps	(Gls)
2021–	Zibo Cuju	7	(0)
- * Club domestic league appearances and goals as of 14:01, 28 July 2021 (UTC)

Jiang Yu (Chinese: 江渝; born 20 September 1998) is a Chinese footballer currently playing as a midfielder for Zibo Cuju.

== Career statistics ==
=== Club ===
As of 28 July 2021.

Club	Season	League			Cup		Continental		Other		Total	
Club	Season	Division	Apps	Goals	Apps	Goals	Apps	Goals	Apps	Goals	Apps	Goals
Zibo Cuju	2020	China League One	7	0	0	0	–		0	0	7	0
Career total			7	0	0	0	0	0	0	0	7	0
