= Yu Shanwen =

Chinese association football player

Personal information
- Date of birth: 9 August 2000 (age 26)
- Height: 1.80 m (5 ft 11 in)
- Position: Forward

Team information
- Current team: Qingdao Kangtine

Youth career
- Villarreal
- 2011–2015: Wuhan FA
- 2016–2017: Hebei China Fortune

Senior career*
| Years | Team | Apps | (Gls) |
| 2018 | Iwate Grulla Morioka | 0 | (0) |
| 2019–2020 | Guangzhou | 0 | (0) |
| 2020– | → Qingdao Kangtine (loan) | 5 | (0) |

International career
| 2015 | China U16 | | |
- * Club domestic league appearances and goals as of 14:01, 25 July 2021 (UTC)

Yu Shanwen (Chinese: 余善文; pinyin: Yú Shànwén; born 9 August 2000) is a Chinese footballer who plays for Qingdao Kangtine, on loan from Guangzhou.

== Club career ==
In 2018, Yu joined Japanese third division side Iwate Grulla Morioka.

Yu joined Qingdao Kangtine on loan for the 2020 and 2021 seasons from Guangzhou.

== Career statistics ==
As of 25 July 2021.

=== Club ===
| Club | Season | League | | | Cup | | Other | | Total | |
| Club | Season | Division | Apps | Goals | Apps | Goals | Apps | Goals | Apps | Goals |
|---|---|---|---|---|---|---|---|---|---|---|
| Iwate Grulla Morioka | 2018 | J3 League | 0 | 0 | 0 | 0 | 0 | 0 | 0 | 0 |
| Guangzhou | 2019 | Chinese Super League | 0 | 0 | 0 | 0 | 0 | 0 | 0 | 0 |
| Guangzhou | 2020 | Chinese Super League | 0 | 0 | 0 | 0 | 0 | 0 | 0 | 0 |
| Guangzhou | 2021 | Chinese Super League | 0 | 0 | 0 | 0 | 0 | 0 | 0 | 0 |
| Guangzhou | Total | | 0 | 0 | 0 | 0 | 0 | 0 | 0 | 0 |
| Qingdao Kangtine | 2020 | China League Two | 3 | 0 | 0 | 0 | 0 | 0 | 3 | 0 |
| Qingdao Kangtine | 2021 | China League Two | 2 | 0 | 0 | 0 | 0 | 0 | 2 | 0 |
| Qingdao Kangtine | Total | | 5 | 0 | 0 | 0 | 0 | 0 | 5 | 0 |
| Career total | | | 5 | 0 | 0 | 0 | 0 | 0 | 5 | 0 |
