= Wang Zihao =

Chinese footballer

Wang Zihao 王子豪
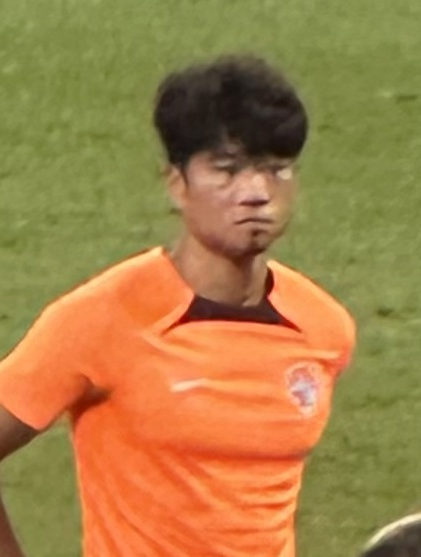
- Wang Zihao in August 2024

Personal information
- Full name: Wang Zihao
- Date of birth: 17 August 1994 (age 32)
- Place of birth: Beijing, China
- Height: 1.74 m (5 ft 8 1/2 in)
- Position: Midfielder

Team information
- Current team: Yanbian Longding
- Number: 23

Youth career
- Beijing Guoan
- Hebei Youth

Senior career*
| Years | Team | Apps | (Gls) |
| 2011 | Hebei Zhongji | 6 | (1) |
| 2012 | Hebei Youth | 24 | (5) |
| 2013–2020 | Shijiazhuang Ever Bright | 101 | (4) |
| 2021 | Beijing BIT | 24 | (4) |
| 2022–2023 | Jinan Xingzhou | 39 | (11) |
| 2024–2025 | Qingdao Hainiu | 9 | (0) |
| 2025– | Yanbian Longding | 0 | (0) |
- * Club domestic league appearances and goals as of 26 April 2022

Wang Zihao (Chinese: 王子豪; born 17 August 1994) is a Chinese professional footballer who currently plays as a midfielder for Jinan Yanbian Longding.

== Club career ==
Wang Zihao was born in Hebei and he started his professional football career in 2011 when he joined Hebei Zhongji for the 2011 China League Two campaign. The following season in 2012, he joined another China League Two club in Hebei Youth. Wang would move to a China League One club in Shijiazhuang Ever Bright in 2013. He would go on to become a regular within the team and would gain promotion to the top tier with the club at the end of the 2014 China League One campaign.

On 26 September 2015, he made his top tier debut for Shijiazhuang in the 2015 Chinese Super League against Shanghai Shenhua, coming on as a substitute for Eiður Guðjohnsen in the 91st minute. Unfortunately he would be part of the team that was relegated the following season, however by the 2019 league season he would help the team gain promotion back into the top tier.

== Career statistics ==
Statistics accurate as of match played 31 December 2020.

Appearances and goals by club, season and competition
| Club | Season | League | | | National Cup | | Continental | | Other | | Total | |
| Club | Season | Division | Apps | Goals | Apps | Goals | Apps | Goals | Apps | Goals | Apps | Goals |
|---|---|---|---|---|---|---|---|---|---|---|---|---|
| Hebei Zhongji | 2011 | China League Two | 6 | 1 | - | | - | | - | | 6 | 1 |
| Hebei Youth | 2012 | China League Two | 24 | 5 | - | | - | | - | | 24 | 5 |
| Shijiazhuang Ever Bright | 2013 | China League One | 0 | 0 | 0 | 0 | - | | - | | 0 | 0 |
| Shijiazhuang Ever Bright | 2014 | China League One | 24 | 2 | 0 | 0 | - | | - | | 24 | 2 |
| Shijiazhuang Ever Bright | 2015 | Chinese Super League | 4 | 0 | 1 | 0 | - | | - | | 5 | 0 |
| Shijiazhuang Ever Bright | 2016 | Chinese Super League | 2 | 0 | 2 | 0 | - | | - | | 4 | 0 |
| Shijiazhuang Ever Bright | 2017 | China League One | 16 | 0 | 1 | 0 | - | | - | | 17 | 0 |
| Shijiazhuang Ever Bright | 2018 | China League One | 22 | 2 | 0 | 0 | - | | - | | 22 | 2 |
| Shijiazhuang Ever Bright | 2019 | China League One | 22 | 0 | 0 | 0 | - | | - | | 22 | 0 |
| Shijiazhuang Ever Bright | 2020 | Chinese Super League | 11 | 0 | 1 | 0 | - | | - | | 12 | 0 |
| Shijiazhuang Ever Bright | Total | | 101 | 4 | 5 | 0 | 0 | 0 | 0 | 0 | 106 | 4 |
| Career total | | | 131 | 10 | 5 | 0 | 0 | 0 | 0 | 0 | 136 | 10 |
