= Li Haowen =

Chinese footballer

Li Haowen 李浩文
Personal information
- Date of birth: 29 November 1993 (age 32)
- Place of birth: Shanghai, China
- Height: 1.82 m (5 ft 11 1/2 in)
- Position: Forward

Team information
- Current team: SH Mitsubishi
- Number: 12

Senior career*
| Years | Team | Apps | (Gls) |
| 2011–2012 | Shanghai Zobon | ? | (?) |
| 2013–2020 | Shanghai SIPG | 14 | (2) |
| 2017 | → Suzhou Dongwu (loan) | 22 | (6) |
| 2020 | → Suzhou Dongwu (loan) | 13 | (3) |
| 2021–2022 | Suzhou Dongwu | 53 | (6) |
| 2023– | SH Mitsubishi | ? | (?) |
- * Club domestic league appearances and goals as of 31 December 2023

Li Haowen (Chinese: 李浩文; born 29 November 1993 in Shanghai) is a Chinese football player who plays for SH Mitsubishi.

== Club career ==
Li Haowen started his professional football career in 2011 when he was loaned to Shanghai Zobon's squad for the 2011 China League Two campaign. He joined Chinese Super League's newcomer Shanghai Dongya in 2013. He eventually made his league debut for Shanghai on 26 April 2014 in a game against Shanghai Shenhua, coming on as a substitute for Tobias Hysén in the 69th minute. On 28 May 2014, he scored his first goal for Shanghai Dongya in a 1–0 home win over Harbin Yiteng. In March 2017, Li was loaned to League Two side Suzhou Dongwu until 31 December 2017. He was sent to the Shanghai SIPG U23 team in 2018.

== Career statistics ==
Statistics accurate as of match played 31 December 2023.

Appearances and goals by club, season and competition
| Club | Season | League | | | National Cup | | Continental | | Other | | Total | |
| Club | Season | Division | Apps | Goals | Apps | Goals | Apps | Goals | Apps | Goals | Apps | Goals |
|---|---|---|---|---|---|---|---|---|---|---|---|---|
| Shanghai Zobon | 2011 | China League Two | | | - | | - | | - | | | |
| Shanghai Zobon | 2012 | China League Two | | | - | | - | | - | | | |
| Shanghai Zobon | Total | | | | 0 | 0 | 0 | 0 | 0 | 0 | | |
| Shanghai SIPG | 2013 | Chinese Super League | 0 | 0 | 0 | 0 | - | | - | | 0 | 0 |
| Shanghai SIPG | 2014 | Chinese Super League | 6 | 1 | 1 | 0 | - | | - | | 7 | 1 |
| Shanghai SIPG | 2015 | Chinese Super League | 3 | 0 | 1 | 1 | - | | - | | 4 | 1 |
| Shanghai SIPG | 2016 | Chinese Super League | 4 | 1 | 0 | 0 | 3 | 0 | - | | 7 | 1 |
| Shanghai SIPG | 2019 | Chinese Super League | 1 | 0 | 1 | 0 | 0 | 0 | 0 (Note: Appearances in Chinese FA Super Cup) | 0 | 2 | 0 |
| Shanghai SIPG | 2020 | Chinese Super League | 0 | 0 | 1 | 0 | 0 | 0 | - | | 1 | 0 |
| Shanghai SIPG | Total | | 14 | 2 | 4 | 1 | 3 | 0 | 0 | 0 | 21 | 3 |
| Suzhou Dongwu (loan) | 2017 | China League Two | 22 | 6 | 2 | 1 | - | | - | | 24 | 7 |
| Suzhou Dongwu (loan) | 2020 | China League One | 13 | 3 | 0 | 0 | - | | - | | 13 | 3 |
| Suzhou Dongwu | 2021 | China League One | 26 | 4 | 1 | 0 | - | | - | | 27 | 4 |
| Suzhou Dongwu | 2022 | China League One | 27 | 2 | 2 | 1 | - | | - | | 29 | 3 |
| Suzhou Dongwu | Total | | 53 | 6 | 3 | 1 | 0 | 0 | 0 | 0 | 56 | 7 |
| Career total | | | 102 | 17 | 9 | 3 | 3 | 0 | 0 | 0 | 114 | 20 |
