= Lu Yao (footballer) =

Chinese footballer

Lu Yao 路尧
Personal information
- Date of birth: June 26, 1993 (age 33)
- Place of birth: Kaifeng, Henan, China
- Height: 1.76 m (5 ft 9 in)
- Positions: Full-back; midfielder

Team information
- Current team: Yuxi Yukun

Senior career*
Years	Team	Apps	(Gls)
2012–2020	Henan Jianye	61	(0)
2013	→ Shandong Tengding (loan)	14	(0)
2014	→ Sichuan Leaders (loan)	0	(0)
2021	Zibo Cuju	6	(0)
2022-	Yuxi Yukun	0	(0)
- * Club domestic league appearances and goals as of 16 May 2022

Lu Yao (Chinese: 路尧; born 26 June 1993 in Kaifeng, Henan) is a Chinese professional football player who currently plays for Chinese club Yuxi Yukun.

== Club career ==
In July 2012, Lu Yao started his professional footballer career with Henan Jianye in the Chinese Super League. On 16 August 2015, Lu made his debut for Henan in the 2015 Chinese Super League against Guangzhou R&F, coming on as a substitute for Yin Hongbo in the 57th minute.

== Career statistics ==
Statistics accurate as of match played 31 December 2020.

Club	Season	League			National Cup		Continental		Other		Total	
Club	Season	Division	Apps	Goals	Apps	Goals	Apps	Goals	Apps	Goals	Apps	Goals
Henan Jianye	2012	Chinese Super League	0	0	0	0	-		-		0	0
Henan Jianye	2015	Chinese Super League	7	0	0	0	-		-		7	0
Henan Jianye	2016	Chinese Super League	14	0	4	0	-		-		18	0
Henan Jianye	2017	Chinese Super League	5	0	1	0	-		-		6	0
Henan Jianye	2018	Chinese Super League	14	0	1	0	-		-		15	0
Henan Jianye	2019	Chinese Super League	22	0	1	0	-		-		23	0
Henan Jianye	Total		62	0	7	0	0	0	0	0	69	0
Shandong Tengding (loan)	2013	China League Two	14	0	-		-		-		14	0
Sichuan Leaders (loan)	2014	China League Two	0	0	0	0	-		-		0	0
Career total			76	0	7	0	0	0	0	0	83	0
