= Yang Siping =

Chinese association football player

Personal information
- Date of birth: 14 February 1995 (age 31)
- Height: 1.77 m (5 ft 10 in)
- Position: Midfielder

Team information
- Current team: Jiangxi Beidamen
- Number: 25

Senior career*
Years	Team	Apps	(Gls)
2015–2017	Shanghai JuJu Sports	38	(1)
2018	Yunnan Flying Tigers	22	(1)
2019–2020	Lhasa UCI	22	(0)
2021–	Jiangxi Beidamen	10	(0)
- * Club domestic league appearances and goals as of 14:01, 24 August 2021 (UTC)

Yang Siping (Chinese: 杨四平; born 14 February 1995) is a Chinese footballer currently playing as a midfielder for Jiangxi Beidamen.

== Career statistics ==
=== Club ===
As of 24 August 2021.

Club	Season	League			Cup		Other		Total	
Club	Season	Division	Apps	Goals	Apps	Goals	Apps	Goals	Apps	Goals
Shanghai JuJu Sports	2015	China League Two	5	0	0	0	0	0	5	0
Shanghai JuJu Sports	2016	China League Two	12	1	2 (Note: Appearances in the Chinese FA Cup)	0	0	0	14	1
Shanghai JuJu Sports	2017	China League Two	21	0	0	0	2 (Note: Appearances in the China League Two playoffs)	0	23	0
Shanghai JuJu Sports	Total		38	1	2	0	2	0	42	1
Yunnan Flying Tigers	2018	China League Two	22	1	0	0	1	0	23	1
Lhasa UCI	2019	China League Two	22	0	2	0	0	0	24	0
Jiangxi Beidamen	2021	China League One	10	0	0	0	0	0	10	0
Career total			4	0	1	0	0	0	5	0
