= Huang Lei (footballer) =

Chinese association football player

Personal information
- Date of birth: 22 August 2002 (age 24)
- Place of birth: Chongqing, China
- Position: Forward

Youth career
- –2020: Chongqing Lifan

Senior career*
Years	Team	Apps	(Gls)
2020–2022	Chongqing Liangjiang Athletic	0	(0)
2020	→ Suzhou Dongwu (Loan)	2	(0)
- * Club domestic league appearances and goals as of 14:01, 31 December 2020 (UTC)

Huang Lei (Chinese: 黄磊; born 22 August 2002) is a Chinese footballer plays as a forward.

== Club career ==
Huang Lei was promoted to the senior team of Chongqing Lifan within the 2020 Chinese Super League season and would make his debut in a Chinese FA Cup game on 19 September 2020 against Shanghai SIPG F.C. in a 3-2 defeat.

== Career statistics ==
As of 31 December 2020.

Club	Season	League			Cup		Continental		Other		Total	
Club	Season	Division	Apps	Goals	Apps	Goals	Apps	Goals	Apps	Goals	Apps	Goals
Chongqing Lifan	2020	Chinese Super League	0	0	1	0	–		–		1	0
Suzhou Dongwu (loan)	2020	China League One	2	0	0	0	–		–		2	0
Career total			2	0	1	0	0	0	0	0	3	0
