= He Shihua =

Chinese footballer

Personal information
- Date of birth: 26 September 1985 (age 41)
- Place of birth: China
- Position: Forward

Team information
- Current team: Zibo Cuju

Senior career*
Years	Team	Apps	(Gls)
-2020	Sichuan Minzu		
2021-	Zibo Cuju	6	(0)
- * Club domestic league appearances and goals

He Shihua (Chinese: 何世华; born 26 September 1985) is a Chinese businessman and footballer who plays as a forward for Zibo Cuju.

== Career ==
He invested in Chinese fourth division side Sichuan Minzu.

Before the 2021 season, he became chairman of Zibo Cuju in the Chinese second division.

== Career statistics ==
As of 12 July 2021

Appearances and goals by club, season and competition
Club	Season	League			Cup		Total	
Club	Season	Division	Apps	Goals	Apps	Goals	Apps	Goals
Zibo Cuju	2021 China League One	China League One	3	0	-|-		3	0
