= Liao Lei (footballer) =

Chinese association football player

Personal information
- Full name: Liao Lei
- Date of birth: 1 March 1999 (age 27)
- Place of birth: Deyang, Sichuan, China
- Height: 1.79 m (5 ft 10 in)
- Position: Left-back

Team information
- Current team: Xiamen Feilu (on loan from Nantong Zhiyun)
- Number: 13

Youth career
- –2017: Shandong Luneng Taishan

Senior career*
Years	Team	Apps	(Gls)
2018–2019	Estudiantes	29	(0)
2019	FC Jumilla	1	(0)
2019–2020	UD Los Garres	0	(0)
2020–2023	Shenzhen FC	15	(0)
2020	→ Hunan Billows loan)	10	(0)
2021	→ Beijing BSU (loan)	23	(0)
2024–	Nantong Zhiyun	23	(0)
2026–	→ Xiamen Feilu (loan)	0	(0)
- * Club domestic league appearances and goals as of 22:30, 8 March 2026 (UTC)

Liao Lei (Chinese: 廖垒; born 1 March 1999) is a Chinese footballer currently playing as a left-back for China League Two club Xiamen Feilu on loan from Nantong Zhiyun.

== Club career ==
Liao Lei would play for the Shandong Luneng Taishan youth team and would be sent to Brazil to further his development on 24 September 2014. He would not be promoted to the senior team of Shandong and would go to Spain to play for fourth tier club Estudiantes. After going on to establish himself as a regular within the team he would join third tier Spanish club FC Jumilla. His time at Jumilla would be short lived after they were relegated at the end of the 2018–19 Segunda División B league season and were dissolved due to financial difficulties. Liao would join fourth tier club UD Los Garres on 1 July 2019 for the 2019–20 Tercera División campaign.

On 2 July 2020, Liao would join top tier Chinese club Shenzhen before the start of the 2020 Chinese Super League campaign. On 17 October 2020 he would loaned out to third tier Chinese club Hunan Billows. After his loan period ended, Liao would be loaned out once again on 18 April 2021, to second tier club Beijing BSU for the 2021 China League One season.

== Career statistics ==
As of 31 December 2022.

Club	Season	League			Cup		Continental		Other		Total	
Club	Season	Division	Apps	Goals	Apps	Goals	Apps	Goals	Apps	Goals	Apps	Goals
Estudiantes	2018–19	Tercera División	29	0	0	0	-		-		29	0
FC Jumilla	2018–19	Segunda División B	1	0	0	0	-		-		1	0
UD Los Garres	2019–20	Tercera División	0	0	0	0	-		-		0	0
Shenzhen	2020	Chinese Super League	0	0	0	0	-		-		0	0
Shenzhen	2021	Chinese Super League	0	0	0	0	-		-		0	0
Shenzhen	2022	Chinese Super League	3	0	1	0	-		-		4	0
Shenzhen	Total		3	0	1	0	0	0	0	0	4	0
Hunan Billows (loan)	2020	China League Two	10	0	0	0	-		-		10	0
Beijing BSU (loan)	2021	China League One	23	0	1	0	-		-		24	0
Career total			66	0	2	0	0	0	0	0	68	0
