= Huang Cong (footballer, born 2000) =

Chinese association football player

Personal information
- Date of birth: 10 December 2000 (age 25)
- Place of birth: Guiyang, Guizhou, China
- Height: 1.70 m (5 ft 7 in)
- Position: Midfielder

Team information
- Current team: Shanxi Chongde Ronghai

Youth career
- –2019: Jiangsu FA
- 2019–2020: Cova da Piedade

Senior career*
Years	Team	Apps	(Gls)
2019–2020	Cova da Piedade B	10	(2)
2020–2023	Nantong Zhiyun	44	(6)
2020	→ Nanjing City (loan)	6	(0)
2023	Guangdong E-Power		
2024	Guizhou Zhucheng Athletic		
2025–	Shanxi Chongde Ronghai	0	(0)
- * Club domestic league appearances and goals as of 14:01, 28 December 2023 (UTC)

Huang Cong (Chinese: 黄聪; born 10 December 2000) is a Chinese footballer currently playing as a midfielder for Shanxi Chongde Ronghai.

== Club career ==
Huang Cong would initially play for the Jiangsu FA youth setup before moving abroad to join Portuguese football club Cova da Piedade where he played for their reserve team Cova da Piedade B. On 23 July 2020 he would return to China to join second-tier club Nantong Zhiyun, however he would be loaned out to third-tier club Nanjing City, where he was part of the squad gained promotion at the end of the 2020 China League Two campaign. He would go on to make his debut in a league game on 25 April 2021 against Nanjing City in a 1–1 draw. He would go on to establish himself within the team and helped the club gain promotion to the top tier at the end of the 2022 China League One season.

== Career statistics ==
As of 31 December 2022.

Club	Season	League			Cup		Continental		Other		Total	
Club	Season	Division	Apps	Goals	Apps	Goals	Apps	Goals	Apps	Goals	Apps	Goals
Cova da Piedade B	2019–20	Setúbal First Division	10	2	–		–		–		10	2
Nantong Zhiyun	2020	China League One	0	0	0	0	–		–		0	0
Nantong Zhiyun	2021	China League One	18	3	0	0	–		–		18	3
Nantong Zhiyun	2022	China League One	25	3	0	0	–		–		25	3
Nantong Zhiyun	Total		43	6	0	0	0	0	0	0	43	6
Nanjing City (loan)	2020	China League Two	8	0	0	0	–		–		8	0
Career total			61	8	0	0	0	0	0	0	61	8
