= Liu Wenjie (footballer) =

Chinese association football player

Personal information
- Date of birth: 27 September 2001 (age 25)
- Place of birth: Yichun, Jiangxi, China
- Height: 1.92 m (6 ft 4 in)
- Position: Forward

Youth career
- –2020: Guangzhou R&F

Senior career*
Years	Team	Apps	(Gls)
2021	Jiangxi Beidamen	6	(1)
2022	Chongqing Tonglianglong	4	(0)
2023	Shenzhen Boss United		
2023	Guangzhou Dandelion Alpha		
2024	Xinjiang Silk Road Eagle		
2025	Jiangxi Dingnan United	1	(0)
- * Club domestic league appearances and goals as of 14:01, 24 August 2021 (UTC)

Liu Wenjie (Chinese: 刘文杰; born 27 September 2001) is a Chinese footballer currently playing as a forward.

== Career statistics ==
=== Club ===
As of 24 August 2021.

Club	Season	League			Cup		Other		Total	
Club	Season	Division	Apps	Goals	Apps	Goals	Apps	Goals	Apps	Goals
Jiangxi Beidamen	2021	China League One	4	0	1 (Note: Appearances in the Chinese FA Cup)	0	0	0	5	0
Career total			4	0	1	0	0	0	5	0
