= Qiu Zhongyi =

Chinese footballer

Personal information
- Date of birth: 23 February 1996 (age 30)
- Place of birth: Putian, Fujian, China
- Height: 1.83 m (6 ft 0 in)
- Position: Defender

Youth career
- South East Piranha FC
- Argentinos Juniors
- UAI Urquiza
- Acassuso

Senior career*
Years	Team	Apps	(Gls)
2021–2025	Nantong Zhiyun	3	(0)
- * Club domestic league appearances and goals as of 9 March 2026

Qiu Zhongyi (Chinese: 邱仲毅; born 23 February 1996) is a Chinese footballer who plays as a defender.

== Career ==
As a youth player, Qiu joined the youth academy of Australian side South East Piranha FC. At the age of 17, he joined the youth academy of Argentinos Juniors in the Argentine top flight, where he said, "compared with Australian football, the level of the Argentine game is higher and the pace is faster, and most of the offense is done through ground cooperation. At the same time, the Argentine team often pursues an all-attack and all-defense tactic, and the cooperation between the players is very tacit. The competition to play in Argentina is very fierce. Because many players are from slums, playing is the only way for them to change their lives, so they are very hard and serious about training and games."

After that, Qiu joined the youth academy of Argentine third division side UAI Urquiza. Before the 2021 season, he signed for Nantong Zhiyun in China. On 19 August 2021, he debuted for Nantong Zhiyun during a 0-6 loss to Heilongjiang Ice City, however this result was reversed after Heilongjiang failed to fielded an Under 23 youth player. He would go on to be a squad player as the club gained promotion to the top tier at the end of the 2022 China League One season.

== Career statistics ==
Statistics accurate as of match played 31 December 2024.

Appearances and goals by club, season and competition
Club	Season	League			National Cup		Continental		Other		Total	
Club	Season	Division	Apps	Goals	Apps	Goals	Apps	Goals	Apps	Goals	Apps	Goals
Nantong Zhiyun	2021	China League One	0	0	1	0	-		-		1	0
Nantong Zhiyun	2022	China League One	2	0	1	0	-		-		3	0
Nantong Zhiyun	2023	Chinese Super League	0	0	1	0	-		-		1	0
Nantong Zhiyun	2024	Chinese Super League	0	0	1	0	-		-		1	0
Nantong Zhiyun	Total		2	0	4	0	0	0	0	0	6	0
Career total			2	0	4	0	0	0	0	0	6	0
