= Gao Ming (footballer, born 1998) =

Chinese association football player

Personal information
- Date of birth: 2 January 1998 (age 28)
- Height: 1.80 m (5 ft 11 in)
- Position: Midfielder

Team information
- Current team: Jiangxi Beidamen
- Number: 24

Youth career
- –2020: Wuhan

Senior career*
Years	Team	Apps	(Gls)
2021–	Jiangxi Beidamen	8	(0)
- * Club domestic league appearances and goals as of 14:01, 24 August 2021 (UTC)

Gao Ming (Chinese: 高明; born 2 January 1998) is a Chinese footballer currently playing as a midfielder for Jiangxi Beidamen.

== Career statistics ==
=== Club ===
As of 24 August 2021.

Club	Season	League			Cup		Other		Total	
Club	Season	Division	Apps	Goals	Apps	Goals	Apps	Goals	Apps	Goals
Jiangxi Beidamen	2021	China League One	8	0	1 (Note: Appearances in the Chinese FA Cup)	0	0	0	9	0
Career total			8	0	1	0	0	0	9	0
