= List of Chinese football transfers pre-season 2020 =

This is a list of Chinese football transfers for the 2020 season pre-season transfer window.

== Super League ==
=== Beijing Sinobo Guoan ===
In:

No.	Pos.	Nation	Player
11	MF	BRA	Fernando (from (Russia) Spartak Moscow)
16	DF	CHN	Jin Pengxiang (loan return from Guangzhou R&F)
19	FW	CHN	Alan (loan from Guangzhou Evergrande Taobao)
21	MF	ESP	Jonathan Viera (loan return from (Spain) Las Palmas)
24	DF	CHN	Yang Fan (from Tianjin TEDA)
-	MF	CHN	Li Zhenqin (from Tianjin TEDA)
-	MF	CHN	Huang Haiwei (loan return from Shaanxi Chang'an Athletic)
-	GK	CHN	Chi Wenyi (loan return from Hebei China Fortune)

Out:

No.	Pos.	Nation	Player
11	MF	BRA	Fernando (loan return to (Russia) Spartak Moscow)
15	DF	CHN	Liu Huan (loan to Chongqing Dangdai Lifan)
22	GK	CHN	Yang Zhi (Retired)
24	DF	CHN	Zhang Yu (loan to Changchun Yatai)
30	DF	CHN	Lei Tenglong (to Tianjin TEDA)
40	MF	CHN	Wang Congming (to Suzhou Dongwu)
42	MF	CHN	Zhang Boling (to Qingdao Huanghai)
45	DF	CHN	Zhang Zijian (to Changchun Yatai)
47	MF	CHN	Caysar Adiljan (to Hubei Chufeng Heli)
51	MF	CHN	Zhou Xincheng (to Beijing BSU)
55	DF	CHN	Zhang Ran (to Beijing BSU)
-	GK	CHN	Huang Weibo (to Beijing BSU)
-	GK	CHN	Chi Wenyi (to Hebei China Fortune)
-	MF	CHN	Ji Haoxiang (to Qingdao Huanghai)

=== Chongqing Dangdai Lifan ===
In:

No.	Pos.	Nation	Player
10	FW	BRA	Marcelo Cirino (from (Brazil) Athletico Paranaense)
16	GK	CHN	Deng Xiaofei (loan return from Zhejiang Greentown)
19	DF	CHN	Liu Huan (loan from Beijing Sinobo Guoan)
31	MF	CHN	Huang Xiyang (from Wuhan Zall)
35	MF	CHN	Chen Jie (from Beijing Renhe)
-	MF	CHN	Erpanjan Aniwar (from Xinjiang Tianshan Leopard)

Out:

No.	Pos.	Nation	Player
2	DF	CHN	Li Fang (to Sichuan Everglory)
8	MF	CHN	Ding Jie (loan to Zhejiang Yiteng)
21	GK	CHN	Wang Zixiang (to Shenzhen F.C.)
24	FW	CHN	Liu Weidong (Released)
25	MF	CHN	Baxtiyar Pezila (loan to (Spain) Recreativo Granada)
29	MF	CHN	Luo Senwen (loan return to Hebei China Fortune)
36	DF	CHN	Liu Bin (to Henan Jianye)
49	DF	CHN	Zheng Tao (Released)
54	MF	CHN	Cui Yongzhe (Released)
57	MF	CHN	Yang Ke (Released)
-	MF	CHN	Chen Zhongliu (to Suzhou Dongwu)
-	FW	CHN	Zhang Xiaotian (to Inner Mongolia Zhongyou)

=== Dalian Professional ===
In:

No.	Pos.	Nation	Player
5	MF	CHN	Wu Wei (from Tianjin Tianhai)
10	MF	SWE	Sam Larsson (from (Netherlands) Feyenoord)
16	DF	CHN	Tong Lei (from Zhejiang Greentown)
28	MF	CHN	Lin Liangming (loan from (Portugal) Marítimo)
30	DF	SWE	Marcus Danielsson (from (Sweden) Djurgårdens IF)
32	GK	CHN	Xu Jiamin (from Beijing Renhe)
50	FW	CHN	Wang Zhen'ao (from (Denmark) Vejle Boldklub)
-	GK	CHN	Xue Qinghao (from Liaoning F.C.)
-	MF	CHN	Tao Qianglong (from Hebei China Fortune)
-	DF	CHN	Wang Liang (loan return from Dalian Chanjoy)
-	DF	CHN	Zheng Jianfeng (loan return from Dalian Chanjoy)
-	MF	CHN	Yuan Hao (loan return from Shanghai Shenxin)
-	MF	CHN	Gao Mingxin (loan return from Dalian Chanjoy)
-	DF	CHN	Yin Jiahao (loan return from Shenzhen Pengcheng)
-	MF	CHN	Han Peijiang (loan return from Dalian Chanjoy)
-	MF	CHN	Ren Jiawei (loan return from Dalian Chanjoy)
-	MF	CHN	Li Yuqiu (loan return from Yinchuan Helanshan)
-	MF	CHN	Liu Yingchen (loan return from Shanghai Shenxin)

Out:

No.	Pos.	Nation	Player
2	DF	CHN	Zhao Mingjian (to Shanghai Greenland Shenhua)
10	FW	BEL	Yannick Carrasco (loan to (Spain) Atlético Madrid)
16	MF	CHN	Qin Sheng (to Shanghai Greenland Shenhua)
19	GK	CHN	Yu Ziqian (Retired)
38	MF	CHN	Yang Fangzhi (to Zhejiang Yiteng)
-	GK	CHN	Chen Zhongyu (to Meizhou Hakka)
-	MF	CHN	Li Yuqiu (to Qingdao Red Lions)
-	MF	CHN	Liu Yingchen (loan to Beijing Renhe)

=== Guangzhou Evergrande Taobao ===
In:

No.	Pos.	Nation	Player
6	MF	CHN	Liao Lisheng (loan return from Tianjin Tianhai)
13	GK	CHN	Liu Weiguo (loan return from Inner Mongolia Zhongyou)
19	FW	CHN	Fernando Henrique (loan return from Hebei China Fortune) (Note: Player took Chinese citizenship to sign for club)
20	FW	CHN	Aloísio (loan return from Guangdong South China Tiger)
27	DF	CHN	Wu Shaocong (loan return from (Japan) Kyoto Sanga)
36	MF	CHN	He Chao (loan return from Jiangsu Suning)
38	DF	CHN	Liu Yiming (loan return from Shenzhen F.C.)
-	DF	CHN	Hu Ruibao (loan return from Henan Jianye)
-	DF	CHN	Cai Mingmin (loan return from Kunshan F.C.)
-	MF	CHN	Wang Junhui (loan return from Liaoning F.C.)
-	DF	CHN	Chen Zepeng (loan return from Beijing BSU)
-	MF	CHN	Ju Feng (loan return from Changchun Yatai)
-	DF	CHN	Guan Haojin (loan return from Hebei Aoli Jingying)
-	MF	CHN	Wu Yue (loan return from Zibo Cuju)
-	FW	CHN	Ye Guochen (loan return from Wuhan Three Towns)
-	GK	CHN	Li Weijie (loan return from Shanghai Shenxin)
-	MF	CHN	Shewket Yalqun (loan return from Xinjiang Tianshan Leopard)
-	MF	PER	Roberto Siucho (loan return from Shanghai Shenxin)
-	DF	CHN	Liu Ruicheng (loan return from Xinjiang Tianshan Leopard)
-	MF	CHN	Zhang Wenzhao (loan return from Beijing Renhe)
-	FW	CHN	Wang Jinze (loan return from Inner Mongolia Zhongyou)
-	DF	CHN	Wen Jiabao (loan return from Tianjin Tianhai)
-	MF	CHN	Deng Yubiao (loan return from Guangzhou South China Tiger)
-	DF	CHN	Rong Hao (loan return from Tianjin TEDA)
-	FW	CHN	Alan (loan return from Tianjin Tianhai)
-	MF	CHN	Zhang Jiaqi (loan return from Qingdao Huanghai)
-	DF	CHN	Zhang Chenglin (loan return from Tianjin Tianhai)
-	DF	CHN	Guo Jing (loan return from Inner Mongolia Zhongyou)
-	MF	CHN	Dilyimit Tudi (loan return from Xinjiang Tianshan Leopard)

Out:

No.	Pos.	Nation	Player
6	DF	CHN	Feng Xiaoting (loan to Shanghai Greenland Shenhua)
19	GK	CHN	Zeng Cheng (loan to Shanghai Greenland Shenhua)
20	MF	CHN	Yu Hanchao (to Shanghai Greenland Shenhua)
22	MF	CHN	Tang Shi (loan to Beijing BSU)
29	FW	CHN	Gao Lin (to Shenzhen F.C.)
34	MF	CHN	Feng Boxuan (loan to Henan Jianye)
41	DF	CHN	Anizirjan Askar (loan to Beijing BSU)
42	MF	CHN	Abduwahap Aniwar (to Kunshan F.C.)
44	DF	CHN	Chen Quanjiang (loan to Inner Mongolia Zhongyou)
45	FW	CHN	Li Ming (loan to Beijing BSU)
46	MF	CHN	Zheng Shengxiong (loan to Sichuan Jiuniu)
48	MF	CHN	He Xin (to Chengdu Better City)
49	DF	CHN	Wang Wenxuan (loan to Inner Mongolia Zhongyou)
50	MF	CHN	Fan Hengbo (loan to Inner Mongolia Zhongyou)
51	GK	CHN	Mai Gaoling (loan to Inner Mongolia Zhongyou)
-	DF	CHN	Yang Zhaohui (to Beijing Renhe)
-	MF	CHN	Ma Yilun (loan to Inner Mongolia Zhongyou)
-	MF	CHN	Zhang Zheng (loan to Inner Mongolia Zhongyou)
-	FW	CHN	Seydar Siyitjan (loan to Inner Mongolia Zhongyou)
-	FW	CHN	Wang Jingbin (loan to Liaoning Shenyang Urban)
-	MF	CHN	Ricardo Goulart (loan to Hebei China Fortune)
-	MF	CHN	Peng Junxian (to Beijing BSU)
-	MF	PER	Roberto Siucho (loan to Kunshan F.C.)
-	DF	CHN	Liu Ruicheng (to Kunshan F.C.)
-	MF	CHN	Zhang Wenzhao (loan to Beijing Renhe)
-	FW	CHN	Wang Jinze (loan to Shijiazhuang Ever Bright)
-	DF	CHN	Wen Jiabao (to Shanghai Greenland Shenhua)
-	MF	CHN	Deng Yubiao (loan to Shijiazhuang Ever Bright)
-	DF	CHN	Rong Hao (loan to Tianjin TEDA)
-	FW	CHN	Alan (loan to Beijing Sinobo Guoan)
-	MF	CHN	Zhang Jiaqi (to Sichuan Jiuniu)
-	DF	CHN	Zhang Chenglin (loan to Wuhan Zall)
-	DF	CHN	Guo Jing (loan to Henan Jianye)
-	MF	CHN	Dilyimit Tudi (to Changchun Yatai)

=== Guangzhou R&F ===
In:

No.	Pos.	Nation	Player
5	DF	CHN	Li Songyi (loan from Shandong Luneng Taishan)
11	MF	BRA	Renatinho (loan return from Tianjin Tianhai)
14	FW	CHN	Zeng Chao (from Guangdong South China Tiger)
21	FW	CHN	Chang Feiya (loan return from Wuhan Zall)
25	DF	CHN	Chen Zhechao (loan from Shandong Luneng Taishan)
-	MF	CHN	Cai Haojian (loan return from Hubei Chufeng Heli)
-	MF	CHN	Zhang Jiajie (loan return from Sichuan Longfor)
-	DF	CHN	Zhang Chenlong (loan return from Beijing Renhe)

Out:

No.	Pos.	Nation	Player
2	DF	CHN	Zou Zheng (loan to Qingdao Huanghai)
6	MF	CHN	Fan Yunlong (loan to Guizhou Hengfeng)
9	FW	CHN	Gui Hong (loan to Guizhou Hengfeng)
11	DF	CHN	Ding Haifeng (to Hebei China Fortune)
25	GK	CHN	Han Feng (to Shijiazhuang Ever Bright)
27	DF	CHN	Jin Pengxiang (loan return to Beijing Sinobo Guoan)
29	FW	CHN	Xiao Zhi (to Tianjin TEDA)
31	MF	CHN	Wang Jia'nan (to (Japan) Sagan Tosu)
53	FW	CHN	Geng Taili (to Guangxi Baoyun)
62	MF	CHN	Ning An (to Guangxi Baoyun)
64	FW	CHN	Li Rui (to Guangxi Baoyun)
-	DF	CHN	Zheng Zhiming (loan to Taizhou Yuanda)
-	MF	CHN	Yu Zeping (to Guangxi Baoyun)
-	DF	CHN	Li Shusen (to Guangxi Baoyun)
-	DF	CHN	Zhang Chenlong (to Zhejiang Yiteng)

=== Hebei China Fortune ===
In:

No.	Pos.	Nation	Player
5	DF	BIH	Samir Memišević (from (Netherlands) Groningen)
6	MF	CHN	Luo Senwen (loan return from Chongqing Dangdai Lifan)
8	MF	BRA	Paulinho (from (Portugal) Portimonense)
11	FW	SLE	Buya Turay (from (Belgium) Sint-Truidense)
16	MF	CHN	Ricardo Goulart (loan from Guangzhou Evergrande Taobao)
22	GK	CHN	Chi Wenyi (from Beijing Sinobo Guoan)
29	DF	CHN	Chen Xiao (from Zhejiang Greentown)
32	DF	CHN	Ding Haifeng (from Guangzhou R&F)
37	DF	CHN	Pan Ximing (from Tianjin TEDA)
-	FW	MAR	Ayoub El Kaabi (loan return from (Morocco) Wydad AC)
-	MF	CHN	Yao Xuchen (loan return from Beijing BSU)
-	MF	CHN	Zhang Hui (loan return from Wuhan Three Towns)
-	MF	CHN	Chen Ao (loan return from Wuhan Zall)

Out:

No.	Pos.	Nation	Player
1	GK	CHN	Geng Xiaofeng (loan to Inner Mongolia Zhongyou)
5	DF	HKG	Andy Russell (loan to Jiangxi Liansheng)
11	DF	CHN	Jiang Zhipeng (to Shenzhen F.C.)
14	DF	ARG	Javier Mascherano (to (Argentina) Estudiantes (LP))
22	FW	ARG	Ezequiel Lavezzi (Retired)
29	MF	CHN	Tao Qianglong (to Dalian Pro)
32	FW	CHN	Fernando Henrique (loan return to Guangzhou Evergrande Taobao)
33	GK	CHN	Chi Wenyi (loan return to Beijing Sinobo Guoan)
35	MF	CHN	Che Shiwei (to Tianjin TEDA)
37	DF	CHN	Pan Ximing (loan return to Tianjin TEDA)
45	MF	CHN	Gong Qiule (loan to Wuhan Three Towns)
47	DF	CHN	Chen Yunhua (loan to Wuhan Three Towns)
61	DF	CHN	Luan Haodong (loan to Wuhan Three Towns)
-	MF	CHN	Yao Xuchen (loan to Inner Mongolia Zhongyou)
-	MF	CHN	Zhang Hui (loan to Wuhan Three Towns)
-	MF	CHN	Chen Ao (loan to Wuhan Zall)

=== Henan Jianye ===
In:

No.	Pos.	Nation	Player
2	DF	CHN	Guo Jing (loan from Guangzhou Evergrande Taobao)
9	FW	BRA	Henrique Dourado (loan return from (Brazil) Palmeiras)
14	MF	KOR	Kim Sung-hwan (from Liaoning Shenyang Urban)
20	MF	CHN	Feng Boxuan (loan from Guangzhou Evergrande Taobao)
22	MF	CHN	Song Boxuan (from Tianjin Tianhai)
41	FW	CHN	Abulahan Halike (Free Agent)
46	DF	CHN	Yang Chengyu (loan return from Hubei Chufeng Heli)
49	DF	CHN	Hu Kun (Free Agent)
-	DF	CHN	Liu Bin (from Chongqing Dangdai Lifan)
-	DF	CHN	Luo Xin (from Beijing Renhe)
-	GK	CHN	Wei Peng (loan return from Fujian Tianxin)
-	FW	CHN	Yan Hao (loan return from Inner Mongolia Caoshangfei)
-	DF	CHN	Li Xinze (loan return from Suzhou Dongwu)
-	GK	CHN	Pan Qihao (loan return from Inner Mongolia Caoshangfei)
-	MF	CHN	Song Hanchuan (loan return from Inner Mongolia Caoshangfei)
-	DF	CHN	Jin Qi (loan return from Inner Mongolia Caoshangfei)
-	DF	CHN	Chen Chengye (loan return from Inner Mongolia Caoshangfei)
-	DF	CHN	Xiong Meitao (loan return from Inner Mongolia Caoshangfei)
-	MF	CHN	Li Dongze (loan return from Inner Mongolia Caoshangfei)
-	DF	CHN	Huang Junjun (loan return from Inner Mongolia Caoshangfei)
-	DF	CHN	Dai Yuhan (loan return from Inner Mongolia Caoshangfei)

Out:

No.	Pos.	Nation	Player
1	GK	CHN	Wen Zhixiang (Released)
2	DF	CHN	Hu Ruibao (loan return to Guangzhou Evergrande Taobao)
6	MF	CHN	Feng Zhuoyi (to Chengdu Better City)
14	FW	CMR	Franck Ohandza (Released)
21	DF	CHN	Sui Donglu (Released)
22	DF	CHN	Long Wei (to Zhejiang Greentown)
35	MF	CHN	Li Benjian (Released)
62	DF	CHN	Luo Heng (Released)
-	FW	CHN	Chen Zijie (to Qinghai Oulu International)

=== Jiangsu Suning ===
In:

No.	Pos.	Nation	Player
12	MF	CHN	Zhang Xiaobin (loan return from Tianjin Tianhai)
16	MF	CHN	Gao Tianyi (loan return from Shenzhen F.C.)
29	DF	CHN	Zhang Cheng (from Tianjin Tianhai)
31	DF	CHN	Xie Xiaofan (loan return from Zibo Cuju)
33	MF	GHA	Mubarak Wakaso (from (Spain) Alavés)
-	GK	CHN	Li Haitao (loan return from Suzhou Dongwu)
-	MF	CHN	Yang Jiawei (loan return from Zibo Cuju)
-	DF	CHN	Liang Jinhu (loan return from Nanjing Shaye)
-	MF	CHN	Hu Zhifeng (loan return from Guangxi Baoyun)
-	FW	CHN	Erpan Ezimjan (loan return from Shaanxi Chang'an Athletic)
-	DF	CHN	Wang Xijie (loan return from Suzhou Dongwu)
-	MF	CHN	Liu Jianye (loan return from Guangzhou South China Tiger)
-	MF	CHN	Zhang Xinlin (loan return from Taizhou Yuanda)
-	DF	CHN	Li Shizhou (loan return from Taizhou Yuanda)
-	DF	KOR	Hong Jeong-ho (loan return from (South Korea) Jeonbuk Hyundai Motors)

Out:

No.	Pos.	Nation	Player
21	MF	CHN	He Chao (loan return to Guangzhou Evergrande Taobao)
25	DF	CHN	Long Cheng (to Zhejiang Greentown)
33	MF	CHN	Wang Song (to Sichuan Jiuniu)
40	MF	CHN	Ni Yin (loan to Taizhou Yuanda)
49	MF	CHN	Meng Zhen (loan to Beijing BSU)
53	MF	CHN	Nan Xiaoheng (to Sichuan Jiuniu)
60	DF	CHN	Cao Haiqing (loan to Kunshan F.C.)
-	MF	CHN	Yang Jiawei (loan to Qingdao Jonoon)
-	DF	CHN	Wang Xijie (to Kunshan F.C.)
-	MF	CHN	Liu Jianye (loan to Taizhou Yuanda)
-	MF	CHN	Zhang Xinlin (to Taizhou Yuanda)
-	DF	CHN	Li Shizhou (to Taizhou Yuanda)
-	DF	KOR	Hong Jeong-ho (to (South Korea) Jeonbuk Hyundai Motors)

=== Qingdao Huanghai ===
In:

No.	Pos.	Nation	Player
5	DF	CHN	Yan Zihao (from Tianjin Tianhai)
10	MF	FRA	Romain Alessandrini (from (United States) LA Galaxy)
13	MF	CHN	Wang Cheng (from Shanghai Shenxin)
14	FW	CHN	Wang Hao (from Liaoning F.C.)
15	MF	CHN	Wang Jianwen (from Beijing BSU)
17	MF	CHN	Zhou Junchen (loan from Shanghai Greenland Shenhua)
19	MF	CMR	Joseph Minala (loan from (Italy) Lazio)
21	MF	CHN	Wang Wei (loan from Shanghai Greenland Shenhua)
22	GK	CHN	Liu Zhenli (from Shandong Luneng Taishan)
25	DF	CHN	Zou Zheng (loan from Guangzhou R&F)
26	DF	SRB	Jagoš Vuković (from (Greece) Olympiacos)
27	FW	CHN	Zhu Jianrong (loan from Shanghai Greenland Shenhua)
29	MF	CHN	Ruan Zhexiang (from Liaoning F.C.)
44	MF	CHN	Ji Haoxiang (from Beijing Sinobo Guoan)
49	MF	CHN	Zhang Boling (from Beijing Sinobo Guoan)
50	DF	CHN	Zhang Haochen (from Shandong Luneng Taishan)
-	GK	CHN	Cao Guojun (from Taizhou Yuanda)

Out:

No.	Pos.	Nation	Player
5	MF	CHN	Zhang Jiaqi (loan return to Guangzhou Evergrande Taobao)
10	MF	ESP	Joan Verdú (Released)
15	MF	CHN	Zhang Zhen (to Qingdao Red Lions)
17	MF	CHN	Liu Long (to Qingdao Jonoon)
19	MF	CHN	Zhuang Jiajie (loan return to Hunan Billows)
24	MF	CIV	Yaya Touré (Released)
34	FW	POR	Ricardo Vaz Tê (to (Portugal) Portimonense)
36	GK	CHN	Peng Peng (loan return to Shanghai Greenland Shenhua)
46	MF	CHN	Su Zhenqun (to Suzhou Dongwu)

=== Shandong Luneng Taishan ===
In:

No.	Pos.	Nation	Player
4	DF	HUN	Tamás Kádár (from (Ukraine) Dynamo Kyiv)
7	FW	CHN	Guo Tianyu (loan return from Wuhan Zall)
8	MF	CHN	Yao Junsheng (loan return from Tianjin Tianhai)
20	FW	BRA	Leonardo (from Tianjin Tianhai)
29	FW	CHN	Liu Chaoyang (loan return from Sichuan Longfor)
41	GK	CHN	Sun Qihang (loan return from Zibo Cuju)
-	FW	CHN	Ji Shengpan (loan return from Zibo Cuju)
-	DF	CHN	Wang Jiong (loan return from Beijing BSU)
-	FW	CHN	Tian Yuda (loan return from Beijing BSU)
-	MF	CHN	Ma Shuai (loan return from (Brazil) Desportivo Brasil)
-	MF	CHN	Wu Xingyu (loan return from (Brazil) Desportivo Brasil)
-	FW	CHN	Bai Tianci (loan return from Kunshan F.C.)
-	DF	CHN	Tang Qirun (loan return from Yunnan Kunlu)
-	DF	CHN	Ou Li (loan return from Yunnan Kunlu)
-	FW	CHN	Feng Haotian (loan return from Yunnan Kunlu)
-	FW	CHN	Cheng Yuan (loan return from Zibo Cuju)

Out:

No.	Pos.	Nation	Player
1	GK	CHN	Liu Zhenli (to Qingdao Huanghai)
7	MF	CHN	Cui Peng (to Kunshan F.C.)
10	MF	CHN	Pedro Delgado (loan to (Portugal) Aves)
18	MF	CHN	Zhou Haibin (Retired)
45	DF	CHN	Chen Zhechao (loan to Guangzhou R&F)
47	MF	CHN	Luo Andong (loan to Beijing Renhe)
51	MF	CHN	Sun Rui (loan to Inner Mongolia Zhongyou)
53	MF	CHN	Xu Anbang (loan to Kunshan F.C.)
61	MF	CHN	Chen Pu (loan to Shijiazhuang Ever Bright)
64	DF	CHN	Li Songyi (loan to Guangzhou R&F)
65	MF	CHN	Yang Yilin (loan to Meizhou Hakka)
-	FW	CHN	Feng Haotian (to Inner Mongolia Zhongyou)
-	GK	CHN	Zhao Yang (to Suzhou Dongwu)
-	FW	CHN	Fang Hao (loan to Inner Mongolia Zhongyou)
-	DF	CHN	Zhang Haochen (to Qingdao Huanghai)
-	MF	CHN	Yi Xianlong (loan to Jiangxi Liansheng)
-	DF	CHN	Tai Jianfeng (to Taizhou Yuanda)
-	FW	CHN	Cheng Yuan (loan to Taizhou Yuanda)

=== Shanghai Greenland Shenhua ===
In:

No.	Pos.	Nation	Player
1	GK	CHN	Ma Zhen (from Tianjin Tianhai)
6	DF	CHN	Feng Xiaoting (loan from Guangzhou Evergrande Taobao)
9	FW	CHN	Yang Xu (from Tianjin Tianhai)
11	MF	CHN	Yu Hanchao (from Guangzhou Evergrande Taobao)
13	DF	CHN	Zhao Mingjian (from Dalian Professional)
17	FW	NGA	Obafemi Martins (Free Agent)
19	GK	CHN	Zeng Cheng (loan from Guangzhou Evergrande Taobao)
21	MF	CHN	Zhu Baojie (from Beijing Renhe)
26	MF	CHN	Qin Sheng (from Dalian Professional)
30	MF	CMR	Stéphane Mbia (from Wuhan Zall)
38	DF	CHN	Wen Jiabao (from Guangzhou Evergrande Taobao)
-	DF	CHN	Xu Yougang (loan return from Liaoning F.C.)
-	MF	CHN	Lü Pin (loan return from Suzhou Dongwu)
-	MF	CHN	Chen Tao (loan return from Jilin Baijia)
-	DF	CHN	Cao Chuanyu (loan return from Shanghai Shenxin)
-	MF	CHN	Xu Yue (loan return from Shanghai Shenxin)
-	GK	CHN	Peng Peng (loan return from Qingdao Huanghai)
-	FW	CHN	Sun Xipeng (loan return from Shanghai Shenxin)

Out:

No.	Pos.	Nation	Player
1	GK	CHN	Shen Jun (Released)
2	DF	CHN	Xu Yougang (loan to Zhejiang Yiteng)
6	DF	CHN	Li Peng (loan to Nantong Zhiyun)
7	MF	CHN	Wang Yongpo (to Shenzhen F.C.)
9	FW	NGA	Odion Ighalo (loan to (England) Manchester United)
12	GK	CHN	Chen Zhao (loan to Qingdao Jonoon)
15	FW	CHN	Zhu Jianrong (loan to Qingdao Huanghai)
17	FW	CHN	Wu Yizhen (loan to Wuhan Three Towns)
18	FW	CHN	Gao Di (loan to Changchun Yatai)
19	MF	CHN	Zhan Yilin (Released)
21	MF	CHN	Xu Haoyang (loan to Beijing BSU)
29	MF	CHN	Zhou Junchen (loan to Qingdao Huanghai)
31	MF	CHN	Wang Wei (loan to Qingdao Huanghai)
35	DF	CHN	Li Yang (loan return to (Portugal) Vitória)
36	MF	CHN	Liu Ruofan (loan to Tianjin TEDA)
39	MF	CHN	Cong Zhen (loan to Wuhan Zall)
41	FW	CHN	Mao Jianqing (Retired)
42	DF	CHN	Huang Linghao (Released)
44	DF	CHN	Gong Jinshuai (Released)
48	MF	CHN	Li Lianxiang (Released)
49	DF	CHN	Yan Xinyu (to Nantong Zhiyun)
51	MF	CHN	Liu Jiawei (Released)
52	DF	CHN	Deng Biao (to Shaanxi Chang'an Athletic)
53	MF	CHN	Xie Jinzheng (loan to Qingdao Jonoon)
55	GK	CHN	Li Yangxin (Released)
57	MF	CHN	Su Shihao (loan to Inner Mongolia Zhongyou)
58	MF	CHN	Sun Qinhan (loan to Beijing BSU)
59	MF	CHN	Xu Lei (loan to Inner Mongolia Zhongyou)
-	MF	CHN	Xu Yue (to Shenzhen F.C.)
-	GK	CHN	Peng Peng (to Kunshan F.C.)
-	FW	CHN	Sun Xipeng (loan to Qingdao Jonoon)

=== Shanghai SIPG ===
In:

No.	Pos.	Nation	Player
3	DF	CHN	Yu Rui (from Changchun Yatai)
9	DF	BRA	Ricardo Lopes Pereira (from (South Korea) Jeonbuk Hyundai Motors)
16	MF	CHN	Mirahmetjan Muzepper (from Tianjin TEDA)
-	FW	CHN	Huang Junyi (from Hubei Chufeng Heli)
-	MF	CHN	Wu Hang (loan return from Jilin Baijia)
-	MF	CHN	Sun Enming (loan return from Nantong Zhiyun)
-	MF	CHN	Zheng Zelong (loan return from Hangzhou Wuyue Qiantang)
-	DF	CHN	Zhang Yunkai (loan return from Hangzhou Wuyue Qiantang)
-	DF	CHN	Wei Lai (loan return from Nantong Zhiyun)
-	MF	CHN	Gong Chunjie (loan return from Kunshan F.C.)
-	MF	CHN	Wang Jiajie (loan return from Kunshan F.C.)

Out:

No.	Pos.	Nation	Player
12	FW	CHN	Li Haowen (loan to Suzhou Dongwu)
17	MF	CHN	Zhang Huachen (loan to Nantong Zhiyun)
19	FW	CHN	Hu Jinghang (loan to Wuhan Zall)
26	MF	CHN	Gao Haisheng (loan to Guizhou Hengfeng)
33	FW	CHN	Huang Zhenfei (loan to Inner Mongolia Zhongyou)
35	GK	CHN	Shi Xiaodong (loan to Nantong Zhiyun)
40	DF	CHN	Li Shenyuan (loan to Inner Mongolia Zhongyou)
52	MF	CHN	Zhang Zhen (loan to Beijing BSU)
55	DF	CHN	Zhu Jiayi (loan to Inner Mongolia Zhongyou)
58	MF	CHN	Zhou Zheng (loan to Inner Mongolia Zhongyou)
-	FW	CHN	Sun Guanou (loan to Inner Mongolia Zhongyou)
-	DF	CHN	Wei Lai (loan to Nantong Zhiyun)
-	MF	CHN	Gong Chunjie (to Kunshan F.C.)
-	MF	CHN	Wang Jiajie (to Kunshan F.C.)

=== Shenzhen F.C. ===
In:

No.	Pos.	Nation	Player
5	DF	KOR	Song Ju-hun (from Tianjin Tianhai)
6	MF	CHN	Pei Shuai (from Tianjin Tianhai)
7	MF	CHN	Zheng Dalun (from Tianjin Tianhai)
8	MF	HKG	Dai Wai Tsun (from (England) Wolverhampton Wanderers)
14	MF	CHN	Zhang Yuan (from Tianjin Tianhai)
17	MF	CHN	Liu Yue (from Tianjin Tianhai)
19	FW	CGO	Thievy Bifouma (from (Turkey) Yeni Malatyaspor)
20	MF	CHN	Sun Ke (from Tianjin Tianhai)
21	DF	CHN	Jiang Zhipeng (from Hebei China Fortune)
22	MF	CHN	Wang Yongpo (from Shanghai Greenland Shenhua)
25	DF	CHN	Mi Haolun (from Tianjin Tianhai)
29	FW	CHN	Gao Lin (from Guangzhou Evergrande Taobao)
56	DF	CHN	Xu Haofeng (from Tianjin Tianhai)
57	MF	CHN	Xu Yue (from Shanghai Greenland Shenhua)
59	DF	CHN	Huang Ruifeng (from Tianjin Tianhai)
-	FW	SUI	Blerim Džemaili (from (Italy) Bologna)
-	GK	CHN	Zhang Lu (from Tianjin Tianhai)
-	DF	CHN	Chen Guoliang (from (Spain) Los Garres)
-	DF	CHN	Liao Lei (from (Spain) Los Garres)
-	GK	CHN	Wang Zixiang (from Chongqing Dangdai Lifan)
-	FW	CHN	Nie Aoshuang (from Wuhan Zall)
-	FW	GAM	Pa Dibba (loan return from Shanghai Shenxin)
-	FW	BRA	Rossi (loan return from (Brazil) Vasco da Gama)

Out:

No.	Pos.	Nation	Player
13	DF	CHN	Wang Weilong (loan to Liaoning Shenyang Urban)
14	DF	SEN	Cheikh M'Bengue (Released)
20	MF	CHN	Xie Baoxian (to Guangxi Baoyun)
24	DF	CHN	Liu Yiming (loan return to Guangzhou Evergrande Taobao)
25	MF	CHN	Wang Peng (loan to Shijiazhuang Ever Bright)
29	DF	CHN	Wang Dalong (loan to Taizhou Yuanda)
33	MF	CHN	Gao Tianyi (loan return to Jiangsu Suning)
40	FW	POR	Dyego Sousa (loan to (Portugal) Benfica)
41	MF	CHN	Shi Yiyi (loan to Qingdao Jonoon)
42	DF	CHN	Yeljan Shinar (loan to Beijing BSU)
57	GK	CHN	Wei Jian (Released)
61	MF	CHN	Liang Yu (Released)
62	GK, DF	CHN	Qiu Kebei (Released)
-	FW	GAM	Pa Dibba (to (Turkey) Adana Demirspor)
-	FW	BRA	Rossi (to (Brazil) Bahia)

=== Shijiazhuang Ever Bright ===
In:

No.	Pos.	Nation	Player
1	GK	CHN	Zhang Zhenqiang (from Liaoning F.C.)
8	MF	BRA	Rômulo (from (Brazil) Flamengo)
9	FW	COD	Oscar Maritu (from Shaanxi Chang'an Athletic)
13	DF	ZAM	Stoppila Sunzu (from (France) Metz)
15	MF	CHN	Wang Peng (loan from Shenzhen F.C.)
19	DF	CHN	Liao Chengjian (from Heilongjiang Lava Spring)
21	MF	CHN	Chen Pu (loan from Shandong Luneng Taishan)
28	MF	CHN	Deng Yubiao (loan from Guangzhou Evergrande Taobao)
29	GK	CHN	Han Feng (from Guangzhou R&F)
30	DF	CHN	Ma Chongchong (from Sichuan Longfor)
41	GK	CHN	Lu Hantao (from Tianjin Tianhai)
42	MF	CHN	Sun Xuelong (from Tianjin Tianhai)
44	GK	CHN	Sun Jianxiang (from (Spain) Racing Rioja)
45	MF	CHN	Zhang Aokai (from (Spain) Espanyol B)
46	FW	CHN	Wang Jinze (loan from Guangzhou Evergrande Taobao)
-	MF	CHN	Wang Hongyu (loan return from Zhejiang Yiteng)

Out:

No.	Pos.	Nation	Player
2	FW	CHN	Zhang Shuai (to Beijing BSU)
5	DF	CHN	Wu Haoran (Released)
8	MF	CHN	Li Chunyu (Released)
9	FW	BOL	Marcelo Moreno (to (Brazil) Cruzeiro)
13	MF	CHN	Feng Shaoshun (Released)
16	DF	CHN	Jiao Zhe (to Beijing Renhe)
18	MF	CHN	Wei Jingzong (to Zhejiang Greentown)
26	DF	CHN	An Shuo (Released)
29	GK	CHN	Zhang Yinuo (to Chengdu Better City)
35	MF	CHN	Guo Sheng (Released)
60	MF	CHN	Guo Song (to Guangxi Baoyun)
-	MF	CHN	Wang Hongyu (Released)

=== Tianjin TEDA ===
In:

No.	Pos.	Nation	Player
4	DF	CHN	Lei Tenglong (from Beijing Sinobo Guoan)
8	FW	CHN	Xiao Zhi (from Guangzhou R&F)
14	DF	CHN	Rong Hao (loan from Guangzhou Evergrande Taobao)
16	MF	CHN	Liu Ruofan (loan from Shanghai Greenland Shenhua)
23	DF	CHN	Qian Yumiao (from Tianjin Tianhai)
26	MF	CHN	Che Shiwei (from Hebei China Fortune)
33	DF	CHN	Song Yue (from Nantong Zhiyun)
-	DF	CHN	Liao Bochao (loan return from Xi'an Yilian)
-	FW	CHN	Zhou Liao (loan return from Yinchuan Helanshan)
-	DF	CHN	Pan Ximing (loan return from Hebei China Fortune)

Out:

No.	Pos.	Nation	Player
4	DF	CHN	Yang Fan (to Beijing Sinobo Guoan)
9	FW	GER	Sandro Wagner (Retired)
14	DF	CHN	Rong Hao (loan return to Guangzhou Evergrande Taobao)
16	DF	CHN	Peng Rui (to Sichuan Everglory)
23	FW	CHN	Lei Yongchi (to Zhejiang Yiteng)
25	MF	CHN	Mirahmetjan Muzepper (to Shanghai SIPG)
26	DF	CHN	Cao Yang (Retired)
43	MF	CHN	Guo Zhenquan (to Sichuan Everglory)
53	MF	CHN	Li Zhenqin (to Beijing Sinobo Guoan)
54	MF	CHN	Liu Yaoxin (loan to Beijing Renhe)
62	DF	CHN	Zhou Qiming (to Sichuan Everglory)
-	MF	CHN	Chen Guokang (to Meizhou Hakka)
-	FW	CHN	Zhou Liao (to Wuhan Three Towns)
-	DF	CHN	Pan Ximing (to Hebei China Fortune)

=== Wuhan Zall ===
In:

No.	Pos.	Nation	Player
12	DF	CHN	Liu Shangkun (from Liaoning F.C.)
19	FW	CHN	Hu Jinghang (loan from Shanghai SIPG)
25	MF	FRA	Eddy Gnahoré (loan from (France) Amiens)
29	DF	CHN	Zhang Chenglin (loan from Guangzhou Evergrande Taobao)
30	DF	POR	Daniel Carriço (from (Spain) Sevilla)
39	MF	CHN	Cong Zhen (loan from Shanghai Greenland Shenhua)
41	MF	CHN	Chen Ao (loan from Hebei China Fortune)
-	FW	CHN	Kang Zhenjie (loan return from Jiangxi Liansheng)

Out:

No.	Pos.	Nation	Player
19	FW	CHN	Nie Aoshuang (to Shenzhen F.C.)
25	MF	CMR	Stéphane Mbia (to Shanghai Greenland Shenhua)
31	MF	CHN	Chen Ao (loan return to Hebei China Fortune)
33	FW	CHN	Chang Feiya (loan return to Guangzhou R&F)
35	DF	CHN	Chen Yuhao (loan return to Zhejiang Yiteng)
40	FW	CHN	Guo Tianyu (loan return to Shandong Luneng Taishan)
44	FW	CHN	Lin Xin (to Hebei Aoli Jingying)
-	MF	CHN	Huang Xiyang (to Chongqing Dangdai Lifan)
-	MF	CHN	Zhang Yang (to Taizhou Yuanda)
-	FW	CHN	Kang Zhenjie (to Jiangxi Liansheng)

== League One ==
=== Beijing BSU ===
In:

No.	Pos.	Nation	Player
2	MF	CHN	Zhang Zhen (loan from Shanghai SIPG)
3	DF	CHN	Zhang Ran (from Beijing Sinobo Guoan)
4	DF	CHN	Yeljan Shinar (loan from Shenzhen F.C.)
5	FW	CHN	Zhang Shuai (from Shijiazhuang Ever Bright)
6	DF	CHN	Anizirjan Askar (loan from Guangzhou Evergrande Taobao)
8	FW	CHN	Li Ming (loan from Guangzhou Evergrande Taobao)
9	FW	CHN	Gong Zheng (loan return from Suzhou Dongwu)
10	MF	CHN	Tang Shi (loan from Guangzhou Evergrande Taobao)
11	MF	CHN	Meng Zhen (loan from Jiangsu Suning)
18	MF	CHN	Xu Haoyang (loan from Shanghai Greenland Shenhua)
19	FW	NGA	John Owoeri (from Shaanxi Chang'an Athletic)
21	MF	CHN	Bu Xin (from Guangdong South China Tiger)
23	MF	CHN	Zhou Xincheng (from Beijing Sinobo Guoan)
28	MF	CHN	Peng Junxian (from Guangzhou Evergrande Taobao)
29	DF	CHN	Huang Wei (from Sichuan Longfor)
30	MF	CHN	Sun Qinhan (loan from Shanghai Greenland Shenhua)
35	MF	CHN	Wei Chaolun (loan return from Suzhou Dongwu)
-	GK	CHN	Huang Weibo (from Beijing Sinobo Guoan)
-	MF	CHN	Song Yi (loan return from Beijing BIT)
-	DF	CHN	Jia Hongnian (loan return from Beijing BIT)

Out:

No.	Pos.	Nation	Player
3	DF	CHN	Wang Jiong (loan return to Shandong Luneng Taishan)
7	MF	CHN	Lü Zheng (Retired)
8	MF	CHN	Wang Jianwen (to Qingdao Huanghai)
9	FW	BRA	Lins (Released)
11	FW	CIV	Gerard Gohou (to (Turkey) Kasımpaşa)
13	FW	ECU	Juan Luis Anangonó (Released)
16	MF	CHN	Deng Zhuoxiang (to Wuhan Three Towns)
18	MF	CHN	Yang Yun (Released)
19	FW	CHN	Li Xiang (to Zhejiang Yiteng)
21	FW	CHN	Liang Xueming (to Meizhou Hakka)
23	DF	CHN	Chen Zepeng (loan return to Guangzhou Evergrande Taobao)
26	DF	CHN	Cui Zhongkai (Released)
29	MF	CHN	Han Yi (Released)
30	MF	CHN	Yao Xuchen (loan return to Hebei China Fortune)
32	FW	CHN	Tian Yuda (loan return to Shandong Luneng Taishan)
60	DF	CHN	Yao Liang (Released)

=== Beijing Renhe ===
In:

No.	Pos.	Nation	Player
6	MF	CHN	Jin Chengjun (from Yanbian Beiguo)
9	MF	CHN	Yu Wenhe (from Guangdong Southern Tigers)
11	MF	CHN	Zhang Wenzhao (loan from Guangzhou Evergrande Taobao)
13	DF	CHN	Liu Xiangwei (loan return from Heilongjiang Lava Spring)
14	MF	CHN	Liu Yaoxin (loan from Tianjin TEDA)
15	DF	CHN	Shi Jiwei (from Guangdong Southern Tigers)
16	GK	CHN	Zhu Zilin (from Inner Mongolia Zhongyou)
20	FW	AUS	Daniel Wong (Free Agent)
21	MF	CHN	Liu Yingchen (loan from Dalian Pro)
23	MF	CHN	Luo Andong (loan from Shandong Luneng Taishan)
25	DF	CHN	Jiao Zhe (from Shijiazhuang Ever Bright)
27	FW	BRA	Tiago Leonço (loan from R&F (Hong Kong))
31	DF	CHN	Yang Zhaohui (from Guangzhou Evergrande Taobao)
37	FW	CHN	Hou Zhe (from Hebei Aoli Jingying)
-	MF	CHN	Chen Liming (loan return from Heilongjiang Lava Spring)
-	GK	CHN	Xu Jiamin (loan return from Heilongjiang Lava Spring)

Out:

No.	Pos.	Nation	Player
4	DF	CHN	Luo Xin (to Henan Jianye)
6	MF	CHN	Zhang Wenzhao (loan return to Guangzhou Evergrande Taobao)
7	FW	KEN	Ayub Masika (loan to (England) Reading)
8	MF	ARG	Augusto Fernández (to (Spain) Cádiz)
9	FW	SEN	Makhete Diop (to (Saudi Arabia) Al-Shabab)
10	MF	NGA	Sone Aluko (loan return to (England) Reading)
11	MF	CHN	Zhu Baojie (to Shanghai Greenland Shenhua)
13	FW	CHN	Shi Liang (to Meizhou Hakka)
14	MF	CHN	Wang Xuanhong (to Guizhou Hengfeng)
15	MF	CHN	Chen Jie (to Chongqing Dangdai Lifan)
19	GK	CHN	Liu Peng (loan to Heilongjiang Lava Spring)
22	FW	GHA	Elvis Manu (to (Bulgaria) Ludogorets Razgrad)
23	GK	CHN	Mou Pengfei (to Liaoning Shenyang Urban)
31	MF	CHN	Rao Weihui (to Changchun Yatai)
32	DF	CHN	Zhang Chenlong (loan return to Guangzhou R&F)
37	FW	CHN	Yang Yihu (to Meizhou Hakka)
56	MF	CHN	Shi Ming (to Heilongjiang Lava Spring)
-	DF	CHN	Chen Zifeng (to Heilongjiang Lava Spring)
-	MF	CHN	Chen Liming (loan to Heilongjiang Lava Spring)
-	GK	CHN	Xu Jiamin (to Dalian Pro)

=== Changchun Yatai ===
In:

No.	Pos.	Nation	Player
1	GK	CHN	Ci Henglong (from Heilongjiang Lava Spring)
2	DF	CHN	Zhang Zijian (from Beijing Sinobo Guoan)
4	DF	CHN	Zhang Yu (loan from Beijing Sinobo Guoan)
8	MF	BRA	Lucas Souza (from (Cyprus) APOEL)
9	FW	CHN	Gao Di (loan from Shanghai Greenland Shenhua)
10	MF	BRA	Serginho (from (Japan) Kashima Antlers)
15	MF	CHN	Dilyimit Tudi (from Guangzhou Evergrande Taobao)
17	MF	TPE	Chen Po-liang (from Zhejiang Greentown)
18	DF	CHN	Wang Jie (from Tianjin Tianhai)
25	FW	NGA	Aaron Samuel (from Sichuan Longfor)
31	MF	CHN	Rao Weihui (from Beijing Renhe)
56	DF	CHN	Huang Ruifeng (loan from Shenzhen F.C.)
-	DF	CHN	Li Xiaoming (loan return from Nantong Zhiyun)
-	MF	CHN	Wang Jinliang (loan return from Jiangsu Yancheng Dingli)
-	DF	CHN	Zhang Wenjun (loan return from Jiangsu Yancheng Dingli)

Out:

No.	Pos.	Nation	Player
3	DF	CHN	Ren Peng (loan to Zhejiang Yiteng)
4	DF	CHN	Yu Rui (to Shanghai SIPG)
7	FW	BRA	Maurides (to (South Korea) FC Anyang)
9	FW	NED	Richairo Zivkovic (loan to (England) Sheffield United)
33	DF	CHN	Zhang Xiaofei (Retired)
44	MF	CHN	Yang Ailong (to Liaoning Shenyang Urban)
61	DF	CHN	Zhu Mingxin (loan to Jiangxi Liansheng)

=== Chengdu Better City ===
In:

No.	Pos.	Nation	Player
6	MF	CHN	Feng Zhuoyi (from Henan Jianye)
7	MF	CHN	Zhang Jingyang (from Sichuan Longfor)
10	FW	SRB	Nikola Đurđić (from (Sweden) Hammarby IF)
13	DF	CHN	Hu Yongfa (from Guangdong South China Tiger)
16	GK	CHN	Zhang Yinuo (from Shijiazhuang Ever Bright)
21	MF	ESP	Dani Quintana (from (Azerbaijan) Qarabağ)
25	MF	CHN	Wu Guichao (from Guangdong South China Tiger)
33	DF	CHN	Chu Jinzhao (from Tianjin Tianhai)
34	MF	CHN	Wang Xiaolong (from Tianjin Tianhai)
39	FW	BRA	Naldinho (from Xinjiang Tianshan Leopard)
42	DF	CHN	Luo Xin (from (Belgium) Tubize)
43	MF	CHN	Meng Junjie (Free Agent)
44	MF	CHN	Zhang Yitao (Free Agent)
45	DF	CHN	Liu Xing (from Guangdong South China Tiger)
47	MF	CHN	He Xin (from Guangzhou Evergrande Taobao)
-	MF	CHN	Mu Yiming (from (Belgium) Tubize)
-	MF	CHN	Wang Haile (from Fujian Tianxin)

Out:

No.	Pos.	Nation	Player

=== Guizhou Hengfeng ===
In:

No.	Pos.	Nation	Player
3	DF	CHN	Lin Jiahao (from Shanghai Shenxin)
9	FW	CHN	Gui Hong (loan from Guangzhou R&F)
11	MF	ALB	Jahmir Hyka (from (Israel) Sektzia Nes Tziona)
23	MF	CHN	Wang Xuanhong (from Beijing Renhe)
24	DF	CHN	Zhang Shengbin (from Hebei Aoli Jingying)
27	DF	CHN	Liu Hao (from Sichuan Longfor)
34	MF	CHN	Gao Haisheng (loan from Shanghai SIPG)
39	MF	CHN	Fan Yunlong (loan from Guangzhou R&F)
-	FW	SRB	Stefan Mihajlović (from (Serbia) FK Radnički Niš)
-	GK	CHN	Liu Chang (loan return from Qingdao Red Lions)
-	DF	CIV	Kévin Boli (loan return from (Romania) CFR Cluj)

Out:

No.	Pos.	Nation	Player
1	GK	CHN	Su Boyang (Released)
3	DF	HKG	Festus Baise (Retired)
10	FW	CRO	Nikica Jelavić (to (Croatia) NK Lokomotiva)
23	DF	CHN	Tang Yuan (Retired)
61	FW	CHN	Shuang Bijia (to Yunnan Kunlu)
-	DF	CIV	Kévin Boli (to (Romania) CFR Cluj)

=== Heilongjiang Lava Spring ===
In:

No.	Pos.	Nation	Player
9	FW	CHN	Yan Peng (from Shenzhen Pengcheng)
23	MF	CHN	Lin Tingxuan (from Liaoning F.C.)
26	MF	CHN	Chen Liming (loan from Beijing Renhe)
29	DF	CHN	Sun Yifan (from Shanghai Shenxin)
30	GK	CHN	Liu Peng (loan from Beijing Renhe)
35	GK	CHN	Chen Chang (to Heilongjiang Lava Spring)
36	DF	CHN	Yu Xiang (from Qingdao Jonoon)
57	MF	CHN	Shi Ming (from Beijing Renhe)
58	DF	CHN	Chen Zifeng (from Beijing Renhe)
-	GK	CHN	Sun Yunlong (from Yinchuan Helanshan)
-	FW	CHN	Wang Yida (loan return from Guangxi Baoyun)

Out:

No.	Pos.	Nation	Player
6	DF	CHN	Liao Chengjian (to Shijiazhuang Ever Bright)
21	MF	CHN	Tan Liwei (to Qingdao Jonoon)
23	GK	CHN	Xu Jiamin (loan return to Beijing Renhe)
26	MF	CHN	Chen Liming (loan return to Beijing Renhe)
27	FW	NGA	Daniel Chima Chukwu (loan return to (Norway) Molde)
29	MF	CHN	Lin Kun (Released)
30	GK	CHN	Liu Kun (Released)
33	DF	CHN	Wang Boren (Released)
35	MF	BRA	Victor Bolt (to (Brazil) Botafogo FC)
36	DF	CHN	Liu Xiangwei (loan return to Beijing Renhe)
57	GK	CHN	Ci Henglong (to Changchun Yatai)

=== Inner Mongolia Zhongyou ===
In:

No.	Pos.	Nation	Player
1	GK	CHN	Geng Xiaofeng (loan from Hebei China Fortune)
2	MF	CHN	Su Shihao (loan from Shanghai Greenland Shenhua)
11	FW	CHN	Huang Zhenfei (loan from Shanghai SIPG)
12	DF	CHN	Li Shenyuan (loan from Shanghai SIPG)
16	MF	CHN	Xu Lei (loan from Shanghai Greenland Shenhua)
18	FW	CHN	Sun Guanou (loan from Shanghai SIPG)
19	MF	CHN	Yao Xuchen (loan from Hebei China Fortune)
24	DF	CHN	Zhu Jiayi (loan from Shanghai SIPG)
26	DF	CHN	Wang Wenxuan (loan from Guangzhou Evergrande Taobao)
30	DF	CHN	Chen Quanjiang (loan from Guangzhou Evergrande Taobao)
32	GK	CHN	Mai Gaoling (loan from Guangzhou Evergrande Taobao)
34	MF	CHN	Ma Yilun (loan from Guangzhou Evergrande Taobao)
35	FW	CHN	Fang Hao (loan from Shandong Luneng Taishan)
36	MF	CHN	Zhou Zheng (loan from Shanghai SIPG)
38	MF	CHN	Sun Rui (loan from Shandong Luneng Taishan)
51	MF	CHN	Fan Hengbo (loan from Guangzhou Evergrande Taobao)
52	MF	CHN	Zhang Zheng (loan from Guangzhou Evergrande Taobao)
53	FW	CHN	Seydar Siyitjan (loan from Guangzhou Evergrande Taobao)
54	FW	CHN	Zhang Xiaotian (from Chongqing Dangdai Lifan)
55	FW	CHN	Feng Haotian (from Shandong Luneng Taishan)

Out:

No.	Pos.	Nation	Player
1	GK	CHN	Liu Weiguo (loan return to Guangzhou Evergrande Taobao)
2	FW	CHN	Wang Jinze (loan return to Guangzhou Evergrande Taobao)
9	MF	CHN	Liu Yue (loan return to Tianjin Tianhai)
10	FW	SEN	Babacar Gueye (Released)
11	MF	CHN	Exmetjan Ekber (Released)
12	DF	CHN	Guo Jing (loan return to Guangzhou Evergrande Taobao)
16	GK	CHN	Zhu Zilin (to Beijing Renhe)
18	DF	CHN	Mirdan Ablikim (to Xinjiang Tianshan Leopard)
29	GK	CHN	Han Fangteng (Retired)
41	GK	CHN	Chen Chang (to Heilongjiang Lava Spring)

=== Jiangxi Liansheng ===
In:

No.	Pos.	Nation	Player
2	DF	CHN	Zhu Mingxin (loan from Changchun Yatai)
4	DF	CHN	Zhao Yibo (from Guangdong South China Tiger)
7	MF	CHN	Shang Yin (from Sichuan Longfor)
8	FW	CHN	Zhang Ye (from Liaoning F.C.)
11	MF	CHN	Li Xiaoting (from Sichuan Longfor)
22	DF	HKG	Andy Russell (loan from Hebei China Fortune)
24	GK	CHN	Mu Qianyu (from Liaoning F.C.)
26	DF	CHN	Liu Yuchen (from Zhejiang Yiteng)
33	FW	CHN	Kang Zhenjie (from Wuhan Zall)
34	GK	CHN	Zhu Jiaqi (from Yinchuan Helanshan)
37	MF	CHN	Yi Xianlong (from Shandong Luneng Taishan)
39	MF	CHN	Zhang Yanjun (from Liaoning F.C.)
41	MF	CHN	Xu Yue (loan from Shenzhen F.C.)
42	MF	CHN	Wu Minfeng (from Guangdong South China Tiger)
-	DF	CHN	Zhou Yuye (from (Japan) Mito HollyHock)
-	FW	TUR	Okan Aydın (from Austria Klagenfurt)

Out:

No.	Pos.	Nation	Player
33	FW	CHN	Kang Zhenjie (loan return to Wuhan Zall)

=== Kunshan F.C. ===
In:

No.	Pos.	Nation	Player
2	DF	CHN	Wang Xijie (from Jiangsu Suning)
3	DF	CHN	Cao Haiqing (loan from Jiangsu Suning)
5	MF	CHN	Cui Peng (from Shandong Luneng Taishan)
7	MF	PER	Roberto Siucho (loan from Guangzhou Evergrande Taobao)
8	FW	CHN	Wu Yufan (from Suzhou Dongwu)
13	GK	CHN	Peng Peng (from Shanghai Greenland Shenhua)
18	MF	CHN	Wang Jiajie (from Shanghai SIPG)
21	MF	CHN	Abduwahap Aniwar (from Guangzhou Evergrande Taobao)
23	DF	CHN	Liu Ruicheng (from Guangzhou Evergrande Taobao)
25	FW	NGA	Tunde Adeniji (from (Hungary) Debrecen)
26	MF	CHN	Liu Yi (from Tianjin Tianhai)
28	DF	BRA	Bruno Pires (from (Portugal) Vitória Setúbal)
31	MF	CPV	Hildeberto Pereira (from (Portugal) Vitória Setúbal)
32	MF	CHN	Xu Anbang (loan from Shandong Luneng Taishan)
35	MF	CHN	Gong Chunjie (from Shanghai SIPG)

Out:

No.	Pos.	Nation	Player
3	DF	CHN	Yu Jiawei (to Liaoning Shenyang Urban)
14	MF	CHN	Zhong Jiajie (Released)
18	MF	CHN	Wang Jiajie (loan return to Shanghai SIPG)
24	DF	CHN	Li Zhiyu (Released)
31	MF	CHN	Luo Jiacheng (Released)
33	DF	CHN	Qian Ziwei (Released)
35	MF	CHN	Gong Chunjie (loan return to Shanghai SIPG)
36	FW	CHN	Bai Tianci (loan return to Shandong Luneng)
37	FW	CHN	Wang Chuqi (loan return to Jiangsu Suning)
38	DF	CHN	Xia Xicheng (loan return to Zibo Cuju)
41	DF	CHN	Cai Mingmin (loan return to Guangzhou Evergrande)

=== Liaoning Shenyang Urban ===
In:

No.	Pos.	Nation	Player
2	DF	CHN	Yu Jiawei (from Kunshan F.C.)
4	DF	CHN	Liu Jiaxin (from Shaanxi Chang'an Athletic)
5	DF	CHN	Ji Zhengyu (from Sichuan Longfor)
6	MF	CHN	Yang Ailong (from Changchun Yatai)
12	GK	CHN	Mou Pengfei (from Beijing Renhe)
14	MF	CHN	Qu Xiaohui (from Dalian Chanjoy)
15	MF	CHN	Gui Zihan (Free Agent)
19	FW	CHN	Wang Jingbin (loan from Guangzhou Evergrande Taobao)
20	DF	UZB	Islom Tukhtakhujaev (from (Uzbekistan) Lokomotiv Tashkent)
28	DF	CHN	Shi Chuansheng (from Sichuan Longfor)
29	DF	CHN	Li Zhen (from Liaoning F.C.)
30	FW	CGO	Juvhel Tsoumou (from (Romania) FCSB)
31	MF	CHN	Li Hengjun (from Liaoning F.C.)
-	MF	CHN	Chen Jingfan (from Liaoning F.C.)
-	DF	CHN	Wang Weilong (loan from Shenzhen F.C.)
-	MF	KOR	Kim Sung-hwan (from (Thailand) Port)

Out:

No.	Pos.	Nation	Player
4	DF	CHN	Wang Weipu (to Shaanxi Chang'an Athletic)
5	DF	CHN	Liu Yangyang (to Qingdao Jonoon)
29	DF	CHN	Liu Wenqing (to Qingdao Jonoon)
-	MF	KOR	Kim Sung-hwan (to Henan Jianye)

=== Meizhou Hakka ===
In:

No.	Pos.	Nation	Player
3	DF	CHN	Li Junfeng (from (Portugal) Padroense)
5	DF	HKG	Leung Nok Hang (from (Hong Kong) R&F)
8	FW	CHN	Liang Xueming (from Beijing BSU)
10	FW	GUI	Lonsana Doumbouya (from (Thailand) Trat)
11	FW	NGA	Chisom Egbuchulam (from (South Korea) Suwon FC)
13	FW	CHN	Shi Liang (from Beijing Renhe)
17	FW	CHN	Yang Yihu (from Beijing Renhe)
25	DF	CHN	Xiao Zhen (from Sichuan Longfor)
28	MF	CHN	Yang Yilin (loan from Shandong Luneng Taishan)
32	FW	CHN	Zhou Bingxu (from Lhasa Urban Construction Investment)
37	MF	CHN	Chen Guokang (from Tianjin TEDA)
48	GK	CHN	Chen Zhongyu (from Dalian Pro)
-	DF	CHN	Luo Xi (loan return from Shenzhen Pengcheng)
-	MF	CHN	Zhang Zhiquan (loan return from Shenzhen Pengcheng)
-	MF	CHN	Tang Hai (loan return from Shenzhen Pengcheng)
-	DF	CHN	Xiong Zexuan (loan return from Shenzhen Pengcheng)

Out:

No.	Pos.	Nation	Player
2	DF	HKG	Tsui Wang Kit (to (Hong Kong) R&F)
11	DF	CHN	Zhang Hongjiang (Released)
23	MF	SRB	Lazar Arsić (to (South Korea) Seoul E-Land)

=== Nantong Zhiyun ===
In:

No.	Pos.	Nation	Player
2	DF	CHN	Huang Jiaqiang (from Sichuan Longfor)
3	DF	CHN	Wei Lai (loan from Shanghai SIPG)
5	DF	CHN	Li Peng (loan from Shanghai Greenland Shenhua)
7	MF	CHN	Zhang Huachen (loan from Shanghai SIPG)
10	MF	CHN	Xu Junmin (from Shanghai Shenxin)
11	FW	BRA	Mychell Chagas (from (Switzerland) Grasshopper)
23	GK	CHN	Shi Xiaodong (loan from Shanghai SIPG)
24	DF	CHN	Li Hao (loan return from Hangzhou Wuyue Qiantang)
25	DF	CHN	Yan Xinyu (from Shanghai Greenland Shenhua)
27	MF	CHN	David Wang (loan from (England) Wolverhampton Wanderers)
33	DF	CHN	Geng Xianglong (from Shanghai Shenxin)
36	MF	CHN	Chu Chentao (from Shanghai Shenxin)
43	MF	CHN	Liu Wenfei (from Shanghai Shenxin)
46	MF	CHN	Shen Wei (from Shanghai Shenxin)
47	DF	CHN	Song Haoyu (from Shanghai Shenxin)
-	FW	CHN	Wang Si (loan return from Hangzhou Wuyue Qiantang)

Out:

No.	Pos.	Nation	Player
2	DF	CHN	Wei Lai (loan return to Shanghai SIPG)
5	DF	CHN	Song Yue (to Tianjin TEDA)
9	FW	CMR	Anatole Abang (to (Moldova) Sheriff Tiraspol)
10	MF	CMR	Marius Obekop (Released)
13	DF	CHN	Zhai Zhaoyu (Released)
14	DF	CHN	Li Xiaoming (loan return to Changchun Yatai)
33	MF	CHN	Sun Enming (loan return to Shanghai SIPG)
37	DF	CHN	Hu Ming (to Beijing BIT)
41	FW	CHN	Fan Zhiqiang (Released)
-	MF	CHN	Huang Cong (loan to Nanjing Fengfan)

=== Shaanxi Chang'an Athletic ===
In:

No.	Pos.	Nation	Player
4	DF	CHN	Wang Weipu (from Shenyang Urban)
8	DF	CHN	Deng Biao (from Shanghai Greenland Shenhua)
10	FW	NGA	Kingsley Onuegbu (from (Cyprus) Nea Salamis Famagusta)
12	MF	CHN	Han Guanghui (from Zibo Cuju)
16	DF	TPE	Wang Chien-ming (from (South Korea) Gwangju)
21	MF	CHN	Zhang Yuxuan (from (Portugal) Vilar De Perdizes)
23	MF	CMR	Raoul Loé (from (Cyprus) Omonia)
38	MF	CHN	Wen Wubin (from Sichuan Longfor)
43	DF	CHN	Chen Hongwei (from Liaoning F.C.)
45	FW	CHN	Gao Kanghao (from Guangdong South China Tiger)
57	DF	CHN	Yang Peng (from Yinchuan Helanshan)
-	FW	CMR	Robert Tambe (from (Romania) CFR Cluj)

Out:

No.	Pos.	Nation	Player
6	MF	CHN	Yan Feng (Retired)
10	FW	COD	Oscar Maritu (to Shijiazhuang Ever Bright)
30	FW	NGA	John Owoeri (to Beijing BSU)
37	FW	CHN	Erpan Ezimjan (loan return to Jiangsu Suning)
38	MF	CHN	Huang Haiwei (loan return to Beijing Sinobo Guoan)
49	MF	CHN	Xiao Zhihua (Released)
65	DF	CHN	Liu Jiaxin (to Liaoning Shenyang Urban)

=== Sichuan Jiuniu ===
In:

No.	Pos.	Nation	Player
4	MF	CHN	Wang Qiao (from Liaoning F.C.)
6	MF	CHN	Li Haojie (from Yanbian Beiguo)
9	MF	CHN	Nan Xiaoheng (from Jiangsu Suning)
13	DF	CHN	Wang Qi (from Sichuan Longfor)
14	MF	FRA	Jules Iloki (from (Romania) Concordia Chiajna)
17	MF	CHN	Li Jiahe (from Liaoning F.C.)
19	FW	GUI	Mohamed Yattara (from (France) Auxerre)
22	MF	CHN	Xiao Kun (from Suzhou Dongwu)
27	GK	CHN	Yang Chao (from Guangdong South China Tiger)
28	FW	CHN	Xia Dalong (from Baoding Yingli ETS)
29	MF	CHN	Zhang Jiaqi (from Guangzhou Evergrande Taobao)
31	DF	CHN	Lü Wei (from Liaoning F.C.)
32	DF	CHN	Song Chen (from Liaoning F.C.)
33	MF	CHN	Wang Song (from Jiangsu Suning)
40	DF	SRB	Nemanja Vidić (from (Serbia) Inđija)
41	MF	CHN	Zheng Shengxiong (loan from Guangzhou Evergrande Taobao)
-	GK	CHN	Lu Zheyu (from Baoding Yingli ETS)
-	MF	CHN	Tan Yang (from (Portugal) Vizela)
-	DF	CHN	Huang Zhun (loan return from Qingdao Jonoon)

Out:

No.	Pos.	Nation	Player
4	MF	CHN	Wang Qiao (loan return to Liaoning F.C.)
5	DF	CHN	Zhang Jiawei (Released)
7	MF	CHN	Chen Zhuo (Released)
19	GK	CHN	Jin Wenxin (Released)
26	FW	CHN	Liu Yang (loan return to Guangdong South China Tiger)
29	MF	CHN	Yu Di (Released)
32	DF	CHN	Yang Junjie (loan return to Guangdong South China Tiger)
33	DF	CHN	Hao Shuang (Released)
39	MF	CHN	Tan Yang (loan return to (Portugal) Vizela)

=== Suzhou Dongwu ===
In:

No.	Pos.	Nation	Player
2	DF	CHN	Ma Hongqi (Free Agent)
3	DF	CHN	Huang Chao (from Sichuan Longfor)
9	FW	NGA	Haruna Garba (from (Hungary) Debrecen)
10	MF	CHN	Chen Zhongliu (from Chongqing Dangdai Lifan)
15	MF	CHN	Wang Congming (from Beijing Sinobo Guoan)
18	FW	CHN	Wu Linfeng (loan from Hebei Aoli Jingying)
19	FW	NGA	Chris Shimbayev (loan from (Nigeria) Galaxy Sports Academy)
20	MF	CHN	Abbas'haji Awut (from Xinjiang Tianshan Leopard)
23	MF	CHN	Xu Zhaoji (from Lhasa UCI)
24	FW	CHN	Dai Yonghao (Free Agent)
28	FW	CHN	Li Haowen (loan from Shanghai SIPG)
32	MF	CHN	Su Zhenqun (from Qingdao Huanghai)
33	GK	CHN	Zhao Yang (from Shandong Luneng Taishan)
-	DF	CHN	Li Minhui (loan return from Jiangsu Yancheng Dingli)

Out:

No.	Pos.	Nation	Player
2	DF	CHN	Wang Xijie (loan return to Jiangsu Suning)
3	DF	CHN	Liu Xiaofeng (Released)
4	MF	CHN	Xiao Kun (to Sichuan Jiuniu)
8	FW	CHN	Wu Yufan (to Kunshan F.C.)
9	FW	CHN	Gong Zheng (loan return to Beijing BSU)
18	FW	CHN	Shen Tianfeng (Released)
19	FW	CHN	Zhang Jieqi (Released)
22	MF	CHN	Lü Pin (loan return to Shanghai Greenland Shenhua)
23	GK	CHN	Li Haitao (loan return to Jiangsu Suning)
25	DF	CHN	Li Minhui (to Jiangsu Yancheng Dingli)
35	DF	CHN	Pei Zhanpeng (Released)
37	DF	CHN	Li Xinze (loan return to Henan Jianye)
40	MF	CHN	Wei Chaolun (loan return to Beijing BSU)

=== Taizhou Yuanda ===
In:

No.	Pos.	Nation	Player
4	MF	CHN	Zhang Xinlin (from Jiangsu Suning)
5	DF	CRO	Marko Bašić (from (Switzerland) Grasshopper)
7	MF	SRB	Zoran Tošić (from (Serbia) Partizan)
8	MF	CHN	Liu Jianye (loan from Jiangsu Suning)
9	FW	CHN	Cheng Yuan (loan from Shandong Luneng Taishan)
13	DF	CHN	Li Shizhou (from Jiangsu Suning)
18	MF	CHN	Ni Yin (loan from Jiangsu Suning)
26	DF	CHN	Wang Dalong (loan from Shenzhen F.C.)
27	FW	NGA	Daniel Chima Chukwu (from (Norway) Molde)
32	DF	CHN	Zhang Tianlong (from Liaoning F.C.)
33	GK	CHN	Fang Jingqi (from Guangdong South China Tiger)
47	MF	CHN	Zhang Yang (from Wuhan Zall)
56	DF	CHN	Tai Jianfeng (from Shandong Luneng Taishan)
-	DF	CHN	Zheng Zhiming (loan from Guangzhou R&F)

Out:

No.	Pos.	Nation	Player
4	MF	CHN	Zhang Xinlin (loan return to Jiangsu Suning)
9	MF	CHN	Ren Yi (Released)
13	MF	CHN	Hao Ming (Released)
16	MF	CHN	Qu Yadong (Released)
20	DF	CHN	Li Shizhou (loan return to Jiangsu Suning)
22	FW	CHN	Xu Xin (Released)
26	FW	CHN	Jiang Ning (to Qingdao Jonoon)
33	FW	CHN	Chen Zheng (to Guangxi Baoyun)
36	DF	CHN	Jin Haoxiang (loan return to Zhejiang Greentown)
38	GK	CHN	Cao Guojun (to Qingdao Huanghai)

=== Xinjiang Tianshan Leopard ===
In:

No.	Pos.	Nation	Player
4	DF	CHN	Wang Baoda (from Guangxi Baoyun)
8	DF	CHN	Mirdan Ablikim (from Inner Mongolia Zhongyou)
28	MF	CHN	Wang Haozhi (from Yunnan Kunlu)

Out:

No.	Pos.	Nation	Player
4	DF	LVA	Ritus Krjauklis (Released)
7	FW	CHN	Shewket Yalqun (loan return to Guangzhou Evergrande Taobao)
8	MF	CHN	Huang Long (Released)
11	FW	BRA	Stefano Pinho (Released)
13	GK	CHN	Yusup'Ali Wahaf (to Wuhan Three Towns)
15	MF	CHN	Dilyimit Tudi (loan return to Guangzhou Evergrande Taobao)
17	MF	CHN	Ermek Talaphan (Released)
19	MF	CHN	Hairula Eshanjan (Released)
20	MF	CHN	Ulam'ali Amet (Released)
21	MF	CHN	Erpanjan Aniwar (to Chongqing Dangdai Lifan)
23	DF	CHN	Liu Ruicheng (loan return to Guangzhou Evergrande Taobao)
24	GK	CHN	Ding Runshan (Released)
25	DF	CHN	Abdurahman Yusufkadir (Released)
30	MF	CHN	Abbas'haji Awut (to Suzhou Dongwu)
39	FW	BRA	Naldinho (to Chengdu Better City)

=== Zhejiang Greentown ===
In:

No.	Pos.	Nation	Player
5	DF	CHN	Long Cheng (from Jiangsu Suning)
6	DF	CHN	Long Wei (from Henan Jianye)
16	FW	CHN	He Jian (loan return from Fujian Tianxin)
17	MF	CHN	Li Wei (from Zibo Cuju)
24	DF	CHN	Jin Haoxiang (loan return from Taizhou Yuanda)
27	MF	CHN	Xu Yike (loan return from Taizhou Yuanda)
29	MF	CHN	Wei Jingzong (from Shijiazhuang Ever Bright)
41	FW	CHN	Shao Renzhe (loan return from Fujian Tianxin)
45	MF	CHN	Shi Pengqing (loan return from Fujian Tianxin)
-	DF	CHN	Ye Churu (loan return from Hangzhou Wuyue Qiantang)
-	MF	CHN	Guo Yongchu (loan return from Hangzhou Wuyue Qiantang)
-	MF	CHN	Peng Zhengzheng (loan return from Hangzhou Wuyue Qiantang)
-	MF	CHN	Li Xingcan (loan return from Hangzhou Wuyue Qiantang)

Out:

No.	Pos.	Nation	Player
6	DF	CHN	Chen Xiao (to Hebei China Fortune)
12	DF	CHN	Tong Lei (to Dalian Professional)
17	MF	TPE	Chen Po-liang (to Changchun Yatai)
24	MF	ESP	Tana (loan return to (Spain) Las Palmas)
31	GK	CHN	Deng Xiaofei (loan return to Chongqing Dangdai Lifan)
34	GK	CHN	Zhang Lei (Released)
37	DF	CHN	Cao Xiaodong (Released)
-	MF	CHN	Li Xingcan (to Tangshan Haihuang Mingzhu)
