= Li Haitao =

Li Haitao, may refer to:

- Li Haitao (footballer), Chinese footballer
- Li Haitao (politician), Chinese politician
