= Shuang Bijia =

Chinese association football player

Personal information
- Date of birth: 14 November 1997 (age 28)
- Place of birth: Kunming, Yunnan, China
- Height: 1.75 m (5 ft 9 in)
- Position: Left winger

Youth career
- Beijing Sangao
- 2012–2015: Hangzhou Greentown
- 2016: Huesca

Senior career*
Years	Team	Apps	(Gls)
2016–2017	Toledo	0	(0)
2017–2018	Sariñena	12	(0)
2018	Alcorcón C	12	(3)
2018	Alcorcón B	1	(0)
2019	Guizhou Hengfeng	0	(0)
2020–2021	Kunming Zheng He Shipman	13	(0)
- * Club domestic league appearances and goals as of 17:14, 16 February 2023 (UTC)

Shuang Bijia (Chinese: 双必嘉; born 14 November 1997) is a Chinese footballer who plays as a left-winger.

== Club career ==
=== Early career ===
Shuang started playing football at the High School Affiliated to Renmin University of China, playing for the school's football team, Beijing Sangao. Following his graduation, he spent time in the Hangzhou Greentown academy, joining in 2012, before deciding to move abroad to pursue a footballing career.

=== Move to Europe ===
Shaung moved to Spain in early 2016, and settled at Huesca, where he had a total of twenty-two goal involvements in eighteen under-19 appearances. His performances for Huesca at youth level caught the attention of Toledo, who signed him in September 2016. He was named in the squad for a Copa del Rey fixture against Villarreal in December 2016, and would go on to make his professional debut for Toledo in this game, coming on as a second-half substitute for Samu Villa, becoming the second Chinese player to feature in the Copa del Rey after Zhang Chengdong.

Despite this appearance, Shuang left Toledo in June 2017, joining Sariñena. He made his debut in a 2–0 loss to Tarazona, before going on to make a total of twelve appearances. In 2018, he played for the reserve teams of Alcorcón.

=== Return to China ===
Shuang returned to China for the 2019 season, joining Guizhou Hengfeng and being assigned to the reserve team. In August 2020, he joined China League Two side Kunming Zheng He Shipman, but would have to wait until May of the following year to make his debut.

== Career statistics ==
=== Club ===
As of 16 February 2023.

Appearances and goals by club, season and competition
Club	Season	League			Cup		Other		Total	
Club	Season	Division	Apps	Goals	Apps	Goals	Apps	Goals	Apps	Goals
Toledo	2016–17	Segunda División B	0	0	1 (Note: Appearances in the Copa del Rey)	0	0	0	1	0
Sariñena	2017–18	Tercera División	12	0	0	0	0	0	12	0
Alcorcón C	2018–19	Tercera Aficionados Madrid	12	3	0	0	0	0	12	3
Alcorcón B	2018–19	Tercera División	1	0	0	0	0	0	1	0
Guizhou Hengfeng	2019	Chinese Super League	0	0	0	0	0	0	0	0
Kunming Zheng He Shipman	2020	China League Two	0	0	0	0	0	0	0	0
Kunming Zheng He Shipman	2021	China League Two	13	0	2 (Note: Appearances in the Chinese FA Cup)	0	0	0	15	0
Kunming Zheng He Shipman	Total		13	0	2	0	0	0	15	0
Career total			38	3	2	0	0	0	40	3
