= Shi Pengqing =

Chinese association football player

Personal information
- Date of birth: 16 April 1999 (age 27)
- Height: 1.80 m (5 ft 11 in)
- Position: Midfielder

Team information
- Current team: Zhejiang Professional
- Number: 35

Youth career
- –2021: Zhejiang Professional

Senior career*
| Years | Team | Apps | (Gls) |
| 2019– | Zhejiang Professional | 0 | (0) |
| 2019 | → Fujian Tianxin (loan) | 26 | (6) |
- * Club domestic league appearances and goals as of 14:01, 26 July 2021 (UTC)

Shi Pengqing (Chinese: 黄景峰; born 16 April 1999) is a Chinese footballer currently playing as a midfielder for Zhejiang Professional.

== Career statistics ==
=== Club ===
As of 25 July 2021.

| Club | Season | League | | | Cup | | Continental | | Other | | Total | |
| Club | Season | Division | Apps | Goals | Apps | Goals | Apps | Goals | Apps | Goals | Apps | Goals |
|---|---|---|---|---|---|---|---|---|---|---|---|---|
| Zhejiang Professional | 2019 | China League One | 0 | 0 | 0 | 0 | – | | 0 | 0 | 0 | 0 |
| Zhejiang Professional | 2020 | China League One | 0 | 0 | 1 (Note: Appearances in the Chinese FA Cup) | 0 | – | | 0 | 0 | 1 | 0 |
| Zhejiang Professional | 2021 | China League One | 0 | 0 | 0 | 0 | – | | 0 | 0 | 0 | 0 |
| Zhejiang Professional | Total | | 0 | 0 | 1 | 0 | 0 | 0 | 0 | 0 | 1 | 0 |
| Fujian Tianxin (loan) | 2019 | China League Two | 26 | 6 | 1 | 0 | – | | 2 (Note: Appearances in the China League Two playoffs) | 0 | 29 | 6 |
| Career total | | | 26 | 6 | 2 | 0 | 0 | 0 | 2 | 0 | 30 | 6 |
