= Yusup'Ali Wahaf =

Chinese association football player

Personal information
- Date of birth: 10 May 1999 (age 27)
- Place of birth: Xinjiang, China
- Height: 1.87 m (6 ft 2 in)
- Position: Goalkeeper

Team information
- Current team: Wuhan Three Towns
- Number: 35

Youth career
- –2018: Xinjiang Tianshan Leopard

Senior career*
Years	Team	Apps	(Gls)
2018–2019	Xinjiang Tianshan Leopard	9	(0)
2020–	Wuhan Three Towns	2	(0)

International career
2017	China U19		
- * Club domestic league appearances and goals as of 14:01, 11 January 2023 (UTC)

Yusup'Ali Wahaf (Chinese: 玉苏扑艾力·瓦哈甫; born 10 May 1999) is a Chinese footballer currently playing as a goalkeeper for Wuhan Three Towns.

== Club career ==
Yusup'Ali Wahaf would play for the Xinjiang Tianshan Leopard youth team before being promoted to their senior team in the 2018 China League One season. He would make his debut in a league game on 18 March 2018 against Liaoning in a 2-0 defeat. He would be utilised as a reserve choice until he left the club to join third tier club Wuhan Three Towns on 5 August 2020. In his first season with the club he would go on to aid them in winning the division title and promotion into the second tier. This would be followed by another division title win and promotion as the club entered the top tier for the first tine in their history. The following campaign he would be part of the squad that won the 2022 Chinese Super League title.

== Career statistics ==
As of 11 January 2023.

Club	Season	League			Cup		Continental		Other		Total	
Club	Season	Division	Apps	Goals	Apps	Goals	Apps	Goals	Apps	Goals	Apps	Goals
Xinjiang Tianshan Leopard	2018	China League One	6	0	0	0	-		-		6	0
Xinjiang Tianshan Leopard	2019	China League One	3	0	0	0	-		-		3	0
Xinjiang Tianshan Leopard	Total		9	0	0	0	0	0	0	0	9	0
Wuhan Three Towns	2020	China League Two	2	0	0	0	-		-		2	0
Wuhan Three Towns	2021	China League One	0	0	1	0	-		-		1	0
Wuhan Three Towns	2022	Chinese Super League	0	0	1	0	-		-		1	0
Wuhan Three Towns	Total		2	0	2	0	0	0	0	0	4	0
Career total			11	0	2	0	0	0	0	0	13	0

== Honours ==
=== Club ===
Wuhan Three Towns

- Chinese Super League: 2022.
- China League One: 2021
- China League Two: 2020
