= Wang Chuqi =

Chinese association football player

Personal information
- Date of birth: 6 February 1999 (age 27)
- Height: 1.77 m (5 ft 10 in)
- Position: Forward

Youth career
- Atlético Madrid
- –2019: Jiangsu Suning

Senior career*
Years	Team	Apps	(Gls)
2019	Jiangsu Suning	0	(0)
2019	→ Kunshan FC (loan)	1	(0)
- * Club domestic league appearances and goals as of 14:01, 25 July 2021 (UTC)

Wang Chuqi (Chinese: 王楚淇; born 6 February 1999) is a former Chinese footballer.

== Club career ==
Wang played for now-defunct Chinese Super League side Jiangsu Suning, where he stayed until his extended contract expired after the 2020 season. He later complained that the Jiansu-based club still owed him wages from previous seasons.
