= Xu Anbang =

Chinese association football player

Personal information
- Date of birth: 14 June 1999 (age 27)
- Place of birth: Zhengzhou, Henan, China
- Height: 1.78 m (5 ft 10 in)
- Position: Midfielder

Team information
- Current team: Quanzhou Yassin (on loan from Shandong Taishan)

Youth career
- Villarreal
- –2018: Shandong Taishan
- 2018: → Felgueiras 1932 (youth loan)

Senior career*
Years	Team	Apps	(Gls)
2018–	Shandong Taishan	0	(0)
2018	→ Zibo Cuju (loan)	2	(0)
2020	→ Kunshan (loan)	1	(0)
2021–	→ Quanzhou Yassin (loan)	11	(0)
- * Club domestic league appearances and goals as of 14:01, 25 July 2021 (UTC)

Xu Anbang (Chinese: 徐安邦; born 14 June 1999) is a Chinese footballer.

== Club career ==
Xu has been loaned from Shandong Taishan to lower league Chinese sides Zibo Cuju, Kunshan and Quanzhou Yassin.

== Career statistics ==
=== Club ===
As of 25 July 2021.

Club	Season	League			Cup		Continental		Other		Total	
Club	Season	Division	Apps	Goals	Apps	Goals	Apps	Goals	Apps	Goals	Apps	Goals
Shandong Taishan	2018	Chinese Super League	0	0	0	0	–		0	0	0	0
Shandong Taishan	2019	Chinese Super League	0	0	0	0	–		0	0	0	0
Shandong Taishan	2020	Chinese Super League	0	0	0	0	–		0	0	0	0
Shandong Taishan	2021	Chinese Super League	0	0	0	0	–		0	0	0	0
Shandong Taishan	Total		0	0	0	0	0	0	0	0	0	0
Zibo Cuju (loan)	2018	China League Two	2	0	0	0	–		1 (Note: Appearances in the China League Two playoffs)	0	3	0
Kunshan (loan)	2020	China League One	1	0	0	0	–		0	0	1	0
Quanzhou Yassin (loan)	2021	China League Two	11	0	0	0	–		0	0	11	0
Career total			14	0	0	0	0	0	1	0	15	0
