= Wang Congming =

Chinese association football player

Personal information
- Date of birth: 16 February 1999 (age 27)
- Place of birth: Anhui, China
- Height: 1.82 m (6 ft 0 in)
- Position: Right-back

Team information
- Current team: Dalian LFTZ Huayi

Youth career
- Villarreal
- –2020: Beijing Guoan

Senior career*
Years	Team	Apps	(Gls)
2020	Suzhou Dongwu	7	(0)
2021	Liaoning Shenyang Urban	13	(0)
2022-	Dalian LFTZ Huayi	0	(0)
- * Club domestic league appearances and goals as of 14:01, 23 May 2022 (UTC)

Wang Congming (Chinese: 王聪明; born 16 February 1999) is a Chinese footballer currently playing as a right-back for Chinese club a Dalian LFTZ Huayi.

== Career statistics ==
=== Club ===
As of 25 July 2021.

Club	Season	League			Cup		Continental		Other		Total	
Club	Season	Division	Apps	Goals	Apps	Goals	Apps	Goals	Apps	Goals	Apps	Goals
Suzhou Dongwu	2020	China League One	7	0	1 (Note: Appearances in the Chinese FA Cup)	0	–		0	0	8	0
Liaoning Shenyang Urban	2021	China League One	8	0	0	0	–		0	0	8	0
Career total			15	0	1	0	0	0	0	0	16	0
