= Chen Hongwei =

Chinese association football player

Personal information
- Date of birth: 23 November 1999 (age 26)
- Place of birth: China
- Height: 1.86 m (6 ft 1 in)
- Position: Central defender

Youth career
- –2019: Liaoning Whowin

Senior career*
Years	Team	Apps	(Gls)
2019–2020	Liaoning Whowin	10	(1)
2020	Shaanxi Chang'an Athletic	0	(0)
- * Club domestic league appearances and goals as of 14:01, 27 July 2021 (UTC)

Chen Hongwei (simplified Chinese: 陈鸿伟; traditional Chinese: 陳鴻偉; pinyin: Chén Hóngwěi; born 23 November 1999) is a Chinese footballer currently playing as a central defender.

== Career statistics ==
=== Club ===
As of 27 July 2021.

Club	Season	League			Cup		Continental		Other		Total	
Club	Season	Division	Apps	Goals	Apps	Goals	Apps	Goals	Apps	Goals	Apps	Goals
Liaoning	2019	China League One	10	1	1 (Note: Appearances in the Chinese FA Cup)	0	–		0	0	11	1
Shaanxi Chang'an Athletic	2020	China League One	0	0	0	0	–		0	0	0	0
Shaanxi Chang'an Athletic	2021	China League One	0	0	0	0	–		0	0	0	0
Shaanxi Chang'an Athletic	Total		0	0	0	0	0	0	0	0	0	0
Career total			10	1	1	0	0	0	0	0	11	1
