= Peng Junxian =

Chinese association football player

Personal information
- Date of birth: 4 January 1997 (age 29)
- Place of birth: Zhanjiang, Guangdong, China
- Height: 1.78 m (5 ft 10 in)
- Position: Midfielder

Team information
- Current team: Beijing BSU
- Number: 11

Youth career
- Oriental Dragon
- 2018–2019: Guangzhou Evergrande

Senior career*
Years	Team	Apps	(Gls)
2020–	Beijing BSU	16	(1)
- * Club domestic league appearances and goals as of 14:01, 3 August 2021 (UTC)

Peng Junxian (Chinese: 彭俊贤; born 4 January 1997) is a Chinese footballer, currently playing as a midfielder for Beijing BSU.

== Career statistics ==
=== Club ===
As of 3 August 2021.

Club	Season	League			Cup		Continental		Other		Total	
Club	Season	Division	Apps	Goals	Apps	Goals	Apps	Goals	Apps	Goals	Apps	Goals
Beijing BSU	2020	China League One	13	1	0	0	–		0	0	13	1
Beijing BSU	2021	China League One	3	0	0	0	–		0	0	3	0
Career total			16	1	0	0	0	0	0	0	16	1
