= Fan Hengbo =

Chinese association football player

Personal information
- Date of birth: 14 July 1999 (age 27)
- Height: 1.74 m (5 ft 9 in)
- Position: Forward

Youth career
- –2020: Guangzhou Evergrande

Senior career*
Years	Team	Apps	(Gls)
2020–2023	Guangzhou FC	37	(0)
2020	→ Inner Mongolia Zhongyou (loan)	8	(0)

International career
- China U19
- * Club domestic league appearances and goals as of 14:01, 6 May 2022 (UTC)

Fan Hengbo (Chinese: 范恒博; born 14 July 1999) is a Chinese footballer currently playing as a forward.

== Career statistics ==
=== Club ===
As of 25 June 2021.

Club	Season	League			Cup		Continental		Other		Total	
Club	Season	Division	Apps	Goals	Apps	Goals	Apps	Goals	Apps	Goals	Apps	Goals
Guangzhou	2020	Chinese Super League	0	0	0	0	0	0	0	0	0	0
Guangzhou	2021	Chinese Super League	0	0	0	0	1 (Note: Appearances in the AFC Champions League)	0	0	0	1	0
Guangzhou	Total		0	0	0	0	0	0	0	0	1	0
Inner Mongolia Zhongyou (loan)	2020	China League One	7	0	0	0	–		1 (Note: Appearances in the China League One relegation playoffs)	0	8	0
Career total			7	0	0	0	0	0	1	0	9	0
