= Wu Minfeng =

Chinese association football player

Personal information
- Date of birth: 24 January 1999 (age 27)
- Height: 1.72 m (5 ft 8 in)
- Position: Midfielder

Team information
- Current team: Jiangxi Beidamen
- Number: 31

Senior career*
Years	Team	Apps	(Gls)
2019	Guangdong South China Tiger	16	(0)
2020–	Jiangxi Beidamen	5	(0)
- * Club domestic league appearances and goals as of 14:01, 24 August 2021 (UTC)

Wu Minfeng (Chinese: 吴民峰; born 24 January 1999) is a Chinese footballer currently playing as a midfielder for Jiangxi Beidamen.

== Career statistics ==
=== Club ===
As of 24 August 2021.

Club	Season	League			Cup		Other		Total	
Club	Season	Division	Apps	Goals	Apps	Goals	Apps	Goals	Apps	Goals
Guangdong South China Tiger	2019	China League One	16	0	1 (Note: Appearances in the Chinese FA Cup)	0	0	0	17	0
Jiangxi Beidamen	2020	China League One	2	0	0	0	0	0	1	0
Jiangxi Beidamen	2021	China League One	3	0	1	0	0	0	4	0
Jiangxi Beidamen	Total		5	0	1	0	0	0	6	0
Career total			21	0	2	0	0	0	23	0
