= Sun Guan'ou =

Chinese association football player

Personal information
- Date of birth: 24 February 2000 (age 26)
- Place of birth: Shou County, Lu'an, Anhui, China
- Height: 1.82 m (6 ft 0 in)
- Position: Forward

Team information
- Current team: Ji'nan Xingzhou (on loan from Shanghai Port)

Youth career
- –2020: Shanghai Port

Senior career*
| Years | Team | Apps | (Gls) |
| 2020– | Shanghai Port | 0 | (0) |
| 2020 | → Inner Mongolia Zhongyou (loan) | 1 | (0) |
| 2022- | → Ji'nan Xingzhou (loan) | 0 | (0) |
- * Club domestic league appearances and goals as of 14:01, 6 May 2022 (UTC)

Sun Guan'ou (Chinese: 孙冠欧; born 24 February 2000) is a Chinese footballer currently playing as a forward for Ji'nan Xingzhou, on loan from Shanghai Port.

== Career statistics ==
=== Club ===
As of 28 June 2021.

| Club | Season | League | | | Cup | | Continental | | Other | | Total | |
| Club | Season | Division | Apps | Goals | Apps | Goals | Apps | Goals | Apps | Goals | Apps | Goals |
|---|---|---|---|---|---|---|---|---|---|---|---|---|
| Shanghai Port | 2020 | Chinese Super League | 0 | 0 | 1 (Note: Appearances in the Chinese FA Cup) | 0 | 1 (Note: Appearances in the AFC Champions League qualification) | 0 | 0 | 0 | 1 | 0 |
| Shanghai Port | 2021 | Chinese Super League | 0 | 0 | 0 | 0 | 0 | 0 | 0 | 0 | 0 | 0 |
| Shanghai Port | Total | | 0 | 0 | 1 | 0 | 1 | 0 | 0 | 0 | 2 | 0 |
| Inner Mongolia Zhongyou (loan) | 2020 | China League One | 1 | 0 | 0 | 0 | – | | 0 | 0 | 1 | 0 |
| Career total | | | 1 | 0 | 1 | 0 | 1 | 0 | 0 | 0 | 3 | 0 |
