= Yang Ailong =

Chinese footballer

Yang Ailong 杨艾龙
Personal information
- Date of birth: 2 January 1995 (age 31)
- Place of birth: Tieling, Liaoning, China
- Height: 1.86 m (6 ft 1 in)
- Position: Midfielder

Team information
- Current team: Shenyang Urban
- Number: 6

Youth career
- 2009–2011: Changchun Yatai
- 2011–2012: Casa Pia
- 2013: Sacavenense
- 2016: Jiangsu Suning
- 2019: Changchun Yatai

Senior career*
| Years | Team | Apps | (Gls) |
| 2014 | Atlético CP | 0 | (0) |
| 2014–2015 | Sacavenense | 4 | (0) |
| 2015–2016 | Torreense | 13 | (0) |
| 2016–2017 | Pinhalnovense | 10 | (0) |
| 2017 | Yanbian Funde | 1 | (0) |
| 2018–2019 | Torreense | 0 | (0) |
| 2020– | Shenyang Urban | 10 | (0) |
- * Club domestic league appearances and goals as of 31 December 2020

Yang Ailong (Chinese: 杨艾龙; pinyin: Yáng Àilóng; Mandarin pronunciation: [jǎŋ.âɪ lʊ̌ŋ]; born 2 January 1995) is a Chinese footballer who plays for Shenyang Urban.

== Career ==
Yang went to Portugal for further training following Chinese Football Association 500.com Stars Project in 2011. He played for Casa Pia and Sacavenense between 2011 and 2013. Yang joined Segunda Liga side Atlético CP in the summer of 2014 after settling his contract disputes with former club Changchun Yatai. He transferred back to Campeonato Nacional de Seniores side Sacavenense in November 2014. Yang moved to Torreense in July 2015. On 15 July 2016, Yang was loaned to Chinese Super League side Jiangsu Suning along with Liu Junshuai. He played for Jiangsu Suning's reserve team and returned to Portugal in October 2016. He joined Campeonato de Portugal side Pinhalnovense for the 2016–17 season.

Yang transferred to Chinese Super League side Yanbian Funde on 13 July 2017. He made his debut for Yanbian on 23 July 2017 in a 6–2 away defeat against Guangzhou R&F as the benefit of the new rule of the league that at least one Under-23 player must be in the starting line-up and was substituted off by Sun Jun in the 17th minute. Yang received trial with Guizhou Hengfeng following Yanbian's relegation at the end of 2017 season. However, his former club Changchun Yatai submitted a claim to the Chinese Football Association for his ownership and held back his further transfer.

Yang rejoined S.C.U. Torreense in the summer of 2018.

== Career statistics ==
As of 31 December 2020

Appearances and goals by club, season and competition
| Club | Season | League | | | National cup | | League cup | | Continental | | Total | |
| Club | Season | Division | Apps | Goals | Apps | Goals | Apps | Goals | Apps | Goals | Apps | Goals |
|---|---|---|---|---|---|---|---|---|---|---|---|---|
| Atlético CP | 2014–15 | Segunda Liga | 0 | 0 | 0 | 0 | 0 | 0 | – | | 0 | 0 |
| Sacavenense | 2014–15 | Campeonato de Portugal | 4 | 0 | 0 | 0 | – | | – | | 4 | 0 |
| Torreense | 2015–16 | Campeonato de Portugal | 13 | 0 | 0 | 0 | – | | – | | 13 | 0 |
| Pinhalnovense | 2016–17 | Campeonato de Portugal | 10 | 0 | 0 | 0 | – | | – | | 10 | 0 |
| Yanbian Funde | 2017 | Chinese Super League | 1 | 0 | 0 | 0 | – | | – | | 1 | 0 |
| Torreense | 2018–19 | Campeonato de Portugal | 0 | 0 | 1 | 0 | – | | – | | 1 | 0 |
| Shenyang Urban | 2020 | China League One | 10 | 0 | – | | – | | – | | 10 | 0 |
| Career total | | | 38 | 0 | 1 | 0 | 0 | 0 | 0 | 0 | 39 | 0 |
