= Zhang Hui (footballer, born 2000) =

Chinese association football player

Personal information
- Date of birth: 8 October 2000 (age 26)
- Place of birth: Qujing, Yunnan, China
- Height: 1.72 m (5 ft 8 in)
- Position: Midfielder

Team information
- Current team: Shanxi Chongde Ronghai
- Number: 38

Youth career
- –2019: Hebei China Fortune

Senior career*
Years	Team	Apps	(Gls)
2019–2021	Hebei FC	19	(1)
2019–2020	→ Wuhan Three Towns (loan)	40	(8)
2022–2025	Wuhan Three Towns	15	(0)
2023	→ Haikou Mingcheng (loan)	8	(3)
2025	→ Nanjing City (loan)	17	(1)
2026–	Shanxi Chongde Ronghai	0	(0)

International career
2016	China U16	5	(0)
- * Club domestic league appearances and goals as of 14:01, 11 January 2023 (UTC)

Zhang Hui (Chinese: 张辉; born 8 October 2000) is a Chinese footballer currently playing as a midfielder for China League Two club Shanxi Chongde Ronghai.

== Club career ==
Zhang Hui would play for the Hebei FC youth team before going on loan to third tier football club Wuhan Three Towns in the 2019 China League Two season. He would have his loan renewed with Wuhan for the following season, which saw the club win the division and promotion to the second tier. On his return to Hebei, he would eventually make his debut for the club on 23 April 2021 against Wuhan in a 1–1 draw.

On 29 April 2022, it was announced that Zhang would rejoin the now newly-promoted Chinese Super League club Wuhan Three Towns. On his return he would be part of the squad that won the 2022 Chinese Super League title.

== Career statistics ==
As of 11 January 2023.

Club	Season	League			Cup		Continental		Other		Total	
Club	Season	Division	Apps	Goals	Apps	Goals	Apps	Goals	Apps	Goals	Apps	Goals
Hebei FC	2019	Chinese Super League	0	0	0	0	–		–		0	0
Hebei FC	2020	Chinese Super League	0	0	0	0	–		–		0	0
Hebei FC	2021	Chinese Super League	19	1	1	0	–		–		20	1
Hebei FC	Total		19	1	1	0	0	0	0	0	20	1
Wuhan Three Towns (loan)	2019	China League Two	28	7	0	0	–		2 (Note: Appearances in the China League Two playoffs)	0	30	7
Wuhan Three Towns (loan)	2020	China League Two	8	1	0	0	–		2	0	10	1
Wuhan Three Towns (loan)	Total		36	8	0	0	0	0	4	0	40	8
Wuhan Three Towns	2022	Chinese Super League	15	0	2	0	–		–		17	0
Career total			70	9	3	0	0	0	4	0	77	9

== Honours ==
Wuhan Three Towns

- Chinese Super League: 2022
- China League Two: 2020
- Chinese FA Super Cup: 2023
