= Li Shizhou =

Chinese footballer

Li Shizhou 李世洲
Personal information
- Full name: Li Shizhou
- Date of birth: 27 November 1995 (age 30)
- Place of birth: Dalian, Liaoning, China
- Height: 1.75 m (5 ft 9 in)
- Position: Defender

Team information
- Current team: Wuxi Wugou

Youth career
- Dalian Shide

Senior career*
Years	Team	Apps	(Gls)
2013	Liaoning Youth	14	(3)
2014–2019	Jiangsu Suning	1	(0)
2016	→ Shenyang Urban (loan)	9	(0)
2018	→ Zhejiang Yiteng (loan)	20	(1)
2019	→ Taizhou Yuanda (loan)	6	(0)
2020	Taizhou Yuanda	4	(0)
2021	Suzhou Dongwu	10	(0)
2022-	Wuxi Wugou	0	(0)
- * Club domestic league appearances and goals as of 25 April 2022

Li Shizhou (Chinese: 李世洲; born 27 November 1995 in Dalian) is a Chinese footballer who plays for China League Two side Wuxi Wugou.

== Club career ==
In 2013, Li Shizhou started his professional footballer career with Liaoning Youth in the China League Two. He transferred to Chinese Super League club Jiangsu Sainty in 2014. On 13 September 2014, Li made his debut for Jiangsu in the 2014 Chinese Super League against Beijing Guoan, coming on as a substitute for Ji Xiang in the 92nd minute. He was sent to the reserved team in 2015 and 2017. In June 2016, Li was loaned to China League Two side Shenyang Urban until 31 December 2016.

On 9 February 2018, Li was loaned to China League One side Zhejiang Yiteng until 31 December 2018.

== Career statistics ==
Statistics accurate as of match played 31 December 2019.

Appearances and goals by club, season and competition
Club	Season	League			National Cup		Continental		Other		Total	
Club	Season	Division	Apps	Goals	Apps	Goals	Apps	Goals	Apps	Goals	Apps	Goals
Liaoning Youth	2013	China League Two	14	3	-		-		-		14	3
Jiangsu Sainty	2014	Chinese Super League	1	0	0	0	-		-		1	0
Shenyang Urban (loan)	2016	China League Two	9	0	0	0	-		-		9	0
Zhejiang Yiteng (loan)	2018	China League One	20	1	0	0	-		-		20	1
Taizhou Yuanda (loan)	2019	China League Two	6	0	0	0	-		-		6	0
Taizhou Yuanda	2020	China League One	4	0	0	0	-		-		4	0
Career total			54	4	0	0	0	0	0	0	54	4
