= Long Wei =

Chinese footballer (born 1995)

Long Wei 龙威
Personal information
- Date of birth: 22 January 1995 (age 31)
- Place of birth: Wuhan, Hubei, China
- Height: 1.86 m (6 ft 1 in)
- Positions: Defender; defensive midfielder

Team information
- Current team: Wuhan Three Towns
- Number: 6

Senior career*
Years	Team	Apps	(Gls)
2014–2015	Wuhan Zall	8	(0)
2016–2019	Henan Jianye	25	(0)
2020–2022	Zhejiang FC	54	(2)
2023–2024	Qingdao Hainiu	47	(0)
2025–	Wuhan Three Towns	46	(1)
- * Club domestic league appearances and goals as of 22 November 2026

Long Wei (Chinese: 龙威; born 22 January 1995 in Wuhan) is a Chinese professional football player who currently plays for Wuhan Three Towns as a defender or defensive midfielder.

== Club career ==
In 2014, Long Wei started his professional footballer career with Wuhan Zall in the China League One. On 14 July 2016, Long signed for Chinese Super League side Henan Jianye. On 16 July 2016, Long made his debut for Henan in the 2016 Chinese Super League against Chongqing Lifan. After several seasons at the club he was unable to establish himself within the team and joined second tier club Zhejiang Pro on 15 January 2020 on a free transfer. He would make his debut in a league game on 12 September 2020 against Guizhou in a 1-1 draw. He would then play a vital part as the club gained promotion to the top tier at the end of the 2021 campaign.

On 27 January 2025, Long signed Chinese Super League club Wuhan Three Towns.

== Career statistics ==
Statistics accurate as of match played 31 December 2024.

Appearances and goals by club, season and competition
Club	Season	League			National Cup		Continental		Other		Total	
Club	Season	Division	Apps	Goals	Apps	Goals	Apps	Goals	Apps	Goals	Apps	Goals
Wuhan Zall	2014	China League One	1	0	0	0	-		-		1	0
Wuhan Zall	2015	China League One	7	0	1	0	-		-		8	0
Wuhan Zall	Total		8	0	1	0	0	0	0	0	9	0
Henan Jianye	2016	Chinese Super League	7	0	2	0	-		-		9	0
Henan Jianye	2017	Chinese Super League	2	0	1	0	-		-		3	0
Henan Jianye	2018	Chinese Super League	15	0	1	0	-		-		16	0
Henan Jianye	2019	Chinese Super League	1	0	1	0	-		-		2	0
Henan Jianye	Total		25	0	5	0	0	0	0	0	30	0
Zhejiang Greentown	2020	China League One	14	0	1	0	-		2 (Note: Appearance(s) in CSL Relegation play-offs)	0	17	0
Zhejiang Greentown	2021	China League One	25	1	0	0	-		0	0	25	1
Zhejiang Greentown	2022	Chinese Super League	15	1	2	0	-		-		17	1
Zhejiang Greentown	Total		54	2	3	0	0	0	2	0	59	2
Qingdao Hainiu	2023	Chinese Super League	20	0	2	0	-		-		22	0
Qingdao Hainiu	2024	Chinese Super League	27	0	1	0	-		-		28	0
Qingdao Hainiu	Total		47	0	3	0	0	0	0	0	50	0
Career total			134	2	12	0	0	0	2	0	148	2
