= Jin Haoxiang =

Chinese association football player

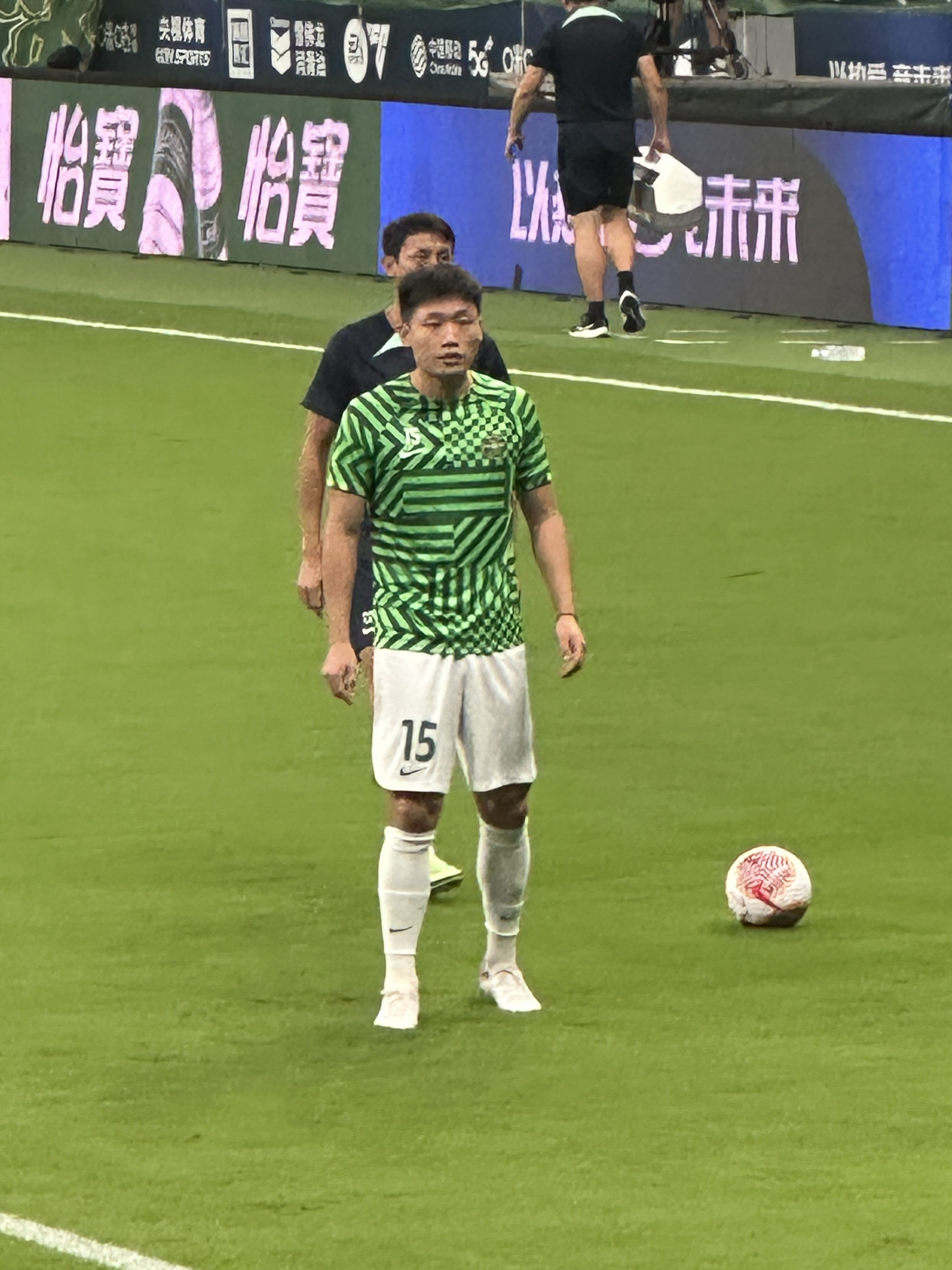
- Jin Haoxiang in August 2024

Personal information
- Date of birth: 14 June 1999 (age 27)
- Place of birth: Haining, Zhejiang, China
- Height: 1.84 m (6 ft 0 in)
- Position: Defender

Team information
- Current team: Hangzhou Linping Wuyue
- Number: 4

Youth career
- –2018: Zhejiang Greentown

Senior career*
Years	Team	Apps	(Gls)
2018–2024	Zhejiang FC	9	(0)
2019	→ Taizhou Yuanda (loan)	9	(0)
2022	→ Hainan Star (loan)	10	(2)
2025-	Hangzhou Linping Wuyue	21	(0)

International career^{‡}
2018	China U19	2	(0)
- * Club domestic league appearances and goals as of 17 March 2024 ‡ National team caps and goals as of 14:01, 26 July 2021 (UTC)

Jin Haoxiang (Chinese: 金浩翔; born 14 June 1999) is a Chinese footballer currently playing as a defender for Hangzhou Linping Wuyue.

== Club career ==
In 2018 Jin Haoxiang would be promoted to the senior team of Zhejiang FC and would make his debut on 25 August 2018 in a league game against Liaoning FC in a 2-2 draw. The following season he would be loaned out to third tier club Fujian Tianxin to gain more playing time. On his return, he would be used sparingly within the team as they renamed themselves Zhejiang Professional. He would be a squad player as the club gained promotion to the top tier at the end of the 2021 campaign. Once again, Jin would be loaned out to a third tier club in Hainan Star throughout the 2022 China League Two campaign.

== Career statistics ==
As of 31 January 2023.

Club	Season	League			Cup		Continental		Other		Total	
Club	Season	Division	Apps	Goals	Apps	Goals	Apps	Goals	Apps	Goals	Apps	Goals
Zhejiang FC	2018	China League One	1	0	1	0	–		–		2	0
Zhejiang FC	2019	China League One	2	0	0	0	–		–		2	0
Zhejiang FC	2020	China League One	0	0	0	0	–		0 (Note: Appearances in Promotion/Relegation Play-offs)	0	0	0
Zhejiang FC	2021	China League One	3	0	1	0	–		0	0	1	0
Zhejiang FC	Total		6	0	2	0	0	0	0	0	8	0
Taizhou Yuanda (loan)	2019	China League Two	9	0	0	0	–		–		9	0
Hainan Star (loan)	2022	China League Two	10	2	0	0	–		–		10	2
Career total			25	2	2	0	0	0	0	0	27	2
