= Abduwahap Aniwar =

Chinese association football player

Personal information
- Date of birth: 14 May 2000 (age 26)
- Place of birth: Hotan, Xinjiang, China
- Height: 1.68 m (5 ft 6 in)
- Position: Midfielder

Team information
- Current team: Foshan Nanshi (on loan from Shaanxi Union)
- Number: 25

Youth career
- 2012–2020: Guangzhou Evergrande

Senior career*
Years	Team	Apps	(Gls)
2020–2022	Kunshan FC	33	(1)
2023–2024	Guangzhou FC	47	(7)
2025–	Shaanxi Union	31	(8)
2026–	→ Foshan Nanshi (loan)	0	(0)
- * Club domestic league appearances and goals as of 14:01, 26 March 2024 (UTC)

Abduwahap Aniwar (Chinese: 阿卜杜瓦哈普·艾尼瓦尔; born 14 May 2000) is a Chinese footballer currently playing as a midfielder for Foshan Nanshi, on loan from Shaanxi Union.

== Club career ==
Aniwar played for the Guangzhou FC youth team before he joined second-tier club Kunshan FC on 23 July 2020. He went on to make his debut in a league game on 16 September 2020 against Nantong Zhiyun in a 0–0 draw. This was followed by his first goal for the club in a league game on 25 September 2021 against Beijing BIT in a 4–0 victory. He went on to establish himself as regular within the team and was part of the squad that won the division and promotion to the top tier at the end of the 2022 China League One campaign.

On 9 July 2026, Aniwar was loaned out to China League One side Foshan Nanshi for the rest of 2026 season.

== Career statistics ==
As of 26 March 2024.

Club	Season	League			Cup		Continental		Other		Total	
Club	Season	Division	Apps	Goals	Apps	Goals	Apps	Goals	Apps	Goals	Apps	Goals
Kunshan FC	2020	China League One	7	0	2	0	-		-		9	0
Kunshan FC	2021	China League One	7	1	1	0	-		-		8	1
Kunshan FC	2022	China League One	19	0	2	2	-		-		21	2
Kunshan FC	Total		33	1	5	2	0	0	0	0	38	3
Guangzhou FC	2023	China League One	18	3	2	0	-		-		20	3
Guangzhou FC	2024	China League One	3	0	0	0	-		-		3	0
Guangzhou FC	Total		21	3	2	0	0	0	0	0	23	0
Career total			54	4	7	2	0	0	0	0	61	6

== Honours ==
=== Club ===
Kunshan

- China League One: 2022
