= Zhang Haochen (footballer) =

Chinese footballer (born 2000)

Personal information
- Date of birth: 3 February 2000 (age 26)
- Place of birth: Beijing, China
- Height: 1.80 m (5 ft 11 in)
- Position: Defender

Team information
- Current team: Heilongjiang Ice City

Youth career
- –2020: Shandong Luneng

Senior career*
Years	Team	Apps	(Gls)
2018–2020	Shandong Luneng	0	(0)
2018–2019	→ Desportivo Brasil (loan)	0	(0)
2020–2021	Qingdao	7	(0)
2022–	Heilongjiang Ice City	0	(0)
- * Club domestic league appearances and goals as of 14:01, 25 April 2022 (UTC)

Zhang Haochen (Chinese: 张浩宸; born 3 February 2000) is a Chinese footballer who plays as a defender for Heilongjiang Ice City.

== Career ==
Zhang Haochen would play for the Shandong Luneng youth team before going abroad to join Brazilian football team Desportivo Brasil on loan. On 22 September 2018 he would make his senior debut for the club against Red Bull Brasil in a Copa Paulista game that ended in a 3–1 defeat. After his loan ended he was allowed to join newly promoted top-tier side Qingdao Huanghai on 15 July 2020. He would go on to make his debut for the club in a Chinese FA Cup game against Beijing Sinobo Guoan F.C. on 19 September 2020 that ended in a 2–1 defeat.

== Career statistics ==
As of 31 December 2020

Appearances and goals by club, season and competition
Club	Season	League			Cup		Continental		Other		Total	
Club	Season	Division	Apps	Goals	Apps	Goals	Apps	Goals	Apps	Goals	Apps	Goals
Shandong Luneng	2018	Chinese Super League	0	0	0	0	–		0	0	0	0
Shandong Luneng	2019	Chinese Super League	0	0	0	0	–		0	0	0	0
Shandong Luneng	2020	Chinese Super League	0	0	0	0	–		0	0	0	0
Shandong Luneng	Total		0	0	0	0	0	0	0	0	0	0
Desportivo Brasil (loan)	2018	–			0	0	–		1 (Note: Appearances in the Copa Paulista)	0	1	0
Desportivo Brasil (loan)	2019	–			0	0	–		0	0	0	0
Desportivo Brasil (loan)	Total		0	0	0	0	0	0	1	0	1	0
Qingdao Huanghai	2020	Chinese Super League	3	0	1 (Note: Appearances in the Chinese FA Cup)	0	–		–		4	0
Career total			3	0	1	0	0	0	1	0	5	0
