= Pei Zhanpeng =

Chinese association football player

Personal information
- Date of birth: 7 February 1999 (age 27)
- Height: 1.77 m (5 ft 10 in)
- Position: Full-back

Youth career
- 2010–2011: Hangzhou Greentown
- 2012–2017: Atlético Madrid
- 2017–2018: Dalian Pro

Senior career*
Years	Team	Apps	(Gls)
2019	Suzhou Dongwu	22	(0)
2020	Wuxi Xinje		
2021–2022	Fuzhou Hengxing		
2022–2024	Zhuhai 2030		
Total		22	(0)
- * Club domestic league appearances and goals as of 14:01, 21 July 2026 (UTC)

Pei Zhanpeng (Chinese: 裴展鹏; born 7 February 1999) is a Chinese former footballer who played as a defender.

== Club career ==
Pei began his career with Hangzhou Greentown, where he played between 2010 and 2011. He joined Spanish club Atlético Madrid in 2012, as part of a Wanda Group initiative to encourage young Chinese footballers to play in Spain. On his return to China in 2017, he joined the academy of Dalian Pro – another Wanda Group-affiliated club.

In 2019 he joined China League Two club Suzhou Dongwu. Having helped the club earn promotion to China League One, he was released at the end of the season. He spent 2020 with Wuxi Xinje, as the club were promoted from the Chinese Champions League to China League Two. A spell with lower-division club Fuzhou Hengxing was followed by success with Zhuhai 2030.

== Career statistics ==
=== Club ===
As of 25 July 2021.

Appearances and goals by club, season and competition
Club	Season	League			Cup (Note: Includes Chinese FA Cup)		Other		Total	
Club	Season	Division	Apps	Goals	Apps	Goals	Apps	Goals	Apps	Goals
Suzhou Dongwu	2019	China League Two	22	0	1	0	1 (Note: Appearances in the China League Two playoffs)	0	24	0
Career total			22	0	1	0	1	0	24	0
