= Li Junfeng (footballer) =

Chinese association football player

Personal information
- Date of birth: 8 August 1997 (age 29)
- Place of birth: Maoming, Guangdong. China
- Height: 1.76 m (5 ft 9 in)
- Position: Full-back

Youth career
- –2015: Guangzhou R&F
- 2015–2016: Gondomar

Senior career*
Years	Team	Apps	(Gls)
2016–2017	Gondomar B	18	(0)
2017	Wuhan Zall	5	(0)
2018	Gondomar B	0	(0)
2018–2019	SC Coimbrões	8	(0)
2019–2020	Padroense	15	(0)
2020–2023	Meizhou Hakka	32	(0)
2024	Shaoxing Shangyu Pterosaur	11	(0)
- * Club domestic league appearances and goals as of 14:01, 31 December 2022 (UTC)

Li Junfeng (Chinese: 李俊锋; born 8 August 1997) is a Chinese footballer who plays as a full-back.

== Club career ==
Li Junfeng would go abroad to Portugal to start his professional career with Gondomar and especially the Gondomar B team before returning to China with second tier club Wuhan Zall on 30 June 2017. With them he would make his debut in a league game on 1 July 2017 against Baoding Yingli ETS that ended in a 2-2 draw. After a handful of games he returned to Portugal and played for SC Coimbrões and Padroense before going back to China again when he joined second tier club Meizhou Hakka on 24 February 2020. Making his debut in a league game on 20 September 2020 against Jiangxi Liansheng that ended in a 4-0 victory. After the game he would be utilized squad player and was part of the team that gained promotion to the top tier after coming second within the division at the end of the 2021 China League One campaign.

== Career statistics ==
As of 31 December 2022.

Club	Season	League			Cup		Continental		Other		Total	
Club	Season	Division	Apps	Goals	Apps	Goals	Apps	Goals	Apps	Goals	Apps	Goals
Gondomar B	2016–2017	AF Porto Divisão de Elite	18	0	0	0	–		–		18	0
Wuhan Zall	2017	China League One	5	0	0	0	–		–		5	0
SC Coimbrões	2018–19	Campeonato de Portugal	8	0	1 (Note: Appearances in the Taça de Portugal)	0	–		–		9	0
Padroense	2019–20	AF Porto Divisão de Elite	15	0	0	0	–		–		15	0
Meizhou Hakka	2020	China League One	10	0	0	0	–		–		10	0
Meizhou Hakka	2021	China League One	11	0	0	0	–		–		11	0
Meizhou Hakka	2022	Chinese Super League	10	0	0	0	–		–		10	0
Meizhou Hakka	Total		31	0	0	0	0	0	0	0	31	0
Career total			77	0	1	0	0	0	0	0	78	0
