= Liu Ruicheng =

Chinese association football player

Personal information
- Date of birth: 28 April 1999 (age 27)
- Place of birth: Xishuangbanna, Yunnan, China
- Height: 1.79 m (5 ft 10 in)
- Position: Left-back

Team information
- Current team: Guangdong Mingtu
- Number: 3

Youth career
- 2012: Nanjing FA
- 2013: Shanghai Genbao
- 2014–2018: Guangzhou Evergrande

Senior career*
Years	Team	Apps	(Gls)
2018–2020	Guangzhou Evergrande	0	(0)
2018	→ Inner Mongolia Zhongyou (loan)	0	(0)
2019	→ Xinjiang Tianshan Leopard (loan)	1	(0)
2020–2022	Kunshan FC	3	(0)
2022	→ Jiangxi Dark Horse Junior (loan)	4	(1)
2023–2025	Wenzhou FC	17	(0)
2025–	Guangdong Mingtu	8	(0)
- * Club domestic league appearances and goals as of 14:01, 20 August 2021 (UTC)

Liu Ruicheng (Chinese: 刘芮成; born 28 April 1999) is a Chinese footballer currently playing as a left-back for Guangdong Mingtu.

== Career statistics ==
=== Club ===
As of 20 August 2021.

Club	Season	League			Cup		Other		Total	
Club	Season	Division	Apps	Goals	Apps	Goals	Apps	Goals	Apps	Goals
Guangzhou Evergrande	2018	Chinese Super League	0	0	0	0	0	0	0	0
Guangzhou Evergrande	2019	Chinese Super League	0	0	0	0	0	0	0	0
Guangzhou Evergrande	2020	Chinese Super League	0	0	0	0	0	0	0	0
Guangzhou Evergrande	Total		0	0	0	0	0	0	0	0
Inner Mongolia Zhongyou (loan)	2018	China League One	0	0	0	0	0	0	0	0
Xinjiang Tianshan Leopard (loan)	2019	China League One	1	0	0	0	0	0	1	0
Kunshan FC	2020	China League One	3	0	1 (Note: Appearances in the Chinese FA Cup)	0	0	0	4	0
Kunshan FC	2021	China League One	0	0	0	0	0	0	0	0
Kunshan FC	Total		3	0	1	0	0	0	4	0
Career total			4	0	1	0	0	0	5	0
