= Dilyimit Tudi =

Chinese footballer

Dilyimit Tudi 迪力依米提·土地
Personal information
- Date of birth: 25 February 1999 (age 27)
- Place of birth: Altay, Xinjiang, China
- Height: 1.80 m (5 ft 11 in)
- Position: Midfielder

Team information
- Current team: Changchun Yatai
- Number: 16

Youth career
- 2017–2019: Guangzhou Evergrande

Senior career*
Years	Team	Apps	(Gls)
2019	Guangzhou Evergrande	0	(0)
2019	→ Xinjiang Tianshan Leopard (loan)	23	(1)
2020–	Changchun Yatai	90	(0)
2023	→ Henan FC (loan)	20	(1)
2024	→ Cangzhou Mighty Lions (loan)	7	(0)
2025	→ Suzhou Dongwu (loan)	7	(0)

International career^{‡}
2022	China U22		
2022–	China	2	(0)
Medal record
Representing China
Men's football
EAFF Championship
Bronze medal – third place	2022 Japan	Team
- * Club domestic league appearances and goals as of 31 December 2024 ‡ National team caps and goals as of 27 July 2022

Dilyimit Tudi (Chinese: 迪力依米提·土地; born 25 February 1999) is a Chinese professional footballer who plays as a midfielder for China League One club Changchun Yatai.

== Club career ==
Dilyimit Tudi was born in Xinjiang. He joined Guangzhou Evergrande's youth setup prior to the 2019 season, before spending a year on loan with then-China League One club Xinjiang Tianshan Leopard. He established himself during the 2019 China League One season and made 23 league appearances for the first team, guiding them to a comfortable 13th place in the Chinese second tier.

His efforts on loan attracted the interest of Changchun Yatai, who signed him to a permanent deal in February 2020. Due to the 2020 China League One season being delayed, the club did not officially announce his arrival until August 2020. Tudi played in 12 of the team's 15 games during the 2020 China League One campaign, helping the team claim the title and win promotion back into the Chinese Super League.

== International career ==
On 20 July 2022, Dilyimit made his international debut in a 3-0 defeat against South Korea in the 2022 EAFF E-1 Football Championship, as the Chinese FA decided to field the U-23 national team for this senior competition.

== Career statistics ==
As of match played 31 December 2024

Appearances and goals by club, season and competition
Club	Season	League			National Cup		Continental		Other		Total	
Club	Season	Division	Apps	Goals	Apps	Goals	Apps	Goals	Apps	Goals	Apps	Goals
Xinjiang Tianshan Leopard (loan)	2019	China League One	23	1	1	0	–		–		24	1
Changchun Yatai	2020	China League One	12	0	2	0	–		–		14	0
Changchun Yatai	2021	Chinese Super League	17	0	2	1	–		–		19	1
Changchun Yatai	2022	Chinese Super League	18	0	1	0	–		–		19	0
Changchun Yatai	2024	Chinese Super League	11	0	1	1	–		–		12	1
Changchun Yatai	Total		58	0	6	2	0	0	0	0	64	2
Henan FC (loan)	2023	Chinese Super League	20	1	2	0	–		–		22	1
Cangzhou Mighty Lions (loan)	2024	Chinese Super League	7	0	1	0	–		–		8	0
Career total			108	2	10	2	0	0	0	0	118	4

== Honours ==
=== Club ===
Changchun Yatai

- China League One: 2020
