= Ci Henglong =

Chinese association football player

Personal information
- Date of birth: 3 May 2000 (age 26)
- Height: 1.93 m (6 ft 4 in)
- Position: Goalkeeper

Team information
- Current team: Guangzhou Dandelion

Youth career
- –2018: Beijing Renhe
- 2019–2020: Heilongjiang Ice City

Senior career*
| Years | Team | Apps | (Gls) |
| 2020–2023 | Changchun Yatai | 1 | (0) |
| 2023–2024 | Shanghai Second | 0 | (0) |
| 2024–2025 | Guizhou Guiyang Athletic | 18 | (0) |
| 2025–2026 | Shanghai Zetian | 0 | (0) |
| 2026– | Guangzhou Dandelion | 0 | (0) |
- * Club domestic league appearances and goals as of 14:01, 12 August 2021 (UTC)

Ci Henglong (simplified Chinese: 慈恒龙; traditional Chinese: 慈恒龍; pinyin: Cí Hénglóng; born 3 May 2000) is a Chinese footballer playing as a goalkeeper for Guangzhou Dandelion.

== Career statistics ==
=== Club ===
As of 12 August 2021.

| Club | Season | League | | | Cup | | Continental | | Other | | Total | |
| Club | Season | Division | Apps | Goals | Apps | Goals | Apps | Goals | Apps | Goals | Apps | Goals |
|---|---|---|---|---|---|---|---|---|---|---|---|---|
| Changchun Yatai | 2020 | China League One | 0 | 0 | 1 (Note: Appearances in the Chinese FA Cup) | 0 | – | | 0 | 0 | 1 | 0 |
| Changchun Yatai | 2021 | Chinese Super League | 1 | 0 | 0 | 0 | – | | 0 | 0 | 1 | 0 |
| Career total | | | 1 | 0 | 1 | 0 | 0 | 0 | 0 | 0 | 2 | 0 |
