= Wang Xijie (footballer) =

Chinese association football player

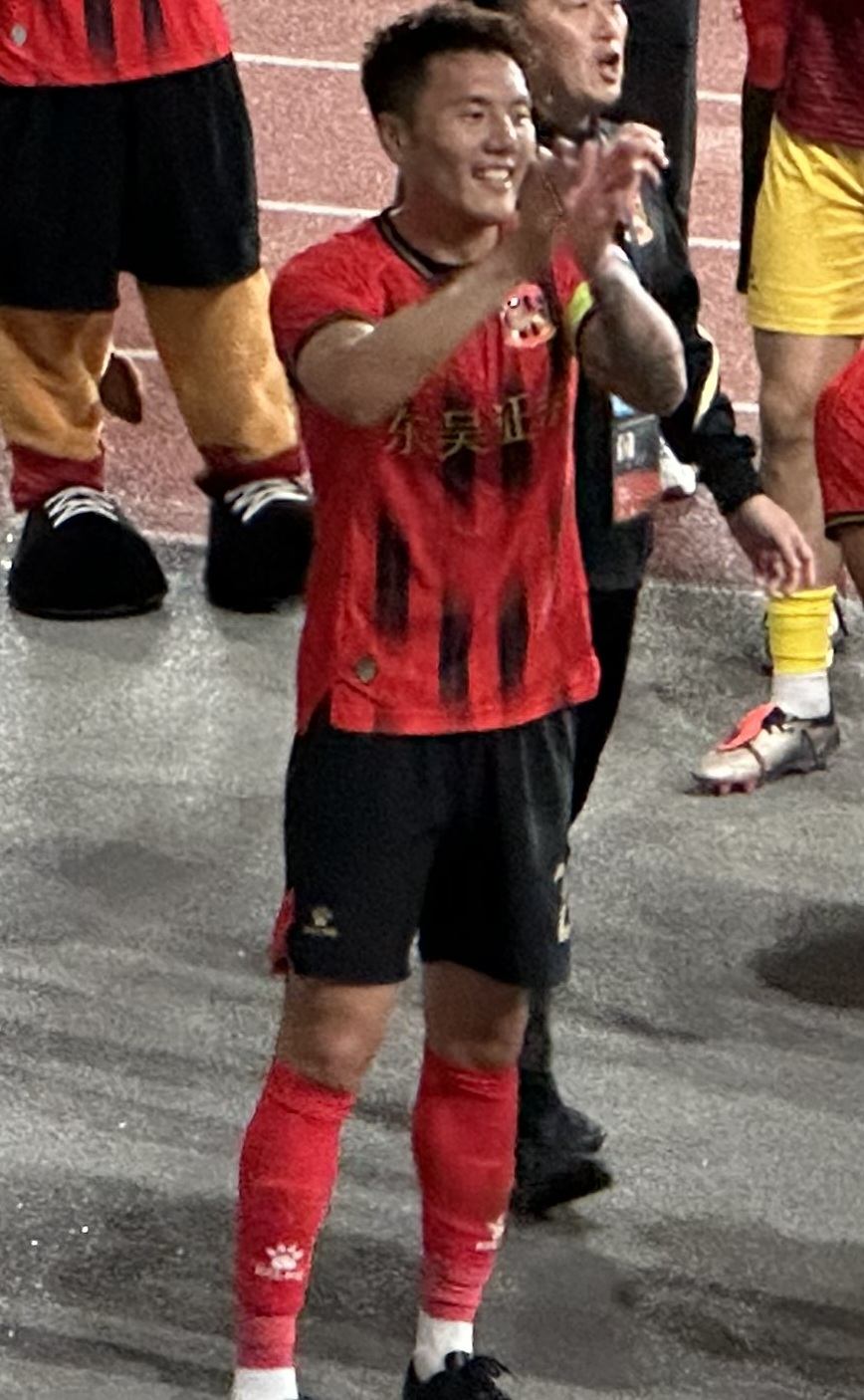
- Wang Xijie in May 2025

Personal information
- Date of birth: 14 January 1994 (age 32)
- Place of birth: Yancheng, Jiangsu, China
- Height: 1.85 m (6 ft 1 in)
- Position: Defender

Team information
- Current team: Nanjing City
- Number: 2

Youth career
- –2013: Jiangsu FA
- 2014–2015: Jiangsu Suning

Senior career*
Years	Team	Apps	(Gls)
2011	Jiangsu Youth		
2012	Jiangsu HHU		
2015–2020	Jiangsu Suning	0	(0)
2019	→ Suzhou Dongwu (loan)	11	(0)
2020–2022	Kunshan FC	37	(0)
2023–2025	Suzhou Dongwu	62	(0)
2025–	Nanjing City	13	(2)
- * Club domestic league appearances and goals as of 9 March 2026

Wang Xijie (Chinese: 王夕杰; born 14 January 1994) is a Chinese footballer currently playing as a defender for Nanjing City.

== Club career ==
Wang Xijie would start his career playing for the Jiangsu Youth while they participated within the 2011 China League Two season. He would also play for third-tier club Jiangsu HHU before joining top-tier club Jiangsu Suning where he would go on to make his debut in a Chinese FA Cup game against Guizhou Zhicheng on 13 May 2015, in a 5–1 victory. He would struggle to gain any playing time and on 1 May 2019 he was loaned out to third-tier club Suzhou Dongwu where he was part of the squad that went on to gain promotion at the end of the 2019 China League Two campaign.

On 27 August 2020 he would transfer to second-tier club Kunshan FC on a free transfer. This would be followed by his debut in a league game on 23 September 2020 against Changchun Yatai in a 1–0 victory. After the game he would go on to establish himself as regular within the team and was part of the squad that won the division and promotion to the top tier at the end of the 2022 China League One campaign.

== Career statistics ==
As of 28 June 2025.

Club	Season	League			Cup		Continental		Other		Total	
Club	Season	Division	Apps	Goals	Apps	Goals	Apps	Goals	Apps	Goals	Apps	Goals
Jiangsu Youth	2011	China League Two			-		-		-			
Jiangsu HHU	2012	China League Two			-		-		-			
Jiangsu Suning	2015	Chinese Super League	0	0	1	0	-		-		1	0
Jiangsu Suning	2016	Chinese Super League	0	0	0	0	0	0	0 (Note: Appearances in Chinese FA Super Cup)	0	0	0
Jiangsu Suning	2017	Chinese Super League	0	0	0	0	0	0	0	0	0	0
Jiangsu Suning	2018	Chinese Super League	0	0	0	0	0	0	-		0	0
Jiangsu Suning	2019	Chinese Super League	0	0	0	0	0	0	-		0	0
Jiangsu Suning	2020	Chinese Super League	0	0	0	0	0	0	-		0	0
Jiangsu Suning	Total		0	0	1	0	0	0	0	0	1	0
Suzhou Dongwu (loan)	2019	China League Two	16	0	0	0	-		-		16	0
Kunshan FC	2020	China League One	11	0	0	0	-		-		11	0
Kunshan FC	2021	China League One	20	0	1	1	-		-		21	1
Kunshan FC	2022	China League One	6	0	2	0	-		-		8	0
Kunshan FC	Total		37	0	3	1	0	0	0	0	40	1
Suzhou Dongwu	2023	China League One	25	0	1	0	-		-		26	0
Suzhou Dongwu	2024	China League One	28	0	1	0	-		-		29	0
Suzhou Dongwu	2025	China League One	9	0	1	0	-		-		10	0
Suzhou Dongwu	Total		62	0	3	1	0	0	0	0	65	0
Career total			115	0	7	1	0	0	0	0	122	1

== Honours ==
=== Club ===
Kunshan

- China League One: 2022
