= Zhang Ran =

Chinese association football player

Personal information
- Date of birth: 15 April 1999 (age 27)
- Place of birth: Beijing, China
- Height: 1.71 m (5 ft 7 in)
- Position: Defender

Team information
- Current team: Guangzhou Dandelion
- Number: 3

Youth career
- –2019: Beijing Guoan

Senior career*
Years	Team	Apps	(Gls)
2020–2022	Beijing BSU	28	(0)
2024	Shanghai Jiading Huilong	6	(0)
2024	Foshan Nanshi	6	(0)
2025	Guangxi Pingguo	11	(0)
2025	Dalian Kewei	6	(0)
2026–	Guangzhou Dandelion	0	(0)
- * Club domestic league appearances and goals as of 17 May 2024

Zhang Ran (Chinese: 张冉; born 15 April 1999) is a Chinese footballer currently playing as a defender for Guangzhou Dandelion.

== Career statistics ==
=== Club ===
As of 17 May 2024.

Club	Season	League			Cup		Other		Total	
Club	Season	Division	Apps	Goals	Apps	Goals	Apps	Goals	Apps	Goals
Beijing BSU	2020	China League One	3	0	0	0	–		3	0
Beijing BSU	2021	China League One	1	0	2 (Note: Appearances in the Chinese FA Cup)	0	–		3	0
Beijing BSU	2022	China League One	24	0	1	0	–		25	0
Beijing BSU	Total		28	0	3	0	0	0	31	0
Shanghai Jiading Huilong	2024	China League One	6	0	1	0	–		7	0
Career total			34	0	4	0	0	0	38	0
