= Chen Ao =

Chinese association football player

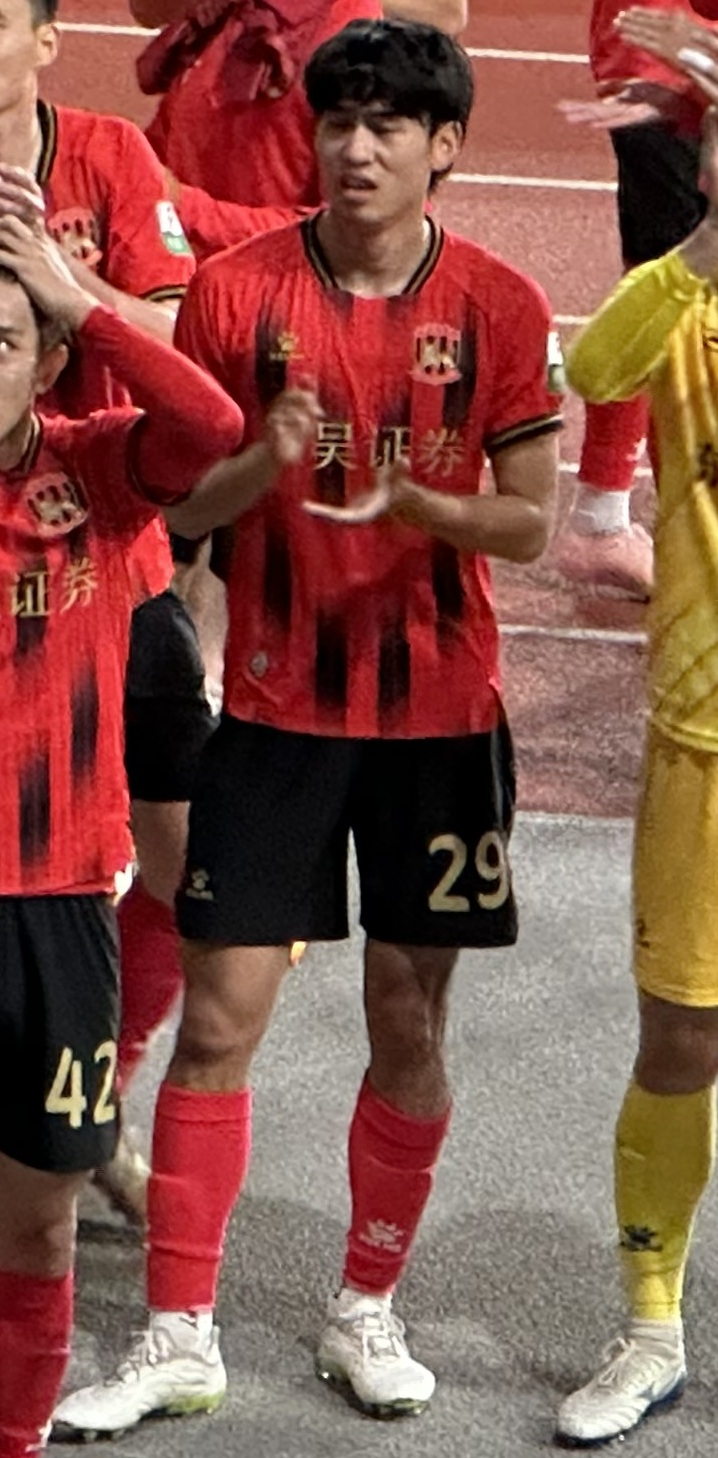
- Chen Ao in May 2025

Personal information
- Date of birth: 17 July 2000 (age 26)
- Place of birth: Deyang, Sichuan, China
- Height: 1.80 m (5 ft 11 in)
- Position: Midfielder

Team information
- Current team: Ningbo FC
- Number: 16

Youth career
- –2017: Sichuan FA
- 2017–2019: Hebei China Fortune

Senior career*
Years	Team	Apps	(Gls)
2019–2021	Hebei FC	0	(0)
2019–2020	→ Wuhan Zall (loan)	1	(0)
2021	→ Qingdao Youth Island (loan)	13	(0)
2022–2024	Qingdao West Coast	28	(0)
2024	→ Hunan Billows (loan)	23	(0)
2025–2026	Suzhou Dongwu	17	(0)
2026–	Ningbo FC	0	(0)

International career
2018–2019	China U20	14	(0)
- * Club domestic league appearances and goals as of 12:01, 23 April 2022 (UTC)

Chen Ao (simplified Chinese: 陈骜; traditional Chinese: 陳驁; pinyin: Chén Ào; born 17 July 2000) is a Chinese footballer currently playing as a midfielder for China League One club Ningbo FC.

== Club career ==
At the beginning of the 2019 Chinese Super League season Chen Ao was loaned from Hebei China Fortune to fellow top-tier club Wuhan Zall where he would make his senior debut on 1 May 2019 in a Chinese FA Cup game against Shanghai SIPG that ended in a 3–1 defeat.

On 24 June 2026, Chen joined another China League One club Ningbo FC.

== Career statistics ==
=== Club ===
As of 20 July 2021.

Club	Season	League			Cup		Continental		Other		Total	
Club	Season	Division	Apps	Goals	Apps	Goals	Apps	Goals	Apps	Goals	Apps	Goals
Hebei China Fortune	2019	Chinese Super League	0	0	0	0	–		0	0	0	0
Hebei China Fortune	2020	Chinese Super League	0	0	0	0	–		0	0	0	0
Hebei China Fortune	2021	Chinese Super League	0	0	0	0	–		0	0	0	0
Hebei China Fortune	Total		0	0	0	0	0	0	0	0	0	0
Wuhan Zall (loan)	2019	Chinese Super League	1	0	1 (Note: Appearances in the Chinese FA Cup)	0	–		–		2	0
Wuhan Zall (loan)	2020	Chinese Super League	0	0	4	0	–		0	0	4	0
Wuhan Zall (loan)	Total		1	0	5	0	0	0	0	0	6	0
Career total			1	0	5	0	0	0	0	0	6	0
