= Gong Chunjie =

Chinese association football player

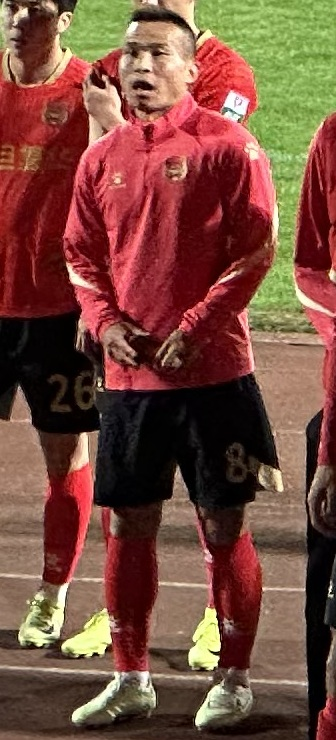
- Gong Chunjie in May 2025

Personal information
- Date of birth: 2 August 1998 (age 28)
- Place of birth: Fuyang, Anhui, China
- Height: 1.74 m (5 ft 9 in)
- Position: Right-back

Team information
- Current team: Shanghai Second
- Number: 31

Youth career
- –2018: Shanghai Port

Senior career*
Years	Team	Apps	(Gls)
2018–2019	Shanghai SIPG	0	(0)
2018-2019	→ Kunshan FC (loan)	39	(1)
2020–2022	Kunshan FC	39	(3)
2023	Tai'an Tiankuang	19	(1)
2024–	Ningbo FC	32	(0)
2026–	→ Shanghai Second (loan)	0	(0)

International career^{‡}
2014	China U16		
- * Club domestic league appearances and goals as of 14:01, 26 December 2022 (UTC) ‡ National team caps and goals as of 14:01, 20 August 2021 (UTC)

Gong Chunjie (Chinese: 龚纯洁; born 2 August 1998) is a Chinese footballer currently playing as a right-back for Shanghai Second, on loan from Ningbo FC.

== Club career ==
Gong Chunjie would be part of the Shanghai Lucky Star Youth Training program before joining Chinese Super League side Shanghai Port who loaned him out to third tier club Kunshan FC for the 2018 China League Two campaign. His loan would be extended for the following season and he would be part of the team that gained promotion to the second tier at the end of the 2019 China League Two campaign. His loan would go on to become a permanent transfer and would go on to establish himself as regular within the team that won the division and promotion to the top tier at the end of the 2022 China League One campaign.

== Career statistics ==
As of 26 December 2022.

Club	Season	League			Cup		Continental		Other		Total	
Club	Season	Division	Apps	Goals	Apps	Goals	Apps	Goals	Apps	Goals	Apps	Goals
Shanghai SIPG	2018	Chinese Super League	0	0	0	0	0	0	-		0	0
Shanghai SIPG	2019	Chinese Super League	0	0	0	0	0	0	0 (Note: Appearances in Chinese FA Super Cup)	0	0	0
Shanghai SIPG	Total		0	0	0	0	0	0	0	0	0	0
Kunshan FC (loan)	2018	China League Two	12	1	0	0	-		-		12	1
Kunshan FC (loan)	2019	China League Two	27	0	1	0	-		-		28	0
Kunshan FC (loan)	Total		39	1	1	0	0	0	0	0	40	1
Kunshan FC	2020	China League One	9	1	2	0	-		-		11	1
Kunshan FC	2021	China League One	24	2	2	0	-		-		26	2
Kunshan FC	2022	China League One	6	0	1	0	-		-		7	0
Kunshan FC	Total		39	3	5	0	0	0	0	0	44	3
Career total			78	4	6	0	0	0	0	0	84	4

== Honours ==
=== Club ===
Kunshan FC

- China League One: 2022
