= Ni Yin =

Chinese association football player

Personal information
- Date of birth: 24 January 1999 (age 27)
- Place of birth: Yangzhou, Jiangsu, China
- Height: 1.71 m (5 ft 7 in)
- Position: Midfielder

Youth career
- Villarreal
- –2019: Jiangsu Suning

Senior career*
Years	Team	Apps	(Gls)
2019–2020	Jiangsu Suning	0	(0)
2020	→ Taizhou Yuanda (loan)	8	(0)
2021	Xi'an Wolves	1	(0)
2022–2023	Nanjing City	12	(0)
2023	→ Shaoxing Shangyu Pterosaur (loan)	11	(0)

International career
2015–2016	China U17		
2020	China U21		
- * Club domestic league appearances and goals as of 14:01, 29 April 2022 (UTC)

Ni Yin (Chinese: 倪寅; born 24 January 1999) is a Chinese footballer who plays as midfielder

== Club career ==
Ni joined Xi'an Wolves as a free agent in 2021.

== Career statistics ==
As of 25 July 2021.

=== Club ===
Club	Season	League			Cup		Other		Total	
Club	Season	Division	Apps	Goals	Apps	Goals	Apps	Goals	Apps	Goals
Jiangsu Suning	2019	Chinese Super League	0	0	0	0	0	0	0	0
Jiangsu Suning	2020	Chinese Super League	0	0	0	0	0	0	0	0
Jiangsu Suning	Total		0	0	0	0	0	0	0	0
Taizhou Yuanda (loan)	2020	China League One	8	0	1 (Note: Appearances in the Chinese FA Cup)	0	0	0	9	0
Xi'an Wolves	2021	China League Two	1	0	0	0	0	0	1	0
Career total			9	0	1	0	0	0	10	0
