= Kang Zhenjie =

Chinese footballer

Kang Zhenjie 康振捷
Personal information
- Date of birth: February 25, 1993 (age 33)
- Place of birth: Hubei, China
- Height: 1.77 m (5 ft 9 1/2 in)
- Positions: Right winger; forward

Team information
- Current team: Jiangxi Liansheng
- Number: 33

Senior career*
Years	Team	Apps	(Gls)
2011–2012	Hubei Youth	16	(7)
2013–2019	Wuhan Zall	56	(2)
2019	→ Jiangxi Liansheng (loan)	26	(1)
2020–	Jiangxi Liansheng	13	(0)
- * Club domestic league appearances and goals as of 31 December 2020

Kang Zhenjie (Chinese: 康振捷; born 25 February 1993 in Hubei) is a Chinese football player who currently plays for China League One side Jiangxi Liansheng.

== Club career ==
In 2013, Kang Zhenjie started his professional footballer career with Wuhan Zall in the Chinese Super League. He would eventually make his league debut for Wuhan on 3 November 2013 in a game against Guangzhou Evergrande. On 4 March 2019, Kang was loaned to League Two side Jiangxi Liansheng for the 2019 season.

== Career statistics ==
Statistics accurate as of match played 31 December 2020.

Appearances and goals by club, season and competition
Club	Season	League			National Cup		Continental		Other		Total	
Club	Season	Division	Apps	Goals	Apps	Goals	Apps	Goals	Apps	Goals	Apps	Goals
Hubei Youth	2011	China League Two			-		-		-			
Hubei Youth	2012	China League Two	16	7			-		-		16	7
Hubei Youth	Total		16	7			0	0	0	0	16	7
Wuhan Zall	2013	Chinese Super League	1	0	0	0	-		-		1	0
Wuhan Zall	2014	China League One	10	1	1	0	-		-		11	1
Wuhan Zall	2015	China League One	20	1	1	0	-		-		21	1
Wuhan Zall	2016	China League One	8	0	0	0	-		-		8	0
Wuhan Zall	2017	China League One	11	0	1	1	-		-		12	1
Wuhan Zall	2018	China League One	6	0	2	0	-		-		8	0
Wuhan Zall	Total		56	2	5	1	0	0	0	0	61	3
Jiangxi Liansheng (loan)	2019	China League Two	26	1	2	0	-		4 (Note: Appearances in China League Two Promotion play-offs games)	0	32	1
Jiangxi Liansheng	2020	China League One	13	0	-		-		2 (Note: Appearances in China League One Relegation play-offs)	0	15	0
Career total			111	10	7	1	0	0	6	0	124	11

== Honours ==
=== Club ===
Wuhan Zall

- China League One: 2018
