= Li Haitao (footballer) =

Chinese footballer

Li Haitao 李海涛
Personal information
- Full name: Li Haitao
- Date of birth: 29 November 1995 (age 30)
- Place of birth: Lianyungang, Jiangsu, China
- Height: 1.94 m (6 ft 4 1/2 in)
- Position: Goalkeeper

Team information
- Current team: Tongji University

Youth career
- 2012–2013: Jiangsu Youth
- 2014–2016: Jiangsu Suning

Senior career*
Years	Team	Apps	(Gls)
2017–2020	Jiangsu Suning	1	(0)
2019	→ Suzhou Dongwu (loan)	0	(0)
2022-	Tongji University	0	(0)
- * Club domestic league appearances and goals as of 5 May 2022

Li Haitao (Chinese: 李海涛; born 29 November 1995) is a Chinese footballer who currently plays for Chinese club Tongji University.

== Club career ==
Li Haitao was promoted to Chinese Super League side Jiangsu Suning's first team squad by Choi Yong-soo in 2017. He made his league debut on 11 November 2018 in a 4–0 home win over Henan Jianye, coming on as a substitute for Gu Chao in the 82nd minute.

== Career statistics ==
As of 31 December 2020.

Appearances and goals by club, season and competition
Club	Season	League			National Cup		Continental		Other		Total	
Club	Season	Division	Apps	Goals	Apps	Goals	Apps	Goals	Apps	Goals	Apps	Goals
Jiangsu Suning	2017	Chinese Super League	0	0	0	0	-		0 (Note: Appearances in Chinese FA Super Cup)	0	0	0
Jiangsu Suning	2018	Chinese Super League	1	0	0	0	-		-		1	0
Jiangsu Suning	2019	Chinese Super League	0	0	0	0	-		-		0	0
Jiangsu Suning	Total		1	0	0	0	0	0	0	0	1	0
Suzhou Dongwu (loan)	2019	China League Two	0	0	0	0	-		-		0	0
Total			1	0	0	0	0	0	0	0	1	0
