= List of Chinese football transfers summer 2021 =

This is a list of Chinese football transfers for the 2021 season summer transfer window.

== Super League ==
=== Beijing Guoan ===
In:

No.	Pos.	Nation	Player
11	FW	BRA	Anderson Silva (from (Portugal) Famalicão)
29	DF	CHN	Jiang Tao (Free agent)

Out:

No.	Pos.	Nation	Player
2	DF	KOR	Kim Min-jae (to (Turkey) Fenerbahçe)
5	MF	BRA	Renato Augusto (to (Brazil) Corinthians)
21	MF	ESP	Jonathan Viera (to (Spain) Las Palmas)
30	MF	BRA	Lucas Souza (loan return to Changchun Yatai)
-	MF	BRA	Fernando (Released)

=== Cangzhou Mighty Lions ===
In:

No.	Pos.	Nation	Player
-	MF	CHN	Fang Zhiyi (from Hebei Zhuoao)

Out:

No.	Pos.	Nation	Player
9	MF	NOR	Adama Diomande (to (Qatar) Al-Sailiya)
42	MF	CHN	Sun Xuelong (to Chongqing Liangjiang Athletic)
-	MF	CHN	Chen Zeng (loan to Guangxi Pingguo Haliao)

=== Changchun Yatai ===
In:

No.	Pos.	Nation	Player
38	MF	BRA	Lucas Souza (loan return from Beijing Guoan)
-	MF	CHN	Xue Ya'nan (loan return from Hebei Zhuoao)
-	MF	CHN	Li Shangwen (loan return from Xi'an Wolves)
-	DF	CHN	Xu Xiao (loan return from Xi'an Wolves)
-	GK	CHN	Gao Yuqin (loan return from Xi'an Wolves)

Out:

No.	Pos.	Nation	Player
7	MF	CHN	Zhou Dadi (loan to Heilongjiang Ice City)
8	FW	NED	Richairo Zivkovic (to (Serbia) Red Star Belgrade)
38	MF	BRA	Lucas Souza (to (Cyprus) APOEL)
-	MF	CHN	Xue Ya'nan (loan to Qingdao Hainiu)

=== Chongqing Liangjiang Athletic ===
In:

No.	Pos.	Nation	Player
17	FW	CHN	Zhang Xiao (Free agent)
19	MF	CHN	Sun Xuelong (from Cangzhou Mighty Lions)

Out:

No.	Pos.	Nation	Player
10	FW	BRA	Marcelo Cirino (to (Brazil) Bahia)
22	FW	BRA	Marcinho (to (Japan) Kawasaki Frontale)
-	MF	CHN	He Zhitao (to Shanxi Longjin)

=== Dalian Pro ===
In:

No.	Pos.	Nation	Player
19	FW	VEN	Salomón Rondón (loan return from (Russia) CSKA Moscow)
-	MF	CHN	Liu Yingchen (loan return from Xi'an Wolves)
-	MF	CHN	Zheng Bofan (loan return from Kunshan)

Out:

No.	Pos.	Nation	Player
17	FW	CHN	Zhang Jiansheng (loan to Beijing BSU)
19	FW	VEN	Salomón Rondón (to (England) Everton)
23	GK	CHN	Li Xuebo (loan to Zibo Cuju)
27	DF	CHN	Yang Pengju (loan to Beijing BSU)
56	MF	CHN	Cheng Xianfeng (to Kunshan)
-	MF	CHN	Liu Yingchen (loan to Dandong Tengyue)
-	MF	CHN	Zheng Bofan (loan to Beijing BSU)

=== Guangzhou ===
In:

No.	Pos.	Nation	Player

Out:

No.	Pos.	Nation	Player
8	MF	BRA	Paulinho (to (Saudi Arabia) Al Ahli)
26	MF	BRA	Anderson Talisca (to (Saudi Arabia) Al Nassr)
-	DF	CHN	Chen Zepeng (to Sichuan Minzu)
-	FW	CHN	Ye Guochen (loan to Inner Mongolia Caoshangfei)
-	DF	CHN	Guan Haojin (loan to Inner Mongolia Caoshangfei)
-	DF	CHN	Zhang Zhihao (loan to Beijing BSU)
-	MF	CHN	Yang Xin (loan to Inner Mongolia Caoshangfei)
-	GK	CHN	Li Weijie (loan to Shaanxi Warriors Beyond)

=== Guangzhou City ===
In:

No.	Pos.	Nation	Player
-	DF	CHN	Zhang Fushun (loan return from Sichuan Minzu)
-	DF	CHN	Liao Jiajun (loan return from Sichuan Minzu)
-	MF	CHN	Chen Fuhai (loan return from Sichuan Minzu)

Out:

No.	Pos.	Nation	Player
13	MF	SWE	Gustav Svensson (to (Sweden) IFK Göteborg)
17	DF	CHN	Fu Yuncheng (loan to Sichuan Minzu)
28	MF	CHN	Wu Chengru (loan to Xinjiang Tianshan Leopard)
30	MF	CHN	Wang Peng (loan to Xinjiang Tianshan Leopard)
33	FW	CHN	Jin Bo (loan to Zibo Cuju)
-	DF	CHN	Zhang Fushun (loan to Hebei Zhuoao)
-	DF	CHN	Liao Jiajun (loan to Qingdao Youth Island)
-	MF	CHN	Chen Fuhai (loan to Qingdao Youth Island)

=== Hebei ===
In:

No.	Pos.	Nation	Player
4	DF	CHN	Lei Tenglong (Free agent)
23	FW	POR	João Silva (from Zibo Cuju)
45	FW	BRA	Leonardo (loan from Shandong Taishan)

Out:

No.	Pos.	Nation	Player
8	MF	BRA	Paulinho (to Shanghai Port)
10	FW	BRA	Marcão (to Wuhan Three Towns)
20	DF	CHN	Chico Chen (loan return to (Portugal) Cova da Piedade)
27	MF	CHN	Zu Pengchao (loan to Shaanxi Chang'an Athletic)
-	DF	CHN	Liu Jing (loan to Sichuan Jiuniu)
-	MF	CHN	Ren Wei (loan to Shanghai Jiading Huilong)
-	MF	CHN	Chen Ao (loan to Qingdao Youth Island)

=== Henan Songshan Longmen ===
In:

No.	Pos.	Nation	Player

Out:

No.	Pos.	Nation	Player
24	MF	CHN	Sun Longxiang (loan to Hebei Kungfu)

=== Qingdao ===
In:

No.	Pos.	Nation	Player
28	MF	GHA	Emmanuel Agyemang-Badu (Free agent)

Out:

No.	Pos.	Nation	Player
6	MF	NOR	Fredrik Ulvestad (to (Turkey) Sivasspor)
8	MF	SVN	Denis Popović (to (Cyprus) Anorthosis Famagusta)
15	MF	CHN	Wang Jianwen (loan to Shaanxi Chang'an Athletic)
49	MF	CHN	Zhang Boling (loan to Qingdao Red Lions)
-	MF	CHN	Lu Haolin (loan to Qingdao Red Lions)
-	MF	CHN	Ma Long (loan to Zibo Cuju)

=== Shandong Taishan ===
In:

No.	Pos.	Nation	Player
4	DF	BRA	Jadson (loan from (Portugal) Portimonense)

Out:

No.	Pos.	Nation	Player
9	FW	BRA	Leonardo (loan to Hebei)
22	MF	CHN	Hao Junmin (to Wuhan)
23	FW	BRA	Róger Guedes (to (Brazil) Corinthians)
42	FW	CHN	Xie Wenneng (loan to Qingdao Hainiu)
-	MF	CHN	Cao Sheng (loan to Qingdao Hainiu)
-	MF	CHN	Yi Xianlong (loan to Zhejiang)
-	FW	CHN	Shi Yan (loan to Tianjin Jinmen Tiger)
-	FW	CHN	Liu Guobao (loan to Xi'an Wolves)
-	FW	CHN	Yan Tianyi (loan to Shanxi Longjin)

=== Shanghai Port ===
In:

No.	Pos.	Nation	Player
9	MF	BRA	Paulinho (from Hebei)

Out:

No.	Pos.	Nation	Player
7	FW	AUT	Marko Arnautović (to (Italy) Bologna)
24	MF	CHN	Lei Wenjie (loan to Nantong Zhiyun)
43	DF	CHN	Wei Lai (loan to Kunshan)
45	DF	CHN	Zhu Jiayi (loan to Nanjing City)
48	DF	CHN	Zhang En'ge (loan to Dongguan United)
51	FW	CHN	Huang Zhenfei (loan to Hebei Zhuoao)

=== Shanghai Shenhua ===
In:

No.	Pos.	Nation	Player
14	FW	GUI	Lonsana Doumbouya (from Meizhou Hakka)

Out:

No.	Pos.	Nation	Player
4	DF	CHN	Jin Yangyang (loan to Tianjin Jinmen Tiger)
-	FW	CHN	Sun Xipeng (loan to Qingdao Youth Island)

=== Shenzhen ===
In:

No.	Pos.	Nation	Player
-	MF	CHN	Li Jinqing (loan return from (Spain) Villarrobledo)

Out:

No.	Pos.	Nation	Player
15	DF	CHN	Ge Zhen (loan to Meizhou Hakka)
-	MF	CHN	Li Jinqing (to (Spain) Villarrobledo)

=== Tianjin Jinmen Tiger ===
In:

No.	Pos.	Nation	Player
4	MF	CHN	Li Haoran (from (Belgium) Antwerp)
10	MF	NED	Marko Vejinović (from (Netherlands) ADO Den Haag)
12	MF	BRA	Magno Cruz (loan from Jiangxi Beidamen)
20	DF	CHN	Wang Jianan (Free agent)
21	DF	CHN	Jin Yangyang (loan from Shanghai Shenhua)
40	FW	CHN	Shi Yan (loan from Shandong Taishan)

Out:

No.	Pos.	Nation	Player
13	DF	CHN	Zhou Qiming (loan to Shanxi Longjin)
-	DF	CHN	Duan Yishuo (to Quanzhou Yassin)

=== Wuhan ===
In:

No.	Pos.	Nation	Player
28	MF	CHN	Hao Junmin (from Shandong Taishan)
32	DF	CHN	Chen Yuhao (from Shaoxing Keqiao Yuejia)
37	FW	CHN	Liu Junxian (from (Portugal) Vizela)
44	FW	BRA	Anderson Lopes (from (Japan) Hokkaido Consadole Sapporo)
-	MF	CHN	Huang Xuheng (loan return from Hubei Istar)

Out:

No.	Pos.	Nation	Player
10	FW	BRA	Léo Baptistão (to (Brazil) Santos)
25	MF	CMR	Stéphane Mbia (to (Spain) Fuenlabrada)
30	DF	POR	Daniel Carriço (to (Spain) Almería)
55	MF	CHN	Fan Xiaobin (to Quanzhou Yassin)

== League One ==
=== Beijing BIT ===
In:

No.	Pos.	Nation	Player
23	MF	CHN	Zhong Jiyu (Free agent)
39	DF	CHN	Wang Si (from Quanzhou Yassin)

Out:

No.	Pos.	Nation	Player

=== Beijing BSU ===
In:

No.	Pos.	Nation	Player
13	FW	CHN	Wang Jinze (from Inner Mongolia Caoshangfei)
19	MF	CHN	Xie Zhiwei (loan from Nanjing City)
25	GK	CHN	Jiang Hao (from Nanjing City)
26	DF	CHN	Cui Zhongkai (from Xi'an Wolves)
28	DF	CHN	Zhang Zhihao (loan from Guangzhou)
29	FW	CHN	Zhang Jiansheng (loan from Dalian Pro)
30	MF	CHN	Liu Zipeng (Free agent)
36	DF	CHN	Wang Haitao (Free agent)
38	DF	CHN	Yang Pengju (loan from Dalian Pro)
39	DF	CHN	Wang Peng (from Hebei Zhuoao)
42	MF	CHN	Zheng Bofan (loan from Dalian Pro)
44	DF	CHN	Wang Weibo (from Guizhou)

Out:

No.	Pos.	Nation	Player
8	MF	CHN	He Tongshuai (to Dongguan United)
35	MF	CHN	Mu Jiaxin (to Hebei Zhuoao)
41	DF	CHN	Tong Feige (loan to Quanzhou Yassin)
-	DF	CHN	Ma Wan (to Shaanxi Chang'an Athletic)
-	MF	CHN	Liu Tianyang (to Hebei Kungfu)

=== Chengdu Rongcheng ===
In:

No.	Pos.	Nation	Player
25	FW	CHN	Min Junlin (from Guizhou)
28	FW	BRA	Felipe (from (South Korea) Gwangju FC)
31	DF	CHN	Yang Ting (from Guizhou)
-	FW	CHN	Ma Xiaolei (loan return from Shaanxi Chang'an Athletic)
-	FW	SRB	Nikola Đurđić (loan return from Zhejiang)

Out:

No.	Pos.	Nation	Player
7	FW	BRA	Johnathan (loan to (South Korea) Gwangju FC)
33	MF	CHN	Jin Chengjun (loan to Yanbian Longding)
-	DF	CHN	Luo Xin (loan to Sichuan Minzu)
-	FW	CHN	Ma Xiaolei (loan to Sichuan Minzu)
-	FW	SRB	Nikola Đurđić (to (Sweden) Degerfors)

=== Guizhou ===
In:

No.	Pos.	Nation	Player

Out:

No.	Pos.	Nation	Player
10	MF	BRA	Sérgio Mota (Released)
18	FW	CHN	Min Junlin (to Chengdu Rongcheng)
20	DF	CHN	Yang Ting (to Chengdu Rongcheng)
44	DF	CHN	Baqyjan Hurman (to Zibo Cuju)
-	DF	CHN	Wang Weibo (to Beijing BSU)

=== Heilongjiang Ice City ===
In:

No.	Pos.	Nation	Player
13	MF	CHN	Zhou Dadi (loan from Changchun Yatai)
23	FW	GHA	Evans Etti (from (Ghana) Accra Lions)
24	DF	CHN	Chico Chen (loan from (Portugal) Cova da Piedade)
27	MF	CHN	Chen Yi (from (Portugal) Cova da Piedade)
34	MF	CHN	Xu Yang (from Zibo Cuju)
-	GK	CHN	He Zijian (from (Spain) Mar Menor)

Out:

No.	Pos.	Nation	Player
16	FW	CHN	Shao Shuai (loan to Xiamen Egret Island)
39	FW	CHN	Wang Ziming (to Guangxi Pingguo Haliao)
-	MF	CHN	Lin Tingxuan (loan to Xiamen Egret Island)

=== Jiangxi Beidamen ===
In:

No.	Pos.	Nation	Player

Out:

No.	Pos.	Nation	Player
22	MF	BRA	Magno Cruz (loan to Tianjin Jinmen Tiger)

=== Kunshan ===
In:

No.	Pos.	Nation	Player
25	FW	CHN	Liu Yuhao (Free agent)
32	DF	CHN	Wei Lai (loan from Shanghai Port)
36	MF	CHN	Cheng Xianfeng (from Dalian Pro)

Out:

No.	Pos.	Nation	Player
15	MF	CHN	Zheng Bofan (loan return to Dalian Pro)
-	GK	CHN	Zhao Tianci (to Sichuan Minzu)

=== Liaoning Shenyang Urban ===
In:

No.	Pos.	Nation	Player
-	MF	CHN	Ma Mingao (Free agent)

Out:

No.	Pos.	Nation	Player
11	FW	CHN	Qin Beichen (to Shaanxi Warriors Beyond)
17	MF	CHN	Quan Heng (to Zibo Cuju)
28	GK	CHN	Han Zhen (to Shaanxi Warriors Beyond)

=== Meizhou Hakka ===
In:

No.	Pos.	Nation	Player
6	DF	CHN	Ge Zhen (loan from Shenzhen)

Out:

No.	Pos.	Nation	Player
10	FW	GUI	Lonsana Doumbouya (to Shanghai Shenhua)
16	DF	CHN	Liu Xiaolong (loan to Guangxi Pingguo Haliao)
20	DF	CHN	Miao Ming (to Hebei Kungfu)
29	FW	CHN	Zhou Bingxu (loan to Sichuan Minzu)

=== Nanjing City ===
In:

No.	Pos.	Nation	Player
24	DF	ALB	Albi Alla (loan from Shaanxi Chang'an Athletic)
32	MF	CHN	Tao Yuan (Free agent)
35	DF	CHN	Wang Haozhi (from Hebei Zhuoao)
37	DF	LVA	Ritus Krjauklis (Free agent)
40	DF	CHN	Zhu Jiayi (loan from Shanghai Port)

Out:

No.	Pos.	Nation	Player
6	MF	CHN	Zhong Yi (loan to Sichuan Minzu)
13	MF	CHN	Tan Binliang (loan to Shanxi Longjin)
15	FW	CHN	A Xu (loan to Quanzhou Yassin)
18	MF	CHN	Xie Zhiwei (loan to Beijing BSU)
25	GK	CHN	Jiang Hao (to Beijing BSU)
36	MF	CHN	Wang Xiaole (loan to Hebei Zhuoao)
37	MF	CHN	Li Liangliang (loan to Shaoxing Keqiao Yuejia)

=== Nantong Zhiyun ===
In:

No.	Pos.	Nation	Player
36	MF	BFA	Abdou Razack Traoré (from (Turkey) Giresunspor)
39	MF	CHN	Lei Wenjie (loan from Shanghai Port)

Out:

No.	Pos.	Nation	Player

=== Shaanxi Chang'an Athletic ===
In:

No.	Pos.	Nation	Player
14	MF	CHN	Zu Pengchao (loan from Hebei)
21	MF	CHN	Wang Jianwen (loan from Qingdao)
38	DF	CHN	Ma Wan (from Beijing BSU)
-	DF	ALB	Albi Alla (loan return from Zibo Cuju)

Out:

No.	Pos.	Nation	Player
32	FW	CHN	Ma Xiaolei (loan return to Chengdu Rongcheng)
-	MF	CHN	Wang Xiaolong (Retired)
-	DF	ALB	Albi Alla (loan to Nanjing City)

=== Sichuan Jiuniu ===
In:

No.	Pos.	Nation	Player
3	DF	CHN	Long Cheng (loan from Zhejiang)
8	FW	AUS	Pierce Waring (from (Australia) Bentleigh Greens)
15	MF	CHN	Wei Jingzong (loan from Zhejiang)
16	DF	CHN	Liu Jing (loan from Hebei)
35	GK	CHN	Fan Jinming (loan from Zhejiang)

Out:

No.	Pos.	Nation	Player
33	MF	CHN	Wang Song (loan to Hebei Kungfu)
-	MF	CHN	Tan Yang (loan to Yanbian Longding)

=== Suzhou Dongwu ===
In:

No.	Pos.	Nation	Player
30	FW	COD	Junior Kabananga (Free agent)

Out:

No.	Pos.	Nation	Player

=== Wuhan Three Towns ===
In:

No.	Pos.	Nation	Player
13	FW	BRA	Marcão (from Hebei)

Out:

No.	Pos.	Nation	Player
34	DF	BRA	Jadson (loan return to (Portugal) Portimonense)
41	MF	CHN	Zhou Jinglong (loan to Yichun Grand Tiger)
-	DF	CHN	Liu Hao (loan to Yichun Grand Tiger)
-	MF	CHN	Zhang Liang (loan to Yichun Grand Tiger)
-	DF	CHN	Wang Xingqiang (loan to Qingdao Youth Island)

=== Xinjiang Tianshan Leopard ===
In:

No.	Pos.	Nation	Player
35	DF	SRB	Nemanja Spasojević (from (Serbia) Radnički Sremska Mitrovica)
36	FW	SRB	Uroš Tomović (from (Serbia) Radnički Sremska Mitrovica)
37	MF	CHN	Wu Chengru (loan from Guangzhou City)
38	MF	CHN	Wang Peng (loan from Guangzhou City)

Out:

No.	Pos.	Nation	Player

=== Zhejiang ===
In:

No.	Pos.	Nation	Player
7	MF	CRO	Franko Andrijašević (from (Belgium) Gent)
26	FW	CHN	Gao Tianyu (Free agent)
29	MF	CHN	Yi Xianlong (loan from Shandong Taishan)
44	FW	BRA	Matheus (Free agent)

Out:

No.	Pos.	Nation	Player
5	DF	CHN	Long Cheng (loan to Sichuan Jiuniu)
26	MF	CHN	Sun Haosheng (loan to Hebei Zhuoao)
29	GK	CHN	Fan Jinming (loan to Sichuan Jiuniu)
40	FW	SRB	Nikola Đurđić (loan return to Chengdu Rongcheng)
-	MF	CHN	Wei Jingzong (loan to Sichuan Jiuniu)
-	FW	CHN	He Jian (loan to Hebei Zhuoao)

=== Zibo Cuju ===
In:

No.	Pos.	Nation	Player
24	MF	CHN	Quan Heng (from Liaoning Shenyang Urban)
30	MF	CHN	Ma Long (loan from Qingdao)
32	GK	CHN	Li Xuebo (loan from Dalian Pro)
37	FW	CHN	Jin Bo (loan from Guangzhou City)
41	DF	CHN	Baqyjan Hurman (from Guizhou)
42	MF	CHN	Rong Linzhao (from Shaanxi Warriors Beyond)

Out:

No.	Pos.	Nation	Player
6	DF	ALB	Albi Alla (loan return to Shaanxi Chang'an Athletic)
18	MF	CHN	Xu Yang (to Heilongjiang Ice City)
29	DF	CHN	Wang Yiming (to Dandong Tengyue)
39	FW	POR	João Silva (to Hebei)
45	MF	CHN	Liu Heng (to Dandong Tengyue)

== League Two ==
=== Dandong Tengyue ===
In:

No.	Pos.	Nation	Player
9	MF	CHN	Wang Feike (loan from Xi'an Wolves)
15	DF	CHN	Wang Yiming (from Zibo Cuju)
16	MF	CHN	Liu Yingchen (loan from Dalian Pro)
19	MF	CHN	Liu Heng (from Zibo Cuju)
24	MF	CHN	Xu Liao (loan from Xi'an Wolves)
27	GK	CHN	Wang Xiang (Free agent)
28	GK	CHN	Pan Qihao (Free agent)
36	DF	CHN	Yang Yuchao (from Qinghai Renhaixi)
49	MF	CHN	Sun Mingxiang (Free agent)
52	GK	CHN	Wang Zishuo (Free agent)

Out:

No.	Pos.	Nation	Player
32	DF	CHN	Zhang Song (to Shanxi Longjin)

=== Dongguan United ===
In:

No.	Pos.	Nation	Player
5	MF	CHN	Luo Tian (loan from Guangxi Pingguo Haliao)
6	MF	CHN	He Tongshuai (from Beijing BSU)
12	DF	CHN	Zhang En'ge (loan from Shanghai Port)

Out:

No.	Pos.	Nation	Player

=== Guangxi Pingguo Haliao ===
In:

No.	Pos.	Nation	Player
8	MF	CHN	Chen Zeng (loan from Cangzhou Mighty Lions)
23	FW	CHN	Wang Ziming (from Heilongjiang Ice City)
24	GK	CHN	Jia Xinyao (from Shaanxi Warriors Beyond)
31	DF	CHN	Liu Xiaolong (loan from Meizhou Hakka)
39	MF	CHN	Cui Jiaqi (from Hebei Zhuoao)

Out:

No.	Pos.	Nation	Player
5	MF	CHN	Luo Tian (loan to Dongguan United)

=== Hebei Kungfu ===
In:

No.	Pos.	Nation	Player
16	DF	CHN	Wang Xin (from Meizhou Qiuxiang)
20	MF	CHN	Wang Pan (from Hebei Zhuoao)
23	MF	CHN	Liu Tianyang (from Beijing BSU)
27	FW	CHN	Shi Jun (from Kunming Zheng He Shipman)
28	DF	CHN	Sui Donglu (Free agent)
29	MF	CHN	Wang Song (loan from Sichuan Jiuniu)
34	DF	CHN	Miao Ming (from Meizhou Hakka)
52	MF	CHN	Zhang Kaiyang (Free agent)
55	MF	CHN	Du Xinpeng (Free agent)
56	MF	CHN	Sun Longxiang (loan from Henan Songshan Longmen)
57	MF	CHN	He Yuchen (loan from Kunming Zheng He Shipman)

Out:

No.	Pos.	Nation	Player
15	MF	CHN	Wang Xintian (loan to Kunming Zheng He Shipman)

=== Hebei Zhuoao ===
In:

No.	Pos.	Nation	Player
10	MF	CHN	Wang Xiaole (loan from Nanjing City)
24	FW	CHN	He Jian (loan from Zhejiang)
35	FW	CHN	Huang Zhenfei (loan from Shanghai Port)
36	MF	CHN	Sun Haosheng (loan from Zhejiang)
55	DF	CHN	Zhang Fushun (loan from Guangzhou City)
56	MF	CHN	Mu Jiaxin (from Beijing BSU)

Out:

No.	Pos.	Nation	Player
7	FW	CHN	Xiao Zhi (to Qingdao Hainiu)
11	MF	CHN	Xue Ya'nan (loan return to Changchun Yatai)
14	MF	CHN	Wang Pan (to Hebei Kungfu)
16	DF	CHN	Wang Peng (to Beijing BSU)
21	MF	CHN	Cui Jiaqi (to Guangxi Pingguo Haliao)
22	DF	CHN	Sun Gang (to Hubei Istar)
28	DF	CHN	Wang Haozhi (to Nanjing City)
30	DF	CHN	Li Siqi (loan to Yanbian Longding)
58	MF	CHN	Fang Zhiyi (to Cangzhou Mighty Lions)

=== Hubei Istar ===
In:

No.	Pos.	Nation	Player
7	DF	CHN	Sun Gang (from Hebei Zhuoao)
8	MF	CHN	Aysan Kadir (Free agent)
11	FW	CHN	Huang Junyi (Free agent)
22	MF	CHN	Zeng Qingshen (loan from Hunan Billows)
65	MF	CHN	Lobsang Khedrup (from (Portugal) Gondomar)
67	MF	CHN	Cao Xujie (Free agent)
68	DF	CHN	Wu Tianlong (Free agent)
69	DF	CHN	Zhang Yixuan (Free agent)
72	MF	CHN	Sherzat Nur (Free agent)
-	MF	CHN	Li Biao (loan return from Kunming Zheng He Shipman)

Out:

No.	Pos.	Nation	Player
62	MF	CHN	Huang Xuheng (loan return to Wuhan)
-	MF	CHN	Li Biao (to Kunming Zheng He Shipman)

=== Hunan Billows ===
In:

No.	Pos.	Nation	Player

Out:

No.	Pos.	Nation	Player
5	DF	CHN	Wu Haitian (to Shanghai Jiading Huilong)
8	MF	CHN	Zeng Qingshen (loan to Hubei Istar)

=== Inner Mongolia Caoshangfei ===
In:

No.	Pos.	Nation	Player
2	DF	CHN	Yan Xinyu (Free agent)
13	FW	CHN	Ye Guochen (loan from Guangzhou)
20	MF	CHN	Wang Junhui (Free agent)
27	MF	CHN	Yang Xin (loan from Guangzhou)
32	DF	CHN	Guan Haojin (loan from Guangzhou)

Out:

No.	Pos.	Nation	Player
14	FW	CHN	Ci Tian (to Shaoxing Keqiao Yuejia)

=== Kunming Zheng He Shipman ===
In:

No.	Pos.	Nation	Player
1	GK	CHN	Chen Jinming (Free agent)
5	MF	CHN	Li Biao (from Hubei Istar)
15	MF	CHN	Wang Xintian (loan from Hebei Kungfu)

Out:

No.	Pos.	Nation	Player
5	MF	CHN	Li Biao (loan return to Hubei Istar)
33	FW	CHN	Shi Jun (to Hebei Kungfu)
43	MF	CHN	He Yuchen (loan to Hebei Kungfu)
44	DF	CHN	Imamhesen Ababekri (to Shaanxi Warriors Beyond)

=== Qingdao Hainiu ===
In:

No.	Pos.	Nation	Player
4	MF	CHN	Xue Ya'nan (loan from Changchun Yatai)
7	FW	CHN	Xiao Zhi (from Hebei Zhuoao)
12	MF	CHN	Cao Sheng (loan from Shandong Taishan)
41	FW	CHN	Xie Wenneng (loan from Shandong Taishan)

Out:

No.	Pos.	Nation	Player

=== Qingdao Red Lions ===
In:

No.	Pos.	Nation	Player
15	MF	CHN	Zhang Boling (loan from Qingdao)
28	MF	CHN	Lu Haolin (loan from Qingdao)

Out:

No.	Pos.	Nation	Player

=== Qingdao Youth Island ===
In:

No.	Pos.	Nation	Player
13	MF	CHN	Chen Fuhai (loan from Guangzhou City)
17	FW	CHN	Sun Xipeng (loan from Shanghai Shenhua)
20	DF	CHN	Wang Xingqiang (loan from Wuhan Three Towns)
40	MF	CHN	Chen Ao (loan from Hebei)
47	DF	CHN	Liao Jiajun (loan from Guangzhou City)

Out:

No.	Pos.	Nation	Player

=== Quanzhou Yassin ===
In:

No.	Pos.	Nation	Player
6	MF	CHN	Fan Xiaobin (from Wuhan)
18	MF	CHN	Cui Jing (loan from Xiamen Egret Island)
25	FW	CHN	A Xu (loan from Nanjing City)
32	GK	CHN	Zhang Xunwei (from Jiangsu Codion)
41	DF	CHN	Duan Yishuo (from Tianjin Jinmen Tiger)
61	DF	CHN	Tong Feige (loan from Beijing BSU)

Out:

No.	Pos.	Nation	Player
16	DF	CHN	Wang Si (to Beijing BIT)

=== Shaanxi Warriors Beyond ===
In:

No.	Pos.	Nation	Player
21	FW	CHN	Qin Beichen (from Liaoning Shenyang Urban)
25	DF	CHN	Meng Xiangqi (from Zhuhai Qinao)
34	GK	CHN	Han Zhen (from Liaoning Shenyang Urban)
41	GK	CHN	Li Weijie (loan from Guangzhou)
45	DF	CHN	Imamhesen Ababekri (from Kunming Zheng He Shipman)
52	MF	CHN	Hao Yujie (Free agent)
-	GK	CHN	He Zijian (from Heilongjiang Ice City)

Out:

No.	Pos.	Nation	Player
12	GK	CHN	Jia Xinyao (to Guangxi Pingguo Haliao)
23	FW	CHN	Xu Xin (to Sichuan Minzu)

=== Shanghai Jiading Huilong ===
In:

No.	Pos.	Nation	Player
6	DF	CHN	Wu Haitian (from Hunan Billows)
14	DF	CHN	Liu Shuai (Free agent)
22	MF	CHN	Ren Wei (loan from Hebei)
45	MF	CHN	Zhu Yang (from Sichuan Minzu)
51	FW	CHN	Lu Jiabin (from Sichuan Minzu)

Out:

No.	Pos.	Nation	Player
17	MF	CHN	Yin Changji (to Yanbian Longding)
34	DF	CHN	Jiang Yinghao (to Xiamen Egret Island)

=== Shanxi Longjin ===
In:

No.	Pos.	Nation	Player
30	DF	CHN	Zhang Song (from Dandong Tengyue)
31	DF	CHN	Zhou Qiming (loan from Tianjin Jinmen Tiger)
33	DF	CHN	Ma Chongchong (Free agent)
37	MF	CHN	Tan Binliang (loan from Nanjing City)
47	FW	CHN	Yan Tianyi (loan from Shandong Taishan)
48	MF	CHN	He Zhitao (from Chongqing Liangjiang Athletic)

Out:

No.	Pos.	Nation	Player

=== Shaoxing Keqiao Yuejia ===
In:

No.	Pos.	Nation	Player
7	FW	CHN	Ci Tian (from Inner Mongolia Caoshangfei)
15	MF	CHN	Li Shuai (Free agent)
22	DF	CHN	Zhang Yan (from (Portugal) Oriental Dragon)
27	MF	CHN	Li Liangliang (loan from Nanjing City)
32	GK	CHN	Lai Xiaoyu (Free agent)

Out:

No.	Pos.	Nation	Player
-	DF	CHN	Chen Yuhao (to Wuhan)

=== Sichuan Minzu ===
In:

No.	Pos.	Nation	Player
12	MF	CHN	Zhong Yi (loan from Nanjing City)
18	DF	CHN	Chen Zepeng (from Guangzhou)
20	DF	CHN	Fu Yuncheng (loan from Guangzhou City)
27	FW	CHN	Zhou Bingxu (loan from Meizhou Hakka)
32	FW	CHN	Ma Xiaolei (loan from Chengdu Rongcheng)
33	FW	CHN	Xu Xin (from Shaanxi Warriors Beyond)
39	GK	CHN	Zhao Tianci (from Kunshan)
59	DF	CHN	Luo Xin (loan from Chengdu Rongcheng)

Out:

No.	Pos.	Nation	Player
13	MF	CHN	Chen Fuhai (loan return to Guangzhou City)
47	DF	CHN	Liao Jiajun (loan return to Guangzhou City)
49	MF	CHN	Zhu Yang (to Shanghai Jiading Huilong)
50	DF	CHN	Lu Jiabin (to Shanghai Jiading Huilong)
55	DF	CHN	Zhang Fushun (loan return to Guangzhou City)

=== Wuxi Wugou ===
In:

No.	Pos.	Nation	Player
37	MF	CHN	Li Haoran (Free agent)

Out:

No.	Pos.	Nation	Player

=== Xi'an Wolves ===
In:

No.	Pos.	Nation	Player
26	DF	CHN	Shi Jiwei (Free agent)
34	MF	CHN	Yu Wenhe (Free agent)
36	MF	CHN	Gao Zengxiang (Free agent)
37	DF	CHN	Liu Tianqi (Free agent)
43	FW	CHN	Liu Guobao (loan from Shandong Taishan)

Out:

No.	Pos.	Nation	Player
7	DF	CHN	Cui Zhongkai (to Beijing BSU)
8	MF	CHN	Li Shangwen (loan return to Changchun Yatai)
13	MF	CHN	Wang Feike (loan to Dandong Tengyue)
24	DF	CHN	Xu Xiao (loan return to Changchun Yatai)
32	MF	CHN	Xu Liao (loan to Dandong Tengyue)
41	GK	CHN	Gao Yuqin (loan return to Changchun Yatai)

=== Xiamen Egret Island ===
In:

No.	Pos.	Nation	Player
20	MF	CHN	Wu Qingsong (from Yanbian Longding)
28	FW	CHN	Shao Shuai (loan from Heilongjiang Ice City)
34	DF	CHN	Jiang Yinghao (from Shanghai Jiading Huilong)
55	MF	CHN	Luo Yuheng (from Ulanqab Qile)
60	MF	CHN	Lin Tingxuan (loan from Heilongjiang Ice City)

Out:

No.	Pos.	Nation	Player
1	GK	CHN	Zhang Luhao (loan to Yanbian Longding)
18	MF	CHN	Cui Jing (loan to Quanzhou Yassin)

=== Yanbian Longding ===
In:

No.	Pos.	Nation	Player
6	DF	CHN	Zheng Chunfeng (Free agent)
7	DF	CHN	Li Qiang (Free agent)
9	MF	CHN	Tan Yang (loan from Sichuan Jiuniu)
15	MF	CHN	Jin Zhengcheng (from Qingdao Kunpeng)
17	MF	CHN	Yin Changji (from Shanghai Jiading Huilong)
18	MF	CHN	Jin Chengjun (loan from Chengdu Rongcheng)
24	GK	CHN	Zhang Luhao (loan from Xiamen Egret Island)
29	DF	CHN	Li Siqi (loan from Hebei Zhuoao)
58	MF	CHN	Ilaldin Abdugheni (Free agent)

Out:

No.	Pos.	Nation	Player
10	MF	CHN	Wu Qingsong (to Xiamen Egret Island)

=== Yichun Grand Tiger ===
In:

No.	Pos.	Nation	Player
17	MF	CHN	Zhang Liang (loan from Wuhan Three Towns)
33	DF	CHN	Liu Hao (loan from Wuhan Three Towns)
41	MF	CHN	Zhou Jinglong (loan from Wuhan Three Towns)

Out:

No.	Pos.	Nation	Player
