= 2020 Chinese Champions League =

Chinese Champions League
- Season: 2020
- Dates: 21 – 30 November 2020
- Champions: Guangdong Lianghetang
- Promoted: Guangdong Lianghetang; Xiamen Qudian; Sichuan Huakun; Yichun Jiangxi Tungsten Grand Tiger; Hebei Jingying Zhihai; Wuxi Xinje; Quanzhou Addarmour; Yanbian Hailanjiang; Dandong Hantong

The 2020 Chinese Champions League, officially known as the SWM Motors 2020 Chinese Football Association Member Association Champions League (Chinese: SWM斯威汽车2020中国足球协会会员协会冠军联赛) for sponsorship reasons, was the 19th season since its establishment in 2002. The season was postponed following the COVID-19 pandemic, and canceled Regional Competition stage. On 3 November 2020, Chinese Football Association announced that the season would start on 21 November 2020 and conclude on 30 November 2020.

== Promotion and relegation ==
=== From Champions League ===
Teams promoted to China League Two

- Nanjing Fengfan
- Shenzhen Bogang
- Xi'an UKD
- Shanghai Jiading Boji
- Qingdao Zhongchuang Hengtai

Teams relegated to CFA member associations leagues / cups or lower tiers

All other teams from last season relegated to tier 5 or lower.

=== To Champions League ===
Teams promoted from 15 CFA member associations leagues and 1 host team.

== Qualified teams ==
Team	Football association	Qualified regional league (Tier 6)	Qualified season	Position	Last season record	Note
Guangdong Lianghetang	Guangdong FA	Guangdong Super League	2019-20	1	–	
Meixian 433	Meizhou FA	–	–	–	–	Host
Qinghai Oulu International	Qinghai FA	CMCL Qinghai Region	2020	1	–	
Xiamen Qudian	Xiamen FA	–	–	–	–	Qualified position of Xiamen Dongyuhang
Liuzhou Ranko	Guangxi FA	Guangxi Super League	2019	1	CMCL Regional Group A, 3rd	
Yanbian Hailanjiang	Yanbian FA	–	–	–	CMCL Finals, 16th	Recommendation
Hubei Huachuang	Wuhan FA	–	–	–	CMCL Finals, 6th	Recommendation
Hebei Jingying Zhihai	Hebei FA	Hebei FA Amateur League	2020	1	–	
Wuxi Xinje	Jiangsu FA	Jiangsu FA Championship League	2019	1	–	
Yichun Jiangxi Tungsten Grand Tiger	Jiangxi FA	Jiangxi League	2019	1	–	
Sichuan Huakun	Sichuan FA	Sichuan Amateur League	2019	–	–	Qualified position of Zigong Xuyuan
Shanxi Zhisheng	Shanxi FA	Shanxi FA Super League	2019	1	CMCL Regional Group C, 4th	
Quanzhou Addarmour	Fujian FA	Fujian FA Super League	2019	1	–	
Dandong Hantong	Liaoning FA	Liaoning FA Super League	2020	1	CMCL Finals, 11th	
Ningxiaren Haixi	Ningxia FA	Ningxia FA Super League	2020	1	–	
Jinan Xingzhou	Shandong FA	Shandong Amateur Super League	2019	1	–	

== Hengbei Football Town Group ==
=== Group A ===
Pos	Team	Pld	W	D	L	GF	GA	GD	Pts	Qualification or relegation
1	Guangdong Lianghetang (Q, C, P)	3	3	0	0	6	2	+4	9	Qualification for Semi-finals
2	Yanbian Hailanjiang (Q, P)	3	1	0	2	4	5	−1	3	Qualification for Semi-finals
3	Jinan Xingzhou	3	1	0	2	2	3	−1	3	
4	Shanxi Zhisheng	3	1	0	2	1	3	−2	3	

Rules for classification:
- During season: 1) Points; 2) Goal difference; 3) Goals scored.
- After season: 1) Points; 2) Head-to-head points; 3) Head-to-head goal difference; 4) Head-to-head goals scored; 5) Scores of the weight ratio of the reserve league and youth leagues.

21 November 2020	Jinan Xingzhou	0–1	Guangdong Lianghetang	Hengbei Football Town Field 9, Meizhou
12:00 UTC+8				Referee: Ma Yunkun

21 November 2020	Yanbian Hailanjiang	0–1	Shanxi Zhisheng	Hengbei Football Town Field 11, Meizhou
12:00 UTC+8				Referee: Liu Shaocheng

23 November 2020	Guangdong Lianghetang	3–2	Yanbian Hailanjiang	Hengbei Football Town Field 9, Meizhou
15:00 UTC+8				Referee: Dan Ning

23 November 2020	Shanxi Zhisheng	0–1	Jinan Xingzhou	Hengbei Football Town Field 11, Meizhou
15:00 UTC+8				Referee: Gao Peng

25 November 2020	Shanxi Zhisheng	0–2	Guangdong Lianghetang	Hengbei Football Town Field 9, Meizhou
12:00 UTC+8				Referee: Liu Xindong

25 November 2020	Jinan Xingzhou	1–2	Yanbian Hailanjiang	Hengbei Football Town Field 11, Meizhou
12:00 UTC+8				Referee: Liu Shaocheng

=== Group B ===
Pos	Team	Pld	W	D	L	GF	GA	GD	Pts	Qualification or relegation
1	Sichuan Huakun (Q, P)	3	2	1	0	5	3	+2	7	Qualification for Semi-finals
2	Quanzhou Addarmour (Q, P)	3	1	2	0	7	6	+1	5	Qualification for Semi-finals
3	Dandong Hantong (P)	3	1	1	1	5	3	+2	4	
4	Liuzhou Ranko	3	0	0	3	1	6	−5	0	

Rules for classification:
- During season: 1) Points; 2) Goal difference; 3) Goals scored.
- After season: 1) Points; 2) Head-to-head points; 3) Head-to-head goal difference; 4) Head-to-head goals scored; 5) Scores of the weight ratio of the reserve league and youth leagues.

21 November 2020	Liuzhou Ranko	0–1	Sichuan Huakun	Hengbei Football Town Field 9, Meizhou
15:00 UTC+8				Referee: Zhang Chao

21 November 2020	Dandong Hantong	2–2	Quanzhou Addarmour	Hengbei Football Town Field 11, Meizhou
15:00 UTC+8				Referee: Cui Yueqiang

23 November 2020	Sichuan Huakun	1–0	Dandong Hantong	Hengbei Football Town Field 9, Meizhou
12:00 UTC+8				Referee: Zhang Kuan

23 November 2020	Quanzhou Addarmour	2–1	Liuzhou Ranko	Hengbei Football Town Field 11, Meizhou
12:00 UTC+8				Referee: Lei Xu

25 November 2020	Quanzhou Addarmour	3–3	Sichuan Huakun	Hengbei Football Town Field 9, Meizhou
15:00 UTC+8				Referee: Zhang Chao

25 November 2020	Liuzhou Ranko	0–3	Dandong Hantong	Hengbei Football Town Field 11, Meizhou
15:00 UTC+8				Referee: Wang Haidong

=== Semi-finals ===
==== Overview ====
Team 1	Score	Team 2
Guangdong Lianghetang	3–0	Quanzhou Addarmour
Sichuan Huakun	1–1 (5–4 p)	Yanbian Hailanjiang

==== Matches ====
27 November 2020	Guangdong Lianghetang	3–0	Quanzhou Addarmour	Hengbei Football Town Field 9, Meizhou
13:00 UTC+8				Referee: Ma Yunkun

27 November 2020	Sichuan Huakun	1–1 (5–4 p)	Yanbian Hailanjiang	Hengbei Football Town Field 11, Meizhou
15:00 UTC+8				Referee: Gao Peng

=== Final ===
==== Overview ====
Team 1	Score	Team 2
Guangdong Lianghetang	1–0	Sichuan Huakun

==== Match ====
29 November 2020	Guangdong Lianghetang	1–0	Sichuan Huakun	Hengbei Football Town Field 9, Meizhou
15:00 UTC+8				Referee: Liu Shaocheng

== R&F Football School Group ==
=== Group C ===
Pos	Team	Pld	W	D	L	GF	GA	GD	Pts	Qualification or relegation
1	Hebei Jingying Zhihai (Q, P)	3	2	1	0	4	1	+3	7	Qualification for Semi-finals
2	Wuxi Xinje (Q, P)	3	2	0	1	2	2	0	6	Qualification for Semi-finals
3	Hubei Huachuang	3	1	0	2	4	5	−1	3	
4	Qinghai Oulu International	3	0	1	2	2	4	−2	1	

Rules for classification:
- During season: 1) Points; 2) Goal difference; 3) Goals scored.
- After season: 1) Points; 2) Head-to-head points; 3) Head-to-head goal difference; 4) Head-to-head goals scored; 5) Scores of the weight ratio of the reserve league and youth leagues.

22 November 2020	Hubei Huachuang	1–2	Hebei Jingying Zhihai	R&F Football School Field 1, Meizhou
12:00 UTC+8				Referee: Ding Chao

22 November 2020	Qinghai Oulu International	0–1	Wuxi Xinje	R&F Football School Field 2, Meizhou
12:00 UTC+8				Referee: Zhang Yangfan

24 November 2020	Hebei Jingying Zhihai	0–0	Qinghai Oulu International	R&F Football School Field 1, Meizhou
15:00 UTC+8				Referee: Mu Fupeng

24 November 2020	Wuxi Xinje	1–0	Hubei Huachuang	R&F Football School Field 2, Meizhou
15:00 UTC+8				Referee: Zhang Chao

26 November 2020	Wuxi Xinje	0–2	Hebei Jingying Zhihai	R&F Football School Field 1, Meizhou
12:00 UTC+8				Referee: Ding Chao

26 November 2020	Hubei Huachuang	3–2	Qinghai Oulu International	R&F Football School Field 2, Meizhou
12:00 UTC+8				Referee: Zhang Yangfan

=== Group D ===
Pos	Team	Pld	W	D	L	GF	GA	GD	Pts	Qualification or relegation
1	Xiamen Qudian (Q, P)	3	2	1	0	12	2	+10	7	Qualification for Semi-finals
2	Yichun Jiangxi Tungsten Grand Tiger (Q, P)	3	1	1	1	5	4	+1	4	Qualification for Semi-finals
3	Meixian 433	3	1	0	2	9	9	0	3	
4	Ningxiaren Haixi	3	1	0	2	1	12	−11	3	

Updated to match(es) played on 24 November 2020. Source:
Rules for classification:
- During season: 1) Points; 2) Goal difference; 3) Goals scored.
- After season: 1) Points; 2) Head-to-head points; 3) Head-to-head goal difference; 4) Head-to-head goals scored; 5) Scores of the weight ratio of the reserve league and youth leagues.

22 November 2020	Yichun Jiangxi Tungsten Grand Tiger	0–1	Ningxiaren Haixi	R&F Football School Field 1, Meizhou
15:00 UTC+8				Referee: Han Lei

22 November 2020	Meixian 433	1–5	Xiamen Qudian	R&F Football School Field 2, Meizhou
15:00 UTC+8				Referee: Cui Yong

24 November 2020	Ningxiaren Haixi	0–6	Meixian 433	R&F Football School Field 1, Meizhou
12:00 UTC+8				Referee: Lin Jun

24 November 2020	Xiamen Qudian	1–1	Yichun Jiangxi Tungsten Grand Tiger	R&F Football School Field 2, Meizhou
12:00 UTC+8				Referee: Liang Ming

26 November 2020	Xiamen Qudian	6–0	Ningxiaren Haixi	R&F Football School Field 1, Meizhou
15:00 UTC+8				Referee: Cui Yong

26 November 2020	Yichun Jiangxi Tungsten Grand Tiger	4–2	Meixian 433	R&F Football School Field 2, Meizhou
15:00 UTC+8				Referee: Han Lei

=== Semi-finals ===
==== Overview ====
Team 1	Score	Team 2
Hebei Jingying Zhihai	1–2	Yichun Jiangxi Tungsten Grand Tiger
Xiamen Qudian	2–0	Wuxi Xinje

==== Matches ====
28 November 2020	Hebei Jingying Zhihai	1–2	Yichun Jiangxi Tungsten Grand Tiger	R&F Football School Field 1, Meizhou
13:00 UTC+8				Referee: Lin Jun

28 November 2020	Xiamen Qudian	2–0	Wuxi Xinje	R&F Football School Field 2, Meizhou
15:00 UTC+8				Referee: Han Lei

=== Final ===
==== Overview ====
Team 1	Score	Team 2
Yichun Jiangxi Tungsten Grand Tiger	1–3	Xiamen Qudian

==== Match ====
30 November 2020	Yichun Jiangxi Tungsten Grand Tiger	1–3	Xiamen Qudian	R&F Football School Field 1, Meizhou
14:00 UTC+8				Referee: Cui Yong
