= Zhou Qiming =

Chinese footballer

Zhou Qiming 周其明
Personal information
- Full name: Zhou Qiming
- Date of birth: 24 July 1994 (age 32)
- Place of birth: Chengdu, Sichuan, China
- Height: 1.75 m (5 ft 9 in)
- Position: Defender

Team information
- Current team: Quanzhou Yassin

Youth career
- Mingyu Football School
- 2007–2012: Tianjin Teda

Senior career*
Years	Team	Apps	(Gls)
2013–2019	Tianjin Teda	7	(0)
2020	Sichuan Minzu		
2021	Tianjin Jinmen Tiger	0	(0)
2021	→ Shanxi Longjin (loan)	17	(0)
2022-	Quanzhou Yassin	0	(0)
- * Club domestic league appearances and goals as of 5 May 2022

Zhou Qiming (Chinese: 周其明; born 24 July 1994) is a Chinese professional football player as a defender for Quanzhou Yassin.

== Club career ==
Zhou Qiming started his professional footballer career with Chinese Super League side Tianjin Teda in 2013. He would eventually make his league debut for Tianjin Teda on 28 September 2014 in a game against Henan Jianye. He played for the reserved team in 2015 and 2016 league season.

== Career statistics ==
Statistics accurate as of match played 31 December 2020.

Club	Season	League			Cup		Continental		Other		Total	
Club	Season	Division	Apps	Goals	Apps	Goals	Apps	Goals	Apps	Goals	Apps	Goals
Tianjin Teda	2013	Chinese Super League	0	0	1	0	-		-		1	0
Tianjin Teda	2014	Chinese Super League	2	0	0	0	-		-		2	0
Tianjin Teda	2017	Chinese Super League	3	0	0	0	-		-		3	0
Tianjin Teda	2018	Chinese Super League	1	0	0	0	-		-		1	0
Tianjin Teda	2019	Chinese Super League	0	0	0	0	-		-		0	0
Tianjin Teda	Total		6	0	1	0	0	0	0	0	7	0
Sichuan Everglory	2020	Chinese Champions League	-		-		-		-		-	-
Career total			6	0	1	0	0	0	0	0	7	0
