= Shao Shuai =

Shao Shuai may refer to:

- Shao Shuai (footballer, born 1989), Chinese footballer
- Shao Shuai (footballer, born 1997), Chinese footballer
