= Shi Jinshuai =

Chinese association football player

Personal information
- Date of birth: 29 January 1999 (age 27)
- Place of birth: Shijiazhuang, Hebei, China
- Height: 1.75 m (5 ft 9 in)
- Position: Midfielder

Team information
- Current team: Hunan HBS Mangguoba

Youth career
- Villarreal
- –2021: Guangzhou

Senior career*
Years	Team	Apps	(Gls)
2021	Hunan Billows	19	(1)
2022-	Hunan HBS Mangguoba	0	(0)
- * Club domestic league appearances and goals as of 14:01, 17 May 2022 (UTC)

Shi Jinshuai (Chinese: 史金帅; born 29 January 1999) is a Chinese footballer currently playing as a midfielder for Chinese club Hunan HBS Mangguoba.

== Club career ==
Shi scored his first goal for Hunan Billows in 2021 against Xiamen Egret Island.

== Career statistics ==
=== Club ===
As of 25 July 2021.

Club	Season	League			Cup		Continental		Other		Total	
Club	Season	Division	Apps	Goals	Apps	Goals	Apps	Goals	Apps	Goals	Apps	Goals
Hunan Billows	2021	China League Two	12	1	0	0	–		0	0	12	1
Career total			12	1	0	0	0	0	0	0	12	1
