= Zhang Zhihao =

Zhang Zhihao may refer to:

- Chang Chih-hao (born 1987), Taiwanese baseball player
- Zhang Zhihao (footballer) (born 2001), Chinese footballer
