= Shi Jun =

Shi Jun may refer to:

- Shi Jun (footballer)
- Shi Jun (politician)
