= Liu Heng =

Liu Heng may refer to:

- Liu Heng (202 BC–157 BC), posthumously known as Emperor Wen of Han
- Liu Heng (born 1954), Chinese writer
- Liu Heng (born 1996), Chinese footballer
