= Liao Jiajun =

Chinese association football player

Personal information
- Date of birth: 24 December 2002 (age 23)
- Place of birth: Guangzhou, Guangdong, China
- Height: 1.74 m (5 ft 9 in)
- Position: Defender

Team information
- Current team: Meizhou Hakka
- Number: 22

Youth career
- –2021: Guangzhou City

Senior career*
| Years | Team | Apps | (Gls) |
| 2021–2022 | Guangzhou City | 22 | (0) |
| 2021 | → Sichuan Minzu (loan) | 9 | (0) |
| 2021 | → Qingdao Youth Island (loan) | 11 | (0) |
| 2023 | Yunnan Yukun | 4 | (0) |
| 2024–2025 | Guangxi Lanhang | 44 | (2) |
| 2025 | Qianxinan Xufengtang | 6 | (0) |
| 2026– | Meizhou Hakka | 7 | (0) |
- * Club domestic league appearances and goals as of 14:01, 31 May 2026 (UTC)

Liao Jiajun (Chinese: 廖家骏; born 24 December 2002) is a Chinese footballer currently playing as a defender for Meizhou Hakka.

== Club career ==
Liao Jiajun would play for the Guangzhou City youth team before being promoted to their senior team and then loaned out to third tier club Sichuan Minzu where he made his debut on 15 May 2021 in a league game against Qingdao Youth Island in a 2–2 draw. In the 2021 league season he would be loaned out again to another third tier club in Qingdao Youth Island where he quickly established himself as a regular and helped aid them win promotion at the end of the season. The following campaign he would return to his parent club and go on to make his debut for them on 8 June 2022 in a 2–0 defeat to Dalian Pro that was overturned to a 3–0 victory after the opposition fielded an ineligible player.

On 6 March 2026, Liao signed with China League One club Meizhou Hakka.

== Career statistics ==
As of 31 May 2026.

| Club | Season | League | | | Cup | | Continental | | Other | | Total | |
| Club | Season | Division | Apps | Goals | Apps | Goals | Apps | Goals | Apps | Goals | Apps | Goals |
|---|---|---|---|---|---|---|---|---|---|---|---|---|
| Guangzhou City | 2021 | Chinese Super League | 0 | 0 | 0 | 0 | – | | – | | 0 | 0 |
| Guangzhou City | 2022 | Chinese Super League | 22 | 0 | 0 | 0 | – | | – | | 22 | 0 |
| Guangzhou City | Total | | 12 | 0 | 0 | 0 | 0 | 0 | 0 | 0 | 12 | 0 |
| Sichuan Minzu (loan) | 2021 | China League Two | 9 | 0 | 0 | 0 | – | | – | | 9 | 0 |
| Qingdao Youth Island (loan) | 2021 | China League Two | 9 | 0 | 1 | 0 | – | | 2 (Note: Appearance(s) in Promotion/Relegation Play-offs) | 0 | 10 | 0 |
| Yunnan Yukun | 2023 | China League Two | 4 | 0 | 1 | 0 | – | | – | | 5 | 0 |
| Guangxi Lanhang | 2024 | China League Two | 26 | 1 | 1 | 0 | – | | – | | 27 | 1 |
| Guangxi Lanhang | 2025 | China League Two | 18 | 1 | 1 | 0 | – | | – | | 19 | 1 |
| Guangxi Lanhang | Total | | 44 | 2 | 2 | 0 | 0 | 0 | 0 | 0 | 46 | 2 |
| Qianxinan Xufengtang | 2025 | Chinese Champions League | 6 | 0 | – | | – | | – | | 6 | 0 |
| Meizhou Hakka | 2026 | China League One | 7 | 0 | 1 | 0 | – | | – | | 8 | 0 |
| Career total | | | 101 | 2 | 5 | 0 | 0 | 0 | 2 | 0 | 108 | 2 |
