= Jiang Yinghao =

Chinese association football player

Personal information
- Date of birth: 27 June 1993 (age 33)
- Place of birth: Qingdao, Shandong, China
- Height: 1.91 m (6 ft 3 in)
- Position: Defender

Youth career
- Jianping High School
- Roma
- –2014: Guizhou Renhe

Senior career*
Years	Team	Apps	(Gls)
2015	HVV Den Haag		
2015–2016	Trenčín	0	(0)
2016–2018	Liaoning FC		
2018	Torpedo Kutaisi		
2019–2020	Qingdao Red Lions	13	(1)
2021	Shanghai Jiading Huilong	5	(0)
2021	Xiamen Egret Island	8	(0)
- * Club domestic league appearances and goals as of 8 February 2022

Jiang Yinghao (Chinese: 蒋英浩; born 27 June 1993), formerly known as Jiang Dongnan (Chinese: 蒋东南), is a Chinese former footballer who played as a defender.

== Club career ==
In 2011, Jiang (under the name Jiang Dongnan) went on trial with Italian club Roma. It was announced by the club that he would sign a contract in the summer of that year.

In 2016, Jiang was suspended for 6 months for fraudulent identity and age documents.

== Career statistics ==
=== Club ===
As of 8 February 2022.

Club	Season	League			Cup		Other		Total	
Club	Season	Division	Apps	Goals	Apps	Goals	Apps	Goals	Apps	Goals
Trenčín	2015–2016	Fortuna liga	0	0	1 (Note: Appearances in the Slovak Cup)	0	0	0	1	0
Qingdao Red Lions	2019	China League Two	10	1	0	0	1 (Note: Appearances in the China League Two playoffs)	0	11	1
Qingdao Red Lions	2020	China League Two	3	0	0	0	0	0	3	0
Qingdao Red Lions	Total		13	1	0	0	1	0	14	1
Shanghai Jiading Huilong	2021	China League Two	5	0	0	0	0	0	5	0
Xiamen Egret Island	2021	China League Two	8	0	0	0	0	0	8	0
Xiamen Egret Island	2022	China League Two	0	0	0	0	0	0	0	0
Xiamen Egret Island	Total		8	0	0	0	0	0	8	0
Career total			26	1	1	0	1	0	28	1
