= Chen Keqiang =

Chinese footballer

Personal information
- Date of birth: 18 September 1999 (age 27)
- Place of birth: Zhengzhou, Henan, China
- Height: 1.83 m (6 ft 0 in)
- Positions: Attacking midfielder; left winger

Team information
- Current team: Yanbian Longding (on loan from Henan FC)
- Number: 11

Youth career
- Atlético Madrid
- –2020: Henan Jianye

Senior career*
Years	Team	Apps	(Gls)
2020–	Henan FC	38	(4)
2026–	→ Yanbian Longding (loan)	0	(0)
- * Club domestic league appearances and goals as of 28 August 2025

Chen Keqiang (simplified Chinese: 陈克强; traditional Chinese: 陳克強; pinyin: Chén Kèqiáng; born 18 September 1999) is a Chinese footballer currently playing as an attacking midfielder or left winger for Yanbian Longding, on loan from Henan FC.

== Club career ==
Chen Keqiang was promoted to the senior team of Henan Jianye (now known as Henan) within the 2020 Chinese Super League season and would make his debut in league game on 27 September 2020 against Shanghai Shenhua in a 2-0 defeat where he came on as a substitute for Fernando Karanga. He would go on to establish himself as a regular squad player within the team and go on to score his first goal for the club on 29 October 2022 in a league game against Shenzhen FC that ended in a 2-0 victory.

On 21 July 2026, Chen was loaned to China League One side Yanbian Longding for the rest of 2026 season.

== Career statistics ==
As of match played 31 December 2025.

Appearances and goals by club, season and competition
Club	Season	League			Cup		Continental		Other		Total	
Club	Season	Division	Apps	Goals	Apps	Goals	Apps	Goals	Apps	Goals	Apps	Goals
Henan Jianye/ Henan Songshan Longmen/ Henan FC	2020	Chinese Super League	4	0	1	0	–		–		5	0
Henan Jianye/ Henan Songshan Longmen/ Henan FC	2021	Chinese Super League	4	0	2	0	–		–		6	0
Henan Jianye/ Henan Songshan Longmen/ Henan FC	2022	Chinese Super League	15	3	1	0	–		–		16	3
Henan Jianye/ Henan Songshan Longmen/ Henan FC	2023	Chinese Super League	9	0	2	0	–		–		11	0
Henan Jianye/ Henan Songshan Longmen/ Henan FC	2024	Chinese Super League	4	1	1	0	–		–		5	1
Henan Jianye/ Henan Songshan Longmen/ Henan FC	2025	Chinese Super League	2	0	1	0	–		–		3	0
Henan Jianye/ Henan Songshan Longmen/ Henan FC	Total		38	4	8	0	0	0	0	0	46	3
Career total			38	4	8	0	0	0	0	0	46	3
