= Yin Changji =

Chinese footballer

Yin Changji 윤창길 尹昌吉
Personal information
- Date of birth: 17 March 1995 (age 31)
- Place of birth: Yanbian, Jilin, China
- Height: 1.75 m (5 ft 9 in)
- Position: Midfielder

Team information
- Current team: Yanbian Longding
- Number: 7

Youth career
- Yanbian FC

Senior career*
Years	Team	Apps	(Gls)
2015–2018	Yanbian Funde	16	(0)
2019–2020	Yanbian Beiguo	6	(0)
2021	Shanghai Jiading Huilong	2	(0)
2021–	Yanbian Longding	11	(0)
- * Club domestic league appearances and goals as of 31 December 2021

Yin Changji
- Simplified Chinese: 尹昌吉
Transcriptions
Standard Mandarin
- Hanyu Pinyin: Yǐn Chāngjí
- IPA: [ìn.ʈʂʰáŋ.tɕǐ]

Chinese Korean name
- Chosŏn'gŭl: 윤창길
Transcriptions
- Revised Romanization: Yun Changgil
- McCune–Reischauer: Yun Ch'anggil

Yin Changji (Chinese: 尹昌吉; Korean: 윤창길; born 17 March 1995) is a Chinese footballer.

== Club career ==
Yin Changji was promoted to the Yanbian's first team squad in the summer of 2015. On 1 April 2017, Yin made his senior debut in a 1–0 home defeat against Guangzhou R&F as the benefit of the new rule of the Super League that at least one Under-23 player must in the starting. He was substituted off in the 27th minute. He started in another three league matches against Tianjin Quanjian, Hebei China Fortune and Tianjin Teda in April, and was substituted off in the 14th, 9th and 9th minute, respectively. Yin was degraded to Yanbian's reserve squad in June 2017.

On 2 March 2019, Yin transferred to China League Two side Yanbian Beiguo. On February 4, 2020, Yanbian Beiguo was disqualified for 2020 China League Two due to its failure to hand in the salary and bonus confirmation form before the deadline.

== Career statistics ==
As of 31 December 2021

Club performance			League		Cup		League Cup		Continental		Total	
Club	Season	League	Apps	Goals	Apps	Goals	Apps	Goals	Apps	Goals	Apps	Goals
Yanbian Funde	2015	China League One	0	0	0	0	-		-		0	0
Yanbian Funde	2016	Chinese Super League	0	0	1	0	-		-		1	0
Yanbian Funde	2017	Chinese Super League	5	0	1	0	-		-		6	0
Yanbian Funde	2018	China League One	11	0	0	0	-		-		11	0
Yanbian Funde	Total		16	0	2	0	0	0	0	0	18	0
Yanbian Beiguo	2019	China League Two	6	0	1	0	-		-		7	0
Shanghai Jiading Huilong	2021	China League Two	2	0	0	0	-		-		2	0
Yanbian Longding	2021	China League Two	11	0	0	0	-		-		11	0
Career Total			35	0	3	0	0	0	0	0	38	0
