= Liu Jing (footballer, born 1997) =

Chinese association football player

Liu Jing 刘径
Personal information
- Date of birth: 17 January 1997 (age 29)
- Place of birth: Hangzhou, Zhejiang
- Height: 1.75 m (5 ft 9 in)
- Position: Defender

Team information
- Current team: Wenzhou FC
- Number: 21

Youth career
- –2017: Zhejiang Greentown
- 2018–2019: Hebei China Fortune

Senior career*
Years	Team	Apps	(Gls)
2019–2022	Hebei FC	46	(0)
2021	Sichuan Jiuniu (loan)	19	(0)
2023	Yunnan Yukun	11	(0)
2024	Hunan Billows	26	(0)
2025-	Wenzhou FC	27	(1)

International career
2012	China U16	1	(0)
- * Club domestic league appearances and goals as of 14:01, 31 December 2020 (UTC)

Liu Jing (simplified Chinese: 刘径; traditional Chinese: 劉徑; pinyin: Liú Jìng; born 17 January 1997) is a Chinese footballer currently playing as a defender for Wenzhou FC.

== Club career ==
Liu Jing was promoted to the senior team of Hebei China Fortune within the 2019 Chinese Super League season and would make his debut in a league game on 2 August 2019 against Beijing Guoan in a 2-0 defeat.

== Career statistics ==
As of 31 December 2020.

Club	Season	League			Cup		Continental		Other		Total	
Club	Season	Division	Apps	Goals	Apps	Goals	Apps	Goals	Apps	Goals	Apps	Goals
Hebei China Fortune	2019	Chinese Super League	8	0	0	0	–		-		8	0
Hebei China Fortune	2020	Chinese Super League	11	0	0	0	–		-		11	0
Hebei China Fortune	Total		19	0	0	0	0	0	0	0	19	0
Career total			19	0	0	0	0	0	0	0	19	0
