= Jin Chengjun =

Chinese footballer

Jin Chengjun 김성준 金成俊
Personal information
- Date of birth: 17 January 1997 (age 29)
- Place of birth: Yanbian, Jilin, China
- Height: 1.82 m (6 ft 0 in)
- Position: Forward

Team information
- Current team: Yanbian Longding

Youth career
- Yanbian FC
- 2015–2016: Qingdao Huanghai

Senior career*
Years	Team	Apps	(Gls)
2017–2018	Yanbian Funde	11	(0)
2019	Yanbian Beiguo	27	(2)
2020	Beijing Renhe	0	(0)
2021	Chengdu Rongcheng	0	(0)
2021	→ Yanbian Longding (loan)	4	(1)
2022-	Yanbian Longding	15	(1)
- * Club domestic league appearances and goals as of 8 January 2023

Jin Chengjun
- Simplified Chinese: 金成俊
Transcriptions
Standard Mandarin
- Hanyu Pinyin: Jīn Chéngjùn
- IPA: [tɕín.ʈʂʰə̌ŋ.tɕŷn]

Chinese Korean name
- Chosŏn'gŭl: 김성준
Transcriptions
- Revised Romanization: Gim Seongjun
- McCune–Reischauer: Kim Sŏngjun

Jin Chengjun (Chinese: 金成俊; Korean: 김성준; born 17 January 1997) is a Chinese footballer who currently plays for China League Two side Yanbian Longding.

== Club career ==
Jin Chengjun transferred back to Chinese Super League side Yanbian Funde on 19 January 2017 after two-year spell at Qingdao Huanghai youth team. He was promoted to the Yanbian's first team squad in the 2017 season. On 5 March 2017, Jin made his senior debut in a 0–0 away draw against Chongqing Lifan as the benefit of the new rule of the Super League that at least one Under-23 player must in the starting. He was substituted off in the 27th minute.

On 1 March 2019, Jin transferred to China League Two side Yanbian Beiguo. He would attract the attention of second tier club Beijing Renhe, however he would not make any senior appearances and joined another second tier club in Chengdu Rongcheng on 11 April 2021. He would go on to be loaned out to third tier club Yanbian Longding on 26 July 2021, before making his move permanent the following season.

== Career statistics ==
As of 8 January 2023.

Appearances and goals by club, season and competition
Club	Season	League			National Cup		Continental		Other		Total	
Club	Season	Division	Apps	Goals	Apps	Goals	Apps	Goals	Apps	Goals	Apps	Goals
Yanbian Funde	2017	Chinese Super League	5	0	0	0	-		-		5	0
Yanbian Funde	2018	China League One	6	0	1	0	-		-		7	0
Yanbian Funde	Total		11	0	1	0	0	0	0	0	12	0
Yanbian Beiguo	2019	China League Two	26	2	1	0	-		-		27	2
Beijing Renhe	2020	China League One	0	0	0	0	-		-		0	0
Chengdu Rongcheng	2021	China League One	0	0	0	0	-		-		0	0
Yanbian Longding (loan)	2021	China League Two	4	1	0	0	-		-		4	1
Yanbian Longding	2022	China League Two	15	1	1	0	-		-		16	1
Career total			56	4	3	0	0	0	0	0	59	4
