= Fu Yuncheng =

Chinese footballer

Personal information
- Date of birth: 22 December 1998 (age 27)
- Place of birth: Dalian, Liaoning, China
- Height: 1.87 m (6 ft 2 in)
- Position: Defender

Team information
- Current team: Dalian Kewei
- Number: 5

Youth career
- –2019: Dalian Pro
- 2019: Guangzhou R&F

Senior career*
Years	Team	Apps	(Gls)
2018–2019	Dalian Pro	0	(0)
2018	→ Dalian Chanjoy (loan)	8	(0)
2020–2022	Guangzhou City	21	(0)
2021	→ Sichuan Minzu (loan)	9	(0)
2023	Qingdao Hainiu	1	(0)
2024	Dalian Yingbo	0	(0)
2025	Nanjing City	17	(0)
2026–	Dalian Kewei	0	(0)
- * Club domestic league appearances and goals as of 17:38, 19 March 2026 (UTC)

Fu Yuncheng (Chinese: 傅韵程; born 22 December 1998) is a Chinese footballer who plays as a defender for China League Two club Dalian Kewei.

== Club career ==
Fu played in the Dalian Pro youth system before being sent on loan to third-tier club Dalian Chanjoy on 10 March 2018. He made his senior debut in the 2018 Chinese FA Cup third round game against Zhejiang Yiteng on 10 April. He returned to Dalian the following season but was unable to break into the first team and was allowed to join Guangzhou R&F (now known as Guangzhou City) on 10 February 2020.

Fu made his debut for Guangzhou R&F on 18 September 2020 in a Chinese FA Cup game against Shanghai Shenhua that ended in a 1–1 draw. This was followed by his league debut on 27 September against Shandong Luneng Taishan in a 0–0 draw. To gain more playing time, he was loaned out to third-tier club Sichuan Minzu for the 2021 China League Two season on 5 July 2021.

== Career statistics ==
As of 31 December 2022.

Club	Season	League			Cup		Continental		Other		Total	
Club	Season	Division	Apps	Goals	Apps	Goals	Apps	Goals	Apps	Goals	Apps	Goals
Dalian Pro	2018	Chinese Super League	0	0	0	0	–		–		0	0
Dalian Pro	2019	Chinese Super League	0	0	0	0	–		–		0	0
Dalian Pro	Total		0	0	0	0	0	0	0	0	0	0
Dalian Chanjoy (loan)	2018	China League Two	8	0	2	0	–		–		10	0
Guangzhou R&F/ Guangzhou City	2020	Chinese Super League	1	0	1	0	–		–		2	0
Guangzhou R&F/ Guangzhou City	2021	Chinese Super League	0	0	0	0	–		–		0	0
Guangzhou R&F/ Guangzhou City	2022	Chinese Super League	20	0	2	0	–		–		22	0
Guangzhou R&F/ Guangzhou City	Total		21	0	3	0	0	0	0	0	24	0
Sichuan Minzu (loan)	2021	China League Two	9	0	3	0	–		–		12	0
Career total			38	0	8	0	0	0	0	0	46	0
