= Sun Xipeng =

Chinese association football player

Personal information
- Date of birth: 1 July 1999 (age 27)
- Place of birth: Zibo, Shandong, China
- Height: 1.90 m (6 ft 3 in)
- Position: Forward

Team information
- Current team: Changchun Yatai
- Number: 38

Youth career
- –2019: Shanghai Shenhua

Senior career*
Years	Team	Apps	(Gls)
2019–2021	Shanghai Shenhua	0	(0)
2019	→ Shanghai Shenxin (loan)	22	(4)
2020	→ Qingdao Jonoon (loan)	7	(1)
2021	→ Qingdao Youth Island (loan)	10	(0)
2022	Chongqing Liangjiang Athletic	0	(0)
2022	Zibo Qisheng	10	(3)
2022–2023	Qingdao Hainiu	5	(1)
2023	→ Qingdao Red Lions (loan)	10	(1)
2024	Chongqing Tonglianglong	28	(1)
2025	Qingdao Red Lions	26	(1)
2026	Yanbian Longding	8	(0)
2026–	Changchun Yatai	17	(1)

International career^{‡}
2019	China U20	1	(0)
- * Club domestic league appearances and goals as of 15:00, 1 November 2025 (UTC) ‡ National team caps and goals as of 14:01, 28 July 2021 (UTC)

Sun Xipeng (Chinese: 孙锡鹏; born 1 July 1999) is a Chinese footballer currently playing as a forward for Changchun Yatai.

== Club career ==
Sun Xipeng would play for the Shanghai Shenhua youth team before being promoted to their senior team and then loaned out to second-tier club Shanghai Shenxin on 27 February 2019. He would go on to make his professional debut on 9 March 2019 in a league game against Changchun Yatai that ended in a 4–1 defeat. This would be followed by his first goal, which was in a league game on 6 April 2019 against Shijiazhuang Ever Bright in a 3–2 defeat. On his return he would be loaned out again to third-tier clubs Qingdao Jonoon. He would remain in Qingdao for another loan period with Qingdao Youth Island.

On 28 April 2022, Sun would transfer to top-tier club Chongqing Liangjiang Athletic. He would not get a chance to play for them after the club was dissolved on 24 May 2022 after the majority owner, Wuhan Dangdai Group could not restructure the clubs shareholdings and debt. Sun would be free to join third-tier club Zibo Qisheng on 13 June 2022. On 31 August 2022 he would join second-tier club Qingdao Hainiu. He would be part of the squad that gained promotion to the top tier at the end of the 2022 China League One campaign.

On 3 July 2026, Sun transferred to another China League One club Changchun Yatai.

== Career statistics ==
As of 1 November 2025.

Club	Season	League			Cup		Continental		Other		Total	
Club	Season	Division	Apps	Goals	Apps	Goals	Apps	Goals	Apps	Goals	Apps	Goals
Shanghai Shenxin (loan)	2019	China League One	22	4	0	0	–		–		22	4
Qingdao Jonoon (loan)	2020	China League Two	7	1	0	0	–		–		7	1
Qingdao Youth Island (loan)	2021	China League Two	9	0	2	0	–		1 (Note: Appearance(s) in CL2 Relegation play-offs)	0	12	0
Zibo Qisheng	2022	China League Two	10	3	–		–		–		10	3
Qingdao Hainiu	2022	China League One	0	0	0	0	–		–		0	0
Qingdao Hainiu	2023	Chinese Super League	5	0	2	0	–		–		7	0
Qingdao Hainiu	Total		5	0	2	0	0	0	0	0	7	0
Qingdao Red Lions (loan)	2023	China League Two	10	1	0	0	–		–		10	1
Chongqing Tonglianglong	2024	China League One	28	1	2	1	–		–		30	2
Qingdao Red Lions	2025	China League One	26	1	1	0	–		–		27	1
Career total			117	11	7	1	0	0	0	0	124	12
