= Shao Shuai (footballer, born 1997) =

Chinese association football player

Personal information
- Date of birth: 10 March 1997 (age 29)
- Place of birth: Baoding, Hebei, China
- Height: 1.86 m (6 ft 1 in)
- Position: Defender

Team information
- Current team: Ganzhou Ruishi (on loan from Jiangxi Dingnan United)
- Number: 28

Senior career*
Years	Team	Apps	(Gls)
2019–2020	Beijing Renhe	6	(0)
2020	Kunshan FC	0	(0)
2021	Heilongjiang Ice City	0	(0)
2021	→ Xiamen Egret Island (loan)	13	(0)
2022	Yanbian Longding	8	(0)
2023–	Jiangxi Dingnan United	40	(0)
2026–	→ Ganzhou Ruishi (loan)	0	(0)
- * Club domestic league appearances and goals as of 08:01, 5 May 2022 (UTC)

Shao Shuai (simplified Chinese: 邵帅; traditional Chinese: 邵帥; pinyin: Shào Shuài; born 10 March 1997) is a Chinese footballer currently playing as a defender in China League Two for Ganzhou Ruishi.

== Club career ==
Shao Shuai would be promoted to the Beijing Renhe senior team during the 2019 Chinese Super League season and would go on to make his debut in the Chinese FA Cup on 30 April 2019 against Liaoning FC in a 1-0 victory. On 20 April 2021, Shao would transfer to second tier football club Heilongjiang Ice City.

== Career statistics ==
As of 31 December 2023.

Club	Season	League			Cup		Continental		Other		Total	
Club	Season	Division	Apps	Goals	Apps	Goals	Apps	Goals	Apps	Goals	Apps	Goals
Beijing Renhe	2019	Chinese Super League	6	0	2	0	–		–		8	0
Heilongjiang Ice City	2021	China League One	0	0	–		–		–		0	0
Xiamen Egret Island (loan)	2021	China League Two	13	0	0	0	–		–		13	0
Yanbian Longding	2022	China League Two	8	0	0	0	–		–		8	0
Heilongjiang Ice City	2023	China League One	16	0	1	0	–		–		17	0
Career total			43	0	3	0	0	0	0	0	46	0
