= Tan Yang (footballer, born 1999) =

Chinese association football player

Personal information
- Date of birth: 28 February 1999 (age 27)
- Place of birth: Yubei, Chongqing, China
- Height: 1.76 m (5 ft 9 in)
- Position: Midfielder

Team information
- Current team: Shenzhen Peng City

Youth career
- 2015–2018: Shanghai Shenhua
- 2018: Vizela

Senior career*
Years	Team	Apps	(Gls)
2018–2019	Vizela	2	(0)
2019	→ Sichuan Jiuniu (loan)	6	(0)
2020–	Shenzhen Peng City	0	(0)
2021	→ Yanbian Longding (loan)	10	(1)

International career
2017	China U19		
- * Club domestic league appearances and goals as of 8 February 2022

Tan Yang (Chinese: 谭扬; born 28 February 1999) is a Chinese footballer currently playing as a midfielder for Shenzhen Peng City.

== Club career ==
Having moved to Portugal to join Vizela, Tan returned to China in 2019 to join Sichuan Jiuniu on loan. He would return to Sichuan Jiuniu on a permanent basis following his release from Vizela, before being loaned again; this time to Yanbian Longding.

== Career statistics ==
=== Club ===
As of 8 February 2022.

Club	Season	League			Cup		Other		Total	
Club	Season	Division	Apps	Goals	Apps	Goals	Apps	Goals	Apps	Goals
Vizela	2018–19	Campeonato de Portugal	2	0	0	0	0	0	2	0
Vizela	2019–20	Campeonato de Portugal	0	0	0	0	0	0	0	0
Vizela	Total		2	0	0	0	0	0	2	0
Sichuan Jiuniu (loan)	2019	China League Two	6	0	0	0	2 (Note: Appearances in the China League Two playoffs)	0	8	0
Sichuan Jiuniu	2020	China League One	0	0	0	0	0	0	0	0
Sichuan Jiuniu	2021	China League One	0	0	0	0	0	0	0	0
Sichuan Jiuniu	2022	China League One	0	0	0	0	0	0	0	0
Sichuan Jiuniu	Total		6	0	0	0	2	0	8	0
Yanbian Longding (loan)	2021	China League Two	10	1	1 (Note: Appearances in the Chinese FA Cup)	0	0	0	11	1
Career total			18	1	1	0	2	0	21	1
