= Wang Zhifeng =

Chinese footballer (born 1997)

Personal information
- Date of birth: 1 February 1997 (age 29)
- Place of birth: Wuhan, Hubei, China
- Height: 1.95 m (6 ft 5 in)
- Position: Goalkeeper

Team information
- Current team: Yunnan Yukun
- Number: 23

Youth career
- –2017: Wuhan Zall

Senior career*
Years	Team	Apps	(Gls)
2018–2022	Wuhan Yangtze River	39	(0)
2023–2025	Changchun Yatai	21	(0)
2026–	Yunnan Yukun	19	(0)
- * Club domestic league appearances and goals as of 19 November 2026

Wang Zhifeng (Chinese: 王智峰; born 1 February 1997) is a Chinese professional footballer who currently playing as a goalkeeper for Chinese Super League club Yunnan Yukun.

== Club career ==
Wang Zhifeng would make his senior debut for Wuhan Zall in a league game on 1 August 2020 against Beijing Guoan where he came on as a substitute for Dong Chunyu in a match that ended in a 1–0 defeat. After the game he would gradually establish himself as an integral member of the team. At the end of the 2022 Chinese Super League season, Wuhan were relegated. On 25 January 2023, the club announced that it had dissolved due to financial difficulties.

On 7 April 2023, Wang joined fellow Chinese Super League club Changchun Yatai on a free transfer.

On 5 January 2026, Wang joined Chinese Super League club Yunnan Yukun.

== Career statistics ==
As of 2 November 2024.

Club	Season	League			Cup		Continental		Other		Total	
Club	Season	Division	Apps	Goals	Apps	Goals	Apps	Goals	Apps	Goals	Apps	Goals
Wuhan Zall	2018	China League One	0	0	0	0	–		–		0	0
Wuhan Zall	2019	Chinese Super League	0	0	0	0	–		–		0	0
Wuhan Zall	2020	Chinese Super League	7	0	0	0	–		0 (Note: Appearance(s) in Promotion/Relegation Play-offs)	0	7	0
Wuhan Zall	2021	Chinese Super League	18	0	4	0	–		–		22	0
Wuhan Zall	2022	Chinese Super League	14	0	0	0	–		–		14	0
Wuhan Zall	Total		39	0	4	0	0	0	0	0	43	0
Changchun Yatai	2023	Chinese Super League	1	0	1	0	–		–		2	0
Changchun Yatai	2024	Chinese Super League	11	0	2	0	–		–		13	0
Changchun Yatai	Total		12	0	3	0	0	0	0	0	15	0
Career total			51	0	7	0	0	0	0	0	58	0
