= Zhou Bingxu =

Chinese association football player

Personal information
- Date of birth: 28 January 1995 (age 31)
- Place of birth: Dalian, Liaoning
- Height: 1.82 m (6 ft 0 in)
- Position: Forward

Team information
- Current team: Wuxi Wugou
- Number: 19

Senior career*
Years	Team	Apps	(Gls)
2018	Shaoxing Keqiao Yuejia	5	(0)
2019	Ningbo Yinbo		
2019–2020	Lhasa Urban Construction Investment	10	(2)
2020–2022	Meizhou Hakka	1	(0)
2021	Sichuan Minzu (Loan)	6	(0)
2022–	Wuxi Wugou	14	(7)
- * Club domestic league appearances and goals as of 14:01, 31 December 2022 (UTC)

Zhou Bingxu (Chinese: 周炳旭; born 28 January 1995) is a Chinese footballer currently playing as a forward for Wuxi Wugou.

== Club career ==
Zhou Bingxu would play for the Dalian Shide Youth Training team and participated in the Chinese University Football League before joining second tier football club Shaoxing Keqiao Yuejia. He would go on to make his debut in a league game on 18 March 2018 against Wuhan Zall in a 3-2 defeat. He would unfortunately be part of the team that was relegated to the third-tier after the club failed to apply for a League One license, despite finishing 12th in the 2018 China League One season.

He would join third tier club Lhasa Urban Construction Investment before joining second tier club Meizhou Hakka and would make his debut in a league game on 13 September 2020 against Liaoning Shenyang Urban in a 2-0 victory. Gaining very little playing he would be loaned out to Sichuan Minzu before joining Wuxi Wugou on 23 May 2022.

== Career statistics ==
As of 31 December 2022.

Club	Season	League			Cup		Continental		Other		Total	
Club	Season	Division	Apps	Goals	Apps	Goals	Apps	Goals	Apps	Goals	Apps	Goals
Shaoxing Keqiao Yuejia	2018	China League One	5	0	1	0	–		–		6	0
Lhasa Urban Construction Investment	2019	China League Two	10	2	0	0	–		1 (Note: Appearances in the China League Two playoffs)	2	11	4
Meizhou Hakka	2020	China League One	1	0	0	0	–		–		1	0
Meizhou Hakka	2021	China League One	0	0	0	0	–		–		0	0
Meizhou Hakka	Total		1	0	0	0	0	0	0	0	1	0
Sichuan Minzu (Loan)	2021	China League Two	6	0	1	0	–		–		7	0
Wuxi Wugou	2022	China League Two	14	7	–		–		–		14	7
Career total			36	9	2	0	0	0	1	2	39	11
