= Wang Xiaole =

Chinese footballer

Wang Xiaole 王小乐
Personal information
- Date of birth: 8 January 1997 (age 29)
- Place of birth: Wuhan, Hubei, China
- Height: 1.81 m (5 ft 11 1/2 in)
- Position: Midfielder

Team information
- Current team: Zhuhai Qin'ao

Youth career
- 2011–2017: Beijing Guoan

Senior career*
Years	Team	Apps	(Gls)
2018–2020	Beijing Guoan	2	(0)
2020	Qinghai Oulu International		
2021	Nanjing City	0	(0)
2021	→ Hebei Zhuoao (loan)	6	(0)
2022-	Zhuhai Qin'ao	0	(0)

International career^{‡}
2017	China U-20	1	(0)
- * Club domestic league appearances and goals as of 5 May 2022 ‡ National team caps and goals as of 8 May 2017

Wang Xiaole (Chinese: 王小乐; pinyin: Wáng Xiǎolè; born 8 January 1997) is a Chinese footballer who currently plays for China League Two side Zhuhai Qin'ao.

== Club career ==
Wang Xiaole joined Chinese Super League side Beijing Guoan's youth academy in September 2011. He was promoted to the first team squad by Roger Schmidt in 2018. On 29 April 2018, he made his senior debut in a 4–3 home win against Guizhou Hengfeng, coming on as a substitute for Jonathan Viera in the 89th minute.

== Career statistics ==
As of 31 December 2020

Appearances and goals by club, season and competition
Club	Season	League			National Cup		Continental		Other		Total	
Club	Season	Division	Apps	Goals	Apps	Goals	Apps	Goals	Apps	Goals	Apps	Goals
Beijing Guoan	2018	Chinese Super League	3	0	0	0	-		-		3	0
Career total			3	0	0	0	0	0	0	0	3	0

== Honours ==
=== Club ===
Beijing Guoan

- Chinese FA Cup: 2018
