= Jiang Hao =

Chinese footballer

Jiang Hao 姜灏
Personal information
- Date of birth: December 28, 1988 (age 37)
- Place of birth: Dalian, Liaoning, China
- Height: 1.89 m (6 ft 2 1/2 in)
- Position: Goalkeeper

Team information
- Current team: Dalian Zhixing

Senior career*
Years	Team	Apps	(Gls)
2008–2012	Dalian Shide	0	(0)
2013–2018	Jiangsu Suning	0	(0)
2019–2021	Beijing BSU	39	(0)
2021	Nanjing City	0	(0)
2021-2022	Beijing BSU	23	(0)
2022–	Dalian Zhixing	0	(0)
- * Club domestic league appearances and goals as of 26 April 2022

Jiang Hao (Chinese: 姜灏; pinyin: Jiāng Hào; born 28 December 1988) is a Chinese football player who currently plays for Dalian Zhixing.

== Club career ==
Jiang started his professional career when he was promoted to Chinese Super League side Dalian Shide first team squad in 2008. Playing as back-up goalkeeper, he didn't make any appearance between 2008 and 2011. On 19 July 2012, he made his senior debut in the fourth round of 2012 Chinese FA Cup which Dalian Shide lost to Guizhou Renhe 2–0 at Guiyang Olympic Centre.

Jiang transferred to another Super League club Jiangsu Sainty in January 2013. He made his debut for Jiangsu on 9 May 2017 in the last group match of 2017 AFC Champions League, which he kept a clean sheet as Jiangsu Suning beat Adelaide United 1–0.

On 28 February 2019, Jiang transferred to China League One side Beijing BSU.

== Career statistics ==
Statistics accurate as of match played 31 December 2020.

Appearances and goals by club, season and competition
Club	Season	League			National Cup		Continental		Other		Total	
Club	Season	Division	Apps	Goals	Apps	Goals	Apps	Goals	Apps	Goals	Apps	Goals
Dalian Shide	2008	Chinese Super League	0	0	-		-		-		0	0
Dalian Shide	2009	Chinese Super League	0	0	-		-		-		0	0
Dalian Shide	2010	Chinese Super League	0	0	-		-		-		0	0
Dalian Shide	2011	Chinese Super League	0	0	0	0	-		-		0	0
Dalian Shide	2012	Chinese Super League	0	0	1	0	-		-		1	0
Dalian Shide	Total		0	0	1	0	0	0	0	0	1	0
Jiangsu Sainty	2013	Chinese Super League	0	0	0	0	0	0	-		0	0
Jiangsu Sainty	2014	Chinese Super League	0	0	0	0	-		-		0	0
Jiangsu Sainty	2015	Chinese Super League	0	0	0	0	-		-		0	0
Jiangsu Sainty	2016	Chinese Super League	0	0	0	0	0	0	-		0	0
Jiangsu Sainty	2017	Chinese Super League	0	0	0	0	1	0	-		1	0
Jiangsu Sainty	2018	Chinese Super League	0	0	0	0	-		-		0	0
Jiangsu Sainty	Total		0	0	0	0	1	0	0	0	1	0
Beijing BSU	2019	China League One	25	0	0	0	-		-		25	0
Beijing BSU	2020	China League One	14	0	-		-		-		14	0
Beijing BSU	Total		39	0	0	0	0	0	0	0	39	0
Career total			39	0	1	0	1	0	0	0	41	0

== Honours ==
=== Club ===
Jiangsu Sainty

- Chinese FA Cup: 2015
