= Ci Tian =

Chinese footballer (born 1996)

Personal information
- Date of birth: 12 October 1996 (age 30)
- Place of birth: Baoding, Hebei, China
- Height: 1.75 m (5 ft 9 in)
- Position: Forward

Team information
- Current team: Tianjin Dajili

Senior career*
Years	Team	Apps	(Gls)
2017–2018	Werder Bremen III	27	(6)
2018–2019	Cangzhou Mighty Lions	0	(0)
2021	Shaoxing Keqiao Yuejia	0	(0)
- * Club domestic league appearances and goals as of 28 April 2022

Ci Tian (Chinese: 慈天; born 12 October 1996) is a Chinese footballer who plays as a forward.

== Career ==
Before the second half of 2016–2017, Ci signed for the reserves of German Bundesliga side Werder Bremen. In 2018, he signed for Cangzhou Mighty Lions in the Chinese second division. In 2021, he signed for Chinese third division club Shaoxing Keqiao Yuejia. On 31 July 2021, Ci debuted for Shaoxing Keqiao Yuejia during a 1–1 draw with Hebei Kungfu.
