= Li Biao =

Chinese association football player

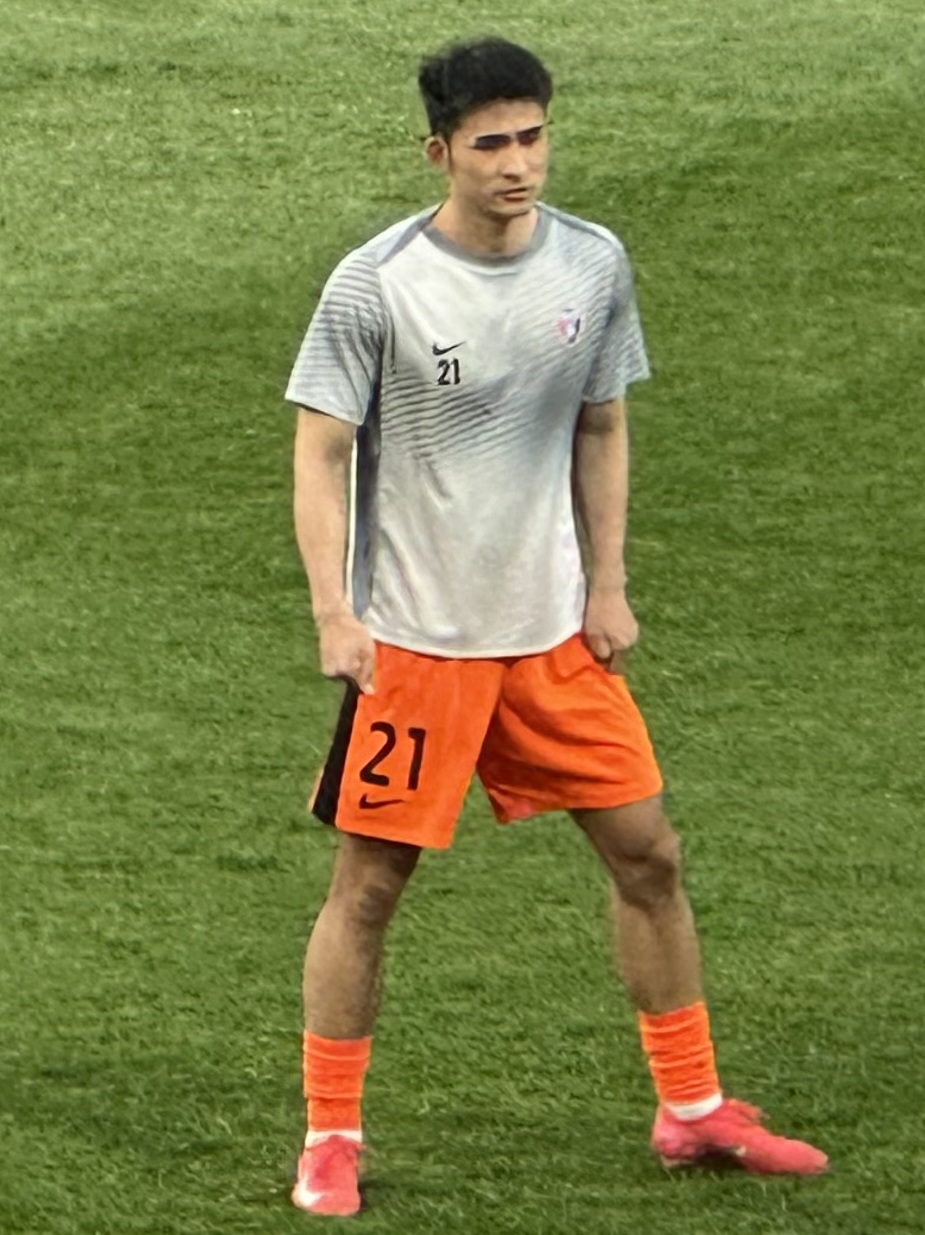
- Li Biao in May 2025

Personal information
- Date of birth: 12 December 1997 (age 28)
- Place of birth: Lijiang, Yunnan, China
- Height: 1.82 m (6 ft 0 in)
- Position: Midfielder

Team information
- Current team: Hubei Istar (on loan from Yunnan Yukun)
- Number: 21

Youth career
- –2016: Shaoxing Keqiao Yuejia

Senior career*
Years	Team	Apps	(Gls)
2016–2019	Gondomar	6	(0)
2016–2019	Gondomar B		
2019–2020	Maia Lidador	21	(1)
2020-2021	Gondomar B		
2021	Hubei Istar		
2021	→ Kunming Zheng He Shipman (loan)	20	(9)
2021	Kunming Zheng He		
2022	Hubei Istar	17	(5)
2023–	Yunnan Yukun	34	(4)
2026–	→ Hubei Istar (loan)	0	(0)
- * Club domestic league appearances and goals as of 26 August 2025

Li Biao (Chinese: 李彪; born 12 December 1997) is a Chinese footballer currently playing as a midfielder for Hubei Istar, on loan from Yunnan Yukun.

== Career statistics ==
=== Club ===
As of 26 August 2021.

Club	Season	League			Cup		Other		Total	
Club	Season	Division	Apps	Goals	Apps	Goals	Apps	Goals	Apps	Goals
Gondomar	2016–17	Campeonato de Portugal	5	0	1 (Note: Appearances in the Taça de Portugal)	0	0	0	6	0
Gondomar	2017–18	Campeonato de Portugal	0	0	0	0	0	0	0	0
Gondomar	2018–19	Campeonato de Portugal	0	0	0	0	0	0	0	0
Gondomar	2019–20	Campeonato de Portugal	0	0	0	0	0	0	0	0
Gondomar	2020–21	Campeonato de Portugal	1	0	0	0	0	0	1	0
Gondomar	Total		6	0	1	0	0	0	7	0
Gondomar B	2016–17	Porto Elite Pro-National Div 2	11	0	–		0	0	11	0
Gondomar B	2017–18	Porto Division of Honour	–		–		0	0	0	0
Gondomar B	2018–19	Porto Elite Pro-National Div 2	22	1	–		0	0	22	1
Gondomar B	2019–20	Porto Elite Pro-National Div 1	0	0	–		0	0	0	0
Gondomar B	2020–21	Porto Elite Pro-National Div 1	8	0	–		0	0	8	0
Gondomar B	Total		41	1	0	0	0	0	41	1
Maia Lidador (loan)	2019–20	Porto Elite Pro-National Div 1	21	1	0	0	0	0	21	1
Kunming Zheng He Shipman	2021	China League Two	13	5	2 (Note: Appearances in the Chinese FA Cup)	1	0	0	15	6
Career total			81	6	3	1	0	0	84	7
