= Zeng Qingshen =

Chinese footballer (born 1997)

Personal information
- Date of birth: 11 February 1997 (age 29)
- Place of birth: China
- Height: 1.77 m (5 ft 10 in)
- Position: Midfielder

Team information
- Current team: Hunan HBS Mangguoba

Senior career*
Years	Team	Apps	(Gls)
2018-2019	Vejle	0	(0)
2019-2020	Smederevo	0	(0)
2020-2021	Hunan Billows	16	(2)
2021	→ Hubei Istar (loan)	3	(0)
2022-	Hunan HBS Mangguoba	0	(0)
- * Club domestic league appearances and goals as of 19 May 2022

Zeng Qingshen (Chinese: 曾庆珅; born 11 February 1997) is a Chinese footballer who plays as a midfielder for Chinese club Hunan HBS Mangguoba.

== Career ==
In 2018, Zeng signed for Danish top flight side Vejle. In 2019, he signed for Smederevo in the Serbian second division. In 2020, he signed for Chinese third division club Hunan Billows. On 7 November 2020, Zeng scored his first goal for Hunan Billows during a 1-2 loss to Shaoxing Keqiao Yuejia.
