= Zheng Bofan =

Chinese association football player

Personal information
- Date of birth: 2 March 1995 (age 31)
- Height: 1.80 m (5 ft 11 in)
- Position: Midfielder

Youth career
- –2015: CCD Santa Eulália
- 2015–2016: Felgueiras

Senior career*
Years	Team	Apps	(Gls)
2016–2017	Oliveira do Hospital	1	(0)
2017–2019	Nesebar	13	(0)
2019	Shandong Taishan	0	(0)
2019–2022	Dalian Pro	0	(0)
2021	→ Kunshan FC (loan)	0	(0)
2021–2022	→ Beijing BSU (loan)	20	(0)

International career
- China U19
- * Club domestic league appearances and goals as of 14:01, 24 August 2021 (UTC)

Zheng Bofan (Chinese: 郑铂凡; born 2 March 1995), formerly known as Zheng Zixiang (Chinese: 郑梓翔), is a Chinese footballer who played as a midfielder.

== Career statistics ==
=== Club ===
As of 24 August 2021.

Club	Season	League			Cup		Other		Total	
Club	Season	Division	Apps	Goals	Apps	Goals	Apps	Goals	Apps	Goals
Oliveira do Hospital	2015–16	Campeonato de Portugal	1	0	0	0	0	0	1	0
Nesebar	2016–17	Vtora liga	1	0	0	0	0	0	1	0
Nesebar	2017–18	Vtora liga	12	0	1 (Note: Appearances in the Bulgarian Cup)	0	0	0	13	0
Nesebar	Total		13	0	1	0	0	0	14	0
Shandong Taishan	2019	Chinese Super League	0	0	0	0	0	0	0	0
Dalian Pro	2019	Chinese Super League	0	0	0	0	0	0	0	0
Dalian Pro	2020	Chinese Super League	0	0	0	0	0	0	0	0
Dalian Pro	2021	Chinese Super League	0	0	0	0	0	0	0	0
Dalian Pro	Total		0	0	0	0	0	0	0	0
Kunshan FC (loan)	2021	China League One	0	0	0	0	0	0	0	0
Beijing BSU (loan)	2021	China League One	3	0	1 (Note: Appearances in the Chinese FA Cup)	0	0	0	4	0
Career total			7	0	1	0	0	0	8	0
