= Li Weijie =

Chinese association football player

Personal information
- Date of birth: 31 March 2000 (age 26)
- Height: 1.89 m (6 ft 2 in)
- Position: Goalkeeper

Youth career
- –2019: Guangzhou

Senior career*
Years	Team	Apps	(Gls)
2019–	Guangzhou	0	(0)
2019	→ Shanghai Shenxin (loan)	3	(0)
2021	→ Shaanxi Warriors Beyond (loan)	3	(0)

International career
- China U17
2017	China U19	1	(0)
- * Club domestic league appearances and goals as of 00:01, 15 January 2022 (UTC)

Li Weijie (Chinese: 李伟杰; born 31 March 2000) is a Chinese footballer currently playing as a goalkeeper for Guangzhou.

== Career statistics ==
=== Club ===
As of 15 January 2022.

Club	Season	League			Cup		Other		Total	
Club	Season	Division	Apps	Goals	Apps	Goals	Apps	Goals	Apps	Goals
Guangzhou	2019	Chinese Super League	0	0	0	0	0	0	0	0
Guangzhou	2020	Chinese Super League	0	0	1 (Note: Appearances in the Chinese FA Cup)	0	0	0	1	0
Guangzhou	2021	Chinese Super League	0	0	0	0	0	0	0	0
Guangzhou	Total		0	0	1	0	0	0	1	0
Shanghai Shenxin (loan)	2019	China League One	3	0	0	0	0	0	3	0
Shaanxi Warriors Beyond (loan)	2021	China League Two	3	0	0	0	0	0	3	0
Career total			6	0	1	0	0	0	7	0
