= Tong Feige =

Chinese association football player

Personal information
- Date of birth: 23 July 2002 (age 24)
- Position: Defender

Team information
- Current team: Beijing BSU

Youth career
- 2018–2019: Banfield

Senior career*
Years	Team	Apps	(Gls)
2020	Hebei Zhuoao	2	(0)
2021–	Beijing BSU	2	(0)
2021	→ Quanzhou Yassin (loan)	9	(0)
- * Club domestic league appearances and goals as of 14:01, 29 April 2022 (UTC)

Tong Feige (Chinese: 童菲戈; born 23 July 2002) is a Chinese footballer currently playing as a defender for Beijing BSU.

== Club career ==
Tong was part of a nine-month training camp with Argentine side Banfield, from 2018 to 2019.

== Career statistics ==
=== Club ===
As of 29 April 2022.

Club	Season	League			Cup		Continental		Other		Total	
Club	Season	Division	Apps	Goals	Apps	Goals	Apps	Goals	Apps	Goals	Apps	Goals
Hebei Zhuoao	2020	China League Two	2	0	0	0	–		0	0	2	0
Beijing BSU	2021	China League One	2	0	0	0	–		0	0	2	0
Beijing BSU	2022	China League One	0	0	0	0	–		0	0	0	0
Beijing BSU	Total		2	0	0	0	0	0	0	0	2	0
Quanzhou Yassin (loan)	2021	China League Two	9	0	1 (Note: Appearances in the Chinese FA Cup)	0	–		0	0	10	0
Career total			13	0	1	0	0	0	0	0	14	0
