= Liu Yingchen =

Chinese footballer

Liu Yingchen 刘映辰
Personal information
- Date of birth: 15 January 1993 (age 33)
- Place of birth: Dalian, Liaoning, China
- Height: 1.84 m (6 ft 1/2 in)
- Positions: Left-back; left winger

Team information
- Current team: Dalian Jinshiwan

Youth career
- Dalian Shide
- 2013: Dalian Aerbin

Senior career*
Years	Team	Apps	(Gls)
2011–2012	Dalian Shide	0	(0)
2014–2015	Dalian Aerbin	2	(0)
2016	Dalian Transcendence	1	(0)
2017–2021	Dalian Yifang	1	(0)
2019	→ Shanghai Shenxin (loan)	17	(0)
2020	→ Beijing Renhe (loan)	5	(0)
2021	→ Xi'an Wolves (loan)	0	(0)
2021	→ Dandong Tengyue (loan)	1	(0)
2022-	Dalian Jinshiwan	0	(0)
- * Club domestic league appearances and goals as of 14 May 2022

Liu Yingchen (Chinese: 刘映辰; pinyin: Liú Yìngchén; born 15 January 1993) is a Chinese footballer who currently plays for Chinese club Dalian Jinshiwan.

== Club career ==
Liu Yingchen started his professional football career in 2011 when he was promoted to Chinese Super League side Dalian Shide's first team squad. He moved to Dalian Aerbin in 2013 after Dalian Shide dissolved and played for the reserve team due to transfer slot limit. Liu officially joined Dalian Aerbin in the 2014 season. On 11 April 2015, he made his senior debut in a 1–0 home win against Hunan Billows, coming on as a substitute for Bruno Meneghel in the stoppage time. He made another league appearance on 23 May 2015 in a 4–1 home win over Beijing BIT, also coming on Bruno Meneghel in the stoppage time.

On 5 February 2016, Liu transferred to Dalian Transcendence who newly promoted to China League One. On 13 April 2016, he made his debut in a 3–0 away defeat against Chengdu Qbao in the 2016 Chinese FA Cup. He made his league debut in the last match of season in a 0–0 away draw against Qingdao Jonoon, coming on for Hu Zhaojun in the 80th minute.

Liu returned to Dalian Yifang on a free transfer in February 2017. He played one league match in the 2017 season as Dalian Yifang won the title of the league and promoted back to the first tier. On 24 April 2018, he scored his first senior goal in a 4–1 away win over Liaoning in the 2018 Chinese FA Cup. On 2 May 2018, he played in another FA Cup match against Chongqing Dangdai Lifan with a 1–0 away win. In February 2019, Liu was loaned to League One side Shanghai Shenxin for the 2019 season.

== Career statistics ==
As of 31 December 2021.

Appearances and goals by club, season and competition
Club	Season	League			National Cup		Continental		Other		Total	
Club	Season	Division	Apps	Goals	Apps	Goals	Apps	Goals	Apps	Goals	Apps	Goals
Dalian Shide	2011	Chinese Super League	0	0	0	0	-		-		0	0
Dalian Shide	2012	Chinese Super League	0	0	0	0	-		-		0	0
Dalian Shide	Total		0	0	0	0	0	0	0	0	0	0
Dalian Aerbin	2014	Chinese Super League	0	0	0	0	-		-		0	0
Dalian Aerbin	2015	China League One	2	0	2	0	-		-		4	0
Dalian Aerbin	Total		2	0	2	0	0	0	0	0	4	0
Dalian Transcendence	2016	China League One	1	0	1	0	-		-		2	0
Dalian Yifang	2017	China League One	1	0	2	0	-		-		3	0
Dalian Yifang	2018	Chinese Super League	0	0	4	1	-		-		4	1
Dalian Yifang	Total		1	0	6	1	0	0	0	0	7	1
Shanghai Shenxin (Loan)	2019	China League One	17	0	1	0	-		-		18	0
Beijing Renhe (Loan)	2020	China League One	5	0	0	0	-		-		5	0
Xi'an Wolves (Loan)	2021	China League Two	0	0	0	0	-		-		0	0
Dandong Tengyue (Loan)	2021	China League Two	1	0	2	1	-		-		3	1
Career total			27	0	12	2	0	0	0	0	39	2

== Honours ==
=== Club ===
Dalian Yifang

- China League One: 2017
