= Cao Sheng =

Chinese footballer

Cao Sheng 曹盛
Personal information
- Full name: Cao Sheng
- Date of birth: 26 February 1995 (age 31)
- Place of birth: Wuhan, Hubei, China
- Height: 1.72 m (5 ft 7 1/2 in)
- Position: Midfielder

Youth career
- –2017: Shandong Luneng

Senior career*
Years	Team	Apps	(Gls)
2012	Shandong Youth	6	(1)
2014	→ Sintrense (loan)	0	(0)
2015	→ Real Massamá (loan)	4	(1)
2015–2016	→ União Torreense (loan)	6	(0)
2017–2023	Shandong Luneng	5	(0)
2020	→ Zibo Cuju (loan)	12	(1)
2021–2022	→ Qingdao Hainiu (loan)	29	(0)
2023	→ Taian Tiankuang (loan)	21	(3)
- * Club domestic league appearances and goals as of 24 December 2023

Cao Sheng (Chinese: 曹盛; pinyin: Cáo Shèng; born 26 February 1995) is a Chinese footballer who plays as a midfielder.

== Club career ==
Cao Sheng started his professional football career in 2012 when he was sent out to Shandong Youth for the 2012 China League Two. He went to Portugal for further training in January 2014, and played for Sintrense, Real Massamá and União Torreense between 2014 and 2016.

Cao was promoted to Shandong Luneng's first team squad by Felix Magath in June 2017. He made his debut for the club on 21 June 2017, playing the whole match in the 2017 Chinese FA Cup against Tianjin Teda, which Shandong won 1–0. On 9 July 2017, he made his Chinese Super League debut in a 2–0 away win against Tianjin Teda, coming on as a substitute for Jin Jingdao in the 89th minute.

Cao would struggle to gain much more playing time before being dropped to the reserves and then loaned out to third tier club Zibo Cuju on 14 October 2020. He would be loaned out once more to another third tier club in Qingdao Hainiu on 1 July 2021. He would go on to play a vital part as the club won the third tier title and promotion at the end of the 2021 China League Two season. His loan would be extended and he would go on to achieve successive promotions as he helped guide the club to second in the 2022 China League One season and promotion back into the top tier.

== Career statistics ==
As of 31 December 2022.

Appearances and goals by club, season and competition
Club	Season	League			National Cup		Continental		Other		Total	
Club	Season	Division	Apps	Goals	Apps	Goals	Apps	Goals	Apps	Goals	Apps	Goals
Shandong Youth	2012	China League Two	6	1	0	0	-		-		6	1
Sintrense (loan)	2014–15	Campeonato de Portugal	0	0	0	0	-		-		0	0
Real Massamá (loan)	2014–15	Lisbon FA Pró-National Division	4	1	2 (Note: Appearances in Taça da A.F.Lisboa)	1	-		-		6	2
União Torreense (loan)	2015–16	Campeonato de Portugal	6	0	0	0	-		-		6	0
Shandong Luneng Taishan	2017	Chinese Super League	5	0	2	0	-		-		7	0
Shandong Luneng Taishan	2018	Chinese Super League	0	0	1	0	-		-		1	0
Shandong Luneng Taishan	Total		5	0	3	0	0	0	0	0	8	0
Zibo Cuju (loan)	2020	China League Two	12	1	-		-		-		12	1
Qingdao Hainiu (loan)	2021	China League Two	19	0	1	0	-		-		20	0
Qingdao Hainiu (loan)	2022	China League One	10	0	2	1	-		-		12	1
Qingdao Hainiu (loan)	Total		29	0	3	1	0	0	0	0	32	1
Career total			62	3	8	2	0	0	0	0	70	5

== Honours ==
=== Club ===
Qingdao Hainiu

- China League Two: 2021
