= Zhang Enge =

Chinese association football player

Personal information
- Date of birth: 28 January 1997 (age 29)
- Height: 1.84 m (6 ft 0 in)
- Position: Defender

Team information
- Current team: Dandong Tengyue

Youth career
- –2020: Shanghai Port

Senior career*
Years	Team	Apps	(Gls)
2020–2021	Shanghai Port	0	(0)
2021	→ Dongguan United (loan)	9	(0)
2022-	Dandong Tengyue	0	(0)
- * Club domestic league appearances and goals as of 14:01, 27 April 2022 (UTC)

Zhang Enge (Chinese: 张恩格; born 28 January 1997) is a Chinese footballer currently playing as a defender for Dandong Tengyue.

== Club career ==
Zhang was loaned to China League Two side Dongguan United for the 2021 season.

== Career statistics ==
=== Club ===
As of 9 July 2021.

Club	Season	League			Cup		Continental		Other		Total	
Club	Season	Division	Apps	Goals	Apps	Goals	Apps	Goals	Apps	Goals	Apps	Goals
Shanghai Port	2020	Chinese Super League	0	0	1 (Note: Appearances in the Chinese FA Cup)	0	0	0	0	0	1	0
Shanghai Port	2021	Chinese Super League	0	0	0	0	1 (Note: Appearances in AFC Champions League qualification)	0	0	0	1	0
Shanghai Port	2022	Chinese Super League	0	0	0	0	0	0	0	0	0	0
Shanghai Port	Total		0	0	1	0	1	0	0	0	2	0
Dongguan United (loan)	2021	China League Two	9	0	0	0	–		0	0	9	0
Career total			9	0	1	0	1	0	0	0	11	0
