= Liu Guobao =

Chinese footballer (born 2003)

Liu Guobao 刘国宝
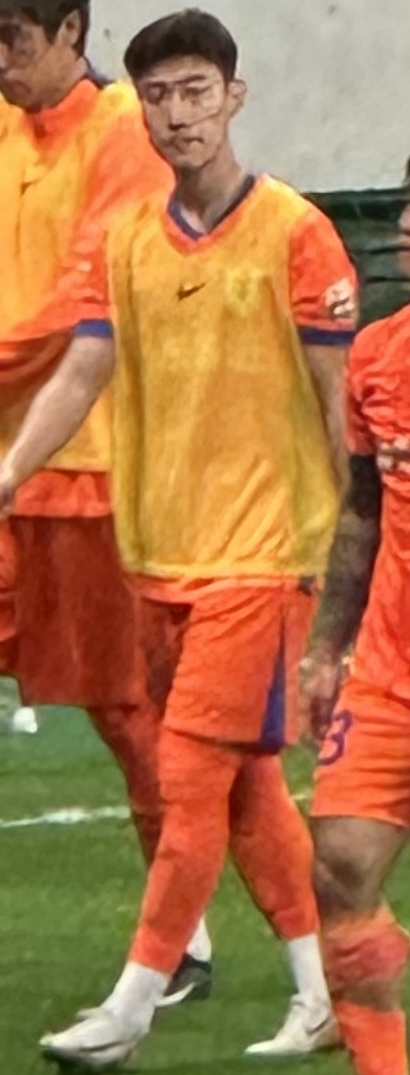
- Liu Guobao in April 2025

Personal information
- Date of birth: 30 April 2003 (age 23)
- Place of birth: Beijing, China
- Height: 1.83 m (6 ft 0 in)
- Position: Midfielder

Team information
- Current team: Qingdao Hainiu (on loan from Shandong Taishan)
- Number: 21

Youth career
- Shanghai Lucky Star
- 2016–2021: Shandong Taishan

Senior career*
Years	Team	Apps	(Gls)
2021–	Shandong Taishan	3	(0)
2021	→ Xi'an Wolves (loan)	10	(1)
2025	→ Changchun Yatai (loan)	4	(0)
2026–	→ Qingdao Hainiu (loan)	9	(0)
- * Club domestic league appearances and goals as of 22 November 2026

Liu Guobao (Chinese: 刘国宝; born 30 April 2003) is a Chinese professional footballer who plays as a midfielder for Chinese Super League side Qingdao Hainiu, on loan from Shandong Taishan.

== Career ==
A native to Beijing, along with his older brother Liu Guobo he would leave his hometown to pursue his football development, initially joining Shanghai Lucky Star before settling at the Shandong Taishan youth team. While his brother returned to Beijing to start his professional career, Liu Guobao reluctantly developed and graduated through the Shandong youth system at the start of the 2021 Chinese Super League season, he would on to be loaned on to third tier club Xi'an Wolves on 5 July 2021. In his return to Shandong, Liu would be included in a youth team squad to participate in the 2022 AFC Champions League as the senior team were unable to participate, due to the strict Chinese COVID-19 quarantine regulations.

On 21 July 2025, Liu was loaned out to Changchun Yatai.

After the 2025 season, Liu was loaned to Qingdao Hainiu on 28 February 2026.

== Career statistics ==
As of 31 January 2023

Appearances and goals by club, season and competition
Club	Season	League			National Cup		Continental		Other		Total	
Club	Season	Division	Apps	Goals	Apps	Goals	Apps	Goals	Apps	Goals	Apps	Goals
Shandong Taishan	2021	Chinese Super League	0	0	0	0	-		-		0	0
Shandong Taishan	2022	Chinese Super League	2	0	0	0	4	1	-		6	1
Shandong Taishan	Total		2	0	0	0	4	1	0	0	6	1
Xi'an Wolves (loan)	2021	China League Two	10	1	3	0	-		-		13	1
Career total			12	1	3	0	4	1	0	0	19	2
