= Ren Wei (footballer) =

Chinese association football player

Personal information
- Date of birth: 9 April 1997 (age 29)
- Place of birth: Chengdu, Sichuan, China
- Height: 1.84 m (6 ft 0 in)
- Position: Midfielder

Youth career
- –2015: Shanghai SIPG
- 2016–2018: Sichuan FA
- 2018–2019: Hebei China Fortune

Senior career*
Years	Team	Apps	(Gls)
2019–2022	Hebei FC	24	(0)
2021	→ Shanghai Jiading Huilong (loan)	13	(2)
2023	Dalian K'un City	0	(0)
2024	Taian Tiankuang	14	(0)
2024–2025	Dalian K'un City	10	(0)
2025	→ Jiangxi Dingnan United (loan)	1	(0)
2025	→ Guangxi Hengchen (loan)	7	(1)
- * Club domestic league appearances and goals as of 14:01, 31 December 2020 (UTC)

Ren Wei (Chinese: 任威; pinyin: Rén Wēi; born 9 April 1997) is a Chinese footballer currently playing as a midfielder.

== Club career ==
Ren Wei was promoted to the senior team of Hebei China Fortune within the 2019 Chinese Super League season and would make his debut in a league game on 1 December 2019 against Wuhan Zall in a 2-1 victory.

== Career statistics ==
As of 31 December 2020.

Club	Season	League			Cup		Continental		Other		Total	
Club	Season	Division	Apps	Goals	Apps	Goals	Apps	Goals	Apps	Goals	Apps	Goals
Hebei China Fortune	2019	Chinese Super League	1	0	0	0	–		-		1	0
Hebei China Fortune	2020	Chinese Super League	1	0	0	0	–		-		1	0
Hebei China Fortune	Total		2	0	0	0	0	0	0	0	2	0
Career total			2	0	0	0	0	0	0	0	2	0
