= Wang Weibo =

Chinese association football player

Personal information
- Date of birth: 30 October 1998 (age 28)
- Height: 1.92 m (6 ft 4 in)
- Position: Defender

Team information
- Current team: Beijing BSU
- Number: 44

Youth career
- –2018: Beijing Guoan

Senior career*
Years	Team	Apps	(Gls)
2019	Guangdong South China Tiger	12	(0)
2020–2021	Guizhou	0	(0)
2021–	Beijing BSU	2	(0)
- * Club domestic league appearances and goals as of 14:01, 24 August 2021 (UTC)

Wang Weibo (Chinese: 王巍博; born 30 October 1998) is a Chinese footballer currently playing as a defender for Beijing BSU.

== Career statistics ==
=== Club ===
As of 24 August 2021.

Club	Season	League			Cup		Other		Total	
Club	Season	Division	Apps	Goals	Apps	Goals	Apps	Goals	Apps	Goals
Guangdong South China Tiger	2019	China League One	12	0	1 (Note: Appearances in the Chinese FA Cup)	0	0	0	13	0
Guizhou	2020	China League One	0	0	0	0	0	0	0	0
Guizhou	2021	China League One	0	0	0	0	0	0	0	0
Guizhou	Total		0	0	0	0	0	0	0	0
Beijing BSU (loan)	2021	China League One	2	0	1	1	0	0	3	1
Career total			14	0	2	1	0	0	16	1
