= Sun Xuelong =

Chinese association football player

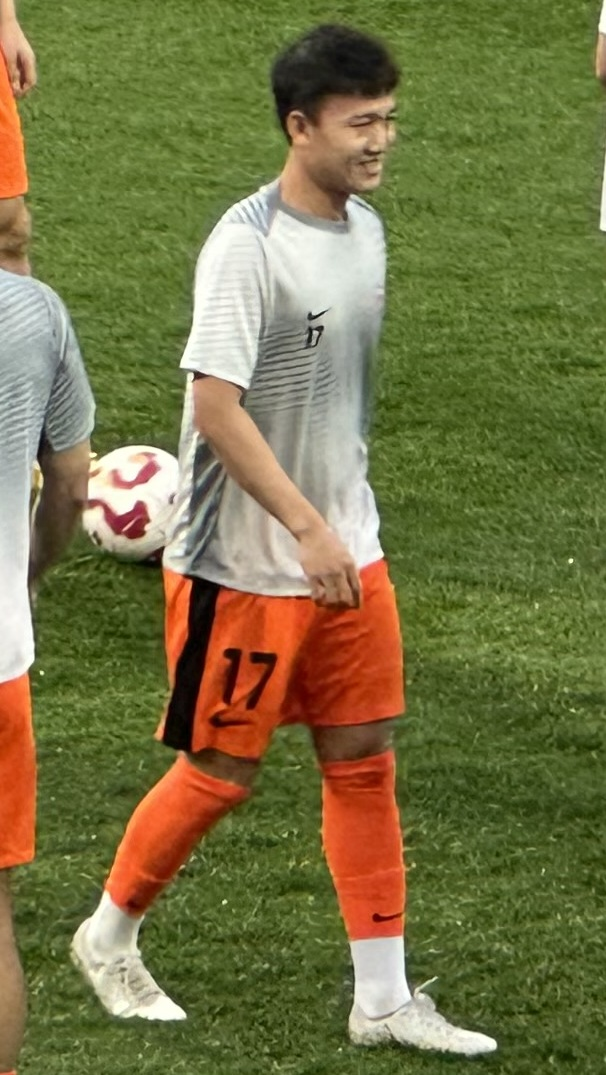
- Sun Xuelong in May 2025

Personal information
- Date of birth: 1 July 1999 (age 27)
- Place of birth: Xishuangbanna, Yunnan, China
- Height: 1.75 m (5 ft 9 in)
- Position: Midfielder

Team information
- Current team: Yunnan Yukun
- Number: 17

Youth career
- –2019: Tianjin Tianhai

Senior career*
Years	Team	Apps	(Gls)
2020	Shijiazhuang Ever Bright	1	(0)
2021	Chongqing Liangjiang Athletic	12	(0)
2022–2024	Tianjin Jinmen Tiger	14	(0)
2025–	Yunnan Yukun	13	(1)

International career^{‡}
2017	China U19	2	(0)
- * Club domestic league appearances and goals as of 19 November 2026 ‡ National team caps and goals as of 14:01, 22 September 2020 (UTC)

Sun Xuelong (Chinese: 孙学龙; born 1 July 1999) is a Chinese footballer currently playing as a midfielder for Yunnan Yukun.

== Club career ==
On 19 September 2020 he would make his debut for Shijiazhuang Ever Bright in a Chinese FA Cup game against Tianjin TEDA F.C. in a 2–0 defeat. On 30 July 2021, Sun transferred to another top-tier club in Chongqing Liangjiang Athletic. He made his debut in a league game against his former club on 30 July 2021 in a 1–1 draw where he came on as a substitute for Dong Honglin. Unfortunately the club was dissolved on 24 May 2022 due to financial difficulties.

On 2 June 2022, Sun would join fellow top-tier club Tianjin Jinmen Tiger for the start of the 2022 Chinese Super League season. He would make his debut in a league game on 9 June 2022 against Shenzhen F.C. in a 2–1 defeat.

== Career statistics ==
As of match played 31 December 2024.

Appearances and goals by club, season and competition
Club	Season	League			Cup		Continental		Other		Total	
Club	Season	Division	Apps	Goals	Apps	Goals	Apps	Goals	Apps	Goals	Apps	Goals
Shijiazhuang Ever Bright	2020	Chinese Super League	1	0	1	0	–		–		2	0
Chongqing Liangjiang Athletic	2021	Chinese Super League	12	0	2	0	–		–		14	0
Tianjin Jinmen Tiger	2022	Chinese Super League	9	0	0	0	–		–		9	0
Tianjin Jinmen Tiger	2023	Chinese Super League	3	0	2	0	–		–		5	0
Tianjin Jinmen Tiger	2024	Chinese Super League	2	0	2	0	–		–		4	0
Tianjin Jinmen Tiger	Total		14	0	4	0	0	0	0	0	18	0
Career total			27	0	7	0	0	0	0	0	34	0
