= Shi Jun (footballer) =

Chinese footballer

Shi Jun 石俊
Personal information
- Date of birth: 9 October 1982 (age 44)
- Place of birth: Dalian, Liaoning, China
- Height: 1.89 m (6 ft 2 in)
- Position: Striker

Senior career*
Years	Team	Apps	(Gls)
2002–2003	Yunnan Hongta	4	(0)
2004–2005	Chongqing Lifan	29	(5)
2005–2008	Young Boys	34	(3)
2008	→ Luzern (loan)	14	(1)
2008–2011	Chengdu Blades	35	(6)
2011	Sichuan Dujiangyan Symbol	12	(13)
2012	Harbin Yiteng	1	(0)
2012	→ Qinghai Senke (loan)	7	(2)
2013	Qinghai Senke	?	(3)
2016–2019	Hebei Elite	93	(45)
2020–2021	Yunnan Kunlu	12	(5)
2021	Shijiazhuang Gongfu	18	(6)
2022	Yunnan Yukun Steel		

International career
2005–2009	China PR	6	(0)

Managerial career
- 2021: Yunnan Kunlu (player-manager)
- 2022: Yunnan Yukun Steel (player-manager)
- 2023: Yunnan Yukun
- 2025–: Yunnan Yukun Reserve
- * Club domestic league appearances and goals as of 15 December 2023

Shi Jun (Chinese: 石俊; pinyin: Shí Jùn; born 9 October 1982) is a Chinese former professional footballer who played as a striker.

== Club career ==
=== Early career ===
At the age of five Shi was encouraged to start playing football by his father and was able to join Dalian Wanda's reserve team at an early age but was not able to hold down a place on the team. At the age of sixteen he would instead go on to join Changchun Yatai and start to playing as a forward. To begin his professional football career he would move to Yunnan Hongta in 2000 and then go on to make his debut in the Jia A in 2002. Injury saw his playing time limited throughout the 2003 league season, however in 2004 Hongta was bought out by Chongqing Lifan and Shi started to get more regular playing time within the first team where he quickly excelled as a forward.

=== Move to Switzerland ===
In July 2005, Shi had a successful trial with BSC Young Boys and after a visa delay he would eventually make a permanent move to the Swiss Super League outfit on July 21 and the transfer fee was believed to be around €500,000. He became the first Chinese footballer to play in the Swiss Super League and would make his debut on August 28, 2005, against FC St. Gallen after coming on as a substitute at the 85th minute. After three seasons Shi found it difficult to command a regular first team position and he was loaned out to another Swiss team FC Lucerne during the second half of the 2007/08 league season.

=== Return to China ===
Shi moved back to Chinese football with the newly promoted Chengdu Blades where he played in 15 games scoring 4 goals in his debut season. The following season saw Chengdu finish mid-table at the end of the league season, however they were relegated to the second tier for match-fixing. Shi remained with the team despite this to help them push for promotion. Shi transferred to China League Two side Sichuan Dujiangyan Symbol in July 2011. On 21 August, Shi scored 6 goals in a league match which Sichuan beat Hubei Youth 7–0. He scored 13 goals for just half of the 2011 league season which made him the top goal scorer of the league.

Shi moved to China League One side Harbin Yiteng in February 2012.

In March 2016, Shi signed for China League Two club Hebei Elite.

== Career statistics ==
Statistics accurate as of match played 31 December 2020.

Appearances and goals by club, season and competition
Club	Season	League			National Cup		Continental		Other		Total	
Club	Season	Division	Apps	Goals	Apps	Goals	Apps	Goals	Apps	Goals	Apps	Goals
Yunnan Hongta	2002	Chinese Jia-A League	4	0	0	0	-		-		4	0
Yunnan Hongta	2003	Chinese Jia-A League	0	0	0	0	-		-		0	0
Yunnan Hongta	Total		4	0	0	0	0	0	0	0	4	0
Chongqing Lifan	2004	Chinese Super League	19	4	0	0	-		-		19	4
Chongqing Lifan	2005	Chinese Super League	10	1	0	0	-		-		10	1
Chongqing Lifan	Total		29	5	0	0	0	0	0	0	29	5
Young Boys	2005–06	Swiss Super League	13	0	2	0	0	0	-		15	0
Young Boys	2006–07	Swiss Super League	17	3	4	1	0	0	-		21	4
Young Boys	2007–08	Swiss Super League	4	0	1	0	0	0	-		5	0
Young Boys	Total		34	3	7	1	0	0	0	0	41	4
Luzern (loan)	2007–08	Swiss Super League	14	1	0	0	-		-		14	1
Chengdu Blades	2008	Chinese Super League	16	5	-		-		-		16	5
Chengdu Blades	2009	Chinese Super League	12	1	-		-		-		12	1
Chengdu Blades	2010	China League One	3	0	-		-		-		3	0
Chengdu Blades	2011	Chinese Super League	4	0	0	0	-		-		4	0
Chengdu Blades	Total		35	6	0	0	0	0	0	0	35	6
Sichuan Dujiangyan Symbol	2011	China League Two	12	13	-		-		-		12	13
Harbin Yiteng	2012	China League One	1	0	0	0	-		-		1	0
Qinghai Senke (loan)	2012	China League Two	7	2	-		-		-		7	2
Qinghai Senke	2013	China League Two	?	3	2	2	-		-		2	5
Hebei Elite	2016	China League Two	19	7	0	0	-		-		19	7
Hebei Elite	2017	China League Two	22	9	1	0	-		-		23	9
Hebei Elite	2018	China League Two	25	13	0	0	-		-		25	13
Hebei Elite	2019	China League Two	27	16	3	2	-		-		30	18
Hebei Elite	Total		93	45	4	2	0	0	0	0	97	47
Yunnan Kunlu	2020	China League Two	10	5	-		-		-		10	5
Career total			239	83	13	5	0	0	0	0	252	88

== Honours ==
- China League Two top scorer: 2011
