= Liu Heng (footballer) =

Chinese footballer

Liu Heng 刘恒
Personal information
- Full name: Liu Heng
- Date of birth: 6 January 1996 (age 30)
- Place of birth: Yongcheng, Henan, China
- Height: 1.81 m (5 ft 11 1/2 in)
- Position: Defender

Team information
- Current team: Henan Jianye
- Number: 24

Youth career
- –2016: Hangzhou Greentown

Senior career*
Years	Team	Apps	(Gls)
2015	→ Baotou Nanjiao (loan)	11	(0)
2017–19	Henan Jianye	33	(0)
2021	Zibo Cuju	0	(0)
2022-	Dandong Tengyue	0	(0)
- * Club domestic league appearances and goals as of 16 September 2022

Liu Heng (simplified Chinese: 刘恒; traditional Chinese: 劉恒; pinyin: Liú Héng; born 6 January 1996) is a Chinese footballer who currently plays for Dandong Tengyue in China League Two.

== Club career ==
Liu Heng started his professional football career in 2015 when his was loaned to China League Two side Baotou Nanjiao from Hangzhou Greentown. In February 2017, Liu transferred to his home town club Henan Jianye in the Chinese Super League. He made his debut for Henan on 7 April 2017 in a 1–0 away defeat against Beijing Guoan.

== Career statistics ==
As of 31 December 2020.

Club	Season	League			National Cup		Continental		Other		Total	
Club	Season	Division	Apps	Goals	Apps	Goals	Apps	Goals	Apps	Goals	Apps	Goals
Baotou Nanjiao	2015	China League Two	11	0	2	0	-		-		13	0
Henan Jianye	2017	Chinese Super League	16	0	1	0	-		-		17	0
Henan Jianye	2018	Chinese Super League	10	0	1	0	-		-		11	0
Henan Jianye	2019	Chinese Super League	7	0	0	0	-		-		7	0
Henan Jianye	Total		33	0	2	0	0	0	0	0	35	0
Career total			44	0	4	0	0	0	0	0	48	0
