= Zhang Zhihao (footballer) =

Chinese association football player

Personal information
- Date of birth: 2 January 2001 (age 25)
- Place of birth: Zhoukou, Henan, China
- Height: 1.85 m (6 ft 1 in)
- Position: Defender

Team information
- Current team: Guangdong Mingtu
- Number: 28

Youth career
- Villarreal
- –2020: Guangzhou Evergrande

Senior career*
Years	Team	Apps	(Gls)
2020–2022	Guangzhou FC	0	(0)
2021	→ Beijing BSU (loan)	11	(0)
2022	→ Jiangxi Dark Horse Junior (loan)	9	(1)
2023	Jiangxi Dark Horse Junior	19	(0)
2024–2025	Henan FC	0	(0)
2025	→ Foshan Nanshi (loan)	11	(0)
2026–	Guangdong Mingtu	0	(0)
- * Club domestic league appearances and goals as of 11:42, 8 March 2026 (UTC)

Zhang Zhihao (Chinese: 张智豪; born 2 January 2001) is a Chinese footballer playing as a defender who plays for China League Two club Guangdong Mingtu.

== Career statistics ==
=== Club ===
As of 1 November 2022.

Club	Season	League			Cup		Continental		Other		Total	
Club	Season	Division	Apps	Goals	Apps	Goals	Apps	Goals	Apps	Goals	Apps	Goals
Guangzhou FC	2020	Chinese Super League	0	0	1 (Note: Appearances in the Chinese FA Cup)	0	0	0	0	0	1	0
Guangzhou FC	2021	Chinese Super League	0	0	0	0	5 (Note: Appearances in the AFC Champions League)	0	0	0	5	0
Guangzhou FC	2022	Chinese Super League	0	0	0	0	0	0	0	0	0	0
Guangzhou FC	Total		0	0	1	0	5	0	0	0	6	0
Beijing BSU (loan)	2021	China League One	11	0	0	0	–		0	0	11	0
Jiangxi Dark Horse Junior (loan)	2022	China League Two	9	1	0	0	–		0	0	9	1
Career total			20	1	1	0	5	0	0	0	26	1
