= Yunnan Yukun F.C. =

Association football club in China

Yunnan Yukun
- Full name: Yunnan Yukun Football Club 云南玉昆足球俱乐部
- Founded: 31 July 2021; 5 years ago
- Ground: Yuxi Plateau Sports Center Stadium
- Capacity: 30,300
- Owner(s): Yukun Steel Group Co., Ltd.
- Chairman: Guo Guangqi
- Head coach: Jordi Vinyals
- League: Chinese Super League
- 2026: Chinese Super League, 6th of 16
Home colours	Away colours

Yunnan Yukun Football Club (Chinese: 云南玉昆足球俱乐部; pinyin: Yúnnán Yùkūn Zúqiú Jùlèbù) is a Chinese professional football club based in Yuxi, Yunnan, that competes in the Chinese Super League, the top tier of Chinese football. Yunnan Yukun plays its home matches at the Yuxi Plateau Sports Center Stadium, located within Hongta District.

Founded in 2021 as Yunnan Yukun Steel Football Club, the club briefly changed their name to Yuxi Yukun Steel Football Club in 2022 before settling with their current name in 2023. The club gained three successive promotions, going from the fourth-tier of Chinese football to the top-flight between 2022 and 2024. With their promotion to the Chinese Super League in 2024, they became the first club from Yunnan to play in the CSL since its inception in 2004, and became the first club from Yunnan to play in the Chinese top-flight since Yunnan Hongta twenty-one years prior.

== History ==
Yunnan Yukun Steel logo used in 2021

Founded as Yunnan Yukun Steel Football Club on 31 July 2021 by Yuxi Education Investment Co., Ltd., the club entered the 2021 Chinese Champions League, with Zhu Jiong as the club's head coach. Yunnan Yukun Steel were eventually knocked out in the finals in a group that consisted of Jinan Xingzhou and Jiangsu Zhongnan Codion.

The club was reformed in 2022 as Yuxi Yukun Steel Football Club by organisations which included the Yunnan Yuxi Yukun Steel Group, in a bid to secure promotion to China League Two, the Chinese third-tier. Led by player-manager Shi Jun, Yukun progressed from their regional group in the 2022 Chinese Champions League to go into the final round. The club went on to become champions of the league on 20 November 2022 as they defeated Chongqing Tongliangloong over a penalty shoot-out after a two-legged tie, while confirming their spot in China League Two.

At the end of pre-season in 2023, Yuxi Yukun Steel appointed Niu Hongli as the club's new manager for the coming 2023 China League Two season. On 21 March 2023, the club changed its name to Yunnan Yukun Football Club. On 20 June 2023, following a 3–1 loss at Hainan Star, Niu Hongli resigned as manager, and Shi Jun would return to the club as his replacement. In the South Group, after 14 games, Yunnan Yukun were placed third, thus progressing to the promotion stage. Less than three months after his managerial appointment, Shi Jun resigned as manager on 5 September with eight points to a promotion place and only five league games remaining, and Li Jinyu was appointed as Yunnan Yukun manager on 7 September. Yunnan Yukun finished third place in the promotion stage, one place short for promotion to China League One. Following the dissolutions of Dalian Pro and Shenzhen, two clubs that have finished higher than them in the Chinese football pyramid, Yunnan Yukun were one club's withdrawal from the league away from gaining entry into China League One, so as to make up the numbers for the league. In January 2024, Dandong Tengyue player Li Xiaoting accused Yunnan Yukun on social media of "bribing Dandong to dissolve," in order for Yunnan Yukun to be promoted to China League One as a result. After reportedly undergoing investigation, Yunnan Yukun were allegedly confirmed to have not taken part in any transactions, but were admitted into China League One nonetheless, due to Dandong Tengyue's withdrawal from the league, independent of the influence from Yunnan Yukun.

The winter pre-season of 2024 saw Yunnan Yukun bring in former international footballers Zakaria Labyad from FC Utrecht, Nyasha Mushekwi from Zhejiang, and Alexandru Ioniță from Rapid București, as well as various domestic players with Chinese Super League playing experience to further strengthen their squad and prepare for the 2024 season. Yunnan Yukun received their first point in China League One on the first league game of the season on 9 March 2024, as they drew 0–0 away at Foshan Nanshi. With 17,872 fans in attendance, Yunnan Yukun secured their first win in China League One on 16 March as they defeated 10-men Nanjing City 2–1 on the club's home debut of the season. On 22 May 2024, Li Jinyu resigned as manager, and was eventually replaced by Norwegian Jørn Andersen, who had previously stepped down from his Hong Kong national team head coach position. After Andersen's arrival, he brought in Hong Kong defender Tsui Wang Kit from Lee Man. On 6 October 2024, with a 2–0 home win over Shanghai Jiading Huilong, Yunnan Yukun secured promotion to the Chinese Super League, the top-flight of Chinese football. They became the first club from Yunnan to play in the CSL, and the first club from Yunnan to compete in a Chinese top-flight since before the merger between Yunnan Hongta and Chongqing Lifan twenty-one years prior. Six days after on 12 October, Yunnan Yukun sealed the 2024 China League One title with three league matches left to play, with a 3–0 win against Suzhou Dongwu.

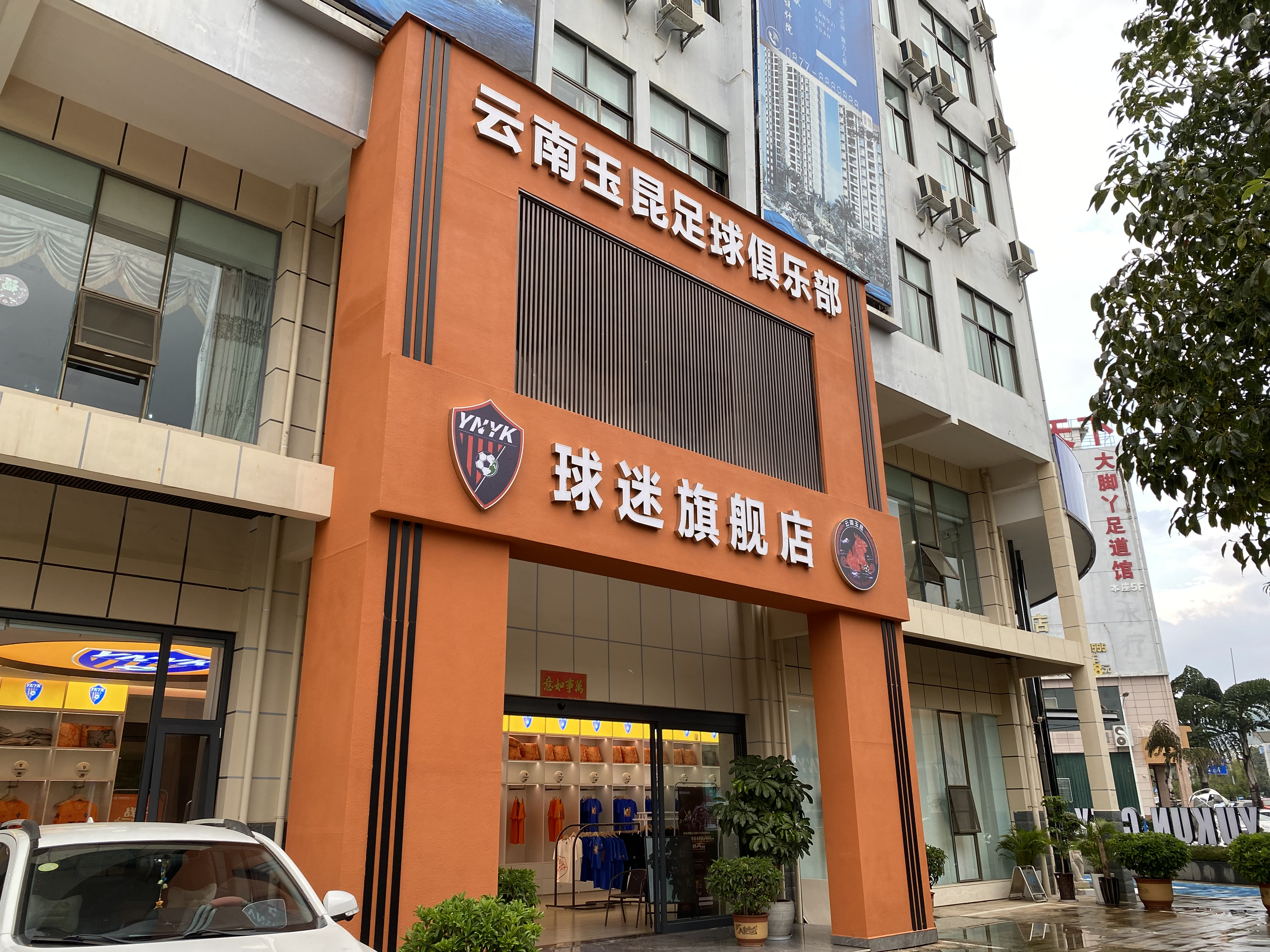
Yunnan Yukun's official merchandise store

== Players ==
=== First-team squad ===
As of July 2026

Note: Flags indicate national team as defined under FIFA eligibility rules; some limited exceptions apply. Players may hold more than one non-FIFA nationality.

No.	Pos.	Nation	Player
1	GK	CHN	Bao Yaxiong
2	DF	CHN	Hu Ruibao (on loan from Shenzhen Peng City)
3	DF	HKG	Tsui Wang Kit
5	DF	CHN	Shi Ke
6	MF	CHN	Zhao Yuhao (captain)
7	MF	CHN	Ye Chugui
8	MF	CHN	Xu Xin
9	FW	BRA	Cléber
10	MF	ROU	Alexandru Ioniță
11	FW	COD	Oscar Maritu
13	GK	CHN	Qiu Shengjun
14	GK	CHN	Wang Xinghao
16	DF	CHN	Zhang Xiangshuo
17	MF	CHN	Sun Xuelong
18	DF	CHN	Yi Teng

No.	Pos.	Nation	Player
19	FW	CHN	Huang Zichang
21	DF	CHN	Zhang Zihao
22	GK	CHN	Duan Liuyu
23	GK	CHN	Wang Zhifeng
24	GK	CHN	Yu Jianxian
25	DF	CHN	Deng Hanwen
26	DF	CHN	Zhang Chenliang
27	FW	CHN	Han Zilong
30	MF	NOR	John Hou Sæter
33	DF	ROU	Andrei Burcă
34	MF	BRA	Caio Vinícius
35	DF	CHN	Cui Qi
36	FW	CHN	Fei Ernanduo
39	MF	CHN	Bunyamin Abdusalam

=== Out on loan ===
Note: Flags indicate national team as defined under FIFA eligibility rules; some limited exceptions apply. Players may hold more than one non-FIFA nationality.

No.	Pos.	Nation	Player
—	DF	CHN	Duan Dezhi (at Yanbian Longding until 31 December 2026)
—	FW	CHN	Li Biao (at Hubei Istar until 31 December 2026)

No.	Pos.	Nation	Player
—	MF	CHN	Zhang Yufeng (at Shenzhen Peng City until 31 December 2026)
—	DF	CHN	Chen Yuhao (at Shenzhen Juniors until 31 December 2026)

== Notable players ==
The following players had international caps for their respective countries. Players in bold had international caps while playing for the club.

Africa

- (Angola) Hélder Costa
- (Morocco) Zakaria Labyad
- (Zimbabwe) Nyasha Mushekwi

Asia

- (China) Deng Hanwen
- (China) Huang Zichang
- (China) Shi Jun
- (China) Shi Ke
- (China) Tang Miao
- (China) Wang Jingbin
- (China) Xu Xin
- (China) Zhao Yuhao
- (Hong Kong) **Tsui Wang Kit**

Europe

- (Romania) **Andrei Burcă**
- (Romania) Alexandru Ioniță

== Coaching staff ==
Position	Name
Head coach	(Spain) Jordi Vinyals
Assistant coach	(Spain) Javier Almarza
Assistant coach	(China) Chang Wei
Assistant coach	(China) Yang Jianfei
Fitness coach	(Brazil) Guilherme Rondon
Goalkeeping coach	(Spain) Mikel Touzón

== Honours ==
League

- **China League One**
  - Champions: 2024
- **CMCL**
  - Champions: 2022
