= Xiamen Egret Island F.C. =

Chinese football club

Xiamen Egret Island 厦门鹭岛
- Full name: Xiamen Egret Island Football Club 厦门鹭岛足球俱乐部
- Founded: October 2019; 6 years ago
- Dissolved: April 2022; 3 years ago
- 2021: League Two, 5th of 24

Xiamen Egret Island Football Club (Chinese: 厦门鹭岛足球俱乐部) is a defunct Chinese football club that participated in the China League Two. The team was based in Xiamen, Fujian.

== History ==
Xiamen Qudian F.C. was founded in October 2019. The club participated in Chinese Champions League in 2020 and was promoted to China League Two. In 2021, the club changed its name to Xiamen Egret Island F.C.

The club was dissolved after 2021 season.

== Name history ==
- 2019–2020 Xiamen Qudian F.C. 厦门趣店
- 2021 Xiamen Egret Island F.C. 厦门鹭岛
