= Sichuan Minzu F.C. =

Chinese football club

Sichuan Minzu 四川民足
- Full name: Sichuan Minzu Football Club 四川民足足球俱乐部
- Founded: 1 July 2020; 5 years ago
- Dissolved: April 2022; 3 years ago

Sichuan Minzu Football Club (Chinese: 四川民足足球俱乐部) was a professional Chinese football club. The team was based in Chengdu, Sichuan.

== History ==
Sichuan Huakun F.C. was founded on 1 July 2020. The club participated in Chinese Champions League in 2020 and was promoted to China League Two. In 2021, the club changed its name to Sichuan Minzu F.C.

Sichuan Minzu was dissolved after the 2021 season.

== Name history ==
- 2020 Sichuan Huakun F.C. 四川华昆
- 2021 Sichuan Minzu F.C. 四川民足
