= Yanbian Longding F.C. =

Chinese football club

Yanbian Longding 延边龙鼎
- Full name: Yanbian Longding Football Club 延边龙鼎足球俱乐部
- Founded: 2017; 9 years ago
- Ground: Yanji Stadium
- Capacity: 30,000
- Chairman: Li Guanghe
- Manager: Lee Ki-hyung
- League: China League One
- 2025: China League One, 4th of 16
Home colours	Away colours

Yanbian Longding Football Club (Chinese: 延边龙鼎足球俱乐部; pinyin: Yánbiān Lóngdǐng Zúqiú Jùlèbù; Korean: 연변룡정축구구락부) is a Chinese professional football club based in Yanji, Jilin, that competes in China League One, the second tier of Chinese football. Yanbian Longding plays its home matches at the Yanji Stadium, located within Yanji.

== History ==
The club was founded as Longjing Hailanjiang F.C. in 2017. In 2019, after the dissolution of Yanbian Funde, it was renamed as Yanbian Hailanjiang, and played in 2019 Chinese Champions League.

== Name history ==
- 2017–2018 Longjing Hailanjiang 龙井海兰江
- 2019–2020 Yanbian Hailanjiang 延边海兰江
- 2021- Yanbian Longding 延边龙鼎

== Players ==
=== Current squad ===
As of July 2025

Note: Flags indicate national team as defined under FIFA eligibility rules; some limited exceptions apply. Players may hold more than one non-FIFA nationality.

No.	Pos.	Nation	Player
2	DF	CHN	Che Zeping
4	DF	HKG	Vas Nuñez
5	MF	POR	Joaquim Domingos
6	MF	CHN	Li Ximin
7	MF	CHN	Li Shibin
8	MF	CHN	He Zhenyu
9	FW	CHN	Zong Xuanyu
10	FW	CRC	Felicio Brown Forbes
11	MF	CHN	Chen Keqiang (on loan from Henan FC)
13	GK	CHN	Wang Haocheng
14	MF	CHN	Cui Taixu
15	DF	CHN	Xu Jizu
16	DF	CHN	Xu Wenguang
17	DF	CHN	Piao Shihao
19	DF	CHN	Duan Dezhi (on loan from Yunnan Yukun)
20	DF	CHN	Jin Taiyan

No.	Pos.	Nation	Player
21	GK	CHN	Kou Jiahao
23	MF	CHN	Wang Zihao
28	MF	CHN	Pan Xuanyu (on loan from Ganzhou Ruishi)
29	FW	CHN	Yang Erhai
30	DF	CHN	Huang Zhenfei
31	GK	CHN	Li Shengmin (on loan from Hubei Istar)
32	MF	CHN	Huang Ziming
33	DF	CHN	Hu Ziqian
34	GK	CHN	Yang Yiming
36	MF	CHN	Li Runhao
37	FW	BRA	Giovanny
40	MF	CHN	Jin Xingdong
43	DF	CHN	Cui Xuanyou
45	FW	CHN	Qu Yanheng (on loan from Ningbo FC)

=== Out on loan ===
Note: Flags indicate national team as defined under FIFA eligibility rules; some limited exceptions apply. Players may hold more than one non-FIFA nationality.

No.	Pos.	Nation	Player
—	DF	CHN	Wang Peng (at (China) Dalian Kewei until 31 December 2026)

== Coaching staff ==
=== Management ===
Position	Staff
Head coach	(South Korea) Lee Ki-hyung
Assistant coaches	(China) Lian Renjie (China) Qian Changjie (South Korea) Cho Young-min

== Managerial history ==
- 2019 Jin Qing
- 2019–2022 Li Zaihao
- 2023–2024 Kim Bong-gil
- 2024 Ibán Cuadrado
- 2024– Lee Ki-hyung
