= 2024 Chinese Champions League =

Football league season

Chinese Champions League
- Season: 2024
- Dates: 27 April – 2 November 2024
- Champions: Shenzhen 2028
- Promoted: Shenzhen 2028; Guizhou Zhucheng Athletic; Guangdong Mingtu; Guangzhou Alpha; Changchun Xidu

The 2024 Chinese Champions League, officially known as the Sino-LAC Sports 2024 Chinese Football Association Member Association Champions League (Chinese: 中拉体育2024中国足球协会会员协会冠军联赛) for sponsorship reasons, was the 23rd season of the fourth-tier competition in Chinese football since its establishment in 2002, as well as the 7th season under its current Chinese Champions League (CMCL) title since its rebrand in 2018.

The season began on 27 April 2024.

== Format ==
61 of the 71 teams (originally 75 nominated) are drawn into sixteen groups split into eight centralised host regions. The remaining ten teams are then divided into three qualifying groups to fill up the remaining three spots in the final 64 teams that make up the Regional Tournament.

In the Regional Tournament, the top two-placed teams in each group of a centralised region are placed in a qualifying group. They will then play the two teams originally from the other group from the same host region. The top two teams from each host region progress to the Final Round. The third-placed team in each original group are to play the third-placed team from the other group in the same host region, while the fourth-placed team in each original group are to play the fourth-placed team from the other group in the same host region, finalising the positions for teams in the Regional Tournament for places 5–8.

In the Final Round, which will consist of sixteen teams (two from each host region), teams will be drawn into two groups of eight. The Final Round will see teams compete in a traditional single round-robin home and away schedule. The teams that finish top in each group of the Final Round will be promoted to China League Two, and will in addition play in a two-legged play-off to determine the final winners of the competition. The second- to the fifth-placed teams in each group will play in a promotion play-off, with two winners being promoted to China League Two.

== Teams and team changes ==
=== From CMCL ===
Teams promoted to 2024 China League Two

- Langfang Glory City
- Shenzhen Juniors
- Shaanxi Chang'an Union
- Guangxi Hengchen
- Guangzhou E-Power
- Rizhao Yuqi
- Dalian Huayi
- Xi'an Chongde Ronghai

Teams returned to 2024 Liga de Elite

- Chao Pak Kei

=== Name changes ===
Former name	Current name
Shuozhou Xiangyu	Shanxi Xiangyu
Ningbo Fenghua Haiwei	Ningbo Daxie Jindao
Pingjiang Star	Hunan Tianyueyong
Shunde Entrepreneur	Guangdong Mingtu
Laibin Lanhang Football High School	Guangxi Zuxingtianxia
Xianyang Binzhou Huilong	Shaanxi Northwest Youth
Shaanxi Zhengdian Sports	Yulin Tianzhijiaozi
Xining Representative Team	Qinghai Xining Kunlun
Jinling Athletics	Nanjing Yushen
Wuhan Bofa	Wuhan Juxing Shanyao
Gaosheng Football	Shenzhen 2028

=== Clubs information ===
75 teams from 33 member associations were nominated to participate in the 2024 Chinese Champions League. These are the teams, split into member associations:

Hebei FA

- Shijiazhuang Kicker
- Handan People
- Hebei Xiong'an Glory

Shanxi FA

- Shanxi TYUT Yida
- Shanxi Xiangyu
- Shanxi Longchengren

Inner Mongolia FA

- Inner Mongolia Caoshangfei

Liaoning FA

- Yingkou Chaoyue

Shanghai FA

- Shanghai MHI KLions
- Shanghai Second
- Shanghai Tongji
- Shanghai Luckystar

Jiangsu FA

- Nantong New Dreams

Zhejiang FA

- Ningbo Daxie Jindao

Fujian FA

- Quanzhou Qinggong
- Changle Jingangtui

Shandong FA

- Shandong Scout
- Yantai Ruixiang
- Heze Caozhou
- Zibo Daqi
- Liaocheng Chuanqi

Hunan FA

- Hunan Tianyueyong
- Hunan Xingcheng Xingyi

Guangdong FA

- Guangdong Red Treasure
- Guangzhou Alpha
- Guangdong Mingtu
- Swatow Abstract

Guangxi FA

- Guangxi Yong City
- Guangxi Bushan
- Guangxi Zuxingtianxia
- Nanning Youth

Hainan FA

- Hainan Zhonghong
- Hainan Shuangyu

Chongqing FA

- Chongqing Benbiao
- Chongqing Rich
- Chongqing Handa

Sichuan FA

- Chengdu Yuhui Rende

Guizhou FA

- Qianxinan Xufengtang
- Guizhou OU
- Qiandongnan Miaoling
- Guizhou Zhucheng Athletic

Yunnan FA

- Yunnan Jin Dal Lae
- Qujing EB

Shaanxi FA

- Shaanxi Shan'an
- Yulin Tianzhijiaozi

Gansu FA

- Lanzhou Hailu
- Gannan 92 United Team

Qinghai FA

- Qinghai Xining Kunlun

Ningxia FA

- Pingluo Hengli
- Ningxia Fangzhong

Xinjiang FA

- Xinjiang Dream Maker
- Xinjiang Silk Road Eagle
- Xinjiang Snowland Tiancheng

Shenyang FA

- Shenyang Huiyue

Changchun FA

- Changchun Shenhua
- Changchun Xidu

Yanbian FA

- Yanbian Sports School

Nanjing FA

- Nanjing Yushen
- Jiangsu Landhouse Dong Victory
- Nanjing Tehu

Xiamen FA

- Xiamen Lujiantiancheng
- Xiamen 1026

Qingdao FA

- Qingdao May Wind
- Qingdao Quickboy

Wuhan FA

- Wuhan Lianzhen
- Wuhan Juxing Shanyao
- Wuhan Xiaoma

Shenzhen FA

- Shenzhen 2028
- Shenzhen Jixiang
- Shenzhen Nanshan Shengqing

Kunming FA

- Kunming City

Xi'an FA

- Xi'an Hi-Tech Yilian

Chinese Enterprise Sports Association

- Zibo Home

However, Liaocheng Chuanqi, Hunan Xingcheng Xingyi, Chengdu Yuhui Rende, and Changchun Shenhua were excluded as teams by the time of the regional tournament group draw on 12 April 2024.

== Regional Tournament qualification ==
10 teams are split into 3 groups. Group A matches were hosted in Zhaoqing between 27 April and 3 May, Group B matches were hosted in Zibo between 2 May and 6 May, and Group C matches were hosted in Yulin between 10 May and 14 May. For groups A and B, an extra match between the first-placed team and the second-placed team within the group was played.

Group (Host region)	Team	Location	Member association	Head coach
Group A (Zhaoqing)	Swatow Abstract	Shantou	Guangdong FA	(China) Teng Da
Group A (Zhaoqing)	Nanning Youth	Nanning	Guangxi FA	(China) Huang Feng
Group A (Zhaoqing)	Yunnan Jin Dal Lae	Kunming	Yunnan FA	(South Korea) Lee Young-ik
Group B (Zibo)	Zibo Home	Zibo	Chinese Enterprise Sports Association	(China) Wang Shuo
Group B (Zibo)	Shenyang Huiyue	Shenyang	Shenyang FA	(China) Fang Le
Group B (Zibo)	Nanjing Yushen	Nanjing	Nanjing FA	(China) Bao Peng
Group C (Yulin)	Yulin Tianzhijiaozi	Yulin	Shaanxi FA	(China) Chen Bo
Group C (Yulin)	Inner Mongolia Caoshangfei	Baotou	Inner Mongolia FA	(China) Zhang Hang
Group C (Yulin)	Gannan 92 United Team	Hezuo	Gansu FA	(China) Guo Jun
Group C (Yulin)	Xinjiang Snowland Tiancheng	Ürümqi	Xinjiang FA	(China) Polat Kutulk

=== Group A ===
Pos	Team	Pld	W	D	L	GF	GA	GD	Pts	Qualification
1	Swatow Abstract (Q)	3	3	0	0	11	4	+7	9	Qualification for Regional Tournament
2	Yunnan Jin Dal Lae	3	1	0	2	8	6	+2	3	
3	Nanning Youth	2	0	0	2	0	9	−9	0	

Updated to match(es) played on 3 May 2024. Source:
Rules for classification: 1) Points; 2) Head-to-head points; 3) Head-to-head goal difference; 4) Head-to-head goals scored; 5) If the tiebreaker concerns a qualification place, a penalty shoot-out may be arranged; 6) Goal difference; 7) Goals scored; 8) Disciplinary points (yellow card = 1 point, red card as a result of two yellow cards = 3 points, direct red card = 3 points, yellow card followed by direct red card = 4 points); 9) Drawing of lots.
(Q) Qualified for the phase indicated

27 April 2024	Yunnan Jin Dal Lae	2–3	Swatow Abstract	Zhaoqing
16:00 UTC+8	Huang Ye 67'; Li Shuhan 70'	Report	58', 83', 90' (pen.) Li Xiantao	Stadium: Zhaoqing Sports Centre Stadium; Attendance: 53; Referee: Zhang Yi

29 April 2024	Nanning Youth	0–4	Yunnan Jin Dal Lae	Zhaoqing
16:00 UTC+8		Report	35' Li Shuhan; 54', 73' Qi Bo; 87' He Haohan	Stadium: Zhaoqing Sports Centre Stadium; Attendance: 67

1 May 2024	Swatow Abstract	5–0	Nanning Youth	Zhaoqing
16:00 UTC+8	Chen Zhuo 8'; Liu Yueda 21'; Liang Zhujun 26'; Jiang Jiaqi 76'; Li Xiantao 82'	Report		Stadium: Zhaoqing Sports Centre Stadium; Attendance: 321; Referee: Zheng Shenfei

3 May 2024	Swatow Abstract	3–2	Yunnan Jin Dal Lae	Zhaoqing
16:00 UTC+8	Su Jiarong 42'; Li Xiantao 45+3' (pen.); Liang Jusheng 77'	Report	79' Tan Yanyuan; 86' (pen.) Abduqeyyum	Stadium: Zhaoqing Sports Centre Stadium; Attendance: 288; Referee: Zheng Shenfei
Note: Swatow Abstract and Yunnan Jin Dal Lae qualified to take part in the match for being the first- and second-placed teams within the group respectively.

=== Group B ===
Pos	Team	Pld	W	D	L	GF	GA	GD	Pts	Qualification
1	Zibo Home (Q)	3	2	1	0	6	2	+4	7	Qualification for Regional Tournament
2	Nanjing Yushen	3	1	1	1	4	3	+1	4	
3	Shenyang Huiyue	2	0	0	2	0	5	−5	0	

Updated to match(es) played on 8 May 2024. Source:
Rules for classification: 1) Points; 2) Head-to-head points; 3) Head-to-head goal difference; 4) Head-to-head goals scored; 5) If the tiebreaker concerns a qualification place, a penalty shoot-out may be arranged; 6) Goal difference; 7) Goals scored; 8) Disciplinary points (yellow card = 1 point, red card as a result of two yellow cards = 3 points, direct red card = 3 points, yellow card followed by direct red card = 4 points); 9) Drawing of lots.
(Q) Qualified for the phase indicated

2 May 2024	Nanjing Yushen	1–1	Zibo Home	Zibo
15:30 UTC+8	Bai Yang 34'	Report	11' Ma Long	Stadium: Zibo Sports Center Stadium; Attendance: 393

4 May 2024	Shenyang Huiyue	0–2	Nanjing Yushen	Zibo
15:30 UTC+8		Report	45+1' Liu Jianxin; 59' Bai Yang	Stadium: Zibo Sports Center Stadium; Attendance: 39

6 May 2024	Zibo Home	3–0	Shenyang Huiyue	Zibo
19:00 UTC+8	Liu Baochuan 14'; Tan Tiancheng 54'; Sun Zhaoliang 90+2'	Report		Stadium: Zibo Sports Center Stadium; Attendance: 323

8 May 2024	Zibo Home	2–1	Nanjing Yushen	Zibo
19:00 UTC+8	Zhang Tianxiang 10'; Tan Tiancheng 25' (pen.)	Report	2' Teng Shuai	Stadium: Zibo Sports Center Stadium; Attendance: 631
Note: Zibo Home and Nanjing Yushen qualified to take part in the match for being the first- and second-placed teams within the group respectively.

=== Group C ===
Pos	Team	Pld	W	D	L	GF	GA	GD	Pts	Qualification
1	Xinjiang Snowland Tiancheng (Q)	3	3	0	0	13	1	+12	9	Qualification for Regional Tournament
2	Yulin Tianzhijiaozi	3	2	0	1	15	3	+12	6	
3	Inner Mongolia Caoshangfei	3	1	0	2	3	17	−14	3	
4	Gannan 92 United Team	3	0	0	3	0	10	−10	0	

Updated to match(es) played on 14 May 2024. Source:
Rules for classification: 1) Points; 2) Head-to-head points; 3) Head-to-head goal difference; 4) Head-to-head goals scored; 5) If the tiebreaker concerns a qualification place, a penalty shoot-out may be arranged; 6) Goal difference; 7) Goals scored; 8) Disciplinary points (yellow card = 1 point, red card as a result of two yellow cards = 3 points, direct red card = 3 points, yellow card followed by direct red card = 4 points); 9) Drawing of lots.
(Q) Qualified for the phase indicated

10 May 2024	Inner Mongolia Caoshangfei	2–0	Gannan 92 United Team	Yulin
16:00 UTC+8	Han Yongbin 3', 68'	Report		Stadium: Yulin Sports Center Stadium; Attendance: 610

10 May 2024	Yulin Tianzhijiaozi	1–2	Xinjiang Snowland Tiancheng	Yulin
19:00 UTC+8	Wang Xiaole 81'	Report	21' (pen.) Elzat; 39' Muhamet	Stadium: Yulin Sports Center Stadium; Attendance: 1,238

12 May 2024	Xinjiang Snowland Tiancheng	8–0	Inner Mongolia Caoshangfei	Yulin
14:00 UTC+8	Ekber 16', 33'; Muhamet 50', 64', 72', 90+3'; Yasinjan 56'; Irpan 61'	Report		Stadium: Yulin Sports Center Stadium; Attendance: 726

12 May 2024	Gannan 92 United Team	0–5	Yulin Tianzhijiaozi	Yulin
17:00 UTC+8		Report	48', 90+2' Merdan; 56', 89' Zhang Shuai; 90' Kong Lingyi	Stadium: Yulin Sports Center Stadium; Attendance: 3,623

14 May 2024	Gannan 92 United Team	0–3	Xinjiang Snowland Tiancheng	Yulin
16:00 UTC+8		Report	7' Abdusemi; 63' Elimurat; 89' Bulgyar	Stadium: Yulin Sports Center Stadium; Attendance: 226

14 May 2024	Yulin Tianzhijiaozi	9–1	Inner Mongolia Caoshangfei	Yulin
19:00 UTC+8	Merdan 3', 6', 51', 55', 61', 73'; He Jian 21'; Wang Chao 25'; Zhang Shuai 56'	Report	45+2' Han Yongbin	Stadium: Yulin Sports Center Stadium; Attendance: 4,200

== Regional Tournament teams ==
64 teams will be qualified to compete in the 2024 Chinese Champions League Regional Tournament, with 61 teams gaining direct entry, and three coming from the qualification process. These 64 teams are placed into 16 groups, with two each being hosted in these eight host regions: Qujing, Guigang, Zhangzhou, Wuhan, Ürümqi, Weifang, Rizhao, and Yingkou.

=== Teams and member associations ===
Host region	Group	Team	Location	Member association	Head coach
Qujing	Group D	Qujing EB	Qujing	Yunnan FA	(China) He Yunqun
Qujing	Group D	Chongqing Rich	Chongqing	Chongqing FA	(China) Tang Zhenzhen
Qujing	Group D	Guizhou OU	Guiyang	Guizhou FA	(China) Chen Mao
Qujing	Group D	Swatow Abstract (Note: Swatow Abstract qualified for the Regional Tournament as winners of Group A.)	Shantou	Guangdong FA	(China) Teng Da
Qujing	Group E	Kunming City	Kunming	Yunnan FA	(England) Colm Toal
Qujing	Group E	Chongqing Benbiao	Chongqing	Chongqing FA	(China) Zu Wentao
Qujing	Group E	Guangxi Yong City	Nanning	Guangxi FA	(China) Xu Ning (interim)
Qujing	Group E	Qianxinan Xufengtang	Xingyi	Guizhou FA	(Spain) Sergio Castro Boyano
Guigang	Group F	Guangxi Bushan	Guigang	Guangxi FA	(China) Huang Hongyi
Guigang	Group F	Qiandongnan Miaoling	Kaili	Guizhou FA	(China) Long Tao (team leader)
Guigang	Group F	Guangdong Mingtu	Guangzhou	Guangdong FA	(China) Guo Yijun
Guigang	Group F	Hainan Shuangyu	Haikou	Hainan FA	(China) Wang Xiuzhi
Guigang	Group G	Guangdong Red Treasure	Guangzhou	Guangdong FA	(China) Wu Wenbing
Guigang	Group G	Hainan Zhonghong	Sanya	Hainan FA	(China) Mo Zhonglin
Guigang	Group G	Guizhou Zhucheng Athletic	Guiyang	Guizhou FA	(China) Zhu Jiong
Guigang	Group G	Guangxi Zuxingtianxia	Nanning	Guangxi FA	(China) Zhao Ding
Zhangzhou	Group H	Xiamen 1026	Xiamen	Xiamen FA	(China) Huang Shibo
Zhangzhou	Group H	Ningbo Daxie Jindao	Ningbo	Zhejiang FA	(China) Zhu Qi
Zhangzhou	Group H	Shanghai Luckystar	Shanghai	Shanghai FA	(China) Shen Wenxian
Zhangzhou	Group H	Shenzhen Nanshan Shengqing	Shenzhen	Shenzhen FA	(China) Shi Ludong
Zhangzhou	Group I	Shanghai Tongji	Shanghai	Shanghai FA	(China) Xu Lei
Zhangzhou	Group I	Hunan Tianyueyong	Changsha	Hunan FA	(China) Jie Lei
Zhangzhou	Group I	Shenzhen 2028	Shenzhen	Shenzhen FA	(China) Wang Dong
Zhangzhou	Group I	Xiamen Lujiantiancheng	Xiamen	Xiamen FA	(China) Wang Xiaolong
Wuhan	Group J	Wuhan Lianzhen	Wuhan	Wuhan FA	(China) Zhou Hang
Wuhan	Group J	Changle Jingangtui	Fuzhou	Fujian FA	(China) Guo Yabin
Wuhan	Group J	Chongqing Handa	Chongqing	Chongqing FA	(China) Wang Xiang
Wuhan	Group J	Shenzhen Jixiang	Shenzhen	Shenzhen FA	(China) Yu Le
Wuhan	Group K	Wuhan Xiaoma	Wuhan	Wuhan FA	(Bulgaria) Adalbert Zafirov
Wuhan	Group K	Guangzhou Alpha	Guangzhou	Guangdong FA	(China) Tan Ende
Wuhan	Group K	Chongqing Chunlei	Chongqing	Chongqing FA	(China) Tong Qiang
Wuhan	Group K	Quanzhou Qinggong	Quanzhou	Fujian FA	(China) Zhao Wanli
Ürümqi	Group L	Xinjiang Dream Maker	Ürümqi	Xinjiang FA	(South Korea) Cheon Min-chul
Ürümqi	Group L	Xinjiang Snowland Tiancheng (Note: Xinjiang Snowland Tiancheng qualified for the Regional Tournament as winners of Group C.)	Ürümqi	Xinjiang FA	(China) Polat Kutulk
Ürümqi	Group L	Ningxia Fangzhong	Yinchuan	Ningxia FA	(China) Sui Yu
Ürümqi	Group L	Qinghai Xining Kunlun	Xining	Qinghai FA	(China) Feng Jie
Ürümqi	Group M	Xi'an Hi-Tech Yilian	Xi'an	Xi'an FA	(China) Huang Qixiang
Ürümqi	Group M	Xinjiang Silk Road Eagle	Ürümqi	Xinjiang FA	(Spain) Fernando Sánchez
Ürümqi	Group M	Pingluo Hengli	Pingluo	Ningxia FA	(China) Sun Fenghao
Ürümqi	Group M	Lanzhou Hailu	Lanzhou	Gansu FA	(China) Jiang Shilin
Weifang	Group N	Shandong Scout	Linyi	Shandong FA	(China) Xie Huan
Weifang	Group N	Hebei Xiong'an Glory	Anxin	Hebei FA	(China) Cheng Yanjun
Weifang	Group N	Shaanxi Shan'an	Xi'an	Shaanxi FA	(China) Liu Chengjun
Weifang	Group N	Nantong New Dreams	Hai'an	Jiangsu FA	(China) Liu Yong
Weifang	Group O	Shijiazhuang Kicker	Shijiazhuang	Hebei FA	(China) Liu Siyang
Weifang	Group O	Zibo Daqi	Zibo	Shandong FA	(China) Liu Meng
Weifang	Group O	Shaanxi Northwest Youth	Xi'an	Shaanxi FA	(China) Zhang Yong
Weifang	Group O	Zibo Home (Note: Zibo Home qualified for the Regional Tournament as winners of Group B.)	Zibo	Chinese Enterprise Sports Association	(China) Wang Shuo
Rizhao	Group P	Qingdao May Wind	Qingdao	Qingdao FA	(China) Song Bo
Rizhao	Group P	Shanxi TYUT Yida	Taiyuan	Shanxi FA	(China) Wu Jianwen
Rizhao	Group P	Nanjing Tehu	Nanjing	Nanjing FA	(China) Tang Bo
Rizhao	Group P	Shanghai Second	Shanghai	Shanghai FA	(Spain) Miguel Salvador Ruiz
Rizhao	Group Q	Jiangsu Landhouse Dong Victory	Nanjing	Nanjing FA	(China) Lu Feng
Rizhao	Group Q	Wuhan Juxing Shanyao	Wuhan	Wuhan FA	(China) Yu Wu
Rizhao	Group Q	Qingdao Quickboy	Qingdao	Qingdao FA	(China) Qu Bo
Rizhao	Group Q	Shanghai MHI KLions	Shanghai	Shanghai FA	(China) Zhu Jianmin
Yingkou	Group R	Yingkou Chaoyue	Yingkou	Liaoning FA	(China) Ma Kai
Yingkou	Group R	Yanbian Sports School	Yanji	Yanbian FA	(China) Bai Shenghu
Yingkou	Group R	Shanxi Xiangyu	Shuozhou	Shanxi FA	(China) Li Dong
Yingkou	Group R	Yantai Ruixiang	Yantai	Shandong FA	(China) Xie Han
Yingkou	Group S	Shanxi Longchengren	Taiyuan	Shanxi FA	(China) Cao Tianbao
Yingkou	Group S	Heze Caozhou	Heze	Shandong FA	(China) Xiang Fujun
Yingkou	Group S	Handan People	Handan	Hebei FA	(China) Yan Hui
Yingkou	Group S	Changchun Xidu	Changchun	Changchun FA	(China) Li Bin

== Regional Tournament ==
The fixtures for the 2024 Chinese Champions League (CMCL) Regional Tournament were announced on 16 April.

=== Qujing ===
==== Group D ====
Pos	Team	Pld	W	D	L	GF	GA	GD	Pts	Qualification
1	Qujing EB (Q)	3	3	0	0	8	0	+8	9	Qualification for Qualifying round
2	Swatow Abstract (Q)	3	1	1	1	3	5	−2	4	Qualification for Qualifying round
3	Chongqing Rich	3	1	0	2	2	4	−2	3	Qualification for Third-placed play-offs
4	Guizhou OU	3	0	1	2	2	6	−4	1	Qualification for Fourth-placed play-offs

Updated to match(es) played on 30 June 2024. Source: Chinese Champions League
Rules for classification: 1) Points; 2) Head-to-head points; 3) Head-to-head goal difference; 4) Head-to-head goals scored; 5) If the tiebreaker concerns a qualification place, a penalty shoot-out may be arranged; 6) Goal difference; 7) Goals scored; 8) Disciplinary points (yellow card = 1 point, red card as a result of two yellow cards = 3 points, direct red card = 3 points, yellow card followed by direct red card = 4 points); 9) Drawing of lots.
(Q) Qualified for the phase indicated

26 June 2024	Chongqing Rich	2–0	Guizhou OU	Qujing
16:30 UTC+8	Xiang Jun 20', 71'	Report		Stadium: Qujing Cultural and Sports Park Stadium; Attendance: 268

26 June 2024	Qujing EB	3–0	Swatow Abstract	Qujing
19:30 UTC+8	Zhao Yihao 32'; He Yuchen 51'; Yang Junjie 59'	Report		Stadium: Qujing Cultural and Sports Park Stadium; Attendance: 2,380

28 June 2024	Swatow Abstract	1–0	Chongqing Rich	Qujing
16:30 UTC+8	Lin Junbo 37'	Report		Stadium: Qujing Cultural and Sports Park Stadium; Attendance: 233

28 June 2024	Guizhou OU	0–2	Qujing EB	Qujing
19:30 UTC+8		Report	12' Zhang Hongyu; 55' Tan Zhenyu	Stadium: Qujing Cultural and Sports Park Stadium; Attendance: 2,047

30 June 2024	Qujing EB	3–0	Chongqing Rich	Qujing
17:00 UTC+8	Zhao Yihao 65', 82'; Tan Zhenyu 66'	Report		Stadium: Qujing Cultural and Sports Park Stadium; Attendance: 1,477

30 June 2024	Guizhou OU	2–2	Swatow Abstract	Qujing
17:00 UTC+8	Luo Jiangtao 54'; Sima Le 90+3'	Report	45+3' Chen Zhuo; 76' Mei Birui	Stadium: Yibu Football Park; Attendance: 96

==== Group E ====
Pos	Team	Pld	W	D	L	GF	GA	GD	Pts	Qualification
1	Kunming City (Q)	3	2	1	0	12	2	+10	7	Qualification for Qualifying round
2	Qianxinan Xufengtang (Q)	3	2	1	0	7	2	+5	7	Qualification for Qualifying round
3	Chongqing Benbiao	3	1	0	2	5	5	0	3	Qualification for Third-placed play-offs
4	Guangxi Yong City	3	0	0	3	1	16	−15	0	Qualification for Fourth-placed play-offs

Updated to match(es) played on 30 June 2024. Source: Chinese Champions League
Rules for classification: 1) Points; 2) Head-to-head points; 3) Head-to-head goal difference; 4) Head-to-head goals scored; 5) If the tiebreaker concerns a qualification place, a penalty shoot-out may be arranged; 6) Goal difference; 7) Goals scored; 8) Disciplinary points (yellow card = 1 point, red card as a result of two yellow cards = 3 points, direct red card = 3 points, yellow card followed by direct red card = 4 points); 9) Drawing of lots.
(Q) Qualified for the phase indicated

26 June 2024	Kunming City	1–1	Qianxinan Xufengtang	Qujing
14:00 UTC+8	Lu Tianming 70'	Report	54' Ma Canjie	Stadium: Yibu Football Park; Attendance: 114

26 June 2024	Chongqing Benbiao	4–0	Guangxi Yong City	Qujing
17:00 UTC+8	Liu Weizhen 5'; Wu Junkui 50', 64'; Cai Ruiting 60'	Report		Stadium: Yibu Football Park; Attendance: 104

28 June 2024	Qianxinan Xufengtang	2–0	Chongqing Benbiao	Qujing
14:00 UTC+8	Wang Hao 2'; Song Hanchuan 79'	Report		Stadium: Yibu Football Park; Attendance: 106

28 June 2024	Guangxi Yong City	0–8	Kunming City	Qujing
17:00 UTC+8		Report	2' Cao Enze; 4', 50' Lu Tianming; 17', 48' (pen.) Chen Junzhou; 21' Zhang Xu; 63' Xuan Ye; 90+3' Yu Zichun	Stadium: Yibu Football Park; Attendance: 89

30 June 2024	Kunming City	3–1	Chongqing Benbiao	Qujing
14:00 UTC+8	Chen Junzhou 67'; Zhang Xu 79'; Xuan Ye 84'	Report	85' Zhang Xu	Stadium: Qujing Cultural and Sports Park Stadium; Attendance: 213

30 June 2024	Guangxi Yong City	1–4	Qianxinan Xufengtang	Qujing
14:00 UTC+8	Cao Zichu 67'	Report	24', 65' Cen Shuai; 25' Jüshighun; 41' Shirmemet	Stadium: Yibu Football Park; Attendance: 181

=== Guigang ===
==== Group F ====
Pos	Team	Pld	W	D	L	GF	GA	GD	Pts	Qualification
1	Guangdong Mingtu (Q)	3	2	1	0	18	0	+18	7	Qualification for Qualifying round
2	Guangxi Bushan (Q)	3	2	1	0	10	0	+10	7	Qualification for Qualifying round
3	Qiandongnan Miaoling	3	0	1	2	0	14	−14	1	Qualification for Third-placed play-offs
4	Hainan Shuangyu	3	0	1	2	0	14	−14	1	Qualification for Fourth-placed play-offs

Updated to match(es) played on 21 May 2024. Source: Chinese Champions League
Rules for classification: 1) Points; 2) Head-to-head points; 3) Head-to-head goal difference; 4) Head-to-head goals scored; 5) If the tiebreaker concerns a qualification place, a penalty shoot-out may be arranged; 6) Goal difference; 7) Goals scored; 8) Disciplinary points (yellow card = 1 point, red card as a result of two yellow cards = 3 points, direct red card = 3 points, yellow card followed by direct red card = 4 points); 9) Drawing of lots.
(Q) Qualified for the phase indicated

17 May 2024	Qiandongnan Miaoling	0–10	Guangdong Mingtu	Guigang
16:30 UTC+8		Report	8' Huang Guowei; 10' (pen.) Cai Shaoyang; 22', 48', 58', 74' Wei Xiangxin; 37' Zhu Xinyu; 62' Chen Lunjing; 72' Fang Kairui; 90+1' Luo Hongbao	Stadium: Guigang Sports Centre Stadium; Attendance: 33; Referee: Li Qi

17 May 2024	Guangxi Bushan	6–0	Hainan Shuangyu	Guigang
19:30 UTC+8	Cao Zhenquan 5', 78'; Chagtsel 26'; Yang Wenjie 40'; Zhang Jianshi 83' (o.g.); Gao Zilong 86'	Report		Stadium: Guigang Sports Centre Stadium; Attendance: 16,211; Referee: Huang Baosheng

19 May 2024	Hainan Shuangyu	0–0	Qiandongnan Miaoling	Guigang
16:30 UTC+8		Report		Stadium: Guigang Sports Centre Stadium; Attendance: 81

19 May 2024	Guangdong Mingtu	0–0	Guangxi Bushan	Guigang
19:30 UTC+8		Report		Stadium: Guigang Sports Centre Stadium; Attendance: 5,746

21 May 2024	Guangxi Bushan	4–0	Qiandongnan Miaoling	Guigang
19:30 UTC+8	Huang Zhaoyi 32'; Wang Minghao 45'; Chagtsel 51', 90+3' (pen.)	Report		Stadium: Guigang Sports Centre Stadium; Attendance: 7,319

21 May 2024	Guangdong Mingtu	8–0	Hainan Shuangyu	Guigang
19:30 UTC+8	Fang Kairui 3', 37', 70'; Yin Bowen 17'; Zhong Juncheng 50'; Li Tianyou 54'; Pan Nuojun 73'; Wu Zhengxian 86'	Report		Stadium: Jiuling Lake Football Training Centre Field 1 Attendance: 22

==== Group G ====
Pos	Team	Pld	W	D	L	GF	GA	GD	Pts	Qualification
1	Guizhou Zhucheng Athletic (Q)	3	2	1	0	7	2	+5	7	Qualification for Qualifying round
2	Guangdong Red Treasure (Q)	3	1	2	0	3	1	+2	5	Qualification for Qualifying round
3	Guangxi Zuxingtianxia	3	1	1	1	9	5	+4	4	Qualification for Third-placed play-offs
4	Hainan Zhonghong	3	0	0	3	1	12	−11	0	Qualification for Fourth-placed play-offs

Updated to match(es) played on 21 May 2024. Source: Chinese Champions League
Rules for classification: 1) Points; 2) Head-to-head points; 3) Head-to-head goal difference; 4) Head-to-head goals scored; 5) If the tiebreaker concerns a qualification place, a penalty shoot-out may be arranged; 6) Goal difference; 7) Goals scored; 8) Disciplinary points (yellow card = 1 point, red card as a result of two yellow cards = 3 points, direct red card = 3 points, yellow card followed by direct red card = 4 points); 9) Drawing of lots.
(Q) Qualified for the phase indicated

17 May 2024	Guangdong Red Treasure	1–1	Guangxi Zuxingtianxia	Guigang
16:30 UTC+8	Kong Yinquan 15' (pen.)	Report	8' (pen.) Imran	Stadium: Jiuling Lake Football Training Centre Field 1 Attendance: 30; Referee: Xie Chenyao

17 May 2024	Hainan Zhonghong	1–3	Guizhou Zhucheng Athletic	Guigang
19:30 UTC+8	Zhang Xuecheng 80'	Report	34' Lu Wentao; 61' Zhang Jiaxin; 64' Ular	Stadium: Jiuling Lake Football Training Centre Field 1 Attendance: 25; Referee: Zhong Xiaolin

19 May 2024	Guangxi Zuxingtianxia	7–0	Hainan Zhonghong	Guigang
16:30 UTC+8	Chen Xiaolong 23'; Imran 34', 45+2', 68'; He Lijia 69'; Luo Benxing 76'; Xian Haihui 90'	Report		Stadium: Jiuling Lake Football Training Centre Field 1 Attendance: 25

19 May 2024	Guizhou Zhucheng Athletic	0–0	Guangdong Red Treasure	Guigang
19:30 UTC+8		Report		Stadium: Jiuling Lake Football Training Centre Field 1 Attendance: 45

21 May 2024	Guangdong Red Treasure	2–0	Hainan Zhonghong	Guigang
16:30 UTC+8	Li Haoran 42', 45+1'	Report		Stadium: Guigang Sports Centre Stadium; Attendance: 36

21 May 2024	Guizhou Zhucheng Athletic	4–1	Guangxi Zuxingtianxia	Guigang
16:30 UTC+8	Huang Cong 45+1'; Shi Yiyi 50', 67'; Xie Jinzheng 84'	Report	90' (pen.) Imran	Stadium: Jiuling Lake Football Training Centre Field 1 Attendance: 33

=== Zhangzhou ===
==== Group H ====
Pos	Team	Pld	W	D	L	GF	GA	GD	Pts	Qualification
1	Xiamen 1026 (Q)	3	2	1	0	9	1	+8	7	Qualification for Qualifying round
2	Ningbo Daxie Jindao (Q)	3	2	0	1	2	4	−2	6	Qualification for Qualifying round
3	Shenzhen Nanshan Shengqing	3	1	1	1	2	2	0	4	Qualification for Third-placed play-offs
4	Shanghai Luckystar	3	0	0	3	0	6	−6	0	Qualification for Fourth-placed play-offs

Updated to match(es) played on 6 June 2024. Source: Chinese Champions League
Rules for classification: 1) Points; 2) Head-to-head points; 3) Head-to-head goal difference; 4) Head-to-head goals scored; 5) If the tiebreaker concerns a qualification place, a penalty shoot-out may be arranged; 6) Goal difference; 7) Goals scored; 8) Disciplinary points (yellow card = 1 point, red card as a result of two yellow cards = 3 points, direct red card = 3 points, yellow card followed by direct red card = 4 points); 9) Drawing of lots.
(Q) Qualified for the phase indicated

2 June 2024	Xiamen 1026	1–1	Shenzhen Nanshan Shengqing	Zhangpu
15:00 UTC+8	Tan Xiang 73'		69' Zhang Enge	Stadium: HOORAY International Football Training Base Field A1; Attendance: 480

2 June 2024	Ningbo Daxie Jindao	1–0	Shanghai Luckystar	Zhangpu
17:15 UTC+8	Jin Wu 47' (pen.)			Stadium: HOORAY International Football Training Base Field A1; Attendance: 360

4 June 2024	Shenzhen Nanshan Shengqing	0–1	Ningbo Daxie Jindao	Zhangpu
14:00 UTC+8		Report	89' Yu Xiang	Stadium: HOORAY International Football Training Base Field A1; Attendance: 366

4 June 2024	Shanghai Luckystar	0–4	Xiamen 1026	Zhangpu
16:15 UTC+8		Report	8', 45' Zong Keyi; 10' Song Haiwang; 23' Zhong Jiyu	Stadium: HOORAY International Football Training Base Field A1; Attendance: 520

6 June 2024	Xiamen 1026	4–0	Ningbo Daxie Jindao	Zhangpu
16:15 UTC+8	Zhang Yue 23'; Song Haiwang 48'; Tan Xiang 50', 69'	Report		Stadium: HOORAY International Football Training Base Field A1; Attendance: 206

6 June 2024	Shanghai Luckystar	0–1	Shenzhen Nanshan Shengqing	Zhangpu
16:15 UTC+8		Report	11' Chen Zhengfeng	Stadium: HOORAY International Football Training Base Field A5; Attendance: 122

==== Group I ====
Pos	Team	Pld	W	D	L	GF	GA	GD	Pts	Qualification
1	Shenzhen 2028 (Q)	3	3	0	0	15	1	+14	9	Qualification for Qualifying round
2	Xiamen Lujiantiancheng (Q)	3	2	0	1	10	9	+1	6	Qualification for Qualifying round
3	Hunan Tianyueyong	3	0	1	2	6	11	−5	1	Qualification for Third-placed play-offs
4	Shanghai Tongji	3	0	1	2	5	15	−10	1	Qualification for Fourth-placed play-offs

Updated to match(es) played on 6 June 2024. Source: Chinese Champions League
Rules for classification: 1) Points; 2) Head-to-head points; 3) Head-to-head goal difference; 4) Head-to-head goals scored; 5) If the tiebreaker concerns a qualification place, a penalty shoot-out may be arranged; 6) Goal difference; 7) Goals scored; 8) Disciplinary points (yellow card = 1 point, red card as a result of two yellow cards = 3 points, direct red card = 3 points, yellow card followed by direct red card = 4 points); 9) Drawing of lots.
(Q) Qualified for the phase indicated

2 June 2024	Shanghai Tongji	3–6	Xiamen Lujiantiancheng	Zhangpu
15:00 UTC+8	Zhao Yuan 6' (pen.); Yu Zicheng 56'; Zhu Zhengrong 90+3'	Report	14' (pen.) Li Minhui; 28' Liu Yao; 55', 58', 87' Li Guo; 73' Lin Zekun	Stadium: HOORAY International Football Training Base Field A5; Attendance: 31

2 June 2024	Hunan Tianyueyong	1–5	Shenzhen 2028	Zhangpu
17:15 UTC+8	Huang Xu 69'	Report	13' (pen.), 45+1' Luan Cheng; 20' Huang Zishun; 64' Wang Zhiyuan; 84' Jiang Wenjing	Stadium: HOORAY International Football Training Base Field A5; Attendance: 17

4 June 2024	Xiamen Lujiantiancheng	4–3	Hunan Tianyueyong	Zhangpu
14:00 UTC+8	Li Guo 33', 45+1', 90'; Liu Yao 41'	Report	13', 67' Liu Chengyu; 59' Qin Weikang	Stadium: HOORAY International Football Training Base Field A5; Attendance: 137

4 June 2024	Shenzhen 2028	7–0	Shanghai Tongji	Zhangpu
16:15 UTC+8	Li Mingjie 17'; Jiang Wenjing 38'; Shi Zihao 53'; Wei Honglin 69' (o.g.); Wang Zhiyuan 69'; Li Lehang 80', 88'	Report		Stadium: HOORAY International Football Training Base Field A5; Attendance: 159

6 June 2024	Shanghai Tongji	2–2	Hunan Tianyueyong	Zhangpu
14:00 UTC+8	Liu Zhibo 24'; Pan Junjie 33'	Report	35', 71' Liao Renzhi	Stadium: HOORAY International Football Training Base Field A1; Attendance: 320

6 June 2024	Shenzhen 2028	3–0	Xiamen Lujiantiancheng	Zhangpu
16:15 UTC+8	Jiang Wenjing 47'; Wang Zhiyuan 58'; Deng Zhitao 90+2'	Report		Stadium: HOORAY International Football Training Base Field A5; Attendance: 148

=== Wuhan ===
==== Group J ====
Pos	Team	Pld	W	D	L	GF	GA	GD	Pts	Qualification
1	Wuhan Lianzhen (Q)	3	3	0	0	4	0	+4	9	Qualification for Qualifying round
2	Shenzhen Jixiang (Q)	3	2	0	1	3	1	+2	6	Qualification for Qualifying round
3	Changle Jingangtui	3	1	0	2	1	3	−2	3	Qualification for Third-placed play-offs
4	Chongqing Handa	3	0	0	3	0	4	−4	0	Qualification for Fourth-placed play-offs

Updated to match(es) played on 17 June 2024. Source: Chinese Champions League
Rules for classification: 1) Points; 2) Head-to-head points; 3) Head-to-head goal difference; 4) Head-to-head goals scored; 5) If the tiebreaker concerns a qualification place, a penalty shoot-out may be arranged; 6) Goal difference; 7) Goals scored; 8) Disciplinary points (yellow card = 1 point, red card as a result of two yellow cards = 3 points, direct red card = 3 points, yellow card followed by direct red card = 4 points); 9) Drawing of lots.
(Q) Qualified for the phase indicated

13 June 2024	Changle Jingangtui	1–0	Chongqing Handa	Wuhan
16:30 UTC+8	Ren Zhihao 90+3'	Report		Stadium: Tazi Lake Sports Centre Field 3 Attendance: 56

13 June 2024	Wuhan Lianzhen	1–0	Shenzhen Jixiang	Wuhan
19:30 UTC+8	Fan Xiaobin 34'	Report		Stadium: Tazi Lake Sports Centre Field 3 Attendance: 1,023

15 June 2024	Shenzhen Jixiang	1–0	Changle Jingangtui	Wuhan
16:30 UTC+8	Ling Sihao 5'	Report		Stadium: Tazi Lake Sports Centre Field 3 Attendance: 309

15 June 2024	Chongqing Handa	0–1	Wuhan Lianzhen	Wuhan
19:30 UTC+8		Report	15' Liu Fule	Stadium: Tazi Lake Sports Centre Field 3 Attendance: 516

17 June 2024	Wuhan Lianzhen	2–0	Changle Jingangtui	Wuhan
16:30 UTC+8	Wei Zhaokun 47'; Fan Jinrui 71'	Report		Stadium: Tazi Lake Sports Centre Field 3 Attendance: 173

17 June 2024	Chongqing Handa	0–2	Shenzhen Jixiang	Wuhan
19:30 UTC+8		Report	88' Enysar; 90+3' Ilhamjan	Stadium: Tazi Lake Sports Centre Field 2 Attendance: 234

==== Group K ====
Pos	Team	Pld	W	D	L	GF	GA	GD	Pts	Qualification
1	Guangzhou Alpha (Q)	3	2	1	0	7	2	+5	7	Qualification for Qualifying round
2	Quanzhou Qinggong (Q)	3	1	1	1	2	4	−2	4	Qualification for Qualifying round
3	Chongqing Chunlei	3	0	3	0	4	4	0	3	Qualification for Third-placed play-offs
4	Wuhan Xiaoma	3	0	1	2	3	6	−3	1	Qualification for Fourth-placed play-offs

Updated to match(es) played on 17 June 2024. Source: Chinese Champions League
Rules for classification: 1) Points; 2) Head-to-head points; 3) Head-to-head goal difference; 4) Head-to-head goals scored; 5) If the tiebreaker concerns a qualification place, a penalty shoot-out may be arranged; 6) Goal difference; 7) Goals scored; 8) Disciplinary points (yellow card = 1 point, red card as a result of two yellow cards = 3 points, direct red card = 3 points, yellow card followed by direct red card = 4 points); 9) Drawing of lots.
(Q) Qualified for the phase indicated

13 June 2024	Wuhan Xiaoma	0–1	Quanzhou Qinggong	Wuhan
16:30 UTC+8		Report	63' Liang Huan	Stadium: Tazi Lake Sports Centre Field 2 Attendance: 157

13 June 2024	Guangzhou Alpha	1–1	Chongqing Chunlei	Wuhan
19:30 UTC+8	Tan Jiajun 70'	Report	81' Gao Yuyang	Stadium: Tazi Lake Sports Centre Field 2 Attendance: 109

15 June 2024	Quanzhou Qinggong	0–3	Guangzhou Alpha	Wuhan
16:30 UTC+8		Report	6' Liang Junheng; 8' Zhong Juzhan; 78' Yang Youxian	Stadium: Tazi Lake Sports Centre Field 2 Attendance: 56

15 June 2024	Chongqing Chunlei	2–2	Wuhan Xiaoma	Wuhan
19:30 UTC+8	Jing Kuanjie 64'; Wei Peng 82' (o.g.)	Report	55' Yang Shaochen; 70' Liu Runnan	Stadium: Tazi Lake Sports Centre Field 2 Attendance: 107

17 June 2024	Wuhan Xiaoma	1–3	Guangzhou Alpha	Wuhan
16:30 UTC+8	Jenisbek 68'	Report	9' Tan Jiajun; 37' Yang Youxian; 84' Liang Yibin	Stadium: Tazi Lake Sports Centre Field 3 Attendance: 78

17 June 2024	Chongqing Chunlei	1–1	Quanzhou Qinggong	Wuhan
19:30 UTC+8	Tan Liwei 61' (pen.)	Report	43' Liang Huan	Stadium: Tazi Lake Sports Centre Field 2 Attendance: 78

=== Ürümqi ===
==== Group L ====
Pos	Team	Pld	W	D	L	GF	GA	GD	Pts	Qualification
1	Xinjiang Snowland Tiancheng (Q)	3	1	2	0	5	3	+2	5	Qualification for Qualifying round
2	Qinghai Xining Kunlun (Q)	3	1	2	0	6	2	+4	5	Qualification for Qualifying round
3	Xinjiang Dream Maker	3	1	2	0	5	3	+2	5	Qualification for Third-placed play-offs
4	Ningxia Fangzhong	3	0	0	3	4	12	−8	0	Qualification for Fourth-placed play-offs

Updated to match(es) played on 18 June 2024. Source: Chinese Champions League
Rules for classification: 1) Points; 2) Head-to-head points; 3) Head-to-head goal difference; 4) Head-to-head goals scored; 5) If the tiebreaker concerns a qualification place, a penalty shoot-out may be arranged; 6) Goal difference; 7) Goals scored; 8) Disciplinary points (yellow card = 1 point, red card as a result of two yellow cards = 3 points, direct red card = 3 points, yellow card followed by direct red card = 4 points); 9) Drawing of lots.
(Q) Qualified for the phase indicated

14 June 2024	Ningxia Fangzhong	1–5	Qinghai Xining Kunlun	Ürümqi
15:30 UTC+8	He Jiaxin 73'	Report	6' Nurzat; 54' Li Jiqiang; 58' Si Junyan; 76' (pen.) Huang Kaizhou; 82' Shi Jingyu	Stadium: Ürümqi Olympic Sports Center Stadium Outer Field; Attendance: 86

14 June 2024	Xinjiang Dream Maker	1–1	Xinjiang Snowland Tiancheng	Ürümqi
18:00 UTC+8	Alimjan 45+2'	Report	30' Sherzat	Stadium: Ürümqi Olympic Sports Center Stadium; Attendance: 589

16 June 2024	Ningxia Fangzhong	2–4	Xinjiang Dream Maker	Ürümqi
18:30 UTC+8	Mehmudjan 45+2' (o.g.); Wang Yinxin 80'	Report	6' Eksen; 20' Mirza'ekber; 71' Ekse; 6' Alkut	Stadium: Ürümqi Olympic Sports Center Stadium Outer Field; Attendance: 117

16 June 2024	Qinghai Xining Kunlun	1–1	Xinjiang Snowland Tiancheng	Ürümqi
21:00 UTC+8	Huang Kaizhou 72'	Report	28' Enwer	Stadium: Ürümqi Olympic Sports Center Stadium; Attendance: 145

18 June 2024	Xinjiang Dream Maker	0–0 (2–4 p)	Qinghai Xining Kunlun	Ürümqi
18:30 UTC+8		Report		Stadium: Ürümqi Olympic Sports Center Stadium; Attendance: 185

18 June 2024	Xinjiang Snowland Tiancheng	3–1	Ningxia Fangzhong	Ürümqi
18:30 UTC+8	Sherzat 38', 42'; Ekber 53'	Report	90+4' Wang Chenrui	Stadium: Ürümqi Olympic Sports Center Stadium Outer Field; Attendance: 36

==== Group M ====
Pos	Team	Pld	W	D	L	GF	GA	GD	Pts	Qualification
1	Xinjiang Silk Road Eagle (Q)	3	3	0	0	10	2	+8	9	Qualification for Qualifying round
2	Lanzhou Hailu (Q)	3	1	1	1	3	2	+1	4	Qualification for Qualifying round
3	Pingluo Hengli	3	1	0	2	4	7	−3	3	Qualification for Third-placed play-offs
4	Xi'an Hi-Tech Yilian	3	0	1	2	1	7	−6	1	Qualification for Fourth-placed play-offs

Updated to match(es) played on 18 June 2024. Source: Chinese Champions League
Rules for classification: 1) Points; 2) Head-to-head points; 3) Head-to-head goal difference; 4) Head-to-head goals scored; 5) If the tiebreaker concerns a qualification place, a penalty shoot-out may be arranged; 6) Goal difference; 7) Goals scored; 8) Disciplinary points (yellow card = 1 point, red card as a result of two yellow cards = 3 points, direct red card = 3 points, yellow card followed by direct red card = 4 points); 9) Drawing of lots.
(Q) Qualified for the phase indicated

14 June 2024	Xi'an Hi-Tech Yilian	0–0	Lanzhou Hailu	Ürümqi
18:30 UTC+8		Report		Stadium: Ürümqi Olympic Sports Center Stadium Outer Field; Attendance: 35

14 June 2024	Xinjiang Silk Road Eagle	4–1	Pingluo Hengli	Ürümqi
21:00 UTC+8	Ghulahat 5'; Rehmetulla 12'; Abdulam 21'; Mustahan 24'	Report	90+5' (pen.) Li Zhongyi	Stadium: Ürümqi Olympic Sports Center Stadium; Attendance: 1,087

16 June 2024	Pingluo Hengli	3–1	Xi'an Hi-Tech Yilian	Ürümqi
15:30 UTC+8	Wang Zhuo 53', 90+3'; Ding Kaile 68'	Report	13' Fang Linhan	Stadium: Ürümqi Olympic Sports Center Stadium Outer Field; Attendance: 57

16 June 2024	Lanzhou Hailu	1–2	Xinjiang Silk Road Eagle	Ürümqi
18:00 UTC+8	Li Weijie 83'	Report	73' Abdulla; 84' Abdulam	Stadium: Ürümqi Olympic Sports Center Stadium; Attendance: 1,368

18 June 2024	Xi'an Hi-Tech Yilian	0–4	Xinjiang Silk Road Eagle	Ürümqi
15:30 UTC+8		Report	20', 29' Dilmurat; 57' Ekremjan; 87' Sabahidin	Stadium: Ürümqi Olympic Sports Center Stadium; Attendance: 457

18 June 2024	Pingluo Hengli	0–2	Lanzhou Hailu	Ürümqi
15:30 UTC+8		Report	15', 34' Ren Yi	Stadium: Ürümqi Olympic Sports Center Stadium Outer Field; Attendance: 47

=== Weifang ===
==== Group N ====
Pos	Team	Pld	W	D	L	GF	GA	GD	Pts	Qualification
1	Hebei Xiong'an Glory (Q)	3	2	1	0	3	0	+3	7	Qualification for Qualifying round
2	Shandong Scout (Q)	3	2	0	1	4	2	+2	6	Qualification for Qualifying round
3	Shaanxi Shan'an	3	1	1	1	3	3	0	4	Qualification for Third-placed play-offs
4	Nantong New Dreams	3	0	0	3	3	8	−5	0	Qualification for Fourth-placed play-offs

Updated to match(es) played on 3 June 2024. Source: Chinese Champions League
Rules for classification: 1) Points; 2) Head-to-head points; 3) Head-to-head goal difference; 4) Head-to-head goals scored; 5) If the tiebreaker concerns a qualification place, a penalty shoot-out may be arranged; 6) Goal difference; 7) Goals scored; 8) Disciplinary points (yellow card = 1 point, red card as a result of two yellow cards = 3 points, direct red card = 3 points, yellow card followed by direct red card = 4 points); 9) Drawing of lots.
(Q) Qualified for the phase indicated

1 June 2024	Shandong Scout	3–1	Nantong New Dreams	Weifang
14:15 UTC+8	Jiao Mingyang 21', 38'; Zhang Xichi 46'	Report	53' Deng Zhiqiang	Stadium: Luneng Taishan Football School Field 1 Attendance: 46

1 June 2024	Hebei Xiong'an Glory	0–0	Shaanxi Shan'an	Weifang
16:30 UTC+8		Report		Stadium: Luneng Taishan Football School Field 1 Attendance: 52

3 June 2024	Nantong New Dreams	0–2	Hebei Xiong'an Glory	Weifang
14:15 UTC+8		Report	17' Wang Duolin; 51' Sun Fei	Stadium: Luneng Taishan Football School Field 1 Attendance: 37

3 June 2024	Shaanxi Shan'an	0–1	Shandong Scout	Weifang
16:30 UTC+8		Report	85' Wu Zhiyuan	Stadium: Luneng Taishan Football School Field 1 Attendance: 26

5 June 2024	Shandong Scout	0–1	Hebei Xiong'an Glory	Weifang
16:30 UTC+8		Report	78' Sun Fei	Stadium: Luneng Taishan Football School Field 1 Attendance: 48

5 June 2024	Shaanxi Shan'an	3–2	Nantong New Dreams	Weifang
16:30 UTC+8	Shang Zhijun 33'; Qin Tao 51'; Wang Zhongyu 57'	Report	67' Deng Zhiqiang; 81' Li Songmin	Stadium: Luneng Taishan Football School Field 2 Attendance: 21

==== Group O ====
Pos	Team	Pld	W	D	L	GF	GA	GD	Pts	Qualification
1	Zibo Home (Q)	3	3	0	0	6	0	+6	9	Qualification for Qualifying round
2	Shaanxi Northwest Youth (Q)	3	2	0	1	5	2	+3	6	Qualification for Qualifying round
3	Zibo Daqi	3	0	1	2	2	5	−3	1	Qualification for Third-placed play-offs
4	Shijiazhuang Kicker	3	0	1	2	2	8	−6	1	Qualification for Fourth-placed play-offs

Updated to match(es) played on 3 June 2024. Source: Chinese Champions League
Rules for classification: 1) Points; 2) Head-to-head points; 3) Head-to-head goal difference; 4) Head-to-head goals scored; 5) If the tiebreaker concerns a qualification place, a penalty shoot-out may be arranged; 6) Goal difference; 7) Goals scored; 8) Disciplinary points (yellow card = 1 point, red card as a result of two yellow cards = 3 points, direct red card = 3 points, yellow card followed by direct red card = 4 points); 9) Drawing of lots.
(Q) Qualified for the phase indicated

1 June 2024	Zibo Home	1–0	Zibo Daqi	Weifang
14:15 UTC+8	Cao Hanchen 35'	Report		Stadium: Luneng Taishan Football School Field 2 Attendance: 418

1 June 2024	Shaanxi Northwest Youth	3–0	Shijiazhuang Kicker	Weifang
16:30 UTC+8	Sun Rui 56'; Irfan 56'; Chen Xingliang 85'	Report		Stadium: Luneng Taishan Football School Field 2 Attendance: 56

3 June 2024	Shijiazhuang Kicker	0–3	Zibo Home	Weifang
14:15 UTC+8		Report	3', 31' Tan Tiancheng; 88' (pen.) Ma Tianming	Stadium: Luneng Taishan Football School Field 2 Attendance: 43

3 June 2024	Zibo Daqi	0–2	Shaanxi Northwest Youth	Weifang
16:30 UTC+8		Report	36' Huang Jianjian; 45' Gao Shuaishuai	Stadium: Luneng Taishan Football School Field 2 Attendance: 35

5 June 2024	Shijiazhuang Kicker	2–2	Zibo Daqi	Weifang
14:15 UTC+8	Li Yangshuo 8'; Wang Shiwei 12'	Report	77', 90+6' Si Xiao	Stadium: Luneng Taishan Football School Field 1 Attendance: 22

5 June 2024	Shaanxi Northwest Youth	0–2	Zibo Home	Weifang
14:15 UTC+8		Report	52' Ma Long; 75' Tan Tiancheng	Stadium: Luneng Taishan Football School Field 2 Attendance: 30

=== Rizhao ===
==== Group P ====
Pos	Team	Pld	W	D	L	GF	GA	GD	Pts	Qualification
1	Shanxi TYUT Yida (Q)	3	2	0	1	9	6	+3	6	Qualification for Qualifying round
2	Shanghai Second (Q)	3	1	1	1	3	4	−1	4	Qualification for Qualifying round
3	Nanjing Tehu	3	1	1	1	3	4	−1	4	Qualification for Third-placed play-offs
4	Qingdao May Wind	3	0	2	1	2	3	−1	2	Qualification for Fourth-placed play-offs

Updated to match(es) played on 22 May 2024. Source: Chinese Champions League
Rules for classification: 1) Points; 2) Head-to-head points; 3) Head-to-head goal difference; 4) Head-to-head goals scored; 5) If the tiebreaker concerns a qualification place, a penalty shoot-out may be arranged; 6) Goal difference; 7) Goals scored; 8) Disciplinary points (yellow card = 1 point, red card as a result of two yellow cards = 3 points, direct red card = 3 points, yellow card followed by direct red card = 4 points); 9) Drawing of lots.
(Q) Qualified for the phase indicated

18 May 2024	Qingdao May Wind	0–0	Shanghai Second	Rizhao
13:30 UTC+8		Report		Stadium: Rizhao International Football Center; Attendance: 67

18 May 2024	Shanxi TYUT Yida	2–3	Nanjing Tehu	Rizhao
16:30 UTC+8	Li Yujia 54'; Li Haozhou 76'	Report	32', 70' Zhu Lei; 64' Dong Kaining	Stadium: Rizhao International Football Center; Attendance: 146

20 May 2024	Shanghai Second	1–4	Shanxi TYUT Yida	Rizhao
13:30 UTC+8	Zhang Lu 50'	Report	11', 55' Li Zewei; 25' Zhang Ruifeng; 90' (pen.) Li Yujia	Stadium: Rizhao International Football Center; Attendance: 37

20 May 2024	Nanjing Tehu	0–0	Qingdao May Wind	Rizhao
16:30 UTC+8		Report		Stadium: Rizhao International Football Center; Attendance: 62

22 May 2024	Qingdao May Wind	2–3	Shanxi TYUT Yida	Rizhao
16:30 UTC+8	Liu Xiaofeng 48'; Lu Yi 67'	Report	33', 86' Li Yujia; 90+6' (pen.) Li Zewen	Stadium: Rizhao International Football Center; Attendance: 32

22 May 2024	Nanjing Tehu	0–2	Shanghai Second	Rizhao
16:30 UTC+8		Report	62', 64' Zhang Yi	Stadium: Rizhao International Football Center Training Base Field 1 Attendance: 72

==== Group Q ====
Pos	Team	Pld	W	D	L	GF	GA	GD	Pts	Qualification
1	Jiangsu Landhouse Dong Victory (Q)	3	3	0	0	9	1	+8	9	Qualification for Qualifying round
2	Shanghai MHI KLions (Q)	3	2	0	1	12	3	+9	6	Qualification for Qualifying round
3	Qingdao Quickboy	3	1	0	2	6	6	0	3	Qualification for Third-placed play-offs
4	Wuhan Juxing Shanyao	3	0	0	3	2	19	−17	0	Qualification for Fourth-placed play-offs

Updated to match(es) played on 22 May 2024. Source: Chinese Champions League
Rules for classification: 1) Points; 2) Head-to-head points; 3) Head-to-head goal difference; 4) Head-to-head goals scored; 5) If the tiebreaker concerns a qualification place, a penalty shoot-out may be arranged; 6) Goal difference; 7) Goals scored; 8) Disciplinary points (yellow card = 1 point, red card as a result of two yellow cards = 3 points, direct red card = 3 points, yellow card followed by direct red card = 4 points); 9) Drawing of lots.
(Q) Qualified for the phase indicated

18 May 2024	Jiangsu Landhouse Dong Victory	2–1	Shanghai MHI KLions	Rizhao
13:30 UTC+8	Yang Lei 5'; Tang Miao 85'	Report	12' Xu Qi	Stadium: Rizhao International Football Center Training Base Field 1 Attendance: 63

18 May 2024	Wuhan Juxing Shanyao	2–5	Qingdao Quickboy	Rizhao
16:30 UTC+8	Liang Hongchao 67'; Li Kai 75'	Report	13' Dai Kewei; 26' Wang Junhao; 45+2', 90+5' Yang Wenfeng; 90+4' Shang Chao	Stadium: Rizhao International Football Center Training Base Field 1 Attendance: 55

20 May 2024	Shanghai MHI KLions	9–0	Wuhan Juxing Shanyao	Rizhao
13:30 UTC+8	Wang Jun 40', 45+3'; Chen Xinze 45+1' (o.g.); Li Haowen 48', 55'; Guan Jiawei 64'; Ji Haoxiang 69'; Liang Hongchao 85' (o.g.); Xu Qi 90+1'	Report		Stadium: Rizhao International Football Center Training Base Field 1 Attendance: 21

20 May 2024	Qingdao Quickboy	0–2	Jiangsu Landhouse Dong Victory	Rizhao
16:30 UTC+8		Report	22' Li Shizhou; 49' Ma Jun	Stadium: Rizhao International Football Center Training Base Field 1 Attendance: 58

22 May 2024	Jiangsu Landhouse Dong Victory	5–0	Wuhan Juxing Shanyao	Rizhao
16:30 UTC+8	Hu Yubo 41'; Pan Chi 56', 69'; Li Guangge 63', 82'	Report		Stadium: Rizhao International Football Center; Attendance: 35

22 May 2024	Qingdao Quickboy	1–2	Shanghai MHI KLions	Rizhao
16:30 UTC+8	Liu Xianda 60'	Report	38' (pen.) Li Haowen; 82' Zheng Zelong	Stadium: Rizhao International Football Center Training Base Field 1 Attendance: 48

=== Yingkou ===
==== Group R ====
Pos	Team	Pld	W	D	L	GF	GA	GD	Pts	Qualification
1	Yantai Ruixiang (Q)	3	2	1	0	6	3	+3	7	Qualification for Qualifying round
2	Yingkou Chaoyue (Q)	3	2	0	1	5	1	+4	6	Qualification for Qualifying round
3	Yanbian Sports School	2	1	0	1	5	7	−2	3	Qualification for Third-placed play-offs
4	Shanxi Xiangyu	3	0	0	3	2	7	−5	0	Qualification for Fourth-placed play-offs

Updated to match(es) played on 6 July 2024. Source: Chinese Champions League
Rules for classification: 1) Points; 2) Head-to-head points; 3) Head-to-head goal difference; 4) Head-to-head goals scored; 5) If the tiebreaker concerns a qualification place, a penalty shoot-out may be arranged; 6) Goal difference; 7) Goals scored; 8) Disciplinary points (yellow card = 1 point, red card as a result of two yellow cards = 3 points, direct red card = 3 points, yellow card followed by direct red card = 4 points); 9) Drawing of lots.
(Q) Qualified for the phase indicated

2 July 2024	Yanbian Sports School	3–1	Shanxi Xiangyu	Panjin
16:00 UTC+8	Zong Xuanyu 53'; Qi Yuyang 56'; Zheng Zhehao 83'	Report	64' Ilyar	Stadium: Red Beach Sports Center Stadium; Attendance: 35

2 July 2024	Yingkou Chaoyue	0–1	Yantai Ruixiang	Panjin
19:00 UTC+8		Report	11' Wang Zihao	Stadium: Red Beach Sports Center Stadium; Attendance: 652

4 July 2024	Yantai Ruixiang	2–2	Yanbian Sports School	Panjin
16:00 UTC+8	Yao Guanyu 63'; Memet-Rasat 63'	Report	7' Jin Xing; 51' (pen.) Jin Chengjun	Stadium: Red Beach Sports Center Stadium; Attendance: 56

4 July 2024	Shanxi Xiangyu	0–1	Yingkou Chaoyue	Panjin
19:00 UTC+8		Report	51' Yang Feng	Stadium: Red Beach Sports Center Stadium; Attendance: 368

6 July 2024	Yingkou Chaoyue	4–0	Yanbian Sports School	Panjin
13:30 UTC+8	Jiang Tao 5'; Yang Feng 69'; Yang Long 74'; Guan Hao 89'	Report		Stadium: Red Beach Sports Center Stadium; Attendance: 407

6 July 2024	Shanxi Xiangyu	1–3	Yantai Ruixiang	Panjin
13:30 UTC+8	Ehmetjan 90+1'	Report	42' Memet-Rasat; 58' Cui Zijun; 82' Akzhol	Stadium: Red Beach Sports Center Stadium Outer Field; Attendance: 9

==== Group S ====
Pos	Team	Pld	W	D	L	GF	GA	GD	Pts	Qualification
1	Changchun Xidu (Q)	3	3	0	0	7	1	+6	9	Qualification for Qualifying round
2	Shanxi Longchengren (Q)	3	2	0	1	12	3	+9	6	Qualification for Qualifying round
3	Heze Caozhou	3	1	0	2	3	5	−2	3	Qualification for Third-placed play-offs
4	Handan People	3	0	0	3	1	14	−13	0	Qualification for Fourth-placed play-offs

Updated to match(es) played on 6 July 2024. Source: Chinese Champions League
Rules for classification: 1) Points; 2) Head-to-head points; 3) Head-to-head goal difference; 4) Head-to-head goals scored; 5) If the tiebreaker concerns a qualification place, a penalty shoot-out may be arranged; 6) Goal difference; 7) Goals scored; 8) Disciplinary points (yellow card = 1 point, red card as a result of two yellow cards = 3 points, direct red card = 3 points, yellow card followed by direct red card = 4 points); 9) Drawing of lots.
(Q) Qualified for the phase indicated

2 July 2024	Shanxi Longchengren	1–2	Changchun Xidu	Panjin
13:30 UTC+8	Zhang Yang 76'	Report	5' Zhao Ran; 45+3' Wang Tong	Stadium: Red Beach Sports Center Stadium Outer Field; Attendance: 26

2 July 2024	Heze Caozhou	2–1	Handan People	Panjin
16:30 UTC+8	Luo Houzhen 38'; Zhang Haochen 63'	Report	69' Yue Shihui	Stadium: Red Beach Sports Center Stadium Outer Field; Attendance: 6

4 July 2024	Changchun Xidu	2–0	Heze Caozhou	Panjin
13:30 UTC+8	Aysan 13'; Nuryasin 85'	Report		Stadium: Red Beach Sports Center Stadium Outer Field; Attendance: 22

4 July 2024	Handan People	0–9	Shanxi Longchengren	Panjin
16:30 UTC+8		Report	11', 28', 39', 55' Ma Dongliang; 36' Wu Zhuangfei; 54' Yang Chengyu; 58' Chen Tang; 69' Ye Runbiao; 75' Ju Feng	Stadium: Red Beach Sports Center Stadium; Attendance: 21

6 July 2024	Shanxi Longchengren	2–1	Heze Caozhou	Panjin
16:30 UTC+8	Zhou Shun 10'; Ma Dongliang 40'	Report	12' Hu Shikang	Stadium: Red Beach Sports Center Stadium; Attendance: 87

6 July 2024	Handan People	0–3	Changchun Xidu	Panjin
16:30 UTC+8		Report	25' Jiang Chenghao; 37' Abdumejit; 49' Radil	Stadium: Red Beach Sports Center Stadium Outer Field; Attendance: 8

=== Qualifying round ===
==== Qujing ====
Pos	Team	Pld	W	D	L	GF	GA	GD	Pts	Qualification
1	Qianxinan Xufengtang (Q)	3	2	1	0	7	2	+5	7	Qualification for Final round
2	Qujing EB (Q)	3	2	0	1	7	5	+2	6	Qualification for Final round
3	Kunming City	3	1	1	1	10	5	+5	4	
4	Swatow Abstract	3	0	0	3	1	12	−11	0	

Updated to match(es) played on 5 July 2024. Source:
Rules for classification: 1) Points; 2) Head-to-head points; 3) Head-to-head goal difference; 4) Head-to-head goals scored; 5) If the tiebreaker concerns a qualification place, a penalty shoot-out may be arranged; 6) Goal difference; 7) Goals scored; 8) Disciplinary points (yellow card = 1 point, red card as a result of two yellow cards = 3 points, direct red card = 3 points, yellow card followed by direct red card = 4 points); 9) Drawing of lots.
(Q) Qualified for the phase indicated

3 July 2024	Qianxinan Xufengtang	2–0	Swatow Abstract	Qujing
16:30 UTC+8	Chen Huifeng 25'; Nurmemet 85'	Report		Stadium: Qujing Cultural and Sports Park Stadium; Attendance: 325

3 July 2024	Qujing EB	3–2	Kunming City	Qujing
19:30 UTC+8	Zhao Yihao 16'; Li Dongxian 47'; Tan Zhenyu 88'	Report	65' (pen.) Chen Junzhou; 90+5' Zhang Xu	Stadium: Qujing Cultural and Sports Park Stadium; Attendance: 826

5 July 2024	Swatow Abstract	1–7	Kunming City	Qujing
17:00 UTC+8	Ni Shengjie 54'	Report	20', 46', 66' Zhang Xu; 23' Gong Zijie; 31' (pen.), 66' (pen.) Chen Junzhou; 59' Yu Zichun	Stadium: Yibu Football Park; Attendance: 76

5 July 2024	Qujing EB	1–3	Qianxinan Xufengtang	Qujing
17:00 UTC+8	He Zhixing 4'	Report	16', 17' Wei Jingxing; 77' Song Hanchuan	Stadium: Qujing Cultural and Sports Park Stadium; Attendance: 728

==== Guigang ====
Pos	Team	Pld	W	D	L	GF	GA	GD	Pts	Qualification
1	Guizhou Zhucheng Athletic (Q)	3	2	1	0	4	2	+2	7	Qualification for Final round
2	Guangdong Mingtu (Q)	3	1	1	1	5	4	+1	4	Qualification for Final round
3	Guangdong Red Treasure	3	1	1	1	7	8	−1	4	
4	Guangxi Bushan	3	0	1	2	5	7	−2	1	

Updated to match(es) played on 26 May 2024. Source:
Rules for classification: 1) Points; 2) Head-to-head points; 3) Head-to-head goal difference; 4) Head-to-head goals scored; 5) If the tiebreaker concerns a qualification place, a penalty shoot-out may be arranged; 6) Goal difference; 7) Goals scored; 8) Disciplinary points (yellow card = 1 point, red card as a result of two yellow cards = 3 points, direct red card = 3 points, yellow card followed by direct red card = 4 points); 9) Drawing of lots.
(Q) Qualified for the phase indicated

24 May 2024	Guangdong Red Treasure	1–3	Guangdong Mingtu	Guigang
16:30 UTC+8	Wu Zhirong 36'	Report	11' Zhu Xinyu; 70' Yao Haoyun; 84' Wei Xiangxin	Stadium: Jiuling Lake Football Training Centre Field 1 Attendance: 26

24 May 2024	Guangxi Bushan	0–1	Guizhou Zhucheng Athletic	Guigang
19:30 UTC+8		Report	90' (o.g.) Ghulaht	Stadium: Guigang Sports Centre Stadium; Attendance: 21,448

26 May 2024	Guangdong Mingtu	2–3	Guizhou Zhucheng Athletic	Guigang
19:30 UTC+8	Yin Bowen 68'; Yao Haoyun 90+2'	Report	7' Li Chunsheng; 21' Wang Xiao; 45+2' Xian Yangjiazhu	Stadium: Jiuling Lake Football Training Centre Field 1 Attendance: 65

26 May 2024	Guangxi Bushan	5–6	Guangdong Red Treasure	Guigang
19:30 UTC+8	Chagtsel 37'; Sun Mingxiang 42'; Li Yuqiu 65', 83'; Cao Zhenquan 73'	Report	10', 20', 90+1' Kong Yinquan; 24' Wu Zhirong; 69' Eyyidin; 90+3' Li Zhenyu	Stadium: Guigang Sports Centre Stadium; Attendance: 14,863

==== Zhangzhou ====
Pos	Team	Pld	W	D	L	GF	GA	GD	Pts	Qualification
1	Xiamen 1026 (Q)	3	2	0	1	6	1	+5	6	Qualification for Final round
2	Shenzhen 2028 (Q)	3	2	0	1	5	3	+2	6	Qualification for Final round
3	Xiamen Lujiantiancheng	3	1	1	1	3	5	−2	4	
4	Ningbo Daxie Jindao	3	0	1	2	3	8	−5	1	

Updated to match(es) played on 11 June 2024. Source:
Rules for classification: 1) Points; 2) Head-to-head points; 3) Head-to-head goal difference; 4) Head-to-head goals scored; 5) If the tiebreaker concerns a qualification place, a penalty shoot-out may be arranged; 6) Goal difference; 7) Goals scored; 8) Disciplinary points (yellow card = 1 point, red card as a result of two yellow cards = 3 points, direct red card = 3 points, yellow card followed by direct red card = 4 points); 9) Drawing of lots.
(Q) Qualified for the phase indicated

9 June 2024	Shenzhen 2028	2–1	Ningbo Daxie Jindao	Zhangpu
14:00 UTC+8	Wang Zhiyuan 31'; Li Lehang 84'	Report	22' Wang Xin	Stadium: HOORAY International Football Training Base Field A5; Attendance: 227

9 June 2024	Xiamen 1026	0–1	Xiamen Lujiantiancheng	Zhangpu
16:15 UTC+8		Report	22' Liu Yao	Stadium: HOORAY International Football Training Base Field A1; Attendance: 580

11 June 2024	Shenzhen 2028	0–2	Xiamen 1026	Zhangpu
15:00 UTC+8		Report	28' Geng Xianglong; 69' (o.g.) Chen Ziwen	Stadium: HOORAY International Football Training Base Field A1; Attendance: 781

11 June 2024	Xiamen Lujiantiancheng	2–2	Ningbo Daxie Jindao	Zhangpu
15:00 UTC+8	Liu Yao 16'; Li Guo 52'	Report	19' Han Wenbiao; 24' Feng Zeyuan	Stadium: HOORAY International Football Training Base Field A5; Attendance: 256

==== Wuhan ====
Pos	Team	Pld	W	D	L	GF	GA	GD	Pts	Qualification
1	Guangzhou Alpha (Q)	3	1	2	0	3	0	+3	5	Qualification for Final round
2	Wuhan Lianzhen (Q)	3	1	2	0	3	2	+1	5	Qualification for Final round
3	Shenzhen Jixiang	3	1	1	1	3	1	+2	4	
4	Quanzhou Qinggong	3	0	1	2	2	8	−6	1	

Updated to match(es) played on 22 June 2024. Source:
Rules for classification: 1) Points; 2) Head-to-head points; 3) Head-to-head goal difference; 4) Head-to-head goals scored; 5) If the tiebreaker concerns a qualification place, a penalty shoot-out may be arranged; 6) Goal difference; 7) Goals scored; 8) Disciplinary points (yellow card = 1 point, red card as a result of two yellow cards = 3 points, direct red card = 3 points, yellow card followed by direct red card = 4 points); 9) Drawing of lots.
(Q) Qualified for the phase indicated

20 June 2024	Wuhan Lianzhen	2–2	Quanzhou Qinggong	Wuhan
19:30 UTC+8	Fan Xiaobin 74'; Zhang Gen 81'	Report	71', 90+2' Liang Huan	Stadium: Tazi Lake Sports Centre Field 3 Attendance: 134

20 June 2024	Guangzhou Alpha	0–0	Shenzhen Jixiang	Wuhan
19:30 UTC+8		Report		Stadium: Tazi Lake Sports Centre Field 2 Attendance: 127

22 June 2024	Wuhan Lianzhen	0–0	Guangzhou Alpha	Wuhan
16:30 UTC+8		Report		Stadium: Tazi Lake Sports Centre Field 3 Attendance: 142

22 June 2024	Shenzhen Jixiang	3–0	Quanzhou Qinggong	Wuhan
16:30 UTC+8	Abliz 16'; Liu Guoqiang 19', 45+1'	Report		Stadium: Tazi Lake Sports Centre Field 2 Attendance: 89

==== Ürümqi ====
Pos	Team	Pld	W	D	L	GF	GA	GD	Pts	Qualification
1	Xinjiang Snowland Tiancheng (Q)	3	1	2	0	5	2	+3	5	Qualification for Final round
2	Qinghai Xining Kunlun (Q)	3	1	2	0	2	1	+1	5	Qualification for Final round
3	Xinjiang Silk Road Eagle	3	1	2	0	3	2	+1	5	
4	Lanzhou Hailu	3	0	0	3	1	6	−5	0	

Updated to match(es) played on 23 June 2024. Source:
Rules for classification: 1) Points; 2) Head-to-head points; 3) Head-to-head goal difference; 4) Head-to-head goals scored; 5) If the tiebreaker concerns a qualification place, a penalty shoot-out may be arranged; 6) Goal difference; 7) Goals scored; 8) Disciplinary points (yellow card = 1 point, red card as a result of two yellow cards = 3 points, direct red card = 3 points, yellow card followed by direct red card = 4 points); 9) Drawing of lots.
(Q) Qualified for the phase indicated

21 June 2024	Qinghai Xining Kunlun	1–0	Lanzhou Hailu	Ürümqi
18:00 UTC+8	Lu Chaoyu 60'	Report		Stadium: Ürümqi Olympic Sports Center Stadium; Attendance: 0

21 June 2024	Xinjiang Silk Road Eagle	1–1	Xinjiang Snowland Tiancheng	Ürümqi
21:00 UTC+8	Erdos 90+1'	Report	89' Muhamet	Stadium: Ürümqi Olympic Sports Center Stadium; Attendance: 621

23 June 2024	Xinjiang Snowland Tiancheng	3–1	Lanzhou Hailu	Ürümqi
18:00 UTC+8	Ekber 21', 56'; Enwer 27'	Report	65' Xian Haoyang	Stadium: Ürümqi Olympic Sports Center Stadium Outer Field; Attendance: 26

23 June 2024	Xinjiang Silk Road Eagle	0–0 (4–5 p)	Qinghai Xining Kunlun	Ürümqi
18:00 UTC+8		Report		Stadium: Ürümqi Olympic Sports Center Stadium; Attendance: 616

==== Weifang ====
Pos	Team	Pld	W	D	L	GF	GA	GD	Pts	Qualification
1	Zibo Home (Q)	3	3	0	0	6	1	+5	9	Qualification for Final round
2	Shaanxi Northwest Youth (Q)	3	2	0	1	3	2	+1	6	Qualification for Final round
3	Hebei Xiong'an Glory	3	1	0	2	2	3	−1	3	
4	Shandong Scout	3	0	0	3	0	5	−5	0	

Updated to match(es) played on 10 June 2024. Source:
Rules for classification: 1) Points; 2) Head-to-head points; 3) Head-to-head goal difference; 4) Head-to-head goals scored; 5) If the tiebreaker concerns a qualification place, a penalty shoot-out may be arranged; 6) Goal difference; 7) Goals scored; 8) Disciplinary points (yellow card = 1 point, red card as a result of two yellow cards = 3 points, direct red card = 3 points, yellow card followed by direct red card = 4 points); 9) Drawing of lots.
(Q) Qualified for the phase indicated

8 June 2024	Hebei Xiong'an Glory	0–1	Shaanxi Northwest Youth	Weifang
16:30 UTC+8		Report	7' (pen.) Irfan	Stadium: Luneng Taishan Football School Field 1 Attendance: 42

8 June 2024	Zibo Home	2–0	Shandong Scout	Weifang
16:30 UTC+8	Zhang Cheng 45'; Lü Weicheng 57'	Report		Stadium: Luneng Taishan Football School Field 2 Attendance: 175

10 June 2024	Shandong Scout	0–2	Shaanxi Northwest Youth	Weifang
16:00 UTC+8		Report	18' Chen Xingliang; 60' Sun Rui	Stadium: Luneng Taishan Football School Field 1 Attendance: 38

10 June 2024	Zibo Home	2–1	Hebei Xiong'an Glory	Weifang
16:00 UTC+8	Piao Lei 22'; Cao Hanchen 65'	Report	86' Cui Yuchao	Stadium: Luneng Taishan Football School Field 2 Attendance: 122

==== Rizhao ====
Pos	Team	Pld	W	D	L	GF	GA	GD	Pts	Qualification
1	Jiangsu Landhouse Dong Victory (Q)	3	3	0	0	6	2	+4	9	Qualification for Final round
2	Shanxi TYUT Yida (Q)	3	1	1	1	6	4	+2	4	Qualification for Final round
3	Shanghai MHI KLions	3	1	1	1	6	4	+2	4	
4	Shanghai Second	3	0	0	3	2	10	−8	0	

Updated to match(es) played on 27 May 2024. Source:
Rules for classification: 1) Points; 2) Head-to-head points; 3) Head-to-head goal difference; 4) Head-to-head goals scored; 5) If the tiebreaker concerns a qualification place, a penalty shoot-out may be arranged; 6) Goal difference; 7) Goals scored; 8) Disciplinary points (yellow card = 1 point, red card as a result of two yellow cards = 3 points, direct red card = 3 points, yellow card followed by direct red card = 4 points); 9) Drawing of lots.
(Q) Qualified for the phase indicated

25 May 2024	Shanghai MHI KLions	3–0	Shanghai Second	Rizhao
13:30 UTC+8	Ji Haoxiang 21'; Wang Jun 72'; Li Haowen 90' (pen.)	Report		Stadium: Rizhao International Football Center; Attendance: 48

25 May 2024	Jiangsu Landhouse Dong Victory	1–0	Shanxi TYUT Yida	Rizhao
16:30 UTC+8	Qu Cheng 83'	Report		Stadium: Rizhao International Football Center; Attendance: 107

27 May 2024	Shanghai Second	1–3	Jiangsu Landhouse Dong Victory	Rizhao
13:30 UTC+8	Xu Yongle 76'		Wu Dingmao 20'; Lin Kaiyuan 25' (o.g.); Chen Shu 56'	Stadium: Rizhao International Football Center Training Base Field 1 Attendance: 47

27 May 2024	Shanxi TYUT Yida	2–2 (3–2 p)	Shanghai MHI KLions	Rizhao
16:30 UTC+8	Li Zewen 73'; Huang Jiaran 75'		27' Xu Ning; 82' Shen Jiahao	Stadium: Rizhao International Football Center Training Base Field 1 Attendance: 73
	Penalties
	Li Zewen (penalty scored); Li Shengchao (penalty scored); Liu Kunyang (penalty missed); Zhang Ruifeng (penalty scored)		Wu Haitian (penalty scored); Pan Hao (penalty missed); Mu Jiaxin (penalty missed); He Kanghao (penalty scored); Lu Haolin (penalty missed)

==== Yingkou ====
Pos	Team	Pld	W	D	L	GF	GA	GD	Pts	Qualification
1	Changchun Xidu (Q)	3	3	0	0	7	1	+6	9	Qualification for Final round
2	Shanxi Longchengren (Q)	3	2	0	1	8	2	+6	6	Qualification for Final round
3	Yantai Ruixiang	3	1	0	2	1	5	−4	3	
4	Yingkou Chaoyue	3	0	0	3	0	8	−8	0	

Updated to match(es) played on 11 July 2024. Source:
Rules for classification: 1) Points; 2) Head-to-head points; 3) Head-to-head goal difference; 4) Head-to-head goals scored; 5) If the tiebreaker concerns a qualification place, a penalty shoot-out may be arranged; 6) Goal difference; 7) Goals scored; 8) Disciplinary points (yellow card = 1 point, red card as a result of two yellow cards = 3 points, direct red card = 3 points, yellow card followed by direct red card = 4 points); 9) Drawing of lots.
(Q) Qualified for the phase indicated

9 July 2024	Changchun Xidu	2–0	Yantai Ruixiang	Panjin
16:00 UTC+8	Nuryasin 6'; Alper 90+6'	Report		Stadium: Red Beach Sports Center Stadium; Attendance: 86

9 July 2024	Yingkou Chaoyue	0–4	Shanxi Longchengren	Panjin
19:00 UTC+8		Report	19' Yu Shuai; 26' Yang Chengyu; 45+2' Li Shanglin; 51' Ye Runbiao	Stadium: Red Beach Sports Center Stadium; Attendance: 311

11 July 2024	Changchun Xidu	3–0	Yingkou Chaoyue	Panjin
13:30 UTC+8	Wang Tong 40'; Mei Jingxuan 59'; Nuryasin 78'	Report		Stadium: Red Beach Sports Center Stadium; Attendance: 68

11 July 2024	Shanxi Longchengren	3–0	Yantai Ruixiang	Panjin
16:30 UTC+8	Ma Dongliang 4', 16'; Ju Feng 24'; Nuryasin 78'	Report		Stadium: Red Beach Sports Center Stadium Outer Field; Attendance: 22

=== Third-placed play-offs ===
23 May 2024	Guangxi Zuxingtianxia	8–1	Qiandongnan Miaoling	Guigang
16:30 UTC+8	Yan Bowen 7'; Li Shujiang 27' (o.g.); Xian Haihui 44', 45+3'; Imran 63', 80', 87'; Li Wenheng 68'	Report	65' Wen Gaoming	Stadium: Jiuling Lake Football Training Centre Field 1 Attendance: 25

24 May 2024	Nanjing Tehu	3–0	Qingdao Quickboy	Rizhao
13:30 UTC+8	Yang Rui 47', 77'; Lü Ming 88'	Report		Stadium: Rizhao International Football Center Training Base Field 1 Attendance: 28

7 June 2024	Shaanxi Shan'an	2–0	Zibo Daqi	Weifang
16:30 UTC+8	Qin Tao 61', 62'	Report		Stadium: Luneng Taishan Football School Field 2 Attendance: 12

8 June 2024	Shenzhen Nanshan Shengqing	2–4	Hunan Tianyueyong	Zhangpu
13:30 UTC+8	Gu Weikang 36', 80'		17' Qin Weikang; 75' Zhang Tao; 86' Xiong Yukai; 90+3' Zhou Yang	Stadium: HOORAY International Football Training Base Field A2; Attendance: 0

19 June 2024	Changle Jingangtui	1–5	Chongqing Chunlei	Wuhan
16:30 UTC+8	Zuo Shixi 42'	Report	35', 54' Zhang Haitao; 45', 90' Imranjan; 47' Wen Tianpeng	Stadium: Tazi Lake Sports Centre Field 3 Attendance: 34

20 June 2024	Xinjiang Dream Maker	3–2	Pingluo Hengli	Ürümqi
21:00 UTC+8	Ekse 10', 15', 38'		55' Li Zhongting; 55' Li Bowen	Stadium: Ürümqi Olympic Sports Center Stadium; Attendance: 62

2 July 2024	Chongqing Rich	0–3; Awarded	Chongqing Benbiao	Qujing
		Report

8 July 2024	Yanbian Sports School	2–3	Heze Caozhou	Panjin
13:30 UTC+8	Liu Chenglong 60'; Zong Xuanyu 80'	Report	2', 70' Jiang Haojun; 15' Hu Hongtao	Stadium: Red Beach Sports Center Stadium Outer Field; Attendance: 2

=== Fourth-placed play-offs ===
23 May 2024	Hainan Shuangyu	0–5	Hainan Zhonghong	Guigang
19:30 UTC+8		Report	31', 43' Zhu Qicheng; 59' Li Xuecheng; 86' Li Boming; 90' Hu Boran	Stadium: Jiuling Lake Football Training Centre Field 1 Attendance: 42

24 May 2024	Wuhan Juxing Shanyao	1–5	Qingdao May Wind	Rizhao
16:30 UTC+8	Li Zhiqi 90+1'	Report	28' Lu Yi; 32' Zhang Huanan; 36' Liu Xiaofeng; 44' Ning Dating; 69' Ji Qinshang	Stadium: Rizhao International Football Center Training Base Field 1 Attendance: 27

7 June 2024	Shijiazhuang Kicker	2–5	Nantong New Dreams	Weifang
16:30 UTC+8	Zhao Ziyi 49'; Chen Tao 59'	Report	6', 21', 47' Luo Jingyu; 41' Li Zhuoran; 78' Deng Zhiqiang	Stadium: Luneng Taishan Football School Field 1 Attendance: 25

8 June 2024	Shanghai Tongji	1–1 (4–1 p)	Shanghai Luckystar	Zhangpu
16:00 UTC+8	Pan Junjie 90'		90+2' Li Tianhao	Stadium: HOORAY International Football Training Base Field A2; Attendance: 196
	Penalties
	Zhao Yuan (penalty scored); Ma Qiteng (penalty scored); Yin Hui (penalty scored); He Luxin (penalty scored)		Yue Bowen (penalty missed); Zhao Ruifeng (penalty scored); Li Tianhao (penalty missed)

19 June 2024	Wuhan Xiaoma	1–2	Chongqing Handa	Wuhan
19:30 UTC+8	Wu Tianlong 90+2'	Report	55' Lu Xianyong; 90+7' Li Jianhua	Stadium: Tazi Lake Sports Centre Field 2 Attendance: 36

20 June 2024	Xi'an Hi-Tech Yilian	2–1	Ningxia Fangzhong	Ürümqi
18:00 UTC+8	Wen Kejie 61'; Yan Kai 71'		77' Wang Zehua	Stadium: Ürümqi Olympic Sports Center Stadium; Attendance: 36

2 July 2024	Guangxi Yong City	0–8	Guizhou OU	Qujing
17:00 UTC+8		Report	25' Song Daize; 28', 74' Luo Jiangtao; 42' Ding Kaiming; 60' Xie Ruiqi; 72' Tian Chuangchuang; 82' Wang Xiangbing; 83' Wu Bohang	Stadium: Yibu Football Park; Attendance: 86

8 July 2024	Handan People	3–2	Shanxi Xiangyu	Panjin
16:30 UTC+8	Yang Kaideng 60', 74'; Yue Shihui 68'	Report	11' Yan Hao; 52' Ehmetjan	Stadium: Red Beach Sports Center Stadium Outer Field; Attendance: 15

== Final round ==
=== Stadiums and locations ===
Locations of the 2024 Chinese Champions League final round teams

Team	Head coach	Location	Stadium	Capacity	Regional Tournament
Qianxinan Xufengtang	(Spain) Sergio Castro Boyano	Xingyi			1st (Qujing)
Qujing EB	(China) He Yunqun	Qujing			2nd (Qujing)
Guizhou Zhucheng Athletic	(China) Zhu Jiong	Guiyang			1st (Guigang)
Guangdong Mingtu	(China) Guo Yijun	Guangzhou			2nd (Guigang)
Xiamen 1026	(China) Huang Shibo	Xiamen			1st (Zhangzhou)
Shenzhen 2028	(China) Wang Dong	Shenzhen			2nd (Zhangzhou)
Guangzhou Alpha	(China) Tan Ende	Guangzhou			1st (Wuhan)
Wuhan Lianzhen	(China) Zhou Hang	Wuhan			2nd (Wuhan)
Xinjiang Snowland Tiancheng	(China) Polat Kutulk	Ürümqi			1st (Ürümqi)
Qinghai Xining Kunlun	(China) Feng Jie	Xining			2nd (Ürümqi)
Zibo Home	(China) Wang Shuo	Zibo			1st (Weifang)
Shaanxi Northwest Youth	(China) Zhang Yong	Xi'an			2nd (Weifang)
Jiangsu Landhouse Dong Victory	(China) Lu Feng	Nanjing			1st (Rizhao)
Shanxi TYUT Yida	(China) Wu Jianwen	Taiyuan			2nd (Rizhao)
Changchun Xidu	(China) Li Bin	Changchun			1st (Yingkou)
Shanxi Longchengren	(China) Cao Tianbao	Taiyuan			2nd (Yingkou)

=== Seeding ===
16 qualified teams were seeded according to their performance in the first stage. The draw was held on 16 July 2024.

Pot 1	Pot 2	Pot 3	Pot 4	Pot 5	Pot 6	Pot 7	Pot 8
Jiangsu Landhouse Dong Victory; Changchun Xidu	Zibo Home; Qianxinan Xufengtang	Guizhou Zhucheng Athletic; Shanxi Longchengren	Shenzhen 2028; Qujing EB	Shaanxi Northwest Youth; Wuhan Lianzhen	Guangdong Mingtu; Xiamen 1026	Guangzhou Alpha; Qinghai Xining Kunlun	Xinjiang Snowland Tiancheng; Shanxi TYUT Yida

=== Group A ===
Pos	Team	Pld	W	D	L	GF	GA	GD	Pts	Promotion or qualification
1	Shenzhen 2028 (P)	7	5	2	0	17	4	+13	17	Promotion to League Two and qualification for Final
2	Jiangsu Landhouse Dong Victory	7	5	1	1	10	4	+6	16	Qualification for Promotion play-offs
3	Guangdong Mingtu (P)	7	3	4	0	9	4	+5	13	Qualification for Promotion play-offs
4	Qianxinan Xufengtang	7	2	3	2	6	7	−1	9	Qualification for Promotion play-offs
5	Qinghai Xining Kunlun	7	2	2	3	9	10	−1	8	Qualification for Promotion play-offs
6	Xinjiang Snowland Tiancheng	7	2	0	5	8	11	−3	6	
7	Shaanxi Northwest Youth	7	1	2	4	5	13	−8	5	
8	Shanxi Longchengren	7	0	2	5	3	14	−11	2	

Rules for classification:
- During season: 1) Points; 2) Head-to-head points; 3) Head-to-head goal difference; 4) Head-to-head goals scored; 5) Goal difference; 6) Goals scored; 7) Rankings in the previous season. (Rules 2 to 4 are only applied when teams concerned have finished both/all the matches against others.)
- After season: 1) Points; 2) Head-to-head points; 3) Head-to-head goal difference; 4) Head-to-head goals scored; 5) Goal difference; 6) Goals scored; 7) Disciplinary points (yellow card = 1 point, red card = 3 points); 8) Drawing of lots.
  (P) Promoted

=== Group B ===
Pos	Team	Pld	W	D	L	GF	GA	GD	Pts	Promotion or qualification
1	Guizhou Zhucheng Athletic (P)	7	5	2	0	13	7	+6	17	Promotion to League Two and qualification for Final
2	Changchun Xidu (P)	7	4	2	1	9	5	+4	14	Qualification for Promotion play-offs
3	Xiamen 1026	7	3	3	1	12	7	+5	12	Qualification for Promotion play-offs
4	Qujing EB	7	3	2	2	12	10	+2	11	Qualification for Promotion play-offs
5	Guangzhou Alpha (P)	7	2	3	2	5	5	0	9	Qualification for Promotion play-offs
6	Wuhan Lianzhen	7	2	2	3	8	10	−2	8	
7	Zibo Home	7	1	2	4	6	12	−6	5	
8	Shanxi TYUT Yida	7	0	0	7	5	14	−9	0	

Rules for classification:
- During season: 1) Points; 2) Head-to-head points; 3) Head-to-head goal difference; 4) Head-to-head goals scored; 5) Goal difference; 6) Goals scored; 7) Rankings in the previous season. (Rules 2 to 4 are only applied when teams concerned have finished both/all the matches against others.)
- After season: 1) Points; 2) Head-to-head points; 3) Head-to-head goal difference; 4) Head-to-head goals scored; 5) Goal difference; 6) Goals scored; 7) Disciplinary points (yellow card = 1 point, red card = 3 points); 8) Drawing of lots.
  (P) Promoted

=== Promotion play-offs ===
==== First round ====
19 October 2024	Jiangsu Landhouse Dong Victory	1–1 (2–4 p)	Guangzhou Alpha	Nanjing
15:30 UTC+8				Stadium: Nanjing Youth Olympic Sports Park Stadium; Referee: Yan Lifu

20 October 2024	Xiamen 1026	0–0 (4–5 p)	Qianxinan Xufengtang	Xiamen
15:30 UTC+8				Stadium: Haicang Sports Center Stadium; Referee: Wang Jian

20 October 2024	Guangdong Mingtu	1–0	Qujing EB	Zhaoqing
15:30 UTC+8				Stadium: Zhaoqing New District Sports Center Stadium; Referee: Han Lei

20 October 2024	Changchun Xidu	0–0 (5–4 p)	Qinghai Xining Kunlun	Changchun
15:30 UTC+8				Stadium: Development Area Stadium; Referee: Cui Yueqiang

==== Second round ====
27 October 2024	Guangzhou Alpha	1–1 (6–5 p)	Qianxinan Xufengtang	Guangzhou
15:30 UTC+8				Stadium: Zengcheng Stadium; Referee: Niu Minghui

27 October 2024	Guangdong Mingtu	0–0 (6–5 p)	Changchun Xidu	Zhaoqing
15:30 UTC+8				Stadium: Zhaoqing New District Sports Center Stadium; Referee: Shan Dan'ao

=== Final ===
27 October 2024	Guizhou Zhucheng Athletic	1–3	Shenzhen 2028	Guiyang
15:30 UTC+8				Stadium: Guiyang Olympic Sports Center; Referee: Dan Ning

3 November 2024	Shenzhen 2028	3–0	Guizhou Zhucheng Athletic	Shenzhen
16:30 UTC+8				Stadium: Shenzhen Youth Football Training Base Field No.1
