= List of football clubs in China =

This is a list of association football clubs in China, from the top tier of Chinese football, the Chinese Super League, to China League Two, the third tier in the Chinese football league system.

== By league and division ==
- Chinese Super League (Level 1)
- China League One (Level 2)
- China League Two (Level 3)
- Chinese Champions League (Level 4)

== Alphabetical list of clubs ==
The divisions are correct for the 2025 season.

=== Key ===
Key to divisional changes
Club was promoted to a higher level.
Club was relegated to a lower level.

=== B ===
Club	League/Division	Lvl	Change from 2024
Beijing Guoan	Chinese Super League	1	
Beijing Institute of Technology	China League Two	3	

=== C ===
Club	League/Division	Lvl	Change from 2024
Changchun Xidu	China League Two	3	Promoted from Chinese Champions League
Changchun Yatai	Chinese Super League	1	
Chengdu Rongcheng	Chinese Super League	1	
Chengdu Rongcheng B	China League Two	3	Promoted from CFA U-21 League
Chongqing Tonglianglong	China League One	2	

=== D ===
Club	League/Division	Lvl	Change from 2024
Dalian K'un City	China League One	2	Promoted from China League Two
Dalian Yingbo	Chinese Super League	1	Promoted from China League One

=== F ===
Club	League/Division	Lvl	Change from 2024
Foshan Nanshi	China League One	2	

=== G ===
Club	League/Division	Lvl	Change from 2024
Ganzhou Ruishi	China League Two	3	
Guangdong GZ-Power	China League One	2	Promoted from China League Two
Guangdong Mingtu	China League Two	3	Promoted from Chinese Champions League
Guangxi Hengchen	China League Two	3	
Guangxi Lanhang	China League Two	3	
Guangxi Pingguo	China League One	2	New name (formerly Guangxi Pingguo Haliao)
Guangzhou Dandelion Alpha	China League Two	3	Promoted from Chinese Champions League & new name (formerly Guangzhou Alpha)
Guizhou Zhucheng Athletic	China League Two	3	Promoted from Chinese Champions League

=== H ===
Club	League/Division	Lvl	Change from 2024
Haikou Mingcheng	China League Two	3	
Heilongjiang Ice City	China League One	2	
Henan	Chinese Super League	1	
Hubei Istar	China League Two	3	

=== J ===
Club	League/Division	Lvl	Change from 2024
Jiangxi Dark Horse Junior	China League Two	3	
Jiangxi Lushan	China League Two	3	Relegated from China League One

=== L ===
Club	League/Division	Lvl	Change from 2024
Langfang Glory City	China League Two	3	
Liaoning Tieren	China League One	2	

=== M ===
Club	League/Division	Lvl	Change from 2024
Meizhou Hakka	Chinese Super League	1	

=== N ===
Club	League/Division	Lvl	Change from 2024
Nanjing City	China League One	2	
Nantong Haimen Codion	China League Two	3	
Nantong Zhiyun	China League One	2	Relegated from Chinese Super League

=== Q ===
Club	League/Division	Lvl	Change from 2024
Qingdao Hainiu	Chinese Super League	1	
Qingdao Red Lions	China League One	2	
Qingdao West Coast	Chinese Super League	1	
Quanzhou Yassin	China League Two	3	

=== R ===
Club	League/Division	Lvl	Change from 2024
Rizhao Yuqi	China League Two	3	

=== S ===
Club	League/Division	Lvl	Change from 2024
Shaanxi Union	China League One	2	Promoted from China League Two
Shandong Taishan	Chinese Super League	1	
Shandong Taishan B	China League Two	3	
Shanghai Jiading Huilong	China League One	2	
Shanghai Port	Chinese Super League	1	
Shanghai Port B	China League Two	3	
Shanghai Shenhua	Chinese Super League	1	
Shenzhen 2028	China League Two	3	Promoted from Chinese Champions League
Shenzhen Juniors	China League One	2	Promoted from China League Two
Shenzhen Peng City	Chinese Super League	1	
Shijiazhuang Gongfu	China League One	2	
Suzhou Dongwu	China League One	2	

=== T ===
Club	League/Division	Lvl	Change from 2024
Tai'an Tiankuang	China League Two	3	
Tianjin Jinmen Tiger	Chinese Super League	1	

=== W ===
Club	League/Division	Lvl	Change from 2024
Wuhan Three Towns	Chinese Super League	1	
Wuhan Three Towns B	China League Two	3	Promoted from CFA U-21 League
Wuxi Wugo	China League Two	3	Relegated from China League One

=== Y ===
Club	League/Division	Lvl	Change from 2024
Yan'an Ronghai	China League Two	3	New name (formerly Xi'an Chongde Ronghai)
Yanbian Longding	China League One	2	
Yunnan Yukun	Chinese Super League	1	Promoted from China League One

=== Z ===
Club	League/Division	Lvl	Change from 2024
Zhejiang	Chinese Super League	1	

=== Clubs in levels 1–3 last season ===
Club	League/Division	Lvl	Change from 2024
Cangzhou Mighty Lions	Chinese Super League	1	Club folded
Guangzhou	China League One	2	Club folded
Hunan Billows	China League Two	3	Club folded

== See also ==
- List of football clubs in Taiwan
- List of football clubs in Hong Kong
- List of football clubs in Macau
