= Zhu Xinyu =

Chinese footballer (born 2008)

Personal information
- Date of birth: 7 May 2008 (age 18)
- Place of birth: Xishuangbanna, Yunnan, China
- Height: 1.65 m (5 ft 5 in)
- Position: Midfielder

Team information
- Current team: Guangdong Mingtu
- Number: 43

Senior career*
Years	Team	Apps	(Gls)
2025–	Guangdong Mingtu	36	(3)

International career^{‡}
2025–	China U19	5	(0)
- * Club domestic league appearances and goals as of 10 July 2026 ‡ National team caps and goals as of 10 July 2026

Zhu Xinyu (Chinese: 朱信宇; pinyin: Zhū Xìnyǔ; born 7 May 2008) is a Chinese professional footballer who plays as a midfielder for China League Two club Guangdong Mingtu.

== Club career ==
=== Guangdong Mingtu ===
On 11 March 2025, Guangdong Mingtu announced its squad list for the 2025 China League Two season, with Zhu Xinyu assigned the number 43 jersey.

On 20 October 2024, in the first round of the 2024 Chinese Champions League (CMCL) Finals elimination round, Guangdong Mingtu played against Qujing EB. In the 55th minute, Zhu Xinyu sent a through pass to He Jialin, who scored with a long-range shot, giving Guangdong Mingtu a 1–0 lead.

On 14 June 2025, in the 14th round of the 2025 China League Two preliminary stage, Guangdong Mingtu played against Guizhou Zhucheng Athletic at home. In the 15th minute, Zhu Xinyu assisted He Jialin to score a goal.

On 1 July 2025, in the 17th round of the 2025 China League Two preliminary stage, Guangdong Mingtu played against Wuhan Three Towns B at home. In the 25th minute, Zhu Xinyu scored a goal assisted by teammate Huang Guangliang, giving Guangdong Mingtu a 1–0 lead at halftime.

On 30 June 2025, in the 16th round of the 2025 China League Two, Guangdong Mingtu played against Quanzhou Yassin at home. In the 23rd minute, teammate Zhong Wenze sent a cross from the right, and Zhu Xinyu took a left-footed shot that was saved by goalkeeper Zhu Haoxue.

On 27 June 2026, in the 14th round of the 2026 China League Two preliminary stage, Guangdong Mingtu played against Xiamen Feilu at home. In the 8th minute, Zhu Xinyu scored to give Guangdong Mingtu a 1–0 lead.

== International career ==
On 28 November 2025, the Chinese Football Association announced the U-18 national team training camp list for December 2025, with Zhu Xinyu selected.

On 9 January 2026, the Chinese Football Association announced the U-19 national team training camp list for the first phase of 2026, with Zhu Xinyu selected from Guangdong Mingtu Football Club.

On 20 March 2026, the Chinese Football Association announced the U-19 national team training camp list for the second phase of 2026, with Zhu Xinyu selected from Guangdong Mingtu Football Club. The team was scheduled to hold training in Yiwu, Zhejiang from 23 March to 1 April 2026.

On 23 March 2026, Guangdong Mingtu Football Club announced that first-team players Zhong Wenze and Zhu Xinyu were selected for the U-19 national men's football team 2026 second phase training camp.

On 22 May 2026, the Chinese Football Association announced the U-19 national team list for the 2026 Maurice Revello Tournament (Toulon Tournament), with Zhu Xinyu selected.

The U-19 national team departed for France on 29 May 2026. Zhu Xinyu and Fan Mengtong, who played in China League Two, did not report to the team until 28 May, the day before departure, due to club match commitments.

On 31 May 2026, in the first group match of the Toulon Tournament against Saudi Arabia U21, Zhu Xinyu was on the substitute bench and came on as a substitute in the 85th minute, replacing Xie Chuyun.

On 5 June 2026, in the third group match of the Toulon Tournament against Colombia, Zhu Xinyu started the match and was substituted off in the 68th minute, replaced by Xie Chuyun.

== Career statistics ==
=== Club ===
As of 10 July 2026

Appearances and goals by club, season and competition
Club	Season	League			National Cup		Continental		Other		Total	
Club	Season	Division	Apps	Goals	Apps	Goals	Apps	Goals	Apps	Goals	Apps	Goals
Guangdong Mingtu	2026	China League Two	15	2	0	0	—		—		15	2
Guangdong Mingtu	2025	China League Two	21	1	0	0	—		—		21	1
Career total			36	3	0	0	0	0	0	0	36	3
