= Li Xin (footballer, born 1991) =

Chinese footballer

Li Xin 李鑫
Personal information
- Date of birth: November 5, 1991 (age 35)
- Place of birth: Shenyang, Liaoning, China
- Height: 1.75 m (5 ft 9 in)
- Position: Midfielder

Team information
- Current team: Changchun Xidu (on loan from Guizhou Zhucheng Athletic)
- Number: 33

Youth career
- Harbin Yiteng

Senior career*
Years	Team	Apps	(Gls)
2010–2017	Harbin Yiteng	81	(8)
2017	→ Jilin Baijia (loan)	13	(5)
2018	Jilin Baijia	13	(6)
2019–2021	Qingdao Jonoon	38	(2)
2022–2025	Shanghai Jiading Huilong	58	(0)
2025–	Guizhou Zhucheng Athletic	4	(0)
2025–	→ Changchun Xidu (loan)	7	(1)
- * Club domestic league appearances and goals as of 6 May 2022

Li Xin (Chinese: 李鑫; born 5 November 1991 in Shenyang, Liaoning) is a Chinese football player who currently plays for China League Two side Changchun Xidu on loan from Guizhou Zhucheng Athletic.

== Club career ==
In 2010, Li Xin started his professional footballer career with Harbin Yiteng in the China League Two. In the 2011 China League Two campaign he would be part of the team that won the division and promotion into the second tier. He would go on to be a member of the squad as they moved up divisions and gained promotion to the Chinese Super League. He would eventually make his Super league debut for Harbin on 15 March 2014 in a game against Guangzhou Evergrande, coming on as a substitute for Han Deming in the 73rd minute in a 4-1 defeat.

In July 2017, Li was loaned to China League Two club Jilin Baijia until 31 December 2017. This move would be made permanent the following season until on 24 January 2019, Li transferred to fellow League Two side Qingdao Jonoon.

== Career statistics ==
Statistics accurate as of match played 31 December 2020.

Appearances and goals by club, season and competition
Club	Season	League			National Cup		Continental		Other		Total	
Club	Season	Division	Apps	Goals	Apps	Goals	Apps	Goals	Apps	Goals	Apps	Goals
Harbin Yiteng	2010	China League Two			-		-		-			
Harbin Yiteng	2011	China League Two	7	3	-		-		-		7	3
Harbin Yiteng	2012	China League One	18	0	1	0	-		-		19	0
Harbin Yiteng	2013	China League One	16	0	0	0	-		-		16	0
Harbin Yiteng	2014	Chinese Super League	3	0	1	0	-		-		4	0
Harbin Yiteng	2015	China League One	18	4	1	0	-		-		19	4
Harbin Yiteng	2016	China League One	9	0	1	0	-		-		10	0
Harbin Yiteng	2017	China League One	10	1	1	0	-		-		11	1
Harbin Yiteng	Total		81	8	5	0	0	0	0	0	86	8
Jilin Baijia (loan)	2017	China League Two	13	5	0	0	-		-		13	5
Jilin Baijia	2018	China League Two	13	6	2	2	-		-		15	8
Qingdao Jonoon	2019	China League Two	29	2	1	0	-		-		30	2
Qingdao Jonoon	2020	China League Two	6	0	-		-		-		6	0
Qingdao Jonoon	Total		35	2	1	0	0	0	0	0	36	2
Career total			142	21	8	2	0	0	0	0	150	23

== Honours ==
=== Club ===
Harbin Yiteng

- China League Two: 2011
