= Geng Xianglong =

Chinese association football player

Personal information
- Date of birth: 26 June 2003 (age 23)
- Height: 1.81 m (5 ft 11 in)
- Position: Defender

Team information
- Current team: Changchun Xidu

Senior career*
Years	Team	Apps	(Gls)
2021–2022	Nantong Zhiyun	0	(0)
2022-2023	Jinan Xingzhou	0	(0)
2023-2024	Shanghai Shenhua	0	(0)
2024-2025	Xiamen Feilu	12	(1)
2025-2026	Guizhou Guiyang Athletic	19	(0)
2026-	Changchun Xidu	0	(0)
- * Club domestic league appearances and goals as of 00:44, 9 March 2026 (UTC)

Geng Xianglong (Chinese: 耿祥龙; born 26 June 2003) is a Chinese footballer currently playing as a defender for China League Two club Changchun Xidu.

== Career statistics ==
=== Club ===
As of 24 August 2021.

Club	Season	League			Cup		Other		Total	
Club	Season	Division	Apps	Goals	Apps	Goals	Apps	Goals	Apps	Goals
Nantong Zhiyun	2021	China League One	0	0	1 (Note: Appearances in the Chinese FA Cup)	0	0	0	1	0
Career total			0	0	1	0	0	0	1	0
