= Zhang Jiaxin =

Chinese association football player

Personal information
- Date of birth: 1 November 1995 (age 31)
- Place of birth: Shanghai, China
- Height: 1.78 m (5 ft 10 in)
- Position: Right-back

Youth career
- Genbao Football Base
- 2014–2017: Shanghai SIPG

Senior career*
Years	Team	Apps	(Gls)
2017–2018	Jumilla B	9	(1)
2018–2019	Gafanha	1	(0)
2019	Shanghai Shenxin	11	(0)
2020–2023	Qingdao Hainiu	9	(0)
2024–2025	Guizhou Guiyang Athletic	30	(1)
- * Club domestic league appearances and goals

Zhang Jiaxin (Chinese: 张家欣; born 1 November 1995) is a Chinese footballer who plays as a right-back.

== Career ==
Born in Shanghai, Zhang began his career at the Genbao Football Base before joining Shanghai SIPG in 2014. In 2017 he moved to Spain, joining the B team of Jumilla, who were competing in the Primera Autonómica in Murcia, the seventh tier of Spanish football. After nine league appearances and one goal, he moved to Portugal, signing with Campeonato de Portugal club Gafanha. He made his debut for Gafanha 4 November 2018 in a 5–2 win against Sanjoanense.

He returned to China following his spell with Gafanha, signing with Shanghai Shenxin for the 2019 season. Following Shanghai Shenxin's relegation from China League One, Zhang went on trial with Qingdao Hainiu (then known as Qingdao Jonoon) in January 2020, before signing with the club officially in March of the same year. He renewed his contract with the club at the end of the 2020 season.

After two years in the reserve team of Qingdao Hainiu, Zhang moved to Chinese Champions League club Guizhou Guiyang Athletic. On 31 May 2025, in the 77th minute of the match against Kunming City, Zhang, who had been substituted off earlier in the game, was involved in an incident with Kungming City player Li Ou, which saw both players, and Guizhou Guiyang Athletic assistant manager Chen Long, shown red cards. He was handed a two-match ban and fined 10,000 yuan by the Chinese Football Association. In September 2025, Zhang and teammate Shi Yiyi were suspended by Guizhou Guiyang Athletic for refusing to obey management, with neither player featuring for the club again.

== Career statistics ==
=== Club ===
Appearances and goals by club, season and competition
Club	Season	League			Cup (Note: Includes Copa del Rey, Taça de Portugal and Chinese FA Cup)		Other		Total	
Club	Season	Division	Apps	Goals	Apps	Goals	Apps	Goals	Apps	Goals
Jumilla B	2017–18	Primera Autonómica Murcia	9	1	–		0	0	9	1
Gafanha	2018–19	Campeonato de Portugal	1	0	0	0	0	0	1	0
Shanghai Shenxin	2019	China League One	11	0	1	0	0	0	12	0
Qingdao Hainiu	2020	China League Two	8	0	0	0	0	0	8	0
Qingdao Hainiu	2021	China League Two	1	0	0	0	0	0	1	0
Qingdao Hainiu	2022	China League One	0	0	0	0	0	0	0	0
Qingdao Hainiu	2023	Chinese Super League	0	0	0	0	0	0	0	0
Qingdao Hainiu	Total		9	0	0	0	0	0	9	0
Guizhou Guiyang Athletic	2024	Chinese Champions League	13	1	0	0	0	0	13	1
Guizhou Guiyang Athletic	2025	China League Two	17	0	2	0	0	0	19	0
Guizhou Guiyang Athletic	Total		30	1	2	0	0	0	32	1
Career total			60	2	3	0	0	0	63	2
