= Song Bo =

Song Bo may refer to:

- Song Bo (footballer)
- Song Bo (skier)
