= Lu Yi (footballer) =

Chinese footballer

Lu Yi 鲁毅
Personal information
- Full name: Lu Yi
- Date of birth: 20 March 1993 (age 33)
- Place of birth: Zibo, Shandong, China
- Height: 1.80 m (5 ft 11 in)
- Position: Forward

Team information
- Current team: Hefei City

Senior career*
Years	Team	Apps	(Gls)
2012–2019	Qingdao Jonoon	8	(1)
2014	→ Shandong Tengding (loan)	5	(0)
2016	→ Baotou Nanjiao (loan)	9	(1)
2020–2022	Qingdao Red Lions	18	(2)
2022-	Hefei City	0	(0)
- * Club domestic league appearances and goals as of 20 April 2022

Lu Yi (Chinese: 鲁毅; born 20 March 1993 in Zibo, Shandong) is a Chinese footballer who currently plays for Hefei City.

== Club career ==
Lu Yi started his professional football career in 2012 when he was promoted to Chinese Super League club Qingdao Jonoon. On 3 November 2012, Lu made his debut for Qingdao Jonoon in the 2012 Chinese Super League against Shanghai Shenhua, coming on as a substitute for Song Bo in the 67th minute. In July 2014, Lu was loaned to China League Two side Shandong Tengding. He was sent to the Qingdao Jonoon reserved team in 2015.

On 2 February 2016, Lu was loaned to League Two club Baotou Nanjiao until 30 November 2016. He would return to Qingdao for two seasons before being sent to the reserves again in 2019. On 21 August 2020 he would leave Qingdao to join another third tier football club Qingdao Red Lions.

== Career statistics ==
Statistics accurate as of match played 31 December 2020.

Appearances and goals by club, season and competition
Club	Season	League			National Cup		Continental		Other		Total	
Club	Season	Division	Apps	Goals	Apps	Goals	Apps	Goals	Apps	Goals	Apps	Goals
Qingdao Jonoon	2012	Chinese Super League	1	0	0	0	-		-		1	0
Qingdao Jonoon	2013	Chinese Super League	0	0	1	0	-		-		1	0
Qingdao Jonoon	2017	China League Two	5	1	1	0	-		-		6	1
Qingdao Jonoon	2018	China League Two	2	0	0	0	-		-		2	1
Qingdao Jonoon	Total		8	1	2	0	0	0	0	0	10	1
Shandong Tengding (loan)	2014	China League Two	5	0	0	0	-		-		5	0
Baotou Nanjiao (loan)	2016	China League Two	9	1	1	0	-		-		10	1
Qingdao Red Lions	2020	China League Two	6	0	-		-		-		6	0
Career total			28	2	3	0	0	0	0	0	31	2
