= Shenzhen 2028 F.C. =

Association football club in China

Shenzhen 2028
- Full name: Shenzhen 2028 Football Club 深圳二零二八足球俱乐部
- Founded: 2 November 2023; 2 years ago
- Ground: Shenzhen Youth Football Training Base Stadium
- Capacity: 10,000
- Manager: Wang Baoshan
- League: China League Two
- 2025: China League Two, 3rd of 24

Shenzhen 2028 Football Club (simplified Chinese: 深圳二零二八足球俱乐部; traditional Chinese: 深圳二零二八足球俱樂部; pinyin: Shēnzhèn Èrlíng'èrbā Zúqiú Jùlèbù) is a Chinese professional football club based in Shenzhen, Guangdong, that competes in China League Two, the third tier of Chinese football. The club was officially established on 2 November 2023, with the primary goal of supporting the Shenzhen Olympic Glory Plan. Its mission is to develop young talent and prepare school-age players for the 2028 Los Angeles Olympic Games, which inspired the club's name, Shenzhen 2028 F.C.

== History ==
Shenzhen 2028 F.C. was created as part of the Shenzhen Olympic Glory Plan, which aims to cultivate young football talent to represent China in the 2028 Los Angeles Olympic Games. The club's foundation is built on the men's Group A champion team from the 2022 Guangdong Provincial Games, supplemented by school-age players from cities across Guangdong Province, as well as talents from professional clubs such as Qianshenzu and Guangzhou R&F. The team is composed primarily of players born in 2005 and 2006 from the 2022 Guangdong Provincial Games Men's Group A champion squad, with additional players recruited from Guangzhou, Meizhou, and Huizhou, as well as from former professional clubs.The team also serves as the preparation squad for the Guangdong U20 Men's Football Team for the 2025 National Games.

The club adopted a "professional league + National Games" dual-line preparation model, establishing a 2009 age group youth team to build a talent development pathway through interactive training between the first team and youth squads. In the 2024 Chinese Champions League, Shenzhen 2028 won the championship, securing promotion to China League Two. The team remained undefeated in the final round with five wins and two draws, defeating Guizhou Zhucheng 6–1 on aggregate in the final.

For the 2025 season, the club appointed Wang Baoshan as head coach, with former head coach Wang Dong transitioning to team leader to form the coaching staff.

== Current squad ==
Note: Flags indicate national team as defined under FIFA eligibility rules; some limited exceptions apply. Players may hold more than one non-FIFA nationality.

No.	Pos.	Nation	Player
1	GK	CHN	Hao Mujian
4	DF	CHN	Li Mingjie
5	DF	CHN	Hai Jieqing
6	DF	CHN	Luan Cheng
8	MF	CHN	Chen Wei
9	DF	CHN	Luo Kaisa
10	MF	CHN	Li Peilin
11	FW	CHN	Lu Changye
12	FW	CHN	Huang Yongsu
14	GK	CHN	Liu Peiqi
15	DF	CHN	Chen Ziwen
17	DF	CHN	Shi Zihao
20	FW	CHN	Li Lehang

No.	Pos.	Nation	Player
24	MF	CHN	Pan Nuojun
27	MF	CHN	Liu Quanfeng
28	MF	CHN	Wang Zhiyuan
29	FW	CHN	Deng Zhitao
30	MF	CHN	Hu Hongbin
43	GK	CHN	Yuan Jianrui
44	DF	CHN	Huang Junxuan
45	DF	CHN	Yuan Zinan
47	FW	CHN	Huang Zishun
49	FW	CHN	Jiang Wenjing
55	MF	CHN	Huang Keqi
57	FW	CHN	Wang Ziyang
