= Elbug Chagtsel =

Chinese association football player

Personal information
- Date of birth: 26 February 2000 (age 26)
- Place of birth: Hoboksar County, Xinjiang, China
- Height: 1.83 m (6 ft 0 in)
- Position: Forward

Team information
- Current team: Guangxi Bushan
- Number: 9

Senior career*
Years	Team	Apps	(Gls)
2020–2022	Xinjiang Tianshan Leopard	41	(2)
2023	Chongqing Huanshengtai		
2024–	Guangxi Bushan	5	(4)
- * Club domestic league appearances and goals as of 22:33, 1 June 2024 (UTC)

Elbug Chagtsel (Chinese: 额里布格·恰格次力; born 26 February 2000) is a Chinese footballer who plays as a forward for Chinese Champions League club Guangxi Bushan.

== Career ==
In a Xinjiang Tianshan Leopard league match on 20 September 2020, Chagtsel came on as a substitute in a 0–0 draw with Sichuan Jiuniu in his professional debut, becoming the first ever Mongolian Chinese player at the China League One level.

== Career statistics ==
=== Club ===
As of 26 May 2024.

Club	Season	League			Cup		Other		Total	
Club	Season	Division	Apps	Goals	Apps	Goals	Apps	Goals	Apps	Goals
Xinjiang Tianshan Leopard	2020	China League One	11	1	0	0	—		11	1
Xinjiang Tianshan Leopard	2021	China League One	9	0	0	0	—		9	0
Xinjiang Tianshan Leopard	2022	China League One	21	1	0	0	—		21	1
Xinjiang Tianshan Leopard	Total		41	2	0	0	0	0	41	2
Chongqing Huanshengtai	2023	CMCL	—	—	—		—		—	—
Guangxi Bushan	2024	CMCL	5	4	—		—		5	4
Career total			46	6	0	0	0	0	46	6
