= Guigang Sports Centre Stadium =

Sports venue in Guigang, China

Coordinates: 23.1166°N 109.5615°E

- Interactive map of Guigang Sports Centre Stadium
- Location: Guigang, Guangxi, China
- Owner: Guigang Municipal Government
- Capacity: 30,000
- Surface: Grass

Construction
- Opened: 2016

Tenants
- Guangxi Lanhang; Guangxi Hengchen (China League Two)

Guigang Sports Centre Stadium is a multi-purpose stadium located in Guigang, Guangxi, China. Primarily used for football matches, it serves as a hub for sports, cultural events, and community activities. With a seating capacity of 30,000, it is one of the largest stadiums in the region.

== History ==
Constructed in 2016, the stadium was built as part of the Guigang Sports Center complex, which spans 120,000 square meters. It was designed to meet international standards for athletic competitions and has since hosted numerous local and regional football matches, including fixtures for China League Two teams Guangxi Lanhang and Guangxi Hengchen.

== Design and facilities ==
Key design elements include:

- A translucent roof membrane that optimizes natural lighting while shielding spectators from weather.
- Seating arrangements ensuring unobstructed views, with options for general admission, premium seating, and VIP boxes.
- Accessibility features such as wheelchair-accessible seating, ramps, and elevators.
- On-site facilities including concessions, restrooms, merchandise shops, and first-aid rooms.

== Notable events ==
The stadium regularly hosts football matches for China League Two and the Chinese FA Cup. Recent fixtures include:

- 2024-05-11: Guangxi Hengchen vs. Shanghai Port Reserve Squad (2–1).
- 2024-04-28: Guangxi Hengchen vs. Hainan Star (3–1).
- 2024-03-30: Guangxi Lanhang vs. Guangzhou E-Power (1–2).

In addition to sports, the venue has accommodated concerts, cultural performances, and local festivals, leveraging large capacity.
