= Ürümqi Olympic Sports Center =

Sports venue in Ürümqi, China

Coordinates: 43°53′47″N 87°37′51″E

Ürümqi Olympic Sports Center (Chinese: 乌鲁木齐奥林匹克体育中心) is a sports complex located in Ürümqi, Xinjiang, China. The complex covers an area of approximately 480 acres (194 hectares) and boasts a total construction area of around 305,700 m^{2}. In 2023, the Xinjiang Flying Tigers of the Chinese Basketball Association moved to the Ürümqi Olympic Sports Center and signed a strategic partnership.

== Sports facilities ==
- Stadium: A 30,000-seat stadium designed to host major sporting events and concerts.
- Arena: A 12,000-seat arena primarily used for basketball and other indoor sporting events.
- Swimming pool: A 3,000-seat swimming pool complex ideal for aquatic competitions and swimming.
- Track and field hall: A 2,000-seat comprehensive track and field hall suited for athletic training and competitions.

== See also ==
- List of indoor arenas in China
