= Sun Rui (footballer, born 1999) =

Chinese association football player

Personal information
- Date of birth: 14 July 1999 (age 27)
- Height: 1.78 m (5 ft 10 in)
- Position: Midfielder

Team information
- Current team: Wuxi Wugou

Youth career
- –2018: Shandong Taishan

Senior career*
| Years | Team | Apps | (Gls) |
| 2018–2020 | Shandong Taishan | 0 | (0) |
| 2018 | → Zibo Cuju (loan) | 2 | (0) |
| 2020 | → Inner Mongolia Zhongyou (loan) | 1 | (0) |
| 2021 | Hunan Billows | 9 | (0) |
| 2022- | Wuxi Wugou | 0 | (0) |
- * Club domestic league appearances and goals as of 14:01, 27 April 2022 (UTC)

Sun Rui (Chinese: 孙睿; born 14 July 1999) is a Chinese footballer currently playing as a midfielder for Wuxi Wugou.

== Career statistics ==
=== Club ===
As of 28 July 2021.

| Club | Season | League | | | Cup | | Continental | | Other | | Total | |
| Club | Season | Division | Apps | Goals | Apps | Goals | Apps | Goals | Apps | Goals | Apps | Goals |
|---|---|---|---|---|---|---|---|---|---|---|---|---|
| Shandong Taishan | 2018 | Chinese Super League | 0 | 0 | 0 | 0 | 0 | 0 | 0 | 0 | 0 | 0 |
| Shandong Taishan | 2020 | Chinese Super League | 0 | 0 | 0 | 0 | 0 | 0 | 0 | 0 | 0 | 0 |
| Shandong Taishan | 2020 | Chinese Super League | 0 | 0 | 0 | 0 | 0 | 0 | 0 | 0 | 0 | 0 |
| Shandong Taishan | Total | | 0 | 0 | 0 | 0 | 0 | 0 | 0 | 0 | 0 | 0 |
| Zibo Cuju (loan) | 2018 | China League Two | 2 | 0 | 0 | 0 | – | | 0 | 0 | 2 | 0 |
| Inner Mongolia Zhongyou (loan) | 2020 | China League One | 1 | 0 | 0 | 0 | – | | 0 | 0 | 1 | 0 |
| Hunan Billows | 2021 | China League Two | 4 | 0 | 0 | 0 | – | | 0 | 0 | 4 | 0 |
| Career total | | | 7 | 0 | 0 | 0 | 0 | 0 | 0 | 0 | 7 | 0 |
