= Ekremjan Eniwar =

Chinese association football player

Personal information
- Date of birth: 15 January 1999 (age 27)
- Height: 1.80 m (5 ft 11 in)
- Position: Left-back

Team information
- Current team: Xinjiang Tianshan Leopard
- Number: 3

Senior career*
Years	Team	Apps	(Gls)
2017–	Xinjiang Tianshan Leopard	25	(0)
- * Club domestic league appearances and goals as of 14:01, 9 August 2021 (UTC)

Ekremjan Eniwar (Chinese: 艾克热木江·艾尼瓦尔; born 15 January 1999) is a Chinese footballer currently playing as a left-back for Xinjiang Tianshan Leopard.

== Career statistics ==
=== Club ===
As of 9 August 2021.

Club	Season	League			Cup		Other		Total	
Club	Season	Division	Apps	Goals	Apps	Goals	Apps	Goals	Apps	Goals
Xinjiang Tianshan Leopard	2017	China League One	1	0	0	0	0	0	1	0
Xinjiang Tianshan Leopard	2018	China League One	8	0	1 (Note: Appearances in the Chinese FA Cup)	0	0	0	9	0
Xinjiang Tianshan Leopard	2019	China League One	7	0	1	0	0	0	8	0
Xinjiang Tianshan Leopard	2020	China League One	7	0	0	0	0	0	7	0
Xinjiang Tianshan Leopard	2021	China League One	2	0	0	0	0	0	2	0
Career total			25	0	2	0	0	0	27	0
