= Colin Toal =

English footballer and manager (born 1948)

Personal information
- Full name: Colm Joseph Toal
- Date of birth: 6 July 1948 (age 78)
- Place of birth: South London, England
- Position: Forward

Senior career*
Years	Team	Apps	(Gls)
- Tonbridge Angels
- Gravesend & Northfleet
1970–1971	Wimbledon		
1971–1973	Maidstone United		
1973–????	Berea Park		

Managerial career
- 1978: Halmstad (assistant)
- 1990–1994: Trelleborg
- 1996–1997: Norrköping
- 1998–1999: China (assistant)
- 2000–2001: Copenhagen (assistant)
- 2001–2002: Udinese (assistant)
- 2002–2004: Shanghai 2000
- 2005–2006: Uzbekistan U20
- 2006: Panathinaikos (assistant)
- 2007–2014: India (technical director)
- 2007–2013: India U20
- 2015: Shanghai Football School (advisor)
- 2017: Minerva Punjab (technical director)
- 2024: Kunming City
- * Club domestic league appearances and goals

Colm Joseph Toal (born 6 July 1948), often referred to as Colin Toal, is an English football administrator, manager, and former player. In his playing career, he was most prominently a forward for the English club Wimbledon, and also played at Tonbridge Angels, Gravesend & Northfleet, Maidstone United, and played with Roy Hodgson at South African club Berea Park. He managed IFK Norrköping in 1996. He became the technical director of Indian Football. He also worked with Halmstad in 1978, and Trelleborg, the China national football team, Copenhagen, Udinese, the Uzbekistan national under-20 football team, and Panathinaikos in the 1990s and 2000s.

In 2024, he was appointed as manager of Chinese Champions League club Kunming City.
