= Mehmudjan Minem =

Chinese association football player

Personal information
- Date of birth: 15 January 1994 (age 32)
- Place of birth: Ili, Xinjiang, China
- Height: 1.80 m (5 ft 11 in)
- Position: Defender

Team information
- Current team: Xinjiang Tianshan Leopard
- Number: 13

Youth career
- –2013: Xinjiang FA

Senior career*
Years	Team	Apps	(Gls)
2014–2017	Xinjiang Tianshan Leopard		
2020–2023	Xinjiang Tianshan Leopard	11	(0)
- * Club domestic league appearances and goals as of 14:01, 9 August 2021 (UTC)

Mehmudjan Minem (Chinese: 马合木提江·米乃木; born 15 January 1994) is a Chinese footballer who played most recently as a defender for Xinjiang Tianshan Leopard.

== Career statistics ==
=== Club ===
As of 9 August 2021.

Club	Season	League			Cup		Other		Total	
Club	Season	Division	Apps	Goals	Apps	Goals	Apps	Goals	Apps	Goals
Xinjiang FA	2013	–			2 (Note: Appearances in the Chinese FA Cup)	0	0	0	2	0
Xinjiang Tianshan Leopard	2016	China League One	4	0	2	0	0	0	6	0
Xinjiang Tianshan Leopard	2017	China League One	10	0	1	0	0	0	11	0
Xinjiang Tianshan Leopard	2020	China League One	0	0	0	0	0	0	0	0
Xinjiang Tianshan Leopard	2021	China League One	11	0	0	0	0	0	11	0
Xinjiang Tianshan Leopard	Total		25	0	3	0	0	0	28	0
Career total			25	0	5	0	0	0	30	0
