= Mirza'ekber Alim =

Chinese association football player

Personal information
- Birth name: Mirza'ekber Alimjan
- Date of birth: 28 January 1995 (age 31)
- Height: 1.86 m (6 ft 1 in)
- Position: Defender

Team information
- Current team: Xinjiang Tianshan Leopard
- Number: 5

Senior career*
Years	Team	Apps	(Gls)
2015–2018	Shenyang Dongjin	38	(3)
2019–2022	Xinjiang Tianshan Leopard	35	(1)
2022–	Guangxi Hengchen	0	(0)
- * Club domestic league appearances and goals as of 14:01, 9 August 2021 (UTC)

Mirza'ekber Alim (Chinese: 米尔扎艾克拜·阿力木; born Mirza'ekber Alimjan; 28 January 1995) is a Chinese footballer currently playing as a defender for Guangxi Hengchen.

== Career statistics ==
=== Club ===
As of 9 August 2021.

Club	Season	League			Cup		Other		Total	
Club	Season	Division	Apps	Goals	Apps	Goals	Apps	Goals	Apps	Goals
Shenyang Dongjin	2015	China League Two	5	0	0	0	0	0	5	0
Shenyang Dongjin	2016	China League Two	15	0	1 (Note: Appearances in the Chinese FA Cup)	0	0	0	16	0
Shenyang Dongjin	2017	China League Two	18	3	0	0	0	0	18	3
Shenyang Dongjin	2018	China League Two	0	0	0	0	0	0	0	0
Shenyang Dongjin	Total		38	3	1	0	0	0	39	3
Xinjiang Tianshan Leopard	2019	China League One	14	0	1	0	0	0	15	0
Xinjiang Tianshan Leopard	2020	China League One	8	0	0	0	0	0	8	0
Xinjiang Tianshan Leopard	2021	China League One	13	1	0	0	0	0	13	1
Xinjiang Tianshan Leopard	Total		35	1	1	0	0	0	36	1
Career total			73	4	2	0	0	0	75	4
