= Yue Bowen =

Chinese footballer

Personal information
- Date of birth: 14 June 2008 (age 18)
- Position: Defender

Team information
- Current team: Shanghai Port U20

Youth career
- Shanghai Lucky Star

Senior career*
| Years | Team | Apps | (Gls) |
| 2026– | Shanghai Port U20 | 0 | (0) |

International career^{‡}
| 2026– | China U19 | | |
- * Club domestic league appearances and goals as of 15 October 2026 ‡ National team caps and goals as of 15 October 2026

Yue Bowen (Chinese: 岳博文; pinyin: Yuè Bówén; born 14 June 2008) is a Chinese professional footballer who plays as a defender for Shanghai Port U20 in the China Youth Football League U20 Group.

== Early life and youth career ==
Yue Bowen was born on 14 June 2008. He came from Shanghai. He started his football career at Shanghai Lucky Star.

== Club career ==
=== Shanghai Lucky Star ===
Yue Bowen was part of the Shanghai Lucky Star youth setup. In July 2025, he was selected for the Bayern Munich World Squad. He was one of three Chinese players in the squad, alongside Zhang Jiaming and He Jincheng. He played in a friendly match against Shanghai Shenhua U19 on 8 July 2025.

=== Shanghai Port ===
Yue Bowen's Dongqiudi profile shows that on 14 April 2026, he moved from Shanghai Lucky Star Minzhong to Shanghai Port U20 on a free transfer. He plays for Shanghai Port U20 in the China Youth Football League U20 Group. He scored a goal for Shanghai Port U20 in a 4–0 win against Henan U20 on 11 July 2026 in the Chinese Youth Football League. He also scored in a 3–3 draw against Hubei Istar U20 on 22 June 2026.

== International career ==
On 18 September 2026, Yue Bowen was named in the China U19 national team squad for the fourth training camp of 2026, as part of preparations for the 2027 AFC U-20 Asian Cup. He was listed as a defender.

== Career statistics ==
=== Club ===
As of 15 October 2026

Appearances and goals by club, season and competition
| Club | Season | League | | | National Cup | | Continental | | Other | | Total | |
| Club | Season | Division | Apps | Goals | Apps | Goals | Apps | Goals | Apps | Goals | Apps | Goals |
|---|---|---|---|---|---|---|---|---|---|---|---|---|
| Shanghai Port U20 | 2026 | China Youth Football League U20 Group | 0 | 0 | 0 | 0 | — | | — | | 0 | 0 |
| Career total | | | 0 | 0 | 0 | 0 | 0 | 0 | 0 | 0 | 0 | 0 |
