= Ju Feng =

Chinese footballer

Ju Feng 鞠枫
Personal information
- Full name: Ju Feng
- Date of birth: 11 January 1995 (age 31)
- Place of birth: Yingkou, Liaoning, China
- Height: 1.80 m (5 ft 11 in)
- Position: Midfielder

Youth career
- 2013: Liaoning Youth
- 2014: Guangzhou R&F

Senior career*
Years	Team	Apps	(Gls)
2014–2021	Guangzhou Evergrande	0	(0)
2017	→ Ehime FC (loan)	0	(0)
2019	→ Changchun Yatai (loan)	0	(0)
2021	→ Qingdao Youth Island (loan)	15	(1)

International career^{‡}
2016–2017	China U23	5	(0)
- * Club domestic league appearances and goals as of 5 May 2022 ‡ National team caps and goals as of 7 October 2017

Ju Feng (Chinese: 鞠枫; pinyin: Jū Fēng; Mandarin pronunciation: [tɕý fə́ŋ]; born 11 January 1995) is a Chinese footballer.

== Club career ==
Ju Feng started his professional football career in 2013 when he joined Liaoning Youth for the 2013 China League Two. He played 13 league matches of 14 in the season under manager Yasuharu Kurata. Ju moved to Chinese Super League side Guangzhou R&F academy in January 2014 and transferred to Guangzhou Evergrande in the summer.

Ju played at Guangzhou Evergrande's reserved team until he was loaned to J2 League side Ehime FC for one season on 9 March 2017. Before joining Ehime FC, Ju also made trials with several J League clubs such as Montedio Yamagata, Mito HollyHock and Ventforet Kofu in 2016. On 21 June 2017, he made his debut for the club in a 2–1 home win against Kamatamare Sanuki in the second round of 2017 Emperor's Cup. He played two Emperor's Cup matches for Ehime FC in the 2017 season before his loan deal ended on 25 December 2017.

Ju transferred to newly relegated China League One side Changchun Yatai in February 2019. At Changchun, Ju was embroiled in a contract dispute with the club where he claimed that the initial draft of his contract with the club was to see him receive a 20% pay rise and not a pay cut of 97.5% instead. The club still pushed ahead with the players registration with the Chinese Football Association and demanded that he return to Changchun, however Ju claimed he never signed a contract with the club and returned to Guangzhou Evergrande.

== Career statistics ==
As of 31 December 2020.

Appearances and goals by club, season and competition
Club	Season	League			National Cup		League Cup		Continental		Total	
Club	Season	Division	Apps	Goals	Apps	Goals	Apps	Goals	Apps	Goals	Apps	Goals
Liaoning Youth	2013	China League Two	13	0	-		-		-		13	0
Ehime FC (loan)	2017	J2 League	0	0	2	0	-		-		2	0
Changchun Yatai (loan)	2019	China League One	0	0	0	0	-		-		0	0
Career total			13	0	2	0	0	0	0	0	15	0
