= Qujing Cultural and Sports Park =

Public park and sports venue in Qujing, China

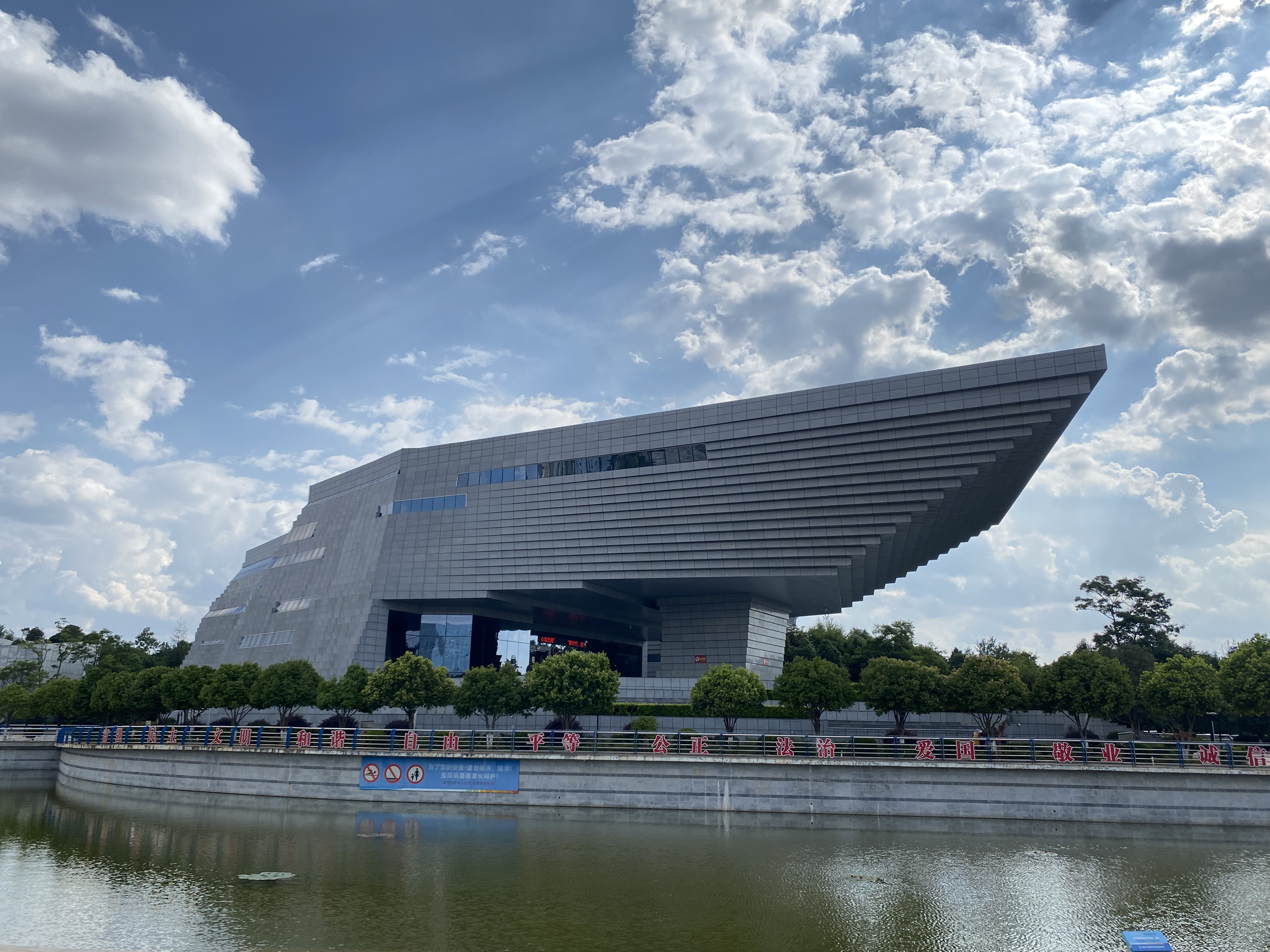
- Qujing Museum at the park

- Location in Yunnan Qujing Cultural and Sports Park (China)
- Location: Qujing, Yunnan, China
- Coordinates: 25.5466°N 103.8174°E
- Capacity: 34,162

Construction
- Opened: 2014
- Cost: 2.1 billion yuan

The Qujing Cultural and Sports Park (Chinese: 曲靖市文化体育公园) is a public park and sports venue in Qujing, Yunnan, China. It has a multipurpose stadium used mostly for soccer matches called Qujing City Sports Center Stadium, with 34,162 seats, a 6,176-seat indoor stadium, and an 18,000-square-meter multipurpose training center. The Qujing government invested 2.1 billion yuan to build the park and its sports facilities. The park opened in 2014.

In 2016, the sports park hosted international soccer, basketball, and tennis matches, as well as national boxing, beach volleyball, and basketball games.
