= Guangdong Mingtu F.C. =

Chinese football club

Guangdong Mingtu
- Full name: Guangdong Mingtu Football Club 广东铭途足球俱乐部
- Founded: 7 March 2024; 2 years ago
- Ground: Huadu Stadium
- Capacity: 13,394
- Manager: Ander Sanabria
- League: China League Two
- 2025: China League Two, 20th of 24

Guangdong Mingtu Football Club (simplified Chinese: 广东铭途足球俱乐部; traditional Chinese: 廣東銘途足球俱樂部; pinyin: Guǎngdōng Míngtú Zúqiú Jùlèbù) is a Chinese professional football club based in Guangzhou, Guangdong, that competes in China League Two, the third tier of Chinese football. The club was officially registered and established on March 7, 2024, through a collaboration between Guangzhou Mingtu Football Club and the Guangdong Football Association.

== History ==
Guangzhou Mingtu Football Club, the predecessor to Guangdong Mingtu F.C., was established in 2019 as a youth-focused football club. By early 2023, the Guangdong Football Association formed a youth team for players from various football establishments within Guangdong Province, including Meizhou Hakka, R&F Football School, Shenzhen Football Association, Zhanjiang, and Guangzhou.

On March 7, 2024, the Guangdong Mingtu Football Club was formally established. The club was built around the U17 team of the Guangdong Football Association and aimed to serve as a platform for talent development, particularly targeting the 15th National Games. The team also competed in the Guangdong Football Association Super League during the 2023-24 season, finishing in fourth place under the temporary name "Shunde Shun Caravan." Guangdong Mingtu participated in the Champions League of the Chinese Football Association Member Association, a tournament for semi-professional clubs and youth teams across China.
