= Song Bo (footballer) =

Chinese footballer

Song Bo 宋博
Personal information
- Full name: Song Bo
- Date of birth: 26 December 1986 (age 39)
- Place of birth: Qingdao, Shandong, China
- Height: 1.75 m (5 ft 9 in)
- Positions: Midfielder; defender

Team information
- Current team: Qingdao Youth Island
- Number: 36

Senior career*
Years	Team	Apps	(Gls)
2005–2006	Qingdao Jonoon	0	(0)
2007–2009	Shanghai Stars	54	(7)
2010–2016	Qingdao Jonoon	59	(0)
2016	→ Yinchuan Helanshan (loan)	11	(1)
2017–2018	Yinchuan Helanshan	48	(9)
2019–2020	Qingdao Jonoon	36	(5)
2021–2022	Qingdao Youth Island	19	(5)
2022	Tai'an Tiankuang	5	(0)
2023	Qingdao May Wind		

Managerial career
- 2024–: Qingdao May Wind
- * Club domestic league appearances and goals as of 4 June 2024

Song Bo (Chinese: 宋博; born 26 December 1986) is a Chinese football manager and former player who is currently the manager of Qingdao May Wind. In his playing career, he played as a midfielder or defender.

== Club career ==
Song Bo started his professional football career in 2005 when he was promoted to Qingdao Jonoon's first squad. In March 2007, Song transferred to China League One side Shanghai Stars. In March 2010, Song returned to Qingdao Jonoon. On 4 April 2010, Song made his debut for Qingdao Jonoon in the 2010 Chinese Super League against Chongqing Lifan, coming on as a substitute for Jiang Ning in the 82nd minute.

In March 2016, Song was loaned to China League Two side Yinchuan Helanshan until 31 December 2016. In March 2019, Song returned to Qingdao Jonoon. After two seasons he would join neighbouring club Qingdao Youth Island and gain promotion with them in his first season.

== Career statistics ==
Statistics accurate as of match played 31 December 2021.

Appearances and goals by club, season and competition
Club	Season	League			National Cup		Continental		Other		Total	
Club	Season	Division	Apps	Goals	Apps	Goals	Apps	Goals	Apps	Goals	Apps	Goals
Qingdao Jonoon	2005	Chinese Super League	0	0			-		-		0	0
Qingdao Jonoon	2006	Chinese Super League	0	0			-		-		0	0
Qingdao Jonoon	Total		0	0	0	0	0	0	0	0	0	0
Shanghai Stars	2007	China League One	17	4	-		-		-		17	4
Shanghai Stars	2008	China League One	17	2	-		-		-		17	2
Shanghai Stars	2009	China League One	20	1	-		-		-		20	1
Shanghai Stars	Total		54	7	0	0	0	0	0	0	57	7
Qingdao Jonoon	2010	Chinese Super League	21	0	-		-		-		21	0
Qingdao Jonoon	2011	Chinese Super League	17	0	1	0	-		-		18	0
Qingdao Jonoon	2012	Chinese Super League	7	0	1	0	-		-		8	0
Qingdao Jonoon	2013	Chinese Super League	4	0	2	1	-		-		6	1
Qingdao Jonoon	2014	China League One	10	0	2	0	-		-		12	0
Qingdao Jonoon	2015	China League One	0	0	0	0	-		-		0	0
Qingdao Jonoon	Total		59	0	6	1	0	0	0	0	65	1
Yinchuan Helanshan (loan)	2016	China League Two	11	1	2	0	-		-		13	1
Yinchuan Helanshan	2017	China League Two	26	4	1	0	-		-		27	4
Yinchuan Helanshan	2018	China League Two	22	5	3	2	-		-		25	7
Yinchuan Helanshan	Total		48	9	6	2	0	0	0	0	54	11
Qingdao Jonoon	2019	China League Two	28	3	1	0	-		-		29	3
Qingdao Jonoon	2020	China League Two	8	2	-		-		-		8	2
Qingdao Jonoon	Total		36	5	1	0	0	0	0	0	37	6
Qingdao Youth Island	2021	China League Two	18	6	2	1	-		2 (Note: Appearance(s) in CL1 Relegation play-offs)	0	22	7
Qingdao Youth Island	2022	China League One	0	0	0	0	-		-		0	0
Qingdao Youth Island	Total		18	6	2	1	0	0	2	0	22	7
Career total			226	28	15	4	0	0	2	0	243	32
