= Changchun Xidu F.C. =

Changchun Xidu
- Full name: Changchun Xidu Football Club 长春喜都足球俱乐部
- Founded: 7 February 2021; 5 years ago
- Manager: Li Bin
- League: China League Two
- 2025: China League Two, 8th of 24

Changchun Xidu Football Club (Chinese: 长春喜都足球俱乐部; pinyin: Chángchūn Xǐdū Zúqiú Jùlèbù) is a Chinese professional football club based in Changchun, Jilin, that competes in China League Two, the third tier of Chinese football.

== History ==
Changchun Xidu Football Club traces its origins to the dissolution of Jilin Baijia Football Club in early 2020, which was caused by the COVID-19 pandemic and changes in investor strategies. Following the dissolution, 26 players from Jilin Baijia's youth teams were retained and joined Jilin Senyang Football Club, a new team founded by former coaches of Jilin Baijia. The club was officially registered on February 7, 2021, and later renamed Changchun Xidu Football Club on May 7, 2022.

The club were promoted to China League Two for the 2025 season, with a number of teams in the Chinese football pyramid being dissolved and leaving spaces available. The team ended the season eighth in the league after securing a place in the promotion round.
