= Guizhou Guiyang Athletic F.C. =

Association football club in China

Guizhou Guiyang Athletic
- Full name: Guizhou Guiyang Athletic Football Club 贵州贵阳竞技足球俱乐部
- Founded: 12 May 2023; 3 years ago
- Ground: Guiyang Olympic Sports Center
- Capacity: 51,636
- Manager: Chen Long
- League: China League Two
- 2025: China League Two, 5th of 24

Guizhou Guiyang Athletic Football Club (Chinese: 贵州贵阳竞技足球俱乐部; pinyin: Guìzhōu Guìyáng Jìngjì Zúqiú Jùlèbù) is a Chinese professional football club based in Guiyang, Guizhou, that competes in China League Two, the third tier of Chinese football. Founded on May 12, 2023, the club is built on the youth training foundation of the Guizhou Qianzhixing Youth Football Club. Guizhou Guiyang operates under a strategic cooperation agreement between Guiyang Sports Development Co., Ltd. and Guizhou Qianzhixing Football Club Co., Ltd.

== History ==
Guizhou Zhucheng Athletic Football Club was officially established on May 12, 2023, following a collaboration between Guiyang Sports Development Co., Ltd. and Guizhou Qianzhixing Football Club Co., Ltd. Leveraging the robust youth training system of Guizhou Qianzhixing Youth Football Club, the team was created with the dual goals of competing in professional leagues and promoting football culture in Guizhou Province.

In the 2024 Chinese Champions League, Guizhou Zhucheng Athletic finished first in Group B with 5 wins, 2 draws, and 17 points, securing their place in the 2024 Chinese Champions League.
