= List of Chinese football transfers winter 2018 =

This is a list of Chinese football transfers for the 2018 season winter transfer window. Super League and League One transfer window opened on 1 January 2018 and closed on 28 February 2018. League Two transfer window opened on 1 March 2018 and closed on 9 March 2018.

== Super League ==
=== Beijing Renhe ===
In:

| No. | Pos. | Nation | Player |
|---|---|---|---|
| 8 | MF | ARG | Augusto Fernández (from (Spain) Atlético Madrid) |
| 21 | FW | CHN | Jin Hui (from Beijing Enterprises) |
| 27 | DF | CHN | Liu Jian (from Guangzhou Evergrande Taobao) |
| 29 | MF | CHN | Nizamdin Afanti (from Nei Mongol Zhongyou) |
| 33 | MF | CHN | Wang Chu (loan from (Portugal) Cova da Piedade) |
| 38 | FW | CMR | Benjamin Moukandjo (loan from Jiangsu Suning) |
| - | FW | CHN | Shen Tianfeng (loan return from Jiangxi Liansheng) |
| - | GK | CHN | Lu Ning (loan return from Dalian Boyoung) |
| - | FW | CRO | Nikica Jelavić (loan return from Guizhou Hengfeng) |

Out:

| No. | Pos. | Nation | Player |
|---|---|---|---|
| 7 | FW | KEN | Ayub Masika (loan to Heilongjiang Lava Spring) |
| 14 | FW | CHN | Yang Yihu (loan to Heilongjiang Lava Spring) |
| 18 | DF | CHN | Han Xuan (to Henan Jianye) |
| 19 | DF | CHN | Liu Tianqi (to Dalian Transcendence) |
| 24 | MF | CHN | Zhang Yuxuan (Released) |
| 25 | DF | CHN | Deng Hanwen (to Guangzhou Evergrande Taobao) |
| 27 | FW | CHN | Fan Bojian (loan to Heilongjiang Lava Spring) |
| 32 | MF | CHN | Gan Chao (to Shenzhen F.C.) |
| 41 | FW | CHN | Xiang Ben (to Heilongjiang Lava Spring) |
| 42 | MF | CHN | Ji Yong (Released) |
| 45 | FW | CHN | Sun Ya (to Tianjin Teda) |
| 47 | DF | CHN | Hu Jing (to Heilongjiang Lava Spring) |
| 50 | DF | CHN | He Xi (to Heilongjiang Lava Spring) |
| 51 | MF | CHN | Huang Jun (to Heilongjiang Lava Spring) |
| 52 | MF | CHN | Zhang Liangjian (Released) |
| 53 | MF | CHN | Jiang Yu (to Heilongjiang Lava Spring) |
| 54 | DF | CHN | Chen Guoqing (to Shenzhen F.C.) |
| - | GK | CHN | Lu Ning (to Heilongjiang Lava Spring) |
| - | FW | CRO | Nikica Jelavić (to Guizhou Hengfeng) |

=== Beijing Sinobo Guoan ===
In:

| No. | Pos. | Nation | Player |
|---|---|---|---|
| 6 | MF | CHN | Chi Zhongguo (from Yanbian Funde) |
| 7 | MF | CHN | Wei Shihao (from (Portugal) Leixões) |
| 11 | MF | CHN | Hu Yanqiang (from Liaoning F.C.) |
| 15 | DF | CHN | Liu Huan (from Chongqing Dangdai Lifan) |
| 17 | FW | COD | Cédric Bakambu (from (Spain) Villarreal) |
| 20 | MF | CHN | Wang Ziming (loan return from Qingdao Jonoon) |
| 23 | MF | ESP | Jonathan Viera (from (Spain) Las Palmas) |
| 32 | MF | CHN | Liu Guobo (from Shanghai SIPG) |
| 33 | GK | CHN | Chi Wenyi (from Yanbian Funde) |
| - | DF | CHN | Sheng Pengfei (loan return from Dalian Boyoung) |
| - | DF | CHN | Li Bowen (loan return from Beijing BIT) |
| - | MF | CHN | Wang Hongyu (loan return from Beijing BIT) |
| - | MF | CHN | Zhong Jiyu (loan return from Beijing BIT) |

Out:

| No. | Pos. | Nation | Player |
|---|---|---|---|
| 2 | DF | UZB | Egor Krimets (loan return to (Uzbekistan) Pakhtakor Tashkent) |
| 5 | MF | BRA | Ralf (to (Brazil) Corinthians) |
| 6 | MF | CHN | Zhang Xiaobin (Released) |
| 11 | MF | CHN | Song Boxuan (to Tianjin Quanjian) |
| 16 | MF | CHN | Du Mingyang (loan to Wuhan Chufeng Heli) |
| 20 | DF | CHN | Zhang Xinxin (Retired) |
| 23 | MF | CHN | Tang Shi (loan return to Meizhou Hakka) |
| 27 | MF | CHN | Wu Guichao (to Meizhou Meixian Techand) |
| 31 | DF | CHN | Zhao Hejing (to Guizhou Hengfeng) |
| 32 | DF | CHN | Wei Xin (to Shanghai Sunfun) |
| 43 | DF | CHN | Wu Bo (to (South Korea) Bucheon FC) |
| 52 | MF | CHN | He Yuan (to Beijing Enterprises) |
| 55 | MF | CHN | Xu Ziteng (to Binzhou Dongchen) |
| 63 | DF | CHN | Huang Tao (to Beijing Enterprises) |
| - | DF | CHN | Li Bowen (to (Portugal) C.D. Aves) |
| - | MF | CHN | Wang Hongyu (to Shijiazhuang Ever Bright) |
| - | MF | CHN | Zhong Jiyu (to Shijiazhuang Ever Bright) |

=== Changchun Yatai ===
In:

| No. | Pos. | Nation | Player |
|---|---|---|---|
| 6 | MF | CHN | Xue Ya'nan (from Dalian Transcendence) |
| 10 | FW | DEN | Lasse Vibe (from (England) Brentford) |
| 18 | MF | CHN | Han Zilong (from Hebei Elite) |
| 20 | FW | CHN | Tan Tiancheng (from Yinchuan Helanshan) |
| 24 | DF | CHN | Yan Zhiyu (from Xinjiang Tianshan Leopard) |
| - | DF | CHN | Yan Shipeng (loan return from Shaanxi Chang'an Athletic) |
| - | DF | CHN | Shao Shuai (loan return from Hebei Elite) |
| - | MF | CHN | Han Deming (loan return from Shaanxi Chang'an Athletic) |
| - | MF | CHN | Yang He (loan return from Hebei Elite) |
| - | MF | CHN | Li Xiaoting (loan return from Heilongjiang Lava Spring) |
| - | MF | CHN | Zhu Yifan (loan return from Hebei Elite) |

Out:

| No. | Pos. | Nation | Player |
|---|---|---|---|
| 2 | DF | TPE | Yaki Yen (to Qingdao Huanghai) |
| 10 | MF | HUN | Szabolcs Huszti (to (Hungary) Videoton) |
| 14 | DF | HKG | Jack Sealy (to (Hong Kong) Tai Po) |
| 18 | DF | CHN | Guo Liang (to Dalian Boyoung) |
| 24 | MF | CHN | Yan Feng (to Shaanxi Chang'an Athletic) |
| 35 | FW | BRA | Bruno Meneghel (to (Japan) Albirex Niigata) |
| 41 | DF | CHN | Li Hong (to Zhejiang Yiteng) |
| - | MF | CHN | Yang He (to Shaanxi Chang'an Athletic) |
| - | MF | CHN | Li Xiaoting (Released) |
| - | MF | CHN | Zhu Yifan (to Shenyang Urban) |

=== Chongqing Dangdai Lifan ===
In:

| No. | Pos. | Nation | Player |
|---|---|---|---|
| 4 | DF | CHN | Luo Hao (from Nei Mongol Zhongyou) |
| 5 | MF | CHN | Jiang Jiajun (from Shandong Luneng Taishan) |
| 13 | FW | CHN | Yin Congyao (from Nei Mongol Zhongyou) |
| 15 | MF | ARG | Nicolás Aguirre (from (Argentina) Lanús) |
| 19 | MF | CHN | Tang Jiashu (from Beijing Enterprises) |
| 20 | DF | CHN | Liu Le (from Shenzhen Ledman) |
| 28 | DF | CHN | Cao Dong (from Shanghai Greenland Shenhua) |
| 30 | FW | BRA | Fernandinho (from (Brazil) Grêmio) |
| 31 | DF | CHN | Liu Bin (from Guizhou Hengfeng) |
| 33 | MF | CHN | Chen Zhongliu (from Zhejiang Greentown) |
| 46 | MF | CHN | He Jiantao (from Shenyang Dongjin) |
| - | GK | CHN | Pan Long (from Shanghai Sunfun) |
| - | FW | CHN | Luo Jiewu (from Shanghai Sunfun) |

Out:

| No. | Pos. | Nation | Player |
|---|---|---|---|
| 5 | MF | KOR | Jung Woo-young (to (Japan) Vissel Kobe) |
| 14 | FW | BRA | Hyuri (loan return to (Brazil) Atlético Mineiro) |
| 15 | DF | CRO | Goran Milović (loan to (Croatia) NK Osijek) |
| 18 | MF | CHN | Xu Yang (to Shenzhen F.C.) |
| 19 | DF | CHN | Liu Huan (to Beijing Sinobo Guoan) |
| 25 | DF | CHN | Liao Junjian (loan return to Hebei China Fortune) |
| 33 | MF | CHN | Nan Song (loan return to (South Korea) Bucheon FC) |
| 42 | FW | CHN | Han Zixuan (to Henan Jianye) |
| 43 | MF | CHN | Cao Yanan (loan to Shanghai Sunfun) |
| 48 | DF | CHN | Liao Junjie (loan to Shanghai Sunfun) |
| 50 | FW | CHN | Zhang Cheng (loan to Shanghai Sunfun) |
| 56 | DF | CHN | Cao Yue (to Qingdao Huanghai) |
| 65 | DF | CHN | Cao Dong (loan return to Shanghai Greenland Shenhua) |

=== Dalian Yifang ===
In:

| No. | Pos. | Nation | Player |
|---|---|---|---|
| 5 | DF | POR | José Fonte (from (England) West Ham United) |
| 7 | MF | CHN | Wang Liang (from Liaoning F.C.) |
| 9 | MF | ARG | Nicolás Gaitán (from (Spain) Atlético Madrid) |
| 10 | MF | BEL | Yannick Carrasco (from (Spain) Atlético Madrid) |
| 17 | MF | CHN | Zhang Hui (loan return from Shaanxi Chang'an Athletic) |
| 27 | DF | CHN | Zheng Jianfeng (from Dalian Transcendence) |
| 31 | DF | CHN | Yang Shanping (loan from Tianjin Quanjian) |
| 38 | FW | CHN | Yang Fangzhi (loan return from Dalian Transcendence) |
| - | DF | CHN | Wu Yuyin (loan return from Yinchuan Helanshan) |
| - | FW | CHN | Duan Yunzi (loan return from Shenyang Urban) |

Out:

| No. | Pos. | Nation | Player |
|---|---|---|---|
| 3 | DF | CHN | Cao Xuan (to Shijiazhuang Ever Bright) |
| 5 | DF | ARG | Jonathan Ferrari (Released) |
| 10 | FW | CIV | Yannick Boli (to (United States) Colorado Rapids) |
| 14 | MF | CHN | Qu Xiaohui (to Dalian Boyoung) |
| 24 | MF | CHN | Han Xu (to Meixian Techand) |
| 28 | DF | CHN | Du Yuxin (to Zibo Sunday) |
| 30 | DF | CHN | Han Xuegeng (to Dalian Boyoung) |
| 42 | GK | CHN | Li Xinyu (to Meizhou Hakka) |
| 43 | DF | CHN | Li Zhen (to Liaoning F.C.) |
| 45 | DF | CHN | Fu Yuncheng (loan to Dalian Boyoung) |
| 52 | MF | CHN | Song Xiaoyu (to Dalian Boyoung) |
| 55 | MF | CHN | Tian Lianbin (to Dalian Transcendence) |
| 58 | MF | CHN | Wang Junhao (to Baoding Yingli Yitong) |
| - | GK | CHN | Liu Yipeng (to Dalian Transcendence) |
| - | FW | CHN | Duan Yunzi (loan to Sichuan Longfor) |

=== Guangzhou Evergrande Taobao ===
In:

| No. | Pos. | Nation | Player |
|---|---|---|---|
| 8 | MF | SRB | Nemanja Gudelj (from Tianjin TEDA) |
| 17 | FW | CHN | Yang Liyu (from (Portugal) Gondomar) |
| 18 | MF | CHN | Guo Jing (loan return from Meizhou Hakka) |
| 22 | MF | CHN | Tang Shi (from Meizhou Hakka) |
| 23 | DF | CHN | Deng Hanwen (from Beijing Renhe) |
| 30 | DF | CHN | Hu Ruibao (from (Denmark) Vejle Boldklub) |
| 33 | DF | CHN | Zhong Yihao (from Qingdao Jonoon) |
| 40 | GK | CHN | Liu Shibo (loan return from Nei Mongol Zhongyou) |
| 54 | DF | CHN | Lü Zheng (from Shenzhen F.C.) |
| - | DF | CHN | Deng Shinan (loan return from Lhasa Urban Construction Investment) |
| - | GK | CHN | Fang Zihong (loan return from Lhasa Urban Construction Investment) |
| - | DF | CHN | Gong Liangxuan (loan return from Chengdu Qbao) |
| - | DF | CHN | Han Pengfei (loan return from Guizhou Hengfeng) |
| - | MF | CHN | Huang Yuangqiang (loan return from Lhasa Urban Construction Investment) |
| - | MF | CHN | Ju Feng (loan return from (Japan) Ehime FC) |
| - | DF | CHN | Liu Haidong (loan return from Heilongjiang Lava Spring) |
| - | DF | CHN | Liu Hao (loan return from Guizhou Hengfeng) |
| - | GK | CHN | Liu Weiguo (loan return from Yinchuan Helanshan) |
| - | MF | CHN | Shewket Yalqun (loan return from Xinjiang Tianshan Leopard) |
| - | FW | CHN | Xie Weijun (loan return from Lhasa Urban Construction Investment) |
| - | GK | CHN | Xu Guangliao (loan return from Lhasa Urban Construction Investment) |
| - | MF | CHN | Xu Li'ao (loan return from (Bulgaria) OFC Pomorie) |
| - | MF | CHN | Zhang Jiaqi (loan return from Shenzhen F.C.) |
| - | DF | CHN | Zhou Xin (loan return from Lhasa Urban Construction Investment) |

Out:

| No. | Pos. | Nation | Player |
|---|---|---|---|
| 9 | FW | COL | Jackson Martínez (Released) |
| 13 | GK | CHN | Fang Jingqi (to Meizhou Meixian Techand) |
| 14 | DF | CHN | Rong Hao (loan to Shanghai Greenland Shenhua) |
| 17 | DF | CHN | Liu Jian (to Beijing Renhe) |
| 18 | MF | CHN | Yang Xin (to Jiangxi Liansheng) |
| 26 | FW | CHN | Wang Jingbin (loan to Shanghai Shenxin) |
| 30 | FW | BRA | Muriqui (to Meizhou Meixian Techand) |
| 42 | MF | CHN | Wang Rui (to Shenzhen Ledman) |
| 45 | MF | CHN | Li Geng (loan to Dalian Transcendence) |
| 47 | DF | CHN | Wu Yue (to Shenzhen Pengcheng) |
| 48 | MF | CHN | Zheng Jie (loan to (France) Auxerre) |
| 52 | DF | CHN | Guan Haojin (loan to Yinchuan Helanshan) |
| 53 | FW | CHN | Ye Guochen (loan to Yinchuan Helanshan) |
| 54 | MF | CHN | Zhou Wenxin (to Shenzhen Pengcheng) |
| 55 | MF | CHN | Guo Tao (to Shenzhen Pengcheng) |
| - | MF | CHN | Chen Zijie (loan to Yinchuan Helanshan) |
| - | GK | CHN | Fang Zihong (loan to Nei Mongol Zhongyou) |
| - | MF | CHN | Gan Tiancheng (to Shenzhen Ledman) |
| - | DF | CHN | Han Pengfei (to Guizhou Hengfeng) |
| - | MF | CHN | Hu Yangyang (to Hainan Boying) |
| - | MF | CHN | Huang Yuanqiang (to Meizhou Meixian Techand) |
| - | DF | CHN | Liu Haidong (to Hainan Boying) |
| - | DF | CHN | Liu Hao (to Guizhou Hengfeng) |
| - | DF | CHN | Lin Jianwei (to Qingdao Huanghai) |
| - | DF | CHN | Liu Ruicheng (loan to Nei Mongol Zhongyou) |
| - | MF | CHN | Luo Jiacheng (to Zhenjiang Huasa) |
| - | MF | CHN | Wu Xiaotian (to Shijiazhuang Ever Bright) |
| - | FW | CHN | Xie Weijun (to Tianjin Teda) |
| - | DF | CHN | Yang Zhaohui (loan to (South Korea) Busan FC) |
| - | MF | CHN | Zhang Jiaqi (loan to Guangzhou R&F) |

=== Guangzhou R&F ===
In:

| No. | Pos. | Nation | Player |
|---|---|---|---|
| 5 | MF | CHN | Zhang Jiaqi (loan from Guangzhou Evergrande Taobao) |
| 6 | MF | CHN | Cai Haojian (from Zhaoqing Hengtai) |
| 9 | FW | CHN | Chang Feiya (loan return from Guizhou Hengfeng) |
| 11 | DF | CHN | Ding Haifeng (from Hebei China Fortune) |
| 14 | FW | SRB | Marko Perović (loan from (Hong Kong) R&F) |
| 22 | DF | CHN | Zheng Zhiming (Free agent) |
| 34 | DF | CHN | Wang Xin (from (Denmark) Vejle BK) |
| 38 | MF | CHN | Chen Yajun (Free agent) |
| - | GK | CHN | Pei Chensong (loan return from (Hong Kong) R&F) |
| - | MF | CHN | Huang Haoxuan (loan return from Lhasa Urban Construction Investment) |
| - | MF | CHN | Xiang Jiachi (loan return from Lhasa Urban Construction Investment) |
| - | DF | CHN | Yang Ting (loan return from Guizhou Hengfeng) |
| - | FW | CHN | Min Junlin (loan return from Guizhou Hengfeng) |
| - | FW | CHN | Chen Jiaqi (loan return from Lhasa Urban Construction Investment) |

Out:

| No. | Pos. | Nation | Player |
|---|---|---|---|
| 3 | DF | CHN | Xiang Baixu (to Shenzhen F.C.) |
| 5 | DF | ISL | Sölvi Ottesen (to (Iceland) Víkingur Reykjavík) |
| 6 | MF | CHN | Yang Wanshun (to Tianjin Teda) |
| 9 | FW | AUS | Apostolos Giannou (to (Cyprus) AEK Larnaca) |
| 11 | DF | CHN | Jiang Zhipeng (to Hebei China Fortune) |
| 13 | MF | CHN | Ye Chugui (loan to Shenzhen F.C.) |
| 14 | FW | CHN | Zeng Chao (to Meizhou Meixian Techand) |
| 21 | MF | CHN | Zhu Di (to Baoding Yingli Yitong) |
| 49 | GK | CHN | Ji Xiangzheng (loan to (Hong Kong) R&F) |
| 54 | GK | CHN | Xing Yu (to Qingdao Huanghai) |
| - | GK | CHN | Pei Chensong (loan to Hainan Boying) |
| - | MF | CHN | Xiang Jiachi (to Xinjiang Tianshan Leopard) |
| - | DF | CHN | Yang Ting (to Guizhou Hengfeng) |
| - | FW | CHN | Min Junlin (to Guizhou Hengfeng) |
| - | FW | CHN | Chen Jiaqi (to Qingdao Jonoon) |

=== Guizhou Hengfeng ===
In:

| No. | Pos. | Nation | Player |
|---|---|---|---|
| 4 | DF | CHN | Yang Ting (from Guangzhou R&F) |
| 8 | MF | CHN | Zhang Yuan (loan from Tianjin Quanjian) |
| 9 | FW | GAM | Bubacarr Trawally (loan from (Denmark) Vejle BK) |
| 11 | FW | CRO | Nikica Jelavić (from Beijing Renhe) |
| 14 | MF | CHN | Zhu Zhengyu (from Shanghai SIPG) |
| 18 | FW | CHN | Min Junlin (from Guangzhou R&F) |
| 19 | DF | CHN | Zheng Kaimu (from Shanghai Greenland Shenhua) |
| 23 | DF | CHN | Han Pengfei (from Guangzhou Evergrande Taobao) |
| 27 | DF | CHN | Liu Hao (from Guangzhou Evergrande Taobao) |
| 29 | MF | CHN | Chen Ji (loan from Jiangsu Suning) |
| 30 | GK | CHN | Zhang Sipeng (from Jiangsu Suning) |
| 31 | DF | CHN | Zhao Hejing (from Beijing Sinobo Guoan) |
| 35 | DF | CHN | Du Wei (from Hebei China Fortune) |
| 49 | MF | CHN | Chen Qi (from Hunan Billows) |
| 50 | DF | CHN | Wang Lei (from (Serbia) Mladost Lučani) |
| 55 | DF | CHN | Tang Yuan (from Chengdu Qbao) |
| 60 | GK | CHN | Liu Chang (from Shenyang Urban) |

Out:

| No. | Pos. | Nation | Player |
|---|---|---|---|
| 4 | DF | CHN | Yang Ting (loan return to Guangzhou R&F) |
| 11 | FW | CRO | Nikica Jelavić (loan return to Beijing Renhe) |
| 18 | FW | CHN | Min Junlin (loan return to Guangzhou R&F) |
| 19 | FW | CHN | Chang Feiya (loan return to Guangzhou R&F) |
| 20 | MF | CHN | Liang Yanfeng (to Yanbian Beiguo) |
| 23 | DF | CHN | Han Pengfei (loan return to Guangzhou Evergrande Taobao) |
| 29 | DF | CHN | Liu Hao (loan return to Guangzhou Evergrande Taobao) |
| 30 | DF | CHN | Leng Shiao (loan return to Shanghai Shenhua) |
| 31 | MF | HKG | Au Yeung Yiu Chung (to (Hong Kong) Dreams) |
| 35 | DF | CHN | Du Wei (loan return to Hebei China Fortune) |
| 38 | DF | CHN | Zhao Hui (to Yanbian Beiguo) |
| 39 | MF | CHN | Chen Zewen (to Anhui Hefei Guiguan) |
| 40 | FW | ESP | Rubén Castro (loan return to (Spain) Real Betis) |
| 41 | DF | CHN | Zhao Huibo (to Yanbian Beiguo) |
| 50 | DF | CHN | Liu Bin (to Chongqing Dangdai Lifan) |

=== Hebei China Fortune ===
In:

| No. | Pos. | Nation | Player |
|---|---|---|---|
| 5 | DF | CHN | Lang Zheng (loan return from Liaoning F.C.) |
| 10 | MF | BRA | Hernanes (loan return from (Brazil) São Paulo) |
| 13 | DF | CHN | Cui Lin (from (Portugal) GS Loures) |
| 14 | MF | ARG | Javier Mascherano (from (Spain) Barcelona) |
| 15 | MF | CHN | Wang Qiuming (from Tianjin TEDA) |
| 18 | MF | CHN | Feng Gang (from Zhejiang Greentown) |
| 20 | MF | CHN | Hu Rentian (from Tianjin TEDA) |
| 21 | DF | CHN | Jiang Zhipeng (from Guangzhou R&F) |
| 37 | FW | CHN | Gao Huaze (from Zhejiang Greentown) |
| 44 | MF | CHN | Ma Bokang (from Xinjiang Tianshan Leopard) |
| 51 | DF | CHN | Liu Jing (from Zhejiang Greentown) |
| - | GK | CHN | Chen Shaohong (from Shanghai Sunfun) |
| - | DF | CHN | Du Wei (loan return from Guizhou Hengfeng) |
| - | DF | CHN | Liao Junjian (loan return from Chongqing Lifan) |
| - | FW | CHN | Wu Yufan (loan return from Qingdao Jonoon) |
| - | DF | CHN | Xu Xiaolong (loan return from Shanghai Shenxin) |

Out:

| No. | Pos. | Nation | Player |
|---|---|---|---|
| 5 | DF | CHN | Du Wei (to Guizhou Hengfeng) |
| 14 | DF | KOR | Kim Ju-young (Released) |
| 16 | DF | CHN | Liao Junjian (loan to Wuhan Zall) |
| 17 | MF | CHN | Zhu Haiwei (to Zhejiang Greentown) |
| 20 | FW | CHN | Wang Yang (Released) |
| 21 | FW | BRA | Aloísio (to Meizhou Meixian Techand) |
| 25 | MF | CMR | Stéphane Mbia (Released) |
| 30 | MF | CHN | Li Hang (to Wuhan Zall) |
| 32 | DF | CHN | Ding Haifeng (to Guangzhou R&F) |
| 34 | GK | CHN | Su Weichao (Released) |
| 43 | MF | CHN | Zhong Jiajie (to Zhenjiang Huasa) |
| 44 | DF | CHN | Wei Jiye (to Qingdao Jonoon) |
| 45 | DF | CHN | Zhang Ao (to Hainan Boying) |
| 52 | MF | CHN | Shi Hanchen (to Qingdao Huanghai) |
| 58 | FW | CHN | Wu Yufan (to Suzhou Dongwu) |
| - | DF | CHN | Xu Xiaolong (to Zhejiang Greentown) |
| - | FW | CHN | Feng Hanyuan (to Liaoning F.C.) |
| - | GK | CHN | Lin Jiangshan (to Shaanxi Chang'an Athletic) |
| - | MF | CHN | Liu Tianyang (to Hebei Elite) |
| - | MF | CHN | Hao Boyu (to Sichuan Jiuniu) |

=== Henan Jianye ===
In:

| No. | Pos. | Nation | Player |
|---|---|---|---|
| 4 | DF | CHN | Han Xuan (from Beijing Renhe) |
| 8 | FW | POR | Orlando Sá (from (Belgium) Standard Liège) |
| 14 | DF | ESP | Cala (from (Spain) Getafe) |
| 18 | MF | CHN | Yang Guoyuan (from Zhejiang Greentown) |
| 20 | MF | CHN | Shirmemet Ali (from (Portugal) Gondomar) |
| 28 | MF | CHN | Ma Xingyu (from Qingdao Huanghai) |
| 31 | MF | CHN | Gu Wenxiang (from Meizhou Meixian Techand) |
| 35 | MF | CHN | Li Benjian (Free Agent) |
| 41 | FW | CHN | Han Zixuan (from Chongqing Lifan) |
| 43 | GK | CHN | Pan Qihao (from (Denmark) Vejle BK) |
| 48 | DF | CHN | Dai Yuhan (from Yunnan Flying Tigers) |
| 50 | DF | CHN | Chen Chengye (from Baotou Nanjiao) |
| 56 | DF | CHN | Huang Junjun (from Sichuan Jiuniu) |
| 59 | FW | CHN | Jia Yinbo (from Qingdao Huanghai) |

Out:

| No. | Pos. | Nation | Player |
|---|---|---|---|
| 3 | DF | SYR | Ahmad Al Salih (Released) |
| 4 | DF | GNB | Eddi Gomes (loan to (Iceland) FH) |
| 7 | FW | CHN | Hu Jinghang (loan return to Shanghai SIPG) |
| 8 | MF | CZE | Bořek Dočkal (loan to (United States) Philadelphia Union) |
| 9 | FW | PHI | Javier Patiño (to (Thailand) Buriram United) |
| 14 | MF | CHN | Feng Gang (loan return to Hangzhou Greentown) |
| 19 | DF | CHN | Zhang Ke (Released) |
| 28 | MF | CHN | Yuan Ye (to Hebei Elite) |
| 39 | FW | CHN | Chen Zijie (loan to Shenyang Urban) |
| 48 | FW | CHN | Zhou Xuezhong (to Jiangxi Liansheng) |
| 49 | DF | CHN | Luo Heng (loan to Hebei Elite) |

=== Jiangsu Suning ===
In:

| No. | Pos. | Nation | Player |
|---|---|---|---|
| 3 | DF | CHN | Tian Yinong (from Yanbian Funde) |
| 18 | MF | CHN | Zhang Lingfeng (from (Portugal) Torreense) |
| 20 | MF | CHN | Abduhamit Abdugheni (from Xinjiang Tianshan Leopard) |
| 29 | DF | ITA | Gabriel Paletta (from (Italy) A.C. Milan) |
| 38 | FW | GHA | Richmond Boakye (from (Serbia) Red Star Belgrade) |
| - | MF | CHN | Cao Kang (loan return from Heilongjiang Lava Spring) |

Out:

| No. | Pos. | Nation | Player |
|---|---|---|---|
| 6 | DF | AUS | Trent Sainsbury (loan to (Switzerland) Grasshopper) |
| 9 | MF | COL | Roger Martínez (loan to (Spain) Villarreal) |
| 15 | MF | CHN | Cao Kang (to Heilongjiang Lava Spring) |
| 18 | DF | CHN | Liu Wei (to Nantong Zhiyun) |
| 26 | DF | KOR | Hong Jeong-ho (loan to (South Korea) Jeonbuk Hyundai Motors) |
| 29 | MF | CHN | Chen Ji (loan to Guizhou Hengfeng) |
| 30 | GK | CHN | Zhang Sipeng (to Guizhou Hengfeng) |
| 31 | FW | CHN | Gao Di (loan return to Shanghai Shenhua) |
| 38 | FW | CMR | Benjamin Moukandjo (loan to Beijing Renhe) |
| 42 | DF | CHN | Li Shizhou (loan to Zhejiang Yiteng) |
| 46 | MF | CHN | Yu Tengteng (to Baoding Yingli Yitong) |
| - | DF | CHN | Gan Qiu (to Shanghai Sunfun) |
| - | MF | CHN | Qin Yifan (to Shanghai Sunfun) |
| - | DF | CHN | Zhu Zhongquan (to Shanghai Sunfun) |

=== Shandong Luneng Taishan ===
In:

| No. | Pos. | Nation | Player |
|---|---|---|---|
| 28 | DF | CHN | Yao Junsheng (loan return from Meizhou Hakka) |
| 41 | MF | CHN | Zhang Chen (loan return from Shenzhen F.C.) |
| - | MF | CHN | Chen Kerui (loan return from Baoding Yingli Yitong) |
| - | FW | CHN | Bai Tianci (loan return from Shanghai Shenxin) |
| - | MF | BRA | Jucilei (loan return from (Brazil) São Paulo) |
| - | FW | CHN | Yang Xu (loan return from Liaoning F.C.) |

Out:

| No. | Pos. | Nation | Player |
|---|---|---|---|
| 26 | MF | CHN | Cui Wei (loan to Meizhou Hakka) |
| 31 | MF | CHN | Wei Jingzong (loan return to (Portugal) Felgueiras) |
| 39 | MF | CHN | Jiang Jiajun (to Chongqing Dangdai Lifan) |
| 42 | MF | CHN | Chen Kerui (loan to Meizhou Hakka) |
| 43 | FW | CHN | Bai Tianci (loan to Meizhou Meixian Techand) |
| 54 | DF | CHN | Song Hua (to Zibo Sunday) |
| 59 | MF | CHN | Yang Yilin (loan to (Spain) FC Jumilla) |
| 60 | DF | CHN | Xia Xicheng (to Zibo Sunday) |
| - | DF | CHN | Chen Guoliang (loan to (Spain) FC Jumilla) |
| - | DF | CHN | Liao Lei (loan to (Spain) FC Jumilla) |
| - | GK | CHN | Sun Qihang (loan to Zibo Sunday) |
| - | MF | BRA | Jucilei (to (Brazil) São Paulo) |
| - | FW | CHN | Yang Xu (to Tianjin Quanjian) |

=== Shanghai Greenland Shenhua ===
In:

| No. | Pos. | Nation | Player |
|---|---|---|---|
| 2 | DF | CHN | Xu Yougang (loan return from Qingdao Huanghai) |
| 11 | MF | PAR | Óscar Romero (loan return from (Spain) Deportivo Alavés) |
| 18 | FW | CHN | Gao Di (loan return from Jiangsu Suning) |
| 19 | DF | CHN | Li Xiaoming (loan return from Shenzhen F.C.) |
| 20 | MF | CHN | Wang Yun (loan return from Shanghai Shenxin) |
| 24 | DF | CHN | Rong Hao (loan from Guangzhou Evergrande Taobao) |
| 32 | DF | CHN | Eddy Francis (from (Portugal) Boavista) |
| 41 | MF | CHN | Li Lianxiang (loan return from Shanghai JuJu Sports) |
| 42 | DF | CHN | Gong Jinshuai (loan return from Shanghai Sunfun) |
| 43 | MF | CHN | Xu Jun (loan return from Shanghai JuJu Sports) |
| 44 | FW | CHN | Gao Shipeng (loan return from Shanghai JuJu Sports) |
| 45 | MF | CHN | Yang Haofeng (loan return from Shanghai JuJu Sports) |
| 49 | MF | CHN | Yan Xinyu (loan return from Shanghai JuJu Sports) |
| 51 | MF | CHN | Zhan Yilin (loan return from Shanghai JuJu Sports) |
| 52 | DF | CHN | Deng Biao (loan return from Shanghai JuJu Sports) |
| 56 | DF | CHN | Cao Chuanyu (loan return from Shanghai JuJu Sports) |
| 58 | DF | CHN | Leng Shiao (loan return from Guizhou Hengfeng) |
| - | FW | CHN | Wu Changqi (loan return from Shanghai Sunfun) |
| - | GK | CHN | Bai Shuo (loan return from Shanghai JuJu Sports) |
| - | DF | CHN | Cao Dong (loan return from Chongqing Dangdai Lifan) |
| - | DF | CHN | Zhou Jiahao (loan return from Shanghai JuJu Sports) |
| - | DF | CHN | Zheng Kaimu (loan return from Shijiazhuang Ever Bright) |
| - | MF | CHN | Deng Zhuoxiang (loan return from Qingdao Huanghai) |
| - | MF | CHN | Wang Fei (loan return from Shanghai JuJu Sports) |

Out:

| No. | Pos. | Nation | Player |
|---|---|---|---|
| 2 | DF | CHN | Xiong Fei (to Liaoning FC) |
| 4 | DF | KOR | Kim Kee-hee (to (United States) Seattle Sounders FC) |
| 5 | MF | CHN | Wang Shouting (loan to Shanghai Shenxin) |
| 9 | FW | SEN | Demba Ba (to (Turkey) Göztepe) |
| 11 | FW | CHN | Lü Zheng (to Beijing Enterprises) |
| 29 | MF | CHN | Xu Junmin (to Shanghai Shenxin) |
| 32 | FW | ARG | Carlos Tevez (to (Argentina) Boca Juniors) |
| 33 | MF | CHN | Liu Jiawei (loan to Xinjiang Tianshan Leopard) |
| 41 | DF | CHN | Cheng Rui (to Qingdao Huanghai) |
| 48 | MF | CHN | Liao Zhilue (to Meixian Techand) |
| 51 | DF | HKG | Brian Fok (loan to (Uruguay) Juventud) |
| 52 | MF | CHN | Zhang Yuhao (loan to Baotou Nanjiao) |
| 53 | MF | CHN | Cui Qi (loan to Baotou Nanjiao) |
| - | DF | CHN | Tang Qiheng (to Shanghai Sunfun) |
| - | GK | CHN | Bai Shuo (to Baotou Nanjiao) |
| - | DF | CHN | Cao Dong (to Chongqing Dangdai Lifan) |
| - | DF | CHN | Zhou Jiahao (to Shijiazhuang Ever Bright) |
| - | DF | CHN | Zheng Kaimu (to Guizhou Hengfeng) |
| - | MF | CHN | Deng Zhuoxiang (to Beijing Enterprises) |
| - | MF | CHN | Wang Fei (to Qingdao Huanghai) |

=== Shanghai SIPG ===
In:

| No. | Pos. | Nation | Player |
|---|---|---|---|
| 19 | FW | CHN | Hu Jinghang (loan return from Henan Jianye) |
| 39 | MF | CHN | Sun Jungang (loan return from (Japan) Giravanz Kitakyushu) |
| 54 | DF | CHN | Yang Fan (loan return from (Japan) Grulla Morioka) |
| 57 | FW | CHN | Zhu Zhengrong (loan return from Suzhou Dongwu) |
| 60 | DF | CHN | Yang Shiyuan (loan return from Yanbian Funde) |
| - | FW | CHN | Li Haowen (loan return from Suzhou Dongwu) |
| - | MF | CHN | Zhu Zhengyu (loan return from Nei Mongol Zhongyou) |
| - | MF | ARG | Darío Conca (loan return from (Brazil) Flamengo) |

Out:

| No. | Pos. | Nation | Player |
|---|---|---|---|
| 5 | MF | CHN | Wang Jiajie (loan to Shanghai Shenxin) |
| 16 | DF | POR | Ricardo Carvalho (Released) |
| 29 | MF | CHN | Zheng Zhiyun (loan to Qingdao Huanghai) |
| 33 | MF | CHN | Wei Shihao (loan return to (Portugal) Leixões) |
| 54 | DF | CHN | Yang Fan (loan to Suzhou Dongwu) |
| 57 | FW | CHN | Zhu Zhengrong (loan to Nantong Zhiyun) |
| 60 | DF | CHN | Yang Shiyuan (loan to Suzhou Dongwu) |
| - | MF | CHN | Liu Guobo (to Beijing Sinobo Guoan) |
| - | MF | CHN | Zhu Zhengyu (to Guizhou Hengfeng) |
| - | MF | ARG | Darío Conca (Released) |

=== Tianjin Quanjian ===
In:

| No. | Pos. | Nation | Player |
|---|---|---|---|
| 2 | MF | CHN | Wu Wei (from Zhejiang Greentown) |
| 9 | FW | CHN | Yang Xu (from Shandong Luneng) |
| 15 | MF | CHN | Liu Yue (from Zhejiang Yiteng) |
| 26 | MF | CHN | Liu Yi (from Zhejiang Greentown) |
| 30 | MF | CHN | Song Boxuan (from Beijing Sinobo Guoan) |
| 31 | DF | CHN | Wen Junjie (from Zhejiang Greentown) |
| 37 | MF | CHN | Wu Lei (from (Portugal) Coimbrões) |
| 57 | DF | CHN | Zulpikar Dolqun (from Xinjiang Tianshan Leopard) |
| - | FW | CHN | Zhang Shuo (loan return from Jiangsu Yancheng Dingli) |

Out:

| No. | Pos. | Nation | Player |
|---|---|---|---|
| 2 | DF | CHN | Liu Sheng (to Meizhou Meixian Techand) |
| 5 | DF | CHN | Yang Shanping (loan to Dalian Yifang) |
| 15 | DF | HKG | Jean-Jacques Kilama (to Hong Kong Pegasus) |
| 18 | GK | CHN | Zhang Jin (to Jiangsu Yancheng Dingli) |
| 20 | MF | CHN | Zhang Yuan (loan to Guizhou Hengfeng) |
| 29 | MF | CHN | Li Xingcan (to Zhejiang Greentown) |
| 47 | FW | CHN | Liu Xuanchen (to Xinjiang Tianshan Leopard) |
| 51 | GK | CHN | Shi Meng (Retired) |
| - | FW | CHN | Zhang Shuo (Released) |

=== Tianjin Teda ===
In:

| No. | Pos. | Nation | Player |
|---|---|---|---|
| 4 | DF | CHN | Yang Fan (from Jiangsu Yancheng Dingli) |
| 7 | FW | GHA | Frank Acheampong (from (Belgium) Anderlecht) |
| 9 | FW | BRA | Johnathan (from (South Korea) Suwon Samsung Bluewings) |
| 14 | MF | CHN | Liu Yaoxin (loan return from (Portugal) Gondomar) |
| 15 | DF | GER | Felix Bastians (from (Germany) VfL Bochum) |
| 16 | DF | CHN | Peng Rui (from Chengdu Qbao) |
| 18 | FW | CHN | Zhou Liao (loan return from Yinchuan Helanshan) |
| 23 | MF | CHN | Yang Wanshun (from Guangzhou R&F) |
| 27 | FW | CHN | Xie Weijun (from Guangzhou Evergrande) |
| 31 | FW | CHN | Sun Ya (from Beijing Renhe) |
| - | GK | CHN | Guo Jiawei (loan return from Meizhou Hakka) |
| - | FW | GAB | Malick Evouna (loan return from (Turkey) Konyaspor) |
| - | FW | COL | Fredy Montero (loan return from (Canada) Vancouver Whitecaps FC) |
| - | DF | CHN | Yang Zexiang (loan return from Baoding Yingli Yitong) |
| - | FW | CHN | Li Zhibin (loan return from Shenyang Urban) |

Out:

| No. | Pos. | Nation | Player |
|---|---|---|---|
| 6 | MF | CHN | Wang Dong (loan to Qingdao Huanghai) |
| 7 | FW | GHA | Frank Acheampong (loan return to (Belgium) Anderlecht) |
| 8 | MF | CHN | Hu Rentian (to Hebei China Fortune) |
| 9 | FW | SEN | Mbaye Diagne (to (Turkey) Kasımpaşa) |
| 13 | MF | CHN | Wang Qiuming (to Hebei China Fortune) |
| 14 | DF | KOR | Hwang Seok-ho (to (Japan) Shimizu S-Pulse) |
| 16 | MF | CHN | Guo Yi (loan to Meizhou Hakka) |
| 20 | FW | CHN | Yang Liyu (loan return to (Portugal) Gondomar) |
| 23 | DF | CHN | Nie Tao (to Beijing Enterprises) |
| 27 | MF | SRB | Nemanja Gudelj (to Guangzhou Evergrande Taobao) |
| 30 | GK | CHN | Li Zheng (loan return to (Portugal) Gondomar) |
| 32 | FW | CHN | Lei Yongchi (loan to Liaoning F.C.) |
| 33 | MF | CHN | Zhou Tong (to Wuhan Zall) |
| 39 | FW | NGA | Brown Ideye (loan to (Spain) Málaga) |
| 50 | MF | CHN | Chen Zitong (to Shijiazhuang Ever Bright) |
| - | FW | COL | Fredy Montero (to (Portugal) Sporting CP) |
| - | DF | CHN | Yang Zexiang (to Dalian Transcendence) |
| - | FW | CHN | Li Zhibin (to Shenyang Urban) |

== League One ==
=== Beijing Enterprises ===
In:

| No. | Pos. | Nation | Player |
|---|---|---|---|
| 1 | GK | CHN | Wang Zixiang (loan from (Spain) Granada CF) |
| 5 | DF | CHN | Nie Tao (from Tianjin Teda) |
| 7 | MF | CHN | Lü Zheng (from Shanghai Greenland Shenhua) |
| 11 | FW | CIV | Gerard Gohou (from (Kazakhstan) FC Kairat) |
| 13 | MF | CHN | Deng Zhuoxiang (from Shanghai Greenland Shenhua) |
| 17 | DF | CHN | Fan Lingjiang (from Qingdao Huanghai) |
| 31 | FW | NGA | Dominic Vinicius (from (Denmark) Vejle BK) |
| 32 | MF | CHN | Han Yi (loan return from Hunan Billows) |
| 34 | DF | CHN | Zhuang Jiade (from Meizhou Meixian Techand) |
| 42 | FW | CHN | Xu Yihai (loan return from Qingdao Jonoon) |
| 45 | DF | CHN | Huang Tao (from Beijing Sinobo Guoan) |
| 51 | MF | CHN | He Yuan (from Beijing Sinobo Guoan) |
| - | FW | CHN | Gong Zheng (loan return from Beijing BIT) |

Out:

| No. | Pos. | Nation | Player |
|---|---|---|---|
| 1 | GK | CHN | Dong Lei (to Taizhou Yuanda) |
| 5 | MF | CHN | Tang Jiashu (to Chongqing Dangdai Lifan) |
| 6 | MF | CHN | Wang Changqing (Retired) |
| 7 | FW | CHN | Jin Hui (to Beijing Renhe) |
| 9 | FW | AUT | Rubin Okotie (to (Belgium) Beerschot Wilrijk) |
| 11 | FW | NGA | Victor Anichebe (Released) |
| 14 | FW | NGA | Leke James (Released) |
| 17 | DF | CHN | Xu Dong (to Heilongjiang Lava Spring) |
| 32 | DF | CHN | Wang Cun (Retired) |
| 45 | DF | CHN | Wang Zihao (to Yinchuan Helanshan) |
| 54 | FW | CHN | Su Jianhu (to Heilongjiang Lava Spring) |
| 58 | DF | CHN | Zhu Xiaojian (to Qingdao Jonoon) |
| 65 | DF | CHN | Qin Cheng (loan return to (Portugal) Torreense) |
| 69 | DF | CHN | Wu Shaocong (to (Japan) Shimizu S-Pulse) |
| - | FW | CHN | Gong Zheng (loan to Beijing BIT) |

=== Dalian Transcendence ===
In:

| No. | Pos. | Nation | Player |
|---|---|---|---|
| 6 | MF | CHN | Meng Yang (loan from Shijiazhuang Ever Bright) |
| 7 | DF | CHN | Yang Zexiang (from Tianjin Teda) |
| 9 | FW | CMR | Yves Ekwalla Herman (from Xinjiang Tianshan Leopard) |
| 10 | FW | BRA | Rafael Silva (from (Brazil) Bragantino) |
| 19 | DF | CHN | Liu Tianqi (from Beijing Renhe) |
| 22 | GK | CHN | Liu Yipeng (from Dalian Yifang) |
| 23 | MF | CHN | Yin Lu (from Nei Mongol Zhongyou) |
| 27 | MF | CHN | Li Geng (loan from Guangzhou Evergrande Taobao) |
| 55 | MF | CHN | Tian Lianbin (from Dalian Yifang) |

Out:

| No. | Pos. | Nation | Player |
|---|---|---|---|
| 5 | MF | CHN | Xue Ya'nan (to Changchun Yatai) |
| 6 | FW | CHN | Yang Fangzhi (loan return to Dalian Yifang) |
| 8 | MF | CHN | Jing Deyang (to Beijing BIT) |
| 9 | FW | BIH | Ivan Božić (Released) |
| 15 | MF | CHN | Ötkür Hesen (to Yinchuan Helanshan) |
| 16 | DF | SWE | David Fällman (to (Sweden) Hammarby) |
| 19 | DF | CHN | Zheng Jianfeng (to Dalian Yifang) |
| 30 | DF | CHN | Liu Yusheng (to Fujian Tianxin) |

=== Heilongjiang Lava Spring ===
In:

| No. | Pos. | Nation | Player |
|---|---|---|---|
| 1 | GK | CHN | Lu Ning (from Beijing Renhe) |
| 7 | FW | KEN | Ayub Masika (loan from Beijing Renhe) |
| 8 | MF | CHN | Zhao Wei (from Shenzhen Ledman) |
| 9 | FW | SEN | Babacar Gueye (from Xinjiang Tianshan Leopard) |
| 18 | FW | CHN | Fan Bojian (loan from Beijing Renhe) |
| 19 | DF | CHN | Xu Dong (from Beijing Enterprises) |
| 20 | DF | CHN | Hu Jing (from Beijing Renhe) |
| 25 | MF | CHN | Cao Kang (from Jiangsu Suning) |
| 31 | MF | CHN | Bai Zijian (from Shenyang Dongjin) |
| 32 | DF | CHN | Mao Kaiyu (from Nei Mongol Zhongyou) |
| 35 | MF | BRA | Victor Bolt (from (Brazil) Goiás) |
| 37 | FW | CHN | Yang Yihu (loan from Beijing Renhe) |
| 50 | MF | CHN | Jiang Yu (from Beijing Renhe) |
| 52 | DF | CHN | He Xi (from Beijing Renhe) |
| 53 | MF | CHN | Huang Jun (from Beijing Renhe) |
| 56 | FW | CHN | Xiang Ben (from Beijing Renhe) |
| 58 | FW | CHN | Su Jianhu (from Beijing Enterprises) |

Out:

| No. | Pos. | Nation | Player |
|---|---|---|---|
| 1 | GK | CHN | Dang Zhao (Retired) |
| 8 | FW | CHN | Zhang Chengxiang (Released) |
| 9 | MF | CHN | Zhao Wei (loan return to Shenzhen Ledman) |
| 18 | DF | CHN | Li Xiaoting (loan return to Changchun Yatai) |
| 25 | MF | CHN | Cao Kang (loan return to Jiangsu Suning) |
| 26 | DF | CHN | Liu Haidong (loan return to Guangzhou Evergrande) |
| 39 | DF | CHN | Ding Wei (Retired) |

=== Liaoning FC ===
In:

| No. | Pos. | Nation | Player |
|---|---|---|---|
| 1 | GK | CHN | Guo Chunquan (from Zhejiang Yiteng) |
| 2 | DF | CHN | Xiong Fei (from Shanghai Greenland Shenhua) |
| 9 | FW | CHN | Feng Boyuan (loan return from (Croatia) NK Rudeš) |
| 11 | FW | ZAM | Jacob Mulenga (from Shijiazhuang Ever Bright) |
| 23 | FW | CHN | Lei Yongchi (loan from Tianjin Teda) |
| 24 | MF | CHN | Liu Xiaodong (from Baoding Yingli Yitong) |
| 26 | DF | HKG | Andy Russell (from (Hong Kong) Tai Po) |
| 29 | DF | CHN | Li Zhen (from Dalian Yifang) |
| 52 | FW | CHN | Feng Hanyuan (from Hebei China Fortune) |
| - | DF | CHN | Zhang Tianlong (loan return from Nei Mongol Zhongyou) |

Out:

| No. | Pos. | Nation | Player |
|---|---|---|---|
| 5 | DF | CHN | Lang Zheng (loan return to Hebei China Fortune) |
| 6 | MF | CHN | Yang Yu (to Qingdao Huanghai) |
| 9 | FW | NGA | Anthony Ujah (to (Germany) Mainz 05) |
| 11 | MF | CHN | Hu Yanqiang (to Beijing Sinobo Guoan) |
| 17 | MF | CHN | Wang Liang (to Dalian Yifang) |
| 18 | FW | CHN | Yang Xu (loan return to Shandong Luneng) |
| 39 | FW | CMR | Olivier Boumal (to (Japan) Yokohama F. Marinos) |
| 40 | FW | CMR | Christian Bekamenga (to (Turkey) Erzurumspor) |
| 42 | MF | CHN | Ma Haoran (loan to Baoding Yingli Yitong) |
| 44 | GK | CHN | Li Zhen (loan to Anhui Hefei Guiguan) |
| 47 | MF | CHN | Yang Lianfeng (loan to Anhui Hefei Guiguan) |
| 53 | DF | CHN | Chen Fubang (loan to Anhui Hefei Guiguan) |
| 54 | GK | CHN | Huang Hongbo (to Nantong Zhiyun) |
| 59 | DF | CHN | Luo Wei (to (South Korea) FC Uijeongbu) |
| - | MF | CHN | He Yaqi (to Yunnan Flying Tigers) |
| - | DF | CHN | Zhang Tianlong (to Nei Mongol Zhongyou) |

=== Meizhou Hakka ===
In:

| No. | Pos. | Nation | Player |
|---|---|---|---|
| 1 | GK | CHN | Li Zheng (from (Portugal) Gondomar) |
| 2 | DF | HKG | Tsui Wang Kit (from Hong Kong Rangers) |
| 3 | DF | CHN | Wang Weilong (loan from Shenzhen F.C.) |
| 7 | MF | CHN | Guo Yi (loan from Tianjin Teda) |
| 9 | MF | CHN | Chen Kerui (loan from Shandong Luneng Taishan) |
| 10 | MF | CHN | Cui Wei (loan from Shandong Luneng) |
| 12 | FW | CMR | John Mary (from (Slovenia) Rudar Velenje) |
| 14 | MF | CHN | Wang Pan (from Yunnan Flying Tigers) |
| 15 | MF | NGA | Izunna Uzochukwu (from (Denmark) OB) |
| 25 | MF | CHN | Fan Jinrui (loan from (Portugal) Gondomar) |
| 42 | DF | CHN | Xiong Zexuan (from Yanbian Beiguo) |
| 46 | GK | CHN | Li Xinyu (from Dalian Yifang) |
| 47 | MF | CHN | Chi Zhongjie (from Yanbian Funde) |
| - | MF | CHN | Tang Shi (loan return from Beijing Sinobo Guoan) |

Out:

| No. | Pos. | Nation | Player |
|---|---|---|---|
| 3 | DF | SLE | Gibril Sankoh (Released) |
| 9 | FW | BRA | Japa (Retired) |
| 12 | DF | CHN | Yao Junsheng (loan return to Shandong Luneng) |
| 16 | MF | CHN | Guo Jing (loan return to Guangzhou Evergrande) |
| 17 | FW | TPE | Onur Dogan (Released) |
| 20 | DF | CHN | Ye Shuwen (to Shenzhen Pengcheng) |
| 25 | GK | CHN | Guo Jiawei (loan return to Tianjin TEDA) |
| 30 | GK | CHN | Luo Zuqing (loan to Shenzhen Pengcheng) |
| - | MF | CHN | Tang Shi (to Guangzhou Evergrande Taobao) |

=== Meizhou Meixian Techand ===
In:

| No. | Pos. | Nation | Player |
|---|---|---|---|
| 3 | DF | CHN | Liu Sheng (from Tianjin Quanjian) |
| 4 | DF | ESP | Raúl Rodríguez (from Shanghai Shenxin) |
| 8 | FW | BRA | Aloísio (from Hebei China Fortune) |
| 10 | FW | BRA | Muriqui (from Guangzhou Evergrande Taobao) |
| 11 | FW | CHN | Bai Tianci (loan from Shandong Luneng Taishan) |
| 17 | MF | CHN | Huang Yuanqiang (from Guangzhou Evergrande Taobao) |
| 21 | MF | CHN | Han Xu (from Dalian Yifang) |
| 27 | GK | CHN | Fang Jingqi (from Guangzhou Evergrande Taobao) |
| 30 | DF | CHN | Shi Jiwei (from Nei Mongol Zhongyou) |
| 31 | FW | CHN | Zeng Chao (from Guangzhou R&F) |
| 39 | MF | CHN | Wu Guichao (from Beijing Sinobo Guoan) |
| 42 | MF | CHN | Yu Wenhe (from Nei Mongol Zhongyou) |
| 45 | MF | CHN | Liao Zhilue (from Shanghai Shenhua) |
| 57 | FW | CHN | Zheng Zezhou (from Shenzhen F.C.) |
| - | DF | BRA | Victor Ramos (from (Brazil) Chapecoense) |

Out:

| No. | Pos. | Nation | Player |
|---|---|---|---|
| 8 | MF | CHN | Zhang Jie (Released) |
| 10 | FW | CHN | Hou Zhe (to Baoding Yingli Yitong) |
| 11 | MF | CHN | Zhang Xingbo (to Shenyang Urban) |
| 17 | FW | CHN | Gu Wenxiang (to Henan Jianye) |
| 21 | DF | CHN | Wang Xingqiang (to Baoding Yingli Yitong) |
| 29 | DF | CHN | Zhuang Jiade (to Beijing Enterprises) |
| - | DF | BRA | Victor Ramos (Released) |

=== Nei Mongol Zhongyou ===
In:

| No. | Pos. | Nation | Player |
|---|---|---|---|
| 1 | GK | CHN | Fang Zihong (loan from Guangzhou Evergrande Taobao) |
| 3 | DF | CHN | Chen Fangzhou (from Yunnan Flying Tigers) |
| 5 | DF | CHN | Li Chenguang (loan return from Shaanxi Chang'an Athletic) |
| 6 | DF | CHN | Liu Ruicheng (loan from Guangzhou Evergrande Taobao) |
| 11 | MF | CHN | Exmetjan Ekber (from Yanbian Funde) |
| 21 | DF | ESP | Martí Crespí (from Qingdao Huanghai) |
| 22 | FW | CHN | Qiu Lingfeng (from Hunan Billows) |
| 25 | DF | CHN | Zhang Tianlong (from Liaoning Whowin) |
| 31 | FW | CHN | Yu Shuai (from Shenzhen F.C.) |
| 33 | DF | CHN | Li Jian (from Zhejiang Yiteng) |
| 37 | MF | CHN | Gao Zengxiang (from Shijiazhuang Ever Bright) |
| 48 | DF | CHN | Wang Zhenxiang (from Shanghai JuJu Sports) |
| 49 | MF | CHN | Wang Haozhi (from Hunan Billows) |

Out:

| No. | Pos. | Nation | Player |
|---|---|---|---|
| 3 | DF | CHN | Luo Hao (to Chongqing Dangdai Lifan) |
| 5 | DF | CHN | Shi Jiwei (to Meizhou Meixian Techand) |
| 8 | MF | CHN | Quan Lei (to Shenyang Urban) |
| 11 | MF | CHN | Nizamdin Afanti (to Beijing Renhe) |
| 12 | MF | BRA | Davi (to (Brazil) Joinville) |
| 14 | MF | CHN | Yu Wenhe (to Meixian Techand) |
| 21 | MF | CHN | Zhu Zhengyu (loan return to Shanghai SIPG) |
| 23 | MF | CHN | Yin Lu (to Dalian Transcendence) |
| 26 | FW | CHN | Yin Congyao (to Chongqing Dangdai Lifan) |
| 32 | DF | CHN | Mao Kaiyu (to Heilongjiang Lava Spring) |
| 33 | DF | CHN | Zhang Tianlong (loan return to Liaoning Whowin) |
| 39 | GK | CHN | Liu Shibo (loan return to Guangzhou Evergrande) |

=== Qingdao Huanghai ===
In:

| No. | Pos. | Nation | Player |
|---|---|---|---|
| 3 | MF | CHN | Zheng Zhiyun (loan from Shanghai SIPG) |
| 4 | DF | TPE | Yaki Yen (from Changchun Yatai) |
| 6 | MF | CHN | Wang Dong (loan from Tianjin Teda) |
| 20 | MF | CHN | Wang Fei (from Shanghai Greenland Shenhua) |
| 21 | FW | ESP | Francisco Sandaza (from (Spain) Girona) |
| 26 | DF | CHN | Lin Jianwei (from Guangzhou Evergrande Taobao) |
| 32 | MF | CHN | Yang Yu (from Liaoning F.C.) |
| 38 | DF | CHN | Cheng Rui (from Shanghai Greenland Shenhua) |
| 42 | DF | CHN | Cao Yue (from Chongqing Lifan) |
| 55 | MF | CHN | Shi Hanchen (from Hebei China Fortune) |
| 56 | GK | CHN | Xing Yu (from Guangzhou R&F) |

Out:

| No. | Pos. | Nation | Player |
|---|---|---|---|
| 3 | DF | CHN | Fan Lingjiang (to Beijing Enterprises) |
| 4 | DF | CHN | Xu Yougang (loan return to Shanghai Shenhua) |
| 8 | MF | CHN | Lu Chenghe (to Beijing BIT) |
| 9 | FW | SRB | Đorđe Rakić (to Zhejiang Greentown) |
| 13 | DF | CHN | Duan Yu (to Beijing BIT) |
| 16 | MF | CHN | Deng Zhuoxiang (loan return to Shanghai Shenhua) |
| 21 | DF | ESP | Martí Crespí (to Nei Mongol Zhongyou) |
| 28 | MF | CHN | Ma Xingyu (to Henan Jianye) |
| 33 | FW | HKG | Godfred Karikari (to (Hong Kong) R&F) |
| 38 | FW | CHN | Jia Yinbo (to Henan Jianye) |

=== Shanghai Shenxin ===
In:

| No. | Pos. | Nation | Player |
|---|---|---|---|
| 5 | MF | CHN | Wang Jiajie (loan from Shanghai SIPG) |
| 9 | FW | CHN | Wang Jingbin (loan from Guangzhou Evergrande) |
| 13 | MF | CHN | Wang Shouting (loan from Shanghai Greenland Shenhua) |
| 19 | FW | NGA | John Owoeri (from Baoding Yingli Yitong) |
| 26 | DF | BRA | Johnny (from Yunnan Flying Tigers) |
| 29 | MF | CHN | Xu Junmin (from Shanghai Greenland Shenhua) |

Out:

| No. | Pos. | Nation | Player |
|---|---|---|---|
| 1 | GK | CHN | Zhang Yinuo (to Shijiazhuang Ever Bright) |
| 5 | DF | ESP | Raúl Rodríguez (to Meizhou Meixian Techand) |
| 9 | FW | CHN | Ji Jun (to Nantong Zhiyun) |
| 13 | MF | CHN | Tan Fucheng (loan to Suzhou Dongwu) |
| 21 | DF | CHN | Xu Xiaolong (loan return to Hebei China Fortune) |
| 23 | FW | BRA | Cleiton Silva (to (Thailand) Chiangrai United) |
| 26 | MF | CHN | Li Xinyu (to Wuhan Chufeng Heli) |
| 32 | FW | CHN | Bai Tianci (loan return to Shandong Luneng) |
| 33 | MF | CHN | Wang Yun (loan return to Shanghai Shenhua) |

=== Shenzhen F.C. ===
In:

| No. | Pos. | Nation | Player |
|---|---|---|---|
| 2 | DF | CHN | Wang Tong (Free Agent) |
| 5 | DF | CHN | Xiang Baixu (from Guangzhou R&F) |
| 6 | MF | CHN | Xu Yang (from Chongqing Dangdai Lifan) |
| 8 | MF | CHN | Ye Chugui (loan from Guangzhou R&F) |
| 10 | FW | CMR | Franck Ohandza (from (Croatia) Hajduk Split) |
| 15 | DF | CHN | Ge Zhen (from Hangzhou Greentown) |
| 19 | MF | CHN | Chen Guoqing (from Beijing Renhe) |
| 22 | MF | CHN | Li Jinqing (Free Agent) |
| 23 | GK | CHN | Wei Jian (loan return from (Portugal) Sintrense) |
| 39 | MF | CHN | Gan Chao (from Beijing Renhe) |
| - | FW | CHN | Wei Jingxing (loan return from Shanghai Sunfun) |

Out:

| No. | Pos. | Nation | Player |
|---|---|---|---|
| 2 | DF | CHN | Geng Xiaoshun (to Jiangsu Yancheng Dingli) |
| 5 | MF | CHN | Zhang Chen (loan return to Shandong Luneng) |
| 6 | MF | CHN | Zhang Jiaqi (loan return to Guangzhou Evergrande) |
| 7 | FW | BRA | Rossi (loan to (Brazil) Internacional) |
| 8 | DF | CHN | Du Longquan (to Wuhan Zall) |
| 15 | DF | CHN | Lü Zheng (to Guangzhou Evergrande) |
| 19 | DF | CHN | Li Xiaoming (loan return to Shanghai Shenhua) |
| 22 | MF | CHN | Yang Jiutian (to Hebei Elite) |
| 26 | DF | CHN | Wang Weilong (loan to Meizhou Hakka) |
| 28 | FW | CHN | Yu Shuai (to Nei Mongol Zhongyou) |
| 32 | DF | CHN | Zhang Hongnan (to Hainan Boying) |
| 36 | MF | CHN | Ling Sihao (to Jiangsu Yancheng Dingli) |
| 38 | MF | CHN | Tan Binliang (loan to Nantong Zhiyun) |
| 42 | FW | CHN | Zheng Zezhou (to Meixian Techand) |
| 52 | GK | CHN | Niu Ben (Released) |
| 59 | MF | CHN | Ren Peng (to Zhejiang Yiteng) |
| - | FW | CHN | Wei Jingxing (to Jiangxi Liansheng) |

=== Shijiazhuang Ever Bright ===
In:

| No. | Pos. | Nation | Player |
|---|---|---|---|
| 3 | DF | CHN | Cao Xuan (from Dalian Yifang) |
| 4 | DF | CHN | Zhou Jiahao (from Shanghai Greenland Shenhua) |
| 6 | MF | CHN | Chen Zitong (from Tianjin Teda) |
| 9 | FW | MNE | Alen Melunović (from (Montenegro) Budućnost Podgorica) |
| 11 | MF | CHN | Wang Hongyu (from Beijing Sinobo Guoan) |
| 18 | MF | CHN | Wu Xiaotian (from Guangzhou Evergrande) |
| 19 | MF | CHN | Wei Jingzong (from (Portugal) Felgueiras) |
| 22 | MF | CHN | Zhong Jiyu (from Beijing Sinobo Guoan) |
| 27 | FW | CHN | Liu Ziming (loan return from (Bulgaria) Neftochimic Burgas) |
| 29 | GK | CHN | Zhang Yinuo (from Shanghai Shenxin) |
| 30 | FW | COD | Junior Mapuku (from (Bulgaria) Levski Sofia) |
| - | DF | CHN | Hao Ming (loan return from Suzhou Dongwu) |
| - | MF | CHN | Meng Yang (from Yunnan Flying Tigers) |
| - | DF | CHN | Yue Zhilei (loan return from Beijing BIT) |

Out:

| No. | Pos. | Nation | Player |
|---|---|---|---|
| 3 | MF | CHN | Liu Junpeng (to Taizhou Yuanda) |
| 8 | FW | ZAM | Jacob Mulenga (to Liaoning F.C.) |
| 9 | MF | CHN | Gao Zengxiang (to Nei Mongol Zhongyou) |
| 11 | FW | BRA | Adriano (to (South Korea) Jeonbuk Hyundai Motors) |
| 18 | DF | CHN | Xu Bo (to Shenyang Urban) |
| 19 | DF | CHN | Zheng Kaimu (loan return to Shanghai Shenhua) |
| 20 | DF | CHN | Zhao Chengle (to Zibo Sunday) |
| 22 | GK | CHN | Zhang Hao (to Hainan Boying) |
| 62 | MF | CHN | Wang Zhipeng (to Yunnan Flying Tigers) |
| - | DF | CHN | Guo Wenjian (to Sichuan Jiuniu) |
| - | MF | CHN | Meng Yang (loan to Dalian Transcendence) |
| - | DF | CHN | Yue Zhilei (to Beijing BIT) |

=== Wuhan Zall ===
In:

| No. | Pos. | Nation | Player |
|---|---|---|---|
| 9 | FW | BRA | Rafael Silva (from (Japan) Urawa Red Diamonds) |
| 11 | MF | CHN | Zhou Tong (from Tianjin Teda) |
| 20 | MF | CHN | Li Hang (from Hebei China Fortune) |
| 22 | DF | CHN | Liao Junjian (loan from Hebei China Fortune) |
| 32 | DF | CHN | Du Longquan (from Shenzhen F.C.) |
| 53 | MF | CHN | Zhang Bohao (from Sichuan Longfor) |
| 60 | DF | CHN | Li Yueming (from Hebei Elite) |

Out:

| No. | Pos. | Nation | Player |
|---|---|---|---|
| 16 | MF | CRO | Sammir (Released) |
| 30 | FW | LBR | Sam Johnson (to (Norway) Vålerenga) |

=== Xinjiang Tianshan Leopard ===
In:

| No. | Pos. | Nation | Player |
|---|---|---|---|
| 4 | DF | CHN | Xia Jin (from Chengdu Qianbao) |
| 7 | MF | CHN | Liu Jiawei (loan from Shanghai Greenland Shenhua) |
| 9 | FW | MNE | Petar Orlandić (from (Portugal) C.F. União) |
| 10 | MF | VEN | Jacobo Kouffati (loan from (Ecuador) C.D. Cuenca) |
| 46 | FW | CHN | Liu Xuanchen (from Tianjin Quanjian) |
| 59 | MF | CHN | Xiang Jiachi (from Guangzhou R&F) |
| - | DF | CHN | Li Minghao (from (Portugal) Atlético CP) |

Out:

| No. | Pos. | Nation | Player |
|---|---|---|---|
| 6 | DF | BRA | Vicente (Retired) |
| 9 | FW | CMR | Yves Ekwalla Herman (to Dalian Transcendence) |
| 10 | FW | SEN | Babacar Gueye (to Heilongjiang Lava Spring) |
| 22 | DF | CHN | Yan Zhiyu (to Changchun Yatai) |
| 24 | MF | CHN | Abduhamit Abdugheni (to Jiangsu Suning) |
| 28 | MF | CHN | Ma Bokang (to Hebei China Fortune) |
| 35 | FW | CHN | Shewket Yalqun (loan return to Guangzhou Evergrande) |
| 48 | DF | CHN | Zulpikar Dolqun (to Tianjin Quanjian) |

=== Yanbian Funde ===
In:

| No. | Pos. | Nation | Player |
|---|---|---|---|
| 3 | DF | CHN | Wang Peng (from Dalian Boyoung) |
| 9 | FW | CMR | Raphaël Messi Bouli (from (Cameroon) APEJES) |
| 10 | FW | BRA | Jair (from (South Korea) Jeonnam Dragons) |
| 20 | MF | CHN | Cai Xinyu (Free Agent) |
| 21 | DF | CHN | Wang Meng (from Suzhou Dongwu) |
| 42 | FW | CHN | Gao Wanguo (from Yinchuan Helanshan) |
| - | MF | KOR | Yoon Bit-garam (loan return from (South Korea) Jeju United) |

Out:

| No. | Pos. | Nation | Player |
|---|---|---|---|
| 1 | GK | CHN | Yin Guang (to Yanbian Beiguo) |
| 3 | DF | CHN | Tian Yinong (to Jiangsu Suning) |
| 5 | DF | SRB | Nikola Petković (to (Serbia) FK Zemun) |
| 6 | FW | CHN | Li Xun (to Jilin Baijia) |
| 8 | MF | CHN | Chi Zhongguo (to Beijing Sinobo Guoan) |
| 10 | MF | GAM | Bubacarr Trawally (to (Denmark) Vejle BK) |
| 14 | MF | KOR | Yoon Bit-garam (loan to (South Korea) Sangju Sangmu) |
| 20 | DF | CHN | Yang Shiyuan (loan return to Shanghai SIPG) |
| 21 | DF | CHN | Jin Xian (to Yanbian Beiguo) |
| 22 | GK | CHN | Chi Wenyi (to Beijing Sinobo Guoan) |
| 25 | DF | CHN | Jin Hongyu (to Jilin Baijia) |
| 28 | FW | ALB | Valdet Rama (Released) |
| 29 | MF | CHN | Exmetjan Ekber (to Nei Mongol Zhongyou) |
| 39 | FW | KOR | Hwang Il-su ( (South Korea) Ulsan Hyundai) |
| 58 | MF | CHN | Chi Zhongjie (to Meizhou Hakka) |
| 60 | DF | CHN | Cui Xinlong (to Yanbian Beiguo) |

=== Zhejiang Greentown ===
In:

| No. | Pos. | Nation | Player |
|---|---|---|---|
| 5 | MF | CHN | Fan Baiqun (from Sichuan Longfor) |
| 7 | MF | CHN | Zhu Haiwei (from Hebei China Fortune) |
| 9 | FW | RSA | Dino Ndlovu (from (Azerbaijan) Qarabağ FK) |
| 10 | MF | ESP | Edu García (from (India) Bengaluru) |
| 16 | DF | CHN | Xu Xiaolong (from Hebei China Fortune) |
| 20 | MF | CHN | Zhong Haoran (from (Serbia) Borac Čačak) |
| 29 | MF | CHN | Li Xingcan (from Tianjin Quanjian) |
| 31 | FW | SRB | Đorđe Rakić (from Qingdao Huanghai) |
| 34 | GK | CHN | Zhang Lei (loan return from Yunnan Lijiang) |
| - | MF | CHN | Feng Gang (loan return from Henan Jianye) |

Out:

| No. | Pos. | Nation | Player |
|---|---|---|---|
| 3 | DF | CHN | Ge Zhen (to Shenzhen F.C.) |
| 5 | MF | CHN | Wu Wei (to Tianjin Quanjian) |
| 7 | FW | BRA | Denilson (to (Cyprus) AEL Limassol) |
| 9 | FW | BRA | Anselmo Ramon (to (Brazil) Guarani) |
| 13 | DF | AUS | Matthew Spiranovic (Released) |
| 17 | MF | CHN | Liu Yi (to Tianjin Quanjian) |
| 18 | FW | CHN | Gao Huaze (to Hebei China Fortune) |
| 20 | MF | CHN | Wang Dongsheng (to Fujian Tianxin) |
| 33 | MF | CHN | Chen Zhongliu (to Chongqing Dangdai Lifan) |
| 42 | MF | CHN | Zhuang Jiajie (to Hunan Billows) |
| 44 | GK | CHN | Lai Jinfeng (to Fujian Tianxin) |
| 45 | MF | CHN | Ruan Yang (to Hunan Billows) |
| 47 | DF | CHN | Liu Jing (to Hebei China Fortune) |
| 48 | DF | CHN | Wen Junjie (to Tianjin Quanjian) |
| 49 | MF | CHN | Yang Guoyuan (to Henan Jianye) |
| 53 | MF | CHN | Jin Rui (to Fujian Tianxin) |
| 57 | GK | CHN | Li Yihao (to Hebei Elite) |
| - | MF | CHN | Feng Gang (to Hebei China Fortune) |

=== Zhejiang Yiteng ===
In:

| No. | Pos. | Nation | Player |
|---|---|---|---|
| 6 | DF | CHN | Li Hong (from Changchun Yatai) |
| 7 | MF | BRA | Sérgio Mota (from (Brazil) Luverdense) |
| 18 | FW | CHN | Zhou Bingxu (from Ningbo Yinbo) |
| 27 | DF | CHN | Li Shizhou (loan from Jiangsu Suning) |
| 31 | MF | CHN | Ren Peng (from Shenzhen F.C.) |
| - | MF | CHN | Lü Yongdi (loan return from Jilin Baijia) |
| - | MF | CHN | Li Xin (loan return from Jilin Baijia) |

Out:

| No. | Pos. | Nation | Player |
|---|---|---|---|
| 1 | GK | CHN | Guo Chunquan (to Liaoning F.C.) |
| 7 | FW | NED | Romeo Castelen (to (Netherlands) VVV-Venlo) |
| 9 | MF | CHN | Li Xin (to Jilin Baijia) |
| 15 | MF | CHN | Wu Chen (to Fujian Tianxin) |
| 18 | MF | CHN | Liu Yue (to Tianjin Quanjian) |
| 22 | MF | CHN | Wang Yunlong (to Suzhou Dongwu) |
| 27 | DF | CHN | Li Jian (to Nei Mongol Zhongyou) |
| 29 | FW | ITA | Federico Piovaccari (to (Italy) Ternana) |
| 51 | DF | CHN | Tulajan Turghunjan (to Baotou Nanjiao) |
