= Li Shuai (footballer, born 1995) =

Chinese footballer

Li Shuai 李帅
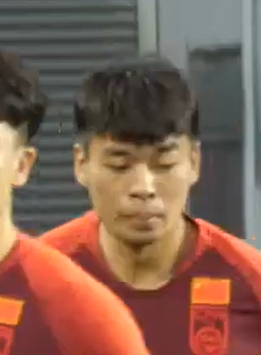

Personal information
- Date of birth: 18 June 1995 (age 31)
- Place of birth: Shenyang, Liaoning, China
- Height: 1.80 m (5 ft 11 in)
- Position: Left-back

Team information
- Current team: Shanghai Port
- Number: 32

Youth career
- 2007–2014: Changchun Yatai
- 2014–2015: Mafra

Senior career*
Years	Team	Apps	(Gls)
2016–2021	Dalian Professional	100	(2)
2022–	Shanghai Port	102	(3)

International career^{‡}
2016–2018	China U-23	20	(0)
2019–	China	2	(0)
- * Club domestic league appearances and goals as of 19 November 2026 ‡ National team caps and goals as of 26 November 2023

Li Shuai (Chinese: 李帅; pinyin: Lǐ Shuài; born 18 June 1995) is a Chinese professional footballer who currently plays as a left-back for Chinese Super League club Shanghai Port and the China national team.

== Club career ==
Li Shuai would play for the Changchun Yatai youth team before continuing with his development with Portuguese club Mafra. On 5 January 2016 he would return to China to join China League One side Dalian Yifang (now known as Dalian Professional). He made his senior debut on 12 March 2016 in a 2–0 home win over Zhejiang Yiteng. On 9 April 2017, he scored his first senior goal in a 2–1 home win against Qingdao Huanghai. He would go on to establish himself as a regular within the team and played in 16 league matches for the club as Dalian Yifang won the 2017 China League One division title and promotion to the first tier at the end of the season.

Li would be linked with fellow top tier clubs Jiangsu Suning, Tianjin Quanjian and Guangzhou Evergrande in the 2018 winter transfer window. However, his former club Changchun Yatai submitted a claim to the Chinese Football Association for his ownership in January 2018 and held back any further transfers. He stayed at Dalian Yifang and made his Chinese Super League debut on 3 March 2018 in an 8–0 crushing defeat against Shanghai SIPG, coming on for Wang Jinxian in the 66th minute. Despite the defeat he would still remain a vital member of the team and go on to score his first first-tier league goal on 14 September 2018 in a 1–0 win over Tianjin Quanjian to secure Dalian's first away victory of the season.

Li's contract with Dalian would come to an end and fellow top tier club Shanghai Port would sign him on a free transfer on 28 July 2022. He would make his debut in a league game on 1 September 2022 against Cangzhou Mighty Lions in a 0-0 draw.

== International career ==
Li was called up to the China national team by Marcello Lippi on 8 September 2019, but did not have his first appearance until the 10 October 2019 match against Guam.

== Career statistics ==
=== Club statistics ===
As of 1 March 2026.

Appearances and goals by club, season and competition
Club	Season	League			National Cup		Continental		Other		Total	
Club	Season	Division	Apps	Goals	Apps	Goals	Apps	Goals	Apps	Goals	Apps	Goals
Dalian Yifang / Dalian Professional	2016	China League One	17	0	2	0	-		-		19	0
Dalian Yifang / Dalian Professional	2017	China League One	16	1	1	0	-		-		17	1
Dalian Yifang / Dalian Professional	2018	Chinese Super League	18	1	3	0	-		-		21	1
Dalian Yifang / Dalian Professional	2019	Chinese Super League	21	0	2	0	-		-		23	0
Dalian Yifang / Dalian Professional	2020	Chinese Super League	11	0	1	0	-		-		12	0
Dalian Yifang / Dalian Professional	2021	Chinese Super League	17	0	0	0	-		2 (Note: Appearance(s) in Promotion/Relegation Play-offs)	0	19	0
Dalian Yifang / Dalian Professional	Total		100	2	9	0	0	0	2	0	111	2
Shanghai Port	2022	Chinese Super League	7	0	3	0	-		-		10	0
Shanghai Port	2023	Chinese Super League	20	0	2	0	1	0	-		23	0
Shanghai Port	2024	Chinese Super League	27	0	4	1	10	0	1 (Note: Appearances in Chinese FA Super Cup)	0	42	1
Shanghai Port	2025	Chinese Super League	25	2	2	0	5	0	1	0	33	2
Shanghai Port	Total		79	2	11	1	16	0	2	0	108	3
Career total			179	4	20	1	16	0	4	0	219	5

=== International statistics ===
National team
Year	Apps	Goals
2019	1	0
2023	1	0
Total	2	0

== Honours ==
Dalian Professional

- China League One: 2017

Shanghai Port

- Chinese Super League: 2023, 2024, 2025
- Chinese FA Cup: 2024
