= Zhu Zhengyu =

Chinese footballer

Personal information
- Full name: Zhu Zhengyu
- Date of birth: 12 January 1995 (age 31)
- Place of birth: Yongjia, Zhejiang, China
- Height: 1.78 m (5 ft 10 in)
- Position: Midfielder

Youth career
- 2006–2008: Shanghai Shenhua
- 2008–2013: Guizhou Renhe
- 2011–2012: → Oeiras (loan)
- 2013: → Sacavenense (loan)
- 2015: Shanghai SIPG

Senior career*
Years	Team	Apps	(Gls)
2014	Taiyuan Zhongyou	9	(2)
2016–2017	Shanghai SIPG	0	(0)
2016	→ BSK Borča (loan)	3	(0)
2017	→ Nei Mongol Zhongyou (loan)	2	(0)
2018–2021	Guizhou Hengfeng	54	(2)
2022-2023	Wuxi Wugou	27	(4)
- * Club domestic league appearances and goals as of 31 December 2022

Zhu Zhengyu (Chinese: 朱征宇; pinyin: Zhū Zhēngyǔ; born 12 January 1995) is a Chinese footballer who plays as a midfielder.

== Club career ==
Zhu Zhengyu joined Shanghai Shenhua's youth academy in 2006 and moved to Shaanxi Renhe (Guizhou Renhe) in 2008. He was sent to Portugal following Chinese Football Association 500.com Stars Project in the end of 2011 and received training with Greater Lisbon clubs Oeiras and Sacavenense successively between 2011 and 2013. He returned to China in 2013 for 2013 National Games of China. Zhu started his professional football career in 2014 when he joined China League Two side Taiyuan Zhongyou Jiayi. He scored two goals in nine appearances as Taiyuan Zhongyou finished the runners-up of the season and won promotion to China League One.

Zhu signed a contract with Chinese Super League side Shanghai SIPG in the summer of 2015. He was promoted to Shanghai's first team squad by Sven-Göran Eriksson in 2016. Zhu was loaned to Serbian First League side BSK Borča in July 2016. He made his debut for BSK Borča on 5 November 2016 in a 1–0 away defeat against Odžaci. On 28 February 2017, Zhu was loaned to League One side Nei Mongol Zhongyou for the 2017 season. On 19 April 2017, he scored his first goal for the club in the second round of 2017 Chinese FA Cup against third-tier club Hebei Elite, which Nei Mongol won 2–0. He won the most valuable player of second round title in the vote. Zhu made a trail with A-League side Newcastle Jets in July 2017.

On 26 February 2018, Zhu transferred to fellow Super League side Guizhou Hengfeng. On 11 March 2018, he made his debut for the club in a 3–2 away loss to Hebei China Fortune, coming on as a substitute for Chen Ji in the 68th minute. He scored his first first-tier goal in the match.

== Career statistics ==
Statistics accurate as of match played 31 December 2022.

Appearances and goals by club, season and competition
Club	Season	League			National Cup		Continental		Other		Total	
Club	Season	Division	Apps	Goals	Apps	Goals	Apps	Goals	Apps	Goals	Apps	Goals
Taiyuan Zhongyou	2014	China League Two	9	2	-		-		-		9	2
Shanghai SIPG	2016	Chinese Super League	0	0	0	0	0	0	-		0	0
BSK Borča (loan)	2016–17	Serbian First League	3	0	0	0	-		-		3	0
Nei Mongol Zhongyou (loan)	2017	China League One	2	0	2	1	-		-		4	1
Guizhou Hengfeng	2018	Chinese Super League	16	1	3	0	-		-		19	1
Guizhou Hengfeng	2019	China League One	9	0	0	0	-		-		9	0
Guizhou Hengfeng	2020	China League One	7	1	0	0	-		-		7	1
Guizhou Hengfeng	2021	China League One	23	0	0	0	-		-		23	0
Guizhou Hengfeng	Total		55	2	3	0	0	0	0	0	58	2
Wuxi Wugou	2022	China League Two	13	4	-		-		-		13	4
Wuxi Wugou	2023	China League One	0	0	0	0	-		-		0	0
Wuxi Wugou	Total		13	4	0	0	0	0	0	0	13	4
Career total			82	8	5	1	0	0	0	0	87	9
