= Du Longquan =

Chinese footballer

Du Longquan 杜龙泉
Personal information
- Date of birth: 29 May 1988 (age 38)
- Place of birth: Dalian, Liaoning, China
- Height: 1.81 m (5 ft 11 1/2 in)
- Position: Left-back

Senior career*
Years	Team	Apps	(Gls)
2007–2011	Dalian Shide	25	(0)
2011	→ Fushun Xinye (loan)	7	(0)
2012–2017	Shenzhen Ruby	134	(1)
2018–2020	Wuhan Zall	4	(0)
Medal record
Representing China
Men's football
AFC U-17 Championship
Gold medal – first place	2004 Japan	Team
- * Club domestic league appearances and goals as of 31 December 2020

Du Longquan (Chinese: 杜龙泉; born 29 May 1988) is a Chinese former football player.

== Club career ==
In 2007, Du Longquan started his professional footballer career with Chinese Super League side Dalian Shide when he was included in their first team squad. He would eventually make his league debut for Dalian on 4 November 2007 against Hangzhou Greentown, coming on as a substitute for Liu Yu in the 46th minute in a game that ended in a 1-1 draw. After several seasons with the club where he was unable to establish himself as a regular within the team and in 2011 he was loaned to China League Two side Fushun Xinye until 31 December.

In March 2012, Du transferred to China League One side Shenzhen Ruby. He would make his debut in a league game on 17 March 2012 against Beijing Baxy in a 1-0 victory. This would be followed by his first goal in the Chinese FA Cup on 1 June 2012 against Harbin Yiteng F.C. in a 2-0 win.

On 13 January 2018, Du transferred to China League One side Wuhan Zall. He would be part of the squad that gained promotion to the top tier with the club when they won the 2018 China League One division.

== Career statistics ==
Statistics accurate as of match played 31 December 2020.

Appearances and goals by club, season and competition
Club	Season	League			National Cup		Continental		Other		Total	
Club	Season	Division	Apps	Goals	Apps	Goals	Apps	Goals	Apps	Goals	Apps	Goals
Dalian Shide	2007	Chinese Super League	3	0	-		-		-		3	0
Dalian Shide	2008	Chinese Super League	14	0	-		-		-		14	0
Dalian Shide	2009	Chinese Super League	0	0	-		-		-		0	0
Dalian Shide	2010	Chinese Super League	8	0	-		-		-		8	0
Dalian Shide	Total		25	0	0	0	0	0	0	0	25	0
Fushun Xinye (loan)	2011	China League Two	7	0	0	0	-		-		7	0
Shenzhen Ruby	2012	China League One	22	0	2	1	-		-		24	1
Shenzhen Ruby	2013	China League One	23	1	1	0	-		-		24	1
Shenzhen Ruby	2014	China League One	23	0	1	0	-		-		24	0
Shenzhen Ruby	2015	China League One	27	0	2	0	-		-		29	0
Shenzhen Ruby	2016	China League One	19	0	0	0	-		-		19	0
Shenzhen Ruby	2017	China League One	20	0	2	0	-		-		22	0
Shenzhen Ruby	Total		134	1	8	1	0	0	0	0	142	2
Wuhan Zall	2018	China League One	4	0	0	0	-		-		4	0
Career total			170	1	8	1	0	0	0	0	176	2

== Honours ==
=== Club ===
Wuhan Zall

- China League One: 2018
