= Chen Zitong =

Chinese association football player

Personal information
- Date of birth: 20 February 1997 (age 29)
- Height: 1.86 m (6 ft 1 in)
- Position: Midfielder

Team information
- Current team: Changchun Xidu

Youth career
- –2017: Tianjin TEDA
- 2018: Shijiazhuang Ever Bright

Senior career*
| Years | Team | Apps | (Gls) |
| 2018–2020 | Shijiazhuang Ever Bright | 12 | (0) |
| 2021 | Zibo Cuju | 27 | (0) |
| 2022–2023 | Zibo Qisheng | 22 | (1) |
| 2024–2026 | Lanzhou Longyuan Athletic | 49 | (0) |
| 2026– | Changchun Xidu | 0 | (0) |
- * Club domestic league appearances and goals as of 22:14, 11 March 2026 (UTC)

Chen Zitong (simplified Chinese: 陈子桐; traditional Chinese: 陳子桐; pinyin: Chén Zitóng; born 27 February 1997) is a Chinese footballer currently playing as a midfielder for China League Two club Changchun Xidu.

== Club career ==
Chen Zitong would be promoted to the senior team of Shijiazhuang Ever Bright in the 2018 China League One campaign and would go on to make his debut on 12 April 2018 in a Chinese FA Cup game against Wuhan Chufeng Heli that ended in a 1–1 draw, but lost in a penalty shootout. He would have to wait until 26 July 2020 to make his league debut in a Chinese Super League game against Hebei China Fortune that ended in a 2–2 draw.

== Career statistics ==
As of 18 August 2024.

| Club | Season | League | | | Cup | | Continental | | Other | | Total | |
| Club | Season | Division | Apps | Goals | Apps | Goals | Apps | Goals | Apps | Goals | Apps | Goals |
|---|---|---|---|---|---|---|---|---|---|---|---|---|
| Shijiazhuang Ever Bright | 2018 | China League One | 0 | 0 | 1 | 0 | – | | – | | 1 | 0 |
| Shijiazhuang Ever Bright | 2019 | China League One | 0 | 0 | 0 | 0 | – | | – | | 0 | 0 |
| Shijiazhuang Ever Bright | 2020 | Chinese Super League | 12 | 0 | 1 | 0 | – | | – | | 13 | 0 |
| Shijiazhuang Ever Bright | Total | | 12 | 0 | 2 | 0 | 0 | 0 | 0 | 0 | 14 | 0 |
| Zibo Cuju | 2021 | China League One | 27 | 0 | 2 | 0 | – | | – | | 29 | 0 |
| Zibo Qisheng | 2022 | China League Two | 10 | 0 | – | | – | | – | | 10 | 0 |
| Zibo Qisheng | 2023 | China League Two | 12 | 1 | 2 | 0 | – | | – | | 14 | 1 |
| Zibo Qisheng | Total | | 22 | 1 | 2 | 0 | 0 | 0 | 0 | 0 | 24 | 1 |
| Rizhao Yuqi | 2024 | China League Two | 15 | 0 | 3 | 0 | – | | – | | 18 | 0 |
| Career total | | | 76 | 1 | 9 | 0 | 0 | 0 | 0 | 0 | 85 | 1 |
