= Yang Yu (footballer) =

Chinese footballer

Yang Yu 杨宇
Personal information
- Date of birth: 18 April 1985 (age 41)
- Place of birth: Shenyang, Liaoning, China
- Height: 1.86 m (6 ft 1 in)
- Position: Midfielder

Youth career
- 2003–2005: Liaoning Young

Senior career*
Years	Team	Apps	(Gls)
2006–2017	Liaoning FC	196	(9)
2018–2021	Qingdao FC	69	(4)
2022	Guangxi Pingguo Haliao	22	(1)
2024	Liaoning Tieren	0	(0)

Managerial career
- 2024–2026: Liaoning Tieren (assistant)
- * Club domestic league appearances and goals as of 7 December 2022

Yang Yu (simplified Chinese: 杨宇; traditional Chinese: 楊宇; pinyin: Yáng Yǔ; born 18 April 1985) is a Chinese football coach and former professional footballer.

== Club career ==
Yang Yu broke into the senior side of Liaoning FC on September 12, 2006, in a league game against Dalian Shide as a late substitute in a 2–1 victory. After making his debut he would become a fringe player within the squad, however he would see enough playing time to score his debut goal against Shandong Luneng in a league game on August 11, 2007 in a 2–1 victory. Often a peripheral member of the squad it was only once Liaoning were relegated at the end of the 2008 league season and playing in the second tier before Yang Yu was given his chance to establish himself within the Liaoning team. Even during the 2009 league season when Liaoning were playing in the second tier Yang Yu would still have to wait to establish himself within the team and only became a vital member for the club during the second half of the season when Liaoning were pushing for the division title and promotion back into the top tier.

On 2 February 2018, Yang transferred to China League One side Qingdao Huanghai. He would make his debut in a league game against Dalian Transcendence on 11 March 2018 in a 4-2 victory. On 8 April 2018, Yang scored his first goal for Qingdao in a 2-1 home win against his former club Liaoning. In his second season at the club Qingdao won the 2019 China League One division and promotion into the top tier.

On 30 January 2024, Yang joined China League One club Liaoning Shenyang Urban.

== Career statistics ==
Statistics accurate as of match played 7 December 2022.

Appearances and goals by club, season and competition
Club	Season	League			National Cup		Continental		Other		Total	
Club	Season	Division	Apps	Goals	Apps	Goals	Apps	Goals	Apps	Goals	Apps	Goals
Liaoning FC	2006	Chinese Super League	2	0	0	0	-		-		2	0
Liaoning FC	2007	Chinese Super League	14	2	-		-		-		14	2
Liaoning FC	2008	Chinese Super League	8	0	-		-		-		8	0
Liaoning FC	2009	China League One	16	1	-		-		-		16	1
Liaoning FC	2010	Chinese Super League	24	2	-		-		-		24	2
Liaoning FC	2011	Chinese Super League	21	0	0	0	-		-		21	0
Liaoning FC	2012	Chinese Super League	24	0	1	0	-		-		25	0
Liaoning FC	2013	Chinese Super League	15	0	1	0	-		-		16	0
Liaoning FC	2014	Chinese Super League	13	1	1	0	-		-		14	1
Liaoning FC	2015	Chinese Super League	8	0	0	0	-		-		8	0
Liaoning FC	2016	Chinese Super League	22	0	2	0	-		-		24	0
Liaoning FC	2017	Chinese Super League	29	3	0	0	-		-		29	3
Liaoning FC	Total		196	9	5	0	0	0	0	0	201	9
Qingdao Huanghai	2018	China League One	26	1	0	0	-		-		26	1
Qingdao Huanghai	2019	China League One	21	3	2	0	-		-		23	3
Qingdao Huanghai	2020	Chinese Super League	10	0	1	0	-		-		11	0
Qingdao Huanghai	2021	Chinese Super League	12	0	1	0	-		-		13	0
Qingdao Huanghai	Total		69	4	4	0	0	0	0	0	73	4
Guangxi Pingguo Haliao	2022	China League One	22	1	0	0	-		-		22	1
Liaoning Shenyang Urban	2024	China League One	0	0	0	0	-		-		0	0
Career total			287	14	9	0	0	0	0	0	296	14

== Honours ==
=== Club ===
Liaoning FC

- China League One: 2009

Qingdao Huanghai

- China League One: 2019
