= Yang Guoyuan =

Chinese association football player

Personal information
- Date of birth: 7 April 1997 (age 29)
- Height: 1.75 m (5 ft 9 in)
- Position: Midfielder

Team information
- Current team: Heilongjiang Ice City

Senior career*
| Years | Team | Apps | (Gls) |
| 2018–2021 | Henan Jianye | 11 | (0) |
| 2022- | Heilongjiang Ice City | 0 | (0) |
- * Club domestic league appearances and goals as of 13:14, 28 April 2022 (UTC)

Yang Guoyuan (simplified Chinese: 杨国元; traditional Chinese: 楊國元; pinyin: Yáng Guóyuán; born 7 April 1997) is a Chinese footballer currently playing as a midfielder for Heilongjiang Ice City.

== Club career ==
Yang Guoyuan was promoted to the senior team of Henan Jianye within the 2018 Chinese Super League season but would have to wait until 3 March 2019 to make his debut in a league game against Dalian Yifang F.C. in a 1-1 draw where he came on as a substitute for Liu Heng.

== Career statistics ==
As of 31 December 2020.

| Club | Season | League | | | Cup | | Continental | | Other | | Total | |
| Club | Season | Division | Apps | Goals | Apps | Goals | Apps | Goals | Apps | Goals | Apps | Goals |
|---|---|---|---|---|---|---|---|---|---|---|---|---|
| Henan Jianye | 2018 | Chinese Super League | 0 | 0 | 0 | 0 | – | | – | | 0 | 0 |
| Henan Jianye | 2019 | Chinese Super League | 8 | 0 | 1 | 0 | – | | – | | 9 | 0 |
| Henan Jianye | Total | | 8 | 0 | 1 | 0 | 0 | 0 | 0 | 0 | 9 | 0 |
| Career total | | | 8 | 0 | 1 | 0 | 0 | 0 | 0 | 0 | 9 | 0 |
