= Jin Xian (footballer) =

Chinese footballer

Jin Xian 김현 金贤
Personal information
- Date of birth: 11 July 1991 (age 35)
- Place of birth: Helong, Jilin, China
- Height: 1.75 m (5 ft 9 in)
- Position: Defender

Team information
- Current team: Yanbian Beiguo
- Number: 2

Senior career*
Years	Team	Apps	(Gls)
2011–2017	Yanbian FC	35	(0)
2018–	Yanbian Beiguo	40	(2)
- * Club domestic league appearances and goals as of 12 October 2019

Jin Xian
- Simplified Chinese: 金贤
Transcriptions
Standard Mandarin
- Hanyu Pinyin: Jīn Xián
- IPA: [tɕín.ɕjɛ̌n]

Chinese Korean name
- Chosŏn'gŭl: 김현
Transcriptions
- Revised Romanization: Gim Hyeon
- McCune–Reischauer: Kim Hyŏn

Jin Xian (Chinese: 金贤; Korean: 김현; born 11 July 1991) is a Chinese footballer who currently plays for China League Two side Yanbian Beiguo.

== Club career ==
Jin Xian started his professional football career in 2011 when he was promoted to Yanbian FC's first squad. On 30 October 2016, Jin made his Super League debut in the first match of 2016 season against Hangzhou Greentown.

On 9 January 2018, Jin transferred to China League Two side Yanbian Beiguo.

== Career statistics ==
Statistics accurate as of match played 12 October 2019.

Club performance			League		Cup		League Cup		Continental		Total	
Season	Club	League	Apps	Goals	Apps	Goals	Apps	Goals	Apps	Goals	Apps	Goals
2011	Yanbian FC	China League One	1	0	0	0	-		-		1	0
2012	Yanbian FC	China League One	0	0	1	0	-		-		1	0
2013	Yanbian FC	China League One	21	0	0	0	-		-		21	0
2014	Yanbian FC	China League One	4	0	2	0	-		-		6	0
2015	Yanbian FC	China League One	6	0	1	0	-		-		7	0
2016	Yanbian FC	Chinese Super League	1	0	1	0	-		-		2	0
2017	Yanbian FC	Chinese Super League	2	0	1	0	-		-		3	0
2018	Yanbian Beiguo	China League Two	13	0	4	0	-		-		17	0
2019	Yanbian Beiguo	China League Two	27	2	1	0	-		-		28	2
Total			75	2	10	0	0	0	0	0	85	2

== Honours ==
Yanbian Changbaishan

- China League One: 2015
