= Hu Jing =

Chinese footballer (born 1998)

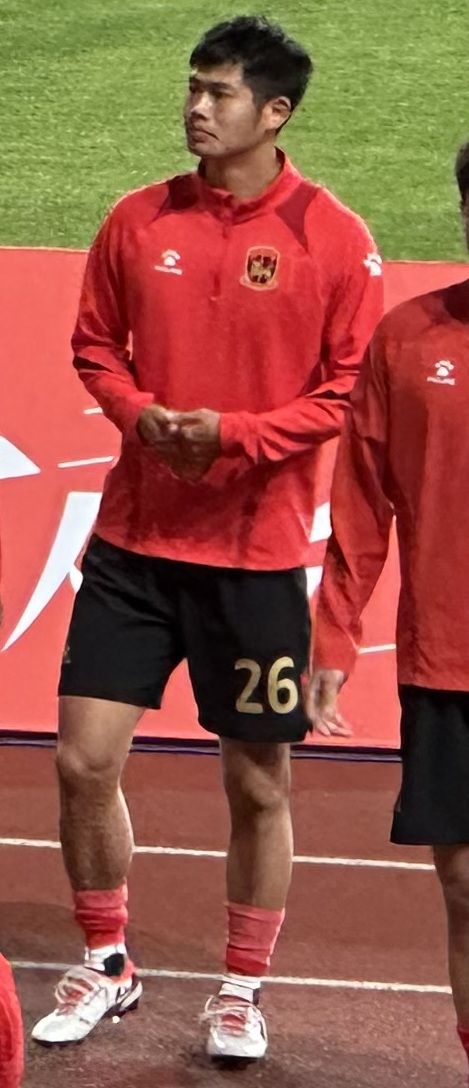
- Hu Jing in May 2025

Personal information
- Full name: Hu Jing
- Date of birth: 23 December 1998 (age 27)
- Place of birth: Nanchong, Sichuan, China
- Height: 1.84 m (6 ft 0 in)
- Position: Centre-back

Youth career
- –2017: Beijing Renhe

Senior career*
Years	Team	Apps	(Gls)
2018–2021	Heilongjiang Ice City	64	(3)
2022–2023	Chengdu Rongcheng	21	(1)
2024	Chongqing Tonglianglong	18	(0)
2025	Suzhou Dongwu	14	(2)
Total		117	(6)
- * Club domestic league appearances and goals

Hu Jing (Chinese: 胡靖; pinyin: Hú Jìng; born 23 December 1998) is a Chinese former professional footballer who played as a centre-back.

A product of the Beijing Renhe youth academy, he began his senior career at Heilongjiang Ice City, and moved to Chengdu Rongcheng. In the latter stages of his career, he played for first Chongqing Tonglianglong and then Suzhou Dongwu. While playing for Suzhou Dongwu, he suffered a cardiac arrest during a match, and has had his career ended prematurely as a direct result.

== Club career ==
=== Heilongjiang Ice City ===
Born in Nanchong, Sichuan, Hu Jing graduated from the Beijing Renhe youth academy. On 1 March 2018, Hu signed for China League One newcomers Heilongjiang Lava Spring. He made his debut for Heilongjiang Lava Spring on 10 April 2018, starting in an away Chinese FA Cup tie and eventual 1–0 victory against Qingdao Jonoon. On 25 April 2018, he made his only other appearance of the season in a 2–1 home cup defeat to Chinese Super League opponent Guizhou Hengfeng.

On 16 April 2019, Hu Jing scored his first career goal, securing the 2–0 win against Nanjing Shaye in the 2019 Chinese FA Cup. On 14 September 2019, he scored his first league goal in a 3–2 home win against eventual league runners-up Shijiazhuang Ever Bright. In the 2019 season, Hu Jing's Heilongjiang Lava Spring finished the season at fourth place on 54 points, in what was their best performing season. On 5 May 2021, Hu Jing scored the third goal of the match in a 4–0 league victory over BIT. For his final goal for Heilongjiang Ice City, he scored an equaliser of an eventual 3–2 defeat to Meizhou Hakka on 6 August 2021.

=== Chengdu Rongcheng ===
On 28 April 2022, Hu Jing signed for newly promoted Chinese Super League side Chengdu Rongcheng. He made his debut one month later on 4 June, replacing Li Jianbin as an 82nd-minute substitute in a 2–0 loss to Shenzhen. On 25 November 2022, he scored his first Chengdu Rongcheng and Chinese Super League goal in a 3–0 victory against Guangzhou City. In the 2022 season, he made 17 appearances in all competitions. In the following season, Hu Jing fell out of favour and only featured in eight matches throughout the season.

=== Chongqing Tonglianglong ===
On 1 February 2024, Hu Jing joined China League One newcomers Chongqing Tonglianglong. He chose to wear the number 20 shirt. On 9 March 2024, Hu made his first appearance for Chongqing Tonglianglong in a 1–0 home victory against Liaoning Tieren. In the 2024 season, he totalled 18 league appearances and two cup appearances. On 31 December 2024, Chongqing Tonglianglong announced that Hu Jing would be released from the club.

=== Suzhou Dongwu ===
On 6 February 2025, Hu Jing joined fellow China League One side Suzhou Dongwu, fielding the number 26. He scored his first goal for the club on 1 June, in a 2–1 away defeat to Yanbian Longding, also scoring an own goal in the match. Later in the month on 28 June, he scored against his former side Chongqing Tonglianglong in a 3–1 home loss. In the 96th minute of a home league match against Shijiazhuang Gongfu on 10 August 2025, Hu Jing collapsed on the pitch, having suffered a cardiac arrest. Shijiazhuang Gongfu player Jasond González was first to spot the incident and summon medical attention, and was driven to the hospital by an ambulance at the stadium. The match was then stopped prematurely, with both teams picking up one point from a 1–1 draw. After performing CPR on Hu, he suffered a second cardiac arrest on the ambulance but was eventually in stable and responsive condition.

On 30 December 2025, Hu announced his retirement from professional football.

== International career ==
In 2015, Hu Jing was part of two training camps for the China U19.

== Career statistics ==
Appearances and goals by club, season, and competition
Club	Season	League			Cup		Continental		Other		Total	
Club	Season	Division	Apps	Goals	Apps	Goals	Apps	Goals	Apps	Goals	Apps	Goals
Heilongjiang Ice City	2018	China League One	0	0	2	0	–		–		2	0
Heilongjiang Ice City	2019	China League One	19	1	1	1	–		–		20	2
Heilongjiang Ice City	2020	China League One	12	0	–		–		2 (Note: Appearances in China League One relegation play-offs)	0	14	0
Heilongjiang Ice City	2021	China League One	33	2	0	0	–		–		33	2
Heilongjiang Ice City	Total		64	3	3	1	0	0	2	0	69	4
Chengdu Rongcheng	2022	Chinese Super League	14	1	3	0	–		–		17	1
Chengdu Rongcheng	2023	Chinese Super League	7	0	1	0	–		–		8	0
Chengdu Rongcheng	Total		21	1	4	0	0	0	0	0	25	1
Chongqing Tonglianglong	2024	China League One	18	0	2	0	–		–		20	0
Suzhou Dongwu	2025	China League One	14	2	2	0	–		–		16	2
Career total			117	6	11	1	0	0	0	0	128	7
