= Xu Xiaolong (footballer) =

Chinese footballer (born 1989)

Xu Xiaolong 许小龙
Personal information
- Date of birth: 27 April 1989 (age 37)
- Place of birth: Tianjin, China
- Height: 1.79 m (5 ft 10 1/2 in)
- Position: Defender

Youth career
- Tianjin TEDA

Senior career*
Years	Team	Apps	(Gls)
2011	Tianjin TEDA	0	(0)
2012–2017	Hebei China Fortune	79	(3)
2017	→ Shanghai Shenxin (loan)	25	(2)
2018–2021	Zhejiang FC	32	(0)
- * Club domestic league appearances and goals as of 22 April 2022

Xu Xiaolong (Chinese: 许小龙; pinyin: Xǔ Xiǎolóng; born 27 April 1989) is a Chinese former footballer who played as defender.

== Club career ==
Xu Xiaolong started his football career when he was promoted to Chinese Super League side Tianjin Teda's first team squad in the 2011 season. He transferred to China League Two side Hebei Zhongji in 2012. He was the key player of Hebei to win promotion to China League One in 2013 season and promotion to Chinese Super League in 2015 season. He made his Super League debut on 17 September 2016 in a 3–2 away defeat against Yanbian Funde, coming on as a substitute for Ding Haifeng in the 50th minute. In February 2017, Xu was loaned to League One side Shanghai Shenxin for one season.

On 17 January 2018, Xu transferred to China League One side Zhejiang Greentown along with teammate Zhu Haiwei. He would make his debut on 24 March 2018 in a league game against Zhejiang Yiteng F.C. that ended in a 2-1 defeat. After several seasons as a squad player he would aid them to promotion to the top tier at the end of the 2021 campaign.

== Career statistics ==
As of 22 April 2022.

Appearances and goals by club, season and competition
Club	Season	League			National Cup		Continental		Other		Total	
Club	Season	Division	Apps	Goals	Apps	Goals	Apps	Goals	Apps	Goals	Apps	Goals
Tianjin Teda	2011	Chinese Super League	0	0	-		-		-		0	0
Hebei China Fortune	2012	China League Two	16	0	0	0	-		-		16	0
Hebei China Fortune	2013	China League Two	16	3	2	0	-		-		18	3
Hebei China Fortune	2014	China League One	23	0	0	0	-		-		23	0
Hebei China Fortune	2015	China League One	22	0	1	0	-		-		23	0
Hebei China Fortune	2016	Chinese Super League	2	0	4	0	-		-		6	0
Hebei China Fortune	Total		79	3	7	0	0	0	0	0	86	3
Shanghai Shenxin (loan)	2017	China League One	25	2	1	0	-		-		26	2
Zhejiang Greentown	2018	China League One	15	0	1	0	-		-		16	0
Zhejiang Greentown	2019	China League One	6	0	2	0	-		-		8	0
Zhejiang Greentown	2020	China League One	5	0	0	0	-		0 (Note: Appearance(s) in CSL Relegation play-offs)	0	5	0
Zhejiang Greentown	2021	China League One	6	0	2	0	-		0	0	8	0
Zhejiang Greentown	Total		32	0	5	0	0	0	0	0	37	0
Career total			136	5	13	0	0	0	0	0	149	5
