= Yan Zhiyu =

Chinese footballer (born 1993)

Yan Zhiyu 严智宇
Personal information
- Full name: Yan Zhiyu
- Date of birth: 8 February 1993 (age 33)
- Place of birth: Wuhan, Hubei, China
- Height: 1.70 m (5 ft 7 in)
- Position: Full-back

Youth career
- 2005–2008: Wuhan Optics Valley
- 2009–2010: Hubei Youth

Senior career*
Years	Team	Apps	(Gls)
2011–2012	Hubei Youth	18	(1)
2013–2017	Xinjiang Tianshan Leopard	106	(2)
2018–2026	Changchun Yatai	118	(2)
- * Club domestic league appearances and goals as of 28 August 2025

Yan Zhiyu (Chinese: 严智宇; pinyin: Yán Zhìyǔ; born 8 February 1993) is a Chinese footballer.

== Club career ==
Yan Zhiyu started his professional football career in 2011 when he was promoted to Hubei Youth's squad for the 2011 China League Two. He transferred to China League One newcomer Hubei China-Kyle in 2013. In January 2014, Yan followed the club move to Urumqi where they changed their name as Xinjiang Tianshan Leopard. On 17 April 2016, he scored his first goal for the club in a 2–0 home win against Shanghai Shenxin.

On 10 February 2018, Yan joined Chinese Super League side Changchun Yatai after a successful trial. On 24 April 2018, he made his debut for the club in the 2018 Chinese FA Cup against third-tier club Sichuan Jiuniu. Despite scoring in the penalty shoot-out, Changchun Yatai finally lost 4–3. He made his Super League debut on 1 August 2018, playing the whole match in a 3–0 home win over Dalian Yifang. On 6 October 2018, he scored his first goal for the club in a 3–3 away draw against Tianjin TEDA.

On 21 May 2026, Yan was given a 5-year ban for match-fixing by the Chinese Football Association.

== Career statistics ==
As of match played 31 December 2025.

Appearances and goals by club, season and competition
Club	Season	League			National Cup		Continental		Other		Total	
Club	Season	Division	Apps	Goals	Apps	Goals	Apps	Goals	Apps	Goals	Apps	Goals
Hubei Youth	2011	China League Two			-		-		-			
Hubei Youth	2012	China League Two	18	1	2	0	-		-		20	1
Hubei Youth	Total		18	1	2	0	0	0	0	0	20	1
Xinjiang Tianshan Leopard	2013	China League One	8	0	0	0	-		-		8	0
Xinjiang Tianshan Leopard	2014	China League One	27	0	0	0	-		-		27	0
Xinjiang Tianshan Leopard	2015	China League One	15	0	3	0	-		-		18	0
Xinjiang Tianshan Leopard	2016	China League One	26	1	1	0	-		-		27	1
Xinjiang Tianshan Leopard	2017	China League One	30	1	0	0	-		-		30	1
Xinjiang Tianshan Leopard	Total		106	2	4	0	0	0	0	0	110	2
Changchun Yatai	2018	Chinese Super League	9	1	1	0	-		-		10	1
Changchun Yatai	2019	China League One	28	0	0	0	-		-		28	0
Changchun Yatai	2020	China League One	8	0	0	0	-		-		8	0
Changchun Yatai	2021	Chinese Super League	11	0	0	0	-		-		11	0
Changchun Yatai	2022	Chinese Super League	18	0	1	0	-		-		19	0
Changchun Yatai	2023	Chinese Super League	19	1	1	0	-		-		20	1
Changchun Yatai	2024	Chinese Super League	15	0	1	0	-		-		16	0
Changchun Yatai	2025	Chinese Super League	4	0	0	0	-		-		4	0
Changchun Yatai	Total		112	2	4	0	0	0	0	0	116	2
Career total			236	5	10	0	0	0	0	0	246	5

== Honours ==
=== Club ===
Changchun Yatai

- China League One: 2020
