= Zhang Yinuo =

Chinese footballer

Zhang Yinuo 张一诺
Personal information
- Full name: Zhang Yinuo
- Date of birth: 14 July 1994 (age 32)
- Place of birth: Dazhou, Sichuan, China
- Height: 1.89 m (6 ft 2 1/2 in)
- Position: Goalkeeper

Youth career
- 2005–2011: Chengdu FA
- 2011–2012: Chengdu Blades

Senior career*
Years	Team	Apps	(Gls)
2013–2014	Chengdu Tiancheng	34	(0)
2015–2017	Shanghai Shenxin	36	(0)
2018–2019	Shijiazhuang Ever Bright	1	(0)
2020–2021	Chengdu Rongcheng	38	(0)
2023	Dandong Tengyue	7	(0)

International career^{‡}
2015–2016	China U-23	5	(0)
- * Club domestic league appearances and goals as of 31 December 2021 ‡ National team caps and goals as of 14 June 2016

Zhang Yinuo (Chinese: 张一诺; pinyin: Zhāng Yīnuò; born 14 July 1994) is a Chinese former football player who played as a goalkeeper.

== Club career ==
Zhang Yinuo joined Chengdu Blades youth team system from Chengdu Football Association in 2011. He was promoted to Chengdu Blades's first team squad in 2013. On 21 September 2013, Zhang made his senior debut in a 2–0 league victory against Yanbian Changbai Tiger. He became the first choice goalkeeper after his debut, playing all matches for the remainder of the season. He kept his regular position and made 28 appearances in the 2014 league season.

On 9 February 2015, Zhang transferred to Chinese Super League side Shanghai Shenxin after Chengdu were relegated and dissolved. He made his Super League debut on 18 April 2015 in a 4–1 home defeat against Changchun Yatai. At the end of the league campaign Shanghai Shenxin were relegated. Zhang remained with the club, however he would lose his place as first choice goalkeeper to Zhang Xunwei and then Guo Wei before leaving the club to join fellow League One side Shijiazhuang Ever Bright on 9 February 2018.

After playing understudy to Shao Puliang at Shijiazhuang Ever Bright, Zhang joined another second tier club in Chengdu Rongcheng. He would go on to make his debut for the club in a league game on 12 September 2020 against Beijing Renhe, which ended in a 3-2 victory. The following season he would establish himself as a vital member within the team and aid them to promotion to the top tier at the end of the 2021 league campaign.

== Career statistics ==
Statistics accurate as of match played 31 December 2021.

Appearances and goals by club, season and competition
Club	Season	League			National Cup		Continental		Other		Total	
Club	Season	Division	Apps	Goals	Apps	Goals	Apps	Goals	Apps	Goals	Apps	Goals
Chengdu Tiancheng	2013	China League One	6	0	0	0	-		-		6	0
Chengdu Tiancheng	2014	China League One	28	0	0	0	-		-		28	0
Chengdu Tiancheng	Total		34	0	0	0	0	0	0	0	34	0
Shanghai Shenxin	2015	Chinese Super League	21	0	0	0	-		-		21	0
Shanghai Shenxin	2016	China League One	15	0	0	0	-		-		15	0
Shanghai Shenxin	2017	China League One	0	0	0	0	-		-		0	0
Shanghai Shenxin	Total		36	0	0	0	0	0	0	0	36	0
Shijiazhuang Ever Bright	2018	China League One	1	0	1	0	-		-		2	0
Shijiazhuang Ever Bright	2019	China League One	0	0	2	0	-		-		2	0
Shijiazhuang Ever Bright	Total		1	0	3	0	0	0	0	0	4	0
Chengdu Rongcheng	2020	China League One	14	0	0	0	-		-		14	0
Chengdu Rongcheng	2021	China League One	24	0	0	0	-		0 (Note: Appearance(s) in CSL Relegation play-offs)	0	24	0
Chengdu Rongcheng	Total		38	0	0	0	0	0	0	0	38	0
Career total			109	0	3	0	0	0	0	0	112	0
