= Bai Tianci =

Chinese footballer

Personal information
- Date of birth: 28 August 1998 (age 28)
- Place of birth: Huainan, Anhui, China
- Height: 1.80 m (5 ft 11 in)
- Position: Forward

Team information
- Current team: Tai'an Tiankuang
- Number: 22

Youth career
- –2017: Shandong Taishan

Senior career*
Years	Team	Apps	(Gls)
2017–2022	Shandong Taishan	0	(0)
2017	→ Shanghai Shenxin (loan)	9	(0)
2018	→ Meizhou Meixian Techand	28	(1)
2019	→ Kunshan FC (loan)	29	(3)
2023-2025	Rizhao Yuqi	23	(2)
2025-	Tai'an Tiankuang	10	(2)
- * Club domestic league appearances and goals as of 14:01, 19 April 2022 (UTC)

Bai Tianci (simplified Chinese: 柏天赐; traditional Chinese: 柏天賜; pinyin: Bǎi Tiāncì; born 28 August 1998) is a Chinese footballer currently playing as a forward for Tai'an Tiankuang.

== Career statistics ==
=== Club ===
As of 28 July 2021.

Club	Season	League			Cup		Continental		Other		Total	
Club	Season	Division	Apps	Goals	Apps	Goals	Apps	Goals	Apps	Goals	Apps	Goals
Shandong Taishan	2017	Chinese Super League	0	0	0	0	0	0	0	0	0	0
Shandong Taishan	2018	Chinese Super League	0	0	0	0	0	0	0	0	0	0
Shandong Taishan	2019	Chinese Super League	0	0	0	0	0	0	0	0	0	0
Shandong Taishan	2020	Chinese Super League	0	0	0	0	0	0	0	0	0	0
Shandong Taishan	2021	Chinese Super League	0	0	0	0	0	0	0	0	0	0
Shandong Taishan	Total		0	0	0	0	0	0	0	0	0	0
Shanghai Shenxin (loan)	2017	China League Two	9	0	2 (Note: Appearances in the Chinese FA Cup)	1	–		0	0	11	1
Meizhou Meixian Techand (loan)	2018	China League One	26	1	1	1	–		2 (Note: Appearances in the China League Two playoffs)	0	29	1
Kunshan FC (loan)	2019	China League Two	29	3	1	1	–		0	0	30	3
Career total			64	4	4	1	0	0	0	0	68	5
