= Liu Yue (footballer, born 1997) =

Chinese footballer

Liu Yue 刘越
Personal information
- Date of birth: 14 September 1997 (age 29)
- Place of birth: Wuhan, Hubei, China
- Height: 1.74 m (5 ft 8 1/2 in)
- Position: Midfielder

Team information
- Current team: Ningbo FC
- Number: 11

Youth career
- 2008–2010: Hubei Youth
- 2011–2012: Wuhan Youth
- 2015: Harbin Yiteng

Senior career*
Years	Team	Apps	(Gls)
2012–2014	Shenyang Dongjin	5	(0)
2016–2017	Zhejiang Yiteng	49	(3)
2018–2019	Tianjin Quanjian	8	(0)
2019	→ Inner Mongolia Zhongyou (loan)	26	(1)
2020–2023	Shenzhen FC	35	(2)
2021	→ Wuhan Three Towns (loan)	7	(0)
2024–2025	Wuhan Three Towns	24	(2)
2025	→ Suzhou Dongwu (loan)	10	(0)
2026–	Ningbo FC	0	(0)

International career^{‡}
2016	China U19	2	(0)
2018–2020	China U22	7	(0)
- * Club domestic league appearances and goals as of 4 November 2023 ‡ National team caps and goals as of 5 June 2018

Liu Yue (Chinese: 刘越; pinyin: Liú Yuè; born 14 September 1997) is a Chinese footballer who currently plays as a midfielder for China League One club Ningbo FC.

== Club career ==
Liu Yue was promoted to China League One club Shenyang Dongjin's first team squad at the age of 15 in 2012. He made his senior debut on 15 April 2014 when Shenyang Dongjin played in the China League Two, in a 4–0 defeat against Beijing Institute of Technology in the 2014 Chinese FA Cup.

Liu transferred to China League One side Zhejiang Yiteng in 2016. On 12 April 2016, he made his debut for the club in a 1–0 defeat against amateur club Shanghai Jiading Boo King in the second round of 2016 Chinese FA Cup. He made his League One debut four days later on 16 April 2016 in a 2–1 away loss against Qingdao Huanghai, coming on for Piao Taoyu in the 85th minute. Liu became a regular starter after the match and scored his first senior goal on 2 May 2016, in a 2–0 win over Hunan Billows. He made 23 league appearances and scored one goal for Yiteng in the 2016 season. Liu continued his promising performances in the 2017 season, scoring two goals in 26 appearances.

Liu transferred to Chinese Super League side Tianjin Quanjian on 26 February 2018. On 2 March 2018, he made his debut for the club in a 4–0 away win against Henan Jianye. In February 2019, Liu was loaned to China League One side Inner Mongolia Zhongyou for the 2019 season.

In July 2020, Liu was one of eight former Tianjin Tianhai players to sign with Shenzhen FC. He would go on to make his debut on 9 September 2020 in a league game against Guangzhou Evergrande Taobao in a 2-0 defeat. After making a handful of games for the club he would be loaned out to second tier club Wuhan Three Towns where he was part of the team that won the division title and promotion as the club entered the top tier for the first tine in their history.

On 27 February 2026, Liu joined China League One club Ningbo FC.

== Career statistics ==
As of 31 December 2022.

Appearances and goals by club, season and competition
Club	Season	League			National Cup		Continental		Other		Total	
Club	Season	Division	Apps	Goals	Apps	Goals	Apps	Goals	Apps	Goals	Apps	Goals
Shenyang Dongjin	2012	China League One	0	0	0	0	-		-		0	0
Shenyang Dongjin	2013	China League Two	0	0	0	0	-		-		0	0
Shenyang Dongjin	2014	China League Two	5	0	1	0	-		-		6	0
Shenyang Dongjin	Total		5	0	1	0	0	0	0	0	6	0
Zhejiang Yiteng	2016	China League One	23	1	1	0	-		-		24	1
Zhejiang Yiteng	2017	China League One	26	2	0	0	-		-		26	2
Zhejiang Yiteng	Total		49	3	1	0	0	0	0	0	50	3
Tianjin Quanjian	2018	Chinese Super League	8	0	2	0	0	0	-		10	0
Inner Mongolia Zhongyou (loan)	2019	China League One	26	1	0	0	-		-		26	1
Shenzhen FC	2020	Chinese Super League	6	0	0	0	-		-		6	0
Shenzhen FC	2022	Chinese Super League	9	0	1	0	-		-		10	0
Shenzhen FC	Total		15	0	1	0	0	0	0	0	16	0
Wuhan Three Towns (loan)	2021	China League One	7	0	1	0	-		-		8	0
Career total			110	4	6	0	0	0	0	0	116	4

== Honours ==
=== Club ===
Wuhan Three Towns

- China League One: 2021
