= Zhu Haiwei =

Chinese footballer (born 1991)

Zhu Haiwei 朱海威
Personal information
- Date of birth: 9 October 1991 (age 35)
- Place of birth: Guangzhou, Guangdong, China
- Height: 1.78 m (5 ft 10 in)
- Positions: Left winger; attacking midfielder

Team information
- Current team: Lanzhou Longyuan Athletic
- Number: 11

Senior career*
Years	Team	Apps	(Gls)
2009–2012	Tianjin Songjiang	48	(1)
2013	Jönköpings Södra	0	(0)
2013–2014	Sertanense	4	(0)
2014–2017	Hebei China Fortune	74	(5)
2018–2020	Zhejiang Greentown	11	(0)
2021–2025	Shijiazhuang Gongfu	103	(12)
2024	→ Wuxi Wugo (loan)	13	(0)
2026–	Lanzhou Longyuan Athletic	0	(0)
- * Club domestic league appearances and goals as of 08 September 2024

Zhu Haiwei (Chinese: 朱海威; pinyin: Zhū Hǎiwēi; born 9 October 1991) is a Chinese professional footballer who plays as a left winger or attacking midfielder for Lanzhou Longyuan Athletic.

== Career ==
Zhu Haiwei started his professional football career in 2009 when he joined China League Two side Tianjin Songjiang. He was the key player in Tianjin's promotion campaign in the 2010 season. Zhu was signed by Superettan side Jönköpings Södra along with Tan Binliang after a successful trial in April 2013. He returned to China in the summer of 2013 but didn't pass the trial with Chengdu Blades. Zhu transferred to Campeonato de Portugal club Sertanense in September 2013. He made his debut for Sertanense on 13 October 2013, in a 2–1 home win against Nogueirense, coming on as a substitute for Dino Pereira in the 77th minute.

Zhu moved to China League One side Hebei Zhongji in January 2014. On 15 March 2014, he made his debut for Hebei in a 2–2 away draw against Guangdong Sunray Cave. Zhu scored his first goal for Hebei on 17 May 2014 in a 2–1 home win against Yanbian Changbaishan. He scored 2 goals in 26 appearances in the 2014 season which secured Hebei's stay in the second flight for the next season. Zhu kept his position in the 2015 season after China Fortune Land Development injected a large amount of money to the club. He played 28 league matches and scored 3 goals in the season as Hebei China Fortune won promotion to the Chinese Super League by finishing the runners-up in the league. Zhu made his Super League debut on 2 April 2016 in a 1–1 away draw against Jiangsu Suning, coming on as a substitute for Jiang Ning in the 90th minute. Zhu appeared 20 times in the Super League between 2016 and 2017 season, mainly coming on as a substitute.

On 17 January 2018, Zhu transferred to China League One side Zhejiang Greentown along with teammate Xu Xiaolong.

== Career statistics ==
As of 08 September 2024.

Appearances and goals by club, season and competition
Club	Season	League			National Cup		Continental		Other		Total	
Club	Season	Division	Apps	Goals	Apps	Goals	Apps	Goals	Apps	Goals	Apps	Goals
Tianjin Songjiang	2009	China League Two			-		-		-			
Tianjin Songjiang	2010	China League Two			-		-		-			
Tianjin Songjiang	2011	China League One	21	0	2	0	-		-		23	0
Tianjin Songjiang	2012	China League One	27	1	1	0	-		-		28	1
Tianjin Songjiang	Total		48	1	3	0	0	0	0	0	51	1
Jönköpings Södra	2013	Superettan	0	0	0	0	-		-		0	0
Sertanense	2013–14	Campeonato de Portugal	4	0	1	0	-		-		5	0
Hebei China Fortune	2014	China League One	26	2	0	0	-		-		26	2
Hebei China Fortune	2015	China League One	28	3	2	1	-		-		30	4
Hebei China Fortune	2016	Chinese Super League	8	0	4	0	-		-		12	0
Hebei China Fortune	2017	Chinese Super League	12	0	1	0	-		-		13	0
Hebei China Fortune	Total		74	5	7	1	0	0	0	0	81	6
Zhejiang Greentown	2018	China League One	11	0	1	0	-		-		12	0
Zhejiang Greentown	2019	China League One	0	0	2	0	-		-		2	0
Zhejiang Greentown	2020	China League One	0	0	0	0	-		-		0	0
Zhejiang Greentown	Total		11	0	3	0	0	0	0	0	14	0
Shijiazhuang Gongfu	2021	China League Two	26	4	0	0	-		-		26	4
Shijiazhuang Gongfu	2022	China League One	31	5	0	0	-		-		31	5
Shijiazhuang Gongfu	2023	China League One	22	2	0	0	-		-		22	2
Shijiazhuang Gongfu	2024	China League One	5	0	1	0	-		-		6	0
Shijiazhuang Gongfu	Total		84	11	1	0	0	0	0	0	85	11
Wuxi Wugo	2024	China League One	6	0	1	1	-		-		7	1
Career total			227	17	16	2	0	0	0	0	243	19
