= Li Jian (footballer, born March 1985) =

Chinese footballer

Li Jian 李健
Personal information
- Date of birth: March 9, 1985 (age 41)
- Place of birth: Shenyang, Liaoning, China
- Height: 1.78 m (5 ft 10 in)
- Position: Defender

Senior career*
Years	Team	Apps	(Gls)
2004–2008	Shenyang Ginde	17	(0)
2009–2012	Shenyang Dongjin	65	(3)
2013–2017	Harbin Yiteng	114	(1)
2018–2020	Nei Mongol Zhongyou	51	(0)
- * Club domestic league appearances and goals as of 31 December 2019

Li Jian (Chinese: 李健; born 9 March 1985 in Shenyang, Liaoning) is a Chinese former football player.

== Club career ==
In 2004, Li Jian started his professional footballer career with Shenyang Ginde in the Chinese Super League. He would eventually make his league debut for Shenyang on 3 August 2005 in a game against Beijing Guoan. In February 2009, Li transferred to China League One side Shenyang Dongjin. In February 2013, Li transferred to China League One side Harbin Yiteng on a free transfer.

In February 2018, Li transferred to China League One side Nei Mongol Zhongyou.

== Career statistics ==
Statistics accurate as of match played 31 December 2019.

Appearances and goals by club, season and competition
Club	Season	League			National Cup		League Cup		Continental		Total	
Club	Season	Division	Apps	Goals	Apps	Goals	Apps	Goals	Apps	Goals	Apps	Goals
Shenyang Ginde	2004	Chinese Super League	0	0	0	0	0	0	-		0	0
Shenyang Ginde	2005	Chinese Super League	16	0	0	0	0	0	-		16	0
Shenyang Ginde	2006	Chinese Super League	1	0	0	0	-		-		1	0
Shenyang Ginde	2007	Chinese Super League	0	0	-		-		-		0	0
Shenyang Ginde	2008	Chinese Super League	0	0	-		-		-		0	0
Shenyang Ginde	Total		17	0	0	0	0	0	0	0	17	0
Shenyang Dongjin	2009	China League One	21	1	-		-		-		21	1
Shenyang Dongjin	2010	China League One	19	0	-		-		-		19	0
Shenyang Dongjin	2011	China League One	15	2	0	0	-		-		15	2
Shenyang Dongjin	2012	China League One	10	0	1	0	-		-		11	0
Shenyang Dongjin	Total		65	3	1	0	0	0	0	0	66	3
Harbin Yiteng	2013	China League One	11	0	2	0	-		-		13	0
Harbin Yiteng	2014	Chinese Super League	28	0	0	0	-		-		28	0
Harbin Yiteng	2015	China League One	25	1	0	0	-		-		25	1
Harbin Yiteng	2016	China League One	23	0	0	0	-		-		23	0
Harbin Yiteng	2017	China League One	27	0	0	0	-		-		27	0
Harbin Yiteng	Total		114	1	2	0	0	0	0	0	116	1
Nei Mongol Zhongyou	2018	China League One	20	0	0	0	-		-		20	0
Nei Mongol Zhongyou	2019	China League One	24	0	0	0	-		-		24	0
Nei Mongol Zhongyou	Total		44	0	0	0	0	0	0	0	44	0
Career total			240	4	3	0	0	0	0	0	243	4
