= Gao Zengxiang =

Chinese footballer (born 1989)

Gao Zengxiang 高增翔
Personal information
- Date of birth: 21 December 1989 (age 36)
- Place of birth: Shenyang, Liaoning, China
- Height: 1.78 m (5 ft 10 in)
- Position: Midfielder

Youth career
- Changsha Ginde

Senior career*
Years	Team	Apps	(Gls)
2009–2013	Guangzhou R&F	46	(0)
2014–2017	Shijiazhuang Ever Bright	39	(1)
2018–2020	Nei Mongol Zhongyou	48	(0)
2021	Quanzhou Yassin	0	(0)
2021	Xi'an Wolves	10	(0)
- * Club domestic league appearances and goals as of 31 December 2019

Gao Zengxiang (Chinese: 高增翔; pinyin: Gāo Zēngxiáng; born 21 December 1989 in Shenyang) is a Chinese football player.

== Club career ==
Gao joined Changsha Ginde youth team system in the early year and was promoted to first team squad in 2009. On 14 July 2010, he made his Super League debut in a 2–0 away defeat against Henan Jianye, coming on as a substitute for Wang Bin in the 67th minute. He played 13 league matches in the 2010 league season, all came on from the bench, as Changsha Ginde finished the bottom of the league and relegation to China League One. In February 2011, the club moved to Shenzhen as the club's name changed into Shenzhen Phoenix. After refusing to have a trial in Hunan Billows, Gao chose to stay in the club. The club were bought by Chinese property developers Guangzhou R&F and moved to Guangzhou in June 2011 and won promotion back to the Super League at the first attempt. However, it was not a successful season for Gao, he made just 6 appearances in the league, all coming on as a substitute. In 2012, after Brazilian manager Sérgio Farias took charge of the club, Gao became a regular starter. He made his first league start on 10 March 2012, in a 3–1 home victory against Beijing Guoan.

On 19 February 2014, Gao transferred to China League One side Shijiazhuang Yongchan. On 27 February 2014, Gao transferred to Nei Mongol Zhongyou.

== Career statistics ==
Statistics accurate as of match played 31 December 2019.

Appearances and goals by club, season and competition
Club	Season	League			National Cup		Continental		Other		Total	
Club	Season	Division	Apps	Goals	Apps	Goals	Apps	Goals	Apps	Goals	Apps	Goals
Guangzhou R&F	2009	Chinese Super League	0	0	-		-		-		0	0
Guangzhou R&F	2010	Chinese Super League	13	0	-		-		-		13	0
Guangzhou R&F	2011	China League One	6	0	2	0	-		-		8	0
Guangzhou R&F	2012	Chinese Super League	23	0	2	0	-		-		25	0
Guangzhou R&F	2013	Chinese Super League	4	0	1	0	-		-		5	0
Guangzhou R&F	Total		46	0	5	0	0	0	0	0	51	0
Shijiazhuang Yongchang	2014	China League One	17	1	0	0	-		-		17	1
Shijiazhuang Yongchang	2015	Chinese Super League	2	0	1	0	-		-		3	0
Shijiazhuang Yongchang	2016	Chinese Super League	1	0	2	0	-		-		3	0
Shijiazhuang Yongchang	2017	China League One	19	0	1	0	-		-		20	0
Shijiazhuang Yongchang	Total		39	1	4	0	0	0	0	0	43	1
Nei Mongol Zhongyou	2018	China League One	23	0	1	0	-		-		24	0
Nei Mongol Zhongyou	2019	China League One	17	0	1	0	-		-		18	0
Nei Mongol Zhongyou	Total		40	0	2	0	0	0	0	0	42	0
Career total			125	1	11	0	0	0	0	0	136	1
