= Cao Kang =

Chinese footballer (born 1993)

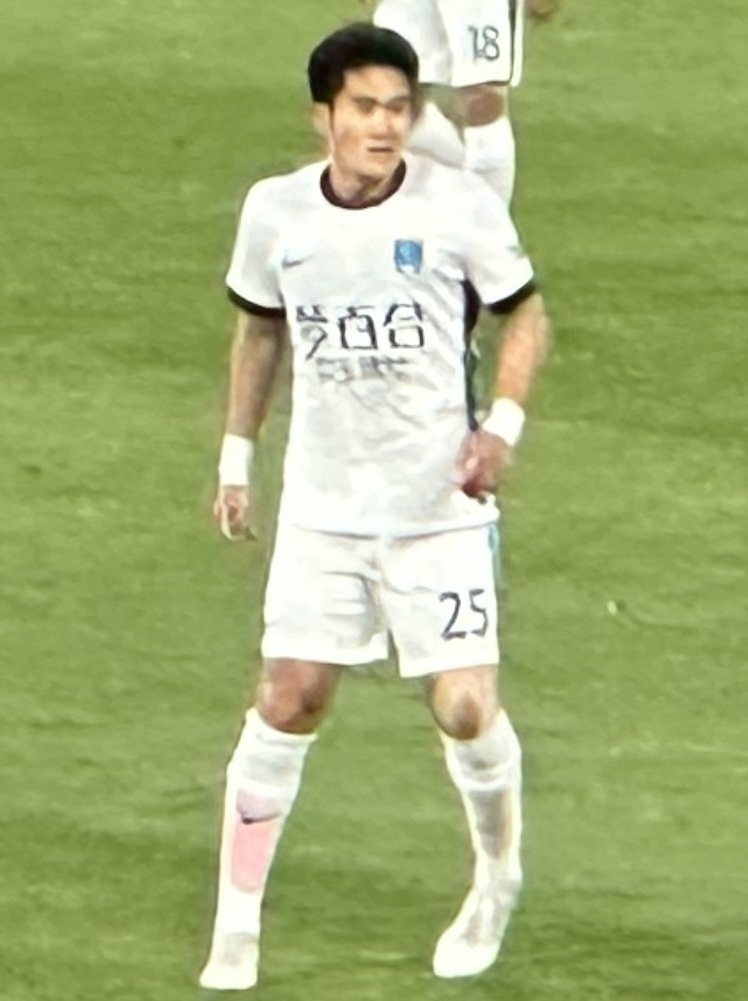
- Cao Kang in May 2025

Personal information
- Full name: Cao Kang
- Date of birth: 8 January 1993 (age 33)
- Place of birth: Binzhou, Shandong, China
- Height: 1.85 m (6 ft 1 in)
- Position: Midfielder

Team information
- Current team: Shaanxi Union
- Number: 25

Youth career
- –2013: Jiangsu FA

Senior career*
Years	Team	Apps	(Gls)
2011–2013	Jiangsu Youth	31	(3)
2014–2017	Jiangsu Suning	0	(0)
2017	→ Heilongjiang Lava Spring (loan)	22	(1)
2018–2022	Heilongjiang Ice City	116	(7)
2023–2025	Nantong Zhiyun	82	(4)
2026–	Shaanxi Union	0	(0)
- * Club domestic league appearances and goals as of 4 February 2026

Cao Kang (Chinese: 曹康; pinyin: Cáo Kāng; born 8 January 1993) is a Chinese professional footballer who plays as a midfielder for China League One club Shaanxi Union.

== Career ==
=== Early career ===
Born in Boxing County in Binzhou, Shandong, Cao Kang moved to the city of Changzhou in Jiangsu at a young age, where he started his football journey, being in the Jiangsu provincial youth team squad that participated in the 2011 China League Two. In 2013, Cao Kang was included in Jiangsu Province's squad for the 2013 National Games of China at the under-20 level. The same year, Cao Kang gained playing experience in an off-season friendly in a 4–0 loss as he faced Russian side CSKA Moscow. In 2014, Cao was named in Jiangsu Sainty's first-team squad for the 2014 Chinese Super League season. In 2016, after Jiangsu's Chinese FA Cup win in 2015, Cao Kang was included in the club's 2016 AFC Champions League squad.

=== Heilongjiang Ice City ===
On 13 March 2017, Cao Kang signed for Heilongjiang Lava Spring on loan from Jiangsu Suning. He scored his first goal for the club on 17 June 2017 in a 2–1 away league victory away at Dalian Boyoung. He helped the team clinch the 2017 China League Two title, securing promotion to China League One. On 1 March 2018, Heilongjiang Lava Spring announced that they have signed Cao Kang on a permanent basis. In the league opener on 11 March 2018, Cao Kang scored an equaliser in a 2–2 draw with eventual league runners-up Shenzhen. On 25 May 2019, Cao Kang opened the scoring in a 2–0 victory over Liaoning. On the final day of the 2019 China League One season on 2 November, Cao Kang scored a brace in a 4–1 win over Changchun Yatai to help Heilongjiang reach fourth place, the highest league position the club has reached in its history, as well as break Changchun Yatai's chances of an immediate promotion back to the Chinese Super League. On 1 July 2022, Cao Kang scored Heilongjiang Ice City's second goal in a 3–1 win over Xinjiang Tianshan Leopard. Accumulatively over his five permanent seasons at the club, Cao Kang provided seven goals in 118 appearances.

=== Nantong Zhiyun ===
On 23 January 2023, Cao Kang signed for newly-promoted Chinese Super League side Nantong Zhiyun. He scored his first goal for Nantong Zhiyun on 7 July 2023, in a 1–1 away draw with Tianjin Jinmen Tiger. He scored his second goal of the 2023 season on 8 August, in a 1–1 draw against Zhejiang. The following season, Cao Kang scored the only goal in a 1–0 home win over Meizhou Hakka on 5 April 2024. Cao's Nantong Zhiyun were relegated to China League One at the end of the 2024 Chinese Super League season.

=== Shaanxi Union ===
On 4 February 2026, Cao joined fellow China League One club Shaanxi Union.

== Style of play ==
Cao Kang has been described by Nantong Zhiyun as having great aggressiveness and pressing, bringing defensive cover, and being capable of contributing on both sides of the pitch.

== Career statistics ==
As of 1 November 2025

Appearances and goals by club, season, and competition
Club	Season	League			Cup		Continental		Other		Total	
Club	Season	Division	Apps	Goals	Apps	Goals	Apps	Goals	Apps	Goals	Apps	Goals
Jiangsu Youth	2011	China League Two	12	0	–		–		–		12	0
Jiangsu Youth	2012	China League Two	19	3	–		–		–		19	3
Jiangsu Youth	Total		31	3	0	0	0	0	0	0	31	3
Jiangsu Suning	2014	Chinese Super League	0	0	0	0	–		–		0	0
Jiangsu Suning	2015	Chinese Super League	0	0	0	0	–		–		0	0
Jiangsu Suning	2016	Chinese Super League	0	0	0	0	0 (Note: Appearances in AFC Champions League)	0	0 (Note: Appearances in Chinese FA Super Cup)	0	0	0
Jiangsu Suning	Total		0	0	0	0	0	0	0	0	0	0
Heilongjiang Lava Spring (loan)	2017	China League Two	22	1	1	0	–		5 (Note: Appearances in China League Two play-offs)	0	28	1
Heilongjiang Ice City	2018	China League One	29	1	0	0	–		–		29	1
Heilongjiang Ice City	2019	China League One	22	4	2	0	–		–		24	4
Heilongjiang Ice City	2020	China League One	14	0	–		–		2 (Note: Appearances in China League One relegation play-offs)	0	16	0
Heilongjiang Ice City	2021	China League One	19	1	0	0	–		–		19	1
Heilongjiang Ice City	2022	China League One	32	1	0	0	–		–		32	1
Heilongjiang Ice City	Total		116	7	2	0	0	0	2	0	120	7
Nantong Zhiyun	2023	Chinese Super League	28	2	2	0	–		–		30	2
Nantong Zhiyun	2024	Chinese Super League	27	2	0	0	–		–		27	2
Nantong Zhiyun	2025	China League One	27	0	0	0	–		–		27	0
Nantong Zhiyun	Total		82	4	2	0	0	0	0	0	84	4
Career total			251	15	5	0	0	0	7	0	263	15

== Honours ==
Heilongjiang Lava Spring

- China League Two: 2017
