= Feng Gang =

Chinese football player

Feng Gang 冯刚
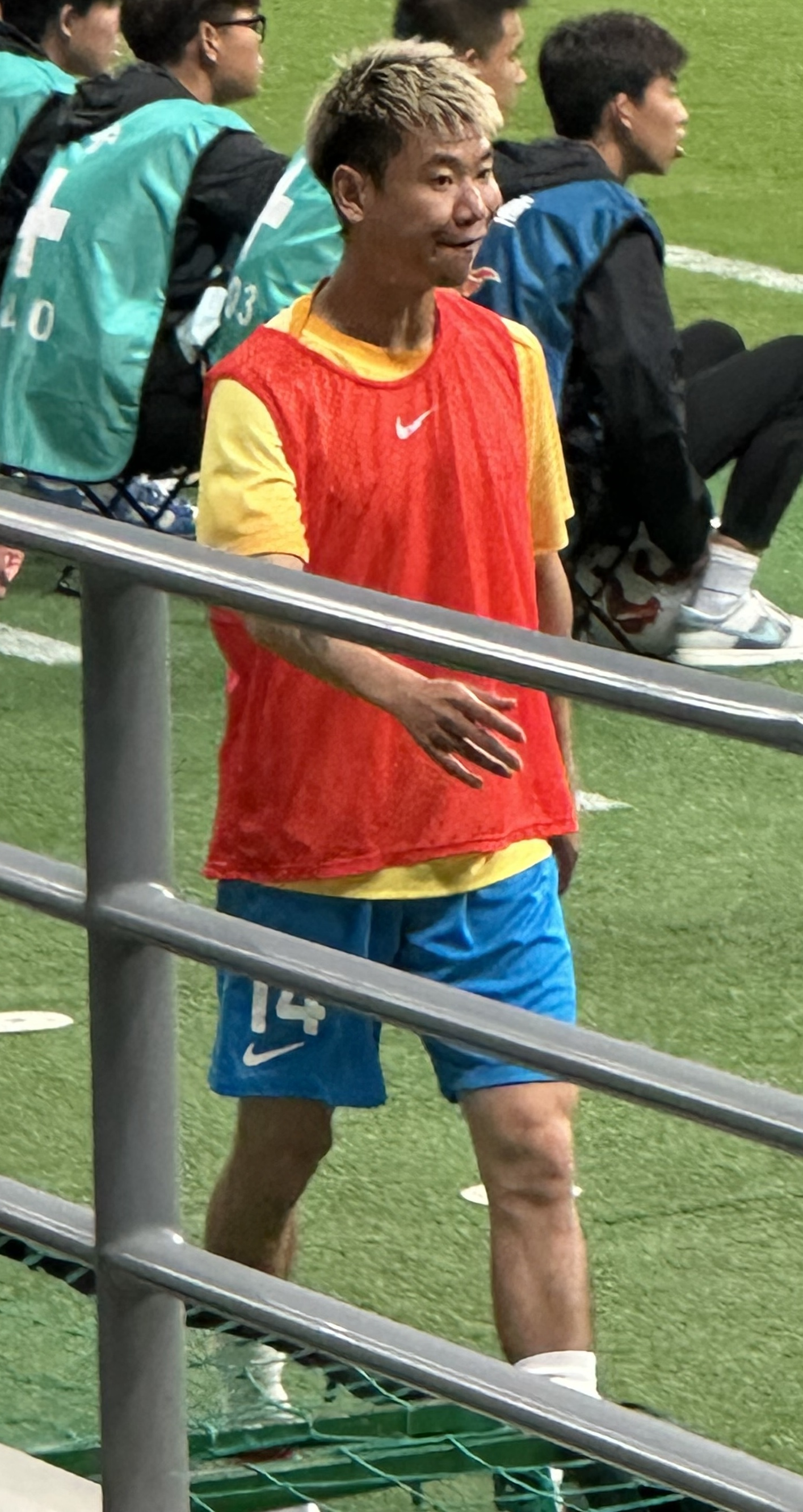
- Feng Gang in June 2025

Personal information
- Date of birth: 6 March 1993 (age 33)
- Place of birth: Wuhan, Hubei, China
- Height: 1.76 m (5 ft 9 1/2 in)
- Position: Midfielder

Team information
- Current team: Meizhou Hakka
- Number: 31

Youth career
- Hangzhou Greentown

Senior career*
Years	Team	Apps	(Gls)
2011	Wenzhou Provenza	6	(0)
2012–2017	Hangzhou Greentown	116	(7)
2017	→ Henan Jianye (loan)	14	(0)
2018–2021	Hebei FC	21	(0)
2020	→ Zhejiang Energy Greentown (loan)	2	(0)
2022	Shaanxi Chang'an Athletic	6	(0)
2022	Qingdao Youth Island	12	(1)
2023	Shanghai Jiading Huilong	8	(1)
2023–2025	Qingdao West Coast	45	(1)
2026–	Meizhou Hakka	0	(0)

International career^{‡}
2010	China U-16		
2010–2012	China U-19		
2013–2016	China U-23		
2017–	China	1	(0)
- * Club domestic league appearances and goals as of 31 December 2025 ‡ National team caps and goals as of 14 January 2017

Feng Gang
- Simplified Chinese: 冯刚
- Traditional Chinese: 馮剛
Transcriptions
Standard Mandarin
- Hanyu Pinyin: Féng Gāng
- IPA: [fə̌ŋ káŋ]

Feng Gang (Chinese: 冯刚; pinyin: Féng Gāng; born 6 March 1993 in Wuhan) is a Chinese football player who currently plays for China League One club Meizhou Hakka.

== Club career ==
Feng started his professional football career in 2011 when he was loaned to China League Two club Wenzhou Provenza from Hangzhou Greentown for one year. He was promoted to Hangzhou Greentown's first team squad by Takeshi Okada in 2012. On 17 March, he made his Super League debut in the second round of the season which Hangzhou Greentown lost 3–0 to Jiangsu Sainty, coming on as a substitute for Wang Kai in the 75th minute. He scored his first senior goal at his first start for the club, in a 2-1 home victory against Liaoning Whowin on 12 May. Feng became the regular player of the team after this match and continued to score twice (vs Shanghai Shenhua on 4 August and vs Dalian Shide on 25 August) in the 2012 league season.

On 27 February 2018, Feng transferred to Chinese Super League side Hebei China Fortune.

On 6 March 2026, Feng signed with China League One club Meizhou Hakka.

== International career ==
Feng was first called up into China U-17's squad in March 2010, and received his first called up for China U-20 by Su Maozhen in December 2010. He played for China U-20 in the 2011 Granatkin Memorial, 2011 Toulon Tournament and 2011 Weifang Cup. However, he was excluded from the squad for 2012 AFC U-19 Championship qualification held by Malaysia in October 2011.

On 14 January 2017, Feng made his debut for Chinese national team in the third-place playoff of 2017 China Cup against Croatia, coming on as a substitute for Gao Zhunyi in the half time.

== Career statistics ==
Statistics accurate as of match played 31 December 2025.

Appearances and goals by club, season and competition
Club	Season	League			National Cup		Continental		Other		Total	
Club	Season	Division	Apps	Goals	Apps	Goals	Apps	Goals	Apps	Goals	Apps	Goals
Wenzhou Provenza	2011	China League Two	6	0	-		-		-		6	0
Hangzhou Greentown	2012	Chinese Super League	24	3	2	1	-		-		26	4
Hangzhou Greentown	2013	Chinese Super League	20	0	1	0	-		-		21	0
Hangzhou Greentown	2014	Chinese Super League	25	2	1	0	-		-		26	2
Hangzhou Greentown	2015	Chinese Super League	25	1	0	0	-		-		25	1
Hangzhou Greentown	2016	Chinese Super League	22	1	0	0	-		-		22	1
Hangzhou Greentown	Total		116	7	4	1	0	0	0	0	120	8
Henan Jianye (loan)	2017	Chinese Super League	14	0	2	0	-		-		16	0
Hebei China Fortune/ Hebei FC	2018	Chinese Super League	1	0	0	0	-		-		1	0
Hebei China Fortune/ Hebei FC	2019	Chinese Super League	11	0	1	0	-		-		12	0
Hebei China Fortune/ Hebei FC	2020	Chinese Super League	5	0	1	0	-		-		6	0
Hebei China Fortune/ Hebei FC	2021	Chinese Super League	4	0	1	0	-		-		5	0
Hebei China Fortune/ Hebei FC	Total		21	0	3	0	0	0	0	0	24	0
Zhejiang Energy Greentown (loan)	2020	China League One	2	0	0	0	-		-		2	0
Shaanxi Chang'an Athletic	2022	China League One	6	0	0	0	-		-		6	0
Qingdao Youth Island	2022	China League One	12	1	1	0	-		-		13	1
Shanghai Jiading Huilong	2023	China League One	8	1	0	0	-		-		8	1
Qingdao West Coast	2023	China League One	16	0	0	0	-		-		16	0
Qingdao West Coast	2024	Chinese Super League	24	1	0	0	-		-		24	1
Qingdao West Coast	2025	Chinese Super League	5	0	2	0	-		-		7	0
Qingdao West Coast	Total		45	1	2	0	0	0	0	0	47	1
Career total			230	10	12	1	0	0	0	0	242	11
