= Chen Ji (footballer) =

Chinese footballer (born 1997)

Chen Ji 陈吉
Personal information
- Full name: Chen Ji
- Date of birth: 5 January 1997 (age 29)
- Place of birth: Wuhan, Hubei, China
- Height: 1.78 m (5 ft 10 in)
- Position: Left winger

Youth career
- 2011–2013: Wuhan Zall
- 2014–2016: Jiangsu Suning

Senior career*
Years	Team	Apps	(Gls)
2016–2018	Jiangsu Suning	9	(0)
2018	→ Guizhou Hengfeng (loan)	21	(0)
2019–2021	Guizhou Hengfeng	30	(0)
2022	Hubei Istar	11	(1)
2023	Wuhan Jiangcheng	14	(6)
2024	Qingdao Red Lions	4	(0)
2025	Hubei Istar	11	(1)
- * Club domestic league appearances and goals as of 5 May 2022

Chen Ji (simplified Chinese: 陈吉; traditional Chinese: 陳吉; pinyin: Chén Jí; born 5 January 1997) is a Chinese footballer.

== Club career ==
Chen Ji joined Chinese Super League side Jiangsu Sainty's youth academy in 2014 after his unsuccessful trial in Portugal. He was promoted to the first team squad in the summer of 2016 by manager Choi Yong-soo. On 29 April 2017, he made his senior debut in a 2–2 away defeat against Tianjin Quanjian as the benefit of the new rule of the league that at least one Under-23 player must be in the starting line-up and was substituted off in the 15th minute. He scored his first senior goal in his second appearance on 2 May 2017 in the 2017 Chinese FA Cup as Jiangsu beat League Two side Jiangxi Liansheng 1–0.

On 26 February 2018, Chen was loaned to fellow Super League side Guizhou Hengfeng until 31 December 2018. On 11 March 2019, he made his debut for the club in a 3–2 home loss against Hebei China Fortune. He made 20 league appearances in the 2018 season as Guizhou Hengfeng eventually finished the bottom of the league and relegated to the China League One. Chen made a permanent transfer to Guizhou Zhicheng in February 2019.

== Career statistics ==
Statistics accurate as of match played 31 December 2020.

Appearances and goals by club, season and competition
Club	Season	League			National Cup		Continental		Other		Total	
Club	Season	Division	Apps	Goals	Apps	Goals	Apps	Goals	Apps	Goals	Apps	Goals
Jiangsu Suning	2016	Chinese Super League	0	0	0	0	0	0	-		0	0
Jiangsu Suning	2017	Chinese Super League	9	0	3	1	1	0	-		13	1
Jiangsu Suning	Total		9	0	3	1	1	0	0	0	13	1
Guizhou Hengfeng (loan)	2018	Chinese Super League	21	0	3	0	-		-		24	0
Guizhou Hengfeng	2019	China League One	17	0	1	0	-		-		18	0
Career total			47	0	7	1	1	0	0	0	55	1
