= 2018 Changchun Yatai F.C. season =

Changchun Yatai F.C.
2018 season
- Manager: Chen Jingang
- Stadium: Changchun Stadium
- Super League: 15th (Relegated）
- FA Cup: Fourth Round
- Top goalscorer: League: Odion Ighalo(21 goals); All: Odion Ighalo(21 goals)

The 2018 Changchun Yatai F.C. season is Changchun's 13th consecutive season in the Chinese Super League. Changchun will also be competing in the Chinese FA Cup. This season Yatai moved back to Changchun Stadium, where they won their first league title in 2007, as the club's home ground, after spending 9 seasons at Development Area Stadium.

On 11 November, Yatai suffered shock relegation after losing 0–2 to Dalian Yifang as they have gone through almost the entire season with being considered as completely safe. They got 32 points this season, the joint highest from a relegated team of CSL history, together with Zhejiang Greentown in 2016; They scored 45 goals, which is the highest of all relegated teams in a single season of CSL history. Star player and captain Odion Ighalo scored 21 goals in this campaign, which is second highest of the season, and also the highest of any player from a relegated team in a single season of CSL history.

== Players ==
=== First team squad ===
As of 19 July 2018

Note: Flags indicate national team as defined under FIFA eligibility rules; some limited exceptions apply. Players may hold more than one non-FIFA nationality.

No.	Pos.	Nation	Player
1	GK	CHN	Liu Yu
3	DF	CHN	Xiao Yufeng
4	DF	CHN	Yu Rui
6	MF	CHN	Xue Ya'nan
8	MF	CHN	Du Zhenyu
9	FW	NGR	Odion Ighalo
10	FW	DEN	Lasse Vibe
11	MF	POL	Adrian Mierzejewski
13	GK	CHN	Yi Fan
15	DF	CHN	Sun Jie
16	DF	CHN	Jiang Zhe
17	MF	CHN	Fan Xiaodong
18	MF	CHN	Han Zilong
19	MF	CHN	Cao Ziheng
20	FW	CHN	Tan Tiancheng
21	MF	CHN	He Chao

No.	Pos.	Nation	Player
23	GK	CHN	Wu Yake
24	DF	CHN	Yan Zhiyu
25	MF	CHN	Zhang Hengyuan
26	DF	CHN	Zuo Yiteng
27	MF	CHN	Zhang Li
29	FW	CHN	Tan Long
30	FW	CHN	Zhao Mingyu
31	FW	CHN	Cheng Changcheng
32	MF	CHN	Li Guang
33	DF	CHN	Zhang Xiaofei (Captain)
35	GK	CHN	Gao Yuqin
36	MF	CHN	Cui Jingming
37	MF	CHN	Zhou Dadi
38	MF	CHN	Wang Shouting (on loan from Shanghai Shenhua)
39	DF	SRB	Nemanja Pejčinović

== Competitions ==
=== Chinese Super League ===
==== League table ====
Pos	Team	Pld	W	D	L	GF	GA	GD	Pts	Qualification or relegation
12	Henan Jianye	30	10	4	16	30	45	−15	34	
13	Chongqing Dangdai Lifan	30	8	8	14	40	46	−6	32 (Note: Chongqing Dangdai Lifan, Tianjin TEDA and Changchun Yatai were ranked by head-to-head points: Chongqing Dangdai Lifan 7 pts, Tianjin Teda 5 pts, Changchun Yatai 4 pts.)	
14	Tianjin TEDA	30	8	8	14	41	54	−13	32	
15	Changchun Yatai (R)	30	8	8	14	45	56	−11	32	Relegation to League One
16	Guizhou Hengfeng (R)	30	7	3	20	34	66	−32	24	Relegation to League One

Source: League table
Rules for classification: 1) Points; 2) Head-to-head points; 3) Head-to-head goal difference; 4) Head-to-head goals scored; 5) Reserve league points; 6) U19 Elite league points; 7) Goal difference; 8) Goals scored; 9) Disciplinary points (1 point for each yellow card, 3 points for each red card); 10) Draw
(R) Relegated

=== Results summary ===
Overall								Home						Away					
Pld	W	D	L	GF	GA	GD	Pts	W	D	L	GF	GA	GD	W	D	L	GF	GA	GD
8	3	2	3	14	14	0	11	2	1	1	7	4	+3	1	1	2	7	10	−3

Last updated: 30 April 2018.
Source: See Results

=== Results ===
2 March 2018 1	Shanghai Shenhua	1–1	Changchun Yatai	Shanghai
19:35 (UTC+8)	Romero 28'	Report	Fan Xiaodong 62'	Stadium: Hongkou Football Stadium; Attendance: 21,098; Referee: Ai Kun

9 March 2018 2	Guangzhou Evergrande Taobao	5–0	Changchun Yatai	Guangzhou
19:35 (UTC+8)	Gao Lin 52'; Goulart 60', 65'; Alan 79', 84'	Report		Stadium: Tianhe Sports Centre Stadium; Attendance: 47,693; Referee: Zhao Zhizhi

18 March 2018 3	Changchun Yatai	1–1	Beijing Renhe	Changchun
15:30 (UTC+8)	Ighalo 41'	Report	Wang Gang 29'	Stadium: Changchun Stadium; Attendance: 21,386; Referee: Shen Yinhao

31 March 2018 4	Changchun Yatai	1–2	Guangzhou R&F	Changchun
15:30 (UTC+8)	Ighalo (penalty missed) 11'; Zhang Xiaofei 61'; Yu Rui (red card) 90+6'; Du Zhenyu (penalty missed) 90+9'	Report	Zahavi 78'; Renatinho 90+7' (pen.)	Stadium: Changchun Stadium; Attendance: 19,860; Referee: Ma Li

7 April 2018 5	Hebei China Fortune	2–1	Changchun Yatai	Langfang
19:35 (UTC+8)	Gui Hong 28'; Lavezzi 58'	Report	Du Zhenyu 88'	Stadium: Langfang Stadium; Attendance: 18,113; Referee: Li Haixin

15 April 2018 6	Changchun Yatai	3–0	Henan Jianye	Changchun
15:30 (UTC+8)	Sun Jie 3'; Vibe 47'; Tan Long 83'	Report		Stadium: Changchun Stadium; Attendance: 21,851; Referee: Guan Xing

21 April 2018 7	Guizhou Hengfeng	2–5	Changchun Yatai	Guiyang
19:35 (UTC+8)	Du Wei 33'; Wang Fan 60'	Report	Ighalo 24' (pen.), 38', 86', 90+3'; Tan Long 35'	Stadium: Guiyang Olympic Sports Center; Attendance: 15,783; Referee: Guo Baolong

29 April 2018 8	Changchun Yatai	2–1	Shanghai SIPG	Changchun
19:35 (UTC+8)	Ighalo 14', 69'	Report	Wu Lei 41'; Hulk (penalty missed) 77'	Stadium: Changchun Stadium; Attendance: 25,966; Referee: Lin Jun

6 May 2018 9	Jiangsu Suning	2–0	Changchun Yatai	Nanjing
19:35 (UTC+8)	Teixeira 32'; Huang Zichang 53'	Report		Stadium: Nanjing Olympic Sports Centre; Attendance: 29,179; Referee: Ai Kun

12 May 2018 10	Changchun Yatai	0-1	Tianjin TEDA	Changchun
15:30 (UTC+8)		Report	Acheampong 81'	Stadium: Changchun Stadium; Attendance: 17，395; Referee: Wang Jing

19 May 2018 12	Changchun Yatai	0-2	Beijing Sinobo Guoan	Changchun
15:30 (UTC+8)		Report	Soriano 16' (pen.); Bakambu 70'	Stadium: Changchun Stadium; Attendance: 20,766; Referee: Li Haixin

=== Chinese FA Cup ===
24 April 2018 4th round	Sichuan Jiuniu	1 - 1 (4 - 3 p)	Changchun Yatai	Zigong
16:00 CST	Xiao Yufeng 43' (o.g.)	Report	Cheng Changcheng (red card) 58'; Tan Tiancheng 60' (pen.)	Stadium: Nanhu Sports Center; Referee: Qin Xiaohan

== See also ==
- 2018 Chinese Super League
