= Zhang Yue (footballer, born 1999) =

Chinese footballer

Personal information
- Date of birth: 16 November 1999 (age 26)
- Place of birth: Taizhou, Zhejiang, China
- Height: 1.83 m (6 ft 0 in)
- Positions: Left-back; winger

Team information
- Current team: Lanzhou Longyuan Athletic
- Number: 25

Youth career
- –2015: Cornellà
- 2015–2016: Beijing Renhe
- 2017–2018: Sinđelić Beograd
- 2021: Cangzhou Mighty Lions

Senior career*
Years	Team	Apps	(Gls)
2018–2020	Sinđelić Beograd	28	(2)
2018	→ Bežanija (loan)	4	(0)
2021–2023	Cangzhou Mighty Lions	2	(0)
2024–2026	Xiamen Feilu	34	(14)
2026–	Lanzhou Longyuan Athletic	3	(1)
- * Club domestic league appearances and goals as of 29 July 2026

Zhang Yue (simplified Chinese: 张越; traditional Chinese: 張越; pinyin: Zhāng Yuè; born 16 November 1999) is a Chinese footballer currently playing as a left-back or winger for China League Two side Lanzhou Longyuan Athletic.

== Club career ==
Zhang Yue would go abroad to further his football development and would play for Spanish side Cornellà's youth team. He would continue to his youth development abroad with Serbian side Sinđelić Beograd where he would be promoted to their senior team before being loaned out to fellow second tier Serbian club Bežanija on 31 August 2018. At Bežanija he would make his professional debut in a league game on 22 September 2018 against Budućnost Dobanovci in a 2-0 victory. After a run of games he was brought back to Sinđelić Beograd for the remainder of the 2018–19 Serbian First League campaign. He would go on to make his debut for Sinđelić Beograd in a league game on 11 March 2019 against Inđija in a 0-0 draw.

On 1 January 2021, Zhang returned to China to join top tier club Cangzhou Mighty Lions and was incorporated into the clubs youth and reserve team before being promoted into the senior team at the start of the 2022 Chinese Super League season. He would make his debut for the club in a Chinese FA Cup game on 17 November 2022 against Yanbian Longding in a 5-1 victory, where he also scored his first goal for the club.

On 10 July 2026, Zhang transferred to China League Two side Lanzhou Longyuan Athletic.

== Career statistics ==
As of 29 July 2026.

Club	Season	League			Cup		Continental		Other		Total	
Club	Season	Division	Apps	Goals	Apps	Goals	Apps	Goals	Apps	Goals	Apps	Goals
Sinđelić Beograd	2018–19	Serbian First League	7	1	0	0	–		–		7	1
Sinđelić Beograd	2019–20	Serbian First League	21	1	0	0	–		–		21	1
Sinđelić Beograd	Total		28	2	0	0	0	0	0	0	28	2
Bežanija (loan)	2018–19	Serbian First League	4	0	1	0	–		–		5	0
Cangzhou Mighty Lions	2022	Chinese Super League	1	0	3	1	–		–		4	1
Cangzhou Mighty Lions	2023	Chinese Super League	1	0	1	0	–		–		2	0
Cangzhou Mighty Lions	Total		2	0	4	1	0	0	0	0	6	1
Xiamen Feilu	2024	CMCL	13	5	–		–		–		13	5
Xiamen Feilu	2025	CMCL	13	9	–		–		–		13	9
Xiamen Feilu	2026	China League Two	8	0	0	0	–		–		8	0
Xiamen Feilu	Total		34	14	0	0	0	0	0	0	34	14
Lanzhou Longyuan Athletic	2026	China League Two	3	1	1	0	–		–		4	1
Career total			71	17	6	1	0	0	0	0	77	18
