= Yang Pengju =

Chinese association football player

Personal information
- Date of birth: 6 June 2000 (age 26)
- Place of birth: Guiyang, Guizhou, China
- Height: 1.88 m (6 ft 2 in)
- Position: Defender

Team information
- Current team: Jiangxi Lushan
- Number: 18

Youth career
- Valencia

Senior career*
Years	Team	Apps	(Gls)
2021–2023	Dalian Pro	0	(0)
2021	→ Beijing BSU (loan)	11	(0)
2022	→ Zibo Cuju (loan)	10	(0)
2023	→ Shijiazhuang Gongfu (loan)	1	(0)
2024	Ganzhou Ruishi	5	(0)
2024	Rizhao Yuqi	2	(0)
2025	Xiamen 1026	13	(1)
2026–	Jiangxi Lushan	17	(1)
- * Club domestic league appearances and goals as of 07:25, 6 August 2026 (UTC)

Yang Pengju (Chinese: 杨鹏举; born 6 June 2000) is a Chinese footballer currently playing as a defender for Jiangxi Lushan.

== Club career ==
Yang Pengju was invited to join the academy of Valencia as part of the Wanda Group initiative to bring young Chinese players to Spanish clubs. On his return he would join Wanda Group owned Dalian Pro in the 2021 Chinese Super League season where he was promoted to their senior team before being loaned out to second tier club Beijing BSU. He would go on to make his debut for them in a league game on 12 July 2021 against Zhejiang in a 1-0 victory.

== Career statistics ==
As of 6 August 2026.

Club	Season	League			Cup		Continental		Other		Total	
Club	Season	Division	Apps	Goals	Apps	Goals	Apps	Goals	Apps	Goals	Apps	Goals
Dalian Pro	2021	Chinese Super League	0	0	0	0	-		0 (Note: Appearance(s) in Promotion/Relegation Play-offs)	0	0	0
Beijing BSU (loan)	2021	China League One	11	0	2	0	-		-		13	0
Zibo Cuju (loan)	2022	China League One	10	0	1	0	-		-		11	0
Shijiazhuang Gongfu (loan)	2023	China League One	1	0	0	0	-		-		1	0
Ganzhou Ruishi	2024	China League Two	5	0	1	0	-		-		6	0
Rizhao Yuqi	2024	China League Two	2	0	0	0	-		-		2	0
Xiamen 1026	2025	CMCL	13	1	-		-		-		13	1
Jiangxi Lushan	2026	China League Two	17	1	0	0	-		-		17	1
Career total			59	2	4	0	0	0	0	0	63	2
