= 2026 China League Two =

China League Two
- Season: 2026
- Dates: 21 March – 8 November
- Champions: Dalian Kewei
- Promoted: Dalian Kewei; Shandong Taishan B Guizhou Guiyang Athletic
- Relegated: Wenzhou; Chengdu Rongcheng B Beijing IT; Shanghai Second

The 2026 C'estbon Chinese Football League 2 (Chinese: 2026怡宝中国足球乙级联赛) was the 37th season of China League Two, the third tier of the Chinese football league pyramid, since its establishment in 1989.

== Clubs ==
=== Club changes ===
==== To League Two ====
Teams promoted from 2025 Chinese Champions League

- Xiamen 1026
- Shanghai Second
- Dalian Kewei

Teams promoted from 2025 Chinese Youth Football Elite League (Division U21)

- Dalian Yingbo B

Teams relegated from 2025 China League One

- Guangxi Pingguo
- Qingdao Red Lions

==== From League Two ====
Teams promoted to 2026 China League One

- Guangxi Hengchen
- Wuxi Wugo

Teams relegated to 2026 Chinese Champions League

- Kunming City
- Quanzhou Yassin
- Guangxi Lanhang

Disqualified entries

- ~~Guangxi Pingguo~~

=== Name changes ===
- Guizhou Zhucheng Athletic F.C. changed their name to Guizhou Guiyang Athletic in January 2026.
- Xiamen 1026 F.C. changed their name to Xiamen Feilu in January 2026.
- Guangzhou Dandelion Alpha F.C. changed their name to Guangzhou Dandelion before the start of the season.

=== Stadiums and locations ===
Locations of the 2026 China League Two teams
North Group South Group
Locations of the 2026 China League Two in Guangdong

Team	Head coach	City	Stadium	Capacity	2025 season
Qingdao Red Lions ^{R}	(China) Zhang Yang	Qingdao	Qingdao Tiantai Stadium	20,525	CL1, 16th
Shenzhen 2028	(China) Wang Baoshan	Shenzhen	Shenzhen Youth Football Training Base Centre Stadium	10,000	3rd
Chengdu Rongcheng B	(China) Xu Jianye	Chengdu	Shuangliu Sports Centre	26,000	4th
Guizhou Guiyang Athletic	(China) Chen Long	Guiyang	Guiyang Olympic Sports Center	51,636	5th
Nantong Haimen Codion	(China) Gao Wanguo	Nantong	Haimen Sports Centre	15,000	6th
Shandong Taishan B	(China) Zhang Haitao	Jinan	Linyi Olympic Sports Park (Linyi)	57,000	7th
Changchun Xidu	(China) Li Bin	Changchun	Yatai Training Center Main Stadium	7,000	8th
Jiangxi Lushan	(South Korea) Choi Jin-han	Ruichang	Ruichang Sports Park Stadium	13,188	9th
Hangzhou Linping Wuyue	(China) Xu Lei	Hangzhou	Linping Sports Centre Stadium	10,200	10th
Guangzhou Dandelion	(Japan) Kenichi Uemura	Guangzhou (Huadu)	Huadu Stadium	13,394	11th
Tai'an Tiankuang	(China) Qu Wenbo	Tai'an	Wenhe Sports Park Football Stadium	2,500	12th
Lanzhou Longyuan Athletic	(China) Zhang Xiaorui	Lanzhou	Lanzhou Olympic Center Stadium	60,000	13th
Wuhan Three Towns B	(China) Chang Weiwei	Wuhan	Hankou Cultural Sports Centre	20,000	14th
Shanghai Port B	(China) Cheng Yaodong	Shanghai (Fengxian)	Lingang Football Complex Sports Center	2,300	15th
Shanxi Chongde Ronghai	(China) Cao Rui	Taiyuan	Taiyuan University Football Field	2,257	16th
Wenzhou	(China) Zhao Peng (caretaker)	Wenzhou	Wenzhou Sports Centre	18,000	17th
Beijing IT	(China) Yu Fei	Beijing	BIT Eastern Athletic Field	5,000	18th
Ganzhou Ruishi	(China) Li Xiaoting	Ganzhou	Ganzhou Fitness Center	40,000	19th
Guangdong Mingtu	(Spain) Ander Sanabria	Guangzhou (Yuexiu)	Guangdong Provincial People's Stadium	15,000	20th
Xiamen Feilu ^{P}	(China) Wang Hao (de facto) (China) Lü Hongchen (de jure)	Xiamen	Haicang District Sports Center Stadium; Xiamen Sports Center Stadium	15,755; 32,000	CMCL, 1st
Shanghai Second ^{P}	(Serbia) Marko Dimitrijevic	Shanghai (Fengxian)	Lingang Football Complex Sports Center	2,300	CMCL, 2nd
Dalian Kewei ^{P}	(China) Xu Hui	Dalian (Zhongshan)	Dalian Football Youth Training Center	5,000	CMCL, 3rd
Dalian Yingbo B ^{P}	(China) Zhou Ting	Dalian	Puwan New District Stadium	30,000	U21 League, 1st (Promotion play-offs winner)
Hubei Istar	(China) Wan Houliang	Wuhan	Hubei Sports Bureau Football Administration Center Football Field	2,000	21st

== North Group ==
=== League table ===
Pos	Team	Pld	W	D	L	GF	GA	GD	Pts	Qualification
1	Shandong Taishan B	22	12	5	5	33	21	+12	41	Qualification for Promotion stage
2	Shanghai Port B	22	12	4	6	36	19	+17	40	Qualification for Promotion stage
3	Shanxi Chongde Ronghai	22	12	4	6	29	17	+12	40	Qualification for Promotion stage
4	Dalian Kewei	22	9	10	3	22	14	+8	37	Qualification for Promotion stage
5	Tai'an Tiankuang	22	8	7	7	25	23	+2	31	Qualification for Relegation stage
6	Dalian Yingbo B	22	6	10	6	21	22	−1	28	Qualification for Relegation stage
7	Nantong Haimen Codion	22	5	11	6	25	23	+2	26	Qualification for Relegation stage
8	Lanzhou Longyuan Athletic	22	4	14	4	13	16	−3	26	Qualification for Relegation stage
9	Qingdao Red Lions	22	5	10	7	22	20	+2	25	Qualification for Relegation stage
10	Changchun Xidu	22	3	11	8	15	28	−13	20	Qualification for Relegation stage
11	Beijing IT	22	3	7	12	21	42	−21	16	Qualification for Relegation stage
12	Shanghai Second	22	2	9	11	22	39	−17	15	Qualification for Relegation stage

Source: Soccerway
Rules for classification:
- During season: 1) Points; 2) Head-to-head points; 3) Head-to-head goal difference; 4) Head-to-head goals scored; 5) Goal difference; 6) Goals scored; 7) Rankings in the previous season. (Rules 2 to 4 are only applied when teams concerned have finished both/all the matches against others.)
- After season: 1) Points; 2) Head-to-head points; 3) Head-to-head goal difference; 4) Head-to-head goals scored; 5) Goal difference; 6) Goals scored; 7) Disciplinary points (yellow card = 1 point, red card = 3 points); 8) Drawing of lots.

=== Results ===
Home \ Away	BIT	CCX	DLK	DLY	LLA	NHC	QRL	SDT	SHP	SHS	SCR	TAT
Beijing IT	—	2–2	0–1	1–1	0–1	1–2	1–1	1–3	0–2	2–1	1–2	1–1
Changchun Xidu	0–0	—	2–1	0–1	0–0	0–0	1–1	1–1	0–2	0–1	1–2	1–0
Dalian Kewei	0–0	3–0	—	2–0	2–2	1–0	1–0	2–1	1–0	1–1	0–0	1–0
Dalian Yingbo B	3–4	2–2	0–0	—	1–1	2–1	0–0	2–0	1–2	3–2	1–2	0–1
Lanzhou Longyuan Athletic	1–0	0–0	0–0	0–0	—	0–0	1–0	0–3	1–0	2–2	0–0	2–2
Nantong Haimen Codion	2–2	4–0	1–2	0–0	0–0	—	1–1	2–2	2–2	2–2	1–1	2–1
Qingdao Red Lions	6–1	1–1	0–0	1–1	0–0	0–1	—	0–1	2–1	2–2	1–0	1–1
Shandong Taishan B	4–1	1–1	2–2	0–1	3–1	0–0	1–0	—	0–1	2–1	1–0	1–3
Shanghai Port B	5–1	2–1	0–0	0–0	1–0	2–1	2–0	1–3	—	1–1	0–1	2–3
Shanghai Second	0–1	1–1	1–1	1–2	2–1	0–2	0–2	1–2	1–6	—	0–2	0–0
Shanxi Chongde Ronghai	2–0	3–0	2–0	2–0	0–0	2–0	2–3	0–1	0–3	2–0	—	3–2
Tai'an Tiankuang	2–1	0–1	2–1	0–0	0–0	2–1	1–0	0–1	0–1	2–2	2–1	—

Source: Soccerway
Legend: Blue = home team win; Yellow = draw; Red = away team win.
For upcoming matches, an "a" indicates there is an article about the rivalry between the two participants.

=== Positions by round ===
To preserve chronological evolvements, any postponed matches are not included to the round at which they were originally scheduled, but added to the full round they were played immediately afterwards. For example, if a match is scheduled for round 7, but then played between rounds 8 and 9, it will be added to the standings for round 8.

Team ╲ Round	1	2	3	4	5	6	7	8	9	10	11	12	13	14	15	16	17	18	19	20	21	22
Shandong Taishan B	11	6	3	2	2	2	2	2	3	3	4	3	2	2	2	1	1	1	2	1	1	1
Shanghai Port B	1	1	2	1	1	1	1	1	1	1	1	1	1	1	1	2	2	2	1	3	4	2
Shanxi Chongde Ronghai	9	10	10	9	9	6	6	7	5	5	5	6	6	6	4	4	4	4	3	2	2	3
Dalian Kewei	6	4	6	4	4	4	4	4	4	4	3	4	4	3	3	3	3	3	4	4	3	4
Tai'an Tiankuang	2	2	1	3	3	3	3	3	2	2	2	2	3	4	5	5	5	5	5	5	5	5
Dalian Yingbo B	7	3	4	5	5	5	5	6	8	6	6	5	5	5	6	6	6	6	6	6	6	6
Nantong Haimen Codion	8	8	7	8	8	8	7	9	6	7	7	7	7	8	8	8	8	8	8	9	7	7
Lanzhou Longyuan Athletic	3	5	5	6	6	7	8	5	7	8	9	9	9	9	9	9	9	9	9	7	8	8
Qingdao Red Lions	5	9	8	10	10	10	10	11	12	10	8	8	8	7	7	7	7	7	7	8	9	9
Changchun Xidu	4	7	9	7	7	9	9	10	10	11	11	11	11	11	10	10	10	10	10	10	10	10
Beijing IT	10	11	12	12	12	11	12	12	11	12	12	12	12	12	12	12	12	12	12	12	12	11
Shanghai Second	12	12	11	11	11	12	11	8	9	9	10	10	10	10	11	11	11	11	11	11	11	12

Qualification for Promotion stage
Qualification for Relegation stage

Source: Soccerway

=== Results by match played ===
Team ╲ Round	1	2	3	4	5	6	7	8	9	10	11	12	13	14	15	16	17	18	19	20	21	22
Beijing IT	L	L	L	L	D	D	D	L	W	D	D	L	L	D	L	L	L	L	L	W	D	W
Changchun Xidu	D	D	L	W	D	L	D	L	L	D	L	D	D	D	W	L	L	D	D	L	D	W
Dalian Kewei	D	W	D	W	D	D	D	W	D	L	W	L	D	W	W	D	W	W	D	D	W	L
Dalian Yingbo B	D	W	D	D	D	L	D	D	L	W	D	W	W	D	D	W	L	L	L	D	W	L
Lanzhou Longyuan Athletic	W	D	D	L	D	D	L	W	D	L	D	W	D	D	L	D	D	D	D	D	W	D
Nantong Haimen Codion	D	L	W	L	D	D	D	L	W	D	D	L	D	D	L	W	D	L	W	D	W	D
Qingdao Red Lions	D	L	D	D	L	D	D	L	L	W	W	D	D	W	D	L	L	W	D	D	W	L
Shandong Taishan B	L	W	W	W	W	W	D	L	L	L	D	W	W	W	W	W	W	D	D	W	L	D
Shanghai Port B	W	W	D	W	W	W	W	D	W	W	L	D	D	L	W	L	W	L	W	L	L	W
Shanghai Second	L	L	D	L	D	L	W	W	L	D	D	D	L	L	L	D	L	D	D	L	L	D
Shanxi Chongde Ronghai	D	L	L	W	L	W	D	W	W	L	D	W	W	L	W	W	W	W	W	W	L	D
Tai'an Tiankuang	W	W	W	L	D	D	L	W	W	W	D	L	L	D	L	D	W	W	L	D	L	D

Source: Soccerway
W = Win; D = Draw; L = Loss

== South Group ==
=== League table ===
Pos	Team	Pld	W	D	L	GF	GA	GD	Pts	Qualification
1	Guizhou Guiyang Athletic	22	13	3	6	32	17	+15	42	Qualification for Promotion stage
2	Shenzhen 2028	22	10	7	5	37	25	+12	37	Qualification for Promotion stage
3	Jiangxi Lushan	22	10	5	7	25	19	+6	35	Qualification for Promotion stage
4	Hangzhou Linping Wuyue	22	8	10	4	25	28	−3	34	Qualification for Promotion stage
5	Hubei Istar	22	9	7	6	29	23	+6	34	Qualification for Relegation stage
6	Xiamen Feilu	22	7	8	7	29	28	+1	29	Qualification for Relegation stage
7	Guangdong Mingtu	22	5	11	6	22	20	+2	26	Qualification for Relegation stage
8	Ganzhou Ruishi	22	6	8	8	19	32	−13	26	Qualification for Relegation stage
9	Guangzhou Dandelion	22	6	7	9	22	28	−6	25	Qualification for Relegation stage
10	Chengdu Rongcheng B	22	5	7	10	18	24	−6	22	Qualification for Relegation stage
11	Wenzhou	22	4	10	8	15	23	−8	22	Qualification for Relegation stage
12	Wuhan Three Towns B	22	4	7	11	20	26	−6	19	Qualification for Relegation stage

Source: Soccerway
Rules for classification:
- During season: 1) Points; 2) Head-to-head points; 3) Head-to-head goal difference; 4) Head-to-head goals scored; 5) Goal difference; 6) Goals scored; 7) Rankings in the previous season. (Rules 2 to 4 are only applied when teams concerned have finished both/all the matches against others.)
- After season: 1) Points; 2) Head-to-head points; 3) Head-to-head goal difference; 4) Head-to-head goals scored; 5) Goal difference; 6) Goals scored; 7) Disciplinary points (yellow card = 1 point, red card = 3 points); 8) Drawing of lots.

=== Results ===
Home \ Away	CDR	GZR	GDM	GZD	GGA	HLW	HBI	JXL	SHZ	WZH	WTT	XMF
Chengdu Rongcheng B	—	0–0	1–1	0–0	1–2	1–1	3–2	0–1	3–1	1–2	0–1	5–1
Ganzhou Ruishi	1–1	—	0–2	1–3	0–1	1–1	4–4	1–1	3–0	1–1	1–0	2–1
Guangdong Mingtu	2–0	0–0	—	1–2	0–0	1–1	1–2	0–0	2–2	0–0	3–0	1–2
Guangzhou Dandelion	2–0	2–0	1–2	—	0–0	1–1	2–3	2–1	1–2	0–0	1–4	1–3
Guizhou Guiyang Athletic	0–0	3–0	1–0	2–0	—	7–0	2–1	1–2	1–0	1–0	3–1	1–0
Hangzhou Linping Wuyue	0–0	0–1	1–0	2–3	4–3	—	1–0	2–1	0–0	0–0	1–1	2–2
Hubei Istar	3–0	2–1	0–0	1–0	2–0	0–1	—	0–1	1–2	1–1	1–1	2–2
Jiangxi Lushan	1–0	0–1	0–0	2–0	2–0	2–2	0–1	—	1–2	3–1	2–1	0–2
Shenzhen 2028	1–0	6–0	3–1	3–1	2–1	3–1	0–1	0–2	—	4–0	1–1	3–3
Wenzhou	0–1	0–1	1–1	0–0	0–2	0–1	1–2	1–1	1–1	—	2–1	1–0
Wuhan Three Towns B	0–1	4–0	0–1	0–0	0–1	0–1	0–0	0–2	1–1	1–1	—	2–1
Xiamen Feilu	2–0	0–0	3–3	0–0	2–0	1–2	0–0	2–0	0–0	0–2	2–1	—

Source: Soccerway
Legend: Blue = home team win; Yellow = draw; Red = away team win.
For upcoming matches, an "a" indicates there is an article about the rivalry between the two participants.

=== Positions by round ===
To preserve chronological evolvements, any postponed matches are not included to the round at which they were originally scheduled, but added to the full round they were played immediately afterwards. For example, if a match is scheduled for round 7, but then played between rounds 8 and 9, it will be added to the standings for round 8.

Team ╲ Round	1	2	3	4	5	6	7	8	9	10	11	12	13	14	15	16	17	18	19	20	21	22
Guizhou Guiyang Athletic	12	5	3	6	5	2	1	2	1	1	1	1	1	1	1	1	1	1	1	1	1	1
Shenzhen 2028	6	10	12	10	6	6	7	6	7	6	5	4	3	3	3	2	2	2	2	2	2	2
Jiangxi Lushan	5	6	9	7	8	9	6	5	4	5	4	5	6	6	5	5	5	5	4	3	3	3
Hangzhou Linping Wuyue	4	7	6	5	7	7	8	9	9	9	9	10	11	8	7	7	7	7	6	5	4	4
Hubei Istar	3	2	5	3	2	3	3	1	2	3	3	2	2	2	2	3	3	3	3	4	5	5
Xiamen Feilu	1	1	4	4	4	5	5	4	3	2	2	3	4	4	4	4	4	4	7	7	6	6
Guangdong Mingtu	9	12	10	11	12	11	11	11	10	10	10	8	9	10	9	9	9	8	8	8	7	7
Ganzhou Ruishi	8	9	8	8	9	8	9	8	6	7	7	7	5	5	6	6	6	6	5	6	8	8
Guangzhou Dandelion	10	3	1	1	1	1	2	3	5	4	6	6	7	7	8	8	8	9	9	9	9	9
Chengdu Rongcheng B	2	4	2	2	3	4	4	7	8	8	8	9	10	11	11	11	11	11	10	10	10	10
Wenzhou	11	11	11	12	11	10	10	12	12	12	11	11	8	9	10	10	10	10	11	11	11	11
Wuhan Three Towns B	7	8	7	9	10	12	12	10	11	11	12	12	12	12	12	12	12	12	12	12	12	12

Qualification for Promotion stage
Qualification for Relegation stage

Source: Soccerway

=== Results by match played ===
Team ╲ Round	1	2	3	4	5	6	7	8	9	10	11	12	13	14	15	16	17	18	19	20	21	22
Chengdu Rongcheng B	W	L	W	W	D	D	D	L	L	L	L	L	D	L	L	D	D	L	W	W	D	L
Ganzhou Ruishi	D	D	D	L	D	W	L	W	W	L	W	L	W	W	D	D	D	L	D	L	L	L
Guangdong Mingtu	D	L	D	L	L	D	D	L	D	W	D	W	D	L	W	D	D	W	D	D	W	L
Guangzhou Dandelion	L	W	W	W	W	L	D	D	L	W	L	L	D	L	L	D	L	D	L	D	W	D
Guizhou Guiyang Athletic	L	W	W	L	W	W	W	L	W	W	W	W	D	L	L	W	W	W	W	L	D	D
Hangzhou Linping Wuyue	D	D	D	W	L	D	D	L	L	W	D	W	L	W	D	D	D	W	D	W	W	W
Hubei Istar	W	D	L	W	W	D	D	W	W	L	L	W	D	W	D	L	W	D	D	L	L	W
Jiangxi Lushan	D	D	L	W	L	D	W	W	W	L	W	L	L	W	W	W	D	L	D	W	L	W
Shenzhen 2028	D	D	L	D	W	W	L	W	L	W	W	D	W	W	D	D	W	W	L	W	D	L
Wenzhou	L	D	D	L	L	D	D	L	D	L	W	W	W	L	D	L	L	D	D	D	D	W
Wuhan Three Towns B	D	D	D	L	L	L	D	D	L	L	L	D	L	L	W	W	L	D	W	L	L	W
Xiamen Feilu	W	D	D	D	W	L	D	W	W	W	L	L	D	W	D	L	D	L	L	D	W	L

Source: Soccerway
W = Win; D = Draw; L = Loss

== Promotion stage ==
=== League table ===
Pos	Team	Pld	W	D	L	GF	GA	GD	Pts	Promotion
1	Dalian Kewei (C, P)	30	14	13	3	35	20	+15	55	Promotion to League One
2	Shandong Taishan B (P)	30	15	9	6	43	28	+15	54	Promotion to League One
3	Guizhou Guiyang Athletic (O, P)	30	15	6	9	38	24	+14	51	Qualification for Promotion Play-offs
4	Shanxi Chongde Ronghai	30	15	6	9	35	24	+11	51	
5	Shanghai Port B	30	15	6	9	44	26	+18	51	
6	Shenzhen 2028	30	12	9	9	43	34	+9	45	
7	Hangzhou Linping Wuyue	30	9	15	6	32	39	−7	42	
8	Jiangxi Lushan	30	12	6	12	33	29	+4	42	

Source: [ Soccerway]
Rules for classification:
- During season: 1) Points; 2) Head-to-head points; 3) Head-to-head goal difference; 4) Head-to-head goals scored; 5) Goal difference; 6) Goals scored; 7) Rankings in the previous season. (Rules 2 to 4 are only applied when teams concerned have finished both/all the matches against others.)
- After season: 1) Points; 2) Head-to-head points; 3) Head-to-head goal difference; 4) Head-to-head goals scored; 5) Goal difference; 6) Goals scored; 7) Disciplinary points (yellow card = 1 point, red card = 3 points); 8) Drawing of lots.
  (C) Champions; (O) Play-off winners; (P) Promoted

=== Results ===
Home \ Away	DLK	GGA	HLW	JXL	SDT	SHP	SCR	SHZ
Dalian Kewei		2–1	2–2	2–1				0–0
Guizhou Guiyang Athletic	0–1				1–1	2–1	1–0	
Hangzhou Linping Wuyue	1–4				0–0	0–2	0–0	
Jiangxi Lushan	0–1				2–1	0–0	3–1	
Shandong Taishan B		1–1	0–0	2–1				3–2
Shanghai Port B		0–0	2–3	1–0				2–1
Shanxi Chongde Ronghai		1–0	1–1	2–1				1–0
Shenzhen 2028	1–1				0–2	1–0	1–0	

Source: [ Soccerway]
Legend: Blue = home team win; Yellow = draw; Red = away team win.
For upcoming matches, an "a" indicates there is an article about the rivalry between the two participants.

=== Positions by round ===
To preserve chronological evolvements, any postponed matches are not included to the round at which they were originally scheduled, but added to the full round they were played immediately afterwards. For example, if a match is scheduled for round 7, but then played between rounds 8 and 9, it will be added to the standings for round 8.

Team ╲ Round	23	24	25	26	27	28	29	30
Dalian Kewei	6	6	5	5	3	4	2	1
Shandong Taishan B	3	4	3	4	4	1	1	2
Guizhou Guiyang Athletic	2	3	2	3	5	5	5	3
Shanxi Chongde Ronghai	5	2	4	2	2	3	4	4
Shanghai Port B	1	1	1	1	1	2	3	5
Shenzhen 2028	4	5	6	6	6	6	6	6
Hangzhou Linping Wuyue	7	8	8	8	8	7	7	7
Jiangxi Lushan	8	7	7	7	7	8	8	8

Leader and promotion to League One
Promotion to League One
Qualification for Promotion Play-offs

Source: [ Soccerway]

=== Results by match played ===
Team ╲ Round	23	24	25	26	27	28	29	30
Dalian Kewei	W	D	W	D	W	D	W	W
Guizhou Guiyang Athletic	L	L	W	D	L	W	D	D
Hangzhou Linping Wuyue	D	L	D	D	D	W	D	L
Jiangxi Lushan	L	W	L	L	D	L	L	W
Shandong Taishan B	D	L	W	D	D	W	W	D
Shanghai Port B	W	W	L	W	D	L	D	L
Shanxi Chongde Ronghai	L	W	D	W	W	L	D	L
Shenzhen 2028	W	D	L	L	L	D	L	W

Source: [ Soccerway]
W = Win; D = Draw; L = Loss

== Relegation stage ==
=== Group A ===
==== League table ====
Pos	Team	Pld	W	D	L	GF	GA	GD	Pts	Relegation
1	Hubei Istar	30	10	11	9	35	31	+4	41	
2	Dalian Yingbo B	30	9	13	8	31	28	+3	40	
3	Lanzhou Longyuan Athletic	30	8	16	6	22	22	0	40	
4	Guangdong Mingtu	30	8	15	7	29	25	+4	39	
5	Changchun Xidu	30	6	15	9	21	32	−11	33	
6	Guangzhou Dandelion	30	7	11	12	28	35	−7	32	
7	Wenzhou (R)	30	6	12	12	19	33	−14	30	Relegation to CMCL
8	Shanghai Second (R)	30	3	14	13	27	46	−19	23	Relegation to CMCL

Source: [ Soccerway]
Rules for classification:
- During season: 1) Points; 2) Head-to-head points; 3) Head-to-head goal difference; 4) Head-to-head goals scored; 5) Goal difference; 6) Goals scored; 7) Rankings in the previous season. (Rules 2 to 4 are only applied when teams concerned have finished both/all the matches against others.)
- After season: 1) Points; 2) Head-to-head points; 3) Head-to-head goal difference; 4) Head-to-head goals scored; 5) Goal difference; 6) Goals scored; 7) Disciplinary points (yellow card = 1 point, red card = 3 points); 8) Drawing of lots.
  (R) Relegated

==== Results ====
Home \ Away	CCX	DLY	GDM	GZD	HBI	LLA	SHS	WZH
Changchun Xidu			0–0	1–1	1–0			0–1
Dalian Yingbo B			1–2	1–0	1–1			4–0
Guangdong Mingtu	0–0	1–1				0–1	1–0	
Guangzhou Dandelion	0–0	1–2				1–2	3–1	
Hubei Istar	1–2	0–0				2–0	1–1	
Lanzhou Longyuan Athletic			1–2	0–0	3–1			2–0
Shanghai Second			1–1	0–0	0–0			1–1
Wenzhou	1–2	1–0				0–0	0–1	

Source: [ Soccerway]
Legend: Blue = home team win; Yellow = draw; Red = away team win.
For upcoming matches, an "a" indicates there is an article about the rivalry between the two participants.

==== Positions by round ====
To preserve chronological evolvements, any postponed matches are not included to the round at which they were originally scheduled, but added to the full round they were played immediately afterwards. For example, if a match is scheduled for round 7, but then played between rounds 8 and 9, it will be added to the standings for round 8.

Team ╲ Round	23	24	25	26	27	28	29	30
Hubei Istar	1	1	1	1	1	1	1	1
Dalian Yingbo B	4	3	2	3	2	2	3	2
Lanzhou Longyuan Athletic	3	2	3	4	4	4	4	3
Guangdong Mingtu	2	4	4	2	3	3	2	4
Changchun Xidu	7	7	7	6	5	5	5	5
Guangzhou Dandelion	5	5	5	5	6	6	6	6
Wenzhou	6	6	6	7	7	7	7	7
Shanghai Second	8	8	8	8	8	8	8	8

Relegation to CMCL

Source: [ Soccerway]

==== Results by match played ====
Team ╲ Round	23	24	25	26	27	28	29	30
Changchun Xidu	W	D	D	W	W	D	D	L
Dalian Yingbo B	L	W	D	D	W	W	L	D
Guangdong Mingtu	W	D	D	W	D	D	W	L
Guangzhou Dandelion	L	L	D	W	D	L	D	D
Hubei Istar	L	D	W	D	L	D	L	D
Lanzhou Longyuan Athletic	W	W	L	L	D	D	W	W
Shanghai Second	L	D	D	L	D	D	W	D
Wenzhou	W	L	D	L	L	D	L	W

Source: [ Soccerway]
W = Win; D = Draw; L = Loss

=== Group B ===
==== League table ====
Pos	Team	Pld	W	D	L	GF	GA	GD	Pts	Relegation
1	Nantong Haimen Codion	30	11	13	6	41	26	+15	46	
2	Tai'an Tiankuang	30	11	11	8	35	27	+8	44	
3	Xiamen Feilu	30	9	11	10	37	34	+3	38	
4	Qingdao Red Lions	30	8	11	11	27	30	−3	35	
5	Ganzhou Ruishi	30	7	10	13	23	46	−23	31	
6	Wuhan Three Towns B	30	7	9	14	28	33	−5	30	
7	Chengdu Rongcheng B (R)	30	6	11	13	26	36	−10	29	Relegation to Division U21
8	Beijing IT (R)	30	5	11	14	29	53	−24	26	Relegation to CMCL

Source: [ Soccerway]
Rules for classification:
- During season: 1) Points; 2) Head-to-head points; 3) Head-to-head goal difference; 4) Head-to-head goals scored; 5) Goal difference; 6) Goals scored; 7) Rankings in the previous season. (Rules 2 to 4 are only applied when teams concerned have finished both/all the matches against others.)
- After season: 1) Points; 2) Head-to-head points; 3) Head-to-head goal difference; 4) Head-to-head goals scored; 5) Goal difference; 6) Goals scored; 7) Disciplinary points (yellow card = 1 point, red card = 3 points); 8) Drawing of lots.
  (R) Relegated

==== Results ====
Home \ Away	BIT	CDR	GZR	NHC	QRL	TAT	WTT	XMF
Beijing IT		2–0	1–0				0–3	2–2
Chengdu Rongcheng B	1–1			1–3	1–1	1–1		
Ganzhou Ruishi	1–1			1–1	2–1	0–3		
Nantong Haimen Codion		1–1	3–0				3–0	2–0
Qingdao Red Lions		0–2	1–0				0–2	1–0
Tai'an Tiankuang		3–1	3–0				0–0	0–0
Wuhan Three Towns B	1–1			0–2	0–1	2–0		
Xiamen Feilu	3–0			0–1	3–0	0–0		

Source: [ Soccerway]
Legend: Blue = home team win; Yellow = draw; Red = away team win.
For upcoming matches, an "a" indicates there is an article about the rivalry between the two participants.

==== Positions by round ====
To preserve chronological evolvements, any postponed matches are not included to the round at which they were originally scheduled, but added to the full round they were played immediately afterwards. For example, if a match is scheduled for round 7, but then played between rounds 8 and 9, it will be added to the standings for round 8.

Team ╲ Round	23	24	25	26	27	28	29	30
Nantong Haimen Codion	4	3	2	2	1	1	1	1
Tai'an Tiankuang	1	1	1	1	2	2	2	2
Xiamen Feilu	2	2	3	3	3	3	3	3
Qingdao Red Lions	3	5	5	5	5	4	4	4
Ganzhou Ruishi	5	4	4	4	4	5	5	5
Wuhan Three Towns B	7	7	7	7	6	6	6	6
Chengdu Rongcheng B	6	6	6	6	7	7	8	7
Beijing IT	8	8	8	8	8	8	7	8

Relegation to Division U21
Relegation to CMCL

Source: [ Soccerway]

==== Results by match played ====
Team ╲ Round	23	24	25	26	27	28	29	30
Beijing IT	W	L	W	D	D	D	D	L
Chengdu Rongcheng B	D	D	L	D	L	L	D	W
Ganzhou Ruishi	L	W	L	D	D	L	L	L
Nantong Haimen Codion	D	W	W	D	W	W	W	W
Qingdao Red Lions	W	L	L	D	L	W	W	L
Tai'an Tiankuang	D	D	W	D	L	W	W	D
Wuhan Three Towns B	D	L	W	D	W	L	L	W
Xiamen Feilu	L	W	L	D	W	D	L	D

Source: [ Soccerway]
W = Win; D = Draw; L = Loss

== Promotion play-offs ==
Team 1	Agg.	Team 2	1st leg	2nd leg
Guizhou Guiyang Athletic	–	Jiangxi Dingnan United	3–1	–

15 November 2026
15:00 UTC+8

Guizhou Guiyang Athletic	3–1	Jiangxi Dingnan United

Zunyi Olympic Sports Centre Stadium, Zunyi
Referee: Qiu Zhaojun

22 November 2026
15:30 UTC+8

Jiangxi Dingnan United	v	Guizhou Guiyang Athletic

Dingnan Youth Football Training Center, Dingnan
