= Song Haiwang =

Chinese association football player

Personal information
- Date of birth: 20 February 1995 (age 31)
- Place of birth: Zhengzhou, Henan, China
- Height: 1.77 m (5 ft 10 in)
- Position: Midfielder

Team information
- Current team: Xiamen Feilu

Youth career
- –2018: Zhejiang Greentown

Senior career*
Years	Team	Apps	(Gls)
2016–2018	Zhejiang Greentown	2	(0)
2019–2022	Henan Jianye	5	(0)
2021	→ Quanzhou Yassin (loan)	20	(4)
2023–2025	Xiamen Feilu	13	(2)
- * Club domestic league appearances and goals as of 14:47, 31 December 2025 (UTC)

Song Haiwang (Chinese: 宋海旺; born 20 February 1995) is a Chinese former footballer who played as a midfielder for Zhejiang Greentown, Henan Jianye, Quanzhou Yassin and Xiamen Feilu.

== Club career ==
Song Haiwang was promoted to the senior team of Zhejiang Greentown within the 2016 Chinese Super League season and would make his debut in a Chinese FA Cup game on 12 May 2016 against Dalian Boyang F.C. in a 1-0 victory where he came on as a substitute for Luo Jing. Unfortunately Song would be part of the squad that saw Zhejiang get relegated at the end of the season. Within the lower level Song could not establish himself as a regular within the team and was allowed to leave the club to join top tier club Henan Jianye where he would make his debut on 19 August 2020 in a league game against Shandong Luneng Taishan F.C. in a 2-1 defeat.

== Career statistics ==
As of 31 December 2025.

Club	Season	League			National Cup		Continental		Other		Total	
Club	Season	Division	Apps	Goals	Apps	Goals	Apps	Goals	Apps	Goals	Apps	Goals
Zhejiang Greentown	2016	Chinese Super League	0	0	1	0	–		0	0	1	0
Zhejiang Greentown	2017	China League One	0	0	1	0	–		0	0	1	0
Zhejiang Greentown	2018	China League One	2	0	1	0	–		0	0	3	0
Zhejiang Greentown	Total		2	0	3	0	0	0	0	0	5	0
Henan Jianye	2019	Chinese Super League	0	0	0	0	–		–		0	0
Henan Jianye	2020	Chinese Super League	5	0	1	0	–		–		6	0
Henan Jianye	2022	Chinese Super League	0	0	0	0	–		–		0	0
Henan Jianye	Total		5	0	1	0	0	0	0	0	6	0
Quanzhou Yassin (loan)	2021	China League Two	20	4	0	0	–		–		20	4
Xiamen Feilu	2023	CMCL	?	?	–		–		–		?	?
Xiamen Feilu	2024	CMCL	12	2	–		–		–		12	2
Xiamen Feilu	2025	CMCL	1	0	–		–		–		1	0
Xiamen Feilu	Total		13	2	0	0	0	0	0	0	13	2
Career total			40	6	4	0	0	0	0	0	44	6
