= Xiao Yufeng =

Chinese footballer (born 1995)

Xiao Yufeng 肖煜峰
Personal information
- Full name: Xiao Yufeng
- Date of birth: 23 January 1995 (age 31)
- Place of birth: Fushun, Liaoning, China
- Height: 1.85 m (6 ft 1 in)
- Position: Defender

Team information
- Current team: Rizhao Yuqi
- Number: 4

Youth career
- 2006–2014: Changchun Yatai
- 2011–2012: → Varzim (loan)
- 2013: → Sacavenense (loan)

Senior career*
Years	Team	Apps	(Gls)
2015–2016	Loures	0	(0)
2016–2018	Cova da Piedade	0	(0)
2016–2017	→ Oriental (loan)	8	(0)
2017–2018	→ Tourizense (loan)	6	(0)
2018–2021	Changchun Yatai	26	(1)
2021-2022	Tai'an Huawei	-	(-)
2022-2023	Wuxi Wugou	5	(1)
2023	Tai'an Tiankuang	18	(0)
2024-	Rizhao Yuqi	51	(4)
- * Club domestic league appearances and goals as of 24 July 2026

Xiao Yufeng (Chinese: 肖煜峰; pinyin: Xiāo Yùfēng; born 23 January 1995) is a Chinese footballer who currently plays for Rizhao Yuqi in the Chinese League Two.

== Club career ==
Xiao Yufeng joined Chinese Super League side Changchun Yatai's youth academy in 2006. He moved aboard under the Chinese Football Association's 500.com Stars Project in 2011. He joined Varziml and Sacavenense's youth academy between 2011 and 2013. Xiao signed for Campeonato de Portugal side Loures in the summer of 2015. He transferred to Cova da Piedade in 2016 and was loaned to Oriental and Tourizense in the following two seasons.

Xiao returned to Changchun Yatai in February 2018. On 9 March 2018, he made his debut for the club in a 5–0 away defeat against Guangzhou Evergrande Taobao, coming on as a substitute for Sun Jie in the 82nd minute. On 29 September 2018, he scored his goal for the club in a 5–2 home defeat against Jiangsu Suning.

== Career statistics ==
As of 24 July 2026.

Appearances and goals by club, season and competition
Club	Season	League			National Cup		Continental		Other		Total	
Club	Season	Division	Apps	Goals	Apps	Goals	Apps	Goals	Apps	Goals	Apps	Goals
Loures	2015–16	Campeonato de Portugal	0	0	0	0	-		-		0	0
Oriental (loan)	2016–17	Campeonato de Portugal	8	0	2	1	-		-		10	1
Tourizense (loan)	2017–18	Coimbra FA Division of Honour	6	0	1 (Note: Appearances in Taça de Coimbra)	0	-		-		7	0
Changchun Yatai	2018	Chinese Super League	14	1	1	0	-		-		15	1
Changchun Yatai	2019	China League One	12	0	0	0	-		-		12	0
Changchun Yatai	2020	China League One	0	0	1	0	-		-		1	0
Changchun Yatai	Total		26	1	2	0	0	0	0	0	28	1
Tai'an Huawei	2021	Chinese Champions League	-		-		-		-		-	
Wuxi Wugou	2022	China League Two	5	1	-		-		-		5	1
Wuxi Wugou	2023	China League One	0	0	0	0	-		-		0	0
Wuxi Wugou	Total		5	1	0	0	0	0	0	0	5	1
Tai'an Tiankuang	2023	China League Two	18	0	2	0	-		-		20	0
Rizhao Yuqi/ Lanzhou Longyuan Athletic	2024	China League Two	21	4	1	0	-		-		22	4
Rizhao Yuqi/ Lanzhou Longyuan Athletic	2025	China League Two	22	0	1	0	-		-		23	0
Rizhao Yuqi/ Lanzhou Longyuan Athletic	2026	China League Two	8	0	2	1	-		-		10	1
Rizhao Yuqi/ Lanzhou Longyuan Athletic	Total		51	4	4	1	0	0	0	0	55	5
Career total			114	6	11	2	0	0	0	0	125	2

== Honours ==
=== Club ===
Changchun Yatai

- China League One: 2020
