= Dalian Kewei F.C. =

Dalian Kewei
- Full name: Dalian Kewei Football Club
- Ground: Dalian Football Youth Training Base
- Manager: Xu Hui
- League: China League One
- 2026: China League Two, 1st of 24 (promoted)

Dalian Kewei Football Club (simplified Chinese: 大连可为足球俱乐部; traditional Chinese: 大連可為足球俱樂部; pinyin: Dàlián Kěwéi Zúqiú Jùlèbù) is a Chinese professional football club based in Dalian, Liaoning, that competes in China League One, the second tier of Chinese football.

== History ==
In March 2025, the club was based at the Dalian Football Youth Training Base and began preparations for the 2025 Chinese Champions League (CMCL). The club's general manager, Yu Ziqian, set the goal of promotion to the professional leagues for the 2025 season.

In the 2025 CMCL regional qualifiers, Dalian Kewei was placed in the Rizhao division. The club won all three group matches and defeated Heilongjiang Longyue Bingcheng and Jinan Tiansheng in the promotion round to advance to the national finals.

In the 2025 CMCL national finals, Dalian Kewei was placed in the North Division alongside fellow Dalian club Dalian Hanyu. The two clubs faced each other in the opening round on 30 August 2025, drawing 1–1 at the Dalian Football Youth Training Base. In the knockout stage, the club defeated Wuhua Huajing in the first round (4–2 on aggregate) and Chongqing Chunlei in the second round (3–2 on aggregate).

In the final round of the knockout stage, Dalian Kewei faced Dalian Hanyu in a two-legged "Dalian Derby" for promotion to China League Two. On 16 November 2025, Dalian Kewei won the first leg 2–1 at the Dalian Youth Football Training Base. In the second leg on 23 November 2025, Dalian Kewei lost 0–1 at the Puwan New District Stadium but progressed with a 2–2 aggregate score due to their superior ranking in the finals group stage. The club finished third in the 2025 CMCL and secured direct promotion to the 2026 China League Two.

On 2 March 2026, the club officially announced that the Dalian Football Youth Training Base would serve as their home ground for the 2026 China League Two season.

In the 2026 China League Two season, Dalian Kewei was placed in the North Division. As of June 2026, the club was in 4th place in the division with 4 wins, 6 draws, and 1 loss from 11 matches. The club also participated in the 2026 Chinese FA Cup, defeating Shanxi Longsheng 3–1 in the first round and Nantong Zhiyun 2–1 in the second round, before defeating Liaoning Tieren 1–0 in the third round.

== Players ==
=== Current squad ===
As of 20 June 2026

Note: Flags indicate national team as defined under FIFA eligibility rules; some limited exceptions apply. Players may hold more than one non-FIFA nationality.

No.	Pos.	Nation	Player
1	GK	CHN	Zhang Chong
2	DF	CHN	Zhang Zhen
3	DF	CHN	Yu Yanhao
4	DF	CHN	Liu Jiaxin
5	DF	CHN	Fu Yunlong
6	DF	CHN	Liu Xiaolong
7	DF	CHN	Tang Junhao
8	MF	CHN	Dilxat Ablimit
9	MF	CHN	Liu Zhizhi
11	FW	CHN	Ge Yuxiang
12	DF	CHN	Li Wuze
13	GK	CHN	Yan Xiaoyu
14	DF	CHN	Li Zhen
16	GK	CHN	Wang Shihan
17	MF	CHN	Shi Kaiyu

No.	Pos.	Nation	Player
20	FW	CHN	Zhang Xianbing
23	MF	CHN	Liu Hongchen
25	DF	CHN	Fang Peicheng
27	MF	CHN	Li Yang
29	FW	CHN	Chen Yongze
30	MF	CHN	Yu Zeyuan
31	MF	CHN	Baihetiyar
32	DF	CHN	Zhang Tianlong
33	FW	CHN	Cheng Changcheng
35	DF	CHN	Wang Peng
37	DF	CHN	Huang Jianming
38	MF	CHN	Zhang Zichao
39	FW	CHN	Zhang Dachi

== Honours ==
=== League ===
- Chinese Champions League
  - Third place: 2025

=== Individual ===
- CMCL Best Coach: Xu Hui (2025)
- CMCL Silver Boot: Zhang Dachi (2025)

== Managerial history ==
- Xu Hui (2025–present)
