= Huang Shibo =

Chinese footballer

Huang Shibo 黄世博
Personal information
- Date of birth: 16 June 1987 (age 39)
- Place of birth: Xiamen, Fujian, China
- Height: 1.70 m (5 ft 7 in)
- Position: Midfielder

Youth career
- Xiamen Blue Lions

Senior career*
Years	Team	Apps	(Gls)
2006–2007	Xiamen Blue Lions	0	(0)
2011–2016	Shijiazhuang Ever Bright	128	(6)
2017–2022	Hangzhou Greentown	54	(3)
2023–2024	Xiamen 1026		

Managerial career
- 2024: Xiamen 1026
- 2026: Lanzhou Longyuan Athletic
- * Club domestic league appearances and goals as of 1 December 2022

Huang Shibo (Chinese: 黄世博; pinyin: Huáng Shìbó; born 16 June 1987) is a Chinese football manager and former player.

== Club career ==
Huang Shibo was promoted to Chinese Super League side Xiamen Blue Lions's first team squad in 2006. He left the club in the middle of 2007 season due to dissatisfaction with low salary. He became a restaurant manager and played for the local amateur club Xiamen Dongyuhang between 2007 and 2010. In 2011, he signed a professional contract with the newly founded Fujian Smart Hero, followed the club to move to Shijiazhuang in 2013 and finally returned to Chinese Super League in 2015 season. On 9 March 2015, he made his Super League debut in the season's first match which Shijiazhuang lost to Guangzhou Evergrande 2–1, coming on as a substitute for Mao Jianqing in the 57th minute.

On 5 January 2017, Huang moved to League One side Hangzhou Greentown. He would make his debut on 8 April 2017 in a league game against Dalian Transcendence that ended in a 1–0 defeat. This would be followed by his first goal for the club on 19 April 2017 in a Chinese FA Cup game against Shenzhen Ledman F.C. that ended in a 1–0 victory. For several seasons he would establish himself as a regular within the team and would be part of the squad that gained promotion to the top tier at the end of the 2021 campaign.

== Career statistics ==
Statistics accurate as of match played 1 December 2022.

Appearances and goals by club, season and competition
Club	Season	League			National Cup		Continental		Other		Total	
Club	Season	Division	Apps	Goals	Apps	Goals	Apps	Goals	Apps	Goals	Apps	Goals
Xiamen Blue Lions	2006	Chinese Super League	0	0	0	0	-		-		0	0
Xiamen Blue Lions	2007	Chinese Super League	0	0	-		-		-		0	0
Xiamen Blue Lions	Total		0	0	0	0	0	0	0	0	0	0
Shijiazhuang Ever Bright	2011	China League Two	17	1	-		-		-		17	1
Shijiazhuang Ever Bright	2012	China League One	27	2	1	0	-		-		28	2
Shijiazhuang Ever Bright	2013	China League One	30	1	2	0	-		-		32	1
Shijiazhuang Ever Bright	2014	China League One	22	2	0	0	-		-		22	2
Shijiazhuang Ever Bright	2015	Chinese Super League	16	0	1	0	-		-		17	0
Shijiazhuang Ever Bright	2016	Chinese Super League	16	0	2	0	-		-		18	0
Shijiazhuang Ever Bright	Total		128	6	6	0	0	0	0	0	134	6
Hangzhou Greentown	2017	China League One	11	1	1	1	-		-		12	2
Hangzhou Greentown	2018	China League One	25	2	1	0	-		-		26	2
Hangzhou Greentown	2019	China League One	15	0	2	0	-		-		17	0
Hangzhou Greentown	2020	China League One	2	0	0	0	-		1 (Note: Appearance(s) in CSL Relegation play-offs)	0	3	0
Hangzhou Greentown	2021	China League One	1	0	1	0	-		0	0	2	0
Hangzhou Greentown	Total		54	3	5	1	0	0	1	0	60	4
Career total			182	9	11	1	0	0	1	0	194	10
