= Liu Xiaolong (footballer) =

Chinese footballer

Liu Xiaolong 刘小龙
Personal information
- Date of birth: 16 February 1989 (age 37)
- Place of birth: Dalian, Liaoning, China
- Height: 1.80 m (5 ft 11 in)
- Position: Left-back

Team information
- Current team: Dalian Kewei
- Number: 6

Youth career
- Harbin Yiteng

Senior career*
Years	Team	Apps	(Gls)
2007–2018	Zhejiang Yiteng	148	(6)
2019–2021	Meizhou Hakka	16	(0)
2021	→ Guangxi Pingguo Haliao (loan)	10	(1)
2022–2024	Ganzhou Ruishi	24	(0)
2025–	Dalian Kewei	5	(0)
- * Club domestic league appearances and goals as of 31 December 2022

Liu Xiaolong (Chinese: 刘小龙; born 16 February 1989) is a Chinese football player who currently plays for China League Two side Dalian Kewei

== Club career ==
In 2007, Liu started his professional footballer career with Harbin Yiteng in the China League One division. He was unfortunately part of the squad that was relegated to the third-tier at the end of the 2008 China League One campaign. In the third tier he was able to establish himself within the team and by the 2011 China League Two campaign he would win the division title and promotion back into the second tier. This would be followed by another promotion when the club came runners-up of the 2013 China League One division and gained promotion to the top tier for the first time in the clubs history.

He would make his Chinese Super League debut for Harbin on 7 March 2014 in a game against Shandong Luneng Taishan that ended in a 1-0 defeat. After the game the team struggled within the league and were relegated at the end of the 2014 Chinese Super League season. He would remain loyal to the club until the end of the 2018 China League One season when the club were relegated to the third-tier after failing to apply for a League One license, despite finishing 12th in the season.

Liu transferred to fellow League One side Meizhou Hakka in December 2018. He would make his debut in a league game on 16 March 2019 against Xinjiang Tianshan Leopard in a 4-0 victory. After two seasons where he was utilised as a squad player, Liu would join third tier club Guangxi Pingguo Haliao on loan before joining another third tier club in Shaoxing Shangyu Pterosaur.

== Career statistics ==
Statistics accurate as of match played 31 December 2022.

Club	Season	League			National Cup		Continental		Other		Total	
Club	Season	Division	Apps	Goals	Apps	Goals	Apps	Goals	Apps	Goals	Apps	Goals
Harbin Yiteng	2007	China League One	1	0	-		-		-		1	0
Harbin Yiteng	2008	China League One	0	0	-		-		-		0	0
Harbin Yiteng	2009	China League Two			-		-		-			
Harbin Yiteng	2010	China League Two			-		-		-			
Harbin Yiteng	2011	China League Two	13	4	-		-		-		13	4
Harbin Yiteng	2012	China League One	19	1	1	0	-		-		20	1
Harbin Yiteng	2013	China League One	18	0	2	1	-		-		20	1
Harbin Yiteng	2014	Chinese Super League	23	0	0	0	-		-		23	0
Harbin Yiteng	2015	China League One	9	0	0	0	-		-		9	0
Harbin Yiteng	2016	China League One	15	0	1	0	-		-		16	0
Harbin Yiteng	2017	China League One	28	1	1	0	-		-		29	1
Harbin Yiteng	2018	China League One	22	0	0	0	-		-		22	0
Harbin Yiteng	Total		148	6	5	1	0	0	0	0	153	7
Meizhou Hakka	2019	China League One	13	0	1	0	-		-		14	0
Meizhou Hakka	2020	China League One	3	0	0	0	-		-		3	0
Meizhou Hakka	Total		16	0	1	0	0	0	0	0	17	0
Guangxi Pingguo Haliao (loan)	2021	China League Two	10	1	2	0	-		-		12	1
Shaoxing Shangyu Pterosaur	2022	China League Two	10	0	-		-		-		10	0
Career total			184	7	8	1	0	0	0	0	192	8

== Honours ==
=== Club ===
Harbin Yiteng

- China League Two: 2011
