= Zhang Tianlong =

Chinese footballer

Zhang Tianlong 张天龙
Personal information
- Date of birth: 26 February 1992 (age 34)
- Place of birth: Jinzhou, Liaoning, China
- Height: 1.80 m (5 ft 11 in)
- Positions: Left-back; centre-back

Team information
- Current team: Dalian Kewei
- Number: 32

Youth career
- 2005–2010: Shandong Luneng

Senior career*
Years	Team	Apps	(Gls)
2011	Guangzhou Evergrande	0	(0)
2012–2014	Shenzhen Ruby	26	(0)
2014–2018	Liaoning FC	1	(0)
2017	→ Nei Mongol Zhongyou (loan)	22	(2)
2018	Nei Mongol Zhongyou	21	(0)
2019	Liaoning FC	11	(0)
2020	Taizhou Yuanda	11	(0)
2021	Nantong Zhiyun	26	(0)
2022	Qingdao Hainiu	27	(0)
2023	Qingdao West Coast	6	(0)
2023	Nanjing City	9	(0)
2024	Ganzhou Ruishi	25	(0)
2025	Jiangxi Dingnan United	13	(0)
2025–	Dalian Kewei	5	(1)

International career
2006–2008	China U-17		
- * Club domestic league appearances and goals as of 25 December 2022

Zhang Tianlong (Chinese: 张天龙; pinyin: Zhāng Tiānlóng; born 26 February 1992) is a Chinese football player who currently plays as a left-back or centre-back for Dalian Kewei.

== Club career ==
Zhang joined Chinese Super League newcomer Guangzhou Evergrande from Shandong Luneng youth academy in 2011. He transferred to China League One side Shenzhen Ruby in February 2012. He made his senior debut on 17 Match 2012 in a 1–0 away win against Beijing Baxy.

Zhang transferred to his hometown club Liaoning with his teammate Ding Haifeng in February 2014. He was sent to the reserved team in 2015. On 18 September 2016, he made his debut for Liaoning in a 6–2 away defeat against Guangzhou Evergrande. In February 2017, Zhang was loaned to Nei Mongol Zhongyou for the 2017 season. He made his debut for the club on 18 March 2017 in a 5–0 away defeat against Shanghai Shenxin. On 22 April 2017, he scored his first senior goal in a 1–1 away draw against Meizhou Hakka. He made a permanent transfer to Nei Mongol Zhongyou in 2018.

Zhang transferred back to Liaoning on 28 February 2019. His return was not a happy one, his wages were paid late after the club admitted they were in financial difficulties. After helping guide the club avoid relegation the team disbanded at the end of the 2019 China League One campaign due to wage arrears. He would join another second tier club in Taizhou Yuanda the following season, however he faced the same challenges and was free to leave for Nantong Zhiyun, after the club disbanded at the end of the 2020 China League One campaign.

On 13 April 2022, Zhang transferred to second tier club Qingdao Hainiu. He would go on to make his debut in a league game on 9 June 2022 against Shaanxi Chang'an Athletic in a 1-1 draw. He would go on to establish himself as regular within the team that gained promotion to the top tier at the end of the 2022 China League One campaign.

== Career statistics ==
As of 5 November 2023.

Appearances and goals by club, season and competition
Club	Season	League			National Cup		Continental		Other		Total	
Club	Season	Division	Apps	Goals	Apps	Goals	Apps	Goals	Apps	Goals	Apps	Goals
Guangzhou Evergrande	2011	Chinese Super League	0	0	0	0	-		-		0	0
Shenzhen Ruby	2012	China League One	18	0	1	0	-		-		19	0
Shenzhen Ruby	2013	China League One	8	0	0	0	-		-		8	0
Shenzhen Ruby	Total		26	0	1	0	0	0	0	0	27	0
Liaoning Whowin	2014	Chinese Super League	0	0	0	0	-		-		0	0
Liaoning Whowin	2016	Chinese Super League	1	0	0	0	-		-		1	0
Liaoning Whowin	Total		1	0	0	0	0	0	0	0	1	0
Nei Mongol Zhongyou (loan)	2017	China League One	22	2	3	0	-		-		25	2
Nei Mongol Zhongyou	2018	China League One	21	0	0	0	-		-		21	0
Liaoning Whowin	2019	China League One	11	0	0	0	-		0 (Note: Appearance(s) in CL1 Relegation play-offs)	0	11	0
Taizhou Yuanda	2020	China League One	11	0	1	0	-		-		12	0
Nantong Zhiyun	2021	China League One	26	0	1	0	-		-		27	0
Qingdao Hainiu	2022	China League One	27	0	1	0	-		-		28	0
Qingdao West Coast	2023	China League One	6	0	1	0	-		-		7	0
Nanjing City	2023	China League One	9	0	-		-		-		9	0
Career Total			160	2	8	0	0	0	0	0	168	2
