= Dilxat Ablimit =

Chinese association football player

Personal information
- Date of birth: 31 August 1999 (age 27)
- Place of birth: Korla, Xinjiang, China
- Height: 1.75 m (5 ft 9 in)
- Position: Midfielder

Team information
- Current team: Dalian Kewei
- Number: 8

Youth career
- –2018: Huizhou Huixin

Senior career*
Years	Team	Apps	(Gls)
2019–2021	Xinjiang Tianshan Leopard	50	(0)
2023	Chongqing Tonglianglong	7	(1)
2024	Suzhou Dongwu	5	(0)
2025–	Dalian Kewei	0	(0)
- * Club domestic league appearances and goals as of 14:01, 27 April 2022 (UTC)

Dilxat Ablimit (Chinese: 迪力夏提·阿布力米提; born 31 August 1999) is a Chinese footballer currently playing as a midfielder for Dalian Kewei.

== Career statistics ==
=== Club ===
As of 17 August 2021.

Club	Season	League			Cup		Other		Total	
Club	Season	Division	Apps	Goals	Apps	Goals	Apps	Goals	Apps	Goals
Xinjiang Tianshan Leopard	2019	China League One	10	0	1 (Note: Appearances in the Chinese FA Cup)	0	0	0	11	0
Xinjiang Tianshan Leopard	2020	China League One	13	0	0	0	2 (Note: Appearances in the China League One playoffs)	0	15	0
Xinjiang Tianshan Leopard	2021	China League One	9	0	0	0	0	0	9	0
Career total			32	0	1	0	2	0	35	0
