= Zhang Chong (footballer) =

Chinese footballer

Zhang Chong 张翀
Personal information
- Full name: Zhang Chong
- Date of birth: November 25, 1987 (age 38)
- Place of birth: Dalian, Liaoning, China
- Height: 1.90 m (6 ft 3 in)
- Position: Goalkeeper

Team information
- Current team: Dalian Kewei
- Number: 1

Senior career*
Years	Team	Apps	(Gls)
2005–2012	Dalian Shide	41	(0)
2013–2023	Dalian Pro	247	(0)
2025–	Dalian Kewei	0	(0)

Managerial career
- 2025: Dalian Kewei (goalkeeping)
- * Club domestic league appearances and goals as of 18 January 2024

Zhang Chong (Chinese: 张翀; pinyin: Zhāng Chōng; born November 25, 1987) is a former Chinese professional footballer who plays as a goalkeeper for Dalian Kewei.

== Club career ==
At the beginning of the 2005 Chinese Super League season Zhang Chong would break into the senior team of Dalian Shide F.C. after graduating from their youth team. He would, however have to wait until the 2009 Chinese Super League season before he made his senior debut appearance for Dalian against Qingdao Jonoon on October 31, 2009 in the last game of the season in a 3-1 defeat. For the next two seasons he would then become the second choice goalkeeper behind Sun Shoubo as Dalian finished as mid-table regulars until the 2012 Chinese Super League saw Dalian have difficult start to the season and the manager Nelo Vingada decided to promote Zhang as the club's first choice goalkeeper in a league game on March 24, 2012 in a 2-1 victory against Qingdao Jonoon.

Before the start of the 2013 Chinese Super League season the club would go through a protracted acquisition from local top tier rivals Dalian Aerbin (now named Dalian Pro). He would make his debut for them in a league game on 16 March 2013 against Qingdao Jonoon in a 1-0 defeat. He would go on to establish himself as an integral member of the squad, however the following season would see him be part of the team that was relegated at the end of the 2014 Chinese Super League campaign. He would remain loyal towards the club and go on to eventually help guide the club to win the division and promotion at the end of the 2017 China League One campaign.

On 20 February 2026, Zhang joined Chinese Champions League club Dalian Kewei as player-coach.

== Career statistics ==
As of 31 December 2022.

Appearances and goals by club, season and competition
Club	Season	League			National Cup		League Cup		Continental		Other		Total	
Club	Season	Division	Apps	Goals	Apps	Goals	Apps	Goals	Apps	Goals	Apps	Goals	Apps	Goals
Dalian Shide	2005	Chinese Super League	0	0	0	0	0	0	-		-		0	0
Dalian Shide	2006	Chinese Super League	0	0	0	0	-		0	0	-		0	0
Dalian Shide	2007	Chinese Super League	0	0	-		-		-		-		0	0
Dalian Shide	2008	Chinese Super League	0	0	-		-		-		-		0	0
Dalian Shide	2009	Chinese Super League	1	0	-		-		-		-		1	0
Dalian Shide	2010	Chinese Super League	9	0	-		-		-		-		9	0
Dalian Shide	2011	Chinese Super League	3	0	1	0	-		-		-		4	0
Dalian Shide	2012	Chinese Super League	28	0	1	0	-		-		-		29	0
Dalian Shide	Total		41	0	2	0	0	0	0	0	0	0	43	0
Dalian Yifang / Dalian Pro	2013	Chinese Super League	23	0	5	0	-		-		-		28	0
Dalian Yifang / Dalian Pro	2014	Chinese Super League	30	0	0	0	-		-		-		30	0
Dalian Yifang / Dalian Pro	2015	China League One	21	0	1	0	-		-		-		22	0
Dalian Yifang / Dalian Pro	2016	China League One	29	0	0	0	-		-		-		29	0
Dalian Yifang / Dalian Pro	2017	China League One	30	0	0	0	-		-		-		30	0
Dalian Yifang / Dalian Pro	2018	Chinese Super League	30	0	1	0	-		-		-		31	0
Dalian Yifang / Dalian Pro	2019	Chinese Super League	28	0	2	0	-		-		-		30	0
Dalian Yifang / Dalian Pro	2020	Chinese Super League	17	0	0	0	-		-		-		17	0
Dalian Yifang / Dalian Pro	2021	Chinese Super League	19	0	0	0	-		-		2 (Note: Appearance(s) in Relegation/Promotion Play-offs)	0	21	0
Dalian Yifang / Dalian Pro	2022	Chinese Super League	14	0	1	0	-		-		-		15	0
Dalian Yifang / Dalian Pro	Total		241	0	10	0	0	0	0	0	2	0	232	0
Career total			282	0	12	0	0	0	0	0	2	0	296	0

== Honours ==
=== Club ===
Dalian Pro

- China League One: 2017
