= Lanzhou Olympic Center Stadium =

Multi-purpose stadium in Lanzhou, Gansu, China

- 兰州奥体中心体育场
- Interactive map of Lanzhou Olympic Center Stadium
- Location: Qilihe District, Lanzhou, Gansu, China
- Coordinates: 36.087669°N 103.682956°E
- Owner: Lanzhou Municipal Government
- Operator: Lanzhou Olympic Sports Center Construction and Development Co., Ltd.
- Capacity: 60,000:
- Public transit: 1 at Olympic Sports Center

Construction
- Groundbreaking: 2019-07-27
- Opened: 2022-09-17
- Cost: ¥54.14 billion (total complex)
- Architects: China Aviation Planning and Design Institute
- General contractor: China MCC17 Group Corporation

Website
- www.lanzhouaoti.com

The Lanzhou Olympic Center Stadium is the centerpiece of the Lanzhou Olympic Sports Center, a multi-venue complex in Qilihe District, Lanzhou, China. Designed to host international sports events and cultural performances, it is the largest stadium in Gansu Province and a key venue for the 2022 Gansu Provincial Games.

== Design and construction ==
The stadium is part of the Lanzhou Olympic Sports Center project, which uses a Public-Private Partnership (PPP) model with investment totaling 5.414 billion yuan. The complex covers a total land area of 516,000 square meters with a total construction area of 464,000 square meters. Construction began in July 2019, and the stadium was completed in early 2022.

The design concept is "Flying Flower Dance", inspired by the flying apsaras of Dunhuang and the flowing Yellow River. The stadium is one of the "Five Golden Flowers" complex, which includes the Tulip Gymnasium, Lily Aquatics Center, Lotus Tennis Center, and Orchid Sports Complex. The architectural design integrates golden or light-gray aluminum panels with transparent glass curtain walls.

The project was designed by China Aviation Planning and Design Institute and constructed by China Seventeenth Metallurgical Group. The construction utilized Building Information Modeling (BIM) technology, VR experiences, 5G unmanned tower crane models, and 3D printing for smart construction management. The project won first-class awards in the China Construction Industry Association's BIM competition.

== Facilities ==
The stadium has a seating capacity of 60,000 and a building area of 80,400 square meters. It features a 400-meter running track certified by the International Association of Athletics Federations and a standard football field with natural grass. The venue is equipped with HDTV lighting systems, LED displays, automatic flag-raising systems, and a competition information management system.

The complex is located in the Qilihe District, adjacent to Metro Line 1 and approximately 6 kilometers from Lanzhou West Railway Station.

== Events ==
The stadium served as the main venue for the 15th Gansu Provincial Games in September 2022. The opening ceremony was attended by provincial leaders including Party Secretary Yin Hong and Governor Ren Zhenhe.

In October 2025, the stadium hosted the opening ceremony of the 10th Lanzhou Municipal Games, which featured more than 5,700 athletes.

The stadium has been used for concerts by major artists. Joker Xue held two concerts in August 2025, attracting over 60,000 attendees. In September 2023, G.E.M. and Wang performed at the Le Dong Lanzhou concert.

Since March 2025, the stadium has served as the home venue for Lanzhou Longyuan Athletic F.C. in the Chinese League Two.

== Operations and impact ==
Since opening, the venue has hosted over 20 large-scale events with an average attendance of more than 40,000 spectators per event, totaling over 800,000 visitors. Approximately 60-70% of attendees come from outside Lanzhou, boosting local tourism and consumption in surrounding areas.

The venue operates on a low-price strategy during weekday mornings and afternoons, with rates ranging from 10-25 yuan per hour for sports facilities. It offers free access on New Year's Day and National Fitness Day, serving over 5.7 million citizens annually.
