= Cheng Changcheng =

Chinese football player

Cheng Changcheng 程长城
Personal information
- Full name: Cheng Changcheng
- Date of birth: March 27, 1991 (age 35)
- Place of birth: Dengzhou, Henan, China
- Height: 1.80 m (5 ft 11 in)
- Position: Forward

Team information
- Current team: Dalian Kewei
- Number: 33

Youth career
- Changchun Yatai

Senior career*
| Years | Team | Apps | (Gls) |
| 2010–2025 | Changchun Yatai | 77 | (5) |
| 2014 | → Yinchuan Helanshan (loan) | 11 | (0) |
| 2015 | → Changchun Shenhua (loan) | 1 | (2) |
| 2025 | → Changchun Xidu (loan) | 4 | (0) |
| 2026– | Dalian Kewei | 0 | (0) |
- * Club domestic league appearances and goals as of 8 March 2026

Cheng Changcheng (Chinese: 程长城; pinyin: Chéng Chángchéng, born 27 March 1991) is a Chinese professional footballer who currently plays for China League Two club Dalian Kewei.

== Club career ==
Cheng started his professional football career in 2010 when he was promoted to Chinese Super League side Changchun Yatai's first team. He began to play for the first team in the summer of 2010 as team manager Shen Xiangfu decided to give chances to young players. On 8 August, he made his senior debut in a 1–0 home victory against Jiangsu Sainty, coming on as a substitute for Du Zhenyu in the 80th minute. Sun made 5 league appearances in the 2010 season. However, his playing time reduced in 2011 when he mainly spent his time in the reserve team league. He played 3 league matches in the 2012 season. In March 2014, Cheng moved to China League Two side Yinchuan Helanshan on a one-year loan deal. He was released by Changchun at the end of 2014 season.

On 16 April 2019, Cheng scored his first career goal in a 1–0 away win over Nantong Zhiyun in the third round of 2019 Chinese FA Cup.

On 9 October 2022, Cheng finally scored his first Chinese Super League goal in a 4–1 home defeat against Shanghai Port, 12 years after making his debut in the top division.

== Career statistics ==
Statistics accurate as of match played 1 September 2024.

Appearances and goals by club, season and competition
| Club | Season | League | | | National Cup | | Continental | | Other | | Total | |
| Club | Season | Division | Apps | Goals | Apps | Goals | Apps | Goals | Apps | Goals | Apps | Goals |
|---|---|---|---|---|---|---|---|---|---|---|---|---|
| Changchun Yatai | 2010 | Chinese Super League | 5 | 0 | - | | - | | 0 | 0 | 5 | 0 |
| Changchun Yatai | 2011 | Chinese Super League | 0 | 0 | 0 | 0 | - | | - | | 0 | 0 |
| Changchun Yatai | 2012 | Chinese Super League | 3 | 0 | 0 | 0 | - | | - | | 3 | 0 |
| Changchun Yatai | 2013 | Chinese Super League | 0 | 0 | 1 | 0 | - | | - | | 1 | 0 |
| Changchun Yatai | 2016 | Chinese Super League | 8 | 0 | 1 | 0 | - | | - | | 9 | 0 |
| Changchun Yatai | 2017 | Chinese Super League | 5 | 0 | 1 | 0 | - | | - | | 6 | 0 |
| Changchun Yatai | 2018 | Chinese Super League | 6 | 0 | 1 | 0 | - | | - | | 7 | 0 |
| Changchun Yatai | 2019 | China League One | 5 | 0 | 2 | 1 | - | | - | | 7 | 1 |
| Changchun Yatai | 2020 | China League One | 2 | 0 | 1 | 0 | - | | - | | 3 | 0 |
| Changchun Yatai | 2021 | Chinese Super League | 13 | 0 | 1 | 0 | - | | - | | 14 | 0 |
| Changchun Yatai | 2022 | Chinese Super League | 9 | 3 | 1 | 0 | - | | - | | 10 | 3 |
| Changchun Yatai | 2023 | Chinese Super League | 19 | 2 | 2 | 0 | - | | - | | 21 | 2 |
| Changchun Yatai | 2024 | Chinese Super League | 2 | 0 | 0 | 0 | - | | - | | 2 | 0 |
| Changchun Yatai | Total | | 77 | 5 | 11 | 1 | 0 | 0 | 0 | 0 | 88 | 6 |
| Yinchuan Helanshan (loan) | 2014 | China League Two | 11 | 0 | 1 | 0 | - | | - | | 12 | 0 |
| Changchun Shenhua (loan) | 2015 | CAFL | 1 | 2 | - | | - | | - | | 1 | 2 |
| Career total | | | 89 | 7 | 12 | 1 | 0 | 0 | 0 | 0 | 101 | 8 |

== Honours ==
=== Club ===
Changchun Yatai

- China League One: 2020.
