= Zhang Haitao =

Chinese footballer and coach

Zhang Haitao 张海涛
Personal information
- Full name: Zhang Haitao
- Date of birth: April 11, 1970 (age 56)
- Place of birth: Jinan, Shandong, China
- Height: 1.83 m (6 ft 0 in)
- Position: Defender

Team information
- Current team: Shandong Taishan B (head coach)

Youth career
- 1983–1989: Shandong Team

Senior career*
Years	Team	Apps	(Gls)
1989–1998	Shandong Luneng		

Managerial career
- 1999–2003: Shandong Luneng Youth
- 2003–2004: China Women
- 2005–2007: Shandong Luneng (assistant)
- 2013–2014: China U-17
- 2016–2022: Shandong Taishan (assistant)
- 2022–2024: Shandong Taishan U-21
- 2025–: Shandong Taishan B
- * Club domestic league appearances and goals

Zhang Haitao (simplified Chinese: 张海涛; traditional Chinese: 張海濤; pinyin: Zhāng Hǎitāo; born April 11, 1970) is a Chinese football coach and former player. He spent his whole career with the Shandong Team before he retired and moved into youth management with the Shandong Luneng youth team. He then moved into senior management with the Chinese women's football team before returning to Shandong, where he is the assistant manager.

== Playing career ==
Born into a respectable family, Haitao went to university while still playing for the Shandong youth team. In 1989, he graduated to the senior team and played as defender in his first season; however, he saw his team get relegated when Shandong finished 7th in the league. After several rough seasons where Shandong spent much of their time in the lower leagues Zhang gained significant playing time which aided him when Shandong became a professional football team in 1994 and were allowed entry to the top tier. With another chance to play in the top tier Zhang helped Shandong to finish the season in 5th at the end of the 1994 league season despite missing much of it through severe injury to his right knee. Despite missing much of the following season he helped Shandong finish 6th and achieved his greatest playing moment when he helped Shandong win the 1995 Chinese FA Cup. Zhang retired from football at the end of the 1998 league season after being unable to fully recover from his knee damage and was given the chance to manage the Shandong Luneng Youth team in December 1998.

== Management career ==
=== China women's national soccer team ===
After spending several years training as a manager with the Shandong Luneng youth team where he was considered a talented young coach able to speak fluent English, he was offered the chance to be head coach of the China women's national team in 2003 ready for 2004 Olympics at Athens. His time as the head coach however was not successful as China were unable to get out of the group stages after a defeat to Germany, which saw them lose 8-0. This effectively saw Zhang Haitao leave his position as the head coach once the tournament finished.
