= Lü Hongchen =

Chinese footballer

Lü Hongchen 吕宏琛
Personal information
- Date of birth: May 16, 1989 (age 37)
- Place of birth: Tianjin, China
- Height: 1.86 m (6 ft 1 in)
- Position: Defender

Team information
- Current team: Xiamen Feilu (head coach)

Senior career*
Years	Team	Apps	(Gls)
2007–2008	Xinjiang Sport Lottery		
2009–2010	Tianjin Locomotive		
2011–2020	Shijiazhuang Ever Bright	33	(0)

Managerial career
- 2026–: Xiamen Feilu
- * Club domestic league appearances and goals as of 31 December 2020

Lü Hongchen (Chinese: 吕宏琛; born 16 May 1989 in Tianjin) is a Chinese former professional football player who played as defender. He represented Xinjiang Sport Lottery Tianjin Locomotive and Shijiazhuang Ever Bright where he played the majority of his career, gaining two promotions with them and playing several seasons in the top tier of the Chinese Super League.

== Club career ==
In July 2007, Lü Hongchen started his professional footballer career with Xinjiang Sport Lottery in the China League Two. In 2011, Lü transferred to fellow China League Two side Fujian Smart Hero. He would gain promotion with them at the end of the 2011 China League Two campaign. The club would move to a different city and change their name to Shijiazhuang Ever Bright. He would be part of the squad that gained promotion to the top tier at the end of the 2014 China League One season. On 12 August 2015, Lü played his first top tier game for Shijiazhuang in the 2015 Chinese Super League against Tianjin Teda in a 1-1 draw.

== Career statistics ==
Statistics accurate as of match played 31 December 2020.

Appearances and goals by club, season and competition
Club	Season	League			National Cup		Continental		Other		Total	
Club	Season	Division	Apps	Goals	Apps	Goals	Apps	Goals	Apps	Goals	Apps	Goals
Xinjiang Sport Lottery	2007	China League Two			-		-		-			
Xinjiang Sport Lottery	2008	China League Two			-		-		-			
Xinjiang Sport Lottery	Total				0	0	0	0	0	0		
Tianjin Locomotive	2009	China League Two			-		-		-			
Tianjin Locomotive	2010	China League Two			-		-		-			
Tianjin Locomotive	Total				0	0	0	0	0	0		
Shijiazhuang Ever Bright	2011	China League Two	23	0	-		-		-		23	0
Shijiazhuang Ever Bright	2012	China League One	0	0	0	0	-		-		0	0
Shijiazhuang Ever Bright	2013	China League One	0	0	0	0	-		-		0	0
Shijiazhuang Ever Bright	2014	China League One	5	0	1	0	-		-		6	0
Shijiazhuang Ever Bright	2015	Chinese Super League	4	0	1	0	-		-		5	0
Shijiazhuang Ever Bright	2016	Chinese Super League	1	0	2	0	-		-		3	0
Shijiazhuang Ever Bright	2017	China League One	0	0	0	0	-		-		0	0
Shijiazhuang Ever Bright	2018	China League One	0	0	0	0	-		-		0	0
Shijiazhuang Ever Bright	2019	China League One	0	0	0	0	-		-		0	0
Shijiazhuang Ever Bright	Total		33	0	4	0	0	0	0	0	37	0
Career total			33	0	4	0	0	0	0	0	37	0
