= Changchun Stadium =

Sports venue in Changchun, Jilin, China

Coordinates: 43°51′50.92″N 125°20′12.70″E

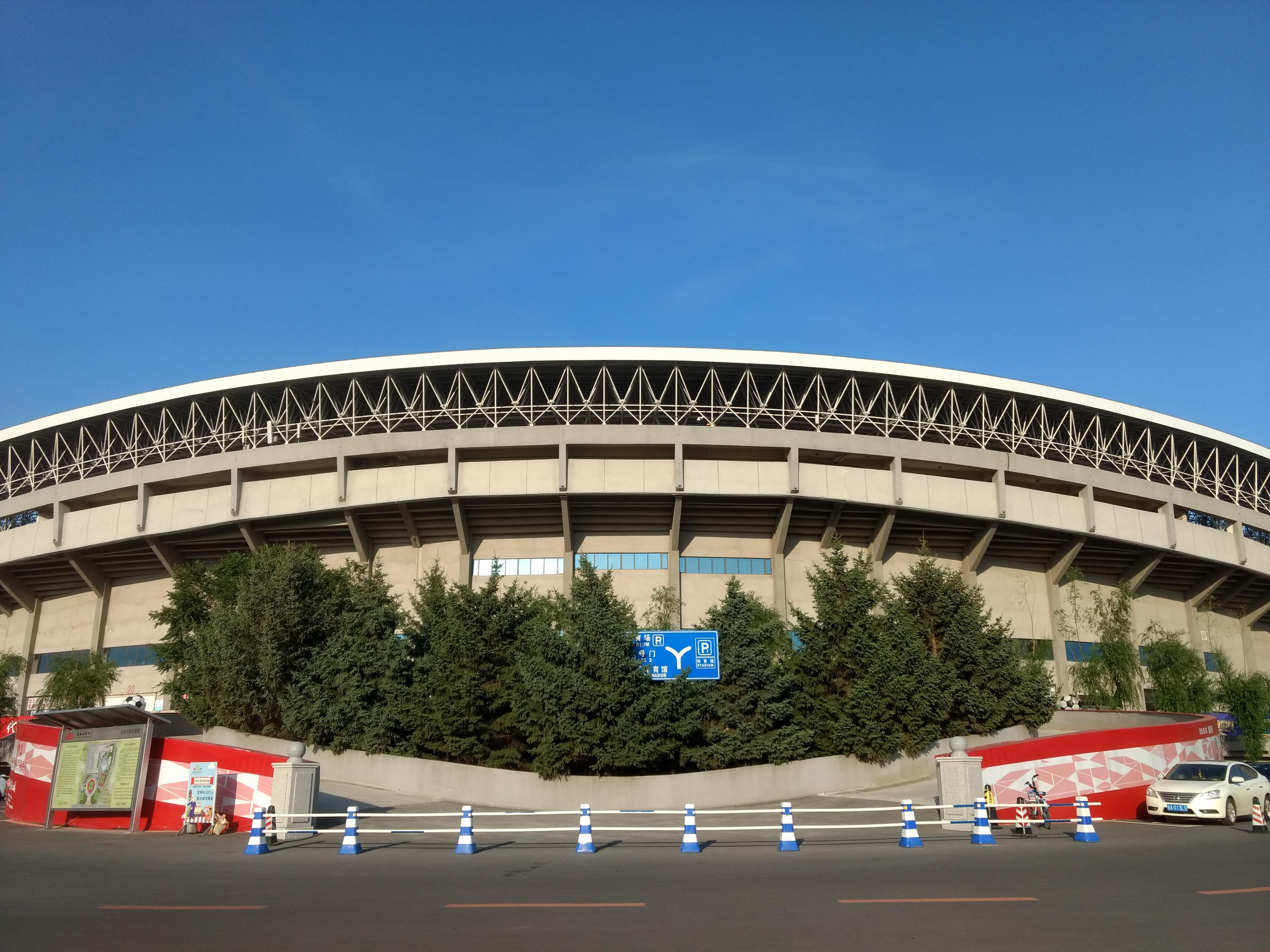
- Interactive map of Changchun Stadium
- Full name: 长春体育场
- Location: Changchun, China
- Capacity: 41,638

Construction
- Opened: 1992

Tenant
- Changchun Yatai 2000-2003, 2005-2008, 2018-Present

Changchun Stadium (Chinese: 长春体育场; lit. 'Chǎngchūn tǐyùchǎng'), also known as Nanling Stadium, is a multi-purpose stadium in Changchun, Jilin, China. It is predominantly used for football matches. Originally opened in 1992, the stadium has a maximum capacity of 41,638. It is currently the home of Changchun Yatai of the Chinese Super League, who returned to the stadium after previously playing there during the 2000s.

== See also ==
- Sports in China
