= Xiamen Feilu F.C. =

Association football club in China

Xiamen Feilu
- Full name: Xiamen Feilu Football Club 厦门飞鹭足球俱乐部
- Founded: 18 August 2011; 15 years ago
- Ground: Haicang District Sports Center Stadium; Xiamen Sports Center Stadium
- Capacity: 15,755; 32,000
- Chairman: Huang Shibo
- Manager: Lü Hongchen
Home colours	Away colours

Xiamen Feilu Football Club (simplified Chinese: 厦门飞鹭足球俱乐部; traditional Chinese: 廈門飛鷺足球俱樂部; pinyin: Xiàmén Fēilù Zúqiú Jùlèbù) is a Chinese professional football club based in Xiamen, Fujian, that competes in . Xiamen Feilu plays its home matches at the Haicang District Sports Center Stadium, located within Haicang District.

== History ==
The club was founded as Xiamen Lianchuang Century Football Club (simplified Chinese: 厦门联创世纪足球俱乐部; traditional Chinese: 廈門聯創世紀足球俱樂部; pinyin: Xiàmén Liánchuàngshìjì Zúqiú Jùlèbù) on 18 August 2011. It was founded by three local entrepreneurs from Xiamen, two of which were in the international trade industry, who pushed to foster a professional football club in the city as there were none. In their start to life, the team was made up of local school football coaches and physical education teachers. In 2019, the club changed its name to Xiamen 1026 Football Club (simplified Chinese: 厦门壹零贰陆足球俱乐部; traditional Chinese: 廈門壹零貳陸足球俱樂部; pinyin: Xiàmén Yīlíng'èrliù Zúqiú Jùlèbù), as one of the founders' birthday fell on 26 October.

Xiamen 1026 qualified for the Chinese Champions League for the first time in 2023, as the winners of the 2022 Xiamen FA Super League. In the club's first ever match in a national competition, Xiamen 1026 were defeated 4–0 to Guangzhou E-Power on 22 May. The club were eventually eliminated at the regional tournament, after losing to Chao Pak Kei and Guangdong Red Treasure. In 2024, Xiamen 1026 set a goal to fight for promotion. After finishing in first place in the Zhangzhou region of the regional tournament, they qualified for the final round for the first time. They qualified for a promotional play-offs spot, but were eliminated by Qianxinan Xufengtang via a penalty shoot-out.

In the 2025 Chinese Champions League, Xiamen 1026 progressed to the final round once more through the regional tournament, and were allocated into the south group of the final round. After a 2–0 win over old rivals Qianxinan Xufengtang on 12 October and remaining undefeated in seven matches, they topped their group and secured promotion to China League Two. In the year 2025, the first team trained in Fuzhou, Fujian, instead of their home city of Xiamen, and has had to take a three-hour bus ride and an overnight stay in Xiamen for their home matches. On 26 October, after beating Shanghai Second 5–2 on aggregate in the final, Xiamen 1026 were crowned 2025 Chinese Champions League champions.

== Colours ==
The club wears orange as its main colour, as the founders thought that it symbolised prosperity and pride.

== Players ==
=== First-team squad ===
As of 9 May 2025

Note: Flags indicate national team as defined under FIFA eligibility rules; some limited exceptions apply. Players may hold more than one non-FIFA nationality.

No.	Pos.	Nation	Player
4	DF	CHN	Xu Anbang
7	DF	CHN	Sun Xiaolu
8	MF	CHN	Li Qifeng
10	MF	CHN	Feng Shuaihang
11	MF	CHN	Fan Xiaobin
15	MF	CHN	Hu Ruiqian
16	DF	CHN	Yang Pengju
17	FW	CHN	Tohtaji Ablikim
19	FW	CHN	Li Borui
20	MF	CHN	Song Haiwang
23	MF	CHN	Chen Linqi
24	DF	CHN	Sun Longxiang

No.	Pos.	Nation	Player
25	MF	CHN	Zhang Yue
26	MF	CHN	Sun Jungang
29	MF	CHN	Shi Xiaoyue
33	FW	CHN	Yang Chen
41	FW	CHN	Tong Feige
47	GK	CHN	Bao Junchen
60	MF	CHN	Wang Pengyu
66	DF	CHN	Piao Entian
69	MF	CHN	Li Junwei
77	FW	CHN	Li Zongru
82	DF	CHN	Zhuo Zhenkai
99	GK	CHN	Hu Binghan

== Non-playing staff ==
Position	Staff
Head coach	(China) Chen Linqi
Team leader	(China) Chen Haifeng
Assistant coaches	(China) Song Haiwang (China) Sun Xiaolu (China) Sun Yixuan
Team doctor	(China) Ye Weinian
Officials	(China) Hong Zhenteng (China) Huang Shibo (China) Lian Jinjun (China) Wang Xiaobin (China) Xu Wei (China) Ye Guoxing

=== Managerial history ===
Tenure	Manager
2023	(China) Shi Weiping
2024	(China) Huang Shibo
2025	(China) Chen Linqi
2026–present	(China) Lü Hongchen

== Honours ==
League

- Chinese Champions League
  - Champions: 2025
