= 2025 Chinese Champions League =

Chinese Champions League
- Season: 2025
- Dates: 2 April – 2025
- Champions: Xiamen 1026
- Promoted: Xiamen 1026; Shanghai Second; Dalian Kewei

The 2025 Chinese Champions League, officially known as the 2025 Chinese Football Association Member Association Champions League (Chinese: 2025中国足球协会会员协会冠军联赛), is the 24th season of the fourth-tier competition in Chinese football since its establishment in 2002, as well as the 8th season under its current Chinese Champions League (CMCL) title since its rebrand in 2018.

The season began on 2 April 2025.

== Qualified teams ==
71 teams, including Macau U-23, entered the regional tournament.

== Regional tournament ==
The following nine cities will host regional competitions: Baotou, Dingnan, Qujing, Rizhao, Sanshui, Wuchuan, Xingyi, Yinchuan, and Yulin. The draw for the regional competitions was held on 17 March 2025. 71 teams were drawn into 18 groups.

=== Qujing ===
==== Group A ====
Pos	Team	Pld	W	D	L	GF	GA	GD	Pts	Qualification
1	Yunnan Cuanhe	3	3	0	0	6	1	+5	9	Qualification for Qualifying round
2	Chengdu Top Shine Jincheng	3	2	0	1	11	1	+10	6	Qualification for Qualifying round
3	Guizhou Open University	3	1	0	2	2	8	−6	3	Qualification for Third-placed playoffs
4	Nanning Dongfang Juding	3	0	0	3	1	10	−9	0	Qualification for Fourth-placed playoffs

Rules for classification: 1) Points; 2) Head-to-head points; 3) Head-to-head goal difference; 4) Head-to-head goals scored; 5) If the tiebreaker concerns a qualification place, a penalty shoot-out may be arranged; 6) Goal difference; 7) Goals scored; 8) Disciplinary points (yellow card = 1 point, red card as a result of two yellow cards = 3 points, direct red card = 3 points, yellow card followed by direct red card = 4 points); 9) Drawing of lots.

==== Group B ====
Pos	Team	Pld	W	D	L	GF	GA	GD	Pts	Qualification
1	Guangxi Union	3	2	1	0	12	3	+9	7	Qualification for Qualifying round
2	Chongqing Chunlei	3	2	1	0	11	2	+9	7	Qualification for Qualifying round
3	Xiamen Lujian Tiancheng	3	1	0	2	4	10	−6	3	Qualification for Third-placed playoffs
4	Qiandongnan Miaoling	3	0	0	3	2	14	−12	0	Qualification for Fourth-placed playoffs

Rules for classification: 1) Points; 2) Head-to-head points; 3) Head-to-head goal difference; 4) Head-to-head goals scored; 5) If the tiebreaker concerns a qualification place, a penalty shoot-out may be arranged; 6) Goal difference; 7) Goals scored; 8) Disciplinary points (yellow card = 1 point, red card as a result of two yellow cards = 3 points, direct red card = 3 points, yellow card followed by direct red card = 4 points); 9) Drawing of lots.

=== Xingyi ===
==== Group C ====
Pos	Team	Pld	W	D	L	GF	GA	GD	Pts	Qualification
1	Sichuan Youth Athletic	3	3	0	0	8	1	+7	9	Qualification for Qualifying round
2	Qianxinan Xufengtang	3	2	0	1	9	1	+8	6	Qualification for Qualifying round
3	Guangzhou Rockgoal	3	1	0	2	10	12	−2	3	Qualification for Third-placed playoffs
4	Chongqing Gaoxin Tiger	3	0	0	3	1	14	−13	0	Qualification for Fourth-placed playoffs

Rules for classification: 1) Points; 2) Head-to-head points; 3) Head-to-head goal difference; 4) Head-to-head goals scored; 5) If the tiebreaker concerns a qualification place, a penalty shoot-out may be arranged; 6) Goal difference; 7) Goals scored; 8) Disciplinary points (yellow card = 1 point, red card as a result of two yellow cards = 3 points, direct red card = 3 points, yellow card followed by direct red card = 4 points); 9) Drawing of lots.

==== Group D ====
Pos	Team	Pld	W	D	L	GF	GA	GD	Pts	Qualification
1	Shenzhen Jixiang	3	3	0	0	8	1	+7	9	Qualification for Qualifying round
2	Chongqing Handa	3	2	0	1	5	2	+3	6	Qualification for Qualifying round
3	Guizhou Feiying	3	0	1	2	2	6	−4	1	Qualification for Third-placed playoffs
4	Liangshan Jiunuo	3	0	1	2	2	8	−6	1	Qualification for Fourth-placed playoffs

Rules for classification: 1) Points; 2) Head-to-head points; 3) Head-to-head goal difference; 4) Head-to-head goals scored; 5) If the tiebreaker concerns a qualification place, a penalty shoot-out may be arranged; 6) Goal difference; 7) Goals scored; 8) Disciplinary points (yellow card = 1 point, red card as a result of two yellow cards = 3 points, direct red card = 3 points, yellow card followed by direct red card = 4 points); 9) Drawing of lots.

=== Wuchuan ===
==== Group E ====
Pos	Team	Pld	W	D	L	GF	GA	GD	Pts	Qualification
1	Nanjing Tehu	3	2	1	0	14	2	+12	7	Qualification for Qualifying round
2	Wuchuan Youth	3	2	1	0	13	1	+12	7	Qualification for Qualifying round
3	Hubei Super Mr.	3	1	0	2	12	3	+9	3	Qualification for Third-placed playoffs
4	Hainan Shuangyu	3	0	0	3	0	33	−33	0	Qualification for Fourth-placed playoffs

Rules for classification: 1) Points; 2) Head-to-head points; 3) Head-to-head goal difference; 4) Head-to-head goals scored; 5) If the tiebreaker concerns a qualification place, a penalty shoot-out may be arranged; 6) Goal difference; 7) Goals scored; 8) Disciplinary points (yellow card = 1 point, red card as a result of two yellow cards = 3 points, direct red card = 3 points, yellow card followed by direct red card = 4 points); 9) Drawing of lots.

==== Group F ====
Pos	Team	Pld	W	D	L	GF	GA	GD	Pts	Qualification
1	Wuhua Huajing	3	3	0	0	11	3	+8	9	Qualification for Qualifying round
2	Wuhan Golden Banks of Two Rivers	3	2	0	1	5	2	+3	6	Qualification for Qualifying round
3	Guangxi Bushan	3	1	0	2	6	5	+1	3	Qualification for Third-placed playoffs
4	Nanjing Dragon Victory	3	0	0	3	3	15	−12	0	Qualification for Fourth-placed playoffs

Rules for classification: 1) Points; 2) Head-to-head points; 3) Head-to-head goal difference; 4) Head-to-head goals scored; 5) If the tiebreaker concerns a qualification place, a penalty shoot-out may be arranged; 6) Goal difference; 7) Goals scored; 8) Disciplinary points (yellow card = 1 point, red card as a result of two yellow cards = 3 points, direct red card = 3 points, yellow card followed by direct red card = 4 points); 9) Drawing of lots.

=== Sanshui ===
==== Group G ====
Pos	Team	Pld	W	D	L	GF	GA	GD	Pts	Qualification
1	Canton United	3	2	1	0	8	4	+4	7	Qualification for Qualifying round
2	Shanghai Imair	3	1	2	0	5	4	+1	5	Qualification for Qualifying round
3	Xiamen Chengyi	3	1	1	1	6	6	0	4	Qualification for Third-placed playoffs
4	Macau U-23	3	0	0	3	1	6	−5	0	

Rules for classification: 1) Points; 2) Head-to-head points; 3) Head-to-head goal difference; 4) Head-to-head goals scored; 5) If the tiebreaker concerns a qualification place, a penalty shoot-out may be arranged; 6) Goal difference; 7) Goals scored; 8) Disciplinary points (yellow card = 1 point, red card as a result of two yellow cards = 3 points, direct red card = 3 points, yellow card followed by direct red card = 4 points); 9) Drawing of lots.

==== Group H ====
Pos	Team	Pld	W	D	L	GF	GA	GD	Pts	Qualification
1	Xiamen 1026	2	1	1	0	6	2	+4	4	Qualification for Qualifying round
2	Guangdong Red Treasure	2	1	1	0	4	1	+3	4	Qualification for Qualifying round
3	Nantong New Dreams	2	0	0	2	1	8	−7	0	Qualification for Third-placed playoffs

Rules for classification: 1) Points; 2) Head-to-head points; 3) Head-to-head goal difference; 4) Head-to-head goals scored; 5) If the tiebreaker concerns a qualification place, a penalty shoot-out may be arranged; 6) Goal difference; 7) Goals scored; 8) Disciplinary points (yellow card = 1 point, red card as a result of two yellow cards = 3 points, direct red card = 3 points, yellow card followed by direct red card = 4 points); 9) Drawing of lots.

=== Dingnan ===
==== Group I ====
Pos	Team	Pld	W	D	L	GF	GA	GD	Pts	Qualification
1	Wuhan Lianzhen	3	2	1	0	5	1	+4	7	Qualification for Qualifying round
2	Huzhou Meiqi	3	1	2	0	2	1	+1	5	Qualification for Qualifying round
3	Shanghai Tongji	3	1	1	1	2	2	0	4	Qualification for Third-placed playoffs
4	Changle Jingangtui	3	0	0	3	1	6	−5	0	Qualification for Fourth-placed playoffs

Rules for classification: 1) Points; 2) Head-to-head points; 3) Head-to-head goal difference; 4) Head-to-head goals scored; 5) If the tiebreaker concerns a qualification place, a penalty shoot-out may be arranged; 6) Goal difference; 7) Goals scored; 8) Disciplinary points (yellow card = 1 point, red card as a result of two yellow cards = 3 points, direct red card = 3 points, yellow card followed by direct red card = 4 points); 9) Drawing of lots.

==== Group J ====
Pos	Team	Pld	W	D	L	GF	GA	GD	Pts	Qualification
1	Shanghai Second	3	3	0	0	5	0	+5	9	Qualification for Qualifying round
2	Yantai Xinhai Zhongtian	3	2	0	1	4	5	−1	6	Qualification for Qualifying round
3	Quanzhou Qinggong	3	1	0	2	3	4	−1	3	Qualification for Third-placed playoffs
4	Wuhan Juxing Shanyao	3	0	0	3	2	5	−3	0	Qualification for Fourth-placed playoffs

Rules for classification: 1) Points; 2) Head-to-head points; 3) Head-to-head goal difference; 4) Head-to-head goals scored; 5) If the tiebreaker concerns a qualification place, a penalty shoot-out may be arranged; 6) Goal difference; 7) Goals scored; 8) Disciplinary points (yellow card = 1 point, red card as a result of two yellow cards = 3 points, direct red card = 3 points, yellow card followed by direct red card = 4 points); 9) Drawing of lots.

=== Yinchuan ===
==== Group K ====
Pos	Team	Pld	W	D	L	GF	GA	GD	Pts	Qualification
1	Heze Caozhou	3	1	2	0	4	2	+2	5	Qualification for Qualifying round
2	Ordos Dongsheng Manson	3	1	2	0	3	2	+1	5	Qualification for Qualifying round
3	Xinjiang Silk Road Eagle	3	0	3	0	2	2	0	3	Qualification for Third-placed playoffs
4	Ningxia Pingluo Hengli	3	0	1	2	2	5	−3	1	Qualification for Fourth-placed playoffs

Rules for classification: 1) Points; 2) Head-to-head points; 3) Head-to-head goal difference; 4) Head-to-head goals scored; 5) If the tiebreaker concerns a qualification place, a penalty shoot-out may be arranged; 6) Goal difference; 7) Goals scored; 8) Disciplinary points (yellow card = 1 point, red card as a result of two yellow cards = 3 points, direct red card = 3 points, yellow card followed by direct red card = 4 points); 9) Drawing of lots.

==== Group L ====
Pos	Team	Pld	W	D	L	GF	GA	GD	Pts	Qualification
1	Qinghai Xining Kunlun	3	3	0	0	11	0	+11	9	Qualification for Qualifying round
2	Xinjiang Jindun	3	2	0	1	6	2	+4	6	Qualification for Qualifying round
3	Shaanxi Shanan	3	1	0	2	6	10	−4	3	Qualification for Third-placed playoffs
4	Hohhot Xingchen Green	3	0	0	3	3	14	−11	0	Qualification for Fourth-placed playoffs

Rules for classification: 1) Points; 2) Head-to-head points; 3) Head-to-head goal difference; 4) Head-to-head goals scored; 5) If the tiebreaker concerns a qualification place, a penalty shoot-out may be arranged; 6) Goal difference; 7) Goals scored; 8) Disciplinary points (yellow card = 1 point, red card as a result of two yellow cards = 3 points, direct red card = 3 points, yellow card followed by direct red card = 4 points); 9) Drawing of lots.

=== Yulin ===
==== Group M ====
Pos	Team	Pld	W	D	L	GF	GA	GD	Pts	Qualification
1	Dalian Hanyu	3	2	1	0	7	1	+6	7	Qualification for Qualifying round
2	Yulin Mobei Miners	3	2	0	1	5	4	+1	6	Qualification for Qualifying round
3	Ili Tianshan Flyworld	3	0	2	1	2	3	−1	2	Qualification for Third-placed playoffs
4	Baoding Xuecheng Athletic	3	0	1	2	1	7	−6	1	Qualification for Fourth-placed playoffs

Rules for classification: 1) Points; 2) Head-to-head points; 3) Head-to-head goal difference; 4) Head-to-head goals scored; 5) If the tiebreaker concerns a qualification place, a penalty shoot-out may be arranged; 6) Goal difference; 7) Goals scored; 8) Disciplinary points (yellow card = 1 point, red card as a result of two yellow cards = 3 points, direct red card = 3 points, yellow card followed by direct red card = 4 points); 9) Drawing of lots.

==== Group N ====
Pos	Team	Pld	W	D	L	GF	GA	GD	Pts	Qualification
1	Shaanxi Northwest Youth	3	3	0	0	12	1	+11	9	Qualification for Qualifying round
2	Shijiazhuang Shangcheng	3	2	0	1	8	5	+3	6	Qualification for Qualifying round
3	Lanzhou Hailu	3	1	0	2	6	11	−5	3	Qualification for Third-placed playoffs
4	Tianjin Kaiser	3	0	0	3	4	13	−9	0	Qualification for Fourth-placed playoffs

Rules for classification: 1) Points; 2) Head-to-head points; 3) Head-to-head goal difference; 4) Head-to-head goals scored; 5) If the tiebreaker concerns a qualification place, a penalty shoot-out may be arranged; 6) Goal difference; 7) Goals scored; 8) Disciplinary points (yellow card = 1 point, red card as a result of two yellow cards = 3 points, direct red card = 3 points, yellow card followed by direct red card = 4 points); 9) Drawing of lots.

=== Baotou ===
==== Group O ====
Pos	Team	Pld	W	D	L	GF	GA	GD	Pts	Qualification
1	Beijing Pengrui	3	2	1	0	9	0	+9	7	Qualification for Qualifying round
2	Jinan Quansheng United	3	2	1	0	6	0	+6	7	Qualification for Qualifying round
3	Inner Mongolia Caoshangfei	3	1	0	2	3	6	−3	3	Qualification for Third-placed playoffs
4	Shanxi Xiangyu	3	0	0	3	2	14	−12	0	Qualification for Fourth-placed playoffs

Rules for classification: 1) Points; 2) Head-to-head points; 3) Head-to-head goal difference; 4) Head-to-head goals scored; 5) If the tiebreaker concerns a qualification place, a penalty shoot-out may be arranged; 6) Goal difference; 7) Goals scored; 8) Disciplinary points (yellow card = 1 point, red card as a result of two yellow cards = 3 points, direct red card = 3 points, yellow card followed by direct red card = 4 points); 9) Drawing of lots.

==== Group P ====
Pos	Team	Pld	W	D	L	GF	GA	GD	Pts	Qualification
1	Beijing Smart Sky	3	1	2	0	3	2	+1	5	Qualification for Qualifying round
2	Shanxi TYUT Yida	3	1	1	1	3	2	+1	4	Qualification for Qualifying round
3	Linyi Hongjian	3	1	1	1	6	6	0	4	Qualification for Third-placed playoffs
4	Boarder Yellow Banner Youth	3	0	2	1	3	5	−2	2	Qualification for Fourth-placed playoffs

Rules for classification: 1) Points; 2) Head-to-head points; 3) Head-to-head goal difference; 4) Head-to-head goals scored; 5) If the tiebreaker concerns a qualification place, a penalty shoot-out may be arranged; 6) Goal difference; 7) Goals scored; 8) Disciplinary points (yellow card = 1 point, red card as a result of two yellow cards = 3 points, direct red card = 3 points, yellow card followed by direct red card = 4 points); 9) Drawing of lots.

=== Rizhao ===
==== Group Q ====
Pos	Team	Pld	W	D	L	GF	GA	GD	Pts	Qualification
1	Dalian Kewei	3	3	0	0	9	1	+8	9	Qualification for Qualifying round
2	Shandong Scout	3	1	1	1	4	4	0	4	Qualification for Qualifying round
3	Yanbian Sports School	3	0	2	1	3	6	−3	2	Qualification for Third-placed playoffs
4	Qingdao May Wind	3	0	1	2	3	8	−5	1	Qualification for Fourth-placed playoffs

Rules for classification: 1) Points; 2) Head-to-head points; 3) Head-to-head goal difference; 4) Head-to-head goals scored; 5) If the tiebreaker concerns a qualification place, a penalty shoot-out may be arranged; 6) Goal difference; 7) Goals scored; 8) Disciplinary points (yellow card = 1 point, red card as a result of two yellow cards = 3 points, direct red card = 3 points, yellow card followed by direct red card = 4 points); 9) Drawing of lots.

==== Group R ====
Pos	Team	Pld	W	D	L	GF	GA	GD	Pts	Qualification
1	Jinan Tiansheng	3	2	1	0	5	2	+3	7	Qualification for Qualifying round
2	Heilongjiang Ice City	3	1	1	1	2	3	−1	4	Qualification for Qualifying round
3	Dalian Haiqing Changlong	3	1	0	2	2	3	−1	3	Qualification for Third-placed playoffs
4	Qingdao Quick Boy	3	0	2	1	2	3	−1	2	Qualification for Fourth-placed playoffs

Rules for classification: 1) Points; 2) Head-to-head points; 3) Head-to-head goal difference; 4) Head-to-head goals scored; 5) If the tiebreaker concerns a qualification place, a penalty shoot-out may be arranged; 6) Goal difference; 7) Goals scored; 8) Disciplinary points (yellow card = 1 point, red card as a result of two yellow cards = 3 points, direct red card = 3 points, yellow card followed by direct red card = 4 points); 9) Drawing of lots.

=== Qualifying round ===
==== Qujing ====
Pos	Team	Pld	W	D	L	GF	GA	GD	Pts	Qualification
1	Chongqing Chunlei	3	1	1	1	4	4	0	4	Qualification for Final round
2	Yunnan Cuanhe	3	1	1	1	3	3	0	4	Possible Final round
3	Chengdu Top Shine Jincheng	3	1	1	1	3	3	0	4	
4	Guangxi Union	3	0	3	0	3	3	0	3	

Rules for classification: 1) Points; 2) Head-to-head points; 3) Head-to-head goal difference; 4) Head-to-head goals scored; 5) If the tiebreaker concerns a qualification place, a penalty shoot-out may be arranged; 6) Goal difference; 7) Goals scored; 8) Disciplinary points (yellow card = 1 point, red card as a result of two yellow cards = 3 points, direct red card = 3 points, yellow card followed by direct red card = 4 points); 9) Drawing of lots.

==== Xingyi ====
Pos	Team	Pld	W	D	L	GF	GA	GD	Pts	Qualification
1	Qianxinan Xufengtang	3	1	1	1	1	1	0	4	Qualification for Final round
2	Shenzhen Jixiang	3	1	0	2	3	4	−1	3	Possible Final round
3	Chongqing Handa	2	0	1	1	1	2	−1	1	
4	Sichuan Youth Athletic	0	0	0	0	0	0	0	0	

Rules for classification: 1) Points; 2) Head-to-head points; 3) Head-to-head goal difference; 4) Head-to-head goals scored; 5) If the tiebreaker concerns a qualification place, a penalty shoot-out may be arranged; 6) Goal difference; 7) Goals scored; 8) Disciplinary points (yellow card = 1 point, red card as a result of two yellow cards = 3 points, direct red card = 3 points, yellow card followed by direct red card = 4 points); 9) Drawing of lots.

==== Wuchuan ====
Pos	Team	Pld	W	D	L	GF	GA	GD	Pts	Qualification
1	Wuhua Huajing	3	2	0	1	3	4	−1	6	Qualification for Final round
2	Nanjing Tehu	3	1	2	0	5	2	+3	5	Possible Final round
3	Wuchuan Youth	3	1	1	1	5	3	+2	4	
4	Wuhan Golden Banks of Two Rivers	3	0	1	2	3	7	−4	1	

Rules for classification: 1) Points; 2) Head-to-head points; 3) Head-to-head goal difference; 4) Head-to-head goals scored; 5) If the tiebreaker concerns a qualification place, a penalty shoot-out may be arranged; 6) Goal difference; 7) Goals scored; 8) Disciplinary points (yellow card = 1 point, red card as a result of two yellow cards = 3 points, direct red card = 3 points, yellow card followed by direct red card = 4 points); 9) Drawing of lots.

==== Sanshui ====
Pos	Team	Pld	W	D	L	GF	GA	GD	Pts	Qualification
1	Xiamen 1026	3	2	1	0	3	1	+2	7	Qualification for Final round
2	Shanghai Imair	3	1	1	1	5	3	+2	4	Possible Final round
3	Canton United	3	1	1	1	4	4	0	4	
4	Guangdong Red Treasure	3	0	1	2	2	6	−4	1	

Rules for classification: 1) Points; 2) Head-to-head points; 3) Head-to-head goal difference; 4) Head-to-head goals scored; 5) If the tiebreaker concerns a qualification place, a penalty shoot-out may be arranged; 6) Goal difference; 7) Goals scored; 8) Disciplinary points (yellow card = 1 point, red card as a result of two yellow cards = 3 points, direct red card = 3 points, yellow card followed by direct red card = 4 points); 9) Drawing of lots.

==== Dingnan ====
Pos	Team	Pld	W	D	L	GF	GA	GD	Pts	Qualification
1	Shanghai Second	3	3	0	0	6	0	+6	9	Qualification for Final round
2	Huzhou Meiqi	3	1	1	1	5	1	+4	4	Possible Final round
3	Wuhan Lianzhen	3	1	1	1	2	3	−1	4	
4	Yantai Xinhai Zhongtian	3	0	0	3	1	10	−9	0	

Rules for classification: 1) Points; 2) Head-to-head points; 3) Head-to-head goal difference; 4) Head-to-head goals scored; 5) If the tiebreaker concerns a qualification place, a penalty shoot-out may be arranged; 6) Goal difference; 7) Goals scored; 8) Disciplinary points (yellow card = 1 point, red card as a result of two yellow cards = 3 points, direct red card = 3 points, yellow card followed by direct red card = 4 points); 9) Drawing of lots.

==== Yinchuan ====
Pos	Team	Pld	W	D	L	GF	GA	GD	Pts	Qualification
1	Qinghai Xining Kunlun	3	3	0	0	4	1	+3	9	Qualification for Final round
2	Heze Caozhou	3	1	1	1	4	4	0	4	Possible Final round
3	Ordos Dongsheng Manson	3	0	2	1	1	2	−1	2	
4	Xinjiang Jindun	3	0	1	2	1	3	−2	1	

Rules for classification: 1) Points; 2) Head-to-head points; 3) Head-to-head goal difference; 4) Head-to-head goals scored; 5) If the tiebreaker concerns a qualification place, a penalty shoot-out may be arranged; 6) Goal difference; 7) Goals scored; 8) Disciplinary points (yellow card = 1 point, red card as a result of two yellow cards = 3 points, direct red card = 3 points, yellow card followed by direct red card = 4 points); 9) Drawing of lots.

==== Yulin ====
Pos	Team	Pld	W	D	L	GF	GA	GD	Pts	Qualification
1	Dalian Hanyu	3	1	2	0	3	1	+2	5	Qualification for Final round
2	Yulin Mobei Miners	3	1	1	1	1	2	−1	4	Possible Final round
3	Shaanxi Northwest Youth	3	1	1	1	3	2	+1	4	
4	Shijiazhuang Shangcheng	3	0	2	1	0	2	−2	2	

Rules for classification: 1) Points; 2) Head-to-head points; 3) Head-to-head goal difference; 4) Head-to-head goals scored; 5) If the tiebreaker concerns a qualification place, a penalty shoot-out may be arranged; 6) Goal difference; 7) Goals scored; 8) Disciplinary points (yellow card = 1 point, red card as a result of two yellow cards = 3 points, direct red card = 3 points, yellow card followed by direct red card = 4 points); 9) Drawing of lots.

==== Baotou ====
Pos	Team	Pld	W	D	L	GF	GA	GD	Pts	Qualification
1	Beijing Pengrui	3	2	1	0	7	3	+4	7	Qualification for Final round
2	Beijing Smart Sky	3	1	1	1	4	6	−2	4	Possible Final round
3	Shanxi TYUT Yida	3	1	0	2	4	5	−1	3	
4	Jinan Quansheng United	3	0	2	1	1	2	−1	2	

Rules for classification: 1) Points; 2) Head-to-head points; 3) Head-to-head goal difference; 4) Head-to-head goals scored; 5) If the tiebreaker concerns a qualification place, a penalty shoot-out may be arranged; 6) Goal difference; 7) Goals scored; 8) Disciplinary points (yellow card = 1 point, red card as a result of two yellow cards = 3 points, direct red card = 3 points, yellow card followed by direct red card = 4 points); 9) Drawing of lots.

==== Rizhao ====
Pos	Team	Pld	W	D	L	GF	GA	GD	Pts	Qualification
1	Dalian Kewei	3	3	0	0	7	3	+4	9	Qualification for Final round
2	Jinan Tiansheng	3	1	1	1	4	3	+1	4	Possible Final round
3	Shandong Scout	3	1	1	1	3	3	0	4	
4	Heilongjiang Ice City	3	0	0	3	1	6	−5	0	

Rules for classification: 1) Points; 2) Head-to-head points; 3) Head-to-head goal difference; 4) Head-to-head goals scored; 5) If the tiebreaker concerns a qualification place, a penalty shoot-out may be arranged; 6) Goal difference; 7) Goals scored; 8) Disciplinary points (yellow card = 1 point, red card as a result of two yellow cards = 3 points, direct red card = 3 points, yellow card followed by direct red card = 4 points); 9) Drawing of lots.

==== Ranking of second-placed teams ====
Pos	Team	Pld	W	D	L	GF	GA	GD	Pts	Qualification
1	Nanjing Tehu	5	3	2	0	18	3	+15	11	Qualification for Final round
2	Yunnan Cuanhe	5	3	1	1	8	4	+4	10	Qualification for Final round
3	Yulin Mobei Miners	5	3	1	1	6	4	+2	10	Qualification for Final round
4	Shenzhen Jixiang	5	3	0	2	9	4	+5	9	Qualification for Final round
5	Huzhou Meiqi	5	2	2	1	7	2	+5	8	Qualification for Final round
6	Shanghai Imair	5	2	2	1	8	5	+3	8	Qualification for Playoffs
7	Jinan Tiansheng	5	2	2	1	7	5	+2	8	Qualification for Playoffs
8	Heze Caozhou	5	2	2	1	7	5	+2	8	Qualification for Playoffs
9	Beijing Smart Sky	5	1	3	1	5	7	−2	6	Qualification for Playoffs

Rules for classification: 1) Points; 2) Head-to-head points; 3) Head-to-head goal difference; 4) Head-to-head goals scored; 5) If the tiebreaker concerns a qualification place, a penalty shoot-out may be arranged; 6) Goal difference; 7) Goals scored; 8) Disciplinary points (yellow card = 1 point, red card as a result of two yellow cards = 3 points, direct red card = 3 points, yellow card followed by direct red card = 4 points); 9) Drawing of lots.

=== Playoffs ===
29 June 2025
17:00 UTC+8

Beijing Smart Sky	2–2	Shanghai Imair

5 July 2025
16:00 UTC+8

Shanghai Imair	2–0	Beijing Smart Sky

Shanghai Imair won 4–2 on aggregate.

2 July 2025
16:00 UTC+8

Jinan Tiansheng	3–0	Heze Caozhou

6 July 2025
17:00 UTC+8

Heze Caozhou	1–1	Jinan Tiansheng

Jinan Tiansheng won 4–1 on aggregate.

== Final round ==
Huzhou Meiqi withdrew from the competition and Beijing Smart Sky took their place.

=== North Group ===
Pos	Team	Pld	W	D	L	GF	GA	GD	Pts	Promotion or qualification
1	Shanghai Second (P)	7	6	1	0	12	5	+7	19	Promotion to China League Two and qualification for Final
2	Nanjing Tehu	7	4	1	2	7	7	0	13	Qualification for Promotion play-offs
3	Dalian Kewei (P)	7	2	5	0	14	7	+7	11	Qualification for Promotion play-offs
4	Dalian Hanyu	7	3	2	2	9	8	+1	11	Qualification for Promotion play-offs
5	Qinghai Xining Kunlun	7	2	3	2	8	4	+4	9	Qualification for Promotion play-offs
6	Yulin Mobei Miners	7	2	2	3	8	10	−2	8	
7	Beijing Pengrui	7	1	1	5	8	14	−6	4	
8	Jinan Tiansheng	7	0	1	6	1	12	−11	1	

Rules for classification: 1) Points; 2) Head-to-head points; 3) Head-to-head goal difference; 4) Head-to-head goals scored; 5) If the tiebreaker concerns a qualification place, a penalty shoot-out may be arranged; 6) Goal difference; 7) Goals scored; 8) Disciplinary points (yellow card = 1 point, red card as a result of two yellow cards = 3 points, direct red card = 3 points, yellow card followed by direct red card = 4 points); 9) Drawing of lots.
(P) Promoted

=== South Group ===
Pos	Team	Pld	W	D	L	GF	GA	GD	Pts	Promotion or qualification
1	Xiamen 1026 (C, P)	7	5	2	0	12	3	+9	17	Promotion to China League Two and qualification for Final
2	Chongqing Chunlei	7	5	1	1	13	5	+8	16	Qualification for Promotion play-offs
3	Shanghai Imair	7	2	4	1	11	9	+2	10	Qualification for Promotion play-offs
4	Wuhua Huajing	7	2	3	2	10	12	−2	9	Qualification for Promotion play-offs
5	Shenzhen Jixiang	7	2	2	3	8	8	0	8	Qualification for Promotion play-offs
6	Beijing Smart Sky	7	1	3	3	6	9	−3	6	
7	Qianxinan Xufengtang	7	2	0	5	6	12	−6	6	
8	Yunnan Cuanhe	7	0	3	4	5	13	−8	3	

Rules for classification: 1) Points; 2) Head-to-head points; 3) Head-to-head goal difference; 4) Head-to-head goals scored; 5) If the tiebreaker concerns a qualification place, a penalty shoot-out may be arranged; 6) Goal difference; 7) Goals scored; 8) Disciplinary points (yellow card = 1 point, red card as a result of two yellow cards = 3 points, direct red card = 3 points, yellow card followed by direct red card = 4 points); 9) Drawing of lots.
(C) Champions; (P) Promoted

=== Promotion play-offs ===
==== Quarter-finals ====
18 October 2025
16:00 UTC+8

Wuhua Huajing	0–2	Dalian Kewei

Hengbei Football Town Field No.9, Meizhou
25 October 2025
15:00 UTC+8

Dalian Kewei	2–1	Wuhua Huajing

Puwan New District Stadium, Dalian

19 October 2025
15:00 UTC+8

Qinghai Xining Kunlun	2–2	Chongqing Chunlei

Qinghai Duoba National Plateau Training Base Stadium, Xining
25 October 2025
15:00 UTC+8

Chongqing Chunlei	1–1	Qinghai Xining Kunlun

Longxing Football Stadium Outer Field, Chongqing

19 October 2025
15:00 UTC+8

Shanghai Imair	2–1	Dalian Hanyu

Jinshan Sports Centre Outer Field No.5, Shanghai
25 October 2025
15:00 UTC+8

Dalian Hanyu	1–0	Shanghai Imair

Dalian Youth Football Training Base Field No.10, Dalian

17 October 2025
15:30 UTC+8

Shenzhen Jixiang	1–0	Nanjing Tehu

Shenzhen Youth Football Training Base Field No.1, Shenzhen
26 October 2025
15:00 UTC+8

Nanjing Tehu	1–0	Shenzhen Jixiang

Hohai University Stadium, Nanjing

==== Semi-finals ====
2 November 2025
15:30 UTC+8

Dalian Kewei	2–1	Chongqing Chunlei

Puwan New District Stadium, Dalian
8 November 2025
15:00 UTC+8

Chongqing Chunlei	0–1	Dalian Kewei

Longxing Football Stadium Outer Field, Chongqing

1 November 2025
15:00 UTC+8

Dalian Hanyu	0–0	Nanjing Tehu

Dalian Youth Football Training Base Field No.10, Dalian
9 November 2025
14:30 UTC+8

Nanjing Tehu	1–2	Dalian Hanyu

Hohai University Stadium, Nanjing

==== Finals ====
16 November 2025
15:00 UTC+8

Dalian Hanyu	1–2	Dalian Kewei

Dalian Youth Football Training Base Field No.10, Dalian
23 November 2025
15:00 UTC+8

Dalian Kewei	0–1	Dalian Hanyu

Puwan New District Stadium, Dalian

=== Final ===
18 October 2025
15:30 UTC+8

Shanghai Second	2–3	Xiamen 1026

Lingang Football Complex Sports Center, Shanghai
26 October 2025
19:00 UTC+8

Xiamen 1026	2–0	Shanghai Second

Xiamen Sports Center Stadium, Xiamen

== Promotion play-offs ==
12 December 2025
14:30 UTC+8

Dalian Hanyu	0–2	Dalian Yingbo U21

Mission Hills International Football Training Base Field No.7, Haikou
Referee: Xing Qi
