= Sun Jie (footballer) =

Chinese footballer

Sun Jie 孙捷
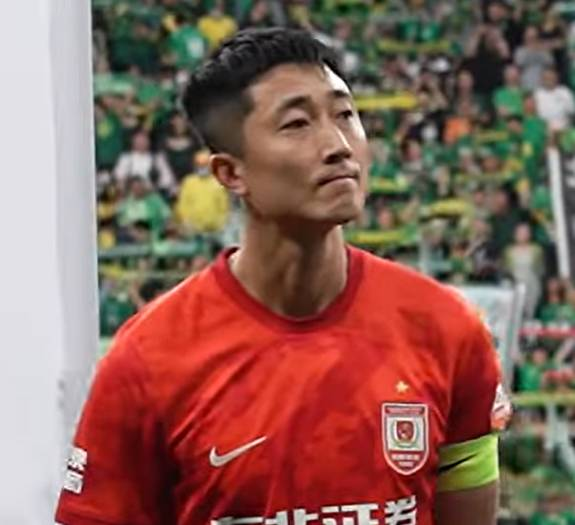
- Sun Jie in June 2023

Personal information
- Date of birth: 9 February 1991 (age 35)
- Place of birth: Dalian, Liaoning, China
- Height: 1.91 m (6 ft 3 in)
- Position: Defender

Team information
- Current team: Qingdao West Coast
- Number: 36

Youth career
- Changchun Yatai

Senior career*
Years	Team	Apps	(Gls)
2009–2024	Changchun Yatai	218	(8)
2019	→ Stabæk (loan)	0	(0)
2023–2024	→ Qingdao West Coast (loan)	22	(4)
2025–	Qingdao West Coast	18	(0)

International career
2009	China U20		
- * Club domestic league appearances and goals as of 19 November 2026

Sun Jie (Chinese: 孙捷; pinyin: Sūn Jié; born 9 February 1991 in Dalian) is a Chinese professional footballer who currently plays for Chinese Super League club Qingdao West Coast.

== Club career ==
Sun started his professional football career in 2009 when he was promoted to Chinese Super League side Changchun Yatai's first team. He did not appear for Changchun in the 2009 league season. Sun began to play for the first team in the summer of 2010 as team manager Shen Xiangfu decided to give chances to young players. On 18 August, he made his senior debut in a 2–1 home victory against Shenzhen Ruby. Sun played 7 matches including starting 6 times in the 2010 league season. However, his playing time reduced in 2011 when he mainly spent his time in the reserve team league. He played 4 league matches in the 2012 season, all coming off the bench in the stoppage time. On 18 May 2013, he scored his first Super League goal against Dalian Aerbin in the 68th minute, which ensured Changchun's 2–2 draw.

At the end of the 2018 Chinese Super League campaign he would unfortunately be part of the squad that was relegated at the end of the season. On 29 March 2019, Sun was loaned to Eliteserien side Stabæk for the 2019 season. After making just three cup appearances for the Norwegian club, Sun returned to Changchun during the summer transfer window. He would once again establish himself as a regular member of the team at Changchun and at the end of the 2020 league campaign he would go on to win the division title with the club.

== Career statistics ==
Statistics accurate as of match played 31 December 2024.

Appearances and goals by club, season and competition
Club	Season	League			National Cup		Continental		Other		Total	
Club	Season	Division	Apps	Goals	Apps	Goals	Apps	Goals	Apps	Goals	Apps	Goals
Changchun Yatai	2009	Chinese Super League	0	0	-		-		-		0	0
Changchun Yatai	2010	Chinese Super League	7	0	-		0	0	-		7	0
Changchun Yatai	2011	Chinese Super League	2	0	0	0	-		-		2	0
Changchun Yatai	2012	Chinese Super League	4	0	0	0	-		-		4	0
Changchun Yatai	2013	Chinese Super League	10	1	1	0	-		-		11	1
Changchun Yatai	2014	Chinese Super League	25	0	1	0	-		-		26	0
Changchun Yatai	2015	Chinese Super League	29	2	0	0	-		-		29	2
Changchun Yatai	2016	Chinese Super League	21	0	0	0	-		-		21	0
Changchun Yatai	2017	Chinese Super League	24	1	0	0	-		-		24	1
Changchun Yatai	2018	Chinese Super League	27	1	0	0	-		-		27	1
Changchun Yatai	2019	China League One	14	1	0	0	-		-		14	1
Changchun Yatai	2020	China League One	14	0	2	0	-		-		16	0
Changchun Yatai	2021	Chinese Super League	21	2	2	0	-		-		23	2
Changchun Yatai	2022	Chinese Super League	19	0	1	0	-		-		20	0
Changchun Yatai	2023	Chinese Super League	1	0	1	0	-		-		2	0
Changchun Yatai	Total		218	8	7	0	0	0	0	0	225	8
Stabæk (loan)	2019	Eliteserien	0	0	3	0	-		-		3	0
Qingdao West Coast (loan)	2023	China League One	14	4	-		-		-		14	4
Qingdao West Coast (loan)	2024	Chinese Super League	8	0	0	0	-		-		8	0
Qingdao West Coast (loan)	Total		22	4	0	0	0	0	0	0	22	4
Career total			240	12	10	0	0	0	0	0	250	12

== Honours ==
=== Club ===
Changchun Yatai

- China League One: 2020.
