= Puwan New District Stadium =

Football stadium in Dalian, China

- Interactive map of Puwan New District Stadium
- Location: Puwan New District, Dalian, Liaoning, China
- Coordinates: 39.3529°N 121.8278°E
- Owner: Dalian Municipal Government
- Capacity: 30,000
- Surface: Grass

Construction
- Opened: 2003

Tenant
- Dalian Pro (former)

Puwan New District Stadium is a football-specific stadium located in Dalian, Liaoning, China. The stadium hosts football matches, concerts, and community events.

== History ==
The stadium was inaugurated in 2003 as part of Dalian's efforts to enhance its sports infrastructure and foster community engagement. It gained prominence as a key venue for domestic football matches and later became a temporary home for Dalian Pro, a Chinese Super League club. Over the years, the stadium has undergone upgrades.

== Design and architecture ==
Key design elements include:

- Wave-inspired structure: The roof's curvature mimics coastal waves, reflecting Dalian's maritime identity.
- Cutting-edge technology: Giant screens and advanced acoustics enhance spectator immersion during events.
- Accessible pathways: Public walking and jogging paths wrap around the exterior, open daily for recreational use.
