= Lanzhou Longyuan Athletic F.C. =

Association football club in China

Lanzhou Longyuan Athletic
- Full name: Lanzhou Longyuan Athletic Football Club 兰州陇原竞技足球俱乐部
- Founded: 2014; 12 years ago
- Ground: Lanzhou Olympic Center Stadium
- Capacity: 60,000
- Chairman: Zhang Zhenchuan
- Manager: Zhang Xiaorui
- League: China League Two
- 2025: China League Two, 13th of 24

Lanzhou Longyuan Athletic Football Club (Chinese: 兰州陇原竞技足球俱乐部; pinyin: Lánzhōu Lǒngyuán Jìngjì Zúqiú Jùlèbù) is a Chinese professional football club based in Lanzhou, Gansu, that competes in China League Two, the third tier of Chinese football. Lanzhou Longyuan Athletic plays its home matches at the Lanzhou Olympic Center Stadium, located within Qilihe District. Founded in 2014 as Rizhao Yuqi Football Club, the club relocated to Lanzhou in 2025 and changed to its current name.

== History ==
In 2014, the club were initially formed by amateur footballers as Rizhao Yuqi Football Club in Rizhao, Shandong. After a number of retired footballers joined the club, the club started participating in provincial or national competitions, being dominant back-to-back Rizhao Football League champions, and winning a Shandong FA Cup title. In 2017, the club entered the 2017 Chinese FA Cup qualifying round, although a draw and two losses saw Rizhao Yuqi finish bottom of their group, failing to advance to first round proper. After winning the Rizhao Championship League in 2021, Rizhao Yuqi were qualified to compete in the 2022 Chinese Champions League. They were drawn into a group with Dalian Duxing and Changchun Golden Kirin, and after picking up a win over Changchun Golden Kirin and a loss to Dalian Duxing, Rizhao Yuqi advanced to the elimination round. With the aggregate score at 2–2, Rizhao Yuqi prevailed on penalties over Yingkou Chaoyue to advance to the finals. After all seven matches, Rizhao Yuqi found themselves bottom of their group, only managing to pick up a single point.

With an overall 15th place Chinese Champions League finish in the previous season, Rizhao Yuqi re-entered the 2023 Chinese Champions League. Rizhao Yuqi played on home soil as the Chinese FA chose Rizhao as a host region, and after a 1–1 draw with Binzhou Huilong, Rizhao Yuqi qualified for the final round for a second consecutive time. In this period, the club also played a Chinese FA Cup tie, losing 6–1 at home to China League Two club Chongqing Tonglianglong. Drawn with Shenzhen Juniors and Xi'an Chongde Ronghai in the final round, Rizhao Yuqi finished fourth in the group of eight. It set up a knock-out tie with Dalian Huayi, which Rizhao Yuqi won 3–2 on penalties, advancing into the second round. On 28 October 2023, Rizhao Yuqi then faced off against Guangxi Hengchen in the second round of the knock-out stage; a win would mean guaranteed promotion to China League Two. A 5–4 defeat on penalties saw Rizhao Yuqi finish 6th, missing out on promotion. However, on 6 February 2024, Rizhao Yuqi were admitted into China League Two, as sufficient teams above them in the Chinese football pyramid have either pulled out or dissolved.

On 20 February 2025, the Chinese Football Association announced that Rizhao Yuqi had changed its name to Lanzhou Longyuan Athletic, following the completion of the club's relocation to Lanzhou, Gansu on 20 January.

== Players ==
=== First-team squad ===
As of 23 March 2024

Note: Flags indicate national team as defined under FIFA eligibility rules; some limited exceptions apply. Players may hold more than one non-FIFA nationality.

No.	Pos.	Nation	Player
1	GK	CHN	Zuo Zhenghong
2	DF	CHN	Chen Zefeng
4	DF	CHN	Xiao Yufeng
5	MF	CHN	Wang Jiong
6	DF	CHN	Wei Xin
7	FW	CHN	Sun Yue
8	MF	CHN	Lu Chenghe
9	FW	CHN	Bai Tianci
10	MF	CHN	Pan Yuchen
11	FW	CHN	Tai Jianfeng
13	GK	CHN	Yu Ziqin
14	MF	CHN	Ying Yuxiao
15	DF	CHN	Liu Yang
16	GK	CHN	Mu Qianyu
17	FW	CHN	Wang Zeyang
18	MF	CHN	Zeng Yuming
19	MF	CHN	Chen Zitong
20	DF	CHN	Li Yu

No.	Pos.	Nation	Player
21	DF	CHN	Yan Qihang (on loan from Qingdao West Coast)
22	MF	CHN	Liu Zefeng
23	MF	CHN	Guo Ze
25	MF	CHN	Liu Zongyang
27	DF	CHN	Li Gongtai
28	MF	CHN	Iskender Esqer
29	MF	CHN	Zhang Ziyouyi
33	MF	CHN	Gao Yixuan (on loan from Qingdao Hainiu)
45	DF	CHN	Chen Yu
47	MF	CHN	Su Jiale (on loan from Shandong Taishan)
49	MF	CHN	Wang Tao (on loan from Qingdao Hainiu)
54	DF	CHN	Turghunjan Memetqayir
55	DF	CHN	Li Zhenyu
56	DF	CHN	Li Shuaichen
57	DF	CHN	Xu Zhaoxiang
58	MF	CHN	Shi Letian
59	FW	CHN	Zha Mingjian

== Managerial staff ==
Position	Staff
Head coach	(China) Zhang Xiaorui
Assistant coach	(China) Hu Wei
Goalkeeping coach	(China) Sheng Peng
