= List of Chinese football transfers winter 2019 =

This is a list of Chinese football transfers for the 2019 season winter transfer window. Super League and League One transfer window opened on 1 January 2019 and closed on 28 February 2019. It extended for three days to 3 March 2019 especially for the transfer in of Shaanxi Chang'an Athletic and transfer out of Yanbian Funde after Yanbian Funde was disqualified for the 2019 season due to owing taxes.

== Super League ==
=== Beijing Renhe ===
In:

No.	Pos.	Nation	Player
2	DF	CHN	Du Wenyang (from Hebei China Fortune)
6	MF	CHN	Zhang Wenzhao (loan from Guangzhou Evergrande Taobao)
10	MF	NGA	Sone Aluko (loan from (England) Reading)
19	GK	CHN	Liu Peng (from Qingdao Huanghai)
23	GK	CHN	Mou Pengfei (from Heilongjiang Lava Spring)
37	FW	CHN	Yang Yihu (loan return from Heilongjiang Lava Spring)
-	MF	CHN	Chen Liming (loan return from Heilongjiang Lava Spring)
-	DF	CHN	Xu Jiajun (loan return from Yanbian Beiguo)
-	FW	CHN	Fan Bojian (loan return from Heilongjiang Lava Spring)

Out:

No.	Pos.	Nation	Player
1	GK	CHN	Xu Jiamin (loan to Heilongjiang Lava Spring)
2	DF	CHN	Yu Bin (to Qingdao Huanghai)
6	DF	CHN	Wang Qiang (Retired)
9	FW	CHN	Han Peng (Retired)
19	MF	CHN	Chen Liming (loan to Heilongjiang Lava Spring)
22	FW	CHN	Wang Gang (to Beijing Sinobo Guoan)
23	DF	CHN	Liu Yang (to Tianjin TEDA)
33	MF	CHN	Wang Chu (loan return to (Portugal) Cova da Piedade)
38	FW	CMR	Benjamin Moukandjo (loan return to Jiangsu Suning)
41	DF	CHN	Ma Yangyang (to Shaanxi Chang'an Athletic)
42	DF	CHN	Liu Xiangwei (loan to Heilongjiang Lava Spring)
44	GK	CHN	Ci Henglong (to Heilongjiang Lava Spring)
55	MF	CHN	Cui Yijie (Released)
56	GK	CHN	Sheng Peng (to Inner Mongolia Zhongyou)
57	MF	CHN	Li Shisen (Released)
-	GK	CHN	Qian Wenlong (to Heilongjiang Lava Spring)
-	DF	CHN	Guo Hongwei (to Heilongjiang Lava Spring)
-	MF	CHN	Chen Zhichao (to Heilongjiang Lava Spring)
-	DF	CHN	Xu Jiajun (to Taizhou Yuanda)
-	FW	CHN	Fan Bojian (to Heilongjiang Lava Spring)

=== Beijing Sinobo Guoan ===
In:

No.	Pos.	Nation	Player
2	DF	KOR	Kim Min-jae (from (South Korea) Jeonbuk Hyundai Motors)
7	MF	NOR	Hou Yongyong (from (Norway) Stabæk) (Note: Player took Chinese citizenship to sign for club)
9	FW	CHN	Zhang Yuning (from (England) West Bromwich Albion)
14	GK	CHN	Zou Dehai (from Zhejiang Greentown)
23	MF	CHN	Li Ke (from (England) Brentford)
27	FW	CHN	Wang Gang (from Beijing Renhe)
-	DF	CHN	Jin Pengxiang (loan return from Dalian Yifang)
-	DF	CHN	Sheng Pengfei (loan return from Taizhou Yuanda)
-	MF	CHN	Du Mingyang (loan return from Hubei Chufeng Heli)

Out:

No.	Pos.	Nation	Player
7	MF	CHN	Wei Shihao (to Guangzhou Evergrande Taobao)
9	FW	ESP	Jonathan Soriano (to (Saudi Arabia) Al-Hilal)
14	DF	CHN	Jin Pengxiang (loan to Guangzhou R&F)
27	FW	CHN	Zhu Chaoqing (Released)
33	GK	CHN	Chi Wenyi (loan to Hebei China Fortune)
43	MF	CHN	Wen Wubin (to Sichuan Longfor)
44	DF	CHN	Huang Chao (to Sichuan Longfor)
50	DF	CHN	Yang Kaideng (Released)
54	MF	CHN	Geng Junyi (to Beijing BIT)
56	DF	CHN	Sun Chengwei (to Qingdao Huanghai)
57	GK	CHN	Chen Biao (Released)
59	DF	CHN	Wang Weibo (to Guangzhou South China Tiger)
60	MF	CHN	Li Hanbo (Released)
62	DF	CHN	Liu Jishen (Released)
-	DF	CHN	Sheng Pengfei (to Taizhou Yuanda)
-	MF	CHN	Du Mingyang (to Meizhou Hakka)
-	FW	CHN	Zhang Jiajun (to Jiangxi Liansheng)

=== Chongqing Dangdai Lifan ===
In:

No.	Pos.	Nation	Player
1	GK	CHN	Yerjet Yerzat (from (Portugal) Gondomar)
3	DF	CHN	Yang Shuai (from Liaoning F.C.)
5	DF	CHN	Jiang Zhe (from Changchun Yatai)
9	MF	POL	Adrian Mierzejewski (from Changchun Yatai)
18	DF	CHN	Dong Honglin (from Dalian Yifang)
21	GK	CHN	Wang Zixiang (from (Spain) Granada CF)
25	MF	CHN	Baxtiyar Pezila (from Xinjiang Tianshan Leopard)
33	DF	CHN	Dilmurat Mawlanyaz (from Xinjiang Tianshan Leopard)
41	MF	CHN	Jiang Yu (from Heilongjiang Lava Spring)
44	FW	CHN	Zhang Cheng (loan return from Shanghai Sunfun)
45	MF	CHN	Wen Haitao (from Shanghai SIPG)
48	MF	CHN	Xirzat Helil (from Huizhou Huixin)
55	FW	CHN	Chen Pengyu (from Shanghai SIPG)
-	DF	CHN	Wang Anping (from Inner Mongolia Zhongyou)
-	DF	CHN	Liao Junjie (loan return from Shanghai Sunfun)
-	MF	CHN	Cao Yanan (loan return from Shanghai Sunfun)

Out:

No.	Pos.	Nation	Player
1	GK	CHN	Deng Xiaofei (loan to Zhejiang Greentown)
9	DF	CHN	Liu Yu (to Chengdu Better City)
21	DF	CHN	Sui Donglu (to Henan Jianye)
25	GK	CHN	Chen Anqi (to Kunshan F.C.)
34	FW	BRA	Sebá (loan return to (Greece) Olympiacos)
45	DF	CHN	Zhang Xiaotian (Released)
48	MF	CHN	Chen Yi (Released)
54	FW	CHN	Fang Zhengyang (Released)
55	DF	CHN	You Jiabin (Released)
-	MF	CHN	Sheng Chunlin (to Jiangxi Liansheng)

=== Dalian Yifang ===
In:

No.	Pos.	Nation	Player
2	DF	CHN	Zhao Mingjian (from Hebei China Fortune)
5	FW	HKG	Alex Akande (from Yanbian Funde)
7	MF	CHN	Zhao Xuri (from Tianjin Tianhai)
16	MF	CHN	Qin Sheng (from Shanghai Greenland Shenhua)
17	MF	SVK	Marek Hamšík (from (Italy) Napoli)
21	FW	GHA	Emmanuel Boateng (from (Spain) Levante)
25	DF	CHN	Li Jianbin (from Shanghai Greenland Shenhua)
31	MF	CHN	Zheng Long (loan from Guangzhou Evergrande Taobao)
35	DF	CHN	Yang Shanping (from Tianjin Tianhai)
41	MF	CHN	Li Qinghao (from Tianjin Tianhai)
43	DF	CHN	Bi Guangfu (from Tianjin Tianhai)
44	MF	CHN	Zhang Yuhao (from Shanghai Greenland Shenhua)
49	MF	CHN	Pang Chuntao (from Tianjin Tianhai)
60	DF	CHN	Yang Zexiang (from Dalian Transcendence)
-	DF	CHN	Wang Wanpeng (loan return from Dalian Transcendence)
-	DF	CHN	Fu Yuncheng (loan return from Dalian Chanjoy)
-	FW	CHN	Duan Yunzi (loan return from Sichuan Longfor)

Out:

No.	Pos.	Nation	Player
2	DF	CHN	Wang Wanpeng (to Yinchuan Helanshan)
7	DF	CHN	Wang Liang (loan to Dalian Chanjoy)
9	MF	ARG	Nicolás Gaitán (to (United States) Chicago Fire)
14	DF	CHN	Yan Peng (to Shenzhen Pengcheng)
15	MF	CHN	Jin Qiang (to Shenzhen F.C.)
16	MF	CHN	Qin Sheng (loan return to Shanghai Greenland Shenhua)
21	MF	CHN	Liu Yingchen (loan to Shanghai Shenxin)
25	DF	CHN	Jin Pengxiang (loan return to Beijing Guoan)
27	DF	CHN	Zheng Jianfeng (loan to Dalian Chanjoy)
28	FW	COL	Duvier Riascos (to (Chile) CD Universidad Católica)
31	DF	CHN	Yang Shanping (loan return to Tianjin Tianhai)
36	DF	CHN	Dong Honglin (to Chongqing Dangdai Lifan)
41	DF	CHN	Li Yang (Released)
43	GK	CHN	Su Jinyi (Released)
44	MF	CHN	Yuan Hao (loan to Shanghai Shenxin)
46	DF	CHN	Zhu Jiaxuang (Released)
47	MF	CHN	Wang Zhilei (Released)
48	MF	CHN	Gao Mingxin (loan to Dalian Chanjoy)
49	MF	CHN	Lin Zhiqiang (Released)
50	MF	CHN	Zhang Zimin (Released)
52	MF	CHN	Ruan Yingming (to Shandong Wangyue)
53	DF	CHN	Yin Jiahao (loan to Shenzhen Pengcheng)
58	MF	CHN	Han Peijiang (loan to Dalian Chanjoy)
60	MF	CHN	Liu Jiqiang (Released)
62	DF	CHN	Zhang Yuning (Released)
63	MF	CHN	Li Yuqiu (loan to Yinchuan Helanshan)
64	MF	CHN	Meng Xiangbin (Released)
65	MF	CHN	Zhang Junhao (Released)
67	MF	CHN	Liang Wenchao (to Shenzhen F.C.)
68	DF	CHN	Pei Zhanpeng (to Suzhou Dongwu)
69	MF	CHN	Jiang Tao (Released)
-	DF	CHN	Fu Yuncheng (to Guangzhou R&F)
-	FW	CHN	Duan Yunzi (to Sichuan Longfor)
-	MF	CHN	Ren Jiawei (loan to Dalian Chanjoy)

=== Guangzhou Evergrande Taobao ===
In:

No.	Pos.	Nation	Player
2	DF	CHN	Liu Yiming (from Tianjin Tianhai)
4	DF	ENG	Tyias Browning (from (England) Everton)
7	MF	CHN	Wei Shihao (from Beijing Sinobo Guoan)
8	MF	BRA	Paulinho (from (Spain) Barcelona)
9	MF	BRA	Talisca (from (Portugal) Benfica)
11	MF	CHN	Zhang Xiuwei (from Tianjin Tianhai)
13	MF	CHN	He Chao (from Changchun Yatai)
15	MF	CHN	Yan Dinghao (loan from (Portugal) Gondomar)
21	DF	CHN	Gao Zhunyi (from Hebei China Fortune)
23	DF	KOR	Park Ji-soo (from (South Korea) Gyeongnam FC)
56	MF	CHN	Li Geng (loan return from Dalian Transcendence)
-	DF	CHN	Yang Zhaohui (loan return from (South Korea) Busan FC)
-	DF	CHN	Liu Haidong (loan return from Hainan Boying)
-	MF	CHN	Chen Zijie (loan return from Yinchuan Helanshan)
-	FW	CHN	Wang Jingbin (loan return from Shanghai Shenxin)
-	DF	CHN	Wang Shangyuan (loan return from Henan Jianye)
-	DF	CHN	Rong Hao (loan return from Shanghai Greenland Shenhua)
-	DF	CHN	Wu Shaocong (from (Japan) Shimizu S-Pulse)
-	MF	PER	Roberto Siucho (from (Peru) Universitario)
-	GK	CHN	Fang Zihong (loan return from Inner Mongolia Zhongyou)
-	DF	CHN	Guan Haojin (loan return from Yinchuan Helanshan)
-	DF	CHN	Liu Ruicheng (loan return from Inner Mongolia Zhongyou)
-	MF	CHN	Wu Yue (loan return from Shenzhen Pengcheng)
-	MF	CHN	Zhang Jiaqi (loan return from Guangzhou R&F)
-	FW	CHN	Ye Guochen (loan return from Yinchuan Helanshan)

Out:

No.	Pos.	Nation	Player
2	MF	CHN	Liao Lisheng (loan to Tianjin Tianhai)
7	FW	BRA	Alan (loan to Tianjin Tianhai)
9	MF	BRA	Paulinho (loan return to (Spain) Barcelona)
11	MF	BRA	Ricardo Goulart (loan to (Brazil) Palmeiras)
12	DF	CHN	Wang Shangyuan (to Henan Jianye)
14	DF	CHN	Rong Hao (loan to Tianjin TEDA)
15	MF	CHN	Zhang Wenzhao (loan to Beijing Renhe)
18	DF	CHN	Guo Jing (loan to Inner Mongolia Zhongyou)
21	DF	CHN	Zhang Chenglin (loan to Tianjin Tianhai)
24	MF	BRA	Talisca (loan return to (Portugal) Benfica)
25	DF	CHN	Zou Zheng (to Guangzhou R&F)
27	MF	CHN	Zheng Long (loan to Dalian Yifang)
28	DF	KOR	Kim Young-gwon (to (Japan) Gamba Osaka)
36	MF	CHN	Deng Yubiao (loan to Guangzhou South China Tiger)
39	MF	CHN	Tan Kaiyuan (to Guangdong FA U19)
42	DF	CHN	Wen Jiabao (loan to Tianjin Tianhai)
46	DF	CHN	Zhou Chenye (Released)
47	DF	CHN	Chen Zepeng (loan to Beijing BSU)
54	DF	CHN	Lü Zheng (Released)
56	MF	CHN	Li Zhongyi (to Zibo Cuju)
58	FW	CHN	Wang Jinze (loan to Inner Mongolia Zhongyou)
61	GK	CHN	Liu Weiguo (loan to Inner Mongolia Zhongyou)
62	DF	CHN	Gong Liangxuan (to Shenzhen Pengcheng)
63	MF	CHN	Ju Feng (loan to Changchun Yatai)
65	MF	CHN	Zhao Shijie (Released)
68	FW	CHN	Yang Chaosheng (to Changchun Yatai)
-	DF	CHN	Wu Shaocong (loan to (Japan) Kyoto Sanga)
-	MF	PER	Roberto Siucho (loan to Shanghai Shenxin)
-	GK	CHN	Fang Zihong (to Chengdu Better City)
-	DF	CHN	Guan Haojin (loan to Hebei Aoli Jingying)
-	DF	CHN	Liu Ruicheng (loan to Xinjiang Tianshan Leopard)
-	MF	CHN	Wu Yue (loan to Zibo Cuju)
-	MF	CHN	Zhang Jiaqi (loan to Qingdao Huanghai)
-	FW	CHN	Ye Guochen (loan to Wuhan Three Towns)
-	GK	CHN	Li Weijie (loan to Shanghai Shenxin)
-	GK	CHN	Li Zhizhao (to Qingdao Huanghai)
-	MF	CHN	Lu Haolin (to Qingdao Huanghai)
-	MF	CHN	Dilyimit Tudi (to Xinjiang Tianshan Leopard)
-	MF	CHN	Shewket Yalqun (loan to Xinjiang Tianshan Leopard)
-	MF	CHN	Liao Jintao (to Wuhan Three Towns)

=== Guangzhou R&F ===
In:

No.	Pos.	Nation	Player
2	DF	CHN	Zou Zheng (from Guangzhou Evergrande Taobao)
6	MF	CHN	Fan Yunlong (from Guizhou Hengfeng)
8	MF	BEL	Mousa Dembélé (from (England) Tottenham Hotspur)
9	FW	CHN	Gui Hong (from Hebei China Fortune)
10	MF	ISR	Dia Saba (from (Israel) Hapoel Be'er Sheva)
13	MF	CHN	Ye Chugui (loan return from Shenzhen F.C.)
22	GK	CHN	Han Jiaqi (from (Portugal) C.D. Aves)
27	DF	CHN	Jin Pengxiang (loan from Beijing Sinobo Guoan)
30	MF	CHN	Wang Peng (from (Portugal) Gondomar)
33	FW	CHN	Jin Bo (from Yanbian Funde)
41	GK	CHN	Yin Tianlong (from Hebei China Fortune)
46	DF	CHN	Li Long (from Yanbian Funde)
47	DF	CHN	Hu Diji (from Hebei China Fortune)
53	FW	CHN	Geng Taili (from (Spain) Atlético Madrid)
55	DF	CHN	Zhang Fushun (from Yanbian Funde)
56	DF	CHN	Fu Yuncheng (from Dalian Yifang)
-	GK	CHN	Pei Chensong (loan return from Hainan Boying)

Out:

No.	Pos.	Nation	Player
5	MF	CHN	Zhang Jiaqi (loan return to Guangzhou Evergrande)
8	MF	BRA	Júnior Urso (to (Brazil) Corinthians)
9	FW	CHN	Chang Feiya (loan to Wuhan Zall)
10	MF	BRA	Renatinho (loan to Tianjin Tianhai)
27	MF	CHN	Zhang Jiajie (loan to Sichuan Longfor)
30	MF	CHN	Wang Peng (loan return to (Portugal) Gondomar)
47	MF	CHN	Pan Jiajun (Released)
50	DF	CHN	Zhang Jianjun (Released)
52	MF	CHN	Yao Jialin (Released)
-	GK	CHN	Pei Chensong (Released)
-	FW	CHN	Cui Hongyu (to Nantong Zhiyun)
-	FW	BRA	Bruninho (Released)

=== Hebei China Fortune ===
In:

No.	Pos.	Nation	Player
2	MF	CHN	Zhang Junzhe (from Beijing BSU)
5	DF	HKG	Andy Russell (from Liaoning F.C.)
10	FW	BRA	Marcão (from (South Korea) Gyeongnam FC)
33	GK	CHN	Chi Wenyi (loan from Beijing Sinobo Guoan)
47	DF	CHN	Chen Yunhua (from (Japan) Grulla Morioka)
-	DF	CHN	Liao Junjian (loan return from Wuhan Zall)

Out:

No.	Pos.	Nation	Player
1	GK	CHN	Ou Ya (Released)
2	DF	CHN	Zhao Mingjian (to Dalian Yifang)
5	DF	CHN	Lang Zheng (Retired)
10	MF	BRA	Hernanes (to (Brazil) São Paulo)
11	MF	CHN	Gui Hong (to Guangzhou R&F)
16	DF	CHN	Du Wenyang (to Beijing Renhe)
17	FW	CHN	Song Wenjie (to Shandong Luneng)
33	DF	CHN	Gao Zhunyi (to Guangzhou Evergrande Taobao)
43	MF	CHN	Zhang Hui (loan to Wuhan Three Towns)
46	MF	CHN	Merdanjan Abduklijan (to Wuhan Three Towns)
47	DF	CHN	Wu Guodong (Released)
52	MF	CHN	Wang Chenyang (to Qingdao Red Lions)
53	DF	CHN	Wu Qingtao (to Shenzhen Bogang)
55	FW	CHN	Ma Dongliang (to Zibo Cuju)
56	MF	CHN	Zhao Xiaotian (to Baoding Yingli Yitong)
57	MF	CHN	Li Haoran (Released)
58	MF	CHN	Lu Yang (to Chengdu Better City)
59	MF	CHN	Jia Xiaochen (to Shenyang Urban)
60	MF	CHN	Zhang Lifeng (Released)
-	DF	CHN	Liao Junjian (to Wuhan Zall)
-	DF	TUR	Ersan Gülüm (to (Australia) Whittlesea United)
-	MF	CHN	Yao Xuchen (loan to Beijing BSU)
-	MF	CHN	Chen Ao (loan to Wuhan Zall)
-	DF	CHN	Sheng Shuo (to Jilin Baijia)
-	GK	CHN	Yin Tianlong (to Guangzhou R&F)
-	DF	CHN	Hu Diji (to Guangzhou R&F)

=== Henan Jianye ===
In:

No.	Pos.	Nation	Player
3	FW	CHN	Zhang Wentao (from Shanghai Shenxin)
8	MF	TPE	Tim Chow (from (Serbia) Spartak Subotica)
9	FW	BRA	Henrique Dourado (from (Brazil) Flamengo)
14	FW	CMR	Franck Ohandza (from Shenzhen F.C.)
21	DF	CHN	Sui Donglu (from Chongqing Dangdai Lifan)
26	DF	CHN	Wang Shangyuan (from Guangzhou Evergrande Taobao)
31	DF	CHN	Huang Chuang (from (Portugal) Gondomar)
32	MF	CHN	Zhang Xu (from (Portugal) Gondomar)
58	MF	CHN	Yuan Ye (from Hebei Aoli Jingying)
59	DF	CHN	Song Haiwang (from Zhejiang Greentown)
60	MF	CHN	Ni Yusong (from Liaoning F.C.)
-	DF	CHN	Luo Heng (loan return from Hebei Aoli Jingying)
-	FW	CHN	Chen Zijie (loan return from Shenyang Urban)
-	GK	CHN	Wei Peng (loan return from Fujian Tianxin)
-	DF	GNB	Eddi Gomes (loan return from (Iceland) FH)
-	MF	CZE	Bořek Dočkal (loan return from (United States) Philadelphia Union)

Out:

No.	Pos.	Nation	Player
9	FW	POR	Ricardo Vaz Tê (to Qingdao Huanghai)
12	GK	CHN	Wei Peng (loan to Fujian Tianxin)
26	DF	CHN	Wang Shangyuan (loan return to Guangzhou Evergrande Taobao)
31	MF	CHN	Gu Wenxiang (to Kunshan F.C.)
32	FW	CHN	Yan Hao (loan to Inner Mongolia Caoshangfei)
33	DF	CHN	Li Xinze (loan to Suzhou Dongwu)
37	FW	BRA	Fernando Karanga (loan to (Brazil) Nacional)
39	FW	CHN	Hu Jinghang (loan return to Shanghai SIPG)
41	FW	CHN	Han Zixuan (to Tianjin TEDA)
43	GK	CHN	Pan Qihao (loan to Inner Mongolia Caoshangfei)
46	MF	CHN	Zhao Zongwei (Released)
47	MF	CHN	Cheng Zihao (Released)
50	DF	CHN	Chen Chengye (loan to Inner Mongolia Caoshangfei)
51	MF	CHN	Wang Wei (Released)
52	DF	CHN	Ou Weitao (Released)
54	DF	CHN	Xiong Meitao (loan to Inner Mongolia Caoshangfei)
55	MF	CHN	Li Dongze (loan to Inner Mongolia Caoshangfei)
56	DF	CHN	Huang Junjun (Released)
57	DF	CHN	Tan Lixuan (Released)
58	MF	CHN	Dong Zhihua (Released)
59	FW	CHN	Jia Yinbo (to Beijing BSU)
60	DF	CHN	Xie Shuo (Released)
61	DF	CHN	Zhu Yuansong (Released)
64	FW	CHN	Wu Xiaobo (to Beijing BSU)
65	GK	CHN	Niu Ben (to Shenzhen Bogang)
-	DF	GNB	Eddi Gomes (Released)
-	MF	CZE	Bořek Dočkal (to (Czech Republic) Sparta Prague)

=== Jiangsu Suning ===
In:

No.	Pos.	Nation	Player
8	FW	CHN	Feng Boyuan (from Liaoning F.C.)
17	MF	CHN	Luo Jing (from Zhejiang Greentown)
30	MF	CHN	Ye Chongqiu (from Shanghai Shenxin)
-	DF	CHN	Li Shizhou (loan return from Zhejiang Yiteng)
-	DF	KOR	Hong Jeong-ho (loan return from (South Korea) Jeonbuk Hyundai Motors)
-	MF	CHN	Chen Ji (loan return from Guizhou Hengfeng)
-	FW	CMR	Benjamin Moukandjo (loan return from Beijing Renhe)

Out:

No.	Pos.	Nation	Player
8	MF	CHN	Liu Jianye (loan to Guangzhou South China Tiger)
12	MF	CHN	Zhang Xiaobin (loan to Tianjin Tianhai)
17	FW	CHN	Erpan Ezimjan (loan to Shaanxi Chang'an Athletic)
25	GK	CHN	Jiang Hao (to Beijing BSU)
37	DF	CHN	Liang Jinhu (loan to Nanjing Shaye)
43	DF	CHN	Zhu Qinggui (Released)
45	MF	CHN	Hu Zhifeng (loan to Guangxi Baoyun)
47	DF	CHN	Xu Youzhi (to Nanjing Balanta)
48	MF	CHN	Zhang Xinlin (loan to Taizhou Yuanda)
50	FW	CHN	Ge Wei (to Taizhou Yuanda)
54	DF	CHN	Xie Xiaofan (loan to Zibo Cuju)
55	DF	CHN	Wang Xijie (loan to Suzhou Dongwu)
57	MF	CHN	Lian Fa (Released)
-	DF	KOR	Hong Jeong-ho (loan to (South Korea) Jeonbuk Hyundai Motors)
-	MF	CHN	Chen Ji (to Guizhou Hengfeng)
-	FW	CHN	Wang Chuqi (loan to Kunshan F.C.)
-	FW	CMR	Benjamin Moukandjo (Released)
-	DF	CHN	Gu Huajiang (to Nantong Zhiyun)

=== Shandong Luneng Taishan ===
In:

No.	Pos.	Nation	Player
25	MF	BEL	Marouane Fellaini (from (England) Manchester United)
28	MF	CHN	Chen Kerui (loan return from Meizhou Hakka)
37	MF	CHN	Huang Cong (from (Portugal) Gondomar)
41	DF	CHN	Wu Lei (from Tianjin Tianhai)
42	FW	CHN	Song Wenjie (from Hebei China Fortune)
44	DF	CHN	Gao Xin (loan return from Beijing BSU)
46	MF	CHN	Zhang Chen (loan return from Sichuan Jiuniu)
47	MF	CHN	Luo Andong (from Inner Mongolia Zhongyou)
48	DF	CHN	Yu Chenglei (loan return from Sichuan Jiuniu)
51	MF	CHN	Sun Rui (loan return from Zibo Cuju)
53	MF	CHN	Xu Anbang (loan return from Zibo Cuju)
55	MF	CHN	Liu Li (loan return from Sichuan Jiuniu)
57	FW	CHN	Ji Shengpan (loan return from Zibo Cuju)
-	DF	CHN	Wang Jiong (loan return from Sichuan Jiuniu)
-	GK	CHN	Sun Qihang (loan return from Zibo Cuju)
-	MF	CHN	He Tongshuai (loan return from Zibo Cuju)
-	MF	CHN	Liu Changqi (loan return from Zibo Cuju)
-	MF	CHN	Sun Yi (loan return from Zibo Cuju)
-	MF	CHN	Cui Wei (loan return from Meizhou Hakka)
-	FW	CHN	Bai Tianci (loan return from Guangzhou South China Tiger)

Out:

No.	Pos.	Nation	Player
8	FW	CHN	Guo Tianyu (loan to Wuhan Zall)
9	FW	BRA	Diego Tardelli (to (Brazil) Grêmio)
28	MF	CHN	Yao Junsheng (loan to Tianjin Tianhai)
37	DF	CHN	Wang Jiong (loan to Beijing BSU)
42	FW	CHN	Huang Pu (to Shaanxi Chang'an Athletic)
44	MF	CHN	Cheng Pu (Released)
49	DF	CHN	Zhang Dapeng (to Heze Caozhou)
51	FW	CHN	Tian Yuda (loan to Beijing BSU)
54	DF	CHN	Cai Shirun (to Taizhou Yuanda)
55	MF	CHN	Zhou Zehao (to Heze Caozhou)
59	MF	CHN	Ma Shuai (loan to (Brazil) Desportivo Brasil)
-	MF	CHN	Wu Xingyu (loan to (Brazil) Desportivo Brasil)
-	GK	CHN	Sun Qihang (to Zibo Cuju)
-	MF	CHN	He Tongshuai (to Zibo Cuju)
-	MF	CHN	Liu Changqi (to Zibo Cuju)
-	MF	CHN	Sun Yi (to Zibo Cuju)
-	MF	CHN	Cui Wei (to Meizhou Hakka)
-	FW	CHN	Bai Tianci (loan to Kunshan F.C.)
-	DF	CHN	Tang Kangbeiyi (to Kunshan F.C.)
-	DF	CHN	Tang Qirun (loan to Yunnan Kunlu)
-	DF	CHN	Ou Li (loan to Yunnan Kunlu)
-	FW	CHN	Feng Haotian (loan to Yunnan Kunlu)
-	FW	CHN	Han Yuhao (to Zibo Cuju)
-	FW	CHN	Mao Jinpeng (to Liaoning Whowin)
-	MF	CHN	Hao Shijie (to Shenzhen F.C.)
-	MF	CHN	Zhu Youkang (to Baoding Yingli Yitong)

=== Shanghai Greenland Shenhua ===
In:

No.	Pos.	Nation	Player
9	FW	NGA	Odion Ighalo (from Changchun Yatai)
17	MF	CHN	Wu Yizhen (from Shanghai Shenxin)
26	MF	CHN	Qian Jiegei (from (Bulgaria) Vereya) (Note: Player took Chinese citizenship to sign for club)
51	MF	CHN	Liu Jiawei (loan return from Xinjiang Tianshan Leopard)
52	DF	CHN	Deng Biao (loan return from Xinjiang Tianshan Leopard)
-	MF	CHN	Qin Sheng (loan return from Dalian Yifang)
-	MF	CHN	Wang Shouting (loan return from Changchun Yatai)
-	MF	CHN	Yan Ge (loan return from Baotou Nanjiao)
-	MF	CHN	Zhang Yuhao (loan return from Baotou Nanjiao)
-	MF	CHN	Cui Qi (loan return from Baotou Nanjiao)

Out:

No.	Pos.	Nation	Player
3	DF	CHN	Li Jianbin (to Dalian Yifang)
9	FW	SEN	Demba Ba (to (Turkey) İstanbul Başakşehir)
17	FW	NGA	Obafemi Martins (Released)
19	DF	CHN	Li Xiaoming (to Changchun Yatai)
20	MF	CHN	Wang Yun (Retired)
22	GK	CHN	Qiu Shengjiong (to Guangzhou South China Tiger)
24	DF	CHN	Rong Hao (loan return to Guangzhou Evergrande)
25	DF	CHN	Wang Lin (Released)
26	MF	CHN	Qin Sheng (to Dalian Yifang)
30	DF	CHN	Tao Jin (Retired)
44	FW	CHN	Gao Shipeng (to Shanxi Metropolis)
46	MF	CHN	Pan Weihao (Released)
50	GK	CHN	Yu Qixuan (to Hangzhou Wuyue Qiantang)
53	MF	CHN	Chen Tao (loan to Jilin Baijia)
54	FW	CHN	Sun Xipeng (loan to Shanghai Shenxin)
56	DF	CHN	Cao Chuanyu (loan to Shanghai Shenxin)
57	MF	CHN	Chen Xiaomao (Released)
58	MF	CHN	Leng Shiao (to Shaanxi Chang'an Athletic)
64	GK	CHN	Peng Peng (loan to Shanghai Shenxin)
67	MF	CHN	Xu Yue (loan to Shanghai Shenxin)
-	MF	CHN	Wang Shouting (to Guizhou Hengfeng)
-	MF	CHN	Yan Ge (to Jiangxi Liansheng)
-	MF	CHN	Zhang Yuhao (to Dalian Yifang)
-	MF	CHN	Cui Qi (to Shaanxi Chang'an Athletic)
-	DF	CHN	Xu Xiao (to Changchun Yatai)
-	MF	CHN	Jiang Lei (to Guizhou Hengfeng)

=== Shanghai SIPG ===
In:

No.	Pos.	Nation	Player
19	FW	CHN	Hu Jinghang (loan return from Henan Jianye)
20	DF	CHN	Yang Shiyuan (loan return from Suzhou Dongwu)
48	DF	CHN	Yang Fan (loan return from Suzhou Dongwu)
-	FW	CHN	Gao Zhijie (loan return from Nantong Zhiyun)
-	MF	CHN	Jiang Zilei (loan return from Wuhan Zall)
-	DF	CHN	Wei Lai (loan return from Shanghai Shenxin)
-	FW	CHN	Zhu Zhengrong (loan return from Nantong Zhiyun)
-	MF	CHN	Wang Jiajie (loan return from Shanghai Shenxin)
-	MF	CHN	Gong Chunjie (loan return from Kunshan F.C.)
-	MF	CHN	Zheng Zhiyun (loan return from Qingdao Huanghai)

Out:

No.	Pos.	Nation	Player
7	FW	CHN	Wu Lei (to (Spain) Espanyol)
30	FW	CHN	Gao Zhijie (to Nantong Zhiyun)
31	MF	CHN	Jiang Zilei (to Wuhan Zall)
38	DF	CHN	Wei Lai (loan to Nantong Zhiyun)
57	FW	CHN	Zhu Zhengrong (to Kunshan FC)
58	MF	CHN	Wu Hang (loan to Jilin Baijia)
59	MF	CHN	Sun Enming (loan to Nantong Zhiyun)
61	MF	CHN	Chen Chunxin (Released)
63	MF	CHN	Shang Wenjie (Released)
64	MF	CHN	Zheng Zelong (loan to Hangzhou Wuyue Qiantang)
66	DF	CHN	Zhang Yunkai (loan to Hangzhou Wuyue Qiantang)
67	DF	CHN	Zheng Huangkai (to Shanghai Chengxun)
68	MF	CHN	Zheng Haoqian (to Nantong Zhiyun)
69	DF	CHN	Lu Xiaorui (to Shanghai Chengxun)
-	MF	CHN	Wang Jiajie (loan to Kunshan FC)
-	MF	CHN	Gong Chunjie (loan to Kunshan FC)
-	MF	CHN	Zheng Zhiyun (to Shijiazhuang Ever Bright)
-	MF	CHN	Wen Haitao (to Chongqing Dangdai Lifan)
-	FW	CHN	Chen Pengyu (to Chongqing Dangdai Lifan)

=== Shenzhen F.C. ===
In:

No.	Pos.	Nation	Player
6	MF	CHN	Li Qiang (from Yanbian Funde)
7	FW	NOR	Ola Kamara (from (United States) LA Galaxy)
10	MF	NOR	Ole Selnæs (from (France) Saint-Étienne)
13	DF	CHN	Wang Weilong (loan return from Meizhou Hakka)
14	DF	SEN	Cheikh M'Bengue (from (France) Saint-Étienne)
17	DF	CHN	Zhou Xin (from (Norway) Stabæk)
23	GK	CHN	Guo Wei (from Shanghai Shenxin)
25	MF	CHN	Wang Peng (from Shijiazhuang Ever Bright)
26	MF	CHN	Jin Qiang (from Dalian Yifang)
31	MF	CHN	Li Yuanyi (from Tianjin Teda)
41	MF	CHN	Shi Yiyi (from Shanghai Shenxin)
51	DF	CHN	Wei Liping (from Meizhou Hakka)
52	MF	CHN	Hao Shijie (from Shandong Luneng)
59	MF	CHN	Liang Wenchao (from Dalian Yifang)
60	MF	CHN	Yang Guicheng (from Shijiazhuang Ever Bright)
-	MF	CHN	Tan Binliang (loan return from Nantong Zhiyun)
-	FW	BRA	Rossi (loan return from (Brazil) Internacional)

Out:

No.	Pos.	Nation	Player
8	MF	CHN	Ye Chugui (loan return to Guangzhou R&F)
10	FW	CMR	Franck Ohandza (to Henan Jianye)
17	MF	CHN	Abdunabi Aim (to Xi'an Daxing Chongde)
18	MF	CHN	Fei Yu (to Nantong Zhiyun)
20	MF	CHN	Xu Liang (Retired)
35	FW	GAM	Pa Dibba (loan to Shanghai Shenxin)
45	MF	CHN	Xie Mingqi (Released)
-	FW	BRA	Rossi (loan to (Brazil) Vasco da Gama)

=== Tianjin TEDA ===
In:

No.	Pos.	Nation	Player
9	FW	GER	Sandro Wagner (from (Germany) Bayern Munich)
13	DF	CHN	Zheng Kaimu (from Guizhou Hengfeng)
14	DF	CHN	Rong Hao (loan from Guangzhou Evergrande Taobao)
18	MF	CHN	Piao Taoyu (from Zhejiang Yiteng)
23	FW	CHN	Lei Yongchi (loan return from Liaoning)
30	DF	CHN	Liu Yang (from Beijing Renhe)
32	MF	CHN	Su Yuanjie (from Tianjin Tianhai)
42	DF	CHN	Xie Deshun (from Zhejiang Greentown)
46	FW	CHN	Han Zixuan (from Henan Jianye)
-	MF	CHN	Guo Yi (loan return from Meizhou Hakka)
-	MF	CHN	Wang Dong (loan return from Qingdao Huanghai)

Out:

No.	Pos.	Nation	Player
8	MF	CHN	Li Yuanyi (to Shenzhen F.C.)
10	MF	NGA	John Obi Mikel (to (England) Middlesbrough)
13	DF	CHN	Zhou Qiming (Released)
18	FW	CHN	Zhou Liao (loan to Yinchuan Helanshan)
41	GK	CHN	Wang Zelong (Released)
46	MF	CHN	Cheng Yuchi (Released)
47	MF	CHN	Wang Yiwen (to Sanya Qinghao)
51	DF	CHN	Yue Yanzhao (Released)
52	GK	CHN	Yuan Weihao (to Suzhou Dongwu)
56	DF	CHN	Li Yueyan (Released)
-	FW	NGA	Brown Ideye (Released)
-	FW	GAB	Malick Evouna (to (Portugal) Santa Clara)
-	MF	CHN	Guo Yi (to Meizhou Hakka)
-	MF	CHN	Wang Dong (to Qingdao Huanghai)
-	GK	CHN	Guo Jiawei (to Hubei Chufeng Heli)
-	MF	CHN	Fan Xuyang (to Hubei Chufeng Heli)

=== Tianjin Tianhai ===
In:

No.	Pos.	Nation	Player
5	DF	CHN	Zhang Chenglin (loan from Guangzhou Evergrande Taobao)
7	FW	BRA	Alan (loan from Guangzhou Evergrande Taobao)
8	MF	CHN	Yao Junsheng (loan from Shandong Luneng Taishan)
11	MF	BRA	Renatinho (loan from Guangzhou R&F)
12	DF	CHN	Yan Zihao (loan return from Jiangsu Yancheng Dingli)
15	DF	CHN	Wen Jiabao (loan from Guangzhou Evergrande Taobao)
17	MF	CHN	Zhang Xiaobin (loan from Jiangsu Suning)
20	MF	CHN	Zhang Yuan (loan return from Guizhou Hengfeng)
22	GK	CHN	Fang Jingqi (loan from Guangzhou South China Tiger)
26	MF	CHN	Liao Lisheng (loan from Guangzhou Evergrande Taobao)
-	DF	CHN	Yang Shanping (loan return from Dalian Yifang)
-	FW	BRA	Geuvânio (loan return from (Brazil) Flamengo)

Out:

No.	Pos.	Nation	Player
4	DF	CHN	Liu Yiming (to Guangzhou Evergrande Taobao)
7	MF	CHN	Zhao Xuri (to Dalian Yifang)
8	MF	CHN	Zhang Xiuwei (to Guangzhou Evergrande Taobao)
10	FW	BRA	Alexandre Pato (to (Brazil) São Paulo)
15	MF	CHN	Liu Yue (loan to Inner Mongolia Zhongyou)
17	MF	CHN	Su Yuanjie (to Tianjin TEDA)
24	GK	CHN	Yang Jun (Retired)
27	FW	FRA	Anthony Modeste (to (Germany) 1. FC Köln)
37	DF	CHN	Wu Lei (to Shandong Luneng)
42	DF	CHN	Bi Guangfu (to Dalian Yifang)
44	MF	CHN	Huang Long (to Xinjiang Tianshan Leopard)
45	MF	CHN	Sun Ze (to Guizhou Hengfeng)
50	MF	CHN	Pang Chuntao (to Dalian Yifang)
52	MF	CHN	Li Qinghao (to Dalian Yifang)
-	DF	CHN	Yang Shanping (to Dalian Yifang)
-	FW	BRA	Geuvânio (to (Brazil) Atlético Mineiro)

=== Wuhan Zall ===
In:

No.	Pos.	Nation	Player
3	DF	CHN	Liu Yi (from Beijing BSU)
5	DF	CHN	Han Pengfei (from Guizhou Hengfeng)
10	FW	BRA	Léo Baptistão (from (Spain) Espanyol)
16	GK	CHN	Dong Chunyu (from Beijing BSU)
21	MF	CHN	Jiang Zilei (from Shanghai SIPG)
22	DF	CHN	Liao Junjian (from Hebei China Fortune)
24	MF	CHN	Wang Kai (from Zhejiang Yiteng)
25	MF	CMR	Stéphane Mbia (from (France) Toulouse)
31	MF	CHN	Chen Ao (loan from Hebei China Fortune)
33	FW	CHN	Chang Feiya (loan from Guangzhou R&F)
40	FW	CHN	Guo Tianyu (loan from Shandong Luneng)
42	MF	CHN	Chen Yinjie (from Guizhou Hengfeng)
-	MF	CHN	Wang Xudong (loan return from Jilin Baijia)

Out:

No.	Pos.	Nation	Player
3	DF	CHN	Han Xuan (to Shaanxi Chang'an Athletic)
5	DF	CHN	Zhang Yaokun (Retired)
10	FW	BOL	Marcelo Moreno (to Shijiazhuang Ever Bright)
13	FW	CHN	Kang Zhenjie (loan to Jiangxi Liansheng)
22	DF	CHN	Liao Junjian (loan return to Hebei China Fortune)
29	DF	CHN	Ni Bo (to Shenzhen Bogang)
35	MF	CHN	Jiang Zilei (loan return to Shanghai SIPG)
37	FW	BRA	Pedro Júnior (loan return to (Japan) Kashima Antlers)
43	MF	CHN	Wu Jie (to Hubei Huachuang)
47	DF	CHN	Yi Xiaolong (Released)
-	DF	CHN	Ke Qi (to Yanbian Beiguo)

== League One ==
=== Beijing BSU ===
In:

No.	Pos.	Nation	Player
3	DF	CHN	Wang Jiong (loan from Shandong Luneng Taishan)
9	FW	BRA	Lins (from (Japan) FC Tokyo)
21	FW	CHN	Liang Xueming (from Guizhou Hengfeng)
23	DF	CHN	Chen Zepeng (loan from Guangzhou Evergrande Taobao)
25	GK	CHN	Jiang Hao (from Jiangsu Suning)
30	MF	CHN	Yao Xuchen (loan from Hebei China Fortune)
32	FW	CHN	Tian Yuda (loan from Shandong Luneng Taishan)
37	GK	CHN	Dong Hang (from Hunan Billows)
46	MF	CHN	Yao Shuo (from Qinhuangdao BSU)
47	MF	CHN	Han Xizheng (from Qinhuangdao BSU)
50	FW	CHN	Jia Yinbo (from Henan Jianye)
52	FW	CHN	Wu Xiaobo (from Henan Jianye)
53	GK	CHN	Liu kaixuan (from Qinhuangdao BSU)
56	DF	CHN	Qin Cheng (from Qinhuangdao BSU)
-	MF	CHN	Song Yi (loan return from Beijing BIT)
-	FW	CHN	Gong Zheng (loan return from Beijing BIT)

Out:

No.	Pos.	Nation	Player
1	GK	CHN	Wang Zixiang (loan return to (Spain) Granada CF)
3	DF	CHN	Liu Yi (to Wuhan Zall)
4	MF	CHN	Zhang Junzhe (to Hebei China Fortune)
14	DF	CHN	Gao Xin (loan return to Shandong Luneng)
16	MF	CHN	Yu Tao (Retired)
21	MF	CHN	Bu Xin (to Guangzhou South China Tiger)
23	MF	CHN	Fu Shang (to Qinhuangdao BSU)
28	MF	CHN	Song Yi (loan to Beijing BIT)
29	GK	CHN	Dong Chunyu (to Wuhan Zall)
33	DF	CHN	Liu Bin (Released)
39	GK	CHN	Li Yihe (to Qinhuangdao BSU)
46	MF	CHN	Liu Bo (to Lhasa Urban Construction Investment)
47	MF	CHN	Yan Zixu (to Qinhuangdao BSU)
50	MF	CHN	Zhao Fengxiang (to Qinhuangdao BSU)
52	DF	CHN	Jia Hongnian (loan to Beijing BIT)
53	MF	CHN	Sun Chaofan (to Xi'an UKD)
56	DF	CHN	Zhang Shengbin (to Hebei Aoli Jingying)
-	FW	CHN	Gong Zheng (loan to Suzhou Dongwu)

=== Changchun Yatai ===
In:

No.	Pos.	Nation	Player
3	DF	CHN	Ren Peng (from Zhejiang Yiteng)
6	DF	CHN	Li Xiaoming (from Shanghai Greenland Shenhua)
7	FW	BRA	Maurides (from (Bulgaria) CSKA Sofia)
8	FW	CHN	Sun Jun (from Yanbian Funde)
9	FW	NED	Richairo Zivkovic (from (Belgium) Oostende)
10	MF	ESP	José Jurado (from (Saudi Arabia) Al-Ahli)
13	FW	CHN	Yang Chaosheng (from Guangzhou Evergrande)
28	GK	CHN	Shi Xiaotian (from Liaoning F.C.)
35	DF	CHN	Xu Xiao (from Shanghai Greenland Shenhua)
44	MF	CHN	Yang Ailong (from (Portugal) Torreense)
55	MF	CHN	Li Shangwen (loan return from Sichuan Jiuniu)
-	MF	CHN	Ju Feng (loan from Guangzhou Evergrande)
-	MF	CHN	Wang Jinliang (loan return from Sichuan Jiuniu)

Out:

No.	Pos.	Nation	Player
8	MF	CHN	Du Zhenyu (Retired)
9	FW	NGA	Odion Ighalo (to Shanghai Greenland Shenhua)
10	FW	DEN	Lasse Vibe (to (Sweden) IFK Göteborg)
11	MF	POL	Adrian Mierzejewski (to Chongqing Dangdai Lifan)
15	DF	CHN	Sun Jie (loan to (Norway) Stabæk)
16	DF	CHN	Jiang Zhe (to Chongqing Dangdai Lifan)
21	MF	CHN	He Chao (to Guangzhou Evergrande Taobao)
38	MF	CHN	Wang Shouting (loan return to Shanghai Shenhua)
39	DF	SRB	Nemanja Pejčinović (Released)
45	MF	CHN	Wang Jinliang (loan to Jiangsu Yancheng Dingli)
55	DF	CHN	Zhang Wenjun (loan to Jiangsu Yancheng Dingli)

=== Guangdong Southern Tigers ===
In:

No.	Pos.	Nation	Player
4	DF	CHN	Zhao Yibo (from Dalian Transcendence)
10	FW	SRB	Alen Melunović (from Shijiazhuang Ever Bright)
11	MF	CHN	Bu Xin (from Beijing BSU)
13	MF	CHN	Liu Jianye (loan from Jiangsu Suning)
19	FW	GER	Richard Sukuta-Pasu (from (Germany) MSV Duisburg)
22	GK	CHN	Qiu Shengjiong (from Shanghai Greenland Shenhua)
26	DF	CHN	Liu Xing (from (Spain) Atlético Madrid)
28	MF	CHN	Deng Yubiao (loan from Guangzhou Evergrande Taobao)
33	DF	CHN	Wang Weibo (from Beijing Guoan)
57	DF	CHN	Zhong Zhigang (from Lhasa Urban Construction Investment)
58	GK	CHN	Chen Jiahao (from Hainan Boying)

Out:

No.	Pos.	Nation	Player
4	DF	ESP	Raúl Rodríguez (Released)
7	FW	BRA	Denilson (Released)
10	FW	BRA	Muriqui (to Shijiazhuang Ever Bright)
11	FW	CHN	Bai Tianci (loan return to Shandong Luneng)
13	DF	CHN	Li Weixin (to Shenzhen Bogang)
19	MF	CHN	He Jianfeng (to Baoding Yingli Yitong)
27	GK	CHN	Fang Jingqi (loan to Tianjin Tianhai)
28	MF	CHN	Huang Long (Retired)
34	MF	CHN	Luo Zetao (to Chengdu Better City)
-	GK	CHN	Yao Weilong (to Jiangxi Liansheng)

=== Guizhou Hengfeng ===
In:

No.	Pos.	Nation	Player
6	MF	CHN	Wang Shouting (from Shanghai Greenland Shenhua)
8	MF	BRA	Sérgio Mota (from Zhejiang Yiteng)
9	FW	CRO	Anton Maglica (from (Cyprus) Apollon Limassol)
13	DF	CHN	Wang Bin (Free agent)
24	MF	CHN	Liu Xuanchen (from Xinjiang Tianshan Leopard)
29	MF	CHN	Chen Ji (from Jiangsu Suning)
33	MF	CHN	Xue Chen (from Jiangsu Yancheng Dingli)
41	GK	CHN	Yang Zhen (from Yanbian Funde)
45	MF	CHN	Sun Ze (from Tianjin Tianhai)
46	MF	CHN	Jiang Lei (from Shanghai Greenland Shenhua)
47	MF	CHN	Jin Canri (from Yanbian Funde)
48	DF	CHN	Jiang Feng (from Yanbian Funde)
52	GK	CHN	Wu Daowen (from Yunnan Flying Tigers)
57	MF	CHN	Wang Yunlong (from Suzhou Dongwu)

Out:

No.	Pos.	Nation	Player
6	MF	CHN	Fan Yunlong (to Guangzhou R&F)
8	MF	CHN	Zhang Yuan (loan return to Tianjin Quanjian)
9	FW	GAM	Bubacarr Trawally (loan return to (Denmark) Vejle)
19	DF	CHN	Zheng Kaimu (to Tianjin TEDA)
22	FW	CHN	Liang Xueming (to Beijing BSU)
23	DF	CHN	Han Pengfei (to Wuhan Zall)
26	MF	ESP	Mario Suárez (to (Spain) Rayo Vallecano)
27	DF	CHN	Liu Hao (to Sichuan Longfor)
28	FW	CHN	Li Yingjian (to Shaanxi Chang'an Athletic)
29	MF	CHN	Chen Ji (loan return to Jiangsu Suning)
35	DF	CHN	Du Wei (Retired)
39	DF	CIV	Kévin Boli (loan to (Romania) CFR Cluj)
41	FW	CHN	Zheng Jing (Released)
47	MF	CHN	Chen Yinjie (to Wuhan Zall)
52	MF	CHN	Feng Yajun (to Guangxi Baoyun)
54	MF	CHN	Liang Weijie (to Shenzhen Bogang)
-	MF	CHN	Bu Wenhao (to Jiangsu Yancheng Dingli)

=== Heilongjiang Lava Spring ===
In:

No.	Pos.	Nation	Player
9	DF	CHN	Zhang Hao (from Shanghai Shenxin)
11	FW	CHN	Wang Ziming (loan return from Shenyang Urban)
18	FW	CHN	Fan Bojian (from Beijing Renhe)
23	GK	CHN	Xu Jiamin (loan from Beijing Renhe)
26	MF	CHN	Chen Liming (loan from Beijing Renhe)
27	FW	NGA	Daniel Chima Chukwu (loan from (Norway) Molde)
36	DF	CHN	Liu Xiangwei (loan from Beijing Renhe)
51	MF	CHN	Liu Weihan (Free agent)
53	DF	CHN	Che Jinhong (from (Portugal) G.D. Tourizense)
57	GK	CHN	Ci Henglong (from Beijing Renhe)
-	GK	CHN	Qian Wenlong (from Beijing Renhe)
-	DF	CHN	Guo Hongwei (from Beijing Renhe)
-	MF	CHN	Chen Zhichao (from Beijing Renhe)

Out:

No.	Pos.	Nation	Player
9	FW	SEN	Babacar Gueye (to Inner Mongolia Zhongyou)
16	FW	CHN	Wang Yida (loan to Guangxi Baoyun)
18	FW	CHN	Fan Bojian (loan return to Beijing Renhe)
22	GK	CHN	Mou Pengfei (to Beijing Renhe)
23	MF	CHN	Yang Feng (to Yingkou Chaoyue)
26	MF	CHN	Chen Liming (loan return to Beijing Renhe)
27	MF	CHN	Zhao Hongyang (Released)
37	FW	CHN	Yang Yihu (loan return to Beijing Renhe)
39	FW	BRA	Cassiano (to (Brazil) CSA)
50	MF	CHN	Jiang Yu (to Chongqing Dangdai Lifan)
57	MF	CHN	Cao Zhi (to Shenyang Urban)

=== Inner Mongolia Zhongyou ===
In:

No.	Pos.	Nation	Player
1	GK	CHN	Liu Weiguo (loan from Guangzhou Evergrande Taobao)
2	FW	CHN	Wang Jinze (loan from Guangzhou Evergrande Taobao)
6	MF	CHN	Xu Qing (from Xinjiang Tianshan Leopard)
9	MF	CHN	Liu Yue (loan from Tianjin Tianhai)
10	FW	SEN	Babacar Gueye (from Heilongjiang Lava Spring)
12	DF	CHN	Guo Jing (loan from Guangzhou Evergrande Taobao)
19	FW	NGA	John Owoeri (from Shanghai Shenxin)
23	MF	CHN	Yin Lu (from Dalian Transcendence)
26	DF	CHN	Zhang Chenliang (loan from Hebei Aoli Jingying)
51	DF	CHN	Yao Diran (from Dalian Transcendence)
52	GK	CHN	Sheng Peng (from Beijing Renhe)

Out:

No.	Pos.	Nation	Player
1	GK	CHN	Fang Zihong (loan return to Guangzhou Evergrande)
6	DF	CHN	Liu Ruicheng (loan return to Guangzhou Evergrande)
10	FW	BRA	Dori (to Meizhou Hakka)
19	MF	CHN	Luo Andong (to Shandong Luneng)
25	DF	CHN	Zhang Tianlong (to Liaoning F.C.)
35	MF	CHN	Zou Yucheng (to Zhejiang Greentown)
49	MF	CHN	Wang Haozhi (to Yunnan Kunlu)
57	DF	CHN	Wang Anping (to Chongqing Dangdai Lifan)

=== Liaoning F.C. ===
In:

No.	Pos.	Nation	Player
18	MF	CHN	Zheng Chunfeng (from Yanbian Funde)
31	MF	CHN	Xue Zhiwen (from Jiangsu Yancheng Dingli)
33	DF	CHN	Zhang Tianlong (from Inner Mongolia Zhongyou)
45	FW	CHN	Mao Jinpeng (from Shandong Luneng)
-	MF	CHN	Ma Haoran (loan return from Baoding Yingli Yitong)

Out:

No.	Pos.	Nation	Player
3	DF	CHN	Wu Gaojun (Retired)
5	DF	CHN	Yang Shuai (to Chongqing Dangdai Lifan)
9	FW	CHN	Feng Boyuan (to Jiangsu Suning)
21	DF	COD	Assani Lukimya (to (Germany) KFC Uerdingen)
23	FW	CHN	Lei Yongchi (loan return to Tianjin Teda)
26	DF	HKG	Andy Russell (to Hebei China Fortune)
28	GK	CHN	Shi Xiaotian (to Changchun Yatai)
32	MF	CHN	Ni Yusong (to Henan Jianye)
35	DF	CHN	Xiong Zhenfeng (loan to (Spain) Marbella)
61	MF	CHN	Yang Lianfeng (loan to Shanxi Metropolis)
-	MF	CHN	Ma Haoran (to Baoding Yingli Yitong)

=== Meizhou Hakka ===
In:

No.	Pos.	Nation	Player
5	DF	CHN	Hao Qiang (from Zhejiang Yiteng)
7	MF	CHN	Guo Yi (from Tianjin Teda)
8	DF	BRA	Chiquinho (from (Brazil) Coritiba)
9	FW	BRA	Dori (from Inner Mongolia Zhongyou)
10	MF	CHN	Cui Wei (from Shandong Luneng)
15	MF	CHN	Yang Bin (from Shenzhen Ledman)
16	DF	CHN	Liu Xiaolong (from Zhejiang Yiteng)
20	DF	CHN	Miao Ming (from Hunan Billows)
25	MF	CHN	Fan Jinrui (from (Portugal) Gondomar)
26	MF	CHN	Du Mingyang (from Beijing Sinobo Guoan)
28	DF	CHN	Xue Haoyuan (from (Portugal) F.C. Maia)
-	MF	CHN	Tan Jiajun (loan return from Shenzhen Pengcheng)
-	GK	CHN	Luo Zuqing (loan return from Shenzhen Pengcheng)

Out:

No.	Pos.	Nation	Player
3	DF	CHN	Wang Weilong (loan return to Shenzhen F.C.)
7	MF	CHN	Guo Yi (loan return to Tianjin Teda)
8	MF	CIV	Serges Déblé (to (Hong Kong) R&F)
9	MF	CHN	Chen Kerui (loan return to Shandong Luneng)
10	MF	CHN	Cui Wei (loan return to Shandong Luneng)
15	MF	NGA	Izunna Uzochukwu (to (Norway) Aalesunds)
21	MF	CHN	Tan Jiajun (to Shenzhen Pengcheng)
23	DF	CHN	Chen Jianlong (Released)
25	MF	CHN	Fan Jinrui (loan return to (Portugal) Gondomar)
32	DF	CHN	Wei Liping (to Shenzhen F.C.)
39	MF	CHN	Ouyang Xue (Released)
42	DF	CHN	Xiong Zexuan (loan to Shenzhen Pengcheng)
52	FW	CHN	Gao Zhilin (to Fujian Tianxin)
-	GK	CHN	Luo Zuqing (to Shenzhen Pengcheng)

=== Nantong Zhiyun ===
In:

No.	Pos.	Nation	Player
2	DF	CHN	Wei Lai (loan from Shanghai SIPG)
7	MF	CHN	Zheng Haoqian (from Shanghai SIPG)
8	MF	CHN	Fei Yu (from Shenzhen F.C.)
9	FW	CMR	Anatole Abang (from (United States) New York Red Bulls)
10	FW	CMR	Marius Obekop (from (Moldova) Zimbru Chișinău)
12	GK	CHN	Li Ya'nan (from Qingdao Huanghai)
18	FW	SRB	Mladen Kovačević (from (Serbia) Bečej 1918)
22	MF	CHN	Zhu Yifan (from Shenyang Urban)
28	FW	CHN	Gao Zhijie (from Shanghai SIPG)
33	MF	CHN	Sun Enming (loan from Shanghai SIPG)
42	FW	CHN	Cui Hongyu (from Guangzhou R&F)
47	DF	CHN	Gu Huajiang (from Jiangsu Suning)

Out:

No.	Pos.	Nation	Player
14	MF	CHN	Tan Binliang (loan return to Shenzhen)
18	DF	CHN	Ding Quancheng (to Guangxi Baoyun)
27	MF	CHN	Jin Wu (to Nanjing Fengfan)
28	FW	CHN	Gao Zhijie (Released)
29	FW	CHN	Zhang Wei (to Nanjing Fengfan)
33	FW	CHN	Zhu Zhengrong (loan return to Shanghai SIPG)

=== Qingdao Huanghai ===
In:

No.	Pos.	Nation	Player
2	DF	CHN	Jiang Weipeng (from Yanbian Funde)
5	MF	CHN	Zhang Jiaqi (loan from Guangzhou Evergrande Taobao)
6	MF	CHN	Wang Dong (from Tianjin Teda)
16	DF	CHN	Han Qingsong (from Yanbian Funde)
18	MF	CHN	Lu Haolin (from Guangzhou Evergrande Taobao)
19	MF	CHN	Zhuang Jiajie (from Hunan Billows)
28	GK	CHN	Li Zhizhao (from Guangzhou Evergrande)
34	FW	POR	Ricardo Vaz Tê (from Henan Jianye)
49	DF	CHN	Yu Bin (from Beijing Renhe)
50	DF	CHN	Wang Bingxiang (from Qingdao Jonoon)
52	DF	CHN	Sun Chengwei (from Beijing Sinobo Guoan)

Out:

No.	Pos.	Nation	Player
1	GK	CHN	Li Ya'nan (to Nantong Zhiyun)
3	MF	CHN	Zheng Zhiyun (loan return to Shanghai SIPG)
5	DF	CHN	Sun Guoliang (to Kunshan F.C.)
6	MF	CHN	Wang Dong (loan return to Tianjin Teda)
8	DF	CHN	Yang Yun (to Shijiazhuang Ever Bright)
21	FW	ESP	Francisco Sandaza (to (Spain) Alcorcón)
31	GK	CHN	Liu Peng (to Beijing Renhe)
66	FW	CHN	Zhang Zongzheng (to Qingdao Red Lions)
-	GK	CHN	Yan Zongyu (to Baoding Yingli Yitong)
-	DF	CHN	Luo Hao (to Qingdao Red Lions)

=== Shaanxi Chang'an Athletic ===
In:

No.	Pos.	Nation	Player
1	GK	CHN	Wang Qi (from Qingdao Jonoon)
3	DF	CHN	Han Xuan (from Wuhan Zall)
4	DF	ALB	Albi Alla (from (Albania) Flamurtari Vlorë)
8	FW	CHN	Li Yingjian (from Guizhou Hengfeng)
10	FW	COD	Oscar Taty Maritu (from Yanbian Funde)
15	FW	BRA	Guto (from Zhejiang Yiteng)
17	FW	CHN	Huang Pu (from Shandong Luneng)
26	FW	CHN	Mai Sijing (from Shenzhen Ledman)
35	DF	CHN	Ma Yangyang (from Beijing Renhe)
37	FW	CHN	Erpan Ezimjan (loan from Jiangsu Suning)
41	FW	CHN	Hong Mingyi (from Yanbian Funde)
45	MF	CHN	Leng Shiao (from Shanghai Greenland Shenhua)
46	MF	CHN	Fang Kuimin (from Yanbian Funde)
47	MF	CHN	Cui Qi (from Shanghai Greenland Shenhua)

Out:

No.	Pos.	Nation	Player
1	GK	CHN	Diao Zhibo (to Xi'an UKD)
4	DF	CHN	Zhao Peng (Retired)
12	MF	CHN	Gao Yan (to Yanbian Beiguo)
17	MF	CHN	Wu Jian (to Xi'an UKD)
21	DF	CHN	Wang Yiming (to Xi'an UKD)
28	FW	CHN	Wang Qi (to Xi'an UKD)

=== Shanghai Shenxin ===
In:

No.	Pos.	Nation	Player
2	DF	CHN	Cao Chuanyu (loan from Shanghai Shenhua)
5	MF	CHN	Liu Yingchen (loan from Dalian Yifang)
6	MF	CHN	Yuan Hao (loan from Dalian Yifang)
9	FW	GAM	Pa Dibba (loan from Shenzhen F.C.)
12	GK	CHN	Peng Peng (loan from Shanghai Shenhua)
16	MF	CHN	Xu Yue (loan from Shanghai Shenhua)
17	DF	CHN	Zhang Jiaxin (from (Portugal) Gafanha)
20	FW	CHN	Sun Xipeng (loan from Shanghai Shenhua)
22	MF	PER	Roberto Siucho (loan from Guangzhou Evergrande Taobao)
31	GK	CHN	Li Weijie (loan from Guangzhou Evergrande Taobao)
-	MF	CHN	Tan Fucheng (loan return from Suzhou Dongwu)

Out:

No.	Pos.	Nation	Player
3	DF	BRA	Johnny (Released)
5	MF	CHN	Wang Jiajie (loan return to Shanghai SIPG)
6	MF	CHN	Gu Bin (to Zhejiang Greentown)
9	FW	CHN	Wang Jingbin (loan return to Guangzhou Evergrande)
10	FW	BRA	Biro Biro (to (Brazil) São Paulo)
12	MF	CHN	Xia Ningning (Released)
16	MF	CHN	Shi Yiyi (to Shenzhen F.C.)
17	FW	CHN	Zhang Wentao (to Henan Jianye)
18	MF	CHN	Ye Chongqiu (to Jiangsu Suning)
19	MF	NGA	John Owoeri (to Inner Mongolia Zhongyou)
20	MF	CHN	Wu Yizhen (to Shanghai Greenland Shenhua)
22	GK	CHN	Lin Xiang (to Zibo Cuju)
23	DF	CHN	Zhang Hao (to Heilongjiang Lava Spring)
26	DF	CHN	Zhao Zuojun (Retired)
27	GK	CHN	Guo Wei (to Shenzhen F.C.)
33	DF	CHN	Wei Lai (loan return to Shanghai SIPG)
42	DF	CHN	Chen Xiaolei (to Yanbian Beiguo)
50	MF	CHN	Chen Wei (to Suzhou Dongwu)
52	MF	CHN	Li Lan (to Suzhou Dongwu)
56	DF	CHN	Hu Mingfei (to Suzhou Dongwu)
59	MF	CHN	Tan Fucheng (to Suzhou Dongwu)

=== Shijiazhuang Ever Bright ===
In:

No.	Pos.	Nation	Player
6	DF	CHN	Yang Yun (from Qingdao Huanghai)
7	MF	CHN	Zang Yifeng (from Zhejiang Greentown)
9	FW	BOL	Marcelo Moreno (from Wuhan Zall)
11	FW	BRA	Muriqui (from Guangzhou South China Tiger)
33	MF	CHN	Piao Shihao (from Yanbian Funde)
41	MF	CHN	Zheng Zhiyun (from Shanghai SIPG)
46	DF	CHN	Zhou Songtao (from Yanbian Funde)
49	DF	CHN	Zhang Hongkui (from Yanbian Funde)
52	FW	CHN	Li Xun (from Jilin Baijia)
-	MF	CHN	Meng Yang (loan return from Dalian Transcendence)

Out:

No.	Pos.	Nation	Player
7	MF	CHN	Sun Haosheng (to Zhejiang Greentown)
9	FW	SRB	Alen Melunović (to Guangzhou South China Tiger)
14	FW	VEN	Mario Rondón (to (Romania) Gaz Metan Mediaș)
15	MF	CHN	Wang Peng (to Shenzhen F.C.)
30	FW	COD	Junior Mapuku (to (Romania) Dunărea Călărași)
54	MF	CHN	Yang Guicheng (to Shenzhen F.C.)

=== Sichuan Longfor ===
In:

No.	Pos.	Nation	Player
3	DF	CHN	Ji Zhengyu (from Jiangsu Yancheng Dingli)
4	DF	SRB	Nikola Petković (Free agent)
6	FW	CHN	Duan Yunzi (from Dalian Yifang)
23	FW	BRA	Evandro (from (South Korea) FC Seoul)
24	MF	CHN	Zhang Jiajie (loan from Guangzhou R&F)
25	FW	NGA	Aaron Samuel (Free agent)
27	DF	CHN	Liu Hao (from Guizhou Hengfeng)
31	MF	CHN	He Linli (from (Spain) Fuenlabrada)
34	DF	CHN	Huang Chao (from Beijing Sinobo Guoan)
44	MF	CHN	Liu Yuhan (from Sichuan Jiuniu)
45	MF	CHN	Song Weipeng (from Sichuan Jiuniu)
57	MF	CHN	Wen Wubin (from Beijing Sinobo Guoan)

Out:

No.	Pos.	Nation	Player
6	FW	CHN	Duan Yunzi (loan return to Dalian Yifang)

=== Xinjiang Tianshan Leopard ===
In:

No.	Pos.	Nation	Player
4	DF	LVA	Ritus Krjauklis (from (Malaysia) PKNP)
5	FW	CHN	Mirza'ekber Almjan (Free agent)
7	FW	CHN	Shewket Yalqun (loan from Guangzhou Evergrande Taobao)
8	MF	CHN	Huang Long (from Tianjin Tianhai)
11	FW	BRA	Stefano Pinho (from (Thailand) PT Prachuap)
15	MF	CHN	Dilyimit Tudi (loan from Guangzhou Evergrande)
16	DF	CHN	Zhang Ao (from Hainan Boying)
17	MF	CHN	Ermek Talaphan (from Huizhou Huixin)
28	MF	CHN	Dilxat Ablimit (from Huizhou Huixin)
23	DF	CHN	Liu Ruicheng (loan from Guangzhou Evergrande Taobao)
40	DF	CHN	Diyar Hani (from Huizhou Huixin)
41	DF	CHN	Almas Azat (from Huizhou Huixin)
42	MF	CHN	Argin Kongelbek (from Huizhou Huixin)
46	DF	CHN	Liu Dongyang (Free agent)
52	MF	CHN	Hudaberdi Bekri (from Huizhou Huixin)
58	DF	CHN	Ilyas Ilhar (from Huizhou Huixin)

Out:

No.	Pos.	Nation	Player
3	DF	CHN	Cai Xi (to Dalian Chanjoy)
4	DF	CHN	Xia Jin (Released)
5	MF	CHN	Zhou Heng (to Wuhan Three Towns)
6	DF	CHN	Dilmurat Mawlanyaz (to Chongqing Dangdai Lifan)
7	MF	CHN	Liu Jiawei (loan return to Shanghai Shenhua)
8	MF	CHN	Wu Peng (Retired)
10	MF	VEN	Jacobo Kouffati (loan return to (Ecuador) Cuenca)
11	MF	CHN	Xu Qing (to Inner Mongolia Zhongyou)
13	MF	CHN	Qi Yunfei (to Wuhan Three Towns)
16	MF	CIV	Kobena Amed (Released)
20	DF	CHN	Song Xie (to Hubei Wuhan Athletics Zaiming)
23	DF	CHN	Zheng Yuxuan (Released)
24	MF	CHN	Baxtiyar Pezila (to Chongqing Dangdai Lifan)
31	FW	HKG	Paul Ngue (to Hong Kong Pegasus)
32	DF	CHN	Deng Biao (loan return to Shanghai Shenhua)
37	FW	ESP	José Antonio Reyes (to (Spain) Extremadura)
46	MF	CHN	Liu Xuanchen (to Guizhou Hengfeng)

=== Zhejiang Greentown ===
In:

No.	Pos.	Nation	Player
10	MF	CHN	Gu Bin (from Shanghai Shenxin)
20	MF	CHN	Wang Dongsheng (loan return from Fujian Tianxin)
21	MF	CHN	Cui Ren (from Yanbian Funde)
24	MF	ESP	Tana (loan from (Spain) Las Palmas)
30	GK	CHN	Lai Jinfeng (loan return from Fujian Tianxin)
31	GK	CHN	Deng Xiaofei (loan from Chongqing Dangdai Lifan)
33	DF	CHN	Wang Hongyou (from Dalian Transcendence)
35	MF	CHN	Zou Yucheng (from Inner Mongolia Zhongyou)
41	GK	CHN	Zhao Bo (from Baoding Yingli Yitong)
56	MF	CHN	Sun Haosheng (from Shijiazhuang Ever Bright)

Out:

No.	Pos.	Nation	Player
8	DF	CHN	Cheng Mouyi (Released)
10	MF	ESP	Edu García (to (India) ATK)
15	DF	CHN	Ye Churu (loan to Hangzhou Wuyue Qiantang)
23	GK	CHN	Zou Dehai (to Beijing Sinobo Guoan)
25	MF	CHN	Xu Yike (loan to Taizhou Yuanda)
29	MF	CHN	Li Xingcan (loan to Hangzhou Wuyue Qiantang)
31	FW	SRB	Đorđe Rakić (to (Croatia) NK Lokomotiva)
36	DF	CHN	Song Haiwang (to Henan Jianye)
41	MF	CHN	Luo Jing (to Jiangsu Suning)
42	MF	CHN	Zang Yifeng (to Shijiazhuang Ever Bright)
46	FW	CHN	He Jian (loan to Fujian Tianxin)
48	DF	CHN	Xie Deshun (to Tianjin TEDA)
56	FW	CHN	Shao Renzhe (loan to Fujian Tianxin)
59	MF	CHN	Shi Pengqing (loan to Fujian Tianxin)
64	MF	CHN	Guo Yongchu (loan to Hangzhou Wuyue Qiantang)
-	MF	CHN	Peng Zhengzheng (loan to Hangzhou Wuyue Qiantang)
