= Dequan =

- Gender: Male

Origin
- Region of origin: United States; China

Other names
- Variant forms: DaQuan, DeQuan, Da'Quan

Dequan or DeQuan is a masculine given name that can either be of English-language or Chinese origin. The English-language given name is often found among African Americans. Notable people with the given name include:

== English-language ==
- Dequan Finn (born 2001), American football player
- Mayhem Miller (drag queen) (real name Dequan Johnson; born 1982), American drag queen
- DaQuan Jones (born 1991), American football player
- DeQuan Jones (born 1990), American basketball player
- DaQuan Bracey (born 1997), American basketball player
- DaQuan Jeffries (born 1997), American basketball player
- Da'Quan Bowers (born 1990), American football player
- DeQuan Menzie (born 1990), American football player
- Daquan Neal, American politician
- Dequan Townsend (born 1986), American mixed martial artist
- FBG Duck (real name Carlton Dequan Weekly-Williams; 1993–2020), American rapper
- Chris Bey (first name Daquan, born 1996), American professional wrestler
- King Von (middle name Daquan, 1994–2020), American rapper

== Chinese (德全) ==
- Chen Dequan (陈德全; born 1995), Chinese short track speed skater
- He Dequan (何德全; born 1933), Chinese engineer
- Hong Daquan (洪大全), possibly mythical leader of the Taiping Rebellion
- Li Dequan (李德全; 1896–1972), Chinese government minister
- Yu Dequan (于德泉; 1932–2022), Chinese pharmaceutical chemist and academician
