= Zheng Zhiyun =

Zheng Zhiyun may refer to:

- Megan Zheng (born 1993), Singaporean actress & novelist
- Zheng Zhiyun (footballer) (born 1995), Chinese footballer
