= Wu Hang =

Chinese footballer

WOO HANG 吴航
Personal information
- Full name: Wu Hang
- Date of birth: 1 February 1993 (age 33)
- Place of birth: Cangnan, Zhejiang, China
- Height: 1.75 m (5 ft 9 in)
- Position: Full-back

Team information
- Current team: Wuxi Wugou

Youth career
- Hangzhou Greentown

Senior career*
Years	Team	Apps	(Gls)
2011	Wenzhou Provenza	19	(0)
2012–2014	Hangzhou Greentown	4	(0)
2015–2016	Baotou Nanjiao	17	(4)
2017–2020	Shanghai SIPG	0	(0)
2019	→ Jilin Baijia (loan)	31	(1)
2021	Xinjiang Tianshan Leopard	23	(0)
2022-	Wuxi Wugou	0	(0)
- * Club domestic league appearances and goals as of 29 April 2022

Wu Hang (Chinese: 吴航; pinyin: Wú Háng; born 1 February 1993 in Cangnan) is a Chinese footballer who currently plays for Wuxi Wugou in the China League Two.

== Club career ==
Wu started his professional football career in 2011 when he was sent to China League Two club Wenzhou Provenza (Hangzhou Greentown youth team) for the 2011 China League Two campaign. He was promoted to Hangzhou Greentown's first team squad by Takeshi Okada in 2012. On 7 April 2012, he made his Chinese Super League debut in the fifth match of the season which Hangzhou Greentown tied with Shanghai Shenhua 1–1, coming on as a substitute for Renatinho in the 79th minute. On 1 July 2015, Wu transferred to China League Two side Baotou Nanjiao.

In November 2016, Wu moved to Super League side Shanghai SIPG on a free transfer. He was sent to the SIPG reserved team in 2018. On 2 March 2019, Wu was loaned to China League Two side Jilin Baijia for the 2019 season. On his return to Shanghai SIPG he was sent to the reserves until he joined Xinjiang Tianshan Leopard on 13 April 2021.

== Career statistics ==
Statistics accurate as of match played 31 December 2020.

Appearances and goals by club, season and competition
Club	Season	League			National Cup		Continental		Other		Total	
Club	Season	Division	Apps	Goals	Apps	Goals	Apps	Goals	Apps	Goals	Apps	Goals
Wenzhou Provenza	2011	China League Two	19	0	-		-		-		19	0
Hangzhou Greentown	2012	Chinese Super League	2	0	2	0	-		-		4	0
Hangzhou Greentown	2013	Chinese Super League	0	0	1	0	-		-		1	0
Hangzhou Greentown	2014	Chinese Super League	2	0	0	0	-		-		2	0
Hangzhou Greentown	Total		4	0	3	0	0	0	0	0	7	0
Baotou Nanjiao	2015	China League Two	6	2	0	0	-		-		6	2
Baotou Nanjiao	2016	China League Two	17	4	1	0	-		-		18	4
Baotou Nanjiao	Total		23	6	1	0	0	0	0	0	24	6
Shanghai SIPG	2017	Chinese Super League	0	0	0	0	0	0	-		0	0
Jilin Baijia (loan)	2019	China League Two	31	1	1	0	-		-		32	1
Career total			77	7	5	0	0	0	0	0	82	7
