= Dilmurat =

Dilmurat is a Uyghur name that may refer to the following notable people:

- Dilmurat Mawlanyaz (born 1998), Chinese footballer of Uyghur ethnicity
- Dilraba Dilmurat (born 1992), Chinese actress, singer and model of Uyghur ethnicity
