= Wang Jiong =

Wang Jiong is the name of:

- Wang Jiong (politician) (born 1964), Chinese politician
- Wang Jiong (footballer) (born 1994), Chinese association footballer
