= Li Zhongyi (footballer) =

Chinese association football player

Personal information
- Date of birth: 14 April 1997 (age 29)
- Place of birth: Suihua, Heilongjiang, China
- Height: 1.86 m (6 ft 1 in)
- Position: Midfielder

Team information
- Current team: Shijiazhuang Gongfu
- Number: 27

Youth career
- 2014–2019: Guangzhou Evergrande

Senior career*
Years	Team	Apps	(Gls)
2019–2020	Zibo Cuju	13	(1)
2021	Inner Mongolia Caoshangfei	16	(1)
2022–	Shijiazhuang Gongfu	3	(0)

International career
- China U22
- * Club domestic league appearances and goals as of 24 December 2022

Li Zhongyi (Chinese: 李仲一; born 14 April 1997) is a Chinese footballer currently playing as a midfielder for Shijiazhuang Gongfu.

== Club career ==
Shortly after joining Guangzhou Evergrande in 2014, he was named in English newspaper The Guardian as one of the most promising young footballers born in 1997. Following a collapsed loan move to Wuhan Zall in 2018, Li sued Guangzhou Evergrande.

He left Guangzhou Evergrande after six years, in 2019, and signed with China League Two side Zibo Cuju. In 2020, he went on trial with Chinese Super League side Qingdao Huanghai, but ultimately would remain with Zibo Cuju for the 2020 season.

In 2022, following one season with the club, it was announced that Li had left Inner Mongolia Caoshangfei. He joined Shijiazhuang Gongfu, and made three appearances in the China League One in the 2022 season.

== International career ==
Li has been called up to the China under-22 side.

== Career statistics ==
=== Club ===
As of 24 December 2022.

Club	Season	League			Cup		Continental		Other		Total	
Club	Season	Division	Apps	Goals	Apps	Goals	Apps	Goals	Apps	Goals	Apps	Goals
Zibo Cuju	2019	China League Two	7	1	0	0	–		1 (Note: Appearances in the China League Two playoffs)	0	8	1
Zibo Cuju	2020	China League Two	4	0	0	0	–		1	0	5	0
Zibo Cuju	Total		11	1	0	0	0	0	2	0	13	1
Inner Mongolia Caoshangfei	2021	China League Two	16	1	1 (Note: Appearances in the Chinese FA Cup)	0	–		0	0	17	1
Shijiazhuang Gongfu	2022	China League One	3	0	1	0	–		0	0	4	0
Career total			30	2	2	0	0	0	2	0	34	2
