= Cui Wei (footballer, born 1994) =

Chinese footballer

Cui Wei 崔巍
Personal information
- Full name: Cui Wei
- Date of birth: 16 August 1994 (age 32)
- Place of birth: Zibo, Shandong, China
- Height: 1.78 m (5 ft 10 in)
- Position: Midfielder

Team information
- Current team: Xiamen Feilu
- Number: 23

Youth career
- Shandong Luneng

Senior career*
Years	Team	Apps	(Gls)
2011–2012	Shandong Youth	15	(3)
2013–2014	→ Loures (loan)	10	(1)
2015–2018	Shandong Luneng	7	(0)
2018	→ Meizhou Hakka (loan)	26	(2)
2019–2024	Meizhou Hakka	87	(9)
2024	→Ganzhou Ruishi (loan)	12	(2)
2024	→Guangdong GZ-Power (loan)	4	(0)
2025	Guangdong GZ-Power	0	(0)
2026–	Xiamen Feilu	13	(2)
- * Club domestic league appearances and goals as of 31 December 2022

Cui Wei (Chinese: 崔巍; pinyin: Cuī Wēi; born 16 August 1994) is a Chinese footballer who currently plays as a midfielder for Xiamen Feilu.

== Club career ==
Cui Wei started his football career when he played for China League Two side Shandong Youth in 2011 and 2012. In August 2013, he was loaned to Campeonato de Portugal side Loures for one season. Cui was promoted to Shandong Luneng's first team squad by Cuca in the 2015 season. On 4 May 2016, he made his debut for Shandong in the last group match of 2016 AFC Champions League against Buriram United with a 0–0 away draw, coming on as a substitution for Zhang Wenzhao in the 76th minute. Cui made his Super League debut on 4 March 2017 in a 2–0 home victory against Tianjin Teda as the benefit of the new rule of the Super League that at least one Under-23 player must in the starting. On 2 May 2017, he scored his first senior goal for the club in the 2017 Chinese FA Cup as Shandong Luneng beat League Two club Jilin Baijia 4–1.

On 28 February 2018, Cui was loaned to China League One club Meizhou Hakka and would go on to make his debut in a league game on 18 March 2018 against Yanbian Funde in a 1–0 victory. He made a permanent transfer to Meizhou Hakka on 2 February 2019. He would then go on to be a vital member of the team that gained promotion to the top tier after coming second within the division at the end of the 2021 China League One campaign.

== Career statistics ==
Statistics accurate as of match played 31 December 2022.

Club	Season	League			National Cup		Continental		Other		Total	
Club	Season	Division	Apps	Goals	Apps	Goals	Apps	Goals	Apps	Goals	Apps	Goals
Shandong Youth	2011	China League Two	3	0	-		-		-		3	0
Shandong Youth	2012	China League Two	12	3	1	0	-		-		13	3
Shandong Youth	Total		15	3	1	0	0	0	0	0	16	3
Loures (loan)	2013–14	Campeonato de Portugal	10	1	1	0	-		-		11	1
Shandong Luneng Taishan	2015	Chinese Super League	0	0	0	0	0	0	0 (Note: Appearances in Chinese FA Super Cup)	0	0	0
Shandong Luneng Taishan	2016	Chinese Super League	0	0	0	0	1	0	-		1	0
Shandong Luneng Taishan	2017	Chinese Super League	7	0	2	1	-		-		9	1
Shandong Luneng Taishan	Total		7	0	2	1	1	0	0	0	10	1
Meizhou Hakka (loan)	2018	China League One	26	2	0	0	-		-		26	2
Meizhou Hakka	2019	China League One	27	1	0	0	-		-		27	1
Meizhou Hakka	2020	China League One	11	0	1	0	-		-		12	0
Meizhou Hakka	2021	China League One	33	6	0	0	-		-		33	6
Meizhou Hakka	2022	Chinese Super League	16	2	1	0	-		-		17	2
Meizhou Hakka	Total		87	9	2	0	0	0	0	0	89	2
Career total			145	15	6	1	1	0	0	0	152	16
