= Cui Qi (footballer, born 1993) =

Chinese footballer

Personal information
- Date of birth: 26 February 1993 (age 33)
- Place of birth: Zhoukou, Henan, China
- Height: 1.81 m (5 ft 11 in)
- Position: Defender

Youth career
- –2012: Chongqing FC

Senior career*
Years	Team	Apps	(Gls)
2013	Guizhou Zhicheng		
2014–2018	Shanghai Shenhua	0	(0)
2015–2016	→ Atlético Museros (loan)	3	(0)
2015–2016	→ CF Cracks (loan)		
2018	→ Baotou Nanjiao (loan)	9	(0)
2019–2020	Shaanxi Chang'an Athletic	0	(0)
2020–2021	Inner Mongolia Caoshangfei	22	(0)
2022	Zibo Qisheng	6	(0)
2023	Shaoxing Shangyu Pterosaur	12	(0)
- * Club domestic league appearances and goals as of 14:01, 6 May 2022 (UTC)

Cui Qi (Chinese: 崔棋; born 26 February 1993) is a Chinese footballer currently playing as a defender.

== Club career ==
In 2018, Cui was loaned to China League Two side Baotou Nanjiao. He returned to the club, under the new name Inner Mongolia Caoshangfei, on a permanent basis in 2020.

== Career statistics ==
=== Club ===
As of 8 February 2022.

Club	Season	League			Cup		Other		Total	
Club	Season	Division	Apps	Goals	Apps	Goals	Apps	Goals	Apps	Goals
Shanghai Shenhua	2014	Chinese Super League	0	0	0	0	0	0	0	0
Shanghai Shenhua	2015	Chinese Super League	0	0	0	0	0	0	0	0
Shanghai Shenhua	2016	Chinese Super League	0	0	0	0	0	0	0	0
Shanghai Shenhua	2017	Chinese Super League	0	0	0	0	0	0	0	0
Shanghai Shenhua	2018	Chinese Super League	0	0	0	0	0	0	0	0
Shanghai Shenhua	Total		0	0	0	0	0	0	0	0
Atlético Museros (loan)	2015–2016	Preferente Valenciana	3	0	0	0	0	0	3	0
Baotou Nanjiao (loan)	2018	China League Two	9	0	0	0	0	0	9	0
Shaanxi Chang'an Athletic	2019	China League One	0	0	0	0	0	0	0	0
Shaanxi Chang'an Athletic	2020	China League One	0	0	0	0	0	0	0	0
Shaanxi Chang'an Athletic	Total		0	0	0	0	0	0	0	0
Inner Mongolia Caoshangfei	2020	China League Two	8	0	0	0	0	0	8	0
Inner Mongolia Caoshangfei	2021	China League Two	14	0	0	0	0	0	14	0
Inner Mongolia Caoshangfei	2022	China League Two	0	0	0	0	0	0	0	0
Inner Mongolia Caoshangfei	Total		22	0	0	0	0	0	22	0
Career total			12	0	0	0	2	0	14	0
