= Yan Ge (footballer) =

Chinese association football player

Personal information
- Date of birth: 28 January 1994 (age 32)
- Height: 1.76 m (5 ft 9 in)
- Position: Midfielder

Team information
- Current team: Hefei City

Youth career
- –2013: Shandong FA
- 2013–2018: Shanghai Shenhua

Senior career*
| Years | Team | Apps | (Gls) |
| 2018 | Shanghai Shenhua | 0 | (0) |
| 2018 | → Inner Mongolia Caoshangfei (loan) | 10 | (1) |
| 2019–2022 | Jiangxi Beidamen | 37 | (1) |
| 2022- | Hefei City | 0 | (0) |
- * Club domestic league appearances and goals as of 14:01, 20 April 2022 (UTC)

Yan Ge (Chinese: 阎格; born 28 January 1994) is a Chinese footballer currently playing as a midfielder for Hefei City.

== Career statistics ==
=== Club ===
As of 24 August 2021.

| Club | Season | League | | | Cup | | Other | | Total | |
| Club | Season | Division | Apps | Goals | Apps | Goals | Apps | Goals | Apps | Goals |
|---|---|---|---|---|---|---|---|---|---|---|
| Shanghai Shenhua | 2018 | Chinese Super League | 0 | 0 | 0 | 0 | 0 | 0 | 0 | 0 |
| Inner Mongolia Caoshangfei (loan) | 2018 | China League Two | 10 | 1 | 0 | 0 | 0 | 0 | 10 | 1 |
| Jiangxi Beidamen | 2019 | China League Two | 17 | 1 | 2 (Note: Appearances in the Chinese FA Cup) | 0 | 3 (Note: Appearances in the China League Two playoffs) | 0 | 22 | 1 |
| Jiangxi Beidamen | 2020 | China League One | 8 | 0 | 0 | 0 | 0 | 0 | 8 | 0 |
| Jiangxi Beidamen | 2021 | China League One | 9 | 0 | 1 | 0 | 0 | 0 | 10 | 0 |
| Jiangxi Beidamen | Total | | 34 | 1 | 3 | 0 | 3 | 0 | 40 | 1 |
| Career total | | | 44 | 2 | 3 | 0 | 3 | 0 | 50 | 2 |
