= Zhang Yuhao =

Chinese association football player

Personal information
- Date of birth: 29 January 1997 (age 29)
- Place of birth: Shenyang, Liaoning, China
- Height: 1.77 m (5 ft 10 in)
- Position: Midfielder

Team information
- Current team: Racing Rioja
- Number: 7

Youth career
- Shanghai Shenhua
- 2015–2016: → Atlético Museros (youth loan)
- 2015–2016: → CF Cracks (youth loan)

Senior career*
Years	Team	Apps	(Gls)
2018	Shanghai Shenhua	0	(0)
2018	→ Baotou Nanjiao (loan)	24	(0)
2019–2020	Dalian Professional	0	(0)
2021–2022	Costa Brava	1	(0)
2022–	Racing Rioja	8	(0)
- * Club domestic league appearances and goals as of 17:14, 6 June 2023 (UTC)

Zhang Yuhao (Chinese: 张雨浩; born 29 January 1997) is a Chinese footballer who plays as a midfielder for Spanish side Racing Rioja.

== Early life ==
Zhang was born in Shenyang, Liaoning.

== Club career ==
Having progressed through the Shanghai Shenhua academy, Zhang was sent on loan to both of Shanghai Shenhua's Spanish affiliate clubs Atlético Museros and CF Cracks in 2015–16. He spent time on loan with Baotou Nanjiao in 2018, playing in the China League Two. In 2019, having left Shanghai Shenhua, he joined Dalian Professional, spending two seasons with the club's reserve team.

In November 2021, Zhang signed for Spanish side Costa Brava. After a season with Costa Brava, in which he made one appearance in the Primera División RFEF, Zhang joined Racing Rioja in July 2022.

== Career statistics ==
=== Club ===
As of 6 June 2023.

Appearances and goals by club, season and competition
Club	Season	League			Cup		Other		Total	
Club	Season	Division	Apps	Goals	Apps	Goals	Apps	Goals	Apps	Goals
Shanghai Shenhua	2018	Chinese Super League	0	0	0	0	0	0	0	0
Baotou Nanjiao (loan)	2018	China League Two	24	0	0	0	0	0	24	0
Dalian Professional	2019	Chinese Super League	0	0	0	0	0	0	0	0
Dalian Professional	2020	Chinese Super League	0	0	0	0	0	0	0	0
Dalian Professional	Total		0	0	0	0	0	0	0	0
Costa Brava	2021–22	Primera División RFEF	1	0	0	0	0	0	1	0
Racing Rioja	2022–23	Segunda Federación	8	0	1 (Note: Appearances in the Copa del Rey)	0	0	0	9	0
Career total			33	0	1	0	0	0	34	0
