= Li Xun (footballer) =

Chinese footballer

Li Xun 리훈 李勋
Personal information
- Date of birth: 2 January 1992 (age 34)
- Place of birth: Tumen, Jilin, China
- Height: 1.77 m (5 ft 10 in)
- Positions: Forward; attacking midfielder

Team information
- Current team: Cangzhou Mighty Lions

Senior career*
Years	Team	Apps	(Gls)
2013–2017	Yanbian FC	83	(7)
2018	Jilin Baijia	13	(1)
2019–	Cangzhou Mighty Lions	0	(0)
- * Club domestic league appearances and goals as of 31 January 2023

Li Xun
- Simplified Chinese: 李勋
Transcriptions
Standard Mandarin
- Hanyu Pinyin: Lǐ Xūn
- IPA: [lì ɕýn]

Chinese Korean name
- Chosŏn'gŭl: 리훈
Transcriptions
- Revised Romanization: Ri Hun
- McCune–Reischauer: Ri Hun

Li Xun (Chinese: 李勋; Korean: 리훈; born 2 January 1992) is a Chinese professional footballer who currently plays for as a forward or attacking midfielder for Cangzhou Mighty Lions.

== Club career ==
Li Xun started his professional football career in 2013 when he was promoted to China League One side Yanbian FC's first team squad. He quickly established himself within the first team and became a regular starter in the season. On 18 August 2013, he scored his first senior goal in a 3–1 defeat against Shenyang Shenbei. He played 22 league matches and scored 2 goals in the 2015 season as Yanbian won promotion to the Chinese Super League. On 19 February 2016, after an unsuccessful trial with Beijing Guoan, he signed a new contract with Yanbian. On 5 March 2016, Li made his Super League debut in the first match of 2016 season against Shanghai Shenhua, coming on as a substitute for Yoon Bit-garam in the 91st minute in a game that ended in a 1–1 draw.

Despite being an integral member of the squad that helped maintain Yanbian's status within the top tier throughout the 2016 Chinese Super League season, Li was unceremoniously dropped to the teams bench throughout the whole of the 2017 Chinese Super League and saw Yanbian relegated at the end of the season. Speculation within the Chinese media suggested that the owners were unhappy with how Li's contract negotiations went and that he was actively looking to move. In March 2018, Li transferred to China League Two side Jilin Baijia. On 28 February 2019, Li joined second-tier club Shijiazhuang Ever Bright (now known as Cangzhou Mighty Lions) and was placed in their reserve squad.

== Career statistics ==
Statistics accurate as of match played 31 January 2023.

Appearances and goals by club, season and competition
Club	Season	League			National Cup		Continental		Other		Total	
Club	Season	Division	Apps	Goals	Apps	Goals	Apps	Goals	Apps	Goals	Apps	Goals
Yanbian FC	2013	China League One	24	2	0	0	-		-		24	2
Yanbian FC	2014	China League One	20	3	1	0	-		-		21	3
Yanbian FC	2015	China League One	22	2	0	0	-		-		22	2
Yanbian FC	2016	Chinese Super League	17	0	1	0	-		-		18	0
Yanbian FC	2017	Chinese Super League	0	0	0	0	-		-		0	0
Yanbian FC	Total		83	7	2	0	0	0	0	0	85	7
Jilin Baijia	2018	China League Two	13	1	2	1	-		-		15	2
Career total			96	8	4	1	0	0	0	0	100	9

== Honours ==
=== Club ===
Yanbian FC

- China League One: 2015
