= Wei Lai =

Chinese footballer (born 1997)

Personal information
- Date of birth: 2 January 1997 (age 29)
- Place of birth: Lu'an, Anhui, China
- Height: 1.78 m (5 ft 10 in)
- Position: Full-back

Team information
- Current team: Lanzhou Longyuan Athletic

Youth career
- –2018: Shanghai Port

Senior career*
Years	Team	Apps	(Gls)
2018–2021	Shanghai Port	0	(0)
2018	→ Shanghai Shenxin (loan)	13	(1)
2019–2020	→ Nantong Zhiyun (loan)	41	(1)
2021	→ Kunshan FC (loan)	12	(0)
2022–2024	Nantong Zhiyun	45	(2)
2025–2026	Dalian Kun City	12	(0)
2026–	Lanzhou Longyuan Athletic	0	(0)

International career^{‡}
2018	China U21		
- * Club domestic league appearances and goals as of 11:18, 8 March 2026 (UTC) ‡ National team caps and goals as of 14:01, 28 July 2021 (UTC)

Wei Lai (Chinese: 魏来; born 2 January 1997) is a Chinese footballer currently playing as a full-back for China League Two club Lanzhou Longyuan Athletic.

== Club career ==
Wei Lai played for the Shanghai Port youth team before being promoted to their senior team in the 2018 league season and then loaned out to the neighbouring second tier club Shanghai Shenxin on 14 September 2018. His loan period saw him go on to make his senior debut in a league game against Shenzhen in a 3-1 defeat. This was followed by his first goal, which was in a league game against Zhejiang Greentown on 10 August 2018 that ended in a 3-1 defeat.

During the following campaigns, he was loaned out to second tier clubs Nantong Zhiyun and Kunshan before he permanently transferred to Nantong on 18 April 2022. He went on to establish himself within the team and helped the club to gain promotion to the top tier at the end of the 2022 China League One season.

== Personal life ==
Wei Lai is the paternal cousin of fellow footballer Wei Zhen.

== Career statistics ==
As of 31 December 2022.

Club	Season	League			Cup		Continental		Other		Total	
Club	Season	Division	Apps	Goals	Apps	Goals	Apps	Goals	Apps	Goals	Apps	Goals
Shanghai Port	2018	Chinese Super League	0	0	0	0	0	0	–		0	0
Shanghai Port	2019	Chinese Super League	0	0	0	0	0	0	0 (Note: Appearances in Chinese FA Super Cup)	0	0	0
Shanghai Port	2020	Chinese Super League	0	0	1	0	0	0	–		1	0
Shanghai Port	2021	Chinese Super League	0	0	0	0	1 (Note: Appearances in AFC Champions League qualification)	0	–		0	0
Shanghai Port	Total		0	0	1	0	1	0	0	0	2	0
Shanghai Shenxin (loan)	2018	China League One	13	1	0	0	–		–		13	1
Nantong Zhiyun (loan)	2019	China League One	26	1	1	0	–		–		27	1
Nantong Zhiyun (loan)	2020	China League One	15	0	0	0	–		–		15	0
Nantong Zhiyun (loan)	Total		42	1	1	0	0	0	0	0	43	1
Kunshan FC (loan)	2021	China League One	12	0	2	0	–		–		14	0
Nantong Zhiyun	2022	China League One	25	2	0	0	–		–		25	2
Career total			80	4	2	0	1	0	0	0	83	4
