= Yu Dequan =

Chinese medicinal chemist (1932–2022)

- 于德泉
- Born: 22 October 1932; Penglai County, Shandong, China
- Died: 31 December 2022 (aged 90); Beijing, China
- Education: Peking University Health Science Center
- Scientific career
- Fields: Natural pharmaceutical chemistry
- Workplaces: Institute of Materia Medica, Chinese Academy of Medical Sciences

Yu Dequan (Chinese: 于德泉; pinyin: Yú Déquán; 22 October 1932 – 31 December 2022) was a Chinese pharmaceutical chemist, and an academician of the Chinese Academy of Engineering.

== Biography ==
Yu was born into a family of farming background in Penglai County (now Penglai District), Shandong, on 22 October 1932.

In 1947, he became a worker at the Xinhua Pharmaceutical Factory under the Department of Health of Jiaodong Military Region. In 1952, he was accepted to Beijing Medical College (now Peking University Health Science Center), where he majored in pharmaceutical chemistry. After graduating in 1956, he was despatched to the Institute of Materia Medica, Chinese Academy of Medical Sciences. Between 1980 and 1981, he studied at the Institute of Natural Material Chemistry, French Academy of Sciences.

On 31 December 2022, he died in Beijing, at the age of 90.

== Honours and awards ==
- 1999 Member of the Chinese Academy of Engineering (CAE)
- 2019 Member of the Chinese Academy of Medical Sciences (CAMS)
