= Yu Bin (footballer) =

Chinese footballer

Yu Bin 于斌
Personal information
- Date of birth: 6 December 1995 (age 30)
- Place of birth: Yantai, Shandong, China
- Height: 1.78 m (5 ft 10 in)
- Position: Full back

Team information
- Current team: Guangxi Yong City

Youth career
- 2001–2006: Yantai Juvenile
- 2007–2008: Shandong Luneng
- 2009–2015: Guizhou Renhe

Senior career*
Years	Team	Apps	(Gls)
2016–2018	Beijing Renhe	17	(0)
2019–2020	Qingdao Huanghai	0	(0)
2020	Wuxi Wugou		
2021	Tai'an Huawei		
2022-	Guangxi Yong City	0	(0)
- * Club domestic league appearances and goals as of 18 May 2022

Yu Bin (Chinese: 于斌; pinyin: Yú Bīn; born 6 December 1995) is a Chinese footballer who currently plays as a full back for Chinese club Guangxi Yong City.

== Club career ==
Yu Bin started his professional football career in 2016 when he was promoted to China League One club Guizhou Renhe's first team squad. He made his senior debut on 11 May 2015, playing the whole 90 minute in a 1–0 home loss to Shijiazhuang Ever Bright in the 2016 Chinese FA Cup. On 15 July 2017, he made his league debut in a 1–0 away win over Yunnan Lijiang. He went on to make 10 appearances in the 2017 season as Beijing Renhe finished second place in the League One and won promotion back to the Chinese Super League. On 14 April 2018, he made his Super League debut in a 2–1 home win against Guizhou Hengfeng, coming on as a substitute for Cao Yongjing in the 65th minute.

Jiang transferred to China League One side Qingdao Huanghai in February 2019.

== Career statistics ==
As of 31 December 2020.

Appearances and goals by club, season and competition
Club	Season	League			National Cup		Continental		Other		Total	
Club	Season	Division	Apps	Goals	Apps	Goals	Apps	Goals	Apps	Goals	Apps	Goals
Beijing Renhe	2016	China League One	0	0	1	0	-		-		1	0
Beijing Renhe	2017	China League One	10	0	2	0	-		-		12	0
Beijing Renhe	2018	Chinese Super League	9	0	2	0	-		-		11	0
Beijing Renhe	Total		19	0	5	0	0	0	0	0	24	0
Career total			19	0	5	0	0	0	0	0	24	0
