= Baxtiyar Pezila =

Chinese association football player

Personal information
- Date of birth: 17 November 1998 (age 27)
- Place of birth: Kashgar, Xinjiang, China
- Height: 1.79 m (5 ft 10 in)
- Position: Midfielder

Team information
- Current team: Dalian Huayi
- Number: 31

Senior career*
Years	Team	Apps	(Gls)
2018–2019	Xinjiang Tianshan Leopard	23	(2)
2019–2022	Chongqing Liangjiang Athletic	12	(0)
2020–2021	→ Recreativo Granada (loan)	0	(0)
2022–2023	Liaoning Shenyang Urban	18	(0)
2023–	Dalian Huayi		
- * Club domestic league appearances and goals as of 01:48, 10 January 2024 (UTC)

Baxtiyar Pezila (Chinese: 白合提亚尔·排孜拉; pinyin: Báihétíyà'ěr Páizīlā; born 17 November 1998) is a Chinese footballer who plays as a midfielder for Dalian Huayi.

== Club career ==
Baxtiyar Pezila was promoted to the senior team of Xinjiang Tianshan Leopard within the 2018 China League One season and would make his debut in a league game on 10 March 2018 against Liaoning F.C. in a 2-0 defeat. After the game he would quickly establish himself as a regular within the team and go on to make 23 appearances for the club. On 21 February 2019 he would sign for top tier club Chongqing Lifan. On 4 February 2020 he was loaned out to Recreativo Granada.

== Career statistics ==
As of 28 April 2021.

Club	Season	League			Cup		Continental		Other		Total	
Club	Season	Division	Apps	Goals	Apps	Goals	Apps	Goals	Apps	Goals	Apps	Goals
Xinjiang Tianshan Leopard	2018	China League One	23	2	0	0	–		0	0	23	2
Chongqing Lifan/Chongqing Liangjiang	2019	Chinese Super League	0	0	1 (Note: Appearances in the Chinese FA Cup)	0	0	0	0	0	1	0
Chongqing Lifan/Chongqing Liangjiang	2020	Chinese Super League	0	0	0	0	0	0	0	0	0	0
Chongqing Lifan/Chongqing Liangjiang	2021	Chinese Super League	1	0	0	0	0	0	0	0	1	0
Chongqing Lifan/Chongqing Liangjiang	Total		1	0	1	0	0	0	0	0	2	0
Recreativo Granada (loan)	2020–21	Segunda División B	0	0	0	0	–		0	0	0	0
Career total			24	2	1	0	0	0	0	0	25	2
