= Li Zhizhao =

Chinese association football player (born 1999)

Personal information
- Date of birth: 6 August 1999 (age 27)
- Place of birth: Guangzhou, Guangdong, China
- Height: 1.88 m (6 ft 2 in)
- Position: Goalkeeper

Team information
- Current team: Guizhou Guiyang Athletic
- Number: 1

Youth career
- –2018: Guangzhou Evergrande

Senior career*
Years	Team	Apps	(Gls)
2019–2021	Qingdao FC	8	(0)
2022	Chongqing Liangjiang	0	(0)
2022	Nantong Zhiyun	0	(0)
2022–2024	Shenzhen Peng City	8	(0)
2025	Wuxi Wugou	0	(0)
2026–	Guizhou Guiyang Athletic	0	(0)
- * Club domestic league appearances and goals as of 21:01, 27 April 2022 (UTC)

Li Zhizhao (Chinese: 李智钊; born 6 August 1999) is a Chinese footballer who plays as a goalkeeper for Guizhou Guiyang Athletic.

== Career statistics ==
=== Club ===
As of 28 October 2023.

Club	Season	League			Cup		Other		Total	
Club	Season	Division	Apps	Goals	Apps	Goals	Apps	Goals	Apps	Goals
Qingdao FC	2019	China League One	1	0	1 (Note: Appearances in the Chinese FA Cup)	0	–		2	0
Qingdao FC	2020	Chinese Super League	0	0	0	0	0	0	0	0
Qingdao FC	2021	Chinese Super League	7	0	1	0	–		8	0
Qingdao FC	Total		8	0	2	0	0	0	10	0
Nantong Zhiyun	2022	China League One	0	0	1	0	–		1	0
Sichuan Jiuniu/ Shenzhen Peng City	2022	China League One	4	0	0	0	–		4	0
Sichuan Jiuniu/ Shenzhen Peng City	2023	China League One	3	0	2	0	–		5	0
Sichuan Jiuniu/ Shenzhen Peng City	Total		7	0	2	0	0	0	9	0
Career total			15	0	5	0	0	0	20	0
