= He Dequan =

Chinese engineer

- 何德全
- Born: July 31, 1933 (age 93); Beijing, China
- Education: Peking University
- Scientific career
- Fields: Information security
- Workplaces: Advisory Committee for State Informatization (ACSI)

He Dequan (Chinese: 何德全; pinyin: Hé Déquán; born July 31, 1933) is a Chinese engineer specializing in information security. He is an academician of the Chinese Academy of Engineering (CAE) and serves as deputy director of the Advisory Committee for State Informatization (ACSI).

== Biography ==
He was born in Beijing, on July 31, 1933, while his ancestral home in Ningbo, Zhejiang. In 1953 he graduated from Peking University. In the 1980s, he took part in the 863 Program, heading the information security. He once served as director of Beijing Institute of Information Technology Application. On August 21, 2003, he was haired as a part-time professor at Harbin Institute of Technology.

== Honours and awards ==
- November 1994 Member of the Chinese Academy of Engineering (CAE)
