= Zheng Haoqian =

Chinese association football player

Personal information
- Date of birth: 16 November 1998 (age 28)
- Place of birth: Nanping, Fujian, China
- Height: 1.82 m (6 ft 0 in)
- Position: Forward

Team information
- Current team: Wuhan Three Towns
- Number: 29

Youth career
- –2018: Shanghai Port

Senior career*
Years	Team	Apps	(Gls)
2019–2024	Nantong Zhiyun	93	(8)
2025–	Wuhan Three Towns	40	(2)
- * Club domestic league appearances and goals as of 22 November 2026

Zheng Haoqian (Chinese: 郑浩乾; born 16 November 1998) is a Chinese footballer currently playing as a forward for Wuhan Three Towns.

== Club career ==
Zheng Haoqian would play for Shanghai SIPG's youth team before joining second tier club Nantong Zhiyun on 27 February 2019. He would go on to make his debut on 10 March 2019 in a league game against Shijiazhuang Ever Bright in a 2-1 defeat. He would go on to establish himself within the team and helped the club gain promotion to the top tier at the end of the 2022 China League One season.

== Career statistics ==
As of 31 December 2024.

Club	Season	League			Cup		Continental		Other		Total	
Club	Season	Division	Apps	Goals	Apps	Goals	Apps	Goals	Apps	Goals	Apps	Goals
Nantong Zhiyun	2019	China League One	9	0	1	0	–		–		10	0
Nantong Zhiyun	2020	China League One	6	0	0	0	–		–		6	0
Nantong Zhiyun	2021	China League One	3	0	0	0	–		–		3	0
Nantong Zhiyun	2022	China League One	22	2	1	0	–		–		23	2
Nantong Zhiyun	2023	Chinese Super League	24	2	3	1	–		–		27	3
Nantong Zhiyun	2024	Chinese Super League	29	4	2	1	–		–		31	5
Nantong Zhiyun	Total		93	8	7	2	0	0	0	0	100	10
Wuhan Three Towns	2025	Chinese Super League	0	0	0	0	–		–		0	0
Career total			93	8	7	2	0	0	0	0	100	10
