= Jiang Zilei =

Chinese footballer

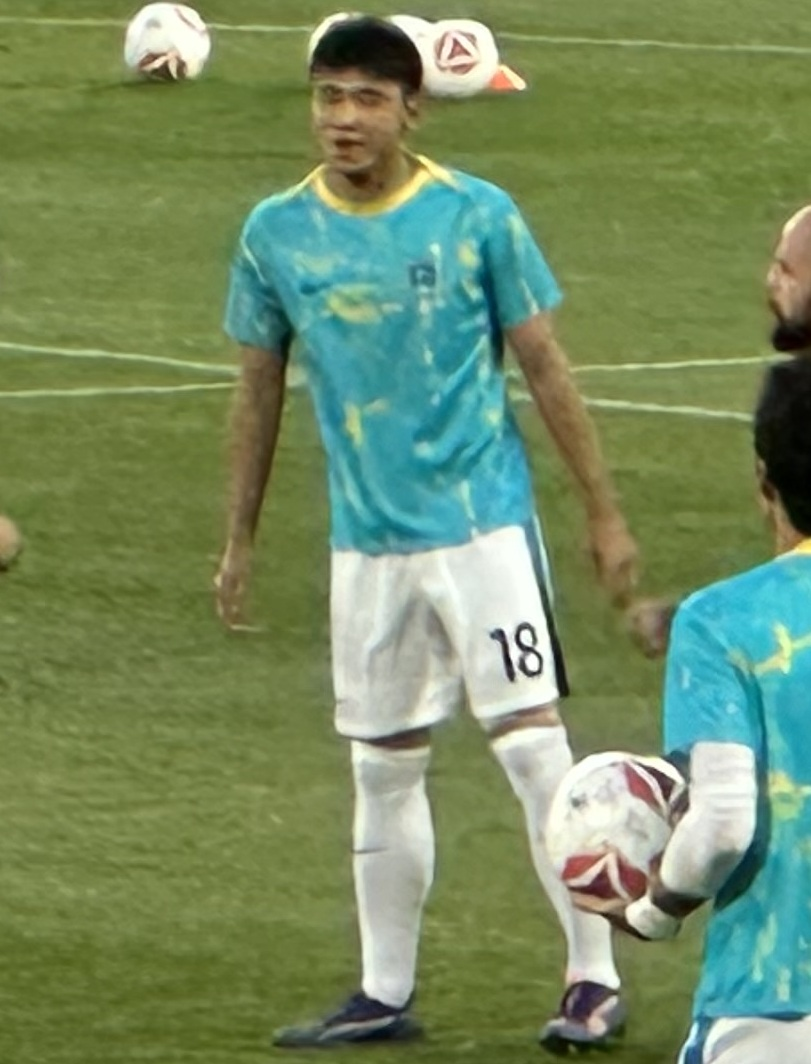
- Jiang Zilei in May 2025

Personal information
- Date of birth: 10 September 1997 (age 29)
- Place of birth: Shanghai, China
- Height: 1.78 m (5 ft 10 in)
- Position: Midfielder

Team information
- Current team: Changchun Yatai
- Number: 35

Youth career
- –2018: Shanghai SIPG

Senior career*
Years	Team	Apps	(Gls)
2017–2018	Shanghai SIPG	0	(0)
2018	→ Wuhan Zall (loan)	2	(0)
2019–2020	Wuhan Zall	23	(0)
2021–2025	Nantong Zhiyun	135	(14)
2026–	Changchun Yatai	0	(0)
- * Club domestic league appearances and goals as of 17:46, 8 March 2026 (UTC)

Jiang Zilei (Chinese: 江子磊; born 10 September 1997) is a Chinese footballer currently playing as a midfielder for China League One club Changchun Yatai.

== Club career ==
Jiang Zilei would play for Shanghai SIPG youth team and would be promoted to the senior team by the end of the 2017 Chinese Super League campaign before going on loan to second tier football club Wuhan Zall on 14 July 2018. He would make his senior debut in a league game on 28 October 2018 against Nei Mongol Zhongyou that ended in a 3-0 victory. In his loan period he would go on to be part of the team that gained promotion to the top tier by winning the 2018 China League One division. On 26 February 2019, Jiang would make his loan period permanent and transferred to Wuhan Zall.

On 10 March 2021, Jiang joined second tier football club Nantong Zhiyun. He would go on to make his debut in a league game on 25 April 2021 against Nanjing City in a 1-1 draw. He would go on to establish himself within the team and helped the club gain promotion to the top tier at the end of the 2022 China League One season.

== Career statistics ==
As of 08 July 2024.

Club	Season	League			Cup		Continental		Other		Total	
Club	Season	Division	Apps	Goals	Apps	Goals	Apps	Goals	Apps	Goals	Apps	Goals
Shanghai SIPG	2017	Chinese Super League	0	0	0	0	0	0	–		0	0
Shanghai SIPG	2018	Chinese Super League	0	0	0	0	0	0	–		0	0
Shanghai SIPG	Total		0	0	0	0	0	0	0	0	0	0
Wuhan Zall (loan)	2018	China League One	2	0	0	0	–		–		2	0
Wuhan Zall	2019	Chinese Super League	13	0	0	0	–		–		13	0
Wuhan Zall	2020	Chinese Super League	10	0	5	1	–		0 (Note: Appearance(s) in Promotion/Relegation Play-offs)	0	15	1
Wuhan Zall	Total		23	0	5	1	0	0	0	0	28	1
Nantong Zhiyun	2021	China League One	33	5	1	0	–		–		34	5
Nantong Zhiyun	2022	China League One	32	7	0	0	–		–		32	7
Nantong Zhiyun	2023	Chinese Super League	25	1	2	0	–		–		27	1
Nantong Zhiyun	2024	Chinese Super League	16	0	0	0	–		–		16	0
Nantong Zhiyun	Total		106	13	3	0	0	0	0	0	109	13
Career total			131	13	8	1	0	0	0	0	139	14

== Honours ==
=== Club ===
Wuhan Zall

- China League One: 2018
