= Liu Xing (footballer) =

Chinese footballer (born 2000)

Personal information
- Date of birth: 17 April 2000 (age 26)
- Place of birth: Meizhou, Guangdong, China
- Height: 1.72 m (5 ft 8 in)
- Position: Left-back

Youth career
- 2013–2017: Villarreal
- 2017–2019: Atlético Madrid

Senior career*
Years	Team	Apps	(Gls)
2019	Guangdong South China Tiger	2	(0)
2020–2022	Chengdu Rongcheng	0	(0)
2022	Hunan Billows	0	(0)

International career
2015	China U14		
2017	China U16		
- * Club domestic league appearances and goals as of 17:14, 30 January 2023 (UTC)

Liu Xing (Chinese: 刘兴; born 17 April 2000), is a Chinese footballer who plays as a left-back.

== Club career ==
Born in Xingning, Meizhou, Guangdong, Liu was selected in 2013 for the Wanda Group's "China's Future Football Star" initiative, to encourage the development of young Chinese players. He started with Villarreal, spending four years before a switch to Atlético Madrid. He returned to China in 2019, joining Guangdong South China Tiger.

After two appearances in China League One with Guangdong South China Tiger, he left the club after it was disbanded. He joined fellow League One side Chengdu Rongcheng in September 2020. He was released in May 2022, without making an appearance for the senior squad, moving to China League Two side Hunan Billows.

== International career ==
Liu has represented China at under-14 and under-16 level.

== Career statistics ==
=== Club ===
As of 30 January 2023.

Appearances and goals by club, season and competition
Club	Season	League			Cup		Other		Total	
Club	Season	Division	Apps	Goals	Apps	Goals	Apps	Goals	Apps	Goals
Guangdong South China Tiger	2019	China League One	2	0	0	0	0	0	2	0
Chengdu Rongcheng	2020	China League One	0	0	0	0	0	0	0	0
Chengdu Rongcheng	2021	China League One	0	0	0	0	0	0	0	0
Chengdu Rongcheng	2022	Chinese Super League	0	0	0	0	0	0	0	0
Chengdu Rongcheng	Total		0	0	0	0	0	0	0	0
Hunan Billows	2022	China League Two	0	0	0	0	0	0	0	0
Career total			2	0	0	0	0	0	2	0
