= Shi Yiyi =

Chinese association football player

Personal information
- Date of birth: 1 November 2001 (age 24)
- Place of birth: Chongqing, China
- Height: 1.79 m (5 ft 10 in)
- Position: Midfielder

Team information
- Current team: Shanghai Second
- Number: 29

Youth career
- –2018: Shanghai Shenxin

Senior career*
Years	Team	Apps	(Gls)
2018	Shanghai Shenxin	0	(0)
2019–2021	Shenzhen FC	0	(0)
2020	→ Qingdao Jonoon (loan)	4	(1)
2022	Ji'nan Xingzhou	11	(1)
2023	Zibo Qisheng	19	(0)
2024–2025	Guizhou Zhucheng Athletic	44	(6)
2026–	Shanghai Second	0	(0)

International career^{‡}
2017-2018	China U17	5	(0)
- * Club domestic league appearances and goals as of 09:21, 8 March 2026 (UTC) ‡ National team caps and goals as of 00:01, 25 December 2021 (UTC)

Shi Yiyi (Chinese: 石一毅; born 1 November 2001) is a Chinese footballer currently playing as a midfielder for China League Two club Shanghai Second.

== Club career ==
Shi made his debut with Qingdao Jonoon in the 2020 China League Two season.

== Career statistics ==
=== Club ===
As of 25 December 2021.

Club	Season	League			Cup		Other		Total	
Club	Season	Division	Apps	Goals	Apps	Goals	Apps	Goals	Apps	Goals
Shanghai Shenxin	2018	China League One	0	0	1 (Note: Appearances in the Chinese FA Cup)	0	0	0	1	0
Shenzhen FC	2019	Chinese Super League	0	0	0	0	0	0	0	0
Shenzhen FC	2020	Chinese Super League	0	0	0	0	0	0	0	0
Shenzhen FC	2021	Chinese Super League	0	0	0	0	0	0	0	0
Shenzhen FC	Total		0	0	0	0	0	0	0	0
Qingdao Jonoon	2020	China League Two	4	1	1	0	0	0	5	1
Career total			4	1	2	0	0	0	6	1
