= Zheng Zhiyun (footballer) =

Chinese footballer

Zheng Zhiyun 郑致云
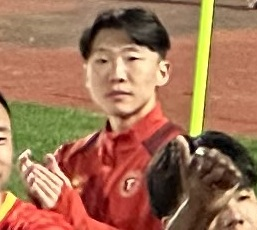
- Zheng Zhiyun in April 2025

Personal information
- Date of birth: 17 February 1995 (age 31)
- Place of birth: Anshan, Liaoning, China
- Height: 1.78 m (5 ft 10 in)
- Position: Left-back

Team information
- Current team: Shijiazhuang Gongfu
- Number: 18

Youth career
- 2006–2013: Shanghai Dongya

Senior career*
Years	Team	Apps	(Gls)
2014–2018	Shanghai SIPG	5	(0)
2018	→ Qingdao Huanghai (loan)	28	(0)
2019–2021	Cangzhou Mighty Lions	41	(1)
2022–2024	Changchun Yatai	14	(0)
2023	→ Nantong Zhiyun (loan)	1	(0)
2024–2025	Liaoning Tieren	21	(0)
2026–	Shijiazhuang Gongfu	0	(0)
- * Club domestic league appearances and goals as of 31 December 2022

Zheng Zhiyun (Chinese: 郑致云; Korean: 정치운; born 17 February 1995) is a Chinese professional football player of Korean descent who currently plays for as a left-back for Shijiazhuang Gongfu.

== Club career ==
Zheng Zhiyun joined Genbao Football Academy from Anshan Sports School in 2006. He was promoted to Shanghai SIPG's first team squad in the 2014 season. On 3 May 2016, he made his senior debut in the last group match of 2016 AFC Champions League against Suwon Samsung Bluewings in a 3–0 away defeat, coming on as a substitution for Zhu Zhengrong in the 59th minute. On 18 June 2017, he made his league debut in a 1–1 away draw against Guangzhou R&F as the benefit of the new rule of the league that at least one Under-23 player must be in the starting line-up and was substituted off in the 16th minute. He scored his first senior goal on 3 August 2017, which was the final goal for Shanghai SIPG as part of a 4–0 home victory against Tianjin Quanjian in the second leg of 2017 Chinese FA Cup fifth round, ensuring Shanghai SIPG overcame a three-goal deficit in the competition. At the end of the 2017 season, he went on to make 10 appearances and score once in all competitions.

On 31 January 2018, Zheng was loaned to China League One side Qingdao Huanghai until 31 December 2018. On 11 March 2018, he made his debut for the club in a 4–2 home win over Dalian Transcendence. Zheng was a regular starter for Qingdao, playing 28 league matches out of 30 in the 2018 season.

On 22 February 2019, Zheng transferred to fellow China League One side Shijiazhuang Ever Bright. In his first season with the club he would help the team to a runners-up position and promotion into the top tier. After three seasons at the club he would join fellow top tier team Changchun Yatai on 13 April 2022 for the 2022 Chinese Super League season. He would make his debut for them in a league game on 12 June 2022 against Dalian Professional in a 1-1 draw.

On 16 January 2026, Zheng joined China League One club Shijiazhuang Gongfu.

== Career statistics ==
Statistics accurate as of match played 31 December 2022.

Appearances and goals by club, season and competition
Club	Season	League			National Cup		Continental		Other		Total	
Club	Season	Division	Apps	Goals	Apps	Goals	Apps	Goals	Apps	Goals	Apps	Goals
Shanghai SIPG	2014	Chinese Super League	0	0	0	0	-		-		0	0
Shanghai SIPG	2015	Chinese Super League	0	0	0	0	-		-		0	0
Shanghai SIPG	2016	Chinese Super League	0	0	0	0	1	0	-		1	0
Shanghai SIPG	2017	Chinese Super League	5	0	2	1	3	0	-		10	1
Shanghai SIPG	Total		5	0	2	1	4	0	0	0	11	1
Qingdao Huanghai (loan)	2018	China League One	28	0	1	0	-		-		29	0
Shijiazhuang Ever Bright	2019	China League One	12	1	0	0	-		-		12	1
Shijiazhuang Ever Bright	2020	Chinese Super League	17	0	0	0	-		-		17	0
Shijiazhuang Ever Bright	2021	Chinese Super League	12	0	1	0	-		-		13	0
Shijiazhuang Ever Bright	Total		41	1	1	0	0	0	0	0	42	1
Changchun Yatai	2022	Chinese Super League	14	0	0	0	-		-		14	0
Career total			88	1	4	1	4	0	0	0	96	2

== Honours ==
Liaoning Tieren

- China League One: 2025
