= Wang Jiong (footballer) =

Chinese footballer

Wang Jiong 王炯
Personal information
- Full name: Wang Jiong
- Date of birth: 5 January 1994 (age 32)
- Place of birth: Zhengzhou, Henan, China
- Height: 1.84 m (6 ft 1/2 in)
- Position: Defender

Team information
- Current team: Rizhao Yuqi
- Number: 5

Youth career
- Shandong Luneng

Senior career*
Years	Team	Apps	(Gls)
2011–2012	Shandong Youth	19	(2)
2013–2014	→ Casa Pia (loan)	1	(0)
2015–2020	Shandong Luneng	2	(0)
2018	→ Sichuan Jiuniu (loan)	8	(0)
2019	→ Beijing BSU (loan)	12	(0)
2021-2023	Taian Tiankuang	22	(1)
2024-	Rizhao Yuqi	6	(0)
- * Club domestic league appearances and goals as of 19 August 2024

Wang Jiong (Chinese: 王炯; pinyin: Wáng Jiǒng; born 5 January 1994) is a Chinese footballer who currently plays for China League Two side Rizhao Yuqi.

== Club career ==
Wang Jiong started his football career when he played for China League Two side Shandong Youth in 2011 and 2012. In August 2013, he was loaned to Campeonato de Portugal side Casa Pia for one season. Wang was promoted to Shandong Luneng's first team squad by Cuca in the 2015 season. On 4 May 2016, he made his debut for Shandong in the last group match of 2016 AFC Champions League against Buriram United with a 0–0 away draw, coming on as a substitution for Zhang Chi in the 48th minute. He made his Super League debut on 9 July 2016 in a 2–1 victory against Jiangsu Suning.

On 23 June 2018, Wang was loaned to China League Two side Sichuan Jiuniu for the rest of the season. He made his debut on the same day in a 1–1 away draw against Zhenjiang Huasa. On 7 July 2018, he scored an own goal in a 3–0 away defeat against Dalian Yifang in the Quarter-Finals of 2018 Chinese FA Cup. In February 2019, Wang was loaned to China League One side Beijing BSU for the 2019 season.

== Career statistics ==
As of 19 August 2024.

Appearances and goals by club, season and competition
Club	Season	League			National Cup		Continental		Other		Total	
Club	Season	Division	Apps	Goals	Apps	Goals	Apps	Goals	Apps	Goals	Apps	Goals
Shandong Youth	2011	China League Two	0	0	-		-		-		0	0
Shandong Youth	2012	China League Two	19	2	0	0	-		-		19	2
Shandong Youth	Total		19	2	0	0	0	0	0	0	19	2
Casa Pia (loan)	2013–14	Campeonato de Portugal	1	0	0	0	-		-		1	0
Shandong Luneng Taishan	2015	Chinese Super League	0	0	0	0	0	0	0 (Note: Appearances in Chinese FA Super Cup)	0	0	0
Shandong Luneng Taishan	2016	Chinese Super League	2	0	0	0	1	0	-		3	0
Shandong Luneng Taishan	2017	Chinese Super League	0	0	0	0	-		-		0	0
Shandong Luneng Taishan	Total		2	0	0	0	1	0	0	0	3	0
Sichuan Jiuniu (loan)	2018	China League Two	8	0	2	0	-		-		10	0
Beijing BSU (loan)	2019	China League One	12	0	1	0	-		-		13	0
Taian Tiankuang	2021	Chinese Champions League	-		-		-		-		-	
Taian Tiankuang	2022	China League Two	10	1	-		-		-		10	1
Taian Tiankuang	2023	China League Two	12	0	1	0	-		-		13	0
Taian Tiankuang	Total		22	1	1	0	1	0	0	0	23	1
Rizhao Yuqi	2024	China League Two	6	0	2	0	-		-		8	0
Career total			70	3	6	0	1	0	0	0	77	3
