= Dilmurat Mawlanyaz =

Chinese footballer

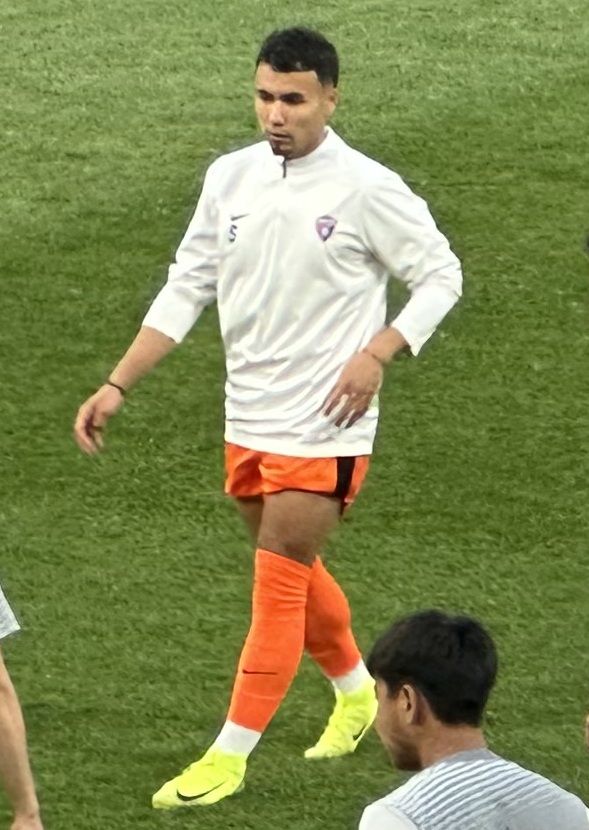
- Dilmurat in May 2025

Personal information
- Date of birth: 8 April 1998 (age 28)
- Place of birth: Korla, Xinjiang, China
- Height: 1.71 m (5 ft 7 in)
- Position: Right-back

Team information
- Current team: Liaoning Tieren
- Number: 5

Senior career*
Years	Team	Apps	(Gls)
2017–2018	Xinjiang Tianshan Leopard	34	(0)
2019–2020	Chongqing Dangdai	43	(1)
2021–2023	Henan FC	53	(2)
2024–2025	Yunnan Yukun	47	(2)
2026–	Liaoning Tieren	24	(0)

International career^{‡}
2018	China U19	4	(0)
2020	China U23	3	(0)
- * Club domestic league appearances and goals as of 22 November 2026 ‡ National team caps and goals as of 17:41, 3 January 2020 (UTC)

Dilmurat Mawlanyaz (Chinese: 迪力穆拉提·毛拉尼牙孜; pinyin: Dílìmùlātí Máolāníyázī; born 8 April 1998) is a Chinese footballer, currently playing as a right-back for Liaoning Tieren.

== Club career ==
Dilmurat Mawlanyaz would start his senior career at second tier football club Xinjiang Tianshan Leopard in the 2017 league campaign, where he would make his debut in a league game on 24 September 2017 against Meizhou Hakka in a 3-1 defeat. In the following season he would go on to establish himself as an integral member of the team and played in every league game of the campaign. On 21 February 2019 he signed for top tier club Chongqing Dangdai Lifan. He would make his debut in a league game on 2 March 2019 against Guangzhou R&F in a 2-2 draw. After the game he would go on to establish himself as an integral member of the team and go on to score his first goal for the club on 11 May 2019, in a league game against Beijing Renhe in a 2-0 victory.

On 1 January 2021, Dilmurat signed for fellow top tier club Henan Songshan Longmen (later renamed as simply Henan FC) before the start of the 2021 Chinese Super League campaign. He would make his debut in a league game on 24 April 2021 against Shenzhen FC in a 2-1 defeat. After the game he would go on to establish himself as a regular member of the team and go on to score his first goal for the club on 13 October 2021, in a Chinese FA Cup game against Meixian Qiuxiang in a 5-1 victory.

On 26 December 2025, Dilmurat joined Chinese Super League club Liaoning Tieren in 2026 season.

== Career statistics ==
As of match played 31 December 2025.

Appearances and goals by club, season and competition
Club	Season	League			National Cup		Continental		Other		Total	
Club	Season	Division	Apps	Goals	Apps	Goals	Apps	Goals	Apps	Goals	Apps	Goals
Xinjiang Tianshan Leopard	2017	China League One	4	0	0	0	–		–		4	0
Xinjiang Tianshan Leopard	2018	China League One	30	0	1	0	–		–		31	0
Xinjiang Tianshan Leopard	Total		34	0	1	0	0	0	0	0	35	0
Chongqing Dangdai Lifan	2019	Chinese Super League	30	1	2	0	–		–		32	1
Chongqing Dangdai Lifan	2020	Chinese Super League	13	0	1	0	–		–		14	0
Chongqing Dangdai Lifan	Total		43	1	3	0	0	0	0	0	46	1
Henan Songshan Longmen/ Henan FC	2021	Chinese Super League	20	0	4	1	–		–		24	1
Henan Songshan Longmen/ Henan FC	2022	Chinese Super League	12	1	0	0	–		–		12	1
Henan Songshan Longmen/ Henan FC	2023	Chinese Super League	21	1	1	0	–		–		22	1
Henan Songshan Longmen/ Henan FC	Total		53	2	5	1	0	0	0	0	58	3
Yunnan Yukun	2024	China League One	24	0	2	0	–		–		26	0
Yunnan Yukun	2025	Chinese Super League	23	2	4	0	–		–		27	2
Yunnan Yukun	Total		47	2	6	0	0	0	0	0	53	2
Career total			177	5	15	1	0	0	0	0	192	6
