= Jilin Baijia F.C. =

Chinese football club

Jilin Baijia Jílín Bǎijiā 吉林百嘉
- Full name: Jilin Baijia Football Club 吉林百嘉足球俱乐部
- Founded: 2015; 11 years ago
- Dissolved: 2020

Jilin Baijia Football Club was a football club based in Changchun, Jilin, China.

== History ==
Changchun Baihe F.C. was founded on March 11, 2011, by Changchun Baihe Construction Co. Ltd.. It participated in local amateur leagues in the city of Changchun until January 19, 2016, when it was merged with another local team, Changchun Caliux (founded on May 1, 2014, by Changchun Caliux Lubricant Co. Ltd.), and was rebranded as a professional team named Jilin Baijia, with its name being the combination of the first characters of its two patron companies' Chinese name. They participated in the 2016 China Amateur Football League and advanced to the final play-off stage, when they lost to Shaanxi Chang'an Athletic 5–6 in penalty shootout in the quarterfinals, suffering a bitter defeat as they watched their opponents celebrate their promotion to China League Two. However, they were later admitted into 2017 China League Two to fill in a spot left by withdrawn team Jingtie Locomotive F.C.

Jilin Baijia failed to participate in the 2020 China League Two season due to its failure to submit the confirmation form of salaries and bonuses from 2019 on time.

== Name history ==
- 2011–2015 Changchun Baihe F.C. 长春百和
- 2016–2020 Jilin Baijia F.C. 吉林百嘉

== Managerial history ==
- (China) Li Bin (2016)
- (Serbia) Zoran Kitanoski (2017–2020)

== Results ==
All-time league rankings

As of the end of 2019 season.

| Year | Div | Pld | W | D | L | GF | GA | GD | Pts | Pos. | FA Cup | Super Cup | AFC | Att./G | Stadium |
|---|---|---|---|---|---|---|---|---|---|---|---|---|---|---|---|
| 2016 | 4 | | | | | | | | | 5 | DNQ | DNQ | DNQ | | |
| 2017 | 3 | 24 | 3 | 11 | 10 | 16 | 30 | −14 | 20 | 20 | R3 | DNQ | DNQ | 676 | Changchun City Stadium |
| 2018 | 3 | 28 | 13 | 5 | 10 | 43 | 37 | 6 | 44 | 14 | R3 | DNQ | DNQ | 437 | Development Area Stadium |
| 2019 | 3 | 30 | 7 | 6 | 17 | 24 | 46 | −22 | 27^{1} | 22 | R16 | DNQ | DNQ | | Development Area Stadium |

- ^1 In group stage.

Key

| | China top division |
| | China second division |
| | China third division |
| | China fourth division |
| W | Winners |
| RU | Runners-up |
| 3 | Third place |
| | Relegated |

- Pld = Played
- W = Games won
- D = Games drawn
- L = Games lost
- F = Goals for
- A = Goals against
- Pts = Points
- Pos = Final position
- DNQ = Did not qualify
- DNE = Did not enter
- NH = Not Held
- – = Does Not Exist
- R1 = Round 1
- R2 = Round 2
- R3 = Round 3
- R4 = Round 4
- F = Final
- SF = Semi-finals
- QF = Quarter-finals
- R16 = Round of 16
- Group = Group stage
- GS2 = Second Group stage
- QR1 = First Qualifying Round
- QR2 = Second Qualifying Round
- QR3 = Third Qualifying Round
