= Inner Mongolia Caoshangfei F.C. =

Chinese football club

Inner Mongolia Caoshangfei 内蒙古草上飞
- Full name: Inner Mongolia Caoshangfei Football Club 内蒙古草上飞足球俱乐部
- Founded: 1998; 27 years ago
- Ground: Baotou Olympic Sports Centre Stadium, Baotou
- Capacity: 40,545
- Manager: Yao Zhiqiang
- 2024: Chinese Champions League: Qualification group C, 3rd of 4
Home colours	Away colours

Inner Mongolia Caoshangfei Football Club (Chinese: 内蒙古草上飞足球俱乐部; pinyin: Nèi Měnggǔ Cǎoshàngfēi Zúqiú Jùlèbù; lit. 'Inner Mongolia Flying on the Grass F.C.') is a Chinese semi-professional football club based in Baotou, Inner Mongolia, that competes in . Inner Mongolia Caoshangfei plays its home matches at the Baotou Olympic Sports Centre Stadium, located within Jiuyuan District.

== History ==
On 5 May 1998 the club was established as a local amateur football team who took part in the regional Baotou leagues. They gradually worked their way up through the regional leagues until they were able to enter 2012 China Amateur Football League where they finished seventh. The local Baotou Municipal Sports Bureau would become interested supporting the team. By the 2014 league season they would financially invest into the team to take part in the 2014 Chinese FA Cup where they were knocked out in the first official round to Guizhou Zhicheng F.C. in a 3–1 home defeat. They continued to support the team and helped Baotou Nanjiao F.C. to officially establish themselves as a professional unit on 25 January 2015 to allow them to take part in the 2015 China League Two season. Baotou Nanjiao F.C. changed their name to Inner Mongolia Caoshangfei F.C. in January 2019.

== Name history ==
- 2015–2018 Baotou Nanjiao F.C. 包头南郊
- 2019– Inner Mongolia Caoshangfei F.C. 内蒙古草上飞

== Players ==
=== Current squad ===
As of 1 January 2023

Note: Flags indicate national team as defined under FIFA eligibility rules; some limited exceptions apply. Players may hold more than one non-FIFA nationality.

No.	Pos.	Nation	Player
3	DF	CHN	Tang-Kang Beiyi
8	FW	CHN	Imamhesen Ababekri
9	MF	CHN	Zhao Xiaodong
10	FW	CHN	Zhang Hang
11	FW	CHN	Bao Jinzhu
13	DF	CHN	Liu Xuanchi
15	DF	CHN	Cui Yuyang
16	DF	CHN	Zhang Hao
17	MF	CHN	Wang Tongzhou
18	MF	CHN	Xia Wenshuai
19	FW	CHN	Liu Yuehai
22	DF	CHN	Wang Yong

No.	Pos.	Nation	Player
23	GK	CHN	Yuan Weihao
24	DF	CHN	Zhang Mengxuan
26	GK	CHN	Pang Jun
32	MF	CHN	Chen Fujun
45	MF	CHN	Meng Jiahui
46	GK	CHN	Yang Chaoran
47	DF	CHN	Yang Yuankun
52	DF	CHN	Wang Jiaqi
55	DF	CHN	Deng Hanqi
56	DF	CHN	Dong Huahui
57	FW	CHN	Epolan Jenisbek
58	MF	CHN	Su Ming

== Managerial history ==
- (China) Yao Zhiqiang (2014)
- (China) Xu Hui (2015)
- (France) David Camhi (2016)
- (China) Wang Hongwei (2017)
- (China) Fan Wenlong (caretaker) (2017)
- (Serbia) Branko Božović （2017–2019）
- (Serbia) Zoran Maričić （2020–2021）

== Results ==
All-time league rankings

As of the end of 2019 season.

Year	Div	Pld	W	D	L	GF	GA	GD	Pts	Pos.	FA Cup	Super Cup	AFC	Att./G	Stadium
2012	4									6	DNQ	DNQ	DNQ		
2013	4									6^{1}	DNQ	DNQ	DNQ		
2014	4									10	R1	DNQ	DNQ		Baotou Olympic Sports Centre Stadium
2015	3	14	5	5	4	21	13	8	20	6^{1}	R2	DNQ	DNQ	6,065	Baotou Olympic Sports Centre Stadium
2016	3	20	5	4	11	23	36	−13	19	12	R1	DNQ	DNQ	1,708	Baotou Olympic Sports Centre Stadium
2017	3	24	2	2	20	14	54	−40	8	23^{2}	R1	DNQ	DNQ	3,202	Baotou Olympic Sports Centre Stadium
2018	3	28	5	0	23	30	68	−38	15	25	R2	DNQ	DNQ	427	Baotou Olympic Sports Centre Stadium
2019	3	30	6	7	17	26	63	−37	25^{1}	29	R2	DNQ	DNQ		Baotou Olympic Sports Centre Stadium

- ^1 in North Group.
- ^2 Chengdu Qbao and Shanghai JuJu Sports withdrew, so Baotou Nanjiao could stay at third level.

Key

	China top division
	China second division
	China third division
	China fourth division
W	Winners
RU	Runners-up
3	Third place
	Relegated

- Pld = Played
- W = Games won
- D = Games drawn
- L = Games lost
- F = Goals for
- A = Goals against
- Pts = Points
- Pos = Final position
- DNQ = Did not qualify
- DNE = Did not enter
- NH = Not Held
- – = Does Not Exist
- R1 = Round 1
- R2 = Round 2
- R3 = Round 3
- R4 = Round 4
- F = Final
- SF = Semi-finals
- QF = Quarter-finals
- R16 = Round of 16
- Group = Group stage
- GS2 = Second Group stage
- QR1 = First Qualifying Round
- QR2 = Second Qualifying Round
- QR3 = Third Qualifying Round
