= 2018 in Chinese football =

Football in China
- Season: 2018

Men's football
- Super League: Shanghai SIPG
- League One: Wuhan Zall
- League Two: Sichuan Longfor
- Champions League: Taizhou Yuanda
- FA Cup: Beijing Sinobo Guoan
- CFA Super Cup: Guangzhou Evergrande Taobao

The 2018 season was the 68th season of competitive association football in China.

== Promotion and relegation ==
League	Promoted to league	Relegated from league
Chinese Super League	Dalian Yifang; Beijing Renhe	Yanbian Funde; Liaoning Whowin
China League One	Heilongjiang Lava Spring; Meixian Techand	Baoding Yingli ETS; Yunnan Lijiang
China League Two	Zibo Sunday; Anhui Hefei Guiguan; Yanbian Beiguo; Fujian Tianxin; Shenzhen Pengcheng; Sichuan Jiuniu	

== Men's Football ==
=== League season ===
==== Chinese Super League ====
Pos	Team	Pld	W	D	L	GF	GA	GD	Pts	Qualification or relegation
1	Shanghai SIPG (C)	30	21	5	4	77	33	+44	68	Qualification to Champions League group stage
2	Guangzhou Evergrande Taobao	30	20	3	7	82	36	+46	63	Qualification to Champions League group stage
3	Shandong Luneng Taishan	30	17	7	6	57	39	+18	58	Qualification to Champions League play-off round
4	Beijing Sinobo Guoan (Note: Beijing Sinobo Guoan qualified for the 2019 AFC Champions League group stage as 2018 Chinese FA Cup winners.)	30	15	8	7	64	45	+19	53	Qualification to Champions League group stage
5	Jiangsu Suning	30	13	9	8	48	33	+15	48	
6	Hebei China Fortune	30	10	9	11	46	50	−4	39	
7	Shanghai Greenland Shenhua	30	10	8	12	44	53	−9	38	
8	Beijing Renhe	30	9	10	11	33	46	−13	37	
9	Tianjin Quanjian	30	9	9	12	41	48	−7	36 (Note: Tianjin Quanjian is ahead of Guangzhou R&F on head-to-head points: Tianjin Quanjian 2–1 Guangzhou R&F, Guangzhou R&F 2–6 Tianjin Quanjian.)	
10	Guangzhou R&F	30	10	6	14	49	61	−12	36	
11	Dalian Yifang	30	10	5	15	37	57	−20	35	
12	Henan Jianye	30	10	4	16	30	45	−15	34	
13	Chongqing Dangdai Lifan	30	8	8	14	40	46	−6	32 (Note: Chongqing Dangdai Lifan, Tianjin TEDA and Changchun Yatai were ranked by head-to-head points: Chongqing Dangdai Lifan 7 pts, Tianjin Teda 5 pts, Changchun Yatai 4 pts.)	
14	Tianjin TEDA	30	8	8	14	41	54	−13	32	
15	Changchun Yatai (R)	30	8	8	14	45	56	−11	32	Relegation to League One
16	Guizhou Hengfeng (R)	30	7	3	20	34	66	−32	24	Relegation to League One

Source: League table
Rules for classification: 1) Points; 2) Head-to-head points; 3) Head-to-head goal difference; 4) Head-to-head goals scored; 5) Reserve league points; 6) U19 Elite league points; 7) Goal difference; 8) Goals scored; 9) Disciplinary points (1 point for each yellow card, 3 points for each red card); 10) Draw
(C) Champions; (R) Relegated

==== China League One ====
Pos	Team	Pld	W	D	L	GF	GA	GD	Pts	Promotion, qualification or relegation
1	Wuhan Zall (C, P)	30	18	9	3	60	25	+35	63	Promotion to Super League
2	Shenzhen F.C. (P)	30	15	8	7	57	34	+23	53	Promotion to Super League
3	Zhejiang Greentown	30	14	9	7	53	38	+15	51	
4	Qingdao Huanghai	30	13	10	7	63	44	+19	49	
5	Beijing Enterprises Group	30	12	11	7	43	34	+9	47	
6	Shijiazhuang Ever Bright	30	12	9	9	43	38	+5	45	
7	Heilongjiang Lava Spring (Note: Ineligible for promotion.)	30	10	11	9	37	33	+4	41 (Note: Heilongjiang Lava Spring is ahead of Liaoning on head-to-head points: Heilongjiang Lava Spring 2–0 Liaoning, Liaoning 2–1 Heilongjiang Lava Spring.)	
8	Liaoning F.C.	30	11	8	11	35	44	−9	41	
9	Meizhou Hakka	30	11	7	12	40	43	−3	40	
10	Yanbian Funde (Note: Yanbian Funde was disqualified by CFA and was dissolved due to tax owed.) (R, D, R)	30	11	5	14	34	36	−2	38	Disbanded after season
11	Shanghai Shenxin	30	11	4	15	37	45	−8	37 (Note: Shanghai Shenxin is ahead of Zhejiang Yiteng on head-to-head points: Shanghai Shenxin 1–0 Zhejiang Yiteng, Zhejiang Yiteng 0–1 Shanghai Shenxin.)	
12	Zhejiang Yiteng (D, R)	30	10	7	13	43	53	−10	37	Relegation to League Two
13	Nei Mongol Zhongyou	30	10	4	16	36	54	−18	34 (Note: Nei Mongol Zhongyou is ahead of Meizhou Meixian Techand on head-to-head points: Nei Mongol Zhongyou 1–0 Meizhou Meixian Techand, Meizhou Meixian Techand 1–3 Nei Mongol Zhongyou.)	
14	Meizhou Meixian Techand (O)	30	8	10	12	41	44	−3	34	Qualification to Relegation play-offs
15	Dalian Transcendence (Note: Dalian Transcendence was ineligible for promotion. And Dalian was dissolved after failing to submit the salary & bonus confirmation form.) (R, D)	30	7	7	16	28	48	−20	28	Disbanded after season
16	Xinjiang Tianshan Leopard	30	3	9	18	24	61	−37	18	

Source: League table
Rules for classification: 1) Points; 2) Head-to-head points; 3) Head-to-head goal difference; 4) Head-to-head goals scored; 5) Reserve league points; 6) Goal difference; 7) Goals scored; 8) Disciplinary points (1 point for each yellow card, 3 points for each red card); 9) Draw
(C) Champions; (D) Disqualified; (O) Play-off winners; (P) Promoted; (R) Relegated

==== China League Two ====
===== North Group =====
Pos	Team	Pld	W	D	L	GF	GA	GD	Pts	Promotion or relegation
1	Shaanxi Chang'an Athletic (Q, P)	26	17	2	7	41	20	+21	53	Qualification to Play-offs
2	Jiangsu Yancheng Dingli (Q)	26	15	7	4	45	20	+25	52 (Note: Jiangsu Yancheng Dingli is ahead of Shenyang Urban on head-to-head points: Jiangsu Yancheng Dingli 2–1 Shenyang Urban, Shenyang Urban 1–2 Jiangsu Yancheng Dingli.)	Qualification to Play-offs
3	Shenyang Urban (Q)	26	16	4	6	51	28	+23	52	Qualification to Play-offs
4	Qingdao Jonoon (Q)	26	16	3	7	44	23	+21	51	Qualification to Play-offs
5	Yinchuan Helanshan	26	14	7	5	45	23	+22	49	9th–26th place Play-offs
6	Hebei Elite	26	11	10	5	50	32	+18	43 (Note: Hebei Elite is ahead of Jilin Baijia on head-to-head points: Hebei Elite 2–1 Jilin Baijia, Jilin Baijia 3–5 Hebei Elite.)	9th–26th place Play-offs
7	Jilin Baijia	26	13	4	9	41	33	+8	43	9th–26th place Play-offs
8	Baoding Yingli ETS	26	13	3	10	38	30	+8	42	9th–26th place Play-offs
9	Dalian Boyoung	26	12	4	10	34	27	+7	40	9th–26th place Play-offs
10	Zibo Sunday	26	10	5	11	34	31	+3	35	9th–26th place Play-offs
11	Beijing BIT	26	8	2	16	39	50	−11	26	9th–26th place Play-offs
12	Yanbian Beiguo	26	7	3	16	29	49	−20	24	9th–26th place Play-offs
13	Baotou Nanjiao	26	3	0	23	24	68	−44	9	9th–26th place Play-offs
14	Shenyang Dongjin	26	0	0	26	0	81	−81	0	Defunct

Rules for classification: 1) Points; 2) Head-to-head points; 3) Head-to-head goal difference; 4) Head-to-head goals scored; 5) Goal difference; 6) Goals scored; 7) Disciplinary points (1 point for each yellow card, 3 points for each red card)
(P) Promoted; (Q) Qualified for the phase indicated

===== South Group =====
Pos	Team	Pld	W	D	L	GF	GA	GD	Pts	Promotion or relegation
1	Sichuan Longfor (Q, C, P)	26	23	3	0	86	10	+76	72	Qualification to Play-offs
2	Nantong Zhiyun (Q, P)	26	18	4	4	55	21	+34	58	Qualification to Play-offs
3	Fujian Tianxin (Q)	26	12	7	7	33	24	+9	43	Qualification to Play-offs
4	Shenzhen Ledman (Q)	26	11	8	7	31	26	+5	41	Qualification to Play-offs
5	Hunan Billows	26	10	10	6	42	28	+14	40	9th–26th place Play-offs
6	Suzhou Dongwu	26	10	9	7	26	26	0	39 (Note: Suzhou Dongwu is ahead of Zhenjiang Huasa on head-to-head points: Suzhou Dongwu 0–0 Zhenjiang Huasa, Zhenjiang Huasa 0–1 Suzhou Dongwu.)	9th–26th place Play-offs
7	Zhenjiang Huasa	26	11	6	9	27	31	−4	39	9th–26th place Play-offs
8	Hainan Boying	26	8	9	9	22	28	−6	33 (Note: Hainan Boying and Shenzhen Pengcheng are ahead of Yunnan Flying Tigers on head-to-head points: Hainan Boying 5 pts, Shenzhen Pengcheng 5 pts, Yunnan Flying Tigers 4 pts. Hainan Boying is ahead of Shenzhen Pengcheng on head-to-head goals scored.)	9th–26th place Play-offs
9	Shenzhen Pengcheng	26	8	9	9	24	24	0	33	9th–26th place Play-offs
10	Yunnan Flying Tigers	26	8	9	9	29	23	+6	33	9th–26th place Play-offs
11	Jiangxi Liansheng	26	7	9	10	33	32	+1	30	9th–26th place Play-offs
12	Sichuan Jiuniu	26	6	9	11	23	25	−2	27	9th–26th place Play-offs
13	Shanghai Sunfun	26	3	2	21	18	73	−55	11	9th–26th place Play-offs
14	Anhui Hefei Guiguan	26	0	0	26	0	78	−78	0	Defunct

Rules for classification: 1) Points; 2) Head-to-head points; 3) Head-to-head goal difference; 4) Head-to-head goals scored; 5) Goal difference; 6) Goals scored; 7) Disciplinary points (1 point for each yellow card, 3 points for each red card)
(C) Champions; (P) Promoted; (Q) Qualified for the phase indicated

===== Overall table =====
Pos	Team	Pld	W	D	L	GF	GA	GD	Pts	Promotion or relegation
1	Sichuan Longfor (C, P)	31	27	4	0	95	10	+85	85	China League One
2	Nantong Zhiyun (P)	31	21	5	5	58	22	+36	68	China League One
3	Shaanxi Chang'an Athletic (Note: Shaanxi Chang'an Athletic was originally advanced to promotion play-offs but lost in the promotion play-offs. However, Shaanxi was promoted following the disqualification of the China League One side Yanbian Funde.) (P)	31	18	4	9	44	24	+20	58	China League One
4	Jiangsu Yancheng Dingli	31	16	9	6	46	23	+23	57	
5	Shenzhen Ledman	28	11	10	7	33	28	+5	43	Disbanded after season
6	Shenyang Urban	28	16	5	7	51	29	+22	53	
7	Fujian Tianxin	28	12	8	8	33	25	+8	44	
8	Qingdao Jonoon	28	16	3	9	44	29	+15	51	
9	Yinchuan Helanshan	28	16	7	5	49	24	+25	55	
10	Hunan Billows	28	10	10	8	43	32	+11	40	
11	Hebei Elite	28	12	11	5	55	33	+22	47	
12	Suzhou Dongwu	28	10	10	8	27	31	−4	40	
13	Zhenjiang Huasa	28	12	7	9	31	33	−2	43	
14	Jilin Baijia	28	13	5	10	43	37	+6	44	
15	Baoding Yingli ETS	28	15	3	10	42	31	+11	48	
16	Hainan Boying	28	8	9	11	23	32	−9	33	Disbanded after season
17	Dalian Boyoung	28	14	4	10	40	30	+10	46	
18	Shenzhen Pengcheng	28	8	9	11	27	30	−3	33	
19	Zibo Sunday	28	12	5	11	38	32	+6	41	
20	Yunnan Flying Tigers (Note: Yunnan Flying Tigers was disqualified by CFA.)	28	8	9	11	30	27	+3	33	Disbanded after season
21	Beijing BIT	28	9	3	16	44	53	−9	30	
22	Jiangxi Liansheng	28	7	10	11	36	37	−1	31	
23	Yanbian Beiguo	28	8	4	16	31	50	−19	28	
24	Sichuan Jiuniu	28	6	10	12	24	27	−3	28	
25	Baotou Nanjiao	28	5	0	23	30	68	−38	15	
26	Shanghai Sunfun	28	3	2	23	18	79	−61	11	Disbanded after season
27	Anhui Hefei Guiguan	26	0	0	26	0	78	−78	0	Defunct
28	Shenyang Dongjin	26	0	0	26	0	81	−81	0	Defunct

Updated to match(es) played on completed. Source:
Rules for classification: (Teams ranked 5th-8th) 1) Points in playoffs; 2) Goal difference in playoffs; 3) Goals scored in playoffs; 4) Average points in group stage; 5) Drawing of lots
(Teams ranked 9th-26th) 1) Points in playoffs; 2) Goals scored in playoffs; 3) Away goals scored in playoffs; 4) Overtime; 5) Penalty shoot-out
(C) Champions; (P) Promoted

===== Play-offs =====
====== 25th–26th place ======
Team 1	Agg.	Team 2	1st leg	2nd leg
Baotou Nanjiao	6–0	Shanghai Sunfun	3–0	3–0

====== 23rd–24th place ======
Team 1	Agg.	Team 2	1st leg	2nd leg
Yanbian Beiguo	2–1	Sichuan Jiuniu	1–1	1–0

====== 21st–22nd place ======
Team 1	Agg.	Team 2	1st leg	2nd leg
Beijing BIT	5–3	Jiangxi Liansheng	3–1	2–2

====== 19th–20th place ======
Team 1	Agg.	Team 2	1st leg	2nd leg
Yunnan Flying Tigers	1–4	Zibo Sunday	1–2	0–2

====== 17th–18th place ======
Team 1	Agg.	Team 2	1st leg	2nd leg
Shenzhen Pengcheng	3–6	Dalian Boyoung	1–2	2–4

====== 15th–16th place ======
Team 1	Agg.	Team 2	1st leg	2nd leg
Hainan Boying	1–4	Baoding Yingli ETS	0–1	1–3

====== 13th–14th place ======
Team 1	Agg.	Team 2	1st leg	2nd leg
Jilin Baijia	2–4	Zhenjiang Huasa	0–2	2–2

====== 11th–12th place ======
Team 1	Agg.	Team 2	1st leg	2nd leg
Suzhou Dongwu	1–5	Hebei Elite	1–1	0–4

====== 9th–10th place ======
Team 1	Agg.	Team 2	1st leg	2nd leg
Hunan Billows	1–4	Yinchuan Helanshan	1–3	0–1

====== Quarter-finals ======
Team 1	Agg.	Team 2	1st leg	2nd leg
Shenzhen Ledman	2–2 (a)	Shaanxi Chang'an Athletic	2–2	0–0
Shenyang Urban	0–1	Nantong Zhiyun	0–0	0–1
Qingdao Jonoon	0–6	Sichuan Longfor	0–2	0–4
Fujian Tianxin	0–1	Jiangsu Yancheng Dingli	0–0	0–1

====== Semi-finals ======
Team 1	Agg.	Team 2	1st leg	2nd leg
Nantong Zhiyun	2–0	Shaanxi Chang'an Athletic	1–0	1–0
Jiangsu Yancheng Dingli	0–2 (a.e.t.)	Sichuan Longfor	0–0	0–2

====== Third-Place Match ======
3 November 2018
15:00

Shaanxi Chang'an Athletic	1–0	Jiangsu Yancheng Dingli
Yang He 90+1'

Shaanxi Province Stadium, Xi'an
Attendance: 35,683
Referee: Muhammad Taqi (Singapore)

Shaanxi Chang'an Athletic qualified to 2018 China League One relegation play-offs.

====== Final Match ======
4 November 2018
17:00

Nantong Zhiyun	0–1	Sichuan Longfor
		Zhang Jingyang 66'

Rugao Olympic Sports Center, Rugao
Attendance: 14,986
Referee: Xing Qi

=== Cup competitions ===
==== Chinese FA Super Cup ====
26 February 2018
19:35 UTC+8

Guangzhou Evergrande Taobao	4–1	Shanghai Greenland Shenhua
Huang Bowen 26'; Alan 43'; Gao Lin 65'; Goulart 90+2' (pen.)	Report	Guarín 36'

Hongkou Football Stadium, Shanghai
Attendance: 23,998
Referee: Fu Ming (Beijing)
