= 2017 China Amateur Football League =

Football league season

China Amateur Football League
- Season: 2017
- Champions: Zibo Sunday
- Promoted: Zibo Sunday; Anhui Hefei Guiguan; Yanbian Beiguo; Fujian Tianxin; Shenzhen Pengcheng; Sichuan Jiuniu

The 2017 China Amateur Football League season, also known as Shan Lin Financial China Amateur Football League for sponsorship reasons, was the 16th season since its establishment in 2002. It is the highest amateur association football league in PR China with some semi-professional clubs. 50 clubs were qualified for the second round.

== Promotion and relegation ==
=== From Amateur League ===
Teams promoted to 2017 China League Two

- Dalian Boyang
- Shaanxi Chang'an Athletic
- Shanghai Sunfun
- Jilin Baijia
- Zhenjiang Huasa

== Format ==
The qualification structure is as follows:

- First round: Chinese Football Association subordinate Provincial, City League, champion will advance to the second round.
- Second round: It is divided into eight groups. The top two teams of each group will advance to Third round.
- Third round: The third round is a two-legged elimination. The four winners may be qualify for the 2018 China League Two.
- Play-offs: 2017 League Two 23rd-placed and 24th-placed faces 2017 CAL 5th-placed and 6th-placed for a play-off match. The winner may be qualify for the 2018 China League Two.

== First round ==
China Amateur Football League includes 44 regional leagues. 2016 or 2017 season champion will advance to the second round.

=== Teams qualified for the second round ===
Groups	No	FA	Name	Qualifying method	Position	Remark
North 1 Heilongjiang; Qiqihar	1	Heilongjiang FA	Qiqihaer Zhongjian Bituminous Concrete	2017 China Amateur League (Qiqihar Group)	Winners	Hosts
North 1 Heilongjiang; Qiqihar	2	Heilongjiang FA	Daqing Shuaitong	2017 Daqing Football Super League	Runners-up	
North 1 Heilongjiang; Qiqihar	3	Inner Mongolia FA	Chifeng Hongshan Shire	2016 Nei Mongol Football Super League	Third place	
North 1 Heilongjiang; Qiqihar	4	Inner Mongolia FA	Tongliao Lan'ao	2016 Nei Mongol Football Super League	Winners	
North 1 Heilongjiang; Qiqihar	5	Yanbian FA	Yanbian Beiguo	2017 Yanbian Amateur Super League	Winners	
North 1 Heilongjiang; Qiqihar	6	Liaoning FA	Shenyang Junhui	2017 Liaoning Provincial Amateur League	Winners	
North 2 Liaoning; Shenyang	1	Shenyang FA	Shenyang West Winner	2017 Liaoning Provincial Amateur League	Runners-up	Hosts
North 2 Liaoning; Shenyang	2	Shenyang FA	Shenyang Zhuowei			
North 2 Liaoning; Shenyang	3	Dalian FA	Dalian Longjuanfeng	2016 Dalian City Super League	Runners-up	
North 2 Liaoning; Shenyang	4	Dalian FA	Dalian Ruiheng	2016 Dalian City Super League	Third place	
North 2 Liaoning; Shenyang	5	Tianjin FA	Tianjin Bintaishun	2017 Tianjin Amateur Super League	Winners	
North 2 Liaoning; Shenyang	6	Changchun FA	Changchun Shanghai Yongtai	2017 Changchun Amateur Football League	Fourth place	
North 3 Qinghai; Xining	1	Qinghai FA	Qinghai Zhuangbo	2017 Qinghai Provincial Amateur League	Winners	Hosts
North 3 Qinghai; Xining	2	Qinghai FA	Qinghai Honghua	2017 Qinghai Provincial Amateur League	Runners-up	
North 3 Qinghai; Xining	3	Ningxia FA	Yinchuan Sanyuan	2017 Ningxia Football Super League		
North 3 Qinghai; Xining	4	Xi'an FA	Xi'an Anxinyuan			
North 3 Qinghai; Xining	5	Shannxi FA	Shaanxi Nanzhiqin			
North 3 Qinghai; Xining	6	Zhejiang FA	Zhejiang Dacheng	2016 Zhejiang FA Cup	Third place	
North 4 Shandong; Zibo	1	Shandong FA	Zibo Sunday	2016 Shandong Amateur Super League	Winners	Hosts
North 4 Shandong; Zibo	2	Shandong FA	Zibo Qi Eagle	2016 Shandong Amateur Super League	Runners-up	
North 4 Shandong; Zibo	3	Hebei FA	Hebei Lion	2017 Hebei FA Amateur League	Winners	
North 4 Shandong; Zibo	4	Qingdao FA	Qingdao Red Lions	2017 Qingdao Football Association City League	Runners-up	
North 4 Shandong; Zibo	5	Qingdao FA	Qingdao Kangtine	2017 Qingdao Football Association City League	Third place	
North 4 Shandong; Zibo	6	Shanxi FA	Jinzhong Jinzhihu	2017 Shanxi Provincial FA Cup	Winners	
North 4 Shandong; Zibo	7	Henan FA	Henan Orient Classic	2016 Henan Provincial Amateur League	Winners	Seeded
North 4 Shandong; Zibo	8	Henan FA	Luoyang Tourism Development			
South 1 Zhejiang; Hangzhou	1	Zhejiang FA	Ningbo Yinbo	2016 Zhejiang Provincial Super League	Winners	
South 1 Zhejiang; Hangzhou	2	Zhejiang FA	Hangzhou Wuyue Qiantang	2016 Zhejiang Provincial Super League	Runners-up	Hosts
South 1 Zhejiang; Hangzhou	3	Jiangsu FA	Wuxi Yunlin Yinyang	2016 Jiangsu Provincial Amateur League	Runners-up	Seeded
South 1 Zhejiang; Hangzhou	4	Nanjing FA	Nanjing Shaye	2017 Nanjing City Super League	Winners	
South 1 Zhejiang; Hangzhou	5	Shanghai FA	Shanghai Jiading Boji	2017 Shanghai City Football League	Winners	
South 1 Zhejiang; Hangzhou	6	Fujian FA	Fujian Tianxin	2017 Fujian Provincial Super League	Winners	
South 2 Hubei; Wuhan	1	Wuhan FA	Wuhan Chufeng Heli	2017 Wuhan City Super League	Winners	Hosts
South 2 Hubei; Wuhan	2	Wuhan FA	Wuhan Bofa	2017 Wuhan City Super League	8th	
South 2 Hubei; Wuhan	3	Anhui FA	Anhui Hefei Guiguan	2017 Anhui Provincial Amateur League	Winners	Seeded
South 2 Hubei; Wuhan	4	Hubei FA	Hubei Huachuang	2017 Hubei Provincial Amateur League Play-off	Winners	
South 2 Hubei; Wuhan	5	Chongqing FA	Chongqing Dikai	2017 Chongqing City Super League	6th	
South 2 Hubei; Wuhan	6	Guangzhou FA	Guangzhou Glorious			
South 3 Sichuan; Chengdu	1	Sichuan FA	Sichuan Jiuniu	2016 Sichuan Provincial Football League	Winners	Hosts
South 3 Sichuan; Chengdu	2	Chengdu FA	Sichuan Jinguancheng	2016 Chengdu City Super League	Runners-up	
South 3 Sichuan; Chengdu	3	Guangxi FA	Pingxiang Xiongying	2017 Guangxi Super League	Winners	
South 3 Sichuan; Chengdu	4	Guangxi FA	Liuzhou Ranko	2017 Guangxi Super League	Runners-up	Seeded
South 3 Sichuan; Chengdu	5	Tibet FA	Lhasa Urban Construction Investment			
South 3 Sichuan; Chengdu	6	Kunming FA	Kunming Dongyuan	2017 China Amateur League (Kunming Group)	Winners	
South 4 Guangdong; Huizhou	1	Guangdong FA	Zhanjiang Crazy Wolf	2016-17 Guangdong Provincial Football League	Runners-up	
South 4 Guangdong; Huizhou	2	Guangdong FA	Zhaoqing Hengtai	2016-17 Guangdong Provincial Football League	Winners	Hosts
South 4 Guangdong; Huizhou	3	Shenzhen FA	Shenzhen Pengcheng	2017 Shenzhen City Super League	Winners	
South 4 Guangdong; Huizhou	4	Shenzhen FA	Shenzhen Xingmeng Yangguang	2017 Shenzhen City Super League	Runners-up	
South 4 Guangdong; Huizhou	5	Xiamen FA	Xiamen Tianyu	2016 Xiamen City Amateur League	Fourth place	
South 4 Guangdong; Huizhou	6	Xiamen FA	Xiamen Lianchuang Century	2016 Xiamen City Amateur League	Winners	

Source: fa.org.cn

== Second round ==
=== North 1 ===
==== Group A ====
Team	Pld	W	D	L	GF	GA	GD	Pts	
Qiqihaer Zhongjian Bituminous Concrete (Q)	2	2	0	0	6	0	+6	6	Third round
Tongliao Lan'ao	2	0	1	1	0	3	-3	1	
Shenyang Junhui	2	0	1	1	0	3	-3	1	

Rules for classification: 1) Points; 2) Head-to-head points; 3) Head-to-head goal difference; 4) Head-to-head goals scored; 5) Goal difference; 6) Goals scored; 7) Disciplinary points (1 point for each yellow card, 3 points for each red card); 8) Draw

5 August 2017	Shenyang Junhui	0–3	Qiqihaer Zhongjian Bituminous Concrete	Qiqihar University Football Stadium, Qiqihar
16:00			Liu Ye 55'; Zhang Shuai 63'; Zhang Guoshun 89'

6 August 2017	Tongliao Lan'ao	0–0	Shenyang Junhui	Qiqihar University Football Stadium, Qiqihar
16:00

7 August 2017	Qiqihaer Zhongjian Bituminous Concrete	3–0	Tongliao Lan'ao	Qiqihar University Football Stadium, Qiqihar
16:00	Ye Hui 32'; Liu Ye 37', 39' (pen.)

==== Group B ====
Team	Pld	W	D	L	GF	GA	GD	Pts	
Yanbian Beiguo (Q, P)	2	2	0	0	7	0	+7	6	Third round
Chifeng Hongshan Shire	2	1	0	1	2	5	-3	3	
Daqing Shuaitong	2	0	0	2	1	5	-4	0	

Rules for classification: 1) Points; 2) Head-to-head points; 3) Head-to-head goal difference; 4) Head-to-head goals scored; 5) Goal difference; 6) Goals scored; 7) Disciplinary points (1 point for each yellow card, 3 points for each red card); 8) Draw

5 August 2017	Daqing Shuaitong	1–2	Chifeng Hongshan Shire	Qiqihar Medical University Football Stadium, Qiqihar
16:00	Zhao Liang 21' (pen.)		Leng Bing 64'; Liu Peng 86'

6 August 2017	Yanbian Beiguo	3–0	Daqing Shuaitong	Qiqihar Medical University Football Stadium, Qiqihar
16:00	Li Xun 44'; Cui Xudong 65'; Song Jian 67'

7 August 2017	Chifeng Hongshan Shire	0–4	Yanbian Beiguo	Qiqihar Medical University Football Stadium, Qiqihar
16:00			Cui Xudong 31', 45'; Ma Jiajun 55'; Li Xun 59'

==== Final ====
9 August 2017	Qiqihaer Zhongjian Bituminous Concrete	2–0	Yanbian Beiguo	Qiqihar University Football Stadium, Qiqihar
16:00	Liu Ye 37'; Zhang Liangxi 76'

=== North 2 ===
==== Group A ====
Team	Pld	W	D	L	GF	GA	GD	Pts	
Dalian Ruiheng (Q)	2	2	0	0	4	2	+2	6	Third round
Tianjin Bintaishun	2	1	0	1	3	2	+1	3	
Shenyang West Winner	2	0	0	2	1	4	-3	0	

Rules for classification: 1) Points; 2) Head-to-head points; 3) Head-to-head goal difference; 4) Head-to-head goals scored; 5) Goal difference; 6) Goals scored; 7) Disciplinary points (1 point for each yellow card, 3 points for each red card); 8) Draw

19 August 2017	Shenyang West Winner	1–2	Dalian Ruiheng	Shenyang Urban Construction University Football Field 1, Shenyang
14:00	Wang Xubin 79'		Zou Jun 17', 45'

20 August 2017	Tianjin Bintaishun	2–0	Shenyang West Winner	Shenyang Urban Construction University Football Field 2, Shenyang
15:30	Jin Yongsheng 23', 88'

21 August 2017	Dalian Ruiheng	2–1	Tianjin Bintaishun	Shenyang Urban Construction University Stadium, Shenyang
15:30	Liu Zhuang 5'; Li Peng 28'		Mu Yutan 38' (pen.)

==== Group B ====
Team	Pld	W	D	L	GF	GA	GD	Pts	
Dalian Longjuanfeng (Q)	2	2	0	0	10	3	+7	6	Third round
Shenyang Zhuowei	2	1	0	1	4	3	+1	3	
Changchun Shanghai Yongtai	2	0	0	2	2	10	-8	0	

Rules for classification: 1) Points; 2) Head-to-head points; 3) Head-to-head goal difference; 4) Head-to-head goals scored; 5) Goal difference; 6) Goals scored; 7) Disciplinary points (1 point for each yellow card, 3 points for each red card); 8) Draw

19 August 2017	Dalian Longjuanfeng	3–1	Shenyang Zhuowei	Shenyang Urban Construction University Football Field 2, Shenyang
14:00	Xian Ming 11'; Jiang Tao 45'; Wang Fei 86'		Dong Kaining 81'

20 August 2017	Changchun Shanghai Yongtai	2–7	Dalian Longjuanfeng	Shenyang Urban Construction University Football Field 1, Shenyang
15:30	Lin Hao 25'; Li Yong 32'		Yang Ou 12'; Jin Yang 18', 56'; Liu Peng 45'; Xian Ming 53'; Liang Shuai 71', 90'

21 August 2017	Shenyang Zhuowei	3–0	Changchun Shanghai Yongtai	Shenyang Urban Construction University Football Field 2, Shenyang
15:30	Lei Yucheng 40', 58'; Ren Kenan 52'

==== Final ====
23 August 2017	Dalian Ruiheng	2–5	Dalian Longjuanfeng	Shenyang Urban Construction University Football Stadium, Shenyang
17:00	Liang Ruifu 12' (pen.); Wang Lei 70'		41'; Liu Peng 46'; Liang Shuai 61', 68'; Wang Fei 87'

=== North 3 ===
==== Group A ====
Team	Pld	W	D	L	GF	GA	GD	Pts	
Shaanxi Nanzhiqin (Q)	2	2	0	0	7	4	+3	6	Third round
Yinchuan Sanyuan	2	1	0	1	5	3	+2	3	
Qinghai Honghua	2	0	0	2	2	7	-5	0	

Rules for classification: 1) Points; 2) Head-to-head points; 3) Head-to-head goal difference; 4) Head-to-head goals scored; 5) Goal difference; 6) Goals scored; 7) Disciplinary points (1 point for each yellow card, 3 points for each red card); 8) Draw

19 August 2017	Yinchuan Sanyuan	2–3	Shaanxi Nanzhiqin	Qinghai Duoba National Highland Sports Training Base Field, Xining
15:00	Zhang Bin 21'; Xie Tao 85' (pen.)		Xin Yuan 20' (pen.); Wang Ziyi 51', 90'

20 August 2017	Qinghai Honghua	0–3	Yinchuan Sanyuan	Qinghai Duoba National Highland Sports Training Base Field, Xining
18:00			Xiao Rui 17'; Zhang Bin 20'; Tian Chengliang 90+2'

21 August 2017	Shaanxi Nanzhiqin	4–2	Qinghai Honghua	Qinghai Duoba National Highland Sports Training Base Field, Xining
15:00	Chen Weizhi 7', 16'; Chen Kaiqiang 20'; Xin Yuan 52'		Zhang Chen 25', 42'

==== Group B ====
Team	Pld	W	D	L	GF	GA	GD	Pts	
Qinghai Zhuangbo (Q)	2	2	0	0	9	0	+9	6	Third round
Zhejiang Dacheng	2	1	0	1	2	3	-1	3	
Xi'an Anxinyuan	2	0	0	2	0	8	-8	0	

Rules for classification: 1) Points; 2) Head-to-head points; 3) Head-to-head goal difference; 4) Head-to-head goals scored; 5) Goal difference; 6) Goals scored; 7) Disciplinary points (1 point for each yellow card, 3 points for each red card); 8) Draw

19 August 2017	Zhejiang Dacheng	0–3	Qinghai Zhuangbo	Qinghai Duoba National Highland Sports Training Base Field, Xining
18:00			Geng Deyang 10'; Cao Boyuan 83'; Xiao Lei 87'

20 August 2017	Xi'an Anxinyuan	0–2	Zhejiang Dacheng	Qinghai Duoba National Highland Sports Training Base Field, Xining
15:00			Liu Shun 77'; Yu Jiaji 81' (pen.)

21 August 2017	Qinghai Zhuangbo	6–0	Xi'an Anxinyuan	Qinghai Duoba National Highland Sports Training Base Field, Xining
18:00	Niu Xiucheng 38'; Zhang Wen 44'; Li Chenchao 64'; Gao Shunhang 68', 78'; Xiao Lei 84'

==== Final ====
23 August 2017	Shaanxi Nanzhiqin	0–6	Qinghai Zhuangbo	Qinghai Duoba National Highland Sports Training Base Field, Xining
15:00			Cao Boyuan 8' (pen.), 19', 76'; Li Chenchao 35', 78'; Geng Deyang 70'

=== North 4 ===
==== Group A ====
Team	Pld	W	D	L	GF	GA	GD	Pts	
Qingdao Kangtine (Q)	3	2	1	0	10	2	+8	7	Third round
Hebei Lion	3	1	2	0	7	2	+5	5	
Zibo Qi Eagle	3	1	1	1	4	4	0	4	
Henan Orient Classic	3	0	0	3	2	15	-13	0	

Rules for classification: 1) Points; 2) Head-to-head points; 3) Head-to-head goal difference; 4) Head-to-head goals scored; 5) Goal difference; 6) Goals scored; 7) Disciplinary points (1 point for each yellow card, 3 points for each red card); 8) Draw

19 August 2017	Hebei Lion	5–0	Henan Orient Classic	Zibo Sports Center Stadium, Zibo
15:00	Zhao Xinlei 10', 38'; Chen Weilu 27'; Wang Cong 60' (pen.); Liu Zhentao 89'

19 August 2017	Zibo Qi Eagle	0–2	Qingdao Kangtine	Qidu Cultural Sports City, Zibo
15:00			Pan Zhilin 53', 65'

20 August 2017	Qingdao Kangtine	1–1	Hebei Lion	Zibo Sports Center Stadium, Zibo
15:00	Tian Yong 33'		Xu Zhongguo 23'

20 August 2017	Henan Orient Classic	1–3	Zibo Qi Eagle	Qidu Cultural Sports City, Zibo
15:00	Lin Yuchen 90'		Wang Simeng 26', 63'; Yang Zengqi 34'

21 August 2017	Zibo Qi Eagle	1–1	Hebei Lion	Zibo Sports Center Stadium, Zibo
15:00	Gao Teng 90' (pen.)		Zhao Xinlei 41'

21 August 2017	Henan Orient Classic	1–7	Qingdao Kangtine	Qidu Cultural Sports City, Zibo
15:00	Li Chen 34'		Tian Yong 18', 35', 58', 65', 68', 80'; Meng Taiyi 45' (pen.)

==== Group B ====
Team	Pld	W	D	L	GF	GA	GD	Pts	
Zibo Sunday (Q, C, P)	3	3	0	0	8	0	+8	9	Third round
Qingdao Red Lions	3	2	0	1	11	2	+9	6	
Luoyang Tourism Development	3	1	0	2	4	5	-1	3	
Jinzhong Jinzhihu	3	0	0	3	0	16	-16	0	

Rules for classification: 1) Points; 2) Head-to-head points; 3) Head-to-head goal difference; 4) Head-to-head goals scored; 5) Goal difference; 6) Goals scored; 7) Disciplinary points (1 point for each yellow card, 3 points for each red card); 8) Draw

19 August 2017	Zibo Sunday	1–0	Qingdao Red Lions	Zibo Sports Center Stadium, Zibo
17:00	Zhang Fengyu 56'

19 August 2017	Jinzhong Jinzhihu	0–3	Luoyang Tourism Development	Qidu Cultural Sports City, Zibo
17:00			Liu Yuan 45'; 62' (pen.); Sun Zhendong 90+2'

20 August 2017	Luoyang Tourism Development	0–3	Zibo Sunday	Zibo Sports Center Stadium, Zibo
17:00			Liu Mengyang 30'; Li En 61'; Yuan Bo 73'

20 August 2017	Qingdao Red Lions	9–0	Jinzhong Jinzhihu	Qidu Cultural Sports City, Zibo
17:00	Zhang Yang 8', 10', 75'; Zhong Hua 32', 48'; Wan Chao 51'; Wang Hao 61'; Ma Jun 81'; Liu Yi 82'

21 August 2017	Jinzhong Jinzhihu	0–4	Zibo Sunday	Zibo Sports Center Stadium, Zibo
17:00			Shen Tong 5'; Wang Yang 23'; Xu Shaohua 25'; Cheng Bo 83'

21 August 2017	Qingdao Red Lions	2–1	Luoyang Tourism Development	Qidu Cultural Sports City, Zibo
17:00	Ma Jun 47', 49'		Li Qiang 30' (pen.)

==== Final ====
23 August 2017	Qingdao Kangtine	1–3	Zibo Sunday	Zibo Sports Center Stadium, Zibo
16:00	Jin Ping 30' (pen.)		Liu Mengyang 16'; Ze Xiaoyang 49'; Shen Tong 66'

=== South 1 ===
==== Group A ====
Team	Pld	W	D	L	GF	GA	GD	Pts	
Nanjing Shaye (Q)	2	2	0	0	5	3	+2	6	Third round
Shanghai Jiading Boji	2	0	1	1	3	4	-1	1	
Hangzhou Wuyue Qiantang	2	0	1	1	2	3	-1	1	

Rules for classification: 1) Points; 2) Head-to-head points; 3) Head-to-head goal difference; 4) Head-to-head goals scored; 5) Goal difference; 6) Goals scored; 7) Disciplinary points (1 point for each yellow card, 3 points for each red card); 8) Draw

12 August 2017	Nanjing Shaye	3–2	Shanghai Jiading Boji	Hangzhou Sports Center, Hangzhou
16:00	Zhang Tao 6'; Zhao Zeyu 51'; Jiang Shichao 83'		Li Cheng 33' (pen.); Xi Sunbin 90+3'

13 August 2017	Hangzhou Wuyue Qiantang	1–2	Nanjing Shaye	Hangzhou Sports Center, Hangzhou
16:00	Wang Fei 24'		Song Yue 28'; Jiang Tao 90+4'

14 August 2017	Shanghai Jiading Boji	1–1	Hangzhou Wuyue Qiantang	Hangzhou Sports Center, Hangzhou
16:00	Li Cheng 24'		Wang Fei 70'

==== Group B ====
Team	Pld	W	D	L	GF	GA	GD	Pts	
Fujian Tianxin (Q, P)	2	2	0	0	4	0	+4	6	Third round
Ningbo Yinbo	2	1	0	1	2	3	-1	3	
Wuxi Yunlin Yinyang	2	0	0	2	1	4	-3	0	

Rules for classification: 1) Points; 2) Head-to-head points; 3) Head-to-head goal difference; 4) Head-to-head goals scored; 5) Goal difference; 6) Goals scored; 7) Disciplinary points (1 point for each yellow card, 3 points for each red card); 8) Draw

12 August 2017	Wuxi Yunlin Yinyang	0–2	Fujian Tianxin	Xiacheng District Sports Center, Hangzhou
16:00			Chen Liansheng 7', 78' (pen.)

13 August 2017	Ningbo Yinbo	2–1	Wuxi Yunlin Yinyang	Xiacheng District Sports Center, Hangzhou
16:00	Yao Zhen 17'; Wang Ke 61'		Xu Jinghui 59'

14 August 2017	Fujian Tianxin	2–0	Ningbo Yinbo	Xiacheng District Sports Center, Hangzhou
16:00	Parhat 37'; Zhao Kun 77'

==== Final ====
16 August 2017	Nanjing Shaye	1–4	Fujian Tianxin	Hangzhou Sports Center, Hangzhou
16:00	Jiang Tao 18' (pen.)		Xia Deqiang 19'; Sun Fenghao 28'; Deng Li 70'; Parhat 84'

=== South 2 ===
==== Group A ====
Team	Pld	W	D	L	GF	GA	GD	Pts	
Wuhan Chufeng Heli (Q)	2	2	0	0	4	0	+4	6	Third round
Guangzhou Glorious	2	1	0	1	2	1	+1	3	
Hubei Huachuang	2	0	0	2	0	5	-5	0	

Rules for classification: 1) Points; 2) Head-to-head points; 3) Head-to-head goal difference; 4) Head-to-head goals scored; 5) Goal difference; 6) Goals scored; 7) Disciplinary points (1 point for each yellow card, 3 points for each red card); 8) Draw

12 August 2017	Hubei Huachuang	0–3	Wuhan Chufeng Heli	Tazi Lake Sports Centre Field 1, Wuhan
17:00			Zhu Wei 14'; Jiang Kun 37'; Deng Sheng 38' (pen.)

13 August 2017	Guangzhou Glorious	2–0	Hubei Huachuang	Tazi Lake Sports Centre Field 1, Wuhan
17:00	Lin Zefeng 63'; Xie Zifeng 77'

14 August 2017	Wuhan Chufeng Heli	1–0	Guangzhou Glorious	Tazi Lake Sports Centre Field 1, Wuhan
17:00	Qi Chongxi 72'

==== Group B ====
Team	Pld	W	D	L	GF	GA	GD	Pts	
Anhui Hefei Guiguan (Q, P)	2	2	0	0	8	2	+6	6	Third round
Chongqing Dikai	2	1	0	1	5	7	-2	3	
Wuhan Bofa	2	0	0	2	2	6	-4	0	

Rules for classification: 1) Points; 2) Head-to-head points; 3) Head-to-head goal difference; 4) Head-to-head goals scored; 5) Goal difference; 6) Goals scored; 7) Disciplinary points (1 point for each yellow card, 3 points for each red card); 8) Draw

12 August 2017	Wuhan Bofa	2–3	Chongqing Dikai	Tazi Lake Sports Centre Field 3, Wuhan
17:00	Li Xin 15' (pen.); Fang Wei 61'		Wang Huaqing 44', 58'; Zeng Weijie 83'

13 August 2017	Anhui Hefei Guiguan	3–0	Wuhan Bofa	Tazi Lake Sports Centre Field 3, Wuhan
17:00	Zhang Tianhan 46', 83', 85'

14 August 2017	Chongqing Dikai	2–5	Anhui Hefei Guiguan	Tazi Lake Sports Centre Field 3, Wuhan
17:00	Zeng Weijie 73'; Ji Shushan 83'		Wang Lichun 12', 70'; Zhang Depeng 24'; Wang Bojun 53'; Wang Jun 89' (pen.)

==== Final ====
16 August 2017	Wuhan Chufeng Heli	0–0 (4–5 p)	Anhui Hefei Guiguan	Tazi Lake Sports Centre Field 1, Wuhan
17:00

=== South 3 ===
==== Group A ====
Team	Pld	W	D	L	GF	GA	GD	Pts	
Sichuan Jiuniu (Q, P)	2	2	0	0	11	1	+10	6	Third round
Kunming Dongyuan	2	1	0	1	6	2	+4	3	
Pingxiang Xiongying	2	0	0	2	0	14	-14	0	

Rules for classification: 1) Points; 2) Head-to-head points; 3) Head-to-head goal difference; 4) Head-to-head goals scored; 5) Goal difference; 6) Goals scored; 7) Disciplinary points (1 point for each yellow card, 3 points for each red card); 8) Draw

12 August 2017	Pingxiang Xiongying	0–9	Sichuan Jiuniu	Chengdu Blades Football Base Field 1, Chengdu
16:00			Xue Fei 8', 10', 20'; Zhang Tianhao 21' (o.g.); Pan Yefan 28' (o.g.); Yang Wenfeng 42', 65'; Yu Di 76'; Gong Qiule 78'

13 August 2017	Kunming Dongyuan	5–0	Pingxiang Xiongying	Chengdu Blades Football Base Field 1, Chengdu
16:00	Zhang Dong 35'; Shen Jixin 44'; Zhang Liang 53'; Liang Tuo 59'; Yang Bin 77'

14 August 2017	Sichuan Jiuniu	2–1	Kunming Dongyuan	Chengdu Blades Football Base Field 1, Chengdu
16:00	Zhao Jun 44'; Yang Zong 78'		Liang Tuo 59'

==== Group B ====
Team	Pld	W	D	L	GF	GA	GD	Pts	
Lhasa Urban Construction Investment (Q)	2	2	0	0	8	0	+8	6	Third round
Liuzhou Ranko	2	0	1	1	1	4	-3	1	
Sichuan Jinguancheng	2	0	1	1	1	6	-5	1	

Rules for classification: 1) Points; 2) Head-to-head points; 3) Head-to-head goal difference; 4) Head-to-head goals scored; 5) Goal difference; 6) Goals scored; 7) Disciplinary points (1 point for each yellow card, 3 points for each red card); 8) Draw

12 August 2017	Sichuan Jinguancheng	0–5	Lhasa Urban Construction Investment	Chengdu Blades Football Base Field 2, Chengdu
16:00			Ma Xiaopeng 37'; Wu Haiqing 54', 70'; Huang Yuangqiang 82'; Yu Liang 87'

13 August 2017	Liuzhou Ranko	1–1	Sichuan Jinguancheng	Chengdu Blades Football Base Field 2, Chengdu
16:00	Wei Xinkuan 80'		Huang Shan 48'

14 August 2017	Lhasa Urban Construction Investment	3–0	Liuzhou Ranko	Chengdu Blades Football Base Field 2, Chengdu
16:00	Xue Yuzhen 9' (o.g.); Liu Zijun 22'; Xie Weijun 45'

==== Final ====
16 August 2017	Sichuan Jiuniu	0–0 (4–2 p)	Lhasa Urban Construction Investment	Chengdu Blades Football Base Field 1, Chengdu
16:00

=== South 4 ===
==== Group A ====
Team	Pld	W	D	L	GF	GA	GD	Pts	
Zhaoqing Hengtai (Q)	2	2	0	0	7	1	+6	6	Third round
Shenzhen Xingmeng Yangguang	2	1	0	1	7	2	+5	3	
Xiamen Tianyu	2	0	0	2	0	11	-11	0	

Rules for classification: 1) Points; 2) Head-to-head points; 3) Head-to-head goal difference; 4) Head-to-head goals scored; 5) Goal difference; 6) Goals scored; 7) Disciplinary points (1 point for each yellow card, 3 points for each red card); 8) Draw

5 August 2017	Shenzhen Xingmeng Yangguang	1–2	Zhaoqing Hengtai	Huizhou Olympic Stadium, Huizhou
17:00	Li Jiayi 51'		33'; Ou Jiajie 41'

6 August 2017	Xiamen Tianyu	0–6	Shenzhen Xingmeng Yangguang	Huizhou Olympic Stadium Outer Field, Huizhou
17:00			Li Jiayi 8' (pen.), 17' (pen.), 34', 63'; Yao Jialin 23', 55'

7 August 2017	Zhaoqing Hengtai	5–0	Xiamen Tianyu	Huizhou Olympic Stadium, Huizhou
17:00	Chen Siyu 7', 40'; Shen Yichong 12'; Lin Zhaoming 26'; Chen Qian 84'

==== Group B ====
Team	Pld	W	D	L	GF	GA	GD	Pts	
Shenzhen Pengcheng (Q, P)	2	2	0	0	5	2	+3	6	Third round
Xiamen Lianchuang Century	2	1	0	1	2	2	0	3	
Zhanjiang Crazy Wolf	2	0	0	2	1	4	-3	0	

Rules for classification: 1) Points; 2) Head-to-head points; 3) Head-to-head goal difference; 4) Head-to-head goals scored; 5) Goal difference; 6) Goals scored; 7) Disciplinary points (1 point for each yellow card, 3 points for each red card); 8) Draw

5 August 2017	Shenzhen Pengcheng	3–1	Zhanjiang Crazy Wolf	Huizhou Olympic Stadium Outer Field, Huizhou
17:00	Wu Weian 13', 63'; Zhang Jian 70'		Chen Zhiheng 60'

6 August 2017	Xiamen Lianchuang Century	1–2	Shenzhen Pengcheng	Huizhou Olympic Stadium, Huizhou
17:00	Ke Yifei 81'		Wu Weian 69', 73' (pen.)

7 August 2017	Zhanjiang Crazy Wolf	0–1	Xiamen Lianchuang Century	Huizhou Olympic Stadium Outer Field, Huizhou
17:00			Chen Jianlong 90+1'

==== Final ====
9 August 2017	Zhaoqing Hengtai	2–2 (2–4 p)	Shenzhen Pengcheng	Huizhou Olympic Stadium, Huizhou
17:00	Huang Chengshuai 8'; Lin Zhaoming 25' (pen.)		Li Yisong 59'; Wu Weian 83'
	Penalties
	Lin Zhaoming (penalty scored); Lin Leiyi (penalty scored); Cai Haojian (penalty missed); Shen Yichong (penalty missed)		Li Haifeng (penalty scored); Zhu Haiqiang (penalty scored); Chi Jixiang (penalty scored); Zhang Suozhi (penalty scored)

=== Teams qualified for the Third round ===
North		South	
Seeded	Unseeded	Seeded	Unseeded
Qiqihaer Zhongjian Bituminous Concrete; Dalian Longjuanfeng; Qinghai Zhuangbo; Zibo Sunday	Yanbian Beiguo; Dalian Ruiheng; Shaanxi Nanzhiqin; Qingdao Kangtine	Fujian Tianxin; Anhui Hefei Guiguan; Sichuan Jiuniu; Shenzhen Pengcheng	Nanjing Shaye; Wuhan Chufeng Heli; Lhasa Urban Construction Investment; Zhaoqing Hengtai

== Third round ==
=== Clubs Locations ===
Location of teams in 2017 China Amateur Football League R16

=== Round of 16 ===
Team 1	Agg.	Team 2	1st leg	2nd leg
North
Dalian Ruiheng	0–4	Qiqihaer Zhongjian Bituminous Concrete	0–3	0–1
Yanbian Beiguo	2–2 (5–3 p)	Dalian Longjuanfeng	1–1	1–1
Shaanxi Nanzhiqin	0–9	Zibo Sunday	0–5	0–4
Qingdao Kangtine	2–3	Qinghai Zhuangbo	2–2	0–1
South
Wuhan Chufeng Heli	2–3	Fujian Tianxin	1–1	1–2
Nanjing Shaye	0–1	Anhui Hefei Guiguan	0–0	0–1
Lhasa Urban Construction Investment	4–3	Shenzhen Pengcheng	3–1	1–2
Zhaoqing Hengtai	4–3	Sichuan Jiuniu	2–1	2–2

==== Matches ====
9 September 2017
15:00

Dalian Ruiheng	0–3	Qiqihaer Zhongjian Bituminous Concrete
		Zhang Shuai 6', 70'; Zheng Lei 88'

Jinzhou Stadium, Dalian
Referee: Dai Yige
16 September 2017
14:00

Qiqihaer Zhongjian Bituminous Concrete	1–0	Dalian Ruiheng
Liu Ye 65' (pen.)

Qiqihar University Football Stadium, Qiqihar

Qiqihaer Zhongjian Bituminous Concrete won 4–0 on aggregate.

9 September 2017
15:00

Yanbian Beiguo	1–1	Dalian Longjuanfeng
Cui Xudong 44'		Liu Peng 27'

Hunchun People's Stadium, Hunchun
Referee: Zhu Wenbin
17 September 2017
15:00

Dalian Longjuanfeng	1–1	Yanbian Beiguo
Guo Hui 59' (pen.)		Cui Xudong 41'
Penalties
	3–5

Jinzhou Stadium, Dalian
Referee: Chen Gang

2–2 on aggregate. Yanbian Beiguo won 5–3 on penalties.

9 September 2017
16:30

Shaanxi Nanzhiqin	0–5	Zibo Sunday
		Li Song 38', 68'; Yuan Bo 73'; Xu Shaohua 82'; Feng Yang 87'

Ankang Vocational and Technical College Football Field, Ankang
16 September 2017
16:00

Zibo Sunday	4–0	Shaanxi Nanzhiqin
Xu Shaohua 40', 57'; Li Song 45'; Gao Fei 67'

Zibo Sports Center Stadium, Zibo

Zibo Sunday won 9–0 on aggregate.

11 September 2017
16:00

Qingdao Kangtine	2–2	Qinghai Zhuangbo
Tian Yong 57'; Wang Yao 66'		Geng Deyang 13'; Zhou Peng 31'

Qingdao Tiantai Stadium, Qingdao
Referee: Liu Shaocheng
16 September 2017
15:00

Qinghai Zhuangbo	1–0	Qingdao Kangtine
Geng Deyang 16'

Qinghai Haihu Sports Center Stadium, Xining

Qinghai Zhuangbo won 3–2 on aggregate.

10 September 2017
16:00

Wuhan Chufeng Heli	1–1	Fujian Tianxin
He Lei 6'		Liu Qiming 65'

Tazi Lake Sports Centre, Wuhan
Referee: Liu Wei
17 September 2017
16:00

Fujian Tianxin	2–1	Wuhan Chufeng Heli
Tian Riliang 54'; Chen Yongran 90+3'		Huang Lei 58' (pen.)

Fujian Normal University Football Stadium, Fuzhou

Fujian Tianxin won 3–2 on aggregate.

10 September 2017
16:30

Nanjing Shaye	0–0	Anhui Hefei Guiguan

Wutaishan Stadium, Nanjing
Referee: Liang Songshang
17 September 2017
16:30

Anhui Hefei Guiguan	1–0	Nanjing Shaye
Zhang Depeng 63'

Hefei Olympic Sports Center Stadium Outer Field, Hefei

Anhui Hefei Guiguan won 1–0 on aggregate.

10 September 2017
16:30

Lhasa Urban Construction Investment	3–1	Shenzhen Pengcheng
Wu Haiqing 55' (pen.), 59', 83'		Zhou Jun 88'

Lhasa Cultural Sports Center Stadium, Lhasa
17 September 2017
16:00

Shenzhen Pengcheng	2–1	Lhasa Urban Construction Investment
Li Yisong 2'; Wei Huiping 76' (pen.)		Liu Teng 18'

Bao'an Stadium, Shenzhen

Lhasa Urban Construction Investment won 4–3 on aggregate.

10 September 2017
16:00

Zhaoqing Hengtai	2–1	Sichuan Jiuniu
Lin Zhaoming 48' (pen.); Huang Chengshuai 52'		Liao Delun 42' (o.g.)

Century Lotus Stadium, Foshan
17 September 2017
16:00

Sichuan Jiuniu	2–2	Zhaoqing Hengtai
Ruan Jun 16'; Du Wenhui 75'		Cai Haojian 10', 78'

Chengdu Longquanyi Football Stadium, Chengdu

Zhaoqing Hengtai won 4–3 on aggregate.

=== Quarter-finals ===
Team 1	Agg.	Team 2	1st leg	2nd leg
Fujian Tianxin	1–3	Qiqihaer Zhongjian Bituminous Concrete	1–3	0–0
Yanbian Beiguo	3–3 (3–4 p)	Anhui Hefei Guiguan	2–1	1–2
Lhasa Urban Construction Investment	0–1	Zibo Sunday	0–0	0–1
Qinghai Zhuangbo	0–0 (3–5 p)	Zhaoqing Hengtai	0–0	0–0

==== Matches ====
23 September 2017
15:30

Fujian Tianxin	1–3	Qiqihaer Zhongjian Bituminous Concrete
Chen Liansheng 40'		Wang Ke 82'; Ye Hui 88'; Zhang Shuai 90+2'

Fujian Normal University Football Stadium, Fuzhou
Referee: Liang Caiwei
30 September 2017
14:00

Qiqihaer Zhongjian Bituminous Concrete	0–0	Fujian Tianxin

Qiqihar University Football Stadium, Qiqihar
Referee: Dai Yige

Qiqihaer Zhongjian Bituminous Concrete won 3–1 on aggregate.

23 September 2017
15:00

Yanbian Beiguo	2–1	Anhui Hefei Guiguan
Li Xun 1'; Cui Xudong 75'		Wang Lichun 13'

Hunchun People's Stadium, Hunchun
Referee: Li Zheng
30 September 2017
15:30

Anhui Hefei Guiguan	2–1	Yanbian Beiguo
Zhong Kai 38'; Zhang Depeng 88'		Yang Yuchao 7'
Penalties
	4–3

Hefei Olympic Sports Center Stadium Outer Field, Hefei

3–3 on aggregate. Anhui Hefei Guiguan won 4–3 on penalties.

24 September 2017
16:30

Lhasa Urban Construction Investment	0–0	Zibo Sunday

Lhasa Cultural Sports Center Stadium, Lhasa
30 September 2017
16:30

Zibo Sunday	1–0	Lhasa Urban Construction Investment
Zhang Fengyu 58' (pen.)

Zibo Sports Center Stadium, Zibo

Zibo Sunday won 1–0 on aggregate.

24 September 2017
15:00

Qinghai Zhuangbo	0–0	Zhaoqing Hengtai

Qinghai Haihu Sports Center Stadium, Xining
1 October 2017
15:30

Zhaoqing Hengtai	0–0	Qinghai Zhuangbo
Penalties
	5–3

Century Lotus Stadium, Foshan

0–0 on aggregate. Zhaoqing Hengtai won 5–3 on penalties.

=== 5th–8th place semifinals ===
9 October 2017
10:00

Fujian Tianxin	0–1	Yanbian Beiguo
		Cui Xudong 74'

Chengdu FA Training Base, Chengdu
Referee: Chen Gang
9 October 2017
15:00

Lhasa Urban Construction Investment	w/o	Qinghai Zhuangbo

Chengdu FA Training Base, Chengdu

=== 5th–6th place ===
12 October 2017
15:00

Yanbian Beiguo	2–0	Lhasa Urban Construction Investment
Piao Wanzhe 23'; Yang Yuchao 26'

Chengdu FA Training Base, Chengdu

2017 CAL 5th-placed and 6th-placed faces 2017 League Two 23rd-placed and 24th-placed for a play-off match. The winner may be qualify for the 2018 China League Two. See 2017 China League Two#Relegation play-off.

=== Semi-finals ===
Team 1	Agg.	Team 2	1st leg	2nd leg
Qiqihaer Zhongjian Bituminous Concrete	1–2	Anhui Hefei Guiguan	1–1	0–1
Zibo Sunday	2–1	Zhaoqing Hengtai	0–1	2–0

==== Matches ====
7 October 2017
14:00

Qiqihaer Zhongjian Bituminous Concrete	1–1	Anhui Hefei Guiguan
Zhang Shuai 78'		Zhang Depeng 89'

Qiqihar University Football Stadium, Qiqihar
14 October 2017
14:30

Anhui Hefei Guiguan	1–0	Qiqihaer Zhongjian Bituminous Concrete
Zhang Depeng 16'

Hefei Olympic Sports Center Stadium, Hefei

Anhui Hefei Guiguan won 2–1 on aggregate.

8 October 2017
15:30

Zibo Sunday	0–1	Zhaoqing Hengtai
		Zhong Yecheng 55'

Zibo Sports Center Stadium, Zibo
15 October 2017
15:30

Zhaoqing Hengtai	0–2	Zibo Sunday
		Yuan Bo 41'; Zhang Fengyu 88' (pen.)

Century Lotus Stadium, Foshan

Zibo Sunday won 2–1 on aggregate.

=== Third-Place Match ===
Team 1	Agg.	Team 2	1st leg	2nd leg
Zhaoqing Hengtai	2–3	Qiqihaer Zhongjian Bituminous Concrete	1–1	1–2

21 October 2017
15:30

Zhaoqing Hengtai	1–1	Qiqihaer Zhongjian Bituminous Concrete
Chen Qian 24'		Zhang Liangxi 77'

Century Lotus Stadium, Foshan
28 October 2017
14:00

Qiqihaer Zhongjian Bituminous Concrete	2–1	Zhaoqing Hengtai
Bian Feng 40'; Lü Mingqi 81'		Lin Zhaoming 43'

Qiqihar University Football Stadium, Qiqihar

Qiqihaer Zhongjian Bituminous Concrete won 3–2 on aggregate.

=== Final Match ===
Team 1	Agg.	Team 2	1st leg	2nd leg
Anhui Hefei Guiguan	1–2	Zibo Sunday	0–1	1–1

25 October 2017
15:30

Anhui Hefei Guiguan	0–1	Zibo Sunday
		Tian Xin 33'

Zibo Sports Center Stadium, Zibo
Referee: Zhu Wenbin
29 October 2017
15:30

Zibo Sunday	1–1	Anhui Hefei Guiguan
Xu Shaohua 68'		Zhang Depeng 81' (pen.)

Zibo Sports Center Stadium, Zibo

Zibo Sunday won 2–1 on aggregate.

Notes

1. Anhui Hefei Guiguan abdicated to play at their home stadium.
