= Wang Bojun =

Chinese association football player

Personal information
- Date of birth: 2 March 1991 (age 35)
- Height: 1.83 m (6 ft 0 in)
- Position: Midfielder

Team information
- Current team: Jiangxi Beidamen
- Number: 20

Senior career*
Years	Team	Apps	(Gls)
- Nanjing Qianbao
2015	Hubei Huachuang		
2016	Suzhou Zhongyuan		
2017–2018	Anhui Hefei Guiguan		
2018–	Jiangxi Beidamen	61	(0)
- * Club domestic league appearances and goals as of 14:01, 24 August 2021 (UTC)

Wang Bojun (Chinese: 王博君; born 2 March 1991) is a Chinese footballer currently playing as a midfielder for Jiangxi Beidamen.

== Career statistics ==
=== Club ===
As of 24 August 2021.

Club	Season	League			Cup		Other		Total	
Club	Season	Division	Apps	Goals	Apps	Goals	Apps	Goals	Apps	Goals
Hubei Huachuang	2015	–			2 (Note: Appearances in the Chinese FA Cup)	0	0	0	2	0
Suzhou Zhongyuan	2016	–			1	0	0	0	1	0
Anhui Hefei Guiguan	2017	CFA Amateur League	–		0	0	0	0	0	0
Anhui Hefei Guiguan	2018	China League Two	14	0	2	0	0	0	16	0
Anhui Hefei Guiguan	Total		14	0	2	0	0	0	16	0
Jiangxi Beidamen	2018	China League Two	11	0	0	0	1 (Note: Appearances in the China League Two playoffs)	0	12	0
Jiangxi Beidamen	2019	China League Two	25	0	2	0	4	0	31	0
Jiangxi Beidamen	2020	China League One	10	0	0	0	2 (Note: Appearances in the China League One relegation playoffs)	0	12	0
Jiangxi Beidamen	2021	China League One	15	0	0	0	0	0	15	0
Jiangxi Beidamen	Total		61	0	2	0	7	0	70	0
Career total			4	0	1	0	0	0	5	0
