= Zhang Depeng =

Chinese association football player

Personal information
- Date of birth: 9 October 1989 (age 37)
- Place of birth: Yingkou, Liaoning, China
- Height: 1.82 m (6 ft 0 in)
- Position: Midfielder

Youth career
- –2011: Dalian Shide

Senior career*
Years	Team	Apps	(Gls)
2008	Dalian Shide Siwu		(1)
2012–2015	Dalian Tornado		
2016	Suzhou Zhongyuan		
2017–2018	Anhui Hefei Guiguan	11	(2)
2018–2019	Yanbian Beiguo	26	(3)
2019	Dalian Chanjoy	1	(0)
- * Club domestic league appearances and goals

Zhang Depeng (Chinese: 张德鹏; born 9 October 1989) is a Chinese former footballer.

== Career statistics ==
=== Club ===
Club	Season	League			Cup		Continental		Other		Total	
Club	Season	Division	Apps	Goals	Apps	Goals	Apps	Goals	Apps	Goals	Apps	Goals
Suzhou Zhongyuan	2016	–			1 (Note: Appearances in the Chinese FA Cup)	0	–		–		1	0
Anhui Hefei Guiguan	2018	China League Two	11	2	2	0	–		0	0	13	2
Yanbian Beiguo	2018	China League Two	13	1	0	0	–		1 (Note: Appearances in the China League Two playoffs)	0	14	1
Yanbian Beiguo	2019	China League Two	13	2	2	0	–		0	0	15	2
Yanbian Beiguo	Total		26	3	2	0	0	0	1	0	29	3
Dalian Chanjoy	2019	China League Two	1	0	0	0	–		0	0	1	0
Career total			38	5	5	0	0	0	1	0	44	5
