= Chen Liansheng =

Chinese football player

Chen Liansheng 陈连晟
Personal information
- Date of birth: February 21, 1991 (age 35)
- Place of birth: Dalian, Liaoning, China
- Height: 1.75 m (5 ft 9 in)
- Position: Midfielder

Team information
- Current team: Jilin Baijia
- Number: 14

Youth career
- Changchun Yatai

Senior career*
Years	Team	Apps	(Gls)
2010–2015	Changchun Yatai	10	(1)
2014	→ Jiangxi Liansheng (loan)	11	(0)
2017	Fujian Tianxin		
2018–	Jilin Baijia	50	(1)
- * Club domestic league appearances and goals as of 12 October 2019

Chen Liansheng (Chinese: 陈连晟; pinyin: Chén Liánshèng, born 21 February 1991) is a Chinese football player who currently plays for China League Two side Jilin Baijia.

== Club career ==
Chen started his professional football career in 2010 when he was promoted to Chinese Super League side Changchun Yatai's first team. He didn't play for the club until 23 June 2012. He made his senior debut against Hangzhou Greentown, coming on as a substitute for Zhang Wenzhao in the 84th minute. He scored his first goal in the 88th minute which ensured Changchun beat Hangzhou 3–2. His first senior start came on 4 days later, playing against Hohhot Dongjin in the third round of 2012 Chinese FA Cup. He assisted Marko Ljubinković's first goal in the 40th minute. Chen played 4 league matches (all coming off the bench) in the 2012 league season.

On 8 July 2014, Chen was loaned to China League Two side Jiangxi Liansheng until 31 December 2014.

In February 2018, Chen transferred to China League Two side Jilin Baijia.

== Career statistics ==
Statistics accurate as of match played 12 October 2019.

Club performance			League		Cup		League Cup		Continental		Total	
Season	Club	League	Apps	Goals	Apps	Goals	Apps	Goals	Apps	Goals	Apps	Goals
China PR			League		FA Cup		CSL Cup		Asia		Total	
2010	Changchun Yatai	Chinese Super League	0	0	-		-		0	0	0	0
2011	Changchun Yatai	Chinese Super League	0	0	0	0	-		-		0	0
2012	Changchun Yatai	Chinese Super League	4	1	1	0	-		-		5	1
2013	Changchun Yatai	Chinese Super League	4	0	2	0	-		-		6	0
2014	Jiangxi Liansheng	China League Two	11	0	0	0	-		-		11	0
2015	Changchun Yatai	Chinese Super League	2	0	1	0	-		-		3	0
2017	Fujian Tianxin	Amateur League	-	-	-		-		-		-	-
2018	Jilin Baijia	China League Two	24	0	1	0	-		-		25	0
2019	Jilin Baijia	China League Two	26	1	4	0	-		-		30	1
Total	China PR		71	2	9	0	0	0	0	0	80	2
