= Cai Haojian =

Chinese footballer

Cai Haojian 蔡浩健
Personal information
- Date of birth: 24 October 1995 (age 31)
- Place of birth: Jieyang, Guangdong, China
- Height: 1.70 m (5 ft 7 in)
- Position: Midfielder

Team information
- Current team: Hubei Chufeng United
- Number: 19

Youth career
- Guangzhou Youth
- 2013–2017: South China University of Technology

Senior career*
Years	Team	Apps	(Gls)
2016–2017	Zhaoqing Hengtai		
2018–	Guangzhou R&F	3	(0)
2019	→ Hubei Chufeng United (loan)	14	(2)
- * Club domestic league appearances and goals as of 31 December 2020

Cai Haojian (Chinese: 蔡浩健; pinyin: Cài Hàojiàn; born 24 October 1995) is a Chinese footballer who plays as a midfielder for Hubei Chufeng United in the China League Two.

== Career ==
Cai Haojian entered South China University of Technology in 2013 after declining an invitation from Chinese Super League side Guangzhou Evergrande. He played for amateur club Zhaoqing Hengtai between 2015 and 2017 and helped the club win a qualification for promoting to China League Two in the 2017 China Amateur Football League.

Cai signed his first professional contract with Chinese Super League side Guangzhou R&F on 17 November 2017. He was promoted to the first team squad by Dragan Stojković in the 2018 season. On 2 March 2018, he made his senior debut in a 5–4 away win against city rival Guangzhou Evergrande Taobao, coming on as a substitute for Xiao Zhi in the 90th minute.

== Career statistics ==
As of 31 December 2020.

Appearances and goals by club, season and competition
Club	Season	League			National Cup		Continental		Other		Total	
Club	Season	Division	Apps	Goals	Apps	Goals	Apps	Goals	Apps	Goals	Apps	Goals
Zhaoqing Hengtai	2016	China Amateur Football League	-		1	0	-		-		1	0
Zhaoqing Hengtai	2017	China Amateur Football League	-		1	0	-		-		1	0
Zhaoqing Hengtai	Total		-		2	0	0	0	0	0	2	0
Guangzhou R&F	2018	Chinese Super League	3	0	1	0	-		-		4	0
Hubei Chufeng United (loan)	2019	China League Two	14	2	0	0	-		-		14	2
Total	China PR		17	2	3	0	0	0	0	0	20	2
