= Fujian Ningde Funing F.C. =

Fujian Ningde Funing
- Full name: Fujian Ningde Funing Football Club 福建宁德福宁足球俱乐部
- Founded: 2005; 20 years ago
- Dissolved: 2020; 5 years ago
Home colours	Away colours

Fujian Ningde Funing Football Club (Chinese: 福建宁德福宁足球俱乐部) was a professional Chinese football club. The team was based in Ningde, Fujian.

== History ==
The club was formed by Shen Wence in 2005 as an amateur football club. It took part in amateur football league in Fuzhou for years. On January 16, 2017, the club officially converted into a professional team when it aimed for the qualification to the China League Two. In the 2017 season Zhao Tuqiang was appointed as the head coach. After winning the champion of 2017 Fujian Football Super League, the club enter into the second round of CAL, and managed to qualify for the third round. In the knockout stage, the club beat Wuhan Chufeng Heli, but after being defeated by Qiqihaer Zhongjian Bituminous Concrete and Yanbian Beiguo, the club eventually ranked 7th in the 2017 CAL. However, the club was substituted to promote to the China League Two, due to the withdrawal of Zhaoqing Hengtai, Chengdu Qbao and Shanghai JuJu Sports, as well as Qiqihaer Zhongjian Bituminous Concrete and Lhasa Urban Construction Investment being ineligible for promotion. On March 5, 2019, the club switched its home ground from Fuzhou, Fujian to Jinjiang, Fujian.

On February 3, 2020, the club was disqualified for 2020 China League Two after they failed to submit the salary and bonus confirmation form. On May 15 the club announced that it had solved its financial problems, moved to Ningde and renamed Fujian Ningde Funing F.C., but it failed to regain the entrance to 2020 China League Two and was soon dissolved afterwards.

== Managerial history ==
- (China) Zhao Tuqiang (2017–2020)

== Results ==
All-time league rankings

- As of the end of 2019 season.

Year	Div	Pld	W	D	L	GF	GA	GD	Pts	Pos.	FA Cup	Super Cup	AFC	Att./G	Stadium
2017	4									7	DNQ	DNQ	DNQ		Fujian Normal University Sports Center Stadium
2018	3	28	12	8	8	33	25	8	44	7	R2	DNQ	DNQ	1,853	Fujian Olympic Sports Center Stadium; Fujian Normal University Sports Center Stadium; Haixia Olympic Center Stadium
2019	3	30	13	5	12	32	42	-6	44^{1}	13	R1	DNQ	DNQ		Quanzhou College of Technology Stadium

- ^1 In group stage.

Key

	China top division
	China second division
	China third division
	China fourth division
W	Winners
RU	Runners-up
3	Third place
	Relegated

- Pld = Played
- W = Games won
- D = Games drawn
- L = Games lost
- F = Goals for
- A = Goals against
- Pts = Points
- Pos = Final position
- DNQ = Did not qualify
- DNE = Did not enter
- NH = Not Held
- – = Does Not Exist
- R1 = Round 1
- R2 = Round 2
- R3 = Round 3
- R4 = Round 4
- F = Final
- SF = Semi-finals
- QF = Quarter-finals
- R16 = Round of 16
- Group = Group stage
- GS2 = Second Group stage
- QR1 = First Qualifying Round
- QR2 = Second Qualifying Round
- QR3 = Third Qualifying Round
