= Huang Jingfeng =

Chinese association football player

Personal information
- Date of birth: 1 January 2000 (age 26)
- Height: 1.72 m (5 ft 8 in)
- Position: Midfielder

Team information
- Current team: Wenzhou Ouyan

Youth career
- –2021: Zhejiang Professional

Senior career*
Years	Team	Apps	(Gls)
2021–2022	Zhejiang Professional	5	(0)
2022–	Wenzhou Ouyan	0	(0)
- * Club domestic league appearances and goals as of 14:01, 15 December 2022 (UTC)

Huang Jingfeng (Chinese: 黄景峰; born 1 January 2000) is a Chinese footballer currently playing as a midfielder for Wenzhou Ouyan.

== Club career ==
In 2021 Huang Jingfeng would be promoted to the senior team of Zhejiang and would make his debut on 20 May 2021 in a league game against Zibo Cuju in a 2-1 victory. He would be a squad player as the club gained promotion to the top tier at the end of the 2021 campaign. Huang would join lower league side Wenzhou Ouyan on 9 August 2022.

== Career statistics ==
As of 15 December 2022.

Club	Season	League			Cup		Continental		Other		Total	
Club	Season	Division	Apps	Goals	Apps	Goals	Apps	Goals	Apps	Goals	Apps	Goals
Zhejiang Professional	2021	China League One	5	0	2	0	–		0 (Note: Appearance(s) in CSL Relegation play-offs)	0	7	0
Career total			5	0	2	0	0	0	0	0	7	0
