= Heilongjiang Crane City F.C. =

Chinese football club

Heilongjiang Crane City Heīlóngjīang Qíhè Dàdì 黑龙江齐鹤大地
- Full name: Heilongjiang Crane City Football Club 黑龙江齐鹤大地足球俱乐部
- Founded: 2008; 18 years ago
- Dissolved: 2019
- League: Chinese Champions League
- 2018: CMCL, 12th

Heilongjiang Crane City Football Club (Chinese: 黑龙江齐鹤大地足球俱乐部) is an amateur Chinese football club. The team is based in Qiqihar, Heilongjiang. They played at the 15,000-capacity Hecheng Stadium in Qiqihar.

== History ==
Qiqihaer Northern Wolf Football Club was established in 2008. In 2013, it was taken over and renamed Qiqihaer Zhongjian Bituminous Concrete F.C.

In 2017, they participated in the 2017 China Amateur Football League, and achieved 3rd place---a place eligible for promotion to China League Two, after beating Zhaoqing Hengtai by a total score of 3–2. The club then changed its name to Qiqihaer Hecheng Yiyang F.C. However, they were eventually denied promotion.

Before the 2018 Chinese Champions League season, they changed their name once again, to Heilongjiang Crane City F.C. on 24 April 2018. In the round of 16 knock-out stage, they were eliminated by the eventual champions, Taizhou Yuanda, and was ranked 12th. Although eligible for promotion due to vacancies created by multiple teams failing to register for 2019 China League Two, they announced their withdrawal from all Chinese football leagues in January 2019, and dissolved soon after.

== Name history ==
- 2008–2013 Qiqihaer Northern Wolf F.C. 齐齐哈尔北狼
- 2013–2017 Qiqihaer Zhongjian Bituminous Concrete F.C. 齐齐哈尔中建商砼
- 2017–2018 Qiqihaer Hecheng Yiyang F.C. 齐齐哈尔鹤城翼阳
- 2018–2019 Heilongjiang Crane City F.C. 黑龙江齐鹤大地

== Results ==
All-time league rankings

As of the end of 2018 season.

| Year | Div | Pld | W | D | L | GF | GA | GD | Pts | Pos. | FA Cup | Super Cup | AFC | Att./G | Stadium |
|---|---|---|---|---|---|---|---|---|---|---|---|---|---|---|---|
| 2013 | 4 | | | | | | | | | 8^{1} | DNQ | DNQ | DNQ | | |
| 2017 | 4 | | | | | | | | | 3 | DNQ | DNQ | DNQ | | Qiqihar University Stadium |
| 2018 | 4 | | | | | | | | | 12 | DNQ | DNQ | DNQ | | Harbin ICE Sports Center |

- ^1 in North Group.

Key

| | China top division |
| | China second division |
| | China third division |
| | China fourth division |
| W | Winners |
| RU | Runners-up |
| 3 | Third place |
| | Relegated |

- Pld = Played
- W = Games won
- D = Games drawn
- L = Games lost
- F = Goals for
- A = Goals against
- Pts = Points
- Pos = Final position
- DNQ = Did not qualify
- DNE = Did not enter
- NH = Not Held
- WD = Withdrawal
- – = Does Not Exist
- R1 = Round 1
- R2 = Round 2
- R3 = Round 3
- R4 = Round 4
- F = Final
- SF = Semi-finals
- QF = Quarter-finals
- R16 = Round of 16
- Group = Group stage
- GS2 = Second Group stage
- QR1 = First Qualifying Round
- QR2 = Second Qualifying Round
- QR3 = Third Qualifying Round
