= Dalian Longjuanfeng F.C. =

Chinese football club

Dalian Longjuanfeng 大连龙卷风
- Full name: Dalian Longjuanfeng Football Club 大连龙卷风足球俱乐部
- Founded: 2004; 22 years ago
- Ground: Dalian, Liaoning
- League: China Amateur Football League
- 2017: Amateur League, 9th

Dalian Longjuanfeng Football Club (Chinese: 大连龙卷风足球俱乐部) is an amateur Chinese football club that currently participates in the China Amateur Football League. The team is based in Dalian, Liaoning.

== History ==
Dalian Longjuanfeng F.C. was established in 2004. It first entered the final stage of China Amateur Football League in 2011 and was crowned as champions.

After finishing 5th in the 2015 China Amateur Football League season, the club sold their place in the 2016 China Amateur Football League and entire first-team to Dalian Boyang.

The following 2017 season saw the club rebuilt itself with a team assembled from their former reserve squad and managed to reach 9th place in the 2017 China Amateur Football League national finals.

== Results ==
All-time league rankings

As of the end of 2017 season.

Year	Div	Pld	W	D	L	GF	GA	GD	Pts	Pos.	FA Cup	Super Cup	AFC	Att./G	Stadium
2011	4									W	DNQ	DNQ	DNQ		
2012	4									5	R1	DNQ	DNQ		
2013	4										R1	DNQ	DNQ		
2014	4									5	R1	DNQ	DNQ		
2015	4									5	R1	DNQ	DNQ		
2017	4									9	DNQ	DNQ	DNQ		

Key

	China top division
	China second division
	China third division
	China fourth division
W	Winners
RU	Runners-up
3	Third place
	Relegated

- Pld = Played
- W = Games won
- D = Games drawn
- L = Games lost
- F = Goals for
- A = Goals against
- Pts = Points
- Pos = Final position
- DNQ = Did not qualify
- DNE = Did not enter
- NH = Not Held
- – = Does Not Exist
- R1 = Round 1
- R2 = Round 2
- R3 = Round 3
- R4 = Round 4
- F = Final
- SF = Semi-finals
- QF = Quarter-finals
- R16 = Round of 16
- Group = Group stage
- GS2 = Second Group stage
- QR1 = First Qualifying Round
- QR2 = Second Qualifying Round
- QR3 = Third Qualifying Round

== Honours ==
- China Amateur Football League: 2011
