= Qiqihar University =

Provincial public university in Qiqihar, Heilongjiang, China

- 齐齐哈尔大学
- Type: Public
- Established: 1953
- President: Ma Liqun
- Academic staff: 1,347
- Administrative staff: 500
- Students: 29,000
- Undergraduates: 23,097
- Postgraduates: 1,028
- Location: Qiqihar, Heilongjiang, China
- Website: qqhru.edu.cn

Qiqihar University (QQHRU; Chinese: 齐齐哈尔大学; pinyin: Qíqíhār Dàxué) is a provincial public university in Qiqihar City, western Heilongjiang, northeastern China. It is affiliated with the Province of Heilongjiang and funded by the provincial government.

In 1996, Qiqihar University was established through the merger of the then Qiqihar Light Industry College (founded in 1952) and the then Qiqihar Normal College (founded in 1958). After that, Heilongjiang Provincial Commercial and Trade School, Heilongjiang Provincial Chemical Industry School, and Keshan Normal College had been successively merged into the school.

It is beside Labor Lake in the city of Qiqihar. Covering an area of 1.25 square kilometers with a building area of 720,000 square meters, it is nicknamed 'The Round Lake University' and has been awarded titles such as 'Garden University' and 'Provincial Model Unit' by the Heilongjiang Provincial Committee of the CPC and the People's Government of Heilongjiang Province.

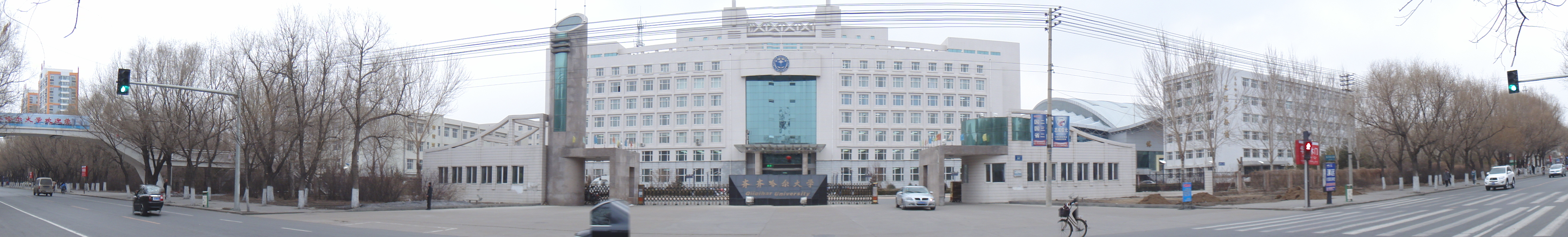
Qiqihar University Western Gate Panorama

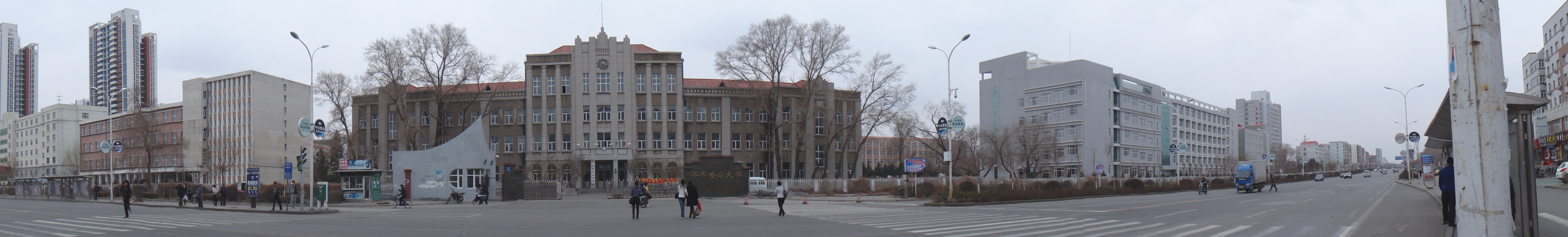
Qiqihar University East Gate Panorama

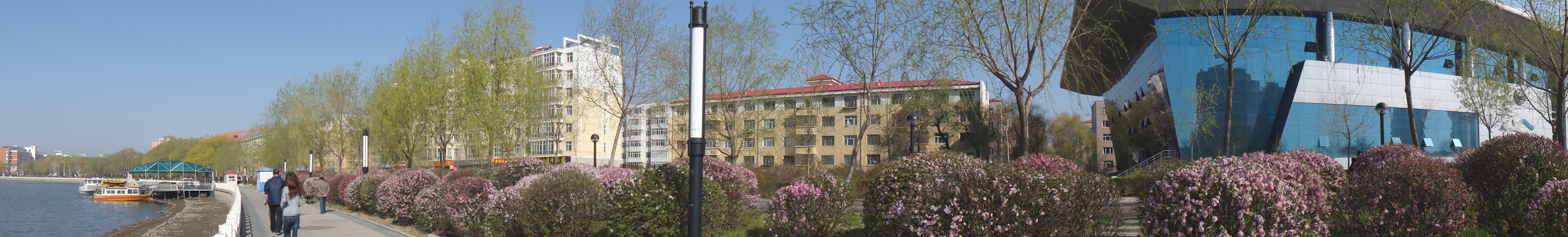
Qiqihar University Labor Lake Panorama
