= Qiqihar Medical University =

Medical college in Qiqihar, Heilongjiang, China

- 齐齐哈尔医学院
- Type: Public
- Established: 1946
- President: Liu Jicheng
- Faculty: 3,453
- Students: 15,000
- Location: Qiqihar, Heilongjiang, China
- Colors
- Website: www.qmu.edu.cn

Qiqihar Medical University (Chinese: 齐齐哈尔医学院; pinyin: Qíqíhār Yīxué Yuàn) is a provincial public undergraduate medical college in Qiqihar City, western Heilongjiang, northeastern China. It is affiliated with the province of Heilongjiang and funded by the provincial government. Despite the English name, the college has not yet be granted university status by the Ministry of Education of China.
