= Zibo Cuju F.C. =

Chinese football club

Zibo Cuju 淄博蹴鞠
- Full name: Zibo Cuju Football Club 淄博蹴鞠足球俱乐部
- Founded: June 1982; 44 years ago
- Dissolved: 29 March 2023; 3 years ago

Zibo Cuju Football Club (Chinese: 淄博蹴鞠足球俱乐部) is a defunct professional Chinese football club that participated in the China League One. The team was based in Zibo. The club was dissolved in March 2023.

== History ==
Zibo Sunday was founded in June 1982 inspired by the 1982 FIFA World Cup. As the founders of the team mainly played football together on Sunday, they used Sunday as the club's name. They officially registered as an amateur club on 18 July 1996. Zibo Sunday finished the third place in the 2011 AFC Vision China Championship and won qualification for the 2012 Chinese FA Cup, which they lost to China League Two club Dongguan Nancheng 3–0. On 30 September 2017, Zibo Sunday won promotion to China League Two after they advanced to semi-final of 2017 China Amateur Football League by beating Lhasa Urban Construction Investment 1–0, and eventually, winning the entire Championship by beating Anhui Hefei Guiguan in the final. After competing in 2018 China League Two and ending up in a mid-table finish, Zibo Sunday F.C. changed their name to Zibo Cuju F.C. in January 2019, stressing the significance of Zibo being the home of Cuju, a form of proto-football sport in ancient China.

== Name history ==
- 1982–2018 Zibo Sunday S.C. 淄博星期天
- 2019–2022 Zibo Cuju F.C. 淄博蹴鞠

== Managerial history ==
- (China) Liu Mengyang (2015)
- (China) Zhang Chonglai (2016)
- (China) Liu Meng (2017)
- (China) Hou Zhiqiang (2018–2020)
- (South Korea) Park Chul (2021)
- (China) Huang Hongyi (2021–2022)

== Results ==
All-time league rankings

As of the end of 2019 season.

Year	Div	Pld	W	D	L	GF	GA	GD	Pts	Pos.	FA Cup	Super Cup	AFC	Other		Att./G	Stadium
2011	4									DNQ^{1}	DNQ	DNQ	DNQ	VCC ^{2}	3		
2012	4									DNQ^{1}	R1	DNQ	DNQ	VCC ^{2}	3		
2013	4									12	R1	DNQ	DNQ				
2014	4									DNQ^{1}	R1	DNQ	DNQ				
2015	4									DNQ^{1}	QR	DNQ	DNQ				
2016	4									Group	DNQ	DNQ	DNQ				
2017	4									W	DNQ	DNQ	DNQ				Zibo Sports Center Stadium
2018	3	28	12	5	11	38	32	6	41	19	R2	DNQ	DNQ			1,485	Zibo Sports Center Stadium
2019	3	30	22	3	5	60	13	47	69^{3}	7	R4	DNQ	DNQ				Zibo Sports Center Stadium
2020	3	10	7	1	2	14	8	6	22	RU	DNQ	DNQ	DNQ				Zibo Sports Center Stadium
2021	2	34	10	9	15	32	52	-20	39	11	R4	DNQ	DNQ				Zibo Sports Center Stadium
2022	2	34	11	6	17	37	53	-17	33^{4}	15	R3	DNQ	DNQ				Zibo Sports Center Stadium

- ^1 Did not qualify to the final stage. ^2 AFC Vision China Championship. ^3 In group stage. ^4 Zibo Cuju had 6 points deducted due to unpaid salaries on 23 November 2022.

Key

	China top division
	China second division
	China third division
	China fourth division
W	Winners
RU	Runners-up
3	Third place
	Relegated

- Pld = Played
- W = Games won
- D = Games drawn
- L = Games lost
- F = Goals for
- A = Goals against
- Pts = Points
- Pos = Final position
- DNQ = Did not qualify
- DNE = Did not enter
- NH = Not Held
- – = Does Not Exist
- R1 = Round 1
- R2 = Round 2
- R3 = Round 3
- R4 = Round 4
- F = Final
- SF = Semi-finals
- QF = Quarter-finals
- R16 = Round of 16
- Group = Group stage
- GS2 = Second Group stage
- QR1 = First Qualifying Round
- QR2 = Second Qualifying Round
- QR3 = Third Qualifying Round
