= Yanbian Beiguo F.C. =

Chinese football club

Yanbian Beiguo Yánbiān Běiguó 延边北国
- Full name: Yanbian Beiguo Football Club 延边北国足球俱乐部
- Founded: 12 December 2016; 9 years ago
- Dissolved: 2020

Yanbian Beiguo Football Club (Chinese: 延边北国足球俱乐部) was a Chinese football club that participated in China League Two. The team was based in Hunchun and it used 18,000-capacity Hunchun People's Stadium of Hunchun as their home stadium.

On 4 February 2020, Yanbian Beiguo was disqualified for 2020 China League Two due to its failure to hand in the salary and bonus confirmation form before the deadline.

== Managerial history ==
- (China) Huang Yong (2017)
- (South Korea) Wang Sun-jae (2018)
- (South Korea) Choi Jin-han (2018)
- (Serbia) Nebojša Maksimović (2019)
- (China) Jin Qing (2019)

== Results ==
All-time league rankings

- As of the end of 2019 season.

| Year | Div | Pld | W | D | L | GF | GA | GD | Pts | Pos. | FA Cup | Super Cup | AFC | Att./G | Stadium |
|---|---|---|---|---|---|---|---|---|---|---|---|---|---|---|---|
| 2017 | 4 | | | | | | | | | 5 | DNQ | DNQ | DNQ | | Hunchun People's Stadium |
| 2018 | 3 | 28 | 8 | 4 | 16 | 31 | 50 | -19 | 28 | 23 | R4 | DNQ | DNQ | 1,653 | Hunchun People's Stadium |
| 2019 | 3 | 30 | 9 | 5 | 16 | 33 | 57 | -24 | 32^{1} | 18 | R2 | DNQ | DNQ | | Hunchun People's Stadium |

- ^1 In group stage.

Key

| | China top division |
| | China second division |
| | China third division |
| | China fourth division |
| W | Winners |
| RU | Runners-up |
| 3 | Third place |
| | Relegated |

- Pld = Played
- W = Games won
- D = Games drawn
- L = Games lost
- F = Goals for
- A = Goals against
- Pts = Points
- Pos = Final position
- DNQ = Did not qualify
- DNE = Did not enter
- NH = Not held
- WD = Withdrawal
- – = Does not exist
- R1 = Round 1
- R2 = Round 2
- R3 = Round 3
- R4 = Round 4
- F = Final
- SF = Semi-finals
- QF = Quarter-finals
- R16 = Round of 16
- Group = Group stage
- GS2 = Second Group stage
- QR1 = First Qualifying Round
- QR2 = Second Qualifying Round
- QR3 = Third Qualifying Round
