= Zhaoqing Hengtai F.C. =

Chinese football club

Zhaoqing Hengtai 肇庆恒泰
- Full name: Zhaoqing Hengtai Football Club 肇庆市恒泰足球俱乐部
- Founded: 2012; 14 years ago
- Ground: Century Lotus Stadium, Foshan
- Owner(s): Guangzhou Yifeng Real Estate Development Co., Ltd
- Chairman: Yang Haowen (杨浩文)
- Manager: Peng Jinbo (彭锦波)
- League: Chinese Champions League
- 2017: Amateur League, 4th

Zhaoqing Hengtai Football Club (Chinese: 肇庆市恒泰足球俱乐部) is an amateur Chinese football club that currently participates in the Chinese Champions League. The team is based in Zhaoqing and currently uses Century Lotus Stadium of Foshan as their home stadium.

== History ==
Zhaoqing Hengtai was founded in 2012 by retired footballer and college students of Guangdong. They advanced to the Chinese FA Cup for the first time in 2014 and were knocked out in the second round when they lost to China League One club Hunan Billows in the penalty shoot-out. On 1 October 2017, Zhaoqing Hengtai won promotion to China League Two after which they advanced to semi-finals of the 2017 China Amateur Football League by beating Qinghai Zhuangbo in the penalty shoot-out. However, they gave up the opportunity to turn professional and remained at the amateur league.

== Results ==
All-time league rankings

As of the end of 2017 season.

Year	Div	Pld	W	D	L	GF	GA	GD	Pts	Pos.	FA Cup	Super Cup	AFC	Att./G	Stadium
2014	4									6	R2	DNQ	DNQ		
2015	4									WD	R1	DNQ	DNQ		
2016	4									Group	R2	DNQ	DNQ		
2017	4									4	R1	DNQ	DNQ		Century Lotus Stadium

Key

	China top division
	China second division
	China third division
	China fourth division
W	Winners
RU	Runners-up
3	Third place
	Relegated

- Pld = Played
- W = Games won
- D = Games drawn
- L = Games lost
- F = Goals for
- A = Goals against
- Pts = Points
- Pos = Final position
- DNQ = Did not qualify
- DNE = Did not enter
- NH = Not Held
- WD = Withdrawal
- – = Does Not Exist
- R1 = Round 1
- R2 = Round 2
- R3 = Round 3
- R4 = Round 4
- F = Final
- SF = Semi-finals
- QF = Quarter-finals
- R16 = Round of 16
- Group = Group stage
- GS2 = Second Group stage
- QR1 = First Qualifying Round
- QR2 = Second Qualifying Round
- QR3 = Third Qualifying Round
