= Wuhan Jiangcheng F.C. =

Chinese football club

Wuhan Jiangcheng 武汉江城
- Full name: Wuhan Jiangcheng Football Club 武汉江城足球俱乐部
- Founded: July 2000; 25 years ago
- Ground: Hankou Cultural Sports Centre
- Capacity: 20,000
- Manager: Zhang Hong
- 2023: China League Two, 11th of 16 (withdrew)

Wuhan Jiangcheng Football Club (Chinese: 武汉江城足球俱乐部; lit. 'Wuhan River City F.C.') is a Chinese football club based in Wuhan, Hubei, that last competed in China League Two. Wuhan Jiangcheng plays its home matches at the Hankou Cultural Sports Centre, located within Jianghan District.

== History ==
Wuhan Huachuang F.C. was founded in 2000, and changed their name to Hubei Huachuang F.C. in 2015. The club participated in Chinese Champions League in 2021 and was promoted to China League Two. In 2022, the club changed its name to Wuhan Jiangcheng F.C.

== Name history ==
- 2000–2015 Wuhan Huachuang F.C. 武汉华创
- 2016–2021 Hubei Huachuang F.C. 湖北华创
- 2022– Wuhan Jiangcheng F.C. 武汉江城
