= 2019 China League Two =

2019 season of second division Chinese association football

China League Two
- Season: 2019
- Champions: Shenyang Urban
- Promoted: Shenyang Urban; Chengdu Better City; Taizhou Yuanda; Suzhou Dongwu; Jiangxi Liansheng; Sichuan Jiuniu; Kunshan F.C.
- Relegated: Shanxi Metropolis; Yunnan Kunlu
- Matches: 510
- Goals: 1,285 (2.52 per match)
- Top goalscorer: Ma Xiaolei (23 goals)
- Biggest home win: Taizhou Yuanda 7–0 Xi'an Daxing Chongde (25 May 2019)
- Biggest away win: Inner Mongolia Caoshangfei 0–9 Zibo Cuju (24 August 2019)
- Highest scoring: Inner Mongolia Caoshangfei 0–9 Zibo Cuju (24 August 2019)
- Longest winning run: 14 matches Shenyang Urban
- Longest unbeaten run: 19 matches Chengdu Better City; Hebei Aoli Jingying; Shenyang Urban
- Longest winless run: 24 matches Yunnan Kunlu
- Longest losing run: 10 matches Yunnan Kunlu
- Highest attendance: 18,325; Chengdu Better City 3–1 Suzhou Dongwu (21 September 2019)
- Lowest attendance: 56; Jilin Baijia 2–0 Qingdao Red Lions (15 September 2019)
- All statistics correct as of 27 October 2019.

The 2019 Chinese Football Association Division Two League season is the 30th season since its establishment in 1989. The league was expanded to 32 teams, with 16 teams in North Group and 16 teams in South Group.

== Team changes ==
=== To League Two ===
Team relegated from 2018 China League One

- Zhejiang Yiteng
- ~~Dalian Transcendence~~

Teams promoted from 2018 Chinese Champions League

- Taizhou Yuanda
- Chengdu Better City
- Hubei Chufeng United
- Hangzhou Wuyue Qiantang
- Lhasa Urban Construction Investment
- Nanjing Shaye
- Shanxi Metropolis
- Yunnan Kunlu
- Wuhan Shangwen
- Guangxi Baoyun
- Qingdao Red Lions
- Xi'an Daxing Chongde
- Shenzhen Xinqiao (withdrew)
- ~~Heilongjiang Crane City~~

=== From League Two ===
Teams promoted to 2019 China League One

- Sichuan Longfor
- Nantong Zhiyun
- Shaanxi Chang'an Athletic

Dissolved entries

- ~~Anhui Hefei Guiguan~~
- ~~Hainan Boying~~
- ~~Shanghai Sunfun~~
- ~~Shenyang Dongjin~~
- ~~Shenzhen Ledman~~
- ~~Yunnan Flying Tigers~~

=== Name changes ===
- Zhenjiang Huasa F.C. moved to Kunshan and changed their name to Kunshan F.C. in December 2018.
- Baotou Nanjiao F.C. changed their name to Inner Mongolia Caoshangfei F.C. in January 2019.
- Wuhan Shangwen F.C. changed their name to Wuhan Three Towns F.C. in January 2019.
- Dalian Boyoung F.C. changed their name to Dalian Chanjoy F.C. in January 2019.
- Zibo Sunday F.C. changed their name to Zibo Cuju F.C. in January 2019.
- Hebei Elite F.C. changed their name to Hebei Aoli Jingying F.C. in February 2019.

== Clubs ==
=== Stadiums and Locations ===
Groups	Team	Head coach	City	Stadium	Capacity	2018 season
North	Jiangsu Yancheng Dingli	(China) Huang Yong	Yancheng	Dafeng Olympic Sports Centre	10,000	4th
North	Shenyang Urban	(China) Yu Ming	Shenyang	Shenyang Urban Construction University Stadium	12,000	6th
North	Qingdao Jonoon	(Serbia) Dragoslav Milenković	Qingdao	Qingdao Tiantai Stadium	20,525	8th
North	Yinchuan Helanshan	(China) Zhao Changhong	Yinchuan	Helan Mountain Stadium	39,872	9th
North	Yinchuan Helanshan	(China) Zhao Changhong	Yinchuan	Wuzhong Yellow River Cultural and Sports Center	N/A	9th
North	Hebei Aoli Jingying	(Brazil) Vila	Qinhuangdao	Qinhuangdao Olympic Sports Centre Stadium	33,572	11th
North	Jilin Baijia	(Serbia) Zoran Kitanoski	Changchun	Development Area Stadium	25,000	14th
North	Baoding Yingli ETS	(China) Fan Yuhong	Baoding	Hebei University Stadium	20,000	15th
North	Dalian Chanjoy	(China) Zhao Faqing	Dalian	Jinzhou Stadium	30,775	17th
North	Zibo Cuju	(China) Hou Zhiqiang	Zibo	Zibo Sports Center Stadium	45,000	19th
North	Beijing BIT	(Spain) Asier Eizaguirre	Beijing	BIT Eastern Athletic Field	5,000	21st
North	Yanbian Beiguo	(China) Jin Qing	Wangqing	Wangqing People's Stadium	N/A	23rd
North	Inner Mongolia Caoshangfei	(Serbia) Branko Božović	Baotou	Baotou Olympic Sports Centre Stadium	40,545	25th
North	Taizhou Yuanda ^{P}	(China) Yin Tiesheng	Taizhou	Taixing Sports Center Stadium	8,000	CMCL, 1st
North	Shanxi Metropolis ^{P}	(Chinese Taipei) Vom Ca-nhum	Taiyuan	Shanxi Sports Centre Stadium	62,000	CMCL, 7th
North	Qingdao Red Lions ^{P}	(Slovenia) Tomaž Kavčič	Qingdao	Jimo Powerise District Sports Centre Stadium	15,000	CMCL, 15th
North	Qingdao Red Lions ^{P}	(Slovenia) Tomaž Kavčič	Qingdao	Laixi Sports Centre Stadium	N/A	CMCL, 15th
North	Xi'an Daxing Chongde ^{P}	(Serbia) Bojan Pavlović	Xi'an	Northwestern Polytechnical University (Chang'an Campus) Stadium	N/A	CMCL, 16th
South	Zhejiang Yiteng ^{R}	(England) Giles Stille	Shaoxing	China Textile City Sports Center	40,000	CL1, 12th
South	Fujian Tianxin	(China) Zhao Tuqiang	Fuzhou (playing in Jinjiang)	Quanzhou College of Technology Stadium	3,745	7th
South	Hunan Billows	(China) Tang Jing	Changsha (playing in Yiyang)	Yiyang Olympic Sports Park Stadium	30,000	10th
South	Suzhou Dongwu	(China) Liu Junwei	Suzhou	Suzhou Olympic Sports Centre	45,000	12th
South	Suzhou Dongwu	(China) Liu Junwei	Suzhou	Suzhou Sports Center	35,000	12th
South	Kunshan F.C.	(China) Gao Yao	Kunshan	Kunshan Sports Centre Stadium	30,000	13th
South	Shenzhen Pengcheng	(China) Chen Dazhi	Shenzhen	Xixiang Sports Centre	3,000	18th
South	Jiangxi Liansheng	(China) Huang Yong	Ruichang	Ruichang Sports Park Stadium	N/A	22nd
South	Sichuan Jiuniu	(China) Wang Hongwei	Chengdu	Nanhu Sports Center	20,000	24th
South	Sichuan Jiuniu	(China) Wang Hongwei	Chengdu	Chengdu Longquanyi Football Stadium	42,000	24th
South	Chengdu Better City ^{P}	(Spain) José Carlos Granero	Chengdu	Chengdu Longquanyi Football Stadium	42,000	CMCL, 2nd
South	Hubei Chufeng United ^{P}	(Brazil) Luíz Felipe	Wuhan	Xiaogan Sports Centre Stadium	27,000	CMCL, 3rd
South	Hubei Chufeng United ^{P}	(Brazil) Luíz Felipe	Wuhan	Xinhua Road Stadium	22,140	CMCL, 3rd
South	Hangzhou Wuyue Qiantang ^{P}		Hangzhou (playing in Yiwu)	Yiwu Meihu Sports Center Stadium	35,260	CMCL, 4th
South	Lhasa Urban Construction Investment ^{P}	(China) Zhang Biao	Lhasa (playing in Deyang)	Deyang Sports Park Stadium	N/A	CMCL, 5th
South	Nanjing Shaye ^{P}	(China) Tang Bo	Nanjing	Nanjing Youth Olympic Sports Park	21,000	CMCL, 6th
South	Nanjing Shaye ^{P}	(China) Tang Bo	Nanjing	Hohai University (Jiangning Campus) Stadium	N/A	CMCL, 6th
South	Yunnan Kunlu ^{P}	(China) He Yunqun	Kunming (playing in Qujing)	Qujing Cultural Sports Park Stadium	34,162	CMCL, 10th
South	Wuhan Three Towns ^{P}	(Spain) Albert Garcia Xicota	Wuhan	Hankou Cultural Sports Centre	20,000	CMCL, 11th
South	Guangxi Baoyun ^{P}	(China) Yang Lin	Liuzhou	Liuzhou Sports Center	35,000	CMCL, 13th

=== Clubs Locations ===
Location of teams in 2019 China League Two

=== Managerial changes ===
Club	Outgoing manager	Date of vacancy	Incoming manager	Date of appointment
Guangxi Baoyun	(China) Han Zhenyuan	1 December 2018	(South Korea) Wang Jung-hyun	1 December 2018
Kunshan F.C.	(China) Tang Jing	12 December 2018	(Serbia) Dragan Okuka	12 December 2018
Jiangxi Liansheng	(Croatia) Kazimir Vulić	15 December 2018	(China) Huang Yong	15 December 2018
Hebei Aoli Jingying	(China) Zhang Hui	31 December 2018	(Brazil) Vila	1 January 2019
Hangzhou Wuyue Qiantang	(China) Gu Zhongqing	31 December 2018	(Montenegro) Milovan Prelević	10 January 2019
Hubei Chufeng United	(China) Huang Zhengguo	31 December 2018	(Brazil) Luíz Felipe	10 January 2019
Shenyang Urban	(China) Wang Gang	31 December 2018	(China) Yu Ming	1 February 2019
Suzhou Dongwu	(Japan) Kazuo Uchida	31 December 2018	(China) Liu Junwei	3 February 2019
Shanxi Metropolis	(China) Huang Hongyi	31 December 2018	(Bosnia and Herzegovina) Nermin Šabić	1 March 2019
Yanbian Beiguo	(South Korea) Choi Jin-han	31 December 2018	(Serbia) Nebojša Maksimović	1 March 2019
Qingdao Red Lions	(China) Guo Zuojin	31 December 2018	(Netherlands) Toon Beijer	7 March 2019
Sichuan Jiuniu	(Croatia) Dario Dabac	11 January 2019	(China) Wang Hongwei	27 February 2019
Yinchuan Helanshan	(China) Fan Yuhong	22 January 2019	(China) Zhao Changhong	22 January 2019
Baoding Yingli ETS	(China) Han Yalin	25 January 2019	(China) Fan Yuhong	25 January 2019
Dalian Chanjoy	(China) Jiang Feng	1 February 2019	(Bosnia and Herzegovina) Dželaludin Muharemović	10 February 2019
Yunnan Kunlu	(Croatia) Goran Miscevic	5 February 2019	(China) Cheng Liang	5 February 2019
Hunan Billows	(China) Sun Wei	25 February 2019	(China) Tang Jing	25 February 2019
Jiangsu Yancheng Dingli	(China) Wang Hongwei	2 March 2019	(China) Huang Yong	2 March 2019
Zhejiang Yiteng	(China) Hu Zhaojun (caretaker)	3 March 2019	(England) Giles Stille	3 March 2019
Wuhan Three Towns	(China) Zeng Qinggao	4 March 2019	(Spain) Albert Garcia Xicota	4 March 2019
Xi'an Daxing Chongde	(China) Gao Xuehua	7 March 2019	(Serbia) Bojan Pavlović	7 March 2019
Guangxi Baoyun	(South Korea) Wang Jung-hyun	3 April 2019	(China) Pei Encai	3 April 2019
Shanxi Metropolis	(Bosnia and Herzegovina) Nermin Šabić	7 April 2019	(Chinese Taipei) Vom Ca-nhum	7 April 2019
Qingdao Red Lions	(Netherlands) Toon Beijer	16 April 2019	(Slovenia) Tomaž Kavčič	16 April 2019
Yunnan Kunlu	(China) Cheng Liang	18 April 2019	(Serbia) Milan Jelić	18 April 2019
Qingdao Jonoon	(Serbia) Aleksandar Kristić	11 May 2019	(Serbia) Dragoslav Milenković	11 May 2019
Yanbian Beiguo	(Serbia) Nebojša Maksimović	23 May 2019	(China) Jin Qing	23 May 2019
Kunshan F.C.	(Serbia) Dragan Okuka	22 June 2019	(China) Gao Yao	22 June 2019
Dalian Chanjoy	(Bosnia and Herzegovina) Dželaludin Muharemović	24 June 2019	(China) Zhao Faqing	24 June 2019
Guangxi Baoyun	(China) Pei Encai	24 June 2019	(China) Yang Lin	24 June 2019
Yunnan Kunlu	(Serbia) Milan Jelić	5 July 2019	(China) He Yunqun	5 July 2019

== League tables ==
=== North Group ===
Pos	Team	Pld	W	D	L	GF	GA	GD	Pts	Promotion or relegation
1	Shenyang Urban (P)	30	23	5	2	62	19	+43	74	China League One
2	Taizhou Yuanda (Q)	30	22	5	3	76	21	+55	71	Promotion Play-offs
3	Hebei Aoli Jingying (Q)	30	21	6	3	68	20	+48	69 (Note: Hebei Aoli Jingying is ahead of Zibo Cuju on head-to-head points: Hebei Aoli Jingying 3–0 Zibo Cuju, Zibo Cuju 2–0 Hebei Aoli Jingying.)	Promotion Play-offs
4	Zibo Cuju	30	22	3	5	60	13	+47	69	7th–26th place Play-offs
5	Yinchuan Helanshan	30	18	7	5	57	27	+30	61	7th–26th place Play-offs
6	Dalian Chanjoy	30	13	6	11	63	45	+18	45 (Note: Dalian Chanjoy is ahead of Qingdao Jonoon on head-to-head points: Dalian Chanjoy 1–1 Qingdao Jonoon, Qingdao Jonoon 0–1 Dalian Chanjoy.)	7th–26th place Play-offs
7	Qingdao Jonoon (Note: Qingdao Jonoon was deducted six points for failing to implement ruling of FIFA.)	30	14	9	7	39	18	+21	45	7th–26th place Play-offs
8	Jiangsu Yancheng Dingli	30	8	9	13	33	37	−4	33	7th–26th place Play-offs
9	Yanbian Beiguo	30	9	5	16	33	57	−24	32	7th–26th place Play-offs
10	Beijing BIT	30	9	3	18	36	61	−25	30	7th–26th place Play-offs
11	Jilin Baijia	30	7	6	17	24	46	−22	27 (Note: Jilin Baijia is ahead of Qingdao Red Lions on head-to-head points: Jilin Baijia 2–0 Qingdao Red Lions, Qingdao Red Lions 1–1 Jilin Baijia.)	7th–26th place Play-offs
12	Qingdao Red Lions	30	7	6	17	25	53	−28	27	7th–26th place Play-offs
13	Baoding Yingli ETS (Note: Baoding Yingli ETS was deducted six points for failing to implement ruling of CFA.)	30	9	5	16	36	42	−6	26	7th–26th place Play-offs
14	Inner Mongolia Caoshangfei (Q)	30	6	7	17	26	63	−37	25	Relegation play-offs
15	Xi'an Daxing Chongde (Q)	30	5	4	21	18	64	−46	19	Relegation play-offs
16	Shanxi Metropolis (R)	30	2	4	24	12	82	−70	10	Relegation

Source: CFA
Rules for classification: 1) Points; 2) Head-to-head points; 3) Head-to-head goal difference; 4) Head-to-head goals scored; 5) Goal difference; 6) Goals scored; 7) Disciplinary points (1 point for each yellow card, 3 points for each red card)
(P) Promoted; (Q) Qualified for the phase indicated; (R) Relegated

=== South Group ===
Pos	Team	Pld	W	D	L	GF	GA	GD	Pts	Promotion or relegation
1	Chengdu Better City (P)	30	20	7	3	53	12	+41	67 (Note: Chengdu Better City is ahead of Suzhou Dongwu on head-to-head points: Chengdu Better City 3–1 Suzhou Dongwu, Suzhou Dongwu 0–0 Chengdu Better City.)	China League One
2	Suzhou Dongwu (Q)	30	21	4	5	54	17	+37	67	Promotion Play-offs
3	Jiangxi Liansheng (Q)	30	19	4	7	41	21	+20	61	Promotion Play-offs
4	Sichuan Jiuniu	30	17	5	8	47	27	+20	56	7th–26th place Play-offs
5	Kunshan F.C.	30	17	4	9	45	23	+22	55	7th–26th place Play-offs
6	Wuhan Three Towns (Note: CFA awarded Hubei Chufeng United a 3–0 win as a result of Wuhan Three Towns fielding the ineligible player.)	30	14	10	6	33	18	+15	52	7th–26th place Play-offs
7	Fujian Tianxin	30	13	5	12	36	42	−6	44	7th–26th place Play-offs
8	Zhejiang Yiteng	30	12	5	13	34	41	−7	41	7th–26th place Play-offs
9	Shenzhen Pengcheng	30	8	11	11	25	29	−4	35	7th–26th place Play-offs
10	Hubei Chufeng United	30	8	10	12	27	39	−12	34 (Note: Hubei Chufeng United is ahead of Hangzhou Wuyue Qiantang on goal differences: Hubei Chufeng United 2–3 Hangzhou Wuyue Qiantang, Hangzhou Wuyue Qiantang 0–1 Hubei Chufeng United; Hubei Chufeng United:-12; Hangzhou Wuyue Qiantang: -17.)	7th–26th place Play-offs
11	Hangzhou Wuyue Qiantang	30	10	4	16	38	55	−17	34	7th–26th place Play-offs
12	Nanjing Shaye	30	7	11	12	24	34	−10	32	7th–26th place Play-offs
13	Lhasa Urban Construction Investment	30	8	6	16	29	39	−10	30	7th–26th place Play-offs
14	Guangxi Baoyun (Q)	30	7	5	18	23	40	−17	26	Relegation play-offs
15	Hunan Billows (Q)	30	5	5	20	17	59	−42	20	Relegation play-offs
16	Yunnan Kunlu (R)	30	1	10	19	21	51	−30	13	Relegation

Source: CFA
Rules for classification: 1) Points; 2) Head-to-head points; 3) Head-to-head goal difference; 4) Head-to-head goals scored; 5) Goal difference; 6) Goals scored; 7) Disciplinary points (1 point for each yellow card, 3 points for each red card)
(P) Promoted; (Q) Qualified for the phase indicated; (R) Relegated

=== Overall table ===
Pos	Team	Pld	W	D	L	GF	GA	GD	Pts	Promotion or relegation
1	Shenyang Urban (C, P)	30	23	5	2	62	19	+43	74	China League One
2	Chengdu Better City (P)	30	20	7	3	53	12	+41	67	China League One
3	Taizhou Yuanda (O, P)	30	22	5	3	76	21	+55	71	Promotion Play-offs
4	Suzhou Dongwu (P)	30	21	4	5	54	17	+37	67	Promotion Play-offs
5	Hebei Aoli Jingying (Q)	30	21	6	3	68	20	+48	69	Promotion Play-offs
6	Jiangxi Liansheng (P)	30	19	4	7	41	21	+20	61	Promotion Play-offs
7	Zibo Cuju (Q)	30	22	3	5	60	13	+47	69 (Note: ZBS 2–2 SCJ, SCJ 2–3 ZBS.)	7th–26th place Play-offs
8	Sichuan Jiuniu (P)	30	17	5	8	47	27	+20	56	China League One
9	Kunshan F.C. (P)	30	17	4	9	45	23	+22	55 (Note: KS 3–1 YCH, YCH 0–2 KS.)	China League One
10	Yinchuan Helanshan (Note: Yinchuan Helanshan was dissolved after failing to submit the salary & bonus confirmation form.) (D, R)	30	18	7	5	57	27	+30	61	Disbanded after season
11	Wuhan Three Towns (Note: CFA awarded Hubei Chufeng United a 3–0 win as a result of Wuhan Three Towns fielding the ineligible player.) (Q)	30	14	10	6	33	18	+15	52 (Note: WHT 3–1 DLC, DLC 0–0 WHT.)	7th–26th place Play-offs
12	Dalian Chanjoy (Note: Dalian Chanjoy was dissolved after failing to submit the salary & bonus confirmation form.) (R, D, R)	30	13	6	11	63	45	+18	45	Disbanded after season
13	Fujian Tianxin (Note: Fujian Tianxin was dissolved after failing to submit the salary & bonus confirmation form.) (R, D, R, R, R)	30	13	5	12	36	42	−6	44	Disbanded after season
14	Qingdao Jonoon (Note: Qingdao Jonoon was deducted six points for failing to implement ruling of FIFA.) (Q)	30	14	9	7	39	18	+21	45	7th–26th place Play-offs
15	Jiangsu Yancheng Dingli (Q)	30	8	9	13	33	37	−4	33 (Note: JYD 2–0 ZJY, ZJY 1–2 JYD.)	7th–26th place Play-offs
16	Zhejiang Yiteng (Q)	30	12	5	13	34	41	−7	41	7th–26th place Play-offs
17	Shenzhen Pengcheng (R, D, R, R)	30	8	11	11	25	29	−4	35 (Note: SZP 5–0 YAB, YAB 1–4 SZP.)	Disbanded after season
18	Yanbian Beiguo (Note: Yanbian Beiguo was dissolved after failing to submit the salary & bonus confirmation form.) (D, R)	30	9	5	16	33	57	−24	32	Disbanded after season
19	Hubei Chufeng United (Q)	30	8	10	12	27	39	−12	34	7th–26th place Play-offs
20	Beijing BIT (Q)	30	9	3	18	36	61	−25	30	7th–26th place Play-offs
21	Hangzhou Wuyue Qiantang (R, R)	30	10	4	16	38	55	−17	34 (Note: HZW 0–0 JLB, JLB 1–2 HZW.)	Disbanded after season
22	Jilin Baijia (Note: Jilin Baijia was dissolved after failing to submit the salary & bonus confirmation form.) (R, R, R)	30	7	6	17	24	46	−22	27	Disbanded after season
23	Nanjing Shaye (Note: Nanjing Shaye was dissolved after failing to submit the salary & bonus confirmation form.) (R, R, R, R)	30	7	11	12	24	34	−10	32 (Note: NJS 1–0 QDR, QDR 2–1 NJS.)	Disbanded after season
24	Qingdao Red Lions (Q)	30	7	6	17	25	53	−28	27	7th–26th place Play-offs
25	Baoding Yingli ETS (Note: Baoding Yingli ETS was deducted six points for failing to implement ruling of CFA.) (R, D)	30	9	5	16	36	42	−6	32 (Note: BDY 4–0 LSC, LSC 5–2 BDY.)	Disbanded after season
26	Lhasa Urban Construction Investment (D, R)	30	8	6	16	29	39	−10	30 (Note: BDR)	Disbanded after season
27	Guangxi Baoyun (O)	30	7	5	18	23	40	−17	26	Relegation play-offs
28	Hunan Billows (O)	30	5	5	20	17	59	−42	20	Relegation play-offs
29	Inner Mongolia Caoshangfei (O)	30	6	7	17	26	63	−37	25	Relegation play-offs
30	Xi'an Daxing Chongde (T)	30	5	4	21	18	64	−46	19	Spared from relegation
31	Yunnan Kunlu (T)	30	1	10	19	21	51	−30	13	Spared from relegation
32	Shanxi Metropolis (T)	30	2	4	24	12	82	−70	10	Spared from relegation

Updated to match(es) played on 12 October 2019. Source: CFA
Rules for classification: 1) Points; 2) Head-to-head points; 3) Head-to-head goal difference; 4) Head-to-head goals scored; 5) Goal difference; 6) Goals scored; 7) Disciplinary points (1 point for each yellow card, 3 points for each red card)
(C) Champions; (D) Disqualified; (O) Play-off winners; (P) Promoted; (Q) Qualified for the phase indicated; (R) Relegated; (T) Readmitted

== Play-offs ==
=== Championship play-offs ===
Team 1	Agg.	Team 2	1st leg	2nd leg
Chengdu Better City	1–4	Shenyang Urban	1–2	0–2

13 October 2019
15:00

Chengdu Better City	1–2	Shenyang Urban

19 October 2019
15:00

Shenyang Urban	2–0	Chengdu Better City

=== Promotion play-offs ===
==== 3rd-6th place ====
Team 1	Agg.	Team 2	1st leg	2nd leg
Jiangxi Liansheng	2–3	Taizhou Yuanda	0–1	2–2
Hebei Aoli Jingying	2–2 (a)	Suzhou Dongwu	1–2	1–0

6 October 2019
19:00

Jiangxi Liansheng	0–1	Taizhou Yuanda

13 October 2019
15:00

Taizhou Yuanda	2–2	Jiangxi Liansheng

6 October 2019
15:00

Hebei Aoli Jingying	1–2	Suzhou Dongwu

13 October 2019
19:30

Suzhou Dongwu	0–1	Hebei Aoli Jingying

==== 3rd-4th place ====
The winner will be directly promoted to 2020 China League One while the loser will participate in the Relegation play-offs.

Team 1	Agg.	Team 2	1st leg	2nd leg
Suzhou Dongwu	2–2 (2–4 p)	Taizhou Yuanda	1–1	1–1

26 October 2019
19:30

Suzhou Dongwu	1–1	Taizhou Yuanda

2 November 2019
15:00

Taizhou Yuanda	1–1 (a.e.t.)	Suzhou Dongwu
Penalties
	4–2

==== 5th-6th place ====
The winner will participate in the Relegation play-offs.

Team 1	Agg.	Team 2	1st leg	2nd leg
Jiangxi Liansheng	2–7	Hebei Aoli Jingying	1–3	1–4

26 October 2019
15:00

Jiangxi Liansheng	1–3	Hebei Aoli Jingying

2 November 2019
15:00

Hebei Aoli Jingying	4–1	Jiangxi Liansheng

=== 7th–8th place ===
Team 1	Agg.	Team 2	1st leg	2nd leg
Sichuan Jiuniu	4–5	Zibo Cuju	2–3	2–2

5 October 2019
15:00

Sichuan Jiuniu	2–3	Zibo Cuju

12 October 2019
19:30

Zibo Cuju	2–2	Sichuan Jiuniu

=== 9th–10th place ===
Team 1	Agg.	Team 2	1st leg	2nd leg
Kunshan F.C.	5–1	Yinchuan Helanshan	3–1	2–0

5 October 2019
15:00

Kunshan F.C.	3–1	Yinchuan Helanshan

12 October 2019
15:00

Yinchuan Helanshan	0–2	Kunshan F.C.

=== 11th–12th place ===
Team 1	Agg.	Team 2	1st leg	2nd leg
Dalian Chanjoy	1–3	Wuhan Three Towns	0–0	1–3

5 October 2019
15:00

Dalian Chanjoy	0–0	Wuhan Three Towns

11 October 2019
15:00

Wuhan Three Towns	3–1	Dalian Chanjoy

=== 13th–14th place ===
Team 1	Agg.	Team 2	1st leg	2nd leg
Qingdao Jonoon	2–2 (2–4 p)	Fujian Tianxin	1–1	1–1

6 October 2019
15:00

Qingdao Jonoon	1–1	Fujian Tianxin

13 October 2019
19:00

Fujian Tianxin	1–1 (a.e.t.)	Qingdao Jonoon
Penalties
	4–2

=== 15th–16th place ===
Team 1	Agg.	Team 2	1st leg	2nd leg
Jiangsu Yancheng Dingli	4–1	Zhejiang Yiteng	2–0	2–1

5 October 2019
15:00

Jiangsu Yancheng Dingli	2–0	Zhejiang Yiteng

12 October 2019
15:00

Zhejiang Yiteng	1–2	Jiangsu Yancheng Dingli

=== 17th–18th place ===
Team 1	Agg.	Team 2	1st leg	2nd leg
Yanbian Beiguo	1–9	Shenzhen Pengcheng	1–4	0–5

5 October 2019
15:00

Yanbian Beiguo	1–4	Shenzhen Pengcheng

12 October 2019
15:00

Shenzhen Pengcheng	5–0	Yanbian Beiguo

=== 19th–20th place ===
Team 1	Agg.	Team 2	1st leg	2nd leg
Beijing BIT	1–4	Hubei Chufeng United	1–2	0–2

5 October 2019
15:00

Beijing BIT	1–2	Hubei Chufeng United

13 October 2019
15:00

Hubei Chufeng United	2–0	Beijing BIT

=== 21st–22nd place ===
Team 1	Agg.	Team 2	1st leg	2nd leg
Jilin Baijia	1–2	Hangzhou Wuyue Qiantang	1–2	0–0

5 October 2019
15:00

Jilin Baijia	1–2	Hangzhou Wuyue Qiantang

12 October 2019
15:00

Hangzhou Wuyue Qiantang	0–0	Jilin Baijia

=== 23rd–24th place ===
Team 1	Agg.	Team 2	1st leg	2nd leg
Qingdao Red Lions	2–2 (a)	Nanjing Shaye	2–1	0–1

5 October 2019
15:00

Qingdao Red Lions	2–1	Nanjing Shaye

12 October 2019
15:00

Nanjing Shaye	1–0	Qingdao Red Lions

=== 25th–26th place ===
Team 1	Agg.	Team 2	1st leg	2nd leg
Baoding Yingli ETS	6–5	Lhasa Urban Construction Investment	4–0	2–5

5 October 2019
15:00

Baoding Yingli ETS	4–0	Lhasa Urban Construction Investment

12 October 2019
15:00

Lhasa Urban Construction Investment	5–2	Baoding Yingli ETS

=== Relegation play-offs ===
==== 27th-30th place ====
Team 1	Agg.	Team 2	1st leg	2nd leg
Hunan Billows	1–1 (7–6 p)	Inner Mongolia Caoshangfei	1–0	0–1
Xi'an Daxing Chongde	1–2	Guangxi Baoyun	0–0	1–2

5 October 2019
15:00

Hunan Billows	1–0	Inner Mongolia Caoshangfei

12 October 2019
15:00

Inner Mongolia Caoshangfei	1–0 (a.e.t.)	Hunan Billows
Penalties
	6–7

5 October 2019
15:00

Xi'an Daxing Chongde	0–0	Guangxi Baoyun

12 October 2019
15:00

Guangxi Baoyun	2–1	Xi'an Daxing Chongde

==== Relegation ====
Team 1	Agg.	Team 2	1st leg	2nd leg
Hubei Huachuang	2–4	Inner Mongolia Caoshangfei	0–3	2–1
Shanghai Jiading Boji	4–2	Xi'an Daxing Chongde	2–0	2–2

27 October 2019
15:00

Hubei Huachuang	0–3	Inner Mongolia Caoshangfei

3 November 2019
14:00

Inner Mongolia Caoshangfei	1–2	Hubei Huachuang

27 October 2019
15:00

Shanghai Jiading Boji	2–0	Xi'an Daxing Chongde

3 November 2019
14:00

Xi'an Daxing Chongde	2–2	Shanghai Jiading Boji

== Results ==
=== North Group ===
Home \ Away	BDY	BIT	DLC	HBE	BTN	JYD	JLB	QDJ	QDR	SXM	SYU	TZY	XDC	YAB	YCH	ZBS
Baoding Yingli ETS	—	5–1	1–1	0–3	0–1	3–1	0–1	0–2	1–2	2–0	1–1	0–3	2–1	0–1	1–3	0–1
Beijing BIT	2–0	—	3–3	0–2	2–1	1–1	0–0	1–3	2–0	4–0	2–3	0–2	2–0	3–1	0–3	0–2
Dalian Chanjoy	2–2	2–0	—	2–3	4–0	2–1	4–0	1–1	4–1	7–1	1–2	0–2	3–1	2–1	2–2	0–2
Hebei Aoli Jingying	2–1	5–0	2–1	—	3–0	1–0	3–0	1–0	3–0	3–0	1–1	2–2	6–0	4–0	0–0	3–0
Inner Mongolia Caoshangfei	1–0	5–2	3–1	1–4	—	1–1	1–1	0–1	1–3	0–0	0–1	0–2	3–2	2–0	0–0	0–9
Jiangsu Yancheng Dingli	0–0	2–0	3–1	2–3	2–1	—	3–1	1–1	0–0	6–0	0–1	1–2	1–0	2–1	0–0	0–3
Jilin Baijia	0–2	0–2	2–2	0–1	2–0	1–1	—	1–0	2–0	2–1	0–4	0–2	1–2	3–0	2–2	0–2
Qingdao Jonoon	1–1	3–0	0–1	1–1	2–0	2–0	2–0	—	2–0	5–0	0–0	0–0	1–1	3–1	0–2	0–0
Qingdao Red Lions	0–3	1–2	0–2	0–3	1–1	1–1	1–1	2–1	—	1–0	0–4	0–1	1–0	2–2	1–3	1–0
Shanxi Metropolis	1–2	1–2	1–6	1–1	0–0	0–1	1–2	0–1	1–3	—	0–4	0–1	2–0	1–1	0–5	0–1
Shenyang Urban	3–1	2–0	3–1	1–0	2–1	3–1	2–1	1–1	2–1	3–0	—	1–0	5–0	2–1	1–0	2–0
Taizhou Yuanda	4–0	4–3	4–1	3–1	6–0	2–1	2–1	1–2	2–0	4–0	2–2	—	7–0	6–0	3–1	2–2
Xi'an Daxing Chongde	0–3	2–1	1–2	0–4	2–1	0–0	1–0	0–1	2–2	0–1	0–2	1–4	—	0–2	0–2	1–0
Yanbian Beiguo	0–3	2–0	0–4	0–0	1–1	3–1	1–0	0–3	2–1	5–0	2–1	0–3	3–0	—	0–0	0–1
Yinchuan Helanshan	2–1	2–1	2–1	2–3	4–0	2–0	3–0	1–0	3–0	5–0	1–3	2–0	1–1	3–2	—	0–5
Zibo Cuju	2–1	4–0	1–0	2–0	5–1	1–0	1–0	1–0	2–0	5–0	1–0	0–0	1–0	6–1	0–1	—

Legend: Blue = home team win; Yellow = draw; Red = away team win.
For upcoming matches, an "a" indicates there is an article about the rivalry between the two participants.

=== South Group ===
Home \ Away	CDB	FJT	GXB	HZW	HBC	HNX	JXL	KS	LSC	NJS	SZP	SCJ	SZD	WHT	YNK	ZJY
Chengdu Better City	—	5–1	2–0	0–0	2–0	4–0	4–0	1–0	3–0	5–1	2–0	3–1	3–1	1–0	1–0	4–0
Fujian Tianxin	2–1	—	1–0	4–2	0–0	3–0	1–0	2–1	2–0	4–2	1–0	0–2	0–3	0–2	0–0	3–1
Guangxi Baoyun	0–1	0–0	—	0–1	2–1	0–1	0–2	1–0	3–1	1–1	1–0	0–2	1–0	0–1	2–1	1–1
Hangzhou Wuyue Qiantang	2–3	0–1	2–0	—	0–1	3–1	1–3	0–3	1–0	1–1	2–0	1–4	0–3	1–1	2–1	0–1
Hubei Chufeng United	0–0	3–2	2–1	2–3	—	2–1	1–1	0–1	3–0	1–0	0–0	0–2	3–2	0–0	0–0	1–1
Hunan Billows	0–0	0–2	2–1	1–2	2–1	—	0–2	1–3	1–1	2–1	0–0	2–4	0–1	2–1	0–0	0–1
Jiangxi Liansheng	2–1	1–0	1–0	3–1	2–0	3–0	—	1–0	1–0	1–0	0–2	0–1	0–1	0–0	4–1	3–0
Kunshan F.C.	0–1	5–0	5–1	1–2	2–0	3–0	0–2	—	3–1	1–0	1–0	2–1	2–1	1–1	2–1	1–0
Lhasa Urban Construction Investment	0–1	2–1	2–0	2–0	0–0	3–0	0–1	2–1	—	0–1	0–0	0–1	0–1	0–0	2–0	5–2
Nanjing Shaye	1–0	1–1	0–0	3–4	0–0	1–0	1–3	0–2	1–1	—	0–0	1–0	0–3	0–1	2–0	3–0
Shenzhen Pengcheng	0–2	1–1	0–4	2–1	4–0	3–0	0–0	0–0	2–1	1–1	—	2–1	1–1	0–0	3–3	0–2
Sichuan Jiuniu	1–1	4–1	2–0	2–1	3–1	6–0	2–0	0–0	1–1	0–0	0–1	—	0–2	2–1	3–0	0–3
Suzhou Dongwu	0–0	2–0	4–1	5–2	3–0	1–0	1–0	2–0	2–0	0–0	3–1	3–0	—	1–0	2–0	1–1
Wuhan Three Towns	0–0	3–2	2–1	2–0	0–3	3–0	1–1	0–1	3–0	1–0	1–0	0–0	1–0	—	2–0	0–0
Yunnan Kunlu	0–2	0–1	1–1	1–1	1–1	1–1	2–3	1–1	2–5	1–1	1–0	1–2	1–2	1–2	—	0–1
Zhejiang Yiteng	0–0	1–0	2–1	4–2	4–1	3–0	0–1	1–3	2–0	0–1	0–2	0–1	0–3	1–4	2–0	—

Legend: Blue = home team win; Yellow = draw; Red = away team win.
For upcoming matches, an "a" indicates there is an article about the rivalry between the two participants.

== Results by match played ==
=== North Group ===
Team ╲ Round	1	2	3	4	5	6	7	8	9	10	11	12	13	14	15	16	17	18	19	20	21	22	23	24	25	26	27	28	29	30
Baoding Yingli ETS	W	L	D	L	D	D	L	L	W	W	L	W	L	L	D	W	W	D	L	L	L	L	L	W	L	L	L	L	W	W
Beijing BIT	D	W	W	L	L	L	L	L	W	W	D	L	L	L	W	L	L	L	D	L	L	L	L	L	W	W	W	L	L	W
Dalian Chanjoy	W	W	D	W	L	W	L	W	W	L	L	L	D	L	W	W	D	D	D	L	W	W	W	W	D	L	L	W	L	L
Hebei Aoli Jingying	W	D	W	W	W	W	W	W	W	W	W	W	D	D	D	W	W	W	W	W	L	W	W	W	D	W	D	L	W	L
Inner Mongolia Caoshangfei	L	L	L	L	D	D	L	W	L	L	D	D	L	W	L	L	L	L	L	L	D	D	W	W	L	L	L	W	D	W
Jiangsu Yancheng Dingli	D	L	D	L	W	W	W	L	L	L	L	D	W	D	D	W	L	D	D	D	L	L	L	L	D	L	W	W	W	L
Jilin Baijia	W	L	L	L	W	L	W	W	D	L	D	L	D	D	L	L	D	L	L	L	L	D	W	L	W	L	L	W	L	L
Qingdao Jonoon	L	W	W	W	L	D	W	D	L	W	W	W	D	D	D	L	D	W	W	W	W	W	L	W	D	D	W	L	L	D
Qingdao Red Lions	L	L	D	D	D	L	L	L	W	L	D	W	D	W	L	W	L	D	W	L	L	L	L	L	L	W	W	L	L	L
Shanxi Metropolis	L	D	L	L	L	D	L	L	L	L	L	L	L	W	L	L	L	L	L	L	D	L	L	L	L	L	L	L	W	D
Shenyang Urban	D	W	W	W	D	W	L	W	W	W	L	W	D	W	D	W	W	W	W	W	W	W	W	W	W	W	W	W	W	D
Taizhou Yuanda	D	L	W	W	W	W	W	W	D	W	W	W	W	W	D	L	D	L	W	W	W	W	W	D	W	W	W	W	W	W
Xi'an Daxing Chongde	L	L	L	D	L	D	L	L	L	L	L	L	W	L	W	L	W	W	L	D	L	L	L	L	L	D	L	L	L	W
Yanbian Beiguo	L	W	L	L	D	L	W	L	L	L	W	L	L	L	W	W	L	W	L	W	W	W	D	L	D	L	L	L	D	D
Yinchuan Helanshan	W	W	L	W	D	D	W	W	D	W	W	L	W	L	W	W	W	W	D	W	W	W	D	W	D	W	D	W	L	L
Zibo Cuju	W	W	W	W	W	L	W	D	D	W	W	W	W	W	L	L	W	L	W	W	W	L	W	D	W	W	W	W	W	W

W = Win; D = Draw; L = Loss

=== South Group ===
Team ╲ Round	1	2	3	4	5	6	7	8	9	10	11	12	13	14	15	16	17	18	19	20	21	22	23	24	25	26	27	28	29	30
Chengdu Better City	L	D	D	W	D	L	W	W	W	D	W	W	W	D	W	W	W	W	W	W	W	W	W	D	W	L	W	D	W	W
Fujian Tianxin	W	D	L	D	D	W	W	W	L	W	W	W	L	L	W	D	L	L	W	W	L	W	L	L	W	L	D	L	W	L
Guangxi Baoyun	L	L	W	L	L	D	D	L	L	L	L	L	L	L	L	D	L	W	W	W	W	D	L	L	W	L	D	W	L	L
Hangzhou Wuyue Qiantang	D	D	D	W	W	L	L	W	W	L	L	L	W	W	L	W	W	L	W	L	W	L	L	W	L	L	L	L	L	L
Hubei Chufeng United	W	D	L	W	L	L	D	L	W	W	D	W	L	L	D	D	W	L	L	L	D	L	D	L	L	D	D	D	W	W
Hunan Billows	L	D	L	L	L	D	L	W	L	L	L	L	D	W	L	L	L	L	L	L	L	D	L	W	L	L	L	D	W	W
Jiangxi Liansheng	W	W	L	W	W	L	D	L	W	W	L	W	W	D	L	W	W	L	W	W	D	W	L	W	W	W	W	W	D	W
Kunshan F.C.	L	W	W	W	D	W	L	L	L	D	L	W	W	D	W	L	D	W	L	W	W	L	W	W	W	W	W	L	W	W
Lhasa Urban Construction Investment	L	W	D	L	L	D	D	L	W	W	L	L	L	L	D	L	W	L	L	W	W	L	W	L	L	D	W	L	D	L
Nanjing Shaye	W	D	D	L	D	L	D	D	W	L	D	L	L	D	W	L	L	W	L	L	L	D	W	W	L	D	D	D	W	L
Shenzhen Pengcheng	L	L	L	W	L	W	W	W	L	D	D	L	L	W	L	D	D	L	W	W	D	D	D	D	L	D	L	W	D	D
Sichuan Jiuniu	W	L	W	L	W	L	W	D	L	W	W	W	W	D	W	W	W	W	L	W	L	W	L	D	W	D	D	W	L	W
Suzhou Dongwu	W	L	W	L	W	W	D	W	W	L	W	W	W	D	W	W	W	W	W	L	W	W	W	D	W	W	W	D	L	W
Wuhan Three Towns	L	W	W	W	D	W	D	L	W	D	W	L	D	D	W	D	L	W	W	L	L	W	W	W	L	W	D	W	D	D
Yunnan Kunlu	D	L	L	D	D	D	L	L	L	D	D	L	D	D	L	L	L	L	L	L	L	L	L	L	W	D	L	D	L	L
Zhejiang Yiteng	W	W	W	L	W	W	D	W	L	D	W	W	D	W	L	D	L	W	L	L	D	L	W	L	L	W	L	L	L	L

W = Win; D = Draw; L = Loss

== Top scorers ==
As of 27 October 2019

Rank	Player	Club	Goals
1	(China) Ma Xiaolei	Chengdu Better City	23
2	(China) Zhu Shiyu	Shenyang Urban	19
3	(China) Wei Jingxing	Jiangxi Liansheng	17
3	(China) Ge Wei	Taizhou Yuanda	17
3	(China) Qu Xiaohui	Dalian Chanjoy	16

== Awards ==
The awards of 2019 China League Two were announced on 4 December 2019.

Award	Winner	Club
Player of the Season	(China) Zhu Shiyu	Shenyang Urban
Golden Boot	(China) Ma Xiaolei	Chengdu Better City
Manager of the Season	(China) Yin Tiesheng	Taizhou Yuanda
Goalkeeper of the Season	(China) Li Shi	Chengdu Better City
Young Player of the Season	(China) Zhang Hui	Wuhan Three Towns
