= Chinese Champions League =

- Organising body: Chinese Football Association
- Founded: 2002
- Country: China
- Confederation: AFC
- Number of clubs: 64
- Level on pyramid: 4
- Promotion to: China League Two
- Relegation to: Member Football Association leagues
- Domestic cup: Chinese FA Cup
- Current champions: Shenzhen 2028 (1st title) (2024)
- Most championships: Shenzhen Bogang (5 titles)
- Broadcaster(s): PPTV (live streaming)
- Website: www.thecfa.cn/yyls/
- Current: 2025 Chinese Champions League

The Chinese Football Association Member Association Champions League (Chinese: 中国足球协会会员协会冠军联赛), referred to as the Chinese Champions League or CMCL, is the fourth-tier football league of the People's Republic of China. The league is under the auspices of the Chinese Football Association. The league was known as Chinese Football Association Bing League (中国足球协会丙级联赛) before 2006 and Chinese Football Association Amateur League (中国足球协会业余联赛) between 2006 and 2017, before changing to its current name by 2018.

== History ==
In 1998, the Chinese Football Association held the "98 Li Ning Cup National Amateur Football Club League". in order to promote the further popularization and sustainable development of football in China, expand the football population, promote the improvement of socialization, promote the construction and development of local member associations, and cultivate and create a football market; At the same time, in line with international standards, improve the Chinese adult football league system, and lay a solid foundation for the connection of China's adult football competition system, which is the leader of the Chinese Super League in 2004. On October 2001, 10, the Chinese Football Association announced in Shanghai that it would hold the third division in 16 , and take this event as the last link in the Chinese Football Association's improvement of the domestic four-level football competition system.

In 2006, it was renamed the National Football Association Amateur League, in 2010 it was renamed the Chinese Football Association Amateur League (CAL), and in 2018 it was renamed the Chinese Football Association Member Association Champions League.

From 2011 to 2015, it was linked to the qualification of the Chinese FA Cup. Since 2011, the Chinese Football Association Amateur League has been a qualification tournament for the Chinese FA Cup, together with the AFC China Vision City League Champions Cup (2011-2012) and the China FA Cup Qualification Tournament (2014-). Since 2016, the qualification for the FA Cup has been limited to teams that have qualified for the China Second League, and all teams participating in the main stage of the Chinese FA Cup are selected from the qualification round of the Chinese FA Cup.

Since 2014, it has gradually formed a promotion and demotion system with the Chinese Football Association B League at the previous level.

== Winners ==
Season	Winners	Runners-up	Third place	Fourth place
2002	Guangzhou Restaurant	Shenzhen Bogang	Dalian Yingdu	Shanghai 2000
2003	Shenzhen Bogang	Hunan Sports	Suzhou Jinfeng	Shanghai The 9
2004	Shenzhen Bogang	Qingdao Liming	Shaanxi Expressway	Yunnan Satellite Channel
2005	Shenzhen Bogang	Shanghai Songjiang Gas	Guangzhou Restaurant	Changchun Beililai
2006	Shenzhen Bogang	Changchun Normal University	Kunming Traffic Police	Hangzhou Sinobal
2007	Shenzhen Bogang	Yanji Court	Nanjing Baotai	Wuhan Dongfeng Honda
2008	Wuhan Dongfeng Honda	Hunchun Procuratorate	Yanji Court	Wenzhou Lingxi Shengyu
2009	Wuhan Hongxing	Wuhan Dongfeng Honda	Wuhan Huachuang	Luoyang Lightning Protection
2010	Wuhan Hongxing	Xiamen Dongyuhang	Wuhan Dongfeng Honda	Hebei Yingli
2011	Dalian Longjuanfeng	Jiujiang Liansheng	Changchun Fengyun	Wuhan Dongfeng Honda
2012	Suzhou Jinfu	Qingdao Kunpeng	Shenyang Riverside	Shenzhen Yinwu
2013	Dalian Taian Old Brothers	Hubei Huachuang	Wuhan Hongxing	Henan Orient Classic
2014	Wuhan Hongxing	Dalian Hailongxing	Qingdao Fengfa	Guangxi Longguida
2015	Suzhou Dongwu	Hainan Seamen	Shenzhen Renren	Shenyang City
2016	Dalian Boyang	Shaanxi Chang'an Athletic	Wuhan Chufeng Heli	Shanghai Sunfun
2017	Zibo Sunday	Anhui Hefei Guiguan	Qiqihaer Zhongjian Bituminous Concrete	Zhaoqing Hengtai
2018	Taizhou Yuanda	Chengdu Better City	Hubei Chufeng United	Hangzhou Wuyue Qiantang
2019	Nanjing Fengfan	Shenzhen Bogang	Shandong Wangyue	Xi'an UKD
2020	Guangdong Lianghetang	Xiamen Qudian	Sichuan Huakun	Yichun Jiangxi Tungsten Grand Tiger
2021	Jinan Xingzhou	Jiangsu Zhongnan Codion	Tai'an Huawei	Lingshui Dingli Jingcheng
2022	Yuxi Yukun	Chongqing Tongliangloong	Guangxi Lanhang	Dalian Duxing
2023	Langfang Glory City	Shenzhen Juniors	Shaanxi Chang'an Union	Guangxi Hengchen
2024	Shenzhen 2028	Guizhou Zhucheng Athletic	Guangdong Mingtu	Guangzhou Alpha
2025	Xiamen 1026	Shanghai Second	Dalian Kewei	Dalian Hanyu

== Notable Participants ==
Clubs	Times participated in regional/group stage	Times reached national final stage
Wuhan Dongfeng Honda	11/2004, 2006–2014, 2016	9/2004, 2006–2011, 2013–2014
Hubei Huachuang	11/2006, 2009, 2011–2014, 2017–2021	6/2009, 2013–2014, 2019–2021
Henan Orient Classic	9/2010, 2013–2017, 2019, 2021, 2023	3/2010, 2013, 2016
Liuzhou Ranko	9/2015–	2/2015, 2020
Shanxi Longchengren	8/2015–2016, 2018–2021, 2023–	3/2015–2016, 2020
Shenzhen Bogang	7/2002–2007, 2019	7/2002–2007, 2019
Wuhan Hongxing	7/2009–2015	7/2009–2015
Xi'an Hi-Tech Yilian	7/2015–2016, 2019, 2021–	1/2019
Hangzhou Sinobal	6/2002, 2004–2007, 2010	2/2002, 2004
Heilongjiang Tianfeng	6/2011–2016	2/2013–2014
Shanghai Jiading Boji	6/2012–2014, 2017–2019	2/2013, 2019
Yingkou Chaoyue	6/2018–2019, 2021–	1/2018
Dalian Longjuanfeng	5/2011–2012, 2014–2015, 2017	5/2011–2012, 2014–2015, 2017
Hebei Yingli	5/2010–2014	4/2010–2013
Changchun Normal University	5/2003–2007	2/2004–2005
Qingdao Kunpeng	5/2010, 2012–2015	2/2012–2013
Ningbo Yinbo	5/2011, 2014, 2016–2017, 2019	1/2014
Inner Mongolia Caoshangfei	5/2012–2014, 2023–	2/2012, 2014
Fujian Quanzhou Qinggong	5/2018, 2021–	1/2023
Zibo Sunday	4/2003, 2013, 2016–2017	3/2013, 2016–2017
Changchun Subway	4/2010, 2012–2014	3/2010, 2013–2014
Hangzhou Qiantang	4/2012–2013, 2016, 2022	2/2013, 2022
Changchun Shenhua	4/2015, 2021–2023	2/2015, 2022–2023
Hunan Sports Lottery	4/2003, 2013–2015	1/2003
Shaanxi Baocheng	4/2008–2011	1/2010
Xiamen Dongyuhang	4/2010, 2012–2014	1/2010
Hubei Wuhan Athletics Zaiming	4/2018–2019, 2021–2022	1/2019
Fuzhou Hengxing	4/2018–2019, 2021–2022	1/2022
Guangdong Red Treasure	4/2021–	1/2023
Shaanxi Expressway	3/2003–2005	3/2003–2005
Jiujiang Liansheng	3/2009–2011	3/2009–2011
Suzhou Dongwu	3/2012–2013, 2015	3/2012–2013, 2015
Zhaoqing Hengtai	3/2014, 2016–2017	3/2014, 2016–2017
Hubei Chufeng United	3/2016–2018	3/2016–2018
Guangzhou Restaurant	3/2002–2003, 2005	2/2002, 2005
Yanji Court	3/2007–2009	2/2007–2008
Shenyang Riverside	3/2012–2014	2/2012–2013
Heilongjiang Crane City	3/2013, 2017–2018	2/2017–2018
Rizhao Yuqi	3/2015, 2022–	2/2022–
Nanjing Shaye	3/2016–2018	2/2017–2018
Qingdao Zhongchuang Hengtai	3/2017–2019	2/2017, 2019
Dandong Hantong	3/2018–2020	2/2019–2020
Jingchuan Wenhui	3/2021–2023	2/2021–2022
Henan Shenghuang	3/2003–2005	1/2005
Fujian Tianxin	3/2004, 2006, 2017	1/2017
Kunming Traffic Police	3/2006, 2008, 2013	1/2006
Qinghai Chaoyang	3/2009–2011	1/2009
Guangxi Liuzhou Liuyue	3/2012–2014	1/2013
Qingdao Red Lions	3/2016–2018	1/2018
Xi'an Chongde Ronghai	3/2021–2023	2/2021, 2023

== Feeder leagues ==
- Changchun Amateur League
- Chengdu City League Super League
- Chongqing Amateur League Super Division
- Dalian City League Group A
- Fujian FA Super League
- Gansu Super League
- Guangdong FA Super League
- Guangxi Super League
- Guangzhou City League
- Hainan Football Super League
- Hebei League
- Henan Amateur Championship League Division A
- Heilongjiang FA Super League
- Hubei Mass League
- Hunan Football League
- Inner Mongolia Male Super League
- Jiangsu FA Championship League
- Jiangxi FA Super League
- Liaoning FA Amateur Super League
- Nanjing FA Super League
- Ningxia FA Super League
- Qingdao City Super League
- Qinghai Super League
- Shaanxi National Super League
- Shandong Amateur Super League
- Shanghai FA Super League Group A
- Shanxi FA Super League
- Shenzhen FA City Super League
- Sichuan Amateur League
- Tianjin FA Super League
- Wuhan City Super League
- Xiamen FA Super League
- Xinjiang FA Champions League
- Zhejiang Super League
