= Anhui Hefei Guiguan F.C. =

Chinese football club

Hefei Guiguan Héféi Guìguàn 合肥桂冠
- Full name: Anhui Hefei Guiguan Football Club 安徽合肥桂冠足球俱乐部
- Founded: 1 July 2016
- Dissolved: 11 July 2018
- 2018: League Two, 27th

Anhui Hefei Guiguan Football Club (Chinese: 安徽合肥桂冠足球俱乐部) was a Chinese football club based in Hefei, Anhui.

On 11 July 2018, the Chinese Football Association announced Anhui Hefei Guiguan failed to register for the rest of the season due to wage arrears.

== Managerial history ==
- (China) Huang Yan (2016)
- (South Korea) Kim do keun (2016–2017)
- (Serbia) Darko Nović (2017)
- (Serbia) Aleksandar Pantić (2018)

== Results ==
All-time league rankings

- As of the end of 2018 season.

| Year | Div | Pld | W | D | L | GF | GA | GD | Pts | Pos. | FA Cup | Super Cup | AFC | Att./G | Stadium |
|---|---|---|---|---|---|---|---|---|---|---|---|---|---|---|---|
| 2016 | 4 | | | | | | | | | 7 | DNQ | DNQ | DNQ | | |
| 2017 | 4 | | | | | | | | | RU | DNQ | DNQ | DNQ | | Hefei Olympic Sports Center Stadium |
| 2018 | 3 | 26 | 0 | 0 | 26 | 0 | 78 | −78 | 0 | 27 | R4 | DNQ | DNQ | 307 | Hefei Olympic Sports Center Stadium |

Key

| | China top division |
| | China second division |
| | China third division |
| | China fourth division |
| W | Winners |
| RU | Runners-up |
| 3 | Third place |
| | Relegated |

- Pld = Played
- W = Games won
- D = Games drawn
- L = Games lost
- F = Goals for
- A = Goals against
- Pts = Points
- Pos = Final position
- DNQ = Did not qualify
- DNE = Did not enter
- NH = Not Held
- – = Does Not Exist
- R1 = Round 1
- R2 = Round 2
- R3 = Round 3
- R4 = Round 4
- F = Final
- SF = Semi-finals
- QF = Quarter-finals
- R16 = Round of 16
- Group = Group stage
- GS2 = Second Group stage
- QR1 = First Qualifying Round
- QR2 = Second Qualifying Round
- QR3 = Third Qualifying Round
