= 2019 Chinese Champions League =

Chinese Champions League
- Season: 2019
- Champions: Nanjing Fengfan
- Promoted: Nanjing Fengfan; Shenzhen Bogang; Xi'an UKD; Shanghai Jiading Boji; Qingdao Zhongchuang Hengtai
- All statistics correct as of 9 November 2019.

The 2019 Chinese Football Association Member Association Champions League (Simplified Chinese: 2019中国足球协会会员协会冠军联赛), also known as SWM Motors 2019 Chinese Football Association Member Association Champions League for sponsorship reasons (Simplified Chinese: SWM斯威汽车2019中国足球协会会员协会冠军联赛), formerly known as Chinese Football Association Bing League (中国足球协会丙级联赛) (before 2006) and Chinese Football Association Amateur League (中国足球协会业余联赛) (2006–2017), is the fourth-tier football league of the People's Republic of China. The league is under the auspices of the Chinese Football Association.

== Promotion and relegation ==
=== From Champions League ===
Teams promoted to 2019 China League Two

- Taizhou Yuanda
- Chengdu Better City
- Hubei Chufeng United
- Hangzhou Wuyue Qiantang
- Lhasa Urban Construction Investment
- Nanjing Shaye
- Shanxi Metropolis
- Yunnan Kunlu
- Wuhan Shangwen
- Guangxi Baoyun
- Qingdao Red Lions
- Xi'an Daxing Chongde

== Format ==
The qualification structure is as follows:

- Qualifying Round: Chinese Football Association subordinate Provincial League and City League, champion will advance to the Regional Finals.
- Regional Finals: 50-60 teams were divided into 10 groups of five or six teams to play single round robin matches. The ten group winners and the six best group runners-up advanced to the National Finals.
- National Finals: 16 teams were divided into two groups, North and South. The league is made up of two stages, the group stage and the play-off. The Group Stage is a play single round robin matches. The Play-off Stage is a two-legged elimination. The winners may be qualify for the 2020 China League Two.

== Qualifying round ==
China Amateur Football League includes 44 regional leagues. 2018 or 2019 season champion will advance to the Regional Finals.

Teams qualified for the Regional Finals

Groups	No	FA	Team	Qualifying method	Position	Remark
A	1	Guangdong FA	Huizhou Huixin	2018 Chinese Champions League	Group	
A	2	Guangdong FA	Maoming Oil City	2018 Chinese Champions League	Group	
A	3	Shenzhen FA	Shenzhen Bogang	2018 Shenzhen FA Super League	Fourth place	
A	4	Guangxi FA	Liuzhou Ranko	2018 Chinese Champions League	Group	
A	5	Guangxi FA	Nanning Binjiang	2018 Guangxi FA Super League	Third place	
A	6	Macau FA	MFA Development	2018 Chinese Champions League	Group	
B	1	Shanghai FA	Shanghai Jiading Boji	2018 Chinese Champions League	Group	
B	2	Nanjing FA	Nanjing Balanta	2018 Chinese Champions League	Group	
B	3	Jiangsu FA	Yangzhou Huaao Fengyun	2018 Jiangsu FA Super League	5th	
B	4	Zhejiang FA	Huzhou LOHAS	2018 Zhejiang FA Super League	Third place	
B	5	Zhejiang FA	Jinhua Zhongchou	2018 Chinese Champions League	Group	
B	6	Xiamen FA	Xiamen Nanxun	2018 Xiamen FA Football League	Runners-up	
C	1	Liaoning FA	Yingkou Chaoyue	2018 Chinese Champions League	9th	
C	2	Liaoning FA	Dandong Hantong	2018 Chinese Champions League	Group	
C	3	Shanxi FA	Shanxi Zhisheng	2018 Chinese Champions League	Group	
C	4	Shanxi FA	Shanxi Jinzhihu	2018 Chinese Champions League	Group	
C	5	Qingdao FA	Qingdao Zhongchuang Hengtai	2018 Chinese Champions League	Group	
D	1	Guangdong FA	Zhaoqing Topfung Eastlake			
D	2	Guangzhou FA	Guangzhou Glorious	2018 Chinese Champions League	Group	
D	3	Hainan FA	Qionghai Jinghaicheng	2018 Hainan FA Super League	Fourth place	
D	4	Hainan FA	Sanya Qinghao	2018 Hainan FA Super League	5th	
D	5	Fujian FA	Fuzhou Hengxing	2018 Chinese Champions League	Group	
E	1	Shandong FA	Heze Caozhou	Qualified position of Weifang Juexiaoya		
E	2	Shandong FA	Zibo Origin	Qualified position of Zibo United		
E	3	Inner Mongolia FA	Hulunbuir Xinehen	2018 Chinese Champions League	Group	
E	4	Inner Mongolia FA	Ewenki Xiongying			
E	5	Dalian FA	Dalian Huayi	2017 Dalian FA Super League	7th	
E	6	Yanbian FA	Yanbian Hailanjiang			
F	1	Chengdu FA	Sichuan Top Shine	2018 Chengdu FA Super League	Runners-up	
F	2	Chengdu FA	Chengdu Decci	2018 Chinese Champions League	Group	
F	3	Chongqing FA	Chongqing Dikai	2018 Chinese Champions League	Group	
F	4	Chongqing FA	Chongqing Rich	2018 Chongqing FA Super League	Fourth place	
F	5	Shaanxi FA	Xi'an UKD	Qualified position of Shaanxi Nanqin		
G	1	Wuhan FA	Hubei Huachuang	2018 Chinese Champions League	Group	
G	2	Wuhan FA	Wuhan Freeman	2018 Chinese Champions League	Group	
G	3	Henan FA	Henan Orient Classic	2018 Henan FA Football League	Winners	
G	4	Henan FA	Luoyang Saile	2018 Henan FA Football League	Runners-up	
G	5	Shandong FA	Shandong Wangyue	Qualified position of Jinan Huaixing		
H	1	Gansu FA	Gansu Mass Ray	Qualified position of Gansu Taifeng		
H	2	Gansu FA	Lanzhou Marine Corps	2018 Gansu FA Football League	Third place	
H	3	Shaanxi FA	Yulin Caogen	2018 Shaanxi FA Super League	Runners-up	
H	4	Xi'an FA	Xi'an Yilian			
H	5	Inner Mongolia FA	Ulanqab Qile			
I	1	Xiamen FA	Xiamen Nanhu	2018 Xiamen FA Football League	10th	
I	2	Xiamen FA	Xiamen Zhenhao	2018 Xiamen FA Football League	5th	
I	3	Hubei FA	Hubei Wuhan Athletics Zaiming	2018 Chinese Champions League	Group	
I	4	Hainan FA	Hainan Wanning Tengji	2018 Hainan FA Super League	Runners-up	
I	5	Hainan FA	Lingshui Dingli Jingcheng	2018 Hainan FA Super League	Third place	
I	6	Zhejiang FA	Ningbo Yinbo	2018 Zhejiang FA Super League	Runners-up	
J	1	Nanjing FA	Nanjing Fengfan	2018 Nanjing FA Super League	8th	
J	2	Shanghai FA	Shanghai Huajiao	2018 Chinese Champions League	Group	
J	3	Shanghai FA	Shanghai Chengxun	2018 Shanghai FA Super League	Fourth place	
J	4	Anhui FA	Wuhu Longxiang	2019 Chinese Champions League (Anhui Group)	Winners	
J	5	Anhui FA	Anhui Huaqiang	2019 Chinese Champions League (Anhui Group)	Runners-up	

Source: thecfa.cn

== Regional Finals ==
=== Group A ===
Pos	Team	Pld	W	D	L	GF	GA	GD	Pts	
1	Huizhou Huixin	5	4	1	0	20	4	+16	13	Withdrew
2	Shenzhen Bogang (Q, P)	5	3	1	1	14	3	+11	10	Play-offs
3	Liuzhou Ranko	5	3	1	1	16	5	+11	10	
4	Maoming Oil City	5	2	0	3	8	19	-11	6	
5	Nanning Binjiang	5	1	0	4	5	17	-12	3	
6	MFA Development	5	0	1	4	3	18	-15	1	

Rules for classification: 1) Points; 2) Head-to-head points; 3) Head-to-head goal difference; 4) Head-to-head goals scored; 5) Goal difference; 6) Goals scored; 7) Disciplinary points (1 point for each yellow card, 3 points for each red card); 8) Draw

7 April 2019	Liuzhou Ranko	7–1	MFA Development	Wuling Stadium, Liuzhou
15:00

13 April 2019	Shenzhen Bogang	5–0	Nanning Binjiang	Shenzhen Bogang Base Stadium, Shenzhen
14:30

20 April 2019	Huizhou Huixin	7–3	Maoming Oil City	Huizhou Olympic Sports Centre, Huizhou
14:00

4 May 2019	Nanning Binjiang	1–5	Liuzhou Ranko
15:00

5 May 2019	Maoming Oil City	0–7	Shenzhen Bogang
14:00

5 May 2019	MFA Development	0–7	Huizhou Huixin
14:30

25 May 2019	Huizhou Huixin	2–0	Shenzhen Bogang
14:00

25 May 2019	Liuzhou Ranko	2–0	Maoming Oil City
14:30

25 May 2019	MFA Development	1–2	Nanning Binjiang
15:00

15 June 2019	Maoming Oil City	2–1	MFA Development
14:00

15 June 2019	Shenzhen Bogang	2–1	Liuzhou Ranko
14:30

15 June 2019	Huizhou Huixin	3–0	Nanning Binjiang
15:00

7 July 2019	Nanning Binjiang	2–3	Maoming Oil City
15:30

7 July 2019	Liuzhou Ranko	1–1	Huizhou Huixin
15:30

7 July 2019	MFA Development	0–0	Shenzhen Bogang
15:30

=== Group B ===
Pos	Team	Pld	W	D	L	GF	GA	GD	Pts	
1	Nanjing Balanta (Q)	5	5	0	0	20	2	+18	15	National Finals
2	Shanghai Jiading Boji (Q, P)	5	4	0	1	31	1	+30	12	National Finals
3	Yangzhou Huaao Fengyun	5	2	1	2	5	15	-10	7	
4	Huzhou LOHAS	5	2	0	3	9	21	-12	6	
5	Xiamen Nanxun	5	1	1	3	6	15	-9	4	
6	Jinhua Zhongchou	5	0	0	5	3	20	-17	0	

Rules for classification: 1) Points; 2) Head-to-head points; 3) Head-to-head goal difference; 4) Head-to-head goals scored; 5) Goal difference; 6) Goals scored; 7) Disciplinary points (1 point for each yellow card, 3 points for each red card); 8) Draw

21 April 2019	Nanjing Balanta	4–0	Yangzhou Huaao Fengyun	Jiangning Sports Center Stadium, Nanjing
14:00

21 April 2019	Xiamen Nanxun	0–4	Shanghai Jiading Boji	Haicang Sports Center Stadium, Xiamen
15:00

28 April 2019	Huzhou LOHAS	4–1	Jinhua Zhongchou
14:30

11 May 2019	Yangzhou Huaao Fengyun	2–1	Huzhou LOHAS
14:00

11 May 2019	Shanghai Jiading Boji	0–1	Nanjing Balanta
14:30

11 May 2019	Jinhua Zhongchou	1–3	Xiamen Nanxun
15:00

2 June 2019	Nanjing Balanta	7–0	Huzhou LOHAS
14:00

2 June 2019	Xiamen Nanxun	1–1	Yangzhou Huaao Fengyun
14:30

2 June 2019	Shanghai Jiading Boji	8–0	Jinhua Zhongchou
15:00

22 June 2019	Nanjing Balanta	3–1	Jinhua Zhongchou
15:00

23 June 2019	Yangzhou Huaao Fengyun	0–9	Shanghai Jiading Boji
14:00

23 June 2019	Huzhou LOHAS	4–1	Xiamen Nanxun
14:30

7 July 2019	Jinhua Zhongchou	0–2	Yangzhou Huaao Fengyun
15:30

7 July 2019	Xiamen Nanxun	1–5	Nanjing Balanta
15:30

7 July 2019	Shanghai Jiading Boji	10–0	Huzhou LOHAS
15:30

=== Group C ===
Pos	Team	Pld	W	D	L	GF	GA	GD	Pts	
1	Dandong Hantong (Q)	4	3	1	0	12	1	+11	10	National Finals
2	Qingdao Zhongchuang Hengtai (Q, P)	4	2	2	0	16	2	+14	8	Play-offs
3	Yingkou Chaoyue	4	2	1	1	19	4	+15	7	
4	Shanxi Zhisheng	4	1	0	3	6	19	-13	3	
5	Shanxi Jinzhihu	4	0	0	4	2	29	-27	0	

Rules for classification: 1) Points; 2) Head-to-head points; 3) Head-to-head goal difference; 4) Head-to-head goals scored; 5) Goal difference; 6) Goals scored; 7) Disciplinary points (1 point for each yellow card, 3 points for each red card); 8) Draw

27 April 2019	Yingkou Chaoyue	0–1	Dandong Hantong
14:30

28 April 2019	Shanxi Zhisheng	4–2	Shanxi Jinzhihu
14:00

19 May 2019	Shanxi Jinzhihu	0–5	Dandong Hantong
14:00

19 May 2019	Qingdao Zhongchuang Hengtai	1–1	Yingkou Chaoyue
14:30

8 June 2019	Qingdao Zhongchuang Hengtai	10–0	Shanxi Jinzhihu
14:00

8 June 2019	Dandong Hantong	5–0	Shanxi Zhisheng
14:30

29 June 2019	Shanxi Jinzhihu	0–10	Yingkou Chaoyue
14:00

29 June 2019	Shanxi Zhisheng	0–4	Qingdao Zhongchuang Hengtai
14:30

7 July 2019	Dandong Hantong	1–1	Qingdao Zhongchuang Hengtai
15:30

7 July 2019	Yingkou Chaoyue	8–2	Shanxi Zhisheng
15:30

=== Group D ===
Pos	Team	Pld	W	D	L	GF	GA	GD	Pts	
1	Zhaoqing Topfung Eastlake (Q)	4	3	1	0	18	1	+17	10	National Finals
2	Fuzhou Hengxing (Q)	4	2	2	0	11	2	+9	8	Play-offs
3	Sanya Qinghao	4	1	2	1	7	11	-4	5	
4	Qionghai Jinghaicheng	4	1	1	2	4	12	-8	4	
5	Guangzhou Glorious	4	0	0	4	0	14	-14	0	

Rules for classification: 1) Points; 2) Head-to-head points; 3) Head-to-head goal difference; 4) Head-to-head goals scored; 5) Goal difference; 6) Goals scored; 7) Disciplinary points (1 point for each yellow card, 3 points for each red card); 8) Draw

14 April 2019	Zhaoqing Topfung Eastlake	3–0	Guangzhou Glorious	Zhaoqing University NO.1 Stadium, Zhaoqing
10:00

14 April 2019	Qionghai Jinghaicheng	1–1	Sanya Qinghao	Zhaoqing Sports Center Stadium, Zhaoqing
10:30

15 April 2019	Guangzhou Glorious	0–3	Sanya Qinghao	Zhaoqing University NO.1 Stadium, Zhaoqing
14:30

15 April 2019	Fuzhou Hengxing	4–0	Qionghai Jinghaicheng	Zhaoqing Sports Center Stadium, Zhaoqing
15:00

17 April 2019	Fuzhou Hengxing	5–0	Guangzhou Glorious	Zhaoqing University NO.1 Stadium, Zhaoqing
10:00

17 April 2019	Sanya Qinghao	1–8	Zhaoqing Topfung Eastlake	Zhaoqing Sports Center Stadium, Zhaoqing
10:30

18 April 2019	Guangzhou Glorious	0–3	Qionghai Jinghaicheng	Zhaoqing University NO.1 Stadium, Zhaoqing
15:00

18 April 2019	Zhaoqing Topfung Eastlake	0–0	Fuzhou Hengxing	Zhaoqing Sports Center Stadium, Zhaoqing
15:00

20 April 2019	Sanya Qinghao	2–2	Fuzhou Hengxing	Zhaoqing University NO.1 Stadium, Zhaoqing
15:00

20 April 2019	Qionghai Jinghaicheng	0–7	Zhaoqing Topfung Eastlake	Zhaoqing Sports Center Stadium, Zhaoqing
15:00

=== Group E ===
Pos	Team	Pld	W	D	L	GF	GA	GD	Pts	
1	Heze Caozhou (Q)	4	3	1	0	19	3	+16	10	National Finals
2	Yanbian Hailanjiang (Q)	4	3	1	0	8	2	+6	10	National Finals
3	Zibo Origin	4	1	1	2	9	16	-7	4	
4	Hulunbuir Xinehen	4	1	0	3	5	13	-8	3	
5	Ewenki Xiongying	4	0	1	3	9	16	-7	1	
–	Dalian Huayi	–	–	–	–	–	–	–	–	Withdrew

Rules for classification: 1) Points; 2) Head-to-head points; 3) Head-to-head goal difference; 4) Head-to-head goals scored; 5) Goal difference; 6) Goals scored; 7) Disciplinary points (1 point for each yellow card, 3 points for each red card); 8) Draw

28 April 2019	Heze Caozhou	7–0	Zibo Origin
10:00

28 April 2019	Hulunbuir Xinehen	3–2	Ewenki Xiongying
14:30

29 April 2019	Ewenki Xiongying	1–3	Heze Caozhou
14:30

29 April 2019	Yanbian Hailanjiang	1–0	Hulunbuir Xinehen
15:00

1 May 2019	Hulunbuir Xinehen	2–3	Zibo Origin
10:30

1 May 2019	Ewenki Xiongying	0–4	Yanbian Hailanjiang
14:30

2 May 2019	Zibo Origin	6–6	Ewenki Xiongying
14:30

2 May 2019	Heze Caozhou	2–2	Yanbian Hailanjiang
15:00

4 May 2019	Yanbian Hailanjiang	1–0	Zibo Origin

4 May 2019	Hulunbuir Xinehen	0–7	Heze Caozhou

=== Group F ===
Pos	Team	Pld	W	D	L	GF	GA	GD	Pts	
1	Xi'an UKD (Q, P)	4	4	0	0	20	1	+19	12	National Finals
2	Chongqing Rich (Q)	4	2	1	1	6	9	-3	7	Play-offs
3	Sichuan Top Shine	4	1	2	1	9	9	0	5	
4	Chengdu Decci	4	0	2	2	8	13	-5	2	
5	Chongqing Dikai	4	0	1	3	6	17	-11	1	

Rules for classification: 1) Points; 2) Head-to-head points; 3) Head-to-head goal difference; 4) Head-to-head goals scored; 5) Goal difference; 6) Goals scored; 7) Disciplinary points (1 point for each yellow card, 3 points for each red card); 8) Draw

12 May 2019	Sichuan Top Shine	2–2	Chengdu Decci
10:00

12 May 2019	Chongqing Dikai	1–2	Chongqing Rich
10:30

13 May 2019	Chengdu Decci	2–3	Chongqing Rich
14:30

13 May 2019	Xi'an UKD	6–0	Chongqing Dikai
15:00

15 May 2019	Xi'an UKD	4–0	Chengdu Decci
10:00

15 May 2019	Chongqing Rich	1–1	Sichuan Top Shine
10:30

16 May 2019	Chengdu Decci	4–4	Chongqing Dikai
15:00

16 May 2019	Sichuan Top Shine	1–5	Xi'an UKD
15:00

18 May 2019	Chongqing Rich	0–5	Xi'an UKD
15:00

18 May 2019	Chongqing Dikai	1–5	Sichuan Top Shine
15:00

=== Group G ===
Pos	Team	Pld	W	D	L	GF	GA	GD	Pts	
1	Hubei Huachuang (Q)	4	3	1	0	14	3	+11	10	National Finals
2	Shandong Wangyue (Q)	4	2	2	0	9	1	+8	8	Play-offs
3	Wuhan Freeman	4	1	2	1	10	6	+4	5	
4	Henan Orient Classic	4	1	1	2	3	8	-5	4	
5	Luoyang Saile	4	0	0	4	2	20	-18	0	

Rules for classification: 1) Points; 2) Head-to-head points; 3) Head-to-head goal difference; 4) Head-to-head goals scored; 5) Goal difference; 6) Goals scored; 7) Disciplinary points (1 point for each yellow card, 3 points for each red card); 8) Draw

26 May 2019	Hubei Huachuang	4–2	Wuhan Freeman
10:00

26 May 2019	Henan Orient Classic	1–0	Luoyang Saile
10:30

27 May 2019	Wuhan Freeman	6–0	Luoyang Saile
14:30

27 May 2019	Shandong Wangyue	5–0	Henan Orient Classic
15:00

29 May 2019	Shandong Wangyue	0–0	Wuhan Freeman
10:00

29 May 2019	Luoyang Saile	1–9	Hubei Huachuang
10:30

30 May 2019	Wuhan Freeman	2–2	Henan Orient Classic
15:00

30 May 2019	Hubei Huachuang	0–0	Shandong Wangyue
15:00

1 June 2019	Luoyang Saile	1–4	Shandong Wangyue
15:00

1 June 2019	Henan Orient Classic	0–1	Hubei Huachuang
15:00

=== Group H ===
Pos	Team	Pld	W	D	L	GF	GA	GD	Pts	
1	Xi'an Yilian (Q)	4	4	0	0	17	3	+14	12	National Finals
2	Gansu Mass Ray (Q)	4	3	0	1	21	5	+16	9	Play-offs
3	Yulin Caogen	4	1	1	2	8	17	-9	4	
4	Lanzhou Marine Corps	4	0	2	2	7	17	-10	2	
5	Ulanqab Qile	4	0	1	3	4	15	-11	1	

Rules for classification: 1) Points; 2) Head-to-head points; 3) Head-to-head goal difference; 4) Head-to-head goals scored; 5) Goal difference; 6) Goals scored; 7) Disciplinary points (1 point for each yellow card, 3 points for each red card); 8) Draw

3 June 2019	Gansu Mass Ray	7–1	Lanzhou Marine Corps
10:00

3 June 2019	Yulin Caogen	1–4	Xi'an Yilian
10:30

4 June 2019	Lanzhou Marine Corps	0–4	Xi'an Yilian
14:30

4 June 2019	Ulanqab Qile	1–2	Yulin Caogen
15:00

6 June 2019	Ulanqab Qile	2–2	Lanzhou Marine Corps
10:00

6 June 2019	Xi'an Yilian	3–1	Gansu Mass Ray
10:30

7 June 2019	Lanzhou Marine Corps	4–4	Yulin Caogen
15:00

7 June 2019	Gansu Mass Ray	5–0	Ulanqab Qile
15:00

9 June 2019	Xi'an Yilian	6–1	Ulanqab Qile
15:00

9 June 2019	Yulin Caogen	1–8	Gansu Mass Ray
15:00

=== Group I ===
Pos	Team	Pld	W	D	L	GF	GA	GD	Pts	
1	Lingshui Dingli Jingcheng (Q)	4	3	1	0	14	6	+8	10	National Finals
2	Hubei Wuhan Athletics Zaiming (Q)	4	2	2	0	13	4	+9	8	Play-offs
3	Hainan Wanning Tengji	4	2	0	2	10	11	-1	6	
4	Ningbo Yinbo	4	1	1	2	6	8	-2	4	
5	Xiamen Zhenhao	4	0	0	4	2	16	-14	0	
–	Xiamen Nanhu	–	–	–	–	–	–	–	–	Withdrew

Rules for classification: 1) Points; 2) Head-to-head points; 3) Head-to-head goal difference; 4) Head-to-head goals scored; 5) Goal difference; 6) Goals scored; 7) Disciplinary points (1 point for each yellow card, 3 points for each red card); 8) Draw

24 June 2019	Hubei Wuhan Athletics Zaiming	1–1	Ningbo Yinbo
10:30

24 June 2019	Hainan Wanning Tengji	1–3	Lingshui Dingli Jingcheng
14:30

25 June 2019	Xiamen Zhenhao	0–4	Hubei Wuhan Athletics Zaiming
10:30

25 June 2019	Ningbo Yinbo	1–4	Hainan Wanning Tengji
15:00

27 June 2019	Hainan Wanning Tengji	4–1	Xiamen Zhenhao
10:30

27 June 2019	Lingshui Dingli Jingcheng	3–2	Ningbo Yinbo
14:30

28 June 2019	Hubei Wuhan Athletics Zaiming	6–1	Hainan Wanning Tengji
10:30

28 June 2019	Xiamen Zhenhao	1–6	Lingshui Dingli Jingcheng
14:30

30 June 2019	Ningbo Yinbo	2–0	Xiamen Zhenhao
9:00

30 June 2019	Lingshui Dingli Jingcheng	2–2	Hubei Wuhan Athletics Zaiming
15:30

=== Group J ===
Pos	Team	Pld	W	D	L	GF	GA	GD	Pts	
1	Nanjing Fengfan (Q, C, P)	4	4	0	0	26	0	+26	12	National Finals
2	Shanghai Huajiao (Q)	4	2	1	1	25	4	+21	7	Play-offs
3	Shanghai Chengxun	4	2	1	1	10	8	+2	7	
4	Wuhu Longxiang	4	1	0	3	9	22	-13	3	
5	Anhui Huaqiang	4	0	0	4	5	41	-36	0	

Rules for classification: 1) Points; 2) Head-to-head points; 3) Head-to-head goal difference; 4) Head-to-head goals scored; 5) Goal difference; 6) Goals scored; 7) Disciplinary points (1 point for each yellow card, 3 points for each red card); 8) Draw

1 July 2019	Anhui Huaqiang	1–8	Wuhu Longxiang
10:00

1 July 2019	Shanghai Chengxun	1–1	Shanghai Huajiao
10:30

2 July 2019	Wuhu Longxiang	0–6	Shanghai Huajiao
14:30

2 July 2019	Nanjing Fengfan	4–0	Shanghai Chengxun
15:00

4 July 2019	Nanjing Fengfan	11–0	Wuhu Longxiang
10:00

4 July 2019	Shanghai Huajiao	18–2	Anhui Huaqiang
10:00

5 July 2019	Wuhu Longxiang	1–4	Shanghai Chengxun
15:00

5 July 2019	Anhui Huaqiang	0–10	Nanjing Fengfan
15:00

7 July 2019	Shanghai Huajiao	0–1	Nanjing Fengfan
15:30

7 July 2019	Shanghai Chengxun	5–2	Anhui Huaqiang
15:30

=== Ranking of runner-up teams ===
Pos	Group	Team	Pld	W	D	L	GF	GA	GD	Pts	
1	E	Yanbian Hailanjiang	4	3	1	0	8	2	+6	10	National Finals
2	B	Shanghai Jiading Boji	4	3	0	1	23	1	+22	9	National Finals
3	H	Gansu Mass Ray	4	3	0	1	21	5	+16	9	Play-offs
4	A	Shenzhen Bogang	4	3	0	1	14	3	+11	9	Play-offs
5	C	Qingdao Zhongchuang Hengtai	4	2	2	0	16	2	+14	8	Play-offs
6	I	Hubei Wuhan Athletics Zaiming	4	2	2	0	13	4	+9	8	Play-offs
7	D	Fuzhou Hengxing	4	2	2	0	11	2	+9	8	Play-offs
8	G	Shandong Wangyue	4	2	2	0	9	1	+8	8	Play-offs
9	J	Shanghai Huajiao	4	2	1	1	25	4	+21	7	Play-offs
10	F	Chongqing Rich	4	2	1	1	6	9	-3	7	Play-offs

=== Play-offs ===
13 July 2019	Gansu Mass Ray	1–1 (3–1 p)	Chongqing Rich	Lanzhou Jiaotong University Football Field, Lanzhou
15:30

13 July 2019	Shenzhen Bogang	3–0	Shanghai Huajiao	Shenzhen Bogang Football Base, Shenzhen
16:00

14 July 2019	Qingdao Zhongchuang Hengtai	0–1	Shandong Wangyue	Haiyang Lihao Sports Center, Haiyang
16:00

14 July 2019	Hubei Wuhan Athletics Zaiming	2–1	Fuzhou Hengxing	Huangshi Stadium, Huangshi
16:30

== National Finals ==
=== Qualified teams ===
Groups	Club	Head coach	City	Stadium	Capacity	Position
North	Nanjing Fengfan	(China) Yin Youyou	Nanjing	Football Field at Nanjing University		
North	Xi'an UKD	(China) Huang Hongyi	Xi'an	Football Field at Xi’an Polytechnic University		
North	Xi'an Yilian	(China) Huang Qixiang	Xi'an	Football Field at Xi'an Urban Architectural College		
North	Heze Caozhou	(South Korea) Jeong Hyun-ho	Heze (playing in Shan County)	Shan County Nationwide Fitness Centre		
North	Dandong Hantong	(China) Wei Shili	Dandong (playing in Zhuanghe)	Football Field at Liaoning Normal University Haihua College		
North	Yanbian Hailanjiang	(China) Li Zaihao	Longjing	Longjing Hailanjiang Football Town Football Field		
North	Gansu Mass Ray	(China) Liu Wei	Lanzhou	Football Field at Lanzhou Vocational College of Sports		
North	Shandong Wangyue	(China) Song Lihui	Jinan (playing in Tai'an)	Tai'an Sports Center		
South	Nanjing Balanta	(China) Liu Hongtao	Nanjing	Jiangning Sports Center		
South	Zhaoqing Topfung Eastlake	(China) Wang Di	Zhaoqing	Zhaoqing Sports Center		
South	Hubei Huachuang	(China) Liu Bo	Wuhan	Football Field at National Prosecutors College of P.R.C at Hubei		
South	Lingshui Dingli Jingcheng	(China) Huang Chong	Lingshui (playing in Haikou)	Hainan Sport School Stadium		
South	Shanghai Jiading Boji	(China) Wang Hongliang	Shanghai	Jiading Stadium		
South	Shenzhen Bogang	(Hong Kong) Li Haiqiang	Shenzhen	Shenzhen Bogang Football Base		
South	Hubei Wuhan Athletics Zaiming	(China) Zhao Peng	Wuhan (playing in Huangshi)	Huangshi Stadium		
South	Qingdao Zhongchuang Hengtai	(China) Zhou Xin	Qingdao	Qingdao Guoxin Stadium Outer Field		

=== North Group ===
Pos	Team	Pld	W	D	L	GF	GA	GD	Pts	
1	Nanjing Fengfan (P)	7	7	0	0	23	2	+21	21	China League Two
2	Xi'an UKD (Q)	7	4	1	2	14	5	+9	13	Play-offs
3	Xi'an Yilian (Q)	7	4	1	2	12	7	+5	13	Play-offs
4	Heze Caozhou (Q)	7	4	1	2	11	10	+1	13	Play-offs
5	Shandong Wangyue (Q)	7	3	1	3	9	12	-3	10	Play-offs
6	Dandong Hantong	7	2	1	4	6	12	-6	7	
7	Gansu Mass Ray	7	1	0	6	8	21	-13	3	
8	Yanbian Hailanjiang	7	0	1	6	2	16	-14	1	

17 August 2019	Dandong Hantong	3–1	Gansu Mass Ray	Football Field at Liaoning Normal University Haihua College, Dalian
16:00

17 August 2019	Xi'an Yilian	1–0	Xi'an UKD	Football Field at Xi'an Urban Architectural College, Xi'an
16:00

17 August 2019	Heze Caozhou	2–1	Shandong Wangyue	Shan County Nationwide Fitness Centre, Heze
16:30

17 August 2019	Yanbian Hailanjiang	0–2	Nanjing Fengfan	Longjing Hailanjiang Football Town Football Field, Yanbian
15:30

24 August 2019	Xi'an Yilian	4–0	Shandong Wangyue
:

24 August 2019	Dandong Hantong	0–3	Nanjing Fengfan
:

24 August 2019	Xi'an UKD	5–0	Gansu Mass Ray
:

24 August 2019	Heze Caozhou	0–0	Yanbian Hailanjiang
:

31 August 2019	Nanjing Fengfan	3–1	Heze Caozhou
:

31 August 2019	Shandong Wangyue	1–0	Dandong Hantong
:

31 August 2019	Xi'an UKD	1–0	Yanbian Hailanjiang
:

31 August 2019	Gansu Mass Ray	1–2	Xi'an Yilian
:

7 September 2019	Yanbian Hailanjiang	1–2	Dandong Hantong
:

7 September 2019	Nanjing Fengfan	3–0	Xi'an Yilian
:

7 September 2019	Shandong Wangyue	2–0	Gansu Mass Ray
:

7 September 2019	Heze Caozhou	0–4	Xi'an UKD
:

14 September 2019	Xi'an UKD	1–1	Shandong Wangyue
:

14 September 2019	Xi'an Yilian	3–0	Yanbian Hailanjiang
:

14 September 2019	Gansu Mass Ray	0–5	Nanjing Fengfan
:

14 September 2019	Dandong Hantong	0–2	Heze Caozhou
:

21 September 2019	Shandong Wangyue	3–1	Yanbian Hailanjiang
:

21 September 2019	Gansu Mass Ray	1–4	Heze Caozhou
:

21 September 2019	Nanjing Fengfan	3–0	Xi'an UKD
:

21 September 2019	Xi'an Yilian	1–1	Dandong Hantong
:

28 September 2019	Xi'an UKD	3–0	Dandong Hantong
:

28 September 2019	Heze Caozhou	2–1	Xi'an Yilian
:

28 September 2019	Yanbian Hailanjiang	0–5	Gansu Mass Ray
:

28 September 2019	Nanjing Fengfan	4–1	Shandong Wangyue
:

=== South Group ===
Pos	Team	Pld	W	D	L	GF	GA	GD	Pts	
1	Shenzhen Bogang (P)	7	5	1	1	16	8	+8	16	China League Two
2	Nanjing Balanta (Q)	7	5	1	1	14	6	+8	16	Play-offs
3	Shanghai Jiading Boji (Q)	7	4	2	1	9	7	+2	14	Play-offs
4	Hubei Huachuang (Q)	7	2	4	1	12	11	+1	10	Play-offs
5	Qingdao Zhongchuang Hengtai (Q)	7	3	1	3	11	11	0	10	Play-offs
6	Hubei Wuhan Athletics Zaiming	7	1	2	4	5	12	-7	5	
7	Zhaoqing Topfung Eastlake	7	1	1	5	10	12	-2	4	
8	Lingshui Dingli Jingcheng	7	0	2	5	7	17	-10	2	

18 August 2019	Lingshui Dingli Jingcheng	0–2	Shenzhen Bogang
:

18 August 2019	Qingdao Zhongchuang Hengtai	1–0	Zhaoqing Topfung Eastlake
:

18 August 2019	Hubei Huachuang	0–0	Hubei Wuhan Athletics Zaiming
:

18 August 2019	Shanghai Jiading Boji	0–0	Nanjing Balanta
:

25 August 2019	Qingdao Zhongchuang Hengtai	3–0	Hubei Wuhan Athletics Zaiming
:

25 August 2019	Lingshui Dingli Jingcheng	1–2	Nanjing Balanta
:

25 August 2019	Zhaoqing Topfung Eastlake	2–3	Shenzhen Bogang
:

25 August 2019	Hubei Huachuang	3–0	Shanghai Jiading Boji
:

1 September 2019	Nanjing Balanta	3–0	Hubei Huachuang
:

1 September 2019	Hubei Wuhan Athletics Zaiming	1–1	Lingshui Dingli Jingcheng
:

1 September 2019	Zhaoqing Topfung Eastlake	1–1	Shanghai Jiading Boji
:

1 September 2019	Shenzhen Bogang	1–0	Qingdao Zhongchuang Hengtai
:

8 September 2019	Shanghai Jiading Boji	3–1	Lingshui Dingli Jingcheng
:

8 September 2019	Nanjing Balanta	3–0	Qingdao Zhongchuang Hengtai
:

8 September 2019	Hubei Wuhan Athletics Zaiming	0–2	Shenzhen Bogang
:

8 September 2019	Hubei Huachuang	2–1	Zhaoqing Topfung Eastlake
:

15 September 2019	Zhaoqing Topfung Eastlake	1–3	Hubei Wuhan Athletics Zaiming
:

15 September 2019	Qingdao Zhongchuang Hengtai	1–2	Shanghai Jiading Boji
:

15 September 2019	Shenzhen Bogang	3–0	Nanjing Balanta
:

15 September 2019	Lingshui Dingli Jingcheng	1–1	Hubei Huachuang
:

22 September 2019	Hubei Wuhan Athletics Zaiming	0–1	Shanghai Jiading Boji
:

22 September 2019	Shenzhen Bogang	4–4	Hubei Huachuang
:

22 September 2019	Nanjing Balanta	2–1	Zhaoqing Topfung Eastlake
:

22 September 2019	Lingshui Dingli Jingcheng	3–4	Qingdao Zhongchuang Hengtai
:

28 September 2019	Zhaoqing Topfung Eastlake	4–0	Lingshui Dingli Jingcheng
:

28 September 2019	Hubei Huachuang	2–2	Qingdao Zhongchuang Hengtai
:

28 September 2019	Shanghai Jiading Boji	2–1	Shenzhen Bogang
:

28 September 2019	Nanjing Balanta	4–1	Hubei Wuhan Athletics Zaiming
:

=== Overall table ===
Pos	Team	Pld	W	D	L	GF	GA	GD	Pts	
1	Nanjing Fengfan (C, P)	7	7	0	0	23	2	+21	21	China League Two
2	Shenzhen Bogang (P)	7	5	1	1	16	8	+8	16	China League Two
3	Shandong Wangyue	7	3	1	3	9	12	-3	10	China League Two
4	Xi'an UKD (P)	7	4	1	2	14	5	+9	13	China League Two
5	Shanghai Jiading Boji (Q, P)	7	4	2	1	9	7	+2	14	Promotion Play-offs
6	Hubei Huachuang (Q)	7	2	4	1	12	11	+1	10	Promotion Play-offs
7	Nanjing Balanta	7	5	1	1	14	6	+8	16	
8	Qingdao Zhongchuang Hengtai (P)	7	3	1	3	11	11	0	10	
9	Xi'an Yilian	7	4	1	2	12	7	+5	13	
10	Heze Caozhou	7	4	1	2	11	10	+1	13	
11	Dandong Hantong	7	2	1	4	6	12	-6	7	
12	Hubei Wuhan Athletics Zaiming	7	1	2	4	5	12	-7	5	
13	Zhaoqing Topfung Eastlake	7	1	1	5	10	12	-2	4	
14	Gansu Mass Ray	7	1	0	6	8	21	-13	3	
15	Lingshui Dingli Jingcheng	7	0	2	5	7	17	-10	2	
16	Yanbian Hailanjiang	7	0	1	6	2	16	-14	1	

(C) Champion; (P) Promoted; (Q) Qualified to the phase indicated;

=== Play-offs ===
==== 3rd-10th Place ====
5 October 2019	Xi'an UKD	2–1	Qingdao Zhongchuang Hengtai
15:30

5 October 2019	Shanghai Jiading Boji	1–1 (5–4 p)	Heze Caozhou
15:30

6 October 2019	Xi'an Yilian	0–0 (4–5 p)	Hubei Huachuang
15:00

6 October 2019	Nanjing Balanta	1–1 (4–5 p)	Shandong Wangyue
15:30

==== 7th-10th Place ====
13 October 2019	Heze Caozhou	0–1	Qingdao Zhongchuang Hengtai
14:00

13 October 2019	Nanjing Balanta	2–1	Xi'an Yilian
14:30

==== 3rd-6th Place ====
The two winners of this round will be directly promoted to 2020 China League Two.

13 October 2019	Xi'an UKD	0–0 (4–3 p)	Shanghai Jiading Boji
15:00

13 October 2019	Hubei Huachuang	2–2 (1–4 p)	Shandong Wangyue
15:00

==== 9th-10th Place ====
20 October 2019	Xi'an Yilian	2–1	Heze Caozhou
15:00

==== 7th-8th Place ====
18 October 2019	Nanjing Balanta	1–1 (5–3 p)	Qingdao Zhongchuang Hengtai
14:30

==== 5th-6th Place ====
21 October 2019	Shanghai Jiading Boji	3–1	Hubei Huachuang
19:00

==== 3rd-4th Place ====
20 October 2019	Xi'an UKD	1–1 (2–3 p)	Shandong Wangyue
15:00

=== Final ===
==== 1st leg ====
19 October 2019	Shenzhen Bogang	2–1	Nanjing Fengfan
15:00

==== 2nd leg ====
9 November 2019	Nanjing Fengfan	4–1	Shenzhen Bogang
14:00

Nanjing Fengfan won 5–3 on aggregate.
