= 2021 China League Two =

2021 season of third division Chinese association football

China League Two
- Season: 2021
- Dates: 15 May - 4 December
- Champions: Qingdao Hainiu
- Promoted: Qingdao Hainiu; Hebei Kungfu; Guangxi Pingguo Haliao; Qingdao Youth Island; Shanghai Jiading Huilong
- Relegated: Shaoxing Keqiao Yuejia; Shaanxi Warriors Beyond
- Matches: 280
- Goals: 629 (2.25 per match)
- Top goalscorer: Li Kai (14 goals)
- Biggest home win: Qingdao Hainiu 6–0 Kunming Zheng He Shipman (21 May 2021)
- Biggest away win: Hunan Billows 0–5 Sichuan Minzu (27 July 2021)
- Highest scoring: Qingdao Hainiu 6–0 Kunming Zheng He Shipman (21 May 2021); Guangxi Pingguo Haliao 5–1 Shaoxing Keqiao Yuejia (4 June 2021); Dandong Tengyue 1–5 Guangxi Pingguo Haliao (2 July 2021); Dongguan United 5–1 Kunming Zheng He Shipman (28 July 2021); Qingdao Hainiu 5–1 Xiamen Egret Island (19 September 2021); Kunming Zheng He Shipman 4–2 Xi'an Wolves (4 November 2021); Shaanxi Warriors Beyond 1–5 Hubei Istar (29 November 2021)
- Longest winning run: 7 matches Xiamen Egret Island
- Longest unbeaten run: 18 matches Qingdao Hainiu
- Longest winless run: 15 matches Yanbian Longding
- Longest losing run: 14 matches Hubei Istar

The 2021 Chinese Football Association Division Two League season was the 32nd season since its establishment in 1989.

== Team changes ==
=== To League Two ===
Teams promoted from 2020 Chinese Champions League

- Guangdong Lianghetang
- Xiamen Qudian
- Sichuan Huakun
- Yichun Jiangxi Tungsten Grand Tiger
- Hebei Jingying Zhihai
- Wuxi Xinje
- Quanzhou Addarmour
- Yanbian Hailanjiang
- Dandong Hantong

=== From League Two ===
Teams promoted to 2021 China League One

- Wuhan Three Towns
- Zibo Cuju
- Nanjing City
- Beijing BIT

Dissolved entries

- ~~Jiangsu Yancheng Dingli~~
- ~~Shenzhen Bogang~~

=== Name changes ===
Ahead of the 2021 season, the Chinese Football Association ordered all clubs to eliminate any corporate references in their names.

- Hubei Chufeng United F.C. changed their name to Hubei Istar in January 2021.
- Qingdao Zhongchuang Hengtai F.C. changed their name to Qingdao Youth Island in January 2021.
- Xiamen Qudian F.C. changed their name to Xiamen Egret Island in January 2021.
- Yunnan Kunlu F.C. changed their name to Kunming Zheng He Shipman in January 2021.
- Qingdao Jonoon F.C. changed their name to Qingdao Hainiu in January 2021.
- Xi'an Daxing Chongde F.C. changed their name to Xi'an Wolves in February 2021.
- Guangxi Baoyun F.C. changed their name to Guangxi Pingguo Haliao in February 2021.
- Guangdong Lianghetang F.C. changed their name to Dongguan United in February 2021.
- Xi'an UKD F.C. changed their name to Shaanxi Warriors Beyond in March 2021.
- Hebei Aoli Jingying F.C. changed their name to Hebei Zhuoao in March 2021.
- Hebei Jingying Zhihai F.C. changed their name to Hebei Kungfu in March 2021.
- Wuxi Xinje F.C. changed their name to Wuxi Wugou in March 2021.
- Shanghai Jiading Boji F.C. changed their name to Shanghai Jiading Huilong in March 2021.
- Zhejiang Yiteng F.C. changed their name to Shaoxing Keqiao Yuejia in March 2021.
- Sichuan Huakun F.C. changed their name to Sichuan Minzu in March 2021.
- Yichun Jiangxi Tungsten Grand Tiger F.C. changed their name to Yichun Grand Tiger in March 2021.
- Quanzhou Addarmour F.C. changed their name to Quanzhou Yassin in March 2021.
- Yanbian Hailanjiang F.C. changed their name to Yanbian Longding in March 2021.
- Dandong Hantong F.C. changed their name to Dandong Tengyue in March 2021.

== Clubs ==
=== Stadiums and Locations ===
Team	Head coach	City	Stadium	Capacity	2020 season
Hubei Istar	(China) Gao Feng (caretaker)	Wuhan	Xiaogan Sports Centre Stadium	27,000	5th
Qingdao Hainiu	(China) Yin Tiesheng	Qingdao	Qingdao Tiantai Stadium	20,525	6th
Shanghai Jiading Huilong	(China) Wang Hongliang	Shanghai	Jiading Stadium	9,704	7th
Qingdao Youth Island	(China) Zhou Xin	Qingdao		N/A	8th
Kunming Zheng He Shipman	(China) He Yunqun (caretaker)	Kunming			9th
Shaoxing Keqiao Yuejia	(China) Wang Jun	Shaoxing	China Textile City Sports Center	40,000	11th
Xi'an Wolves	(China) Wang Bo	Xi'an	Northwestern Polytechnical University (Chang'an Campus) Stadium	N/A	12th
Shaanxi Warriors Beyond	(China) Zhang Jun	Xi'an			13th
Qingdao Red Lions	(China) Li Yinan (caretaker)	Laixi	Laixi Sports Center	12,000	14th
Hunan Billows	(China) Jia Hong	Changsha	Yiyang Olympic Sports Park Stadium	30,000	15th
Hebei Zhuoao	(China) Li Bin	Shijiazhuang		33,572	16th
Guangxi Pingguo Haliao	(China) Yang Lin	Pingguo			17th
Inner Mongolia Caoshangfei	(North Macedonia) Ivica Cvetanovski	Baotou	Baotou Olympic Sports Centre Stadium	40,545	18th
Dongguan United ^{P}	(China) Wang Helong	Dongguan			CMCL, 1st
Xiamen Egret Island ^{P}	(China) Zang Haili	Xiamen	Xiamen Stadium	32,000	CMCL, 2nd
Sichuan Minzu ^{P}	(China) Sun Xiaoxuan	Chengdu			CMCL, 3rd
Yichun Grand Tiger ^{P}	(China) Zhang Yun	Yichun			CMCL, 4th
Shanxi Longjin	(Serbia) Bojan Pavlović	Taiyuan	Shanxi Sports Centre Stadium	62,000	20th
Hebei Kungfu ^{P}	(China) Zhang Hui	Shijiazhuang			CMCL, 5th
Wuxi Wugou ^{P}	(China) Qin Kai	Wuxi			CMCL, 6th
Quanzhou Yassin ^{P}	(China) Gao Daming	Quanzhou			CMCL, 7th
Yanbian Longding ^{P}	(China) Jin Huirong	Longjing			CMCL, 8th
Dandong Tengyue ^{P}	(North Korea) Kwon Ryong-jun	Dandong			CMCL, 9th
China U-20	(China) Cheng Yaodong		Jinshan Sports Centre	30,000	Invited team

=== Clubs Locations ===
Location of teams in 2021 China League Two

=== Managerial changes ===
Team	Outgoing manager	Manner of departure	Date of vacancy	Position in table	Incoming manager	Date of appointment
Xiamen Egret Island	(China) Yang Lin	Mutual consent	31 January 2021	Pre-season	(China) Zang Haili	1 February 2021
Guangxi Pingguo Haliao	(China) Han Zhenyuan	Mutual consent	26 April 2021	Pre-season	(China) Yang Lin	26 April 2021
Shanghai Jiading Huilong	(Spain) Nahum Mingol Ribes	Mutual consent	June 2021	1st, Group C	(China) Wang Hongliang	June 2021
Xi'an Wolves	(China) Tang Xiaofei	Mutual consent	June/July 2021	2nd, Group A	(China) Wang Bo	June/July 2021
Kunming Zheng He Shipman	(China) Shi Jun (caretaker)	Signed by Hebei Kungfu as player	2 July 2021	8th, Group B	(China) Cui Yan	2 July 2021
Hubei Istar	(China) Chen Fangping	Mutual consent	July 2021	8th, Group A	(China) Zhou Rui	July 2021
Kunming Zheng He Shipman	(China) Cui Yan	Mutual consent		8th, Group B	(China) He Yunqun (caretaker)	
Hubei Istar	(China) Zhou Rui	Mutual consent			(China) Gao Feng (caretaker)	
Qingdao Red Lions	(Spain) Raul Cañete Lozano	Mutual consent	5 November 2021	6th, Group E	(China) Li Yinan (caretaker)	5 November 2021

== Centralised venues ==
- Group A: Duyun, Guizhou
- Group B: Yancheng, Jiangsu
- Group C: Luxi, Yunnan

== First stage ==
=== Group A ===
==== League table ====
Pos	Team	Pld	W	D	L	GF	GA	GD	Pts	Promotion, qualification or relegation
1	Shanxi Longjin	14	9	5	0	25	8	+17	32	Qualification for Promotion stage
2	Guangxi Pingguo Haliao	14	8	4	2	29	11	+18	28	Qualification for Promotion stage
3	Hebei Kungfu	14	8	2	4	18	10	+8	26	Qualification for Promotion stage
4	Xi'an Wolves	14	6	4	4	20	12	+8	22	Qualification for Relegation stage Group F
5	Shaoxing Keqiao Yuejia	14	5	3	6	14	16	−2	18	Qualification for Relegation stage Group F
6	Inner Mongolia Caoshangfei	14	4	1	9	16	20	−4	13 (Note: Head-to-head results: Inner Mongolia Caoshangfei 1–2 Dandong Tengyue, Dandong Tengyue 0–3 Inner Mongolia Caoshangfei.)	Qualification for Relegation stage Group F
7	Dandong Tengyue	14	3	4	7	12	29	−17	13	Qualification for Relegation stage Group E
8	Hubei Istar	14	1	1	12	3	31	−28	4	Qualification for Relegation stage Group E

Rules for classification:
- During season: 1) Points; 2) Goal difference; 3) Goals scored
- After season: 1) Points; 2) Head-to-head points; 3) Head-to-head goal difference; 4) Head-to-head goals scored; 5) Goal difference; 6) Goals scored; 7) Disciplinary points (1 point for each yellow card, 3 points for each red card); 8) Draw
  Notes:

==== Results ====
Home \ Away	DDT	GPH	HBK	HBI	IMC	SXL	SKY	XAW
Dandong Tengyue	—	1–5	0–1	1–1	0–3	1–1	0–3	0–4
Guangxi Pingguo Haliao	1–1	—	1–1	2–1	3–1	2–2	5–1	0–1
Hebei Kungfu	1–2	0–1	—	2–0	2–1	0–1	1–0	3–1
Hubei Istar	0–2	0–3	0–3	—	1–0	0–3	0–1	0–3
Inner Mongolia Caoshangfei	1–2	0–2	2–1	3–0	—	0–2	0–2	1–2
Shanxi Longjin	4–0	1–0	1–1	2–0	2–1	—	2–2	2–1
Shaoxing Keqiao Yuejia	2–0	0–3	0–1	2–0	1–1	0–2	—	0–1
Xi'an Wolves	2–2	1–1	0–1	4–0	0–2	0–0	0–0	—

Legend: Blue = home team win; Yellow = draw; Red = away team win.
For upcoming matches, an "a" indicates there is an article about the rivalry between the two participants.

==== Positions by round ====
To preserve chronological evolvements, any postponed matches are not included to the round at which they were originally scheduled, but added to the full round they were played immediately afterwards. For example, if a match is scheduled for round 7, but then played between rounds 8 and 9, it will be added to the standings for round 8.

Team ╲ Round	1	2	3	4	5	6	7	8	9	10	11	12	13	14
Shanxi Longjin	6	2	2	2	2	1	1	1	1	1	1	1	1	1
Guangxi Pingguo Haliao	7	7	4	3	1	4	3	3	2	2	2	2	3	2
Hebei Kungfu	4	1	3	5	5	3	4	4	3	3	3	3	2	3
Xi'an Wolves	2	5	6	4	4	2	2	2	4	4	4	4	4	4
Shaoxing Keqiao Yuejia	1	4	1	1	3	5	5	5	5	5	5	5	5	5
Inner Mongolia Caoshangfei	8	8	7	8	8	8	8	7	7	7	7	6	6	6
Dandong Tengyue	3	6	8	7	6	6	6	6	6	6	6	7	7	7
Hubei Istar	5	3	5	6	7	7	7	8	8	8	8	8	8	8

Qualification for Promotion stage
Qualification for Relegation stage

==== Results by match played ====
Team ╲ Round	1	2	3	4	5	6	7	8	9	10	11	12	13	14
Dandong Tengyue	D	D	L	D	D	W	L	W	L	L	L	L	L	W
Guangxi Pingguo Haliao	L	D	W	W	W	L	W	D	W	W	D	W	D	W
Hebei Kungfu	D	W	L	L	W	W	W	L	W	W	D	W	W	L
Hubei Istar	D	W	L	L	L	L	L	L	L	L	L	L	L	L
Inner Mongolia Caoshangfei	L	L	W	L	L	L	L	D	W	L	L	W	W	L
Shanxi Longjin	D	W	D	W	D	W	W	W	D	W	W	W	D	W
Shaoxing Keqiao Yuejia	W	L	W	W	L	L	L	D	D	W	W	L	L	D
Xi'an Wolves	W	L	D	D	W	W	W	D	L	L	W	L	W	D

W = Win; D = Draw; L = Loss

=== Group B ===
==== League table ====
Pos	Team	Pld	W	D	L	GF	GA	GD	Pts	Promotion, qualification or relegation
1	Qingdao Hainiu	14	9	4	1	25	5	+20	31	Qualification for Promotion stage
2	Dongguan United	14	7	4	3	18	10	+8	25	Qualification for Promotion stage
3	Yichun Grand Tiger	14	5	7	2	13	11	+2	22 (Note: Head-to-head results: Yichun Grand Tiger 0–0 Hebei Zhuoao, Hebei Zhuoao 1–2 Yichun Grand Tiger.)	Qualification for Relegation stage Group E
4	Hebei Zhuoao	14	5	7	2	17	9	+8	22	Qualification for Relegation stage Group F
5	China U-20	14	5	6	3	17	15	+2	21	Qualification for Relegation stage Group E
6	Wuxi Wugou	14	4	2	8	13	18	−5	14	Qualification for Relegation stage Group E
7	Shaanxi Warriors Beyond	14	2	4	8	7	18	−11	10	Qualification for Relegation stage Group E
8	Kunming Zheng He Shipman	14	0	4	10	10	34	−24	4	Qualification for Relegation stage Group F

Rules for classification:
- During season: 1) Points; 2) Goal difference; 3) Goals scored
- After season: 1) Points; 2) Head-to-head points; 3) Head-to-head goal difference; 4) Head-to-head goals scored; 5) Goal difference; 6) Goals scored; 7) Disciplinary points (1 point for each yellow card, 3 points for each red card); 8) Draw
  Notes:

==== Results ====
Home \ Away	CHN	DGU	HBZ	KZS	QDH	SWB	WXW	YGT
China U-20	—	2–1	0–0	1–1	0–2	2–1	0–0	2–2
Dongguan United	1–0	—	0–0	5–1	1–0	1–1	2–1	1–1
Hebei Zhuoao	2–2	1–0	—	3–2	1–1	0–0	0–1	1–2
Kunming Zheng He Shipman	2–3	1–2	0–4	—	0–2	1–1	1–3	0–0
Qingdao Hainiu	1–1	1–0	1–1	6–0	—	2–0	1–0	2–0
Shaanxi Warriors Beyond	0–1	0–2	0–1	1–0	0–3	—	0–0	0–1
Wuxi Wugou	1–3	1–2	0–3	2–0	0–2	3–1	—	0–1
Yichun Grand Tiger	1–0	0–0	0–0	1–1	1–1	1–2	2–1	—

Legend: Blue = home team win; Yellow = draw; Red = away team win.
For upcoming matches, an "a" indicates there is an article about the rivalry between the two participants.

==== Positions by round ====
To preserve chronological evolvements, any postponed matches are not included to the round at which they were originally scheduled, but added to the full round they were played immediately afterwards. For example, if a match is scheduled for round 7, but then played between rounds 8 and 9, it will be added to the standings for round 8.

Team ╲ Round	1	2	3	4	5	6	7	8	9	10	11	12	13	14
Qingdao Hainiu	7	4	4	3	1	1	1	1	1	1	1	1	1	1
Dongguan United	2	5	5	6	6	6	4	5	3	4	4	3	2	2
Yichun Grand Tiger	4	3	3	2	5	5	3	4	2	3	3	4	5	3
Hebei Zhuoao	6	6	6	5	3	4	5	2	4	2	2	2	3	4
China U-20	1	2	2	4	4	2	2	3	5	6	6	5	4	5
Wuxi Wugou	3	1	1	1	2	3	6	6	6	5	5	6	6	6
Shaanxi Warriors Beyond	8	7	7	7	7	7	7	7	7	7	7	7	7	7
Kunming Zheng He Shipman	5	8	8	8	8	8	8	8	8	8	8	8	8	8

Qualification for Promotion stage
Qualification for Relegation stage

==== Results by match played ====
Team ╲ Round	1	2	3	4	5	6	7	8	9	10	11	12	13	14
China U-20	W	W	D	L	D	W	D	D	L	L	D	W	W	D
Dongguan United	W	L	D	L	D	W	W	L	W	D	D	W	W	W
Hebei Zhuoao	L	D	D	W	W	D	D	W	L	W	D	W	D	D
Kunming Zheng He Shipman	L	L	L	L	L	D	L	D	L	L	D	L	D	L
Qingdao Hainiu	L	W	D	W	W	D	W	W	W	W	W	D	D	W
Shaanxi Warriors Beyond	L	L	D	W	D	L	L	W	D	L	D	L	L	L
Wuxi Wugou	W	W	W	L	D	L	L	L	D	W	L	L	L	L
Yichun Grand Tiger	W	D	D	W	L	D	W	L	W	D	D	D	D	W

W = Win; D = Draw; L = Loss

=== Group C ===
==== League table ====
Pos	Team	Pld	W	D	L	GF	GA	GD	Pts	Promotion, qualification or relegation
1	Shanghai Jiading Huilong	14	9	2	3	19	8	+11	29	Qualification for Promotion stage
2	Xiamen Egret Island	14	8	4	2	21	9	+12	28	Qualification for Promotion stage
3	Qingdao Youth Island	14	8	2	4	25	15	+10	26	Qualification for Promotion stage
4	Sichuan Minzu	14	6	4	4	17	11	+6	22	Qualification for Relegation stage Group E
5	Quanzhou Yassin	14	5	2	7	10	15	−5	17	Qualification for Relegation stage Group F
6	Qingdao Red Lions	14	4	3	7	12	17	−5	15 (Note: Head-to-head results: Qingdao Red Lions 0–0 Hunan Billows, Hunan Billows 0–1 Qingdao Red Lions.)	Qualification for Relegation stage Group E
7	Hunan Billows	14	4	3	7	8	19	−11	15	Qualification for Relegation stage Group F
8	Yanbian Longding	14	0	4	10	6	24	−18	4	Qualification for Relegation stage Group F

Rules for classification:
- During season: 1) Points; 2) Goal difference; 3) Goals scored
- After season: 1) Points; 2) Head-to-head points; 3) Head-to-head goal difference; 4) Head-to-head goals scored; 5) Goal difference; 6) Goals scored; 7) Disciplinary points (1 point for each yellow card, 3 points for each red card); 8) Draw
  Notes:

==== Results ====
Home \ Away	HNB	QRL	QYI	QZY	SJH	SCM	XEI	YBL
Hunan Billows	—	0–1	0–2	1–0	0–3	0–5	1–1	1–0
Qingdao Red Lions	0–0	—	0–2	1–3	1–0	1–2	0–3	2–0
Qingdao Youth Island	3–1	0–2	—	4–0	2–2	2–2	2–1	2–1
Quanzhou Yassin	0–1	2–1	0–2	—	0–1	1–0	0–2	2–0
Shanghai Jiading Huilong	0–0	2–1	1–0	0–1	—	1–0	0–1	2–0
Sichuan Minzu	2–1	2–1	2–1	1–0	0–1	—	1–1	0–0
Xiamen Egret Island	2–1	1–1	1–0	0–0	1–2	1–0	—	2–1
Yanbian Longding	0–1	0–0	2–3	1–1	1–4	0–0	0–4	—

Legend: Blue = home team win; Yellow = draw; Red = away team win.
For upcoming matches, an "a" indicates there is an article about the rivalry between the two participants.

==== Positions by round ====
To preserve chronological evolvements, any postponed matches are not included to the round at which they were originally scheduled, but added to the full round they were played immediately afterwards. For example, if a match is scheduled for round 7, but then played between rounds 8 and 9, it will be added to the standings for round 8.

Team ╲ Round	1	2	3	4	5	6	7	8	9	10	11	12	13	14
Shanghai Jiading Huilong	6	2	1	1	1	1	1	1	1	1	1	2	2	1
Xiamen Egret Island	7	5	6	4	4	5	6	5	4	4	3	3	3	2
Qingdao Youth Island	1	1	5	2	2	2	2	3	3	2	2	1	1	3
Sichuan Minzu	2	3	2	3	3	3	3	2	2	3	4	4	4	4
Quanzhou Yassin	5	7	7	7	7	7	7	7	7	7	5	5	5	5
Qingdao Red Lions	4	6	4	6	6	6	4	4	5	5	6	6	6	6
Hunan Billows	3	4	3	5	5	4	5	6	6	6	7	7	7	7
Yanbian Longding	8	8	8	8	8	8	8	8	8	8	8	8	8	8

Qualification for Promotion stage
Qualification for Relegation stage

==== Results by match played ====
Team ╲ Round	1	2	3	4	5	6	7	8	9	10	11	12	13	14
Hunan Billows	D	D	W	L	D	W	L	L	L	W	L	L	W	L
Qingdao Red Lions	D	L	W	L	D	D	W	W	L	L	L	W	L	L
Qingdao Youth Island	D	W	L	W	W	L	W	L	W	W	W	W	D	L
Quanzhou Yassin	D	L	L	W	L	L	W	L	L	W	W	W	L	D
Shanghai Jiading Huilong	D	W	W	W	W	W	L	W	W	L	W	L	D	W
Sichuan Minzu	D	W	W	L	D	D	W	W	W	L	L	L	D	W
Xiamen Egret Island	D	D	L	W	D	D	L	W	W	W	W	W	W	W
Yanbian Longding	D	L	L	L	L	D	L	L	L	L	L	L	D	D

W = Win; D = Draw; L = Loss

=== Ranking of third-placed teams ===
Pos	Grp	Team	Pld	W	D	L	GF	GA	GD	Pts	Qualification
1	C	Qingdao Youth Island	14	8	2	4	25	15	+10	26	Qualification for Promotion stage
2	A	Hebei Kungfu	14	8	2	4	18	10	+8	26	Qualification for Promotion stage
3	B	Yichun Grand Tiger	14	5	7	2	13	11	+2	22	Qualification for Relegation stage Group E

Rules for classification: 1) Points; 2) Goal difference; 3) Goals scored; 4) Disciplinary points (1 point for each yellow card, 3 points for each red card); 5) Draw

== Promotion stage ==
=== Group D ===
==== League table ====
Pos	Team	Pld	W	D	L	GF	GA	GD	Pts	Promotion, qualification or relegation
1	Qingdao Hainiu (C, P)	14	9	3	2	27	13	+14	30	Promotion to League One
2	Hebei Kungfu (P)	14	9	2	3	23	14	+9	29	Promotion to League One
3	Guangxi Pingguo Haliao (O, P)	14	7	5	2	29	14	+15	26	Qualification for Promotion play-offs
4	Qingdao Youth Island (O, P)	14	5	7	2	19	11	+8	22	Qualification for Promotion play-offs
5	Xiamen Egret Island (R, R)	14	4	4	6	11	20	−9	16	Dissolved after season
6	Shanxi Longjin (D)	14	3	4	7	14	21	−7	13	Dissolved after season
7	Shanghai Jiading Huilong (P)	14	1	7	6	9	19	−10	10	Promotion to League One
8	Dongguan United	14	1	2	11	11	31	−20	5	

Rules for classification:
- During season: 1) Points; 2) Goal difference; 3) Goals scored
- After season: 1) Points; 2) Head-to-head points; 3) Head-to-head goal difference; 4) Head-to-head goals scored; 5) Goal difference; 6) Goals scored; 7) Disciplinary points (1 point for each yellow card, 3 points for each red card); 8) Draw
  (C) Champions; (D) Disqualified; (O) Play-off winners; (P) Promoted; (R) Relegated

==== Results ====
Home \ Away	DGU	GPH	HBK	QDH	QYI	SJH	SXL	XEI
Dongguan United	—	1–3	2–3	0–3	1–3	0–0	1–2	0–2
Guangxi Pingguo Haliao	4–0	—	3–1	2–2	2–2	0–0	4–1	0–0
Hebei Kungfu	3–1	3–1	—	2–1	0–0	4–1	2–1	1–0
Qingdao Hainiu	1–0	1–1	1–2	—	3–2	1–0	1–0	5–1
Qingdao Youth Island	1–2	1–0	1–0	0–0	—	1–1	1–1	4–0
Shanghai Jiading Huilong	1–1	1–3	0–1	1–3	1–3	—	1–1	2–1
Shanxi Longjin	3–1	1–3	1–0	2–3	0–0	0–0	—	1–3
Xiamen Egret Island	2–1	0–3	1–1	0–2	0–0	0–0	1–0	—

Legend: Blue = home team win; Yellow = draw; Red = away team win.
For upcoming matches, an "a" indicates there is an article about the rivalry between the two participants.

==== Positions by round ====
To preserve chronological evolvements, any postponed matches are not included to the round at which they were originally scheduled, but added to the full round they were played immediately afterwards. For example, if a match is scheduled for round 7, but then played between rounds 8 and 9, it will be added to the standings for round 8.

Team ╲ Round	1	2	3	4	5	6	7	8	9	10	11	12	13	14
Qingdao Hainiu	2	3	1	1	1	1	1	1	1	1	1	1	1	1
Hebei Kungfu	4	6	3	3	3	3	2	3	2	3	2	2	2	2
Guangxi Pingguo Haliao	1	1	2	2	2	2	3	4	3	2	3	3	3	3
Qingdao Youth Island	5	5	6	6	5	4	4	2	4	4	4	4	4	4
Xiamen Egret Island	8	8	7	7	7	6	7	7	6	5	5	5	5	5
Shanxi Longjin	7	4	5	5	6	7	5	6	7	6	6	7	7	6
Shanghai Jiading Huilong	6	2	4	4	4	5	6	5	5	7	7	6	6	7
Dongguan United	3	7	8	8	8	8	8	8	8	8	8	8	8	8

Promotion to League One
Qualification for Promotion play-offs

==== Results by match played ====
Team ╲ Round	1	2	3	4	5	6	7	8	9	10	11	12	13	14
Dongguan United	D	L	L	L	L	L	L	D	L	L	L	L	W	L
Guangxi Pingguo Haliao	W	W	L	D	W	D	D	D	W	W	L	W	W	D
Hebei Kungfu	D	L	W	D	W	W	W	L	W	L	W	W	W	W
Qingdao Hainiu	W	D	W	W	W	L	D	W	W	W	W	W	L	D
Qingdao Youth Island	D	D	D	D	D	W	W	W	L	D	W	W	L	D
Shanghai Jiading Huilong	D	W	L	D	D	D	L	D	D	L	D	L	L	L
Shanxi Longjin	L	W	D	D	L	L	W	L	L	D	D	L	L	W
Xiamen Egret Island	L	L	W	D	L	W	L	D	D	W	L	L	W	D

W = Win; D = Draw; L = Loss

=== Promotion play-offs ===
Both Qingdao Youth Island and Guangxi Pingguo Haliao won their respective playoff matches against China League One opponents, and were promoted.

== Relegation stage ==
=== Group E ===
==== League table ====
Pos	Team	Pld	W	D	L	GF	GA	GD	Pts	Promotion, qualification or relegation
1	Wuxi Wugou	7	5	2	0	13	3	+10	17	
2	China U-20	7	3	2	2	11	5	+6	11 (Note: China U-20 finished ahead of Hubei Istar on head-to-head points: Hubei Istar 1–2 China U-20.)	
3	Hubei Istar	7	3	2	2	10	6	+4	11	
4	Yichun Grand Tiger	7	2	3	2	6	6	0	9 (Note: Yichun Grand Tiger finished ahead of Sichuan Minzu on goal difference: Yichun Grand Tiger 0–0 Sichuan Minzu; Goal difference: Yichun Grand Tiger 0 and Sichuan Minzu -1.)	
5	Sichuan Minzu (R, R, R)	7	2	3	2	6	7	−1	9	Dissolved after season
6	Dandong Tengyue	7	2	2	3	4	10	−6	8	
7	Qingdao Red Lions (O)	7	1	4	2	3	4	−1	7	Qualification for relegation play-offs
8	Shaanxi Warriors Beyond (R)	7	1	0	6	3	15	−12	3	Relegation to CMCL

Rules for classification:
- During season: 1) Points; 2) Goal difference; 3) Goals scored
- After season: 1) Points; 2) Head-to-head points; 3) Head-to-head goal difference; 4) Head-to-head goals scored; 5) Goal difference; 6) Goals scored; 7) Disciplinary points (1 point for each yellow card, 3 points for each red card); 8) Draw
  (O) Play-off winners; (R) Relegated
  Notes:

==== Results ====
Home \ Away	CHN	DDT	HBI	QRL	SWB	SCM	WXW	YGT
China U-20				1–1			0–1	1–1
Dandong Tengyue	0–4				2–0	0–0		1–1
Hubei Istar	1–2	1–0					1–1	
Qingdao Red Lions		0–1	0–0				0–0	0–1
Shaanxi Warriors Beyond	1–0		1–5	0–1			0–3	
Sichuan Minzu	0–3		1–0	1–1	3–1			
Wuxi Wugou		4–0				2–1		2–1
Yichun Grand Tiger			1–2		1–0	0–0		

Legend: Blue = home team win; Yellow = draw; Red = away team win.
For upcoming matches, an "a" indicates there is an article about the rivalry between the two participants.

==== Positions by round ====
To preserve chronological evolvements, any postponed matches are not included to the round at which they were originally scheduled, but added to the full round they were played immediately afterwards. For example, if a match is scheduled for round 7, but then played between rounds 8 and 9, it will be added to the standings for round 8.

Team ╲ Round	1	2	3	4	5	6	7
Wuxi Wugou	3	1	1	1	1	1	1
China U-20	5	4	2	2	3	3	2
Hubei Istar	6	7	7	4	4	4	3
Yichun Grand Tiger	4	3	4	5	6	7	4
Sichuan Minzu	2	5	3	3	2	2	5
Dandong Tengyue	1	2	6	7	7	5	6
Qingdao Red Lions	7	6	5	6	5	6	7
Shaanxi Warriors Beyond	8	8	8	8	8	8	8

Qualification for relegation play-offs
Relegation to CMCL

==== Results by match played ====
Team ╲ Round	1	2	3	4	5	6	7
China U-20	L	W	W	D	L	D	W
Dandong Tengyue	W	D	L	L	D	W	L
Hubei Istar	L	L	W	W	D	D	W
Qingdao Red Lions	L	W	D	D	D	D	L
Shaanxi Warriors Beyond	L	L	L	L	W	L	L
Sichuan Minzu	W	L	W	D	D	D	L
Wuxi Wugou	W	W	D	W	W	D	W
Yichun Grand Tiger	W	D	L	D	L	D	W

W = Win; D = Draw; L = Loss

=== Group F ===
==== League table ====
Pos	Team	Pld	W	D	L	GF	GA	GD	Pts	Promotion, qualification or relegation
1	Hebei Zhuoao (D, R)	7	4	2	1	9	2	+7	14	Dissolved after season
2	Yanbian Longding	7	2	5	0	9	5	+4	11	
3	Xi'an Wolves (R, D)	7	2	4	1	9	8	+1	10	Dissolved after season
4	Hunan Billows	7	2	3	2	6	5	+1	9 (Note: Hunan Billows finished ahead of Kunming Zheng He Shipman on head-to-head points: Kunming Zheng He Shipman 0–2 Hunan Billows.)	
5	Kunming Zheng He Shipman (D, R)	7	2	3	2	8	10	−2	9	Dissolved after season
6	Inner Mongolia Caoshangfei	7	1	5	1	7	8	−1	8	
7	Shaoxing Keqiao Yuejia (D)	7	1	2	4	4	10	−6	5	Dissolved after season
8	Quanzhou Yassin (T)	7	0	4	3	3	7	−4	4	Relegation to CMCL and a repêchage.

Rules for classification:
- During season: 1) Points; 2) Goal difference; 3) Goals scored
- After season: 1) Points; 2) Head-to-head points; 3) Head-to-head goal difference; 4) Head-to-head goals scored; 5) Goal difference; 6) Goals scored; 7) Disciplinary points (1 point for each yellow card, 3 points for each red card); 8) Draw
  (D) Disqualified; (R) Relegated; (T) Qualified, but not yet for the particular phase indicated
  Notes:

==== Results ====
Home \ Away	HBZ	HNB	IMC	KZS	QZY	SKY	XAW	YBL
Hebei Zhuoao		0–0			2–0	2–1		
Hunan Billows			1–2		1–0	1–1	0–0	
Inner Mongolia Caoshangfei	0–2			2–2	1–1	0–0		
Kunming Zheng He Shipman	0–3	0–2					4–2	1–1
Quanzhou Yassin				0–0			1–1	1–1
Shaoxing Keqiao Yuejia				0–1	1–0			0–3
Xi'an Wolves	1–0		1–1			3–1		
Yanbian Longding	0–0	2–1	1–1				1–1	

Legend: Blue = home team win; Yellow = draw; Red = away team win.
For upcoming matches, an "a" indicates there is an article about the rivalry between the two participants.

==== Positions by round ====
To preserve chronological evolvements, any postponed matches are not included to the round at which they were originally scheduled, but added to the full round they were played immediately afterwards. For example, if a match is scheduled for round 7, but then played between rounds 8 and 9, it will be added to the standings for round 8.

Team ╲ Round	1	2	3	4	5	6	7
Hebei Zhuoao	6	6	2	1	1	1	1
Yanbian Longding	7	1	1	3	3	2	2
Xi'an Wolves	8	7	7	4	5	4	3
Hunan Billows	2	4	3	2	2	3	4
Kunming Zheng He Shipman	1	2	4	6	4	5	5
Inner Mongolia Caoshangfei	3	3	5	5	6	6	6
Shaoxing Keqiao Yuejia	5	8	8	8	8	7	7
Quanzhou Yassin	4	5	6	7	7	8	8

Qualification for relegation play-offs
Relegation to CMCL

==== Results by match played ====
Team ╲ Round	1	2	3	4	5	6	7
Hebei Zhuoao	D	D	W	W	W	L	W
Hunan Billows	D	D	W	W	D	L	L
Inner Mongolia Caoshangfei	D	D	D	D	L	D	W
Kunming Zheng He Shipman	W	D	L	L	W	D	D
Quanzhou Yassin	D	D	L	L	D	L	D
Shaoxing Keqiao Yuejia	D	L	D	L	L	W	L
Xi'an Wolves	L	D	D	W	D	W	D
Yanbian Longding	D	W	D	D	D	W	D

W = Win; D = Draw; L = Loss

== Relegation play-offs ==
=== Overview ===
Team 1	Agg.	Team 2	1st leg	2nd leg
Zibo Qisheng	2–4	Qingdao Red Lions	1–2	1–2
Shaoxing Keqiao Yuejia	1–3	Hubei Huachuang	1–2	0–1

=== Matches ===
8 December 2021
14:00 UTC+8

Zibo Qisheng	1–2	Qingdao Red Lions
Li Xingcan 43'	Report	Song Hua 27'; Lu Yi 36'

Yancheng Yufeng Football Training Base Field 1, Yancheng
Attendance: 0 (Note: The match was played behind closed doors due to the COVID-19 pandemic.)
Referee: Wan Tao
12 December 2021
14:00 UTC+8

Qingdao Red Lions	2–1	Zibo Qisheng
Lian Chen 45', 48'	Report	Xu Meng 80'

Yancheng Yufeng Football Training Base Field 1, Yancheng
Attendance: 0
Referee: Cui Yueqiang

Qingdao Red Lions won 4–2 on aggregate.

8 December 2021
14:00 UTC+8

Shaoxing Keqiao Yuejia	1–2	Hubei Huachuang
Azimatjan Alim 47'	Report	Liu Feng 21', 39'

Yancheng Yufeng Football Training Base Field 3, Yancheng
Attendance: 0
Referee: Wang Jing
12 December 2021
14:00 UTC+8

Hubei Huachuang	1–0	Shaoxing Keqiao Yuejia
Zhang Yang 86' (pen.)	Report

Yancheng Yufeng Football Training Base Field 3, Yancheng
Attendance: 0
Referee: He Xin

Hubei Huachuang won 3–1 on aggregate.

== Statistics ==
=== Top scorers ===
As of 30 December 2021

Rank	Player	Club	Goals
1	(China) Li Kai	Qingdao Youth Island	14
2	(China) Wang Ziming	Guangxi Pingguo Haliao	13
3	(China) Han Jiabao	Shanxi Longjin	10
3	(China) Tan Tiancheng	Xi'an Wolves	10
5	(China) Guo Song	Guangxi Pingguo Haliao	9
5	(China) Li Biao	Kunming Zheng He Shipman	9
7	(China) Sun Yue	Shanghai Jiading Huilong	8
7	(China) Geng Taili	Guangxi Pingguo Haliao	8
7	(China) Chen Jiaqi	Qingdao Hainiu	8
7	(China) Xie Wenneng	China U-20 and Qingdao Hainiu	8
7	(China) Zhang Hao	Hebei Kungfu	8
7	(China) Aizmatijan Alim	Shaoxing Keqiao Yuejia	8
7	(China) Lian Chen	Qingdao Red Lions	8

=== Hat-tricks ===
Player	For	Against	Result	Date
(China) Geng Taili	Guangxi Pingguo Haliao	Dandong Tengyue	5–1 (A)	2 July 2021
(China) Yan Hao	Inner Mongolia Caoshangfei	Hubei Istar	3–0 (H)	3 July 2021
(China) Lin Zefeng	Shanxi Longjin	Dandong Tengyue	4–0 (H)	17 July 2021
(China) Li Biao	Kunming Zheng He Shipman	Xi'an Wolves	4–2 (H)	4 November 2021
