= Chen Yongbin =

Chinese association football player

Personal information
- Date of birth: 21 January 1999 (age 27)
- Place of birth: Qingdao, Shandong, China
- Height: 1.80 m (5 ft 11 in)
- Position: Midfielder

Team information
- Current team: Qingdao Red Lions

Youth career
- 2018–2020: Qingdao Red Lions
- 2019–2020: → Adelaide United (loan)

Senior career*
Years	Team	Apps	(Gls)
2020–	Qingdao Red Lions	1	(0)
- * Club domestic league appearances and goals as of 17:14, 22 September 2023 (UTC)

Chen Yongbin (simplified Chinese: 陈勇傧; traditional Chinese: 陳勇傧; pinyin: Chén Yǒngbīn; born 21 January 1999) is a Chinese footballer currently playing as a midfielder for Qingdao Red Lions.

== Club career ==
Having played amateur football in Dezhou and Qingdao, including playing five-a-side football, Chen joined professional side Qingdao Red Lions in 2018. In October of the following year, he joined Australian side Adelaide United on loan, being assigned to their youth team. The move came under scrutiny from Australian media, who accused Adelaide United of tokenism, as they did not believe Chen was good enough to ever play for the side, as he had never played professionally before.

Chen's move to Australia was delayed, and he only arrived in early December 2019, nearly fifty days after the signing had been announced. He made his debut for Adelaide's youth team as a substitute in the Y-League later in the same month, but only managed a further two substitute appearances, for a total of thirty-six minutes. He spent more time as a makeshift linesman than he did playing during his time in Australia.

He returned to China and the Qingdao Red Lions in October 2020, and went on to make his debut in the China League Two the following month, coming on as a second-half substitute for Deng Yu'nong in a 2–1 loss to Nanjing City on 15 November.

== Career statistics ==
=== Club ===
As of 22 September 2023.

Appearances and goals by club, season and competition
Club	Season	League			Cup		Other		Total	
Club	Season	Division	Apps	Goals	Apps	Goals	Apps	Goals	Apps	Goals
Qingdao Red Lions	2020	China League Two	1	0	0	0	0	0	1	0
Qingdao Red Lions	2021	China League Two	0	0	1 (Note: Appearances in the Chinese FA Cup)	0	0	0	1	0
Qingdao Red Lions	2022	China League Two	0	0	0	0	0	0	0	0
Qingdao Red Lions	2023	China League Two	0	0	0	0	0	0	0	0
Career total			1	0	0	0	0	0	1	0
