= Wu Dingmao =

Chinese footballer

Wu Dingmao 吴丁卯
Personal information
- Date of birth: 13 April 1987 (age 39)
- Place of birth: Dalian, Liaoning, China
- Height: 1.80 m (5 ft 11 in)
- Positions: Forward; midfielder

Team information
- Current team: Jiangsu Landhouse Dong Victory
- Number: 14

Senior career*
Years	Team	Apps	(Gls)
2009–2010	Panjin Mengzun	?	(?)
2011–2013	Harbin Yiteng	6	(1)
2012	→ Shanxi Jiayi (loan)	23	(11)
2013	→ Hebei Zhongji (loan)	15	(6)
2014–2016	Guizhou Renhe	0	(0)
2016	→ Shenyang Urban (loan)	8	(2)
2017–2018	Shenyang Urban	29	(8)
2019–2020	Xi'an UKD	9	(3)
2021–2022	Haimen Codion	1+	(4+)
2023	Zhuhai 2030		
2023	Dalian Huayi		
2024–	Jiangsu Landhouse Dong Victory		
- * Club domestic league appearances and goals as of 1 June 2024

Wu Dingmao (Chinese: 吴丁卯; born 13 April 1987) is a Chinese footballer who plays as a forward for Chinese Champions League club Jiangsu Landhouse Dong Victory.

== Club career ==
In 2009, Wu Dingmao started his professional football career with Panjin Mengzun in the China League Two. In 2011, Wu transferred to China League Two side Harbin Yiteng. In the 2011 China League Two campaign he would be part of the team that won the division and promotion into the second tier.

In 2012, He moved to China League Two side Shanxi Jiayi on a one-year loan deal. In 2013, He moved to China League Two side Hebei Zhongji on a one-year loan deal.

In 2014, Wu transferred to Chinese Super League side Guizhou Renhe. On 22 April 2014, he made his debut for Guizhou Renhe in the 2014 AFC Champions League against Western Sydney Wanderers, coming on as a substitute for Shen Tianfeng in the 76th minute. In June 2016, Wu was loaned to China League Two side Shenyang Urban until 31 December 2016.

== Career statistics ==
Statistics accurate as of match played 31 December 2020.

Appearances and goals by club, season and competition
Club	Season	League			National Cup		Continental		Other		Total	
Club	Season	Division	Apps	Goals	Apps	Goals	Apps	Goals	Apps	Goals	Apps	Goals
Panjin Mengzun	2009	China League Two			-		-		-			
Panjin Mengzun	2010	China League Two			-		-		-			
Panjin Mengzun	Total				0	0	0	0	0	0		
Harbin Yiteng	2011	China League Two	6	1	0	0	-		-		6	1
Shanxi Jiayi (loan)	2012	China League Two	23	11	1	0	-		-		24	11
Hebei Zhongji (loan)	2013	China League Two	15	6	2	0	-		-		17	6
Guizhou Renhe	2014	Chinese Super League	0	0	0	0	1	0	-		1	0
Guizhou Renhe	2015	Chinese Super League	0	0	1	0	-		-		1	0
Guizhou Renhe	Total		0	0	1	0	1	0	0	0	2	0
Shenyang Urban (loan)	2016	China League Two	8	2	0	0	-		-		8	2
Shenyang Urban	2017	China League Two	17	5	1	1	-		-		18	6
Shenyang Urban	2018	China League Two	12	3	2	1	-		-		14	4
Shenyang Urban	Total		29	8	3	2	0	0	0	0	32	10
Xi'an UKD	2019	CMCL	-		-		-		-		0	0
Xi'an UKD	2020	China League Two	9	3	-		-		-		9	3
Xi'an UKD	Total		9	3	0	0	0	0	0	0	9	3
Career total			90	31	7	2	1	0	0	0	98	33

== Honours ==
=== Club ===
Harbin Yiteng

- China League Two: 2011
