= Tang Qirun =

Chinese association football player

Personal information
- Date of birth: 11 March 2000 (age 26)
- Height: 1.80 m (5 ft 11 in)
- Position: Midfielder

Team information
- Current team: Wuxi Wugo
- Number: 6

Youth career
- –2019: Shandong Taishan

Senior career*
Years	Team	Apps	(Gls)
2019–2020	Shandong Taishan	0	(0)
2019	→ Kunming Zheng He Shipman (loan)	17	(0)
2020	Shenzhen Bogang	8	(1)
2021–2022	Jiangxi Beidamen	54	(5)
2023–	Wuxi Wugo	31	(2)
- * Club domestic league appearances and goals as of 14:01, 21 July 2024 (UTC)

Tang Qirun (Chinese: 唐启润; born 11 March 2000) is a Chinese footballer currently playing as a midfielder for Wuxi Wugo.

== Career statistics ==
=== Club ===
As of 21 July 2024.

Club	Season	League			Cup		Continental		Other		Total	
Club	Season	Division	Apps	Goals	Apps	Goals	Apps	Goals	Apps	Goals	Apps	Goals
Shandong Taishan	2019	Chinese Super League	0	0	0	0	0 (Note: Appearances in the AFC Champions League)	0	–		0	0
Shandong Taishan	2020	Chinese Super League	0	0	0	0	–		–		0	0
Shandong Taishan	Total		0	0	0	0	0	0	0	0	0	0
Kunming Zheng He Shipman (loan)	2019	China League Two	17	0	1	0	–		–		18	0
Shenzhen Bogang	2020	China League Two	8	1	–		–		–		8	1
Jiangxi Beidamen	2021	China League One	30	3	1	0	–		–		31	3
Jiangxi Beidamen	2022	China League One	24	2	2	0	–		–		26	2
Jiangxi Beidamen	Total		54	5	3	0	0	0	0	0	57	5
Wuxi Wugo	2023	China League One	16	1	1	0	–		–		17	1
Wuxi Wugo	2024	China League One	15	1	3	0	–		–		18	1
Wuxi Wugo	Total		31	2	4	0	0	0	0	0	35	2
Career total			110	8	8	0	0	0	0	0	118	8
