= Geng Taili =

Chinese footballer (born 2000)

Personal information
- Date of birth: 7 January 2000 (age 26)
- Place of birth: Zhaotong, Yunnan, China
- Height: 1.80 m (5 ft 11 in)
- Position: Forward

Team information
- Current team: Changchun Yatai
- Number: 19

Youth career
- Kunming FA
- 2013–2018: Atlético Madrid
- 2019–2020: Guangzhou City

Senior career*
Years	Team	Apps	(Gls)
2020–2023	Guangxi Pingguo Haliao	47	(9)
2023	→ Jiangxi Dark Horse Junior(loan)	12	(0)
2023–2025	Wenzhou FC	48	(10)
2025	Ganzhou Ruishi	10	(1)
2026–	Changchun Yatai	0	(0)

International career
2015	China U16		
- * Club domestic league appearances and goals as of 17:14, 30 January 2023 (UTC)

Geng Taili (Chinese: 耿泰立; born 7 January 2000) is a Chinese footballer who plays as a forward for Changchun Yatai.

== Club career ==
Born in Zhaotong, Yunnan, Geng started his career with the Kunming Football Association team, before being selected in 2013 for the Wanda Group "China's Future Football Star" initiative, to encourage the development of young Chinese players. He spent five years with Atlético Madrid, before a return to China, joining Guangzhou City in February 2019.

He joined Guangxi Pingguo Haliao in August 2020, going on to establish himself as a good finisher with the club.

== International career ==
Geng was called up to the Chinese under-16 team in 2015.

== Career statistics ==
=== Club ===
As of 30 January 2023.

Appearances and goals by club, season and competition
Club	Season	League			Cup		Other		Total	
Club	Season	Division	Apps	Goals	Apps	Goals	Apps	Goals	Apps	Goals
Guangxi Pingguo Haliao	2020	China League Two	3	0	0	0	0	0	3	0
Guangxi Pingguo Haliao	2021	China League Two	25	8	0	0	2 (Note: Appearances in the Promotion Playoffs)	0	27	8
Guangxi Pingguo Haliao	2022	China League One	19	1	2 (Note: Appearances in the Chinese FA Cup)	0	0	0	21	1
Career total			47	9	2	0	2	0	51	9
