= Li Kai =

Chinese footballer

Li Kai 李凯
Personal information
- Full name: Li Kai
- Date of birth: July 25, 1989 (age 37)
- Place of birth: Qingdao, Shandong, China
- Height: 1.85 m (6 ft 1 in)
- Positions: Forward; left winger; defender

Senior career*
Years	Team	Apps	(Gls)
2008–2010	Dalian Shide	40	(5)
2010	→ Shaanxi Baorong Chanba (loan)	26	(2)
2011–2013	Guizhou Renhe	34	(1)
2013	→ Qingdao Hainiu (loan)	11	(6)
2014–2015	Qingdao Hainiu	30	(3)
2016	Shijiazhuang Ever Bright	10	(0)
2017	Jiangxi Liansheng	21	(5)
2018	Qingdao Jonoon	21	(4)
2019	Heze Caozhou	–	(–)
2020–2024	Qingdao West Coast	61	(25)
2024	→ Qingdao Red Lions (loan)	12	(1)

International career
2009–2011	China U23		
- * Club domestic league appearances and goals as of 31 December 2020

Li Kai (simplified Chinese: 李凯; traditional Chinese: 李凱; pinyin: Li Kǎi; Born July 25, 1989) is a Chinese professional footballer.

== Club career ==
Li Kai began his professional football career after graduating from the Dalian Shide youth team in 2008 and would make his senior debut for the club on June 25, 2008 in a league game over Liaoning Whowin where Dalian won 2-1. In his debut season Li Kai would go on to score his first goal for the club on September 12, 2008 in a 3-1 defeat to Shanghai Shenhua. However, the team suffered a disappointing season which saw Dalian flirt with relegation.

By the beginning of the 2010 league season Dalian allowed Li Kai to go on loan to top tier side Shaanxi Baorong Chanba and he would make his debut for the club on March 28, 2010 in a 1-1 draw against his parent club Dalian Shide. By July 28, 2010 he would then score his first goal for the club in a league game against Chongqing Lifan, which ended in a 2-2 draw. His loan period made his move permanent the following season before his new club decided to move to Guizhou and renamed themselves Guizhou Renhe in 2012.

On 2 January 2016, Kai transferred to Chinese Super League side Shijiazhuang Ever Bright. He made his debut for Shijiazhuang on 1 May 2016 in a 2–0 defeat against Tianjin Teda, coming on for Mi Haolun in the 81st minute.

In March 2017, Kai transferred to League Two side Jiangxi Liansheng. On 7 March 2018, Kai transferred to Qingdao Jonoon.

== Career statistics ==
Statistics accurate as of match played 31 December 2020.

Appearances and goals by club, season and competition
Club	Season	League			National Cup		Continental		Other		Total	
Club	Season	Division	Apps	Goals	Apps	Goals	Apps	Goals	Apps	Goals	Apps	Goals
Dalian Shide	2008	Chinese Super League	20	2	-		-		-		20	2
Dalian Shide	2009	Chinese Super League	20	3	-		-		-		20	3
Dalian Shide	Total		40	5	0	0	0	0	0	0	40	5
Shaanxi Baorong Chanba (loan)	2010	Chinese Super League	26	2	-		-		-		26	2
Shaanxi Baorong Chanba/ Guizhou Renhe	2011	Chinese Super League	18	1	2	0	-		-		20	1
Shaanxi Baorong Chanba/ Guizhou Renhe	2012	Chinese Super League	14	0	5	0	-		-		19	0
Shaanxi Baorong Chanba/ Guizhou Renhe	2013	Chinese Super League	2	0	0	0	3	1	-		5	1
Shaanxi Baorong Chanba/ Guizhou Renhe	Total		34	1	7	0	3	1	0	0	44	2
Qingdao Hainiu (loan)	2013	China League Two	11	6	-		-		-		11	6
Qingdao Hainiu	2014	China League One	15	3	4	0	-		-		19	3
Qingdao Hainiu	2015	China League One	15	0	0	0	-		-		15	0
Qingdao Hainiu	Total		30	3	4	0	0	0	0	0	34	3
Shijiazhuang Ever Bright	2016	Chinese Super League	10	0	2	0	-		-		12	0
Jiangxi Liansheng	2017	China League Two	21	5	2	0	-		-		23	5
Qingdao Jonoon	2018	China League Two	21	4	0	0	-		-		21	4
Heze Caozhou	2019	CMCL	-		-		-		-		-	
Qingdao Zhongchuang Hengtai	2020	China League Two	9	4	-		-		-		9	4
Career total			202	30	15	0	3	1	0	0	220	31

== Honours ==
=== Club ===
Qingdao Hainiu

- China League Two: 2013
