= Yang Wenjie =

Chinese footballer

Personal information
- Date of birth: 30 December 1988 (age 37)
- Place of birth: China
- Position: Forward

Team information
- Current team: Tianjin Fusheng

Senior career*
Years	Team	Apps	(Gls)
- Tianjin Dongli
- Bangkok FC
2014	FK Lokomotiva Brčko		
2015	Borac (Banja Luka)	0	(0)
2016–2017	Shaanxi Chang'an Athletic	22	(1)
2018	Shanxi Longjin	0	(0)
2019–2021	Shaanxi Warriors Beyond	29	(2)
2022-	Tianjin Fusheng	0	(0)
- * Club domestic league appearances and goals as of 29 April 2022

Yang Wenjie (Chinese: 杨文杰; born 30 December 1988) is a Chinese footballer who plays as a forward for Chinese club Tianjin Fusheng.

== Career ==
Yang started his career with Chinese side Tianjin Dongli. After that, he signed for Bangkok FC in the Thai second division. Before the second half of 2013–14, Yang signed for Bosnia and Herzegovina third division club FK Lokomotiva Brčko. Before the second half of 2014–15, he signed for Borac (Banja Luka) in the Bosnia and Herzegovina top flight. Before the 2016 season, he signed for Chinese third division team Shaanxi Chang'an Athletic after trialing for Mechelen in Belgium and Chinese top flight outfit Tianjin TEDA.
