= Dongli =

Dongli may refer to:

- Dongli District (东丽区), Tianjin, China
- Tianjin Dongli (天津东丽), Chinese football club
- Ma Zhiyuan (c. 1250–1321), courtesy name Dongli (東籬), Chinese poet

Towns

- Dongli, Leizhou, in Leizhou City, Guangdong
- Dongli, Shantou, in Chenghai District, Shantou, Guangdong
- Dongli, Yiyuan County, in Yiyuan County, Shandong
