= 2020 China League Two =

2020 season of third division Chinese association football

China League Two
- Season: 2020
- Dates: 24 October – 12 December 2020
- Champions: Wuhan Three Towns
- Promoted: Wuhan Three Towns; Zibo Cuju; Nanjing City; Beijing BIT
- Matches: 108
- Goals: 222 (2.06 per match)
- Top goalscorer: Yu Zengpin (7 goals)
- Biggest home win: Wuhan Three Towns 4–0 Shanxi Longjin (11 November 2020)
- Biggest away win: Jiangsu Yancheng Dingli 0–4 Beijing BIT (11 November 2020); Hunan Billows 0–4 Hubei Chufeng United (30 November 2020)
- Highest scoring: Inner Mongolia Caoshangfei 3–3 Qingdao Jonoon (11 November 2020)
- Longest winning run: 6 matches Nanjing Fengfan; Zibo Cuju
- Longest unbeaten run: 9 matches Nanjing Fengfan
- Longest winless run: 12 matches Shanxi Longjin
- Longest losing run: 12 matches Shanxi Longjin

The 2020 Chinese Football Association Division Two League season was the 31st season since its establishment in 1989. The season was scheduled to begin on 14 March and end on 17 October 2020, but was postponed following the coronavirus pandemic in China. On 12 October 2020, Chinese Football Association announced that the season would be resumed on 24 October 2020. In this season, 21 teams were split into two groups.

== Team changes ==
=== To League Two ===
Teams promoted from 2019 Chinese Champions League

- Nanjing Fengfan
- Shenzhen Bogang
- Xi'an UKD
- Shanghai Jiading Boji
- Qingdao Zhongchuang Hengtai

=== From League Two ===
Teams promoted to 2020 China League One

- Shenyang Urban
- Chengdu Better City
- Taizhou Yuanda
- Suzhou Dongwu
- Jiangxi Liansheng
- Sichuan Jiuniu
- Kunshan F.C.

Disqualified or dissolved entries

- ~~Baoding Yingli ETS~~
- ~~Dalian Chanjoy~~
- ~~Fujian Tianxin~~
- ~~Hangzhou Wuyue Qiantang~~
- ~~Jilin Baijia~~
- ~~Lhasa Urban Construction Investment~~
- ~~Nanjing Shaye~~
- ~~Shenzhen Pengcheng~~
- ~~Yanbian Beiguo~~
- ~~Yinchuan Helanshan~~

Heze Caozhou and Nanjing Balanta gained entries to 2020 China League Two but both withdrew before the season starts.

=== Name changes ===
- Shanxi Metropolis F.C. changed their name to Shanxi Longjin in March 2020.

== Clubs ==
=== Stadiums and Locations ===
Team	Head coach	City	Stadium	Capacity	2019 season
Hebei Aoli Jingying	(China) Zhang Xu	Qinhuangdao	Qinhuangdao Olympic Sports Centre Stadium	33,572	5th
Zibo Cuju	(China) Hou Zhiqiang	Zibo	Zibo Sports Center Stadium	45,000	7th
Wuhan Three Towns	(Spain) Albert Garcia Xicota	Wuhan	Hankou Cultural Sports Centre	20,000	11th
Qingdao Jonoon	(Serbia) Dragoslav Milenković (caretaker)	Qingdao	Qingdao Tiantai Stadium	20,525	14th
Jiangsu Yancheng Dingli	(China) Zhang Zhiyue (caretaker)	Yancheng	Dafeng Olympic Sports Centre	10,000	15th
Zhejiang Yiteng	(China) Liu Hongyi	Shaoxing	China Textile City Sports Center	40,000	16th
Hubei Chufeng United	(Brazil) Luíz Felipe	Wuhan	Xiaogan Sports Centre Stadium	27,000	19th
Beijing BIT	(China) Yu Fei	Beijing	BIT Eastern Athletic Field	5,000	20th
Qingdao Red Lions	(Spain) Javier Muñoz Sanchez	Laixi	Laixi Sports Center Stadium	15,000	24th
Guangxi Baoyun	(China) Han Zhenyuan	Liuzhou	Liuzhou Sports Center	35,000	27th
Hunan Billows	(China) Wang Chen	Changsha	Yiyang Olympic Sports Park Stadium	30,000	28th
Inner Mongolia Caoshangfei	(Serbia) Zoran Maricic	Baotou	Baotou Olympic Sports Centre Stadium	40,545	29th (Relegation play-offs winner)
Xi'an Daxing Chongde	(China) Jiang Nan (caretaker)	Xi'an	Northwestern Polytechnical University (Chang'an Campus) Stadium	N/A	30th
Nanjing Fengfan ^{P}	(China) Tang Bo	Nanjing			CMCL, 1st
Shenzhen Bogang ^{P}	(China) Zhang Bing	Shenzhen			CMCL, 2nd
Xi'an UKD ^{P}	(China) Huang Hongyi	Xi'an			CMCL, 4th
Shanghai Jiading Boji ^{P}	(China) Wang Hongliang	Shanghai	Jiading Stadium	9,704	CMCL, 5th (Relegation play-offs winner)
Yunnan Kunlu	(China) Shi Jun (caretaker)	Kunming	Qujing Cultural Sports Park Stadium	34,162	31st
Shanxi Longjin	(China) Wang Qing (caretaker)	Taiyuan	Shanxi Sports Centre Stadium	62,000	32nd
Qingdao Zhongchuang Hengtai ^{P}	(China) Zhou Xin	Qingdao			CMCL, 8th
China U19	(China) Cheng Yaodong				

=== Clubs Locations ===
Location of teams in 2020 China League Two

=== Managerial changes ===
Team	Outgoing manager	Manner of departure	Date of vacancy	Incoming manager	Date of appointment
Guangxi Baoyun	(China) Yang Lin	Signed by Xiamen Qudian	19 December 2019	(China) Zhang Enhua	19 December 2019
Qingdao Jonoon	(Serbia) Dragoslav Milenković	End of tenure as a caretaker	23 December 2019	(China) Zhu Jiong	23 December 2019
Shenzhen Bogang	(China) Li Haiqiang	Mutual consent	23 April 2020	(China) Zhang Bing	23 April 2020
Xi'an Daxing Chongde	(Serbia) Bojan Pavlović	Signed by Shanxi Longjin	13 May 2020	(China) Liu Zhaojie	13 May 2020
Shanxi Longjin	(Chinese Taipei) Vom Ca-nhum	Signed by Chinese Taipei national football team	13 May 2020	(Serbia) Bojan Pavlović	13 May 2020
Hunan Billows	(China) Tang Jing	Signed by Jiangsu Yancheng Dingli	2 June 2020	(China) Wang Chen	2 June 2020
Jiangsu Yancheng Dingli	(China) Huang Yong	Signed by Liuzhou Ranko	2 June 2020	(China) Tang Jing	2 June 2020
Yunnan Kunlu	(China) He Yunqun	End of tenure as a caretaker	9 June 2020	(China) Zhang Biao	9 June 2020
Hebei Aoli Jingying	(Brazil) Vila	Mutual consent	9 July 2020	(China) Zhang Xu	9 July 2020
Xi'an Daxing Chongde	(China) Liu Zhaojie	Resigned	16 July 2020	(China) Jiang Nan	16 July 2020
Guangxi Baoyun	(China) Zhang Enhua	Resigned	7 August 2020	(China) Zhao Changhong	7 August 2020
Qingdao Jonoon	(China) Zhu Jiong	Sacked	3 November 2020	(Serbia) Dragoslav Milenković	3 November 2020
Guangxi Baoyun	(China) Zhao Changhong	Sacked	18 November 2020	(China) Han Zhenyuan	18 November 2020
Nanjing Fengfan	(China) Yin Youyou	Mutual consent	October/November 2020	(China) Tang Bo	October/November 2020

== Group A ==
=== League table ===
Pos	Team	Pld	W	D	L	GF	GA	GD	Pts	Qualification or relegation
1	Nanjing Fengfan (P)	9	8	1	0	16	4	+12	25	Qualification to promotion play-offs
2	Beijing BIT (P)	9	5	3	1	15	6	+9	18	Qualification to promotion play-offs
3	Qingdao Jonoon	9	4	4	1	14	7	+7	16	
4	Qingdao Zhongchuang Hengtai	9	4	2	3	11	9	+2	14	
5	Shenzhen Bogang (D)	9	2	4	3	11	15	−4	10	Dissolved after season
6	Xi'an Daxing Chongde	9	2	4	3	8	10	−2	10	
7	Qingdao Red Lions	9	1	5	3	4	7	−3	8	
8	Hebei Aoli Jingying	9	1	3	5	5	9	−4	6	
9	Inner Mongolia Caoshangfei	9	0	5	4	6	13	−7	5	
10	Jiangsu Yancheng Dingli (R, R)	9	0	5	4	4	14	−10	5	Qualification to relegation play-offs and dissolved after season

Rules for classification:
- During season: 1) Points; 2) Goal difference; 3) Goals scored.
- After season: 1) Points; 2) Head-to-head points; 3) Head-to-head goal difference; 4) Head-to-head goals scored; 5) Scores of the weight ratio of the reserve league and youth leagues.
  (D) Disqualified; (P) Promoted; (R) Relegated

=== Results ===
Home \ Away	BIT	HBE	IMC	JYD	NJF	QDJ	QDR	QDZ	SZB	XAD
Beijing BIT		2–1	0–0				2–0	2–0	2–1	
Hebei Aoli Jingying				1–0	0–1	0–1				0–1
Inner Mongolia Caoshangfei		0–0			0–2	3–3		0–2	1–3	
Jiangsu Yancheng Dingli	0–4		1–1			0–2			1–1	2–2
Nanjing Fengfan	1–0			3–0		2–1				2–0
Qingdao Jonoon	1–1						0–0	2–0	4–1	0–0
Qingdao Red Lions		1–1	1–1	0–0	1–2					
Qingdao Zhongchuang Hengtai		2–1		0–0	1–2		1–0			1–1
Shenzhen Bogang		1–1			1–1		0–0	1–4		
Xi'an Daxing Chongde	2–2		1–0				0–1		1–2	

Legend: Blue = home team win; Yellow = draw; Red = away team win.
For upcoming matches, an "a" indicates there is an article about the rivalry between the two participants.

=== Positions by round ===
To preserve chronological evolvements, any postponed matches are not included to the round at which they were originally scheduled, but added to the full round they were played immediately afterwards. For example, if a match is scheduled for round 7, but then played between rounds 8 and 9, it will be added to the standings for round 8.

Team ╲ Round	1	2	3	4	5	6	7	8	9
Nanjing Fengfan	1	1	1	1	2	1	1	1	1
Beijing BIT	2	2	2	2	1	2	3	2	2
Qingdao Jonoon	7	4	4	3	3	3	2	3	3
Qingdao Zhongchuang Hengtai	4	8	5	6	4	5	4	4	4
Shenzhen Bogang	5	3	3	4	5	6	7	5	5
Xi'an Daxing Chongde	6	6	6	5	6	4	5	6	6
Qingdao Red Lions	8	5	7	7	7	7	6	7	7
Hebei Aoli Jingying	9	10	10	10	10	10	10	8	8
Inner Mongolia Caoshangfei	10	7	8	9	8	8	8	9	9
Jiangsu Yancheng Dingli	3	9	9	8	9	9	9	10	10

Qualification to promotion play-offs
Qualification to relegation play-offs

=== Results by match played ===
Team ╲ Round	1	2	3	4	5	6	7	8	9
Beijing BIT	W	W	D	W	W	D	L	W	D
Hebei Aoli Jingying	L	L	D	L	L	L	D	W	D
Inner Mongolia Caoshangfei	L	D	D	L	D	D	L	L	D
Jiangsu Yancheng Dingli	D	L	D	D	L	D	L	L	D
Nanjing Fengfan	W	W	D	W	W	W	W	W	W
Qingdao Jonoon	D	W	D	W	D	W	W	D	L
Qingdao Red Lions	D	D	L	D	D	L	W	L	D
Qingdao Zhongchuang Hengtai	D	L	W	L	W	D	W	L	W
Shenzhen Bogang	D	W	D	L	D	L	D	W	L
Xi'an Daxing Chongde	D	L	D	W	L	W	L	D	D

W = Win; D = Draw; L = Loss

== Group B ==
=== League table ===
Pos	Team	Pld	W	D	L	GF	GA	GD	Pts	Qualification or relegation
1	Wuhan Three Towns (P)	10	8	0	2	18	5	+13	24	Qualification to promotion play-offs
2	Zibo Cuju (P)	10	7	1	2	14	8	+6	22	Qualification to promotion play-offs
3	Hubei Chufeng United	10	6	0	4	11	9	+2	18	
4	Shanghai Jiading Boji	10	5	2	3	10	5	+5	17	
5	Yunnan Kunlu	10	4	3	3	8	6	+2	15	
6	Zhejiang Yiteng	10	3	5	2	9	9	0	14	
7	China U-19	10	4	1	5	12	10	+2	13	
8	Xi'an UKD	10	3	4	3	10	11	−1	13	
9	Hunan Billows	10	4	0	6	10	17	−7	12	
10	Guangxi Baoyun	10	2	2	6	8	13	−5	8	
11	Shanxi Longjin (O)	10	0	0	10	4	21	−17	0	Qualification to relegation play-offs

Rules for classification:
- During season: 1) Points; 2) Goal difference; 3) Goals scored.
- After season: 1) Points; 2) Head-to-head points; 3) Head-to-head goal difference; 4) Head-to-head goals scored; 5) Scores of the weight ratio of the reserve league and youth leagues.
  (O) Play-off winners; (P) Promoted

=== Results ===
Home \ Away	CHN	GXB	HBC	HNB	SJB	SXL	WHT	UKD	YNK	ZJY	ZBC
China U-19		2–0	0–1	1–2	0–1				0–1		
Guangxi Baoyun							0–1	2–2	0–1	0–0	
Hubei Chufeng United		3–2			0–3			0–1		0–1	1–0
Hunan Billows		2–3	0–4		1–0	2–1					0–1
Shanghai Jiading Boji		1–0				2–1	0–1	0–0	0–0		
Shanxi Longjin	0–2	0–1	0–1					0–2	1–2	0–3	
Wuhan Three Towns	1–2		2–0	3–0		4–0			1–0		
Xi'an UKD	0–3			2–1			1–2				1–2
Yunnan Kunlu			0–1	0–1				1–1		1–1	2–0
Zhejiang Yiteng	1–1			2–1	0–2		0–3	0–0			1–1
Zibo Cuju	3–1	1–0			2–1	2–1	2–0				

Legend: Blue = home team win; Yellow = draw; Red = away team win.
For upcoming matches, an "a" indicates there is an article about the rivalry between the two participants.

=== Positions by round ===
To preserve chronological evolvements, any postponed matches are not included to the round at which they were originally scheduled, but added to the full round they were played immediately afterwards. For example, if a match is scheduled for round 7, but then played between rounds 8 and 9, it will be added to the standings for round 8.

Team ╲ Round	1	2	3	4	5	6	7	8	9	10	11
Wuhan Three Towns	5	1	1	1	2	1	1	1	1	1	1
Zibo Cuju	10	4	5	3	5	6	4	2	2	2	2
Hubei Chufeng United	4	7	7	9	9	10	8	4	3	3	3
Shanghai Jiading Boji	1	2	2	2	1	3	3	6	8	4	4
Yunnan Kunlu	3	3	6	6	3	2	2	5	7	6	5
Zhejiang Yiteng	11	9	8	8	8	5	5	8	9	5	6
China U-19	7	11	11	10	10	9	6	3	4	7	7
Xi'an UKD	6	8	9	7	4	8	9	7	6	8	8
Hunan Billows	2	5	3	5	7	4	7	9	5	9	9
Guangxi Baoyun	9	6	4	4	6	7	10	10	10	10	10
Shanxi Longjin	8	10	10	11	11	11	11	11	11	11	11

Qualification to promotion play-offs
Qualification to relegation play-offs

=== Results by match played ===
Team ╲ Round	1	2	3	4	5	6	7	8	9	10	11
China U-19	L	L	L	W	L	W	W	W	D	L	N
Guangxi Baoyun	L	W	W	D	L	L	L	L	D	N	L
Hubei Chufeng United	W	L	N	L	W	L	W	W	W	L	W
Hunan Billows	W	L	W	N	L	W	L	L	W	L	L
Shanghai Jiading Boji	W	D	W	D	W	L	L	L	N	W	W
Shanxi Longjin	L	N	L	L	L	L	L	L	L	L	L
Wuhan Three Towns	W	W	W	L	N	W	W	W	L	W	W
Xi'an UKD	N	D	L	W	W	L	D	W	D	L	D
Yunnan Kunlu	W	D	L	D	W	W	N	L	L	W	D
Zhejiang Yiteng	L	D	D	D	W	W	D	N	D	W	L
Zibo Cuju	L	W	D	W	L	N	W	W	W	W	W

W = Win; D = Draw; L = Loss

== Promotion play-offs ==
=== Overview ===
Team 1	Agg.	Team 2	1st leg	2nd leg
Zibo Cuju	2–0	Nanjing Fengfan	2–0	0–0
Beijing BIT	1–2	Wuhan Three Towns	1–2	0–0

=== First leg ===
5 December 2020
15:00 UTC+8

Zibo Cuju	2–0	Nanjing Fengfan
Xie Wenneng 10'; Zhang Fengyu 64'

Haigeng Football Training Base Field 16, Kunming
Attendance: 0
Referee: Ma Li

5 December 2020
15:00 UTC+8

Beijing BIT	1–2	Wuhan Three Towns
Wang Jian 27'		Deng Zhuoxiang 26'; Nie Aoshuang 49'

Haigeng Football Training Base Field 5, Kunming
Attendance: 0
Referee: Liu Wei

=== Second leg ===
9 December 2020
15:00 UTC+8

Nanjing Fengfan	0–0	Zibo Cuju

Haigeng Football Training Base Field 16, Kunming
Attendance: 0
Referee: Zhang Xiaochen

Zibo Cuju won 2–0 on aggregate.

9 December 2020
15:00 UTC+8

Wuhan Three Towns	0–0	Beijing BIT

Haigeng Football Training Base Field 5, Kunming
Attendance: 0
Referee: Li Zheng

Wuhan Three Towns won 2–1 on aggregate.

== 3rd–4th place playoff ==
=== Overview ===
Team 1	Score	Team 2
Nanjing Fengfan	2–1 (a.e.t.)	Beijing BIT

=== Match ===
12 December 2020
14:00 UTC+8

Nanjing Fengfan	2–1 (a.e.t.)	Beijing BIT
Jiang Shichao 44'; Yu Zengpin 109' (pen.)		Tan Dinghao 23'

Haigeng Football Training Base Field 5, Kunming
Attendance: 0
Referee: Liu Wei

== Final ==
=== Overview ===
Team 1	Score	Team 2
Zibo Cuju	1–1 (4–5 p)	Wuhan Three Towns

=== Match ===
12 December 2020
15:00 UTC+8

Zibo Cuju	1–1 (a.e.t.)	Wuhan Three Towns
Du Yuxin 68'	Match report	Qu Cheng 75'
Penalties
Wang Boren (penalty missed); Zhou Jiahao (penalty scored); Sun Enming (penalty scored); Men Yang (penalty scored); Ling Sihao (penalty scored)	4–5	(penalty scored) Deng Zhuoxiang; (penalty scored) Su Di; (penalty scored) Nie Aoshuang; (penalty scored) Xiong Fei; (penalty scored) Zhou Liao

Haigeng Football Training Base Field 12, Kunming
Attendance: 0
Referee: Ma Li

== Relegation play-offs ==
=== Overview ===
Team 1	Agg.	Team 2	1st leg	2nd leg
Shanxi Longjin	1–3	Jiangsu Yancheng Dingli	0–1	1–2

=== First leg ===
6 December 2020
15:00 UTC+8

Shanxi Longjin	0–1	Jiangsu Yancheng Dingli
		Ma Jun 89' (pen.)

Haigeng Football Training Base Field 2, Kunming
Attendance: 0
Referee: Liu Zhao

=== Second leg ===
10 December 2020
15:00 UTC+8

Jiangsu Yancheng Dingli	2–1	Shanxi Longjin
Ma Jun 54'; Li Chao 62'		Yan Tengfei 59'

Haigeng Football Training Base Field 2, Kunming
Attendance: 0
Referee: Kou Jianxun

Jiangsu Yancheng Dingli won 3–1 on aggregate.

== Top scorers ==
As of 12 December 2020

Rank	Player	Club	Goals
1	(China) Yu Zengpin	Nanjing Fengfan	7
2	(China) Shi Jun	Yunnan Kunlu	5
3	(China) Tan Xiang	Hunan Billows	4
3	(China) Wang Minjie	Beijing BIT	4
3	(China) Li Kai	Qingdao Zhongchuang Hengtai	4
3	(China) Sun Yue	Shanghai Jiading Boji	4
3	(China) Sang Yifei	Wuhan Three Towns	4
8	(China) Duan Dezhi	China U19	3
8	(China) Wu Dingmao	Xi'an UKD	3
8	(China) Xu Xin	Xi'an UKD	3
8	(China) Li Sichen	Beijing BIT	3
8	(China) Zhang Bin	Qingdao Zhongchuang Hengtai	3
8	(China) Chen Jiaqi	Qingdao Jonoon	3
8	(China) Lu Jingsen	Shenzhen Bogang	3
8	(China) Xu Bin	Shanghai Jiading Boji	3
8	(China) Zhang Zongzheng	Qingdao Red Lions	3
8	(China) Zhang Fengyu	Zibo Cuju	3
8	(China) Wang Jian	Beijing BIT	3
8	(China) Qu Cheng	Wuhan Three Towns	3
