= Guo Song =

Chinese footballer

Guo Song 郭松
Personal information
- Date of birth: 22 January 1993 (age 33)
- Place of birth: Baoding, Hebei, China
- Height: 1.74 m (5 ft 9 in)
- Position: Midfielder

Team information
- Current team: Jiangxi Lushan
- Number: 33

Youth career
- –2011: Hebei Youth
- 2013–2014: Shijiazhuang Ever Bright

Senior career*
Years	Team	Apps	(Gls)
2012	Hebei Youth	24	(0)
2015–2019	Shijiazhuang Ever Bright	9	(1)
2015–2016	→ Torcatense (loan)	3	(0)
2020–2022	Guangxi Pingguo Haliao	39	(10)
2022	Dandong Tengyue	7	(1)
2023–2024	Wuxi Wugo	54	(5)
2025–	Jiangxi Lushan	2	(0)
- * Club domestic league appearances and goals as of 19 May 2024

Guo Song (Chinese: 郭松; born 22 January 1993) is a Chinese professional footballer who plays as a midfielder for Jiangxi Lushan.

== Career ==
Guo Song started his professional football career in 2012 when he joined Hebei Youth for the 2012 China League Two campaign. Failing to join Hebei Zhongji, he moved to another China League One club Shijiazhuang Ever Bright in 2013. On 23 August 2015, Guo made his debut for Shijiazhuang in the 2015 Chinese Super League against Chongqing Lifan, coming on as a substitute for Li Chao in the 94th minute. On 15 September 2015, Guo was loaned to Campeonato Nacional de Seniores side Torcatense. Guo scored his first senior goal on 11 March 2017 in a 2–1 win against Yunnan Lijiang.

== Career statistics ==
Statistics accurate as of match played 19 May 2024.

Appearances and goals by club, season and competition
Club	Season	League			National Cup		Continental		Other		Total	
Club	Season	Division	Apps	Goals	Apps	Goals	Apps	Goals	Apps	Goals	Apps	Goals
Hebei Youth	2012	China League Two	24	0	-		-		-		24	0
Shijiazhuang Ever Bright	2015	Chinese Super League	1	0	1	0	-		-		2	0
Shijiazhuang Ever Bright	2016	Chinese Super League	0	0	1	0	-		-		1	0
Shijiazhuang Ever Bright	2017	China League One	6	1	1	0	-		-		7	1
Shijiazhuang Ever Bright	2018	China League One	2	0	1	0	-		-		3	0
Shijiazhuang Ever Bright	Total		9	1	4	0	0	0	0	0	13	1
Torcatense (loan)	2015–16	Campeonato de Portugal	3	0	0	0	-		-		3	0
Guangxi Pingguo Haliao	2020	China League Two	8	1	-		-		-		8	1
Guangxi Pingguo Haliao	2021	China League Two	23	9	0	0	-		2 (Note: Appearances in Promotion/Relegation Play-offs)	0	25	9
Guangxi Pingguo Haliao	2022	China League One	8	0	0	0	-		-		8	0
Guangxi Pingguo Haliao	Total		39	10	0	0	0	0	2	0	41	10
Dandong Tengyue	2022	China League Two	7	1	0	0	-		-		7	1
Wuxi Wugo	2023	China League One	27	3	1	0	-		-		28	3
Wuxi Wugo	2024	China League One	9	2	1	0	-		-		10	2
Wuxi Wugo	Total		36	5	2	0	0	0	0	0	38	5
Career total			118	17	6	0	0	0	2	0	126	17
