= Nie Aoshuang =

Chinese footballer (born 1995)

Personal information
- Date of birth: 16 January 1995 (age 31)
- Place of birth: Yichang, China
- Height: 1.80 m (5 ft 11 in)
- Position: Midfielder

Team information
- Current team: Hubei Istar
- Number: 20

Senior career*
Years	Team	Apps	(Gls)
2014–2019	Wuhan Zall	58	(1)
2020	Shenzhen FC	0	(0)
2020	→ Wuhan Three Towns (loan)	11	(1)
2021	Wuhan Three Towns	19	(1)
2022	Wuhan Yangtze River	28	(0)
2023	Nanjing City	20	(0)
2024–2025	Qingdao Red Lions	45	(2)
2026–	Hubei Istar	0	(0)

International career^{‡}
2017–2018	China U23	4	(0)
- * Club domestic league appearances and goals as of 14:01, 12 October 2025 (UTC) ‡ National team caps and goals as of 14:01, 6 December 2019 (UTC)

Nie Aoshuang (simplified Chinese: 聂傲双; traditional Chinese: 聶傲雙; pinyin: Niè 'Àoshuāng; born 16 January 1995) is a Chinese footballer currently playing as a midfielder for Chinese League Two club Hubei Istar.

== Club career ==
Aoshuang would play for the Wuhan Zall youth team before being sent to France to study with the FC Sochaux-Montbéliard football team for three months. On his return he would be promoted to the senior team and go on to be a squad player before signing a new contract with the club on 1 July 2016. He would go on to score his first goal for the club on 4 April 2018 in a league game against Liaoning F.C. that ended in a 4-0 victory. He would go on to aid the team to promotion to the top tier by winning the 2018 China League One division. On 1 December 2019, Nie would make his Chinese Super League debut against Hebei China Fortune F.C. in a 2-1 defeat.

On 16 July 2020, Nie signed for fellow top tier club Shenzhen, however he was immediately loaned out to third tier football club Wuhan Three Towns F.C. for the 2020 China League Two season. At Wuhan Three Towns he immediately established himself as a vital member of the team and go on to win promotion and the division title with the club.

== Career statistics ==
As of match played 12 October 2025

Club	Season	League			National Cup		Continental		Other		Total	
Club	Season	Division	Apps	Goals	Apps	Goals	Apps	Goals	Apps	Goals	Apps	Goals
Wuhan Zall	2014	China League One	0	0	1	0	–		–		1	0
Wuhan Zall	2015	China League One	1	0	1	0	–		–		2	0
Wuhan Zall	2016	China League One	13	0	1	0	–		–		14	0
Wuhan Zall	2017	China League One	29	0	0	0	–		–		29	0
Wuhan Zall	2018	China League One	14	1	0	0	–		–		14	1
Wuhan Zall	2019	Chinese Super League	1	0	1	0	–		–		2	0
Wuhan Zall	Total		58	1	4	0	0	0	0	0	62	1
Wuhan Three Towns (loan)	2020	China League Two	11	1	–		–		–		11	1
Wuhan Three Towns	2021	China League One	19	1	2	0	–		–		21	1
Wuhan Three Towns	Total		30	2	2	0	0	0	0	0	32	2
Wuhan Yangtze River	2022	Chinese Super League	28	0	0	0	–		–		28	0
Nanjing City	2023	China League One	20	0	1	0	–		–		21	0
Qingdao Red Lions	2024	China League One	22	1	1	0	–		–		23	1
Qingdao Red Lions	2025	China League One	23	1	0	0	–		–		23	1
Qingdao Red Lions	Total		45	2	1	0	0	0	0	0	46	2
Career total			181	3	8	0	0	0	0	0	189	3

== Honours ==
=== Club ===
Wuhan Zall

- China League One: 2018

Wuhan Three Towns F.C.

- China League One: 2021
- China League Two: 2020
