= Kwon Ryong-jun =

North Korean football manager (born 1975)

Personal information
- Date of birth: 9 October 1975 (age 51)
- Place of birth: North Korea

Managerial career
- Years: Team
- 2018–2019: April 25
- 2019–2021: Dandong Tengyue

Kwon Ryong-jun (born 9 October 1975) is a North Korean football manager who is last known to have managed Dandong Tengyue. Besides North Korea, he has managed in China.

== Career ==
In 2018, Kwon was appointed manager of North Korean side April 25. In 2019, he was appointed manager of Dandong Tengyue in the Chinese fourth division, helping them achieve promotion to the Chinese third division, China League Two.
