= Heze Caozhou F.C. =

Chinese football club

Heze Caozhou
- Full name: Heze Caozhou Football Club 菏泽市曹州足球俱乐部
- Founded: 14 February 2019; 6 years ago
- Ground: Heze City Football Academy Stadium
- Capacity: 1,000
- Owner: Jia Qiwu
- 2025: Chinese Champions League: Yinchuan region, 2nd of 8

Heze Caozhou Football Club (simplified Chinese: 菏泽市曹州足球俱乐部; traditional Chinese: 菏澤市曹州足球俱樂部; pinyin: Hézé Shì Cáozhōu Zúqiú Jùlèbù) is a Chinese football club based in Heze, Shandong.

Heze Caozhou gained entry to 2020 China League Two but withdrew before the start of the season.

== Current squad ==
As of 12 March 2019

Note: Flags indicate national team as defined under FIFA eligibility rules; some limited exceptions apply. Players may hold more than one non-FIFA nationality.

No.	Pos.	Nation	Player
1	GK	CHN	Liu Ning
3	DF	CHN	Yang Zhao
4	MF	CHN	Wang Helong
5	DF	CHN	Zhao Zongkai
6	DF	CHN	Zhang Dapeng
7	MF	CHN	Gao Xinyu
8	MF	CHN	Zhang Yuyu
9	MF	CHN	Xu Meng
10	FW	CHN	Li Kai
11	FW	CHN	Kao Yanglu
13	MF	CHN	Dong Ke
14	DF	CHN	Wu Fei
17	DF	CHN	Sun Yimeng
15	DF	CHN	Wang Guangfu
19	DF	CHN	Xing Bin
20	MF	CHN	Xue Xitong
21	FW	CHN	Yin Meng
22	DF	CHN	Zhang Yan
29	DF	CHN	Gao Jichao
33	MF	CHN	Shi Beisi
35	MF	CHN	Yi Huaixin
37	MF	CHN	Zhou Haoze
