= Xi'an Wolves F.C. =

Chinese association football club

Xi'an Wolves F.C. 西安骏狼
- Full name: Xi'an Wolves Football Club 西安骏狼足球俱乐部
- Founded: 8 March 2018; 7 years ago
- Dissolved: April 2022; 3 years ago
- 2021: League Two, 14th of 24
Home colours	Away colours

Xi'an Wolves Football Club (Chinese: 西安骏狼足球俱乐部) is a defunct Chinese football club that participated in the China League Two. The team was based in Xi'an, Shaanxi.

== History ==
Xi'an Daxing Chongde Football Club was established on 8 March 2018 by football fan Yang Xiaolong, who in the previous year has taken over Xi'an Anxinyuan and participated in the 2017 China Amateur Football League. For the club's first-year campaign in the 2018 Chinese Champions League, they managed to finish 1st in the group stage after winning its first 3 debut matches, and advanced to the national play-off stage after beating Xi'an Huilong by drawing 1–1 with them in regular time and winning 3–0 in penalties in the group stage play-off. Although they lost both rounds to Shanxi Metropolis in the first round of the national play-offs and was ranked the last, the team was later admitted into 2019 China League Two in order to fill vacancy created by withdrawn team.

Ahead of the 2021 season, they changed their name to Xi'an Wolves F.C..

The club was dissolved after the 2021 season.

== Name history ==
- 2018–2020 Xi'an Daxing Chongde F.C. 西安大兴崇德
- 2021 Xi'an Wolves F.C. 西安骏狼

== Results ==
All-time league rankings

As of the end of 2019 season.

Year	Div	Pld	W	D	L	GF	GA	GD	Pts	Pos.	FA Cup	Super Cup	AFC	Att./G	Stadium
2018	4									16	DNQ	DNQ	DNQ		Northwestern Polytechnical University (Chang'an Campus) Stadium
2019	3	30	5	4	21	18	64	−46	19^{1}	30	R1	DNQ	DNQ		Northwestern Polytechnical University (Chang'an Campus) Stadium

- ^1 in North Group.

Key

	China top division
	China second division
	China third division
	China fourth division
W	Winners
RU	Runners-up
3	Third place
	Relegated

- Pld = Played
- W = Games won
- D = Games drawn
- L = Games lost
- F = Goals for
- A = Goals against
- Pts = Points
- Pos = Final position
- DNQ = Did not qualify
- DNE = Did not enter
- NH = Not held
- WD = Withdrawal
- – = Does not exist
- R1 = Round 1
- R2 = Round 2
- R3 = Round 3
- R4 = Round 4
- F = Final
- SF = Semi-finals
- QF = Quarter-finals
- R16 = Round of 16
- Group = Group stage
- GS2 = Second Group stage
- QR1 = First Qualifying Round
- QR2 = Second Qualifying Round
- QR3 = Third Qualifying Round
