= Shenzhen Bogang F.C. =

Football club in Shenzhen

Shenzhen Bogang
- Full name: Shenzhen Bogang Football Club 深圳壆岗足球俱乐部
- Founded: 1998; 27 years ago
- Ground: Bogang Football Pitch, Shenzhen, China
- League: Shenzhen FA City Super League
- 2024: Shenzhen FA City Super League, 6th of 10
Home colours	Away colours

Shenzhen Bogang Football Club (simplified Chinese: 深圳壆岗足球俱乐部; traditional Chinese: 深圳壆崗足球俱樂部; pinyin: Shēnzhèn Bógǎng Zúqiú Jùlèbù) is a Chinese semi-professional football club based in Shenzhen, that competes in the Shenzhen FA City Super League, the fifth tier of Chinese football. It is located in the Bogang Community (formerly Village) in Shajing Street, Shenzhen. Being able to trace its origins back in 1941, when the village team of Bogang was established under Japanese occupation, it boasted the record of the oldest Chinese football squad that was active. To add on that, it was also the team that had won the most championships (5) in the Chinese Champions League, the Chinese fourth tier (including its predecessor National Football Amateur (Class C) League); however, it stopped participating in the fourth tier until the 2019 season, as they won second place and were promoted.

== History ==
=== Early history ===
The village of Bogang has a long history of football and is known as the "Hometown of Football". Its football history can be traced back to 1941, when the Japanese invading China and occupying Hong Kong, as about 100 villagers who were making a living in Hong Kong, and were members of the Hong Kong football team, returned to their home village and continued to resist Japan. In order to continue the anti-Japanese War, the returning youths set up the first football team in Bogang. It was reported that the players used football to share secret information, as sports was considered legitimate by the Japanese and such gatherings were allowed.

As Shenzhen was named a "Special economics zone" in 1980, many villages in Shenzhen became rich. Villagers of Bogang decided to avoid bad habits from those villages from affecting them, so in 1992, football was included in the quality education program for the villagers of Bogang Village.

Children in Bogang started football training in elementary school. Of the more than 1,800 residents in the Bogang community, 80% of the males can play football. Football teams were formed from different age groups of residents, from children to the elderly, with the oldest player being over 80 years old. There are more than 220 football players in the entire community, and as many as 800 residents involved in football.

=== Formation of a club ===
In 1998, with the approval of the Chinese Football Association, Bogang established the country's first village-level football club, and the Bogang football team has become the first amateur team in the country to have a dedicated football field.

In 2002, the Chinese Champions League was established. The Bogang Football Team became one of the founding teams of the tournament. In the same year, under the leadership of coach Ding Sheng, they won 2nd place, only beaten 3–1 by Guangzhou Restaurant.

In 2003, they defeated Hunan Sports in a 7–6 penalty shootout after a 1–1 draw. In 2004, they defeated Qingdao Liming 2–0 after finishing top of Group B and defeating Yunnan Satellite Channel in a penalty shootout. In 2005, they again won the championship, after defeating Shanghai Songjiang Gas. In 2006, they defeated Changchun Normal University 3–1. In 2007, they again won the championship after defeating Yanji Court, winning the championship for 5 consecutive times.

Due to their outstanding performances, the Chinese Football Association and other relevant parties have asked them to be promoted to the China League Two, but the then owner of the club, Boang Co., Ltd. (an economic entity restructured from the collective property of Bogang Village), declined the request as they considered the investments in playing professionally too large, and defied their original will of "free-for-all" football. In the 12 years afterwards, they only played in regional contests. In 2018, the Palm Eco-Town Development Company Limited, (owned by Championship team West Brom's current chairman Lai Guochuan), officially participated in the investment in Shenzhen Bogang Football Club, and on July 10, 2018, Shenzhen Bogang Football Club Co., Ltd. was formally established, and Li Haiqiang, who had led former club Meixian Techand to League 1, was hired as the team coach. On March 14, 2019, Shenzhen Bogang held the ceremony to begin its quest for League 2 that year. It played its first match in the new, but familiar Chinese Champions League, beating Nanning Binjiang 5–0. Later, they managed to advance to the final stages and eventually to the final of 2019 Chinese Champions League. On 19 October, they won 2–1 against Nanjing Fengfan in the first leg of the final at home, but they were defeated 4–1 in the away leg at Nanjing, and finished as runners-up in the league, gaining promotion to the China League Two for the first time in its 78 years of existence.

== Current squad ==
=== First team ===
As of 25 October 2020

Note: Flags indicate national team as defined under FIFA eligibility rules; some limited exceptions apply. Players may hold more than one non-FIFA nationality.

No.	Pos.	Nation	Player
1	GK	CHN	Qiu Jipeng
2	DF	CHN	Song Xicun
3	DF	CHN	Li Bin
4	DF	CHN	Gong Liangxuan
5	DF	CHN	Liu Shuai
6	MF	CHN	Chen Junhua
7	FW	CHN	Hu Yangyang
8	DF	CHN	Ye Shuwen
9	FW	CHN	Dilmurat Batur
10	FW	CHN	Tan Jiajun
11	FW	CHN	Gan Tiancheng
12	MF	CHN	Chen Yian
13	DF	CHN	Li Weixin
17	FW	CHN	Hu Weiwei
18	MF	CHN	Chen Hanzhu

No.	Pos.	Nation	Player
19	GK	CHN	Chen Jinming
23	FW	CHN	Chen Bofeng
24	DF	CHN	Chen Junbang
27	DF	CHN	Ni Bo
29	DF	CHN	Zhang Hongnan
31	FW	CHN	Lin Zhaoming
42	FW	CHN	Lu Jingsen
45	DF	CHN	Chen Jinhao
47	MF	CHN	Li Guohao
50	GK	CHN	Fu Zhongyi
51	DF	CHN	Chen Yanyuan
52	MF	CHN	Tang Qirun
55	DF	CHN	Zhang Jianming

== Formation of players ==
Most of the members of the Bogang football team are college students in the area, and many of them are studying at the Guangzhou Sport University to receive professional football training. The team also attracted a number of retired stars to join, such as the retired internationals Hu Zhijun, Yao Devie, Zhang Yuewen and so on. Although Bogang is only an amateur team, its strength is comparable to a professional team.

=== Academies ===
Bogang has a set of effective football training systems, with football teams of all ages from children, teenagers, youth to adulthood, seniors and other groups, and also the women's team. Some members from the youth academy including Lin Jianwei and Chen Bofeng were chosen for the Chinese Junior Football Team.

== Honours ==
Chinese Champions League
Awards	Years
Champions	2003, 2004, 2005, 2006, 2007
Runners-up	2002, 2019
