= Tianjin Dongli F.C. =

Chinese football club

Tianjin Dongli 天津东丽
- Full name: Tianjin Dongli Football Club 天津东丽足球俱乐部
- Founded: 5 May 2006; 18 years ago
- Dissolved: December 2008 (16 years ago)
- Ground: Dongli Sports Centre, Tianjin
- Chairman: (China) 魏宝桐
- Manager: (China) 沈福儒
- League: China Yi League
- 2008: 7th, Northern Group
Home colours	Away colours

Tianjin Dongli (Simplified Chinese: 天津东丽) was a football club based in Tianjin, China.
