= Shaanxi Warriors Beyond F.C. =

Chinese football club

Shaanxi Warriors Beyond 陕西俑士超越
- Full name: Shaanxi Warriors Beyond Football Club 陕西俑士超越足球俱乐部
- Founded: 2019; 7 years ago
- Manager: Huang Hongyi
- League: Chinese Champions League
- 2021: League Two, 24th of 24 (relegated)

Shaanxi Warriors Beyond Football Club (Chinese: 陕西俑士超越足球俱乐部) was a Chinese professional football club that last competed in China League Two. The team was based in Xi'an, Shaanxi.

== History ==
Xi'an UKD was founded in 2019. In March 2021, Xi'an UKD changed its name to Shaanxi Warriors Beyond.

== Current squad ==
=== First team ===
As of 1 January 2022

Note: Flags indicate national team as defined under FIFA eligibility rules; some limited exceptions apply. Players may hold more than one non-FIFA nationality.

No.	Pos.	Nation	Player
1	GK	CHN	Liu Yunfei
2	DF	CHN	Li Jiachen
3	DF	CHN	Chen Luoqi
4	DF	CHN	Sun Yi
5	DF	CHN	Zhai Ruide
9	FW	CHN	Gao Zhijie
10	MF	CHN	Jiang Zejun
11	FW	CHN	Yang Wenjie
14	FW	CHN	Chen Zijie
15	DF	CHN	Wang Shiwei
16	MF	CHN	Khorchinv
17	MF	CHN	Sun Ya
18	DF	CHN	Zhu Di
19	DF	CHN	Zhang Hao
20	MF	CHN	Zhang Yong

No.	Pos.	Nation	Player
21	FW	CHN	Qin Beichen
22	DF	CHN	Ding Bowei
25	DF	CHN	Meng Xiangqi
26	MF	CHN	Li Yiming
27	MF	CHN	Wang Long
29	DF	CHN	Cui Ning
30	DF	CHN	Zhang Linguang
34	GK	CHN	Han Zhen
38	DF	CHN	Gao Kun
39	MF	CHN	Zhang Heng
45	DF	CHN	Imamhesen Ababekri
46	MF	CHN	Miladil Akim
52	MF	CHN	Hao Yujie
55	DF	CHN	Huo Mengyang
58	GK	CHN	Zhang Liangjun

== Reserve squad ==
As of 31 July 2021

Note: Flags indicate national team as defined under FIFA eligibility rules; some limited exceptions apply. Players may hold more than one non-FIFA nationality.

No.	Pos.	Nation	Player
6	MF	CHN	Rong Linchao
7	MF	CHN	Shen Feng
8	MF	CHN	Tian Riliang

No.	Pos.	Nation	Player
51	DF	CHN	Liu Weihan
57	MF	CHN	Jiang Tao
