= Kunming Zheng He Shipman F.C. =

Chinese association football club

Kunming Zheng He Shipman 昆明郑和船工
- Full name: Kunming Zheng He Shipman Football Club 昆明郑和船工足球俱乐部
- Founded: September 2017; 8 years ago
- Dissolved: April 2022; 3 years ago
- 2021: League Two, 18th of 24

Kunming Zheng He Shipman Football Club (Chinese: 昆明郑和船工足球俱乐部) is a defunct Chinese football club that participated in the China League Two. The team was based in Kunming, Yunnan.

== History ==
The club was established in September 2017 as Yunnan Kunlu Football Club.

Ahead of the 2021 season, Yunnan Kunlu F.C. changed their name to Kunming Zheng He Shipman F.C..

The club was dissolved after 2021 season.

== Name history ==
- 2017–2020 Yunnan Kunlu F.C. 云南昆陆
- 2021 Kunming Zheng He Shipman F.C. 昆明郑和船工

== Results ==
All-time league rankings

As of the end of 2019 season.

Year	Div	Pld	W	D	L	GF	GA	GD	Pts	Pos.	FA Cup	Super Cup	AFC	Att./G	Stadium
2018	4									10th	DNQ	DNQ	DNQ		Hongta Sports Center
2019	3	30	1	10	19	21	51	−30	13	31	R3	DNQ	DNQ		Qujing Cultural Sports Park

Key

	China top division
	China second division
	China third division
	China fourth division
W	Winners
RU	Runners-up
3	Third place
	Relegated

- Pld = Played
- W = Games won
- D = Games drawn
- L = Games lost
- F = Goals for
- A = Goals against
- Pts = Points
- Pos = Final position
- DNQ = Did not qualify
- DNE = Did not enter
- NH = Not Held
- WD = Withdrawal
- – = Does Not Exist
- R1 = Round 1
- R2 = Round 2
- R3 = Round 3
- R4 = Round 4
- F = Final
- SF = Semi-finals
- QF = Quarter-finals
- R16 = Round of 16
- Group = Group stage
- GS2 = Second Group stage
- QR1 = First Qualifying Round
- QR2 = Second Qualifying Round
- QR3 = Third Qualifying Round
