= Qingdao Red Lions F.C. =

Chinese football club

Qingdao Red Lions Qīngdǎo Hóngshī 青岛红狮
- Full name: Qingdao Red Lions Football Club 青岛红狮足球俱乐部
- Founded: 14 March 2016; 10 years ago
- Ground: Tiantai Stadium
- Capacity: 20,525
- Chairman: Piet van der Pol
- Manager: Zhang Yang
- League: China League Two
- 2026: China League One, 16th of 24
Home colours	Away colours

Qingdao Red Lions Football Club (Chinese: 青岛红狮足球俱乐部; pinyin: Qīngdǎo Hóngshī Zúqiú Jùlèbù) is a Chinese professional football club based in Qingdao, Shandong, that competes in China League Two, the third tier of Chinese football. Qingdao Red Lions plays its home matches at the Tiantai Stadium, located within Shinan District. The club's youth training takes part in Laixi and several other districts of Qingdao.

As Adelaide and Qingdao incidentally became sister cities in 2014, building on from a sister state relationship between South Australia and Shandong which was established back in 1986 and has since evolved into a prosperous partnership, the club aims to contribute to the development of Chinese football, both on youth level as in competitive league football.

== History ==
Qingdao Red Lions was established by Piet van der Pol, and his consortium after founding the club from scratch in March 2016. The Red Lions spent the initial three years of their existence in the fourth tier, before gaining promotion to the third division known as China League Two ahead of the 2019 season. Qingdao avoided relegation in their maiden campaign in 2019, finishing two points above the drop zone.

== Club badge and colours ==
The club badge consists of a shield containing a lion's head —a symbol for strength— and Wuyue Feng (May Wind), the iconic monument on Qingdao's May Fourth Square. The 2020 home and away kit for Qingdao Red Lions are designed and manufactured by Guangzhou-based sports clothing and equipment producer UCAN.

== Stadium and training ground ==
From the start of the 2020 season, the first team play its games in the stadium at Laixi Sports Center, which was built for the 2015 Leisure Games. The stadium is facilitated with a natural grass pitch and has a capacity of 10.000 seats. Training takes places at separate training pitches at the same Laixi Sports Center.

During the 2019 China League Two season Qingdao Red Lions played its home games in the Zhonglian Sports Center in the northern Jimo district of Qingdao. In the 2017 Qingdao Super League the club played its home games at the newly developed football pitch within the Fushan Mountain Ecological Park. In the 2016 football season Qingdao Red Lions played their home games in a stadium with 10.000 seat capacity, located on the premises of a factory in Chengyang district.

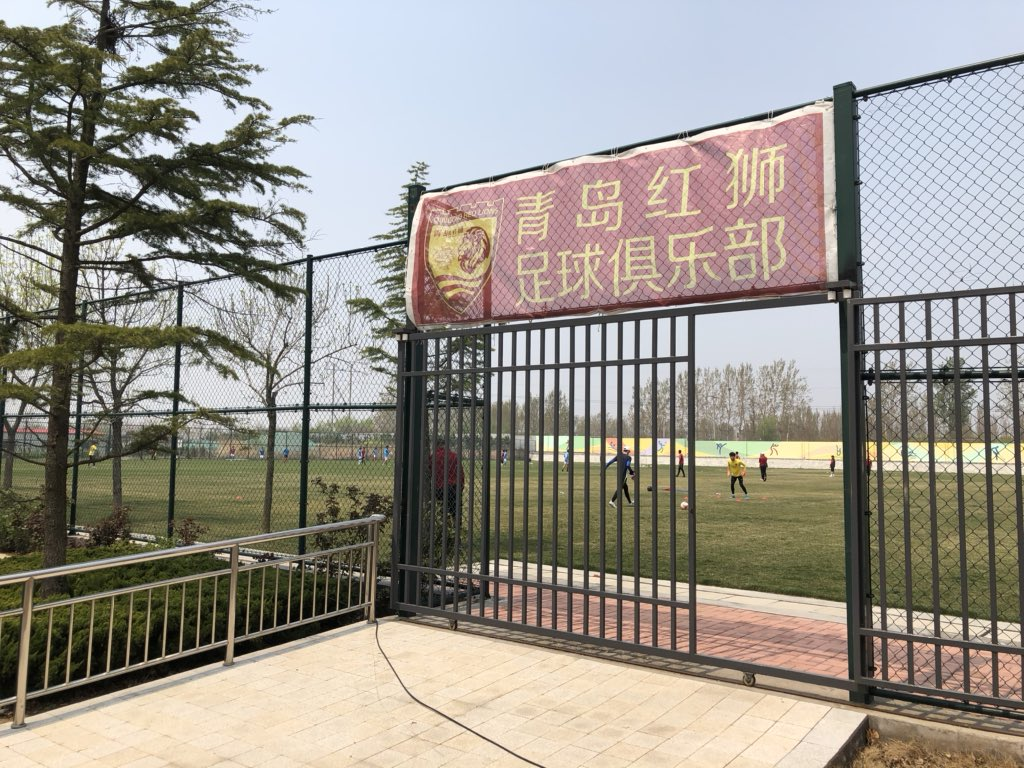
Red Lions Training Base in Laixi Sports Center

== Affiliated clubs ==
- (Australia) Adelaide United (2014–present)

Both Adelaide and Qingdao based clubs are owned by current chairman, Piet van der Pol and the goal of the partnership is to give more opportunities to Chinese players. Then Director of Football Bruce Djite has said, "The idea is to develop Chinese players to create stronger links between us and Qingdao Red Lions." Chen Yongbin was the first player to sign from Qingdao to Adelaide on a one-year deal. He did not make an appearance for the senior side but made appearances in the Y-League, he departed following the end to his contract.

== Players ==
=== Current squad ===
As of Mar 2026

Note: Flags indicate national team as defined under FIFA eligibility rules; some limited exceptions apply. Players may hold more than one non-FIFA nationality.

No.	Pos.	Nation	Player
1	GK	CHN	Wang Yihong
3	DF	CHN	Dai Bowei (on loan from Nantong Zhiyun)
4	DF	CHN	Huang Yuxuan
5	DF	CHN	Jiang Yukai
6	DF	CHN	Enysar Emet
7	MF	CHN	Li Mingfan
8	MF	CHN	Zhou Jianyi
9	FW	CHN	Chen Shihao
10	MF	CHN	Abduhelil Osmanjan (on loan from Qingdao West Coast)
11	MF	CHN	Deng Jiajie
13	DF	CHN	Yao Zhiyu
14	DF	CHN	Wen Zhengkuan
15	DF	CHN	Zong Keyi
16	DF	CHN	Jiang Kaihua (on loan from Nantong Zhiyun)
18	MF	CHN	Xu Jiashi
19	MF	CHN	Fu Jie
20	MF	CHN	Ferdanwus Mehmut

No.	Pos.	Nation	Player
22	MF	CHN	Wang Guanqiao
23	GK	CHN	Zhang Donghai
24	GK	CHN	He Zhizhe
26	DF	CHN	Mei Jingxuan
27	MF	CHN	Cao Kaidi
28	DF	CHN	Sun Xu
29	DF	CHN	Hu Hongwei
30	GK	CHN	Sheng Muze
32	MF	CHN	You Wenjie
33	MF	CHN	Sun Weijia
35	DF	CHN	Yang Minjie (on loan from Wuhan Three Towns)
36	MF	CHN	Lü Kairui

=== Out on loan ===
Note: Flags indicate national team as defined under FIFA eligibility rules; some limited exceptions apply. Players may hold more than one non-FIFA nationality.

No.	Pos.	Nation	Player

== Coaching staff ==
Position	Name	Nationality
Head coach	Zhang Yang	(China)
Assistant coach	Geng Zhiqiang	(China)
Assistant coach	Xu Xiang	(China)

=== Management ===
- (Netherlands) Piet van der Pol (president)
- (Indonesia) Esti Lestari (CEO)
- (Netherlands) Lon Weijers (COO)
- (China) Anna Zhang (Commercial Affairs)
- (Spain) Hector Buraglia (Head of Youth Academy)

=== Former notable head coaches ===
Name	Nationality	
Jan Poortvliet	(Netherlands)	19 caps for the Netherlands national team. Played during the 1978 FIFA World Cup Final against Argentina.
Gert Heerkes	(Netherlands)	Former head coach at Willem II and Heracles, both in Dutch Eredivisie, the highest league level.
Guo Zuojin	(China)	Former assistant coach of the national team of China.
Tomaž Kavčič	(Slovenia)	Former head coach of the national team of Slovenia.

== Notable players ==
- (Togo) Samuel Asamoah
- (Sweden) David Löfquist,
- (Serbia) Milan Perić
- (Ghana) Kwame Quansah
- (France) Yaya Sanogo
- Shi Hanjun
- Qiu Zhonghui

== Results ==
- 2019 China FA Cup Tournament: Qingdao Red Lions beat Chongqing High Wave in the first round, then got eliminated in the second round by Zhejiang Yiteng after a penalty shoot out.
- 2018 Qingdao FA Cup Tournament: Qingdao Fortschritt Red Lions reached the semi-finals, in which it drew with Qingdao Yinglian (1–1), but lost the penalty shoot out.
- 2018 Qingdao City Super League: Qingdao Red Lions finish 2nd.
- 2018 CFA MA Champions League finals: In the 2018 season the competition was re-branded China FA Member Associations Champions League (CMCL). Qingdao Fortschritt Red Lions in August finished second in the regional final (group 4 North) and qualified for the national finals stage. In the finals, the Red Lions lost 0–1 home and 2–1 away against Lhasa Urban Construction, after which they finished 15th.
- 2017 Qingdao FA Cup Tournament: Qingdao Fortschritt Red Lions reached the semi-finals, in which it lost to Qingdao Yinglian (0–1).
- 2017 Qingdao City Super League (6 teams): Qingdao Fortschritt Red Lions finished second in the league, one point behind champions MaiDiShen.
- 2017 China Amateur Football League Finals: Qingdao Fortschritt Red Lions qualified for the regional final tournament in Zibo, Shandong province. It finished second after wins against Jinzhong (9–0) and Luoyang (2–1) and a loss against Zibo Sunday (0–1), meaning the team did not qualify for the final phase of the national finals.
- 2016 Qingdao FA Cup Tournament: Qingdao Red Lions did not participate.
- 2016 Qingdao City Super League (6 teams): Qingdao Red Lions finished in third place, qualifying for 2016 China Amateur League finals.
- 2016 China Amateur Football League Finals: Qingdao Red Lions played the Southeast Regional final tournament that took place 1–7 October in Shanghai. It did not qualify for the national stage phase.

All-time league rankings As of the end of 2019 season.

Year	Div	Pld	W	D	L	GF	GA	GD	Pts	Pos.	FA Cup	Super Cup	AFC	Att./G	Stadium
2016	4	3	0	0	3	1	8	−7	0	4^{1}	DNQ	DNQ	DNQ		
2017	4	3	2	0	1	11	2	+9	6	2^{1}	DNQ	DNQ	DNQ		
2018	4	3	2	0	1	8	3	+5	6^{1}	15	DNQ	DNQ	DNQ		
2019	3	30	7	6	17	25	53	−28	27^{1}	24	R2	DNQ	DNQ		

- ^1 In group stage.

Key

	China top division
	China second division
	China third division
	China fourth division
W	Winners
RU	Runners-up
3	Third place
	Relegated

- Pld = Played
- W = Games won
- D = Games drawn
- L = Games lost
- F = Goals for
- A = Goals against
- Pts = Points
- Pos = Final position
- DNQ = Did not qualify
- DNE = Did not enter
- NH = Not held
- – = Does not exist
- R1 = Round 1
- R2 = Round 2
- R3 = Round 3
- R4 = Round 4
- F = Final
- SF = Semi-finals
- QF = Quarter-finals
- R16 = Round of 16
- Group = Group stage
- GS2 = Second Group stage
- QR1 = First Qualifying Round
- QR2 = Second Qualifying Round
- QR3 = Third Qualifying Round

== Youth Academy ==
Qingdao Red Lions Youth Academy has established three youth training centers in Laixi city and the Laoshan and Licang districts of Qingdao, with a total of more than 200 registered players. Qingdao Red Lions Youth Academy is led by UEFA A LEVEL professional coach Hector Buraglia from Spain. The academy coaching staff consists of AFC qualified local coaches. With the support of the Laixi Government and the local Education and Sports Bureau, Qingdao Red Lions FC is carrying out in-depth cooperation with schools to build out the club's youth development structure, and respectively make a strong contribution to develop local youth football talent.

=== Academy Notable Players ===
-Chen Yongbin – A-League – Adelaide United

In 2019 Chen Yongbin was transferred to Adelaide United, where he was registered for the 2020 A-League season.
