= 2019 Chinese FA Cup =

2019 The Chinese Football Association Cup
CFA Cup

Tournament details
- Country: China
- Dates: 21 December 2018 – 6 December 2019
- Teams: 102

Final positions
- Champions: Shanghai Greenland Shenhua (3rd title)
- Runners-up: Shandong Luneng Taishan
- AFC Champions League: Shanghai Greenland Shenhua

Tournament statistics
- Matches played: 84
- Top goal scorer: (China) Wang Feike (5 goals)

Awards
- Best player: (Italy) Stephan El Shaarawy

Yanjing Beer 2019 Chinese FA Cup (Chinese: 燕京啤酒2019中国足球协会杯) was the 21st edition of the Chinese FA Cup. The cup title sponsor was Yanjing Beer. For the first time, entrants were not seeded and there were separate draws for each round.

== Schedule ==
The schedule was as follows.

Round	Draw date	Match dates	Clubs remaining	Clubs involved	Winners from previous round	New entries this round	New Entries Notes
Qualifying Round	No draw	21 December 2018 – 31 December 2018	102	12	none	12	
First Round	25 February	9–10 March	96	64	6	58	32 2019 China League Two teams 26 Local amateur teams
Second Round	12 March	30–31 March	64	32	32	none	
Third Round	3 April	16–17 April	48	32	16	16	16 2019 China League One teams
Fourth Round	21 April	30 April–2 May	32	32	16	16	16 2019 Chinese Super League teams
Fifth Round	2 May	28–30 May	16	16	16	none	
Quarterfinals	31 May	24 July	8	8	8	none	
Semifinals	24 July	19–20 August	4	4	4	none	
Final	20 August	First Leg 1 November; Second Leg 6 December	2	2	2	none	

== Qualifying round ==
Qualifying rounds included two phases: Chinese Football Association Member Association FA Cup and Regional Finals. Teams will compete in the qualifying rounds to secure one of 27 available places in the first round, joining another five amateur clubs (Guangzhou Haoxin, Nanjing Shaye, Ningbo Yinbo, Shanghai Jiading Boji and Hubei Chufeng United) who advanced to the first round directly.

=== Teams qualified for the Regional Finals ===
Regional	Slots	FA	Qualifying teams
Northeast China	3 (Note: Four slots for the Northeast China Regional on the original. However, since just three teams signed up for the qualifying round, one slot was given to the Southwest China Regional.)	Dalian FA	Dalian Tongshun (Q), Dalian Huayi (Q)
Northeast China	3	Liaoning FA	Dandong Hantong (Q)
Northeast China	3	Shenyang FA	
North China	5	Beijing FA	
North China	5	Nei Monggol FA	Ulanqab Qile (Q)
North China	5	Qingdao FA	Qingdao Elite United (Q), Qingdao Kunpeng (Q), Qingdao Zhongchuang Hengtai
North China	5	Shandong FA	Heze Caozhou (Q), Jinan Dayou
North China	5	Shanxi FA	
North China	5	Tianjin FA	
East China	9	Anhui FA	
East China	9	Jiangsu FA	Suqian Zhongrui (Q), Taizhou Aizhilü (Q)
East China	9	Jiangxi FA	Jiangxi Hopeda (Q), Shangrao FA (Q)
East China	9	Nanjing FA	Nanjing Balanta
East China	9	Shanghai FA	Shanghai Chengxun (Q), Shanghai Huajiao (Q), Shanghai Shenshui
East China	9	Zhejiang FA	Hangzhou Wuyue Qiantang (Q), Jinhua Zhongchou (Q)
South China	4	Fujian FA	
South China	4	Guangdong FA	Zhaoqing Topfung Eastlake
South China	4	Guangxi FA	Guangxi Baoyun (Q), Liuzhou Ranko, Nanning Binjiang
South China	4	Hainan FA	Hainan Wanning Tengji (Q), Sanya Qinghao
South China	4	Shenzhen FA	
South China	4	Xiamen FA	
Central China	3	Henan FA	
Central China	3	Hubei FA	Hubei Huachuang (Q), Hubei Wuhan Athletics Zaiming (Q)
Central China	3	Hunan FA	
Central China	3	Wuhan FA	Wuhan Three Towns (Q)
Northwest China	1	Ningxia FA	Ningxia Hengjuda
Northwest China	1	Xi'an FA	Xi'an Yilian
Southwest China	2	Chongqing FA	Chongqing High Wave (Q), Chongqing Qingyuan
Southwest China	2	Sichuan FA	Sichuan Jiannanchun

=== Regional Finals ===
North China

31 December 2018	Jinan Dayou (A)	1–0	Qingdao Zhongchuang Hengtai (A)	Jinan Huaiyin Stadium, Jinan
14:30

East China

23 December 2018	Shanghai Shenshui (A)	3–3 (5–6 p)	Nanjing Balanta (A)	Shanghai Qingpu Sports Center Stadium, Shanghai
14:00

South China

21 December 2018	Sanya Qinghao (A)	1–2	Nanning Binjiang (A)	Sanya Sports Center Stadium, Sanya
20:00

29 December 2018	Liuzhou Ranko (A)	3–2	Zhaoqing Topfung Eastlake (A)	Huxi High School Football Field, Liuzhou
15:00

Northwest China

23 December 2018	Xi'an Yilian (A)	2–1	Ningxia Hengjuda (A)	Xi'an Yilian Football Park, Xi'an
14:00				Referee: Gu Zhongchao

Southwest China

23 December 2018	Chongqing Qingyuan (A)	1–0	Sichuan Jiannanchun (A)	Sun Jihai Football Base, Chongqing
14:00

== First round ==
The draw for the first round was originally scheduled on 18 February 2019. However, it was postponed to 25 February 2019 after the finally list of 2019 China League Two participants was decided. Due to the withdrawal of Shenzhen Xinqiao and Yunnan Flying Tigers as well the promotion of Shaanxi Chang'an Athletic, which directly qualified to the third round, their opponents, Kunshan F.C., Lhasa Urban Construction Investment and Qingdao Elite United received byes and advanced to the second round.

9 March 2019	Liuzhou Ranko (A)	4–0	Shangrao FA (A)	Wuling Stadium, Liuzhou
14:00

9 March 2019	Beijing BIT (3)	2–1	Yinchuan Helanshan (3)	BIT Eastern Athletic Field, Beijing
14:30				Referee: Han Lei

9 March 2019	Wuhan Three Towns (3)	0–3; Awarded (Note: CFA awarded Jinan Dayou a 3–0 win as a result of Wuhan Three Towns fielding the ineligible player. The match was originally ended 4–1.)	Jinan Dayou (A)	Tazi Lake Sports Centre Football Field 2, Wuhan
14:30				Referee: Jia Shuang

9 March 2019	Xi'an Daxing Chongde (3)	0–2	Zibo Cuju (3)	Football Field of Chang'an Campus, Northwest University, Xi'an
15:00				Referee: Gu Zhongchao

9 March 2019	Hunan Billows (3)	1–0	Shanxi Metropolis (3)	Yiyang Stadium, Yiyang
15:00				Referee: Wang Haidong

9 March 2019	Taizhou Aizhilü (A)	3–0	Ulanqab Qile (A)	Taizhou Sports Center, Taizhou
15:00

9 March 2019	Fujian Tianxin (3)	0–1	Guangxi Baoyun (3)	Fujian Normal University Stadium, Fuzhou
15:00				Referee: Zu Shanfa

9 March 2019	Zhejiang Yiteng (3)	3–1	Dalian Tongshun (A)	Shaoxing China Textile City Sports Center, Shaoxing
15:00				Referee: Zhu Di

9 March 2019	Jiangxi Liansheng (3)	1–0	Nanjing Balanta (A)	Jiujiang Stadium, Jiujiang
15:00				Referee: Li Xiaodan

9 March 2019	Shanghai Chengxun (A)	0–0 (8–9 p)	Yanbian Beiguo (3)	Yuanshen Sports Centre Stadium, Shanghai (Note: Home teams were reversed after draw.)
15:00

9 March 2019	Zhaoqing Topfung Eastlake (A)	2–4	Dalian Chanjoy (3)	Zhaoqing Sports Center, Zhaoqing
15:30				Referee: Su Yang

9 March 2019	Hainan Wanning Tengji (A)	0–5	Baoding Yingli ETS (3)	Hainan Sport School Stadium, Haikou
15:30

9 March 2019	Nanjing Shaye (3)	0–0 (4–3 p)	Qingdao Kunpeng (A)	Hohai University Stadium, Nanjing
15:30				Referee: Liu Pengfei

10 March 2019	Yingkou Chaoyue (A)	0–3	Shenyang Urban (3)	Yingkou Olympic Sports Centre Stadium, Yingkou
14:00

10 March 2019	Jinhua Zhongchou (A)	0–2	Jilin Baijia (3)	Jinhua Sports Center, Jinhua
14:00				Referee: Wang Minjie

10 March 2019	Dandong Hantong (A)	0–2	Hubei Huachuang (A)	Liaoning Normal University Haihua College Football Field, Zhuanghe
14:00				Referee: Shi Qiang

10 March 2019	Xi'an Yilian (A)	4–1	Shanghai Huajiao (A)	The High School Affiliated to Shaanxi Normal University Football Field, Xi'an
14:30

10 March 2019	Dalian Huayi (A)	1–4	Shanghai Jiading Boji (A)	Dalian Maritime University Football Field, Dalian
14:30				Referee: Zhu Huajun

10 March 2019	Chongqing Qingyuan (A)	0–5	Yunnan Kunlu (3)	Jiangjin District Stadium, Chongqing
14:30

10 March 2019	Qingdao Jonoon (3)	1–0	Suzhou Dongwu (3)	Jimo Powerise District Sports Center, Qingdao
14:30

10 March 2019	Guangzhou Haoxin (A)	2–4	Hubei Wuhan Athletics Zaiming (A)	Wuchuan Sports Centre, Wuchuan
15:00

10 March 2019	Chongqing High Wave (A)	1–2	Qingdao Red Lions (3)	Chongqing Chayuan Shengdi Football Park, Chongqing
15:00

10 March 2019	Jiangxi Hopeda (A)	0–6	Chengdu Better City (3)	Jiangxi Olympic Sports Center, Nanchang
15:00				Referee: Zhao Ming

10 March 2019	Ningbo Yinbo (A)	1–7	Hebei Aoli Jingying (3)	Jiangshan Town Middle School Football Field, Ningbo
15:00				Referee: Dan Ning

10 March 2019	Suqian Zhongrui (A)	1–2	Inner Mongolia Caoshangfei (3)	Shuyang County Sports Center, Suqian
15:00

10 March 2019	Sichuan Jiuniu (3)	5–0	Jiangsu Yancheng Dingli (3)	Chengdu Longquanyi Football Stadium, Chengdu
15:00				Referee: Tang Man

10 March 2019	Hubei Chufeng United (3)	0–2	Shenzhen Pengcheng (3)	Xinhua Road Sports Center, Wuhan
15:00				Referee: Li Shaobo

10 March 2019	Taizhou Yuanda (3)	4–0	Heze Caozhou (A)	Taixing Sports Center, Taizhou
15:00				Referee: Li Huigang

10 March 2019	Nanning Binjiang (A)	2–2 (5–4 p)	Hangzhou Wuyue Qiantang (3)	Nanning Stadium, Nanning
15:30

Kunshan F.C. (3)	w/o	Bye

Lhasa Urban Construction Investment (3)	w/o	Shenzhen Xinqiao (A)

Yunnan Flying Tigers (A)	w/o	Qingdao Elite United (A)

== Second round ==
The draw for the second round took place on 12 March 2019.

30 March 2019	Jilin Baijia (3)	3–0	Kunshan F.C. (3)	Development Area Stadium, Changchun
14:00

30 March 2019	Hubei Huachuang (A)	0–1	Qingdao Jonoon (3)	Tazi Lake Sports Centre Football Field 3, Wuhan
14:30				Referee: Kong Lingda

30 March 2019	Baoding Yingli ETS (3)	w/o (Note: Originally, Wuhan Three Towns advanced to second round. However, CFA awarded Jinan Dayou a 3–0 win as a result of Wuhan Three Towns fielding the ineligible player. However, Jinan Dayou withdrew from second round and therefore their opponent, Baoding Yingli ETS, received bye and advanced to third round.)	Bye	Hebei University Stadium, Baoding
15:00

30 March 2019	Liuzhou Ranko (A)	1–5	Hebei Aoli Jingying (3)	Baojun Homeland Football Field, Liuzhou
15:00

30 March 2019	Sichuan Jiuniu (3)	2–0	Dalian Chanjoy (3)	Nanhu Sports Center, Zigong
15:00				Referee: Jiang Ning

30 March 2019	Jiangxi Liansheng (3)	0–0 (0–3 p)	Lhasa Urban Construction Investment (3)	Ruichang Sports Park Stadium, Jiujiang
15:00				Referee: Geng Maoxiang

30 March 2019	Nanjing Shaye (3)	0–0 (7–6 p)	Chengdu Better City (3)	Nanjing Youth Olympic Sports Park, Nanjing
15:00				Referee: Zu Shanfa

30 March 2019	Zhejiang Yiteng (3)	1–1 (4–2 p)	Qingdao Red Lions (3)	Shaoxing China Textile City Sports Center, Shaoxing
15:00				Referee: Wang Haidong

30 March 2019	Taizhou Yuanda (3)	1–0	Beijing BIT (3)	Taixing Sports Center, Taizhou
15:00				Referee: Tang Shizhi

30 March 2019	Nanning Binjiang (A)	3–0	Inner Mongolia Caoshangfei (3)	Nanning Stadium, Nanning
15:30

30 March 2019	Hunan Billows (3)	2–4	Yunnan Kunlu (3)	Yiyang Stadium, Yiyang
15:30				Referee: Xiong Xing

30 March 2019	Zibo Cuju (3)	3–0	Shenyang Urban (3)	Qidu Cultural Sports City, Zibo
15:30				Referee: Cui Yueqiang

31 March 2019	Qingdao Elite United (A)	0–2	Guangxi Baoyun (3)	Jimo Powerise District Sports Center, Qingdao
14:30

31 March 2019	Xi'an Yilian (A)	1–2	Shenzhen Pengcheng (3)	Northwestern Polytechnical University Football Field, Xi'an
14:30				Referee: Li Shaobo

31 March 2019	Hubei Wuhan Athletics Zaiming (A)	6–2	Taizhou Aizhilü (A)	Huangshi Stadium, Huangshi
15:00				Referee: Li Huigang

31 March 2019	Shanghai Jiading Boji (A)	4–0	Yanbian Beiguo (3)	Jiading Stadium, Shanghai
19:30

== Third round ==
The draw for the third round took place on 3 April 2019.

16 April 2019	Nanjing Shaye (3)	0–2	Heilongjiang Lava Spring (2)	Nanjing Youth Olympic Sports Park, Nanjing
15:00				Attendance: 249; Referee: Ding Chao

16 April 2019	Liaoning F.C. (2)	1–0	Baoding Yingli ETS (3)	Tiexi New District Sports Center, Shenyang
15:30				Attendance: 581; Referee: He Xin

16 April 2019	Qingdao Huanghai (2)	2–0	Lhasa Urban Construction Investment (3)	Qingdao Guoxin Stadium, Qingdao
15:30				Attendance: 303; Referee: He Xiaochun

16 April 2019	Meizhou Hakka (2)	0–1	Jilin Baijia (3)	Huitang Stadium, Meizhou
16:00				Attendance: 1,055; Referee: Xiang Yao

16 April 2019	Zibo Cuju (3)	1–0	Sichuan Longfor (2)	Zibo Sports Center Stadium, Zibo
19:30				Attendance: 5,517; Referee: Shan Danao

16 April 2019	Nantong Zhiyun (2)	0–1	Changchun Yatai (2)	Rugao Olympic Sports Center, Nantong
19:35			Cheng Changcheng 66'	Attendance: 8,128; Referee: Kou Jianxun

17 April 2019	Hebei Aoli Jingying (3)	2–1	Guizhou Hengfeng (2)	Qinhuangdao Olympic Sports Centre Stadium, Qinhuangdao
14:30				Attendance: 313; Referee: Han Lei

17 April 2019	Qingdao Jonoon (3)	4–0	Nanning Binjiang (A)	Qingdao Tiantai Stadium, Qingdao
14:30				Attendance: 125; Referee: Xiao Nan

17 April 2019	Sichuan Jiuniu (3)	1–0	Hubei Wuhan Athletics Zaiming (A)	Nanhu Sports Center, Zigong
15:00				Attendance: 593; Referee: Du Jianxin

17 April 2019	Taizhou Yuanda (3)	5–0	Guangxi Baoyun (3)	Taixing Sports Center, Taizhou
15:00				Attendance: 1,535; Referee: Gan Shuran

17 April 2019	Shenzhen Pengcheng (3)	1–5	Beijing BSU (2)	Xixiang Sports Centre, Shenzhen
15:00				Attendance: 115; Referee: Liu Xinyu

17 April 2019	Shaanxi Chang'an Athletic (2)	1–1 (5–3 p)	Xinjiang Tianshan Leopard (2)	Weinan Sports Center Stadium, Weinan
15:30				Attendance: 10,648; Referee: Ma Li

17 April 2019	Yunnan Kunlu (3)	1–3	Shanghai Shenxin (2)	Qujing Cultural Sports Park Stadium, Qujing
15:30				Attendance: 368; Referee: Ma Yunkun

17 April 2019	Guangdong South China Tiger (2)	1–4	Zhejiang Greentown (2)	Meixian Tsang Hin-chi Stadium, Meizhou
16:00				Attendance: 3,218; Referee: Niu Minghui

17 April 2019	Shijiazhuang Ever Bright (2)	3–1	Inner Mongolia Zhongyou (2)	Hebei Olympic Sports Center, Shijiazhuang
19:30				Attendance: 4,113; Referee: Shi Zhenlu

17 April 2019	Shanghai Jiading Boji (A)	1–0	Zhejiang Yiteng (3)	Jiading Stadium, Shanghai
19:30				Attendance: 4,368; Referee: Chen Dong

== Fourth round ==
The draw for the fourth round took place on 21 April 2019.

30 April 2019	Jilin Baijia (3)	0–0 (5–4 p)	Qingdao Huanghai (2)	Development Area Stadium, Changchun
15:30	Tong Di (penalty scored); Ao Feifan (penalty scored); Mewlan Musa (penalty scored); Chen Liansheng (penalty scored); Wu Hang (penalty scored)		(penalty scored) Han Qingsong; (penalty scored) Memet-Abdulla Ezmat; (penalty scored) Yang Yu; (penalty scored) Jiang Weipeng; (penalty missed) Yu Yang	Attendance: 985; Referee: Yan Xu

30 April 2019	Liaoning F.C. (2)	0–1	Beijing Renhe (1)	Tiexi New District Sports Center, Shenyang
15:30			Liu Xinyu 7'	Attendance: 587; Referee: Shen Yinhao

30 April 2019	Shanghai Shenxin (2)	0–0 (4–2 p)	Qingdao Jonoon (3)	Jinshan Sports Centre, Shanghai
15:30	Xu Junmin (penalty scored); Cao Chuanyu (penalty scored); Zhang Yudong (penalty scored); Wang Hui (penalty scored)		(penalty scored) Pu Xianlin; (penalty scored) Zhang Huanan; (penalty missed) Liu Weicheng; (penalty missed) Peng Chengtai	Attendance: 227; Referee: Xiao Nan

30 April 2019	Tianjin TEDA (1)	4–1	Zibo Cuju (3)	Tianjin Tuanbo Football Stadium, Tianjin
18:00	Piao Taoyu 30'; Xie Weijun 45+2'; Zhang Chiming 52'; Tan Wangsong 86'		Ma Dongliang 47'	Attendance: 8,503; Referee: Chen Jindong

1 May 2019	Wuhan Zall (1)	1–3	Shanghai SIPG (1)	Dongxihu Sports Centre, Wuhan
15:00	Yan Junling 53' (o.g.)		Fu Huan 12'; Lü Wenjun 33'; Oscar 39'	Attendance: 8,172; Referee: Ma Li

1 May 2019	Changchun Yatai (2)	0–0 (5–4 p)	Sichuan Jiuniu (3)	Changchun Stadium, Changchun
15:30				Attendance: 2,268; Referee: Ding Chao
	Penalties
	Cheng Changcheng (penalty scored); Zuo Yiteng (penalty scored); Tan Tiancheng (penalty scored); Jin Chenglong (penalty scored); Zhou Dadi (penalty scored)		(penalty scored) Wang Chao; (penalty scored) Zhou Minghao; (penalty scored) Huang Zhun; (penalty scored) Shan Xialu; (penalty missed) Yu Di

1 May 2019	Shandong Luneng Taishan (1)	2–1	Zhejiang Greentown (2)	Jinan Olympic Sports Center Stadium, Jinan
15:30	Tan Yang 2'		Jin Jingdao 90+3'; Tian Xin 90+4'	Attendance: 17,469; Referee: Huang Yi

1 May 2019	Taizhou Yuanda (3)	1–0	Guangzhou R&F (1)	Taixing Sports Center, Taizhou
15:30	Xu Jiajun 48'			Attendance: 6,188; Referee: Zhang Xiaochen

1 May 2019	Heilongjiang Lava Spring (2)	0–1	Beijing Sinobo Guoan (1)	Harbin ICE Center Stadium, Harbin
15:30			Bakambu 18'	Attendance: 16,675; Referee: Kou Jianxun

1 May 2019	Shenzhen F.C. (1)	0–3; Awarded (Note: CFA awarded Shanghai Greenland Shenhua a 3–0 win as a result of Shenzhen F.C. failing to field three under-23 players in this match. The match was originally ended 0–1.)	Shanghai Greenland Shenhua (1)	Shenzhen Universiade Sports Centre, Shenzhen
17:30			Moreno 6'	Attendance: 11,362; Referee: Gu Chunhan

1 May 2019	Chongqing Dangdai Lifan (1)	1–0	Hebei China Fortune (1)	Chongqing Olympic Sports Center, Chongqing
19:00	Kardec 49'			Attendance: 6,982; Referee: Niu Minghui

1 May 2019	Dalian Yifang (1)	1–0	Shaanxi Chang'an Athletic (2)	Dalian Sports Center Stadium, Dalian
19:30	Zhu Ting 61'			Attendance: 8,769; Referee: Liang Caiwei

1 May 2019	Shanghai Jiading Boji (A)	1–0	Beijing BSU (2)	Jiading Stadium, Shanghai
19:35	Li Cheng 63'			Attendance: 4,813; Referee: Tang Shunqi

1 May 2019	Tianjin Tianhai (1)	2–2 (4–3 p)	Shijiazhuang Ever Bright (2)	Tianjin Tuanbo Football Stadium, Tianjin
19:35	Renatinho 9'; Zhang Chenglin 38'		Muriqui 12'; Liu Xinyu 73'	Attendance: 6,313; Referee: Guan Xing
	Penalties
	Liao Lisheng (penalty scored); Wang Xiaolong (penalty scored); Yao Junsheng (penalty scored); Sun Ke (penalty scored)		(penalty scored) Zhan Minwei; (penalty scored) Tan Xiang; (penalty scored) Li Chunyu; (penalty missed) Yang Yiming; (penalty missed) An Shuo

1 May 2019	Guangzhou Evergrande Taobao (1)	2–0	Henan Jianye (1)	Tianhe Stadium, Guangzhou
19:35	Gao Lin 41'; Feng Boxuan 83'			Attendance: 38,369; Referee: Shi Zhenlu

2 May 2019	Jiangsu Suning (1)	4–0	Hebei Aoli Jingying (3)	Nanjing Olympic Sports Centre, Nanjing
19:35	Ji Xiang 35'; Luo Jing 48'; Wang Song 53'; Feng Boyuan 74'			Attendance: 15,760; Referee: Ahmat Memetjan

== Fifth round ==
The draw for the fifth round took place on 2 May 2019.

28 May 2019	Tianjin Tianhai (1)	1–0	Taizhou Yuanda (3)	Tianjin Olympic Center, Tianjin
19:35	Yao Junsheng 75'			Attendance: 5,093; Referee: Shi Zhenlu

29 May 2019	Shanghai SIPG (1)	4–0	Jilin Baijia (3)	Shanghai Stadium, Shanghai
18:00	Yang Shiyuan 45+1', 71'; Li Shenglong 82'; Hu Jinghang 88'			Attendance: 17,003; Referee: Gu Chunhan

29 May 2019	Dalian Yifang (1)	2–0	Shanghai Jiading Boji (A)	Dalian Sports Center Stadium, Dalian
19:35	Zhao Xuebin 79', 83'			Attendance: 3,678; Referee: Wang Zhe

29 May 2019	Jiangsu Suning (1)	0–1	Shandong Luneng Taishan (1)	Nanjing Olympic Sports Centre, Nanjing
19:35			Pellè 81'	Attendance: 20,618; Referee: Mark Clattenburg (England)

29 May 2019	Guangzhou Evergrande Taobao (1)	5–0	Beijing Renhe (1)	Tianhe Stadium, Guangzhou
19:35	Zhang Linpeng 4'; Yang Liyu 45'; Wei Shihao 49', 61', 67'			Attendance: 19,732; Referee: Shen Yinhao

29 May 2019	Beijing Sinobo Guoan (1)	3–1	Changchun Yatai (2)	Workers' Stadium, Beijing
19:35	Yu Yang 5'; Bakambu 28'; John Hou Saeter 87'		Maurides 37'	Attendance: 22,432; Referee: Zhang Lei

29 May 2019	Shanghai Greenland Shenhua (1)	3–2 (a.e.t.)	Chongqing Dangdai Lifan (1)	Hongkou Football Stadium, Shanghai
20:00	Jiang Shenglong 30'; Romero 59'; Zhu Jianrong 109'		Peng Xinli 4'; Dong Honglin 12'	Attendance: 19,682; Referee: Milorad Mažić (Serbia)

30 May 2019	Shanghai Shenxin (2)	2–3	Tianjin TEDA (1)	Jinshan Sports Centre, Shanghai
19:30	Dibba 34'; Pan Chaoran 86'		Mao Haoyu 41'; Zhang Chiming 49'; Rong Hao 55'	Attendance: 1,319; Referee: Ma Li

== Quarter-finals ==
The draw for the quarter-finals took place on 31 May 2019.

24 July 2019	Tianjin Tianhai (1)	0–4	Dalian Yifang (1)	Haihe Educational Football Stadium, Tianjin
18:00			Boateng 26', 80', 90+1'; Sun Bo 42'	Attendance: 6,187; Referee: Ma Ning

24 July 2019	Shandong Luneng Taishan (1)	2–1 (a.e.t.)	Beijing Sinobo Guoan (1)	Jinan Olympic Sports Center Stadium, Jinan
18:00	Guedes 45+2'; Pellè 97'		Bakambu 64'	Attendance: 34,926; Referee: Milorad Mažić (Serbia)

24 July 2019	Guangzhou Evergrande Taobao (1)	0–2	Shanghai SIPG (1)	Tianhe Stadium, Guangzhou
20:00			Hulk 14'; Oscar 75'	Attendance: 48,791; Referee: Mark Clattenburg (England)

24 July 2019	Tianjin TEDA (1)	1–3	Shanghai Greenland Shenhua (1)	Tianjin Olympic Center, Tianjin
20:00	Jonathan 90+5'		Gao Di 39'; Bi Jinhao 75'; Cao Yunding 84'	Attendance: 10,451; Referee: Yusuke Araki (Japan)

== Semi-finals ==
The draw for the semi-finals took place on 24 July 2019.

19 August 2019	Dalian Yifang (1)	2–3	Shanghai Greenland Shenhua (1)	Dalian Sports Center Stadium, Dalian
19:35	Hamšík 14'; Zheng Long 84'		Shaarawy 22', 45+2'; Moreno 69'	Attendance: 50,089; Referee: Muhammad Taqi (Singapore)

20 August 2019	Shanghai SIPG (1)	0–2	Shandong Luneng Taishan (1)	Shanghai Stadium, Shanghai
19:35			Fellaini 40'; Zhang Chi 70'	Attendance: 22,593; Referee: Matthew Conger (New Zealand)

== Finals ==
=== 1st leg ===
1 November 2019
19:35 UTC+8

Shandong Luneng Taishan (1)	1–0	Shanghai Greenland Shenhua (1)
Pellè 40' (pen.)

Jinan Olympic Sports Center Stadium, Jinan
Attendance: 44,177
Referee: Milorad Mažić (Serbia)

GK	14	(China) Wang Dalei
RB	6	(China) Wang Tong (substituted off) 13'
CB	35	(China) Dai Lin
CB	5	(China) Zheng Zheng
LB	13	(China) Zhang Chi
RM	33	(China) Jin Jingdao (substituted off) 77'
CM	22	(China) Hao Junmin (c)
CM	25	(Belgium) Marouane Fellaini
LM	17	(China) Wu Xinghan
CF	9	(Italy) Graziano Pellè
CF	36	(China) Duan Liuyu (U-23) (substituted off) 67'
Substitutes:
GK	20	(China) Han Rongze
DF	16	(China) Li Hailong (U-23)
DF	18	(China) Zhou Haibin (substituted on) 67'
DF	24	(China) Qi Tianyu
DF	39	(China) Song Long (substituted on) 13'
MF	21	(China) Liu Binbin (substituted on) 77'
FW	42	(China) Song Wenjie
Manager:
(China) Li Xiaopeng

GK	27	(China) Li Shuai
RB	32	(China) Aidi Fulangxisi
CB	4	(China) Jiang Shenglong (U-23)
CB	3	(China) Bi Jinhao
CB	5	(China) Zhu Chenjie (U-23)
LB	14	(China) Sun Kai
CM	22	(Italy) Stephan El Shaarawy (substituted off) 54'
CM	25	(China) Peng Xinli
CM	28	(China) Cao Yunding
CF	10	(Colombia) Giovanni Moreno (c)
CF	20	(South Korea) Kim Shin-wook
Substitutes:
GK	12	(China) Chen Zhao (U-23)
DF	6	(China) Li Peng
DF	23	(China) Bai Jiajun
MF	7	(China) Wang Yongpo
MF	26	(China) Qian Jiegei
MF	37	(China) Sun Shilin
FW	9	(Nigeria) Odion Ighalo (substituted on) 54'
Manager:
(South Korea) Choi Kang-hee

Assistant referees:
Wang Dexin (Shenyang FA)
Song Xiangyun (Dalian FA)
Fourth official:
Shi Zhenlu (Changchun FA)
Video assistant referee:
Gu Chunhan (Wuhan FA)
Assistant video assistant referees:
Xiang Yao (Sichuan FA)

=== 2nd leg ===
6 December 2019
19:35 UTC+8

Shanghai Greenland Shenhua (1)	3–0	Shandong Luneng Taishan (1)
Kim Shin-wook 60'; Shaarawy 81'; Qian Jiegei 83'

Hongkou Football Stadium, Shanghai
Referee: Mark Clattenburg (England)

GK	27	(China) Li Shuai
RB	16	(China) Li Yunqiu
CB	3	(China) Bi Jinhao
CB	5	(China) Zhu Chenjie (U-23)
LB	23	(China) Bai Jiajun
RM	22	(Italy) Stephan El Shaarawy
CM	26	(China) Qian Jiegei
CM	25	(China) Peng Xinli (substituted off) 86'
LM	28	(China) Cao Yunding
CF	10	(Colombia) Giovanni Moreno (c)
CF	20	(South Korea) Kim Shin-wook (substituted off) 67'
Substitutes:
GK	12	(China) Chen Zhao (U-23)
DF	4	(China) Jiang Shenglong (U-23) (substituted on) 86'
DF	32	(China) Aidi Fulangxisi
MF	7	(China) Wang Yongpo
MF	8	(China) Zhang Lu
MF	18	(China) Gao Di
FW	9	(Nigeria) Odion Ighalo (substituted on) 67'
Manager:
(South Korea) Choi Kang-hee

GK	14	(China) Wang Dalei
RB	13	(China) Zhang Chi
CB	35	(China) Dai Lin
CB	5	(China) Zheng Zheng
LB	11	(China) Liu Yang
RM	33	(China) Jin Jingdao (substituted off) 85'
CM	30	(Brazil) Moisés (substituted off) 65'
CM	22	(China) Hao Junmin (c)
CM	25	(Belgium) Marouane Fellaini
LM	17	(China) Wu Xinghan (substituted off) 75'
CF	9	(Italy) Graziano Pellè
Substitutes:
GK	20	(China) Han Rongze
DF	3	(China) Liu Junshuai (substituted on) 85'
DF	6	(China) Wang Tong
DF	18	(China) Zhou Haibin
MF	21	(China) Liu Binbin
FW	23	(Brazil) Róger Guedes (substituted on) 65'
FW	36	(China) Duan Liuyu (U-23) (substituted on) 75'
Manager:
(China) Li Xiaopeng

Assistant referees:
Huo Weiming (Beijing FA)
Cao Yi (Henan FA)
Fourth official:
Ma Ning (Jiangsu FA)
Video assistant referee:
Milorad Mažić (Serbia)
Assistant video assistant referees:
Zhang Lei (Dalian FA)

== Awards ==
Dark Horse Award

- Shanghai Shenxin
- Taizhou Yuanda
- Shanghai Jiading Boji

=== Most Valuable Player of The round ===
Round	MVP	Club	Ref.
1	(China) Xu Li'ao	Zibo Cuju	
2	(China) Xu Qi	Shanghai Jiading Boji	
3	(China) Sun Yue	Shanghai Jiading Boji	
4	(China) Li Cheng	Shanghai Jiading Boji	
5	(China) Hou Yongyong	Beijing Sinobo Guoan	
QF	(Ghana) Emmanuel Boateng	Dalian Yifang	
SF	(Italy) Stephan El Shaarawy	Shanghai Greenland Shenhua	
F	(Italy) Stephan El Shaarawy	Shanghai Greenland Shenhua	
