= 2018 Chinese Champions League =

Chinese Champions League
- Season: 2018
- Champions: Taizhou Yuanda
- Promoted: Taizhou Yuanda; Chengdu Better City; Hubei Chufeng United; Hangzhou Wuyue Qiantang; Lhasa Urban Construction Investment; Nanjing Shaye; Shanxi Metropolis; Yunnan Kunlu; Wuhan Shangwen; Guangxi Baoyun; Qingdao Red Lions; Xi'an Daxing Chongde

The 2018 Chinese Football Association Member Association Champions League (Chinese: 2018中国足球协会会员协会冠军联赛), former known as Chinese Football Association Bing League (中国足球协会丙级联赛) (before 2006) and Chinese Football Association Amateur League (中国足球协会业余联赛) (2006–2017), is the fourth-tier football league of the People's Republic of China. The league is under the auspices of the Chinese Football Association.

== Promotion and relegation ==
=== From Champions League ===
Teams promoted to 2018 China League Two

- Zibo Sunday
- Anhui Hefei Guiguan
- Yanbian Beiguo
- Fujian Tianxin
- Shenzhen Pengcheng
- Sichuan Jiuniu

== Format ==
The qualification structure is as follows:

- First round (qualifying round): Chinese Football Association subordinate Provincial League and City League, champion will advance to the second round.
- Second round (regional finals): It is divided into eight groups. The top two teams of each group will advance to Third round.
- Third round (national finals): The third round is a two-legged elimination. The six winners may be qualify for the 2019 China League Two.

== First round ==
China Amateur Football League includes 44 regional leagues. 2017 or 2018 season champion will advance to the second round.

=== Teams qualified for the second round ===
Groups	No	FA	Team	Qualifying method	Position	Remark
North 1 Liaoning; Yingkou	1	Liaoning FA	Yingkou Chaoyue			Hosts
North 1 Liaoning; Yingkou	2	Liaoning FA	Dandong Hantong			
North 1 Liaoning; Yingkou	3	Liaoning FA	Anshan Dingsheng			
North 1 Liaoning; Yingkou	4	Nei Mongol FA	Tongliao Lan'ao	2017-18 Inner Mongolia FA Super League	Winners	
North 1 Liaoning; Yingkou	5	Nei Mongol FA	Hulunbuir Xinehen	2017-18 Inner Mongolia FA Super League	Fourth place	
North 1 Liaoning; Yingkou	6	Heilongjiang FA	Heilongjiang Crane City	2018 Heilongjiang FA Champions League	Winners	
North 1 Liaoning; Yingkou	7	Shenzhen FA	Shenzhen Lichang	2018 Shenzhen FA Super League	Third place	
North 2 Shanxi; Taiyuan	1	Shanxi FA	Shanxi Metropolis	2018 Shanxi FA Super League	Winners	Hosts
North 2 Shanxi; Taiyuan	2	Shanxi FA	Shanxi Zhisheng	2018 Shanxi FA Super League	Runners-up	
North 2 Shanxi; Taiyuan	3	Shanxi FA	Jinzhong Jinzhihu	2018 Shanxi FA Super League	Third place	
North 2 Shanxi; Taiyuan	4	Tianjin FA	Tianjin Ruihu	2018 Tianjin FA Super League	Runners-up	
North 2 Shanxi; Taiyuan	5	Shandong FA	Binzhou Boaijia	Qualified position of Binzhou Dongchen		
North 2 Shanxi; Taiyuan	6	Shandong FA	Weifang Juexiaoya	2017 Shandong FA Super League	Fourth place	
North 2 Shanxi; Taiyuan	7	Wuhan FA	Hubei Huachuang	2018 Wuhan FA Super League	Third place	
North 3 Shaanxi; Xi'an	1	Xi'an FA	Xi'an Daxing Chongde			
North 3 Shaanxi; Xi'an	2	Xi'an FA	Xi'an United City			Hosts
North 3 Shaanxi; Xi'an	3	Shaanxi FA	Shaanxi Nanqin			
North 3 Shaanxi; Xi'an	4	Shaanxi FA	Xi'an Huilong			
North 3 Shaanxi; Xi'an	5	Ningxia FA	Yinchuan Sanyuan	2017 Ningxia FA Super League	Winners	
North 3 Shaanxi; Xi'an	6	Fujian FA	Quanzhou Qinggong	2018 Fujian FA Super League	Runners-up	
North 3 Shaanxi; Xi'an	7	Guangxi FA	Liuzhou Ranko	2018 Guangxi FA Super League	Runners-up	
North 3 Shaanxi; Xi'an	8	Tibet FA	Lhasa Urban Construction Investment			
North 4 Jiangsu; Taizhou	1	Jiangsu FA	Taizhou Yuanda	2018 Jiangsu FA Super League	Winners	Hosts
North 4 Jiangsu; Taizhou	2	Jiangsu FA	Suzhou Zhongyuan	2018 Jiangsu FA Super League	Third place	
North 4 Jiangsu; Taizhou	3	Hebei FA	Qinhuangdao BSU	2018 Hebei FA Amateur League	Winners	
North 4 Jiangsu; Taizhou	4	Qingdao FA	Qingdao Kangtine	2018 Qingdao FA Super League	Winners	
North 4 Jiangsu; Taizhou	5	Qingdao FA	Qingdao Red Lions	2018 Qingdao FA Super League	Runners-up	
North 4 Jiangsu; Taizhou	6	Guangdong FA	Guangdong Rongyi	2017-18 Guangdong FA Football League	Winners	
North 4 Jiangsu; Taizhou	7	Sichuan FA	Sichuan Jiannanchun	2017 Sichuan FA Football League	Winners	
South 1 Jiangsu; Nanjing	1	Nanjing FA	Nanjing Shaye	2018 Nanjing FA Super League	Winners	Hosts
South 1 Jiangsu; Nanjing	2	Nanjing FA	Nanjing Balanta	2018 Nanjing FA Super League	Runners-up	
South 1 Jiangsu; Nanjing	3	Shanghai FA	Shanghai Jiading Boji	2018 Shanghai FA Super League	Winners	
South 1 Jiangsu; Nanjing	4	Zhejiang FA	Jinhua Zhongchou	2017 Zhejiang FA Super League	5th	
South 1 Jiangsu; Nanjing	5	Zhejiang FA	Hangzhou Wuyue Qiantang	2017 Zhejiang FA Super League	Winners	
South 1 Jiangsu; Nanjing	6	Jiangxi FA	Fuzhou Yincai			
South 1 Jiangsu; Nanjing	7	Fujian FA	Fuzhou Hengxing	2018 Fujian FA Super League	Winners	
South 1 Jiangsu; Nanjing	8	Xiamen FA	Xiamen Lianchuang Century	2018 Xiamen FA Amateur League	Winners	
South 2 Hubei; Wuhan	1	Wuhan FA	Wuhan Shangwen	2018 Wuhan FA Super League	Runners-up	Hosts
South 2 Hubei; Wuhan	2	Wuhan FA	Wuhan Freeman	2018 Wuhan FA Super League	Fourth place	
South 2 Hubei; Wuhan	3	Hubei FA	Hubei Chufeng United	2018 Wuhan FA Super League	Winners	
South 2 Hubei; Wuhan	4	Hubei FA	Hubei Wuhan Athletics Zaiming	2018 Hubei FA Champions League	Winners	
South 2 Hubei; Wuhan	5	Hunan FA	Changsha Sihai	2018 Hunan FA Super League	Runners-up	
South 2 Hubei; Wuhan	6	Hunan FA	Hunan HBS Mangguoba	2018 Hunan FA Super League	Winners	
South 2 Hubei; Wuhan	7	Guangzhou FA	Guangzhou Glorious	2017 Guangzhou FA Football League	Winners	
South 2 Hubei; Wuhan	8	Macau FA	MFA Development			
South 3 Sichuan; Chengdu	1	Chengdu FA	Chengdu Better City	2018 Chengdu FA Champions League	Winners	Hosts
South 3 Sichuan; Chengdu	2	Chengdu FA	Chengdu Decci	2018 Chengdu FA Super League	5th	
South 3 Sichuan; Chengdu	3	Chengdu FA	Chengdu Uniplay	2018 Chengdu FA Super League	7th	
South 3 Sichuan; Chengdu	4	Shanghai FA	Shanghai Huajiao	2018 Shanghai FA Super League	Runners-up	
South 3 Sichuan; Chengdu	5	Chongqing FA	Chongqing Dikai	2018 Chongqing FA Super League	8th	
South 3 Sichuan; Chengdu	6	Chongqing FA	Chongqing Yuanjie	Qualified position of Chongqing Junbo		
South 3 Sichuan; Chengdu	7	Guizhou FA	Zunyi HNA Huaijiu			
South 3 Sichuan; Chengdu	8	Yunnan FA	Yunnan Kunlu	2018 Yunnan FA Amateur League	Winners	
South 4 Guangdong; Huizhou	1	Guangdong FA	Huizhou Huixin	2017-18 Guangdong FA Football League	Third place	Hosts
South 4 Guangdong; Huizhou	2	Guangdong FA	Maoming Oil City	2017-18 Guangdong FA Football League	Runners-up	
South 4 Guangdong; Huizhou	3	Guangxi FA	Guangxi Baoyun	2018 Guangxi FA Super League	Winners	
South 4 Guangdong; Huizhou	4	Hainan FA	Danzhou Jiazheng	2018 Hainan FA Super League	Winners	
South 4 Guangdong; Huizhou	5	Shenzhen FA	Shenzhen Longgang Xingmeng	2018 Shenzhen FA Super League	Runners-up	
South 4 Guangdong; Huizhou	6	Shenzhen FA	Shenzhen Xinqiao	2018 Shenzhen FA Super League	Winners	

Source: fa.org.cn

== Second round ==
=== North 1 ===
==== Group A ====
Pos	Team	Pld	W	D	L	GF	GA	GD	Pts	
1	Heilongjiang Crane City (Q)	3	2	1	0	8	0	+8	7	Play-offs
2	Shenzhen Lichang (Q)	3	2	0	1	5	5	0	6	Play-offs
3	Tongliao Lan'ao	3	1	0	2	6	10	-4	3	
4	Anshan Dingsheng	3	0	1	2	2	6	-4	1	

Rules for classification: 1) Points; 2) Head-to-head points; 3) Head-to-head goal difference; 4) Head-to-head goals scored; 5) Goal difference; 6) Goals scored; 7) Disciplinary points (1 point for each yellow card, 3 points for each red card); 8) Draw

2 August 2018	Shenzhen Lichang	0–2	Heilongjiang Crane City	Yingkou Chaoyue Base Stadium, Yingkou
09:00			Zhang Bo 59'; Lü Mingqi 80'

2 August 2018	Tongliao Lan'ao	4–1	Anshan Dingsheng	Yingkou Olympic Sports Centre Stadium, Yingkou
09:00	Zhao Yong 20', 93'; Mo Lei 90'; Liu Yan 92'		Qi Genyuan 75'

3 August 2018	Heilongjiang Crane City	6–0	Tongliao Lan'ao	Yingkou Chaoyue Base Stadium, Yingkou
09:00	Lü Mingqi 20', 48'; Li Haohuan 30'; Wang Guichen 33'; Zhi Yaqi 71', 77'

3 August 2018	Anshan Dingsheng	1–2	Shenzhen Lichang	Yingkou Olympic Sports Centre Stadium, Yingkou
09:00	Niu Yulin 78'		Zhang Qun 11'; Shi Dongxian 75'

5 August 2018	Tongliao Lan'ao	2–3	Shenzhen Lichang	Yingkou Chaoyue Base Stadium, Yingkou
09:00	Zhao Yong 3', 80'		Li Guanhua 4'; Zeng Jie 14'; Liu Chaofei 50'

5 August 2018	Heilongjiang Crane City	0–0	Anshan Dingsheng	Yingkou Olympic Sports Centre Stadium, Yingkou
09:00

==== Group B ====
Pos	Team	Pld	W	D	L	GF	GA	GD	Pts	
1	Yingkou Chaoyue (Q)	2	1	1	0	3	2	+1	4	Play-offs
2	Dandong Hantong (Q)	2	0	2	0	3	3	0	2	Play-offs
3	Hulunbuir Xinehen	2	0	1	1	3	4	-1	1	

Rules for classification: 1) Points; 2) Head-to-head points; 3) Head-to-head goal difference; 4) Head-to-head goals scored; 5) Goal difference; 6) Goals scored; 7) Disciplinary points (1 point for each yellow card, 3 points for each red card); 8) Draw

2 August 2018	Dandong Hantong	1–1	Yingkou Chaoyue	Yingkou Olympic Sports Centre Stadium, Yingkou
19:40	Zhang Xiaokun 88'		Liu Shiyu 48'

3 August 2018	Hulunbuir Xinehen	2–2	Dandong Hantong	Yingkou Chaoyue Base Stadium, Yingkou
16:30	Bai Gali 4'; Bao Jinzhu 93'		Xin Enyang 16', 84'

5 August 2018	Hulunbuir Xinehen	1–2	Yingkou Chaoyue	Yingkou Olympic Sports Centre Stadium, Yingkou
16:30	Bai Gali 75'		Liang Shuai 54'; Chen Nan 86'

==== Semi-finals ====
6 August 2018	Heilongjiang Crane City	0–0 (4–3 p)	Dandong Hantong	Yingkou Olympic Sports Centre Stadium, Yingkou
09:00
	Penalties
	Zhang Bo (penalty scored); Li Zhendong (penalty scored); Zheng Lei (penalty scored); Zhang Guoshun (penalty scored)		(penalty scored) Ji Xiaofeng; (penalty scored) Zheng Bo; (penalty missed) Xin Enyang; (penalty scored) Kong Lingsi; (penalty missed) Dong Yunpeng

6 August 2018	Yingkou Chaoyue	0–0 (4–2 p)	Shenzhen Lichang	Yingkou Olympic Sports Centre Stadium, Yingkou
16:30
	Penalties
	Liang Shuai (penalty scored); Tao Junfeng (penalty scored); Liu Shiyu (penalty scored); Du Yu (penalty scored)		(penalty scored) Liu Chaofei; (penalty missed) Lin Yincheng; (penalty missed) Shi Dongxian; (penalty scored) Zeng Jie

==== Final ====
8 August 2018	Heilongjiang Crane City	0–1	Yingkou Chaoyue	Yingkou Olympic Sports Centre Stadium, Yingkou
16:30			Liu Jianzheng 85'

=== North 2 ===
==== Group A ====
Pos	Team	Pld	W	D	L	GF	GA	GD	Pts	
1	Tianjin Ruihu (Q)	3	3	0	0	6	1	+5	9	Play-offs
2	Hubei Huachuang (Q)	3	1	1	1	4	3	+1	4	Play-offs
3	Weifang Juexiaoya	3	1	1	1	2	2	0	4	
4	Shanxi Zhisheng	3	0	0	3	2	8	-6	0	

Rules for classification: 1) Points; 2) Head-to-head points; 3) Head-to-head goal difference; 4) Head-to-head goals scored; 5) Goal difference; 6) Goals scored; 7) Disciplinary points (1 point for each yellow card, 3 points for each red card); 8) Draw

3 August 2018	Tianjin Ruihu	3–0	Shanxi Zhisheng	Jinzhong City Stadium, Jinzhong
09:00	Ai Di 54'; Wu Xiaolong 70'; Zhou Qi 73' (pen.)

3 August 2018	Weifang Juexiaoya	0–0	Hubei Huachuang	Taiyuan Normal University Stadium, Taiyuan
09:00

4 August 2018	Shanxi Zhisheng	1–2	Weifang Juexiaoya	Jinzhong City Stadium, Jinzhong
09:00	Jin Yunlong 87'		Kao Yanglu 31'; Fu Zhijiang 46'

4 August 2018	Hubei Huachuang	1–2	Tianjin Ruihu	Taiyuan Normal University Stadium, Taiyuan
09:00	Ding Wenqian 20'		Xue Yan 36'; Wu Xiaolong 95'

6 August 2018	Weifang Juexiaoya	0–1	Tianjin Ruihu	Jinzhong City Stadium, Jinzhong
09:00			Wu Xiaolong 50'

6 August 2018	Shanxi Zhisheng	1–3	Hubei Huachuang	Taiyuan Normal University Stadium, Taiyuan
09:00	Xu Bo 50'		Shui Lei 64'; Pan Weiye 67'; Li Yang 71'

==== Group B ====
Pos	Team	Pld	W	D	L	GF	GA	GD	Pts	
1	Shanxi Metropolis (Q, P)	2	2	0	0	7	1	+6	6	Play-offs
2	Binzhou Boaijia (Q)	2	1	0	1	3	2	+1	3	Play-offs
3	Jinzhong Jinzhihu	2	0	0	2	0	7	-7	0	

Rules for classification: 1) Points; 2) Head-to-head points; 3) Head-to-head goal difference; 4) Head-to-head goals scored; 5) Goal difference; 6) Goals scored; 7) Disciplinary points (1 point for each yellow card, 3 points for each red card); 8) Draw

3 August 2018	Shanxi Metropolis	5–0	Jinzhong Jinzhihu	Jinzhong City Stadium, Jinzhong
16:30	Li Xiang 14', 46'; Yang Wenjie 31'; Han Deming 53', 55'

4 August 2018	Binzhou Boaijia	1–2	Shanxi Metropolis	Taiyuan Normal University Stadium, Taiyuan
16:30	Wang Hao 92'		Han Deming 30'; Yang Wenjie 83'

6 August 2018	Jinzhong Jinzhihu	0–2	Binzhou Boaijia	Taiyuan Normal University Stadium, Taiyuan
16:30			Zhang Zhaohui 57'; Geng Xin 63'

==== Semi-finals ====
7 August 2018	Tianjin Ruihu	1–1 (4–2 p)	Binzhou Boaijia	Jinzhong City Stadium, Jinzhong
09:00	Xu Meng 44'		Liang Hao 26'
	Penalties
	Xu Meng (penalty scored); Ai Di (penalty scored); Xue Yan (penalty scored); Cai Yukai (penalty scored)		(penalty scored) Hao Minhui; (penalty missed) Wu Di; (penalty scored) Liang Hao; (penalty missed) Wu Lei

7 August 2018	Shanxi Metropolis	2–0	Hubei Huachuang	Taiyuan Normal University Stadium, Taiyuan
16:30	Li Longri 38'; Liu Zhentao 61'

==== Final ====
9 August 2018	Tianjin Ruihu	0–4	Shanxi Metropolis	Jinzhong City Stadium, Jinzhong
16:30			Li Xiang 3'; Yang Wenjie 8', 58'; Lian Renjie 88' (pen.)

=== North 3 ===
==== Group A ====
Pos	Team	Pld	W	D	L	GF	GA	GD	Pts	
1	Lhasa Urban Construction Investment (Q, P)	3	3	0	0	12	0	+12	9	Play-offs
2	Xi'an Huilong (Q)	3	1	1	1	7	5	+2	4	Play-offs
3	Xi'an United City	3	1	1	1	2	1	+1	4	
4	Quanzhou Qinggong	3	0	0	3	2	17	-15	0	

Rules for classification: 1) Points; 2) Head-to-head points; 3) Head-to-head goal difference; 4) Head-to-head goals scored; 5) Goal difference; 6) Goals scored; 7) Disciplinary points (1 point for each yellow card, 3 points for each red card); 8) Draw

17 August 2018	Quanzhou Qinggong	0–8	Lhasa Urban Construction Investment	Lugang Football Park Field 1, Xi'an
09:00

17 August 2018	Xi'an Huilong	0–0	Xi'an United City	Lugang Football Park Field 2, Xi'an
09:00

18 August 2018	Lhasa Urban Construction Investment	3–0	Xi'an Huilong	Lugang Football Park Field 1, Xi'an
09:00

18 August 2018	Xi'an United City	2–0	Quanzhou Qinggong	Lugang Football Park Field 2, Xi'an
09:00

20 August 2018	Xi'an Huilong	7–2	Quanzhou Qinggong	Lugang Football Park Field 1, Xi'an
09:00

20 August 2018	Lhasa Urban Construction Investment	1–0	Xi'an United City	Lugang Football Park Field 2, Xi'an
09:00

==== Group B ====
Pos	Team	Pld	W	D	L	GF	GA	GD	Pts	
1	Xi'an Daxing Chongde (Q, P)	3	3	0	0	8	2	+6	9	Play-offs
2	Liuzhou Ranko (Q)	3	2	0	1	8	3	+5	6	Play-offs
3	Shaanxi Nanqin	3	1	0	2	4	8	-4	3	
4	Yinchuan Sanyuan	3	0	0	3	1	9	-8	0	

Rules for classification: 1) Points; 2) Head-to-head points; 3) Head-to-head goal difference; 4) Head-to-head goals scored; 5) Goal difference; 6) Goals scored; 7) Disciplinary points (1 point for each yellow card, 3 points for each red card); 8) Draw

17 August 2018	Xi'an Daxing Chongde	3–1	Shaanxi Nanqin	Lugang Football Park Field 1, Xi'an
16:30

17 August 2018	Yinchuan Sanyuan	0–4	Liuzhou Ranko	Lugang Football Park Field 2, Xi'an
16:30

18 August 2018	Shaanxi Nanqin	2–1	Yinchuan Sanyuan	Lugang Football Park Field 1, Xi'an
16:30

18 August 2018	Liuzhou Ranko	1–2	Xi'an Daxing Chongde	Lugang Football Park Field 2, Xi'an
16:30

20 August 2018	Yinchuan Sanyuan	0–3	Xi'an Daxing Chongde	Lugang Football Park Field 1, Xi'an
16:30

20 August 2018	Shaanxi Nanqin	1–3	Liuzhou Ranko	Lugang Football Park Field 2, Xi'an
16:30

==== Semi-finals ====
21 August 2018	Lhasa Urban Construction Investment	1–0	Liuzhou Ranko	Lugang Football Park Field 1, Xi'an
09:30

21 August 2018	Xi'an Daxing Chongde	1–1 (3–0 p)	Xi'an Huilong	Lugang Football Park Field 2, Xi'an
16:30

==== Final ====
23 August 2018	Lhasa Urban Construction Investment	4–1	Xi'an Daxing Chongde	Lugang Football Park Field 2, Xi'an
16:30

=== North 4 ===
==== Group A ====
Pos	Team	Pld	W	D	L	GF	GA	GD	Pts	
1	Qinhuangdao BSU (Q)	2	2	0	0	5	1	+4	6	Play-offs
2	Qingdao Kangtine (Q)	2	1	0	1	1	1	0	3	Play-offs
3	Suzhou Zhongyuan	2	0	0	2	1	5	-4	0	

Rules for classification: 1) Points; 2) Head-to-head points; 3) Head-to-head goal difference; 4) Head-to-head goals scored; 5) Goal difference; 6) Goals scored; 7) Disciplinary points (1 point for each yellow card, 3 points for each red card); 8) Draw

11 August 2018	Suzhou Zhongyuan	1–4	Qinhuangdao BSU	Taixing Sports Center Stadium, Taizhou
09:00

12 August 2018	Qinhuangdao BSU	1–0	Qingdao Kangtine	Taixing Sports Center Stadium, Taizhou
09:00

14 August 2018	Suzhou Zhongyuan	0–1	Qingdao Kangtine	Taizhou Sports Center Stadium, Taizhou
09:00

==== Group B ====
Pos	Team	Pld	W	D	L	GF	GA	GD	Pts	
1	Taizhou Yuanda (Q, C, P)	3	3	0	0	11	0	+11	9	Play-offs
2	Qingdao Red Lions (Q, P)	3	2	0	1	8	3	+5	6	Play-offs
3	Guangdong Rongyi	3	0	1	2	2	9	-7	1	
4	Sichuan Jiannanchun	3	0	1	2	3	12	-9	1	

Rules for classification: 1) Points; 2) Head-to-head points; 3) Head-to-head goal difference; 4) Head-to-head goals scored; 5) Goal difference; 6) Goals scored; 7) Disciplinary points (1 point for each yellow card, 3 points for each red card); 8) Draw

11 August 2018	Sichuan Jiannanchun	2–2	Guangdong Rongyi	Taizhou Sports Center Stadium, Taizhou
16:30

11 August 2018	Qingdao Red Lions	0–2	Taizhou Yuanda	Taixing Sports Center Stadium, Taizhou
16:30

12 August 2018	Guangdong Rongyi	0–3	Qingdao Red Lions	Taizhou Sports Center Stadium, Taizhou
16:30

12 August 2018	Taizhou Yuanda	5–0	Sichuan Jiannanchun	Taixing Sports Center Stadium, Taizhou
16:30

14 August 2018	Qingdao Red Lions	5–1	Sichuan Jiannanchun	Taizhou Sports Center Stadium, Taizhou
16:30

14 August 2018	Guangdong Rongyi	0–4	Taizhou Yuanda	Taixing Sports Center Stadium, Taizhou
16:30

==== Semi-finals ====
15 August 2018	Qinhuangdao BSU	0–2	Qingdao Red Lions	Taizhou Sports Center Stadium, Taizhou
09:00

15 August 2018	Taizhou Yuanda	4–1	Qingdao Kangtine	Taixing Sports Center Stadium, Taizhou
16:00

==== Final ====
18 August 2018	Qingdao Red Lions	1–3	Taizhou Yuanda	Taixing Sports Center Stadium, Taizhou
09:30

=== South 1 ===
==== Group A ====
Pos	Team	Pld	W	D	L	GF	GA	GD	Pts	
1	Shanghai Jiading Boji (Q)	3	2	1	0	14	2	+12	7	Play-offs
2	Nanjing Balanta (Q)	3	2	1	0	12	2	+10	7	Play-offs
3	Fuzhou Hengxing	3	1	0	2	3	8	-5	3	
4	Jinhua Zhongchou	3	0	0	3	0	17	-17	0	

Rules for classification: 1) Points; 2) Head-to-head points; 3) Head-to-head goal difference; 4) Head-to-head goals scored; 5) Goal difference; 6) Goals scored; 7) Disciplinary points (1 point for each yellow card, 3 points for each red card); 8) Draw

16 August 2018	Nanjing Balanta	8–0	Jinhua Zhongchou	Jiangning Sports Center Stadium, Nanjing
09:00

16 August 2018	Shanghai Jiading Boji	5–1	Fuzhou Hengxing	Hohai University Stadium, Nanjing
09:00

17 August 2018	Jinhua Zhongchou	0–8	Shanghai Jiading Boji	Jiangning Sports Center Stadium, Nanjing
09:00

17 August 2018	Fuzhou Hengxing	1–3	Nanjing Balanta	Hohai University Stadium, Nanjing
09:00

19 August 2018	Shanghai Jiading Boji	1–1	Nanjing Balanta	Jiangning Sports Center Stadium, Nanjing
09:00

19 August 2018	Jinhua Zhongchou	0–1	Fuzhou Hengxing	Hohai University Stadium, Nanjing
09:00

==== Group B ====
Pos	Team	Pld	W	D	L	GF	GA	GD	Pts	
1	Nanjing Shaye (Q, P)	3	2	1	0	17	0	+17	7	Play-offs
2	Hangzhou Wuyue Qiantang (Q, P)	3	2	1	0	15	2	+13	7	Play-offs
3	Xiamen Lianchuang Century	3	1	0	2	9	15	-6	3	
4	Fuzhou Yincai	3	0	0	3	0	24	-24	0	

Rules for classification: 1) Points; 2) Head-to-head points; 3) Head-to-head goal difference; 4) Head-to-head goals scored; 5) Goal difference; 6) Goals scored; 7) Disciplinary points (1 point for each yellow card, 3 points for each red card); 8) Draw

16 August 2018	Hangzhou Wuyue Qiantang	7–2	Xiamen Lianchuang Century	Jiangning Sports Center Stadium, Nanjing
16:30

16 August 2018	Fuzhou Yincai	0–9	Nanjing Shaye	Hohai University Stadium, Nanjing
16:30

18 August 2018	Xiamen Lianchuang Century	7–0	Fuzhou Yincai	Jiangning Sports Center Stadium, Nanjing
09:00

18 August 2018	Nanjing Shaye	0–0	Hangzhou Wuyue Qiantang	Jiangning Sports Center Stadium, Nanjing
11:00

19 August 2018	Fuzhou Yincai	0–8	Hangzhou Wuyue Qiantang	Jiangning Sports Center Stadium, Nanjing
16:30

19 August 2018	Xiamen Lianchuang Century	0–8	Nanjing Shaye	Hohai University Stadium, Nanjing
16:30

==== Semi-finals ====
20 August 2018	Shanghai Jiading Boji	0–1	Hangzhou Wuyue Qiantang	Jiangning Sports Center Stadium, Nanjing
16:30

20 August 2018	Nanjing Shaye	3–0	Nanjing Balanta	Hohai University Stadium, Nanjing
16:30

==== Final ====
22 August 2018	Hangzhou Wuyue Qiantang	0–1	Nanjing Shaye	Jiangning Sports Center Stadium, Nanjing
16:30

=== South 2 ===
==== Group A ====
Pos	Team	Pld	W	D	L	GF	GA	GD	Pts	
1	Hubei Chufeng United (Q, P)	3	2	1	0	7	1	+6	7	Play-offs
2	MFA Development (Q)	3	1	1	1	6	8	-2	4^{1}	Play-offs
3	Hunan HBS Mangguoba	3	1	1	1	4	5	-1	4^{1}	
4	Wuhan Freeman	3	0	1	2	6	9	-3	1	

- ^1 Head-to-head points: MFA Development 3, Hunan HBS Mangguoba 0.

Rules for classification: 1) Points; 2) Head-to-head points; 3) Head-to-head goal difference; 4) Head-to-head goals scored; 5) Goal difference; 6) Goals scored; 7) Disciplinary points (1 point for each yellow card, 3 points for each red card); 8) Draw

10 August 2018	MFA Development	3–1	Hunan HBS Mangguoba	Tazi Lake Sports Centre Field 1, Wuhan
17:30

10 August 2018	Wuhan Freeman	1–3	Hubei Chufeng United	Tazi Lake Sports Centre Field 3, Wuhan
17:30

11 August 2018	Hunan HBS Mangguoba	3–2	Wuhan Freeman	Tazi Lake Sports Centre Field 1, Wuhan
17:30

11 August 2018	Hubei Chufeng United	4–0	MFA Development	Tazi Lake Sports Centre Field 3, Wuhan
17:30

13 August 2018	Wuhan Freeman	3–3	MFA Development	Tazi Lake Sports Centre Field 1, Wuhan
17:30

13 August 2018	Hunan HBS Mangguoba	0–0	Hubei Chufeng United	Tazi Lake Sports Centre Field 3, Wuhan
17:30

==== Group B ====
Pos	Team	Pld	W	D	L	GF	GA	GD	Pts	
1	Wuhan Shangwen (Q, P)	3	3	0	0	11	4	+7	9	Play-offs
2	Hubei Wuhan Athletics Zaiming (Q)	3	1	1	1	5	4	+1	4	Play-offs
3	Guangzhou Glorious	3	1	1	1	4	4	0	4	
4	Changsha Sihai	3	0	0	3	3	11	-8	0	

Rules for classification: 1) Points; 2) Head-to-head points; 3) Head-to-head goal difference; 4) Head-to-head goals scored; 5) Goal difference; 6) Goals scored; 7) Disciplinary points (1 point for each yellow card, 3 points for each red card); 8) Draw

10 August 2018	Changsha Sihai	1–2	Guangzhou Glorious	Tazi Lake Sports Centre Field 1, Wuhan
20:00

10 August 2018	Hubei Wuhan Athletics Zaiming	1–3	Wuhan Shangwen	Tazi Lake Sports Centre Field 3, Wuhan
20:00

11 August 2018	Guangzhou Glorious	0–0	Hubei Wuhan Athletics Zaiming	Tazi Lake Sports Centre Field 1, Wuhan
20:00

11 August 2018	Wuhan Shangwen	5–1	Changsha Sihai	Tazi Lake Sports Centre Field 3, Wuhan
20:00

13 August 2018	Hubei Wuhan Athletics Zaiming	4–1	Changsha Sihai	Tazi Lake Sports Centre Field 1, Wuhan
20:00

13 August 2018	Guangzhou Glorious	2–3	Wuhan Shangwen	Tazi Lake Sports Centre Field 3, Wuhan
20:00

==== Semi-finals ====
14 August 2018	Hubei Chufeng United	3–0	Hubei Wuhan Athletics Zaiming	Tazi Lake Sports Centre Field 1, Wuhan
17:30

14 August 2018	Wuhan Shangwen	2–0	MFA Development	Tazi Lake Sports Centre Field 3, Wuhan
20:00

==== Final ====
16 August 2018	Hubei Chufeng United	2–0	Wuhan Shangwen	Tazi Lake Sports Centre Field 3, Wuhan
17:30

=== South 3 ===
==== Group A ====
Pos	Team	Pld	W	D	L	GF	GA	GD	Pts	
1	Yunnan Kunlu (Q, P)	3	3	0	0	15	0	+15	9	Play-offs
2	Chengdu Decci (Q)	3	1	1	1	6	8	-2	4	Play-offs
3	Zunyi HNA Huaijiu	3	1	0	2	6	11	-5	3	
4	Chongqing Dikai	3	0	1	2	3	10	-7	1	

Rules for classification: 1) Points; 2) Head-to-head points; 3) Head-to-head goal difference; 4) Head-to-head goals scored; 5) Goal difference; 6) Goals scored; 7) Disciplinary points (1 point for each yellow card, 3 points for each red card); 8) Draw

25 August 2018	Chengdu Decci	1–1	Chongqing Dikai	Wenjiang Football Base Field 1, Chengdu
09:00

25 August 2018	Zunyi HNA Huaijiu	0–4	Yunnan Kunlu	Wenjiang Football Base Field 2, Chengdu
09:00

26 August 2018	Chongqing Dikai	2–4	Zunyi HNA Huaijiu	Wenjiang Football Base Field 1, Chengdu
09:00

26 August 2018	Yunnan Kunlu	6–0	Chengdu Decci	Wenjiang Football Base Field 2, Chengdu
09:00

28 August 2018	Zunyi HNA Huaijiu	2–5	Chengdu Decci	Wenjiang Football Base Field 1, Chengdu
09:00

28 August 2018	Chongqing Dikai	0–5	Yunnan Kunlu	Wenjiang Football Base Field 2, Chengdu
09:00

==== Group B ====
Pos	Team	Pld	W	D	L	GF	GA	GD	Pts	
1	Chengdu Better City (Q, P)	3	3	0	0	26	2	+24	9	Play-offs
2	Shanghai Huajiao (Q)	3	1	1	1	7	8	-1	4	Play-offs
3	Chengdu Uniplay	3	1	1	1	5	10	-5	4	
4	Chongqing Yuanjie	3	0	0	3	3	21	-18	0	

Rules for classification: 1) Points; 2) Head-to-head points; 3) Head-to-head goal difference; 4) Head-to-head goals scored; 5) Goal difference; 6) Goals scored; 7) Disciplinary points (1 point for each yellow card, 3 points for each red card); 8) Draw

25 August 2018	Shanghai Huajiao	4–0	Chongqing Yuanjie	Wenjiang Football Base Field 1, Chengdu
16:30

25 August 2018	Chengdu Uniplay	0–6	Chengdu Better City	Wenjiang Football Base Field 2, Chengdu
16:30

26 August 2018	Chongqing Yuanjie	3–4	Chengdu Uniplay	Wenjiang Football Base Field 1, Chengdu
16:30

26 August 2018	Chengdu Better City	7–2	Shanghai Huajiao	Wenjiang Football Base Field 2, Chengdu
16:30

28 August 2018	Chengdu Uniplay	1–1	Shanghai Huajiao	Wenjiang Football Base Field 1, Chengdu
16:30

28 August 2018	Chongqing Yuanjie	0–13	Chengdu Better City	Wenjiang Football Base Field 2, Chengdu
16:30

==== Semi-finals ====
29 August 2018	Yunnan Kunlu	2–1	Shanghai Huajiao	Wenjiang Football Base Field 1, Chengdu
16:30

29 August 2018	Chengdu Better City	9–1	Chengdu Decci	Wenjiang Football Base Field 2, Chengdu
16:30

==== Final ====
31 August 2018	Yunnan Kunlu	0–4	Chengdu Better City	Wenjiang Football Base Field 3, Chengdu
15:30

=== South 4 ===
Pos	Team	Pld	W	D	L	GF	GA	GD	Pts	
1	Shenzhen Xinqiao (Q)	5	3	2	0	26	2	+24	11	Third round
2	Guangxi Baoyun (Q, P)	5	3	2	0	17	3	+14	11	Third round
3	Shenzhen Longgang Xingmeng	5	3	2	0	9	2	+7	11	
4	Huizhou Huixin	5	1	1	3	19	13	+6	4	
5	Maoming Oil City	5	1	1	3	5	11	-6	4	
6	Danzhou Jiazheng	5	0	0	5	1	46	-45	0	

Rules for classification: 1) Points; 2) Head-to-head points; 3) Head-to-head goal difference; 4) Head-to-head goals scored; 5) Goal difference; 6) Goals scored; 7) Disciplinary points (1 point for each yellow card, 3 points for each red card); 8) Draw

24 August 2018	Danzhou Jiazheng	0–5	Guangxi Baoyun	Huizhou Olympic Stadium, Huizhou
09:00

24 August 2018	Shenzhen Longgang Xingmeng	0–0	Shenzhen Xinqiao	Huizhou Olympic Stadium Outer Field, Huizhou
09:00

24 August 2018	Maoming Oil City	1–1	Huizhou Huixin	Huizhou Olympic Stadium, Huizhou
16:30

25 August 2018	Shenzhen Xinqiao	17–0	Danzhou Jiazheng	Huizhou Olympic Stadium, Huizhou
09:00

25 August 2018	Maoming Oil City	0–2	Shenzhen Longgang Xingmeng	Huizhou Olympic Stadium Outer Field, Huizhou
16:30

25 August 2018	Guangxi Baoyun	5–0	Huizhou Huixin	Huizhou Olympic Stadium, Huizhou
16:30

27 August 2018	Shenzhen Xinqiao	3–0	Maoming Oil City	Huizhou Olympic Stadium, Huizhou
09:00

27 August 2018	Shenzhen Longgang Xingmeng	0–0	Guangxi Baoyun	Huizhou Olympic Stadium Outer Field, Huizhou
09:00

27 August 2018	Huizhou Huixin	17–0	Danzhou Jiazheng	Huizhou Olympic Stadium, Huizhou
16:30

28 August 2018	Guangxi Baoyun	2–2	Shenzhen Xinqiao	Huizhou Olympic Stadium, Huizhou
09:00

28 August 2018	Huizhou Huixin	1–3	Shenzhen Longgang Xingmeng	Huizhou Olympic Stadium Outer Field, Huizhou
16:30

28 August 2018	Danzhou Jiazheng	0–3	Maoming Oil City	Huizhou Olympic Stadium, Huizhou
16:30

30 August 2018	Huizhou Huixin	0–4	Shenzhen Xinqiao	Huizhou Olympic Stadium, Huizhou
09：30

30 August 2018	Maoming Oil City	1–5	Guangxi Baoyun	Huizhou Olympic Stadium Outer Field, Huizhou
09：30

30 August 2018	Danzhou Jiazheng	1–4	Shenzhen Longgang Xingmeng	Huizhou Olympic Stadium, Huizhou
15：30

== Third round ==
=== Qualified teams ===
Groups	Club	Head coach	City	Stadium	Capacity	Position
North	Yingkou Chaoyue	(China) Ma Kai	Yingkou	Yingkou Olympic Sports Centre Stadium	35,000	North1, 1st
North	Heilongjiang Crane City	(Germany) Thomas Vasov	Qiqihar (playing in Harbin)	Harbin ICE Sports Center	50,000	North1, 2nd
North	Shanxi Metropolis	(China) Huang Hongyi	Taiyuan	Shanxi Sports Centre Stadium	62,000	North2, 1st
North	Tianjin Ruihu	(China) Bian Hongbin	Tianjin	Tianjin Tuanbo Football Stadium	22,320	North2, 2nd
North	Lhasa Urban Construction Investment	(China) Zhang Biao	Lhasa (playing in Nyingchi)	Nyingchi City Stadium	N/A	North3, 1st
North	Xi'an Daxing Chongde	(China) Gao Xuehua	Xi'an	Northwestern Polytechnical University Stadium	N/A	North3, 2nd
North	Taizhou Yuanda	(China) Yin Tiesheng	Taizhou	Taixing Sports Center Stadium	8,000	North4, 1st
North	Qingdao Red Lions	(China) Guo Zuojin	Qingdao	Jimo City Stadium	5,000	North4, 2nd
South	Nanjing Shaye	(China) Tang Bo	Nanjing	Hohai University Stadium	5,000	South1, 1st
South	Hangzhou Wuyue Qiantang	(China) Gu Zhongqing	Hangzhou	Hangzhou Sports Center Stadium	15,000	South1, 2nd
South	Hubei Chufeng United	(China) Huang Zhengguo	Wuhan	Xinhua Road Sports Center	22,140	South2, 1st
South	Wuhan Shangwen	(China) Zeng Qinggao	Wuhan	Tazi Lake Sports Centre	N/A	South2, 2nd
South	Chengdu Better City	(Spain) José Carlos Granero	Chengdu	Chengdu Longquanyi Football Stadium	42,000	South3, 1st
South	Yunnan Kunlu	(Croatia) Goran Miscevic	Kunming	Hongta Sports Center	N/A	South3, 2nd
South	Shenzhen Xinqiao	(China) Huang Yi	Shenzhen	Xixiang Sports Center Stadium	N/A	South4, 1st
South	Guangxi Baoyun	(China) Han Zhenyuan	Liuzhou	Rongshui Sports Park Stadium	N/A	South4, 2nd

=== Clubs Locations ===
Location of teams in 2018 Chinese Champions League R16

=== Round of 16 ===
North
Team 1	Agg.	Team 2	1st leg	2nd leg
Xi'an Daxing Chongde	0–5	Shanxi Metropolis	0–2	0–3
Tianjin Ruihu	3–3 (4–1 p)	Yingkou Chaoyue	2–1	1–2
Heilongjiang Crane City	0–2	Taizhou Yuanda	0–0	0–2
Qingdao Red Lions	1–3	Lhasa Urban Construction Investment	0–1	1–2

South
Team 1	Agg.	Team 2	1st leg	2nd leg
Guangxi Baoyun	1–4	Chengdu Better City	0–0	1–4
Wuhan Shangwen	0–1	Nanjing Shaye	0–0	0–1
Yunnan Kunlu	1–2	Hubei Chufeng United	1–0	0–2
Hangzhou Wuyue Qiantang	3–1	Shenzhen Xinqiao	1–0	2–1

8 September 2018
14:30

Xi'an Daxing Chongde	0–2	Shanxi Metropolis
		Qi Dan 7'; Han Deming 54'

Northwestern Polytechnical University Stadium, Xi'an
Referee: Chen Gang
22 September 2018
14:30

Shanxi Metropolis	3–0	Xi'an Daxing Chongde
Lü Yongdi 42'; Lian Renjie 71'; Qi Dan 75'

Shanxi Sports Centre Stadium, Taiyuan
Referee: Gu Zhongchao

9 September 2018
14:00

Tianjin Ruihu	2–1	Yingkou Chaoyue
Han Yongle 50', 71'		Liang Shuai 35'

Tianjin Tuanbo Football Stadium, Tianjin
22 September 2018
15:30

Yingkou Chaoyue	2–1	Tianjin Ruihu
Liu Jinxu 28', 39' (pen.)		Dong Zhen 29' (o.g.)
Penalties
	1–4

Yingkou Olympic Sports Centre Stadium, Yingkou
Referee: Zhu Di

9 September 2018
14:30

Heilongjiang Crane City	0–0	Taizhou Yuanda

Harbin ICE Sports Center, Harbin
23 September 2018
14:30

Taizhou Yuanda	2–0	Heilongjiang Crane City
Wen Chao 39'; Gao Xinyu 90+3'

Taixing Sports Center Stadium, Taizhou
Referee: Liang Caiwei

9 September 2018
16:30

Qingdao Red Lions	0–1	Lhasa Urban Construction Investment
		Sun Fei 90+1'

Jimo City Stadium, Qingdao
23 September 2018
16:30

Lhasa Urban Construction Investment	2–1	Qingdao Red Lions
Sun Fei 79', 90+2'		Tang Chuang 45+1'

Nyingchi City Stadium, Nyingchi
Referee: Ding Chao

15 September 2018
14:30

Guangxi Baoyun	0–0	Chengdu Better City

Rongshui Sports Park Stadium, Liuzhou
1 October 2018
15:30

Chengdu Better City	4–1	Guangxi Baoyun
Cao Tianbao 23', 29', 73'; Huang Chao 41'		Shi Xuefeng 18'

Chengdu Longquanyi Football Stadium, Chengdu
Referee: Zhu Wenbin

16 September 2018
19:30

Wuhan Shangwen	0–0	Nanjing Shaye

Tazi Lake Sports Centre Field 3, Wuhan
1 October 2018
15:30

Nanjing Shaye	1–0	Wuhan Shangwen
Yuan Zheng 84'

Hohai University Stadium, Nanjing
Referee: Wang Zhe

16 September 2018
16:00

Yunnan Kunlu	1–0	Hubei Chufeng United
Zhang Yu 28' (pen.)

Hongta Sports Center Field 4, Kunming
1 October 2018
15:30

Hubei Chufeng United	2–0	Yunnan Kunlu
Sun Ningzhe 41'; Qi Chongxi 67' (pen.)

Xinhua Road Sports Center, Wuhan
Referee: Xu Qiangqiang

16 September 2018
14:30

Hangzhou Wuyue Qiantang	1–0	Shenzhen Xinqiao
Wang Yang 79'

Hangzhou Sports Center Stadium, Hangzhou
1 October 2018
15:30

Shenzhen Xinqiao	1–2	Hangzhou Wuyue Qiantang
Xia Dalong 90'		Mou Yimin 22'; Liu Songwei 62' (o.g.)

Xixiang Sports Center Stadium, Shenzhen
Referee: Wu Liying

=== Quarter-finals ===
Team 1	Agg.	Team 2	1st leg	2nd leg
Hangzhou Wuyue Qiantang	3–2	Shanxi Metropolis	2–1	1–1
Lhasa Urban Construction Investment	1–7	Chengdu Better City	1–1	0–6
Nanjing Shaye	2–4	Taizhou Yuanda	2–2	0–2
Tianjin Ruihu	2–6	Hubei Chufeng United	0–3	2–3

6 October 2018
14:00

Hangzhou Wuyue Qiantang	2–1	Shanxi Metropolis
Gu Xiaowei 10', 20'		Wang Yuxing 54'

Hangzhou Sports Center Stadium, Hangzhou
Referee: Niu Minghui
13 October 2018
14:00

Shanxi Metropolis	1–1	Hangzhou Wuyue Qiantang
Li Gang 89'		Wang Sichao 14'

Shanxi Sports Centre Stadium, Taiyuan

6 October 2018
15:00

Lhasa Urban Construction Investment	1–1	Chengdu Better City
Cao Hanzhi 39'		Gan Rui 66' (pen.)

Nyingchi City Stadium, Nyingchi
Referee: Liu Xinyu
14 October 2018
15:30

Chengdu Better City	6–0	Lhasa Urban Construction Investment
Ma Xiaolei 11', 34'; Hu Mingtian 23'; Huang Chao 47', 67'; Gan Rui 73' (pen.)

Chengdu Longquanyi Football Stadium, Chengdu

7 October 2018
14:00

Nanjing Shaye	2–2	Taizhou Yuanda
Tian Rui 27'; Wang Zhenlong 90+3'		Niu Xiucheng 51'; Chen Long 66'

Hohai University Stadium, Nanjing
14 October 2018
14:00

Taizhou Yuanda	2–0	Nanjing Shaye
Wen Chao 11'; Gao Teng 83'

Taixing Sports Center Stadium, Taizhou

13 October 2018
15:30

Tianjin Ruihu	0–3	Hubei Chufeng United
		Guo Yuantong 26'; Zhu Cheng 54'; Huang Junyi 85'

Xinhua Road Sports Center, Wuhan
14 October 2018
15:30

Hubei Chufeng United	3–2	Tianjin Ruihu
Li Xinyu 29'; Yan Qi 41'; Deng Sheng 59'		Xu Meng 88'; Han Yongle 90+2'

Xinhua Road Sports Center, Wuhan

=== 5th–8th-place semifinals ===
21 October 2018
14:00

Shanxi Metropolis	1–2	Lhasa Urban Construction Investment
Yang Wenjie 81'		Liu Zijun 38'; Huang Haoxuan 65'

Shanxi Sports Centre Stadium, Taiyuan
21 October 2018
14:00

Nanjing Shaye	4–0	Tianjin Ruihu
Jiang Zhimo 56'; Zhang Tao 57', 66'; Lin Shaoyun 90'

Hohai University Stadium, Nanjing

=== 7th–8th place ===
28 October 2018
14:00

Shanxi Metropolis	5–3	Tianjin Ruihu
Xu Ziteng 20', 38', 40' (pen.); Bai Fan 51'; Liu Zhentao 65'		Xu Meng 32' (pen.); Han Yongle 59', 61'

Shanxi Sports Centre Stadium, Taiyuan

=== 5th–6th place ===
28 October 2018
16:00

Lhasa Urban Construction Investment	1–0	Nanjing Shaye
Fei Da 90'

Nyingchi City Stadium, Nyingchi

=== Semi-finals ===
Team 1	Agg.	Team 2	1st leg	2nd leg
Chengdu Better City	5–1	Hangzhou Wuyue Qiantang	3–0	2–1
Hubei Chufeng United	1–2	Taizhou Yuanda	0–0	1–2

20 October 2018
15:30

Chengdu Better City	3–0	Hangzhou Wuyue Qiantang
Hu Mingtian 15'; Gan Rui 43' (pen.); Cheng Zuhao 71'

Chengdu Longquanyi Football Stadium, Chengdu
27 October 2018
15:00

Hangzhou Wuyue Qiantang	1–2	Chengdu Better City
Wang Yang 47'		Ma Xiaolei 87'; Huang Chao 88'

Hangzhou Sports Center Stadium, Hangzhou

20 October 2018
15:00

Hubei Chufeng United	0–0	Taizhou Yuanda

Xinhua Road Sports Center, Wuhan
30 October 2018
14:00

Taizhou Yuanda	2–1	Hubei Chufeng United
Wen Chao 57'; Zhao Xinlei 68'		Huang Junyi 7'

Taixing Sports Center Stadium, Taizhou

=== Third-Place Match ===
6 November 2018
14:00

Hangzhou Wuyue Qiantang	3–3	Hubei Chufeng United
Mou Yimin 17'; Chen Minghao 72'; Wang Yang 78'		Huang Junyi 5', 51'; Lu Lei 68'
Penalties
	2–4

Hangzhou Sports Center Stadium, Hangzhou

=== Final match ===
Team 1	Agg.	Team 2	1st leg	2nd leg
Taizhou Yuanda	4–2	Chengdu Better City	4–1	0–1

4 November 2018
14:00

Taizhou Yuanda	4–1	Chengdu Better City
Wen Chao 17'; Liu Junpeng 21'; Gao Jiulong 28' (o.g.); Chen Zheng 79'		Cao Tianbao 31'

Taixing Sports Center Stadium, Taizhou
11 November 2018
14:00

Chengdu Better City	1–0	Taizhou Yuanda
Cao Tianbao 43'

Chengdu Longquanyi Football Stadium, Chengdu

== Awards ==
The awards of 2018 Chinese Champions League were announced on 8 December 2018.

Award	Winner	Club
Player of the Season	(China) Wen Chao	Taizhou Yuanda
Golden Boot	(China) Cao Tianbao	Chengdu Better City
Goalkeeper of the Season	(China) Dong Lei	Taizhou Yuanda
Young Player of the Season	(China) Yang Risheng	Hangzhou Wuyue Qiantang
Manager of the Season	(China) Yin Tiesheng	Taizhou Yuanda
Goal of the Season	(China) Qi Dan	Shanxi Metropolis
Most Popular Player	(China) Zhao Xinlei	Taizhou Yuanda

Team of the Year
Goalkeeper	(China) Dong Lei (Taizhou Yuanda)			
Defender	(China) Gan Rui (Chengdu Better City)		(China) Dai Junjie (Lhasa Urban Construction Investment)	(China) Qi Dan (Shanxi Metropolis)
Midfielder	(China) Wang Yang (Hangzhou Wuyue Qiantang)	(China) Yan Xiao (Nanjing Shaye)	(China) Liu Jinxu (Yingkou Chaoyue)	(China) Qi Chongxi (Hubei Chufeng United)
Forward	(China) Wen Chao (Taizhou Yuanda)		(China) Cao Tianbao (Chengdu Better City)	(China) Yang Zengqi (Yunnan Kunlu)
