= Qingdao Liming F.C. =

Chinese football club

Qingdao Liming 青岛黎明
- Full name: Qingdao Liming FC 青岛黎明足球俱乐部
- Founded: 1998; 27 years ago
- Ground: Jimo City Stadium, Jimo, Shandong, China
- Capacity: 5,000
- 2007: 8th, Northern Group
Home colours	Away colours

Qingdao Liming (Chinese: 青岛黎明) is a semi-professional football club based in Jimo, a district of Qingdao. The club was founded in 1998, and had played in the Chinese Yi League, but was absent in the 2008 season.

Club constructed their 200-acre (0.81 km^{2}) grass training field on the east side of Jimo, Shandong gongquan reservoir in 2000.
