= Han Deming =

Chinese footballer

Han Deming 韩德明
Personal information
- Date of birth: July 22, 1986 (age 40)
- Place of birth: Dalian, Liaoning, China
- Height: 1.72 m (5 ft 8 in)
- Position: Midfielder

Senior career*
Years	Team	Apps	(Gls)
2004–2005	Shaanxi National Power	13	(2)
2006–2007	Shanxi Wosen Luhu	30	(4)
2008–2014	Harbin Yiteng	87	(14)
2015–2018	Changchun Yatai	38	(1)
2017	→ Shaanxi Chang'an Athletic (loan)	13	(1)
2018	Shanxi Metropolis	–	(–)
- * Club domestic league appearances and goals as of 31 December 2020

Han Deming (Chinese: 韩德明; born 22 July 1986) is a retired Chinese football player.

== Club career ==
In 2004, Han Deming started his professional footballer career with Shaanxi National Power in the China League One. In February 2006, Han transferred to newly promoted China League One side Shanxi Wosen Luhu. For the next two seasons he would go on to establish himself as a vital member of their squad, however the club were in financial difficulties and dissolved at the end of the 2007 league season.

In March 2008, Han transferred to China League One side Harbin Yiteng. In his debut season with the club he would unfortunately see them relegated at the end of the 2008 China League One campaign. In the 2011 China League Two campaign he would be part of the team that won the division and promotion into the second tier. He would go on to be a member of the squad as they moved up divisions and gained promotion to the Chinese Super League. He made his Super League debut on 15 March 2014 in a 4–1 away defeat against Guangzhou Evergrande and he also scored his first Super League goal in this match.

Han transferred to another Super League club Changchun Yatai along with his teammate Shao Shuai in December 2014. In July 2017, Han was loaned to China League Two club Shaanxi Chang'an Athletic until 31 December 2017.

== Career statistics ==
Statistics accurate as of match played 31 December 2020.

Appearances and goals by club, season and competition
Club	Season	League			National Cup		Continental		Other		Total	
Club	Season	Division	Apps	Goals	Apps	Goals	Apps	Goals	Apps	Goals	Apps	Goals
Shaanxi National Power	2004	China League One	13	2	0	0	-		-		13	2
Shaanxi National Power	2005	China League One	0	0	0	0	-		-		0	0
Shaanxi National Power	Total		13	2	0	0	0	0	0	0	13	2
Shanxi Wosen Luhu	2006	China League One	20	2	0	0	-		-		20	2
Shanxi Wosen Luhu	2007	China League One	10	2	-		-		-		10	2
Shanxi Wosen Luhu	Total		30	4	0	0	0	0	0	0	30	4
Harbin Yiteng	2008	China League One	8	1	-		-		-		8	1
Harbin Yiteng	2009	China League Two			-		-		-			
Harbin Yiteng	2010	China League Two			-		-		-			
Harbin Yiteng	2011	China League Two	19	3	0	0	-		-		19	3
Harbin Yiteng	2012	China League One	17	0	1	0	-		-		18	0
Harbin Yiteng	2013	China League One	25	4	2	0	-		-		27	4
Harbin Yiteng	2014	Chinese Super League	18	6	1	0	-		-		19	6
Harbin Yiteng	Total		87	14	4	0	0	0	0	0	91	14
Changchun Yatai	2015	Chinese Super League	25	1	0	0	-		-		25	1
Changchun Yatai	2016	Chinese Super League	11	0	0	0	-		-		11	0
Changchun Yatai	2017	Chinese Super League	2	0	1	0	-		-		3	0
Changchun Yatai	Total		38	1	1	0	0	0	0	0	39	1
Shaanxi Chang'an Athletic (loan)	2017	China League Two	13	1	0	0	-		-		13	1
Shanxi Metropolis	2018	CMCL	-		-		-		-		0	0
Career total			181	22	5	0	0	0	0	0	186	22

== Honours ==
=== Club ===
Harbin Yiteng

- China League Two: 2011
