= Lü Yongdi =

Chinese footballer

Lü Yongdi 吕永帝
Personal information
- Date of birth: December 16, 1993 (age 32)
- Place of birth: Dalian, Liaoning, China
- Height: 1.75 m (5 ft 9 in)
- Position: Midfielder

Team information
- Current team: Xi'an UKD
- Number: 17

Senior career*
Years	Team	Apps	(Gls)
2010–2018	Harbin Yiteng	36	(1)
2017	→ Jilin Baijia (loan)	11	(0)
2018	Shanxi Metropolis	–	(–)
2019–	Xi'an UKD	8	(0)
- * Club domestic league appearances and goals as of 31 December 2020

Lü Yongdi (Chinese: 吕永帝; born 16 December 1993) is a Chinese football player.

== Club career ==
In 2010, Lü Yongdi started his professional football career with Harbin Yiteng in the China League Two. In the 2011 China League Two campaign he would be part of the team that won the division and promotion into the second tier. He would go on to be a member of the squad as they moved up divisions and gained promotion to the Chinese Super League. He would eventually make his Super league debut for Harbin on 7 March 2014 in a game against Shandong Luneng Taishan, coming on as a substitute for Li Jiahe in the 46th minute.

In July 2017, Lü was loaned to China League Two club Jilin Baijia until 31 December 2017.

After the relegation of Yiteng in 2018, Lü was transferred to Shanxi Metropolis and to Xi'an UKD in 2019.

== Career statistics ==
Statistics accurate as of match played 31 December 2020.

Appearances and goals by club, season and competition
Club	Season	League			National Cup		Continental		Other		Total	
Club	Season	Division	Apps	Goals	Apps	Goals	Apps	Goals	Apps	Goals	Apps	Goals
Harbin Yiteng	2010	China League Two	0	0	-		-		-		0	0
Harbin Yiteng	2011	China League Two	6	0	-		-		-		6	0
Harbin Yiteng	2012	China League One	8	1	0	0	-		-		8	1
Harbin Yiteng	2013	China League One	3	0	0	0	-		-		3	0
Harbin Yiteng	2014	Chinese Super League	5	0	0	0	-		-		5	0
Harbin Yiteng	2015	China League One	3	0	1	0	-		-		4	0
Harbin Yiteng	2016	China League One	8	0	1	0	-		-		9	0
Harbin Yiteng	2017	China League One	3	0	1	0	-		-		4	0
Harbin Yiteng	Total		36	1	3	0	0	0	0	0	39	1
Jilin Baijia (loan)	2017	China League Two	11	0	0	0	-		-		11	0
Shanxi Metropolis	2018	CMCL	-		-		-		-		0	0
Xi'an UKD	2019	CMCL	-		-		-		-		0	0
Xi'an UKD	2020	China League Two	8	0	-		-		-		8	0
Xi'an UKD	Total		8	0	0	0	0	0	0	0	8	0
Career total			55	1	3	0	0	0	0	0	58	1

== Honours ==
=== Club ===
Harbin Yiteng

- China League Two: 2011
