= Wen Chao =

Chinese footballer (born 1987)

Wen Chao 文超
Personal information
- Date of birth: 16 January 1987 (age 39)
- Place of birth: Shenyang, Liaoning, China
- Height: 1.82 m (5 ft 11 1/2 in)
- Position: Forward

Team information
- Current team: Shenzhen Juniors (assistant coach)

Youth career
- Changsha Ginde

Senior career*
Years	Team	Apps	(Gls)
2007–2015	Guangzhou R&F	24	(4)
2008	→ Hunan Billows (loan)		
2014	→ Yinchuan Helanshan (loan)	5	(3)
2016–2017	Baoding Yingli ETS	26	(1)
2018–2020	Taizhou Yuanda	38	(12)
2021	Xiamen Egret Island	20	(5)
2022–2023	Dalian LFTZ Huayi		

Managerial career
- 2025–: Shenzhen Juniors (assistant)
- * Club domestic league appearances and goals as of 20 May 2022

Wen Chao (Chinese: 文超; pinyin: Wén Chāo; born 16 January 1987) is a Chinese football coach and former football player.

== Club career ==
Wen joined Changsha Ginde youth team system in the early year and was promoted to first team squad in 2007. He was loaned to China League Two side Hunan Billows for gaining match experiences in the 2008 league season. When he returned to Changsha Ginde in 2009, Wen began to have a change to play in the Super League. On 12 April 2010, he made his Super League debut in a 2–1 home victory against Tianjin TEDA, coming on as a substitute for Kim Eun-Jung in the 72nd minute. He played 9 league matches without scoring a goal in the 2010 league season. Wen didn't make any appearance in the 2010 league season as Changsha Ginde finished the bottom of the league and relegation to China League One. In February 2011, the club moved to Shenzhen as the club's name changed into Shenzhen Phoenix, Wen chose to stay in the club. On 5 May, Wen scored his first goal for the team in a 2011 Chinese FA Cup match which Shenzhen Phoenix beat Shenyang Dongjin 3–0. His first league goal for the club came on 25 June, in a 2–0 away victory against Shenyang Dongjin. The club were bought by Chinese property developers Guangzhou R&F and moved to Guangzhou in June and won promotion back to the Super League at the first attempt. Wen scored 4 goals in 13 appearances in the 2011 league season.

In March 2015, Wen transferred to China League Two side Baoding Yingli ETS.

== Career statistics ==
Statistics accurate as of match played 31 December 2019.

Appearances and goals by club, season and competition
Club	Season	League			National Cup		Continental		Other		Total	
Club	Season	Division	Apps	Goals	Apps	Goals	Apps	Goals	Apps	Goals	Apps	Goals
Changsha Ginde/ Guangzhou R&F	2007	Chinese Super League	0	0	-		-		-		0	0
Changsha Ginde/ Guangzhou R&F	2009	Chinese Super League	9	0	-		-		-		9	0
Changsha Ginde/ Guangzhou R&F	2010	Chinese Super League	0	0	-		-		-		0	0
Changsha Ginde/ Guangzhou R&F	2011	China League One	13	4	2	1	-		-		15	5
Changsha Ginde/ Guangzhou R&F	2012	Chinese Super League	2	0	1	0	-		-		3	0
Changsha Ginde/ Guangzhou R&F	2013	Chinese Super League	0	0	1	0	-		-		1	0
Changsha Ginde/ Guangzhou R&F	2015	Chinese Super League	0	0	0	0	0	0	-		0	0
Changsha Ginde/ Guangzhou R&F	Total		24	4	4	1	0	0	0	0	28	5
Hunan Billows (loans)	2008	China League Two			-		-		-			
Yinchuan Helanshan (loan)	2014	China League Two	5	3	0	0	-		-		5	3
Baoding Yingli ETS	2016	China League Two	20	1	2	0	-		-		22	1
Baoding Yingli ETS	2017	China League One	6	0	1	0	-		-		7	0
Baoding Yingli ETS	Total		26	1	3	0	0	0	0	0	29	1
Taizhou Yuanda	2018	Chinese Champions League	-		-		-		-		-	-
Taizhou Yuanda	2019	China League Two	28	12	5	4	-		-		33	16
Taizhou Yuanda	Total		28	12	5	4	0	0	0	0	33	16
Career total			83	20	12	5	0	0	0	0	95	25
