= Shao Shuai (footballer, born 1989) =

Chinese footballer

Shao Shuai 邵帅
Personal information
- Date of birth: 2 January 1989 (age 37)
- Place of birth: Dalian, Liaoning, China
- Height: 1.83 m (6 ft 0 in)
- Position: Defender

Youth career
- Harbin Yiteng

Senior career*
Years	Team	Apps	(Gls)
2006–2014	Harbin Yiteng	106	(4)
2015–2018	Changchun Yatai	4	(0)
2017	→ Hebei Elite (loan)	11	(0)
2018–2020	Chengdu Better City	4	(0)
2020	Dongguan United	-	(-)
- * Club domestic league appearances and goals as of 31 December 2020

Shao Shuai (Chinese: 邵帅; born 2 January 1989 in Dalian) is a Chinese football player.

== Club career ==
In 2006, Shao Shuai started his professional footballer career with Harbin Yiteng in the China League Two. In the 2011 China League Two campaign he would be part of the team that won the division and promotion into the second tier. He would go on to be a member of the squad as they moved up divisions and gained promotion to the Chinese Super League. He made his Super League debut on 7 March 2014 in a 1–0 away defeat against Shandong Luneng Taishan, coming on as a substitute for Liu Xiaolong in the 89th minute.

Shao transferred to another Super League club Changchun Yatai along with his teammate Han Deming in December 2014. In February 2017, he was loaned to League Two side Hebei Elite until 31 December 2017.

== Career statistics ==
Statistics accurate as of match played 31 December 2020.

Appearances and goals by club, season and competition
Club	Season	League			National Cup		Continental		Other		Total	
Club	Season	Division	Apps	Goals	Apps	Goals	Apps	Goals	Apps	Goals	Apps	Goals
Harbin Yiteng	2006	China League Two			-		-		-			
Harbin Yiteng	2007	China League One	9	0	-		-		-		9	0
Harbin Yiteng	2008	China League One	20	0	-		-		-		20	0
Harbin Yiteng	2009	China League Two			-		-		-			
Harbin Yiteng	2010	China League Two			-		-		-			
Harbin Yiteng	2011	China League Two	16	0	-		-		-		16	0
Harbin Yiteng	2012	China League One	27	1	1	0	-		-		28	1
Harbin Yiteng	2013	China League One	26	3	1	0	-		-		27	3
Harbin Yiteng	2014	Chinese Super League	8	0	1	0	-		-		9	0
Harbin Yiteng	Total		106	4	3	0	0	0	0	0	109	4
Changchun Yatai	2015	Chinese Super League	4	0	1	0	-		-		5	0
Changchun Yatai	2016	Chinese Super League	0	0	1	0	-		-		1	0
Changchun Yatai	Total		4	0	2	0	0	0	0	0	6	0
Hebei Elite (loan)	2017	China League Two	11	0	0	0	-		-		11	0
Chengdu Better City	2018	Chinese Champions League	-		-		-		-		-	-
Chengdu Better City	2019	China League Two	4	0	1	0	-		-		4	0
Chengdu Better City	Total		4	0	1	0	0	0	0	0	5	0
Career total			125	4	6	0	0	0	0	0	131	4

== Honours ==
=== Club ===
Harbin Yiteng

- China League Two: 2011
