= Liu Junpeng =

Chinese footballer

Liu Junpeng 刘君鹏
Personal information
- Full name: Liu Junpeng
- Date of birth: 20 May 1983 (age 43)
- Place of birth: Dalian, Liaoning, China
- Height: 1.86 m (6 ft 1 in)
- Position: Defender

Senior career*
| Years | Team | Apps | (Gls) |
| 2004–2009 | Beijing Hongdeng | 76 | (0) |
| 2010–2011 | Beijing Baxy | 38 | (1) |
| 2012–2017 | Shijiazhuang Ever Bright | 89 | (1) |
| 2018–2020 | Taizhou Yuanda | 42 | (1) |
- * Club domestic league appearances and goals as of 7 November 2020

Liu Junpeng (Chinese: 刘君鹏; pinyin: Liú Jūnpéng, former Chinese character name Chinese: 刘峻鹏; pinyin: Liú Jùnpéng; born 20 May 1983) is a Chinese footballer who currently plays for Taizhou Yuanda in the China League One.

== Club career ==
Liu Junpeng started his football career with China League Two side Beijing Hongdeng. Liu joined Beijing Baxy in 2010 when Beijing Hongdeng's position was taken over by Beijing Baxy. He scored his first senior goal on 22 April 2010 in a 3–1 away win against Nanjing Yoyo.

Liu transferred to China League One side Fujian Smart Hero in 2012. He made his debut for the club on 17 March 2012, in a 1–1 home draw against Yanbian Changbai Tiger. Fujian moved to Hebei Province's capital city Shijiazhuang in 2013. He played 18 league matches in the 2014 season as Shijiazhuang won promotion to the Chinese Super League. On 3 June 2015, Liu made his Super League debut in a 2–2 home draw against Shanghai SIPG. He left the club at the end of 2017 season after the expiration of contract.

== Career statistics ==
Statistics accurate as of match played 28 November 2020.

Appearances and goals by club, season and competition
| Club | Season | League | | | National Cup | | Continental | | Other | | Total | |
| Club | Season | Division | Apps | Goals | Apps | Goals | Apps | Goals | Apps | Goals | Apps | Goals |
|---|---|---|---|---|---|---|---|---|---|---|---|---|
| Beijing Hongdeng | 2004 | China League Two | ? | ? | - | | - | | - | | ? | ? |
| Beijing Hongdeng | 2005 | China League Two | ? | ? | - | | - | | - | | ? | ? |
| Beijing Hongdeng | 2006 | China League One | 21 | 0 | 1 | 0 | - | | - | | 22 | 0 |
| Beijing Hongdeng | 2007 | China League One | 20 | 0 | - | | - | | - | | 20 | 0 |
| Beijing Hongdeng | 2008 | China League One | 22 | 0 | - | | - | | - | | 22 | 0 |
| Beijing Hongdeng | 2009 | China League One | 13 | 0 | - | | - | | - | | 13 | 0 |
| Beijing Hongdeng | Total | | 76 | 0 | 1 | 0 | 0 | 0 | 0 | 0 | 77 | 0 |
| Beijing Baxy | 2010 | China League One | 21 | 1 | - | | - | | - | | 21 | 1 |
| Beijing Baxy | 2011 | China League One | 17 | 0 | 0 | 0 | - | | - | | 17 | 0 |
| Beijing Baxy | Total | | 38 | 1 | 0 | 0 | 0 | 0 | 0 | 0 | 38 | 1 |
| Shijiazhuang Ever Bright | 2012 | China League One | 21 | 1 | 1 | 0 | - | | - | | 22 | 1 |
| Shijiazhuang Ever Bright | 2013 | China League One | 19 | 0 | 2 | 0 | - | | - | | 21 | 0 |
| Shijiazhuang Ever Bright | 2014 | China League One | 18 | 0 | 0 | 0 | - | | - | | 18 | 0 |
| Shijiazhuang Ever Bright | 2015 | Chinese Super League | 10 | 0 | 1 | 0 | - | | - | | 11 | 0 |
| Shijiazhuang Ever Bright | 2016 | Chinese Super League | 11 | 0 | 2 | 0 | - | | - | | 13 | 0 |
| Shijiazhuang Ever Bright | 2017 | China League One | 10 | 0 | 0 | 0 | - | | - | | 10 | 0 |
| Shijiazhuang Ever Bright | Total | | 89 | 1 | 6 | 0 | 0 | 0 | 0 | 0 | 95 | 1 |
| Taizhou Yuanda | 2018 | Chinese Champions League | ? | ? | - | | - | | - | | ? | ? |
| Taizhou Yuanda | 2019 | China League Two | 32 | 1 | 5 | 1 | - | | - | | 37 | 2 |
| Taizhou Yuanda | 2020 | China League One | 10 | 0 | 1 | 0 | - | | - | | 11 | 0 |
| Taizhou Yuanda | Total | | 42 | 1 | 6 | 1 | 0 | 0 | 0 | 0 | 48 | 2 |
| Career total | | | 245 | 3 | 13 | 1 | 0 | 0 | 0 | 0 | 258 | 4 |
