= Alexander N'Doumbou =

Gabonese footballer (born 1992)

Qian Jiegei Alisangte Endubu
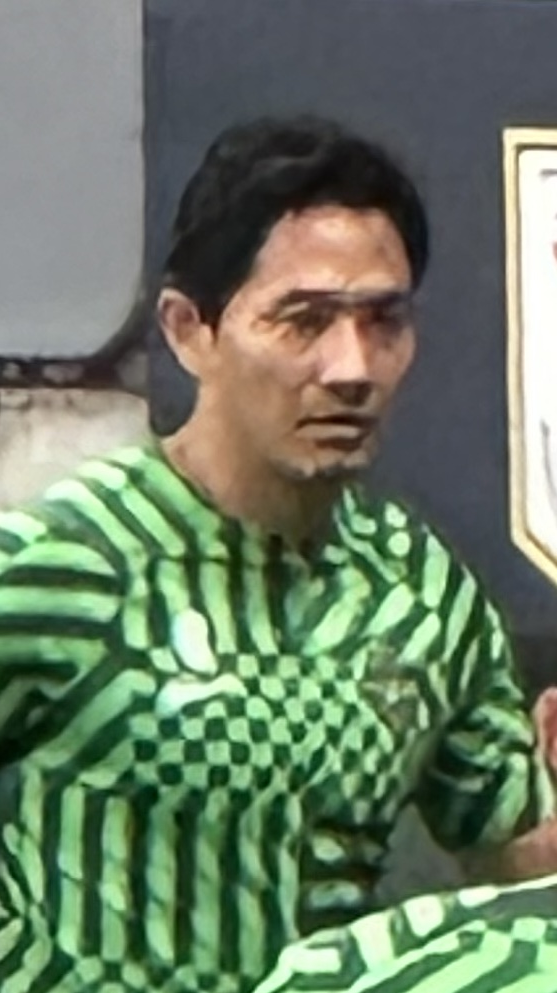
- N'Doumbou in August 2024

Personal information
- Full name: Qian Jiegei Alisangte Endubu
- Birth name: Alexander N'Doumbou
- Date of birth: 4 January 1992 (age 34)
- Place of birth: Port-Gentil, Gabon
- Height: 1.77 m (5 ft 10 in)
- Position: Midfielder

Team information
- Current team: Zhejiang FC
- Number: 8

Youth career
- 1998–2004: Sogara
- 2004–2005: FC Carpentras
- 2005–2006: Martigues
- 2006–2010: Marseille

Senior career*
Years	Team	Apps	(Gls)
2010–2015	Marseille	0	(0)
2011–2013	→ Orléans (loan)	31	(3)
2013–2015	Marseille B	42	(4)
2016–2018	FCV Dender EH	28	(2)
2018–2019	Vereya	15	(0)
2019–2022	Shanghai Shenhua	81	(3)
2023–	Zhejiang FC	75	(0)

International career^{‡}
2011–2012	Gabon U23	8	(0)
2012–2014	Gabon	11	(0)
Medal record
Representing Gabon
Africa U-23 Cup of Nations
Winner	2011 Morocco
- * Club domestic league appearances and goals as of 19 November 2026 ‡ National team caps and goals as of 6 December 2022

Alexander N'Doumbou
- Chinese: 钱杰给
Transcriptions
Standard Mandarin
- Hanyu Pinyin: Qián Jiégěi

Alternative Chinese name
- Chinese: 钱杰给·阿里桑特·恩杜布
Transcriptions
Standard Mandarin
- Hanyu Pinyin: Qián Jiégěi Ālǐsāngtè Ēndùbù

Qian Jiegei Alisangte Endubu (Chinese: 钱杰给·阿里桑特·恩杜布; pinyin: Qián Jiégěi Ālǐsāngtè Ēndùbù; né Alexander N'Doumbou; born 4 January 1992) is a Gabonese professional footballer who plays as a midfielder for Chinese Super League club Zhejiang FC. He formerly represented the Gabon national football team before giving up his Gabonese citizenship to receive the Chinese passport in 2019.

== Club career ==
N'Doumbou began his football career at Division 1 Gabonese club AS Sogara's youth team. At the age of 12, N'Doumbou departed the country for France to join local club FC Carpentras in the south of France. He later had a stint at Martigues before joining Marseille on a trial. After having a successful trial, N'Doumbou was offered an aspirant (youth) contract. While in the club's youth academy, he was captain of the Marseille under-17 team that won the 2008–09 Championnat National Under-17 league title. On 18 November 2009, N'Doumbou signed his first professional contract. The contract took effect on 1 July 2011 as the player had to play out the two years left on his élite contract. N'Doumbou made his professional debut on 9 January 2010, five days after his 18th birthday, in a Coupe de France match against amateur club Trélissac in a 2–0 victory.

On 10 August 2011, N'Doumbou joined Orléans on a one-year loan. After spending a season for the third tier club, N'Doumbou returned to Marseille where he was incorporated in the Marseille B team who were allowed to play in the fifth tier of French football. On 30 June 2013 N'Doumbou was loaned out once again to Orléans. He returned to the Marseille B and despite being included on the bench for Marseille in August 2016, N'Doumbou signed with Belgian third vision side, FCV Dender EH.

In July 2018, N'Doumbou moved to Bulgarian first division club FC Vereya. N'Doumbou resumed his Chinese nationality and joined Chinese Super League side Shanghai Greenland Shenhua in February 2019. N'Doumbou lifted the CFA Cup with Shanghai Greenland Shenhua on 6 December 2019. After four seasons in Shanghai he would move to another Chinese Super League club in Zhejiang on 17 January 2023.

== International career ==
N'Doumbou played for the Gabon national team, earning his first call-up to the team by former coach Alain Giresse in November 2009. He competed for Gabon at the 2012 Summer Olympics. In February 2019, he renounced his Gabonese citizenship to apply Chinese nationality. Given that N'Doumbou appeared in official matches for Gabon, however, he will not be eligible to represent the China national team.

== Personal life ==
N'Doumbou was born in Port-Gentil to a Gabonese father and a Chinese Hakka mother. His parents met in China where his father was attending school.

== Career statistics ==
As of 17 October 2023.

Appearances and goals by club, season and competition
Club	Season	League			National Cup		League Cup		Continental		Total	
Club	Season	Division	Apps	Goals	Apps	Goals	Apps	Goals	Apps	Goals	Apps	Goals
Marseille	2009–10	Ligue 1	0	0	2	0	0	0	0	0	2	0
Marseille	2010–11	Ligue 1	0	0	0	0	0	0	0	0	0	0
Marseille	2011–12	Ligue 1	0	0	0	0	0	0	0	0	0	0
Marseille	2012–13	Ligue 1	0	0	0	0	0	0	0	0	0	0
Marseille	2013–14	Ligue 1	0	0	0	0	0	0	0	0	0	0
Marseille	2014–15	Ligue 1	0	0	0	0	0	0	0	0	0	0
Marseille	Total		0	0	2	0	0	0	0	0	2	0
Orléans (loan)	2011–12	Championnat National	21	3	0	0	—		—		21	3
Orléans (loan)	2012–13	Championnat National	10	0	0	0	—		—		10	0
Orléans (loan)	Total		31	3	0	0	0	0	0	0	31	3
Marseille B	2012–13	Championnat National 3	3	0	—		—		—		3	0
Marseille B	2013–14	Championnat National 3	25	2	—		—		—		25	2
Marseille B	2014–15	Championnat National 3	14	2	—		—		—		14	2
Marseille B	Total		42	4	0	0	0	0	0	0	42	0
FCV Dener EH	2016–17	Belgian First Amateur Division	11	0	0	0	—		—		11	0
FCV Dener EH	2017–18	Belgian First Amateur Division	17	2	0	0	—		—		17	2
FCV Dener EH	Total		28	2	0	0	0	0	0	0	28	2
FC Vereya	2018–19	First Professional Football League	15	0	0	0	—		—		15	0
Shanghai Shenhua	2019	Chinese Super League	24	1	3	1	—		—		27	2
Shanghai Shenhua	2020	Chinese Super League	19	1	1	0	—		4	0	24	1
Shanghai Shenhua	2021	Chinese Super League	9	0	6	0	—		—		15	0
Shanghai Shenhua	2022	Chinese Super League	29	1	0	0	—		—		29	1
Shanghai Shenhua	Total		81	3	10	1	0	0	4	0	95	4
Zhejiang FC	2023	Chinese Super League	23	0	2	0	—		1	0	26	0
Career total			220	12	14	1	0	0	5	0	239	13

== Honours ==
Shanghai Shenhua

- Chinese FA Cup: 2019

Gabon U23

- Africa U-23 Cup of Nations: 2011

== See also ==
- List of Chinese naturalized footballers
