= Gan Rui =

Chinese footballer

Gan Rui 甘锐
Personal information
- Date of birth: January 11, 1985 (age 41)
- Place of birth: Chongqing, Sichuan, China
- Height: 1.72 m (5 ft 7 1/2 in)
- Position: Midfielder

Senior career*
Years	Team	Apps	(Gls)
2005–2014	Chongqing Lifan	152	(5)
2015–2017	Chengdu Qbao	62	(7)
2018–2023	Chengdu Rongcheng	104	(7)
Total		318	(19)

Managerial career
- 2024–: Chengdu Rongcheng (assistant)
- * Club domestic league appearances and goals

Gan Rui (Chinese: 甘锐; born 11 January 1985) is a Chinese former professional footballer who played as a midfielder, most notably for Chengdu Rongcheng, whom he captained during the club's rise from the fourth tier of Chinese football to the top-flight.

== Club career ==
In 2005, Gan Rui started his professional footballer career with Chongqing Lifan in the Chinese Super League. He would eventually make his league debut for Chongqing on 11 March 2006 in a game against Liaoning Whowin, which ended in a 2-1 victory. Unfortunately by the end of the season he was part of the team that was relegated at the end of the season. He would remain with the club as they eventually gained promotion back into the top tier at the end of the 2008 campaign.

On 26 February 2015, Gan transferred to China League Two side Nanjing Qianbao. On 8 January 2016 the club relocated to the city of Chengdu and he would move with them as they renamed themselves Chengdu Qbao. Chengdu Qbao withdrew from League Two in 2018 when the Qbao Group was under investigation with illegal fund raising. On 20 March 2018, a phoenix club was formed by Chengdu Better City Investment Group Co., Ltd. and Gan would join them as they participated in the 2018 Chinese Champions League. He would go on to win promotion with the club as they came runners-up at the end of the 2019 China League Two season. He would captain the team as he aided them to a meteoric rise through the divisions as the club gained promotion to the top tier at the end of the 2021 league campaign.

== Career statistics ==
Statistics accurate as of match played 4 November 2023.

Appearances and goals by club, season and competition
Club	Season	League			National Cup		League Cup		Other		Total	
Club	Season	Division	Apps	Goals	Apps	Goals	Apps	Goals	Apps	Goals	Apps	Goals
Chongqing Lifan	2005	Chinese Super League	0	0	0	0	0	0	-		0	0
Chongqing Lifan	2006	Chinese Super League	21	1	0	0	-		-		21	1
Chongqing Lifan	2007	China League One	5	0	-		-		-		5	0
Chongqing Lifan	2008	China League One	12	0	-		-		-		12	0
Chongqing Lifan	2009	Chinese Super League	19	1	-		-		-		19	1
Chongqing Lifan	2010	Chinese Super League	20	0	-		-		-		20	0
Chongqing Lifan	2011	China League One	24	1	0	0	-		-		24	1
Chongqing Lifan	2012	China League One	29	2	0	0	-		-		29	2
Chongqing Lifan	2013	China League One	22	0	1	0	-		-		23	0
Chongqing Lifan	2014	China League One	0	0	0	0	-		-		0	0
Chongqing Lifan	Total		152	5	1	0	0	0	0	0	153	5
Chengdu Qbao	2015	China League Two	19	1	1	0	-		-		20	1
Chengdu Qbao	2016	China League Two	19	5	2	2	-		-		21	7
Chengdu Qbao	2017	China League Two	24	1	1	1	-		-		25	2
Chengdu Qbao	Total		62	7	4	3	0	0	0	0	66	10
Chengdu Rongcheng	2018	Chinese Champions League	-		-		-		-		-	-
Chengdu Rongcheng	2019	China League Two	31	5	1	0	-		-		32	5
Chengdu Rongcheng	2020	China League One	14	0	1	0	-		-		15	0
Chengdu Rongcheng	2021	China League One	32	2	0	0	-		2 (Note: Appearance(s) in CSL Relegation play-offs)	0	34	2
Chengdu Rongcheng	2022	Chinese Super League	17	0	2	2	-		-		19	2
Chengdu Rongcheng	2023	Chinese Super League	10	0	1	0	-		-		11	0
Chengdu Rongcheng	Total		104	7	5	2	0	0	2	0	111	9
Career total			318	19	10	5	0	0	2	0	330	24

== Honours ==
Chongqing Lifan

- China League One: 2014
