= Chen Zhao =

Chinese association football player

Personal information
- Date of birth: 26 October 1996 (age 30)
- Place of birth: Beijing, China
- Height: 1.89 m (6 ft 2 in)
- Position: Goalkeeper

Team information
- Current team: Wenzhou FC
- Number: 12

Youth career
- Shanghai Luckystar
- –2015: Atlético Madrid
- 2016–2017: CF Pozuelo

Senior career*
Years	Team	Apps	(Gls)
2017–2020	Shanghai Shenhua	17	(0)
2020	→ Qingdao Jonoon (Loan)	9	(0)
2021–2022	Chongqing Liangjiang Athletic	6	(0)
2022	→ Shijiazhuang Gongfu (loan)	0	(0)
2022	Shanghai Mitsubishi		
2023	Qingdao West Coast	26	(0)
2024	Nantong Zhiyun	0	(0)
2024	→ Chongqing Tonglianglong (loan)	2	(0)
2025	Guangdong GZ-Power	2	(0)
2026–	Wenzhou FC	0	(0)
- * Club domestic league appearances and goals as of 14:36, 29 April 2022 (UTC)

Chen Zhao (simplified Chinese: 陈钊; traditional Chinese: 陳釗; pinyin: Chén Zhāo; born 26 October 1996) is a Chinese professional footballer who plays for Wenzhou FC.

== Club career ==
Chen Zhao would play for the various Shanghai Luckystar youth teams before going abroad to continue his development. On 4 July 2017 he would return to China to sign for top-tier club Shanghai Shenhua and was immediately included in their first team squad. On 1 May 2019 Chen made his debut for the club in a Chinese FA Cup game away to Shenzhen FC that Shenhua won. Chen would then make his league debut against Shenzhen F.C. once again in a away match on 5 May 2019 in a 2–1 defeat.

== Career statistics ==
As of 1 September 2024.

Appearances and goals by club, season and competition
Club	Season	League			National Cup		Continental		Other		Total	
Club	Season	Division	Apps	Goals	Apps	Goals	Apps	Goals	Apps	Goals	Apps	Goals
Shanghai Shenhua	2017	Chinese Super League	0	0	0	0	–		–		0	0
Shanghai Shenhua	2018	Chinese Super League	0	0	0	0	0	0	0 (Note: Appearances in Chinese FA Super Cup)	0	0	0
Shanghai Shenhua	2019	Chinese Super League	16	0	3	0	–		–		19	0
Shanghai Shenhua	Total		16	0	3	0	0	0	0	0	19	0
Qingdao Jonoon (Loan)	2020	China League Two	9	0	–		–		–		9	0
Chongqing Liangjiang Athletic	2021	Chinese Super League	6	0	1	0	–		–		7	0
Shijiazhuang Gongfu (loan)	2022	China League One	0	0	0	0	–		–		0	0
Qingdao West Coast	2023	China League One	26	0	0	0	–		–		26	0
Nantong Zhiyun	2024	Chinese Super League	6	0	0	0	–		–		6	0
Chongqing Tonglianglong	2024	China League One	2	0	–		–		–		2	0
Career total			65	0	4	0	0	0	0	0	69	0

== Honours ==
=== Club ===
Shanghai Shenhua

- Chinese FA Cup: 2019
