= Xia Dalong =

Japanese footballer

Personal information
- Date of birth: 17 June 1993 (age 33)
- Place of birth: Nagoya, Japan
- Height: 1.90 m (6 ft 3 in)
- Position: Forward

Team information
- Current team: Shenzhen Peng City
- Number: 29

Senior career*
Years	Team	Apps	(Gls)
2018	Shenzhen Xinqiao		
2019	Baoding Yingli ETS		
2020–2024	Shenzhen Peng City	73	(8)
2024	→ Guangdong GZ-Power (loan)	27	(15)
2025	Guangdong GZ-Power	30	(4)
2026–	Shenzhen Peng City	13	(1)
- * Club domestic league appearances and goals as of 22 November 2026

Xia Dalong (Chinese: 夏达龙; born 27 June 1993) is a Japanese professional footballer who plays as a forward for Shenzhen Peng City.

== Career ==
Born in Nagoya, Japan, Xia started his career with Chinese fourth division side Shenzhen Xinqiao, in an attempt in helping them gaining promotion to the China League Two.

Before the 2019 season, he signed for Baoding Yingli ETS in the Chinese third division.

In 2020, Xia signed for Chinese second division club Sichuan Jiuniu.

In March 2024, he joined China League Two side Guangdong GZ-Power on loan from Shenzhen Peng City following their promotion to the Chinese Super League. On 30 December 2025, Xia announced his departure and return to Shenzhen Peng City in 2026.

== Career statistics ==
As of 7 May 2021

Appearances and goals by club, season and competition
Club	Season	League			Cup		Total	
Club	Season	Division	Apps	Goals	Apps	Goals	Apps	Goals
Sichuan Jiuniu	2021	China League One	3	0	-		3	0
