= Piao Taoyu =

Chinese association football player

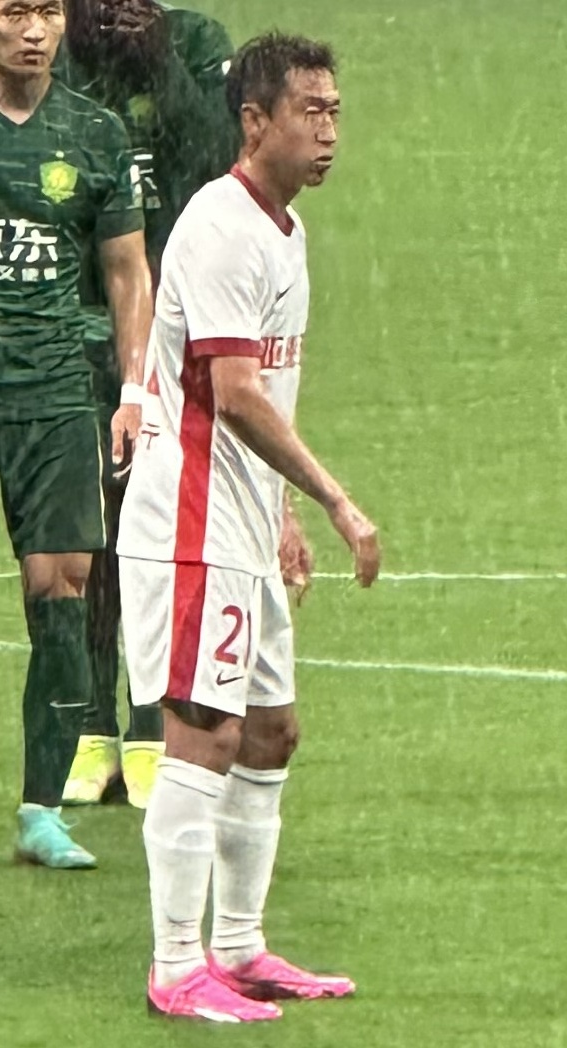
- Piao Taoyu in June 2025

Personal information
- Date of birth: 18 May 1993 (age 33)
- Place of birth: Yanbian, Jilin, China
- Height: 1.77 m (5 ft 10 in)
- Position: Midfielder

Team information
- Current team: Changchun Yatai
- Number: 21

Senior career*
Years	Team	Apps	(Gls)
2013	Yanbian Baekdu Tigers	11	(1)
2015–2018	Zhejiang Yiteng	101	(5)
2019–2021	Tianjin TEDA	27	(0)
2022	Chongqing Liangjiang	0	(0)
2022–2023	Tianjin Jinmen Tiger	31	(2)
2024	Qingdao West Coast	0	(0)
2024	→ Heilongjiang Ice City (loan)	19	(0)
2025–	Changchun Yatai	20	(0)
- * Club domestic league appearances and goals as of 28 August 2025

Piao Taoyu (simplified Chinese: 朴韬宇; traditional Chinese: 朴韜宇; pinyin: Piáo Tāoyǔ; born 18 May 1993) is a Chinese professional footballer currently playing as a midfielder for Chinese Super League club Changchun Yatai.

== Club career ==
Piao Taoyu would begin his formal football training in Qingdao before having a spell at Zhejiang Greentown and even going abroad from April 2010 to March 2012 to play in the high school football league for Oisca High School in Hamamatsu City, Shizuoka Prefecture, Japan. Piao would return to his hometown and join second-tier football club Yanbian Baekdu Tigers in the 2013 league season. After a 3–2 defeat to Hunan Billows on 12 April 2013, Piao was dropped from the first team. The club would issue a statement that the reason why he was dropped was because he disrespected a coach by wearing headphones when he was spoken to. The Head coach Cho Keung-yeon would issue similar draconian punishments to several other members of the squad, which resulted in a player strike unless the head coach was sacked. With a new head coach and a return to the senior team to help them avoid relegation, Piao decided to leave the team at the end of the season and went off to train with South Korean side Jeonnam Dragons.

=== Zhejiang Yiteng ===
At the beginning of the 2015 league season Piao would join another second-tier club in Harbin Yiteng and follow them as the relocated to Zhejiang and renamed themselves Zhejiang Yiteng. He would make his debut for the club in a league game against Jiangxi Liansheng on 22 March 2015, which ended in a 2–1 victory. This would be followed by his first goal for the club on 13 August 2016 in a league game against Hunan Billows that ended in a 5–1 victory.

=== Tianjin TEDA ===
On 27 February 2019, Piao joined top tier club Tianjin TEDA for the 2019 Chinese Super League campaign. On 30 April 2019, He made his debut in a Chinese FA Cup fourth round tie against Zibo Cuju in a 4-1 home victory, where he also scored his first goal for the club. He would be used as a squad player for several seasons until he joined fellow top tier club Chongqing Liangjiang on 27 April 2022. He would not play for the club after it was dissolved on 24 May 2022 due to financial difficulties. On 2 June 2022 before the start of the 2022 Chinese Super League campaign, he would rejoin his former club in Tianjin, who had renamed themselves as Tianjin Jinmen Tiger.

In February 2024, Piao joined newly promoted Chinese Super League club Qingdao West Coast, but was immediately loaned to China League One club Heilongjiang Ice City on 28 February 2024.

=== Changchun Yatai ===
On 28 January 2025, Piao joined fellow Chinese Super League club Changchun Yatai on a free transfer.

== Career statistics ==
As of 3 November 2024.

Appearances and goals by club, season and competition
Club	Season	League			National Cup		Continental		Other		Total	
Club	Season	Division	Apps	Goals	Apps	Goals	Apps	Goals	Apps	Goals	Apps	Goals
Yanbian Baekdu Tigers	2013	China League One	11	1	1	0	–		–		12	1
Zhejiang Yiteng	2015	China League One	22	0	1	0	–		–		23	0
Zhejiang Yiteng	2016	China League One	25	2	1	0	–		–		26	2
Zhejiang Yiteng	2017	China League One	26	1	1	0	–		–		27	1
Zhejiang Yiteng	2018	China League One	28	2	0	0	–		–		28	2
Zhejiang Yiteng	Total		101	5	3	0	0	0	0	0	104	5
Tianjin TEDA	2019	Chinese Super League	6	0	3	1	–		–		9	1
Tianjin TEDA	2020	Chinese Super League	10	0	2	1	–		–		12	1
Tianjin TEDA	2021	Chinese Super League	11	0	2	0	–		–		13	0
Tianjin TEDA	2022	Chinese Super League	21	2	1	1	–		–		22	3
Tianjin TEDA	2023	Chinese Super League	10	0	2	0	–		–		12	0
Tianjin TEDA	Total		58	2	10	3	0	0	0	0	68	5
Qingdao West Coast	2024	Chinese Super League	0	0	0	0	–		–		0	0
Heilongjiang Ice City (loan)	2024	China League One	19	0	0	0	–		–		19	0
Career total			189	8	14	3	0	0	0	0	203	11
