= Shanxi Longjin F.C. =

Chinese association football club in Taiyuan (2015–2022)

Shanxi Longjin 山西龙晋
- Full name: Shanxi Longjin Football Club 山西龙晋足球俱乐部
- Founded: 2 November 2015; 10 years ago
- Dissolved: April 2022; 4 years ago
- 2021: League Two, 6th of 24
Home colours	Away colours

Shanxi Longjin Football Club (Chinese: 山西龙晋足球俱乐部) is a defunct Chinese football club that participated in the China League Two. The team was based in Taiyuan, Shanxi.

== History ==
Hebei Lion F.C. was founded on November 2, 2015, in the city of Cangzhou, in Hebei Province, and started to participate in China Amateur Football League to aim for promotion to China League Two. After failing to make it out of group stages two consecutive seasons (2016 and 2017), the club moved to Taiyuan, Shanxi Province, changed its name to Shanxi Metropolis F.C., and started the year by winning the 2018 Shanxi Super League by beating Shanxi Zhisheng in the finals. In their third attempt for promotion, they participated in 2018 Chinese Champions League and although narrowly missing promotion by being eliminated by Hangzhou Wuyue Qiantang at quarter-finals, then losing to Lhasa Urban Construction Investment 1–2 at home, they were later admitted into 2019 China League Two to fill vacancy left by withdrawn team Dalian Transcendence.

In March 2020, they changed their name to Shanxi Longjin F.C.

The club was dissolved after 2021 season.

== Name history ==
- 2015–2017 Hebei Lion F.C. 河北信友
- 2018–2019 Shanxi Metropolis F.C. 山西信都
- 2020–2021 Shanxi Longjin F.C. 山西龙晋

== Results ==
All-time league rankings

As of the end of 2019 season.

Year	Div	Pld	W	D	L	GF	GA	GD	Pts	Pos.	FA Cup	Super Cup	AFC	Att./G	Stadium
2016	4									Group	DNQ	DNQ	DNQ		
2017	4									Group	DNQ	DNQ	DNQ		
2018	4									7th	DNQ	DNQ	DNQ		Shanxi Sports Centre Stadium
2019	3	30	2	4	24	12	82	−70	10	32	R1	DNQ	DNQ		Shanxi Sports Centre Stadium

Key

	China top division
	China second division
	China third division
	China fourth division
W	Winners
RU	Runners-up
3	Third place
	Relegated

- Pld = Played
- W = Games won
- D = Games drawn
- L = Games lost
- F = Goals for
- A = Goals against
- Pts = Points
- Pos = Final position
- DNQ = Did not qualify
- DNE = Did not enter
- NH = Not Held
- WD = Withdrawal
- – = Does Not Exist
- R1 = Round 1
- R2 = Round 2
- R3 = Round 3
- R4 = Round 4
- F = Final
- SF = Semi-finals
- QF = Quarter-finals
- R16 = Round of 16
- Group = Group stage
- GS2 = Second Group stage
- QR1 = First Qualifying Round
- QR2 = Second Qualifying Round
- QR3 = Third Qualifying Round
