= Lhasa Urban Construction Investment F.C. =

Chinese football club

Lhasa Urban Construction Investment 拉萨城投
- Full name: Lhasa Urban Construction Investment Football Club 拉萨城投足球俱乐部
- Founded: 2017; 8 years ago
- Dissolved: June 12, 2020
- Ground: EBI-F
- Capacity: 4,500
- 2019: China League Two, 13th of 16

Lhasa Urban Construction Investment Football Club (simplified Chinese: 拉萨城投; traditional Chinese: 拉薩城投; pinyin: Lāsà Chéngtóu) was a Chinese football club founded in 2017 and last participated in the China League Two. The team was based in Deyang, Sichuan. They wore yellow home kits and blue away kits.

On June 12, 2020, the club was announced to be dissolved.

== Managerial history ==
- (China) Xie Yuxin (2017)
- (China) Zhang Biao (2018–2019)

== Results ==
All-time league rankings

As of the end of 2019 season.

Year	Div	Pld	W	D	L	GF	GA	GD	Pts	Pos.	FA Cup	Super Cup	AFC	Att./G	Stadium
2017	4	2	2	0	0	8	0	8	6^{1}	6	DNQ	DNQ	DNQ		Lhasa Cultural Sports Center Stadium
2018	4	3	3	0	0	12	0	12	9^{1}	5	DNQ	DNQ	DNQ		Nyingchi City Stadium
2019	3	30	8	6	16	29	39	−10	30^{1}	26	R3	DNQ	DNQ		Deyang Sports Park Stadium

- ^1 In group stage.

Key

	China top division
	China second division
	China third division
	China fourth division
W	Winners
RU	Runners-up
3	Third place
	Relegated

- Pld = Played
- W = Games won
- D = Games drawn
- L = Games lost
- F = Goals for
- A = Goals against
- Pts = Points
- Pos = Final position
- DNQ = Did not qualify
- DNE = Did not enter
- NH = Not Held
- WD = Withdrawal
- – = Does Not Exist
- R1 = Round 1
- R2 = Round 2
- R3 = Round 3
- R4 = Round 4
- F = Final
- SF = Semi-finals
- QF = Quarter-finals
- R16 = Round of 16
- Group = Group stage
- GS2 = Second Group stage
- QR1 = First Qualifying Round
- QR2 = Second Qualifying Round
- QR3 = Third Qualifying Round
