= Taizhou Yuanda F.C. =

Chinese football club

Taizhou Yuanda 泰州远大
- Full name: Taizhou Yuanda Football Club 泰州远大足球俱乐部
- Founded: 22 January 2017; 9 years ago
- Dissolved: 20 March 2021; 5 years ago
- Ground: Taixing Sports Center
- Capacity: 8000
- Manager: Yin Tiesheng
- League: China League One
- 2020: League One, 6th of 18
- Website: tzydfc.com
Home colours	Away colours

Taizhou Yuanda Football Club (Chinese: 泰州远大足球俱乐部; pinyin: Tàizhōu Yuǎndà Zúqiú Jùlèbù) was a professional association football club based in Taixing, Taizhou, Jiangsu province, China. Founded on 22 January 2017, the club competed in the CMCL (2018), China League Two (2019), and China League One (2020) before dissolving on 20 March 2021 following the withdrawal of investment by its parent company.

== History ==
=== Formation and early years (2017–2018) ===
The club was formally established on 22 January 2017 by Taizhou Yuanda Investment Group Co., Ltd., a local private enterprise, making it the first professional football club in the Taizhou region. In March 2018, the club appointed veteran Chinese coach Yin Tiesheng as head coach.

Taizhou Yuanda began its competitive journey in the 2018 Jiangsu Provincial Amateur Football Super League, winning the championship with an undefeated record. The club then entered the 2018 CMCL, where it topped Group B in the North division and progressed through the knockout rounds. In the final, Taizhou Yuanda defeated Chengdu Xingcheng 4–2 on aggregate (4–1 at home on 4 November, 0–1 away on 11 November) to win the championship and earn promotion to China League Two for the 2019 season.

=== Rise through the leagues (2019) ===
In the 2019 China League Two season, Taizhou Yuanda finished second in the Northern Group with a record of 22 wins, 5 draws, and 3 losses from 30 matches, scoring 76 goals.In July 2019, the club signed former Chinese international Jiang Ning from Hebei China Fortune.

In the promotion playoffs, Taizhou Yuanda defeated Jiangxi Liansheng 3–2 on aggregate and then drew 1–1 with Suzhou Dongwu in the third-place final, winning on penalties after a 2–2 aggregate draw on 2 November 2019 to secure promotion to China League One. The club achieved three consecutive promotions from its founding in 2017 to reaching China League One in 2019.

In the 2019 Chinese FA Cup, the club recorded a notable upset by defeating Chinese Super League side Guangzhou R&F 1–0 at home on 1 May 2019, with Xu Jiajun scoring the only goal, to reach the Round of 16.

=== China League One and dissolution (2020–2021) ===
Ahead of its debut 2020 China League One campaign, the club signed several experienced players including former Chinese internationals Liu Jianye and Cheng Yuan, as well as foreign players such as Serbian international Zoran Tošić, Nigerian striker Chukwu, and Croatian defender Marko Bašić. The 2020 season was heavily disrupted by the COVID-19 pandemic and played under a centralized tournament format in Chengdu. In the first stage, Taizhou Yuanda finished second in Group A with 5 wins, 3 draws, and 2 losses from 10 matches, qualifying for the promotion stage. In the second-stage promotion group, the team lost all five matches, finishing sixth among the six teams with an overall record of 5 wins, 3 draws, and 7 losses from 15 matches.

Following the 2020 season, parent company Taizhou Yuanda Investment Group announced it would withdraw funding. The club explored relocation to Wuxi and Changzhou, and later held negotiations with Nanjing interests about a potential move that would see the club renamed "Jiangsu Team" to preserve football resources following the dissolution of Jiangsu F.C., but no agreement was reached. On 20 March 2021, the club issued a statement announcing its immediate withdrawal from Chinese football and the cancellation of its 2021 season registration. The Chinese Football Association formally disqualified Taizhou Yuanda from the 2021 China League One on 29 March 2021, alongside five other clubs, citing financial difficulties and the impact of the pandemic on investors.

After dissolution, the club's U15–U16 youth teams were reportedly acquired by Changchun Yatai F.C., with players retaining their Taizhou student registrations. Some former staff and players pursued unpaid wages through arbitration, alleging that the club had changed its legal representative shortly before dissolution in a move legal experts interpreted as an attempt to shield investors from liability.

== Stadium ==
Taizhou Yuanda played its home matches at the Taixing Sports Center (also known as Taixing Stadium), which had a reported capacity of 8,000 spectators. Due to the COVID-19 pandemic, the club's 2020 China League One matches were held in Chengdu, Sichuan under a centralized tournament system across three venues: Shuangliu Sports Center, Dujiangyan Phoenix Stadium, and Chengdu Longquanyi Football Stadium.

== Notable players ==
=== Africa ===
Nigeria

- (Nigeria) Daniel Chima Chukwu

=== Europe ===
Croatia

- (Croatia) Marko Bašić

Serbia

- (Serbia) Zoran Tošić

== Coaching staff ==
Position	Staff
Head coach	(China) Yin Tiesheng
Fitness Coach	(Spain) Andres Pedrejon

Source: CFA

== Results ==
All-time league rankings

As of the end of 2020 season.

Year	Div	Pld	W	D	L	GF	GA	GD	Pts	Pos.	FA Cup	Super Cup	AFC	Att./G	Stadium
2018	4									W	DNQ	DNQ	DNQ		Taixing Sports Center Stadium
2019	3	30	22	5	3	76	21	55	71	3	R16	DNQ	DNQ		Taixing Sports Center Stadium
2020	2	15	5	3	7	16	19	-3	18	6	R2	DNQ	DNQ		Taixing Sports Center Stadium

Key

	China top division
	China second division
	China third division
	China fourth division
W	Winners
RU	Runners-up
3	Third place
	Relegated

- Pld = Played
- W = Games won
- D = Games drawn
- L = Games lost
- F = Goals for
- A = Goals against
- Pts = Points
- Pos = Final position
- DNQ = Did not qualify
- DNE = Did not enter
- NH = Not Held
- WD = Withdrawal
- – = Does Not Exist
- R1 = Round 1
- R2 = Round 2
- R3 = Round 3
- R4 = Round 4
- F = Final
- SF = Semi-finals
- QF = Quarter-finals
- R16 = Round of 16
- Group = Group stage
- GS2 = Second Group stage
- QR1 = First Qualifying Round
- QR2 = Second Qualifying Round
- QR3 = Third Qualifying Round
