= Hohai University Stadium =

Multi-use stadium in Nanjing, China

- Interactive map of Hohai University Stadium
- Location: Nanjing, China
- Capacity: 5,000
- Surface: Grass

Hohai University Stadium (Simplified Chinese: 河海大学体育场) is a 5,000-capacity multi-use grass stadium located at Hohai University in Nanjing, China. It is primarily used for football matches. The most recent competitive football match held there was in 2019, a 0–0 draw between Nanjing Shaye and Qingdao Kunpeng during the first round of the Chinese domestic cup.
