= Yingkou Olympic Sports Centre Stadium =

Sports venue in Yingkou, China

- Location: Yingkou, Liaoning, China
- Capacity: 35,000

The Yingkou Olympic Sports Centre Stadium is a sports venue in Yingkou, Liaoning, China. It has a capacity of approximately 35,000 people and primarily hosts football matches. It is covered in artificial grass.
