= Shanxi Sports Centre Stadium =

Sports venue in Taiyuan, Shanxi, China

Coordinates: 37°45′26″N 112°31′47″E

Shanxi Sports Centre Stadium 山西体育中心体育场
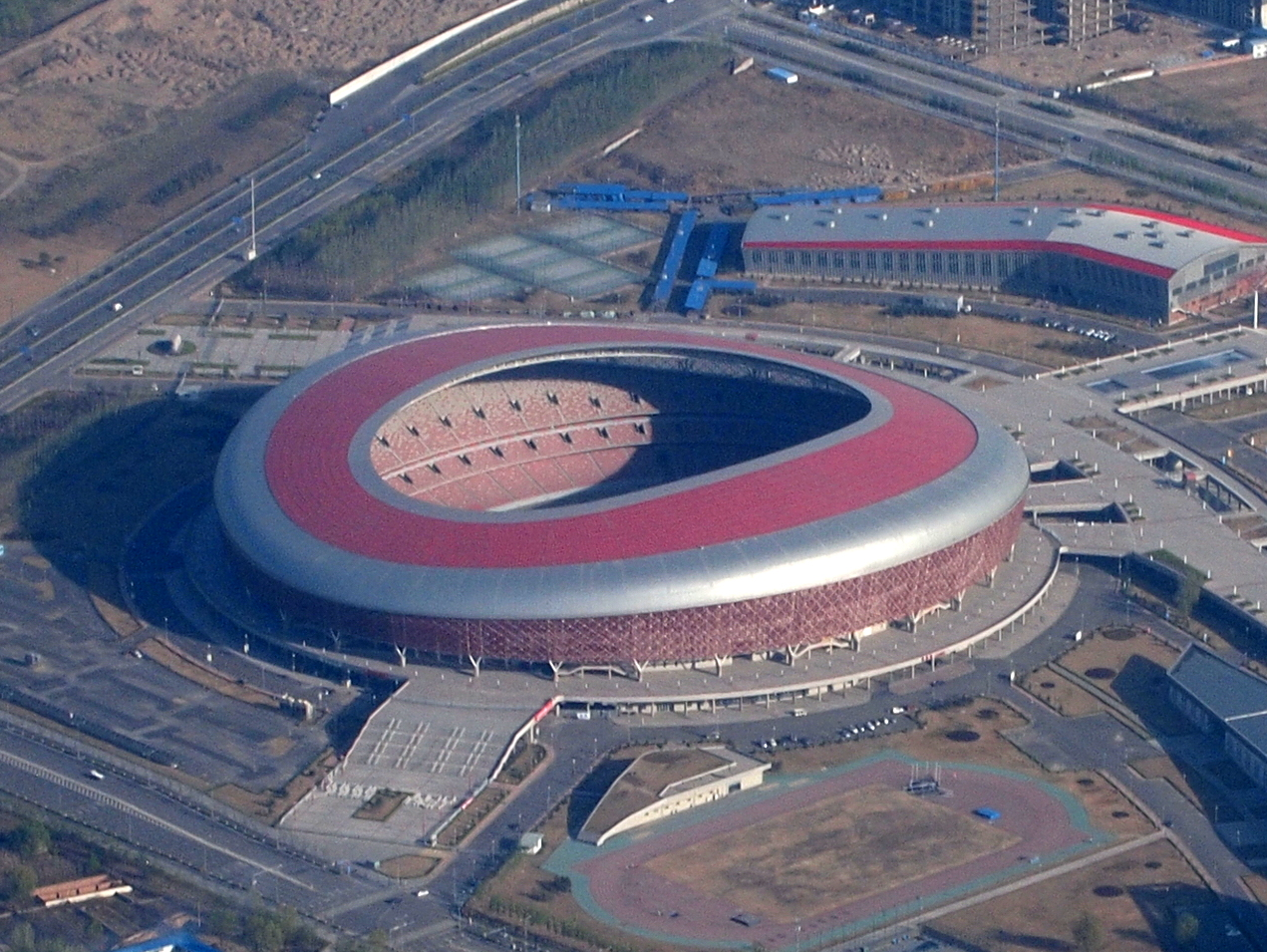
- Interactive map of Shanxi Sports Centre Stadium 山西体育中心体育场
- Full name: Shanxi Sports Centre Stadium
- Location: Intersection of Binhe W Rd & Jiankang N St, Jinyuan District, Taiyuan, Shanxi, China
- Capacity: 62,000
- Public transit: 2 at Dianzixijie

Construction
- Groundbreaking: 2009
- Opened: 2011

Shanxi Sports Centre Stadium (Chinese: 山西体育中心体育场; pinyin: Shānxī Tǐyù Zhōngxīn Tǐyùchǎng) is a multi-purpose stadium in Taiyuan, Shanxi, China. It is currently used mostly for association football matches. The stadium holds 62,000 spectators.

== See also ==
- List of football stadiums in China
- List of stadiums in China
- Lists of stadiums
