= Jimo City Stadium =

Sports venue in Qingdao, China

Coordinates: 36°23′33″N 120°26′02″E

Jimo City Stadium (Simplified Chinese: 即墨市体育场) is a 5,000-capacity multi-use stadium in Jimo, Qingdao, Shandong, China. It is currently used mostly for association football matches.

It is located at 198 Lan'ao Road, Jimo. The stadium was reconstructed in 2000s.
