= Shenzhen Xinqiao F.C. =

Chinese association football club

Shenzhen Xinqiao 深圳新桥
- Full name: Shenzhen Xinqiao Football Club 深圳新桥足球俱乐部
- Founded: 2017; 9 years ago
- Ground: Xixiang Sports Center, Shenzhen, China
- Manager: Shen Ming
- 2018: Chinese Champions League, 14th

Shenzhen Xinqiao Football Club (Chinese: 深圳新桥足球俱乐部) is a professional Chinese football club based in Shenzhen, Guangdong.

== History ==
Shenzhen Xinqiao qualified and gained a license for 2019 China League Two. However, the club officially quit from Chinese professional league system on 26 February 2019 and retook part in Shenzhen Super League.

== Current squad ==
As of 20 July 2018

== Results ==
All-time league rankings

As of the end of 2018 season.

| Year | Div | Pld | W | D | L | GF | GA | GD | Pts | Pos. | FA Cup | Super Cup | AFC | Att./G | Stadium |
|---|---|---|---|---|---|---|---|---|---|---|---|---|---|---|---|
| 2018 | 4 | | | | | | | | | 14th | DNQ | DNQ | DNQ | | Xixiang Sports Center |

Key

| | China top division |
| | China second division |
| | China third division |
| | China fourth division |
| W | Winners |
| RU | Runners-up |
| 3 | Third place |
| | Relegated |

- Pld = Played
- W = Games won
- D = Games drawn
- L = Games lost
- F = Goals for
- A = Goals against
- Pts = Points
- Pos = Final position
- DNQ = Did not qualify
- DNE = Did not enter
- NH = Not Held
- WD = Withdrawal
- – = Does Not Exist
- R1 = Round 1
- R2 = Round 2
- R3 = Round 3
- R4 = Round 4
- F = Final
- SF = Semi-finals
- QF = Quarter-finals
- R16 = Round of 16
- Group = Group stage
- GS2 = Second Group stage
- QR1 = First Qualifying Round
- QR2 = Second Qualifying Round
- QR3 = Third Qualifying Round
