= List of Chinese football transfers winter 2023 =

This is a list of Chinese football transfers for the 2023 season winter transfer window.

== Super League ==
=== Beijing Guoan ===
In:

No.	Pos.	Nation	Player
-	DF	(China) CHN	Yang Fan (loan return from Tianjin Jinmen Tiger)
-	FW	(China) CHN	Li Boxi (loan return from Guangxi Pingguo Haliao)
-	MF	(China) CHN	Jiang Wenhao (loan return from Guangxi Pingguo Haliao)
-	FW	(China) CHN	Leng Jixuan (loan return from Guangxi Pingguo Haliao)
-	MF	(China) CHN	Xie Longfei (loan return from Qingdao Youth Island)
-	GK	(China) CHN	Han Jiaqi (from Guangzhou City)
-	DF	(China) CHN	Li Lei (from Grasshoppers)
-	MF	(Brazil) BRA	Souza (from Beşiktaş J.K.)
-	MF	(China) CHN	Feng Boxuan (from Henan Songshan Longmen)
-	FW	(China) CHN	Yang Liyu (from Guangzhou F.C.)
-	FW	(China) CHN	Fang Hao (from Shandong Taishan)
-	DF	(Cameroon) CMR	Michael Ngadeu-Ngadjui (from Gent)
-	FW	(North Macedonia) MKD	Arijan Ademi (from Dinamo Zagreb)

Out:

No.	Pos.	Nation	Player
5	DF	(Bosnia and Herzegovina) BIH	Samir Memišević (loan return to Hebei)
7	MF	(China) CHN	John Hou Sæter (to (Norway) Ranheim)

=== Cangzhou Mighty Lions ===
In:

No.	Pos.	Nation	Player
-	MF	(China) CHN	Anwar Memet-Ali (loan return from Guangxi Pingguo Haliao)
-	MF	(China) CHN	Liu Ziming (loan return from Liaoning Shenyang Urban)
-	FW	(China) CHN	Zhao Xuebin (loan return from Xinjiang Tianshan Leopard)
-	MF	(China) CHN	Chen Zeng (loan return from Zibo Cuju)
-	DF	(China) CHN	Wang Peng (loan return from Yanbian Longding)
-	FW	(China) CHN	Zhang Aokai (loan return from Jiangxi Dark Horse Junior)
-	DF	(Croatia) CRO	Mile Škorić (from Osijek)

Out:

No.	Pos.	Nation	Player
35	DF	(China) CHN	Wang Peng (loan return to Shenzhen)

=== Changchun Yatai ===
In:

No.	Pos.	Nation	Player
-	DF	(China) CHN	Zhu Mingxin (loan return from Guangxi Pingguo Haliao)

Out:

No.	Pos.	Nation	Player
6	DF	(China) CHN	He Guan (loan return to Shanghai Port)
7	FW	(South Africa) RSA	Dino Ndlovu (to (Turkey) Boluspor)
9	FW	(Brazil) BRA	Júnior Negrão (Released)
11	FW	(Brazil) BRA	Erik (to (Japan) Machida Zelvia)

=== Chengdu Rongcheng ===
In:

No.	Pos.	Nation	Player
-	DF	(China) CHN	Li Zhi (loan return from Kunshan)
-	MF	(China) CHN	Gong Hankui (loan return from Nantong Zhiyun)
-	FW	(China) CHN	Ma Xiaolei (loan return from Sichuan Jiuniu)
-	MF	(China) CHN	Wu Zhuangfei (loan return from Shanghai Jiading Huilong)
-	DF	(China) CHN	Luo Xin (loan return from Shijiazhuang Gongfu)
-	MF	(China) CHN	Tang Miao (loan return from Zibo Cuju)
-	MF	(China) CHN	He Xin (loan return from Shaanxi Chang'an Athletic)
-	MF	(China) CHN	Hu Mingtian (loan return from Shaanxi Chang'an Athletic)
-	MF	(China) CHN	Zhao Wenzhi (loan return from Quanzhou Yassin)
-	MF	(China) CHN	Wang Chaolong (loan return from Quanzhou Yassin)
-	FW	(China) CHN	Cheng Zuhao (loan return from Quanzhou Yassin)

Out:

No.	Pos.	Nation	Player
12	MF	(Brazil) BRA	Saldanha (loan return to (Japan) JEF United Chiba)

=== Dalian Pro ===
In:

No.	Pos.	Nation	Player
-	MF	(China) CHN	Zhu Jiaxuan (loan return from Heilongjiang Ice City)
-	MF	(China) CHN	Chen Rong (loan return from Liaoning Shenyang Urban)
-	MF	(China) CHN	Zheng Bofan (loan return from Beijing BSU)
-	GK	(China) CHN	Li Xuebo (loan return from Zibo Cuju)
-	DF	(China) CHN	Yang Pengju (loan return from Zibo Cuju)
-	FW	(China) CHN	Zhang Jiansheng (loan return from Shaanxi Chang'an Athletic)

Out:

No.	Pos.	Nation	Player

=== Guangzhou City ===
In:

No.	Pos.	Nation	Player

Out:

No.	Pos.	Nation	Player
10	MF	(China) CHN	Li Tixiang (to Zhejiang)

=== Henan Songshan Longmen ===
In:

No.	Pos.	Nation	Player

Out:

No.	Pos.	Nation	Player
9	FW	(Brazil) BRA	Henrique Dourado (Released)
16	FW	(China) CHN	Parmanjan Kyum (loan return to Guangzhou)
25	FW	(Argentina) ARG	Guido Carrillo (to (Argentina) Estudiantes (LP))

=== Kunshan ===
In:

No.	Pos.	Nation	Player
-	MF	(China) CHN	Zhang Yujie (loan return from Heilongjiang Ice City)
-	MF	(China) CHN	Cheng Xianfeng (loan return from Heilongjiang Ice City)
-	MF	(China) CHN	Liu Ruicheng (loan return from Jiangxi Dark Horse Junior)
-	DF	(China) CHN	Ou Xueqian (loan return from Jiangxi Dark Horse Junior)
-	MF	(China) CHN	Lin Zehao (loan return from Jiangxi Dark Horse Junior)

Out:

No.	Pos.	Nation	Player
15	DF	(China) CHN	Yu Rui (loan return to Shanghai Port)
16	DF	(China) CHN	Li Zhi (loan return to Chengdu Rongcheng)
28	DF	(China) CHN	Zhao Mingjian (loan return to Shanghai Shenhua)
38	DF	(China) CHN	Fu Huan (loan return to Shanghai Port)
44	MF	(China) CHN	Pedro Delgado (loan return to Shandong Taishan)

=== Meizhou Hakka ===
In:

No.	Pos.	Nation	Player
-	DF	(China) CHN	Tao Zhilüe (loan return from Qingdao Hainiu)
-	MF	(China) CHN	Zhang Shuai (loan return from Zibo Cuju)
-	DF	(China) CHN	Zhang Sijie (loan return from Shaanxi Chang'an Athletic)
-	MF	(China) CHN	Chen Xing (loan return from Shaanxi Chang'an Athletic)

Out:

No.	Pos.	Nation	Player

=== Nantong Zhiyun ===
In:

No.	Pos.	Nation	Player
-	MF	(China) CHN	Wang Song (from Shijiazhuang Gongfu)
-	MF	(China) CHN	Memet-Abdulla Ezmat (loan return from Guangxi Pingguo Haliao)
-	DF	(China) CHN	Zhao Shuhao (loan return from Shijiazhuang Gongfu)

Out:

No.	Pos.	Nation	Player
19	MF	(China) CHN	Gong Hankui (loan return to Chengdu Rongcheng)
21	GK	(China) CHN	Wu Yaoshengxuan (to Shanghai Mitsubishi Heavy Industries Flying Lion)
39	MF	(China) CHN	Lei Wenjie (loan return to Shanghai Port)

=== Qingdao Hainiu ===
In:

No.	Pos.	Nation	Player
-	DF	(China) CHN	Liu Weicheng (loan return from Liaoning Shenyang Urban)
-	FW	(China) CHN	Xiao Zhi (loan return from Liaoning Shenyang Urban)
-	FW	(China) CHN	Du Wenxiang (loan return from Zibo Cuju)
-	FW	(China) CHN	Hu Ming (loan return from Zibo Cuju)
-	FW	(China) CHN	Zhou Baolin (loan return from Qingdao Red Lions)
-	FW	(China) CHN	Pang Chengtai (loan return from Qingdao Red Lions)

Out:

No.	Pos.	Nation	Player
4	DF	(China) CHN	Liu Junshuai (loan return to Shandong Taishan)
19	DF	(China) CHN	Cao Sheng (loan return to Shandong Taishan)
22	MF	(China) CHN	Xie Wenneng (loan return to Shandong Taishan)
30	MF	(Mali) MLI	Ibrahim Kane (loan return to (Ukraine) Vorskla Poltava)
38	DF	(China) CHN	Tao Zhilüe (loan return to Meizhou Hakka)

=== Shandong Taishan ===
In:

No.	Pos.	Nation	Player
-	DF	(China) CHN	Liu Junshuai (loan return from Qingdao Hainiu)
-	DF	(China) CHN	Cao Sheng (loan return from Qingdao Hainiu)
-	MF	(China) CHN	Xie Wenneng (loan return from Qingdao Hainiu)
-	MF	(China) CHN	Pedro Delgado (loan return from Kunshan)
-	DF	(China) CHN	Wu Lei (loan return from Suzhou Dongwu)
-	FW	(China) CHN	Lu Yongtao (loan return from Qingdao Youth Island)
-	MF	(China) CHN	Zhang Yuanshu (loan return from Zibo Cuju)
-	MF	(China) CHN	Liu Chaoyang (loan return from Shaanxi Chang'an Athletic)

Out:

No.	Pos.	Nation	Player

=== Shanghai Port ===
In:

No.	Pos.	Nation	Player
-	DF	(China) CHN	Zhang Wei (loan return from Tianjin Jinmen Tiger)
-	DF	(China) CHN	He Guan (loan return from Changchun Yatai)
-	DF	(China) CHN	Yu Rui (loan return from Kunshan)
-	DF	(China) CHN	Fu Huan (loan return from Kunshan)
-	MF	(China) CHN	Lei Wenjie (loan return from Nantong Zhiyun)
-	FW	(China) CHN	Huang Zhenfei (loan return from Nanjing City)

Out:

No.	Pos.	Nation	Player

=== Shanghai Shenhua ===
In:

No.	Pos.	Nation	Player
-	MF	(China) CHN	Xu Haoyang (loan return from Wuhan Three Towns)
-	DF	(China) CHN	Zhao Mingjian (loan return from Kunshan)
-	MF	(China) CHN	Lü Pin (loan return from Guangxi Pingguo Haliao)
-	MF	(China) CHN	Sun Qinhan (loan return from Heilongjiang Ice City)
-	FW	(China) CHN	Song Runtong (loan return from Heilongjiang Ice City)
-	DF	(China) CHN	Su Shihao (loan return from Qingdao Youth Island)

Out:

No.	Pos.	Nation	Player
7	MF	(Gabon) GAB	Alexander N'Doumbou (to Zhejiang)
11	MF	(Ecuador) ECU	Miller Bolaños (to (Ecuador) Emelec)

=== Shenzhen ===
In:

No.	Pos.	Nation	Player
-	DF	(China) CHN	Wang Peng (loan return from Cangzhou Mighty Lions)
-	DF	(China) CHN	Chen Guoliang (loan return from Liaoning Shenyang Urban)
-	DF	(China) CHN	Zhou Xin (loan return from Suzhou Dongwu)
-	FW	(China) CHN	Wang Chengkuai (loan return from Zibo Cuju)
-	MF	(Colombia) COL	Juan Fernando Quintero (loan return from (Argentina) River Plate)

Out:

No.	Pos.	Nation	Player
-	MF	(Colombia) COL	Juan Fernando Quintero (to (Colombia) Atlético Junior)

=== Tianjin Jinmen Tiger ===
In:

No.	Pos.	Nation	Player
-	DF	(China) CHN	Zu Pengchao (loan return from Nanjing City)

Out:

No.	Pos.	Nation	Player
4	DF	(China) CHN	Yang Fan (loan return to Beijing Guoan)
27	DF	(China) CHN	Zhang Wei (loan return to Shanghai Port)

=== Wuhan Three Towns ===
In:

No.	Pos.	Nation	Player
-	DF	(China) CHN	Wang Xingqiang (loan return from Qingdao Youth Island)
-	MF	(China) CHN	Abduhelil Osmanjan (loan return from Jiangxi Dark Horse Junior)

Out:

No.	Pos.	Nation	Player
13	FW	(Brazil) BRA	Marcão (to (Saudi Arabia) Al Ahli)
37	MF	(China) CHN	Xu Haoyang (loan return to Shanghai Shenhua)

=== Zhejiang ===
In:

No.	Pos.	Nation	Player
-	MF	(Gabon) GAB	Alexander N'Doumbou (from Shanghai Shenhua)
-	MF	(China) CHN	Li Tixiang (from Guangzhou City)
-	FW	(Ivory Coast) CIV	Jean Evrard Kouassi (from (Turkey) Trabzonspor)

Out:

No.	Pos.	Nation	Player
10	FW	(Brazil) BRA	Matheus (Released)

== League One ==
=== Beijing BSU ===
In:

No.	Pos.	Nation	Player

Out:

No.	Pos.	Nation	Player
19	MF	(China) CHN	Zheng Bofan (loan return to Dalian Pro)

=== Dandong Tengyue ===
In:

No.	Pos.	Nation	Player

Out:

No.	Pos.	Nation	Player
19	MF	(China) CHN	Gao Haisheng (loan return to Zibo Cuju)
36	MF	(China) CHN	Li Yingjian (loan return to Zibo Cuju)

=== Guangxi Pingguo Haliao ===
In:

No.	Pos.	Nation	Player
-	GK	(China) CHN	Zhao Yongxi (loan return from Jiangxi Dark Horse Junior)
-	FW	(China) CHN	Lü Weichen (loan return from Jiangxi Dark Horse Junior)
-	MF	(China) CHN	Zhang Muzi (loan return from Jiangxi Dark Horse Junior)
-	GK	(China) CHN	Liang Junjie (loan return from Jiangxi Dark Horse Junior)
-	DF	(China) CHN	Zulpikar Turdi (loan return from Jiangxi Dark Horse Junior)
-	FW	(China) CHN	Qin Zhiyuan (loan return from Jiangxi Dark Horse Junior)
-	DF	(China) CHN	Alimjan Ablet (loan return from Jiangxi Dark Horse Junior)
-	GK	(China) CHN	Enwer Yusup (loan return from Jiangxi Dark Horse Junior)
-	MF	(China) CHN	Chen Zhinan (loan return from Jiangxi Dark Horse Junior)
-	DF	(China) CHN	Chen Xiefeng (loan return from Jiangxi Dark Horse Junior)
-	DF	(China) CHN	Chen Wuhui (loan return from Jiangxi Dark Horse Junior)
-	DF	(China) CHN	Jiang Xianshan (loan return from Jiangxi Dark Horse Junior)
-	MF	(China) CHN	Cai Zhijie (loan return from Jiangxi Dark Horse Junior)
-	DF	(China) CHN	Wang Luxiang (loan return from Jiangxi Dark Horse Junior)
-	FW	(China) CHN	Yu Haoyang (loan return from Jiangxi Dark Horse Junior)
-	MF	(China) CHN	Huang Haoxiang (loan return from Jiangxi Dark Horse Junior)

Out:

No.	Pos.	Nation	Player
2	DF	(China) CHN	Xu Wu (loan return to Sichuan Jiuniu)
4	DF	(China) CHN	Zhu Mingxin (loan return to Changchun Yatai)
24	MF	(China) CHN	Memet-Abdulla Ezmat (loan return to Nantong Zhiyun)
25	FW	(China) CHN	Li Boxi (loan return to Beijing Guoan)
26	MF	(China) CHN	Jiang Wenhao (loan return to Beijing Guoan)
31	MF	(China) CHN	Tao Yuan (loan return to Sichuan Jiuniu)
34	MF	(China) CHN	Lü Pin (loan return to Shanghai Shenhua)
35	DF	(China) CHN	Chen Fangzhou (loan return to Sichuan Jiuniu)
36	FW	(China) CHN	Leng Jixuan (loan return to Beijing Guoan)
38	MF	(China) CHN	Anwar Memet-Ali (loan return to Cangzhou Mighty Lions)
39	MF	(China) CHN	Ötkür Hesen (loan return to Sichuan Jiuniu)

=== Guangzhou ===
In:

No.	Pos.	Nation	Player
-	FW	(China) CHN	Parmanjan Kyum (loan return from Henan Songshan Longmen)
-	DF	(China) CHN	Liang Peiwen (loan return from Heilongjiang Ice City)
-	MF	(China) CHN	Yang Shifu (loan return from Inner Mongolia Caoshangfei)
-	MF	(China) CHN	Chen Zhengfeng (loan return from Dongguan United)
-	MF	(China) CHN	Wu Yuchen (loan return from Dongguan United)
-	DF	(China) CHN	Zhang Zhihao (loan return from Jiangxi Dark Horse Junior)
-	DF	(China) CHN	Zhou Pinxin (loan return from Jiangxi Dark Horse Junior)
-	DF	(China) CHN	Zhou Tiancheng (loan return from Jiangxi Dark Horse Junior)
-	DF	(South Korea) KOR	Park Ji-soo (loan return from (South Korea) Suwon FC)

Out:

No.	Pos.	Nation	Player
5	DF	(China) CHN	Wu Shaocong (to (Turkey) İstanbul Başakşehir)
-	DF	(South Korea) KOR	Park Ji-soo (Released)

=== Hebei ===
In:

No.	Pos.	Nation	Player
-	DF	(Bosnia and Herzegovina) BIH	Samir Memišević (loan return from Beijing Guoan)
-	DF	(China) CHN	Ma Bokang (loan return from Xinjiang Tianshan Leopard)
-	MF	(China) CHN	Merdanjan Abduklim (loan return from Qingdao Youth Island)
-	MF	(China) CHN	Yang Shaochen (loan return from Yanbian Longding)

Out:

No.	Pos.	Nation	Player
-	DF	(Bosnia and Herzegovina) BIH	Samir Memišević (to (United Arab Emirates) Al-Nasr)

=== Heilongjiang Ice City ===
In:

No.	Pos.	Nation	Player

Out:

No.	Pos.	Nation	Player
2	MF	(China) CHN	Zhang Yujie (loan return to Kunshan)
22	MF	(China) CHN	Zhu Jiaxuan (loan return to Dalian Pro)
23	MF	(China) CHN	Cheng Xianfeng (loan return to Kunshan)
34	MF	(China) CHN	Sun Qinhan (loan return to Shanghai Shenhua)
37	FW	(China) CHN	Song Runtong (loan return to Shanghai Shenhua)
40	DF	(China) CHN	Wang Yongxin (loan return to Suzhou Dongwu)
42	DF	(China) CHN	Liang Peiwen (loan return to Guangzhou)

=== Jiangxi Beidamen ===
In:

No.	Pos.	Nation	Player

Out:

No.	Pos.	Nation	Player
10	FW	(Brazil) BRA	Gileard (to (Brazil) Maranhão)

=== Jinan Xingzhou ===
In:

No.	Pos.	Nation	Player
-	MF	(China) CHN	Zhang Zishuai (loan return from Qingdao Red Lions)

Out:

No.	Pos.	Nation	Player

=== Liaoning Shenyang Urban ===
In:

No.	Pos.	Nation	Player

Out:

No.	Pos.	Nation	Player
2	DF	(China) CHN	Chen Guoliang (loan return to Shenzhen)
7	MF	(China) CHN	Liu Ziming (loan return to Cangzhou Mighty Lions)
28	MF	(China) CHN	Chen Rong (loan return to Dalian Pro)
37	MF	(China) CHN	Yang Lei (loan return to Sichuan Jiuniu)
42	DF	(China) CHN	Liu Weicheng (loan return to Qingdao Hainiu)
43	FW	(China) CHN	Xiao Zhi (loan return to Qingdao Hainiu)
44	MF	(China) CHN	Wang Kai (loan return to Wuhan Jiangcheng)

=== Nanjing City ===
In:

No.	Pos.	Nation	Player

Out:

No.	Pos.	Nation	Player
10	FW	(China) CHN	Huang Zhenfei (loan return to Shanghai Port)
30	DF	(China) CHN	Zu Pengchao (loan return to Tianjin Jinmen Tiger)

=== Qingdao Youth Island ===
In:

No.	Pos.	Nation	Player
-	DF	(China) CHN	Li Yueming (loan return from Shijiazhuang Gongfu)
-	DF	(China) CHN	Fang Xinfeng (loan return from Qingdao Red Lions)

Out:

No.	Pos.	Nation	Player
15	MF	(China) CHN	Merdanjan Abduklim (loan return to Hebei)
26	DF	(China) CHN	Su Shihao (loan return to Shanghai Shenhua)
34	DF	(China) CHN	Wang Xingqiang (loan return to Wuhan Three Towns)
40	FW	(China) CHN	Lu Yongtao (loan return to Shandong Taishan)
43	MF	(China) CHN	Xie Longfei (loan return to Beijing Guoan)

=== Shaanxi Chang'an Athletic ===
In:

No.	Pos.	Nation	Player

Out:

No.	Pos.	Nation	Player
2	DF	(China) CHN	Zhang Sijie (loan return to Meizhou Hakka)
11	FW	(China) CHN	Dong Xuesheng (loan return to Wuhan Yangtze River)
22	MF	(China) CHN	He Xin (loan return to Chengdu Rongcheng)
29	MF	(China) CHN	Liu Chaoyang (loan return to Shandong Taishan)
30	FW	(China) CHN	Zhang Jiansheng (loan return to Dalian Pro)
36	MF	(China) CHN	Chen Xing (loan return to Meizhou Hakka)
38	MF	(China) CHN	Hu Mingtian (loan return to Chengdu Rongcheng)

=== Shanghai Jiading Huilong ===
In:

No.	Pos.	Nation	Player

Out:

No.	Pos.	Nation	Player
22	MF	(China) CHN	Wu Zhuangfei (loan return to Chengdu Rongcheng)

=== Shijiazhuang Gongfu ===
In:

No.	Pos.	Nation	Player
-	MF	(China) CHN	Liu Yijiang (loan return from Hunan Billows)

Out:

No.	Pos.	Nation	Player
9	MF	(China) CHN	Nan Xiaoheng (loan return to Sichuan Jiuniu)
24	DF	(China) CHN	Luo Xin (loan return to Chengdu Rongcheng)
33	MF	(China) CHN	Wang Song (to Nantong Zhiyun)
36	DF	(China) CHN	Zhao Shuhao (loan return to Nantong Zhiyun)
44	DF	(China) CHN	Li Yueming (loan return to Qingdao Youth Island)

=== Sichuan Jiuniu ===
In:

No.	Pos.	Nation	Player
-	DF	(China) CHN	Xu Wu (loan return from Guangxi Pingguo Haliao)
-	MF	(China) CHN	Tao Yuan (loan return from Guangxi Pingguo Haliao)
-	DF	(China) CHN	Chen Fangzhou (loan return from Guangxi Pingguo Haliao)
-	MF	(China) CHN	Ötkür Hesen (loan return from Guangxi Pingguo Haliao)
-	MF	(China) CHN	Yang Lei (loan return from Liaoning Shenyang Urban)
-	MF	(China) CHN	Nan Xiaoheng (loan return from Shijiazhuang Gongfu)
-	MF	(China) CHN	Li Endian (loan return from Zibo Cuju)

Out:

No.	Pos.	Nation	Player
13	FW	(China) CHN	Ma Xiaolei (loan return to Chengdu Rongcheng)

=== Suzhou Dongwu ===
In:

No.	Pos.	Nation	Player
-	DF	(China) CHN	Wang Yongxin (loan return from Heilongjiang Ice City)
-	MF	(China) CHN	Hu Haoyue (loan return from Hubei Istar)

Out:

No.	Pos.	Nation	Player
7	DF	(China) CHN	Wu Lei (loan return to Shandong Taishan)
8	MF	(China) CHN	Yu Longyun (loan return to Hubei Istar)
25	GK	(China) CHN	Guo Jiawei (loan return to Hubei Istar)
29	DF	(China) CHN	Zhou Xin (loan return to Shenzhen)

=== Yanbian Longding ===
In:

No.	Pos.	Nation	Player

Out:

No.	Pos.	Nation	Player
15	MF	(China) CHN	Yang Shaochen (loan return to Hebei)
33	DF	(China) CHN	Wang Peng (loan return to Cangzhou Mighty Lions)

=== Zibo Cuju ===
In:

No.	Pos.	Nation	Player
-	GK	(China) CHN	Gu Junjie (loan return from Xinjiang Tianshan Leopard)
-	MF	(China) CHN	Gao Haisheng (loan return from Dandong Tengyue)
-	MF	(China) CHN	Li Yingjian (loan return from Dandong Tengyue)
-	MF	(China) CHN	Yu Zeping (loan return from Inner Mongolia Caoshangfei)

Out:

No.	Pos.	Nation	Player
1	GK	(China) CHN	Li Xuebo (loan return to Dalian Pro)
2	FW	(China) CHN	Wang Chengkuai (loan return to Shenzhen)
4	DF	(China) CHN	Yang Pengju (loan return to Dalian Pro)
14	MF	(China) CHN	Zhang Shuai (loan return to Meizhou Hakka)
19	MF	(China) CHN	Tang Miao (loan return to Chengdu Rongcheng)
21	MF	(China) CHN	Zhang Yuanshu (loan return to Shandong Taishan)
31	FW	(China) CHN	Du Wenxiang (loan return to Qingdao Hainiu)
42	FW	(China) CHN	Hu Ming (loan return to Qingdao Hainiu)
43	MF	(China) CHN	Li Endian (loan return to Sichuan Jiuniu)
45	MF	(China) CHN	Chen Zeng (loan return to Cangzhou Mighty Lions)

== League Two ==
=== Beijing BIT ===
In:

No.	Pos.	Nation	Player

Out:

No.	Pos.	Nation	Player

=== Chongqing Tongliangloong ===
In:

No.	Pos.	Nation	Player

Out:

No.	Pos.	Nation	Player

=== Dalian Duxing ===
In:

No.	Pos.	Nation	Player

Out:

No.	Pos.	Nation	Player

=== Dongguan United ===
In:

No.	Pos.	Nation	Player

Out:

No.	Pos.	Nation	Player
42	MF	(China) CHN	Chen Zhengfeng (loan return to Guangzhou)
51	MF	(China) CHN	Wu Yuchen (loan return to Guangzhou)

=== Fuzhou Hengxing ===
In:

No.	Pos.	Nation	Player

Out:

No.	Pos.	Nation	Player

=== Guangxi Lanhang ===
In:

No.	Pos.	Nation	Player

Out:

No.	Pos.	Nation	Player

=== Hainan Star ===
In:

No.	Pos.	Nation	Player

Out:

No.	Pos.	Nation	Player

=== Hubei Istar ===
In:

No.	Pos.	Nation	Player
-	MF	(China) CHN	Ahmat Tursunjan (loan return from Xinjiang Tianshan Leopard)
-	MF	(China) CHN	Yu Longyun (loan return from Suzhou Dongwu)
-	GK	(China) CHN	Guo Jiawei (loan return from Suzhou Dongwu)

Out:

No.	Pos.	Nation	Player
66	MF	(China) CHN	Hu Haoyue (loan return to Suzhou Dongwu)

=== Hunan Billows ===
In:

No.	Pos.	Nation	Player

Out:

No.	Pos.	Nation	Player

=== Jiangxi Dark Horse Junior ===
In:

No.	Pos.	Nation	Player

Out:

No.	Pos.	Nation	Player
1	GK	(China) CHN	Zhao Yongxi (loan return to Guangxi Pingguo Haliao)
6	MF	(China) CHN	Liu Ruicheng (loan return to Kunshan)
7	FW	(China) CHN	Zhang Aokai (loan return to Cangzhou Mighty Lions)
11	FW	(China) CHN	Lü Weichen (loan return to Guangxi Pingguo Haliao)
13	MF	(China) CHN	Zhang Muzi (loan return to Guangxi Pingguo Haliao)
41	DF	(China) CHN	Ou Xueqian (loan return to Kunshan)
42	GK	(China) CHN	Liang Junjie (loan return to Guangxi Pingguo Haliao)
43	MF	(China) CHN	Lin Zehao (loan return to Kunshan)
44	DF	(China) CHN	Zulpikar Turdi (loan return to Guangxi Pingguo Haliao)
47	FW	(China) CHN	Qin Zhiyuan (loan return to Guangxi Pingguo Haliao)
48	DF	(China) CHN	Alimjan Ablet (loan return to Guangxi Pingguo Haliao)
49	GK	(China) CHN	Enwer Yusup (loan return to Guangxi Pingguo Haliao)
50	MF	(China) CHN	Chen Zhinan (loan return to Guangxi Pingguo Haliao)
51	DF	(China) CHN	Zhang Zhihao (loan return to Guangzhou)
52	DF	(China) CHN	Chen Xiefeng (loan return to Guangxi Pingguo Haliao)
53	DF	(China) CHN	Zhou Pinxin (loan return to Guangzhou)
55	DF	(China) CHN	Chen Wuhui (loan return to Guangxi Pingguo Haliao)
56	DF	(China) CHN	Jiang Xianshan (loan return to Guangxi Pingguo Haliao)
57	MF	(China) CHN	Cai Zhijie (loan return to Guangxi Pingguo Haliao)
58	DF	(China) CHN	Wang Luxiang (loan return to Guangxi Pingguo Haliao)
59	FW	(China) CHN	Yu Haoyang (loan return to Guangxi Pingguo Haliao)
60	MF	(China) CHN	Huang Haoxiang (loan return to Guangxi Pingguo Haliao)
61	MF	(China) CHN	Abduhelil Osmanjan (loan return to Wuhan Three Towns)
68	DF	(China) CHN	Zhou Tiancheng (loan return to Guangzhou)

=== Nantong Haimen Codion ===
In:

No.	Pos.	Nation	Player

Out:

No.	Pos.	Nation	Player

=== Qingdao Red Lions ===
In:

No.	Pos.	Nation	Player

Out:

No.	Pos.	Nation	Player
7	FW	(China) CHN	Zhou Baolin (loan return to Qingdao Hainiu)
13	FW	(China) CHN	Pang Chengtai (loan return to Qingdao Hainiu)
28	DF	(China) CHN	Fang Xinfeng (loan return to Qingdao Youth Island)
55	MF	(China) CHN	Zhang Zishuai (loan return to Jinan Xingzhou)

=== Quanzhou Yassin ===
In:

No.	Pos.	Nation	Player

Out:

No.	Pos.	Nation	Player
23	MF	(China) CHN	Zhao Wenzhi (loan return to Chengdu Rongcheng)
25	MF	(China) CHN	Wang Chaolong (loan return to Chengdu Rongcheng)
28	FW	(China) CHN	Cheng Zuhao (loan return to Chengdu Rongcheng)

=== Shaoxing Shangyu Pterosaur ===
In:

No.	Pos.	Nation	Player

Out:

No.	Pos.	Nation	Player

=== Tai'an Tiankuang ===
In:

No.	Pos.	Nation	Player

Out:

No.	Pos.	Nation	Player

=== Wuhan Jiangcheng ===
In:

No.	Pos.	Nation	Player
-	MF	(China) CHN	Wang Kai (loan return from Liaoning Shenyang Urban)

Out:

No.	Pos.	Nation	Player

=== Wuxi Wugo ===
In:

No.	Pos.	Nation	Player

Out:

No.	Pos.	Nation	Player

=== Yuxi Yukun ===
In:

No.	Pos.	Nation	Player

Out:

No.	Pos.	Nation	Player

=== Zhuhai Qin'ao ===
In:

No.	Pos.	Nation	Player

Out:

No.	Pos.	Nation	Player

=== Zibo Qisheng ===
In:

No.	Pos.	Nation	Player

Out:

No.	Pos.	Nation	Player

== Dissolved ==
=== Wuhan Yangtze River ===
In:

No.	Pos.	Nation	Player
-	FW	(China) CHN	Dong Xuesheng (loan return from Shaanxi Chang'an Athletic)

Out:

No.	Pos.	Nation	Player
1	GK	(China) CHN	Wang Zhifeng (Released)
2	DF	(China) CHN	Li Peng (Released)
3	DF	(China) CHN	Han Xuan (Released)
5	DF	(Brazil) BRA	Bruno Viana (loan return to (Portugal) Braga)
6	DF	(China) CHN	Li Chao (Released)
7	MF	(China) CHN	Luo Yi (Released)
10	FW	(Costa Rica) CRC	Felicio Brown Forbes (Released)
11	MF	(China) CHN	Hu Rentian (Released)
12	DF	(China) CHN	Liu Shangkun (Released)
15	DF	(China) CHN	Ming Tian (Released)
16	MF	(Montenegro) MNE	Asmir Kajević (Released)
17	MF	(China) CHN	Zhang Huajun (Released)
18	MF	(China) CHN	Nie Aoshuang (Released)
19	FW	(China) CHN	Hu Jinghang (Released)
20	MF	(China) CHN	Li Hang (Released)
21	FW	(China) CHN	Wang Jingbin (Released)
22	GK	(China) CHN	Zhang Zhenqiang (Released)
23	GK	(China) CHN	Gao Xiang (Released)
24	MF	(China) CHN	Hu Jiali (Released)
26	MF	(China) CHN	Liu Yun (Released)
28	DF	(China) CHN	Xu Dong (Released)
29	FW	(China) CHN	Wen Da (Released)
31	DF	(China) CHN	Cao Xiaoyi (Released)
32	DF	(China) CHN	Chen Yuhao (Released)
33	MF	(China) CHN	Ye Chongqiu (Released)
35	DF	(China) CHN	Ren Kangkang (Released)
36	MF	(China) CHN	Huang Xuheng (Released)
37	FW	(China) CHN	Liu Junxian (Released)
39	DF	(China) CHN	Nihat Nihmat (Released)
40	MF	(China) CHN	Pi Ziyang (Released)
42	DF	(China) CHN	Li Da (Released)
-	FW	(China) CHN	Dong Xuesheng (Released)

=== Xinjiang Tianshan Leopard ===
In:

No.	Pos.	Nation	Player

Out:

No.	Pos.	Nation	Player
3	DF	(China) CHN	Li Jingrun (Released)
4	DF	(China) CHN	Kaster Hurman (Released)
6	DF	(China) CHN	Mijit Arapat (Released)
7	FW	(China) CHN	Minem Mehmudjan (Released)
8	MF	(China) CHN	Ababekri Erkin (Released)
10	FW	(China) CHN	Shi Jian (Released)
12	DF	(China) CHN	Ma Chao (Released)
14	DF	(China) CHN	Mehmud Abdukerem (Released)
15	MF	(China) CHN	Ahmat Tursunjan (loan return to Hubei Istar)
16	FW	(China) CHN	Abdulla Abduwal (Released)
17	MF	(China) CHN	Huang Wenzhuo (Released)
18	MF	(China) CHN	Rehimjan Ekber (Released)
20	MF	(China) CHN	Kamiran Halimurat (Released)
21	DF	(China) CHN	Ma Bokang (loan return to Hebei)
22	DF	(China) CHN	Bebet Murat (Released)
24	FW	(China) CHN	Elizat Abdureshit (Released)
25	MF	(China) CHN	Qaharman Abdukerim (Released)
26	FW	(China) CHN	Elbug Chagtsel (Released)
28	GK	(China) CHN	Ripat Ablitip (Released)
29	MF	(China) CHN	Ilyas Ilhar (Released)
32	MF	(China) CHN	Wang Zhuo (Released)
33	GK	(China) CHN	Gu Junjie (loan return to Zibo Cuju)
35	FW	(China) CHN	Han Yi (Released)
36	MF	(China) CHN	Wang Shixin (Released)
37	DF	(Cameroon) CMR	Franck Kouamejo (Released)
39	FW	(China) CHN	Zhao Xuebin (loan return to Cangzhou Mighty Lions)
40	MF	(China) CHN	Bari Mamatil (Released)
41	MF	(China) CHN	Qeysar Abduheni (Released)
42	GK	(China) CHN	Halmurat Semi (Released)
43	MF	(China) CHN	Zhang Shengbin (Released)
44	MF	(China) CHN	Danyar Musajan (Released)
45	DF	(Serbia) SRB	Branko Jovanović (Released)
