= List of Chinese football transfers summer 2018 =

This is a list of Chinese football transfers for the 2018 season summer transfer window. It opened on 18 June 2018 and closed on 13 July 2018.

== Super League ==
=== Beijing Renhe ===
In:

No.	Pos.	Nation	Player
7	FW	KEN	Ayub Masika (loan return from Heilongjiang Lava Spring)
39	FW	SEN	Makhete Diop (from (United Arab Emirates) Shabab Al Ahli)
-	DF	CHN	Xu Jiajun (from (Belgium) Roeselare)

Out:

No.	Pos.	Nation	Player
10	MF	BRA	Ivo (to Henan Jianye)
17	FW	ECU	Jaime Ayoví (to (United Arab Emirates) Shabab Al Ahli)
19	MF	CHN	Chen Liming (loan to Heilongjiang Lava Spring)
48	MF	CHN	Zhang Hao (loan to (Belgium) Standard Liège)
-	DF	CHN	Xu Jiajun (loan to Yanbian Beiguo)

=== Beijing Sinobo Guoan ===
In:

No.	Pos.	Nation	Player
2	DF	CHN	Zheng Yiming (from (Norway) Stabæk)
61	MF	CHN	Leng Jixuan (Free Agent)
62	DF	CHN	Liu Jishen (from Shanghai SIPG)
63	DF	CHN	Aysan Kadir (from Tianjin TEDA)
64	MF	CHN	Nebijan Muhmet (Free Agent)

Out:

No.	Pos.	Nation	Player
14	DF	CHN	Jin Pengxiang (loan to Dalian Yifang)
35	GK	CHN	Zhang Yan (to Jiangsu Suning)
41	FW	CHN	Zhang Chiming (to Tianjin TEDA)
46	MF	CHN	Tang Hai (to Meizhou Hakka )
-	DF	CHN	Sheng Pengfei (loan to Taizhou Yuanda)
-	DF	CHN	Cai Peilei (to Guizhou Hengfeng)

=== Changchun Yatai ===
In:

No.	Pos.	Nation	Player
11	MF	POL	Adrian Mierzejewski (from (Australia) Sydney FC)
38	MF	CHN	Wang Shouting (loan from Shanghai Greenland Shenhua)
39	DF	SRB	Nemanja Pejčinović (from (Russia) Lokomotiv Moscow)

Out:

No.	Pos.	Nation	Player
5	DF	UZB	Anzur Ismailov (to (Uzbekistan) Lokomotiv Tashkent)
7	MF	BRA	Marinho (to (Brazil) Grêmio)
22	MF	CHN	Li Shang (loan to Sichuan Jiuniu)
45	MF	CHN	Wang Jinliang (loan to Sichuan Jiuniu)
-	MF	CHN	Li Xiaoting (to Sichuan Longfor)

=== Chongqing Dangdai Lifan ===
In:

No.	Pos.	Nation	Player
34	FW	BRA	Sebá (loan from (Greece) Olympiacos)
61	FW	CHN	Wen Tianpeng (from Shenyang Dongjin)
-	DF	CRO	Goran Milović (loan return from (Croatia) NK Osijek)

Out:

No.	Pos.	Nation	Player
15	MF	ARG	Nicolás Aguirre (to (Spain) Granada)
-	DF	CRO	Goran Milović (to (Belgium) KV Oostende)

=== Dalian Yifang ===
In:

No.	Pos.	Nation	Player
16	MF	CHN	Qin Sheng (loan from Shanghai Greenland Shenhua)
25	DF	CHN	Jin Pengxiang (loan from Beijing Sinobo Guoan)
28	FW	COL	Duvier Riascos (from (Brazil) Vasco da Gama)

Out:

No.	Pos.	Nation	Player
2	DF	CHN	Wang Wanpeng (loan to Dalian Transcendence)
5	DF	POR	José Fonte (to (France) Lille)
-	MF	CHN	Li Zhendong (to Qiqihaer Zhongjian Bituminous Concrete)

=== Guangzhou Evergrande Taobao ===
In:

No.	Pos.	Nation	Player
9	MF	BRA	Paulinho (loan from (Spain) Barcelona)
24	MF	BRA	Talisca (loan from (Portugal) Benfica)
-	DF	CHN	Imran Kurban (loan return from (Czech Republic) FK Mohelnice)
-	MF	CHN	Zheng Jie (loan return from (France) AJ Auxerre)

Out:

No.	Pos.	Nation	Player
8	MF	SRB	Nemanja Gudelj (loan to (Portugal) Sporting CP)
12	DF	CHN	Wang Shangyuan (loan to Henan Jianye)
-	FW	CHN	Zeng Qingshen (to (Denmark) Vejle Boldklub)
-	MF	CHN	Zhang Aokai (to (Spain) Espanyol)
-	MF	CHN	Xu Li'ao (to Zibo Sunday)
-	GK	CHN	Zhao Tianci (to (Japan) YSCC Yokohama)
-	FW	COL	Jackson Martínez (loan to (Portugal) Portimonense)

=== Guangzhou R&F ===
In:

No.	Pos.	Nation	Player
3	DF	SRB	Duško Tošić (from (Turkey) Beşiktaş)
16	FW	CHN	Li Rui (loan return from (Hong Kong) R&F)
27	MF	CHN	Zhang Jiajie (loan return from (Hong Kong) R&F)
30	MF	CHN	Wang Peng (loan from (Portugal) Gondomar)
47	MF	CHN	Pan Jiajun (from Henan Jianye)
48	GK	CHN	Chen Zirong (loan return from (Hong Kong) R&F)
52	MF	CHN	Yao Jialin (Free Agent)
56	MF	CHN	Deng Yanlin (loan return from (Hong Kong) R&F)
57	MF	CHN	Chen Fuhai (loan return from (Hong Kong) R&F)
58	DF	CHN	Liang Yongfeng (loan return from (Hong Kong) R&F)
59	MF	HKG	Tan Chun Lok (from (Hong Kong) Tai Po)
-	MF	CHN	He Zilin (loan return from (Hong Kong) R&F)
-	DF	CHN	Wang Erduo (loan return from (Hong Kong) R&F)
-	FW	BRA	Bruninho (loan return from (Hong Kong) R&F)

Out:

No.	Pos.	Nation	Player
14	FW	SRB	Marko Perović (Released)
48	GK	CHN	Chen Zirong (loan to (Hong Kong) R&F)
57	MF	CHN	Chen Fuhai (loan to (Hong Kong) R&F)
58	DF	CHN	Liang Yongfeng (loan to (Hong Kong) R&F)
59	MF	HKG	Tan Chun Lok (loan to (Hong Kong) R&F)
-	MF	CHN	Ning An (loan to (Hong Kong) R&F)

=== Guizhou Hengfeng ===
In:

No.	Pos.	Nation	Player
37	DF	CHN	Cai Peilei (from Beijing Sinobo Guoan)
39	DF	CIV	Kévin Boli (from (Romania) CFR Cluj)
59	FW	KEN	Michael Olunga (loan return from (Spain) Girona)

Out:

No.	Pos.	Nation	Player
10	MF	NED	Tjaronn Chery (loan to (Turkey) Kayserispor)
48	FW	CHN	Pang Zhiquan (to Shaanxi Chang'an Athletic)
59	FW	KEN	Michael Olunga (to (Japan) Kashiwa Reysol)

=== Hebei China Fortune ===
In:

No.	Pos.	Nation	Player
25	FW	MAR	Ayoub El Kaabi (from (Morocco) RS Berkane)
61	MF	CHN	Ren Wei (from Shanghai SIPG)
-	DF	TUR	Ersan Gülüm (loan return from (Australia) Adelaide United)
-	MF	COD	Gaël Kakuta (loan return from (France) Amiens)

Out:

No.	Pos.	Nation	Player
27	FW	CIV	Gervinho (to (Italy) Parma)
-	MF	COD	Gaël Kakuta (to (Spain) Rayo Vallecano)

=== Henan Jianye ===
In:

No.	Pos.	Nation	Player
26	DF	CHN	Wang Shangyuan (loan from Guangzhou Evergrande Taobao)
29	MF	BRA	Ivo (from Beijing Renhe)
37	FW	BRA	Fernando Karanga (from (Bulgaria) CSKA Sofia)
39	FW	MAS	Yap Wei Xuan (loan from Shanghai SIPG)
64	FW	CHN	Wu Xiaobo (from Shandong Luneng Taishan)
65	GK	CHN	Niu Ben (from Shenzhen)
-	DF	GNB	Eddi Gomes (loan return from (Iceland) FH)
-	FW	CHN	Zhang Shuai (loan return from Shijiazhuang Ever Bright)

Out:

No.	Pos.	Nation	Player
8	FW	POR	Orlando Sá (to (Belgium) Standard Liège)
12	GK	CHN	Wei Peng (loan to Fujian Tianxin)
14	DF	ESP	Cala (to (Spain) Las Palmas)
53	MF	CHN	Pan Jiajun (to Guangzhou R&F)
-	DF	GNB	Eddi Gomes (loan to (Iceland) FH)
-	FW	CHN	Zhang Shuai (to Shijiazhuang Ever Bright)

=== Jiangsu Suning ===
In:

No.	Pos.	Nation	Player
9	FW	ITA	Éder (from (Italy) Inter Milan)
19	GK	CHN	Zhang Yan (from Beijing Sinobo Guoan)
61	DF	AUS	Trent Sainsbury (loan return from (Switzerland) Grasshopper)
-	FW	COL	Roger Martínez (loan return from (Spain) Villarreal)

Out:

No.	Pos.	Nation	Player
38	FW	GHA	Richmond Boakye (to (Serbia) Red Star Belgrade)
53	MF	CHN	Zhong Yi (to Fujian Tianxin)
61	DF	AUS	Trent Sainsbury (to (Netherlands) PSV Eindhoven)
-	FW	COL	Roger Martínez (to (Mexico) América)

=== Shandong Luneng Taishan ===
In:

No.	Pos.	Nation	Player
32	FW	BRA	Róger Guedes (loan from (Brazil) Palmeiras)
62	GK	CHN	Zhou Yuchen (loan return from (Hong Kong) R&F)
-	MF	POR	Pedro Delgado (from (Portugal) Sporting CP B)

Out:

No.	Pos.	Nation	Player
18	FW	SEN	Papiss Cissé (to (Turkey) Alanyaspor)
37	DF	CHN	Wang Jiong (loan to Sichuan Jiuniu)
41	MF	CHN	Zhang Chen (loan to Sichuan Jiuniu)
48	DF	CHN	Yu Chenglei (loan to Sichuan Jiuniu)
52	FW	CHN	Wu Xiaobo (to Henan Jianye)
62	GK	CHN	Zhou Yuchen (loan to (Hong Kong) R&F)
-	MF	CHN	Liu Li (loan to Sichuan Jiuniu)
-	MF	CHN	He Tongshuai (loan to Zibo Sunday)
-	MF	CHN	Liu Changqi (loan to Zibo Sunday)
-	MF	CHN	Xu Anbang (loan to Zibo Sunday)
-	MF	CHN	Sun Rui (loan to Zibo Sunday)
-	MF	CHN	Sun Yi (loan to Zibo Sunday)
-	FW	CHN	Ji Shengpan (loan to Zibo Sunday)
-	DF	CHN	Gao Xin (loan to Beijing Enterprises Group)

=== Shanghai Greenland Shenhua ===
In:

No.	Pos.	Nation	Player
9	FW	SEN	Demba Ba (from (Turkey) Göztepe)
-	DF	HKG	Brian Fok (loan return from (Uruguay) Juventud)
-	MF	CHN	Wang Shouting (loan return from Shanghai Shenxin)

Out:

No.	Pos.	Nation	Player
26	MF	CHN	Qin Sheng (loan to Dalian Yifang)
52	DF	CHN	Deng Biao (loan to Xinjiang Tianshan Leopard)
-	DF	HKG	Brian Fok (loan to (Portugal) Académico de Viseu)
-	MF	CHN	Wang Shouting (loan to Changchun Yatai)
-	FW	CHN	Yan Ge (loan to Baotou Nanjiao)

=== Shanghai SIPG ===
In:

No.	Pos.	Nation	Player

Out:

No.	Pos.	Nation	Player
19	FW	CHN	Hu Jinghang (loan to Henan Jianye)
30	FW	CHN	Gao Zhijie (loan to Nantong Zhiyun)
31	MF	CHN	Jiang Zilei (loan to Wuhan Zall)
38	DF	CHN	Wei Lai (loan to Shanghai Shenxin)
-	DF	CHN	Liu Jishen (to Beijing Sinobo Guoan)
-	MF	CHN	Ren Wei (to Hebei China Fortune)
-	MF	CHN	Gong Chunjie (loan to Zhenjiang Huasa)

=== Tianjin Quanjian ===
In:

No.	Pos.	Nation	Player
27	FW	FRA	Anthony Modeste (from (Germany) 1. FC Köln)

Out:

No.	Pos.	Nation	Player
27	FW	FRA	Anthony Modeste (loan return to (Germany) 1. FC Köln)
28	MF	BEL	Axel Witsel (to (Germany) Borussia Dortmund)
60	DF	CHN	Yan Zihao (loan to Jiangsu Yancheng Dingli)

=== Tianjin TEDA ===
In:

No.	Pos.	Nation	Player
36	FW	CHN	Zhang Chiming (from Beijing Sinobo Guoan)
41	GK	CHN	Wang Zelong (from Shenzhen Ledman)
60	FW	CHN	Luan Zhibo (from Shenyang Dongjin)
-	FW	NGA	Brown Ideye (loan return from (Spain) Málaga)

Out:

No.	Pos.	Nation	Player
-	DF	CHN	Aysan Kadir (to Beijing Sinobo Guoan)

== League One ==
=== Beijing Enterprises Group ===
In:

No.	Pos.	Nation	Player
14	DF	CHN	Gao Xin (loan from Shandong Luneng Taishan)

Out:

No.	Pos.	Nation	Player
10	MF	TPE	Chen Hao-wei (Released)
28	MF	CHN	Song Yi (loan to Beijing BIT)

=== Dalian Transcendence ===
In:

No.	Pos.	Nation	Player
5	DF	CHN	Wang Wanpeng (loan from Dalian Yifang)
30	FW	MNE	Admir Adrović (from (Montenegro) Titograd Podgorica)

Out:

No.	Pos.	Nation	Player
14	MF	CHN	Hu Zhaojun (to Zhejiang Yiteng)
43	DF	CHN	Chen Yuhao (to Zhejiang Yiteng)

=== Heilongjiang Lava Spring ===
In:

No.	Pos.	Nation	Player
26	MF	CHN	Chen Liming (loan from Beijing Renhe)
39	FW	BRA	Cassiano (from (Brazil) Paysandu)

Out:

No.	Pos.	Nation	Player
7	FW	KEN	Ayub Masika (loan return to Beijing Renhe)
11	FW	CHN	Wang Ziming (loan to Shenyang Urban)

=== Liaoning FC ===
In:

No.	Pos.	Nation	Player
33	MF	BRA	Gustavo Vagenin (from (Romania) Universitatea Craiova)
36	FW	CHN	Jiang Chenghao (from Shenzhen)
61	MF	CHN	Yang Lianfeng (loan return from Anhui Hefei Guiguan)
-	GK	CHN	Li Zhen (loan return from Anhui Hefei Guiguan)
-	DF	CHN	Chen Fubang (loan return from Anhui Hefei Guiguan)

Out:

No.	Pos.	Nation	Player
12	FW	ZAM	James Chamanga (Retired)

=== Meizhou Hakka ===
In:

No.	Pos.	Nation	Player
61	MF	CHN	Tang Hai (from Beijing Sinobo Guoan)

Out:

No.	Pos.	Nation	Player
21	MF	CHN	Tan Jiajun (loan to Shenzhen Pengcheng)

=== Meizhou Meixian Techand ===
In:

No.	Pos.	Nation	Player
7	FW	BRA	Denilson (from (Cyprus) AEL Limassol)
62	DF	CHN	Zhong Ke (from (Hong Kong) R&F)

Out:

No.	Pos.	Nation	Player
-	GK	CHN	Ban Yong (to Qiqihaer Zhongjian Bituminous Concrete)

=== Nei Mongol Zhongyou ===
In:

No.	Pos.	Nation	Player
72	MF	CHN	Yang Zongyu (from Anhui Hefei Guiguan)

Out:

No.	Pos.	Nation	Player
21	DF	ESP	Martí Crespí (to (India) Delhi Dynamos)

=== Qingdao Huanghai ===
In:

No.	Pos.	Nation	Player
9	FW	BRA	Cléo (from (Portugal) Cova da Piedade)
-	FW	CHN	Wu Jian (from (Spain) C.D. Jumilla)

Out:

No.	Pos.	Nation	Player

=== Shanghai Shenxin ===
In:

No.	Pos.	Nation	Player
33	DF	CHN	Wei Lai (loan from Shanghai SIPG)

Out:

No.	Pos.	Nation	Player
13	MF	CHN	Wang Shouting (loan return to Shanghai Greenland Shenhua)

=== Shenzhen F.C. ===
In:

No.	Pos.	Nation	Player
35	FW	GAM	Pa Dibba (from (Sweden) Hammarby IF)

Out:

No.	Pos.	Nation	Player
14	FW	CMR	Aboubakar Oumarou (to (Saudi Arabia) Al-Qadsiah)
-	FW	CHN	Jiang Chenghao (to Liaoning)
-	GK	CHN	Niu Ben (to Henan Jianye)

=== Shijiazhuang Ever Bright ===
In:

No.	Pos.	Nation	Player
14	FW	VEN	Mario Rondón (from (Romania) Gaz Metan Mediaș)
58	FW	CHN	Zhang Shuai (from Henan Jianye)
61	MF	CHN	Ci Tian (from (Germany) SV Werder Bremen II)
62	DF	CHN	Li Fengyin (from (Portugal) ARC Oleiros)
63	MF	CHN	Chen-Zeng Tailang (from Shenyang Dongjin)
64	GK	CHN	Liu Wei (from Shenyang Dongjin)

Out:

No.	Pos.	Nation	Player
58	FW	CHN	Zhang Shuai (loan return to Henan Jianye)
-	GK	CHN	Wu Yaoshengxuan (to Zhejiang Yiteng)

=== Wuhan Zall ===
In:

No.	Pos.	Nation	Player
37	FW	BRA	Pedro Júnior (loan from (Japan) Kashima Antlers)
-	MF	CHN	Jiang Zilei (loan from Shanghai SIPG)

Out:

No.	Pos.	Nation	Player
24	MF	CHN	Wang Xudong (loan to Jilin Baijia)

=== Xinjiang Tianshan Leopard ===
In:

No.	Pos.	Nation	Player
31	FW	HKG	Paul Ngue (from (Hong Kong) Southern District)
32	DF	CHN	Deng Biao (loan from Shanghai Shenhua)
37	FW	ESP	José Antonio Reyes (from (Spain) Córdoba)
-	GK	CHN	Lu Hantao (from (Spain) Llagostera)

Out:

No.	Pos.	Nation	Player
9	FW	MNE	Petar Orlandić (to (Malta) Birkirkara)

=== Yanbian Funde ===
In:

No.	Pos.	Nation	Player
24	FW	HKG	Alex Akande (from (Hong Kong) Kitchee)
25	FW	COD	Taty Maritu Oscar (from (Democratic Republic of the Congo) New Jack)

Out:

No.	Pos.	Nation	Player
10	FW	BRA	Jair (to (Australia) Newcastle Jets)
37	MF	CHN	Yang Ailong (to (Portugal) Torreense)
48	MF	CHN	Fang Kuimin (to Sichuan Jiuniu)
-	DF	CHN	Li-Qin Dingming (to Jilin Baijia)

=== Zhejiang Greentown ===
In:

No.	Pos.	Nation	Player
35	FW	BRA	Rafael Martins (from (Portugal) Vitória Guimarães)

Out:

No.	Pos.	Nation	Player

=== Zhejiang Yiteng ===
In:

No.	Pos.	Nation	Player
1	GK	CHN	Wu Yaoshengxuan (from Shijiazhuang Ever Bright)
14	MF	CHN	Hu Zhaojun (from Dalian Transcendence)
29	DF	CHN	Chen Yuhao (from Dalian Transcendence)
34	MF	BRA	Rodrigo Paulista (from (Brazil) Bragantino)

Out:

No.	Pos.	Nation	Player

== League Two ==
=== North League ===
==== Baoding Yingli ETS ====
In:

No.	Pos.	Nation	Player
29	MF	CHN	Li Yikai (Free Agent)

Out:

No.	Pos.	Nation	Player
2	MF	CHN	Cong Minhang (to Fujian Tianxin)

==== Baotou Nanjiao ====
In:

No.	Pos.	Nation	Player
3	DF	CHN	Tulajan Turghunjan (Free Agent)
23	MF	CHN	Liu Yafeng (Free Agent)
28	FW	CHN	Yan Ge (loan from Shanghai Greenland Shenhua)
33	DF	CHN	Tamir (Free Agent)
35	DF	CHN	Guo Fulong (Free Agent)

Out:

No.	Pos.	Nation	Player
8	FW	CHN	Almjan Abdugheni (loan return to Yanbian Beiguo)

==== Beijing BIT ====
In:

No.	Pos.	Nation	Player
12	MF	CHN	Song Yi (loan from Beijing Enterprises Group)

Out:

No.	Pos.	Nation	Player

==== Dalian Boyoung ====
In:

No.	Pos.	Nation	Player

Out:

No.	Pos.	Nation	Player
27	FW	CHN	Yang Bing (Released)

==== Hebei Elite ====
In:

No.	Pos.	Nation	Player
-	FW	CHN	Wu Linfeng (loan return from (Brazil) Botafogo)
-	GK	CHN	Chen Chuang (Free agent)

Out:

No.	Pos.	Nation	Player

==== Jiangsu Yancheng Dingli ====
In:

No.	Pos.	Nation	Player
15	DF	CHN	Yan Zihao (loan from Tianjin Quanjian)
27	DF	CHN	Tang Libo (from Shenyang Dongjin)

Out:

No.	Pos.	Nation	Player

==== Jilin Baijia ====
In:

No.	Pos.	Nation	Player
13	GK	CHN	Zou Deyue (from Fujian Tianxin)
20	DF	CHN	Zhang Jiakuo (from Anhui Hefei Guiguan)
22	DF	CHN	Li-Qin Dingming (from Yanbian Funde)
25	MF	CHN	Wang Xudong (loan from Wuhan Zall)

Out:

No.	Pos.	Nation	Player

==== Qingdao Jonoon ====
In:

No.	Pos.	Nation	Player

Out:

No.	Pos.	Nation	Player

==== Shaanxi Chang'an Athletic ====
In:

No.	Pos.	Nation	Player
4	DF	CHN	Zhao Peng (from Anhui Hefei Guiguan)
34	FW	CHN	Pang Zhiquan (from Guizhou Hengfeng)

Out:

No.	Pos.	Nation	Player
2	GK	CHN	Erit Ulam (to Huizhou Huixin)

==== Shenyang Urban ====
In:

No.	Pos.	Nation	Player
12	GK	CHN	Chen Guolong (from Anhui Hefei Guiguan)
23	FW	CHN	Wang Ziming (loan from Heilongjiang Lava Spring)

Out:

No.	Pos.	Nation	Player

==== Yanbian Beiguo ====
In:

No.	Pos.	Nation	Player
7	FW	CHN	Almjan Abdugheni (loan return from Baotou Nanjiao)
9	FW	CHN	Zhang Depeng (loan return from Anhui Hefei Guiguan)
16	FW	CHN	Ablimit Abdurop (Free agent)
20	DF	CHN	Xu Jiajun (loan from Beijing Renhe)
39	MF	CHN	Wu Leitian (Free agent)

Out:

No.	Pos.	Nation	Player

==== Yinchuan Helanshan ====
In:

No.	Pos.	Nation	Player
20	MF	CHN	Chen Zewen (from Anhui Hefei Guiguan)

Out:

No.	Pos.	Nation	Player

==== Zibo Sunday ====
In:

No.	Pos.	Nation	Player
11	MF	CHN	Xu Li'ao (from Guangzhou Evergrande Taobao)
17	MF	CHN	Sun Yi (loan from Shandong Luneng Taishan)
18	MF	CHN	Sun Rui (loan from Shandong Luneng Taishan)
24	MF	CHN	Liu Changqi (loan from Shandong Luneng Taishan)
26	DF	CHN	Si Xiao (Free Agent)
32	MF	CHN	Xu Anbang (loan from Shandong Luneng Taishan)
33	MF	CHN	He Tongshuai (loan from Shandong Luneng Taishan)
37	FW	CHN	Ji Shengpan (loan from Shandong Luneng Taishan)

Out:

No.	Pos.	Nation	Player

=== South League ===
==== Fujian Tianxin ====
In:

No.	Pos.	Nation	Player
12	MF	CHN	Zhong Yi (from Jiangsu Suning)
15	MF	CHN	Ma Tianming (from Shenyang Dongjin)
16	MF	CHN	Yu Songhai (Free agent)
17	MF	CHN	Zhang Mingran (Free agent)
28	MF	CHN	Cong Minhang (from Baoding Yingli ETS)
29	GK	CHN	Wei Peng (loan from Henan Jianye)
31	MF	CHN	Chen Jiashun (from Shenyang Dongjin)
32	DF	CHN	Liu Hexin (Free agent)
37	MF	CHN	Sun Zhengyang (Free agent)
-	MF	CHN	Qin Lei (Free agent)

Out:

No.	Pos.	Nation	Player
11	DF	CHN	Deng Li (Retired)
13	GK	CHN	Zou Deyue (to Jilin Baijia)

==== Hainan Boying ====
In:

No.	Pos.	Nation	Player
9	FW	CHN	Li Changliang (from Anhui Hefei Guiguan)

Out:

No.	Pos.	Nation	Player

==== Hunan Billows ====
In:

No.	Pos.	Nation	Player

Out:

No.	Pos.	Nation	Player

==== Jiangxi Liansheng ====
In:

No.	Pos.	Nation	Player
2	DF	CHN	Zhang Kaixuan (Free agent)
8	MF	CHN	Zhu Zhenghuang (Free agent)
20	MF	CHN	Wang Bojun (from Anhui Hefei Guiguan)
25	DF	CHN	Zhang Sen (Free agent)

Out:

No.	Pos.	Nation	Player

==== Nantong Zhiyun ====
In:

No.	Pos.	Nation	Player
3	DF	CHN	Li Hao (from Anhui Hefei Guiguan)
28	FW	CHN	Gao Zhijie (loan from Shanghai SIPG)

Out:

No.	Pos.	Nation	Player

==== Shanghai Sunfun ====
In:

No.	Pos.	Nation	Player

Out:

No.	Pos.	Nation	Player

==== Shenzhen Pengcheng ====
In:

No.	Pos.	Nation	Player
2	DF	CHN	Sun Wenlong (Free Agent)
9	MF	CHN	Zhang Xu (from Shenyang Dongjin)
10	MF	CHN	Cai Yaohui (Free Agent)
21	MF	CHN	Tan Jiajun (loan from Meizhou Hakka)
22	DF	CHN	Yuan Lin (Free Agent)
28	DF	CHN	Huang Cheng (Free Agent)

Out:

No.	Pos.	Nation	Player

==== Shenzhen Ledman ====
In:

No.	Pos.	Nation	Player
29	MF	CHN	Tan Long (Free agent)

Out:

No.	Pos.	Nation	Player
9	MF	CHN	Han Jiabao (to Sichuan Jiuniu)
22	GK	CHN	Wang Zelong (to Tianjin Teda)

==== Sichuan Jiuniu ====
In:

No.	Pos.	Nation	Player
2	DF	CHN	Wang Jiong (loan from Shandong Luneng Taishan)
9	MF	CHN	Han Jiabao (from Shenzhen Ledman)
12	MF	CHN	Wang Jinliang (loan from Changchun Yatai)
27	MF	CHN	Zhang Chen (loan from Shandong Luneng Taishan)
28	DF	CHN	Qiu Shi (from Anhui Hefei Guiguan)
31	MF	CHN	Liu Li (loan from Shandong Luneng Taishan)
32	DF	CHN	Yu Chenglei (loan from Shandong Luneng Taishan)
37	MF	CHN	Li Shang (loan from Changchun Yatai)
-	MF	CHN	Fang Kuimin (from Yanbian Funde)

Out:

No.	Pos.	Nation	Player

==== Sichuan Longfor ====
In:

No.	Pos.	Nation	Player
26	MF	CHN	Li Xiaoting (from Changchun Yatai)
29	FW	CHN	Yang Zi (Free agent)

Out:

No.	Pos.	Nation	Player

==== Suzhou Dongwu ====
In:

No.	Pos.	Nation	Player
21	MF	CHN	Hamit Shepket (from Shenyang Dongjin)

Out:

No.	Pos.	Nation	Player

==== Yunnan Flying Tigers ====
In:

No.	Pos.	Nation	Player

Out:

No.	Pos.	Nation	Player

==== Zhenjiang Huasa ====
In:

No.	Pos.	Nation	Player
18	DF	CHN	Zhang Tianhan (from Anhui Hefei Guiguan)
30	DF	CHN	Han Chao (Free Agent)
35	MF	CHN	Gong Chunjie (loan from Shanghai SIPG)

Out:

No.	Pos.	Nation	Player

== Dissolved ==
=== Anhui Hefei Guiguan ===
In:

No.	Pos.	Nation	Player

Out:

No.	Pos.	Nation	Player
1	GK	CHN	Chen Guolong (to Shenyang Urban)
3	MF	CHN	Deng Xin (Released)
4	DF	CHN	Zhao Peng (to Shaanxi Chang'an Athletic)
6	FW	CHN	Wang Zhe (Released)
7	MF	CHN	Wang Jun (Released)
8	MF	CHN	Yang Zongyu (to Nei Mongol Zhongyou)
9	FW	CHN	Zhang Depeng (loan return to Yanbian Beiguo)
10	FW	CHN	Li Changliang (to Hainan Boying)
11	MF	CHN	Chen Zewen (to Yinchuan Helanshan)
12	GK	CHN	Li Zhen (loan return to Liaoning FC)
13	DF	CHN	Zhong Kai (Released)
14	DF	CHN	Ren Fan (Released)
15	FW	CHN	Zhu Jianguo (Released)
16	MF	CHN	Wang Bojun (to Jiangxi Liansheng)
17	DF	CHN	Qiu Shi (to Sichuan Jiuniu)
18	MF	CHN	Zhang Lei (Released)
19	DF	CHN	Chen Fubang (loan return to Liaoning FC)
20	FW	CHN	Jiao Yang (Released)
21	GK	CHN	Tang Ge (Released)
22	DF	CHN	Liu Boxin (Released)
23	DF	CHN	Li Hao (to Nantong Zhiyun)
25	MF	CHN	Yang Lianfeng (loan return to Liaoning FC)
26	DF	CHN	Zhang Jiakuo (to Jilin Baijia)
29	DF	CHN	Zhang Tianhan (to Zhenjiang Huasa)

=== Shenyang Dongjin ===
In:

No.	Pos.	Nation	Player
5	DF	CHN	Mao Weixu (Free agent)
13	DF	CHN	Wang Bin (from (Belgium) Roeselare)
15	MF	CHN	Zhang Xiaotong (Free agent)
35	DF	CHN	Li Wenbo (Free agent)

Out:

No.	Pos.	Nation	Player
1	GK	CHN	Zhou Miao (Released)
3	DF	CHN	Tang Libo (to Jiangsu Yancheng Dingli)
4	DF	CHN	Zhang Junfeng (Released)
5	DF	CHN	Mao Weixu (Released)
6	MF	CHN	Yu Zhen (Released)
7	MF	CHN	Zhang Xu (to Shenzhen Pengcheng)
8	MF	CHN	Chen Jiashun (to Fujian Tianxin)
9	MF	CHN	Liu Xin (Released)
10	MF	CHN	Xia Deqiang (Released)
11	MF	CHN	Zhu Tianhao (Released)
12	MF	CHN	Abudunabi Adiljan (Released)
13	DF	CHN	Wang Bin (Released)
15	MF	CHN	Zhang Xiaotong (Released)
16	GK	CHN	Liu Wei (to Shijiazhuang Ever Bright)
17	FW	CHN	Wen Tianpeng (to Chongqing Dangdai Lifan)
18	GK	CHN	Chen Hongye (Released)
19	MF	CHN	Ma Tianming (to Fujian Tianxin)
20	FW	CHN	Guo Zihao (Released)
21	MF	CHN	Zhao Yuhan (Released)
22	GK	CHN	Yu Tinghan (Released)
23	DF	CHN	Huang Di (Released)
26	FW	CHN	Luan Zhibo (to Tianjin Teda)
27	MF	CHN	Pan Chi (Released)
28	DF	CHN	Yu Yaoxiang (Released)
29	MF	CHN	Hamit Shepket (to Suzhou Dongwu)
30	MF	CHN	Mirza'ekber Almjan (Released)
31	DF	CHN	Wang Mian (Released)
32	MF	CHN	Chen-Zeng Tailang (to Shijiazhuang Ever Bright)
33	DF	CHN	Xu Sen (Released)
35	DF	CHN	Li Wenbo (Released)
