= Xu Wu =

Xu Wu may refer to:

- Xu Wu (footballer, born 1991), Chinese football midfielder
- Xu Wu (footballer, born 1993), Chinese football defender
- Xu Wu, a cephalopod monster in Monster Hunter Wilds
