= Zhang Shuai (disambiguation) =

Zhang Shuai (born 1989) is a Chinese female tennis player.

Zhang Shuai may also refer to:

- Zhang Shuai (footballer, born 1981), Chinese male football player
- Zhang Shuai (footballer, born 1993), Chinese male football player
