= Abdureshit =

Abdureshit or Abdurixit (Chinese: 阿不都热西提; Uyghur: ئابدۇرىشىت) is a surname. Notable people with the surname include:

- Abdusalam Abdurixit (born 1996), Chinese basketball small forward
- Ablet Abdureshit, Chinese politician
- Elizat Abdureshit (born 2000), Chinese football forward
