= Liu Li =

Liu Li or Li Liu may refer to:

- Liu Li (archaeologist), Chinese archaeologist
- Liu Li (Three Kingdoms) (died 244), prince of the Shu Han state in the Three Kingdoms period
- Li Liu (Cheng-Han) (248–303), ruler of the Cheng-Han state of the Sixteen Kingdoms
- Liu Li (runner) (born 1971), Chinese runner
- Liu Li (judoka) (born 1998), Chinese Paralympic judoka
- Liu Li (Paralympic athlete) (born 1986), Chinese Paralympic athlete
- Liu Li (footballer) (born 1997), Chinese association footballer
