= Gao Xin =

Gao Xin may refer to:

- Gao Xin (tennis) (born 1994), Chinese tennis player
- Gao Xin (footballer) (born 1997), Chinese footballer
- Gao Xin (actor), Chinese actor
- Emperor Ku, legendary sovereign of China, also known as Gaoxin

== See also ==
- Gao Xing (born 1974), Chinese amateur astronomer
