= Yu Chenglei =

Chinese association football player

Personal information
- Date of birth: 8 March 1997 (age 29)
- Height: 1.78 m (5 ft 10 in)
- Position: Defender

Team information
- Current team: Shandong Taishan

Youth career
- –2018: Shandong Taishan

Senior career*
Years	Team	Apps	(Gls)
2018–	Shandong Taishan	0	(0)
2018	→ Sichuan Jiuniu (loan)	1	(0)
- * Club domestic league appearances and goals as of 14:01, 28 July 2021 (UTC)

Yu Chenglei (Chinese: 于成磊; born 8 March 1997) is a Chinese footballer currently playing as a defender for Shandong Taishan.

== Career statistics ==
=== Club ===
As of 28 July 2021.

Club	Season	League			Cup		Continental		Other		Total	
Club	Season	Division	Apps	Goals	Apps	Goals	Apps	Goals	Apps	Goals	Apps	Goals
Shandong Taishan	2018	Chinese Super League	0	0	0	0	0	0	0	0	0	0
Shandong Taishan	2020	Chinese Super League	0	0	0	0	0	0	0	0	0	0
Shandong Taishan	2020	Chinese Super League	0	0	0	0	0	0	0	0	0	0
Shandong Taishan	2021	Chinese Super League	0	0	0	0	0	0	0	0	0	0
Shandong Taishan	Total		0	0	0	0	0	0	0	0	0	0
Sichuan Jiuniu (loan)	2018	China League Two	1	0	1 (Note: Appearances in the Chinese FA Cup)	0	–		0	0	2	0
Career total			1	0	1	0	0	0	0	0	2	0
