= Mehmud Abdukerem =

Chinese footballer (born 1993)

Personal information
- Date of birth: 14 April 1993 (age 33)
- Place of birth: Kashgar, Xinjiang, China
- Height: 1.80 m (5 ft 11 in)
- Position: Defender

Team information
- Current team: Xinjiang Tianshan Leopard
- Number: 14

Youth career
- –2013: Xinjiang FA
- 2014–2015: Xinjiang Tianshan Leopard

Senior career*
| Years | Team | Apps | (Gls) |
| 2015–2023 | Xinjiang Tianshan Leopard | 64 | (3) |
- * Club domestic league appearances and goals as of 14:01, 9 August 2021 (UTC)

Mehmud Abdukerem (Chinese: 麦合木提·阿卜杜克热木; Uyghur: مەخمۇت ئابدۇكېرىم; born 14 April 1993) is a Chinese footballer who played most recently as a defender for Xinjiang Tianshan Leopard.

On 10 September 2024, Chinese Football Association announced that Mehmud was banned from football-related activities for lifetime for involving in match-fixing.

== Career statistics ==
=== Club ===
As of 17 August 2021.

| Club | Season | League | | | Cup | | Other | | Total | |
| Club | Season | Division | Apps | Goals | Apps | Goals | Apps | Goals | Apps | Goals |
|---|---|---|---|---|---|---|---|---|---|---|
| Xinjiang FA | 2013 | – | | | 2 (Note: Appearances in the Chinese FA Cup) | 0 | 0 | 0 | 2 | 0 |
| Xinjiang Tianshan Leopard | 2015 | China League One | 0 | 0 | 1 | 0 | 0 | 0 | 1 | 0 |
| Xinjiang Tianshan Leopard | 2016 | China League One | 9 | 0 | 1 | 0 | 0 | 0 | 10 | 0 |
| Xinjiang Tianshan Leopard | 2017 | China League One | 9 | 0 | 1 | 0 | 0 | 0 | 10 | 0 |
| Xinjiang Tianshan Leopard | 2018 | China League One | 0 | 0 | 0 | 0 | 0 | 0 | 0 | 0 |
| Xinjiang Tianshan Leopard | 2019 | China League One | 21 | 3 | 1 | 0 | 0 | 0 | 22 | 3 |
| Xinjiang Tianshan Leopard | 2020 | China League One | 10 | 0 | 0 | 0 | 2 (Note: Appearances in the China League One playoffs) | 0 | 12 | 0 |
| Xinjiang Tianshan Leopard | 2021 | China League One | 15 | 0 | 0 | 0 | 0 | 0 | 15 | 0 |
| Xinjiang Tianshan Leopard | Total | | 64 | 3 | 4 | 0 | 2 | 0 | 70 | 3 |
| Career total | | | 64 | 3 | 6 | 0 | 2 | 0 | 72 | 3 |
