= Arapat Mijit =

Chinese association football player

Personal information
- Date of birth: 8 September 1991 (age 35)
- Height: 1.79 m (5 ft 10 in)
- Position: Right-back

Team information
- Current team: Xinjiang Tianshan Leopard
- Number: 6

Senior career*
Years	Team	Apps	(Gls)
2015–2023	Xinjiang Tianshan Leopard	80	(1)
- * Club domestic league appearances and goals as of 14:01, 9 August 2021 (UTC)

Arapat Mijit (Chinese: 艾尔帕提·米吉提; Uyghur: ئاراپات مىجىت; born 8 September 1991) is a Chinese footballer most recently playing as a right-back for Xinjiang Tianshan Leopard.

== Career statistics ==
=== Club ===
As of 9 August 2021.

Club	Season	League			Cup		Other		Total	
Club	Season	Division	Apps	Goals	Apps	Goals	Apps	Goals	Apps	Goals
Xinjiang Tianshan Leopard	2015	China League One	8	0	1 (Note: Appearances in the Chinese FA Cup)	0	0	0	9	0
Xinjiang Tianshan Leopard	2016	China League One	0	0	0	0	0	0	0	0
Xinjiang Tianshan Leopard	2017	China League One	11	0	1	0	0	0	12	0
Xinjiang Tianshan Leopard	2018	China League One	13	0	1	0	0	0	14	0
Xinjiang Tianshan Leopard	2019	China League One	28	1	0	0	0	0	28	1
Xinjiang Tianshan Leopard	2020	China League One	11	0	0	0	2 (Note: Appearances in the China League One playoffs)	0	13	0
Xinjiang Tianshan Leopard	2021	China League One	9	0	0	0	0	0	9	0
Career total			80	1	3	0	2	0	85	1
