= Memet-Abdulla Ezmat =

Chinese association football player

Personal information
- Date of birth: 21 November 1997 (age 28)
- Place of birth: Xinjiang, China
- Height: 1.75 m (5 ft 9 in)
- Position: Forward

Senior career*
Years	Team	Apps	(Gls)
2019–2021	Qingdao FC	50	(2)
2022	Nantong Zhiyun	1	(0)
2022	→ Guangxi Pingguo Haliao (loan)	7	(0)
2023-2024	Shenzhen Juniors	3	(0)
- * Club domestic league appearances and goals as of 13 November 2022

Memet-Abdulla Ezmat (Chinese: 麦麦提阿卜杜拉·艾孜麦提, Uyghur: مەمەت-ئابدۇللا ئەزمەت ; born 21 November 1997) is a Chinese footballer who plays as a forward.

== Club career ==
Memet-Abdulla Ezmat was promoted to the senior team of Qingdao Huanghai within the 2019 China League One season and would make his debut in a league game on 16 March 2019 against Shaanxi Chang'an Athletic F.C. in a 3-0 defeat. After that game he would become a regular member of the team that would go on to win the division and promotion into the top tier.

== Career statistics ==
As of 13 November 2022.

Club	Season	League			Cup		Continental		Other		Total	
Club	Season	Division	Apps	Goals	Apps	Goals	Apps	Goals	Apps	Goals	Apps	Goals
Qingdao Huanghai	2019	China League One	21	1	2 (Note: Appearances in the Chinese FA Cup)	0	–		–		23	1
Qingdao Huanghai	2020	Chinese Super League	17	1	1	0	–		–		18	1
Qingdao Huanghai	2021	Chinese Super League	12	0	2	0	–		–		14	0
Qingdao Huanghai	Total		50	2	5	0	0	0	0	0	55	2
Nantong Zhiyun	2022	China League One	1	0	0	0	–		–		1	0
Guangxi Pingguo Haliao	2022	China League One	7	0	1	0	–		–		8	0
Career total			58	2	6	0	0	0	0	0	64	2

== Honours ==
=== Club ===
Qingdao Huanghai

- China League One: 2019
