= Li Fengyin =

Chinese association football player

Personal information
- Date of birth: 21 August 1997 (age 29)
- Place of birth: Qingdao, Shandong, China
- Height: 1.70 m (5 ft 7 in)
- Position: Defender

Youth career
- 2013–2015: Mafra
- 2015–2016: Loures
- 2016–2018: Cova da Piedade
- 2018–2020: Shijiazhuang Ever Bright

Senior career*
Years	Team	Apps	(Gls)
2016–2018	Cova da Piedade	0	(0)
2016–2017	→ Oleiros (loan)	7	(0)
2017–2018	Cova da Piedade B	6	(0)
2020	Shijiazhuang Ever Bright	0	(0)
2021	Qingdao Youth Island	9	(0)
2022	Qingdao Red Lions	8	(0)
- * Club domestic league appearances and goals as of 17:14, 31 January 2023 (UTC)

Li Fengyin (Chinese: 李凤胤; born 21 August 1997) is a Chinese footballer who plays as defender.

== Club career ==
Li Fengyin would go abroad to Portugal to further his football development and at Cova da Piedade he would be loaned out to lower league side Oleiros where he would make his professional debut in a league game on 28 August 2016 against Fátima in a 3–2 defeat. After a run of games he would return to Cova da Piedade and play for their Cova da Piedade B team for the following season. After several years abroad he would return to China on 13 July 2018 with Shijiazhuang Ever Bright where he play for their youth and reserve teams before being promoted to their senior team.

On 3 March 2021, Li signed for third-tier club Qingdao Youth Island ahead of the 2021 China League Two season. After a season with them he would join another third-tier club in Qingdao Red Lions on 5 May 2022, before the start of the 2021 China League Two season.

== Career statistics ==
As of 31 January 2023.

Club	Season	League			Cup		Continental		Other		Total	
Club	Season	Division	Apps	Goals	Apps	Goals	Apps	Goals	Apps	Goals	Apps	Goals
Oleiros (loan)	2016–17	Campeonato de Portugal	7	0	0	0	–		–		7	0
Cova da Piedade B	2017–18	II AF Setúbal	6	0	0	0	–		–		6	0
Shijiazhuang Ever Bright	2020	Chinese Super League	0	0	0	0	–		–		0	0
Qingdao Youth Island	2021	China League Two	9	0	2	0	–		–		11	0
Qingdao Red Lions	2022	China League Two	8	0	–		–		–		8	0
Career total			30	0	2	0	0	0	0	0	32	0
