= Xu Jiajun =

Chinese footballer

Personal information
- Date of birth: 29 May 1995 (age 31)
- Place of birth: Maoming, Guangdong, China
- Height: 1.74 m (5 ft 9 in)
- Positions: Midfielder; defender

Team information
- Current team: Guizhou Guiyang Athletic
- Number: 29

Youth career
- 2014: Guangzhou R&F
- 2015–2017: Hebei China Fortune

Senior career*
Years	Team	Apps	(Gls)
2016–2017	Hebei China Fortune	0	(0)
2016	→ Shenyang Urban (loan)	4	(0)
2017–2018	Roeselare	2	(0)
2018	Beijing Renhe	0	(0)
2018	→ Yanbian Beiguo (loan)	14	(1)
2019–2020	Taizhou Yuanda	44	(16)
2021–2023	Qingdao Hainiu	45	(11)
2023	→ Heilongjiang Ice City (loan)	28	(3)
2024	Guangdong GZ-Power	24	(4)
2025	Jiangxi Dingnan United	28	(3)
2026–	Guizhou Guiyang Athletic	0	(0)
- * Club domestic league appearances and goals as of 20 October 2024

Xu Jiajun (simplified Chinese: 许嘉俊; traditional Chinese: 許嘉俊; pinyin: Xǔ Jiājùn; born 29 May 1995) is a Chinese footballer currently playing as a midfielder or defender for Guizhou Guiyang Athletic.

== Club career ==
Xu started his professional football career in June 2016 when he was loaned to China League Two side Shenyang Urban from Hebei China Fortune. He moved aboard to Belgian First Division B side Roeselare along with Wang Bin in July 2017. On 27 October 2017, he made his debut for the club in a 5–0 away defeat against Beerschot Wilrijk, coming on as a substitute for Davy Brouwers in the 79th minute.

In July 2018, Xu transferred to Super League side Beijing Renhe, he was loaned to Yanbian Beiguo for the rest of the season. On 11 February 2019, Xu transferred to League Two newcomer Taizhou Yuanda. He would go on to establish himself as a vital player and help the club gain promotion to the second tier at the end of the 2019 China League Two campaign. After two seasons with the team the club would dissolve and he would join third tier club Qingdao Hainiu. He would go on to play a vital part as the club won the third tier title and promotion at the end of the 2021 China League Two season. He would go on to achieve successive promotions as he helped guide the club to second in the 2022 China League One season and promotion back into the top tier.

== Career statistics ==
As of 20 October 2024.

Club	Season	League			National Cup		Continental		Other		Total	
Club	Season	Division	Apps	Goals	Apps	Goals	Apps	Goals	Apps	Goals	Apps	Goals
Hebei China Fortune	2016	Chinese Super League	0	0	0	0	–		–		0	0
Shenyang Urban (loan)	2016	China League Two	4	0	0	0	–		–		4	0
Roeselare	2017–18	Belgian First Division B	2	0	0	0	–		–		2	0
Yanbian Beiguo (loan)	2018	China League Two	14	1	0	0	–		–		14	1
Taizhou Yuanda	2019	China League Two	32	12	4	1	–		–		35	13
Taizhou Yuanda	2020	China League One	12	4	1	0	–		–		13	4
Taizhou Yuanda	Total		44	16	5	1	0	0	0	0	49	17
Qingdao Hainiu	2021	China League Two	27	6	1	1	–		–		28	7
Qingdao Hainiu	2022	China League One	18	5	1	0	–		–		19	5
Qingdao Hainiu	Total		45	11	2	1	0	0	0	0	47	12
Heilongjiang Ice City (loan)	2023	China League One	28	3	2	0	–		–		30	3
Guangdong GZ-Power	2024	China League Two	24	4	2	0	–		–		26	4
Career total			161	35	9	4	0	0	0	0	172	37
