= Anwar Memet-Ali =

Chinese footballer

Personal information
- Full name: Anwar Memet-Ali
- Date of birth: 10 September 1997 (age 29)
- Place of birth: Xinjiang, China
- Height: 1.76 m (5 ft 9 in)
- Positions: Winger; forward

Senior career*
Years	Team	Apps	(Gls)
2017–2021	Guizhou Hengfeng	49	(1)
2022	Cangzhou Mighty Lions		
2022	→ Guangxi Pingguo Haliao		
- * Club domestic league appearances and goals as of 29 April 2022

Anwar Memet-Ali (Chinese: 安外尔·麦麦提艾力; born 10 September 1997) is a Chinese footballer.

== Club career ==
Anwar joined Chinese Super League newcomer Guizhou Hengfeng in 2017. On 4 March 2018, he made his debut for the club in a 3–1 home defeat against Jiangsu Suning, coming on as a substitute for Liang Xueming in the 62nd minute.

== Career statistics ==
As of 31 December 2020.

Appearances and goals by club, season and competition
Club	Season	League			National Cup		Continental		Other		Total	
Club	Season	Division	Apps	Goals	Apps	Goals	Apps	Goals	Apps	Goals	Apps	Goals
Guizhou Hengfeng	2017	Chinese Super League	0	0	0	0	-		-		0	0
Guizhou Hengfeng	2018	Chinese Super League	6	0	2	0	-		-		8	0
Guizhou Hengfeng	2019	China League One	27	0	1	0	-		-		28	0
Guizhou Hengfeng	Total		33	0	3	0	0	0	0	0	36	0
Career total			33	0	3	0	0	0	0	0	36	0
