= Chen Zhengfeng =

Chinese association football player

Personal information
- Date of birth: 26 January 2001 (age 25)
- Place of birth: Wenzhou, Zhejiang, China
- Height: 1.76 m (5 ft 9 in)
- Position: Midfielder

Team information
- Current team: Wenzhou FC (assistant coach)

Youth career
- –2020: Guangzhou Evergrande

Senior career*
| Years | Team | Apps | (Gls) |
| 2020–2022 | Guangzhou FC | 0 | (0) |
| 2020 | → Shaanxi Beyond (loan) | 6 | (0) |
| 2022 | → Dongguan Guanlian (loan) | 5 | (0) |
| 2023 | Foshan Nanshi | 7 | (0) |

Managerial career
- 2026–: Wenzhou FC (assistant)
- * Club domestic league appearances and goals as of 14:01, 25 June 2021 (UTC)

Chen Zhengfeng (simplified Chinese: 陈郑烽; traditional Chinese: 陳鄭烽; pinyin: Chén Zhèngfēng; born 26 January 2001) is a Chinese football coach and former footballer who played as a midfielder.

On 24 July 2026, Chen was named as the assistant coach of China League Two side Wenzhou FC.

== Career statistics ==
=== Club ===
As of 25 June 2021.

| Club | Season | League | | | Cup | | Continental | | Other | | Total | |
| Club | Season | Division | Apps | Goals | Apps | Goals | Apps | Goals | Apps | Goals | Apps | Goals |
|---|---|---|---|---|---|---|---|---|---|---|---|---|
| Guangzhou FC | 2020 | Chinese Super League | 0 | 0 | 0 | 0 | 0 | 0 | 0 | 0 | 0 | 0 |
| Guangzhou FC | 2021 | Chinese Super League | 0 | 0 | 0 | 0 | 1 (Note: Appearances in the AFC Champions League) | 0 | 0 | 0 | 1 | 0 |
| Guangzhou FC | Total | | 0 | 0 | 0 | 0 | 0 | 0 | 0 | 0 | 1 | 0 |
| Shaanxi Beyond (loan) | 2020 | China League Two | 6 | 0 | 0 | 0 | – | | 0 | 0 | 6 | 0 |
| Career total | | | 6 | 0 | 0 | 0 | 0 | 0 | 0 | 0 | 7 | 0 |
