= He Tongshuai =

Chinese footballer (born 1999)

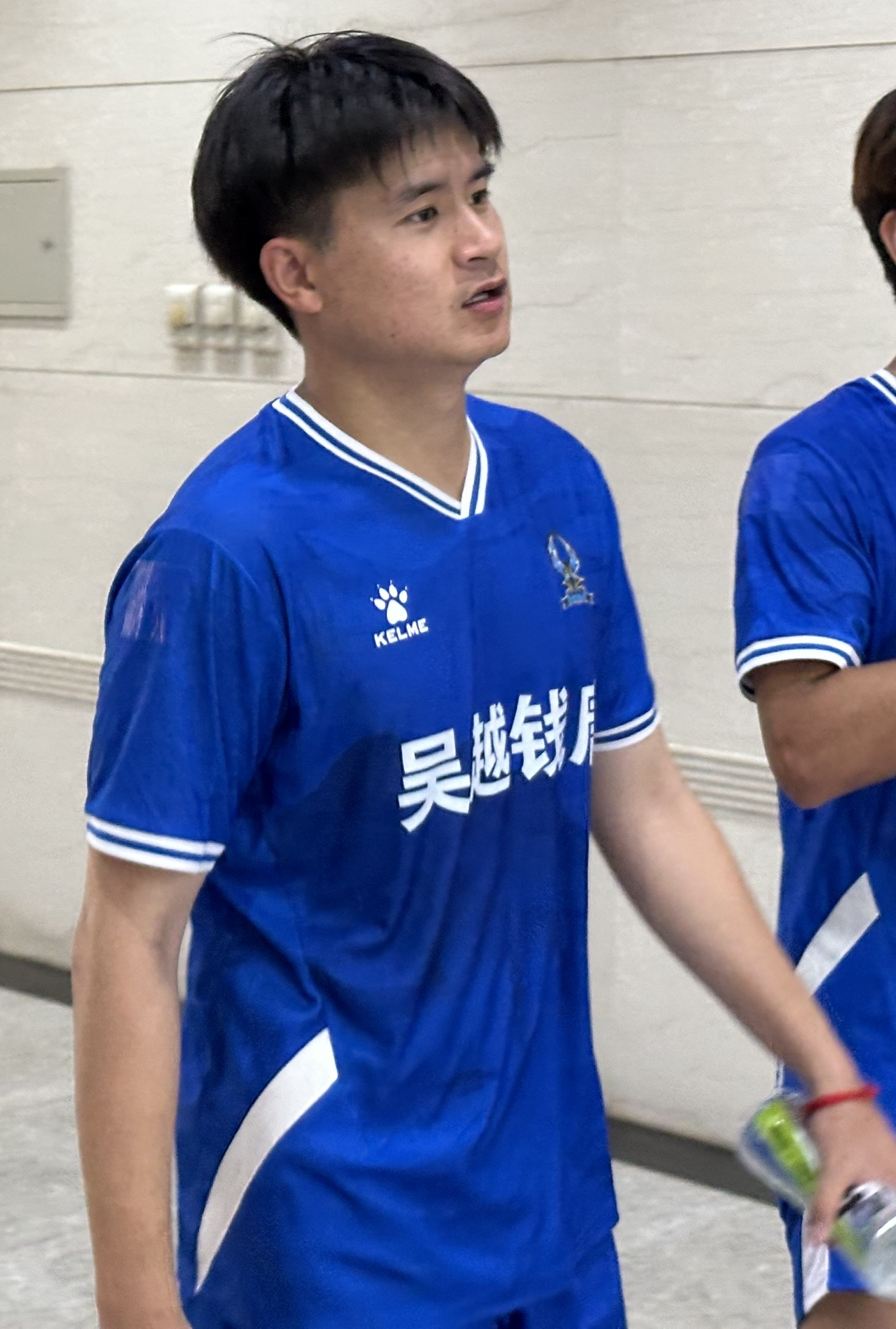
- He Tongshuai in June 2025

Personal information
- Date of birth: 27 January 1999 (age 27)
- Place of birth: Zhongxiang, Hubei, China
- Height: 1.75 m (5 ft 9 in)
- Position: Midfielder

Team information
- Current team: Hangzhou Linping Wuyue
- Number: 6

Youth career
- Shandong Taishan

Senior career*
Years	Team	Apps	(Gls)
2018	→ Zibo Sunday (loan)	5	(1)
2019–2020	Zibo Cuju	38	(1)
2021	Beijing Sport University	4	(0)
2021	Dongguan United	12	(1)
2022–2024	Wuhan Three Towns	2	(0)
2023	→ Hainan Star (loan)	14	(0)
2024	→ Haikou Mingcheng (loan)	13	(0)
2025–	Hangzhou Linping Wuyue	28	(3)
- * Club domestic league appearances and goals as of 11 January 2023

He Tongshuai (Chinese: 何统帅; born 27 November 1999) is a Chinese footballer who plays as a midfielder for Hangzhou Linping Wuyue.

== Club career ==
He Tongshuai would play for the Shandong Taishan youth team before being allowed to join third tier club Zibo Cuju on loan on 13 July 2018. This would be followed by a permanent move to Zibo the next season on 23 February 2019. He would go on to establish himself as a vital member of the team and would help them earn promotion to the Chinese second tier at the end of the 2020 China League Two campaign. He would not remain with the club and on 12 April 2021 he would join another second tier club in Beijing Sport University. This would be followed by his debut in a league game against Kunshan on 25 April 2021 in a 2-2 draw. He would struggle to gain much more playing time and after only four appearances without scoring a goal he would leave the club on 30 July 2021 to sign for Chinese third tier club Dongguan United.

On 13 April 2022, he signed with newly promoted top tier side Wuhan Three Towns. He would go on to make his debut on 17 November 2022, in a Chinese FA Cup game against Dandong Tengyue, which ended in a 5-1 victory. This would be followed by his first league game for them on 4 December 2022 against Cangzhou Mighty Lions, which ended in a 4-0 victory. Throughout the season he would go on to establish himself as a squad player within the team that won the 2022 Chinese Super League title.

== Career statistics ==
As of 11 January 2023.

Appearances and goals by club, season and competition
Club	Season	League			National Cup		Continental		Other		Total	
Club	Season	Division	Apps	Goals	Apps	Goals	Apps	Goals	Apps	Goals	Apps	Goals
Zibo Cuju (loan)	2018	China League Two	5	1	0	0	-		-		5	1
Zibo Cuju	2019	China League Two	28	1	3	0	-		-		31	1
Zibo Cuju	2020	China League Two	10	0	-		-		-		10	0
Zibo Cuju	Total		38	1	3	0	0	0	0	0	41	1
Beijing Sport University	2021	China League One	4	0	0	0	-		-		4	0
Dongguan United	2021	China League Two	12	1	0	0	-		-		12	1
Wuhan Three Towns	2022	Chinese Super League	2	0	3	0	-		-		5	0
Career total			61	3	6	0	0	0	0	0	67	3

== Honours ==
=== Club ===
Wuhan Three Towns

- Chinese Super League: 2022.
