= Chen Guoliang =

Chinese association football player

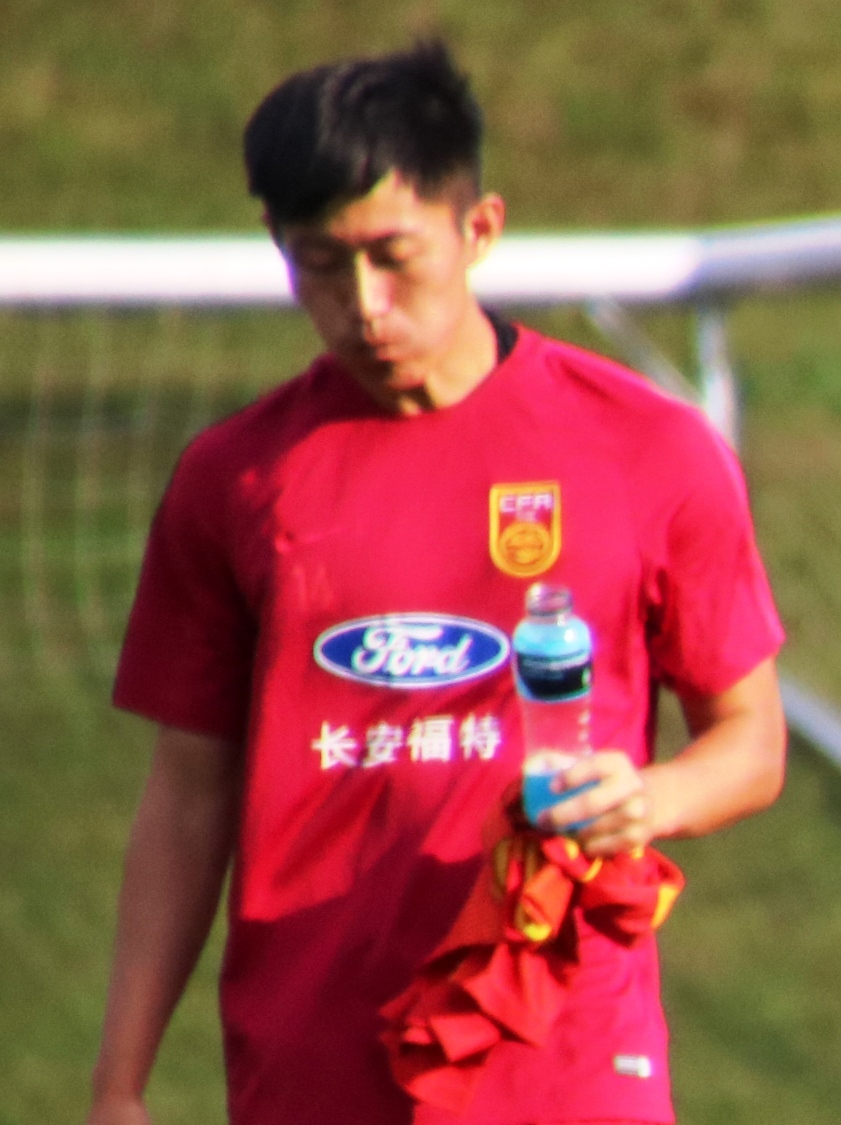

Personal information
- Date of birth: 2 February 1999 (age 27)
- Place of birth: Zoucheng, Shandong, China
- Height: 1.84 m (6 ft 0 in)
- Position: Defender

Team information
- Current team: Changchun Yatai
- Number: 2

Youth career
- Shandong Luneng Taishan

Senior career*
Years	Team	Apps	(Gls)
2018–2019	Estudiantes de Murcia	23	(0)
2020	Los Garres	0	(0)
2020–2023	Shenzhen FC	16	(1)
2022	→ Liaoning Shenyang Urban (loan)	17	(0)
2024	Chengdu Rongcheng	0	(0)
2025	Guangdong GZ-Power	17	(0)
2026–	Changchun Yatai	0	(0)

International career
2018	China U19	2	(0)
- * Club domestic league appearances and goals as of 31 December 2025 (UTC)

Chen Guoliang (Chinese: 陈国良; born 2 February 1999) is a Chinese footballer currently playing as a defender for Changchun Yatai.

== Club career ==
Chen Guoliang started his football career with Shandong Luneng Taishan youth team, spending time in 2014 with the club's affiliate training centre in Brazil. In January 2018, Chen moved to Spain to sign for Estudiantes de Murcia. After two seasons with Estudiantes, he spent the beginning of 2020 with Los Garres, but did not feature. He would return to China to sign for top tier club Shenzhen FC on 3 February of the same year.

On 28 April 2022, he was loaned to China League One side Liaoning Shenyang Urban for the 2022 China League One campaign. He would make his debut for the club in a league game on 5 July 2022 against Heilongjiang Ice City in a 2-0 defeat.

On 13 January 2026, Chen joined China League One side Changchun Yatai.

== Career statistics ==
As of 31 December 2025.

Club	Season	League			Cup		Continental		Other		Total	
Club	Season	Division	Apps	Goals	Apps	Goals	Apps	Goals	Apps	Goals	Apps	Goals
Estudiantes de Murcia	2017–18	Tercera División	8	0	0	0	–		–		8	0
Estudiantes de Murcia	2018–19	Tercera División	15	0	0	0	–		–		15	0
Estudiantes de Murcia	Total		23	0	0	0	0	0	0	0	23	0
Los Garres	2019–20	Tercera División	0	0	0	0	–		–		0	0
Shenzhen FC	2020	Chinese Super League	0	0	0	0	–		–		0	0
Shenzhen FC	2021	Chinese Super League	0	0	0	0	–		–		0	0
Shenzhen FC	2022	Chinese Super League	0	0	0	0	–		–		0	0
Shenzhen FC	2023	Chinese Super League	16	1	1	0	–		–		17	1
Shenzhen FC	Total		16	1	1	0	0	0	0	0	17	1
Liaoning Shenyang Urban (loan)	2022	China League One	17	0	1	0	–		–		18	0
Chengdu Rongcheng	2024	Chinese Super League	0	0	1	0	–		–		1	0
Guangdong GZ-Power	2025	China League One	17	0	4	0	–		–		23	0
Career total			73	1	7	0	0	0	0	0	80	1
