= Wang Bin (footballer) =

Chinese footballer

Wang Bin 王宾
Personal information
- Date of birth: 23 May 1989 (age 37)
- Place of birth: Beijing, China
- Height: 1.85 m (6 ft 1 in)
- Position: Center-back

Youth career
- Beijing Jingtong
- América
- Mogi Mirim
- XV de Piracicaba

Senior career*
Years	Team	Apps	(Gls)
2009–2013	Guangzhou R&F	13	(0)
2016–2017	Shenyang Urban	17	(0)
2017–2018	Roeselare	1	(0)
2018	Shenyang Dongjin	2	(0)
2019–2021	Guizhou Hengfeng	23	(0)
- * Club domestic league appearances and goals as of 31 December 2020

Wang Bin (Chinese: 王宾; pinyin: Wáng Bīn; born 23 May 1989) is a Chinese football player who currently is a free agent.

== Club career ==
Wang Bin received professional football training in Brazilian club América, Mogi Mirim and XV de Piracicaba between 2002 and 2008. He moved to Chinese Super League side Changsha Ginde in 2009. He made his senior debut on 14 July 2010, in a 2–0 away defeat against Henan Construction. He played twice in the 2010 league season, as Changsha Ginde finished the bottom of the league and relegation to China League One. In February 2011, the club moved to Shenzhen as the club's name changed into Shenzhen Phoenix. The club were bought by Chinese property developers Guangzhou R&F and moved to Guangzhou in June 2011 and won promotion back to the Super League at the first attempt. Wang made 11 league appearances in the season. He was released at the end of the 2013 season. Wang joined China League Two side Shenyang Urban in 2016.

Wang moved aboard to Belgian First Division B side Roeselare along with Xu Jiajun in July 2017. On 1 December 2017, he made his debut for the club in a 1–0 away defeat against Beerschot Wilrijk, coming on as a substitute for Carlo Damman in the 68th minute.

Wang returned to China in March 2018 and joined China League Two side Shenyang Dongjin. On 23 June 2018, he made his debut in a 2–0 away defeat against Baotou Nanjiao. Wang became a free player in July 2018 when Shenyang Dongjin failed to register for the rest of the season due to wage arrears.

On 28 February 2019, Wang signed a contract with newly-relegated China League One side Guizhou Hengfeng.

== Career statistics ==
Statistics accurate as of match played 31 December 2020

Appearances and goals by club, season and competition
Club	Season	League			National Cup		Continental		Other		Total	
Club	Season	Division	Apps	Goals	Apps	Goals	Apps	Goals	Apps	Goals	Apps	Goals
Guangzhou R&F	2009	Chinese Super League	0	0	-		-		-		0	0
Guangzhou R&F	2010	Chinese Super League	2	0	-		-		-		2	0
Guangzhou R&F	2011	China League One	11	0	0	0	-		-		11	0
Guangzhou R&F	2012	Chinese Super League	0	0	0	0	-		-		0	0
Guangzhou R&F	2013	Chinese Super League	0	0	0	0	-		-		0	0
Guangzhou R&F	Total		13	0	0	0	0	0	0	0	13	0
Shenyang Urban	2016	China League Two	15	0	2	0	-		-		17	0
Shenyang Urban	2017	China League Two	2	0	0	0	-		-		2	0
Shenyang Urban	Total		17	0	2	0	0	0	0	0	19	0
Roeselare	2017–18	Belgian First Division B	1	0	0	0	-		-		1	0
Shenyang Dongjin	2018	China League Two	2	0	0	0	-		-		2	0
Guizhou Hengfeng	2019	China League One	18	0	0	0	-		-		18	0
Guizhou Hengfeng	2020	China League One	5	0	0	0	-		-		5	0
Guizhou Hengfeng	Total		23	0	0	0	0	0	0	0	23	0
Career total			56	0	2	0	0	0	0	0	58	0
