= Wen Tianpeng =

Chinese association football player

Personal information
- Date of birth: 9 June 1997 (age 29)
- Height: 1.78 m (5 ft 10 in)
- Position: Forward

Team information
- Current team: Quanzhou Yassin (on loan from Chongqing Lifan)

Youth career
- 2018–2019: Chongqing Lifan

Senior career*
| Years | Team | Apps | (Gls) |
| 2015–2018 | Shenyang Dongjin | 56 | (3) |
| 2019– | Chongqing Lifan | 14 | (0) |
| 2022- | → Quanzhou Yassin (loan) | 0 | (0) |
- * Club domestic league appearances and goals as of 14:01, 6 May 2022 (UTC)

Wen Tianpeng (simplified Chinese: 温天鹏; traditional Chinese: 溫天鵬; pinyin: Wēn Tiānpéng; born 9 June 1997) is a Chinese footballer currently playing as a forward for Quanzhou Yassin, on loan from Chongqing Lifan.

== Club career ==
Wen Tianpeng would play for Shenyang Dongjin before being signed by top tier club Chongqing Lifan on 4 July 2019. He would go on to make his debut for Chongqing on 27 July 2019 in a league game against Hebei China Fortune F.C. in a 3-0 defeat.

== Career statistics ==
As of 31 December 2020.

Appearances and goals by club, season and competition
| Club | Season | League | | | National Cup | | Continental | | Other | | Total | |
| Club | Season | Division | Apps | Goals | Apps | Goals | Apps | Goals | Apps | Goals | Apps | Goals |
|---|---|---|---|---|---|---|---|---|---|---|---|---|
| Shenyang Dongjin | 2015 | China League Two | 10 | 1 | 0 | 0 | – | | – | | 10 | 1 |
| Shenyang Dongjin | 2016 | China League Two | 15 | 1 | 0 | 0 | – | | – | | 15 | 1 |
| Shenyang Dongjin | 2017 | China League Two | 20 | 0 | 1 | 0 | – | | – | | 21 | 0 |
| Shenyang Dongjin | 2018 | China League Two | 13 | 1 | 2 | 0 | – | | – | | 15 | 1 |
| Shenyang Dongjin | Total | | 58 | 3 | 3 | 0 | 0 | 0 | 0 | 0 | 61 | 3 |
| Chongqing Lifan | 2019 | Chinese Super League | 6 | 0 | 0 | 0 | – | | – | | 6 | 0 |
| Chongqing Lifan | 2020 | Chinese Super League | 4 | 0 | 1 | 0 | – | | – | | 5 | 0 |
| Chongqing Lifan | Total | | 10 | 0 | 1 | 0 | 0 | 0 | 0 | 0 | 11 | 0 |
| Career total | | | 68 | 3 | 4 | 0 | 0 | 0 | 0 | 0 | 72 | 3 |
