= Fang Xinfeng =

Chinese association football player

Personal information
- Date of birth: 21 July 1999 (age 27)
- Place of birth: Qingdao, Shandong, China
- Height: 1.82 m (6 ft 0 in)
- Position: Defender

Team information
- Current team: Qingdao Red Lions
- Number: 2

Youth career
- –2017: Qingdao Jonoon
- 2017–2018: Qingdao Huanghai

Senior career*
| Years | Team | Apps | (Gls) |
| 2018–2021 | Qingdao FC | 16 | (0) |
| 2022 | Qingdao Youth Island | 0 | (0) |
| 2022 | → Qingdao Red Lions (loan) | 5 | (1) |
| 2023- | Qingdao Red Lions | 7 | (0) |
- * Club domestic league appearances and goals as of 23:55, 3 April 2022 (UTC)

Fang Xinfeng (Chinese: 房欣峰; born 21 July 1999) is a Chinese footballer currently playing as a defender for Qingdao Red Lions.

== Club career ==
Fang Xinfeng was promoted to the senior team of Qingdao Huanghai within the 2018 China League One season and would make his debut in a Chinese FA Cup game against Sichuan Longfor F.C. on 11 April 2018 in a 3-0 defeat. This would be followed by his first league game on 6 October 2018 against Yanbian Funde in a 2-1 victory. He would go on to be a squad player that would aid the club to win the 2019 China League One division and promotion into the top tier.

== Career statistics ==
As of 31 December 2020.

| Club | Season | League | | | National Cup | | Continental | | Other | | Total | |
| Club | Season | Division | Apps | Goals | Apps | Goals | Apps | Goals | Apps | Goals | Apps | Goals |
|---|---|---|---|---|---|---|---|---|---|---|---|---|
| Qingdao Huanghai | 2018 | China League One | 1 | 0 | 1 | 0 | – | | – | | 2 | 0 |
| Qingdao Huanghai | 2019 | China League One | 5 | 0 | 2 | 0 | – | | – | | 7 | 0 |
| Qingdao Huanghai | 2020 | Chinese Super League | 4 | 0 | 1 | 0 | – | | – | | 5 | 0 |
| Career total | | | 10 | 0 | 4 | 0 | 0 | 0 | 0 | 0 | 14 | 0 |

== Honours ==
=== Club ===
Qingdao Huanghai

- China League One: 2019
