= Hu Haoyue =

Chinese association football player

Personal information
- Date of birth: 1 June 2003 (age 23)
- Place of birth: Chongqing, China
- Position: Midfielder

Team information
- Current team: Ganzhou Ruishi
- Number: 8

Youth career
- –2020: Chongqing FA

Senior career*
| Years | Team | Apps | (Gls) |
| 2021–2024 | Suzhou Dongwu | 24 | (0) |
| 2022 | → Hubei Istar (loan) | 3 | (0) |
| 2025 | Kunming City | 23 | (0) |
| 2026– | Ganzhou Ruishi | 0 | (0) |
- * Club domestic league appearances and goals as of 22:49, 8 March 2026 (UTC)

Hu Haoyue (Chinese: 胡浩越; born 1 June 2003) is a Chinese footballer currently playing as a midfielder for China League Two club Ganzhou Ruishi.

== Career statistics ==
=== Club ===
As of 27 July 2021.

| Club | Season | League | | | Cup | | Continental | | Other | | Total | |
| Club | Season | Division | Apps | Goals | Apps | Goals | Apps | Goals | Apps | Goals | Apps | Goals |
|---|---|---|---|---|---|---|---|---|---|---|---|---|
| Suzhou Dongwu | 2021 | China League One | 1 | 0 | 0 | 0 | – | | 0 | 0 | 1 | 0 |
| Career total | | | 1 | 0 | 0 | 0 | 0 | 0 | 0 | 0 | 1 | 0 |
