= Liu Li (footballer) =

Chinese association football player

Personal information
- Date of birth: 3 April 1997 (age 29)
- Height: 1.76 m (5 ft 9 in)
- Position: Midfielder

Team information
- Current team: Shandong Taishan

Youth career
- –2018: Shandong Taishan

Senior career*
Years	Team	Apps	(Gls)
2018–	Shandong Taishan	0	(0)
2018	→ Sichuan Jiuniu (loan)	9	(0)
- * Club domestic league appearances and goals as of 14:01, 28 July 2021 (UTC)

Liu Li (Chinese: 刘力; born 3 April 1997) is a Chinese footballer currently playing as a midfielder for Shandong Taishan.

== Career statistics ==
=== Club ===
As of 28 July 2021.

Club	Season	League			Cup		Continental		Other		Total	
Club	Season	Division	Apps	Goals	Apps	Goals	Apps	Goals	Apps	Goals	Apps	Goals
Shandong Taishan	2018	Chinese Super League	0	0	0	0	0	0	0	0	0	0
Shandong Taishan	2020	Chinese Super League	0	0	0	0	0	0	0	0	0	0
Shandong Taishan	2020	Chinese Super League	0	0	0	0	0	0	0	0	0	0
Shandong Taishan	2021	Chinese Super League	0	0	0	0	0	0	0	0	0	0
Shandong Taishan	Total		0	0	0	0	0	0	0	0	0	0
Sichuan Jiuniu (loan)	2018	China League Two	9	0	1 (Note: Appearances in the Chinese FA Cup)	0	–		1 (Note: Appearances in the China League Two playoffs)	0	11	0
Career total			9	0	1	0	0	0	1	0	11	0
