= Gao Xin (footballer) =

Chinese association football player

Personal information
- Date of birth: 22 February 1997 (age 29)
- Height: 1.74 m (5 ft 9 in)
- Position: Defender

Team information
- Current team: Jinhua Huayue

Youth career
- –2018: Shandong Taishan

Senior career*
Years	Team	Apps	(Gls)
2018–2020	Shandong Taishan	0	(0)
2018	→ Beijing BSU (loan)	3	(0)
2021–	Jinhua Huayue		
- * Club domestic league appearances and goals as of 14:01, 28 July 2021 (UTC)

Gao Xin (Chinese: 高鑫; born 22 February 1997) is a Chinese footballer currently playing as a defender for Jinhua Huayue.

== Career statistics ==
=== Club ===
As of 28 July 2021.

Club	Season	League			Cup		Continental		Other		Total	
Club	Season	Division	Apps	Goals	Apps	Goals	Apps	Goals	Apps	Goals	Apps	Goals
Shandong Taishan	2018	Chinese Super League	0	0	0	0	0	0	0	0	0	0
Shandong Taishan	2020	Chinese Super League	0	0	0	0	0	0	0	0	0	0
Shandong Taishan	2020	Chinese Super League	0	0	0	0	0	0	0	0	0	0
Shandong Taishan	Total		0	0	0	0	0	0	0	0	0	0
Beijing BSU (loan)	2018	China League One	3	0	0	0	–		0	0	3	0
Career total			3	0	0	0	0	0	0	0	3	0
