= Zhang Shuai (footballer, born 1993) =

Chinese footballer

Zhang Shuai 张帅
Personal information
- Full name: Zhang Shuai
- Date of birth: 15 January 1993 (age 33)
- Place of birth: Kaifeng, Henan, China
- Height: 1.89 m (6 ft 2 1/2 in)
- Positions: Centre-back; forward

Team information
- Current team: Xiamen Feilu
- Number: 35

Youth career
- 2011: Henan Jianye

Senior career*
Years	Team	Apps	(Gls)
2012–2016	Henan Jianye	4	(0)
2017–2019	Shijiazhuang Ever Bright	39	(3)
2020–2021	Beijing BSU	26	(0)
2022	Zibo Cuju	20	(1)
2023	Guangxi Pingguo Haliao	18	(1)
2024–2025	Qingdao Red Lions	24	(1)
2025	Foshan Nanshi	9	(0)
2026–	Xiamen Feilu	0	(0)
- * Club domestic league appearances and goals as of 8 March 2026

Zhang Shuai (Chinese: 张帅; born 15 January 1993) is a Chinese footballer who currently plays for China League Two club Xiamen Feilu.

== Club career ==
In 2012, Zhang Shuai started his professional footballer career with Henan Jianye in the Chinese Super League. On 18 July 2012, he made his senior debut in a 2–1 away defeat against Guangzhou Evergrande in the 2012 Chinese FA Cup, coming on as a substitute for Yuan Ye in the 65th minute. On 26 October 2014, he made his Super League debut against Hangzhou Greentown, coming on for Zhu Yifan in the 60th minute. He scored his first senior goal on 28 June 2016 in a 6–1 win over Yunnan Lijiang in the 2016 Chinese FA Cup. Despite this achievement he struggled to gain regular playing time and was dropped to the reserve team in the 2017 league season.

Zhang joined China League One side Shijiazhuang Ever Bright in June 2017 on a free transfer and was initially placed in the reserve squad. He was promoted to the first team squad in the summer of 2018. On 11 July 2018, he made his debut as a converted centre-back and scored his first goal for the club in a 3–3 home draw against Qingdao Huanghai.

== Career statistics ==
Statistics accurate as of match played 31 December 2023.

Appearances and goals by club, season and competition
Club	Season	League			National Cup		Continental		Other		Total	
Club	Season	Division	Apps	Goals	Apps	Goals	Apps	Goals	Apps	Goals	Apps	Goals
Henan Jianye	2012	Chinese Super League	0	0	1	0	-		-		1	0
Henan Jianye	2013	China League One	0	0	1	0	-		-		1	0
Henan Jianye	2014	Chinese Super League	2	0	0	0	-		-		2	0
Henan Jianye	2015	Chinese Super League	2	0	1	0	-		-		3	0
Henan Jianye	2016	Chinese Super League	0	0	1	1	-		-		1	1
Henan Jianye	Total		4	0	4	1	0	0	0	0	8	1
Shijiazhuang Ever Bright	2018	China League One	17	3	0	0	-		-		17	3
Shijiazhuang Ever Bright	2019	China League One	22	0	1	0	-		-		23	0
Shijiazhuang Ever Bright	Total		39	3	1	0	0	0	0	0	40	3
Beijing BSU	2020	China League One	6	0	-		-		-		6	0
Beijing BSU	2021	China League One	20	0	0	0	-		-		20	0
Beijing BSU	Total		26	0	0	0	0	0	0	0	26	0
Zibo Cuju	2022	China League One	20	1	1	0	-		-		21	1
Guangxi Pingguo Haliao	2023	China League One	18	1	0	0	-		-		18	1
Qingdao Red Lions	2024	China League One	0	0	0	0	-		-		0	0
Career total			107	5	6	1	0	0	0	0	113	6
