= Elizat Abdureshit =

Chinese association football player

Personal information
- Date of birth: 1 February 2000 (age 26)
- Place of birth: Yining, Xinjiang, China
- Height: 1.75 m (5 ft 9 in)
- Position: Forward

Team information
- Current team: Xinjiang Tianshan Leopard
- Number: 24

Senior career*
Years	Team	Apps	(Gls)
2021–2023	Xinjiang Tianshan Leopard	8	(0)
2023-	Dalian Huayi	0	(0)
- * Club domestic league appearances and goals as of 14:01, 9 August 2021 (UTC)

Elizat Abdureshit (Chinese: 艾力扎提·阿不都热西提; born 1 February 2000) is a Chinese footballer currently playing as a forward for Dalian Huayi.

On 10 September 2024, Chinese Football Association announced that Elizat was banned from football-related activities for five years, from 10 September 2024 to 9 September 2029, for involving in match-fixing.

== Career statistics ==
=== Club ===
As of 17 August 2021.

Club	Season	League			Cup		Other		Total	
Club	Season	Division	Apps	Goals	Apps	Goals	Apps	Goals	Apps	Goals
Xinjiang Tianshan Leopard	2021	China League One	8	0	0	0	0	0	8	0
Career total			8	0	0	0	0	0	8	0
