= Zhang Aokai =

Chinese footballer

Zhang Aokai 张奥凯
Personal information
- Full name: Zhang Aokai
- Date of birth: 18 February 2000 (age 26)
- Place of birth: Xianyang, Shaanxi, China
- Height: 1.76 m (5 ft 9 1/2 in)
- Position: Left winger

Team information
- Current team: Yanbian Longding

Youth career
- 2010–2012: Shaanxi Daqin
- 2012–2017: Guangzhou Evergrande
- 2017–2019: Espanyol

Senior career*
Years	Team	Apps	(Gls)
2016	Guangzhou Evergrande	1	(0)
2019–2020	Espanyol B	0	(0)
2019–2020	→ Horta (loan)	2	(0)
2020	→ Shijiazhuang Ever Bright (loan)	0	(0)
2021–2022	Cangzhou Mighty Lions	0	(0)
2022	→ Jiangxi Dark Horse Junior (loan)	14	(4)
2023–2024	Shanghai Jiading Huilong	6	(0)
2024-	Yanbian Longding	0	(0)

International career
2015	China U17	7	(1)
- * Club domestic league appearances and goals as of 12:00, 31 December 2022 (UTC)

Zhang Aokai (Chinese: 张奥凯; pinyin: Zhāng Àokǎi; Mandarin pronunciation: [ʈʂáŋ âʊ kʰàɪ]; born 18 February 2000), nicknamed Zhang OK (Chinese: 张OK), is a Chinese footballer who plays as a left winger for Yanbian Longding.

== Club career ==
Zhang Aokai joined Chinese Super League side Guangzhou Evergrande's youth academy from China League Two club Shaanxi Daqin in 2012. He was promoted to Guangzhou's first team squad by manager Luiz Felipe Scolari in July 2016. Zhang made his senior debut on 30 October 2016 in a 4–0 home win against Shandong Luneng, coming on for Zheng Zhi in the 85th minute and taking over the captaincy for the rest of the match, making him the first player born in the new millennium to make an appearance in any of the Chinese professional leagues.

Zhang was excluded from Guangzhou's first team squad for the 2017 season. He left the club and underwent a trial with La Liga side Espanyol in the summer of 2017. He signed a professional contract with Espanyol and joined Juvenil A team on 19 July 2018. On 26 September 2019 Espanyol confirmed, that Aokai had joined UA Horta on loan for the rest of the season. On 29 July 2020 he returned to China with Shijiazhuang Ever Bright (now known as Cangzhou Mighty Lions) initially on loan before making the move permanent.

== Personal life ==
Zhang Aokai's original name was Zhang OK; however, his given name violated the Name Registration Ordinance of the People's Republic of China; and thus, he could not apply for an identification card. Zhang's father changed his given name to Aokai, which shares a similar pronunciation with OK.

== Career statistics ==
As of 31 December 2022.

Appearances and goals by club, season and competition
Club	Season	League			National Cup		Continental		Other		Total	
Club	Season	Division	Apps	Goals	Apps	Goals	Apps	Goals	Apps	Goals	Apps	Goals
Guangzhou Evergrande	2016	Chinese Super League	1	0	0	0	0	0	0 (Note: Appearance(s) in Chinese FA Super Cup)	0	1	0
Espanyol B	2019–20	Segunda División B	0	0	-		-		-		0	0
Horta (loan)	2019–20	Tercera División	2	0	0	0	-		-		2	0
Shijiazhuang Ever Bright (loan)	2020	Chinese Super League	0	0	0	0	-		-		0	0
Cangzhou Mighty Lions	2021	Chinese Super League	0	0	0	0	-		-		0	0
Jiangxi Dark Horse Junior (loan)	2022	China League Two	14	4	-		-		-		14	4
Career total			17	4	0	0	0	0	0	0	17	4

== Honours ==
=== Club ===
Guangzhou Evergrande

- Chinese Super League: 2016
- Chinese FA Cup: 2016
