= Chen Zeng =

Chinese association football player

Personal information
- Date of birth: 6 April 1994 (age 32)
- Place of birth: Nanning, Guangxi, China
- Height: 1.72 m (5 ft 8 in)
- Position: Midfielder

Team information
- Current team: Xiamen Feilu
- Number: 8

Youth career
- 2014–2015: Mafra

Senior career*
Years	Team	Apps	(Gls)
2013	Liaoning Youth	9	(0)
2014	Shenyang Dongjin	0	(0)
2015	Shijiazhuang Ever Bright	0	(0)
2016–2018	Shenyang Dongjin	36	(1)
2019–2022	Shijiazhuang Ever Bright	3	(0)
2021	→ Guangxi Pingguo Haliao (loan)	18	(0)
2022	→ Zibo Cuju (loan)	11	(0)
2023	Guangxi Pingguo Haliao	10	(0)
2024	Xiamen 1026	11	(0)
2025	Quanzhou Yassin	22	(1)
2026–	Xiamen Feilu	11	(0)

Managerial career
- 2025: Quanzhou Yassin (assistant)
- 2026–: Xiamen Feilu (assistant)
- * Club domestic league appearances and goals as of 9 March 2026

Chen Zeng (simplified Chinese: 陈曾; traditional Chinese: 陳曾; pinyin: Chén Zēng; born 6 April 1994), born Chen Cheng (simplified Chinese: 陈程; traditional Chinese: 陳程; pinyin: Chén Chéng) and known as Chen Zengtailang (simplified Chinese: 陈曾太郎; traditional Chinese: 陳曾太郎; pinyin: Chén Zēngtàiláng), is a Chinese footballer currently playing as a midfielder and assistant coach for China League Two club Xiamen Feilu.

== Club career ==
Chen Zeng would play for the Liaoning U18 team in the 2013 National Games of China. The Liaoning football association would create a team called Liaoning Youth to participate within the 2013 China League Two campaign and used the players from the 2013 National Games of China. The following season he would join Shenyang Dongjin before going abroad to Portugal to join Mafra to continue his football development. He would return to China and join Shijiazhuang Ever Bright; however, it would be discovered by the Chinese Football Association on 20 March 2015 that he had lied about his age and suspended him from playing until 27 February 2016.

After completing his suspension he would rejoin Shenyang Dongjin for three seasons before joining Shijiazhuang Ever Bright again. On 19 September 2020 he would make his debut for Shijiazhuang Ever Bright in a Chinese FA Cup game against Tianjin TEDA in a 2–0 defeat.

== Career statistics ==
As of 10 October 2023.

Club	Season	League			Cup		Continental		Other		Total	
Club	Season	Division	Apps	Goals	Apps	Goals	Apps	Goals	Apps	Goals	Apps	Goals
Liaoning Youth	2013	China League Two	9	0	0	0	–		–		9	0
Shenyang Dongjin	2014	China League Two	0	0	0	0	–		–		0	0
Shijiazhuang Ever Bright	2015	Chinese Super League	0	0	0	0	–		–		0	0
Shenyang Dongjin	2016	China League Two	4	0	0	0	–		2 (Note: Appearances in the China League Two playoffs)	0	6	0
Shenyang Dongjin	2017	China League Two	18	0	1	0	–		4	0	23	0
Shenyang Dongjin	2018	China League Two	14	1	2 (Note: Appearances in the Chinese FA Cup)	0	–		0	0	16	1
Shenyang Dongjin	Total		36	1	3	0	0	0	6	0	45	1
Shijiazhuang Ever Bright	2019	China League One	0	0	0	0	–		–		0	0
Shijiazhuang Ever Bright	2020	Chinese Super League	2	0	1	0	–		–		3	0
Shijiazhuang Ever Bright	2022	Chinese Super League	1	0	0	0	–		–		1	0
Shijiazhuang Ever Bright	Total		3	0	1	0	0	0	0	0	4	0
Guangxi Pingguo Haliao (loan)	2021	China League Two	18	0	2	0	–		2 (Note: Appearances in the China League One relegation playoffs)	0	22	0
Zibo Cuju (loan)	2022	China League One	11	0	0	0	–		–		11	0
Guangxi Pingguo Haliao	2023	China League One	10	0	1	0	–		–		11	0
Career total			87	1	7	0	0	0	8	0	102	1
