= Wu Yaoshengxuan =

Chinese association football player

Personal information
- Date of birth: 7 November 1998 (age 28)
- Place of birth: Xuzhou, Jiangsu, China
- Height: 1.86 m (6 ft 1 in)
- Position: Goalkeeper

Team information
- Current team: Shanghai Mitsubishi

Youth career
- 2015–2017: Shijiazhuang Ever Bright

Senior career*
Years	Team	Apps	(Gls)
2018–2020	Zhejiang Yiteng	2	(0)
2021–2022	Nantong Zhiyun	0	(0)
2022–	Shanghai Mitsubishi	0	(0)
- * Club domestic league appearances and goals as of 14:01, 31 December 2022 (UTC)

Wu Yaoshengxuan (Chinese: 吴姚盛暄; born 7 November 1998) is a Chinese footballer currently playing as a goalkeeper for Shanghai Mitsubishi.

== Club career ==
Wu Yaoshengxuan would play for the Shijiazhuang Ever Bright youth team before joining second tier Zhejiang Yiteng on 12 July 2018. Initially utilized as a reserve goalkeeper he would unfortunately be part of the squad that was relegated at the end of the 2018 China League One season. After three seasons with the club he would join second tier club Nantong Zhiyun on 6 April 2021. He would be part of the squad that helped the club gain promotion to the top tier at the end of the 2022 China League One season.

== Career statistics ==
As of 31 December 2022.

Club	Season	League			Cup		Continental		Other		Total	
Club	Season	Division	Apps	Goals	Apps	Goals	Apps	Goals	Apps	Goals	Apps	Goals
Shaoxing Keqiao Yuejia	2018	China League One	0	0	0	0	–		–		0	0
Shaoxing Keqiao Yuejia	2019	China League Two	2	0	0	0	–		–		2	0
Shaoxing Keqiao Yuejia	2020	China League Two	2	0	0	0	–		–		2	0
Shaoxing Keqiao Yuejia	Total		4	0	0	0	0	0	0	0	4	0
Nantong Zhiyun	2021	China League One	0	0	1	0	–		–		1	0
Nantong Zhiyun	2022	China League One	0	0	0	0	–		–		0	0
Nantong Zhiyun	Total		0	0	1	0	0	0	0	0	1	0
Career total			4	0	1	0	0	0	0	0	5	0
