= Xu Wu (footballer, born 1993) =

Chinese footballer (born 1993)

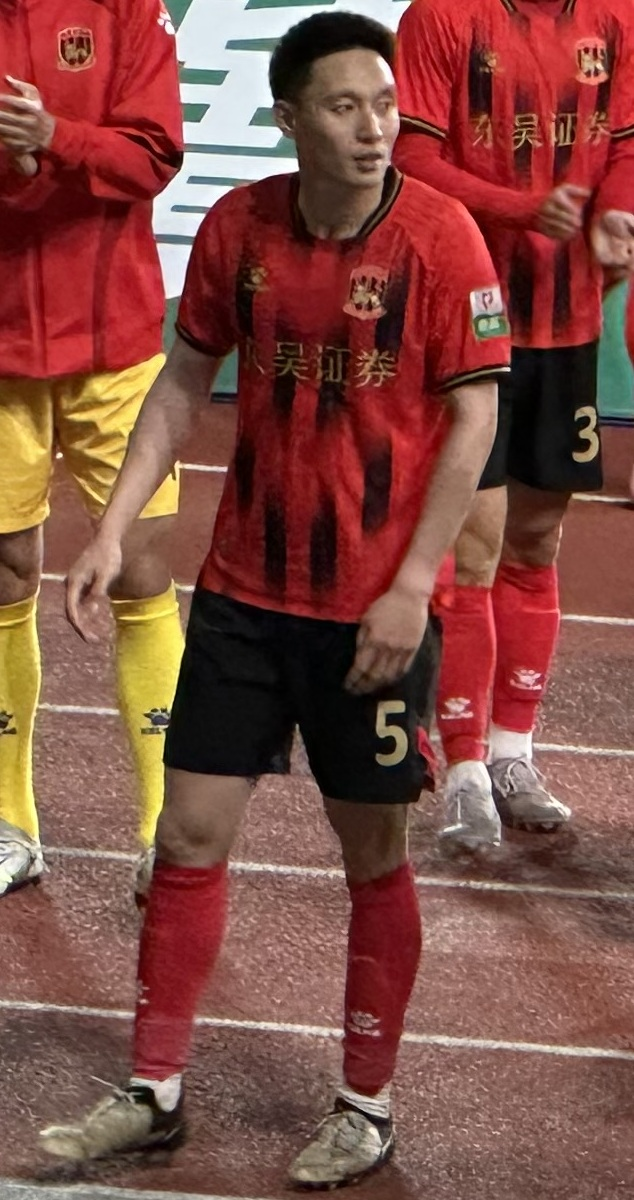
- Xu Wu with Suzhou Dongwu in 2025

Personal information
- Date of birth: 9 March 1993 (age 33)
- Place of birth: Qingdao, China
- Height: 1.83 m (6 ft 0 in)
- Position: Defender

Youth career
- –2017: Shanghai Greenland Shenhua
- 2017–2019: Chongqing Lifan

Senior career*
| Years | Team | Apps | (Gls) |
| 2019–2021 | Chongqing Liangjiang Athletic | 21 | (0) |
| 2022 | Sichuan Jiuniu | 4 | (0) |
| 2022 | → Guangxi Pingguo Haliao (loan) | 5 | (0) |
| 2023 | Nantong Zhiyun | 3 | (0) |
| 2023 | → Heilongjiang Ice City (loan) | 13 | (0) |
| 2024–2025 | Suzhou Dongwu | 44 | (0) |
| Total | | 90 | (0) |
- * Club domestic league appearances and goals

Xu Wu (Chinese: 徐武; born 9 March 1993) is a Chinese former professional footballer who played as a defender.

== Club career ==
Xu Wu was promoted to the senior team of Chongqing Lifan within the 2019 Chinese Super League season and would make his debut in league game on 17 July 2019 against Shenzhen F.C. in a 2–0 victory where he came on as a substitute for Peng Xinli. Xu would gradually start to established himself as regular within the team until the club was dissolved on 24 May 2022 due to financial difficulties.

He would join second tier club Sichuan Jiuniu on a free transfer at the beginning of the 2022 China League One campaign before having a loan spell with Guangxi Pingguo Haliao. His contract was not renewed for the following campaign and he joined newly promoted top tier club Nantong Zhiyun for the 2023 Chinese Super League. After only a handful of games he was loaned out to second division club Heilongjiang Ice City before his contract ended and he joined Suzhou Dongwu on permanent contract. After the 2025 season, Xu decided to retire from professional football on 26 February 2026.

== Career statistics ==
As of 30 January 2026.

| Club | Season | League | | | Cup | | Continental | | Other | | Total | |
| Club | Season | Division | Apps | Goals | Apps | Goals | Apps | Goals | Apps | Goals | Apps | Goals |
|---|---|---|---|---|---|---|---|---|---|---|---|---|
| Chongqing Liangjiang Athletic | 2019 | Chinese Super League | 3 | 0 | 0 | 0 | – | | 0 | 0 | 3 | 0 |
| Chongqing Liangjiang Athletic | 2020 | Chinese Super League | 3 | 0 | 1 | 0 | – | | 0 | 0 | 4 | 0 |
| Chongqing Liangjiang Athletic | 2021 | Chinese Super League | 15 | 0 | 1 | 0 | – | | 0 | 0 | 16 | 0 |
| Chongqing Liangjiang Athletic | Total | | 21 | 0 | 2 | 0 | 0 | 0 | 0 | 0 | 23 | 0 |
| Sichuan Jiuniu | 2022 | China League One | 4 | 0 | 1 | 0 | – | | 0 | 0 | 5 | 0 |
| Guangxi Pingguo Haliao (loan) | 2022 | China League One | 5 | 0 | 0 | 0 | – | | 0 | 0 | 5 | 0 |
| Nantong Zhiyun | 2023 | Chinese Super League | 3 | 0 | 0 | 0 | – | | 0 | 0 | 3 | 0 |
| Heilongjiang Ice City (loan) | 2023 | China League One | 13 | 0 | 0 | 0 | – | | 0 | 0 | 13 | 0 |
| Suzhou Dongwu | 2024 | China League One | 23 | 0 | 1 | 0 | – | | 0 | 0 | 24 | 0 |
| Suzhou Dongwu | 2025 | China League One | 21 | 0 | 1 | 0 | – | | 0 | 0 | 22 | 0 |
| Suzhou Dongwu | Total | | 44 | 0 | 2 | 0 | 0 | 0 | 0 | 0 | 46 | 0 |
| Career total | | | 90 | 0 | 5 | 0 | 0 | 0 | 0 | 0 | 95 | 0 |
