= List of Chinese football transfers winter 2024 =

This is a list of Chinese football transfers for the 2024 season winter transfer window. Only transfers featuring the Chinese Super League and China League One are listed. The winter transfer window for the Chinese Super League and China League One opened on 4 January 2024 and closed on 28 February 2024.

== Super League ==
Note: Flags indicate national team as has been defined under FIFA eligibility rules. Players may hold more than one non-FIFA nationality.

=== Beijing Guoan ===
In:

No.	Pos.	Nation	Player
2	DF	MLI	Mamadou Traoré (from (Qatar) Muaither)
3	DF	CHN	He Yupeng (from Dalian Pro)
8	MF	POR	Guga (from (Portugal) Rio Ave)
11	MF	CHN	Lin Liangming (from Dalian Pro)
24	FW	NGA	Samuel Adegbenro (loan return from (Norway) Viking)
37	MF	CHN	Cao Yongjing (loan return from Changchun Yatai)
40	DF	CHN	Zhang Yixuan (from Hubei Istar)
—	FW	CRO	Marko Dabro (loan return from (Latvia) Riga)
—	GK	CHN	Guo Quanbo (loan return from Meizhou Hakka)
—	DF	CHN	He Xiaoqiang (loan return from Qingdao West Coast)
—	MF	CHN	Hu Jiaqi (loan return from Beijing IT)
—	FW	CHN	Li Boxi (loan return from Wuxi Wugo)
—	GK	CHN	Ma Kunyue (loan return from Jiangxi Lushan)
—	MF	CHN	Ma Yujun (loan return from Nanjing City)
—	MF	CHN	Shi Yucheng (loan return from Suzhou Dongwu)
—	FW	CHN	Tian Yuda (loan return from Changchun Yatai)
—	FW	CHN	Xie Longfei (loan return from Qingdao West Coast)
—	DF	CHN	Yang Fan (loan return from Tianjin Jinmen Tiger)

Out:

No.	Pos.	Nation	Player
5	MF	BRA	Josef de Souza (to (Turkey) İstanbul Başakşehir)
8	MF	CHN	Piao Cheng (retired)
14	GK	CHN	Zou Dehai (to Changchun Yatai)
15	MF	CHN	Gao Tianyi (to Shanghai Shenhua)
39	FW	CHN	Yan Yu (on loan to Heilongjiang Ice City)
44	MF	CHN	Duan Dezhi (on loan to Suzhou Dongwu)
—	FW	CRO	Marko Dabro (to (Croatia) Varaždin)
—	GK	CHN	Guo Quanbo (to Meizhou Hakka)
—	DF	CHN	He Xiaoqiang (on loan to Dalian Young Boy)
—	MF	CHN	Hu Jiaqi (to Jiangxi Lushan)
—	FW	CHN	Li Boxi (on loan to Wuxi Wugo)
—	GK	CHN	Ma Kunyue (to Jiangxi Lushan)
—	MF	CHN	Ma Yujun (on loan to Heilongjiang Ice City)
—	FW	CHN	Tian Yuda (to Changchun Yatai)
—	FW	CHN	Xie Longfei (to Langfang Glory City)
—	DF	CHN	Yang Fan (to Chengdu Rongcheng)

=== Cangzhou Mighty Lions ===
In:

No.	Pos.	Nation	Player
3	DF	ZAM	Stoppila Sunzu (from Jinan Xingzhou)
7	FW	CHN	Zheng Dalun (from Shenzhen)
8	MF	CHN	Zhao Yingjie (from Tianjin Jinmen Tiger)
9	FW	BRA	Héber (from (United States) Seattle Sounders)
11	MF	CHN	Dilyimit Tudi (on loan from Changchun Yatai)
17	FW	CHN	Wen Da (from Qingdao Red Lions)
23	DF	CHN	Li Hong (from Changchun Yatai)
31	FW	ENG	Viv Solomon-Otabor (from (Ukraine) Rukh Lviv)
32	FW	HKG	Sun Ming Him (from (Hong Kong) Eastern)
33	MF	CHN	Hu Jiali (from Heilongjiang Ice City)
37	GK	CHN	Dong Hang (from Qingdao West Coast)

Out:

No.	Pos.	Nation	Player
2	DF	CHN	Li Peng (to Yunnan Yukun)
3	DF	CHN	Zhao Honglüe (to Qingdao West Coast)
8	MF	CHN	Lin Chuangyi (to Shenzhen Peng City)
9	FW	CUW	Jürgen Locadia (to (Spain) Amorebieta)
17	DF	CHN	Piao Shihao (to Qingdao West Coast)
21	DF	CRO	Mile Škorić (to Tianjin Jinmen Tiger)
24	FW	CHN	He Youzu (free agent)
25	MF	CHN	Zhang Yue (free agent)
28	DF	CHN	Yang Xiaotian (free agent)
30	DF	CHN	Liu Yang (to Guangxi Pingguo Haliao)
31	FW	NED	Deabeas Owusu-Sekyere (to Zhejiang)
33	MF	CHN	Zhang Xiangshuo (to Foshan Nanshi)

=== Changchun Yatai ===
In:

No.	Pos.	Nation	Player
3	DF	CHN	Wang Yaopeng (from Dalian Pro)
4	DF	SRB	Lazar Rosić (from (Serbia) Vojvodina)
5	DF	CHN	Li Shenyuan (on loan from Shanghai Port)
6	MF	CHN	Zhang Huachen (from Shanghai Port)
9	FW	SVN	Robert Berić (from Tianjin Jinmen Tiger)
15	FW	CHN	Tian Yuda (from Beijing Guoan)
32	DF	CHN	Sun Guoliang (from Nanjing City)
35	MF	CHN	Wang Yu (from Dalian Pro)
40	MF	BRA	Guilherme (from (Brazil) Goiás)
42	GK	CHN	Zou Dehai (from Beijing Guoan)
—	MF	CHN	Abdulla Adil (loan return from Suzhou Dongwu)
—	DF	CHN	Sun Jie (loan return from Qingdao West Coast)
—	MF	CHN	Dilyimit Tudi (loan return from Henan)
—	DF	CHN	Zheng Zhiyun (loan return from Nantong Zhiyun)

Out:

No.	Pos.	Nation	Player
3	FW	CHN	Bi Jinhao (to Shandong Taishan)
4	DF	DEN	Jores Okore (free agent)
5	DF	CHN	Sun Jie (on loan to Qingdao West Coast)
15	FW	CHN	Tian Yuda (loan return to Beijing Guoan)
17	DF	CHN	Li Hong (to Cangzhou Mighty Lions)
26	DF	CHN	Yi Teng (to Yunnan Yukun)
31	DF	CHN	Shi Lishan (on loan to Nanjing City)
32	FW	SRB	Nenad Lukić (to (Hungary) Győr)
36	FW	CHN	Fan Chao (on loan to Guangxi Pingguo Haliao)
37	MF	CHN	Cao Yongjing (loan return to Beijing Guoan)
38	GK	CHN	Lu Ning (on loan to Heilongjiang Ice City)
—	MF	CHN	Huang Yushen (on loan to Foshan Nanshi)
—	MF	CHN	Li Jiaqi (to Guangxi Pingguo Haliao)
—	MF	CHN	Tian De'ao (to Liaoning Tieren)
—	MF	CHN	Dilyimit Tudi (on loan to Cangzhou Mighty Lions)
—	MF	CHN	Yang Erhai (to Yanbian Longding)
—	MF	CHN	Yang Xun'ange (to Guizhou Zhucheng Athletic)

=== Chengdu Rongcheng ===
In:

No.	Pos.	Nation	Player
4	DF	NED	Timo Letschert (from (South Korea) Gwangju)
7	FW	CHN	Wei Shihao (from Wuhan Three Towns)
11	DF	ISR	Yahav Gurfinkel (from (Israel) Hapoel Tel Aviv)
15	MF	CHN	Yan Dinghao (from Wuhan Three Towns)
17	MF	CHN	Wu Lei (from Suzhou Dongwu)
22	DF	CHN	Li Yang (from Wuhan Three Towns)
25	MF	CHN	Mirahmetjan Muzepper (from Shanghai Port)
27	DF	CHN	Yang Fan (from Beijing Guoan)
28	DF	CHN	Yang Shuai (from Henan)
36	DF	CHN	Chen Guoliang (from Shenzhen)
37	FW	CHN	Bughrahan Iskandar (from Guangzhou)
—	DF	CHN	Gong Hankui (loan return from Yanbian Longding)
—	MF	CHN	Han Guanghui (loan return from Yanbian Longding)
—	DF	CHN	Han Xuan (loan return from Nanjing City)
—	MF	CHN	Hu Mingtian (loan return from Dandong Tengyue)
—	GK	CHN	Xing Yu (loan return from Nanjing City)
—	DF	CHN	Yang Ting (loan return from Chongqing Tonglianglong)
—	MF	CHN	Zhou Yunyi (loan return from Chongqing Tonglianglong)

Out:

No.	Pos.	Nation	Player
4	MF	CHN	Zhang Gong (free agent)
11	MF	KOR	Kim Min-woo (to (South Korea) Ulsan HD)
13	DF	CHN	Hu Jing (to Chongqing Tonglianglong)
15	MF	CHN	Wu Guichao (free agent)
17	DF	CHN	Gan Rui (retired)
22	MF	CHN	Wang Chu (to Shenzhen Peng City)
27	DF	CHN	Liu Bin (to Henan)
36	DF	CHN	Gou Junchen (to Langfang Glory City)
40	DF	AUT	Richard Windbichler (to (United States) San Antonio)
—	DF	CHN	Gong Hankui (to Nanjing City)
—	MF	CHN	Han Guanghui (to Yanbian Longding)
—	DF	CHN	Han Xuan (free agent)
—	MF	CHN	Hu Mingtian (to Shaanxi Union)
—	MF	CHN	Min Junlin (free agent)
—	DF	CHN	Yang Ting (free agent)

=== Henan ===
In:

No.	Pos.	Nation	Player
3	DF	HKG	Oliver Gerbig (from (Hong Kong) Kitchee)
11	FW	GHA	Frank Acheampong (from Shenzhen)
13	DF	CHN	Xu Haofeng (from Shenzhen)
15	DF	CHN	Liu Bin (from Chengdu Rongcheng)
16	DF	CHN	Yang Kuo (from Wuhan Three Towns)
17	GK	CHN	Wang Jinshuai (from Dalian Pro)
19	MF	CHN	Yang Yilin (from Meizhou Hakka)
22	DF	CHN	Huang Ruifeng (from Shenzhen)
26	GK	CHN	Xu Jiamin (from Tianjin Jinmen Tiger)
33	DF	CHN	Zhang Zhihao (from Jiangxi Dark Horse Junior)
36	DF	BRA	Iago Maidana (from (Brazil) América Mineiro)
38	FW	CHN	Huang Yonghai (on loan from Shanghai Port)
40	MF	BRA	Bruno Nazário (from (Brazil) Chapecoense)

Out:

No.	Pos.	Nation	Player
3	DF	CHN	Yang Shuai (to Chengdu Rongcheng)
4	DF	CHN	Luo Xin (to Nantong Zhiyun)
10	MF	POL	Adrian Mierzejewski (retired)
12	DF	CHN	Yang Minjie (loan return to Wuhan Three Towns)
13	GK	CHN	Peng Peng (to Shenzhen Peng City)
14	FW	CHN	Gao Tianyu (loan return to Zhejiang)
16	MF	CHN	Dilyimit Tudi (loan return to Changchun Yatai)
18	DF	CHN	Zhao Yuhao (to Yunnan Yukun)
22	MF	CHN	Wang Haoran (on loan to Nanjing City)
23	DF	BIH	Toni Šunjić (to (Bosnia and Herzegovina) Zrinjski Mostar)
26	DF	CHN	Liu Jiahui (on loan to Nanjing City)
28	FW	CHN	Song Runtong (on loan to Foshan Nanshi)
31	FW	CPV	Hildeberto Pereira (to (Portugal) Portimonense)
33	DF	CHN	Dilmurat Mawlanyaz (to Yunnan Yukun)

=== Meizhou Hakka ===
In:

No.	Pos.	Nation	Player
5	DF	CHN	Tian Ziyi (from Shenzhen)
9	FW	CMR	Rooney Eva Wankewai (from (Bulgaria) CSKA 1948)
11	DF	CRO	Darick Kobie Morris (from (Slovenia) Mura)
14	MF	CHN	Li Ning (from Shenzhen)
20	DF	CHN	Wang Jianan (from Tianjin Jinmen Tiger)
36	DF	CHN	Zhang Sijie (loan return from Foshan Nanshi)
41	GK	CHN	Guo Quanbo (from Beijing Guoan)
—	MF	CHN	Chen Guokang (loan return from Guangzhou)
—	MF	CHN	Guo Yi (loan return from Qingdao West Coast)

Out:

No.	Pos.	Nation	Player
2	DF	CHN	Wen Junjie (to Foshan Nanshi)
19	MF	CHN	Yang Yilin (to Henan)
20	DF	SRB	Rade Dugalić (to Shenzhen Peng City)
26	GK	CHN	Guo Quanbo (loan return to Beijing Guoan)
44	MF	SVN	Andrej Kotnik (on loan to Dalian Young Boy)

=== Nantong Zhiyun ===
In:

No.	Pos.	Nation	Player
7	FW	COD	Mayingila Nzuzi Mata (from (Turkey) Tuzlaspor)
8	MF	CHN	Zhang Yuhao (free transfer)
9	FW	MEX	Jesús Godínez (from (Costa Rica) Herediano)
10	FW	SLE	Issa Kallon (from Shanghai Port)
11	MF	CHN	Nuali Zimin (from Dandong Tengyue)
13	DF	CHN	Song Haoyu (loan return from Shijiazhuang Gongfu)
14	GK	CHN	Chen Zhao (from Qingdao West Coast)
17	FW	CHN	Ji Shengpan (on loan from Zhejiang)
20	DF	NGA	Izuchukwu Anthony (from (Serbia) Radnički Kragujevac)
23	GK	CHN	Xue Qinghao (on loan from Shanghai Shenhua)
26	DF	CHN	Ye Daochi (loan return from Wuxi Wugo)
31	DF	CHN	Liao Lei (from Shenzhen)
34	DF	CHN	Luo Xin (from Henan)
38	MF	CHN	Lu Yongtao (on loan from Shandong Taishan)
—	DF	SRB	Stefan Veličković (from (Bosnia and Herzegovina) Zvijezda 09)
—	MF	CHN	Kamiran Halimurat (loan return from Shijiazhuang Gongfu)
—	DF	CHN	Xu Wu (loan return from Heilongjiang Ice City)

Out:

No.	Pos.	Nation	Player
8	MF	BRA	Lucas Morelatto (free agent)
9	FW	HON	Rubilio Castillo (to (Honduras) Motagua)
11	FW	GNB	Romário Baldé (to Wuhan Three Towns)
14	DF	BRA	Bressan (to (Greece) OFI)
17	MF	CHN	Kamiran Halimurat (free agent)
18	FW	MTN	Oumar Camara (free agent)
19	DF	CHN	Liu Huan (to Shijiazhuang Gongfu)
21	DF	ESP	David Wang (free agent)
27	DF	CHN	Xu Wu (to Suzhou Dongwu)
28	FW	CHN	Gui Hong (to Shijiazhuang Gongfu)
31	MF	CHN	Xue Tian (free agent)
32	GK	CHN	Xue Qinghao (loan return to Shanghai Shenhua)
33	MF	CHN	Wang Song (to Shijiazhuang Gongfu)
34	DF	CHN	Zheng Zhiyun (loan return to Changchun Yatai)
35	GK	CHN	Guo Tong (to Suzhou Dongwu)
44	FW	CHN	Ruan Yang (to Shenzhen Peng City)
45	DF	CHN	Zhang Yu (to Nanjing City)

=== Qingdao Hainiu ===
In:

No.	Pos.	Nation	Player
4	DF	MNE	Miloš Milović (from (Uzbekistan) Navbahor)
11	FW	ITA	Martin Boakye (from (Uzbekistan) AGMK)
13	GK	CHN	Cao Zheng (from Shandong Taishan)
16	DF	CHN	Li Hailong (from Shandong Taishan)
17	FW	CHN	Hu Jinghang (from Shandong Taishan)
18	DF	CHN	Wang Zihao (from Jinan Xingzhou)
20	MF	BRA	Diego Lopes (from (Singapore) Lion City Sailors)
38	FW	CHN	Zhang Wei (on loan from Shanghai Shenhua)
—	FW	CHN	Chen Jiaqi (loan return from Chongqing Tonglianglong)
—	MF	CHN	Gao Yixuan (loan return from Qingdao Red Lions)
—	FW	CHN	Sun Xipeng (loan return from Qingdao Red Lions)
—	DF	CHN	Sun Xu (loan return from Qingdao Red Lions)
—	FW	CHN	Wang Tao (loan return from Heilongjiang Ice City)
—	MF	CHN	Xu Jiajun (loan return from Heilongjiang Ice City)
—	GK	CHN	Zhu Quan (loan return from Qingdao Red Lions)

Out:

No.	Pos.	Nation	Player
2	DF	CHN	Zhang Wei (loan return to Shanghai Port)
9	FW	CRC	Felicio Brown Forbes (to (India) East Bengal)
11	FW	CHN	Sun Xipeng (to Chongqing Tonglianglong)
14	FW	CHN	Feng Jin (loan return to Shanghai Port)
17	DF	CHN	Fu Yuncheng (to Dalian Young Boy)
18	FW	CHN	Hu Ming (to Shenzhen Juniors)
20	MF	CHN	Peng Xinli (loan return to Shanghai Shenhua)
31	DF	SRB	Aleksandar Andrejević (to Chongqing Tonglianglong)
45	FW	SRB	Marko Šarić (to (Serbia) Javor Ivanjica)
—	MF	CHN	Hao Haiyi (loan return to Shandong Taishan)
—	DF	CHN	Zhang Jiaxin (to Guizhou Zhucheng Athletic)
—	GK	CHN	Zhu Quan (free agent)

=== Qingdao West Coast ===
In:

No.	Pos.	Nation	Player
1	GK	CHN	Ji Jiabao (from Shenzhen)
2	DF	CHN	Song Bowei (from Shandong Taishan)
3	DF	CHN	Zhao Honglüe (from Cangzhou Mighty Lions)
9	FW	COL	Brayan Riascos (from (Ukraine) Metalist Kharkiv)
10	FW	ANG	Nélson da Luz (on loan from (Portugal) Vitória de Guimarães)
11	FW	CHN	Alan (free transfer)
13	MF	CHN	Tan Kaiyuan (from (Spain) Espanyol)
16	FW	CHN	Chen Xiangyu (from Shenzhen)
18	DF	CHN	Piao Shihao (from Cangzhou Mighty Lions)
19	FW	FRA	Jean-David Beauguel (from (Saudi Arabia) Al Wehda)
21	FW	CHN	Liu Ziming (from Liaoning Tieren)
23	MF	BRA	Eduardo Henrique (from (Portugal) Sporting CP)
24	MF	CHN	Duan Liuyu (on loan from Shandong Taishan)
25	DF	CHN	Pei Shuai (from Shenzhen)
27	DF	CHN	Yang Boyu (from Shenzhen)
28	GK	CHN	Yerjet Yerzat (from Heilongjiang Ice City)
29	FW	CHN	Gao Tianyu (on loan from Zhejiang)
30	MF	CHN	He Longhai (on loan from Shanghai Shenhua)
33	DF	ARM	Varazdat Haroyan (from (Kazakhstan) Astana)
35	GK	CHN	Shi Xiaotian (from Jiangxi Lushan)
36	DF	CHN	Sun Jie (on loan from Changchun Yatai)
39	FW	CHN	Lei Wenjie (on loan from Shanghai Port)
—	DF	CHN	Du Junpeng (from Tai'an Tiankuang)
—	MF	CHN	Piao Taoyu (from Tianjin Jinmen Tiger)
—	DF	CHN	Chen Fuhai (loan return from Qingdao Red Lions)
—	DF	CHN	Han Xuan (loan return from Qingdao Red Lions)
—	MF	CHN	Li Guihao (loan return from Qingdao Red Lions)

Out:

No.	Pos.	Nation	Player
1	GK	CHN	Dong Hang (to Cangzhou Mighty Lions)
9	FW	CHN	Shi Jian (on loan to Shanghai Jiading Huilong)
10	MF	COL	Juan Pablo Ramírez (loan return to (Colombia) Atlético Nacional)
11	FW	BRA	Raniel (to (United Arab Emirates) Khor Fakkan)
12	GK	CHN	Chen Zhao (to Nantong Zhiyun)
19	MF	CHN	Guo Yi (loan return to Meizhou Hakka)
24	FW	BRA	Wesley Tanque (to (Bolivia) Always Ready)
26	DF	CHN	He Xiaoqiang (loan return to Beijing Guoan)
28	FW	BRA	Orlando Berrío (to (Paraguay) Tacuary)
30	MF	CHN	Gui Zihan (loan return to Dalian Pro)
36	DF	CHN	Sun Jie (loan return to Changchun Yatai)
39	FW	CHN	Lei Wenjie (loan return to Shanghai Port)
42	MF	CHN	Gao Yunan (to Wuhan Three Towns)
43	FW	CHN	Xie Longfei (loan return to Beijing Guoan)
—	DF	CHN	Du Junpeng (on loan to Jiangxi Lushan)
—	MF	CHN	Li Guihao (to Shanghai Jiading Huilong)
—	MF	CHN	Piao Taoyu (on loan to Heilongjiang Ice City)

=== Shandong Taishan ===
In:

No.	Pos.	Nation	Player
8	MF	POR	Pedro Delgado (loan return from Suzhou Dongwu)
10	MF	GEO	Valeri Qazaishvili (from (South Korea) Ulsan HD)
24	FW	CHN	Bi Jinhao (from Changchun Yatai)
25	MF	CHN	Peng Xinli (from Shanghai Shenhua)
33	DF	CHN	Gao Zhunyi (from Wuhan Three Towns)
—	FW	BRA	Zeca (from (South Korea) Pohang Steelers)
—	FW	CHN	Behram Abduweli (loan return from Shenzhen Peng City)
—	GK	CHN	Cao Zheng (loan return from Tai'an Tiankuang)
—	MF	CHN	Duan Liuyu (loan return from Wuhan Three Towns)
—	MF	CHN	Hao Haiyi (loan return from Qingdao Hainiu)
—	GK	CHN	Li Guanxi (loan return from Heilongjiang Ice City)
—	MF	CHN	Lu Yongtao (loan return from Jinan Xingzhou)
—	DF	CHN	Song Bowei (loan return from Shijiazhuang Gongfu)
—	FW	BRA	Léo Souza (loan return from Zhejiang)
—	MF	CHN	Yi Xianlong (loan return from Jinan Xingzhou)

Out:

No.	Pos.	Nation	Player
10	MF	BRA	Moisés (to (Brazil) América Mineiro)
16	DF	CHN	Li Hailong (to Qingdao Hainiu)
19	DF	CHN	Sun Guowen (on loan to Zhejiang)
24	FW	CHN	Hu Jinghang (to Qingdao Hainiu)
25	MF	BEL	Marouane Fellaini (retired)
36	MF	CHN	Duan Liuyu (on loan to Qingdao West Coast)
—	FW	CHN	Behram Abduweli (to Shenzhen Peng City)
—	GK	CHN	Cao Zheng (to Qingdao Hainiu)
—	MF	CHN	Chen Zhexuan (on loan to Shijiazhuang Gongfu)
—	GK	CHN	Li Guanxi (on loan to Shijiazhuang Gongfu)
—	MF	CHN	Lu Yongtao (on loan to Nantong Zhiyun)
—	DF	CHN	Song Bowei (to Qingdao West Coast)
—	FW	BRA	Léo Souza (on loan to Zhejiang)
—	GK	CHN	Sun Qihang (on loan to Chongqing Tonglianglong)
—	DF	CHN	Mustapa Tash (on loan to Chongqing Tonglianglong)
—	DF	CHN	Yang Ruiqi (on loan to Shaanxi Union)
—	MF	CHN	Yi Xianlong (on loan to Guangxi Pingguo Haliao)

=== Shanghai Port ===
In:

No.	Pos.	Nation	Player
9	FW	BRA	Gustavo (from (South Korea) Jeonbuk Hyundai Motors)
17	FW	TPE	Will Donkin (from Shenzhen)
18	MF	BRA	Léo Cittadini (on loan from (Brazil) Bahia)
19	DF	CHN	Wang Zhen'ao (from Dalian Pro)
22	MF	BRA	Matheus Jussa (from (Brazil) Fortaleza)
27	FW	CHN	Feng Jin (loan return from Qingdao Hainiu)
28	DF	CHN	He Guan (loan return from Wuhan Three Towns)
39	FW	CHN	Lei Wenjie (loan return from Qingdao West Coast)
—	MF	CHN	Sun Enming (loan return from Wuxi Wugo)
—	DF	CHN	Zhang Wei (loan return from Qingdao Hainiu)
—	MF	CHN	Zhang Yi (loan return from Jinan Xingzhou)

Out:

No.	Pos.	Nation	Player
10	FW	AUT	Markus Pink (to (Germany) SV Sandhausen)
15	DF	CHN	Li Shenyuan (on loan to Changchun Yatai)
18	FW	ANG	Lucas João ( (Qatar) Umm Salal)
21	DF	CHN	Yu Hai (retired)
25	MF	CHN	Mirahmetjan Muzepper (to Chengdu Rongcheng)
29	MF	CHN	Zhang Huachen (to Changchun Yatai)
34	FW	SLE	Issa Kallon (to Nantong Zhiyun)
36	MF	CHN	Ablahan Haliq (on loan to Wuhan Three Towns)
—	FW	CHN	Huang Yonghai (on loan to Henan)
—	FW	CHN	Lei Wenjie (on loan to Qingdao West Coast)
—	DF	CHN	Xiang Rongjun (on loan to Suzhou Dongwu)
—	DF	CHN	Zhang Wei (to Shenzhen Peng City)
—	MF	CHN	Zhang Yi (free agent)

=== Shanghai Shenhua ===
In:

No.	Pos.	Nation	Player
9	FW	BRA	André Luis (from (Portugal) Moreirense)
13	DF	POR	Wilson Manafá (from (Spain) Granada)
14	MF	CHN	Xie Pengfei (from Wuhan Three Towns)
17	MF	CHN	Gao Tianyi (from Beijing Guoan)
—	MF	CHN	Peng Xinli (loan return from Qingdao Hainiu)
—	DF	CHN	Jiang Zhixin (loan return from Wuxi Wugo)
—	MF	CHN	Qi Long (loan return from Wuxi Wugo)
—	GK	CHN	Xue Qinghao (loan return from Nantong Zhiyun)

Out:

No.	Pos.	Nation	Player
2	DF	USA	Macario Hing-Glover (free agent)
8	FW	CHN	Liu Ruofan (to Wuhan Three Towns)
14	DF	CHN	Wang Hao (on loan to Shenzhen Peng City)
17	FW	CMR	Christian Bassogog (to (Turkey) Ankaragücü)
18	FW	CHN	Zhang Wei (on loan to Qingdao Hainiu)
24	DF	CHN	Xu Yougang (on loan to Guangxi Pingguo Haliao)
25	MF	CHN	Peng Xinli (to Shandong Taishan)
35	MF	CHN	He Longhai (on loan to Qingdao West Coast)
—	DF	CHN	Jiang Zhixin (on loan to Wuxi Wugo)
—	GK	CHN	Xue Qinghao (on loan to Nantong Zhiyun)
—	MF	CHN	Zhu Qiwen (on loan to Nanjing City)

=== Shenzhen Peng City ===
In:

No.	Pos.	Nation	Player
2	DF	CHN	Zhang Wei (from Shanghai Port)
3	MF	CHN	Tian Yinong (from Tianjin Jinmen Tiger)
6	MF	CHN	Lin Chuangyi (from Cangzhou Mighty Lions)
7	FW	BRA	Thiago Andrade (on loan from (United States) New York City)
9	FW	SWE	Samuel Armenteros (from (Saudi Arabia) Al-Kholood)
13	GK	CHN	Peng Peng (from Henan)
17	FW	CHN	Tao Yuan (from Qingdao Red Lions)
19	FW	HKG	Matt Orr (from Guangxi Pingguo Haliao)
20	DF	SRB	Rade Dugalić (from Meizhou Hakka)
24	DF	CHN	Wang Hao (on loan from Shanghai Shenhua)
26	DF	CHN	Deng Biao (from Nanjing City)
27	FW	CHN	Behram Abduweli (from Shandong Taishan)
29	MF	CHN	Wang Chu (from Chengdu Rongcheng)
30	GK	CHN	Zhang Yuquan (from Suzhou Dongwu)
44	FW	CHN	Ruan Yang (from Nantong Zhiyun)
—	FW	CHN	Liu Xinyu (loan return from Liaoning Tieren)

Out:

No.	Pos.	Nation	Player
6	MF	CHN	Chen Yi (to Heilongjiang Ice City)
22	MF	CHN	Jin Shang (on loan to Suzhou Dongwu)
25	DF	CHN	Omer Abdukerim (on loan to Shijiazhuang Gongfu)
26	FW	NGA	Chisom Egbuchulam (to (United Arab Emirates) Hatta)
27	FW	CHN	Behram Abduweli (loan return to Shandong Taishan)
29	FW	CHN	Zhao Ziye (to Guangxi Pingguo Haliao)
30	GK	CHN	Zhang Yuquan (loan return to Suzhou Dongwu)
32	DF	CHN	Song Chen (to Liaoning Tieren)
39	DF	CHN	Li Bowen (on loan to Foshan Nanshi)

=== Tianjin Jinmen Tiger ===
In:

No.	Pos.	Nation	Player
2	DF	AUS	Alex Grant (from (South Korea) Pohang Steelers)
4	DF	CHN	Wang Xianjun (from Dalian Pro)
7	MF	ALB	Albion Ademi (from (Sweden) Värnamo)
9	FW	ITA	Andrea Compagno (from (Romania) FCSB)
10	MF	CRO	Ivan Fiolić (from (Croatia) Osijek)
14	DF	CHN	Huang Jiahui (from Dalian Pro)
19	FW	CHN	Liu Junxian (from Guangxi Pingguo Haliao)
21	DF	CRO	Mile Škorić (from Cangzhou Mighty Lions)
24	DF	CHN	Xiao Junlong (free transfer)
33	DF	CHN	Ding Haifeng (from Shijiazhuang Gongfu)

Out:

No.	Pos.	Nation	Player
2	DF	ESP	David Andújar (to (Spain) Ponferradina)
4	DF	CHN	Yang Fan (loan return to Beijing Guoan)
8	FW	CHN	Leng Jixuan (free agent)
8	MF	CHN	Zhao Yingjie (to Cangzhou Mighty Lions)
9	FW	SVN	Robert Berić (to Changchun Yatai)
10	FW	BRA	Farley Rosa (to (South Korea) Daejeon Hana Citizen)
19	FW	CHN	Chang Feiya (to Shanghai Jiading Huilong)
20	DF	CHN	Wang Jianan (to Meizhou Hakka)
24	MF	CHN	Piao Taoyu (to Qingdao West Coast)
26	GK	CHN	Xu Jiamin (to Henan)
31	MF	CHN	Tian Yinong (to Shenzhen Peng City)
34	MF	BUL	Petar Vitanov (to (Belgium) Beveren)
38	MF	ESP	Fran Mérida (to (Spain) Lugo)

=== Wuhan Three Towns ===
In:

No.	Pos.	Nation	Player
1	GK	CHN	Wei Minzhe (from Shenzhen)
2	DF	COL	Danilo Arboleda (from (Qatar) Al Ahli)
6	MF	CHN	Ablahan Haliq (on loan from Shanghai Port)
8	FW	CHN	Liu Ruofan (from Shanghai Shenhua)
9	FW	BRA	Pedro Henrique (from (Poland) Radomiak Radom)
11	FW	GNB	Romário Baldé (from Nantong Zhiyun)
13	MF	CHN	Gao Yunan (from Qingdao West Coast)
15	DF	CHN	Shewketjan Tayir (loan return from Haikou Mingcheng)
16	MF	CHN	Zhang Hui (loan return from Haikou Mingcheng)
19	MF	CHN	Liu Yue (from Shenzhen)
20	FW	CHN	Afrden Asqer (on loan from Guangzhou)
33	MF	CHN	He Tongshuai (loan return from Haikou Mingcheng)
36	DF	CHN	Lin Wenjie (loan return from Haikou Mingcheng)
37	MF	BRA	Darlan (from (Bulgaria) Levski Sofia)
38	GK	CHN	Chen Xing (from Haikou Mingcheng)
40	DF	CHN	Umidjan Yusup (loan return from Haikou Mingcheng)
43	DF	CHN	Zhang Tao (loan return from Haikou Mingcheng)
—	DF	CHN	Yang Minjie (loan return from Henan)

Out:

No.	Pos.	Nation	Player
1	GK	CHN	Wu Fei (free agent)
2	DF	CHN	Li Yang (to Chengdu Rongcheng)
3	DF	BRA	Wallace (to (United Arab Emirates) Ittihad Kalba)
4	FW	CHN	Wei Shihao (to Chengdu Rongcheng)
8	MF	CHN	Yan Dinghao (to Chengdu Rongcheng)
9	FW	GHA	Abdul-Aziz Yakubu (loan return to (Portugal) Rio Ave)
11	FW	BRA	Davidson (to (Turkey) İstanbul Başakşehir)
13	FW	BRA	Marcão (loan return to (Saudi Arabia) Al-Ahli)
14	MF	CHN	Luo Jing (to Yunnan Yukun)
16	DF	CHN	Yang Kuo (to Henan)
19	DF	CHN	Zhang Wentao (to Guangxi Pingguo Haliao)
20	DF	CHN	Gao Zhunyi (to Shandong Taishan)
24	MF	CHN	Duan Liuyu (loan return to Shandong Taishan)
26	DF	CHN	He Guan (loan return to Shanghai Port)
30	MF	CHN	Xie Pengfei (to Shanghai Shenhua)
32	DF	CHN	Lü Haidong (free agent)
—	DF	CHN	Yang Minjie (on loan to Guangxi Pingguo Haliao)

=== Zhejiang ===
In:

No.	Pos.	Nation	Player
1	GK	CHN	Dong Chunyu (from Shenzhen)
7	FW	NED	Deabeas Owusu-Sekyere (from Cangzhou Mighty Lions)
14	MF	CHN	Wu Wei (from Dalian Pro)
26	DF	CHN	Sun Guowen (on loan from Shandong Taishan)
45	FW	BRA	Léo Souza (on loan from Shandong Taishan)
—	MF	CHN	Bao Shengxin (loan return from Shanghai Jiading Huilong)
—	FW	CMR	Donovan Ewolo (loan return from Guangxi Pingguo Haliao)
—	FW	CHN	Gao Tianyu (loan return from Henan)
—	FW	CHN	Eysajan Kurban (loan return from Heilongjiang Ice City)

Out:

No.	Pos.	Nation	Player
7	FW	CMR	Donovan Ewolo (to (Saudi Arabia) Al-Adalah)
12	GK	CHN	Lai Jinfeng (to Shanghai Jiading Huilong)
16	MF	CHN	Bao Shengxin (on loan to Shanghai Jiading Huilong)
21	FW	CHN	Ji Shengpan (on loan to Nantong Zhiyun)
30	FW	ZIM	Nyasha Mushekwi (to Yunnan Yukunn)
45	FW	BRA	Léo Souza (loan return to Shandong Taishan)
—	FW	CHN	Gao Tianyu (on loan to Qingdao West Coast)
—	FW	CHN	Eysajan Kurban (to Guangzhou)
—	MF	CHN	Li Yan (to Shanghai Jiading Huilong)

== League One ==
Note: Flags indicate national team as has been defined under FIFA eligibility rules. Players may hold more than one non-FIFA nationality.

=== Chongqing Tonglianglong ===
In:

No.	Pos.	Nation	Player
1	GK	CHN	Sun Qihang (on loan from Shandong Taishan)
2	DF	CHN	Mustapa Tash (on loan from Shandong Taishan)
3	DF	CHN	Luo Andong (from Liaoning Tieren)
4	DF	TPE	Yaki Yen (from Nanjing City)
9	FW	ARG	Juan Lescano (from (Finland) Haka)
10	FW	CMR	Serge Tabekou (from (Saudi Arabia) Al-Bukiryah)
20	DF	CHN	Hu Jing (from Chengdu Rongcheng)
22	DF	SRB	Aleksandar Andrejević (from Qingdao Hainiu)
25	GK	CHN	Kudirat Ablet (from Dalian Pro)
28	FW	CHN	Sun Xipeng (from Qingdao Hainiu)

Out:

No.	Pos.	Nation	Player
1	GK	CHN	Liu Weiguo (to Liaoning Tieren)
2	DF	CHN	Yang Ting (loan return to Chengdu Rongcheng)
3	DF	CHN	Hu Yongfa (free agent)
4	DF	CHN	Li Shisen (to Langfang Glory City)
6	MF	CHN	Zhou Yunyi (loan return to Chengdu Rongcheng)
8	MF	CHN	Dilxat Ablimit (to Suzhou Dongwu)
17	FW	CHN	Chen Jiaqi (loan return to Qingdao Hainiu)
21	MF	CHN	Yang Yixuan (free agent)
28	DF	CHN	Chen Hongzhen (free agent)
29	DF	CHN	Yu Yang (free agent)
37	GK	CHN	Mewlan Jappar (loan return to Jiangxi Dark Horse Junior)
58	DF	CHN	Quan Jiahao (free agent)

=== Dalian Young Boy ===
In:

No.	Pos.	Nation	Player
5	DF	CHN	Jin Pengxiang (free transfer)
6	DF	BRA	Róbson (from (Saudi Arabia) Al Jandal)
7	FW	GNB	José Embaló (from (Lebanon) Nejmeh)
8	MF	CHN	Qu Geping (from Dalian Pro)
11	MF	CHN	Wang Tengda (from Dalian Pro)
15	DF	CHN	Fu Yuncheng (from Qingdao Hainiu)
16	FW	CHN	Zhu Pengyu (from Dalian FA)
17	GK	CHN	Sui Weijie (from Shijiazhuang Gongfu)
18	DF	CHN	He Xiaoqiang (on loan from Beijing Guoan)
20	DF	CHN	Wang Shixin (from Guangxi Pingguo Haliao)
21	MF	CHN	Lü Peng (from Dalian Pro)
23	MF	CHN	Huang Shan (from Dalian Pro)
25	GK	CHN	Xiao Zhiren (from Dalian Pro)
28	MF	CHN	Fei Yu (from Dalian Pro)
31	DF	CHN	Wu Xinze (from Dalian FA)
38	FW	CHN	Lü Zhuoyi (from Dalian Pro)
39	FW	CHN	Yan Xiangchuang (from Dalian Pro)
44	MF	SVN	Andrej Kotnik (on loan from Meizhou Hakka)

Out:

No.	Pos.	Nation	Player
5	DF	CHN	Ji Zhengyu (free agent)
8	MF	CHN	Hu Yanqiang (free agent)
11	MF	CHN	Ge Yuxiang (free agent)
13	GK	CHN	Liu Yipeng (free agent)
15	MF	CHN	Jin Qiang (free agent)
18	MF	CHN	Liu Yang (free agent)
23	MF	CHN	Yin Lu (free agent)
25	MF	CHN	Cong Zhen (free agent)
27	MF	CHN	Li Jiahe (free agent)
48	DF	CHN	Wang Zixuan (free agent)
49	MF	CHN	Li Yehui (free agent)
51	DF	CHN	Hu Binrong (free agent)

=== Foshan Nanshi ===
In:

No.	Pos.	Nation	Player
1	GK	CHN	Gao Yuqin (from Quanzhou Yassin)
3	DF	CHN	Zhang Xiangshuo (from Cangzhou Mighty Lions)
5	MF	CHN	Che Shiwei (from Yunnan Yukun)
7	FW	CHN	Li Jiaheng (on loan from Guangzhou)
8	MF	CHN	Huang Yushen (on loan from Changchun Yatai)
9	FW	CAF	Alfred Gombe-Fei (from (United Arab Emirates) Elite Falcons)
10	MF	PAN	Rafael Águila (from (Panama) Independiente de La Chorrera)
16	MF	CHN	Ma Junliang (from Nanjing City)
17	DF	SRB	Mario Maslać (free transfer)
20	MF	CHN	Wu Yizhen (from Shanghai Jiading Huilong)
22	MF	CHN	Ye Zimin (from (Spain) Unió Esportiva Ripollés)
23	DF	CHN	Wen Junjie (from Meizhou Hakka)
24	FW	CHN	Song Runtong (on loan from Henan)
39	DF	CHN	Li Bowen (on loan from Shenzhen Peng City)
—	DF	CHN	Huang Yuxuan (loan return from Wuxi Wugo)

Out:

No.	Pos.	Nation	Player
2	DF	CHN	Zhang Sijie (loan return to Meizhou Hakka)
4	DF	CHN	Huang Yuxuan (to Wuxi Wugo)
8	MF	CHN	Ruan Jun (to Yunnan Yukun)
10	FW	NGA	Kingsley Onuegbu (to Nanjing City)
26	DF	CHN	Su Shihao (to Shanghai Jiading Huilong)
32	MF	CHN	Ma Junliang (loan return to Nanjing City)
35	DF	CHN	He Mingli (on loan to Wuxi Wugo)

=== Guangxi Pingguo Haliao ===
In:

No.	Pos.	Nation	Player
3	MF	CHN	Yi Xianlong (on loan from Shandong Taishan)
4	DF	HKG	Vas Nuñez (from Dalian Pro)
5	DF	CHN	Hu Mingfei (from Suzhou Dongwu)
6	DF	CHN	Zhang Wentao (from Wuhan Three Towns)
7	MF	NED	Hector Hevel (from (Spain) Cartagena)
8	MF	CHN	Hu Jiajin (from Shenzhen)
10	FW	MAR	Yacine Bammou (from (France) Ajaccio)
15	DF	CHN	Yang Minjie (on loan from Wuhan Three Towns)
16	DF	CHN	Xu Yougang (on loan from Shanghai Shenhua)
19	FW	CHN	Wang Jingbin (from Yunnan Yukun)
23	DF	CHN	Bai Jiajun (from Jinan Xingzhou)
25	DF	CHN	Liu Yang (from Cangzhou Mighty Lions)
27	MF	CHN	Zhang Huajun (from Nanjing City)
30	MF	CHN	Li Jiaqi (from Changchun Yatai)
33	MF	CHN	Ye Chongqiu (from Jinan Xingzhou)
37	FW	BRA	Giovanny (from (Bulgaria) Lokomotiv Plovdiv)
44	FW	CHN	Fan Chao (on loan from Changchun Yatai)
45	FW	CHN	Zhao Ziye (from Shenzhen Peng City)

Out:

No.	Pos.	Nation	Player
7	MF	CHN	Zhao Xuri (released)
11	FW	HKG	Matt Orr (to Shenzhen Peng City)
20	DF	CHN	Wang Shixin (to Dalian Young Boy)
23	DF	CHN	Jin Pengxiang (released)
25	DF	CHN	Zou Zheng (retired)
26	FW	CHN	Li Rui (to Shaanxi Union)
30	FW	CHN	Liu Junxian (to Tianjin Jinmen Tiger)
37	MF	CHN	Song Zhiwei (released)
43	FW	CMR	Donovan Ewolo (loan return to Zhejiang)

=== Guangzhou ===
In:

No.	Pos.	Nation	Player
—	FW	COL	Juan Alegría (from (Colombia) Jaguares de Córdoba)
—	FW	CHN	Eysajan Kurban (from Zhejiang)
—	FW	COL	Juan Peñaloza (from (Latvia) Valmiera)
—	DF	LTU	Rimvydas Sadauskas (from (Lithuania) Šiauliai)
—	FW	CHN	Li Jiaheng (loan return from Jiangxi Dark Horse Junior)

Out:

No.	Pos.	Nation	Player
3	DF	CHN	Zhao Wenzhe (free agent)
6	DF	CHN	Wei Minghe (free agent)
8	MF	CHN	Chen Guokang (loan return to Meizhou Hakka)
9	FW	CHN	Afrden Asqer (on loan to Wuhan Three Towns)
12	DF	CHN	Chen Rijin (free agent)
13	MF	CHN	Huang Guangliang (free agent)
16	FW	CHN	Fan Hengbo (free agent)
19	GK	CHN	Zhang Jianzhi (to Yunnan Yukun)
20	MF	CHN	Zheng Shengxiong (free agent)
28	FW	CHN	Ling Jie (to Nanjing City)
30	FW	CHN	Bughrahan Iskandar (to Chengdu Rongcheng)
45	MF	CHN	Tu Menghan (free agent)
—	FW	CHN	Chen Long (to Liaoning Tieren)
—	FW	CHN	Li Jiaheng (on loan to Foshan Nanshi)

=== Heilongjiang Ice City ===
In:

No.	Pos.	Nation	Player
1	GK	CHN	Lu Ning (on loan from Changchun Yatai)
6	MF	CHN	Zhu Jiaxuan (from Dalian Pro)
7	MF	CHN	Piao Taoyu (on loan from Qingdao West Coast)
9	FW	BRA	Allan Paulista (from (Brazil) Iporá)
11	FW	COL	Ítalo Montaño (from (Malta) Birkirkara)
13	GK	CHN	Li Shengmin (on loan from Hubei Istar)
15	DF	CHN	Subi Ablimit (from Jiangxi Lushan)
16	DF	CHN	Zhou Pinxi (from Jiangxi Dark Horse Junior)
17	FW	CHN	Yan Yu (on loan from Beijing Guoan)
19	DF	KOR	Xu Hui (from Shanghai Jiading Huilong)
20	MF	CHN	Zhang Jiansheng (from Dalian Pro)
21	MF	CHN	Chen Yi (from Shenzhen Peng City)
22	MF	CHN	Ma Yujun (on loan from Beijing Guoan)
23	MF	CHN	Li Xiaoting (from Dandong Tengyue)
24	GK	CHN	Yang Chen (from Zhuhai 2030)
31	DF	BRA	Daciel (from (Brazil) Taubaté)
33	MF	CHN	Zhang Zimin (from Nanjing City)
34	FW	CHN	Shahsat Hujahmat (from Shenzhen)
37	MF	CHN	Ilaldin Abdugheni (from Quanzhou Yassin)
44	MF	CHN	Wen Jialong (on loan from Hubei Istar)

Out:

No.	Pos.	Nation	Player
5	MF	CHN	Zhu Jiaxuan (loan return to Dalian Pro)
6	MF	CHN	Ahmat Tursunjan (loan return to Hubei Istar)
11	FW	BRA	Erikys (to (South Korea) Cheonan City)
15	DF	CHN	Zhang Yixuan (loan return to Hubei Istar)
16	MF	CHN	Hu Jiali (to Cangzhou Mighty Lions)
19	MF	CHN	Wen Jialong (loan return to Hubei Istar)
21	FW	CHN	Eysajan Kurban (loan return to Zhejiang)
23	GK	CHN	Yerjet Yerzat (to Qingdao West Coast)
24	MF	HKG	Clement Benhaddouche (to Suzhou Dongwu)
29	MF	CHN	Xu Jiajun (loan return to Qingdao Hainiu)
30	FW	CHN	Wang Tao (loan return to Qingdao Hainiu)
31	GK	CHN	Li Guanxi (loan return to Shandong Taishan)
33	MF	CHN	Zhang Zimin (loan return to Nanjing City)
39	FW	GEO	Elguja Lobjanidze (to (Uzbekistan) Qizilqum)
45	DF	CHN	Xu Wu (loan return to Nantong Zhiyun)

=== Jiangxi Lushan ===
In:

No.	Pos.	Nation	Player
—	FW	LES	Thabiso Brown (from Dandong Tengyue)
—	DF	CHN	Du Junpeng (on loan from Qingdao West Coast)
—	MF	CHN	Hu Jiaqi (from Beijing Guoan)
—	GK	CHN	Ma Kunyue (from Beijing Guoan)
—	MF	BRA	Willie (from (Brazil) Santa Cruz)
—	FW	CHN	Wu Linfeng (from Changchun Shenhua)

Out:

No.	Pos.	Nation	Player
7	FW	BRA	Magno Cruz (to Shanghai Jiading Huilong)
8	MF	CHN	Hu Shuming (to Nanjing City)
15	DF	CHN	Mustahan Mijit (to Xinjiang Silk Road Eagle)
18	DF	CHN	Subi Ablimit (to Heilongjiang Ice City)
21	DF	CHN	Liu Wenhao (to Wuxi Wugo)
29	FW	CHN	Lin Zefeng (to Shenzhen Juniors)
34	GK	CHN	Ma Kunyue (loan return to Beijing Guoan)
36	GK	CHN	Shi Xiaotian (to Qingdao West Coast)

=== Liaoning Tieren ===
In:

No.	Pos.	Nation	Player
1	GK	CHN	Li Xuebo (from Dalian Pro)
2	MF	CHN	Gui Zihan (from Dalian Pro)
5	DF	CHN	Lin Longchang (from Dalian Pro)
6	MF	CHN	Duan Yunzi (from Nanjing City)
7	MF	CHN	Shang Yin (from Dalian Pro)
8	FW	NGA	Geoffrey Chinedu (from (Serbia) Radnički Kragujevac)
17	MF	CHN	Hui Jiakang (free transfer)
18	FW	CHN	Chen Long (from Guangzhou)
19	MF	CHN	Gao Haisheng (from Dandong Tengyue)
20	GK	CHN	Liu Weiguo (from Chongqing Tonglianglong)
21	MF	CHN	Zhan Sainan (from Shijiazhuang Gongfu)
22	MF	JPN	Takahiro Kunimoto (from (Malaysia) Johor Darul Ta'zim)
23	DF	CHN	Liu Shiming (from Dalian Pro)
36	MF	CHN	Tian De'ao (from Changchun Yatai)
38	DF	CHN	Song Chen (from Shenzhen Peng City)
39	MF	CHN	Yang Yu (from Yingkou Chaoyue)

Out:

No.	Pos.	Nation	Player
1	GK	CHN	Dong Jianhong (free agent)
4	MF	CHN	Kang Leqiang (free agent)
5	DF	CHN	Zhang Mingxuan (free agent)
6	MF	TPE	Wu Yen-shu (free agent)
7	FW	CHN	Liu Ziming (to Qingdao West Coast)
12	GK	CHN	Gao Tian (free agent)
18	MF	COL	Boris Palacios (free agent)
19	DF	CHN	Luo Andong (to Chongqing Tonglianglong)
20	MF	CHN	Ezimet Ekrem (free agent)
25	DF	CHN	Yu Shang (free agent)
29	FW	NGA	Michael Omoh (free agent)
33	MF	CHN	Li Shuai (free agent)
39	GK	CHN	Li Xuebo (loan return to Dalian Pro)
45	FW	CHN	Liu Xinyu (loan return to Shenzhen Peng City)

=== Nanjing City ===
In:

No.	Pos.	Nation	Player
—	DF	HKG	Alexandre Dujardin (from (Hong Kong) HK U23)
—	DF	CHN	Gong Hankui (from Chengdu Rongcheng)
—	MF	CHN	Hu Shuming (from Jiangxi Lushan)
—	DF	CHN	Huang Wei (from Shijiazhuang Gongfu)
—	FW	CHN	Ling Jie (from Guangzhou)
—	DF	CHN	Liu Jiahui (on loan from Henan)
—	FW	BRA	Moresche (from (Iraq) Naft Al-Basra)
—	FW	CHN	Nan Xiaoheng (from Shijiazhuang Gongfu)
—	FW	NGA	Moses Ogbu (from Shijiazhuang Gongfu)
—	FW	NGA	Kingsley Onuegbu (from Foshan Nanshi)
—	DF	CHN	Shi Lishan (on loan from Changchun Yatai)
—	MF	CHN	Wang Hao (from Changchun Shenhua)
—	MF	CHN	Wang Haoran (on loan from Henan)
—	MF	CHN	Wei Yuren (from Guangzhou E-Power)
—	DF	CHN	Zhang Yu (from Nantong Zhiyun)
—	MF	CHN	Zhu Qiwen (on loan from Shanghai Shenhua)
—	FW	BRA	Jefferson (loan return from Shanghai Jiading Huilong)
—	MF	CHN	Ma Junliang (loan return from Foshan Nanshi)
—	FW	CHN	Wei Chaolun (loan return from Qingdao Red Lions)
—	MF	CHN	Xie Zhiwei (loan return from Shanghai Jiading Huilong)
—	MF	CHN	Zhang Zimin (loan return from Heilongjiang Ice City)

Out:

No.	Pos.	Nation	Player
3	DF	TPE	Yaki Yen (to Chongqing Tonglianglong)
5	DF	CHN	Deng Biao (to Shenzhen Peng City)
6	MF	CHN	Duan Yunzi (to Liaoning Tieren)
10	FW	BRA	Jefferson (to (Bolivia) Jorge Wilstermann)
11	MF	CHN	Zhang Huajun (to Guangxi Pingguo Haliao)
16	DF	CHN	Han Xuan (loan return to Chengdu Rongcheng)
17	DF	CHN	Sun Guoliang (to Changchun Yatai)
18	FW	CHN	Wei Chaolun (to Langfang Glory City)
22	MF	CHN	Xie Zhiwei (to Shaanxi Union)
25	GK	CHN	Xing Yu (loan return to Chengdu Rongcheng)
26	MF	CHN	Ma Junliang (to Foshan Nanshi)
28	FW	CMR	Messi Bouli (to Shijiazhuang Gongfu)
30	DF	CHN	Ababekri Erkin (to Shanghai Jiading Huilong)
40	FW	KEN	Ayub Masika (to (Azerbaijan) Sabail)
42	MF	CHN	Ma Yujun (loan return to Beijing Guoan)
—	MF	CHN	Zhang Zimin (to Heilongjiang Ice City)

=== Qingdao Red Lions ===
In:

No.	Pos.	Nation	Player
9	FW	FRA	Yaya Sanogo (from (Armenia) Urartu)

Out:

No.	Pos.	Nation	Player
9	FW	CHN	Gong Zheng (to Xi'an Chongde Ronghai)
11	FW	CHN	Sun Xipeng (loan return to Qingdao Hainiu)
13	DF	CHN	Chen Fuhai (loan return to Qingdao West Coast)
14	FW	CHN	Wen Da (to Cangzhou Mighty Lions)
20	FW	CHN	Tao Yuan (to Shenzhen Peng City)
25	FW	CHN	Wei Chaolun (loan return to Nanjing City)
26	DF	CHN	Sun Xu (loan return to Qingdao Hainiu)
28	MF	CHN	Gao Yixuan (loan return to Qingdao Hainiu)
33	DF	CHN	Han Xuan (loan return to Qingdao West Coast)
37	MF	CHN	Li Guihao (loan return to Qingdao West Coast)

=== Shanghai Jiading Huilong ===
In:

No.	Pos.	Nation	Player
—	MF	CHN	Bao Shengxin (on loan from Zhejiang)
—	FW	BRA	Magno Cruz (from Jiangxi Lushan)
—	FW	CHN	Chang Feiya (from Tianjin Jinmen Tiger)
—	DF	CHN	Ababekri Erkin (from Nanjing City)
—	FW	GHA	Evans Etti (on loan from (Ghana) Accra Lions)
—	DF	CHN	Gong Chunjie (from Tai'an Tiankuang)
—	GK	CHN	Lai Jinfeng (from Zhejiang)
—	MF	CHN	Li Guihao (from Qingdao West Coast)
—	MF	CHN	Li Yan (from Zhejiang)
—	DF	CHN	Liu Boyang (from Jinan Xingzhou)
—	MF	CHN	Sherzat Nur (on loan from Hubei Istar)
—	DF	CHN	Qiu Tianyi (from Dandong Tengyue)
—	FW	CHN	Shi Jian (on loan from Qingdao West Coast)
—	DF	CHN	Su Shihao (from Foshan Nanshi)
—	FW	BRA	Dominic Vinicius (from (United Arab Emirates) Al Dhaid)
—	MF	CHN	Yan Yiming (from Zibo Qisheng)
—	DF	CHN	Yao Ben (from Suzhou Dongwu)
—	MF	CHN	Yu Longyun (on loan from Hubei Istar)
—	DF	CHN	Zhang Ran (free transfer)

Out:

No.	Pos.	Nation	Player
4	MF	CHN	Bao Shengxin (loan return to Zhejiang)
10	FW	GHA	Evans Etti (loan return to (Ghana) Accra Lions)
17	DF	GHA	Jacob Mensah (loan return to (Ghana) Accra Lions)
21	MF	CHN	Wu Yizhen (to Foshan Nanshi)
22	MF	CHN	Zhang Jiansheng (loan return to Dalian Pro)
23	FW	CHN	Wu Yufan (to Langfang Glory City)
29	FW	BRA	Jefferson (loan return to Nanjing City)
33	DF	KOR	Xu Hui (to Heilongjiang Ice City)
40	MF	CHN	Xie Zhiwei (loan return to Nanjing City)
—	GK	CHN	Wang Xiaofan (to Guizhou Zhucheng Athletic)

=== Shijiazhuang Gongfu ===
In:

No.	Pos.	Nation	Player
5	MF	CHN	Song Zhiwei (free transfer)
6	DF	CHN	Zhang Junzhe (from Changchun Shenhua)
7	FW	SRB	Mladen Kovačević (from Dandong Tengyue)
9	FW	CHN	Gui Hong (from Nantong Zhiyun)
14	DF	CHN	Ma Chongchong (from Jinan Xingzhou)
15	MF	CHN	Xu Yue (from Shenzhen)
18	MF	CHN	Ma Shuai (from Tai'an Tiankuang)
19	DF	CHN	Liu Huan (from Nantong Zhiyun)
20	DF	CHN	Liu Le (from Dalian Pro)
24	MF	CHN	Chen Zhexuan (on loan from Shandong Taishan)
25	DF	CHN	Omer Abdukerim (on loan from Shenzhen Peng City)
28	FW	CMR	Messi Bouli (from Nanjing City)
31	GK	CHN	Li Guanxi (on loan from Shandong Taishan)
32	FW	CHN	Nan Yunqi (from Shaanxi Union)
33	MF	CHN	Wang Song (from Nantong Zhiyun)

Out:

No.	Pos.	Nation	Player
3	DF	CHN	Song Haoyu (loan return to Nantong Zhiyun)
9	FW	CHN	Nan Xiaoheng (to Nanjing City)
17	GK	CHN	Sui Weijie (to Dalian Young Boy)
20	FW	NGA	Moses Ogbu (to Nanjing City)
22	DF	BRA	Venício ( (South Korea) Chungbuk Cheongju)
32	DF	CHN	Ding Haifeng (to Tianjin Jinmen Tiger)
34	DF	CHN	Song Bowei (loan return to Shandong Taishan)
35	MF	CHN	Zhan Sainan (to Liaoning Tieren)
39	MF	CHN	Kamiran Halimurat (loan return to Nantong Zhiyun)
45	DF	CHN	Huang Wei (to Nanjing City)

=== Suzhou Dongwu ===
In:

No.	Pos.	Nation	Player
—	MF	CHN	Dilxat Ablimit (from Chongqing Tonglianglong)
—	MF	HKG	Clement Benhaddouche (from Heilongjiang Ice City)
—	MF	CHN	Deng Yubiao (from Guangzhou E-Power)
—	MF	CHN	Duan Dezhi (on loan from Beijing Guoan)
—	GK	CHN	Guo Tong (from Nantong Zhiyun)
—	MF	CHN	Jin Shang (on loan from Shenzhen Peng City)
—	FW	BRA	Leonardo (from (Japan) Fujieda MYFC)
—	FW	BRA	João Leonardo (from (Brazil) Audax)
—	GK	CHN	Liu Yu (from Xi'an Chongde Ronghai)
—	DF	CHN	Shang Kefeng (from Jiangsu Landhouse Dong Victory)
—	DF	CHN	Xiang Rongjun (on loan from Shanghai Port)
—	DF	CHN	Xu Wu (from Nantong Zhiyun)
—	MF	CHN	Anfal Yaremati (from Yunnan Yukun)
—	DF	KOR	Yeon Jei-min (from (South Korea) Anyang)
—	GK	CHN	Zhang Yuquan (loan return from Shenzhen Peng City)

Out:

No.	Pos.	Nation	Player
3	DF	CHN	Yao Ben (to Shanghai Jiading Huilong)
4	DF	CHN	Gu Weikang (free agent)
5	DF	CHN	Hu Mingfei (to Guangxi Pingguo Haliao)
7	MF	CHN	Wu Lei (to Chengdu Rongcheng)
8	MF	CHN	Yu Longyun (loan return to Hubei Istar)
13	MF	CHN	Liu Hengbo (free agent)
16	FW	CHN	Chen Yunhan (free agent)
19	FW	CHN	Abdulla Adil (loan return to Changchun Yatai)
20	FW	CHN	Men Yang (to Shenzhen Juniors)
23	GK	CHN	Zhang Jingyi (to Wuxi Wugo)
25	GK	CHN	Guo Jiawei (free agent)
27	DF	CHN	Liu Hao (free agent)
30	MF	CHN	Yuan Zheng (on loan to Wuxi Wugo)
42	MF	CHN	Shi Yucheng (loan return to Beijing Guoan)
44	MF	POR	Pedro Delgado (loan return to Shandong Taishan)
—	DF	CHN	Hamit Shepket (to Jiangsu Landhouse Dong Victory)
—	GK	CHN	Zhang Yuquan (to Shenzhen Peng City)

=== Wuxi Wugo ===
In:

No.	Pos.	Nation	Player
5	DF	CHN	Lin Jiahao (on loan from Jinan Xingzhou)
8	MF	CHN	Zhang Yuanshu (from Jinan Xingzhou)
9	FW	SRB	Nikola Dišić (from (Kazakhstan) Kaisar)
11	FW	MNE	Staniša Mandić (from (Bosnia and Herzegovina) GOŠK Gabela)
12	MF	CHN	Song Xintao (from Zibo Qisheng)
14	MF	CHN	Rehmitulla Shohret (from Jinan Xingzhou)
15	MF	CHN	Ahmat Tursunjan (from Hubei Istar)
16	DF	CHN	Liu Wenhao (from Jiangxi Lushan)
19	FW	CHN	Li Boxi (on loan from Beijing Guoan)
21	DF	CHN	He Mingli (on loan from Foshan Nanshi)
22	GK	CHN	Zhang Jingyi (from Suzhou Dongwu)
24	DF	CHN	Huang Yuxuan (from Foshan Nanshi)
25	DF	CHN	Lin Feiyang (on loan from Hubei Istar)
29	DF	CHN	Jiang Zhixin (on loan from Shanghai Shenhua)
30	MF	CHN	Yuan Zheng (on loan from Suzhou Dongwu)
31	GK	CHN	Xiao Baiyang (from Zibo Qisheng)
32	DF	CHN	Gao Hanfei (from Jinan Xingzhou)
33	MF	SRB	Dimitrije Pobulić (from (Armenia) Shirak)
39	MF	CHN	Fu Hao (from Shenzhen)

Out:

No.	Pos.	Nation	Player
1	GK	CHN	Rong Shang (free agent)
2	MF	CHN	Zhang Yuanshu (loan return to Jinan Xingzhou)
11	FW	CHN	Zhou Yuye (free agent)
12	FW	SRB	Bogdan Mladenović (free agent)
15	FW	CHN	Li Boxi (loan return to Beijing Guoan)
16	DF	CHN	Peng Rui (free agent)
19	FW	CHN	Li Wenyong (free agent)
20	MF	CHN	Yang Fan (free agent)
23	MF	CHN	Zhu Zhengyu (free agent)
24	DF	CHN	Huang Yuxuan (loan return to Foshan Nanshi)
26	MF	CHN	Pi Ziyang (free agent)
28	DF	CHN	Li Shizhou (to Jiangsu Landhouse Dong Victory)
29	DF	CHN	Jiang Zhixin (loan return to Shanghai Shenhua)
30	MF	CHN	Sun Rui (free agent)
35	DF	CHN	Ye Daochi (loan return to Nantong Zhiyun)
36	MF	CHN	Qi Long (loan return to Shanghai Shenhua)
37	FW	SRB	Miloš Gordić (free agent)
38	MF	CHN	Sun Enming (loan return to Shanghai Port)
39	DF	CHN	Liu Zhanyu (free agent)
42	DF	CHN	Cao Xiaoyi (free agent)
44	DF	CHN	Lin Jiahao (loan return to Jinan Xingzhou)
45	GK	CHN	Wen Hui (free agent)

=== Yanbian Longding ===
In:

No.	Pos.	Nation	Player
7	MF	CHN	Han Guanghui (from Chengdu Rongcheng)
9	FW	BRA	Ronan (from (South Korea) Seoul E-Land)
11	FW	COL	Victor Arboleda (from (Saudi Arabia) Al Safa)
12	GK	CHN	Li Yanan (from Yunnan Yukun)
15	DF	CHN	Xu Jizu (from Jinan Xingzhou)
24	MF	CHN	Li Haojie (free transfer)
36	MF	CHN	Yang Erhai (from Changchun Yatai)
39	DF	CHN	Hu Ziqian (from Quanzhou Yassin)

Out:

No.	Pos.	Nation	Player
7	MF	CHN	Han Guanghui (loan return to Chengdu Rongcheng)
16	DF	CHN	Gong Hankui (loan return to Chengdu Rongcheng)

=== Yunnan Yukun ===
In:

No.	Pos.	Nation	Player
—	MF	CHN	Chen Chenzhenyang (from Dalian Pro)
—	MF	CHN	Cui Ming'an (from Dalian Pro)
—	MF	ROU	Alexandru Ioniță (from (Romania) Rapid București)
—	MF	MAR	Zakaria Labyad (from (Netherlands) Utrecht)
—	DF	CHN	Li Peng (from Cangzhou Mighty Lions)
—	MF	CHN	Luo Jing (from Wuhan Three Towns)
—	DF	CHN	Dilmurat Mawlanyaz (from Henan)
—	MF	CHN	Miao Lin (loan return from Ganzhou Ruishi)
—	FW	ZIM	Nyasha Mushekwi (from Zhejiang)
—	MF	CHN	Ruan Jun (from Foshan Nanshi)
—	GK	CHN	Yao Haoyang (on loan from Hubei Istar)
—	DF	CHN	Yi Teng (from Changchun Yatai)
—	GK	CHN	Zhang Jianzhi (from Guangzhou)
—	DF	CHN	Zhao Jianan (from Dalian Pro)
—	FW	CHN	Zhao Jianbo (from Dalian Pro)
—	DF	CHN	Zhao Yuhao (from Henan)

Out:

No.	Pos.	Nation	Player
1	GK	CHN	Li Yanan (to Yanbian Longding)
2	DF	CHN	Luo Heng (free agent)
4	DF	CHN	Yang Jianfei (free agent)
7	MF	CHN	Lu Yao (free agent)
9	FW	CHN	Du Changjie (to Xi'an Chongde Ronghai)
11	DF	CHN	Wang Junming (free agent)
12	MF	CHN	Ma Chao (free agent)
13	FW	CHN	Li Ming (free agent)
17	MF	CHN	Che Shiwei (to Foshan Nanshi)
18	FW	CHN	Wang Xiao (free agent)
19	MF	CHN	Li Xiaoming (free agent)
20	FW	CHN	Wang Jingbin (to Guangxi Pingguo Haliao)
25	MF	CHN	Zhang Jie (free agent)
26	DF	CHN	Liu Jing (free agent)
28	MF	CHN	He Xin (free agent)
29	DF	CHN	Liu Wenqing (free agent)
42	MF	CHN	Anfal Yaremati (to Suzhou Dongwu)
47	DF	CHN	Liao Jiajun (free agent)
53	MF	CHN	Molen Kerim (free agent)
55	DF	CHN	Li Wenhao (free agent)
59	DF	CHN	Wang Shihao (free agent)
—	MF	CHN	Miao Lin (free agent)

== Pulled out ==
Note: Flags indicate national team as has been defined under FIFA eligibility rules. Players may hold more than one non-FIFA nationality.

=== Dalian Pro ===
In:

No.	Pos.	Nation	Player
—	MF	CHN	Gui Zihan (loan return from Qingdao West Coast)
—	GK	CHN	Li Xuebo (loan return from Liaoning Tieren)
—	MF	CHN	Zhang Jiansheng (loan return from Shanghai Jiading Huilong)
—	MF	CHN	Zhu Jiaxuan (loan return from Heilongjiang Ice City)

Out:

No.	Pos.	Nation	Player
2	DF	CHN	Lin Longchang (to Liaoning Tieren)
3	DF	CHN	Zhao Jianan (to Yunnan Yukun)
4	DF	HKG	Vas Nuñez (to Guangxi Pingguo Haliao)
5	MF	CHN	Wu Wei (to Zhejiang)
6	DF	CHN	Wang Xianjun (to Tianjin Jinmen Tiger)
7	MF	CHN	Lin Liangming (to Beijing Guoan)
8	DF	CHN	Zhu Ting (retired)
10	MF	BUL	Borislav Tsonev (to (Bulgaria) Arda Kardzhali)
11	FW	GER	Streli Mamba (to (Turkey) Tuzlaspor)
13	DF	CHN	Wang Yaopeng (to Changchun Yatai)
14	DF	CHN	Huang Jiahui (to Tianjin Jinmen Tiger)
15	FW	CHN	Zhao Jianbo (to Yunnan Yukun)
16	DF	CHN	Liu Le (to Shijiazhuang Gongfu)
17	FW	CAF	Lobi Manzoki (to (United Arab Emirates) Hatta)
18	DF	CHN	He Yupeng (to Beijing Guoan)
19	DF	CHN	Wang Zhen'ao (to Shanghai Port)
20	MF	CHN	Wang Tengda (to Dalian Young Boy)
23	MF	CHN	Shang Yin (to Liaoning Tieren)
26	MF	CHN	Cui Ming'an (to Yunnan Yukun)
28	MF	CHN	Fei Yu (to Dalian Young Boy)
30	GK	CHN	Wu Yan (retired)
31	MF	CHN	Lü Peng (to Dalian Young Boy)
32	GK	CHN	Kudirat Ablet (to Chongqing Tonglianglong)
35	MF	CHN	Wang Yu (to Changchun Yatai)
36	GK	CHN	Wang Jinshuai (to Henan)
38	FW	CHN	Lü Zhuoyi (to Dalian Young Boy)
39	FW	CHN	Yan Xiangchuang (to Dalian Young Boy)
—	MF	CHN	Chen Chenzhenyang (to Yunnan Yukun)
—	DF	CHN	Elkut Eysajan (to Shaanxi Union)
—	MF	CHN	Gui Zihan (to Liaoning Tieren)
—	MF	CHN	Huang Shan (to Dalian Young Boy)
—	GK	CHN	Li Xuebo (to Liaoning Tieren)
—	DF	CHN	Liu Shiming (to Liaoning Tieren)
—	MF	CHN	Qu Geping (to Dalian Young Boy)
—	GK	CHN	Xiao Zhiren (to Dalian Young Boy)
—	MF	CHN	Zhang Jiansheng (to Heilongjiang Ice City)
—	MF	CHN	Zhu Jiaxuan (to Heilongjiang Ice City)

=== Dandong Tengyue ===
In:

No.	Pos.	Nation	Player

Out:

No.	Pos.	Nation	Player
1	GK	CHN	Kou Jiahao (to Guizhou Zhucheng Athletic)
4	DF	CHN	Yao Diran (to Shaanxi Union)
5	DF	CHN	Qiu Tianyi (to Shanghai Jiading Huilong)
8	MF	CHN	Gao Haisheng (to Liaoning Tieren)
9	FW	SRB	Mladen Kovačević (to Shijiazhuang Gongfu)
11	MF	CHN	Nuali Zimin (to Nantong Zhiyun)
18	MF	CHN	Li Xiaoting (to Heilongjiang Ice City)
19	MF	CHN	Tang Miao (to Jiangsu Landhouse Dong Victory)
24	MF	CHN	Sherzat Nur (loan return to Hubei Istar)
28	DF	HKG	Remi Dujardin (to Hong Kong Rangers)
37	FW	LES	Thabiso Brown (to Jiangxi Lushan)
38	MF	CHN	Hu Mingtian (loan return to Chengdu Rongcheng)

=== Jinan Xingzhou ===
In:

No.	Pos.	Nation	Player
—	DF	CHN	Lin Jiahao (loan return from Wuxi Wugo)
—	MF	CHN	Zhang Yuanshu (loan return from Wuxi Wugo)

Out:

No.	Pos.	Nation	Player
3	DF	CHN	Lin Jiahao (on loan to Wuxi Wugo)
4	DF	CHN	Liu Boyang (to Shanghai Jiading Huilong)
7	MF	CHN	Zhang Yuanshu (to Wuxi Wugo)
9	MF	CHN	Lu Yongtao (loan return to Shandong Taishan)
10	DF	CHN	Wang Zihao (to Qingdao Hainiu)
14	DF	ZAM	Stoppila Sunzu (to Cangzhou Mighty Lions)
17	DF	CHN	Xu Jizu (to Yanbian Longding)
18	FW	CMR	Robert Ndip Tambe (to (Kazakhstan) Yelimay)
19	DF	CHN	Ma Chongchong (to Shijiazhuang Gongfu)
20	MF	CHN	Rehmitulla Shohret (to Wuxi Wugo)
21	MF	CHN	Zhang Yi (loan return to Shanghai Port)
23	DF	CHN	Bai Jiajun (to Guangxi Pingguo Haliao)
27	FW	BRA	Fernando Karanga (to (Bulgaria) CSKA Sofia)
28	MF	CHN	Zhong Weihong (to Shaanxi Union)
32	DF	CHN	Gao Hanfei (to Wuxi Wugo)
33	MF	CHN	Ye Chongqiu (to Guangxi Pingguo Haliao)
37	MF	CHN	Yi Xianlong (loan return to Shandong Taishan)

=== Shenzhen ===
In:

No.	Pos.	Nation	Player

Out:

No.	Pos.	Nation	Player
1	GK	CHN	Wei Minzhe (to Wuhan Three Towns)
5	DF	CHN	Tian Ziyi (to Meizhou Hakka)
6	DF	CHN	Pei Shuai (to Qingdao West Coast)
7	FW	GHA	Frank Acheampong (to Henan)
9	FW	TPE	Will Donkin (to Shanghai Port)
12	DF	CHN	Liao Lei (to Nantong Zhiyun)
13	DF	CHN	Xu Haofeng (to Henan)
14	MF	CHN	Li Ning (to Meizhou Hakka)
16	FW	CHN	Zheng Dalun (to Cangzhou Mighty Lions)
17	MF	CHN	Fu Hao (to Wuxi Wugo)
18	FW	CHN	Chen Xiangyu (to Qingdao West Coast)
19	MF	CHN	Xu Yue (to Shijiazhuang Gongfu)
20	MF	CHN	Liu Yue (to Wuhan Three Towns)
27	DF	CHN	Yang Boyu (to Qingdao West Coast)
28	DF	CHN	Zhou Xin (to Shenzhen Juniors)
30	DF	CHN	Huang Ruifeng (to Henan)
32	GK	CHN	Ji Jiabao (to Qingdao West Coast)
34	FW	CHN	Shahsat Hujahmat (to Heilongjiang Ice City)
36	DF	CHN	Chen Guoliang (to Chengdu Rongcheng)
37	MF	CHN	Hu Jiajin (to Guangxi Pingguo Haliao)
42	MF	CHN	Li Wei (to Guizhou Zhucheng Athletic)

== See also ==
- 2024 Chinese Super League
- 2024 China League One
