= Liu Jiahui =

Liu Jiahui may refer to:

- Liu Jiahui (gymnast) (born 1996), Chinese rhythmic gymnast
- Liu Jiahui (footballer) (born 2001), Chinese footballer
- Gordon Liu (劉家輝; Liú Jiāhuī, born 1955), Hong Kong actor
