= Ji Jiabao =

Chinese footballer (born 2002)

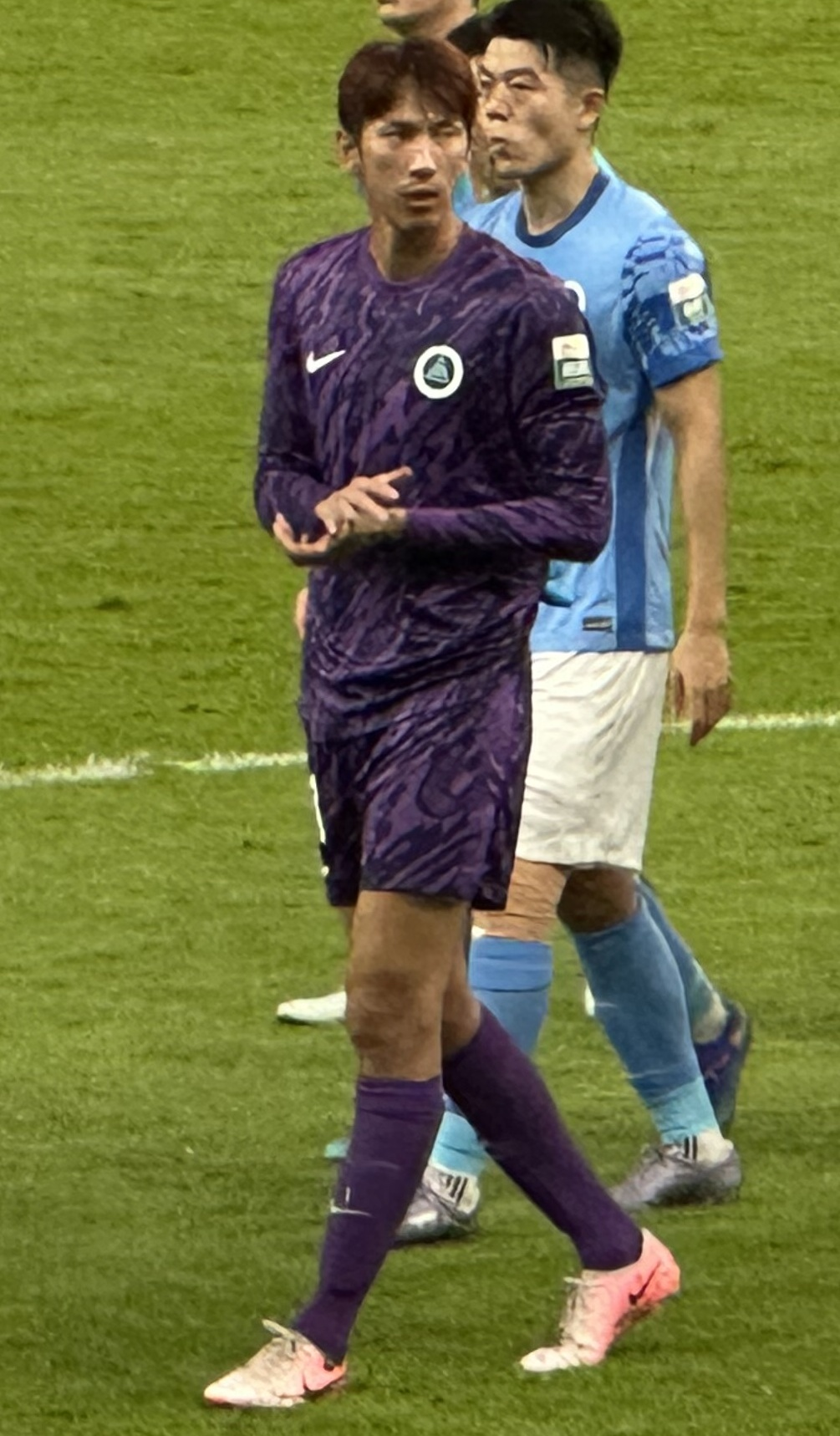
- Ji Jiabao in April 2025

Personal information
- Full name: Ji Jiabao
- Date of birth: 16 September 2002 (age 24)
- Place of birth: Jilin City, Jilin, China
- Height: 1.96 m (6 ft 5 in)
- Position: Goalkeeper

Team information
- Current team: Shenzhen Peng City
- Number: 1

Youth career
- 2015–2016: Guangzhou R&F
- 2016–2019: Zhuhai Suoka
- 2019–2022: Shenzhen FC

Senior career*
Years	Team	Apps	(Gls)
2022–2023	Shenzhen FC	2	(0)
2024	Qingdao West Coast	15	(0)
2025–	Shenzhen Peng City	24	(0)
- * Club domestic league appearances and goals as of 22 November 2026

Ji Jiabao (Chinese: 季家葆; pinyin: Jì Jiābǎo; born 16 September 2002) is a Chinese professional footballer who plays as a goalkeeper for Chinese Super League club Shenzhen Peng City.

== Early life ==
Born in Jilin City, Jilin as a single child, Ji Jiabao registered his hukou in Fuyang, Anhui, and moved to Shenzhen, Guangdong, with his family at a young age. Before Ji turned two years old, his father Yang Xiaoji started taking Ji to Yang's own amateur football games. Under his father's influence, Ji started playing football in Shenzhen. During third grade at the No. 4 Primary School of Shekou Yucai Education Group in Shenzhen, Ji joined the school football team as a forward, and cited Cristiano Ronaldo as his footballing idol. Later on, Ji became a goalkeeper due to his height.

In 2015, Ji Joined the youth academy of then-Chinese Super League outfit Guangzhou R&F. In 2016, Ji joined Zhuhai Suoka, where he stayed for three to four years.

== Career ==
=== Shenzhen FC ===
In March 2019, Ji Jiabao signed for the youth team of Shenzhen FC. Before the 2022 season, Ji was promoted to Shenzhen FC's first-team, wearing the number 32. On 19 December 2022, Ji made his senior and professional debut in an 8–0 league loss to Shandong Taishan, playing the full ninety minutes. On 29 October 2023, Ji made his only other appearance for the club in a 1–0 away league loss to defending Chinese Super League champions Wuhan Three Towns.

=== Qingdao West Coast ===
After Shenzhen FC ceased operations after the 2023 season, Ji Jiabao joined newly-promoted Chinese Super League side Qingdao West Coast on a free transfer on 24 February 2024, choosing the number 1 shirt. He immediately became the first-choice goalkeeper for the 2024 season. After a stand-out performance in a 1–0 home win against Qingdao Hainiu in the Qingdao derby on 30 March 2024, he was shortlisted as a candidate for the league's player of the round. After manager Hisashi Kurosaki's resignation in late July 2024, he was demoted to being Qingdao West Coast's second-choice goalkeeper.

=== Shenzhen Peng City ===
On 9 January 2025, Chinese Super League side Shenzhen Peng City announced the signing of Ji Jiabao on a free transfer. On 5 April 2025, he made his debut for the club in a 3–1 home league loss to Henan FC.

== Career statistics ==
As of match played 22 November 2025

Appearances and goals by club, season, and competition
Club	Season	League			Cup		Continental		Other		Total	
Club	Season	Division	Apps	Goals	Apps	Goals	Apps	Goals	Apps	Goals	Apps	Goals
Shenzhen FC	2022	Chinese Super League	1	0	0	0	–		–		1	0
Shenzhen FC	2023	Chinese Super League	1	0	0	0	–		–		1	0
Shenzhen FC	Total		2	0	0	0	0	0	0	0	2	0
Qingdao West Coast	2024	Chinese Super League	15	0	0	0	–		–		15	0
Shenzhen Peng City	2025	Chinese Super League	18	0	0	0	–		–		18	0
Career total			35	0	0	0	0	0	0	0	35	0
