= Wang Tengda =

Chinese footballer

Wang Tengda 王腾达
Personal information
- Date of birth: 18 February 2001 (age 25)
- Place of birth: Dalian, Liaoning, China
- Height: 1.81 m (5 ft 11 in)
- Position: Midfielder

Team information
- Current team: Dalian Young Boy
- Number: 11

Youth career
- –2020: Dalian Yifang

Senior career*
Years	Team	Apps	(Gls)
2021–2023	Dalian Professional	12	(0)
2024–	Dalian Young Boy	0	(0)
- * Club domestic league appearances and goals as of 31 December 2022

Wang Tengda (Chinese: 王腾达; pinyin: Wáng Téngdá; born 18 February 2001) is a Chinese footballer who currently plays for Dalian Young Boy.

== Club career ==
Wang Tengda started his football career with the Dalian Yifang youth team in 2019. In 2021, he was promoted to Dalian Professionals (previously Dalian Yifang) first team squad. He would make his professional debut in a Chinese FA Cup game on 29 October 2021 against Shanghai Port F.C. in a match that ended in a 0-0 draw. In the following season on 4 June 2022, he made his first Chinese Super League appearance against Henan Songshan Longmen in a game that ended in 2-2 draw.

== Career statistics ==
As of 31 December 2022.

Appearances and goals by club, season and competition
Club	Season	League			National Cup		Continental		Other		Total	
Club	Season	Division	Apps	Goals	Apps	Goals	Apps	Goals	Apps	Goals	Apps	Goals
Dalian Professional	2021	Chinese Super League	0	0	1	0	-		0 (Note: Appearance(s) in Relegation/Promotion Play-offs)	0	1	0
Dalian Professional	2022	Chinese Super League	12	0	0	0	-		-		12	0
Dalian Professional	Total		12	0	1	0	0	0	0	0	13	0
Career total			12	0	1	0	0	0	0	0	13	0
