= Zhang Yuanshu =

Chinese association football player

Personal information
- Date of birth: 25 May 1997 (age 29)
- Height: 1.80 m (5 ft 11 in)
- Position: Midfielder

Team information
- Current team: Zibo Cuju (on loan from Shandong Taishan)
- Number: 21

Youth career
- 2014–2018: Shandong Taishan
- 2015–2017: → Desportivo Brasil (youth loan)
- 2017: → São Paulo (youth loan)

Senior career*
Years	Team	Apps	(Gls)
2018–	Shandong Taishan	0	(0)
2018	→ Desportivo Brasil (loan)	1	(1)
2022–	→ Zibo Cuju (loan)	8	(0)
- * Club domestic league appearances and goals as of 14:01, 25 July 2022 (UTC)

Zhang Yuanshu (Chinese: 张源书; born 25 May 1997) is a Chinese footballer currently playing as a midfielder for Shandong Taishan.

== Club career ==
Zhang was loaned to Brazilian teams Desportivo Brasil and São Paulo during his youth development.

In May 2022, he was loaned to China League One side Zibo Cuju.

== Career statistics ==
=== Club ===
As of 25 July 2022.

Club	Season	League			State League		Cup		Continental		Other		Total	
Club	Season	Division	Apps	Goals	Apps	Goals	Apps	Goals	Apps	Goals	Apps	Goals	Apps	Goals
Shandong Taishan	2018	Chinese Super League	0	0	–		0	0	–		0	0	0	0
Shandong Taishan	2019	Chinese Super League	0	0	–		0	0	0	0	0	0	0	0
Shandong Taishan	2020	Chinese Super League	0	0	–		0	0	–		0	0	0	0
Shandong Taishan	2021	Chinese Super League	0	0	–		0	0	–		0	0	0	0
Shandong Taishan	2022	Chinese Super League	0	0	–		0	0	0	0	0	0	0	0
Shandong Taishan	Total		0	0	0	0	0	0	0	0	0	0	0	0
Desportivo Brasil (loan)	2018	–			1 (Note: Appearances in the Campeonato Paulista A3)	1	0	0	–		0	0	1	1
Zibo Cuju (loan)	2022	China League One	8	0	–		0	0	–		0	0	8	0
Career total			8	0	1	1	0	0	0	0	0	0	9	1
