= Lin Wenjie =

Chinese association football player

Personal information
- Date of birth: 18 May 2004 (age 22)
- Place of birth: Wuhan, Hubei, China
- Height: 1.78 m (5 ft 10 in)
- Position: Defender

Team information
- Current team: Wuhan Three Towns

Youth career
- –2021: Wuhan Three Towns

Senior career*
Years	Team	Apps	(Gls)
2021–2022	Wuhan Three Towns	0	(0)
2022	Hainan Star	14	(1)
2023–	Wuhan Three Towns	0	(0)

International career
- China U15
2020	China U16		
- * Club domestic league appearances and goals as of 14:01, 31 January 2023 (UTC)

Lin Wenjie (Chinese: 林文杰; born 18 May 2004) is a Chinese footballer currently playing as a defender for Wuhan Three Towns.

== Club career ==
Lin Wenjie was promoted to the senior team of second tier club Wuhan Three Towns in the 2021 China League One season and was handed his debut in a Chinese FA Cup game on 13 October 2021 against Chongqing Liangjiang Athletic in a 2-0 defeat. In his first season with the club he would be part of the squad that won the division title and gained promotion as the club entered the top tier for the first tine in their history. The following season he was brought back to the youth team and was allowed to join third tier club Hainan Star.

On 4 April 2023 he would rejoin Wuhan Three Towns for the start of the 2023 Chinese Super League campaign.

== Career statistics ==
As of 31 January 2023.

Club	Season	League			Cup		Continental		Other		Total	
Club	Season	Division	Apps	Goals	Apps	Goals	Apps	Goals	Apps	Goals	Apps	Goals
Wuhan Three Towns	2021	China League One	0	0	1	0	-		-		1	0
Hainan Star	2022	China League Two	14	1	-		-		-		14	1
Wuhan Three Towns	2023	Chinese Super League	0	0	0	0	0	0	0	0	0	0
Career total			14	1	1	0	0	0	0	0	15	1

== Honours ==
=== Club ===
Wuhan Three Towns

- China League One: 2021
