= Li Guanxi =

Chinese association football player

Personal information
- Date of birth: 25 September 1998 (age 28)
- Place of birth: Dezhou, Shandong, China
- Height: 1.89 m (6 ft 2 in)
- Position: Goalkeeper

Team information
- Current team: Nantong Zhiyun
- Number: 1

Youth career
- –2020: Shandong Luneng

Senior career*
Years	Team	Apps	(Gls)
2020–2024	Shandong Taishan	5	(0)
2023	→ Heilongjiang Ice City (loan)	7	(0)
2024	→ Shijiazhuang Gongfu (loan)	27	(0)
2025–	Nantong Zhiyun	30	(0)
- * Club domestic league appearances and goals as of 9 March 2026

Li Guanxi (Chinese: 李冠希; born 25 September 1998) is a Chinese footballer currently playing as a goalkeeper for Nantong Zhiyun.

== Club career ==
Li Guanxi was promoted to the senior team of Shandong Luneng (now renamed Shandong Taishan) within the 2020 Chinese Super League season and would make his debut in a league game against Hebei China Fortune F.C. on 26 October 2020 in a 2-2 draw, where he came on as a substitute for Wang Dalei. He would go on to establish himself as a reserve choice goalkeeper within the team throughout the league season and would be included in the squad within the 2020 Chinese FA Cup final against Jiangsu Suning F.C. that ended in a 2-0 victory. This would be followed by his first league title with the club when he was part of the team that won the 2021 Chinese Super League title.

== Career statistics ==
As of 31 December 2023.

Club	Season	League			Cup		Continental		Other		Total	
Club	Season	Division	Apps	Goals	Apps	Goals	Apps	Goals	Apps	Goals	Apps	Goals
Shandong Luneng/ Shandong Taishan	2020	Chinese Super League	1	0	0	0	–		–		1	0
Shandong Luneng/ Shandong Taishan	2021	Chinese Super League	1	0	0	0	-		-		1	0
Shandong Luneng/ Shandong Taishan	2022	Chinese Super League	3	0	0	0	0	0	-		3	0
Shandong Luneng/ Shandong Taishan	Total		5	0	0	0	0	0	0	0	5	0
Heilongjiang Ice City (loan)	2023	China League One	7	0	2	0	–		–		9	0
Career total			12	0	2	0	0	0	0	0	14	0

== Honours ==
=== Club ===
Shandong Luneng/ Shandong Taishan

- Chinese Super League: 2021.
- Chinese FA Cup: 2020, 2021, 2022.
