= Ma Yujun =

Chinese association football player

Personal information
- Date of birth: 15 February 2003 (age 23)
- Place of birth: Xinyang, Henan, China
- Height: 1.75 m (5 ft 9 in)
- Position: Midfielder

Team information
- Current team: Dalian K'un City (on loan from Chongqing Tonglianglong)
- Number: 42

Youth career
- –2020: Beijing Guoan

Senior career*
Years	Team	Apps	(Gls)
2020–2024	Beijing Guoan	0	(0)
2023	→ Nanjing City (loan)	5	(0)
2024	→ Heilongjiang Ice City (loan)	28	(2)
2025–	Chongqing Tonglianglong	8	(0)
2026–	→ Dalian K'un City (loan)	0	(0)
- * Club domestic league appearances and goals as of 14:01, 31 January 2023 (UTC)

Ma Yujun (Chinese: 马钰钧; born 15 February 2003) is a Chinese footballer currently playing as a midfielder for Dalian K'un City, on loan from Chongqing Tonglianglong.

== Club career ==
Ma Yujun was promoted to the senior team of Beijing Guoan within the 2020 Chinese Super League season. He would make his debut in a Chinese FA Cup game on 28 November 2020 against Chengdu Better City in a 1–0 victory. He would be given an opportunity to participate within senior games when he was part of the AFC Champions League squad, which was a mix of reserves and youth players to participate within centralized venues while the clubs senior players were still dealing with self-isolating measures due to COVID-19. He would make his continental debut in an AFC Champions League game on 26 June 2021 against United City F.C. in a 1–1 draw.

On 22 June 2026, Ma was loaned to China League One club Dalian K'un City.

== Career statistics ==
As of 31 January 2023.

Club	Season	League			Cup		Continental		Other		Total	
Club	Season	Division	Apps	Goals	Apps	Goals	Apps	Goals	Apps	Goals	Apps	Goals
Beijing Guoan	2020	Chinese Super League	0	0	2	0	0	0	-		2	0
Beijing Guoan	2021	Chinese Super League	0	0	0	0	6 (Note: Appearances in the AFC Champions League)	0	-		6	0
Beijing Guoan	2022	Chinese Super League	0	0	0	0	-		-		0	0
Beijing Guoan	Total		0	0	2	0	6	0	0	0	8	0
Career total			0	0	2	0	6	0	0	0	8	0
