= Wang Haoran =

Chinese footballer

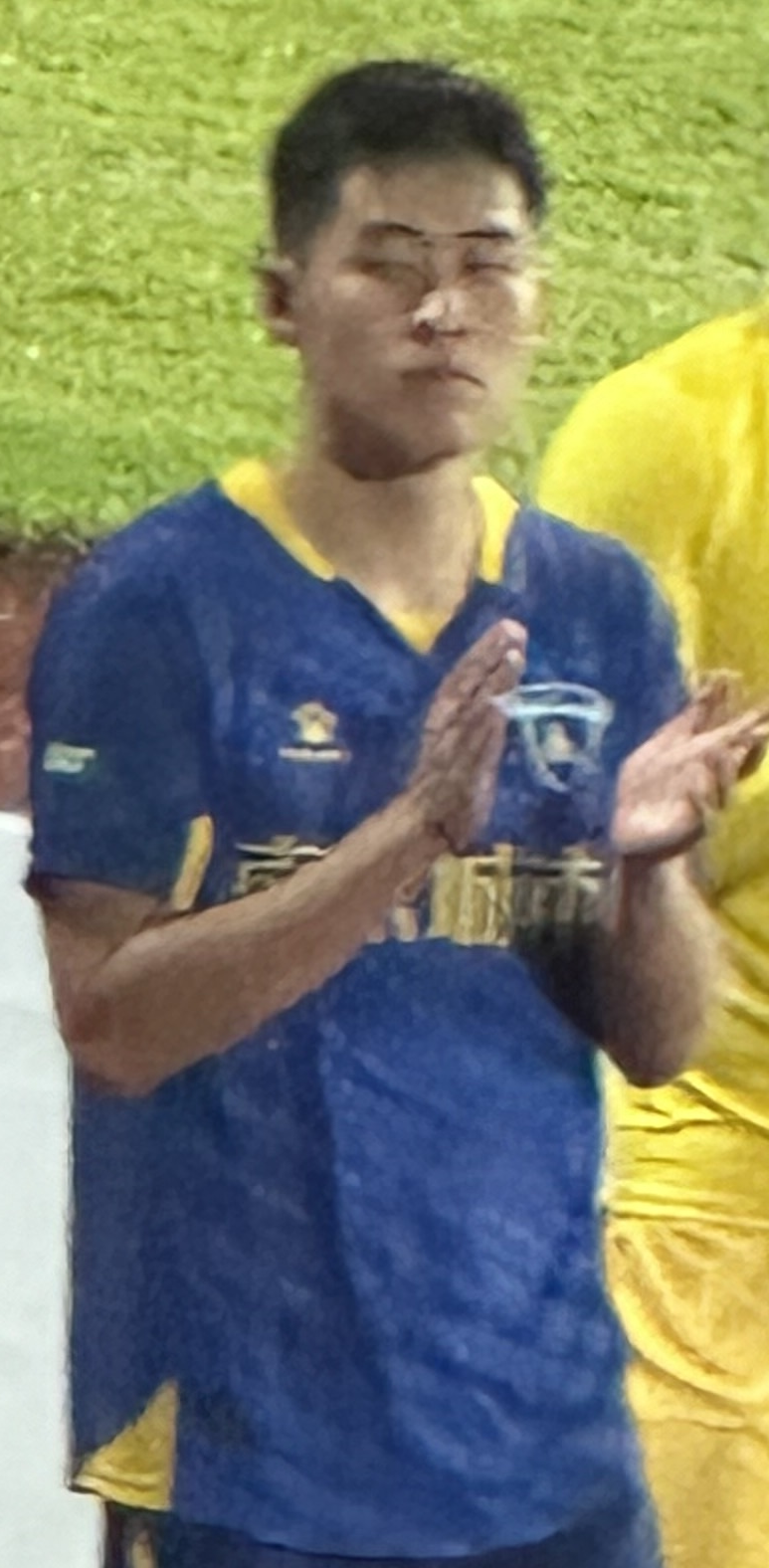
- Wang Haoran in August 2024

Personal information
- Date of birth: 19 January 2001 (age 25)
- Place of birth: Luoyang, Henan, China
- Height: 1.83 m (6 ft 0 in)
- Position: Midfielder

Team information
- Current team: Meizhou Hakka
- Number: 6

Youth career
- 2013–2016: Atlético Madrid
- 2016–2021: Henan Songshan Longmen

Senior career*
Years	Team	Apps	(Gls)
2021–2025	Henan FC	25	(0)
2024	→ Nanjing City (loan)	20	(0)
2025	→ Shanghai Jiading Huilong (loan)	17	(1)
2026–	Meizhou Hakka	10	(0)
- * Club domestic league appearances and goals as of 22:12, 30 May 2026 (UTC)

Wang Haoran (Chinese: 王浩然; born 19 January 2001) is a Chinese footballer currently playing as a midfielder for China League One club Meizhou Hakka.

== Club career ==
Wang was born in Luoyang, and was selected as one of thirty children to join the Atlético Madrid academy, as part of a Wanda Group initiative to encourage young Chinese footballers to play in Spain. After three years in Spain he returned to his hometown club of Henan Songshan Longmen (now simply renamed Henan FC) where he initially joined their youth team before being promoted to their senior team in the 2021 Chinese Super League season. He would make his senior debut in a league game on 15 September 2021 in a 1–1 draw against Guangzhou FC.

== Career statistics ==
As of 30 May 2026.

Club	Season	League			Cup		Continental		Other		Total	
Club	Season	Division	Apps	Goals	Apps	Goals	Apps	Goals	Apps	Goals	Apps	Goals
Henan Songshan Longmen/ Henan FC	2021	Chinese Super League	13	0	5	0	–		–		18	0
Henan Songshan Longmen/ Henan FC	2022	Chinese Super League	12	0	1	0	–		–		13	0
Henan Songshan Longmen/ Henan FC	2023	Chinese Super League	0	0	0	0	–		–		0	0
Henan Songshan Longmen/ Henan FC	Total		25	0	6	0	0	0	0	0	31	0
Nanjing City (loan)	2024	China League One	20	0	4	0	–		–		24	0
Shanghai Jiading Huilong (loan)	2025	China League One	17	1	1	0	–		–		18	1
Meizhou Hakka	2026	China League One	10	0	0	0	–		–		10	0
Career total			72	1	11	0	0	0	0	0	83	1
