= Yao Ben =

Chinese association football player

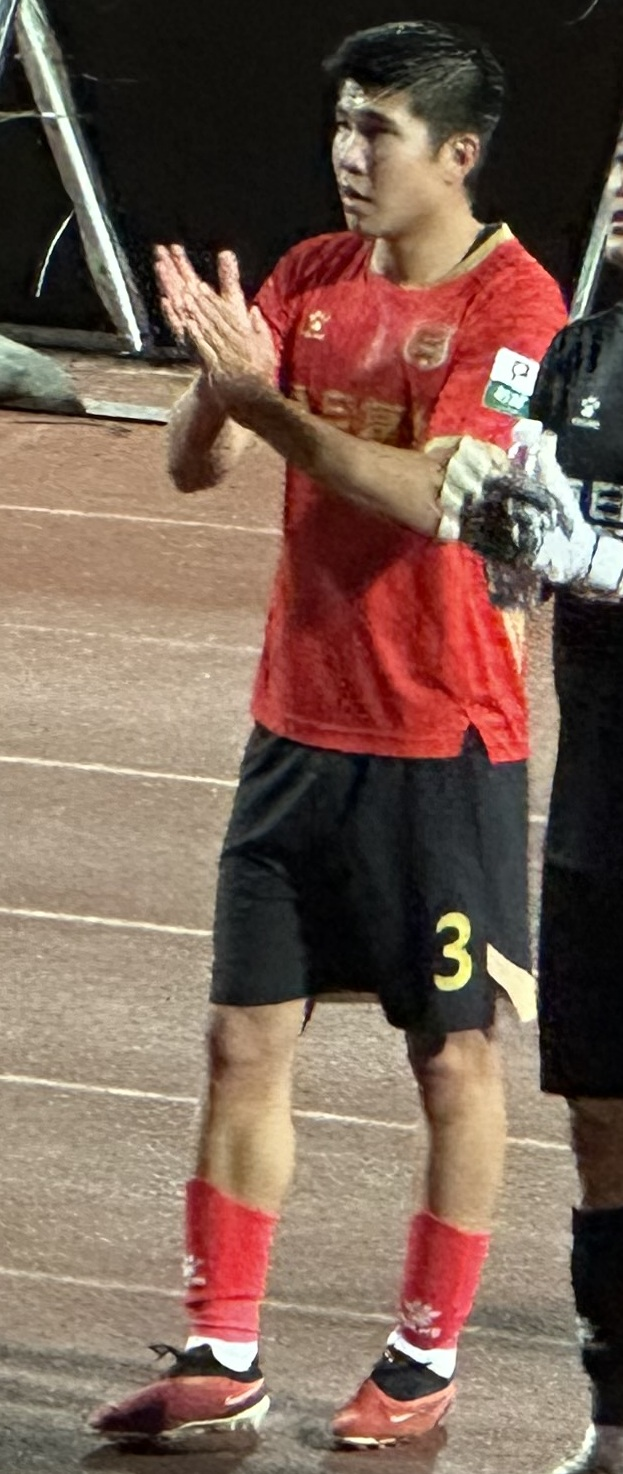
- Yao Ben in May 2025

Personal information
- Date of birth: 29 July 1997 (age 29)
- Place of birth: Xuzhou, China
- Height: 1.83 m (6 ft 0 in)
- Position: Defender

Team information
- Current team: Jiangsu Changjin

Youth career
- 2016–2020: Jiangsu Suning

Senior career*
Years	Team	Apps	(Gls)
2021–2022	Nantong Zhiyun	7	(0)
2023	Suzhou Dongwu	23	(1)
2024–2026	Ningbo Professional	42	(0)
2026–	Jiangsu Changjin	0	(0)
- * Club domestic league appearances and goals as of 14:02, 8 March 2026 (UTC)

Yao Ben (Chinese: 姚犇; born 29 July 1997) is a Chinese footballer currently playing as a defender for Jiangsu Changjin.

== Club career ==
Yao Ben played for the Jiangsu Suning youth and reserve teams until the clubs disbandment due to financial difficulties on 28 February 2021. He joined neighbouring second tier club Nantong Zhiyun on 11 April 2021. He made his senior debut in a league game on 9 September 2021 against Zibo Cuju in a 5–0 victory. The following league campaign he established himself as a squad player within the team and helped the club gain promotion to the top tier at the end of the 2022 China League One season.

== Career statistics ==
As of 22 June 2025.

Club	Season	League			Cup		Continental		Other		Total	
Club	Season	Division	Apps	Goals	Apps	Goals	Apps	Goals	Apps	Goals	Apps	Goals
Nantong Zhiyun	2021	China League One	2	0	1	0	–		–		3	0
Nantong Zhiyun	2022	China League One	5	0	1	0	–		–		6	0
Nantong Zhiyun	Total		7	0	2	0	0	0	0	0	9	0
Suzhou Dongwu	2023	China League One	23	1	1	0	–		–		24	1
Shanghai Jiading Huilong	2024	China League One	23	0	1	0	–		–		24	0
Shanghai Jiading Huilong	2025	China League One	12	0	0	0	–		–		12	0
Shanghai Jiading Huilong	Total		35	0	1	0	0	0	0	0	36	0
Career total			65	1	4	0	0	0	0	0	69	1
