= Zhang Mingxuan =

Chinese clergyman

Zhang Mingxuan is a Chinese clergyman and president of the Chinese House Church Alliance.

== Chinese House Church Alliance ==
Mingxuan is president of the Chinese House Church Alliance, an organization of unified Chinese house churches.

== Incidents involving law enforcement officials ==
Zhang has been the subject of repeated interrogation, detainment, and imprisonment for more than two decades. He has been noted for evangelizing to his interrogators.

Zhang was detained in 2008 after attempting to meet with an official of the European Union. During a subsequent raid of Zhang's Beijing home, one of his sons, Zhang Jian, was severely beaten by Public Security Bureau officials. Jian's younger brother, who rushed to his aid, was also beaten. Their mother then attempted to call for an ambulance, at which point she was informed by the emergency responder that government officials had issued orders not to dispatch emergency personnel to Zhang's home.
