= Xu Hui (footballer) =

South Korean footballer (born 1999)

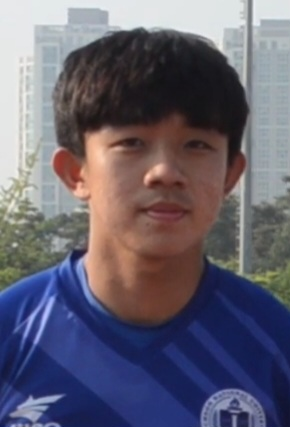
- Xu in 2019

Personal information
- Date of birth: 16 June 1999 (age 27)
- Place of birth: South Korea
- Height: 1.75 m (5 ft 9 in)
- Position: Defender

Team information
- Current team: Nantong Zhiyun
- Number: 2

Youth career
- 2015-2017: FC Seoul
- 2018-2021: Incheon National University

Senior career*
Years	Team	Apps	(Gls)
2023	Shanghai Jiading Huilong	1	(0)
2024	Heilongjiang Ice City	14	(0)
2025-	Nantong Zhiyun	26	(0)

International career
2019	South Korea U23		
- * Club domestic league appearances and goals as of 9 March 2026

Xu Hui or Xu Hwi (Chinese: 徐辉; pinyin: Xú Huī; Korean: 서휘; born 16 June 1999) is a footballer who plays as a defender for China League One club Nantong Zhiyun. Born in South Korea, Xu renounced his South Korean passport to receive the Chinese citizenship in 2023.

== Early life ==
Xu was born in 1999 in South Korea to a Chinese father from Shanghai and a South Korean mother.

== College career ==
Xu attended Incheon National University in South Korea, where he was regarded as one of the team's most important players.

== Club career ==
Xu started his career with Chinese side Shanghai Jiading Huilong.

On 27 February 2024, Xu joined fellow China League One club Heilongjiang Ice City.

== International career ==
Xu was called up to train with the South Korea national under-20 football team.

== Style of play ==
Xu mainly operates as a full-back and is known for his speed.

== Personal life ==
In 2023, Xu obtained Chinese citizenship.
