= He Xiaoqiang =

Chinese association football player

Personal information
- Date of birth: 5 June 2002 (age 24)
- Place of birth: Lijiang, Yunnan, China
- Height: 1.71 m (5 ft 7 in)
- Position: Left-back

Team information
- Current team: Chongqing Tonglianglong
- Number: 26

Youth career
- –2020: Beijing Guoan

Senior career*
Years	Team	Apps	(Gls)
2020–2024	Beijing Guoan	1	(0)
2023	→ Qingdao West Coast (loan)	11	(0)
2024	→ Dalian Yingbo (loan)	30	(1)
2025–	Chongqing Tonglianglong	55	(2)
- * Club domestic league appearances and goals as of 19 November 2026

He Xiaoqiang (Chinese: 和晓强; born 5 June 2002) is a Chinese footballer currently playing as a left-back for Chongqing Tonglianglong.

== Club career ==
He Xiaoqiang was promoted to the senior team of Beijing Guoan and made his debut in a 2020 Chinese FA Cup on 28 November 2020 against Chengdu Better City in a 1-0 victory. The following season in June 2021, despite not having registered a single league appearance with the club's first-team, he was given an opportunity to play at a continental level, as Beijing and the other Chinese teams involved in the AFC Champions League group stage sent a mix of reserves and youth players to the centralized venues: in fact, most of the senior players were still dealing with self-isolating measures to contrast COVID-19 following international matches, so the clubs involved chose to keep them in China, valuing performances in the national top-tier league over ACL fixtures. He made his continental debut in an AFC Champions League game on 29 June 2021 against Kawasaki Frontale in a 7-0 defeat. On 23 December 2022, He made his league debut against Guangzhou F.C. in a 3-1 victory.

On 18 January 2025, He joined China League One club Chongqing Tonglianglong.

== Career statistics ==
As of 11 January 2023.

Club	Season	League			Cup		Continental		Other		Total	
Club	Season	Division	Apps	Goals	Apps	Goals	Apps	Goals	Apps	Goals	Apps	Goals
Beijing Guoan	2020	Chinese Super League	0	0	2	0	0	0	–		2	0
Beijing Guoan	2021	Chinese Super League	0	0	1	0	2	0	–		3	0
Beijing Guoan	2022	Chinese Super League	1	0	0	0	–		–		1	0
Beijing Guoan	Total		1	0	3	0	2	0	0	0	6	0
Career total			1	0	3	0	2	0	0	0	6	0
