= Eysajan Kurban =

Chinese association football player

Personal information
- Date of birth: 6 January 2000 (age 26)
- Place of birth: Ili, Xinjiang, China
- Height: 1.74 m (5 ft 9 in)
- Positions: Left winger; forward

Team information
- Current team: Shanxi Chongde Ronghai
- Number: 7

Youth career
- –2020: Guangzhou Evergrande

Senior career*
Years	Team	Apps	(Gls)
2020	Guangzhou Evergrande	0	(0)
2020	→ Qingdao Qingchundao (loan)	9	(2)
2021–2023	Zhejiang Professional	23	(3)
2023	→ Heilongjiang Ice City (loan)	25	(3)
2024	Guangzhou FC	12	(1)
2025	Guangzhou Dandelion Alpha	1	(0)
2026–	Shanxi Chongde Ronghai	0	(0)
- * Club domestic league appearances and goals as of 10:40, 20 March 2026 (UTC)

Eysajan Kurban (Chinese: 艾沙江·库尔班; born 6 January 2000) is a Chinese footballer currently playing as a left winger or forward for China League Two club Shanxi Chongde Ronghai.

== Club career ==
Kurban was promoted to the senior team of Guangzhou before being loaned out to second tier football club Qingdao Qingchundao for the 2020 China League Two season. In the following league campaign he transferred to second tier club Zhejiang Professional where he made his debut in a league game on 24 April 2021 against Zibo Cuju in a 4-0 victory. This was followed by his first goal for the club on 5 May 2021 in a league game against Meizhou Hakka in a 1-0 victory. He was a squad player as the club gained promotion to the top tier at the end of the 2021 campaign. In the following campaign he was unable to establish himself as regular within the team and was loaned out to second tier club Heilongjiang Ice City.

On 26 February 2024, Kurban returned to Guangzhou on a free transfer for the start of the 2024 China League One campaign. He went on to make his debut for the club in a league game on 9 March 2024 against Heilongjiang Ice City in a 1-0 defeat.

== Career statistics ==
As of 26 March 2024.

Club	Season	League			Cup		Continental		Other		Total	
Club	Season	Division	Apps	Goals	Apps	Goals	Apps	Goals	Apps	Goals	Apps	Goals
Guangzhou FC	2020	Chinese Super League	0	0	0	0	0 (Note: Appearances in the AFC Champions League)	0	–		0	0
Guangzhou FC	2021	Chinese Super League	0	0	0	0	0	0	–		0	0
Guangzhou FC	Total		0	0	0	0	0	0	0	0	0	0
Qingdao Qingchundao (loan)	2020	China League Two	9	2	0	0	–		–		9	2
Zhejiang FC	2021	China League One	20	3	2	0	–		0 (Note: Appearances in Promotion/Relegation Play-offs)	0	22	3
Zhejiang FC	2022	Chinese Super League	3	0	4	1	–		–		7	1
Zhejiang FC	Total		23	3	6	1	0	0	0	0	29	4
Heilongjiang Ice City (loan)	2023	China League One	25	3	1	0	–		–		26	3
Guangzhou FC	2024	China League One	2	0	0	0	–		–		2	0
Career total			59	8	7	1	0	0	0	0	66	9
