= Nuali Zimin =

Chinese association football player

Personal information
- Date of birth: 13 January 2000 (age 26)
- Place of birth: Ürümqi, Xinjiang, China
- Height: 1.80 m (5 ft 11 in)
- Position: Midfielder

Team information
- Current team: Xiamen Feilu

Youth career
- 2019–2020: Sichuan Jiuniu

Senior career*
Years	Team	Apps	(Gls)
2019–2021	Sichuan Jiuniu	47	(6)
2020	→ Shaoxing Keqiao Yuejia (loan)	8	(0)
2022	Zibo Qisheng	10	(0)
2022–2023	Dandong Tengyue	34	(3)
2024–2026	Nantong Zhiyun	7	(1)
2024	→ Hunan Billows (loan)	8	(1)
2026–	Xiamen Feilu	0	(0)
- * Club domestic league appearances and goals as of 8 March 2026

Nuali Zimin (Chinese: 努艾力·孜明; born 13 January 2000) is a Chinese footballer currently playing as a midfielder for China League Two club Xiamen Feilu.

== Career statistics ==
As of 20 October 2024.

Club	Season	League			Cup		Continental		Other		Total	
Club	Season	Division	Apps	Goals	Apps	Goals	Apps	Goals	Apps	Goals	Apps	Goals
Sichuan Jiuniu	2019	China League Two	30	5	4 (Note: Appearances in the Chinese FA Cup)	0	–		2 (Note: Appearances in the China League Two playoffs)	1	36	6
Sichuan Jiuniu	2021	China League One	15	0	4	0	–		–		19	0
Sichuan Jiuniu	Total		45	5	8	0	0	0	2	1	55	6
Shaoxing Keqiao Yuejia (loan)	2020	China League Two	8	0	0	0	–		–		8	0
Zibo Qisheng	2022	China League Two	10	0	1	0	–		–		11	0
Dandong Tengyue	2022	China League Two	5	0	–		–		–		5	0
Dandong Tengyue	2023	China League One	29	3	2	0	–		–		31	3
Dandong Tengyue	Total		34	3	2	0	0	0	0	0	36	4
Nantong Zhiyun	2024	Chinese Super League	7	1	1	0	–		–		8	1
Hunan Billows (loan)	2024	China League Two	8	1	–		–		–		8	1
Career total			112	10	12	0	0	0	2	1	126	11
