= Zhang Xiangshuo =

Chinese association football player

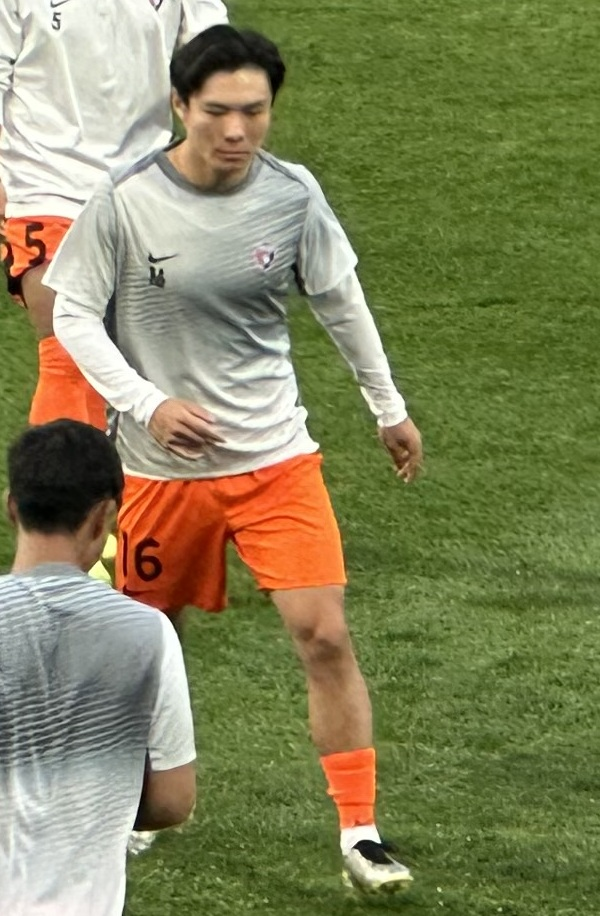
- Zhang Xiangshuo in May 2025

Personal information
- Date of birth: 22 June 2001 (age 25)
- Place of birth: Jining, Shandong, China
- Height: 1.81 m (5 ft 11 in)
- Positions: Left-back; midfielder

Team information
- Current team: Yunnan Yukun
- Number: 16

Youth career
- –2020: Shandong Luneng Taishan

Senior career*
Years	Team	Apps	(Gls)
2020–2021	Shaanxi Warriors Beyond	7	(0)
2021–2023	Cangzhou Mighty Lions	33	(1)
2024	Foshan Nanshi	14	(0)
2024	Guangxi Pingguo Haliao	12	(0)
2025–	Yunnan Yukun	14	(0)

International career^{‡}
2018	China U17	6	(0)
- * Club domestic league appearances and goals as of 19 November 2026 ‡ National team caps and goals as of 14:01, 17 May 2021 (UTC)

Zhang Xiangshuo (Chinese: 张祥硕; born 22 June 2001) is a Chinese footballer currently playing as a left-back or midfielder for Yunnan Yukun.

== Club career ==
On 14 April 2021, Zhang Xiangshuo left third tier football club Shaanxi Warriors Beyond to join top tier club Cangzhou Mighty Lions. He would make his debut for his new club on 14 May 2021 in a league game against Guangzhou City F.C. in a 0-0 draw. He would go on to score first goal for the club on 25 December 2021 in a league game against Wuhan in a 2-0 victory.

== Career statistics ==
As of 4 November 2023.

Club	Season	League			Cup		Continental		Other		Total	
Club	Season	Division	Apps	Goals	Apps	Goals	Apps	Goals	Apps	Goals	Apps	Goals
Shaanxi Warriors Beyond	2020	China League Two	7	0	0	0	–		–		7	0
Cangzhou Mighty Lions	2021	Chinese Super League	10	1	1	0	–		–		11	1
Cangzhou Mighty Lions	2022	Chinese Super League	13	0	4	0	–		–		17	0
Cangzhou Mighty Lions	2023	Chinese Super League	10	0	1	0	–		–		11	0
Cangzhou Mighty Lions	Total		33	1	6	0	0	0	0	0	39	1
Career total			40	1	6	0	0	0	0	0	46	1
