= Wei Minzhe =

Chinese footballer

Personal information
- Full name: Wei Minzhe
- Date of birth: November 26, 1998 (age 27)
- Place of birth: Dalian, Liaoning, China
- Height: 1.93 m (6 ft 4 in)
- Position: Goalkeeper

Team information
- Current team: Shenzhen Peng City (on loan from Wuhan Three Towns)
- Number: 35

Youth career
- 2016: JEF United Chiba
- 2017–2020: Ryutsu Keizai University FC

Senior career*
Years	Team	Apps	(Gls)
2019–2020	RKD Ryugasaki	7	(0)
2021–2023	Shenzhen FC	17	(0)
2024–	Wuhan Three Towns	4	(0)
2024	→ Shenzhen Peng City (loan)	8	(0)
2026–	→ Shenzhen Peng City (loan)	0	(0)
- * Club domestic league appearances and goals as of 28 August 2025

Wei Minzhe (Chinese: 魏黾哲; born 26 November 1998) is a Chinese professional footballer who plays as a goalkeeper for Chinese Super League club Shenzhen Peng City, on loan from Wuhan Three Towns

== Early life ==
Born in Dalian, Liaoning, Wei studied at the Dalian Northeast Road Primary School. He moved to Japan with his parents at the age of 11, and trained with the youth team of JEF United Chiba.

== Club career ==
Wei played well for JEF United Chiba U18s, helping them to be promoted to the Kogennomiya Cup National Group. After that, he played for the Japan University of Circulation and Economics and played well.

Wei Minzhe made his debut for Shenzhen against Wuhan Three Towns on November 26, 2022. He ended the 2022 Chinese Super League season on two appearances.

In 2026 season, Wei was loan out to Shenzhen Peng City again.

== Style of play ==
Wei is known for his height, standing at 1.98 m tall.

== Career statistics ==
As of 31 December 2024.

Club	Season	League			Cup		Continental		Other		Total	
Club	Season	Division	Apps	Goals	Apps	Goals	Apps	Goals	Apps	Goals	Apps	Goals
Ryutsu Keizai University FC	2018	Japanese Regional Leagues	0	0	2	0	–		–		2	0
RKD Ryugasaki	2019	Japan Football League	7	0	0	0	–		–		7	0
Shenzhen	2021	Chinese Super League	0	0	0	0	–		–		0	0
Shenzhen	2022	Chinese Super League	2	0	1	0	–		–		3	0
Shenzhen	2023	Chinese Super League	15	0	0	0	–		–		15	0
Shenzhen	Total		17	0	1	0	0	0	0	0	18	0
Wuhan Three Towns	2024	Chinese Super League	1	0	0	0	–		–		1	0
Wuhan Three Towns	2025	Chinese Super League	0	0	0	0	–		–		1	0
Wuhan Three Towns	Total		1	0	0	0	0	0	0	0	1	0
Shenzhen Peng City (loan)	2024	Chinese Super League	8	0	1	0	–		–		9	0
Career total			33	0	4	0	0	0	0	0	37	0
