= Hu Jiaqi =

Chinese association football player

Personal information
- Date of birth: 13 August 2001 (age 25)
- Place of birth: Nanchang, Jiangxi, China
- Height: 1.70 m (5 ft 7 in)
- Position: Midfielder

Team information
- Current team: Beijing IT

Youth career
- –2021: Beijing Guoan

Senior career*
Years	Team	Apps	(Gls)
2021–2023	Beijing Guoan	1	(0)
2023	→ Beijing IT (loan)	22	(2)
2024–2025	Jiangxi Lushan	23	(2)
2025–2026	Wuxi Wugo	11	(0)
2025	→ Beijing IT (loan)	14	(2)
2026–	Beijing IT	0	(0)

International career^{‡}
2020	China U19		
2021	China U20		
- * Club domestic league appearances and goals as of 18:38, 8 March 2026 (UTC) ‡ National team caps and goals as of 14:01, 26 June 2021 (UTC)

Hu Jiaqi (Chinese: 胡嘉祺; born 13 August 2001) is a Chinese footballer currently playing as a midfielder for China League Two club Beijing IT.

== Club career ==
Hu Jiaqi would play for the Beijing Guoan youth team and to gain more playing time he would be loaned out to the China U19 team who were allowed to take part in the third tier of the Chinese pyramid. On his return he would be given an opportunity to participate within senior games when he was part of the AFC Champions League squad, which was a mix of reserves and youth players to participate within centralized venues while the clubs senior players were still dealing with self-isolating measures due to COVID-19. He would make his continental debut in an AFC Champions League game on 26 June 2021 against United City F.C. in a 1–1 draw. He would go on to make his debut in a league game on 23 December 2022 against Guangzhou F.C. in a 3–1 victory.

== Career statistics ==
As of 01 July 2024.

Club	Season	League			Cup		Continental		Other		Total	
Club	Season	Division	Apps	Goals	Apps	Goals	Apps	Goals	Apps	Goals	Apps	Goals
Beijing Guoan	2020	Chinese Super League	0	0	0	0	0	0	-		0	0
Beijing Guoan	2021	Chinese Super League	0	0	0	0	6 (Note: Appearances in the AFC Champions League)	0	-		6	0
Beijing Guoan	2022	Chinese Super League	1	0	0	0	-		-		1	0
Beijing Guoan	Total		1	0	0	0	6	0	0	0	7	0
China U19 (Loan)	2020	China League Two	6	0	-		-		-		6	0
China U20 (Loan)	2021	China League Two	3	0	0	0	-		-		3	0
Beijing IT (Loan)	2023	China League Two	22	2	2	1	-		-		24	3
Jiangxi Lushan	2024	China League One	14	2	2	0	-		-		16	2
Career total			46	4	4	1	6	0	0	0	56	5
