= Zhao Ziye =

Chinese footballer (born 2003)

Personal information
- Date of birth: 1 October 2003 (age 23)
- Place of birth: Hebei, China
- Height: 1.80 m (5 ft 11 in)
- Position: Forward

Team information
- Current team: Wuhan Three Towns B
- Number: 19

Youth career
- Atlético Madrid
- Hebei FC

Senior career*
Years	Team	Apps	(Gls)
2022	Hebei FC	21	(2)
2023	Sichuan Jiuniu	18	(0)
2024	Guangxi Pingguo Haliao	2	(0)
2024	→ Wuxi Wugou (loan)	12	(2)
2025–2026	Shijiazhuang Gongfu	16	(0)
2026–	Wuhan Three Towns B	0	(0)
- * Club domestic league appearances and goals as of 12:22, 21 October 2023 (UTC)

Zhao Ziye (Chinese: 赵梓业; born 1 October 2003) is a Chinese footballer currently playing as a forward for Wuhan Three Towns B.

== Club career ==
Zhao was selected as one of fifty young Chinese footballers to join the academy of Spanish side Atlético Madrid, as part of Wanda Group's "China Football Hope Star" initiative to encourage the development of young Chinese footballers.

On his return to China, he joined Hebei FC, and went on to score his first goal for the club in August 2022, in a 4–3 loss to Tianjin Jinmen Tiger.

He joined Chinese League One side Sichuan Jiuniu on April 14, 2023 on a free transfer after Hebei FC dissolved in the previous month.

On 22 July 2026, Zhao transferred to China League Two side Wuhan Three Towns B.

== Career statistics ==
=== Club ===
As of 21 October 2023.

Appearances and goals by club, season and competition
Club	Season	League			Cup		Continental		Other		Total	
Club	Season	Division	Apps	Goals	Apps	Goals	Apps	Goals	Apps	Goals	Apps	Goals
Hebei FC	2022	Chinese Super League	21	2	1 (Note: Appearances in the Chinese FA Cup)	0	0	0	0	0	22	2
Sichuan Jiuniu	2023	Chinese League One	18	0	0	0	0	0	0	0	18	0
Career total			39	2	1	0	0	0	0	0	40	2
