= Zhang Yu (footballer, born 2002) =

Chinese association football player

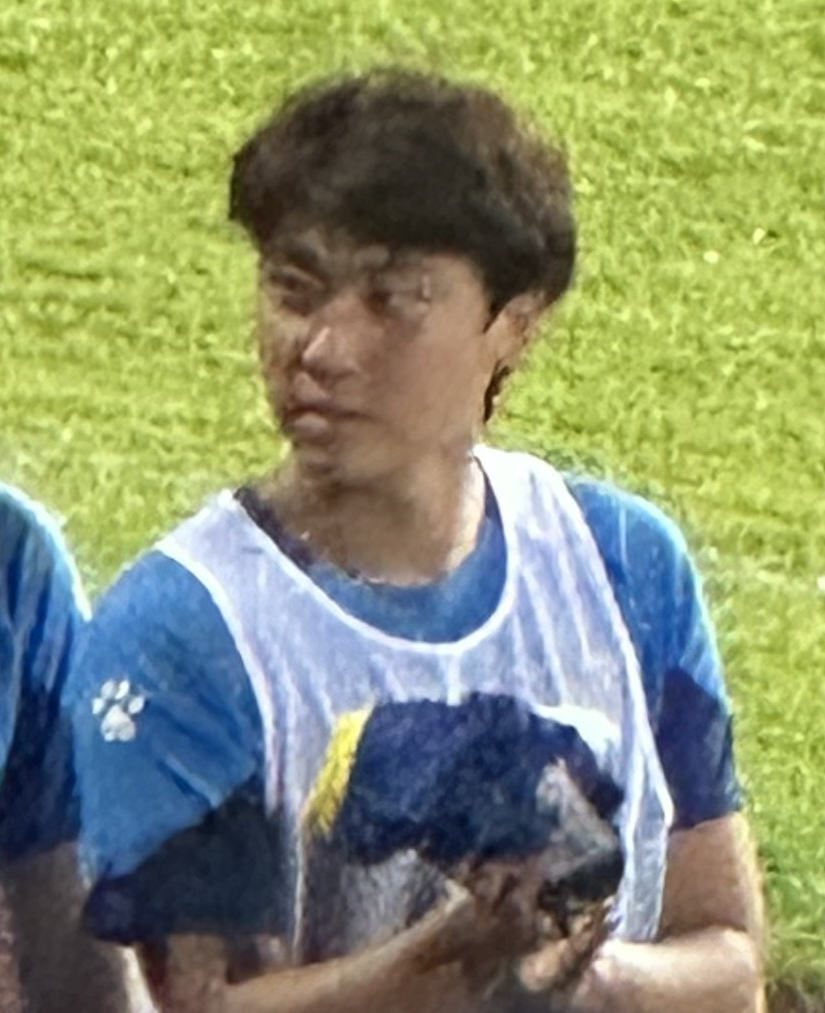
- Zhang Yu in August 2024

Personal information
- Date of birth: 14 July 2002 (age 24)
- Height: 1.87 m (6 ft 2 in)
- Position: Defender

Team information
- Current team: Nanjing City
- Number: 24

Senior career*
| Years | Team | Apps | (Gls) |
| 2019–2022 | Hebei FC | 24 | (1) |
| 2023 | Dongguan Guanlian | 0 | (0) |
| 2023 | Nantong Zhiyun | 0 | (0) |
| 2024- | Nanjing City | 3 | (0) |

International career^{‡}
| 2018 | China U17 | 3 | (0) |
- * Club domestic league appearances and goals as of 14:01, 31 December 2020 (UTC) ‡ National team caps and goals as of 14:01, 6 December 2019 (UTC)

Zhang Yu (simplified Chinese: 张禹; traditional Chinese: 張禹; pinyin: Zhāng Yǔ; born 14 July 2002) is a Chinese footballer currently playing as a defender for Nanjing City.

== Club career ==
Zhang Yu was promoted to the senior team of Hebei China Fortune in the 2019 league season. He was handed his debut in a league game by the Head coach Xie Feng on 27 November 2019 against Guangzhou Evergrande in a 3–1 defeat where he came on as a substitute for Wang Qiuming.

== Career statistics ==
As of 31 December 2020.

Appearances and goals by club, season and competition
| Club | Season | League | | | National Cup | | Continental | | Other | | Total | |
| Club | Season | Division | Apps | Goals | Apps | Goals | Apps | Goals | Apps | Goals | Apps | Goals |
|---|---|---|---|---|---|---|---|---|---|---|---|---|
| Hebei China Fortune | 2019 | Chinese Super League | 2 | 0 | 0 | 0 | – | | – | | 2 | 0 |
| Hebei China Fortune | 2020 | Chinese Super League | 1 | 0 | 1 | 0 | – | | – | | 2 | 0 |
| Hebei China Fortune | Total | | 3 | 0 | 1 | 0 | 0 | 0 | 0 | 0 | 4 | 0 |
| Career total | | | 3 | 0 | 1 | 0 | 0 | 0 | 0 | 0 | 4 | 0 |
