= Wei Chaolun =

Chinese association football player

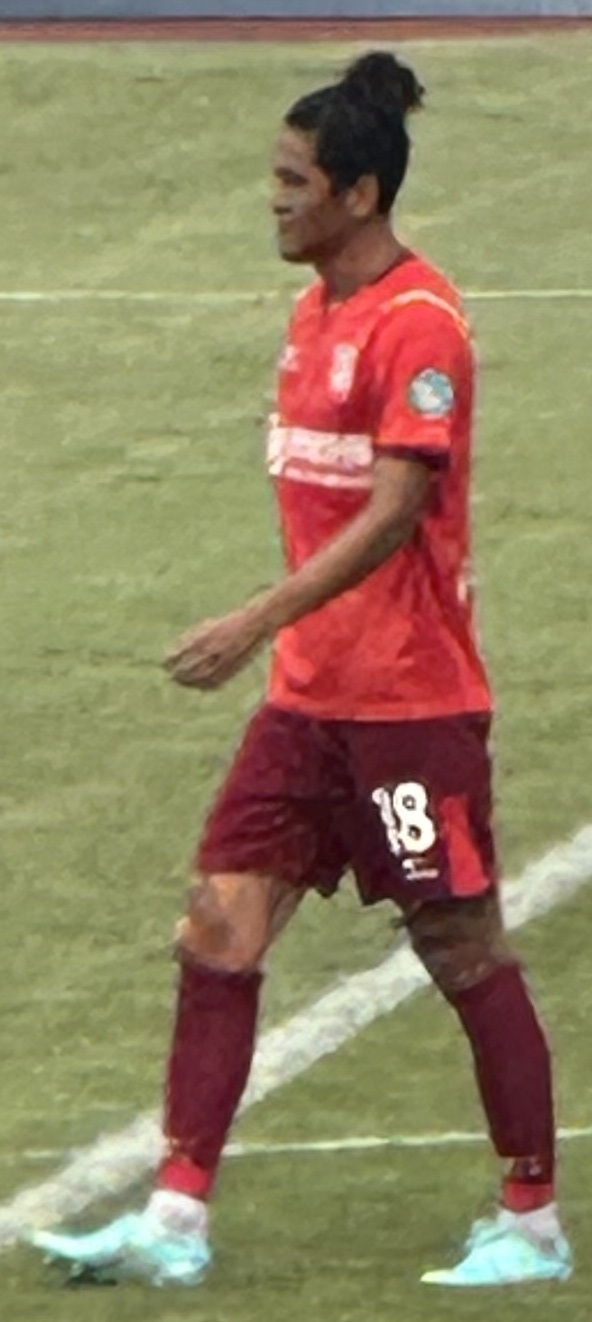
- Wei Chaolun in August 2024

Personal information
- Date of birth: 21 May 2000 (age 26)
- Height: 1.83 m (6 ft 0 in)
- Position: Midfielder

Team information
- Current team: Beijing BSU
- Number: 18

Youth career
- –2019: Beijing BSU

Senior career*
Years	Team	Apps	(Gls)
2019–	Beijing BSU	19	(1)
2019	→ Suzhou Dongwu (loan)	10	(1)
- * Club domestic league appearances and goals as of 14:01, 24 August 2021 (UTC)

Wei Chaolun (Chinese: 魏超伦; born 21 May 2000) is a Chinese footballer currently playing as a Centre Forward for GX Hengchen.

== Career statistics ==
=== Club ===
As of 24 August 2021.

Club	Season	League			Cup		Other		Total	
Club	Season	Division	Apps	Goals	Apps	Goals	Apps	Goals	Apps	Goals
Beijing BSU	2019	China League One	0	0	2 (Note: Appearances in the Chinese FA Cup)	0	0	0	2	0
Beijing BSU	2020	China League One	5	0	0	0	0	0	5	0
Beijing BSU	2021	China League One	14	1	0	0	0	0	14	1
Beijing BSU	Total		19	1	2	0	0	0	21	1
Suzhou Dongwu	2019	China League Two	10	1	0	0	6 (Note: Appearances in the China League Two playoffs)	1	16	2
Career total			29	2	2	0	6	1	37	3
