= Yang Yixuan =

Chinese association football player

Personal information
- Date of birth: 30 June 2001 (age 25)
- Place of birth: Chongqing, China
- Height: 1.81 m (5 ft 11 in)
- Position: Left winger

Team information
- Current team: Shanxi Chongde Ronghai
- Number: 23

Youth career
- –2021: Hebei FC

Senior career*
Years	Team	Apps	(Gls)
2021–2022	Hebei FC	8	(0)
2023	Chongqing Tonglianglong	1	(0)
2024	Chongqing Chunlei	3	(0)
2024–2025	Shaanxi Northwest Qingnianren	7	(0)
2025	Ganzhou Ruishi	9	(0)
2026–	Shanxi Chongde Ronghai	0	(0)
- * Club domestic league appearances and goals as of 10:47, 20 March 2026 (UTC)

Yang Yixuan (Chinese: 杨翼璇; born 30 June 2001) is a Chinese footballer currently playing as a left winger for China League Two club Shanxi Chongde Ronghai.

== Club career ==
Yang Yixuan was promoted to the senior team of Hebei FC within the 2021 Chinese Super League season and would make his debut in a Chinese FA Cup game on 14 October 2021 against Shaanxi Chang'an Athletic in a 1-0 defeat. This would be followed by his first league appearance on 26 December 2021 against Shandong Taishan in a 2-0 defeat.

== Career statistics ==
As of 20 November 2022.

Club	Season	League			Cup		Other		Total	
Club	Season	Division	Apps	Goals	Apps	Goals	Apps	Goals	Apps	Goals
Hebei FC	2021	Chinese Super League	1	0	1	0	0	0	2	0
Hebei FC	2022	Chinese Super League	5	0	1	0	0	0	6	0
Career total			6	0	2	0	0	0	8	0
