= Ling Jie (footballer) =

Chinese association football player

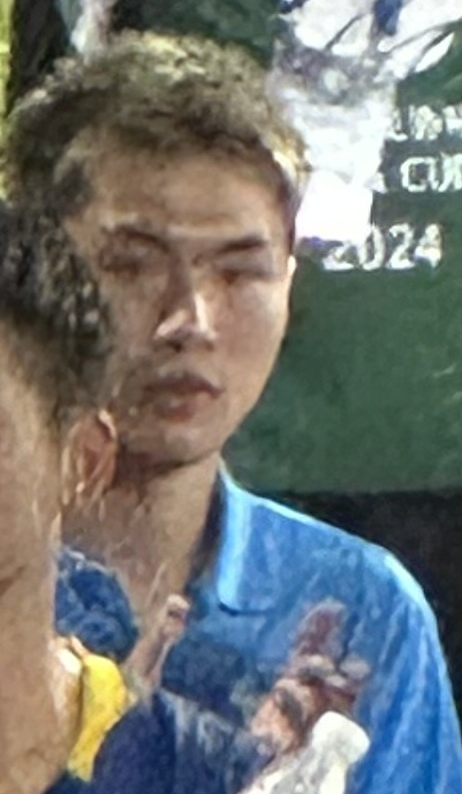
- Ling Jie in August 2024

Personal information
- Date of birth: 22 January 2003 (age 23)
- Place of birth: Nantong, Jiangsu, China
- Height: 1.78 m (5 ft 10 in)
- Position: Forward

Team information
- Current team: Nantong Zhiyun
- Number: 17

Youth career
- –2021: Guangzhou Evergrande

Senior career*
| Years | Team | Apps | (Gls) |
| 2021–2023 | Guangzhou FC | 31 | (4) |
| 2024–2025 | Nanjing City | 46 | (3) |
| 2026– | Nantong Zhiyun | 0 | (0) |
- * Club domestic league appearances and goals as of 23 December 2022

Ling Jie (Chinese: 凌杰; born 22 January 2003) is a Chinese footballer currently playing as a forward for Nantong Zhiyun.

== Career statistics ==
=== Club ===
As of match played 31 December 2025.

Appearances and goals by club, season and competition
| Club | Season | League | | | Cup | | Continental | | Other | | Total | |
| Club | Season | Division | Apps | Goals | Apps | Goals | Apps | Goals | Apps | Goals | Apps | Goals |
|---|---|---|---|---|---|---|---|---|---|---|---|---|
| Guangzhou FC | 2021 | Chinese Super League | 9 | 2 | 1 | 0 | 0 | 0 | – | | 10 | 2 |
| Guangzhou FC | 2022 | Chinese Super League | 22 | 2 | 1 | 1 | 0 | 0 | – | | 23 | 3 |
| Guangzhou FC | 2023 | China League One | 29 | 2 | 2 | 0 | – | | – | | 31 | 2 |
| Guangzhou FC | Total | | 60 | 6 | 4 | 1 | 0 | 0 | 0 | 0 | 64 | 7 |
| Nanjing City | 2024 | China League One | 26 | 2 | 3 | 0 | – | | – | | 29 | 2 |
| Nanjing City | 2025 | China League One | 20 | 1 | 1 | 0 | – | | – | | 21 | 1 |
| Nanjing City | Total | | 46 | 3 | 4 | 0 | 0 | 0 | 0 | 0 | 50 | 3 |
| Career total | | | 106 | 9 | 8 | 1 | 0 | 0 | 0 | 0 | 114 | 10 |
