= Guo Tong =

Chinese association football player

Personal information
- Date of birth: 19 February 2002 (age 24)
- Height: 1.83 m (6 ft 0 in)
- Position: Goalkeeper

Team information
- Current team: Shanghai Second

Youth career
- –2021: Shanghai Port
- 2023: Nantong Zhiyun

Senior career*
| Years | Team | Apps | (Gls) |
| 2021–2022 | Shanghai Port | 0 | (0) |
| 2022 | → Ji'nan Xingzhou (loan) | 0 | (0) |
| 2023–2024 | Nantong Zhiyun | 0 | (0) |
| 2024-2025 | Suzhou Dongwu | 0 | (0) |
| 2025-2026 | Guizhou Guiyang Athletic | 1 | (0) |
| 2026– | Shanghai Second | 0 | (0) |

International career
- China U19
- China U20
- * Club domestic league appearances and goals as of 12:12, 8 March 2026 (UTC)

Guo Tong (Chinese: 郭通; born 19 February 2002) is a Chinese footballer currently playing as a goalkeeper for China League Two club Shanghai Second.

== Career statistics ==
=== Club ===
As of 9 July 2021.

| Club | Season | League | | | Cup | | Continental | | Other | | Total | |
| Club | Season | Division | Apps | Goals | Apps | Goals | Apps | Goals | Apps | Goals | Apps | Goals |
|---|---|---|---|---|---|---|---|---|---|---|---|---|
| Shanghai Port | 2021 | Chinese Super League | 0 | 0 | 0 | 0 | 1 (Note: Appearances in AFC Champions League qualification) | 0 | 0 | 0 | 1 | 0 |
| Career total | | | 0 | 0 | 0 | 0 | 1 | 0 | 0 | 0 | 1 | 0 |
