= Song Haoyu =

Chinese association football player

Personal information
- Date of birth: 28 April 2002 (age 24)
- Place of birth: Linyi, Shandong, China
- Height: 1.70 m (5 ft 7 in)
- Position: Right-back

Team information
- Current team: Shijiazhuang Gongfu, (on loan from Qingdao West Coast)
- Number: 12

Senior career*
Years	Team	Apps	(Gls)
2021–2025	Nantong Zhiyun	67	(0)
2023	→ Shijiazhuang Gongfu (loan)	22	(1)
2025–	Qingdao West Coast	12	(0)
2026–	→ Shijiazhuang Gongfu (loan)	0	(0)
- * Club domestic league appearances and goals as of 26 August 2025

Song Haoyu (Chinese: 宋浩宇; born 28 April 2002) is a Chinese footballer currently playing as a right-back for Shijiazhuang Gongfu, on loan from Qingdao West Coast.

== Club career ==
Song Haoyu would be promoted to the senior team of Nantong Zhiyun for the beginning of the 2021 China League One season. He would go on to make his debut in a league game on 25 April 2021 against Nanjing City in a 1-1 draw. He would go on to establish himself within the team and helped the club gain promotion to the top tier at the end of the 2022 China League One season.

On 3 July 2026, Song was loaned out to China League One side Shijiazhuang Gongfu again.

== Career statistics ==
As of 31 December 2022.

Club	Season	League			Cup		Continental		Other		Total	
Club	Season	Division	Apps	Goals	Apps	Goals	Apps	Goals	Apps	Goals	Apps	Goals
Nantong Zhiyun	2021	China League One	30	0	1	0	–		–		31	0
Nantong Zhiyun	2022	China League One	25	0	1	0	–		–		26	0
Nantong Zhiyun	Total		55	0	2	0	0	0	0	0	57	0
Career total			55	0	2	0	0	0	0	0	57	0
