= Chen Rijin =

Chinese association football player

Personal information
- Date of birth: 17 January 1999 (age 27)
- Height: 1.71 m (5 ft 7 in)
- Position: Defender

Team information
- Current team: Guangdong Mingtu
- Number: 12

Youth career
- –2021: Guangzhou Evergrande

Senior career*
Years	Team	Apps	(Gls)
2021–2023	Guangzhou FC	21	(0)
2024	Jiangxi Dark Horse Junior	0	(0)
2024–	Guangdong Mingtu	7	(0)
- * Club domestic league appearances and goals as of 14:01, 25 June 2021 (UTC)

Chen Rijin (simplified Chinese: 陈日金; traditional Chinese: 陳日金; pinyin: Chén Rìjīn; born 17 January 1999) is a Chinese footballer currently playing as a defender for Guangdong Mingtu.

== Career statistics ==
=== Club ===
As of 31 December 2022.

Club	Season	League			Cup		Continental		Other		Total	
Club	Season	Division	Apps	Goals	Apps	Goals	Apps	Goals	Apps	Goals	Apps	Goals
Guangzhou FC	2021	Chinese Super League	0	0	1	0	5 (Note: Appearances in the AFC Champions League)	0	—		6	0
Guangzhou FC	2022	Chinese Super League	12	0	1	0	0	0	—		13	0
Guangzhou FC	Total		12	0	2	0	5	0	0	0	19	0
Career total			12	0	2	0	5	0	0	0	19	0
