= Li Jiaheng =

Chinese association football player

Personal information
- Date of birth: 15 October 2001 (age 25)
- Place of birth: Daqing, Heilongjiang, China
- Height: 1.84 m (6 ft 0 in)
- Position: Midfielder

Team information
- Current team: Wenzhou FC
- Number: 9

Youth career
- –2020: Guangzhou Evergrande

Senior career*
Years	Team	Apps	(Gls)
2020–2024	Guangzhou FC	13	(1)
2021	→ China U20 (loan)	20	(5)
2023	→ Jiangxi Dark Horse Junior (loan)	14	(1)
2024	→ Foshan Nanshi (loan)	15	(2)
2025	Guangzhou Dandelion	15	(1)
2026–	Wenzhou FC	0	(0)
- * Club domestic league appearances and goals as of 00:04, 12 March 2026 (UTC)

Li Jiaheng (Chinese: 李佳珩; born 15 October 2001) is a Chinese footballer currently playing as a midfielder for China League Two club Wenzhou FC.

== Career statistics ==
=== Club ===
As of 15 January 2022.

Club	Season	League			Cup		Continental		Other		Total	
Club	Season	Division	Apps	Goals	Apps	Goals	Apps	Goals	Apps	Goals	Apps	Goals
Guangzhou	2020	Chinese Super League	0	0	1 (Note: Appearances in the Chinese FA Cup)	0	0	0	0	0	1	0
Guangzhou	2021	Chinese Super League	0	0	0	0	0	0	0	0	0	0
Guangzhou	Total		0	0	1	0	0	0	0	0	1	0
China U20 (loan)	2021	China League Two	20	5	1	0	–		0	0	21	5
Career total			20	5	2	0	0	0	0	0	22	5
