= Liu Jiahui (footballer) =

Chinese footballer

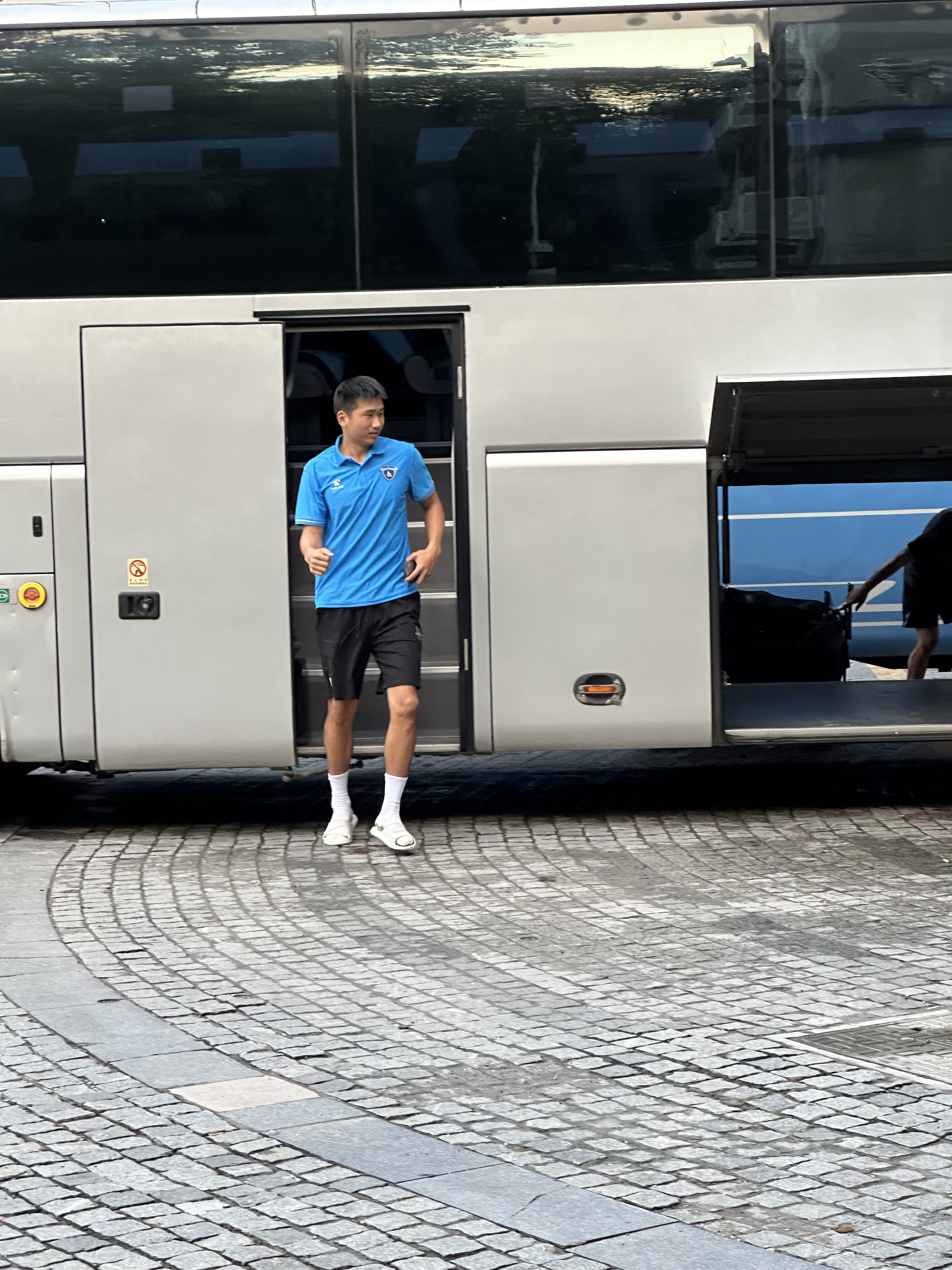
- Liu Jiahui in August 2024

Personal information
- Date of birth: 25 January 2001 (age 25)
- Place of birth: Zhengzhou, Henan, China
- Height: 1.86 m (6 ft 1 in)
- Position: Defender

Team information
- Current team: Henan FC
- Number: 5

Youth career
- –2021: Henan Songshan Longmen

Senior career*
Years	Team	Apps	(Gls)
2021–	Henan FC	27	(0)
2024	→ Nanjing City (loan)	28	(4)
2025	→ Dingnan United (loan)	17	(0)

International career
2016	China U15		
- * Club domestic league appearances and goals as of 22 November 2026

Liu Jiahui (Chinese: 刘家辉; born 25 January 2001) is a Chinese footballer currently playing as a defender for Henan FC.

== Club career ==
Liu Jiahui would play for the Henan Jianye (now known as Henan FC) youth team as well as being called up to the Chinese U15 team. He would go on to be promoted to the senior team of Henan within the 2021 Chinese Super League season and would make his debut in a league game on 15 July 2021 against Guangzhou FC in a 1-1 draw where he came on as a substitute for Gu Cao. After this game he would be given a run of matches, particularly within the 2021 Chinese FA Cup where he played a vital rule in guiding the club to a semi-finals position where they were defeated by Shandong Taishan over two legs.

== Career statistics ==
As of 31 December 2025.

Club	Season	League			Cup		Continental		Other		Total	
Club	Season	Division	Apps	Goals	Apps	Goals	Apps	Goals	Apps	Goals	Apps	Goals
Henan Songshan Longmen/ Henan FC	2021	Chinese Super League	4	0	5	0	–		–		9	0
Henan Songshan Longmen/ Henan FC	2022	Chinese Super League	12	0	1	0	–		–		13	0
Henan Songshan Longmen/ Henan FC	2023	Chinese Super League	7	0	2	0	–		–		9	0
Henan Songshan Longmen/ Henan FC	2025	Chinese Super League	0	0	0	0	–		–		0	0
Henan Songshan Longmen/ Henan FC	Total		23	0	8	0	0	0	0	0	31	0
Nanjing City (loan)	2024	China League One	28	4	4	0	–		–		28	4
Dingnan United (loan)	2025	China League One	17	0	0	0	–		–		17	0
Career total			68	4	12	0	0	0	0	0	80	4
