= Zhang Hui (footballer, born 1997) =

Chinese footballer

Zhang Hui 张慧
Personal information
- Date of birth: 18 February 1997 (age 29)
- Place of birth: Dalian, Liaoning, China
- Height: 1.85 m (6 ft 1 in)
- Position: Forward

Team information
- Current team: Ganzhou Ruishi
- Number: 13

Youth career
- Dalian Aerbin

Senior career*
Years	Team	Apps	(Gls)
2015–2020	Dalian Professional	3	(0)
2017	→ Shaanxi Chang'an Athletic (loan)	8	(1)
2021	Sichuan Minzu	17	(0)
2022	Zhuhai Qin'ao	14	(2)
2023	Dandong Tengyue	15	(2)
2025	Guangxi Pingguo	7	(0)
2025-	Ganzhou Ruishi	10	(0)
- * Club domestic league appearances and goals as of 31 December 2022

Zhang Hui (Chinese: 张慧; pinyin: Zhāng Huì; born 18 February 1997) is a Chinese footballer who currently plays for China League One side Ganzhou Ruishi.

== Club career ==
Zhang Hui was promoted to China League One side Dalian Aerbin's (later known as Dalian Pro) first team squad in the 2015 season. On 12 April 2016, he made his senior debut after the club changed their name into Dalian Yifang in a 2016 Chinese FA Cup match against Baoding Yingli ETS. He scored the opener of the match, which ensured Dalian Yifang's 2–0 away win. On 4 September 2016, he made his league debut in a 3–1 away defeat to Beijing Renhe, coming on as a substitute for Shan Pengfei in the 81st minute.

In March 2017, Zhang was loaned to China League Two side Shaanxi Chang'an Athletic for the 2017 season. On 25 March 2017, he made his debut for the club in a 1–0 win against amateur club Heilongjiang Tianfeng. He scored his first and only goal of the season on 8 April 2017 in the season's opening match which Shaanxi beat Shenyang Dongjin 2–0.

Zhang returned to Dalian Yifang who newly promoted back to the Chinese Super League in 2018. On 24 April 2018, he made his return debut in a 4–1 away win over Liaoning FC in the 2018 Chinese FA Cup, coming on for Zhao Xuebin in the 62nd minute and scoring the fourth goal for Dalian in the 81st minute. On 2 May 2018, he played in another FA Cup match against Chongqing Dangdai Lifan with a 1–0 away win.

With the introduction of Rafael Benítez as the new Head coach of Dalian, Zhang would lose his position at Dalian Yifang in the 2019 league season. On 5 May 2021, he transferred to third tier club Sichuan Minzu for the 2021 China League Two campaign.

== Career statistics ==
As of 31 December 2022.

Appearances and goals by club, season and competition
Club	Season	League			National Cup		Continental		Other		Total	
Club	Season	Division	Apps	Goals	Apps	Goals	Apps	Goals	Apps	Goals	Apps	Goals
Dalian Yifang / Dalian Professional	2015	China League One	0	0	0	0	-		-		0	0
Dalian Yifang / Dalian Professional	2016	China League One	1	0	1	1	-		-		2	1
Dalian Yifang / Dalian Professional	2018	Chinese Super League	0	0	2	1	-		-		2	1
Dalian Yifang / Dalian Professional	2019	Chinese Super League	2	0	0	0	-		-		2	0
Dalian Yifang / Dalian Professional	2020	Chinese Super League	0	0	0	0	-		-		0	0
Dalian Yifang / Dalian Professional	Total		3	0	3	2	0	0	0	0	6	2
Shaanxi Chang'an Athletic (loan)	2017	China League Two	8	1	2	0	-		-		10	1
Sichuan Minzu	2021	China League Two	17	0	3	2	-		-		20	2
Zhuhai Qin'ao	2022	China League Two	14	2	-		-		-		14	2
Career total			42	3	8	4	0	0	0	0	50	7
