= Ning Weichen =

Chinese footballer (born 1996)

Personal information
- Date of birth: 18 March 1996 (age 30)
- Place of birth: Shenyang, Liaoning, China
- Height: 1.85 m (6 ft 1 in)
- Position: Forward

Team information
- Current team: Guangxi Hengchen
- Number: 16

Youth career
- Shenyang Dongjin
- 2014–2015: Mafra
- 2015–2016: Loures

Senior career*
Years	Team	Apps	(Gls)
2016–2017	Cova da Piedade	2	(0)
2017	→ Tourizense (loan)	3	(0)
2017–2021	Beijing Guoan	1	(0)
2021	Xi'an Wolves	15	(0)
2022	Zhuhai Qin'ao	14	(1)
2023	Xi'an Chongde Ronghai		
2025–	Guangxi Hengchen	19	(2)

International career
2016	China U19	3	(0)
- * Club domestic league appearances and goals as of 17:14, 15 October 2024 (UTC)

Ning Weichen (Chinese: 宁伟辰; born 18 March 1996) is a Chinese footballer who plays as a forward for Guangxi Hengchen

== Club career ==
=== Early career ===
Born in Shenyang in the Chinese province of Liaoning, Ning began his career with Shenyang Dongjin, before being approached by scouts from Portugal, and moved to the country in April 2014. Having initially played for Mafra, he moved to Loures after a year, where he suffered a muscle tear to his right thigh, keeping him out for six months. Ning signed for Cova da Piedade in August 2016, going on to make his debut three month later in a 2–1 loss to Famalicão. Following a short loan to Tourizense, where he made three appearances, Ning was released by Cova da Piedade.

=== Beijing Guoan ===
He met Li Ming while playing for the Chinese under-19 side against the youth side of Dutch club ADO Den Haag, where Li was coaching, and on returning to China, he joined Chinese Super League club Beijing Guoan, where Li was now general manager, in July 2017. He was initially assigned to the club's reserve team, and upon making his debut he stated his intention to play for the first team.

He made just one appearance for Beijing Guoan, coming on as a late substitute for Jin Taiyan in a 1–0 loss to Jiangsu Suning at the end of the 2017 season, but was relegated to the reserve team the following year. So little was his impact on the team over the next two seasons, news website Sohu described a moment where his shot broke a goalframe at a training camp in Portugal as one of his highlights with the club.

=== Later career ===
Ning played for the Xi'an Wolves in the 2021 season, and scored his first goal in professional football for the club in the Chinese FA Cup against Hebei Kungfu in August 2021. He joined fellow China League Two side Zhuhai Qin'ao in 2022, after the dissolution of Xi'an Wolves, scoring only his second goal in senior football in July 2022, in a 2–1 win against Jiangxi Dark Horse Junior.

For the 2023 season he dropped down to the Chinese Champions League to join Xi'an Chongde Ronghai. He remained in the Chinese Champions League the following year with Zibo Home, a move seen as a disappointment by media in China, given his early promise.

== Age fraud ==
During his time with Beijing Guoan, Ning changed his year of birth from 1996 to 1997, in order to potentially be called up to the China Olympic Team for the 2020 AFC U-23 Championship. As he rectified the change quickly, he was not punished by the Chinese Football Association.

== Career statistics ==
=== Club ===
As of 15 October 2024.

Appearances and goals by club, season and competition
Club	Season	League			Cup		Other		Total	
Club	Season	Division	Apps	Goals	Apps	Goals	Apps	Goals	Apps	Goals
Cova da Piedade	2016–17	LigaPro	2	0	0	0	0	0	2	0
Tourizense (loan)	2016–17	Campeonato de Portugal	3	0	0	0	0	0	3	0
Beijing Guoan	2017	Chinese Super League	1	0	0	0	0	0	1	0
Beijing Guoan	2018	Chinese Super League	0	0	0	0	0	0	0	0
Beijing Guoan	2019	Chinese Super League	0	0	0	0	0	0	0	0
Beijing Guoan	2020	Chinese Super League	0	0	0	0	0	0	0	0
Beijing Guoan	Total		1	0	0	0	0	0	1	0
Xi'an Wolves	2021	China League Two	15	0	3 (Note: Appearances in the Chinese FA Cup)	1	0	0	18	1
Zhuhai Qin'ao	2022	China League Two	14	1	0	0	0	0	14	1
Xi'an Chongde Ronghai	2023	Chinese Champions League	–		1	0	0	0	1	0
Qibo Home	2024	Chinese Champions League	12	0	0	0	0	0	12	0
Career total			20	0	3	0	1	0	24	0
