= 2022 China League Two =

2022 season of second division Chinese association football

China League Two
- Season: 2022
- Dates: 2 July – 13 November 2022
- Champions: Jinan Xingzhou
- Promoted: Jinan Xingzhou; Dandong Tengyue; Yanbian Longding; Dongguan United; Wuxi Wugou
- Relegated: Inner Mongolia Caoshangfei
- Matches: 135
- Goals: 308 (2.28 per match)
- Top goalscorer: Ma Dongliang; Cheng Xin; Gong Zheng (8 goals)
- Biggest home win: Jinan Xingzhou 4–0 Yanbian Longding (15 July 2022)
- Biggest away win: Hunan Billows 0–6 Nantong Haimen Codion (31 July 2022)
- Highest scoring: Shaoxing Shangyu Pterosaur 2–4 Dandong Tengyue (6 July 2022); Hunan Billows 1–5 Wuhan Jiangcheng (15 July 2022); Shaoxing Shangyu Pterosaur 1–5 Wuxi Wugou (20 July 2022); Hunan Billows 0–6 Wuhan Jiangcheng (31 July 2022); Zibo Qisheng 4–2 Hunan Billows (30 October 2022)
- Longest winning run: 5 matches Jinan Xingzhou; Tai'an Tiankuang
- Longest unbeaten run: 10 matches Wuxi Wugou
- Longest winless run: 10 matches Inner Mongolia Caoshangfei; Qingdao Red Lions
- Longest losing run: 9 matches Hunan Billows

The 2022 Chinese Football Association Division Two League season was the 33rd season since its establishment in 1989. This season, the league had 18 teams, with expansion to 20 teams from 2023.

== Format ==
=== Groups ===
Team	2021 season	Order	No.	Group
Dongguan United	8th	1	A1	A
Jiangxi Dark Horse Junior	16th	6	A2	A
Inner Mongolia Caoshangfei	19th	7	A3	A
Tai'an Tiankuang	CMCL, 3rd	12	A4	A
Hainan Star	CMCL, 4th	13	A5	A
Zhuhai Qin'ao	CMCL, 8th	18	A6	A
Wuxi Wugou	9th	2	B1	B
Hunan Billows	15th	5	B2	B
Dandong Tengyue	20th	8	B3	B
Nantong Haimen Codion	CMCL, 2nd	11	B4	B
Wuhan Jiangcheng	CMCL, 5th	14	B5	B
Shaoxing Shangyu Pterosaur	CMCL, 7th	17	B6	B
Yanbian Longding	12th	3	C1	C
Hubei Istar	13th	4	C2	C
Qingdao Red Lions	21st	9	C3	C
Jinan Xingzhou	CMCL, 1st	10	C4	C
Quanzhou Yassin	23rd	15	C5	C
Zibo Qisheng	CMCL, 6th	16	C6	C

=== Centralised venues ===
- Qiannan (Groups A and F)
  - Duyun International Football Town Field No.7
  - Duyun International Football Town Field No.12
  - Qiannan Nationwide Fitness Centre Stadium
- Yancheng (Groups B and D)
  - Dafeng Olympic Sports Centre
  - Yancheng Yufeng Football Training Base Field No.1
  - Yancheng Yufeng Football Training Base Field No.2
  - Yancheng Yufeng Football Training Base Field No.3
- Dalian (Groups C and E)
  - Dalian Youth Football Training Base Field No.9
  - Dalian Youth Football Training Base Field No.10
  - Puwan Stadium Outer Field

== Clubs ==
=== Club changes ===
==== To League Two ====
Teams promoted from 2021 Chinese Champions League

- Jinan Xingzhou
- Jiangsu Zhongnan Codion
- Tai'an Huawei
- Lingshui Dingli Jingcheng
- Hubei Huachuang
- Zibo Qisheng
- Shaoxing Shangyu Pterosaur
- Zhuhai Qin'ao

==== From League Two ====
Teams promoted to 2022 China League One

- Qingdao Hainiu
- Hebei Kungfu
- Guangxi Pingguo Haliao
- Qingdao Youth Island
- Shanghai Jiading Huilong

Dissolved entries

- ~~Sichuan Minzu~~
- ~~Xiamen Egret Island~~
- ~~Shanxi Longjin~~
- ~~Hebei Zhuoao~~
- ~~Xi'an Wolves~~
- ~~Kunming Zheng He Shipman~~

==== Name changes ====
- Tai'an Huawei F.C. changed their name to Tai'an Tiankuang in February 2022.
- Jiangsu Zhongnan Codion F.C. changed their name to Nantong Haimen Codion in March 2022.
- Lingshui Dingli Jingcheng F.C. changed their name to Hainan Star in March 2022.
- Hubei Huachuang F.C. changed their name to Wuhan Jiangcheng in March 2022.
- Yichun Grand Tiger F.C. changed their name to Jiangxi Dark Horse Junior in April 2022.

=== Clubs information ===
Team	Head coach	City	Stadium	Capacity	2021 season
Dongguan United	(China) Wang Hongwei	Dongguan			8th
Wuxi Wugou	(China) Wei Xin	Wuxi			9th
Yanbian Longding	(China) Bai Shenghu	Longjing			12th
Hubei Istar	(China) Gao Feng	Wuhan	Xiaogan Sports Centre Stadium	27,000	13th
Hunan Billows	(China) Teng Renjun	Changsha	Yiyang Olympic Sports Park Stadium	30,000	15th
Jiangxi Dark Horse Junior	(China) Jiang Chen	Yichun			16th
Inner Mongolia Caoshangfei	(China) Wang Dong	Baotou	Baotou Olympic Sports Centre Stadium	40,545	19th
Dandong Tengyue	(China) Wang Dan	Dandong	Zhuanghe Liaoning Normal University Haihua College Stadium	1,000	20th
Qingdao Red Lions	(China) Li Yinan	Laixi	Laixi Sports Center	12,000	21st (Relegation play-offs winner)
Jinan Xingzhou ^{P}	(China) Tang Jing	Jinan			CMCL, 1st
Nantong Haimen Codion ^{P}	(China) Lu Qiang	Nantong			CMCL, 2nd
Tai'an Tiankuang ^{P}	(China) Liu Jindong	Tai'an			CMCL, 3rd
Hainan Star ^{P}	(Japan) Tsutomu Takahata	Lingshui			CMCL, 4th
Wuhan Jiangcheng ^{P}	(China) Wei Dayong	Wuhan			CMCL, 5th (Promotion play-offs winner)
Quanzhou Yassin	(China) Gao Daming	Quanzhou			23rd
Zibo Qisheng ^{P}	(China) Li Yangyang	Zibo			CMCL, 6th
Shaoxing Shangyu Pterosaur ^{P}	(Bulgaria) Zoran Janković	Shaoxing			CMCL, 7th
Zhuhai Qin'ao ^{P}	(China) Wang Xiao	Zhuhai			CMCL, 8th

=== Clubs Locations ===
Location of teams in 2022 China League Two

== First stage ==
=== Group A ===
==== League table ====
Pos	Team	Pld	W	D	L	GF	GA	GD	Pts	Qualification
1	Tai'an Tiankuang	10	7	1	2	16	7	+9	22	Qualification for Promotion stage
2	Dongguan United	10	7	1	2	12	4	+8	22	Qualification for Promotion stage
3	Zhuhai Qin'ao	10	4	2	4	7	7	0	14	Qualification for Relegation stage
4	Jiangxi Dark Horse Junior	10	3	2	5	10	14	−4	11	Qualification for Relegation stage
5	Hainan Star	10	3	2	5	10	17	−7	11	Qualification for Relegation stage
6	Inner Mongolia Caoshangfei	10	0	4	6	5	11	−6	4	Qualification for Relegation stage

Source: Soccerway
Rules for classification:
- During season: 1) Points; 2) Goal difference; 3) Goals scored
- After season: 1) Points; 2) Head-to-head points; 3) Head-to-head goal difference; 4) Head-to-head goals scored; 5) Goal difference; 6) Goals scored; 7) Disciplinary points (1 point for each yellow card, 3 points for each red card); 8) Draw

==== Results ====
Home \ Away	DGU	HNS	IMC	JXJ	TAT	ZHQ
Dongguan United	—	3–0	1–0	1–2	1–0	1–0
Hainan Star	1–1	—	2–2	2–3	1–2	1–0
Inner Mongolia Caoshangfei	0–1	0–1	—	0–0	1–2	0–1
Jiangxi Dark Horse Junior	0–1	0–1	1–1	—	2–1	1–2
Tai'an Tiankuang	1–0	4–1	1–0	4–1	—	0–0
Zhuhai Qin'ao	0–2	2–0	1–1	1–0	0–1	—

Source: Soccerway
Legend: Blue = home team win; Yellow = draw; Red = away team win.
For upcoming matches, an "a" indicates there is an article about the rivalry between the two participants.

==== Positions by round ====
To preserve chronological evolvements, any postponed matches are not included to the round at which they were originally scheduled, but added to the full round they were played immediately afterwards. For example, if a match is scheduled for round 7, but then played between rounds 8 and 9, it will be added to the standings for round 8.

Team ╲ Round	1	2	3	4	5	6	7	8	9	10
Tai'an Tiankuang	3	2	2	3	2	2	2	1	1	1
Dongguan United	1	1	1	1	1	1	1	2	2	2
Zhuhai Qin'ao	4	6	3	2	3	3	3	4	3	3
Jiangxi Dark Horse Junior	6	5	6	5	6	5	5	5	5	4
Hainan Star	2	3	4	4	4	4	4	3	4	5
Inner Mongolia Caoshangfei	5	4	5	6	5	6	6	6	6	6

Qualification for Promotion stage
Qualification for Relegation stage

Source: Soccerway

==== Results by match played ====
Team ╲ Round	1	2	3	4	5	6	7	8	9	10
Dongguan United	W	W	W	W	D	W	W	L	L	W
Hainan Star	W	L	L	W	D	L	L	W	D	L
Inner Mongolia Caoshangfei	L	D	L	L	D	L	D	L	D	L
Jiangxi Dark Horse Junior	L	D	L	L	L	W	D	W	L	W
Tai'an Tiankuang	D	W	W	L	W	W	W	W	W	L
Zhuhai Qin'ao	D	L	W	W	D	L	L	L	W	W

Source: Soccerway
W = Win; D = Draw; L = Loss

=== Group B ===
==== League table ====
Pos	Team	Pld	W	D	L	GF	GA	GD	Pts	Qualification
1	Wuxi Wugou (Note: Chinese Football Association awarded Dandong Tengyue, Wuhan Jiangcheng and Wuxi Wugou each a 3–0 win against Hunan Billows after Hunan Billows failed to name enough players to compete. Hunan Billows have 3 points deducted due to unpaid salaries.)	10	7	3	0	20	6	+14	24	Qualification for Promotion stage
2	Dandong Tengyue	10	6	1	3	14	9	+5	19	Qualification for Promotion stage
3	Nantong Haimen Codion	10	5	3	2	20	8	+12	18	Qualification for Relegation stage
4	Wuhan Jiangcheng	10	4	2	4	16	11	+5	14	Qualification for Relegation stage
5	Shaoxing Shangyu Pterosaur	10	2	1	7	12	23	−11	7	Qualification for Relegation stage
6	Hunan Billows	10	1	0	9	5	30	−25	0	Qualification for Relegation stage

Source: Soccerway
Rules for classification:
- During season: 1) Points; 2) Goal difference; 3) Goals scored
- After season: 1) Points; 2) Head-to-head points; 3) Head-to-head goal difference; 4) Head-to-head goals scored; 5) Goal difference; 6) Goals scored; 7) Disciplinary points (1 point for each yellow card, 3 points for each red card); 8) Draw
  Notes:

==== Results ====
Home \ Away	DDT	HNB	NHC	SSP	WHJ	WXW
Dandong Tengyue	—	2–1	0–2	2–1	0–1	0–0
Hunan Billows	0–3	—	0–6	2–0	1–5	1–3
Nantong Haimen Codion	0–1	2–0	—	2–2	3–0	1–1
Shaoxing Shangyu Pterosaur	2–4	3–0	1–3	—	1–4	1–5
Wuhan Jiangcheng	0–1	3–0	1–1	0–1	—	1–1
Wuxi Wugou	2–1	3–0	2–0	1–0	2–1	—

Source: Soccerway
Legend: Blue = home team win; Yellow = draw; Red = away team win.
For upcoming matches, an "a" indicates there is an article about the rivalry between the two participants.
- Chinese Football Association awarded Dandong Tengyue, Wuhan Jiangcheng and Wuxi Wugou each a 3–0 win against Hunan Billows after Hunan Billows failed to name enough players to compete. These matches were not played.

==== Positions by round ====
To preserve chronological evolvements, any postponed matches are not included to the round at which they were originally scheduled, but added to the full round they were played immediately afterwards. For example, if a match is scheduled for round 7, but then played between rounds 8 and 9, it will be added to the standings for round 8.

Team ╲ Round	1	2	3	4	5	6	7	8	9	10
Wuxi Wugou	2	1	1	1	1	1	1	1	1	1
Dandong Tengyue	4	3	4	5	4	3	3	2	2	2
Nantong Haimen Codion	5	5	2	3	3	2	2	3	3	3
Wuhan Jiangcheng	3	2	3	2	2	4	4	4	4	4
Shaoxing Shangyu Pterosaur	6	6	6	4	5	5	5	5	5	5
Hunan Billows	1	4	5	6	6	6	6	6	6	6

Qualification for Promotion stage
Qualification for Relegation stage

Source: Soccerway
- Chinese Football Association awarded Dandong Tengyue, Wuhan Jiangcheng and Wuxi Wugou each a 3–0 win against Hunan Billows after Hunan Billows failed to name enough players to compete. These matches were not played and they were originally scheduled to be played in rounds 8, 9 and 10 respectively.

==== Results by match played ====
Team ╲ Round	1	2	3	4	5	6	7	8	9	10
Dandong Tengyue	L	W	L	L	W	W	W	W	D	W
Hunan Billows	W	L	L	L	L	L	L	L	L	L
Nantong Haimen Codion	L	W	W	D	D	D	W	L	W	W
Shaoxing Shangyu Pterosaur	L	L	W	D	L	W	L	L	L	L
Wuhan Jiangcheng	W	D	L	W	D	L	L	W	W	L
Wuxi Wugou	W	D	W	W	W	D	W	W	D	W

Source: Soccerway
W = Win; D = Draw; L = Loss
- Chinese Football Association awarded Dandong Tengyue, Wuhan Jiangcheng and Wuxi Wugou each a 3–0 win against Hunan Billows after Hunan Billows failed to name enough players to compete. These matches were not played and they were originally scheduled to be played in rounds 8, 9 and 10 respectively.

=== Group C ===
==== League table ====
Pos	Team	Pld	W	D	L	GF	GA	GD	Pts	Qualification
1	Jinan Xingzhou	10	8	1	1	20	7	+13	25	Qualification for Promotion stage
2	Yanbian Longding	10	6	1	3	13	11	+2	19	Qualification for Promotion stage
3	Quanzhou Yassin	10	4	3	3	11	9	+2	15	Qualification for Relegation stage
4	Hubei Istar	10	4	1	5	7	9	−2	13	Qualification for Relegation stage
5	Zibo Qisheng	10	1	5	4	8	10	−2	8	Qualification for Relegation stage
6	Qingdao Red Lions	10	0	3	7	4	17	−13	3	Qualification for Relegation stage

Source: Soccerway
Rules for classification:
- During season: 1) Points; 2) Goal difference; 3) Goals scored
- After season: 1) Points; 2) Head-to-head points; 3) Head-to-head goal difference; 4) Head-to-head goals scored; 5) Goal difference; 6) Goals scored; 7) Disciplinary points (1 point for each yellow card, 3 points for each red card); 8) Draw

==== Results ====
Home \ Away	HBI	JNX	QRL	QZY	YBL	ZBQ
Hubei Istar	—	0–1	1–0	0–1	0–1	1–0
Jinan Xingzhou	2–0	—	3–1	2–1	4–0	2–1
Qingdao Red Lions	1–1	0–2	—	0–2	0–2	0–0
Quanzhou Yassin	1–0	1–2	3–1	—	0–2	0–0
Yanbian Longding	1–2	1–0	3–1	1–1	—	0–3
Zibo Qisheng	1–2	2–2	0–0	1–1	0–2	—

Source: Soccerway
Legend: Blue = home team win; Yellow = draw; Red = away team win.
For upcoming matches, an "a" indicates there is an article about the rivalry between the two participants.

==== Positions by round ====
To preserve chronological evolvements, any postponed matches are not included to the round at which they were originally scheduled, but added to the full round they were played immediately afterwards. For example, if a match is scheduled for round 7, but then played between rounds 8 and 9, it will be added to the standings for round 8.

Team ╲ Round	1	2	3	4	5	6	7	8	9	10
Jinan Xingzhou	1	1	1	1	1	1	1	1	1	1
Yanbian Longding	4	2	2	2	3	2	3	2	2	2
Quanzhou Yassin	3	4	3	3	2	3	4	3	4	3
Hubei Istar	2	3	4	4	5	4	2	4	3	4
Zibo Qisheng	5	5	5	5	4	5	5	5	5	5
Qingdao Red Lions	6	6	6	6	6	6	6	6	6	6

Qualification for Promotion stage
Qualification for Relegation stage

Source: Soccerway

==== Results by match played ====
Team ╲ Round	1	2	3	4	5	6	7	8	9	10
Hubei Istar	W	L	L	D	L	W	W	L	W	L
Jinan Xingzhou	W	W	D	W	W	W	W	W	L	W
Qingdao Red Lions	L	D	L	D	L	L	D	L	L	L
Quanzhou Yassin	D	L	W	D	W	L	L	W	D	W
Yanbian Longding	D	W	W	L	L	W	L	W	W	W
Zibo Qisheng	L	D	D	D	W	L	D	L	D	L

Source: Soccerway
W = Win; D = Draw; L = Loss

== Promotion stage ==
=== Group D ===
==== League table ====
Pos	Team	Pld	W	D	L	GF	GA	GD	Pts	Promotion
1	Jinan Xingzhou (C, P)	5	4	1	0	9	2	+7	13	Promotion to League One
2	Dandong Tengyue (P)	5	2	2	1	2	1	+1	8	Promotion to League One
3	Yanbian Longding (P)	5	2	2	1	4	4	0	8	Promotion to League One
4	Dongguan United (P)	5	2	1	2	4	4	0	7	Promotion to League One
5	Wuxi Wugou (P)	5	1	1	3	5	7	−2	4	Promotion to League One
6	Tai'an Tiankuang	5	0	1	4	1	7	−6	1	

Source: Soccerway
Rules for classification:
- During season: 1) Points; 2) Goal difference; 3) Goals scored
- After season: 1) Points; 2) Head-to-head points; 3) Head-to-head goal difference; 4) Head-to-head goals scored; 5) Goal difference; 6) Goals scored; 7) Disciplinary points (1 point for each yellow card, 3 points for each red card); 8) Draw
  (C) Champions; (P) Promoted

==== Results ====
Home \ Away	DDT	DGU	JNX	TAT	WXW	YBL
Dandong Tengyue				1–0		0–0
Dongguan United	0–0					0–2
Jinan Xingzhou	1–0	1–0			3–1	
Tai'an Tiankuang		0–2	0–0			0–1
Wuxi Wugou	0–1	1–2		3–1		
Yanbian Longding			1–4		0–0	

Source: Soccerway
Legend: Blue = home team win; Yellow = draw; Red = away team win.
For upcoming matches, an "a" indicates there is an article about the rivalry between the two participants.

==== Positions by round ====
To preserve chronological evolvements, any postponed matches are not included to the round at which they were originally scheduled, but added to the full round they were played immediately afterwards. For example, if a match is scheduled for round 3, but then played between rounds 4 and 5, it will be added to the standings for round 4.

Team ╲ Round	1	2	3	4	5
Jinan Xingzhou	3	2	2	1	1
Dandong Tengyue	2	3	3	2	2
Yanbian Longding	1	1	1	3	3
Dongguan United	6	4	4	5	4
Wuxi Wugou	5	6	5	4	5
Tai'an Tiankuang	4	5	6	6	6

Promotion to League One

Source: Soccerway

==== Results by match played ====
Team ╲ Round	1	2	3	4	5
Dandong Tengyue	W	L	W	D	D
Dongguan United	L	W	L	D	W
Jinan Xingzhou	D	W	W	W	W
Tai'an Tiankuang	D	L	L	L	L
Wuxi Wugou	L	L	D	W	L
Yanbian Longding	W	W	D	L	D

Source: Soccerway
W = Win; D = Draw; L = Loss

== Relegation stage ==
=== Group E ===
==== League table ====
Pos	Team	Pld	W	D	L	GF	GA	GD	Pts
1	Shaoxing Shangyu Pterosaur	5	3	1	1	5	3	+2	10
2	Hubei Istar	5	2	2	1	8	3	+5	8
3	Nantong Haimen Codion	5	2	2	1	8	4	+4	8
4	Wuhan Jiangcheng	5	2	1	2	6	6	0	7
5	Zibo Qisheng	5	1	1	3	5	9	−4	4
6	Hunan Billows	5	1	1	3	5	12	−7	4

Source: Soccerway
Rules for classification:
- During season: 1) Points; 2) Goal difference; 3) Goals scored
- After season: 1) Points; 2) Head-to-head points; 3) Head-to-head goal difference; 4) Head-to-head goals scored; 5) Goal difference; 6) Goals scored; 7) Disciplinary points (1 point for each yellow card, 3 points for each red card); 8) Draw

==== Results ====
Home \ Away	HBI	HNB	NHC	SSP	WHJ	ZBQ
Hubei Istar		1–1		0–1		
Hunan Billows			0–3		0–3	
Nantong Haimen Codion	1–1			1–1	1–2	
Shaoxing Shangyu Pterosaur		1–2				1–0
Wuhan Jiangcheng	0–3			0–1		1–1
Zibo Qisheng	0–3	4–2	0–2			

Source: Soccerway
Legend: Blue = home team win; Yellow = draw; Red = away team win.
For upcoming matches, an "a" indicates there is an article about the rivalry between the two participants.

==== Positions by round ====
To preserve chronological evolvements, any postponed matches are not included to the round at which they were originally scheduled, but added to the full round they were played immediately afterwards. For example, if a match is scheduled for round 3, but then played between rounds 4 and 5, it will be added to the standings for round 4.

Team ╲ Round	1	2	3	4	5
Shaoxing Shangyu Pterosaur	2	3	1	1	1
Hubei Istar	3	1	2	3	2
Nantong Haimen Codion	1	2	3	2	3
Wuhan Jiangcheng	5	6	5	5	4
Zibo Qisheng	6	4	4	4	5
Hunan Billows	4	5	6	6	6

Source: Soccerway

==== Results by match played ====
Team ╲ Round	1	2	3	4	5
Hubei Istar	D	W	D	L	W
Hunan Billows	D	L	L	L	W
Nantong Haimen Codion	W	D	D	W	L
Shaoxing Shangyu Pterosaur	W	D	W	W	L
Wuhan Jiangcheng	L	L	W	D	W
Zibo Qisheng	L	W	L	D	L

Source: Soccerway
W = Win; D = Draw; L = Loss

=== Group F ===
==== League table ====
Pos	Team	Pld	W	D	L	GF	GA	GD	Pts	Relegation
1	Zhuhai Qin'ao (Note: Chinese Football Association awarded Zhuhai Qin'ao and Quanzhou Yassin each a 3–0 win against Inner Mongolia Caoshangfei after Inner Mongolia Caoshangfei failed to arrive in the centralised venues due to COVID-19 travel restrictions.) (D, R)	5	3	2	0	8	1	+7	11	Dissolved
2	Qingdao Red Lions	5	3	0	2	5	5	0	9	
3	Hainan Star	5	2	2	1	8	8	0	8	
4	Jiangxi Dark Horse Junior	5	2	1	2	6	5	+1	7	
5	Quanzhou Yassin	5	2	0	3	7	6	+1	6	
6	Inner Mongolia Caoshangfei (R)	5	0	1	4	2	11	−9	1	Relegation to CMCL

Source: Soccerway
Rules for classification:
- During season: 1) Points; 2) Goal difference; 3) Goals scored
- After season: 1) Points; 2) Head-to-head points; 3) Head-to-head goal difference; 4) Head-to-head goals scored; 5) Goal difference; 6) Goals scored; 7) Disciplinary points (1 point for each yellow card, 3 points for each red card); 8) Draw
  (D) Disqualified; (R) Relegated
  Notes:

==== Results ====
Home \ Away	HNS	IMC	JXJ	QRL	QZY	ZHQ
Hainan Star		2–2		3–2		
Inner Mongolia Caoshangfei			0–2	0–1		
Jiangxi Dark Horse Junior	1–2			0–1	3–2	
Qingdao Red Lions					1–0	0–2
Quanzhou Yassin	2–0	3–0				0–2
Zhuhai Qin'ao	1–1	3–0	0–0			

Source: Soccerway
Legend: Blue = home team win; Yellow = draw; Red = away team win.
For upcoming matches, an "a" indicates there is an article about the rivalry between the two participants.
- Chinese Football Association awarded Zhuhai Qin'ao and Quanzhou Yassin each a 3–0 win against Inner Mongolia Caoshangfei after Inner Mongolia Caoshangfei failed to arrive in the centralised venues due to COVID-19 travel restrictions. These matches were not played.

==== Positions by round ====
To preserve chronological evolvements, any postponed matches are not included to the round at which they were originally scheduled, but added to the full round they were played immediately afterwards. For example, if a match is scheduled for round 3, but then played between rounds 4 and 5, it will be added to the standings for round 4.

Team ╲ Round	1	2	3	4	5
Zhuhai Qin'ao	1	1	1	1	1
Qingdao Red Lions	4	5	5	4	2
Hainan Star	2	2	4	5	3
Jiangxi Dark Horse Junior	3	4	3	2	4
Quanzhou Yassin	5	3	2	3	5
Inner Mongolia Caoshangfei	6	6	6	6	6

Relegation to CMCL

Source: Soccerway
- Chinese Football Association awarded Zhuhai Qin'ao and Quanzhou Yassin each a 3–0 win against Inner Mongolia Caoshangfei after Inner Mongolia Caoshangfei failed to arrive in the centralised venues due to COVID-19 travel restrictions. These matches were not played and they were originally scheduled to be played in round 1 and 2 respectively.

==== Results by match played ====
Team ╲ Round	1	2	3	4	5
Hainan Star	W	D	L	D	W
Inner Mongolia Caoshangfei	L	L	L	D	L
Jiangxi Dark Horse Junior	W	L	W	D	L
Qingdao Red Lions	L	W	L	W	W
Quanzhou Yassin	L	W	W	L	L
Zhuhai Qin'ao	W	D	W	D	W

Source: Soccerway
W = Win; D = Draw; L = Loss
- Chinese Football Association awarded Zhuhai Qin'ao and Quanzhou Yassin each a 3–0 win against Inner Mongolia Caoshangfei after Inner Mongolia Caoshangfei failed to arrive in the centralised venues due to COVID-19 travel restrictions. These matches were not played and they were originally scheduled to be played in round 1 and 2 respectively.

== Goalscorers ==
As of 13 November 2022

Rank	Player	Club	Goals
1	(China) Ma Dongliang	Tai'an Tiankuang	8
1	(China) Cheng Xin	Nantong Haimen Codion	8
1	(China) Gong Zheng	Jinan Xingzhou	8
4	(China) Chen Weiqi	Wuhan Jiangcheng	7
4	(China) Zhou Bingxu	Wuxi Wugou	7
6	(China) Xu Bo	Yanbian Longding	6
6	(China) Qeyser Tursan	Dongguan United	6
8	(China) Yin Hanlong	Nantong Haimen Codion	5
8	(China) Li Biao	Hubei Istar	5
10	(China) Zhang Aokai	Jiangxi Dark Horse Junior	4
10	(China) Zhu Zhengyu	Wuxi Wugou	4
10	(China) Wu Dingmao	Nantong Haimen Codion	4
10	(China) Liu Feng	Wuhan Jiangcheng	4
10	(China) Zhu Yifan	Jinan Xingzhou	4
10	(China) Chen Zijie	Zhuhai Qin'ao	4
10	(China) Zanhar Beshathan	Dongguan United	4

=== Hat-tricks ===
Player	For	Against	Result	Date
(China) Chen Weiqi	Wuhan Jiangcheng	Hunan Billows	5-1 (A)	15 July 2022
(China) Zhou Bingxu	Wuxi Wugou	Shaoxing Shangyu Pterosaur	5-1 (A)	20 July 2022
(China) Ma Dongliang	Tai'an Tiankuang	Hainan Star	4-1 (H)	30 July 2022
