= 2021 Chinese Champions League =

Football league season

Chinese Champions League
- Season: 2021
- Dates: 12 September – 4 December
- Champions: Jinan Xingzhou
- Promoted: Jinan Xingzhou; Jiangsu Zhongnan Codion; Tai'an Huawei; Lingshui Dingli Jingcheng; Hubei Huachuang; Zibo Qisheng; Shaoxing Shangyu Pterosaur; Zhuhai Qin'ao

The 2021 Chinese Champions League, officially known as the Sino-LAC 2021 Chinese Football Association Member Association Champions League (Chinese: 中拉体育2021中国足球协会会员协会冠军联赛) for sponsorship reasons, was the 20th season since its establishment in 2002.

== Team ==
=== From Champions League ===
Teams promoted to China League Two

- Guangdong Lianghetang
- Xiamen Qudian
- Sichuan Huakun
- Yichun Jiangxi Tungsten Grand Tiger
- Hebei Jingying Zhihai
- Wuxi Xinje
- Quanzhou Addarmour
- Yanbian Hailanjiang
- Dandong Hantong

Teams relegated to CFA member associations leagues / cups or lower tiers

Other 7 teams from last season relegated to regional competitions.

=== To Champions League ===
Teams qualified from CFA member associations leagues / cups

- Xi'an FA Cup
  - Xi'an Ronghai
- Shaanxi National Super League
  - Xi'an Yilian
- Xinjiang FA Champions League
  - Xinjiang Snowland Tiancheng
  - Xinjiang Lingmengzhe
  - Xinjiang Umud
  - Kashgar Alifu
- Inner Mongolia Male Super League
  - Urad Middle Banner Hasaer
  - Dalad Banner Bohai
- Shandong Amateur Super League
  - Weifang Juexiaoya
  - Tai'an Huawei
  - Jinan Xingzhou
- Shanxi FA Super League
  - Shanxi Longchengren
- Tianjin FA Super League
  - Tianjin Shengde
  - Tianjin Yiteng Haitian Xinmei Zhicai
- Qingdao City Super League
  - Qingdao N&E United
- Jiangsu FA Championship League
  - Jiangsu Zhongnan Codion
- Guangxi Super League
  - Guangxi Lanhang
  - Guangxi Huaqiangu
  - Liuzhou Ranko
- Chongqing Amateur League Super Division
  - Chongqing Nerazzurri
  - Chongqing Dikai
- Chengdu City Super League
  - Chengdu Top Shine
- Wuhan City Super League
  - Hubei Huachuang
- Kunming Football Tournament
  - The Alliance of Guardians
- Fujian FA Super League
  - Fuzhou Hengxing
  - Fujian Quanzhou Qinggong
- Guangdong FA Super League
  - Guangdong Red Treasure
  - Zhuhai Qin'ao
  - Meixian Qiuxiang
  - Foshan Jion
- Jiangxi League
  - Nanchang Honggu
- Hainan Football Super League
  - Lingshui Dingli Jingcheng
- Zhejiang Super League Division A
  - Shaoxing Shangyu Pterosaur
- Shanghai FA Super League Group A
  - Shanghai Huajiao
  - Shanghai Mitsubishi Heavy Industries Flying Lion
  - Shanghai Huazheng

Teams qualified by recommendations

- Ningxia FA
  - Ningxiaren Haixi
- Gansu FA
  - Jingchuan Wenhui
  - Lanzhou Taifeng
- Henan FA
  - Henan Orient Classic
  - Henan Baier
- Hebei FA
  - Langfang Fenghua
- Liaoning FA
  - Liaoning Leading
  - Yingkou Chaoyue
  - Anshan Feiyang
- Changchun FA
  - Changchun Shenhua
- Yanbian FA
  - Yanbian Sports School
- Nanjing FA
  - Nanjing Tehu
- Yunnan FA
  - Yunnan Yukun Steel
  - Lijiang Yuanheng
- Sichuan FA
  - Sichuan Tianfu
- Hubei FA
  - Hubei Wuhan Athletics Zaiming
- Hunan FA
  - Hunan X-Ray
- Xinjiang PCC FA
  - Xinjiang Alar 359
- Anhui FA
  - Anhui Litian
  - Anhui OneCity

=== Name Changes ===
Beijing City United F.C. moved to Zhuhai and changed their name to Zhuhai Qin'ao in January 2021.

Shanxi Zhisheng F.C. changed their name to Shanxi Longchengren in February 2021.

Dalian X-Ray F.C. moved to Loudi and changed their name to Hunan X-Ray in March 2021.

Meixian 433 F.C. changed their name to Meixian Qiuxiang in March 2021.

Sichuan Top Shine F.C. changed their name to Chengdu Top Shine in March 2021.

Tongyong Group F.C. changed their name to Guangdong Red Treasure in March 2021.

Weifang Juexiaoya F.C. moved to Zibo and changed their name to Zibo Qisheng in March 2021.

Xinjiang Xingdong Weilai F.C. changed their name to Xinjiang Lingmengzhe in March 2021.

Nanchang Teneng F.C. changed their name to Nanchang Honggu in June 2021.

Jingchuan Zhenpin F.C. changed their name to Jingchuan Wenhui in August 2021.

Urad Middle Banner Hasaer F.C. moved to Hohhot and changed their name to Inner Mongolia Hasaer in September 2021.

== Qualified teams ==
Team	City	Football association	Qualificated competition	Season	Position	Head coach
Anhui Litian	Hefei	Anhui FA	recommendation	–	–	Li Dong
Anhui OneCity	Bengbu	Anhui FA	recommendation	–	–	Zheng Xianglong
Anshan Feiyang	Anshan	Liaoning FA	recommendation	–	–	Xia Mingyang
Changchun Shenhua	Changchun	Changchun FA	recommendation	–	–	Liu Cheng
Chengdu Top Shine	Chengdu	Chengdu FA	Chengdu City Super League	2020	1st	Li Sheng
Chongqing Dikai	Chongqing	Chongqing FA	Chongqing Amateur League Super Division	2020	6th	Xu Ran
Chongqing Nerazzurri	Chongqing	Chongqing FA	Chongqing Amateur League Super Division	2020	4th	Ding Bo
Dalad Banner Bohai	Dalad Banner	Inner Mongolia FA	Inner Mongolia Male Super League	2019–20	2nd	Bai Xianfeng
Foshan Jion	Foshan	Guangdong FA	Guangdong FA Super League	2021	6th	Chen Weisheng
Fujian Quanzhou Qinggong	Quanzhou	Fujian FA	Fujian FA Super League	2020	3rd	Zhao Wanli
Fuzhou Hengxing	Fuzhou	Fujian FA	Fujian FA Super League	2020	1st	Fan Wenlong
Guangdong Red Treasure	Guangzhou	Guangdong FA	Guangdong FA Super League	2021	1st	Wang Yuhong
Guangxi Huaqiangu	Hezhou	Guangxi FA	Guangxi Super League	2021	2nd	Zhao Ding
Guangxi Lanhang	Laibin	Guangxi FA	Guangxi Super League	2021	1st	(South Korea) Cheon Min-chul
Henan Baier	Zhengzhou	Henan FA	recommendation	–	–	(Japan) Kenji Kazuhiro
Henan Orient Classic	Zhengzhou	Henan FA	recommendation	–	–	Liu Xiang
Hubei Huachuang	Wuhan	Wuhan FA	Wuhan City Super League	2020	1st	Wang Quan
Hubei Wuhan Athletics Zaiming	Wuhan	Hubei FA	recommendation	–	–	Zhao Peng
Hunan X-Ray	Loudi	Hunan FA	recommendation	–	–	Teng Renjun
Inner Mongolia Hasaer	Hohhot	Inner Mongolia FA	Inner Mongolia Male Super League	2019–20	1st	Xiao Zhanbo
Jiangsu Zhongnan Codion	Nantong	Jiangsu FA	Jiangsu FA Championship League	2021	1st	Gao Wanguo
Jinan Xingzhou	Jinan	Shandong FA	Shandong Amateur Super League	2020	3rd	Tang Jing
Jingchuan Wenhui	Jingchuan	Gansu FA	recommendation	–	–	(Portugal) Quim
Kashgar Alifu	Kashgar	Xinjiang FA	Xinjiang FA Champions League	2021	5th	Askar Balat
Langfang Fenghua	Langfang	Hebei FA	recommendation	–	–	Geng Xudong
Lanzhou Taifeng	Lanzhou	Gansu FA	recommendation	–	–	Wu Quan
Liaoning Leading	Benxi	Liaoning FA	recommendation	–	–	Sun Jiasen
Lijiang Yuanheng	Lijiang	Yunnan FA	recommendation	–	–	He Jianwei
Lingshui Dingli Jingcheng	Lingshui	Hainan FA	Hainan Football Super League	2020	2nd	(Japan) Tsutomu Takahata
Liuzhou Ranko	Liuzhou	Guangxi FA	Guangxi Super League	2021	3rd	Huang Yong
Meixian Qiuxiang	Meizhou	Guangdong FA	Guangdong FA Super League	2021	3rd	Huang Hongtao
Nanchang Honggu	Nanchang	Jiangxi FA	Jiangxi Football League	2020	1st	Sun Bin
Nanjing Tehu	Nanjing	Nanjing FA	recommendation	–	–	Tang Bo
Ningxiaren Haixi	Yinchuan	Ningxia FA	recommendation	–	–	Zhang Biao
Qingdao N&E United	Qingdao	Qingdao FA	Qingdao City Super League	2020	2nd	Dai Zhenpeng
Shanghai Huajiao	Shanghai	Shanghai FA	Shanghai FA Super League Group A	2020	2nd	Yang Chen
Shanghai Huazheng	Shanghai	Shanghai FA	Shanghai FA Super League Group A	2020	4th	Zhan Huimin
Shanghai Mitsubishi Heavy Industries Flying Lion	Shanghai	Shanghai FA	Shanghai FA Super League Group A	2020	3rd	Huang Yi
Shanxi Longchengren	Taiyuan	Shanxi FA	Shanxi FA Super League	2021	1st	Lu Yan
Shaoxing Shangyu Pterosaur	Shaoxing	Zhejiang FA	Zhejiang Super League Division A	2021	5th	Ding Qi
Sichuan Tianfu	Chengdu	Sichuan FA	recommendation	–	–	Liu Wentao
Tai'an Huawei	Tai'an	Shandong FA	Shandong Amateur Super League	2020	2nd	Liu Jindong
The Alliance of Guardians	Kunming	Kunming FA	Kunming Football Tournament	2020	9th	Xiao Minbao
Tianjin Shengde	Tianjin	Tianjin FA	Tianjin FA Super League	2021	5th	Qin Dong
Tianjin Yiteng Haitian Xinmei Zhicai	Tianjin	Tianjin FA	Tianjin FA Super League	2021	2nd	Song Xiaoxuan
Xi'an Ronghai	Xi'an	Xi'an FA	Xi'an FA Cup	2021	1st	Qu Tianbao
Xi'an Yilian	Xi'an	Xi'an FA	Shaanxi National Super League	2020	1st	Huang Qixiang
Xinjiang Alar 359	Aral	Xinjiang PCC FA	recommendation	–	–	(Brazil) Vando
Xinjiang Lingmengzhe	Ürümqi	Xinjiang FA	Xinjiang FA Champions League	2021	2nd	Li Bin
Xinjiang Snowland Tiancheng	Ürümqi	Xinjiang FA	Xinjiang FA Champions League	2021	1st	Abdulla Axim
Xinjiang Umud	Ürümqi	Xinjiang FA	Xinjiang FA Champions League	2021	3rd	
Yanbian Sports School	Yanji	Yanbian FA	recommendation	–	–	Bai Shenghu
Yingkou Chaoyue	Yingkou	Liaoning FA	recommendation	–	–	Ma Kai
Yunnan Yukun Steel	Yuxi	Yunnan FA	recommendation	–	–	Zhu Jiong
Zhuhai Qin'ao	Zhuhai	Guangdong FA	Guangdong FA Super League	2021	2nd	Wang Hao
Zibo Qisheng	Zibo	Shandong FA	Shandong Amateur Super League	2020	1st	Li Yangyang

== Regional Competitions ==
The draw for the regional competitions took place on 31 August 2021.

=== Group A ===
Pos	Team	Pld	W	D	L	GF	GA	GD	Pts	Qualification
1	Ningxiaren Haixi (Q)	2	1	0	1	5	2	+3	3 (Note: Head-to-head results: Ningxiaren Haixi 5–0 Henan Orient Classic, Xinjiang Lingmengzhe 2–0 Ningxiaren Haixi, Henan Orient Classic 3–2 Xinjiang Lingmengzhe.)	Qualification for Semi-finals
2	Xinjiang Lingmengzhe (Q)	2	1	0	1	4	3	+1	3	Qualification for Semi-finals
3	Henan Orient Classic	2	1	0	1	3	7	−4	3	

Rules for classification: 1) Points; 2) Head-to-head points; 3) Head-to-head goal difference; 4) Head-to-head goals scored; 5) Goal difference; 6) Goals scored; 7) Disciplinary points (yellow card = 1 point, red card as a result of two yellow cards = 3 points, direct red card = 3 points, yellow card followed by direct red card = 4 points); 8) Drawing of lots.
Notes:

22 September 2021	Henan Orient Classic	3–2	Xinjiang Lingmengzhe	Helan Mountain Stadium, Yinchuan
10:00 UTC+8				Attendance: 0 (Note: The match was played behind closed doors due to the COVID-19 pandemic.); Referee: Cui Yong

24 September 2021	Xinjiang Lingmengzhe	2–0	Ningxiaren Haixi	Helan Mountain Stadium, Yinchuan
15:30 UTC+8				Attendance: 0 Referee: Liu Xun

26 September 2021	Ningxiaren Haixi	5–0	Henan Orient Classic	Helan Mountain Stadium, Yinchuan
10:00 UTC+8				Attendance: 0 Referee: Shi Yanzhong

=== Group B ===
Pos	Team	Pld	W	D	L	GF	GA	GD	Pts	Qualification
1	Jingchuan Wenhui (Q)	2	1	1	0	2	1	+1	4	Qualification for Semi-finals
2	Xinjiang Snowland Tiancheng (Q)	2	1	0	1	3	2	+1	3	Qualification for Semi-finals
3	Dalad Banner Bohai	2	0	1	1	0	2	−2	1	

Updated to match(es) played on 24 September 2021. Source:
Rules for classification: 1) Points; 2) Head-to-head points; 3) Head-to-head goal difference; 4) Head-to-head goals scored; 5) Goal difference; 6) Goals scored; 7) Disciplinary points (yellow card = 1 point, red card as a result of two yellow cards = 3 points, direct red card = 3 points, yellow card followed by direct red card = 4 points); 8) Drawing of lots.

22 September 2021	Jingchuan Wenhui	0–0	Dalad Banner Bohai	Helan Mountain Stadium, Yinchuan
15:30 UTC+8				Attendance: 0 Referee: Liu Yang

24 September 2021	Dalad Banner Bohai	0–2	Xinjiang Snowland Tiancheng	Helan Mountain Stadium, Yinchuan
10:00 UTC+8				Attendance: 0 Referee: Cui Yong

26 September 2021	Xinjiang Snowland Tiancheng	1–2	Jingchuan Wenhui	Helan Mountain Stadium, Yinchuan
15:30 UTC+8				Attendance: 0 Referee: Yuan Shiwei

=== Group C ===
Pos	Team	Pld	W	D	L	GF	GA	GD	Pts	Qualification
1	Inner Mongolia Hasaer (Q)	2	1	1	0	6	0	+6	4 (Note: Head-to-head results: Inner Mongolia Hasaer 0–0 Xi'an Yilian. Goal difference: Inner Mongolia Hasaer +6 and Xi'an Yilian +5.)	Qualification for Semi-finals
2	Xi'an Yilian (Q)	2	1	1	0	5	0	+5	4	Qualification for Semi-finals
3	Henan Baier	2	0	0	2	0	11	−11	0	
4	Xinjiang Umud	0	0	0	0	0	0	0	0	Withdrew

Rules for classification: 1) Points; 2) Head-to-head points; 3) Head-to-head goal difference; 4) Head-to-head goals scored; 5) Goal difference; 6) Goals scored; 7) Disciplinary points (yellow card = 1 point, red card as a result of two yellow cards = 3 points, direct red card = 3 points, yellow card followed by direct red card = 4 points); 8) Drawing of lots.
Notes:

3 October 2021	Henan Baier	0–6	Inner Mongolia Hasaer	Helan Mountain Stadium Outer Field, Yinchuan
10:00 UTC+8				Attendance: 0 Referee: Ji Jiwei

5 October 2021	Inner Mongolia Hasaer	0–0	Xi'an Yilian	Helan Mountain Stadium Outer Field, Yinchuan
15:30 UTC+8				Attendance: 0 Referee: Liu Xin

7 October 2021	Xi'an Yilian	5–0	Henan Baier	Helan Mountain Stadium Outer Field, Yinchuan
10:00 UTC+8				Attendance: 0 Referee: Xie Guangqiang

=== Group D ===
Pos	Team	Pld	W	D	L	GF	GA	GD	Pts	Qualification
1	Xi'an Ronghai (Q)	3	2	1	0	11	1	+10	7 (Note: Head-to-head results: Shanxi Longchengren 1–1 Xi'an Ronghai. Goal difference: Xi'an Ronghai +10 and Shanxi Longchengren +4.)	Qualification for Semi-finals
2	Shanxi Longchengren (Q)	3	2	1	0	8	4	+4	7	Qualification for Semi-finals
3	Kashgar Alifu	3	1	0	2	5	13	−8	3	
4	Lanzhou Taifeng	3	0	0	3	2	8	−6	0	

Rules for classification: 1) Points; 2) Head-to-head points; 3) Head-to-head goal difference; 4) Head-to-head goals scored; 5) Goal difference; 6) Goals scored; 7) Disciplinary points (yellow card = 1 point, red card as a result of two yellow cards = 3 points, direct red card = 3 points, yellow card followed by direct red card = 4 points); 8) Drawing of lots.
Notes:

3 October 2021	Shanxi Longchengren	5–2	Kashgar Alifu	Helan Mountain Stadium, Yinchuan
15:30 UTC+8				Attendance: 0 Referee: Liu Yong

3 October 2021	Xi'an Ronghai	3–0	Lanzhou Taifeng	Helan Mountain Stadium Outer Field, Yinchuan
15:30 UTC+8				Attendance: 0 Referee: Niu Rui

5 October 2021	Kashgar Alifu	0–7	Xi'an Ronghai	Helan Mountain Stadium Outer Field, Yinchuan
9:30 UTC+8				Attendance: 0 Referee: Li Fan

5 October 2021	Lanzhou Taifeng	1–2	Shanxi Longchengren	Helan Mountain Stadium Outer Field, Yinchuan
12:30 UTC+8				Attendance: 0 Referee: Chen Hongwei

7 October 2021	Shanxi Longchengren	1–1	Xi'an Ronghai	Helan Mountain Stadium, Yinchuan
15:30 UTC+8				Attendance: 0 Referee: Liu Changzhi

7 October 2021	Lanzhou Taifeng	1–3	Kashgar Alifu	Helan Mountain Stadium Outer Field, Yinchuan
15:30 UTC+8				Attendance: 0 Referee: Erihe

=== Group E ===
Pos	Team	Pld	W	D	L	GF	GA	GD	Pts	Qualification
1	Jinan Xingzhou (Q, C, P）	3	3	0	0	7	1	+6	9	Qualification for Semi-finals
2	Nanjing Tehu (Q)	3	2	0	1	4	2	+2	6	Qualification for Semi-finals
3	Changchun Shenhua	3	1	0	2	2	5	−3	3	
4	Langfang Fenghua	3	0	0	3	1	6	−5	0	

Rules for classification: 1) Points; 2) Head-to-head points; 3) Head-to-head goal difference; 4) Head-to-head goals scored; 5) Goal difference; 6) Goals scored; 7) Disciplinary points (yellow card = 1 point, red card as a result of two yellow cards = 3 points, direct red card = 3 points, yellow card followed by direct red card = 4 points); 8) Drawing of lots.

12 September 2021	Jinan Xingzhou	2–1	Nanjing Tehu	Luneng Football School Field 1, Weifang
9:30 UTC+8				Attendance: 0 Referee: Lin Jun

12 September 2021	Changchun Shenhua	2–1	Langfang Fenghua	Luneng Football School Field 2, Weifang
9:30 UTC+8				Attendance: 0 Referee: Huang Xiang

14 September 2021	Nanjing Tehu	1–0	Changchun Shenhua	Luneng Football School Field 1, Weifang
15:00 UTC+8				Attendance: 0 Referee: Liu Yang

14 September 2021	Langfang Fenghua	0–2	Jinan Xingzhou	Luneng Football School Field 2, Weifang
15:00 UTC+8				Attendance: 0 Referee: Liu Xun

16 September 2021	Jinan Xingzhou	3–0	Changchun Shenhua	Luneng Football School Field 1, Weifang
9:30 UTC+8				Attendance: 0 Referee: Liu Xun

16 September 2021	Langfang Fenghua	0–2	Nanjing Tehu	Luneng Football School Field 2, Weifang
9:30 UTC+8				Attendance: 0 Referee: Huang Xiang

=== Group F ===
Pos	Team	Pld	W	D	L	GF	GA	GD	Pts	Qualification
1	Tai'an Huawei (Q, P)	3	3	0	0	6	0	+6	9	Qualification for Semi-finals
2	Tianjin Shengde (Q)	3	2	0	1	6	4	+2	6	Qualification for Semi-finals
3	Liaoning Leading	3	1	0	2	2	5	−3	3	
4	Yanbian Sports School	3	0	0	3	2	7	−5	0	

Rules for classification: 1) Points; 2) Head-to-head points; 3) Head-to-head goal difference; 4) Head-to-head goals scored; 5) Goal difference; 6) Goals scored; 7) Disciplinary points (yellow card = 1 point, red card as a result of two yellow cards = 3 points, direct red card = 3 points, yellow card followed by direct red card = 4 points); 8) Drawing of lots.

12 September 2021	Yanbian Sports School	1–3	Tianjin Shengde	Luneng Football School Field 1, Weifang
15:00 UTC+8				Attendance: 0 Referee: Liu Yang

12 September 2021	Liaoning Leading	0–1	Tai'an Huawei	Luneng Football School Field 2, Weifang
15:00 UTC+8				Attendance: 0 Referee: Liu Xun

14 September 2021	Tianjin Shengde	3–0	Liaoning Leading	Luneng Football School Field 1, Weifang
9:30 UTC+8				Attendance: 0 Referee: Pei Xiaodong

14 September 2021	Tai'an Huawei	2–0	Yanbian Sports School	Luneng Football School Field 2, Weifang
9:30 UTC+8				Attendance: 0 Referee: Xie Chenyao

16 September 2021	Yanbian Sports School	1–2	Liaoning Leading	Luneng Football School Field 1, Weifang
15:00 UTC+8				Attendance: 0 Referee: Pei Xiaodong

16 September 2021	Tai'an Huawei	3–0	Tianjin Shengde	Luneng Football School Field 2, Weifang
15:00 UTC+8				Attendance: 0 Referee: Liu Yang

=== Group G ===
Pos	Team	Pld	W	D	L	GF	GA	GD	Pts	Qualification
1	Qingdao N&E United (Q)	2	1	1	0	4	3	+1	4	Qualification for Semi-finals
2	Tianjin Yiteng Haitian Xinmei Zhicai (Q)	2	1	0	1	2	2	0	3	Qualification for Semi-finals
3	Yingkou Chaoyue	2	0	1	1	2	3	−1	1	

Rules for classification: 1) Points; 2) Head-to-head points; 3) Head-to-head goal difference; 4) Head-to-head goals scored; 5) Goal difference; 6) Goals scored; 7) Disciplinary points (yellow card = 1 point, red card as a result of two yellow cards = 3 points, direct red card = 3 points, yellow card followed by direct red card = 4 points); 8) Drawing of lots.

28 September 2021	Tianjin Yiteng Haitian Xinmei Zhicai	1–2	Qingdao N&E United	Luneng Football School Field A1, Weifang
14:30 UTC+8				Attendance: 0 Referee: Guo Shuowei

30 September 2021	Qingdao N&E United	2–2	Yingkou Chaoyue	Luneng Football School Field A3, Weifang
15:00 UTC+8				Attendance: 0 Referee: Guo Zhen

2 October 2021	Yingkou Chaoyue	0–1	Tianjin Yiteng Haitian Xinmei Zhicai	Luneng Football School Field A1, Weifang
14:30 UTC+8				Attendance: 0 Referee: Guo Xiangyu

=== Group H ===
Pos	Team	Pld	W	D	L	GF	GA	GD	Pts	Qualification
1	Jiangsu Zhongnan Codion (Q, P)	2	2	0	0	6	1	+5	6	Qualification for Semi-finals
2	Zibo Qisheng (Q, P)	2	1	0	1	6	3	+3	3	Qualification for Semi-finals
3	Anshan Feiyang	2	0	0	2	0	8	−8	0	

Rules for classification: 1) Points; 2) Head-to-head points; 3) Head-to-head goal difference; 4) Head-to-head goals scored; 5) Goal difference; 6) Goals scored; 7) Disciplinary points (yellow card = 1 point, red card as a result of two yellow cards = 3 points, direct red card = 3 points, yellow card followed by direct red card = 4 points); 8) Drawing of lots.

28 September 2021	Anshan Feiyang	0–3	Jiangsu Zhongnan Codion	Luneng Football School Field A3, Weifang
15:00 UTC+8				Attendance: 0 Referee: Ma Zhaowen

30 September 2021	Jiangsu Zhongnan Codion	3–1	Zibo Qisheng	Luneng Football School Field A1, Weifang
14:30 UTC+8				Attendance: 0 Referee: Wang Shaojie

2 October 2021	Zibo Qisheng	5–0	Anshan Feiyang	Luneng Football School Field A3, Weifang
15:00 UTC+8				Attendance: 0 Referee: Zhang Qi

=== Group I ===
Pos	Team	Pld	W	D	L	GF	GA	GD	Pts	Qualification
1	Chengdu Top Shine (Q)	3	3	0	0	12	3	+9	9	Qualification for Semi-finals
2	Hubei Huachuang (Q, P)	3	2	0	1	8	4	+4	6	Qualification for Semi-finals
3	The Alliance of Guardians	3	1	0	2	3	6	−3	3	
4	Xinjiang Alar 359	3	0	0	3	1	11	−10	0	

Rules for classification: 1) Points; 2) Head-to-head points; 3) Head-to-head goal difference; 4) Head-to-head goals scored; 5) Goal difference; 6) Goals scored; 7) Disciplinary points (yellow card = 1 point, red card as a result of two yellow cards = 3 points, direct red card = 3 points, yellow card followed by direct red card = 4 points); 8) Drawing of lots.

8 October 2021	Hubei Huachuang	3–0	The Alliance of Guardians	Guposhan Spring Football Town Field 1, Hezhou
9:30 UTC+8				Attendance: 0 Referee: Cheng Wei

8 October 2021	Xinjiang Alar 359	1–5	Chengdu Top Shine	Guposhan Spring Football Town Field 2, Hezhou
9:30 UTC+8				Attendance: 0 Referee: Cao Dongbo

10 October 2021	The Alliance of Guardians	3–0	Xinjiang Alar 359	Guposhan Spring Football Town Field 3, Hezhou
15:30 UTC+8				Attendance: 0 Referee: Zhang Cheng

10 October 2021	Chengdu Top Shine	4–2	Hubei Huachuang	Guposhan Spring Football Town Field 4, Hezhou
15:30 UTC+8				Attendance: 0 Referee: Liu Lin

12 October 2021	Hubei Huachuang	3–0	Xinjiang Alar 359	Guposhan Spring Football Town Field 1, Hezhou
9:30 UTC+8				Attendance: 0 Referee: Liu Rongyuan

12 October 2021	Chengdu Top Shine	3–0	The Alliance of Guardians	Guposhan Spring Football Town Field 2, Hezhou
9:30 UTC+8				Attendance: 0 Referee: Zhang Long

=== Group J ===
Pos	Team	Pld	W	D	L	GF	GA	GD	Pts	Qualification
1	Guangxi Lanhang (Q)	3	2	0	1	11	1	+10	6 (Note: Head-to-head results: Guangxi Lanhang 2–0 Yunnan Yukun Steel, Yunnan Yukun Steel 2–0 Hubei Wuhan Athletics Zaiming, Hubei Wuhan Athletics Zaiming 1–0 Guangxi Lanhang.)	Qualification for Semi-finals
2	Yunnan Yukun Steel (Q)	3	2	0	1	8	2	+6	6	Qualification for Semi-finals
3	Hubei Wuhan Athletics Zaiming	3	2	0	1	3	3	0	6	
4	Chongqing Nerazzurri	3	0	0	3	1	17	−16	0	

Rules for classification: 1) Points; 2) Head-to-head points; 3) Head-to-head goal difference; 4) Head-to-head goals scored; 5) Goal difference; 6) Goals scored; 7) Disciplinary points (yellow card = 1 point, red card as a result of two yellow cards = 3 points, direct red card = 3 points, yellow card followed by direct red card = 4 points); 8) Drawing of lots.
Notes:

8 October 2021	Hubei Wuhan Athletics Zaiming	2–1	Chongqing Nerazzurri	Guposhan Spring Football Town Field 3, Hezhou
15:30 UTC+8				Attendance: 0 Referee: Zheng Shenfei

8 October 2021	Guangxi Lanhang	2–0	Yunnan Yukun Steel	Guposhan Spring Football Town Field 4, Hezhou
15:30 UTC+8				Attendance: 0 Referee: Zheng Chao

10 October 2021	Chongqing Nerazzurri	0–9	Guangxi Lanhang	Guposhan Spring Football Town Field 1, Hezhou
9:30 UTC+8				Attendance: 0 Referee: Cao Rui

10 October 2021	Yunnan Yukun Steel	2–0	Hubei Wuhan Athletics Zaiming	Guposhan Spring Football Town Field 2, Hezhou
9:30 UTC+8				Attendance: 0 Referee: Wang Dongyu

12 October 2021	Hubei Wuhan Athletics Zaiming	1–0	Guangxi Lanhang	Guposhan Spring Football Town Field 3, Hezhou
15:30 UTC+8				Attendance: 0 Referee: Wang Zisheng

12 October 2021	Yunnan Yukun Steel	6–0	Chongqing Nerazzurri	Guposhan Spring Football Town Field 4, Hezhou
15:30 UTC+8				Attendance: 0 Referee: Li Tong

=== Group K ===
Pos	Team	Pld	W	D	L	GF	GA	GD	Pts	Qualification
1	Liuzhou Ranko (Q)	2	2	0	0	6	1	+5	6	Qualification for Semi-finals
2	Lijiang Yuanheng (Q)	2	1	0	1	3	4	−1	3	Qualification for Semi-finals
3	Chongqing Dikai	2	0	0	2	1	5	−4	0	

Rules for classification: 1) Points; 2) Head-to-head points; 3) Head-to-head goal difference; 4) Head-to-head goals scored; 5) Goal difference; 6) Goals scored; 7) Disciplinary points (yellow card = 1 point, red card as a result of two yellow cards = 3 points, direct red card = 3 points, yellow card followed by direct red card = 4 points); 8) Drawing of lots.

19 October 2021	Chongqing Dikai	1–2	Lijiang Yuanheng	Guposhan Spring Football Town Field 1, Hezhou
15:00 UTC+8				Attendance: 0 Referee: Chen Sijian

21 October 2021	Lijiang Yuanheng	1–3	Liuzhou Ranko	Guposhan Spring Football Town Field 2, Hezhou
14:30 UTC+8				Attendance: 0 Referee: Wang Pengwei

23 October 2021	Liuzhou Ranko	3–0	Chongqing Dikai	Guposhan Spring Football Town Field 1, Hezhou
14:30 UTC+8				Attendance: 0 Referee: Xue Xiangsheng

=== Group L ===
Pos	Team	Pld	W	D	L	GF	GA	GD	Pts	Qualification
1	Sichuan Tianfu (Q)	2	1	1	0	5	4	+1	4	Qualification for Semi-finals
2	Guangxi Huaqiangu (Q)	2	0	2	0	4	4	0	2	Qualification for Semi-finals
3	Hunan X-Ray	2	0	1	1	4	5	−1	1	

Rules for classification: 1) Points; 2) Head-to-head points; 3) Head-to-head goal difference; 4) Head-to-head goals scored; 5) Goal difference; 6) Goals scored; 7) Disciplinary points (yellow card = 1 point, red card as a result of two yellow cards = 3 points, direct red card = 3 points, yellow card followed by direct red card = 4 points); 8) Drawing of lots.

19 October 2021	Sichuan Tianfu	3–2	Hunan X-Ray	Guposhan Spring Football Town Field 2, Hezhou
15:30 UTC+8				Attendance: 0 Referee: Yuan Shiwei

21 October 2021	Hunan X-Ray	2–2	Guangxi Huaqiangu	Guposhan Spring Football Town Field 1, Hezhou
14:00 UTC+8				Attendance: 0 Referee: Yang Qi

23 October 2021	Guangxi Huaqiangu	2–2	Sichuan Tianfu	Guposhan Spring Football Town Field 2, Hezhou
14:30 UTC+8				Attendance: 0 Referee: Zhang Song

=== Group M ===
Pos	Team	Pld	W	D	L	GF	GA	GD	Pts	Qualification
1	Lingshui Dingli Jingcheng (Q, P)	3	3	0	0	13	1	+12	9	Qualification for Semi-finals
2	Zhuhai Qin'ao (Q, P)	3	2	0	1	9	3	+6	6	Qualification for Semi-finals
3	Anhui OneCity	3	1	0	2	3	8	−5	3	
4	Nanchang Honggu	3	0	0	3	1	14	−13	0	

Rules for classification: 1) Points; 2) Head-to-head points; 3) Head-to-head goal difference; 4) Head-to-head goals scored; 5) Goal difference; 6) Goals scored; 7) Disciplinary points (yellow card = 1 point, red card as a result of two yellow cards = 3 points, direct red card = 3 points, yellow card followed by direct red card = 4 points); 8) Drawing of lots.

22 October 2021	Lingshui Dingli Jingcheng	3–0	Zhuhai Qin'ao	R&F Football School Field 1, Meizhou
13:00 UTC+8				Attendance: 0 Referee: Sun Xun

22 October 2021	Anhui OneCity	2–1	Nanchang Honggu	R&F Football School Field 2, Meizhou
13:00 UTC+8				Attendance: 0 Referee: Chen Sheng

24 October 2021	Zhuhai Qin'ao	3–0	Anhui OneCity	R&F Football School Field 1, Meizhou
15:30 UTC+8				Attendance: 0 Referee: Liu Yang

24 October 2021	Nanchang Honggu	0–6	Lingshui Dingli Jingcheng	R&F Football School Field 2, Meizhou
15:30 UTC+8				Attendance: 0 Referee: Jiao Zi

26 October 2021	Lingshui Dingli Jingcheng	4–1	Anhui OneCity	R&F Football School Field 1, Meizhou
13:00 UTC+8				Attendance: 0 Referee: Shen Guodong

26 October 2021	Nanchang Honggu	0–6	Zhuhai Qin'ao	R&F Football School Field 2, Meizhou
13:00 UTC+8				Attendance: 0 Referee: Zhang Yi

=== Group N ===
Pos	Team	Pld	W	D	L	GF	GA	GD	Pts	Qualification
1	Shanghai Mitsubishi Heavy Industries Flying Lion (Q)	3	3	0	0	11	4	+7	9	Qualification for Semi-finals
2	Guangdong Red Treasure (Q)	3	1	1	1	6	7	−1	4	Qualification for Semi-finals
3	Fujian Quanzhou Qinggong	3	1	0	2	7	8	−1	3	
4	Anhui Litian	3	0	1	2	5	10	−5	1	

Rules for classification: 1) Points; 2) Head-to-head points; 3) Head-to-head goal difference; 4) Head-to-head goals scored; 5) Goal difference; 6) Goals scored; 7) Disciplinary points (yellow card = 1 point, red card as a result of two yellow cards = 3 points, direct red card = 3 points, yellow card followed by direct red card = 4 points); 8) Drawing of lots.

22 October 2021	Shanghai Mitsubishi Heavy Industries Flying Lion	4–1	Guangdong Red Treasure	R&F Football School Field 1, Meizhou
15:30 UTC+8				Attendance: 0 Referee: Liu Yang

22 October 2021	Fujian Quanzhou Qinggong	4–2	Anhui Litian	R&F Football School Field 2, Meizhou
15:30 UTC+8				Attendance: 0 Referee: Hu Tengfei

24 October 2021	Guangdong Red Treasure	2–0	Fujian Quanzhou Qinggong	R&F Football School Field 1, Meizhou
13:00 UTC+8				Attendance: 0 Referee: Wang Xinyao

24 October 2021	Anhui Litian	0–3	Shanghai Mitsubishi Heavy Industries Flying Lion	R&F Football School Field 2, Meizhou
13:00 UTC+8				Attendance: 0 Referee: Zhang Zhihao

26 October 2021	Shanghai Mitsubishi Heavy Industries Flying Lion	4–3	Fujian Quanzhou Qinggong	R&F Football School Field 1, Meizhou
15:30 UTC+8				Attendance: 0 Referee: Hu Tengfei

26 October 2021	Anhui Litian	3–3	Guangdong Red Treasure	R&F Football School Field 2, Meizhou
15:30 UTC+8				Attendance: 0 Referee: Jiao Zi

=== Group O ===
Pos	Team	Pld	W	D	L	GF	GA	GD	Pts	Qualification
1	Meixian Qiuxiang (Q)	2	1	1	0	4	1	+3	4	Qualification for Semi-finals
2	Shaoxing Shangyu Pterosaur (Q, P)	2	0	2	0	2	2	0	2	Qualification for Semi-finals
3	Shanghai Huazheng	2	0	1	1	1	4	−3	1	

Rules for classification: 1) Points; 2) Head-to-head points; 3) Head-to-head goal difference; 4) Head-to-head goals scored; 5) Goal difference; 6) Goals scored; 7) Disciplinary points (yellow card = 1 point, red card as a result of two yellow cards = 3 points, direct red card = 3 points, yellow card followed by direct red card = 4 points); 8) Drawing of lots.

29 October 2021	Shaoxing Shangyu Pterosaur	1–1	Shanghai Huazheng	R&F Football School Field 1, Meizhou
13:30 UTC+8				Attendance: 0 Referee: Zhou Xiao

31 October 2021	Shanghai Huazheng	0–3	Meixian Qiuxiang	R&F Football School Field 2, Meizhou
15:00 UTC+8				Attendance: 0 Referee: Gu Qianchi

2 November 2021	Meixian Qiuxiang	1–1	Shaoxing Shangyu Pterosaur	R&F Football School Field 1, Meizhou
15:00 UTC+8				Attendance: 0

=== Group P ===
Pos	Team	Pld	W	D	L	GF	GA	GD	Pts	Qualification
1	Fuzhou Hengxing (Q)	2	1	1	0	6	2	+4	4 (Note: Head-to-head results: Fuzhou Hengxing 1–1 Shanghai Huajiao. Goal difference: Fuzhou Hengxing +4 and Shanghai Huajiao +2.)	Qualification for Semi-finals
2	Shanghai Huajiao (Q)	2	1	1	0	4	2	+2	4	Qualification for Semi-finals
3	Foshan Jion	2	0	0	2	2	8	−6	0	

Rules for classification: 1) Points; 2) Head-to-head points; 3) Head-to-head goal difference; 4) Head-to-head goals scored; 5) Goal difference; 6) Goals scored; 7) Disciplinary points (yellow card = 1 point, red card as a result of two yellow cards = 3 points, direct red card = 3 points, yellow card followed by direct red card = 4 points); 8) Drawing of lots.
Notes:

29 October 2021	Shanghai Huajiao	3–1	Foshan Jion	R&F Football School Field 2, Meizhou
15:30 UTC+8				Attendance: 0 Referee: Gu Qianchi

31 October 2021	Foshan Jion	1–5	Fuzhou Hengxing	R&F Football School Field 1, Meizhou
13:30 UTC+8				Attendance: 0 Referee: Zhang Yi

2 November 2021	Fuzhou Hengxing	1–1	Shanghai Huajiao	R&F Football School Field 2, Meizhou
15:00 UTC+8				Attendance: 0 Referee: Zhou Xiao

=== Semi-finals ===
The 16 winners of the semi-finals will qualify for the Finals.

18 September 2021	Jinan Xingzhou	1–0	Tianjin Shengde	Luneng Football School Field 1, Weifang
14:30 UTC+8				Attendance: 0 Referee: Liu Yang

18 September 2021	Tai'an Huawei	1–0	Nanjing Tehu	Luneng Football School Field 2, Weifang
15:00 UTC+8				Attendance: 0 Referee: Lin Jun

28 September 2021	Ningxiaren Haixi	3–2	Xinjiang Snowland Tiancheng	Helan Mountain Stadium, Yinchuan
10:00 UTC+8				Attendance: 0 Referee: Liu Yang

28 September 2021	Jingchuan Wenhui	1–1 (5–3 p)	Xinjiang Lingmengzhe	Helan Mountain Stadium, Yinchuan
15:30 UTC+8				Attendance: 0 Referee: Cui Yong

4 October 2021	Qingdao N&E United	0–2	Zibo Qisheng	Luneng Football School Field C1, Weifang
14:30 UTC+8				Attendance: 0 Referee: Liu Xun

4 October 2021	Jiangsu Zhongnan Codion	2–1	Tianjin Yiteng Haitian Xinmei Zhicai	Luneng Football School Field B6, Weifang
15:00 UTC+8				Attendance: 0 Referee: Liu Yang

9 October 2021	Inner Mongolia Hasaer	1–0	Shanxi Longchengren	Helan Mountain Stadium, Yinchuan
10:00 UTC+8				Attendance: 0 Referee: Huang Xiang

9 October 2021	Xi'an Ronghai	1–1 (5–4 p)	Xi'an Yilian	Helan Mountain Stadium, Yinchuan
15:30 UTC+8				Attendance: 0 Referee: Zhu Hao

14 October 2021	Chengdu Top Shine	0–0 (4–5 p)	Yunnan Yukun Steel	Guposhan Spring Football Town Field 1, Hezhou
15:00 UTC+8				Attendance: 0 Referee: Cao Dongpo

14 October 2021	Guangxi Lanhang	0–1	Hubei Huachuang	Guposhan Spring Football Town Field 4, Hezhou
15:30 UTC+8				Attendance: 0 Referee: Zheng Shenfei

25 October 2021	Liuzhou Ranko	0–0 (4–5 p)	Guangxi Huaqiangu	Guposhan Spring Football Town Field 1, Hezhou
14:00 UTC+8				Attendance: 0 Referee: Wang Pengwei

25 October 2021	Sichuan Tianfu	4–0	Lijiang Yuanheng	Guposhan Spring Football Town Field 2, Hezhou
14:30 UTC+8				Attendance: 0 Referee: Yuan Shiwei

28 October 2021	Lingshui Dingli Jingcheng	1–0	Guangdong Red Treasure	R&F Football School Field 1, Meizhou
13:30 UTC+8				Attendance: 0 Referee: Liu Xun

28 October 2021	Shanghai Mitsubishi Heavy Industries Flying Lion	0–0 (4–5 p)	Zhuhai Qin'ao	R&F Football School Field 2, Meizhou
15:30 UTC+8				Attendance: 0 Referee: Liu Yang

4 November 2021	Meixian Qiuxiang	2–0	Shanghai Huajiao	R&F Football School Field 1, Meizhou
13:30 UTC+8				Attendance: 0 Referee: Gu Qianchi

4 November 2021	Fuzhou Hengxing	0–0 (3–4 p)	Shaoxing Shangyu Pterosaur	R&F Football School Field 2, Meizhou
15:30 UTC+8				Attendance: 0 Referee: Zhang Yi

=== Finals ===
20 September 2021	Jinan Xingzhou	3–1	Tai'an Huawei	Luneng Football School Field 1, Weifang
15:00 UTC+8				Attendance: 0 Referee: Liu Xun

30 September 2021	Ningxiaren Haixi	2–0	Jingchuan Wenhui	Helan Mountain Stadium, Yinchuan
15:30 UTC+8				Attendance: 0 Referee: Cui Yong

6 October 2021	Zibo Qisheng	1–0	Jiangsu Zhongnan Codion	Luneng Football School Field C1, Weifang
15:00 UTC+8				Attendance: 0 Referee: Li Zheng

11 October 2021	Inner Mongolia Hasaer	5–1	Xi'an Ronghai	Helan Mountain Stadium, Yinchuan
10:30 UTC+8				Attendance: 0 Referee: Zhang Yi

16 October 2021	Yunnan Yukun Steel	1–1 (3–2 p)	Hubei Huachuang	Guposhan Spring Football Town Field 1, Hezhou
15:30 UTC+8				Attendance: 0 Referee: Cheng Wei

27 October 2021	Guangxi Huaqiangu	1–2	Sichuan Tianfu	Guposhan Spring Football Town Field 1, Hezhou
14:30 UTC+8				Attendance: 0 Referee: Chen Sijian

30 October 2021	Lingshui Dingli Jingcheng	0–3	Zhuhai Qin'ao	R&F Football School Field 1, Meizhou
15:30 UTC+8				Attendance: 0 Referee: Jiao Zi

6 November 2021	Meixian Qiuxiang	6–0	Shaoxing Shangyu Pterosaur	R&F Football School Field 1, Meizhou
15:00 UTC+8				Attendance: 0 Referee: Zhou Xiao

== Finals ==
=== Group stage ===
The draw for the group stage took place on 9 November 2021.

==== Group A ====
Pos	Team	Pld	W	D	L	GF	GA	GD	Pts	Promotion or qualification
1	Hubei Huachuang (Q, P)	3	2	0	1	6	3	+3	6	Qualification for Quarter-finals
2	Shaoxing Shangyu Pterosaur (Q, P)	3	1	2	0	2	1	+1	5	Qualification for Quarter-finals
3	Ningxiaren Haixi	3	1	1	1	2	2	0	4	
4	Sichuan Tianfu	3	0	1	2	0	4	−4	1	

Rules for classification: 1) Points; 2) Head-to-head points; 3) Head-to-head goal difference; 4) Head-to-head goals scored; 5) Goal difference; 6) Goals scored; 7) Disciplinary points (yellow card = 1 point, red card as a result of two yellow cards = 3 points, direct red card = 3 points, yellow card followed by direct red card = 4 points); 8) Drawing of lots.

23 November 2021	Sichuan Tianfu	0–1	Ningxiaren Haixi	Yuxi Science and Education Innovation City Football Training Base Field 1, Yuxi
13:30 UTC+8			70' Gao Furong	Attendance: 0 Referee: Pei Xiaodong

23 November 2021	Shaoxing Shangyu Pterosaur	2–1	Hubei Huachuang	Yuxi Science and Education Innovation City Football Training Base Field 2, Yuxi
13:30 UTC+8	Liu Yang 13'		(pen.) Li Yang	Attendance: 0 Referee: Huang Xiang

25 November 2021	Ningxiaren Haixi	0–0	Shaoxing Shangyu Pterosaur	Yuxi Science and Education Innovation City Football Training Base Field 2, Yuxi
16:00 UTC+8				Attendance: 0 Referee: Chen Sijian

25 November 2021	Hubei Huachuang	3–0	Sichuan Tianfu	Yuxi Science and Education Innovation City Football Training Base Field 4, Yuxi
16:00 UTC+8	Li Yang 26'; Gu Renwu 74' (o.g.); Zhang Yang 79' (pen.)			Attendance: 0 Referee: Jiao Zi

27 November 2021	Sichuan Tianfu	0–0	Shaoxing Shangyu Pterosaur	Yuxi Science and Education Innovation City Football Training Base Field 1, Yuxi
13:30 UTC+8				Attendance: 0 Referee: Li Fan

27 November 2021	Hubei Huachuang	2–1	Ningxiaren Haixi	Yuxi Science and Education Innovation City Football Training Base Field 2, Yuxi
13:30 UTC+8	Liu Feng 8'; Ding Wei 76'		40' Lai Yanglong	Attendance: 0 Referee: Liu Lin

==== Group B ====
Pos	Team	Pld	W	D	L	GF	GA	GD	Pts	Promotion or qualification
1	Jinan Xingzhou (Q, C, P)	3	3	0	0	10	1	+9	9	Qualification for Quarter-finals
2	Jiangsu Zhongnan Codion (Q, P)	3	2	0	1	5	1	+4	6	Qualification for Quarter-finals
3	Yunnan Yukun Steel	3	1	0	2	4	4	0	3	
4	Xi'an Ronghai	3	0	0	3	1	14	−13	0	

Rules for classification: 1) Points; 2) Head-to-head points; 3) Head-to-head goal difference; 4) Head-to-head goals scored; 5) Goal difference; 6) Goals scored; 7) Disciplinary points (yellow card = 1 point, red card as a result of two yellow cards = 3 points, direct red card = 3 points, yellow card followed by direct red card = 4 points); 8) Drawing of lots.

23 November 2021	Yunnan Yukun Steel	0–1	Jiangsu Zhongnan Codion	Hongta Cultural and Sports Center, Yuxi
16:00 UTC+8			78' Wu Dingmao	Attendance: 0 Referee: Liu Lin

23 November 2021	Jinan Xingzhou	7–0	Xi'an Ronghai	Yuxi Science and Education Innovation City Football Training Base Field 4, Yuxi
16:00 UTC+8	Huang Long 40', 52'; Zhang Tao 73'; Du Jinlong 83'; Wang Tong 84'; Song Yi 86'; Zheng Yuxuan 90+2' (pen.)			Attendance: 0

25 November 2021	Jiangsu Zhongnan Codion	0–1	Jinan Xingzhou	Yuxi Science and Education Innovation City Football Training Base Field 1, Yuxi
13:30 UTC+8			55' Du Jinlong	Attendance: 0 Referee: Liu Yang

25 November 2021	Xi'an Ronghai	1–3	Yunnan Yukun Steel	Yuxi Science and Education Innovation City Football Training Base Field 2, Yuxi
13:30 UTC+8	Wei Liping 22'		36' Jiang Zhongxiao; 52' Li Yang; 79' Zhu Jianming	Attendance: 0 Referee: Hu Tengfei

27 November 2021	Yunnan Yukun Steel	1–2	Jinan Xingzhou	Yuxi Science and Education Innovation City Football Training Base Field 2, Yuxi
16:00 UTC+8	Wang Tong 37' (o.g.)		82' Ji Jun; 89' Du Jinlong	Attendance: 0 Referee: Shi Yanzhong

27 November 2021	Xi'an Ronghai	0–4	Jiangsu Zhongnan Codion	Yuxi Science and Education Innovation City Football Training Base Field 4, Yuxi
16:00 UTC+8			56' Bai Xianyi; 63', 83' Wu Dingmao; 71' Lian Renjie	Attendance: 0 Referee: Pei Xiaodong

==== Group C ====
Pos	Team	Pld	W	D	L	GF	GA	GD	Pts	Promotion or qualification
1	Lingshui Dingli Jingcheng (Q, P)	3	2	0	1	6	3	+3	6 (Note: Head-to-head results: Zibo Qisheng 0–3 Meixian Qiuxiang, Meixian Qiuxiang 0–4 Lingshui Dingli Jingcheng, Zibo Qisheng 3–0 Lingshui Dingli Jingcheng.)	Qualification for Quarter-finals
2	Zibo Qisheng (Q, P)	3	2	0	1	7	3	+4	6	Qualification for Quarter-finals
3	Meixian Qiuxiang	3	2	0	1	5	4	+1	6	
4	Jingchuan Wenhui	3	0	0	3	0	8	−8	0	

Rules for classification: 1) Points; 2) Head-to-head points; 3) Head-to-head goal difference; 4) Head-to-head goals scored; 5) Goal difference; 6) Goals scored; 7) Disciplinary points (yellow card = 1 point, red card as a result of two yellow cards = 3 points, direct red card = 3 points, yellow card followed by direct red card = 4 points); 8) Drawing of lots.
Notes:

24 November 2021	Zibo Qisheng	0–3	Meixian Qiuxiang	Yuxi Science and Education Innovation City Football Training Base Field 1, Yuxi
13:30 UTC+8			17' Cao Jinlong; 64' Zhang Zhiquan; 90' Che Xumin	Attendance: 0

24 November 2021	Lingshui Dingli Jingcheng	2–0	Jingchuan Wenhui	Yuxi Science and Education Innovation City Football Training Base Field 2, Yuxi
13:30 UTC+8	Qudret Qurban 27'; Hu Hao 89'			Attendance: 0

26 November 2021	Meixian Qiuxiang	0–4	Lingshui Dingli Jingcheng	Yuxi Science and Education Innovation City Football Training Base Field 1, Yuxi
16:00 UTC+8			5', 8' Wang Jun; 56' Fan Jinrui; 81' Qudret Qurban	Attendance: 0 Referee: Sun Shengyu

26 November 2021	Jingchuan Wenhui	0–4	Zibo Qisheng	Yuxi Science and Education Innovation City Football Training Base Field 4, Yuxi
16:00 UTC+8			49' Li Xingcan; 76' Shi Beisi; 80' Tang Jixing; 90+2' Jin Yongsheng	Attendance: 0 Referee: Liu Xun

28 November 2021	Zibo Qisheng	3–0	Lingshui Dingli Jingcheng	Yuxi Science and Education Innovation City Football Training Base Field 1, Yuxi
13:30 UTC+8	Xu Meng 10', 60'; Yang Song 77'			Attendance: 0 Referee: Sun Shengyu

28 November 2021	Jingchuan Wenhui	0–2	Meixian Qiuxiang	Yuxi Science and Education Innovation City Football Training Base Field 2, Yuxi
13:30 UTC+8			68' (pen.) Qin Wanzhun; 74' Zhang Zhiquan	Attendance: 0 Referee: Zheng Shenfei

==== Group D ====
Pos	Team	Pld	W	D	L	GF	GA	GD	Pts	Promotion or qualification
1	Tai'an Huawei (Q, P)	3	3	0	0	7	2	+5	9	Qualification for Quarter-finals
2	Zhuhai Qin'ao (Q, P)	3	1	1	1	2	3	−1	4	Qualification for Quarter-finals
3	Inner Mongolia Hasaer	3	1	0	2	2	3	−1	3	
4	Guangxi Huaqiangu	3	0	1	2	2	5	−3	1	

Rules for classification: 1) Points; 2) Head-to-head points; 3) Head-to-head goal difference; 4) Head-to-head goals scored; 5) Goal difference; 6) Goals scored; 7) Disciplinary points (yellow card = 1 point, red card as a result of two yellow cards = 3 points, direct red card = 3 points, yellow card followed by direct red card = 4 points); 8) Drawing of lots.

24 November 2021	Zhuhai Qin'ao	1–1	Guangxi Huaqiangu	Yuxi Science and Education Innovation City Football Training Base Field 1, Yuxi
16:00 UTC+8	Merdan Memet 50'		67' Ni Shengjie	Attendance: 0

24 November 2021	Inner Mongolia Hasaer	1–2	Tai'an Huawei	Yuxi Science and Education Innovation City Football Training Base Field 4, Yuxi
16:00 UTC+8	Yang Peng 84'		57' Qin Lei; 86' Ma Dongliang	Attendance: 0

26 November 2021	Guangxi Huaqiangu	0–1	Inner Mongolia Hasaer	Yuxi Science and Education Innovation City Football Training Base Field 4, Yuxi
13:30 UTC+8			78' Yang Peng	Attendance: 0 Referee: Mu Yuchen

26 November 2021	Tai'an Huawei	2–0	Zhuhai Qin'ao	Yuxi Science and Education Innovation City Football Training Base Field 2, Yuxi
13:30 UTC+8	Ma Dongliang 33'; Gao Xin 69'			Attendance: 0 Referee: Huang Xiang

28 November 2021	Zhuhai Qin'ao	1–0	Inner Mongolia Hasaer	Yuxi Science and Education Innovation City Football Training Base Field 1, Yuxi
16:00 UTC+8	Li Weixin 48'			Attendance: 0 Referee: Xing Qi

28 November 2021	Tai'an Huawei	3–1	Guangxi Huaqiangu	Yuxi Science and Education Innovation City Football Training Base Field 4, Yuxi
16:00 UTC+8	Li Xizhen 5'; Xiao Yufeng 28'; Zhou Zehao 83'		23' (pen.) Zhang Jiawei	Attendance: 0 Referee: Liang Caiwei

=== Quarter-finals ===
29 November 2021	Hubei Huachuang	1–1 (3–5 p)	Jiangsu Zhongnan Codion	Yuxi Science and Education Innovation City Football Training Base Field 1, Yuxi
13:30 UTC+8	Yang Chen 90'		90+3' Li Longri	Attendance: 0
	Penalties
	Yang Chen (penalty scored); Ding Wei (penalty scored); Lin Kun (penalty scored); Zheng Yujiang (penalty missed)		(penalty scored) Wu Dingmao; (penalty scored) Bai Xianyi; (penalty scored) Li Donglei; (penalty scored) Lian Fa; (penalty scored) Li Longri

29 November 2021	Jinan Xingzhou	3–1	Shaoxing Shangyu Pterosaur	Yuxi Science and Education Innovation City Football Training Base Field 2, Yuxi
16:00 UTC+8	Du Jinlong 49'; Huang Long 65'; Ji Jun 90'		78' Xie Shixian	Attendance: 0 Referee: Huang Xiang

30 November 2021	Lingshui Dingli Jingcheng	0–0 (7–6 p)	Zhuhai Qin'ao	Yuxi Science and Education Innovation City Football Training Base Field 1, Yuxi
13:30 UTC+8				Attendance: 0 Referee: Liu Lin
	Penalties
	Wu Huan (penalty scored); Wang Tong (penalty missed); Wang Jun (penalty missed); Li Gen (penalty scored); Cao Guodong (penalty scored); Yang Huikang (penalty scored); Hao Shuai (penalty scored); Ababekri Erkin (penalty scored); Wang Junhao (penalty scored)		(penalty scored) Li Weixin; (penalty missed) Gong Liangxuan; (penalty scored) Liu Teng; (penalty scored) Li Zhengyu; (penalty missed) Chen Hongzhen; (penalty scored) Wang Yi; (penalty scored) Tang Chuanshun; (penalty scored) Erpat Musa; (penalty missed) Zhang Xu

30 November 2021	Tai'an Huawei	2–1	Zibo Qisheng	Yuxi Science and Education Innovation City Football Training Base Field 2, Yuxi
16:00 UTC+8	Ling Sihao 71'; Li Song 90+2' (pen.)		76' Tang Jixing	Attendance: 0 Referee: Liu Xun

=== Semi-finals ===
2 December 2021	Jiangsu Zhongnan Codion	2–0	Lingshui Dingli Jingcheng	Yuxi Science and Education Innovation City Football Training Base Field 1, Yuxi
13:30 UTC+8	Yin Hanlong 14'; Lian Renjie 81'			Attendance: 0 Referee: Liang Caiwei

2 December 2021	Jinan Xingzhou	2–1	Tai'an Huawei	Yuxi Science and Education Innovation City Football Training Base Field 1, Yuxi
16:00 UTC+8	Ji Jun 11' (pen.); Song Yi 67'		71' Niu Xiucheng	Attendance: 0 Referee: Xing Qi

=== Final ===
4 December 2021	Jiangsu Zhongnan Codion	0–1	Jinan Xingzhou	Hongta Cultural and Sports Center, Yuxi
14:30 UTC+8			2' Song Yi	Attendance: 0 Referee: Sun Shengyu
