= Luo Andong =

Chinese association football player

Personal information
- Date of birth: 17 December 1995 (age 30)
- Place of birth: Chongqing, Sichuan, China
- Height: 1.80 m (5 ft 11 in)
- Positions: Left-back; midfielder

Youth career
- –2014: Guizhou Renhe

Senior career*
| Years | Team | Apps | (Gls) |
| 2014 | Guizhou Renhe | 0 | (0) |
| 2014 | → Taiyuan Zhongyou Jiayi (loan) | | |
| 2015–2018 | Nei Mongol Zhongyou | 48 | (2) |
| 2019–2021 | Shandong Taishan | 0 | (0) |
| 2020 | → Beijing Renhe (loan) | 13 | (1) |
| 2021 | Jinan Xingzhou | | |
| 2022–2023 | Liaoning Shenyang Urban | 48 | (0) |
| 2024 | Chongqing Tonglianglong | 10 | (0) |
| 2025 | Jiangxi Lushan | 11 | (0) |
- * Club domestic league appearances and goals as of 14:01, 31 December 2023 (UTC)

Luo Andong (Chinese: 罗安东; born 17 December 1995) is a Chinese footballer who most recently played as a left-back or midfielder.

== Club career ==
Luo Andong moved to Shaanxi to further develop his youth career and was part of the Shaanxi under-18 team that participated in the 2013 National Games of China that came fourth. Formerly located Shaanxi team, Guizhou Renhe, accepted him into their youth system and promoted him into their senior team. He went on loan to third tier club Taiyuan Zhongyou Jiayi for the 2014 China League Two campaign. The loan saw the club come runners-up within the division and gain promotion into the second tier. The club made Luo's move permanent as they relocated and renamed themselves Nei Mongol Zhongyou.

On 19 February 2019, Luo transferred to top tier club Shandong Taishan. He did not make any appearances throughout the whole of the 2019 Chinese Super League campaign. The following season, Luo was sent on loan to Beijing Renhe. Upon his return to Shandong he did not make any appearances and joined fourth tier club Jinan Xingzhou. At Jinan Xingzhou, Luo won the 2021 Chinese Champions League and gained promotion with the club.

On 26 April 2022, Luo transferred to second tier club Liaoning Shenyang Urban for the start of the 2022 China League One campaign.

After two seasons, Luo joined Chongqing Tonglianglong on 26 January 2024.

== Career statistics ==
=== Club ===
As of 31 December 2023.

| Club | Season | League | | | Cup | | Continental | | Other | | Total | |
| Club | Season | Division | Apps | Goals | Apps | Goals | Apps | Goals | Apps | Goals | Apps | Goals |
|---|---|---|---|---|---|---|---|---|---|---|---|---|
| Guizhou Renhe | 2014 | Chinese Super League | 0 | 0 | 0 | 0 | 0 | 0 | 0 | 0 | 0 | 0 |
| Taiyuan Zhongyou Jiayi (Loan) | 2014 | China League Two | ? | ? | – | | – | | 0 | 0 | ? | ? |
| Nei Mongol Zhongyou | 2015 | China League One | 10 | 0 | 0 | 0 | – | | 0 | 0 | 10 | 0 |
| Nei Mongol Zhongyou | 2016 | China League One | 9 | 0 | 1 (Note: Appearances in the Chinese FA Cup) | 0 | – | | 0 | 0 | 10 | 0 |
| Nei Mongol Zhongyou | 2017 | China League One | 4 | 0 | 3 | 0 | – | | 0 | 0 | 7 | 0 |
| Nei Mongol Zhongyou | 2018 | China League One | 25 | 2 | 1 | 0 | – | | 0 | 0 | 26 | 2 |
| Nei Mongol Zhongyou | Total | | 48 | 2 | 5 | 0 | 0 | 0 | 0 | 0 | 53 | 2 |
| Shandong Taishan | 2019 | Chinese Super League | 0 | 0 | 0 | 0 | 0 | 0 | 0 | 0 | 0 | 0 |
| Shandong Taishan | 2020 | Chinese Super League | 0 | 0 | 0 | 0 | 0 | 0 | 0 | 0 | 0 | 0 |
| Shandong Taishan | 2021 | Chinese Super League | 0 | 0 | 0 | 0 | 0 | 0 | 0 | 0 | 0 | 0 |
| Shandong Taishan | Total | | 0 | 0 | 0 | 0 | 0 | 0 | 0 | 0 | 0 | 0 |
| Beijing Renhe (loan) | 2020 | China League One | 13 | 1 | 0 | 0 | – | | 0 | 0 | 13 | 1 |
| Jinan Xingzhou | 2021 | Chinese Champions League | – | | – | | – | | – | | – | |
| Liaoning Shenyang Urban | 2022 | China League One | 23 | 0 | 1 | 0 | – | | 0 | 0 | 24 | 0 |
| Liaoning Shenyang Urban | 2023 | China League One | 25 | 0 | 0 | 0 | – | | 0 | 0 | 25 | 0 |
| Liaoning Shenyang Urban | Total | | 48 | 0 | 1 | 0 | 0 | 0 | 0 | 0 | 49 | 0 |
| Career total | | | 98 | 3 | 6 | 0 | 0 | 0 | 0 | 0 | 104 | 3 |

== Honours ==
Jinan Xingzhou

- Chinese Champions League: 2021
