= Li Xiaoting =

Chinese footballer

Li Xiaoting 李晓挺
Personal information
- Date of birth: 3 January 1989 (age 37)
- Place of birth: Dalian, Liaoning, China
- Height: 1.82 m (5 ft 11 1/2 in)
- Positions: Midfielder; defender

Team information
- Current team: Ganzhou Ruishi (head coach)

Youth career
- Dalian Yiteng

Senior career*
| Years | Team | Apps | (Gls) |
| 2006–2012 | Harbin Yiteng | | (15) |
| 2013–2017 | Changchun Yatai | 38 | (1) |
| 2015 | → Harbin Yiteng (loan) | 24 | (4) |
| 2016 | → Shenzhen Renren (loan) | 18 | (2) |
| 2017 | → Heilongjiang Lava Spring (loan) | 20 | (0) |
| 2018–2019 | Sichuan Longfor | 5 | (0) |
| 2020–2021 | Jiangxi Liansheng | 28 | (0) |
| 2022 | Guangxi Pingguo Haliao | 14 | (0) |
| 2022–2023 | Dandong Tengyue | 29 | (0) |
| 2024–2025 | Jiangxi Dingnan United | 6 | (0) |
| 2024 | → Hunan Billows (loan) | 10 | (0) |
| 2025 | → Ganzhou Ruishi (loan) | 2 | (0) |

International career
| 2007 | China U20 | | |

Managerial career
- 2025-2026: Ganzhou Ruishi (team manager)
- 2026: Ganzhou Ruishi
- 2026–: Jiangxi Dingnan United
- * Club domestic league appearances and goals as of 31 December 2025

Li Xiaoting (Chinese: 李晓挺; pinyin: Lǐ Xiǎotǐng; born 3 January 1989) is a Chinese football coach and former football player who currently the head coach of China League Two side Ganzhou Ruishi.

== Club career ==
Li started systemic football training in 2000 when he attended Dalian Xigang Sports School and later joined Dalian Yiteng youth team system. He was promoted to the club's first team in 2006 when Dalian Yiteng moved their home stadium to Harbin and changed their name into Harbin Yiteng for the 2006 China League Two campaign. Finishing second place of the league, Harbin Yiteng won promotion to China League One. Li was linked with Dalian Aerbin but finally stayed due to the disagreement of the transfer fee. In the 2011 China League Two campaign he would be part of the team that won the division and promotion into the second tier.

On 28 February 2013, Li signed a five-year contract with Chinese Super League side Changchun Yatai for a transfer fee of ¥2.6 million. He made his debut for Changchun on 16 March, in a 2–0 away defeat against Shandong Luneng, coming on as a substitute for Zhang Wenzhao in the 33rd minute. On 13 April, Li scored his first Super League goal in a match with Changchun tied with Wuhan Zall 1–1.

Li was loaned back to Harbin Yiteng who was newly relegated to China League One for one season on 31 January 2015. On 7 March 2016, he was loaned to China League Two side Shenzhen Renren until 31 December 2016. In March 2017, Li was loaned to Heilongjiang Lava Spring until 31 December 2017. He joined China League Two club Sichuan Longfor on 28 June 2018.

On 2 July 2026, Li was named as the head coach of China League Two side Ganzhou Ruishi.

== Career statistics ==
Statistics accurate as of match played 31 December 2025.

| Club | Season | League | | | National Cup | | Continental | | Other | | Total | |
| Club | Season | Division | Apps | Goals | Apps | Goals | Apps | Goals | Apps | Goals | Apps | Goals |
|---|---|---|---|---|---|---|---|---|---|---|---|---|
| Harbin Yiteng | 2006 | China League Two | | 0 | - | | - | | - | | | 0 |
| Harbin Yiteng | 2007 | China League One | 12 | 0 | - | | - | | - | | 12 | 0 |
| Harbin Yiteng | 2008 | China League One | 19 | 0 | - | | - | | - | | 19 | 0 |
| Harbin Yiteng | 2009 | China League Two | | 2 | - | | - | | - | | | 2 |
| Harbin Yiteng | 2010 | China League Two | | 1 | - | | - | | - | | | 1 |
| Harbin Yiteng | 2011 | China League Two | 17 | 3 | - | | - | | - | | 17 | 3 |
| Harbin Yiteng | 2012 | China League One | 25 | 9 | 1 | 0 | - | | - | | 26 | 9 |
| Harbin Yiteng | Total | | 73 | 15 | 1 | 0 | 0 | 0 | 0 | 0 | 74 | 15 |
| Changchun Yatai | 2013 | Chinese Super League | 14 | 1 | 2 | 0 | - | | - | | 16 | 1 |
| Changchun Yatai | 2014 | Chinese Super League | 24 | 0 | 1 | 0 | - | | - | | 25 | 0 |
| Changchun Yatai | Total | | 38 | 1 | 3 | 0 | 0 | 0 | 0 | 0 | 41 | 1 |
| Harbin Yiteng (loan) | 2015 | China League One | 24 | 4 | 0 | 0 | - | | - | | 24 | 4 |
| Shenzhen Renren (loan) | 2016 | China League Two | 18 | 2 | 1 | 0 | - | | - | | 19 | 2 |
| Heilongjiang Lava Spring (loan) | 2017 | China League Two | 20 | 0 | 2 | 1 | - | | - | | 22 | 1 |
| Sichuan Longfor | 2018 | China League Two | 5 | 0 | 0 | 0 | - | | - | | 5 | 0 |
| Sichuan Longfor | 2019 | China League One | 0 | 0 | 0 | 0 | - | | - | | 0 | 0 |
| Sichuan Longfor | Total | | 5 | 0 | 0 | 0 | 0 | 0 | 0 | 0 | 5 | 0 |
| Jiangxi Liansheng | 2020 | China League One | 13 | 0 | - | | - | | 0 (Note: Appearances in China League One relegation play-offs) | 0 | 13 | 0 |
| Jiangxi Liansheng | 2021 | China League One | 15 | 0 | 1 | 0 | - | | - | | 16 | 0 |
| Jiangxi Liansheng | Total | | 28 | 0 | 1 | 0 | 0 | 0 | 0 | 0 | 29 | 0 |
| Guangxi Pingguo Haliao | 2022 | China League One | 14 | 0 | 0 | 0 | - | | - | | 14 | 0 |
| Dandong Tengyue | 2022 | China League Two | 5 | 0 | 0 | 0 | - | | - | | 5 | 0 |
| Dandong Tengyue | 2023 | China League One | 24 | 0 | 0 | 0 | - | | - | | 24 | 0 |
| Dandong Tengyue | Total | | 29 | 0 | 0 | 0 | 0 | 0 | 0 | 0 | 29 | 0 |
| Jiangxi Dingnan United | 2024 | China League One | 6 | 0 | 0 | 0 | - | | - | | 14 | 0 |
| Hunan Billows (loan) | 2024 | China League Two | 10 | 0 | 0 | 0 | - | | - | | 10 | 0 |
| Ganzhou Ruishi (loan) | 2025 | China League Two | 2 | 0 | 0 | 0 | - | | - | | 2 | 0 |
| Career total | | | 267 | 22 | 8 | 1 | 0 | 0 | 0 | 0 | 275 | 23 |

== Honours ==
=== Club ===
Harbin Yiteng

- China League Two: 2011
