= Wang Jun (footballer, born April 1990) =

Chinese footballer

Personal information
- Full name: Wang Jun
- Date of birth: April 12, 1990 (age 36)
- Place of birth: Dalian, China
- Height: 1.81 m (5 ft 11 1/2 in)
- Position: Midfielder

Team information
- Current team: Yanbian Longding
- Number: 22

Youth career
- 2006–2008: Beijing Baxy&Shengshi

Senior career*
Years	Team	Apps	(Gls)
2009–2011	Beijing Baxy	36	(6)
2011–2013	Dalian Aerbin	31	(1)
2014–2015	Qingdao Jonoon	43	(8)
2017–2018	Hunan Billows	39	(6)
2019	Yinchuan Helanshan	28	(10)
2020	Wuhan Three Towns	5	(0)
2021	Lingshui Dingli Jingcheng	-	(-)
2022–	Yanbian Longding	1	(0)
- * Club domestic league appearances and goals as of 31 January 2023

Wang Jun (Chinese: 王君; born 12 April 1990) is a Chinese footballer who plays as a midfielder for Yanbian Longding in the China League Two division.

== Club career ==
Wang Jun started his football career with third tier football club Beijing Baxy&Shengshi and saw them take over second tier club Beijing Hongdeng before the start of the 2010 league season. He would go on to establish himself as vital young player within the team before joining promotion chasing club Dalian Aerbin who went on to win the 2011 China League One division and promotion to the top tier.

On 26 February 2014, Wang transferred to China League One side Qingdao Jonoon. He would revive his career and established himself as a vital member of their team. After two seasons with the club his contract would be up for renewal, however he would be unable to negotiate any new terms and the club refused to register him for the 2016 league season. After a season being dropped and seeing out the remainder of his contract, Wang joined third tier club Hunan Billows on 13 March 2017.

On 26 February 2019, Wang transferred to another League Two side in Yinchuan Helanshan. He would personally have his most productive season in his career by scoring ten goals throughout the league campaign, however Yinchuan failed to hand in their salary and bonus confirmation form to the Chinese Football Association and were disqualified for the following 2020 China League Two campaign.

On 8 August 2020, he signed with Wuhan Three Towns. In his first season with the club he would go on to aid them in winning the division title and promotion into the second tier. He would leave to join fourth tier club Lingshui Dingli Jingcheng before joining third tier club Yanbian Longding.

== Career statistics ==
As of 11 January 2023.

Club	Season	League			Cup		Continental		Other		Total	
Club	Season	Division	Apps	Goals	Apps	Goals	Apps	Goals	Apps	Goals	Apps	Goals
Beijing Baxy&Shengshi/ Beijing Baxy	2009	China League Two	0	0	–		–		–		0	0
Beijing Baxy&Shengshi/ Beijing Baxy	2010	China League One	22	5	–		–		–		22	5
Beijing Baxy&Shengshi/ Beijing Baxy	2011	China League One	14	1	0	0	–		–		14	1
Beijing Baxy&Shengshi/ Beijing Baxy	Total		36	6	0	0	0	0	0	0	36	6
Dalian Aerbin	2011	China League One	10	1	0	0	–		–		10	1
Dalian Aerbin	2012	Chinese Super League	17	0	1	0	–		–		18	0
Dalian Aerbin	2013	Chinese Super League	4	0	2	0	–		–		6	0
Dalian Aerbin	Total		31	1	3	0	0	0	0	0	34	1
Qingdao Jonoon	2014	China League One	17	3	3	0	–		–		20	3
Qingdao Jonoon	2015	China League One	26	5	0	0	–		–		26	5
Qingdao Jonoon	Total		43	8	3	0	0	0	0	0	46	8
Hunan Billows	2017	China League Two	21	3	1	0	–		–		22	3
Hunan Billows	2018	China League Two	18	3	2	0	–		–		20	3
Hunan Billows	Total		39	6	3	0	0	0	0	0	42	6
Yinchuan Helanshan	2019	China League Two	28	10	1	0	–		–		29	10
Wuhan Three Towns	2020	China League Two	5	0	–		–		–		5	0
Lingshui Dingli Jingcheng	2021	Chinese Champions League	–		–		–		–		–	
Yanbian Longding	2022	China League Two	1	0	0	0	–		–		1	0
Career total			183	31	10	0	0	0	0	0	193	31

== Honours ==
Dalian Aerbin

- China League One: 2011.

Wuhan Three Towns

- China League Two: 2020.
