= Yu Keli =

Chinese footballer (born 2005)

Personal information
- Date of birth: 1 June 2005 (age 21)
- Place of birth: Nanchang, Jiangxi, China
- Height: 1.78 m (5 ft 10 in)
- Position: Midfielder

Team information
- Current team: Ganzhou Ruishi

Youth career
- 2012–2021: Evergrande Football School
- 2021–2022: Moratalaz

Senior career*
Years	Team	Apps	(Gls)
2023–2024	Guangzhou	0	(0)
2024	→ Haikou Mingcheng (loan)	12	(0)
2025–2026	Dingnan United	0	(0)
2025	→ Ganzhou Ruishi (loan)	22	(0)
2026–	Ganzhou Ruishi	0	(0)
- * Club domestic league appearances and goals as of 22:09, 11 March 2026 (UTC)

Yu Keli (Chinese: 喻克力; born 1 June 2005), is a Chinese footballer currently playing as a midfielder for China League Two club Ganzhou Ruishi.

== Club career ==
Yu enrolled in the Evergrande Football School in 2012, and went on to win multiple accolades and competitions with the academy. In October 2021, he moved to Spain to play for Moratalaz, making his debut on 3 October. A month later, he scored his first goal for the under-19s, a long-range effort in a 1–0 away win. He went on to score three more goals for Moratalaz.

Despite this good start to his career in Spain, he left Moratalaz in August 2022, returning to China. Ahead of the 2023 season, Yu was registered with former club Guangzhou in the China League One. After failing to break into the Guangzhou first team, he was loaned to China League Two club Haikou Mingcheng for the 2024 season.

The following year, he left Guangzhou to join fellow China League One club Dingnan United. In March 2025, he was loaned to Ganzhou Ruishi.

== Career statistics ==
=== Club ===
As of 23 March 2025.

Appearances and goals by club, season and competition
Club	Season	League			Cup		Other		Total	
Club	Season	Division	Apps	Goals	Apps	Goals	Apps	Goals	Apps	Goals
Guangzhou	2023	China League One	0	0	0	0	0	0	0	0
Guangzhou	2024	China League One	0	0	0	0	0	0	0	0
Guangzhou	Total		0	0	0	0	0	0	0	0
Haikou Mingcheng (loan)	2024	China League Two	12	0	2 (Note: Appearances in the Chinese FA Cup)	0	0	0	14	0
Dingnan United	2025	China League One	0	0	0	0	0	0	0	0
Ganzhou Ruishi (loan)	2025	China League Two	1	0	0	0	0	0	1	0
Career total			13	0	2	0	0	0	15	0
