= Jiang Weipeng =

Chinese footballer

Jiang Weipeng 姜卫鹏
Personal information
- Full name: Jiang Weipeng
- Date of birth: 3 January 1993 (age 33)
- Place of birth: Lianyungang, Jiangsu, China
- Height: 1.83 m (6 ft 0 in)
- Position: Defender

Team information
- Current team: Zhuhai Qinao
- Number: 15

Youth career
- Tianjin TEDA

Senior career*
Years	Team	Apps	(Gls)
2013–2015	Tianjin TEDA	0	(0)
2014	→ Jiangxi Liansheng (loan)	1	(0)
2016	Hainan Boying & Seamen	19	(1)
2017–2018	Yanbian Funde	38	(1)
2019–2021	Qingdao FC	17	(0)
2022	Quanzhou Yassin	4	(0)
2022–	Zhuhai Qinao	2	(0)

International career
2012	China U19	1	(0)
2013	China U22	1	(0)
- * Club domestic league appearances and goals as of 5 May 2022

Jiang Weipeng (Chinese: 姜卫鹏; pinyin: Jiāng Wèipéng; Mandarin pronunciation: [tɕjáŋ.wêɪ pʰə̌ŋ]; born 3 January 1993) is a Chinese footballer who plays as a defender for Zhuhai Qinao.

== Club career ==
Jiang Weipeng started his professional football career in 2013 when he was promoted to Chinese Super League side Tianjin Teda. He made his senior debut on 10 July 2013 in a 5–0 away loss against Liaoning Whowin in the 2013 Chinese FA Cup. Jiang was loaned to Tianjin Huaruide in 2014. However, Tianjin Huaruide failed to register for joining the China League Two. He was loaned to China League Two side Jiangxi Liansheng in July 2014. On 2 August 2014, he made his debut for the club in a 1–0 home win against Sichuan Longfor. However, he suffered a severe injury in the training in August 2014, ruling him out for the rest of the season. He played for Tianjin Teda's reserve team in 2015.

Jiang joined to China League Two side Hainan Boying & Seamen in March 2016. He scored his first senior goal on 20 August 2016 in a 1–0 away win against Nantong Zhiyun.

Jiang transferred to Chinese Super League side Yanbian Funde on 19 January 2017. He made his debut for Yanbian on 5 March 2017 in a 0–0 away draw against Chongqing Lifan.

Jiang transferred fellow China League One to Qingdao Huanghai in February 2019.

== Career statistics ==
As of 31 December 2020.

Appearances and goals by club, season and competition
Club	Season	League			National Cup		Continental		Other		Total	
Club	Season	Division	Apps	Goals	Apps	Goals	Apps	Goals	Apps	Goals	Apps	Goals
Tianjin Teda	2013	Chinese Super League	0	0	1	0	-		-		1	0
Jiangxi Liansheng (loan)	2014	China League Two	1	0	0	0	-		-		1	0
Hainan Boying & Seamen	2016	China League Two	19	1	3	0	-		-		22	1
Yanbian Funde	2017	Chinese Super League	25	0	1	0	-		-		26	0
Yanbian Funde	2018	China League One	13	1	1	0	-		-		14	1
Yanbian Funde	Total		38	1	2	0	0	0	0	0	40	1
Qingdao Huanghai	2019	China League One	6	0	2	0	-		-		8	0
Qingdao Huanghai	2020	Chinese Super League	6	0	1	0	-		-		7	0
Qingdao Huanghai	Total		12	0	3	0	0	0	0	0	15	0
Career total			70	2	9	0	0	0	0	0	79	2

== Honours ==
=== Club ===
Qingdao Huanghai

- China League One: 2019
