= Liao Haochuan =

Chinese footballer (born 2000)

Personal information
- Date of birth: 14 July 2000 (age 26)
- Place of birth: Xinyu, Jiangxi, China
- Height: 1.85 m (6 ft 1 in)
- Position: Defender

Team information
- Current team: Ganzhou Ruishi
- Number: 8

Youth career
- –2020: Guangzhou City

Senior career*
Years	Team	Apps	(Gls)
2020–2022	Shanghai Shenhua	0	(0)
2021	→ Qingdao Youth Island (loan)	15	(0)
2023	Dandong Tengyue	10	(0)
2024	Hunan Billows	20	(0)
2025-	Ganzhou Ruishi	26	(1)
- * Club domestic league appearances and goals as of 14:01, 31 January 2023 (UTC)

Liao Haochuan (Chinese: 廖浩川; born 14 July 2000) is a Chinese professional footballer currently playing as a defender for Ganzhou Ruishi.

== Club career ==
Liao Haochuan would be promoted to the senior team of Shanghai Shenhua in the 2020 Chinese Super League season. He would be loaned out to third tier club Qingdao Youth Island on 11 April 2021 to gain more playing time. He would immediately go on to establish himself an integral member of the team that would go on to gain promotion through the play-offs at the end of the 2021 China League Two campaign.

== Career statistics ==
As of 31 January 2023.

Club	Season	League			Cup		Continental		Other		Total	
Club	Season	Division	Apps	Goals	Apps	Goals	Apps	Goals	Apps	Goals	Apps	Goals
Shanghai Shenhua	2020	Chinese Super League	0	0	0	0	0	0	–		0	0
Shanghai Shenhua	2021	Chinese Super League	0	0	0	0	-		-		0	0
Shanghai Shenhua	2022	Chinese Super League	0	0	0	0	-		-		0	0
Shanghai Shenhua	Total		0	0	0	0	0	0	0	0	0	0
Qingdao Youth Island (loan)	2021	China League Two	14	0	3	0	–		1 (Note: Appearance(s) in Promotion/Relegation Play-offs)	0	18	0
Career total			14	0	3	0	0	0	0	0	18	0
