= Moses Odo =

Nigerian footballer (born 1997)

Personal information
- Full name: Moses Tochukwu Odo
- Date of birth: 11 December 1997 (age 28)
- Place of birth: Enugu, Nigeria
- Height: 1.83 m (6 ft 0 in)
- Position: Forward

Team information
- Current team: Bangladesh Police FC
- Number: 94

Senior career*
Years	Team	Apps	(Gls)
2015	Kaduna United	8	(5)
2015	Enugu Rangers	25	(8)
2015–2016	Abia Warriors	11	(6)
2016	Binatli Yilmaz	23	(6)
2016–2017	Yenicami Ağdelen	21	(5)
2017–2018	Real Saphire	14	(6)
2018–2019	Haras El Hodoud	30	(8)
2019–2020	Misr Lel Makkasa	15	(3)
2020	Ghazl El Mahalla	4	(0)
2021	Al-Mokawloon Al-Arab	8	(0)
2021–2022	Al-Quwa Al-Jawiya	6	(3)
2022	Amanat Baghdad	5	(1)
2022–2023	Al-Merrikh	14	(6)
2023	Jinan Xingzhou		
2023–2024	Saint George		
2024	Thep Xanh Nam Dinh		
- * Club domestic league appearances and goals

Moses Tochukwu Odo (born 11 December 1997) is a Nigerian professional footballer who plays as a forward.

== Career ==
Odo's career in football began during his teenage years from when he played for different football clubs including Kaduna United F.C.; Enugu Rangers and Abia Warriors in the Nigerian Professional Football League.

In 2016, Moses Odo ventured outside of Nigeria when he was transferred to Binatli Yilmaz SK in the KTFF Super lig before being temporarily loaned out to Yenicami Agdelen. The following year, he went back to Nigeria and signed with the Nigerian League team, Real Sapphire where he played before joining Haras ElHodoud in Egypt.

At Haras ElHodoud, he scored 10 goals in 32 appearances, then transferred to Misr Lel Makkasa SC and subsequently to Ghazl El Mahalla SC.

At El Mahalla, Moses Odo's contract was terminated after playing in four games without scoring a goal. The club cited disciplinary issues and financial infractions as the reason for ending the player's contract which was originally scheduled to last for two years,

Al Mokawloon Al Arab SC (Arab Contractors) then signed the Odo on a free transfer with the intention of filling the void left by Seifeddine Jaziri, who had then joined Zamalek. In August 2022, he signed officially for Al-Merrikh SC, of Sudan who competed in the 2022/2023 CAF Champions league.

On 24 September 2024, Odo signed for Vietnamese club Thep Xanh Nam Dinh, being registered in the squad for the 2024–25 AFC Champions League Two. In November 2024, the club announced Odo's departure. He only made 3 appearances for the club at the AFC Champions League Two and didn't score any goal.
