= Liao Wei =

Chinese association football player

Personal information
- Date of birth: 12 January 1999 (age 27)
- Height: 1.76 m (5 ft 9 in)
- Position: Midfielder

Team information
- Current team: Hunan Billows
- Number: 17

Youth career
- –2020: Hebei China Fortune

Senior career*
Years	Team	Apps	(Gls)
2020–2022	Hebei FC	45	(3)
2023	Dandong Tengyue	17	(0)
2024-	Hunan Billows	0	(0)
- * Club domestic league appearances and goals as of 14:01, 31 December 2020 (UTC)

Liao Wei (Chinese: 廖伟; born 12 January 1999) is a Chinese footballer currently playing as a midfielder for Hunan Billows.

== Club career ==
Liao Wei was promoted to the senior team of Hebei China Fortune within the 2020 Chinese Super League season and would make his debut in a Chinese FA Cup game on 19 September 2020 against Wuhan Zall F.C. in a 1-1 draw that ended in penalty shootout defeat.

== Career statistics ==
As of 31 December 2020.

Club	Season	League			Cup		Continental		Other		Total	
Club	Season	Division	Apps	Goals	Apps	Goals	Apps	Goals	Apps	Goals	Apps	Goals
Hebei China Fortune	2020	Chinese Super League	3	1	1	0	–		–		4	1
Career total			3	0	1	0	0	0	0	0	4	1
