= Li Xuebo =

Chinese association football player

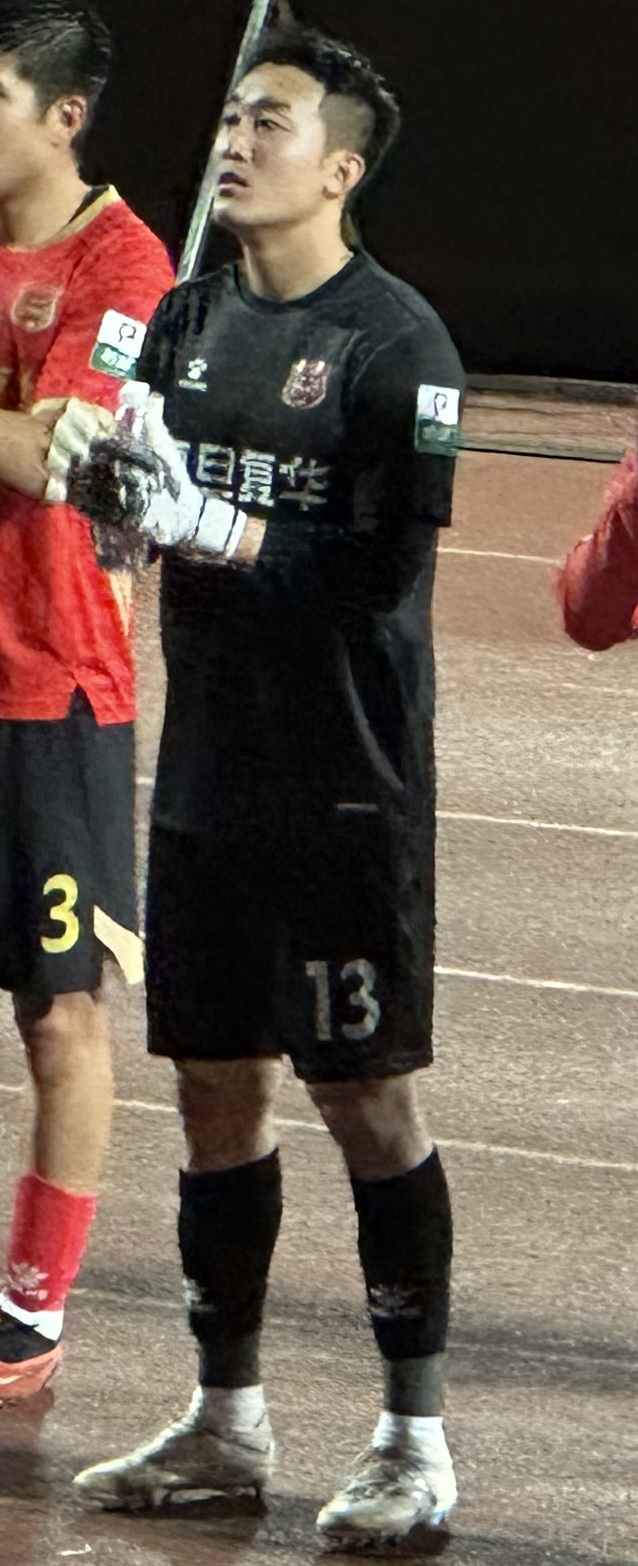
- Li Xuebo in May 2025

Personal information
- Date of birth: 15 November 1999 (age 26)
- Place of birth: Dalian, Liaoning, China
- Height: 1.88 m (6 ft 2 in)
- Position: Goalkeeper

Team information
- Current team: Shijiazhuang Gongfu
- Number: 13

Youth career
- 2012–2019: Atlético Madrid
- 2019–2020: Dalian Pro

Senior career*
Years	Team	Apps	(Gls)
2020–2023	Dalian Pro	2	(0)
2021	→ Zibo Cuju (loan)	1	(0)
2022	→ Zibo Cuju (loan)	25	(0)
2023	→ Dandong Tengyue (loan)	0	(0)
2023	→ Liaoning Shenyang Urban (loan)	14	(0)
2024	Liaoning Tieren	4	(0)
2025	Shanghai Jiading Huilong	15	(0)
2025–	Shijiazhuang Gongfu	10	(0)

International career^{‡}
2019	China U19	1	(0)
- * Club domestic league appearances and goals as of 1 March 2026 ‡ National team caps and goals as of 14:01, 25 July 2021 (UTC)

Li Xuebo (Chinese: 李学博; born 15 November 1999) is a Chinese footballer who plays as a goalkeeper for Shijiazhuang Gongfu.

== Club career ==
Li played for Spanish club Atlético Madrid between 2012 and 2019, as part of a Wanda Group initiative to encourage young Chinese footballers to play in Spain. Li Xuebo would return to China with Dalian Pro where he would be promoted to their senior team and go on to make his debut in a league game against Tianjin TEDA on 31 October 2020, in a 2-1 victory.

== Career statistics ==
As of 1 March 2026.

Club	Season	League			Cup		Continental		Other		Total	
Club	Season	Division	Apps	Goals	Apps	Goals	Apps	Goals	Apps	Goals	Apps	Goals
Dalian Pro	2020	Chinese Super League	2	0	0	0	-		-		2	0
Dalian Pro	2021	Chinese Super League	0	0	0	0	-		0 (Note: Appearance(s) in Promotion/Relegation Play-offs)	0	0	0
Dalian Pro	Total		2	0	0	0	0	0	0	0	2	0
Zibo Cuju (loan)	2021	China League One	1	0	0	0	-		-		1	0
Zibo Cuju (loan)	2022	China League One	25	0	2	0	-		-		27	0
Zibo Cuju (loan)	Total		26	0	2	0	0	0	0	0	28	0
Dandong Tengyue (loan)	2023	China League One	0	0	1	0	-		-		1	0
Liaoning Shenyang Urban (loan)	2023	China League One	14	0	0	0	-		-		14	0
Liaoning Tieren	2024	China League One	4	0	1	0	-		-		5	0
Shanghai Jiading Huilong	2025	China League One	15	0	0	0	-		-		15	0
Shijiazhuang Gongfu	2025	China League One	10	0	0	0	-		-		10	0
Career total			71	0	4	0	0	0	0	0	75	0
