= Lu Qiang =

Chinese scientist (1936–2022)

- 卢强
- Born: 19 May 1936; Wuwei County, Anhui, China
- Died: 23 December 2022 (aged 86); Beijing, China
- Education: Tsinghua University
- Scientific career
- Fields: Automatic control Power system dynamics
- Workplaces: Tsinghua University

Chinese name
- Simplified Chinese: 卢强
- Traditional Chinese: 盧強
Transcriptions
Standard Mandarin
- Hanyu Pinyin: Lú Qiáng

Lu Qiang (Chinese: 卢强; 19 May 1936 – 23 December 2022) was a Chinese scientist, and an academician of the Chinese Academy of Sciences.

Lu was a member of the Central Committee of the China Democratic League. He was a member of the Standing Committee of the 8th, 9th, and 10th Chinese People's Political Consultative Conference.

== Biography ==
Lu was born in Wuwei County (now Wuwei), Anhui, on 19 May 1936. He attended Xinghuaquan Primary School and Wuhu No.1 High School. He received his bachelor's degree and master's degree from Tsinghua University in 1959 and 1964, respectively. After graduating in 1964, he stayed at the university and worked there.

In 1984, Lu became a visiting professor of the Colorado State University. He returned to China in July 1987 and continued to teach at the Tsinghua University.

On 22 December 2022, Lu died in Beijing, at the age of 86.

== Honours and awards ==
- 1988 State Natural Science Award (Second Class)
- 1991 Member of the Chinese Academy of Sciences (CAS)
- 2003 Fellow of the Institute of Electrical and Electronics Engineers (IEEE)
- 2006 Foreign Academician of the Royal Swedish Academy of Engineering Sciences (IVA)
- 2008 State Natural Science Award (Second Class)
