= Wang Tong (footballer, born 1997) =

Chinese association football player

Personal information
- Date of birth: 2 August 1997 (age 29)
- Place of birth: Jinan, Shandong, China
- Height: 1.84 m (6 ft 0 in)
- Position: Midfielder

Youth career
- –2017: Shanghai Shenxin

Senior career*
Years	Team	Apps	(Gls)
2018–2020	Shenzhen FC	4	(0)
2021–2023	Jinan Xingzhou	11	(0)
- * Club domestic league appearances and goals as of 14:01, 31 December 2020 (UTC)

Wang Tong (simplified Chinese: 王统; traditional Chinese: 王統; pinyin: Wáng Tǒng; born 2 August 1997) is a Chinese footballer who plays as a midfielder.

== Club career ==
Wang Tong would play for the Shenzhen FC youth team and was promoted to the senior team in the 2018 China League One campaign where he made his debut and scored his first goal in a Chinese FA Cup game on 10 April 2018 against Suzhou Dongwu in a 2-1 defeat. He went on to be part of the squad would gain promotion to the top tier at the end of the league campaign.

== Career statistics ==
As of 31 December 2020.

Club	Season	League			Cup		Continental		Other		Total	
Club	Season	Division	Apps	Goals	Apps	Goals	Apps	Goals	Apps	Goals	Apps	Goals
Shenzhen FC	2018	China League One	3	0	1 (Note: Appearances in the Chinese FA Cup)	1	–		0	0	4	1
Shenzhen FC	2019	Chinese Super League	1	0	0	0	–		0	0	1	0
Career total			4	0	1	1	0	0	0	0	5	1
