= Jinan Xingzhou F.C. =

Chinese football club

Jinan Xingzhou 济南兴洲
- Full name: Jinan Xingzhou Football Club 济南兴洲足球俱乐部
- Founded: 2013; 12 years ago
- Dissolved: 16 February 2024; 19 months ago
- Ground: Zaozhuang Sports and Cultural Centre Stadium
- Capacity: 31,284
- Manager: Tang Jing
- 2023: China League One, 6th of 16
Home colours	Away colours

Jinan Xingzhou Football Club (Chinese: 济南兴洲足球俱乐部) was a Chinese professional football club based in Jinan, Shandong. Jinan Xingzhou played its home matches at the Zaozhuang Sports and Cultural Centre Stadium, located within the Xuecheng District of Zaozhuang, Shandong.

== History ==
The club was originally founded in 2013 as an amateur football club named Jinan Phebe 88 F.C. They went through various name changes throughout the years while taking part in local amateur competitions until finally renaming themselves as Jinan Xingzhou F.C. in 2017. They participated in Chinese Champions League in 2021 and was promoted to China League Two. In 2022, the club won China League Two and was promoted to China League One.

== Name history ==
- 2013 Jinan Phebe 88 F.C. 济南菲芘88
- 2014–2015 Jinan Icolog F.C. 济南艾可洛奇
- 2015–2016 Shandong Vatage F.C. 山东万致
- 2017– Jinan Xingzhou F.C. 济南兴洲

== Players ==
=== Current squad ===
As of 21 February 2024

Note: Flags indicate national team as defined under FIFA eligibility rules; some limited exceptions apply. Players may hold more than one non-FIFA nationality.

No.	Pos.	Nation	Player
1	GK	CHN	Mu Qianyu
5	DF	CHN	Song Bowei
6	DF	CHN	Song Yi
8	MF	CHN	Sang Yifei
11	FW	NGA	Moses Tochukwu Odo
12	DF	CHN	Li Suda
13	DF	CHN	Zhai Zhaoyu
15	MF	CHN	Wang Tong
16	GK	CHN	Deng Xiaofei

No.	Pos.	Nation	Player
18	FW	CMR	Robert Ndip Tambe
22	MF	CHN	Li Mingfan
30	GK	CHN	Zheng Hao
31	FW	CHN	Tan Tiancheng
34	MF	CHN	Liu Xingyun
35	DF	CHN	Dai Lin
37	DF	CHN	Yi Xianlong
39	MF	CHN	Cao Enze
41	MF	CHN	Zeng Yaozhang

== Honours ==
League

- China League Two
  - Champions (1): 2022
- CFAMA Champions League
  - Champions (1): 2021
