= Wang Xiao (footballer, born 1979) =

Chinese footballer

Wang Xiao 王霄
Personal information
- Date of birth: 30 August 1979 (age 47)
- Place of birth: Shenyang, Liaoning, China
- Height: 1.82 m (6 ft 0 in)
- Position: Defender

Youth career
- 1994–2000: Liaoning FC

Senior career*
Years	Team	Apps	(Gls)
2001–2003	Yunnan Hongta	68	(0)
2004–2010	Tianjin TEDA	118	(1)

International career
2007–2010	China	13	(0)

Managerial career
- 2011–2015: Tianjin Teda (assistant)
- ?–2021: Hebei Zhuoao
- 2022: Zhuhai Qinao
- 2023: Guangxi Pingguo Haliao
- 2023–2024: Guangxi Pingguo Haliao (sporting director)
- 2024: Guangxi Pingguo Haliao (interim)
- 2025: Qingdao Red Lions (sporting director)
- 2025: Qingdao Red Lions
Medal record
Representing China
Men's football
EAFF Championship
Bronze medal – third place	2008 China	Team
- * Club domestic league appearances and goals

Wang Xiao (Chinese: 王霄; pinyin: Wáng Xiāo; born 30 August 1979) is a Chinese football football and former football player who previously played for Yunnan Hongta and Tianjin TEDA as a centre-back.

== Club career ==
=== Yunnan Hongta ===
Wang was born in Shenyang, Liaoning. He originally began his football career with the Liaoning FC youth team in 1994 until 1998 when he spent a short period with the Chinese national youth team. He would return to Liaoning F.C. youth team the following year and would remain with them until 2000 when he left after being unable to break into their senior team. He would instead move to Yunnan Hongta in 2001 to begin his professional football career and in his debut season he quickly established himself as a regular for the senior team. An integral member of the Yunnan team for the following seasons Wang Xiao time at the club was cut short when Chongqing Lifan F.C. decided to merge with Yunnan and Wang Xiao was allowed to leave.

=== Tianjin TEDA ===
Wang transferred to Tianjin TEDA at the beginning of the 2004 Chinese Super League season and would make his club debut when he played in their first game on the season on May 15, 2004 against Chongqing Lifan F.C. in a 0–0 draw. By the following season he had established himself as a key member of the team and by the 2006 league season he had become the team's captain after Yu Genwei retired. His reputation at Tianjin would grow when he was able to lead them to their first continental cup campaign in the 2009 AFC Champions League, however his poor performance within the campaign saw him stripped of the captaincy and it given to Cao Yang. Injury and suspensions would then see Wang Xiao miss much of the league season to end a disappointing 2009 league season. During 2010, he became the team captain again after former captain Cao Yang got injured at the beginning of the season 2010. Later he got injured after several games, his teammate Marko Zorić took his armband. After fighting with serious injuries, he had announced his retirement at the end of the season.

== Coaching career ==
After retirement from playing, Wang became the assistant coach with Tianjin TEDA. He left the club in 2015 after changes in the club management.

In July 2021, Wang joined Guangxi Pingguo Haliao as manager and coach. In October, Wang returned to Tianjin for investigations in incidents during his tenure with Tianjin Teda.

== International career ==
Wang Xiao would make his official senior debut on October 28, 2007 against Myanmar in a FIFA World Cup qualification game that China won 4–0. Under the recently appointed Chinese head coach Vladimir Petrović he was an integral member of his team and was named as the vice captain for Chinese National Team in their unsuccessful 2010 FIFA World Cup qualification campaign. After Vladimir Petrović left Wang Xiao would play one further game for China on January 14, 2009 against Syria in an AFC Asian Cup qualification game that China lost 3–2.
