= Zibo Qisheng F.C. =

Chinese football club

Zibo Qisheng 淄博齐盛
- Full name: Zibo Qisheng Football Club 淄博齐盛足球俱乐部
- Founded: 1 July 2015; 10 years ago
- Ground: Zibo Sports Center Stadium
- Capacity: 45,000
- Manager: Li Yangyang
- 2023: China League Two, 16th of 16 (relegated & withdrew)

Zibo Qisheng Football Club (Chinese: 淄博齐盛足球俱乐部) is a Chinese football club based in Zibo, Shandong. Zibo Qisheng plays its home matches at the Zibo Sports Center Stadium, located within Zhangdian District.

== History ==
Weifang Juexiaoya F.C. was founded in Weifang, Shandong on 1 July 2015. In 2021, the club moved to Zibo and renamed themselves as Zibo Qisheng F.C. They then participated in the 2021 Chinese Champions League and gained promotion to China League Two.

== Name history ==
- 2015–2021 Weifang Juexiaoya F.C. 潍坊绝小鸭
- 2021– Zibo Qisheng F.C. 淄博齐盛
