= Dandong Tengyue F.C. =

Chinese football club

Dandong Tengyue 丹东腾跃
- Full name: Dandong Tengyue Football Club 丹东市腾跃足球俱乐部
- Founded: 1999; 26 years ago
- Ground: Huludao Sports Centre Stadium
- Capacity: 32,000
- Manager: Wang Bo
- 2023: China League One, 13th of 16 (withdrew)
Home colours	Away colours

Dandong Tengyue Football Club (Chinese: 丹东市腾跃足球俱乐部) is a Chinese football club based in Huludao, Liaoning, that last competed in China League One. Dandong Tengyue plays its home matches at the Huludao Sports Centre Stadium, within Longgang District.

== History ==
Dandong Hantong F.C. was founded in 1999. The club participated in Chinese Champions League in 2020 and was promoted to China League Two. In 2021, the club changed its name to Dandong Tengyue F.C.

After playing the 2023 China League One season in Huludao to a lack of suitable stadiums in Dandong, the club officially moved in the city in January 2024.

== Name history ==
- 1999–2020: Dandong Hantong F.C. (丹东瀚通)
- 2021–present: Dandong Tengyue F.C. (丹东腾跃)

== Players ==
=== Current squad ===
As of 1 January 2024

Note: Flags indicate national team as defined under FIFA eligibility rules; some limited exceptions apply. Players may hold more than one non-FIFA nationality.

No.	Pos.	Nation	Player
1	GK	(China) CHN	Kou Jiahao
3	FW	(China) CHN	Zhang Hui
6	MF	(South Korea) KOR	Noh Dae-Seung
13	GK	(China) CHN	Li Xuebo
15	FW	(China) CHN	Huang Kaizhou
17	DF	(China) CHN	Liao Wei
20	FW	(China) CHN	Cui Hao
21	DF	(China) CHN	Dong Kaining

No.	Pos.	Nation	Player
23	MF	(Hong Kong) HKG	Remi Dujardin
25	MF	(China) CHN	Li Chenguang
26	FW	(China) CHN	Luan Zhibo
27	DF	(China) CHN	Liao Haochuan
28	DF	(China) CHN	Lü Yuefeng
29	FW	(China) CHN	Chen Saixu
31	FW	(China) CHN	Zhu Fu
33	DF	(China) CHN	Liu Bin
40	DF	(China) CHN	Liu Zhizhi
41	FW	(China) CHN	Wang Tianqing
43	DF	(China) CHN	Zhang Jialun
