= Zhuhai Qin'ao F.C. =

Chinese football club

Zhuhai Qin'ao 珠海琴澳
- Full name: Zhuhai Qin'ao Football Club 珠海琴澳足球俱乐部
- Founded: 8 January 2005; 20 years ago
- Ground: Zhuhai Stadium
- Capacity: 35,000
- Manager: Wang Xiao
- League: China League Two
- 2022: League Two, 7th of 18

Zhuhai Qin'ao Football Club (Chinese: 珠海琴澳足球俱乐部) was a professional Chinese football club that participated in the China League Two. The team was based in Hengqin, Zhuhai, Guangdong.

== History ==
Beijing Land Tiger F.C. was founded on 8 January 2005 in Beijing. In 2016, the club changed their name to Beijing City United F.C. In 2021, they moved to the Hengqin district of Zhuhai, Guangdong and changed their name to Zhuhai Qin'ao F.C. The club participated in Chinese Champions League in 2021 and was promoted to China League Two. In June 2022, the club changed its Chinese name.

== Name history ==
- 2005–2015 Beijing Land Tiger F.C. (北京路虎)
- 2016–2020 Beijing City United F.C. (北京京城联)
- 2021– Zhuhai Qin'ao F.C. (珠海琴澳)
