= Ganzhou Ruishi F.C. =

Chinese football club

Ganzhou Ruishi 赣州瑞狮
- Full name: Ganzhou Ruishi Football Club 赣州瑞狮足球俱乐部
- Founded: 2017; 9 years ago (as Shaoxing Jiayu Pterosaur F.C.); 6 February 2024; 2 years ago (as Ganzhou Ruishi F.C.)
- Ground: Dingnan Youth Football Training Center
- Capacity: 12,000
- Chairman: Cui Ze
- Manager: Li Xiaoting
- League: China League Two
- 2025: China League Two, 19th of 24

Ganzhou Ruishi Football Club (simplified Chinese: 赣州瑞狮足球俱乐部; traditional Chinese: 贛州瑞獅足球俱樂部; pinyin: Gànzhōu Ruìshī Zúqiú Jùlèbù), currently known as Ganzhou Ruishi Dingnan Tourism Investment (simplified Chinese: 赣州瑞狮定南旅投; traditional Chinese: 贛州瑞獅定南旅投) for sponsorship reasons, is a Chinese professional football club based in Dingnan, Ganzhou, Jiangxi, that competes in China League Two, the third tier of Chinese football. Ganzhou Ruishi plays its home matches at the Dingnan Youth Football Training Center, located within Dingnan County.

== History ==
Shaoxing Shangyu Pterosaur logo used between 2017 and 2023

Shaoxing Jiayu Pterosaur F.C. was founded in 2017. In 2019, the club changed its name to Shaoxing Shangyu Pterosaur F.C.. The club participated in Chinese Champions League in 2021 and was promoted to China League Two.

On 2 February 2024, the Chinese Football Association confirmed the club's relocation to the province of Jiangxi.

== Name history ==
- 2017–2018 Shaoxing Jiayu Pterosaur F.C. 绍兴嘉誉翼龙
- 2019–2024 Shaoxing Shangyu Pterosaur F.C. 绍兴上虞翼龙
- 2024– Ganzhou Ruishi F.C. 赣州瑞狮
