= Shi Letian =

Chinese footballer (born 2003)

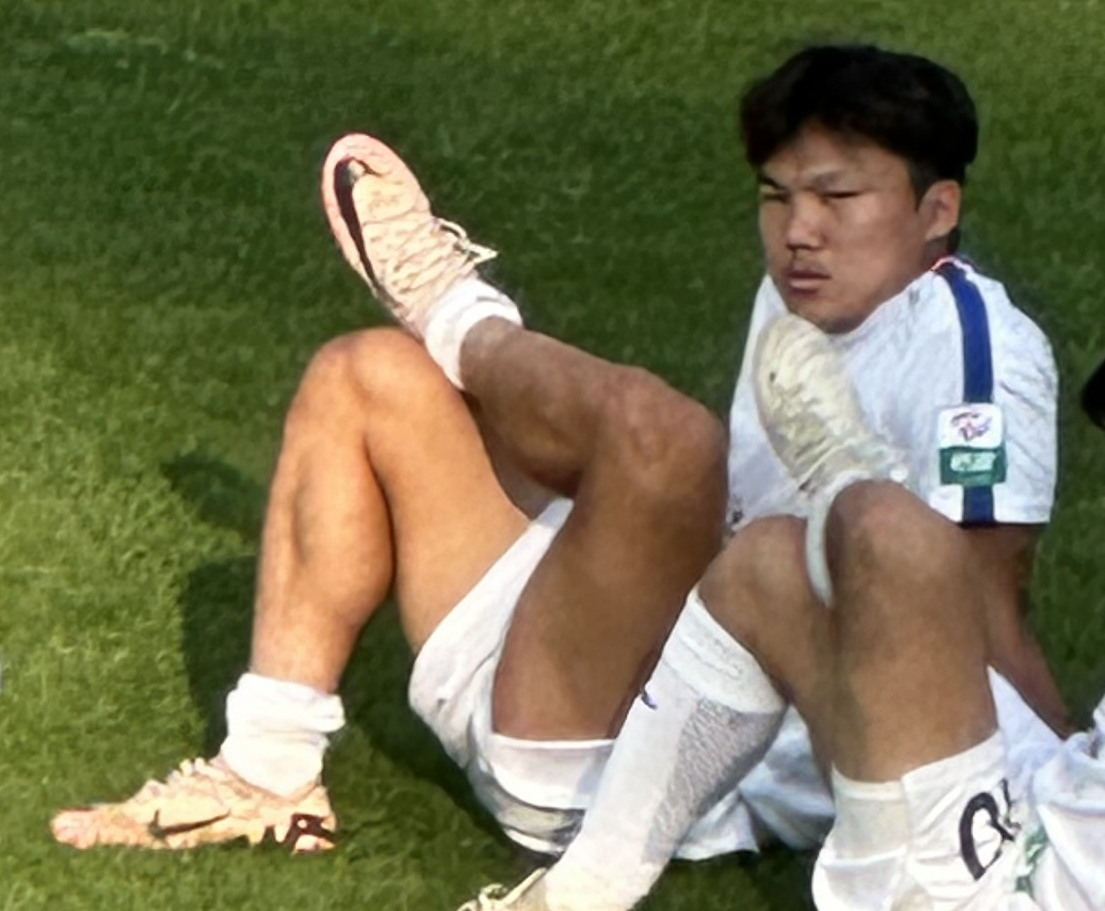
- Shi Letian in June 2025

Personal information
- Date of birth: 12 January 2003 (age 23)
- Place of birth: Changji, Xinjiang, China
- Position: Forward

Team information
- Current team: Xiamen Feilu

Youth career
- 2010–2018: Shandong Luneng
- 2018–2021: Marcet Football Academy
- 2018–2021: Neurofutbol
- 2021: Langreo

Senior career*
Years	Team	Apps	(Gls)
2021–2022	Langreo B	15	(0)
2022–2023	Jingchuan Wenhui	0	(0)
2023–2024	Haikou Mingcheng	19	(2)
2024	Rizhao Yuqi	10	(1)
2024–2025	Guangdong GZ-Power	4	(0)
2025–2026	Beijing Institute of Technology	28	(10)
2026–	Xiamen Feilu	0	(0)
- * Club domestic league appearances and goals as of 11:50, 8 March 2026 (UTC)

Shi Letian (Chinese: 史乐天; born 12 January 2003) is a Chinese footballer who plays as a forward for China League Two club Xiamen Feilu.

== Club career ==
Born in Changji, Xinjiang, Shi started playing football at school, before his parents sent him to Shandong for football training. He played for Shandong Luneng between the ages of 7 and 15, before moving to Spain in 2018 to study at the Marcet Football University's program in Catalonia.

While in Spain, he joined youth academy Neurofutbol, where he scored 20 goals in 24 games at under-16 level. He was promoted to the under-19 team, before a move to professional side Langreo in August 2021. Initially assigned to the under-19 squad, where he made his debut in September 2021, he went on to represent the club's 'B' team in the Tercera División RFEF.

In 2022, he returned to China, signing for Chinese Champions League side Jingchuan Wenhui. He played in Jiangchuan Wenhui's shock penalty shoot-out win over Chinese Super League side Beijing Gouan on 17 November 2022.

== Personal life ==
Shi's father, Shi Yuxin, was also a footballer, but suffered a serious leg injury in a car crash in 1992, forcing him to retire prematurely.

On a brief return to China in 2020, Shi felt ill at the Beijing Capital International Airport, informing staff, and was diagnosed with COVID-19. He spent a month recovering in the Beijing Ditan Hospital, before donating to the "Coronavirus Prevention and Control" through the Red Cross Society of China.

== Career statistics ==
=== Club ===
As of 27 January 2023.

Club	Season	League			Cup		Other		Total	
Club	Season	Division	Apps	Goals	Apps	Goals	Apps	Goals	Apps	Goals
Langreo B	2021–22	Tercera División RFEF	15	0	0	0	0	0	15	0
Jingchuan Wenhui	2022	Chinese Champions League	–		1 (Note: Appearances in the Chinese FA Cup)	0	0	0	1	0
Hainan Star	2023	China League Two	0	0	0	0	0	0	0	0
Career total			15	0	1	0	0	0	16	0
