= Han Zilong =

Chinese footballer (born 1994)

Han Zilong 韩子龙
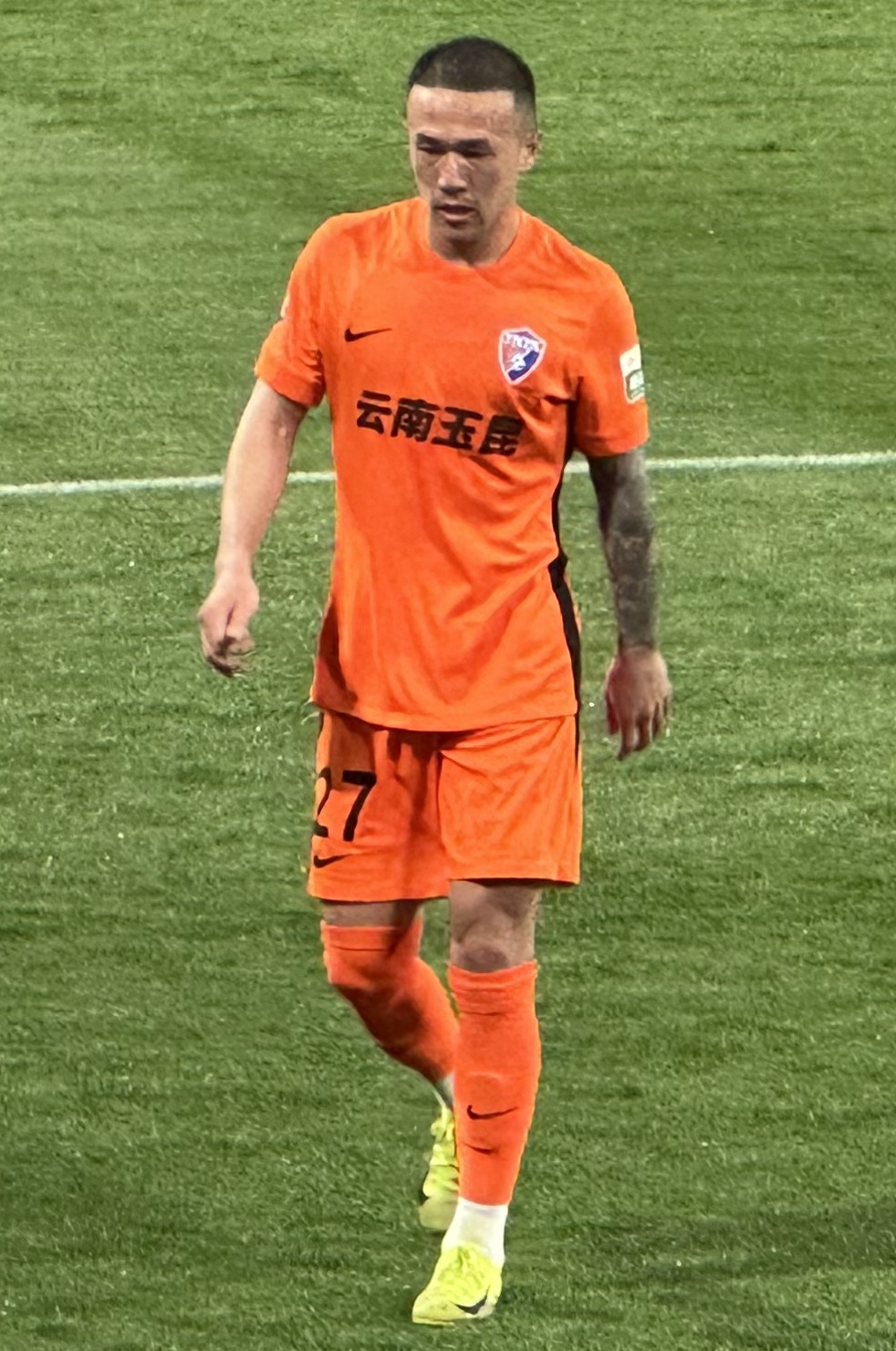
- Han Zilong in May 2025

Personal information
- Full name: Han Zilong
- Date of birth: 6 April 1994 (age 32)
- Place of birth: Shenyang, Liaoning, China
- Height: 1.81 m (5 ft 11 1/2 in)
- Position: Winger

Team information
- Current team: Yunnan Yukun
- Number: 27

Youth career
- 2010–2013: Hebei Elite

Senior career*
Years	Team	Apps	(Gls)
2014–2017	Hebei Elite	61	(19)
2018–2021	Changchun Yatai	8	(0)
2021	→ Hebei Zuhoao (loan)	12	(5)
2022	Zibo Cuju	10	(1)
2023–	Yunnan Yukun	83	(32)
- * Club domestic league appearances and goals as of 19 November 2026

Han Zilong (Chinese: 韩子龙; pinyin: Hán Zǐlóng; born 6 April 1994) is a Chinese footballer who currently plays for Yunnan Yukun in the Chinese Super League.

== Club career ==
Han Zilong joined Hebei Elite's youth academy in 2010 and received training with the club at Brazil between 2010 and 2013. He returned to China in 2014 when Hebei Elite turned to professional club and joined China League Two. Han made his senior debut as well as the club's first professional match on 30 March 2014, in the first round of 2014 Chinese FA Cup which Hebei lost to Lijiang Jiayunhao 2–0. He scored 19 goals in 61 league appearances for the club from 2014 to 2017 League Two season.

Han transferred to Chinese Super League side Changchun Yatai on 10 February 2018. On 2 March 2018, he made his debut for the club in a 1–1 away draw against Shanghai Greenland Shenhua, coming on as a substitute for Tan Long in the 88th minute.

== Career statistics ==
As of 15 June 2024.

Appearances and goals by club, season and competition
Club	Season	League			National Cup		Continental		Other		Total	
Club	Season	Division	Apps	Goals	Apps	Goals	Apps	Goals	Apps	Goals	Apps	Goals
Hebei Elite	2014	China League Two	13	3	1	0	-		-		14	3
Hebei Elite	2015	China League Two	7	1	2	1	-		-		9	2
Hebei Elite	2016	China League Two	19	9	0	0	-		-		19	9
Hebei Elite	2017	China League Two	22	6	2	0	-		-		24	6
Hebei Elite	Total		61	19	5	1	0	0	0	0	66	20
Changchun Yatai	2018	Chinese Super League	8	0	1	0	-		-		9	0
Changchun Yatai	2019	China League One	0	0	0	0	-		-		0	0
Changchun Yatai	Total		8	0	1	0	0	0	0	0	9	0
Hebei Zuhoao (loan)	2021	China League Two	12	5	0	0	-		-		12	5
Zibo Cuju	2022	China League One	10	1	0	0	-		-		12	5
Yuxi Yukun/Yunnan Yukun	2022	Chinese Champions League	-		-		-		-		-	
Yuxi Yukun/Yunnan Yukun	2023	China League Two	21	19	1	0	-		-		22	19
Yuxi Yukun/Yunnan Yukun	2024	China League One	12	3	1	0	-		-		13	3
Yuxi Yukun/Yunnan Yukun	Total		33	22	2	0	0	0	0	0	35	22
Career total			124	47	8	1	0	0	0	0	132	48

== Honours ==
Yuxi Yukun/Yunnan Yukun

- CMCL: 2022
