= Yao Haoyang =

Chinese footballer (born 2006)

Personal information
- Date of birth: 28 October 2006 (age 20)
- Place of birth: Dalian, Liaoning, China
- Height: 1.95 m (6 ft 5 in)
- Position: Goalkeeper

Team information
- Current team: Chongqing Tonglianglong
- Number: 1

Senior career*
Years	Team	Apps	(Gls)
2023–2025	Hubei Istar	11	(0)
2024	→ Yunnan Yukun (loan)	28	(0)
2025	→ Chongqing Tonglianglong (loan)	17	(0)
2026–	Chongqing Tonglianglong	29	(0)

International career^{‡}
2025–	China U23	1	(0)
Medal record
Men's football
Representing China
Asian Games
Bronze medal – third place	2026 Aichi–Nagoya	Team
- * Club domestic league appearances and goals as of 19 November 2026 ‡ National team caps and goals as of 12 July 2026

Yao Haoyang (Chinese: 姚浩洋; pinyin: Yáo Hàoyáng; born 28 October 2006) is a Chinese professional footballer who plays as a goalkeeper for Chinese Super League club Chongqing Tonglianglong.

== Early life and youth career ==
Yao Haoyang was born on 28 October 2006. He attended Dalian Dongbeilu Primary School and later entered the Hubei FA Xinghui Youth Academy. During his youth career, he won the Second National Youth Games championship and was named best player.

== Club career ==
=== Hubei Istar ===
In 2023, Yao Haoyang was promoted to the first team of Hubei Istar. He made his professional debut that season, making 11 appearances and keeping 3 clean sheets.

=== Yunnan Yukun ===
In 2024, Yao Haoyang joined Yunnan Yukun on loan. He made 28 appearances in China League One, helping the team win the league title and achieve promotion to the Chinese Super League. He kept 15 clean sheets during the season. He was named the 2024 China League One Best Goalkeeper and was selected to the league's Team of the Year.

In October 2024, after Yunnan Yukun secured promotion to the Chinese Super League, Yao Haoyang stated in an interview that he was satisfied with his performance and hoped to remain with the club.

On 22 January 2025, Yao Haoyang posted on social media to farewell Yunnan Yukun.

=== Chongqing Tonglianglong ===
In January 2025, Yao Haoyang joined Chongqing Tonglianglong on loan. In the 2025 season, he made 17 starts in China League One, playing a key role in the team's promotion to the Chinese Super League. He kept 7 clean sheets and conceded an average of 0.88 goals per match.

In November 2025, following Chongqing Tonglianglong's promotion to the Chinese Super League, the club was in negotiations with Hubei Istar regarding Yao Haoyang's permanent transfer.

On 26 January 2026, Chongqing Tonglianglong officially announced the permanent signing of Yao Haoyang from Hubei Youth Star on a five-year contract. The transfer fee was reported to be approximately 7 million yuan.

On 7 March 2026, Yao Haoyang made his Chinese Super League debut for Chongqing Tonglianglong against Tianjin Jinmen Tiger, keeping a clean sheet in a 0–0 draw and helping the team earn their first-ever CSL point.

== International career ==
Yao Haoyang has been called up to multiple Chinese national youth teams, including the U16, U17, U20, and U22 squads, and represented China in the U17 Asian Cup qualifiers.

In December 2025, Yao Haoyang was named in the China U22 national team training camp for the first time.

== Career statistics ==
=== Club ===
As of 19 November 2026

Appearances and goals by club, season and competition
Club	Season	League			National Cup		Continental		Other		Total	
Club	Season	Division	Apps	Goals	Apps	Goals	Apps	Goals	Apps	Goals	Apps	Goals
Hubei Istar	2023	China League Two	11	0	—	—	—		—		11	0
Yunnan Yukun (loan)	2024	China League One	28	0	1	0	—		—		28	0
Chongqing Tonglianglong (loan)	2025	China League One	17	0	—	—	—		—		17	0
Chongqing Tonglianglong	2026	Chinese Super League	29	0	1	0	—		—		29	0
Career total			85	0	2	0	—		—		87	0

== Honours ==
Yunnan Yukun

- China League One: 2024

Chongqing Tonglianglong

- China League One runner-up: 2025

Hubei

- National Games U20 gold medal: 2025

Individual

- China League One Best Goalkeeper: 2024
- China League One Team of the Year: 2024
