= Cheng Hui =

Cheng Hui may refer to:

- Cheng Hui (field hockey)
- Cheng Hui (footballer)
