= Chongqing Tonglianglong F.C. =

Association football club in China

Chongqing Tonglianglong
- Full name: Chongqing Tonglianglong Football Club 重庆铜梁龙足球俱乐部
- Founded: 23 December 2021; 4 years ago
- Ground: Longxing Football Stadium
- Capacity: 60,000
- Head coach: Liu Jianye
- League: Chinese Super League
- 2025: China League One, 2nd of 16 (promoted)
Home colours	Away colours	Third colours

Chongqing Tonglianglong Football Club (Chinese: 重庆铜梁龙足球俱乐部; pinyin: Chóngqìng Tóngliánglóng Zúqiú Jùlèbù) is a Chinese professional football club based in Chongqing, that competes in the Chinese Super League, the top tier of Chinese football. Chongqing Tonglianglong plays its home matches at the Longxing Football Stadium, located in the Liangjiang New Area of Chongqing.

== History ==
Chongqing Tonglianglong was founded on 23 December 2021. Their first squad was comprised mainly of youth players from Chongqing Furen High School. Upon the club's formation, they bore a variant of a Beijing Renhe badge due to a former connection between the two clubs, and entered the 2021 Chongqing Amateur Super League as Chongqing Youth (Chinese: 重庆青年), a fifth tier of Chinese football. The club then won the Chongqing Amateur Super League after beating Chongqing Linxuan on penalties, and were promoted to CMCL, the Chinese fourth division.

Chongqing Tongliangloong (Note: Spelled Tongliangloong in 2022.) were drawn into group D of the 2022 CMCL. After three games, Chongqing topped their group, with both them and Guangxi Lanhang progressing to the next stage. After a score of 13–0 on aggregate in the elimination round against Chongqing Benbiao, Tongliangloong were drawn into group B of the CMCL finals. After all seven games in the finals, Chongqing Tongliangloong secured promotion to China League Two after a 5–1 win against Jingchuan Wenhui on 14 November 2022, and qualified for a two-legged play-off tie to decide the outright winner of the season. After two 1–1 draws against Group A winners Yuxi Yukun Steel, Chongqing lost 4–2 on penalties to settle for second place.

In the 2023 China League Two season, Chongqing Tonglianglong finished top of the South Group claiming 11 wins out of 14, and were qualified for the promotion stage. With three gameweeks to spare in the promotion stage, on 17 September 2023, Chongqing Tonglianglong secured promotion to China League One with a 3–0 win over Hubei Istar. One gameweek later on 10 October 2023, Chongqing Tonglianglong were crowned champions of the 2023 China League Two, after second-placed Dalian Zhixing lost their match against Yunnan Yukun.

While in the 2023 Chinese FA Cup, Chongqing beat CMCL outfit Rizhao Yuqi 6–1 away from home in the first round, and knocked out China League One side Shijiazhuang Gongfu 3–0 in the second round, meaning they would host Chinese Super League club and neighbours Chengdu Rongcheng in the third round. On 23 June 2023, with a 0–0 draw inside 90 minutes, the tie had to be decided by penalties, in which Chongqing prevailed 4–2. After beating fellow China League Two side Nantong Haimen Codion 3–0, they faced Chinese Super League side Shanghai Shenhua in the quarter-finals on 30 August 2023, in which Chongqing lost 2–0, ending their CFA Cup run.

On 9 March 2024, Chongqing Tonglianglong hosted Liaoning Tieren in their season opener. A Yaki Yen goal ensured a 1–0 win for Chongqing Tonglianglong, the club's first ever in the division.

On 8 November 2025, after a 2–0 away league victory at Shanghai Jiading Huilong, Chongqing Tonglianglong secured promotion to the Chinese Super League for the first time in their history from next season with a second place finish in the 2025 China League One.

== Players ==
=== Current squad ===
As of July 2026

Note: Flags indicate national team as defined under FIFA eligibility rules; some limited exceptions apply. Players may hold more than one non-FIFA nationality.

No.	Pos.	Nation	Player
1	GK	CHN	Yao Haoyang
3	DF	CHN	Zhang Yingkai
4	DF	CHN	Yue Ruijie (on loan from Shandong Taishan)
6	DF	CHN	Jin Pengxiang
7	FW	CHN	Xiang Yuwang (captain)
8	MF	CHN	Li Zhenquan
9	FW	ROU	Alexandru Cîmpanu (on loan from Botoșani)
10	MF	FRA	Ibrahim Amadou
11	FW	BEL	Landry Dimata (on loan from Pafos)
15	MF	CHN	Chen Chunxin
16	MF	CHN	Zhang Zhixiong
17	MF	HKG	Ng Yu Hei
18	FW	CHN	Liang Weipeng

No.	Pos.	Nation	Player
19	FW	CHN	Du Yuezheng (on loan from Marbella)
21	MF	CHN	Liu Jiale
24	DF	CHN	Liu Mingshi
25	GK	CHN	Yerjet Yerzat
26	DF	CHN	He Xiaoqiang
27	MF	CHN	Wu Yongqiang
30	MF	CHN	Bai Yutao
31	GK	CHN	Wu Zitong
32	DF	CMR	Michael Ngadeu-Ngadjui
33	DF	BRA	Lucão
37	DF	CHN	Wei Suowei
38	DF	CHN	Ruan Qilong

=== Retired numbers ===
- 12 – "The twelfth man", dedication to fans

=== Out on loan ===
Note: Flags indicate national team as defined under FIFA eligibility rules; some limited exceptions apply. Players may hold more than one non-FIFA nationality.

No.	Pos.	Nation	Player
—	MF	CHN	Song Pan (at Suzhou Dongwu until 31 December 2026)
—	MF	CHN	Cheng Huatong (at Jiangxi Dingnan United until 31 December 2026)
—	DF	CHN	Wang Jie (at Shanxi Chongde Ronghai until 31 December 2026)

No.	Pos.	Nation	Player
—	MF	CHN	Ma Yujun (at Dalian K'un City until 31 December 2026)
—	GK	CHN	Zhang Haixuan (at Shanxi Chongde Ronghai until 31 December 2026)
—	DF	CHN	Wang Haowen (at Shanxi Chongde Ronghai until 31 December 2026)
—	DF	CHN	Huang Xuheng (at Qingdao Red Lions until 31 December 2026)

== Coaching staff ==
=== Management ===
Position	Staff
Head coach	(China) Liu Jianye
Assistant coach	(Spain) Nacho Fernández (China) Du Yu (China) Huang Xiyang
Fitness coach	(Spain) Robert Tendro
Goalkeeping coach	(China) Zhang Sipeng

=== Managerial history ===
As of 14 December 2025
Key: M = matches; W = matches won; D = matches drawn; L = matches lost
In this managerial records table, only fourth-tier matches or higher and domestic cup ties are counted.

Name	Nation	From	To	M	W	D	L	Win %
Lin Lin	China	January 2022	23 January 2024	41	30	6	5	73.2
Yu Yuanwei	China	23 January 2024	26 December 2024	14	6	5	3	42.9
Salva Suay	Spain	26 December 2024	22 September 2025	25	15	4	6	60.0
Chang Woe-ryong	South Korea	23 September 2025	12 December 2025	7	4	2	1	57.1
Liu Jianye	China	14 December 2025	Present	0	0	0	0	—

== Honours ==
League

- China League One
  - Runners-up: 2025
- China League Two
  - Champions: 2023
- CMCL
  - Runners-up: 2022
- Chongqing Amateur Super League
  - Champions: 2021

== Team record ==
All-time league rankings

As of the start from 2026 season.

Season	League										FA Cup	Super Cup	AFC		Top scorer(s) (Note: Includes goals scored in China League One, China League Two, CMCL, Chinese FA Cup.)		Stadium	Att./G (Note: Includes all competitive home matches.)
Season	Division	Pld	W	D	L	GF	GA	GD	Pts	Pos.	FA Cup	Super Cup	Competition	Pos.	Player(s)	Goals	Stadium	Att./G
2022	4 (Regionals)	3	2	1	0	10	0	10	7	2 (Note: Lost 4–2 on penalties in the CMCL final against Yuxi Yukun Steel.)	DNQ	DNQ	DNQ	DNQ	Xiang Yuwang	11		
2022	4 (Final round)	7	6	1	0	19	3	16	19	2	DNQ	DNQ	DNQ	DNQ	Xiang Yuwang	11		
2023	3	22	15	4	3	49	14	35	49	1	QF	DNQ	DNQ	DNQ	Xiang Yuwang	9	Tongliang Long Stadium	9,034
2024	2	30	13	11	6	42	25	17	50	5	QF	DNQ	DNQ	DNQ	Xiang Yuwang	15	Tongliang Long Stadium	9,324
2025	2	30	18	6	6	52	32	20	60	2	3R	DNQ	DNQ	DNQ	Xiang Yuwang	18	Tongliang Long Stadium	12,398
2026	1	30															Tongliang Long Stadium	

Key

	Chinese top-tier
	Chinese second-tier
	Chinese third-tier
	Chinese fourth-tier
W	Winners
RU	Runners-up
3	Third place
	Relegated

- Pld = Played
- W = Games won
- D = Games drawn
- L = Games lost
- F = Goals for
- A = Goals against
- Pts = Points
- Pos = Final position
- DNQ = Did not qualify
- DNE = Did not enter
- NH = Not Held
- – = Does Not Exist
- R1 = Round 1
- R2 = Round 2
- R3 = Round 3
- R4 = Round 4
- F = Final
- SF = Semi-finals
- QF = Quarter-finals
- R16 = Round of 16
- Group = Group stage
- GS2 = Second Group stage
- QR1 = First Qualifying Round
- QR2 = Second Qualifying Round
- QR3 = Third Qualifying Round
