= Chen Chunxin =

Chinese association football player

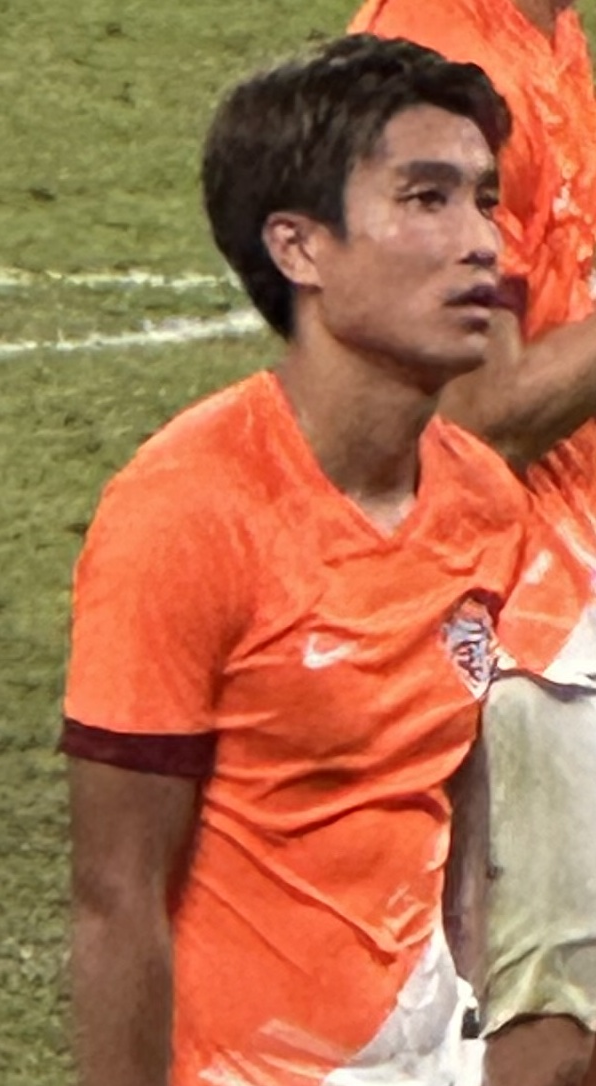
- Chen Chunxin in August 2024

Personal information
- Date of birth: 25 December 1997 (age 28)
- Place of birth: Fuzhou, Fujian, China
- Height: 1.81 m (5 ft 11 in)
- Position: Right winger

Team information
- Current team: Chongqing Tonglianglong
- Number: 15

Youth career
- –2020: Shanghai Port

Senior career*
Years	Team	Apps	(Gls)
2020–2022	Shanghai Port	20	(2)
2023–2025	Qingdao Hainiu	54	(1)
2026–	Chongqing Tonglianglong	19	(3)

International career
2017	China U20		
- * Club domestic league appearances and goals as of 19 November 2026

Chen Chunxin (simplified Chinese: 陈纯新; traditional Chinese: 陳純新; pinyin: Chén Chúnxīn; born 25 December 1997) is a Chinese footballer currently playing as a right winger for Chinese Super League club Chongqing Tonglianglong.

== Club career ==
Chen Chunxin was promoted to Chinese Super League side Shanghai Port first team squad in the 2020 Chinese Super League campaign. On 4 December 2020, he made his professional debut in a 2–0 defeat against Jeonbuk Hyundai Motors in a group game in the 2020 AFC Champions League. The following season he would establish himself as a squad player within the team and go on to score his first goal for the club in a league game on 15 August 2021 against Tianjin Jinmen Tiger in a 5-0 victory.

On 30 March 2023, Chen joined fellow top tier club Qingdao Hainiu for the start of the 2023 Chinese Super League season. On 24 January 2026, Chen announced his departure after the 2025 season.

On 31 January 2026, Chen joined fellow top tier club Chongqing Tonglianglong.

== Career statistics ==
As of match played 31 December 2025.

Appearances and goals by club, season and competition
Club	Season	League			Cup		Continental		Other		Total	
Club	Season	Division	Apps	Goals	Apps	Goals	Apps	Goals	Apps	Goals	Apps	Goals
Shanghai Port	2020	Chinese Super League	0	0	0	0	1	0	–		1	0
Shanghai Port	2021	Chinese Super League	8	1	3	0	0	0	–		11	1
Shanghai Port	2022	Chinese Super League	12	1	1	0	–		–		13	1
Shanghai Port	Total		20	2	4	0	1	0	0	0	25	2
Qingdao Hainiu	2023	Chinese Super League	22	1	3	0	–		–		25	1
Qingdao Hainiu	2024	Chinese Super League	24	0	2	0	–		–		26	0
Qingdao Hainiu	2025	Chinese Super League	8	0	1	0	–		–		9	0
Qingdao Hainiu	Total		54	1	6	0	0	0	0	0	60	1
Career total			74	3	10	0	1	0	0	0	85	3
