= Zhang Yingkai =

Chinese footballer (born 2004)

Personal information
- Date of birth: 28 February 2004 (age 22)
- Place of birth: Laizhou, Shandong, China
- Height: 1.82 m (6 ft 0 in)
- Position: Defender

Team information
- Current team: Chongqing Tonglianglong
- Number: 3

Youth career
- Shandong Taishan

Senior career*
Years	Team	Apps	(Gls)
2022–2024	Shandong Taishan	6	(0)
2024	Shandong Taishan B	21	(0)
2025–	Chongqing Tonglianglong	53	(1)

International career^{‡}
2018	China U14		
2026	China U23	2	(0)
- * Club domestic league appearances and goals as of 19 November 2026 ‡ National team caps and goals as of 1 July 2026

Zhang Yingkai (simplified Chinese: 张英凯; traditional Chinese: 張英凱; pinyin: Zhāng Yīngkǎi; born 28 February 2004) is a Chinese professional footballer who plays as a defender for Chinese Super League club Chongqing Tonglianglong.

== Early life and youth career ==
Zhang became interested in football at the age of 5 after watching Shandong Taishan player Guo Tianyu play. He chose to attend Jinan Dianliu No. 1 Primary School to pursue football training, where he was selected by coach Zhang Tao to join the Shandong Taishan youth academy.

== Club career ==
=== Shandong Taishan ===
In 2022, Zhang represented Shandong Taishan in the AFC Champions League, playing as a starting defender in all 6 group stage matches. In the 2023 season, he helped Shandong Taishan U21 team win the Chinese Football Association U-21 League championship and was selected to the tournament's Best XI. In the 2024 season, he played for Shandong Taishan B team in China League Two, making 20 appearances with 15 starts.

=== Chongqing Tonglianglong ===
On 27 January 2025, Chongqing Tonglianglong officially announced the signing of Zhang from Shandong Taishan. The transfer fee was reported to be approximately 199,000 euros (about 1.5 million RMB). He was assigned the number 3 jersey.

In the 2025 China League One season, Zhang made 25 appearances with 16 starts, scoring 1 goal and providing 1 assist. On 12 April 2025, in the 4th round match against Shaanxi Union, he provided an assist from the left flank for Xiang Yuwang's opening goal in a 2–1 victory. On 3 May 2025, in the 7th round match against Dingnan Ganlian, he scored a long-range goal to open the scoring in a 2–1 victory.

In the 2025 season, Chongqing Tonglianglong earned promotion to the Chinese Super League.

In the 2026 Chinese Super League season, Zhang made his debut in the opening round on 7 March 2026, starting in a 0–0 away draw against Tianjin Jinmen Tiger. He was substituted in the 89th minute.

== International career ==
In May 2018, Zhang was first called up to the China U14 national team as a starting centre-back for the Shandong Luneng 2004 age group.

On 28 May 2026, Zhang was named in the China U23 national team training squad for warm-up matches against Tajikistan U23 in preparation for the 2026 Asian Games. On 9 June 2026, he started in the U23 national team's 3–0 victory over Tajikistan U23 in Guiyang.

== Career statistics ==
=== Club ===
As of 1 July 2026

Appearances and goals by club, season and competition
Club	Season	League			National Cup		Continental		Other		Total	
Club	Season	Division	Apps	Goals	Apps	Goals	Apps	Goals	Apps	Goals	Apps	Goals
Shandong Taishan	2022	Chinese Super League	0	0	0	0	6	0	—		6	0
Shandong Taishan B	2024	China League Two	21	0	0	0	—		—		21	0
Chongqing Tonglianglong	2025	China League One	25	1	0	0	—		—		25	1
Chongqing Tonglianglong	2026	Chinese Super League	16	0	0	0	—		—		16	0
Career total			62	1	0	0	6	0	0	0	68	1

== Honours ==
Shandong Taishan U21

- Chinese Football Association U-21 League: 2023
