= 2023 China League Two =

China League Two
- Season: 2023
- Dates: 29 April – 22 October
- Champions: Chongqing Tonglianglong
- Promoted: Chongqing Tonglianglong; Dalian Zhixing; Yunnan Yukun; Qingdao Red Lions
- Matches: 176
- Goals: 431 (2.45 per match)
- Top goalscorer: Han Zilong (19 goals)
- Biggest home win: Tai'an Tiankuang 6–0 Shaoxing Shangyu Pterosaur (21 October 2023)
- Biggest away win: Jiangxi Dark Horse Junior 1–6 Chongqing Tonglianglong (25 May 2023); Shaoxing Shangyu Pterosaur 1–6 Yunnan Yukun (16 July 2023); Hubei Istar 0–5 Chongqing Tonglianglong (20 August 2023)
- Highest scoring: Jiangxi Dark Horse Junior 1–6 Chongqing Tonglianglong (25 May 2023); Hunan Billows 2–5 Yunnan Yukun (27 June 2023); Shaoxing Shangyu Pterosaur 1–6 Yunnan Yukun (16 July 2023)
- Longest winning run: 6 matches Chongqing Tonglianglong
- Longest unbeaten run: 16 matches Chongqing Tonglianglong
- Longest winless run: 18 matches Zibo Qisheng
- Longest losing run: 6 matches Zibo Qisheng
- Highest attendance: 20,468; Hunan Billows 1–1 Guangxi Lanhang (24 May 2023)
- Lowest attendance: 0 Zibo Qisheng 0–4 Dalian Zhixing (5 June 2023)
- Total attendance: 432,574
- Average attendance: 2,458

The 2023 Chinese Football Association League 2 season was the 34th season since its establishment in 1989.

== Clubs ==
=== Club changes ===
==== To League Two ====
Teams relegated from 2022 China League One

- Beijing BIT

Teams promoted from 2022 Chinese Champions League

- Yuxi Yukun
- Chongqing Tongliangloong
- Guangxi Lanhang
- Dalian Duxing

==== From League Two ====
Teams promoted to 2023 China League One

- Jinan Xingzhou
- Dandong Tengyue
- Yanbian Longding
- Dongguan United
- Wuxi Wugo

Teams relegated to 2023 Chinese Champions League

- Inner Mongolia Caoshangfei

Dissolved entries

- ~~Beijing BSU~~
- ~~Xinjiang Tianshan Leopard~~
- ~~Zhuhai Qin'ao~~

==== Name changes ====
- Chongqing Tongliangloong F.C. changed their name to Chongqing Tonglianglong in March 2023.
- Dalian Duxing F.C. changed their name to Dalian Zhixing in March 2023.
- Yuxi Yukun F.C. changed their name to Yunnan Yukun in March 2023.

=== Clubs information ===
Teams	Head Coach	City	Stadium	Capacity	2022 season
Beijing BIT ^{R}	(China) Yu Fei	Beijing	BIT Eastern Athletic Field	5,000	CL1, 18th
Tai'an Tiankuang	(China) Liu Jindong	Tai'an	Taishan Stadium	32,000	6th
Shaoxing Shangyu Pterosaur	(China) Wang Xiangquan	Shaoxing	Shangyu Stadium	16,000	8th
Shaoxing Shangyu Pterosaur	(China) Wang Xiangquan	Shaoxing	Jiaxing Stadium (Jiaxing)	35,000	8th
Qingdao Red Lions	(China) Sun Xinbo	Qingdao	Tiantai Stadium	20,525	9th
Qingdao Red Lions	(China) Sun Xinbo	Qingdao	Guzhenkou University City Sports Center	20,000	9th
Hubei Istar	(China) Gao Feng	Wuhan	Xinhua Road Sports Center	22,140	10th
Nantong Haimen Codion	(China) Lu Qiang	Nantong	Haimen Sports Centre	15,000	11th
Hainan Star	(China) Jiang Kun	Haikou	Haikou Mission Hills Football Training Base Stadium	500	12th
Jiangxi Dark Horse Junior	(China) Jiang Chen	Dingnan	Dingnan Youth Football Training Center	12,000	13th
Wuhan Jiangcheng	(China) Wei Dayong	Wuhan	Hankou Cultural Sports Centre	20,000	14th
Quanzhou Yassin	(China) Gao Daming	Jinjiang	Jinjiang Football Training Center	8,000	15th
Zibo Qisheng	(China) Li Yangyang	Zibo	Zibo Sports Center Stadium	45,000	16th
Yunnan Yukun ^{P}	(China) Shi Jun	Yuxi	Yuxi Plateau Sports Center Stadium	13,000	CMCL, 1st
Chongqing Tonglianglong ^{P}	(China) Lin Lin	Chongqing	Tongliang Long Stadium	15,000	CMCL, 2nd
Guangxi Lanhang ^{P}	(China) Xie Yuxin	Laibin	Liuzhou Sports Centre (Liuzhou)	35,000	CMCL, 3rd
Dalian Zhixing ^{P}	(China) Li Guoxu	Dalian	Jinzhou Stadium	30,776	CMCL, 4th
Hunan Billows	(China) Teng Renjun	Changsha	Loudi Sports Center (Loudi)	30,000	17th

=== Clubs locations ===
Location of teams in 2023 China League Two
North Group South Group

=== Managerial changes ===
Team	Outgoing manager	Manner of departure	Date of vacancy	Position in table	Incoming manager	Date of appointment
Hainan Star	(Japan) Tsutomu Takahata	Signed by Wuhan Three Towns	18 June 2023	5th in South Group	(China) Jiang Kun	19 June 2023
Yunnan Yukun	(China) Shi Jun	Resigned	5 September 2023	5th in Promotion stage	(China) Li Jinyu	7 September 2023

== First stage ==
=== North Group ===
==== League table ====
Pos	Team	Pld	W	D	L	GF	GA	GD	Pts	Qualification
1	Dalian Zhixing	14	9	4	1	20	7	+13	31 (Note: Dalian Zhixing finished ahead of Qingdao Red Lions on goal difference.)	Qualification for Promotion stage
2	Qingdao Red Lions	14	10	1	3	21	10	+11	31	Qualification for Promotion stage
3	Beijing BIT	14	5	5	4	11	10	+1	20	Qualification for Promotion stage
4	Hubei Istar	14	5	4	5	15	13	+2	19	Qualification for Promotion stage
5	Tai'an Tiankuang	14	4	6	4	16	17	−1	18	Qualification for Relegation stage
6	Nantong Haimen Codion	14	3	7	4	15	10	+5	16	Qualification for Relegation stage
7	Wuhan Jiangcheng	14	2	5	7	10	23	−13	11	Qualification for Relegation stage
8	Zibo Qisheng	14	0	4	10	6	24	−18	4	Qualification for Relegation stage

Source: Soccerway
Rules for classification:
- During season: 1) Points; 2) Goal difference; 3) Goals scored.
- After season: 1) Points; 2) Head-to-head points; 3) Head-to-head goal difference; 4) Head-to-head goals scored; 5) Scores of the weight ratio of the reserve league and youth leagues.
  Notes:

==== Results ====
Home \ Away	BIT	DLZ	HBI	NHC	QRL	TAT	WHJ	ZBQ
Beijing BIT	—	1–2	1–0	1–0	1–2	2–0	1–0	1–0
Dalian Zhixing	2–0	—	1–0	1–0	2–1	1–0	0–0	1–1
Hubei Istar	0–0	0–1	—	1–1	2–1	4–1	3–1	2–1
Nantong Haimen Codion	0–0	2–2	0–0	—	0–1	1–1	1–1	2–0
Qingdao Red Lions	2–1	1–0	2–0	1–0	—	1–2	1–0	2–0
Tai'an Tiankuang	1–1	0–0	2–1	1–1	2–2	—	4–1	1–1
Wuhan Jiangcheng	0–0	1–3	1–1	0–4	0–3	1–0	—	2–2
Zibo Qisheng	1–1	0–4	0–1	0–3	0–1	0–1	0–2	—

Source: Soccerway
Legend: Blue = home team win; Yellow = draw; Red = away team win.
For upcoming matches, an "a" indicates there is an article about the rivalry between the two participants.

==== Positions by round ====
To preserve chronological evolvements, any postponed matches are not included to the round at which they were originally scheduled, but added to the full round they were played immediately afterwards. For example, if a match is scheduled for round 7, but then played between rounds 8 and 9, it will be added to the standings for round 8.

Team ╲ Round	1	2	3	4	5	6	7	8	9	10	11	12	13	14
Dalian Zhixing	5	3	2	3	2	1	1	1	1	1	1	1	1	1
Qingdao Red Lions	2	4	3	2	1	2	2	2	2	2	2	2	2	2
Beijing BIT	1	2	1	1	3	3	3	3	3	3	3	4	3	3
Hubei Istar	7	8	7	8	7	8	7	6	7	6	6	6	5	4
Tai'an Tiankuang	3	1	4	4	6	5	5	4	4	4	4	3	4	5
Nantong Haimen Codion	8	7	8	5	5	4	4	5	5	5	5	5	6	6
Wuhan Jiangcheng	6	6	5	6	4	6	6	7	6	7	7	7	7	7
Zibo Qisheng	4	5	6	7	8	7	8	8	8	8	8	8	8	8

Qualification for Promotion stage
Qualification for Relegation stage

Source: Soccerway

==== Results by match played ====
Team ╲ Round	1	2	3	4	5	6	7	8	9	10	11	12	13	14
Beijing BIT	W	D	W	W	L	D	L	D	W	D	D	L	W	L
Dalian Zhixing	D	W	W	D	W	W	W	W	W	D	W	D	L	W
Hubei Istar	L	L	D	L	D	L	W	D	L	W	W	D	W	W
Nantong Haimen Codion	L	D	L	W	D	W	D	L	L	D	W	D	D	D
Qingdao Red Lions	W	L	W	W	W	L	W	W	D	W	L	W	W	W
Tai'an Tiankuang	D	W	L	D	L	W	D	W	D	D	L	W	L	D
Wuhan Jiangcheng	D	D	D	L	W	L	L	L	W	L	D	L	D	L
Zibo Qisheng	D	D	L	L	L	D	L	L	L	L	L	D	L	L

Source: Soccerway
W = Win; D = Draw; L = Loss

=== South Group ===
==== League table ====
Pos	Team	Pld	W	D	L	GF	GA	GD	Pts	Qualification
1	Chongqing Tonglianglong	14	11	3	0	34	9	+25	36	Qualification for Promotion stage
2	Guangxi Lanhang	14	8	4	2	15	9	+6	28	Qualification for Promotion stage
3	Yunnan Yukun	14	8	3	3	33	11	+22	27	Qualification for Promotion stage
4	Jiangxi Dark Horse Junior	14	5	2	7	11	21	−10	17	Qualification for Promotion stage
5	Shaoxing Shangyu Pterosaur	14	4	1	9	14	30	−16	13 (Note: Shaoxing Shangyu Pterosaur finished ahead of Hunan Billows on head-to-head goal difference: Shaoxing Shangyu Pterosaur 4–2 Hunan Billows, Hunan Billows 3–2 Shaoxing Shangyu Pterosaur.)	Qualification for Relegation stage
6	Hunan Billows	14	3	4	7	17	28	−11	13	Qualification for Relegation stage
7	Quanzhou Yassin	14	3	3	8	14	21	−7	12	Qualification for Relegation stage
8	Hainan Star	14	3	2	9	10	19	−9	11	Qualification for Relegation stage

Source: Soccerway
Rules for classification:
- During season: 1) Points; 2) Goal difference; 3) Goals scored.
- After season: 1) Points; 2) Head-to-head points; 3) Head-to-head goal difference; 4) Head-to-head goals scored; 5) Scores of the weight ratio of the reserve league and youth leagues.
  Notes:

==== Results ====
Home \ Away	CQT	GXL	HNS	HNB	JXJ	QZY	SSP	YNY
Chongqing Tonglianglong	—	2–0	2–1	4–1	3–1	2–0	2–0	1–1
Guangxi Lanhang	1–1	—	2–1	1–0	1–2	0–0	1–0	2–1
Hainan Star	1–2	0–1	—	0–0	0–3	2–1	0–0	3–1
Hunan Billows	1–2	1–1	1–0	—	3–0	1–5	3–2	2–5
Jiangxi Dark Horse Junior	1–6	0–1	1–0	1–1	—	1–0	1–0	0–3
Quanzhou Yassin	1–3	0–1	1–2	1–1	0–0	—	2–0	1–0
Shaoxing Shangyu Pterosaur	0–4	0–2	2–0	4–2	1–0	4–2	—	1–6
Yunnan Yukun	0–0	1–1	2–0	2–0	2–0	4–0	5–0	—

Source: Soccerway
Legend: Blue = home team win; Yellow = draw; Red = away team win.
For upcoming matches, an "a" indicates there is an article about the rivalry between the two participants.

==== Positions by round ====
To preserve chronological evolvements, any postponed matches are not included to the round at which they were originally scheduled, but added to the full round they were played immediately afterwards. For example, if a match is scheduled for round 7, but then played between rounds 8 and 9, it will be added to the standings for round 8.

Team ╲ Round	1	2	3	4	5	6	7	8	9	10	11	12	13	14
Chongqing Tonglianglong	1	3	3	2	1	1	1	1	1	1	1	1	1	1
Guangxi Lanhang	3	1	4	4	3	3	3	3	3	2	2	2	2	2
Yunnan Yukun	2	4	2	1	2	2	2	2	2	3	3	3	3	3
Jiangxi Dark Horse Junior	4	2	1	3	4	4	4	4	4	4	4	4	4	4
Shaoxing Shangyu Pterosaur	6	8	5	6	5	5	8	5	6	6	7	7	8	5
Hunan Billows	7	5	6	7	7	6	6	7	8	8	8	8	7	6
Quanzhou Yassin	8	6	7	8	8	8	7	8	5	5	5	5	5	7
Hainan Star	5	7	8	5	6	7	5	6	7	7	6	6	6	8

Qualification for Promotion stage
Qualification for Relegation stage

Source: Soccerway

==== Results by match played ====
Team ╲ Round	1	2	3	4	5	6	7	8	9	10	11	12	13	14
Chongqing Tonglianglong	W	D	W	W	W	W	W	W	D	W	W	W	W	D
Guangxi Lanhang	W	W	L	D	W	D	L	W	W	W	W	D	W	D
Hainan Star	L	L	L	W	L	L	W	L	L	D	W	L	D	L
Hunan Billows	L	D	L	D	L	W	D	L	L	L	L	W	D	W
Jiangxi Dark Horse Junior	W	W	W	L	D	L	D	L	W	L	L	W	L	L
Quanzhou Yassin	L	D	L	L	D	D	W	L	W	W	L	L	L	L
Shaoxing Shangyu Pterosaur	L	L	W	L	W	L	L	W	L	D	L	L	L	W
Yunnan Yukun	W	D	W	W	L	W	L	W	D	L	W	D	W	W

Source: Soccerway
W = Win; D = Draw; L = Loss

== Promotion stage ==
=== League table ===
Pos	Team	Pld	W	D	L	GF	GA	GD	Pts	Promotion
1	Chongqing Tonglianglong (C, P)	22	15	4	3	49	14	+35	49	Promotion to League One
2	Dalian Zhixing (P)	22	14	5	3	30	12	+18	47	Promotion to League One
3	Yunnan Yukun (P)	22	13	6	3	47	17	+30	45	Promotion to League One
4	Qingdao Red Lions (P)	22	13	5	4	30	14	+16	44	Promotion to League One
5	Guangxi Lanhang	22	11	5	6	20	19	+1	38	
6	Beijing BIT	22	7	6	9	17	25	−8	27	
7	Jiangxi Dark Horse Junior	22	7	4	11	16	30	−14	25	
8	Hubei Istar	22	6	5	11	20	28	−8	23	

Source: Soccerway
Rules for classification:
- During season: 1) Points; 2) Goal difference; 3) Goals scored.
- After season: 1) Points; 2) Head-to-head points; 3) Head-to-head goal difference; 4) Head-to-head goals scored; 5) Scores of the weight ratio of the reserve league and youth leagues.
  (C) Champions; (P) Promoted

=== Results ===
Home \ Away	BIT	CQT	DLZ	GXL	HBI	JXJ	QRL	YNY
Beijing BIT		2–0		0–1		0–0		0–3
Chongqing Tonglianglong	5–0		2–1		3–0		0–0	
Dalian Zhixing		1–0		2–0		2–0		0–1
Guangxi Lanhang	1–3		0–1		1–0		1–1	
Hubei Istar		0–5		0–1		2–0		2–3
Jiangxi Dark Horse Junior	2–0		1–2		1–0		0–0	
Qingdao Red Lions		1–0		3–0		3–1		1–1
Yunnan Yukun	3–1		1–1		1–1		1–0	

Source: Soccerway
Legend: Blue = home team win; Yellow = draw; Red = away team win.
For upcoming matches, an "a" indicates there is an article about the rivalry between the two participants.

=== Positions by round ===
To preserve chronological evolvements, any postponed matches are not included to the round at which they were originally scheduled, but added to the full round they were played immediately afterwards. For example, if a match is scheduled for round 7, but then played between rounds 8 and 9, it will be added to the standings for round 8.

Team ╲ Round	1	2	3	4	5	6	7	8
Chongqing Tonglianglong	1	1	1	1	1	1	1	1
Dalian Zhixing	2	2	2	2	2	2	2	2
Yunnan Yukun	5	5	5	5	4	4	3	3
Qingdao Red Lions	3	4	3	3	3	3	4	4
Guangxi Lanhang	4	3	4	4	5	5	5	5
Beijing BIT	6	6	8	8	7	6	6	6
Jiangxi Dark Horse Junior	8	8	6	7	8	8	8	7
Hubei Istar	7	7	7	6	6	7	7	8

Leader and promotion to League One
Promotion to League One

Source: Soccerway

=== Results by match played ===
Team ╲ Round	1	2	3	4	5	6	7	8
Beijing BIT	L	L	L	L	W	W	D	L
Chongqing Tonglianglong	W	W	L	W	W	L	D	L
Dalian Zhixing	W	D	W	L	W	L	W	W
Guangxi Lanhang	W	W	L	D	L	W	L	L
Hubei Istar	L	L	D	W	L	L	L	L
Jiangxi Dark Horse Junior	L	D	W	L	L	L	D	W
Qingdao Red Lions	D	D	W	D	L	W	D	W
Yunnan Yukun	D	D	D	W	W	W	W	W

Source: Soccerway
W = Win; D = Draw; L = Loss

== Relegation stage ==
=== League table ===
Pos	Team	Pld	W	D	L	GF	GA	GD	Pts	
9	Nantong Haimen Codion	22	9	7	6	39	20	+19	34	
10	Tai'an Tiankuang	22	9	7	6	39	26	+13	34	
11	Wuhan Jiangcheng	22	6	7	9	26	35	−9	25	Dissolved
12	Hainan Star	22	7	4	11	21	27	−6	25	
13	Hunan Billows	22	7	4	11	26	46	−20	25	
14	Quanzhou Yassin	22	5	5	12	21	34	−13	20	
15	Shaoxing Shangyu Pterosaur	22	5	2	15	24	55	−31	17	
16	Zibo Qisheng	22	1	6	15	7	30	−23	9	Dissolved

Source: Soccerway
Rules for classification:
- During season: 1) Points; 2) Goal difference; 3) Goals scored.
- After season: 1) Points; 2) Head-to-head points; 3) Head-to-head goal difference; 4) Head-to-head goals scored; 5) Scores of the weight ratio of the reserve league and youth leagues.

=== Results ===
Home \ Away	HNS	HNB	NHC	QZY	SSP	TAT	WHJ	ZBQ
Hainan Star			3–1			0–2	4–1	1–0
Hunan Billows			2–1			1–6	1–2	2–0
Nantong Haimen Codion	2–0	5–0		2–1	4–1			
Quanzhou Yassin			1–5			1–2	0–2	0–0
Shaoxing Shangyu Pterosaur			2–4			2–4	2–2	0–1
Tai'an Tiankuang	1–2	1–2		1–1	6–0			
Wuhan Jiangcheng	1–1	3–0		1–2	4–2			
Zibo Qisheng	0–0	0–1		0–1	0–1			

Source: Soccerway
Legend: Blue = home team win; Yellow = draw; Red = away team win.
For upcoming matches, an "a" indicates there is an article about the rivalry between the two participants.

=== Positions by round ===
To preserve chronological evolvements, any postponed matches are not included to the round at which they were originally scheduled, but added to the full round they were played immediately afterwards. For example, if a match is scheduled for round 7, but then played between rounds 8 and 9, it will be added to the standings for round 8.

Team ╲ Round	1	2	3	4	5	6	7	8
Nantong Haimen Codion	10	9	9	9	9	9	9	9
Tai'an Tiankuang	9	10	10	10	10	10	10	10
Wuhan Jiangcheng	12	13	14	12	11	11	11	11
Hainan Star	15	15	15	15	13	13	13	12
Hunan Billows	13	12	11	11	12	12	12	13
Quanzhou Yassin	14	14	13	14	15	15	14	14
Shaoxing Shangyu Pterosaur	11	11	12	13	14	14	15	15
Zibo Qisheng	16	16	16	16	16	16	16	16

Source: Soccerway

=== Results by match played ===
Team ╲ Round	1	2	3	4	5	6	7	8
Hainan Star	L	L	D	W	W	W	W	D
Hunan Billows	L	W	W	W	L	W	L	L
Nantong Haimen Codion	W	W	W	L	W	L	W	W
Quanzhou Yassin	L	D	W	L	L	L	D	W
Shaoxing Shangyu Pterosaur	W	D	L	L	L	L	L	L
Tai'an Tiankuang	W	D	L	W	L	W	W	W
Wuhan Jiangcheng	W	D	D	W	W	W	L	L
Zibo Qisheng	L	L	L	L	W	L	D	D

Source: Soccerway
W = Win; D = Draw; L = Loss

== Goalscorers ==
Rank	Player	Club	Goals
1	(China) Han Zilong	Yunnan Yukun	19
2	(China) Yan Ge	Nantong Haimen Codion	13
3	(China) Xiang Yuwang	Chongqing Tonglianglong	9
4	(China) Zhao Xuebin	Dalian Zhixing	8
4	(China) Chen Jiaqi	Chongqing Tonglianglong	8
4	(China) Meng Zhen	Shaoxing Shangyu Pterosaur	8
7	(China) Liu Yuhao	Yunnan Yukun	7
7	(China) Zhou Ziheng	Guangxi Lanhang	7
7	(China) Wu Xingyu	Tai'an Tiankuang	7
10	(China) Zhang Xianbing	Shaoxing Shangyu Pterosaur	6
10	(China) Tian Xiangyu	Chongqing Tonglianglong	6
10	(China) Chen Ji	Wuhan Jiangcheng	6
10	(China) Huang Xiyang	Chongqing Tonglianglong	6
10	(China) Guo Yongchu	Hunan Billows	6

=== Hat-tricks ===
Player	For	Against	Result	Date
(China) Han Zilong	Yunnan Yukun	Shaoxing Shangyu Pterosaur	5-0 (H)	25 May 2023
(China) Meng Zhen	Shaoxing Shangyu Pterosaur	Quanzhou Yassin	4-2 (H)	5 August 2023
(China) Yan Ge	Nantong Haimen Codion	Shaoxing Shangyu Pterosaur	4-2 (A)	14 October 2023

== Awards ==
=== Player of the Round ===
The following players were named the Player of the Round.

Round	Player	Club	References
1	(China) Han Zilong	Yunnan Yukun	
2	(China) Sun Bo	Dalian Zhixing	
3	(China) Sun Ya	Shaoxing Shangyu Pterosaur	
4	(China) Han Zilong	Yunnan Yukun	
5	(China) Zhao Xuebin	Dalian Zhixing	
6	(China) Wang Xiao	Yunnan Yukun	
7	(China) Huang Xiyang	Chongqing Tonglianglong	
8	(China) Wang Xiao	Yunnan Yukun	
9	(China) Li Yalun	Quanzhou Yassin	
10	(China) Huang Kaijun	Hubei Istar	
11	(China) Shi Letian	Hainan Star	
12	(China) Song Pan	Chongqing Tonglianglong	
13	(China) Wangzi Ankang	Hubei Istar	
14	(China) Meng Zhen	Shaoxing Shangyu Pterosaur	
15	(China) Xie Wenxi	Tai'an Tiankuang	
16	(China) Meng Zhen	Shaoxing Shangyu Pterosaur	
17	(China) Qeysar Tursun	Hunan Billows	
18	(China) Xiang Yuwang	Chongqing Tonglianglong	
19	(China) Han Zilong	Yunnan Yukun	

=== Monthly awards ===
Month	Player of the Month		Manager of the Month		Young Player of the Month	
Month	Player	Club	Manager	Club	Player	Club
May	(China) Han Zilong	Yunnan Yukun	(China) Yu Fei	Beijing BIT	(China) Xiang Yuwang	Chongqing Tonglianglong
June	(China) Chen Jiaqi	Chongqing Tonglianglong	(China) Li Guoxu	Dalian Zhixing	(China) Xiang Yuwang	Chongqing Tonglianglong
July	(China) Zhou Ziheng	Guangxi Lanhang	(China) Xie Yuxin	Guangxi Lanhang	(China) Xiang Yuwang	Chongqing Tonglianglong
August	(China) Meng Zhen	Shaoxing Shangyu Pterosaur	(China) Lin Lin	Chongqing Tonglianglong	(China) Xiang Yuwang	Chongqing Tonglianglong

== League attendance ==
Pos	Team	Total	High	Low	Average	Change
1	Yunnan Yukun	101,903	9,598	8,659	9,264	n/a
2	Chongqing Tonglianglong	94,498	9,987	5,856	8,591	n/a
3	Hunan Billows	93,282	20,468	1,218	8,480	n/a
4	Tai'an Tiankuang	32,705	4,869	1,180	2,973	n/a
5	Jiangxi Dark Horse Junior	24,040	4,956	356	2,185	n/a
6	Dalian Zhixing	18,028	6,788	313	1,639	n/a
7	Qingdao Red Lions	17,775	5,066	508	1,616	n/a
8	Nantong Haimen Codion	15,435	4,886	19	1,403	n/a
9	Quanzhou Yassin	10,743	2,388	383	977	n/a
10	Guangxi Lanhang	8,112	1,508	523	737	n/a
11	Hubei Istar	3,508	508	118	319	n/a
12	Beijing BIT	3,323	460	219	302	n/a
13	Wuhan Jiangcheng	3,128	665	135	284	n/a
14	Shaoxing Shangyu Pterosaur	3,108	1,052	39	283	n/a
15	Hainan Star	1,926	262	91	175	n/a
16	Zibo Qisheng	1,060	568	0	96	n/a
	League total	432,574	20,468	0	2,458	n/a
