= Longxing Football Stadium =

Football stadium in Chongqing, China

Chongqing Longxing Football Stadium
- 重庆龙兴足球场
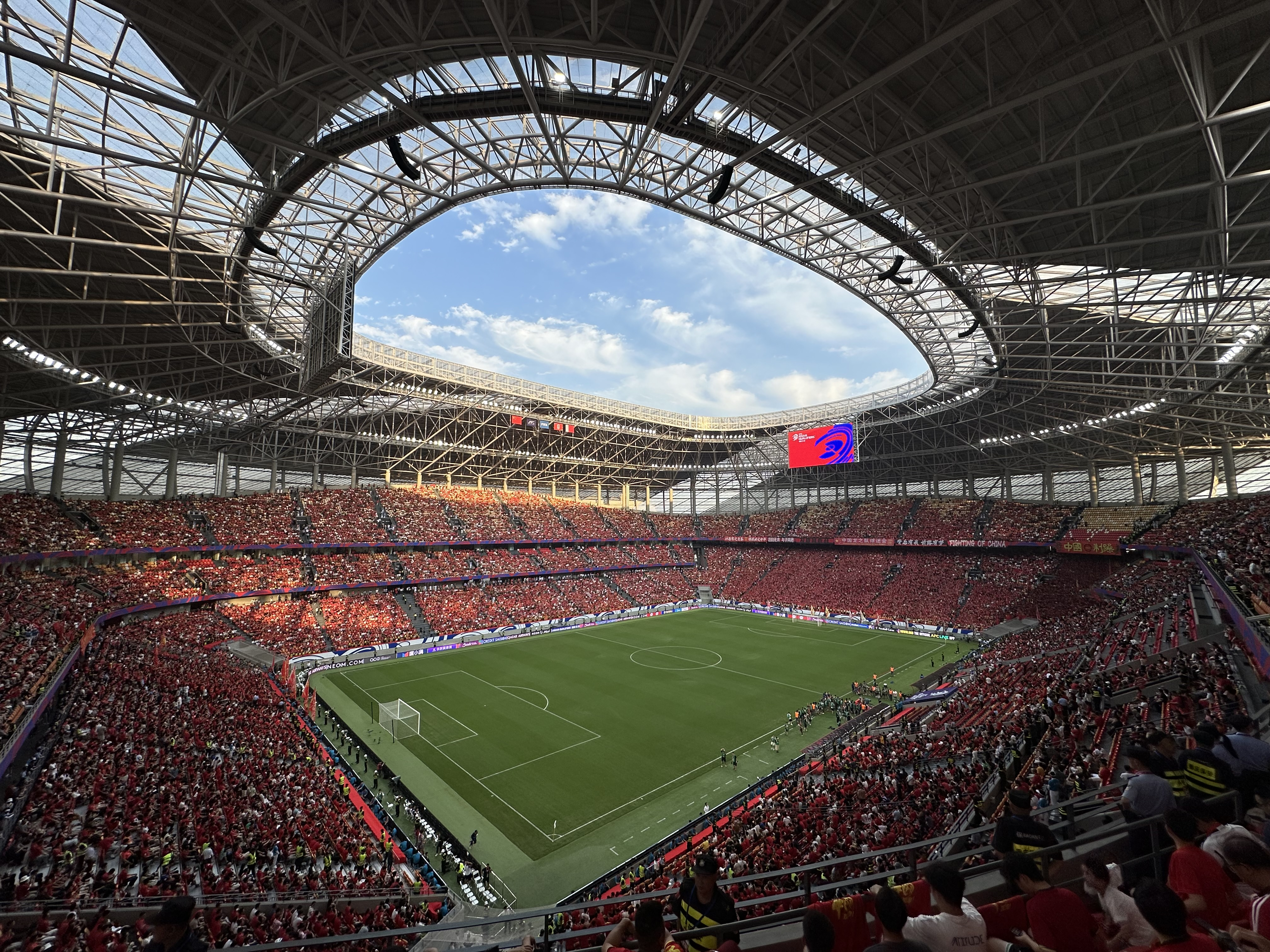
- Interactive map of Chongqing Longxing Football Stadium
- Location: Liangjiang New Area, Chongqing, China
- Coordinates: 29°42′27″N 106°47′44″E
- Capacity: 60,000
- Record attendance: 56,246 (Chongqing Tonglianglong vs Beijing Guoan, 30 May 2026)
- Public transit: Line 4 at Longxing

Construction
- Groundbreaking: 2020
- Opened: 2022

Tenants
- China (select matches); Chongqing Tonglianglong (2026–present)

The Chongqing Longxing Football Stadium (Chinese: 重庆龙兴足球场; pinyin: Chóngqìng Lóngxīng Zúqiúchǎng) is a football stadium in Chongqing, China, with capacity for 60,000 spectators.

On 4 November 2023, Chongqing Tonglianglong F.C. won a friendly against a Uruguay U-20 squad by penalty shootout after a 1–1 draw.
