= Yue Ruijie =

Chinese footballer

Personal information
- Date of birth: 20 November 2007 (age 19)
- Place of birth: Jinan, Shandong, China
- Height: 1.88 m (6 ft 2 in)
- Position: Centre-back

Team information
- Current team: Chongqing Tonglianglong
- Number: 4

Youth career
- Shandong Taishan

Senior career*
Years	Team	Apps	(Gls)
2024–2025	Shandong Taishan	0	(0)
2025	→ Shandong Taishan B (res.)	6	(0)
2026–	Chongqing Tonglianglong	12	(0)

International career^{‡}
2025–	China U19	5	(0)
- * Club domestic league appearances and goals as of 19 November 2026 ‡ National team caps and goals as of 24 June 2026

Yue Ruijie (simplified Chinese: 岳瑞杰; traditional Chinese: 岳瑞傑; pinyin: Yuè Ruìjié; born 20 November 2007) is a Chinese professional footballer who plays as a centre-back for Chinese Super League club Chongqing Tonglianglong.

== Early life and youth career ==
Yue was born on 20 November 2007 in Jinan, Shandong. He came through the youth academy of Shandong Taishan.

== Club career ==
=== Shandong Taishan ===
On 15 July 2024, Yue was promoted to the Shandong Taishan first team along with teammates Wang Yuxuan, Yang Yang, and Hao Fubo. He participated in first team training and preparations for the Chinese Super League and Chinese FA Cup.

=== Chongqing Tonglianglong ===
On 1 February 2026, Yue joined Chongqing Tonglianglong on a one-year loan from Shandong Taishan. He was assigned the number 4 jersey. As of June 2026, he had made 1 appearance for the club in the Chinese Super League, with 1 minute of playing time.

== International career ==
Yue has been called up to the China U19 national team on multiple occasions. In May 2026, he was named in the squad for the U19 national team's third training camp of 2026, held in Shanghai and the Provence-Alpes-Côte d'Azur region of France from 25 May to 15 June 2026, to participate in the 52nd Maurice Revello Tournament (Toulon Tournament). On 31 May 2026, he captained the team in the opening match of the tournament, a 1–0 victory over Saudi Arabia U21, playing the full 90 minutes.

== Honours ==
Shandong Taishan U17

- Chinese Football Association U17 League: 2023

Shandong

- National Youth Games men's football: 2024

== Career statistics ==
=== Club ===
As of 24 June 2026

Appearances and goals by club, season and competition
Club	Season	League			National Cup		Continental		Other		Total	
Club	Season	Division	Apps	Goals	Apps	Goals	Apps	Goals	Apps	Goals	Apps	Goals
Shandong Taishan	2024	Chinese Super League	0	0	0	0	—		—		0	0
Shandong Taishan B	2025	China League Two	6	0	0	0	—		—		6	0
Chongqing Tonglianglong	2026	Chinese Super League	1	0	0	0	—		—		1	0
Career total			7	0	0	0	0	0	0	0	7	0
