= Wei Suowei =

Chinese football player (born 2005)

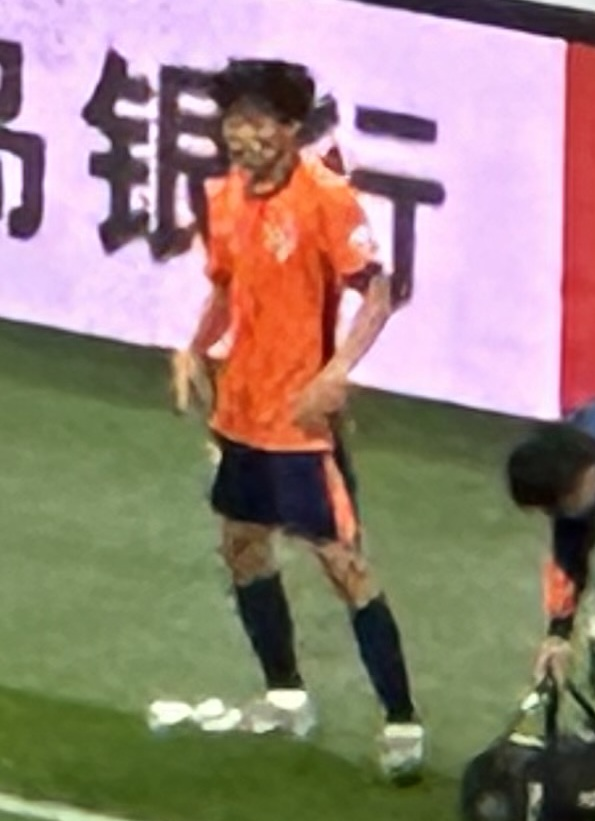
- Wei Suowei in May 2025

Personal information
- Date of birth: 20 May 2005 (age 21)
- Place of birth: Chongzuo, Guangxi, China
- Height: 1.77 m (5 ft 10 in)
- Position: Defender

Team information
- Current team: Chongqing Tonglianglong
- Number: 37

Youth career
- 2016–2022: Guangzhou FC

Senior career*
Years	Team	Apps	(Gls)
2022–2024	Guangzhou FC	7	(0)
2024	→ Hubei Istar (loan)	25	(1)
2025	Qingdao Hainiu	14	(0)
2026–	Chongqing Tonglianglong	19	(0)
- * Club domestic league appearances and goals as of 19 November 2026

Wei Suowei (Chinese: 韦所为; born 20 May 2005) is a Chinese footballer currently playing as a defender for Chongqing Tonglianglong.

== Club career ==
Born in Chongzuo, Guangxi, Wei and his twin brother, Zixian, joined Guangzhou Evergrande Taobao in 2016. In making his debut for Guangzhou, he became the first person from Chongzuo to play in the Chinese Super League.

== Career statistics ==
=== Club ===
As of 31 December 2023.

Club	Season	League			Cup		Continental		Other		Total	
Club	Season	Division	Apps	Goals	Apps	Goals	Apps	Goals	Apps	Goals	Apps	Goals
Guangzhou FC	2022	Chinese Super League	6	0	0	0	0	0	–		6	0
Guangzhou FC	2023	China League One	1	0	0	0	–		–		1	0
Guangzhou FC	Total		7	0	2	0	0	0	0	0	7	0
Hubei Istar (loan)	2024	China League Two	0	0	0	0	–		–		0	0
Career total			7	0	0	0	0	0	0	0	7	0
