= Wu Zitong =

Chinese association football goalkeeper

Personal information
- Date of birth: 27 April 2007 (age 19)
- Height: 1.87 m (6 ft 2 in)
- Position: Goalkeeper

Team information
- Current team: Chongqing Tonglianglong
- Number: 31

Youth career
- Evergrande Football School

Senior career*
Years	Team	Apps	(Gls)
2024	Guangzhou FC	4	(0)
2025–	Chongqing Tonglianglong	14	(0)

International career^{‡}
2025–	China U19		
- * Club domestic league appearances and goals as of 20 October 2026 ‡ National team caps and goals as of 20 October 2026

Wu Zitong (simplified Chinese: 吴梓桐; traditional Chinese: 吳梓桐; pinyin: Wú Zǐtóng; born 27 April 2007) is a Chinese professional footballer who plays as a goalkeeper for Chinese Super League club Chongqing Tonglianglong.

== Early life and youth career ==
Wu Zitong was born on 27 April 2007. He began his career at Evergrande Football School. In 2020, he was named the best goalkeeper of the Evergrande Xingyao Cup U13 tournament.

== Club career ==
=== Guangzhou ===
In February 2024, Wu Zitong entered the first team of Guangzhou FC. On 16 June 2024, he made his professional debut for Guangzhou against Yanbian Longding. He made four league appearances for Guangzhou during the 2024 season.

=== Chongqing Tonglianglong ===
On 26 January 2025, Chongqing Tonglianglong officially announced the signing of Wu Zitong. He joined on a free transfer. During the 2025 season in August, he made nine league appearances for the club.

== International career ==
In August 2025, Wu Zitong was called up to the China U18 national team for a training camp. In September 2026, he was named in the China U19 squad for a training camp. In October 2026, he was included in the China U19 squad for friendly matches against Indonesia.

== Career statistics ==
=== Club ===
As of 20 October 2026

Appearances and goals by club, season and competition
Club	Season	League			National Cup		Continental		Other		Total	
Club	Season	Division	Apps	Goals	Apps	Goals	Apps	Goals	Apps	Goals	Apps	Goals
Guangzhou FC	2024	China League One	4	0	0	0	—		—		4	0
Chongqing Tonglianglong	2025	China League One	13	0	0	0	—		—		13	0
Chongqing Tonglianglong	2026	Chinese Super League	1	0	1	0	—		—		2	0
Career total			18	0	1	0	0	0	0	0	19	0

== Honours ==
Chongqing Tonglianglong

- China League One runner-up: 2025
