= Zhang Zhixiong =

Chinese footballer (born 2006)

Personal information
- Full name: Zhang Zhixiong
- Date of birth: 27 September 2006 (age 20)
- Place of birth: Yuanling County, Hunan, China
- Height: 1.74 m (5 ft 9 in)
- Position: Defensive midfielder

Team information
- Current team: Chongqing Tonglianglong
- Number: 16

Youth career
- 2016–2024: Guangzhou Football School

Senior career*
Years	Team	Apps	(Gls)
2024	Guangzhou FC	19	(3)
2025–	Chongqing Tongliang Long	53	(7)

International career^{‡}
2025	China U20	2	(0)
- * Club domestic league appearances and goals as of 19 November 2026 ‡ National team caps and goals as of 16 February 2025

Zhang Zhixiong (Chinese: 张志雄; born 27 September 2006) is a Chinese professional footballer who plays as a midfielder for Chongqing Tonglianglong in the China Super League. He attended the Guangzhou Evergrande Youth Academy.

== Early career ==
Zhang Zhixiong joined the Guangzhou Evergrande Football School in 2016 as a self-funded trainee in the ordinary team. After two years, he entered the 06-1 elite squad. In February 2024, he was promoted to Guangzhou FC's senior team. During the 2024 season, he made 19 appearances and scored 3 goals in China League One.

== Club career ==
Zhang made his professional debut on 20 July 2024 in a 3–0 victory over Foshan Nanshi, scoring his first career goal with a header in the 9th minute. In October 2024, he scored a notable header against Guangxi FC. In January 2025, he transferred to Chongqing Tongliang Long following Guangzhou FC's withdrawal from professional leagues.

== International career ==
Zhang was selected for the China U20 national team in 2025, participating in the U20 Asian Cup. In a group-stage match against Qatar, he made a late substitute appearance and contributed to disrupting the opposition's defense.

== Career statistics ==
As of 16 February 2025

Club	Season	League	Apps	Goals
Guangzhou FC	2024	China League One	19	3
Chongqing Tongliang Long	2025–	Chinese Super League	0	0

Sources: Club reports and match data
