= Guangxi Lanhang F.C. =

Association football club in China

Guangxi Lanhang
- Full name: Guangxi Lanhang Football Club 广西蓝航足球俱乐部
- Founded: January 2021; 5 years ago
- Ground: Baise Sports Center Stadium
- Capacity: 20,000
- Chairman: Liang Xianchun
- Manager: Li Yunjing
- League: Chinese Champions League
- 2025: China League Two, 24th of 24 (relegated)
Home colours	Away colours

Guangxi Lanhang Football Club (simplified Chinese: 广西蓝航足球俱乐部; traditional Chinese: 廣西藍航足球俱樂部; pinyin: Guǎngxī Lánháng Zúqiú Jùlèbù) is a Chinese professional football club based in Laibin, Guangxi, that competes in the Chinese Champions League (CMCL), the fourth tier of Chinese football. Despite being based in Laibin, Guangxi Lanhang plays its home matches at the Baise Sports Center Stadium, located within Baise, Guangxi.

== History ==
Guangxi Lanhang was formed in January 2021 as part of the football branch for the Guangxi Lantian Aviation Technical College in Laibin, Guangxi. Upon its formation, the first-team consisted of footballers from the Guangzhou City youth ranks. The club represented Guangxi in the 2021 National Games of China, and competed in the Guangxi Super League in 2021, in which competition the club eventually won, and enrolled in the 2021 CMCL, the Chinese fourth-tier. In the same year, Guangxi Lanhang began its recruitment process for the affiliated Laibin Lanhang Football School in addition to the first-team. After topping their 2021 CMCL group over Yunnan Yukun Steel, they were eventually knocked out of the competition by Hubei Huachuang.

In 2022, Guangxi Lanhang were promoted to compete in the CMCL again, this time as champions of the Guangxi Champions League, by defeating Nanning Youth on the final matchday. After qualifying out of their group in second place behind Chongqing Tongliangloong in the 2022 CMCL regionals, the club continued their form as they claimed third place, winning promotion to China League Two.

In Guangxi Lanhang's first season in China League Two, the club finished fifth place, with Wang Haozhi scoring the club's first ever professional goal in a 1–0 victory at Hainan Star on 29 April 2023.

== Players ==
=== First-team squad ===
As of 18 March 2024

Note: Flags indicate national team as defined under FIFA eligibility rules; some limited exceptions apply. Players may hold more than one non-FIFA nationality.

No.	Pos.	Nation	Player
1	GK	CHN	Wang Xibo
3	DF	CHN	Xie Shixian
5	DF	CHN	Chen Shaohao
6	MF	CHN	Guo Yongchu (on loan from Hunan Billows)
7	FW	CHN	Xi Zhenyun
8	MF	CHN	Zheng Yujiang
9	FW	CHN	Wang Si
10	MF	CHN	Memet-Raim Memet-Ali (on loan from Changchun Yatai)
11	MF	CHN	An Yongjian
13	DF	CHN	Zhang Jiawei
16	DF	CHN	Cheng Hui
17	MF	ESP	David Wang
18	MF	CHN	Zou Qi

No.	Pos.	Nation	Player
19	FW	CHN	Imam Asan Ababekori
20	MF	CHN	Jiang Zhengjie
22	DF	CHN	Liao Jiajun
23	MF	CHN	Chi Dian
30	MF	CHN	Yu Xueyi
41	GK	CHN	Zhou Weixiang
42	GK	CHN	Huang Xuanzhong
43	MF	CHN	Zheng Yikang
44	FW	CHN	Xia Zhengrong
45	DF	CHN	Huang Yufei
46	MF	CHN	Li Jingchengyu
47	MF	CHN	Yu Jiajun
48	DF	CHN	Wei Minghe

== Coaching staff ==
Position	Staff
Manager	(China) Li Yunjing
Assistant coach	(China) Zhou Chun
First-team goalkeeping coach	(China) Zhang Zhimin
First-team physio	(China) Cao Yaping
Physical performance	(China) Wei Min

== Honours ==
League

- CMCL
  - Play-off winners: 2022
