= Cheng Hui (footballer) =

Chinese association football player

Personal information
- Date of birth: 2 August 1997 (age 29)
- Place of birth: Dalian, Liaoning, China
- Height: 1.75 m (5 ft 9 in)
- Position: Midfielder

Team information
- Current team: Guangxi Lanhang
- Number: 27

Youth career
- Sabadell
- 2016–2018: Lleida Esportiu

Senior career*
Years	Team	Apps	(Gls)
2016–2019	Lleida Esportiu B	21	(0)
2018–2019	Lleida Esportiu	0	(0)
2019–2020	Dalian Pro	4	(0)
2023	Heilongjiang Ice City	6	(0)
2024–	Guangxi Lanhang	38	(1)

International career^{‡}
2019	China U22	2	(0)
- * Club domestic league appearances and goals as of 14:01, 23 December 2023 (UTC) ‡ National team caps and goals as of 14:01, 2 February 2021 (UTC)

Cheng Hui (simplified Chinese: 程辉; traditional Chinese: 程輝; pinyin: Chéng Huī; born 2 August 1997) is a Chinese footballer who plays for Guangxi Lanhang.

== Club career ==
Cheng Hui would play in Spain for the Lleida Esportiu B team before being promoted to their senior team where he made his debut appearance for third tier Spanish club Lleida Esportiu on 9 January 2018 in a Copa del Rey game against Atlético Madrid in a 3-0 defeat. He returned to China to join top tier club Dalian Professional where he made his debut on 1 December 2019 in a league game against Beijing Renhe that ended in a 2-0 victory.

== Career statistics ==
As of 2 February 2023.

Club	Season	League			National Cup		Continental		Other		Total	
Club	Season	Division	Apps	Goals	Apps	Goals	Apps	Goals	Apps	Goals	Apps	Goals
Lleida Esportiu B	2016–17	Primera Catalana	2	0	–		–		0	0	2	0
Lleida Esportiu B	2017–18	Primera Catalana	6	0	–		–		0	0	6	0
Lleida Esportiu B	2018–19	Primera Catalana	13	0	–		–		0	0	13	0
Lleida Esportiu B	Total		21	0	0	0	0	0	0	0	21	0
Lleida Esportiu	2017–18	Segunda División B	0	0	1 (Note: Appearances in the Copa del Rey)	0	–		0	0	1	0
Lleida Esportiu	2018–19	Segunda División B	0	0	0	0	–		0	0	0	0
Lleida Esportiu	Total		0	0	1	0	0	0	0	0	1	0
Dalian Professional	2019	Chinese Super League	1	0	0	0	–		0	0	1	0
Dalian Professional	2020	Chinese Super League	0	0	1 (Note: Appearances in the Chinese FA Cup)	0	-		-		1	0
Dalian Professional	Total		1	0	1	0	0	0	0	0	2	0
Career total			22	0	2	0	0	0	0	0	24	0
