= 2022 Chinese Champions League =

Football league season

Chinese Champions League
- Season: 2022
- Dates: 18 June – 20 November 2022
- Champions: Yuxi Yukun
- Promoted: Yuxi Yukun; Chongqing Tongliangloong; Guangxi Lanhang; Dalian Duxing

The 2022 Chinese Champions League, officially known as the Wisense Life 2022 Chinese Football Association Member Association Champions League (Chinese: 慧心生命2022中国足球协会会员协会冠军联赛) for sponsorship reasons, was the 21st season since its establishment in 2002.

33 of the 50 member associations pre-elected 61 teams through leagues, cups or recommendations.

Following the 2021 season when Xinjiang PCC FA became new member association of the CFA and recommended club to enter the CMCL, this season, the new members, Federation of University Sports of China and Chinese Enterprise Sports Association also introduced 4 clubs to the CMCL.

== Name Changes ==
- Baoding Rongyao F.C. changed its name to Baoding Xuecheng Athletic in February 2022.
- Yunnan Yukun Steel F.C. changed its name to Yuxi Yukun in April 2022.
- Jilin Senyang F.C. changed its name to Changchun Xidu in May 2022.

== Qualified Teams ==
According to CMCL's Format & Rules, the leagues organised by the member associations should be round-robin tournaments with more than 8 clubs, and at most 4 clubs are eligible to apply for CMCL. In fact, of the 57 teams (excludes 4 teams that entered the CMCL Finals last season), only 4 teams, Xiamen Lujian Tiancheng, Suzhou Deehero, Xinjiang Lingmengzhe, and Qingdao Great Star, fully complied with top 4 clubs in their leagues.

There are 7 teams, which were either competing in the city-level associations or directly recommended by them, then got the qualification of CMCL through the member associations (Fujian FA, Shandong FA and Anhui FA).

Italic in the Position column means the qualificated competition fixtures is still uncompleted.

Football association	Qualificated competition	Season	Position	Team	City	Head Coach
Yunnan FA	CMCL	2021	11th	Yuxi Yukun	Yuxi	Shi Jun
Yunnan FA	Yunnan Province National Counties Social Tournament	2021	Winners	Lijiang 07 United	Lijiang	He Shijian
Yunnan FA	Yunnan Province National Counties Social Tournament	2021	3rd	Lijiang Yuanheng	Lijiang	(Serbia) Dragan Stančić
Sichuan FA	CMCL	2021	14th	Sichuan Tianfu	Chengdu	Liu Wentao
Gansu FA	CMCL	2021	15th	Jingchuan Wenhui	Jingchuan	Yin Youyou
Xi'an FA	CMCL	2021	16th	Xi'an Ronghai	Xi'an	Tan Baiqiang
Guangxi FA	Guangxi Clubs Championship League	2022	1st	Guangxi Lanhang	Laibin	Xie Yuxin
Guangxi FA	Guangxi Clubs Championship League	2022	2nd	Guangxi Hengchen	Nanning	Wang Jun
Guangxi FA	Guangxi Clubs Championship League	2022	3rd	Guangxi Yong City	Nanning	Wang Zhenchuang
Guangxi FA	Guangxi Super League	2021	3rd	Liuzhou Ranko	Liuzhou	Yang Ke
Fujian FA	Fuzhou National Fitness Amateur League One (Fuzhou FA)	2021	1st	Fuzhou Hengxing	Fuzhou	Fan Wenlong
Fujian FA	recommendation (Fuzhou FA)	–	–	Fuzhou Changle Jingangtui	Fuzhou	Guo Yabin
Fujian FA	Quanzhou Super League (Quanzhou FA)	2021	2nd	Fujian Quanzhou Qinggong	Quanzhou	Zhao Wanli
Xiamen FA	Xiamen FA Super League	2021	2nd	Xiamen Lujian Tiancheng	Xiamen	Shen Jinglong
Guangdong FA	Guangdong FA Super League	2021	1st	Guangdong Red Treasure	Guangzhou	Wu Wenbing
Shanghai FA	Shanghai FA Super League Group A	2021	1st	Shanghai Mitsubishi Heavy Industries Flying Lion	Shanghai	Huang Yi
Shanghai FA	Shanghai FA Super League Group A	2021	3rd	Shanghai Luckystar	Shanghai	Chi Jianfeng
Shanghai FA	Shanghai FA Super League Group A	2021	5th	Shanghai Huazheng	Shanghai	Wu Changqi
Shanghai FA	Shanghai FA Super League Group A	2021	6th	Shanghai Tongji	Shanghai	Xu Lei
Jiangsu FA	Jiangsu FA Champions League	2021	2nd	Suzhou Deehero	Suzhou	Zhao Libin
Nanjing FA	Nanjing FA Super League	2022	1st	Nanjing Tehu	Nanjing	Tang Bo
Jiangxi FA	Jiangxi FA Super League	2021	2nd	Jiujiang LY	Jiujiang	Ren Xin
Zhejiang FA	Zhejiang Super League Division A	2021	1st	Hangzhou Qiantang	Hangzhou	Gu Zhongqing
Ningxia FA	Ningxia FA Super League	2021	2nd	Yinchuan Sanyuan	Yinchuan	Zhai Nan
Ningxia FA	Ningxia FA Super League	2021	3rd	Shizuishan Hengxing	Shizuishan	Men Wenfeng
Xinjiang FA	Xinjiang FA Champions League	2021	2nd	Xinjiang Lingmengzhe	Ürümqi	(Portugal) Quim
Tianjin FA	Tianjin FA Super League	2022	2nd	Tianjin Fusheng	Tianjin	Gao Qiming
Tianjin FA	Tianjin FA Super League	2022	3rd	Tianjin Yiteng Haitian Xinmei Zhicai	Tianjin	Dong Peng
Tianjin FA	Tianjin FA Super League	2022	4th	Tianjin Shengde	Tianjin	Liu Bing
Tianjin FA	Tianjin FA Super League	2022	5th	Tianjin Hopeful	Tianjin	Shi Meng
Hubei FA	Hubei Public League	2021–22	Finals	Hubei Wuhan Athletics Zaiming	Wuhan	Zhao Peng
Changchun FA	Changchun Amateur League	2021	Group stage	Changchun Shenhua	Changchun	Cao Tianbao
Changchun FA	recommendation	–	–	Changchun Xidu	Changchun	Cheng Yuqi
Changchun FA	recommendation	–	–	Changchun Golden Kirin	Changchun	Du Xianchao
Liaoning FA	Liaoning Cities Super League	2021	2nd	Yingkou Chaoyue	Yingkou	Ma Kai
Liaoning FA	Liaoning Cities Super League	2021	4th	Anshan Feiyang	Anshan	(Serbia) Aleksandar Dončić
Liaoning FA	recommendation	–	–	Liaoning Leading	Benxi	Sun Jiasen
Qingdao FA	Qingdao City Super League	2021	2nd	Qingdao Great Star	Qingdao	Chen Jidong
Yanbian FA	Yanbian Amateur League	2021	1st	Yanbian Sports School	Yanbian	Cui Guangri
Shandong FA	Rizhao Championship League (Rizhao FA)	2021	1st	Rizhao Yuqi	Rizhao	Yan Tengfei
Shandong FA	Weifang Super Tournament (Weifang FA)	2021	Runners-up	Shandong Yitong	Weifang	Li Xingcan
Shandong FA	recommendation (Linyi FA)	–	–	Linyi Red Arrow	Linyi	Liu Yu
Guizhou FA	Guizhou Amateur Championship	2022	Runners-up	Guizhou GOU	Guiyang	Jiang Baihong
Dalian FA	CMCL Dalian Qualification	2022	unknown	Dalian Duxing	Dalian	Li Guoxu
Dalian FA	CMCL Dalian Qualification	2022	unknown	Dalian Jinshiwan	Dalian	Liu Yujian
Dalian FA	recommendation	–	–	Dalian LFTZ Huayi	Dalian	Yu Ming
Shaanxi FA	recommendation	–	–	Xi'an Yilian	Xi'an	Huang Qixiang
Anhui FA	recommendation (Hefei FA)	–	–	Hefei City	Hefei	Huang Chong
Xinjiang PCC FA	recommendation	–	–	Xinjiang Alar 359	Aral	(Ukraine) Ihor Heraskin
Hebei FA	recommendation	–	–	Baoding Xuecheng Athletic	Baoding	Di You
Chongqing FA	recommendation	–	–	Chongqing Tongliangloong	Chongqing	Lin Lin
Chongqing FA	recommendation	–	–	Chongqing Rich	Chongqing	Chen Zheng
Chongqing FA	recommendation	–	–	Chongqing Benbiao	Chongqing	Zu Wentao
Hunan FA	recommendation	–	–	Xiangtan Zero Point	Xiangtan	Teng Renjun
Hunan FA	recommendation	–	–	Hunan HBS Mangguoba	Changsha	Jia Hong
Chinese Enterprise Sports Association	recommendation	–	–	Beijing Smart Sky	Beijing	Wang Shuo

== Regional competitions ==
The draw for the regional competitions took place on 2 June 2022.

=== Group A ===
Pos	Team	Pld	W	D	L	GF	GA	GD	Pts	Qualification
1	Lijiang Yuanheng (Q)	2	2	0	0	6	1	+5	6	Qualification for Elimination round
2	Hunan HBS Mangguoba (Q)	2	1	0	1	5	1	+4	3	Qualification for Elimination round
3	Liuzhou Ranko	2	0	0	2	1	10	−9	0	

Rules for classification: 1) Points; 2) Head-to-head points; 3) Head-to-head goal difference; 4) Head-to-head goals scored; 5) Goal difference; 6) Goals scored; 7) Disciplinary points (yellow card = 1 point, red card as a result of two yellow cards = 3 points, direct red card = 3 points, yellow card followed by direct red card = 4 points); 8) Drawing of lots.
(Q) Qualified for the phase indicated

18 June 2022	Hunan HBS Mangguoba	5–0	Liuzhou Ranko	Lijiang Sports Development Center, Lijiang
14:00 UTC+8				Referee: Dan Ning

20 June 2022	Liuzhou Ranko	1–5	Lijiang Yuanheng	Lijiang Sports Development Center, Lijiang
17:00 UTC+8				Referee: Hu Tengfei

22 June 2022	Lijiang Yuanheng	1–0	Hunan HBS Mangguoba	Lijiang Sports Development Center, Lijiang
14:00 UTC+8				Referee: Pei Xiaodong

=== Group B ===
Pos	Team	Pld	W	D	L	GF	GA	GD	Pts	Qualification
1	Guangxi Hengchen (Q)	2	2	0	0	5	1	+4	6	Qualification for Elimination round
2	Yuxi Yukun (Q)	2	1	0	1	5	1	+4	3	Qualification for Elimination round
3	Chongqing Rich	2	0	0	2	1	9	−8	0	

Rules for classification: 1) Points; 2) Head-to-head points; 3) Head-to-head goal difference; 4) Head-to-head goals scored; 5) Goal difference; 6) Goals scored; 7) Disciplinary points (yellow card = 1 point, red card as a result of two yellow cards = 3 points, direct red card = 3 points, yellow card followed by direct red card = 4 points); 8) Drawing of lots.
(Q) Qualified for the phase indicated

18 June 2022	Yuxi Yukun	0–1	Guangxi Hengchen	Lijiang Sports Development Center, Lijiang
17:00 UTC+8				Referee: Zhang Yi

20 June 2022	Chongqing Rich	0–5	Yuxi Yukun	Lijiang Sports Development Center, Lijiang
14:00 UTC+8				Referee: Zhang Zhusheng

22 June 2022	Chongqing Rich	1–4	Guangxi Hengchen	Lijiang Sports Development Center, Lijiang
17:00 UTC+8				Referee: Chen Bin

=== Group C ===
Pos	Team	Pld	W	D	L	GF	GA	GD	Pts	Qualification
1	Guangxi Yong City (Q)	3	2	1	0	3	1	+2	7	Qualification for Elimination round
2	Chongqing Benbiao (Q)	3	1	2	0	3	1	+2	5	Qualification for Elimination round
3	Lijiang 07 United	3	1	1	1	1	1	0	4	
4	Xiangtan Zero Point	3	0	0	3	0	4	−4	0	

Rules for classification: 1) Points; 2) Head-to-head points; 3) Head-to-head goal difference; 4) Head-to-head goals scored; 5) Goal difference; 6) Goals scored; 7) Disciplinary points (yellow card = 1 point, red card as a result of two yellow cards = 3 points, direct red card = 3 points, yellow card followed by direct red card = 4 points); 8) Drawing of lots.
(Q) Qualified for the phase indicated

8 July 2022	Guangxi Yong City	1–1	Chongqing Benbiao	Guigang Sports Center, Guigang
17:00 UTC+8				Referee: Zhu Di

8 July 2022	Lijiang 07 United	1–0	Xiangtan Zero Point	Guigang Jiulinghu Football Training Base, Guigang
17:00 UTC+8				Referee: Wang Pengwei

10 July 2022	Chongqing Benbiao	0–0	Lijiang 07 United	Guigang Sports Center, Guigang
20:00 UTC+8				Referee: Xue Xiangsheng

10 July 2022	Xiangtan Zero Point	0–1	Guangxi Yong City	Guigang Jiulinghu Football Training Base, Guigang
20:00 UTC+8				Referee: Li Jianjun

12 July 2022	Guangxi Yong City	1–0	Lijiang 07 United	Guigang Sports Center, Guigang
17:00 UTC+8				Referee: Xie Chenyao

12 July 2022	Xiangtan Zero Point	0–2	Chongqing Benbiao	Guigang Jiulinghu Football Training Base, Guigang
17:00 UTC+8				Referee: Wang Guan

=== Group D ===
Pos	Team	Pld	W	D	L	GF	GA	GD	Pts	Qualification
1	Chongqing Tongliangloong (Q)	3	2	1	0	10	0	+10	7	Qualification for Elimination round
2	Guangxi Lanhang (Q)	3	1	2	0	6	1	+5	5	Qualification for Elimination round
3	Sichuan Tianfu	3	1	1	1	3	4	−1	4	
4	Guizhou OU	3	0	0	3	1	15	−14	0	

Rules for classification: 1) Points; 2) Head-to-head points; 3) Head-to-head goal difference; 4) Head-to-head goals scored; 5) Goal difference; 6) Goals scored; 7) Disciplinary points (yellow card = 1 point, red card as a result of two yellow cards = 3 points, direct red card = 3 points, yellow card followed by direct red card = 4 points); 8) Drawing of lots.
(Q) Qualified for the phase indicated

8 July 2022	Sichuan Tianfu	0–2	Chongqing Tongliangloong	Guigang Sports Center, Guigang
20:00 UTC+8				Referee: Cui Yong

8 July 2022	Guizhou OU	0–5	Guangxi Lanhang	Guigang Jiulinghu Football Training Base, Guigang
20:00 UTC+8				Referee: Gu Qianchi

10 July 2022	Chongqing Tongliangloong	8–0	Guizhou OU	Guigang Sports Center, Guigang
17:00 UTC+8				Referee: Liu Xin

10 July 2022	Guangxi Lanhang	1–1	Sichuan Tianfu	Guigang Jiulinghu Football Training Base, Guigang
17:00 UTC+8				Referee: Wang Minjie

12 July 2022	Sichuan Tianfu	2–1	Guizhou OU	Guigang Sports Center, Guigang
20:00 UTC+8				Referee: Li Bin

12 July 2022	Guangxi Lanhang	0–0	Chongqing Tongliangloong	Guigang Jiulinghu Football Training Base, Guigang
20:00 UTC+8				Referee: Yan Cheng

=== Group E ===
Pos	Team	Pld	W	D	L	GF	GA	GD	Pts	Qualification
1	Hangzhou Qiantang (Q)	3	2	1	0	8	2	+6	7	Qualification for Elimination round
2	Fuzhou Changle Jingangtui (Q)	3	2	0	1	4	2	+2	6	Qualification for Elimination round
3	Shanghai Tongji	3	1	1	1	3	3	0	4	
4	Suzhou Deehero	3	0	0	3	3	11	−8	0	

Rules for classification: 1) Points; 2) Head-to-head points; 3) Head-to-head goal difference; 4) Head-to-head goals scored; 5) Goal difference; 6) Goals scored; 7) Disciplinary points (yellow card = 1 point, red card as a result of two yellow cards = 3 points, direct red card = 3 points, yellow card followed by direct red card = 4 points); 8) Drawing of lots.
(Q) Qualified for the phase indicated

2 July 2022	Hangzhou Qiantang	1–0	Fuzhou Changle Jingangtui	Zhangzhou Happy Island Football Training Base Field No.1, Zhangzhou
14:00 UTC+8				Referee: Liu Shuang

2 July 2022	Suzhou Deehero	1–2	Shanghai Tongji	Zhangzhou Happy Island Football Training Base Field No.2, Zhangzhou
14:00 UTC+8				Referee: Wang Xiao

4 July 2022	Fuzhou Changle Jingangtui	3–1	Suzhou Deehero	Zhangzhou Happy Island Football Training Base Field No.1, Zhangzhou
16:15 UTC+8				Referee: Ji Chenguang

4 July 2022	Shanghai Tongji	1–1	Hangzhou Qiantang	Zhangzhou Happy Island Football Training Base Field No.2, Zhangzhou
16:15 UTC+8				Referee: Yin Zhikai

6 July 2022	Hangzhou Qiantang	6–1	Suzhou Deehero	Zhangzhou Happy Island Football Training Base Field No.1, Zhangzhou
14:00 UTC+8				Referee: Liu Bao

6 July 2022	Shanghai Tongji	0–1	Fuzhou Changle Jingangtui	Zhangzhou Happy Island Football Training Base Field No.2, Zhangzhou
14:00 UTC+8				Referee: Zhang Chao

=== Group F ===
Pos	Team	Pld	W	D	L	GF	GA	GD	Pts	Qualification
1	Hefei City (Q)	3	3	0	0	6	2	+4	9	Qualification for Elimination round
2	Nanjing Tehu (Q)	3	1	1	1	4	2	+2	4	Qualification for Elimination round
3	Shanghai Mitsubishi Heavy Industries Flying Lion	3	1	1	1	5	4	+1	4	
4	Xiamen Lujian Tiancheng	3	0	0	3	2	9	−7	0	

Rules for classification: 1) Points; 2) Head-to-head points; 3) Head-to-head goal difference; 4) Head-to-head goals scored; 5) Goal difference; 6) Goals scored; 7) Disciplinary points (yellow card = 1 point, red card as a result of two yellow cards = 3 points, direct red card = 3 points, yellow card followed by direct red card = 4 points); 8) Drawing of lots.
(Q) Qualified for the phase indicated

2 July 2022	Shanghai Mitsubishi Heavy Industries Flying Lion	1–2	Hefei City	Zhangzhou Happy Island Football Training Base Field No.1, Zhangzhou
16:15 UTC+8				Referee: Zheng Shenfei

2 July 2022	Nanjing Tehu	3–0	Xiamen Lujian Tiancheng	Zhangzhou Happy Island Football Training Base Field No.2, Zhangzhou
16:15 UTC+8				Referee: Xie Lizhi

4 July 2022	Hefei City	1–0	Nanjing Tehu	Zhangzhou Happy Island Football Training Base Field No.1, Zhangzhou
14:00 UTC+8				Referee: Liu Yang

4 July 2022	Xiamen Lujian Tiancheng	1–3	Shanghai Mitsubishi Heavy Industries Flying Lion	Zhangzhou Happy Island Football Training Base Field No.2, Zhangzhou
14:00 UTC+8				Referee: Wang Xinyao

6 July 2022	Shanghai Mitsubishi Heavy Industries Flying Lion	1–1	Nanjing Tehu	Zhangzhou Happy Island Football Training Base Field No.1, Zhangzhou
16:15 UTC+8				Referee: Liu Xindong

6 July 2022	Xiamen Lujian Tiancheng	1–3	Hefei City	Zhangzhou Happy Island Football Training Base Field No.2, Zhangzhou
16:15 UTC+8				Referee: Chen Sheng

=== Group G ===
Pos	Team	Pld	W	D	L	GF	GA	GD	Pts	Qualification
1	Guangdong Red Treasure (Q)	2	2	0	0	6	2	+4	6	Qualification for Elimination round
2	Shanghai Luckystar (Q)	2	1	0	1	3	4	−1	3	Qualification for Elimination round
3	Fujian Quanzhou Qinggong	2	0	0	2	2	5	−3	0	

Rules for classification: 1) Points; 2) Head-to-head points; 3) Head-to-head goal difference; 4) Head-to-head goals scored; 5) Goal difference; 6) Goals scored; 7) Disciplinary points (yellow card = 1 point, red card as a result of two yellow cards = 3 points, direct red card = 3 points, yellow card followed by direct red card = 4 points); 8) Drawing of lots.
(Q) Qualified for the phase indicated

16 July 2022	Shanghai Luckystar	2–1	Fujian Quanzhou Qinggong	Zhaoqing New District Sports Center, Zhaoqing
17:00 UTC+8				Referee: Wang Pengwei

18 July 2022	Fujian Quanzhou Qinggong	1–3	Guangdong Red Treasure	Zhaoqing New District Sports Center, Zhaoqing
20:00 UTC+8				Referee: Zhu Hao

20 July 2022	Guangdong Red Treasure	3–1	Shanghai Luckystar	Zhaoqing New District Sports Center, Zhaoqing
17:00 UTC+8				Referee: Yang Guorong

=== Group H ===
Pos	Team	Pld	W	D	L	GF	GA	GD	Pts	Qualification
1	Jiujiang LY (Q)	2	1	1	0	8	2	+6	4	Qualification for Elimination round
2	Fuzhou Hengxing (Q)	2	1	1	0	4	2	+2	4	Qualification for Elimination round
3	Shanghai Huazheng	2	0	0	2	0	8	−8	0	

Rules for classification: 1) Points; 2) Head-to-head points; 3) Head-to-head goal difference; 4) Head-to-head goals scored; 5) Goal difference; 6) Goals scored; 7) Disciplinary points (yellow card = 1 point, red card as a result of two yellow cards = 3 points, direct red card = 3 points, yellow card followed by direct red card = 4 points); 8) Drawing of lots.
(Q) Qualified for the phase indicated

16 July 2022	Jiujiang LY	6–0	Shanghai Huazheng	Zhaoqing New District Sports Center, Zhaoqing
20:00 UTC+8				Referee: Wang Wenbing

18 July 2022	Shanghai Huazheng	0–2	Fuzhou Hengxing	Zhaoqing New District Sports Center, Zhaoqing
17:00 UTC+8				Referee: Wang Zisheng

20 July 2022	Fuzhou Hengxing	2–2	Jiujiang LY	Zhaoqing New District Sports Center, Zhaoqing
20:00 UTC+8				Referee: Jiang Rui

=== Group I ===
Pos	Team	Pld	W	D	L	GF	GA	GD	Pts	Qualification
1	Dalian Duxing (Q)	2	2	0	0	11	0	+11	6	Qualification for Elimination round
2	Rizhao Yuqi (Q)	2	1	0	1	3	4	−1	3	Qualification for Elimination round
3	Changchun Golden Kirin	2	0	0	2	1	11	−10	0	

Rules for classification: 1) Points; 2) Head-to-head points; 3) Head-to-head goal difference; 4) Head-to-head goals scored; 5) Goal difference; 6) Goals scored; 7) Disciplinary points (yellow card = 1 point, red card as a result of two yellow cards = 3 points, direct red card = 3 points, yellow card followed by direct red card = 4 points); 8) Drawing of lots.
(Q) Qualified for the phase indicated

1 September 2022	Rizhao Yuqi	0–3	Dalian Duxing	Rizhao International Football Center Training Base Field No.1, Rizhao
14:00 UTC+8				Referee: Liu Xun

3 September 2022	Changchun Golden Kirin	1–3	Rizhao Yuqi	Rizhao International Football Center Training Base Field No.1, Rizhao
16:30 UTC+8				Referee: Sun Chen

5 September 2022	Changchun Golden Kirin	0–8	Dalian Duxing	Rizhao International Football Center Training Base Field No.1, Rizhao
14:00 UTC+8				Referee: Huang Xiang

=== Group J ===
Pos	Team	Pld	W	D	L	GF	GA	GD	Pts	Qualification
1	Yingkou Chaoyue (Q)	2	2	0	0	4	1	+3	6	Qualification for Elimination round
2	Linyi Red Arrow (Q)	2	1	0	1	3	2	+1	3	Qualification for Elimination round
3	Changchun Xidu	2	0	0	2	0	4	−4	0	
4	Shandong Yitong	0	0	0	0	0	0	0	0	Withdrew

Rules for classification: 1) Points; 2) Head-to-head points; 3) Head-to-head goal difference; 4) Head-to-head goals scored; 5) Goal difference; 6) Goals scored; 7) Disciplinary points (yellow card = 1 point, red card as a result of two yellow cards = 3 points, direct red card = 3 points, yellow card followed by direct red card = 4 points); 8) Drawing of lots.
(Q) Qualified for the phase indicated

1 September 2022	Changchun Xidu	0–2	Linyi Red Arrow	Rizhao International Football Center Training Base Field No.2, Rizhao
16:30 UTC+8				Referee: Huang Xiang

3 September 2022	Linyi Red Arrow	1–2	Yingkou Chaoyue	Rizhao International Football Center Training Base Field No.2, Rizhao
14:00 UTC+8				Referee: Chen Sheng

5 September 2022	Yingkou Chaoyue	2–0	Changchun Xidu	Rizhao International Football Center Training Base Field No.2, Rizhao
16:30 UTC+8				Referee: Liu Xun

=== Group K ===
Pos	Team	Pld	W	D	L	GF	GA	GD	Pts	Qualification
1	Dalian Jinshiwan (Q)	3	3	0	0	17	0	+17	9	Qualification for Elimination round
2	Anshan Feiyang (Q)	3	1	1	1	4	7	−3	4	Qualification for Elimination round
3	Qingdao Great Star	3	0	2	1	1	4	−3	2	
4	Yanbian Sports School	3	0	1	2	1	12	−11	1	

Rules for classification: 1) Points; 2) Head-to-head points; 3) Head-to-head goal difference; 4) Head-to-head goals scored; 5) Goal difference; 6) Goals scored; 7) Disciplinary points (yellow card = 1 point, red card as a result of two yellow cards = 3 points, direct red card = 3 points, yellow card followed by direct red card = 4 points); 8) Drawing of lots.
(Q) Qualified for the phase indicated

17 August 2022	Dalian Jinshiwan	7–0	Anshan Feiyang	Puwan Stadium Outer Field, Dalian
17:00 UTC+8				Referee: Huang Xiang

17 August 2022	Qingdao Great Star	1–1	Yanbian Sports School	Dalian Youth Football Training Base Field No.10, Dalian
17:00 UTC+8				Referee: Liu Hang

19 August 2022	Anshan Feiyang	0–0	Qingdao Great Star	Puwan Stadium Outer Field, Dalian
17:00 UTC+8				Referee: Li Jianjun

19 August 2022	Yanbian Sports School	0–7	Dalian Jinshiwan	Dalian Youth Football Training Base Field No.10, Dalian
17:00 UTC+8				Referee: Li Tong

21 August 2022	Dalian Jinshiwan	3–0	Qingdao Great Star	Puwan Stadium Outer Field, Dalian
17:00 UTC+8				Referee: Xue Xiangsheng

21 August 2022	Yanbian Sports School	0–4	Anshan Feiyang	Dalian Youth Football Training Base Field No.10, Dalian
17:00 UTC+8				Referee: Xie Lizhi

=== Group L ===
Pos	Team	Pld	W	D	L	GF	GA	GD	Pts	Qualification
1	Changchun Shenhua (Q)	2	2	0	0	4	0	+4	6	Qualification for Elimination round
2	Dalian LFTZ Huayi (Q)	2	1	0	1	5	2	+3	3	Qualification for Elimination round
3	Liaoning Leading	2	0	0	2	1	8	−7	0	

Rules for classification: 1) Points; 2) Head-to-head points; 3) Head-to-head goal difference; 4) Head-to-head goals scored; 5) Goal difference; 6) Goals scored; 7) Disciplinary points (yellow card = 1 point, red card as a result of two yellow cards = 3 points, direct red card = 3 points, yellow card followed by direct red card = 4 points); 8) Drawing of lots.
(Q) Qualified for the phase indicated

17 August 2022	Dalian LFTZ Huayi	5–1	Liaoning Leading	Dalian Youth Football Training Base Field No.10, Dalian
20:00 UTC+8				Referee: Zhu Di

19 August 2022	Liaoning Leading	0–3; Awarded	Changchun Shenhua	Dalian Youth Football Training Base Field No.10, Dalian
20:00 UTC+8				Referee: Zheng Shenfei

21 August 2022	Changchun Shenhua	1–0	Dalian LFTZ Huayi	Dalian Youth Football Training Base Field No.10, Dalian
20:00 UTC+8				Referee: Ma Li

=== Group M ===
Pos	Team	Pld	W	D	L	GF	GA	GD	Pts	Qualification
1	Tianjin Shengde (Q)	3	2	0	1	9	6	+3	6	Qualification for Elimination round
2	Shizuishan Hengxing (Q)	3	2	0	1	9	8	+1	6	Qualification for Elimination round
3	Xinjiang Lingmengzhe	3	1	1	1	6	6	0	4	
4	Hubei Wuhan Athletics Zaiming	3	0	1	2	3	7	−4	1	

Rules for classification: 1) Points; 2) Head-to-head points; 3) Head-to-head goal difference; 4) Head-to-head goals scored; 5) Goal difference; 6) Goals scored; 7) Disciplinary points (yellow card = 1 point, red card as a result of two yellow cards = 3 points, direct red card = 3 points, yellow card followed by direct red card = 4 points); 8) Drawing of lots.
(Q) Qualified for the phase indicated

22 July 2022	Hubei Wuhan Athletics Zaiming	0–3	Tianjin Shengde	Ningxia Youth Football Training Base Field No.1, Yinchuan
9:30 UTC+8				Referee: Zhang Long

22 July 2022	Xinjiang Lingmengzhe	2–3	Shizuishan Hengxing	Ningxia Youth Football Training Base Field No.2, Yinchuan
9:30 UTC+8				Referee: Huang Xiang

24 July 2022	Tianjin Shengde	0–1	Xinjiang Lingmengzhe	Ningxia Youth Football Training Base Field No.1, Yinchuan
17:00 UTC+8				Referee: Chen Hao

24 July 2022	Shizuishan Hengxing	1–0	Hubei Wuhan Athletics Zaiming	Ningxia Youth Football Training Base Field No.2, Yinchuan
17:00 UTC+8				Referee: Li Zheng

26 July 2022	Hubei Wuhan Athletics Zaiming	3–3	Xinjiang Lingmengzhe	Ningxia Youth Football Training Base Field No.1, Yinchuan
9:30 UTC+8				Referee: Zhang Hengji

26 July 2022	Shizuishan Hengxing	5–6	Tianjin Shengde	Ningxia Youth Football Training Base Field No.2, Yinchuan
9:30 UTC+8				Referee: Chen Hao

=== Group N ===
Pos	Team	Pld	W	D	L	GF	GA	GD	Pts	Qualification
1	Jingchuan Wenhui (Q)	3	2	1	0	5	1	+4	7	Qualification for Elimination round
2	Beijing Smart Sky (Q)	3	2	1	0	4	1	+3	7	Qualification for Elimination round
3	Tianjin Hopeful	3	0	1	2	3	6	−3	1	
4	Yinchuan Sanyuan	3	0	1	2	3	7	−4	1	

Rules for classification: 1) Points; 2) Head-to-head points; 3) Head-to-head goal difference; 4) Head-to-head goals scored; 5) Goal difference; 6) Goals scored; 7) Disciplinary points (yellow card = 1 point, red card as a result of two yellow cards = 3 points, direct red card = 3 points, yellow card followed by direct red card = 4 points); 8) Drawing of lots.
(Q) Qualified for the phase indicated

22 July 2022	Jingchuan Wenhui	0–0	Beijing Smart Sky	Ningxia Youth Football Training Base Field No.1, Yinchuan
17:00 UTC+8				Referee: Yuan Zhixin

22 July 2022	Tianjin Hopeful	2–2	Yinchuan Sanyuan	Ningxia Youth Football Training Base Field No.2, Yinchuan
17:00 UTC+8				Referee: Xie Guangqiang

24 July 2022	Beijing Smart Sky	2–1	Tianjin Hopeful	Ningxia Youth Football Training Base Field No.1, Yinchuan
9:30 UTC+8				Referee: Yan Cheng

24 July 2022	Yinchuan Sanyuan	1–3	Jingchuan Wenhui	Ningxia Youth Football Training Base Field No.2, Yinchuan
9:30 UTC+8				Referee: Dai Cheng

26 July 2022	Jingchuan Wenhui	2–0	Tianjin Hopeful	Ningxia Youth Football Training Base Field No.1, Yinchuan
17:00 UTC+8				Referee: Huang Xiang

26 July 2022	Yinchuan Sanyuan	0–2	Beijing Smart Sky	Ningxia Youth Football Training Base Field No.2, Yinchuan
17:00 UTC+8				Referee: Yuan Zhixin

=== Group O ===
Pos	Team	Pld	W	D	L	GF	GA	GD	Pts	Qualification
1	Xinjiang Alar 359 (Q)	2	1	1	0	7	3	+4	4	Qualification for Elimination round
2	Xi'an Ronghai (Q)	2	0	2	0	3	3	0	2	Qualification for Elimination round
3	Tianjin Yiteng Haitian Xinmei Zhicai	2	0	1	1	4	8	−4	1	

Rules for classification: 1) Points; 2) Head-to-head points; 3) Head-to-head goal difference; 4) Head-to-head goals scored; 5) Goal difference; 6) Goals scored; 7) Disciplinary points (yellow card = 1 point, red card as a result of two yellow cards = 3 points, direct red card = 3 points, yellow card followed by direct red card = 4 points); 8) Drawing of lots.
(Q) Qualified for the phase indicated

4 August 2022	Xinjiang Alar 359	6–2	Tianjin Yiteng Haitian Xinmei Zhicai	Northeast Football Training Base Field No.1, Weinan
9:00 UTC+8				Referee: Liu Xiufeng

6 August 2022	Tianjin Yiteng Haitian Xinmei Zhicai	2–2	Xi'an Ronghai	Northeast Football Training Base Field No.1, Weinan
17:30 UTC+8				Referee: Liu Yang

8 August 2022	Xi'an Ronghai	1–1	Xinjiang Alar 359	Northeast Football Training Base Field No.1, Weinan
9:00 UTC+8				Referee: Zhang Long

=== Group P ===
Pos	Team	Pld	W	D	L	GF	GA	GD	Pts	Qualification
1	Tianjin Fusheng (Q)	2	2	0	0	7	0	+7	6	Qualification for Elimination round
2	Baoding Xuecheng Athletic (Q)	2	1	0	1	2	4	−2	3	Qualification for Elimination round
3	Xi'an Yilian	2	0	0	2	1	6	−5	0	

Rules for classification: 1) Points; 2) Head-to-head points; 3) Head-to-head goal difference; 4) Head-to-head goals scored; 5) Goal difference; 6) Goals scored; 7) Disciplinary points (yellow card = 1 point, red card as a result of two yellow cards = 3 points, direct red card = 3 points, yellow card followed by direct red card = 4 points); 8) Drawing of lots.
(Q) Qualified for the phase indicated

4 August 2022	Xi'an Yilian	0–4	Tianjin Fusheng	Northeast Football Training Base Field No.2, Weinan
17:00 UTC+8				Referee: Wang Wenbing

6 August 2022	Tianjin Fusheng	3–0	Baoding Xuecheng Athletic	Northeast Football Training Base Field No.2, Weinan
9:00 UTC+8				Referee: Wang Heqiang

8 August 2022	Xi'an Yilian	1–2	Baoding Xuecheng Athletic	Northeast Football Training Base Field No.2, Weinan
17:30 UTC+8				Referee: Shen Guodong

=== Elimination round ===
==== First leg ====
25 June 2022	Yuxi Yukun	1–0	Lijiang Yuanheng	Lijiang Sports Development Center, Lijiang
14:00 UTC+8				Referee: Zhang Yi

25 June 2022	Hunan HBS Mangguoba	3–1	Guangxi Hengchen	Lijiang Sports Development Center, Lijiang
17:00 UTC+8				Referee: Chen Sijian

9 July 2022	Nanjing Tehu	1–2	Hangzhou Qiantang	Zhangzhou Happy Island Football Training Base Field No.1, Zhangzhou
14:00 UTC+8				Referee: Sun Chen

9 July 2022	Fuzhou Changle Jingangtui	1–2	Hefei City	Zhangzhou Happy Island Football Training Base Field No.2, Zhangzhou
16:15 UTC+8				Referee: Zhang Haoheng

15 July 2022	Guangxi Lanhang	2–1	Guangxi Yong City	Guigang Sports Center, Guigang
17:00 UTC+8				Referee: Wang Yang

15 July 2022	Chongqing Benbiao	0–8	Chongqing Tongliangloong	Guigang Sports Center, Guigang
20:00 UTC+8				Referee: Guo Xiangyu

23 July 2022	Fuzhou Hengxing	2–0	Guangdong Red Treasure	Zhaoqing New District Sports Center, Zhaoqing
17:00 UTC+8				Referee: Zhu Wenbin

23 July 2022	Shanghai Luckystar	0–1	Jiujiang LY	Zhaoqing New District Sports Center, Zhaoqing
20:00 UTC+8				Referee: Pang Longfei

29 July 2022	Beijing Smart Sky	0–2	Tianjin Shengde	Ningxia Youth Football Training Base Field No.1, Yinchuan
9:30 UTC+8				Referee: Zhu Di

29 July 2022	Shizuishan Hengxing	1–0	Jingchuan Wenhui	Ningxia Youth Football Training Base Field No.2, Yinchuan
17:00 UTC+8				Referee: Chen Hao

11 August 2022	Baoding Xuecheng Athletic	0–2	Xinjiang Alar 359	Northeast Football Training Base Field No.1, Weinan
9:00 UTC+8				Referee: Dan Ning

11 August 2022	Xi'an Ronghai	1–1	Tianjin Fusheng	Northeast Football Training Base Field No.2, Weinan
17:30 UTC+8				Referee: Liu Yang

24 August 2022	Dalian LFTZ Huayi	0–0	Dalian Jinshiwan	Puwan Stadium Outer Field, Dalian
17:00 UTC+8				Referee: Zhu Di

24 August 2022	Anshan Feiyang	0–4	Changchun Shenhua	Dalian Youth Football Training Base Field No.10, Dalian
20:00 UTC+8				Referee: Huang Xiang

8 September 2022	Linyi Red Arrow	1–3	Dalian Duxing	Rizhao International Football Center Training Base Field No.1, Rizhao
14:00 UTC+8				Referee: Sun Chen

8 September 2022	Rizhao Yuqi	2–2	Yingkou Chaoyue	Rizhao International Football Center Training Base Field No.2, Rizhao
16:30 UTC+8				Referee: Chen Sheng

==== Second leg ====
27 June 2022	Lijiang Yuanheng	1–1 (1–2 agg.)	Yuxi Yukun	Lijiang Sports Development Center, Lijiang
14:00 UTC+8				Referee: Han Lei

27 June 2022	Guangxi Hengchen	1–0 (2–3 agg.)	Hunan HBS Mangguoba	Lijiang Sports Development Center, Lijiang
17:00 UTC+8				Referee: Jiao Zi

11 July 2022	Hangzhou Qiantang	1–0 (3–1 agg.)	Nanjing Tehu	Zhangzhou Happy Island Football Training Base Field No.1, Zhangzhou
14:00 UTC+8				Referee: Liu Xindong

11 July 2022	Hefei City	2–0 (4–1 agg.)	Fuzhou Changle Jingangtui	Zhangzhou Happy Island Football Training Base Field No.2, Zhangzhou
16:15 UTC+8				Referee: Sun Chen

17 July 2022	Chongqing Tongliangloong	5–0 (13–0 agg.)	Chongqing Benbiao	Guigang Sports Center, Guigang
9:30 UTC+8				Referee: Zhao Ming

17 July 2022	Guangxi Yong City	1–0 (2–2 agg.) (6–7 p)	Guangxi Lanhang	Guigang Sports Center, Guigang
17:00 UTC+8				Referee: Zhu Di

25 July 2022	Guangdong Red Treasure	0–3 (0–5 agg.)	Fuzhou Hengxing	Zhaoqing New District Sports Center, Zhaoqing
17:00 UTC+8				Referee: Cui Yueqiang

25 July 2022	Jiujiang LY	0–0 (1–0 agg.)	Shanghai Luckystar	Zhaoqing New District Sports Center, Zhaoqing
20:00 UTC+8				Referee: Zhu Wenbin

31 July 2022	Tianjin Shengde	3–2 (5–2 agg.)	Beijing Smart Sky	Ningxia Youth Football Training Base Field No.1, Yinchuan
9:30 UTC+8				Referee: Chen Hao

31 July 2022	Jingchuan Wenhui	1–0 (1–1 agg.) (5–3 p)	Shizuishan Hengxing	Ningxia Youth Football Training Base Field No.2, Yinchuan
17:00 UTC+8				Referee: Huang Xiang

13 August 2022	Xinjiang Alar 359	2–3 (4–3 agg.)	Baoding Xuecheng Athletic	Northeast Football Training Base Field No.1, Weinan
9:00 UTC+8				Referee: Liu Xiufeng

13 August 2022	Tianjin Fusheng	4–1 (5–2 agg.)	Xi'an Ronghai	Northeast Football Training Base Field No.2, Weinan
17:30 UTC+8				Referee: Dan Ning

26 August 2022	Dalian Jinshiwan	1–0 (1–0 agg.)	Dalian LFTZ Huayi	Puwan Stadium Outer Field, Dalian
17:00 UTC+8				Referee: Huang Xiang

26 August 2022	Changchun Shenhua	2–1 (6–1 agg.)	Anshan Feiyang	Dalian Youth Football Training Base Field No.10, Dalian
20:00 UTC+8				Referee: Zhao Zengpeng

10 September 2022	Dalian Duxing	2–1 (5–2 agg.)	Linyi Red Arrow	Rizhao International Football Center Training Base Field No.1, Rizhao
14:00 UTC+8				Referee: Huang Xiang

10 September 2022	Yingkou Chaoyue	0–0 (2–2 agg.) (2–4 p)	Rizhao Yuqi	Rizhao International Football Center Training Base Field No.2, Rizhao
16:30 UTC+8				Referee: Liu Xun

== Finals ==
=== Group stage ===
==== Group A ====
Pos	Team	Pld	W	D	L	GF	GA	GD	Pts	Promotion or qualification
1	Yuxi Yukun (C, P)	7	6	1	0	21	3	+18	19	Promotion to League Two and qualification for final
2	Dalian Jinshiwan	7	4	2	1	10	6	+4	14	Qualification for promotion play-offs
3	Changchun Shenhua	7	2	4	1	9	9	0	10	Qualification for promotion play-offs
4	Hefei City	7	2	3	2	8	10	−2	9	Qualification for promotion play-offs
5	Hangzhou Qiantang	7	2	2	3	5	7	−2	8	Qualification for promotion play-offs
6	Tianjin Shengde	7	1	4	2	6	9	−3	7	
7	Hunan HBS Mangguoba	7	1	3	3	6	11	−5	6	
8	Rizhao Yuqi	7	0	1	6	2	12	−10	1	

Rules for classification: 1) Points; 2) Head-to-head points; 3) Head-to-head goal difference; 4) Head-to-head goals scored; 5) Goal difference; 6) Goals scored; 7) Disciplinary points (yellow card = 1 point, red card as a result of two yellow cards = 3 points, direct red card = 3 points, yellow card followed by direct red card = 4 points); 8) Drawing of lots.
(C) Champions; (P) Promoted

27 October 2022	Changchun Shenhua	1–1	Dalian Jinshiwan	Zhaoqing New District Sports Center, Zhaoqing
14:00 UTC+8				Referee: Liu Xun

27 October 2022	Yuxi Yukun	3–0	Tianjin Shengde	Zhaoqing Sports Centre, Zhaoqing
14:00 UTC+8				Referee: Jiang Rui

27 October 2022	Hefei City	2–1	Hunan HBS Mangguoba	Zhaoqing New District Sports Center, Zhaoqing
17:00 UTC+8				Referee: Chen Sheng

27 October 2022	Rizhao Yuqi	0–1	Hangzhou Qiantang	Zhaoqing Sports Centre, Zhaoqing
17:00 UTC+8				Referee: Wu Di

29 October 2022	Tianjin Shengde	1–1	Hangzhou Qiantang	Zhaoqing New District Sports Center, Zhaoqing
14:00 UTC+8				Referee: Jiang Rui

29 October 2022	Changchun Shenhua	2–1	Rizhao Yuqi	Zhaoqing Sports Centre, Zhaoqing
14:00 UTC+8				Referee: Ye Chenjie

29 October 2022	Dalian Jinshiwan	3–0	Hunan HBS Mangguoba	Zhaoqing New District Sports Center, Zhaoqing
17:00 UTC+8				Referee: Wu Di

29 October 2022	Yuxi Yukun	5–0	Hefei City	Zhaoqing Sports Centre, Zhaoqing
17:00 UTC+8				Referee: Liu Xun

1 November 2022	Rizhao Yuqi	0–0	Hunan HBS Mangguoba	Zhaoqing New District Sports Center, Zhaoqing
14:00 UTC+8				Referee: Liu Xun

1 November 2022	Hangzhou Qiantang	0–3	Yuxi Yukun	Zhaoqing Sports Centre, Zhaoqing
14:00 UTC+8				Referee: Jiang Rui

1 November 2022	Tianjin Shengde	1–1	Dalian Jinshiwan	Zhaoqing New District Sports Center, Zhaoqing
17:00 UTC+8				Referee: Wu Di

1 November 2022	Hefei City	2–2	Changchun Shenhua	Zhaoqing Sports Centre, Zhaoqing
17:00 UTC+8				Referee: Gu Yinan

4 November 2022	Tianjin Shengde	1–1	Hefei City	Zhaoqing New District Sports Center, Zhaoqing
14:00 UTC+8				Referee: Li Huigang

4 November 2022	Dalian Jinshiwan	2–1	Rizhao Yuqi	Zhaoqing Sports Centre, Zhaoqing
14:00 UTC+8				Referee: Xue Xiangsheng

4 November 2022	Changchun Shenhua	1–3	Yuxi Yukun	Zhaoqing New District Sports Center, Zhaoqing
17:00 UTC+8				Referee: Liu Xun

4 November 2022	Hunan HBS Mangguoba	1–3	Hangzhou Qiantang	Zhaoqing Sports Centre, Zhaoqing
17:00 UTC+8				Referee: Gu Yinan

7 November 2022	Hangzhou Qiantang	0–1	Dalian Jinshiwan	Zhaoqing New District Sports Center, Zhaoqing
14:00 UTC+8				Referee: Liu Xun

7 November 2022	Hefei City	3–0	Rizhao Yuqi	Zhaoqing Sports Centre, Zhaoqing
14:00 UTC+8				Referee: Huang Xiang

7 November 2022	Hunan HBS Mangguoba	1–1	Yuxi Yukun	Zhaoqing New District Sports Center, Zhaoqing
17:00 UTC+8				Referee: Ye Chenjie

7 November 2022	Changchun Shenhua	1–1	Tianjin Shengde	Zhaoqing Sports Centre, Zhaoqing
17:00 UTC+8				Referee: Li Huigang

10 November 2022	Hefei City	0–0	Hangzhou Qiantang	Zhaoqing New District Sports Center, Zhaoqing
14:00 UTC+8				Referee: Huang Xiang

10 November 2022	Hunan HBS Mangguoba	1–1	Changchun Shenhua	Zhaoqing Sports Centre, Zhaoqing
14:00 UTC+8				Referee: Chen Sheng

10 November 2022	Rizhao Yuqi	0–1	Tianjin Shengde	Zhaoqing New District Sports Center, Zhaoqing
17:00 UTC+8				Referee: Liu Xun

10 November 2022	Yuxi Yukun	3–1	Dalian Jinshiwan	Zhaoqing Sports Centre, Zhaoqing
17:00 UTC+8				Referee: Li Huigang

13 November 2022	Dalian Jinshiwan	1–0	Hefei City	Zhaoqing New District Sports Center Outer Field, Zhaoqing
14:00 UTC+8				Referee: Chen Sheng

13 November 2022	Hangzhou Qiantang	0–1	Changchun Shenhua	Zhaoqing New District Sports Center, Zhaoqing
14:00 UTC+8				Referee: Li Huigang

13 November 2022	Hunan HBS Mangguoba	2–1	Tianjin Shengde	Zhaoqing Sports Centre, Zhaoqing
14:00 UTC+8				Referee: Huang Xiang

13 November 2022	Yuxi Yukun	3–0	Rizhao Yuqi	Zhaoqing New District Sports Center, Zhaoqing
17:00 UTC+8				Referee: Xue Xiangsheng

==== Group B ====
Pos	Team	Pld	W	D	L	GF	GA	GD	Pts	Promotion or qualification
1	Chongqing Tongliangloong (P)	7	6	1	0	19	3	+16	19	Promotion to League Two and qualification for final
2	Fuzhou Hengxing	7	5	0	2	10	5	+5	15	Qualification for promotion play-offs
3	Dalian Duxing (P)	7	4	1	2	12	7	+5	13	Qualification for promotion play-offs
4	Guangxi Lanhang (P)	7	3	3	1	7	5	+2	12	Qualification for promotion play-offs
5	Tianjin Fusheng	7	3	1	3	10	13	−3	10	Qualification for promotion play-offs
6	Jiujiang LY	7	2	1	4	6	10	−4	7	
7	Jingchuan Wenhui	7	1	0	6	5	14	−9	3	
8	Xinjiang Alar 359	7	0	1	6	8	20	−12	1	

Rules for classification: 1) Points; 2) Head-to-head points; 3) Head-to-head goal difference; 4) Head-to-head goals scored; 5) Goal difference; 6) Goals scored; 7) Disciplinary points (yellow card = 1 point, red card as a result of two yellow cards = 3 points, direct red card = 3 points, yellow card followed by direct red card = 4 points); 8) Drawing of lots.
(P) Promoted

27 October 2022	Tianjin Fusheng	2–1	Guangxi Lanhang	Guigang Jiulinghu Football Training Base Field No.1, Guigang
16:30 UTC+8				Referee: Hei Xiaohu

27 October 2022	Fuzhou Hengxing	1–0	Jingchuan Wenhui	Guigang Jiulinghu Football Training Base Field No.1, Guigang
19:30 UTC+8				Referee: Shi Yanzhong

27 October 2022	Jiujiang LY	2–1	Xinjiang Alar 359	Guigang Jiulinghu Football Training Base Field No.2, Guigang
19:30 UTC+8				Referee: Huang Xiang

28 October 2022	Dalian Duxing	0–3; Awarded	Chongqing Tongliangloong	Guigang Jiulinghu Football Training Base Field No.2, Guigang
20:30 UTC+8

30 October 2022	Chongqing Tongliangloong	3–1	Xinjiang Alar 359	Guigang Jiulinghu Football Training Base Field No.1, Guigang
16:30 UTC+8				Referee: Yang Qi

30 October 2022	Tianjin Fusheng	2–1	Jiujiang LY	Guigang Jiulinghu Football Training Base Field No.2, Guigang
16:30 UTC+8				Referee: Zhang Zhusheng

30 October 2022	Guangxi Lanhang	2–1	Jingchuan Wenhui	Guigang Jiulinghu Football Training Base Field No.1, Guigang
19:30 UTC+8				Referee: Huang Xiang

30 October 2022	Dalian Duxing	0–1	Fuzhou Hengxing	Guigang Jiulinghu Football Training Base Field No.2, Guigang
19:30 UTC+8				Referee: Zhao Ming

2 November 2022	Jiujiang LY	1–0	Jingchuan Wenhui	Guigang Jiulinghu Football Training Base Field No.1, Guigang
16:30 UTC+8				Referee: Wen Linhui

2 November 2022	Xinjiang Alar 359	1–5	Dalian Duxing	Guigang Jiulinghu Football Training Base Field No.2, Guigang
16:30 UTC+8				Referee: Huang Xiang

2 November 2022	Chongqing Tongliangloong	0–0	Guangxi Lanhang	Guigang Jiulinghu Football Training Base Field No.1, Guigang
19:30 UTC+8				Referee: Zhao Ming

2 November 2022	Fuzhou Hengxing	1–0	Tianjin Fusheng	Guigang Jiulinghu Football Training Base Field No.2, Guigang
19:30 UTC+8				Referee: Hei Xiaohu

5 November 2022	Chongqing Tongliangloong	2–1	Fuzhou Hengxing	Guigang Jiulinghu Football Training Base Field No.1, Guigang
16:30 UTC+8				Referee: Zhu Di

5 November 2022	Guangxi Lanhang	1–1	Jiujiang LY	Guigang Jiulinghu Football Training Base Field No.2, Guigang
16:30 UTC+8				Referee: Gu Yinan

5 November 2022	Tianjin Fusheng	1–2	Dalian Duxing	Guigang Jiulinghu Football Training Base Field No.1, Guigang
19:30 UTC+8				Referee: Hei Xiaohu

5 November 2022	Jingchuan Wenhui	2–1	Xinjiang Alar 359	Guigang Jiulinghu Football Training Base Field No.2, Guigang
19:30 UTC+8				Referee: Li Zheng

8 November 2022	Xinjiang Alar 359	0–1	Guangxi Lanhang	Guigang Jiulinghu Football Training Base Field No.1, Guigang
16:30 UTC+8				Referee: Zhu Di

8 November 2022	Fuzhou Hengxing	2–1	Jiujiang LY	Guigang Jiulinghu Football Training Base Field No.2, Guigang
16:30 UTC+8				Referee: Shi Yanzhong

8 November 2022	Jingchuan Wenhui	0–2	Dalian Duxing	Guigang Jiulinghu Football Training Base Field No.1, Guigang
19:30 UTC+8				Referee: Di Yongzhou

8 November 2022	Tianjin Fusheng	0–4	Chongqing Tongliangloong	Guigang Jiulinghu Football Training Base Field No.2, Guigang
19:30 UTC+8				Referee: Zhao Ming

11 November 2022	Fuzhou Hengxing	4–1	Xinjiang Alar 359	Guigang Jiulinghu Football Training Base Field No.1, Guigang
16:30 UTC+8				Referee: Zhao Ming

11 November 2022	Jingchuan Wenhui	1–2	Tianjin Fusheng	Guigang Jiulinghu Football Training Base Field No.2, Guigang
16:30 UTC+8				Referee: Zhu Di

11 November 2022	Jiujiang LY	0–2	Chongqing Tongliangloong	Guigang Jiulinghu Football Training Base Field No.1, Guigang
19:30 UTC+8				Referee: Yang Qi

11 November 2022	Dalian Duxing	1–1	Guangxi Lanhang	Guigang Jiulinghu Football Training Base Field No.2, Guigang
19:30 UTC+8				Referee: Gu Yinan

14 November 2022	Xinjiang Alar 359	3–3	Tianjin Fusheng	Guigang Jiulinghu Football Training Base Field No.1, Guigang
13:00 UTC+8				Referee: Zhao Ming

14 November 2022	Dalian Duxing	2–0	Jiujiang LY	Guigang Jiulinghu Football Training Base Field No.3, Guigang
15:15 UTC+8				Referee: Liu Xun

14 November 2022	Guangxi Lanhang	1–0	Fuzhou Hengxing	Guigang Jiulinghu Football Training Base Field No.1, Guigang
15:15 UTC+8				Referee: Ma Li

14 November 2022	Jingchuan Wenhui	1–5	Chongqing Tongliangloong	Guigang Jiulinghu Football Training Base Field No.2, Guigang
15:15 UTC+8				Referee: Shi Yanzhong

=== Promotion play-offs ===
==== First round ====
17 November 2022	Dalian Duxing	1–1 (11–10 p)	Hefei City	Guigang Jiulinghu Football Training Base Field No.1, Guigang
13:30 UTC+8				Referee: Huang Xiang

17 November 2022	Dalian Jinshiwan	0–1	Tianjin Fusheng	Guigang Jiulinghu Football Training Base Field No.2, Guigang
16:30 UTC+8				Referee: Ma Li

17 November 2022	Changchun Shenhua	0–2	Guangxi Lanhang	Guigang Jiulinghu Football Training Base Field No.1, Guigang
16:30 UTC+8				Referee: Liu Xun

17 November 2022	Fuzhou Hengxing	2–1	Hangzhou Qiantang	Guigang Jiulinghu Football Training Base Field No.2, Guigang
19:30 UTC+8				Referee: Jin Jingyuan

==== Second round ====
20 November 2022	Dalian Duxing	4–1	Tianjin Fusheng	Guigang Jiulinghu Football Training Base Field No.1, Guigang
15:30 UTC+8				Referee: Jin Jingyuan

20 November 2022	Guangxi Lanhang	2–1	Fuzhou Hengxing	Guigang Jiulinghu Football Training Base Field No.2, Guigang
17:30 UTC+8				Referee: Huang Xiang

=== Final ===
==== First leg ====
17 November 2022	Yuxi Yukun	1–0	Chongqing Tongliangloong	Guigang Jiulinghu Football Training Base Field No.1, Guigang
19:30 UTC+8				Referee: Chen Sheng

==== Second leg ====
20 November 2022	Chongqing Tongliangloong	1–0 (1–1 agg.) (2–4 p)	Yuxi Yukun	Guigang Jiulinghu Football Training Base Field No.1, Guigang
19:30 UTC+8				Referee: Liu Xun
