= 2024 China League Two =

China League Two
- Season: 2024
- Dates: 23 March – 20 October 2024
- Champions: Guangdong GZ-Power
- Promoted: Guangdong GZ-Power; Dalian K'un City; Shenzhen Juniors; Shaanxi Union
- Matches played: 280
- Goals scored: 685 (2.45 per match)
- Top goalscorer: Xia Dalong (15 goals)
- Biggest home win: Guangdong GZ-Power 8–1 Quanzhou Yassin (27 July 2024)
- Biggest away win: Xi'an Chongde Ronghai 0–5 Shaanxi Union (30 March 2024)
- Highest scoring: Guangdong GZ-Power 8–1 Quanzhou Yassin (27 July 2024)
- Longest winning run: 11 matches Guangdong GZ-Power
- Longest unbeaten run: 14 matches Nantong Haimen Codion
- Longest winless run: 18 matches Haikou Mingcheng
- Longest losing run: 7 matches Haikou Mingcheng
- Highest attendance: 23,237; Shaanxi Union 2–0 Guangxi Hengchen (13 October 2024)
- Lowest attendance: 0 Guangxi Lanhang 0–1 Shanghai Port B (11 April 2024); Xi'an Chongde Ronghai 1–4 Nantong Haimen Codion (15 April 2024); Xi'an Chongde Ronghai 0–2 Langfang Glory City (11 May 2024); Shaanxi Union 3–0 Rizhao Yuqi (11 July 2024)
- Total attendance: 644,030
- Average attendance: 2,300

The 2024 Chinese Football Association League 2 (Chinese: 2024中国足球协会乙级联赛) was the 35th season of China League Two, the third tier of the Chinese football league pyramid, since its establishment in 1989.

The number of teams in the division was increased from 16 of the previous season to 20. The 2024 China League Two season will, for the first time, introduce two reserve teams of Chinese Super League clubs to participate in the division, through achieving first or second place in the CFA U-21 League.

== Clubs ==
=== Club changes ===
==== To League Two ====
Teams promoted from 2023 Chinese Champions League

- Langfang Glory City
- Shenzhen Juniors
- Shaanxi Chang'an Union
- Guangxi Hengchen
- Guangzhou E-Power
- Rizhao Yuqi
- Dalian Huayi
- Xi'an Chongde Ronghai

Teams promoted from 2023 CFA U-21 League

- Shandong Taishan B
- Shanghai Port B

==== From League Two ====
Teams promoted to 2024 China League One

- Chongqing Tonglianglong
- Dalian Zhixing
- Yunnan Yukun
- Qingdao Red Lions

Expelled entries

- ~~Wuhan Jiangcheng~~
- ~~Zibo Qisheng~~

==== Name changes ====
- Shaanxi Chang'an Union F.C. changed their name to Shaanxi Union in January 2024.
- Hainan Star F.C. changed their name to Haikou Mingcheng in February 2024.
- Shaoxing Shangyu Pterosaur F.C. relocated to Dingnan County, Ganzhou, Jiangxi, and changed their name to Ganzhou Ruishi in February 2024.
- Dalian Huayi F.C. changed their name to Dalian K'un City in February 2024.
- Guangzhou E-Power F.C. changed their name to Guangdong GZ-Power in March 2024.

=== Stadiums and locations ===
Locations of the 2024 China League Two teams
North Group South Group

Team	Head coach	City	Stadium	Capacity	2023 season
Guangxi Lanhang	(China) Gong Lei	Laibin	Pingguo Stadium (Pingguo)	30,000	5th
Guangxi Lanhang	(China) Gong Lei	Laibin	Guigang Sports Centre Stadium (Guigang)	30,000	5th
Guangxi Lanhang	(China) Gong Lei	Laibin	Jiuling Lake Football Training Centre Field 1 (Guigang)		5th
Guangxi Lanhang	(China) Gong Lei	Laibin	Baise Sports Center Stadium (Baise)		5th
Beijing IT	(China) Yu Fei	Beijing	BIT Eastern Athletic Field	5,000	6th
Jiangxi Dark Horse Junior	(China) Jiang Chen	Wuyuan	Wuyuan Sports Centre	12,000	7th
Hubei Istar	(China) Gao Feng	Wuhan	Xinhua Road Sports Center	22,140	8th
Nantong Haimen Codion	(China) Lu Qiang	Nantong	Haimen Sports Centre	15,000	9th
Tai'an Tiankuang	(China) Duan Kai	Tai'an	Taishan Stadium	32,000	10th
Haikou Mingcheng	(Serbia) Zaviša Milosavljević	Haikou	Haikou Mission Hills Football Training Base Stadium	500	12th
Hunan Billows	(China) Teng Renjun	Changsha	Loudi Sports Center (Loudi)	30,000	13th
Quanzhou Yassin	(China) Huang Yong	Jinjiang	Jinjiang Football Training Center	8,000	14th
Langfang Glory City ^{P}	(China) Liu Junwei	Langfang	Langfang Stadium	30,040	CMCL, 1st
Shenzhen Juniors ^{P}	(China) Zhang Jun	Shenzhen	Longhua Cultural and Sports Center	5,360	CMCL, 2nd
Shaanxi Union ^{P}	(Spain) Óscar Céspedes	Xi'an (Beilin)	Shaanxi Province Stadium	42,383	CMCL, 3rd
Shaanxi Union ^{P}	(Spain) Óscar Céspedes	Xi'an	Weinan Sports Center Stadium (Weinan)	32,000	CMCL, 3rd
Guangxi Hengchen ^{P}	(China) Sun Weirong	Nanning	Guigang Sports Centre Stadium (Guigang)	30,000	CMCL, 4th
Guangxi Hengchen ^{P}	(China) Sun Weirong	Nanning	Nanning Sports School Wuhe Campus Stadium		CMCL, 4th
Ganzhou Ruishi	(China) Xie Yuxin	Dingnan	Dingnan Youth Football Training Center	12,000	15th
Guangdong GZ-Power ^{P}	(China) Li Bing	Guangzhou	Huadu Stadium	13,394	CMCL, 5th
Guangdong GZ-Power ^{P}	(China) Li Bing	Guangzhou	Huangpu Sports Center	12,000	CMCL, 5th
Rizhao Yuqi ^{P}	(China) Yan Tengfei	Rizhao	Rizhao International Football Center	12,000	CMCL, 6th
Dalian K'un City ^{P}	(China) Zhao Faqing	Dalian	Dalian Football Youth Training Center	5,000	CMCL, 7th
Dalian K'un City ^{P}	(China) Zhao Faqing	Dalian	Jinzhou Stadium	30,776	CMCL, 7th
Xi'an Chongde Ronghai ^{P}	(China) Wang Weijie	Xi'an (Beilin)	Shaanxi Province Stadium	42,383	CMCL, 8th
Xi'an Chongde Ronghai ^{P}	(China) Wang Weijie	Xi'an (Baqiao)	Xi'an Olympic Sports Center	60,033	CMCL, 8th
Xi'an Chongde Ronghai ^{P}	(China) Wang Weijie	Xi'an (Chang'an)	Fengdong Football Park		CMCL, 8th
Xi'an Chongde Ronghai ^{P}	(China) Wang Weijie	Xi'an	Yan'an National Fitness Center (Yan'an)	29,206	CMCL, 8th
Shandong Taishan B ^{P}	(China) Han Peng	Jinan	Zoucheng Sports Centre Stadium (Zoucheng)	30,000	U-21, 1st
Shanghai Port B ^{P}	(China) Chen Xufeng	Shanghai	Jinshan Sports Centre	30,000	U-21, 2nd
Shanghai Port B ^{P}	(China) Chen Xufeng	Shanghai	Jinshan Sports Centre Outer Field		U-21, 2nd

=== Managerial changes ===
Team	Outgoing manager	Manner of departure	Date of vacancy	Position in table	Incoming manager	Date of appointment
Rizhao Yuqi	(China) Sun Bin	End of contract	1 January 2024	Pre-season	(China) Yan Tengfei	1 January 2024
Shandong Taishan B	(China) Yu Yuanwei	Signed by Chongqing Tonglianglong	23 January 2024	Pre-season	(China) Han Peng	27 February 2024
Xi'an Chongde Ronghai	(China) Xu Wenbin	Mutual consent	20 February 2024	Pre-season	(China) Wu Yan	20 February 2024
Dalian K'un City	(China) Cheng Zhongjian (interim)	End of caretaker spell	21 February 2024	Pre-season	(China) Zhao Faqing	21 February 2024
Tai'an Tiankuang	(China) Liu Jindong	Sacked	8 March 2024	Pre-season	(China) Tang Xiaocheng	9 March 2024
Guangxi Lanhang	(China) Xie Yuxin	Signed by Ganzhou Ruishi	9 March 2024	Pre-season	(China) Gong Lei	18 March 2024
Ganzhou Ruishi	(China) Wang Xiangquan	Mutual consent	9 March 2024	Pre-season	(China) Xie Yuxin	9 March 2024
Haikou Mingcheng	(China) Jiang Kun	Mutual consent	15 March 2024	Pre-season	(Japan) Atsushi Haga	15 March 2024
Jiangxi Dark Horse Junior	(Spain) Víctor Torres Mestre	Mutual consent	22 March 2024	Pre-season	(China) Jiang Chen	22 March 2024
Haikou Mingcheng	(Japan) Atsushi Haga	Sacked	10 May 2024	10th, South Group	(China) Li Bo (interim)	10 May 2024
Haikou Mingcheng	(China) Li Bo (interim)	End of interim spell	20 May 2024	10th, South Group	(Serbia) Zaviša Milosavljević	20 May 2024
Guangxi Hengchen	(China) Wang Jun	Resigned	6 June 2024	3rd, South Group	(China) Sun Weirong	7 June 2024
Tai'an Tiankuang	(China) Tang Xiaocheng	Sacked	23 June 2024	8th, North Group	(China) Duan Kai	23 June 2024
Xi'an Chongde Ronghai	(China) Wu Yan	Sacked	24 June 2024	10th, North Group	(China) Wang Weijie	24 June 2024

== North Group ==
=== League table ===
Pos	Team	Pld	W	D	L	GF	GA	GD	Pts	Qualification
1	Shaanxi Union	18	11	3	4	36	17	+19	36	Qualification for Promotion stage
2	Nantong Haimen Codion	18	10	5	3	27	18	+9	35	Qualification for Promotion stage
3	Dalian K'un City	18	9	4	5	25	15	+10	31	Qualification for Promotion stage
4	Langfang Glory City	18	9	3	6	24	17	+7	30	Qualification for Promotion stage
5	Shandong Taishan B	18	8	5	5	20	14	+6	29	Qualification for Promotion stage
6	Beijing IT	18	5	7	6	19	20	−1	22	Qualification for Relegation stage
7	Hubei Istar	18	6	2	10	19	21	−2	20	Qualification for Relegation stage
8	Tai'an Tiankuang	18	4	7	7	12	23	−11	19	Qualification for Relegation stage
9	Rizhao Yuqi	18	4	5	9	15	23	−8	17	Qualification for Relegation stage
10	Xi'an Chongde Ronghai	18	1	5	12	9	38	−29	8	Qualification for Relegation stage

Source: Soccerway
Rules for classification:
- During season: 1) Points; 2) Head-to-head points; 3) Head-to-head goal difference; 4) Head-to-head goals scored; 5) Goal difference; 6) Goals scored; 7) Rankings in the previous season. (Rules 2 to 4 are only applied when teams concerned have finished both/all the matches against others.)
- After season: 1) Points; 2) Head-to-head points; 3) Head-to-head goal difference; 4) Head-to-head goals scored; 5) Goal difference; 6) Goals scored; 7) Disciplinary points (yellow card = 1 point, red card = 3 points); 8) Drawing of lots.

=== Results ===
Home \ Away	BIT	DKC	HBI	LGC	NHC	RZY	SXU	SDT	TAT	XCR
Beijing IT	—	0–3	2–1	1–0	1–2	3–2	2–0	0–1	1–2	4–0
Dalian K'un City	2–0	—	3–1	1–0	3–0	0–1	1–1	0–2	0–0	2–2
Hubei Istar	0–0	0–1	—	2–0	0–2	1–0	0–2	0–0	4–0	2–0
Langfang Glory City	1–1	0–1	3–2	—	2–1	3–0	1–0	2–0	3–0	4–1
Nantong Haimen Codion	1–1	1–1	2–1	1–1	—	2–1	3–2	1–2	1–0	1–0
Rizhao Yuqi	0–0	2–1	1–0	3–0	0–2	—	0–1	1–1	0–1	1–1
Shaanxi Union	2–2	2–1	2–1	1–2	1–1	3–0	—	2–1	4–0	2–0
Shandong Taishan B	2–0	1–2	1–0	0–0	0–1	3–2	0–2	—	0–0	2–0
Tai'an Tiankuang	0–0	2–1	0–1	2–0	1–1	1–1	2–4	1–1	—	0–0
Xi'an Chongde Ronghai	1–1	0–2	2–3	0–2	1–4	0–0	0–5	0–3	1–0	—

Source: Soccerway
Legend: Blue = home team win; Yellow = draw; Red = away team win.
For upcoming matches, an "a" indicates there is an article about the rivalry between the two participants.

=== Positions by round ===
To preserve chronological evolvements, any postponed matches are not included to the round at which they were originally scheduled, but added to the full round they were played immediately afterwards. For example, if a match is scheduled for round 7, but then played between rounds 8 and 9, it will be added to the standings for round 8.

Team ╲ Round	1	2	3	4	5	6	7	8	9	10	11	12	13	14	15	16	17	18
Shaanxi Union	2	1	1	2	1	1	1	1	1	1	1	1	2	2	2	2	1	1
Nantong Haimen Codion	3	4	3	3	2	3	3	2	2	2	2	2	1	1	1	1	2	2
Dalian K'un City	4	3	4	1	3	2	2	3	4	3	3	3	3	3	3	3	3	3
Langfang Glory City	8	9	5	7	6	6	7	4	3	4	4	5	4	5	4	4	4	4
Shandong Taishan B	6	7	7	8	9	7	6	7	7	7	6	6	6	7	6	5	5	5
Beijing IT	1	2	2	4	5	5	5	5	5	5	5	4	5	4	5	6	6	6
Hubei Istar	9	5	6	5	4	4	4	6	6	6	7	7	7	6	7	7	7	7
Tai'an Tiankuang	5	6	8	6	7	9	8	8	8	8	8	8	8	8	8	8	8	8
Rizhao Yuqi	7	8	9	9	8	8	9	9	9	9	9	9	9	9	9	9	9	9
Xi'an Chongde Ronghai	10	10	10	10	10	10	10	10	10	10	10	10	10	10	10	10	10	10

Qualification for Promotion stage
Qualification for Relegation stage

Source: Soccerway

=== Results by match played ===
Team ╲ Round	1	2	3	4	5	6	7	8	9	10	11	12	13	14	15	16	17	18
Beijing IT	W	W	D	L	D	L	D	W	D	D	D	W	L	W	L	L	D	L
Dalian K'un City	W	W	D	W	L	W	D	D	L	W	L	W	W	L	W	W	L	D
Hubei Istar	L	W	L	W	W	L	W	L	D	L	L	L	W	W	L	L	D	L
Langfang Glory City	L	L	W	D	D	D	W	W	W	L	W	L	W	L	W	W	W	L
Nantong Haimen Codion	W	D	W	D	W	D	D	W	D	W	W	W	W	W	L	L	L	W
Rizhao Yuqi	L	L	D	L	W	D	L	L	L	L	D	L	D	W	D	W	L	W
Shaanxi Union	W	W	D	D	W	W	L	W	W	W	W	L	L	W	W	L	W	D
Shandong Taishan B	D	L	D	D	L	W	W	L	D	D	W	W	L	L	W	W	W	W
Tai'an Tiankuang	D	D	L	W	L	L	D	D	D	D	L	W	D	L	L	W	W	L
Xi'an Chongde Ronghai	L	L	D	L	L	D	L	L	D	D	L	L	L	L	D	L	L	W

Source: Soccerway
W = Win; D = Draw; L = Loss

== South Group ==
=== League table ===
Pos	Team	Pld	W	D	L	GF	GA	GD	Pts	Qualification
1	Guangdong GZ-Power	18	16	0	2	40	10	+30	48	Qualification for Promotion stage
2	Shenzhen Juniors	18	9	6	3	33	19	+14	33	Qualification for Promotion stage
3	Guangxi Hengchen	18	8	7	3	23	15	+8	31	Qualification for Promotion stage
4	Hunan Billows	18	8	6	4	25	21	+4	30	Qualification for Promotion stage
5	Shanghai Port B	18	8	5	5	27	20	+7	29	Qualification for Promotion stage
6	Jiangxi Dark Horse Junior	18	5	6	7	16	16	0	21	Qualification for Relegation stage
7	Ganzhou Ruishi	18	5	3	10	22	26	−4	18	Qualification for Relegation stage
8	Guangxi Lanhang	18	3	7	8	16	22	−6	16	Qualification for Relegation stage
9	Quanzhou Yassin	18	3	4	11	15	45	−30	13	Qualification for Relegation stage
10	Haikou Mingcheng	18	0	6	12	16	39	−23	6	Qualification for Relegation stage

Source: Soccerway
Rules for classification:
- During season: 1) Points; 2) Head-to-head points; 3) Head-to-head goal difference; 4) Head-to-head goals scored; 5) Goal difference; 6) Goals scored; 7) Rankings in the previous season. (Rules 2 to 4 are only applied when teams concerned have finished both/all the matches against others.)
- After season: 1) Points; 2) Head-to-head points; 3) Head-to-head goal difference; 4) Head-to-head goals scored; 5) Goal difference; 6) Goals scored; 7) Disciplinary points (yellow card = 1 point, red card = 3 points); 8) Drawing of lots.

=== Results ===
Home \ Away	GZR	GZP	GXH	GXL	HKM	HNB	JXJ	QZY	SHP	SZJ
Ganzhou Ruishi	—	0–2	1–0	1–1	4–1	2–3	0–2	5–0	1–2	0–3
Guangdong GZ-Power	2–1	—	0–1	4–1	3–1	1–0	1–0	8–1	3–0	1–0
Guangxi Hengchen	1–0	1–2	—	0–0	3–1	1–1	1–0	5–1	1–1	2–2
Guangxi Lanhang	1–0	1–2	2–2	—	2–2	1–1	0–0	2–0	0–1	1–1
Haikou Mingcheng	1–2	0–2	0–1	0–1	—	0–1	1–1	1–1	1–1	1–4
Hunan Billows	3–1	0–1	1–2	2–1	2–2	—	0–0	1–0	1–0	0–3
Jiangxi Dark Horse Junior	1–2	0–1	0–0	2–1	1–0	1–2	—	2–0	2–1	2–3
Quanzhou Yassin	1–0	1–5	1–1	2–1	2–1	0–2	1–1	—	1–2	1–5
Shanghai Port B	2–2	0–1	2–0	1–0	6–1	2–2	0–0	3–2	—	2–0
Shenzhen Juniors	0–0	2–1	0–1	1–0	2–2	3–3	2–1	0–0	2–1	—

Source: Soccerway
Legend: Blue = home team win; Yellow = draw; Red = away team win.
For upcoming matches, an "a" indicates there is an article about the rivalry between the two participants.

=== Positions by round ===
To preserve chronological evolvements, any postponed matches are not included to the round at which they were originally scheduled, but added to the full round they were played immediately afterwards. For example, if a match is scheduled for round 7, but then played between rounds 8 and 9, it will be added to the standings for round 8.

Team ╲ Round	1	2	3	4	5	6	7	8	9	10	11	12	13	14	15	16	17	18
Guangdong GZ-Power	3	1	1	1	1	1	1	1	1	1	1	1	1	1	1	1	1	1
Shenzhen Juniors	6	5	8	9	7	6	6	6	6	5	4	4	2	2	2	2	2	2
Guangxi Hengchen	5	10	9	6	4	3	2	4	3	3	3	3	4	4	4	4	5	3
Hunan Billows	10	9	6	8	5	4	3	2	2	2	2	2	3	3	3	3	3	4
Shanghai Port B	9	7	3	3	3	5	5	5	4	4	5	5	5	5	5	5	4	5
Jiangxi Dark Horse Junior	1	2	5	4	6	8	8	8	9	9	7	6	6	6	6	6	6	6
Ganzhou Ruishi	7	4	2	2	2	2	4	3	5	6	6	7	7	7	7	7	7	7
Guangxi Lanhang	4	6	4	7	9	9	9	9	7	7	8	8	8	8	8	8	8	8
Quanzhou Yassin	2	3	7	5	8	7	7	7	8	8	9	9	9	9	9	9	9	9
Haikou Mingcheng	8	8	10	10	10	10	10	10	10	10	10	10	10	10	10	10	10	10

Qualification for Promotion stage
Qualification for Relegation stage

Source: Soccerway

=== Results by match played ===
Team ╲ Round	1	2	3	4	5	6	7	8	9	10	11	12	13	14	15	16	17	18
Ganzhou Ruishi	D	W	W	W	D	L	L	W	L	L	L	L	W	L	L	L	L	D
Guangdong GZ-Power	W	W	W	W	W	W	W	W	W	W	W	L	L	W	W	W	W	W
Guangxi Hengchen	D	L	L	W	W	W	W	D	D	D	W	W	D	D	W	D	L	W
Guangxi Lanhang	D	L	W	L	L	L	D	L	W	D	L	D	L	D	W	L	D	D
Haikou Mingcheng	L	D	L	L	L	L	L	L	L	D	L	D	L	L	L	D	D	D
Hunan Billows	L	D	W	L	W	W	W	W	D	L	W	W	D	D	W	D	D	L
Jiangxi Dark Horse Junior	W	D	L	D	L	L	D	L	D	D	W	W	W	D	L	W	L	L
Quanzhou Yassin	W	D	L	D	L	W	L	L	L	D	L	L	L	D	L	L	W	L
Shanghai Port B	L	D	W	W	D	L	W	D	W	D	L	L	W	W	L	W	W	D
Shenzhen Juniors	D	D	L	L	W	W	L	W	D	W	W	W	W	D	W	D	D	W

Source: Soccerway
W = Win; D = Draw; L = Loss

== Promotion stage ==
=== League table ===
Pos	Team	Pld	W	D	L	GF	GA	GD	Pts	Promotion
1	Guangdong GZ-Power (C, P)	28	19	5	4	50	17	+33	62	Promotion to League One
2	Dalian K'un City (P)	28	16	5	7	36	18	+18	53	Promotion to League One
3	Shenzhen Juniors (P)	28	15	7	6	45	27	+18	52	Promotion to League One
4	Shaanxi Union (P)	28	15	6	7	49	28	+21	51	Promotion to League One
5	Langfang Glory City	28	14	6	8	36	21	+15	48	
6	Shandong Taishan B	28	13	6	9	34	26	+8	45	Ineligible for promotion
7	Guangxi Hengchen	28	12	7	9	36	28	+8	43	
8	Hunan Billows	28	10	11	7	34	36	−2	41	Dissolved
9	Shanghai Port B	28	11	5	12	37	35	+2	38 (Note: Shanghai Port B are ahead of Nantong Haimen Codion on head-to-head points: Shanghai Port B 6, Nantong Haimen Codion 0)	Ineligible for promotion
10	Nantong Haimen Codion	28	10	8	10	35	42	−7	38	

Source: Soccerway
Rules for classification:
- During season: 1) Points; 2) Head-to-head points; 3) Head-to-head goal difference; 4) Head-to-head goals scored; 5) Goal difference; 6) Goals scored; 7) Rankings in the previous season. (Rules 2 to 4 are only applied when teams concerned have finished both/all the matches against others.)
- After season: 1) Points; 2) Head-to-head points; 3) Head-to-head goal difference; 4) Head-to-head goals scored; 5) Goal difference; 6) Goals scored; 7) Disciplinary points (yellow card = 1 point, red card = 3 points); 8) Drawing of lots.
  (C) Champions; (P) Promoted
  Notes:

=== Results ===
Home \ Away	DKC	GZP	GXH	HNB	LGC	NHC	SXU	SDT	SHP	SZJ
Dalian K'un City		1–0	1–0	3–0					1–0	1–0
Guangdong GZ-Power	2–1				0–0	1–1	0–0	2–0		
Guangxi Hengchen	0–2				1–0	5–0	1–2	0–3		
Hunan Billows	0–0				1–1	2–2	1–0	3–1		
Langfang Glory City		1–0	1–0	3–0					2–0	1–1
Nantong Haimen Codion		1–3	1–3	1–1					1–2	0–2
Shaanxi Union		1–1	2–0	1–1					1–2	2–1
Shandong Taishan B		1–1	1–3	3–0					3–2	1–0
Shanghai Port B	0–1				0–3	3–0	1–2	0–1		
Shenzhen Juniors	1–0				1–0	2–1	3–2	1–0		

Source: Soccerway
Legend: Blue = home team win; Yellow = draw; Red = away team win.
For upcoming matches, an "a" indicates there is an article about the rivalry between the two participants.

=== Positions by round ===
To preserve chronological evolvements, any postponed matches are not included to the round at which they were originally scheduled, but added to the full round they were played immediately afterwards. For example, if a match is scheduled for round 7, but then played between rounds 8 and 9, it will be added to the standings for round 8.

Team ╲ Round	19	20	21	22	23	24	25	26	27	28
Guangdong GZ-Power	1	1	1	1	1	1	1	1	1	1
Dalian K'un City	7	4	5	8	5	5	4	3	3	2
Shenzhen Juniors	3	3	2	3	2	4	2	4	4	3
Shaanxi Union	2	2	3	2	3	2	3	2	2	4
Langfang Glory City	6	7	9	10	7	6	6	5	5	5
Shandong Taishan B	9	8	10	6	9	8	9	8	7	6
Guangxi Hengchen	5	6	4	4	4	3	5	6	6	7
Hunan Billows	8	9	7	5	6	7	7	7	8	8
Shanghai Port B	10	10	6	9	10	10	8	9	9	9
Nantong Haimen Codion	4	5	8	7	8	9	10	10	10	10

Leader and promotion to League One
Promotion to League One

Source: Soccerway

=== Results by match played ===
Team ╲ Round	19	20	21	22	23	24	25	26	27	28
Dalian K'un City	D	W	L	L	W	W	W	W	W	W
Guangdong GZ-Power	D	D	W	W	D	W	L	D	L	D
Guangxi Hengchen	W	L	W	L	W	W	L	L	L	L
Hunan Billows	D	D	W	D	D	L	W	L	D	L
Langfang Glory City	W	D	L	D	D	W	W	W	L	W
Nantong Haimen Codion	L	L	L	D	L	L	L	D	D	L
Shaanxi Union	L	D	L	W	D	W	L	W	W	D
Shandong Taishan B	D	W	L	W	L	L	L	W	W	W
Shanghai Port B	L	W	W	L	L	L	W	L	L	L
Shenzhen Juniors	W	L	W	D	W	L	W	L	W	W

Source: Soccerway
W = Win; D = Draw; L = Loss

== Relegation stage ==
=== League table ===
Pos	Team	Pld	W	D	L	GF	GA	GD	Pts
11	Jiangxi Dark Horse Junior	28	10	8	10	29	22	+7	38
12	Ganzhou Ruishi	28	9	8	11	40	40	0	35
13	Beijing IT	28	8	9	11	28	32	−4	33 (Note: Beijing IT are ahead of Rizhao Yuqi on head-to-head points: Beijing IT 4, Rizhao Yuqi 1)
14	Rizhao Yuqi	28	8	9	11	29	34	−5	33
15	Tai'an Tiankuang	28	7	10	11	26	40	−14	31
16	Hubei Istar	28	8	5	15	33	38	−5	29 (Note: Hubei Istar are ahead of Guangxi Lanhang on head-to-head points: Hubei Istar 4, Guangxi Lanhang 1)
17	Guangxi Lanhang	28	6	11	11	31	38	−7	29
18	Haikou Mingcheng	28	5	8	15	31	54	−23	23 (Note: Haikou Mingcheng are ahead of Xi'an Chongde Ronghai on head-to-head points: Haikou Mingcheng 6, Xi'an Chongde Ronghai 0)
19	Xi'an Chongde Ronghai	28	5	8	15	24	49	−25	23
20	Quanzhou Yassin	28	5	6	17	22	60	−38	21

Source: Soccerway
Rules for classification:
- During season: 1) Points; 2) Head-to-head points; 3) Head-to-head goal difference; 4) Head-to-head goals scored; 5) Goal difference; 6) Goals scored; 7) Rankings in the previous season. (Rules 2 to 4 are only applied when teams concerned have finished both/all the matches against others.)
- After season: 1) Points; 2) Head-to-head points; 3) Head-to-head goal difference; 4) Head-to-head goals scored; 5) Goal difference; 6) Goals scored; 7) Disciplinary points (yellow card = 1 point, red card = 3 points); 8) Drawing of lots.
  Notes:

=== Results ===
Home \ Away	BIT	GZR	GXL	HKM	HBI	JXJ	QZY	RZY	TAT	XCR
Beijing IT		0–1	0–2	0–1		1–0	1–0			
Ganzhou Ruishi	3–3				1–1			1–1	3–1	2–2
Guangxi Lanhang	1–1				1–2			2–2	1–1	1–4
Haikou Mingcheng	1–2				2–1			3–2	2–2	2–1
Hubei Istar		1–2	2–2	1–1		0–3	4–1			
Jiangxi Dark Horse Junior	1–0				2–1			2–0	3–0	0–1
Quanzhou Yassin	2–1				2–1			0–0	1–2	0–0
Rizhao Yuqi		3–1	1–0	3–1		1–1	1–0			
Tai'an Tiankuang		1–3	1–2	3–1		1–1	2–0			
Xi'an Chongde Ronghai		1–1	2–3	0–1		1–0	3–1			

Source: Soccerway
Legend: Blue = home team win; Yellow = draw; Red = away team win.
For upcoming matches, an "a" indicates there is an article about the rivalry between the two participants.

=== Positions by round ===
To preserve chronological evolvements, any postponed matches are not included to the round at which they were originally scheduled, but added to the full round they were played immediately afterwards. For example, if a match is scheduled for round 7, but then played between rounds 8 and 9, it will be added to the standings for round 8.

Team ╲ Round	19	20	21	22	23	24	25	26	27	28
Jiangxi Dark Horse Junior	11	11	11	12	11	13	11	12	11	11
Ganzhou Ruishi	14	15	12	13	12	12	12	11	12	12
Beijing IT	13	12	13	14	16	11	13	13	14	13
Rizhao Yuqi	16	16	16	16	14	16	16	15	13	14
Tai'an Tiankuang	12	14	15	15	15	15	14	14	15	15
Hubei Istar	15	13	14	11	13	14	15	16	16	16
Guangxi Lanhang	17	17	17	17	17	17	17	17	17	17
Haikou Mingcheng	19	19	20	20	20	19	19	19	19	18
Xi'an Chongde Ronghai	20	20	19	19	19	20	20	20	20	19
Quanzhou Yassin	18	18	18	18	18	18	18	18	18	20

Source: Soccerway

=== Results by match played ===
Team ╲ Round	19	20	21	22	23	24	25	26	27	28
Beijing IT	L	W	L	W	L	W	L	D	L	D
Ganzhou Ruishi	W	D	W	D	W	D	D	W	L	D
Guangxi Lanhang	L	L	W	W	D	D	D	D	L	W
Haikou Mingcheng	W	D	D	L	L	W	L	W	W	W
Hubei Istar	L	W	D	W	L	D	D	L	L	L
Jiangxi Dark Horse Junior	W	D	L	D	W	L	W	L	W	W
Quanzhou Yassin	L	L	D	L	D	L	W	L	W	L
Rizhao Yuqi	W	D	D	D	W	D	L	W	W	L
Tai'an Tiankuang	W	D	L	D	D	W	W	L	L	L
Xi'an Chongde Ronghai	L	D	W	L	D	L	D	W	W	W

Source: Soccerway
W = Win; D = Draw; L = Loss

== Statistics ==
=== Top scorers ===
As of 20 October 2024

Note: Flags indicate national team as has been defined under FIFA eligibility rules. Players may hold more than one non-FIFA nationality.

Rank	Player	Club	Goals
1	(Japan) Xia Dalong	Guangdong GZ-Power	15
2	(China) Leng Jixuan	Ganzhou Ruishi	10
3	(China) Zhang Xiao	Guangxi Hengchen	9
3	(China) Tang Tianyi	Guangdong GZ-Power	9
5	(China) Men Yang	Shenzhen Juniors	8
5	(China) Yan Ge	Nantong Haimen Codion	8
5	(China) Hu Ming	Shenzhen Juniors	8
5	(China) Zhou Ziheng	Ganzhou Ruishi	8
5	(China) Huang Wenzheng	Hubei Istar	8
5	(China) Mirzat Ali	Dalian K'un City	8
5	(China) Yu Xueyi	Guangxi Lanhang	8
5	(China) Geng Taili	Jiangxi Dark Horse Junior	8
13	(China) Zhu Shiyu	Dalian K'un City	7
13	(China) Chen Long	Tai'an Tiankuang	7

==== Hat-tricks ====
Player	Club	Against	Result	Date
(China) Zhang Xiao	Guangxi Hengchen	Quanzhou Yassin	5–1 (H)	16 April 2024
(China) Men Yang	Shenzhen Juniors	Quanzhou Yassin	5–1 (A)	9 June 2024
(China) Tang Tianyi	Guangdong GZ-Power	Quanzhou Yassin	8–1 (H)	27 July 2024
(China) Sun Yue	Rizhao Yuqi	Haikou Mingcheng	3-1 (H)	16 September 2024

Notes

- (H) – Home team
- (A) – Away team

== Awards ==
=== Player of the Round ===
Player of the Round
Round	Player	Club	Ref.
1	(China) Chen Jidong	Beijing IT	
2	(China) Xie Zhiwei	Shaanxi Union	
3	(China) Tan Fucheng	Langfang Glory City	
4	(China) Mirzat Ali	Dalian K'un City	
5	(China) Zhang Xiao	Guangxi Hengchen	
6	(China) Mirzat Ali (2)	Dalian K'un City	
7	(China) Lu Yaohui	Hunan Billows	
8	(China) Leng Jixuan	Ganzhou Ruishi	
9	(China) Wei Chaolun	Langfang Glory City	
10	(China) Zheng Lei	Nantong Haimen Codion	
11	(China) Men Yang	Shenzhen Juniors	
12	(China) Yan Ge	Nantong Haimen Codion	
13	(China) Wei Chaolun (2)	Langfang Glory City	
14	(China) Xia Dalong	Guangdong GZ-Power	
15	(China) An Shuo	Langfang Glory City	
16	(China) Zhu Shiyu	Dalian K'un City	
17	(China) Men Yang (2)	Shenzhen Juniors	
18	(China) Tang Tianyi	Guangdong GZ-Power	
19	(China) Zhang Yuxuan	Guangxi Hengchen	
20	(China) Yan Shoukuan	Dalian K'un City	
21	(China) Qeyser Tursun	Hunan Billows	
22	(China) Xia Dalong (2)	Guangdong GZ-Power	
23	(China) Sun Yue	Rizhao Yuqi	
24	(China) Xia Dalong (3)	Guangdong GZ-Power	
25	(China) Li Xinxiang	Shanghai Port B	
26	(China) Tang Rui (China) Zhou Ziheng	Shandong Taishan B Ganzhou Ruishi	
27	(China) Jiang Zhe	Hunan Billows	
28	(China) Zhuang Jiajie	Ganzhou Ruishi	

=== Monthly awards ===
Month	Player of the Month		Manager of the Month		Young Player of the Month	
Month	Player	Club	Manager	Club	Player	Club
March/April	(China) Zhang Xiao	Guangxi Hengchen	(China) Li Bing	Guangdong GZ-Power	(China) Mirzat Ali	Dalian K'un City
May	(China) Liao Chongjiu	Shanghai Port B	(China) Li Bing	Guangdong GZ-Power	(China) Huang Wenzheng	Hubei Istar
June	(China) Men Yang	Shenzhen Juniors	(China) Lu Qiang	Nantong Haimen Codion	(China) Mei Shuaijun	Shandong Taishan B
July	(China) Tang Tianyi	Guangdong GZ-Power	(China) Li Bing	Guangdong GZ-Power	(China) Tang Tianyi	Guangdong GZ-Power
August	(China) Zhang Yuxuan	Guangxi Hengchen	(China) Chen Xufeng	Shanghai Port B	(China) Tan Jiaye	Haikou Mingcheng
September	(China) Xia Dalong	Guangdong GZ-Power	(China) Zhao Faqing	Dalian K'un City	(China) Wang Zhicheng	Hubei Istar

== League attendances ==
Pos	Team	Total	High	Low	Average	Change
1	Shaanxi Union	246,398	23,237	0	17,600	−22.3%^{†}
2	Guangxi Lanhang	99,600	16,074	0	7,114	+865.3%
3	Shandong Taishan B	54,639	10,680	1,363	3,903	n/a
4	Hunan Billows	44,633	12,846	1,018	3,188	−62.4%
5	Nantong Haimen Codion	41,755	7,168	566	2,983	+112.6%
6	Rizhao Yuqi	23,342	1,968	1,001	1,667	−6.3%^{†}
7	Xi'an Chongde Ronghai	21,775	13,865	0	1,555	+330.7%^{†}
8	Dalian K'un City	18,406	3,339	275	1,315	+520.3%^{†}
9	Tai'an Tiankuang	17,355	3,275	511	1,240	−58.3%
10	Langfang Glory City	15,172	2,321	521	1,084	+14.7%^{†}
11	Shenzhen Juniors	11,471	1,211	389	819	+131.4%^{†}
12	Guangdong GZ-Power	10,060	980	378	719	−72.1%^{†}
13	Ganzhou Ruishi	9,333	4,962	182	667	+135.7%
14	Guangxi Hengchen	7,956	1,623	68	568	+197.4%^{†}
15	Quanzhou Yassin	6,423	647	282	459	−53.0%
16	Beijing IT	5,434	523	189	388	+28.5%
17	Hubei Istar	3,926	1,218	108	280	−12.2%
18	Shanghai Port B	3,232	393	105	231	n/a
19	Haikou Mingcheng	1,777	281	0	127	−27.4%
20	Jiangxi Dark Horse Junior	1,343	368	28	96	−95.6%
	League total	644,030	23,237	0	2,300	−6.4%

Notes:
^{†} Teams played previous season in CMCL.
