= Mewlan Jappar =

Chinese footballer

Personal information
- Date of birth: 3 November 2001 (age 24)
- Place of birth: Urumqi, Xinjiang
- Height: 1.92 m (6 ft 4 in)
- Position: Goalkeeper

Team information
- Current team: Qingdao Hainiu
- Number: 43

Senior career*
Years	Team	Apps	(Gls)
2022	Kunshan FC	0	(0)
2023–2025	Jiangxi Dark Horse Junior / Wenzhou FC	52	(0)
2023	→ Chongqing Tonglianglong (loan)	0	(0)
2026–	Qingdao Hainiu	0	(0)
- * Club domestic league appearances and goals as of 27 July 2026

Mewlan Jappar (simplified Chinese: 买乌兰·加帕尔; traditional Chinese: 買烏蘭·加帕爾; pinyin: Mǎiwūlán Jiāpàěr; born 3 November 2001) is a Chinese professional footballer who plays as a goalkeeper for Chinese Super League club Qingdao Hainiu.

== Club career ==
=== Kunshan FC ===
On 10 May 2022, Mewlan Jappar was named in the first team squad of Kunshan FC for the 2022 season, wearing squad number 22.

=== Jiangxi Dark Horse Junior ===
In April 2023, Jappar joined Jiangxi Dark Horse Junior. He made his professional debut in the 2023 China League Two against Chongqing Tonglianglong. He made three appearances for Jiangxi Black Horse Youth in all competitions before being loaned out.

=== Chongqing Tonglianglong (loan) ===
On 28 July 2023, Jappar was loaned to Chongqing Tonglianglong until the end of the 2023 season. Chongqing Tonglianglong won the 2023 China League Two title and earned promotion to China League One.

=== Return to Jiangxi Black Horse Junior/ Wenzhou FC ===
After his loan spell ended, Jappar returned to Jiangxi Black Horse Youth. In the 2024 season, he made 22 appearances in China League Two, all as a starter. He was named as a candidate for the 2024 China League Two Best Goalkeeper award.

In 2025, Jiangxi Black Horse Youth relocated and was renamed Wenzhou FC. Jappar made 27 appearances in the 2025 China League Two, all as starts. In total, he made 52 appearances for the club across all competitions, keeping 18 clean sheets.

=== Qingdao Hainiu ===
On 28 February 2026, Qingdao Hainiu officially announced the signing of Jappar. He was assigned squad number 43. He was named in the matchday squad for Qingdao Hainiu's match against Shandong Taishan on 26 April 2026, remaining on the substitute bench.

== Career statistics ==
=== Club ===
As of 27 July 2026

Appearances and goals by club, season and competition
Club	Season	League			National Cup		Continental		Other		Total	
Club	Season	Division	Apps	Goals	Apps	Goals	Apps	Goals	Apps	Goals	Apps	Goals
Kunshan FC	2022	China League One	0	0	0	0	—		—		0	0
Jiangxi Dark Horse Junior	2023	China League Two	3	0	0	0	—		—		3	0
Chongqing Tonglianglong (loan)	2023	China League Two	0	0	0	0	—		—		0	0
Jiangxi Dark Horse Junior	2024	China League Two	22	0	0	0	—		—		22	0
Wenzhou FC	2025	China League Two	27	0	1	0	—		—		28	0
Qingdao Hainiu	2026	Chinese Super League	0	0	0	0	—		—		0	0
Career total			52	0	1	0	0	0	0	0	53	0

== Honours ==
Chongqing Tonglianglong

- China League Two: 2023
