= Li Siqi =

Li Siqi may refer to:

- Louise Lee (born 1950), or Louise Lee Si-kei, Hong Kong actress and newscaster
- Li Siqi (footballer) (born 1997), Chinese footballer
- Li Siqi (warlord), 14th-century warlord
