= Zhang Zijian =

Chinese footballer (born 1997)

Personal information
- Date of birth: 5 April 1997 (age 29)
- Place of birth: Yingkou, Liaoning, China
- Height: 1.88 m (6 ft 2 in)
- Position: Center back

Team information
- Current team: Guangxi Hengchen
- Number: 27

Youth career
- –2015: Shenyang Dongjin
- 2017–2019: Beijing Guoan

Senior career*
Years	Team	Apps	(Gls)
2020–2021	Changchun Yatai	2	(0)
2022	Ji'nan Xingzhou	6	(1)
2023	Shanxi Chongde Ronghai		
2025–	Guangxi Hengchen	23	(1)
- * Club domestic league appearances and goals as of 14:01, 5 May 2022 (UTC)

Zhang Zijian (Chinese: 张梓健; born 5 April 1997) is a Chinese footballer currently playing as a center back for Chinese club China League One club Guangxi Hengchen.

== Career statistics ==
=== Club ===
As of 12 August 2021.

Club	Season	League			Cup		Continental		Other		Total	
Club	Season	Division	Apps	Goals	Apps	Goals	Apps	Goals	Apps	Goals	Apps	Goals
Changchun Yatai	2020	China League One	2	0	0	0	–		0	0	2	0
Changchun Yatai	2021	Chinese Super League	0	0	0	0	–		0	0	0	0
Career total			2	0	0	0	0	0	0	0	2	0
