= Men Yang =

Chinese footballer

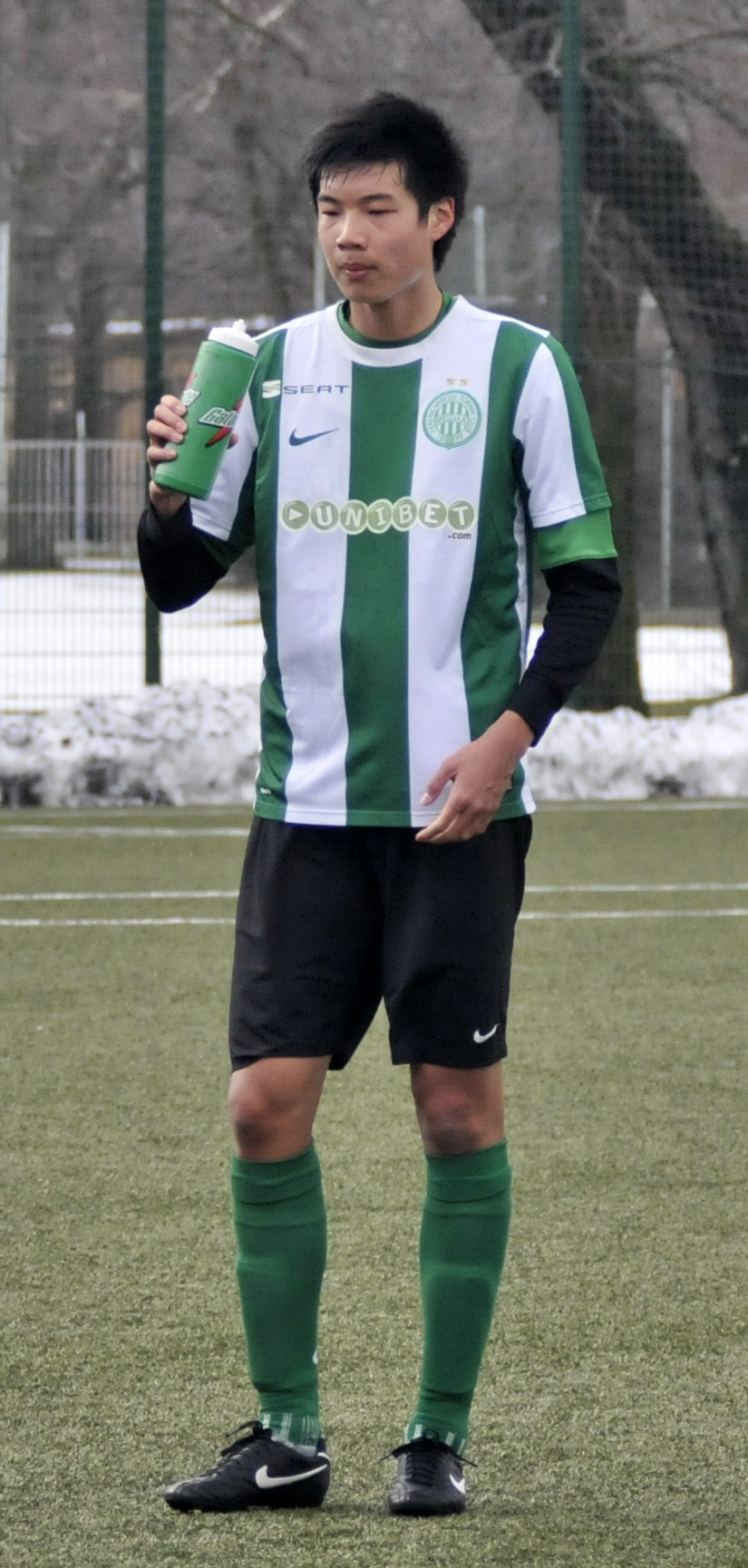

Personal information
- Date of birth: 20 February 1991 (age 35)
- Place of birth: Luoyang, Henan, China
- Height: 1.96 m (6 ft 5 in)
- Position: Striker

Team information
- Current team: Ningbo FC
- Number: 9

Youth career
- 2002–2008: Chengdu Blades
- 2009: Ferencváros

Senior career*
Years	Team	Apps	(Gls)
2009–2010	Ferencváros	0	(0)
2011	Changchun Yatai	1	(0)
2012–2015	Guangzhou R&F	1	(0)
2014	→ Yinchuan Helanshan (loan)	13	(2)
2016–2017	Lijiang Jiayunhao	32	(8)
2018	Shenzhen Ledman	9	(0)
2019–2020	Zibo Cuju	35	(12)
2021	Liaoning Shenyang Urban	30	(4)
2022–2023	Suzhou Dongwou	47	(12)
2024–2025	Shenzhen Juniors	28	(9)
2025	Wuxi Wugo	8	(0)
2026–	Ningbo Professional	0	(0)
- * Club domestic league appearances and goals as of 8 March 2026

Men Yang (Chinese: 门阳; born 20 February 1991 in Luoyang) is a Chinese football player who currently plays for China League One side Ningbo FC.

== Club career ==
His father is former footballer Men Wenfeng and he would start his football career with the Chengdu Blades youth team before going abroad where he joined Hungary football club Ferencváros. He would be promoted to the Ferencváros senior team in the 2009–10 Nemzeti Bajnokság I league season. The club did not extend his contract and Men Yang returned to China where on 25 March 2011 he joined top-tier club Changchun Yatai for the start of the 2011 Chinese Super League campaign. Under Head coach Shen Xiangfu he would make his debut in a league game on 21 August 2011 against Jiangsu Sainty F.C. in a 1–0 victory.

The following season he would join newly promoted team Guangzhou R&F on 11 February 2012. He would make his first appearance on 7 October 2012 against his former club Changchun Yatai in a league game that ended in a 2–1 defeat. After the game Men Yang struggled to establish himself within the team and did not represent the senior throughout the whole of the next season. To gain some playing time he was loaned out to third-tier football club Yinchuan Helanshan for the 2014 China League Two campaign.

In March 2016 Men Yang transferred to third-tier football club Lijiang Jiayunhao on a free transfer. In his debut season with the club they would go on to win the division title and promotion to the second tier at the end of the 2016 China League Two campaign. In the next league campaign he was unable to ensure the clubs survival within the league and they were relegated at the end of the 2017 China League One campaign.

He would join third-tier club Shenzhen Ledman for the 2018 China League Two league season, however they disbanded at the end of the campaign. He would be free to join Zibo Cuju for the 2019 China League Two season. His following season with the club would see them come runners-up and gain promotion into the second tier.

== Career statistics ==
As of 31 December 2025.

Appearances and goals by club, season and competition
Club	Season	League			National Cup		Continental		Other		Total	
Club	Season	Division	Apps	Goals	Apps	Goals	Apps	Goals	Apps	Goals	Apps	Goals
Ferencváros	2009–10	Nemzeti Bajnokság I	0	0	0	0	-		-		0	0
Changchun Yatai	2011	Chinese Super League	1	0	0	0	-		-		1	0
Guangzhou R&F	2012	Chinese Super League	1	0	0	0	-		-		1	0
Guangzhou R&F	2013	Chinese Super League	0	0	0	0	-		-		0	0
Guangzhou R&F	2015	Chinese Super League	0	0	0	0	0	0	-		0	0
Guangzhou R&F	Total		1	0	0	0	0	0	0	0	1	0
Yinchuan Helanshan (loan)	2014	China League Two	13	2	0	0	-		-		13	2
Lijiang Jiayunhao	2016	China League Two	12	2	3	1	-		-		15	3
Lijiang Jiayunhao	2017	China League One	20	6	1	0	-		-		21	6
Lijiang Jiayunhao	Total		32	8	4	1	0	0	0	0	36	9
Shenzhen Ledman F.C.	2018	China League Two	9	0	1	0	-		-		10	0
Zibo Cuju	2019	China League Two	23	10	2	1	-		-		25	11
Zibo Cuju	2020	China League Two	12	2	-		-		-		12	2
Zibo Cuju	Total		35	12	2	1	0	0	0	0	37	13
Liaoning Shenyang Urban	2021	China League One	30	4	0	0	-		-		30	4
Suzhou Dongwou	2022	China League One	28	11	1	0	-		-		29	11
Suzhou Dongwou	2023	China League One	19	1	2	0	-		-		21	1
Suzhou Dongwou	Total		47	12	3	0	0	0	0	0	50	12
Shenzhen Juniors	2024	China League Two	25	8	1	0	-		-		26	8
Shenzhen Juniors	2025	China League One	3	1	2	2	-		-		5	3
Shenzhen Juniors	Total		28	9	3	2	0	0	0	0	31	11
Wuxi Wugo	2025	China League Two	8	0	0	0	-		-		8	0
Career total			204	47	13	4	0	0	0	0	217	51

== Honours ==
=== Club ===
Lijiang Jiayunhao

- China League Two: 2016
