= Li Jinqing =

Chinese footballer (born 1997)

Personal information
- Date of birth: 5 January 1997 (age 29)
- Place of birth: Linfen, Shanxi, China
- Height: 1.80 m (5 ft 11 in)
- Positions: Central midfielder; left winger

Youth career
- –2018: Tourizense

Senior career*
Years	Team	Apps	(Gls)
2018–2021	Shenzhen FC	27	(1)
2020–2021	→ Villarrobledo (loan)	8	(0)
2021–2022	Villarrobledo	11	(0)
2022	Sichuan Jiuniu	6	(0)
2024–2025	Xi'an Chongde Ronghai	46	(0)
- * Club domestic league appearances and goals as of 11:48, 23 June 2024 (UTC)

Li Jinqing (simplified Chinese: 李晋庆; traditional Chinese: 李晉慶; pinyin: Lǐ Jìnqìng; born 5 January 1997) is a Chinese footballer who plays as a central midfielder or left winger.

== Club career ==
Li Jinqing signed with second tier football club Shenzhen FC on 27 February 2018 for the 2018 China League One season. He made his debut in a league game on 11 March 2018 against Heilongjiang Lava Spring F.C. that ended in a 2-2 draw. He would go on to establish himself as a regular within the team and go on to gain promotion with the club at the end of his first season with Shenzhen.

On 25 March 2022, Li transferred to China League One club Sichuan Jiuniu. He made his debut in a league game on 8 June 2022 against Xinjiang Tianshan Leopard F.C. that ended in a 2-0 victory. After a handful of games throughout the season his contract was not renewed and Li left the club after one season. On 2 March 2024 Li transferred to China League Two club Xi'an Chongde Ronghai.

== Career statistics ==
=== Club ===
As of 23 June 2024.

Club	Season	League			Cup		Continental		Other		Total	
Club	Season	Division	Apps	Goals	Apps	Goals	Apps	Goals	Apps	Goals	Apps	Goals
Shenzhen FC	2018	China League One	18	1	1 (Note: Appearances in the Chinese FA Cup)	0	–		–		19	1
Shenzhen FC	2019	Chinese Super League	9	0	0	0	–		–		9	0
Shenzhen FC	2020	Chinese Super League	0	0	0	0	–		–		0	0
Shenzhen FC	2021	Chinese Super League	0	0	0	0	–		–		0	0
Shenzhen FC	Total		27	1	1	0	0	0	0	0	28	1
CP Villarrobledo (loan)	2020–21	Segunda División B	8	0	0	0	–		–		8	0
CP Villarrobledo	2021–22	Tercera Federación	11	0	–		–		–		11	0
Sichuan Jiuniu	2022	China League One	6	0	1	0	–		–		7	0
Xi'an Chongde Ronghai	2024	China League Two	13	0	1	1	–		–		14	1
Career total			65	1	3	1	0	0	0	0	68	2
