= Cheng Xiaopeng =

Chinese footballer

Cheng Xiaopeng 程晓鹏
Personal information
- Full name: Cheng Xiaopeng
- Date of birth: April 14, 1985 (age 41)
- Place of birth: Jinan, Shandong, China
- Height: 1.88 m (6 ft 2 in)
- Position: Goalkeeper

Team information
- Current team: Guangxi Hengchen (goalkeeping coach)

Youth career
- 2000–2003: Bayi Football Team

Senior career*
Years	Team	Apps	(Gls)
2004–2011	Nanchang Bayi Hengyuan	29	(4)

Managerial career
- 2020: Suzhou Dongwu (goalkeeping)
- 2023–2024: Langfang Glory City (goalkeeping)
- 2025–: Guangxi Hengchen (goalkeeping)
- * Club domestic league appearances and goals as of 2012-07-17

Cheng Xiaopeng (simplified Chinese: 程晓鹏; traditional Chinese: 程曉鵬; pinyin: Chéng Xiǎopéng; born 14 April 1985), is a Chinese football coach and retired footballer, who played as a goalkeeper. He scored 4 goals in his professional goalkeeper career, all came from penalty kicks (three in the Chinese Super League and one in the China League One).

== Club career ==
Cheng Xiaopeng was born in Jinan, Shandong where he initially started out as a forward with his good friend and fellow footballer Han Peng who was at the Shandong Luneng youth team. Cheng would soon move to the Bayi youth team where the team's Head coach Pei Encai would move him into the goalkeeping position. As this was going on the Bayi Football Team was being taken over by Shanghai Hengyuan Football Club and the club was renamed as Nanchang Bayi Hengyuan by 2003. At the new club he would gradually break into the senior team and go on to be part of the squad that won the 2005 Chinese league two division title. After several years playing within the second tier he would eventually become the club's first-choice goalkeeper by the 2009 league season, however he was only limited to sixteen appearances throughout the campaign as his emotional behaviour often saw him dropped especially as his bad temper saw him lash out at the oppositions fans on August 21, 2009, in a game against Liaoning Whowin that saw him banned for two games on August 23, 2009.

Cheng's flamboyant behaviour on the field would go on to see him become his club's first goalkeeper to actually score a goal when on October 14, 2009, he scored a penalty kick in a league game against Beijing BIT in a 3–1 victory. This was followed up by the club winning promotion to the top tier after they came runners-up to Liaoning Whowin at the end of the season. With Cheng remaining in goal at the start of the 2010 Chinese Super League season he would continue to showcase his goalscoring abilities when on April 3, 2010, he scored another penalty kick, this time against Shanghai Shenhua in a 2–1 defeat, however he walked away with the distinction of being the first ever goalkeeper to score in the Chinese Super League. As the season continued Nanchang Hengyuan would be dragged into a relegation battle and while Cheng actually added to goalscoring tally he wasn't keeping many clean sheets and was soon dropped from the team as they survived relegation and finished thirteenth before the club decided to release him in 2011.

== Honours ==
Nanchang Bayi Hengyuan

- China League Two: 2005
