= Shanxi Chongde Ronghai F.C. =

Association football club in China

Shanxi Chongde Ronghai
- Full name: Shanxi Chongde Ronghai Football Club 山西崇德荣海足球俱乐部
- Founded: January 2021; 5 years ago
- Chairman: Yang Xiaolong
- Manager: Cao Rui
- League: China League Two
- 2025: China League Two, 18th of 24
Home colours	Away colours

Shanxi Chongde Ronghai Football Club (Chinese: 山西崇德荣海足球俱乐部; pinyin: Shānxī Chóngdé Rónghǎi Zúqiú Jùlèbù) is a Chinese professional football club based in Taiyuan, Shanxi, that competes in China League Two, the third tier of Chinese football. Founded in 2021 as Xi'an Ronghai Football Club, the club changed its name to Xi'an Chongde Ronghai Football Club in 2023, when they were promoted from the Chinese Champions League to the China League Two. In June 2024, they moved to Yan'an and changed their name to Yan'an Ronghai Football Club. The club relocated to Taiyuan, Shanxi in February 2025, and changed to their current name.

== History ==
Xi'an Chongde Ronghai logo used between 2023 and 2024

Xi'an Ronghai Football Club was founded in January 2021 by Yang Xiaolong, the owner of the now-defunct Xi'an Wolves, registering as a member of the Xi'an Football Association. In May 2021, they participated in the Xi'an FA Cup, and after winning five matches out of a possible five, they were crowned winners, becoming eligible to compete in the 2021 Chinese Champions League (CMCL). In the regional competition, Xi'an Ronghai topped their respective group, grabbing two wins and a draw, which set up a place in a play-off to progress into the final round. After beating local opponent Xi'an Hi-Tech Yilian on penalties, the club advanced into the final sixteen. They were drawn into Group C which consisted of Jinan Xingzhou, Jiangsu Zhongnan Codion, and Yuxi Yukun Steel, Xi'an Ronghai finished bottom, putting an end to the season, ranked 16th. In the 2022 CMCL season, Xi'an Ronghai finished second in their respective group, but were knocked out by Tianjin Fusheng in the elimination play-off round. By April 2023, the club rebranded its name to Xi'an Chongde Ronghai Football Club. They were slotted into the Changzhi region, where, after picking up three wins, one draw, and a loss to Langfang Glory City, they progressed into the final round. After the seventh match against Shenzhen Juniors that could have seen Ronghai jump to first place and subsequently win promotion, Xi'an Chongde Ronghai finished in second place, entering the promotion play-offs. On 21 October 2023, Ronghai hosted Guangxi Hengchen in the first round, which ended in a loss for Ronghai through a penalty shoot-out, missing out on promotion. By 6 February 2024, Xi'an Chongde Ronghai were not included in the initial list of teams in the 2024 China League Two. However, Xi'an Chongde Ronghai were confirmed a spot on 22 February, a few days after Jinan Xingzhou announced its dissolution. During this period on 20 February, the club appointed Wu Yan as their new head coach.

Xi'an Chongde Ronghai logo that was supposed to be used in 2025 before the move to Shanxi

On 15 March 2024, a week before the upcoming China League Two season, Xi'an Chongde Ronghai announced that they would use Shaanxi Province Stadium as their home ground, groundsharing with fellow China League Two club Shaanxi Union, who they form a Shaanxi derby in the professional leagues with, for the first time in twenty years in Shaanxi football history. On 5 April 2024, in a 2–2 league draw with Dalian K'un City, Gong Zheng scored the club's first professional goal. On 11 April 2024, after a single home league game, Xi'an Chongde Ronghai reached out to the public to resolve issues with their home ground, as they could not remain financially stable if they kept using Shaanxi Province Stadium. By 15 April, the club started using Xi'an Olympic Sports Center as their home ground. Shortly after a home league match against Langfang Glory City on 11 May which took place at Fengdong Football Park, on 14 May, the league announced that home matches for the rest of the season will take place at the Yan'an National Fitness Center, in Yan'an, Shaanxi, which was previously not an option, as Xi'an Chongde Ronghai were registered in the Xi'an Football Association, a city-based regional football association, and a move outside of city limits was not permitted. On 22 May, the club announced a change to its name, Yan'an Ronghai Football Club, and unveiled its new club badge, in anticipation of finalising a permanent move to Yan'an after the end of the 2024 season.

== Players ==
=== First-team squad ===
As of August 2025

Note: Flags indicate national team as defined under FIFA eligibility rules; some limited exceptions apply. Players may hold more than one non-FIFA nationality.

No.	Pos.	Nation	Player
1	GK	CHN	Rong Shang
2	FW	CHN	Ye Qian
3	DF	CHN	Zheng Yiming
5	MF	CHN	Wu Peng
6	DF	CHN	Zhang Wei
7	MF	CHN	Li Jinqing
8	MF	CHN	Li Zhongting
9	FW	CHN	Gong Zheng
10	MF	CHN	Li Diantong
15	MF	CHN	Huang Zhiyuan
16	MF	CHN	Wang Jiaqi
17	MF	CHN	Iminjan Ilhamjan
18	DF	CHN	Li Xiaohan
19	DF	CHN	Jin Jian
21	GK	CHN	Bai Shuo
22	MF	CHN	Yu Xueyi
23	DF	CHN	Zhang Ao

No.	Pos.	Nation	Player
26	DF	CHN	Ma Sheng
28	DF	CHN	Wang Hanlin
30	DF	CHN	Zhang Song
31	FW	CHN	Tan Tiancheng
33	MF	CHN	Liu Tianyang
35	MF	CHN	Bai Xuyao
36	FW	CHN	Yan Tianyi
37	MF	CHN	Su Shun
42	GK	CHN	Teng Hui
43	MF	CHN	Muqamet Abdugheni
45	DF	CHN	Zheng Jinyang
46	MF	CHN	Yao Younan
47	DF	CHN	Faruk Ablimit
51	DF	CHN	Hu Binrong
52	MF	CHN	Kong Lingyi
55	GK	CHN	Gao Rongze
56	DF	CHN	Li Zeyu
58	DF	CHN	Zhang Hanwen

== Managerial staff ==
Position	Staff
Manager	(China) Cao Rui
