= Lü Shihao =

Chinese footballer (born 2002)

Personal information
- Date of birth: 16 July 2002 (age 24)
- Place of birth: Zhoukou, Henan, China
- Height: 1.78 m (5 ft 10 in)
- Position: Midfielder

Team information
- Current team: Wenzhou FC
- Number: 11

Youth career
- Villarreal
- Evergrande Football School
- 2020–2021: Lleida Esportiu

Senior career*
Years	Team	Apps	(Gls)
2021–2023	Guangzhou FC	2	(0)
2024–	Wenzhou FC	13	(2)
- * Club domestic league appearances and goals as of 14:01, 31 January 2023 (UTC)

Lü Shihao (Chinese: 吕世豪; born 16 July 2002) is a Chinese footballer currently playing as a midfielder for Wenzhou FC

== Club career ==
Having played for the Evergrande Football School, Lü moved to Spain to join Lleida Esportiu alongside teammate Lu Qi in November 2020.

== Career statistics ==
=== Club ===
As of 31 January 2023.

Appearances and goals by club, season and competition
Club	Season	League			Cup		Continental		Other		Total	
Club	Season	Division	Apps	Goals	Apps	Goals	Apps	Goals	Apps	Goals	Apps	Goals
Guangzhou FC	2021	Chinese Super League	0	0	1 (Note: Appearances in the Chinese FA Cup)	0	2 (Note: Appearances in the AFC Champions League)	0	0	0	1	0
Guangzhou FC	2022	Chinese Super League	0	0	0	0	3	0	0	0	1	0
Career total			0	0	1	0	5	0	0	0	6	0
