= Wuyuan Sports Centre =

Sports venue in Shangrao, China

- 婺源县体育中心
- Interactive map of Wuyuan Sports Centre
- Location: Wuyuan County, Shangrao, Jiangxi, China
- Coordinates: 29.290262°N 117.866195°E
- Owner: Wuyuan County Government
- Operator: Jiangxi Provincial Sports Bureau
- Capacity: 12,000 (stadium); 3,000 (gymnasium); 1,500 (swimming pool)

Construction
- Groundbreaking: March 2018
- Opened: 2021
- Cost: ¥560 million
- Architect: Jiangxi Provincial Architectural Design Institute

Tenant
- Jiangxi Dark Horse Junior (2024)

Wuyuan Sports Centre is a multi-purpose sports and cultural complex located in Wuyuan County, Shangrao, Jiangxi Province, China. Completed in 2021, it serves as a hub for regional sports competitions, cultural events, and tourism integration. The complex is noted for its eco-friendly design and role in promoting rural revitalization through sports. The Wuyuan Sports Centre was constructed under China's National Fitness Program to meet National Class B Sports Venue Standards. Spanning 200,000 square meters, it integrates modern sports infrastructure with Wuyuan County's renowned natural landscapes, including its iconic rapeseed flower fields.

== Facilities ==
The complex includes:

- A 12,000-seat outdoor stadium for football, athletics, and concerts.
- A 3,000-seat indoor gymnasium for basketball, badminton, and cultural performances.
- A 1,500-seat Olympic-standard swimming pool.
- A 500-bed athlete training base.
- Outdoor jogging trails and green spaces designed to blend with the surrounding countryside.

== History ==
Approved in 2017, the project broke ground in March 2018 and was completed in 2021 with a total investment of ¥560 million. Its construction aimed to address the lack of large-scale sports infrastructure in rural Jiangxi while leveraging Wuyuan's status as a AAAAA-rated tourist attraction.

== Tourism impact ==
As part of Wuyuan County’s "sports + tourism" strategy, the centre attracts over 1.3 million visitors annually. It is often promoted alongside local attractions like Jiangling Scenic Area and Wangkou Village.
