= Zhang Wei (footballer, born 1988) =

Chinese association football player

Personal information
- Date of birth: 31 March 1988 (age 38)
- Place of birth: Shandong, China
- Height: 1.79 m (5 ft 10 in)
- Position: Left-back

Team information
- Current team: Xi'an Chongde Ronghai
- Number: 6

Senior career*
Years	Team	Apps	(Gls)
2011–2016	Tianjin Tianhai	55	(2)
2017–2018	Yanbian Funde	16	(0)
2019–2021	Kunshan FC	28	(1)
2023–	Xi'an Chongde Ronghai	21	(2)
- * Club domestic league appearances and goals as of 14:01, 11 October 2024 (UTC)

Zhang Wei (Chinese: 张炜; born 31 March 1988) is a Chinese footballer currently playing as a left-back for Xi'an Chongde Ronghai.

== Club career ==
Zhang Wei started his professional career with second tier side Tianjin Quanjian (later renamed to Tianjin Tianhai). After several seasons he established himself as an integral member of the team that won the division at the end of 2016 China League One campaign and gain promotion to the top tier. On 19 January 2017 he transferred to top tier team Yanbian Funde. He did not make any appearances throughout the season as the club was relegated at the end of 2017 Chinese Super League campaign. The following season he established himself as a regular with the team, however on 26 February 2019, Yanbian Funde was dissolved due to owing taxes.

On 17 June 2019, Zhang joined third tier club Kunshan FC on a free transfer and in his debut season, despite the team only coming in ninth, were able to gain promotion at the end of the 2019 China League Two campaign due to it being an expansion season. After three seasons he left the club. On 3 April 2023, Zhang joined fourth tier club Xi'an Chongde Ronghai and in his debut season with them was able to assist them in gaining promotion at the end of the 2023 Chinese Champions League campaign.

== Career statistics ==
As of 11 October 2024.

Club	Season	League			Cup		Other		Total	
Club	Season	Division	Apps	Goals	Apps	Goals	Apps	Goals	Apps	Goals
Tianjin Tianhai	2011	China League One	0	0	1	0	0	0	1	0
Tianjin Tianhai	2012	China League One	0	0	0	0	0	0	0	0
Tianjin Tianhai	2013	China League One	0	0	0	0	0	0	0	0
Tianjin Tianhai	2014	China League One	10	0	1	0	0	0	11	0
Tianjin Tianhai	2015	China League One	28	2	0	0	0	0	28	2
Tianjin Tianhai	2016	China League One	17	0	5	0	0	0	22	0
Tianjin Tianhai	Total		55	2	7	0	0	0	62	2
Yanbian Funde	2017	Chinese Super League	0	0	0	0	0	0	0	0
Yanbian Funde	2018	China League One	16	0	0	0	0	0	16	0
Yanbian Funde	Total		16	0	0	0	0	0	16	0
Kunshan FC	2019	China League Two	8	1	0	0	2 (Note: Appearances in the China League Two playoffs)	0	10	1
Kunshan FC	2020	China League One	2	0	0	0	0	0	2	0
Kunshan FC	2021	China League One	18	0	0	0	0	0	18	0
Kunshan FC	Total		28	1	0	0	2	0	31	1
Xi'an Chongde Ronghai	2023	Chinese Champions League	–		1	0	0	0	1	0
Xi'an Chongde Ronghai	2024	China League Two	21	2	2	0	0	0	23	2
Xi'an Chongde Ronghai	Total		23	2	3	0	0	0	126	2
Career total			120	5	10	0	2	0	132	5

== Honours ==
Tianjin Quanjian

- China League One: 2016
