= Wenhe Sports Park Football Stadium =

Football stadium in Tai'an, Shandong, China

- Full name: Wenhe Sports Park Football Stadium
- Location: Beiwang Village, Culai Town, Tai'an, Shandong, China
- Capacity: 2,500
- Surface: Natural grass

Construction
- Built: 2024–2025
- Opened: April 2, 2025

Tenant
- Tai'an Tiankuang Football Club (2025–present)

Wenhe Sports Park Football Stadium is a professional football stadium located in Beiwang Village, Culai Town, Tai'an, Shandong Province, China. It officially opened on April 2, 2025, and serves as the home stadium for Tai'an Tiankuang Football Club in the Chinese League Two.

== Construction and facilities ==
The first phase of Wenhe Sports Park Football Stadium was completed in early 2025. The stadium passed inspection and certification by the Chinese Football Association (CFA), meeting the requirements for hosting professional League Two matches. The venue features CFA-certified natural grass turf, professional-grade LED lighting systems, and standard locker rooms and medical facilities. The stadium is equipped with seating systems and electronic display screens that comply with League Two standards.

The broader Wenhe Sports Complex project includes additional facilities. Phase I comprises two outdoor football fields, while Phase II includes indoor training facilities and athlete apartments, currently under construction. In 2025, the complex planned to invest 300 million yuan in developing training complexes and athlete recovery centers.

== History and home team ==
Previously, Tai'an Tiankuang played their home matches at Taishan Stadium. After considering various factors, the club decided to construct their own dedicated stadium.

On April 2, 2025, the Chinese League Two management officially approved Tai'an Tiankuang's request to relocate their home stadium to Wenhe Sports Park Football Stadium. The team had already begun training at the new venue in March 2025 to familiarize themselves with the playing conditions.

The stadium's inaugural professional match took place on April 5, 2025, when Tai'an Tiankuang hosted Changchun Xidu in the first round of the 2025 Chinese League Two season. By early May 2025, the stadium had already hosted four home matches for Tai'an Tiankuang.
