= Lobsang Khedrup =

Chinese footballer

Personal information
- Date of birth: 9 October 2000 (age 26)
- Place of birth: Kunming, Yunnan, China
- Height: 1.81 m (5 ft 11 in)
- Position: Midfielder

Team information
- Current team: Guangxi Hengchen
- Number: 23

Senior career*
Years	Team	Apps	(Gls)
2018–2020	Gondomar B	0	(0)
2021–2022	Hubei Istar	26	(0)
2023–2025	Yanbian Longding	24	(0)
2026–	Guangxi Hengchen	0	(0)
- * Club domestic league appearances and goals as of 8 March 2026

Lobsang Khedrup (Chinese: 鲁茸锴翥; pinyin: Lǔróng Kǎizhù; born 9 October 2000) is a Chinese professional footballer who plays as a midfielder for China League One club Guangxi Hengchen.

== Club career ==
In 2018, Khedrup signed for Portuguese side Gondomar B. In 2021, he signed for Hubei Istar in China. On 7 July 2021, he debuted for Hubei Istar during a 0-3 loss to Guangxi Pingguo Haliao. In March 2023, Khedrup joined Yanbian Longding on a free transfer.

== Career statistics ==
As of match played 22 July 2023

Appearances and goals by club, season and competition
Club	Season	League			National Cup		Continental		Other		Total	
Club	Season	Division	Apps	Goals	Apps	Goals	Apps	Goals	Apps	Goals	Apps	Goals
Gondomar	2018–19	Campeonato de Portugal	0	0	0	0	—		—		0	0
Gondomar	2019–20	Campeonato de Portugal	0	0	0	0	—		—		0	0
Gondomar	2020–21	Campeonato de Portugal	0	0	0	0	—		—		0	0
Gondomar	Total		0	0	0	0	0	0	0	0	0	0
Hubei Istar	2021	China League Two	11	0	1	0	—		—		12	0
Hubei Istar	2022	China League Two	15	0	0	0	—		—		15	0
Hubei Istar	Total		26	0	1	0	0	0	0	0	27	0
Yanbian Longding	2023	China League One	8	0	2	0	—		—		10	0
Career total			34	0	3	0	0	0	0	0	37	0
