= 2025 China League Two =

China League Two
- Season: 2025
- Dates: 22 March – 26 October 2025
- Champions: Guangxi Hengchen
- Promoted: Guangxi Hengchen; Wuxi Wugo
- Relegated: Kunming City; Quanzhou Yassin; Guangxi Lanhang
- Matches: 360
- Goals: 812 (2.26 per match)
- Top goalscorer: Fei Ernanduo (24 goals)
- Highest attendance: 31,569; Guizhou Zhucheng Athletic 0–0 Kunming City (22 March 2025)
- Lowest attendance: 0 Kunming City 1–1 Ganzhou Ruishi (4 April 2025); Kunming City 1–0 Quanzhou Yassin (8 April 2025); Kunming City 1–0 Wenzhou (8 June 2025)
- Total attendance: 701,855
- Average attendance: 2,437

The 2025 China Resources Beverage Chinese Football League 2 (Chinese: 2025华润饮料中国足球乙级联赛) was the 36th season of China League Two, the third tier of the Chinese football league pyramid, since its establishment in 1989.

== Clubs ==
=== Club changes ===
==== To League Two ====
Teams promoted from 2024 Chinese Champions League

- Shenzhen 2028
- Guizhou Zhucheng Athletic
- Guangdong Mingtu
- Guangzhou Alpha
- Changchun Xidu

Teams promoted from 2024 CFA U-21 League

- Wuhan Three Towns B
- Chengdu Rongcheng B

Teams relegated from 2024 China League One

- Wuxi Wugo
- Jiangxi Lushan

==== From League Two ====
Teams promoted to 2025 China League One

- Guangdong GZ-Power
- Dalian K'un City
- Shenzhen Juniors
- Shaanxi Union

Disqualified entries

- ~~Hunan Billows~~

=== Name changes ===
- Guangzhou Alpha F.C. changed their name to Guangzhou Dandelion Alpha in December 2024.
- Xi'an Chongde Ronghai F.C.'s name change to Yan'an Ronghai was put into effect in January 2025.
- Rizhao Yuqi F.C. relocated to Lanzhou, Gansu, and changed their name to Lanzhou Longyuan Athletic in February 2025.
- Langfang Glory City F.C. relocated to Hangzhou, Zhejiang, and changed their name to Hangzhou Linping Wuyue in February 2025.
- Haikou Mingcheng F.C. relocated to Kunming, Yunnan, and changed their name to Kunming City in February 2025.
- Jiangxi Dark Horse Junior F.C. relocated to Wenzhou, Zhejiang, and changed their name to Wenzhou in February 2025.
- Yan'an Ronghai F.C. relocated to Taiyuan, Shanxi, and changed their name to Shanxi Chongde Ronghai in February 2025.

=== Stadiums and locations ===
Locations of the 2025 China League Two teams
North Group South Group
Locations of the 2025 China League Two in Guangdong

Team	Head coach	City	Stadium	Capacity	2024 season
Wuxi Wugo ^{R}	(South Korea) Kim Bong-gil	Wuxi	Wuxi Sports Center	28,800	CL1, 15th
Wuxi Wugo ^{R}	(South Korea) Kim Bong-gil	Wuxi	Jiangyin Sports Centre (Jiangyin)	30,161	CL1, 15th
Wuxi Wugo ^{R}	(South Korea) Kim Bong-gil	Wuxi	Yixing Sports Center (Yixing)		CL1, 15th
Jiangxi Lushan ^{R}	(China) Wang Weijia	Ruichang	Ruichang Sports Park Stadium	13,188	CL1, 16th
Hangzhou Linping Wuyue	(China) Xu Lei	Hangzhou	Linping Sports Centre Stadium	10,200	5th
Shandong Taishan B	(China) Han Peng	Jinan	Zoucheng Sports Centre Stadium (Zoucheng)	30,000	6th
Guangxi Hengchen	(China) Liu Junwei	Nanning	Nanning Sports School Wuhe Campus Stadium		7th
Guangxi Hengchen	(China) Liu Junwei	Nanning	Guangxi Sports Center	60,000	
Shanghai Port B	(China) Chen Xufeng	Shanghai	Lingang Football Complex Sports Center	2,300	9th
Nantong Haimen Codion	(China) Lu Qiang	Nantong	Haimen Sports Centre	10,000	10th
Wenzhou	(Macau) Carlos Leonel	Wenzhou	Wenzhou Sports Centre	14,865	11th
Ganzhou Ruishi	(Serbia) Dragan Stančić	Ganzhou	Dingnan Youth Football Training Center (Dingnan)	12,000	12th
Ganzhou Ruishi	(Serbia) Dragan Stančić	Ganzhou	Ganzhou Fitness Center	40,000	12th
Beijing IT	(China) Yu Fei	Beijing	BIT Eastern Athletic Field	5,000	13th
Lanzhou Longyuan Athletic	(South Korea) Shin Hong-gi	Lanzhou	Lanzhou Olympic Center Stadium	60,000	14th
Tai'an Tiankuang	(China) Yuan Weiwei	Tai'an	Wenhe Sports Park Football Stadium	2,500	15th
Hubei Istar	(China) Gao Feng	Wuhan	Hubei Sports Bureau Football Administration Center Football Field	2,000	16th
Guangxi Lanhang	(China) Gong Lei	Laibin	Baise Sports Center Stadium (Baise)	20,000	17th
Guangxi Lanhang	(China) Gong Lei	Laibin	Jiuling Lake Football Training Centre Field 1 (Guigang)		17th
Kunming City	(Germany) Michael Weiß	Kunming	Kehua Football Center Field 2		18th
Kunming City	(Germany) Michael Weiß	Kunming	Kehua Football Center Sky Stadium	10,000	18th
Shenzhen 2028 ^{P}	(China) Wang Baoshan	Shenzhen	Shenzhen Youth Football Training Base Centre Stadium	10,000	CMCL, 1st
Shenzhen 2028 ^{P}	(China) Wang Baoshan	Shenzhen	Shenzhen Youth Football Training Base Field 1		CMCL, 1st
Guizhou Zhucheng Athletic ^{P}	(Spain) Óscar Céspedes	Guiyang	Guiyang Olympic Sports Center	51,636	CMCL, 2nd
Guizhou Zhucheng Athletic ^{P}	(Spain) Óscar Céspedes	Guiyang	Zunyi Olympic Sports Centre Stadium	40,000	CMCL, 2nd
Guangdong Mingtu ^{P}	(Japan) Tsutomu Takahata	Guangzhou (Huadu)	Huadu Stadium	13,394	CMCL, 3rd
Guangzhou Dandelion Alpha ^{P}	(China) Tan Ende	Guangzhou (Zengcheng)	Zengcheng Stadium	12,000	CMCL, 4th
Wuhan Three Towns B ^{P}	(China) Jiang Kun	Wuhan	Hankou Cultural Sports Centre	20,000	U-21, 1st
Chengdu Rongcheng B ^{P}	(China) Xu Jianye	Chengdu	Shuangliu Sports Centre	26,000	U-21, 2nd
Shanxi Chongde Ronghai	(China) Yu Ming	Taiyuan	Taiyuan University Football Field	2,257	19th
Quanzhou Yassin	(China) Yang Xiaoqi	Jinjiang	Jinjiang Football Training Center	8,000	20th
Changchun Xidu ^{P}	(China) Li Bin	Changchun	Yatai Training Center Main Stadium	7,000	CMCL, 5th

== North Group ==
=== League table ===
Pos	Team	Pld	W	D	L	GF	GA	GD	Pts	Qualification
1	Wuxi Wugo	22	13	6	3	31	14	+17	45	Qualification for Promotion stage
2	Shandong Taishan B	22	10	9	3	36	22	+14	39	Qualification for Promotion stage
3	Nantong Haimen Codion	22	10	8	4	38	24	+14	38 (Note: Nantong Haimen Codion finished ahead of Changchun Xidu on head-to-head points: Nantong Haimen Codion 0–0 Changchun Xidu, Changchun Xidu 0–1 Nantong Haimen Codion)	Qualification for Promotion stage
4	Changchun Xidu	22	10	8	4	19	11	+8	38	Qualification for Promotion stage
5	Jiangxi Lushan	22	10	5	7	25	22	+3	35	Qualification for Relegation stage
6	Hangzhou Linping Wuyue	22	8	8	6	24	26	−2	32	Qualification for Relegation stage
7	Tai'an Tiankuang	22	7	5	10	22	25	−3	26	Qualification for Relegation stage
8	Shanghai Port B	22	6	7	9	25	26	−1	25	Qualification for Relegation stage
9	Shanxi Chongde Ronghai	22	5	8	9	17	32	−15	23	Qualification for Relegation stage
10	Lanzhou Longyuan Athletic	22	5	7	10	21	32	−11	22	Qualification for Relegation stage
11	Beijing IT	22	5	2	15	21	29	−8	17	Qualification for Relegation stage
12	Hubei Istar	22	3	7	12	23	39	−16	16	Qualification for Relegation stage

Source: Soccerway
Rules for classification:
- During season: 1) Points; 2) Head-to-head points; 3) Head-to-head goal difference; 4) Head-to-head goals scored; 5) Goal difference; 6) Goals scored; 7) Rankings in the previous season. (Rules 2 to 4 are only applied when teams concerned have finished both/all the matches against others.)
- After season: 1) Points; 2) Head-to-head points; 3) Head-to-head goal difference; 4) Head-to-head goals scored; 5) Goal difference; 6) Goals scored; 7) Disciplinary points (yellow card = 1 point, red card = 3 points); 8) Drawing of lots.
  Notes:

=== Results ===
Home \ Away	BIT	CCX	HLW	HBI	JXL	LLA	NHC	SDT	SHP	SCR	TAT	WXW
Beijing IT	—	0–1	2–3	2–0	0–1	2–0	2–3	1–1	2–0	0–2	0–1	0–1
Changchun Xidu	1–0	—	0–0	1–0	0–1	1–1	0–1	2–0	1–1	2–0	1–0	2–0
Hangzhou Linping Wuyue	2–1	1–0	—	0–3	1–1	1–3	2–0	0–1	1–0	2–0	2–2	1–1
Hubei Istar	3–0	1–3	1–1	—	1–1	2–3	0–0	1–2	0–2	0–0	1–3	1–4
Jiangxi Lushan	1–1	0–0	1–2	2–4	—	2–0	0–2	1–3	1–0	1–1	2–0	1–0
Lanzhou Longyuan Athletic	0–2	0–1	1–1	2–0	0–2	—	1–1	0–2	1–1	3–2	1–2	1–2
Nantong Haimen Codion	3–1	0–0	3–1	2–2	4–1	0–0	—	4–4	1–1	7–0	1–0	2–0
Shandong Taishan B	1–0	4–1	3–0	0–0	2–0	2–2	2–2	—	1–2	1–1	4–1	1–1
Shanghai Port B	0–3	0–0	1–2	2–2	0–1	1–2	1–0	2–0	—	5–0	2–1	1–2
Shanxi Chongde Ronghai	2–1	0–0	0–0	5–1	0–3	2–0	1–0	1–1	0–0	—	0–0	0–3
Tai'an Tiankuang	2–1	1–2	1–1	2–0	0–2	3–0	0–1	0–1	1–1	1–0	—	1–2
Wuxi Wugo	1–0	0–0	1–0	2–0	1–0	0–0	5–1	0–0	4–2	1–0	0–0	—

Source: Soccerway
Legend: Blue = home team win; Yellow = draw; Red = away team win.
For upcoming matches, an "a" indicates there is an article about the rivalry between the two participants.

=== Positions by round ===
To preserve chronological evolvements, any postponed matches are not included to the round at which they were originally scheduled, but added to the full round they were played immediately afterwards. For example, if a match is scheduled for round 7, but then played between rounds 8 and 9, it will be added to the standings for round 8.

Team ╲ Round	1	2	3	4	5	6	7	8	9	10	11	12	13	14	15	16	17	18	19	20	21	22
Wuxi Wugo	3	3	2	2	2	2	2	1	2	1	1	1	1	1	1	1	1	1	1	1	1	1
Shandong Taishan B	4	6	4	5	3	4	5	4	6	5	4	4	4	4	4	4	4	3	2	4	4	2
Nantong Haimen Codion	5	7	9	8	8	10	6	6	4	3	2	2	2	2	3	3	3	4	4	2	2	3
Changchun Xidu	1	2	1	1	1	1	1	2	1	2	3	3	3	3	2	2	2	2	3	3	3	4
Jiangxi Lushan	6	4	6	3	5	5	4	3	5	6	6	6	6	5	5	5	5	5	5	5	5	5
Hangzhou Linping Wuyue	7	5	5	6	4	6	7	7	7	10	7	7	7	7	6	6	6	6	6	6	6	6
Tai'an Tiankuang	10	9	11	12	12	11	11	8	10	8	9	9	9	9	10	11	9	8	8	8	8	7
Shanghai Port B	2	1	3	4	6	3	3	5	3	4	5	5	5	6	7	7	7	7	7	7	7	8
Shanxi Chongde Ronghai	9	11	10	10	10	7	8	9	8	9	10	10	10	8	9	9	8	9	9	9	10	9
Lanzhou Longyuan Athletic	8	8	7	7	7	9	10	11	11	11	12	11	11	11	8	8	10	10	10	10	9	10
Beijing IT	11	12	12	9	9	12	12	12	12	12	11	12	12	12	12	12	12	12	12	12	12	11
Hubei Istar	12	10	8	11	11	8	9	10	9	7	8	8	8	10	11	10	11	11	11	11	11	12

Qualification for Promotion stage
Qualification for Relegation stage

Source: Soccerway

=== Results by match played ===
Team ╲ Round	1	2	3	4	5	6	7	8	9	10	11	12	13	14	15	16	17	18	19	20	21	22
Beijing IT	L	L	L	W	D	L	L	L	L	L	W	L	L	L	W	L	L	D	L	W	L	W
Changchun Xidu	W	W	W	L	D	W	W	D	W	L	L	W	W	W	D	W	L	D	D	D	D	D
Hangzhou Linping Wuyue	D	D	W	D	W	L	L	L	D	L	W	L	W	W	W	W	D	W	L	D	D	D
Hubei Istar	L	D	D	L	D	W	L	L	W	W	L	L	L	L	L	D	D	D	L	L	D	L
Jiangxi Lushan	D	D	W	W	D	L	W	W	L	L	L	W	L	W	D	W	W	W	W	L	D	L
Lanzhou Longyuan Athletic	D	D	L	W	D	L	L	L	L	D	L	W	D	D	W	L	L	D	L	W	W	L
Nantong Haimen Codion	D	D	L	W	D	L	W	W	W	W	W	D	D	W	W	D	D	L	W	W	D	L
Shandong Taishan B	D	D	W	D	W	L	W	W	L	D	W	D	W	D	D	W	W	D	W	L	D	W
Shanghai Port B	W	W	L	L	L	W	W	D	W	D	L	D	D	L	L	L	D	D	D	W	L	L
Shanxi Chongde Ronghai	D	L	D	D	D	W	L	L	W	D	L	L	D	W	L	L	W	L	D	L	D	W
Tai'an Tiankuang	L	D	L	L	L	W	L	W	D	W	W	D	L	L	L	L	W	L	D	D	W	W
Wuxi Wugo	W	D	W	D	D	W	W	W	L	W	W	W	W	L	D	W	L	W	W	D	D	W

Source: Soccerway
W = Win; D = Draw; L = Loss

== South Group ==
=== League table ===
Pos	Team	Pld	W	D	L	GF	GA	GD	Pts	Qualification
1	Guangxi Hengchen	22	18	3	1	47	9	+38	57	Qualification for Promotion stage
2	Shenzhen 2028	22	14	6	2	30	13	+17	48	Qualification for Promotion stage
3	Chengdu Rongcheng B	22	12	4	6	39	20	+19	40	Qualification for Promotion stage
4	Guizhou Zhucheng Athletic	22	12	3	7	33	25	+8	39	Qualification for Promotion stage
5	Guangzhou Dandelion Alpha	22	11	5	6	31	18	+13	38	Qualification for Relegation stage
6	Wuhan Three Towns B	22	8	5	9	21	20	+1	29	Qualification for Relegation stage
7	Wenzhou	22	6	8	8	21	27	−6	26	Qualification for Relegation stage
8	Ganzhou Ruishi	22	4	11	7	18	28	−10	23	Qualification for Relegation stage
9	Guangdong Mingtu	22	4	8	10	20	32	−12	20	Qualification for Relegation stage
10	Kunming City	22	4	7	11	15	31	−16	19	Qualification for Relegation stage
11	Quanzhou Yassin	22	3	6	13	13	30	−17	15	Qualification for Relegation stage
12	Guangxi Lanhang	22	0	6	16	10	45	−35	6	Qualification for Relegation stage

Source: Soccerway
Rules for classification:
- During season: 1) Points; 2) Head-to-head points; 3) Head-to-head goal difference; 4) Head-to-head goals scored; 5) Goal difference; 6) Goals scored; 7) Rankings in the previous season. (Rules 2 to 4 are only applied when teams concerned have finished both/all the matches against others.)
- After season: 1) Points; 2) Head-to-head points; 3) Head-to-head goal difference; 4) Head-to-head goals scored; 5) Goal difference; 6) Goals scored; 7) Disciplinary points (yellow card = 1 point, red card = 3 points); 8) Drawing of lots.

=== Results ===
Home \ Away	CDR	GZR	GDM	GXH	GXL	GDA	GZA	KMC	QZY	SHZ	WZH	WTT
Chengdu Rongcheng B	—	1–1	2–0	1–3	5–0	2–1	1–2	2–0	2–0	0–2	3–0	0–0
Ganzhou Ruishi	1–1	—	2–2	0–2	1–0	0–0	2–0	2–1	1–1	1–1	2–2	1–0
Guangdong Mingtu	1–3	2–0	—	0–2	1–1	1–3	3–2	1–1	2–1	0–1	1–2	2–3
Guangxi Hengchen	1–0	2–0	1–0	—	2–1	1–0	0–2	7–0	2–0	2–2	3–0	1–1
Guangxi Lanhang	0–4	2–2	1–2	0–5	—	0–3	0–1	0–2	0–1	0–2	0–0	0–4
Guangzhou Dandelion Alpha	2–1	1–0	3–0	1–3	1–1	—	4–2	1–2	3–0	2–0	0–0	1–0
Guizhou Zhucheng Athletic	1–1	5–0	2–0	1–2	2–1	2–1	—	0–0	1–0	0–1	1–0	2–1
Kunming City	0–1	1–1	0–0	0–3	0–0	1–1	1–2	—	1–0	0–1	1–0	1–2
Quanzhou Yassin	1–4	0–0	0–0	0–2	1–0	0–1	2–2	2–1	—	0–1	0–0	0–1
Shenzhen 2028	4–1	0–0	1–1	0–0	2–0	1–1	2–1	2–0	2–1	—	0–1	2–1
Wenzhou	0–3	2–1	1–1	0–1	2–2	0–1	3–0	2–2	3–2	1–2	—	1–1
Wuhan Three Towns B	0–1	2–0	0–0	0–2	2–1	1–0	0–2	1–0	1–1	0–1	0–1	—

Source: Soccerway
Legend: Blue = home team win; Yellow = draw; Red = away team win.
For upcoming matches, an "a" indicates there is an article about the rivalry between the two participants.

=== Positions by round ===
To preserve chronological evolvements, any postponed matches are not included to the round at which they were originally scheduled, but added to the full round they were played immediately afterwards. For example, if a match is scheduled for round 7, but then played between rounds 8 and 9, it will be added to the standings for round 8.

Team ╲ Round	1	2	3	4	5	6	7	8	9	10	11	12	13	14	15	16	17	18	19	20	21	22
Guangxi Hengchen	3	11	6	5	6	4	3	2	1	1	1	1	1	1	1	1	1	1	1	1	1	1
Shenzhen 2028	2	5	9	8	8	8	6	5	4	3	2	2	2	2	2	3	3	2	2	2	2	2
Chengdu Rongcheng B	1	1	2	4	5	3	2	1	3	2	3	4	3	3	4	4	4	4	3	3	3	3
Guizhou Zhucheng Athletic	10	2	1	1	3	6	5	4	2	4	4	3	4	5	3	2	2	3	4	4	4	4
Guangzhou Dandelion Alpha	11	4	3	2	1	1	4	6	5	5	5	5	5	4	5	5	5	5	5	5	5	5
Wuhan Three Towns B	4	8	8	9	9	9	9	9	8	7	7	7	7	7	7	6	6	6	6	6	6	6
Wenzhou	5	6	4	3	2	2	1	3	6	6	6	6	6	6	6	7	7	7	7	7	7	7
Ganzhou Ruishi	6	3	5	7	7	5	7	8	9	9	9	9	9	9	8	8	8	8	8	8	8	8
Guangdong Mingtu	12	12	12	12	11	11	11	11	10	10	10	10	10	10	10	10	10	10	10	10	10	9
Kunming City	8	7	7	6	4	7	8	7	7	8	8	8	8	8	9	9	9	9	9	9	9	10
Quanzhou Yassin	9	9	10	10	10	10	10	10	11	11	11	11	11	11	11	11	11	11	11	11	11	11
Guangxi Lanhang	7	10	11	11	12	12	12	12	12	12	12	12	12	12	12	12	12	12	12	12	12	12

Qualification for Promotion stage
Qualification for Relegation stage

Source: Soccerway

=== Results by match played ===
Team ╲ Round	1	2	3	4	5	6	7	8	9	10	11	12	13	14	15	16	17	18	19	20	21	22
Chengdu Rongcheng B	W	W	D	L	D	W	W	W	L	W	L	L	W	W	L	D	W	W	W	D	W	L
Ganzhou Ruishi	D	W	D	D	D	W	L	L	L	L	D	D	D	W	D	D	L	D	L	D	W	L
Guangdong Mingtu	L	L	L	L	D	D	L	D	W	D	D	D	L	W	L	W	L	L	L	D	D	W
Guangxi Hengchen	D	L	W	W	D	W	W	W	W	W	W	W	W	W	W	D	W	W	W	W	W	W
Guangxi Lanhang	D	L	L	L	L	L	L	L	L	L	D	D	D	D	L	D	L	L	L	L	L	L
Guangzhou Dandelion Alpha	L	W	W	W	W	D	L	L	W	L	D	W	D	D	W	L	W	W	D	W	L	W
Guizhou Zhucheng Athletic	D	W	W	W	L	L	W	W	W	L	W	W	L	L	W	W	W	L	D	D	L	W
Kunming City	D	D	D	W	W	L	L	W	L	D	L	L	W	L	L	D	L	L	D	L	D	L
Quanzhou Yassin	D	D	L	L	D	L	L	L	L	W	D	D	L	L	W	L	L	L	D	L	W	L
Shenzhen 2028	W	L	L	D	D	W	W	W	W	W	W	D	D	W	D	D	W	W	W	W	W	W
Wenzhou	D	D	W	W	W	D	W	D	L	L	D	D	L	L	D	L	L	D	W	L	L	W
Wuhan Three Towns B	D	D	D	L	L	D	W	L	W	W	L	L	W	L	D	W	W	W	L	W	L	L

Source: Soccerway
W = Win; D = Draw; L = Loss

== Promotion stage ==
=== League table ===
Pos	Team	Pld	W	D	L	GF	GA	GD	Pts	Promotion
1	Guangxi Hengchen (C, P)	30	23	4	3	62	17	+45	73	Promotion to League One
2	Wuxi Wugo (P)	30	19	7	4	42	18	+24	64	Promotion to League One
3	Shenzhen 2028	30	16	7	7	36	26	+10	55	
4	Chengdu Rongcheng B	30	14	9	7	48	27	+21	51	
5	Guizhou Zhucheng Athletic	30	15	5	10	39	34	+5	50	
6	Nantong Haimen Codion	30	13	10	7	52	34	+18	49	
7	Shandong Taishan B	30	12	12	6	43	27	+16	48	
8	Changchun Xidu	30	10	11	9	24	28	−4	41	

Source: Soccerway
Rules for classification:
- During season: 1) Points; 2) Head-to-head points; 3) Head-to-head goal difference; 4) Head-to-head goals scored; 5) Goal difference; 6) Goals scored; 7) Rankings in the previous season. (Rules 2 to 4 are only applied when teams concerned have finished both/all the matches against others.)
- After season: 1) Points; 2) Head-to-head points; 3) Head-to-head goal difference; 4) Head-to-head goals scored; 5) Goal difference; 6) Goals scored; 7) Disciplinary points (yellow card = 1 point, red card = 3 points); 8) Drawing of lots.
  (C) Champions; (P) Promoted

=== Results ===
Home \ Away	CCX	CDR	GXH	GZA	NHC	SDT	SHZ	WXW
Changchun Xidu		1–1	0–3	1–2			0–3	
Chengdu Rongcheng B	4–2				2–1	0–0		0–0
Guangxi Hengchen	4–1				2–1	1–0		1–2
Guizhou Zhucheng Athletic	0–0				1–1	1–0		0–2
Nantong Haimen Codion		0–0	3–4	4–0			2–0	
Shandong Taishan B		1–1	0–0	0–2			5–0	
Shenzhen 2028	0–0				1–2	0–1		2–1
Wuxi Wugo		2–1	1–0	1–0			2–0	

Source: Soccerway
Legend: Blue = home team win; Yellow = draw; Red = away team win.
For upcoming matches, an "a" indicates there is an article about the rivalry between the two participants.

=== Positions by round ===
To preserve chronological evolvements, any postponed matches are not included to the round at which they were originally scheduled, but added to the full round they were played immediately afterwards. For example, if a match is scheduled for round 7, but then played between rounds 8 and 9, it will be added to the standings for round 8.

Team ╲ Round	23	24	25	26	27	28	29	30
Guangxi Hengchen	1	1	1	1	1	1	1	1
Wuxi Wugo	3	2	2	2	2	2	2	2
Shenzhen 2028	2	3	3	3	3	3	3	3
Chengdu Rongcheng B	4	4	5	5	4	4	5	4
Guizhou Zhucheng Athletic	7	5	4	4	5	5	4	5
Nantong Haimen Codion	8	8	6	7	7	7	6	6
Shandong Taishan B	5	6	7	6	6	6	7	7
Changchun Xidu	6	7	8	8	8	8	8	8

Leader and promotion to League One
Promotion to League One

Source: Soccerway

=== Results by match played ===
Team ╲ Round	23	24	25	26	27	28	29	30
Changchun Xidu	D	L	L	D	L	D	L	L
Chengdu Rongcheng B	D	W	D	D	D	D	L	W
Guangxi Hengchen	W	W	W	L	W	D	W	L
Guizhou Zhucheng Athletic	L	W	W	D	L	D	W	L
Nantong Haimen Codion	L	L	W	D	L	D	W	W
Shandong Taishan B	D	L	L	W	D	D	L	W
Shenzhen 2028	D	L	L	L	W	W	L	L
Wuxi Wugo	W	W	D	W	W	L	W	W

Source: Soccerway
W = Win; D = Draw; L = Loss

== Relegation stage ==
=== Group A ===
==== League table ====
Pos	Team	Pld	W	D	L	GF	GA	GD	Pts	Relegation
1	Hangzhou Linping Wuyue	30	13	8	9	34	33	+1	47	
2	Guangzhou Dandelion Alpha	30	13	7	10	37	27	+10	46	
3	Lanzhou Longyuan Athletic	30	10	10	10	32	33	−1	40	
4	Shanghai Port B	30	9	10	11	32	32	0	37	
5	Wenzhou	30	9	10	11	28	33	−5	37	
6	Guangdong Mingtu	30	7	8	15	26	42	−16	29	
7	Hubei Istar	30	6	9	15	31	48	−17	27	
8	Quanzhou Yassin (R)	30	3	10	17	17	41	−24	19	Relegation to CMCL

Source: Soccerway
Rules for classification:
- During season: 1) Points; 2) Head-to-head points; 3) Head-to-head goal difference; 4) Head-to-head goals scored; 5) Goal difference; 6) Goals scored; 7) Rankings in the previous season. (Rules 2 to 4 are only applied when teams concerned have finished both/all the matches against others.)
- After season: 1) Points; 2) Head-to-head points; 3) Head-to-head goal difference; 4) Head-to-head goals scored; 5) Goal difference; 6) Goals scored; 7) Disciplinary points (yellow card = 1 point, red card = 3 points); 8) Drawing of lots.
  (R) Relegated

==== Results ====
Home \ Away	GDM	GDA	HLW	HBI	LLA	QZY	SHP	WZH
Guangdong Mingtu			1–0	0–1	1–2		1–0	
Guangzhou Dandelion Alpha			1–0	1–3	0–0		0–1	
Hangzhou Linping Wuyue	2–0	2–0				2–1		1–0
Hubei Istar	2–1	0–2				0–0		0–1
Lanzhou Longyuan Athletic	3–0	1–0				0–0		1–0
Quanzhou Yassin			2–3	1–1	0–4		0–1	
Shanghai Port B	0–2	2–2				0–0		1–1
Wenzhou			2–0	3–1	0–0		0–2	

Source: Soccerway
Legend: Blue = home team win; Yellow = draw; Red = away team win.
For upcoming matches, an "a" indicates there is an article about the rivalry between the two participants.

==== Positions by round ====
To preserve chronological evolvements, any postponed matches are not included to the round at which they were originally scheduled, but added to the full round they were played immediately afterwards. For example, if a match is scheduled for round 7, but then played between rounds 8 and 9, it will be added to the standings for round 8.

Team ╲ Round	23	24	25	26	27	28	29	30
Hangzhou Linping Wuyue	2	2	2	1	2	1	1	1
Guangzhou Dandelion Alpha	1	1	1	2	1	2	2	2
Lanzhou Longyuan Athletic	5	5	5	5	5	4	3	3
Shanghai Port B	3	3	4	3	3	3	4	4
Wenzhou	4	4	3	4	4	5	5	5
Guangdong Mingtu	6	6	6	6	6	6	6	6
Hubei Istar	7	7	7	7	7	7	7	7
Quanzhou Yassin	8	8	8	8	8	8	8	8

Relegation to CMCL

Source: Soccerway

==== Results by match played ====
Team ╲ Round	23	24	25	26	27	28	29	30
Guangdong Mingtu	L	W	W	L	L	L	W	L
Guangzhou Dandelion Alpha	L	D	D	L	W	L	L	W
Hangzhou Linping Wuyue	W	L	W	W	L	W	W	L
Hubei Istar	W	D	L	W	L	D	L	W
Lanzhou Longyuan Athletic	W	D	D	D	W	W	W	W
Quanzhou Yassin	L	D	L	D	D	D	L	L
Shanghai Port B	W	D	L	W	D	W	L	D
Wenzhou	L	D	W	L	W	L	W	D

Source: Soccerway
W = Win; D = Draw; L = Loss

=== Group B ===
==== League table ====
Pos	Team	Pld	W	D	L	GF	GA	GD	Pts	Relegation
1	Jiangxi Lushan	30	14	7	9	39	29	+10	49	
2	Tai'an Tiankuang	30	11	8	11	31	30	+1	41	
3	Wuhan Three Towns B	30	10	8	12	28	27	+1	38	
4	Beijing IT	30	11	2	17	39	36	+3	35	
5	Shanxi Chongde Ronghai	30	8	11	11	28	41	−13	35	
6	Ganzhou Ruishi	30	7	12	11	24	37	−13	33	
7	Kunming City (R)	30	6	9	15	24	41	−17	27	Relegation to CMCL
8	Guangxi Lanhang (R)	30	0	8	22	16	71	−55	8	Relegation to CMCL

Source: Soccerway
Rules for classification:
- During season: 1) Points; 2) Head-to-head points; 3) Head-to-head goal difference; 4) Head-to-head goals scored; 5) Goal difference; 6) Goals scored; 7) Rankings in the previous season. (Rules 2 to 4 are only applied when teams concerned have finished both/all the matches against others.)
- After season: 1) Points; 2) Head-to-head points; 3) Head-to-head goal difference; 4) Head-to-head goals scored; 5) Goal difference; 6) Goals scored; 7) Disciplinary points (yellow card = 1 point, red card = 3 points); 8) Drawing of lots.
  (R) Relegated

==== Results ====
Home \ Away	BIT	GZR	GXL	JXL	KMC	SCR	TAT	WTT
Beijing IT		3–0	5–0		3–2			1–0
Ganzhou Ruishi	1–0			0–1		2–0	1–2	
Guangxi Lanhang	0–3			1–5		1–1	0–2	
Jiangxi Lushan		1–2	5–1		1–0			0–0
Kunming City	2–3			2–0		0–0	1–0	
Shanxi Chongde Ronghai		2–0	4–2		2–2			0–1
Tai'an Tiankuang		0–0	1–1		1–0			2–1
Wuhan Three Towns B	2–0			1–1		1–2	1–1	

Source: Soccerway
Legend: Blue = home team win; Yellow = draw; Red = away team win.
For upcoming matches, an "a" indicates there is an article about the rivalry between the two participants.

==== Positions by round ====
To preserve chronological evolvements, any postponed matches are not included to the round at which they were originally scheduled, but added to the full round they were played immediately afterwards. For example, if a match is scheduled for round 7, but then played between rounds 8 and 9, it will be added to the standings for round 8.

Team ╲ Round	23	24	25	26	27	28	29	30
Jiangxi Lushan	1	1	1	1	1	1	1	1
Tai'an Tiankuang	3	3	3	3	3	3	2	2
Wuhan Three Towns B	2	2	2	2	2	2	3	3
Beijing IT	7	5	6	6	5	5	5	4
Shanxi Chongde Ronghai	4	4	4	4	6	6	6	5
Ganzhou Ruishi	5	6	5	5	4	4	4	6
Kunming City	6	7	7	7	7	7	7	7
Guangxi Lanhang	8	8	8	8	8	8	8	8

Relegation to CMCL

Source: Soccerway

==== Results by match played ====
Team ╲ Round	23	24	25	26	27	28	29	30
Beijing IT	W	W	L	W	W	L	W	W
Ganzhou Ruishi	L	L	W	D	W	W	L	L
Guangxi Lanhang	L	D	L	D	L	L	L	L
Jiangxi Lushan	W	W	W	D	L	L	W	D
Kunming City	L	D	W	L	W	D	L	L
Shanxi Chongde Ronghai	W	D	L	D	L	D	W	W
Tai'an Tiankuang	D	D	L	D	W	W	W	W
Wuhan Three Towns B	D	L	W	D	L	W	L	D

Source: Soccerway
W = Win; D = Draw; L = Loss

== Awards ==
=== Player of the Round ===
Player of the Round
Round	Player	Club	Ref.
1	(China) Wang Haobin	Shandong Taishan B	
2	(China) Rehmitulla Shohret	Wenzhou	
3	(China) Qeyser Tursun	Wuxi Wugo	
4	(China) Yang Youxian	Guangzhou Dandelion Alpha	
5	(China) Kuai Jiwen (China) Yin Jiaxi	Shanghai Port B Shandong Taishan B	
6	(China) Gong Zheng	Shanxi Chongde Ronghai	
7	(China) Chen Long	Wuhan Three Towns B	
8	(China) Qeyser Tursun (2)	Wuxi Wugo	
9	(China) Li Deming	Shanghai Port B	
10	(China) Gu Jiayi	Chengdu Rongcheng B	
11	(China) Fei Ernanduo	Guangxi Hengchen	
12	(China) Yan Ge	Nantong Haimen Codion	
13	(China) Peng Xiao	Shandong Taishan B	
14	(China) Gong Zheng (2)	Shanxi Chongde Ronghai	
15	(China) Chen Zitong	Lanzhou Longyuan Athletic	
16	(China) Wang Haobin (2)	Shandong Taishan B	
17	(China) Peng Xiao (2)	Shandong Taishan B	
18	(China) Fan Bingwei (China) Wang Ziyang	Guangzhou Dandelion Alpha; Shenzhen 2028	
19	(China) Tong Le	Wuxi Wugo	
20	(China) Ular Muhtar	Lanzhou Longyuan Athletic	
21	(China) Li Moyu	Chengdu Rongcheng B	
22	(China) Wang Ziyang (2)	Shenzhen 2028	
23	(China)		
24	(China) Xu Chunqing	Wuxi Wugo	
25	(China)		
26	(China)		
27	(China)		
28	(China)		
29	(China)		
30	(China)		

=== Monthly awards ===
Month	Player of the Month		Manager of the Month		Young Player of the Month	
Month	Player	Club	Manager	Club	Player	Club
March/April	(China) Yang Youxian	Guangzhou Dandelion Alpha	(China) Li Bin	Changchun Xidu	(China) Chen Yuhao	Guangzhou Dandelion Alpha
May	(China) Chen Long	Wuhan Three Towns B	(China) Gao Wanguo	Nantong Haimen Codion	(China) Chen Yuhao	Guangzhou Dandelion Alpha
June	(China) Peng Xiao	Shandong Taishan B	(China) Xu Lei	Hangzhou Linping Wuyue	(China) Peng Xiao	Shandong Taishan B
July	(China) Fei Ernanduo	Guangxi Hengchen	(China) Liu Junwei	Guangxi Hengchen	(China) Wang Ziyang	Shenzhen 2028

== League attendance ==
Pos	Team	Total	High	Low	Average	Change
1	Guizhou Zhucheng Athletic	153,180	31,569	2,331	12,765	n/a^{††}
2	Lanzhou Longyuan Athletic	120,606	15,872	2,080	10,051	+502.9%^{††††}
3	Shandong Taishan B	116,098	11,613	7,874	9,675	+147.9%
4	Nantong Haimen Codion	49,004	7,513	513	4,084	+36.9%
5	Chengdu Rongcheng B	31,419	4,827	924	2,618	n/a^{†††}
6	Jiangxi Lushan	29,327	5,285	852	2,444	−4.3%^{†}
7	Guangxi Lanhang	26,580	13,566	55	2,416	−66.0%
8	Guangxi Hengchen	24,659	16,117	506	2,055	+261.8%
9	Wenzhou	22,039	2,732	1,068	1,837	+1,813.5%^{†††††}
10	Hangzhou Linping Wuyue	20,849	3,782	541	1,737	+60.2%^{††††††}
11	Shanxi Chongde Ronghai	19,496	1,936	1,166	1,625	+4.5%^{†††††††}
12	Changchun Xidu	18,135	4,967	243	1,511	n/a^{††}
13	Ganzhou Ruishi	14,448	5,269	268	1,204	+80.5%
14	Wuxi Wugo	10,364	1,268	247	864	−47.8%^{†}
15	Tai'an Tiankuang	9,705	1,578	423	809	−34.8%
16	Guangzhou Dandelion Alpha	5,745	623	304	479	n/a^{††}
17	Beijing IT	5,520	489	289	425	+9.5%
18	Wuhan Three Towns B	4,979	816	151	415	n/a^{†††}
19	Shenzhen 2028	4,350	522	186	363	n/a^{††}
20	Quanzhou Yassin	4,097	503	178	341	−25.7%
21	Hubei Istar	3,936	613	87	328	+17.1%
22	Guangdong Mingtu	3,598	685	131	300	n/a^{††}
23	Shanghai Port B	2,971	408	158	248	+7.4%
24	Kunming City	750	131	0	63	−50.4%
	League total	701,855	31,569	0	2,437	+6.0%

Updated to games played on 31 August 2025
Notes:
^{†} Teams played previous season in CL1.
^{††} Teams played previous season in CMCL.
^{†††} Teams played previous season in U-21.
^{††††} Team relocated from Rizhao, Shandong to Lanzhou, Gansu.
^{†††††} Team relocated from Wuyuan, Jiangxi to Wenzhou, Zhejiang.
^{††††††} Team relocated from Langfang, Hebei to Hangzhou, Zhejiang.
^{†††††††} Team relocated from Yan'an, Shaanxi to Taiyuan, Shanxi.
