= Joan Esteva =

Spanish football manager

Personal information
- Full name: Joan Esteva Pomares
- Date of birth: 28 April 1973 (age 53)
- Place of birth: Barcelona, Spain
- Position: Midfielder

Team information
- Current team: Manila Digger (head coach)

Youth career
- PB Anguera
- 1987–1990: Europa
- 1991–1992: Espanyol

Senior career*
Years	Team	Apps	(Gls)
1992	Cerdanyola Mataró		
1992	Sant Andreu		
1992–1994	L'Hospitalet	34	(3)
- Alella
- Sant Cugat

Managerial career
- Alella
- 2006–2008: Sant Cugat
- 2008–2011: Sporting Mahonés
- 2012–2014: Constància
- 2014: Castellón
- 2015: Ferreries
- 2015–2016: Sant Andreu
- 2016–2018: Europa
- 2018–2019: Figueres
- 2019–2022: Resources Capital
- 2022: United City (director of football/caretaker)
- 2022–2023: Resources Capital
- 2024–2025: FE Grama
- 2025: Foshan Nanshi
- 2025–2026: Wenzhou FC
- 2026–: Manila Digger
- * Club domestic league appearances and goals

Joan Esteva Pomares (born 28 April 1973) is a Spanish professional football manager and former player who is the head coach of Philippines Football League club Manila Digger.

== Club career ==
Born in Barcelona, Catalonia, Esteva played for the youth teams of PB Anguera, Europa and Espanyol, before spending two seasons with third-tier L'Hospitalet. He also played for Cerdanyola Mataró and Sant Andreu.

== Managerial career ==
Esteva became player-manager of CF Alella, before taking up a similar position at Sant Cugat. He went on to manage Sporting Mahonés, Constància and Castellón, before joining Ferreries in June 2015. After a short spell, he joined his former club Sant Andreu in October of the same year.

In August 2019, Esteva became the head coach of Hong Kong Premier League club Resources Capital. On 3 June 2022, it was announced that Esteva had left the club after 3 years.

On 19 September 2022, Esteva was appointed as the Director of Football for Philippines Football League club United City.

On 4 November 2022, Esteva returned to Resources Capital as the head coach of the club once again. On 29 May 2023, he left the club.

== Career statistics ==
=== Club ===
Appearances and goals by club, season and competition
Club	Season	League			Cup		Other		Total	
Club	Season	Division	Apps	Goals	Apps	Goals	Apps	Goals	Apps	Goals
L'Hospitalet	1992–93	Segunda División B	16	2	0	0	0	0	16	2
L'Hospitalet	1993–94	Segunda División B	18	1	0	0	0	0	18	1
Career total			34	3	0	0	0	0	34	3

== Managerial statistics ==
As of 5 January 2022

Managerial record by team and tenure
Team	From	To	Record				
Team	From	To	P	W	D	L	Win %
Sporting Mahonés	2009	2011	77	22	24	31	28.6
Constància	2012	2014	80	20	23	37	25.0
Figueres	2018	2019	27	7	9	11	25.9
Resources Capital	2019	2022	49	15	7	27	30.6
Total			233	64	63	106	27.5
