= Ruan Sai =

Chinese association football player

Personal information
- Date of birth: 15 February 2001 (age 25)
- Height: 1.73 m (5 ft 8 in)
- Position: Midfielder

Team information
- Current team: Jiangxi Dark Horse Junior
- Number: 15

Youth career
- –2020: Guangzhou Evergrande

Senior career*
Years	Team	Apps	(Gls)
2020–2023	Guangzhou FC	0	(0)
2023	Jiangxi Dark Horse Junior (loan)	13	(0)
2024-	Jiangxi Dark Horse Junior	0	(0)
- * Club domestic league appearances and goals as of 14:01, 15 January 2022 (UTC)

Ruan Sai (Chinese: 阮赛; born 15 February 2001) is a Chinese footballer currently playing as a midfielder for Wenzhou Professional F.C.

== Career statistics ==
=== Club ===
As of 15 January 2022.

Club	Season	League			Cup		Continental		Other		Total	
Club	Season	Division	Apps	Goals	Apps	Goals	Apps	Goals	Apps	Goals	Apps	Goals
Guangzhou	2020	Chinese Super League	0	0	1 (Note: Appearances in the Chinese FA Cup)	0	0	0	0	0	1	0
Guangzhou	2021	Chinese Super League	0	0	0	0	5 (Note: Appearances in the AFC Champions League)	0	0	0	5	0
Career total			0	0	1	0	5	0	0	0	6	0
