= Guangxi Hengchen F.C. =

Chinese professional football club

Guangxi Hengchen
- Full name: Guangxi Hengchen Football club 广西恒宸足球俱乐部
- Founded: 18 March 2021; 5 years ago
- Ground: Nanning Sports School Wuhe Campus Stadium
- Manager: Liu Junwei
- League: China League One
- 2025: China League Two, 1st of 24 (promoted)
Home colours	Away colours

Guangxi Hengchen Football Club (simplified Chinese: 广西恒宸足球俱乐部; traditional Chinese: 廣西恆宸足球俱樂部; pinyin: Guǎngxī Héngchén Zúqiú Jùlèbù) is a Chinese professional football club based in Nanning, Guangxi, that competes in China League One, the second tier of Chinese football. Guangxi Hengchen plays its home matches at the Nanning Sports School Wuhe Campus Stadium, located within Qingxiu District.

== History ==
Founded in March 2021, Guangxi Hengchen participated in the regional 2022 Guangxi Champions League. On 18 April 2022, Guangxi Hengchen finished second place only behind Guangxi Lanhang, and were promoted to the 2022 CMCL, the fourth tier of Chinese football. In the 2022 CMCL, the club was drawn against Yuxi Yukun and Chongqing Rich in group B. Guangxi Hengchen finished top of their group to qualify for a two-legged group stage play-off tie. On 28 June 2022, they were knocked out 3–2 on aggregate by Hunan HBS Mangguoba.

In 2023, Guangxi Hengchen were qualified to play for the CMCL once again, this time as champions of the 2022 Guangxi Super League, a different competition to that of the Guangxi Champions League, and was drawn into group N. After four wins and a draw, Guangxi Hengchen went through to the final round of the CMCL. They were slotted into group B, alongside the likes of Binzhou Huilong and Langfang Glory City. After all seven matches of the group, Hengchen were 5th of the group, and advanced through to the promotion play-offs.

In the promotion play-offs, Hengchen were forced into two penalty shoot-outs, and the club had to beat both Xi'an Chongde Ronghai 4–3 in the semi-final on 21 October and 5–4 against Rizhao Yuqi in the decider on 28 October 2023, to earn promotion to China League Two for the first time in the club's history.

On 14 September 2025, in their second ever season in China League Two, Guangxi Hengchen secured promotion to China League One after winning 4–1 against Changchun Xidu.

== Current squad ==
=== First-team squad ===
As of July 2026

Note: Flags indicate national team as defined under FIFA eligibility rules; some limited exceptions apply. Players may hold more than one non-FIFA nationality.

No.	Pos.	Nation	Player
1	GK	CHN	Dai Jiatong
2	DF	CHN	Lü Jiaqiang
3	DF	CHN	Yuan Xiucheng
4	DF	CHN	Zhang Zhaozhi
5	DF	CHN	Luan Haodong
6	DF	CHN	Chen Guanjian
7	MF	CHN	Chen Dongtao
10	MF	GEO	Rati Ardazishvili
11	FW	MAD	Loïc Lapoussin
12	FW	TPE	Yu Yao-hsing
14	FW	CHN	Chen Baoxuan
16	FW	CHN	Ning Weichen
18	FW	CHN	Wei Chaolun

No.	Pos.	Nation	Player
19	FW	CHN	Cen Liyi
20	MF	CHN	Lu Junhui
21	MF	CHN	Dai Ming
23	MF	CHN	Lobsang Khedrup
24	MF	CHN	Ji Xinlong
25	MF	CHN	Ren Kangkang
27	DF	CHN	Zhang Zijian
28	DF	CHN	Subi Ablimit
32	DF	CHN	Li Siqi
36	FW	COD	Noel Mbo
39	GK	CHN	Zhang Jianzhi (on loan from Beijing Guoan)
41	GK	CHN	Liang Kun
42	MF	CHN	Ji Tianle
44	MF	CHN	Liang Yibin

== Managerial staff ==
Position	Staff
Head coach	(China) Liu Junwei
Assistant coach	(China) Wang Cun
Assistant coach	(China) Wang Lin
Goalkeeping Coach	(China) Cheng Xiaopeng

== Managerial history ==
(China) Wang Jun (February 2022 – 6 June 2024)
(China) Sun Weirong (June 2024 – December 2024)
(China) Liu Junwei (January 2025 – Present)

== Honours ==
League

- CMCL
  - Play-off winners: 2023
- CL2
  - Champion: 2025
