= Li Siqi (footballer) =

Chinese footballer

Personal information
- Date of birth: 30 August 1997 (age 29)
- Place of birth: Beijing, China
- Height: 1.83 m (6 ft 0 in)
- Positions: Midfielder; defender

Team information
- Current team: Guangxi Hengchen
- Number: 32

Youth career
- 2014–2018: Beijing Guoan

Senior career*
| Years | Team | Apps | (Gls) |
| 2018–2019 | Beijing Guoan | 0 | (0) |
| 2019–2020 | Smederevo | 1 | (0) |
| 2020 | Inđija | 0 | (0) |
| 2020–2021 | Hebei Aoli Jingying | 4 | (0) |
| 2021 | → Yanbian Longding (loan) | 12 | (5) |
| 2022 | Yanbian Longding | 7 | (0) |
| 2022 | Wuxi Wugo | 5 | (0) |
| 2023 | Shanghai Jiading Huilong | 11 | (0) |
| 2023–2024 | Langfang Glory City | 28 | (3) |
| 2025– | Guangxi Hengchen | 27 | (0) |
- * Club domestic league appearances and goals as of 13:51, 5 May 2022 (UTC)

Li Siqi (Chinese: 李思琦; pinyin: Lǐ Sīqí; born 30 August 1997) is a Chinese footballer currently playing as a midfielder or defender for Guangxi Hengchen.

== Club career ==
Li Siqi would play for the Beijing Guoan youth team before being promoted to the senior team within the 2018 Chinese Super League season. The following season he would go abroad to join Serbian second tier football club Smederevo where he would make his professional debut on 9 November 2019 in a league game against Bačka in a 1-0 defeat.

== Career statistics ==
As of 31 December 2020.

Appearances and goals by club, season and competition
| Club | Season | League | | | National Cup | | Continental | | Other | | Total | |
| Club | Season | Division | Apps | Goals | Apps | Goals | Apps | Goals | Apps | Goals | Apps | Goals |
|---|---|---|---|---|---|---|---|---|---|---|---|---|
| Beijing Guoan | 2018 | Chinese Super League | 0 | 0 | 0 | 0 | – | | – | | 0 | 0 |
| Smederevo | 2019–20 | Serbian First League | 1 | 0 | 0 | 0 | – | | – | | 1 | 0 |
| Inđija | 2019–20 | Serbian SuperLiga | 0 | 0 | 0 | 0 | – | | – | | 0 | 0 |
| Hebei Aoli Jingying | 2020 | China League Two | 4 | 0 | – | | – | | – | | 4 | 0 |
| Career total | | | 5 | 0 | 0 | 0 | 0 | 0 | 0 | 0 | 5 | 0 |

== Honours ==
=== Club ===
Beijing Guoan

- Chinese FA Cup: 2018
