= Yan'an National Fitness Center =

Sports complex in Yan'an, Shaanxi, China

- Interactive map of Yan'an National Fitness Center
- Location: Yan'an, Shaanxi, China
- Coordinates: 36.629°N 109.487°E
- Owner: Yan'an Municipal Government
- Capacity: 30,105
- Surface: Grass

Construction
- Opened: 2020

Tenant
- Yan'an Ronghai F.C.

Yan'an National Fitness Center (Chinese: 延安市全民健身中心) is a multi-purpose sports complex located in Yan'an, Shaanxi, China. It serves as a venue for sports, cultural events, and community activities. The center is notable for its unique architectural design, which incorporates elements of traditional Loess Plateau cave dwellings, blending modern functionality with local cultural heritage.

== History ==
The Yan'an National Fitness Center was completed in 2020 and officially opened in September 2021, coinciding with the 14th China National Games, where it hosted international wrestling events. The project was part of a broader initiative to enhance Yan'an's sports infrastructure and promote regional development. The center's design and construction were led by the China Architecture Design Institute, with Shanxi Jujiang Art Concrete providing the GRC cladding that gives the complex its distinctive yellow rammed earth texture, reminiscent of the Loess Plateau's cave dwellings.

== Design and architecture ==
The center's architecture is a fusion of modern engineering and traditional cultural elements. Key features include:

- GRC Cladding: The use of glass fiber reinforced concrete (GRC) with a yellow rammed earth texture connects the building to the local landscape and architectural heritage.
- Cave Dwelling Inspiration: The design reflects the traditional living style of the Loess Plateau, with structures resembling cave dwellings, a hallmark of Northern Shaanxi culture.

== Facilities ==
The Yan'an National Fitness Center offers a range of facilities, including:

- Main Stadium: A 30,105-seat venue primarily used for football matches and athletics events.
- Training Facilities: Spaces for athletes and community members to practice and train.
- Cultural Spaces: Areas designed to host concerts, festivals, and other cultural events, leveraging the center's open-air acoustics and large capacity.

== Events ==
The center has hosted several significant events, including:

- 14th China National Games (2021): The center was a key venue for wrestling events during this national multi-sport competition.
- The stadium serves as the home ground for Yan'an Ronghai F.C., a team competing in China League Two.
