= Liu Junwei =

Chinese footballer and manager

Liu Junwei 刘俊威
Personal information
- Full name: Liu Junwei
- Date of birth: 1 May 1976 (age 50)
- Place of birth: Shenyang, Liaoning, China
- Height: 1.80 m (5 ft 11 in)
- Position: Defender

Team information
- Current team: Guangxi Hengchen (head coach)

Youth career
- Bayi

Senior career*
Years	Team	Apps	(Gls)
1997–2003	Bayi	98	(4)
2004–2008	Qingdao Jonoon	92	(5)
2008	→ Nanchang Bayi (loan)	21	(1)
2009–2010	Nanchang Bayi	21	(0)

Managerial career
- 2011–2015: Shanghai Shenxin (assistant)
- 2015: Shanghai Shenxin
- 2015–2016: Wuhan Zall (assistant)
- 2017–2018: China U-16 (caretaker)
- 2019–2020: Suzhou Dongwu
- 2023–2024: Langfang Glory City
- 2025–: Guangxi Hengchen
- * Club domestic league appearances and goals

Liu Junwei (Chinese: 刘俊威; born 1 May 1976 in Shenyang) is a Chinese football manager and former football player.

== Playing career ==
Liu Junwei began his professional football career in 1997 when he was promoted to Bayi Football Team's first team squad. He moved to Chinese Super League side Qingdao Jonoon after Bayi dissolved in 2004. In February 2008, he was loaned to China League One side Nanchang Bayi for one season with the fee of ¥300,000. He was named as the club's captain in the 2008 league season. He transferred to Nanchang Bayi on 25 February 2009. He announced his retirement at the end of 2010 league season.

== Management career ==
Liu became the assistant and fitness coach of Nanchang Bayi after his retirement. He followed the club to move to Shanghai and changed their name as Shanghai Shenxin in 2012. On 13 April 2015, Liu was appointed as the new manager of Shanghai Shenxin after Guo Guangqi resigned. He left the club at the end of the season after Shanghai Shenxin finished the last of the league and Relegated to China League One. In December 2015, Liu joined League One side Wuhan Zall and became their assistant coach. He left Wuhan in June 2016 after Ciro Ferrara became the manager of the club. Liu was appointed as the manager of China League Two club Suzhou Dongwu in February 2019. He left the club in 2020.

== Personal life ==
Liu married former China women's national basketball team captain Bai Hua (Chinese: 柏华) on 25 July 2004.

== Career statistics ==
As of 11 January 2023.

Appearances and goals by club, season and competition
Club	Season	League			National Cup		Other		Total	
Club	Season	Division	Apps	Goals	Apps	Goals	Apps	Goals	Apps	Goals
Bayi	1997	Chinese Jia-A League	11	0	?	?	-		11	0
Bayi	1998	Chinese Jia-A League	20	0	?	?	-		20	0
Bayi	1999	Chinese Jia-B League	?	?	?	?	-		0	0
Bayi	2000	Chinese Jia-B League	?	?	?	?	-		0	0
Bayi	2001	Chinese Jia-A League	22	2	?	?	-		22	2
Bayi	2002	Chinese Jia-A League	23	1	?	?	-		23	1
Bayi	2003	Chinese Jia-A League	22	1	?	?	-		22	1
Bayi	Total		98	4	0	0	0	0	98	4
Qingdao Jonoon	2004	Chinese Super League	17	0	?	?	-		17	0
Qingdao Jonoon	2005	Chinese Super League	25	3	?	?	-		25	3
Qingdao Jonoon	2006	Chinese Super League	26	2	?	?	-		26	2
Qingdao Jonoon	2007	Chinese Super League	24	0	-		-		24	0
Qingdao Jonoon	Total		92	5	0	0	0	0	92	5
Nanchang Bayi (loan)	2008	China League One	21	1	-		-		21	1
Nanchang Bayi	2009	China League One	20	0	-		-		20	0
Nanchang Bayi	2010	Chinese Super League	1	0	-		-		1	0
Nanchang Bayi	Total		21	0	0	0	0	0	21	0
Career total			232	10	0	0	0	0	232	10
