= Tai'an Tiankuang F.C. =

Chinese football club

Tai'an Tiankuang 泰安天贶
- Full name: Tai'an Tiankuang Football Club 泰安天贶足球俱乐部
- Founded: 10 October 2010; 15 years ago
- Ground: Tai'an Sports Center Stadium
- Capacity: 32,000
- Manager: Qu Wenbo
- League: China League Two
- 2025: China League Two, 12th of 24
Home colours	Away colours

Tai'an Tiankuang Football Club (Chinese: 泰安天贶足球俱乐部; pinyin: Tài'ān Tiānkuàng Zúqiú Jùlèbù) is a Chinese professional football club Tai'an, Shandong, that competes in China League Two, the third tier of Chinese football. Tai'an Tiankuang plays its home matches at the Taishan Stadium, located within Daiyue District.

== History ==
Tai'an Huawei F.C. was founded in 2010. The club participated in Chinese Champions League in 2021 and was promoted to China League Two. In 2022, the club changed its name to Tai'an Tiankuang F.C.

== Name history ==
- 2010–2021 Tai'an Huawei F.C. 泰安华伟
- 2022– Tai'an Tiankuang F.C. 泰安天贶

== Crest history ==
Tai'an Tiankuang logo used in 2021
