= Wenzhou Professional F.C. =

Chinese football club

Wenzhou FC 温州 FC
- Full name: Wenzhou Professional Football Club 温州职业足球俱乐部
- Founded: November 2018; 7 years ago
- Ground: Wenzhou Sports Centre
- Capacity: 18,000
- Owner: Shenzhen Tibang Sports Culture Ltd.
- Chairman: Wang Chao
- Manager: Joan Esteva
- League: China League Two
- 2025: China League Two, 17th of 24
Home colours	Away colours

Wenzhou Professional Football Club (Chinese: 温州职业足球俱乐部; pinyin: Wēnzhōu Zhíyè Zúqiú Jùlèbù), commonly known as Wenzhou FC, is a Chinese professional football club based in Wenzhou, Zhejiang, that competes in China League Two, the third tier of Chinese football.

== History ==
Yichun Jiangxi Tungsten V Tiger F.C. was founded in November 2018, and was renamed as Yichun Jiangxi Tungsten Grand Tiger F.C. before participating in Chinese Champions League in 2020 and gaining promotion to China League Two, after beating Hebei Jingying Zhihai in the semi-finals. In 2021, the club changed its name to Yichun Grand Tiger F.C. In 2022, the club changed its name to Jiangxi Dark Horse Junior F.C.

== Name history ==
- 2018–2019 Yichun Jiangxi Tungsten V Tiger F.C. 宜春江钨V虎
- 2020 Yichun Jiangxi Tungsten Grand Tiger F.C. 宜春江钨威虎
- 2021 Yichun Grand Tiger F.C. 宜春威虎
- 2022–2024 Jiangxi Dark Horse Junior F.C. 江西黑马青年
- 2025– Wenzhou Professional F.C. 温州 FC

== Players ==
=== Current squad ===
As of 9 March 2025

Note: Flags indicate national team as defined under FIFA eligibility rules; some limited exceptions apply. Players may hold more than one non-FIFA nationality.

No.	Pos.	Nation	Player
3	DF	CHN	Liu Ruicheng
5	DF	CHN	Li Xuepeng
6	DF	CHN	Mustapa Tash (on loan from Shandong Taishan)
7	MF	CHN	Muzapar Muhta (on loan from Shenzhen Peng City)
8	DF	CHN	Han Tianlin
9	MF	CHN	Tian Jiarui
10	FW	CHN	Ruan Sai
11	MF	CHN	Lü Shihao
13	DF	CHN	Ibrahim Kurban
16	MF	CHN	Zhang Hongjiang
17	FW	CHN	Rehmitulla Shohret
18	FW	CHN	Liu Jiabin
19	FW	CHN	Geng Taili
20	MF	CHN	Wang Bojun

No.	Pos.	Nation	Player
21	DF	CHN	Liu Jing
22	DF	CHN	Wang Guanqiao (on loan from Qingdao Red Lions)
28	MF	CHN	Zhu Chunyou
29	FW	CHN	Dong Xu
33	MF	CHN	Wang Jiaqi
37	GK	CHN	Mewlan Jappar
42	DF	CHN	Zhao Xiaolong (on loan from Changchun Yatai)
45	MF	CHN	Jin Yunchao
47	DF	CHN	Liu Fanyi (on loan from Shandong Taishan)
51	GK	CHN	Wei Kaile
52	GK	CHN	He Xiang
53	FW	CHN	Sun Weikai
56	FW	CHN	Zhang Zhijie
58	DF	CHN	Wang Qihong (on loan from Liaoning Tierenc)

== Managerial staff ==
Position	Staff
Head Coach	(Spain) Joan Esteva
Assistant Coach	(China) Zhao Ming
Assistant Coach	(China) Liu Yusheng
Goalkeeping Coach	(China) Sun Qibin
Club Manager	(China) Jiang Chen
