= Hangzhou Linping Wuyue F.C. =

Association football club in China

Hangzhou Linping Wuyue
- Full name: Hangzhou Linping Wuyue Football Club 杭州临平吴越足球俱乐部
- Founded: 20 December 2022; 2 years ago
- Ground: Linping Sports Centre Stadium
- Capacity: 10,200
- Manager: Xu Lei
- League: China League Two
- 2025: China League Two, 10th of 24
Home colours	Away colours

Hangzhou Linping Wuyue Football Club (Chinese: 杭州临平吴越足球俱乐部; pinyin: Hángzhōu Línpíng Wúyuè Zúqiú Jùlèbù) is a Chinese professional football club based in Hangzhou, Zhejiang, that competes in China League Two, the third tier of Chinese football. Hangzhou Linping Wuyue plays its home matches at the Linping Sports Centre Stadium, located within Linping District.

== History ==
=== Langfang Glory City ===
Logo of Langfang Glory City between 2022 and 2024

Langfang Glory City was founded in December 2022, on the brink of dissolution for the Hebei first-team, also based in Langfang. As champions of the 2022 Hebei Football League, Langfang Glory City were promoted to the CMCL for the 2023 season. After Hebei's dissolution, a number of their former youth academy players joined Langfang Glory City.

Led by manager Liu Junwei, a former Hebei caretaker manager, Langfang Glory City were drawn into the groups E and F division of the 2023 CMCL. On 12 July, after 5 matches in played at centralised venues in Changzhi, the team finished first place, guiding Langfang into the final round.

Langfang were drawn into group B of the final round alongside the likes of Binzhou Huilong, Guangxi Hengchen, and Guangzhou E-Power. On 8 October, after a 1–0 win over Guangxi Hengchen on home soil, Langfang Glory City gained promotion to the 2024 China League Two with a gameweek to spare by securing first place in the group stage. In the two-legged finals play-offs, Langfang faced up against Shenzhen Juniors, first place in group A. In the first leg, Langfang picked up a 1–1 home draw on 29 October 2023, through a late Shenzhen Juniors equaliser. In the second leg away on 3 November, 1–1 was once again the scoreline after 90 minutes making it 2–2 on aggregate, meaning the game would go to a penalty shoot-out. Langfang won 4–2 on spot-kicks, and they would step up into 2024 China League Two as invincible champions in the 2023 season.

=== Hangzhou Linping Wuyue ===
On 20 February 2025, Langfang Glory City completed its relocation to Hangzhou, Zhejiang, and renamed themselves as Hangzhou Linping Wuyue Football Club.

== Players ==
=== First-team squad ===
As of 19 March 2024

Note: Flags indicate national team as defined under FIFA eligibility rules; some limited exceptions apply. Players may hold more than one non-FIFA nationality.

No.	Pos.	Nation	Player
2	DF	CHN	Yang Chenyu (captain)
3	DF	CHN	Luan Haodong
5	DF	CHN	Li Shisen
6	MF	CHN	Chen Yanpu
7	MF	CHN	Tan Fucheng
8	MF	CHN	An Shuo
9	FW	CHN	Yang Xudong
10	FW	CHN	Wu Yufan
11	MF	CHN	Gao Bohan
12	GK	CHN	Chen Nancun
17	DF	CHN	Li Hao
18	FW	CHN	Wei Chaolun
21	MF	CHN	Xie Longfei
26	DF	CHN	Gou Junchen

No.	Pos.	Nation	Player
30	MF	CHN	Zhang Haoyu
32	DF	CHN	Li Siqi
44	GK	CHN	Liang Jinfan
46	MF	CHN	Sun Zhonghao
47	MF	CHN	Chen Jiacheng
51	MF	CHN	Lu Jianchen
53	DF	CHN	Meng Xuanyi
55	MF	CHN	Zhou Han
56	DF	CHN	Meng Xuanrui
57	DF	CHN	Zhang Silin
58	MF	CHN	Ji Xinlong
59	MF	CHN	Ji Tianle
60	GK	CHN	Ding Boda

== Coaching staff ==
Position	Staff
Manager	(China) Xu Lei
Assistant coaches	(China) Gu Zhongqing (China) Lu Yongguang

== Honours ==
League

- CMCL
  - Champions: 2023
