= 2023 China League One =

China League One
- Season: 2023
- Dates: 22 April – 5 November
- Champions: Sichuan Jiuniu
- Promoted: Sichuan Jiuniu; Qingdao West Coast
- Matches: 240
- Goals: 543 (2.26 per match)
- Top goalscorer: Moses Ogbu (20 goals)
- Biggest home win: Nanjing City 5–0 Wuxi Wugo (13 May 2023)
- Biggest away win: Shanghai Jiading Huilong 1–5 Suzhou Dongwu (20 May 2023)
- Highest scoring: Heilongjiang Ice City 6–2 Wuxi Wugo (9 July 2023)
- Longest winning run: Sichuan Jiuniu (9 matches)
- Longest unbeaten run: Qingdao West Coast (12 matches)
- Longest winless run: Wuxi Wugo (22 matches)
- Longest losing run: Wuxi Wugo (8 matches)
- Highest attendance: 20,924; Yanbian Longding 1–1 Heilongjiang Ice City (18 June 2023)
- Lowest attendance: 207; Dandong Tengyue 0–0 Nanjing City (10 October 2023)
- Total attendance: 1,330,979
- Average attendance: 5,546

The 2023 Chinese Football Association League 1 (Chinese: 2023中国足球协会甲级联赛) was the 20th season of China League One, the second tier of the Chinese football league pyramid, since its establishment in 2004.

== Clubs ==
=== Club changes ===
==== To League One ====
Teams relegated from 2022 Chinese Super League

- Guangzhou

Teams promoted from 2022 China League Two

- Jinan Xingzhou
- Dandong Tengyue
- Yanbian Longding
- Dongguan United
- Wuxi Wugo

==== From League One ====
Teams promoted to 2023 Chinese Super League

- Qingdao Hainiu
- Nantong Zhiyun

Teams relegated to 2023 China League Two

- Beijing IT

Dissolved entries

- ~~Wuhan Yangtze River~~
- ~~Hebei~~
- ~~Kunshan~~
- ~~Shaanxi Chang'an Athletic~~
- ~~Zibo Cuju~~
- ~~Beijing BSU~~
- ~~Xinjiang Tianshan Leopard~~

==== Name changes ====
- Wuxi Wugou F.C. changed their name to Wuxi Wugo in March 2023.
- Qingdao Youth Island F.C. changed their name to Qingdao West Coast in March 2023.
- Jiangxi Beidamen F.C. changed their name to Jiangxi Lushan in March 2023.

=== Clubs information ===
Team	Head Coach	City	Stadium	Capacity	2022 season
Guangzhou ^{R}	(Spain) Salvador Suay Sánchez	Guangzhou	Yuexiushan Stadium	18,000	CSL, 17th
Shijiazhuang Gongfu	(China) Zhou Lin	Shijiazhuang	Yutong International Sports Center	38,000	4th
Suzhou Dongwu	(China) Lu Bofei	Suzhou	Suzhou Olympic Sports Centre	40,933	6th
Suzhou Dongwu	(China) Lu Bofei	Suzhou	Kunshan Sports Centre Stadium (Kunshan)	30,000	6th
Sichuan Jiuniu	(Spain) Jesús Tato (caretaker)	Chengdu	Shuangliu Sports Centre	26,000	7th
Sichuan Jiuniu	(Spain) Jesús Tato (caretaker)	Chengdu	East Town Sports Park Stadium	1,000	7th
Sichuan Jiuniu	(Spain) Jesús Tato (caretaker)	Chengdu	Suining Sports Center (Suining)	30,000	7th
Nanjing City	(China) Cao Rui	Nanjing	Nanjing Youth Olympic Sports Park	18,000	8th
Qingdao West Coast	(Bulgaria) Zoran Janković (caretaker)	Qingdao	Guzhenkou University City Sports Center	20,000	9th
Heilongjiang Ice City	(China) Jia Shunhao	Harbin	Harbin ICE Sports Center	48,000	10th
Guangxi Pingguo Haliao	(China) Jiang Chen	Pingguo	Pingguo Stadium	15,990	11th
Liaoning Shenyang Urban	(China) Duan Xin	Shenyang	Shenyang Urban Construction University Stadium	12,000	12th
Shanghai Jiading Huilong	(China) Yang Lin	Shanghai	Jiading Stadium	9,704	13th
Jiangxi Lushan	(China) Yu Ming	Ruichang	Ruichang Sports Park Stadium	13,188	14th
Jinan Xingzhou ^{P}	(Serbia) Dejan Antonić	Jinan	Shandong Provincial Stadium	43,700	CL2, 1st
Jinan Xingzhou ^{P}	(Serbia) Dejan Antonić	Jinan	Zaozhuang Sports and Cultural Centre Stadium (Zaozhuang)	31,284	CL2, 1st
Dandong Tengyue ^{P}	(China) Wang Dan	Dandong	Huludao Sports Centre Stadium (Huludao)	38,798	CL2, 2nd
Yanbian Longding ^{P}	(South Korea) Kim Bong-gil	Longjing	Yanji Stadium (Yanji)	30,000	CL2, 3rd
Dongguan United ^{P}	(China) Wang Hongwei	Dongguan	Dongguan Stadium	22,191	CL2, 4th
Dongguan United ^{P}	(China) Wang Hongwei	Dongguan	Nanhai Sports Center (Foshan)	20,000	CL2, 4th
Wuxi Wugo ^{P}	(China) Li Yinan	Wuxi	Wuxi Sports Center	28,000	CL2, 5th
Wuxi Wugo ^{P}	(China) Li Yinan	Wuxi	Jiangyin Stadium	30,161	CL2, 5th

=== Clubs locations ===
Location of teams in 2023 China League One
2023 China League One teams in Jiangsu and Shanghai

=== Managerial changes ===
Team	Outgoing manager	Manner of departure	Date of vacancy	Position in table	Incoming manager	Date of appointment
Nanjing City	(Spain) Óscar Céspedes	Sacked	23 May 2023	6th	(China) Cao Rui	23 May 2023
Wuxi Wugo	(China) Yang Lin	Sacked	23 May 2023	15th	(China) Wei Xin	23 May 2023
Shanghai Jiading Huilong	(China) Li Yinan	Sacked	23 May 2023	13th	(China) Yang Lin	12 June 2023
Guangzhou	(China) Liu Zhiyu	Sacked	6 June 2023	14th	(Spain) Salvador Suay Sánchez	6 June 2023
Qingdao West Coast	(China) Zhou Xin	Sacked	21 June 2023	2nd	(Bulgaria) Zoran Janković	22 June 2023
Shijiazhuang Gongfu	(China) Zhang Hui	Sacked	26 June 2023	9th	(China) Zhou Lin	26 June 2023
Wuxi Wugo	(China) Wei Xin	Sacked	26 June 2023	16th	(China) Li Yinan	27 June 2023
Jinan Xingzhou	(China) Tang Jing	Sacked	9 July 2023	7th	(China) Wei Xin	10 July 2023
Liaoning Shenyang Urban	(China) Duan Xin	Sacked	25 July 2023	13th	(China) Gao Mingqi	25 July 2023
Jiangxi Lushan	(Brazil) Bene Lima	Sacked	23 August 2023	15th	(China) Yu Ming	23 August 2023
Suzhou Dongwu	(China) Lu Bofei	Sacked	28 August 2023	10th	(China) Niu Hongli	1 September 2023
Jinan Xingzhou	(China) Wei Xin	Sacked	3 September 2023	8th	(Serbia) Dejan Antonić	12 September 2023

== Foreign players ==
- Players name in **bold** indicates the player is registered during the mid-season transfer window.

Team	Player 1	Player 2	Player 3	Hong Kong/Macau/ Taiwan Players^{1}	Naturalized Players	Former Players
Dandong Tengyue	**(Ivory Coast) Kobena Amed**	(Lesotho) Thabiso Brown	(Serbia) Mladen Kovačević	(Hong Kong) Remi Dujardin		(South Korea) Noh Dae-seung
Dongguan United	(Cameroon) Raoul Loé	(Nigeria) Kingsley Onuegbu		**(Chinese Taipei) Chen Hao-wei**	(United States) → (China) Sun Delin^{2}	
Guangxi Pingguo Haliao	(Brazil) Fabrício	**(Cameroon) Donovan Ewolo**	(Spain) David Mateos	(Hong Kong) Matt Orr		(Serbia) Uroš Đerić
Guangzhou						
Heilongjiang Ice City	(Brazil) Erikys	**(Georgia (country)) Elguja Lobjanidze**	(Serbia) Nemanja Vidić	**(Hong Kong) Clement Benhaddouche**		(Brazil) Romário
Jiangxi Lushan	(Brazil) Magno Cruz	(Brazil) Weslley	**(Senegal) Laurent Mendy**			
Jinan Xingzhou	**(Brazil) Fernando Karanga**	(Cameroon) Robert Ndip Tambe	(Zambia) Stoppila Sunzu			(Nigeria) Moses Odo
Liaoning Shenyang Urban	**(Colombia) Boris Palacios**	(Nigeria) Sabir Musa	(Nigeria) Michael Omoh	**(Chinese Taipei) Wu Yen-shu**		(Nigeria) Chris Shimbayev
Nanjing City	**(Burkina Faso) Abdou Razack Traoré**	(Cameroon) Messi Bouli	(Kenya) Ayub Masika	(Chinese Taipei) Yaki Yen		(Brazil) Jefferson
Qingdao West Coast	(Brazil) Raniel	(Brazil) **Wesley Tanque**	(Colombia) Juan Pablo Ramírez	(Chinese Taipei) Chen Po-liang		(Colombia) Orlando Berrío
Shanghai Jiading Huilong	**(Brazil) Jefferson**	(Ghana) Evans Etti	(Ghana) Jacob Mensah	**(Hong Kong) Alex Tayo Akande**	(South Korea) → (China) Xu Hui^{2}	(Ghana) Fredrick Asante
Shijiazhuang Gongfu	(Brazil) Venício	(Ecuador) José Ayoví	(Nigeria) Moses Ogbu			
Sichuan Jiuniu	**(Nigeria) Chisom Egbuchulam**	(Spain) Edu García	(Spain) Jorge Ortiz		(Japan) → (China) Xia Dalong^{2}	(Brazil) Júnior Negrão
Suzhou Dongwu					(Portugal) → (China) **Pedro Delgado**	
Wuxi Wugo	**(Serbia) Miloš Gordić**	**(Serbia) Bogdan Mladenović**				
Yanbian Longding	**(Brazil) Mychell Chagas**	(Brazil) Ivo	(Guinea-Bissau) Valdu Té			(Cameroon) Pange Lobe

- **^1** For Hong Kong, Macau, or Taiwanese players, if they are non-naturalized and were registered as professional footballers in Hong Kong's, Macau's, or Chinese Taipei's football association for the first time, they are recognized as native players. Otherwise they are recognized as foreign players.
- **^2** Naturalized players whose parents or grandparents were born in mainland China, thus are regarded as local players.

== League table ==
Pos	Team	Pld	W	D	L	GF	GA	GD	Pts	Promotion, qualification or relegation
1	Sichuan Jiuniu (C, P)	30	22	3	5	51	19	+32	69	Promotion to Super League
2	Qingdao West Coast (P)	30	17	10	3	44	22	+22	61	Promotion to Super League
3	Shijiazhuang Gongfu	30	16	8	6	43	23	+20	56	
4	Guangxi Pingguo Haliao	30	14	12	4	38	20	+18	54	
5	Nanjing City	30	12	13	5	34	22	+12	49	
6	Jinan Xingzhou	30	11	10	9	34	31	+3	43	Dissolved
7	Dongguan United	30	11	8	11	31	34	−3	41	
8	Yanbian Longding	30	8	12	10	31	32	−1	36	
9	Heilongjiang Ice City	30	9	8	13	42	40	+2	35	
10	Liaoning Shenyang Urban	30	8	11	11	30	42	−12	35	
11	Shanghai Jiading Huilong	30	7	10	13	20	37	−17	31	
12	Guangzhou	30	8	6	16	31	43	−12	30	
13	Dandong Tengyue	30	6	12	12	28	38	−10	30	Dissolved
14	Suzhou Dongwu	30	6	10	14	28	41	−13	28	
15	Wuxi Wugo	30	6	7	17	29	54	−25	25	
16	Jiangxi Lushan	30	6	6	18	29	45	−16	24	

Source: Soccerway
Rules for classification:
- During season: 1) Points; 2) Goal difference; 3) Goals scored.
- After season: 1) Points; 2) Head-to-head points; 3) Head-to-head goal difference; 4) Head-to-head goals scored; 5) Scores of the weight ratio of the reserve league and youth leagues.
  (C) Champions; (P) Promoted

== Results ==
Home \ Away	DDT	DGU	GPH	GZH	HLJ	JXL	JNX	LSU	NJC	QWC	SJH	SJZ	SCJ	SZD	WXW	YBL
Dandong Tengyue	—	1–1	1–1	1–4	2–1	1–1	1–1	2–0	0–0	2–2	1–1	1–2	1–2	1–1	3–1	1–1
Dongguan United	0–0	—	2–1	1–2	2–2	1–0	2–0	4–0	1–1	1–1	1–0	1–0	0–3	0–0	1–0	1–1
Guangxi Pingguo Haliao	2–0	2–0	—	1–0	2–0	2–1	3–0	4–0	0–0	0–0	3–0	1–0	0–3	0–0	1–1	2–1
Guangzhou	0–1	1–0	1–2	—	3–2	2–1	1–1	0–0	1–1	0–2	0–0	0–3	1–1	0–1	1–2	2–0
Heilongjiang Ice City	3–2	1–0	1–1	1–0	—	1–2	2–2	0–1	3–0	1–1	1–0	2–3	1–2	3–0	6–2	1–1
Jiangxi Lushan	1–0	1–2	0–2	2–3	2–2	—	2–2	3–1	1–2	0–1	1–2	0–2	0–1	2–3	2–3	0–2
Jinan Xingzhou	0–1	3–4	0–0	2–1	0–0	1–0	—	2–2	1–2	3–0	2–0	1–0	0–2	0–0	1–2	2–0
Liaoning Shenyang Urban	2–0	3–0	0–0	3–1	0–3	3–1	1–1	—	3–0	0–2	1–1	1–1	0–2	1–1	1–0	2–0
Nanjing City	1–0	2–1	0–0	3–2	2–0	0–0	0–1	4–0	—	1–0	1–1	1–1	0–1	2–1	5–0	1–0
Qingdao West Coast	0–0	2–0	2–0	4–2	3–1	1–0	1–1	3–1	1–1	—	2–0	1–2	1–0	2–0	3–1	1–0
Shanghai Jiading Huilong	1–0	1–1	2–0	1–0	1–0	1–2	0–1	1–1	0–0	0–1	—	1–1	1–3	1–5	2–1	1–0
Shijiazhuang Gongfu	2–1	1–0	0–0	2–0	1–0	1–1	1–2	1–1	0–2	1–1	2–0	—	0–1	3–0	4–0	3–2
Sichuan Jiuniu	2–3	2–1	1–1	2–0	2–0	2–0	2–1	1–0	0–0	2–3	2–0	0–2	—	2–1	4–0	3–1
Suzhou Dongwu	2–1	1–2	1–3	1–2	0–2	0–1	0–1	1–1	1–1	0–0	1–1	0–1	0–2	—	3–0	1–0
Wuxi Wugo	3–0	0–1	1–2	1–1	2–1	0–1	0–2	1–1	1–1	0–1	0–0	1–2	0–1	4–1	—	0–0
Yanbian Longding	0–0	2–0	2–2	1–0	1–1	1–1	1–0	2–0	1–0	2–2	3–0	1–1	1–0	2–2	2–2	—

Source: Soccerway
Legend: Blue = home team win; Yellow = draw; Red = away team win.
For upcoming matches, an "a" indicates there is an article about the rivalry between the two participants.

== Positions by round ==
To preserve chronological evolvements, any postponed matches are not included to the round at which they were originally scheduled, but added to the full round they were played immediately afterwards. For example, if a match is scheduled for round 7, but then played between rounds 8 and 9, it will be added to the standings for round 8.

Team ╲ Round	1	2	3	4	5	6	7	8	9	10	11	12	13	14	15	16	17	18	19	20	21	22	23	24	25	26	27	28	29	30
Sichuan Jiuniu	5	4	1	4	3	5	3	3	4	5	5	3	2	2	2	4	3	3	1	1	2	2	1	1	1	1	1	1	1	1
Qingdao West Coast	4	6	3	1	1	1	2	2	2	2	2	4	5	4	5	3	2	2	3	2	1	1	2	2	2	2	2	2	2	2
Shijiazhuang Gongfu	12	16	15	10	7	8	5	9	10	9	7	6	4	3	3	2	4	4	2	4	5	3	4	4	4	4	3	3	3	3
Guangxi Pingguo Haliao	1	1	4	2	2	2	1	1	1	1	1	1	1	1	1	1	1	1	4	3	3	4	5	5	5	5	5	5	4	4
Nanjing City	2	2	6	7	4	6	4	6	3	3	4	2	3	5	4	5	5	5	5	5	4	5	3	3	3	3	4	4	5	5
Jinan Xingzhou	16	7	8	9	12	10	8	8	7	4	3	5	7	6	6	7	6	6	6	7	6	6	6	6	6	6	6	6	6	6
Dongguan United	3	3	7	5	8	11	11	11	11	11	13	11	12	12	11	10	10	8	8	8	7	7	7	7	7	7	7	7	7	7
Yanbian Longding	14	13	11	11	10	7	10	7	6	7	9	7	9	9	9	9	9	10	10	9	10	9	9	9	9	9	10	8	8	8
Heilongjiang Ice City	15	15	13	15	11	9	7	5	8	8	6	8	6	7	7	6	7	7	7	6	8	8	8	8	8	8	8	9	9	9
Liaoning Shenyang Urban	10	10	5	6	9	12	12	12	13	13	11	14	14	13	13	13	12	13	14	11	12	12	10	12	10	11	9	10	10	10
Shanghai Jiading Huilong	8	11	10	12	13	13	14	15	15	15	15	15	15	15	15	14	14	14	13	14	14	13	13	13	13	14	14	14	14	11
Guangzhou	9	9	12	14	14	14	15	14	14	14	12	10	10	10	12	12	13	11	11	12	11	11	12	11	12	10	11	12	12	12
Dandong Tengyue	7	8	9	8	5	4	9	10	9	10	10	12	11	11	10	11	11	12	12	13	13	14	14	14	14	13	12	11	11	13
Suzhou Dongwu	6	5	2	3	6	3	6	4	5	6	8	9	8	8	8	8	8	9	9	10	9	10	11	10	11	12	13	13	13	14
Wuxi Wugo	13	14	16	13	15	15	16	16	16	16	16	16	16	16	16	16	16	16	16	16	16	16	16	16	16	16	16	16	16	15
Jiangxi Lushan	11	12	14	16	16	16	13	13	12	12	14	13	13	14	14	15	15	15	15	15	15	15	15	15	15	15	15	15	15	16

Leader and promotion to Super League
Promotion to Super League

Source: Soccerway

== Results by match played ==
Team ╲ Round	1	2	3	4	5	6	7	8	9	10	11	12	13	14	15	16	17	18	19	20	21	22	23	24	25	26	27	28	29	30
Dandong Tengyue	D	D	D	W	W	D	L	D	D	L	L	L	W	L	W	L	D	L	L	L	D	D	D	L	D	W	W	D	L	L
Dongguan United	W	D	L	W	L	D	D	L	L	D	L	W	D	D	W	W	L	W	W	W	D	L	D	L	W	L	L	W	L	W
Guangxi Pingguo Haliao	W	D	D	W	W	W	W	W	W	D	W	L	D	D	W	D	L	W	L	W	D	D	D	D	L	D	W	D	W	W
Guangzhou	D	D	L	L	L	L	L	D	W	D	W	W	W	L	D	L	L	W	L	L	W	D	L	W	L	W	L	L	L	L
Heilongjiang Ice City	L	D	D	L	W	W	W	W	L	D	W	L	W	D	L	W	L	D	D	W	L	L	L	D	D	L	L	L	W	L
Jiangxi Lushan	L	D	L	L	L	L	W	D	W	L	L	W	L	L	L	L	W	L	L	D	D	D	L	L	D	L	L	W	W	L
Jinan Xingzhou	L	W	D	D	L	W	W	D	W	W	W	L	L	W	L	D	W	D	D	L	D	L	W	W	D	D	W	D	L	L
Liaoning Shenyang Urban	D	D	W	D	L	D	L	L	L	D	W	L	L	W	L	W	D	L	D	W	D	D	W	L	D	D	W	L	L	W
Nanjing City	W	D	D	D	W	L	W	D	W	W	D	W	D	D	W	L	W	D	W	D	W	D	W	D	D	W	L	D	L	L
Qingdao West Coast	W	D	W	W	W	W	D	D	W	L	D	D	L	W	D	W	W	W	D	W	W	W	D	W	D	L	W	D	W	W
Shanghai Jiading Huilong	D	D	D	L	L	L	L	L	L	D	L	L	D	W	D	W	W	D	W	L	D	W	L	L	D	D	W	L	L	W
Shijiazhuang Gongfu	L	L	D	W	W	D	W	L	L	W	W	W	W	W	W	W	L	W	W	L	D	W	D	D	D	D	W	D	W	W
Sichuan Jiuniu	W	D	W	L	W	L	W	W	L	D	W	W	W	D	W	L	W	W	W	W	L	W	W	W	W	W	W	W	W	W
Suzhou Dongwu	W	D	W	D	L	W	L	W	D	D	L	D	W	D	L	D	D	L	L	L	D	L	L	W	L	D	L	L	L	L
Wuxi Wugo	L	D	L	D	L	L	L	L	L	D	L	L	L	L	L	L	L	L	D	D	D	L	W	W	W	D	L	W	W	W
Yanbian Longding	L	D	D	D	W	W	L	W	W	D	L	W	L	L	D	D	D	L	D	D	L	W	D	L	D	D	L	W	W	L

Source: Soccerway
W = Win; D = Draw; L = Loss

== Goalscorers ==
As of 5 November 2023

Rank	Player	Club	Goals
1	(Nigeria) Moses Ogbu	Shijiazhuang Gongfu	20
2	(Brazil) Raniel	Qingdao West Coast	15
2	(Hong Kong) Matt Orr	Guangxi Pingguo Haliao	15
4	(Brazil) Erikys	Heilongjiang Ice City	14
5	(Cameroon) Robert Ndip Tambe	Jinan Xingzhou	13
6	(Cameroon) Messi Bouli	Nanjing City	11
6	(Spain) Jorge Ortiz	Sichuan Jiuniu	11
8	(Spain) Edu García	Sichuan Jiuniu	10
8	(China) Liu Ziming	Liaoning Shenyang Urban	10
8	(Nigeria) Kingsley Onuegbu	Dongguan United	10
11	(China) Wang Zihao	Jinan Xingzhou	9
11	(Nigeria) Chisom Egbuchulam	Sichuan Jiuniu	9
11	(Brazil) Magno Cruz	Jiangxi Lushan	9
14	(Colombia) Juan Ramirez	Qingdao West Coast	8
14	(China) Ruan Jun	Dongguan United	8

=== Hat-tricks ===
Player	For	Against	Result	Date
(China) Dong Honglin	Suzhou Dongwu	Jiangxi Lushan	3-2 (A)	8 July 2023
(Brazil) Raniel	Qingdao West Coast	Sichuan Jiuniu	3-2 (A)	2 September 2023
(Nigeria) Chisom Egbuchulam	Sichuan Jiuniu	Dongguan United	3-0 (A)	15 October 2023

== Awards ==
=== Player of the Round ===
The following players were named the Player of the Round.

Round	Player	Club	References
1	(China) Liu Baiyang	Guangxi Pingguo Haliao	
2	(China) Yi Xianlong	Jinan Xingzhou	
3	(China) Xu Chunqing	Suzhou Dongwu	
4	(Nigeria) Moses Ogbu	Shijiazhuang Gongfu	
5	(Lesotho) Thabiso Brown	Dandong Tengyue	
6	(China) Wu Lei	Suzhou Dongwu	
7	(China) Liu Baiyang	Guangxi Pingguo Haliao	
8	(China) Lü Pin	Guangxi Pingguo Haliao	
9	(Hong Kong) Matt Orr	Guangxi Pingguo Haliao	
10	(Cameroon) Robert Ndip Tambe	Jinan Xingzhou	
11	(China) Hou Yu	Guangzhou	
12	(Nigeria) Kingsley Onuegbu	Dongguan United	
13	(China) Dong Honglin	Suzhou Dongwu	
14	(Colombia) Juan Pablo Ramírez	Qingdao West Coast	
15	(Nigeria) Kingsley Onuegbu	Dongguan United	
16	(Colombia) Boris Palacios	Liaoning Shenyang Urban	
17	(Brazil) Jefferson	Shanghai Jiading Huilong	
17	(China) Zhang Xinlin	Nanjing City	
18	(Nigeria) Moses Ogbu	Shijiazhuang Gongfu	
18	(Nigeria) Kingsley Onuegbu	Dongguan United	
19	(Burkina Faso) Abdou Razack Traoré	Nanjing City	
20	(Spain) Jorge Ortiz	Sichuan Jiuniu	
21	(Brazil) Raniel	Qingdao West Coast	
22	(Ecuador) José Ayoví	Shijiazhuang Gongfu	
23	(Cameroon) Robert Ndip Tambe	Jinan Xingzhou	
24	(China) Zhang Yuanshu	Wuxi Wugo	

=== Monthly awards ===
Month	Player of the Month		Manager of the Month		Young Player of the Month	
Month	Player	Club	Manager	Club	Player	Club
April/May	(China) Liu Baiyang	Guangxi Pingguo Haliao	(China) Zhou Xin	Qingdao West Coast	(China) Liu Baiyang	Guangxi Pingguo Haliao
June	(Cameroon) Messi Bouli	Nanjing City	(China) Tang Jing	Jinan Xingzhou	(China) Yang Hao	Guangzhou
June	(Hong Kong) Matt Orr	Guangxi Pingguo Haliao	(China) Tang Jing	Jinan Xingzhou	(China) Yang Hao	Guangzhou
July	(Nigeria) Moses Ogbu	Shijiazhuang Gongfu	(China) Zhou Lin	Shijiazhuang Gongfu	(China) Ling Jie	Guangzhou
July	(Nigeria) Moses Ogbu	Shijiazhuang Gongfu	(China) Zhou Lin	Shijiazhuang Gongfu	(China) Wang Shijie	Guangzhou
August	(Nigeria) Kingsley Onuegbu	Dongguan United	(Spain) Jesús Tato	Sichuan Jiuniu	(China) Li Shibin	Yanbian Longding

== League attendance ==
As of 5 November 2023

Pos	Team	Total	High	Low	Average	Change
1	Guangxi Pingguo Haliao	227,022	15,999	12,268	15,135	n/a
2	Yanbian Longding	223,842	20,924	8,155	14,923	n/a
3	Shijiazhuang Gongfu	148,100	16,813	3,613	9,873	n/a
4	Heilongjiang Ice City	136,782	14,662	5,633	9,119	n/a
5	Guangzhou	134,226	11,829	7,315	8,948	n/a
6	Qingdao West Coast	82,718	10,166	1,066	5,515	n/a
7	Jinan Xingzhou	76,315	18,862	779	5,088	n/a
8	Jiangxi Lushan	47,809	6,728	963	3,187	n/a
9	Nanjing City	43,853	4,758	1,257	2,924	n/a
10	Sichuan Jiuniu	43,088	6,162	316	2,873	n/a
11	Liaoning Shenyang Urban	39,386	10,804	521	2,626	n/a
12	Suzhou Dongwu	38,368	4,798	1,088	2,558	n/a
13	Dandong Tengyue	32,734	9,736	207	2,182	n/a
14	Wuxi Wugo	24,224	4,198	365	1,615	n/a
15	Shanghai Jiading Huilong	17,472	2,195	325	1,165	n/a
16	Dongguan United	15,040	2,108	468	1,003	n/a
	League total	1,330,979	20,924	207	5,546	n/a

Updated to games played on 5 November 2023
