= 2022 China League One =

China League One
- Season: 2022
- Dates: 8 June – 8 December
- Champions: Qingdao Hainiu; 1st China League One title
- Promoted: Qingdao Hainiu; Nantong Zhiyun
- Relegated: Beijing BIT
- Matches: 306
- Goals: 800 (2.61 per match)
- Top goalscorer: Kingsley Onuegbu (27 goals)
- Biggest home win: Sichuan Jiuniu 5–0 Beijing BSU (26 October 2022)
- Biggest away win: Xinjiang Tianshan Leopard 1–7 Qingdao Hainiu (28 November 2022)
- Highest scoring: Shanghai Jiading Huilong 2–6 Kunshan (23 September 2022)
- Longest winning run: Kunshan (14 matches)
- Longest unbeaten run: Kunshan (30 matches)
- Longest winless run: Beijing BIT (28 matches)
- Longest losing run: Xinjiang Tianshan Leopard (15 matches)

The 2022 China League One (Chinese: 2022中国足球协会甲级联赛) was the 19th season of the China League One, the second tier of the Chinese football league pyramid, since its establishment in 2004.

== Format ==
On 12 May 2022, the Chinese Football Association announced the format of the season. The season will be divided into 4 stages (8, 8, 8 and 10 rounds respectively). In the first stage, 18 teams will be divided into three groups. The hosts will be allocated to each group and other teams will be drawn based on last season's rankings. In the second, third and fourth stage, the teams in three groups will be switched to ensure that each team can play against each other twice.

=== Groups ===
The draw for the stages took place on 12 May 2022.

Team	2021 season	Draw order	No.	Group			
Team	2021 season	Draw order	No.	First stage	Second stage	Third stage	Fourth stage
Shijiazhuang Gongfu	CL2, 2nd (Host)	—	A1	A	D	G	J
Nantong Zhiyun	5th	1	A2	A	D	G	J
Zibo Cuju	11th	6	A3	A	F	H	K
Suzhou Dongwu	13th	7	A4	A	F	H	K
Guangxi Pingguo Haliao	CL2, 3rd	12	A5	A	E	I	L
Qingdao Youth Island	CL2, 4th	13	A6	A	E	I	L
Nanjing City	10th (Host)	—	B1	B	E	H	J
Shaanxi Chang'an Athletic	6th	2	B2	B	E	H	J
Kunshan	9th	5	B3	B	D	I	K
Jiangxi Beidamen	14th	8	B4	B	D	I	K
Qingdao Hainiu	CL2, 1st	11	B5	B	F	G	L
Beijing BIT	17th	14	B6	B	F	G	L
Shanghai Jiading Huilong	CL2, 7th	—	C1	C	F	I	J
Heilongjiang Ice City	7th	3	C2	C	F	I	J
Sichuan Jiuniu	8th	4	C3	C	E	G	K
Beijing BSU	15th	9	C4	C	E	G	K
Liaoning Shenyang Urban	16th	10	C5	C	D	H	L
Xinjiang Tianshan Leopard	18th	15	C6	C	D	H	L

=== Centralised venues ===
- Tangshan (Groups A, D, G and L)
  - Tangshan Nanhu City Football Training Base Field No.1
  - Tangshan Nanhu City Football Training Base Field No.2
  - Tangshan Nanhu City Football Training Base Field No.3
- Nanjing (Groups B, E, H and J)
  - Jiangning Football Training Base Field No.2
  - Jiangning Football Training Base Stadium
- Dalian (Groups C, F, I and K)
  - Dalian Sports Centre Stadium Field No.3
  - Dalian Youth Football Training Base Main Stadium

== Clubs ==
=== Club changes ===
==== To League One ====
Teams relegated from 2021 Chinese Super League

- ~~Qingdao~~

Teams promoted from 2021 China League Two

- Qingdao Hainiu
- Hebei Kungfu
- Guangxi Pingguo Haliao
- Qingdao Youth Island
- Shanghai Jiading Huilong

==== From League One ====
Teams promoted to 2022 Chinese Super League

- Wuhan Three Towns
- Meizhou Hakka
- Zhejiang
- Chengdu Rongcheng

Dissolved entries

- ~~Guizhou~~

==== Name changes ====
- Hebei Kungfu F.C. changed their name to Shijiazhuang Gongfu in March 2022.

=== Clubs information ===
Team	Head coach	City	Stadium	Capacity	2021 season
Nantong Zhiyun	(China) Cao Rui	Rugao	Rugao Olympic Sports Center	15,000	5th
Shaanxi Chang'an Athletic	(China) Feng Feng (caretaker)	Xi'an	Shaanxi Province Stadium	43,000	6th
Heilongjiang Ice City	(China) Jia Shunhao	Harbin	Harbin ICE Sports Center	50,000	7th
Sichuan Jiuniu	(Spain) Sergio Lobera	Chengdu	Chengdu Longquanyi Football Stadium	27,000	8th
Kunshan	(Spain) Sergio Zarco Díaz	Kunshan	Kunshan Sports Centre Stadium	30,000	9th
Nanjing City	(China) Zhang Xiaofeng	Nanjing	Nanjing Youth Olympic Sports Park	18,000	10th
Zibo Cuju	(China) Huang Hongyi	Zibo	Zibo Sports Center Stadium	45,000	11th
Suzhou Dongwu	(China) Lu Bofei	Suzhou	Suzhou Olympic Sports Centre	45,000	13th
Jiangxi Beidamen	(Brazil) Bene Lima	Ruichang	Ruichang Sports Park Stadium	13,000	14th
Beijing BSU	(China) Zhang Xu	Beijing	Olympic Sports Centre	36,228	15th
Liaoning Shenyang Urban	(China) Duan Xin	Shenyang	Shenyang Urban Construction University Stadium	12,000	16th
Qingdao Hainiu ^{P}	(China) Yin Tiesheng	Qingdao	Qingdao Tiantai Stadium	20,525	CL2, 1st
Shijiazhuang Gongfu ^{P}	(China) Zhang Hui	Shijiazhuang	Yutong International Sports Center	38,000	CL2, 2nd
Guangxi Pingguo Haliao ^{P}	(China) Zhao Changhong	Pingguo	Pingguo Stadium	15,990	CL2, 3rd (Promotion play-offs winner)
Qingdao Youth Island ^{P}	(China) Zhou Xin	Qingdao	Conson Stadium	45,000	CL2, 4th (Promotion play-offs winner)
Beijing BIT	(China) Yu Fei	Beijing	BIT Eastern Athletic Field	5,000	17th
Xinjiang Tianshan Leopard	(China) Li Dong	Ürümqi	Xinjiang Sports Centre	50,000	18th
Shanghai Jiading Huilong ^{P}	(China) Li Yinan	Shanghai	Jiading Stadium	9,704	CL2, 7th

=== Managerial changes ===
Team	Outgoing manager	Manner of departure	Date of vacancy	Position in table	Incoming manager	Date of appointment
Sichuan Jiuniu	(China) Li Yi	Mutual consent	25 December 2021	Pre-season	(Spain) Sergio Lobera	19 January 2022
Shaanxi Chang'an Athletic	(China) Feng Feng (caretaker)	End of caretaker spell	20 January 2022	Pre-season	(China) Wang Baoshan	20 January 2022
Nanjing City	(Italy) Fulvio Pea	Mutual consent	7 March 2022	Pre-season	(China) Zhang Xiaofeng	14 March 2022
Liaoning Shenyang Urban	(China) Yu Ming	Mutual consent	1 May 2022	Pre-season	(China) Zhao Faqing	1 May 2022
Heilongjiang Ice City	(China) Duan Xin	Mutual consent	7 May 2022	Pre-season	(China) Zang Haili	7 May 2022
Jiangxi Beidamen	(China) Huang Yong	Mutual consent	23 May 2022	Pre-season	(Brazil) Bene Lima	23 May 2022
Suzhou Dongwu	(England) Gary White	Mutual consent	17 July 2022	15th	(China) Lu Bofei	17 July 2022
Guangxi Pingguo Haliao	(China) Yang Lin	Mutual consent	18 July 2022	13th	(Spain) Óscar Céspedes	18 July 2022
Shaanxi Chang'an Athletic	(China) Wang Baoshan	Mutual consent	18 July 2022	7th	(China) Feng Feng (caretaker)	18 July 2022
Xinjiang Tianshan Leopard	(China) Parhat Azimat	Mutual consent	26 July 2022	12th	(China) Naser Tursun (caretaker)	26 July 2022
Liaoning Shenyang Urban	(China) Zhao Faqing	Mutual consent	27 July 2022	17th	(China) Duan Xin	27 July 2022
Shanghai Jiading Huilong	(China) Wang Hongliang	Mutual consent	11 August 2022	15th	(China) Zhang Feihu (caretaker)	11 August 2022
Xinjiang Tianshan Leopard	(China) Naser Tursun (caretaker)	End of caretaker spell	15 August 2022	16th	(China) Ashar Sheryazdon (caretaker)	15 August 2022
Guangxi Pingguo Haliao	(Spain) Óscar Céspedes	Mutual consent	3 September 2022	14th	(China) Jiang Chen (caretaker)	3 September 2022
Xinjiang Tianshan Leopard	(China) Ashar Sheryazdon (caretaker)	End of caretaker spell	7 September 2022	17th	(China) Li Bin	7 September 2022
Guangxi Pingguo Haliao	(China) Jiang Chen (caretaker)	End of caretaker spell	21 September 2022	14th	(China) Zhao Changhong	21 September 2022
Heilongjiang Ice City	(China) Zang Haili	Mutual consent	14 October 2022	11th	(China) Jia Shunhao	14 October 2022

== Foreign players ==
- Players name in **bold** indicates the player is registered during the mid-season transfer window.

Team	Player 1	Player 2	Player 3	Hong Kong/Macau/ Taiwan Players^{1}	Naturalized Players	Former Players
Beijing BIT						
Beijing BSU						
Guangxi Pingguo Haliao	(Serbia) Mladen Kovačević	(Spain) David Mateos	(Brazil) **Fabrício**	(Hong Kong) **Matt Orr**		(Hong Kong) Sandro
Heilongjiang Ice City	(Nigeria) Dominic Vinicius	(Cameroon) Franck Ohandza	(Ghana) Evans Etti			
Jiangxi Beidamen	(Brazil) Magno Cruz	(Brazil) Gileard	(Brazil) Weslley			
Kunshan	(Cape Verde) Hildeberto Pereira	(Serbia) Nemanja Čović			(Portugal) → (China) **Pedro Delgado**	
Liaoning Shenyang Urban	(Serbia) **Željko Dimitrov**	(Serbia) Uroš Tomović	(South Korea) **Ku Kyo-cheol**			
Nanjing City	(Cameroon) Messi Bouli	(Nigeria) **Sabir Musa**	(Serbia) Nemanja Vidić			(Nigeria) Chris Shimbayev
Nantong Zhiyun	(Burkina Faso) Abdou Razack Traoré	(Guinea-Bissau) Zé Turbo	(Mauritania) **Oumar Camara**	(Hong Kong) Li Ngai Hoi	(Spain) → (China) David Wang (Switzerland) → (China) Ming-yang Yang	
Qingdao Hainiu	(Burkina Faso) Adama Guira	(Mali) Ibrahim Kane	(Nigeria) Kingsley Onuegbu	(Chinese Taipei) **Wang Chien-ming**		
Qingdao Youth Island	(Brazil) Jaílton Paraíba	(Cameroon) Hervaine Moukam	(Guinea-Bissau) Valdu Té	(Chinese Taipei) Chen Po-liang		
Shaanxi Chang'an Athletic	(Cameroon) Raoul Loé	(Cameroon) Robert Ndip Tambe	(Nigeria) **Moses Ogbu**			(Romania) Ronaldo Deaconu (Chinese Taipei) Wang Chien-ming
Shanghai Jiading Huilong	(Brazil) **Alex**	(Brazil) **Sillas**	(Brazil) **Paulão**			
Shijiazhuang Gongfu	(Brazil) **Alexsandro Ferreira**	(Brazil) **João Leonardo**	(Brazil) **Venício**			(Australia) Daniel Wong
Sichuan Jiuniu	(Spain) Edu García	(Spain) Jorge Ortiz	(Spain) Hernán Santana	(Hong Kong) Andy Russell	(Japan) → (China) Xia Dalong	
Suzhou Dongwu						
Xinjiang Tianshan Leopard	(Cameroon) **Franck Kouamejo**	(Serbia) **Branko Jovanović**				
Zibo Cuju						

- **^1** For Hong Kong, Macau, or Taiwanese players, if they are non-naturalized and were registered as professional footballers in Hong Kong's, Macau's, or Chinese Taipei's football association for the first time, they are recognized as native players. Otherwise they are recognized as foreign players.

== League table ==
Pos	Team	Pld	W	D	L	GF	GA	GD	Pts	Promotion, qualification or relegation
1	Kunshan (C, D)	34	28	5	1	80	19	+61	89	Dissolved
2	Qingdao Hainiu (P)	34	23	7	4	77	24	+53	76	Promotion to Super League
3	Nantong Zhiyun (P)	34	21	7	6	62	22	+40	70	Promotion to Super League
4	Shijiazhuang Gongfu	34	20	6	8	50	31	+19	66	
5	Shaanxi Chang'an Athletic (Note: Shaanxi Chang'an Athletic had 6 points deducted due to unpaid salaries on 23 November 2022.) (D)	34	18	8	8	55	32	+23	56	Dissolved
6	Suzhou Dongwu	34	16	7	11	42	33	+9	55	
7	Sichuan Jiuniu (Note: Sichuan Jiuniu had 6 points deducted due to unpaid salaries on 23 November 2022.)	34	18	3	13	40	30	+10	51	
8	Nanjing City	34	14	8	12	45	38	+7	50	
9	Qingdao Youth Island	34	13	9	12	47	44	+3	48	
10	Heilongjiang Ice City (Note: Chinese Football Association awarded Heilongjiang Ice City a 3–0 win against Zibo Cuju after Zibo Cuju failed to name enough players to compete on 1 August 2022. Heilongjiang Ice City and Zibo Cuju had 6 points deducted due to unpaid salaries on 23 November 2022.)	34	13	7	14	48	48	0	40	
11	Guangxi Pingguo Haliao	34	6	17	11	32	38	−6	35 (Note: Guangxi Pingguo Haliao finished ahead of Liaoning Shenyang Urban on goal difference.)	
12	Liaoning Shenyang Urban	34	9	8	17	34	53	−19	35	
13	Shanghai Jiading Huilong	34	10	4	20	38	65	−27	34	
14	Jiangxi Beidamen (Note: Chinese Football Association awarded Jiangxi Beidamen and Kunshan each a 3–0 win against Beijing BIT after Beijing BIT failed to arrive in the centralised venues due to COVID-19 travel restrictions on 6 July 2022. Jiangxi Beidamen had 6 points deducted due to unpaid salaries on 23 November 2022. Later, Kunshan was classified to have lost 3-0.)	34	10	9	15	40	51	−11	33 (Note: Jiangxi Beidamen finished ahead of Zibo Cuju on goal difference: Jiangxi Beidamen 2–1 Zibo Cuju, Zibo Cuju 1–2 Jiangxi Beidamen.)	
15	Zibo Cuju (D)	34	11	6	17	37	53	−16	33	Dissolved
16	Beijing BSU (D, R)	34	6	6	22	24	59	−35	24	Dissolved
17	Xinjiang Tianshan Leopard (D, R)	34	6	3	25	31	83	−52	21	Dissolved
18	Beijing BIT (R)	34	2	4	28	18	77	−59	10	Relegation to League Two

Source: Soccerway
Rules for classification:
- During season: 1) Points; 2) Goal difference; 3) Goals scored
- After season: 1) Points; 2) Head-to-head points; 3) Head-to-head goal difference; 4) Head-to-head goals scored; 5) Goal difference; 6) Goals scored; 7) Disciplinary points (1 point for each yellow card, 3 points for each red card); 8) Draw
  (C) Champions; (D) Disqualified; (P) Promoted; (R) Relegated
  Notes:

== Results ==
Home \ Away	BIT	BSU	GPH	HLJ	JXB	KSH	LSU	NJC	NTZ	QDH	QYI	SCA	SJH	SJZ	SCJ	SZD	XJT	ZBC
Beijing BIT	—	1–1	0–1	2–2	0–3	3–0	1–2	0–2	0–3	0–2	1–3	0–4	0–0	0–5	0–2	0–2	2–1	0–1
Beijing BSU	4–0	—	1–0	3–1	0–1	3–0	1–2	1–3	0–1	0–2	2–2	0–3	2–1	0–2	0–2	2–2	1–1	0–1
Guangxi Pingguo Haliao	0–0	2–1	—	2–1	0–1	3–0	2–2	0–0	2–2	2–2	0–0	0–1	3–0	0–0	0–1	0–0	5–2	4–1
Heilongjiang Ice City	3–1	4–0	1–1	—	2–2	3–0	3–1	0–1	0–3	1–4	0–0	2–1	1–0	1–1	0–2	0–0	3–1	3–0
Jiangxi Beidamen	3–1	0–1	2–2	1–1	—	3–0	3–1	1–2	1–4	1–2	0–2	1–3	1–1	0–2	1–0	1–3	1–0	2–1
Kunshan	0–3	0–3	0–3	0–3	0–3	—	0–3	0–3	0–3	0–3	0–3	0–3	0–3	0–3	0–3	0–3	0–3	0–3
Liaoning Shenyang Urban	1–0	0–1	1–1	0–2	2–0	3–0	—	1–1	0–3	0–3	1–2	1–2	3–1	1–2	1–1	3–1	2–2	0–2
Nanjing City	3–1	2–0	0–0	1–2	1–1	3–0	2–0	—	2–1	0–1	1–0	2–3	1–3	0–0	1–2	1–2	2–1	2–3
Nantong Zhiyun	1–0	3–0	2–1	0–2	2–1	3–0	4–0	0–0	—	0–0	0–0	0–1	4–0	1–2	2–0	1–0	3–0	2–1
Qingdao Hainiu	2–0	3–0	3–0	5–1	1–1	3–0	2–0	2–0	1–1	—	1–1	1–1	2–0	0–1	1–2	2–1	5–1	4–2
Qingdao Youth Island	5–1	2–1	1–1	1–0	2–2	3–0	0–2	2–1	1–2	1–5	—	0–1	3–1	3–0	1–0	2–1	2–1	0–0
Shaanxi Chang'an Athletic	3–2	1–1	1–1	0–2	1–1	3–0	0–1	0–1	3–2	1–2	1–1	—	2–0	0–2	1–0	1–1	4–0	1–0
Shanghai Jiading Huilong	3–1	2–0	0–0	2–3	2–0	3–0	1–0	0–5	2–1	1–4	3–2	1–3	—	4–2	1–2	0–0	1–0	3–1
Shijiazhuang Gongfu	4–1	1–0	0–0	1–0	2–1	3–0	0–0	1–3	0–1	0–1	3–1	4–3	2–0	—	1–0	2–0	2–0	1–0
Sichuan Jiuniu	2–0	5–0	1–0	0–2	1–1	3–0	3–0	2–0	0–1	0–2	1–4	0–3	2–0	2–0	—	0–1	2–0	1–0
Suzhou Dongwu	1–0	0–0	3–0	2–1	2–1	3–0	2–1	0–0	0–3	0–3	2–0	1–0	3–2	1–2	0–1	—	3–0	3–0
Xinjiang Tianshan Leopard	0–3	1–0	1–0	2–1	1–3	3–0	0–3	2–3	1–4	1–7	3–2	0–2	2–1	1–2	1–1	1–0	—	1–2
Zibo Cuju	2–0	2–1	0–0	2–1	1–2	3–0	0–0	0–0	0–4	1–1	3–1	1–3	2–0	2–2	1–2	1–3	3–1	—

Source: Soccerway
Legend: Blue = home team win; Yellow = draw; Red = away team win.
For upcoming matches, an "a" indicates there is an article about the rivalry between the two participants.
- Chinese Football Association awarded Jiangxi Beidamen and Kunshan each a 3–0 win against Beijing BIT after Beijing BIT failed to arrive in the centralised venues due to COVID-19 travel restrictions. These matches were not played.
- Chinese Football Association awarded Heilongjiang Ice City a 3–0 win against Zibo Cuju after Zibo Cuju failed to name enough players to compete. The match was not played.

== Positions by round ==
To preserve chronological evolvements, any postponed matches are not included to the round at which they were originally scheduled, but added to the full round they were played immediately afterwards. For example, if a match is scheduled for round 7, but then played between rounds 8 and 9, it will be added to the standings for round 8.

Team ╲ Round	1	2	3	4	5	6	7	8	9	10	11	12	13	14	15	16	17	18	19	20	21	22	23	24	25	26	27	28	29	30	31	32	33	34
Kunshan	13	13	8	4	3	3	1	1	1	1	2	2	1	2	2	2	2	2	2	2	2	2	1	1	1	1	1	1	1	1	1	1	1	1
Qingdao Hainiu	8	3	7	5	4	4	4	6	3	3	3	3	3	3	3	3	3	3	3	3	3	3	3	3	3	3	3	3	3	3	3	2	2	2
Nantong Zhiyun	4	1	1	1	1	1	3	2	2	2	1	1	2	1	1	1	1	1	1	1	1	1	2	2	2	2	2	2	2	2	2	3	3	3
Shijiazhuang Gongfu	11	5	5	9	11	7	6	5	6	5	5	5	4	4	6	5	6	6	6	6	5	4	4	4	5	5	5	5	4	4	4	4	4	4
Shaanxi Chang'an Athletic	9	11	4	3	5	6	8	7	7	7	6	6	5	6	5	4	4	4	5	4	6	5	5	5	4	4	4	4	5	5	5	5	5	5
Suzhou Dongwu	15	17	13	8	10	13	15	15	16	10	8	12	9	10	9	10	10	11	9	9	7	7	7	7	7	7	7	7	7	7	7	7	6	6
Sichuan Jiuniu	3	4	2	2	2	2	2	3	4	4	4	4	6	5	4	6	5	5	4	5	4	6	6	6	6	6	6	6	6	6	6	6	7	7
Nanjing City	7	15	9	13	15	17	12	9	9	8	9	11	11	9	11	9	8	8	8	8	9	9	10	9	9	9	11	8	8	8	8	8	8	8
Qingdao Youth Island	16	18	18	15	14	16	10	14	8	9	11	9	8	8	8	8	9	7	7	7	8	8	8	8	8	10	8	9	9	9	9	9	9	9
Heilongjiang Ice City	1	6	3	7	9	5	5	4	5	6	7	7	7	7	7	7	7	10	11	11	11	11	11	11	11	11	10	11	10	10	10	11	10	10
Guangxi Pingguo Haliao	10	2	6	10	12	11	11	13	13	14	15	15	14	14	15	15	14	14	15	15	13	14	12	14	14	14	13	13	13	13	13	12	12	11
Liaoning Shenyang Urban	14	14	16	12	7	9	14	16	17	17	17	17	17	17	17	16	16	16	16	16	16	16	16	15	15	15	14	14	14	11	11	10	11	12
Shanghai Jiading Huilong	5	7	14	16	16	14	17	12	15	15	16	16	16	15	14	13	13	13	13	13	14	13	14	13	13	13	15	15	15	15	15	14	14	13
Jiangxi Beidamen	6	12	15	17	17	15	9	11	12	13	10	8	10	12	10	12	12	12	12	12	12	12	13	12	12	12	12	12	12	14	14	15	15	14
Zibo Cuju	2	8	10	11	13	12	16	17	14	16	12	13	12	11	12	11	11	9	10	10	10	10	9	10	10	8	9	10	11	12	12	13	13	15
Beijing BSU	18	10	12	14	8	10	13	10	10	11	13	10	13	13	13	14	15	15	14	14	15	15	15	16	16	16	16	17	16	16	16	16	16	16
Xinjiang Tianshan Leopard	17	9	11	6	6	8	7	8	11	12	14	14	15	16	16	17	17	17	17	17	17	17	17	17	17	17	17	16	17	17	17	17	17	17
Beijing BIT	12	16	17	18	18	18	18	18	18	18	18	18	18	18	18	18	18	18	18	18	18	18	18	18	18	18	18	18	18	18	18	18	18	18

Leader and promotion to Super League
Promotion to Super League
Relegation to League Two

Source: Soccerway
- Chinese Football Association awarded Jiangxi Beidamen and Kunshan each a 3–0 win against Beijing BIT after Beijing BIT failed to arrive in the centralised venues due to COVID-19 travel restrictions. These matches were not played. The decision was made between rounds 7 and 8.
- Chinese Football Association awarded Heilongjiang Ice City a 3–0 win against Zibo Cuju after Zibo Cuju failed to name enough players to compete. The match was not played and it was originally scheduled to be played in round 12.

== Results by match played ==
Team ╲ Round	1	2	3	4	5	6	7	8	9	10	11	12	13	14	15	16	17	18	19	20	21	22	23	24	25	26	27	28	29	30	31	32	33	34
Beijing BIT	L	L	L	L	L	L	L	L	L	D	L	D	L	L	L	L	L	L	L	L	L	L	D	L	L	L	L	L	W	L	L	L	D	W
Beijing BSU	L	W	D	L	W	L	L	W	D	L	D	W	L	L	L	L	L	L	W	L	L	L	D	L	L	L	L	D	W	L	L	L	D	L
Guangxi Pingguo Haliao	D	W	L	L	D	D	D	D	D	L	D	L	D	L	L	W	D	L	D	D	W	L	W	L	D	L	D	W	L	D	W	D	D	D
Heilongjiang Ice City	W	L	W	L	L	W	W	W	D	D	L	W	L	W	L	L	D	L	D	L	D	D	L	L	W	D	W	L	W	W	L	L	W	W
Jiangxi Beidamen	D	W	L	L	D	W	D	L	L	L	W	W	L	L	W	L	D	D	L	D	D	L	D	W	L	W	L	W	L	L	D	L	W	W
Kunshan	W	D	W	W	W	W	D	W	W	W	W	D	W	D	W	D	W	W	W	W	W	W	W	W	W	W	W	W	W	W	L	W	W	W
Liaoning Shenyang Urban	L	D	L	W	W	L	L	L	D	L	L	L	L	D	L	W	L	L	W	L	D	D	L	W	D	W	D	L	W	W	W	D	L	L
Nanjing City	D	L	W	L	L	L	W	W	D	W	L	L	D	W	L	W	W	D	D	W	D	L	L	W	L	D	L	W	D	W	W	W	L	W
Nantong Zhiyun	W	W	W	W	W	D	D	W	W	W	W	D	W	W	W	D	W	W	D	W	W	W	D	W	W	D	L	W	W	L	L	L	L	L
Qingdao Hainiu	D	W	L	W	W	W	D	L	W	W	W	W	W	D	W	W	W	L	D	W	L	W	D	W	W	W	W	W	W	W	D	W	W	D
Qingdao Youth Island	L	L	L	W	D	D	W	L	W	L	D	W	W	D	W	L	L	W	W	W	L	D	D	L	D	L	W	L	L	D	D	W	W	W
Shaanxi Chang'an Athletic	D	D	W	W	D	L	D	W	D	W	D	W	W	D	W	W	D	W	L	W	L	W	W	W	W	W	W	L	L	L	W	W	L	L
Shanghai Jiading Huilong	W	L	L	L	L	W	L	W	L	L	L	D	L	D	W	W	D	D	L	L	L	W	L	W	L	L	L	L	L	L	L	W	W	W
Shijiazhuang Gongfu	D	W	D	L	D	W	W	W	D	W	L	W	W	W	L	W	L	W	L	W	W	W	W	W	L	D	W	W	D	W	W	L	W	L
Sichuan Jiuniu	W	D	W	W	D	W	W	L	L	W	W	L	L	W	W	L	W	W	W	L	W	L	L	L	W	L	W	L	W	W	D	W	L	L
Suzhou Dongwu	L	L	W	W	L	L	L	D	D	W	W	L	W	D	W	L	D	D	W	W	W	W	L	L	W	L	W	D	L	W	W	W	D	W
Xinjiang Tianshan Leopard	L	W	D	W	D	L	W	L	L	L	L	L	L	L	L	L	L	L	L	L	L	L	W	L	D	W	L	W	L	L	L	L	L	L
Zibo Cuju	W	L	D	L	D	D	L	L	W	L	W	L	W	D	L	W	W	W	D	L	W	D	W	L	L	W	L	L	L	L	W	L	L	L

Source: Soccerway
W = Win; D = Draw; L = Loss
- Chinese Football Association awarded Jiangxi Beidamen and Kunshan each a 3–0 win against Beijing BIT after Beijing BIT failed to arrive in the centralised venues due to COVID-19 travel restrictions. These matches were not played.
- Chinese Football Association awarded Heilongjiang Ice City a 3–0 win against Zibo Cuju after Zibo Cuju failed to name enough players to compete. The match was not played.

== Goalscorers ==
=== Top scorers ===
As of 8 December 2022

Rank	Player	Club	Goals
1	(Nigeria) Kingsley Onuegbu	Qingdao Hainiu	27
2	(Guinea-Bissau) Zé Turbo	Nantong Zhiyun	20
3	(Cameroon) Messi Bouli	Nanjing City	16
3	(Serbia) Nemanja Čović	Kunshan	16
5	(China) Feng Boyuan	Kunshan	15
6	(China) Ji Shengpan	Zibo Cuju	12
7	(China) Men Yang	Suzhou Dongwu	11
7	(China) Sun Yue	Shanghai Jiading Huilong	11
7	(Brazil) Magno Cruz	Jiangxi Beidamen	11
10	(China) Ma Xiaolei	Sichuan Jiuniu	10
10	(Guinea-Bissau) Valdu Té	Qingdao Youth Island	10
10	(China) Tang Chuang	Suzhou Dongwu	10
10	(China) Xie Wenneng	Qingdao Hainiu	10
14	(Burkina Faso) Abdou Razack Traoré	Nantong Zhiyun	9
14	(China) Pang Zhiquan	Shaanxi Chang'an Athletic	9
14	(Serbia) Mladen Kovačević	Guangxi Pingguo Haliao	9

=== Hat-tricks ===
Player	For	Against	Result	Date
(Nigeria) Kingsley Onuegbu	Qingdao Hainiu	Zibo Cuju	4–2 (H)	24 July 2022
(Guinea-Bissau) Zé Turbo	Nantong Zhiyun	Jiangxi Beidamen	4–1 (A)	6 August 2022
(Guinea-Bissau) Valdu Té	Qingdao Youth Island	Shanghai Jiading Huilong	3–1 (H)	12 September 2022
(Nigeria) Kingsley Onuegbu	Qingdao Hainiu	Liaoning Shenyang Urban	3–0 (A)	9 November 2022
