= Mladen Kovačević =

Serbian footballer

Personal information
- Date of birth: 30 December 1994 (age 31)
- Place of birth: Sombor, FR Yugoslavia
- Height: 1.86 m (6 ft 1 in)
- Position: Forward

Youth career
- Radnički Sombor

Senior career*
| Years | Team | Apps | (Gls) |
| 2012–2014 | Radnički Sombor | | |
| 2014 | Ozren Sokobanja | | |
| 2015–2017 | Sloga Čonoplja | | |
| 2017–2019 | Bečej | 22 | (11) |
| 2019–2020 | Nantong Zhiyun | 37 | (11) |
| 2021 | Radnički Niš | 5 | (0) |
| 2022 | Guangxi Pingguo Haliao | 29 | (9) |
| 2023 | Dandong Tengyue | 25 | (7) |
| 2024 | Shijiazhuang Gongfu | 14 | (3) |
- * Club domestic league appearances and goals as of 23 July 2024

Mladen Kovačević (Serbian Cyrillic: Младен Ковачевић; born 30 December 1994) is a Serbian footballer who plays as a forward.

== Club career ==
On 3 February 2019, Kovačević joined China League One club Nantong Zhiyun.

On 12 May 2022, Kovačević returned to China and signed a with China League One club Guangxi Pingguo Haliao.

In April 2023, Kovačević joined fellow China League One club Dandong Tengyue.

On 29 February 2024, Kovačević joined fellow China League One club Shijiazhuang Gongfu.

== Career statistics ==
As of match played 15 June 2024

Appearances and goals by club, season and competition
| Club | Season | League | | | Cup | | Continental | | Other | | Total | |
| Club | Season | Division | Apps | Goals | Apps | Goals | Apps | Goals | Apps | Goals | Apps | Goals |
|---|---|---|---|---|---|---|---|---|---|---|---|---|
| Bečej | 2018–19 | Serbian First League | 22 | 11 | 0 | 0 | — | | — | | 22 | 11 |
| Nantong Zhiyun | 2019 | China League One | 22 | 6 | 0 | 0 | — | | — | | 22 | 6 |
| Nantong Zhiyun | 2020 | China League One | 15 | 5 | — | | — | | — | | 15 | 5 |
| Nantong Zhiyun | Total | | 47 | 11 | 0 | 0 | — | | — | | 47 | 11 |
| Radnički Niš | 2020–21 | Serbian SuperLiga | 5 | 0 | 0 | 0 | — | | — | | 5 | 0 |
| Guangxi Pingguo Haliao | 2022 | China League One | 29 | 9 | 1 | 0 | — | | — | | 30 | 9 |
| Dandong Tengyue | 2023 | China League One | 25 | 7 | 1 | 0 | — | | — | | 26 | 7 |
| Shijiazhuang Gongfu | 2024 | China League One | 14 | 3 | 1 | 1 | — | | — | | 15 | 4 |
| Career total | | | 142 | 41 | 3 | 1 | 0 | 0 | 0 | 0 | 145 | 42 |
