= Evans Etti =

Ghanaian footballer (born 2001)

Personal information
- Date of birth: 22 August 2001 (age 25)
- Place of birth: Nuba Western Region, Ghana
- Height: 1.75 m (5 ft 9 in)
- Position: Forward

Senior career*
Years	Team	Apps	(Gls)
2019–2024	Accra Lions		
2021–2022	→ Heilongjiang Ice City (loan)	34	(9)
2023–2024	→ Shanghai Jiading Huilong (loan)	58	(6)
2025	Bashundhara Kings	6	(0)
- * Club domestic league appearances and goals as of 23:14, 27 October 2023 (UTC)

Evans Etti (born 22 August 2001) is a Ghanaian footballer who currently plays as a forward.

== Club career ==
On 3 August 2021, Etti joined China League One club Heilongjiang Ice City on loan. On 7 May 2022, his loan was extended until the end of the 2022 season.

On 14 March 2023, Etti joined China League One club Shanghai Jiading Huilong on loan. On 4 February 2024, his loan was extended until the end of the 2024 season. On 25 May 2024 He assisted magno cruz in their 1–2 away lost to Yunnan Yukun. After months of impressive performances he also assisted magno cruz again against Jiangxi lushan on 13 July 2024.

== Career statistics ==
=== Club ===
As of 27 October 2023.

Club	Season	League			Cup		Other		Total	
Club	Season	Division	Apps	Goals	Apps	Goals	Apps	Goals	Apps	Goals
Heilongjiang Ice City (loan)	2021	China League One	5	1	0	0	0	0	5	1
Heilongjiang Ice City (loan)	2022	China League One	29	8	1	0	0	0	30	8
Heilongjiang Ice City (loan)	Subtotal		34	9	1	0	0	0	35	9
Shanghai Jiading Huilong (loan)	2023	China League One	28	5	0	0	0	0	28	5
Career total			62	14	1	0	0	0	63	14
