= 2021 China League One =

China League One
- Season: 2021
- Dates: 24 April – 22 December
- Champions: Wuhan Three Towns
- Promoted: Wuhan Three Towns; Meizhou Hakka; Zhejiang; Chengdu Rongcheng
- Matches: 306
- Goals: 830 (2.71 per match)
- Top goalscorer: Nyasha Mushekwi (23 goals)
- Biggest home win: Kunshan 6–0 Jiangxi Beidamen (15 May 2021); Chengdu Rongcheng 6–0 Xinjiang Tianshan Leopard (11 August 2021)
- Biggest away win: Xinjiang Tianshan Leopard 0–7 Chengdu Rongcheng (23 July 2021); Guizhou 2–9 Chengdu Rongcheng (21 December 2021)
- Highest scoring: Guizhou 2–9 Chengdu Rongcheng (21 December 2021)
- Longest winning run: 14 matches Wuhan Three Towns
- Longest unbeaten run: 18 matches Wuhan Three Towns
- Longest winless run: 32 matches Xinjiang Tianshan Leopard
- Longest losing run: 8 matches Jiangxi Beidamen; Suzhou Dongwu

The 2021 China League One (Chinese: 2021中国足球协会甲级联赛) is the 18th season of the China League One, the second tier of the Chinese football league pyramid, since its establishment in 2004.

== Effects of the COVID-19 pandemic ==
The 2021 China League One season was scheduled to start on 17 March 2021, but later was postponed.

On 1 April, the Chinese Football Association announced that the season would start on 24 April 2021 and the format of the season. The season was divided into 4 stages (10, 8, 8 and 8 rounds respectively). In the first stage, 18 teams were divided into 3 groups based on the hosts and last season's rankings. In the second, third and fourth stage, the teams in 3 groups will be switched to ensure that each team can play against each other 2 times.

=== Groups ===
The draw for the stages took place on 1 April 2021.

Team		Draw order	No.	Group			
Team		Draw order	No.	First S.	Second S.	Third S.	Fourth S.
Meizhou Hakka	Host	—	A1	A	D	G	J
Zhejiang	2nd, 2020 season	1	A2	A	D	G	J
Shaanxi Chang'an Athletic	10th, 2020 season	6	A3	A	E	H	K
Sichuan Jiuniu	11th, 2020 season	7	A4	A	E	H	K
Zibo Cuju	2nd, CL2, 2020 season	12	A5	A	F	I	L
Xinjiang Tianshan Leopard	18th, 2020 season	13	A6	A	F	I	L
Chengdu Rongcheng	Host	—	B1	B	F	H	J
Kunshan	3rd, 2020 season	2	B2	B	F	H	J
Beijing BSU	9th, 2020 season	5	B3	B	D	I	K
Nantong Zhiyun	12th, 2020 season	8	B4	B	D	I	K
Jiangxi Beidamen	16th, 2020 season	11	B5	B	E	G	L
Nanjing City	3rd, CL2, 2020 season	14	B6	B	E	G	L
Wuhan Three Towns	Host	—	C1	C	E	I	J
Guizhou	7th, 2020 season	3	C2	C	E	I	J
Suzhou Dongwu	8th, 2020 season	4	C3	C	F	G	K
Liaoning Shenyang Urban	14th, 2020 season	9	C4	C	F	G	K
Heilongjiang Ice City	15th, 2020 season	10	C5	C	D	H	L
Beijing BIT	4th, CL2, 2020 season	15	C6	C	D	H	L

==== Centralised venues ====
- Meizhou (Group A, D, G, J)
  - Hengbei Football Town Field 9
  - Meixian Tsang Hin-chi Stadium
  - Wuhua County Olympic Sports Centre
  - Wuhua County Stadium
- Dalian (Group B, F, H)
  - Dalian Sports Centre Stadium Field 3
  - Dalian Youth Football Training Base Main Stadium
  - Jinzhou Stadium
- Chengdu (Group L)
  - Chengdong Sports Park Stadium
  - Chengdu Longquanyi Football Stadium
  - Dujiangyan Phoenix Stadium
  - Shuangliu Sports Centre
- Wuhan (Group C, E, I, K)
  - Hankou Cultural Sports Centre
  - Tazi Lake Football Base Field 1
  - Tazi Lake Football Base Field 3
  - Wuhan Five Rings Sports Center

==== Dates ====
- First stage (Round 1–10): 24 April – 10 June
- Second stage (Round 11–18): 11 July – 17 August
- Third stage (Round 19–26): 3 September – 5 October
- Fourth Stage (Round 27–34): 20 November – 22 December

== Teams ==
=== Team changes ===
==== To League One ====
Teams promoted from 2020 China League Two

- Wuhan Three Towns
- Zibo Cuju
- Nanjing City
- Beijing BIT

==== From League One ====
Teams promoted to 2021 Chinese Super League

- Changchun Yatai

Dissolved entries

- ~~Beijing Renhe~~
- ~~Inner Mongolia Zhongyou~~
- ~~Taizhou Yuanda~~

=== Name changes ===
Ahead of the 2021 season, the Chinese Football Association ordered all clubs to eliminate any corporate references in their names.

- Chengdu Better City F.C. changed their name to Chengdu Rongcheng in January 2021.
- Guizhou Hengfeng F.C. changed their name to Guizhou in January 2021.
- Nanjing Fengfan F.C. changed their name to Nanjing City in January 2021.
- Jiangxi Liansheng F.C. changed their name to Jiangxi Beidamen in February 2021.
- Heilongjiang Lava Spring F.C. changed their name to Heilongjiang Ice City in February 2021.
- Zhejiang Energy Greentown F.C. changed their name to Zhejiang in February 2021.

== Clubs ==
=== Stadiums and locations ===
Team	Head coach	City	Stadium	Capacity	2020 season
Zhejiang	(Spain) Jordi Vinyals	Hangzhou	Huzhou Olympic Sports Centre	40,000	2nd (Promotion play-offs loser)
Kunshan	(Spain) Sergio Zarco Díaz	Kunshan	Kunshan Sports Centre Stadium	30,000	3rd
Chengdu Rongcheng	(South Korea) Seo Jung-won	Chengdu	Chengdu Longquanyi Football Stadium	27,000	4th
Meizhou Hakka	(Serbia) Milan Ristić	Wuhua	Huitang Stadium	30,000	5th
Guizhou	(China) Yuan Yi	Guiyang	Guiyang Olympic Sports Center	51,636	7th
Suzhou Dongwu	(England) Gary White	Suzhou	Suzhou Olympic Sports Centre	45,000	8th
Beijing BSU	(China) Zhang Xu	Beijing	Olympic Sports Centre	36,228	9th
Shaanxi Chang'an Athletic	(China) Feng Feng (caretaker)	Xi'an	Weinan Sports Center Stadium	32,000	10th
Sichuan Jiuniu	(China) Li Yi	Chengdu	Chengdu Longquanyi Football Stadium	27,000	11th
Nantong Zhiyun	(China) Cao Rui	Rugao	Rugao Olympic Sports Center	15,000	12th
Liaoning Shenyang Urban	(China) Yu Ming	Shenyang	Shenyang Urban Construction University Stadium	12,000	14th
Heilongjiang Ice City	(China) Duan Xin	Harbin	Harbin ICE Sports Center	50,000	15th (Relegation play-offs winner)
Jiangxi Beidamen	(China) Huang Yong	Ruichang	Ruichang Sports Park Stadium	N/A	16th (Relegation play-offs winner)
Wuhan Three Towns ^{P}	(Spain) Pedro Morilla	Wuhan	Hankou Cultural Sports Centre	20,000	CL2, 1st
Zibo Cuju ^{P}	(China) Huang Hongyi	Zibo	Zibo Sports Center Stadium	45,000	CL2, 2nd
Xinjiang Tianshan Leopard	(China) Polat Kutulk	Ürümqi	Xinjiang Sports Centre	50,000	18th (Relegation play-offs loser)
Nanjing City ^{P}	(Italy) Fulvio Pea	Nanjing	Nanjing Youth Olympic Sports Park	18,000	CL2, 3rd
Beijing BIT ^{P}	(China) Yu Fei	Beijing	BIT Eastern Athletic Field	5,000	CL2, 4th

=== Club locations ===
Location of teams in 2021 China League One

=== Managerial changes ===
Team	Outgoing manager	Manner of departure	Date of vacancy	Position in table	Incoming manager	Date of appointment
Shaanxi Chang'an Athletic	(South Korea) Kim Bong-gil	Mutual consent	29 November 2020	Pre-season	(Spain) Óscar Céspedes	23 January 2021
Chengdu Rongcheng	(Spain) José Carlos Granero	Mutual consent	7 December 2020	Pre-season	(South Korea) Seo Jung-won	12 December 2020
Zhejiang	(China) Zheng Xiong	Mutual consent	31 December 2020	Pre-season	(Spain) Jordi Vinyals	1 January 2021
Meizhou Hakka	(Brazil) Marcelo Rospide	Mutual consent	6 February 2021	Pre-season	(Serbia) Milan Ristić	6 February 2021
Zibo Cuju	(China) Hou Zhiqiang	Mutual consent	19 February 2021	Pre-season	(South Korea) Park Chul	19 February 2021
Xinjiang Tianshan Leopard	(China) Polat Kutulk (caretaker)	End of caretaker spell	30 March 2021	Pre-season	(China) Pei Encai	30 March 2021
Nanjing City	(China) Tang Bo	Mutual consent	18 April 2021	Pre-season	(Italy) Fulvio Pea	18 April 2021
Beijing BSU	(China) Su Maozhen	Mutual consent		Pre-season	(China) Zhang Xu	
Zibo Cuju	(South Korea) Park Chul	Mutual consent		Pre-season	(China) Huang Hongyi	
Wuhan Three Towns	(Spain) Albert Garcia Xicota	Sacked	25 July 2021	5th	(Spain) Pedro Morilla	25 July 2021 (Note: Morilla was initially caretaker manager, but was then appointed as manager until the end of the season on 9 December 2021.)
Nantong Zhiyun	(China) Xie Hui	Resigned	22 August 2021	7th	(China) Cao Rui	26 August 2021
Kunshan	(China) Gao Yao	Sacked	16 September 2021	9th	(Spain) Sergio Zarco Díaz	16 September 2021
Xinjiang Tianshan Leopard	(China) Pei Encai	Mutual consent	2 October 2021	17th	(China) Qeriazdan Ashar	2 October 2021
Shaanxi Chang'an Athletic	(Spain) Óscar Céspedes	Sacked	October 2021	7th	(China) Feng Feng (caretaker)	October 2021
Guizhou	(China) Chen Mao	Sacked	27 November 2021	9th	(China) Yuan Yi	27 November 2021
Xinjiang Tianshan Leopard	(China) Qeriazdan Ashar	Mutual Consent	11 December 2021	18th	(China) Polat Kutulk (caretaker)	11 December 2021

== Foreign players ==
The number of foreign players clubs can register over the course of the season is limited to four and the number of foreign players allowed on each team at any given time is limited to three. A maximum of three foreign players can be registered for each match with a maximum of two can be fielded at any time during the match. In addition, each club can register a Hong Kong, Macau, or Taiwan player of Chinese descent (excluding goalkeepers), provided that he registered as a professional footballer in one of those three association for the first time, as a native player.

- Players name in **bold** indicates the player is registered during the mid-season transfer window.

Team	Player 1	Player 2	Player 3	Hong Kong/Macau/ Taiwan Players^{1}	Naturalized Players	Former Players
Beijing BIT						
Beijing BSU				(Chinese Taipei) Wen Chih-hao		
Chengdu Rongcheng	(Brazil) **Felipe**	(Brazil) Naldinho	(Brazil) Rômulo			(Brazil) Johnathan
Guizhou	(Albania) Jahmir Hyka	(Serbia) Stefan Mihajlović				(Brazil) Sérgio Mota
Heilongjiang Ice City	(Cameroon) Donovan Ewolo	(Ghana) **Rashid Abubakar**	(Ghana) **Evans Etti**			(Republic of the Congo) Thievy Bifouma
Jiangxi Beidamen	(Albania) Vasil Shkurti	(Brazil) Éder		(Hong Kong) Andy Russell		(Brazil) Magno Cruz
Kunshan	(Brazil) Bruno Pires	(Cape Verde) Hildeberto Pereira			(Peru) → (China) Xiao Taotao	
Liaoning Shenyang Urban						
Meizhou Hakka	(Brazil) Igor Sartori	(Nigeria) Chisom Egbuchulam		(Hong Kong) Vas Nuñez		(Guinea) Lonsana Doumbouya
Nanjing City	(Albania) **Albi Alla**	(Cameroon) Raphaël Messi Bouli	(Latvia) **Ritus Krjauklis**			
Nantong Zhiyun	(Brazil) Mychell Chagas	(Burkina Faso) **Abdou Razack Traoré**	(Guinea-Bissau) Zé Turbo	(Hong Kong) Li Ngai Hoi	(Spain) → (China) David Wang (Switzerland) → (China) Ming-yang Yang	
Shaanxi Chang'an Athletic	(Cameroon) Raoul Loé	(Cameroon) Robert Tambe	(Nigeria) Kingsley Onuegbu	(Chinese Taipei) Wang Chien-ming		
Sichuan Jiuniu	(Australia) **Pierce Waring**	(Guinea) Mohamed Yattara	(Serbia) Nemanja Vidić		(Japan) → (China) Xia Dalong	
Suzhou Dongwu	(Democratic Republic of the Congo) **Junior Kabananga**					
Wuhan Three Towns	(Brazil) Ademilson	(Brazil) **Marcão**	(Nigeria) Moses Ogbu	(Chinese Taipei) Yaki Yen		(Brazil) Jadson
Xinjiang Tianshan Leopard	(Serbia) **Nemanja Spasojević**	(Serbia) **Uroš Tomović**				
Zhejiang	(Brazil) **Matheus**	(Croatia) **Franko Andrijašević**	(Zimbabwe) Nyasha Mushekwi	(Hong Kong) Leung Nok Hang		(Serbia) Nikola Đurđić
Zibo Cuju						(Albania) Albi Alla (Portugal) João Silva

- **^1** For Hong Kong, Macau, or Taiwanese players, if they are non-naturalized and were registered as professional footballers in Hong Kong's, Macau's, or Chinese Taipei's football association for the first time, they are recognized as native players. Otherwise they are recognized as foreign players.

== League table ==
Pos	Team	Pld	W	D	L	GF	GA	GD	Pts	Promotion, qualification or relegation
1	Wuhan Three Towns (C, P)	34	25	4	5	73	25	+48	79	Promotion to Super League
2	Meizhou Hakka (P)	34	24	3	7	79	35	+44	75	Promotion to Super League
3	Zhejiang (O, P)	34	22	8	4	69	28	+41	74	Qualification for Promotion play-offs
4	Chengdu Rongcheng (O, P)	34	21	8	5	81	28	+53	71	Qualification for Promotion play-offs
5	Nantong Zhiyun	34	20	5	9	62	30	+32	65	
6	Shaanxi Chang'an Athletic	34	17	11	6	55	30	+25	62	
7	Heilongjiang Ice City	34	15	11	8	50	40	+10	56	
8	Sichuan Jiuniu	34	13	13	8	34	27	+7	52	
9	Kunshan	34	13	12	9	56	35	+21	51	
10	Nanjing City	34	12	9	13	41	42	−1	45	
11	Zibo Cuju	34	10	9	15	32	52	−20	39 (Note: Zibo Cuju finished ahead of Guizhou on goal difference: Zibo Cuju 0–1 Guizhou, Guizhou 1–2 Zibo Cuju; Goal difference: Zibo Cuju -20 and Guizhou -30.)	
12	Guizhou (D)	34	10	9	15	26	56	−30	39	Dissolved after season
13	Suzhou Dongwu	34	7	11	16	36	53	−17	32	
14	Jiangxi Beidamen	34	7	8	19	29	68	−39	29	
15	Beijing BSU	34	6	10	18	37	53	−16	28	
16	Liaoning Shenyang Urban	34	7	4	23	30	62	−32	25	
17	Beijing BIT (T)	34	3	5	26	24	82	−58	14	Qualification for Relegation play-offs
18	Xinjiang Tianshan Leopard (T)	34	1	6	27	16	84	−68	9	Qualification for Relegation play-offs

Source: CFA
Rules for classification:
- During season: 1) Points; 2) Goal difference; 3) Goals scored
- After season: 1) Points; 2) Head-to-head points; 3) Head-to-head goal difference; 4) Head-to-head goals scored; 5) Goal difference; 6) Goals scored; 7) Disciplinary points (1 point for each yellow card, 3 points for each red card); 8) Draw
  (C) Champions; (D) Disqualified; (O) Play-off winners; (P) Promoted; (T) Qualified, but not yet for the particular phase indicated
  Notes:

== Results ==
Home \ Away	BIT	BSU	CDR	GZH	HLJ	JXB	KSH	LSU	MZH	NJC	NTZ	SCA	SCJ	SZD	WTT	XJT	ZHJ	ZBC
Beijing BIT	—	2–3	0–2	2–0	0–4	1–2	0–0	1–2	1–6	0–3	0–1	1–1	0–1	2–2	1–3	2–2	0–5	0–2
Beijing BSU	0–1	—	0–2	1–1	1–1	0–1	1–2	2–1	1–3	0–1	1–2	0–2	1–2	2–3	0–1	2–2	1–0	3–0
Chengdu Rongcheng	5–0	4–1	—	5–0	0–2	0–2	3–3	2–0	0–0	2–0	1–0	3–1	2–1	3–2	1–0	6–0	1–2	0–0
Guizhou	3–1	0–0	2–9	—	0–1	0–0	0–4	0–2	0–5	1–2	0–2	3–1	0–0	1–0	1–1	1–0	0–0	1–2
Heilongjiang Ice City	3–0	1–1	2–1	0–0	—	4–0	2–5	1–0	3–2	1–0	0–0	1–1	1–1	1–0	0–4	1–0	1–1	1–2
Jiangxi Beidamen	2–2	1–1	2–4	0–1	2–2	—	1–1	1–2	0–4	0–1	1–3	0–5	2–2	0–1	0–4	1–0	1–1	1–5
Kunshan	4–0	2–2	1–1	1–0	0–1	6–0	—	1–0	0–1	1–1	1–1	1–1	1–1	4–1	1–2	1–0	1–2	0–1
Liaoning Shenyang Urban	3–2	0–2	0–6	0–1	1–2	0–1	2–1	—	2–4	3–3	0–3	1–4	1–2	1–1	1–3	1–0	2–2	0–1
Meizhou Hakka	5–0	2–1	1–2	4–2	2–3	4–1	1–1	2–0	—	4–2	2–1	3–2	1–0	3–1	0–2	2–1	0–1	4–0
Nanjing City	1–0	0–0	0–0	0–1	2–2	1–0	1–2	2–1	1–2	—	1–1	0–2	1–1	2–1	2–1	5–0	1–4	2–0
Nantong Zhiyun	3–0	2–1	1–2	0–1	4–3	3–2	1–0	4–0	0–1	3–1	—	1–2	2–0	3–1	1–2	3–0	1–1	4–2
Shaanxi Chang'an Athletic	2–0	2–0	0–0	4–1	0–0	3–2	0–2	1–0	0–1	2–0	1–1	—	1–0	3–0	1–1	4–1	2–2	2–0
Sichuan Jiuniu	1–0	1–1	1–1	1–0	1–0	3–0	1–1	1–0	0–0	2–0	0–2	0–1	—	0–0	0–1	2–1	1–0	0–0
Suzhou Dongwu	2–1	2–2	1–2	1–1	3–1	1–2	1–1	1–0	1–3	0–0	0–1	0–0	1–2	—	0–4	1–1	0–1	1–1
Wuhan Three Towns	3–1	4–0	2–1	0–1	3–1	1–0	2–0	2–3	1–0	2–2	2–0	3–1	5–1	1–1	—	3–0	2–1	3–1
Xinjiang Tianshan Leopard	1–3	0–5	0–7	1–1	0–3	0–1	1–3	0–0	0–2	0–2	0–3	0–1	0–5	0–3	0–1	—	0–2	3–2
Zhejiang	3–0	3–0	1–3	6–1	3–1	2–0	2–1	1–0	5–4	1–0	1–0	1–1	0–0	3–0	2–1	4–1	—	2–1
Zibo Cuju	2–0	2–1	0–0	0–1	0–0	0–0	1–3	2–1	0–1	2–1	0–5	1–1	0–0	1–3	0–3	1–1	0–4	—

Legend: Blue = home team win; Yellow = draw; Red = away team win.
For upcoming matches, an "a" indicates there is an article about the rivalry between the two participants.

== Positions by round ==
To preserve chronological evolvements, any postponed matches are not included to the round at which they were originally scheduled, but added to the full round they were played immediately afterwards. For example, if a match is scheduled for round 7, but then played between rounds 8 and 9, it will be added to the standings for round 8.

Team ╲ Round	1	2	3	4	5	6	7	8	9	10	11	12	13	14	15	16	17	18	19	20	21	22	23	24	25	26	27	28	29	30	31	32	33	34
Wuhan Three Towns	3	1	5	3	4	3	2	2	5	4	3	4	5	4	4	4	4	4	3	3	3	2	2	2	2	2	2	2	1	1	2	1	1	1
Meizhou Hakka	5	3	8	5	2	1	1	1	1	1	1	2	2	2	2	3	2	2	2	1	1	1	1	1	1	1	1	1	2	2	1	2	2	2
Zhejiang	1	5	2	7	3	2	3	3	4	2	5	3	3	3	3	2	3	3	4	4	4	4	4	4	4	3	3	3	3	4	4	4	3	3
Chengdu Rongcheng	2	2	3	1	1	4	4	6	3	3	2	1	1	1	1	1	1	1	1	2	2	3	3	3	3	4	4	4	4	3	3	3	4	4
Nantong Zhiyun	10	6	4	2	6	6	5	4	2	5	4	5	4	5	6	7	6	7	7	6	7	6	5	5	6	5	5	5	5	5	5	5	5	5
Shaanxi Chang'an Athletic	6	10	6	8	5	5	6	5	6	7	6	7	6	6	5	5	5	5	5	5	5	5	6	7	7	7	7	6	6	6	6	6	6	6
Heilongjiang Ice City	16	18	11	9	8	7	8	7	7	6	7	6	7	7	8	8	8	8	8	9	8	7	8	8	8	8	8	8	8	7	7	7	7	7
Sichuan Jiuniu	13	14	15	11	12	14	12	13	11	10	9	10	9	10	10	9	10	10	10	10	10	10	10	10	9	9	9	9	9	9	9	8	9	8
Kunshan	8	12	14	10	10	8	7	8	8	8	8	8	8	8	7	6	7	6	6	7	9	9	7	6	5	6	6	7	7	8	8	9	8	9
Nanjing City	10	15	9	12	11	11	13	10	12	13	13	11	12	12	12	12	13	12	12	12	12	12	12	11	11	11	11	11	11	11	10	10	10	10
Zibo Cuju	18	17	17	17	18	18	18	16	17	15	15	14	15	14	14	14	14	14	14	14	14	15	14	14	14	14	14	13	12	13	12	12	12	11
Guizhou	6	4	1	6	9	10	10	11	13	9	10	9	10	9	9	10	9	9	9	8	6	8	9	9	10	10	10	10	10	10	11	11	11	12
Suzhou Dongwu	3	7	7	4	7	9	9	9	9	12	12	12	11	11	11	11	11	11	11	11	11	11	11	12	12	12	12	12	13	12	13	13	13	13
Jiangxi Beidamen	15	11	12	15	16	13	14	14	14	14	14	16	14	16	16	16	16	16	16	16	16	16	16	15	16	16	16	16	15	15	16	14	14	14
Beijing BSU	8	12	16	16	17	17	17	18	18	18	16	15	16	15	15	15	15	15	15	15	15	14	15	16	15	15	15	15	16	16	14	15	15	15
Liaoning Shenyang Urban	13	9	10	13	13	12	11	12	10	11	11	13	13	13	13	13	12	13	13	13	13	13	13	13	13	13	13	14	14	14	15	16	16	16
Beijing BIT	16	16	18	18	15	15	16	17	15	16	17	18	18	18	18	17	17	17	17	17	17	17	17	18	18	17	17	17	17	17	17	17	17	17
Xinjiang Tianshan Leopard	12	8	13	14	14	15	15	15	16	17	18	17	17	17	17	18	18	18	18	18	18	18	18	17	17	18	18	18	18	18	18	18	18	18

Leader and promotion to Super League
Runner-up and promotion to Super League
Qualification for Promotion play-offs
Qualification for Relegation play-offs

== Results by match played ==
Team ╲ Round	1	2	3	4	5	6	7	8	9	10	11	12	13	14	15	16	17	18	19	20	21	22	23	24	25	26	27	28	29	30	31	32	33	34
Beijing BIT	L	L	L	L	W	L	L	L	D	L	L	L	L	L	L	W	L	L	L	D	L	L	L	L	L	D	L	L	D	D	L	L	W	L
Beijing BSU	D	L	L	L	L	L	D	L	L	D	W	W	L	D	L	L	L	D	W	L	D	D	L	L	W	D	D	L	D	W	L	L	L	W
Chengdu Rongcheng	W	W	D	W	W	L	D	D	W	W	W	W	W	D	W	W	W	D	W	D	W	L	W	W	D	L	L	D	W	W	W	W	L	W
Guizhou	W	W	W	L	L	L	D	D	D	W	L	W	D	W	D	L	W	L	W	W	W	D	L	D	L	D	L	D	L	L	L	L	L	L
Heilongjiang Ice City	L	L	W	W	W	W	L	W	D	W	L	W	L	D	D	W	D	D	D	D	W	W	L	D	L	W	D	D	W	W	W	L	D	W
Jiangxi Beidamen	L	W	L	L	L	W	D	L	L	D	L	D	D	L	L	L	L	L	L	L	L	W	W	D	L	L	D	W	D	D	L	W	L	W
Kunshan	D	L	D	W	W	W	D	D	D	D	W	L	W	D	W	W	L	W	D	D	L	D	W	W	W	D	L	L	W	L	L	L	W	D
Liaoning Shenyang Urban	L	W	L	L	L	W	W	D	W	L	L	L	L	W	L	L	W	D	D	L	L	L	L	L	D	W	L	L	L	L	L	L	L	L
Meizhou Hakka	W	W	L	W	W	W	W	L	W	D	W	L	W	W	W	L	W	W	W	W	W	W	W	W	W	W	W	D	L	W	W	L	L	D
Nanjing City	D	L	W	L	W	L	D	W	D	D	L	W	L	L	L	D	D	W	L	D	W	L	L	W	D	L	W	W	L	W	W	W	D	L
Nantong Zhiyun	D	W	W	W	L	W	D	W	W	L	W	L	W	L	D	D	W	L	L	W	L	W	W	W	L	W	W	W	W	L	W	W	W	D
Shaanxi Chang'an Athletic	W	L	W	D	W	W	L	W	D	D	W	L	D	W	W	W	L	W	D	D	L	W	L	D	D	D	W	W	W	W	D	W	W	D
Sichuan Jiuniu	L	D	D	W	L	L	W	D	W	D	W	D	W	L	D	W	D	L	D	D	W	D	W	L	W	D	D	W	L	D	W	W	L	W
Suzhou Dongwu	W	L	W	W	D	L	D	D	D	L	L	D	W	D	L	W	D	L	W	D	L	L	L	L	L	L	L	L	D	D	D	L	W	L
Wuhan Three Towns	W	W	L	W	D	W	W	D	L	W	W	L	D	W	W	D	W	W	W	W	W	W	W	W	W	W	W	W	W	W	L	W	W	L
Xinjiang Tianshan Leopard	L	W	L	L	L	L	D	L	L	L	L	D	L	L	L	L	L	D	L	L	D	L	L	D	L	L	L	L	D	L	L	L	L	L
Zhejiang	W	D	W	D	W	W	L	W	D	W	L	W	W	W	W	D	D	W	D	W	W	W	W	D	W	W	W	D	L	L	W	W	W	W
Zibo Cuju	L	L	D	L	L	L	D	D	L	D	W	W	L	D	W	L	D	D	L	L	L	L	W	L	W	L	W	D	D	L	W	W	W	W

W = Win; D = Draw; L = Loss

== Promotion play-offs ==
Zhejiang and Chengdu Rongcheng will play the bottom two teams in the 2021 Chinese Super League (7th and 8th in the Relegation stage) in two-legged playoffs.

== Relegation play-offs ==
=== Overview ===
Team 1	Agg.	Team 2	1st leg	2nd leg
Qingdao Youth Island	2–2 (5–4 p)	Beijing BIT	0–0	2–2 (a.e.t.)
Xinjiang Tianshan Leopard	0–1	Guangxi Pingguo Haliao	0–1	0–0

=== Matches ===
26 December 2021
14:30 UTC+8

Qingdao Youth Island	0–0	Beijing BIT

Hengbei Football Town Field 9, Meizhou
Attendance: 0 (Note: The match was played behind closed doors due to the COVID-19 pandemic.)
Referee: Ma Yunkun
30 December 2021
14:30 UTC+8

Beijing BIT	2–2 (a.e.t.)	Qingdao Youth Island
Geng Junyi 90'; Wang Zhengyin 120+2' (pen.)		Tian Yong 38'; Sun Jiangshan 117'
Penalties
Wang Si (penalty scored); Zhang Chengyu (penalty missed); Wang Zhengyin (penalty scored); Guo Mengjie (penalty scored); Geng Junyi (penalty scored)	4–5	(penalty scored) Ju Feng; (penalty scored) Wang Xingqiang; (penalty scored) Sun Jiangshan; (penalty scored) Chen Ao; (penalty scored) Wang Long

Hengbei Football Town Field 9, Meizhou
Attendance: 0
Referee: Gao Peng

2–2 on aggregate. Qingdao Youth Island won 5–4 on penalties.

26 December 2021
14:30 UTC+8

Xinjiang Tianshan Leopard	0–1	Guangxi Pingguo Haliao
		Wang Ziming 81'

Wuhua County Olympic Sports Centre, Meizhou
Attendance: 0
Referee: Ren Tong
30 December 2021
14:30 UTC+8

Guangxi Pingguo Haliao	0–0	Xinjiang Tianshan Leopard

Wuhua County Olympic Sports Centre, Meizhou
Attendance: 0
Referee: Liang Songshang

Guangxi Pingguo Haliao won 1–0 on aggregate.

== Statistics ==
=== Top scorers ===
As of 12 January 2022

Rank	Player	Club	Goals
1	(Zimbabwe) Nyasha Mushekwi	Zhejiang	24
2	(Nigeria) Chisom Egbuchulam	Meizhou Hakka	20
2	(Nigeria) Kingsley Onuegbu	Shaanxi Chang'an Athletic	20
4	(Nigeria) Moses Ogbu	Wuhan Three Towns	18
5	(Cameroon) Raphaël Messi Bouli	Nanjing City	15
6	(China) Liang Xueming	Meizhou Hakka	14
6	(Brazil) Naldinho	Chengdu Rongcheng	14
6	(Cameroon) Donovan Ewolo	Heilongjiang Ice City	14
6	(Cameroon) Robert Tambe	Shaanxi Chang'an Athletic	14
6	(Guinea-Bissau) Zé Turbo	Nantong Zhiyun	14

=== Hat-tricks ===
Player	For	Against	Result	Date
(Guinea) Lonsana Doumbouya	Meizhou Hakka	Shaanxi Chang'an Athletic	3–2 (H)	24 May 2021
(Nigeria) Moses Ogbu	Wuhan Three Towns	Suzhou Dongwu	4–0 (A)	10 June 2021
(China) Xiang Baixu	Chengdu Rongcheng	Xinjiang Tianshan Leopard	7–0 (A)	23 July 2021
(Zimbabwe) Nyasha Mushekwi	Zhejiang	Beijing BIT	3–0 (H)	15 August 2021
(Cameroon) Raphaël Messi Bouli	Nanjing City	Liaoning Shenyang Urban	3–3 (A)	30 September 2021
(Brazil) Felipe	Chengdu Rongcheng	Guizhou	9–2 (A)	21 December 2021
(China) Meng Junjie	Chengdu Rongcheng	Guizhou	9–2 (A)	21 December 2021
