= Magno Cruz =

Brazilian footballer

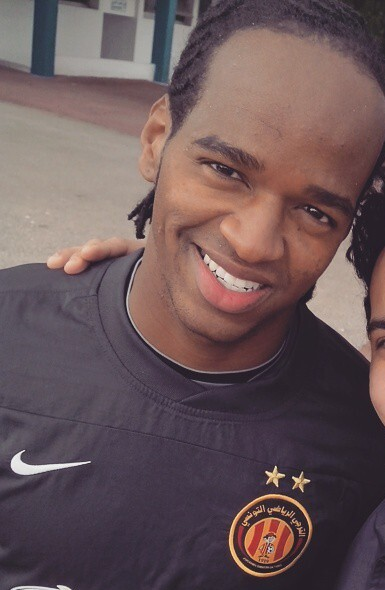
- Cruz in 2015

Personal information
- Full name: Magno Damasceno Santos da Cruz
- Date of birth: May 20, 1988 (age 38)
- Place of birth: Salvador, Brazil
- Height: 1.74 m (5 ft 9 in)
- Position: Midfielder

Team information
- Current team: Shanghai Jiading Huilong

Youth career
- Vitória
- Bahia
- Joinville
- 2005–2007: Cruzeiro
- 2008: Flamengo

Senior career*
| Years | Team | Apps | (Gls) |
| 2008 | Marítimo | 0 | (0) |
| 2009 | Brasil de Pelotas | 14 | (3) |
| 2009–2012 | Vasco da Gama | 23 | (1) |
| 2011–2012 | → Bahia (loan) | 10 | (0) |
| 2012–2013 | Bahia | 18 | (3) |
| 2012 | → Ceará (loan) | 20 | (2) |
| 2013 | → Bragantino (loan) | 38 | (2) |
| 2014 | Bragantino | 39 | (1) |
| 2014–2015 | ES Tunis | 10 | (1) |
| 2015 | Cerezo Osaka | 8 | (1) |
| 2016 | Atlético Goianiense | 48 | (11) |
| 2017–2019 | Jeju United | 102 | (29) |
| 2020 | Umm Salal | 1 | (0) |
| 2020 | CRB | 18 | (0) |
| 2021–2023 | Jiangxi Beidamen | 61 | (20) |
| 2021 | → Tianjin Jinmen Tiger (loan) | 17 | (4) |
| 2024– | Shanghai Jiading Huilong | 27 | (3) |
- * Club domestic league appearances and goals as of 09:35, 5 March 2025 (UTC)

Magno Damasceno Santos da Cruz (born May 20, 1988) is a Brazilian professional footballer who plays as a midfielder for China League One club Shanghai Jiading Huilong.

== Career ==
In April 2021, Cruz joined China League One club Jiangxi Beidamen. In July 2021, Cruz joined Chinese Super League club Tianjin Jinmen Tiger on loan.

On 25 February 2024, Cruz joined fellow China League One club Shanghai Jiading Huilong.

== Career statistics ==
As of match played 14 June 2025

Appearances and goals by club, season and competition
| Club | Season | League | | | State League | | Cup | | Continental | | Other | | Total | |
| Club | Season | Division | Apps | Goals | Apps | Goals | Apps | Goals | Apps | Goals | Apps | Goals | Apps | Goals |
|---|---|---|---|---|---|---|---|---|---|---|---|---|---|---|
| Brasil de Pelotas | 2009 | — | | | 14 | 3 | — | | — | | — | | 14 | 3 |
| Vasco da Gama | 2009 | Série B | 8 | 0 | — | | — | | — | | — | | 8 | 0 |
| Vasco da Gama | 2010 | Série A | 4 | 0 | 11 | 1 | 5 | 2 | — | | — | | 20 | 3 |
| Vasco da Gama | Total | | 12 | 0 | 11 | 1 | 5 | 2 | — | | — | | 28 | 3 |
| Bahia (loan) | 2011 | Série A | 3 | 0 | — | | — | | — | | — | | 3 | 0 |
| Bahia (loan) | 2012 | Série A | 2 | 0 | 16 | 3 | 4 | 0 | — | | — | | 22 | 3 |
| Bahia (loan) | Total | | 5 | 0 | 16 | 3 | 4 | 0 | — | | — | | 25 | 3 |
| Bahia | 2012 | Série A | 5 | 0 | — | | — | | — | | — | | 5 | 0 |
| Bahia | 2013 | Série A | — | | — | | — | | — | | 2 | 0 | 2 | 0 |
| Bahia | Total | | 5 | 0 | — | | — | | — | | 2 | 0 | 7 | 0 |
| Ceará (loan) | 2012 | Série B | 20 | 2 | — | | — | | — | | — | | 20 | 2 |
| Bragantino (loan) | 2013 | Série B | 28 | 2 | 10 | 0 | 2 | 0 | — | | — | | 40 | 2 |
| Bragantino | 2014 | Série B | 27 | 0 | 12 | 1 | 4 | 0 | — | | — | | 43 | 1 |
| ES Tunis | 2014–15 | Tunisian Ligue Professionnelle 1 | 10 | 1 | — | | 0 | 0 | 0 | 0 | — | | 10 | 1 |
| Cerezo Osaka | 2015 | J. League Division 2 | 8 | 1 | — | | 1 | 0 | — | | 0 | 0 | 9 | 1 |
| Atlético Goianiense | 2016 | Série B | 33 | 7 | 15 | 4 | 2 | 0 | — | | — | | 50 | 11 |
| Jeju United | 2017 | K League 1 | 32 | 13 | — | | 2 | 0 | 7 | 2 | — | | 41 | 15 |
| Jeju United | 2018 | K League 1 | 34 | 8 | — | | 2 | 0 | 6 | 2 | — | | 42 | 10 |
| Jeju United | 2019 | K League 1 | 36 | 8 | — | | 1 | 0 | — | | — | | 37 | 8 |
| Jeju United | Total | | 102 | 29 | — | | 5 | 0 | 13 | 4 | — | | 120 | 33 |
| Umm Salal | 2019–20 | Qatar Stars League | 1 | 0 | 0 | 0 | — | | — | | — | | 1 | 0 |
| CRB | 2020 | Série B | 13 | 0 | 4 | 0 | 3 | 0 | — | | 1 | 0 | 21 | 0 |
| Jiangxi Beidamen | 2021 | China League One | 1 | 0 | — | | — | | — | | — | | 1 | 0 |
| Jiangxi Beidamen | 2022 | China League One | 31 | 11 | — | | 1 | 0 | — | | — | | 32 | 11 |
| Jiangxi Beidamen | 2023 | China League One | 20 | 9 | — | | 1 | 0 | — | | — | | 21 | 9 |
| Jiangxi Beidamen | Total | | 52 | 20 | — | | 2 | 0 | — | | — | | 54 | 20 |
| Tianjin Jinmen Tiger (loan) | 2021 | Chinese Super League | 17 | 4 | — | | 1 | 0 | — | | — | | 18 | 4 |
| Shanghai Jiading Huilong | 2024 | China League One | 27 | 3 | — | | 0 | 0 | — | | — | | 27 | 3 |
| Shanghai Jiading Huilong | 2025 | China League One | 12 | 2 | — | | — | | — | | — | | 12 | 2 |
| Shanghai Jiading Huilong | Total | | 39 | 5 | — | | 0 | 0 | — | | — | | 39 | 5 |
| Career totals | | | 372 | 71 | 82 | 12 | 29 | 2 | 13 | 4 | 3 | 0 | 499 | 89 |
