= Moses Ogbu =

Nigerian footballer (born 1991)

Personal information
- Full name: Moses Owoicho Ogbu
- Date of birth: 7 February 1991 (age 35)
- Place of birth: Osogbo, Nigeria
- Position: Forward

Senior career*
Years	Team	Apps	(Gls)
2009	Gimo IF	11	(2)
2010–2015	IK Sirius	129	(40)
2016	Jönköpings Södra	12	(0)
2016	→ IK Sirius (loan)	14	(3)
2017–2018	IK Sirius	43	(13)
2019	Al-Ain	8	(3)
2019–2020	Grimsby Town	20	(2)
2020	Mjällby AIF	25	(14)
2021	Wuhan Three Towns	31	(18)
2022	Pohang Steelers	13	(1)
2022	Shaanxi Chang'an Athletic	13	(5)
2023	Shijiazhuang Gongfu	29	(20)
2024–2025	Nanjing City	49	(20)
- * Club domestic league appearances and goals as of 25 October 2025

Moses Owoicho Ogbu (born 7 February 1991) is a Nigerian footballer who plays as a forward.

Ogbu has spent the majority of his professional career playing in Sweden and has had spells with IK Sirius, Jönköpings Södra and Mjällby AIF. He has also played in England with Grimsby Town and in Saudi Arabia with Al-Ain, in South Korea with Pohang Steelers and in China for Wuhan Three Towns and Shaanxi Chang'an Athletic

== Career ==
Growing up in Nigeria, Ogbu arrived in Sweden in February 2009, when he joined for Djurgården 's Under-21 team on trial, with whom he played a few games, always at a youth level. During the same calendar year he also played in the fifth Swedish series with Gimo IF.

In October 2009 he joined IK Sirius on trial, a team that a few days later would be relegated to Division 1 but managing to secure a contract for the following season. During the 2013 season he was the top scorer in Division 1 with his 18 goals, as Sirius won be promotion to Superettan. At the end of the 2015 season, Sirius lost in the play-off's against Falkenbergs FF with Ogbu scored a brace in the 2-2 home match of the first leg.

Ogbu signed for Jönköpings Södra at the beginning of the 2016 season following the clubs promotion to the Allsvenskan. Ogbu made 12 appearances in the Swedish top flight without scoring.

In the summer transfer window he returned to the Sirius on loan, helping his team with three goals to find that promotion to Allsvenskan. Following the end of the loan, Ogbu remained with Sirius on a permanent deal following a mutual decision with Jönköpings to terminate his contract. In the 2018 season he scored with 7 goals in 28 games, but chose to renew his contract at the end of the year

On 3 February 2019, Ogbu signed a half-year contract with Saudi Arabian Second Division club Al-Ain.

On 25 June 2019, Ogbu signed for EFL League Two side Grimsby Town on a one-year deal. On 14 January 2020, Ogbu was released from his contract at Grimsby, with manager Ian Holloway stating "I believe that he needs to go back to where he came from and see if he can be happy again. The boy took it brilliantly. He admitted that he hasn't seen his family in Nigeria for over a year, so we had a big hug at the end of it and I told the lads that." Ogbu had scored four goals in twenty-five appearances for The Mariners in all competitions

Ogbu returned to Sweden on 9 March 2020 signing with Mjällby AIF. During the spell he was the third top scorer in the League with 14 goals in 25 appearances as his side finished 5th in Sweden's top flight.

On February 26, 2021 Ogbu signed with China League One side Wuhan Three Towns.

On 15 February 2022, Ogbu signed with K League 1 side Pohang Steelers.

On September 1, 2022, he joined Shaanxi Chang'an Athletic of China League One. The club was dissolved in March 2023.

On 7 April 2023, Ogbu signed with China League One side Shijiazhuang Gongfu, where he finished the 2023 season as the league’s top scorer with 20 goals.

On 7 February 2024, Ogbu joined fellow China League One club Nanjing City.

== Personal life ==
Ogbu holds dual-nationality and has both Nigerian and Swedish passports.

== Career statistics ==
As of match played 25 October 2025.

Appearances and goals by club, season and competition
Club	Season	League			National Cup		League Cup		Continental		Other		Total	
Club	Season	Division	Apps	Goals	Apps	Goals	Apps	Goals	Apps	Goals	Apps	Goals	Apps	Goals
IK Sirius	2010	Division 1	8	1	1	0	—		—		—		9	1
IK Sirius	2011	Division 1	18	1	2	0	—		—		—		20	1
IK Sirius	2012	Division 1	21	7	1	0	—		—		—		22	7
IK Sirius	2013	Division 1	25	18	5	0	—		—		—		30	18
IK Sirius	2014	Superettan	28	8	6	3	—		—		—		34	11
IK Sirius	2015	Superettan	29	5	4	1	—		—		2	2	35	8
IK Sirius	Total		129	40	19	4	—		—		2	2	150	46
Jönköpings Södra	2016	Allsvenskan	12	0	3	0	—		—		—		15	0
IK Sirius (loan)	2016	Superettan	14	3	1	0	—		—		—		15	3
IK Sirius	2017	Allsvenskan	15	6	0	0	—		—		—		15	6
IK Sirius	2018	Allsvenskan	28	7	3	1	—		—		—		31	8
IK Sirius	Total		43	13	3	1	—		—		—		46	14
Al-Ain	2018–19	First Division League	8	3	0	0	—		—		—		8	3
Grimsby Town	2019–20	League Two	20	2	0	0	3	0	—		—		23	2
Mjällby AIF	2020	Allsvenskan	25	14	2	0	—		—		—		27	14
Wuhan Three Towns	2021	China League One	31	18	0	0	—		—		—		31	18
Pohang Steelers	2022	K League 1	13	1	2	0	—		—		—		15	1
Shaanxi Chang'an Athletic	2022	China League One	13	5	0	0	—		—		—		13	5
Shijiazhuang Gongfu	2023	China League One	29	20	0	0	—		—		—		29	20
Nanjing City	2024	China League One	25	9	3	3	—		—		—		28	12
Nanjing City	2025	China League One	24	11	0	0	—		—		—		24	11
Nanjing City	Total		49	20	3	3	—		—		—		52	23
Career total			387	139	33	8	3	0	0	0	2	2	425	149
