= Zhixuan =

Zhixuan may be a transliteration of multiple Chinese names (知玄, 志玄, 智轩, 志轩, 之玄, 志玄). Notable people with the name include:

- Du Zhixuan
- Duan Zhixuan
- Li Zhixuan
- Lin Zhixuan
- Liu Zhixuan
- Wang Zhixuan
- Joseph Xu Zhixuan
