= Kobena Amed =

Ivorian footballer

Personal information
- Date of birth: 10 November 1997 (age 29)
- Place of birth: Treichville, Abidjan, Ivory Coast
- Height: 1.84 m (6 ft 0 in)
- Position: Forward

Team information
- Current team: Kokand 1912
- Number: 71

Youth career
- –2016: L'Espoir de Koumassi

Senior career*
Years	Team	Apps	(Gls)
2016–2017	Shenzhen Baoxin	20	(3)
2018–2019	Xinjiang Tianshan Leopard	12	(0)
2020–2022	Al-Taliya	35	(10)
2023	Dandong Tengyue	6	(0)
2025–	Kokand 1912	1	(0)
- * Club domestic league appearances and goals as of 12 April 2025

Kobena Amed (born 10 November 1997) is an Ivorian footballer who currently plays for Uzbekistan Super League club Kokand 1912 ·.

== Career statistics ==
=== Club ===
As of 13 September 2023.

Club	Season	League			Cup		Other		Total	
Club	Season	Division	Apps	Goals	Apps	Goals	Apps	Goals	Apps	Goals
Xinjiang Tianshan Leopard	2018	China League One	12	0	0	0	—		12	0
Dandong Tengyue	2023	China League One	6	0	0	0	—		6	0
Career total			18	0	0	0	0	0	18	0
