= Jefferson (footballer, born November 1989) =

Brazilian association football player

Personal information
- Full name: Jefferson Tavares da Silva
- Date of birth: 22 November 1989 (age 36)
- Place of birth: Rio de Janeiro, Brazil
- Height: 1.88 m (6 ft 2 in)
- Position: Forward

Team information
- Current team: Maricá FC
- Number: 9

Senior career*
Years	Team	Apps	(Gls)
–2012	Bonsucesso		
2012–2014	Madureira	20	(1)
2014	CRAC	15	(1)
2014–2015	Tocantins		
2015–2016	Club Destroyers		
2016–2017	Real América		
2018–2019	Club Destroyers	37	(18)
2019	Mouloudia	8	(1)
2019	Gol Gohar	6	(0)
2020	Atlético Palmaflor	25	(14)
2021	Royal Pari	27	(15)
2022	Blooming	38	(10)
2023	Nanjing City	11	(3)
2023	→ Shanghai Jiading Huilong (loan)	18	(4)
2024	Wilstermann	20	(3)
2025–	Maricá FC	2	(0)
- * Club domestic league appearances and goals as of 27 September 2024

Jefferson Tavares da Silva (born 22 November 1989), is a Brazilian footballer who plays as a centre forward.

== Club career ==
=== Gol Gohar ===
He made his debut for Gol Gohar Sirjan in 2nd fixtures of 2019–20 Iran Pro League against Saipa while he substituted in for Kevin Jansen.

=== Nanjing City ===
On 7 April 2023, Jefferson joined China League One side Nanjing City.

On 1 July 2023, Jefferson joined fellow China League One club Shanghai Jiading Huilong on loan.

=== Wilstermann ===
On 3 January 2024, Jefferson joined Bolivian Primera División club Wilstermann.
