= Valdu Té =

Bissau-Guinean footballer

Personal information
- Full name: Valdumar Augusto Té
- Date of birth: 14 August 1997 (age 29)
- Place of birth: Bissau, Guinea-Bissau
- Height: 1.88 m (6 ft 2 in)
- Position: Forward

Team information
- Current team: Alcochetense
- Number: 45

Youth career
- Sporting de Bissau
- 2014–2016: Vitória Setúbal

Senior career*
Years	Team	Apps	(Gls)
2018–2021	Vitória Setúbal	8	(0)
2016–2017	→ Mafra (loan)	8	(1)
2017–2018	→ Montijo (loan)	22	(5)
2019–2020	→ Arouca (loan)	18	(1)
2020–2021	Amora	9	(0)
2021–2022	Imabari	16	(4)
2022	Qingdao West Coast	27	(10)
2023	Yanbian Longding	25	(3)
2024	Kelantan Darul Naim	9	(0)
2024–2025	Al Tahaddy SC	8	(1)
2025–2026	Sintrense	15	(7)
2026	Dobrudzha	14	(1)
2026	Alcochetense	2	(1)
- * Club domestic league appearances and goals as of 22 October 2026

Valdumar Augusto Té (born 14 August 1997) is a Bissau-Guinean professional footballer who plays as a forward for Alcochetense.

== Career ==
On 22 September 2018, Té made his professional debut with Vitória Setúbal in a 2018–19 Primeira Liga match against FC Porto.

On 15 April 2023, Té signed with China League One side Yanbian Longding.

== Career statistics ==
As of 10 August 2024

Appearances and goals by club, season and competition
Club	Season	League			National cup		League cup		Continental		Other		Total	
Club	Season	Division	Apps	Goals	Apps	Goals	Apps	Goals	Apps	Goals	Apps	Goals	Apps	Goals
Imabari	2021	J3 League	16	4	1	1	—		—		—		17	5
Qingdao West Coast	2022	China League One	27	10	1	0	—		—		—		28	10
Yanbian Longding	2023	China League One	25	3	1	0	—		—		—		26	3
Kelantan Darul Naim	2024–25	Malaysia Super League	8	0	1	0	—		—		—		9	0
Career total			76	17	4	1	0	0	0	0	0	0	80	18
