= Kingsley Onuegbu =

Nigerian footballer

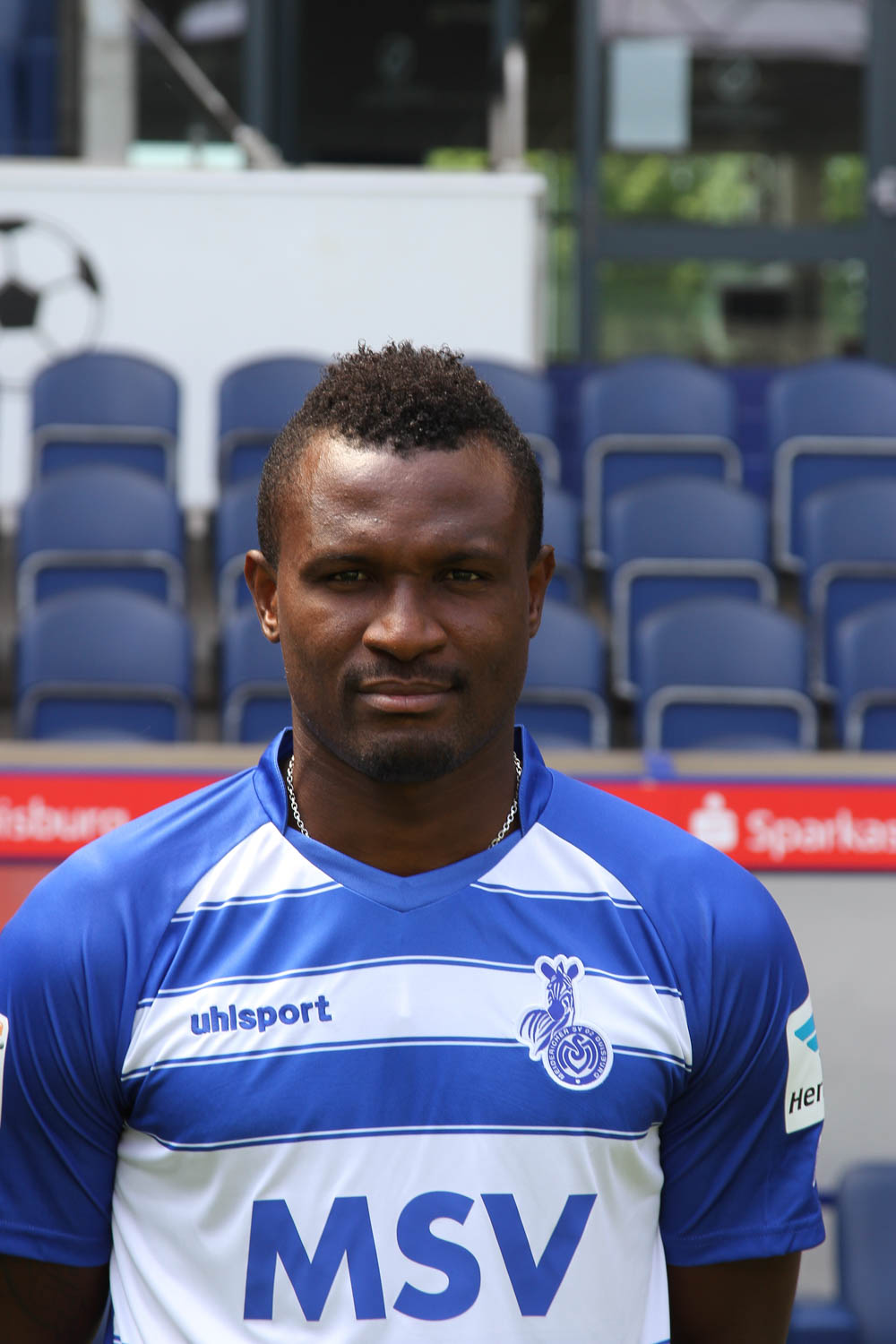
- Onuegbu with MSV Duisburg in 2015

Personal information
- Date of birth: 5 March 1986 (age 40)
- Place of birth: Kaduna, Nigeria
- Height: 1.91 m (6 ft 3 in)
- Position: Striker

Youth career
- 2005–2007: SC Idar-Oberstein

Senior career*
Years	Team	Apps	(Gls)
2007–2008	SC Idar-Oberstein	26	(12)
2008–2010	Eintracht Braunschweig	61	(17)
2010–2013	Greuther Fürth	21	(6)
2011–2013	→ Greuther Fürth II	18	(5)
2012	→ SV Sandhausen (loan)	13	(1)
2013–2018	MSV Duisburg	163	(45)
2018–2020	Nea Salamis Famagusta	55	(25)
2020–2021	Shaanxi Chang'an Athletics	35	(20)
2020	→ Xinjiang Tianshan Leopard (loan)	7	(4)
2022	Qingdao Hainiu	32	(27)
2023	Dongguan United	28	(10)
2024	Nanjing City	13	(1)
- * Club domestic league appearances and goals as of 09:22, 22 March 2023 (UTC)

Kingsley Onuegbu (born 5 March 1986) is a Nigerian professional footballer who plays as a striker.

== Career ==
Onuegbu played street football in Nigeria, before his football career began in Germany in the summer of 2005 with SC Idar-Oberstein. In his first professional season for Idar-Oberstein in 2007–08, Onuegbu scored twelve goals in 26 games. In the summer of 2008 he joined Eintracht Braunschweig. On 11 May 2010, he left Braunschweig to sign with SpVgg Greuther Fürth. He signed with MSV Duisburg in 2013. On 9 May 2018, it was announced that he will leave Duisburg at the end of the 2017–18 season.

For the 2018–19 season, he joined Cypriot club Nea Salamis Famagusta.

On 30 August 2020, Onuegbu signed with Chinese club Shaanxi Chang'an Athletics. On 23 October 2020, Onuegbu joined fellow China League One club Xinjiang Tianshan Leopard on loan.

On 3 May 2022, Onuegbu joined fellow China League One club Qingdao Hainiu, where he finished the 2022 season as the league’s top scorer with 27 goals.

In April 2023, Onuegbu joined fellow China League One club Dongguan United.

On 7 February 2024, Onuegbu joined fellow China League One club Nanjing City.

== Personal life ==
He was born as Kingsley Ugochuwu and moved when he was twenty years with his father from Lagos, Nigeria to Paris, France.

== Career statistics ==
As of 6 April 2024

Appearances and goals by club, season and competition
Club	Season	League			National Cup		Continental		Other		Total	
Club	Season	Division	Apps	Goals	Apps	Goals	Apps	Goals	Apps	Goals	Apps	Goals
SC Idar-Oberstein	2006–07	Oberliga	26	12	—		—		—		26	12
Eintracht Braunschweig	2008–09	3. Liga	29	7	0	0	—		—		29	7
Eintracht Braunschweig	2009–10	3. Liga	29	10	1	0	—		—		30	10
Eintracht Braunschweig	Total		58	17	1	0	—		—		59	17
Greuther Fürth	2010–11	2. Bundesliga	20	6	2	1	—		—		22	7
Greuther Fürth	2011–12	2. Bundesliga	1	0	0	0	—		—		1	0
Greuther Fürth	2012–13	2. Bundesliga	0	0	1	0	—		—		1	0
Greuther Fürth	Total		21	6	3	1	—		—		24	7
Greuther Fürth II	2011–12	Regionalliga	4	0	—		—		—		4	0
Greuther Fürth II	2012–13	Regionalliga	14	5	—		—		—		14	5
Greuther Fürth II	Total		18	5	—		—		—		18	5
SV Sandhausen (loan)	2012–13	2. Bundesliga	13	1	1	0	—		—		14	1
MSV Duisburg	2013–14	3. Liga	37	14	1	0	—		—		38	14
MSV Duisburg	2014–15	3. Liga	34	14	2	0	—		—		36	14
MSV Duisburg	2015–16	2. Bundesliga	30	4	0	0	—		2	0	32	4
MSV Duisburg	2016–17	3. Liga	33	11	1	0	—		—		34	11
MSV Duisburg	2017–18	2. Bundesliga	29	2	1	0	—		—		30	2
MSV Duisburg	Total		163	45	5	0	—		2	0	170	45
Nea Salamis Famagusta	2018–19	Cypriot First Division	32	11	1	1	—		—		33	12
Nea Salamis Famagusta	2019–20	Cypriot First Division	23	14	3	0	—		—		26	14
Nea Salamis Famagusta	Total		55	25	4	1	—		—		59	26
Shaanxi Chang'an Athletic	2020	China League One	2	0	—		—		—		13	0
Shaanxi Chang'an Athletic	2021	China League One	33	20	2	1	—		—		35	21
Shaanxi Chang'an Athletic	Total		35	20	2	1	—		—		37	21
Xinjiang Tianshan Leopard (loan)	2020	China League One	5	2	—		—		2	2	7	4
Qingdao Hainiu	2022	China League One	32	27	0	0	—		—		32	27
Dongguan United	2023	China League One	28	10	0	0	—		—		28	10
Nanjing City	2024	China League One	13	1	0	0	—		—		13	1
Career total			447	171	16	3	0	0	4	2	467	173
