= Liu Baiyang =

Chinese footballer (born 2003)

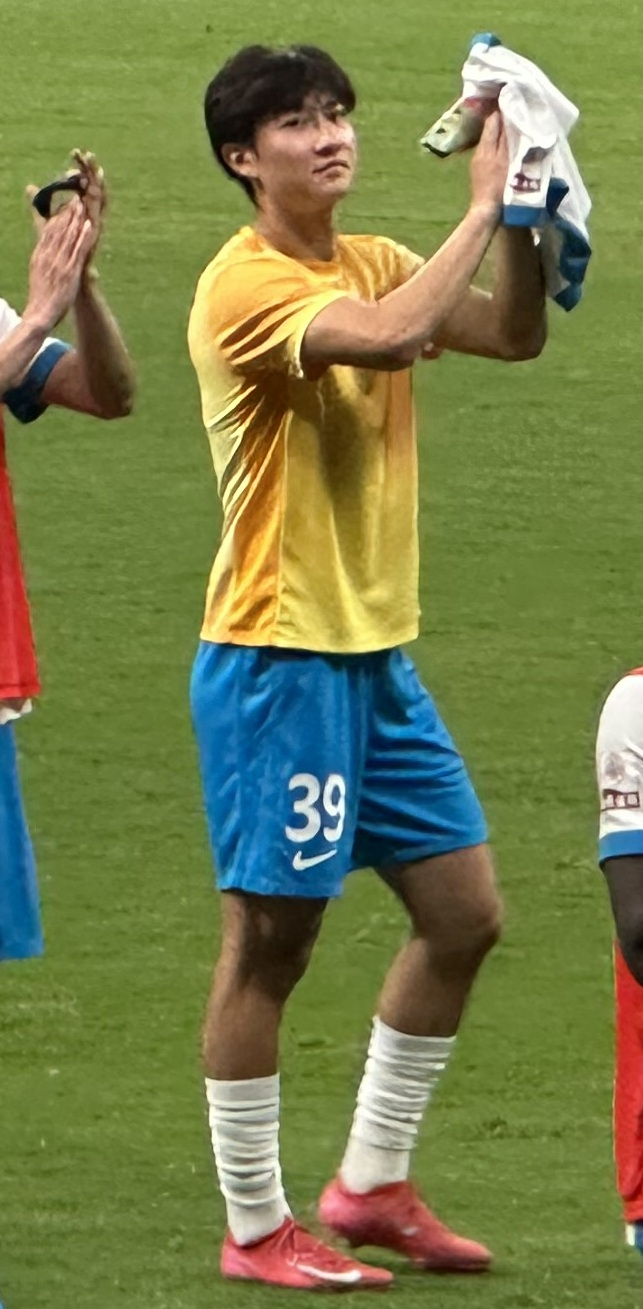
- Liu Baiyang in June 2025

Personal information
- Full name: Liu Baiyang
- Date of birth: 6 April 2003 (age 23)
- Place of birth: Luoyang, Henan, China
- Height: 1.86 m (6 ft 1 in)
- Position: Winger

Team information
- Current team: Shijiazhuang Gongfu (on loan from Shanghai Port)
- Number: 39

Youth career
- 2012–2022: Shanghai Port

Senior career*
Years	Team	Apps	(Gls)
2022–2024	Shanghai Port	8	(2)
2023	→ Guangxi Pingguo Haliao (loan)	28	(6)
2024–	→ Shanghai Port B (res.)	23	(5)
2025	→ Qingdao West Coast (loan)	6	(0)
2026–	→ Shijiazhuang Gongfu (loan)	0	(0)
- * Club domestic league appearances and goals as of 8 March 2026

Liu Baiyang (simplified Chinese: 刘柏杨; traditional Chinese: 劉柏楊; pinyin: Liú Bǎiyáng; born 6 April 2003) is a Chinese professional footballer who plays as a winger for China League One club Shijiazhuang Gongfu, on loan from Chinese Super League club Shanghai Port B.

== Club career ==
In 2012, Liu Baiyang was purchased by the youth academy of Shanghai East Asia, as part of a deal between youth academies in Shanghai and youth players from Luoyang, Henan, when Liu was nine years of age. His future teammate Jia Boyan was also included in the deal. During his time at the youth levels, he briefly trained with the academy of English side Wolverhampton Wanderers in England.

Before the 2022 season, Liu Baiyang was promoted to the Shanghai Port first-team. On 4 June 2022, Liu made his professional debut for the club in a 1–0 defeat to Wuhan Yangtze River, replacing Liu Zhurun as an 85th-minute substitute in the league opener. His first start for Shanghai Port came in the next match on 8 June, playing 58 minutes of a 2–0 Shanghai derby loss to Shanghai Shenhua. On 24 October 2022, after coming on as a 78th-minute substitute for Paulinho, Liu scored his first two career goals in the span of four minutes in a 7–0 victory over Meizhou Hakka. With the goals, he became the youngest ever Chinese Super League goalscorer for Shanghai Port, at 19 years and 201 days. He also became the youngest ever player to score a double in the Chinese Super League.

On 17 April 2023, Liu joined China League One side Guangxi Pingguo Haliao on a one-year loan. On 22 April, he made his Guangxi Pingguo Haliao debut and scored his first two goals at home in a 3–0 victory against Jinan Xingzhou in the league opener. With his performance, he was named China League One's Player of the Round. He scored his third goal for the club on 6 May 2023, opening the scoreline against Dandong Tengyue in a 1–1 away draw. After scoring two more goals in May against Liaoning Shenyang Urban, Liu received the league's Player of the Month award for the months of April and May. He only scored one more goal for the rest of the season, coming from an away equaliser of a 1–1 draw at Sichuan Jiuniu on 17 June. At the end of the 2023 China League One season, he was a candidate for the league's Player of the Year.

In 2024, he was registered by Shanghai Port to be in their B team, playing as a newly promoted team in China League Two. On 5 April 2024, he scored his first goal for Shanghai Port B in a 2–0 home win over Shenzhen Juniors. On 11 April 2024, Liu struck the head of an opposition player in Shanghai Port B's 1–0 away win against Guangxi Lanhang, and was fined ¥20,000 and suspended for the following four matches. At the end of the 2024 China League Two campaign, Liu scored five goals in 23 total appearances.

On 18 February 2025, Liu was loaned to Chinese Super League side Qingdao West Coast on a one-year deal. He was given the number 39 shirt. On 3 March, he made his first appearance for Qingdao West Coast in a 2–0 victory against Wuhan Three Towns, coming on as a substitute for Nelson da Luz.

== International career ==
Between September 2021 and March 2022, Liu Baiyang was selected as part of three training camps of the China U20.

== Career statistics ==
=== Club ===
As of 17 October 2025

Appearances and goals by club, season, and competition
Club	Season	League			Cup		Continental		Other		Total	
Club	Season	Division	Apps	Goals	Apps	Goals	Apps	Goals	Apps	Goals	Apps	Goals
Shanghai Port	2022	Chinese Super League	8	2	0	0	–		–		8	2
Shanghai Port	2025	Chinese Super League	0	0	0	0	0 (Note: Appearances in AFC Champions League Elite)	0	0 (Note: Appearances in Chinese FA Super Cup)	0	0	0
Shanghai Port	Total		8	2	0	0	0	0	0	0	8	2
Guangxi Pingguo Haliao (loan)	2023	China League One	28	6	0	0	–		–		28	6
Shanghai Port B (res.)	2024	China League Two	23	5	–		–		–		23	5
Qingdao West Coast (loan)	2025	Chinese Super League	6	0	2	0	–		–		8	0
Career total			65	13	2	0	0	0	0	0	67	13
