= Chris Shimbayev =

Nigerian footballer

Personal information
- Full name: Chris Tavershima Shimbayev
- Date of birth: 28 December 2001 (age 24)
- Height: 1.80 m (5 ft 11 in)
- Position: Forward

Youth career
- –2020: Galaxy Sports Academy

Senior career*
Years	Team	Apps	(Gls)
2020–2021	Suzhou Dongwu	9	(1)
2022	Nanjing City	0	(0)
2023	Liaoning Shenyang Urban	6	(0)
- * Club domestic league appearances and goals as of 17:17, 27 August 2021 (UTC)

Chris Tavershima Shimbayev (born 28 December 2001) is a Nigerian footballer.

== Career statistics ==
=== Club ===
As of 3 June 2023.

Club	Season	League			Cup		Other		Total	
Club	Season	Division	Apps	Goals	Apps	Goals	Apps	Goals	Apps	Goals
Suzhou Dongwu	2020	China League One	9	1	1 (Note: Appearances in the Chinese FA Cup)	0	0	0	10	1
Nanjing City	2022	China League One	0	0	0	0	—		0	0
Liaoning Shenyang Urban	2023	China League One	6	0	0	0	—		6	0
Career total			15	1	1	0	0	0	16	1
