= Du Zhixuan =

Chinese footballer

Personal information
- Date of birth: 15 October 2001 (age 25)
- Place of birth: Anyang, Henan, China
- Height: 1.88 m (6 ft 2 in)
- Position: Midfielder

Team information
- Current team: Shijiazhuang Gongfu
- Number: 18

Youth career
- –2021: Henan Songshan Longmen

Senior career*
Years	Team	Apps	(Gls)
2021–2025	Henan FC	11	(0)
2025	→ Shijiazhuang Gongfu	10	(0)
2026–	Shijiazhuang Gongfu	0	(0)
- * Club domestic league appearances and goals as of 00:01, 31 December 2022 (UTC)

Du Zhixuan (Chinese: 杜智轩; born 15 October 2001) is a Chinese footballer currently playing as a midfielder for Shijiazhuang Gongfu.

== Club career ==
Du Zhixuan was promoted to the senior team of Henan Songshan Longmen (later simply renamed as Henan FC) within the 2021 Chinese Super League season and would make his debut in a league game on 3 January 2022 against Shanghai Shenhua in a 3-0 defeat where he came on as a substitute for Gu Cao.

== Career statistics ==
As of 31 December 2022.

Club	Season	League			Cup		Continental		Other		Total	
Club	Season	Division	Apps	Goals	Apps	Goals	Apps	Goals	Apps	Goals	Apps	Goals
Henan Songshan Longmen/ Henan FC	2021	Chinese Super League	1	0	0	0	–		–		1	0
Henan Songshan Longmen/ Henan FC	2022	Chinese Super League	3	0	1	0	–		–		4	0
Henan Songshan Longmen/ Henan FC	Total		4	0	1	0	0	0	0	0	5	0
Career total			4	0	1	0	0	0	0	0	5	0
