= Salva Suay =

Spanish football coach

Personal information
- Full name: Salvador Suay Sánchez
- Date of birth: 28 September 1979 (age 47)
- Place of birth: Valencia, Spain

Managerial career
- Years: Team
- 2000–2004: Levante (youth)
- 2004–2006: Villarreal (youth)
- 2006–2009: Atlético Madrid (youth)
- 2014: América de Cali (interim)
- 2018–2021: Guangzhou FC youth
- 2021–2022: Wuhan Three Towns B
- 2022–2023: Guangzhou FC youth
- 2023–2024: Guangzhou FC
- 2024-2025: Chongqing Tonglianglong

Salvador "Salva" Suay Sánchez (born 28 September 1979) is a Spanish football manager.

== Career ==
Born in Valencia, Suay began his career with hometown side Levante UD in 2000, as manager of their youth sides. He moved to Villarreal CF in 2004, again to take over the youth sides while also working as an analyst for the first team, before joining Atlético Madrid in 2006.

In 2009, Suay returned to his native region to work as general manager of CF Torre Levante. On 5 December 2013, he moved abroad and joined Colombian side América de Cali as their sporting director.

On 22 October 2014, Suay was named interim manager of América, replacing Jhon Jairo López. In June 2015, he moved to Envigado as their sporting director, while also working as an assistant to manager Juan Carlos Sánchez.

In March 2018, Suay moved to China to become manager of the under-21 team of Guangzhou Evergrande. He left the club in 2021 to work in the B-team of Wuhan Three Towns, before returning to his previous role in the following year.

In June 2023, Suay was named first team manager of Guangzhou FC.

On 27 December 2024, Suay was named the head coach of Chongqing Tonglianglong, and he left the club on 23 September 2025.
