= Uroš Tomović =

Serbian association football player

Personal information
- Date of birth: 3 April 1994 (age 32)
- Place of birth: Belgrade, FR Yugoslavia
- Height: 1.90 m (6 ft 3 in)
- Position: Forward

Team information
- Current team: Liaoning Shenyang Urban

Youth career
- Rad

Senior career*
Years	Team	Apps	(Gls)
2013–2014	Rad	0	(0)
2013	→ Srem Jakovo (loan)	14	(1)
2014	→ Žarkovo (loan)	13	(2)
2014	Rakovica	7	(2)
2015	Brodarac 1947	4	(0)
2016	IMT	2	(0)
2016–2017	Žarkovo	12	(0)
2017–2018	BASK	21	(11)
2018–2019	Radnički Pirot	0	(0)
2019–2020	Sinđelić Beograd	13	(3)
2020	Senglea Athletic		
2020	Radnički Sremska Mitrovica	7	(1)
2021	Radnički Beograd		
2021	Xinjiang Tianshan Leopard	11	(0)
2022–2023	Liaoning Shenyang Urban	10	(1)
2024	Torlak		
- * Club domestic league appearances and goals as of 14:01, 28 April 2022 (UTC)

Uroš Tomović (Serbian Cyrillic: Урош Томовић, born 3 April 1994) is a Serbian footballer who plays as a forward.

In summer 2020, Tomović moved abroad to play for Maltese outfit Senglea Athletic.

== Career statistics ==
As of 17 August 2021

Club	Season	League			Cup		Other		Total	
Club	Season	Division	Apps	Goals	Apps	Goals	Apps	Goals	Apps	Goals
Radnički Pirot	2018–19	Serbian First League	0	0	1 (Note: Appearances in the Serbian Cup)	0	0	0	1	0
Sinđelić Beograd	2019–20	Serbian First League	13	3	1	0	0	0	14	3
Radnički Sremska Mitrovica	2020–21	Serbian First League	7	1	0	0	0	0	7	1
Xinjiang Tianshan Leopard	2021	China League One	0	0	0	0	0	0	0	0
Career total			20	4	2	0	0	0	22	4
