= Óscar Céspedes =

Spanish football manager

Personal information
- Full name: Óscar Céspedes Cabeza
- Date of birth: 6 February 1978 (age 48)
- Place of birth: Santa Coloma, Barcelona, Spain
- Height: 1.70 m (5 ft 7 in)
- Position: Midfielder

Youth career
- –1995: Barcelona
- 1995–1997: Espanyol

Senior career*
Years	Team	Apps	(Gls)
1997–1998	Espanyol B		
1998–1999	Algeciras	26	(1)
1999–2000	Motril	23	(0)
2001–2002	Girona		
2002	Rayo Vallecano B		
2003	Sant Andreu		
2003–2004	Palamós	35	(1)
2004–2006	Sant Andreu		
2006–2007	Figueres		
2007–2008	Castelldefels	33	(1)
2008–2009	Terrassa	25	(1)
2009–2010	Gavà	33	(2)
2010	Racing de Ferrol		
2010	Gramenet	15	(0)
2011–2012	Racing de Ferrol		
2012–2013	Terrassa	2	(0)
2014–2015	Martinenc	24	(1)

Managerial career
- 2019: Qingdao Huanghai (interim)
- 2020: Qingdao Huanghai (interim)
- 2021: Shaanxi Chang'an Athletic
- 2022: Guangxi Pingguo Haliao
- 2022–2023: Nanjing City
- 2023–2024: Shaanxi Union
- 2025: Dalian K'un City
- 2025–2026: Guizhou Guiyang Athletic
- * Club domestic league appearances and goals

Óscar Céspedes Cabeza (born 6 February 1978) is a Spanish football coach and former footballer.

== Club career ==
Céspedes started his career with Spanish giants Barcelona, though he never made an appearance for the club. He went on to forge a career in the Spanish third and fourth tiers.

== Managerial career ==
In 2025, Céspedes announce official appointment manager of China League One promoted club, Dalian K'un City for 2025 season.

On 18 October 2026, Guizhou Guiyang Athletic has announced Céspedes's departure.

== Career statistics ==
=== Club ===
Appearances and goals by club, season and competition
Club	Season	League			Cup		Other		Total	
Club	Season	Division	Apps	Goals	Apps	Goals	Apps	Goals	Apps	Goals
Algeciras	1998–99	Segunda División B	26	1	0	0	3 (Note: Appearances in the 1998–99 Segunda División B playout)	0	29	1
Motril	1999–00	Segunda División B	23	0	0	0	0	0	23	0
Palamós	2003–04	Segunda División B	35	1	0	0	0	0	35	1
Sant Andreu	2005–06	Segunda División B	27	0	0	0	0	0	27	0
Figueres	2006–07	Segunda División B	27	0	0	0	0	0	27	0
Castelldefels	2007–08	Segunda División B	33	1	0	0	0	0	33	1
Terrassa	2008–09	Segunda División B	25	1	0	0	0	0	25	1
Gavà	2009–10	Segunda División B	33	2	0	0	0	0	33	2
Gramenet	2010–11	Segunda División B	15	0	0	0	0	0	15	0
Terrassa	2012–13	Tercera División	2	0	0	0	0	0	2	0
Martinenc	2014–15	Tercera División	24	1	0	0	0	0	24	1
Career total			3	0	0	0	0	0	3	0

== Managerial statistics ==
As of the start for 2025 season.

Managerial record by team and tenure
Team	From	To	Record				
Team	From	To	P	W	D	L	Win %
Shaanxi Chang'an Athletic	2021	2021	27	12	9	6	44.4
Guangxi Pingguo Haliao	2022	2022	10	2	4	4	20.0
Nanjing City	2022	2023	17	7	5	5	41.2
Shaanxi Union	2023	2024	24	13	4	7	54.2
Dalian K'un City	2025	present	4	1	2	1	25.0
Total			66	28	20	18	42.4
