= Ruichang Sports Park Stadium =

Sports venue in Ruichang, China

- 瑞昌市体育公园体育场
- Interactive map of Ruichang Sports Park Stadium
- Location: Ruichang, Jiangxi, China
- Coordinates: 29°39′22″N 115°37′51″E
- Capacity: 13,188

Construction
- Opened: 2013

Tenant
- Jiangxi Lushan (2017–)

The Ruichang Sports Park Stadium is a multi-purpose stadium located in Ruichang, Jiangxi, China, part of the greater Ruichang Sports Park sports complex, and is the home of Jiangxi Lushan. The sports complex comprises three main components: a stadium, a gymnasium, and outdoor sports facilities.
