= Ningbo Professional F.C. =

Chinese football club

- Full name: Ningbo Professional Football Club 宁波职业足球俱乐部
- Founded: 2009; 17 years ago
- Ground: Ningbo Sports Development Centre Stadium
- Capacity: 30,000
- Owner: Lu Jianjun
- Manager: Sergio Zarco Díaz
- League: China League One
- 2026: China League One, 10th of 16
Home colours	Away colours

Ningbo Professional Football Club (Chinese: 宁波职业足球俱乐部; pinyin: Níngbō Zhíyè Zúqiú Jùlèbù) is a Chinese professional football club based in Ningbo, Zhejiang, that competes in China League One, the second tier of Chinese football. Ningbo plays its home matches at the Ningbo Cixi Stadium, located within Cixi. Founded in 2009 in the city of Shanghai, Shanghai Jiading Huilong moved to Ningbo in December 2025.

== History ==
The club was founded in 2009 as Shanghai Boji F.C. In 2013, they changed their name to Shanghai Jiading Boo King. In 2015 the club qualified for the first round of the Chinese FA Cup, losing on penalties to Qingdao Kunpeng after a 0–0 draw.

In 2017, they changed their English name to Shanghai Jiading Boji. In the 2019 Chinese FA Cup, the team entered the fifth round by overpowering professional clubs Yanbian Beiguo, Zhejiang Yiteng and Beijing BSU, becoming the only amateur club left in the cup. Also in the same year, they finished 5th in the 2019 Chinese Champions League and gained promotion to China League Two for the first time in club history after beating Xi'an Daxing Chongde in the promotion/relegation play-offs.

In January 2021, they changed their name to Shanghai Jiading Huilong. After finishing 7th in the promotion group and missing promotion to China League One, they were admitted into the 2022 China League One after the last-minute withdrawal of Chongqing Liangjiang Athletic from Chinese Super League.

== Name history ==
- 2009–2012 Shanghai Boji F.C. 上海博击
- 2013–2017 Shanghai Jiading Boo King F.C. 上海嘉定博击
- 2017–2020 Shanghai Jiading Boji F.C. 上海嘉定博击
- 2021–2025 Shanghai Jiading Huilong F.C. 上海嘉定汇龙
- 2026– Ningbo Professional F.C. 宁波FC

== Players ==
=== Current squad ===
As of July 2026

Note: Flags indicate national team as defined under FIFA eligibility rules; some limited exceptions apply. Players may hold more than one non-FIFA nationality.

No.	Pos.	Nation	Player
1	GK	CHN	Lin Xiang
2	DF	CHN	Shang Kefeng
4	DF	CHN	Zou Yourong
5	DF	CHN	Yao Diran
7	MF	CHN	Pang Kaiyuan (on loan from Shanghai Shenhua)
8	MF	BRA	Léo Cittadini
9	FW	CHN	Men Yang
10	FW	BRA	Leonardo
11	MF	CHN	Liu Yue
12	GK	CHN	Xia Yupeng
16	MF	CHN	Chen Ao
17	MF	CHN	Zhou Junchen
18	MF	CHN	Lin Chaocan
19	MF	CHN	Gao Haisheng
20	DF	CHN	Qi Xinlei
21	FW	CHN	Lin Wenkai

No.	Pos.	Nation	Player
22	GK	CHN	Wang Qinghua
23	DF	CHN	Bai Jiajun
24	MF	CHN	Shui Miao
25	MF	CHN	Qu Geping (on loan from Dalian Yingbo)
26	DF	CHN	Su Shihao
28	MF	CHN	Zhang Lingfeng
29	MF	CHN	Zhou Yangjie
30	DF	CHN	Liu Yang
34	DF	CHN	Li Zifan
35	DF	CHN	Xu Yougang
36	MF	CHN	Zhou Junhao
38	GK	CHN	Chen Xing
42	MF	CHN	Yao Junyu
45	MF	SRB	Stefan Tomović

=== Out on loan ===
Note: Flags indicate national team as defined under FIFA eligibility rules; some limited exceptions apply. Players may hold more than one non-FIFA nationality.

No.	Pos.	Nation	Player
—	MF	CHN	Li Xinan (at (China) Guizhou Zhucheng Athletic until 31 December 2026)
—	FW	CHN	Qu Yanheng (at (China) Yanbian Longding until 31 December 2026)
—	DF	CHN	Gao Le (at (China) Wenzhou FC until 31 December 2026)
—	MF	CHN	Yu Haozhen (at (China) Ganzhou Ruishi until 31 December 2026)

No.	Pos.	Nation	Player
—	MF	CHN	Gong Chunjie (at (China) Shanghai Second until 31 December 2026)
—	DF	CHN	Eddy Francis (at (China) Shanghai Second until 31 December 2026)
—	FW	CHN	Long Junyuan (at (China) Guangdong Mingtu until 31 December 2026)
—	FW	TPE	Chen Hao-wei (at (China) Shijiazhuang Gongfu until 31 December 2026)
—	DF	CHN	Liu Boyang (at (China) Wuxi Wugo until 31 December 2026)
