= Shijiazhuang Gongfu F.C. =

Chinese football club

Shijiazhuang Gongfu 石家庄功夫
- Full name: Shijiazhuang Gongfu Football Club 石家庄功夫足球俱乐部
- Founded: 2020; 6 years ago
- Ground: Yutong International Sports Center
- Capacity: 29,000
- Chairman: Zhai Zhihai
- Manager: Jesús Tato
- League: China League One
- 2025: China League One, 5th of 16
Home colours	Away colours

Shijiazhuang Gongfu Football Club (Chinese: 石家庄功夫足球俱乐部; pinyin: Shíjiāzhuāng Gōngfu Zúqiú Jùlèbù; lit. 'Shijiazhuang Kung Fu F.C.') is a Chinese professional football club based in Shijiazhuang, Hebei, that competes in China League One, the second tier of Chinese football. Shijiazhuang Gongfu plays its home matches at the Yutong International Sports Center, located within Chang'an District.

== History ==
The club was founded as Hebei Jingying Zhihai F.C. in 2020 by the former shareholders of Hebei Aoli Jingying (formerly Hebei Elite) after its acquisition by Beijing Sports University Group and co.

They participated in the Hebei FA Amateur League that year and were crowned as champions after beating Tangshan Haihuang Mingzhu in the final, which earned them the right to play in the 2020 Chinese Champions League, in which they lost to Yichun Jiangxi Tungsten Grand Tiger in the quarter-final play-off, as well as the crucial battle for promotion to China League Two, failing to promote.

In 2021, the club changed its name to Hebei Kungfu F.C., and were admitted into the 2021 China League Two due to the withdrawal of other teams.

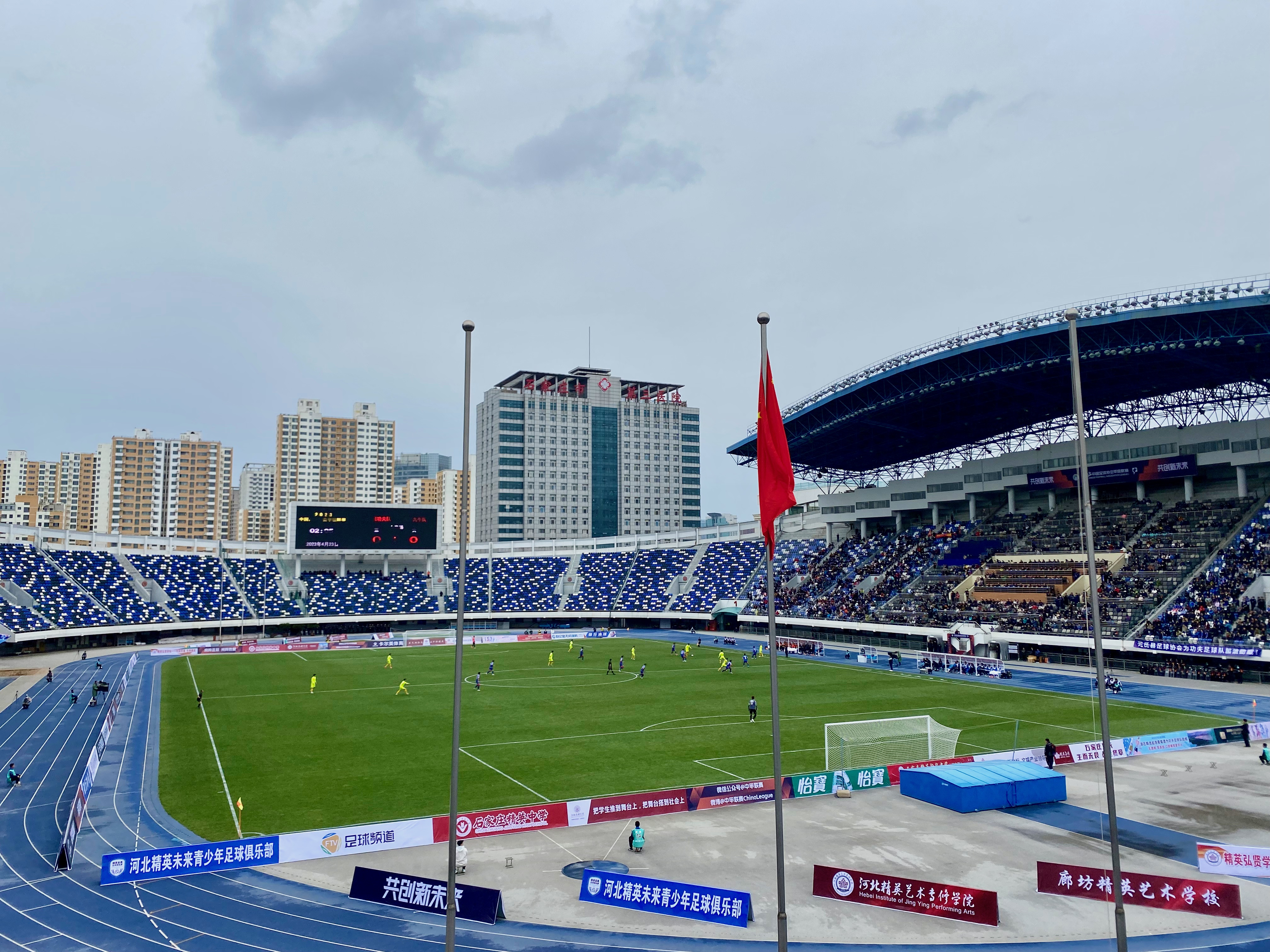
A Shijiazhuang Gongfu home match in 2023

In 2022, the club changed its name to Shijiazhuang Gongfu F.C..

== Name history ==
- 2020 Hebei Jingying Zhihai 河北精英志海
- 2021 Hebei Kungfu 河北功夫
- 2022– Shijiazhuang Gongfu 石家庄功夫

== Players ==
=== Current squad ===
As of July 2026

Note: Flags indicate national team as defined under FIFA eligibility rules; some limited exceptions apply. Players may hold more than one non-FIFA nationality.

No.	Pos.	Nation	Player
3	DF	CHN	Li Jingrun
4	MF	CHN	Pan Kui
5	DF	CHN	Niu Ziyi
6	DF	CHN	Zhao Shuhao
7	FW	SUR	Tyrone Conraad
8	MF	CHN	Du Zhixuan
9	MF	CHN	Guo Lingzi
10	MF	BRA	Higor Vidal
12	DF	CHN	Song Haoyu (on loan from Qingdao West Coast)
13	GK	CHN	Li Xuebo
14	MF	CHN	Xiao Jiayi
15	MF	CHN	Zhao Chenwei
17	MF	CHN	Sun Weizhe
18	DF	CHN	Zheng Zhiyun
19	GK	CHN	Li Yanan

No.	Pos.	Nation	Player
21	FW	CHN	Su Junqi
25	DF	CHN	Kurban Ibrahim
26	MF	CHN	Ma Junliang
27	DF	CHN	Ernar Hakimhan
28	MF	CHN	Zhang Yudong
29	DF	CHN	Shan Pengfei
30	MF	CHN	Zhou Wenhao
31	FW	BRA	Dominic Vinicius
33	GK	CHN	Li Yihao
34	MF	CHN	Liu Yuchen
36	DF	CHN	Yang Yun
37	GK	CHN	Long Yuhao
38	FW	TPE	Chen Hao-wei (on loan from Ningbo FC)
39	FW	CHN	Liu Baiyang (on loan from Shanghai Port B)

=== Out on loan ===
Note: Flags indicate national team as defined under FIFA eligibility rules; some limited exceptions apply. Players may hold more than one non-FIFA nationality.

No.	Pos.	Nation	Player
-	FW	CHN	Zhao Ziye (at Wuhan Three Towns B until 31 December 2026)
-	MF	CHN	Merdanjan Abdulklim (at Guizhou Guiyang Athletic until 31 December 2026)

No.	Pos.	Nation	Player
-	DF	CHN	Wang Haisheng (at Shanxi Chongde Ronghai until 31 December 2026)

== Coaching staff ==
=== Management ===
Position	Staff
Head coach	(Spain) Jesús Tato
Assistant coaches	(China) Xiao Zhanbo (China) Bai Jiayu (Portugal) Marco Silva
Goalkeeping coach	(China) Sun Le

== Managerial history ==
- (China) Zhang Hui (2020–2023)
- (China) Zhou Lin (2023–2024)
- (Spain) Juan Carlos Añón (2024)
- (Bulgaria) Zoran Janković (2024)
- (China) Liu Cheng (interim) (2024)
- (China) Zhang Hui (2025)
- (China) Niu Hongli (2025–2026)
- (Spain) Jesús Tato (2026–present)
