= List of Chinese football transfers summer 2019 =

This is a list of Chinese football transfers for the 2019 season summer transfer window. Super League and League One transfer window opened on 1 July 2019 and closed on 31 July 2019. League Two transfer window opened on 17 June 2019 and closed on 12 July 2019.

== Super League ==
=== Beijing Renhe ===
In:

| No. | Pos. | Nation | Player |
|---|---|---|---|
| 22 | FW | NED | Elvis Manu (from (Turkey) Akhisarspor) |
| 32 | DF | CHN | Zhang Chenlong (loan from Guangzhou R&F) |
| 59 | MF | CHN | Luo Jiewu (from Chongqing Dangdai Lifan) |

Out:

| No. | Pos. | Nation | Player |

=== Beijing Sinobo Guoan ===
In:

| No. | Pos. | Nation | Player |
|---|---|---|---|
| 11 | MF | BRA | Fernando (loan from (Russia) Spartak Moscow) |
| 61 | DF | CHN | Ruan Qilong (Free Agent) |
| 62 | MF | CHN | Shi Yucheng (Free Agent) |

Out:

| No. | Pos. | Nation | Player |
|---|---|---|---|
| 21 | MF | ESP | Jonathan Viera (loan to (Spain) Las Palmas) |
| 41 | MF | CHN | Gao Yunpeng (to Hebei China Fortune) |
| 56 | MF | CHN | Huang Haiwei (loan to Shaanxi Chang'an Athletic) |
| - | DF | CHN | Aysan Kadir (to Hubei Chufeng United) |

=== Chongqing Dangdai Lifan ===
In:

| No. | Pos. | Nation | Player |
|---|---|---|---|
| 22 | FW | BRA | Marcinho (from (Brazil) Internacional) |
| 29 | MF | CHN | Luo Senwen (loan from Hebei China Fortune) |

Out:

| No. | Pos. | Nation | Player |
|---|---|---|---|
| 10 | MF | CHN | Peng Xinli (to Shanghai Greenland Shenhua) |
| 32 | FW | BRA | Fernando Henrique (to Guangzhou Evergrande Taobao) |
| - | MF | CHN | Luo Jiewu (to Beijing Renhe) |

=== Dalian Yifang ===
In:

| No. | Pos. | Nation | Player |
|---|---|---|---|
| 9 | FW | VEN | Salomón Rondón (from (England) West Bromwich Albion) |
| 15 | FW | CHN | Shan Huanhuan (from (Portugal) Vitória S.C. B) |
| 27 | MF | CHN | Cheng Hui (from (Spain) Lleida Esportiu) |
| 31 | MF | CHN | Zheng Long (from Guangzhou Evergrande Taobao) |
| 32 | GK | CHN | Li Xuebo (from (Spain) Atlético Madrid) |
| 36 | DF | CHN | Zhou Xiao (from (Spain) Atlético Madrid) |
| 63 | MF | CHN | Hu Jiali (from Shanghai Greenland Shenhua) |

Out:

| No. | Pos. | Nation | Player |
|---|---|---|---|
| 30 | FW | ZIM | Nyasha Mushekwi (to Zhejiang Greentown) |
| 31 | MF | CHN | Zheng Long (loan return to Guangzhou Evergrande Taobao) |

=== Guangzhou Evergrande Taobao ===
In:

| No. | Pos. | Nation | Player |
|---|---|---|---|
| 15 | MF | CHN | Yan Dinghao (from (Portugal) Gondomar) |
| 18 | FW | CHN | Elkeson (from Shanghai SIPG) (Note: Player took Chinese citizenship to sign for club) |
| 27 | DF | CHN | Wu Shaocong (loan return from (Japan) Kyoto Sanga) |
| - | FW | BRA | Fernando Henrique (from Chongqing Dangdai Lifan) |
| - | FW | BRA | Aloísio (from Guangdong South China Tiger) |
| - | MF | SRB | Nemanja Gudelj (loan return from (Portugal) Sporting CP) |
| - | FW | COL | Jackson Martínez (loan return from (Portugal) Portimonense) |
| - | MF | CHN | Zheng Long (loan return from Dalian Yifang) |

Out:

| No. | Pos. | Nation | Player |
|---|---|---|---|
| 2 | DF | CHN | Liu Yiming (loan to Shenzhen F.C.) |
| 13 | MF | CHN | He Chao (loan to Jiangsu Suning) |
| 15 | MF | CHN | Yan Dinghao (loan return to (Portugal) Gondomar) |
| 26 | DF | CHN | Hu Ruibao (loan to Henan Jianye) |
| 37 | DF | CHN | Cai Mingmin (loan to Kunshan F.C.) |
| - | DF | CHN | Yang Zhaohui (loan to (Hong Kong) Kitchee FC) |
| - | MF | CHN | Wang Junhui (loan to Liaoning F.C.) |
| - | FW | CHN | Ma Sheng (to Shanxi Metropolis) |
| - | FW | BRA | Fernando Henrique (loan to Hebei China Fortune) |
| - | FW | BRA | Aloísio (loan to Guangdong South China Tiger) |
| - | MF | SRB | Nemanja Gudelj (to (Spain) Sevilla) |
| - | FW | COL | Jackson Martínez (to (Portugal) Portimonense) |
| - | MF | CHN | Zheng Long (to Dalian Yifang) |

=== Guangzhou R&F ===
In:

| No. | Pos. | Nation | Player |
|---|---|---|---|
| 15 | DF | CHN | Wang Huapeng (Free Agent) |
| 16 | MF | HKG | Tan Chun Lok (loan return from (Hong Kong) R&F) |
| 61 | MF | CHN | Chen Fuhai (loan return from (Hong Kong) R&F) |
| 62 | MF | CHN | Ning An (loan return from (Hong Kong) R&F) |
| 63 | MF | CHN | Zhang Jiajie (loan return from Sichuan Longfor) |
| 65 | GK | CHN | Liang Hua (Free Agent) |

Out:

| No. | Pos. | Nation | Player |
|---|---|---|---|
| 17 | DF | CHN | Zhang Chenlong (loan to Beijing Renhe) |
| 46 | DF | CHN | Li Long (to Kunshan F.C.) |
| 60 | MF | CHN | Cai Haojian (loan to Hubei Chufeng United) |

=== Hebei China Fortune ===
In:

| No. | Pos. | Nation | Player |
|---|---|---|---|
| 32 | FW | BRA | Fernando Henrique (loan from Guangzhou Evergrande Taobao) |
| 37 | DF | CHN | Pan Ximing (loan from Tianjin TEDA) |
| - | MF | CHN | Gao Yunpeng (from Beijing Sinobo Guoan) |

Out:

| No. | Pos. | Nation | Player |
|---|---|---|---|
| 6 | MF | CHN | Luo Senwen (loan to Chongqing Dangdai Lifan) |
| 7 | FW | CHN | Jiang Ning (to Taizhou Yuanda) |
| 16 | FW | MAR | Ayoub El Kaabi (loan to (Morocco) Wydad AC) |

=== Henan Jianye ===
In:

| No. | Pos. | Nation | Player |
|---|---|---|---|
| 2 | DF | CHN | Hu Ruibao (loan from Guangzhou Evergrande Taobao) |
| 37 | FW | BRA | Fernando Karanga (loan return from (Brazil) Nacional) |

Out:

| No. | Pos. | Nation | Player |
|---|---|---|---|
| 9 | FW | BRA | Henrique Dourado (loan to (Brazil) Palmeiras) |
| 46 | DF | CHN | Yang Chengyu (loan to Hubei Chufeng United) |
| 50 | MF | CHN | Song Hanchuan (loan to Inner Mongolia Caoshangfei) |
| 53 | DF | CHN | Jin Qi (loan to Inner Mongolia Caoshangfei) |
| 57 | DF | CHN | Long Cheng (to Jiangsu Suning) |
| - | DF | CHN | Huang Junjun (loan to Inner Mongolia Caoshangfei) |
| - | DF | CHN | Dai Yuhan (loan to Inner Mongolia Caoshangfei) |

=== Jiangsu Suning ===
In:

| No. | Pos. | Nation | Player |
|---|---|---|---|
| 13 | DF | BRA | Miranda (from (Italy) Inter Milan) |
| 21 | MF | CHN | He Chao (loan from Guangzhou Evergrande Taobao) |
| 25 | DF | CHN | Long Cheng (from Henan Jianye) |
| 26 | FW | CRO | Ivan Santini (from (Belgium) Anderlecht) |

Out:

| No. | Pos. | Nation | Player |
|---|---|---|---|
| 7 | MF | BRA | Ramires (to (Brazil) Palmeiras) |
| 16 | MF | CHN | Gao Tianyi (loan to Shenzhen F.C.) |
| 23 | GK | CHN | Li Haitao (loan to Suzhou Dongwu) |
| 29 | DF | ITA | Gabriel Paletta (Released) |
| 54 | MF | CHN | Yang Jiawei (loan to Zibo Cuju) |
| - | DF | CHN | Li Shizhou (loan to Taizhou Yuanda) |

=== Shandong Luneng Taishan ===
In:

| No. | Pos. | Nation | Player |
|---|---|---|---|
| 30 | MF | BRA | Moisés (from (Brazil) Palmeiras) |
| - | GK | CHN | Zhou Yuchen (loan return from (Hong Kong) R&F) |

Out:

| No. | Pos. | Nation | Player |
|---|---|---|---|
| 4 | DF | BRA | Gil (to (Brazil) Corinthians) |
| 15 | MF | CHN | Li Wei (to Zibo Cuju) |
| 29 | FW | CHN | Cheng Yuan (loan to Zibo Cuju) |
| 38 | FW | CHN | Liu Chaoyang (loan to Sichuan Longfor) |
| 57 | FW | CHN | Ji Shengpan (loan to Zibo Cuju) |
| - | GK | CHN | Zhou Yuchen (loan to (Hong Kong) R&F) |

=== Shanghai Greenland Shenhua ===
In:

| No. | Pos. | Nation | Player |
|---|---|---|---|
| 7 | MF | CHN | Wang Yongpo (from Tianjin Tianhai) |
| 20 | FW | KOR | Kim Shin-wook (from (South Korea) Jeonbuk Hyundai Motors) |
| 22 | MF | ITA | Stephan El Shaarawy (from (Italy) Roma) |
| 25 | MF | CHN | Peng Xinli (from Chongqing Dangdai Lifan) |
| 35 | DF | CHN | Li Yang (loan from (Portugal) Vitória) |
| - | GK | CHN | Peng Peng (loan return from Shanghai Shenxin) |
| - | DF | HKG | Brian Fok (loan return from (Portugal) Académico de Viseu) |

Out:

| No. | Pos. | Nation | Player |
|---|---|---|---|
| 2 | DF | CHN | Xu Yougang (loan to Liaoning F.C.) |
| 11 | MF | PAR | Óscar Romero (to (Argentina) San Lorenzo) |
| 13 | MF | COL | Fredy Guarín (to (Brazil) Vasco da Gama) |
| 50 | MF | CHN | Lü Pin (loan to Suzhou Dongwu) |
| - | MF | CHN | Hu Jiali (to Dalian Yifang) |
| - | GK | CHN | Peng Peng (loan to Qingdao Huanghai) |
| - | DF | HKG | Brian Fok (to (Hong Kong) Kitchee) |

=== Shanghai SIPG ===
In:

| No. | Pos. | Nation | Player |
|---|---|---|---|
| 7 | FW | AUT | Marko Arnautović (from (England) West Ham United) |

Out:

| No. | Pos. | Nation | Player |
|---|---|---|---|
| 9 | FW | BRA | Elkeson (to Guangzhou Evergrande Taobao) |
| - | GK | CHN | Chen Zhe (to Sichuan Jiuniu) |

=== Shenzhen F.C. ===
In:

| No. | Pos. | Nation | Player |
|---|---|---|---|
| 12 | FW | CMR | John Mary (from Meizhou Hakka) |
| 24 | DF | CHN | Liu Yiming (loan from Guangzhou Evergrande Taobao) |
| 33 | MF | CHN | Gao Tianyi (loan from Jiangsu Suning) |
| 40 | FW | POR | Dyego Sousa (from (Portugal) Braga) |

Out:

| No. | Pos. | Nation | Player |
|---|---|---|---|
| 7 | FW | NOR | Ola Kamara (to (United States) D.C. United) |
| 44 | MF | CHN | Wen Jun (to Lhasa Urban Construction Investment) |

=== Tianjin TEDA ===
In:

| No. | Pos. | Nation | Player |

Out:

| No. | Pos. | Nation | Player |
|---|---|---|---|
| - | DF | CHN | Liao Bochao (loan to Xi'an Yilian) |
| - | DF | CHN | Pan Ximing (loan to Hebei China Fortune) |

=== Tianjin Tianhai ===
In:

| No. | Pos. | Nation | Player |
|---|---|---|---|
| 4 | DF | KOR | Song Ju-hun (from (South Korea) Gyeongnam) |
| 29 | FW | BRA | Leonardo (Free Agent) |

Out:

| No. | Pos. | Nation | Player |
|---|---|---|---|
| 21 | DF | KOR | Kwon Kyung-won (loan to (South Korea) Jeonbuk Hyundai Motors) |
| 39 | MF | CHN | Wang Yongpo (to Shanghai Greenland Shenhua) |
| 51 | DF | CHN | Lu Jiawei (to Kunshan F.C.) |
| - | MF | CHN | Zhang Hanwen (to Jilin Baijia) |

=== Wuhan Zall ===
In:

| No. | Pos. | Nation | Player |
|---|---|---|---|
| 35 | DF | CHN | Chen Yuhao (loan from Zhejiang Yiteng) |

Out:

| No. | Pos. | Nation | Player |
|---|---|---|---|
| - | DF | CHN | Ma Zhiyuan (to Inner Mongolia Caoshangfei) |

== League One ==
=== Beijing BSU ===
In:

| No. | Pos. | Nation | Player |
|---|---|---|---|
| 13 | FW | ECU | Juan Luis Anangonó (from (Ecuador) L.D.U. Quito) |

Out:

| No. | Pos. | Nation | Player |
|---|---|---|---|
| 35 | MF | CHN | Wei Chaolun (loan to Suzhou Dongwu) |
| 55 | FW | CHN | Xu Yihai (to Hebei Aoli Jingying) |

=== Changchun Yatai ===
In:

| No. | Pos. | Nation | Player |
|---|---|---|---|
| 15 | DF | CHN | Sun Jie (loan return from (Norway) Stabæk) |
| 20 | FW | SRB | Stefan Drazic (from (Hungary) Mezőkövesdi SE) |

Out:

| No. | Pos. | Nation | Player |
|---|---|---|---|
| 6 | DF | CHN | Li Xiaoming (loan to Nantong Zhiyun) |
| 10 | MF | ESP | Jose Manuel Jurado (to (Spain) Cádiz CF) |

=== Guangdong South China Tiger ===
In:

| No. | Pos. | Nation | Player |
|---|---|---|---|
| 8 | FW | BRA | Aloísio (loan from Guangzhou Evergrande Taobao) |

Out:

| No. | Pos. | Nation | Player |
|---|---|---|---|
| 8 | FW | BRA | Aloísio (to Guangzhou Evergrande Taobao) |
| 16 | DF | CHN | Yang Junjie (loan to Sichuan Jiuniu) |
| 17 | FW | CHN | Liu Yang (loan to Sichuan Jiuniu) |
| 38 | DF | CHN | Tu Dongxu (to Kunshan F.C.) |

=== Guizhou Hengfeng ===
In:

| No. | Pos. | Nation | Player |
|---|---|---|---|
| - | DF | CIV | Kévin Boli (loan return from (Romania) CFR Cluj) |
| - | MF | NED | Tjaronn Chery (loan return from (Turkey) Kayserispor) |

Out:

| No. | Pos. | Nation | Player |
|---|---|---|---|
| 59 | DF | CHN | Cai Peilei (to Heze Caozhou) |
| 60 | GK | CHN | Liu Chang (loan to Qingdao Red Lions) |
| - | DF | CIV | Kévin Boli (loan to (Romania) CFR Cluj) |
| - | MF | NED | Tjaronn Chery (to (Israel) Maccabi Haifa) |

=== Heilongjiang Lava Spring ===
In:

| No. | Pos. | Nation | Player |
|---|---|---|---|
| 22 | MF | CHN | Wen Xue (from Yanbian Hailanjiang) |
| 39 | FW | MTQ | Yoann Arquin (from (England) Yeovil Town) |

Out:

| No. | Pos. | Nation | Player |
|---|---|---|---|
| 58 | FW | CHN | Su Jianhu (to Qingdao Red Lions) |

=== Inner Mongolia Zhongyou ===
In:

| No. | Pos. | Nation | Player |
|---|---|---|---|
| 31 | FW | BRA | Guto (from Shaanxi Chang'an Athletic) |

Out:

| No. | Pos. | Nation | Player |
|---|---|---|---|
| 19 | FW | NGA | John Owoeri (to Shaanxi Chang'an Athletic) |
| 21 | MF | CHN | Mou Shantao (to (Portugal) Sintrense) |
| 26 | DF | CHN | Zhang Chenliang (loan return to Hebei Aoli Jingying) |

=== Liaoning F.C. ===
In:

| No. | Pos. | Nation | Player |
|---|---|---|---|
| 34 | MF | CHN | Wang Junhui (loan from Guangzhou Evergrande Taobao) |
| 35 | DF | CHN | Xu Yougang (loan from Shanghai Greenland Shenhua) |

Out:

| No. | Pos. | Nation | Player |
|---|---|---|---|
| 20 | MF | CHN | Wang Qiao (loan to Sichuan Jiuniu) |

=== Meizhou Hakka ===
In:

| No. | Pos. | Nation | Player |
|---|---|---|---|
| 23 | MF | SRB | Lazar Arsić (from (Serbia) Voždovac) |

Out:

| No. | Pos. | Nation | Player |
|---|---|---|---|
| 4 | DF | CHN | Luo Xi (loan to Shenzhen Pengcheng) |
| 8 | DF | BRA | Chiquinho (to (Brazil) Vitória) |
| 12 | FW | CMR | John Mary (to Shenzhen F.C.) |
| 13 | MF | CHN | Zhang Zhiquan (loan to Shenzhen Pengcheng) |
| 57 | DF | CHN | Zhou Zihao (to Shenzhen Pengcheng) |
| 58 | MF | CHN | Tang Hai (loan to Shenzhen Pengcheng) |

=== Nantong Zhiyun ===
In:

| No. | Pos. | Nation | Player |
|---|---|---|---|
| 14 | DF | CHN | Li Xiaoming (loan from Changchun Yatai) |
| 23 | FW | POR | João Silva (from (Portugal) Feirense) |
| 72 | DF | CHN | Xie Zhen (from Inner Mongolia Caoshangfei) |

Out:

| No. | Pos. | Nation | Player |
|---|---|---|---|
| 16 | FW | CHN | Wang Si (loan to Hangzhou Wuyue Qiantang) |
| 24 | DF | CHN | Li Hao (loan to Hangzhou Wuyue Qiantang) |

=== Qingdao Huanghai ===
In:

| No. | Pos. | Nation | Player |
|---|---|---|---|
| 24 | MF | CIV | Yaya Touré (Free Agent) |
| 36 | GK | CHN | Peng Peng (loan from Shanghai Greenland Shenhua) |

Out:

| No. | Pos. | Nation | Player |

=== Shaanxi Chang'an Athletic ===
In:

| No. | Pos. | Nation | Player |
|---|---|---|---|
| 30 | FW | NGA | John Owoeri (from Inner Mongolia Zhongyou) |
| 38 | MF | CHN | Huang Haiwei (loan from Beijing Sinobo Guoan) |
| 61 | DF | CHN | Lin Yixiang (from Shaanxi Laochenggen) |
| 62 | DF | CHN | Liu Jie (from Yanbian Hailanjiang) |
| 63 | FW | CHN | Almjan Abdugheni (from Yanbian Beiguo) |
| 64 | MF | CHN | Song Xiaoyu (from Dalian Chanjoy) |
| 65 | DF | CHN | Liu Jiaxin (from Dalian Chanjoy) |
| 70 | DF | CHN | Xu Jiahui (from Anshan Dingsheng) |

Out:

| No. | Pos. | Nation | Player |
|---|---|---|---|
| 15 | FW | BRA | Guto (to Inner Mongolia Zhongyou) |

=== Shanghai Shenxin ===
In:

| No. | Pos. | Nation | Player |
|---|---|---|---|
| 32 | MF | SEN | Aladji Mansour Ba (Free Agent) |
| 36 | DF | CHN | Zhao Zuojun (Free Agent) |
| 39 | FW | BRA | Alex (loan from (Japan) Kagoshima United) |

Out:

| No. | Pos. | Nation | Player |
|---|---|---|---|
| 4 | DF | CHN | Zhang Yifeng (to Shijiazhuang Ever Bright) |
| 7 | FW | CHN | Pan Chaoran (to Shijiazhuang Ever Bright) |
| 12 | GK | CHN | Peng Peng (loan return to Shanghai Greenland Shenhua) |
| 24 | MF | CHN | Zhang Yudong (to Kunshan F.C.) |
| 58 | FW | CHN | He Qiyuan (to Qingdao Red Lions) |

=== Shijiazhuang Ever Bright ===
In:

| No. | Pos. | Nation | Player |
|---|---|---|---|
| 61 | DF | CHN | Wang Peng (Free Agent) |
| 63 | FW | CHN | Pan Chaoran (from Shanghai Shenxin) |
| 64 | DF | CHN | Zhang Yifeng (from Shanghai Shenxin) |

Out:

| No. | Pos. | Nation | Player |
|---|---|---|---|
| 55 | MF | CHN | Wang Hongyu (loan to Zhejiang Yiteng) |

=== Sichuan Longfor ===
In:

| No. | Pos. | Nation | Player |
|---|---|---|---|
| 20 | FW | BRA | Jonathan Balotelli (from (Iran) Sanat Naft) |
| 21 | FW | CHN | Liu Chaoyang (loan from Shandong Luneng Taishan) |
| 30 | DF | CHN | Huang Wei (loan from (Portugal) Vitória S.C. B) |

Out:

| No. | Pos. | Nation | Player |
|---|---|---|---|
| 4 | DF | SRB | Nikola Petković (to (Serbia) Vojvodina) |
| 24 | MF | CHN | Zhang Jiajie (loan return to Guangzhou R&F) |
| 29 | FW | CHN | Zhang Xiao (to Chengdu Better City) |

=== Xinjiang Tianshan Leopard ===
In:

| No. | Pos. | Nation | Player |
|---|---|---|---|
| 39 | FW | BRA | Naldinho (from (Kuwait) Al-Shabab) |
| 67 | MF | CHN | Abudunabi Adiljan (Free Agent) |

Out:

| No. | Pos. | Nation | Player |

=== Zhejiang Greentown ===
In:

| No. | Pos. | Nation | Player |
|---|---|---|---|
| 14 | FW | ZIM | Nyasha Mushekwi (from Dalian Yifang) |

Out:

| No. | Pos. | Nation | Player |
|---|---|---|---|
| 5 | DF | CHN | Jin Haoxiang (loan to Taizhou Yuanda) |

== League Two ==
=== North League ===
==== Baoding Yingli ETS ====
In:

| No. | Pos. | Nation | Player |
|---|---|---|---|
| 2 | DF | CHN | Zhang Sen (from Jiangxi Liansheng) |
| 22 | GK | CHN | Zhou Jiping (Free Agent) |
| 30 | MF | CHN | Meng Yang (Free Agent) |
| 32 | FW | CHN | Deng Ang (Free Agent) |
| 38 | MF | CHN | Fu Zihao (Free Agent) |
| 39 | FW | CHN | Han Yuhao (loan from Zibo Cuju) |

Out:

| No. | Pos. | Nation | Player |

==== Beijing BIT ====
In:

| No. | Pos. | Nation | Player |
|---|---|---|---|
| 41 | MF | CHN | Wang Jian (Free Agent) |
| 42 | FW | CHN | Chen Jidong (Free Agent) |
| 43 | DF | CHN | Liu Lei (Free Agent) |

Out:

| No. | Pos. | Nation | Player |

==== Dalian Chanjoy ====
In:

| No. | Pos. | Nation | Player |
|---|---|---|---|
| 4 | MF | CHN | Li Zhendong (Free Agent) |
| 15 | DF | CHN | Wang Guanghao (Free Agent) |
| 25 | FW | CHN | Zhang Depeng (from Yanbian Beiguo) |
| 28 | DF | CHN | Fan Peipei (Free Agent) |
| 30 | MF | CHN | Xian Tao (Free Agent) |

Out:

| No. | Pos. | Nation | Player |
|---|---|---|---|
| 2 | DF | CHN | Wang Peng (to Lhasa Urban Construction Investment) |
| 5 | DF | CHN | Liu Jiaxin (to Shaanxi Chang'an Athletic) |
| 7 | MF | CHN | Wang Xin (to Zhejiang Yiteng) |
| 11 | MF | CHN | Ge Yuxiang (to Zhejiang Yiteng) |
| 17 | MF | CHN | Song Xiaoyu (to Shaanxi Chang'an Athletic) |
| 18 | DF | CHN | Chen Huifeng (to Guangxi Baoyun) |
| 19 | FW | CHN | Xu Xin (to Taizhou Yuanda) |
| 27 | FW | CHN | Yang Bing (to Guangxi Baoyun) |
| 32 | MF | CHN | Zhao Haichao (to Guangxi Baoyun) |

==== Hebei Aoli Jingying ====
In:

| No. | Pos. | Nation | Player |
|---|---|---|---|
| 19 | DF | CHN | Liu Pujin (Free Agent) |
| 25 | FW | CHN | Xu Yihai (from Beijing BSU) |
| 40 | DF | CHN | Zhang Chenliang (loan return from Inner Mongolia Zhongyou) |
| 41 | MF | CHN | Fu Shang (Free Agent) |

Out:

| No. | Pos. | Nation | Player |
|---|---|---|---|
| 8 | FW | CHN | He Yuxuan (loan to Guangxi Baoyun) |

==== Inner Mongolia Caoshangfei ====
In:

| No. | Pos. | Nation | Player |
|---|---|---|---|
| 5 | DF | CHN | Jin Qi (loan from Henan Jianye) |
| 8 | DF | CHN | Huang Junjun (loan from Henan Jianye) |
| 11 | DF | CHN | Dai Yuhan (loan from Henan Jianye) |
| 16 | MF | CHN | Song Hanchuan (loan from Henan Jianye) |
| 20 | MF | CHN | Zhang Wu (from (Serbia) Trayal) |
| 41 | DF | CHN | Ma Zhiyuan (from Wuhan Zall) |

Out:

| No. | Pos. | Nation | Player |
|---|---|---|---|
| 40 | DF | CHN | Xie Zhen (to Nantong Zhiyun) |

==== Jiangsu Yancheng Dingli ====
In:

| No. | Pos. | Nation | Player |
|---|---|---|---|
| 10 | MF | CHN | Wu Qingsong (Free Agent) |
| 18 | DF | CHN | Li Minhui (loan from Suzhou Dongwu) |
| 29 | MF | CHN | Zhang Xu (Free Agent) |

Out:

| No. | Pos. | Nation | Player |
|---|---|---|---|
| 2 | DF | CHN | Geng Xiaoshun (to Sichuan Jiuniu) |
| 12 | MF | CHN | Zhang Gen (to Jiangxi Liansheng) |
| 16 | MF | CHN | Gong Hankui (to Chengdu Better City) |

==== Jilin Baijia ====
In:

| No. | Pos. | Nation | Player |
|---|---|---|---|
| 15 | MF | CHN | Zhao Yuan (Free Agent) |
| 16 | MF | CHN | Zhang Hanwen (from Tianjin Tianhai) |
| 23 | GK | CHN | Zhang Weisheng (Free Agent) |
| 25 | MF | CHN | Wang Ke (Free Agent) |
| 31 | GK | CHN | Raxiat Iminjan (Free Agent) |
| 32 | MF | CHN | Zhang Xuhui (Free Agent) |

Out:

| No. | Pos. | Nation | Player |

==== Qingdao Jonoon ====
In:

| No. | Pos. | Nation | Player |
|---|---|---|---|
| 2 | MF | CHN | Wei Chao (Free Agent) |
| 21 | DF | CHN | Huang Zhun (loan from Sichuan Jiuniu) |

Out:

| No. | Pos. | Nation | Player |

==== Qingdao Red Lions ====
In:

| No. | Pos. | Nation | Player |
|---|---|---|---|
| 11 | FW | CHN | Deng Yunong (Free Agent) |
| 21 | FW | CHN | He Qiyuan (from Shanghai Shenxin) |
| 23 | GK | CHN | Liu Chang (loan from Guizhou Hengfeng) |
| 24 | FW | CHN | Sun Jiangshan (Free Agent) |
| 34 | DF | CHN | Jiang Yinghao (from (Georgia (country)) FC Torpedo Kutaisi) |
| 38 | FW | CHN | Su Jianhu (from Heilongjiang Lava Spring) |

Out:

| No. | Pos. | Nation | Player |

==== Shanxi Metropolis ====
In:

| No. | Pos. | Nation | Player |
|---|---|---|---|
| 6 | FW | CHN | Shen Tong (loan from Zibo Cuju) |
| 16 | MF | CHN | Hui Ge (from Yangzhou Huaao Fengyun) |
| 22 | FW | CHN | Ma Sheng (from Guangzhou Evergrande Taobao) |
| 26 | DF | CHN | Si Xiao (loan from Zibo Cuju) |
| 28 | DF | CHN | Shen Hao (Free Agent) |
| 33 | GK | CHN | Chen Guolong (Free Agent) |
| 34 | MF | CHN | Sun Yi (loan from Zibo Cuju) |
| 45 | FW | CHN | Ablimit Abdurop (from Yanbian Beiguo) |

Out:

| No. | Pos. | Nation | Player |
|---|---|---|---|
| 10 | FW | CHN | Gao Shipeng (to Shenyang Urban) |

==== Shenyang Urban ====
In:

| No. | Pos. | Nation | Player |
|---|---|---|---|
| 7 | FW | CHN | Dong Xiang (Free Agent) |
| 12 | FW | CHN | Gao Shipeng (from Shanxi Metropolis) |
| 25 | GK | CHN | Bu Xize (Free Agent) |
| 34 | MF | CHN | Ning Hao (Free Agent) |

Out:

| No. | Pos. | Nation | Player |

==== Taizhou Yuanda ====
In:

| No. | Pos. | Nation | Player |
|---|---|---|---|
| 12 | MF | CHN | Tao Hongliang (from (Norway) Stabæk) |
| 20 | DF | CHN | Li Shizhou (loan from Jiangsu Suning) |
| 22 | FW | CHN | Xu Xin (from Dalian Chanjoy) |
| 26 | FW | CHN | Jiang Ning (from Hebei China Fortune) |
| 36 | DF | CHN | Jin Haoxiang (loan from Zhejiang Greentown) |

Out:

| No. | Pos. | Nation | Player |
|---|---|---|---|
| 7 | MF | CHN | Gao Xinyu (to Nanjing Balanta) |
| 18 | DF | CHN | Sun Wujun (to Nanjing Balanta) |
| 19 | MF | CHN | Gao Teng (to Shandong Wangyue) |

==== Xi'an Daxing Chongde ====
In:

| No. | Pos. | Nation | Player |
|---|---|---|---|
| 13 | DF | CHN | Sun Shuangjian (Free Agent) |
| 18 | MF | CHN | Yang Jiutian (Free Agent) |
| 23 | GK | CHN | Song Song (Free Agent) |
| 25 | MF | CHN | Wang Kun (Free Agent) |
| 29 | FW | CHN | Chen Peng (Free Agent) |
| 39 | MF | CHN | Liu Jin (Free Agent) |
| 40 | FW | CHN | Guo Wenjian (from Sichuan Jiuniu) |
| 41 | MF | CHN | Zhang Junqian (Free Agent) |

Out:

| No. | Pos. | Nation | Player |

==== Yanbian Beiguo ====
In:

| No. | Pos. | Nation | Player |
|---|---|---|---|
| 7 | MF | CHN | Pei Yuwen (from Yanbian Hailanjiang) |
| 26 | DF | CHN | Wu Yongchun (from Yanbian Hailanjiang) |
| 27 | MF | CHN | Li Hao (from Yanbian Hailanjiang) |
| 30 | GK | CHN | Yin Guang (from Yanbian Hailanjiang) |
| 38 | DF | CHN | Li Jinyu (from Yanbian Hailanjiang) |

Out:

| No. | Pos. | Nation | Player |
|---|---|---|---|
| 9 | FW | CHN | Zhang Depeng (to Dalian Chanjoy) |
| 10 | FW | CHN | Almjan Abdugheni (to Shaanxi Chang'an Athletic) |
| 40 | FW | CHN | Ablimit Abdurop (to Shanxi Metropolis) |

==== Yinchuan Helanshan ====
In:

| No. | Pos. | Nation | Player |
|---|---|---|---|
| 34 | FW | CHN | Du Jinlong (Free Agent) |
| 37 | FW | CHN | He Chun (Free Agent) |

Out:

| No. | Pos. | Nation | Player |
|---|---|---|---|
| 7 | MF | CHN | Su Junfeng (to Sichuan Jiuniu) |

==== Zibo Cuju ====
In:

| No. | Pos. | Nation | Player |
|---|---|---|---|
| 10 | FW | CHN | Cheng Yuan (loan from Shandong Luneng) |
| 14 | MF | CHN | Yang Jiawei (loan from Jiangsu Suning) |
| 15 | MF | CHN | Li Wei (from Shandong Luneng) |
| 17 | MF | CHN | Han Guanghui (Free Agent) |
| 30 | FW | CHN | Ji Shengpan (loan from Shandong Luneng) |

Out:

| No. | Pos. | Nation | Player |
|---|---|---|---|
| 26 | DF | CHN | Si Xiao (loan to Shanxi Metropolis) |
| 27 | FW | CHN | Shen Tong (loan to Shanxi Metropolis) |
| 34 | MF | CHN | Sun Yi (loan to Shanxi Metropolis) |
| 38 | FW | CHN | Han Yuhao (loan to Baoding Yingli ETS) |

=== South League ===
==== Chengdu Better City ====
In:

| No. | Pos. | Nation | Player |
|---|---|---|---|
| 2 | MF | CHN | Gong Hankui (from Jiangsu Yancheng Dingli) |
| 6 | MF | CHN | Ouyang Xue (Free Agent) |
| 30 | FW | CHN | Zhang Xiao (from Sichuan Longfor) |
| 33 | DF | CHN | Zhuang Yuan (Free Agent) |

Out:

| No. | Pos. | Nation | Player |

==== Fujian Tianxin ====
In:

| No. | Pos. | Nation | Player |
|---|---|---|---|
| 40 | MF | CHN | Wang Haile (Free Agent) |
| 41 | MF | CHN | Lei Yucheng (Free Agent) |

Out:

| No. | Pos. | Nation | Player |

==== Guangxi Baoyun ====
In:

| No. | Pos. | Nation | Player |
|---|---|---|---|
| 26 | DF | CHN | Chen Huifeng (from Dalian Chanjoy) |
| 27 | FW | CHN | Yang Bing (from Dalian Chanjoy) |
| 29 | MF | CHN | Tang Ge (Free Agent) |
| 32 | MF | CHN | Zhao Haichao (from Dalian Chanjoy) |
| 33 | FW | CHN | He Yuxuan (loan from Hebei Aoli Jingying) |

Out:

| No. | Pos. | Nation | Player |
|---|---|---|---|
| 6 | DF | CHN | Wang Baoda (to Nanjing Balanta) |

==== Hangzhou Wuyue Qiantang ====
In:

| No. | Pos. | Nation | Player |
|---|---|---|---|
| 3 | DF | CHN | Liu Bin (Free Agent) |
| 9 | MF | CHN | Wang Zhewei (from Yiwu Lejian) |
| 16 | FW | CHN | Wang Si (loan from Nantong Zhiyun) |
| 23 | GK | CHN | Lin Yao (Free Agent) |
| 24 | DF | CHN | Li Hao (loan from Nantong Zhiyun) |
| 38 | MF | CHN | Zhang Zhikang (Free Agent) |

Out:

| No. | Pos. | Nation | Player |

==== Hubei Chufeng United ====
In:

| No. | Pos. | Nation | Player |
|---|---|---|---|
| 19 | MF | CHN | Cai Haojian (loan from Guangzhou R&F) |
| 38 | MF | CHN | Li Shiwei (Free Agent) |
| 40 | DF | CHN | Aysan Kadir (from Beijing Sinobo Guoan) |
| 41 | MF | CHN | Yang Haoyu (Free Agent) |
| 42 | DF | CHN | Yang Chengyu (loan from Henan Jianye) |

Out:

| No. | Pos. | Nation | Player |

==== Hunan Billows ====
In:

| No. | Pos. | Nation | Player |
|---|---|---|---|
| 11 | MF | CHN | He Yaqi (Free Agent) |
| 16 | DF | CHN | Xiong Tao (Free Agent) |
| 18 | MF | CHN | Chen Shuo (from Wuhan Three Towns) |
| 25 | DF | CHN | Zheng Cong (from Shandong Wangyue) |
| 26 | GK | CHN | Li Luning (Free Agent) |

Out:

| No. | Pos. | Nation | Player |
|---|---|---|---|
| 10 | MF | CHN | Ruan Yang (to Kunshan F.C.) |
| 31 | DF | CHN | Liu Shuai (to Jiangxi Liansheng) |

==== Jiangxi Liansheng ====
In:

| No. | Pos. | Nation | Player |
|---|---|---|---|
| 13 | MF | CHN | Zhang Gen (from Jiangsu Yancheng Dingli) |
| 22 | FW | CHN | Zhang Hao (from Shenzhen Pengcheng) |
| 30 | MF | CHN | Zhang Jian (Free agent) |
| 31 | DF | CHN | Liu Shuai (from Hunan Billows) |

Out:

| No. | Pos. | Nation | Player |
|---|---|---|---|
| 25 | DF | CHN | Zhang Sen (to Baoding Yingli ETS) |

==== Kunshan F.C. ====
In:

| No. | Pos. | Nation | Player |
|---|---|---|---|
| 4 | MF | CHN | Ruan Yang (from Hunan Billows) |
| 15 | DF | CHN | Zhang Wei (Free Agent) |
| 20 | MF | CHN | Zhang Yudong (from Shanghai Shenxin) |
| 22 | DF | CHN | Pan Jiajun (Free Agent) |
| 27 | DF | CHN | Tu Dongxu (from Guangdong South China Tiger) |
| 39 | DF | CHN | Lu Jiawei (from Tianjin Tianhai) |
| 41 | DF | CHN | Cai Mingmin (loan from Guangzhou Evergrande) |
| 42 | DF | CHN | Li Long (from Guangzhou R&F) |

Out:

| No. | Pos. | Nation | Player |

==== Lhasa Urban Construction Investment ====
In:

| No. | Pos. | Nation | Player |
|---|---|---|---|
| 26 | DF | CHN | Wang Peng (from Dalian Chanjoy) |
| 27 | DF | CHN | Wang Zhenxiang (Free Agent) |
| 29 | FW | CHN | Zhou Bingxu (from Ningbo Yinbo) |
| 30 | MF | CHN | Dawa Tsring (Free Agent) |
| 39 | MF | CHN | Wen Jun (from Shenzhen F.C.) |

Out:

| No. | Pos. | Nation | Player |

==== Nanjing Shaye ====
In:

| No. | Pos. | Nation | Player |
|---|---|---|---|
| 7 | FW | CHN | A Xu (from Qingdao Kunpeng) |
| 10 | FW | CHN | Bian Jun (Free Agent) |
| 17 | FW | CHN | Wen Xiang (Free Agent) |
| 22 | GK | CHN | Wang Yi (Free Agent) |

Out:

| No. | Pos. | Nation | Player |

==== Shenzhen Pengcheng ====
In:

| No. | Pos. | Nation | Player |
|---|---|---|---|
| 12 | MF | CHN | Zhang Zhiquan (loan from Meizhou Hakka) |
| 27 | DF | CHN | Zhou Zihao (from Meizhou Hakka) |
| 29 | DF | CHN | Luo Xi (loan from Meizhou Hakka) |
| 37 | MF | CHN | Tang Hai (loan from Meizhou Hakka) |

Out:

| No. | Pos. | Nation | Player |
|---|---|---|---|
| 8 | MF | CHN | Ye Shuwen (to Shenzhen Bogang) |
| 10 | FW | CHN | Zhang Hao (to Jiangxi Liansheng) |
| 15 | DF | CHN | Sun Wenlong (to Hubei Huachuang) |

==== Sichuan Jiuniu ====
In:

| No. | Pos. | Nation | Player |
|---|---|---|---|
| 2 | DF | CHN | Geng Xiaoshun (from Jiangsu Yancheng Dingli) |
| 4 | MF | CHN | Wang Qiao (loan from Liaoning F.C.) |
| 17 | MF | CHN | Su Junfeng (from Yinchuan Helanshan) |
| 26 | FW | CHN | Liu Yang (loan from Guangdong South China Tiger) |
| 32 | DF | CHN | Yang Junjie (loan from Guangdong South China Tiger) |
| 39 | MF | CHN | Tan Yang (loan from (Portugal) Vizela) |
| 40 | GK | CHN | Chen Zhe (from Shanghai SIPG) |

Out:

| No. | Pos. | Nation | Player |
|---|---|---|---|
| 3 | DF | CHN | Huang Zhun (loan to Qingdao Jonoon) |
| 6 | MF | CHN | Yang Xinxin (to Shenzhen Bogang) |
| 38 | FW | CHN | Guo Wenjian (to Xi'an Daxing Chongde) |

==== Suzhou Dongwu ====
In:

| No. | Pos. | Nation | Player |
|---|---|---|---|
| 22 | MF | CHN | Lü Pin (loan from Shanghai Greenland Shenhua) |
| 23 | GK | CHN | Li Haitao (loan from Jiangsu Suning) |
| 30 | DF | CHN | Zhang Linguang (Free Agent) |
| 34 | DF | CHN | Cheng Mouyi (Free Agent) |
| 40 | MF | CHN | Wei Chaolun (loan from Beijing BSU) |

Out:

| No. | Pos. | Nation | Player |
|---|---|---|---|
| 10 | MF | CHN | Dilmurat Batur (to Shenzhen Bogang) |
| 17 | FW | CHN | Liu Feng (to Hubei Huachuang) |
| 25 | DF | CHN | Li Minhui (loan to Jiangsu Yancheng Dingli) |

==== Wuhan Three Towns ====
In:

| No. | Pos. | Nation | Player |
|---|---|---|---|
| 24 | MF | CHN | Wang Rui (Free Agent) |
| 37 | DF | CHN | Lyu Xuean (Free Agent) |

Out:

| No. | Pos. | Nation | Player |
|---|---|---|---|
| 4 | MF | CHN | Hu Xi (to Xi'an Yilian) |
| 34 | MF | CHN | Chen Shuo (to Hunan Billows) |

==== Yunnan Kunlu ====
In:

| No. | Pos. | Nation | Player |
|---|---|---|---|
| 5 | DF | CHN | Wang Dong (Free Agent) |
| 11 | MF | CHN | Shen Jixing (Free Agent) |
| 17 | DF | CHN | Zhu Minghui (Free Agent) |
| 18 | MF | CHN | Wang Tong (Free Agent) |
| 19 | MF | CHN | Zhang Shuoke (Free Agent) |
| 41 | FW | CHN | He Shaolin (Free Agent) |
| 44 | DF | CHN | Zhang Fangwei (Free Agent) |

Out:

| No. | Pos. | Nation | Player |

==== Zhejiang Yiteng ====
In:

| No. | Pos. | Nation | Player |
|---|---|---|---|
| 7 | MF | CHN | Wang Xin (from Dalian Chanjoy) |
| 17 | MF | CHN | Ge Yuxiang (from Dalian Chanjoy) |
| 24 | MF | CHN | Wang Hongyu (loan from Shijiazhuang Ever Bright) |
| 27 | GK | CHN | Chen Yongxin (Free Agent) |

Out:

| No. | Pos. | Nation | Player |
|---|---|---|---|
| 38 | DF | CHN | Chen Yuhao (loan to Wuhan Zall) |
