= Xie Zhen =

Xie Zhen may refer to:

- Xie Zhen (poet) (1495–1575), Ming dynasty poet
- Xie Zhen (Water Margin), fictional Song dynasty outlaw hero from the novel Water Margin
- Xie Zhen (footballer), Chinese footballer
