= Wang Dong =

Wang Dong may refer to:

- Wang Dong (footballer, born 1981), Chinese footballer
- Wang Dong (footballer, born 1985), Chinese footballer
- Wang Dong (footballer, born 1995), Chinese footballer
- Wang Dong (swimmer) (born 1986), Chinese swimmer
- Wang Dong (diplomat) (1922–1983), Chinese diplomat
- Wang Dong (hacker), Chinese computer hacker
