= Ma Sheng =

Chinese footballer

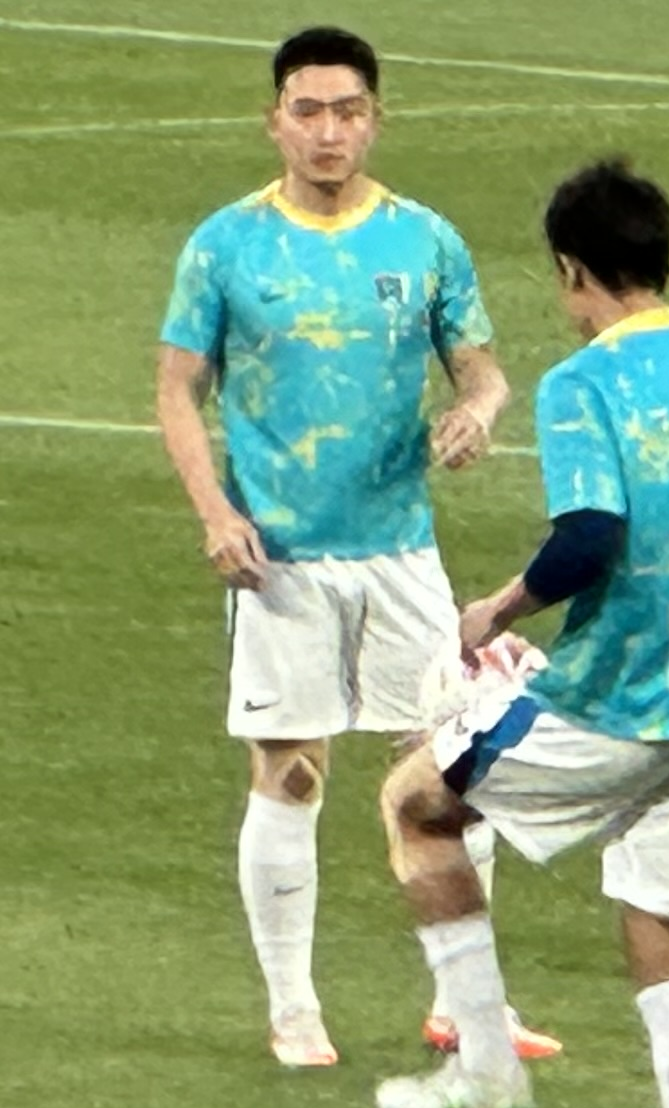
- Ma Sheng in May 2025

Personal information
- Date of birth: 18 February 1997 (age 29)
- Place of birth: Anqing, Anhui, China
- Height: 1.85 m (6 ft 1 in)
- Position: Defender

Team information
- Current team: Shaanxi Union
- Number: 5

Youth career
- 2007-2011: Beijing Cross Country Football Club
- 2012-2016: Hebei Elite
- 2013-2016: Botafogo-SP (Loan)

Senior career*
Years	Team	Apps	(Gls)
2016–2020	Hebei Elite	84	(3)
2021–2025	Nantong Zhiyun	114	(0)
2026–	Shaanxi Union	0	(0)
- * Club domestic league appearances and goals as of 14:01, 31 December 2022 (UTC)

Ma Sheng (Chinese: 马晟; born 18 February 1997) is a Chinese footballer currently playing as a defender for Shaanxi Union.

== Club career ==
Ma Sheng moved to Beijing from Anqing, Anhui to study before joining the Hebei Elite youth training program, where they sent their youth players to study abroad in Brazil. He caught the attention of Botafogo-SP's youth training director who kept him at the club throughout his youth development. He went on to return to Hebei and start his senior professional career with them. He remained with them for several seasons until he joined second tier club Nantong Zhiyun on 18 March 2021. He then went on to make his debut in a league game on 1 May 2021 against Kunshan in a 1-0 victory. Moving on, Ma Sheng went ahead to establish himself within the team and helped the club gain promotion to the top tier at the end of the 2022 China League One season.

== Career statistics ==
As of 31 December 2024.

Club	Season	League			Cup		Continental		Other		Total	
Club	Season	Division	Apps	Goals	Apps	Goals	Apps	Goals	Apps	Goals	Apps	Goals
Hebei Elite	2016	China League Two	6	0	0	0	–		–		6	0
Hebei Elite	2017	China League Two	14	1	0	0	–		–		14	1
Hebei Elite	2018	China League Two	24	0	0	0	–		–		24	0
Hebei Elite	2019	China League Two	34	2	4	0	–		–		38	2
Hebei Elite	2020	China League Two	6	0	0	0	–		–		6	0
Hebei Elite	Total		84	3	4	0	0	0	0	0	88	3
Nantong Zhiyun	2021	China League One	29	0	1	0	–		–		30	0
Nantong Zhiyun	2022	China League One	31	0	0	0	–		–		31	0
Nantong Zhiyun	2023	Chinese Super League	11	0	0	0	–		–		11	0
Nantong Zhiyun	2024	Chinese Super League	18	0	0	0	–		–		18	0
Nantong Zhiyun	Total		89	0	1	0	0	0	0	0	90	0
Career total			173	3	5	0	0	0	0	0	178	3
