= Xie Xiaofan =

Chinese association football player

Personal information
- Date of birth: 15 March 1998 (age 28)
- Place of birth: Nanjing, Jiangsu, China
- Height: 1.77 m (5 ft 10 in)
- Positions: Left-back; left winger

Team information
- Current team: Wuxi Wugo
- Number: 3

Youth career
- –2017: Jiangsu Suning

Senior career*
Years	Team	Apps	(Gls)
2017–2020	Jiangsu Suning	0	(0)
2019	→ Zibo Cuju (loan)	13	(1)
2021	Nantong Zhiyun	3	(0)
2022–2024	Suzhou Dongwu	40	(3)
2024	Quanzhou Yassin	8	(0)
2025–	Wuxi Wugo	24	(0)
- * Club domestic league appearances and goals as of 14:01, 25 September 2026 (UTC)

Xie Xiaofan (Chinese: 谢小凡; born 15 March 1998) is a Chinese footballer currently playing as a left-back or left winger for Wuxi Wugo.

== Club career ==
Xie Xiaofan was promoted to the senior team of top-tier club Jiangsu Suning before the 2017 Chinese Super League campaign. He was loaned out to third tier club Zibo Cuju on 25 February 2019. On his return to his parent club he was part of the squad that won the 2020 Chinese Super League title. On 28 February 2021, the parent company of Jiangsu, Suning Holdings Group announced that operations were going to cease immediately due to financial difficulties.

On 31 March 2021, Xie joined second-tier club Nantong Zhiyun for the 2021 China League One campaign on a free transfer. He made his debut for the club in a league game on 18 September 2021 against Xinjiang Tianshan Leopard in a 3-0 victory. In the following season he transferred to fellow second-tier club Suzhou Dongwu and made his debut in a league game for them on 17 August 2022 against Qingdao Hainiu in a 2-1 defeat.

== Career statistics ==
As of 25 September 2026.

Club	Season	League			Cup		Continental		Other		Total	
Club	Season	Division	Apps	Goals	Apps	Goals	Apps	Goals	Apps	Goals	Apps	Goals
Jiangsu Suning	2017	Chinese Super League	0	0	0	0	0	0	0 (Note: Appearances in Chinese FA Super Cup)	0	0	0
Jiangsu Suning	2018	Chinese Super League	0	0	0	0	-		-		0	0
Jiangsu Suning	2019	Chinese Super League	0	0	0	0	-		-		0	0
Jiangsu Suning	2020	Chinese Super League	0	0	0	0	-		-		0	0
Jiangsu Suning	Total		0	0	0	0	0	0	0	0	0	0
Zibo Cuju (loan)	2019	China League Two	13	1	3	0	-		-		16	1
Nantong Zhiyun	2021	China League One	3	0	1	0	-		-		4	0
Suzhou Dongwu	2022	China League One	16	2	2	0	-		-		18	2
Suzhou Dongwu	2023	China League One	23	1	1	0	-		-		24	1
Suzhou Dongwu	2024	China League One	1	0	1	0	-		-		2	0
Suzhou Dongwu	Total		40	3	4	0	0	0	0	0	44	3
Quanzhou Yassin	2024	China League Two	8	0	0	0	-		-		8	0
Wuxi Wugo	2025	China League Two	13	0	0	0	-		-		13	0
Wuxi Wugo	2026	China League One	11	0	0	0	-		-		11	0
Wuxi Wugo	Total		24	0	0	0	0	0	0	0	24	0
Career total			88	4	8	0	0	0	0	0	96	4

== Honours ==
=== Club ===
Jiangsu Suning

- Chinese Super League: 2020.
