= Huang Zhun =

Huang Zhun may refer to:

- Zhun Huang (composer) (1926–2024), Chinese composer of film soundtracks
- Huang Zhun (footballer) (born 1989), Chinese footballer
