= Peng Peng =

Chinese footballer

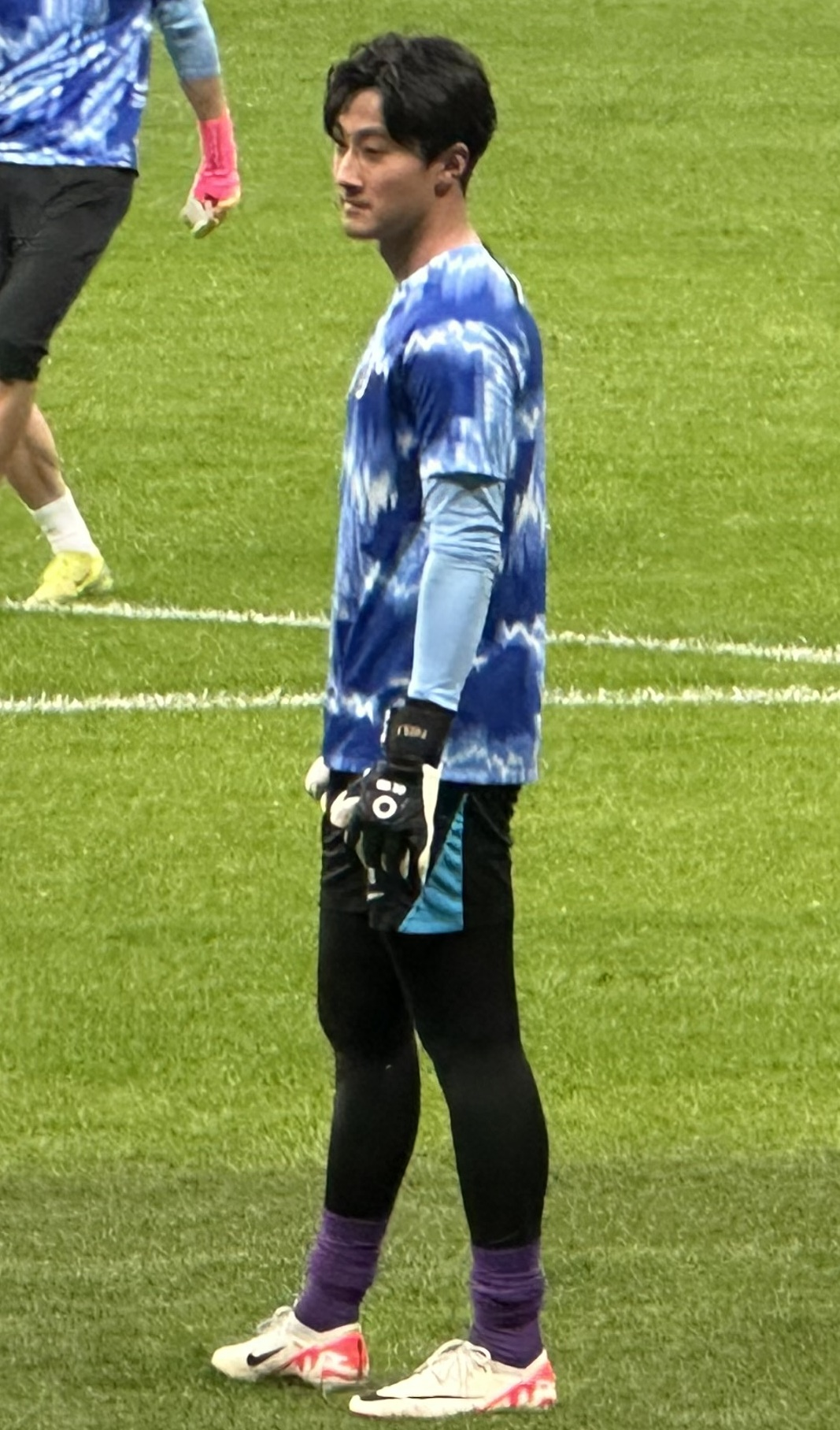
- Peng Peng in May 2025

Personal information
- Date of birth: 24 November 2000 (age 25)
- Place of birth: Shenzhen, Guangdong, China
- Height: 1.85 m (6 ft 1 in)
- Position: Goalkeeper

Team information
- Current team: Shenzhen Peng City
- Number: 13

Youth career
- –2018: Genbao Football Base
- 2018–2019: Shanghai Shenhua

Senior career*
Years	Team	Apps	(Gls)
2019–2020	Shanghai Shenhua	0	(0)
2019	→ Shanghai Shenxin (loan)	9	(0)
2019	→ Qingdao Huanghai (loan)	2	(0)
2020–2022	Kunshan FC	68	(0)
2023	Henan FC	2	(0)
2024–	Shenzhen Peng City	49	(0)

International career^{‡}
2018	China U19	8	(0)
2022	China U23	1	(0)
Medal record
Representing China
Men's football
EAFF Championship
Bronze medal – third place	2022 Japan	Team
- * Club domestic league appearances and goals as of 22 November 2026 ‡ National team caps and goals as of 14:01, 24 August 2021 (UTC)

Peng Peng (Chinese: 彭鹏; born 24 November 2000) is a Chinese professional footballer currently playing as a goalkeeper for Shenzhen Peng City.

== Club career ==
Peng joined Shanghai Shenhua's youth academy in 2018 after the club bought Genbao Football Base's under-19 players. He would be loaned out to second tier club Shanghai Shenxin for the 2019 China League One season, where he would make his professional debut on 9 March 2019 against Changchun Yatai in a 4-1 defeat. His loan was terminated early and he subsequently joined another second tier club in Qingdao Huanghai on 19 July 2019. His season would end early after he broke his toe after only his second appearance for the team, however despite his small contribution he was part of the team achieved promotion to the Chinese Super League at the end of the season.

On 8 January 2020, Peng joined China League Two club Kunshan permanently. The team would eventually receive a late promotion and participated the 2020 China League One following the disbandment of Tianjin Tianhai. Peng would make his debut in a league game on 13 September 2020 against Sichuan Jiuniu in a 2-0 victory. He would go on to take the opportunity to establish himself as a vital member within the team that won the division and promotion to the top tier at the end of the 2022 China League One campaign.

== Career statistics ==
As of match played 30 May 2026.

Appearances and goals by club, season and competition
Club	Season	League			Cup		Continental		Other		Total	
Club	Season	Division	Apps	Goals	Apps	Goals	Apps	Goals	Apps	Goals	Apps	Goals
Shanghai Shenhua	2019	Chinese Super League	0	0	0	0	-		-		0	0
Shanghai Shenhua	2020	Chinese Super League	0	0	0	0	-		-		0	0
Shanghai Shenhua	Total		0	0	0	0	0	0	0	0	0	0
Shanghai Shenxin (loan)	2019	China League One	9	0	1	0	-		-		10	0
Qingdao Huanghai (loan)	2019	China League One	2	0	0	0	-		-		2	0
Kunshan	2020	China League One	14	0	2	0	-		-		16	0
Kunshan	2021	China League One	30	0	0	0	-		-		30	0
Kunshan	2022	China League One	24	0	1	0	-		-		25	0
Kunshan	Total		68	0	3	0	0	0	0	0	71	0
Henan	2023	Chinese Super League	2	0	2	0	-		-		4	0
Shenzhen Peng City	2024	Chinese Super League	17	0	0	0	-		-		17	0
Shenzhen Peng City	2025	Chinese Super League	8	0	0	0	-		-		8	0
Shenzhen Peng City	2026	Chinese Super League	10	0	0	0	-		-		10	0
Shenzhen Peng City	Total		35	0	0	0	0	0	0	0	35	0
Career total			116	0	6	0	0	0	0	0	122	0

== Honours ==
=== Club ===
Qingdao Huanghai

- China League One: 2019

Kunshan

- China League One: 2022
