= Yoon Jun-sung =

South Korean footballer (born 1989)

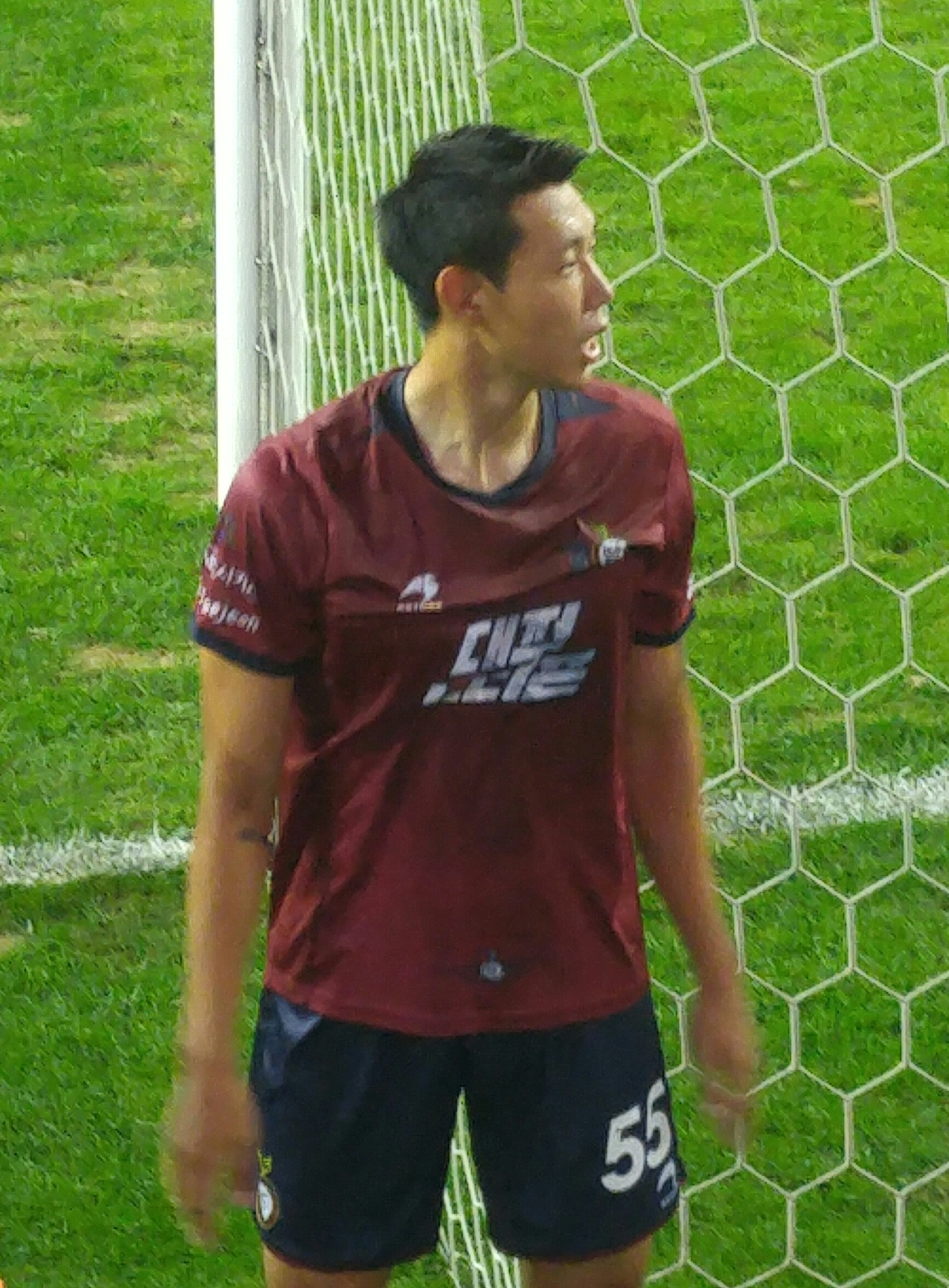

Personal information
- Full name: Yoon Jun-sung
- Date of birth: 28 September 1989 (age 37)
- Place of birth: South Korea
- Height: 1.88 m (6 ft 2 in)
- Position: Defender

Team information
- Current team: Nantong Zhiyun (assistant coach)

Youth career
- 2008–2011: Kyung Hee University

Senior career*
Years	Team	Apps	(Gls)
2012–2014	Pohang Steelers	13	(0)
2015–2018	Daejeon Citizen	39	(1)
2016–2017	→ Sangju Sangmu (army)	26	(0)
2019	Suwon FC	21	(0)
2020	Nakhon Ratchasima	7	(0)
2021-2023	FC Anyang	9	(0)

Managerial career
- 2024-2025: Suzhou Dongwu (fitness)
- 2025-: Nantong Zhiyun (assistant)
- * Club domestic league appearances and goals as of 16 February 2022

Yoon Jun-sung (Korean: 윤준성; born 28 September 1989) is a South Korean football coach and retired footballer who played as a defender.

== Career ==
Yoon was selected by Pohang Steelers in 2012 K League draft.

He moved to Daejeon Citizen in January 2015.
