= Meng Junjie =

Chinese association football player

Personal information
- Date of birth: 22 April 2001 (age 25)
- Place of birth: Chengdu, Sichuan, China
- Height: 1.76 m (5 ft 9 in)
- Position: Forward

Team information
- Current team: Wuxi Wugo, (on loan from Nantong Zhiyun)
- Number: 18

Youth career
- –2020: Chengdu Foreign Languages School

Senior career*
| Years | Team | Apps | (Gls) |
| 2020–2025 | Chengdu Rongcheng | 17 | (3) |
| 2025 | Chengdu Rongcheng B | 19 | (6) |
| 2025– | Nantong Zhiyun | 11 | (0) |
| 2026– | → Wuxi Wugo (loan) | 0 | (0) |
- * Club domestic league appearances and goals as of 9 March 2026

Meng Junjie (Chinese: 孟俊杰; born 22 April 2001) is a Chinese footballer currently playing as a forward for Wuxi Wugo, on loan from Nantong Zhiyun.

== Club career ==
Meng Junjie was promoted to the senior team of Chengdu Rongcheng within the 2020 China League One season and would make his debut in a league game on 10 October 2020 against Suzhou Dongwu in a 1-0 victory. He would be a regular part of the team as the club gained promotion to the top tier at the end of the 2021 league campaign.

On 18 July 2025, Meng transferred to China League One club Nantong Zhiyun.

On 1 July 2026, Meng was loaned to China League One club Wuxi Wugo.

== Career statistics ==
As of 8 January 2023.

| Club | Season | League | | | Cup | | Continental | | Other | | Total | |
| Club | Season | Division | Apps | Goals | Apps | Goals | Apps | Goals | Apps | Goals | Apps | Goals |
|---|---|---|---|---|---|---|---|---|---|---|---|---|
| Chengdu Rongcheng | 2020 | China League One | 1 | 0 | 0 | 0 | – | | – | | 1 | 0 |
| Chengdu Rongcheng | 2021 | China League One | 5 | 3 | 0 | 0 | – | | 0 (Note: Appearance(s) in CSL Relegation play-offs) | 0 | 5 | 3 |
| Chengdu Rongcheng | 2022 | Chinese Super League | 11 | 0 | 3 | 0 | – | | – | | 14 | 0 |
| Chengdu Rongcheng | Total | | 17 | 3 | 3 | 0 | 0 | 0 | 0 | 0 | 20 | 3 |
| Career total | | | 17 | 3 | 3 | 0 | 0 | 0 | 0 | 0 | 20 | 3 |
