= Tao Hongliang =

Chinese association football player

Personal information
- Date of birth: 17 February 1997 (age 29)
- Height: 1.76 m (5 ft 9 in)
- Position: Midfielder

Team information
- Current team: Zibo Qisheng

Youth career
- –2017: Shandong Luneng
- 2017–2018: Stabæk

Senior career*
Years	Team	Apps	(Gls)
2017–2018	Stabæk II	18	(0)
2017–2018	Stabæk	1	(0)
2019–2020	Taizhou Yuanda	10	(0)
2021	Nantong Zhiyun	5	(0)
2022-	Zibo Qisheng	0	(0)
- * Club domestic league appearances and goals as of 16:34, 6 May 2022 (UTC)

Tao Hongliang (Chinese: 陶洪亮; born 17 February 1997) is a Chinese footballer currently playing as a midfielder for Zibo Qisheng in China League Two.

== Club career ==
Tao Hongliang would play for the Shandong Luneng youth team before going abroad to join Norwegian football club Stabæk. He would be promoted to the senior team where on 27 November 2017 he would make his debut for them in a league game against Viking that ended in a 2-0 defeat, his appearance would make him the first Chinese person to play in the Norwegian league.

On 8 July 2019, Tao would return to China and join third tier football club Taizhou Yuanda. In his first season with the club he would aid the club to a third place finish and gain promotion to the second tier.

== Career statistics ==
As of 31 December 2020.

Club	Season	League			Cup		Other		Total	
Club	Season	Division	Apps	Goals	Apps	Goals	Apps	Goals	Apps	Goals
Stabæk II	2017	3. divisjon	8	0	–		0	0	8	0
Stabæk II	2018	2. divisjon	10	0	–		0	0	10	0
Stabæk II	Total		18	0	0	0	0	0	18	0
Stabæk	2017	Eliteserien	1	0	0	0	0	0	1	0
Stabæk	2018	Eliteserien	0	0	0	0	0	0	0	0
Stabæk	Total		1	0	0	0	0	0	1	0
Taizhou Yuanda	2019	China League Two	1	0	0	0	0	0	1	0
Taizhou Yuanda	2020	China League One	9	0	0	0	0	0	9	0
Taizhou Yuanda	Total		10	0	0	0	0	0	10	0
Career total			29	0	0	0	0	0	29	0
