= Zhang Wu =

Chinese footballer

Personal information
- Date of birth: 17 August 1993 (age 33)
- Place of birth: Liaoning, China
- Height: 1.80 m (5 ft 11 in)
- Position: Midfielder

Team information
- Current team: Wuxi Wugou

Youth career
- –2014: Tianjin TEDA

Senior career*
Years	Team	Apps	(Gls)
2014	Tianjin TEDA	0	(0)
2017–2018	Temnić 1924	8	(0)
2018–2019	Trayal	1	(0)
2019–2020	Inner Mongolia Caoshangfei	21	(3)
2021	Liaoning Shenyang Urban	19	(0)
2022-	Wuxi Wugou	0	(0)
- * Club domestic league appearances and goals as of 06:54, 29 April 2022 (UTC)

Zhang Wu (simplified Chinese: 张午; traditional Chinese: 張午; pinyin: Zhāng Wǔ; born 17 August 1993) is a Chinese footballer currently playing as a midfielder for Wuxi Wugou in the China League Two.

== Career statistics ==
=== Club ===
As of 21 January 2020.

Club	Season	League			Cup		Continental		Other		Total	
Club	Season	Division	Apps	Goals	Apps	Goals	Apps	Goals	Apps	Goals	Apps	Goals
Tianjin TEDA	2014	Chinese Super League	0	0	0	0	–		0	0	0	0
Temnić 1924	2017–18	Serbian First League	8	0	0	0	–		0	0	8	0
Trayal	2018–19	Serbian First League	1	0	0	0	–		0	0	1	0
Inner Mongolia Caoshangfei	2019	China League Two	4	0	0	0	–		2 (Note: Appearances in the China League Two relegation play-offs)	0	6	0
Career total			13	0	0	0	0	0	2	0	15	0
