= Ruan Yang =

Chinese footballer (born 1993)

Ruan Yang 阮杨
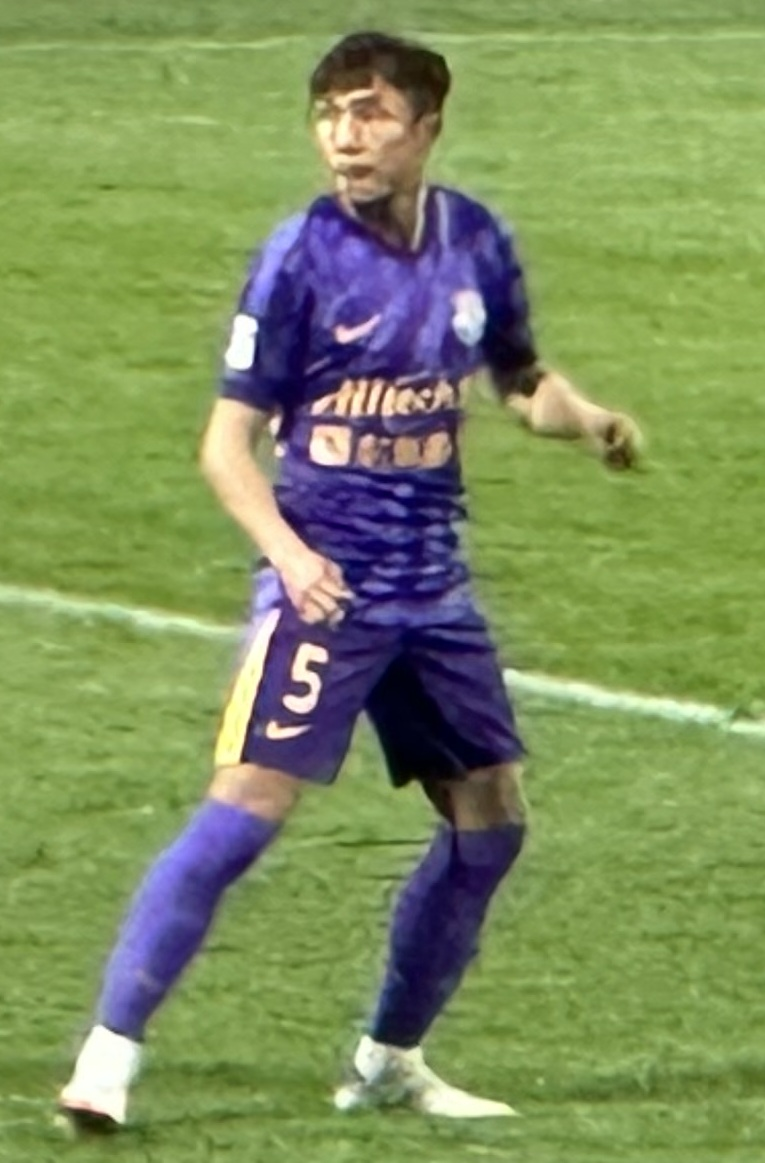
- Ruan in 2025

Personal information
- Date of birth: 13 December 1993 (age 32)
- Place of birth: Hangzhou, Zhejiang, China
- Height: 1.70 m (5 ft 7 in)
- Position: Right winger

Team information
- Current team: Nantong Zhiyun
- Number: 11

Youth career
- 2008–2010: Hangzhou Greentown
- 2011–2012: Real SC

Senior career*
Years	Team	Apps	(Gls)
2011	Wenzhou Provenza	15	(5)
2012–2013	Sporting CP B	1	(0)
2013	→ Amora (loan)	3	(1)
2013–2017	Hangzhou Greentown	0	(0)
2018–2019	Hunan Billows	36	(7)
2019–2022	Kunshan FC	89	(14)
2023	Yunnan Yukun	8	(0)
2023	Nantong Zhiyun	10	(1)
2024	Shenzhen Peng City	11	(0)
2025	Tianjin Jinmen Tiger	9	(0)
2026–	Nantong Zhiyun	0	(0)
- * Club domestic league appearances and goals as of 26 August 2025

Ruan Yang (Chinese: 阮杨; born 13 December 1993) is a Chinese footballer who plays as a right winger for Nantong Zhiyun.

== Career ==
Ruan Yang was born in Hangzhou, China. He started his football career when he joined Hangzhou Greentown's youth academy in 2008. After joining the academy, he was sent to the clubs reserve team Wenzhou Provenza who were allowed to play in the Chinese football pyramid before being one of the players in the football star project and went to Portugal for football training in 2011. He arrived in Portugal on 16 December 2011, he played for Real SC's youth team alongside Li Yuanyi in the 2011–12 season. In the summer of 2012, he trained with Sporting CP B and signed a contract to play for the team. Ruan made his first appearance for Sporting CP B on 6 December 2012, coming on as a substitute in a 3–2 loss against Uniao Madeira. In the winter of 2013, he was loaned to low tier club Amora. He played three games and scored one goal before he returned to China in March 2013. Ruan then signed with Chinese Super League side Hangzhou Greentown on 1 July 2013.

At Hangzhou, Ruan would struggle to gain much playing time and was even dropped to the reserves before he transferred to League Two side Hunan Billows on 9 March 2018. He would transfer to another third tier club in Kunshan FC and be part of the team that gained promotion to the second tier at the end of the 2019 China League Two campaign. He would go on to establish himself as regular within the team and was part of the squad that won the division and promotion to the top tier at the end of the 2022 China League One campaign.

On 1 March 2026, Yuan returned to Nantong Zhiyun for the 2026 season.

== Career statistics ==
As of 25 December 2022.

Appearances and goals by club, season and competition
Club	Season	League			National cup		Continental		Other		Total	
Club	Season	Division	Apps	Goals	Apps	Goals	Apps	Goals	Apps	Goals	Apps	Goals
Wenzhou Provenza	2011	China League Two	15	5	–		–		–		15	5
Sporting CP B	2012–13	Segunda Liga	1	0	–		–		–		1	0
Amora (loan)	2013	Terceira Divisão	3	1	0	0	–		–		3	1
Hangzhou Greentown	2013	Chinese Super League	0	0	0	0	–		–		0	0
Hangzhou Greentown	2014	Chinese Super League	0	0	1	1	–		–		1	1
Hangzhou Greentown	2015	Chinese Super League	0	0	1	0	–		–		1	0
Hangzhou Greentown	Total		0	0	2	1	0	0	0	0	2	1
Hunan Billows	2018	China League Two	24	2	2	0	–		–		26	2
Hunan Billows	2019	China League Two	12	5	2	0	–		–		30	0
Hunan Billows	Total		36	7	4	0	0	0	0	0	40	7
Kunshan FC	2019	China League Two	12	3	0	0	–		–		12	3
Kunshan FC	2020	China League One	15	2	2	0	–		–		17	2
Kunshan FC	2021	China League One	32	5	0	0	–		–		32	5
Kunshan FC	2022	China League One	30	4	0	0	–		–		30	4
Kunshan FC	Total		89	14	2	0	0	0	0	0	91	14
Career total			144	27	8	1	0	0	0	0	152	28

== Honours ==
Kunshan FC

- China League One: 2022
