= Li Yuanyi =

Chinese footballer

Li Yuanyi 李源一
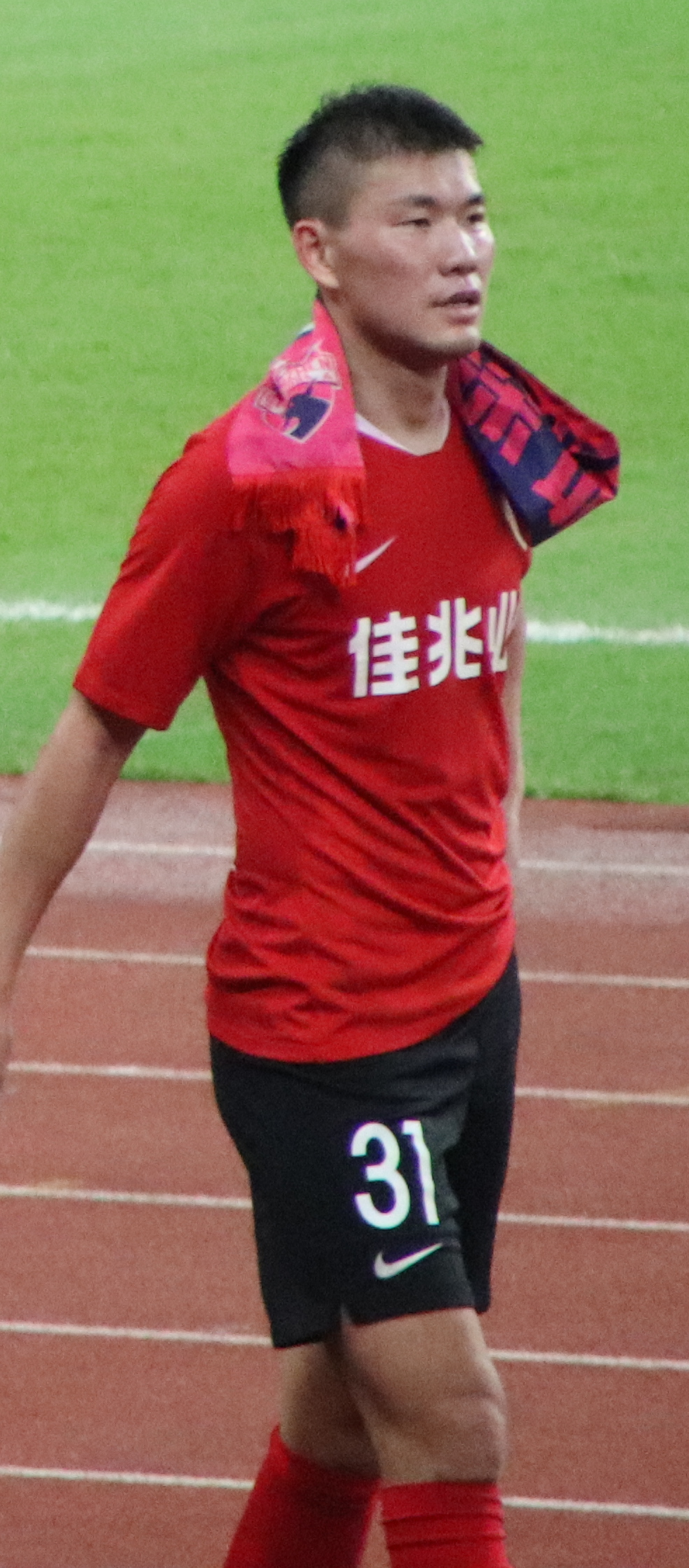

Personal information
- Date of birth: 28 August 1993 (age 33)
- Place of birth: Zhongjiang, Sichuan, China
- Height: 1.80 m (5 ft 11 in)
- Position: Midfielder

Team information
- Current team: Shandong Taishan
- Number: 22

Youth career
- 2004–2006: Mingyu Football School
- 2007–2013: Tianjin Teda
- 2010–2011: → Arsenal (loan)
- 2011–2012: → Real SC (loan)

Senior career*
Years	Team	Apps	(Gls)
2012–2013	Casa Pia	15	(4)
2013–2015	Boavista	19	(2)
2014–2015	→ Leixões (loan)	29	(2)
2016	Guangzhou Evergrande	4	(0)
2016	→ Tianjin Teda (loan)	8	(1)
2017–2018	Tianjin Teda	51	(6)
2019–2022	Shenzhen FC	97	(5)
2023–	Shandong Taishan	93	(6)

International career^{‡}
2013–2014	China U-19	9	(5)
2014–2016	China U-23	11	(2)
2024–	China	9	(0)
- * Club domestic league appearances and goals as of 19 November 2026 ‡ National team caps and goals as of 21 March 2024

Li Yuanyi (Chinese: 李源一; pinyin: Lǐ Yuányī; born 28 August 1993) is a Chinese professional footballer who plays for Chinese Super League club Shandong Taishan and the China national team.

== Club career ==
=== Youth ===
Li started his football career when he received organized football training at Mingyu Football School, later joining Tianjin Teda's youth academy in 2007. He soon gained a loan spell to English Premier League side Arsenal's academy for further training under a cooperation project between Nike and the Football Association in 2010. Afterwards, Li went to Portugal as a part of the Chinese Football Association's 500.com Stars Project in 2011. He arrived in Portugal on 16 December 2011 and played for Real SC's youth academy alongside Ruan Yang.

=== Casa Pia ===
In July 2012, Li transferred to second tier Segunda Divisão side Casa Pia. He made his debut on 28 October 2012 for the club in a 2–1 lost against Oriental, coming on as a substitute for André Oliveira in the 34th minute; however, he was sent off after receiving two successive yellow cards in the 56th and 58th minute in his debut match. He gradually became a starter within the team and scored his first goal for the club on 13 January 2013 in a 1–1 draw against Carregado. He made 15 league appearances and scored four goals in the 2012–13 season.

=== Boavista ===
On 23 August 2013, Li transferred to another Segunda Divisão club Boavista on a free transfer. However, his former club, Tianjin claimed that Li was still under the contract with Tianjin and refused to acknowledge the transfer, but the dispute was quickly resolved. He made his debut for the club on 15 September 2013 in a 1–0 win against Coimbrões, coming on as a substitute for João Beirão in the 82nd minute. He scored his first goal for the club on 6 October 2013 in a 2–0 win against Perafita.

==== Leixões (loan) ====
On 7 August 2014, after Boavista returned to the top flight Primeira Liga, Li was loaned out to Segunda Liga side Leixões. He made his debut for the club on 13 September 2014 in a 2–1 win against Aves, coming on as a substitute for Leandro Augusto in the 70th minute. He extended his loan deal with Leixões for one season on 6 July 2015.

=== Guangzhou Evergrande ===
On 16 July 2015, Li transferred to Chinese Super League side Guangzhou Evergrande; however, he remained with Leixões to fulfill his loan deal before joining Guangzhou in December 2015. He made his debut for the club on 19 April 2016 in a 2-0 away win against Korean club Pohang Steelers in the 2015 AFC Champions League, coming on as a substitute for Ricardo Goulart in the 53rd minute.

=== Tianjin Teda ===
On 15 July 2016, Li was loaned to fellow top tier side Tianjin Teda until 31 December 2016. He made his debut and scored his first goal for the club on 23 July 2016 in a 3–1 away lost to Hangzhou Greentown. In February 2017, Li permanently transferred to Tianjin Teda.

=== Shenzhen ===
On 27 February 2019, Li transferred to fellow top tier side Shenzhen. He would go on to make his debut for Shenzhen in a 3–1 home victory against Hebei China Fortune on 2 March 2019.

=== Shandong Taishan ===
On 11 April 2023, Li joined fellow Chinese Super League club Shandong Taishan. On 25 April 2023, he made his Taishan debut in a 2–1 home win against Zhejiang. On 30 July 2023, he scored his first goal for Taishan in a 3–0 home win against Beijing Guoan.

== International career ==
On 21 March 2024, Li made his international debut in a 2–2 away draw against Singapore in the 2026 FIFA World Cup qualification. On 26 March 2024, Li was shown a straight red card in his second international game, a 4-1 home win against Singapore in the 2026 FIFA World Cup qualification.

== Career statistics ==
As of 13 March 2024.

Appearances and goals by club, season and competition
Club	Season	League			National cup		League cup		Continental		Other		Total	
Club	Season	Division	Apps	Goals	Apps	Goals	Apps	Goals	Apps	Goals	Apps	Goals	Apps	Goals
Casa Pia	2012–13	Segunda Divisão	15	4	0	0	–		–		–		15	4
Boavista	2013–14	Campeonato Nacional	19	2	1	0	–		–		–		20	2
Leixões (loan)	2014–15	Segunda Liga	16	1	0	0	0	0	–		–		16	1
Leixões (loan)	2015–16	Segunda Liga	13	1	1	0	0	0	–		–		14	1
Leixões (loan)	Total		29	2	1	0	0	0	0	0	0	0	30	2
Guangzhou Evergrande	2016	Chinese Super League	2	0	0	0	–		2	0	0 (Note: Appearances in Chinese FA Super Cup)	0	4	0
Tianjin Teda (loan)	2016	Chinese Super League	8	1	0	0	–		–		–		8	1
Tianjin Teda	2017	Chinese Super League	25	4	2	0	–		–		–		27	4
Tianjin Teda	2018	Chinese Super League	23	2	2	0	–		–		–		25	2
Tianjin Teda	Total		56	7	4	0	0	0	0	0	0	0	60	7
Shenzhen	2019	Chinese Super League	30	1	0	0	–		–		–		30	1
Shenzhen	2020	Chinese Super League	16	0	1	0	–		–		–		17	1
Shenzhen	2021	Chinese Super League	19	3	4	0	–		–		–		23	3
Shenzhen	2022	Chinese Super League	26	1	0	0	–		–		–		26	1
Shenzhen	Total		91	5	5	0	0	0	0	0	0	0	96	5
Shandong Taishan	2023	Chinese Super League	25	2	4	0	–		9	1	–		38	3
Shandong Taishan	2024	Chinese Super League	2	0	0	0	–		–		–		2	0
Shandong Taishan	Total		27	2	4	0	0	0	9	1	0	0	40	3
Career total			239	22	15	0	0	0	11	1	0	0	265	23

== Honours ==
Guangzhou Evergrande

- Chinese FA Super Cup: 2016
