= Zhang Yudong =

Chinese footballer

Zhang Yudong 张煜东
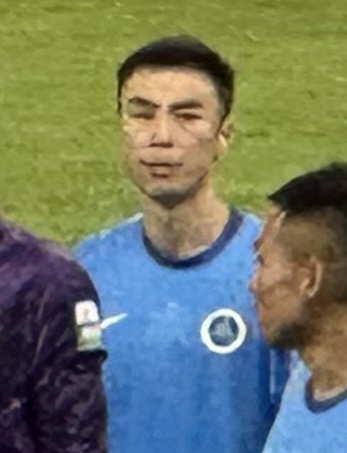
- Zhang Yudong in April 2025

Personal information
- Date of birth: September 9, 1992 (age 34)
- Place of birth: Shanghai, China
- Height: 1.80 m (5 ft 11 in)
- Position: Midfielder

Team information
- Current team: Shijiazhuang Gongfu
- Number: 28

Youth career
- Genbao Football Academy

Senior career*
| Years | Team | Apps | (Gls) |
| 2009–2011 | Shanghai East Asia | 0 | (0) |
| 2012–2019 | Shanghai Shenxin | 93 | (2) |
| 2019–2022 | Kunshan FC | 93 | (7) |
| 2023–2025 | Shenzhen Peng City | 74 | (5) |
| 2026– | Shijiazhuang Gongfu | 0 | (0) |
- * Club domestic league appearances and goals as of 28 August 2025

Zhang Yudong (Chinese: 张煜东; born 9 September 1992 in Shanghai) is a Chinese football player who currently plays as a midfielder for Shijiazhuang Gongfu.

== Club career ==
Born in Shanghai, Zhang joined Genbao Football Academy. He was promoted to academy's first team Shanghai East Asia in 2009. In January 2012, Zhang transferred to Chinese Super League side Shanghai Shenxin. He made his league debut for Shanghai on 27 April 2012 in a game against Beijing Guoan, coming on as a substitute for Wang Yun in the 78th minute. Unfortunately he go on to also be part of the team that were relegated at the end of the 2015 Chinese Super League. After several seasons he moved to third-tier club Kunshan FC and was part of the team that gained promotion to the second tier at the end of the 2019 China League Two campaign. He would go on to establish himself as regular within the team and was part of the squad that won the division and promotion to the top tier at the end of the 2022 China League One campaign.

== Career statistics ==
As of match played 31 December 2024

Appearances and goals by club, season and competition
| Club | Season | League | | | National Cup | | Continental | | Other | | Total | |
| Club | Season | Division | Apps | Goals | Apps | Goals | Apps | Goals | Apps | Goals | Apps | Goals |
|---|---|---|---|---|---|---|---|---|---|---|---|---|
| Shanghai East Asia | 2009 | China League One | 0 | 0 | - | | - | | - | | 0 | 0 |
| Shanghai East Asia | 2010 | China League One | 0 | 0 | - | | - | | - | | 0 | 0 |
| Shanghai East Asia | 2011 | China League One | 0 | 0 | 0 | 0 | - | | - | | 0 | 0 |
| Shanghai East Asia | Total | | 0 | 0 | 0 | 0 | 0 | 0 | 0 | 0 | 0 | 0 |
| Shanghai Shenxin | 2012 | Chinese Super League | 2 | 0 | 1 | 0 | - | | - | | 3 | 0 |
| Shanghai Shenxin | 2013 | Chinese Super League | 3 | 0 | 2 | 0 | - | | - | | 5 | 0 |
| Shanghai Shenxin | 2014 | Chinese Super League | 7 | 0 | 2 | 0 | - | | - | | 9 | 0 |
| Shanghai Shenxin | 2015 | Chinese Super League | 1 | 1 | 1 | 0 | - | | - | | 2 | 1 |
| Shanghai Shenxin | 2016 | China League One | 17 | 0 | 3 | 0 | - | | - | | 20 | 0 |
| Shanghai Shenxin | 2017 | China League One | 27 | 0 | 5 | 0 | - | | - | | 32 | 0 |
| Shanghai Shenxin | 2018 | China League One | 28 | 1 | 0 | 0 | - | | - | | 28 | 1 |
| Shanghai Shenxin | 2019 | China League One | 8 | 0 | 3 | 0 | - | | - | | 11 | 0 |
| Shanghai Shenxin | Total | | 93 | 2 | 17 | 0 | 0 | 0 | 0 | 0 | 110 | 2 |
| Kunshan FC | 2019 | China League Two | 16 | 1 | 0 | 0 | - | | - | | 16 | 1 |
| Kunshan FC | 2020 | China League One | 13 | 0 | 2 | 0 | - | | - | | 15 | 0 |
| Kunshan FC | 2021 | China League One | 32 | 2 | 1 | 0 | - | | - | | 33 | 2 |
| Kunshan FC | 2022 | China League One | 32 | 4 | 1 | 0 | - | | - | | 33 | 4 |
| Kunshan FC | Total | | 93 | 7 | 4 | 0 | 0 | 0 | 0 | 0 | 97 | 7 |
| Sichuan Jiuniu/ Shenzhen Peng City | 2023 | China League One | 26 | 3 | 0 | 0 | - | | - | | 26 | 3 |
| Sichuan Jiuniu/ Shenzhen Peng City | 2024 | Chinese Super League | 23 | 0 | 1 | 0 | - | | - | | 24 | 0 |
| Sichuan Jiuniu/ Shenzhen Peng City | Total | | 49 | 3 | 1 | 0 | 0 | 0 | 0 | 0 | 50 | 3 |
| Career total | | | 235 | 12 | 22 | 0 | 0 | 0 | 0 | 0 | 257 | 12 |

== Honours ==
Kunshan

- China League One: 2022
