= Hu Mingfei =

Chinese footballer

Hu Mingfei 胡鸣飞
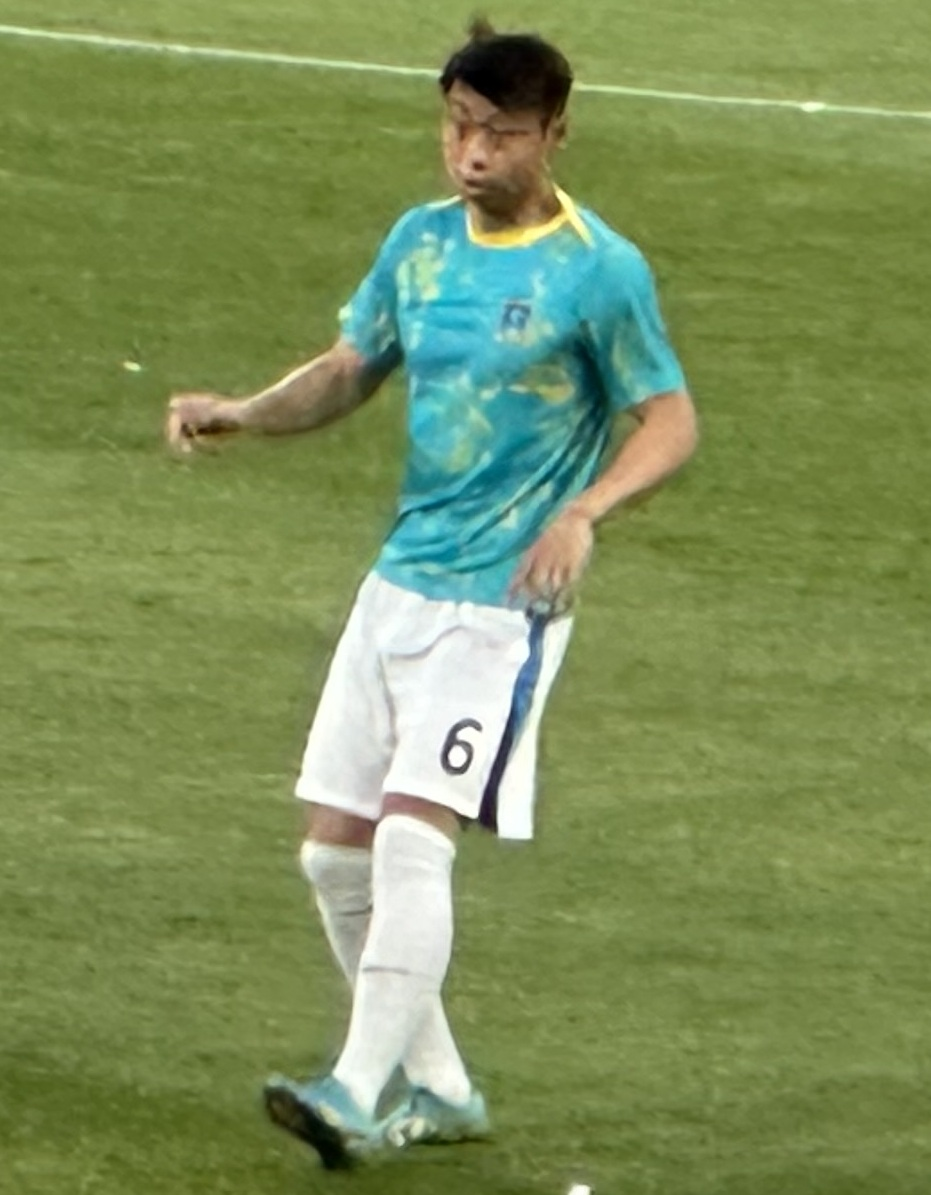
- Hu Mingfei in May 2025

Personal information
- Full name: Hu Mingfei
- Date of birth: 24 February 1993 (age 33)
- Place of birth: Zhenjiang, Jiangsu, China
- Height: 1.82 m (6 ft 0 in)
- Position: Defender

Team information
- Current team: Nantong Zhiyun
- Number: 6

Youth career
- Jiangsu Youth
- 2014: Shanghai Shenxin

Senior career*
Years	Team	Apps	(Gls)
2011–2012	Jiangsu Youth	19	(0)
2015–2018	Shanghai Shenxin	36	(1)
2019–2023	Suzhou Dongwu	126	(9)
2024	Guangxi Pingguo	20	(2)
2025–	Nantong Zhiyun	25	(2)
- * Club domestic league appearances and goals as of 9 March 2026

Hu Mingfei (Chinese: 胡鸣飞; pinyin: Hú Míngfēi; born 24 February 1993, in Zhenjiang) is a Chinese footballer who currently plays for Nantong Zhiyun in the China League One.

== Club career ==
Hu Mingfei started his professional football career in 2011 when he joined Jiangsu Youth for the 2011 China League Two campaign. Failing to join Jiangsu Sainty, he moved to another Chinese Super League club Shanghai Shenxin in January 2014 after impressing on trial. Hu was promoted to Shanghai Shenxin first team squad in 2015. On 11 April 2015, he made his Super League debut in a 2–1 away defeat against Shijiazhuang Ever Bright, coming on as a substitute for Chi Zhongguo in the 91st minute. He was sent to the Shenxin reserved team in 2018.

On 21 February 2019, Hu transferred to League Two side Suzhou Dongwu.

== Career statistics ==
Statistics accurate as of match played 31 December 2022.

Appearances and goals by club, season and competition
Club	Season	League			National Cup		Continental		Other		Total	
Club	Season	Division	Apps	Goals	Apps	Goals	Apps	Goals	Apps	Goals	Apps	Goals
Jiangsu Youth	2011	China League Two	13	0	-		-		-		13	0
Jiangsu Youth	2012	China League Two	6	0	-		-		-		6	0
Jiangsu Youth	Total		19	0	0	0	0	0	0	0	19	0
Shanghai Shenxin	2015	Chinese Super League	16	1	1	0	-		-		17	0
Shanghai Shenxin	2016	China League One	14	0	1	0	-		-		15	0
Shanghai Shenxin	2017	China League One	6	0	5	0	-		-		11	0
Shanghai Shenxin	Total		36	1	7	0	0	0	0	0	43	1
Suzhou Dongwu	2019	China League Two	32	2	1	0	-		1 (Note: Appearance(s) in CL1 Relegation play-offs)	0	34	2
Suzhou Dongwu	2020	China League One	13	0	1	0	-		-		14	0
Suzhou Dongwu	2021	China League One	29	3	1	0	-		-		30	3
Suzhou Dongwu	2022	China League One	30	2	1	0	-		-		31	2
Suzhou Dongwu	Total		104	7	4	0	0	0	1	0	109	7
Career total			159	8	11	0	0	0	1	0	171	8
