= Geng Xiaoshun =

Chinese footballer

Geng Xiaoshun 耿晓顺
Personal information
- Date of birth: May 17, 1990 (age 36)
- Place of birth: Liaoyang, Liaoning, China
- Height: 1.86 m (6 ft 1 in)
- Position: Defender

Team information
- Current team: Dalian Kun City
- Number: 2

Senior career*
Years	Team	Apps	(Gls)
2011–2017	Shenzhen Ruby	116	(4)
2018–2019	Jiangsu Yancheng Dingli	29	(0)
2019–2022	Sichuan Jiuniu	85	(1)
2024-	Dalian Kun City	1	(0)
- * Club domestic league appearances and goals as of 31 December 2020

Geng Xiaoshun (Chinese: 耿晓顺; born 17 May 1990 in Liaoning), former name Li Yang (Chinese: 李洋 before 28 February 1991) is a Chinese football player who currently plays for China League Two side Dalian Kun City.

On 10 September 2024, Chinese Football Association announced that Geng was banned from football-related activities for lifetime for involving in match-fixing.

== Club career ==
In 2011, Geng Xiaoshun (Li Yang) started his professional footballer career with Shenzhen Ruby in the Chinese Super League. He would eventually make his league debut for Shenzhen on 10 April 2011 in a game against Shaanxi Chanba, coming on as a substitute for Janez Zavrl in the 46th minute.

In March 2018, Geng transferred to China League Two side Jiangsu Yancheng Dingli.

== Career statistics ==
Statistics accurate as of match played 31 December 2020.

Appearances and goals by club, season and competition
Club	Season	League			National Cup		Continental		Other		Total	
Club	Season	Division	Apps	Goals	Apps	Goals	Apps	Goals	Apps	Goals	Apps	Goals
Shenzhen Ruby	2011	Chinese Super League	20	1	1	0	-		-		21	1
Shenzhen Ruby	2012	China League One	14	0	1	0	-		-		15	0
Shenzhen Ruby	2013	China League One	13	0	1	0	-		-		14	0
Shenzhen Ruby	2014	China League One	18	0	2	0	-		-		20	0
Shenzhen Ruby	2015	China League One	22	2	2	0	-		-		24	2
Shenzhen Ruby	2016	China League One	28	1	0	0	-		-		28	1
Shenzhen Ruby	2017	China League One	1	0	2	0	-		-		3	0
Shenzhen Ruby	Total		116	4	9	0	0	0	0	0	125	4
Jiangsu Yancheng Dingli	2018	China League Two	29	0	1	0	-		-		30	0
Jiangsu Yancheng Dingli	2019	China League Two	0	0	0	0	-		-		0	0
Jiangsu Yancheng Dingli	Total		29	0	1	0	0	0	0	0	30	0
Sichuan Jiuniu	2019	China League Two	16	0	0	0	-		-		16	0
Sichuan Jiuniu	2020	China League One	11	0	-		-		-		0	0
Sichuan Jiuniu	Total		27	0	0	0	0	0	0	0	27	0
Career total			172	4	10	0	0	0	0	0	182	4
