= Wang Qiao (footballer) =

Chinese footballer

Wang Qiao 王峤
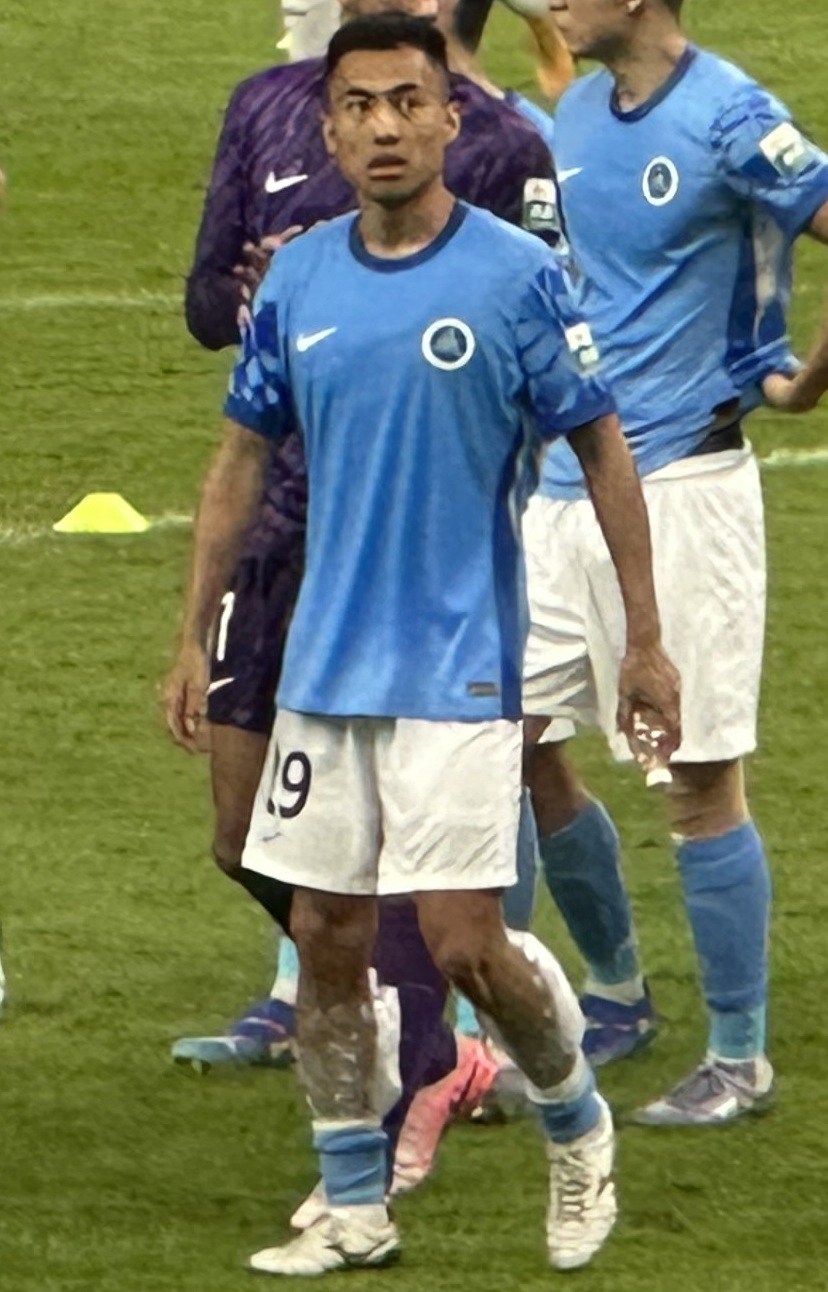
- Wang Qiao in April 2025

Personal information
- Date of birth: 20 February 1995 (age 31)
- Place of birth: Tieling, Liaoning, China
- Height: 1.70 m (5 ft 7 in)
- Position: Midfielder

Team information
- Current team: Qingdao Hainiu
- Number: 17

Youth career
- Liaoning Youth

Senior career*
Years	Team	Apps	(Gls)
2013	Liaoning Youth	3	(0)
2013–2019	Liaoning Whowin	29	(0)
2019	→ Sichuan Jiuniu (loan)	7	(0)
2020–2025	Shenzhen Peng City	95	(2)
2022	→ Chongqing Liangjiang Athletic (loan)	0	(0)
2026–	Qingdao Hainiu	11	(0)

International career^{‡}
2016–2017	China U-23	2	(0)
- * Club domestic league appearances and goals as of 22 November 2026 ‡ National team caps and goals as of 28 March 2017

Wang Qiao (Chinese: 王峤; pinyin: Wáng Qiáo; born 26 March 1995) is a Chinese football player who plays for Qingdao Hainiu.

== Club career ==
Wang Qiao started his professional football career in 2013 when he was promoted to Liaoning Youth's squad for the 2013 China League Two. He moved to Chinese Super League side Liaoning Whowin in the summer of 2013. On 7 August 2013, he made his debut for Liaoning in the quarter-finals of 2013 Chinese FA Cup which Liaoning lost to Guizhou Renhe 4–0. Wang made his Super League debut on 18 September 2016 in a 6–2 away defeat against Guangzhou Evergrande, coming on as a substitute for Zhang Tianlong in the 68th minute.

At the end of the 2017 Chinese Super League, Wang would be part of the squad that was relegated. After a season he was loaned to third tier football club Sichuan Jiuniu where he would help them win promotion. He would go on to make the move permanent after his loan expired.

== Career statistics ==
As of 2 November 2024.

Club	Season	League			National Cup		Continental		Other		Total	
Club	Season	Division	Apps	Goals	Apps	Goals	Apps	Goals	Apps	Goals	Apps	Goals
Liaoning Youth	2013	China League Two	3	0	-		-		-		3	0
Liaoning Whowin	2013	Chinese Super League	0	0	1	0	-		-		1	0
Liaoning Whowin	2016	Chinese Super League	1	0	1	0	-		-		2	0
Liaoning Whowin	2017	Chinese Super League	6	0	0	0	-		-		6	0
Liaoning Whowin	2018	China League One	20	0	1	0	-		-		21	0
Liaoning Whowin	2019	China League One	1	0	2	1	-		-		3	1
Liaoning Whowin	Total		28	0	5	1	0	0	0	0	33	1
Sichuan Jiuniu (loan)	2019	China League Two	7	0	0	0	-		-		7	0
Sichuan Jiuniu/ Shenzhen Peng City	2020	China League One	13	0	-		-		-		13	0
Sichuan Jiuniu/ Shenzhen Peng City	2021	China League One	29	0	4	0	-		-		33	0
Sichuan Jiuniu/ Shenzhen Peng City	2022	China League One	18	1	1	0	-		-		19	1
Sichuan Jiuniu/ Shenzhen Peng City	2023	China League One	16	1	2	0	-		-		18	1
Sichuan Jiuniu/ Shenzhen Peng City	2024	Chinese Super League	8	0	2	0	-		-		10	0
Sichuan Jiuniu/ Shenzhen Peng City	Total		84	2	9	0	0	0	0	0	93	2
Career total			122	2	14	1	0	0	0	0	136	3
