= Wuxi Wugo F.C. =

Chinese football club

Wuxi Wugo 无锡吴钩
- Full name: Wuxi Wugo Football Club 无锡吴钩足球俱乐部
- Founded: 2011; 15 years ago
- Ground: Wuxi Sports Center
- Capacity: 28,000
- Manager: Bruno Dias
- League: China League One
- 2025: China League Two, 2nd of 24 (promoted)
Home colours	Away colours

Wuxi Wugo Football Club (Chinese: 无锡吴钩足球俱乐部; pinyin: Wúxī Wúgōu Zúqiú Jùlèbù) is a Chinese professional football club based in Wuxi, Jiangsu, that competes in China League One, the second tier of Chinese football. Wuxi Wugo plays its home matches at the Wuxi Sports Center, located within Binhu District.

== History ==
Wuxi Xinje F.C. was founded in 2011. The club participated in Chinese Champions League in 2020 and was promoted to China League Two. In 2021, the club changed its name to Wuxi Wugou F.C. In March 2023, the club changed its name to Wuxi Wugo F.C.

== Name history ==
- 2011–2020 Wuxi Xinje F.C. 无锡信捷
- 2021–2022 Wuxi Wugou F.C. 无锡吴钩
- 2023– Wuxi Wugo F.C. 无锡吴钩

== Players ==
=== Current squad ===
As of July 2026

Note: Flags indicate national team as defined under FIFA eligibility rules; some limited exceptions apply. Players may hold more than one non-FIFA nationality.

No.	Pos.	Nation	Player
2	DF	CHN	Liu Boyang (on loan from Ningbo FC)
3	MF	CHN	Xie Xiaofan
4	DF	BIH	Tarik Isić
5	DF	CHN	Lin Jiahao
6	MF	CHN	Ahmat Tursunjan
7	MF	URU	Nicolás Albarracín
9	MF	CHN	Wang Yifan (on loan from Shanghai Shenhua)
10	DF	CHN	Wu Lei
13	GK	CHN	Zhu Yueqi
14	GK	CHN	Hao Kesen
16	MF	CHN	Zhou Pinxin
17	FW	CHN	Sun Zhixuan
18	MF	CHN	Meng Junjie (on loan from Nantong Zhiyun)
19	FW	NED	Nino Noordanus
20	MF	CHN	Zhang Yonglong

No.	Pos.	Nation	Player
21	DF	CHN	Gao Jingchun
22	DF	CHN	Gui Zihan (on loan from Liaoning Tieren)
23	MF	CHN	Dong Kaining
25	DF	CHN	Wang Zihao
26	DF	CHN	Gou Junchen
27	MF	CHN	He Wei
28	DF	CHN	Zhou Zhixuan
29	MF	CHN	Li Bowen
30	FW	CHN	Li Boxi
31	MF	CHN	Zhou Yunyi
36	MF	CHN	Tang Rui (on loan from Shandong Taishan)
37	MF	CHN	Yi Xianlong
38	MF	CHN	Chen Guokang
39	GK	CHN	Liu Pengfei

=== Out on loan ===
Note: Flags indicate national team as defined under FIFA eligibility rules; some limited exceptions apply. Players may hold more than one non-FIFA nationality.

No.	Pos.	Nation	Player
—	MF	CHN	Zhang Zijun (at (China) Ganzhou Ruishi until 31 December 2026)
—	DF	CHN	Mao Ziyu (at (China) Tai'an Tiankuang until 31 December 2026)

No.	Pos.	Nation	Player
—	FW	CHN	Zanhar Beshathan (at (China) Nantong Zhiyun until 31 December 2026)

=== Reserve squad ===
Note: Flags indicate national team as defined under FIFA eligibility rules; some limited exceptions apply. Players may hold more than one non-FIFA nationality.

No.	Pos.	Nation	Player

== Managerial staff ==
Position	Staff
Head coach	(Portugal) Bruno Dias
Assistant coach	(China) Wang Dan
Assistant coach	(China) Zhu Yongzhou
Assistant coach	(China) Zhaidar Zhanatbek
Goalkeeping Coach	(China) Li Rui
Fitness coach	(Brazil) Juninho
