= Su Junfeng =

Chinese footballer

Personal information
- Date of birth: 24 November 1989 (age 36)
- Place of birth: China
- Height: 1.78 m (5 ft 10 in)
- Position: Forward

Team information
- Current team: Tai'an Tiankuang

Senior career*
Years	Team	Apps	(Gls)
2015–2016	Baoding Rongda	17	(2)
2017	Northern Tigers	5	(0)
2018–2019	Yinchuan Helanshan	42	(13)
2019–2021	Sichuan Jiuniu	29	(5)
2022–2023	Tai'an Tiankuang	36	(4)
Total		129	(24)
- * Club domestic league appearances and goals as of 3 May 2022

Su Junfeng (Chinese: 苏峻峰; born 24 November 1989) is a Chinese former footballer who plays as a forward.

== Career ==
Su started his career with Chinese fourth division side Baoding Rongda, helping them achieve promotion to the Chinese second division within 3 seasons.

In 2017, he signed for Northern Tigers in the Australian third division.

Before the 2018 season, Su signed for Chinese third division club Yinchuan Helanshan.

On 29 January 2026, the Chinese Football Association announced that Su was banned from football-related activities in China for life for involving in match-fixing.

== Career statistics ==
Appearances and goals by club, season and competition
Club	Season	League			Cup		Continental		Other		Total	
Club	Season	Division	Apps	Goals	Apps	Goals	Apps	Goals	Apps	Goals	Apps	Goals
Baoding Rongda	2015	China League Two	7	2	–		–		–		7	2
Baoding Rongda	2016	China League Two	10	0	1	0	–		–		11	0
Baoding Rongda	Total		17	2	1	0	0	0	0	0	18	2
Northern Tigers	2017	NPL NSW Men's 2	5	0	–		–		–		5	0
Yinchuan Helanshan	2018	China League Two	27	9	1	0	–		–		28	9
Yinchuan Helanshan	2019	China League Two	15	4	1	0	–		–		16	4
Yinchuan Helanshan	Total		42	13	2	0	0	0	0	0	44	13
Sichuan Jiuniu	2019	China League Two	17	5	–		–		–		17	5
Sichuan Jiuniu	2020	China League One	7	0	–		–		–		7	0
Sichuan Jiuniu	2021	China League One	5	0	0	0	–		–		5	0
Sichuan Jiuniu	Total		29	5	0	0	0	0	0	0	29	5
Tai'an Tiankuang	2022	China League Two	14	1	–		–		–		14	1
Tai'an Tiankuang	2023	China League Two	22	3	1	0	–		–		23	3
Tai'an Tiankuang	Total		36	4	1	0	0	0	0	0	37	4
Career total			129	24	4	0	0	0	0	0	133	24
