= Zhang Chenliang =

Chinese footballer (born 1998)

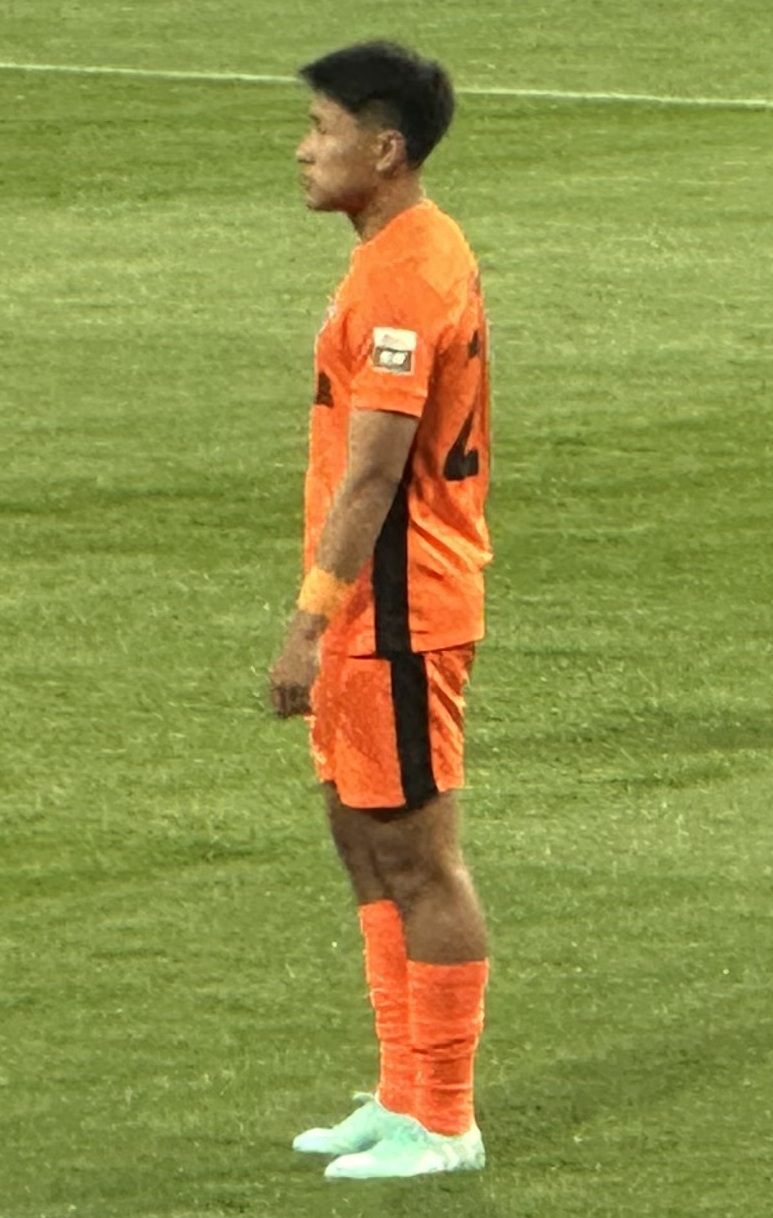
- Zhang Chenliang in May 2025

Personal information
- Full name: Zhang Chenliang
- Birth name: Zhang Liang
- Date of birth: 26 June 1998 (age 28)
- Place of birth: Datong, Shanxi, China
- Height: 1.83 m (6 ft 0 in)
- Positions: Right-back; centre-back

Team information
- Current team: Yunnan Yukun
- Number: 26

Youth career
- Liaoning Whowin
- –2016: Hebei Elite

Senior career*
Years	Team	Apps	(Gls)
2016–2019	Hebei Elite	58	(6)
2019	→ Inner Mongolia Zhongyou (loan)	0	(0)
2020–2024	Shijiazhuang Gongfu	114	(16)
2025–	Yunnan Yukun	45	(0)
- * Club domestic league appearances and goals as of 19 November 2026

Zhang Chenliang (simplified Chinese: 张宸梁; traditional Chinese: 張宸梁; pinyin: Zhāng Chénliáng; born Zhang Liang (Note: simplified Chinese: 张梁; traditional Chinese: 張梁; pinyin: Zhāng Liáng; Zhang changed to his current name in early 2019.); 26 June 1998) is a Chinese professional footballer who plays as a right-back or centre-back for Chinese Super League club Yunnan Yukun.

== Early life ==
Zhang Liang was born in Datong, Shanxi. At the age of seven, Zhang began training in taekwondo as it was one of his father's hobbies. Around two years later at the age of nine, Zhang switched to football when a friend of his father met a recruiter from a football team, and his father then suggested that Zhang join the team. He was later identified by Liaoning Whowin and he joined their youth academy thereafter. After Liaoning Whowin dissolved their youth team, Zhang briefly returned to Datong Sports School, before going on trial at Hebei Elite and its Brazilian affiliate Olé Brasil Futebol Clube. He was eventually picked in the final squad and trained with Botafogo-SP abroad in Brazil.

== Career ==
=== Hebei Elite ===
On 23 April 2016, Zhang Liang made his senior debut for China League Two side Hebei Elite in a 1–0 away win over Shenyang Dongjin. By the end of the 2016 season, he amassed four appearances. He became a rotational player in the 2017 season, earning fifteen appearances. On 29 July 2017, Zhang scored his first professional goal, notching the winner in the 93rd minute in a 1–0 away win against Yancheng Dafeng. In 2018, he became a starter for Hebei Elite, featuring in 26 league matches, including play-offs, and was one of the stand-out under-21 players of the league season.

In early 2019, Zhang Liang changed his legal name to Zhang Chenliang. On 2 March 2019, Zhang Chenliang was loaned out to China League One side Inner Mongolia Zhongyou. He made his only appearance for the club in a 2019 Chinese FA Cup tie against Shijiazhuang Ever Bright. He was recalled by Hebei Elite in the summer transfer window.

=== Shijiazhuang Gongfu ===
In 2020, Zhang joined newly-founded Chinese Champions League club Hebei Jingying Zhihai, following the acquisition of Hebei Elite by its new owners. He appeared in all four matches of the campaign, and Hebei Jingying Zhihai were promoted to China League Two after sufficient teams in the leagues above them in the league system were denied entry into the 2021 season. Zhang scored his first goal for Hebei Kungfu on 25 May 2021, in a 2–1 loss to Inner Mongolia Caoshangfei. Hebei Kungfu finished the 2021 China League Two season in second place, earning back-to-back promotions. On 12 June 2022，Zhang scored the winning goal in a 2–1 win against Suzhou Dongwu, helping Shijiazhuang Gongfu secure their first ever China League One victory. On 11 September 2022, Zhang Chenliang scored two goals and provided one assist for Venício in a 5–0 victory over BIT. For his performance, he was named one of the players of the round. On 6 May 2023, Zhang scored the equaliser in the 83rd minute of a 1–1 away draw with Yanbian Longding. On 1 July 2023, Zhang scored an 81st-minute winning goal in a 3–2 away win over Heilongjiang Ice City. On 12 May 2024, Zhang scored a 87rd-minute winner in a 2–1 home win over Foshan Nanshi. In the 2024 Chinese FA Cup, Zhang Chenliang scored a goal and a penalty in the penalty shootout in a shootout loss to Qingdao West Coast. On 14 July 2024, he scored the only goal in a 1–0 win over Guangzhou. On 27 January 2025, it was announced that Zhang Chenliang has left the club upon the expiry of his contract.

=== Yunnan Yukun ===
On 19 January 2025, Zhang joined Chinese Super League newcomers Yunnan Yukun on a free transfer. He made his debut for the club in a 2–0 home loss in the league opener to Beijing Guoan, playing the full ninety minutes on 22 February 2025.

== Career statistics ==
As of 22 November 2025

Appearances and goals by club, season, and competition
Club	Season	League			Cup		Continental		Other		Total	
Club	Season	Division	Apps	Goals	Apps	Goals	Apps	Goals	Apps	Goals	Apps	Goals
Hebei Elite	2016	China League Two	4	0	0	0	–		–		4	0
Hebei Elite	2017	China League Two	14	1	1	0	–		–		15	1
Hebei Elite	2018	China League Two	26	4	1	0	–		–		27	4
Hebei Elite	2019	China League Two	14	1	0	0	–		2 (Note: Appearances in China League Two play-offs)	0	16	1
Hebei Elite	Total		58	6	2	0	0	0	2	0	62	6
Inner Mongolia Zhongyou (loan)	2019	China League One	0	0	1	0	–		–		1	0
Shijiazhuang Gongfu	2020	CMCL	4	0	–		–		–		4	0
Shijiazhuang Gongfu	2021	China League Two	27	3	0	0	–		–		27	3
Shijiazhuang Gongfu	2022	China League One	29	7	0	0	–		–		29	7
Shijiazhuang Gongfu	2023	China League One	26	3	0	0	–		–		26	3
Shijiazhuang Gongfu	2024	China League One	28	3	1	1	–		–		29	4
Shijiazhuang Gongfu	Total		114	16	1	1	0	0	0	0	115	17
Yunnan Yukun	2025	Chinese Super League	23	0	4	0	–		–		27	0
Career total			195	22	8	1	0	0	2	0	205	23
