= Wen Xue =

Chinese footballer

Wen Xue 문학 文学
Personal information
- Date of birth: 5 February 1993 (age 33)
- Place of birth: Helong, Jilin, China
- Height: 1.70 m (5 ft 7 in)
- Position: Midfielder

Team information
- Current team: Yanbian Longding

Senior career*
Years	Team	Apps	(Gls)
2012–2018	Yanbian Funde	20	(0)
2019–2021	Heilongjiang Lava Spring	13	(1)
2022-	Yanbian Longding	0	(0)
- * Club domestic league appearances and goals as of 5 May 2022

Wen Xue
- Simplified Chinese: 文学
Transcriptions
Standard Mandarin
- Hanyu Pinyin: Wén Xué
- IPA: [wə̌n.ɕɥě]

Chinese Korean name
- Chosŏn'gŭl: 문학
Transcriptions
- Revised Romanization: Mun Hak
- McCune–Reischauer: Mun Hak

Wen Xue (Chinese: 文学; Korean: 문학; born 5 February 1993) is a Chinese footballer who currently plays for China League Two side Yanbian Longding.

== Club career ==
Wen Xue started his professional football career in 2012 when he was promoted to China League One side Yanbian FC's first squad. On 26 June 2012, he made his senior debut in a 2012 Chinese FA Cup match which Yanbian lost to Dalian Shide 8–0. He played 6 league matches in the 2015 season as Yanbian won promotion to the Chinese Super League. On 16 July 2016, Li made his Super League debut in a 3–0 home victory against Jiangsu Suning, coming on as a substitute for Chi Zhongguo in the 86th minute. On 26 February 2019, Yanbian Funde was dissolved due to owing taxes.

He would go on to join second tier football club Heilongjiang Lava Spring. He would make his debut in a league game on 7 September 2019 against Inner Mongolia Zhongyou F.C. in a 2-0 victory.

== Career statistics ==
Statistics accurate as of match played 31 December 2020.

Appearances and goals by club, season and competition
Club	Season	League			National Cup		Continental		Other		Total	
Club	Season	Division	Apps	Goals	Apps	Goals	Apps	Goals	Apps	Goals	Apps	Goals
Yanbian Funde	2012	China League One	0	0	1	0	-		-		1	0
Yanbian Funde	2013	China League One	3	0	1	0	-		-		4	0
Yanbian Funde	2014	China League One	1	0	1	0	-		-		2	0
Yanbian Funde	2015	China League One	6	0	2	0	-		-		8	0
Yanbian Funde	2016	Chinese Super League	1	0	1	0	-		-		2	0
Yanbian Funde	2017	Chinese Super League	0	0	1	0	-		-		1	0
Yanbian Funde	2018	China League One	9	0	1	0	-		-		10	0
Yanbian Funde	Total		20	0	8	0	0	0	0	0	28	0
Heilongjiang Lava Spring	2019	China League One	2	0	0	0	-		-		2	0
Heilongjiang Lava Spring	2020	China League One	4	1	-		-		0 (Note: Appearances in China League One relegation play-offs)	0	4	1
Heilongjiang Lava Spring	Total		6	1	0	0	0	0	0	0	6	1
Career total			26	1	8	0	0	0	0	0	34	1

== Honours ==
=== Club ===
Yanbian Changbaishan

- China League One: 2015
