= Xie Zhen (footballer) =

Chinese association football player

Personal information
- Date of birth: 30 October 1998 (age 28)
- Place of birth: Rugao, Nantong, Jiangsu, China
- Height: 1.77 m (5 ft 10 in)
- Position: Midfielder

Team information
- Current team: Xi'an Hi-Tech Zone

Youth career
- Jiangsu Suning

Senior career*
Years	Team	Apps	(Gls)
2018	Vizela	1	(0)
2019	Inner Mongolia Caoshangfei	1	(0)
2019–2020	Nantong Zhiyun	0	(0)
2021–	Xi'an Hi-Tech Zone		
- * Club domestic league appearances and goals as of 17:14, 15 February 2023 (UTC)

Xie Zhen (Chinese: 谢镇; born 30 October 1998) is a Chinese footballer currently playing as a midfielder for Xi'an Hi-Tech Zone.

== Club career ==
In February 2018, Xie signed for Portuguese club Vizela alongside compatriot Liu Sheng.

== Career statistics ==
=== Club ===
As of 15 February 2023.

Appearances and goals by club, season and competition
Club	Season	League			Cup		Other		Total	
Club	Season	Division	Apps	Goals	Apps	Goals	Apps	Goals	Apps	Goals
Vizela	2017–18	Campeonato de Portugal	1	0	0	0	0	0	1	0
Inner Mongolia Caoshangfei	2019	China League Two	1	0	2 (Note: Appearances in the Chinese FA Cup)	0	0	0	3	0
Nantong Zhiyun	2019	China League One	0	0	0	0	0	0	0	0
Nantong Zhiyun	2020	China League One	0	0	0	0	0	0	0	0
Nantong Zhiyun	Total		0	0	0	0	0	0	0	0
Career total			2	0	2	0	0	0	4	0
