= Wang Dong (footballer, born 1995) =

Chinese association football player

Personal information
- Date of birth: 6 January 1995 (age 31)
- Place of birth: Xuzhou, Jiangsu, China
- Height: 1.77 m (5 ft 10 in)
- Position: Defender

Team information
- Current team: Zhuhai Qin'ao

Youth career
- Jiangsu Sainty
- 2007–2014: Changchun Yatai
- 2015: Mafra

Senior career*
Years	Team	Apps	(Gls)
2015–2017	Loures	1	(0)
2016	→ Eléctrico (loan)	2	(0)
2016–2017	→ Oriental (loan)	2	(0)
2017	Tourizense	14	(0)
2017	Oleiros	3	(0)
2017–2018	Tourizense	9	(0)
2018–2020	Cova da Piedade B	8	(0)
2019	→ Kunming Zheng He Shipman (loan)	10	(0)
2020–2021	Kunming Zheng He Shipman	25	(0)
2022-	Zhuhai Qin'ao	0	(0)
- * Club domestic league appearances and goals as of 17:14, 5 May 2022 (UTC)

Wang Dong (Chinese: 王栋; born 6 January 1995) is a Chinese footballer currently playing as a defender for Zhuhai Qin'ao in China League Two.

== Career statistics ==
=== Club ===
As of 25 July 2021.

Club	Season	League			National Cup		League Cup		Other		Total	
Club	Season	Division	Apps	Goals	Apps	Goals	Apps	Goals	Apps	Goals	Apps	Goals
GS Loures	2015–16	Campeonato de Portugal	1	0	0	0	–		0	0	1	0
GS Loures	2016–17	Campeonato de Portugal	0	0	0	0	–		0	0	0	0
GS Loures	Total		1	0	0	0	0	0	0	0	1	0
Eléctrico (loan)	2015–16	Campeonato de Portugal	2	0	0	0	–		0	0	2	0
Oriental (loan)	2016–17	Campeonato de Portugal	2	0	1 (Note: Appearances in the Taça de Portugal)	0	–		0	0	3	0
Tourizense	2016–17	Campeonato de Portugal	14	0	0	0	–		0	0	14	0
Oleiros	2017–18	Campeonato de Portugal	3	0	2	0	–		0	0	5	0
Tourizense	2017–18	Honra AF Coimbra	9	0	0	0	–		0	0	9	0
Cova da Piedade B	2018–19	I AF Setúbal	8	0	–		–		0	0	8	0
Changchun Yatai	2019	China League One	0	0	0	0	–		0	0	0	0
Kunming Zheng He Shipman	2019	China League Two	10	0	0	0	–		0	0	10	0
Kunming Zheng He Shipman	2020	China League Two	6	0	0	0	–		0	0	6	0
Kunming Zheng He Shipman	2021	China League Two	12	0	0	0	–		0	0	12	0
Kunming Zheng He Shipman	Total		28	0	0	0	0	0	0	0	28	0
Career total			67	0	3	0	0	0	0	0	70	0
