= Huang Zhun (footballer) =

Chinese footballer

Huang Zhun 黄准
Personal information
- Full name: Huang Zhun
- Date of birth: 27 January 1989 (age 37)
- Place of birth: Qingdao, Shandong, China
- Height: 1.87 m (6 ft 2 in)
- Position: Defender

Team information
- Current team: Dandong Tengyue
- Number: 3

Youth career
- Qingdao Hailifeng

Senior career*
Years	Team	Apps	(Gls)
2008	Chongqing Lifan	0	(0)
2009–2011	Qingdao Jonoon	18	(0)
2012–2013	Shenyang Dongjin	14	(0)
2014–2016	Guizhou Zhicheng	13	(1)
2017–2020	Sichuan Jiuniu	20	(0)
2019	→ Qingdao Jonoon (loan)	2	(0)
2021–	Dandong Tengyue	0	(0)
- * Club domestic league appearances and goals as of 31 December 2020

Huang Zhun (Chinese: 黄准; born 27 January 1989) is a Qingdao, Shandong, Chinese footballer who currently plays for Dandong Tengyue in the China League Two.

== Club career ==
Huang Zhun started his career of professional football in 2008 when he joined Chongqing Lifan for the 2008 China League One campaign. In March 2009, Huang transferred to Chinese Super League side Qingdao Jonoon. On 14 June 2009, he made his debut for Qingdao Jonoon in the 2009 Chinese Super League against Shenzhen Ruby, coming on as a substitute for Zou Zheng in the 90th minute. In March 2012, Pang transferred to China League One side Shenyang Dongjin.

In March 2014, Pang transferred to China League Two side Guizhou Zhicheng. He would be part of the squad that gained promotion to their second tier at the end of the 2014 China League Two campaign.

== Career statistics ==
Statistics accurate as of match played 31 December 2020.

Appearances and goals by club, season and competition
Club	Season	League			National Cup		Continental		Other		Total	
Club	Season	Division	Apps	Goals	Apps	Goals	Apps	Goals	Apps	Goals	Apps	Goals
Chongqing Lifan	2008	China League One	0	0	-		-		-		0	0
Qingdao Jonoon	2009	Chinese Super League	10	0	-		-		-		10	0
Qingdao Jonoon	2010	Chinese Super League	8	0	-		-		-		8	0
Qingdao Jonoon	2011	Chinese Super League	0	0	0	0	-		-		0	0
Qingdao Jonoon	Total		18	0	0	0	0	0	0	0	18	0
Shenyang Dongjin	2012	China League One	8	0	1	0	-		-		9	0
Shenyang Dongjin	2013	China League Two	6	0	2	1	-		-		8	1
Shenyang Dongjin	Total		14	0	3	1	0	0	0	0	17	1
Guizhou Zhicheng	2014	China League Two	0	0	0	0	-		-		0	0
Guizhou Zhicheng	2015	China League One	13	1	2	0	-		-		15	1
Guizhou Zhicheng	2016	China League One	0	0	1	0	-		-		1	0
Guizhou Zhicheng	Total		13	1	3	0	0	0	0	0	16	1
Sichuan Jiuniu	2018	China League Two	20	0	6	0	-		-		26	0
Sichuan Jiuniu	2019	China League Two	0	0	1	0	-		-		1	0
Sichuan Jiuniu	Total		20	0	7	0	0	0	0	0	27	0
Qingdao Jonoon (loan)	2019	China League Two	2	0	0	0	-		-		2	0
Career total			67	1	13	1	0	0	0	0	80	2
