= Kunshan F.C. =

Chinese football club

Kunshan FC 昆山FC
- Full name: Kunshan Football Club 昆山足球俱乐部
- Founded: 12 December 2014; 11 years ago (as Zhenjiang Huasa F.C.); 2018 (as Kunshan F.C.)
- Dissolved: 29 March 2023; 2 years ago
- Ground: Kunshan Stadium; Kunshan
- Capacity: 30,000
- Chairman: Fu Qiang
- 2022: League One, 1st of 18
- Website: http://kunshanfc.cn/
Home colours	Away colours

Kunshan Football Club (Chinese: 昆山足球俱乐部) or Kunshan FC, formerly known as Zhenjiang Huasa, was a professional Chinese football club based in Kunshan, Jiangsu, China. They participated in the Chinese Super League, under licence from the Chinese Football Association (CFA). It was founded on 12 December 2014 as the amateur Zhenjiang Huasa Football Club, before moving to Kunshan, where the Kunshan municipal party committee and municipal government became their major shareholders. The club was dissolved in March 2023.

== History ==
Zhenjiang Huasa, whose members were mainly fans of FC Barcelona in China, was founded on 12 December 2014. Huasa, meaning Chinese Barca, was used as the club's name. They played in the 2016 China Amateur Football League and won the winners of 2016 Jiangsu Provincial Football League. Zhenjiang Huasa finished the 6th place in the national finals and won promotion to 2017 China League Two. In December 2018, Zhenjiang Huasa moved to Kunshan and changed their name to Kunshan F.C. With the support of the Kunshan Municipal Party Committee and Municipal Government as well as private financing the club were able to gain stability, improve their position to ninth and gain a total of 80310 fans with the highest average attendance of 5534 at the end of the 2019 league season. While the club finished in ninth at the end of the season they were granted promotion to the second tier, due to the expansion of the league and disbandment of Tianjin Tianhai.

In their debut season within the second tier, manager Gao Yao was able to guide the team to a third-place finish, however, unable to improve upon these results in the following season, he was let go by the club on 16 September 2021 and replaced by Sergio Zarco Díaz. In the 2022 China League One campaign, Sergio was able to gain promotion to the top tier for the first time in the club's history, winning the division with the highest recorded points total in the division's history. However, the club was dissolved before its participation in the Chinese Super League.

== Name history ==
Year	Team name	Club name
2015	Zhenjiang Huasa	Zhenjiang Huasa Football Club
2015	Danyang Henglu	Zhenjiang Huasa Football Club
2015	Zhenjiang Hua Sahenglu	Zhenjiang Huasa Football Club
2017–2018	Zhenjiang Cultural Tourism Huasa	Zhenjiang Huasa Football Club
2019–2021	Kunshan FC	Kunshan Football Club

== Crest history ==
Kunshan logo used since 2018

== Managerial history ==
- (China) Li Dong (2016–2017)
- (Serbia) Dragan Stančić (caretaker) (2017)
- (Canada) Goran Miscevic (2017)
- (China) Li Xiao (2017)
- (China) Tang Jing (2018)
- (Serbia) Dragan Okuka (2019)
- (China) Gao Yao (2019–2021)
- (Spain) Sergio Zarco Díaz (2021–2023)

== Honours ==
- China League One
  - Champions (1): 2022

== Results ==
All-time league rankings

As of the start of 2023 season.

Year	Div	Pld	W	D	L	GF	GA	GD	Pts	Pos.	FA Cup	Super Cup	AFC	Att./G	Stadium
2015	5	6	3	0	3	20	11	9	–^{1}	6	DNQ	DNQ	DNQ		
2016	5								–^{1}	1	DNQ	DNQ	DNQ		
2016	4									6	DNQ	DNQ	DNQ		Zhenjiang Sports and Exhibition Center
2017	3	24	2	5	17	22	50	−28	11	21	R1	DNQ	DNQ	927	Zhenjiang Sports and Exhibition Center
2018	3	28	12	7	9	31	33	−2	43	13	R2	DNQ	DNQ	2,598	Zhenjiang Sports and Exhibition Center
2019	3	30	17	4	9	45	23	22	55^{2}	9	R1	DNQ	DNQ	5,534	Kunshan Stadium
2020	2	15	7	4	4	14	12	2	25	3	QF	DNQ	DNQ	927	Kunshan Stadium
2021	2	34	13	12	9	56	35	21	51	9	R4	DNQ	DNQ	0	Kunshan Stadium
2022	2	34	28	5	1	80	19	61	89	1	R2	DNQ	DNQ		Kunshan Stadium

- In final stage.
- In group stage.

Key

	China top division
	China second division
	China third division
	China fourth division
W	Winners
RU	Runners-up
3	Third place
	Relegated

- Pld = Played
- W = Games won
- D = Games drawn
- L = Games lost
- F = Goals for
- A = Goals against
- Pts = Points
- Pos = Final position
- DNQ = Did not qualify
- DNE = Did not enter
- NH = Not Held
- – = Does Not Exist
- R1 = Round 1
- R2 = Round 2
- R3 = Round 3
- R4 = Round 4
- F = Final
- SF = Semi-finals
- QF = Quarter-finals
- R16 = Round of 16
- Group = Group stage
- GS2 = Second Group stage
- QR1 = First Qualifying Round
- QR2 = Second Qualifying Round
- QR3 = Third Qualifying Round
