= Nantong Zhiyun F.C. =

Chinese football club

Nantong Zhiyun
- Full name: Nantong Zhiyun Football Club 南通支云足球俱乐部
- Founded: 13 March 2016; 10 years ago
- Ground: Rugao Olympic Sports Center, Rugao, Jiangsu
- Capacity: 25,000
- Chairman: Fan Bing
- Head coach: Kim Dae-eui
- League: China League One
- 2025: China League One, 7th of 16
- Website: www.nantongzhiyunfc.com
Home colours	Away colours

Nantong Zhiyun Football Club (Chinese: 南通支云足球俱乐部; pinyin: Nántōng Zhīyún Zúqiú Jùlèbù) is a Chinese professional football club based in Rugao, Jiangsu, that competes in China League One, the second tier of Chinese football. Nantong Zhiyun plays its home matches at the Rugao Olympic Sports Center, located within Rugao. The club was founded on 13 March 2016 by Fan Bing with the support from the Rugao and Nantong municipal governments, and the Jiangsu provincial government. The club name Zhiyun derives from Zhiyun Tower, a tower of historic significance in Nantong, and is depicted on its club badge.

== History ==
The club was formed when the Nantong Municipal Football Association bought the first team of Guangxi Longguida F.C. as well as their registration and position in the Chinese Football Association China League Two division. Nantong Zhiyun F.C. was officially established on March 13, 2016, in a launching ceremony held in Rugao, Nantong in the Jiangsu province where the Chairman Fan Bing, with the support from the Rugao, Nantong and Jiangsu Province Municipal Government, announced that the club was named after the Zhiyun Pagoda situated on the top of the Langshan hill overlooking the city of Nantong. The club's badge would utilise a wolf as reference to Langshan hill's history with wolves while blue was chosen as the team's home colours. Former Chinese referee Li Jun was appointed as the club's general manager and former Chinese international Wei Xin as the club's Head Coach.

In the 2018 China League Two season, they gained promotion to the China League One for the first time in its history after beating Shaanxi Chang'an Athletic 1–0 at Shaanxi Province Stadium in front of 48,869 spectators on October 27, with a last minute goal by Nan Yunqi sealing the game. With that victory the club were able to gain investment after several shareholders left the club while they were in the third tier. In the second tier the club would struggle and Wei Xin was replaced with Gary White as Head Coach on 20 August 2019, who ensured the clubs survival within the division. On 31 March 2020, Xie Hui was brought in as the new Head Coach, however his vocal behaviour and critical options, particularly on the President of the Chinese Football Association, Chen Xuyuan saw him resign. On 26 August 2021, Cao Rui would be brought in to manage the team and he would go on to lead the team to third within the division and promotion to the top tier at the end of the 2022 China League One season.

In 2022, Nantong Zhiyun secured promotion to Chinese Super League for the first time in history from 2023 season after finishing third place in China League One in 2022 season.

== Players ==
=== Current squad ===
As of July 2026

Note: Flags indicate national team as defined under FIFA eligibility rules; some limited exceptions apply. Players may hold more than one non-FIFA nationality.

No.	Pos.	Nation	Player
1	GK	CHN	Nie Xuran
2	DF	CHN	Xu Hui
3	DF	CHN	Zhou Zhiheng
4	DF	CHN	Luo Xin
5	DF	CHN	Shen Chao (on loan from Zhejiang FC)
6	DF	CHN	Hu Mingfei
7	DF	CHN	Ye Daochi
8	MF	CHN	Liu Weicheng
10	FW	COD	Aldo Kalulu
11	MF	CHN	Ruan Yang
13	MF	CHN	Lin Guoyu
14	FW	COL	Jasond González
15	DF	CHN	Liu Wei
16	GK	CHN	Lü Jin

No.	Pos.	Nation	Player
17	FW	CHN	Ling Jie
19	FW	CHN	Nan Xiaoheng
20	MF	CHN	Jiang Jiapeng
21	MF	BRA	Lucas Kal
22	MF	CHN	Zhang Jingzhe
23	DF	HKG	Remi Dujardin
24	MF	CHN	Li Xingxian (on loan from Henan FC)
25	GK	CHN	Li Guanxi
26	MF	CHN	Deng Yubiao
27	DF	CHN	Wu Xingyu (on loan from Qingdao Hainiu)
28	MF	CHN	An Yifei
31	GK	CHN	Guo Ziyi
36	FW	CHN	Dai Yuanji (on loan from Nantong Haimen Codion)
37	FW	CHN	Jia Boyan
39	MF	CHN	Liu Ye
40	DF	CHN	Zanhar Beshathan (on loan from Wuxi Wugo)

=== Reserve squad ===
Note: Flags indicate national team as defined under FIFA eligibility rules; some limited exceptions apply. Players may hold more than one non-FIFA nationality.

No.	Pos.	Nation	Player

=== Out on loan ===
Note: Flags indicate national team as defined under FIFA eligibility rules; some limited exceptions apply. Players may hold more than one non-FIFA nationality.

No.	Pos.	Nation	Player
—	FW	CHN	Gu Jiayi (at (China) Xiamen Feilu until 31 December 2026)
—	DF	CHN	Liao Lei (at (China) Xiamen Feilu until 31 December 2026)
—	MF	CHN	Zhang Yuyue (at (China) Beijing IT until 31 December 2026)
—	GK	CHN	Lu Xunkai (at (China) Lanzhou Longyuan until 31 December 2026)

No.	Pos.	Nation	Player
—	DF	CHN	Dai Bowei (at (China) Qingdao Red Lions until 31 December 2026)
—	MF	CHN	Chen Xiangyu (at (China) Shanxi Chongde Ronghai until 31 December 2026)
—	FW	CHN	Meng Junjie (at (China) Wuxi Wugo until 31 December 2026)
—	DF	CHN	Kang Ruiyang (at (China) Nantong Haimen Codion until 31 December 2026)

== Coaching staff ==
Position	Staff
Head coach	(South Korea) Kim Dae-eui
Assistant coach	(South Korea) Yoon Jun-sung
Goalkeeping coach	(China) Li Huayang
Fitness coach	(China) Mi Wei
Team Manager	(China) Li Xiangbin

Last updated: 27 March 2025
Source: 27 March 2025

== Managerial history ==
- (China) Wei Xin (2016)
- (Croatia) Tomislav Stipić (2017)
- (China) Wei Xin (2017–2019)
- (England) Gary White (2019–2020)
- (China) Xie Hui (2020–2021)
- (China) Cao Rui (2021–2022)
- (Portugal) David Patricio (2023)
- (China) Zhu Qi (caretaker) (2023)
- (Spain) Gabri (2023)
- (Portugal) David Patricio (2023)
- (Serbia) Mihajlo Jurasović (2024)
- (Portugal) David Patricio (2024)
- (Japan) Yoshiyuki Shinoda (2025)
- (South Korea) Kim Dae-eui (2025-present)

== Results ==
All-time league rankings

As of the end of 2024 season.

Year	Div	Pld	W	D	L	GF	GA	GD	Pts	Pos.	FA Cup	Super Cup	AFC	Att./G	Stadium
2016	3	20	3	9	8	14	22	−8	18	16	R1	DNQ	DNQ	4,825	Rugao Olympic Sports Center
2017	3	24	11	6	7	24	19	5	39	8	R2	DNQ	DNQ	3,371	Rugao Olympic Sports Center
2018	3	31	21	5	5	58	22	36	68	RU	R16	DNQ	DNQ	9,126	Rugao Olympic Sports Center
2019	2	30	8	9	13	35	38	–3	33	12	R3	DNQ	DNQ	11,008	Rugao Olympic Sports Center
2020	2	15	5	7	3	16	16	0	22	12	DNQ	DNQ	DNQ		Rugao Olympic Sports Center
2021	2	34	20	5	9	62	30	32	65	5	R4	DNQ	DNQ		Rugao Olympic Sports Center
2022	2	34	21	7	6	62	22	40	70	3	R1	DNQ	DNQ		Rugao Olympic Sports Center
2023	1	30	4	10	16	26	42	–16	22	14	QF	DNQ	DNQ	15,432	Rugao Olympic Sports Center
2024	1	30	5	7	18	32	66	–34	22	16	R5	DNQ	DNQ	14,414	Rugao Olympic Sports Center

- ^1 in group stage.

Key

	China top division
	China second division
	China third division
	China fourth division
W	Winners
RU	Runners-up
3	Third place
	Relegated

- Pld = Played
- W = Games won
- D = Games drawn
- L = Games lost
- F = Goals for
- A = Goals against
- Pts = Points
- Pos = Final position
- DNQ = Did not qualify
- DNE = Did not enter
- NH = Not held
- – = Does not exist
- R1 = Round 1
- R2 = Round 2
- R3 = Round 3
- R4 = Round 4
- F = Final
- SF = Semi-finals
- QF = Quarter-finals
- R16 = Round of 16
- Group = Group stage
- GS2 = Second Group stage
- QR1 = First Qualifying Round
- QR2 = Second Qualifying Round
- QR3 = Third Qualifying Round
