= 2025 China League One =

22nd season of the China League One

China League One
- Season: 2025
- Dates: 15 March – 8 November 2025
- Champions: Liaoning Tieren (1st title)
- Promoted: Liaoning Tieren; Chongqing Tonglianglong
- Relegated: Qingdao Red Lions
- Matches: 240
- Goals: 627 (2.61 per match)
- Top goalscorer: Guy Mbenza (28 goals)
- Highest attendance: 39,868; Liaoning Tieren 4–2 Chongqing Tonglianglong (19 July 2025)
- Lowest attendance: 673; Shanghai Jiading Huilong 2–0 Qingdao Red Lions (22 April 2025)
- Total attendance: 1,355,128
- Average attendance: 8,115

The 2025 China Resources Beverage Chinese Football League 1 (Chinese: 2025华润饮料中国足球甲级联赛) was the 22nd season of China League One, the second tier of the Chinese football league pyramid, since its establishment in 2004.

== Clubs ==
=== Club changes ===
==== To League One ====
**Teams promoted from 2024 China League Two**

- Guangdong GZ-Power
- Dalian K'un City
- Shenzhen Juniors
- Shaanxi Union

**Teams relegated from 2024 Chinese Super League**

- Nantong Zhiyun

==== From League One ====
**Teams promoted to 2025 Chinese Super League**

- Yunnan Yukun
- Dalian Yingbo

**Teams relegated to 2025 China League Two**

- Wuxi Wugo
- Jiangxi Lushan

**Disqualified entries**

- ~~Guangzhou~~

==== Name changes ====
- Guangxi Pingguo Haliao F.C. changed their name to Guangxi Pingguo in January 2025.
- Heilongjiang Ice City F.C. relocated to Dingnan County, Ganzhou, Jiangxi, and changed their name to Jiangxi Dingnan United in February 2025.

=== Stadiums and locations ===
Locations of the 2025 China League One teams
2025 China League One teams in Guangdong and Jiangxi

Team	Head coach	City	Stadium	Capacity	2024 season
Nantong Zhiyun ^{R}	(South Korea) Kim Dae-eui	Rugao	Rugao Olympic Sports Center	25,000	CSL, 16th
Liaoning Tieren	(China) Li Jinyu	Shenyang	Shenyang Olympic Sports Centre Stadium	60,000	4th
Liaoning Tieren	(China) Li Jinyu	Shenyang	Shenyang Urban Stadium	20,000	4th
Liaoning Tieren	(China) Li Jinyu	Shenyang	Tiexi Stadium	40,000	4th
Chongqing Tonglianglong	(South Korea) Chang Woe-ryong	Chongqing	Tongliang Long Stadium	15,000	5th
Shijiazhuang Gongfu	(China) Niu Hongli	Shijiazhuang	Yutong International Sports Center	38,000	6th
Suzhou Dongwu	(Spain) Sergio Zarco Díaz	Suzhou	Suzhou Sports Center	35,000	7th
Suzhou Dongwu	(Spain) Sergio Zarco Díaz	Suzhou	Kunshan Sports Centre Stadium	30,000	7th
Guangxi Pingguo	(Japan) Koji Maeda	Pingguo	Pingguo Stadium	30,000	8th
Nanjing City	(China) Zhang Xiaofeng	Nanjing	Wutaishan Stadium	22,000	9th
Foshan Nanshi	(China) Wang Hongwei	Foshan	Nanhai Sports Center	20,000	10th
Shanghai Jiading Huilong	(Bulgaria) Zoran Janković	Shanghai	Jiading Stadium	9,704	11th
Yanbian Longding	(South Korea) Lee Ki-hyung	Yanji	Yanji Stadium	30,000	12th
Jiangxi Dingnan United	(China) Liu Jianye	Dingnan	Dingnan Youth Football Training Center	12,000	13th
Qingdao Red Lions	(Portugal) Francisco Castro	Qingdao	Qingdao Tiantai Stadium	20,525	14th
Guangdong GZ-Power ^{P}	(China) Feng Feng (caretaker)	Guangzhou	Yuexiushan Stadium	18,000	CL2, 1st
Guangdong GZ-Power ^{P}	(China) Feng Feng (caretaker)	Guangzhou	Huadu Stadium	13,394	CL2, 1st
Dalian K'un City ^{P}	(China) Zhao Faqing	Dalian	Jinzhou Stadium	30,776	CL2, 2nd
Shenzhen Juniors ^{P}	(China) Zhang Jun	Shenzhen	Longhua Cultural and Sports Center	2,364	CL2, 3rd
Shenzhen Juniors ^{P}	(China) Zhang Jun	Shenzhen	Bao'an Stadium	44,050	CL2, 3rd
Shenzhen Juniors ^{P}	(China) Zhang Jun	Shenzhen	Shenzhen Youth Football Training Base Centre Stadium	10,000	CL2, 3rd
Shenzhen Juniors ^{P}	(China) Zhang Jun	Shenzhen	Shenzhen Youth Football Training Base Field 1		CL2, 3rd
Shaanxi Union ^{P}	(Netherlands) Giovanni Franken	Xi'an	Weinan Sports Center Stadium (Weinan)	32,000	CL2, 4th

=== Foreign players ===
- Players name in **bold** indicates the player is registered during the mid-season transfer window.
- Players name in italics indicates the player is out of squad or left their respective clubs during the mid-season transfer window.

Team	Player 1	Player 2	Player 3	Hong Kong/Macau/Taiwan players^{1}	Naturalised players	Reserves players	Former players
Chongqing Tonglianglong	(Brazil) Leonardo	(Lithuania) Rimvydas Sadauskas	(Spain) José Ángel Carrillo	(Hong Kong) Ng Yu Hei			
Dalian K'un City	(Brazil) **Dominic Vinicius**	(Nigeria) Sabir Musa	(Zimbabwe) Nyasha Mushekwi	(Chinese Taipei) Wu Yen-shu			(Slovenia) Andrej Kotnik
Foshan Nanshi	(Netherlands) **Rodney Antwi**	(Serbia) Mario Maslać	(Uruguay) Nicolás Albarracín	(Chinese Taipei) Yu Yao-hsing			(Cape Verde) Carlos Fortes
Guangdong GZ-Power	(Brazil) Farley Rosa	(Brazil) João Carlos	(Brazil) Nikão	(Chinese Taipei) Wang Chien-ming	(Japan) → (China) Xia Dalong^{2}		
Guangxi Pingguo	(Brazil) Mateus Lima	(Cameroon) **Michael Cheukoua**	(Togo) Samuel Asamoah			(Belgium) Aristote Nkaka	
Jiangxi Dingnan United	(Brazil) Erikys	(Portugal) Tiago Fernandes	(Spain) David Mateos				
Liaoning Tieren	(Brazil) Felipe	(Republic of the Congo) Guy Mbenza	(Japan) Takahiro Kunimoto	(Chinese Taipei) Ange Kouamé			
Nantong Zhiyun	(Bulgaria) **Aleksandar Kolev**	(Serbia) Aleksandar Paločević	(Serbia) Igor Ivanović		(South Korea) → (China) Xu Hui^{2}		(Nigeria) Prince Lucky Ukachukwu
Nanjing City	(Bosnia and Herzegovina) Tarik Isić	(Nigeria) Moses Ogbu	(Portugal) Jucie Lupeta				(Hong Kong) Alexandre Dujardin
Qingdao Red Lions	(Brazil) Leandro Alves	(Brazil) Rivaldinho	(Portugal) João Nóbrega	(Chinese Taipei) Chen Hao-wei			
Shaanxi Union	(Austria) Constantin Reiner	(Kosovo) **Astrit Selmani**	(Netherlands) Rayan El Azrak	(Hong Kong) **Ma Hei Wai**			(Algeria) Oussama Darfalou
Shanghai Jiading Huilong	(England) Ashley Coffey	(Nigeria) Akinkunmi Amoo	(Serbia) **Andrija Luković**			(Brazil) Magno Cruz	
Shenzhen Juniors	(Democratic Republic of the Congo) Mayingila Nzuzi Mata	(England) Joel Nouble	(Serbia) Milan Marčić	(Hong Kong) **Clement Benhaddouche**			
Shijiazhuang Gongfu	(Brazil) Dankler	(Colombia) **Jasond González**	(Ecuador) José Ayoví	(Hong Kong) Yu Joy Yin			(Brazil) Olávio
Suzhou Dongwu	(Angola) Estrela	(Cape Verde) **Carlos Fortes**	(Serbia) Aleksandar Andrejević			(Serbia) Nemanja Čović	(Hong Kong) **Michael Udebuluzor**
Yanbian Longding	(Costa Rica) Felicio Brown Forbes	(Nigeria) **Prince Lucky Ukachukwu**	(Portugal) Joaquim Domingos	**(Hong Kong) Vas Nuñez**		(France) Chris Ondong Mba	

- **^1** For Hong Kong, Macau, or Taiwanese players, if they are non-naturalised and were registered as professional footballers in Hong Kong's, Macau's, or Chinese Taipei's football association for the first time, they are recognised as native players. Otherwise they are recognised as foreign players.
- **^2** Naturalised players whose parents or grandparents were born in mainland China, thus are regarded as local players.

== League table ==
Pos	Team	Pld	W	D	L	GF	GA	GD	Pts	Promotion, qualification or relegation
1	Liaoning Tieren (C, P)	30	20	8	2	64	27	+37	68	Promotion to Super League
2	Chongqing Tonglianglong (P)	30	18	6	6	52	32	+20	60 (Note: Head-to-head goal difference: Chongqing +3, GZ-Power -3)	Promotion to Super League
3	Guangdong GZ-Power	30	18	6	6	55	35	+20	60	
4	Yanbian Longding	30	16	7	7	43	25	+18	55	
5	Shijiazhuang Gongfu	30	12	11	7	39	31	+8	47	
6	Jiangxi Dingnan United	30	11	11	8	40	35	+5	44	
7	Nantong Zhiyun	30	12	7	11	44	31	+13	43	
8	Dalian K'un City	30	11	9	10	42	38	+4	42	
9	Shaanxi Union	30	10	9	11	48	47	+1	39	
10	Suzhou Dongwu	30	9	11	10	25	28	−3	38	
11	Nanjing City	30	9	9	12	40	48	−8	36	
12	Shanghai Jiading Huilong	30	8	6	16	26	44	−18	30	
13	Foshan Nanshi	30	7	8	15	27	49	−22	29	
14	Shenzhen Juniors	30	8	4	18	38	60	−22	28	
15	Guangxi Pingguo	30	6	7	17	24	47	−23	25	Disqualified
16	Qingdao Red Lions (R)	30	2	7	21	20	50	−30	13	Relegation to League Two

Source: Soccerway
Rules for classification:
- During season: 1) Points; 2) Head-to-head points; 3) Head-to-head goal difference; 4) Head-to-head goals scored; 5) Goal difference; 6) Goals scored; 7) Rankings in the previous season. (Rules 2 to 4 are only applied when teams concerned have finished both/all the matches against others.)
- After season: 1) Points; 2) Head-to-head points; 3) Head-to-head goal difference; 4) Head-to-head goals scored; 5) Goal difference; 6) Goals scored; 7) Disciplinary points (yellow card = 1 point, red card = 3 points); 8) Drawing of lots.
  (C) Champions; (P) Promoted; (R) Relegated
  Notes:

== Results ==
Home \ Away	CQT	DKC	FSN	GZP	GXP	JDU	LNT	NJC	NTZ	QRL	SXU	SJH	SZJ	SJZ	SZD	YBL
Chongqing Tonglianglong	—	1–1	2–0	0–1	0–0	2–1	2–1	1–0	0–2	1–1	2–1	4–0	2–1	0–0	0–0	1–0
Dalian K'un City	1–2	—	1–0	0–2	2–1	2–1	1–1	3–1	1–1	2–1	3–0	1–2	2–1	3–1	0–0	0–0
Foshan Nanshi	1–1	2–0	—	2–3	1–2	0–0	0–2	1–3	1–1	1–1	2–1	2–1	2–1	0–0	0–2	2–2
Guangdong GZ-Power	1–5	2–2	2–0	—	0–1	0–1	0–2	4–1	3–1	0–0	2–2	2–0	1–0	2–0	3–2	4–0
Guangxi Pingguo	1–2	1–1	0–1	1–3	—	3–1	0–3	0–1	1–2	1–0	0–0	2–1	3–2	1–4	0–0	0–2
Jiangxi Dingnan United	3–1	2–1	3–0	1–1	2–2	—	3–3	2–1	1–1	1–0	2–0	0–1	1–1	2–2	3–1	2–1
Liaoning Tieren	4–2	2–1	5–0	2–2	1–0	0–0	—	1–1	1–0	2–1	2–1	3–0	7–1	1–0	2–0	2–1
Nanjing City	0–1	1–2	1–1	2–4	2–1	2–0	1–1	—	0–0	2–0	3–3	1–1	3–0	1–3	2–1	1–1
Nantong Zhiyun	2–4	2–0	2–0	0–1	3–0	1–1	2–2	0–1	—	7–1	1–1	1–0	5–0	0–2	2–0	0–1
Qingdao Red Lions	3–4	0–0	0–1	2–4	1–1	0–2	1–3	2–3	0–1	—	1–1	1–0	0–2	0–1	0–1	1–1
Shaanxi Union	0–3	2–1	3–1	1–2	5–1	3–1	3–1	1–1	3–2	2–0	—	3–1	3–2	0–1	1–3	0–1
Shanghai Jiading Huilong	0–2	3–0	2–1	2–2	3–1	0–2	0–3	1–1	0–1	2–0	2–4	—	2–1	0–2	0–0	0–0
Shenzhen Juniors	0–3	1–3	2–1	2–1	2–0	1–1	2–3	4–3	0–3	2–1	3–3	1–2	—	4–0	0–2	2–1
Shijiazhuang Gongfu	3–1	2–2	2–2	1–2	1–0	1–1	1–2	2–0	3–1	0–2	1–1	0–0	1–0	—	1–1	2–0
Suzhou Dongwu	1–3	0–4	0–1	0–1	0–0	1–0	1–1	1–0	2–0	1–0	0–0	2–0	0–0	1–1	—	1–1
Yanbian Longding	3–0	3–2	4–1	2–0	1–0	3–0	0–1	6–1	1–0	1–0	2–0	1–0	1–0	1–1	2–1	—

Source: Soccerway
Legend: Blue = home team win; Yellow = draw; Red = away team win.
For upcoming matches, an "a" indicates there is an article about the rivalry between the two participants.

== Positions by round ==
To preserve chronological evolvements, any postponed matches are not included to the round at which they were originally scheduled, but added to the full round they were played immediately afterwards. For example, if a match is scheduled for round 7, but then played between rounds 8 and 9, it will be added to the standings for round 8.

Team ╲ Round	1	2	3	4	5	6	7	8	9	10	11	12	13	14	15	16	17	18	19	20	21	22	23	24	25	26	27	28	29	30
Liaoning Tieren	2	6	4	3	2	2	2	2	2	2	2	1	1	1	1	1	1	1	1	1	1	1	1	1	1	1	1	1	1	1
Chongqing Tonglianglong	8	5	2	2	1	1	1	1	1	1	1	2	2	2	2	2	2	2	2	2	2	2	2	2	2	2	2	2	2	2
Guangdong GZ-Power	1	1	1	4	4	4	3	5	3	4	3	3	3	3	3	3	4	4	4	4	3	3	3	3	3	3	3	3	3	3
Yanbian Longding	16	14	16	16	14	9	10	8	10	8	6	6	5	5	4	4	3	3	3	3	4	4	4	4	4	4	4	4	4	4
Shijiazhuang Gongfu	6	2	3	1	3	3	4	3	4	3	4	4	4	4	5	5	5	5	5	5	6	8	7	6	5	5	5	5	5	5
Jiangxi Dingnan United	7	13	14	9	9	7	11	12	12	13	13	13	13	13	13	12	10	8	7	7	8	7	6	8	7	7	7	7	6	6
Nantong Zhiyun	5	11	9	5	7	6	9	6	8	7	7	5	6	7	9	6	8	12	10	8	7	6	5	7	6	6	6	6	7	7
Dalian K'un City	3	10	8	10	12	11	6	10	7	6	8	8	9	12	10	7	6	6	6	6	5	5	8	5	8	8	8	8	8	8
Shaanxi Union	11	3	6	11	11	13	13	13	13	11	9	9	11	9	8	11	13	11	12	12	12	10	11	11	9	9	9	9	9	9
Suzhou Dongwu	10	4	5	6	5	5	5	4	5	5	5	7	7	8	11	8	9	10	11	11	11	12	10	9	10	10	11	11	11	10
Nanjing City	12	8	7	8	8	10	12	9	6	9	11	12	12	11	12	13	11	9	9	9	10	9	9	10	11	12	10	10	10	11
Shanghai Jiading Huilong	14	9	12	12	6	8	8	7	9	12	10	11	8	6	6	9	7	7	8	10	9	11	12	12	12	11	12	12	12	12
Foshan Nanshi	13	15	11	14	13	14	14	14	14	14	14	14	14	14	14	14	14	14	14	14	14	14	14	14	13	13	13	13	13	13
Shenzhen Juniors	4	7	13	7	10	12	7	11	11	10	12	10	10	10	7	10	12	13	13	13	13	13	13	13	14	14	14	14	14	14
Guangxi Pingguo	15	16	15	15	16	16	16	16	16	16	16	16	16	16	16	16	16	16	15	15	15	15	15	15	15	15	15	15	15	15
Qingdao Red Lions	9	12	10	13	15	15	15	15	15	15	15	15	15	15	15	15	15	15	16	16	16	16	16	16	16	16	16	16	16	16

Leader and promotion to Super League
Promotion to Super League
Relegation to League Two

Source: Soccerway

== Results by match played ==
Team ╲ Round	1	2	3	4	5	6	7	8	9	10	11	12	13	14	15	16	17	18	19	20	21	22	23	24	25	26	27	28	29	30
Chongqing Tonglianglong	D	W	W	W	W	W	W	W	W	D	D	D	L	W	W	W	L	W	W	L	W	L	L	L	W	W	W	D	D	W
Dalian K'un City	W	L	D	D	L	D	W	L	W	W	L	D	W	L	W	W	D	W	W	D	L	D	D	W	L	L	L	L	W	D
Foshan Nanshi	L	L	W	L	D	L	D	L	W	L	D	D	L	D	L	W	W	L	D	L	L	W	D	L	W	L	L	W	D	L
Guangdong GZ-Power	W	W	D	L	W	W	W	L	W	L	W	W	W	D	W	L	D	L	D	L	W	W	W	D	W	W	W	D	W	W
Guangxi Pingguo	L	L	D	L	L	D	L	L	L	D	W	L	L	L	D	L	L	D	W	W	W	D	L	W	L	D	L	L	W	L
Jiangxi Dingnan United	D	L	D	W	D	D	L	L	D	L	D	W	L	D	W	D	W	W	W	W	L	W	W	D	W	D	L	W	D	L
Liaoning Tieren	W	L	W	W	W	W	W	W	D	D	W	W	D	D	W	W	W	W	D	W	W	L	D	D	W	W	W	W	D	W
Nanjing City	L	W	D	D	D	L	L	W	W	L	L	L	W	D	D	L	W	W	D	D	L	W	D	L	L	L	W	W	D	L
Nantong Zhiyun	W	L	D	W	L	D	L	W	L	W	D	W	D	L	L	W	L	L	D	W	W	W	W	D	W	D	W	L	L	L
Qingdao Red Lions	D	D	D	L	L	L	D	L	W	L	L	D	L	D	L	L	L	L	L	W	L	L	L	L	L	D	L	L	L	L
Shaanxi Union	D	W	L	L	D	L	L	L	W	W	W	D	L	W	D	L	L	W	L	D	D	W	L	D	W	D	W	D	L	W
Shanghai Jiading Huilong	L	W	L	D	W	L	D	W	L	L	W	L	W	W	L	L	W	D	D	L	D	L	L	D	L	W	L	L	L	L
Shenzhen Juniors	W	L	L	W	L	L	W	L	L	W	L	W	D	D	W	L	L	L	L	L	W	L	L	L	L	D	L	L	D	W
Shijiazhuang Gongfu	D	W	W	W	D	W	L	W	L	W	L	L	W	D	L	D	W	D	D	D	D	L	W	W	W	L	W	D	D	D
Suzhou Dongwu	D	W	D	D	D	W	W	W	L	D	L	L	D	L	L	W	L	D	L	D	D	L	W	W	L	D	L	W	D	W
Yanbian Longding	L	D	L	L	W	W	D	W	L	W	W	D	W	W	D	W	W	L	D	D	L	W	W	W	L	D	W	W	W	W

Source: Soccerway
W = Win; D = Draw; L = Loss

== Statistics ==
=== Top scorers ===
As of 8 November 2025

Rank	Player	Club	Goals
1	(Republic of the Congo) Guy Mbenza	Liaoning Tieren	28
2	(Brazil) Erikys	Jiangxi Dingnan United	22
3	(Zimbabwe) Nyasha Mushekwi	Dalian K'un City	18
3	(Costa Rica) Felicio Brown Forbes	Yanbian Longding	18
3	(China) Xiang Yuwang	Chongqing Tonglianglong	18
6	(Brazil) Farley Rosa	Guangdong GZ-Power	14
7	(Brazil) João Carlos	Guangdong GZ-Power	13
8	(Chinese Taipei) Ange Kouamé	Liaoning Tieren	12
9	(Nigeria) Moses Ogbu	Nanjing City	11
10	(Brazil) Nikão	Guangdong GZ-Power	10
10	(China) Zang Yifeng	Liaoning Tieren	10
10	(Spain) José Ángel Carrillo	Chongqing Tonglianglong	10
10	(Brazil) Dominic Vinicius	Dalian K'un City	10
10	(England) Joel Nouble	Shenzhen Juniors	10
10	(England) Ashley Coffey	Shanghai Jiading Huilong	10

=== Hat-tricks ===
Player	For	Against	Result	Date
(Chinese Taipei) Ange Kouamé	Liaoning Tieren	Shenzhen Juniors	7-1 (H)	22 April 2025
(Republic of the Congo) Guy Mbenza	Liaoning Tieren	Jiangxi Dingnan United	3–3 (A)	17 May 2025

== Awards ==
=== Player of the Round ===
Player of the Round
Round	Player	Club	Ref.
1	(Brazil) João Carlos	Guangdong GZ-Power	
2	(China) Ruan Qilong	Chongqing Tonglianglong	
3	(Japan) Takahiro Kunimoto	Liaoning Tieren	
4	(China) Xiang Yuwang	Chongqing Tonglianglong	
5	(China) Xiang Yuwang (2)	Chongqing Tonglianglong	
6	(Republic of the Congo) Guy Mbenza	Liaoning Tieren	
7	(China) Huang Kaijun	Shenzhen Juniors	
8	(China) Dong Honglin	Nanjing City	
9	(Republic of the Congo) Guy Mbenza (2)	Liaoning Tieren	
10	(China) Huang Zhenfei	Yanbian Longding	
11	(England) Ashley Coffey	Shanghai Jiading Huilong	
12	(England) Joel Nouble	Shenzhen Juniors	
13			
14	(China) Xu Jizu	Yanbian Longding	
15	(China) Xiang Yuwang (3)	Chongqing Tonglianglong	
16	(Netherlands) Rodney Antwi	Foshan Nanshi	
17	(Brazil) Erikys	Jiangxi Dingnan United	
18	(China) Cui Ming'an	Dalian K'un City	
19	(Zimbabwe) Nyasha Mushekwi	Dalian K'un City	
20	(Nigeria) Moses Ogbu	Nanjing City	
21	(Chinese Taipei) Ange Kouamé	Liaoning Tieren	
22	(Brazil) Farley Rosa	Guangdong GZ-Power	
23	(Bulgaria) Aleksandar Kolev	Nantong Zhiyun	
24	(Costa Rica) Felicio Brown Forbes	Yanbian Longding	
25	(Serbia) Igor Ivanović	Nantong Zhiyun	
26	(Brazil) Nikão	Guangdong GZ-Power	
27	(Costa Rica) Felicio Brown Forbes (2)	Yanbian Longding	
28	(Brazil) Farley Rosa (2)	Guangdong GZ-Power	
29	(Brazil) Nikão (2)	Guangdong GZ-Power	
30			

=== Monthly awards ===
Month	Player of the Month		Manager of the Month		Young Player of the Month	
Month	Player	Club	Manager	Club	Player	Club
March/April	(China) Xiang Yuwang	Chongqing Tonglianglong	(Spain) Salva Suay	Chongqing Tonglianglong	(China) Fan Xulin	Suzhou Dongwu
May	(Zimbabwe) Nyasha Mushekwi	Dalian K'un City	(Spain) Salva Suay	Chongqing Tonglianglong	(China) Huang Kaijun	Shenzhen Juniors
June	(England) Joel Nouble	Shenzhen Juniors	(China) Li Jinyu	Liaoning Tieren	(China) Huang Chuqi	Foshan Nanshi
July	(China) Xiang Yuwang	Chongqing Tonglianglong	(China) Li Jinyu	Liaoning Tieren	(China) Lin Feiyang	Shenzhen Juniors
August	(Netherlands) Rodney Antwi	Foshan Nanshi	(Japan) Koji Maeda	Guangxi Pingguo	(China) Zhang Zhixiong	Chongqing Tonglianglong
September	(Brazil) Erikys	Jiangxi Dingnan United	(South Korea) Lee Ki-hyung	Guangxi Pingguo	(China) Chen Yongze	Liaoning Tieren

== League attendance ==
Pos	Team	Total	High	Low	Average	Change
1	Liaoning Tieren	299,561	39,868	10,012	27,233	+84.6%
2	Shaanxi Union	165,032	22,323	8,651	16,503	−6.2%^{††}
3	Yanbian Longding	175,741	28,091	4,380	15,976	+51.1%
4	Chongqing Tonglianglong	138,102	14,133	11,863	12,555	+34.7%
5	Nantong Zhiyun	114,172	20,985	7,136	11,417	−20.8%^{†}
6	Guangxi Pingguo	76,306	15,047	4,158	6,937	−59.5%
7	Shijiazhuang Gongfu	72,005	10,361	4,813	6,546	−4.0%
8	Jiangxi Dingnan United	60,023	9,431	1,849	6,002	−20.4%^{†††}
9	Suzhou Dongwu	59,146	10,326	2,811	5,915	+7.4%
10	Dalian K'un City	47,908	8,926	1,836	4,355	+231.2%^{††}
11	Guangdong GZ-Power	36,499	4,765	728	3,650	+407.6%^{††}
12	Nanjing City	30,357	4,633	1,677	3,036	+5.5%
13	Foshan Nanshi	32,393	4,369	1,368	2,945	−24.4%
14	Qingdao Red Lions	19,901	3,258	1,041	1,990	+9.0%
15	Shenzhen Juniors	17,288	3,988	852	1,729	+111.1%^{††}
16	Shanghai Jiading Huilong	13,997	2,813	673	1,272	+7.8%
	League total	1,355,128	39,868	673	8,115	−14.8%

Updated to games played on 6 September 2025
Notes:
^{†} Teams played previous season in CSL.
^{††} Teams played previous season in CL2.
^{†††} Team relocated from Harbin, Heilongjiang to Dingnan County, Ganzhou, Jiangxi.
