= Tiago André =

Tiago André may refer to:

- Tiago André (footballer, born 1983), Portuguese footballer who plays as a forward
- Tiago André (footballer, born 1997), Portuguese footballer who plays as a left-back
