= Penedo, Alagoas =

Municipality of Alagoas, Brazil

Penedo
- Municipality
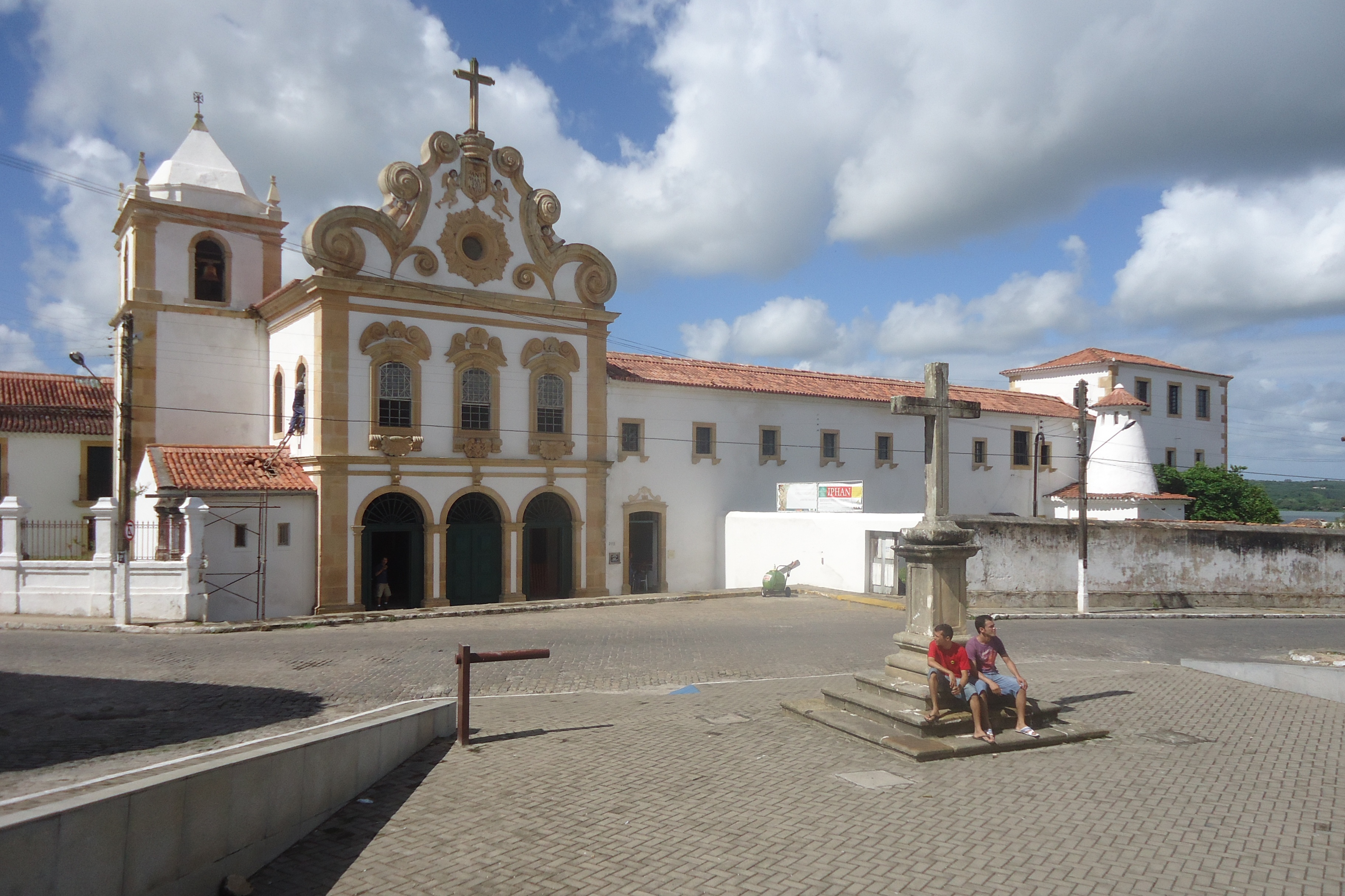
- Church of Santa Maria dos Anjos and the Convent of São Francisco

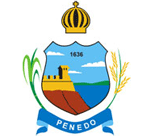
- Flag Coat of arms

- Location in Alagoas state

- Location in Brazil
- Coordinates: 10°17′24″S 36°35′09″W
- Country: Brazil
- Region: Northeast
- State: Alagoas

Area
  - Total: 689.88 km^{2} (266.36 sq mi)

Population (2020)
  - Total: 63,846
  - Density: 92.547/km^{2} (239.69/sq mi)
- Time zone: UTC−3 (BRT)
- Website: Official website

Penedo (Brazilian Portuguese pronunciation: [pẽˈnedu]) is a municipality in the state of Alagoas in Brazil. The population is 63,846 (2020 est.) in an area of 689.88 square kilometres (266.36 sq mi). Penedo lies 173 kilometres (107 mi) south-west of the state capital of Maceió.

In October 2023, Penedo joined the UNESCO Creative Cities Network and was named a UNESCO City of Film.

== History ==
Founded in 1614, Penedo has many important examples of Portuguese and Dutch colonial architectures. The history of Penedo can be found in Francisco Alberto Sales's book Arruando para o Forte. It was reached by sea from the wide estuary of the São Francisco River.

The unclassified extinct Wakoná language was formerly spoken in Penedo. Loukotka (1968) reported that the remaining ethnic descendants who speak only Portuguese could be found in the city of Porto Real do Colégio.

== Architectural heritage ==
Among its historically significant buildings are its well preserved churches, which were built through the 18th century. Some of these include:

- Convento de São Francisco e Igreja de Nossa Senhora dos Anjos
  (Convent of Saint Francis and Church of Our Lady of the Angels)
- Igreja de Nossa Senhora da Corrente
  (Church of Our Lady of the Chains)
- Catedral de Nossa Senhora do Rosário dos Pretos, Cathedral of the Roman Catholic Diocese of Penedo.
  (Cathedral of Our Lady of the Black People's Rosary)

The Casa do Penedo, built in 1974, has as its objective the preservation of the city's artistic and cultural patrimony. In the Casa do Penedo one can find a rich quantity of five centuries of creativity by residents of the São Francisco River Valley.

== In literature ==
Penedo is the location in The Far Side of the World, a novel by Patrick O'Brian set in the era when both the War of 1812 and the Napoleonic Wars were underway, where HMS Surprise pulls in for repairs. The ship stays longer than expected when she gets stuck in the river due to its rapidly changing tides.

== See also ==
- Penedo, Itatiaia, a touristic district of Itatiaia, RJ. A former Finnish colony.
