= Liu Aifeng =

Liu Aifeng (1908 - January 20, 2002, Chinese: 刘皑风), born in Renqiu, Hebei, was a member of the Chinese Communist Party and a prominent pioneer in China's educational development.

== Biography ==
In 1932, Liu Aifeng obtained a degree from the Department of Chinese Literature at National Beiping Normal University, subsequently teaching in the Second Normal School of Chahar Province and the Third Middle School of Hebei Province. Subsequent to the July 7th Incident, Liu returned to his native region to disseminate anti-Japanese publicity. In February 1938, he assumed the role of head of the Civilian Movement Section within the Fifth Route. By April 1938, Renqiu County established an anti-Japanese democratic government, with Liu appointed as the county chief. In August 1938, Liu was reassigned as the county chief of the anti-Japanese democratic government in Dingnan County.

In September 1938, Liu Aifeng departed from Dingnan County and commenced his educational career, serving as the director of the Jizhong Administration of the Education Department Supervisor, the Education Section of the Jinchahi Border Region Administrative Committee, and as Director of Education, among other roles. Liu Aifeng became a member of the Chinese Communist Party in July 1946.

Following the establishment of the People's Republic of China, Liu assumed the role of director of the General Office of the Ministry of Education, served as a member of the party group, held the position of deputy minister of the Ministry of Higher Education, directed the Bureau of Culture and Education Planning of the State Planning Commission, acted as deputy minister of the Ministry of Education, and participated as a member of the party group as well as in the second, third, and fourth sessions of the Chinese People's Political Consultative Conference.

During the Cultural Revolution, Liu Aifeng experienced trauma, and upon returning to work, he held positions as the head of the Science and Education Group of the State Council, a member of the Provisional Leading Group of the Ministry of Education, and a consultant for the Ministry of Education, concluding his service in August 1995. Liu Aifeng died in Beijing on January 20, 2002, at the age of 94 due to sickness.
