= Armindo Freitas-Magalhães =

Portuguese psychologist (born 1966)

Armindo Freitas-Magalhães (pronounced [ɐɾˈmĩdu ˈfɾɐjtɐʒ mɐɣɐˈʎɐ̃jʃ]; born 1966) is a Portuguese psychologist working on the psychology of the human smile in the context of emotion and facial expression. His research and clinical-forensic expertise includes investigative interviewing, credibility assessment, forensic assessment, facial expression of emotion and variables associated with eyewitness memory in victims and offenders of crime and trauma. He has also provided consultation and training overseas.

== Biography ==
Freitas-Magalhães was born in Fornelos, Norte region, Portugal. He studied at the University of Coimbra, and he did a Ph.D. in psychology at Universidade Aberta, Lisbon. He is the author of the book "The Psychology of Human Smile". Since 2006 he is Professor of the Psychology of Emotions, Psychology and Law, Applied Psychology and Experimental Psychology at University Fernando Pessoa (UFP), in Porto. He is founder and current director of the Facial Emotion Expression Lab (FEELab) at that university. He is fellow of several international scientific societies (e.g. American Psychological Association, Association for Psychological Science, Society for Personality and Social Psychology, International Society for Research on Emotions, International Brain Research Organization, International Neuropsychological Society and European Health Psychology Society), as well as being member of several literary societies. His studies focus on the recognition from basic emotions, particularly the smile. He founded the National Front for the Defense of Culture (Lisbon, 1992) with among others José Saramago. He lives in Porto with his wife, Ana, and son, Gonçalo.

== Work ==
His research is devoted to understanding emotions in individuals and society. Among Freitas-Magalhães's professional interests are physiological psychology, psychology of emotions, facial emotion expression and human-computer interaction, human smile and cross-cultural nonverbal behavior. During the last twenty years his principal research has been on human emotions and the influence of smile on emotional disorders such as depression. More recently he has conducted research on the cognitive and emotional processes of reading human faces. Freitas-Magalhães is the author of several IT applications and interfaces in relation to emotions and facial expression.

He is the author of more than 100 articles, empirical reports, research reviews and theorical papers, as well as attendee to conferences, and has written six books on psychology. Freitas-Magalhães is also the author of 11 novels and has published poetry. The common theme of his research and fiction is on furthering our understandings of interactions within complex systems, especially complex emotional systems. Freitas-Magalhães's theories of fiction includes the idea that novels and poetry are simulations that run not on machines but on our minds. His books have been translated into several languages.

Freitas-Magalhães is the author of FACE, a scientific project in Portugal that will allow neuropsychological mapping of the Portuguese facial expression. The FACE imaging technology will contribute to a database of facial expression available for the most diverse social applications, such as health, justice and education. He is the author of "A decade of smile in Portugal" (2003–2013). He is the author "ForensicPsy" on the assessment and measurement on emotion facial expression of offenders for the criminal investigation and judicial proceedings (2009).

As of 2009, he is the leader of the international scientific project "The Brain and The Face".

== Awards and media attention ==
He was distinguished for Scientific Contribution by the UK Government within the "Global Partnership Programme" (2008), Scientific Contribution by Instituto Nokia de Tecnologia (2008), Scientific Contribution by “Alive Science” (2007) and “Scientist Generation” (2006) (RTP, Lisbon - Radio and Television of Portugal) and “Portuguese par Excellence” (2003) (TSF, Lisbon).

Besides national Portuguese media attention, his research has received international press attention. (e.g., in the European Herald Tribune and The Australian News).

== Educational innovations ==
=== F-M FACS 3.0 ===
The F-M Facial Action Coding System 3.0 (F-M FACS 3.0) was created in 2018 by Dr. Freitas-Magalhães, and presents 4,000 segments in 4K, using 3D technology and automatic and real-time recognition (FaceReader 7.1).

=== F-M FACS 2.0 ===
The pioneer F-M Facial Action Coding System 2.0 (F-M FACS 2.0) was created in 2017 by Dr. Freitas-Magalhães, and presents 2,000 segments in 4K, using 3D technology and automatic and real-time recognition.

=== Psychopathy ===
He is the author of the scientific project "Psychopathy and Emotions in Portugal" (2010) with the aim of understanding the brain processes involved in neuropsychophysiological reactions of facial expression of emotion, learn why the pattern of negative emotionality are common in the psychopathy, if there are gender and age differences and look for the organic and environmental issues involved and set a standard that allows the treatment and prophylaxis of crime. To verify and analyze the brains of psychopaths and the ratio for the facial expression will be used magnetic resonance imaging (fMRI), neurofunctional psychometry and IT platforms that stimulate the brain systems, particularly the limbic system.

=== Emotional literacy ===
Freitas-Magalhães is the creator of the emotional literacy project called "If I Say That Sometimes The Flowers Smile" based on a verse of Fernando Pessoa and released to commemorate the bicentenary of Charles Darwin´s birth. The aim of this project is to facilitate the identification, recognition, regulation and use of emotions in various psychosocial contexts, such as schools (from kindergarten), public and private health, the host social institutions and justice organizations.

According to Freitas-Magalhães, "education assertion of emotional states, contributed, decisively, from childhood, to pursue the happiness and good practice, and therefore decreased the clinical symptoms, violence, stress, drug and alcohol abuse".
