= Freitas (Portugal) =

Coordinates: 41.513°N 8.211°W

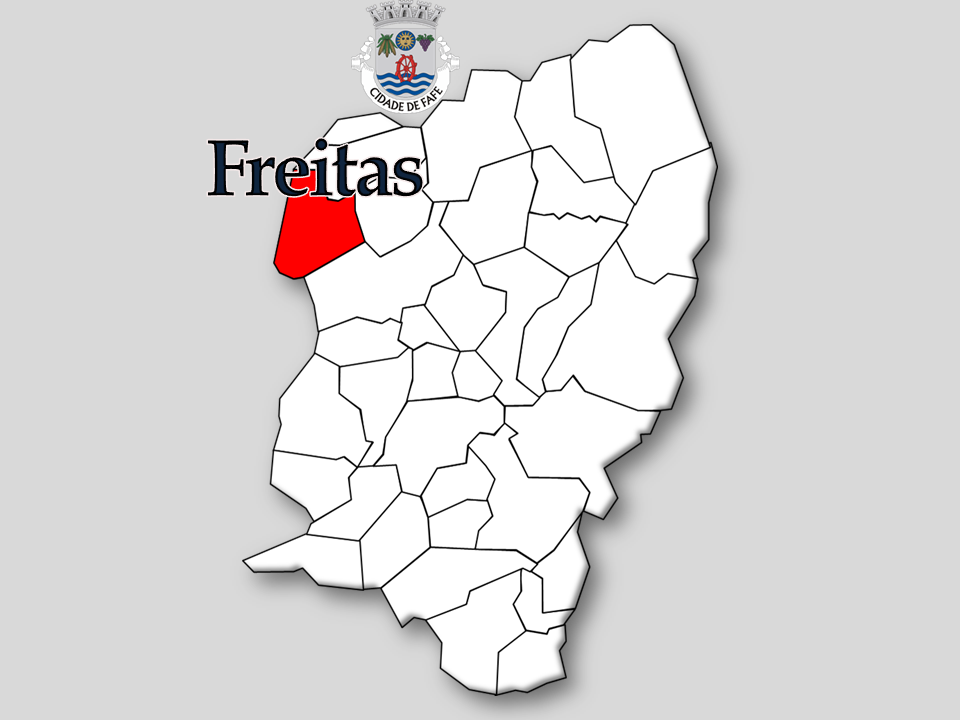

Freitas is a village and a former civil parish in the municipality of Fafe, Portugal. In 2013, the parish merged into the new parish Freitas e Vila Cova.

The civil parish has an area 6,24 km^{2}, with 745 inhabitants for a density of 119,4 people/km² (2001 census).

The first lord of the village, a contemporary of the first king of Portugal, around 1164, became known as João das Freitas, hence initiating the surname Freitas.

In an adjacent civil parish, Travassós, there is a second, smaller village named Freitas. A small family's last name originates from this village with the last name:Freyta
