= Vasco Cruz =

Portuguese footballer

Personal information
- Full name: Vasco Daniel Ribeiro Cruz
- Date of birth: 11 August 1994 (age 32)
- Place of birth: Fafe, Portugal
- Height: 1.70 m (5 ft 7 in)
- Position: Right back

Team information
- Current team: Pevidém

Youth career
- 2005–2009: Ases S. Jorge
- 2009–2013: Fafe

Senior career*
| Years | Team | Apps | (Gls) |
| 2012–2017 | Fafe | 116 | (2) |
| 2017–2018 | Varzim | 0 | (0) |
| 2017–2018 | → Merelinense (loan) | 27 | (0) |
| 2018–2019 | Fafe | 4 | (0) |
| 2019–2021 | São Martinho | 37 | (3) |
| 2021– | Pevidém | 3 | (0) |
- * Club domestic league appearances and goals as of 4 September 2021

Vasco Daniel Ribeiro Cruz (born 11 August 1994 in Fafe) is a Portuguese footballer who plays for AR São Martinho as a defender.

== Club career ==
On 31 July 2016, Cruz made his professional debut with Fafe in a 2016–17 Taça da Liga match against Vizela.
