= Institute of Higher Studies of Fafe =

Coordinates: 41.4637051°N 8.1561452°W

IESF - Instituto de Estudos Superios de Fafe is an institute of higher education formed in 1985, in Fafe, Portugal.

== Faculties ==
School of Education:

- Bachelor's degrees
  - Elementary Education, Physical Education and Sports, Senior Education
- Master's degrees
  - Preschool Education, Education in Elementary School
- Postgraduate
  - Special Education-cognitive-motor domain,
  - Nursery - Development, Education and Care,
  - Physical Activity in Gerontology,
  - Fitness center activities and Exersice Prescription

School of Technology

- Bachelor's degrees
  - Informatics Management
  - Accounting
  - Tourism
  - Management

== See also ==
- List of colleges and universities in Portugal
- Higher education in Portugal
