= Freitas e Vila Cova =

- Civil parish
- Location in Portugal
- Coordinates: 41.513°N 8.211°W
- Country: Portugal
- Region: Norte
- Intermunic. comm.: Ave
- District: Braga
- Municipality: Fafe

Area
  - Total: 11.48 km^{2} (4.43 sq mi)

Population (2011)
  - Total: 804
  - Density: 70/km^{2} (180/sq mi)
- Time zone: UTC+00:00 (WET)
  - Summer (DST): UTC+01:00 (WEST)

Freitas e Vila Cova is a civil parish in the northern Portuguese municipality of Fafe, in the district of Braga.

== History ==
The population in 2011 of the former civil parishes included 804 inhabitants, in an area of approximately 11.48 square kilometres (4.43 sq mi).

It was formed in 2013 through the merger of the former-parishes of Freitas and Vila Cova.

== Architecture ==
=== Civic ===
- Freitas Primary School Portuguese: Escola Primária de Freitas)

=== Religious ===
- Chapel of Santa Marinha (Portuguese: Capela de Santa Marinha)
- Chapel of Santo António (Portuguese: Capela de Santo António)
