= Dominic Vinicius =

Brazilian footballer (born 1995)

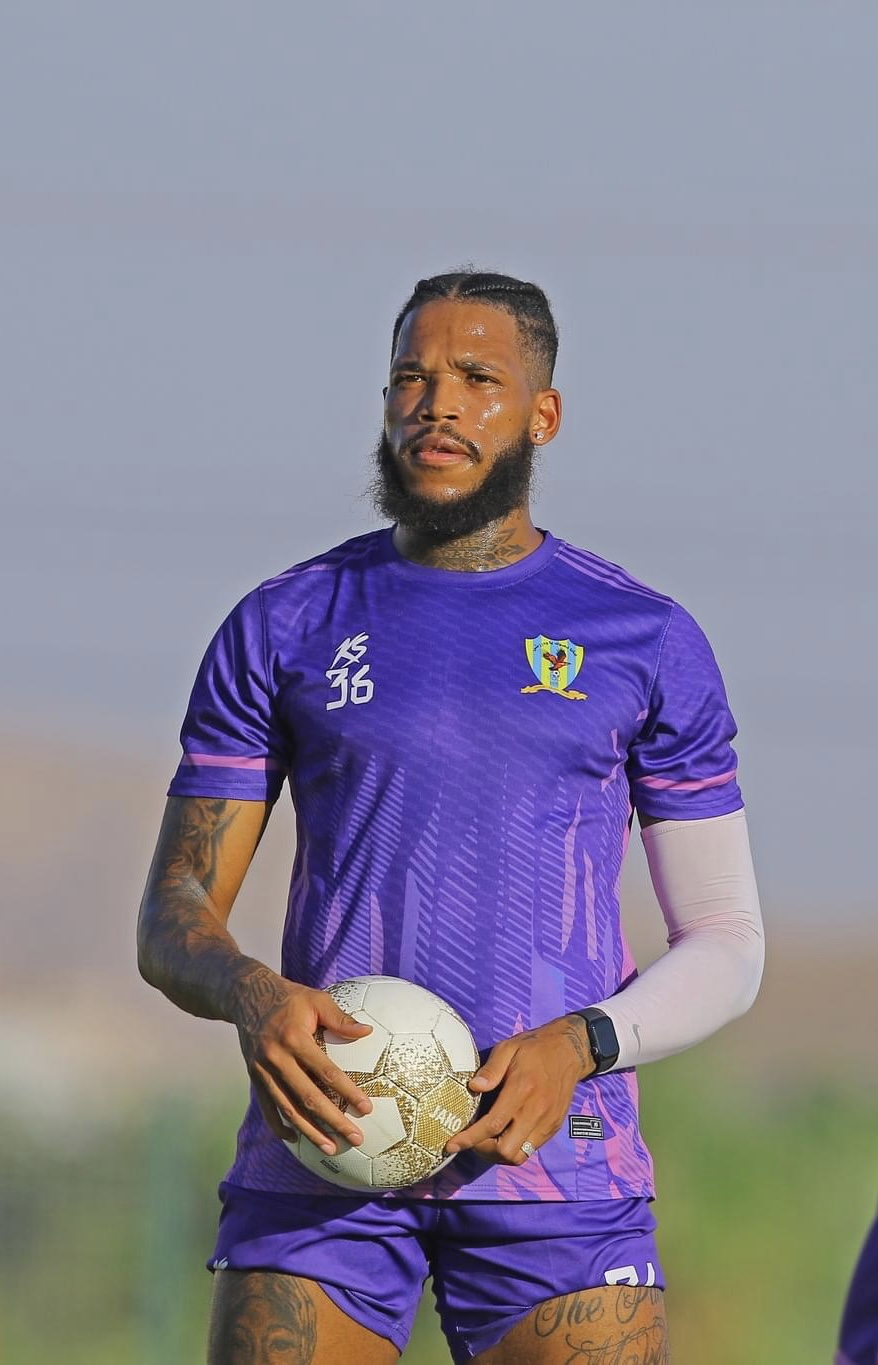
- Dominic Vinicius in 2023

Personal information
- Full name: Dominic Vinícius Eberechukwu Uzoukwu
- Date of birth: 5 January 1995 (age 31)
- Place of birth: São Paulo, Brazil
- Height: 1.94 m (6 ft 4 in)
- Position: Forward

Team information
- Current team: Shijiazhuang Gongfu

Youth career
- Corinthians
- –2012: Grêmio Osasco Audax
- 2012–2014: Athletico Paranaense

Senior career*
Years	Team	Apps	(Gls)
2014–2016	Athletico Paranaense	5	(0)
2015	→ Cuiabá (loan)	0	(0)
2016	→ Portuguesa (loan)	2	(0)
2016–2018	Vejle	44	(24)
2018–2020	Beijing BSU	34	(16)
2021–2022	Vejle	1	(0)
2022–2023	Heilongjiang Ice City	19	(8)
2023	Nam Dinh FC	9	(1)
2024	Shanghai Jiading Huilong	28	(10)
2025	Hwaseong FC	11	(0)
2025	Dalian K'un City	18	(10)
2026–	Shijiazhuang Gongfu	0	(0)
- * Club domestic league appearances and goals as of 31 December 2025 (UTC)

Dominic Vinícius Eberechukwu Uzoukwu (born 5 January 1995), commonly known as Dominic Vinicius, is a Brazilian footballer who plays as a forward. He also holds Nigerian citizenship.

== Club career ==
On 8 February 2024, Dominic Vinicius returned to China and signed a contract with China League One club Shanghai Jiading Huilong.

On 26 January 2026, Dominic Vinicius joined China League One club Shijiazhuang Gongfu.

== Career statistics ==
=== Club ===
As of match played 31 December 2025.

Appearances and goals by club, season and competition
Club	Season	League			State League		Cup		Other		Total	
Club	Season	Division	Apps	Goals	Apps	Goals	Apps	Goals	Apps	Goals	Apps	Goals
Athletico Paranaense	2014	Série A	0	0	5 (Note: Appearances in the Campeonato Paranaense)	0	0	0	0	0	5	0
Cuiabá (loan)	2015	Série C	0	0	0	0	0	0	0	0	0	0
Portuguesa (loan)	2016	Série C	0	0	2 (Note: Appearances in the Campeonato Paulista A2)	0	0	0	—		2	0
Vejle	2016–17	1st Division	28	15	—		0	0	—		28	15
Vejle	2017–18	1st Division	16	9	—		0	0	—		16	9
Vejle	Total		44	24	—		0	0	—		44	24
Beijing BSU	2018	China League One	28	15	—		0	0	—		28	15
Beijing BSU	2019	China League One	5	1	—		0	0	—		5	1
Beijing BSU	2020	China League One	1	0	—		—		—		1	0
Beijing BSU	Total		34	16	—		0	0	—		34	16
Vejle	2021–22	Danish Superliga	1	0	—		0	0	—		1	0
Heilongjiang Ice City	2022	China League One	19	8	—		0	0	—		19	8
Nam Dinh FC	2023	V.League 1	9	1	—		1	0	—		10	1
Shanghai Jiading Huilong	2024	China League One	28	10	—		0	0	—		28	10
Hwaseong FC	2025	K League 2	11	0	—		0	0	—		11	0
Dalian K'un City	2025	China League One	18	10	—		—		—		18	10
Career total			164	69	7	0	1	0	0	0	172	69

== Personal life ==
Born in Brazil, Dominic Vinicius is of Nigerian descent through his father.
