= Casa do Penedo =

Architectural monument in Portugal

- Casa do Penedo
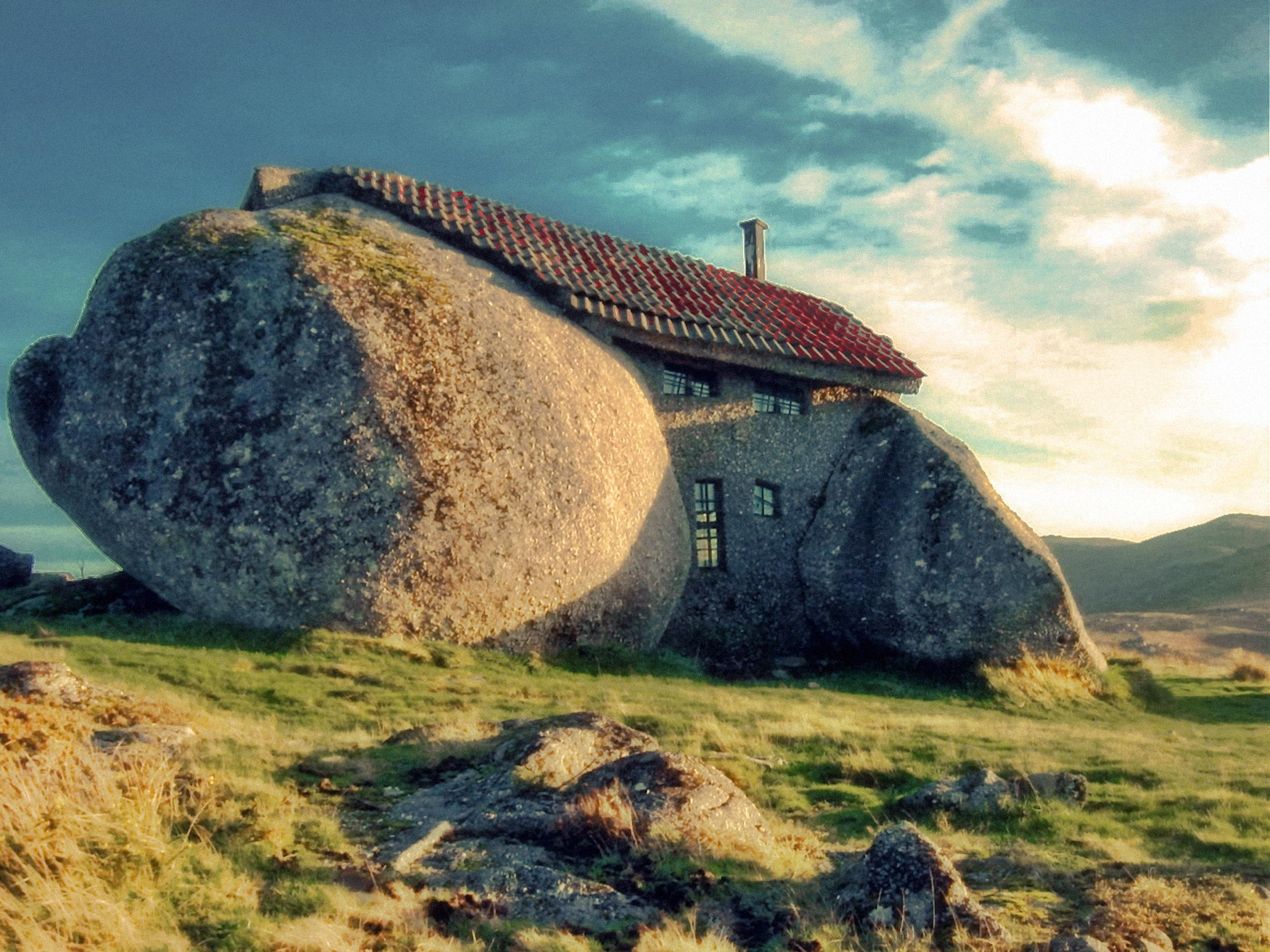
- Casa do Penedo, back view

- Location in Portugal

General information
- Status: Museum
- Type: Stone house / architectural monument
- Location: Between Celorico de Basto and Fafe, northern Portugal
- Coordinates: 41.4882°N 8.0677°W
- Construction started: 1972
- Completed: 1974

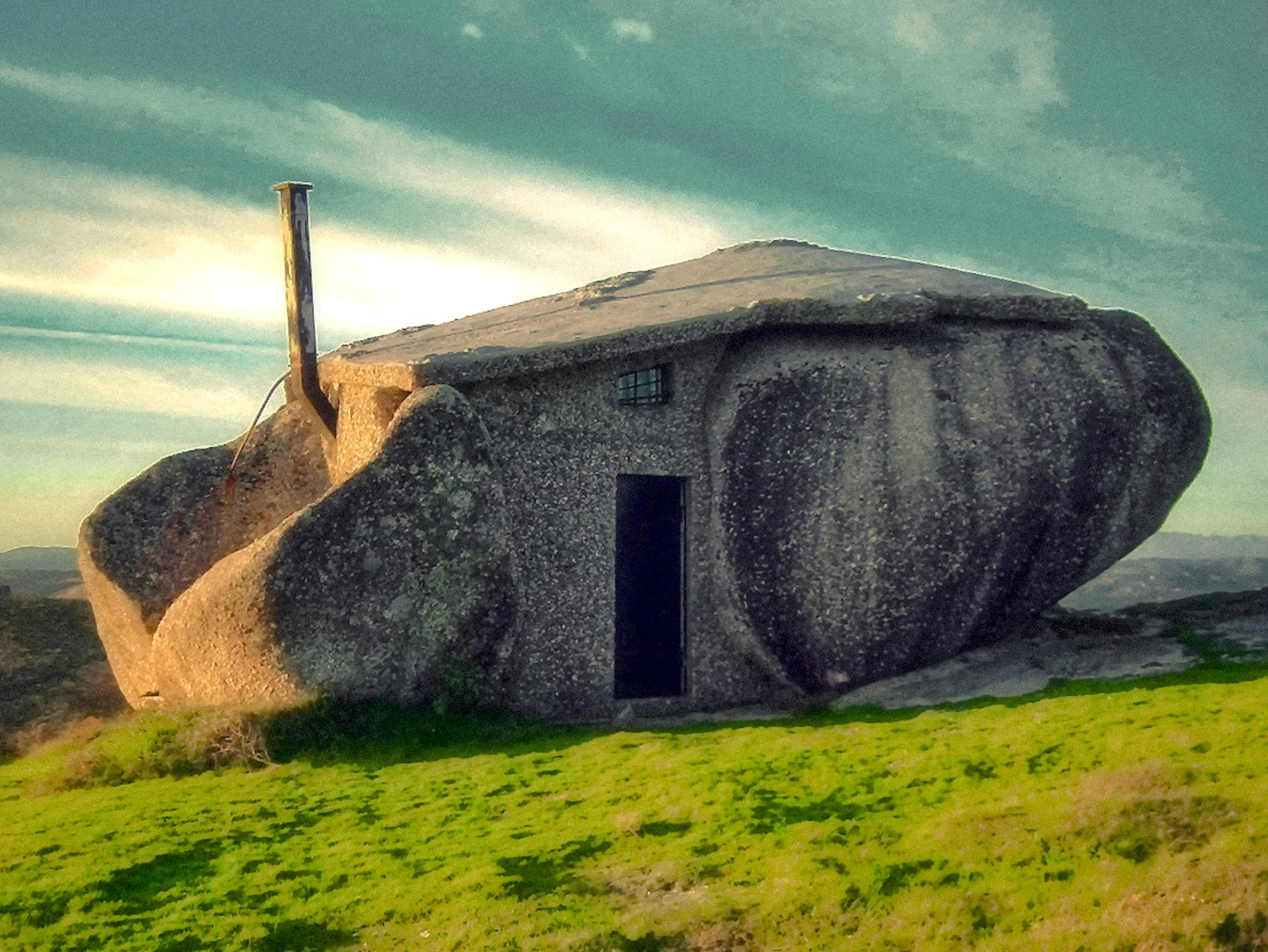
Casa do Penedo, front view

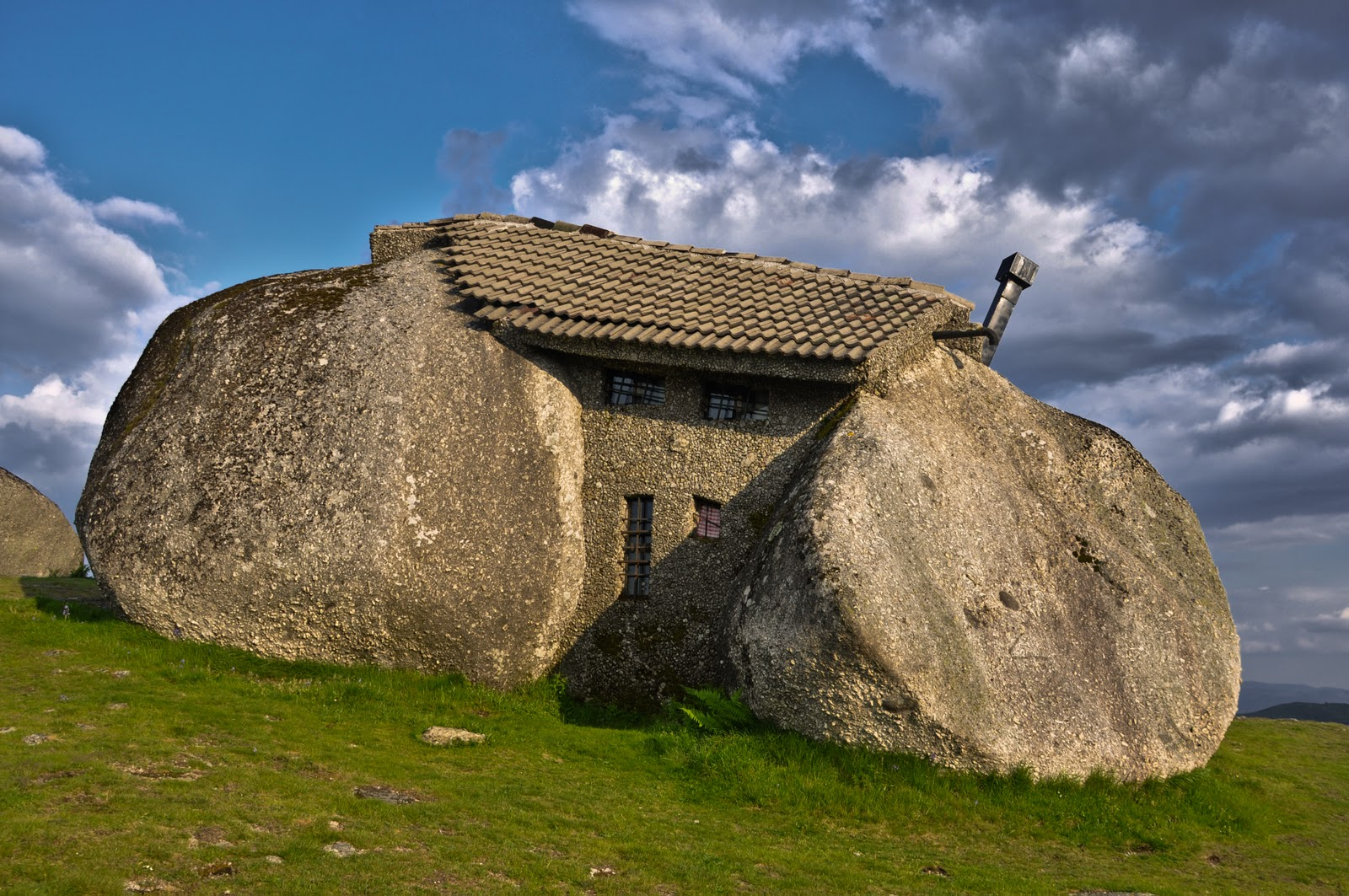
Casa do Penedo, alternative back view

Casa do Penedo (Portuguese for Stone House or House of the Rock) is an architectural monument located between Celorico de Basto and Fafe, in northern Portugal. It received its name because it was built from four large boulders that serve as the foundation, walls and ceiling of the house.

== History ==
The house is located between the Marão mountain range, Senhora da Graça and the mountains of Sameiro (Braga) and Penha (Guimarães), at the intersection of the parishes of Várzea Cova and Moreira do Rei, in the so-called Serras de Fafe.

Its construction began in 1972 and lasted about two years until its completion in 1974.

The residence was initially used by the owners as a holiday destination. Today Casa do Penedo is a small museum of relics and photographs from the house's history.

The building is located near a wind farm, although there is no electricity supply to the house itself. Due to its unusual design and integration into the surrounding nature, the building has become a growing tourist attraction.
