= Francisco Castro (footballer, born 1979) =

Portuguese footballer

Personal information
- Full name: Francisco Miguel Meireles Von Doellinger Castro
- Date of birth: 3 June 1979 (age 47)
- Place of birth: Fafe, Portugal
- Height: 1.84 m (6 ft 1/2 in)
- Position: Midfielder

Youth career
- 1990–1993: Fafe
- 1993–1994: Braga
- 1994–1998: Fafe

Senior career*
Years	Team	Apps	(Gls)
1998–2003	Fafe	85	(10)
2003–2006	Moreirense	34	(1)
2006–2007	Estrela Amadora	0	(0)
2006–2007	→ Maia (loan)	21	(5)
2007–2008	Aves	23	(3)
2008–2009	Gondomar	26	(3)
2009–2013	Moreirense	70	(14)
Total		259	(36)
- * Club domestic league appearances and goals

Francisco Miguel Meireles Von Doellinger Castro (born 3 June 1979 in Fafe, Braga District) is a Portuguese former professional footballer who played as a midfielder.
