= Instituto de Desenvolvimento Tecnológico =

Brazilian research organization

Instituto de Desenvolvimento Tecnológico (English: Institute of Development and Technology) (previously Instituto Nokia de Tecnologia / Nokia Institute of Technology), usually referred to as INDT, is a nonprofit organization focused on research and development of mobile software and telecommunication technology. INDT (then stylized as INdT) was founded by Nokia in October 2001 in Brazil with incentive funds from the Brazilian Law on Information Technology. Since Microsoft's acquisition of Nokia Mobile and its divesting of the investment, INDT is fully independent from Nokia and receives funding from services provided to clients and from fiscal exemption benefits established by the Brazilian Law of Information Technology. As of 2022 INDT has two R&D centers in Brazil (located in Brasília and Manaus).
