= Jiading Stadium =

Football stadium in Jiading, Shanghai, China

- 嘉定体育场
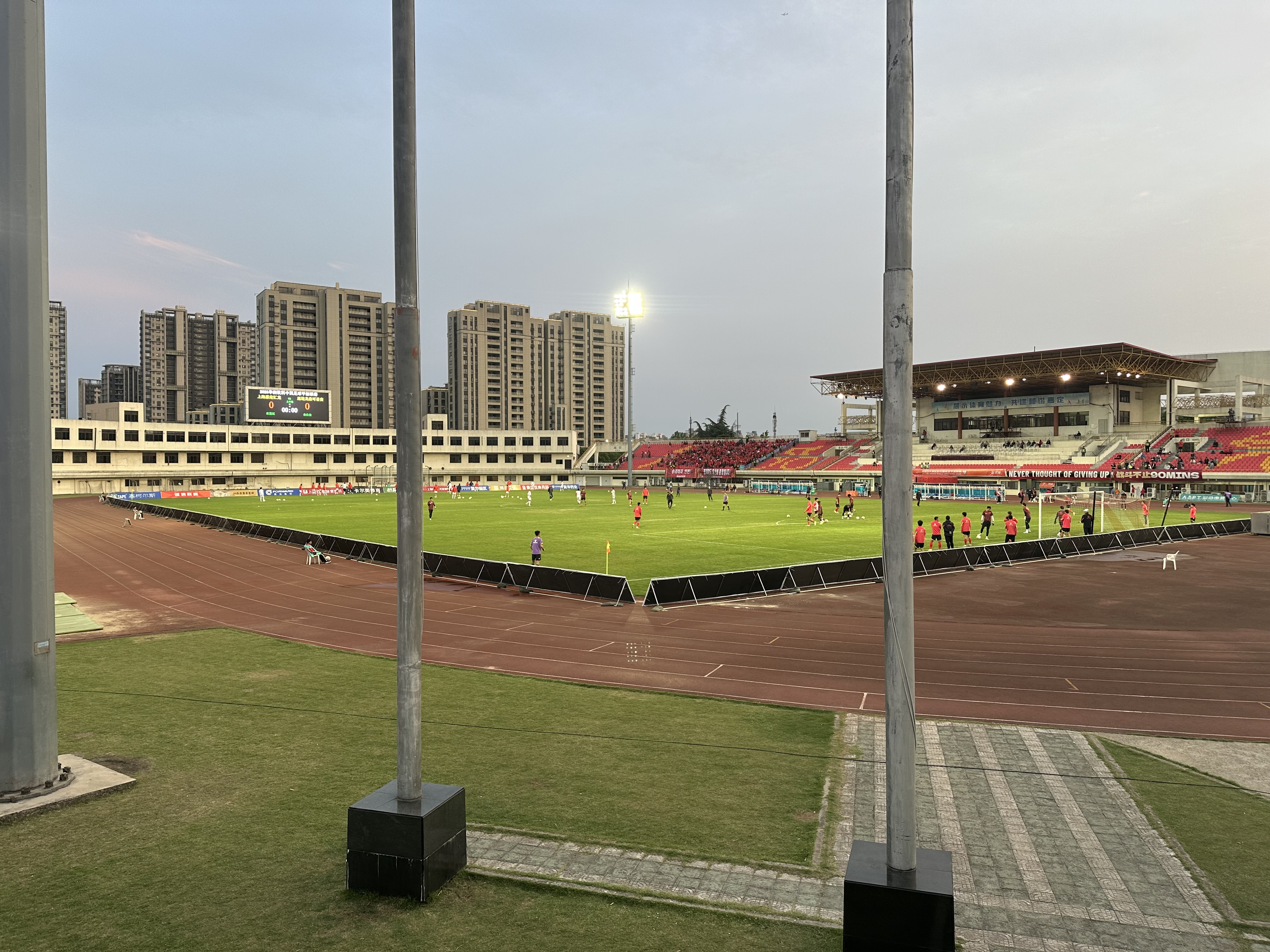
- Location within Shanghai's Jiading District
- Full name: Jiading Stadium
- Former names: Jiading District Stadium (pre-2015 redevelopment)
- Address: No. 118 Xincheng Road, Jiading District; Shanghai; China
- Coordinates: 31.378778°N 121.267729°E
- Owner: Jiading District Sports Bureau
- Operator: Shanghai Jiading Huilong F.C
- Capacity: 9,704 (football matches)
- Surface: Natural grass
- Scoreboard: Yes

Construction
- Opened: 2014 (new stadium)
- Renovated: 2024 (post-typhoon repairs)

Tenants
- Shanghai Jiading Huilong F.C. (2021–present); Shanghai Quanqi Pioneers F.C. (2023–2024)

The Jiading Stadium is a sports venue in Jiading District, Shanghai, China.

== History ==
In March 2022, the stadium was temporarily converted into a centralized quarantine facility for asymptomatic and mild COVID-19 cases during Shanghai's pandemic surge. The renovation was part of a city-wide effort to expand quarantine capacity, alongside another venue in Minhang District:cite.

== Facilities ==
No specific details about the stadium's infrastructure are available in news sources. However, as of 2023, Jiading District reported 211 football fields (including 36 full-size pitches), though it is unclear if this includes Jiading Stadium.
