= Tiago André (footballer, born 1983) =

Portuguese footballer

Personal information
- Full name: Tiago André Carvalho Nogueira
- Date of birth: 20 October 1983 (age 43)
- Place of birth: Fafe, Portugal
- Height: 1.79 m (5 ft 10 in)
- Position: Forward

Team information
- Current team: Fafe
- Number: 29

Youth career
- 2000–2002: Fafe

Senior career*
Years	Team	Apps	(Gls)
2001–2004	Fafe		
2004–2005	Porto B		
2005–2007	Fafe		
2007–2009	Gil Vicente	38	(0)
2010	Espinho		
2010–2011	Bragança		
2011–2012	Tirsense	28	(4)
2012–2013	Fafe	30	(6)
2013	Ribeirão	9	(0)
2014	Freamunde	12	(0)
2014–2015	Tirsense	31	(4)
2015–2017	Amarante	66	(4)
2018	Juventude Pedras Salgadas	19	(3)
2018–	Fafe	57	(3)
- * Club domestic league appearances and goals as of 1 August 2020

Tiago André Carvalho Nogueira (born 20 October 1983), known as Tiago André, is a Portuguese footballer who plays as a forward for AD Fafe.

== Career ==
Tiago André made his professional debut in the Segunda Liga for Gil Vicente on 18 August 2007 in a game against Estoril.
