= Fafe =

- Municipality
- City of Fafe
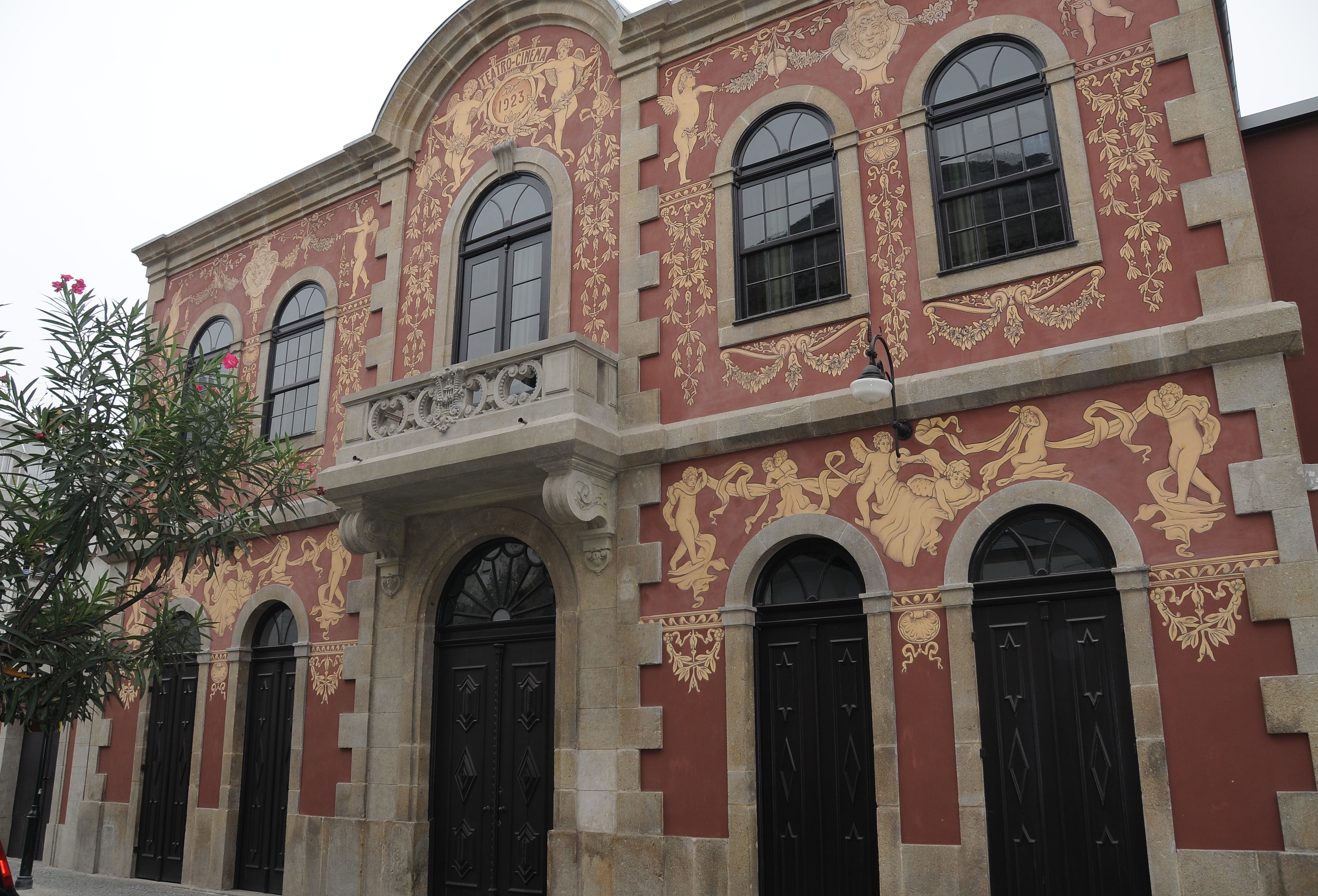
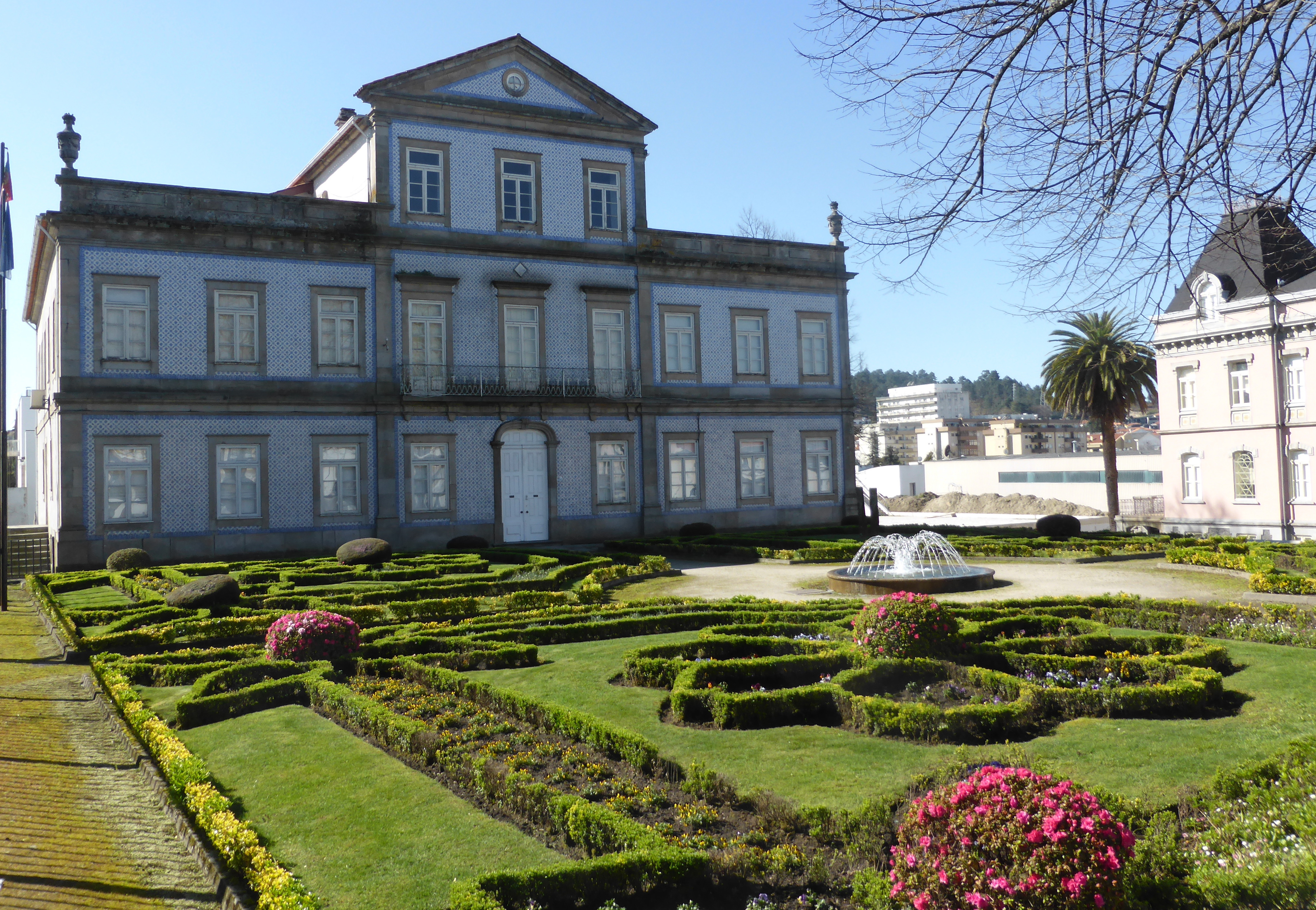
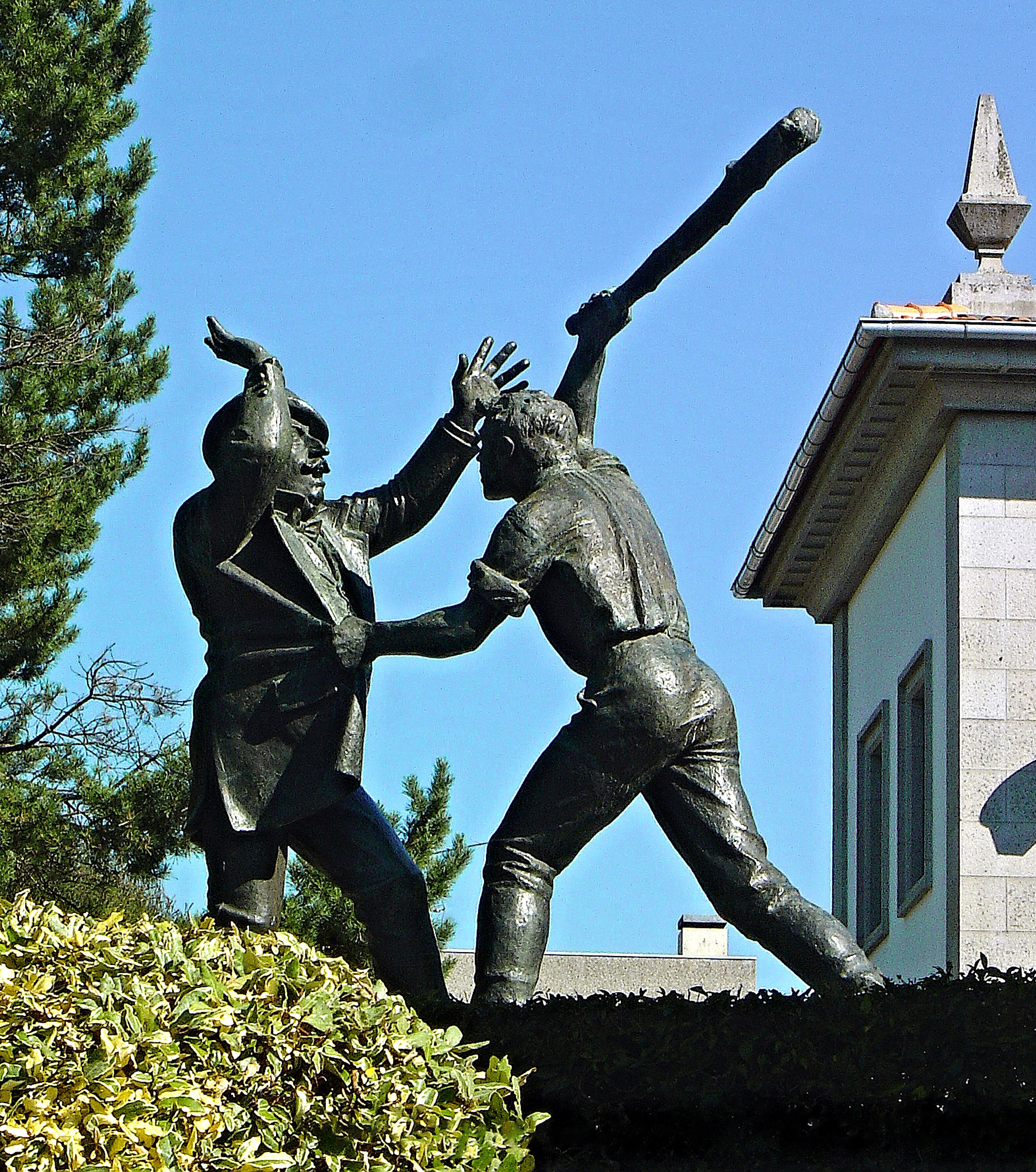
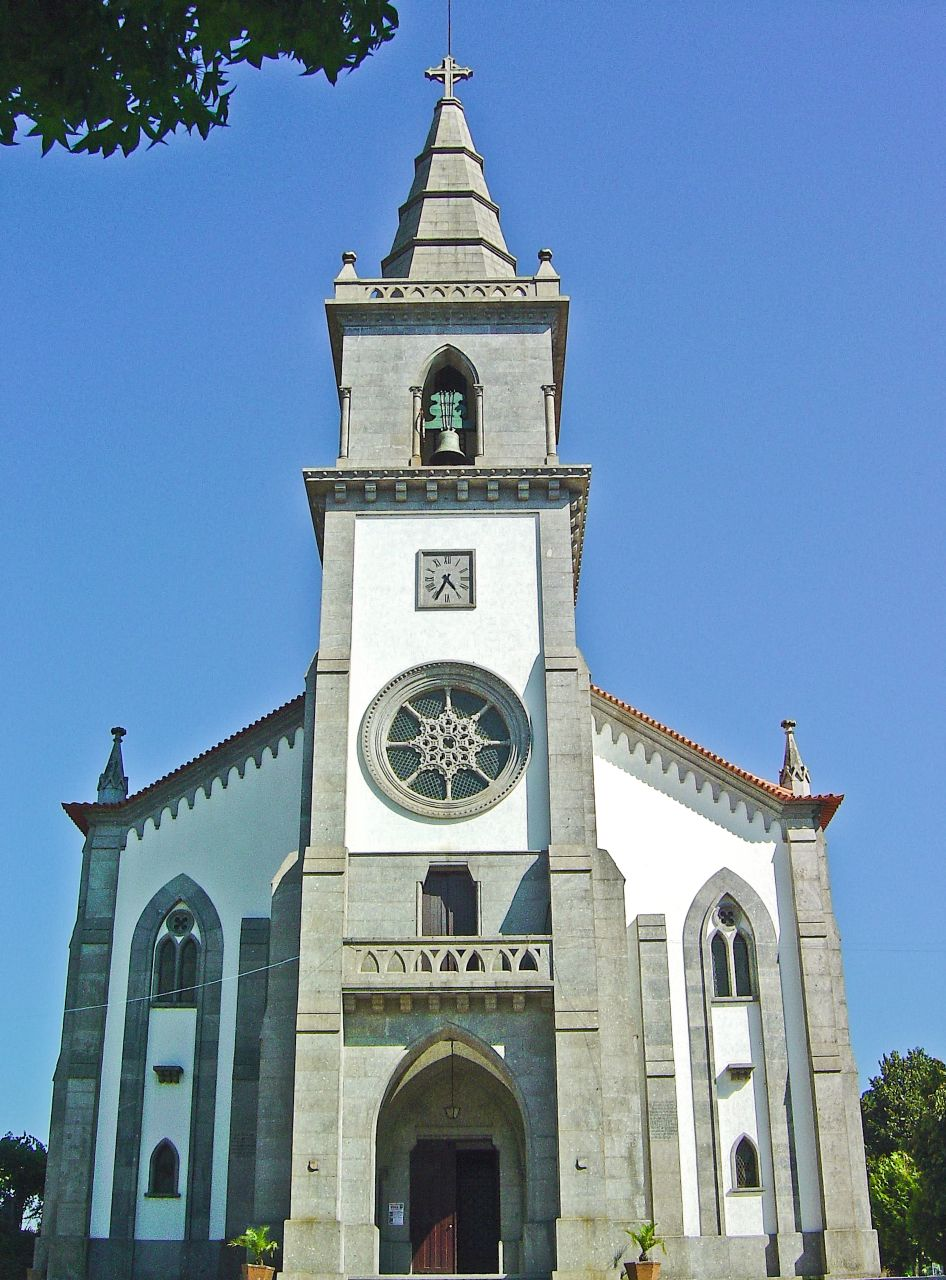
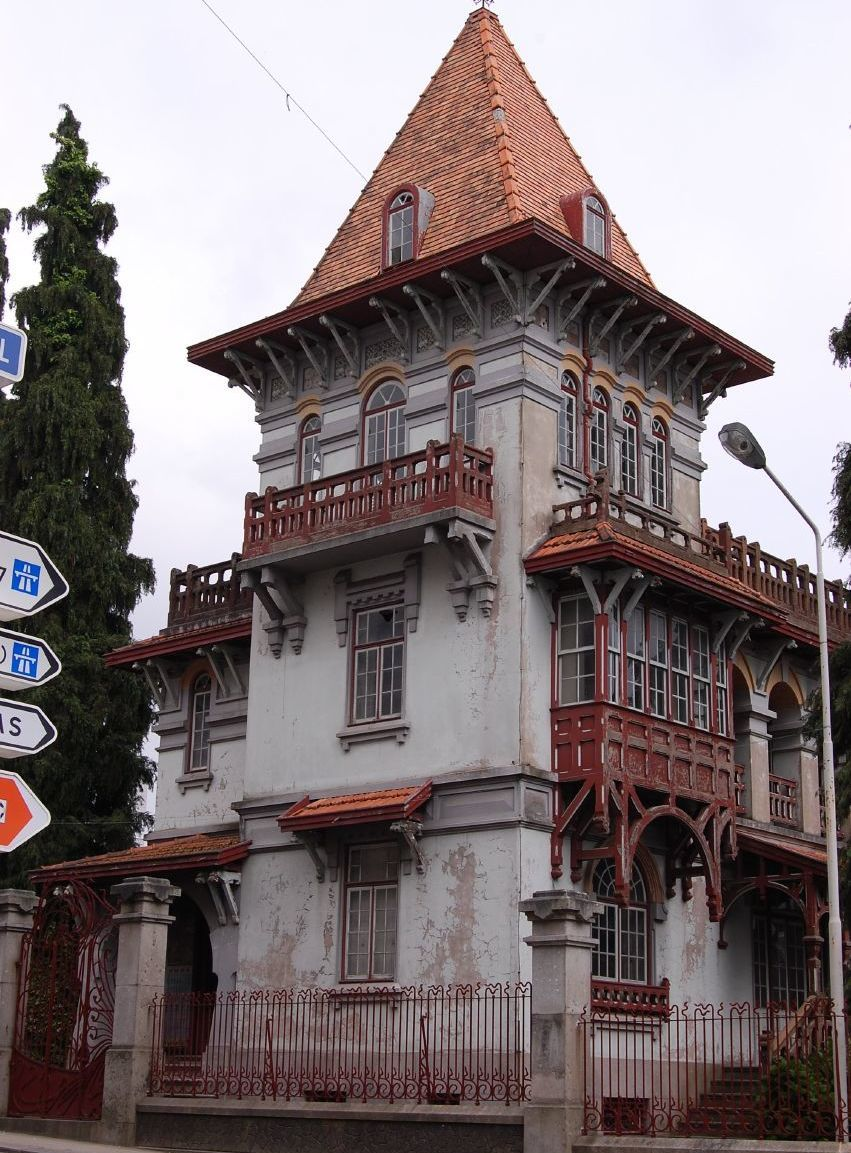
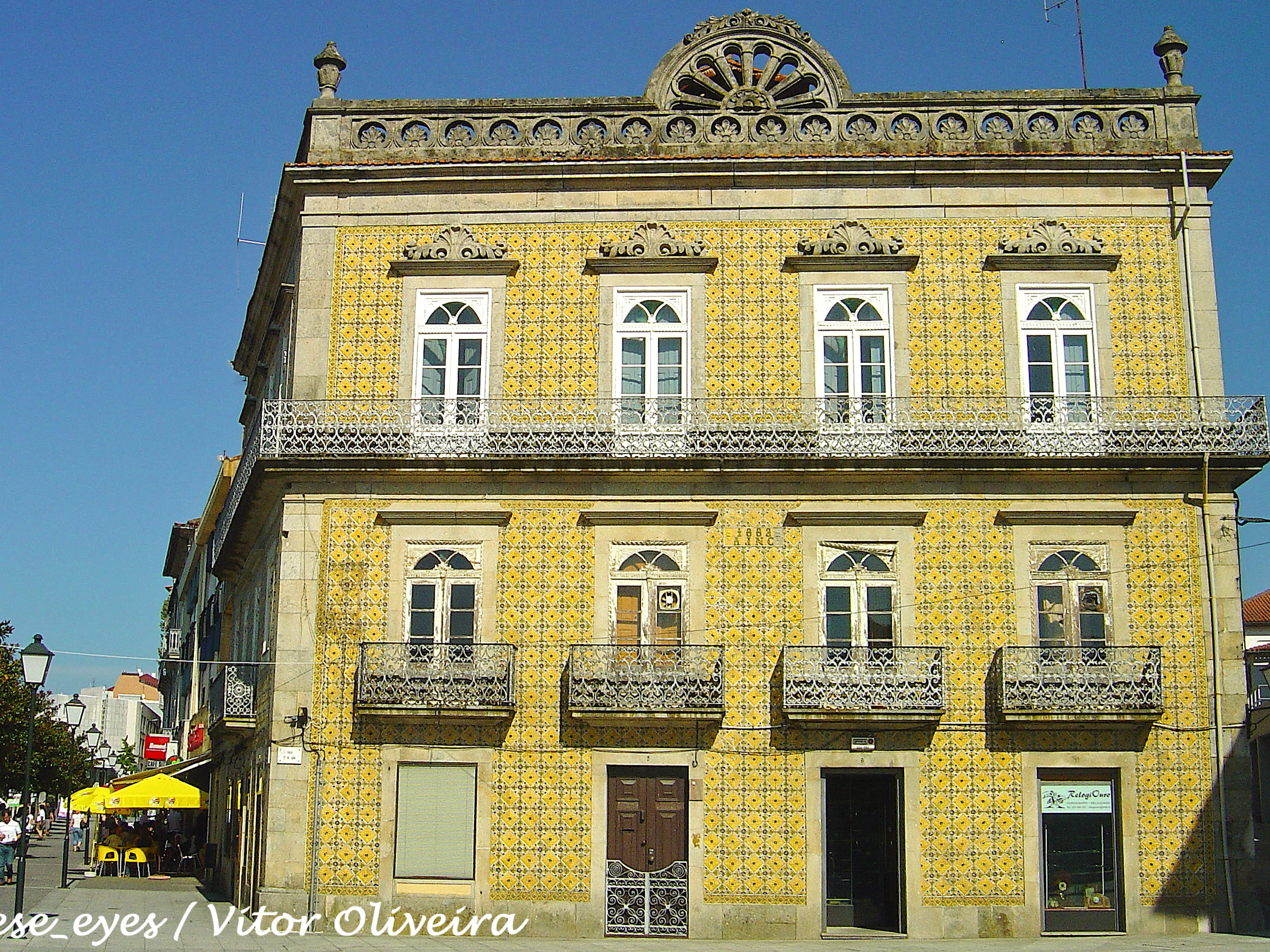
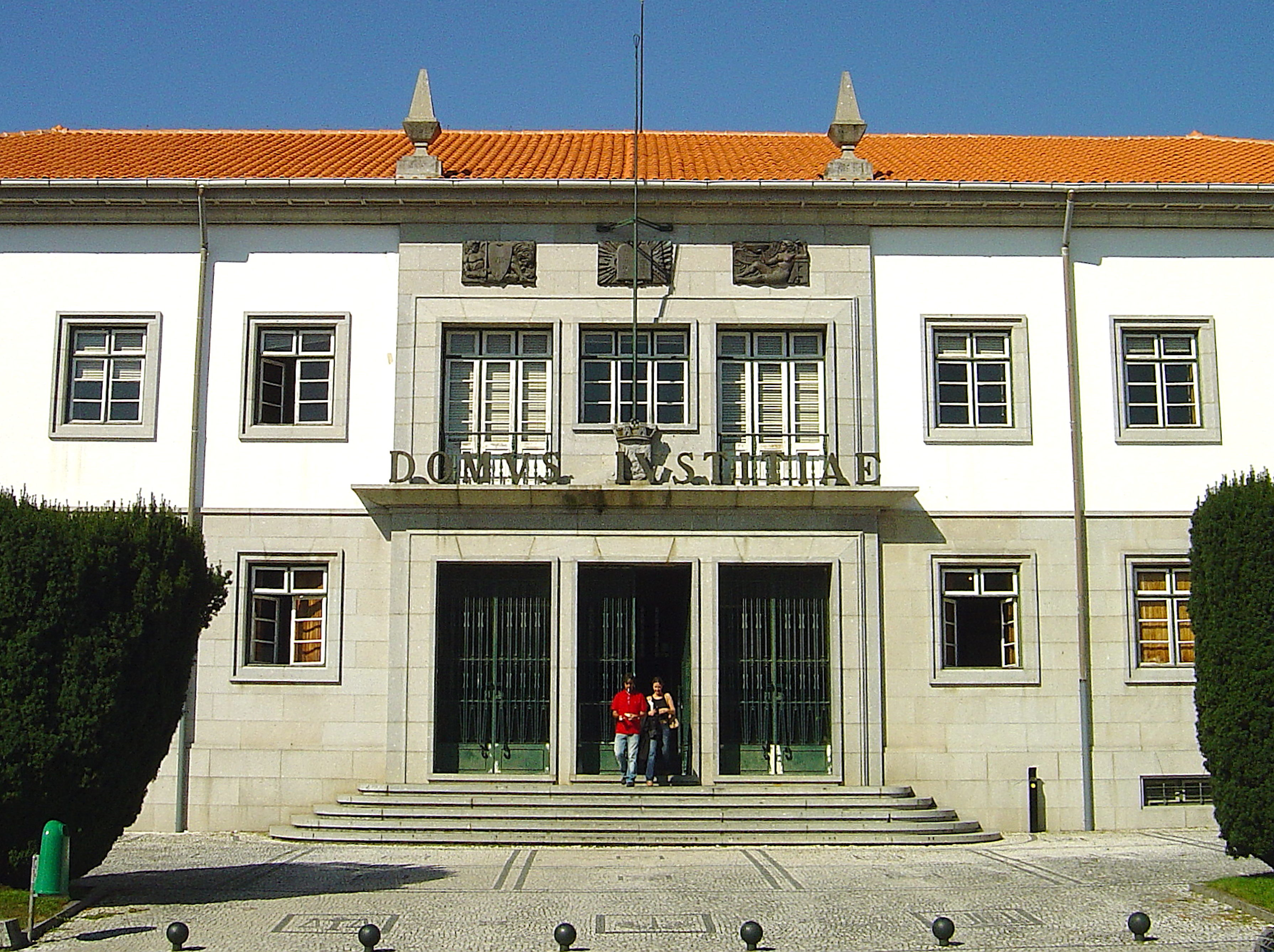

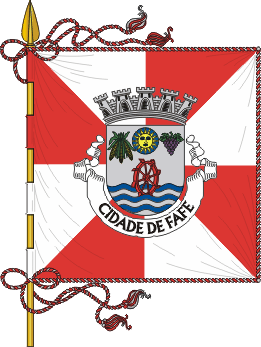
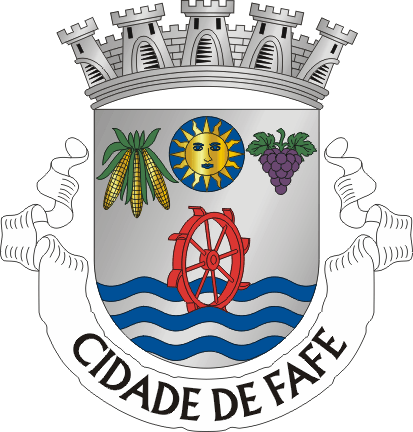
- Flag Coat of arms
- Interactive map of Fafe
- Location in Portugal
- Coordinates: 41°27′N 8°10′W
- Country: Portugal
- Region: Norte
- Intermunic. comm.: Ave
- District: Braga
- Parishes: 25

Government
  - President: Antero Barbosa (PS)

Area
  - Total: 219.08 km^{2} (84.59 sq mi)

Population (2021)
  - Total: 48,502
  - Density: 221.39/km^{2} (573.40/sq mi)
- Time zone: UTC+00:00 (WET)
  - Summer (DST): UTC+01:00 (WEST)
- Website: http://www.cm-fafe.pt

Fafe (Portuguese pronunciation: [ˈfafɨ]), officially the City of Fafe (Portuguese: Cidade de Fafe), is a city and municipality in the northern Portuguese district of Braga. The population in 2021 was 48,502, in an area of approximately 219.08 square kilometres (84.59 mi^{2}). The city itself had a population of 15,703 in 2011. The present mayor is Antero Barbosa, elected by the Socialist Party. The municipal holiday is May 16.

== History ==
The territory of Fafe municipality has been inhabited for at least 3000 years, as evidenced by archaeological findings tied to the Celts and Romans. One of the most important sites is the castro of Santo Ovídio, a hillfort settlement located approximately 1 kilometre (0.62 mi) east of the city center of Fafe.

In the 10th century King Ordoño III of León donated the Vila de Moraria (Moreira de Rei) and Monte Longo to the monastery of Guimarães, founded by the Countess Mumadona.

The territory was effect the Diocese of Braga in the 12th century, and was one of the largest of the seven dioceses, with approximately 950 to 1000 parishes divided into 38 group. During the 1220 Inquirições (Inquiries), the territory of Monte Longo was first identified. This location would have an effect; in 1258, the municipality was designated as the lands and julgado (judicial territory) of Monte Longo.

By 1320, Fafe was part of the Diocese of Braga and the Terra de Entre Ave e Vizela, also known as the Terra de Montelongo, with 15 parishes, among which Santa Ovaia Antiga (Santa Eulália de Fafe).

On 15 November 1514, King D. Manuel I conceded the first foral (charter) to the town of Fafe. The 1527 Numeramento de D. João III (census of King John III), the parish of Samta Ovaya Antigua (Santa Eulália) had only 64 neighbours.

It was only in 1647 that the first reference to the toponymy Fafe, and shortly thereafter (1655) the parish adopted the name Santa Eulália de Fafe.

In 1706, the donatário of the town of Fafe and municipality of Montelongo was the Count of Vimieiro. By mid-century, though, in 1758, the Memórias Paroquiais (Parochial Memories) described that the donation was attributed to the Marquis of Valença, D. Miguel de Portugal e Castro.

Between 1907 and 1986 Fafe was served by the narrow-gauge trains of the Guimarães line. The railway is now closed between Guimarães and Fafe.

== Geography ==
The municipality is situated in a valley.

Administratively, the municipality is divided into 25 civil parishes:

- Aboim, Felgueiras, Gontim e Pedraído
- Agrela e Serafão
- Antime e Silvares (São Clemente)
- Ardegão, Arnozela e Seidões
- Armil
- Cepães e Fareja
- Estorãos
- Fafe
- Fornelos
- Freitas e Vila Cova
- Golães
- Medelo
- Monte e Queimadela
- Moreira do Rei e Várzea Cova
- Paços
- Quinchães
- Regadas
- Revelhe
- Ribeiros
- Santa Cristina de Arões
- São Gens
- São Martinho de Silvares
- São Romão de Arões
- Travassós
- Vinhós

== Architecture ==
=== Civic ===
- Fafe Comarca Jailhouse (Portuguese: Cadeia Comarcã de Fafe/Posto da Guarda Nacional Republicana, GNR, de Fafe)
- Municipal Palace/Hall of Fafe (Portuguese: Câmara Municipal de Fafe/Paços do Concelho de Fafe)
- Casa do Penedo

=== Religious ===
- Chapel of Prata (Portuguese: Capela da Prata)
- Chapel of Nossa Senhora da Ajuda (Portuguese: Capela de Nossa Senhora da Ajuda)
- Chapel of Nossa Senhora da Conceição (Portuguese: Capela de Nossa Senhora da Conceição)
- Chapel of Nossa Senhora do Desterro (Portuguese: Capela de Nossa Senhora do Desterro)
- Chapel of Nossa Senhora das Graças (Portuguese: Capela de Nossa Senhora das Graças)
- Chapel of Nossa Senhora da Guadalupe (Portuguese: Capela de Nossa Senhora de Guadalupe)
- Chapel of Nossa Senhora de Lourdes (Portuguese: Capela de Nossa Senhora de Lourdes)
- Chapel of Nossa Senhora do Socorro (Portuguese: Capela de Nossa Senhora do Socorro)
- Chapel of Santa Bárbara (Portuguese: Capela de Santa Bárbara)
- Chapel of Santa Luzia (Portuguese: Capela de Santa Luzia)
- Chapel of Santa Marinha (Portuguese: Capela de Santa Marinha)
- Chapel of Santa Rita (Portuguese: Capela de Santa Rita)
- Chapel of Santo Amaro (Portuguese: Capela de Santo Amaro)
- Chapel of Santo André (Portuguese: Capela de Santo André)

== Municipal holiday ==
Every year, on May 16th and since the end of the XVIII century, the city celebrates their traditional "Feiras Francas" holding a livestock contest and the horse race at a halt. Nowadays, a more rich and varied program combines reminiscences of the past with contemporary times, with folkloric and popular-rooted musical events, DJs and modern music groups, equestrian schools and car racing events.

== Sports ==
Fafe is home to the AD Fafe football club, which currently plays in the third tier (Liga 3) of Portuguese football. The team plays in Estádio Municipal de Fafe.

The Rally Serras de Fafe e Felgueiras auto race is held since 2010, and is part of the European Rally Championship since 2021.

== Education ==
The Institute of Higher Studies of Fafe (Portuguese: Instituto de Estudos Superios de Fafe) provides tertiary education in Fafe.

== Notable people ==
- Manuel Abreu (1959–2022) a football coach and player
- Tiago André (born 1983) a footballer
- Vanessa Barata (born 1988), a lawyer and politician
- Francisco Castro (born 1979) a former footballer who played as a midfielder
- Vasco Cruz (born 1994) a footballer who plays as a defender
- Sandro Cunha (born 1982) a former professional footballer with 385 club caps
- Diana Durães (born 1996) a swimmer who holds national records in the 200, 400, 800, 1500 and 5000 metres freestyle
- Hélder Ferreira (born 1997) is a footballer who plays as a right winger
- Joaquim Gonçalves (1936–2013) a bishop of the Roman Catholic Diocese of Vila Real from 1991 to 2011
- Armindo Freitas-Magalhães (born 1966) a psychologist working on the psychology of the human smile
- Henrique Nogueira (born 1986) a former professional footballer who played as a central defender
- José Freitas Martins (born 1951) a former racing cyclist
- Clara Marques Mendes (born 1970), a lawyer and politician
- Luís Marques Mendes (born 1957), lawyer and politician, former Leader of the Social Democratic Party
- Bruno Monteiro (born 1984) is a former footballer who played as a defensive midfielder and central defender
- Tomané (born 1992) is a footballer who plays as a forward

== Twin towns – sister cities ==
Fafe is twined with:

- Sens, France (2012)
- Porto Seguro, Brazil (2009)
