= Dingnan County =

Dingnan County 定南县 Tingyuan
- County
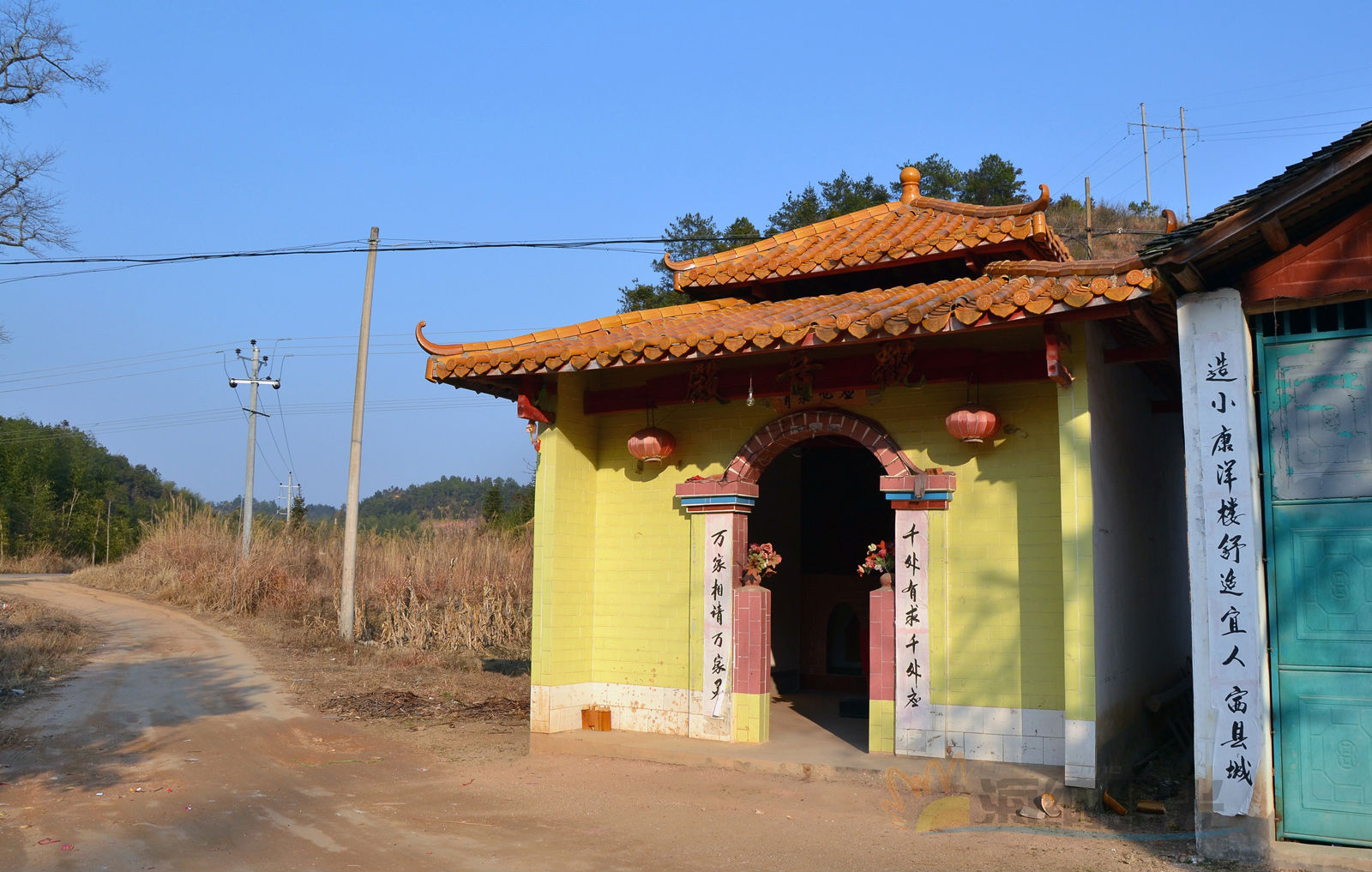

- Location in Jiangxi
- Coordinates: 24°47′04″N 115°01′41″E
- Country: People's Republic of China
- Province: Jiangxi
- Prefecture-level city: Ganzhou

Area
  - County: 1,321 km^{2} (510 sq mi)

Population (2020)
  - County: 209,914
  - Density: 168/km^{2} (440/sq mi)
  - Urban: 132,171
  - Rural: 77,743
- Postal Code: 341900
- Website: www.dingnan.gov.cn

Dingnan (Chinese: 定南; pinyin: Dìngnán) is a county under the jurisdiction of the prefecture-level city of Ganzhou, in the far south of Jiangxi province, China, bordering Guangdong province to the south. As of the 2020 Chinese census, the population of Dingnan was 209,914. It is a center of Hakka culture.

== Administration ==
The county executive, legislature, judiciary are at Lishi Town (历市镇), together with the CPC and PSB branches.

Presently, Dingnan County has 7 towns.

7 towns

- Lishi (历市镇)
- Kuimeishan (岿美山镇)
- Laocheng (老城镇)
- Tianjiu (天九镇)
- Longtang (龙塘镇)
- Lingbei (岭北镇)
- Egong (鹅公镇)

== Climate ==
Climate data for Dingnan, elevation 253 m (830 ft), (1991–2020 normals, extremes 1981–2010)
Month	Jan	Feb	Mar	Apr	May	Jun	Jul	Aug	Sep	Oct	Nov	Dec	Year
Record high °C (°F)	27.2 (81.0)	30.3 (86.5)	31.6 (88.9)	33.1 (91.6)	35.3 (95.5)	37.0 (98.6)	39.3 (102.7)	38.1 (100.6)	36.9 (98.4)	34.7 (94.5)	33.6 (92.5)	27.9 (82.2)	39.3 (102.7)
Mean daily maximum °C (°F)	14.5 (58.1)	16.9 (62.4)	19.7 (67.5)	24.8 (76.6)	28.5 (83.3)	31.0 (87.8)	34.1 (93.4)	33.2 (91.8)	30.4 (86.7)	26.7 (80.1)	22.0 (71.6)	16.6 (61.9)	24.9 (76.8)
Daily mean °C (°F)	9.2 (48.6)	11.5 (52.7)	14.8 (58.6)	20.0 (68.0)	23.7 (74.7)	26.2 (79.2)	27.8 (82.0)	27.2 (81.0)	25.2 (77.4)	21.3 (70.3)	16.3 (61.3)	10.9 (51.6)	19.5 (67.1)
Mean daily minimum °C (°F)	6.0 (42.8)	8.2 (46.8)	11.6 (52.9)	16.6 (61.9)	20.5 (68.9)	23.1 (73.6)	23.5 (74.3)	23.3 (73.9)	21.8 (71.2)	17.5 (63.5)	12.5 (54.5)	7.3 (45.1)	16.0 (60.8)
Record low °C (°F)	−4.1 (24.6)	−1.7 (28.9)	−2.3 (27.9)	5.2 (41.4)	10.7 (51.3)	14.2 (57.6)	18.2 (64.8)	18.7 (65.7)	11.9 (53.4)	6.2 (43.2)	−1.4 (29.5)	−4.6 (23.7)	−4.6 (23.7)
Average precipitation mm (inches)	66.4 (2.61)	82.5 (3.25)	155.3 (6.11)	192.8 (7.59)	233.1 (9.18)	275.6 (10.85)	160.8 (6.33)	199.3 (7.85)	101.7 (4.00)	39.0 (1.54)	46.3 (1.82)	47.1 (1.85)	1,599.9 (62.98)
Average precipitation days (≥ 0.1 mm)	9.1	11.3	16.7	16.2	17.5	18.6	15.2	15.7	10.8	5.2	6.8	7.0	150.1
Average snowy days	0.4	0.3	0	0	0	0	0	0	0	0	0	0.2	0.9
Average relative humidity (%)	76	79	82	82	82	84	79	81	79	73	74	72	79
Mean monthly sunshine hours	100.5	85.0	76.8	86.4	108.3	125.0	195.1	178.1	161.9	164.1	145.3	134.9	1,561.4
Percentage possible sunshine	30	26	21	23	26	31	47	45	44	46	45	41	35
Source: China Meteorological Administration
