= Xuan Zhijian =

Chinese footballer (born 2005)

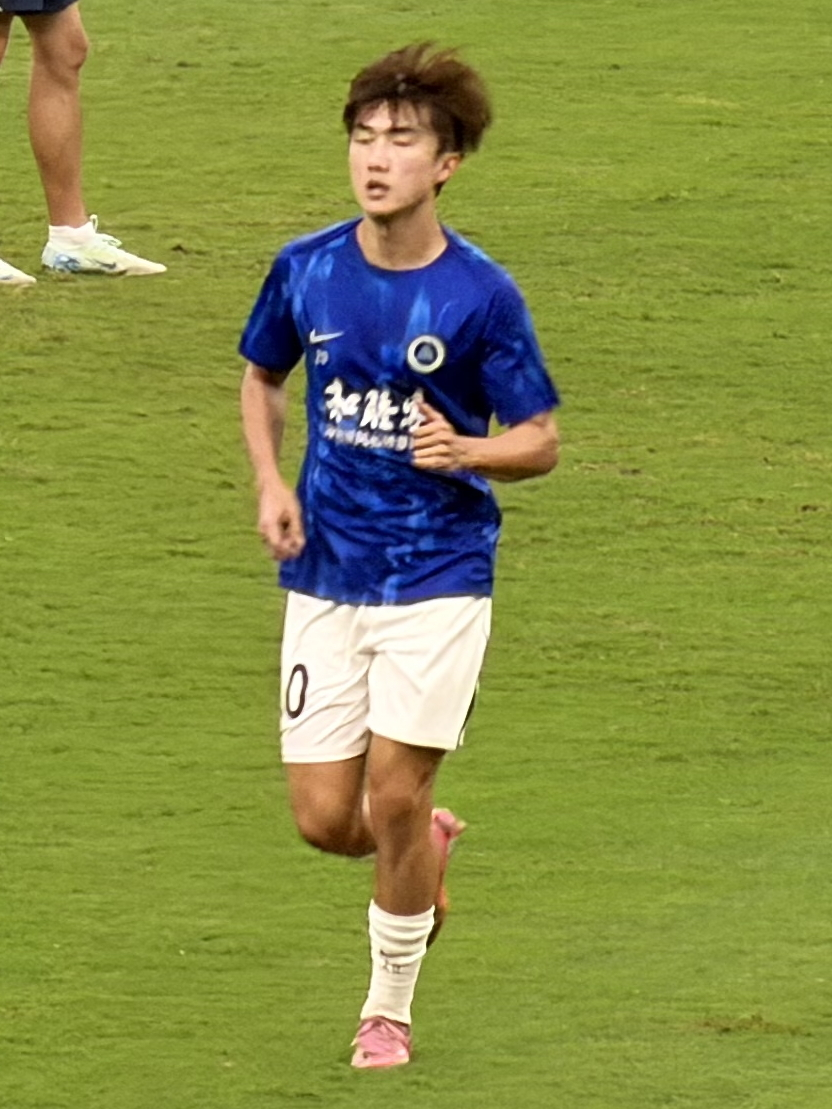
- Xuan in April 2026

Personal information
- Full name: Xuan Zhijian
- Date of birth: 28 October 2005 (age 21)
- Place of birth: Yanji, Jilin, China
- Height: 1.81 m (5 ft 11 in)
- Positions: Right-back; left-back

Team information
- Current team: Shenzhen Peng City
- Number: 20

Youth career
- Yanbian Future
- –2024: Changchun Yatai

Senior career*
Years	Team	Apps	(Gls)
2024–2025	Changchun Yatai	21	(0)
2024	→ Yanbian Longding (loan)	23	(1)
2026–	Shenzhen Peng City	24	(0)

International career^{‡}
2025–	China U22	2	(0)
- * Club domestic league appearances and goals as of 22 November 2026 ‡ National team caps and goals as of 22 November 2025

Xuan Zhijian (Chinese: 玄智健; pinyin: Xuán Zhìjiàn; Korean: 현지건; born 28 October 2005) is a Chinese professional footballer who plays as a right-back for Chinese Super League club Shenzhen Peng City.

== Club career ==
=== Changchun Yatai ===
Born in Yanji in the Yanbian Korean Autonomous Prefecture in the province of Jilin, Xuan Zhijian played football at the Yanbian Future Football Youth Training Center during primary school. He then joined the youth academy of Changchun Yatai. In 2021, he participated in the 2021 National Games of China for the province of Jilin.

In 2024, Xuan went on loan to China League One club Yanbian Longding, and wore the number 2 shirt. On 23 March 2024, he made his professional and senior debut in a 1–0 away league win over Nanjing City, coming on as a 65th minute substitute for Han Guanghui. On 15 May 2024, he provided an assist for Li Long in a 1–1 away draw and eventual penalty shoot-out loss to Chinese Champions League side Shanghai Mitsubishi Industries Flying Lion. On 8 September 2024, Xuan scored his first goal for Yanbian Longding in the 35th minute of a home 2–2 draw with Yalian Yingbo. In total, he made 24 appearances for the club in all competitions.

Upon his return to Changchun Yatai in 2025, he was given the number 20 for the 2025 Chinese Super League season. On 28 February 2025, he made his Chinese Super League debut with Changchun Yatai in a 2–0 away loss to defending league champions Shanghai Port. On 15 April 2025, he provided an assist for Tan Long's 20th-minute equaliser in a 3–1 away loss to Shenzhen Peng City. With this assist, he became the second youngest assist provider for Changchun Yatai in the Chinese Super League at 19 years 169 days since 2012, only behind He Yiran in December 2022. Changchun Yatai were relegated to China League One at the end of the season.

=== Shenzhen Peng City ===
On 2 February 2026, Changchun Yatai announced Xuan's departure from the club to join Chinese Super League side Shenzhen Peng City.

== International career ==
In April 2021, he was selected by the Chinese Football Association to take part in a training camp for players at the 2005 and 2006 age levels.

In May, July, and August 2025, he was called up for three different China U22 training camps.

== Career statistics ==
=== Club ===
As of 22 November 2025

Appearances and goals by club, season, and competition
Club	Season	League			Cup		Continental		Other		Total	
Club	Season	Division	Apps	Goals	Apps	Goals	Apps	Goals	Apps	Goals	Apps	Goals
Yanbian Longding (loan)	2024	China League One	23	1	1	0	–		–		24	1
Changchun Yatai	2025	Chinese Super League	21	0	1	0	–		–		22	0
Career total			44	1	2	0	0	0	0	0	46	1
