= Swimming at the 2025 National Games of China =

- Venue: Shenzhen Universiade Sports Centre Natatorium
- Dates: 10–17 November 2025

Swimming was part of the 2025 National Games of China held in Guangdong, Hong Kong and Macau, and was contested from November 10 to 17. The swimming events had a total of 41 gold medals.

In these Games, veterans Wang Shun and Xu Jiayu won their fourth consecutive National Games gold medal in two events each - Wang for the 200m and 400m individual medley events and Xu for the 100m and 200m backstroke events. Notably, Wang Shun's total count of 19 National Games gold medals also made him the first athlete in history to achieve this record.

Teenagers Yu Zidi and Zhang Zhanshuo also shone in these Games. 13-year-old Yu broke the Asian Record in the women's 200m individual medley event and 18-year-old Zhang broke his own World Junior Record in the men's 400m freestyle event.

== Medal summary ==
=== Men ===
Event	Gold		Silver		Bronze	
50m freestyle	Ian Ho（Hong Kong）	21.71	Chen Hao （Liaoning）	22.17	Liu Wudi（Fujian）	22.21
100m freestyle	Pan Zhanle（Zhejiang）	48.01	Liu Wudi（Fujian）	48.25	Wang Haoyu（Henan）	48.49
100m freestyle	Pan Zhanle（Zhejiang）	48.01	Liu Wudi（Fujian）	48.25	Zhao Jiayue（Jiangsu）	48.49
200m freestyle	Zhang Zhanshuo（Shandong）	1:44.86	Ji Xinjie（Chinese Police Sports Association）	1:45.96	Pan Zhanle（Zhejiang）	1:46.37
400m freestyle	Zhang Zhanshuo（Shandong）	3:42.82	Xu Haibo（Hubei）	3:47.73	Fei Liwei（Zhejiang）	3:47.91
800m freestyle	Zhang Zhanshuo (Shandong）	7:46.69	Fei Liwei（Zhejiang）	7:51.42	Liu Peixin（Shandong）	7:53.00
1500m freestyle	Zhang Zhanshuo（Shandong）	14:52.73	Fei Liwei（Zhejiang）	14:56.08	Li Chengyu Shanxi）	15:03.50
50m backstroke	Xu Jiayu（Zhejiang）	24.40（NR）	Wang Zicheng (Hubei）	24.80	Jiang Chenglin（Shanxi	25.01
100m backstroke	Xu Jiayu（Zhejiang）	52.39	Wang Gukailai（Heilongjiang）	53.88	Jiang Chenglin（Shanxi）	53.99
200m backstroke	Xu Jiayu（Zhejiang）	1:56.63	Tao Guannan（Guangdong）	1:58.79	Wang Yutian（Hubei）	1:59.38
50m breaststroke	Zheng Yinghao（Shanghai）	26.97	Yan Zibei（Hubei）	27.04	Sun Jiajun（Hubei）	27.23
100m breaststroke	Qin Haiyang（Shanghai）	58.98	Zheng Yinghao（Shanghai）	59.47	Yan Zibei（Hubei）	59.49
200m breaststroke	Qin Haiyang（Shanghai）	2:07.69	Dong Zhihao（Jiangsu）	2:08.99	Mai Shiting（Hong Kong）	2:09.93
50m butterfly stroke	Wang Changhao（Tianjin）	23.30	Xu Fang（Shandong）	23.45	Shen Jiahao (Zhejiang）	23.58
100m butterfly stroke	Wang Changhao（Tianjin）	51.40	Xu Fang（Shandong）	51.46	Chen Juner（Guangdong）	52.32
200m butterfly stroke	Xu Fang（Shandong）	1:54.74	Wang Yizhe （Shandong）	1:56.07	Chen Juner（Guangdong）	1:56.83
200m individual medley	Wang Shun（Zhejiang）	1:56.20	Tao Guannan（Guangdong）	1:59.86	Chen Nuo（Shanghai）	2:00.34
400m individual medley	Wang Shun（Zhejiang）	4:14.90	Huang Zhiwei Hunan）	4:16.06	He Yubo（Hebei）	4:18.36
4 × 100 m freestyle relay	Zhejiang; He Junyi; Wang Shun; Shen Jiahao; Pan Zhanle; Wu Shengkai; Sun Yang; Hong Jinquan; Xie Yichen	3:15.01	Henan; Zhuang Jiayqi; Ji Yichun; Yu Jinming; Wang Haoyu	3:15.47	Chinese Police Sports Association; Ji Xinjie; Liu Shaofeng; Wang Yi; Xu Haonan	3:16.14
4 × 200 m freestyle relay	Shandong; Zhang Zhanshuo; Zhao Yipu; Liu Peixin; Li Yifeng; Liu Yaojie; Chen Mengxiang	7:05.36	Zhejiang; Fei Liwei; Sun Yang; Pan Zhanle; Wang Shun; Xu Yizhou; Zhao Liangzhou; Hong Jinquan; Xie Yichen	7:06.74	Chinese Police Sports Association; Ji Xinjie; Liu Shaoeng; Wang Yi; Xu Haonan	7:15.95
4 × 100 m medley relay	Hubei; Yan Zibei; Wang Zicheng; Sun Jiajun; Xu Haibo; Luo Mingpei; Huang Zichun; Zhang Ziyang	3:34.39	Guangdong; Chen Juner; Qiu Tian; Li Taiyu; Lin Tao; Luo Junwu; Tao Guannan	3:36.02	Jiangsu; Dong Zhihao; Xu Guoqin; Zhao Jiayue; Yu Yang; Zhu Lifan	3:36.78

=== Women ===
Event	Gold		Silver		Bronze	
50m freestyle	Wu Qingfeng（Zhejiang）	24.21	Cheng Yujie（Jiangxi）	24.23	Siobhán Haughey（Hong Kong）	24.84
50m freestyle	Wu Qingfeng（Zhejiang）	24.21	Cheng Yujie（Jiangxi）	24.23	Lu Yue（Zhejiang）	24.84
100m freestyle	Siobhán Haughey（Hong Kong）	52.89	Yang Junxuan（Shandong）	53.55	Cheng Yujie（Jiangxi）	53.65
200m freestyle	Siobhán Haughey（Hong Kong）	1:54.85	Li Bingjie（Hebei）	1:55.67	Liu Yaxin（Zhejiang）	1:56.01
400m freestyle	Li Bingjie（Hebei）	4:01.17	Yang Peiqi（Hubei）	4:01.90	Liu Yaxin (Zhejiang）	4:03.20
800m freestyle	Li Bingjie（Hebei）	8:19.00	Mao Yihan Zhejiang）	8:27.34	Gao Weizhong Hebei）	8:29.94
1500m freestyle	Li Bingjie（Hebei）	15:55.40	Wu Ruoxin（Henan）	16:00.61	Mao Yihan（Zhejiang）	16:04.92
50m backstroke	Wan Letian（Jiangxi）	27.38	Wang Xue'er（Guangdong）	27.50	Chen Jie Hubei）	27.76
100m backstroke	Peng Xuwei（Hubei）	59.60	Lu Xinchen（Zhejiang）	59.96	Wang Xue'er（Guangdong）	59.99
200m backstroke	Peng Xuwei (Hubei）	2:07.74	Liu Yaxin (Zhejiang）	2:08.50	Yang Ruoxi (Tianjin）	2:08.78
50m breaststroke	Tang Qianting（Shanghai）	30.00	Yang Chang（Shanxi）	30.11	Siobhán Haughey（Hong Kong）	30.71
100m breaststroke	Tang Qianting（Shanghai）	1:05.36	Yang Chang（Shanxi）	1:06.06	Song Zixin（Shanghai）	1:07.83
200m breaststroke	Lu Xinyao（Jiangsu）	2:23.63	Tang Qianting (Shanghai）	2:24.60	Zhu Leiji (Yunnan）	2:25.03
50m butterfly stroke	Zhang Yufei（Jiangsu）	25.61	Wu Qingfeng（Zhejiang）	25.72	Yu Yiting（Zhejiang）	25.79
100m butterfly stroke	Zhang Yufei（Jiangsu）	56.88	Wang Yichun（Shandong）	57.60	Wang Jingzhuo（Liaoning）	57.94
200m butterfly stroke	Chen Luying（Fujian）	2:05.45	Yu Zidi（Hebei）	2:06.57	Zhang Yufei（Jiangsu）	2:07.90
200m individual medley	Yu Zidi（Hebei）	2:07.41（AR）	Yu Yiting（Zhejiang）	2:08.30	Chang Mohan (Henan）	2:11.51
400m individual medley	Yu Zidi（Hebei）	4:34.33	Zhang Mohan (Henan）	4:34.59	Ke Wenxi（Hubei）	4:36.00
4 × 100 m freestyle relay	Shandong; Yang Junxuan; Zhang Xinyu; Ge Chutong; Wang Yichun; Li Xinzhe; Li Xinyi	3:36.51	Zhejiang; Yu Yiting; Zhu Menghui; Wu Qingfeng; Liu Yaxin; Yan Zhaoshan; Lu Yue; Kong Yaqi; Fan Yaqi	3:36.61	Hebei; Liu Zixuan; Li Bingjie; Yu Zidi; Ma Yonghui; Zhao Jinglei; Zhang Ke	3:38.90
4 × 200 m freestyle relay	Hebei; Li Bingjie; Ma Yonghui; Yu Zidi; Liu Zixuan; Zhang Ke; Zhang Jingyan	7:45.98	Zhejiang; Yu Yiting; Fan Yaqi; Kong Yaqi; Liu Yaxin; Yan Zhaoshan; Mao Yihan; Wu Qingfeng; Lu Yue	7:46.71	Guangdong; Li Jiaping; Tang Muhan; Lao Lihui; Jiang Fengqi; Li Jielan; Yu Liyan	7:53.08
4 × 100 m medley relay	Zhejiang; Yu Yiting; Lu Xincheng; Ye Shiwen; Wu Qingfeng; Qian Xinan; Lin Kechen; Zhou Xinyang; Liu Yaxin	3:57.97	Shanghai; Cai Muke; Li Jiawei; Tang Qianting; Wang Zengyue; Song Zixin	4:00.65	Jiangsu; Liu Yichen; Lu Xinyao; Yang Wenwen; Zhang Yufei; Gao Yaoyao	4:01.24

=== Mixed ===
Event	Gold		Silver		Bronze	
4 × 100 m medley relay	Zhejiang; Yu Yiting; Xu Jiayu; Xie Yichen; Wu Qingfeng; Lu Xinchen; Wang Shun; Zhou Xinyang; Pan Zhanle	3:42.09	Jiangsu; Dong Zhihao; Zhang Yufei; Yang Wenwen; Liu Yichen; Zhao Jiayue; Ding Yuyang	3:44.92	Hubei; Yan Zibei; Peng Xuwei; Sun Jiajun; Ai Yahan; Wang Zicheng; Yu Zongda; Jiang Yuyao; Yang Peiqi	3:45.57
