= Shenzhen Peng City F.C. =

Association football club in China

Shenzhen Peng City Shēnzhèn Xīn Péngchéng 深圳新鹏城
- Full name: Shenzhen Peng City Football Club 深圳新鹏城足球俱乐部
- Founded: 5 January 2017; 9 years ago
- Ground: Shenzhen Sports Center Stadium
- Capacity: 45,000
- Owners: Jianteng Fund (53%); City Football Group (47%)
- Chairman: Tang Xigang
- Head coach: Robbie Neilson
- League: Chinese Super League
- 2025: Chinese Super League, 12th of 16
| Home colours | Away colours |

Shenzhen Peng City Football Club (Note: simplified Chinese: 深圳新鹏城足球俱乐部; traditional Chinese: 深圳新鵬城足球俱樂部; pinyin: Shēnzhèn Xīn Péngchéng Zúqiú Jùlèbù; lit. 'Shenzhen New Peng City F.C.') is a Chinese professional football club based in Shenzhen, Guangdong. The club competes in the Chinese Super League, the top tier of Chinese football. Shenzhen Peng City plays its home matches at the Shenzhen Sports Center Stadium, located within Futian District. They are partially owned by the City Football Group.

Founded as Sichuan Jiuniu Football Club (Note: Chinese: 四川九牛) in 2017, the club relocated to Shenzhen, Guangdong from Chengdu, Sichuan in January 2024, when it rebranded to their current name.

Clubs owned by CFG Listed in order of acquisition/foundation. Bold indicates the club was founded by CFG. * indicates the club was acquired by CFG. § indicates the club is co-owned. † indicates the club is no longer owned by CFG.
| 2008 | (England) Manchester City* |
2009–2012
| 2013 | (United States) **New York City FC**^{§} |
| 2014 | (Australia) Melbourne City* |
| 2014 | (Japan) Yokohama F. Marinos*^{†} |
2015–2016
| 2017 | (Uruguay) Montevideo City* |
| 2017 | (Spain) Girona*^{§} |
2018
| 2019 | (China) Shenzhen Peng City*^{§} |
| 2019 | (India) Mumbai City^{†} |
| 2020 | (Belgium) Lommel* |
| 2020 | (France) Troyes* |
2021
| 2022 | (Italy) Palermo*^{§} |
| 2023 | (Brazil) Bahia*^{§} |

== History ==
The club was founded on 5 January 2017 as Sichuan Jiuniu. They participated in the 2017 China Amateur Football League the same year and managed to advance to the national play-offs, but was eliminated by Zhaoqing Hengtai in the first round. They were ranked 10th and later admitted into China League Two due to the withdrawal of several other teams.

On 20 February 2019, it was announced that the City Football Group, a subsidiary of Abu Dhabi United Group, as well as UBTECH and China Sports Capital, had acquired the club.

On 23 May 2020, the Chinese Football Association announced that eleven professional clubs across China's top three divisions would have their registration cancelled over a failure to pay player wages. As a result, the CFA announced a reclassification of the teams which would contest their professional divisions. According to this reclassification, Sichuan Jiuniu was promoted to China League One for the 2020 season, which was delayed because of the COVID-19 pandemic. In 2022, Sichuan Jiuniu expressed its interest to relocate to Changsha, Hunan, to the Chinese Football Association, but fell short in their attempt as the request was denied by the Chinese FA by April 2023. The Sichuan Jiuniu board, which includes the CFG, further expressed in a statement that, "if the Chinese FA are unable to fulfill their legal relocation request, then the board do not see a sustainable future in investing in Chinese football, and may pull out of the Chinese professional football league system, putting aside all previous investments and hard work."

On 18 October 2023, in their fourth consecutive season in China League One, following a 4–0 home win over Wuxi Wugo, Sichuan Jiuniu secured promotion to the Chinese Super League for the first time in the club's history. A week later on 22 October, Sichuan Jiuniu won the China League One title after second-placed Qingdao West Coast drew their match against Shijiazhuang Gongfu.

On 24 January 2024, the Chinese Football Association confirmed the club's relocation to Shenzhen, Guangdong. The club completed its rebrand to Shenzhen Peng City ahead of their debut Chinese Super League campaign.

== Stadiums ==
In Sichuan Jiuniu's existence, the club have used a multiple of stadiums in their climb up the divisions. The grounds they used between 2017 and 2022 were the South Lake Sports Center and the Chengdu Longquanyi Football Stadium, and in the 2023 season, Sichuan Jiuniu played its home matches at the Shuangliu Sports Centre, the Chengdong Sports Park Stadium, and the Suining Sports Center. In 2024, in the club's first season after its relocation to Shenzhen, they played its home matches at the Bao'an Stadium. Starting from the 2025 season, Shenzhen Peng City moved its home ground to the Shenzhen Sports Center Stadium. They also played two home matches at the Zhaoqing New District Sports Center Stadium in 2025.

== Crest history ==
Sichuan Jiuniu logo used between 2017 and 2023

== Players ==
=== Current squad ===
As of July 2026

Note: Flags indicate national team as defined under FIFA eligibility rules; some limited exceptions apply. Players may hold more than one non-FIFA nationality.

| No. | Pos. | Nation | Player |
|---|---|---|---|
| 1 | GK | CHN | Ji Jiabao |
| 2 | DF | CHN | Tian Yifan |
| 3 | DF | BRA | Gabriel Xavier (on loan from Bahia) |
| 4 | DF | CHN | Jiang Zhipeng |
| 6 | MF | CHN | Yao Junsheng |
| 7 | FW | BRA | Wesley Moraes |
| 8 | MF | TPE | Tim Chow |
| 10 | MF | CHN | Dai Wai Tsun |
| 11 | MF | ALB | Albion Ademi |
| 13 | GK | CHN | Peng Peng |
| 14 | FW | CHN | Li Long |
| 15 | DF | CHN | Yu Rui |
| 16 | DF | CHN | Tang Miao |
| 17 | MF | CHN | Li Ning |

| No. | Pos. | Nation | Player |
|---|---|---|---|
| 19 | MF | CHN | Zhang Yufeng (on loan from Yunnan Yukun) |
| 20 | DF | CHN | Xuan Zhijian |
| 23 | DF | CHN | Yang Yiming |
| 25 | DF | CHN | Zhao Jianfei (on loan from Shandong Taishan) |
| 29 | FW | CHN | Xia Dalong |
| 31 | FW | NED | Deabeas Owusu-Sekyere |
| 35 | GK | CHN | Wei Minzhe (on loan from Wuhan Three Towns) |
| 36 | MF | ISR | Eden Kartsev |
| 39 | MF | CHN | Yu Menghui |
| 46 | DF | CHN | Shen Huanming |
| 49 | GK | CHN | Zhang Haonan |
| 54 | FW | CHN | Yao Junyi |
| 56 | DF | CHN | Wang Yuheng |

=== Out on loan ===
Source: Note: Flags indicate national team as defined under FIFA eligibility rules; some limited exceptions apply. Players may hold more than one non-FIFA nationality.

| No. | Pos. | Nation | Player |
|---|---|---|---|
| — | GK | CHN | Ge Yifan (at Foshan Nanshi until 31 December 2026) |
| — | DF | CHN | Yuan Junjie (at Suzhou Dongwu until 31 December 2026) |
| — | FW | CHN | He Shaolin (at Shanghai Second until 31 December 2026) |
| — | MF | CHN | Jiang Weiyi (at Lanzhou Longyuan Athletic until 31 December 2026) |
| — | FW | CHN | Shahsat Hujahmat (at Shaanxi Union until 31 December 2026) |

| No. | Pos. | Nation | Player |
|---|---|---|---|
| — | MF | CHN | Hu Jiajin (at Jiangxi Dingnan United until 31 December 2026) |
| — | DF | CHN | Zhang Yujie (at Jiangxi Dingnan United until 31 December 2026) |
| — | DF | CHN | Hu Ruibao (at Yunann Yukun until 31 December 2026) |
| — | FW | CHN | Zhao Boyang (at Xiamen Feilu until 31 December 2026) |

== Coaching staff ==
| Role | Name |
|---|---|
| Head coach | (Scotland) Robbie Neilson |
| Assistant coach | (Scotland) Gordon Forrest |
| Assistant coach | (China) Dong Xuesheng |
| Goalkeeping coach | (Germany) Milenko Gilić |
| Goalkeeping assistant coach | (China) Wei Jian |
| Fitness coach | (England) Michael Yau |
| Director of performance and health | (Brazil) Rodrigo De Melo |

== Managerial history ==
- (China) Cheng Liang (31 December 2017 – 30 May 2018)
- (Croatia) Dario Dabac (7 June 2018 – 11 January 2019)
- (China) Wang Hongwei (27 February 2019 – 18 May 2020)
- (China) Li Yi (22 July 2020 – 25 December 2021)
- (Spain) Sergio Lobera (19 January 2022 – 21 April 2023)
- (Spain) Jesús Tato (21 April 2023 – 3 October 2024)
- (Italy) Christian Lattanzio (4 October 2024 – 6 July 2025)
- (Spain) Pep Muñoz (10 July 2025 – 30 September 2025)
- (China) Chen Tao (30 September 2025 – 6 June 2026)
- (Scotland) Robbie Neilson (6 June 2026 – present)

== Honours ==
League

- **China League One**
  - Champions: 2023

== Results ==
All-time League Rankings

As of the end of 2025 season.

| Year | League | Stage | Pld | W | D | L | GF | GA | GD | Pts | Pos. | FA Cup | Super Cup | AFC | Stadium |
|---|---|---|---|---|---|---|---|---|---|---|---|---|---|---|---|
| 2017 | China Amateur Football League | Second round | 3 | 2 | 1 | 0 | 11 | 1 | 10 | 6 | Qualified | DNE | DNQ | DNQ | |
| 2017 | China Amateur Football League | Knockout stages | 2 | 0 | 1 | 1 | 3 | 4 | −3 | n/a | k/o (R16) | DNE | DNQ | DNQ | |
| 2018 | China League Two | Regular season | 28 | 6 | 10 | 12 | 24 | 27 | −3 | 28 | 24th (of 28) | QF | DNQ | DNQ | Chengdu Longquanyi Football Stadium |
| 2019 | China League Two | Regular season | 30 | 17 | 5 | 8 | 47 | 27 | 20 | 56 | 8th (of 32) | R2 | DNQ | DNQ | Chengdu Longquanyi Football Stadium |
| 2020 | China League One | Regular season | 10 | 1 | 6 | 3 | 8 | 12 | −4 | 9 | 5th (of 6) | R2 | DNQ | DNQ | |
| 2020 | China League One | Relegation stage | 5 | 2 | 2 | 1 | 6 | 5 | 1 | 8 | 3rd (of 6) | R2 | DNQ | DNQ | |
| 2021 | China League One | Regular season | 34 | 13 | 13 | 8 | 34 | 27 | 7 | 52 | 8th (of 18) | R2 | DNQ | DNQ | |
| 2022 | China League One | Regular season | 34 | 18 | 3 | 13 | 40 | 30 | 10 | 51 | 6th (of 18) | R2 | DNQ | DNQ | |
| 2023 | China League One | Regular season | 30 | 22 | 3 | 5 | 51 | 19 | 32 | 69 | 1st (of 16) | R3 | DNQ | DNQ | Shuangliu Sports Centre; Chengdong Sports Park Stadium; Suining Sports Center |
| 2024 | Chinese Super League | Regular season | 30 | 7 | 8 | 15 | 29 | 55 | -26 | 29 | 14th (of 16) | R5 | DNQ | DNQ | Bao'an Stadium |
| 2025 | Chinese Super League | Regular season | 30 | 8 | 3 | 19 | 35 | 59 | -24 | 27 | 12th (of 16) | R3 | DNQ | DNQ | Shenzhen Sports Center Stadium |

Key

| | China top division |
| | China second division |
| | China third division |
| | China fourth division |
| W | Winners |
| RU | Runners-up |
| 3 | Third place |
| | Relegated |

- Pld = Played
- W = Games won
- D = Games drawn
- L = Games lost
- F = Goals for
- A = Goals against
- Pts = Points
- Pos = Final position
- DNQ = Did not qualify
- DNE = Did not enter
- NH = Not Held
- – = Does Not Exist
- R1 = Round 1
- R2 = Round 2
- R3 = Round 3
- R4 = Round 4
- F = Final
- SF = Semi-finals
- QF = Quarter-finals
- R16 = Round of 16
- Group = Group stage
- GS2 = Second Group stage
- QR1 = First Qualifying Round
- QR2 = Second Qualifying Round
- QR3 = Third Qualifying Round
