= Zidi =

Zidi may refer to:

- Claude Zidi (born 1934), French film director and screenwriter
- Malik Zidi (born 1975), French actor
- Yu Zidi (born 2012), Chinese swimmer
- a fig cultivar
