= Athletics at the 2025 National Games of China =

Athletics at the 15th National Games of China
- Dates: 12–20 November
- Host city: Guangzhou, Zhuhai, and Shenzhen
- Venue: Guangdong Olympic Stadium
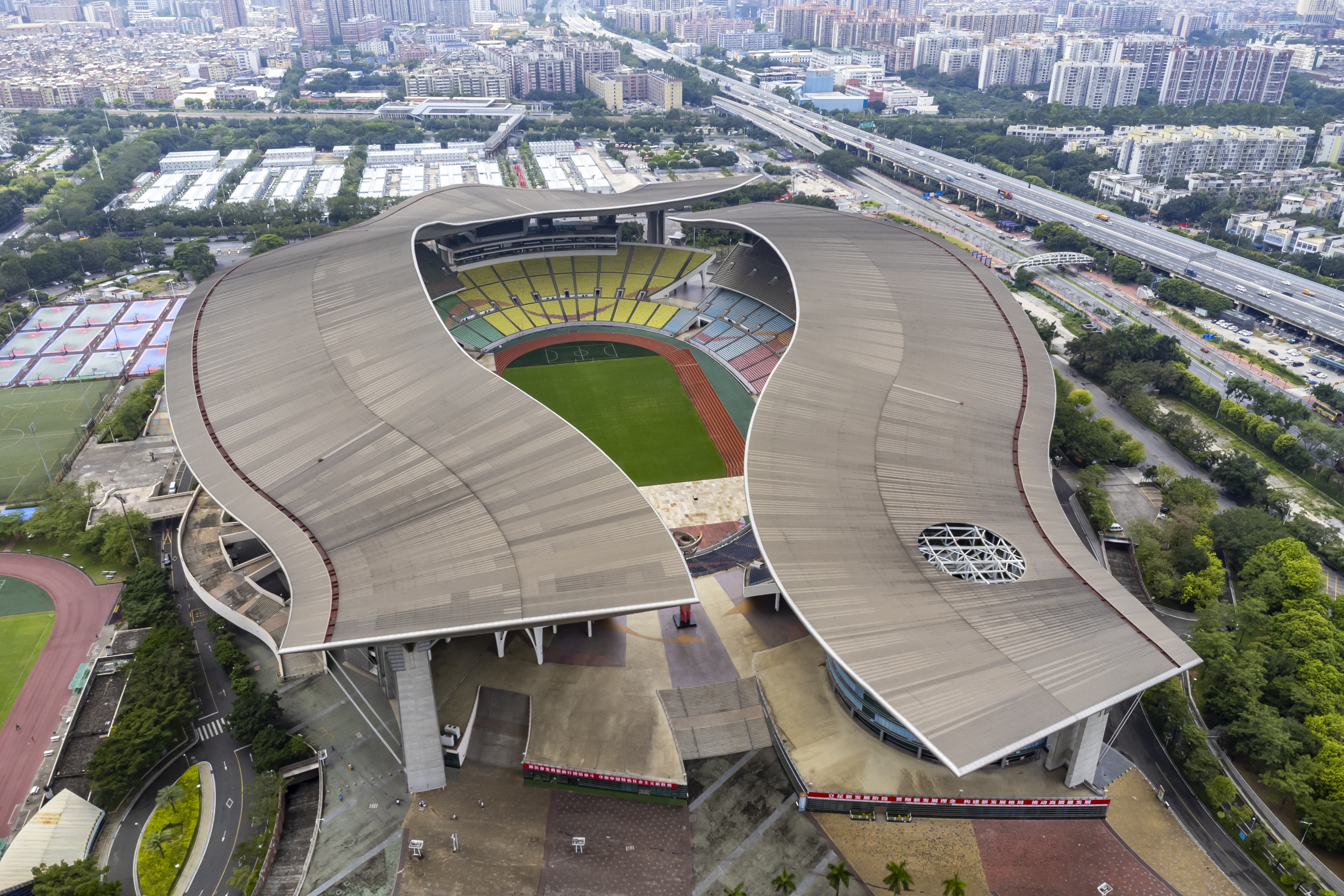
- Level: Senior
- Events: 48

At the 2025 National Games of China, the athletics events were held in three cities. Track and field events were held at the Guangdong Olympic Stadium in Guangzhou from 12 to 20 November 2025, while the marathon events were held on 15 November in Shenzhen and racewalking from 12 to 17 November in Zhuhai.

== Medal summary ==
=== Men ===
Shi Yuhao, bronze medalist at the 2025 World Championship long jump event, fouled 3 times in his preliminary attempts, missing the final.

Xi Xiaoheng shattered the national record in the 800m.

Sprint legend Su Bingtian also made his final athletics appearance in the 4 × 100 relay, finishing fourth with Guangdong. He later announced his retirement on a social media post, saying his body was telling him to "pass the baton" to younger teammates, ending his 21-year career.

Event	Gold		Silver		Bronze	
Men's 100 metres	Li Zeyang; China	10.11	Wang Shengjie; China	10.15	Zeng Keli; China	10.16
Men's 400 metres	Liu Kai; China	45.77	Zhang Jingzong; China	46.12	Zhang Qining; China	46.39
Men's 800 metres	Xi Xiaobeng; China	1:45.48	Liu Dezhou; China	1:45.84	Ma Zhongqiang; China	1:47.28
Men's 1500 metres	Liu Dezhou; China	3:42.25	Tao Peilin; China	3:44.38	Xi Xiaobeng; China	3:44.84
Men's 5000 metres	Yu Shuiqing; China	13:36.89	Jiang Fakun; China	13:38.60	Yang Kegu; China	13:44.26
Men's 10,000 metres	Tang Haoran; China	28:54.24	Yu Shuiqing; China	28:55.28	Ma Wenliang; China	29:02.45
Men's marathon	He Jie; China	2:12:07	Gao Peng; China	2:12:14	Wu Xiangdong; China	2:12:33
Men's 110 metres hurdles	Xu Wenjun; China	13.12	Liu Junxi; China	13.14	Zhu Shenglong; China	13.41
Men's 400 metres hurdles	Gong Debin; China	48.68	Xie Zhiyu; China	49.06	Xu Xinfeng; China	49.08
Men's 3000 metres steeplechase	Yu Shuiqing; China	8:40.15	Chen Yongchao; China	8:42.06	Chen Wenjie; China	8:43.01
Men's 20 kilometres race walk	Zhang Jun; China	1:19:22	Shi Shengji; China	1:19:23	Qian Haifeng; China	1:19:58
Men's 4 × 100 metres relay	Li Mengyuan; Li Zeyang; Liu Ke; Liu Yang; China	38.60	Huang Xu; Huang Yi; Xiong Feng; Ye Linyanheng; China	38.64	Wang Shuang; Sui Gaofei; Lu Weiyi; Chen Jinfeng; China	38.68
Men's 4 × 400 metres relay	Hu Xingxing; Li Yongjie; Yang Lei; Zhang Yipin; Liang Wenqiang; China	3:04.81	Chen Zhisheng; Lü Shengyuan; Li Jing; Xiao Heng; Chen Haoran; China	3:05.18	Ye An'an; Ding Wenhao; Gu Xiaofei; Shao Zhexuan; Zhong Hanzhe; China	3:05.55

=== Women ===
Event	Gold		Silver		Bronze	
Women's 100 metres	Chen Yujie; China	11.10	Wei Yongli; China	11.37	Shi Linqi; China	11.38
Women's 400 metres	Liu Yinglan; China	51.75	Mo Jiadie; China	51.87	Li Fengdan; China	53.30
Women's 800 metres	Wu Hongjiao; China	2:05.23	Li Chunhui; China	2:05.75	Rao Xinyu; China	2:06.75
Women's 1500 metres	Li Chunhui; China	4:06.28	Wu Hongjiao; China	4:11.86	Chen Yuxuan; China	4:12.82
Women's 5000 metres	Liang Tiantian; China	15:09.85	Luo Xia; China	15:11.39	He Wujia; China	15:11.80
Women's 10,000 metres	Zhang Deshun; China	32:23.40	Zhang Deshun; China	32:25.31	Ciren Cuomu; China	32:25.63
Women's marathon	Zhang Deshun; China	2:30:20	Ciren Cuomu; China	2:30:25	Lu Ying; China	2:30:44
Women's 100 metres hurdles	Liu Jingyang; China	12.81	Wu Yanni; China	12.85	Lin Yuwei; China	12.94
Women's 400 metres hurdles	Mo Jiadie; China	55.19	Kong Yingying; China	56.10	Ou Ying; China	57.29
Women's javelin throw	Su Lingdan; China	62.42	Lü Huihui; China	60.67	Dai Qianqian; China	60.11
Women's discus throw	Feng Bin; China	65.46	Wang Fang; China	62.30	Jiang Zhichao; China	59.65
Women's pole vault	Wei Lingxia; China	4.30	Du Rui; China	4.30	Zhang Zixuan; China	4.15
Women's long jump	Tan Mengyi; China	6.54	Huang Yingying; China	6.54	Chen Liwen; China	6.39

=== Mixed ===
Event	Gold		Silver		Bronze	
Mixed 4 × 400 metres relay	Liang Baotang; Kong Yingying; He Yu; Mo Jiadie; China	3:17.54	Li Yongjie; Shi Jingyun; Yang Lei; Liu Yinglan; China	3:17.66	Zhang Hanbo; Jia Zihan; Zhang Qining; Zhao Wanyu; China	3:19.99
Mixed 4 × 100 metres relay	Lin Yuwei; Ge Manqi; Xiao Yuanpeng; He Jinxian; China	40.37	Liu Xiajun; Liu Guoyi; Wang Qi; Deng Zhijian; China	40.78	Zhu Junying; Li He; Liu Ke; Li Zeyang; Li Mengyuan; Liu Yang; China	40.92
Marathon race walk mixed relay	Yang Jiayu; Shi Shengji; China	2:58:01	Li Yandong; Yang Liujing; China	—	Li Lin; Shi Yuxia; China	—
