= Swimming at the 2026 Asian Games – Women's 200 metre individual medley =

Women's 200 metre individual medley at the 2026 Asian Games
- Venue: Tokyo Aquatics Centre
- Date: 21 September 2026
- Competitors: 24 from 12 nations

Medalists
gold medal	Yu Zidi	China
silver medal	Yu Yiting	China
bronze medal	Mio Narita	Japan

The women's 200 metre individual medley event at the 2026 Asian Games took place on 21 September 2026 at the Tokyo Aquatics Centre.

== Schedule ==
All times are Japan Standard Time (UTC+09:00)

Date	Time	Event
Monday, 21 September 2026	10:52	Heats
Monday, 21 September 2026	17:52	Final

== Records ==
Prior to this competition, the existing world, Asian and Games records were as follows.

World Record	Summer McIntosh (CAN)	2:05.70	Victoria, Canada	9 June 2025
Asian Record	Yu Yiting (CHN)	2:06.82	Hangzhou, China	17 June 2026
Games Record	Yu Yiting (CHN)	2:07.75	Hangzhou, China	25 September 2023

== Results ==
=== Heats ===
Rank	Heat	Athlete	Time	Notes
1	3	Yu Yiting (CHN)	2:11.59	Q
2	3	Yu Zidi (CHN)	2:12.10	Q
3	3	Mio Narita (JPN)	2:13.44	Q
4	3	Shiho Matsumoto (JPN)	2:14.30	Q
5	2	Xeniya Ignatova (KAZ)	2:14.94	Q, NR
6	3	Lee Song-eun (KOR)	2:15.66	Q
7	2	Xiandi Chua (PHI)	2:16.24	Q
8	3	Võ Thị Mỹ Tiên (VIE)	2:17.30	Q
9	3	Kamonchanok Kwanmuang (THA)	2:18.09	Q
10	3	Han An-chi (TPE)	2:18.47	Q
11	2	Wang Xintong (HKG)	2:19.15	Reserve
12	3	Mikayla Tan (SGP)	2:19.18	Reserve
13	2	Megan Yo (SGP)	2:20.35	
14	2	Man Wui Kiu (HKG)	2:20.63	
15	2	Varissara Nopthong (THA)	2:23.65	
16	2	Valerie Tarazi (PLE)	2:24.19	
17	2	Cheang Weng Chi (MAC)	2:27.39	
18	2	Alma Shaat (PLE)	2:29.99	
19	1	Altannar Amgalan (MGL)	2:38.03	
20	1	Ujin Orkhon (MGL)	2:39.23	
21	1	Valeriya Mirenskaya (TKM)	2:43.30	
	1	Lee Hee Eun (KOR)	DNS	
	1	Sofiya Abubakirova (KAZ)	DNS	

=== Final ===
Rank	Athlete	Time	Notes
1st place, gold medalist(s)	Yu Zidi (CHN)	2:06.10	AR
2nd place, silver medalist(s)	Yu Yiting (CHN)	2:07.99	
3rd place, bronze medalist(s)	Mio Narita (JPN)	2:10.40	
4	Shiho Matsumoto (JPN)	2:13.06	
5	Han An-chi (TPE)	2:13.76	
6	Lee Song-eun (KOR)	2:13.98	
7	Xiandi Chua (PHI)	2:16.02	
8	Xeniya Ignatova (KAZ)	2:16.13	
9	Võ Thị Mỹ Tiên (VIE)	2:17.50	
10	Kamonchanok Kwanmuang (THA)	2:19.03	
