= Swimming at the 2026 Asian Games – Women's 400 metre individual medley =

Women's 400 metre individual medley at the 2026 Asian Games
- Venue: Tokyo Aquatics Centre
- Date: 23 September 2026
- Competitors: 24 from 12 nations

Medalists
gold medal	Yu Zidi	China
silver medal	Ke Wenxi	China
bronze medal	Mio Narita	Japan

The women's 400 metre individual medley event at the 2026 Asian Games took place on 23 September 2026 at the Tokyo Aquatics Centre.

== Schedule ==
All times are Japan Standard Time (UTC+09:00)

Date	Time	Event
Wednesday, 23 September 2026	10:55	Heats
Wednesday, 23 September 2026	18:15	Final

== Records ==
Prior to this competition, the existing world, Asian and Games records were as follows.

World Record	Summer McIntosh (CAN)	4:23.65	Victoria, Canada	11 June 2025
Asian Record	Ye Shiwen (CHN)	4:28.43	London, Great Britain	28 July 2012
Games Record	Ye Shiwen (CHN)	4:32.97	Incheon, South Korea	23 September 2014

== Results ==
=== Heats ===
Rank	Heat	Athlete	Time	Notes
1	2	Yu Zidi (CHN)	4:39.43	Q
2	2	Mio Narita (JPN)	4:39.79	Q
3	1	Ke Wenxi (CHN)	4:43.12	Q
4	1	Waka Kobori (JPN)	4:45.00	Q
5	2	Võ Thị Mỹ Tiên (VIE)	4:50.21	Q
6	1	Jinjutha Pholjamjumrus (THA)	4:50.69	Q
7	1	Xiandi Chua (PHI)	4:51.93	Q
8	2	Victoria Lim (SGP)	4:53.63	Q
9	1	Lee Hee-eun (KOR)	4:55.30	Q
10	2	Candice Gao (HKG)	4:56.22	Q
11	1	Ng Lai Wa (HKG)	5:06.72	Reserve
12	2	Cheang Wen Chi (MAC)	5:14.13	Reserve
13	1	Misheel Saruul (MGL)	5:50.60	
14	2	Anima Enkhbaatar (MGL)	5:57.37	
	2	Kamonchanok Kwanmuang (THA)	DNS	

=== Final ===
Rank	Athlete	Time	Notes
1st place, gold medalist(s)	Yu Zidi (CHN)	4:28.56	GR
2nd place, silver medalist(s)	Ke Wenxi (CHN)	4:32.51	
3rd place, bronze medalist(s)	Mio Narita (JPN)	4:33.45	
4	Waka Kobori (JPN)	4:37.16	
5	Võ Thị Mỹ Tiên (VIE)	4:46.35	
6	Jinjutha Pholjamjumrus (THA)	4:49.00	
7	Candice Gao (HKG)	4:50.27	
8	Lee Hee-eun (KOR)	4:52.53	
9	Xiandi Chua (PHI)	4:53.19	
10	Victoria Lim (SGP)	4:54.32	
