= Chang Mohan =

Chinese swimmer (born 2011)

Personal information
- Nationality: Chinese
- Born: 14 February 2011 (age 15)

Sport
- Sport: Swimming
Medal record
Women's swimming
Representing China
Asian Games
Silver medal – second place	2026 Aichi–Nagoya	200 m butterfly
Youth Olympic Games
Gold medal – first place	2026 Dakar	200 m freestyle
Gold medal – first place	2026 Dakar	200 m butterfly
Silver medal – second place	2026 Dakar	200 m breaststroke
Silver medal – second place	2026 Dakar	200 m medley

Chang Mohan (Chinese: 常墨涵; born 14 February 2011) is a Chinese swimmer.

== Career ==
In July 2025, Chang was selected to compete at the 2025 World Aquatics Championships. She made her World Aquatics Championships debut at 14 years old.

In September 2026, she competed at the 2026 Asian Games and won a silver medal in the 200 metre butterfly with a time of 2:08.44.

In November 2026, she competed at the 2026 Summer Youth Olympics and served as the flag bearer during the opening ceremony. She made her Youth Olympics debut on 2 November 2026, and won a silver medal in the 200 metre breaststroke with a time of 2:27.21. Two days later she won a silver medal in the 200 metre individual medley with a time of 2:13.90. On the final day of the competition she won a gold medal in the 200 metre freestyle with a time of 1:59.59. She was the only swimmer of the field to break the 2:00 barrier. She also won a gold medal in the 200 metre butterfly with a time of 2:09.93. The two event finals were held 32 minutes apart. She finished the 2026 Summer Youth Olympics as China's most decorated athlete.
