= Suining Sports Center =

Sports venue in Suining, China

- 遂宁市体育中心
- Interactive map of Suining Sports Center
- Location: Suining, Sichuan, China
- Coordinates: 30°31′13″N 105°36′01″E
- Capacity: 30,000

Tenant
- Sichuan Jiuniu (2023)

The Suining Sports Center is a sports complex located in Suining, Sichuan, China. It was most recently the home of Sichuan Jiuniu in 2023. It was the main venue for the 12th Sichuan Provincial Games, which was held in Suining from 16th to 23 August in 2014. The sports complex was built in 2012 and has a total construction area of 260,000 square meters.

The Suining Sports Center consists of two main areas: a sports area and a sports industry area. The sports area includes a 30,000-seat stadium, a 2,000-seat swimming pool, and other sports facilities. The sports industry area includes a sports hotel, a sports training center, and a sports equipment exhibition center.
