= Yang Yiming =

Chinese footballer (born 1995)

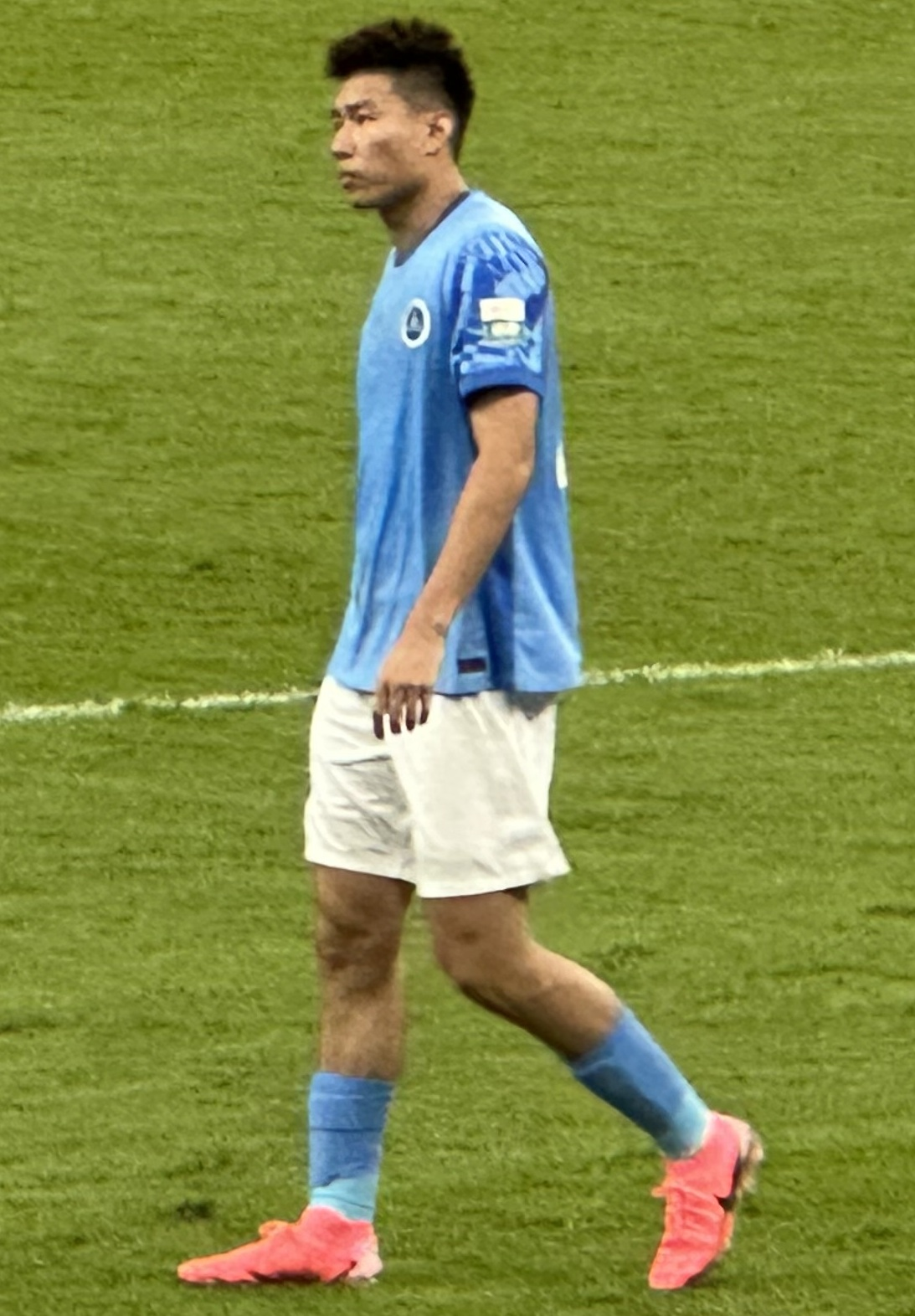
- Yang Yiming in April 2025

Personal information
- Full name: Yang Yiming
- Date of birth: 25 May 1995 (age 31)
- Place of birth: Shenzhen, Guangdong, China
- Height: 1.93 m (6 ft 4 in)
- Positions: Centre-back; forward

Team information
- Current team: Shenzhen Peng City
- Number: 23

College career
Years	Team	Apps	(Gls)
2013	Monroe Tribunes	16	(9)

Senior career*
Years	Team	Apps	(Gls)
2016–2022	Cangzhou Mighty Lions	64	(3)
2023–2024	Chengdu Rongcheng	50	(1)
2025–	Shenzhen Peng City	49	(3)
- * Club domestic league appearances and goals as of 22 November 2026

Yang Yiming (Chinese: 杨一鸣; born 25 May 1995) is a Chinese professional footballer who plays as a centre-back or forward for Chinese Super League club Shenzhen Peng City. Starting his career in the United States college system at Monroe Community College in 2013, Yang signed his first professional contract at Shijiazhuang Ever Bright in 2016. He has also played for Chengdu Rongcheng.

== College career ==
In 2013, Yang was registered as a player at the MCC Tribunes of Monroe Community College, where he scored 9 goals in 16 matches. Notably on 2 October 2013, he scored a hat-trick against the Genesee Cougars.

== Club career ==
Yang made his debut for Shijiazhuang Ever Bright (later known as the Cangzhou Mighty Lions), initially as a forward on 29 June 2016, in a Chinese FA Cup game against Hebei China Fortune FC that ended in a 3–2 defeat. He would go on to score his first goal for the club on 28 October 2018, in a league game against Yanbian FC that ended in a 3–0 victory. He would be moved to centre-back and go on to establish himself as a regular with the club in the 2019 league campaign where he would help the team to a runners-up position and promotion into the top tier.

== Career statistics ==
As of 23 July 2024

Appearances and goals by club, season and competition
Club	Season	League			National Cup		Continental		Other		Total	
Club	Season	Division	Apps	Goals	Apps	Goals	Apps	Goals	Apps	Goals	Apps	Goals
Shijiazhuang Ever Bright/ Cangzhou Mighty Lions	2016	Chinese Super League	0	0	1	0	–		–		1	0
Shijiazhuang Ever Bright/ Cangzhou Mighty Lions	2017	China League One	7	0	1	0	–		–		8	0
Shijiazhuang Ever Bright/ Cangzhou Mighty Lions	2018	China League One	6	1	0	0	–		–		6	1
Shijiazhuang Ever Bright/ Cangzhou Mighty Lions	2019	China League One	17	0	2	0	–		–		19	0
Shijiazhuang Ever Bright/ Cangzhou Mighty Lions	2020	Chinese Super League	5	0	1	0	–		–		6	0
Shijiazhuang Ever Bright/ Cangzhou Mighty Lions	2021	Chinese Super League	4	0	2	0	–		–		6	0
Shijiazhuang Ever Bright/ Cangzhou Mighty Lions	2022	Chinese Super League	25	2	2	0	–		–		27	2
Shijiazhuang Ever Bright/ Cangzhou Mighty Lions	Total		64	3	9	0	0	0	0	0	73	3
Chengdu Rongcheng	2023	Chinese Super League	22	0	1	0	–		–		23	0
Chengdu Rongcheng	2024	Chinese Super League	20	0	1	0	–		–		21	0
Chengdu Rongcheng	Total		42	0	2	0	0	0	0	0	44	0
Career total			106	3	11	0	0	0	0	0	117	3
