= 2025 National Games of China =

Multi-sport event in China

15th National Games of the People's Republic of China
- Logo of the 2025 National Games of China
- Host city: Guangdong, Hong Kong, Macau
- Country: China
- Motto: Play for the Dreams in GBA (simplified Chinese: 激情全运会，活力大湾区; traditional Chinese: 激情全運會，活力大灣區; Portuguese: Jogos Nacionais Emocionantes, Grande Baía Vibrante)
- Athletes: 14,252
- Events: 479 in 34 sports
- Opening: 9 November 2025
- Closing: 21 November 2025
- Opened by: CCP General Secretary Xi Jinping
- Closed by: CPPCC Chairman Wang Huning
- Athlete's Oath: Chen Aisen
- Judge's Oath: Yuan Xuanyun
- Coach's Oath: You Junxian
- Torch lighter: Su Bingtian, Cheung Ka Long, Li Yi
- Main venue: Guangdong Olympic Stadium (opening ceremony); Bao'an Happy Theater (closing ceremony)
- Website: Official website; Hong Kong Competition Zone official website; Macau Competition Zone official website

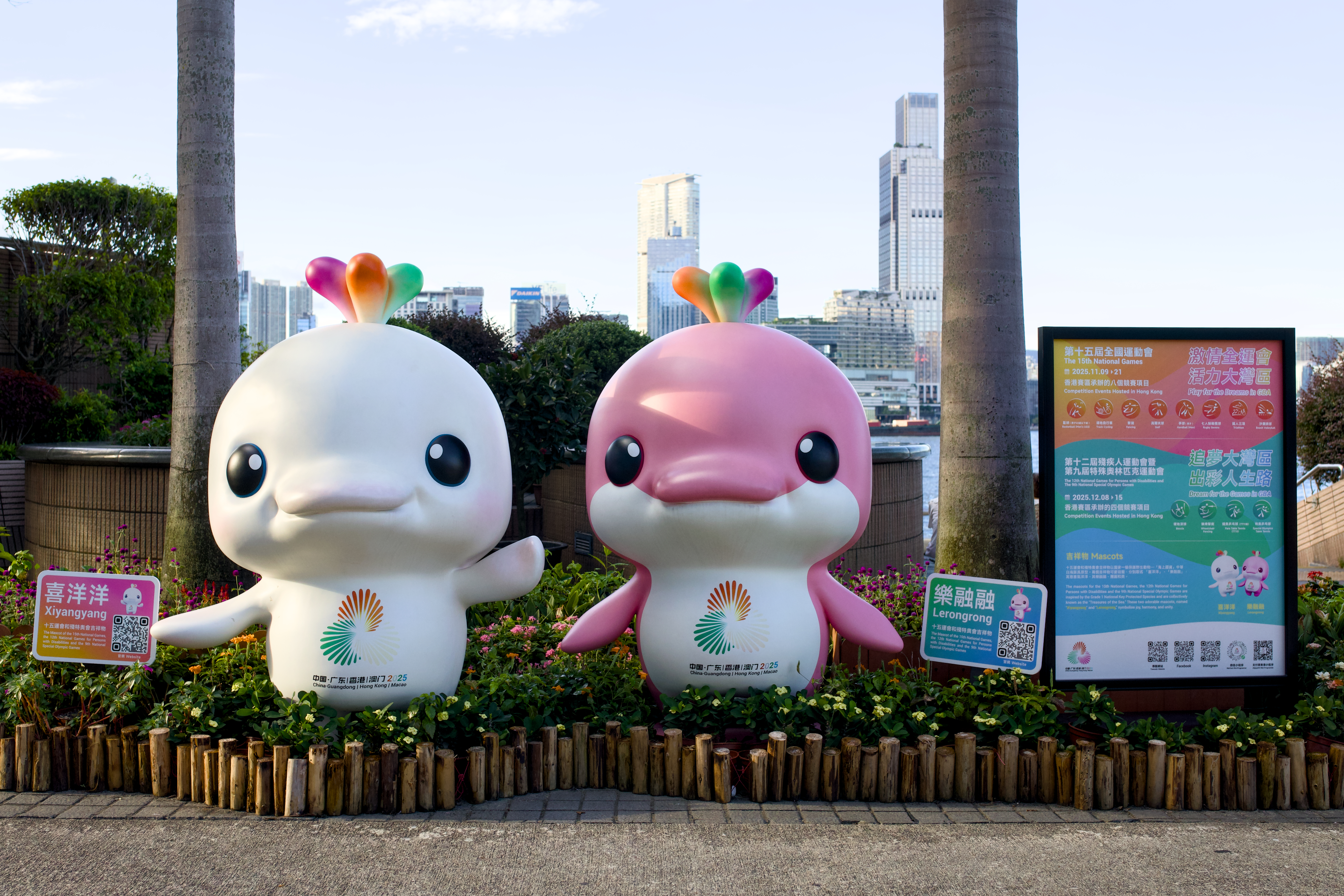
Statues of "Xi Yang Yang" and "Le Rong Rong", the 15th National Games Mascots, at the Golden Bauhinia Square, Hong Kong

The 15th National Games of China (simplified Chinese: 中华人民共和国第十五届运动会; traditional Chinese: 中華人民共和國第十五屆運動會; Portuguese: 15.ª edição dos Jogos Nacionais da República Popular da China), was a multi-sports event held throughout Guangdong, Hong Kong and Macau from 9 to 21 November 2025, though some events took place before the Games started. It was the third time Guangdong had hosted the National Games, after 1987 and 2001, and the first time the two special administrative regions of China; Hong Kong and Macau, had hosted the National Games. It was also the first time in the history of the National Games that it is co-hosted by multiple province-level regions.

== Bidding process ==
In June 2021, the General Administration of Sport of China officially issued the notice of bid for the 15th National Games. Previously, Hunan Province launched bid for the 15th National Games in 2018. Guangdong Province also intended to bid for the Games with Hong Kong, Macau and other cities in Guangdong. On 21 August 2021, the office of the State Council issued a letter, which confirmed that Guangdong, Hong Kong and Macau to host the 15th National Games.

== Torch Relay ==
The National Games conducted its ever first cross-boundary torch relay on Sunday (Nov 2), as it was held simultaneously in Hong Kong, Macau and Guangdong, one week before the Games open. Following the launch ceremony in Shenzhen, the torch relay started in Hong Kong, Macau, Guangzhou and Shenzhen - four key cities of the Greater Bay Area. A total of 200 torchbearers from all walks of life carry the flame in the four cities. Following the relay, the torch flames from the four cities will converge in Guangzhou later at Guangdong Olympic Sports Center to be merged into a single flame, which will light the main cauldron at the opening ceremony of the 15th National Games on November 9.

== Venues ==
=== Guangdong ===
16 cities hosted events in Guangdong, with Guangzhou and Shenzhen hosting around 70%.

==== Guangzhou ====
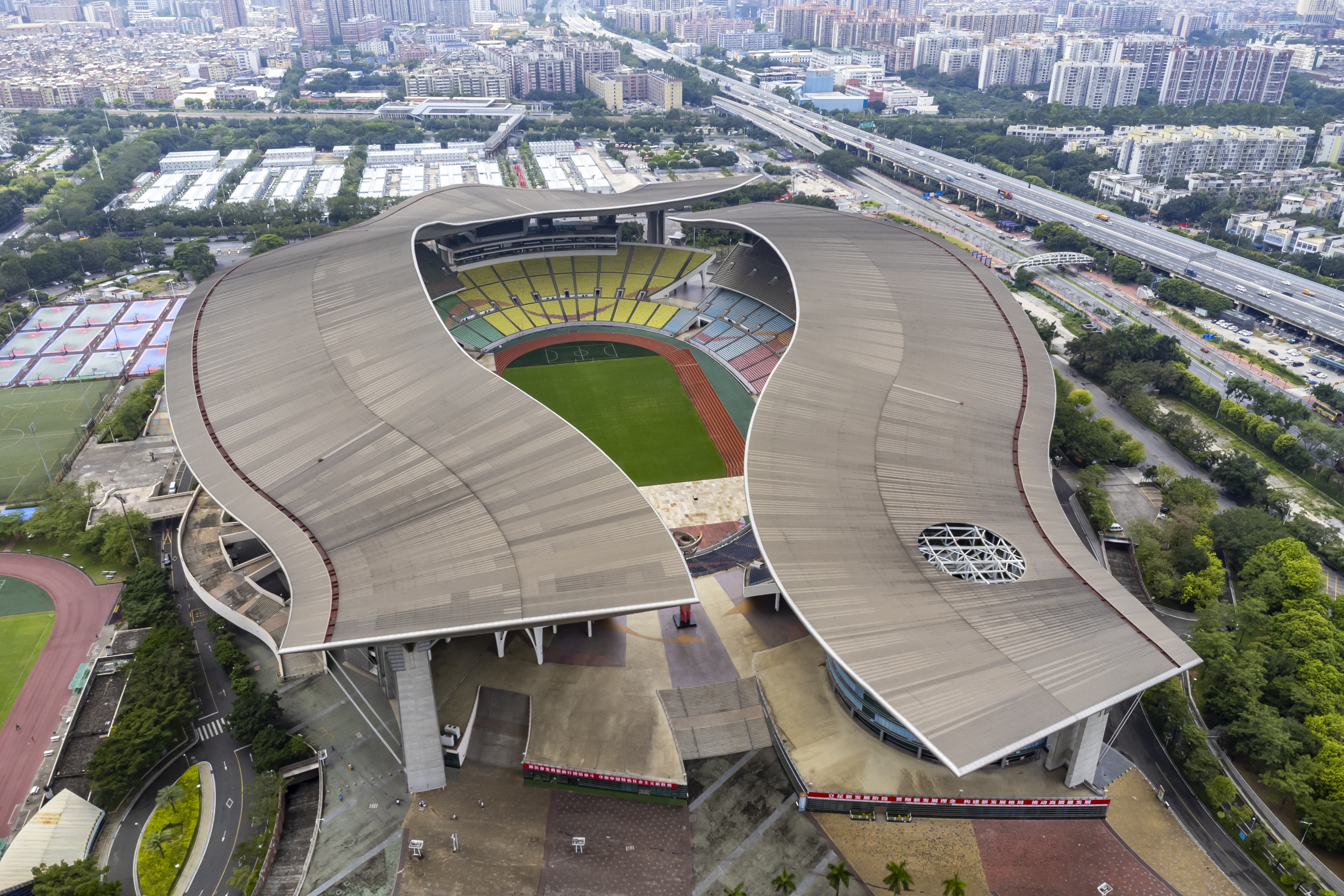
Guangdong Olympic Stadium

Venue	Events	Capacity	Status
Guangdong Olympic Sports Center Stadium	Opening ceremony	80,012	Existing
Guangdong Olympic Sports Center Stadium	Athletics (track and field)	80,012	Existing
Guangdong Olympic Sports Center Natatorium	Aquatics (diving, water polo)	4,584	Existing
Nansha Gymnasium	Wushu (taolu)	8,800	Existing
Guangdong Provincial People's Stadium	Women's U16 football	15,000	Existing
Yuexiushan Stadium	Women's U16 football	18,000	Existing
Tianhe Sports Center Stadium	Women's U16 football	54,856	Existing
Guangzhou University City Sports Center Stadium	Women's U16 football	39,346	Existing
Guangzhou University City Sports Center Rock Climbing Field	Sport climbing	1,500	Existing with temporary stands
South China Agricultural University Sports Center	Men's U20 volleyball	8,000	New
Guangzhou Sport Institute Asian Games Basketball Hall	Breaking	3,223	Existing
Guangzhou Sport Institute Asian Games Basketball Hall	Men's U20 volleyball	3,223	Existing
Tianhe Sports Center Gymnasium	Men's U18 volleyball	9,000	Existing
Guangzhou Gymnasium	Gymnastics (trampolining)	10,000	Existing
Guangzhou Gymnasium	Men's U18 volleyball	10,000	Existing
Guangdong Shooting Range	Shooting (pistol, rifle)	800	Existing
Guangzhou Skeet Training Center	Shooting (shotgun)	TBD	Existing
Guangdong International Rowing Centre	Rowing	TBD	Existing with temporary stands
Guangdong International Rowing Centre	Canoeing (sprint)	TBD	Existing with temporary stands
Guangdong National Canoe Slalom Sports Training Center	Canoeing (slalom)	TBD	Existing with temporary stands
Huangcun Sports Training Center	Modern pentathlon	TBD	Existing with temporary stands

==== Shenzhen ====
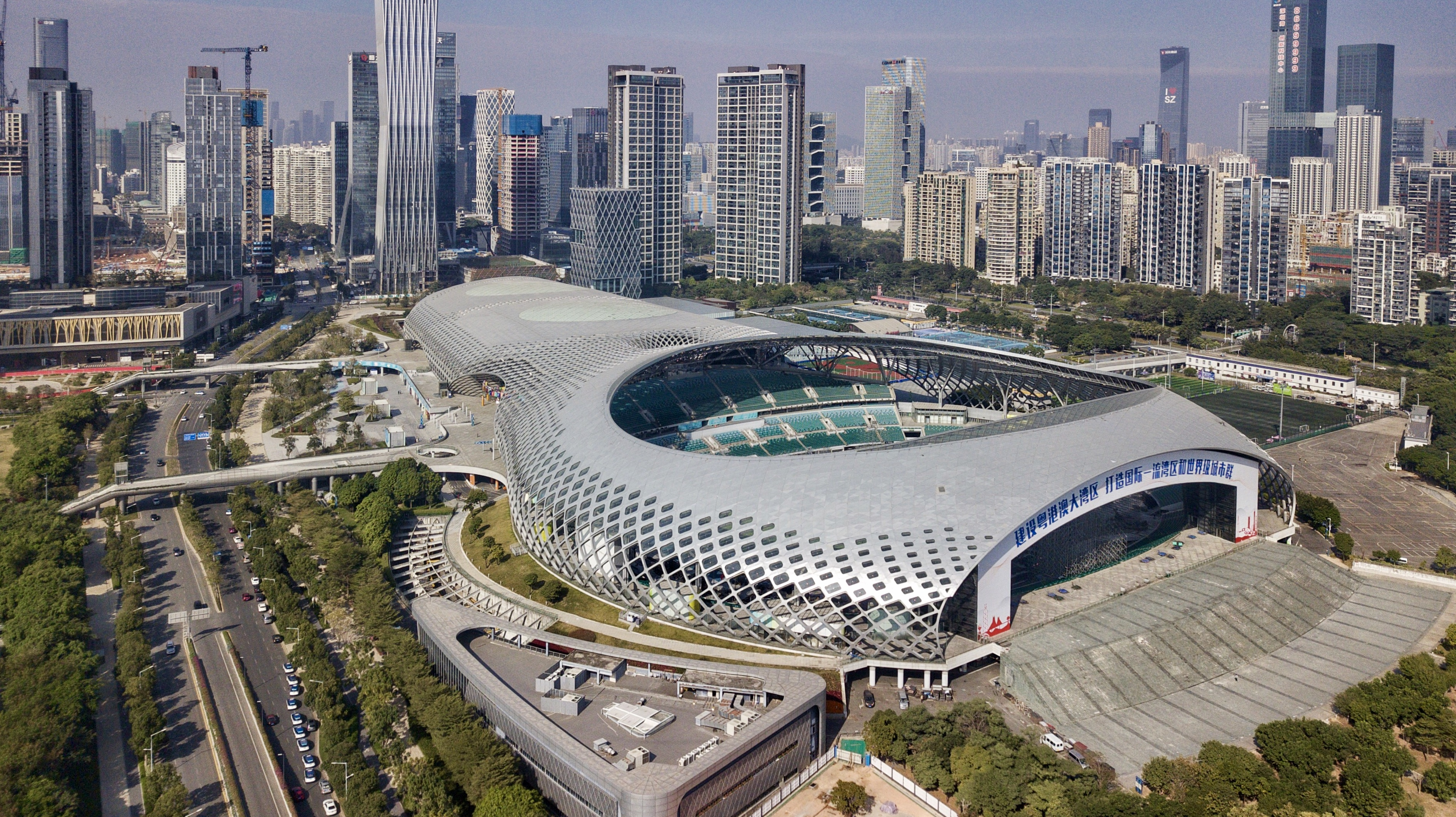
Shenzhen Bay Sports Center

Venue	Events	Capacity	Status
Bao'an Happy Theater	Closing ceremony	8,000	Existing
Shenzhen Universiade Sports Centre Stadium	Men's U20 & U18 football	60,334	Existing
Shenzhen Sports Center Stadium	Men's U20 & U18 football	45,000	Existing, replacement
Bao'an Stadium	Men's U20 & U18 football	44,050	Existing
Shenzhen Youth Football Training Base	Men's U20 & U18 football	10,000 (central field)	Existing
Shenzhen Dayun Arena	Women's U22 basketball	18,000	Existing
Shenzhen Bay Sports Center Gymnasium	Women's U22 basketball	12,793	Existing
Shenzhen Universiade Sports Centre Natatorium	Aquatics (swimming)	3,000	Existing
Shenzhen Bay Sports Center Stadium	Athletics (marathon start/finish)	20,000	Existing
Shenzhen Sports Center Arena	Badminton	16,000	Existing, replacement
Shenzhen Sports Center Fields	Archery	TBD	Temporary
Longhua Cultural and Sports Center	Women's U18 volleyball	6,478	Existing
Nanshan Cultural and Sports Center	Women's U18 volleyball	2,084	Existing
Bao'an Gymnasium	Boxing	8,188	Existing
Pingshan Sports Center Gymnasium	Gymnastics (rhythmic)	4,500	Existing
Guangming International Equestrian Center	Equestrian	800	New
Guangming District Science Park	Equestrian (cross-country)	TBD	Temporary
Hongqiao Park Freestyle BMX Field	Cycling (BMX freestyle)	780	Existing with temporary stands
Guangming District BMX Racing Field	Cycling (BMX racing)	500	Existing with temporary stands
Dapeng Jiejiaosha Open Water Swimming Stadium	Aquatics (marathon swimming)	TBD	Existing with temporary stands
Shenzhen-Hong Kong Marathon Route	Athletics (marathon)	TBD	Temporary

==== Dongguan ====
Venue	Events	Capacity	Status
Bank of Dongguan Basketball Center	Men's adult basketball	16,133	Existing
Dongguan Sports Center Gymnasium	Men's adult basketball	4,000	Existing
Shilong Middle School Gymnasium	Weightlifting	2,894	Existing

==== Foshan ====
Venue	Events	Capacity	Status
Century Lotus Stadium	Women's adult football	36,686	Existing
Nanhai Sports Center Stadium	Women's adult football	20,000	Existing
Shunde Desheng Sports Center Stadium	Women's adult football	20,000	New
Gaoming Sports Centre Stadium	Women's adult football	8,000	Existing
Shunde Desheng Sports Center Gymnasium	Women's adult basketball	12,000	New
Nanhai Sports Center Gymnasium	Women's adult basketball	10,000	Existing
Shunde Sports Center Gymnasium	Women's adult basketball	2,672	Existing

==== Huizhou ====
Venue	Events	Capacity	Status
Huizhou Gymnasium	Taekwondo	6,527	Existing
Huizhou Sports School Skateboard Park	Skateboarding	480	Existing with temporary stands

==== Jiangmen ====
Venue	Events	Capacity	Status
Taishan Gymnasium	Men's adult volleyball	3,030	Existing
Taishan Xinning Gymnasium	Men's adult volleyball	6,000	Existing
Jiangmen Sports Center Gymnasium	Women's U20 volleyball	8,500	Existing
Quanlin Golden Town	Cycling (mountain biking)	TBD	New
Jiangmen Sports Center Natatorium	Aquatics (artistic swimming)	2,200	Existing

==== Meizhou ====
Venue	Events	Capacity	Status
Wuhua County Olympic Sports Centre Stadium	Men's U16 football	27,000	Existing
Hengpi Football Town	Men's U16 football	TBD	Existing
Hengpi Football Town	Men's U16 football	TBD	Existing
Hengpi Football Town	Men's U16 football	TBD	Existing

==== Qingyuan ====
Venue	Events	Capacity	Status
Qingyuan Olympic Sports Center Gymnasium	Wrestling	9,000	Existing

==== Shantou ====
Venue	Events	Capacity	Status
Shantou University East Campus Sports Centre Gymnasium	Women's handball	8,000	Existing
Qing'ao Bay, Nan'ao County	Surfing	TBD	Temporary

==== Shanwei ====
Venue	Events	Capacity	Status
Guangdong Offshore Project Training Center	Sailing	TBD	Existing with temporary stands

==== Yangjiang ====
Venue	Events	Capacity	Status
Dajiao Bay, Hailing Island	Rowing (coastal)	TBD	Temporary

==== Yunfu ====
Venue	Events	Capacity	Status
Yunfu Sports Park Hockey Stadium	Field hockey	TBD	Existing
Yunfu Vocational School Hockey Field	Field hockey	TBD	Existing

==== Zhanjiang ====
Venue	Events	Capacity	Status
Zhanjiang Olympic Sports Center Gymnasium	Wushu (sanda)	6,286	Existing

==== Zhaoqing ====
Venue	Events	Capacity	Status
Zhaoqing Sports Center Stadium	Women's U18 football	25,000	Existing
Zhaoqing New District Sports Center Football Field and Training Ground	Women's U18 football	350	Existing
Zhaoqing New District Sports Center Football Field and Training Ground	Women's U18 football	TBD	Existing
Zhaoqing New District Sports Center Gymnasium	Gymnastics (youth artistic)	8,000	Existing
Zhaoqing Sports Center Gymnasium	Gymnastics (adult artistic)	3,220	Existing
Sihui Sports Center Gymnasium	Judo	5,050	Existing

==== Zhongshan ====
Venue	Events	Capacity	Status
Zhongshan International Baseball and Softball Center	Baseball	3,000	Existing
Zhongshan International Baseball and Softball Center	Softball	2,000	Existing
Shaxi Sports Center Gymnasium	Women's U18 basketball	2,828	Existing
Zhongshan Gymnasium	Women's U18 basketball	5,000	Existing

==== Zhuhai ====
Venue	Events	Capacity	Status
Hengqin International Tennis Center	Tennis	5,000 (center court)	Existing
Jinwan Highway	Athletics (race walking)	TBD	Temporary
Hong Kong–Zhuhai–Macau Bridge	Cycling (men's road race)	TBD	Temporary

=== Hong Kong ===
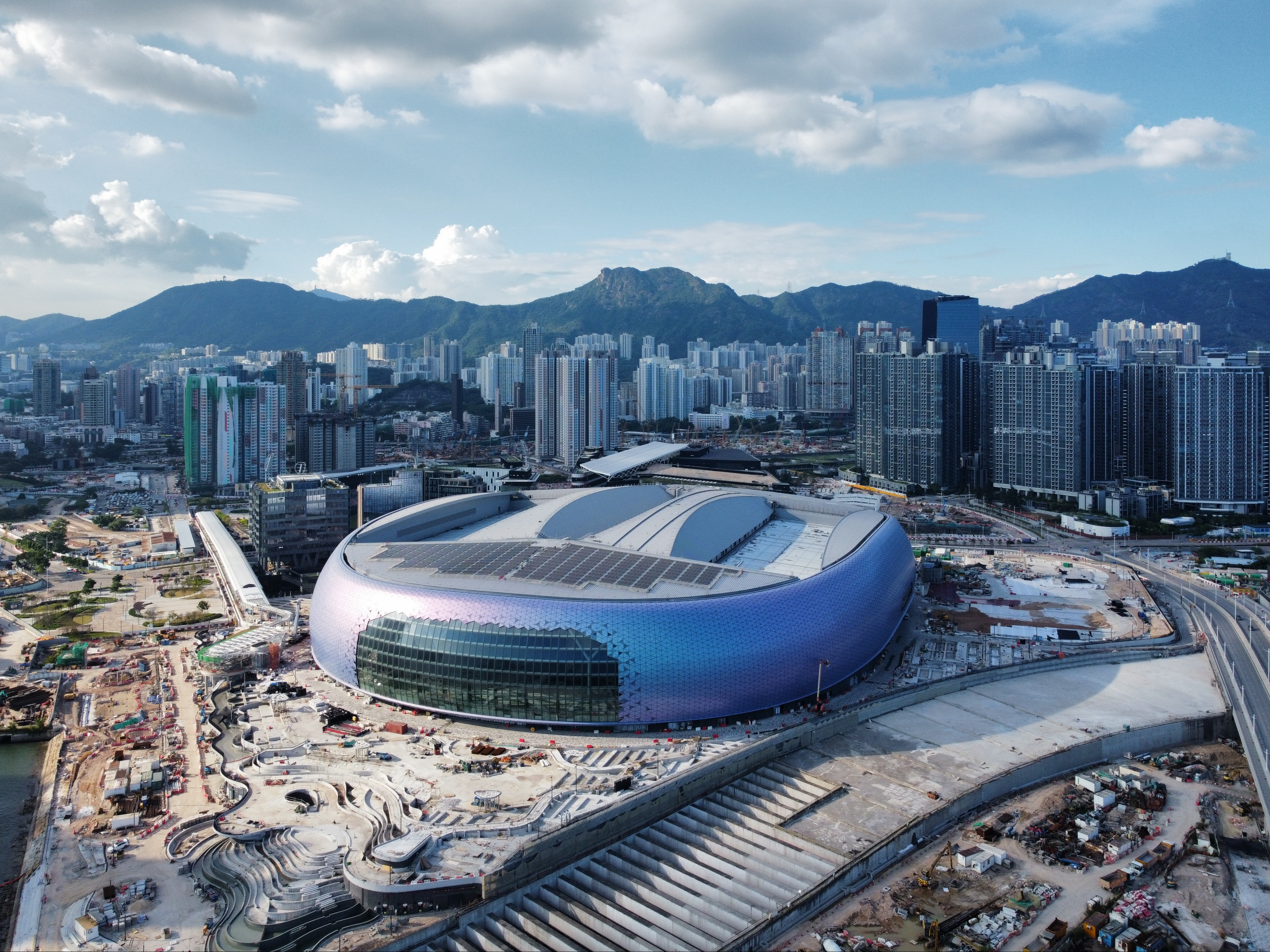
Kai Tak Sports Park

Venue	Events	Capacity	Status
Kai Tak Sports Park Stadium	Rugby sevens	50,000	Existing
Kai Tak Sports Park Arena	Men's handball	10,000	Existing
Kai Tak Sports Park Arena	Fencing	10,000	Existing
Hong Kong Coliseum	Men's U22 basketball	12,500	Existing
Hong Kong Velodrome	Cycling (track)	3,000	Existing
Hong Kong Golf Club	Golf	TBD	Existing with temporary stands
Victoria Park	Beach volleyball	TBD	Temporary
Central Harbourfront and Victoria Harbour	Triathlon	TBD	Temporary
Shenzhen-Hong Kong Marathon Route	Athletics (marathon)	TBD	Temporary
Hong Kong–Zhuhai–Macau Bridge	Cycling (men's road race)	TBD	Temporary

=== Macau ===
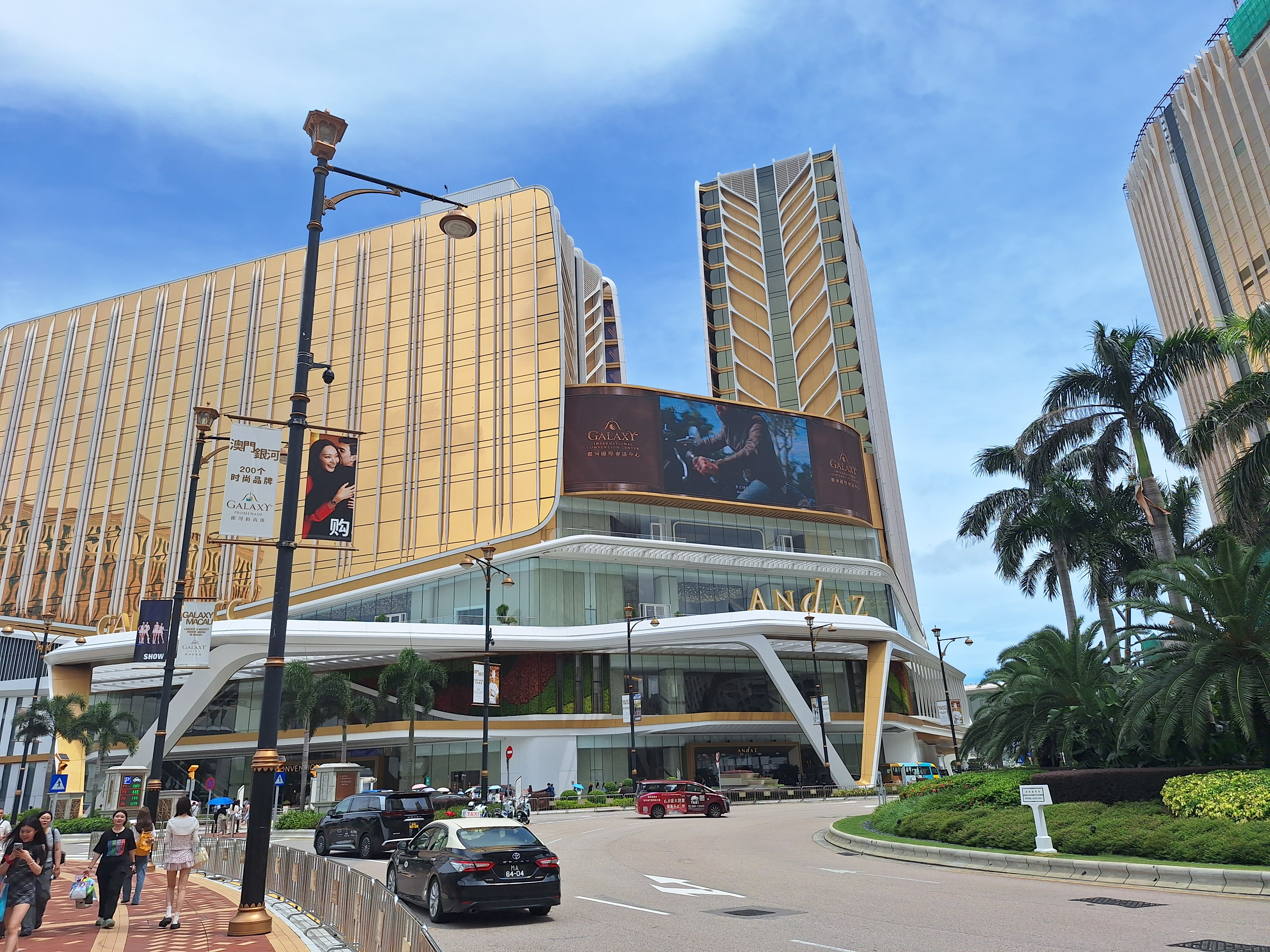
Galaxy International Convention Center

Venue	Events	Capacity	Status
Wynn Palace	3x3 basketball	TBD	Temporary
Studio City	Men's U18 basketball	5,000	Existing
Tap Seac Multi-sports Pavilion	Men's U18 basketball	4,000	Existing
Galaxy Arena	Table tennis	16,000	Existing
Venetian Arena	Women's adult volleyball	14,000	Existing
Macau East Asian Games Dome	Women's adult volleyball	7,000	Existing
Hong Kong–Zhuhai–Macau Bridge	Cycling (men's road race)	TBD	Temporary

== Sports ==
- Aquatics
  - Artistic swimming (2)
  - Diving (14)
  - Marathon swimming (2)
  - Swimming (41)
  - Water polo (2)
- Archery (6)
- Athletics (49)
- Badminton (9)
- Baseball
  - Baseball (1)
  - Softball (1)
- Basketball
  - Adult basketball (2)
  - U22 basketball (2)
  - U18 basketball (2)
  - 3x3 basketball (2)
- Boxing (13)
- Breaking (2)
- Canoeing
  - Slalom (6)
  - Sprint (12)
- Cycling
  - BMX freestyle (2)
  - BMX racing (2)
  - Mountain biking (?)
  - Road cycling (4)
  - Track cycling (14)
- Equestrian
  - Dressage (2)
  - Eventing (2)
  - Jumping (2)
- Fencing (12)
- Field hockey (2)
- Football
  - Adult football (1)
  - U22 football (1)
  - U20 football (1)
  - U18 football (2)
  - U16 football (1)
- Golf (4)
- Gymnastics
  - Artistic (20)
  - Rhythmic (2)
  - Trampoline (2)
- Handball (2)
- Judo (15)
- Modern pentathlon (2)
- Rowing
  - Rowing (16)
  - Coastal rowing (3)
- Rugby sevens (2)
- Sailing (10)
- Shooting (22)
- Skateboarding (4)
- Sport climbing (6)
- Surfing (2)
- Table tennis (10)
- Taekwondo (?)
- Tennis (6)
- Triathlon (3)
- Volleyball
  - Adult volleyball (2)
  - U20 volleyball (2)
  - U18 volleyball (2)
  - Beach volleyball (2)
- Weightlifting (20)
- Wrestling
  - Freestyle (12)
  - Greco-Roman (6)
- Wushu
  - Taolu (5)
  - Sanda (7)

== Calendar ==
The events schedule included events took place from 30 October to 21 November.

All times and dates use China Standard Time (UTC+8)

OC	Opening ceremony	●	Event competitions	1	Gold medal events	CC	Closing ceremony

October/November 2025	October		November																					Gold medals
October/November 2025	30 Thu	31 Fri	1 Sat	2 Sun	3 Mon	4 Tue	5 Wed	6 Thu	7 Fri	8 Sat	9 Sun	10 Mon	11 Tue	12 Wed	13 Thu	14 Fri	15 Sat	16 Sun	17 Mon	18 Tue	19 Wed	20 Thu	21 Fri	Gold medals
Ceremonies											OC												CC	—N/a
Archery																●	●	1	1	1	2	1		6
Artistic swimming															●	1	1							2
Athletics														2	●	●	4	8	6	8	9	12		49
Badminton									●	●	●	●	●	●	2	2	●	●	●	●	●	5		9
Baseball														●	●	●		●	●		●	1		1
Basketball						●	●	●	●	●	●	●	●	1	1	●	1	1	●	1	●	1		6
3x3 basketball														●	●	●	2							2
Beach volleyball		●	●	●	●	●	●	●	●	1		1												2
Boxing			2	2	2	3	4	●	●	●		●	●	●	●	●								13
Breakdancing																				1	1			2
Canoeing (sprint)																		●	4	●	4	4		12
Canoeing (slalom)														●	2	2	2							6
Cycling (BMX)																					2			2
Cycling (road)									2	1	1													4
Cycling (track)															2	3	3	3	3					14
Diving				1	1	2	2	2	2	●		2	2											14
Equestrian												1	●	1	●	●	2		1		1			6
Fencing																	2	2	2	2	2	2		12
Field hockey	●	●	●	●	●	●	●	●	●	●		●	●	●	●	1	1							2
Football			●		●	●	●	●	●	●	●	●	●	1	●		1							6
Golf															●	●	●	4						4
Gymnastics (artistic)												●	●	1	1	2	1	5	5					20
Gymnastics (rhythmic)										●	●	2												2
Handball			●	●	●	●	●		●	●		1												2
Judo												5	4	5	1									15
Marathon swimming							1	1																2
Rugby sevens														●	●	2								2
Rowing								●	●	●		8	8											16
Coastal rowing																		●	1	2				3
Shooting															●	2	1			●	2	1		22
Skateboarding												●	4											4
Softball												●	●	●	●	●		●	●	1				1
Sport climbing														●	2	2	2							6
Surfing															●	●	●	2						2
Swimming												4	4	5	5	5	5	5	8					41
Table tennis									●	●	●	●	1	●	2	1	2	2	●	●	1	1		10
Tennis											●	●	●	2	●	●	●	●	●	●	2	2		6
Triathlon																	2	1						3
Volleyball			●	●	●	●	●	●	●	●		●	●	1	●	●	●	1	●	2	1	1		6
Water polo																		●	●	●	●	●	1	2
Weightlifting												2	2	2	2	2		2	2	2	2	2		20
Wrestling												4	5	5	4									18
Wushu (Sanda)									3	3		1												7
Wushu (Taolu)															●	●	●	5						5
Daily medal events	0	0	2	3	3	5	6	4	7	5	1	37	37	36	37	41	47	38	41	43	40	45	1	479
Cumulative total	0	0	2	5	8	13	19	23	30	35	36	73	110	146	183	224	271	309	350	393	433	478	479	479
October/November 2025	October		November																					Events
October/November 2025	30 Thu	31 Fri	1 Sat	2 Sun	3 Mon	4 Tue	5 Wed	6 Thu	7 Fri	8 Sat	9 Sun	10 Mon	11 Tue	12 Wes	13 Thu	14 Fri	15 Sat	16 Sun	17 Mon	18 Tue	19 Wes	20 Thu	21 Fri	Events

The following events took place before 30 October:

Event	Date	Gold medals
Women's U16 football	30 May-10 June	1
Women's U18 football	13 June-24 June	1
Men's U16 football	4 September-15 September	1
Men's U18 football	14 October-25 October	1
Gymnastics (youth artistic)	5 September-10 September	5
Women's Handball	10 September-19 September	1
Modern pentathlon	20 September-27 September	4
Taekwondo	26 September-29 September	8
Men's Water polo	22 October-27 October	1
Trampoline	10 October-12 October	4
Shooting (pistol)	12 October-18 October	16
BMX freestyle	24 October-25 October	2
Sailing	20 October-30 October	10

== See also ==
- 2025 National Games for Persons with Disabilities of China
