= Shenzhen Sports Center Stadium =

Football stadium in Shenzhen, China

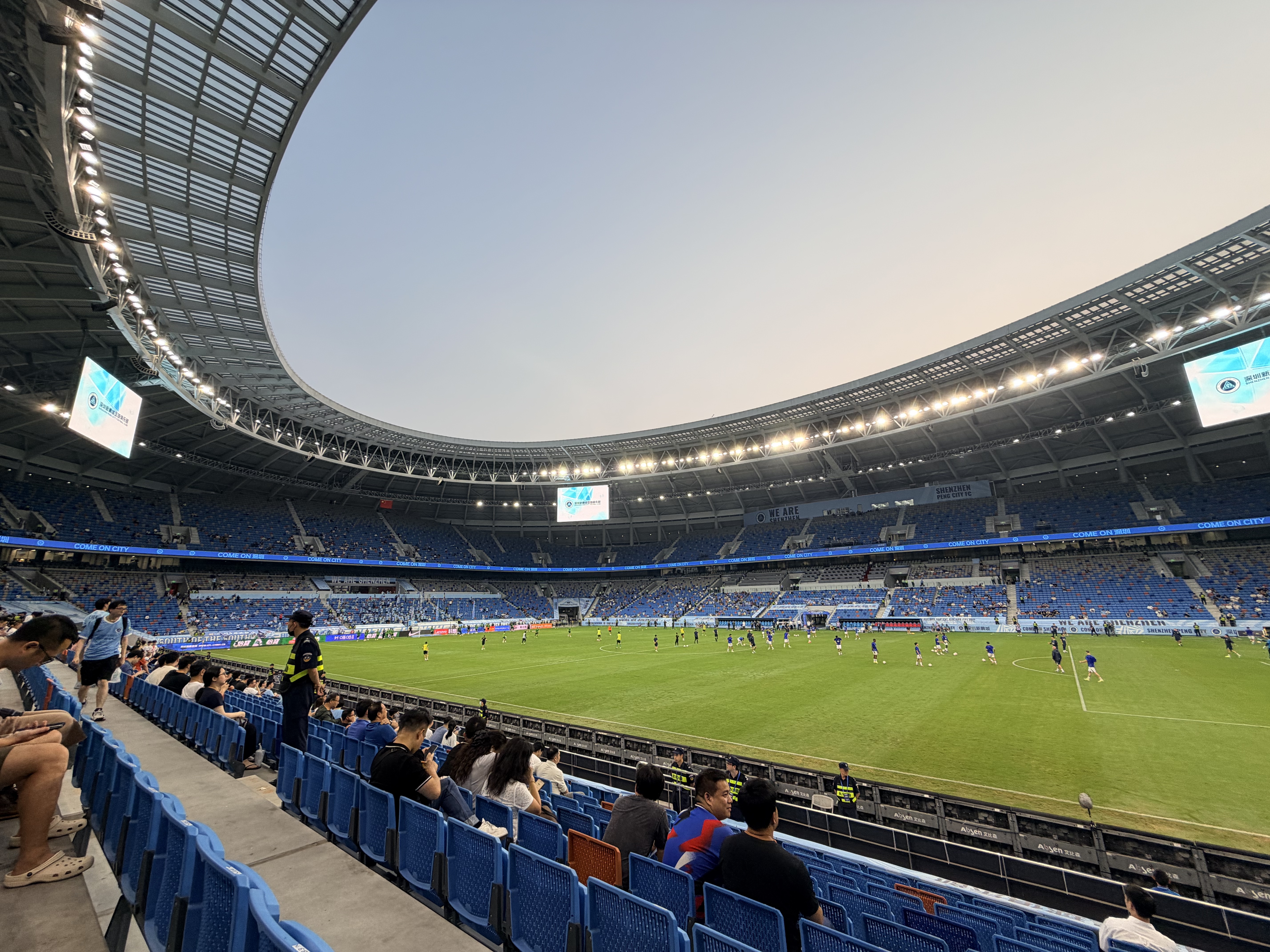
- Interactive map of Shenzhen Sports Center Stadium
- Location: Futian, Shenzhen, Guangdong, China
- Coordinates: 22°33′43.83″N 114°5′13.16″E
- Owner: Shenzhen Municipal People's Government
- Capacity: 45,000
- Surface: Grass
- Public transit: 67 at Bagualing; 714 at Huangmugang; 6 at Sports Center

Construction
- Groundbreaking: May 24, 2020; 6 years ago
- Opened: March 28, 2025; 17 months ago

Tenant
- Shenzhen Peng City (2025−present)

Shenzhen Sports Center Stadium (simplified Chinese: 深圳市体育中心体育场; traditional Chinese: 深圳市體育中心體育場; pinyin: Shēnzhèn Shì Tǐyùzhōngxīn Tǐyùchǎng) is a football stadium in Shenzhen, Guangdong, China. It is currently the home ground of Chinese Super League club Shenzhen Peng City. Construction of the stadium began in 2020 and was completed in 2025.

== History ==
In July 2018, it was reported that the Shenzhen Municipal People's Government was considering its options to expand on the existing, and aging, Shenzhen Stadium. It cited that the original Shenzhen Stadium's parking spaces and capacity were a barrier in bringing major events into the city. The plan included converting the Shenzhen Stadium lot into a sports center complex with a football-specific stadium with a capacity of 45,000 and an indoor arena with increased capacity, and a renaming from the Shenzhen Stadium to the Shenzhen Sports Center Stadium. In the 2018 plan, the new sports center was scheduled to be complete on 30 June 2020 at the latest. However, construction only began on 24 May 2020.

On 28 March 2025, the stadium welcomed Chinese Super League club Shenzhen Peng City for its first home match after its reconstruction, in front of 31,205 spectators.

Later in 2025, the stadium hosted the football event in the 2025 National Games of China.
