= Swimming at the 2026 Summer Youth Olympics – Women's 200 metre butterfly =

Women's 200 metre butterfly at the 2026 Summer Youth Olympics
- Venue: Complexe Tour de l'Oeuf
- Dates: 6 November
- Competitors: 8 from 8 nations
- Winning time: 2:09.93

Medalists
gold medal	Chang Mohan	China
silver medal	Ana Júlia Amaral	Brazil
bronze medal	Michelle Surjadi Fang	Indonesia

The women's 200 metre butterfly event at the 2026 Summer Youth Olympics took place on 6 November at the Complexe Tour de l'Oeuf in Dakar, Senegal.

== Results ==
=== Final ===
The final was held at 16:02.

Rank	Lane	Name	Nationality	Time	Notes
1st place, gold medalist(s)	4	Chang Mohan	China	2:09.93	
2nd place, silver medalist(s)	6	Ana Júlia Amaral	Brazil	2:13.01	
3rd place, bronze medalist(s)	3	Michelle Surjadi Fang	Indonesia	2:14.10	
4	5	Serafima Fokina	Russia	2:17.83	
5	7	Elvira Espinosa	Ecuador	2:18.01	
6	2	Shannon Tan Yan Qing	Malaysia	2:19.26	
7	1	Taisiia Larionova	Ukraine	2:20.36	
8	8	Alicia Story	Cook Islands	2:40.99	
