= Swimming at the 2026 Asian Games – Women's 200 metre butterfly =

Women's 200 metre butterfly at the 2026 Asian Games
- Venue: Tokyo Aquatics Centre
- Date: 20 September 2026
- Competitors: 14 from 8 nations

Medalists
gold medal	Yu Zidi	China
silver medal	Chang Mohan	China
bronze medal	Misa Okuzono	Japan

The women's 200 metre butterfly event at the 2026 Asian Games took place on 20 September 2026 at the Tokyo Aquatics Centre.

== Schedule ==
All times are Japan Standard Time (UTC+09:00)

Date	Time	Event
Sunday, 20 September 2026	10:00	Heats
Sunday, 20 September 2026	17:00	Final

== Records ==
Prior to this competition, the existing world, Asian and Games records were as follows.

World Record	Summer McIntosh (CAN)	2:01.65	Montreal, Canada	5 July 2026
Asian Record	Liu Zige (CHN)	2:01.81	Jinan, China	21 October 2009
Games Record	Zhang Yufei (CHN)	2:05.57	Hangzhou, China	24 September 2023

== Results ==
=== Heats ===
Rank	Heat	Athlete	Time	Notes
1	2	Yu Zidi (CHN)	2:07.97	Q
2	1	Chang Mohan (CHN)	2:10.67	Q
3	2	Chiho Mizuguchi (JPN)	2:11.05	Q
4	1	Kim Yun-hui (KOR)	2:11.09	Q
5	2	Misa Okuzono (JPN)	2:11.88	Q
6	1	Jinjutha Pholjamjumrus (THA)	2:12.02	Q
7	2	Lee Hee Eun (KOR)	2:12.64	Q
8	1	Võ Thị Mỹ Tiên (VIE)	2:13.33	Q
9	1	Han An-chi (TPE)	2:13.36	Q
10	1	Yeung Hoi Ching (HKG)	2:15.18	Q
11	2	Kamonchanok Kwanmuang (THA)	2:16.09	Reserve
12	2	Mya Lynn Mathis (HKG)	2:17.84	Reserve
13	2	Amun Batkhuu (MGL)	2:53.98	
14	1	Tsolmon Enkhtur (MGL)	3:41.97	

=== Final ===
Rank	Athlete	Time	Notes
1st place, gold medalist(s)	Yu Zidi (CHN)	2:05.08	GR
2nd place, silver medalist(s)	Chang Mohan (CHN)	2:08.44	
3rd place, bronze medalist(s)	Misa Okuzono (JPN)	2:09.67	
4	Kim Yun-hui (KOR)	2:09.81	
5	Chiho Mizuguchi (JPN)	2:10.20	
6	Lee Hee Eun (KOR)	2:11.06	
7	Jinjutha Pholjamjumrus (THA)	2:12.32	
8	Võ Thị Mỹ Tiên (VIE)	2:13.53	
9	Yeung Hoi Ching (HKG)	2:14.11	
10	Han An-chi (TPE)	2:15.23	
