= Li Long (footballer) =

Chinese footballer

Li Long 리룡 李龙
Personal information
- Date of birth: 23 January 1998 (age 28)
- Place of birth: Yanbian, Jilin, China
- Height: 1.72 m (5 ft 8 in)
- Position: Left winger

Team information
- Current team: Shenzhen Peng City
- Number: 14

Youth career
- Yanbian FC
- 2019: Guangzhou R&F

Senior career*
Years	Team	Apps	(Gls)
2017–2018	Yanbian Funde	36	(0)
2019–2020	Kunshan FC	2	(0)
2020–2021	Meixian 433	0	(0)
2021–2022	Sichuan Minzu	12	(1)
2022–2025	Yanbian Longding	81	(9)
2026–	Shenzhen Peng City	14	(0)
- * Club domestic league appearances and goals as of 22 November 2026

Li Long
- Simplified Chinese: 李龙
Transcriptions
Standard Mandarin
- Hanyu Pinyin: Lǐ Lóng
- IPA: [lì lʊ̌ŋ]

Chinese Korean name
- Chosŏn'gŭl: 리룡
Transcriptions
- Revised Romanization: Ri Ryong
- McCune–Reischauer: Ri Ryong

Li Long (Chinese: 李龙; Korean: 리룡; born 23 January 1998) is a Chinese footballer who currently plays for Chinese Super League side Shenzhen Peng City.

== Club career ==
Li Long was promoted to the Chinese Super League side Yanbian Funde's first team squad in the 2017 season. On 29 April 2017, he made his senior debut in a 1–0 home win against Changchun Yatai as the benefit of the new rule of the league that at least one Under-23 player must be in the starting line-up and was substituted off in the 11th minute.

On 21 February 2019, Li transferred to Chinese Super League side Guangzhou R&F. He was not included in the first team and was freely allowed to join third tier club Kunshan FC on 26 June 2019.

On 4 January 2026, Li joined Chinese Super League club Shenzhen Peng City.

== Personal life ==
Li Long's twin brother Li Qiang is also a footballer who plays for Yanbian's reserve team.

== Career statistics ==
As of 19 May 2024.

Appearances and goals by club, season and competition
Club	Season	League			National Cup		Continental		Other		Total	
Club	Season	Division	Apps	Goals	Apps	Goals	Apps	Goals	Apps	Goals	Apps	Goals
Yanbian Funde	2017	Chinese Super League	21	0	1	0	-		-		22	0
Yanbian Funde	2018	China League One	15	0	1	0	-		-		16	0
Yanbian Funde	Total		36	0	2	0	0	0	0	0	38	0
Kunshan FC	2019	China League Two	2	0	0	0	-		-		2	0
Meixian 433	2020	Chinese Champions League	0	0	-		-		-		0	0
Sichuan Minzu	2021	China League Two	12	1	1	0	-		-		13	1
Yanbian Longding	2022	China League Two	15	4	1	0	-		-		16	4
Yanbian Longding	2023	China League One	19	1	2	0	-		-		21	1
Yanbian Longding	2024	China League One	7	0	1	1	-		-		8	1
Yanbian Longding	Total		41	5	4	1	0	0	0	0	45	6
Career total			91	6	7	1	0	0	0	0	98	7
