= Yu Zidi =

Chinese swimmer (born 2012)

Personal information
- Born: October 16, 2012 (age 14) Baoding, Hebei, China

Sport
- Sport: Swimming
- Club: Hebei Taihua Jinye Swimming Club
Medal record
Women's swimming
Representing China
World Championships (LC)
Bronze medal – third place	2025 Singapore	4×200 m freestyle
Asian Games
Gold medal – first place	2026 Aichi–Nagoya	200 m butterfly
Gold medal – first place	2026 Aichi–Nagoya	200 m medley
Gold medal – first place	2026 Aichi–Nagoya	400 m medley

Chinese name
- Chinese: 于子迪
Transcriptions
Standard Mandarin
- Hanyu Pinyin: Yú Zǐdí
- IPA: [y̌ tsɹ̩̀tǐ]

Yu Zidi (Chinese: 于子迪; pinyin: Yú Zǐdí, born October 16, 2012) is a Chinese swimmer. She gained worldwide recognition when she was chosen to represent China at the 2025 World Aquatics Championships at 12 years old. At the 2026 Asian Games, she won gold medals in the 200 metre butterfly, 200 metre individual medley and 400 metre individual medley, setting an Asian Games record in the 200 metre butterfly and 400 metre individual medley and an Asian and world junior record in the 200 metre individual medley. She was named the Female Most Valuable Player (MVP) of the 2026 Asian Games.

== Early life ==
Yu was born in Baoding, Hebei, China, on October 16, 2012. When she was six years old, her father took her to a water park to cool off during the summer. She was noticed by a swim coach, who encouraged her to begin swimming competitively. Three years later, she moved to Hengshui and began training at the Hebei Taihua Jinye Swimming Club.

Yu trains with Li Bingjie everyday, an Olympic medalist who is also from Baoding, Hebei. She considers Li her "idol" and has affectionately compared Li to an "older sister". She also considers Summer McIntosh to be a role model.

== Career ==
=== 2024 season ===
In April 2024, at the age of 11, Yu participated in the Chinese National Swimming Championships, aiming to qualify for the 2024 Summer Olympics. In the 400 m freestyle, Yu produced a time of 4:10.73 in the heats followed by a final mark of 4:12.10 to place 7th in the final. In the 400 m individual medley, she finished with a time of 4:40.97 to win the silver. Her time was just about two seconds away from the qualifying time of 4:38.53.

=== 2025 season ===
In May 2025, at the age of 12, Yu participated in the Chinese National Swimming Championships. In the 200 m individual medley, Yu swam with a time of 2:10.63, winning the silver and easily clearing the World Aquatics "A" standard needed to qualify for the World Championships. She also set the record for the fastest time ever for a 12-year-old in that discipline. In the 200 m butterfly, Yu delivered a performance of 2:06.83 to win gold and qualify for the World Championships. In the 400 m individual medley, Yu crushed a lifetime best of 4:35.53 to take the gold and easily clear the World Aquatics "A" standard.

Based on her results at the Chinese Nationals, Yu was chosen to participate in the World Championships. While World Aquatics typically requires swimmers to be 14 years old to attend, Yu was eligible because her times met the association's "A" standard. Following this, she attracted worldwide media coverage, including comparisons to young champion swimmers Summer McIntosh (who won gold at the World Championships at 15), Katie Ledecky (who won Olympic gold at 15), and Kyoko Iwasaki (who won Olympic gold at 14). She is the second-youngest swimmer to ever appear at the World Aquatics Championships, after Bahrain's Alzain Tareq, who debuted at age 10 at the 2015 edition.

In her first event of the 2025 World Aquatics Championships in Singapore, Yu qualified for the final of the 200 m individual medley. She became the youngest swimmer in history to compete in a World Championship final. In the final, she finished in fourth place with a time of 2:09.21, just 0.06 seconds behind bronze medalist Mary-Sophie Harvey of Canada. In the 200 m butterfly, Yu placed fourth as well with a time of 2:06.43, just 0.31 seconds behind Australia's Elizabeth Dekkers. Yu swam in the heats for the Chinese team in the 4 × 200 m freestyle relay, helping them qualify to the final. Although she was replaced in the final by Liu Yaxin, she shared in the team's bronze medal win, becoming the youngest swimmer to win a medal at the World Aquatics Championships. The Sydney Morning Herald further identified her as the youngest swimmer to win a global championship medal since 12-year-old Inge Sørensen's bronze in the 200 m breaststroke at the 1936 Summer Olympics. Yu finished in Singapore with a third fourth-place finish in the 400 m individual medley, her time of 4:33.76 just falling half a second outside Jenna Forrester of Australia and Mio Narita of Japan who tied at 4:33.26 for silver.

In November, at the age of 13, Yu competed in the National Games of China in Shenzhen. In the 200 m individual medley, she won the gold medal in a time of 2:07.41, which broke the Asian record of 2:07.57 set by countrywoman Ye Shiwen in 2012. In the 200 m butterfly, she finished with a time of 2:06.57 to win silver. In the 400 m individual medley, she clocked 4:34.33 for the gold.

Yu was named the World Junior Female Swimmer of the Year by SwimSwam. Yu was nominated for the 2026 Laureus World Sports Awards for World Breakthrough of the Year.

=== 2026 season ===
In June 2026, Yu participated in the Chinese National Swimming Championships. In the 200 m butterfly, Yu claimed victory with a time of 2:06.12. In the 200 m individual medley, however, she finished in a time of 2:09.33, more than two and a half seconds behind Yu Yiting who blasted a new Asian Record in the event in 2:06.82. In the 400m individual medley, she won gold with a new lifetime best of 4:30.79.

In September, Yu competed in the Asian Games in Tokyo. In the 200 m butterfly, she won gold with a new lifetime best of 2:05.08, wiping out Olympic champion Zhang Yufei's Asian Games record of 2:05.57 established in 2023. In the 200 m individual medley, she swam 2:06.10, setting a new Asian Record and World Junior Record. That swim is also the second-fastest swim in the history of the event. In the 400 m individual medley, she touched in 4:28.56, erasing Olympic champion Ye Shiwen's Asian Games record of 4:32.97 set in 2014. She was named the Female MVP of the 2026 Asian Games.

== Personal best times ==
=== Long course metres (50 m pool) ===
Event	Time	Meet	Location	Date	Notes	Ref
200 m butterfly	2:05.08	2026 Asian Games	Tokyo, Japan	20 September 2026		
200 m individual medley	2:06.10	2026 Asian Games	Tokyo, Japan	21 September 2026	AS, NR, WJR	
400 m individual medley	04:28.56	2026 Asian Games	Tokyo, Japan	23 September 2026		

Legend: WR – World record; AS – Asian record; NR – Chinese record; e – equalled existing record; WJR – World junior record;
Records not set in finals: h – heat; sf – semifinal; r – relay 1st leg; rh – relay heat 1st leg; b – B final; † – en route to final mark; so – swim-off; tt – time trial

== Records ==
=== Long course metres (50 m pool) ===
No.	Event	Time	Meet	Location	Date	Age	Type	Status	Ref
1	200 m individual medley	02:07.41	2025 National Games of China	Shenzhen, China	11 November 2025	13	AS, NR	Former	
2	200 m individual medley (2)	2:06.10	2026 Asian Games	Tokyo, Japan	21 September 2026	13	AS, NR, WJR	Current	

Legend: WR – World record; AS – Asian record; NR – Chinese record; e – equalled existing record; WJR – World junior record;
Records not set in finals: h – heat; sf – semifinal; r – relay 1st leg; rh – relay heat 1st leg; b – B final; † – en route to final mark; so – swim-off; tt – time trial
