= Zhaoqing New District Sports Center Stadium =

Sports complex in Zhaoqing, China

- 肇庆新区体育中心体育场
- Interactive map of Zhaoqing New District Sports Center Stadium
- Location: Changli Avenue West, Zhaoqing New District, Zhaoqing, Guangdong, China
- Coordinates: 23.212012°N 112.604327°E
- Owner: Zhaoqing Municipal Government
- Operator: Zhaoqing Ruifeng Sports Investment Co., Ltd.
- Capacity: 20,000 (football stadium); 8,000 (indoor gymnasium)
- Surface: Natural grass (football field), hardwood (indoor courts)
- Field size: 105m × 68m (football pitch)

Construction
- Groundbreaking: 2016
- Opened: March 28, 2018
- Cost: ¥1.2 billion (total complex)
- Architect: Guangdong Provincial Architectural Design Institute

Tenants
- Guangdong Provincial Games (2018–present); Major concerts and cultural events

The Zhaoqing New District Sports Center Stadium is a multi-purpose sports complex in Zhaoqing New District, Guangdong Province. Completed in 2018 as the main venue for the Guangdong Provincial Games, it features a 20,000-seat football stadium, an 8,000-seat indoor gymnasium, and a 244,399 m^{2} football park with training facilities. The complex was designed by the Guangdong Provincial Architectural Design Institute with a total investment of ¥1.2 billion, incorporating green building technologies and traditional Lingnan cultural elements.

== Design and architecture ==
The stadium's design draws from Zhaoqing's heritage as the "City of Inkstones," featuring a roof structure resembling an inkstone's flowing contours. The lighting system uses over 4,000 LED lights to create an "ink-painting-style starry sky" effect.

== Major events ==
Hosted opening/closing ceremonies and football matches of 2018 Guangdong Provincial Games. Attracted 300+ athletes, broadcast nationally for the 2018 National Gymnastics Championships. and it hosted the 2023 Guangdong University Gas Volleyball Championship, Featured 23 teams from across the province.
