= 2020 China League One =

China League One
- Season: 2020
- Dates: 12 September – 8 November
- Champions: Changchun Yatai (2nd title)
- Promoted: Changchun Yatai
- Matches: 141
- Goals: 323 (2.29 per match)
- Top goalscorer: Tan Long (11 goals)
- Biggest home win: Zhejiang Energy Greentown 4–0 Jiangxi Liansheng (16 September 2020); Changchun Yatai 4–0 Nantong Zhiyun (8 October 2020); Beijing BSU 4–0 Suzhou Dongwu (15 October 2020)
- Biggest away win: Jiangxi Liansheng 0–4 Meizhou Hakka (20 September 2020); Liaoning Shenyang Urban 1–5 Zhejiang Energy Greentown (15 October 2020)
- Highest scoring: Liaoning Shenyang Urban 1–5 Zhejiang Energy Greentown (15 October 2020); Meizhou Hakka 4–2 Zhejiang Energy Greentown (29 October 2020); Nantong Zhiyun 3–3 Jiangxi Liansheng (8 November 2020)
- Longest winning run: 5 matches Chengdu Better City
- Longest unbeaten run: 11 matches Changchun Yatai
- Longest winless run: 15 matches Xinjiang Tianshan Leopard
- Longest losing run: 5 matches Jiangxi Liansheng

The 2020 China League One (Chinese: 2020中国足球协会甲级联赛) was the 17th season of the China League One, the second tier of the Chinese football league pyramid, since its establishment in 2004. The season was scheduled to begin on 29 February and end on 1 November, but was postponed following the COVID-19 pandemic in China. On 26 August 2020, Chinese Football Association announced that the season would be resumed on 12 September 2020 and 18 teams would be split into three groups in three locations, Group A in Chengdu, hosted by Chengdu Better City, Group B in Meizhou, hosted by Meizhou Hakka, and Group C in Changzhou, hosted by Kunshan F.C.

In this season, the number of teams are expanded from 16 to 18.

Changchun Yatai won the league for the second time, their first since 2003.

== Teams ==
=== Team changes ===
==== To League One ====
Teams relegated from 2019 Chinese Super League

- Beijing Renhe

Teams promoted from 2019 China League Two

- Shenyang Urban
- Chengdu Better City
- Taizhou Yuanda
- Suzhou Dongwu
- Jiangxi Liansheng
- Sichuan Jiuniu
- Kunshan F.C.

==== From League One ====
Teams promoted to 2020 Chinese Super League

- Qingdao Huanghai
- Shijiazhuang Ever Bright

Dissolved entries

- ~~Guangdong South China Tiger~~
- ~~Sichuan Longfor~~
- ~~Liaoning F.C.~~
- ~~Shanghai Shenxin~~

=== Name changes ===
- Shenyang Urban F.C. changed their name to Liaoning Shenyang Urban F.C. in April 2020.
- Zhejiang Greentown F.C. changed their name to Zhejiang Energy Greentown F.C. in September 2020.

== Clubs ==
=== Stadiums and locations ===
| Team | Head coach | City | Stadium | Capacity | 2019 season |
|---|---|---|---|---|---|
| Beijing Renhe ^{R} | (China) Wang Bo | Beijing | Beijing Fengtai Stadium | 31,043 | CSL, 16th |
| Guizhou Hengfeng | (China) Chen Mao | Guiyang | Guiyang Olympic Sports Center | 51,636 | 3rd |
| Heilongjiang Lava Spring | (China) Duan Xin | Harbin | Harbin ICE Sports Center | 50,000 | 4th |
| Changchun Yatai | (China) Chen Yang | Changchun | Changchun Stadium | 41,638 | 5th |
| Zhejiang Energy Greentown | (China) Zheng Xiong | Hangzhou | Huzhou Olympic Sports Centre | 40,000 | 6th |
| Inner Mongolia Zhongyou | (South Korea) Choi Jin-han | Hohhot | Hohhot City Stadium | 51,632 | 7th |
| Beijing BSU | (China) Su Maozhen | Beijing | Olympic Sports Centre | 36,228 | 8th |
| Shaanxi Chang'an Athletic | (South Korea) Kim Bong-gil | Xi'an | Weinan Sports Center Stadium | 32,000 | 9th |
| Meizhou Hakka | (Brazil) Marcelo Rospide | Wuhua | Huitang Stadium | 30,000 | 10th |
| Nantong Zhiyun | (China) Xie Hui | Rugao | Rugao Olympic Sports Center | 15,000 | 12th |
| Xinjiang Tianshan Leopard | (China) Polat Kutulk (caretaker) | Ürümqi | Xinjiang Sports Centre | 50,000 | 13th |
| Liaoning Shenyang Urban ^{P} | (China) Yu Ming | Shenyang | Shenyang Urban Construction University Stadium | 12,000 | CL2, 1st |
| Chengdu Better City ^{P} | (Spain) José Carlos Granero | Chengdu | Chengdu Longquanyi Football Stadium | 42,000 | CL2, 2nd |
| Taizhou Yuanda ^{P} | (China) Yin Tiesheng | Taizhou | Taixing Sports Center Stadium | 8,000 | CL2, 3rd |
| Suzhou Dongwu ^{P} | (England) Gary White | Suzhou | Suzhou Olympic Sports Centre | 45,000 | CL2, 4th |
| Jiangxi Liansheng ^{P} | (China) Huang Yong | Ruichang | Ruichang Sports Park Stadium | N/A | CL2, 6th |
| Sichuan Jiuniu ^{P} | (China) Li Yi | Chengdu | Chengdu Longquanyi Football Stadium | 27,000 | CL2, 8th |
| Kunshan F.C. ^{P} | (China) Gao Yao | Kunshan | Kunshan Sports Centre Stadium | 30,000 | CL2, 9th |

=== Clubs locations ===
Location of teams in 2020 China League One

=== Managerial changes ===
| Team | Outgoing manager | Manner of departure | Date of vacancy | Position in table | Incoming manager | Date of appointment |
|---|---|---|---|---|---|---|
| Changchun Yatai | (Serbia) Svetozar Šapurić | Sacked | 3 November 2019 | Pre-season | (Uzbekistan) Samvel Babayan | 2 December 2019 |
| Meizhou Hakka | (China) Zheng Xiaotian | Signed by Beijing Sinobo Guoan | 6 November 2019 | Pre-season | (Brazil) Marcelo Rospide | 20 December 2019 |
| Shaanxi Chang'an Athletic | (China) Wang Bo | Signed by Beijing Renhe | 10 November 2019 | Pre-season | (South Korea) Kim Bong-gil | 16 December 2019 |
| Guizhou Hengfeng | (China) Chen Mao | Mutual consent | 26 November 2019 | Pre-season | (China) Wang Xinxin | 26 November 2019 |
| Nantong Zhiyun | (England) Gary White | Mutual consent | 31 March 2020 | Pre-season | (China) Xie Hui | 31 March 2020 |
| Sichuan Jiuniu | (China) Wang Hongwei | Mutual consent | 18 May 2020 | Pre-season | (China) Li Yi | 22 July 2020 |
| Inner Mongolia Zhongyou | (China) Chen Yang | Mutual consent | 25 August 2020 | Pre-season | (South Korea) Choi Jin-han | 1 September 2020 |
| Changchun Yatai | (Uzbekistan) Samvel Babayan | Sacked | 5 October 2020 | Group C, 2nd | (China) Chen Yang | 5 October 2020 |
| Xinjiang Tianshan Leopard | (Spain) Fernando | Sacked | 10 October 2020 | Group C, 6th | (China) Polat Kutulk (caretaker) | 12 October 2020 |
| Guizhou Hengfeng | (China) Wang Xinxin | Mutual consent | 13 October 2020 | Group B, 5th | (China) Chen Mao | 13 October 2020 |
| Suzhou Dongwu | (China) Liu Junwei | Sacked | 18 October 2020 | Group A, 5th | (England) Gary White | 24 October 2020 |

== Foreign players ==
The policy of foreign players was changed. The number of foreign players clubs can register over the course of the season is limited to four and the number of foreign players allowed on each team at any given time is increased from three to four. A maximum of three foreign players can be registered for each match with a maximum of two can be fielded at any time during the match. In addition, each club can register a Hong Kong, Macau, or Taiwan player of Chinese descent (excluding goalkeepers), provided that he registered as a professional footballer in one of those three association for the first time, as a native player.

- Players name in **bold** indicates the player is registered during the mid-season transfer window.

| Team | Player 1 | Player 2 | Player 3 | Naturalized Players | Hong Kong/Macau/ Taiwan Players^{1} | Former players |
|---|---|---|---|---|---|---|
| Beijing BSU | (Nigeria) John Owoeri | | | | (Chinese Taipei) Wen Chih-hao | (Nigeria) Dominic Vinicius |
| Beijing Renhe | (Brazil) Tiago Leonço | | | | | (Australia) (Hong Kong) Daniel Wong |
| Changchun Yatai | (Brazil) Serginho | (Brazil) Lucas Souza | (Nigeria) Aaron Samuel | | (Chinese Taipei) Chen Po-liang | |
| Chengdu Better City | (Brazil) Naldinho | (Spain) Dani Quintana | (Serbia) Nikola Đurđić | | | |
| Guizhou Hengfeng | (Albania) Jahmir Hyka | (Croatia) Anton Maglica | **(Serbia) Stefan Mihajlović** | | | (Brazil) Sérgio Mota |
| Heilongjiang Lava Spring | **(Cameroon) Raphaël Messi Bouli** | **(Cameroon) Donovan Ewolo** | **(Martinique) Yoann Arquin** | | | |
| Inner Mongolia Zhongyou | (Brazil) Guto | (Senegal) André Senghor | | | **(Hong Kong) (Australia) Daniel Wong** | |
| Jiangxi Liansheng | **(Albania) Vasil Shkurti** | **(Brazil) Éder** | **(Turkey) Okan Aydın** | | (Hong Kong) Andy Russell | (Ivory Coast) Junior Tobi |
| Kunshan F.C. | (Brazil) Bruno Pires | (Cape Verde) Hildeberto Pereira | (Nigeria) Tunde Adeniji | (Peru) → (China) Xiao Taotao | | |
| Liaoning Shenyang Urban | (Republic of the Congo) Juvhel Tsoumou | (Uzbekistan) Islom Tukhtakhujaev | | | | (South Korea) Kim Sung-hwan |
| Meizhou Hakka | (Guinea) Lonsana Doumbouya | (Nigeria) Chisom Egbuchulam | | | (Hong Kong) Leung Nok Hang | (Brazil) Dori |
| Nantong Zhiyun | (Brazil) Mychell Chagas | (Portugal) João Silva | (Serbia) Mladen Kovačević | (Spain) → (China) David Wang | | |
| Shaanxi Chang'an Athletic | (Albania) Albi Alla | (Cameroon) Raoul Loé | **(Cameroon) Robert Tambe** | | (Chinese Taipei) Wang Chien-ming | (Nigeria) Kingsley Onuegbu |
| Sichuan Jiuniu | **(Brazil) Dori** | (Guinea) Mohamed Yattara | (Serbia) Nemanja Vidić | (Japan) → (China) Xia Dalong | | (France) Jules Iloki |
| Suzhou Dongwu | **(France) Jules Iloki** | **(Nigeria) Joseph Atule Junior** | (Nigeria) Chris Shimbayev | | | (Nigeria) Haruna Garba |
| Taizhou Yuanda | (Croatia) Marko Bašić | (Nigeria) Daniel Chima Chukwu | (Serbia) Zoran Tošić | | | |
| Xinjiang Tianshan Leopard | **(Burundi) Bienvenue Kanakimana** | **(Nigeria) Kingsley Onuegbu** | | | | |
| Zhejiang Energy Greentown | (Brazil) Rafael Martins | (South Africa) Dino Ndlovu | (Zimbabwe) Nyasha Mushekwi | | | |

- **^1** For Hong Kong, Macau, or Taiwanese players, if they are non-naturalized and were registered as professional footballers in Hong Kong's, Macau's, or Chinese Taipei's football association for the first time, they are recognized as native players. Otherwise they are recognized as foreign players.

== Regular season ==
=== Group A ===
==== Stadiums ====
- Chengdu Longquanyi Football Stadium
- Chengdu Wenjiang Football Base
- Shuangliu Sports Centre
- Dujiangyan Phoenix Stadium (Reserve)

==== League table ====
| Pos | Team | Pld | W | D | L | GF | GA | GD | Pts | Qualification or relegation |
|---|---|---|---|---|---|---|---|---|---|---|
| 1 | Chengdu Better City (H) | 10 | 8 | 1 | 1 | 15 | 7 | +8 | 25 | Qualification for Promotion stage and qualification to the 2020 Chinese FA Cup |
| 2 | Taizhou Yuanda | 10 | 5 | 3 | 2 | 13 | 8 | +5 | 18 | Qualification for Promotion stage and qualification to the 2020 Chinese FA Cup |
| 3 | Beijing Renhe | 10 | 5 | 1 | 4 | 14 | 12 | +2 | 16 | Qualification for Relegation stage Group E |
| 4 | Beijing BSU | 10 | 3 | 2 | 5 | 14 | 14 | 0 | 11 | Qualification for Relegation stage Group E |
| 5 | Suzhou Dongwu | 10 | 2 | 1 | 7 | 7 | 15 | −8 | 7 (Note: Head-to-head results: Suzhou Dongwu 0–0 Inner Mongolia Zhongyou, Inner Mongolia Zhongyou 0–2 Suzhou Dongwu) | Qualification for Relegation stage Group F |
| 6 | Inner Mongolia Zhongyou | 10 | 1 | 4 | 5 | 5 | 12 | −7 | 7 | Qualification for Relegation stage Group F |

Rules for classification:
- During season: 1) Points; 2) Goal difference; 3) Goals scored.
- After season: 1) Points; 2) Head-to-head points; 3) Head-to-head goal difference; 4) Head-to-head goals scored; 5) Scores of the weight ratio of the reserve league and youth leagues.
  (H) Hosts
  Notes:

==== Results ====
| Home \ Away | BSU | BJR | CDB | IMZ | SZD | TZY |
|---|---|---|---|---|---|---|
| Beijing BSU | — | 0–1 | 0–1 | 1–0 | 4–0 | 0–2 |
| Beijing Renhe | 3–2 | — | 3–2 | 1–2 | 1–0 | 1–2 |
| Chengdu Better City | 1–0 | 3–2 | — | 1–0 | 2–1 | 0–0 |
| Inner Mongolia Zhongyou | 2–2 | 0–0 | 0–2 | — | 0–2 | 1–1 |
| Suzhou Dongwu | 2–3 | 0–2 | 0–1 | 0–0 | — | 2–1 |
| Taizhou Yuanda | 2–2 | 1–0 | 1–2 | 2–0 | 1–0 | — |

Legend: Blue = home team win; Yellow = draw; Red = away team win.
For upcoming matches, an "a" indicates there is an article about the rivalry between the two participants.

==== Positions by round ====
To maintain chronological order, postponed matches are not included in the round for which they were originally scheduled but are instead added to the round immediately following their actual play date. For example, if a match is scheduled for round 7, but then played between rounds 8 and 9, it will be added to the standings for round 8.

| Team ╲ Round | 1 | 2 | 3 | 4 | 5 | 6 | 7 | 8 | 9 | 10 |
|---|---|---|---|---|---|---|---|---|---|---|
| Chengdu Better City | 1 | 1 | 1 | 1 | 1 | 1 | 1 | 1 | 1 | 1 |
| Taizhou Yuanda | 3 | 2 | 3 | 2 | 2 | 2 | 2 | 3 | 3 | 2 |
| Beijing Renhe | 4 | 3 | 2 | 3 | 3 | 3 | 3 | 2 | 2 | 3 |
| Beijing BSU | 2 | 4 | 4 | 5 | 4 | 4 | 4 | 5 | 4 | 4 |
| Suzhou Dongwu | 6 | 6 | 6 | 6 | 6 | 6 | 6 | 4 | 5 | 5 |
| Inner Mongolia Zhongyou | 5 | 5 | 5 | 4 | 5 | 5 | 5 | 6 | 6 | 6 |

| Qualification to Promotion stage |
| Qualification to Relegation stage |

==== Results by match played ====
| Team ╲ Round | 1 | 2 | 3 | 4 | 5 | 6 | 7 | 8 | 9 | 10 |
|---|---|---|---|---|---|---|---|---|---|---|
| Beijing BSU | W | L | L | L | W | D | L | L | D | W |
| Beijing Renhe | L | W | W | L | L | W | W | W | D | L |
| Chengdu Better City | W | W | W | W | W | L | W | D | W | W |
| Inner Mongolia Zhongyou | L | D | D | W | L | D | L | L | D | L |
| Suzhou Dongwu | L | L | D | L | L | W | L | W | L | L |
| Taizhou Yuanda | W | D | L | W | W | L | W | D | D | W |

W = Win; D = Draw; L = Loss

=== Group B ===
==== Stadiums ====
- Hengbei Football Town Field 9
- Wuhua County Olympic Sports Centre
- Wuhua County Stadium

==== League table ====
| Pos | Team | Pld | W | D | L | GF | GA | GD | Pts | Qualification or relegation |
|---|---|---|---|---|---|---|---|---|---|---|
| 1 | Meizhou Hakka (H) | 10 | 6 | 4 | 0 | 20 | 9 | +11 | 22 | Qualification for Promotion stage and qualification to the 2020 Chinese FA Cup |
| 2 | Zhejiang Energy Greentown | 10 | 5 | 4 | 1 | 19 | 8 | +11 | 19 | Qualification for Promotion stage and qualification to the 2020 Chinese FA Cup |
| 3 | Shaanxi Chang'an Athletic | 10 | 4 | 3 | 3 | 11 | 10 | +1 | 15 | Qualification for Relegation stage Group F |
| 4 | Guizhou Hengfeng | 10 | 2 | 4 | 4 | 9 | 12 | −3 | 10 | Qualification for Relegation stage Group E |
| 5 | Liaoning Shenyang Urban | 10 | 2 | 3 | 5 | 9 | 14 | −5 | 9 | Qualification for Relegation stage Group E |
| 6 | Jiangxi Liansheng | 10 | 1 | 2 | 7 | 6 | 21 | −15 | 5 | Qualification for Relegation stage Group F |

Rules for classification:
- During season: 1) Points; 2) Goal difference; 3) Goals scored.
- After season: 1) Points; 2) Head-to-head points; 3) Head-to-head goal difference; 4) Head-to-head goals scored; 5) Scores of the weight ratio of the reserve league and youth leagues.
  (H) Hosts

==== Results ====
| Home \ Away | GZH | JXL | LSU | MZK | SCA | ZJG |
|---|---|---|---|---|---|---|
| Guizhou Hengfeng | — | 1–1 | 0–2 | 0–1 | 1–0 | 1–1 |
| Jiangxi Liansheng | 1–3 | — | 0–2 | 0–4 | 0–1 | 0–2 |
| Liaoning Shenyang Urban | 1–1 | 0–1 | — | 2–2 | 1–1 | 1–5 |
| Meizhou Hakka | 0–0 | 3–2 | 2–0 | — | 3–2 | 2–2 |
| Shaanxi Chang'an Athletic | 3–1 | 1–1 | 1–0 | 0–2 | — | 1–1 |
| Zhejiang Energy Greentown | 2–1 | 4–0 | 1–0 | 1–1 | 0–1 | — |

Legend: Blue = home team win; Yellow = draw; Red = away team win.
For upcoming matches, an "a" indicates there is an article about the rivalry between the two participants.

==== Positions by round ====
To preserve chronological evolvements, any postponed matches are not included to the round at which they were originally scheduled, but added to the full round they were played immediately afterwards. For example, if a match is scheduled for round 7, but then played between rounds 8 and 9, it will be added to the standings for round 8.

| Team ╲ Round | 1 | 2 | 3 | 4 | 5 | 6 | 7 | 8 | 9 | 10 |
|---|---|---|---|---|---|---|---|---|---|---|
| Meizhou Hakka | 1 | 2 | 1 | 1 | 1 | 1 | 1 | 1 | 1 | 1 |
| Zhejiang Energy Greentown | 5 | 1 | 2 | 2 | 2 | 2 | 2 | 2 | 2 | 2 |
| Shaanxi Chang'an Athletic | 4 | 3 | 4 | 6 | 6 | 4 | 3 | 3 | 3 | 3 |
| Guizhou Hengfeng | 2 | 4 | 5 | 3 | 3 | 3 | 4 | 4 | 5 | 4 |
| Liaoning Shenyang Urban | 6 | 5 | 3 | 4 | 4 | 5 | 5 | 5 | 4 | 5 |
| Jiangxi Liansheng | 3 | 6 | 6 | 5 | 5 | 6 | 6 | 6 | 6 | 6 |

| Qualification to Promotion stage |
| Qualification to Relegation stage |

==== Results by match played ====
| Team ╲ Round | 1 | 2 | 3 | 4 | 5 | 6 | 7 | 8 | 9 | 10 |
|---|---|---|---|---|---|---|---|---|---|---|
| Guizhou Hengfeng | D | D | L | W | W | L | L | D | L | D |
| Jiangxi Liansheng | D | L | L | W | L | L | L | L | L | D |
| Liaoning Shenyang Urban | L | D | W | L | L | D | L | D | W | L |
| Meizhou Hakka | W | D | W | D | W | D | W | W | D | W |
| Shaanxi Chang'an Athletic | D | D | D | L | L | W | W | W | W | L |
| Zhejiang Energy Greentown | D | W | D | D | W | W | W | L | D | W |

W = Win; D = Draw; L = Loss

=== Group C ===
==== Stadiums ====
- Changzhou Institute of Technology Football Field
- Changzhou Olympic Sports Centre
- Jiangyin Stadium

==== League table ====
| Pos | Team | Pld | W | D | L | GF | GA | GD | Pts | Qualification or relegation |
|---|---|---|---|---|---|---|---|---|---|---|
| 1 | Changchun Yatai | 10 | 6 | 3 | 1 | 20 | 7 | +13 | 21 | Qualification for Promotion stage and qualification to the 2020 Chinese FA Cup |
| 2 | Kunshan F.C. (H) | 10 | 5 | 3 | 2 | 10 | 7 | +3 | 18 | Qualification for Promotion stage and qualification to the 2020 Chinese FA Cup |
| 3 | Nantong Zhiyun | 10 | 4 | 4 | 2 | 9 | 9 | 0 | 16 | Qualification for Relegation stage Group F |
| 4 | Heilongjiang Lava Spring | 10 | 1 | 7 | 2 | 5 | 6 | −1 | 10 | Qualification for Relegation stage Group F |
| 5 | Sichuan Jiuniu | 10 | 1 | 6 | 3 | 8 | 12 | −4 | 9 | Qualification for Relegation stage Group E |
| 6 | Xinjiang Tianshan Leopard | 10 | 0 | 3 | 7 | 5 | 16 | −11 | 3 | Qualification for Relegation stage Group E |

Rules for classification:
- During season: 1) Points; 2) Goal difference; 3) Goals scored.
- After season: 1) Points; 2) Head-to-head points; 3) Head-to-head goal difference; 4) Head-to-head goals scored; 5) Scores of the weight ratio of the reserve league and youth leagues.
  (H) Hosts

==== Results ====
| Home \ Away | CC | HLJ | KS | NTZ | SCJ | XJT |
|---|---|---|---|---|---|---|
| Changchun Yatai | — | 2–1 | 0–1 | 4–0 | 1–1 | 4–1 |
| Heilongjiang Lava Spring | 1–1 | — | 0–0 | 0–1 | 1–1 | 0–0 |
| Kunshan F.C. | 1–3 | 0–1 | — | 0–0 | 1–1 | 3–2 |
| Nantong Zhiyun | 0–0 | 1–1 | 0–1 | — | 1–1 | 2–0 |
| Sichuan Jiuniu | 1–3 | 0–0 | 0–2 | 1–2 | — | 0–0 |
| Xinjiang Tianshan Leopard | 0–2 | 0–0 | 0–1 | 1–2 | 1–2 | — |

Legend: Blue = home team win; Yellow = draw; Red = away team win.
For upcoming matches, an "a" indicates there is an article about the rivalry between the two participants.

==== Positions by round ====
To preserve chronological evolvements, any postponed matches are not included to the round at which they were originally scheduled, but added to the full round they were played immediately afterwards. For example, if a match is scheduled for round 7, but then played between rounds 8 and 9, it will be added to the standings for round 8.

| Team ╲ Round | 1 | 2 | 3 | 4 | 5 | 6 | 7 | 8 | 9 | 10 |
|---|---|---|---|---|---|---|---|---|---|---|
| Changchun Yatai | 3 | 1 | 1 | 2 | 2 | 3 | 2 | 1 | 1 | 1 |
| Kunshan F.C. | 1 | 2 | 2 | 1 | 1 | 1 | 1 | 2 | 2 | 2 |
| Nantong Zhiyun | 2 | 3 | 3 | 3 | 3 | 2 | 3 | 3 | 3 | 3 |
| Heilongjiang Lava Spring | 4 | 4 | 4 | 4 | 4 | 4 | 4 | 4 | 4 | 4 |
| Sichuan Jiuniu | 5 | 5 | 5 | 5 | 5 | 5 | 5 | 5 | 5 | 5 |
| Xinjiang Tianshan Leopard | 6 | 6 | 6 | 6 | 6 | 6 | 6 | 6 | 6 | 6 |

| Qualification to Promotion stage |
| Qualification to Relegation stage |

==== Results by match played ====
| Team ╲ Round | 1 | 2 | 3 | 4 | 5 | 6 | 7 | 8 | 9 | 10 |
|---|---|---|---|---|---|---|---|---|---|---|
| Changchun Yatai | W | W | D | L | W | D | W | W | W | D |
| Heilongjiang Lava Spring | L | D | D | D | L | D | D | W | D | D |
| Kunshan F.C. | W | D | D | W | W | D | W | L | L | W |
| Nantong Zhiyun | W | D | D | D | W | W | L | L | W | D |
| Sichuan Jiuniu | L | D | D | D | L | D | D | W | L | D |
| Xinjiang Tianshan Leopard | L | L | D | D | L | L | L | L | D | L |

W = Win; D = Draw; L = Loss

== Promotion stage ==
=== League table ===
| Pos | Team | Pld | W | D | L | GF | GA | GD | Pts | Qualification or relegation |
|---|---|---|---|---|---|---|---|---|---|---|
| 1 | Changchun Yatai (C, P) | 5 | 4 | 1 | 0 | 8 | 0 | +8 | 13 | Promotion to the Chinese Super League |
| 2 | Zhejiang Energy Greentown | 5 | 3 | 1 | 1 | 8 | 5 | +3 | 10 | Qualification to the promotion play-offs |
| 3 | Kunshan F.C. | 5 | 2 | 1 | 2 | 4 | 5 | −1 | 7 | |
| 4 | Chengdu Better City | 5 | 2 | 1 | 2 | 5 | 7 | −2 | 7 | |
| 5 | Meizhou Hakka | 5 | 2 | 0 | 3 | 7 | 7 | 0 | 6 | |
| 6 | Taizhou Yuanda (Note: Taizhou Yuanda was dissolved after 2020 season.) (D) | 5 | 0 | 0 | 5 | 3 | 11 | −8 | 0 | Disbanded after season |

Rules for classification:
- During season: 1) Points; 2) Goal difference; 3) Goals scored.
- After season: 1) Points; 2) Head-to-head points; 3) Head-to-head goal difference; 4) Head-to-head goals scored; 5) Scores of the weight ratio of the reserve league and youth leagues.
  (C) Champions; (D) Disqualified; (P) Promoted
  Notes:

=== Results ===
| Home \ Away | CC | CDB | KS | MZH | TZY | ZJG |
|---|---|---|---|---|---|---|
| Changchun Yatai | | | 2–0 | 1–0 | | 0–0 |
| Chengdu Better City | 0–3 | | | 2–1 | 2–1 | |
| Kunshan F.C. | | 1–1 | | 1–0 | | |
| Meizhou Hakka | | | | | 2–1 | 4–2 |
| Taizhou Yuanda | 0–2 | | 0–2 | | | 1–3 |
| Zhejiang Energy Greentown | | 1–0 | 2–0 | | | |

Legend: Blue = home team win; Yellow = draw; Red = away team win.
For upcoming matches, an "a" indicates there is an article about the rivalry between the two participants.

=== Positions by round ===
To preserve chronological evolvements, any postponed matches are not included to the round at which they were originally scheduled, but added to the full round they were played immediately afterwards. For example, if a match is scheduled for round 7, but then played between rounds 8 and 9, it will be added to the standings for round 8.

| Team ╲ Round | 1 | 2 | 3 | 4 | 5 |
|---|---|---|---|---|---|
| Changchun Yatai | 3 | 1 | 1 | 1 | 1 |
| Zhejiang Energy Greentown | 1 | 4 | 3 | 3 | 2 |
| Kunshan F.C. | 6 | 5 | 4 | 5 | 3 |
| Chengdu Better City | 2 | 2 | 2 | 2 | 4 |
| Meizhou Hakka | 5 | 3 | 5 | 4 | 5 |
| Taizhou Yuanda | 4 | 6 | 6 | 6 | 6 |

| Leader and promotion to the Chinese Super League |
| Qualification to the promotion play-offs |

=== Results by match played ===
| Team ╲ Round | 1 | 2 | 3 | 4 | 5 |
|---|---|---|---|---|---|
| Changchun Yatai | W | W | D | W | W |
| Chengdu Better City | W | D | W | L | L |
| Kunshan F.C. | L | D | W | L | W |
| Meizhou Hakka | L | W | L | W | L |
| Taizhou Yuanda | L | L | L | L | L |
| Zhejiang Energy Greentown | W | L | D | W | W |

W = Win; D = Draw; L = Loss

== Relegation stage ==
=== Group E ===
==== League table ====
| Pos | Team | Pld | W | D | L | GF | GA | GD | Pts | Qualification or relegation |
|---|---|---|---|---|---|---|---|---|---|---|
| 1 | Guizhou Hengfeng | 5 | 4 | 0 | 1 | 11 | 4 | +7 | 12 | Qualification to the 2020 Chinese FA Cup |
| 2 | Beijing BSU | 5 | 2 | 2 | 1 | 7 | 4 | +3 | 8 | |
| 3 | Sichuan Jiuniu | 5 | 2 | 2 | 1 | 6 | 5 | +1 | 8 | |
| 4 | Liaoning Shenyang Urban | 5 | 1 | 2 | 2 | 5 | 8 | −3 | 5 | |
| 5 | Beijing Renhe (Note: Beijing Renhe was dissolved after 2020 season.) (R, D, R) | 5 | 1 | 1 | 3 | 6 | 12 | −6 | 4 | Qualification to the relegation play-offs and disbanded after season |
| 6 | Xinjiang Tianshan Leopard (O) | 5 | 0 | 3 | 2 | 5 | 7 | −2 | 3 | Qualification to the relegation play-offs |

Rules for classification:
- During season: 1) Points; 2) Goal difference; 3) Goals scored.
- After season: 1) Points; 2) Head-to-head points; 3) Head-to-head goal difference; 4) Head-to-head goals scored; 5) Scores of the weight ratio of the reserve league and youth leagues.
  (D) Disqualified; (O) Play-off winners; (R) Relegated
  Notes:

==== Results ====
| Home \ Away | BSU | BJR | GZH | LSU | SCJ | XJT |
|---|---|---|---|---|---|---|
| Beijing BSU | | 3–0 | | 1–0 | | 1–1 |
| Beijing Renhe | | | | 2–3 | 3–2 | |
| Guizhou Hengfeng | 2–1 | 3–0 | | | | |
| Liaoning Shenyang Urban | | | 0–3 | | 0–0 | 2–2 |
| Sichuan Jiuniu | 1–1 | | 2–1 | | | |
| Xinjiang Tianshan Leopard | | 1–1 | 1–2 | | 0–1 | |

Legend: Blue = home team win; Yellow = draw; Red = away team win.
For upcoming matches, an "a" indicates there is an article about the rivalry between the two participants.

==== Positions by round ====
To preserve chronological evolvements, any postponed matches are not included to the round at which they were originally scheduled, but added to the full round they were played immediately afterwards. For example, if a match is scheduled for round 7, but then played between rounds 8 and 9, it will be added to the standings for round 8.

| Team ╲ Round | 1 | 2 | 3 | 4 | 5 |
|---|---|---|---|---|---|
| Guizhou Hengfeng | 2 | 3 | 2 | 1 | 1 |
| Beijing BSU | 1 | 2 | 3 | 2 | 2 |
| Sichuan Jiuniu | 3 | 1 | 1 | 3 | 3 |
| Liaoning Shenyang Urban | 6 | 4 | 4 | 5 | 4 |
| Beijing Renhe | 5 | 6 | 6 | 4 | 5 |
| Xinjiang Tianshan Leopard | 4 | 5 | 5 | 6 | 6 |

| Qualification to the relegation play-offs |

==== Results by match played ====
| Team ╲ Round | 1 | 2 | 3 | 4 | 5 |
|---|---|---|---|---|---|
| Beijing BSU | W | D | L | W | D |
| Beijing Renhe | L | L | D | W | L |
| Guizhou Hengfeng | W | L | W | W | W |
| Liaoning Shenyang Urban | L | W | D | L | D |
| Sichuan Jiuniu | W | W | D | L | D |
| Xinjiang Tianshan Leopard | L | D | D | L | D |

W = Win; D = Draw; L = Loss

=== Group F ===
==== League table ====
| Pos | Team | Pld | W | D | L | GF | GA | GD | Pts | Qualification or relegation |
|---|---|---|---|---|---|---|---|---|---|---|
| 1 | Suzhou Dongwu | 5 | 2 | 2 | 1 | 5 | 5 | 0 | 8 | Qualification to the 2020 Chinese FA Cup |
| 2 | Shaanxi Chang'an Athletic | 5 | 1 | 3 | 1 | 3 | 3 | 0 | 6 (Note: Head-to-head results: Shaanxi Chang'an Athletic 1–0 Nantong Zhiyun; Inner Mongolia Zhongyou 1–1 Shaanxi Chang'an Athletic; Nantong Zhiyun 2–1 Inner Mongolia Zhongyou.) | |
| 3 | Nantong Zhiyun | 5 | 1 | 3 | 1 | 7 | 7 | 0 | 6 | |
| 4 | Inner Mongolia Zhongyou (Note: Inner Mongolia Zhongyou was dissolved after 2020 season.) (D, R) | 5 | 1 | 3 | 1 | 8 | 7 | +1 | 6 | Disbanded after season |
| 5 | Heilongjiang Lava Spring (O) | 5 | 0 | 5 | 0 | 3 | 3 | 0 | 5 | Qualification to the relegation play-offs |
| 6 | Jiangxi Liansheng (O) | 5 | 0 | 4 | 1 | 8 | 9 | −1 | 4 | Qualification to the relegation play-offs |

Rules for classification:
- During season: 1) Points; 2) Goal difference; 3) Goals scored.
- After season: 1) Points; 2) Head-to-head points; 3) Head-to-head goal difference; 4) Head-to-head goals scored; 5) Scores of the weight ratio of the reserve league and youth leagues.
  (D) Disqualified; (O) Play-off winners; (R) Relegated
  Notes:

==== Results ====
| Home \ Away | HLJ | IMZ | JXL | NTZ | SCA | SZD |
|---|---|---|---|---|---|---|
| Heilongjiang Lava Spring | | | | 1–1 | 0–0 | 0–0 |
| Inner Mongolia Zhongyou | 1–1 | | | | 1–1 | |
| Jiangxi Liansheng | 1–1 | 2–2 | | | | |
| Nantong Zhiyun | | 2–1 | 3–3 | | | 1–1 |
| Shaanxi Chang'an Athletic | | | 1–1 | 1–0 | | |
| Suzhou Dongwu | | 1–3 | 2–1 | | 1–0 | |

Legend: Blue = home team win; Yellow = draw; Red = away team win.
For upcoming matches, an "a" indicates there is an article about the rivalry between the two participants.

==== Positions by round ====
To preserve chronological evolvements, any postponed matches are not included to the round at which they were originally scheduled, but added to the full round they were played immediately afterwards. For example, if a match is scheduled for round 7, but then played between rounds 8 and 9, it will be added to the standings for round 8.

| Team ╲ Round | 1 | 2 | 3 | 4 | 5 |
|---|---|---|---|---|---|
| Suzhou Dongwu | 6 | 6 | 3 | 4 | 1 |
| Shaanxi Chang'an Athletic | 5 | 5 | 5 | 1 | 2 |
| Nantong Zhiyun | 4 | 4 | 1 | 3 | 3 |
| Inner Mongolia Zhongyou | 1 | 1 | 2 | 2 | 4 |
| Heilongjiang Lava Spring | 2 | 2 | 4 | 5 | 5 |
| Jiangxi Liansheng | 3 | 3 | 6 | 6 | 6 |

| Qualification to the relegation play-offs |

==== Results by match played ====
| Team ╲ Round | 1 | 2 | 3 | 4 | 5 |
|---|---|---|---|---|---|
| Heilongjiang Lava Spring | D | D | D | D | D |
| Inner Mongolia Zhongyou | W | D | L | D | D |
| Jiangxi Liansheng | D | D | L | D | D |
| Nantong Zhiyun | D | D | W | L | D |
| Shaanxi Chang'an Athletic | D | D | D | W | L |
| Suzhou Dongwu | L | D | W | D | W |

W = Win; D = Draw; L = Loss

== Relegation play-offs ==
=== Overview ===
| Team 1 | Agg. | Team 2 | 1st leg | 2nd leg |
|---|---|---|---|---|
| Xinjiang Tianshan Leopard | 4–4 (3–5 p) | Heilongjiang Lava Spring | 3–2 | 1–2 (a.e.t.) |
| Jiangxi Liansheng | 3–2 | Beijing Renhe | 2–1 | 1–1 |

=== First leg ===
17 November 2020
15:30 UTC+8

| Xinjiang Tianshan Leopard | 3–2 | Heilongjiang Lava Spring |
|---|---|---|
| Onuegbu 21'; Danyar Musajan 43'; Kanakimana 76' | | Ewolo 46'; Li Shuai 89' |

Suzhou Sports Center, Suzhou
Referee: Niu Minghui

18 November 2020
15:30 UTC+8

| Jiangxi Liansheng | 2–1 | Beijing Renhe |
|---|---|---|
| Éder 49', 53' | | Liu Xinyu 90' |

Suzhou Sports Center, Suzhou
Referee: Xu Qiangqiang

=== Second leg ===
20 November 2020
15:30 UTC+8

| Heilongjiang Lava Spring | 2–1 (a.e.t.) | Xinjiang Tianshan Leopard |
|---|---|---|
| Mao Kaiyu 26'; Li Shuai 65' | | Onuegbu 1' |
Penalties
| Cao Kang (penalty scored); Chen Liming (penalty scored); Mao Kaiyu (penalty scored); Yu Xiang (penalty scored); Li Shuai (penalty scored) | 5–3 | (penalty scored) Xiang Jiachi; (penalty scored) Ilyas Ilhar; (penalty missed) Elbug Chagtsel; (penalty scored) Mirdan Ablikim |

Suzhou Sports Center, Suzhou
Referee: Wan Tao

4–4 on aggregate. Heilongjiang Lava Spring won 5–3 on penalties.

21 November 2020
15:30 UTC+8

| Beijing Renhe | 1–1 | Jiangxi Liansheng |
|---|---|---|
| Liu Xinyu 15' | | Éder 24' |

Suzhou Sports Center, Suzhou
Referee: Li Haixin

Jiangxi Liansheng won 3–2 on aggregate.

== Statistics ==
=== Top scorers ===
As of 21 November 2020

| Rank | Player | Club | Goals |
|---|---|---|---|
| 1 | (China) Tan Long | Changchun Yatai | 11 |
| 2 | (Guinea) Lonsana Doumbouya | Meizhou Hakka | 8 |
| 2 | (Brazil) Tiago Leonço | Beijing Renhe | 8 |
| 4 | (China) Shang Yin | Jiangxi Liansheng | 7 |
| 4 | (Zimbabwe) Nyasha Mushekwi | Zhejiang Energy Greentown | 7 |
| 6 | (Brazil) Rafael Martins | Zhejiang Energy Greentown | 6 |
| 6 | (China) Yan Xiangchuang | Beijing BSU | 6 |
| 6 | (South Africa) Dino Ndlovu | Zhejiang Energy Greentown | 6 |
| 9 | (Brazil) Guto | Inner Mongolia Zhongyou | 5 |
| 9 | (Serbia) Mladen Kovačević | Nantong Zhiyun | 5 |
| 9 | (Croatia) Anton Maglica | Guizhou Hengfeng | 5 |
| 9 | (China) Xu Junmin | Nantong Zhiyun | 5 |

=== Hat-tricks ===
| Player | For | Against | Result | Date | Ref |
|---|---|---|---|---|---|
| (China) Tan Long | Changchun Yatai | Xinjiang Tianshan Leopard | 4–1 (H) | 3 October 2020 | |
| (China) Tan Long | Changchun Yatai | Nantong Zhiyun | 4–0 (H) | 8 October 2020 | |
