= List of Chinese football transfers mid-season 2020 =

This is a list of Chinese football transfers for the 2020 season mid-season transfer window.

== Super League ==
=== Beijing Sinobo Guoan ===
In:

No.	Pos.	Nation	Player
-	DF	BIH	Toni Šunjić (from (Russia) Dynamo Moscow)

Out:

No.	Pos.	Nation	Player
-	DF	BIH	Toni Šunjić (loan to Henan Jianye)

=== Chongqing Dangdai Lifan ===
In:

No.	Pos.	Nation	Player

Out:

No.	Pos.	Nation	Player
9	MF	POL	Adrian Mierzejewski (loan to Guangzhou R&F)
21	MF	CHN	Hu Xingyu (loan to Suzhou Dongwu)
59	DF	CHN	Huang Lei (loan to Suzhou Dongwu)

=== Dalian Professional ===
In:

No.	Pos.	Nation	Player
12	MF	BRA	Jailson Siqueira (from (Turkey) Fenerbahçe)
37	MF	CHN	Yang Haoyu (loan from Hubei Chufeng Heli)
-	FW	BEL	Yannick Carrasco (loan return from (Spain) Atlético Madrid)

Out:

No.	Pos.	Nation	Player
-	FW	BEL	Yannick Carrasco (to (Spain) Atlético Madrid)

=== Guangzhou Evergrande Taobao ===
In:

No.	Pos.	Nation	Player

Out:

No.	Pos.	Nation	Player

=== Guangzhou R&F ===
In:

No.	Pos.	Nation	Player
6	MF	POL	Adrian Mierzejewski (loan from Chongqing Dangdai Lifan)
9	FW	NED	Richairo Zivkovic (loan from Changchun Yatai)
29	FW	CHN	Song Wenjie (from Shandong Luneng Taishan)

Out:

No.	Pos.	Nation	Player
7	FW	ISR	Eran Zahavi (to (Netherlands) PSV)
10	FW	ISR	Dia Saba (to (United Arab Emirates) Al-Nasr)

=== Hebei China Fortune ===
In:

No.	Pos.	Nation	Player
18	MF	CHN	Li Hao (from Yanbian Beiguo)

Out:

No.	Pos.	Nation	Player
9	FW	CHN	Dong Xuesheng (loan to Wuhan Zall)
14	MF	CHN	Feng Gang (loan to Zhejiang Energy Greentown)
42	GK	CHN	Pang Jiajun (to Inner Mongolia Zhongyou)
-	FW	MAR	Ayoub El Kaabi (Released)
-	MF	CHN	Li Haoran (to Inner Mongolia Zhongyou)

=== Henan Jianye ===
In:

No.	Pos.	Nation	Player
23	DF	BIH	Toni Šunjić (loan from Beijing Sinobo Guoan)

Out:

No.	Pos.	Nation	Player

=== Jiangsu Suning ===
In:

No.	Pos.	Nation	Player

Out:

No.	Pos.	Nation	Player

=== Qingdao Huanghai ===
In:

No.	Pos.	Nation	Player
24	FW	CRO	Dejan Radonjić (from (Russia) Krylia Sovetov)
40	MF	SVN	Denis Popović (from (Russia) Krylia Sovetov)

Out:

No.	Pos.	Nation	Player
9	FW	BRA	Cléo (Released)

=== Shandong Luneng Taishan ===
In:

No.	Pos.	Nation	Player
-	MF	POR	Pedro Delgado (loan return from (Portugal) Aves)

Out:

No.	Pos.	Nation	Player
8	MF	CHN	Yao Junsheng (loan to Zhejiang Energy Greentown)
19	FW	CHN	Song Wenjie (to Guangzhou R&F)
29	MF	CHN	Liu Chaoyang (loan to Shijiazhuang Ever Bright)
31	DF	CHN	Zhao Jianfei (loan to Shijiazhuang Ever Bright)

=== Shanghai Greenland Shenhua ===
In:

No.	Pos.	Nation	Player
15	FW	ECU	Fidel Martínez (from (Ecuador) Barcelona)
31	MF	ECU	Miller Bolaños (from (Mexico) Tijuana)

Out:

No.	Pos.	Nation	Player
4	DF	CHN	Jiang Shenglong (loan to Tianjin TEDA)
17	FW	NGA	Obafemi Martins (to Wuhan Zall)

=== Shanghai SIPG ===
In:

No.	Pos.	Nation	Player
19	MF	AUS	Aaron Mooy (from (England) Brighton & Hove Albion)

Out:

No.	Pos.	Nation	Player
25	MF	UZB	Odil Ahmedov (loan to Tianjin TEDA)

=== Shenzhen F.C. ===
In:

No.	Pos.	Nation	Player
35	DF	IRN	Morteza Pouraliganji (from (Qatar) Al-Arabi)
-	FW	POR	Dyego Sousa (loan return from (Portugal) Benfica)

Out:

No.	Pos.	Nation	Player
31	MF	SUI	Blerim Džemaili (Released)
57	MF	CHN	Xu Yue (loan to Jiangxi Liansheng)
59	DF	CHN	Huang Ruifeng (loan to Changchun Yatai)
-	MF	CHN	Li Jinqing (loan to (Spain) Villarrobledo)
-	FW	POR	Dyego Sousa (loan to (Portugal) Famalicão)

=== Shijiazhuang Ever Bright ===
In:

No.	Pos.	Nation	Player
5	DF	CHN	Zhao Jianfei (loan from Shandong Luneng Taishan)
25	MF	CHN	Liu Chaoyang (loan from Shandong Luneng Taishan)

Out:

No.	Pos.	Nation	Player

=== Tianjin TEDA ===
In:

No.	Pos.	Nation	Player
9	FW	BRA	Sandro Lima (from (Brazil) Grêmio Anápolis)
18	FW	BRA	Francisco Soares (from (Portugal) Porto)
25	MF	UZB	Odil Ahmedov (loan from Shanghai SIPG)
60	DF	CHN	Jiang Shenglong (loan from Shanghai Greenland Shenhua)

Out:

No.	Pos.	Nation	Player

=== Wuhan Zall ===
In:

No.	Pos.	Nation	Player
31	FW	CHN	Dong Xuesheng (loan from Hebei China Fortune)
32	FW	NGA	Obafemi Martins (from Shanghai Greenland Shenhua)

Out:

No.	Pos.	Nation	Player

== League One ==
=== Beijing BSU ===
In:

No.	Pos.	Nation	Player

Out:

No.	Pos.	Nation	Player

=== Beijing Renhe ===
In:

No.	Pos.	Nation	Player
-	FW	KEN	Ayub Masika (loan return from (England) Reading)

Out:

No.	Pos.	Nation	Player
20	FW	AUS	Daniel Wong (loan to Inner Mongolia Zhongyou)

=== Changchun Yatai ===
In:

No.	Pos.	Nation	Player
56	DF	CHN	Huang Ruifeng (loan from Shenzhen F.C.)
-	FW	NED	Richairo Zivkovic (loan return from (England) Sheffield United)

Out:

No.	Pos.	Nation	Player
6	DF	CHN	Li Xiaoming (loan to Suzhou Dongwu)
-	FW	NED	Richairo Zivkovic (loan to Guangzhou R&F)

=== Chengdu Better City ===
In:

No.	Pos.	Nation	Player

Out:

No.	Pos.	Nation	Player

=== Guizhou Hengfeng ===
In:

No.	Pos.	Nation	Player

Out:

No.	Pos.	Nation	Player

=== Heilongjiang Lava Spring ===
In:

No.	Pos.	Nation	Player
27	FW	CMR	Donovan Ewolo (loan from (Czech Republic) MFK Vyškov)
39	FW	CMR	Raphaël Messi Bouli (from (India) Kerala Blasters)

Out:

No.	Pos.	Nation	Player

=== Inner Mongolia Zhongyou ===
In:

No.	Pos.	Nation	Player
9	FW	AUS	Daniel Wong (loan from Beijing Renhe)
13	MF	CHN	Li Haoran (from Hebei China Fortune)
39	GK	CHN	Pang Jiajun (from Hebei China Fortune)

Out:

No.	Pos.	Nation	Player

=== Jiangxi Liansheng ===
In:

No.	Pos.	Nation	Player
15	MF	CHN	Wang Pan (loan from Meizhou Hakka)
23	FW	BRA	Éder (from (South Korea) Jeju United)
32	FW	ALB	Vasil Shkurti (from (Albania) FK Kukësi)
41	MF	CHN	Xu Yue (loan from Shenzhen F.C.)

Out:

No.	Pos.	Nation	Player

=== Kunshan F.C. ===
In:

No.	Pos.	Nation	Player
15	FW	CHN	Sun Zhaoliang (Free Agent)

Out:

No.	Pos.	Nation	Player

=== Liaoning Shenyang Urban ===
In:

No.	Pos.	Nation	Player
32	MF	CHN	Shen Haodi (Free Agent)

Out:

No.	Pos.	Nation	Player

=== Meizhou Hakka ===
In:

No.	Pos.	Nation	Player
43	MF	CHN	Cai Haochang (from (Portugal) Gondomar S.C.)

Out:

No.	Pos.	Nation	Player
9	FW	BRA	Dori (loan to Sichuan Jiuniu)
14	MF	CHN	Wang Pan (loan to Jiangxi Liansheng)

=== Nantong Zhiyun ===
In:

No.	Pos.	Nation	Player
45	DF	CHN	Wang Ning (Free Agent)

Out:

No.	Pos.	Nation	Player

=== Shaanxi Chang'an Athletic ===
In:

No.	Pos.	Nation	Player

Out:

No.	Pos.	Nation	Player
10	FW	NGA	Kingsley Onuegbu (loan to Xinjiang Tianshan Leopard)

=== Sichuan Jiuniu ===
In:

No.	Pos.	Nation	Player
21	FW	BRA	Dori (loan from Meizhou Hakka)

Out:

No.	Pos.	Nation	Player
14	MF	FRA	Jules Iloki (loan to Suzhou Dongwu)
20	DF	CHN	Ötkür Hesen (loan to Xi'an UKD)
-	DF	CHN	Wang Chao (loan to Beijing BIT)

=== Suzhou Dongwu ===
In:

No.	Pos.	Nation	Player
29	FW	NGA	Joseph Atule Junior (loan from (Nigeria) Galaxy Sports Academy)
36	MF	CHN	Hu Xingyu (loan from Chongqing Dangdai Lifan)
37	DF	CHN	Huang Lei (loan from Chongqing Dangdai Lifan)
38	MF	FRA	Jules Iloki (loan from Sichuan Jiuniu)
39	DF	CHN	Li Xiaoming (loan from Changchun Yatai)

Out:

No.	Pos.	Nation	Player

=== Taizhou Yuanda ===
In:

No.	Pos.	Nation	Player

Out:

No.	Pos.	Nation	Player

=== Xinjiang Tianshan Leopard ===
In:

No.	Pos.	Nation	Player
7	FW	NGA	Kingsley Onuegbu (loan from Shaanxi Chang'an Athletic)
25	FW	BDI	Bienvenue Kanakimana (loan from (Czech Republic) MFK Vyškov)

Out:

No.	Pos.	Nation	Player

=== Zhejiang Energy Greentown ===
In:

No.	Pos.	Nation	Player
13	MF	CHN	Yao Junsheng (loan from Shandong Luneng Taishan)
14	MF	CHN	Feng Gang (loan from Hebei China Fortune)

Out:

No.	Pos.	Nation	Player
