= Daniel Wong =

Daniel Wong may refer to:

- Daniel Wong (soccer)
- Daniel Wong Kwok-tung (born 1949), Hong Kong lawyer and politician
- Daniel Chi-Kwong Wong, Canadian criminal
