= Chen Yang (footballer) =

Chinese footballer and manager

Chen Yang 陈洋
Personal information
- Full name: Chen Yang
- Date of birth: 23 January 1977 (age 49)
- Place of birth: Shenyang, Liaoning, China
- Height: 1.72 m (5 ft 7 1/2 in)
- Position: Midfielder

Youth career
- 1985–1995: Liaoning FC

Senior career*
Years	Team	Apps	(Gls)
1995–2005	Liaoning FC		
2004	→ Nanjing Yoyo (loan)	28	(6)

Managerial career
- 2007–2014: Liaoning FC (assistant)
- 2014–2015: Liaoning FC (caretaker)
- 2016: China U-22 (caretaker)
- 2017: China U-22
- 2017: Wuhan Zall (assistant)
- 2017: Wuhan Zall
- 2018: Liaoning FC
- 2019–2020: Nei Mongol Zhongyou
- 2020–2024: Changchun Yatai
- * Club domestic league appearances and goals

Chen Yang (Chinese: 陈洋; born 23 January 1977 in Shenyang) is a Chinese football manager and former football player. He is most recently the manager of Chinese Super League club Changchun Yatai, whom he led to 2020 China League One title.

== Playing career ==
Chen Yang started to receive organized football training with Liaoning youth team system in 1985 when he was eight years old. He was promoted to first team in the 1995. He became the regular starter after Liaoning relegated to the second tier in 1996. However, he was diagnosed with cardiac muscle disease in 1998 and became a substitute player of the club. He became a regular starter again after Qu Shengqing left the club in 2001 and returned to bench in 2002 after Wang Xinxin joined the first team. He was put on the transfer list at the end of 2003 season. Although Chen once refused to join China League One side Nanjing Yoyo, he eventually moved to Nanjing Yoyo on a one-year loan deal to offset the transfer fee of Zhang Haifeng. Chen deliberately stayed at Nanjing Yoyo after his loan deal ended, but he had to return to Liaoning due to disagreement over his transfer fee. He announced his retirement at the end of the 2005 league season.

== Managerial career ==
Chen ran a restaurant after his retirement in 2006. He joined Liaoning Whowin's coaching staff in 2007 and became the assistant coach in 2008, assisting Ma Lin and Gao Sheng successively. On 9 April 2014, he was appointed as the temporary manager after Gao Sheng resigned from the club. On 2 August 2015, he resigned from Liaoning as the club struggled at the edge of relegation.

Chen was appointed as the caretaker manager of China U-22 after an open competition in August 2016. He was named as the manager of China U-22 in January 2017. However, he was replaced by Massimiliano Maddaloni, who was the assistant coach of Marcello Lippi in the China national team, in February 2017.

Chen followed Tang Yaodong to China League One side Wuhan Zall on 30 March 2017. He became the manager of the club on 9 July 2017 after Tang Yaodong resigned. He terminated his contract with Wuhan by mutual consent on 10 November 2017.

On 12 December 2017, Liaoning, who newly relegated to the second tier, appointed Chen as the manager for the second time, signing a three-year contract.

=== Changchun Yatai ===
On 5 October 2020, Chen was appointed as the new manager of China League One side Changchun Yatai after they made the decision to part ways with Uzbek manager Samvel Babayan. He led the team to promotion to the Chinese Super League after a 2-year absence by winning the 2020 China League One. He led Yatai to 4th in their first season back in the Chinese Super league, their highest position in the top division since finishing as runners-up in 2009. Yatai was rewarded a spot in the 2022 AFC Champions League qualifying stages, which the club later decided to forfeit due to COVID restrictions.

On 4 November 2023, Chen oversaw his 100th game in charge as the manager of Yatai in a 4–3 home defeat against Wuhan Three Towns, became the third person to achieve this milestone since Yin Tiesheng and Chen Jingang. Yatai endured a tough start to the 2024 Chinese Super League season and manager Chen resigned on 17 April as the team sitting bottom of the table after 4 consecutive defeats.

== Career statistics ==
=== Managerial statistics ===
As of 14 April 2024.

Team	From	To	Record				
Team	From	To	G	W	D	L	Win %
Liaoning F.C. (caretaker)	9 April 2014	2 August 2015	48	11	15	22	22.92
Wuhan Zall	9 July 2017	10 November 2017	13	5	4	4	38.46
Liaoning F.C.	12 December 2017	3 March 2019	32	12	8	12	37.50
Nel Mongol Zhongyou	4 March 2019	25 August 2020	31	15	6	10	48.39
Changchun Yatai	5 October 2020	14 April 2024	106	42	28	36	39.62
Total			230	85	61	84	36.96

== Honours ==
Changchun Yatai

- China League One: 2020
