= Danyar Musajan =

Chinese association football player

Personal information
- Date of birth: 12 October 1997 (age 29)
- Height: 1.74 m (5 ft 9 in)
- Position: Midfielder

Team information
- Current team: Ningxia Pingluo Hengli

Senior career*
Years	Team	Apps	(Gls)
2017–2021	Xinjiang Tianshan Leopard	87	(7)
2022	Guangxi Hengchen	0	(0)
2022–2023	Xinjiang Tianshan Leopard	0	(0)
2023	Guangxi Hengchen	0	(0)
2024	Xinjiang Silk Road Eagle	4	(0)
2024–2026	Changchun Xidu	23	(0)
2026–	Ningxia Pingluo Hengli	0	(0)
- * Club domestic league appearances and goals as of 01:59, 10 March 2026 (UTC)

Danyar Musajan (Chinese: 达尼亚尔·木沙江; born 12 October 1997) is a Chinese footballer currently playing as a midfielder for Chinese Champions League club Ningxia Pingluo Hengli.

== Career statistics ==
=== Club ===
As of 9 August 2021.

Club	Season	League			Cup		Other		Total	
Club	Season	Division	Apps	Goals	Apps	Goals	Apps	Goals	Apps	Goals
Xinjiang Tianshan Leopard	2017	China League One	14	0	1 (Note: Appearances in the Chinese FA Cup)	0	0	0	15	0
Xinjiang Tianshan Leopard	2018	China League One	6	0	1	0	0	0	7	0
Xinjiang Tianshan Leopard	2019	China League One	22	5	1	0	0	0	23	5
Xinjiang Tianshan Leopard	2020	China League One	14	1	0	0	2 (Note: Appearances in the China League One playoffs)	1	16	2
Xinjiang Tianshan Leopard	2021	China League One	13	0	0	0	0	0	13	0
Career total			69	6	3	0	2	1	74	7
