= Hu Xingyu =

Chinese association football player

Personal information
- Date of birth: 21 July 2001 (age 25)
- Place of birth: Changshou, Chongqing, China
- Height: 1.78 m (5 ft 10 in)
- Position: Midfielder

Youth career
- –2020: Chongqing Lifan

Senior career*
Years	Team	Apps	(Gls)
2020–2022	Chongqing Liangjiang Athletic	3	(0)
2020	→ Suzhou Dongwu (Loan)	5	(1)
2021	→ China U-20 (Loan)	4	(0)
2022	Chengdu Rongcheng	4	(0)
- * Club domestic league appearances and goals as of 14:01, 8 January 2023 (UTC)

Hu Xingyu (Chinese: 胡兴雨; born 21 July 2001) is a Chinese footballer plays as a midfielder.

== Club career ==
Hu Xingyu was promoted to the senior team of Chongqing Lifan within the 2020 Chinese Super League season and would make his debut in a Chinese FA Cup game on 19 September 2020 against Shanghai SIPG F.C. in a 3-2 defeat. He would be loaned out to Suzhou Dongwu F.C. and then China U-20, however he would leave the team after the club was dissolved on 24 May 2022 after the majority owner, Wuhan Dangdai Group could not restructure the clubs shareholdings and debt.

On 2 June 2022, Hu would join newly promoted top tier club Chengdu Rongcheng on a free transfer for the start of the 2022 Chinese Super League season. He would go on to make his debut in a league game on 16 June 2022 against Tianjin Jinmen Tiger in a 1-1 draw.

== Career statistics ==
As of 8 January 2023.

Club	Season	League			Cup		Continental		Other		Total	
Club	Season	Division	Apps	Goals	Apps	Goals	Apps	Goals	Apps	Goals	Apps	Goals
Chongqing Lifan	2020	Chinese Super League	0	0	1	0	–		–		1	0
Chongqing Lifan	2021	Chinese Super League	3	0	0	0	–		–		3	0
Chongqing Lifan	Total		3	0	1	0	0	0	0	0	4	0
Suzhou Dongwu (loan)	2020	China League One	5	1	0	0	–		–		5	1
China U-20 (loan)	2021	China League Two	4	0	0	0	–		–		4	0
Chengdu Rongcheng	2022	Chinese Super League	4	0	3	0	–		–		7	0
Career total			16	1	4	0	0	0	0	0	20	1
