= Ilyas Ilhar =

Chinese association football player

Personal information
- Date of birth: 13 January 1997 (age 29)
- Height: 1.76 m (5 ft 9 in)
- Position: Midfielder

Team information
- Current team: Xinjiang Tianshan Leopard
- Number: 29

Senior career*
Years	Team	Apps	(Gls)
2017–2023	Xinjiang Tianshan Leopard	14	(0)
- * Club domestic league appearances and goals as of 14:01, 17 August 2021 (UTC)

Ilyas Ilhar (Chinese: 伊力亚斯·伊力哈尔; born 13 January 1997) is a Chinese footballer, who most recently plays as a midfielder for Xinjiang Tianshan Leopard.

== Career statistics ==
=== Club ===
As of 17 August 2021.

Club	Season	League			Cup		Other		Total	
Club	Season	Division	Apps	Goals	Apps	Goals	Apps	Goals	Apps	Goals
Xinjiang Tianshan Leopard	2017	China League One	0	0	1 (Note: Appearances in the Chinese FA Cup)	0	0	0	1	0
Xinjiang Tianshan Leopard	2018	China League One	0	0	0	0	0	0	0	0
Xinjiang Tianshan Leopard	2019	China League One	0	0	0	0	0	0	0	0
Xinjiang Tianshan Leopard	2020	China League One	8	0	0	0	1 (Note: Appearances in the China League One playoffs)	0	9	0
Xinjiang Tianshan Leopard	2021	China League One	6	0	0	0	0	0	6	0
Career total			14	0	1	0	1	0	16	0
