= Changzhou Institute of Technology =

Education organization in Changzhou, China

Coordinates: 31°52′23″N 119°56′22″E

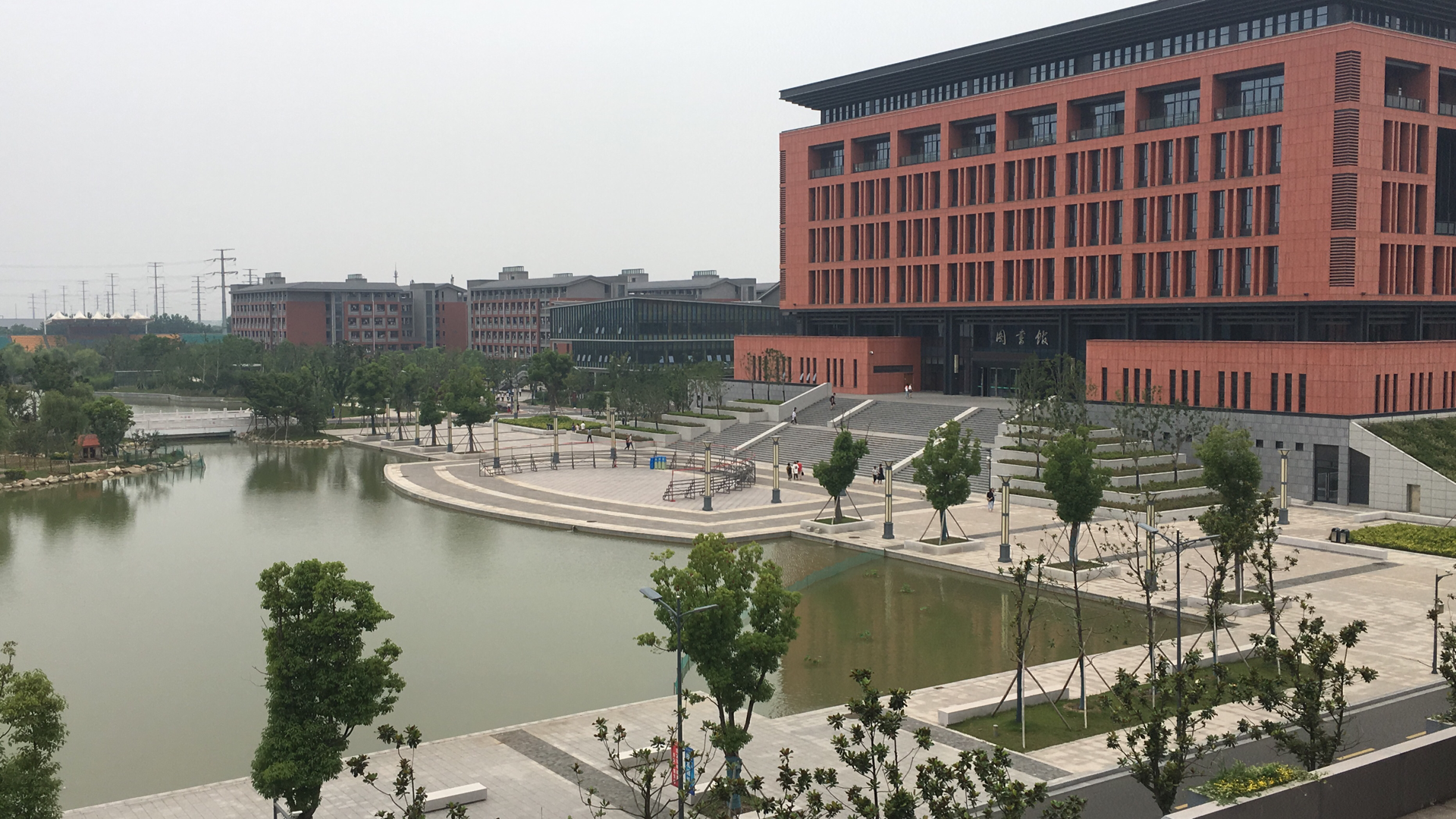
Changzhou Institute Of Technology library

Changzhou Institute of Technology (CZU; Chinese: 常州工学院) is an undergraduate institution in Changzhou in China's Jiangsu province. The Jiangsu Provincial Department of Education administers this college. The educational institution was established in 1978 as the Changzhou Industrial Technology College (Chinese: 常州工业技术学院). It was renamed the Changzhou Institute of Technology in March 2000. The school's campus occupies 28.67 ha (70.8 acres) and its floor area is 140,000 square metres (1,500,000 sq ft). Its departments include civil engineering, computer science, electrical engineering, mechanical engineering, and quality management.
