= Samvel Babayan (football coach) =

Uzbek football manager (born 1971)

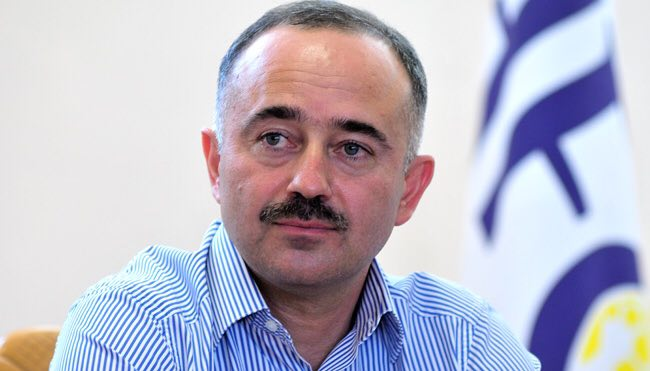
- Babayan in 2015

Personal information
- Full name: Samvel Vayecheslavovich Babayan
- Date of birth: 19 May 1971 (age 55)
- Place of birth: Tashkent, Soviet Union

Managerial career
- Years: Team
- 1996–?: Navbahor
- 2001–2002: Uzbekistan
- 2014–2015: Pakhtakor
- 2015–2017: Uzbekistan
- 2018: Lokomotiv Tashkent
- 2019–2020: Changchun Yatai
- 2021–: PFC Navbahor Namangan

Samvel Vyacheslavovich Babayan (born 19 May 1971) is an Uzbek football coach of Armenian origin. Currently, he is a coach of FC Andijon.

== Biography ==
Samvel Babayan was born in Tashkent on 19 May 1971. According to some available data, he graduated from the Tashkent State Institute of Physical Education with a degree in “trainer”.

=== Early career ===
Babyan played for various teams in the championship of the Uzbek SSR and ended his career early as a footballer.

In 1993 he was appointed administrator of the "Politotdel" club from the Tashkent region. In 1996, he was working in the coaching staff of the Namangan club "Navbahor" headed by Viktor Jalilov, and he became the champion of Uzbekistan.

In 2001, Babayan began to work as a manager in the national team of Uzbekistan. The next year, he became vice-president of the Tashkent club "Pakhtakor".

In 2014, after the abolition of the position of head coach at Pakhtakor, Babayan became the chief manager of the Tashkent club. In the same year, Pakhtakor won the national championship, and Babayan was recognized as the best coach of the year in Uzbekistan at the end of the year.

=== Uzbek national team ===
On 23 June 2015, after Mirjalol Qasimov resigned from the post of head coach of Uzbekistan, Babayan was appointed head coach in his place.

On 27 November 2015, Babayan was simultaneously appointed head coach of the Uzbek Olympic Team.

Under his leadership, the Olympic team performed unsuccessfully at the Asian Championships, which took place in January 2016 in Qatar, and failed to qualify to the 2016 Summer Olympics in Rio de Janeiro, failing to leave the group. After this setback, he was sacked from his post as head coach of the Olympic team and focused on the national team.

The team was unable to reach the final of the 2018 FIFA World Cup in Russia. Following the results of the third, final qualifying round, Uzbekistan took fourth place (out of six) in Group A, conceding the national teams of Iran, South Korea and Syria. On September 7, 2017, he was dismissed from the post of head coach of the Uzbek national team.

==== Lifetime suspension from football ====
On 15 January 2018, the Uzbekistan Football Federation suspended Babayan from any activity in the field of football for life, due to the machinations with the contracts of football players during his work in the Tashkent club "Pakhtakor". He was also accused of the failure of the Uzbek national team in the qualifying tournament for the 2018 World Cup. When choosing players for the national team, Babayan called up familiar football players who had a low level and performance, thus pursuing their personal commercial interests, ignoring the recommendations and advice of reputable coaches and specialists.

=== Work in Latvia ===
At the end of March 2018, he was appointed head coach of the Latvian club "Spartak" from Jūrmala, which caused great surprise among the fans and the media of Uzbekistan, since the coach was suspended for life from any football activity.

On 13 April 2018, it became known that Babayan was not awarded the European coaching license necessary to work in the Premier League of the Latvian Championship, so he could not coach the club. The audit was carried out by UEFA due to the fact that the licensing system for coaches in the AFC is different from that in UEFA. On April 23, he left the post of head coach of "Spartak" and was transferred to the post of technical director of the club.

=== Return to football in Uzbekistan ===
On 26 February 2019, the media reported on Babayan's appointment as an advisor to the president of the Lokomotiv football club from Tashkent. This information also appeared on the official website of the Tashkent Lokomotiv. This news caused sharp discontent among fans, and surprise among a number of journalists and the media, at the time of his suspension. Later, Babayan himself in a short interview said that his suspension was lifted on 1 February 2018, which is a little more than two weeks after his suspension.

Later, the UFF issued a special statement, saying that Samvel Babayan was dismissed from his post as head coach of the national team of Uzbekistan due to unsatisfactory results and due to the failure of the qualifying round for the 2018 World Cup. The statement indicates that more than 10 thousand letters were forwarded to the UUFF from fans who complained to the portal of the President of the Uzbekistan with complaints about Babayan. On 15 January 2018, the UFF opened a case against Babayan, and the bureau of the executive committee of this organization decided to dismiss Babayan from football activities for life. Further in the statement of the AFU it is said: “During the study of this case it was established that Samvel Babayan used the national team of Uzbekistan in his own interests. For this reason alone, it was already possible to close the doors of the national team for him forever. However, later, FC "Bunyodkor" applied to the executive committee of the AFU with a request to remove the disqualification from the former coach of the national team of Uzbekistan under the personal guarantee of the club. “FC“ Bunyodkor ”on personal responsibility asks for the mitigation of disciplinary sanctions against Samvel Babayan. It is worth considering the fact that the head of our state has repeatedly issued decrees pardoning people who were accused of grave crimes, but deeply repented of their deeds and firmly embarked on the path of correction. We believe that it is necessary to lend a helping hand to those who are guilty, but ready to work to atone for their guilt, guided by the principle of humanism. " It goes on to say: “Members of the AFU Executive Committee unanimously supported this appeal. Thus, the work of the AFU Executive Committee completed its work on the Babayan case on February 1, 2018, and the specialist's disqualification was canceled. During the work of Samvel Babayan, a lot of mistakes were made in the national team of Uzbekistan. AFU made the appropriate conclusions and tried to eliminate the shortcomings. In this regard, the AFU decided to appoint a foreign coach who is well acquainted with European and Latin American football, who has the potential to work with Uzbek footballers, and who has achieved outstanding success in his career, to the post of the head coach of the Uzbekistan national team. In the future, AFU will never allow Samvel Babayan to work in any national team of the country. In addition, the AFU has no complaints about the decision of Lokomotiv to hire Samvel Babayan in its club".

On 22 June 2019, he was appointed head coach of Lokomotiv Tashkent after the dismissal of Andrey Fyodorov due to unsatisfactory results.

On 24 June, before the match of the next round of the Super League of Uzbekistan, the first press conference of Babayan as head coach took place. The press conference aroused great interest among the Uzbek media and fans. During the press conference, a number of questions were asked from various media in the country. In particular, the journalists asked Babayan about the history of the suspension, as well as about his attitude to all the charges that were brought against him. During the press conference, Babayan denied all charges against him. Babayan noted about the story of life suspension that it was canceled 15 days after the decision of the Football Federation of Uzbekistan, and otherwise he would not have left to coach the Latvian club.

=== Changchun Yatai ===
In early December 2019, he became the head coach of the Chinese club Changchun Yatai.
