= Daniel Wong (soccer) =

Australian soccer player

Personal information
- Full name: Daniel Zhen Sheng Wong
- Date of birth: 17 November 1997 (age 28)
- Place of birth: Sydney, Australia
- Height: 1.72 m (5 ft 8 in)
- Position: Forward

Team information
- Current team: Sydney Olympic

Youth career
- Chesterfield

Senior career*
Years	Team	Apps	(Gls)
2016–2017	Espanyol B	1	(0)
2018	C.F.I. Alicante	2	(1)
2019	Jove Español	8	(1)
2020-2021	Beijing Renhe	6	(0)
2020	→ Inner Mongolia Zhongyou (loan)	1	(0)
2022	Shijiazhang Gongfu	12	(1)
2023-2024	Hang Sai	0	(0)
2024	Mt Druitt Town Rangers	24	(10)
2025	Sutherland Sharks	12	(2)
2026-	Sydney Olympic	8	(1)
- * Club domestic league appearances and goals

Daniel Zhen Sheng Wong (born 17 November 1997) is an Australian soccer player who last played as a forward for Sydney Olympic.

== Career ==
In 2016, Wong signed for the reserve side of Spanish La Liga team Espanyol from the youth academy of Chesterfield in England.

For the second half of 2018–19, he signed for Spanish fourth division team Jove Español, having left fellow Spanish side C.F.I. Alicante.

For the 2020 season, he signed for Beijing Renhe in the Chinese second division.
