= 2025 Chinese FA Cup =

CFA Cup
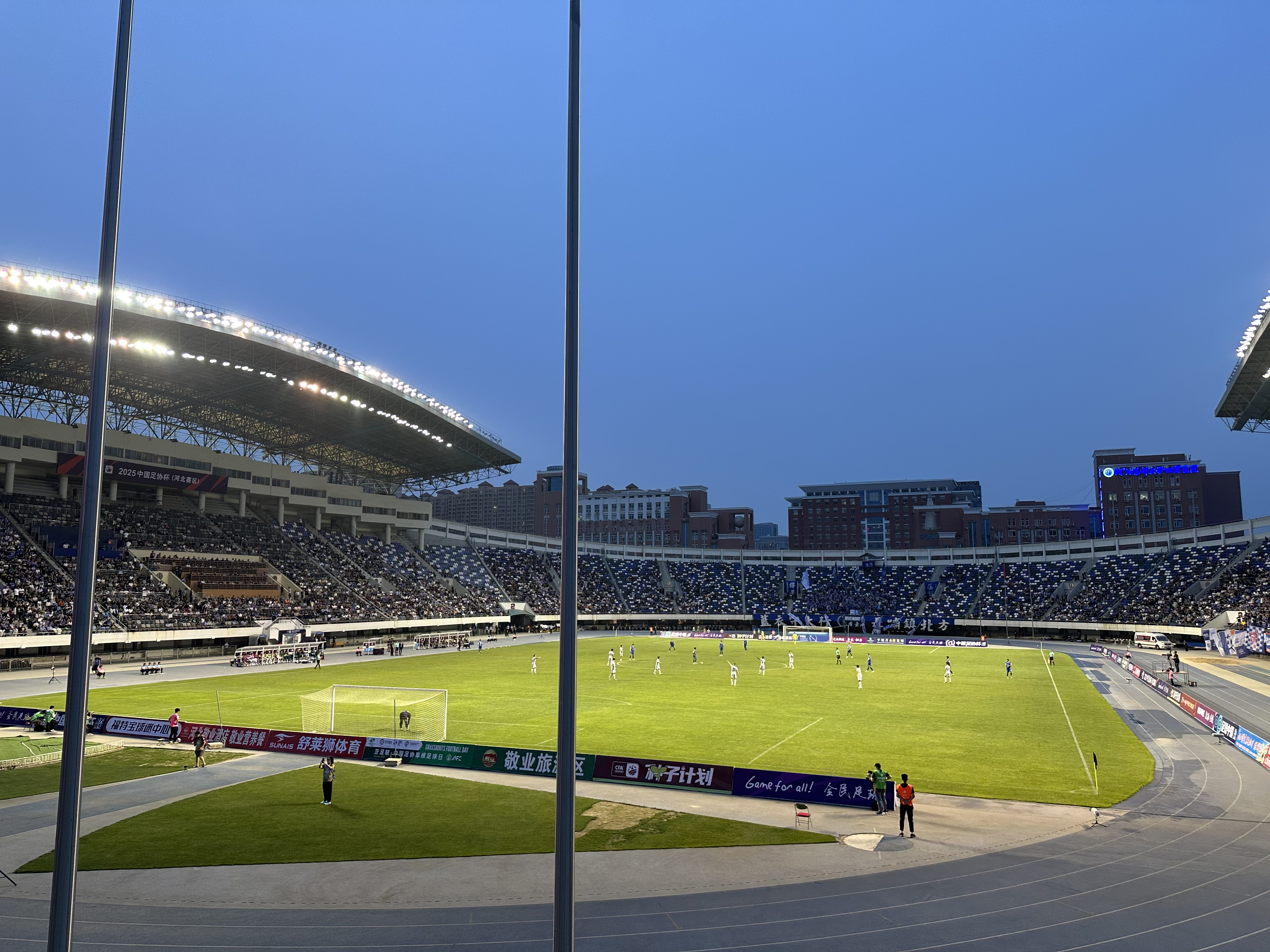
- Shijiazhuang Gongfu taking on eventual winners Beijing Guoan in May

Tournament details
- Country: China
- Dates: 14 March – 6 December 2025
- Teams: 64

Final positions
- Champions: Beijing Guoan (6th title)
- Runners-up: Henan
- Champions League Elite: Beijing Guoan

The 2025 Chinese Football Association Cup (Chinese: 2025中国足球协会杯) was the 27th edition of the Chinese FA Cup.

The defending champions were Chinese Super League side Shanghai Port, but they were unable to defend their title after losing to local rivals Shanghai Shenhua in the fourth round.

Beijing Guoan won their 6th title after beating Henan 3–0 in the final.

== Schedule ==
Round	Draw date	Match dates	Number of Fixtures	Clubs remaining	New entries this round	Divisions entering this round
First round	27 February 2025	14–16 March 2025	16	32 → 16	32	12 winners from qualifying round 20 2025 China League Two teams
Second round	27 February 2025	18–20 April 2025	16	32 → 16	16	16 2025 China League One teams
Third round	27 February 2025	20–21 May 2025	16	32 → 16	16	16 2025 Chinese Super League teams
Fourth round	27 May 2025	20–22 June 2025	8	16 → 8	None	None
Quarter-finals	27 May 2025	22–23 July 2025	4	8 → 4	None	None
Semi-finals	27 May 2025	19–20 August 2025	2	4 → 2	None	None
Final	27 May 2025	6 December 2025	1	2 → 1	None	None

== First round ==
The draw for the first round took place on 27 February 2025.

Number of teams per tier still in competition
Chinese Super League (Note: Chinese Super League teams joined the competition in the third round.)	China League One (Note: China League One teams joined the competition in the second round.)	China League Two	Amateur	Total
16 / 16	16 / 16	20 / 20	12 / 12	64 / 64

14 March 2025	Qingdao May Wind (A)	1–5	Tai'an Tiankuang (3)	Qingdao
14:00 UTC+8	Pang Chengtai 53'; Jiang Weipeng (yellow card) 87'		Nihat 11', 81'; Zhang Xingliang 63'; Ma Ruize 76'; Tian Xin (yellow card) 78'; Tan Fucheng 84'	Stadium: Qingdao West Coast University City Sports Center; Attendance: 10; Referee: Xu Qiangqiang

14 March 2025	Changchun Xidu (3)	0–1	Guangxi Hengchen (3)	Qujing
15:30 UTC+8	Wang Haisheng (yellow card) 80'; Qin Wanzhun (yellow card) 90+2'		Li Siqi (yellow card) 55'; Deng Huayi (yellow card) 58'; Zhang Huajun 66'; Wang Tianqing (yellow card) 90+4'	Stadium: Qujing EB Plateau Sports Training Base Stadium; Attendance: 189; Referee: Ma Yunkun

14 March 2025	Guangdong Red Treasure (A)	0–4	Guizhou Zhucheng Athletic (3)	Guangzhou
20:00 UTC+8	Xian Zhenglei (yellow card) 41'; Lu Tianming (yellow card) 47' (yellow-red card) 70'		Lu Wentao (yellow card) 3'; Zhou Ziheng 6'; Chen Xiangyu 14', 25'; Kong Yinquan (yellow card) 57'; Xie Jinzheng (yellow card) 80'; Zhang Jiaxin (yellow card) 90+1'; Shi Yiyi 90+5'	Stadium: Huadu Stadium; Attendance: 830; Referee: Mu Yuchen

15 March 2025	Shanghai Zetian (A)	0–2	Wuxi Wugo (3)	Shanghai
14:00 UTC+8	Yan Jiahao (yellow card) 73'		Tong Le 45+2' (pen.); Zhang Dachi 90'	Stadium: Hu Fa-kuang Stadium of Minhang Campus, Shanghai Jiao Tong University; Attendance: 823; Referee: Tang Man

15 March 2025	Shanghai Second (A)	1–0	Kunming City (3)	Shanghai
14:30 UTC+8	Li Jianbin (yellow card) 21'; Zheng Yifei 63'		Xue Yuxiang (yellow card) 20'	Stadium: Shanghai United Football Training Base Field No.2; Attendance: 43; Referee: Li Peng

15 March 2025	Shanghai Mitsubishi Fly Lions (A)	0–3	Nantong Haimen Codion (3)	Shanghai
14:30 UTC+8			Yan Ge 36' (pen.), 47', (yellow card) 33'; Chen Weijing 44'	Stadium: Lin'gang Football Comprehensive Sports Center Football Field; Attendance: 356; Referee: Geng Maoxiang

15 March 2025	Ningbo Ukang (A)	0–2	Guangdong Mingtu (3)	Ningbo
15:00 UTC+8	Chen Zhengfeng (yellow card) 14'; Yang Yuchao (yellow card) 36' (yellow-red card) 40'; Wang Wei (yellow card) 59'		Emirulla 81'; Yin Bowen 90+1'	Stadium: Ningbo Sports Center; Referee: Cui Yueqiang

15 March 2025	Shaanxi Northwest Youth (A)	4–1	Ganzhou Ruishi (3)	Weinan
15:00 UTC+8	Irfan 10', 45+2', 67'; Lü Sunhao 54'; Chen Huaiyuan (red card) 63'		Wang Jinpeng 7'; Wu Xinze (yellow card) 40'; Huang Yuxuan (yellow card) 69'	Stadium: Weinan Sports Center Stadium; Attendance: 1652; Referee: Han Lei

15 March 2025	Wuhan Lianzhen (A)	0–1	Shenzhen 2028 (3)	Wuhan
15:00 UTC+8	Song Defu (yellow card) 17'; Xiong Tao (yellow card) 30'; Chen Bo (yellow card) 34'; Ding Wei (yellow card) 70'		Luo Kaisa (yellow card) 6'; Xiang Ruoke (yellow card) 61'; Li Lehang (yellow card) 82'; Chen Ziwen 90+8'	Stadium: Hankou Cultural Sports Centre; Referee: Yan Xu

15 March 2025	Quanzhou Yassin (3)	2–3	Wenzhou (3)	Jinjiang
15:30 UTC+8	Li Zhuohang 20', (yellow card) 5'; Wang Yihan 26'; Su Jiale (yellow card) 58'		Sun Weikai 14'; Tian Jiarui (yellow card) 45+1'; Han Tianlin (yellow card) 60'; Ibrahim (yellow card) 72'; Rehmitulla 74'; Wang Guanqiao (yellow card) 75'; Ruan Sai 81'	Stadium: Jinjiang Football Training Center Stadium; Attendance: 358; Referee: Jiao Zi

15 March 2025	Guangzhou Dandelion Alpha (3)	3–2	Hubei Istar (3)	Guangzhou
15:30 UTC+8	Yang Youxian 36', 45+1' (pen.), (yellow card) 55'; Chen Yuhao (yellow card) 63'; Luo Kai 68'; Long Wenhao (yellow card) 75'		Huang Wenzheng 38'; Xiong Jizheng (yellow card) 45'; Yu Tianle (yellow card) 45+1'; Wen Jialong 77'	Stadium: Zengcheng Kangwei Stadium; Attendance: 345; Referee: Liu Chentao

15 March 2025	Shenzhen Jixiang (A)	1–0	Guangxi Lanhang (3)	Shenzhen
19:30 UTC+8	Abliz 64'; Liu Guoqiang (yellow card) 88'		Cheng Hui (yellow card) 78'; Yu Xueyi (yellow card) 89'	Stadium: Shenzhen Youth Football Training Base Field No.1; Attendance: 481; Referee: Dan Ning

16 March 2025	Shanxi Chongde Ronghai (3)	0–1	Lanzhou Longyuan Athletic (3)	Changzhi
14:30 UTC+8	Huang Cong (yellow card) 48'		Yang Shengming 90+6', (yellow card) 42'	Stadium: Tunliu Sports Center Stadium; Attendance: 1288; Referee: Li Pengda

16 March 2025	Xiamen Chengyi (A)	0–3	Jiangxi Lushan (3)	Xiamen
15:00 UTC+8	Chen Hailong (yellow card) 20'		Zhang Yanjun 10'; Luo Andong (yellow card) 30'; Guo Song 74'; Song Yi 79'	Stadium: Haicang Sports Center Stadium; Attendance: 863; Referee: Zhang Yi

16 March 2025	Chongqing Chunlei (A)	0–0 (3–1 p)	Beijing IT (3)	Chongqing
15:30 UTC+8	Zhou Xiao (yellow card) 16'; Cheng Xianfeng (yellow card) 59'; Lin Jinghao (yellow card) 71'			Stadium: Jiangjin District Stadium; Attendance: 3866; Referee: Liu Wei
	Penalties
	Liu Tingpeng (penalty scored); Zhou Xiao (penalty scored); Jiang Hang (penalty missed); Lin Jinghao (penalty scored)		(penalty missed) Zeng Yuxiang; (penalty scored) Wang Jiakun; (penalty missed) Zhong Jingcheng; (penalty missed) Tai Atai

16 March 2025	Quanzhou Qinggong (A)	0–0 (5–4 p)	Hangzhou Linping Wuyue (3)	Jinjiang
15:30 UTC+8	Guo Jing (yellow card) 90+7'; Li Zhengyu (yellow card) 90+7'		Gao Tianyu (yellow card) 57'	Stadium: Quanzhou Vocational and Technical University Football Field; Attendance: 983; Referee: Wu Kai
	Penalties
	Zhao Hongxu (penalty scored); Xue Xitong (penalty scored); Luo Aodi (penalty scored); Kang Jiayuan (penalty scored); Guo Jing (penalty scored)		(penalty missed) An Shuo; (penalty scored) Qin Qiang; (penalty scored) Yang Xudong; (penalty scored) Li Hao; (penalty scored) Yang Chenyu

== Second round ==
The draw for the second round took place on 27 February 2025.

Number of teams per tier still in competition
Chinese Super League	China League One	China League Two	Amateur	Total
16 / 16	16 / 16	11 / 20	5 / 12	48 / 64

18 April 2025	Lanzhou Longyuan Athletic (3)	0–2	Liaoning Tieren (2)	Lanzhou
19:00 UTC+8	Tai Jianfeng (yellow card) 54'		Zhang Jiaming 32', (yellow card) 34'; Gao Haisheng (yellow card) 67'; Xu Dong (yellow card) 82'; Zang Yifeng 86'	Stadium: Lanzhou Olympic Center Stadium; Attendance: 13,898; Referee: Li Wei

18 April 2025	Guangdong Mingtu (3)	2–2 (3–5 p)	Shenzhen Juniors (2)	Guangzhou
19:30 UTC+8	Li Tianyou 32'; He Jialin 41'; Peng Jiahao (yellow card) 52'; Zhu Xinyu (yellow card) 82'		Liang Rifu (yellow card) 51'; Men Yang 56' (pen.); Lu Jingsen 86'	Stadium: Huadu Stadium; Attendance: 486; Referee: Liu Chentao
	Penalties
	Yin Bowen (penalty missed); Zhong Wenze (penalty scored); Chen Lunjing (penalty scored); Zhao Chenwei (penalty scored)		(penalty scored) Xie Baoxian; (penalty scored) Liang Rifu; (penalty scored) Gao Jialiang; (penalty scored) Men Yang; (penalty scored) Lu Jingsen

18 April 2025	Guizhou Zhucheng Athletic (3)	2–1	Foshan Nanshi (2)	Guiyang
19:30 UTC+8	Xie Jinzheng (yellow card) 43'; Lu Wentao 60'; Chen Chenzhenyang 71'		Zhang Zhihao (yellow card) 45+2'; Huang Chuqi 90+4'	Stadium: Guiyang Olympic Sports Center; Attendance: 5,355; Referee: Dan Ning

19 April 2025	Shanghai Second (A)	0–2	Jiangxi Dingnan United (2)	Shanghai
14:30 UTC+8	Fan Qunxiao (red card) 27'; Nie Meng (yellow card) 86'		Ren Wei (yellow card) 45+3'; Zhu Jiaxuan 59'; Zhang Zimin (yellow card) 79'; Zhang Jiansheng 80'	Stadium: Shanghai United Football Training Base Field No.2; Attendance: 38; Referee: Geng Maoxiang

19 April 2025	Quanzhou Qinggong (A)	0–4	Suzhou Dongwu (2)	Jinjiang
14:30 UTC+8			Wang Yifan 51'; Ma Fuyu 57'; Zanhar 67'; Fan Xulin 82'	Stadium: Quanzhou Vocational and Technical University Football Field; Attendance: 977; Referee: Qin Xiaohan

19 April 2025	Wuxi Wugo (3)	2–0	Nantong Zhiyun (2)	Wuxi
15:00 UTC+8	Ahmat (yellow card) 69'; Tong Le 79' (pen.); Hu Shengjia 82'		Kamiran (yellow card) 71'	Stadium: Wuxi Sports Center; Attendance: 2,438; Referee: Zhang Chao

19 April 2025	Shaanxi Northwest Youth (A)	0–1	Chongqing Tonglianglong (2)	Weinan
15:00 UTC+8	Sun Rui (yellow card) 3'; Yang Peng (yellow card) 31'		Wang Wenxuan (yellow card) 37'; Tong Zhicheng (yellow card) 40'; Ruan Qilong 45+2'; Zhang Haixuan (yellow card) 90'	Stadium: Weinan Sports Center Stadium; Attendance: 1,955; Referee: Chen Jindong

19 April 2025	Wenzhou (3)	0–3	Dalian K'un City (2)	Wenzhou
15:30 UTC+8	Zhang Hongjiang (yellow card) 36'		Zhao Shuhao (yellow card) 6'; Liu Zhizhi 61', (yellow card) 61'; Chen Rong 76'; Chen Jiaqi 81'	Stadium: Wenzhou Sports Centre; Attendance: 1,493; Referee: Zhang Haoheng

19 April 2025	Jiangxi Lushan (3)	0–1	Qingdao Red Lions (2)	Ruichang
15:30 UTC+8	Xu Yougang (yellow card) 27'; Qaharman (yellow card) 31'; Sabit (yellow card) 60'; Zhou Jingxiang (yellow card) 90+2'		Zhao Chengle (yellow card) 45+1'; Pi Ziyang 45+4'	Stadium: Ruichang Sports Park Stadium; Attendance: 1,358; Referee: He Xiaochun

19 April 2025	Guangzhou Dandelion Alpha (3)	1–0	Nanjing City (2)	Guangzhou
15:30 UTC+8	Liu Jiqiang 75'; Li Haoyu (yellow card) 90+5'		Dong Xin (yellow card) 32'	Stadium: Zengcheng Kangwei Stadium; Attendance: 681; Referee: Ma Teng

19 April 2025	Guangxi Hengchen (3)	2–1	Shanghai Jiading Huilong (2)	Nanning
15:30 UTC+8	Guo Zicheng (yellow card) 11'; Chen Dongtao (yellow card) 17'; Feng Yifan 32'; Yao Zixuan 56'; Wei Chaolun (yellow card) 90+3'		Fang Zhengyang 36' (o.g.); Su Shihao (yellow card) 79'; Wang Hanyu (yellow card) 84'	Stadium: Nanning Sports School Wuhe Campus Football Field; Attendance: 495; Referee: Xiong Xing

19 April 2025	Shenzhen 2028 (3)	0–4	Shaanxi Union (2)	Shenzhen
16:00 UTC+8	Chen Ziwen (yellow card) 74'		Tan Kaiyuan 5', 38'; Ruan Jun (yellow card) 51'; Zhang Yuxuan 57'; Xu Dongdong 77'	Stadium: Shenzhen Youth Football Training Base Centre Stadium; Attendance: 308; Referee: Guo Xiang

19 April 2025	Shenzhen Jixiang (A)	0–0 (7–8 p)	Yanbian Longding (2)	Shenzhen
19:30 UTC+8	Wang Minjie (yellow card) 75'; Duan Yishuo (yellow card) 85'; Zhang Zhichao (yellow card) 90+2'		Yang Erhai (yellow card) 6'	Stadium: Shenzhen Youth Football Training Base Field No.1; Attendance: 528; Referee: Yan Xu
	Penalties
	Ilaldin (penalty scored); Yang Chengyu (penalty scored); Huang Linfeng (penalty scored); Duan Yishuo (penalty missed); Abliz Memet (penalty scored); Zhang Yujun (penalty scored); Chen Xiao (penalty scored); Wang Minjie (penalty scored); Li Lingwei (penalty missed)		Han Guangmin (penalty scored); Li Ximin (penalty missed); Zhang Hao (penalty scored); Gao Yunpeng (penalty scored); Li Da (penalty scored); Che Zeping (penalty scored); Lin Taijun (penalty scored); Lobsang Khedrup (penalty scored); Xu Wenguang (penalty scored)

20 April 2025	Tai'an Tiankuang (3)	0–2	Shijiazhuang Gongfu (2)	Tai'an
15:00 UTC+8	Lu Hongda (yellow card) 42'; Tian Xin (yellow card) 90+4'		Chen Zhexuan 22'; Deng Jiajie 47', (yellow card) 23'; Zhao Yubao (yellow card) 64'	Stadium: Wenhe Sports Park Stadium; Attendance: 819; Referee: Li Peng

20 April 2025	Chongqing Chunlei (A)	1–1 (8–9 p)	Guangdong GZ-Power (2)	Chongqing
15:30 UTC+8	Lin Jinghao 63', (yellow card) 90+4'		Xiao Jiaqi (red card) 17'; Cui Xinglong (yellow card) 61'; Wu Xingyu 76'	Stadium: Longxing Football Stadium Training Field No.1; Attendance: 499; Referee: Gu Zhongchao
	Penalties
	Liu Tingpeng (penalty scored); Dan Yiming (penalty scored); Jiang Hang (penalty scored); Lin Jinghao (penalty scored); Zhang Cheng (penalty scored); Molen (penalty scored); Huang Jianjian (penalty missed); Zhao Shizhuo (penalty scored); Umit (penalty scored); Li Yihe (penalty missed)		Xia Dalong (penalty scored); Zeng Chao (penalty scored); Hou Yu (penalty scored); Wu Xingyu (penalty scored); Liang Xuemeng (penalty scored); Yan Zihao (penalty scored); Shan Pengfei (penalty missed); Yang Hao (penalty scored); Deng Biao (penalty scored); Chen Zhao (penalty scored)

20 April 2025	Nantong Haimen Codion (3)	0–1	Guangxi Pingguo (2)	Nantong
15:30 UTC+8			Yang Jingfan (yellow card) 60'; Yang Hang 90+3'	Stadium: Haimen Sports Centre; Attendance: 756; Referee: Wang Jian

== Third round ==
The draw for the third round took place on 27 February 2025.

Number of teams per tier still in competition
Chinese Super League	China League One	China League Two	Amateur	Total
16 / 16	12 / 16	4 / 20	0 / 12	32 / 64

20 May 2025	Shaanxi Union (2)	2–1	Wuhan Three Towns (1)	Weinan
15:30 UTC+8	Abduwahap 49'; Darfalou 60', (yellow card) 45+3'; Xie Zhiwei (yellow card) 77'		Zhong Jinbao 16'	Stadium: Weinan Sports Center Stadium; Attendance: 4,318; Referee: Zhang Lei

20 May 2025	Guangzhou Dandelion Alpha (3)	0–1	Zhejiang (1)	Guangzhou
15:30 UTC+8	Huang Peizhao (yellow card) 74'; Diao Jiahao (yellow card) 77'		Yao Junsheng (yellow card) 19'; Wang Yudong 22'	Stadium: Zengcheng Kangwei Stadium; Attendance: 608; Referee: Li Wei

20 May 2025	Guangxi Hengchen (3)	2–1	Meizhou Hakka (1)	Nanning
17:00 UTC+8	Guo Zicheng 31'; Wei Chaolun (yellow card) 72'; Huang Yonghai 73'; Zhang Huajun (yellow card) 86'; Chen Dongtao (yellow card) 89'		Ji Shengpan 22'; Chen Xuhuang (yellow card) 53'; Wang Jianan (yellow card) 70'	Stadium: Nanning Sports School Wuhe Campus Football Field; Attendance: 908; Referee: Zhang Yangfan

21 May 2025	Shenzhen Juniors (2)	1–5	Dalian Yingbo (1)	Shenzhen
15:00 UTC+8	Men Yang 62'; Mai Sijing (yellow card) 83'		Malele 12'; Huang Shan 36'; Zakaria Labyad 55'; Mao Weijie 68'; Yan Peng 80'	Stadium: Longhua Cultural and Sports Center; Attendance: 523; Referee: He Xin

21 May 2025	Yanbian Longding (2)	0–2	Qingdao West Coast (1)	Yanji
15:00 UTC+8	Gao Yunpeng (yellow card) 29'; Zheng Zhiyu (yellow card) 58'; Li Ximin (yellow card) 88'		Xiang Rongjun (yellow card) 28'; Liu Langzhou 55'; Davidson 90+3'	Stadium: Yanji Stadium; Attendance: 4,105; Referee: Shan Dan'ao

21 May 2025	Wuxi Wugo (3)	0–3	Shanghai Shenhua (1)	Wuxi
15:30 UTC+8	Hu Jiaqi (yellow card) 49'		Yu Hanchao 23', 25'; Gao Tianyi 88'	Stadium: Wuxi Sports Center; Attendance: 6,168; Referee: Xiong Xing

21 May 2025	Jiangxi Dingnan United (2)	1–2	Yunnan Yukun (1)	Dingnan
15:30 UTC+8	He Shaolin (yellow card) 7'; Erikys 59', (yellow card) 71'		Yang He (yellow card) 44'; Han Zilong 87', (yellow card) 65'; Pedro Henrique 90+4'	Stadium: Jiangxi Dingnan Youth Football Training Center Stadium; Attendance: 1,018; Referee: Jia Zhiliang

21 May 2025	Guangdong GZ-Power (2)	2–2 (5–4 p)	Shenzhen Peng City (1)	Guangzhou
17:00 UTC+8	Xia Dalong 6', 41'; Xue Sibo (yellow card) 70'; Huang Shenghao (yellow card) 85'		Sarkaria 49'; Zhou Dadi 65'; Jiang Zhipeng (yellow card) 70'; Karzev (yellow card) 90+3'	Stadium: Huadu Stadium; Attendance: 1,005; Referee: Dai Yige
	Penalties
	Nikão (penalty scored); Liang Xueming (penalty scored); Chen Guoliang (penalty scored); Xia Dalong (penalty scored); João Carlos (penalty scored)		Jiang Zhipeng (penalty missed); Dugalić (penalty scored); Sarkaria (penalty scored); Zhou Dadi (penalty scored); Karzev (penalty scored)

21 May 2025	Dalian K'un City (2)	1–1 (4–3 p)	Changchun Yatai (1)	Dalian
19:00 UTC+8	Zhu Shiyu 49'		He Yiran (yellow card) 17'; Yao Xuchen (yellow card) 53'; Tan Long 66'; Berić (yellow card) 78'; Rosić (yellow card) 79'	Stadium: Jinzhou Stadium; Attendance: 1,512; Referee: He Kai
	Penalties
	Cui Hao (penalty scored); Lü Pin (penalty scored); Lei Wenjie (penalty missed); Zhao Shuhao (penalty scored); Song Zhiwei (penalty scored)		Rosić (penalty missed); Yao Xuchen (penalty scored); Berić (penalty scored); He Yiran (penalty scored); Tan Long (penalty missed)

21 May 2025	Liaoning Tieren (2)	0–0 (2–4 p)	Qingdao Hainiu (1)	Shenyang
19:00 UTC+8	Kouamé (yellow card) 19'		Xiao Kun (yellow card) 45+2'	Stadium: Shenyang Urban Stadium; Attendance: 4,521; Referee: Gan Shuran
	Penalties
	Felipe (penalty scored); Zang Yifeng (penalty missed); Li Peng (penalty missed); Zhang Jiaming (penalty scored)		Zheng Long (penalty scored); Song Long (penalty scored); Sha Yibo (penalty scored); Wong Ho Chun (penalty missed); Che Shiwei (penalty scored)

21 May 2025	Chongqing Tonglianglong (2)	1–2	Henan (1)	Chongqing
19:30 UTC+8	Zhang Zhixiong (yellow card) 44'; Bai Yutao (yellow card) 45'; Wu Yongqiang 83'		Cardoso 16'; Li Xingxian 34', (yellow card) 55'; Xu Jiamin (yellow card) 86'; Zheng Dalun (yellow card) 90'; Yang Kuo (yellow card) 90+4'	Stadium: Tongliang Long Stadium; Attendance: 6,750; Referee: Du Jianxin

21 May 2025	Shijiazhuang Gongfu (2)	0–5	Beijing Guoan (1)	Shijiazhuang
19:30 UTC+8	Zhan Sainan (red card) 56'		Dawhan 16'; Wang Ziming 30', 76'; Zhang Xizhe 57'; Zhang Yuan 68'	Stadium: Yutong International Sports Center; Attendance: 10,530; Referee: Memetjan Ahmet

21 May 2025	Qingdao Red Lions (2)	0–5	Shandong Taishan (1)	Qingdao
19:30 UTC+8	Hao Yucheng (yellow card) 57'		Cryzan 12', 58'; Wang Dalei (yellow card) 28'; Chen Pu 38'; Peng Xinli (yellow card) 59'; Lu Yongtao 79'; Liu Yang 85'	Stadium: Qingdao Tiantai Stadium; Attendance: 6,603; Referee: Liang Songshang

21 May 2025	Suzhou Dongwu (2)	2–6	Shanghai Port (1)	Suzhou
19:30 UTC+8	Ma Fuyu 21'; Wu Junjie 52'; Xu Wu (yellow card) 57'; Chen Ao (yellow card) 83'		Xu Xin (yellow card) 15'; Gabrielzinho 24'; Jussa 48'; Gustavo 60', 82'; Kuai Jiwen 69'; Browning (yellow card) 83'; Yang Shiyuan (yellow card) 90+3'; Li Shenglong 90+5'	Stadium: Suzhou Sports Center; Attendance: 10,689; Referee: Niu Minghui

21 May 2025	Guangxi Pingguo (2)	0–3	Chengdu Rongcheng (1)	Pingguo
19:30 UTC+8	Yao Diran (yellow card) 23'; Chen Quanjiang (yellow card) 74'		Wang Dongsheng 15'; Yan Dinghao 66'; Rômulo 90+3'	Stadium: Pingguo Stadium; Attendance: 4,867; Referee: Huang Yi

21 May 2025	Guizhou Zhucheng Athletic (3)	0–1	Tianjin Jinmen Tiger (1)	Guiyang
20:00 UTC+8	Zheng Shengxiong (yellow card) 26'		Wang Zhenghao 10'	Stadium: Guiyang Olympic Sports Center; Attendance: 11,836; Referee: Cui Yong

== Fourth round ==
The draw for the fourth round took place on 27 May 2025.

Number of teams per tier still in competition
Chinese Super League	China League One	China League Two	Amateur	Total
12 / 16	3 / 16	1 / 20	0 / 12	16 / 64

20 June 2025	Shandong Taishan (1)	1–3	Chengdu Rongcheng (1)	Jinan
19:35 UTC+8	Zeca (yellow card) 37'; Gazal 53', (yellow card) 60'; Li Yuanyi (yellow card) 72'		Rômulo 39', 61'; Tim Chow 83' (pen.), (yellow card) 55'; Wei Shihao (yellow card) 63'	Stadium: Jinan Olympic Sports Center Stadium; Attendance: 23,916; Referee: Memetjan Ahmet

21 June 2025	Dalian Yingbo (1)	1–1 (a.e.t.) (5–6 p)	Beijing Guoan (1)	Dalian
19:00 UTC+8	Jin Pengxiang (yellow card) 43'; Malele 45+1' (pen.); Zhu Pengyu (yellow card) 68'; Song Yue (yellow card) 90+2'; Lü Zhuoyi (yellow card) 90+6'		Spajić (yellow card) 57'; Zhang Yuning 90'; Arturo Cheng (yellow card) 90+9'	Stadium: Dalian Suoyuwan Football Stadium; Attendance: 60,028; Referee: Gan Shuran
	Penalties
	Malele (penalty missed); Cao Haiqing (penalty scored); Liao Jintao (penalty scored); Zhao Xuebin (penalty scored); Alimi (penalty missed); Lü Zhuoyi (penalty scored); Karanga (penalty scored); Liu Yi (penalty missed)		Fabio (penalty missed); Spajić (penalty scored); Guga (penalty missed); Dawhan (penalty scored); Serginho (penalty scored); Zhang Yuning (penalty scored); Ngadeu (penalty scored); Nebijan (penalty scored)

21 June 2025	Shaanxi Union (2)	1–2	Yunnan Yukun (1)	Weinan
19:00 UTC+8	Liang Shaowen 73', (yellow card) 75'		Han Zilong (yellow card) 8'; Pedro Henrique 36'; Maritu 57'	Stadium: Weinan Sports Center Stadium; Attendance: 21,031; Referee: Meng Xiangkun

21 June 2025	Guangdong GZ-Power (2)	2–0	Tianjin Jinmen Tiger (1)	Guangzhou
19:30 UTC+8	Ma Junliang 61'; João Carlos 74'		Wang Xianjun (yellow card) 81'	Stadium: Yuexiushan Stadium; Attendance: 3,728; Referee: Ma Yunkun

21 June 2025	Qingdao Hainiu (1)	2–1	Guangxi Hengchen (3)	Qingdao
19:35 UTC+8	Jin Yonghao 9'; Luo Senwen 34', (yellow card) 30'; Mu Pengfei (yellow card) 90+3'		Wang Tianqing (yellow card) 26'; Ji Xinlong 57'	Stadium: Qingdao Youth Football Stadium; Attendance: 11,650; Referee: Chen Jindong

22 June 2025	Shanghai Port (1)	2–3	Shanghai Shenhua (1)	Shanghai
18:00 UTC+8	Gabrielzinho 46'; Vital (yellow card) 48'; Gustavo 59'; Jussa (yellow card) 90+4'; Li Shuai (yellow card) 90+8'		Teixeira (yellow card) 31'; André Luis 44', 49', 67'; Gao Tianyi (yellow card) 45+1'; Yu Hanchao (yellow card) 90+8'	Stadium: Pudong Football Stadium; Attendance: 23,032; Referee: Li Haixin

22 June 2025	Dalian K'un City (2)	0–2	Qingdao West Coast (1)	Dalian
18:00 UTC+8	Song Chen (yellow card) 40'; Lei Wenjie (yellow card) 51'		Feng Gang (yellow card) 26'; He Longhai (yellow card) 30'; Gao Di (yellow card) 33'; Yakubu 65'; Davidson 90+2'	Stadium: Jinzhou Stadium; Attendance: 5,011; Referee: Cui Yong

22 June 2025	Henan (1)	3–2	Zhejiang (1)	Zhengzhou
19:30 UTC+8	Zhong Yihao 60'; Wang Shangyuan 63'; Cardoso 86'		Franko 11'; Yao Junsheng (yellow card) 35'; Liu Haofan 68'; Sun Guowen (yellow card) 74'; Yue Xin (yellow card) 90+10'	Stadium: Hanghai Stadium; Attendance: 13,031; Referee: Tang Shunqi

== Quarter-finals ==
The draw for the quarter-finals took place on 27 May 2025.

Number of teams per tier still in competition
Chinese Super League	China League One	China League Two	Amateur	Total
7 / 16	1 / 16	0 / 20	0 / 12	8 / 64

22 July 2025	Qingdao West Coast (1)	2–2 (a.e.t.) (2–4 p)	Beijing Guoan (1)	Qingdao
19:00 UTC+8	Matheus Índio (yellow card) 36'; Yakubu 62'; Davidson 119'		Wang Ziming 52'; Spajić (yellow card) 58'; Cao Yongjing 117', (yellow card) 117'	Stadium: Qingdao West Coast University City Sports Center; Attendance: 18,677; Referee: Shan Dan'ao
	Penalties
	Yakubu (penalty missed); Matheus Índio (penalty missed); Duan Liuyu (penalty scored); Ding Haifeng (penalty scored)		(penalty scored) Abreu; (penalty scored) Ngadeu; (penalty scored) Nebijan; (penalty scored) Dawhan

22 July 2025	Yunnan Yukun (1)	3–0	Guangdong GZ-Power (2)	Yuxi
20:00 UTC+8	Luo Jing 5'; Maritu 39', 48'; Dilmurat (yellow card) 79'			Stadium: Yuxi Plateau Sports Center Stadium; Attendance: 21,585; Referee: Gao Peng

23 July 2025	Shanghai Shenhua (1)	3–3 (a.e.t.) (7–8 p)	Henan (1)	Shanghai
19:00 UTC+8	Asué 20'; Teixeira (yellow card) 73'; Manafá 86'; Liu Chengyu 102'		Abdurasul (yellow card) 19'; Cardoso 33', 114', (yellow card) 105'; Acheampong 53'; Maia (yellow card) 112'	Stadium: Shanghai Stadium; Attendance: 36,512; Referee: Gan Shuran
	Penalties
	Wu Xi (penalty scored); Yennaris (penalty scored); Yu Hanchao (penalty scored); Yang Haoyu (penalty scored); Teixeira (penalty missed); Jiang Shenglong (penalty scored); Zhu Chenjie (penalty scored); Xu Haoyang (penalty missed); Manafá (penalty scored); Liu Chengyu (penalty missed)		Cardoso (penalty missed); Maidana (penalty scored); Wang Shangyuan (penalty scored); Maia (penalty scored); Gerbig (penalty scored); Niu Ziyi (penalty scored); Yeljan (penalty scored); Huang Zichang (penalty missed); Huang Ruifeng (penalty scored); Lu Yongtao (penalty scored)

23 July 2025	Qingdao Hainiu (1)	1–2	Chengdu Rongcheng (1)	Qingdao
19:35 UTC+8	Luo Senwen (red card) 30'; Lamkel Zé 85'		Delgado (yellow card) 38' (red card) 45+10'; Letschert (yellow card) 45+5'; Wei Shihao 51', 72'	Stadium: Qingdao Youth Football Stadium; Attendance: 16,506; Referee: He Kai

== Semi-finals ==
The draw for the semi-finals took place on 27 May 2025.

Number of teams per tier still in competition
Chinese Super League	China League One	China League Two	Amateur	Total
4 / 16	0 / 16	0 / 20	0 / 12	4 / 64

19 August 2025	Chengdu Rongcheng (1)	0–0 (a.e.t.) (3–4 p)	Henan (1)	Chengdu
19:35 UTC+8	Letschert (yellow card) 46'; Felipe (yellow card) 84'; Wei Shihao (yellow card) 108'		Maia (yellow card) 34'; Cardoso (yellow card) 83'; Yang Yilin (yellow card) 90+1'; Lu Yongtao (yellow card) 118'	Stadium: Phoenix Hill Football Stadium; Attendance: 41,024; Referee: Memetjan Ahmat
	Penalties
	Chow (penalty scored); Rômulo (penalty missed); Felipe (penalty scored); Yan Dinghao (penalty scored); Letschert (penalty missed)		Cardoso (penalty scored); Gerbig (penalty scored); Maia (penalty missed); Maidana (penalty scored); Yeljan (penalty scored)

20 August 2025	Beijing Guoan (1)	7–0	Yunnan Yukun (1)	Beijing
19:35 UTC+8	Abreu 26'; Wang Gang 38'; Wu Shaocong (yellow card) 40'; Guga 45+4'; Lin Liangming 64'; Jiang Wenhao 70'; Zhang Xizhe 76'; Zhang Yuning 78'		Burcă (red card) 31'	Stadium: Workers' Stadium; Attendance: 48,099; Referee: Liu Wei

== Final ==
The draw for the final took place on 27 May 2025.

6 December 2025
19:00 UTC+8

Beijing Guoan (1)	3–0	Henan (1)
Abreu 16', 45+7' (pen.), 90+2' (pen.)

Suzhou Olympic Sports Centre, Suzhou
Attendance: 40,558
Referee: Ko Hyung-jin (South Korea)
