= Zhang Jiaming =

Chinese footballer (born 2007)

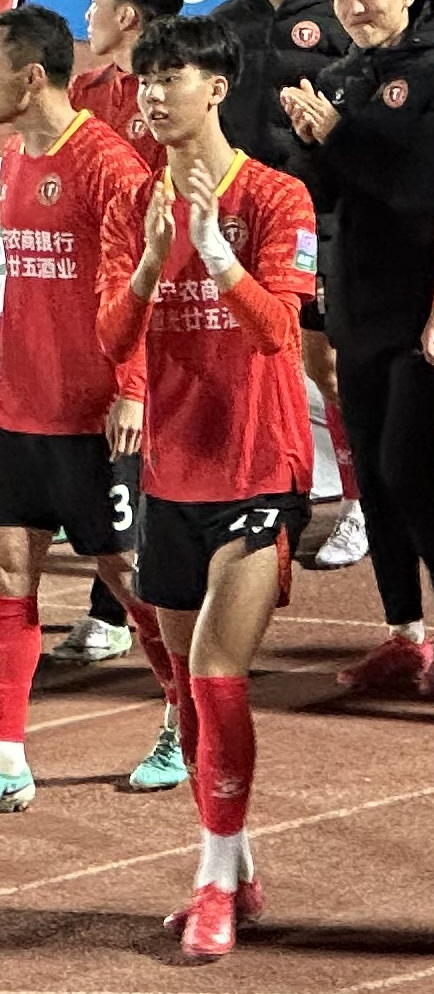
- Zhang Jiaming in April 2025

Personal information
- Full name: Zhang Jiaming
- Date of birth: 7 March 2007 (age 19)
- Place of birth: Shenyang, Liaoning, China
- Height: 1.88 m (6 ft 2 in)
- Positions: Forward; right-back

Team information
- Current team: Burnley

Youth career
- –2023: Liaoning Shenyang Urban

Senior career*
Years	Team	Apps	(Gls)
2023–2025	Liaoning Tieren	30	(3)
2026–	Burnley	0	(0)
2026	→ Voždovac (loan)	0	(0)
- * Club domestic league appearances and goals as of 27 July 2025

Zhang Jiaming (simplified Chinese: 张家鸣; traditional Chinese: 張家鳴; pinyin: Zhāng Jiāmíng; born 7 March 2007) is a Chinese professional footballer who plays as a forward or right-back for EFL Championship club Burnley.

In 2025, he was invited by German club Bayern Munich as part of their class of 2025 World Squad initiative.

== Club career ==
=== Early career ===
In 2017, Zhang Jiaming captained a tournament, playing with youth players of Shenyang Urban. In the tournament, he scored 22 goals in five matches. He was registered under the Shenyang FA.

=== Liaoning Tieren ===
In the 2023 summer player registration window, Zhang Jiaming was promoted to the first team of local China League One side Liaoning Shenyang Urban, and was given the number 37 shirt. On 21 October 2023, Zhang Jiaming made his debut for Liaoning Shenyang Urban in a 1–0 away loss to league winners Sichuan Jiuniu. On 19 May 2024, Zhang Jiaming scored his first two goals for Liaoning Tieren in a 2024 Chinese FA Cup tie against Ganzhou Ruishi, eventually losing on penalties after the match finished as a 2–2 draw. Two weeks later on 1 June 2024, Song Chen assisted Zhang to score his first league goal in a 2–2 draw with Qingdao Red Lions. He scored another goal the week after, assuring Liaoning Tieren's lead in the 80th minute in a 3–1 away league win over Guangzhou on 9 June. On 18 April 2025, Zhang provided a goal, as well as an assist for Zang Yifeng, in a 2–0 away win in the 2025 Chinese FA Cup against Lanzhou Longyuan Athletic. One month later on 31 May, he scored the only goal in a 1–0 home league win over Shijiazhuang Gongfu. With this goal, he became the first Liaoning Tieren player to score at the club's new long-term home ground, the Tiexi Stadium.

In June 2025, Zhang was invited by German side Bayern Munich as being part of their World Squad initiative. He scored two goals for Bayern Munich against Zhejiang U21.

=== Burnley ===
After the 2025 season, Zhang moved to England and joined Burnley. On 16 February 2026, Zhang was loaned out to Serbian First League club Voždovac.

== International career ==
In December 2024, he was selected by the Chinese Football Association to participate in a scouting camp for the 2007 age level.

== Personal life ==
Zhang Jiaming is the son of Chinese former international footballer Zhang Yonghai. In an interview in December 2024, he cited Marcus Rashford as his inspiration.

== Career statistics ==
=== Club ===
As of 31 May 2025

Appearances and goals by club, season, and competition
Club	Season	League			Cup		Continental		Other		Total	
Club	Season	Division	Apps	Goals	Apps	Goals	Apps	Goals	Apps	Goals	Apps	Goals
Liaoning Tieren	2023	China League One	2	0	0	0	–		–		2	0
Liaoning Tieren	2024	China League One	15	2	1	2	–		–		16	4
Liaoning Tieren	2025	China League One	8	1	2	1	–		–		10	2
Liaoning Tieren	Total		25	3	3	3	0	0	0	0	28	6
Career total			25	3	3	3	0	0	0	0	28	6

== Honours ==
Liaoning Tieren

- China League One: 2025
