= Lu Yongtao =

Chinese footballer (born 2000)

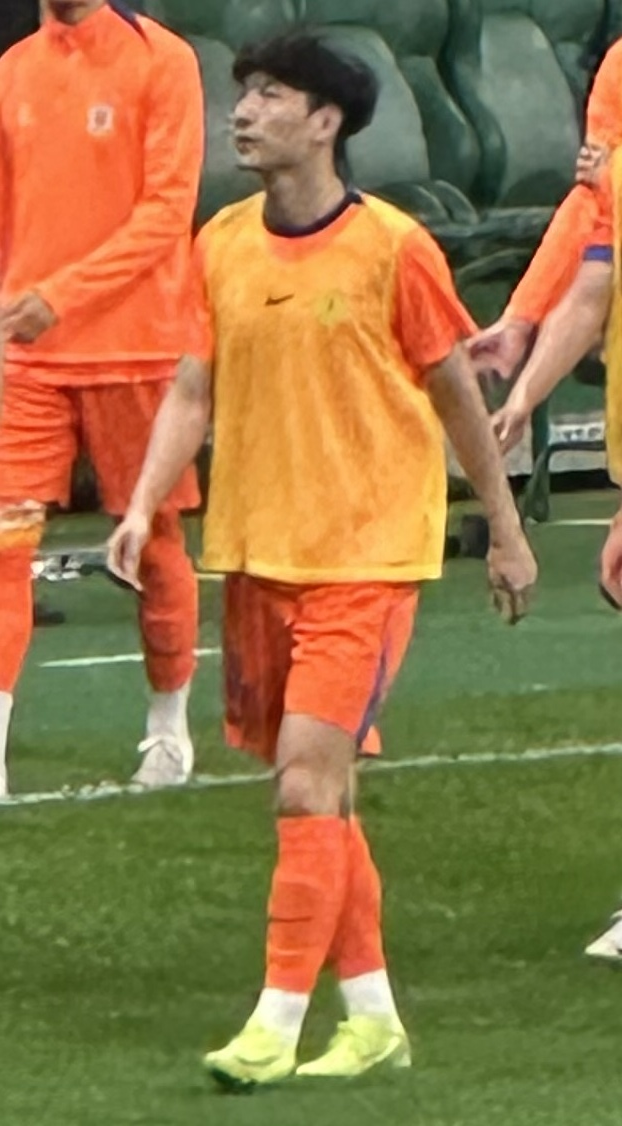
- Lu Yongtao in April 2025

Personal information
- Full name: Lu Yongtao
- Date of birth: 12 January 2000 (age 26)
- Place of birth: Jinan, Shandong, China
- Height: 1.86 m (6 ft 1 in)
- Position: Midfielder

Team information
- Current team: Shanghai Port
- Number: 38

Youth career
- 2015–2021: Shandong Taishan

Senior career*
Years	Team	Apps	(Gls)
2021–2025	Shandong Taishan	9	(0)
2021	→ Qingdao Youth Island (loan)	24	(7)
2022	→ Qingdao Youth Island (loan)	21	(3)
2023	→ Jinan Xingzhou (loan)	28	(1)
2024	→ Nantong Zhiyun (loan)	24	(4)
2025	→ Henan FC (loan)	9	(2)
2026–	Shanghai Port	15	(0)
- * Club domestic league appearances and goals as of 19 November 2026

Lu Yongtao (simplified Chinese: 卢永涛; traditional Chinese: 盧永濤; pinyin: Lú Yǒngtāo; born 12 January 2000) is a Chinese professional footballer who plays as a midfielder for Chinese Super League club Shanghai Port.

== Career ==
=== Shandong Taishan ===
Born in Jinan, Shandong, Lu Yongtao followed the youth academy of the local Shandong Luneng Taishan to train in Brazil for a year in 2015. Upon returning to China in 2016, he joined their academy officially. In 2019, Lu won a under-15 tournament with Shandong Taishan.

==== 2021 ====
On 12 April 2021, Lu was loaned out to China League Two club Qingdao Youth Island. On 15 May 2021, Lu made his senior and professional debut, and scored his first professional goal in a 2–2 draw with Sichuan Minzu. In the 2021 season, Lu scored a total of eight goals in 28 appearances in all competitions, and helped Qingdao Youth Island gain promotion to China League One.

==== 2022 ====
As Shandong Taishan sent a youth squad to the centralised venue of the 2022 AFC Champions League group stage to avoid the quarantining of their first-team players upon return to China due to the COVID-19 pandemic, Lu was named the captain of this Shandong side. On 24 April 2022, Lu scored Shandong's first goal of the tournament with a penalty kick in a 3–2 loss to Singaporean side Lion City Sailors. He started in all six games of the group stage. Before the 2022 league season, Lu Yongtao was named in the first-team squad list. He would earn no gametime with the first-team, and was sent back on loan to Qingdao Youth Island on 3 August. Lu scored two goals on 29 November in a 3–1 win over BIT, followed by another goal on 8 December in a 2–1 comeback win over Liaoning Shenyang Urban.

==== 2023 ====
On 21 April 2023, Lu joined newly-promoted China League One side Jinan Xingzhou on loan, choosing to wear the number 9 shirt. On 28 October 2023, Lu scored his first and only goal for the club in a 2–1 home league loss to Wuxi Wugo.

==== 2024 ====
On 21 February 2024, Lu was sent on loan to Chinese Super League club Nantong Zhiyun. He chose to wear the number 38 shirt. On 19 June, Lu scored his first goal for the club in a 3–1 away win over Ganzhou Ruishi in the 2024 Chinese FA Cup. On 25 June, he scored his first Chinese Super League goal in a 1–1 home draw with Tianjin Jinmen Tiger. For his performances in the month of July, Lu received Nantong Zhiyun's player of the month award. On 28 September, Lu completed a 3–2 home comeback win against Zhejiang with a goal in the 59th minute.

==== 2025 ====
Lu returned from loan to Shandong Taishan after three successive seasons, and was given the number 18 shirt. On 21 May 2025, Lu scored the fourth goal in a 5–0 away win over Qingdao Red Lions in the 2025 Chinese FA Cup as a substitute. On 18 July, Lu joined Chinese Super League club Henan FC on loan. He made his debut for Henan in the Chinese FA Cup quarter-final triumph against Shanghai Shenhua on 23 July, playing in extra-time and scoring a penalty in the penalty shoot-out. He scored his first and only two goals for Henan in the 5–2 victory over Wuhan Three Towns on 19 September.

==== 2026 ====
On 19 January 2026, Lu signed for defending Chinese Super League champions Shanghai Port.

== Career statistics ==
As of 22 November 2025

Appearances and goals by club, season, and competition
Club	Season	League			Cup		Continental		Other		Total	
Club	Season	Division	Apps	Goals	Apps	Goals	Apps	Goals	Apps	Goals	Apps	Goals
Qingdao Youth Island (loan)	2021	China League Two	24	7	2	1	–		2 (Note: Appearances in China League One relegation play-offs)	0	28	8
Shandong Taishan	2022	Chinese Super League	0	0	0	0	6 (Note: Appearances in AFC Champions League)	1	–		6	1
Shandong Taishan	2025	Chinese Super League	9	0	1	1	1 (Note: Appearances in AFC Champions League Elite)	0	–		11	1
Shandong Taishan	Total		9	0	1	1	7	1	0	0	17	2
Qingdao Youth Island (loan)	2022	China League One	21	3	0	0	–		–		21	3
Jinan Xingzhou (loan)	2023	China League One	28	1	1	0	–		–		29	1
Nantong Zhiyun (loan)	2024	Chinese Super League	24	4	2	1	–		–		26	5
Henan FC (loan)	2025	Chinese Super League	9	2	2	0	–		–		11	2
Career total			115	17	8	3	7	1	2	0	132	21
