= Wen Jialong =

Chinese association football player

Personal information
- Date of birth: 20 February 2001 (age 25)
- Place of birth: Meizhou, Guangdong, China
- Height: 1.78 m (5 ft 10 in)
- Position: Forward

Youth career
- 2011–2019: Hubei FA
- 2019–2020: Gondomar
- 2020: Hubei FA

Senior career*
Years	Team	Apps	(Gls)
2021–	Hubei Istar	53	(23)
2023–2024	→ Heilongjiang Ice City (loan)	11	(2)

International career
2017	China U16		
2019	China U19	3	(0)
- * Club domestic league appearances and goals

Wen Jialong (Chinese: 温家龙; born 20 February 2001) is a Chinese footballer who plays as a forward.

== Club career ==
=== Early career ===
Born in Meizhou in the Chinese province of Guangdong, Wen was introduced to football at a young age by his father and his friends, who would take him to local fields to play. It was through one of his father's friends that he enrolled with the Hubei Football Association, and he moved to Wuhan at the age of ten. In 2018, through a collaboration with Italian luxury fashion house Zegna, Wen was selected by then-national team manager Marcello Lippi to travel to Rome and train at the Reset Academy alongside compatriots Li Jiawei and Huang Zihao.

In Italy, Wen received one-to-one training, rather than training with the Italian players in the academy. The following year he moved to Portugal to join the academy of Gondomar. His stint with Gondomar got off to a good spell, and he contributed three goals and five assists in his first ten games for the under-19 team. However, due to the COVID-19 pandemic in Portugal, he was forced to return to China, re-joining the Hubei Football Association.

=== Hubei Istar ===
==== 2021–2022: Debut and National Games ====
In 2021 he joined China League Two club Hubei Istar. In September of the same year he represented Hubei at the 2021 National Games of China, helping his team to fourth place and scoring two goals. On his return to Hubei Istar he scored six goals in six games during the China League Two relegation stage, helping the club avoid relegation to the Chinese Champions League.

==== 2023–2024: Loans to Heilongjiang Ice City ====
Following a quiet 2022 campaign, Wen joined China League One club Heilongjiang Ice City on loan for the 2023 season. After just three appearances for Heilongjiang Ice City, the club agreed to keep him on loan for the 2024 season. Wen scored his first goal for Heilongjiang Ice City on 12 May 2024 in a China League One match against Liaoning Shenyang Urban; having come on as a half-time substitute for Yan Yu, he cut in from the left wing and beat two defenders, before curling a right-footed shot into the goal. His only other goal for Heilongjiang Ice City came on 5 October 2024, in a 5–1 defeat to Foshan Nanshi.

==== 2025–2026: Return to Hubei Istar ====
In 2025 he returned to Hubei Istar, and scored his first goal of the season on 11 May 2025 in a 3–0 win against the Beijing Institute of Technology. He followed this with a goal in Hubei's next match, a 4–2 win against Jiangxi Lushan on 15 May. He would only score once in the next five games - on 21 June in a 3–2 loss to Lanzhou Longyuan Athletic - before scoring in four consecutive games from 1 July to 13 July, against Hangzhou Linping Wuyue, Shanghai Port B, Tai'an Tiankuang and Wuxi Wugo.

Competing in the China League Two relegation stage again, Wen contributed two goals against Guangzhou Dandelion in Hubei Istar's first game as they won 3–1 on 24 August 2025. Wen scored a penalty against Guangdong Mingtu - the game's only goal as Hubei won 1–0 on 20 September, and goals against Quanzhou Yassin and Wenzhou Professional helped his side avoid relegation once more.

Having renewed his contract for the 2026 season, Wen's goal-scoring form would continue, and he established himself as one of Hubei Istar's key players. On 27 June 2026, after scoring early in the game, he was sent off after receiving two yellow cards in Hubei's 2–0 win against Guizhou Guiyang Athletic.

== International career ==
Wen was called up to the China under-16 squad in August 2017, having already featured at the 2017 Montaigu Tournament in April of the same year. In May 2019 he was called up to the China under-19 team for the 2019 Panda Cup.

== Career statistics ==
=== Club ===
Appearances and goals by club, season and competition
Club	Season	League			Cup (Note: Includes Chinese FA Cup)		Other		Total	
Club	Season	Division	Apps	Goals	Apps	Goals	Apps	Goals	Apps	Goals
Hubei Istar	2021	China League Two	2	0	0	0	6 (Note: Appearances in the China League Two relegation stage)	6	8	6
Hubei Istar	2022	China League Two	0	0	0	0	5	1	5	1
Hubei Istar	2023	China League Two	0	0	0	0	0	0	0	0
Hubei Istar	2024	China League Two	0	0	0	0	0	0	0	0
Hubei Istar	2025	China League Two	21	7	1	1	6	5	28	13
Hubei Istar	2026	China League Two	13	4	2	0	0	0	15	4
Hubei Istar	Total		36	11	3	1	17	12	56	24
Heilongjiang Ice City (loan)	2023	China League One	3	0	0	0	0	0	3	0
Heilongjiang Ice City (loan)	2024	China League One	8	2	1	0	0	0	9	2
Heilongjiang Ice City (loan)	Total		11	2	1	0	0	0	12	2
Career total			47	13	6	1	17	12	68	26
