= Zhou Dadi =

Chinese footballer

Zhou Dadi 周大地
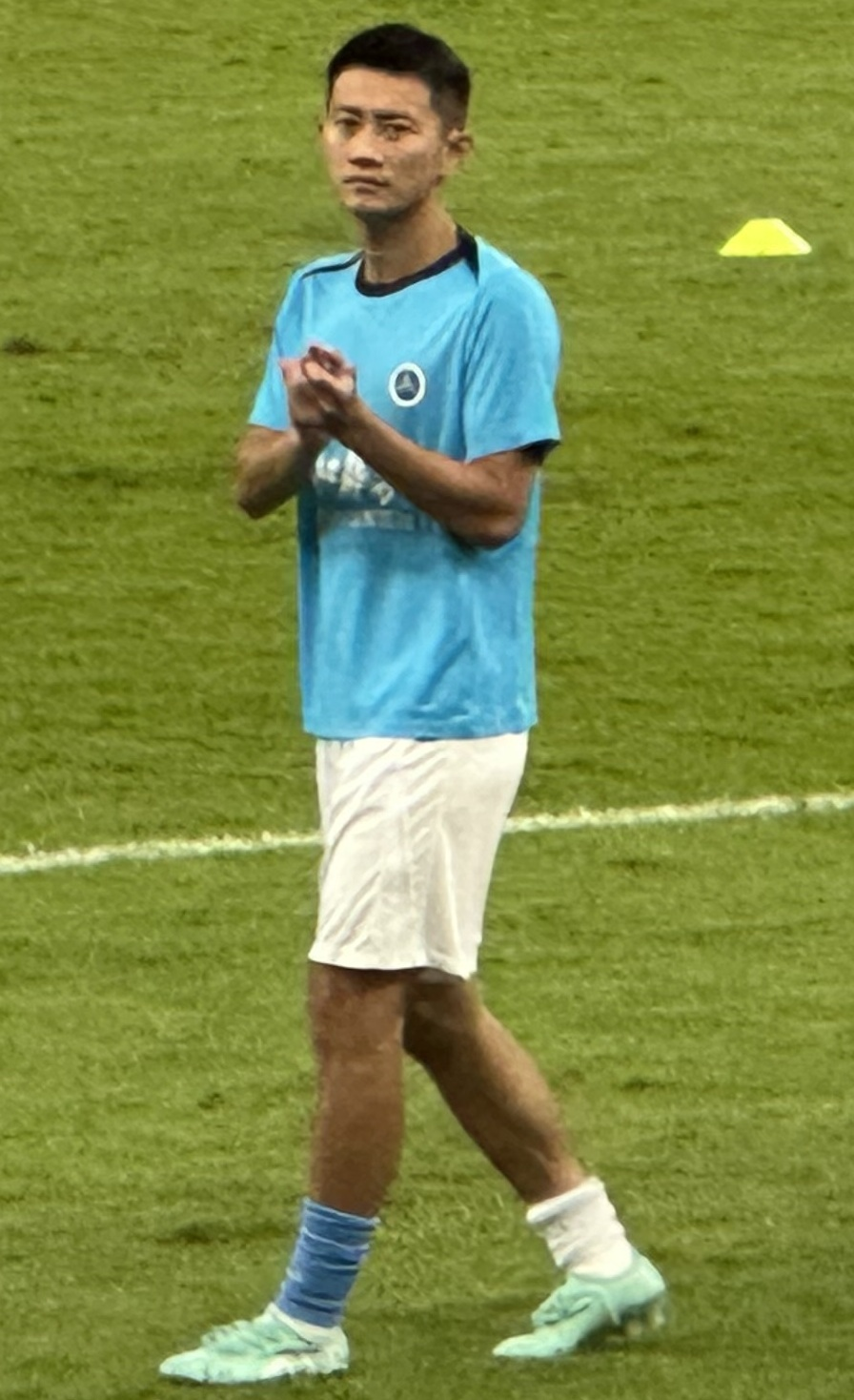
- Zhou Dadi in April 2025

Personal information
- Date of birth: 18 February 1996 (age 30)
- Place of birth: Kaifeng, Henan, China
- Height: 1.76 m (5 ft 9 in)
- Position: Midfielder

Team information
- Current team: Changchun Yatai
- Number: 37

Youth career
- 2006–2013: Changchun Yatai
- 2012–2013: → Casa Pia (loan)

Senior career*
Years	Team	Apps	(Gls)
2014–2021	Changchun Yatai	73	(1)
2021	→ Heilongjiang Ice City (loan)	12	(0)
2022–2024	Shenzhen Peng City	53	(2)
2025	Suzhou Dongwu	12	(1)
2026	Foshan Nanshi	11	(0)
2026–	Changchun Yatai	16	(1)

International career^{‡}
2014	China U19	8	(0)
2017	China U22	1	(0)
- * Club domestic league appearances and goals as of 8 March 2026 ‡ National team caps and goals as of 10 November 2017

Zhou Dadi (Chinese: 周大地; born 18 February 1996 in Lankao) is a Chinese professional footballer who plays for China League One club Changchun Yatai.

== Club career ==
Zhou Dadi joined Chinese Super League side Changchun Yatai's youth academy in 2006. He went to Portugal following Chinese Football Association 500.com Stars Project and joined Casa Pia youth team system in 2012. He was promoted to Changchun Yatai's first squad in July 2014. On 24 April 2016, he made his professional debut for Yatai in a 1-3 defeat against Shanghai SIPG at home, coming on as a substitute for Du Zhenyu in the 80th minute. On 15 August 2018, he scored his first senior goal in a 3–1 away win over Beijing Renhe.

On 20 July 2021, Zhou joined China League One club Heilongjiang Ice City on loan.

On 3 July 2026, Zhou returned to Changchun Yatai.

== Career statistics ==
Statistics accurate as of match played 31 December 2025.

Appearances and goals by club, season and competition
Club	Season	League			National Cup		Continental		Other		Total	
Club	Season	Division	Apps	Goals	Apps	Goals	Apps	Goals	Apps	Goals	Apps	Goals
Changchun Yatai	2014	Chinese Super League	0	0	0	0	–		–		0	0
Changchun Yatai	2015	Chinese Super League	0	0	0	0	–		–		0	0
Changchun Yatai	2016	Chinese Super League	4	0	1	0	–		–		5	0
Changchun Yatai	2017	Chinese Super League	18	0	1	0	–		–		19	0
Changchun Yatai	2018	Chinese Super League	22	1	1	0	–		–		23	1
Changchun Yatai	2019	China League One	21	0	2	0	–		–		23	0
Changchun Yatai	2020	China League One	8	0	2	0	–		–		10	0
Changchun Yatai	2021	Chinese Super League	0	0	–		–		–		0	0
Changchun Yatai	Total		73	1	7	0	0	0	0	0	80	1
Heilongjiang Ice City (loan)	2021	China League One	12	0	0	0	–		–		12	0
Sichuan Jiuniu/ Shenzhen Peng City	2022	China League One	26	2	1	1	–		–		27	3
Sichuan Jiuniu/ Shenzhen Peng City	2023	China League One	15	0	2	0	–		–		17	0
Sichuan Jiuniu/ Shenzhen Peng City	2024	Chinese Super League	7	0	1	0	–		–		8	0
Sichuan Jiuniu/ Shenzhen Peng City	2025	Chinese Super League	5	0	1	1	–		–		6	1
Sichuan Jiuniu/ Shenzhen Peng City	Total		53	2	5	2	0	0	0	0	58	4
Suzhou Dongwu	2025	China League One	12	1	–		–		–		12	1
Career total			150	4	12	2	0	0	0	0	162	6

== Honours ==
Changchun Yatai

- China League One: 2020
