= Wang Zhenghao =

Chinese association football player (born 2000)

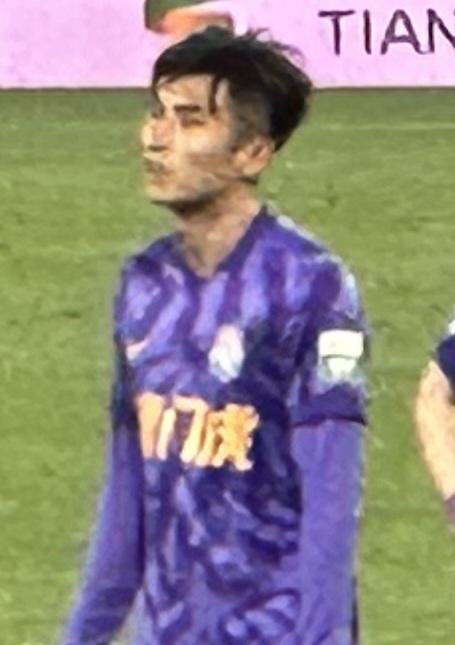
- Wang Zhenghao in April 2025

Personal information
- Date of birth: 28 June 2000 (age 26)
- Place of birth: Tianjin, China
- Height: 1.85 m (6 ft 1 in)
- Position: Defender

Team information
- Current team: Tianjin Jinmen Tiger
- Number: 3

Senior career*
Years	Team	Apps	(Gls)
2019–	Tianjin Jinmen Tiger	62	(1)
- * Club domestic league appearances and goals as of 22 November 2026

Wang Zhenghao (Chinese: 王政豪; born 28 June 2000) is a Chinese professional footballer who plays as a defender for Tianjin Jinmen Tiger.

== Club career ==
Wang Zhenghao would be promoted to the senior team of Tianjin TEDA (later renamed as Tianjin Jinmen Tiger) within the 2019 Chinese Super League season and would make his debut in league game on 3 March 2019 against Jiangsu Suning F.C. in a 3–2 defeat.

== Career statistics ==
As of 27 May 2026.

Appearances and goals by club, season and competition
Club	Season	League			National Cup		Continental		Other		Total	
Club	Season	Division	Apps	Goals	Apps	Goals	Apps	Goals	Apps	Goals	Apps	Goals
Tianjin TEDA/ Tianjin Jinmen Tiger	2019	Chinese Super League	2	0	0	0	–		–		2	0
Tianjin TEDA/ Tianjin Jinmen Tiger	2020	Chinese Super League	0	0	1	0	–		–		1	0
Tianjin TEDA/ Tianjin Jinmen Tiger	2021	Chinese Super League	2	0	2	0	–		–		4	0
Tianjin TEDA/ Tianjin Jinmen Tiger	2022	Chinese Super League	13	1	1	0	–		–		14	1
Tianjin TEDA/ Tianjin Jinmen Tiger	2023	Chinese Super League	3	0	0	0	–		–		3	0
Tianjin TEDA/ Tianjin Jinmen Tiger	2024	Chinese Super League	15	0	1	0	–		–		16	0
Tianjin TEDA/ Tianjin Jinmen Tiger	2025	Chinese Super League	8	0	2	1	–		–		10	1
Tianjin TEDA/ Tianjin Jinmen Tiger	2026	Chinese Super League	9	0	0	0	–		–		9	0
Tianjin TEDA/ Tianjin Jinmen Tiger	Total		52	1	7	1	0	0	0	0	59	2
Career total			52	1	7	1	0	0	0	0	59	2
