= Zheng Jiacheng =

Belgian footballer (born 2005)

Personal information
- Date of birth: 10 February 2005 (age 21)
- Place of birth: Mouscron, Belgium
- Position: Defender

Team information
- Current team: Liaoning Tieren
- Number: 37

Youth career
- –2023: KV Kortrijk
- 2023: NK Inker Zaprešić
- 2023–2025: Union SG

Senior career*
Years	Team	Apps	(Gls)
2023–2024	Union SG B	7	(0)
2026–	Liaoning Tieren	0	(0)
- * Club domestic league appearances and goals

Zheng Jiacheng (Chinese: 郑家骋; born 10 February 2005) is a Belgian professional footballer who plays as a defender for Liaoning Tieren.

== Early life ==
Zheng was born on 10 February 2005. Born in Mouscron, Belgium, he is of Chinese descent through his parents.

== Career ==
As a youth player, Zheng joined the youth academy of Belgian side KV Kortrijk. Following his stint there, he joined the youth academy of Croatian side NK Inker Zaprešić in 2023.

During the summer of 2023, he joined the youth academy of Belgian side Royale Union Saint-Gilloise and was promoted to the club's reserve team the same year, where he made seven league appearances and scored zero goals. Ahead of the 2026 season, he signed for Chinese side Liaoning Tieren.

== Style of play ==
Zheng plays as a defender. Chinese news website Sohu wrote in 2025 that he "demonstrated excellent adaptability and versatility, capable of playing in multiple positions such as right-back, winger, and even striker".
