= Zhao Chenwei =

Chinese footballer

Personal information
- Full name: 肇宸惟
- Date of birth: 29 June 2007 (age 19)
- Place of birth: Shenyang, Liaoning, China
- Height: 1.90 m (6 ft 3 in)
- Positions: Midfielder; forward

Team information
- Current team: Shijiazhuang Gongfu
- Number: 15

Senior career*
Years	Team	Apps	(Gls)
2025	Guangdong Mingtu	15	(3)
2026–	Shijiazhuang Gongfu	14	(1)

International career^{‡}
2026–	China U19		
- * Club domestic league appearances and goals as of 23 September 2026 ‡ National team caps and goals as of 23 September 2026

Zhao Chenwei (Chinese: 肇宸惟; pinyin: Zhào Chénwéi; born 29 June 2007) is a Chinese professional footballer who plays as a midfielder or forward for China League One club Shijiazhuang Gongfu.

== Early life and youth career ==
Zhao Chenwei was born on 29 June 2007. He is the son of former China national team captain Zhao Junzhe.

In August 2014, at the age of seven, Zhao scored 12 goals in six matches to win the golden boot at a national youth invitation tournament in Jinzhou. In April 2015, he became the first student of the Real Madrid Foundation's youth training camp in China. In August 2016, he appeared as a striker for his school team at the Gothia Cup (China).

In July 2019, Zhao captained the Shenyang Hebei No. 2 Primary School team to win the Liaoning Youth Super League U12 championship and was the top scorer with 15 goals. In 2023, he represented the Guangdong representative team and won the championship at the National Student (Youth) Games. In the same year, he was featured in a China Youth Daily article about student-athletes.

In December 2024, Zhao was named in the Chinese Football Association's 2024 second-phase elite player training camp for the 2007 age group, held in Haikou. In 2025, he won the bronze medal with the Guangdong U18 team at the National Games of China, providing two assists in the third-place match against Jiangsu.

== Club career ==
=== Guangdong Mingtu ===
In the 2025 winter transfer window, the 18-year-old Zhao joined China League Two club Guangdong Mingtu. The club was assembled around the Guangdong U18 National Games squad and also signed several other young players. He made his professional debut on 23 March 2025, coming on as a substitute in the 75th minute in a 0–1 home loss to Shenzhen 2028. On 13 May 2025, he scored the opening goal in a 2–0 home victory against Ganzhou Ruishi. On 25 May 2025, he scored a penalty in a 1–1 draw against Guangxi Lanhang. During the 2025 season, he made 15 appearances, scoring 3 goals and providing 1 assist.

=== Shijiazhuang Gongfu ===
On 9 February 2026, China League One club Shijiazhuang Gongfu officially announced the signing of Zhao Chenwei. He was assigned the squad number 15. He made his debut for the club in the 2026 season. On 27 June 2026, he played in a 2–1 home victory against Nanjing City. On 6 September 2026, he scored his first China League One goal in a 1–0 away victory against Guangxi Hengchen. By 18 September 2026, he had made 15 league appearances for the club, scoring 1 goal and providing 2 assists.

== International career ==
On 18 September 2026, Zhao Chenwei was named in the China U19 national team squad for a training camp held from 20 September to 5 October 2026 at the National Football Training Base, as part of preparations for the 2027 AFC U-20 Asian Cup. This was his return to the national team setup after two years.

== Career statistics ==
=== Club ===
As of 23 September 2026

Appearances and goals by club, season and competition
Club	Season	League			National Cup		Continental		Other		Total	
Club	Season	Division	Apps	Goals	Apps	Goals	Apps	Goals	Apps	Goals	Apps	Goals
Guangdong Mingtu	2025	China League Two	14	3	1	0	—		—		15	3
Shijiazhuang Gongfu	2026	China League One	14	1	0	0	—		—		14	1
Career total			28	4	0	0	0	0	0	0	29	4

== Honours ==
Guangdong

- National Student (Youth) Games: 2023
- National Games of China U18 bronze medal: 2025
