= Liu Chengyu =

Chinese businessman

- Born: Liu Chengyu; 1961 or 1962 (age 63–64)
- Known for: Founder and chairman of Shenzhen Kstar Science and Technology

Liu Chengyu (born 1961/1962) is a Chinese businessman and billionaire who founded solar power supply equipment manufacturer Shenzhen Kstar Science and Technology.

He lives in Shenzhen, China.

Forbes lists his net worth as of June 2023 at $1.7 billion USD.
