= Lucas Maia =

Brazilian association football player

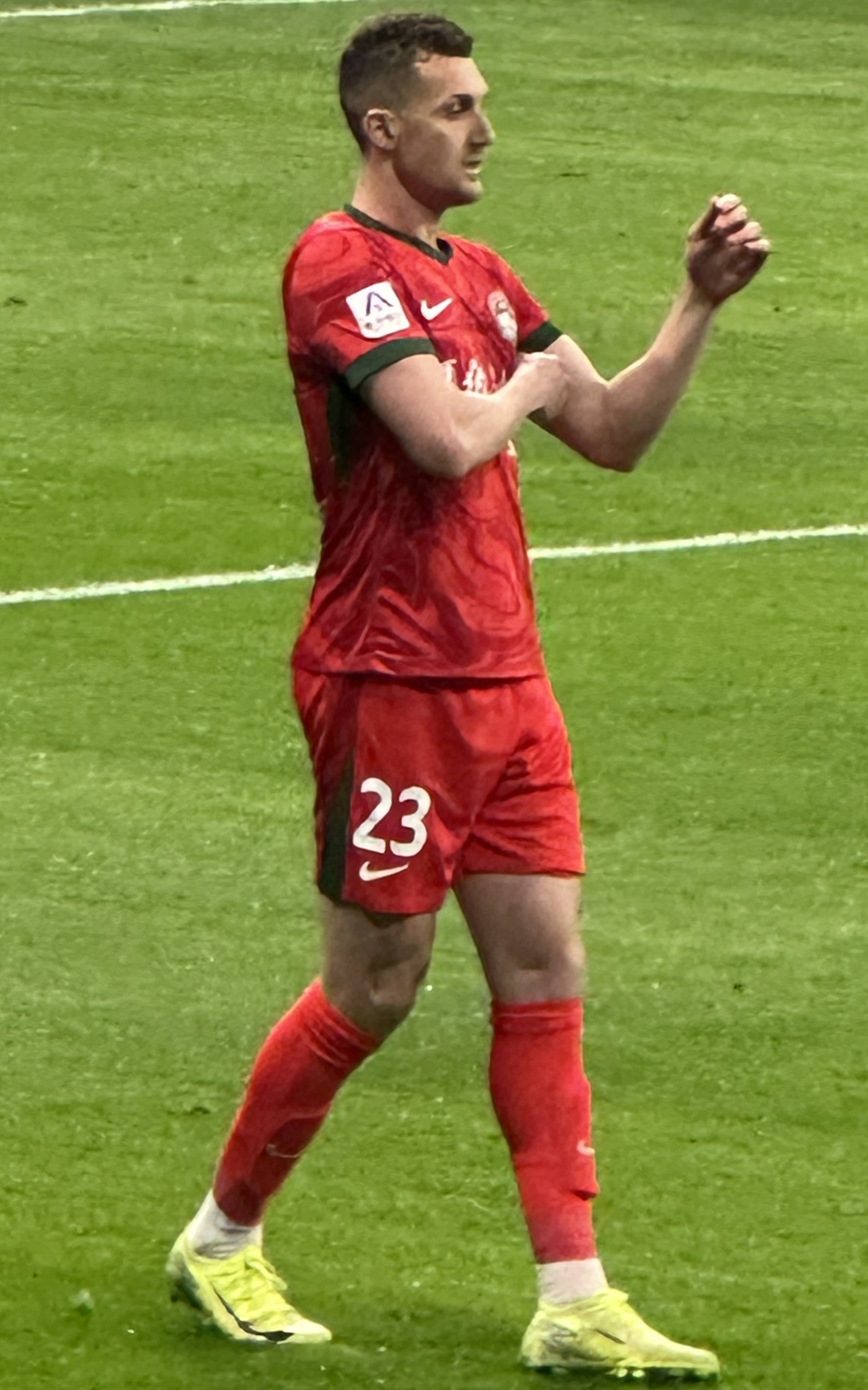
- Maia in April 2025

Personal information
- Full name: Lucas Jaques Varone Maia
- Date of birth: 23 February 1993 (age 33)
- Place of birth: Porto Alegre, Brazil
- Height: 1.92 m (6 ft 4 in)
- Positions: Centre-back; left-back

Team information
- Current team: Henan FC
- Number: 23

Youth career
- –2013: Resende

Senior career*
Years	Team	Apps	(Gls)
2013–2016	Resende	10	(1)
2016–2017	Vejle	26	(1)
2017–2018	Birkirkara	15	(0)
2019	Resende	11	(0)
2019	São José	13	(2)
2020	Cafetaleros de Chiapas	7	(0)
2020	Cancún	13	(1)
2021	→ Puebla (loan)	8	(0)
2021–2023	Puebla	67	(3)
2023–2024	Paysandu	29	(2)
2025–	Henan FC	56	(9)
- * Club domestic league appearances and goals as of 16 October 2026

Lucas Jaques Varone Maia (born 23 February 1993) is a Brazilian professional footballer who plays as a centre-back or left-back for Henan FC.

== Career ==
After starting his career at Resende, Maia had spells in Denmark and Malta before making his professional debut in June 2019 for Campeonato Brasileiro Série C side São José. In January 2020, Maia joined Ascenso MX side Cafetaleros de Chiapas. In June 2020, it was announced he would join the newly formed Liga de Expansión MX side Cancún. In December 2020, Maia joined Liga MX side Puebla on a six-month loan deal. On 27 May 2021, Maia signed a permanent deal with Puebla, agreeing a contract until 2024. In December 2023, he was signed by Paysandu for the 2024 season. In January 2025, Maia joined Chinese Super League side Henan FC.

== Career statistics ==
As of match played 16 October 2026

Appearances and goals by club, season and competition
Club	Season	League			State league		National cup (Note: Includes Copa do Brasil, Danish Cup, Maltese FA Trophy, Copa MX)		Other		Total	
Club	Season	Division	Apps	Goals	Apps	Goals	Apps	Goals	Apps	Goals	Apps	Goals
Resende	2013	Série D	3	0	0	0	0	0	—		3	0
Resende	2014	—			7 (Note: Appearance(s) in Campeonato Carioca)	1	2	0	—		9	1
Resende	2015	Série D	7	1	6	0	0	0	—		13	1
Resende	2016	—			3	0	1	0	—		4	0
Resende	Total		10	1	16	1	3	0	—		29	2
Vejle	2016-17	Danish 1st Division	26	1	—		0	0	—		26	1
Birkirkara	2017-18	Maltese Premier League	15	0	—		1	0	—		16	0
Resende	2019	—			11	1	0	0	—		11	1
São José	2019	Série C	13	2	0	0	—		—		13	2
Cafetaleros de Chiapas	2019–20	Ascenso MX	7	0	—		2	1	—		9	1
Cancún	2020–21	Liga de Expansión MX	13	1	—		0	0	—		13	1
Puebla (loan)	2020–21	Liga MX	8	0	—		0	0	—		8	0
Puebla	2021–22	Liga MX	34	2	—		0	0	—		34	2
Puebla	2022–23	Liga MX	25	1	—		0	0	—		25	1
Puebla	Total		59	3	—		0	0	—		59	3
Paysandu	2024	Série B	29	2	0	0	2	0	6 (Note: Appearance(s) in Copa Verde)	0	37	2
Henan FC	2025	Chinese Super League	28	6	—		4	0	—		32	6
Henan FC	2026	Chinese Super League	28	3	—		1	0	—		29	3
Henan FC	Total		56	9	—		5	0	—		61	9
Career total			236	19	27	2	13	1	6	0	282	22

== Honours ==
Paysandu

- Campeonato Paraense: 2024
- Copa Verde: 2024
