= Zhong Wenze =

Chinese footballer

Personal information
- Date of birth: 3 October 2007 (age 19)
- Place of birth: Shenzhen, Guangdong, China
- Height: 1.70 m (5 ft 7 in)
- Positions: Defender; winger

Team information
- Current team: Guangdong Mingtu
- Number: 52

Youth career
- Shenzhen Chaoxiang Darong

Senior career*
Years	Team	Apps	(Gls)
2024–	Guangdong Mingtu	51	(7)

International career^{‡}
2025–	China U19		
- * Club domestic league appearances and goals as of 16 October 2026 ‡ National team caps and goals as of 16 October 2026

Zhong Wenze (simplified Chinese: 钟文泽; traditional Chinese: 鍾文澤; pinyin: Zhōng Wénzé; born 3 October 2007) is a Chinese professional footballer who plays as a defender or winger for China League Two club Guangdong Mingtu.

== Early life and youth career ==
Zhong Wenze was born on 3 October 2007. He began playing football at the age of three, following his father, who was a coach, onto the pitch. He attended Huanggang Primary School, where he earned the nickname "Campus Little Ball King" in school leagues. He later joined the youth academy of Shenzhen Chaoxiang Darong Football Club.

In 2017, Zhong represented the Guangdong team at the Chinese Football Association Youth (U10) Men's Football Tournament, winning the national championship and being selected for the tournament's best squad. In the same year, he was named the best player in the U11 category at the second Chenguang Shenzhen Cup and was selected for the 2017 National U10 Best Squad. In 2018, he scored twice in a group stage match of the Saint-Anne U11 International Football Tournament in France, helping his team advance to the quarter-finals as the group winner.

Zhong later entered Shenzhen Experimental School, where he received systematic training in the school team's youth ranks at the age of 15. In 2023, he was selected for the Guangdong provincial team and participated in training for the U18 team in preparation for the 15th National Games.

== Club career ==
=== Guangdong Mingtu ===
In the 2025 season, Zhong played for Guangdong Mingtu in the China League Two. He made 25 appearances and scored 3 goals, establishing himself as the team's starting left-back. On 13 May 2025, he scored in a 2–0 victory over Ganzhou Ruishi. On 14 June 2025, he scored in a 3–2 win against Guizhou Zhucheng Athletic. On 19 June 2026, he scored in a 2–0 away win against Ganzhou Ruishi in the 12th round of the 2026 China League Two. On 11 October 2026, he scored the winning goal in the 87th minute of a 2–1 victory over Lanzhou Longyuan Athletic.

== International career ==
In August 2025, Zhong was called up to the China U18 national team for a training camp in preparation for the 2026 U20 Asian Cup qualifiers. In September 2025, he started as a left-back in a 4–0 friendly victory over Myanmar. In January 2026, he was called up to the China U19 national team for a training camp in Zhaoqing.

== Career statistics ==
=== Club ===
As of 16 October 2026

Appearances and goals by club, season and competition
Club	Season	League			National Cup		Continental		Other		Total	
Club	Season	Division	Apps	Goals	Apps	Goals	Apps	Goals	Apps	Goals	Apps	Goals
Guangdong Mingtu	2025	China League Two	25	4	0	0	—		—		25	4
Guangdong Mingtu	2026	China League Two	26	3	0	0	—		—		26	3
Career total			51	4	0	0	0	0	0	0	51	7
