= Xu Dong =

Chinese footballer

Xu Dong 许东
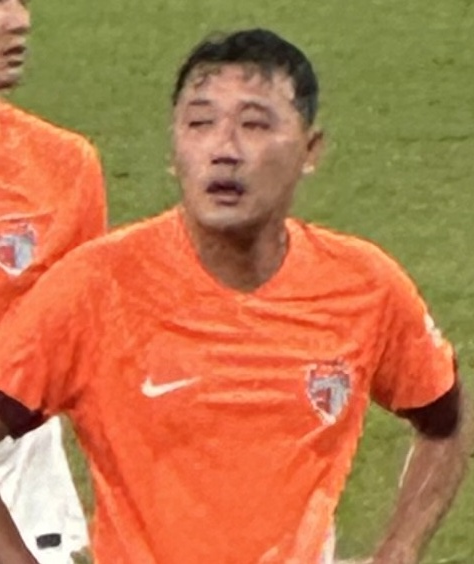
- Xu Dong in August 2024

Personal information
- Date of birth: 17 February 1991 (age 35)
- Place of birth: Dalian, Liaoning, China
- Height: 1.83 m (6 ft 0 in)
- Position: Left-back

Team information
- Current team: Liaoning Tieren
- Number: 28

Senior career*
| Years | Team | Apps | (Gls) |
| 2010 | Liaoning Tiger | ? | (?) |
| 2011–2014 | Harbin Yiteng | 92 | (5) |
| 2015–2017 | Beijing Enterprises | 67 | (1) |
| 2018–2021 | Heilongjiang Lava Spring | 85 | (1) |
| 2022 | Wuhan Yangtze River | 28 | (3) |
| 2023–2024 | Qingdao Hainiu | 52 | (2) |
| 2025– | Liaoning Tieren | 37 | (0) |
- * Club domestic league appearances and goals as of 22 November 2026

Xu Dong (Chinese: 许东; born 17 February 1991 in Dalian) is a Chinese football player who currently plays for Liaoning Tieren in the Chinese Super League.

== Club career ==
In 2010, Xu Dong started his professional footballer career with Liaoning Tiger in the China League Two division. In February 2011, Xu transferred to another China League Two side with Harbin Yiteng. In his first season with the club he would quickly establish himself as a vital member of the squad and went on to win the 2011 China League Two division title with them. This was soon followed by promotion to the top tier at the end of the 2013 league season. He would make his Chinese Super League debut for Harbin on 7 March 2014 in a game against Shandong Luneng Taishan in a 1–0 defeat.

In February 2015, Xu transferred to China League One side Beijing Enterprises. In February 2018, Xu transferred to Heilongjiang Lava Spring.

On 13 January 2025, Xu joined China League One club Liaoning Tieren.

== Career statistics ==
Statistics accurate as of match played 31 December 2023.

Appearances and goals by club, season and competition
| Club | Season | League | | | National Cup | | Continental | | Other | | Total | |
| Club | Season | Division | Apps | Goals | Apps | Goals | Apps | Goals | Apps | Goals | Apps | Goals |
|---|---|---|---|---|---|---|---|---|---|---|---|---|
| Liaoning Tiger | 2010 | China League Two | | | - | | - | | - | | | |
| Harbin Yiteng | 2011 | China League Two | 19 | 1 | - | | - | | - | | 19 | 1 |
| Harbin Yiteng | 2012 | China League One | 28 | 3 | 1 | 0 | - | | - | | 29 | 3 |
| Harbin Yiteng | 2013 | China League One | 26 | 0 | 1 | 0 | - | | - | | 27 | 0 |
| Harbin Yiteng | 2014 | Chinese Super League | 19 | 1 | 0 | 0 | - | | - | | 19 | 1 |
| Harbin Yiteng | Total | | 92 | 5 | 2 | 0 | 0 | 0 | 0 | 0 | 94 | 5 |
| Beijing Enterprises | 2015 | China League One | 23 | 1 | 5 | 0 | - | | - | | 28 | 1 |
| Beijing Enterprises | 2016 | China League One | 27 | 0 | 0 | 0 | - | | - | | 27 | 0 |
| Beijing Enterprises | 2017 | China League One | 17 | 0 | 1 | 0 | - | | - | | 18 | 0 |
| Beijing Enterprises | Total | | 67 | 1 | 6 | 0 | 0 | 0 | 0 | 0 | 98 | 4 |
| Heilongjiang Lava Spring | 2018 | China League One | 22 | 0 | 0 | 0 | - | | - | | 22 | 0 |
| Heilongjiang Lava Spring | 2019 | China League One | 27 | 1 | 0 | 0 | - | | - | | 27 | 1 |
| Heilongjiang Lava Spring | 2020 | China League One | 15 | 0 | - | | - | | 2 (Note: Appearances in China League One relegation play-offs) | 0 | 17 | 0 |
| Heilongjiang Lava Spring | 2021 | China League One | 19 | 1 | 0 | 0 | - | | - | | 19 | 1 |
| Heilongjiang Lava Spring | Total | | 83 | 2 | 0 | 0 | 0 | 0 | 2 | 0 | 85 | 2 |
| Wuhan Yangtze River | 2022 | Chinese Super League | 28 | 3 | 0 | 0 | - | | - | | 28 | 3 |
| Qingdao Hainiu | 2023 | Chinese Super League | 26 | 1 | 1 | 0 | - | | - | | 27 | 1 |
| Career total | | | 296 | 12 | 9 | 0 | 0 | 0 | 2 | 0 | 307 | 12 |

== Honours ==
=== Club ===
Harbin Yiteng

- China League Two: 2011

Liaoning Tieren

- China League One: 2025
