= Wang Tianqing =

Chinese association football player

Personal information
- Date of birth: 1 April 2001 (age 25)
- Place of birth: Hefei, Anhui, China
- Height: 1.75 m (5 ft 9 in)
- Position: Defender

Youth career
- –2020: Guangzhou Evergrande

Senior career*
Years	Team	Apps	(Gls)
2020–2022	Guangzhou FC		
2023	Dandong Tengyue		
2023–2024	Jiangxi Dark Horse Junior	36	(0)
2025	Guangxi Hengchen	0	(0)
- * Club domestic league appearances and goals as of 14:01, 15 January 2022 (UTC)

Wang Tianqing (Chinese: 王天擎; born 1 April 2001) is a Chinese footballer currently playing as a defender.

== Career statistics ==
=== Club ===
As of 15 January 2022.

Club	Season	League			Cup		Continental		Other		Total	
Club	Season	Division	Apps	Goals	Apps	Goals	Apps	Goals	Apps	Goals	Apps	Goals
Guangzhou FC	2020	Chinese Super League	0	0	1 (Note: Appearances in the Chinese FA Cup)	0	0	0	0	0	1	0
Guangzhou FC	2021	Chinese Super League	0	0	1	0	6 (Note: Appearances in the AFC Champions League)	0	0	0	7	0
Career total			0	0	2	0	6	0	0	0	8	0
