= Gao Yunpeng =

Chinese association football player

Gao Yunpeng 高云鹏
Personal information
- Date of birth: 1 November 1999 (age 27)
- Place of birth: China
- Height: 1.87 m (6 ft 2 in)
- Position: Defender

Team information
- Current team: Shanxi Chongde Ronghai

Youth career
- –2019: Beijing Guoan
- 2019–2021: Hebei FC

Senior career*
Years	Team	Apps	(Gls)
2021–2022	Beijing BSU	20	(0)
2024–2025	Henan FC	0	(0)
2024	→ Tai'an Tiankuang (loan)	3	(0)
2025	→ Yanbian Longding (loan)	0	(0)
2026–	Shanxi Chongde Ronghai	0	(0)
- * Club domestic league appearances and goals as of 14:01, 24 August 2021 (UTC)

Gao Yunpeng (simplified Chinese: 高云鹏; traditional Chinese: 高雲鵬; born 1 November 1999) is a Chinese footballer currently playing as a defender for Shanxi Chongde Ronghai.

== Career statistics ==
=== Club ===
As of 24 August 2021.

Club	Season	League			Cup		Other		Total	
Club	Season	Division	Apps	Goals	Apps	Goals	Apps	Goals	Apps	Goals
Beijing BSU	2021	China League One	3	0	1 (Note: Appearances in the Chinese FA Cup)	0	0	0	4	0
Career total			3	0	1	0	0	0	4	0
