= Zhang Huajun =

Chinese footballer

Zhang Huajun 张华峻
Personal information
- Full name: Zhang Huajun
- Date of birth: 1 October 2002 (age 24)
- Place of birth: Shenyang, Liaoning, China
- Height: 1.85 m (6 ft 1 in)
- Position: Midfielder

Team information
- Current team: Guangxi Hengchen
- Number: 17

Senior career*
| Years | Team | Apps | (Gls) |
| 2022 | Wuhan Yangtze River | 31 | (1) |
| 2023 | Nanjing City | 6 | (0) |
| 2024 | Guangxi Pingguo Haliao | 3 | (0) |
| 2024 | → Guangxi Hengchen (loan) | 11 | (1) |
| 2025– | Guangxi Hengchen | 28 | (6) |
- * Club domestic league appearances and goals as of 12 March 2023

Zhang Huajun (Chinese: 张华峻; pinyin: Zhāng Huájùn; born 1 October 2001) is a Chinese football player who is currently playing for China League One club Guangxi Hengchen.

== Early life and career ==
Born in 2002, Zhang studied in the High School Affiliated to Renmin University of China, participated in the Chinese High School Football Championship with the football team of the High School Affiliated to Renmin University, and was selected for the Chinese High School Football League to compete in the Asian High School U18 Football Championship and other events.

In 2021, Zhang Huajun represented Beijing in the National Middle School Games and won the runner-up, receiving the attention of many professional teams, joining the Hebei Zhuoao team in the second league in the 2021 season.

== Senior career ==
He made his debut against Shanghai Port F.C. on 4 June 2022, coming on as a substitute for Hu Rentian.

He scored his first goal against Henan Songshan Longmen F.C. on 21 August 2022.

Huajun played 62 minutes in Wuhan Yangtze's final ever league match, coming off for Pi Ziyang.

After Wuhan Yangtze's dissolution in 2023, Huajun was released from his contract.

== Style of play ==
Zhang is known for his corner kick ability.
