= Huang Zihao =

Chinese association football player

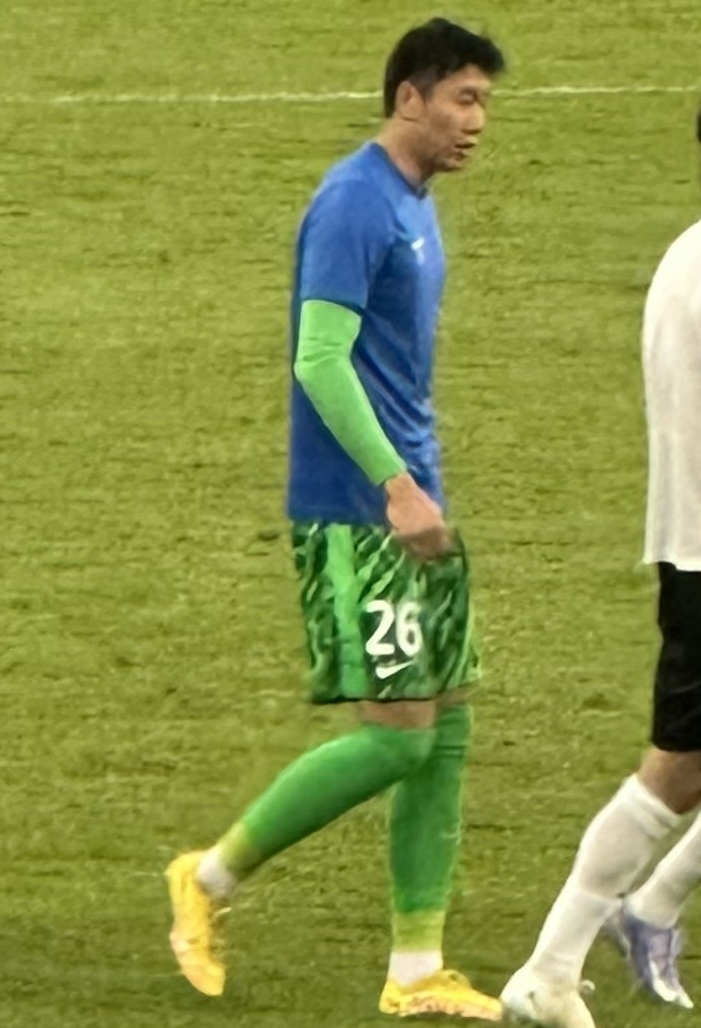
- Huang Zihao in April 2025

Personal information
- Date of birth: 9 June 2001 (age 25)
- Place of birth: Suqian, Jiangsu, China
- Height: 1.88 m (6 ft 2 in)
- Position: Goalkeeper

Team information
- Current team: Dalian Yingbo
- Number: 26

Youth career
- –2020: Jiangsu Suning

Senior career*
Years	Team	Apps	(Gls)
2020	Jiangsu Suning	0	(0)
2021–2024	Nanjing City	66	(0)
2025–	Dalian Yingbo	27	(0)

International career^{‡}
2019	China U18	2	(0)
2023–2024	China U23	3	(0)
Medal record
Representing China
Men's football
EAFF Championship
Bronze medal – third place	2022 Japan	Team
- * Club domestic league appearances and goals as of 19 November 2026 ‡ National team caps and goals as of 00:01, 25 December 2021 (UTC)

Huang Zihao (Chinese: 黄子豪; born 9 June 2001) is a Chinese footballer currently playing as a goalkeeper for Dalian Yingbo.

== Club career ==
On 16 January 2025, Huang Zihao signed for Chinese Super League club Dalian Yingbo. He was voted as the goalkeeper of the month in the month of July 2025.

== Career statistics ==
=== Club ===
As of 19 November 2026

Appearances and goals by club, season and competition
Club	Season	League			Cup		Other		Total	
Club	Season	Division	Apps	Goals	Apps	Goals	Apps	Goals	Apps	Goals
Jiangsu Suning	2020	Chinese Super League	0	0	1	0	–		1	0
Nanjing City	2021	China League One	32	0	0	0	–		32	0
Nanjing City	2022	China League One	11	0	1	0	–		12	0
Nanjing City	2023	China League One	18	0	0	0	–		18	0
Nanjing City	2024	China League One	5	0	1	0	–		6	0
Nanjing City	Total		66	0	2	0	0	0	68	0
Dalian Yingbo	2025	Chinese Super League	16	0	2	0	–		18	0
Dalian Yingbo	2026	Chinese Super League	11	0	3	0	–		14	0
Dalian Yingbo	Total		27	0	5	0	0	0	32	0
Career total			94	0	7	0	0	0	101	0

== Honours ==
Dalian Yingbo

- Chinese Super League: 2026
