= Zang Yifeng =

Chinese footballer

Zang Yifeng 臧一锋
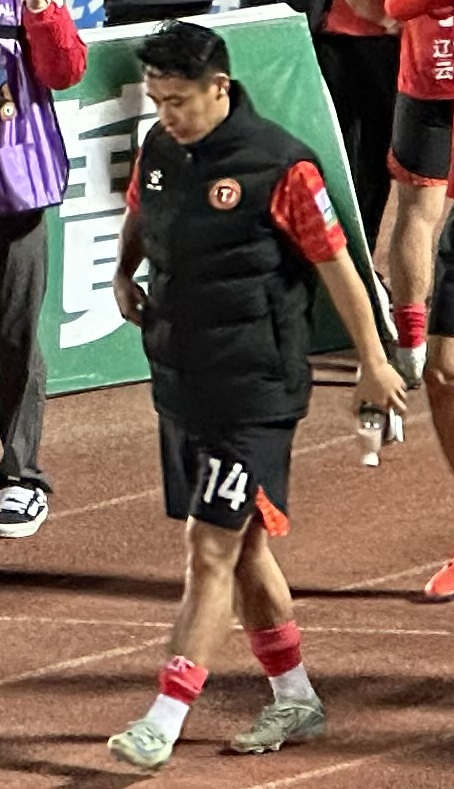
- Zang Yifeng in April 2025

Personal information
- Full name: Zang Yifeng
- Date of birth: 15 October 1993 (age 33)
- Place of birth: Guiyang, Guizhou, China
- Height: 1.77 m (5 ft 9 1/2 in)
- Position: Midfielder

Team information
- Current team: Liaoning Tieren
- Number: 14

Youth career
- 2001–2006: Shenzhen Yantian Sports School
- 2006–2012: Hangzhou Greentown

Senior career*
Years	Team	Apps	(Gls)
2011	Wenzhou Provenza	17	(7)
2012–2018	Hangzhou Greentown	61	(6)
2019–2023	Cangzhou Mighty Lions	61	(9)
2023–2024	Yunnan Yukun	38	(10)
2025–	Liaoning Tieren	46	(10)

International career
2015	China U22		
- * Club domestic league appearances and goals as of 22 November 2026

Zang Yifeng (Chinese: 臧一锋; born 15 October 1993) is a Chinese professional footballer who currently plays as a midfielder for Liaoning Tieren.

== Club career ==
Zang Yifeng joined Hangzhou Greentown youth team system from Shenzhen Yantian Sports School in 2006. Zang started his professional football career in 2011 when he was loaned to Wenzhou Provenza's squad for the 2011 China League Two campaign. He returned to Hangzhou Greentown reserved team squad in 2012 and made his Super League debut on 22 April 2012 against Tianjin Teda. He was promoted to the first team in the summer of 2012. Zang scored his first goal for Hangzhou on 20 July 2014, which ensured Hangzhou beat Changchun Yatai 3–2. Zang was demoted to the reserved team in the 2018 season.

On 22 February 2019, Zang transferred to fellow China League One side Shijiazhuang Ever Bright (now known as Cangzhou Mighty Lions). He would make his debut for the club on 16 March 2019 in a league game against Inner Mongolia Zhongyou in a 3-0 victory. In his first season with the club he would help the team to a runners-up position and promotion into the top tier.

== Career statistics ==
As of match played 27 June 2026.

Appearances and goals by club, season and competition
Club	Season	League			National Cup		Continental		Other		Total	
Club	Season	Division	Apps	Goals	Apps	Goals	Apps	Goals	Apps	Goals	Apps	Goals
Wenzhou Provenza	2011	China League Two	17	7	–		–		–		17	7
Hangzhou Greentown	2012	Chinese Super League	3	0	1	0	–		–		4	0
Hangzhou Greentown	2013	Chinese Super League	0	0	2	0	–		–		2	0
Hangzhou Greentown	2014	Chinese Super League	21	1	1	0	–		–		22	1
Hangzhou Greentown	2015	Chinese Super League	11	0	2	0	–		–		13	0
Hangzhou Greentown	2016	Chinese Super League	9	0	2	0	–		–		11	0
Hangzhou Greentown	2017	China League One	17	5	2	3	–		–		19	8
Hangzhou Greentown	Total		61	6	10	3	0	0	0	0	71	9
Shijiazhuang Ever Bright/ Cangzhou Mighty Lions	2019	China League One	18	3	1	0	–		–		19	3
Shijiazhuang Ever Bright/ Cangzhou Mighty Lions	2020	Chinese Super League	8	2	0	0	–		–		8	2
Shijiazhuang Ever Bright/ Cangzhou Mighty Lions	2021	Chinese Super League	18	1	1	0	–		–		19	1
Shijiazhuang Ever Bright/ Cangzhou Mighty Lions	2022	Chinese Super League	15	3	1	2	–		–		16	5
Shijiazhuang Ever Bright/ Cangzhou Mighty Lions	2023	Chinese Super League	2	0	1	0	–		–		3	0
Shijiazhuang Ever Bright/ Cangzhou Mighty Lions	Total		61	9	4	2	0	0	0	0	65	11
Yunnan Yukun	2023	China League Two	11	3	0	0	–		–		11	3
Yunnan Yukun	2024	China League One	27	7	1	0	–		–		28	7
Yunnan Yukun	Total		38	10	1	0	0	0	0	0	39	10
Liaoning Tieren	2025	China League One	29	10	2	1	–		–		31	11
Liaoning Tieren	2026	Chinese Super League	6	0	1	0	–		–		7	0
Liaoning Tieren	Total		35	10	3	1	0	0	0	0	38	11
Career total			212	42	18	6	0	0	0	0	230	48

== Honours ==
=== Club ===
Yunnan Yukun

- China League One: 2024.

Liaoning Tieren

- China League One: 2025.
