= 2025 Chinese Super League =

22nd season of the Chinese Super League

Chinese Super League
- Season: 2025
- Dates: 22 February – 22 November
- Champions: Shanghai Port (4th title)
- Relegated: Meizhou Hakka; Changchun Yatai
- Champions League Elite: Shanghai Port; Beijing Guoan
- Champions League Two: Shanghai Shenhua
- Matches: 240
- Goals: 771 (3.21 per match)
- Top goalscorer: Fábio Abreu (28 goals)
- Biggest home win: Shandong Taishan 6–0 Beijing Guoan (31 August)
- Biggest away win: Wuhan Three Towns 0–4 Zhejiang; Qingdao West Coast 1–5 Shandong Taishan
- Highest scoring: Wuhan Three Towns 4–4 Beijing Guoan (15 April)
- Longest winning run: Beijing Guoan; Chengdu Rongcheng (5 matches each)
- Longest unbeaten run: Beijing Guoan (16 matches)
- Longest winless run: Meizhou Hakka (11 matches)
- Longest losing run: Meizhou Hakka (7 matches)
- Highest attendance: 62,330; Dalian Yingbo 0–1 Shanghai Port (22 November 2025)
- Lowest attendance: 4,363; Qingdao West Coast 2–0 Wuhan Three Towns (3 March 2025)
- Total attendance: 6,181,090
- Average attendance: 25,755

The 2025 Chinese Super League, also known as the 2025 China Resources Beverage Chinese Football Super League (Chinese: 2025华润饮料中国足球超级联赛) for sponsorship reasons, was the 22nd season since the establishment of the Chinese Super League. Shanghai Port are the two-time defending champions.

== Clubs ==
=== Club changes ===
==== To Super League ====
**Clubs promoted from 2024 China League One**

- Yunnan Yukun
- Dalian Yingbo

==== From Super League ====
**Clubs relegated to 2025 China League One**

- Nantong Zhiyun

**Disqualified entries**

- ~~Cangzhou Mighty Lions~~

=== Stadiums and locations ===
Locations of the 2025 Chinese Super League teams

Team	City	Stadium	Capacity	2024 season
Shanghai Port	Shanghai (Pudong)	Pudong Football Stadium	37,000	1st
Shanghai Shenhua	Shanghai (Xuhui)	Shanghai Stadium	72,436	2nd
Chengdu Rongcheng	Chengdu	Phoenix Hill Football Stadium	50,695	3rd
Beijing Guoan	Beijing	Workers' Stadium	68,000	4th
Shandong Taishan	Jinan	Jinan Olympic Sports Center Stadium	56,808	5th
Tianjin Jinmen Tiger	Tianjin	TEDA Soccer Stadium	36,390	6th
Tianjin Jinmen Tiger	Tianjin	Tianjin Olympic Centre (Note: Tianjin Jinmen Tiger's home match on 22 November was rescheduled to take place at the Tianjin Olympic Centre.)	54,696	6th
Zhejiang	Hangzhou	Huanglong Sports Center Stadium	51,971	7th
Henan	Zhengzhou	Hanghai Stadium	29,860	8th
Changchun Yatai	Changchun	Changchun Stadium	41,638	9th
Qingdao West Coast	Qingdao (Huangdao)	Qingdao West Coast University City Sports Center	27,000	10th
Wuhan Three Towns	Wuhan	Wuhan Sports Center	56,201	11th
Qingdao Hainiu	Qingdao (Chengyang)	Qingdao Youth Football Stadium	50,000	12th
Shenzhen Peng City	Shenzhen	Shenzhen Sports Center Stadium	45,000	14th
Shenzhen Peng City	Shenzhen	Zhaoqing New District Sports Center Stadium (Zhaoqing) (Note: Shenzhen Peng City's home match, originally set to take place on 17 October in Shenzhen, was moved to take place in Zhaoqing on 18 October. Their home match on 22 November was also moved to take place in Zhaoqing.)	20,000	14th
Yunnan Yukun ^{P}	Yuxi	Yuxi Plateau Sports Center Stadium	30,300	CL1, 1st
Dalian Yingbo ^{P}	Dalian	Dalian Suoyuwan Football Stadium	63,671	CL1, 2nd
Meizhou Hakka	Wuhua	Huitang Stadium	27,000	15th

=== Personnel and kits ===
The design for every participating CSL club's home kits were unveiled by Nike on 15 January 2025.

Team	Manager	Captain	Kit manufacturer	Shirt sponsor (chest)
Beijing Guoan	(Spain) Ramiro Amarelle (caretaker)	(China) Zhang Xizhe	(United States) Nike (Note: All CSL teams use Nike as kit manufacturer.)	JD.com
Changchun Yatai	(Portugal) Ricardo Soares	(China) Tan Long	(United States) Nike	Yatai Building Materials
Chengdu Rongcheng	(South Korea) Seo Jung-won	(Chinese Taipei) Tim Chow	(United States) Nike	Chengdu Rongcheng; Chengdu Construction
Dalian Yingbo	(China) Li Guoxu	(China) Lü Peng	(United States) Nike	Xiwang
Henan	(Portugal) Daniel Ramos	(China) Wang Shangyuan	(United States) Nike	Jiuzu Dukang; HuaHuaNiu Milk Industry
Meizhou Hakka	(China) Qu Gang (caretaker)	(China) Liao Junjian	(United States) Nike	Xiwang
Qingdao Hainiu	(China) Li Xiaopeng	(China) Sha Yibo	(United States) Nike	Qingdao
Qingdao West Coast	(Germany) Reiner Maurer (caretaker)	(China) Sun Jie	(United States) Nike	Xihai'an New Area
Shandong Taishan	(China) Han Peng (caretaker)	(China) Wang Dalei	(United States) Nike	Shandong Taishan
Shanghai Port	(Australia) Kevin Muscat	(China) Wang Shenchao	(United States) Nike	Roewe
Shanghai Shenhua	(Russia) Leonid Slutsky	(China) Wu Xi	(United States) Nike	Bank of Communications
Shenzhen Peng City	(China) Chen Tao (caretaker)	(Serbia) Rade Dugalić	(United States) Nike	None
Tianjin Jinmen Tiger	(China) Yu Genwei	(China) Wang Qiuming	(United States) Nike	Cloudchain; TEDA Nangang Group
Wuhan Three Towns	(China) Deng Zhuoxiang (caretaker)	(China) Ren Hang	(United States) Nike	Huayuan Securities
Yunnan Yukun	(Norway) Jørn Andersen	(China) Zhao Yuhao	(United States) Nike	Yunnan Yukun
Zhejiang	(Spain) Raúl Caneda	(Croatia) Franko Andrijašević	(United States) Nike	Leapmotor

=== Managerial changes ===
Team	Outgoing manager	Manner of departure	Date of vacancy	Position in table	Incoming manager	Date of appointment
Beijing Guoan	(Portugal) Ricardo Soares	Mutual consent	10 December 2024	Pre-season	(Spain) Quique Setién	10 December 2024
Wuhan Three Towns	(Spain) Ricardo Rodríguez	Signed by (Japan) Kashiwa Reysol	11 December 2024	Pre-season	(Portugal) Filipe Martins	17 January 2025
Qingdao Hainiu	(Bulgaria) Yasen Petrov	Mutual consent	17 January 2025	Pre-season	(China) Li Xiaopeng	18 January 2025
Zhejiang	(Spain) Jordi Vinyals	Mutual consent	31 December 2024	Pre-season	(Spain) Raúl Caneda	28 January 2025
Wuhan Three Towns	(Portugal) Filipe Martins	Sacked	11 April 2025	16th	(China) Deng Zhuoxiang (caretaker)	11 April 2025
Henan	(South Korea) Nam Ki-il	Sacked	29 April 2025	13th	(Portugal) Daniel Ramos	29 April 2025
Changchun Yatai	(China) Xie Hui	Sacked	6 May 2025	16th	(Portugal) Ricardo Soares	8 May 2025
Meizhou Hakka	(Serbia) Milan Ristić	Sacked	30 June 2025	14th	(China) Qu Gang (caretaker)	6 July 2025
Shandong Taishan	(South Korea) Choi Kang-hee	Health issues	7 July 2025	5th	(China) Han Peng (caretaker)	7 July 2025
Shenzhen Peng City	(Italy) Christian Lattanzio	Sacked	7 July 2025	13th	(Spain) Pep Muñoz	10 July 2025
Shenzhen Peng City	(Spain) Pep Muñoz	Sacked	30 September 2025	13th	(China) Chen Tao (caretaker)	30 September 2025
Beijing Guoan	(Spain) Quique Setién	Resigned	5 October 2025	4th	(Spain) Ramiro Amarelle (caretaker)	7 October 2025
Qingdao West Coast	(China) Shao Jiayi	Appointed by China	5 November 2025	9th	(Germany) Reiner Maurer (caretaker)	5 November 2025

=== Foreign players ===
- Players name in **bold** indicates the player is registered during the mid-season transfer window.
- Players in italics were out of the squad or left the club within the season, after the pre-season transfer window, or in the mid-season transfer window, and at least had one appearance.

Team	Player 1	Player 2	Player 3	Player 4	Player 5	Naturalised players	Hong Kong/Macau/ Taiwan players^{1}	Reserves players	Former players
Beijing Guoan	(Angola) Fábio Abreu	(Brazil) Dawhan	(Cameroon) Michael Ngadeu-Ngadjui	(Portugal) Guga	(Serbia) Uroš Spajić	(Brazil) → (China) Serginho^{2} (Paraguay) → (China) Arturo Cheng			
Changchun Yatai	(Colombia) **Juan Camilo Salazar**	(France) Wylan Cyprien	(Norway) Ohi Omoijuanfo	(Serbia) Lazar Rosić	(Zambia) Stoppila Sunzu			(Slovenia) Robert Berić	
Chengdu Rongcheng	(Brazil) Felipe	(Brazil) Rômulo	(Israel) Yahav Gurfinkel	(Netherlands) Timo Letschert	(Sierra Leone) Issa Kallon	(Portugal) → (China) Pedro Delgado (Switzerland) → (China) Ming-yang Yang	(Chinese Taipei) Tim Chow		
Dalian Yingbo	(Brazil) **Daniel Penha**	(Mali) Mamadou Traoré	(Morocco) Zakaria Labyad	(North Macedonia) Isnik Alimi	(Switzerland) Cephas Malele				(Brazil) Fernando Karanga
Henan	(Brazil) Bruno Nazário	(Brazil) Felippe Cardoso	(Brazil) Iago Maidana	(Brazil) Lucas Maia	(Ghana) Frank Acheampong		(Hong Kong) Oliver Gerbig		
Meizhou Hakka	(Brazil) Rodrigo Henrique	(Cameroon) Jerome Ngom Mbekeli	(Croatia) Darick Kobie Morris	(Iceland) **Elías Már Ómarsson**	(Serbia) Branimir Jočić		(Hong Kong) Yue Tze Nam		(Cameroon) Michael Cheukoua
Qingdao Hainiu	(Bosnia and Herzegovina) Elvis Sarić	(Brazil) Filipe Augusto	(Brazil) Wellington Silva	(Cameroon) **Didier Lamkel Zé**	(Serbia) Nikola Radmanovac		(Hong Kong) Wong Ho Chun		(Peru) Santiago Ormeño
Qingdao West Coast	(Angola) Nélson da Luz	(Brazil) Davidson	(Brazil) Matheus Índio	(Brazil) Riccieli	(Ghana) Abdul-Aziz Yakubu	(Spain) → (China) Alex Yang^{2}	(Chinese Taipei) Chen Po-liang		
Shandong Taishan	(Brazil) Cryzan	(Brazil) Guilherme Madruga	(Brazil) Zeca	(Georgia (country)) Valeri Qazaishvili	(Spain) **Lluís López**		(Hong Kong) Raphaël Merkies		(Brazil) Lucas Gazal
Shanghai Port	(Brazil) Gabrielzinho	(Brazil) Leonardo	(Brazil) Mateus Vital	(Brazil) Matheus Jussa	(Spain) **Óscar Melendo**	(England) → (China) Tyias Browning^{2}	(Hong Kong) **Alexander Jojo**	(Brazil) Gustavo	(Chinese Taipei) Will Donkin
Shanghai Shenhua	(Brazil) André Luis	(Equatorial Guinea) **Luis Asué**	(France) Ibrahim Amadou	(Portugal) João Carlos Teixeira	(Portugal) Wilson Manafá	(England) → (China) Nico Yennaris^{2} (Hong Kong) → (China) Dai Wai Tsun^{2} (Slovenia) → (China) Marcel Petrov	(Hong Kong) Shinichi Chan	(Brazil) Saulo Mineiro	
Shenzhen Peng City	(Brazil) Tiago Leonço	(Brazil) **Wesley**	(Israel) Eden Kartsev	(Serbia) Rade Dugalić	(Spain) Edu García		(Hong Kong) Matt Orr		(Austria) Manprit Sarkaria
Tianjin Jinmen Tiger	(Albania) Albion Ademi	(Portugal) Xadas	(Spain) Alberto Quiles	(Spain) Cristian Salvador	(Spain) Juan Antonio Ros		(Hong Kong) Sun Ming Him		
Wuhan Three Towns	(Brazil) Darlan	(Brazil) Gustavo Sauer	(Colombia) Manuel Palacios	(Romania) Alexandru Tudorie	(South Korea) Park Ji-soo	(Italy) → (China) Denny Wang	(Chinese Taipei) **Will Donkin**		
Yunnan Yukun	(Brazil) Pedro Henrique	(Democratic Republic of the Congo) Oscar Maritu	(Portugal) Nené	(Romania) Alexandru Ioniță	(Romania) **Andrei Burcă**	(Norway) → (China) John Hou Sæter	(Hong Kong) Tsui Wang Kit		(Angola) Hélder Costa (Spain) José Martínez
Zhejiang	(Brazil) Lucas Possignolo	(Brazil) **Yago Cariello**	(Croatia) Franko Andrijašević	(Netherlands) Deabeas Owusu-Sekyere	(Romania) **Alexandru Mitriță**	(Gabon) → (China) Alexander N'Doumbou	(Hong Kong) Leung Nok Hang		(Gabon) Aaron Boupendza (Ivory Coast) Jean Evrard Kouassi

- **^1** For Hong Kong, Macau, or Taiwanese players, if they are non-naturalised and were registered as professional footballers in Hong Kong's, Macau's, or Chinese Taipei's football association for the first time, they are recognised as native players. Otherwise they are recognised as foreign players.
- **^2** Players who have already capped by a China senior or youth national team.

== League table ==
Pos	Team	Pld	W	D	L	GF	GA	GD	Pts	Qualification or relegation
1	Shanghai Port (C)	30	20	6	4	72	44	+28	66	Qualification for AFC Champions League Elite league stage
2	Shanghai Shenhua	30	19	7	4	67	35	+32	64	Qualification for AFC Champions League Two group stage
3	Chengdu Rongcheng	30	17	9	4	60	28	+32	60	
4	Beijing Guoan	30	17	6	7	69	46	+23	57	Qualification for AFC Champions League Elite league stage (Note: As Chinese FA Cup winners.)
5	Shandong Taishan	30	15	8	7	69	46	+23	53	
6	Tianjin Jinmen Tiger	30	12	8	10	40	41	−1	44	
7	Zhejiang	30	10	12	8	60	51	+9	42	
8	Yunnan Yukun	30	11	9	10	47	52	−5	42	
9	Qingdao West Coast	30	10	10	10	39	43	−4	40	
10	Henan	30	10	7	13	52	48	+4	37	
11	Dalian Yingbo	30	9	9	12	30	45	−15	36	
12	Shenzhen Peng City	30	8	3	19	35	59	−24	27	
13	Wuhan Three Towns	30	6	7	17	34	62	−28	25	
14	Qingdao Hainiu	30	5	10	15	35	48	−13	25	
15	Meizhou Hakka (R)	30	5	6	19	36	71	−35	21	Relegation to China League One
16	Changchun Yatai (R)	30	4	7	19	26	52	−26	19	Relegation to China League One

Source: Soccerway
Rules for classification:
- During season: 1) Points; 2) Head-to-head points; 3) Head-to-head goal difference; 4) Head-to-head goals scored; 5) Goal difference; 6) Goals scored; 7) Rankings in the previous season. (Rules 2 to 4 are only applied when teams concerned have finished both/all the matches against others.)
- After season: 1) Points; 2) Head-to-head points; 3) Head-to-head goal difference; 4) Head-to-head goals scored; 5) Goal difference; 6) Goals scored; 7) Disciplinary points (yellow card = 1 point, red card = 3 points); 8) Drawing of lots.
  (C) Champions; (R) Relegated
  Notes:

== Results ==
Home \ Away	BJG	CCY	CDR	DLY	HEN	MZH	QDH	QWC	SDT	SHP	SHS	SPC	TJT	WTT	YNY	ZHJ
Beijing Guoan	—	2–1	1–1	4–2	1–0	5–1	2–4	1–0	6–1	2–3	1–3	3–1	2–2	4–0	2–1	2–0
Changchun Yatai	0–4	—	1–2	0–2	0–1	1–0	2–2	1–0	1–2	1–3	1–2	1–0	1–2	1–1	0–0	3–3
Chengdu Rongcheng	2–0	1–0	—	2–0	1–2	3–1	0–0	1–1	2–1	4–1	1–0	5–0	1–2	1–0	1–1	2–1
Dalian Yingbo	0–2	2–0	0–2	—	1–0	1–0	2–0	0–2	2–0	0–1	0–3	2–1	1–1	0–0	3–2	1–0
Henan	2–0	2–0	3–2	4–0	—	1–1	3–1	2–3	2–2	1–3	1–3	4–1	3–4	1–2	1–1	2–2
Meizhou Hakka	0–4	1–3	0–4	2–2	2–1	—	1–0	1–2	3–4	2–4	1–3	3–0	1–2	3–1	1–4	2–2
Qingdao Hainiu	1–1	3–0	0–1	1–1	1–1	1–1	—	2–2	2–2	3–4	0–2	0–1	2–0	1–0	5–1	0–3
Qingdao West Coast	1–3	1–0	2–2	2–0	2–1	3–1	1–0	—	1–5	3–3	1–2	0–0	2–2	2–0	0–0	0–2
Shandong Taishan	6–0	2–1	0–3	4–1	0–0	3–0	1–1	3–2	—	3–1	0–1	4–0	2–1	3–1	1–1	4–2
Shanghai Port	1–2	2–0	1–3	3–0	4–1	2–1	3–1	2–2	1–1	—	1–1	3–1	1–1	3–2	4–2	3–0
Shanghai Shenhua	2–2	2–1	1–1	2–2	3–2	6–1	3–2	4–0	3–3	1–2	—	1–0	3–0	2–0	3–1	3–2
Shenzhen Peng City	2–1	3–1	1–1	1–1	1–3	2–0	4–0	1–2	1–3	1–2	3–1	—	1–0	1–2	3–4	2–4
Tianjin Jinmen Tiger	2–2	2–2	2–1	2–0	1–0	2–2	1–0	0–0	1–0	1–4	1–3	1–0	—	4–0	0–1	2–0
Wuhan Three Towns	4–4	0–0	2–2	2–2	2–5	1–2	2–0	1–1	1–5	0–2	1–0	1–2	2–1	—	3–1	0–4
Yunnan Yukun	0–2	1–1	1–5	1–1	2–1	2–0	1–0	1–0	3–2	2–3	4–4	3–1	2–0	2–1	—	1–1
Zhejiang	3–4	4–2	3–3	1–1	2–2	2–2	2–2	2–1	2–2	2–2	0–0	3–0	2–0	3–2	3–1	—

Source: Soccerway
Legend: Blue = home team win; Yellow = draw; Red = away team win.
For upcoming matches, an "a" indicates there is an article about the rivalry between the two participants.

== Positions by round ==
To preserve chronological evolvements, any postponed matches are not included to the round at which they were originally scheduled, but added to the full round they were played immediately afterwards. For example, if a match is scheduled for round 7, but then played between rounds 8 and 9, it will be added to the standings for round 8.

Team ╲ Round	1	2	3	4	5	6	7	8	9	10	11	12	13	14	15	16	17	18	19	20	21	22	23	24	25	26	27	28	29	30
Shanghai Port	1	1	1	1	1	4	3	4	3	4	4	4	4	4	4	4	3	2	2	2	1	3	3	2	2	1	1	1	1	1
Shanghai Shenhua	3	5	3	2	2	1	1	1	1	2	1	1	1	2	2	2	1	1	1	1	2	1	2	3	3	3	3	3	2	2
Chengdu Rongcheng	4	8	9	6	3	3	4	2	2	1	2	2	2	3	3	3	4	4	3	3	4	4	1	1	1	2	2	2	3	3
Beijing Guoan	2	3	7	8	5	6	5	5	4	3	3	3	3	1	1	1	2	3	4	4	3	2	4	4	4	4	4	4	4	4
Shandong Taishan	11	2	2	7	4	2	2	3	5	5	5	5	5	6	5	5	6	5	8	5	5	5	5	5	5	5	5	5	5	5
Tianjin Jinmen Tiger	5	6	4	5	7	5	6	6	6	8	7	6	6	5	7	6	5	6	6	6	6	7	7	7	6	6	6	6	6	6
Zhejiang	9	10	5	3	8	8	7	9	7	6	8	8	9	10	8	10	8	8	5	8	7	6	6	6	7	7	7	7	7	7
Yunnan Yukun	16	13	10	11	10	10	11	10	11	13	11	9	7	7	6	7	10	9	9	10	8	8	8	9	9	10	9	8	8	8
Qingdao West Coast	6	4	6	4	6	7	8	7	9	7	6	7	8	8	9	8	9	10	10	9	10	10	10	10	10	8	8	9	9	9
Henan	12	12	14	14	12	12	14	12	13	14	14	14	13	12	12	12	13	13	13	12	12	11	12	11	11	11	11	11	10	10
Dalian Yingbo	10	14	11	9	11	11	9	11	10	9	9	10	10	11	11	9	7	7	7	7	9	9	9	8	8	9	10	10	11	11
Shenzhen Peng City	15	9	12	12	13	15	12	13	14	12	13	13	14	13	13	13	12	12	12	13	13	14	13	13	13	14	13	12	12	12
Wuhan Three Towns	14	16	16	16	16	14	13	15	12	11	12	12	12	9	10	11	11	11	11	11	11	12	11	12	12	12	12	13	13	13
Qingdao Hainiu	7	11	13	13	14	16	16	16	16	16	15	15	15	15	15	15	15	15	15	15	15	15	15	15	14	15	15	14	14	14
Meizhou Hakka	8	7	8	10	9	9	10	8	8	10	10	11	11	14	14	14	14	14	14	14	14	13	14	14	16	13	14	15	15	15
Changchun Yatai	13	15	15	15	15	13	15	14	15	15	16	16	16	16	16	16	16	16	16	16	16	16	16	16	15	16	16	16	16	16

Leader and qualification for AFC Champions League Elite group stage
Qualification for AFC Champions League Two group stage
Relegation to China League One

Source: Soccerway

== Results by match played ==
Team ╲ Round	1	2	3	4	5	6	7	8	9	10	11	12	13	14	15	16	17	18	19	20	21	22	23	24	25	26	27	28	29	30
Beijing Guoan	W	D	D	D	W	W	D	W	W	W	W	W	D	W	W	W	L	L	D	W	W	W	L	L	L	W	L	L	W	W
Changchun Yatai	L	L	L	D	L	W	L	D	L	L	L	L	L	L	W	L	L	L	D	L	W	W	D	L	D	D	L	D	L	L
Chengdu Rongcheng	W	L	D	W	W	W	D	W	W	W	W	W	D	L	W	D	L	W	W	W	D	W	W	W	D	D	W	D	L	D
Dalian Yingbo	D	L	W	D	L	D	W	L	D	W	L	D	L	W	L	W	W	W	W	L	L	L	W	W	D	L	D	D	D	L
Henan	D	L	L	L	W	L	L	W	L	L	L	W	D	W	L	D	D	L	L	W	L	W	D	W	W	L	W	D	W	D
Meizhou Hakka	D	W	L	L	W	L	D	W	D	L	L	L	L	L	L	L	D	L	L	W	L	D	L	W	L	L	L	L	D	L
Qingdao Hainiu	D	L	L	D	L	L	L	L	D	D	W	L	D	L	L	L	L	W	L	W	D	L	D	L	D	D	L	W	W	D
Qingdao West Coast	D	W	D	W	D	L	L	W	L	W	D	L	D	D	L	W	D	D	W	D	L	L	L	L	W	W	L	D	L	W
Shandong Taishan	D	W	W	L	W	W	W	L	L	D	L	W	D	L	W	D	L	W	L	W	W	W	W	D	D	D	D	W	W	W
Shanghai Port	W	W	D	W	D	W	W	L	W	L	W	W	D	D	W	W	W	D	W	W	W	D	L	W	W	W	W	L	W	W
Shanghai Shenhua	W	D	W	W	D	W	W	W	W	L	W	W	W	L	W	W	W	W	D	L	D	W	L	D	D	W	W	D	W	W
Shenzhen Peng City	L	W	L	L	L	L	W	L	D	W	D	L	L	W	L	L	W	L	L	L	L	L	W	L	L	L	W	W	L	D
Tianjin Jinmen Tiger	D	W	W	D	D	D	L	W	L	L	W	L	W	W	L	W	W	L	D	D	W	D	L	W	W	W	L	D	L	L
Wuhan Three Towns	L	L	L	D	L	W	D	L	W	W	L	D	W	W	L	D	D	L	D	L	L	L	W	L	L	L	D	L	L	L
Yunnan Yukun	L	D	W	L	W	L	D	D	L	L	W	W	W	D	W	L	L	W	D	L	W	L	D	L	D	D	W	W	W	D
Zhejiang	D	D	W	W	L	L	D	L	W	W	L	L	D	D	W	L	W	W	W	L	D	D	W	W	D	D	D	D	L	D

Source: Soccerway
W = Win; D = Draw; L = Loss

== Awards ==
=== Player of the Round ===
Player of the Round
Round	Player	Club	Ref.
1	(Spain) Alberto Quiles	Tianjin Jinmen Tiger	
2	(China) Yang Chaosheng	Meizhou Hakka	
3	(Brazil) Saulo Mineiro	Shanghai Shenhua	
4	(Spain) Alberto Quiles (2)	Tianjin Jinmen Tiger	
5	(Cameroon) Jerome Ngom Mbekeli	Meizhou Hakka	
6	(Brazil) Cryzan	Shandong Taishan	
7	(Brazil) Cryzan (2)	Shandong Taishan	
8	(Angola) Fábio Abreu	Beijing Guoan	
9	(China) Wang Yudong	Zhejiang	
10	(China) Wang Yudong (2)	Zhejiang	
11	(Brazil) Wellington Silva	Qingdao Hainiu	
12	(Georgia (country)) Valeri Qazaishvili	Shandong Taishan	
13	(China) Tao Qianglong	Zhejiang	
14	(Spain) Alberto Quiles (3)	Tianjin Jinmen Tiger	
15	(Romania) Alexandru Mitriță	Zhejiang	
16	(Switzerland) Cephas Malele	Dalian Yingbo	
17	(Brazil) Wesley	Shenzhen Peng City	
18	(Georgia (country)) Valeri Qazaishvili (2)	Shandong Taishan	
19	(Brazil) Felipe	Chengdu Rongcheng	
20	(Ghana) Frank Acheampong	Henan	
21	(Angola) Fábio Abreu (2)	Beijing Guoan	
22	(Brazil) Cryzan (3)	Shandong Taishan	
23	(Georgia (country)) Valeri Qazaishvili (3)	Shandong Taishan	
24	(Georgia (country)) Valeri Qazaishvili (4)	Shandong Taishan	
25	(Brazil) Leonardo	Shanghai Port	
26	(Angola) Fábio Abreu (3)	Beijing Guoan	
27	(Brazil) Leonardo (2)	Shanghai Port	
28	(Bosnia and Herzegovina) Elvis Sarić	Qingdao Hainiu	
29	(China) He Chao	Henan	
30	(Angola) Fábio Abreu (4)	Beijing Guoan	

=== Monthly awards ===
Month	Player of the Month		Coach of the Month		Goalkeeper of the Month	
Month	Player	Club	Manager	Club	Player	Club
February/March	(China) Yang Chaosheng	Meizhou Hakka	(China) Yu Genwei	Tianjin Jinmen Tiger	(China) Han Jiaqi	Beijing Guoan
April	(Angola) Fábio Abreu	Beijing Guoan	(South Korea) Seo Jung-won	Chengdu Rongcheng	(China) Liu Dianzuo	Chengdu Rongcheng
May	(China) Wang Yudong	Zhejiang	(Spain) Quique Setién	Beijing Guoan	(China) Chen Wei	Shanghai Port
June	(China) Tan Long	Changchun Yatai	(Spain) Quique Setién	Beijing Guoan	(China) Li Hao	Qingdao West Coast
July	(Romania) Alexandru Mitriță	Zhejiang	(China) Li Guoxu	Dalian Yingbo	(China) Huang Zihao	Dalian Yingbo

Team of the Month
Month	Goalkeeper	Defenders	Midfielders	Forwards
February/March	(China) Han Jiaqi (Beijing Guoan)	(Brazil) Lucas Possignolo (Zhejiang) (Brazil) Lucas Gazal (Shandong Taishan) (Spain) Juan Antonio Ros (Tianjin Jinmen Tiger)	(Croatia) Franko Andrijašević (Zhejiang) (China) Li Xinxiang (Shanghai Port) (China) Wu Xi (Shanghai Shenhua) (Brazil) Matheus Índio (Qingdao West Coast)	(Spain) Alberto Quiles (Tianjin Jinmen Tiger) (Brazil) Saulo Mineiro (Shanghai Shenhua) (China) Yang Chaosheng (Meizhou Hakka)
April	(China) Liu Dianzuo (Chengdu Rongcheng)	(China) Hu Hetao (Chengdu Rongcheng) (Brazil) Iago Maidana (Henan) (Netherlands) Timo Letschert (Chengdu Rongcheng) (Hong Kong) Shinichi Chan (Shanghai Shenhua)	(Portugal) João Carlos Teixeira (Shanghai Shenhua) (Brazil) Rômulo (Chengdu Rongcheng) (Portugal) Guga (Beijing Guoan)	(Brazil) Cryzan (Shandong Taishan) (Spain) Alberto Quiles (Tianjin Jinmen Tiger) (Angola) Fábio Abreu (Beijing Guoan)
May	(China) Chen Wei (Shanghai Port)	(China) Zhu Chenjie (Shanghai Shenhua) (Serbia) Rade Dugalić (Shenzhen Peng City) (Netherlands) Timo Letschert (Chengdu Rongcheng)	(China) Lin Liangming (Beijing Guoan) (Brazil) Mateus Vital (Shanghai Port) (Portugal) Guga (Beijing Guoan) (Georgia (country)) Valeri Qazaishvili (Shandong Taishan)	(China) Tao Qianglong (Zhejiang) (Brazil) Saulo Mineiro (Shanghai Shenhua) (China) Wang Yudong (Zhejiang)
June	(China) Li Hao (Qingdao West Coast)	(Portugal) Wilson Manafá (Shanghai Shenhua) (South Korea) Park Ji-soo (Wuhan Three Towns) (China) Zhu Chenjie (Shanghai Shenhua)	(Ghana) Frank Acheampong (Henan) (Portugal) João Carlos Teixeira (Shanghai Shenhua) (Georgia (country)) Valeri Qazaishvili (Shandong Taishan) (China) Wei Shihao (Chengdu Rongcheng)	(China) Tan Long (Changchun Yatai) (Brazil) Zeca (Shandong Taishan) (Angola) Fábio Abreu (Beijing Guoan)
July	(China) Huang Zihao (Dalian Yingbo)	(Netherlands) Timo Letschert (Chengdu Rongcheng) (China) Jiang Shenglong (Shanghai Shenhua) (Hong Kong) Shinichi Chan (Shanghai Shenhua)	(Romania) Alexandru Mitriță (Zhejiang) (Morocco) Zakaria Labyad (Dalian Yingbo) (China) Wu Xi (Shanghai Shenhua) (Ghana) Frank Acheampong (Henan)	(Equatorial Guinea) Luis Asué (Shanghai Shenhua) (Brazil) Wesley (Shenzhen Peng City) (Georgia (country)) Valeri Qazaishvili (Shandong Taishan)

=== Annual awards ===
Award	Winner	Club
Chinese Super League Player of the Year	(Georgia (country)) Valeri Qazaishvili	Shandong Taishan
Chinese Super League Goalkeeper of the Year	(China) Liu Dianzuo	Chengdu Rongcheng
Chinese Super League Young Player of the Year	(China) Wang Yudong	Zhejiang
Chinese Super League Manager of the Year	(Spain) Dani Ramírez	Henan
Chinese Super League Top Scorer	(Angola) Fábio Abreu	Beijing Guoan

Team of the Year
Goalkeeper	(China) Liu Dianzuo (Chengdu Rongcheng)			
Defenders	(Netherlands) Timo Letschert (Chengdu Rongcheng)		(China) Jiang Shenglong (Shanghai Shenhua)	(China) Zhu Chenjie (Shanghai Shenhua)
Midfielders	(Georgia (country)) Valeri Qazaishvili (Shandong Taishan)	(Romania) Alexandru Mitriță (Zhejiang)	(Brazil) Rômulo (Chengdu Rongcheng)	(Brazil) Mateus Vital (Shanghai Port)
Forwards	(Angola) Fábio Abreu (Beijing Guoan)		(Brazil) Leonardo (Shanghai Port)	(Brazil) Felipe Silva (Chengdu Rongcheng)

== League attendance ==
Pos	Team	Total	High	Low	Average	Change
1	Dalian Yingbo	874,020	n/a	n/a	58,268	n/a
2	Beijing Guoan	674,627	n/a	n/a	44,975	n/a
3	Chengdu Rongcheng	612,299	n/a	n/a	40,820	n/a
4	Shanghai Shenhua	562,575	n/a	n/a	37,505	n/a
5	Shandong Taishan	417,951	n/a	n/a	27,863	n/a
6	Zhejiang FC	382,701	n/a	n/a	25,513	n/a
7	Tianjin Jinmen Tiger	376,456	n/a	n/a	25,097	n/a
8	Shenzhen Peng City	352,880	n/a	n/a	23,525	n/a
9	Qingdao Hainiu	337,567	n/a	n/a	22,504	n/a
10	Yunnan Yukun	332,630	n/a	n/a	22,175	n/a
11	Shanghai Port	290,697	n/a	n/a	19,380	n/a
12	Henan FC	249,685	n/a	n/a	16,646	n/a
13	Qingdao West Coast	214,465	n/a	n/a	14,298	n/a
14	Meizhou Hakka	188,864	n/a	n/a	12,591	n/a
15	Changchun Yatai	165,366	n/a	n/a	11,024	n/a
16	Wuhan Three Towns	148,207	n/a	n/a	9,880	n/a
	League total	6,180,990	n/a	n/a	25,754	n/a

Notes:
^{†} Teams played previous season in CL1.

== See also ==
- 2025 Chinese FA Cup
- 2025 Chinese FA Super Cup
