= Liaoning Tieren F.C. =

Chinese football club

Liaoning Tieren
- Full name: Liaoning Tieren Football Club 辽宁铁人足球俱乐部
- Founded: 26 June 2015; 11 years ago as Shenyang City
- Ground: Tiexi Stadium
- Capacity: 40,000
- Chairman: Wu Jiang
- Head coach: Seo Jung-won
- League: Chinese Super League
- 2026: Chinese Super League, 13th of 16
- Website: www.lnsycsfc.com
Home colours	Away colours	Third colours

Liaoning Tieren Football Club (Chinese: 辽宁铁人足球俱乐部; pinyin: Liáoníng Tiěrén Zúqiú Jùlèbù; lit. 'Liaoning Iron Men F.C.'), currently known as Liaoning Tieren Rural Commercial Bank (Chinese: 辽宁铁人农商银行) for sponsorship reasons, is a Chinese professional football club based in Shenyang, Liaoning, that competes in the Chinese Super League, the top tier of Chinese football. Liaoning Tieren plays its home matches at the Tiexi Stadium, located within Tiexi District.

== History ==
=== Establishment and early years ===
Shenyang City was established by former footballer Zhuang Yi in 2015 with out-of-contract players from Shenyang Zhongze who dissolved just before the 2015 China League One season. Prior to founding the club, Zhuang Yi had attempted to acquire Shenyang Zhongze F.C. before its dissolution to prevent the team from folding, but his proposal was rejected by local authorities. They enrolled in the 2015 China Football Amateur League and finished in the top 4, gaining promotion to China League Two, and subsequently rebranded to Shenyang Urban starting the following year.

=== China League Two era (2016–2019) ===
The club enjoyed a lengthy stay in China League Two, making it to the play-off stage twice, in the 2016 and 2018 seasons, but fell short in the first round both times. The 2018 season marked the club's first serious promotion push, with an investment of 80 million yuan and the appointment of former professional Wang Bo as manager. The team recruited several former Chinese Super League players including Xu Bo and Quan Lei. Shenyang City started the season strongly with nine consecutive victories, topping the North Division table. However, a subsequent six-match winless streak caused them to drop out of the automatic promotion places. The team ultimately reached the promotion playoffs but were eliminated in the first round, failing to secure promotion to China League One.

On 12 May 2018, club owner Zhuang Yi was substituted on in a 7–1 league win over Baotou Nanjiao to become the oldest ever appearance-maker in professional Chinese football at 44 years and 305 days. Zhuang then broke his own appearance record on 3 June 2018 in a 4–0 win against Yanbian Beiguo, and scored a penalty in the match, making him the oldest goal scorer in professional Chinese football at 44 years and 327 days.

The club's effort finally came to fruition in the 2019 China League Two, when they were crowned as champions after beating Chengdu Better City in the finals, gaining a historic promotion to China League One. For the 2019 season, the club appointed Yu Ming, former captain of Liaoning F.C., as head coach. Under Yu's leadership, the team achieved a 19-match unbeaten run, including a record-breaking 14 consecutive victories in the second half of the season. On 19 October 2019, Shenyang City defeated Chengdu Better City 2–0 in the second leg of the China League Two final at their home stadium, winning 4–1 on aggregate and securing the league championship.

=== Liaoning Shenyang Urban era (2020–2023) ===
In April 2020, the club changed their name to Liaoning Shenyang Urban. Following the rebranding, the club faced significant financial difficulties. Due to insufficient investment, the team struggled in the lower mid-table of China League One for four consecutive seasons.

=== Rebranding to Liaoning Tieren (2024–present) ===
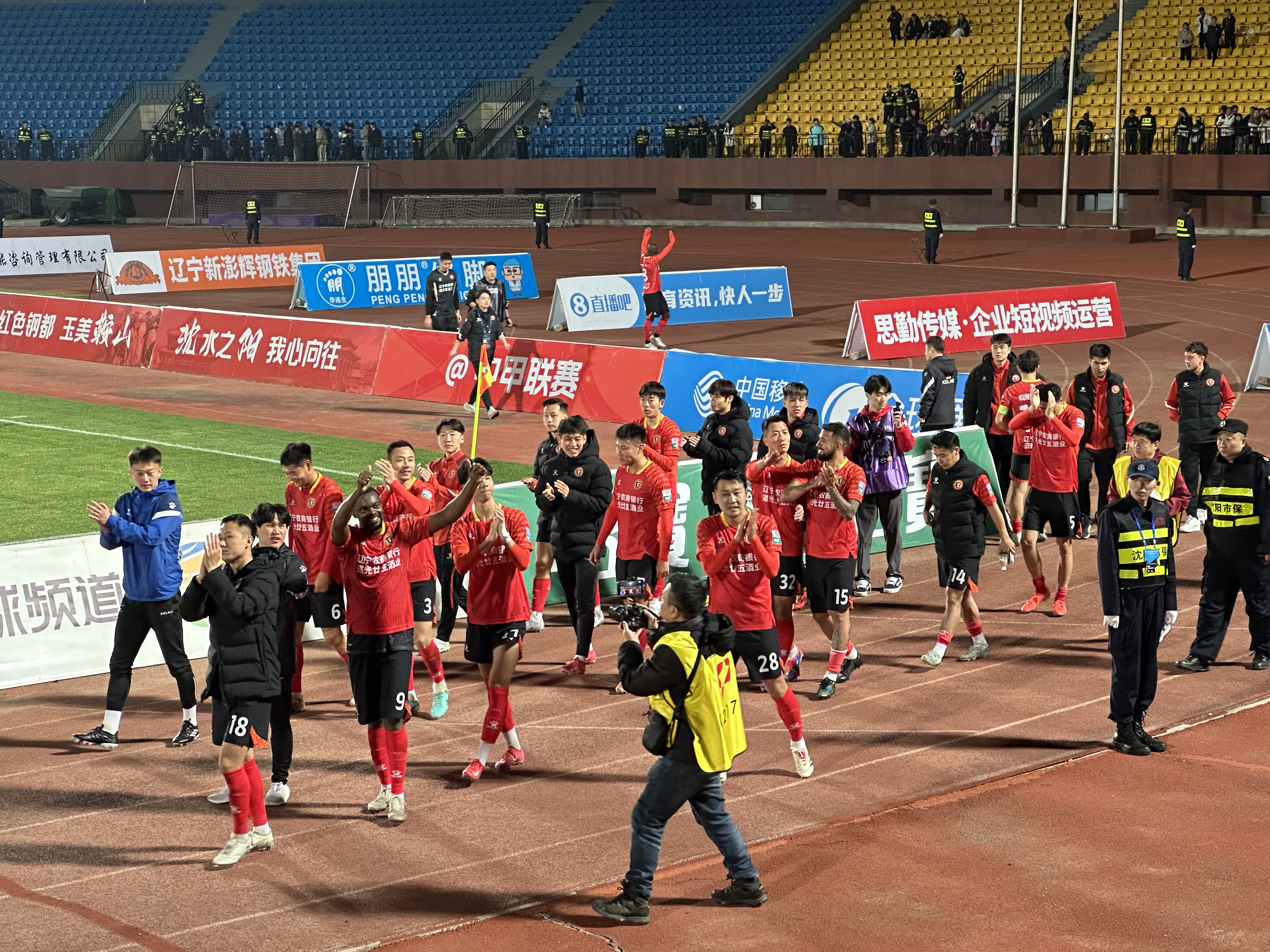
Liaoning Tieren players after a league match in 2025

On 8 January 2024, a press conference held by the People's Government of Liaoning revealed that the club would be renamed to Liaoning Liudi (Chinese: 辽宁六地足球俱乐部), and would be promoted to the Chinese Super League within the next two years, in an effort to revitalise football in Liaoning. and the Liaoning Provincial Government designated the club as a pilot unit for professional football reform, announcing a goal of "promotion to the Chinese Super League within two years." The initial proposal to rename the club "Liaoning Liudi" (referencing Liaoning's "six key locations" in Communist Party history) proved controversial among fans, who criticized the name as overly political and lacking sports characteristics. Following fan feedback, the club abandoned the "Liudi" name and held a public vote, initially selecting "Liaoning Northeast Tiger" before ultimately settling on "Liaoning Tieren" (Iron Man). On 6 February, it was announced that Liaoning Shenyang Urban have changed their name to Liaoning Tieren. The "Tieren" name, referencing the ironworker statue in Tiexi District symbolizing the industrial heritage of Northeast China, was officially approved on 6 February 2024.

In preparation for the 2025 season, the club relocated from Shenyang Olympic Sports Centre to Tiexi Stadium, which underwent a three-month renovation to become Shenyang's first professional football stadium. The reconstruction removed the running track, expanded capacity to 40,000 seats, installed natural grass with heating systems, and upgraded lighting to meet VAR requirements. The upgraded stadium opened on 31 May 2025, with the club subsequently breaking their attendance record on 19 July 2025 when 39,868 spectators watched a 4–2 victory over Chongqing Tongliang Long.

The 2025 season saw the club assemble what local media described as the "most luxurious squad in League One," including the signing of Congolese striker Guy Mbenza for a reported 2 million euro transfer fee. Under manager Li Jinyu, the team went on a 19-match unbeaten run, with Mbenza scoring 28 goals to break the League One single-season record and Japanese midfielder Kunimoto contributing 19 assists. On 26 October 2025, after a 1–0 victory over Nantong Zhiyun, Liaoning Tieren were promoted to the 2026 Chinese Super League for the first time in their history, being crowned the 2025 China League One champions in the process. The promotion completed the club's "four-level jump" from amateur football to the top tier in ten years.

== Players ==
=== Current squad ===
As of August 2026

Note: Flags indicate national team as defined under FIFA eligibility rules; some limited exceptions apply. Players may hold more than one non-FIFA nationality.

No.	Pos.	Nation	Player
3	DF	CHN	Pan Ximing
5	DF	CHN	Dilmurat Mawlanyaz
7	FW	TPE	Ange Kouamé
8	MF	CHN	Yan Dinghao
9	FW	CGO	Guy Mbenza
10	FW	JPN	Takahiro Kunimoto
11	FW	CHN	Chen Binbin
13	GK	CHN	Jie Jintian
14	FW	CHN	Zang Yifeng
15	DF	BRA	Felipe
16	GK	CHN	Wang Tianai
17	FW	CHN	Tian Yuda
18	MF	CHN	Li Tixiang
19	DF	CHN	Wu Mingyu

No.	Pos.	Nation	Player
21	GK	CHN	Han Rongze
22	GK	CHN	Liu Guobo (on loan from Shandong Taishan)
26	DF	CHN	Yuan Mincheng
27	DF	CHN	Gao Jiarun
28	DF	CHN	Xu Dong
29	GK	CHN	Zhang Yan
30	DF	CHN	Pang Shenghan
33	MF	CHN	Tian Yinong
34	DF	CHN	Zhang Hongfu
35	DF	CHN	Li Haoran
36	DF	CHN	Tian De'ao
37	MF	BEL	Zheng Jiacheng
39	DF	CHN	Li Shiqi
47	FW	BRA	Jeffinho (on loan from Botafogo)

=== Out on loan ===
Note: Flags indicate national team as defined under FIFA eligibility rules; some limited exceptions apply. Players may hold more than one non-FIFA nationality.

No.	Pos.	Nation	Player
—	FW	CHN	Han Yuchen (at (China) Jiangxi Dingnan United until 31 December 2026)
—	DF	CHN	Tian Ziyi (at (China) Changchun Yatai until 31 December 2026)

== Coaching staff ==
Position	Staff
Head coach	(South Korea) Seo Jung-won
Assistant coach	(South Korea) Kim Hyung-il
Assistant coach	(South Korea) Ha Dae-sung
Assistant coach	(Croatia) Saša Kolić
Fitness coach	(China) Wang Chen

Source: CFA

== Managerial history ==
- (China) Li Zheng (2015)
- (Poland) Marek Zub (2016)
- (China) Xiao Zhanbo (2017)
- (China) Wang Bo (2018)
- (China) Niu Hongli (2018)
- (China) Wang Gang (2018)
- (China) Yu Ming (2019–2022)
- (China) Zhao Faqing (2022)
- (China) Duan Xin (2022–2024)
- (China) Sun Wei (2024)
- (China) Li Jinyu (2024–2026)
- (South Korea) Seo Jung-won (2026–)

== Honours ==
League

- China League One
  - Champions: 2025
- China League Two
  - Champions: 2019

== Results ==
All-time league rankings

As of the start from 2026 season.

Year	Div	Pld	W	D	L	GF	GA	GD	Pts	Pos.	FA Cup	Super Cup	AFC	Att./G	Stadium
2015	4									4	DNQ	DNQ	DNQ		
2016	3	20	10	3	7	30	19	11	33	8	R2	DNQ	DNQ	3,239	Shenyang Urban Construction University Stadium
2017	3	24	11	6	7	26	19	7	39	12	R1	DNQ	DNQ	1,910	Shenyang Urban Construction University Stadium
2018	3	28	16	5	7	51	29	22	53	6	R16	DNQ	DNQ	4,190	Shenyang Urban Construction University Stadium
2019	3	30	23	5	2	62	19	43	74^{1}	W	R2	DNQ	DNQ	2,511	Shenyang Urban Construction University Stadium
2020	2	10	2	3	5	9	14	-5	9^{1}	5	DNQ			28	Tiexi Stadium
2020	2	5	1	2	2	5	8	-3	5^{2}	4	DNQ			28	Tiexi Stadium
2021	2	34	7	4	23	30	62	-32	25	16	R3	DNQ	DNQ	4,177	Tiexi Stadium
2022	2	34	9	8	17	62	19	34	35	12	R1	DNQ	DNQ	0	Tiexi Stadium
2023	2	30	8	11	11	30	42	-12	35	10	R2	DNQ	DNQ	2,626	Tiexi Stadium
2024	2	30	14	8	8	41	33	8	50	4	R3	DNQ	DNQ	14,752	Tiexi Stadium
2025	2	30	20	8	2	64	27	37	68	1	R3	DNQ	DNQ	26,407	Tiexi Stadium
2026	1	30	8	5	17	42	58	-16	29	13	R4	DNQ	DNQ	27,037	Tiexi Stadium

- ^1 in North Group.
- ^1 in Regular season Group B.
- ^2 in To Relegation stage Group E.

Key

	China top division
	China second division
	China third division
	China fourth division
W	Winners
RU	Runners-up
3	Third place
	Relegated

- Pld = Played
- W = Games won
- D = Games drawn
- L = Games lost
- F = Goals for
- A = Goals against
- Pts = Points
- Pos = Final position
- DNQ = Did not qualify
- DNE = Did not enter
- NH = Not Held
- – = Does Not Exist
- R1 = Round 1
- R2 = Round 2
- R3 = Round 3
- R4 = Round 4
- F = Final
- SF = Semi-finals
- QF = Quarter-finals
- R16 = Round of 16
- Group = Group stage
- GS2 = Second Group stage
- QR1 = First Qualifying Round
- QR2 = Second Qualifying Round
- QR3 = Third Qualifying Round
