= 2023 Binzhou Huilong F.C. season =

Chinese football club season

Binzhou Huilong
2023 season
- Owner: Zhang Wei (until 16 September); Qin Ying Sports (from 16 September)
- Chairman: Zhang Wei (until 16 September); Huang Shenghua (from 16 September)
- Manager: Huang Yong (until 6 September); Óscar Céspedes (from 7 September)
- Stadium: Weinan Sports Center Stadium
- CMCL: 3rd (promoted via play-offs)
- Top goalscorer: League: Pang Zhiquan (9); All: Pang Zhiquan (9)
- Highest home attendance: 26,156 vs Guangzhou E-Power, 17 September 2023, CMCL
- Lowest home attendance: 15,347 vs Kaifeng Songyun, 8 October 2023, CMCL
- Average home league attendance: 22,850
Home colours	Away colours

The 2023 season was the first season in the existence of Shaanxi Union Football Club, and the last officially competing as Binzhou Huilong Football Club. It was their first season in the CMCL, the Chinese fourth-tier. The season saw Shaanxi Chang'an Union promoted to the Chinese third-tier as they were victorious in the promotion play-offs. The attendance of 25,696 against Dalian Huayi at the Weinan Sports Center Stadium on 3 September 2023 broke the CMCL record. The record was beaten two weeks later against Guangzhou E-Power, with 26,156 supporters in Weinan.

== First-team squad ==
As of 29 October 2023

Note: Flags indicate national team as has been defined under FIFA eligibility rules. Players may hold more than one non-FIFA nationality.

No.	Name	Position	Nationality	Place of birth	Date of birth (age)	Club apps	Club goals	Signed from	Date signed	Transfer fee	Contract end
Goalkeepers
1	Jia Xinyao	GK	(China)	Anlu	21 February 1995 (aged 27)	4	0	Guangxi Pingguo Haliao	21 April 2023	Free	
25	Li Chen	GK	(China)	Huai'an	25 November 1996 (aged 26)	10	0	Shaanxi Chang'an Athletic	20 April 2023	Free	31 December 2023
27	Bai Mingyu	GK	(China)	Xi'an	16 May 2003 (aged 19)	0	0	Wuhan Three Towns U19	22 August 2023	Free	31 December 2023
Defenders
2	Wang Zihao	CB	(China)	Huantai	20 March 1999 (aged 23)	7	1	Zibo Qisheng	20 April 2023	Free	
4	Wang Weipu	CB	(China)	Shenyang	26 November 1993 (aged 29)	9	1	Wuxi Wugo	12 July 2023	Free	31 December 2023
5	Zhou Jiahao	CB	(China)	Lishui	16 September 1995 (aged 27)	1	0	Nanjing City	20 April 2023	Free	
6	Ding Jie	CB	(China)	Dalian	29 April 1987 (aged 35)	13	5	Chongqing Liangjiang Athletic	20 April 2023	Free	31 December 2023
12	Zhao Shuhao	LB	(China)	Dancheng	18 January 1998 (aged 24)	12	0	Nantong Zhiyun	20 April 2023	Free	31 December 2023
16	Ma Yangyang	RB	(China)	Taihe	20 February 1998 (aged 24)	8	3	Zibo Qisheng	20 April 2023	Free	31 December 2023
26	Sun Xiaobin	CB	(China)	Lixin	16 February 1999 (aged 23)	12	1	Zibo Cuju	20 April 2023	Free	31 December 2023
29	Mi Haolun	LB	(China)	Xi'an	10 January 1993 (aged 29)	8	2	Shenzhen	3 August 2023	Free	31 December 2023
30	Yalqunjan Mamut	LB	(China)	Aksu	1 May 2003 (aged 19)	2	0	Jingchuan Wenhui	20 April 2023	Free	
31	Xu Chen	CB	(China)	Dalian	11 November 1989 (aged 33)	8	0	Hefei City	20 April 2023	Free	
Midfielders
7	Huang Pu	RM	(China)	Xi'an	1 July 1994 (aged 28)	6	1	Jinan Xingzhou	20 April 2023	Free	
8	Wen Wubin	CM	(China)	Xiangyang	7 January 1997 (aged 25)	8	1	Nanjing City	12 July 2023	Free	31 December 2023
9	Fu Jie	RM	(China)	Yan'an	15 February 2001 (aged 21)	7	0	Heilongjiang Ice City	20 April 2023	Free	
11	Wen Shuo	LM	(China)	Xi'an	5 January 1991 (aged 31)	5	1	Shaanxi Chang'an Athletic	20 April 2023	Free	31 December 2023
15	Su Shun	DM	(China)	Tianjin	9 March 1994 (aged 28)	9	1	Shaanxi Chang'an Athletic	20 April 2023	Free	
17	Huang Zhaoyi	CM	(China)	Foshan	17 December 1999 (aged 23)	1	0	Shaanxi Chang'an Athletic	20 April 2023	Free	
19	Zhang Yuxuan	CM	(China)	Zhengzhou	24 January 1995 (aged 27)	12	3	Shaanxi Chang'an Athletic	20 April 2023	Free	31 December 2023
20	Xu Zhaoji	DM	(China)	Dalian	9 March 1998 (aged 24)	5	0	Shaanxi Chang'an Athletic	20 April 2023	Free	
21	Chen Xing	DM	(China)	Guangzhou	29 March 2000 (aged 22)	8	0	Meizhou Hakka	20 April 2023	Free	31 December 2023
23	Liu Hao	CM	(China)	Jingbian	26 December 2001 (aged 21)	3	0		2023	Free	
32	Xu Wu	LM	(China)	Tiantai	14 February 1991 (aged 31)	12	2	Shaanxi Chang'an Athletic	20 April 2023	Free	31 December 2023
33	Liu Tianyang	RM	(China)	Shijiazhuang	21 August 1999 (aged 23)	7	2	Shijiazhuang Gongfu	21 April 2023	Free	
Forwards
10	Nan Yunqi	RW	(China)	Dalian	6 October 1993 (aged 29)	12	6	Yunnan Yukun	20 April 2023	Free	
13	Ma Xiaolei	RW	(China)	Beijing	19 January 1987 (aged 35)	9	3	Chengdu Rongcheng	21 April 2023	Free	31 December 2023
22	He Shaolin	ST	(China)	Lijiang	28 February 2003 (aged 19)	7	1	Guangzhou U21	21 April 2023	Free	
28	Xi Zhenyun	ST	(China)	Lijiang	10 January 1999 (aged 23)	2	0	Shaanxi Chang'an Athletic	20 April 2023	Free	
34	Pang Zhiquan	ST	(China)	Qingdao	16 August 1990 (aged 32)	12	9	Shaanxi Chang'an Athletic	20 April 2023	Free	31 December 2023

== Transfers ==
=== Transfers in ===
Date	Pos	Player	Transferred from	Fee	Ref
20 April 2023	DM	(China) Chen Xing	(China) Meizhou Hakka	Free transfer	
20 April 2023	CB	(China) Ding Jie	(China) Shaanxi Chang'an Athletic	Free transfer	
20 April 2023	RM	(China) Fu Jie	(China) Heilongjiang Ice City	Free transfer	
20 April 2023	RM	(China) Huang Pu	(China) Jinan Xingzhou	Free transfer	
20 April 2023	CM	(China) Huang Zhaoyi	(China) Shaanxi Chang'an Athletic	Free transfer	
20 April 2023	GK	(China) Li Chen	(China) Shaanxi Chang'an Athletic	Free transfer	
20 April 2023	RB	(China) Ma Yangyang	(China) Zibo Qisheng	Free transfer	
20 April 2023	LB	(China) Yalqunjan Mamut	(China) Jingchuan Wenhui	Free transfer	
20 April 2023	RW	(China) Nan Yunqi	(China) Yunnan Yukun	Free transfer	
20 April 2023	ST	(China) Pang Zhiquan	(China) Shaanxi Chang'an Athletic	Free transfer	
20 April 2023	DM	(China) Su Shun	(China) Shaanxi Chang'an Athletic	Free transfer	
20 April 2023	CB	(China) Sun Xiaobin	(China) Zibo Cuju	Free transfer	
20 April 2023	CB	(China) Wang Zihao	(China) Zibo Qisheng	Free transfer	
20 April 2023	LM	(China) Wen Shuo	(China) Shaanxi Chang'an Athletic	Free transfer	
20 April 2023	ST	(China) Xi Zhenyun	(China) Shaanxi Chang'an Athletic	Free transfer	
20 April 2023	CB	(China) Xu Chen	(China) Hefei City	Free transfer	
20 April 2023	LM	(China) Xu Wu	(China) Shaanxi Chang'an Athletic	Free transfer	
20 April 2023	DM	(China) Xu Zhaoji	(China) Shaanxi Chang'an Athletic	Free transfer	
20 April 2023	RB	(China) Yang Peng	(China) Shaanxi Chang'an Athletic	Free transfer	
20 April 2023	CM	(China) Zhang Yuxuan	(China) Shaanxi Chang'an Athletic	Free transfer	
20 April 2023	LB	(China) Zhao Shuhao	(China) Nantong Zhiyun	Free transfer	
20 April 2023	CB	(China) Zhou Jiahao	(China) Nanjing City	Free transfer	
21 April 2023	ST	(China) He Shaolin	(China) Guangzhou U21	Free transfer	
21 April 2023	GK	(China) Jia Xinyao	(China) Guangxi Pingguo Haliao	Free transfer	
21 April 2023	RM	(China) Liu Tianyang	(China) Shijiazhuang Gongfu	Free transfer	
21 April 2023	RW	(China) Ma Xiaolei	(China) Chengdu Rongcheng	Free transfer	
12 July 2023	CB	(China) Wang Weipu	(China) Wuxi Wugo	Free transfer	
12 July 2023	CM	(China) Wen Wubin	(China) Nanjing City	Free transfer	
3 August 2023	LB	(China) Mi Haolun	(China) Shenzhen	Free transfer	
17 August 2023	RB	(China) Nureli Tursunali	Free agent (previously (China) Xinjiang Tianshan Leopard)	Free transfer	
22 August 2023	GK	(China) Bai Mingyu	(China) Wuhan Three Towns U19	Free transfer	

== Friendlies ==
On 4 July, Shaanxi Chang'an Union announced a friendly against Uzbekistan Super League side FC Surkhon Termez to be played at the Yulin Sports Center on 22 July. On 15 August, the club announced they would host a behind closed doors friendly against Shenzhen Juniors at Union's training ground on the following day. Three days later, they announced a second behind closed doors friendly against Xi'an Chongde Ronghai to be played on 19 August.

Win Draw Loss Fixtures

22 July 2023 Friendly	Shaanxi Chang'an Union	0–3	(Uzbekistan) Surkhon Termez	Yulin
20:00 UTC+8				Stadium: Yulin Sports Center; Attendance: 18,989

16 August 2023 Friendly	Shaanxi Chang'an Union	2–1	Shenzhen Juniors	Xi'an
17:30 UTC+8				Stadium: Fengdong Football Park

19 August 2023 Friendly	Shaanxi Chang'an Union	2–0	Xi'an Chongde Ronghai	Xi'an
19:30 UTC+8				Stadium: Fengdong Football Park

== CMCL ==
=== Regionals ===
==== Group stage table ====
Group B

Pos	Team	Pld	W	D	L	GF	GA	GD	Pts	Qualification
1	Binzhou Huilong	3	3	0	0	8	0	+8	9	Qualification for Qualifying round
2	Yingkou Chaoyue	3	1	1	1	3	4	−1	4	Qualification for Qualifying round
3	Shandong Scout	3	0	2	1	2	4	−2	2	Qualification for Third-placed playoffs
4	Jingchuan Wenhui	3	0	1	2	1	6	−5	1	Qualification for Fourth-placed playoffs

Rules for classification: 1) Points; 2) Head-to-head points; 3) Head-to-head goal difference; 4) Head-to-head goals scored; 5) Goal difference; 6) Goals scored; 7) Disciplinary points (yellow card = 1 point, red card as a result of two yellow cards = 3 points, direct red card = 3 points, yellow card followed by direct red card = 4 points); 8) Drawing of lots.

==== Group stage results by matchday ====
Round	1	2	3
Ground	N	N	N
Result	W	W	W
Position	1	1	1

A = Away; H = Home; N = Neutral; W = Win; D = Draw; L = Loss; P = Postponed

==== Group stage matches ====
Win Draw Loss Fixtures

On 26 April, the fixtures for the regionals stage were announced.

29 April 2023 1	Binzhou Huilong	2–0	Shandong Scout	Rizhao
16:30 UTC+8	Nan Yunqi 58' (pen.); Pang Zhiquan 84'			Stadium: Rizhao International Football Center Training Base Field No. 1 Attendance: 366; Referee: Liu Hang

1 May 2023 2	Yingkou Chaoyue	0–3	Binzhou Huilong	Rizhao
13:30 UTC+8			11' Liu Tianyang; 61' Nan Yunqi; 80' Sun Xiaobin	Stadium: Rizhao International Football Center; Attendance: 625; Referee: Guo Zhen

3 May 2023 3	Jingchuan Wenhui	0–3	Binzhou Huilong	Rizhao
13:30 UTC+8			23' He Shaolin; 57' Pang Zhiquan; 74' Liu Tianyang	Stadium: Rizhao International Football Center; Attendance: 122; Referee: Liu Hang

==== Qualifying round table ====
Rizhao region

Pos	Team	Pld	W	D	L	GF	GA	GD	Pts	Qualification
1	Binzhou Huilong	3	2	1	0	7	2	+5	7	Qualification for Final round
2	Rizhao Yuqi	3	2	1	0	6	1	+5	7	Qualification for Final round
3	Xi'an Hi-Tech Yilian	3	1	0	2	4	6	−2	3	
4	Yingkou Chaoyue	3	0	0	3	1	9	−8	0	

Rules for classification: 1) Points; 2) Head-to-head points; 3) Head-to-head goal difference; 4) Head-to-head goals scored; 5) Goal difference; 6) Goals scored; 7) Disciplinary points (yellow card = 1 point, red card as a result of two yellow cards = 3 points, direct red card = 3 points, yellow card followed by direct red card = 4 points); 8) Drawing of lots.

==== Qualifying round results by matchday ====
Round	1	2
Ground	N	N
Result	W	D
Position	1	1

A = Away; H = Home; N = Neutral; W = Win; D = Draw; L = Loss; P = Postponed

==== Qualifying round matches ====
Win Draw Loss Fixtures

6 May 2023 4	Binzhou Huilong	3–1	Xi'an Hi-Tech Yilian	Rizhao
16:30 UTC+8	Zhang Yuxuan 9'; Wang Zihao 20'; Nan Yunqi 60' (pen.)		22' Lei Yutian	Stadium: Rizhao International Football Center; Attendance: 436; Referee: Han Lei

8 May 2023 5	Binzhou Huilong	1–1	Rizhao Yuqi	Rizhao
19:30 UTC+8	Pang Zhiquan 79'		32' Tai Jianfeng	Stadium: Rizhao International Football Center; Attendance: 5,025; Referee: Chen Sheng

=== Final round ===
==== Final round table ====
Group B

Pos	Team	Pld	W	D	L	GF	GA	GD	Pts	Promotion or qualification
2	Guangzhou E-Power (P)	7	5	0	2	26	5	+21	15	Qualification for Promotion play-offs
3	Dalian Huayi (P)	7	4	2	1	22	5	+17	14	Qualification for Promotion play-offs
4	Binzhou Huilong (O, P)	7	4	1	2	29	3	+26	13	Qualification for Promotion play-offs
5	Guangxi Hengchen (O, P)	7	4	0	3	20	9	+11	12	Qualification for Promotion play-offs
6	Wuhan Xiaoma	7	2	1	4	16	20	−4	7	

Rules for classification: 1) Points; 2) Head-to-head points; 3) Head-to-head goal difference; 4) Head-to-head goals scored; 5) Goal difference; 6) Goals scored; 7) Disciplinary points (yellow card = 1 point, red card as a result of two yellow cards = 3 points, direct red card = 3 points, yellow card followed by direct red card = 4 points); 8) Drawing of lots.
(O) Play-off winners; (P) Promoted

==== Final round results summary ====
Overall								Home						Away					
Pld	W	D	L	GF	GA	GD	Pts	W	D	L	GF	GA	GD	W	D	L	GF	GA	GD
7	4	1	2	29	3	+26	13	2	1	1	17	2	+15	2	0	1	12	1	+11

Last updated: 14 October 2023.

==== Final round results by matchday ====
Matchday	1	2	3	4	5	6	7
Ground	H	A	H	A	H	H	A
Result	D	L	L	W	W	W	W
Position	4	6	7	5	5	5	4

A = Away; H = Home; N = Neutral; W = Win; D = Draw; L = Loss; P = Postponed

==== Final round matches ====
Win Draw Loss Fixtures

After Binzhou Huilong's qualification to the final round, the subsequent fixtures were announced on 26 August.

3 September 2023 1	Binzhou Huilong	1–1	Dalian Huayi	Weinan
15:00 UTC+8	Nan Yunqi 40'		43' Cui Hao	Stadium: Weinan Sports Center Stadium; Attendance: 25,696; Referee: Li Pengda

10 September 2023 2	Langfang Glory City	1–0	Binzhou Huilong	Langfang
15:30 UTC+8	Li Siqi 88'			Stadium: Langfang Stadium; Attendance: 1,613; Referee: Li Zheng

17 September 2023 3	Binzhou Huilong	0–1	Guangzhou E-Power	Weinan
15:00 UTC+8			54' Xiao Zhi	Stadium: Weinan Sports Center Stadium; Attendance: 26,156; Referee: Wang Jian

24 September 2023 4	Changle Jingangtui	0–10	Binzhou Huilong	Fuzhou
15:00 UTC+8			17' Wang Weipu; 22' Wen Wubin; 39' Pang Zhiquan; 40' Zhang Yuxuan; 54', 89' Ding Jie; 57' Nan Yunqi; 66' Ma Xiaolei; 67' Xu Wu; 68' Wen Shuo	Stadium: Tianjin University-National University of Singapore Joint Institute in Fuzhou Football Field; Attendance: 345; Referee: Cui Yong

1 October 2023 5	Binzhou Huilong	7–0	Wuhan Xiaoma	Weinan
15:00 UTC+8	Xu Wu 8'; Ding Jie 35'; Pang Zhiquan 50', 54'; Zhang Yuxuan 68'; Su Shun 88'; Ma Xiaolei 90+2'			Stadium: Weinan Sports Center Stadium; Attendance: 23,386; Referee: Gu Zhongchao

8 October 2023 6	Binzhou Huilong	9–0	Kaifeng Songyun	Weinan
15:00 UTC+8	Pang Zhiquan 6'; Ma Xiaolei 17'; Mi Haolun 27', 35' (pen.); Zheng Yikang 32' (o.g.); Ding Jie 41', 45+2'; Ma Yangyang 47'; Nan Yunqi 85'			Stadium: Weinan Sports Center Stadium; Attendance: 15,347; Referee: Pei Xiaodong

14 October 2023 7	Guangxi Hengchen	0–2	Binzhou Huilong	Guigang
14:30 UTC+8			22' Huang Pu; 86' Ma Yangyang	Stadium: Jiuling Lake Football Training Centre Field 1 Attendance: 301; Referee: Tang Shunqi

=== Promotion play-offs ===
On 15 October, the ties for the 2023 CMCL promotion play-offs were confirmed. Binzhou Huilong were to play Changchun Shenhua in the first knock-out tie. Should Binzhou Huilong advance to the second knock-out tie, they were to face Guangzhou E-Power away.

21 October 2023 First round	Binzhou Huilong	1–1 (3–2 p)	Changchun Shenhua	Weinan
15:00 UTC+8	Pang Zhiquan 50'		61' Hou Zhe	Stadium: Weinan Sports Center Stadium; Attendance: 23,664; Referee: Niu Minghui
	Penalties
	Zhang Yuxuan (penalty scored); Ding Jie (penalty scored); Wen Wubin (penalty missed); Mi Haolun (penalty scored)		(penalty scored) Hou Zhe; (penalty missed) Wang Hao; (penalty missed) Li Shanglin; (penalty scored) Sheng Pengfei; (penalty missed) Wu Linfeng

29 October 2023 Second round	Guangzhou E-Power	1–2	Binzhou Huilong	Guangzhou
16:00 UTC+8	Xiao Zhi 68' (pen.)		26' Ma Yangyang; 45+1' Pang Zhiquan	Stadium: Guangzhou Higher Education Mega Center Central Stadium; Attendance: 4,851; Referee: Li Zheng

== Statistics ==
Players with names in italics and marked * were on loan from another club for the whole of their season with Binzhou Huilong.
Key to positions: GK – Goalkeeper; DF – Defender; MF – Midfielder; FW – Forward

No.	Pos	Nat	Player	Total		CMCL	
No.	Pos	Nat	Player	Apps	Goals	Apps	Goals
1	GK	(China) CHN	Jia Xinyao	4	0	4+0	0
2	DF	(China) CHN	Wang Zihao	7	1	4+3	1
4	DF	(China) CHN	Wang Weipu	9	1	9+0	1
5	DF	(China) CHN	Zhou Jiahao	1	0	1+0	0
6	DF	(China) CHN	Ding Jie	13	5	13+0	5
7	MF	(China) CHN	Huang Pu	6	1	3+3	1
8	MF	(China) CHN	Wen Wubin	8	1	8+0	1
9	MF	(China) CHN	Fu Jie	7	0	1+6	0
10	FW	(China) CHN	Nan Yunqi	12	6	7+5	6
11	MF	(China) CHN	Wen Shuo	5	1	0+5	1
12	DF	(China) CHN	Zhao Shuhao	12	0	9+3	0
13	FW	(China) CHN	Ma Xiaolei	9	3	7+2	3
15	MF	(China) CHN	Su Shun	9	1	7+2	1
16	DF	(China) CHN	Ma Yangyang	8	3	3+5	3
17	MF	(China) CHN	Huang Zhaoyi	1	0	1+0	0
19	MF	(China) CHN	Zhang Yuxuan	12	3	12+0	3
20	MF	(China) CHN	Xu Zhaoji	5	0	1+4	0
21	MF	(China) CHN	Chen Xing	8	0	4+4	0
22	FW	(China) CHN	He Shaolin	7	1	2+5	1
23	MF	(China) CHN	Liu Hao	3	0	0+3	0
25	GK	(China) CHN	Li Chen	10	0	10+0	0
26	DF	(China) CHN	Sun Xiaobin	12	1	12+0	1
28	FW	(China) CHN	Xi Zhenyun	2	0	1+1	0
29	DF	(China) CHN	Mi Haolun	8	2	8+0	2
30	DF	(China) CHN	Yalqunjan Mamut	2	0	1+1	0
31	DF	(China) CHN	Xu Chen	8	0	6+2	0
32	MF	(China) CHN	Xu Wu	12	2	8+4	2
33	MF	(China) CHN	Liu Tianyang	7	2	4+3	2
34	FW	(China) CHN	Pang Zhiquan	12	9	8+4	9

Players not included in matchday squads
Number	Position	Nationality	Name
27	GK	CHN	Bai Mingyu
–	RB	CHN	Nureli Tursunali
–	RB	CHN	Yang Peng

=== Goals record ===
Rank	Number	Nationality	Position	Name	CMCL	Total
1	34	(China)	ST	Pang Zhiquan	9	9
2	10	(China)	RW	Nan Yunqi	6	6
3	6	(China)	CB	Ding Jie	5	5
4	13	(China)	RW	Ma Xiaolei	3	3
4	16	(China)	RB	Ma Yangyang	3	3
4	19	(China)	CM	Zhang Yuxuan	3	3
7	29	(China)	LB	Mi Haolun	2	2
7	32	(China)	LM	Xu Wu	2	2
7	33	(China)	RM	Liu Tianyang	2	2
10	2	(China)	CB	Wang Zihao	1	1
10	4	(China)	CB	Wang Weipu	1	1
10	7	(China)	RM	Huang Pu	1	1
10	8	(China)	CM	Wen Wubin	1	1
10	11	(China)	LM	Wen Shuo	1	1
10	15	(China)	DM	Su Shun	1	1
10	22	(China)	ST	He Shaolin	1	1
10	26	(China)	CB	Sun Xiaobin	1	1
Own goals					1	1
Total					41	41

== Awards ==
=== CMCL Bronze Ball Award ===
Season	Player	Ref
2023	(China) Pang Zhiquan	

=== CMCL Bronze Glove ===
Season	Player	Ref
2023	(China) Li Chen	

=== CMCL Team of the Season ===
Season	Pos	Player	Ref
2023	DF	(China) Ding Jie	
2023	FW	(China) Pang Zhiquan	
