= Li Chen (footballer) =

Chinese association football player

Personal information
- Date of birth: 25 November 1996 (age 29)
- Place of birth: Huai'an, Jiangsu, China
- Height: 1.88 m (6 ft 2 in)
- Position: Goalkeeper

Team information
- Current team: Jiangxi Lushan
- Number: 12

Senior career*
Years	Team	Apps	(Gls)
2018–2020	Beijing Renhe	1	(0)
2021–2022	Shaanxi Chang'an Athletic	4	(0)
2023-2024	Shaanxi Union	15	(0)
2025-	Jiangxi Lushan	38	(0)
- * Club domestic league appearances and goals as of 14:01, 20 June 2026 (UTC)

Li Chen (Chinese: 李晨; pinyin: Lǐ Chén; born 25 November 1996) is a Chinese footballer currently playing as a goalkeeper for Jiangxi Lushan.

== Club career ==
Li made his Chinese FA Cup debut in unusual circumstances on 29 May 2019 in a game against Guangzhou Evergrande, coming on as an 83rd-minute substitute for Zhang Yufeng, a midfielder, despite being a goalkeeper. He played alongside fellow goalkeeper Liu Peng up front for Beijing, and was the third goalkeeper fielded by Beijing in that game, with Mou Pengfei playing in his regular position in goal.

== Career statistics ==
As of 20 June 2026.

Club	Season	League			Cup (Note: Appearances in the Chinese FA Cup)		Continental		Other		Total	
Club	Season	Division	Apps	Goals	Apps	Goals	Apps	Goals	Apps	Goals	Apps	Goals
Beijing Renhe	2018	Chinese Super League	1	0	0	0	-		-		0	0
Beijing Renhe	2019	Chinese Super League	0	0	1	0	-		-		1	0
Beijing Renhe	2020	China League One	0	0	0	0	-		-		0	0
Beijing Renhe	Total		1	0	1	0	0	0	0	0	2	0
Shaanxi Chang'an Athletic	2021	China League One	3	0	1	0	-		-		4	0
Shaanxi Chang'an Athletic	2022	China League One	1	0	1	0	-		-		2	0
Shaanxi Chang'an Athletic	Total		4	0	2	0	0	0	0	0	6	0
Shaanxi Union	2023	CMCL	10	0	-		-		-		10	0
Shaanxi Union	2024	China League Two	5	0	2	0	-		-		7	0
Shaanxi Union	Total		15	0	2	0	0	0	0	0	17	0
Jiangxi Lushan	2025	China League Two	27	0	2	0	-		-		29	0
Jiangxi Lushan	2026	China League Two	11	0	2	0	-		-		13	0
Jiangxi Lushan	Total		38	0	4	0	0	0	0	0	42	0
Career total			58	0	9	0	0	0	0	0	67	0

== Honours ==
Shaanxi Chang'an Union

- CMCL play-offs: 2023
