= Wen Shuo =

Chinese association football player

Personal information
- Date of birth: 5 January 1991 (age 35)
- Place of birth: Xi'an, Shaanxi, China
- Height: 1.82 m (6 ft 0 in)
- Position: Right winger

Youth career
- –2010: Shandong Luneng

Senior career*
Years	Team	Apps	(Gls)
2010–2012	Mafra	16	(0)
2012	Guangzhou R&F	0	(0)
2013–2017	Yunnan Flying Tigers	33	(5)
2018–2022	Shaanxi Chang'an Athletic	31	(3)
2023-2024	Shaanxi Union	11	(1)
- * Club domestic league appearances and goals as of 14:01, 26 July 2021 (UTC)

Wen Shuo (Chinese: 文烁; born 5 January 1991) is a Chinese former footballer who played as a right winger.

== Career statistics ==
=== Club ===
As of 25 July 2021.

Club	Season	League			Cup		Continental		Other		Total	
Club	Season	Division	Apps	Goals	Apps	Goals	Apps	Goals	Apps	Goals	Apps	Goals
Mafra	2010–11	Segunda Divisão	9	0	0	0	–		0	0	4	0
Mafra	2011–12	Segunda Divisão	7	0	0	0	–		0	0	4	0
Mafra	Total		16	0	0	0	0	0	0	0	16	0
Guangzhou R&F	2012	Chinese Super League	0	0	0	0	–		0	0	0	0
Yunnan Flying Tigers	2013	China League Two	–		0	0	–		0	0	0	0
Yunnan Flying Tigers	2014	China League Two	–		2 (Note: Appearances in the Chinese FA Cup)	0	–		0	0	2	0
Yunnan Flying Tigers	2015	China League Two	6	0	1	1	–		1 (Note: Appearances in the China League Two playoffs)	0	8	1
Yunnan Flying Tigers	2016	China League Two	18	4	3	0	–		5	1	26	5
Yunnan Flying Tigers	2017	China League One	20	0	0	0	–		0	0	20	0
Yunnan Flying Tigers	Total		44	4	6	1	0	0	6	1	56	6
Shaanxi Chang'an Athletic	2018	China League Two	19	3	2	0	–		5	0	26	3
Shaanxi Chang'an Athletic	2019	China League One	3	0	1	0	–		0	0	4	0
Shaanxi Chang'an Athletic	2020	China League One	2	0	0	0	–		0	0	2	0
Shaanxi Chang'an Athletic	2021	China League One	1	0	0	0	–		0	0	1	0
Shaanxi Chang'an Athletic	Total		25	3	3	0	0	0	5	0	33	3
Career total			85	7	9	1	0	0	11	1	105	9

== Honours ==
Shaanxi Chang'an Union

- CMCL play-offs: 2023
