= Xu Zhaoji =

Chinese association football player

Personal information
- Date of birth: 9 March 1998 (age 28)
- Place of birth: Dalian, Liaoning, China
- Height: 1.66 m (5 ft 5 in)
- Position: Midfielder

Team information
- Current team: Shijiazhuang Gongfu
- Number: 23

Youth career
- 2016: Chongqing High Wave
- 2018: Shenyang Dongjin

Senior career*
Years	Team	Apps	(Gls)
2019–2020	Lhasa UCI	23	(0)
2020–2021	Suzhou Dongwu	5	(0)
2021–2022	Shaanxi Chang'an Athletic	19	(0)
2023	Shaanxi Union	5	(0)
2024	Hunan Billows	1	(0)
2024	Xi'an Chongde Ronghai	8	(0)
2025	Jiangxi Lushan	2	(0)
2025	Changchun Xidu	11	(0)
2026–	Shijiazhuang Gongfu	0	(0)
- * Club domestic league appearances and goals as of 9 March 2026

Xu Zhaoji (Chinese: 许兆基; born 9 March 1998) is a Chinese footballer currently playing as a midfielder for Shijiazhuang Gongfu.

== Career statistics ==
=== Club ===
As of 05 August 2024.

Club	Season	League			Cup		Continental		Other		Total	
Club	Season	Division	Apps	Goals	Apps	Goals	Apps	Goals	Apps	Goals	Apps	Goals
Lhasa UCI	2019	China League Two	25	1	2	0	–		–		27	1
Suzhou Dongwu	2020	China League One	5	0	0	0	–		–		5	0
Shaanxi Chang'an Athletic	2021	China League One	5	0	1	0	–		–		6	0
Shaanxi Chang'an Athletic	2022	China League One	14	0	1	0	–		–		15	0
Shaanxi Chang'an Athletic	Total		19	0	2	0	0	0	0	0	21	0
Shaanxi Union	2023	Chinese Champions League	5	0	–		–		–		5	0
Hunan Billows	2024	China League Two	1	0	1	0	–		–		2	0
Xi'an Chongde Ronghai	2024	China League Two	3	0	0	0	–		–		3	0
Career total			58	1	5	0	0	0	0	0	63	1

== Honours ==
Shaanxi Chang'an Union

- CMCL play-offs: 2023
