= Wang Weipu =

Chinese association football player

Personal information
- Date of birth: 26 November 1993 (age 32)
- Place of birth: Shenyang, Liaoning, China
- Height: 1.82 m (6 ft 0 in)
- Position: Midfielder

Team information
- Current team: Changchun Yatai (on loan from Shaanxi Union)
- Number: 4

Youth career
- –2013: Liaoning FC

Senior career*
Years	Team	Apps	(Gls)
2013–2014	Liaoning FC	0	(0)
2015	Shenyang Zhongze		
2015	Hebei Elite	6	(1)
2016–2019	Liaoning Shenyang Urban	66	(8)
2020–2022	Shaanxi Chang'an Athletic	40	(2)
2023	Wuxi Wugou	1	(0)
2023–	Shaanxi Union	42	(2)
2026–	→ Changchun Yatai (loan)	8	(0)
- * Club domestic league appearances and goals as of 14:01, 26 July 2021 (UTC)

Wang Weipu (Chinese: 王维朴; born 26 November 1993) is a Chinese footballer currently playing as a midfielder for China League One club Changchun Yatai, on loan from Shaanxi Union.

On 10 July 2026, Wang was loaned out to China League One club Changchun Yatai for the rest of 2026 season.

== Career statistics ==
=== Club ===
As of 25 July 2021.

Club	Season	League			Cup		Continental		Other		Total	
Club	Season	Division	Apps	Goals	Apps	Goals	Apps	Goals	Apps	Goals	Apps	Goals
Liaoning FC	2013	Chinese Super League	0	0	1 (Note: Appearances in the Chinese FA Cup)	0	–		0	0	1	0
Liaoning FC	2014	Chinese Super League	0	0	0	0	–		0	0	0	0
Liaoning FC	Total		0	0	1	0	0	0	0	0	1	0
Hebei Elite	2015	China League Two	6	1	1	0	–		1 (Note: Appearances in the China League Two playoffs)	0	8	1
Liaoning Shenyang Urban	2016	China League Two	12	1	2	0	–		2	0	16	1
Liaoning Shenyang Urban	2017	China League Two	20	3	0	0	–		2	1	22	4
Liaoning Shenyang Urban	2018	China League Two	19	1	0	0	–		2	0	21	1
Liaoning Shenyang Urban	2019	China League Two	15	3	1	0	–		0	0	16	3
Liaoning Shenyang Urban	Total		66	8	3	0	0	0	6	1	75	9
Shaanxi Chang'an Athletic	2020	China League One	9	0	0	0	–		0	0	9	0
Shaanxi Chang'an Athletic	2021	China League One	11	0	0	0	–		0	0	11	0
Shaanxi Chang'an Athletic	Total		20	0	0	0	0	0	0	0	20	0
Career total			92	9	5	0	0	0	7	1	104	10

== Honours ==
Shaanxi Chang'an Union

- CMCL play-offs: 2023
