= Su Shun =

Su Shun may refer to:

- Su Shun (Xiaoshan) (蘇順), style name Xiaoshan (孝山), Eastern Han Dynasty scholar
- Sushun (肅順; 1816–1861), style name Yuting (雨亭), Qing Dynasty noble and regent
- Su Shun (footballer) (苏顺; born 1994), Chinese male footballer
