= Chen Xing (footballer, born 2000) =

Chinese association football player

Personal information
- Date of birth: 29 March 2000 (age 26)
- Place of birth: Guangzhou, Guangdong, China
- Height: 1.78 m (5 ft 10 in)
- Position: Midfielder

Youth career
- Atlético Madrid
- –2019: Meizhou Hakka

Senior career*
Years	Team	Apps	(Gls)
2019–2022	Meizhou Hakka	9	(1)
2022	→ Shaanxi Chang'an Athletic (Loan)	8	(2)
2023–2024	Shaanxi Union	12	(0)
2025	Guangzhou Dandelion Alpha	17	(1)
- * Club domestic league appearances and goals as of 14:01, 24 December 2023 (UTC)

Chen Xing (simplified Chinese: 陈兴; traditional Chinese: 陳興; pinyin: Chén Xìng; born 29 March 2000) is a Chinese footballer currently playing as a midfielder.

== Club career ==
Chen Xing would be promoted to the senior team of Meizhou Hakka and go on to make professional debut in a league game on 20 July 2019 against Guizhou Hengfeng in a 2-0 defeat. This would be followed by his first goal of his career on 26 October 2019 against Liaoning that ended in a 3-2 victory. He would be a squad player as the club gained promotion to the top tier after coming second within the division at the end of the 2021 China League One campaign. On 31 August 2022 he would be loaned out to second tier club Shaanxi Chang'an Athletic for the remainder of the season.

== Career statistics ==
As of 16 December 2022.

Club	Season	League			Cup		Continental		Other		Total	
Club	Season	Division	Apps	Goals	Apps	Goals	Apps	Goals	Apps	Goals	Apps	Goals
Meizhou Hakka	2019	China League One	7	1	0	0	–		–		7	1
Meizhou Hakka	2020	China League One	2	0	1	0	–		–		3	0
Meizhou Hakka	2021	China League One	0	0	1	0	–		–		1	0
Meizhou Hakka	2022	Chinese Super League	0	0	0	0	–		–		0	0
Meizhou Hakka	Total		9	1	2	0	0	0	0	0	6	0
Shaanxi Chang'an Athletic (Loan)	2022	China League One	8	2	1	0	–		–		9	2
Career total			17	3	3	0	0	0	0	0	20	3

== Honours ==
Shaanxi Chang'an Union

- CMCL play-offs: 2023
