= Xu Chen (footballer) =

Chinese footballer (born 1991)

Personal information
- Date of birth: 11 November 1989 (age 36)
- Place of birth: Dalian, Liaoning, China
- Height: 1.83 m (6 ft 0 in)
- Position: Forward

Team information
- Current team: Jiangxi Beidamen
- Number: 19

Senior career*
Years	Team	Apps	(Gls)
2013	Beijing Baxy	0	(0)
2014–	Jiangxi Beidamen		
- * Club domestic league appearances and goals as of 14:01, 24 August 2021 (UTC)

Xu Chen (Chinese: 徐辰; born 11 November 1991) is a Chinese footballer currently playing as a forward for Jiangxi Beidamen.

== Career statistics ==
=== Club ===
As of 24 August 2021.

Club	Season	League			Cup		Other		Total	
Club	Season	Division	Apps	Goals	Apps	Goals	Apps	Goals	Apps	Goals
Beijing Baxy	2013	China League One	0	0	1 (Note: Appearances in the Chinese FA Cup)	0	0	0	1	0
Jiangxi Beidamen	2014	China League Two	–		0	0	0	0	0	0
Jiangxi Beidamen	2015	China League One	2	0	0	0	0	0	2	0
Jiangxi Beidamen	2016	China League Two	11	0	1	0	5 (Note: Appearances in the China League Two playoffs)	1	17	1
Jiangxi Beidamen	2017	China League Two	14	1	1	1	2	0	17	2
Jiangxi Beidamen	2018	China League Two	24	2	0	0	2	0	26	2
Jiangxi Beidamen	2019	China League Two	27	2	1	0	4	0	32	2
Jiangxi Beidamen	2020	China League One	4	0	0	0	0	0	4	0
Jiangxi Beidamen	2021	China League One	6	0	0	0	0	0	6	0
Jiangxi Beidamen	Total		88	5	3	0	13	1	104	7
Career total			88	5	4	0	13	1	105	7

== Honours ==
Shaanxi Chang'an Union

- CMCL play-offs: 2023
