= Sun Xiaobin =

Chinese association football player

Personal information
- Date of birth: 16 February 1999 (age 27)
- Place of birth: Bozhou, Anhui, China
- Height: 1.86 m (6 ft 1 in)
- Position: Central defender

Team information
- Current team: Meizhou Hakka
- Number: 29

Youth career
- –2016: Shandong Taishan
- 2017–2020: Shenzhen FC

Senior career*
Years	Team	Apps	(Gls)
2021–2022	Zibo Cuju	51	(0)
2023–2024	Shaanxi Union	17	(1)
2024	→ Shenzhen Juniors	9	(1)
2025	Foshan Nanshi	26	(0)
2026–	Meizhou Hakka	0	(0)
- * Club domestic league appearances and goals as of 12 March 2026

Sun Xiaobin (Chinese: 孙晓彬; born 16 February 1999) is a Chinese footballer currently playing as a central defender for China League One club Meizhou Hakka.

== Club career ==
Sun Xiaobin played for the Shandong Taishan and then the Shenzhen FC youth teams. On April 11, 2021, Sun joined second tier team Zibo Cuju on a free transfer. This would be followed by his debut in June 04, 2021, in a league game against Meizhou Hakka in a 4-0 defeat. After two seasons with the club he established himself as a regular within the team. At the end of the 2022 league campaign Zibo Cuju were in financial difficulties and were disbanded.

Sun Xiaobin joined forth tier club Shaanxi Union for the 2023 league campaign. With them he gained promotion at the end of the season. The following campaign he was allowed to join another third tier club, Shenzhen Juniors half way through the season.

On January 28, 2025, Foshan Nanshi officially announced the signing of Sun Xiaobin.

On March 5, 2026, Meizhou Hakka officially announced the signing of Sun Xiaobin.

== Career statistics ==
=== Club ===
As of match played 12 March 2026.

Club	Season	League			Cup		Continental		Other		Total	
Club	Season	Division	Apps	Goals	Apps	Goals	Apps	Goals	Apps	Goals	Apps	Goals
Zibo Cuju	2021	China League One	20	0	2	0	–		–		22	0
Zibo Cuju	2022	China League One	31	0	2	0	–		–		33	0
Zibo Cuju	Total		51	0	4	0	0	0	0	0	55	0
Shaanxi Union	2023	Chinese Champions League	12	1	–		–		–		12	1
Shaanxi Union	2024	China League Two	4	0	1	0	–		–		5	0
Shaanxi Union	Total		17	1	1	0	0	0	0	0	18	1
Shenzhen Juniors (loan)	2024	China League Two	9	1	–		–		–		9	1
Foshan Nanshi	2025	China League One	26	0	1	0	–		–		27	0
Career total			103	2	6	0	0	0	0	0	109	2

== Honours ==
Shaanxi Chang'an Union

- CMCL play-offs: 2023
