= Pang Zhiquan =

Chinese footballer

Pang Zhiquan 逄志泉
Personal information
- Full name: Pang Zhiquan
- Date of birth: 16 August 1990 (age 36)
- Place of birth: Qingdao, Shandong, China
- Height: 1.95 m (6 ft 5 in)
- Position: Forward

Team information
- Current team: Tai'an Tiankuang

Senior career*
Years	Team	Apps	(Gls)
2009–2013	Qingdao Jonoon	11	(0)
2014–2018	Guizhou Zhicheng	52	(6)
2018–2022	Shaanxi Chang'an Athletic	60	(11)
2023–2025	Shaanxi Union	31	(14)
2025–2026	Dalian Hanyu	0	(0)
2026–	Tai'an Tiankuang	13	(3)
- * Club domestic league appearances and goals as of 29 July 2026

Pang Zhiquan (Chinese: 逄志泉; pinyin: Páng Zhìquán; born 16 August 1990) is a Chinese professional footballer who plays as a striker for China League Two club Tai'an Tiankuang.

== Club career ==
Pang Zhiquan started his professional football career in 2009 when he joined Qingdao Jonoon for the 2009 Chinese Super League campaign. On 3 May 2010, he made his debut for Qingdao Jonoon in the 2010 Chinese Super League against Beijing Guoan, coming on as a substitute for Aleksander Rodić in the 88th minute.

In March 2014, Pang transferred to China League Two side Guizhou Zhicheng. On 13 July 2018, Pang transferred to Shaanxi Chang'an Athletic.

== Career statistics ==
Statistics accurate as of match played 29 July 2026.

Appearances and goals by club, season and competition
Club	Season	League			National Cup		Continental		Other		Total	
Club	Season	Division	Apps	Goals	Apps	Goals	Apps	Goals	Apps	Goals	Apps	Goals
Qingdao Jonoon	2009	Chinese Super League	0	0	-		-		-		0	0
Qingdao Jonoon	2010	Chinese Super League	7	0	-		-		-		7	0
Qingdao Jonoon	2011	Chinese Super League	1	0	1	0	-		-		2	0
Qingdao Jonoon	2012	Chinese Super League	3	0	2	1	-		-		5	1
Qingdao Jonoon	2013	Chinese Super League	0	0	0	0	-		-		0	0
Qingdao Jonoon	Total		11	0	3	1	0	0	0	0	14	1
Guizhou Zhicheng	2014	China League Two	12	1	1	2	-		-		13	3
Guizhou Zhicheng	2015	China League One	14	1	2	1	-		-		16	2
Guizhou Zhicheng	2016	China League One	18	4	1	0	-		-		19	4
Guizhou Zhicheng	2017	Chinese Super League	8	0	1	0	-		-		9	0
Guizhou Zhicheng	Total		52	6	5	3	0	0	0	0	57	9
Shaanxi Chang'an Athletic	2018	China League Two	18	3	0	0	-		-		16	3
Shaanxi Chang'an Athletic	2019	China League One	4	0	2	0	-		-		6	0
Shaanxi Chang'an Athletic	2021	China League One	10	0	3	0	-		-		13	0
Shaanxi Chang'an Athletic	2022	China League One	28	8	0	0	-		-		28	8
Shaanxi Chang'an Athletic	Total		60	11	5	0	0	0	0	0	65	11
Shaanxi Union	2023	CMCL	12	9	-		-		-		12	9
Shaanxi Union	2024	China League Two	19	5	1	0	-		-		20	5
Shaanxi Union	Total		31	14	1	0	0	0	0	0	32	14
Dalian Hanyu	2025	CMCL	0	0	-		-		-		0	0
Tai'an Tiankuang	2026	China League Two	13	3	1	0	-		-		14	3
Career total			167	34	15	4	0	0	0	0	182	38

== Honours ==
Shaanxi Chang'an Union

- CMCL play-offs: 2023
