= He Shaolin =

Chinese association football player

Personal information
- Date of birth: 28 February 2003 (age 23)
- Place of birth: Lijiang, Yunnan, China
- Height: 1.90 m (6 ft 3 in)
- Position: Forward

Team information
- Current team: Shanghai Second (on loan from Shenzhen Peng City)
- Number: 22

Youth career
- Lijiang Yuanheng
- 2017–2019: Yunnan Kunlu
- 2024: Shenzhen Peng City

Senior career*
Years	Team	Apps	(Gls)
2019	Yunnan Kunlu	9	(0)
2020–2022	Guangzhou FC	0	(0)
2020	→ China U19 (loan)	2	(0)
2021	→ China U20 (loan)	5	(0)
2023	Shaanxi Union	7	(1)
2024–	Shenzhen Peng City	0	(0)
2025	→ Jiangxi Dingnan United (loan)	14	(1)
2026	→ Shanghai Second (loan)	14	(3)
- * Club domestic league appearances and goals as of 14:01, 5 July 2026 (UTC) ‡ National team caps and goals as of 14:01, 27 January 2023 (UTC)

He Shaolin (Chinese: 和韶麟; born 28 February 2003) is a Chinese footballer currently playing as a forward.

== Club career ==
Born in Lijiang, Yunnan, He started playing football at the age of eight. His first club was Lijiang Yuanheng. He joined Yunnan Kunlu in 2017, and a year later he travelled to Portugal to train with professional side Cova da Piedade, alongside teammate Yang Xinle. In 2019, he travelled to both Croatia and Russia, training with Spartak Moscow for three months.

On his return to China, he became the youngest player in the 2019 China League Two, making his debut on 13 July against Kunshan FC. At the end of the season, he agreed a deal with Chinese Super League side Guangzhou FC.

== Personal life ==
He is of Nakhi ethnicity.

== Career statistics ==
=== Club ===
As of 5 July 2026.

Club	Season	League			Cup (Note: Appearances in the Chinese FA Cup)		Continental		Other		Total	
Club	Season	Division	Apps	Goals	Apps	Goals	Apps	Goals	Apps	Goals	Apps	Goals
Yunnan Kunlu	2019	China League Two	9	0	0	0	–		–		9	0
Guangzhou FC	2020	Chinese Super League	0	0	0	0	0 (Note: Appearances in the AFC Champions League)	0	–		0	0
Guangzhou FC	2021	Chinese Super League	0	0	0	0	2	0	–		2	0
Guangzhou FC	2022	Chinese Super League	0	0	0	0	2	0	–		2	0
Guangzhou FC	Total		0	0	0	0	4	0	0	0	4	0
China U19 (loan)	2020	China League Two	2	0	0	0	–		–		2	0
China U20 (loan)	2021	China League Two	5	0	1	0	–		–		6	0
Shaanxi Union	2023	CMCL	7	1	–		–		–		7	1
Shenzhen Peng City	2024	Chinese Super League	0	0	0	0	–		–		0	0
Jiangxi Dingnan United (loan)	2025	China League One	14	1	2	0	–		–		16	1
Shanghai Second (loan)	2026	China League Two	14	3	4	2	–		–		18	5
Career total			51	5	7	2	4	0	0	0	62	7

== Honours ==
Shaanxi Chang'an Union

- CMCL play-offs: 2023
