= Ding Jie =

Chinese footballer

Ding Jie 丁捷
Personal information
- Date of birth: 29 April 1987 (age 39)
- Place of birth: Dalian, Liaoning, China
- Height: 1.82 m (5 ft 11 1/2 in)
- Positions: Midfielder; centre-back

Youth career
- Dalian Yiteng
- Liaoning FC

Senior career*
Years	Team	Apps	(Gls)
2005–2015	Liaoning FC	180	(16)
2016–2023	Chongqing Lifan	85	(8)
2020	→ Zhejiang Yiteng (loan)	8	(2)
2021	→ Shaanxi Chang'an Athletic (loan)	31	(3)
2022	→ Shaanxi Chang'an Athletic (loan)	27	(0)
2023–2024	Shaanxi Union	30	(6)
- * Club domestic league appearances and goals as of 31 December 2025

Ding Jie (Chinese: 丁捷; pinyin: Dīng Jié; born 29 April 1987) is a Chinese former professional footballer who played as a midfielder or centre-back.

On 10 September 2024, Chinese Football Association announced that Ding was banned from football-related activities for lifetime for involving in match-fixing.

== Club career ==
Ding Jie was drafted into the senior side of Liaoning FC during the 2005 league season and would make his league debut on 4 September 2005 against Beijing Guoan in a game where he also scored the winning goal in a 3–2 victory. After making his debut he was used sparingly and only started to become a consistent regular during the 2007 league season when he had a personally impressive showing, scoring six goals in nineteen league appearances. Now a regular within the side Ding Jie would unfortunately be part of the squad that saw the club relegated to the second tier at the end of the 2008 league season. Despite this disappointment Ding remained with the club and would immediately aid them in their promotion push that saw the team win the division title and promotion back to the top tier.

On 2 January 2016, Ding transferred to fellow Chinese Super League side Chongqing Lifan.

== Career statistics ==
Statistics accurate as of match played 31 December 2025.

Appearances and goals by club, season and competition
Club	Season	League			National Cup		League Cup		Continental		Total	
Club	Season	Division	Apps	Goals	Apps	Goals	Apps	Goals	Apps	Goals	Apps	Goals
Liaoning FC	2005	Chinese Super League	4	1		0		0	-		4	1
Liaoning FC	2006	Chinese Super League	5	0		0	-		-		5	0
Liaoning FC	2007	Chinese Super League	19	6	-		-		-		19	6
Liaoning FC	2008	Chinese Super League	23	2	-		-		-		23	2
Liaoning FC	2009	China League One	19	4	-		-		-		19	4
Liaoning FC	2010	Chinese Super League	27	1	-		-		-		27	1
Liaoning FC	2011	Chinese Super League	14	1	0	0	-		-		14	1
Liaoning FC	2012	Chinese Super League	26	0	2	0	-		-		28	0
Liaoning FC	2013	Chinese Super League	8	0	0	0	-		-		8	0
Liaoning FC	2014	Chinese Super League	10	1	0	0	-		-		10	1
Liaoning FC	2015	Chinese Super League	25	0	1	0	-		-		26	0
Liaoning FC	Total		180	16	3	0	0	0	0	0	183	16
Chongqing Lifan	2016	Chinese Super League	26	2	0	0	-		-		26	2
Chongqing Lifan	2017	Chinese Super League	17	3	0	0	-		-		17	3
Chongqing Lifan	2018	Chinese Super League	24	3	1	0	-		-		25	3
Chongqing Lifan	2019	Chinese Super League	18	0	1	0	-		-		19	0
Chongqing Lifan	Total		85	8	2	0	0	0	0	0	87	8
Zhejiang Yiteng (loan)	2020	China League Two	8	2	0	0	-		-		8	2
Shaanxi Chang'an Athletic (loan)	2021	China League One	31	3	2	0	-		-		33	3
Shaanxi Chang'an Athletic (loan)	2022	China League One	27	0	0	0	-		-		27	0
Shaanxi Union	2023	CMCL	13	5	-		-		-		13	5
Shaanxi Union	2024	China League Two	17	1	2	1	-		-		19	2
Shaanxi Union	Total		30	6	2	1	0	0	0	0	32	7
Career total			361	35	9	1	0	0	0	0	370	36

== Honours ==
=== Club ===
Liaoning FC

- China League One: 2009

Shaanxi Chang'an Union

- CMCL play-offs: 2023
