= Zhao Shuhao =

Chinese association football player

Personal information
- Date of birth: 18 January 1998 (age 28)
- Place of birth: Zhoukou, Henan, China
- Height: 1.75 m (5 ft 9 in)
- Position: Left-back

Team information
- Current team: Shijiazhuang Gongfu
- Number: 6

Youth career
- –2017: Hebei Zhuoao

Senior career*
Years	Team	Apps	(Gls)
2017–2020	Hebei Zhuoao	49	(0)
2021	Wuhan Three Towns	3	(0)
2022	Nantong Zhiyun	1	(0)
2022	→ Shijiazhuang Gongfu (loan)	11	(0)
2023–2024	Shaanxi Union	22	(0)
2024	→ Wuxi Wugo (loan)	9	(0)
2025	Dalian K'un City	17	(0)
2026–	Shijiazhuang Gongfu	0	(0)
- * Club domestic league appearances and goals as of 14:01, 21 July 2024 (UTC)

Zhao Shuhao (Chinese: 赵舒豪; born 18 January 1998) is a Chinese footballer currently playing as a left-back for Shijiazhuang Gongfu.

== Club career ==
Born in Dancheng County, Henan, Zhao studied football in Brazil between 2012 and 2015.

On 25 March 2021 he transferred to second tier club Wuhan Three Towns for the 2021 China League One campaign.

== Career statistics ==
=== Club ===
As of 21 July 2024.

Club	Season	League			Cup		Continental		Other		Total	
Club	Season	Division	Apps	Goals	Apps	Goals	Apps	Goals	Apps	Goals	Apps	Goals
Hebei Zhuoao	2017	China League Two	3	0	0	0	-		-		3	0
Hebei Zhuoao	2018	China League Two	10	0	1	0	-		-		11	0
Hebei Zhuoao	2019	China League Two	29	0	4	0	-		-		33	0
Hebei Zhuoao	2020	China League Two	7	0	-		-		-		7	0
Hebei Zhuoao	Total		49	0	5	0	0	0	0	0	54	0
Wuhan Three Towns	2021	China League One	3	0	2	0	-		-		5	0
Nantong Zhiyun	2022	China League One	1	0	0	0	-		-		1	0
Shijiazhuang Gongfu (Loan)	2022	China League One	11	0	1	0	-		-		12	0
Binzhou Huilong/Shaanxi Union	2023	CMCL	12	0	-		-		-		12	0
Binzhou Huilong/Shaanxi Union	2024	China League Two	10	0	3	0	-		-		13	0
Binzhou Huilong/Shaanxi Union	Total		22	0	3	0	0	0	0	0	25	0
Wuxi Wugo (Loan)	2024	China League One	1	0	1	0	-		-		2	0
Career total			87	0	12	0	0	0	0	0	99	0

== Honours ==
Wuhan Three Towns

- China League One: 2021

Shaanxi Union

- CMCL play-offs: 2023
