= Zhang Yuxuan (footballer) =

Chinese association football player

Personal information
- Date of birth: 24 January 1995 (age 31)
- Place of birth: Zhengzhou, Henan, China
- Height: 1.83 m (6 ft 0 in)
- Position: Midfielder

Team information
- Current team: Xiamen Feilu
- Number: 19

Youth career
- 2003–2007: Henan Jianye
- 2008–2011: Shaanxi Chanba
- 2013: Shaanxi FA

Senior career*
Years	Team	Apps	(Gls)
2014–2017	Beijing Renhe	0	(0)
2014–2015	→ Nei Mongol Zhongyou (loan)	0	(0)
2018–2019	Aves	0	(0)
2018–2019	→ Montalegre (loan)	4	(0)
2019–2020	Vilar de Perdizes	12	(1)
2020–2022	Shaanxi Chang'an Athletic	34	(1)
2023–2026	Shaanxi Union	36	(4)
2024	→ Guangxi Hengchen (loan)	9	(2)
2026–	Xiamen Feilu	6	(2)
- * Club domestic league appearances and goals as of 02:07, 16 August 2026 (UTC)

Zhang Yuxuan (Chinese: 张裕碹; pinyin: Zhāng Yùxuàn; born 24 January 1995) is a Chinese footballer currently playing as a midfielder for China League Two club Xiamen Feilu.

== Club career ==
Zhang joined the academy of Henan Jianye in 2003, before a move to Shaanxi Chanba in 2008. He spent time studying in Portugal between 2011 and 2013, and also represented the Shaanxi provincial side in 2013.

In 2014, having returned to Chinese Super League side Shaanxi Chanba, now known as Beijing Renhe, he was loaned to Taiyuan Zhongyou Jiayi, and continued this loan into 2015, when the club was renamed Nei Mongol Zhongyou. He returned to Portugal in 2018, signing with Aves, before immediately being loaned to Campeonato de Portugal side Montalegre, where he made four appearances.

On his return to China, Zhang went on trial with former clubs Beijing Renhe and Henan Jianye. Despite impressing on trial with the latter, including scoring in a friendly match against Tianjin TEDA, he was not offered a contract, as Henan Jianye had a lot of players in his position, and he did not have the advantage of being an under-23 player.

He then spent over 73 days on trial with Shaanxi Chang'an Athletic, from April to July 2020. He was eventually offered a contract, and signed with the club on 31 July 2020.

== Career statistics ==
=== Club ===
As of 16 August 2026.

Appearances and goals by club, season and competition
Club	Season	League			Cup		Other		Total	
Club	Season	Division	Apps	Goals	Apps	Goals	Apps	Goals	Apps	Goals
Beijing Renhe	2014	Chinese Super League	0	0	0	0	-		0	0
Beijing Renhe	2015	Chinese Super League	0	0	1 (Note: Appearances in the Chinese FA Cup)	0	-		1	0
Beijing Renhe	2016	China League One	0	0	2	0	-		2	0
Beijing Renhe	2017	China League One	0	0	0	0	-		0	0
Beijing Renhe	Total		0	0	3	0	0	0	3	0
Nei Mongol Zhongyou (loan)	2015	China League One	0	0	0	0	-		0	0
Aves	2018–19	Primeira Liga	0	0	0	0	-		0	0
Montalegre (loan)	2018–19	Campeonato de Portugal	4	0	0	0	-		4	0
Vilar de Perdizes	2019–20	Honra Vila Real	12	1	0	0	-		12	1
Shaanxi Chang'an Athletic	2020	China League One	7	0	0	0	-		0	0
Shaanxi Chang'an Athletic	2021	China League One	16	1	1	0	-		17	1
Shaanxi Chang'an Athletic	2022	China League One	11	0	0	0	-		11	0
Shaanxi Chang'an Athletic	Total		34	1	1	0	0	0	35	1
Shaanxi Union	2023	CMCL	12	3	-		-		12	3
Shaanxi Union	2024	China League Two	12	1	2	0	-		14	1
Shaanxi Union	2025	China League One	12	0	3	1	-		15	1
Shaanxi Union	Total		36	4	5	1	0	0	41	5
Guangxi Hengchen (loan)	2024	China League Two	9	2	0	0	-		9	2
Xiamen Feilu	2026	China League Two	6	2	0	0	-		6	2
Career total			101	10	9	1	0	0	110	11

== Honours ==
Shaanxi Chang'an Union

- CMCL play-offs: 2023
