= Ma Yangyang =

Chinese association football player

Personal information
- Date of birth: 20 February 1998 (age 28)
- Place of birth: Taihe County, Anhui, China
- Height: 1.74 m (5 ft 9 in)
- Position: Defender

Team information
- Current team: Changchun Xidu

Youth career
- –2018: Beijing Renhe

Senior career*
Years	Team	Apps	(Gls)
2019–2021	Shaanxi Chang'an Athletic	36	(0)
2022	Zibo Qisheng	9	(1)
2023–2024	Shaanxi Union	12	(2)
2025–2026	Tai'an Tiankuang	23	(0)
2026–	Changchun Xidu	0	(0)
- * Club domestic league appearances and goals as of 22:16, 11 March 2026 (UTC)

Ma Yangyang (Chinese: 马洋洋; born 20 February 1998) is a Chinese footballer currently playing as a defender for China League Two club Changchun Xidu.

== Career statistics ==
=== Club ===
As of 27 July 2021.

Club	Season	League			Cup		Continental		Other		Total	
Club	Season	Division	Apps	Goals	Apps	Goals	Apps	Goals	Apps	Goals	Apps	Goals
Shaanxi Chang'an Athletic	2019	China League One	23	0	2 (Note: Appearances in the Chinese FA Cup)	0	–		0	0	25	0
Shaanxi Chang'an Athletic	2020	China League One	5	0	0	0	–		0	0	5	0
Shaanxi Chang'an Athletic	2021	China League One	1	0	0	0	–		0	0	1	0
Career total			29	0	2	0	0	0	0	0	31	0

== Honours ==
Shaanxi Chang'an Union

- CMCL play-offs: 2023
