= Su Shun (footballer) =

Chinese association football player

Personal information
- Date of birth: 9 March 1994 (age 32)
- Place of birth: Tianjin, China
- Height: 1.78 m (5 ft 10 in)
- Position: Midfielder

Team information
- Current team: Shanxi Chongde Ronghai
- Number: 37

Youth career
- –2010: Tianjin TEDA
- 2011–2013: Shanghai Shenhua

Senior career*
Years	Team	Apps	(Gls)
2013–2017	Shanghai Shenhua	0	(0)
2013	→ Dali Ruilong (loan)		
2015–2016	→ Atlético Museros (loan)	11	(0)
2016–2017	→ Felgueiras 1932 B (loan)		
2017–2018	Yunnan Flying Tigers	49	(5)
2019–2020	Hebei Zhuoao	15	(1)
2021–2022	Shaanxi Chang'an Athletic	8	(0)
2023	Shaanxi Union	0	(0)
2024-	Shanxi Chongde Ronghai	49	(2)
- * Club domestic league appearances and goals as of 14:01, 27 July 2021 (UTC)

Su Shun (Chinese: 苏顺; born 9 March 1994) is a Chinese footballer currently playing as a midfielder for Shanxi Chongde Ronghai.

== Career statistics ==
=== Club ===
As of 27 July 2021.

Club	Season	League			Cup		Continental		Other		Total	
Club	Season	Division	Apps	Goals	Apps	Goals	Apps	Goals	Apps	Goals	Apps	Goals
Shanghai Shenhua	2013	Chinese Super League	0	0	0	0	–		0	0	0	0
Shanghai Shenhua	2014	Chinese Super League	0	0	0	0	–		0	0	0	0
Shanghai Shenhua	2015	Chinese Super League	0	0	0	0	–		0	0	0	0
Shanghai Shenhua	2016	Chinese Super League	0	0	0	0	–		0	0	0	0
Shanghai Shenhua	2017	Chinese Super League	0	0	0	0	–		0	0	0	0
Shanghai Shenhua	Total		0	0	0	0	0	0	0	0	0	0
Atlético Museros (loan)	2015–2016	Regional Preferente Valenciana	11	0	0	0	–		0	0	11	0
Yunnan Flying Tigers	2017	China League One	26	2	1 (Note: Appearances in the Chinese FA Cup)	0	–		0	0	27	2
Yunnan Flying Tigers	2019	China League Two	23	3	0	0	–		1 (Note: Appearances in the China League Two playoffs)	0	24	3
Yunnan Flying Tigers	Total		49	5	1	0	0	0	1	0	51	5
Hebei Zhuoao	2020	China League Two	10	0	2	0	–		1	0	13	0
Hebei Zhuoao	2020	China League Two	5	1	0	0	–		0	0	5	1
Hebei Zhuoao	Total		15	1	2	0	0	0	1	0	18	1
Shaanxi Chang'an Athletic	2021	China League One	0	0	0	0	–		0	0	0	0
Career total			75	6	3	0	0	0	2	0	80	6

== Honours ==
Shaanxi Chang'an Union

- CMCL play-offs: 2023
