= Wen Wubin =

Chinese association football player

Personal information
- Date of birth: 7 January 1997 (age 29)
- Place of birth: Xiangyang, Hubei, China
- Height: 1.86 m (6 ft 1 in)
- Position: Midfielder

Team information
- Current team: Shaanxi Union

Youth career
- –2018: Beijing Guoan
- 2019–2020: Sichuan Longfor

Senior career*
Years	Team	Apps	(Gls)
2020–2022	Shaanxi Chang'an Athletic	26	(1)
2023	Nanjing City	4	(0)
2023-	Shaanxi Union	30	(0)
2025	→ Wuxi Wugou (loan)	3	(0)
- * Club domestic league appearances and goals as of 14:01, 27 July 2021 (UTC)

Wen Wubin (Chinese: 文武斌; born 7 January 1997) is a Chinese footballer currently playing as a midfielder for Shaanxi Union.

== Career statistics ==
=== Club ===
As of 27 July 2021.

Club	Season	League			Cup		Continental		Other		Total	
Club	Season	Division	Apps	Goals	Apps	Goals	Apps	Goals	Apps	Goals	Apps	Goals
Shaanxi Chang'an Athletic	2020	China League One	15	1	0	0	–		0	0	15	1
Shaanxi Chang'an Athletic	2021	China League One	11	0	0	0	–		0	0	11	0
Career total			26	1	0	0	0	0	0	0	26	1

== Honours ==
Shaanxi Chang'an Union

- CMCL play-offs: 2023
