= Weinan Sports Center Stadium =

Sports venue in Weinan, China

- 渭南市体育中心体育场
- Interactive map of Weinan Sports Center Stadium
- Location: Weinan, Shaanxi, China
- Coordinates: 34°31′13″N 109°27′17″E
- Capacity: 32,000

Construction
- Opened: 2014

Tenants
- Shaanxi Chang'an Athletic (2017–2021); Shaanxi Union (2023, 2024)

The Weinan Sports Center Stadium is a stadium located in Weinan, Shaanxi, China, part of the greater Weinan Sports Center complex. It was completed and opened to the public in 2014. It is currently used mostly for football matches. It was most recently the home of Shaanxi Chang'an Union, in 2023. It had also been the home of Shaanxi Chang'an Athletic.

The complex has a total area of 463 acres. It includes the stadium, a comprehensive training hall, a swimming pool, a shooting hall, teaching office buildings, student apartments, canteens, outdoor track and field fields, and swimming pools. The center has a total investment of 1.027 billion Yuan and a construction area of about 124,000 square meters.

The Weinan Sports Center is the first prefecture-level urban sports center in Northwest China.
