= Sun Bin (footballer) =

Chinese footballer

Sun Bin 孙彬
Personal information
- Full name: Sun Bin
- Date of birth: April 25, 1984 (age 42)
- Place of birth: Qingdao, China
- Height: 1.78 m (5 ft 10 in)
- Position: Defender

Youth career
- 1999–2006: Shandong Luneng

Senior career*
Years	Team	Apps	(Gls)
2006–2009	Qingdao Jonoon	11	(0)
- * Club domestic league appearances and goals

Sun Bin (Chinese: 孙彬) (born 25 April 1984 in Qingdao) is a Chinese football player.

== Club career ==
=== Shandong Luneng ===
A product of the Shandong Luneng youth system Sun Bin would graduate through their various youth teams, however he was never able to make any senior level appearance for Shandong Luneng and despite several seasons with Shandong he was allowed to leave.

=== Qingdao Jonoon ===
He transferred to top tier club Qingdao Jonoon at the beginning of the 2006 Chinese league season with Cha Kejun, Zhou Yi and An Shuai. Within the campaign Sun would soon make his debut for the club on March 25, 2006 in a league game against Shanghai Shenhua, which Qingdao lost 2–1.
