= Yang Xudong =

Chinese association football player

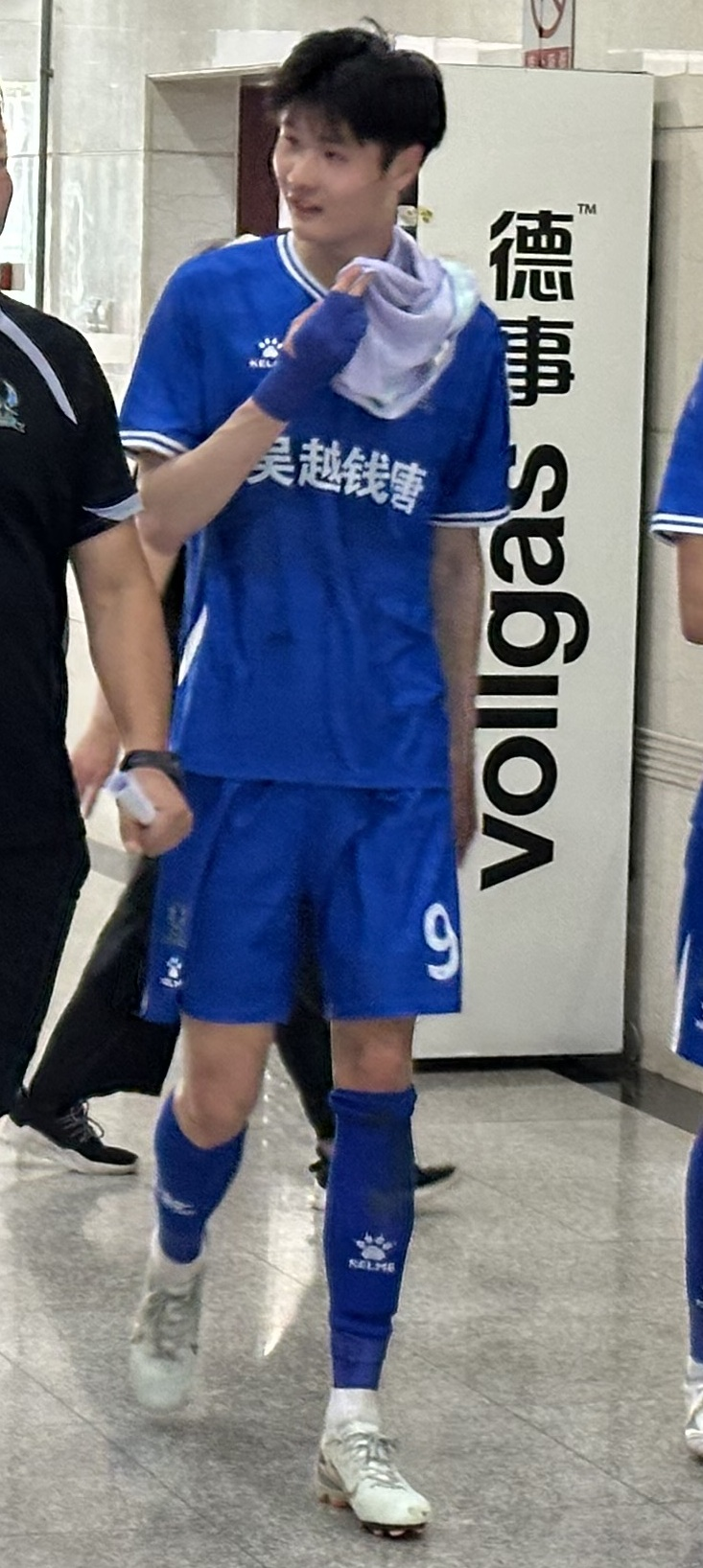
- Yang Xudong in June 2025

Personal information
- Date of birth: 16 October 2001 (age 25)
- Place of birth: Yucheng, Shandong, China
- Height: 1.90 m (6 ft 3 in)
- Position: Striker

Team information
- Current team: Hangzhou Linping Wuyue
- Number: 9

Senior career*
Years	Team	Apps	(Gls)
2021–2022	Beijing SU	26	(0)
2023–	Hangzhou Linping Wuyue	40	(11)
- * Club domestic league appearances and goals as of 22 June 2025

Yang Xudong (Chinese: 杨旭东; born 16 October 2001) is a Chinese footballer who plays as a striker for China League Two club Hangzhou Linping Wuyue.

== Career statistics ==
=== Club ===
As of 24 August 2021.

Club	Season	League			Cup		Other		Total	
Club	Season	Division	Apps	Goals	Apps	Goals	Apps	Goals	Apps	Goals
Beijing BSU	2021	China League One	1	0	0	0	0	0	1	0
Career total			1	0	0	0	0	0	1	0
