= Mi Haolun =

Chinese footballer (born 1993)

Mi Haolun 糜昊伦
Personal information
- Date of birth: 10 January 1993 (age 33)
- Place of birth: Xi'an, Shaanxi, China
- Height: 1.75 m (5 ft 9 in)
- Position: Left-back

Team information
- Current team: Shaanxi Union
- Number: 29

Youth career
- 2006–2011: Shandong Luneng

Senior career*
Years	Team	Apps	(Gls)
2011	Shandong Youth	15	(6)
2012–2015	Shandong Luneng	1	(0)
2015	→ Shijiazhuang Ever Bright (loan)	23	(0)
2016	Shijiazhuang Ever Bright	25	(0)
2017–2019	Tianjin Quanjian	60	(0)
2020–2023	Shenzhen FC	59	(1)
2023–	Shaanxi Union	48	(7)

International career
2007–2008	China U-16		
2010–2011	China U-19		
2015–2016	China U-23		
- * Club domestic league appearances and goals as of 31 December 2025

Mi Haolun (Chinese: 糜昊伦; Xiao'erjing: ٔمِ ﻫَﻮْ لٌ; born 10 January 1993) is a Chinese professional footballer who plays as a left-back for China League One club Shaanxi Union.

== Club career ==
After playing in the youth squad of Shandong Luneng Taishan, Mi started his football career in 2011. He played for Shandong Youth in the China League Two and scored 6 goals in the 15 appearances in the season. On 21 May 2011, he scored his first league goal in a 2–0 home victory against Hebei Zhongji. He was promoted to Shandong Luneng's first team squad by Henk ten Cate in June 2012. He eventually made his Super League debut on 12 April 2014 against Hangzhou Greentown in a 2–0 victory.

In February 2015, Mi was loaned to Chinese Super League side Shijiazhuang Ever Bright for the 2015 league season. He made his debut for Shijiazhuang on 1 May 2015 in a 3–1 away defeat against Beijing Guoan. He became a regular starter after the match, making 23 appearances in the league as Shijiazhuang finished 7th place in the 2015 season. He made a permanent transfer to Shijiazhuang Ever Bright in January 2016.

In January 2017, Mi moved to fellow Super League side Tianjin Quanjian. He made his debut for Tianjin on 4 March 2017 in a 2–0 away loss against Guangzhou R&F. He would establish himself as a vital member of the team and aided them to their highest ever position of third and qualification to the AFC Champions League for the first time in their history. In July 2020, Mi was one of eight former Tianjin Tianhai players to sign with Shenzhen FC. He would make his debut in a league game on 4 August 2020 against Guangzhou Evergrande Taobao F.C. in a 3-1 defeat.

== Career statistics ==
Statistics accurate as of match played 31 December 2025.

Appearances and goals by club, season and competition
Club	Season	League			National Cup		Continental		Other		Total	
Club	Season	Division	Apps	Goals	Apps	Goals	Apps	Goals	Apps	Goals	Apps	Goals
Shandong Youth	2011	China League Two	15	6	-		-		-		15	6
Shandong Luneng Taishan	2012	Chinese Super League	0	0	0	0	-		-		0	0
Shandong Luneng Taishan	2013	Chinese Super League	0	0	0	0	-		-		0	0
Shandong Luneng Taishan	2014	Chinese Super League	1	0	0	0	0	0	-		1	0
Shandong Luneng Taishan	Total		1	0	0	0	0	0	0	0	1	0
Shijiazhuang Ever Bright (loan)	2015	Chinese Super League	23	0	1	0	-		-		24	0
Shijiazhuang Ever Bright	2016	Chinese Super League	25	0	0	0	-		-		25	0
Tianjin Quanjian	2017	Chinese Super League	25	0	4	0	-		-		29	0
Tianjin Quanjian	2018	Chinese Super League	19	0	2	1	10	0	-		31	1
Tianjin Quanjian	2019	Chinese Super League	16	0	1	0	-		-		17	0
Tianjin Quanjian	Total		60	0	7	1	10	0	0	0	77	1
Shenzhen	2020	Chinese Super League	13	0	1	0	-		-		14	0
Shenzhen	2021	Chinese Super League	17	0	4	0	-		-		21	0
Shenzhen	2022	Chinese Super League	19	1	0	0	-		-		19	1
Shenzhen	2023	Chinese Super League	10	0	0	0	-		-		10	0
Shenzhen	Total		59	1	5	0	0	0	0	0	64	1
Shaanxi Union	2023	CMCL	8	2	-		-		-		14	0
Shaanxi Union	2024	China League Two	26	4	2	0	-		-		28	4
Shaanxi Union	2025	China League One	14	1	1	0	-		-		15	1
Shaanxi Union	Total		48	7	3	0	0	0	0	0	51	7
Career total			231	14	16	1	10	0	0	0	257	15

== Honours ==
Shaanxi Chang'an Union

- CMCL play-offs: 2023
