= Wu Linfeng =

Chinese association football player

Personal information
- Date of birth: 16 July 1999 (age 27)
- Height: 1.75 m (5 ft 9 in)
- Position: Forward

Team information
- Current team: Shanxi Chongde Ronghai

Youth career
- –2019: Hebei Zhuoao
- 2018: → Botafogo-SP (youth loan)

Senior career*
Years	Team	Apps	(Gls)
2019–2020	Hebei Zhuoao	25	(2)
2020	→ Suzhou Dongwu (loan)	10	(0)
2021–2022	Liaoning Shenyang Urban	4	(0)
2022–2023	Guangxi Pingguo Haliao	21	(4)
2023	Shijiazhuang Gongfu	7	(0)
2023–2024	Changchun Shenhua	0	(0)
2024–2025	Jiangxi Lushan	10	(0)
2025–2026	Wuxi Wugo	11	(0)
2026–	Shanxi Chongde Ronghai	0	(0)
- * Club domestic league appearances and goals as of 20:08, 11 March 2026 (UTC)

Wu Linfeng (Chinese: 巫林峰; born 16 July 1999) is a Chinese footballer currently playing as a forward for China League Two club Shanxi Chongde Ronghai.

== Career statistics ==
=== Club ===
As of 28 July 2021.

Club	Season	League			Cup		Continental		Other		Total	
Club	Season	Division	Apps	Goals	Apps	Goals	Apps	Goals	Apps	Goals	Apps	Goals
Hebei Zhuoao	2019	China League Two	25	2	4 (Note: Appearances in the Chinese FA Cup)	3	–		7 (Note: Appearances in the China League Two playoffs)	2	36	7
Hebei Zhuoao	2020	China League Two	0	0	0	0	–		0	0	0	0
Hebei Zhuoao	Total		25	2	4	3	0	0	7	2	36	7
Suzhou Dongwu (loan)	2020	China League One	10	0	0	0	–		0	0	10	0
Liaoning Shenyang Urban	2021	China League One	4	0	0	0	–		0	0	4	0
Career total			39	2	4	3	0	0	7	2	50	7
