= 2023 Chinese Champions League =

Football league season

Chinese Champions League
- Season: 2023
- Dates: 29 April – 3 November 2023
- Champions: Langfang Glory City
- Promoted: Langfang Glory City; Shenzhen Juniors; Shaanxi Chang'an Union; Guangxi Hengchen; Guangzhou E-Power; Rizhao Yuqi; Dalian Huayi; Xi'an Chongde Ronghai
- Top goalscorer: (China) Liang Xueming (12 goals)
- Biggest home win: Guangzhou E-Power 12–0 Kaifeng Songyun (14 October 2023)
- Biggest away win: Changle Jingangtui 0–10 Binzhou Huilong (24 September 2023)
- Highest scoring: Qiandongnan Miaoling 1–11 Shanghai Tongji (Note: Played on neutral grounds, therefore not counting towards biggest home and away wins.) (18 May 2023); Guangzhou E-Power 12–0 Kaifeng Songyun (14 October 2023)
- Longest winning run: 9 matches Langfang Glory City
- Longest unbeaten run: 14 matches Langfang Glory City; Shenzhen Juniors (Note: Shenzhen Juniors only lost on penalties in the final, which does not count towards the unbeaten record.)
- Longest winless run: 7 matches Kaifeng Songyun
- Longest losing run: 7 matches Kaifeng Songyun
- Highest attendance: 26,156; Binzhou Huilong 0–1 Guangzhou E-Power (17 September 2023)
- Lowest attendance: 10; Zhuhai 2030 2–1 Yiwu Jinxiu (11 June 2023)

The 2023 Chinese Champions League, officially known as the Sino-LAC Sports 2023 Chinese Football Association Member Association Champions League (Chinese: 中拉体育2023中国足球协会会员协会冠军联赛) for sponsorship reasons, was the 22nd season since its establishment in 2002.

The season started on 29 April 2023.

== Qualified teams ==
=== Club changes ===
64 teams will participate in the regional competitions. Macau club Chao Pak Kei will participate in the competition as a guest team.

==== To CMCL ====
Teams relegated from 2022 China League Two

- Inner Mongolia Caoshangfei

==== From CMCL ====
Teams promoted to 2023 China League Two

- Yuxi Yukun
- Chongqing Tongliangloong
- Guangxi Lanhang
- Dalian Duxing

==== Name changes ====
- Binzhou Huilong F.C. changed their name to Shaanxi Chang'an Union in May 2023, but will play under their original name for the 2023 season.

=== Clubs information ===
Football association	Qualificated competition	Season	Position	Team	City	Head Coach
Changchun FA	Chinese Champions League	2022	8th	Changchun Shenhua	Changchun	
Changchun FA	Changchun Football League	2022	1st	Changchun Xidu	Changchun	
Chinese Enterprise Sports Association		2022	1st	Beijing Smart Sky	Beijing	
Chinese Enterprise Sports Association		2022	1st	Changzhi Huicheng	Changzhi	
Chinese Enterprise Sports Association		2022	1st	Yiwu Jinxiu	Yiwu	
Chongqing FA	Chongqing Super League	2022	2nd	Chongqing Huanshengtai	Chongqing	
Chongqing FA	Chongqing Super League	2022	4th	Chongqing Benbiao	Chongqing	
Chongqing FA	Chongqing Super League	2022	5th	Chongqing Rich	Chongqing	
Dalian FA	Dalian Football League	2022	3rd	Dalian Huayi	Dalian	
Fujian FA	Fujian Football League	2022	1st	Quanzhou Qinggong	Quanzhou	
Fujian FA	Fujian Football League	2022	4th	Changle Jingangtui	Fuzhou	
Gansu FA	Chinese Champions League	2022	14th	Jingchuan Wenhui	Jingchuan	
Gansu FA		2022	1st	Gansu Mass Ray	Lanzhou	
Guangdong FA	Guangdong Super League	2022	3rd	Guangdong Red Treasure	Guangzhou	
Guangdong FA	Guangdong Super League	2022	4th	Zhuhai 2030	Zhuhai	
Guangdong FA	Guangzhou Football League	2022	3rd	Guangzhou E-Power	Guangzhou	
Guangxi FA	Guangxi Super League	2022	1st	Guangxi Hengchen	Nanning	
Guangxi FA	Guangxi Super League	2022	2nd	Guangxi Junling Feisu	Hezhou	
Guangxi FA	Guangxi Super League	2023	1st	Guangxi Yong City	Nanning	
Guangxi FA	Guangxi Super League	2023	2nd	Liuzhou Ranko	Liuzhou	
Guangxi FA	Guangxi Super League	2023	3rd	Guangxi Bushan	Guigang	
Guizhou FA	Guizhou Champions League	2023	2nd	Qianxinan Prefecture Xufengtang	Xingyi	
Guizhou FA	Guizhou Champions League	2023	3rd	Qiandongnan Miaoling	Kaili	
Hebei FA	Hebei Football League	2022	1st	Langfang Glory City	Langfang	
Hebei FA	Hebei Football League	2022	2nd	Shijiazhuang Kicker	Shijiazhuang	
Hebei FA	Hebei Football League	2022	4th	Baoding Xuecheng Athletic	Baoding	
Henan FA	Henan Champions League	2023	3rd	Henan Orient Classic	Zhengzhou	
Henan FA	Henan Champions League	2023	4th	Kaifeng Songyun	Kaifeng	
Inner Mongolia FA	China League Two	2022	18th	Inner Mongolia Caoshangfei ^{R}	Baotou	
Jiangsu FA	Jiangsu Champions League	2022	3rd	Kunshan Dianshanhu	Kunshan	
Jiangxi FA	Jiangxi Super League	2022	3rd	Yichun Wiser	Yichun	
Kunming FA	Recommendation			The Alliance of Guardians	Kunming	
Liaoning FA	Recommendation			Yingkou Chaoyue	Yingkou	
Macau Football Association	Liga de Elite	2022	1st	(Macau) Chao Pak Kei	Macau	
Nanjing FA	Nanjing Super League	2022	2nd	Nanjing Tehu	Nanjing	
Nanjing FA	Nanjing Super League	2022	5th	Jiangsu Landhouse Dong Victory	Nanjing	
Ningxia FA	Ningxia Super League	2022	2nd	Ningxia Fangzhong	Yinchuan	
Qingdao FA	Qingdao Super League	2022	2nd	Qingdao Quickboy	Qingdao	
Qingdao FA	Qingdao Super League	2023	2nd	Qingdao May Wind	Qingdao	
Shaanxi FA	Recommendation			Binzhou Huilong	Binzhou	
Shandong FA	Chinese Champions League	2022	15th	Rizhao Yuqi	Rizhao	
Shandong FA	Shandong Super League	2022	1st	Shandong Yuandong	Jinan	
Shandong FA	Shandong Super League	2022	2nd	Shandong Scout	Linyi	
Shanghai FA	Shanghai Super League	2022	1st	Shanghai Second	Shanghai	
Shanghai FA	Shanghai Super League	2022	2nd	Shanghai Mitsubishi Heavy Industries Flying Lion	Shanghai	
Shanghai FA	Shanghai Super League	2022	3rd	Shanghai Luckystar	Shanghai	
Shanghai FA	Shanghai Super League	2022	6th	Shanghai Tongji	Shanghai	
Shanxi FA	Shanxi Super League	2022	1st	Shanxi Longchengren	Taiyuan	
Shanxi FA	Shanxi Super League	2022	3rd	Datong Lions	Datong	
Shenzhen FA	Shenzhen Super League	2022	1st	Shenzhen Juniors	Shenzhen	
Shenzhen FA	Shenzhen Super League	2022	5th	Shenzhen Boss United	Shenzhen	
Sichuan FA	Recommendation			Chengdu Yuhui Rende	Chengdu	
Tianjin FA	Chinese Champions league	2022	6th	Tianjin Jinchengren	Tianjin	
Wuhan FA	Wuhan Football League	2022	1st	Wuhan Xiaoma	Wuhan	
Xi'an FA	Xi'an Football League	2023	1st	Xi'an Chongde Ronghai	Xi'an	
Xi'an FA	Xi'an Football League	2023	2nd	Xi'an Hi-Tech Yilian	Xi'an	
Xi'an FA	Xi'an Football League	2023	3rd	Shaanxi Shaanan	Xi'an	
Xiamen FA	Xiamen Super League	2022	1st	Xiamen 1026	Xiamen	
Xiamen FA	Xiamen Super League	2022	2nd	Xiamen Lujian Tiancheng	Xiamen	
Xinjiang FA	Xinjiang Football League	2023	1st	Xinjiang Lingmengzhe	Ürümqi	
Xinjiang FA	Xinjiang Football League	2023	2nd	Ili Jiucheng	Yining	
Xinjiang FA	Xinjiang Football League	2023	4th	Yutian Wanfang	Yutian	
Yunnan FA	Yunnan Football League	2022	4th	Yunnan Jin Dal Lae	Kunming	
Yunnan FA	Yunnan Football League	2022	9th	Qujing EB	Qujing	

== Regional competitions ==
The following nine cities will host regional competitions: Baotou, Changzhi, Datong, Duyun, Foshan, Guangzhou, Kunming, Nanjing, and Rizhao. The draw for the regional competitions was held on 19 April 2023.

=== Group A ===
Pos	Team	Pld	W	D	L	GF	GA	GD	Pts	Qualification
1	Rizhao Yuqi	3	3	0	0	8	1	+7	9	Qualification for Qualifying round
2	Xi'an Hi-Tech Yilian	3	2	0	1	3	2	+1	6	Qualification for Qualifying round
3	Gansu Mass Ray	3	0	1	2	1	3	−2	1	Qualification for Third-placed playoffs
4	Shijiazhuang Kicker	3	0	1	2	0	6	−6	1	Qualification for Fourth-placed playoffs

Rules for classification: 1) Points; 2) Head-to-head points; 3) Head-to-head goal difference; 4) Head-to-head goals scored; 5) Goal difference; 6) Goals scored; 7) Disciplinary points (yellow card = 1 point, red card as a result of two yellow cards = 3 points, direct red card = 3 points, yellow card followed by direct red card = 4 points); 8) Drawing of lots.

29 April 2023	Rizhao Yuqi	2–1	Gansu Mass Ray	Rizhao International Football Center, Rizhao
13:30 UTC+8				Referee: Han Lei

29 April 2023	Xi'an Hi-Tech Yilian	2–0	Shijiazhuang Kicker	Rizhao International Football Center Training Base Field No.1, Rizhao
13:30 UTC+8				Referee: Pei Xiaodong

1 May 2023	Gansu Mass Ray	0–1	Xi'an Hi-Tech Yilian	Rizhao International Football Center, Rizhao
16:30 UTC+8				Referee: Zhang Yi

1 May 2023	Shijiazhuang Kicker	0–4	Rizhao Yuqi	Rizhao International Football Center Training Base Field No.1, Rizhao
16:30 UTC+8				Referee: Zhao Ming

3 May 2023	Rizhao Yuqi	2–0	Xi'an Hi-Tech Yilian	Rizhao International Football Center, Rizhao
16:30 UTC+8				Referee: Xiao Nan

3 May 2023	Shijiazhuang Kicker	0–0	Gansu Mass Ray	Rizhao International Football Center Training Base Field No.1, Rizhao
15:30 UTC+8				Referee: Zhou Peiheng

=== Group B ===
Pos	Team	Pld	W	D	L	GF	GA	GD	Pts	Qualification
1	Binzhou Huilong	3	3	0	0	8	0	+8	9	Qualification for Qualifying round
2	Yingkou Chaoyue	3	1	1	1	3	4	−1	4	Qualification for Qualifying round
3	Shandong Scout	3	0	2	1	2	4	−2	2	Qualification for Third-placed playoffs
4	Jingchuan Wenhui	3	0	1	2	1	6	−5	1	Qualification for Fourth-placed playoffs

Rules for classification: 1) Points; 2) Head-to-head points; 3) Head-to-head goal difference; 4) Head-to-head goals scored; 5) Goal difference; 6) Goals scored; 7) Disciplinary points (yellow card = 1 point, red card as a result of two yellow cards = 3 points, direct red card = 3 points, yellow card followed by direct red card = 4 points); 8) Drawing of lots.

29 April 2023	Jingchuan Wenhui	0–2	Yingkou Chaoyue	Rizhao International Football Center, Rizhao
16:30 UTC+8				Referee: Qin Xiaohan

29 April 2023	Binzhou Huilong	2–0	Shandong Scout	Rizhao International Football Center Training Base Field No.1, Rizhao
16:30 UTC+8				Referee: Liu Hang

1 May 2023	Yingkou Chaoyue	0–3	Binzhou Huilong	Rizhao International Football Center, Rizhao
13:30 UTC+8				Referee: Guo Zhen

1 May 2023	Shandong Scout	1–1	Jingchuan Wenhui	Rizhao International Football Center Training Base Field No.1, Rizhao
13:30 UTC+8				Referee: Yang Song

3 May 2023	Jingchuan Wenhui	0–3	Binzhou Huilong	Rizhao International Football Center, Rizhao
13:30 UTC+8				Referee: Liu Hang

3 May 2023	Shandong Scout	1–1	Yingkou Chaoyue	Rizhao International Football Center Training Base Field No.1, Rizhao
13:30 UTC+8				Referee: Chen Sheng

=== Group C ===
Pos	Team	Pld	W	D	L	GF	GA	GD	Pts	Qualification
1	Datong Lions	3	2	1	0	5	2	+3	7	Qualification for Qualifying round
2	Wuhan Xiaoma	3	1	2	0	4	3	+1	5	Qualification for Qualifying round
3	Changchun Xidu	3	1	0	2	3	4	−1	3	Qualification for Third-placed playoffs
4	Yutian Wanfang	3	0	1	2	1	4	−3	1	Qualification for Fourth-placed playoffs

Rules for classification: 1) Points; 2) Head-to-head points; 3) Head-to-head goal difference; 4) Head-to-head goals scored; 5) Goal difference; 6) Goals scored; 7) Disciplinary points (yellow card = 1 point, red card as a result of two yellow cards = 3 points, direct red card = 3 points, yellow card followed by direct red card = 4 points); 8) Drawing of lots.

19 June 2023	Datong Lions	2–1	Changchun Xidu	Huizhi Innovation City Stadium, Datong
14:00 UTC+8				Referee: Yang Chunyu

19 June 2023	Yutian Wanfang	1–1	Wuhan Xiaoma	Huizhi Innovation City Stadium, Datong
17:00 UTC+8				Referee: Zhang Yi

21 June 2023	Changchun Xidu	1–0	Yutian Wanfang	Huizhi Innovation City Stadium, Datong
14:00 UTC+8				Referee: Huang Xiang

21 June 2023	Wuhan Xiaoma	1–1	Datong Lions	Huizhi Innovation City Stadium, Datong
17:00 UTC+8				Referee: Zheng Shenfei

23 June 2023	Datong Lions	2–0	Yutian Wanfang	Huizhi Innovation City Stadium, Datong
14:00 UTC+8				Referee: Geng Maoxiang

23 June 2023	Wuhan Xiaoma	2–1	Changchun Xidu	Datong Sports School Stadium, Datong
14:00 UTC+8				Referee: Yang Chunyu

=== Group D ===
Pos	Team	Pld	W	D	L	GF	GA	GD	Pts	Qualification
1	Changchun Shenhua	3	3	0	0	6	1	+5	9	Qualification for Qualifying round
2	Shanxi Longchengren	3	1	1	1	6	6	0	4	Qualification for Qualifying round
3	Shandong Yuandong	3	1	0	2	5	8	−3	3	Qualification for Third-placed playoffs
4	Xinjiang Lingmengzhe	3	0	1	2	2	4	−2	1	Qualification for Fourth-placed playoffs

Rules for classification: 1) Points; 2) Head-to-head points; 3) Head-to-head goal difference; 4) Head-to-head goals scored; 5) Goal difference; 6) Goals scored; 7) Disciplinary points (yellow card = 1 point, red card as a result of two yellow cards = 3 points, direct red card = 3 points, yellow card followed by direct red card = 4 points); 8) Drawing of lots.

19 June 2023	Changchun Shenhua	1–0	Xinjiang Lingmengzhe	Datong Sports School Stadium, Datong
14:00 UTC+8				Referee: Huang Xiang

19 June 2023	Shanxi Longchengren	4–3	Shandong Yuandong	Datong Sports School Stadium, Datong
17:00 UTC+8				Referee: Geng Maoxiang

21 June 2023	Xinjiang Lingmengzhe	1–1	Shanxi Longchengren	Datong Sports School Stadium, Datong
14:00 UTC+8				Referee: Zhang Yi

21 June 2023	Shandong Yuandong	0–3	Changchun Shenhua	Datong Sports School Stadium, Datong
17:00 UTC+8				Referee: Yan Cheng

23 June 2023	Changchun Shenhua	2–1	Shanxi Longchengren	Datong Sports School Stadium, Datong
17:00 UTC+8				Referee: Huang Xiang

23 June 2023	Shandong Yuandong	2–1	Xinjiang Lingmengzhe	Huizhi Innovation City Stadium, Datong
17:00 UTC+8				Referee: Zheng Shenfei

=== Group E ===
Pos	Team	Pld	W	D	L	GF	GA	GD	Pts	Qualification
1	Langfang Glory City	3	3	0	0	7	1	+6	9	Qualification for Qualifying round
2	Shaanxi Shaanan	3	1	1	1	7	7	0	4	Qualification for Qualifying round
3	Qingdao May Wind	3	1	1	1	3	3	0	4	Qualification for Third-placed playoffs
4	Changzhi Huicheng	3	0	0	3	3	9	−6	0	Qualification for Fourth-placed playoffs

Rules for classification: 1) Points; 2) Head-to-head points; 3) Head-to-head goal difference; 4) Head-to-head goals scored; 5) Goal difference; 6) Goals scored; 7) Disciplinary points (yellow card = 1 point, red card as a result of two yellow cards = 3 points, direct red card = 3 points, yellow card followed by direct red card = 4 points); 8) Drawing of lots.

3 July 2023	Changzhi Huicheng	0–1	Qingdao May Wind	Changzhi Sports Center Stadium, Changzhi
14:00 UTC+8				Referee: Guo Xiangyu

3 July 2023	Shaanxi Shaanan	0–3	Langfang Glory City	Changzhi Sports Center Stadium, Changzhi
17:00 UTC+8				Referee: Liu Shuang

5 July 2023	Qingdao May Wind	2–2	Shaanxi Shaanan	Changzhi Sports Center Stadium, Changzhi
14:00 UTC+8				Referee: Ji Yunhao

5 July 2023	Langfang Glory City	3–1	Changzhi Huicheng	Changzhi Sports Center Stadium, Changzhi
17:00 UTC+8				Referee: Chen Sheng

7 July 2023	Changzhi Huicheng	2–5	Shaanxi Shaanan	Changzhi Sports Center Stadium, Changzhi
14:00 UTC+8				Referee: Sun Yan

7 July 2023	Langfang Glory City	1–0	Qingdao May Wind	Tunliu Sports Center Football Field No.1, Changzhi
14:00 UTC+8				Referee: Wang Ke

=== Group F ===
Pos	Team	Pld	W	D	L	GF	GA	GD	Pts	Qualification
1	Xi'an Chongde Ronghai	3	2	1	0	10	1	+9	7	Qualification for Qualifying round
2	Qingdao Quickboy	3	1	2	0	7	1	+6	5	Qualification for Qualifying round
3	Beijing Smart Sky	3	1	1	1	4	6	−2	4	Qualification for Third-placed playoffs
4	Baoding Xuecheng Athletic	3	0	0	3	1	14	−13	0	Qualification for Fourth-placed playoffs

Rules for classification: 1) Points; 2) Head-to-head points; 3) Head-to-head goal difference; 4) Head-to-head goals scored; 5) Goal difference; 6) Goals scored; 7) Disciplinary points (yellow card = 1 point, red card as a result of two yellow cards = 3 points, direct red card = 3 points, yellow card followed by direct red card = 4 points); 8) Drawing of lots.

3 July 2023	Xi'an Chongde Ronghai	0–0	Qingdao Quickboy	Tunliu Sports Center Football Field No.1, Changzhi
14:00 UTC+8				Referee: Zhang Yi

3 July 2023	Beijing Smart Sky	2–1	Baoding Xuecheng Athletic	Tunliu Sports Center Football Field No.1, Changzhi
16:45 UTC+8				Referee: Pei Xiaodong

5 July 2023	Qingdao Quickboy	1–1	Beijing Smart Sky	Tunliu Sports Center Football Field No.1, Changzhi
14:00 UTC+8				Referee: Zhou Peiheng

5 July 2023	Baoding Xuecheng Athletic	0–6	Xi'an Chongde Ronghai	Tunliu Sports Center Football Field No.1, Changzhi
17:00 UTC+8				Referee: Ji Chenguang

7 July 2023	Xi'an Chongde Ronghai	4–1	Beijing Smart Sky	Tunliu Sports Center Football Field No.1, Changzhi
17:00 UTC+8				Referee: Liu Shuang

7 July 2023	Baoding Xuecheng Athletic	0–6	Qingdao Quickboy	Changzhi Sports Center Stadium, Changzhi
17:00 UTC+8				Referee: Guo Xiangyu

=== Group G ===
Pos	Team	Pld	W	D	L	GF	GA	GD	Pts	Qualification
1	Henan Orient Classic	3	3	0	0	6	2	+4	9	Qualification for Qualifying round
2	Ili Jiucheng	3	2	0	1	7	3	+4	6	Qualification for Qualifying round
3	Kunshan Dianshanhu	3	1	0	2	4	8	−4	3	Qualification for Third-placed playoffs
4	Inner Mongolia Caoshangfei	3	0	0	3	0	4	−4	0	Qualification for Fourth-placed playoffs

Rules for classification: 1) Points; 2) Head-to-head points; 3) Head-to-head goal difference; 4) Head-to-head goals scored; 5) Goal difference; 6) Goals scored; 7) Disciplinary points (yellow card = 1 point, red card as a result of two yellow cards = 3 points, direct red card = 3 points, yellow card followed by direct red card = 4 points); 8) Drawing of lots.

16 July 2023	Inner Mongolia Caoshangfei	0–2	Ili Jiucheng	Baotou Olympic Sports Centre Stadium, Baotou
14:00 UTC+8				Referee: Liu Chentao

16 July 2023	Henan Orient Classic	3–2	Kunshan Dianshanhu	Baotou Rare-Earth Hi-tech Zone Football Park Stadium, Baotou
14:00 UTC+8				Referee: Wang Yang

18 July 2023	Ili Jiucheng	0–2	Henan Orient Classic	Baotou Olympic Sports Centre Stadium, Baotou
17:00 UTC+8				Referee: Zhang Qi

18 July 2023	Kunshan Dianshanhu	1–0	Inner Mongolia Caoshangfei	Baotou Rare-Earth Hi-tech Zone Football Park Stadium, Baotou
17:00 UTC+8				Referee: Zhang Long

20 July 2023	Inner Mongolia Caoshangfei	0–1	Henan Orient Classic	Baotou Olympic Sports Centre Stadium, Baotou
14:00 UTC+8				Referee: Ren Dexin

20 July 2023	Kunshan Dianshanhu	1–5	Ili Jiucheng	Baotou Rare-Earth Hi-tech Zone Football Park Stadium, Baotou
14:00 UTC+8				Referee: Wang Yang

=== Group H ===
Pos	Team	Pld	W	D	L	GF	GA	GD	Pts	Qualification
1	Dalian Huayi	3	1	2	0	14	5	+9	5	Qualification for Qualifying round
2	Kaifeng Songyun	3	1	2	0	6	4	+2	5	Qualification for Qualifying round
3	Tianjin Jinchengren	3	1	2	0	4	2	+2	5	Qualification for Third-placed playoffs
4	Ningxia Fangzhong	3	0	0	3	1	14	−13	0	Qualification for Fourth-placed playoffs

Rules for classification: 1) Points; 2) Head-to-head points; 3) Head-to-head goal difference; 4) Head-to-head goals scored; 5) Goal difference; 6) Goals scored; 7) Disciplinary points (yellow card = 1 point, red card as a result of two yellow cards = 3 points, direct red card = 3 points, yellow card followed by direct red card = 4 points); 8) Drawing of lots.

16 July 2023	Tianjin Jinchengren	1–1	Dalian Huayi	Baotou Olympic Sports Centre Stadium, Baotou
17:00 UTC+8				Referee: Geng Maoxiang

16 July 2023	Ningxia Fangzhong	0–2	Kaifeng Songyun	Baotou Rare-Earth Hi-tech Zone Football Park Stadium, Baotou
17:00 UTC+8				Referee: Guo Zhen

18 July 2023	Dalian Huayi	9–0	Ningxia Fangzhong	Baotou Olympic Sports Centre Stadium, Baotou
14:00 UTC+8				Referee: Lin Yang

18 July 2023	Kaifeng Songyun	0–0	Tianjin Jinchengren	Baotou Rare-Earth Hi-tech Zone Football Park Stadium, Baotou
14:00 UTC+8				Referee: Han Jiageng

20 July 2023	Tianjin Jinchengren	3–1	Ningxia Fangzhong	Baotou Olympic Sports Centre Stadium, Baotou
17:00 UTC+8				Referee: Liu Chentao

20 July 2023	Kaifeng Songyun	4–4	Dalian Huayi	Baotou Rare-Earth Hi-tech Zone Football Park Stadium, Baotou
17:00 UTC+8				Referee: Lin Yang

=== Group I ===
Pos	Team	Pld	W	D	L	GF	GA	GD	Pts	Qualification
1	Guangxi Yong City	3	2	1	0	9	1	+8	7	Qualification for Qualifying round
2	Shanghai Tongji	3	1	2	0	12	2	+10	5	Qualification for Qualifying round
3	Shenzhen Boss United	3	1	1	1	5	3	+2	4	Qualification for Third-placed playoffs
4	Qiandongnan Miaoling	3	0	0	3	1	21	−20	0	Qualification for Fourth-placed playoffs

Rules for classification: 1) Points; 2) Head-to-head points; 3) Head-to-head goal difference; 4) Head-to-head goals scored; 5) Goal difference; 6) Goals scored; 7) Disciplinary points (yellow card = 1 point, red card as a result of two yellow cards = 3 points, direct red card = 3 points, yellow card followed by direct red card = 4 points); 8) Drawing of lots.

14 May 2023	Qiandongnan Miaoling	0–3	Shenzhen Boss United	Qiannan Nationwide Fitness Centre Stadium, Duyun
14:00 UTC+8				Referee: Liu Yang

14 May 2023	Shanghai Tongji	0–0	Guangxi Yong City	Duyun International Football Town Field No.1, Duyun
14:00 UTC+8				Referee: Zhao Ming

16 May 2023	Shenzhen Boss United	1–1	Shanghai Tongji	Qiannan Nationwide Fitness Centre Stadium, Duyun
17:00 UTC+8				Referee: Yan Cheng

16 May 2023	Guangxi Yong City	7–0	Qiandongnan Miaoling	Duyun International Football Town Field No.1, Duyun
16:00 UTC+8				Referee: Wu Di

18 May 2023	Qiandongnan Miaoling	1–11	Shanghai Tongji	Duyun International Football Town Field No.1, Duyun
13:00 UTC+8				Referee: Hu Tongchang

18 May 2023	Guangxi Yong City	2–1	Shenzhen Boss United	Qiannan Nationwide Fitness Centre Stadium, Duyun
13:00 UTC+8				Referee: Wang Guan

=== Group J ===
Pos	Team	Pld	W	D	L	GF	GA	GD	Pts	Qualification
1	Shenzhen Juniors	3	3	0	0	7	1	+6	9	Qualification for Qualifying round
2	Shanghai Second	3	1	1	1	3	2	+1	4	Qualification for Qualifying round
3	Qianxinan Xufengtang	3	1	0	2	3	5	−2	3	Qualification for Third-placed playoffs
4	Liuzhou Ranko	3	0	1	2	0	5	−5	1	Qualification for Fourth-placed playoffs

Rules for classification: 1) Points; 2) Head-to-head points; 3) Head-to-head goal difference; 4) Head-to-head goals scored; 5) Goal difference; 6) Goals scored; 7) Disciplinary points (yellow card = 1 point, red card as a result of two yellow cards = 3 points, direct red card = 3 points, yellow card followed by direct red card = 4 points); 8) Drawing of lots.

14 May 2023	Liuzhou Ranko	0–0	Shanghai Second	Qiannan Nationwide Fitness Centre Stadium, Duyun
17:00 UTC+8				Referee: Zheng Shenfei

14 May 2023	Shenzhen Juniors	2–1	Qianxinan Xufengtang	Duyun International Football Town Field No.1, Duyun
16:00 UTC+8				Referee: Yan Cheng

16 May 2023	Shanghai Second	0–1	Shenzhen Juniors	Qiannan Nationwide Fitness Centre Stadium, Duyun
14:00 UTC+8				Referee: Zhao Ming

16 May 2023	Qianxinan Xufengtang	1–0	Liuzhou Ranko	Duyun International Football Town Field No.1, Duyun
14:00 UTC+8				Referee: Liu Yang

18 May 2023	Liuzhou Ranko	0–4	Shenzhen Juniors	Duyun International Football Town Field No.1, Duyun
16:00 UTC+8				Referee: Liu Xun

18 May 2023	Qianxinan Xufengtang	1–3	Shanghai Second	Qiannan Nationwide Fitness Centre Stadium, Duyun
16:00 UTC+8				Referee: Zheng Shenfei

=== Group K ===
Pos	Team	Pld	W	D	L	GF	GA	GD	Pts	Qualification
1	Guangzhou E-Power	3	3	0	0	15	0	+15	9	Qualification for Qualifying round
2	Xiamen 1026	3	2	0	1	7	7	0	6	Qualification for Qualifying round
3	Chongqing Benbiao	3	1	0	2	4	6	−2	3	Qualification for Third-placed playoffs
4	Chengdu Yuhui Rende	3	0	0	3	3	16	−13	0	Qualification for Fourth-placed playoffs

Rules for classification: 1) Points; 2) Head-to-head points; 3) Head-to-head goal difference; 4) Head-to-head goals scored; 5) Goal difference; 6) Goals scored; 7) Disciplinary points (yellow card = 1 point, red card as a result of two yellow cards = 3 points, direct red card = 3 points, yellow card followed by direct red card = 4 points); 8) Drawing of lots.

22 May 2023	Guangzhou E-Power	4–0	Xiamen 1026	Guangzhou Higher Education Mega Center Central Stadium, Guangzhou
16:30 UTC+8

22 May 2023	Chengdu Yuhui Rende	1–3	Chongqing Benbiao	Guangzhou Higher Education Mega Center Central Stadium, Guangzhou
19:30 UTC+8				Referee: Chen Sheng

24 May 2023	Xiamen 1026	5–2	Chengdu Yuhui Rende	Guangzhou Higher Education Mega Center Central Stadium, Guangzhou
16:30 UTC+8				Referee: Yang Song

24 May 2023	Chongqing Benbiao	0–3	Guangzhou E-Power	Guangzhou Higher Education Mega Center Central Stadium, Guangzhou
19:30 UTC+8				Referee: Han Lei

26 May 2023	Guangzhou E-Power	8–0	Chengdu Yuhui Rende	Guangzhou Higher Education Mega Center Central Stadium, Guangzhou
16:30 UTC+8				Referee: Zhang Qi

26 May 2023	Chongqing Benbiao	1–2	Xiamen 1026	Sanshui People's Stadium, Foshan
16:30 UTC+8				Referee: Chen Sheng

=== Group L ===
Pos	Team	Pld	W	D	L	GF	GA	GD	Pts	Qualification
1	Guangdong Red Treasure	3	3	0	0	7	2	+5	9	Qualification for Qualifying round
2	(Macau) Chao Pak Kei	3	2	0	1	6	4	+2	6	Qualification for Qualifying round
3	Xiamen Lujian Tiancheng	3	1	0	2	11	6	+5	3	Qualification for Third-placed playoffs
4	Guangxi Junling Feisu	3	0	0	3	3	15	−12	0	Qualification for Fourth-placed playoffs

Rules for classification: 1) Points; 2) Head-to-head points; 3) Head-to-head goal difference; 4) Head-to-head goals scored; 5) Goal difference; 6) Goals scored; 7) Disciplinary points (yellow card = 1 point, red card as a result of two yellow cards = 3 points, direct red card = 3 points, yellow card followed by direct red card = 4 points); 8) Drawing of lots.

22 May 2023	Chao Pak Kei (Macau)	3-1	Guangxi Junling Feisu	Sanshui People's Stadium, Foshan
16:30 UTC+8				Referee: Zhang Qi

22 May 2023	Xiamen Lujian Tiancheng	0–3	Guangdong Red Treasure	Sanshui People's Stadium, Foshan
19:30 UTC+8				Referee: Xiong Xing

24 May 2023	Guangxi Junling Feisu	1–10	Xiamen Lujian Tiancheng	Sanshui People's Stadium, Foshan
16:30 UTC+8				Referee: Ding Chao

24 May 2023	Guangdong Red Treasure	2–1	(Macau) Chao Pak Kei	Sanshui People's Stadium, Foshan
19:30 UTC+8				Referee: Cheng Wei

26 May 2023	Chao Pak Kei (Macau)	2–1	Xiamen Lujian Tiancheng	Sanshui People's Stadium, Foshan
19:30 UTC+8				Referee: Huang Xiang

26 May 2023	Guangdong Red Treasure	2–1	Guangxi Junling Feisu	Guangzhou Higher Education Mega Center Central Stadium, Guangzhou
19:30 UTC+8				Referee: Zhang Zhihao

=== Group M ===
Pos	Team	Pld	W	D	L	GF	GA	GD	Pts	Qualification
1	Jiangsu Landhouse Dong Victory	3	2	1	0	9	3	+6	7	Qualification for Qualifying round
2	Shanghai Luckystar	3	2	0	1	6	5	+1	6	Qualification for Qualifying round
3	Chongqing Rich	3	1	0	2	3	8	−5	3	Qualification for Third-placed playoffs
4	Guangxi Bushan	3	0	1	2	4	6	−2	1	Qualification for Fourth-placed playoffs

Rules for classification: 1) Points; 2) Head-to-head points; 3) Head-to-head goal difference; 4) Head-to-head goals scored; 5) Goal difference; 6) Goals scored; 7) Disciplinary points (yellow card = 1 point, red card as a result of two yellow cards = 3 points, direct red card = 3 points, yellow card followed by direct red card = 4 points); 8) Drawing of lots.

5 June 2023	Jiangsu Landhouse Dong Victory	4–0	Chongqing Rich	Nanjing Olympic Sports Centre Outer Field, Nanjing
14:00 UTC+8				Referee: Liu Yang

5 June 2023	Guangxi Bushan	1–2	Shanghai Luckystar	Nanjing Olympic Sports Centre Outer Field, Nanjing
17:00 UTC+8				Referee: Zhao Ming

7 June 2023	Chongqing Rich	2–1	Guangxi Bushan	Nanjing Olympic Sports Centre Outer Field, Nanjing
14:00 UTC+8				Referee: Yan Cheng

7 June 2023	Shanghai Luckystar	1–3	Jiangsu Landhouse Dong Victory	Nanjing Olympic Sports Centre Outer Field, Nanjing
17:00 UTC+8				Referee: Gu Chunhan

9 June 2023	Jiangsu Landhouse Dong Victory	2–2	Guangxi Bushan	Nanjing Olympic Sports Centre Outer Field, Nanjing
14:00 UTC+8				Referee: Xiao Nan

9 June 2023	Shanghai Luckystar	3–1	Chongqing Rich	Nanjing Youth Olympic Sports Park Stadium, Nanjing
14:00 UTC+8				Referee: Wang Guan

=== Group N ===
Pos	Team	Pld	W	D	L	GF	GA	GD	Pts	Qualification
1	Guangxi Hengchen	3	2	1	0	5	2	+3	7	Qualification for Qualifying round
2	Shanghai Mitsubishi Heavy Industries Flying Lion	3	2	0	1	9	3	+6	6	Qualification for Qualifying round
3	Nanjing Tehu	3	0	2	1	3	4	−1	2	Qualification for Third-placed playoffs
4	Chongqing Huanshengtai	3	0	1	2	1	9	−8	1	Qualification for Fourth-placed playoffs

Rules for classification: 1) Points; 2) Head-to-head points; 3) Head-to-head goal difference; 4) Head-to-head goals scored; 5) Goal difference; 6) Goals scored; 7) Disciplinary points (yellow card = 1 point, red card as a result of two yellow cards = 3 points, direct red card = 3 points, yellow card followed by direct red card = 4 points); 8) Drawing of lots.

5 June 2023	Guangxi Hengchen	1–1	Nanjing Tehu	Nanjing Youth Olympic Sports Park Stadium, Nanjing
14:00 UTC+8				Referee: Chen Sijian

5 June 2023	Shanghai Mitsubishi Heavy Industries Flying Lion	6–0	Chongqing Huanshengtai	Nanjing Youth Olympic Sports Park Stadium, Nanjing
17:00 UTC+8				Referee: Wang Guan

7 June 2023	Nanjing Tehu	1–2	Shanghai Mitsubishi Heavy Industries Flying Lion	Nanjing Youth Olympic Sports Park Stadium, Nanjing
14:00 UTC+8				Referee: Xiao Nan

7 June 2023	Chongqing Huanshengtai	0–2	Guangxi Hengchen	Nanjing Youth Olympic Sports Park Stadium, Nanjing
17:00 UTC+8				Referee: Cui Tingbin

9 June 2023	Guangxi Hengchen	2–1	Shanghai Mitsubishi Heavy Industries Flying Lion	Nanjing Olympic Sports Centre Outer Field, Nanjing
17:00 UTC+8				Referee: Cui Tingbin

9 June 2023	Chongqing Huanshengtai	1–1	Nanjing Tehu	Nanjing Youth Olympic Sports Park Stadium, Nanjing
17:00 UTC+8				Referee: Wang Haidong

=== Group O ===
Pos	Team	Pld	W	D	L	GF	GA	GD	Pts	Qualification
1	Changle Jingangtui	3	2	0	1	2	6	−4	6	Qualification for Qualifying round
2	Zhuhai 2030	3	2	0	1	4	3	+1	6	Qualification for Qualifying round
3	The Alliance of Guardians	3	1	0	2	3	4	−1	3	Qualification for Third-placed playoffs
4	Yiwu Jinxiu	3	1	0	2	8	4	+4	3	Qualification for Fourth-placed playoffs

Rules for classification: 1) Points; 2) Head-to-head points; 3) Head-to-head goal difference; 4) Head-to-head goals scored; 5) Goal difference; 6) Goals scored; 7) Disciplinary points (yellow card = 1 point, red card as a result of two yellow cards = 3 points, direct red card = 3 points, yellow card followed by direct red card = 4 points); 8) Drawing of lots.

11 June 2023	The Alliance of Guardians	0–1	Changle Jingangtui	Yunnan Kehua Football Training Base Field No.2, Kunming
14:30 UTC+8				Referee: Jiang Rui

11 June 2023	Zhuhai 2030	2–1	Yiwu Jinxiu	Yunnan Kehua Football Training Base Field No.4, Kunming
14:30 UTC+8				Referee: Hu Tengfei

13 June 2023	Changle Jingangtui	1–0	Zhuhai 2030	Yunnan Kehua Football Training Base Field No.2, Kunming
17:00 UTC+8				Referee: Zhu Di

13 June 2023	Yiwu Jinxiu	1–2	The Alliance of Guardians	Yunnan Kehua Football Training Base Field No.4, Kunming
17:00 UTC+8				Referee: Ji Yunhao

15 June 2023	The Alliance of Guardians	1–2	Zhuhai 2030	Yunnan Kehua Football Training Base Field No.4, Kunming
14:00 UTC+8				Referee: Zhu Di

15 June 2023	Yiwu Jinxiu	6–0	Changle Jingangtui	Yunnan Kehua Football Training Base Field No.2, Kunming
14:00 UTC+8				Referee: Delixiati Yimamu

=== Group P ===
Pos	Team	Pld	W	D	L	GF	GA	GD	Pts	Qualification
1	Quanzhou Qinggong	3	2	1	0	7	4	+3	7	Qualification for Qualifying round
2	Yunnan Jin Dal Lae	3	1	2	0	4	3	+1	5	Qualification for Qualifying round
3	Qujing EB	3	1	1	1	2	3	−1	4	Qualification for Third-placed playoffs
4	Yichun Wiser	3	0	0	3	2	5	−3	0	Qualification for Fourth-placed playoffs

Rules for classification: 1) Points; 2) Head-to-head points; 3) Head-to-head goal difference; 4) Head-to-head goals scored; 5) Goal difference; 6) Goals scored; 7) Disciplinary points (yellow card = 1 point, red card as a result of two yellow cards = 3 points, direct red card = 3 points, yellow card followed by direct red card = 4 points); 8) Drawing of lots.

11 June 2023	Qujing EB	1–1	Yunnan Jin Dal Lae	Yunnan Kehua Football Training Base Field No.2, Kunming
17:30 UTC+8				Referee: Zhu Di

11 June 2023	Yichun Wiser	2–3	Quanzhou Qinggong	Yunnan Kehua Football Training Base Field No.4, Kunming
17:30 UTC+8				Referee: Zheng Chao

13 June 2023	Quanzhou Qinggong	2–2	Yunnan Jin Dal Lae	Yunnan Kehua Football Training Base Field No.2, Kunming
14:00 UTC+8				Referee: Hu Tengfei

13 June 2023	Yichun Wiser	0–1	Qujing EB	Yunnan Kehua Football Training Base Field No.4, Kunming
14:00 UTC+8				Referee: Shi Yanzhong

15 June 2023	Qujing EB	0–2	Quanzhou Qinggong	Yunnan Kehua Football Training Base Field No.2, Kunming
17:00 UTC+8				Referee: Jiang Rui

15 June 2023	Yunnan Jin Dal Lae	1–0	Yichun Wiser	Yunnan Kehua Football Training Base Field No.4, Kunming
17:00 UTC+8				Referee: Hu Tengfei

== Qualifying round ==
=== Group A ===
Pos	Team	Pld	W	D	L	GF	GA	GD	Pts	Qualification
1	Binzhou Huilong	3	2	1	0	7	2	+5	7	Qualification for Final round
2	Rizhao Yuqi	3	2	1	0	6	1	+5	7	Qualification for Final round
3	Xi'an Hi-Tech Yilian	3	1	0	2	4	6	−2	3	
4	Yingkou Chaoyue	3	0	0	3	1	9	−8	0	

Rules for classification: 1) Points; 2) Head-to-head points; 3) Head-to-head goal difference; 4) Head-to-head goals scored; 5) Goal difference; 6) Goals scored; 7) Disciplinary points (yellow card = 1 point, red card as a result of two yellow cards = 3 points, direct red card = 3 points, yellow card followed by direct red card = 4 points); 8) Drawing of lots.

6 May 2023	Binzhou Huilong	3–1	Xi'an Hi-Tech Yilian	Rizhao International Football Center, Rizhao
16:30 UTC+8				Referee: Han Lei

6 May 2023	Rizhao Yuqi	3–0	Yingkou Chaoyue	Rizhao International Football Center, Rizhao
19:30 UTC+8				Referee: Guo Zhen

8 May 2023	Xi'an Hi-Tech Yilian	3–1	Yingkou Chaoyue	Rizhao International Football Center, Rizhao
16:30 UTC+8				Referee: Pei Xiaodong

8 May 2023	Binzhou Huilong	1–1	Rizhao Yuqi	Rizhao International Football Center, Rizhao
19:30 UTC+8				Referee: Chen Sheng

=== Group B ===
Pos	Team	Pld	W	D	L	GF	GA	GD	Pts	Qualification
1	Changchun Shenhua	3	3	0	0	12	2	+10	9	Qualification for Final round
2	Wuhan Xiaoma	3	1	1	1	3	8	−5	4	Qualification for Final round
3	Shanxi Longchengren	3	1	0	2	2	3	−1	3	
4	Datong Lions	3	0	1	2	1	5	−4	1	

Rules for classification: 1) Points; 2) Head-to-head points; 3) Head-to-head goal difference; 4) Head-to-head goals scored; 5) Goal difference; 6) Goals scored; 7) Disciplinary points (yellow card = 1 point, red card as a result of two yellow cards = 3 points, direct red card = 3 points, yellow card followed by direct red card = 4 points); 8) Drawing of lots.

26 June 2023	Changchun Shenhua	7–1	Wuhan Xiaoma	Datong Sports School Stadium, Datong
16:00 UTC+8				Referee: Zhang Yi

26 June 2023	Datong Lions	0–1	Shanxi Longchengren	Huizhi Innovation City Stadium, Datong
18:00 UTC+8				Referee: Huang Xiang

28 June 2023	Shanxi Longchengren	0–1	Wuhan Xiaoma	Datong Sports School Stadium, Datong
17:00 UTC+8				Referee: Geng Maoxiang

28 June 2023	Changchun Shenhua	3–0	Datong Lions	Huizhi Innovation City Stadium, Datong
17:00 UTC+8				Referee: Zheng Shenfei

=== Group C ===
Pos	Team	Pld	W	D	L	GF	GA	GD	Pts	Qualification
1	Langfang Glory City	3	3	0	0	6	0	+6	9	Qualification for Final round
2	Xi'an Chongde Ronghai	3	1	1	1	4	1	+3	4	Qualification for Final round
3	Qingdao Quickboy	3	0	2	1	2	4	−2	2	
4	Shaanxi Shaanan	3	0	1	2	2	9	−7	1	

Rules for classification: 1) Points; 2) Head-to-head points; 3) Head-to-head goal difference; 4) Head-to-head goals scored; 5) Goal difference; 6) Goals scored; 7) Disciplinary points (yellow card = 1 point, red card as a result of two yellow cards = 3 points, direct red card = 3 points, yellow card followed by direct red card = 4 points); 8) Drawing of lots.

10 July 2023	Xi'an Chongde Ronghai	4–0	Shaanxi Shaanan	Tunliu Sports Center Football Field No.1, Changzhi
15:00 UTC+8				Referee: Ji Yunhao

10 July 2023	Langfang Glory City	2–0	Qingdao Quickboy	Changzhi Sports Center Stadium, Changzhi
17:00 UTC+8				Referee: Ji Chenguang

12 July 2023	Qingdao Quickboy	2–2	Shaanxi Shaanan	Tunliu Sports Center Football Field No.1, Changzhi
16:00 UTC+8				Referee: Chen Sheng

12 July 2023	Langfang Glory City	1–0	Xi'an Chongde Ronghai	Changzhi Sports Center Stadium, Changzhi
16:00 UTC+8				Referee: Pei Xiaodong

=== Group D ===
Pos	Team	Pld	W	D	L	GF	GA	GD	Pts	Qualification
1	Dalian Huayi	3	2	1	0	16	4	+12	7	Qualification for Final round
2	Kaifeng Songyun	3	2	1	0	9	4	+5	7	Qualification for Final round
3	Henan Orient Classic	3	1	0	2	2	3	−1	3	
4	Ili Jiucheng	3	0	0	3	0	16	−16	0	

Rules for classification: 1) Points; 2) Head-to-head points; 3) Head-to-head goal difference; 4) Head-to-head goals scored; 5) Goal difference; 6) Goals scored; 7) Disciplinary points (yellow card = 1 point, red card as a result of two yellow cards = 3 points, direct red card = 3 points, yellow card followed by direct red card = 4 points); 8) Drawing of lots.

23 July 2023	Henan Orient Classic	0–1	Kaifeng Songyun	Baotou Rare-Earth Hi-tech Zone Football Park Stadium, Baotou
14:00 UTC+8				Referee: Geng Maoxiang

23 July 2023	Ili Jiucheng	0–10	Dalian Huayi	Baotou Rare-Earth Hi-tech Zone Football Park Stadium, Baotou
17:00 UTC+8				Referee: Ren Dexin

25 July 2023	Dalian Huayi	2–0	Henan Orient Classic	Baotou Olympic Sports Centre Stadium, Baotou
16:00 UTC+8				Referee: Liu Chentao

25 July 2023	Kaifeng Songyun	4–0	Ili Jiucheng	Baotou Rare-Earth Hi-tech Zone Football Park Stadium, Baotou
16:00 UTC+8				Referee: Lin Yang

=== Group E ===
Pos	Team	Pld	W	D	L	GF	GA	GD	Pts	Qualification
1	Shenzhen Juniors	3	3	0	0	3	0	+3	9	Qualification for Final round
2	Shanghai Tongji	3	1	1	1	2	2	0	4	Qualification for Final round
3	Guangxi Yong City	3	1	1	1	1	1	0	4	
4	Shanghai Second	3	0	0	3	1	4	−3	0	

Rules for classification: 1) Points; 2) Head-to-head points; 3) Head-to-head goal difference; 4) Head-to-head goals scored; 5) Goal difference; 6) Goals scored; 7) Disciplinary points (yellow card = 1 point, red card as a result of two yellow cards = 3 points, direct red card = 3 points, yellow card followed by direct red card = 4 points); 8) Drawing of lots.

21 May 2023	Shanghai Tongji	2–1	Shanghai Second	Qiannan Nationwide Fitness Centre Stadium, Duyun
14:00 UTC+8				Referee: Wang Guan

21 May 2023	Shenzhen Juniors	1–0	Guangxi Yong City	Qiannan Nationwide Fitness Centre Stadium, Duyun
17:00 UTC+8				Referee: Yan Cheng

23 May 2023	Guangxi Yong City	1–0	Shanghai Second	Duyun International Football Town Field No.1, Duyun
15:00 UTC+8				Referee: Zhao Ming

23 May 2023	Shenzhen Juniors	1–0	Shanghai Tongji	Qiannan Nationwide Fitness Centre Stadium, Duyun
15:00 UTC+8				Referee: Liu Xun

=== Group F ===
Pos	Team	Pld	W	D	L	GF	GA	GD	Pts	Qualification
1	Guangzhou E-Power	3	3	0	0	13	3	+10	9	Qualification for Final round
2	Guangdong Red Treasure	3	2	0	1	6	7	−1	6	Qualification for Final round
3	(Macau) Chao Pak Kei	3	1	0	2	6	7	−1	3	
4	Xiamen 1026	3	0	0	3	2	10	−8	0	

Rules for classification: 1) Points; 2) Head-to-head points; 3) Head-to-head goal difference; 4) Head-to-head goals scored; 5) Goal difference; 6) Goals scored; 7) Disciplinary points (yellow card = 1 point, red card as a result of two yellow cards = 3 points, direct red card = 3 points, yellow card followed by direct red card = 4 points); 8) Drawing of lots.

29 May 2023	Chao Pak Kei (Macau)	3–1	Xiamen 1026	Sanshui People's Stadium, Foshan
16:30 UTC+8				Referee: Xiong Xing

29 May 2023	Guangzhou E-Power	5–1	Guangdong Red Treasure	Sanshui People's Stadium, Foshan
19:30 UTC+8				Referee: Zhang Yangfan

31 May 2023	Guangzhou E-Power	4–2	(Macau) Chao Pak Kei	Sanshui People's Stadium, Foshan
16:30 UTC+8				Referee: Han Lei

31 May 2023	Guangdong Red Treasure	3–1	Xiamen 1026	Sanshui People's Stadium, Foshan
19:30 UTC+8				Referee: Huang Xiang

=== Group G ===
Pos	Team	Pld	W	D	L	GF	GA	GD	Pts	Qualification
1	Guangxi Hengchen	3	3	0	0	6	2	+4	9	Qualification for Final round
2	Jiangsu Landhouse Dong Victory	3	2	0	1	4	2	+2	6	Qualification for Final round
3	Shanghai Mitsubishi Heavy Industries Flying Lion	3	1	0	2	4	4	0	3	
4	Shanghai Luckystar	3	0	0	3	3	9	−6	0	

Rules for classification: 1) Points; 2) Head-to-head points; 3) Head-to-head goal difference; 4) Head-to-head goals scored; 5) Goal difference; 6) Goals scored; 7) Disciplinary points (yellow card = 1 point, red card as a result of two yellow cards = 3 points, direct red card = 3 points, yellow card followed by direct red card = 4 points); 8) Drawing of lots.

12 June 2023	Jiangsu Landhouse Dong Victory	0–1	Guangxi Hengchen	Nanjing Olympic Sports Centre Outer Field, Nanjing
17:00 UTC+8				Referee: Chen Sijian

12 June 2023	Shanghai Mitsubishi Heavy Industries Flying Lion	3–1	Shanghai Luckystar	Nanjing Youth Olympic Sports Park Stadium, Nanjing
19:00 UTC+8				Referee: Liu Yang

14 June 2023	Shanghai Mitsubishi Heavy Industries Flying Lion	0–1	Jiangsu Landhouse Dong Victory	Nanjing Olympic Sports Centre Outer Field, Nanjing
17:00 UTC+8				Referee: Zhao Ming

14 June 2023	Guangxi Hengchen	3–1	Shanghai Luckystar	Nanjing Youth Olympic Sports Park Stadium, Nanjing
19:00 UTC+8				Referee: Yan Cheng

=== Group H ===
Pos	Team	Pld	W	D	L	GF	GA	GD	Pts	Qualification
1	Quanzhou Qinggong	3	2	1	0	6	2	+4	7	Qualification for Final round
2	Changle Jingangtui	3	2	0	1	4	3	+1	6	Qualification for Final round
3	Zhuhai 2030	3	1	0	2	2	5	−3	3	
4	Yunnan Jin Dal Lae	3	0	1	2	5	7	−2	1	

Rules for classification: 1) Points; 2) Head-to-head points; 3) Head-to-head goal difference; 4) Head-to-head goals scored; 5) Goal difference; 6) Goals scored; 7) Disciplinary points (yellow card = 1 point, red card as a result of two yellow cards = 3 points, direct red card = 3 points, yellow card followed by direct red card = 4 points); 8) Drawing of lots.

18 June 2023	Quanzhou Qinggong	1–0	Changle Jingangtui	Yunnan Kehua Football Training Base Field No.4, Kunming
14:00 UTC+8				Referee: Hu Tengfei

18 June 2023	Zhuhai 2030	2–1	Yunnan Jin Dal Lae	Yunnan Kehua Football Training Base Field No.4, Kunming
17:00 UTC+8				Referee: Zhu Di

20 June 2023	Changle Jingangtui	3–2	Yunnan Jin Dal Lae	Yunnan Kehua Football Training Base Field No.4, Kunming
15:00 UTC+8				Referee: Hu Tengfei

20 June 2023	Quanzhou Qinggong	3–0	Zhuhai 2030	Yunnan Kehua Football Training Base Field No.2, Kunming
15:00 UTC+8				Referee: Zhu Di

== Third-placed playoffs ==
5 May 2023	Gansu Mass Ray	3–0	Shandong Scout	Rizhao International Football Center Training Base Field No.1, Rizhao
13:30 UTC+8				Referee: Yang Song

20 May 2023	Shenzhen Boss United	2–0	Qianxinan Xufengtang	Duyun International Football Town Field No.1, Duyun
14:00 UTC+8				Referee: Zhao Ming

28 May 2023	Chongqing Benbiao	4–1	Xiamen Lujian Tiancheng	Sanshui People's Stadium, Foshan
9:30 UTC+8				Referee: Ding Chao

11 June 2023	Chongqing Rich	2–1	Nanjing Tehu	Nanjing Olympic Sports Centre Outer Field, Nanjing
16:00 UTC+8				Referee: Liu Bao

17 June 2023	The Alliance of Guardians	2–1	Qujing EB	Yunnan Kehua Football Training Base Field No.4, Kunming
14:00 UTC+8				Referee: Ma Zewei

25 June 2023	Changchun Xidu	0–2	Shandong Yuandong	Datong Sports School Stadium, Datong
16:00 UTC+8				Referee: Zhang Long

9 July 2023	Qingdao May Wind	3–3 (0–2 p)	Beijing Smart Sky	Tunliu Sports Center Football Field No.1, Changzhi
15:00 UTC+8				Referee: Zhang Yi

22 July 2023	Kunshan Dianshanhu	0–6	Tianjin Jinchengren	Baotou Rare-Earth Hi-tech Zone Football Park Stadium, Baotou
14:00 UTC+8				Referee: Wang Yang

== Fourth-placed playoffs ==
5 May 2023	Jingchuan Wenhui	0–3	Shijiazhuang Kicker	Rizhao International Football Center Training Base Field No.1, Rizhao
15:30 UTC+8				Referee: Qin Xiaohan

20 May 2023	Liuzhou Ranko	6–1	Qiandongnan Miaoling	Duyun International Football Town Field No.1, Duyun
16:00 UTC+8				Referee: Liu Xun

28 May 2023	Guangxi Junling Feisu	1–2	Chengdu Yuhui Rende	Sanshui People's Stadium, Foshan
16:30 UTC+8				Referee: Yang Song

11 June 2023	Chongqing Huanshengtai	0–0 (5–4 p)	Guangxi Bushan	Nanjing Youth Olympic Sports Park Stadium, Nanjing
17:00 UTC+8				Referee: Chen Bin

17 June 2023	Yichun Wiser	0–5	Yiwu Jinxiu	Yunnan Kehua Football Training Base Field No.4, Kunming
17:00 UTC+8				Referee: Li Qi

25 June 2023	Xinjiang Lingmengzhe	3–1	Yutian Wanfang	Huizhi Innovation City Stadium, Datong
18:00 UTC+8				Referee: Li Yunchao

9 July 2023	Baoding Xuecheng Athletic	1–2	Changzhi Huicheng	Changzhi Sports Center Stadium, Changzhi
17:00 UTC+8				Referee: Zhou Peiheng

22 July 2023	Ningxia Fangzhong	2–0	Inner Mongolia Caoshangfei	Baotou Rare-Earth Hi-tech Zone Football Park Stadium, Baotou
17:00 UTC+8				Referee: Li Qiming

== Final round ==
=== Qualified clubs information ===
Teams	Head Coach	City	Stadium	Capacity
Binzhou Huilong	(Spain) Óscar Céspedes	Binzhou	Weinan Sports Center Stadium (Weinan)	32,000
Changchun Shenhua	(China) Cao Tianbao	Changchun	Changchun Yatai Jingyue Training Ground Main Field	
Changle Jingangtui	(China) Guo Yabin	Fuzhou	Tianjin University-National University of Singapore Joint Institute in Fuzhou Football Field	
Dalian Huayi	(China) Chen Bo	Dalian	Puwan Stadium Side Field	
Dalian Huayi	(China) Chen Bo	Dalian	Dalian Sports Centre Stadium Field 3	
Guangxi Hengchen	(China) Wang Jun	Nanning	Jiuling Lake Football Training Centre Field 1 (Guigang)	
Guangzhou E-Power	(China) Li Bing	Guangzhou	Guangzhou Higher Education Mega Center Central Stadium	39,346
Guangzhou E-Power	(China) Li Bing	Guangzhou	Yuexiushan Stadium	18,000
Guangdong Red Treasure	(China) Chen Weisheng	Guangzhou	Huadu Stadium	13,395
Jiangsu Landhouse Dong Victory	(China) Lu Feng	Nanjing	Nanjing Olympic Sports Centre Side Field	
Kaifeng Songyun	(Japan) Atsushi Nakamura	Kaifeng		
Langfang Glory City	(China) Liu Junwei	Langfang	Langfang Stadium	30,040
Quanzhou Qinggong	(China) Zhao Wanli	Jinjiang	Quanzhou Vocational and Technical University Football Field	
Rizhao Yuqi	(China) Sun Bin	Rizhao	Rizhao International Football Center	12,000
Shanghai Tongji	(China) Xu Lei	Shanghai	Jinshan Sports Centre Side Field	
Shanghai Tongji	(China) Xu Lei	Shanghai	Tongji University 129 Football Field	
Shenzhen Juniors	(China) Zhang Jun	Shenzhen	Shenzhen Football Association Guangming Training Base Field 1	
Wuhan Xiaoma	(Bulgaria) Aleksandar Georgiev	Wuhan	Xinhua Road Sports Center	22,140
Xi'an Chongde Ronghai	(China) Xu Wenbin	Xi'an	Yan'an National Fitness Center (Yan'an)	29,206

=== Qualified clubs locations ===
Location of teams in 2023 China Champions League final round

=== Seeding ===
16 qualified teams were seeded according to their performance in the first stage. The draw was held on 2 August 2023.

Pot 1	Pot 2	Pot 3	Pot 4	Pot 5	Pot 6	Pot 7	Pot 8
Guangzhou E-Power; Changchun Shenhua	Langfang Glory City; Shenzhen Juniors	Rizhao Yuqi; Binzhou Huilong	Quanzhou Qinggong; Guangxi Hengchen	Guangdong Red Treasure; Dalian Huayi	Kaifeng Songyun; Xi'an Chongde Ronghai	Jiangsu Landhouse Dong Victory; Changle Jingangtui	Shanghai Tongji; Wuhan Xiaoma

=== Group A ===
Pos	Team	Pld	W	D	L	GF	GA	GD	Pts	Promotion or qualification
1	Shenzhen Juniors (P)	7	6	1	0	9	1	+8	19	Promotion to League Two and qualification for Final
2	Xi'an Chongde Ronghai (P)	7	4	2	1	13	3	+10	14	Qualification for Promotion play-offs
3	Changchun Shenhua	7	3	4	0	14	5	+9	13	Qualification for Promotion play-offs
4	Rizhao Yuqi (P)	7	3	2	2	8	7	+1	11	Qualification for Promotion play-offs
5	Shanghai Tongji	7	2	2	3	8	8	0	8	Qualification for Promotion play-offs
6	Jiangsu Landhouse Dong Victory	7	1	2	4	8	10	−2	5	
7	Quanzhou Qinggong	7	0	4	3	7	12	−5	4	
8	Guangdong Red Treasure	7	0	1	6	5	26	−21	1	

Rules for classification: 1) Points; 2) Head-to-head points; 3) Head-to-head goal difference; 4) Head-to-head goals scored; 5) Goal difference; 6) Goals scored; 7) Disciplinary points (yellow card = 1 point, red card as a result of two yellow cards = 3 points, direct red card = 3 points, yellow card followed by direct red card = 4 points); 8) Drawing of lots.
(P) Promoted

=== Group B ===
Pos	Team	Pld	W	D	L	GF	GA	GD	Pts	Promotion or qualification
1	Langfang Glory City (C, P)	7	5	2	0	18	4	+14	17	Promotion to League Two and qualification for Final
2	Guangzhou E-Power (P)	7	5	0	2	26	5	+21	15	Qualification for Promotion play-offs
3	Dalian Huayi (P)	7	4	2	1	22	5	+17	14	Qualification for Promotion play-offs
4	Binzhou Huilong (O, P)	7	4	1	2	29	3	+26	13	Qualification for Promotion play-offs
5	Guangxi Hengchen (O, P)	7	4	0	3	20	9	+11	12	Qualification for Promotion play-offs
6	Wuhan Xiaoma	7	2	1	4	16	20	−4	7	
7	Changle Jingangtui	7	1	0	6	3	43	−40	3	
8	Kaifeng Songyun	7	0	0	7	3	48	−45	0	

Rules for classification: 1) Points; 2) Head-to-head points; 3) Head-to-head goal difference; 4) Head-to-head goals scored; 5) Goal difference; 6) Goals scored; 7) Disciplinary points (yellow card = 1 point, red card as a result of two yellow cards = 3 points, direct red card = 3 points, yellow card followed by direct red card = 4 points); 8) Drawing of lots.
(C) Champions; (O) Play-off winners; (P) Promoted

=== Results ===
==== Group A ====
Home \ Away	CCS	GRT	JSL	QZQ	RZY	SHT	SZJ	XCR
Changchun Shenhua	—	7–1	1–1	–	–	–	1–1	1–1
Guangdong Red Treasure	–	—	–	2–2	0–3	0–4	–	–
Jiangsu Landhouse Dong Victory	–	5–1	—	–	–	0–1	0–1	–
Quanzhou Qinggong	1–2	–	1–1	—	–	2–2	–	0–3
Rizhao Yuqi	0–2	–	2–1	1–1	—	–	–	0–0
Shanghai Tongji	0–0	–	–	–	1–2	—	0–1	–
Shenzhen Juniors	–	2–0	–	1–0	2–0	–	—	1–0
Xi'an Chongde Ronghai	–	3–1	3–0	–	–	3–0	–	—

Legend: Blue = home team win; Yellow = draw; Red = away team win.
For upcoming matches, an "a" indicates there is an article about the rivalry between the two participants.

==== Group B ====
Home \ Away	BZH	CLJ	DLH	GXH	GEP	KFS	LGC	WHX
Binzhou Huilong	—	–	1–1	–	0–1	9–0	–	7–0
Changle Jingangtui	0–10	—	–	1–3	–	2–1	–	–
Dalian Huayi	–	9–0	—	–	–	5–0	0–0	–
Guangxi Hengchen	0–2	–	3–1	—	1–3	10–1	–	3–0
Guangzhou E-Power	–	8–0	0–1	–	—	12–0	0–2	2–1
Kaifeng Songyun	–	–	–	–	–	—	–	–
Langfang Glory City	1–0	6–0	–	1–0	–	5–1	—	3–3
Wuhan Xiaoma	–	6–0	1–5	–	–	5–0	–	—

Legend: Blue = home team win; Yellow = draw; Red = away team win.
For upcoming matches, an "a" indicates there is an article about the rivalry between the two participants.

=== Promotion play-offs ===
==== First round ====
21 October 2023	Xi'an Chongde Ronghai	0–0 (3–4 p)	Guangxi Hengchen	Yan'an
14:00 UTC+8				Stadium: Yan'an Nationwide Fitness Sports Center; Attendance: 237; Referee: Xu Qiangqiang
	Penalties
	Ilhamjan Iminjan (penalty scored); Wang Qing (penalty missed); Ma Long (penalty scored); Zhang Cheng (penalty scored); Ye Qian (penalty missed)		(penalty scored) Li Hanbo; (penalty scored) Cui Jiaqi; (penalty missed) Liu Hao; (penalty scored) Jiang Zejun; (penalty scored) Yang Yun

21 October 2023	Dalian Huayi	1–1 (2–3 p)	Rizhao Yuqi	Dalian
15:00 UTC+8	Baxtiyar Pezila 44'		31' Pan Yuchen	Stadium: Dalian Sports Centre Stadium Field 3 Attendance: 166; Referee: Liang Caiwei
	Penalties
	Wu Dingmao (penalty scored); Li Zhongting (penalty missed); Li Xudong (penalty scored); Song Xiaoyu (penalty missed); Elizat Abdureshit (penalty missed)		(penalty scored) Li Minhui; (penalty scored) Wang Zeyang; (penalty scored) Cheng Yuan; (penalty missed) Lu Chenghe

21 October 2023	Binzhou Huilong	1–1 (3–2 p)	Changchun Shenhua	Weinan
15:00 UTC+8	Pang Zhiquan 50'		61' Hou Zhe	Stadium: Weinan Sports Center Stadium; Attendance: 23,664; Referee: Niu Minghui
	Penalties
	Zhang Yuxuan (penalty scored); Ding Jie (penalty scored); Wen Wubin (penalty missed); Mi Haolun (penalty scored)		(penalty scored) Hou Zhe; (penalty missed) Wang Hao; (penalty missed) Li Shanglin; (penalty scored) Sheng Pengfei; (penalty missed) Wu Linfeng

22 October 2023	Guangzhou E-Power	2–1	Shanghai Tongji	Guangzhou
16:00 UTC+8	Liang Xueming 14' (pen.); Zhang Xiao 73'		11' Yang Chao	Stadium: Yuexiushan Stadium; Attendance: 510; Referee: Dan Ning

==== Second round ====
28 October 2023	Guangxi Hengchen	1–1 (5–4 p)	Rizhao Yuqi	Guigang
16:00 UTC+8	Enqer Erkin 80'		52' Lu Chenghe	Stadium: Jiuling Lake Football Training Centre Field 1 Attendance: 666; Referee: Ma Yunkun
	Penalties
	Cui Jiaqi (penalty scored); Liu Hao (penalty scored); Jiang Zejun (penalty scored); Enqer Erkin (penalty scored); Yang Bing (penalty scored)		(penalty scored) Pan Yuchen; (penalty scored) Wang Zeyang; (penalty scored) Li Jiajun; (penalty scored) Wang Junhao; (penalty missed) Chang Ruiqi

28 October 2023	Guangzhou E-Power	1–2	Binzhou Huilong	Guangzhou
16:00 UTC+8	Xiao Zhi 68' (pen.)		26' Ma Yangyang; 45+1' Pang Zhiquan	Stadium: Guangzhou Higher Education Mega Center Central Stadium; Attendance: 4,851; Referee: Li Zheng

=== Final ===
29 October 2023	Langfang Glory City	1–1	Shenzhen Juniors	Langfang
14:30 UTC+8	Yang Xudong 44'		90+1' Liu Sheng	Stadium: Langfang Stadium; Attendance: 932; Referee: Meng Xiangkun

3 November 2023	Shenzhen Juniors	1–1 (2–2 agg.) (2–4 p)	Langfang Glory City	Shenzhen
19:30 UTC+8	Luan Haodong 21' (o.g.)		3' Yang Xudong	Stadium: Shenzhen Football Association Guangming Training Base Field 1 Attendance: 550; Referee: Zhang Lei
	Penalties
	Yang Bin (penalty missed); Xie Baoxian (penalty scored); Chen Yajun (penalty missed); Chen Xiao (penalty scored)		(penalty scored) Luan Haodong; (penalty scored) Li Siqi; (penalty missed) Lu Jianchen; (penalty scored) Chen Xiteng; (penalty scored) Tan Fucheng

2–2 on aggregate. Langfang Glory City won 4–2 on penalties.

== Final round attendance ==
As of 14 October 2023
In this attendance table, only regular final round group stage matches are counted.

Pos	Team	Total	High	Low	Average	Change
1	Binzhou Huilong	90,585	26,156	15,347	22,646	n/a
2	Guangzhou E-Power	12,880	4,097	997	2,576	n/a
3	Rizhao Yuqi	7,116	4,137	386	1,779	n/a
4	Guangdong Red Treasure	2,991	1,380	755	997	n/a
5	Langfang Glory City	4,727	1,613	513	945	n/a
6	Changchun Shenhua	1,558	829	116	390	n/a
7	Quanzhou Qinggong	1,468	516	87	367	n/a
8	Xi'an Chongde Ronghai	1,083	550	168	361	n/a
9	Shanghai Tongji	1,062	521	85	354	n/a
10	Shenzhen Juniors	1,414	561	186	354	n/a
11	Changle Jingangtui	659	345	58	220	n/a
12	Dalian Huayi	635	321	103	212	n/a
13	Jiangsu Landhouse Dong Victory	591	239	136	197	n/a
14	Guangxi Hengchen	953	312	91	191	n/a
15	Wuhan Xiaoma	465	171	138	155	n/a
16	Kaifeng Songyun	0	0	0	0	n/a
	League total	128,187	26,156	58	2,289	n/a

Updated to games played on 14 October 2023
