= Shaanxi Chang'an Athletic F.C. =

Chinese football club

Shaanxi Chang'an Athletic Shǎnxī Cháng'ān Jìngjì 陕西长安竞技
- Full name: Shaanxi Chang'an Athletic Football Club 陕西长安竞技足球俱乐部
- Nickname(s): 西北狼 (North West Wolves)
- Founded: 30 March 2016; 8 years ago
- Dissolved: 29 March 2023; 23 months ago

Shaanxi Chang'an Athletic Football Club (Chinese: 陕西长安竞技足球俱乐部) was a Chinese professional football club based in Xi'an, Shaanxi. The club was dissolved in March 2023 as a China League One club.

== History ==
Shaanxi Chang'an Athletic was founded on 30 March 2016 by co-raise funds of eight companies based in Xi'an and the name of the ancient capital and the name of the city it is based before it is changed to Xi'an. They played in the 2016 China Amateur Football League and won the winners of 2016 Shaanxi Provincial Super League and the first place of northwest region final–group A successively. Shaanxi Chang'an Athletic finished the runners-up in the national finals after losing Dalian Boyang in the penalty shoot-out but won promotion to 2017 China League Two. The team was third place in the 2018 China League Two, though losing to Meizhou Meixian Techand F.C. in the relegation play-offs, the team was promoted to the China League One due to the financial problem of the Yanbian Funde F.C. With the club within the second tier the Shaanxi Water Affairs Group Co., Ltd. would become the clubs majority shareholder.

== Managerial history ==
- (China) Huang Hongyi (2016–2017)
- (China) Zhao Changhong (2018)
- (China) Xie Yuxin (2018)
- (China) Zhang Jun (2019)
- (China) Wang Bo (2019)
- (South Korea) Kim Bong-gil (2019–2020)
- (Spain) Óscar Céspedes (2021)
- (China) Feng Feng (caretaker) (2021–2022)
- (China) Wang Baoshan (2022)
- (China) Feng Feng (caretaker) (2022–2023)

== Results ==
All-time league rankings

As of the end of 2022 season.

Year	Div	Pld	W	D	L	GF	GA	GD	Pts	Pos.	FA Cup	Super Cup	AFC	Att./G	Stadium
2016	4									RU	DNQ	DNQ	DNQ		
2017	3	24	12	7	5	26	15	11	43	7	R2	DNQ	DNQ	16,957	Shaanxi Province Stadium
2018	3	31	18	4	9	44	20	24	58	3	R4	DNQ	DNQ	17,001	Shaanxi Province Stadium
2019	2	30	13	5	12	39	37	2	44	9	R4	DNQ	DNQ	24,377	Shaanxi Province Stadium
2020	2	15	5	6	4	14	13	1	21	11	DNQ	DNQ	DNQ		
2021	2	34	17	11	6	55	30	25	62	6	R16	DNQ	DNQ		
2022	2	34	18	8	8	55	32	23	56^{1}	5	R1	DNQ	DNQ		

- ^1 Shaanxi Chang'an Athletic had 6 points deducted due to unpaid salaries on 23 November 2022.

Key

	China top division
	China second division
	China third division
	China fourth division
W	Winners
RU	Runners-up
3	Third place
	Relegated

- Pld = Played
- W = Games won
- D = Games drawn
- L = Games lost
- F = Goals for
- A = Goals against
- Pts = Points
- Pos = Final position
- DNQ = Did not qualify
- DNE = Did not enter
- NH = Not Held
- – = Does Not Exist
- R1 = Round 1
- R2 = Round 2
- R3 = Round 3
- R4 = Round 4
- F = Final
- SF = Semi-finals
- QF = Quarter-finals
- R16 = Round of 16
- Group = Group stage
- GS2 = Second Group stage
- QR1 = First Qualifying Round
- QR2 = Second Qualifying Round
- QR3 = Third Qualifying Round
