= List of Chinese football transfers winter 2025 =

This is a list of Chinese football transfers for the 2025 season winter transfer window. Only transfers featuring the Chinese Super League, China League One, and China League Two are listed. The 2025 winter transfer window opened on 6 January 2025 and closed on 18 February 2025 for the Chinese Super League, 28 February 2025 for China League One, and 7 March 2025 for China League Two.

== Transfers ==
All players and clubs without a flag are affiliated with the Chinese Football Association.

Date (Note: Earlier date of the transfer announcement of either of the departing club or the arriving club, or latest possible date if announced after deadline day. Transfers or loans without a public announcement from either club are not listed.)	Player	Moving from	Moving to	Fee
13 October 2024	Guo Mengjie	Beijing IT	Retired	Free
13 October 2024	Guo Mengyuan	Beijing IT	Retired	Free
13 October 2024	Li Xiangyu	Beijing IT	Retired	Free
20 October 2024	Xiao Zhi	Guangdong GZ-Power	Retired	Free
24 October 2024	Ma Xiaolei	Shaanxi Union	Retired	Free
27 October 2024	Ge Zhen	Qingdao West Coast	Retired	Free
27 October 2024	Tian Yong	Qingdao West Coast	Retired	Free
8 November 2024	Lei Yongchi	Liaoning Tieren	Retired	Free
12 December 2024	Liu Chaoyang	Qingdao Hainiu	(Thailand) Chiangmai	Free
12 December 2024	Yu Yang	Tianjin Jinmen Tiger	Retired	Free
17 December 2024	Lian Chen	Qingdao Red Lions	Retired	Free
24 December 2024	(Zimbabwe) Nyasha Mushekwi	Yunnan Yukun	Dalian K'un City	Free
24 December 2024	(Brazil) Ronan	Yanbian Longding	(South Korea) Jeonnam Dragons	Free
25 December 2024	(Brazil) Oscar	Shanghai Port	(Brazil) São Paulo	Free
31 December 2024	(Nigeria) Samuel Adegbenro	Beijing Guoan	Free agent	Free
31 December 2024	Cao Yunding	Shanghai Shenhua	Retired	Free
31 December 2024	Wang Weicheng	Chongqing Tonglianglong	Free agent	Free
31 December 2024	Wu Qing	Chongqing Tonglianglong	Retired	Free
31 December 2024	Xiang Liyijie	Chongqing Tonglianglong	Free agent	Free
31 December 2024	Yu Dabao	Beijing Guoan	Retired	Free
31 December 2024	Zhao Hejing	Chongqing Tonglianglong	Retired	Free
31 December 2024	Zhao Mingjian	Dalian Yingbo	Retired	Free
1 January 2025	Lin Longchang	Liaoning Tieren	Dalian K'un City	Free
1 January 2025	(Nigeria) Sabir Musa	Liaoning Tieren	Dalian K'un City	Free
2 January 2025	Cui Ming'an	Yunnan Yukun	Dalian K'un City	Free
2 January 2025	(Portugal) Fábio Fortes	Jiangxi Lushan	(Portugal) Paredes	Free
2 January 2025	Wang Hao	Shanghai Shenhua	Dalian K'un City	Free
3 January 2025	Fan Jinming	Zhejiang	Dalian K'un City	Free
3 January 2025	Ning Fangze	Zhejiang	Dalian K'un City	Free
4 January 2025	Lei Wenjie	Shanghai Port	Dalian K'un City	Free
4 January 2025	Song Zhiwei	Shijiazhuang Gongfu	Dalian K'un City	Free
5 January 2025	Ji Zhengyu	Guangdong GZ-Power	Dalian K'un City	Free
5 January 2025	Qian Junhao	Liaoning Tieren	Dalian K'un City	Free
6 January 2025	(Brazil) Saulo Mineiro	(Brazil) Ceará	Shanghai Shenhua	US$950,000
6 January 2025	(Hong Kong) Sun Ming Him	Cangzhou Mighty Lions	Tianjin Jinmen Tiger	Free
7 January 2025	(Brazil) Jefferson Nem	Nanjing City	(Brazil) Velo Clube	Free
7 January 2025	Zhang Xiaobin	Wuhan Three Towns	Shenzhen Peng City	Free
8 January 2025	(Colombia) Juan Alegría	Guangzhou	(Portugal) Portimonense	Free
8 January 2025	(Italy) Martin Boakye	Qingdao Hainiu	(Thailand) Buriram United	Free
8 January 2025	Cheng Yuelei	Meizhou Hakka	Shenzhen Juniors	Free
8 January 2025	(Portugal) Joaquim Domingos	(Lithuania) Džiugas Telšiai	Yanbian Longding	Free
8 January 2025	(Portugal) Nené	(Poland) Jagiellonia Białystok	Yunnan Yukun	Undisclosed
8 January 2025	Pan Ximing	Meizhou Hakka	Liaoning Tieren	Free
8 January 2025	Marcel Petrov	(Slovenia) Olimpija Ljubljana	Shanghai Shenhua	Free
8 January 2025	(Argentina) Matías Vargas	Shanghai Port	(Saudi Arabia) Al Fateh	Free
8 January 2025	Wang Shilong	Guangzhou	Shanghai Shenhua	Free
8 January 2025	Nico Yennaris	Beijing Guoan	Shanghai Shenhua	Free
8 January 2025	Zhang Wei	Shanghai Shenhua	Tianjin Jinmen Tiger	Loan
8 January 2025	(Austria) Peter Žulj	Changchun Yatai	(Thailand) Buriram United	Free
9 January 2025	Chen Zhaoyang	Guizhou Zhucheng Athletic	Free agent	Free
9 January 2025	Gao Jiarun	Guangxi Pingguo	Liaoning Tieren	Free
9 January 2025	Ji Jiabao	Qingdao West Coast	Shenzhen Peng City	Free
9 January 2025	(Morocco) Zakaria Labyad	Yunnan Yukun	Dalian Yingbo	Free
9 January 2025	Liu Wenqing	Guizhou Zhucheng Athletic	Free agent	Free
9 January 2025	Mao Shiming	Guizhou Zhucheng Athletic	Free agent	Free
9 January 2025	(Brazil) Matheus Pato	Shandong Taishan	(Indonesia) Borneo Samarinda	Free
9 January 2025	(Croatia) Mile Škorić	Tianjin Jinmen Tiger	(Croatia) Rijeka	Free
9 January 2025	Wang Xiaofan	Guizhou Zhucheng Athletic	Free agent	Free
9 January 2025	Wu Tao	Guizhou Zhucheng Athletic	Free agent	Free
9 January 2025	Yang Jiutian	Guizhou Zhucheng Athletic	Free agent	Free
9 January 2025	Yu Shang	Guizhou Zhucheng Athletic	Free agent	Free
9 January 2025	Zheng Feng	Guizhou Zhucheng Athletic	Free agent	Free
10 January 2025	Jiang Zhipeng	Wuhan Three Towns	Shenzhen Peng City	Free
10 January 2025	(Spain) Cristian Salvador	(Spain) Elche	Tianjin Jinmen Tiger	Undisclosed
10 January 2025	Tian Yinong	Shenzhen Peng City	Liaoning Tieren	Free
10 January 2025	Zhao Jianbo	Yunnan Yukun	Liaoning Tieren	Undisclosed
11 January 2025	(Norway) Ohi Omoijuanfo	(Denmark) Brøndby	Changchun Yatai	Undisclosed
11 January 2025	(Cameroon) Serge Tabekou	Chongqing Tonglianglong	(Cyprus) Nea Salamis Famagusta	Free
11 January 2025	Wen Jiabao	Shanghai Shenhua	Dalian Yingbo	Free
12 January 2025	(Costa Rica) Felicio Brown Forbes	(Thailand) Muangthong United	Yanbian Longding	Free
12 January 2025	Zhao Jianan	Yunnan Yukun	Dalian Yingbo	Free
13 January 2025	Gan Xianhao	Ganzhou Ruishi	Shenzhen Juniors	Free
13 January 2025	Li Peng	Yunnan Yukun	Liaoning Tieren	Free
13 January 2025	Liu Yi	Yunnan Yukun	Dalian Yingbo	Free
13 January 2025	Luo Senwen	Wuhan Three Towns	Qingdao Hainiu	Free
13 January 2025	Tian Yifan	Dalian Yingbo	Shenzhen Juniors	Free
13 January 2025	Xu Dong	Qingdao Hainiu	Liaoning Tieren	Free
14 January 2025	Cao Haiqing	Yunnan Yukun	Dalian Yingbo	Free
14 January 2025	Feng Boyuan	Henan	Qingdao Hainiu	Free
14 January 2025	Huang Jiajun	Suzhou Dongwu	Shenzhen Juniors	Free
14 January 2025	Sherzat Nur	Hubei Istar	Liaoning Tieren	Loan
14 January 2025	Zang Yifeng	Yunnan Yukun	Liaoning Tieren	Free
14 January 2025	Zhao Shijie	Jiangxi Dark Horse Junior	Shenzhen Juniors	Free
15 January 2025	Han Rongze	Shandong Taishan	Qingdao Hainiu	Free
15 January 2025	(Switzerland) Cephas Malele	Shanghai Shenhua	Dalian Yingbo	Free
15 January 2025	Sun Weijia	Qingdao Hainiu	Liaoning Tieren	Undisclosed
15 January 2025	(Mali) Mamadou Traoré	Beijing Guoan	Dalian Yingbo	Free
15 January 2025	Yerjet Yerzat	Qingdao West Coast	Chongqing Tonglianglong	Free
15 January 2025	Zhang Wentao	Guangxi Pingguo	Guizhou Zhucheng Athletic	Free
16 January 2025	Bai Zijian	Liaoning Tieren	Free agent	Free
16 January 2025	(Brazil) Felipe	(Brazil) Goiás	Liaoning Tieren	Free
16 January 2025	Han Tianlin	Liaoning Tieren	Free agent	Free
16 January 2025	Huang Zihao	Nanjing City	Dalian Yingbo	Free
16 January 2025	Lin Chuangyi	Shenzhen Peng City	Qingdao Hainiu	Free
16 January 2025	Liu Ziming	Liaoning Tieren	Shijiazhuang Gongfu	Free
16 January 2025	Piao Shihao	Qingdao West Coast	Yanbian Longding	Free
16 January 2025	(Lithuania) Rimvydas Sadauskas	Guangzhou	Chongqing Tonglianglong	Free
16 January 2025	Wu Xinrui	Foshan Nanshi	Guangxi Union	Free
16 January 2025	Yang Shengming	Liaoning Tieren	Free agent	Free
16 January 2025	(Hong Kong) Yu Joy Yin	(Hong Kong) Eastern	Shijiazhuang Gongfu	Free
17 January 2025	Bi Haoyang	Yunnan Yukun	Free agent	Free
17 January 2025	Chen Chenzhenyang	Yunnan Yukun	Guizhou Zhucheng Athletic	Free
17 January 2025	Cui Qi	Changchun Yatai	Dalian Yingbo	Free
17 January 2025	Du Jinlong	Yunnan Yukun	Free agent	Free
17 January 2025	(Brazil) Giovanny	Guangxi Pingguo	(Brazil) Juventude	Free
17 January 2025	Gu Bin	Zhejiang	(Hong Kong) Eastern	Free
17 January 2025	He Chao	Wuhan Three Towns	Henan	Free
17 January 2025	Huang Xuheng	Qingdao Red Lions	Chongqing Tonglianglong	Undisclosed
17 January 2025	Jin Yangyang	Shanghai Shenhua	Qingdao Hainiu	Free
17 January 2025	Li Tenglong	Henan	Free agent	Free
17 January 2025	Li Xingxian	Guangzhou	Henan	Free
17 January 2025	Liu Yi	Yunnan Yukun	Retired	Free
17 January 2025	Liu Yuhao	Yunnan Yukun	Free agent	Free
17 January 2025	Yang Yun	Cangzhou Mighty Lions	Shijiazhuang Gongfu	Free
17 January 2025	Yin Hongbo	Meizhou Hakka	Henan	Free
17 January 2025	Zheng Dalun	Cangzhou Mighty Lions	Henan	Free
18 January 2025	He Xiaoqiang	Beijing Guoan	Chongqing Tonglianglong	Undisclosed
18 January 2025	(Ghana) Nassam Ibrahim	Suzhou Dongwu	Hong Kong Rangers	Free
18 January 2025	Jiang Ning	Qingdao Hainiu	Retired	Free
18 January 2025	Lin Xiang	Shanghai Jiading Huilong	Shijiazhuang Gongfu	Free
18 January 2025	Liu Zhenli	Qingdao Hainiu	Retired	Free
18 January 2025	Ma Yujun	Beijing Guoan	Chongqing Tonglianglong	Undisclosed
18 January 2025	Ruan Qilong	Beijing Guoan	Chongqing Tonglianglong	Undisclosed
18 January 2025	Yang He	Nanjing City	Yunnan Yukun	Free
19 January 2025	Gao Jialiang	Jiangxi Dark Horse Junior	Shenzhen Juniors	Free
19 January 2025	He Wei	Shijiazhuang Gongfu	Wuxi Wugo	Free
19 January 2025	Li Boxi	Beijing Guoan	Wuxi Wugo	Free
19 January 2025	Li Endian	Ganzhou Ruishi	Guangxi Union	Free
19 January 2025	Li Songyi	Henan	Yunnan Yukun	Free
19 January 2025	Ma Zhen	Shanghai Shenhua	Yunnan Yukun	Loan
19 January 2025	(Hong Kong) Ng Yu Hei	(Hong Kong) Eastern	Chongqing Tonglianglong	Undisclosed
19 January 2025	Ouyang Bang	Dalian K'un City	Shijiazhuang Gongfu	Free
19 January 2025	Wang Chengkuai	Yanbian Longding	Dalian Yingbo	Free
19 January 2025	Ye Chugui	Meizhou Hakka	Yunnan Yukun	Free
19 January 2025	Zeng Yuming	Lanzhou Longyuan Athletic	Shenzhen Juniors	Free
19 January 2025	Zhang Chenliang	Shijiazhuang Gongfu	Yunnan Yukun	Free
19 January 2025	Zhang Yujie	Jiangxi Dingnan United	Shenzhen Peng City	Free
20 January 2025	Kudirat Ablet	Chongqing Tonglianglong	Liaoning Tieren	Free
20 January 2025	(North Macedonia) Isnik Alimi	(Romania) Sepsi OSK	Dalian Yingbo	Undisclosed
20 January 2025	Bu Xin	Shijiazhuang Gongfu	Shanghai Jiading Huilong	Free
20 January 2025	Chen Jiaqi	Qingdao Hainiu	Dalian K'un City	Loan
20 January 2025	Duan Dezhi	Beijing Guoan	Yunnan Yukun	Free
20 January 2025	Ji Xinlong	Hangzhou Linping Wuyue	Guangxi Hengchen	Free
20 January 2025	Li Siqi	Hangzhou Linping Wuyue	Guangxi Hengchen	Free
20 January 2025	Luan Haodong	Hangzhou Linping Wuyue	Guangxi Hengchen	Free
20 January 2025	Abduhelil Osmanjan	Qingdao West Coast	Chongqing Tonglianglong	Loan
20 January 2025	(Austria) Manprit Sarkaria	(Austria) Sturm Graz	Shenzhen Peng City	Undisclosed
20 January 2025	Song Yue	Shenzhen Peng City	Dalian Yingbo	Free
20 January 2025	Sun Xuelong	Tianjin Jinmen Tiger	Yunnan Yukun	Free
20 January 2025	Wang Xuanhong	Dalian Yingbo	Retired	Free
20 January 2025	Wei Chaolun	Hangzhou Linping Wuyue	Guangxi Hengchen	Free
20 January 2025	(South Korea) Yeon Jei-min	Suzhou Dongwu	(South Korea) Hwaseong	Free
20 January 2025	Zhan Sainan	Liaoning Tieren	Shijiazhuang Gongfu	Undisclosed
20 January 2025	Zhang Yufeng	Changchun Yatai	Yunnan Yukun	Free
21 January 2025	Bai Jiajun	Guangxi Pingguo	Shanghai Jiading Huilong	Free
21 January 2025	Gou Junchen	Hangzhou Linping Wuyue	Wuxi Wugo	Free
21 January 2025	(Brazil) Leonardo	Suzhou Dongwu	Chongqing Tonglianglong	Free
21 January 2025	Liao Jintao	Guangzhou	Dalian Yingbo	Free
21 January 2025	Lü Chen	Changchun Yatai	Dalian K'un City	Free
21 January 2025	Lü Pin	Guangxi Pingguo	Dalian K'un City	Free
21 January 2025	(Republic of the Congo) Guy Mbenza	(Qatar) Muaither	Liaoning Tieren	Free
21 January 2025	(Brazil) Olávio	(Brazil) Athletic (MG)	Shijiazhuang Gongfu	Free
21 January 2025	Sun Xinkai	Shanghai Shenhua	Guizhou Zhucheng Athletic	Free
21 January 2025	Wu Yizhen	Foshan Nanshi	Shanghai Jiading Huilong	Free
21 January 2025	Wu Zhongcan	Zhejiang	Guizhou Zhucheng Athletic	Free
21 January 2025	Yin Congyao	Meizhou Hakka	Yunnan Yukun	Free
21 January 2025	Zhang Xiangshuo	Guangxi Pingguo	Yunnan Yukun	Free
22 January 2025	(Brazil) Dankler	(Brazil) Vila Nova	Shijiazhuang Gongfu	Free
22 January 2025	Liang Junjie	Guangxi Pingguo	Guangxi Union	Free
22 January 2025	Ma Kunyue	Jiangxi Lushan	Dalian K'un City	Free
22 January 2025	Zhang Dachi	Guangzhou	Wuxi Wugo	Free
22 January 2025	Zhao Shuhao	Shaanxi Union	Dalian K'un City	Free
22 January 2025	Zheng Xuejian	Zhejiang	Nanjing City	Free
23 January 2025	(Chinese Taipei) Chen Hao-wei	Qingdao Red Lions	Free agent	Free
23 January 2025	Chen Junhan	Shenzhen Juniors	Free agent	Free
23 January 2025	Chen Long	Qingdao Red Lions	Free agent	Free
23 January 2025	(Angola) Hélder Costa	(Portugal) Estoril	Yunnan Yukun	Undisclosed
23 January 2025	Geng Xianglong	Xiamen 1026	Guizhou Zhucheng Athletic	Free
23 January 2025	Guo Tong	Suzhou Dongwu	Guizhou Zhucheng Athletic	Free
23 January 2025	Jadson	Shandong Taishan	Free agent	Free
23 January 2025	Li Bin	Shenzhen Juniors	Free agent	Free
23 January 2025	Li Tongrui	Qingdao Red Lions	Free agent	Free
23 January 2025	Liu Hao	Guizhou Zhucheng Athletic	Guangxi Pingguo	Free
23 January 2025	Liu Sheng	Shenzhen Juniors	Free agent	Free
23 January 2025	Liu Yang	Guangxi Pingguo	Shanghai Jiading Huilong	Free
23 January 2025	Long Wenhao	Shenzhen Juniors	Free agent	Free
23 January 2025	(Spain) Jorge Ortiz	Shenzhen Peng City	(India) Mumbai City	Undisclosed
23 January 2025	(Spain) Alberto Quiles	(Spain) Albacete	Tianjin Jinmen Tiger	Undisclosed
23 January 2025	(France) Yaya Sanogo	Qingdao Red Lions	Free agent	Free
23 January 2025	Sun Weizhe	Guangxi Pingguo	Shanghai Jiading Huilong	Loan
23 January 2025	Wei Minghe	Guangxi Lanhang	Shaanxi Union	Free
23 January 2025	Wei Yuren	Nanjing City	Shaanxi Union	Free
23 January 2025	Wen Ruijie	Shenzhen Juniors	Free agent	Free
23 January 2025	Yao Haoyang	Hubei Istar	Chongqing Tonglianglong	Loan
23 January 2025	Zhang Jiajie	Shenzhen Juniors	Free agent	Free
23 January 2025	Zhou Weijun	Shenzhen Juniors	Free agent	Free
24 January 2025	Mirzat Ali	Dalian K'un City	Shaanxi Union	Free
24 January 2025	Cai Haochen	Dalian K'un City	Free agent	Free
24 January 2025	Chen Yanpu	Hangzhou Linping Wuyue	Shaanxi Union	Free
24 January 2025	Cong Zhen	Dalian K'un City	Free agent	Free
24 January 2025	Ding Quancheng	Guangxi Hengchen	Guangxi Pingguo	Free
24 January 2025	Ge Yuxiang	Dalian K'un City	Free agent	Free
24 January 2025	(Armenia) Varazdat Haroyan	Qingdao West Coast	(Armenia) Pyunik	Free
24 January 2025	Huo Liang	Dalian K'un City	Free agent	Free
24 January 2025	Li Mengke	Dalian K'un City	Free agent	Free
24 January 2025	Li Xuebo	Liaoning Tieren	Shanghai Jiading Huilong	Free
24 January 2025	Li Yongjia	Meizhou Hakka	Tianjin Jinmen Tiger	Undisclosed
24 January 2025	Liu Jiaxin	Dalian K'un City	Free agent	Free
24 January 2025	Liu Xinyu	Hunan Billows	Shanghai Jiading Huilong	Free
24 January 2025	(Brazil) Lucas Maia	(Brazil) Paysandu	Henan	Free
24 January 2025	(Spain) José Martínez	(Spain) Córdoba	Yunnan Yukun	Free
24 January 2025	Baxtiyar Pezila	Dalian K'un City	Free agent	Free
24 January 2025	(Colombia) Brayan Riascos	Qingdao West Coast	(Uzbekistan) Pakhtakor	Free
24 January 2025	Shao Puliang	Cangzhou Mighty Lions	Wuhan Three Towns	Free
24 January 2025	Sodorhu	Dalian K'un City	Free agent	Free
24 January 2025	Wang Jinxian	Changchun Yatai	Wuhan Three Towns	Free
24 January 2025	Xu Xin	Dalian K'un City	Free agent	Free
24 January 2025	Yang Fan	Dalian K'un City	Free agent	Free
24 January 2025	Yang Jingfan	Yanbian Longding	Guangxi Pingguo	Undisclosed
24 January 2025	Yao Diran	Shaanxi Union	Guangxi Pingguo	Undisclosed
24 January 2025	Yu Zeyuan	Dalian K'un City	Free agent	Free
24 January 2025	Zhang Song	Unattached	Guangxi Pingguo	Free
25 January 2025	Bai Mingyu	Shaanxi Union	Free agent	Free
25 January 2025	Bai Yutao	Guangzhou	Chongqing Tonglianglong	Free
25 January 2025	Chen Shaohao	Guangxi Lanhang	Guangxi Pingguo	Free
25 January 2025	Chen Xing	Shaanxi Union	Free agent	Free
25 January 2025	(Serbia) Đorđe Denić	Henan	(Turkey) Pendikspor	Free
25 January 2025	Huang Wei	Foshan Nanshi	Guangxi Pingguo	Free
25 January 2025	(Serbia) Branimir Jočić	(Serbia) Tekstilac Odžaci	Meizhou Hakka	Free
25 January 2025	Parmanjan Kyum	Shaanxi Union	Free agent	Free
25 January 2025	Li Chen	Shaanxi Union	Free agent	Free
25 January 2025	Liao Chengjian	Changchun Yatai	Wuhan Three Towns	Free
25 January 2025	Liu Yun	Changchun Yatai	Meizhou Hakka	Free
25 January 2025	Luo Xin	Nantong Zhiyun	Foshan Nanshi	Free
25 January 2025	(Democratic Republic of the Congo) Mayingila Nzuzi Mata	(Turkey) Esenler Erokspor	Shenzhen Juniors	Free
25 January 2025	Pang Zhiquan	Shaanxi Union	Free agent	Free
25 January 2025	(Brazil) Pedro Henrique	(United Arab Emirates) Khor Fakkan	Yunnan Yukun	Undisclosed
25 January 2025	Pei Shuai	Shaanxi Union	Free agent	Free
25 January 2025	Wang Lingke	Shijiazhuang Gongfu	Guangxi Pingguo	Free
25 January 2025	Wen Da	Cangzhou Mighty Lions	Meizhou Hakka	Free
25 January 2025	Wen Shuo	Shaanxi Union	Free agent	Free
25 January 2025	Wu Chengru	Shaanxi Union	Free agent	Free
25 January 2025	Xu Wu	Shaanxi Union	Free agent	Free
25 January 2025	Yang Hang	Shanghai Jiading Huilong	Guangxi Pingguo	Free
25 January 2025	Zhang Hui	Unattached	Guangxi Pingguo	Free
25 January 2025	Zhang Zhixiong	Guangzhou	Chongqing Tonglianglong	Free
25 January 2025	Zheng Kaimu	Cangzhou Mighty Lions	Wuhan Three Towns	Free
25 January 2025	Zhong Haoran	Yunnan Yukun	Meizhou Hakka	Free
26 January 2025	Chen Quanjiang	Guangzhou	Guangxi Pingguo	Free
26 January 2025	Dong Hang	Cangzhou Mighty Lions	Qingdao West Coast	Free
26 January 2025	Gao Di	Zhejiang	Qingdao West Coast	Free
26 January 2025	Ge Hailun	Dalian K'un City	Guangxi Pingguo	Free
26 January 2025	Gong Qiule	Foshan Nanshi	Free agent	Free
26 January 2025	He Xiaoke	Shandong Taishan	Qingdao West Coast	Free
26 January 2025	John Hou Sæter	(Norway) Ranheim	Yunnan Yukun	Undisclosed
26 January 2025	Huang Qijia	Foshan Nanshi	Free agent	Free
26 January 2025	Huang Yushen	Foshan Nanshi	Free agent	Free
26 January 2025	Jin Jian	Yantai Ruixiang	Guangxi Pingguo	Free
26 January 2025	Li Canming	Foshan Nanshi	Free agent	Free
26 January 2025	Li Hao	(Spain) Cornellà	Qingdao West Coast	Undisclosed
26 January 2025	Liu Langzhou	Guangzhou	Qingdao West Coast	Free
26 January 2025	Long Wei	Qingdao Hainiu	Wuhan Three Towns	Free
26 January 2025	Lu Chenghe	Lanzhou Longyuan Athletic	Guangxi Pingguo	Free
26 January 2025	Ning An	Guangdong GZ-Power	Guangxi Pingguo	Free
26 January 2025	(United States) Sun Delin	Foshan Nanshi	Free agent	Free
26 January 2025	Wang Hanyi	Shanghai Shenhua	Qingdao West Coast	Undisclosed
26 January 2025	Wang Jiancong	Guangxi Bushan	Guangxi Pingguo	Free
26 January 2025	Wang Jie	Guangzhou	Chongqing Tonglianglong	Free
26 January 2025	Wang Peng	Cangzhou Mighty Lions	Qingdao West Coast	Free
26 January 2025	Wei Lai	Nantong Zhiyun	Dalian K'un City	Free
26 January 2025	(Chinese Taipei) Wu Yen-shu	Jiangxi Dingnan United	Dalian K'un City	Free
26 January 2025	Wu Yongqiang	Guangzhou	Chongqing Tonglianglong	Free
26 January 2025	Wu Zitong	Guangzhou	Chongqing Tonglianglong	Free
26 January 2025	Xiang Rongjun	Shanghai Port	Qingdao West Coast	Undisclosed
26 January 2025	Xu Bin	Guangzhou	Qingdao West Coast	Free
26 January 2025	Álex Yang	(Spain) L'Hospitalet	Qingdao West Coast	Undisclosed
26 January 2025	Yang Fan	Chengdu Rongcheng	Tianjin Jinmen Tiger	Free
26 January 2025	Ye Zimin	Foshan Nanshi	Free agent	Free
26 January 2025	Zhang Chengdong	Beijing Guoan	Qingdao West Coast	Free
26 January 2025	Zhong Jinbao	Qingdao Hainiu	Wuhan Three Towns	Free
27 January 2025	Abduwahap Aniwar	Guangzhou	Shaanxi Union	Free
27 January 2025	Afrden Asqer	Guangzhou	Shanghai Port	Free
27 January 2025	Chen Zhechao	Meizhou Hakka	Wuhan Three Towns	Free
27 January 2025	(Brazil) Dominic Vinicius	Shanghai Jiading Huilong	(South Korea) Hwaseong	Free
27 January 2025	(Brazil) Erikys	Shijiazhuang Gongfu	Free agent	Free
27 January 2025	(Canada) Aidan Fong	(United States) Green Bay Phoenix	Liaoning Tieren	Free
27 January 2025	Fu Shang	Shijiazhuang Gongfu	Guangxi Pingguo	Free
27 January 2025	(Brazil) Gabrielzinho	(Portugal) Moreirense	Shanghai Port	Loan
27 January 2025	Han Zhen	Jiangxi Lushan	Guangxi Pingguo	Free
27 January 2025	He Zhenyu	Changchun Yatai	Free agent	Free
27 January 2025	Jiang Zhengjie	Guangxi Lanhang	Guangxi Pingguo	Free
27 January 2025	(Slovenia) Andrej Kotnik	Meizhou Hakka	Dalian K'un City	Free
27 January 2025	(Brazil) Leonardo	Shandong Taishan	Shanghai Port	Undisclosed
27 January 2025	Li Yingkai	Shandong Taishan	Chongqing Tonglianglong	Undisclosed
27 January 2025	Liu Ruofan	Wuhan Three Towns	Shanghai Port	Free
27 January 2025	Ma Shuai	Shijiazhuang Gongfu	Free agent	Free
27 January 2025	Ming Tian	Tianjin Jinmen Tiger	Shanghai Port	Free
27 January 2025	Shi Liang	Meizhou Hakka	Foshan Nanshi	Free
27 January 2025	(Brazil) Mateus Vital	(Brazil) Cruzeiro	Shanghai Port	Undisclosed
27 January 2025	Wang Haochen	Shijiazhuang Gongfu	Free agent	Free
27 January 2025	Wang Junyang	Guangzhou	Shaanxi Union	Free
27 January 2025	Wang Shijie	Guangzhou	Shaanxi Union	Free
27 January 2025	Wei Guoren	Guangzhou	Guangxi Pingguo	Free
27 January 2025	Xu Jianhao	Wuhan Xiaoma	Guangxi Pingguo	Free
27 January 2025	Zhang Ran	Foshan Nanshi	Guangxi Pingguo	Free
27 January 2025	Zheng Haoqian	Nantong Zhiyun	Wuhan Three Towns	Free
28 January 2025	(France) Wylan Cyprien	(Italy) Parma	Changchun Yatai	Undisclosed
28 January 2025	(Brazil) Lucas Gazal	(Brazil) Atlético Goianiense	Shandong Taishan	Loan
28 January 2025	(Brazil) Guilherme Madruga	(Brazil) Cuiabá	Shandong Taishan	Undisclosed
28 January 2025	Piao Taoyu	Qingdao West Coast	Changchun Yatai	Free
28 January 2025	Sun Qinhan	Cangzhou Mighty Lions	Changchun Yatai	Free
28 January 2025	Sun Xiaobin	Shaanxi Union	Foshan Nanshi	Free
28 January 2025	(Romania) Alexandru Tudorie	(Romania) Petrolul Ploiești	Wuhan Three Towns	Undisclosed
28 January 2025	Xu Haofeng	Henan	Changchun Yatai	Loan
28 January 2025	Xu Yue	Shijiazhuang Gongfu	Changchun Yatai	Free
28 January 2025	Yao Xuchen	Cangzhou Mighty Lions	Changchun Yatai	Free
28 January 2025	(Hong Kong) Yu Wai Lim	Wuxi Wugo	(Hong Kong) Lee Man	Free
28 January 2025	Zhao Yingjie	Cangzhou Mighty Lions	Changchun Yatai	Free
28 January 2025	Zhou Junchen	Shanghai Shenhua	Changchun Yatai	Loan
30 January 2025	(Gabon) Aaron Boupendza	(Romania) Rapid București	Zhejiang	€800,000
30 January 2025	Wang Bohao	Yanbian Longding	Shaanxi Union	Free
30 January 2025	Wu Shaocong	(Turkey) İstanbul Başakşehir	Beijing Guoan	Undisclosed
31 January 2025	(Brazil) Felippe Cardoso	(Russia) Akhmat Grozny	Henan	Loan
31 January 2025	(Hong Kong) Wong Ho Chun	(Hong Kong) Eastern	Qingdao Hainiu	Undisclosed
31 January 2025	Xu Chunqing	Suzhou Dongwu	Wuxi Wugo	Free
31 January 2025	(Kazakhstan) Georgy Zhukov	Cangzhou Mighty Lions	(Poland) Puszcza Niepołomice	Free
1 February 2025	Che Shiwei	Foshan Nanshi	Qingdao Hainiu	Free
1 February 2025	(Australia) Alex Grant	Tianjin Jinmen Tiger	(Australia) Sydney	Free
1 February 2025	(Zambia) Evans Kangwa	Qingdao Hainiu	(Saudi Arabia) Abha	Free
1 February 2025	Li Xiancheng	Nantong Haimen Codion	(Germany) Viktoria Berlin	Free
1 February 2025	Shang Kefeng	Suzhou Dongwu	Wuxi Wugo	Free
1 February 2025	Wang Bowen	Nantong Haimen Codion	(Germany) Viktoria Berlin	Free
2 February 2025	(Nigeria) Akinkunmi Amoo	Unattached	Shanghai Jiading Huilong	Free
2 February 2025	(Brazil) Dawhan	(Japan) Gamba Osaka	Beijing Guoan	Undisclosed
2 February 2025	Li Ruiyue	Shanghai Jiading Huilong	Beijing Guoan	Undisclosed
2 February 2025	(Brazil) Serginho	Changchun Yatai	Beijing Guoan	Undisclosed
2 February 2025	Xiao Kun	Chongqing Tonglianglong	Qingdao Hainiu	Free
3 February 2025	(Netherlands) Rayan El Azrak	(Italy) Triestina	Shaanxi Union	Loan
3 February 2025	Wei Suowei	Guangzhou	Qingdao Hainiu	Free
4 February 2025	(England) Ashley Coffey	(Finland) Oulu	Shanghai Jiading Huilong	Free
4 February 2025	Geng Xiaofeng	Chengdu Rongcheng	Yunnan Yukun	Free
4 February 2025	(Netherlands) Hector Hevel	Guangxi Pingguo	(Portugal) Portimonense	Free
4 February 2025	(Brazil) Diego Lopes	Qingdao Hainiu	Free agent	Free
4 February 2025	Ma Xingyu	Qingdao Hainiu	Free agent	Free
4 February 2025	(Republic of Ireland) Jimmy Mwanga	Qingdao Red Lions	(Austria) Vorwärts Steyr	Free
4 February 2025	Yang Yiming	Chengdu Rongcheng	Shenzhen Peng City	Free
5 February 2025	(Cameroon) Messi Bouli	Shijiazhuang Gongfu	(India) East Bengal	Free
5 February 2025	Hu Haoyue	Suzhou Dongwu	Free agent	Free
5 February 2025	(Portugal) Joca	Wuhan Three Towns	(Turkey) Gençlerbirliği	Free
5 February 2025	Liu Shiming	Liaoning Tieren	(Spain) Requena	Free
6 February 2025	Zanhar Besathan	Qingdao Red Lions	Suzhou Dongwu	Free
6 February 2025	(Italy) Andrea Compagno	Tianjin Jinmen Tiger	(South Korea) Jeonbuk Hyundai Motors	Free
6 February 2025	Dai Bowei	Qingdao Red Lions	Nantong Zhiyun	Free
6 February 2025	Hu Jing	Chongqing Tonglianglong	Suzhou Dongwu	Free
6 February 2025	Hu Mingfei	Guangxi Pingguo	Nantong Zhiyun	Free
6 February 2025	Jiang Zhixin	Shanghai Shenhua	Suzhou Dongwu	Free
6 February 2025	Li Haoran	Shanghai Port	Nantong Zhiyun	Loan
6 February 2025	Ular Muhtar	Guizhou Zhucheng Athletic	Wuxi Wugo	Free
6 February 2025	Ruan Yang	Shenzhen Peng City	Tianjin Jinmen Tiger	Free
6 February 2025	(England) Viv Solomon-Otabor	Cangzhou Mighty Lions	(United Arab Emirates) Al Orooba	Free
6 February 2025	Wang Jinshuai	Henan	Nantong Zhiyun	Loan
6 February 2025	Wen Junjie	Foshan Nanshi	Suzhou Dongwu	Free
6 February 2025	Wu Junjie	Guangzhou	Suzhou Dongwu	Free
6 February 2025	Wu Linfeng	Jiangxi Lushan	Wuxi Wugo	Free
6 February 2025	Xie Xiaofan	Quanzhou Yassin	Wuxi Wugo	Free
6 February 2025	(South Korea) Xu Hui	Jiangxi Dingnan United	Nantong Zhiyun	Free
6 February 2025	Zhu Yue	Shanghai Shenhua	Suzhou Dongwu	Loan
7 February 2025	(Serbia) Aleksandar Andrejević	Chongqing Tonglianglong	Suzhou Dongwu	Free
7 February 2025	(Guinea-Bissau) Romário Baldé	Wuhan Three Towns	(South Korea) Gangwon	Free
7 February 2025	(Lesotho) Thabiso Brown	Jiangxi Lushan	(India) Gokulam Kerala	Free
7 February 2025	(Serbia) Nemanja Čović	Henan	Suzhou Dongwu	Free
7 February 2025	(Serbia) Milan Marčić	(Serbia) Tekstilac Odžaci	Shenzhen Juniors	Free
7 February 2025	(Peru) Santiago Ormeño	(Mexico) Guadalajara	Qingdao Hainiu	Free
7 February 2025	Xu Dongdong	Jiangxi Lushan	Shaanxi Union	Free
7 February 2025	Zu Pengchao	Hunan Billows	Shenzhen Juniors	Free
8 February 2025	(Montenegro) Nebojša Kosović	Meizhou Hakka	(Saudi Arabia) Al-Tai	Free
8 February 2025	(Chinese Taipei) Yaki Yen	Chongqing Tonglianglong	(Spain) Club Deportivo El Cotillo	Free
9 February 2025	Chen Liming	Guangdong GZ-Power	Free agent	Free
9 February 2025	Jin Qiang	Guangdong GZ-Power	Free agent	Free
9 February 2025	Lin Huahuan	Guangdong GZ-Power	Free agent	Free
9 February 2025	Ling Chuanbin	Guangdong GZ-Power	Free agent	Free
9 February 2025	Liu Jiqiang	Guangdong GZ-Power	Free agent	Free
9 February 2025	Lü Haidong	Guangdong GZ-Power	Free agent	Free
9 February 2025	(England) Joel Nouble	Wuxi Wugo	Shenzhen Juniors	Free
9 February 2025	(Brazil) Rivaldinho	(Romania) Farul Constanța	Qingdao Red Lions	Undisclosed
9 February 2025	(Brazil) Gustavo Sauer	(Brazil) Botafogo	Wuhan Three Towns	Free
9 February 2025	Shi Letian	Guangdong GZ-Power	Free agent	Free
9 February 2025	Tang Tianyi	Guangdong GZ-Power	Free agent	Free
9 February 2025	Xu Jiajun	Guangdong GZ-Power	Free agent	Free
9 February 2025	Zhang Hongjiang	Guangdong GZ-Power	Free agent	Free
9 February 2025	Zhang Jinliang	Guangdong GZ-Power	Free agent	Free
10 February 2025	(Brazil) Davidson	(Turkey) İstanbul Başakşehir	Qingdao West Coast	Undisclosed
10 February 2025	Du Changjie	Shanxi Chongde Ronghai	Shanghai Jiading Huilong	Free
10 February 2025	(Brazil) Diogo Silva	Tianjin Jinmen Tiger	(Brazil) Noroeste	Free
10 February 2025	Wang Haoran	Henan	Shanghai Jiading Huilong	Loan
10 February 2025	Wu Guichao	Guangxi Hengchen	Guangxi Pingguo	Free
11 February 2025	Leng Jixuan	Ganzhou Ruishi	Shaanxi Union	Free
11 February 2025	Nan Xiaoheng	Nanjing City	Nantong Zhiyun	Free
11 February 2025	(Spain) Juan Antonio Ros	(Spain) Albacete	Tianjin Jinmen Tiger	Free
11 February 2025	Ye Chongqiu	Guangxi Pingguo	Guangxi Union	Free
12 February 2025	(Brazil) Leandro Alves	(Portugal) União Santarém	Qingdao Red Lions	Undisclosed
12 February 2025	Huang Xin	Guangxi Pingguo	Guangxi Union	Free
12 February 2025	(Montenegro) Staniša Mandić	Wuxi Wugo	(Montenegro) Arsenal Tivat	Free
12 February 2025	Tao Qianglong	Wuhan Three Towns	Zhejiang	Undisclosed
12 February 2025	Qeyser Tursun	Hunan Billows	Wuxi Wugo	Free
12 February 2025	Zhang Zijun	Henan	Wuxi Wugo	Free
13 February 2025	(Togo) Samuel Asamoah	Qingdao Red Lions	Guangxi Pingguo	Free
13 February 2025	Huo Shenping	Guangzhou	Zhejiang	¥2,400,000
13 February 2025	(Belgium) Aristote Nkaka	(Belgium) Lierse	Guangxi Pingguo	Free
13 February 2025	Shan Pengfei	Guangxi Pingguo	Guangdong GZ-Power	Free
13 February 2025	Zhang Yuanshu	Wuxi Wugo	Guangxi Union	Free
14 February 2025	(Uruguay) Nicolás Albarracín	(Peru) Mannucci	Foshan Nanshi	Free
14 February 2025	(Brazil) Filipe Augusto	(Brazil) Cuiabá	Qingdao Hainiu	Free
14 February 2025	Gao Mingyi	Jiangxi Lushan	Free agent	Free
14 February 2025	Kang Zhenjie	Jiangxi Lushan	Free agent	Free
14 February 2025	(Brazil) Mateus Lima	(Thailand) Sukhothai	Guangxi Pingguo	Free
14 February 2025	Liu Xinyu	Cangzhou Mighty Lions	Henan	Free
14 February 2025	Liu Zipeng	Jiangxi Lushan	Free agent	Free
14 February 2025	Ma Junliang	Foshan Nanshi	Guangdong GZ-Power	Free
14 February 2025	(Cameroon) John Mary	Meizhou Hakka	(Serbia) Novi Pazar	Free
14 February 2025	(Hong Kong) Raphaël Merkies	(Hong Kong) Southern	Shandong Taishan	Free
14 February 2025	Nan Yunqi	Shijiazhuang Gongfu	Guangxi Union	Free
14 February 2025	Shi Yucheng	Beijing Guoan	Shenzhen Juniors	Loan
14 February 2025	(Brazil) Willie	Jiangxi Lushan	Free agent	Free
14 February 2025	Xie Weichao	Jiangxi Lushan	Free agent	Free
14 February 2025	(Ghana) Abdul-Aziz Yakubu	(Japan) Shimizu S-Pulse	Qingdao West Coast	Loan
14 February 2025	Zhang Xiang	Jiangxi Lushan	Free agent	Free
15 February 2025	Chen Jie	Meizhou Hakka	Foshan Nanshi	Free
15 February 2025	Chen Yuhao	Wuhan Three Towns	Qingdao West Coast	Loan
15 February 2025	Chen Yunhua	Guangxi Pingguo	Jiangxi Lushan	Loan
15 February 2025	(Angola) Nelson da Luz	(Portugal) Vitória de Guimarães	Qingdao West Coast	Undisclosed
15 February 2025	Ding Haifeng	Tianjin Jinmen Tiger	Qingdao West Coast	Free
15 February 2025	Duan Liuyu	Shandong Taishan	Qingdao West Coast	Loan
15 February 2025	(Angola) Estrela	(Turkey) Boluspor	Suzhou Dongwu	Free
15 February 2025	Hao Yucheng	Beijing Guoan	Qingdao Red Lions	Loan
15 February 2025	He Longhai	Shanghai Shenhua	Qingdao West Coast	Free
15 February 2025	Jia Feifan	Shandong Taishan	Qingdao Hainiu	Loan
15 February 2025	Liu Xiaolong	Shanghai Port	Qingdao West Coast	Loan
15 February 2025	Liu Xiaoqi	Cangzhou Mighty Lions	Qingdao Red Lions	Free
15 February 2025	(Croatia) David Puclin	Nantong Zhiyun	(Hungary) Kisvárda	Free
15 February 2025	(Brazil) Riccieli	(Portugal) Famalicão	Qingdao West Coast	Loan
15 February 2025	Shan Huanhuan	Unattached	Qingdao West Coast	Free
15 February 2025	Sheng Muze	Shandong Taishan	Qingdao Red Lions	Loan
15 February 2025	Song Long	Shandong Taishan	Qingdao Hainiu	Loan
15 February 2025	Sun Jie	Changchun Yatai	Qingdao West Coast	Loan
15 February 2025	(Chinese Taipei) Wang Chien-ming	Qingdao Hainiu	Guangdong GZ-Power	Free
15 February 2025	Wang Shiqin	Chongqing Tonglianglong	Zhejiang	Free
15 February 2025	Zhang Yixuan	Beijing Guoan	Qingdao Red Lions	Loan
15 February 2025	Zhou Jianyi	Cangzhou Mighty Lions	Qingdao Red Lions	Free
16 February 2025	Liu Tao	Chengdu Rongcheng	Free agent	Free
16 February 2025	(Cameroon) Jerome Ngom Mbekeli	(Moldova) Sheriff Tiraspol	Meizhou Hakka	Free
16 February 2025	Tong Lei	Shandong Taishan	Zhejiang	¥3,500,000
16 February 2025	Wu Lei	Chengdu Rongcheng	Free agent	Free
16 February 2025	Yang Hao	Guangzhou	Guangdong GZ-Power	Free
17 February 2025	Chen Zhao	Nantong Zhiyun	Guangdong GZ-Power	Free
17 February 2025	Cui Zhongkai	Dalian Yingbo	Free agent	Free
17 February 2025	Li Chenguang	Hunan Billows	Jiangxi Lushan	Free
17 February 2025	Liang Shaowen	Beijing Guoan	Shaanxi Union	Undisclosed
17 February 2025	Luo Andong	Chongqing Tonglianglong	Jiangxi Lushan	Free
17 February 2025	(Brazil) Moresche	Nanjing City	(Cambodia) Svay Rieng	Free
17 February 2025	(Colombia) Manuel Palacios	Chengdu Rongcheng	Wuhan Three Towns	Free
17 February 2025	Weli Qurban	Guangzhou	Jiangxi Lushan	Free
17 February 2025	(Brazil) Róbson	Dalian Yingbo	Free agent	Free
17 February 2025	Wang Shixin	Dalian Yingbo	Free agent	Free
17 February 2025	Yan Yu	Beijing Guoan	Shaanxi Union	Undisclosed
17 February 2025	Yuan Hao	Dalian Yingbo	Free agent	Free
17 February 2025	Zhang Xiao	Guangxi Hengchen	Jiangxi Lushan	Free
17 February 2025	Zhang Zhen	Dalian Yingbo	Free agent	Free
17 February 2025	Zheng Zhenxian	Dalian Yingbo	Free agent	Free
18 February 2025	Merdanjan Abduklim	Qingdao West Coast	Free agent	Free
18 February 2025	Alan	Qingdao West Coast	Free agent	Free
18 February 2025	Chen Xuhuang	Shanghai Port	Meizhou Hakka	Loan
18 February 2025	(Cameroon) Michael Cheukoua	(Austria) Grazer AK	Meizhou Hakka	Free
18 February 2025	(Portugal) Pedro Delgado	Shandong Taishan	Chengdu Rongcheng	Loan
18 February 2025	Duan Yunzi	Liaoning Tieren	Guangdong GZ-Power	Free
18 February 2025	Han Pengfei	Tianjin Jinmen Tiger	Chengdu Rongcheng	Free
18 February 2025	He Guan	Shanghai Port	Wuhan Three Towns	Loan
18 February 2025	Ji Shengpan	Zhejiang	Meizhou Hakka	Free
18 February 2025	Jiang Weiyi	Beijing Guoan	Shenzhen Peng City	Free
18 February 2025	(Sierra Leone) Issa Kallon	Nantong Zhiyun	Chengdu Rongcheng	Undisclosed
18 February 2025	Li Shenyuan	Shanghai Port	Changchun Yatai	Free
18 February 2025	Li Zhen	Dalian Yingbo	Changchun Xidu	Free
18 February 2025	Liao Lisheng	Shandong Taishan	Chengdu Rongcheng	Free
18 February 2025	Ling Zhongyang	Heze Caozhou	Meizhou Hakka	Free
18 February 2025	Liu Baiyang	Shanghai Port	Qingdao West Coast	Loan
18 February 2025	Liu Dianzuo	Wuhan Three Towns	Chengdu Rongcheng	Free
18 February 2025	Liu Zhurun	Shanghai Port	Dalian Yingbo	Loan
18 February 2025	(Austria) Constantin Reiner	(Poland) Piast Gliwice	Shaanxi Union	Free
18 February 2025	Shen Huanming	Beijing Guoan	Shenzhen Peng City	Free
18 February 2025	(Serbia) Uroš Spajić	(Serbia) Red Star Belgrade	Beijing Guoan	Free
18 February 2025	Sun Jianxiang	Cangzhou Mighty Lions	Meizhou Hakka	Free
18 February 2025	Wang Dongsheng	Zhejiang	Chengdu Rongcheng	Free
18 February 2025	(Switzerland) Ming-yang Yang	Nantong Zhiyun	Chengdu Rongcheng	Undisclosed
18 February 2025	Yi Xianlong	Shandong Taishan	Meizhou Hakka	Free
18 February 2025	Yuan Mincheng	Changchun Yatai	Chengdu Rongcheng	Free
18 February 2025	Umidjan Yusup	Wuhan Three Towns	Shanghai Port	¥6,000,000
19 February 2025	Chen Binbin	Shanghai Port	Nantong Zhiyun	Free
19 February 2025	Deng Biao	Liaoning Tieren	Guangdong GZ-Power	Free
19 February 2025	Liu Pujin	Qingdao West Coast	Qingdao Red Lions	Free
19 February 2025	Lü Kaiwen	Guangxi Pingguo	Qingdao Red Lions	Free
19 February 2025	Song Runtong	Henan	Qingdao Red Lions	Free
19 February 2025	Sun Xipeng	Chongqing Tonglianglong	Qingdao Red Lions	Free
19 February 2025	Tan Kaiyuan	Qingdao West Coast	Shaanxi Union	Free
19 February 2025	(Serbia) Stefan Vukić	Chongqing Tonglianglong	(Russia) Sokol Saratov	Free
19 February 2025	Zhao Chengle	Jiangxi Dingnan United	Qingdao Red Lions	Free
20 February 2025	Cao Xiaoyi	Wuhan Lianzhen	Qingdao Red Lions	Free
20 February 2025	Chen Guoliang	Chengdu Rongcheng	Guangdong GZ-Power	Free
20 February 2025	Fei Ernanduo	Shanghai Shenhua	Guangxi Hengchen	Free
20 February 2025	Hua Mingcan	Henan	Foshan Nanshi	Loan
20 February 2025	Huang Ming	Shanghai Shenhua	Shanghai Jiading Huilong	Loan
20 February 2025	Bughrahan Iskandar	Chengdu Rongcheng	Qingdao Red Lions	Free
20 February 2025	Jiang Zhixin	Shanghai Shenhua	Suzhou Dongwu	Loan
20 February 2025	Li Yanan	Yanbian Longding	Qingdao Red Lions	Free
20 February 2025	Liu Zongyuan	Henan	Foshan Nanshi	Loan
20 February 2025	(Canada) Ryan Raposo	(Canada) Vancouver Whitecaps FC	Liaoning Tieren	Free
20 February 2025	Shi Zhe	Yunnan Yukun	Qingdao Red Lions	Free
20 February 2025	Wang Yifan	Shanghai Shenhua	Suzhou Dongwu	Loan
20 February 2025	Zhang Zhihao	Henan	Foshan Nanshi	Loan
20 February 2025	Zheng Junwei	Henan	Foshan Nanshi	Loan
20 February 2025	Zhu Qiwen	Shanghai Shenhua	Nanjing City	Loan
21 February 2025	Cen Liyi	Guangxi Bushan	Guangxi Hengchen	Free
21 February 2025	Chen Junxu	Jiangxi Lushan	Shaanxi Union	Free
21 February 2025	Cui Xinglong	Foshan Nanshi	Guangdong GZ-Power	Free
21 February 2025	Li Chen	Beijing Guoan	Shaanxi Union	Free
21 February 2025	Li Ruifeng	Kunming City	Shanghai Jiading Huilong	Free
21 February 2025	Liu Shilong	Unattached	Shanghai Jiading Huilong	Free
21 February 2025	Liu Weicheng	Qingdao Hainiu	Nantong Zhiyun	Free
21 February 2025	(Portugal) João Nóbrega	(Georgia (country)) Dila Gori	Qingdao Red Lions	Free
21 February 2025	Wang Tianqing	Jiangxi Dark Horse Junior	Guangxi Hengchen	Free
21 February 2025	Yao Zixuan	Jiangxi Lushan	Guangxi Hengchen	Free
21 February 2025	Zhang Jingyi	Wuxi Wugo	Shanghai Jiading Huilong	Free
21 February 2025	Zhang Zijian	Jiangsu Landhouse Dong Victory	Guangxi Hengchen	Free
22 February 2025	Yan Zihao	Cangzhou Mighty Lions	Guangdong GZ-Power	Free
23 February 2025	Huang Ming	Shanghai Shenhua	Shanghai Jiading Huilong	Loan
23 February 2025	Li Diantong	Quanzhou Yassin	Shanxi Chongde Ronghai	Free
23 February 2025	Qi Tianyu	Shandong Taishan	Shanghai Jiading Huilong	Loan
23 February 2025	(Brazil) Farley Rosa	Nantong Zhiyun	Guangdong GZ-Power	Free
23 February 2025	Xu Junchi	Zhejiang	Shijiazhuang Gongfu	Loan
23 February 2025	Zhang Ao	Qianxinan Xufengtang	Shanxi Chongde Ronghai	Free
24 February 2025	Askhan	Guangzhou	Suzhou Dongwu	Free
24 February 2025	Bai Shuo	Hunan Billows	Shanxi Chongde Ronghai	Free
24 February 2025	Bao Shimeng	Shanghai Port	Suzhou Dongwu	Loan
24 February 2025	(France) Jean-David Beauguel	Qingdao West Coast	(Poland) Stal Mielec	Free
24 February 2025	Chen Ao	Qingdao West Coast	Suzhou Dongwu	Free
24 February 2025	Fan Xulin	Hubei Istar	Suzhou Dongwu	Loan
24 February 2025	Gao Huaze	Tianjin Jinmen Tiger	Shijiazhuang Gongfu	Free
24 February 2025	Gao Yixuan	Qingdao Hainiu	Guangxi Hengchen	Loan
24 February 2025	Huang Yonghai	Shanghai Port	Guangxi Hengchen	Loan
24 February 2025	Li Xiaohan	Jiangsu Landhouse Dong Victory	Shanxi Chongde Ronghai	Free
24 February 2025	(Brazil) Nikão	(Brazil) São Paulo	Guangdong GZ-Power	Free
24 February 2025	Shi Jiwei	Chongqing Tonglianglong	Jiangxi Lushan	Free
24 February 2025	Song Yi	Zibo Home	Jiangxi Lushan	Free
24 February 2025	Sun Yue	Lanzhou Longyuan Athletic	Jiangxi Lushan	Free
24 February 2025	Wen Yongjun	Shenzhen Juniors	Guangdong Mingtu	Loan
24 February 2025	Yuan Junjie	Shenzhen Peng City	Suzhou Dongwu	Loan
24 February 2025	Zheng Zhiming	Shenzhen Juniors	Guangdong Mingtu	Loan
25 February 2025	Emirulla Abdusemet	Wuhan Three Towns	Guangdong Mingtu	Free
25 February 2025	Chen Dongtao	Wuhan Lianzhen	Guangxi Hengchen	Free
25 February 2025	Gong Hankui	Nanjing City	Wuxi Wugo	Free
25 February 2025	Jiang Feng	Liaoning Tieren	Shanxi Chongde Ronghai	Free
25 February 2025	Li Guanxi	Shandong Taishan	Nantong Zhiyun	Free
25 February 2025	Li Zhongting	Pingluo Hengli	Shanxi Chongde Ronghai	Free
25 February 2025	(France) Chris Ondong Mba	(Malta) Hamrun Spartans	Yanbian Longding	Free
25 February 2025	Pang Jiajun	Jiangxi Dark Horse Junior	Guangdong Mingtu	Free
25 February 2025	Wang Jingbin	Guangxi Pingguo	Shijiazhuang Gongfu	Free
25 February 2025	Yu Haozhen	Henan	Shanghai Jiading Huilong	Free
25 February 2025	Zhang Huajun	Guangxi Pingguo	Guangxi Hengchen	Free
26 February 2025	Chen Zhexuan	Shandong Taishan	Shijiazhuang Gongfu	Free
26 February 2025	(Algeria) Oussama Darfalou	Unattached	Shaanxi Union	Free
26 February 2025	Gan Xianhao	Shenzhen Juniors	Beijing IT	Loan
26 February 2025	Huang Kaijun	Hubei Istar	Shenzhen Juniors	Loan
26 February 2025	(Brazil) João Carlos	Liaoning Tieren	Guangdong GZ-Power	Free
26 February 2025	Lin Feiyang	Hubei Istar	Shenzhen Juniors	Loan
26 February 2025	Ning Weichen	Zibo Home	Guangxi Hengchen	Free
26 February 2025	(Serbia) Aleksandar Paločević	(South Korea) Seoul	Nantong Zhiyun	Loan
26 February 2025	Wang Jiakun	Shenzhen Juniors	Beijing IT	Loan
26 February 2025	Wang Wenxuan	Guangzhou	Chongqing Tonglianglong	Free
27 February 2025	An Bang	Guangzhou	Nanjing City	Free
27 February 2025	Chen Xiangyu	Qingdao West Coast	Nantong Zhiyun	Free
27 February 2025	Chen Xiangyu	Nantong Zhiyun	Guizhou Zhucheng Athletic	Loan
27 February 2025	Deng Jiajie	Henan	Shijiazhuang Gongfu	Free
27 February 2025	Dong Kaining	Jiangsu Landhouse Dong Victory	Wuxi Wugo	Free
27 February 2025	Du Junpeng	Qingdao West Coast	Nanjing City	Free
27 February 2025	Fu Yuncheng	Dalian Yingbo	Nanjing City	Free
27 February 2025	Guo Jincheng	Changchun Yatai	Yulin Mobei Miners	Free
27 February 2025	Han Kunda	Guangzhou	Nanjing City	Free
27 February 2025	Ji Xiang	Shandong Taishan	Nanjing City	Loan
27 February 2025	Jiang Jihong	Yunnan Yukun	Guangdong GZ-Power	Free
27 February 2025	Li Guangwen	Yunnan Yukun	Nanjing City	Free
27 February 2025	Lü Jiaqiang	Shenzhen 2028	Wuxi Wugo	Loan
27 February 2025	Luo Hanbowen	Nantong Haimen Codion	Wuxi Wugo	Free
27 February 2025	Peng Jiahao	Guangzhou	Guangdong Mingtu	Free
27 February 2025	Ren Yiqiu	Shenzhen 2028	Guangdong Mingtu	Free
27 February 2025	Wang Junhao	Changchun Xidu	Nanjing City	Free
27 February 2025	Yang Dejiang	Guangzhou	Nanjing City	Free
27 February 2025	Yang Zexuan	Shanxi Chongde Ronghai	Yulin Mobei Miners	Free
27 February 2025	Yang Zhaohui	Tai'an Tiankuang	Shijiazhuang Gongfu	Free
27 February 2025	Yu Bohan	Cangzhou Mighty Lions	Shijiazhuang Gongfu	Free
27 February 2025	Zhang Aokai	Yanbian Longding	Yulin Mobei Miners	Free
27 February 2025	Zhang Jianzhi	Yunnan Yukun	Nanjing City	Free
27 February 2025	Zhao Wenzhe	Jiangxi Dark Horse Junior	Nanjing City	Free
27 February 2025	Zhao Ziye	Guangxi Pingguo	Shijiazhuang Gongfu	Free
27 February 2025	Zhong Weihong	Shaanxi Union	Wuxi Wugo	Loan
27 February 2025	Zhou Yu	Qinghai Xining Kunlun	Wuxi Wugo	Free
28 February 2025	Sabit Abdusalam	Changchun Yatai	Jiangxi Lushan	Free
28 February 2025	(Hong Kong) Clement Benhaddouche	Suzhou Dongwu	(Hong Kong) Eastern	Free
28 February 2025	(Spain) José Ángel Carrillo	(Spain) Real Murcia	Chongqing Tonglianglong	Free
28 February 2025	(Chinese Taipei) Chen Hao-wei	Unattached	Qingdao Red Lions	Free
28 February 2025	Ding Yunfeng	Qinghai Xining Kunlun	Nanjing City	Free
28 February 2025	Dong Xin	Qinghai Xining Kunlun	Nanjing City	Free
28 February 2025	Feng Yifan	Guangzhou	Guangxi Hengchen	Free
28 February 2025	Gao Yunpeng	Henan	Yanbian Longding	Loan
28 February 2025	Guo Yi	Guangxi Pingguo	Nanjing City	Free
28 February 2025	Hou Yu	Guangzhou	Guangdong GZ-Power	Free
28 February 2025	Hu Rentian	Guangxi Pingguo	Nanjing City	Free
28 February 2025	Huang Zhenfei	Qinghai Xining Kunlun	Yanbian Longding	Free
28 February 2025	(Bosnia and Herzegovina) Tarik Isić	(Bosnia and Herzegovina) Sloboda Tuzla	Nanjing City	Free
28 February 2025	Kou Jiahao	Guizhou Zhucheng Athletic	Yanbian Longding	Free
28 February 2025	Li Chen	Shaanxi Union	Jiangxi Lushan	Free
28 February 2025	Li Mingfan	Wuhan Three Towns	Nanjing City	Free
28 February 2025	Li Shengmin	Hubei Istar	Yanbian Longding	Loan
28 February 2025	Liu Yufu	Foshan Nanshi	Shijiazhuang Gongfu	Free
28 February 2025	Lu Zhiyuan	Henan	Yanbian Longding	Loan
28 February 2025	(Portugal) Jucie Lupeta	(South Korea) Bucheon	Nanjing City	Free
28 February 2025	Miao Jiawei	Changchun Xidu	Nanjing City	Free
28 February 2025	Sun Yunlong	Yulin Tianzhijiaozi	Jiangxi Lushan	Free
28 February 2025	Tao Yuan	Shenzhen Peng City	Qingdao Red Lions	Free
28 February 2025	Wang Hao	Nanjing City	Free agent	Free
28 February 2025	Wang Xibo	Guangxi Lanhang	Jiangxi Lushan	Free
28 February 2025	Xiao Junlong	Tianjin Jinmen Tiger	Shijiazhuang Gongfu	Free
28 February 2025	Xu Jiashi	Kunming City	Shijiazhuang Gongfu	Free
28 February 2025	Xu Lei	Shanxi TYUT Yida	Jiangxi Lushan	Free
28 February 2025	Xu Yougang	Shanghai Shenhua	Jiangxi Lushan	Free
28 February 2025	Xu Zhaoji	Shanxi Chongde Ronghai	Jiangxi Lushan	Free
28 February 2025	Zhang Hui	Wuhan Three Towns	Nanjing City	Loan
28 February 2025	Zhang Xianbing	Qinghai Xining Kunlun	Nanjing City	Free
28 February 2025	Zhang Yu	Nanjing City	Free agent	Free
28 February 2025	Zhou Ziheng	Ganzhou Ruishi	Guizhou Zhucheng Athletic	Free
28 February 2025	Zhu Baojie	Shenzhen Peng City	Shanghai Jiading Huilong	Free
28 February 2025	Zhu Guantao	Zhejiang	Shenzhen Juniors	Free
1 March 2025	Feruk Ablimit	Dalian K'un City	Shanxi Chongde Ronghai	Free
1 March 2025	Hou Yuyang	Shanghai Shenhua	Guizhou Zhucheng Athletic	Free
1 March 2025	Ares Murathan	Unattached	Guizhou Zhucheng Athletic	Free
1 March 2025	Wang Hanlin	Yulin Tianzhijiaozi	Shanxi Chongde Ronghai	Free
2 March 2025	Bai Xuyao	Shanghai Tongji	Shanxi Chongde Ronghai	Free
2 March 2025	Tan Tiancheng	Zibo Home	Shanxi Chongde Ronghai	Free
3 March 2025	Liu Tianyang	Quanzhou Yassin	Shanxi Chongde Ronghai	Free
3 March 2025	Zhang Donghai	(Spain) Rubí	Guangxi Hengchen	Free
3 March 2025	Zheng Yiming	Guangxi Hengchen	Shanxi Chongde Ronghai	Free
5 March 2025	Hu Jiaqi	Jiangxi Lushan	Wuxi Wugo	Free
5 March 2025	Huang Cong	Guizhou Zhucheng Athletic	Shanxi Chongde Ronghai	Free
5 March 2025	Huang Kaizhou	Qinghai Xining Kunlun	Shanxi Chongde Ronghai	Free
5 March 2025	Jin Haoxiang	Zhejiang	Hangzhou Linping Wuyue	Free
5 March 2025	Li Zhizhao	Shenzhen Peng City	Wuxi Wugo	Free
5 March 2025	Lu Yaohui	Hunan Billows	Wuxi Wugo	Free
5 March 2025	Tang Kaiqi	Zhejiang	Hangzhou Linping Wuyue	Free
5 March 2025	Wang Linjie	Zhejiang	Hangzhou Linping Wuyue	Free
5 March 2025	Wang Xiaofeng	Shanghai Jiading Huilong	Hangzhou Linping Wuyue	Free
5 March 2025	Wang Yuchen	Zhejiang	Hangzhou Linping Wuyue	Free
5 March 2025	Wu Yuhang	Zhejiang	Hangzhou Linping Wuyue	Free
5 March 2025	Xu Yike	Zhejiang	Hangzhou Linping Wuyue	Free
5 March 2025	Yin Jie	Quanzhou Yassin	Hangzhou Linping Wuyue	Free
5 March 2025	Ying Yuxiao	Lanzhou Longyuan Athletic	Hangzhou Linping Wuyue	Free
5 March 2025	Zhou Jinlong	Zhejiang	Hangzhou Linping Wuyue	Free
6 March 2025	Chen Yangle	Liaoning Tieren	Hangzhou Linping Wuyue	Loan
6 March 2025	Gao Tianyu	Zhejiang	Hangzhou Linping Wuyue	Loan
6 March 2025	He Tongshuai	Wuhan Three Towns	Hangzhou Linping Wuyue	Free
6 March 2025	Ilhamjan Iminjan	Shenzhen Jixiang	Shanxi Chongde Ronghai	Free
6 March 2025	Li Yuchen	Yunnan Jin Dal Lae	Jiangxi Lushan	Free
6 March 2025	Liu Guobo	Shandong Taishan	Jiangxi Lushan	Loan
6 March 2025	(Brazil) Marcel Scalese	Shandong Taishan	(Japan) Ehime	Free
6 March 2025	Teng Hui	Qingdao Hainiu	Shanxi Chongde Ronghai	Free
7 March 2025	Dong Huayang	Zhejiang	Tai'an Tiankuang	Free
7 March 2025	Ababekri Erkin	Shanghai Jiading Huilong	Changchun Xidu	Free
7 March 2025	Akzhol Erkin	Jinan Quansheng United	Tai'an Tiankuang	Free
7 March 2025	Fan Weixiang	Nanjing Yushen	Tai'an Tiankuang	Free
7 March 2025	Feng Qiaofeng	Hangzhou Qiantang	Hangzhou Linping Wuyue	Free
7 March 2025	Gao Hanfei	Wuxi Wugo	Free agent	Free
7 March 2025	Gao Jingchun	Shandong Taishan	Wuxi Wugo	Free
7 March 2025	Gui Hong	Wuxi Wugo	Free agent	Free
7 March 2025	Guo Song	Wuxi Wugo	Free agent	Free
7 March 2025	Hai Xiaorui	Qingdao Red Lions	Tai'an Tiankuang	Loan
7 March 2025	Huang Yikai	Ganzhou Ruishi	Guangdong Mingtu	Free
7 March 2025	Huang Yuxuan	Wuxi Wugo	Free agent	Free
7 March 2025	Lai Jiancheng	Shanghai MHI KLions	Tai'an Tiankuang	Free
7 March 2025	Li Guihao	Qingdao Red Lions	Changchun Xidu	Free
7 March 2025	Li Yi	Wuxi Wugo	Free agent	Free
7 March 2025	Liang Chaoshi	Guangxi Hengchen	Wuxi Wugo	Free
7 March 2025	Liu Xin	Guangxi Bushan	Guangdong Mingtu	Free
7 March 2025	Lu Hongda	Dalian Yingbo	Tai'an Tiankuang	Free
7 March 2025	Ma Ruize	Beijing Guoan	Tai'an Tiankuang	Free
7 March 2025	Ma Yangyang	Shaanxi Union	Tai'an Tiankuang	Free
7 March 2025	Mao Ziyu	Unattached	Wuxi Wugo	Free
7 March 2025	Nihat Nihmat	Jiangxi Lushan	Tai'an Tiankuang	Free
7 March 2025	Qin Qiang	Hangzhou Qiantang	Hangzhou Linping Wuyue	Free
7 March 2025	Sheng Tian	Zhejiang	Tai'an Tiankuang	Free
7 March 2025	Rehmitulla Shohret	Wuxi Wugo	Free agent	Free
7 March 2025	Song Xintao	Wuxi Wugo	Free agent	Free
7 March 2025	Sun Enming	Nanjing City	Guizhou Zhucheng Athletic	Free
7 March 2025	Sun Yuxi	Unattached	Tai'an Tiankuang	Free
7 March 2025	Tan Fucheng	Hangzhou Linping Wuyue	Tai'an Tiankuang	Free
7 March 2025	Tang Qirun	Wuxi Wugo	Tai'an Tiankuang	Free
7 March 2025	Tian Xin	Unattached	Tai'an Tiankuang	Free
7 March 2025	Wang Jinze	Jiangxi Dark Horse Junior	Tai'an Tiankuang	Free
7 March 2025	Wu Fan	Hangzhou Qiantang	Hangzhou Linping Wuyue	Free
7 March 2025	Xiao Boyang	Wuxi Wugo	Free agent	Free
7 March 2025	Xu Haojunmeng	Shenzhen 2028	Tai'an Tiankuang	Loan
7 March 2025	Yang Shukai	Hangzhou Qiantang	Hangzhou Linping Wuyue	Free
7 March 2025	Yu Yi	Shanghai Port	Guizhou Zhucheng Athletic	Free
7 March 2025	Yuan Xiuqi	Zibo Home	Tai'an Tiankuang	Free
7 March 2025	Yue Zhilei	Wuxi Wugo	Tai'an Tiankuang	Free
7 March 2025	Zhang Guodong	Unattached	Tai'an Tiankuang	Free
7 March 2025	Zhang Xingliang	Tianjin Jinmen Tiger	Tai'an Tiankuang	Free
7 March 2025	Zhao Zhihao	Hangzhou Qiantang	Hangzhou Linping Wuyue	Free
7 March 2025	Zheng Xu	Tianjin Lner	Tai'an Tiankuang	Free
7 March 2025	Zhu Haiwei	Wuxi Wugo	Free agent	Free
7 March 2025	Zhuang Jiajie	Ganzhou Ruishi	Tai'an Tiankuang	Free

== See also ==
- 2025 Chinese Super League
- 2025 China League One
- 2025 China League Two
