= 2026 Chinese FA Cup =

CFA Cup

Tournament details
- Country: China
- Dates: 14 March – 6 December 2026
- Teams: 80

The 2026 Chinese Football Association Cup (Chinese: 2026中国足球协会杯) is the 28th edition of the Chinese FA Cup.

The defending champions are Chinese Super League side Beijing Guoan.

== Schedule ==
Round	Draw date	Match dates	Clubs remaining	Clubs involved	Winners from previous round	New entries this round	New entries notes
First round	4 March 2026	13–15 March 2026	80	32	none	32	29 amateur teams 3 2026 China League Two teams
Second round	4 March 2026	18–20 April 2026	64	32	16	16	16 2026 China League Two teams
Third round	4 March 2026	15–17 May 2026	48	32	16	16	16 2026 China League One teams
Fourth round	4 March 2026	19–21 June 2026	32	32	16	16	16 2026 Chinese Super League teams
Fifth round	25 June 2026	21–22 July 2026	16	16	16	none	
Quarter-finals	25 June 2026	1–2 September 2026	8	8	8	none	
Semi-finals	25 June 2026	1 November 2026; 20 November 2026	4	4	4	none	
Final	25 June 2026	6 December 2026	2	2	2	none	

== First round ==
The draw for the first round took place on 4 March 2026.

Number of teams per tier still in competition
Chinese Super League (Note: Chinese Super League teams joined the competition in the fourth round.)	China League One (Note: China League One teams joined the competition in the third round.)	China League Two	Amateur	Total
16 / 16	16 / 16	19 / 19	29 / 29	80 / 80

13 March 2026	Changle Jingangtui (A)	0–1	Qingdao Fuli (A)	Fuzhou
15:00 UTC+8	Fu Jiayi (yellow card) 38'; Wei Chengzhi (yellow card) 59'		Zhang Jiashuo (yellow card) 21' (yellow-red card) 42'; Liu Tianyu 35'; Sha Yibo (yellow card) 70'	Stadium: International Joint Institute of Tianjin University, Fuzhou Football Field; Attendance: 230; Referee: Guo Xiang

13 March 2026	Shanghai Imair (A)	6–0	Hainan Shuangyu (A)	Shanghai
18:30 UTC+8	Sodorhu 7'; Wang Jun 38'; Yan Jiahao 43'; Enwer 55', 62'; Li Yile 60'		Wu Shihao (yellow card) 68'; Su Xuan (yellow card) 90+1'	Stadium: Yuanshen Sports Centre Stadium; Attendance: 554; Referee: Li Huigang

13 March 2026	Huzhou Changxing (A)	1–4	Shanghai Second (3)	Huzhou
19:35 UTC+8	Wang Tong (yellow card) 34'; Shao Renzhe (yellow card) 70', (goal) 80'		Li Xin 21', 89'; He Shaolin 27' (pen.); Xu Lei (yellow card) 30', (goal) 55' (pen.); Bi Haoyang (yellow card) 44'; He Bizhen (yellow card) 70'	Stadium: Huzhou Olympic Sports Center Stadium; Attendance: 368; Referee: Ma Yunkun

13 March 2026	Yunnan Cuanhe (A)	3–1	Guangzhou Rockgoal (A)	Qujing
19:35 UTC+8	He Dongdong 17'; Zhang Zhichao 48'; He Xiaotian (yellow card) 83'; He Xin 90+3' (pen.)		You Peiming 45'; Li Weihao (yellow card) 88'	Stadium: Qujing Cultural and Sports Park Stadium; Attendance: 16,116; Referee: He Kai

13 March 2026	Chongqing Handa (A)	3–0	Shenzhen Xingjun (A)	Chongqing
19:35 UTC+8	Fang Xiongwei 23'; Zhao Hejing (yellow card) 41'; Deng Jiaxing 44'; Liang Guoqiao 78'		Zhou Guoxin (yellow card) 45+1'; Huang Junye (yellow card) 81'	Stadium: Chongqing Dazu Sports Centre Stadium; Attendance: 1,268; Referee: Yan Xu

13 March 2026	Guangdong Red Treasure (A)	5–0	Dongxing Greenery (A)	Guangzhou
20:00 UTC+8	Li Zhenyu 15', 57'; Lu Yifeng 73'; Chen Junjie 83'; Huang Zhijian 87'			Stadium: Huadu Stadium; Attendance: 818; Referee: Qin Xiaohan

14 March 2026	Xiamen Chengyi (A)	2–0	Beijing Smart Sky (A)	Xiamen
15:00 UTC+8	Jiang Zeyuan 1'; Xu Jiasen 27'; Hu Xingcan (yellow card) 45+3'; Lei Jiawei (yellow card) 83'; Tang Junbin (red card) 84'; Zhou Qi (yellow card) 90+3' (yellow-red card) 90+4'		Ma Teng (yellow card) 45+4'; Fu Jiahan (yellow card) 79'; Li Mengqi (yellow card) 90'; Liang Hao (yellow card) 90+3'	Stadium: Haicang Sports Centre Stadium; Attendance: 987; Referee: Yan Lifu

14 March 2026	Shanxi TYUT Changsheng (A)	1–3	Dalian Kewei (3)	Changzhi
15:00 UTC+8	Zhang Runkun (yellow card) 29'; Liu Kunyang (yellow card) 33'; Wang Ruixiang 87'		Chen Yongze 25'; Zhang Xianbing 36'; Ge Yuxiang 82'	Stadium: Tunliu Sports Center Stadium

14 March 2026	Yulin Mobei Miners (A)	6–1	Tianjin Kaiser (A)	Yulin
15:00 UTC+8	Muqamet 25', 64'; Chen Shu 32'; Yang Yun 38'; Chen Kun (yellow card) 52'; Guo Jincheng 87', 90+3'		Sun Nanbin 29'; Jin Jingmin (yellow card) 33'	Stadium: Yulin Sports Center Stadium; Attendance: 3,614; Referee: Li Pengda

14 March 2026	Guizhou Xufengtang (A)	1–0	Shanxi Xiangyu (A)	Xingyi
15:30 UTC+8	Bi Qilin (yellow card) 43'; Zheng Feng (yellow card) 58'; Enwer 63'		Han Baoxiang (yellow card) 58'; Jiang Junda (yellow card) 80'	Stadium: Xingyi Lutun Football Town Field No.1; Attendance: 823; Referee: Cui Yueqiang

14 March 2026	Wuchuan Youth (A)	2–2 (3–5 p)	Hubei Istar (3)	Zhanjiang
15:30 UTC+8	Li Yuheng 47', (yellow card) 86'; Wu Zhirong 90+3'		Gao Su 21', (yellow card) 26'; Chen Jiaqi (yellow card) 32'; Liu Mingyu (yellow card) 52'; Zhang Chengji (yellow card) 86'	Stadium: Zhanjiang Olympic Sports Center Stadium; Attendance: 9,678; Referee: Yi Jiajin
	Penalties
	Wu Zhirong (penalty scored); Li Canming (penalty scored); Lu Haolin (penalty scored); Wei Guoren (penalty missed)		Wen Jialong (penalty scored); Tang Xin (penalty scored); Wang Zheng (penalty scored); Yu Guizhe (penalty scored); Du Xiaoyu (penalty scored)

15 March 2026	Shandong Scout (A)	1–1 (2–4 p)	Beijing Pengrui (A)	Linyi
14:00 UTC+8	He Wenxuan 34'; Jiao Mingyang (yellow card) 49' (red card) 73'; Xie Huan (yellow card) 66'		Cheng Xiyang (yellow card) 31'; Gao Zijun (yellow card) 36'; Zhang Hao (yellow card) 60'; Li Yuxuan 79', (yellow card) 79'; Wei Haoran (yellow card) 84'	Stadium: Linyi Olympic Sports Park Outer Field; Attendance: 1,675; Referee: Cui Yong
	Penalties
	Song Zhanglin (penalty scored); Song Juncheng (penalty scored); Xie Huan (penalty missed); Xie Yanqi (penalty missed)		Wu Weihao (penalty scored); Gao Zijun (penalty scored); Li Yuxuan (penalty scored); Wei Haoran (penalty scored)

15 March 2026	Wuhua Huajing (A)	1–2	Ningxia Pingluo Hengli (A)	Meizhou
15:00 UTC+8	Wu Qihao 35', (yellow card) 39'; Li Wencong (yellow card) 90+7'		Ding Kaile (yellow card) 45'; Epolan 61', 90+1'; Wang Jiakun (yellow card) 90+7'	Stadium: Hengbei Football Town Field No.9; Attendance: 215; Referee: Wen Shiwei

15 March 2026	Wuhan Lianzhen (A)	6–0	Shenzhen Keysida (A)	Wuhan
15:00 UTC+8	Chen Fangzhou 23', 90+1', (yellow card) 34'; Guo Zicheng (yellow card) 55', (goal) 87'; Liang Ye 75'; Gong Junhan (yellow card) 78'; Liu Ruichen 79'; Enqer 90+8'; Yu Bowen (yellow card) 90+10'		Wang Yong (yellow card) 53'	Stadium: Tazi Lake Football Training Base Field No.1; Attendance: 278; Referee: Chen Jindong

15 March 2026	Liaocheng Legend (A)	1–0	Nantong Home Textile City (A)	Liaocheng
15:00 UTC+8	Wu Haoran (yellow card) 47'; Tian Xin 64' (pen.); Li Tongrui (yellow card) 86'		Wang Zhenzhe (yellow card) 17'; Ren Yuxuan (yellow card) 76'	Stadium: Liaocheng Aosen Sports Center Stadium; Attendance: 10,283; Referee: Wang Yang

15 March 2026	Quanzhou Qinggong (A)	2–0	Guizhou Feiying (A)	Quanzhou
15:00 UTC+8	Wang Jinpeng 60'; Li Zhengyu (yellow card) 65', (goal) 77' (pen.)		Xiao Yang (yellow card) 10'	Stadium: Jinjiang Campus of Quanzhou Vocational and Technical University Stadium; Attendance: 868; Referee: Cui Tingbin

== Second round ==
The draw for the second round took place on 4 March 2026.

Number of teams per tier still in competition
Chinese Super League	China League One	China League Two	Amateur	Total
16 / 16	16 / 16	19 / 19	13 / 29	64 / 80

18 April 2026	Shanghai Imair (A)	4–2	Changchun Xidu (3)	Shanghai
14:30 UTC+8	Yan Jiahao 34'; Li Yile 36'; Wang Jun 45+1'; Enwer 51'; Tang Daozheng (yellow card) 60'; Zhu Pengchao (yellow card) 71'		Ma Pujia (yellow card) 31'; Zhou Yan (yellow card) 46'; Nuryasin 49'; Liu Jiahao (yellow card) 66'; Damlinjab 70'; Zhu Xusheng (yellow card) 81'	Stadium: Yuanshen Sports Centre Stadium; Attendance: 780; Referee: Wu Kai

18 April 2026	Beijing Pengrui (A)	2–1	Guizhou Guiyang Athletic (3)	Beijing
15:00 UTC+8	Cheng Xiyang 13' (pen.); Wu Weihao 46'; Zhang Hao (yellow card) 52'; Wei Haoran (yellow card) 63'; Li Yuxuan (yellow card) 74'		Liang Huan 50'; Lu Wentao (yellow card) 72'; Wu Zhongcan (yellow card) 82'; Feng Yifan (yellow card) 90+1'	Stadium: Tongzhou Canal Olympic Sports Center Stadium; Attendance: 5,566; Referee: Li Peng

18 April 2026	Yulin Mobei Miners (A)	2–0	Ganzhou Ruishi (3)	Yulin
15:00 UTC+8	Zhong Jiyu 13'; Yu Shuai 71' (pen.)		Han Mufan (yellow card) 87'; Han Fenglin (yellow card) 90+2'	Stadium: Yulin Sports Center Stadium; Attendance: 11,981; Referee: Hu Yuxin

18 April 2026	Wuhan Lianzhen (A)	1–0	Xiamen Feilu (3)	Wuhan
15:00 UTC+8	Wang Tianci (yellow card) 14'; Xiao Weijie (yellow card) 35'; Tian Xin (yellow card) 52'; Xu Zhicheng (yellow card) 63', (goal) 69'		Wu Yuchen (yellow card) 32'; Liao Lei (yellow card) 57'; Chen Zeng (yellow card) 59'; Shi Yunfeng (yellow card) 63'; Cui Wei (yellow card) 71' (yellow-red card) 90+4'	Stadium: Tazi Lake Football Training Base Field No.1; Attendance: 432; Referee: Zhang Junwei

18 April 2026	Ningxia Pingluo Hengli (A)	0–2	Hangzhou Linping Wuyue (3)	Yinchuan
19:00 UTC+8	Aysan (yellow card) 13'; Ma Siyi (yellow card) 45+1'; Shi Weihua (yellow card) 84'		Li Yadi 53'; Li Shisen (yellow card) 85'; Xiang Yuheng (yellow card) 87', (goal) 89'	Stadium: Helan Mountain Stadium; Attendance: 9,340; Referee: Wang Xiao (referee)

18 April 2026	Guangdong Red Treasure (A)	1–4	Lanzhou Longyuan Athletic (3)	Guangzhou
19:35 UTC+8	Chen Zhaolin (yellow card) 30'; Li Zhenyu (red card) 50'; Liang Weihong (yellow card) 53'; Luo Hanbowen 71' (o.g.); Chen Junjie (yellow card) 80'		Lu Jianchen 31'; Wang Si (yellow card) 43'; Sun Xinkai 86'; Yang Shengming 88', 90+5'; Sun Xinkai (yellow card) 89'	Stadium: Huadu Stadium; Attendance: 1,300; Referee: Cheng Wei

18 April 2026	Chongqing Handa (A)	0–1	Qingdao Red Lions (3)	Chongqing
19:35 UTC+8			Chen Shihao 21', (yellow card) 48'; Wang Guanqiao (yellow card) 28'	Stadium: Chongqing Dazu Sports Centre Stadium; Attendance: 1,320; Referee: Qin Xiaohan

19 April 2026	Dalian Kewei (3)	2–0	Wenzhou (3)	Dalian
15:00 UTC+8	Zhang Zhen (yellow card) 19'; Fu Yuncheng (yellow card) 27'; Zhang Xianbing 32'; Zhang Dachi 68'		Hua Mingcan (yellow card) 23'; Zhao Wenzhe (yellow card) 52'	Stadium: Dalian Youth Football Training Base Main Stadium; Attendance: 655; Referee: Cui Tingbin

19 April 2026	Liaocheng Legend (A)	1–1 (6–5 p)	Beijing IT (3)	Liaocheng
15:00 UTC+8	Nie Jialiang (yellow card) 41' (yellow-red card) 59'; Li Xiangyu (yellow card) 59'; Zhao Zongkai 67', (yellow card) 90+3'		Hu Jiaqi 48'; Mao Peng (yellow card) 90'	Stadium: Liaocheng Aosen Sports Center Stadium; Attendance: 12,637; Referee: Jiao Zi
	Penalties
	Tian Xin (penalty scored); Li Tongrui (penalty scored); Zhou Baolin (penalty scored); Huang Ziwen (penalty scored); Wang Wenhao (penalty missed); Zhao Zongkai (penalty scored); Chang Ruiqi (penalty scored)		Hu Jiaqi (penalty scored); Liu Tianyang (penalty scored); Cheng Yeyao (penalty scored); Wu Yueyang (penalty scored); Zhang Yuye (penalty missed); Deng Jiajun (penalty scored); Yu Kunyi (penalty missed)

19 April 2026	Quanzhou Qinggong (A)	0–7	Jiangxi Lushan (3)	Quanzhou
15:00 UTC+8	Xu Qi (yellow card) 42'		Guo Song 15'; Pi Ziyang 19'; Sun Yue 31'; Bai Zijian (yellow card) 36'; Zhou Jingxiang 41', (yellow card) 72'; Cao Enze 51'; Sabit 71'; Jiang Hang (yellow card) 82'	Stadium: Jinjiang Campus of Quanzhou Vocational and Technical University Stadium; Attendance: 315; Referee: Jiang Ning

19 April 2026	Qingdao Fuli (A)	0–2	Shanxi Chongde Ronghai (3)	Qingdao
15:00 UTC+8	Su Jingyuan (yellow card) 42' (yellow-red card) 67'; Sha Yibo (yellow card) 50'; Fan Mingxuan (yellow card) 52'; Liu Qianshuo (red card) 74'		Wang Jie (yellow card) 45+1'; Eysajan 50'; Xie Jinzhe 71'	Stadium: Qingdao West Coast University City Sports Center; Attendance: 2,917; Referee: Xue Xiangsheng

19 April 2026	Guizhou Xufengtang (A)	2–1	Tai'an Tiankuang (3)	Xingyi
15:30 UTC+8	Wang Xun 16'; Liu Guangwu (yellow card) 56'; Lu Cheng 88'		Hai Xiaorui (yellow card) 37'; Gao Jian 40'; Bai Tianci (yellow card) 90+2'	Stadium: Xingyi Lutun Football Town Field No.1; Attendance: 251; Referee: Gu Qianchi

19 April 2026	Shanghai Second (3)	1–0	Guangdong Mingtu (3)	Shanghai
15:30 UTC+8	Li Xin (yellow card) 77'; Zhang Yi 88'		Emirulla (yellow card) 50'; Wen Yongjun (yellow card) 65'; Yao Haoyun (yellow card) 70'; Xin Hongjun (yellow card) 90+2'	Stadium: Lingang Football Complex Sports Center; Attendance: 100; Referee: Guo Xiangyu

19 April 2026	Hubei Istar (3)	0–0 (4–2 p)	Nantong Haimen Codion (3)	Wuhan
16:30 UTC+8	Yu Jingcheng (yellow card) 7'; Yu Guizhe (yellow card) 58'		Xu Yuese (yellow card) 48'	Stadium: Hubei Sports Bureau Football Administration Center Football Field; Attendance: 363; Referee: Tang Shizhi
	Penalties
	Yu Jingcheng (penalty scored); Wang Zheng (penalty scored); Yu Guizhe (penalty scored); Zhang Chengji (penalty missed); Gao Su (penalty scored)		Yan Ge (penalty missed); Yu Hang (penalty scored); Dai Yuanji (penalty missed); Cheng Yi (penalty scored)

19 April 2026	Yunnan Cuanhe (A)	0–0 (3–4 p)	Guangzhou Dandelion (3)	Qujing
19:35 UTC+8	Hu Tao (yellow card) 24'		Zhang Hao (yellow card) 90+3'	Stadium: Qujing Cultural and Sports Park Stadium; Attendance: 4,160; Referee: Wu Can
	Penalties
	He Dongdong (penalty scored); Man Peng (penalty scored); Zhao Yihao (penalty scored); Lü Minghao (penalty missed); He Xin (penalty missed)		Zhang Hao (penalty scored); Dilyar (penalty scored); Wang Junyang (penalty missed); Li Haoyu (penalty scored); Tian Xiangyu (penalty scored)

20 April 2026	Xiamen Chengyi (A)	0–1	Shenzhen 2028 (3)	Xiamen
15:00 UTC+8			Jiang Wenjing 45+2', (yellow card) 55'	Stadium: Haicang Sports Centre Stadium; Attendance: 500; Referee: Liu Xindong

== Third round ==
The draw for the third round took place on 4 March 2026.

Number of teams per tier still in competition
Chinese Super League	China League One	China League Two	Amateur	Total
16 / 16	16 / 16	10 / 19	6 / 29	48 / 80

15 May 2026	Shenzhen 2028 (3)	0–2	Shaanxi Union (2)	Shenzhen
16:00 UTC+8	Yuan Zinan (yellow card) 54'; Chen Ziwen (yellow card) 75'; Huang Keqi (yellow card) 80'; Li Lehang (yellow card) 87'; Luo Kaisa (yellow card) 90+4'		Abduwahap 4'; Nureli (yellow card) 57' (yellow-red card) 64'; Guo Wuyue 77'; Wei Zhiwei (yellow card) 90+2'; Mi Haolun (yellow card) 90+4'; Liang Shaowen (yellow card) 90+4'	Stadium: Shenzhen Youth Football Training Base Centre Stadium; Attendance: 337; Referee: He Xiaochun

15 May 2026	Dalian Kewei (3)	2–1	Nantong Zhiyun (2)	Dalian
16:30 UTC+8	Yu Zeyuan 26'; Liu Zhizhi (yellow card) 58'; Zhang Xianbing 88', (yellow card) 88'; Huang Jianming (yellow card) 89'		Li Xingxian 7'; Liu Weicheng (yellow card) 20'; Meng Junjie (yellow card) 41'; Ye Daochi (yellow card) 45+2'; Ruan Yang (red card) 89'	Stadium: Dalian Youth Football Training Base Main Stadium; Attendance: 566; Referee: Ma Teng

15 May 2026	Hangzhou Linping Wuyue (3)	1–0	Foshan Nanshi (2)	Hangzhou
19:30 UTC+8	Tang Kaiqi (yellow card) 56'; Jiang Weisheng 76' (o.g.)		Yao Hui (yellow card) 40'	Stadium: Linping Sports Centre Stadium; Attendance: 509; Referee: Yi Jiajin

15 May 2026	Qingdao Red Lions (3)	1–0	Nanjing City (2)	Qingdao
19:30 UTC+8	Sun Weijia (yellow card) 31'; Deng Jiajie 49'; Fu Jie (yellow card) 75'; You Wenjie (yellow card) 77'		Fu Shang (yellow card) 90+2'	Stadium: Qingdao West Coast University City Sports Center; Attendance: 202; Referee: Lin Zhaohao

16 May 2026	Beijing Pengrui (A)	0–1	Shenzhen Juniors (2)	Beijing
15:00 UTC+8	Xu Bohan (yellow card) 29'; Zhang Zuoxiu (yellow card) 61'		Su Liangyu 42'	Stadium: Tongzhou Canal Olympic Sports Center Stadium; Attendance: 5,235; Referee: Wang Dongyu

16 May 2026	Liaocheng Legend (A)	1–4	Ningbo (2)	Liaocheng
15:00 UTC+8	Yang Yankai (yellow card) 31'; Huang Ziwen 41'		Zhou Junchen 3'; Long Junyuan 30', 76'; Zhu Baojie 45+3'; Zhou Yangjie (yellow card) 74'	Stadium: Liaocheng Aosen Sports Center Stadium; Attendance: 10,368; Referee: Dan Ning

16 May 2026	Shanghai Second (3)	1–0	Yanbian Longding (2)	Shanghai
15:30 UTC+8	Zhou Zhengkai (red card) 19'; Xu Lei (yellow card) 29'; He Shaolin 40'; Jiang Zhixin (yellow card) 45+1'; Wang Jiaqi (yellow card) 74'		Cui Xuanyou (yellow card) 62'; Hu Ziqian (yellow card) 78'	Stadium: Lingang Football Complex Sports Center; Attendance: 198; Referee: Wu Can

16 May 2026	Lanzhou Longyuan Athletic (3)	2–1	Meizhou Hakka (2)	Lanzhou
15:30 UTC+8	Wang Si 11', (yellow card) 22'; Mewlan 31'; Zhang Junzhe (yellow card) 41'		Liao Jiajun (yellow card) 41'; Wang Haoran (yellow card) 73'; Wei Xiangxin 77'	Stadium: Lanzhou Olympic Center Stadium Outer Field; Attendance: 1,763; Referee: Cui Tingbin

16 May 2026	Shanxi Chongde Ronghai (3)	1–1 (4–3 p)	Changchun Yatai (2)	Taiyuan
15:30 UTC+8	Li Jinyu (yellow card) 25'; Wang Jie (red card); Wu Linfeng 90' (pen.); Hashijan (yellow card) 90+4'		He Xin 6'; Lin Chuanbin (yellow card) 53'; Jing Boxi (yellow card) 67'; Xu Yue (yellow card) 70'	Stadium: Shanxi Provincial Stadium; Attendance: 2,268; Referee: Li Peng
	Penalties
	Wu Linfeng (penalty missed); Zhang Hui (penalty missed); Lin Zhongyang (penalty scored); Weli (penalty scored); Bughrahan (penalty scored); Ding Yunfeng (penalty scored)		Jing Boxi (penalty missed); Fan Houtai (penalty scored); Tan Long (penalty scored); Fan Chao (penalty scored); Muhamet (penalty missed); Feng Zijun (penalty missed)

16 May 2026	Guangzhou Dandelion (3)	0–2	Wuxi Wugo (2)	Guangzhou
19:00 UTC+8	Wen Wubin (yellow card) 89'		Li Boxi 29', (yellow card) 77'; Wang Shengbo 36'; Li Xianlong (yellow card) 54'	Stadium: Huadu Stadium; Attendance: 868; Referee: Wang Xiao

16 May 2026	Yulin Mobei Miners (A)	0–2	Suzhou Dongwu (2)	Yulin
19:30 UTC+8				Stadium: Yulin Sports Center Stadium

17 May 2026	Shanghai Imair (A)	4–2	Jiangxi Dingnan United (2)	Shanghai
15:00 UTC+8				Stadium: Yuanshen Sports Centre Stadium

17 May 2026	Wuhan Lianzhen (A)	0–1	Guangdong GZ-Power (2)	Wuhan
15:00 UTC+8				Stadium: Tazi Lake Football Training Base Field No.1

17 May 2026	Guizhou Xufengtang (A)	0–0 (2–4 p)	Shijiazhuang Gongfu (2)	Xingyi
15:30 UTC+8				Stadium: Xingyi Lutun Football Town Field No.1

17 May 2026	Hubei Istar (3)	0–4	Guangxi Hengchen (2)	Wuhan
19:30 UTC+8				Stadium: Hubei Sports Bureau Football Administration Center Football Field

17 May 2026	Jiangxi Lushan (3)	2–0	Dalian K'un City (2)	Jiujiang
19:30 UTC+8				Stadium: Ruichang Sports Park Stadium

== Fourth round ==
The draw for the fourth round took place on 4 March 2026.

Number of teams per tier still in competition
Chinese Super League	China League One	China League Two	Amateur	Total
16 / 16	8 / 16	7 / 19	1 / 29	32 / 80

19 June 2026	Shanghai Second (3)	1–2	Shanghai Port (1)	Shanghai
15:30 UTC+8				Stadium: Lingang Football Complex Sports Center

19 June 2026	Dalian Kewei (3)	1–0	Liaoning Tieren (1)	Dalian
15:30 UTC+8				Stadium: Dalian Sports Centre Stadium

19 June 2026	Shanxi Chongde Ronghai (3)	1–1 (4–5 p)	Qingdao West Coast (1)	Taiyuan
15:30 UTC+8				Stadium: Shanxi Provincial Stadium

19 June 2026	Shaanxi Union (2)	1–1 (5–4 p)	Zhejiang (1)	Xi'an
19:00 UTC+8				Stadium: Xi'an International Football Center

19 June 2026	Shenzhen Juniors (2)	1–3	Shenzhen Peng City (1)	Shenzhen
19:00 UTC+8				Stadium: Bao'an Stadium

19 June 2026	Hangzhou Linping Wuyue (3)	1–1 (4–5 p)	Dalian Yingbo (1)	Hangzhou
19:30 UTC+8				Stadium: Linping Sports Centre Stadium

19 June 2026	Lanzhou Longyuan Athletic (3)	1–1 (5–3 p)	Tianjin Jinmen Tiger (1)	Lanzhou
19:30 UTC+8				Stadium: Lanzhou Olympic Center Stadium

19 June 2026	Guangdong GZ-Power (2)	1–2	Beijing Guoan (1)	Guangzhou
19:30 UTC+8				Stadium: Yuexiushan Stadium

19 June 2026	Jiangxi Lushan (3)	0–2	Henan (1)	Jiujiang
19:30 UTC+8				Stadium: Ruichang Sports Park Stadium

20 June 2026	Qingdao Red Lions (3)	0–0 (3–4 p)	Wuhan Three Towns (1)	Qingdao
15:30 UTC+8				Stadium: Qingdao West Coast University City Sports Center

20 June 2026	Ningbo (2)	0–2	Chongqing Tonglianglong (1)	Cixi
17:00 UTC+8				Stadium: Ningbo Cixi Stadium

20 June 2026	Wuxi Wugo (2)	2–2 (3–5 p)	Qingdao Hainiu (1)	Yixing
19:00 UTC+8				Stadium: Yixing Sports Center

20 June 2026	Shijiazhuang Gongfu (2)	0–2	Shanghai Shenhua (1)	Shijiazhuang
19:30 UTC+8				Stadium: Yutong International Sports Center

20 June 2026	Shanghai Imair (A)	0–4	Chengdu Rongcheng (1)	Shanghai
19:30 UTC+8				Stadium: Yuanshen Sports Centre Stadium

20 June 2026	Guangxi Hengchen (2)	0–5	Shandong Taishan (1)	Qinzhou
19:30 UTC+8				Stadium: Qinzhou Sports Center

21 June 2026	Suzhou Dongwu (2)	2–4	Yunnan Yukun (1)	Suzhou
19:00 UTC+8				Stadium: Suzhou Sports Center

== Fifth round ==
The draw for the fifth round and all subsequent rounds took place on 25 June 2026.

Number of teams per tier still in competition
Chinese Super League	China League One	China League Two	Amateur	Total
13 / 16	1 / 16	2 / 19	0 / 29	16 / 80

21 July 2026	Dalian Kewei (3)	1–2	Beijing Guoan (1)	Dalian
16:00 UTC+8				Stadium: Dalian Youth Football Training Base Main Stadium

21 July 2026	Shanghai Port (1)	1–1 (a.e.t.) (4–3 p)	Shenzhen Peng City (1)	Shanghai
19:00 UTC+8				Stadium: Pudong Football Stadium

21 July 2026	Shanghai Shenhua (1)	4–1	Qingdao Hainiu (1)	Shanghai
19:35 UTC+8				Stadium: Shanghai Stadium

21 July 2026	Chongqing Tonglianglong (1)	2–0	Qingdao West Coast (1)	Chongqing
19:35 UTC+8				Stadium: Tongliang Long Stadium

21 July 2026	Wuhan Three Towns (1)	2–2 (a.e.t.) (3–4 p)	Shandong Taishan (1)	Wuhan
19:35 UTC+8				Stadium: Wuhan Sports Center Stadium

21 July 2026	Henan (1)	1–1 (a.e.t.) (5–6 p)	Dalian Yingbo (1)	Zhengzhou
20:00 UTC+8				Stadium: Hanghai Stadium

21 July 2026	Yunnan Yukun (1)	3–3 (a.e.t.) (3–2 p)	Chengdu Rongcheng (1)	Yuxi
20:00 UTC+8				Stadium: Yuxi Plateau Sports Center Stadium

22 July 2026	Lanzhou Longyuan Athletic (3)	2–0	Shaanxi Union (2)	Lanzhou
20:00 UTC+8				Stadium: Lanzhou Olympic Center Stadium

== Quarter-finals ==
Number of teams per tier still in competition
Chinese Super League	China League One	China League Two	Amateur	Total
7 / 16	0 / 16	1 / 19	0 / 29	8 / 80

1 September 2026	Dalian Yingbo (1)	1–0	Shanghai Shenhua (1)	Dalian
19:35 UTC+8				Stadium: Dalian Suoyuwan Football Stadium

1 September 2026	Beijing Guoan (1)	3–1	Lanzhou Longyuan Athletic (3)	Beijing
19:35 UTC+8				Stadium: Workers' Stadium

1 September 2026	Shandong Taishan (1)	0–3	Shanghai Port (1)	Jinan
19:35 UTC+8				Stadium: Jinan Olympic Sports Center Stadium

2 September 2026	Yunnan Yukun (1)	1–0	Chongqing Tonglianglong (1)	Yuxi
20:00 UTC+8				Stadium: Yuxi Plateau Sports Center Stadium

== Semi-finals ==
1 November 2026	Yunnan Yukun (1)	4–3	Dalian Yingbo (1)	Yuxi
19:35 UTC+8				Stadium: Yuxi Plateau Sports Center Stadium; Referee: Tam Ping Wun (Hong Kong)

20 November 2026	Beijing Guoan (1)	0–2	Shanghai Port (1)	Beijing
19:35 UTC+8				Stadium: Workers' Stadium; Referee: Majed Al-Shamrani (Saudi Arabia)

== Final ==
6 December 2026
--:-- UTC+8

Shanghai Port (1)	Match 79	Yunnan Yukun (1)

Suzhou Olympic Sports Centre, Suzhou
