= Wang Bowen (footballer) =

Chinese footballer (born 2003)

Personal information
- Date of birth: 25 July 2003 (age 23)
- Place of birth: Xuchang, Henan, China
- Height: 1.84 m (6 ft 0 in)
- Position: Forward

Team information
- Current team: Viktoria Berlin
- Number: 15

Youth career
- 2011–2018: Nantong Haimen Codion
- 2018–2020: SC Borgfeld
- 2020–2021: Oberneuland

Senior career*
| Years | Team | Apps | (Gls) |
| 2021–2022 | Brinkumer SV | 24 | (9) |
| 2022–2024 | Werder Bremen II | 12 | (1) |
| 2024 | → SSV Jeddeloh (loan) | 9 | (0) |
| 2024–2025 | Nantong Haimen Codion | 15 | (1) |
| 2025– | Viktoria Berlin | 5 | (0) |

International career^{‡}
| 2018 | China U15 | | |
| 2021 | China U18 | | |
| 2022 | China U19 | | |
| 2023 | China U23 | 2 | (0) |
- * Club domestic league appearances and goals as of 2 May 2025 ‡ National team caps and goals as of 9 September 2023

Wang Bowen (Chinese: 王博文; born 25 July 2003) is a Chinese professional footballer who plays as a forward for German Regionalliga Nordost club Viktoria Berlin.

== Club career ==
Born in Xuchang, Henan, Wang started his career at Nantong Haimen Codion, joining in 2011. In 2018, at the age of fifteen, he travelled to Germany to join local side SC Borgfeld. Having also represented FC Oberneuland at youth level, he joined Brinkumer SV in 2021.

In June 2022, following impressive performances with Brinkumer SV, Wang joined Werder Bremen, being assigned to their reserve team.

== International career ==
Wang has represented China at various youth levels internationally. In August 2022, he was called up to the under-19 side for the first time.

== Career statistics ==
=== Club ===
As of 1 August 2024

Appearances and goals by club, season and competition
| Club | Season | League | | | Cup | | Continental | | Other | | Total | |
| Club | Season | Division | Apps | Goals | Apps | Goals | Apps | Goals | Apps | Goals | Apps | Goals |
|---|---|---|---|---|---|---|---|---|---|---|---|---|
| Brinkumer SV | 2021–22 | Bremen-Liga | 24 | 9 | 0 | 0 | – | | 3 (Note: Appearances in the Bremen Cup) | 4 | 27 | 13 |
| Werder Bremen II | 2022–23 | Regionalliga Nord | 9 | 0 | – | | – | | 0 | 0 | 9 | 0 |
| Werder Bremen II | 2023–24 | Bremen-Liga | 3 | 1 | – | | – | | – | | 3 | 1 |
| Werder Bremen II | Total | | 12 | 1 | 0 | 0 | 0 | 0 | 0 | 0 | 12 | 1 |
| SSV Jeddeloh (loan) | 2023–24 | Regionalliga Nord | 9 | 0 | – | | – | | – | | 9 | 0 |
| Career total | | | 45 | 10 | 0 | 0 | 0 | 0 | 3 | 4 | 48 | 14 |
