= Chen Anqi =

Chinese footballer

Chen Anqi 陈安琪
Personal information
- Date of birth: 4 June 1993 (age 33)
- Place of birth: Fengcheng, Liaoning, China
- Height: 1.88 m (6 ft 2 in)
- Position: Goalkeeper

Team information
- Current team: Kunming City
- Number: 23

Senior career*
Years	Team	Apps	(Gls)
2012–2013	Shenyang Dongjin	9	(0)
2015–2018	Chongqing Dangdai	0	(0)
2019–2021	Kunshan FC	34	(0)
2023	Shanxi Chongde Ronghai		
2024-	Kunming City	10	(0)
- * Club domestic league appearances and goals as of 31 December 2020

Chen Anqi (Chinese: 陈安琪; pinyin: Chén Ānqí; born 4 June 1993) is a Chinese footballer who currently plays for China League Two side Kunming City.

== Club career ==
Chen Anqi started his professional football career in 2012 when he was promoted to China League One side Shenyang Dongjin's first team squad. He made nine league appearances in the 2013 season after Shenyang Dongjin were relegated to the China League Two.

Chen joined Chinese Super League side Chongqing Lifan in the 2015 season. On 25 April 2018, he made his debut for the club in a 2–0 away win over Anhui Hefei Guiguan in the 2018 Chinese FA Cup. On 2 May 2018, Chen played in another FA Cup match against Dalian Yifang with a 1–0 home defeat.

On 2 March 2019, Chen transferred to China League Two side Kunshan FC.

== Career statistics ==
As of 31 December 2020.

Appearances and goals by club, season and competition
Club	Season	League			National Cup		Continental		Other		Total	
Club	Season	Division	Apps	Goals	Apps	Goals	Apps	Goals	Apps	Goals	Apps	Goals
Shenyang Dongjin	2012	China League One	0	0	0	0	-		-		0	0
Shenyang Dongjin	2013	China League Two	9	0	2	0	-		-		11	0
Shenyang Dongjin	Total		9	0	2	0	0	0	0	0	11	0
Chongqing Dangdai Lifan	2015	Chinese Super League	0	0	0	0	-		-		0	0
Chongqing Dangdai Lifan	2016	Chinese Super League	0	0	0	0	-		-		0	0
Chongqing Dangdai Lifan	2017	Chinese Super League	0	0	0	0	-		-		0	0
Chongqing Dangdai Lifan	2018	Chinese Super League	0	0	2	0	-		-		2	0
Chongqing Dangdai Lifan	Total		0	0	2	0	0	0	0	0	2	0
Kunshan FC	2019	China League Two	29	0	1	0	-		-		30	0
Kunshan FC	2020	China League One	1	0	0	0	-		-		1	0
Kunshan FC	Total		30	0	1	0	0	0	0	0	31	0
Career total			39	0	5	0	0	0	0	0	44	0
