= Li Xiancheng =

Chinese footballer (born 2002)

Personal information
- Date of birth: 23 August 2002 (age 24)
- Place of birth: Haimen, Jiangsu, China
- Height: 1.85 m (6 ft 1 in)
- Positions: Midfielder; defender

Team information
- Current team: Nantong Haimen Codion

Youth career
- 2011: Shanghai Lucky Star
- 2011–2018: Nantong Haimen Codion
- 2018–2020: SC Borgfeld
- 2020–2021: FC Oberneuland

Senior career*
Years	Team	Apps	(Gls)
2021–2022	Brinkumer SV	22	(4)
2022–2024	Werder Bremen II	20	(0)
2024–2025	Nantong Haimen Codion	15	(1)
2025	Viktoria Berlin	0	(0)
2025–	Nantong Haimen Codion	0	(0)

International career^{‡}
2017–2018	China U16		
- * Club domestic league appearances and goals as of 2 May 2025 ‡ National team caps and goals as of 14:01, 16 October 2022 (UTC)

Li Xiancheng (Chinese: 李贤成; born 23 August 2002) is a Chinese professional footballer who plays as a midfielder for China League Two club Nantong Haimen Codion.

== Club career ==
Li's father, Li Taizhen, first entered him in the academy of Shanghai Lucky Star in 2011, after noticing his son's interest in football. After being unimpressed by Lucky Star's training facilities, his father founded the Nantong Haimen Codion training centre, and Li enrolled. In 2018 he travelled to Germany to join local side SC Borgfeld. Having also represented FC Oberneuland at youth level, he joined Brinkumer SV in 2021.

In June 2022, following impressive performances with Brinkumer SV, Li joined Werder Bremen, being assigned to their reserve team. He made his debut in August of the same year.

== International career ==
Li has represented China at various youth levels internationally.

== Career statistics ==
=== Club ===
As of 1 August 2024

Appearances and goals by club, season and competition
Club	Season	League			Cup		Continental		Other		Total	
Club	Season	Division	Apps	Goals	Apps	Goals	Apps	Goals	Apps	Goals	Apps	Goals
Brinkumer SV	2021–22	Bremen-Liga	22	4	0	0	–		3 (Note: Appearances in the Bremen Cup)	0	25	4
Werder Bremen II	2022–23	Regionalliga Nord	6	0	–		–		0	0	6	0
Werder Bremen II	2022–23	Bremen-Liga	14	0	–		–		1 (Note: Appearance in promotion play-offs)	0	15	0
Werder Bremen II	Total		20	0	0	0	0	0	1	0	21	0
Career total			42	4	0	0	0	0	4	0	46	4
