= Wang Yeong =

Wang Yeong may refer to:

- Duke Nakrang (1043–1112), Goryeo royalty
- Count Gonghwa (1126–1186), Goryeo royalty
- Huijong of Goryeo (1181–1237), Goryeo king

== See also ==
- Wang Yong (disambiguation)
