= Wang Yong =

Wang Yong is the name of:

- Wang Yong (politician, born 1955), State Councilor of the People's Republic of China
- Wang Yong (politician, born 1957), former vice-chairman of the Hainan Provincial Committee of the Chinese People's Political Consultative Conference
- Wang Yong (politician, born 1971), former vice-chairman of the Tibet Regional People's Government
- Wang Yong (musician) (born 1964) Chinese rock and world music musician
- Wang Yong (weightlifter) (born 1968), Chinese weightlifter
- Wang Yong (water polo) (born 1979), Chinese water polo player

== See also ==
- Wang Yeong (disambiguation) (Korean: 왕영; MR: Wang Yŏng)
