= Luo Hanbowen =

Chinese footballer (born 2000)

Personal information
- Date of birth: 26 August 2000 (age 26)
- Place of birth: Chongqing, China
- Height: 1.77 m (5 ft 10 in)
- Position: Right-back

Team information
- Current team: Lanzhou Longyuan Athletic
- Number: 2

Youth career
- Evergrande Football School
- 2019–2020: Guangzhou Evergrande

Senior career*
Years	Team	Apps	(Gls)
2021	Guangxi Huaqiangu		
2022	Dongguan United	13	(1)
2023	Hrvatski Dragovoljac	4	(0)
2023–2024	Racing Rioja	16	(0)
2024	Nantong Haimen Codion	15	(3)
2025	Wuxi Wugou	1	(0)
2025	Guangxi Lanhang	8	(0)
2026–	Lanzhou Longyuan Athletic	0	(0)

International career
2019	China U20		
- * Club domestic league appearances and goals as of 8 October 2024

Luo Hanbowen (Chinese: 罗涵博文; born 26 August 2000), known as Luo Qisheng (Chinese: 罗淇升) prior to 2018, is a Chinese footballer currently playing as a right-back for Chinese football club Lanzhou Longyuan Athletic.

== Club career ==
Luo began his footballing career in the Evergrande Football School, where he captained his age-group's side in the school's Spanish campus. He was promoted to the Guangzhou team in 2019. In February 2020, while still in the Guangzhou youth team, he was the victim of phone fraud, and his family lost money as a result.

Having failed to establish himself in the Guangzhou first team, he left the club ahead of the 2021 season, dropping down to play for amateur side Guangxi Huaqiangu. He returned to professional football for 2022, joining China League Two side Dongguan United, where he would go on to make thirteen appearances, scoring once.

In March 2023, Luo moved to Croatia to join second tier side Hrvatski Dragovoljac, stating that he wanted to improve his technical and tactical skills. Having made two substitute appearances, he started two last league games against BSK Bijelo Brdo on 26 May 2023 and Orijent on 3 June 2023.

After four appearances with Hrvatski Dragovoljac, Luo moved to Spain to join Tercera División side Racing Rioja in December 2023. He returned to China after sixteen appearances with Racing Rioja, joining China League Two side Nantong Haimen Codion in June 2024.

== International career ==
Luo was called up to the China under-20 team in 2019.

== Career statistics ==
As of 6 June 2023.

Appearances and goals by club, season and competition
Club	Season	League			Cup		Continental		Other		Total	
Club	Season	Division	Apps	Goals	Apps	Goals	Apps	Goals	Apps	Goals	Apps	Goals
Dongguan United	2022	China League Two	13	1	0	0	—		0	0	13	1
Hrvatski Dragovoljac	2022–23	Prva NL	4	0	0	0	—		0	0	4	0
Racing Rioja	2023–24	Tercera División	16	0	0	0	—		0	0	16	0
Nantong Haimen Codion	2024	China League Two	13	2	0	0	—		0	0	13	2
Career total			46	3	0	0	0	0	0	0	46	3
