= Haimen Sports Centre =

Sports venue in Nantong, China

- 海门市体育中心
- Interactive map of Haimen Sports Centre
- Full name: Haimen District Sports Centre Stadium
- Location: Haimen District, Nantong, Jiangsu, China
- Coordinates: 31°50′35″N 121°08′20″E
- Capacity: 10,000

Construction
- Opened: 2023

Tenant
- Nantong Haimen Codion

The Haimen Sports Centre is a sports complex located in Nantong, Jiangsu, China, and is the current home of Nantong Haimen Codion. It was built by Zhongnan Construction and opened in March 2023.

The center covers an area of about 180,000 square metres and includes a stadium, a comprehensive gymnasium, a reception and exhibition center, and other outdoor sports facilities. It can accommodate 10,000 spectators.

The Haimen Sports Center is the first public infrastructure project in Haimen District to adopt the EPC model. It is also the sports facilities project with the largest investment scale, the most complete facilities, and the highest level of modernization in Haimen.

On March 18, 2023, the Haimen Sports Center hosted its first event, the Nantong Professional Football Derby Match between the Haimen Ke Destiny team and the Nantong Zhiyun team. The game ended with a 2:1 victory for the Haimen Ke Destiny team.
