= Nanhai Sports Center =

Sports venue in Foshan, China

Nanhai Sports Centre
- 南海体育中心
- Interactive map of Nanhai Sports Centre
- Location: Foshan, Guangdong, China
- Coordinates: 23°07′05″N 113°00′09″E
- Capacity: 20,000

Construction
- Groundbreaking: 2019
- Opened: 2021

Tenants
- Shenzhen (2022); Foshan Nanshi (2023–present)

The Nanhai Sports Centre is a sports complex located in Nanhai District, Foshan, Guangdong, China, which includes a multi-purpose stadium named Nanhai Sports Centre Stadium that has been the home to Foshan Nanshi since 2023. It is the only new comprehensive sports venue in Foshan and includes a stadium, swimming pool, gymnasium, national fitness complex, amateur sports school, and supporting commercial facilities. The construction of the Nanhai Sports Center began in 2019. In 2021, the gymnasium of the first phase was completed. The gymnasium of the second phase was completed in 2024.

The stadium had been the temporary home for Shenzhen in 2022 briefly. After Dongguan United played home matches in the stadium for most of the 2023 China League One season, it became the club's permanent home in the 2024 season, after the club moved to Foshan while underwent a name change to Foshan Nanshi.
