= Wang Yong (politician, born 1971) =

Chinese politician

- 王勇

Vice Chairman of Tibet Autonomous Regional People's Government
- In office April 2021 – January 2024
- Chairman: Che Dalha; Yan Jinhai

Personal details
- Born: March 1971 (age 55) Luzhou, Sichuan, China
- Party: Chinese Communist Party (1994–2024; expelled)
- Education: Sichuan University; Central Party School of the Chinese Communist Party

Wang Yong (Chinese: 王勇; pinyin: Wáng Yǒng; born March 1971) is a former Chinese politician. As of January 2024 he was under investigation by China's top anti-corruption agency. Previously he served as vice chairman of Tibet Autonomous Regional People's Government.

He was a delegate to the 13th National People's Congress.

== Early life and education ==
Wang was born in Luzhou, Sichuan, in March 1971. In 1987, he entered Sichuan University, where he majored in computer science.

== Career ==
Starting in 1991, he served in several posts in the CAAC Southwest Regional Administration, including a clerk at the meteorological station, a clerk at the Planning Division, deputy director of the Planning Division, director of the Planning Division, director of the Planning and Statistics Division, and director of the Policy and Regulatory Division. He joined the Chinese Communist Party (CCP) in October 1994. He was director and party secretary of CAAC Guizhou Safety Supervision Bureau in December 2011, and held that office until December 2015. In December 2015, he became deputy general manager of Guizhou Airport Group Co., Ltd. and vice chairman of Guizhou Airport Construction Investment Co., Ltd., rising to general manager and chairman the next year.

In April 2019, he became director of the State owned Assets Supervision and Administration Commission of Guizhou, a post he kept until April 2021.

In April 2021, he was transferred to Tibet Autonomous Region and was promoted to vice chairman of Tibet Autonomous Regional People's Government.

== Downfall ==
On 29 January 2024, he has been placed under investigation for "serious violations of laws and regulations" by the Central Commission for Discipline Inspection (CCDI), the party's internal disciplinary body, and the National Supervisory Commission, the highest anti-corruption agency of China. On July 31, he was expelled from the CCP. In August 2024, the Supreme People's Procuratorate arrested Wang Yong on suspicion of bribery. Prosecutors accused Wang of taking advantage of his different positions between 2007 and 2023 to seek profits for various companies and individuals in bidding for projects, in return for bribes paid in cash or gifts worth more than 271 million yuan ($37.58 million).

On 8 July 2025, Wang was sentenced to death with a two-year reprieve for taking bribes. He was deprived of his political rights for life, and all his personal assets were confiscated.

Government offices
Preceded by Tang Xiangqian (汤向前)	Director of the State owned Assets Supervision and Administration Commission of Guizhou; 2019–2021	Succeeded by Xiao Kailin (肖凯林)
