= Yuxi Plateau Sports Center Stadium =

Sports venue in Yuxi, China

- 玉溪高原体育运动中心体育场
- Interactive map of Yuxi Plateau Sports Center Stadium
- Location: Yuxi, Yunnan, China
- Coordinates: 24°23′40″N 102°34′52″E
- Capacity: 30,300

Construction
- Opened: 2023
- Renovated: 2024, 2024–2025

Tenant
- Yunnan Yukun (2023–present)

The Yuxi Plateau Sports Center Stadium is a stadium located in Yuxi, Yunnan, China, part of the greater Yuxi Plateau Sports Center complex, and home of Yunnan Yukun. It is currently used mostly for football matches.

The center was built for the 16th Yunnan Provincial Games and was opened to the public in 2023. The center has a total area of 200 hectares, and includes a main stadium, a main gymnasium, an exchange center, a public swimming pool, and a number of other facilities. The main stadium can accommodate 25,000 spectators, and the main gymnasium can accommodate 5,500 spectators. The exchange center can accommodate 1,700 spectators.
