= Kunming City F.C. =

Association football club in China

Kunming City 昆明城星
- Full name: Kunming City Football Club 昆明城星足球俱乐部
- Founded: 17 August 2017; 8 years ago
- Chairman: Wang Weirong
- Manager: Zhu Jiong
- League: Chinese Champions League
- 2025: China League Two, 22nd of 24 (relegated)

Kunming City Football Club (Chinese: 昆明城星足球俱乐部; pinyin: Kūnmíng Chéngxīng Zúqiú Jùlèbù) is a Chinese professional football club based in Kunming, Yunnan, that competes in the Chinese Champions League (CMCL), the fourth tier of Chinese football.

== History ==
Hainan Dingli Flying Tiger Football Club was founded on 17 August 2017 in Haikou, Hainan. In 2019, the club moved to Lingshui County and changed its name to Lingshui Dingli Jingcheng Football Club. They participated in the Chinese Champions League in 2021 and was promoted to China League Two. In 2022, the club changed its name to Hainan Star Football Club.

== Name history ==
- 2017–2018 Hainan Dingli Flying Tiger F.C. 海南鼎力飞虎
- 2019–2022 Lingshui Dingli Jingcheng F.C. 陵水鼎力靖程
- 2022–2023 Hainan Star F.C. 海南之星
- 2024 Haikou Mingcheng F.C. 海口名城
- 2025– Kunming City F.C. 昆明城星

== Players ==
=== Current squad ===
As of 4 March 2025

Note: Flags indicate national team as defined under FIFA eligibility rules; some limited exceptions apply. Players may hold more than one non-FIFA nationality.

| No. | Pos. | Nation | Player |
|---|---|---|---|
| 1 | GK | CHN | Hao Kesen |
| 2 | DF | CHN | Ou Li |
| 3 | DF | CHN | Wang Shihao |
| 4 | DF | CHN | Xue Yuxiang |
| 5 | DF | CHN | Tang Daozheng |
| 6 | DF | CHN | Subi Ablimit |
| 7 | DF | CHN | Li Guanbo |
| 8 | MF | CHN | Hu Haoyue |
| 9 | FW | CHN | Jushighun Tuyghun |
| 10 | MF | CHN | Cao Enze |
| 11 | MF | CHN | Qeyser Adiljan |
| 12 | FW | CHN | Tang Xu (on loan from Henan FC) |
| 13 | DF | CHN | Yao Zhiyu |
| 16 | MF | CHN | Tang Kangbeiyi |
| 17 | MF | CHN | Qi Long (on loan from Shanghai Shenhua) |
| 19 | MF | CHN | He Xin |

| No. | Pos. | Nation | Player |
|---|---|---|---|
| 23 | GK | CHN | Chen Anqi |
| 24 | MF | CHN | Song Xintao |
| 26 | DF | CHN | Bi Haoyang |
| 27 | DF | CHN | Yang Haoyu |
| 30 | MF | CHN | Zhang Jiawei |
| 42 | FW | CHN | Sun Zhixuan |
| 43 | GK | CHN | Xiao Baiyang |
| 44 | DF | CHN | Deng Jiajun |
| 45 | MF | CHN | Zhang Feiyang |
| 46 | FW | CHN | Xiao Chenya |
| 47 | MF | CHN | Gong Zijie |
| 48 | GK | CHN | Guo Shuai |

== Managerial staff ==
| Position | Staff |
|---|---|
| Head coach | (China) Zhu Jiong |
| Assistant coach | (China) Liu Yintao |
| Goalkeeping coach | (China) Li Bo |
