= Chen Xiangyu =

Chinese footballer

Personal information
- Date of birth: 17 February 2002 (age 24)
- Place of birth: Taizhou, Jiangsu, China
- Height: 1.86 m (6 ft 1 in)
- Position: Forward

Team information
- Current team: Shanxi Chongde Ronghai (on loan from Nantong Zhiyun)
- Number: 33

Youth career
- –2019: Jiangsu Nanjing HS
- 2020: FC Imabari
- 2020: → Kōchi United (youth loan)

Senior career*
Years	Team	Apps	(Gls)
2021–2023	Shenzhen FC	19	(0)
2024	Qingdao West Coast	7	(1)
2025–	Nantong Zhiyun	0	(0)
2025	→ Guizhou Guiyang Athletic (loan)	27	(6)
2026	→ Guizhou Guiyang Athletic (loan)	6	(0)
2026–	→ Shanxi Chongde Ronghai (loan)	0	(0)
- * Club domestic league appearances and goals as of 21 July 2024

Chen Xiangyu (simplified Chinese: 陈祥煜; traditional Chinese: 陳祥煜; pinyin: Chén Xiángyù; born 17 February 2002) is a Chinese footballer currently playing as a forward for Shanxi Chongde Ronghai, on loan from Nantong Zhiyun.

== Club career ==
Chen Xiangyu would go abroad to join Japanese club FC Imabari to further his football development before being loaned out to Kōchi United. On 11 March 2021 he would return to China to join top tier club Shenzhen where he would go on to be promoted to their senior team in the 2021 Chinese Super League campaign. He would make his professional debut in a league game on 30 July 2021 against Guangzhou FC in a 2-1 victory.

On 11 March 2026, Chen was loaned to China League Two club Guizhou Guiyang Athletic again in the 2026 season.

On 19 June 2026, Chen was loaned to another China League Two club Shanxi Chongde Ronghai.

== Career statistics ==
As of 21 July 2024.

Club	Season	League			Cup		Continental		Other		Total	
Club	Season	Division	Apps	Goals	Apps	Goals	Apps	Goals	Apps	Goals	Apps	Goals
Shenzhen FC	2021	Chinese Super League	2	0	2	0	–		–		4	0
Shenzhen FC	2022	Chinese Super League	2	0	1	0	–		–		3	0
Shenzhen FC	2023	Chinese Super League	15	0	1	0	–		–		16	0
Shenzhen FC	Total		19	0	4	0	0	0	0	0	23	0
Qingdao West Coast	2024	Chinese Super League	7	1	2	0	–		–		9	1
Career total			26	1	6	0	0	0	0	0	32	1
