= Li Canming =

Chinese association football player

Personal information
- Date of birth: 19 January 2000 (age 26)
- Place of birth: Foshan, Guangdong, China
- Height: 1.73 m (5 ft 8 in)
- Positions: Forward; midfielder

Youth career
- –2020: Guangzhou Evergrande Taobao

Senior career*
Years	Team	Apps	(Gls)
2020	Guangzhou Evergrande Taobao	0	(0)
2021–2024	Foshan Nanshi	60	(5)
- * Club domestic league appearances and goals as of 14:01, 19 May 2024 (UTC)

Li Canming (Chinese: 李灿明; born 19 January 2000) is a Chinese footballer currently playing as a forward or midfielder.

== Career statistics ==
=== Club ===
As of 3 November 2024.

Club	Season	League			Cup		Continental		Other		Total	
Club	Season	Division	Apps	Goals	Apps	Goals	Apps	Goals	Apps	Goals	Apps	Goals
Guangzhou Evergrande Taobao	2020	Chinese Super League	0	0	1 (Note: Appearances in the Chinese FA Cup)	0	0	0	–		1	0
Dongguan United/ Foshan Nanshi	2021	China League Two	26	3	1	1	–		–		27	4
Dongguan United/ Foshan Nanshi	2022	China League Two	15	2	–		–		–		15	2
Dongguan United/ Foshan Nanshi	2023	China League One	14	0	2	0	–		–		16	0
Dongguan United/ Foshan Nanshi	2024	China League One	10	0	2	0	–		–		12	0
Dongguan United/ Foshan Nanshi	Total		65	5	5	1	0	0	0	0	70	6
Career total			65	5	6	1	0	0	0	0	71	6
