= Song Xintao =

Chinese association football player

Personal information
- Date of birth: 11 October 2001 (age 25)
- Place of birth: Shanghai, China
- Height: 1.75 m (5 ft 9 in)
- Position: Midfielder

Team information
- Current team: Kunming City
- Number: 24

Youth career
- –2021: Hebei FC

Senior career*
Years	Team	Apps	(Gls)
2021–2022	Hebei FC	29	(0)
2023	Zibo Qisheng	9	(0)
2024	Wuxi Wugou	12	(1)
2025-	Kunming City	27	(3)
- * Club domestic league appearances and goals as of 14:01, 31 December 2021 (UTC)

Song Xintao (Chinese: 宋鑫涛; born 11 October 2001) is a Chinese footballer currently playing as a left-footed midfielder for Kunming City.

== Club career ==
Song Xintao was promoted to the senior team of Hebei FC within the 2021 Chinese Super League season and would make his debut in a league game on 22 July 2021 against Shanghai Port in a 1-0 defeat.

== Career statistics ==
As of 31 December 2021.

Club	Season	League			Cup		Continental		Other		Total	
Club	Season	Division	Apps	Goals	Apps	Goals	Apps	Goals	Apps	Goals	Apps	Goals
Hebei FC	2021	Chinese Super League	8	0	1	0	–		–		9	0
Hebei FC	2022	Chinese Super League	0	0	0	0	–		–		0	0
Hebei FC	Total		8	0	1	0	0	0	0	0	9	0
Career total			8	0	1	0	0	0	0	0	9	0
