= Chen Kun (footballer) =

Chinese association football player

Personal information
- Date of birth: 3 October 2001 (age 25)
- Position: Defender

Team information
- Current team: Inner Mongolia Caoshangfei
- Number: 66

Youth career
- –2021: Guangzhou FC

Senior career*
| Years | Team | Apps | (Gls) |
| 2021–2022 | Guangzhou FC | 0 | (0) |
| 2023- | Inner Mongolia Caoshangfei | 0 | (0) |
- * Club domestic league appearances and goals as of 14:01, 30 June 2021 (UTC)

Chen Kun (simplified Chinese: 陈鲲; traditional Chinese: 陳鲲; pinyin: Chén Kūn; born 3 October 2001) is a Chinese footballer currently playing as a defender for Inner Mongolia Caoshangfei.

== Career statistics ==
=== Club ===
As of 30 June 2021.

| Club | Season | League | | | Cup | | Continental | | Other | | Total | |
| Club | Season | Division | Apps | Goals | Apps | Goals | Apps | Goals | Apps | Goals | Apps | Goals |
|---|---|---|---|---|---|---|---|---|---|---|---|---|
| Guangzhou | 2021 | Chinese Super League | 0 | 0 | 0 | 0 | 1 (Note: Appearances in the AFC Champions League) | 0 | 0 | 0 | 1 | 0 |
| Career total | | | 0 | 0 | 0 | 0 | 1 | 0 | 0 | 0 | 1 | 0 |
