= Jiang Weisheng =

Chinese footballer (born 1999)

Personal information
- Date of birth: 5 September 1999 (age 27)
- Place of birth: Qingdao, Shandong, China
- Height: 1.83 m (6 ft 0 in)
- Positions: Full-back; midfielder

Team information
- Current team: Foshan Nanshi
- Number: 3

Youth career
- 2012–2015: Qingdao FA

Senior career*
Years	Team	Apps	(Gls)
2019	Tabor Sežana	0	(0)
2019	→ Primorje (loan)	2	(0)
2019–2020	Kustošija	1	(0)
2021–2022	Hamsik Academy		
2022	→ Podkonice (loan)		
2022–2023	Vrakuňa Bratislava		(2)
2023–2024	Podkonice		
2024–2025	Stará Ľubovňa	21	(1)
2025–2026	Rača	0	(0)
2026–	Foshan Nanshi	0	(0)

International career
2013	China U15		
- * Club domestic league appearances and goals as of 15 June 2025

Jiang Weisheng (Chinese: 姜伟胜; born 5 September 1999) is a Chinese footballer currently playing for China League One club Foshan Nanshi.

== Club career ==
Born in Qingdao, Shandong, Jiang started at the Qingdao FA. He travelled to France with the Chinese under-15 team, training with Metz, before a return to Asia, where he was injured while on trial with a South Korean side. In 2015, he went to Germany to train with the youth sides of Borussia Dortmund and Kickers Offenbach, before once again returning to China.

He perfected his English while back at home, before travelling once more to Europe, this time studying at the National University of Ukraine on Physical Education and Sport in Kyiv, Ukraine. While in Ukraine, he trained with a local side in Kyiv, as well as Obolon Kyiv and Arsenal Kyiv.

He also trialled with French side Auxerre and Portuguese side Cova da Piedade, where he was sidelined for three months after suffering a broken foot. He trained with Spartak Moscow, representing the Russian side at the 2018 Weifang Cup, before moving to Slovenia, signing with Tabor Sežana in January 2019, and spending the 2018–19 season on loan with Slovenian Third League side Primorje. He made two appearances for Primorje, including 68 minutes as a starter in the final game of the season; a 1–0 loss to Fama Vipava.

In 2019, he moved to Croatian side Kustošija, where he made one appearance before a move to Slovakia with FK Rakytovce, later renamed Hamsik Academy. In August 2022, Jiang signed for 3. Liga side Vrakuňa Bratislava.

== International career ==
Jiang was called up to the China under-15 team in 2013.

== Career statistics ==
As of 21 January 2023.

Appearances and goals by club, season and competition
Club	Season	League			Cup		Other		Total	
Club	Season	Division	Apps	Goals	Apps	Goals	Apps	Goals	Apps	Goals
Tabor Sežana	2018–19	Slovenian Second League	0	0	0	0	0	0	0	0
Primorje (loan)	2018–19	Slovenian Third League	2	0	0	0	0	0	2	0
Kustošija	2019–20	2. HNL	1	0	0	0	0	0	1	0
Career total			3	0	0	0	0	0	3	0
