= Zhang Jinliang =

Chinese association football player

Personal information
- Date of birth: 23 January 1999 (age 27)
- Place of birth: China
- Height: 1.84 m (6 ft 0 in)
- Position: Defender

Team information
- Current team: Guangzhou City
- Number: 31

Youth career
- –2020: Guangzhou R&F

Senior career*
Years	Team	Apps	(Gls)
2020–	Guangzhou City	24	(0)
- * Club domestic league appearances and goals as of 14:01, 31 December 2022 (UTC)

Zhang Jinliang (Chinese: 张锦梁; born 23 January 1999) is a Chinese footballer currently playing as a defender for Guangzhou City.

== Club career ==
Zhang Jinliang was promoted to the senior team of Guangzhou R&F (now known as Guangzhou City) within the 2020 Chinese Super League season and would make his debut in a Chinese FA Cup game on 18 September 2020 against Shanghai Shenhua in a 1-1 draw that was eventually won on penalty's.

== Career statistics ==
As of 31 December 2022.

Club	Season	League			Cup		Continental		Other		Total	
Club	Season	Division	Apps	Goals	Apps	Goals	Apps	Goals	Apps	Goals	Apps	Goals
Guangzhou R&F/ Guangzhou City	2020	Chinese Super League	3	0	1	0	–		–		4	0
Guangzhou R&F/ Guangzhou City	2021	Chinese Super League	3	0	0	0	–		–		3	0
Guangzhou R&F/ Guangzhou City	2022	Chinese Super League	18	0	2	0	–		–		20	0
Guangzhou R&F/ Guangzhou City	Total		24	0	3	0	0	0	0	0	27	0
Career total			24	0	3	0	0	0	0	0	27	0
