= Xu Yue (footballer) =

Chinese association football player

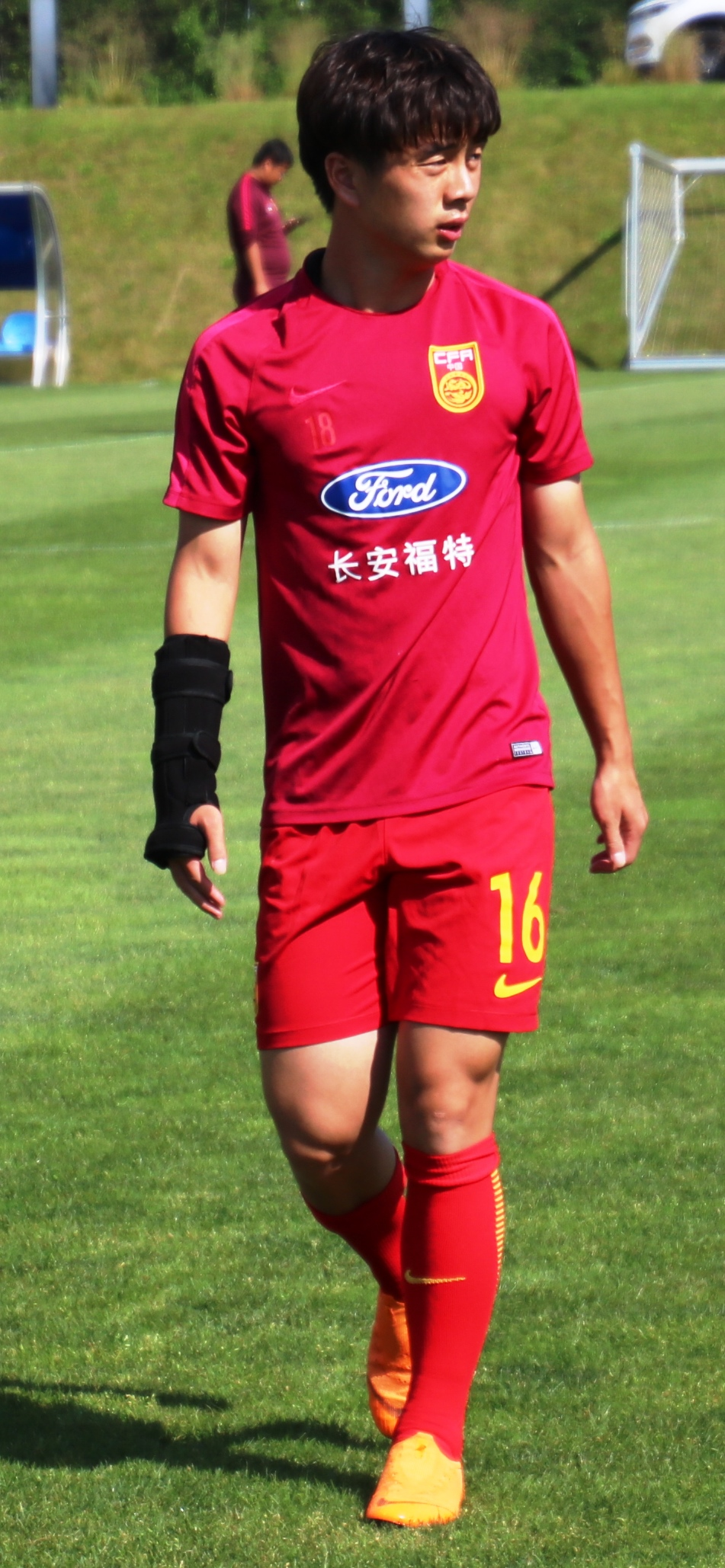

Personal information
- Date of birth: 10 November 1999 (age 27)
- Place of birth: Shangrao, Jiangxi, China
- Height: 1.73 m (5 ft 8 in)
- Position: Midfielder

Team information
- Current team: Foshan Nanshi
- Number: 29

Youth career
- –2018: Genbao Football Base
- 2018–2019: Shanghai Shenhua

Senior career*
Years	Team	Apps	(Gls)
2019–2020	Shanghai Shenhua	0	(0)
2019	→ Shanghai Shenxin (loan)	27	(0)
2020–2023	Shenzhen FC	49	(1)
2020	→ Jiangxi Liansheng (loan)	12	(0)
2021	→ Wuhan Three Towns (loan)	16	(0)
2024	Shijiazhuang Gongfu	24	(1)
2025–2026	Changchun Yatai	12	(1)
2026–	Foshan Nanshi	0	(0)

International career^{‡}
2017–2019	China U19	5	(1)
2022	China	3	(0)
Medal record
Representing China
Men's football
EAFF Championship
Bronze medal – third place	2022 Japan	Team
- * Club domestic league appearances and goals as of 27 May 2026 ‡ National team caps and goals as of 27 July 2022

Xu Yue (Chinese: 徐越; born 10 November 1999) is a Chinese professional footballer currently playing as a midfielder for China League One club Foshan Nanshi.

== Club career ==
Xu joined Shanghai Shenhua's youth academy in March 2018 after the club bought Genbao Football Base's under-19 players. He was loaned to China League One club Shanghai Shenxin for the 2019 season, making 27 league appearances and was named as the best young player for the 2019 China League One season. On 16 July 2020, Xu was amongst 14 players who joined Chinese Super League club Shenzhen F.C.

He was loaned to China League One clubs Jiangxi Beidamen and Wuhan Three Towns for the 2020 and 2021 season respectively, and won the division and achieved promotion with the latter. He retained his position in Shenzhen's first team for the 2022 season, making his Chinese Super league debut on 17 June 2022 in a 1-0 win over Cangzhou Mighty Lions and scoring his first CSL goal in a 3-2 defeat against Tianjin Jinmen Tiger.

On 3 July 2026, Xu transferred to another China League One club Foshan Nanshi.

== International ==
On 20 July 2022, Xu made his international debut in a 3-0 defeat against South Korea in the 2022 EAFF E-1 Football Championship, as the Chinese FA decided to field the U-23 national team for this senior competition.

== Career statistics ==
=== Club ===
As of 27 May 2026.

Club	Season	League			Cup		Continental		Other		Total	
Club	Season	Division	Apps	Goals	Apps	Goals	Apps	Goals	Apps	Goals	Apps	Goals
Shanghai Shenxin (loan)	2019	China League One	27	0	2	0	–		–		29	0
Shenzhen	2020	Chinese Super League	0	0	0	0	–		–		0	0
Shenzhen	2022	Chinese Super League	21	1	1	0	–		–		22	1
Shenzhen	2023	Chinese Super League	28	0	0	0	–		–		28	0
Shenzhen	Total		49	1	1	0	0	0	0	0	50	1
Jiangxi Liansheng (loan)	2020	China League One	12	0	0	0	–		2 (Note: Appearance(s) in Promotion/Relegation Play-offs)	0	14	0
Wuhan Three Towns (loan)	2021	China League One	16	0	1	0	–		–		17	0
Shijiazhuang Gongfu	2024	China League One	24	1	1	0	–		–		25	1
Changchun Yatai	2025	Chinese Super League	11	1	1	0	–		–		12	1
Changchun Yatai	2026	China League One	1	0	1	0	–		–		2	0
Changchun Yatai	Total		12	1	2	0	0	0	0	0	14	1
Career total			140	3	7	0	0	0	2	0	149	3

== Honours ==
=== Club ===
Wuhan Three Towns

- China League One: 2021
