= Wen Yongjun =

Chinese association football player

Personal information
- Date of birth: 23 May 2003 (age 23)
- Height: 1.70 m (5 ft 7 in)
- Positions: Winger; full-back

Team information
- Current team: Guangdong Mingtu

Youth career
- –2020: Guangzhou R&F

Senior career*
Years	Team	Apps	(Gls)
2020–2023	Guangzhou City	22	(2)
2023–2024	Guangdong GZ-Power	0	(0)
2024–2026	Shenzhen Juniors	18	(1)
2025	→ Guangdong Mingtu (loan)	24	(2)
2026–	Guangdong Mingtu	0	(0)
- * Club domestic league appearances and goals as of 23:36, 9 March 2026 (UTC)

Wen Yongjun (Chinese: 温永骏; born 23 May 2003) is a Chinese footballer currently playing as a winger or full-back for China League Two club Guangdong Mingtu.

== Club career ==
Wen Yongjun was promoted to the senior team of Guangzhou R&F (now known as Guangzhou City) within the 2020 Chinese Super League season and would make his debut in a league game on 26 July 2020 against Shenzhen F.C. in a 3–0 defeat.

== Career statistics ==
As of 26 December 2022.

Club	Season	League			Cup		Continental		Other		Total	
Club	Season	Division	Apps	Goals	Apps	Goals	Apps	Goals	Apps	Goals	Apps	Goals
Guangzhou R&F/ Guangzhou City	2020	Chinese Super League	2	0	2	0	–		–		4	0
Guangzhou R&F/ Guangzhou City	2021	Chinese Super League	9	1	1	0	–		–		10	1
Guangzhou R&F/ Guangzhou City	2022	Chinese Super League	11	1	1	0	–		–		11	1
Guangzhou R&F/ Guangzhou City	Total		22	2	4	0	0	0	0	0	26	2
Career total			22	2	4	0	0	0	0	0	26	2
