= Bi Haoyang =

Chinese association football player

Personal information
- Date of birth: 11 October 2001 (age 25)
- Place of birth: Yunnan, China
- Height: 1.85 m (6 ft 1 in)
- Position: Defender

Team information
- Current team: Kunming City
- Number: 26

Youth career
- 2017–2021: Hebei FC

Senior career*
Years	Team	Apps	(Gls)
2021–2022	Hebei FC	2	(0)
2021	→ Hubei Istar (loan)	6	(0)
2023	Chongqing Tonglianglong	0	(0)
2024	Jiangxi Dark Horse Junior	1	(0)
2024	Yunnan Yukun	0	(0)
2025-	Kunming City	0	(0)

International career^{‡}
2018	China U17	4	(0)
- * Club domestic league appearances and goals as of 00:01, 25 December 2021 (UTC) ‡ National team caps and goals as of 00:01, 25 December 2021 (UTC)

Bi Haoyang (Chinese: 毕浩洋; born 11 October 2001) is a Chinese footballer currently playing as a defender for Kunming City.

== Club career ==
Born in Yunnan, Bi joined Hebei FC in 2017. For the 2021 season, he was loaned to China League Two side Hubei Istar, where he would go on to make his professional debut.

== Career statistics ==
=== Club ===
As of 25 December 2021.

Club	Season	League			Cup		Other		Total	
Club	Season	Division	Apps	Goals	Apps	Goals	Apps	Goals	Apps	Goals
Hebei FC	2021	Chinese Super League	0	0	0	0	0	0	0	0
Hubei Istar (loan)	2021	China League Two	6	0	0	0	0	0	6	0
Career total			6	0	0	0	0	0	6	0
