= Foshan Nanshi F.C. =

Chinese football club

Foshan Nanshi
- Full name: Foshan Nanshi Football Club 佛山南狮足球俱乐部
- Founded: 19 October 2016; 9 years ago
- Ground: Nanhai Sports Center
- Capacity: 20,000
- Chairman: Ye Jun
- Manager: Li Haijun
- League: China League One
- 2025: China League One, 13th of 16
Home colours	Away colours

Foshan Nanshi Football Club (simplified Chinese: 佛山南狮足球俱乐部; traditional Chinese: 佛山南獅足球俱樂部; pinyin: Fóshān Nánshī Zúqiú Jùlèbù; lit. 'Foshan Southern Lions F.C.') is a Chinese professional football club based in Foshan, Guangdong, that competes in China League One, the second tier of Chinese football. Foshan Nanshi plays its home matches at the Nanhai Sports Center, located within Nanhai District.

== History ==
Dongguan Machong Rongyi F.C. was founded on 19 October 2016 in the town of Machong, in Dongguan. The club changed its name to Guangdong Rongyi F.C. in 2017 and Guangdong Lianghetang F.C. in 2019. The club won Chinese Champions League in 2020 and was promoted to China League Two. In 2021, the club changed its name to Dongguan United F.C. On 28 December 2023, the club changed its name to Foshan Nanshi F.C.

== Name history ==
- 2016: Dongguan Machong Rongyi F.C. (东莞麻涌融易)
- 2017–2018: Guangdong Rongyi F.C. (广东融易)
- 2019–2020: Guangdong Lianghetang F.C. (广东良和堂)
- 2021–2023: Dongguan United F.C. (东莞莞联)
- 2023–present: Foshan Nanshi F.C. (佛山南狮)

== Players ==
=== Current squad ===
As of July 2026

Note: Flags indicate national team as defined under FIFA eligibility rules; some limited exceptions apply. Players may hold more than one non-FIFA nationality.

No.	Pos.	Nation	Player
1	GK	CHN	Gao Yuqin
2	DF	CHN	Qian Yumiao
3	DF	CHN	Jiang Weisheng
5	DF	CHN	Lin Liangkuan
7	FW	CHN	Mu Zihan (on loan from Qingdao West Coast)
9	MF	CHN	Chang Feiya
10	MF	CHN	Zhong Ziqin
11	FW	SEN	Mame Mor Ndiaye
12	DF	CHN	Liu Zongyuan (on loan from Henan FC)
13	DF	CHN	Zhang Xingbo
14	FW	CHN	Zheng Junwei (on loan from Henan FC)
15	DF	HKG	Nicholas Benavides
16	MF	CHN	Li Ruiyue (on loan from Beijing Guoan)
17	FW	CHN	Li Yizhuo
19	DF	CHN	Liu Huan

No.	Pos.	Nation	Player
21	MF	CHN	Yu Zean
22	DF	CHN	Jiang Zhiqin (on loan from Guangdong GZ-Power)
24	FW	SRB	Miloš Deletić
25	FW	CHN	Abduwahap Aniwar (on loan from Shaanxi Union)
26	FW	CHN	Ge Yifan (on loan from Shenzhen Peng City)
28	MF	CHN	Yin Bowen (on loan from Meizhou Hakka)
29	MF	CHN	Xu Yue
30	MF	CHN	Huang Chuqi
31	DF	CHN	Yao Hui
32	DF	CHN	Yu Guizhe (on loan from Hubei Istar)
33	GK	CHN	Qin Haoqing
36	GK	CHN	Shi Xiaotian
37	MF	CHN	Shi Liang
38	MF	CHN	Zhang Zebin
42	FW	CHN	Huang Yonghai (on loan from Shanghai Port B)
44	FW	NED	Rodney Antwi

=== Out on loan ===
Note: Flags indicate national team as defined under FIFA eligibility rules; some limited exceptions apply. Players may hold more than one non-FIFA nationality.

No.	Pos.	Nation	Player
—	FW	CHN	Han Kunda (at Xiamen Feilu until 31 December 2026)
—	DF	CHN	Wen Junjie (at Shaanxi Union until 31 December 2026)

No.	Pos.	Nation	Player
—	DF	CHN	Ares Murathan (at Guangzhou Dandelion until 31 December 2026)

=== Management ===
Position	Staff
Head coach	(China) Li Haijun
Assistant coaches	(China) Yuan Zhe
Assistant coaches	(China) Jiang Hai
Goalkeeping coach	(China) Chen Gang
Fitness coach	(China) Wang Bingfeng
Technical Analyst	(China) Wang Sipeng
Team manager	(China) Du Hongliang

== Honours ==
League

- CMCL
  - Champions: 2020
