= Nantong Haimen Codion F.C. =

Chinese football club

Nantong Haimen Codion 南通海门珂缔缘
- Full name: Nantong Haimen Codion Football Club 南通海门珂缔缘足球俱乐部
- Founded: 10 May 2017; 8 years ago
- Ground: Haimen Sports Centre Stadium
- Capacity: 10,095
- Manager: Gao Wangguo
- League: China League Two
- 2024: China League Two, 10th of 20

Nantong Haimen Codion Football Club (Chinese: 南通海门珂缔缘足球俱乐部; pinyin: Nántōng Hǎimén Kēdìyuán Zúqiú Jùlèbù), commonly known as Haimen Codion, is a Chinese professional football club based in Nantong, Jiangsu, that competes in China League Two, the third tier of Chinese football. Nantong Haimen Codion plays its home matches at the Haimen Sports Centre, located within Haimen District.

== History ==
Haimen Codion F.C. was founded on 21 May 2011. In 2017, the club changed its name to Jiangsu Lancy F.C., then changed its name to Jiangsu Lancy Codion F.C. in the same year. In 2018, the club changed its name to Jiangsu Zhongnan Codion F.C. The club participated in Chinese Champions League in 2021 and was promoted to China League Two. In 2022, the club changed its name to Nantong Haimen Codion F.C.

== Name history ==
- 2018–2021 Jiangsu Zhongnan Codion F.C. 江苏中南珂缔缘
- 2022– Nantong Haimen Codion F.C. 南通海门珂缔缘

== Honours ==
League

- CMCL
  - Runners-up: 2021
