= List of Chinese football transfers summer 2024 =

This is a list of Chinese football transfers for the 2024 season summer transfer window. Only transfers featuring the Chinese Super League, China League One, and China League Two are listed. The 2024 summer transfer window opened on 17 June 2024 and will close on 15 July 2024.

== Transfers ==
All players and clubs without a flag are affiliated with the Chinese Football Association.

| Date | Player | Moving from | Moving to | Fee |
|---|---|---|---|---|
| 12 April 2024 | Wu Wei | Cangzhou Mighty Lions | Xiamen 1026 | Free |
| 13 April 2024 | Wu Dingmao | Dalian K'un City | Jiangsu Landhouse Dong Victory | Free |
| 13 April 2024 | Qu Cheng | Nanjing City | Jiangsu Landhouse Dong Victory | Free |
| 10 June 2024 | Wang Chu | Shenzhen Peng City | Retired | Free |
| 14 June 2024 | Ran Weifeng | Dalian K'un City | Chengdu Rongcheng | Loan return |
| 17 June 2024 | (Hong Kong) Shinichi Chan | (Hong Kong) Kitchee | Shanghai Shenhua | Undisclosed |
| 17 June 2024 | Liu Ziming | Qingdao West Coast | Liaoning Tieren | Free |
| 17 June 2024 | Gao Tianyu | Qingdao West Coast | Zhejiang | Loan return |
| 17 June 2024 | Gao Tianyu | Zhejiang | Shaanxi Union | Loan |
| 18 June 2024 | (Hong Kong) Tsui Wang Kit | (Hong Kong) Lee Man | Yunnan Yukun | Undisclosed |
| 18 June 2024 | Yeljan Shinar | Nantong Zhiyun | Henan | Undisclosed |
| 18 June 2024 | He Guan | Shanghai Port | Henan | Loan |
| 19 June 2024 | (Brazil) João Carlos | (Portugal) Estoril | Liaoning Tieren | Free |
| 19 June 2024 | Xu Junmin | Unattached | Nantong Zhiyun | Free |
| 19 June 2024 | Liang Shaowen | Beijing Guoan | Nantong Zhiyun | Loan |
| 19 June 2024 | Han Guanghui | Yanbian Longding | Shenzhen Juniors | Free |
| 19 June 2024 | Jin Yangyang | Shanghai Shenhua | Qingdao West Coast | Loan |
| 19 June 2024 | Zhu Yue | Shanghai Shenhua | Cangzhou Mighty Lions | Loan |
| 20 June 2024 | Muzapar Muhta | Shenzhen Peng City | Jiangxi Lushan | Loan |
| 20 June 2024 | Sherzat Nur | Shanghai Jiading Huilong | Hubei Istar | Loan return |
| 20 June 2024 | Sherzat Nur | Hubei Istar | Jiangxi Lushan | Loan |
| 20 June 2024 | Ding Haifeng | Tianjin Jinmen Tiger | Henan | Loan |
| 20 June 2024 | Chen Yunhua | Guangxi Pingguo Haliao | Jiangxi Lushan | Loan |
| 20 June 2024 | Chen Yuhao | Wuhan Three Towns | Qingdao West Coast | Loan |
| 20 June 2024 | Xu Junchi | Zhejiang | Shijiazhuang Gongfu | Loan |
| 20 June 2024 | Ablikim Abdusalam | Zhejiang | Shijiazhuang Gongfu | Loan |
| 20 June 2024 | He Wei | Shijiazhuang Gongfu | Wuxi Wugo | Loan |
| 20 June 2024 | Chen Yi | Heilongjiang Ice City | Wuxi Wugo | Free |
| 20 June 2024 | Chen Kerui | Chongqing Tonglianglong | Rizhao Yuqi | Free |
| 21 June 2024 | Mustapa Tash | Chongqing Tonglianglong | Shandong Taishan | Loan return |
| 21 June 2024 | Song Chen | Liaoning Tieren | Dalian K'un City | Free |
| 21 June 2024 | Cui Hao | Jiangxi Lushan | Dalian K'un City | Free |
| 21 June 2024 | Elper Elham | Wuhan Three Towns | Shanghai MHI KLions | Free |
| 21 June 2024 | Zhao Mingjian | Foshan Nanshi | Dalian Yingbo | Free |
| 21 June 2024 | You Wenjie | Shijiazhuang Gongfu | Wuhan Three Towns | Loan return |
| 21 June 2024 | Huang Wei | Nanjing City | Foshan Nanshi | Free |
| 22 June 2024 | Shahsat Hujahmat | Heilongjiang Ice City | Shenzhen Peng City | Undisclosed |
| 22 June 2024 | Song Long | Shandong Taishan | Qingdao Hainiu | Loan |
| 22 June 2024 | Chen Kanglin | (Portugal) Oriental Dragon | Guangdong GZ-Power | Loan |
| 23 June 2024 | (Republic of Ireland) Jimmy Mwanga | (Northern Cyprus) Alsancak Yeşilova | Qingdao Red Lions | Undisclosed |
| 23 June 2024 | (England) Ayo Obileye | (Scotland) Livingston | Cangzhou Mighty Lions | Free |
| 23 June 2024 | Han Rongze | Shandong Taishan | Cangzhou Mighty Lions | Loan |
| 23 June 2024 | (Portugal) Xadas | (Portugal) Marítimo | Tianjin Jinmen Tiger | Free |
| 24 June 2024 | Pei Shuai | Qingdao West Coast | Shaanxi Union | Free |
| 24 June 2024 | Hu Ruibao | Chengdu Rongcheng | Shenzhen Peng City | Free |
| 24 June 2024 | Jia Boyan | (Switzerland) Grasshopper Zürich | Nantong Zhiyun | Free |
| 24 June 2024 | Zhao Ziye | Guangxi Pingguo Haliao | Wuxi Wugo | Loan |
| 24 June 2024 | (Hong Kong) Yu Wai Lim | (Hong Kong) Lee Man | Wuxi Wugo | Undisclosed |
| 26 June 2024 | (Portugal) Fábio Fortes | (Portugal) Lusitânia | Jiangxi Lushan | Free |
| 26 June 2024 | Zhang Junzhe | Shijiazhuang Gongfu | Jiangxi Lushan | Loan |
| 26 June 2024 | Zhong Ziqin | Foshan Nanshi | Dalian K'un City | Loan |
| 26 June 2024 | Chang Feiya | Shanghai Jiading Huilong | Foshan Nanshi | Free |
| 26 June 2024 | Bu Xin | Shijiazhuang Gongfu | Shanghai Jiading Huilong | Loan |
| 26 June 2024 | Ou Xueqian | Jiangxi Dark Horse Junior | Foshan Nanshi | Free |
| 27 June 2024 | (England) Joel Nouble | (Scotland) Livingston | Wuxi Wugo | Free |
| 27 June 2024 | Zhang Ran | Shanghai Jiading Huilong | Foshan Nanshi | Free |
| 27 June 2024 | Wang Jianwen | Unattached | Jiangxi Lushan | Free |
| 27 June 2024 | Li Suda | Qingdao Hainiu | Shanghai Jiading Huilong | Loan |
| 27 June 2024 | Zhang Junye | Shanxi Xiangyu | Shanghai Jiading Huilong | Free |
| 27 June 2024 | (Brazil) Farley Rosa | (South Korea) Daejeon Hana Citizen | Nantong Zhiyun | Undisclosed |
| 27 June 2024 | Ruan Jun | Yunnan Yukun | Shaanxi Union | Undisclosed |
| 27 June 2024 | Zhu Haiwei | Shijiazhuang Gongfu | Wuxi Wugo | Loan |
| 27 June 2024 | (Brazil) Erikys | (South Korea) Cheonan City | Shijiazhuang Gongfu | Free |
| 28 June 2024 | (Zambia) Stoppila Sunzu | Cangzhou Mighty Lions | Changchun Yatai | Free |
| 28 June 2024 | Deng Biao | Shenzhen Peng City | Liaoning Tieren | Free |
| 28 June 2024 | Chen Zhao | Nantong Zhiyun | Chongqing Tonglianglong | Loan |
| 28 June 2024 | Yu Bo | Suzhou Dongwu | Hunan Billows | Loan |
| 29 June 2024 | Huang Yikai | Guangdong GZ-Power | Ganzhou Ruishi | Free |
| 29 June 2024 | Ji Yong | Ganzhou Ruishi | Unattached | Free |
| 29 June 2024 | Guo Yi | Ganzhou Ruishi | Meizhou Hakka | Loan return |
| 29 June 2024 | Liu Xiaolong | Ganzhou Ruishi | Unattached | Free |
| 29 June 2024 | Wu Yuduo | Ganzhou Ruishi | Unattached | Free |
| 29 June 2024 | (Cape Verde) Carlos Fortes | (United Arab Emirates) Al Dhafra | Foshan Nanshi | Free |
| 29 June 2024 | Zheng Yiming | Guangdong GZ-Power | Guangxi Hengchen | Free |
| 29 June 2024 | (Cameroon) John Mary | (Turkey) Manisa | Meizhou Hakka | Free |
| 1 July 2024 | (Chinese Taipei) Ange Kouamé | (Chinese Taipei) Tainan City | Liaoning Tieren | Free |
| 2 July 2024 | Zhang Hongjiang | Dalian Yingbo | Guangdong GZ-Power | Free |
| 2 July 2024 | Ji Xiang | Shandong Taishan | Nanjing City | Loan |
| 2 July 2024 | Zhang Xiangshuo | Foshan Nanshi | Guangxi Pingguo Haliao | Free |
| 2 July 2024 | Du Jinlong | Yunnan Yukun | Xi'an Chongde Ronghai | Loan |
| 2 July 2024 | He Xiaotian | Yunnan Yukun | Xi'an Chongde Ronghai | Loan |
| 2 July 2024 | (Guinea-Bissau) José Embaló | Dalian Yingbo | Unattached | Free |
| 3 July 2024 | (Nigeria) Geoffrey Chinedu | Liaoning Tieren | (Kazakhstan) Astana | Free |
| 3 July 2024 | Chen Long | Liaoning Tieren | Unattached | Free |
| 3 July 2024 | Song Chen | Liaoning Tieren | Unattached | Free |
| 3 July 2024 | Mao Ziyu | Liaoning Tieren | Unattached | Free |
| 3 July 2024 | Yang Yu | Liaoning Tieren | Unattached | Free |
| 3 July 2024 | Hui Jiakang | Liaoning Tieren | Retired | Free |
| 3 July 2024 | Parmanjan Kyum | Unattached | Shaanxi Union | Free |
| 4 July 2024 | Chen Rong | Ganzhou Ruishi | Dalian K'un City | Free |
| 4 July 2024 | Ren Wei | Tai'an Tiankuang | Dalian K'un City | Free |
| 4 July 2024 | Wu Junjie | Changchun Yatai | Shaanxi Union | Loan |
| 4 July 2024 | (Croatia) Ivan Fiolić | Tianjin Jinmen Tiger | Unattached | Free |
| 4 July 2024 | Sun Xiaobin | Shaanxi Union | Shenzhen Juniors | Loan |
| 4 July 2024 | (Serbia) Nikola Radmanovac | (Russia) Baltika Kaliningrad | Qingdao Hainiu | Free |
| 4 July 2024 | Zhang Zichao | Jiangxi Dark Horse Junior | Foshan Nanshi | Free |
| 5 July 2024 | Tao Yuan | Shenzhen Peng City | Guangxi Pingguo Haliao | Loan |
| 5 July 2024 | Wei Minzhe | Wuhan Three Towns | Shenzhen Peng City | Loan |
| 5 July 2024 | Shewketjan Tayir | Wuhan Three Towns | Nanjing City | Loan |
| 5 July 2024 | Sun Jianxiang | Cangzhou Mighty Lions | Wuxi Wugo | Loan |
| 6 July 2024 | Jiang Wenhao | Beijing Guoan | Changchun Yatai | Loan |
| 6 July 2024 | Fu Zhenhao | Shandong Taishan B | Rizhao Yuqi | Loan |
| 6 July 2024 | (Brazil) Fernando Karanga | (Bulgaria) CSKA Sofia | Dalian Yingbo | Free |
| 6 July 2024 | (Brazil) Matheus Índio | (Portugal) Vitória Guimarães | Qingdao West Coast | Undisclosed |
| 7 July 2024 | (Paraguay) Arturo Cheng | (Spain) Racing Rioja | Beijing Guoan | Free |
| 7 July 2024 | (Israel) Eden Kartsev | (Turkey) İstanbul Başakşehir | Shenzhen Peng City | Loan |
| 8 July 2024 | Guo Yi | Meizhou Hakka | Guangxi Pingguo Haliao | Free |
| 8 July 2024 | Xiao Kun | Shenzhen Peng City | Chongqing Tonglianglong | Free |
| 9 July 2024 | (Brazil) Jefferson Nem | (Portugal) Lusitânia | Nanjing City | Free |
| 9 July 2024 | (Brazil) Wellington Silva | (Saudi Arabia) Al-Najma | Qingdao Hainiu | Undisclosed |
| 10 July 2024 | Liu Junhan | Chongqing Tonglianglong | Guangxi Pingguo Haliao | Loan |
| 10 July 2024 | Sun Qihang | Chongqing Tonglianglong | Shandong Taishan | Loan return |
| 11 July 2024 | Fernandinho | Shandong Taishan | Shanghai Shenhua | Loan |
| 11 July 2024 | Nuali Zimin | Nantong Zhiyun | Hunan Billows | Loan |
| 11 July 2024 | Zhang Yuxuan | Shaanxi Union | Guangxi Hengchen | Loan |
| 11 July 2024 | Yang Mingrui | Unattached | Dalian Yingbo | Free |
| 11 July 2024 | He Tongshuai | Wuhan Three Towns | Haikou Mingcheng | Loan |
| 11 July 2024 | Gao Yunan | Wuhan Three Towns | Haikou Mingcheng | Loan |
| 11 July 2024 | You Wenjie | Wuhan Three Towns | Haikou Mingcheng | Loan |
| 11 July 2024 | (Portugal) Joca | (Portugal) Rio Ave | Wuhan Three Towns | Free |
| 11 July 2024 | (Serbia) Mladen Kovačević | Shijiazhuang Gongfu | Unattached | Free |
| 12 July 2024 | Han Dong | Henan | Hunan Billows | Loan |
| 12 July 2024 | Gui Hong | Shijiazhuang Gongfu | Wuxi Wugo | Free |
| 12 July 2024 | (Chinese Taipei) Wu Yen-shu | (Chinese Taipei) Taipower | Heilongjiang Ice City | Free |
| 12 July 2024 | Li Xiaoting | Heilongjiang Ice City | Hunan Billows | Loan |
| 12 July 2024 | Yang Pengju | Ganzhou Ruishi | Rizhao Yuqi | Free |
| 12 July 2024 | Zhang Yixuan | Beijing Guoan | Shijiazhuang Gongfu | Loan |
| 12 July 2024 | Shang Yin | Liaoning Tieren | Guangdong GZ-Power | Free |
| 12 July 2024 | Cui Wei | Ganzhou Ruishi | Meizhou Hakka | Loan return |
| 12 July 2024 | Cui Wei | Meizhou Hakka | Guangdong GZ-Power | Loan |
| 12 July 2024 | Shi Letian | Rizhao Yuqi | Guangdong GZ-Power | Free |
| 12 July 2024 | Tong Tianran | (Portugal) Oriental Dragon | Guangdong GZ-Power | Loan |
| 12 July 2024 | (Ghana) Nassam Ibrahim | Hong Kong Rangers | Suzhou Dongwu | Free |
| 12 July 2024 | Jin Yonghao | (Spain) Racing Rioja | Qingdao Hainiu | Free |
| 12 July 2024 | Ma Fuyu | Cangzhou Mighty Lions | Suzhou Dongwu | Free |
| 12 July 2024 | Ye Daoxin | Zhejiang | Suzhou Dongwu | Free |
| 12 July 2024 | Zhao Shuhao | Shaanxi Union | Wuxi Wugo | Free |
| 13 July 2024 | Baxtiyar Pezila | Unattached | Dalian K'un City | Free |
| 13 July 2024 | Huo Liang | Ganzhou Ruishi | Dalian K'un City | Free |
| 13 July 2024 | Zheng Zhiyun | Changchun Yatai | Liaoning Tieren | Free |
| 13 July 2024 | Shen Quanshu | Liaoning Tieren | Xi'an Chongde Ronghai | Loan |
| 13 July 2024 | Wang Qihong | Liaoning Tieren | Jiangxi Dark Horse Junior | Loan |
| 13 July 2024 | (Chinese Taipei) Yu Yao-hsing | (Chinese Taipei) Ming Chuan University | Foshan Nanshi | Free |
| 14 July 2024 | Shi Chenglong | Henan | Nanjing City | Loan |
| 14 July 2024 | (Hong Kong) Oliver Gerbig | Henan | Dalian Yingbo | Loan |
| 14 July 2024 | Chen Jiaqi | Qingdao Red Lions | Qingdao Hainiu | Loan return |
| 14 July 2024 | Chen Jiaqi | Qingdao Hainiu | Dalian K'un City | Loan |
| 15 July 2024 | He Xiaoke | FC Andorra | Shandong Taishan | Free |
| 15 July 2024 | Dai Wai Tsun | Shanghai Shenhua | Shenzhen Peng City | Loan |
| 15 July 2024 | (Brazil) Tiago Leonço | (Qatar) Muaither | Shenzhen Peng City | Free |
| 15 July 2024 | Zhang Huajun | Guangxi Pingguo Haliao | Guangxi Hengchen | Loan |
| 15 July 2024 | Yu Zhuowei | Unattached | Dalian Yingbo | Free |
| 15 July 2024 | (Colombia) Boris Palacios | Unattached | Heilongjiang Ice City | Free |
| 15 July 2024 | Wei Zhenghong | Hunan Billows | Heilongjiang Ice City | Free |
| 15 July 2024 | (Serbia) Stefan Vukić | (Serbia) Vojvodina | Chongqing Tonglianglong | Free |
| 15 July 2024 | Bughrahan Iskandar | Chengdu Rongcheng | Hunan Billows | Loan |
| 15 July 2024 | (Brazil) Willian Popp | (Thailand) Muangthong United | Shanghai Port | Loan |
| 15 July 2024 | Liu Wenhao | Wuxi Wugo | Jiangxi Dark Horse Junior | Loan |
| 15 July 2024 | Huang Yuxuan | Wuxi Wugo | Yanbian Longding | Loan |
| 15 July 2024 | Dong Honglin | Suzhou Dongwu | Nanjing City | Undisclosed |

== See also ==
- 2024 Chinese Super League
- 2024 China League One
- 2024 China League Two
