= 2002 in association football =

The following are the football (soccer) events of the year 2002 throughout the world.

== Events ==
- 8 January – MLS contracts league down to ten clubs by eliminating its two Florida franchises: Tampa Bay Mutiny and Miami Fusion.
- 13 February – Dick Advocaat is reinstated as the manager of the Netherlands, as the successor of the failing Louis van Gaal, with a 1–1 draw in a friendly against England in Amsterdam.
- 16 March - A Football League First Division match between Sheffield United and West Bromwich Albion at Bramall Lane is abandoned in the 82nd minute with the scores 3-0 to West Bromwich Albion, after Sheffield United go down to 6 men on the field, becoming the only match in English professional football history to be abandoned due to a shortage of players, in a match that would be known as the Battle of Bramall Lane.
- The 2002 FIFA World Cup Korea/Japan is held from 31 May to 30 June in South Korea and Japan. Brazil wins its fifth title, defeating Germany 2–0 in the final. Surprisingly, Turkey and host nation South Korea take 3rd and 4th. This is the first time a World Cup is held in Asia and by two countries simultaneously.
- UEFA Champions League: Real Madrid beats Bayer Leverkusen 2–1 in the final. This was Real Madrid's 9th European Cup.
- UEFA Cup: Feyenoord wins 3–2 in the final against Borussia Dortmund, winning the cup for the second time.
- European Super Cup: Real Madrid wins 3–1 over Feyenoord, winning the cup for the first time.
- Scotland – Scottish Premier League: Celtic win the league with an overall points tally of 103, a new record.
- Copa Libertadores 2002: Olimpia of Paraguay wins the final on a penalty shootout (4–2) against São Caetano of Brazil.
- England – FA Cup: Arsenal wins 2–0 over Chelsea.
- Asian Champions Cup – Suwon Samsung Bluewings retain the Asian Champions Cup, defeating fellow South Korean club Anyang LG Cheetahs 4–2 on penalties. They also retained the Asian Super Cup.
- May – Arsenal wins The Double
- 31 August – Real Madrid signs Inter Milan's World Cup winner Ronaldo with a transfer fee of €45 million.
- 1 October – Gerard van der Lem is named manager of the Saudi Arabia national football team.
- 3 December – Real Madrid wins the Intercontinental Cup in Tokyo, Japan for the third time, by defeating Paraguay's Olimpia Asunción: 2–0.

== Winners of national club championship ==
=== Asia ===
- Iran – Persepolis
- Japan – Júbilo Iwata
- Qatar – Al-Ittihad
- South Korea – Seongnam Ilhwa Chunma
- Thailand – Osotspa M-150

=== Europe ===
- Croatia – NK Zagreb
- Denmark – Brøndby
- England – Arsenal
- France – Lyon
- Germany – Borussia Dortmund
- Iceland – KR
- Republic of Ireland – Shelbourne
- Italy – Juventus
- Netherlands – Ajax
- Portugal – Sporting CP
- Russia – Lokomotiv Moscow
- Scotland – Celtic
- Spain – Valencia
- Sweden – Djurgården
- Turkey – Galatasaray
- Ukraine – Shakhtar Donetsk
- FR Yugoslavia – Partizan

=== North and Central America ===
- Canada – Ottawa Wizards (CPSL)
- Mexico
  - Verano 2002 – Club América
  - Apertura 2002 – Club Toluca
- United States – Los Angeles Galaxy (MLS)

=== South America ===
- Argentina:
  - 2001–02 Clausura – River Plate
  - 2002–03 Apertura – Independiente
- Bolivia – Bolívar
- Brazil – Santos
- Colombia:
  - 2002 Apertura - América de Cali
  - 2002 Finalización - Independiente Medellín
- Ecuador – Emelec
- Paraguay – Libertad
- Uruguay – Nacional

== International tournaments ==
- African Cup of Nations in Mali (19 January – 13 February 2002)
  1. Cameroon
  2. Senegal
  3. Nigeria
- FIFA World Cup in South Korea and Japan (31 May – 30 June 2002)
  1. Brazil
  2. Germany
  3. Turkey

== Births ==
- 1 January – Simon Adingra, Ivorian international
- 7 January – Mohamed Daramy, Danish international
- 16 January – Bagas Kaffa, Indonesian youth international
- 18 January – Karim Adeyemi, German international
- 23 January
- 28 January – Jin Liangkuan, Chinese footballer
- 30 January – Marco Di Cesare, Argentine club footballer
- 31 January – Giovanni, Brazilian footballer
- 3 February – Radu Drăgușin, Romanian international
- 15 February
  - Zuriko Davitashvili, Georgian international
- 3 March – Makar Litskevich, Belarusian footballer
- 10 March
  - Ian Maatsen, Dutch footballer
  - Noni Madueke, English youth international
- 27 April – Anthony Elanga, Swedish international
- 13 May – Eugenio Pizzuto, Mexican youth international
- 14 May – Daniel Peñaloza, Colombian footballer
- 16 May – Kenneth Taylor, Dutch international
- 7 June – Tomáš Suslov, Slovak international
- 19 June – Efraín Álvarez, Mexican international
- 11 July – Amad, Ivorian international
- 25 July – Adam Hložek, Czech international
- 30 August – Fábio Carvalho, Portuguese youth international
- 20 October – Yeremy Pino, Spanish international
- 22 October – Stanislav Atrashkevich, Belarusian footballer
- 23 October – Elkan Baggott, Indonesian footballer
- 31 October – Ansu Fati, Spanish international
- 10 November – Eduardo Camavinga, French international
- 13 November – Giovanni Reyna, U.S. international

== Deaths ==
=== February ===
- 8 February – Zizinho, Brazilian midfielder, winner of the Best Player Award at the 1950 FIFA World Cup. (80)
- 12 February – John Eriksen (44), Danish international
- 13 February – Ramón Grosso (58), Spanish player
- 16 February – Walter Winterbottom (89), English manager
- 20 February – Cristian Neamtu, Romanian player

=== March ===
- 4 March – Velibor Vasović (62), Yugoslavian footballer

=== April ===
- 16 April – Billy Ayre (49), English footballer and manager

=== May ===
- 13 May – Valeri Lobanovsky (63), Ukrainian footballer and manager

=== June ===
- 17 June – Fritz Walter (81), German World cup winning (1954) footballer

=== July ===
- 25 July – Hans Dorjee (60), Dutch footballer and manager

=== August ===
- 8 August – Reiner Geye (52), German footballer

=== September ===
- 17 September – Edvaldo Alves de Santa Rosa, Brazilian forward, winner of the 1958 FIFA World Cup. (68)
- 22 September – Julio Pérez, Uruguayan striker, winner of the 1950 FIFA World Cup. (76)

=== October ===
- 6 October – Juan Yustrich (93), Argentine goalkeeper
- 24 October – Hermán Gaviria (32), Colombian footballer

=== November ===
- 1 November – Lester Morgan (26), Costa Rican footballer
- 9 November – Eusebio Tejera, Uruguayan defender, winner of the 1950 FIFA World Cup. (80)
- 12 November – Raoul Diagne (92), French footballer
- 13 November – Juan Alberto Schiaffino, Uruguayan forward, winner of the 1950 FIFA World Cup, ranked as the best Uruguayan footballer of all time by an IFFHS poll. (77)

== Movies ==
- Bend It Like Beckham (UK)
