= Guo Wuyue =

Chinese footballer (born 2007)

Personal information
- Date of birth: 8 May 2007 (age 19)
- Place of birth: Jiangmen, Guangdong, China
- Height: 1.92 m (6 ft 4 in)
- Position: Centre-back

Team information
- Current team: Shaanxi Union
- Number: 15

Youth career
- 2018–2022: Evergrande Football School
- 2022–2024: Spain (training stint)

Senior career*
Years	Team	Apps	(Gls)
2024	Guangzhou FC	0	(0)
2025	Guangzhou Dandelion	23	(0)
2026–	Shaanxi Union	1	(0)

International career^{‡}
2025–	China U19	4	(0)
- * Club domestic league appearances and goals as of 23 June 2026 ‡ National team caps and goals as of 23 June 2026

Guo Wuyue (Chinese: 郭五岳; pinyin: Guō Wǔyuè; born 8 May 2007) is a Chinese professional footballer who plays as a centre-back for China League One club Shaanxi Union.

== Early life and youth career ==
Guo was born on 8 May 2007. He began his football training at a young age and was selected for the Evergrande Football School in 2018. In 2022, he was sent to Spain for further training as an outstanding player from the school. In 2024, he represented Guangzhou in the U17 league, making 2 appearances and scoring 1 goal.

== Club career ==
=== Guangzhou Dandelion ===
In the 2025 season, Guo joined Guangzhou Dandelion and established himself as a regular starter, making 23 appearances in the China League Two and 3 appearances in the Chinese FA Cup. On 15 March 2025, he made his professional debut as a substitute in a 3–2 victory over Hubei Youth Stars in the first round of the 2025 Chinese FA Cup, coming on at half-time.

=== Shaanxi Union ===
On 28 February 2026, Guo officially joined Shaanxi Union for the 2026 China League One season. The transfer fee was reported to be €123,000 (approximately ¥1 million). On 13 March 2026, he was named in the club's squad list for the 2026 season, wearing the number 15 jersey. He was also included in the squad for the 2026 season launch ceremony held at the Xi'an International Football Center on 12 March 2026.

== International career ==
Guo has been called up to the China U19 national team on multiple occasions. In May 2026, he was named in the squad for the U19 national team's third training camp of 2026, held in Shanghai and the Provence-Alpes-Côte d'Azur region of France from 25 May to 15 June 2026, to participate in the 52nd Maurice Revello Tournament (Toulon Tournament).

== Career statistics ==
=== Club ===
As of 23 June 2026

Appearances and goals by club, season and competition
Club	Season	League			National Cup		Continental		Other		Total	
Club	Season	Division	Apps	Goals	Apps	Goals	Apps	Goals	Apps	Goals	Apps	Goals
Guangzhou FC	2024	—	0	0	0	0	—		—		0	0
Guangzhou Dandelion	2025	China League Two	23	0	3		—		—		26	0
Shaanxi Union	2026	China League One	6	0	1	1	—		—		7	1
Career total			29	0	3	1	0	0	0	0	33	1
