= Wang Junyang =

Chinese footballer (born 2007)

Personal information
- Full name: Wang Junyang
- Date of birth: 2 October 2007 (age 19)
- Place of birth: Chongqing, China
- Height: 1.70 m (5 ft 7 in)
- Position: Midfielder

Team information
- Current team: Guangzhou Dandelion (on loan from Shaanxi Union)
- Number: 57

Youth career
- Chongqing Huanhui
- –2024: Guangzhou FC

Senior career*
Years	Team	Apps	(Gls)
2024	Guangzhou FC	7	(0)
2025–	Shaanxi Union	0	(0)
2026–	→ Guangzhou Dandelion (loan)	0	(0)
- * Club domestic league appearances and goals as of 29 August 2025

Wang Junyang (Chinese: 王俊洋; pinyin: Wáng Jùnyáng; born 2 October 2007) is a Chinese professional footballer who plays as a midfielder for China League Two club Guangzhou Dandelion, on loan from Shaanxi Union.

== Club career ==
Born in Qijiang County, Chongqing, Wang Junyang played at Chongqing Huanhui before graduating from the Evergrande Football School, an affiliate of Guangzhou. In 2023, he represented the Guangzhou U17 in the China Youth Football League, and was included in its team of the season.

On 7 March 2024, Wang was promoted to the first-team of Guangzhou to take part in the 2024 edition of China League One. He was given the number 27 shirt, and was the youngest member of the first-team at only 16 years of age. On 18 May 2024, Wang made his senior debut in a 1–1 away draw against Shaanxi Union in the Chinese FA Cup, starting in the match and playing 58 minutes; Guangzhou eventually lost 7–6 on penalties. He made his China League One debut a week later on 27 May, playing 57 minutes of a 4–3 away win over Guangxi Pingguo Haliao. On 20 July 2024, he received a direct red card for a misplaced challenge, minutes after coming on as a substitute for Zhang Zhixiong in a 3–0 home victory against Foshan Nanshi. In the 2024 season, Wang made a total of eight appearances in all competitions. At the end of the season on 6 January 2025, Guangzhou ceased its operations following heavy historical debts, and Wang was subsequently released.

On 27 January 2025, Wang joined newly promoted China League One side Shaanxi Union. He chose to field the number 32. However, Wang was regularly unavailable to play for Shaanxi Union in the 2025 season as he trained with the Hubei FA in preparation for the 2025 National Games of China.

== International career ==
In December 2024, Wang was selected by the Chinese Football Association to take part in a national scouting camp for the 2007 age level. In March 2025, he took part in another edition of the scouting camp.

In August 2025, he was called up to the China U18 for a training camp to prepare for matches during 2027 AFC U-20 Asian Cup qualification.

== Career statistics ==
=== Club ===
As of 29 August 2025

Appearances and goals by club, season, and competition
Club	Season	League			Cup		Continental		Other		Total	
Club	Season	Division	Apps	Goals	Apps	Goals	Apps	Goals	Apps	Goals	Apps	Goals
Guangzhou	2024	China League One	7	0	1	0	–		–		8	0
Shaanxi Union	2025	China League One	0	0	0	0	–		–		0	0
Career total			7	0	1	0	0	0	0	0	8	0
