= Fan Ruiwei =

Chinese association football player

Personal information
- Date of birth: 19 August 2002 (age 24)
- Place of birth: Jinan, Shandong, China
- Height: 1.74 m (5 ft 9 in)
- Position: Defender

Team information
- Current team: Guangzhou Dandelion Alpha
- Number: 20

Youth career
- Atlético Madrid
- Guangzhou FC

Senior career*
Years	Team	Apps	(Gls)
2020–2022	Guangzhou FC	0	(0)
2023–	Guangzhou Dandelion Alpha	0	(0)
- * Club domestic league appearances and goals as of 14:01, 26 January 2023 (UTC)

Fan Ruiwei (Chinese: 范芮玮; born 19 August 2002) is a Chinese footballer currently playing as a defender for Guangzhou Dandelion Alpha.

== Career statistics ==
=== Club ===
As of 26 January 2023.

Club	Season	League			Cup		Continental		Other		Total	
Club	Season	Division	Apps	Goals	Apps	Goals	Apps	Goals	Apps	Goals	Apps	Goals
Guangzhou FC	2020	Chinese Super League	0	0	1 (Note: Appearances in the Chinese FA Cup)	0	0	0	0	0	1	0
Guangzhou FC	2021	Chinese Super League	0	0	0	0	2 (Note: Appearances in the AFC Champions League)	0	0	0	2	0
Guangzhou FC	2022	Chinese Super League	0	0	0	0	0	0	0	0	0	0
Guangzhou FC	2023	China League One	0	0	0	0	0	0	0	0	0	0
Career total			0	0	1	0	2	0	0	0	3	0
