= SJFC =

SJFC may refer to:

- Shenzhen Juniors F.C.
- Sichuan Jiuniu F.C.
- St Johnstone F.C.
- St Joseph's F.C.
