= Jin Liangkuan =

Chinese footballer

Personal information
- Date of birth: 28 January 2002 (age 24)
- Place of birth: Shenzhen, Guangdong, China
- Height: 1.85 m (6 ft 1 in)
- Position: Defender

Team information
- Current team: Foshan Nanshi
- Number: 5

Youth career
- Shenzhen FA
- 2017–2019: IMG Academy
- 2020–2021: Guangzhou City

Senior career*
Years	Team	Apps	(Gls)
2021–2022	Guangzhou City	4	(0)
2023	Meizhou Hakka	0	(0)
2024	Shenzhen Peng City	0	(0)
2025	Shenzhen Juniors	0	(0)
2025–	Foshan Nanshi	0	(0)
- * Club domestic league appearances and goals as of 00:01, 3 April 2026 (UTC)

Jin Liangkuan (Chinese: 金良宽; born 28 January 2002) is a Chinese footballer currently playing as a defender for Foshan Nanshi.

== Early life ==
Born in Shenzhen in the Chinese province of Guangdong, Jin took an interest in football after watching Portuguese player Cristiano Ronaldo play at the 2010 FIFA World Cup in South Africa. As a child he played a number of sports, but excelled in football, playing at school level before joining the Shenzhen Football Association.

== Club career ==
After it was recommended by a friend of his father's, Jin moved to the United States in 2016 to enrol at a high school in Philadelphia. The following year, he joined the IMG Academy, a preparatory boarding school and sports training facility in Bradenton, Florida. In February 2018 he was moved up an age group, playing with the under-17 squad, due to his performances.

Despite receiving offers from a number of American universities, including a full athletic scholarship at the University of California, Davis, Jin returned to China in 2020 after the COVID-19 pandemic, signing with Chinese Super League club Guangzhou City (then known as Guangzhou R&F). After a year with the youth team, he was promoted to the first team in 2021, and made his debut alongside fellow youth team prospect Su Yuliang in a 5–0 win over Beijing Guoan on 19 December.

Jin would go on to make three more league appearances for Guangzhou City, including his only league start on the last day of the 2022 season, as Guangzhou fielded an all-under-23 squad in their 4–1 home loss to Cangzhou Mighty Lions. After being released by Guangzhou City, Jin would sign for fellow Chinese Super League club Meizhou Hakka in July 2023.

After just half a season with Meizhou Hakka, Jin moved to another Chinese Super League team, Shenzhen Peng City, in August 2024. Again, he failed to make an appearance, and moved to Shenzhen Juniors in early 2025. This spell did not last long, and, having been linked with them in early 2024, Jin joined China League One club Foshan Nanshi in August 2025.

== Career statistics ==
As of matches played 3 April 2026.

Appearances and goals by club, season and competition
Club	Season	League			Cup (Note: Includes Chinese FA Cup)		Continental		Other		Total	
Club	Season	Division	Apps	Goals	Apps	Goals	Apps	Goals	Apps	Goals	Apps	Goals
Guangzhou City	2021	Chinese Super League	1	0	0	0	–		–		1	0
Guangzhou City	2022	Chinese Super League	3	0	2	0	–		–		5	0
Guangzhou City	Total		4	0	2	0	0	0	0	0	6	0
Meizhou Hakka	2023	Chinese Super League	0	0	0	0	–		–		0	0
Shenzhen Peng City	2024	Chinese Super League	0	0	0	0	–		–		0	0
Shenzhen Juniors	2025	China League One	0	0	0	0	–		–		0	0
Foshan Nanshi	2025	China League One	0	0	0	0	–		–		0	0
Foshan Nanshi	2026	China League One	0	0	0	0	–		–		0	0
Foshan Nanshi	Total		0	0	0	0	0	0	0	0	0	0
Career total			4	0	2	0	0	0	0	0	6	0
