= Han Dong =

Han Dong may refer to:

- Han Dong (writer) (born 1961), Chinese writer
- Han Dong (politician) (born c. 1977), politician in Ontario, Canada
- Han Dong (actor) (born 1980), Chinese actor
- Han Dong (singer) (born 1996), Chinese-born Korean pop singer
- Han Dong (footballer) (born 2001), Chinese footballer
