= Gao Kanghao =

Chinese association football player

Personal information
- Date of birth: 23 October 1999 (age 27)
- Place of birth: Zhanjiang, Guangdong, China
- Height: 1.75 m (5 ft 9 in)
- Position: Forward

Team information
- Current team: Guangzhou Dandelion (on loan from Shenzhen Juniors)
- Number: 4

Youth career
- –2020: Guangdong South China Tiger
- 2020–2021: Shaanxi Chang'an Athletic

Senior career*
Years	Team	Apps	(Gls)
2021	Shaanxi Chang'an Athletic	21	(0)
2022	Yuxi Yukun	0	(0)
2023–	Shenzhen Juniors	36	(0)
2026–	→ Guangzhou Dandelion (loan)	0	(0)
- * Club domestic league appearances and goals as of 14:01, 15 May 2022 (UTC)

Gao Kanghao (Chinese: 高康浩; born 23 October 1999) is a Chinese footballer currently playing as a forward for Chinese club Guangzhou Dandelion on loan from Shenzhen Juniors.

== Career statistics ==
=== Club ===
As of 27 July 2021.

Club	Season	League			Cup		Continental		Other		Total	
Club	Season	Division	Apps	Goals	Apps	Goals	Apps	Goals	Apps	Goals	Apps	Goals
Shaanxi Chang'an Athletic	2021	China League One	9	0	0	0	–		0	0	9	0
Career total			9	0	0	0	0	0	0	0	9	0
