= Luan Yi =

Chinese footballer (born 2005)

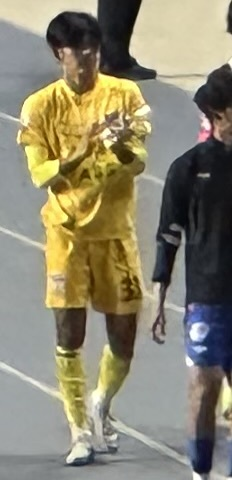

Personal information
- Full name: Luan Yi in May 2025
- Date of birth: 16 August 2005 (age 21)
- Place of birth: Qingdao, Shandong, China
- Height: 1.85 m (6 ft 1 in)
- Position: Goalkeeper

Team information
- Current team: Shaanxi Union
- Number: 31

Youth career
- 2015–2021: Qingdao FC

Senior career*
| Years | Team | Apps | (Gls) |
| 2023–2025 | Shijiazhuang Gongfu | 10 | (0) |
| 2024 | → Shandong Taishan B (loan) | 3 | (0) |
| 2026– | Shaanxi Union | 0 | (0) |

International career^{‡}
| 2024– | China U23 | | |
Medal record
Men's football
Representing China
AFC U-23 Asian Cup
| Runner-up | 2026 Saudi Arabia | Team |
- * Club domestic league appearances and goals as of 20 January 2026 ‡ National team caps and goals as of 26 January 2026

Luan Yi (Chinese: 栾毅; pinyin: Luán Yì; born 16 August 2005) is a Chinese professional footballer who plays as a goalkeeper for China League One club Shaanxi Union.

== Early life and youth career ==
Luan was born in Qingdao, Shandong Province. He began playing football in Grade 2 at Liuting Primary School in Chengyang District, Qingdao, where his coach selected him as a goalkeeper based on his mother's height (over 1.70 m). In 2015, he was selected for the Qingdao Football Association's 2005 representative team and participated in the Shandong Provincial Football Championships in 2015 and 2016.

In 2016, Luan won the runner-up at the National U11 Competition and was named Best Goalkeeper, subsequently being selected to the China U11 national team. He joined the Qingdao Huanghai youth academy and in 2017 helped the team win the Qingdao "Mayor's Cup" Campus Football League and the Shandong Sports Lottery Cup. In April 2019, as captain of the U14 national team, he made multiple saves against Kashima Antlers at the 8th Kedri Cup International Youth Football Invitational, earning praise from team advisor Peng Weiguo and subsequently being promoted to the U16 national team.

== Club career ==
=== Shijiazhuang Gongfu ===
In July 2023, Luan joined China League One club Shijiazhuang Gongfu and entered the first team squad. He did not make any league appearances during the remainder of the 2023 season.

=== Loan to Shandong Taishan B ===
In June 2024, Luan was loaned to CFA member club Shandong Taishan B for a six-month period with a loan fee of €8,000, following a strong recommendation from Shandong Taishan B-team coach Han Peng. He made two appearances for the team in China League Two during his loan spell.

=== Return to Shijiazhuang Gongfu ===
On 10 March 2025, Luan was registered in the Shijiazhuang Gongfu squad for the 2025 season. During the 2025 season, he established himself as the starting goalkeeper for the club, making 10 league appearances with 7 starts. By November 2025, he had made several key saves that helped the team secure draws and victories, including performances against top opponents in China League One.

=== Shaanxi Union ===
On 10 February 2026, Luan joined China League One club Shaanxi Union.

== Career statistics ==
As of 20 January 2026

Appearances and goals by club, season and competition
| Club | Season | League | | | National cup | | Continental | | Other | | Total | |
| Club | Season | Division | Apps | Goals | Apps | Goals | Apps | Goals | Apps | Goals | Apps | Goals |
|---|---|---|---|---|---|---|---|---|---|---|---|---|
| Shijiazhuang Gongfu | 2023 | China League One | 0 | 0 | 0 | 0 | — | | — | | 0 | 0 |
| Shijiazhuang Gongfu | 2025 | China League One | 10 | 0 | 5 | 0 | — | | — | | 15 | 0 |
| Shandong Taishan B (loan) | 2024 | China League Two | 2 | 0 | — | | — | | — | | 2 | 0 |
| Career total | | | 12 | 0 | 5 | 0 | 0 | 0 | 0 | 0 | 17 | 0 |

== Honours ==
China U23

- AFC U-23 Asian Cup runner-up: 2026
