= Shaanxi Union F.C. =

Association football club in China

Shaanxi Union
- Full name: Shaanxi Union Football Club 陕西联合足球俱乐部
- Nicknames: Northwest Wolves (西北狼); Union; The People's Club (人民球队)
- Founded: October 2013; 13 years ago, as Xi'an Huilong F.C. 20 May 2023; 3 years ago, as Shaanxi Chang'an Union F.C.
- Ground: Xi'an International Football Center
- Capacity: 32,000
- Owner(s): Qin Ying Sports (65%); Shaanxi Union fans members (35%)
- Manager: Chen Tao
- League: China League One
- 2026: China League One, 3rd of 16
Home colours	Away colours	Third colours

Shaanxi Union
- Simplified Chinese: 陕西联合
- Traditional Chinese: 陝西聯合
Transcriptions
Standard Mandarin
- Hanyu Pinyin: Shǎnxī Liánhé
- IPA: [ʂànɕí ljɛ̌nˈxɤ̌]

Shaanxi Union Football Club (Chinese: 陕西联合足球俱乐部; pinyin: Shǎnxī Liánhé Zúqiú Jùlèbù) is a Chinese professional football club based in Xi'an, Shaanxi, that competes in China League One, the second tier of Chinese football. Shaanxi Union plays its home matches at the Weinan Sports Center Stadium in Weinan, Shaanxi. Initially founded in 2013 as Xi'an Huilong Football Club and later known as Binzhou Huilong Football Club and Shaanxi Chang'an Union Football Club, Shaanxi Union is the phoenix club of Shaanxi Chang'an Athletic, which dissolved in 2023.

== History ==
Founded as Xi'an Huilong Football Club (Chinese: 西安辉龙足球俱乐部; pinyin: Xī'ān Huīlóng Zúqiú Jùlèbù) in October 2013, the club was based in Xi'an, Shaanxi, and had previously competed in various Shaanxi FA-sanctioned amateur leagues, competing as either Xi'an Huilong or Shaanxi Huilong. In 2018, Xi'an Huilong competed in the 2018 CMCL. In 2019, Xi'an Huilong competed in the 2019 Sina Golden Futsal League, a five-a-side football tournament. The club moved to Binzhou, Shaanxi in March 2020, where they have used the name Binzhou Huilong.

On 29 March 2023, Shaanxi-based club Shaanxi Chang'an Athletic was dissolved after failing to register for the 2023 China League One season. Subsequently, Athletic's phoenix club was founded as Binzhou Huilong and was purchased by investor Zhang Wei, and a number of players and staff of the former Shaanxi Chang'an Athletic setup joined the club. The original Binzhou Huilong team that Shaanxi Chang'an Union took over then formed Xianyang Binzhou Huilong F.C., a new club that would still play in the Shaanxi National Super League. In the 2023 Shaanxi National Super League season, Xianyang Binzhou Huilong finished fourth place.

Binzhou Huilong was then admitted into the 2023 CMCL, the Chinese fourth-tier, from a recommended team berth given to the Shaanxi FA by the Chinese FA, officially under the name Shaanxi Binzhou Huilong Football Club Everyday Chain Team in a sponsorship with the Everyday Chain. Under manager Huang Yong, who had most recently been a youth team executive at Chang'an Athletic, they topped their group, finishing first overall in CMCL's Rizhao regional group, to qualify for the final round. On 10 May 2023, the club was rebranded as Shaanxi Chang'an Union Football Club.

Shaanxi Chang'an Union were drawn into group B of the 2023 CMCL final round, and were up against Dalian Huayi first. Union drew the game 1–1, and three days later on 6 September 2023, it was announced that Huang Yong would no longer be the Shaanxi Chang'an Union manager. The following day, former Athletic manager Óscar Céspedes was appointed as Union's new manager.

Union then went on a two-game losing streak, an early stump for Céspedes and his players. On 17 September, after a narrow 1–0 home loss to Guangzhou E-Power and clapping the 26,156 fans in attendance post-match, club captain Ding Jie kneeled down to the Shaanxi fans in apology. On 14 October 2023, after all seven games in the 2023 CMCL final round group stage and four straight wins to adjust themselves back on track, Shaanxi Chang'an Union finished 4th in their group of 8, settling for play-offs. In the promotion play-offs, Shaanxi Chang'an Union defeated Changchun Shenhua on penalties after a 1–1 draw at the Weinan Sports Center Stadium, with Shaanxi goalkeeper Li Chen making two saves in the shoot-out to book their place in the final. On 29 October 2023, Shaanxi went on to beat Guangzhou E-Power 2–1 away from home in the play-off final thanks to goals from Ma Yangyang and Pang Zhiquan, both former Athletic players, winning promotion to China League Two.

On 26 January 2024, the club rebranded its name to Shaanxi Union Football Club. On 20 February of the same year, Shaanxi Union moved into the Shaanxi Province Stadium, and would move once again to the Xi'an International Football Center during mid-season.

== Club identity ==
Part of the club's name, Union refers to a hope that Union could "unite all forces."

Historically, Shaanxi Chang'an Athletic bore a red shirt and navy shorts, which Shaanxi Union inherited the colour scheme of, on Union's first ever kits in 2023. According to a Weibo poll posted in June 2023 by Shaanxi Chang'an Union's official account on the supporters' preferred colour for the home kit, the black option was the most popular amongst supporters, with red and yellow behind black in second and third respectively.

Nicknamed the Northwest Wolves, clubs from Shaanxi have historically had good ties with the supporters of the club. A well-known Shaanxi chant is "Shaanxi dui, Xibeilang!" (陕西队, 西北狼!), where Shaanxi dui is Chinese for "team Shaanxi", and Xibeilang is the Chinese word for Northwest Wolves. In addition, Shaanxi Union have also adopted the saying, "the People's Club for the people" (人民球队为人民), as one of the club's mottos.

During the Xi'an Huilong and Binzhou Huilong eras, the club had used two badges, both with a Chinese dragon represented, in reference to the club's name, as long is the Chinese word for "dragon". In the 2023 CMCL season, Shaanxi Chang'an Union used a modified version of the former Shaanxi Chang'an Athletic badge, with only the name and the creature on the badge different. In July 2023, the Shaanxi Chang'an Union's current badge was unveiled. Voted by fans, the badge depicts a shield made up of stylised letters S in red and C, which forms a U in bottom section, in black, which form the initials of the club name, as well as a Xibeilang at the centre of the badge. Atop the word "Union", a part of the stylised S depicts battlements, which reference the Xi'an City Wall.

First logo of Xi'an Huilong, used between 2013 and 2020

Binzhou Huilong logo used between 2020 and 2023

Registered under the name Binzhou Huilong, Shaanxi Chang'an Union used this as their official logo in 2023

Shaanxi Union logo used since July 2023

=== Mascot ===
The club's mascot is Union (Chinese: 有你安; pinyin: Yǒunǐ'ān; lit. 'Safe with you/Chang'an with you'; stylised as UNION). Union is a gray wolf that was unveiled on 8 December 2023 after a member vote on its name, and it wears Shaanxi's number 12 shirt.

=== Club anthem ===
After two rounds of voting, Shaanxi Union's anthem was determined to be Union Union (Chinese: 联合 联合; pinyin: Liánhé Liánhé) by Liang Hongrui, on 30 December 2023.

=== Kit suppliers and shirt sponsors ===
Period	Kit supplier	Shirt sponsor (chest)	Shirt sponsor (back)
2023	Li-Ning	Everyday Chain (每一天)	Sunfood (陕西粮农); SWUT
2023	Li-Ning	MLily (梦百合)	E-Ming Eye Hospital (奕鸣眼科)
2023	Li-Ning	Jin Gu Town (筋骨堂)	E-Ming Eye Hospital (奕鸣眼科)
2024	Li-Ning	None	None
2024	Li-Ning	China Minsheng Bank	Baishui Dukang (白水杜康)
2025	Kelme	None	None
2025	Kelme	Suli Aura (速力奥)	Huawuchen Guojiu (花无尘果酒)
2026–	Gointo	Suli Aura (速力奥)	Bank of China

== Stadium and training ground ==
On 22 July 2023, Shaanxi Chang'an Union played a friendly match against Uzbekistan Super League side FC Surkhon Termez at the Yulin Sports Center in Yulin, Shaanxi. Though only a friendly, the match was the first in Union's history to be played in their home province of Shaanxi.

In the 2023 season, Shaanxi Chang'an Union played all of their competitive home matches at the Weinan Sports Center Stadium, after announcing that three of the four final round matches would be played at a renovated Shaanxi Province Stadium. On 17 September 2023, in a home CMCL game against Guangzhou E-Power, Shaanxi Chang'an Union broke the attendance record of the Chinese fourth-tier, at 26,156 spectators.

On 20 February 2024, Shaanxi Union announced that the club will play home matches in the 2024 season at the Shaanxi Province Stadium for the first stage of the season and at the Xi'an International Football Center for the second stage of the season. However, on 20 April 2024, the club announced a move back to Weinan.

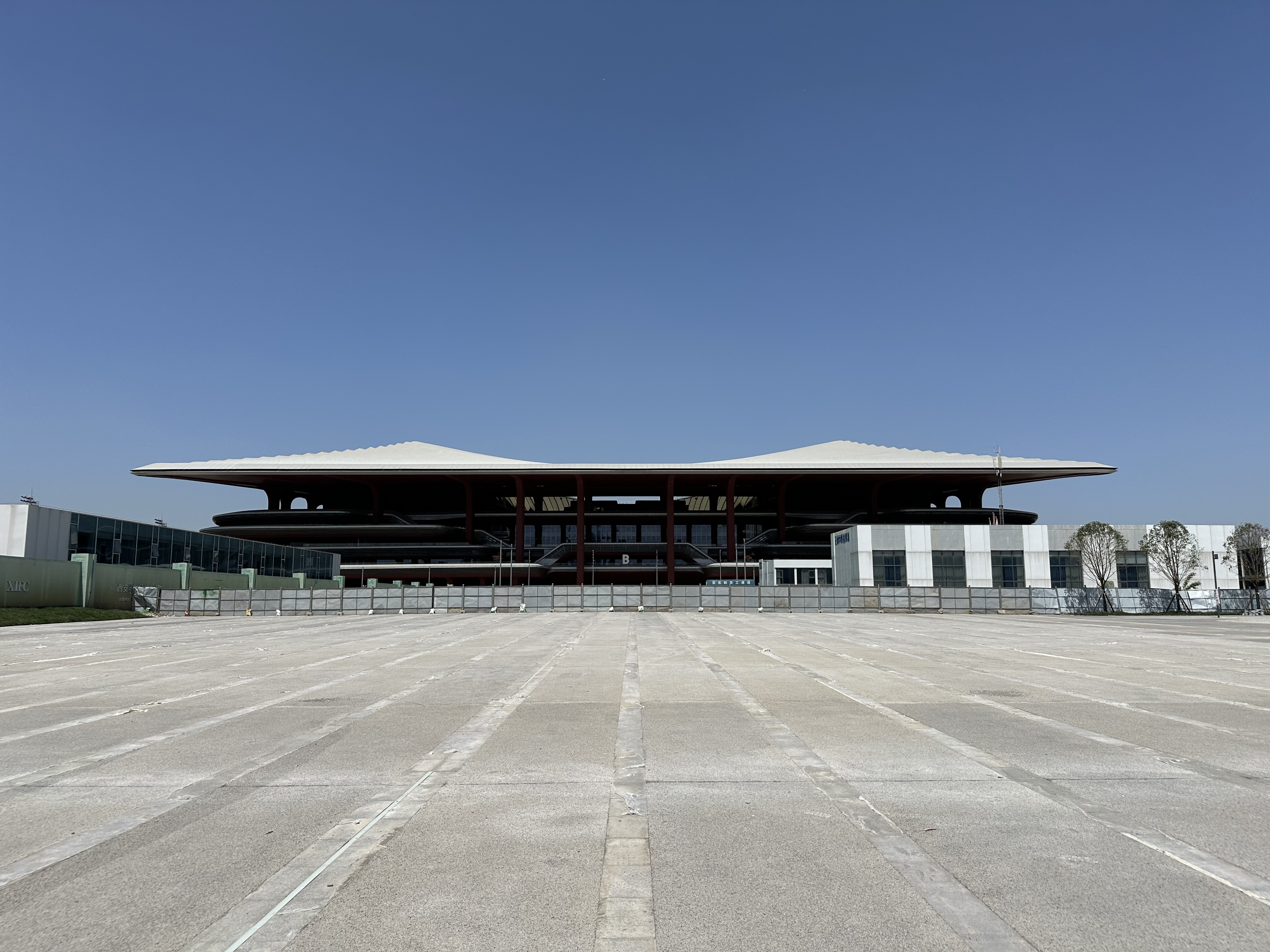
Xi'an International Football Center, the ground Shaanxi Union plan to move into in 2024

Since 2023, Shaanxi Union's training ground had been Fengdong Football Park, located in the Chang'an District of Xi'an.

== Support ==
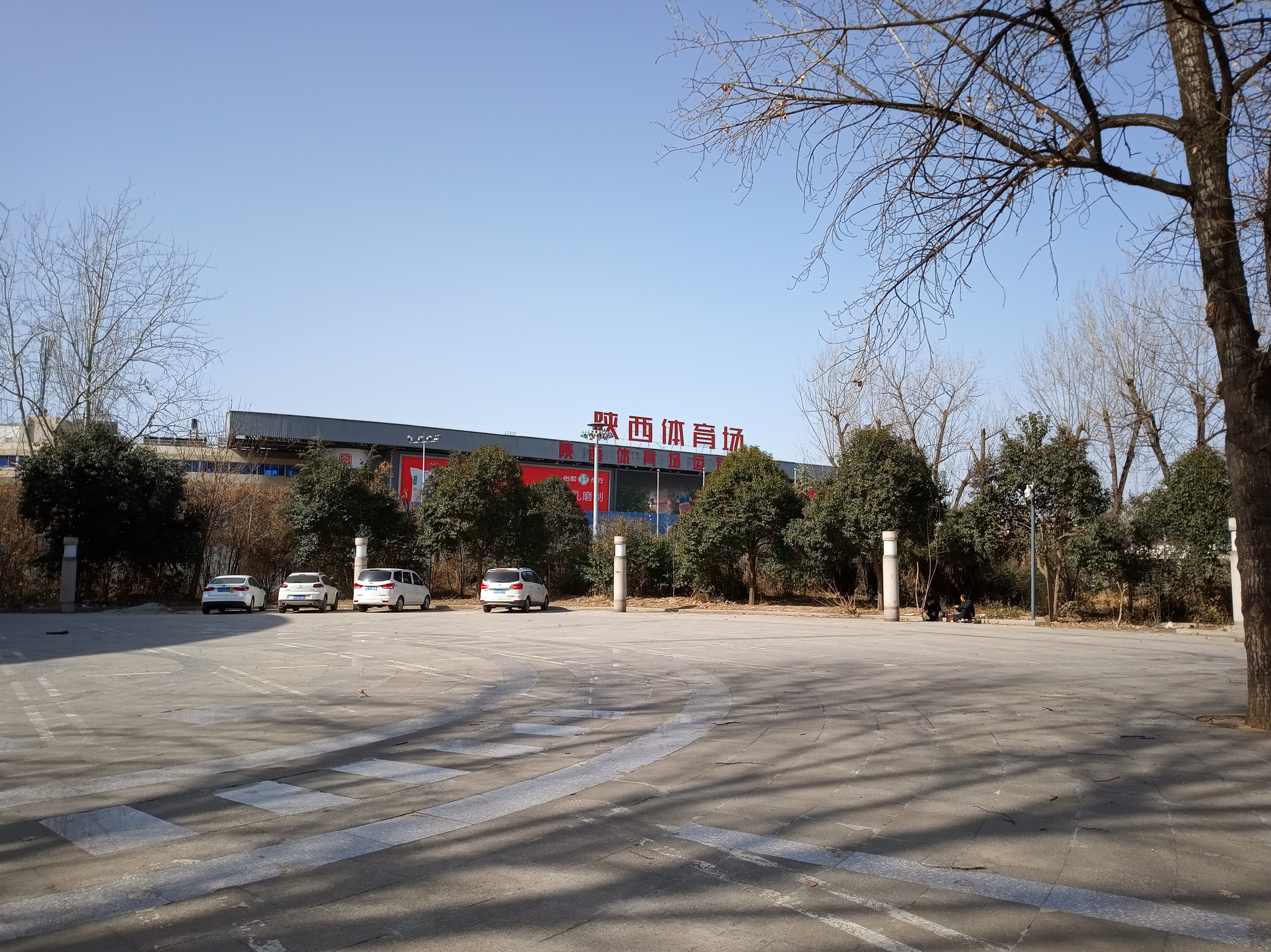
Shaanxi Province Stadium, the location of Union's flagship store

In January 2023, Shaanxi Chang'an Athletic launched a campaign to "save the club", by opening up to its supporters the purchase of club memberships, which included shares of the club and season tickets, in hopes that it would pay off Athletic's debt. Within the first day, roughly 8,000 Shaanxi supporters bought memberships, raising close to ¥10 million for the club. Two months later, Chang'an Athletic were denied entry into the 2023 season by the Chinese FA and subsequently announced dissolution, and every membership purchased was refunded by Athletic in full. Upon the formation of Shaanxi Chang'an Union in May 2023, the club left its finances in the hands of Shaanxi fans a second time, with plans to transition into being a fan-owned club. Though the two clubs had little connection between each other in terms of ownership, within the first 24 hours of Union's shares being public, over 5,200 Shaanxi supporters enrolled in the memberships. In July 2023, Shaanxi Union held a contest to decide its new club crest. The winner was voted by supporters, and all candidates were designed by supporters. In August 2023, the Jiangsu-Zhejiang-Shanghai Northwest Wolves Supporters' Group funded a team bus for the club. On 28 August 2023, Union opened their official flagship store, located just outside Shaanxi Province Stadium.

Also known as "the People's Club", noting the club's strong connections with its fans, the club is sometimes compared in Chinese media to German side 1. FC Union Berlin, for their similar names and their fan-initiated self-revivals.

== Ownership ==
Upon forming the phoenix club, Shaanxi Union had seen investment from their supporters, but the club's chairman had been Zhang Wei, a former investor of Chang'an Athletic, who made a last-ditch effort to save Athletic from dissolution. On 16 September 2023, Qin Ying Sports signed a contract to take over the club as its major shareholder, which had Qin Ying Sports own 65% of the club's equity, and the supporters accounted for 35%. Former Guangzhou City chairman Huang Shenghua was appointed as the Union chairman. Meanwhile, Zhang Wei, the former chairman and general manager, was decided to be temporarily in charge for the 35% from the supporters, until a supporter-owned organisation could be formed.

== Records and statistics ==
The record for the most appearances for Shaanxi Union is held by Ding Jie, with 20 appearances. The record for the most goals scored for Shaanxi Union is held by Pang Zhiquan, having scored 13 goals for the club.

Shaanxi Union's largest win was a 10–0 victory over Changle Jingangtui on 24 September 2023 in the CMCL. The club's heaviest losses came from two 2–0 defeats, against Beijing IT and Yanbian Longding, on 16 June 2024 and 11 May 2025 respectively.

Shaanxi Union's highest home attendances are 26,156 against Guangzhou E-Power on 17 September 2023 and 25,956 against Dalian Huayi on 3 September 2023, both in the CMCL.

The youngest player to make a first-team appearance for Shaanxi Union is Nureli Tursunali at 19 years and 6 days old in China League Two, coming on as a 82nd-minute substitute in a 2–0 win over Hubei Istar on 23 March 2024.

== Players ==
=== First-team squad ===
As of July 2026

Note: Flags indicate national team as defined under FIFA eligibility rules; some limited exceptions apply. Players may hold more than one non-FIFA nationality.

No.	Pos.	Nation	Player
2	DF	CHN	Wen Junjie (on loan from Foshan Nanshi)
5	DF	CHN	Ma Sheng
6	DF	CHN	Nureli Tursunali
7	FW	CHN	Zhong Wen
9	FW	KOS	Astrit Selmani
10	MF	NED	Rayan El Azrak
14	DF	CHN	Meng Fanning
15	DF	CHN	Guo Wuyue
16	GK	CHN	Zhao Shi
17	FW	CHN	Feng Boyuan
18	FW	CHN	Tang Tianyi
19	MF	SYR	Daleho Irandust
20	MF	HKG	Ma Hei Wai
21	FW	CHN	Wang Shijie

No.	Pos.	Nation	Player
23	DF	CHN	Jin Wenxu
24	DF	CHN	Liang Shaowen
25	MF	CHN	Cao Kang
27	DF	CHN	Jiang Wenhao (on loan from Beijing Guoan)
29	DF	CHN	Mi Haolun (captain)
30	FW	CHN	Leng Jixuan
31	GK	CHN	Luan Yi
32	MF	CHN	Qian Ruofan
33	MF	CHN	Tan Kaiyuan
34	DF	CHN	Shahsat Hujahmat (on loan from Shenzhen Peng City)
36	DF	CHN	Yan Yu
37	DF	CHN	Li Xiaoyi
38	DF	CHN	Wang Jianan
39	GK	CHN	He Lipan
40	FW	CHN	Yang Shuo
42	MF	CHN	Wei Zhiwei

=== Out on loan ===
Note: Flags indicate national team as defined under FIFA eligibility rules; some limited exceptions apply. Players may hold more than one non-FIFA nationality.

No.	Pos.	Nation	Player
—	MF	CHN	Wang Junyang (at Guangzhou Dandelion until 31 December 2026)
—	GK	CHN	Zhou Yuchen (at Xiamen Feilu until 31 December 2026)
—	DF	CHN	Elkut Eysajan (at Dalian K'un City until 31 December 2026)
—	FW	CHN	Wang Bohao (at Den Bosch until 30 June 2027)

No.	Pos.	Nation	Player
—	DF	CHN	Wang Weipu (at Changchun Yatai until 31 December 2026)
—	FW	CHN	Abduwahap Aniwar (at Foshan Nanshi until 31 December 2026)
—	FW	CHN	Wang Yuxiang (at Wenzhou FC until 31 December 2026)
—	DF	CHN	Chen Yanpu (at Guizhou Guiyang Athletic until 31 December 2026)

=== Club captains ===
Years	Captain
2023–2024	(China) Ding Jie
2024–present	(China) Mi Haolun

=== Retired numbers ===
- 12 – "The twelfth man", dedication to fans

== Non-playing staff ==
=== Administrators ===
Position	Staff
Chairman	
Chief operations officer	(China) Wen Yitan
Directors	(China) Li Qiang (China) Zhang Xiaojuan (China) Wang Huan (China) Zhang Wei (China) Xu Hongtao (China) Zhang Jingfeng (China) He Yuming
Chief executive	(China) Hui Yuxing
Executives	(China) Jin Hang (China) Zhi Gaoxing

=== Management ===
Position	Staff
Head coach	(China) Chen Tao
Assistant coach	(China) Fan Baiqun
Goalkeeping coach	(China) Guan Zhen
Fitness coach	(Netherlands) Nol Hornix
Technical director	(Netherlands) Edwin Petersen
Team manager	(China) Niu Jiangtao

=== Managerial history ===
As of 1 September 2024
Key: M = matches; W = matches won; D = matches drawn; L = matches lost

Name	Nation	From	To	M	W	D	L	Win %
Huang Yong	China	1 January 2023	6 September 2023	6	4	2	0	66.7
Óscar Céspedes	Spain	7 September 2023	1 September 2024	32	18	6	8	56.3
Edwin Petersen	Netherlands	1 September 2024	11 March 2025	7	4	2	1	57.1
Giovanni Franken	Netherlands	11 March 2025	8 November 2025	30	10	9	11	33.3
Henk Fraser	Netherlands	1 January 2026	7 June 2026	0	0	0	0	—
Chen Tao	China	21 June 2026		0	0	0	0	—

== Honours ==
League

- CMCL
  - Play-off winners: 2023

== Team record ==
All-time league rankings

As of end of the 2023 season.

Season	League										FA Cup	Super Cup	AFC		Top scorer(s) (Note: Includes goals scored in China League Two, CMCL, Chinese FA Cup.)		Stadium(s)	Att./G
Season	Division	Pld	W	D	L	GF	GA	GD	Pts	Pos.	FA Cup	Super Cup	Competition	Pos.	Player(s)	Goals	Stadium(s)	Att./G
2023	4 (Regionals)	5	4	1	0	12	2	10	13	3 (Note: Won 2–1 in the promotion play-off final against Guangzhou E-Power.)	DNQ	DNQ	DNQ	DNQ	Pang Zhiquan	9		
2023	4 (Final round)	7	4	1	2	29	3	26	13	3	DNQ	DNQ	DNQ	DNQ	Pang Zhiquan	9	Weinan Sports Center Stadium	22,850 (Note: Includes promotion play-offs.)

Key

	Chinese top-tier
	Chinese second-tier
	Chinese third-tier
	Chinese fourth-tier
W	Winners
RU	Runners-up
3	Third place
	Relegated

- Pld = Played
- W = Games won
- D = Games drawn
- L = Games lost
- F = Goals for
- A = Goals against
- Pts = Points
- Pos = Final position
- DNQ = Did not qualify
- DNE = Did not enter
- NH = Not Held
- – = Does Not Exist
- R1 = Round 1
- R2 = Round 2
- R3 = Round 3
- R4 = Round 4
- F = Final
- SF = Semi-finals
- QF = Quarter-finals
- R16 = Round of 16
- Group = Group stage
- GS2 = Second Group stage
- QR1 = First Qualifying Round
- QR2 = Second Qualifying Round
- QR3 = Third Qualifying Round
