= Anthony Jin =

Soccer player (born 2007)

Personal information
- Full name: Jin Wenxu
- Date of birth: 4 May 2007 (age 19)
- Place of birth: Yorktown, Virginia, United States
- Height: 1.74 m (5 ft 9 in)
- Position: Defender

Team information
- Current team: Shaanxi Union
- Number: 23

Senior career*
Years	Team	Apps	(Gls)
2025	Chattanooga Red Wolves SC	0	(0)
2026–	Shaanxi Union	12	(0)
- * Club domestic league appearances and goals as of 30 September 2026 ‡ National team caps and goals as of 30 September 2026

Anthony Jin (Chinese: 金文旭; pinyin: Jīn Wénxù; born 4 May 2007) is an American professional soccer player who plays as a defender for China League One club Shaanxi Union.

== Early life and youth career ==
Jin was born on 4 May 2007. He grew up in a highly educated family; his father is a Peking University alumnus and his mother is a NASA astrophysicist.

Jin developed within the American professional football youth system, playing for the youth teams of Sporting Kansas City, the Richmond Kickers, and D.C. United. During this period he won multiple youth tournament honors. In 2024, he was selected to the MLS NEXT Cup U17 Eastern Best XI and scored the first goal for the Eastern team in the All-Star Game. In July 2025, Jin was promoted from the Chattanooga Red Wolves Academy to the Chattanooga Red Wolves first team, competing in USL League One.

== Club career ==
=== Shaanxi Union ===
On 6 March 2026, Shaanxi Union officially announced the signing of Jin Wenxu. He was assigned the number 23 shirt and played as a full-back.

In the 2026 season, Jin started for Shaanxi Union in the China League One. On 25 July 2026, he provided an assist in a 3–0 league victory against Shenzhen Juniors.

On 18 September 2026, Shaanxi Union announced that Jin had signed a contract extension with the club.

== International career ==
On 18 September 2026, the Chinese Football Association announced the squad for the China U19 national team's fourth training camp of the year, which included Jin Wenxu. The training camp was held from 20 September to 5 October 2026 at the National Football Training Base, as part of preparations for the 2027 AFC U-20 Asian Cup.

== Career statistics ==
=== Club ===
As of 30 September 2026

Appearances and goals by club, season and competition
Club	Season	League			National Cup		Continental		Other		Total	
Club	Season	Division	Apps	Goals	Apps	Goals	Apps	Goals	Apps	Goals	Apps	Goals
Shaanxi Union	2026	China League One	11	0	1	0	—		—		12	0
Career total			11	0	1	0	0	0	0	0	12	0
