= Zhong Haoran =

Chinese footballer

Zhong Haoran 钟浩然
Personal information
- Date of birth: 15 July 1994 (age 32)
- Place of birth: Shiyan, Hubei, China
- Height: 1.78 m (5 ft 10 in)
- Position: Midfielder

Team information
- Current team: Shenzhen Juniors
- Number: 6

Youth career
- Hubei Youth

Senior career*
Years	Team	Apps	(Gls)
2011–2012	Hubei Youth	16	(1)
2013–2016	Hunan Billows	13	(0)
2016	Spartak Subotica	1	(0)
2017	Proleter Novi Sad	5	(0)
2018	Borac Čačak	0	(0)
2018–2023	Zhejiang FC	83	(4)
2023–2024	Yunnan Yukun	30	(4)
2025	Meizhou Hakka	26	(1)
2026–	Shenzhen Juniors	0	(0)
- * Club domestic league appearances and goals as of 28 August 2025

Zhong Haoran (Chinese: 钟浩然; pinyin: Zhōng Hàorán; born 15 July 1994) is a Chinese footballer who plays as a midfielder for China League One club Shenzhen Juniors.

== Club career ==
In 2011, Zhong Horan started his professional footballer career with Hubei Youth in the China League Two. In July 2013, Zhong was signed for China League One side Hunan Billows. He played with Hunan Billows mostly with their reserve squad, before moving abroad and signing with Serbian side FK Spartak Subotica in July 2016. He made his debut in the 2016–17 Serbian SuperLiga on 10 September, in the 8th round home game against Javor entering as a substitute in the 68th minute of the game. In summer 2017 Zhong returned to the SuperLiga by joining FK Borac Čačak but made no league appearances in the first half of the season. On 10 February 2018, Zhong transferred to China League One side Zhejiang Greentown. He would make his debut in a league game on 7 April 2018 against Heilongjiang Lava Spring in a 2-1 victory. He would then play a vital part as the club gained promotion to the top tier at the end of the 2021 campaign.

On 25 January 2025, Zhong joined fellow top tier club Meizhou Hakka.

On 7 January 2026, Zhong joined China League One club Shenzhen Juniors.

== Career statistics ==
Statistics accurate as of match played 31 January 2023.

Appearances and goals by club, season and competition
Club	Season	League			National Cup		Continental		Other		Total	
Club	Season	Division	Apps	Goals	Apps	Goals	Apps	Goals	Apps	Goals	Apps	Goals
Hubei Youth	2011	China League Two	0	0	0	0	-		-		0	0
Hubei Youth	2012	China League Two	16	1	0	0	-		-		0	0
Hubei Youth	Total		16	1	0	0	0	0	0	0	16	1
Hunan Billows	2013	China League One	1	0	0	0	-		-		1	0
Hunan Billows	2014	China League One	4	0	0	0	-		-		4	0
Hunan Billows	2015	China League One	8	0	0	0	-		-		8	0
Hunan Billows	Total		13	0	0	0	0	0	0	0	13	0
Spartak Subotica	2016–17	Serbian SuperLiga	1	0	1	0	-		-		2	0
Proleter Novi Sad	2016–17	Serbian First League	5	0	0	0	-		-		5	0
Borac Čačak	2017–18	Serbian First League	0	0	0	0	-		-		0	0
Zhejiang Greentown	2018	China League One	21	0	1	0	-		-		22	0
Zhejiang Greentown	2019	China League One	16	1	2	0	-		-		18	1
Zhejiang Greentown	2020	China League One	12	0	1	0	-		2 (Note: Appearance(s) in CSL Relegation play-offs)	0	15	0
Zhejiang Greentown	2021	China League One	19	3	1	0	-		2	0	22	3
Zhejiang Greentown	2022	Chinese Super League	15	0	4	1	-		-		19	1
Zhejiang Greentown	Total		83	4	9	1	0	0	4	0	96	5
Career total			118	5	10	1	0	0	4	0	132	6

== External sources ==
- Zhong Haoran at WorldFootball.net
- Zhong Haoran at Soccerway
