= Wang Shijie (footballer) =

Chinese footballer (born 2004)

Personal information
- Date of birth: 22 January 2004 (age 22)
- Place of birth: Xiamen, Fujian, China
- Height: 1.67 m (5 ft 6 in)
- Position: Midfielder

Team information
- Current team: Shaanxi Union
- Number: 21

Youth career
- Xiamen Beilei
- Jiangsu Suning
- Evergrande Football School

Senior career*
Years	Team	Apps	(Gls)
2022–2024	Guangzhou FC	44	(3)
2025–	Shaanxi Union	0	(0)
- * Club domestic league appearances and goals as of 14:01, 26 March 2024 (UTC)

Wang Shijie (Chinese: 王世杰; born 22 January 2004) is a Chinese footballer currently playing as a midfielder for Shaanxi Union

== Club career ==
Wang started his career with Jiangsu Suning, before joining the Evergrande Football School. He was promoted to the senior team and made his debut in a Chinese FA Cup game on 16 November 2022 against Sichuan Jiuniu. He had a run of games with the team as the club went through a turbulent period beginning in 2022, suffering financial instability and, ultimately, relegation following the 2022 Chinese Super League campaign, ending their twelve-season stay in the top flight. Wang remained with the team and went on to establish himself as a regular with the club.

== Style of play ==
Wang has drawn comparisons to Japanese footballer Shinji Kagawa for their similar physique and style of play.

== Career statistics ==
As of 26 March 2024.

Appearances and goals by club, season and competition
Club	Season	League			Cup		Continental		Other		Total	
Club	Season	Division	Apps	Goals	Apps	Goals	Apps	Goals	Apps	Goals	Apps	Goals
Guangzhou FC	2022	Chinese Super League	5	0	2	1	0 (Note: Appearances in the AFC Champions League)	0	–		7	1
Guangzhou FC	2023	China League One	25	2	2	1	–		–		27	3
Guangzhou FC	2024	China League One	2	0	0	0	–		–		2	0
Career total			32	2	4	2	0	0	0	0	36	4
