= Zhou Xin (footballer) =

Chinese association football player

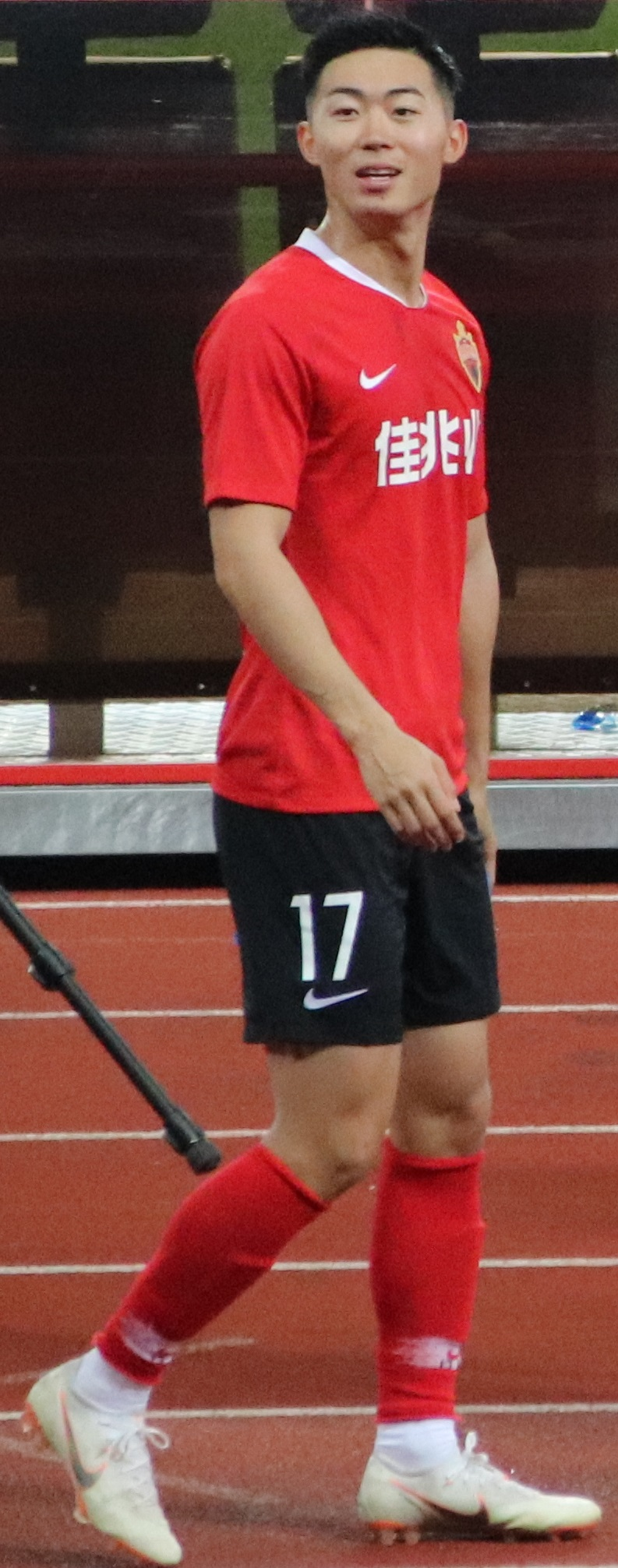

Personal information
- Date of birth: 11 April 1998 (age 28)
- Place of birth: Shenzhen, Guangdong, China
- Height: 1.83 m (6 ft 0 in)
- Position: Defender

Team information
- Current team: Shenzhen Juniors
- Number: 16

Youth career
- –2015: Shenzhen FA
- 2015–2017: Guangzhou Evergrande
- 2016: → Zhuhai Suoka (loan)
- 2017: → Lhasa UCI (loan)
- 2018–2019: Stabæk

Senior career*
Years	Team	Apps	(Gls)
2018–2019	Stabæk II	21	(1)
2019–2023	Shenzhen FC	46	(1)
2022	→ Suzhou Dongwu (loan)	27	(0)
2024–	Shenzhen Juniors	50	(2)
- * Club domestic league appearances and goals as of 8 November 2025

Zhou Xin (Chinese: 周鑫; pinyin: Zhōu Xīn; born 11 April 1998) is a Chinese footballer currently playing as a defender for Shenzhen Juniors.

== Club career ==
Zhou Xin would start his football development in Shenzhen before joining the Guangzhou Evergrande youth team. A move abroad to further his development would see him join Norwegian club Stabæk where he would be promoted to their reserve team Stabæk II, who were allowed to play within the 2. divisjon in the Norwegian pyramid. He would make his senior debut and score his first goal in a league game on 7 May 2018 against Elverum Fotball in a 3-3 draw.

On 26 February 2019 top tier club Shenzhen FC would sign him to play within the 2019 Chinese Super League campaign. He would go on to make his debut for Shenzhen in a league game against Hebei China Fortune on the 2 March 2019 in a 3-1 victory. He would go on to establish himself as a squad player within the team. After three seasons he would be loaned out to second tier club Suzhou Dongwu on 28 April 2022 for the 2022 China League One campaign. At Suzhou he would make his debut for them in a league game on 8 June 2022 against Nantong Zhiyun in a 1-0 defeat.

== Career statistics ==
As of 8 November 2025.

Club	Season	League			Cup		Continental		Other		Total	
Club	Season	Division	Apps	Goals	Apps	Goals	Apps	Goals	Apps	Goals	Apps	Goals
Lhasa UCI	2017	China Amateur Football League	0	0	–		–		2 (Note: Appearance(s) in Promotion/Relegation Play-offs)	0	2	0
Stabæk II	2018	2. divisjon	21	1	0	0	–		–		21	1
Shenzhen FC	2019	Chinese Super League	14	0	1	0	–		–		15	0
Shenzhen FC	2020	Chinese Super League	3	0	1	0	–		–		4	0
Shenzhen FC	2021	Chinese Super League	12	0	2	0	–		–		14	0
Shenzhen FC	2023	Chinese Super League	17	1	1	0	–		–		18	1
Shenzhen FC	Total		46	1	5	0	0	0	0	0	51	1
Suzhou Dongwu (loan)	2022	China League One	27	0	1	0	–		–		28	0
Shenzhen Juniors	2024	China League Two	26	1	1	0	–		–		27	1
Shenzhen Juniors	2025	China League One	24	1	0	0	–		–		24	1
Shenzhen Juniors	Total		50	2	1	0	0	0	0	0	51	2
Career total			144	4	7	0	0	0	2	0	153	4
