= David Pirri =

Spanish footballer and manager

Personal information
- Full name: David Almazán Abril
- Date of birth: 12 February 1974 (age 52)
- Place of birth: Sabadell, Spain
- Height: 1.75 m (5 ft 9 in)
- Position: Midfielder

Team information
- Current team: Shenzhen Juniors (head coach)

Youth career
- 1988–1992: Barcelona

Senior career*
Years	Team	Apps	(Gls)
1992–1993	Barcelona C		
1993–1995	Barcelona B	44	(1)
1995–1999	Mérida	120	(4)
1999–2002	Deportivo La Coruña	0	(0)
1999–2000	→ Las Palmas (loan)	10	(2)
2000–2001	→ Numancia (loan)	24	(0)
2001–2002	→ Sporting Gijón (loan)	32	(4)
2002–2005	Zaragoza	52	(0)
2005–2006	Albacete	17	(0)
2006–2007	Mérida	26	(2)
2007–2008	Sabadell	28	(0)
Total		353	(13)

Managerial career
- 2008–2009: Sabadell (youth)
- 2009–2010: Sabadell
- 2014–2016: Terrassa
- 2017–2021: Shanghai Shenhua U18
- 2022: Bayamón FC
- 2023–2026: China U16
- 2026–: Shenzhen Juniors
- * Club domestic league appearances and goals

David Almazán Abril (born 12 February 1974), known as David Pirri or simply Pirri, is a Spanish retired footballer who played as a midfielder, and a manager who currently manages Shenzhen Juniors in the China League One.

He amassed Segunda División totals of 202 matches and 11 goals over nine seasons, representing mainly Barcelona B. He added 97 scoreless appearances in La Liga, with Mérida, Numancia and Zaragoza.

In 2008, Pirri started working as a manager.

== Playing career ==
Born in Sabadell, Barcelona, Catalonia, Pirri joined FC Barcelona's youth setup in 1988, aged 14. After a brief stint at the C-team he was promoted to the reserves in Segunda División, and made his professional debut with the latter on 6 February 1993, coming on as a second half substitute in a 6–1 home routing of Palamós CF.

Pirri scored his first league goal on 16 October 1994, netting the first in a 2–1 away win against CD Leganés. In the 1995 summer he signed for La Liga club CP Mérida, and made his debut in the competition on 24 September 1995 by playing the full 90 minutes in a 0–1 loss at SD Compostela.

In August 1999, after alternating between the first two major levels, Pirri joined Deportivo de La Coruña, being immediately loaned to UD Las Palmas. He appeared sparingly due to a serious knee injury, as his team returned to the top level after a 12-year absence.

In the 2000 off-season, Pirri moved on loan to CD Numancia in the top flight, appearing regularly but being relegated. In the following year, still owned by Deportivo, he signed with Sporting de Gijón.

In July 2002, Pirri agreed to a two-year contract with second division side Real Zaragoza. He left in 2005 after appearing in only two matches during the campaign, and joined Albacete Balompié.

In August 2006, after a failed trial at Gimnàstic de Tarragona, Pirri moved to Mérida UD from Segunda División B. He signed with fellow league team CE Sabadell FC the following year, and retired with the club in 2008 aged 33.

== Coaching career ==
After his retirement, Pirri was appointed manager of his last club Sabadell's youth setup. On 27 November 2009, after Ramón Moya's dismissal at the helm of the first team, he was named his successor.

In May 2014, Pirri was named coach of Terrassa FC.

On 24 July 2026, Pirri was named the head coach of China League One side Shenzhen Juniors after coaching China U16 for 3 years.

== Personal life ==
Pirri's son Daniel is also a professional footballer currently playing for Hong Kong Premier League club Eastern.

== Honours ==
Mérida

- Segunda División: 1996–97

Las Palmas

- Segunda División: 1999–2000

Zaragoza

- Copa del Rey: 2003–04
