= Shang Yin (footballer) =

Chinese association football player

Personal information
- Date of birth: 23 January 1989 (age 37)
- Place of birth: Shanghai, China
- Height: 1.77 m (5 ft 10 in)
- Positions: Midfielder; forward

Team information
- Current team: Shenzhen Juniors
- Number: 37

Youth career
- –2007: Shanghai United
- 2009–2012: Shanghai Moshidi Aibi F.C. (DIB)

Senior career*
Years	Team	Apps	(Gls)
2013–2014	Shanghai Shenhua	0	(0)
2013	→ Jiangxi Beidamen (loan)		
2015	Hainan Seamen		
2016–2017	Shanghai Sunfun	18	(8)
2018–2020	Sichuan Longfor	43	(15)
2020–2022	Jiangxi Beidamen	45	(11)
2022–2023	Dalian Pro	57	(7)
2024	Liaoning Tieren	15	(0)
2024–2025	Guangdong GZ-Power	43	(3)
2026–	Shenzhen Juniors	0	(0)
- * Club domestic league appearances and goals as of 14:01, 31 December 2025 (UTC)

Shang Yin (Chinese: 商隐; born 23 January 1989) is a Chinese professional footballer who played as a midfielder or forward for Shenzhen Juniors.

== Club career ==
Shang Yin would play for the Shanghai United youth team until the club merged with local rivals Shanghai Shenhua. He would be released due to the enlarged squad size and opened a crayfish shop and a barbecue stall while playing for ametur club Shanghai Moshidi Aibi Football Club (DIB), which is the abbreviation of "Do it better"). One day his club was invited to provide competition for the reserve team of Shanghai Shenhua, where he impressed the club and after being given a trial was offered a professional contract with his boyhood supported club.

Shang would be loaned out to third tier club Jiangxi Beidamen throughout the 2013 China League Two season. On his return to Shenhua he could not break into the senior team and was allowed to leave once his contract ended. He would return to ametur football by joining fourth tier football club Hainan Seamen and helped them come runners-up within the division and promotion to the professional leagues at the end of the 2015 league season. Despite this promotion he returned to Shanghai to join another fourth tier club in Shanghai Sunfun and once again he was able to help his new team gain promotion. This time he remained with the club as the participated within the 2017 China League Two campaign.

On 9 March 2018 he joined another third tier club in Sichuan Longfor before the start of the 2018 China League Two season. He would go on to establish himself as an integral member of the team and helped them win the division title and promotion without losing a single game. The following campaign he would guide the club to finish above the relegation zone, however the club was dissolved after they failed to submit the salary & bonus confirmation form before the 2020 season. On 4 June 2020, he joined second tier Jiangxi Beidamen before the start of the 2020 China League One season. His debut would be a league game on 13 September 2020 against Shaanxi Chang'an Athletic F.C. in a 1-1 draw. Throughout the season he would go on to be vital member of the team and the clubs top goal scorer with seven goals at the end of the season.

On 21 April 2022 he joined top tier club Dalian Pro for the start of the 2022 Chinese Super League season. He would make his top tier league debut on 8 June 2022, aged 33 against Guangzhou City in a game that was initially won by a score of 2-0 but was overturned to a 3-0 defeat after Dalian fielded an ineligible Under 23 years of age player. Despite this disappointment he would still go to establish himself as a vital member of the team and score his first goal for the club in a league game on 12 June 2022 against Changchun Yatai in a 1-1 draw.

On 6 January 2026, Shang joined another China League One club Shenzhen Juniors.

== Career statistics ==
As of 31 December 2025.

Club	Season	League			Cup		Continental		Other		Total	
Club	Season	Division	Apps	Goals	Apps	Goals	Apps	Goals	Apps	Goals	Apps	Goals
Shanghai Shenhua	2013	Chinese Super League	0	0	0	0	–		–		0	0
Shanghai Shenhua	2014	Chinese Super League	0	0	0	0	–		–		0	0
Shanghai Shenhua	Total		0	0	0	0	0	0	0	0	0	0
Jiangxi Beidamen (loan)	2013	China League Two	?	?	–		–		–		?	?
Hainan Seamen	2015	China Amateur Football League	?	?	–		–		–		?	?
Shanghai Sunfun	2016	China Amateur Football League	?	?	–		–		–		?	?
Shanghai Sunfun	2017	China League Two	18	8	1	0	–		–		19	8
Shanghai Sunfun	Total		18	8	1	0	0	0	0	0	19	8
Sichuan Longfor	2018	China League Two	26	12	3	1	–		–		29	13
Sichuan Longfor	2019	China League One	17	3	0	0	–		–		17	3
Sichuan Longfor	Total		43	15	3	1	0	0	0	0	46	16
Jiangxi Beidamen	2020	China League One	14	7	0	0	–		2 (Note: Appearances Promotion/Relegation Play-offs)	0	16	7
Jiangxi Beidamen	2021	China League One	31	4	0	0	–		–		31	4
Jiangxi Beidamen	Total		45	11	0	0	0	0	2	0	47	11
Dalian Professional	2022	Chinese Super League	30	7	1	0	–		–		31	7
Dalian Professional	2023	Chinese Super League	27	0	4	1	–		–		31	1
Dalian Professional	Total		57	7	5	1	0	0	0	0	62	8
Liaoning Tieren	2024	China League One	15	0	0	0	–		–		15	0
Guangdong GZ-Power	2024	China League Two	13	0	0	0	–		–		13	0
Guangdong GZ-Power	2025	China League One	30	3	1	0	–		–		31	3
Guangdong GZ-Power	Total		43	3	1	0	0	0	0	0	44	3
Career total			221	44	10	1	0	0	2	0	233	45
