= Daniel Peñaloza =

Colombian footballer (born 2002)

Personal information
- Full name: Daniel Yecid Peñaloza Cárdenas
- Date of birth: 14 May 2002 (age 24)
- Place of birth: Bogotá, Colombia
- Position: Forward

Team information
- Current team: Tigres F.C.

Senior career*
Years	Team	Apps	(Gls)
2016–2019	Tigres F.C.	20	(4)
- * Club domestic league appearances and goals

Daniel Yecid Peñaloza Cárdenas (born 14 May 2002) known as Daniel Peñaloza is a former Colombian footballer. He played as a forward for Tigres FC in Colombia.

Peñaloza was born in Bogotá. On 30 April 2017, he made his debut for the Tigres F.C. first team against América de Cali in the Categoría Primera A at 14 years old. He replaced thirty-nine-year-old Wilson Carpintero as a substitute in the 80th minute.
