= Han Guanghui =

Chinese footballer

Han Guanghui 한광휘 韩光徽
Personal information
- Date of birth: 24 January 1988 (age 38)
- Place of birth: Yanji, Jilin, China
- Height: 1.83 m (6 ft 0 in)
- Positions: Left winger; left-back

Team information
- Current team: Shenzhen Juniors (assistant coach)

Senior career*
Years	Team	Apps	(Gls)
2008–2015	Beijing BIT	145	(24)
2016–2018	Yanbian FC	52	(1)
2019	Zibo Cuju	17	(2)
2020	Shaanxi Chang'an Athletic	13	(2)
2021–2023	Chengdu Rongcheng	20	(3)
2023	→ Yanbian Longding (loan)	26	(4)
2024	Yanbian Longding	14	(0)
2024–2025	Shenzhen Juniors	24	(1)

Managerial career
- 2026–: Shenzhen Juniors (assistant)
- * Club domestic league appearances and goals as of 1 January 2026

Han Guanghui
- Simplified Chinese: 韩光徽
Transcriptions
Standard Mandarin
- Hanyu Pinyin: Hán Guānghuī
- IPA: [xǎn.kwáŋˈxwéɪ]

Chinese Korean name
- Chosŏn'gŭl: 한광휘
Transcriptions
- Revised Romanization: Han Gwanghwi
- McCune–Reischauer: Han Kwanghwi

Han Guanghui (Chinese: 韩光徽; Korean: 한광휘; born 24 January 1988) is a Chinese former footballer who played for as left winger or left-back.

== Club career ==
Han Guanghui was born in Yanji, Jilin before moving to Beijing to join Beijing BIT during the 2008 season. He was actively encouraged to by his club to finish his degree in International trade while participating in the second tier of the Chinese pyramid. After eight seasons he would establish himself as a vital member of the team until at the end of the 2015 China League One season the club was relegated and Han was allowed to leave.

Han would return to Jilin to join top tier club Yanbian FC on 13 January 2016. On 8 May 2016, he made his debut for Yanbian in the 2016 Chinese Super League against Changchun Yatai, coming on as a substitute for Kim Seung-dae in the 92nd minute. He would score his first goal for the club on 11 May 2016 in a Chinese FA Cup game against Lijiang Jiayunhao that ended in a 1-1 draw before being settled on penalties, which Yanbian lost. At the end of the 2017 Chinese Super League season Yanbian were relegated, Han remained loyal and stayed with the club.

On 26 February 2019, Yanbian was dissolved due to owing taxes and Han was allowed to join third tier club Zibo Cuju. The following season he would join second tier club Shaanxi Chang'an Athletic. After only one season Han moved to another second tier club Chengdu Rongcheng where he would establish himself as a regular within the team and aid them to promotion at the end of the 2021 league campaign.

On 9 November 2025, Han decided to retire from professional football after the 2025 season.

== Career statistics ==
Statistics accurate as of match played 1 January 2026.

Appearances and goals by club, season and competition
Club	Season	League			National Cup		Continental		Other		Total	
Club	Season	Division	Apps	Goals	Apps	Goals	Apps	Goals	Apps	Goals	Apps	Goals
Beijing BIT	2008	China League One	3	0	-		-		-		3	0
Beijing BIT	2009	China League One	6	1	-		-		-		6	1
Beijing BIT	2010	China League One	9	1	-		-		-		9	1
Beijing BIT	2011	China League One	19	1	1	0	-		-		20	1
Beijing BIT	2012	China League One	29	7	1	0	-		-		30	7
Beijing BIT	2013	China League One	30	6	0	0	-		-		30	6
Beijing BIT	2014	China League One	29	5	2	0	-		-		31	5
Beijing BIT	2015	China League One	20	3	1	1	-		-		21	4
Beijing BIT	Total		145	24	5	1	0	0	0	0	150	24
Yanbian FC	2016	Chinese Super League	4	0	1	1	-		-		5	1
Yanbian FC	2017	Chinese Super League	23	0	1	1	-		-		24	1
Yanbian FC	2018	China League One	25	1	0	0	-		-		25	1
Yanbian FC	Total		52	1	2	2	0	0	0	0	54	3
Zibo Cuju	2019	China League Two	17	2	0	0	-		-		17	2
Shaanxi Chang'an Athletic	2020	China League One	13	2	-		-		-		13	2
Chengdu Rongcheng	2021	China League One	17	3	0	0	-		0 (Note: Appearance(s) in CSL Relegation play-offs)	0	17	3
Chengdu Rongcheng	2022	Chinese Super League	3	0	2	0	-		-		5	0
Chengdu Rongcheng	Total		20	3	2	0	0	0	0	0	22	3
Yanbian Longding (loan)	2023	China League One	26	4	0	0	-		-		26	4
Yanbian Longding	2024	China League One	14	0	0	0	-		-		14	0
Shenzhen Juniors	2024	China League Two	16	1	0	0	-		-		16	1
Shenzhen Juniors	2025	China League One	8	0	2	0	-		-		10	0
Shenzhen Juniors	Total		24	1	2	0	0	0	0	0	26	1
Career total			311	36	11	3	0	0	0	0	322	39
