= Xu Junchi =

Chinese footballer (born 2005)

Personal information
- Date of birth: 9 January 2005 (age 21)
- Place of birth: Wenzhou, Zhejiang, China
- Height: 1.76 m (5 ft 9 in)
- Position: Defender

Team information
- Current team: Zhejiang FC
- Number: 25

Youth career
- Zhejiang Greentown

Senior career*
Years	Team	Apps	(Gls)
2023–	Zhejiang FC	25	(0)
2024–2025	→ Shijiazhuang Gongfu (loan)	32	(1)

International career^{‡}
2024–2025	China U20	5	(0)
2026–	China U23	2	(0)
- * Club domestic league appearances and goals as of 19 November 2026 ‡ National team caps and goals as of 2 July 2026

Xu Junchi (simplified Chinese: 徐俊驰; traditional Chinese: 徐俊馳; pinyin: Xú Jùnchí; born 9 January 2005) is a Chinese professional footballer who plays as a defender for Chinese Super League club Zhejiang FC.

== Early life and youth career ==
Xu was born on 9 January 2005 in Yongjia, Wenzhou, Zhejiang. Due to his father's business, Xu grew up in Kunming from a young age. He began playing football in primary school when a coach spotted his potential. Within six months, he progressed from his school team to the Kunming city team.

Xu joined the youth academy of Zhejiang Greentown. In November 2022, he was part of the Zhejiang U17A team that won the inaugural China Youth Football League U17 championship.

== Club career ==
=== Zhejiang FC ===
In April 2023, Xu was promoted to the first team of Zhejiang FC. In February 2024, he was moved back to the Zhejiang U19 team. He had not made any first-team appearances for Zhejiang FC at that time.

=== Shijiazhuang Gongfu (loan) ===
On 20 June 2024, Shijiazhuang Gongfu officially announced the signing of Xu on loan from Zhejiang FC, along with teammate Ablikim Abdusalam. In the 2024 season, Xu made 12 appearances across all competitions for Shijiazhuang Gongfu, with 11 starts, and provided one assist.

On 10 February 2025, he had joined Shijiazhuang Gongfu on loan from Zhejiang FC, with the loan period until the end of 2025. On 24 February 2025, Shijiazhuang Gongfu officially announced the renewal of Xu's loan for one season.

On 16 March 2025, Xu scored his first career goal in the opening match of the 2025 China League One season, a 2–2 away draw against Jiangxi Dingnan United. In the 2025 season, Xu made 21 appearances in the China League One for Shijiazhuang Gongfu, with 20 starts, totalling 1,789 minutes, and contributed one goal and five assists.

On 9 March 2026, Shijiazhuang Gongfu announced that Xu had returned to Zhejiang FC upon the expiration of his loan contract. During his time at Shijiazhuang Gongfu, Xu made a total of 32 appearances, scoring one goal and providing six assists.

=== Return to Zhejiang FC ===
In the 2026 season, Xu was included in the first-team squad of Zhejiang FC for the Chinese Super League. He wears the number 25 jersey.

== International career ==
In 2024, Xu was called up to the China U19 national team for training camps and friendly matches against Myanmar. In the Four Nations Tournament, he made three appearances for China U19, with two substitute appearances and one start.

On 1 June 2024, in the second friendly match against Myanmar U19, Xu started as right-back and provided an assist for Ning Fangze's goal in the 62nd minute, helping China U19 to a 3–1 victory.

In February 2025, Xu was named in the China U20 squad for the 2025 AFC U-20 Asian Cup held in Shenzhen. On 18 February 2025, in the final group match against Australia U20, Xu started as right-back. In the 29th minute, he provided an assist from the right flank for Kuai Jiwen's goal, though China U20 lost the match 1–2.

== Career statistics ==
=== Club ===
As of 2 July 2026

Appearances and goals by club, season and competition
Club	Season	League			National Cup		Continental		Other		Total	
Club	Season	Division	Apps	Goals	Apps	Goals	Apps	Goals	Apps	Goals	Apps	Goals
Zhejiang FC	2026	Chinese Super League	13	0	0	0	—		—		13	0
Shijiazhuang Gongfu (loan)	2024	China League One	11	0	0	0	—		—		11	0
Shijiazhuang Gongfu (loan)	2025	China League One	21	1	0	0	—		—		21	1
Career total			45	1	0	0	0	0	0	0	45	1

== Honours ==
Zhejiang U17

- China Youth Football League U17: 2022
