= Shahsat Hujahmat =

Chinese footballer (born 2006)

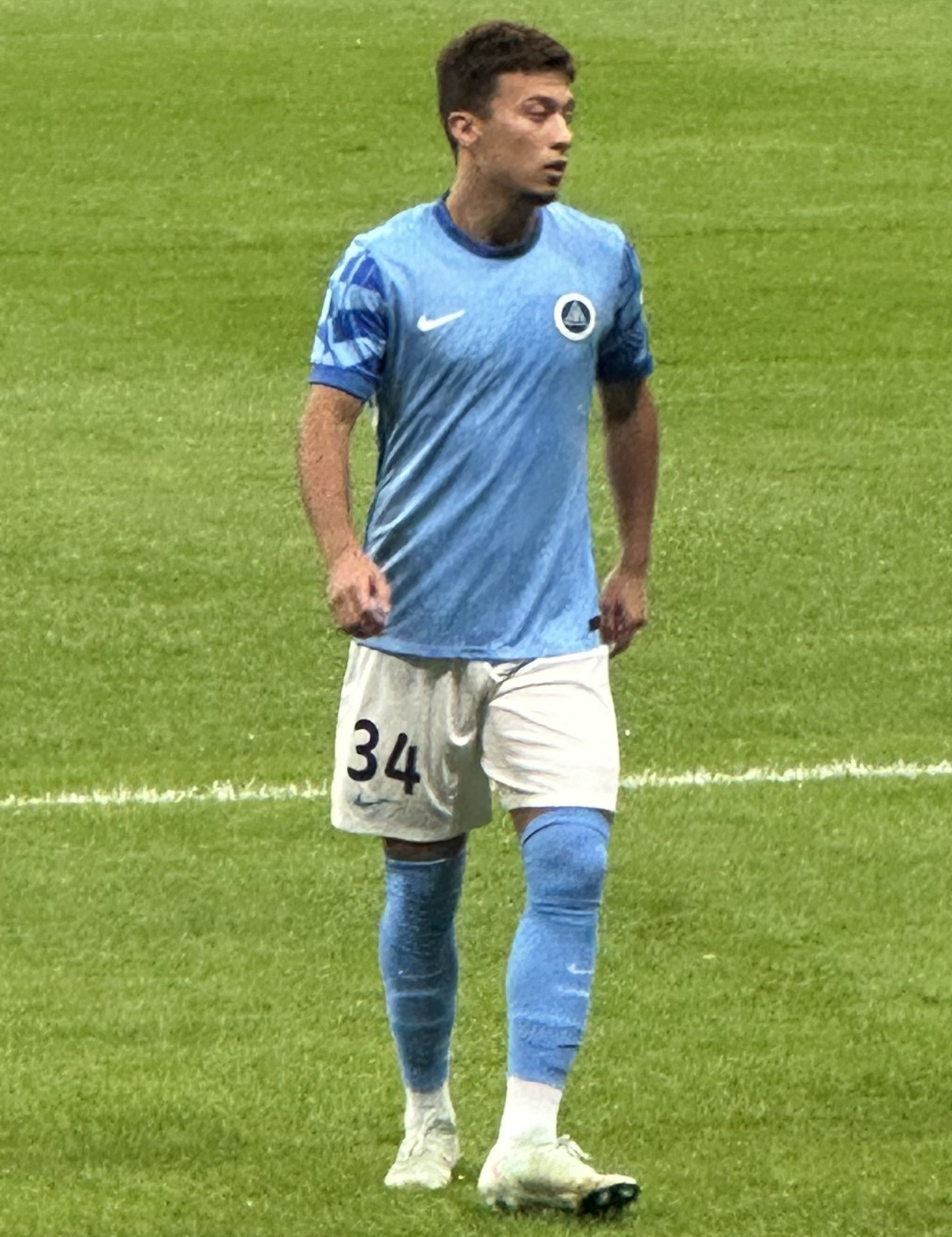
- Shahsat in May 2025

Personal information
- Date of birth: 7 July 2006 (age 20)
- Place of birth: Yining, Xinjiang, China
- Height: 1.79 m (5 ft 10 in)
- Positions: Midfielder; forward

Team information
- Current team: Shaanxi Union (on loan from Shenzhen Peng City)
- Number: 34

Youth career
- Shenzhen FC

Senior career*
Years	Team	Apps	(Gls)
2022–2023	Shenzhen FC	35	(3)
2024	Heilongjiang Ice City	8	(1)
2024–	Shenzhen Peng City	17	(0)
2026–	→ Shaanxi Union (loan)	0	(0)

International career
2019–2021	China U17		
2022–	China U19		
- * Club domestic league appearances and goals as of 22 November 2025

Shahsat Hujahmat (Chinese: 夏合扎提·吾加合买提; pinyin: Xiàhézhātí·Wújiāhémǎití; born 7 July 2006) is a Chinese professional footballer who plays as a forward or midfielder for China League One club Shaanxi Union, on loan from Shenzhen Peng City. He holds the record for being the youngest goalscorer in the history of the Chinese Super League, aged 16 years and 283 days.

== Club career ==
Born in Yining, Xinjiang, Shahsat started his career in the Shenzhen academy. He was promoted to the first team at the end of August 2022, and became the first player born in 2006 to play in the Chinese Super League when he made his debut the following month, on 20 September 2022 against Wuhan Yangtze River in a 3-0 victory. He recorded his first assist for Shenzhen on 15 December 2022, helping his side to a 4–2 win over Guangzhou FC.

On 16 April 2023, in the first game of the 2023 Chinese Super League season for Shenzhen, he scored a penalty against Qingdao Hainiu, becoming the youngest goalscorer in the history of the Chinese Super League.

On 26 June 2026, Shahsat was loaned to China League One club Shaanxi Union for the rest of 2026 season.

== International career ==
Shahsat has represented China from under-15 to under-19 level.

== Career statistics ==
As of match played 22 November 2025.

Appearances and goals by club, season and competition
Club	Season	League			Cup		Continental		Other		Total	
Club	Season	Division	Apps	Goals	Apps	Goals	Apps	Goals	Apps	Goals	Apps	Goals
Shenzhen	2022	Chinese Super League	11	0	1	0	–		–		12	0
Shenzhen	2023	Chinese Super League	24	3	1	1	–		–		25	4
Shenzhen	Total		35	3	2	1	0	0	0	0	35	4
Heilongjiang Ice City	2024	China League One	8	1	1	0	–		–		9	1
Shenzhen Peng City	2024	Chinese Super League	2	0	1	0	–		–		3	0
Shenzhen Peng City	2025	Chinese Super League	8	0	0	0	–		–		8	0
Shenzhen Peng City	Total		10	0	1	0	0	0	0	0	11	0
Career total			53	4	4	1	0	0	0	0	57	5
