= Wang Yifan =

Chinese footballer

Personal information
- Date of birth: 2 February 1999 (age 27)
- Height: 1.85 m (6 ft 1 in)
- Position: Forward

Team information
- Current team: Henan Jianye
- Number: 47

Senior career*
| Years | Team | Apps | (Gls) |
| 2019– | Henan Jianye | 3 | (0) |
- * Club domestic league appearances and goals as of 14:01, 31 December 2022 (UTC)

Wang Yifan (Chinese: 王一凡; born 2 February 1999) is a Chinese footballer currently playing as a forward for Henan Jianye.

== Club career ==
Wang Yifan was promoted to the senior team of Henan Jianye during the 2019 Chinese Super League season and made his debut in a league game on 9 March 2019 against Shandong Luneng Taishan F.C. The match ended in a 2-2 draw where he came on as a substitute for Yang Kuo.

== Career statistics ==
As of 31 December 2022.

Appearances and goals by club, season and competition
| Club | Season | League | | | National Cup | | Continental | | Other | | Total | |
| Club | Season | Division | Apps | Goals | Apps | Goals | Apps | Goals | Apps | Goals | Apps | Goals |
|---|---|---|---|---|---|---|---|---|---|---|---|---|
| Henan Jianye | 2019 | Chinese Super League | 3 | 0 | 1 | 0 | – | | – | | 4 | 0 |
| Career total | | | 3 | 0 | 1 | 0 | 0 | 0 | 0 | 0 | 4 | 0 |
