= Han Dong (footballer) =

Chinese footballer

Personal information
- Date of birth: 2 March 2001 (age 25)
- Place of birth: Kaifeng, Henan, China
- Height: 1.80 m (5 ft 11 in)
- Position: Forward

Team information
- Current team: Shijiazhuang Gongfu (on loan from Henan FC)
- Number: 11

Senior career*
Years	Team	Apps	(Gls)
2019–	Henan FC	28	(2)
2024	→ Hunan Billows (loan)	11	(1)
2026–	→ Shijiazhuang Gongfu (loan)	0	(0)

International career^{‡}
2019	China U18	2	(0)
- * Club domestic league appearances and goals as of 20:44, 31 December 2022 (UTC) ‡ National team caps and goals as of 14:01, 8 December 2019 (UTC)

Han Dong (simplified Chinese: 韩东; traditional Chinese: 韓東; pinyin: Hán Dōng; born 2 March 2001) is a Chinese footballer currently playing as a forward for Shijiazhuang Gongfu, on loan from Henan FC.

== Club career ==
Han Dong was promoted to the senior team of Henan Jianye (now known as Henan FC) within the 2019 Chinese Super League season and would make his debut in a Chinese FA Cup game on 1 May 2019 against Guangzhou Evergrande in a 2-0 defeat where he came on as a substitute for Wang Yifan. This would eventually be followed by his first league appearance on 1 December 2019 against Guangzhou R&F in a 1-0 victory.

== Career statistics ==
As of 31 December 2022.

Club	Season	League			Cup		Continental		Other		Total	
Club	Season	Division	Apps	Goals	Apps	Goals	Apps	Goals	Apps	Goals	Apps	Goals
Henan Jianye/ Henan	2019	Chinese Super League	1	0	1	0	–		–		2	0
Henan Jianye/ Henan	2020	Chinese Super League	0	0	0	0	–		–		0	0
Henan Jianye/ Henan	2021	Chinese Super League	13	0	5	2	–		–		18	2
Henan Jianye/ Henan	2022	Chinese Super League	14	2	1	0	–		–		15	2
Henan Jianye/ Henan	Total		28	2	7	2	0	0	0	0	35	4
Career total			28	2	7	2	0	0	0	0	35	4
