= Su Yuliang =

Chinese association football player

Personal information
- Date of birth: 26 January 2005 (age 21)
- Place of birth: Guangzhou, Guangdong, China
- Height: 1.82 m (6 ft 0 in)
- Position: Forward

Team information
- Current team: Shenzhen Juniors
- Number: 19

Youth career
- 2016: Atlético Madrid
- 2016–2021: Guangzhou City
- 2023–: Grafičar Beograd

Senior career*
| Years | Team | Apps | (Gls) |
| 2021–2023 | Guangzhou City | 4 | (0) |
| 2023–2025 | Grafičar Beograd | 3 | (0) |
| 2025– | Shenzhen Juniors | 0 | (0) |

International career
| 2020 | China U16 | | |
| 2024 | China U19 | | |
- * Club domestic league appearances and goals as of 20:56, 4 August 2023 (UTC)

Su Yuliang (Chinese: 苏宇亮; born 26 January 2005) is a Chinese footballer who plays as a forward for Chinese club Shenzhen Juniors. He is nicknamed the 'Chinese Mbappé' for his similarities to Kylian Mbappé.

== Club career ==
Su was selected as one of fifty young Chinese footballers to join the academy of Spanish side Atlético Madrid, as part of Wanda Group's "China Football Hope Star" initiative to encourage the development of young Chinese footballers.

On his return to China, he joined the academy of Guangzhou City. He progressed through the club's youth ranks, making his debut in the 2021 Chinese Super League, in a game against Chengdu Rongcheng.

In February 2023, he went on trial with Serbian side Red Star Belgrade. Having left Guangzhou City, he joined Red Star Belgrade affiliate club Grafičar on 4 August 2023.

In June 2025, Su returned to China and joined China League One club Shenzhen Juniors.

== Personal life ==
Su was born in Guangzhou to a Chinese mother and Nigerian father.

== Career statistics ==
As of 20 February 2023.

Appearances and goals by club, season and competition
| Club | Season | League | | | Cup (Note: Includes Chinese FA Cup and Serbian Cup) | | Continental | | Other | | Total | |
| Club | Season | Division | Apps | Goals | Apps | Goals | Apps | Goals | Apps | Goals | Apps | Goals |
|---|---|---|---|---|---|---|---|---|---|---|---|---|
| Guangzhou City | 2021 | Chinese Super League | 1 | 0 | 1 | 0 | – | | – | | 2 | 0 |
| Guangzhou City | 2022 | Chinese Super League | 3 | 0 | 2 | 0 | – | | – | | 5 | 0 |
| Guangzhou City | Total | | 4 | 0 | 3 | 0 | 0 | 0 | 0 | 0 | 7 | 0 |
| Grafičar | 2023–24 | Serbian First League | 0 | 0 | 0 | 0 | – | | 0 | 0 | 0 | 0 |
| Career total | | | 4 | 0 | 3 | 0 | 0 | 0 | 0 | 0 | 7 | 0 |
