= Chen Yuhao =

Chinese association football player

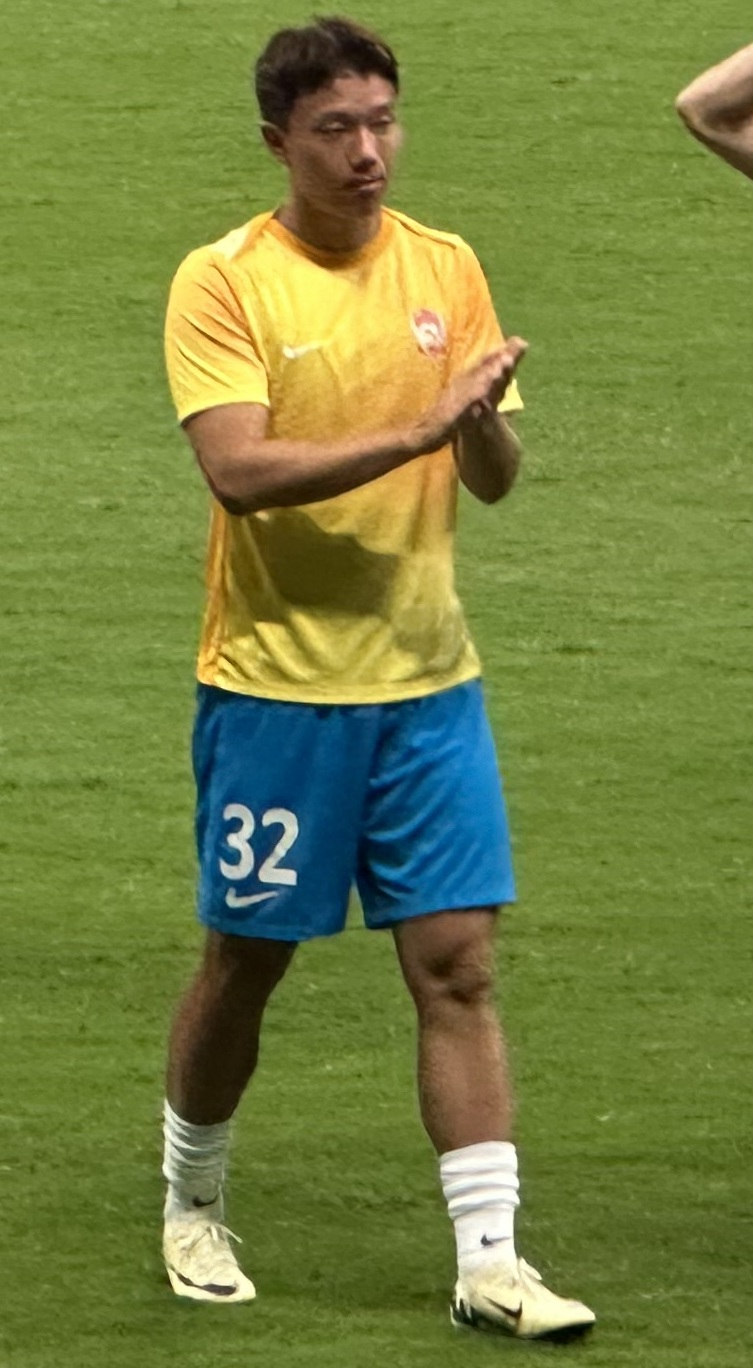
- Chen Yuhao in June 2025

Personal information
- Date of birth: 15 November 2001 (age 24)
- Place of birth: Kunming, Yunnan, China
- Height: 1.77 m (5 ft 10 in)
- Position: Full-back

Team information
- Current team: Shenzhen Juniors (on loan from Yunnan Yukun)
- Number: 2

Youth career
- –2017: Dalian Transcendence
- 2018–2019: Zhejiang Yiteng
- 2019: → Wuhan Zall (youth loan)

Senior career*
Years	Team	Apps	(Gls)
2019–2021	Zhejiang Yiteng	0	(0)
2019	→ Wuhan Zall (loan)	0	(0)
2020	→ China U19 (loan)	4	(0)
2020	→ China U20 (loan)	0	(0)
2021–2022	Wuhan Yangtze River	44	(1)
2023–2025	Wuhan Three Towns	10	(0)
2024–2025	→ Qingdao West Coast (loan)	15	(0)
2025	→ Yunnan Yukun (loan)	4	(0)
2026–	Yunnan Yukun	1	(0)
2026–	→ Shenzhen Juniors (loan)	0	(0)

International career^{‡}
2018	China U16	4	(0)
2019	China U18	2	(0)
2023–2024	China U23	5	(0)
- * Club domestic league appearances and goals as of 26 August 2025 ‡ National team caps and goals as of 14:01, 25 July 2021 (UTC)

Chen Yuhao (simplified Chinese: 陈宇浩; traditional Chinese: 陳宇浩; pinyin: Chén Yǔhào; born 15 November 2001) is a Chinese footballer currently playing as a full-back for Shenzhen Juniors, on loan from Yunnan Yukun.

== Club career ==
On 13 July 2018, Chen Yuhao joined Zhejiang Yiteng (later renamed as Shaoxing Keqiao Yuejia). He would be promoted to the senior team within the 2019 China League Two season and go on to make his debut on 17 April 2019 in a Chinese FA Cup game against Shanghai Jiading Boji in a 1-0 defeat. In the following season he would be loaned out to top tier club Wuhan Zall and then the China U19 team who were allowed to participate within the Chinese pyramid in the 2020 China League Two campaign.

On 5 July 2021 he would join top tier club Wuhan FC for the start of the 2021 Chinese Super League campaign. He would make his debut in a league game on 19 July 2021 against Shanghai Port in a 0-0 draw. He would go on to establish himself as a regular within the team and in the following season he would go on to score his first goal in a league game against Dalian Professional on 23 December 2022 in a 3-0 victory. Unfortunately at the end of the 2022 Chinese Super League season, Wuhan were relegated. On 25 January 2023, the club announced that it had dissolved due to financial difficulties.

On 4 April 2023 he would join fellow top tier club Wuhan Three Towns for the start of the 2023 Chinese Super League campaign.

On 3 January 2026, Chen transferred to Yunnan Yukun permanently.

On 18 June 2026, Chen was loaned to China League One side Shenzhen Juniors for the rest of 2026 season.

== Career statistics ==
As of 4 April 2023.

Club	Season	League			Cup		Continental		Other		Total	
Club	Season	Division	Apps	Goals	Apps	Goals	Apps	Goals	Apps	Goals	Apps	Goals
Shaoxing Keqiao Yuejia	2019	China League Two	0	0	1	0	–		–		1	0
Shaoxing Keqiao Yuejia	2020	China League Two	0	0	0	0	–		–		0	0
Shaoxing Keqiao Yuejia	Total		0	0	1	0	0	0	0	0	1	0
Wuhan Zall (Loan)	2019	Chinese Super League	0	0	0	0	–		–		0	0
China U19 (Loan)	2020	China League Two	4	0	–		–		–		4	0
China U20 (Loan)	2021	China League Two	0	0	0	0	–		–		0	0
Wuhan Yangtze River	2021	Chinese Super League	16	0	4	0	–		–		20	0
Wuhan Yangtze River	2022	Chinese Super League	28	1	1	0	–		–		29	1
Wuhan Yangtze River	Total		44	1	5	0	0	0	0	0	49	1
Wuhan Three Towns	2023	Chinese Super League	0	0	0	0	0	0	0	0	0	0
Career total			48	1	6	0	0	0	0	0	54	1
