= Shenzhen Juniors F.C. =

Chinese professional football club

Shenzhen Juniors
- Full name: Shenzhen Juniors Football club 深圳青年人足球俱乐部
- Founded: 19 June 2022; 4 years ago
- Ground: Bao'an Stadium
- Capacity: 44,050
- Chairman: Li Chunhao
- Manager: David Pirri
- League: China League One
- 2025: China League One, 14th of 16
Home colours	Away colours

Shenzhen Juniors Football Club (simplified Chinese: 深圳青年人足球俱乐部; traditional Chinese: 深圳青年人足球俱樂部; pinyin: Shēnzhèn Qīngniánrén Zúqiú Jùlèbù) is a Chinese professional football club based in Shenzhen, Guangdong, that competes in China League One, the second tier of Chinese football. Shenzhen Juniors plays its home matches at the Longhua Cultural and Sports Center, located within Longhua District.

== History ==
Founded in June 2022, Shenzhen Juniors were the champions of the Shenzhen Super League in the same year, to book a place in the 2023 CMCL.

Led by Zhang Jun, Shenzhen Juniors were victorious in all five matches in the group stage and were qualified for the 2023 CMCL final round, where they were drawn into group A. On 14 October 2023, after defeating Xi'an Chongde Ronghai 1–0 on the last matchday to top their group unbeaten, Shenzhen Juniors secured promotion to China League Two, the Chinese third-tier. As winners of the group, they were placed into a two-legged tie against the group B winners to decide the champions of the 2023 CMCL. In the two-legged final, Shenzhen Juniors drew 1–1 on both occasions, but lost out on penalties to Langfang Glory City to settle for second place.

== Players ==
=== First-team squad ===
As of July 2026

Note: Flags indicate national team as defined under FIFA eligibility rules; some limited exceptions apply. Players may hold more than one non-FIFA nationality.

No.	Pos.	Nation	Player
1	GK	CHN	Mai Gaoling
2	DF	CHN	Chen Yuhao (on loan from Yunnan Yukun)
6	MF	CHN	Zhong Haoran
10	MF	CHN	Xie Baoxian
11	FW	CHN	Huang Kaijun (on loan from Hubei Istar)
13	DF	CHN	Sun Qihan
14	DF	CHN	Huang Jiajun
15	MF	CHN	Su Yuanjie
16	MF	CHN	Zhou Xin
17	FW	CHN	Hu Ming
18	MF	CHN	Shi Yucheng
19	FW	CHN	Su Yuliang
20	DF	SRB	Rade Dugalić
21	MF	CHN	Chen Yajun

No.	Pos.	Nation	Player
23	GK	CHN	Cheng Yuelei
24	DF	HKG	Leung Nok Hang
25	FW	BRA	Rodrigo Henrique
27	FW	CHN	Zhao Shijie
28	FW	CHN	Liu Xiaolong
29	FW	CHN	Lin Zefeng
30	MF	CHN	Gan Xianhao
31	GK	CHN	Chen Zirong
32	FW	CHN	Zhu Guantao
33	MF	CHN	Zhao Yingjie
37	MF	CHN	Shang Yin
38	FW	ENG	Joel Nouble
39	DF	CHN	Zheng Zhiming
41	GK	CHN	Liu Haoran (on loan from Shanghai Shenhua)
42	FW	CHN	Wang Zhicheng (on loan from Hubei Istar)

=== Out on loan ===
Note: Flags indicate national team as defined under FIFA eligibility rules; some limited exceptions apply. Players may hold more than one non-FIFA nationality.

No.	Pos.	Nation	Player
—	DF	CHN	Zeng Yuming (at (China) Tai'an Tiankuang until 31 December 2026)
—	FW	CHN	Gao Kanghao (at (China) Guangzhou Dandelion until 31 December 2026)
—	FW	CHN	Lu Jingsen (at (China) Guangzhou Dandelion until 31 December 2026)

No.	Pos.	Nation	Player
—	FW	CHN	Yang Youxian (at (China) Guizhou Guiyang Athletic until 31 December 2026)
—	MF	CHN	Ke Yuan (at (China) Lanzhou Longyuan Athletic until 31 December 2026)
—	MF	CHN	Chen Weiqi (at (China) Guangzhou Dandelion until 31 December 2026)

=== Management ===
Position	Staff
Head coach	(Spain) David Pirri
Assistant coaches	(China) Wen Chao
Assistant coaches	(China) Han Guanghui
Assistant coaches	(China) Ren Peng
Assistant coach	(Spain) Jaime Paz
Team manager	(China) Li Chunhao
Vice team manager	(China) Mai Sijing

== Managerial history ==
From	To	Name	Sources
2022	23 December 2025	(China) Zhang Jun	
23 December 2025	14 July 2026	(Spain) Ramiro Amarelle	
24 July 2026	present	(Spain) David Pirri	

== Honours ==
League

- CMCL
  - Runners-up: 2023
- Shenzhen Super League
  - Champions: 2022
