= Guangzhou Dandelion F.C. =

Association football club in China

Guangzhou Dandelion
- Full name: Guangzhou Dandelion Football Club 广州蒲公英足球俱乐部
- Ground: Zengcheng Stadium
- Capacity: 12,000
- Manager: Kenichi Uemura
- League: China League Two
- 2025: China League Two, 11th of 24

Guangzhou Dandelion Football Club (simplified Chinese: 广州蒲公英足球俱乐部; traditional Chinese: 廣州蒲公英足球俱樂部; pinyin: Guǎngzhōu Púgōngyīng Zúqiú Jùlèbù) is a Chinese professional football club based in Guangzhou, Guangdong, that competes in China League Two, the third tier of Chinese football.

== History ==
logo of Guangzhou Alpha used between 2020 and 2024

Guangzhou Alpha F.C. had close ties with Guangzhou R&F Football Club, serving as one of its satellite teams. The club adopted R&F's training philosophy and tactical style. Although officially established in 2013, Guangzhou Alpha began its transformation into a competitive team in 2019.
