= 2018 China League Two =

China League Two
- Season: 2018
- Champions: Sichuan Longfor
- Promoted: Sichuan Longfor; Nantong Zhiyun; Shaanxi Chang'an Athletic
- Matches: 377
- Goals: 964 (2.56 per match)
- Top goalscorer: Wang Feike (15 goals)
- Biggest home win: Sichuan Longfor 9–0 Shanghai Sunfun (25 August 2018)
- Biggest away win: Yanbian Beiguo 0–5 Jiangsu Yancheng Dingli (6 May 2018); Shanghai Sunfun 1–6 Sichuan Longfor (19 May 2018); Shanghai Sunfun 1–6 Hunan Billows (1 September 2018)
- Highest scoring: Sichuan Longfor 9–0 Shanghai Sunfun (25 August 2018)
- Longest winning run: 16 matches Sichuan Longfor
- Longest unbeaten run: 24 matches Sichuan Longfor
- Longest winless run: 12 matches Baotou Nanjiao; Yunnan Flying Tigers
- Longest losing run: 12 matches Baotou Nanjiao

The 2018 Chinese Football Association Division Two League season was the 29th season since its establishment in 1989. The league is expanded to 28 teams, with 14 teams in North Group and 14 teams in South Group.

On 11 July 2018, Anhui Hefei Guiguan and Shenyang Dongjin failed to register for the rest of the season due to salary arrears.

== Team changes ==
=== To League Two ===
Teams relegated from 2017 China League One

- Baoding Yingli ETS
- Yunnan Lijiang

Teams promoted from 2017 China Amateur Football League

- Zibo Sunday
- Anhui Hefei Guiguan
- Yanbian Beiguo
- Fujian Tianxin
- Shenzhen Pengcheng
- Sichuan Jiuniu

=== From League Two ===
Teams promoted to 2018 China League One

- Heilongjiang Lava Spring
- Meixian Techand

=== Team withdrawal ===
- ~~Chengdu Qbao~~
- ~~Shanghai JuJu Sports~~

=== Name changes ===
- Yunnan Lijiang F.C. changed their name to Yunnan Flying Tigers in January 2018.

== Clubs ==
=== Stadiums and Locations ===
Groups	Club	Head coach	City	Stadium	Capacity	2017 season
North	Baoding Yingli ETS ^{R}	(China) Han Yalin	Baoding	Hebei University Stadium	20,000	CL1, 15th
North	Yinchuan Helanshan	(China) Fan Yuhong	Yinchuan	Helan Mountain Stadium	39,872	3rd
North	Yinchuan Helanshan	(China) Fan Yuhong	Yinchuan	Wuzhong Yellow River Cultural and Sports Center	N/A	3rd
North	Qingdao Jonoon	(Serbia) Aleksandar Kristić	Qingdao	Qingdao Tiantai Stadium	20,525	5th
North	Qingdao Jonoon	(Serbia) Aleksandar Kristić	Qingdao	Jimo Powerise District Sports Center	N/A	5th
North	Shaanxi Chang'an Athletic	(China) Xie Yuxin	Xi'an	Shaanxi Province Stadium	50,000	7th
North	Shaanxi Chang'an Athletic	(China) Xie Yuxin	Xi'an	Weinan Sports Center Stadium	N/A	7th
North	Hebei Elite	(China) Zhang Hui	Qinhuangdao	Chinese Football School Stadium	N/A	9th
North	Shenyang Urban	(China) Wang Gang	Shenyang	Shenyang Urban Construction University Stadium	12,000	12th
North	Jiangsu Yancheng Dingli	(China) Wang Hongwei	Yancheng	Dafeng Olympic Sports Centre	10,000	13th
North	Beijing BIT	(Spain) Asier Eizaguirre	Beijing	BIT Eastern Athletic Field	5,000	15th
North	Dalian Boyoung	(China) Jiang Feng	Dalian	Jinzhou Stadium	30,775	17th
North	Jilin Baijia	(Serbia) Zoran Kitanoski	Changchun	Development Area Stadium	25,000	20th
North	Jilin Baijia	(Serbia) Zoran Kitanoski	Changchun	Kalun Lake Stadium	N/A	20th
North	Baotou Nanjiao	(Serbia) Branko Božović	Baotou	Baotou Olympic Sports Centre Stadium	40,545	23rd
North	~~Shenyang Dongjin~~	(Serbia) Marjan Živković	Shenyang	Shenyang Urban Construction University Stadium	12,000	24th
North	Zibo Sunday ^{P}	(China) Hou Zhiqiang	Zibo	Zibo Sports Center Stadium	45,000	CAL, 1st
North	Yanbian Beiguo ^{P}	(South Korea) Choi Jin-han	Hunchun	Hunchun People's Stadium	18,900	CAL, 5th
South	Yunnan Flying Tigers ^{R}	(China) Huang Yan	Lijiang	Lijiang Sports Development Centre Stadium	22,400	CL1, 16th
South	Shenzhen Ledman	(China) Li Yuanping (caretaker)	Shenzhen	Bao'an Stadium	40,000	4th
South	Sichuan Longfor	(China) Li Bing	Dujiangyan	Dujiangyan Phoenix Stadium	12,700	6th
South	Nantong Zhiyun	(China) Wei Xin	Rugao	Rugao Olympic Sports Center	15,000	8th
South	Suzhou Dongwu	(Japan) Kazuo Uchida	Suzhou	Suzhou Sports Center	35,000	11th
South	Suzhou Dongwu	(Japan) Kazuo Uchida	Suzhou	Changshu Stadium	30,000	11th
South	Jiangxi Liansheng	(Croatia) Kazimir Vulić	Ruichang	Ruichang Sports Park Stadium	N/A	14th
South	Hunan Billows	(China) Sun Wei	Changsha (playing in Yiyang)	Yiyang Olympic Sports Park Stadium	30,000	16th
South	Shanghai Sunfun	(China) Zhang Zhigang	Shanghai	Fengxian Chemical Industry Park Sports Centre Stadium	N/A	18th
South	Zhenjiang Huasa	(China) Tang Jing	Zhenjiang	Zhenjiang Sports and Exhibition Center	30,000	21st
South	Zhenjiang Huasa	(China) Tang Jing	Zhenjiang	Kunshan Sports Centre Stadium	30,000	21st
South	Hainan Boying	(China) Guo Yijun (caretaker)	Haikou	Hainan Sport School Stadium	10,000	22nd
South	~~Anhui Hefei Guiguan~~ ^{P}	(Serbia) Aleksandar Pantić	Hefei	Hefei Olympic Sports Center Stadium	60,000	CAL, 2nd
South	~~Anhui Hefei Guiguan~~ ^{P}	(Serbia) Aleksandar Pantić	Hefei	Anqing Sports Centre	40,000	CAL, 2nd
South	Fujian Tianxin ^{P}	(China) Zhao Tuqiang	Fuzhou	Fujian Olympic Sports Center Stadium	23,000	CAL, 7th
South	Fujian Tianxin ^{P}	(China) Zhao Tuqiang	Fuzhou	Fujian Normal University Sports Center Stadium	20,000	CAL, 7th
South	Fujian Tianxin ^{P}	(China) Zhao Tuqiang	Fuzhou	Haixia Olympic Center Stadium	59,562	CAL, 7th
South	Shenzhen Pengcheng ^{P}	(China) Chen Dazhi	Shenzhen	Xixiang Sports Center	3,000	CAL, 8th
South	Sichuan Jiuniu ^{P}	(Croatia) Dario Dabac	Chengdu	Nanhu Sports Center	20,000	CAL, 11th
South	Sichuan Jiuniu ^{P}	(Croatia) Dario Dabac	Chengdu	Chengdu Longquanyi Football Stadium	42,000	CAL, 11th

=== Clubs Locations ===
Location of teams in 2018 China League Two

=== Managerial changes ===
Club	Outgoing manager	Date of vacancy	Incoming manager	Date of appointment
Sichuan Longfor	(Portugal) Manuel Cajuda	14 October 2017	(China) Li Bing	4 December 2017
Yanbian Beiguo	(China) Huang Yong	5 December 2017	(South Korea) Wang Sun-jae	24 January 2018
Hunan Billows	(Belgium) Patrick de Wilde	5 December 2017	(China) Pei Encai	22 February 2018
Yinchuan Helanshan	(China) Sun Wei	11 December 2017	(China) Fan Yuhong	1 January 2018
Shaanxi Chang'an Athletic	(China) Huang Hongyi	15 December 2017	(China) Zhao Changhong	16 December 2017
Baoding Yingli ETS	(China) Shang Qing (caretaker)	16 December 2017	(China) Han Yalin	10 February 2018
Qingdao Jonoon	(China) Yin Tiesheng	25 December 2017	(Serbia) Goran Stevanović	25 December 2017
Zibo Sunday	(China) Liu Meng	31 December 2017	(China) Hou Zhiqiang	1 January 2018
Hainan Boying	(Spain) Andoni Bombin Garrido	31 December 2017	(China) Zhang Bing	16 January 2018
Shanghai Sunfun	(China) Cheng Liang	31 December 2017	(Japan) Teshima Atsushi	25 February 2018
Sichuan Jiuniu	(China) Sun Bowei	31 December 2017	(China) Cheng Liang	31 December 2017
Shenyang Urban	(China) Xiao Zhanbo	31 December 2017	(China) Wang Bo	31 December 2017
Anhui Hefei Guiguan	(Serbia) Darko Nović	31 December 2017	(Serbia) Aleksandar Pantić	16 February 2018
Shenyang Dongjin	(China) Wang Gang	8 March 2018	(Serbia) Marjan Živković	8 March 2018
Zhenjiang Huasa	(China) Li Xiao	12 March 2018	(China) Tang Jing	12 March 2018
Yanbian Beiguo	(South Korea) Wang Sun-jae	7 May 2018	(South Korea) Choi Jin-han	8 May 2018
Yunnan Flying Tigers	(Austria) Kurt Garger	11 May 2018	(China) Huang Yan	16 May 2018
Hainan Boying	(China) Zhang Bing	23 May 2018	(China) Guo Yijun (caretaker)	23 May 2018
Shanghai Sunfun	(Japan) Teshima Atsushi	27 May 2018	(China) Zhang Zhigang	27 May 2018
Sichuan Jiuniu	(China) Cheng Liang	30 May 2018	(Croatia) Dario Dabac	7 June 2018
Qingdao Jonoon	(Serbia) Goran Stevanović	14 June 2018	(Serbia) Aleksandar Kristić	14 June 2018
Shenyang Urban	(China) Wang Bo	5 July 2018	(China) Niu Hongli	9 July 2018
Hunan Billows	(China) Pei Encai	7 July 2018	(China) Sun Wei	7 July 2018
Shaanxi Chang'an Athletic	(China) Zhao Changhong	23 July 2018	(China) Xie Yuxin	23 July 2018
Beijing BIT	(Spain) Robert Ahufinger	7 August 2018	(Spain) Asier Eizaguirre	7 August 2018
Shenyang Urban	(China) Niu Hongli	27 August 2018	(China) Wang Gang	27 August 2018
Shenzhen Ledman	(China) Zhang Jun	7 October 2018	(China) Li Yuanping (caretaker)	7 October 2018

== League tables ==
=== North Group ===
Pos	Team	Pld	W	D	L	GF	GA	GD	Pts	Promotion or relegation
1	Shaanxi Chang'an Athletic (Q, P)	26	17	2	7	41	20	+21	53	Qualification to Play-offs
2	Jiangsu Yancheng Dingli (Q)	26	15	7	4	45	20	+25	52 (Note: Jiangsu Yancheng Dingli is ahead of Shenyang Urban on head-to-head points: Jiangsu Yancheng Dingli 2–1 Shenyang Urban, Shenyang Urban 1–2 Jiangsu Yancheng Dingli.)	Qualification to Play-offs
3	Shenyang Urban (Q)	26	16	4	6	51	28	+23	52	Qualification to Play-offs
4	Qingdao Jonoon (Q)	26	16	3	7	44	23	+21	51	Qualification to Play-offs
5	Yinchuan Helanshan	26	14	7	5	45	23	+22	49	9th–26th place Play-offs
6	Hebei Elite	26	11	10	5	50	32	+18	43 (Note: Hebei Elite is ahead of Jilin Baijia on head-to-head points: Hebei Elite 2–1 Jilin Baijia, Jilin Baijia 3–5 Hebei Elite.)	9th–26th place Play-offs
7	Jilin Baijia	26	13	4	9	41	33	+8	43	9th–26th place Play-offs
8	Baoding Yingli ETS	26	13	3	10	38	30	+8	42	9th–26th place Play-offs
9	Dalian Boyoung	26	12	4	10	34	27	+7	40	9th–26th place Play-offs
10	Zibo Sunday	26	10	5	11	34	31	+3	35	9th–26th place Play-offs
11	Beijing BIT	26	8	2	16	39	50	−11	26	9th–26th place Play-offs
12	Yanbian Beiguo	26	7	3	16	29	49	−20	24	9th–26th place Play-offs
13	Baotou Nanjiao	26	3	0	23	24	68	−44	9	9th–26th place Play-offs
14	Shenyang Dongjin	26	0	0	26	0	81	−81	0	Defunct

Rules for classification: 1) Points; 2) Head-to-head points; 3) Head-to-head goal difference; 4) Head-to-head goals scored; 5) Goal difference; 6) Goals scored; 7) Disciplinary points (1 point for each yellow card, 3 points for each red card)
(P) Promoted; (Q) Qualified for the phase indicated

=== South Group ===
Pos	Team	Pld	W	D	L	GF	GA	GD	Pts	Promotion or relegation
1	Sichuan Longfor (Q, C, P)	26	23	3	0	86	10	+76	72	Qualification to Play-offs
2	Nantong Zhiyun (Q, P)	26	18	4	4	55	21	+34	58	Qualification to Play-offs
3	Fujian Tianxin (Q)	26	12	7	7	33	24	+9	43	Qualification to Play-offs
4	Shenzhen Ledman (Q)	26	11	8	7	31	26	+5	41	Qualification to Play-offs
5	Hunan Billows	26	10	10	6	42	28	+14	40	9th–26th place Play-offs
6	Suzhou Dongwu	26	10	9	7	26	26	0	39 (Note: Suzhou Dongwu is ahead of Zhenjiang Huasa on head-to-head points: Suzhou Dongwu 0–0 Zhenjiang Huasa, Zhenjiang Huasa 0–1 Suzhou Dongwu.)	9th–26th place Play-offs
7	Zhenjiang Huasa	26	11	6	9	27	31	−4	39	9th–26th place Play-offs
8	Hainan Boying	26	8	9	9	22	28	−6	33 (Note: Hainan Boying and Shenzhen Pengcheng are ahead of Yunnan Flying Tigers on head-to-head points: Hainan Boying 5 pts, Shenzhen Pengcheng 5 pts, Yunnan Flying Tigers 4 pts. Hainan Boying is ahead of Shenzhen Pengcheng on head-to-head goals scored.)	9th–26th place Play-offs
9	Shenzhen Pengcheng	26	8	9	9	24	24	0	33	9th–26th place Play-offs
10	Yunnan Flying Tigers	26	8	9	9	29	23	+6	33	9th–26th place Play-offs
11	Jiangxi Liansheng	26	7	9	10	33	32	+1	30	9th–26th place Play-offs
12	Sichuan Jiuniu	26	6	9	11	23	25	−2	27	9th–26th place Play-offs
13	Shanghai Sunfun	26	3	2	21	18	73	−55	11	9th–26th place Play-offs
14	Anhui Hefei Guiguan	26	0	0	26	0	78	−78	0	Defunct

Rules for classification: 1) Points; 2) Head-to-head points; 3) Head-to-head goal difference; 4) Head-to-head goals scored; 5) Goal difference; 6) Goals scored; 7) Disciplinary points (1 point for each yellow card, 3 points for each red card)
(C) Champions; (P) Promoted; (Q) Qualified for the phase indicated

=== Overall table ===
Pos	Team	Pld	W	D	L	GF	GA	GD	Pts	Promotion or relegation
1	Sichuan Longfor (C, P)	31	27	4	0	95	10	+85	85	China League One
2	Nantong Zhiyun (P)	31	21	5	5	58	22	+36	68	China League One
3	Shaanxi Chang'an Athletic (Note: Shaanxi Chang'an Athletic was originally advanced to promotion play-offs but lost in the promotion play-offs. However, Shaanxi was promoted following the disqualification of the China League One side Yanbian Funde.) (P)	31	18	4	9	44	24	+20	58	China League One
4	Jiangsu Yancheng Dingli	31	16	9	6	46	23	+23	57	
5	Shenzhen Ledman	28	11	10	7	33	28	+5	43	Disbanded after season
6	Shenyang Urban	28	16	5	7	51	29	+22	53	
7	Fujian Tianxin	28	12	8	8	33	25	+8	44	
8	Qingdao Jonoon	28	16	3	9	44	29	+15	51	
9	Yinchuan Helanshan	28	16	7	5	49	24	+25	55	
10	Hunan Billows	28	10	10	8	43	32	+11	40	
11	Hebei Elite	28	12	11	5	55	33	+22	47	
12	Suzhou Dongwu	28	10	10	8	27	31	−4	40	
13	Zhenjiang Huasa	28	12	7	9	31	33	−2	43	
14	Jilin Baijia	28	13	5	10	43	37	+6	44	
15	Baoding Yingli ETS	28	15	3	10	42	31	+11	48	
16	Hainan Boying	28	8	9	11	23	32	−9	33	Disbanded after season
17	Dalian Boyoung	28	14	4	10	40	30	+10	46	
18	Shenzhen Pengcheng	28	8	9	11	27	30	−3	33	
19	Zibo Sunday	28	12	5	11	38	32	+6	41	
20	Yunnan Flying Tigers (Note: Yunnan Flying Tigers was disqualified by CFA.)	28	8	9	11	30	27	+3	33	Disbanded after season
21	Beijing BIT	28	9	3	16	44	53	−9	30	
22	Jiangxi Liansheng	28	7	10	11	36	37	−1	31	
23	Yanbian Beiguo	28	8	4	16	31	50	−19	28	
24	Sichuan Jiuniu	28	6	10	12	24	27	−3	28	
25	Baotou Nanjiao	28	5	0	23	30	68	−38	15	
26	Shanghai Sunfun	28	3	2	23	18	79	−61	11	Disbanded after season
27	Anhui Hefei Guiguan	26	0	0	26	0	78	−78	0	Defunct
28	Shenyang Dongjin	26	0	0	26	0	81	−81	0	Defunct

Updated to match(es) played on completed. Source:
Rules for classification: (Teams ranked 5th-8th) 1) Points in playoffs; 2) Goal difference in playoffs; 3) Goals scored in playoffs; 4) Average points in group stage; 5) Drawing of lots
(Teams ranked 9th-26th) 1) Points in playoffs; 2) Goals scored in playoffs; 3) Away goals scored in playoffs; 4) Overtime; 5) Penalty shoot-out
(C) Champions; (P) Promoted

== Play-offs ==
=== 25th–26th place ===
Team 1	Agg.	Team 2	1st leg	2nd leg
Baotou Nanjiao	6–0	Shanghai Sunfun	3–0	3–0

7 October 2018
15:00

Baotou Nanjiao	Cancelled	Shanghai Sunfun

Baotou Olympic Sports Centre Stadium, Baotou
13 October 2018
15:00

Shanghai Sunfun	Cancelled	Baotou Nanjiao

Fengxian Chemical Industry Park Sports Centre Stadium, Shanghai

=== 23rd–24th place ===
Team 1	Agg.	Team 2	1st leg	2nd leg
Yanbian Beiguo	2–1	Sichuan Jiuniu	1–1	1–0

7 October 2018
15:00

Yanbian Beiguo	1–1	Sichuan Jiuniu
Almjan Abdugheni 82'		Wu Weijian 70'

Hunchun People's Stadium, Hunchun
Attendance: 854
Referee: Wang Yang
13 October 2018
15:00

Sichuan Jiuniu	0–1	Yanbian Beiguo
		Ma Dongnan 15'

Chengdu Longquanyi Football Stadium, Chengdu
Attendance: 2,657
Referee: Zhang Kuan

=== 21st–22nd place ===
Team 1	Agg.	Team 2	1st leg	2nd leg
Beijing BIT	5–3	Jiangxi Liansheng	3–1	2–2

6 October 2018
15:00

Beijing BIT	3–1	Jiangxi Liansheng
Gong Zheng 19'; Li Sichen 49'; Zhang Liang 66'		Zhou Xuezhong 52'

BIT Eastern Athletic Field, Beijing
Attendance: 138
Referee: Wang Xihong
13 October 2018
15:00

Jiangxi Liansheng	2–2	Beijing BIT
Yuan Mingcan 2' (pen.), 15'		Li Sichen 56'; Gong Zheng 57'

Ruichang Sports Park Stadium, Ruichang
Attendance: 1,080
Referee: Cui Yueqiang

=== 19th–20th place ===
Team 1	Agg.	Team 2	1st leg	2nd leg
Yunnan Flying Tigers	1–4	Zibo Sunday	1–2	0–2

7 October 2018
15:00

Yunnan Flying Tigers	1–2	Zibo Sunday
Wang Zhipeng 33' (pen.)		Ji Shengpan 43', 80'

Lijiang Sports Development Centre Stadium, Lijiang
Attendance: 568
Referee: Huang Liangbin
14 October 2018
15:00

Zibo Sunday	2–0	Yunnan Flying Tigers
Xu Li'ao 70'; Du Yuxin 79'

Zibo Sports Center Stadium, Zibo
Attendance: 1,180
Referee: Wang Hongwei

=== 17th–18th place ===
Team 1	Agg.	Team 2	1st leg	2nd leg
Shenzhen Pengcheng	3–6	Dalian Boyoung	1–2	2–4

7 October 2018
15:00

Shenzhen Pengcheng	1–2	Dalian Boyoung
Zhou Jun 46'		Ge Yuxiang 14'; Liu Jiaxin 20'

Xixiang Sports Center, Shenzhen
Attendance: 1,481
Referee: Wang Haidong
11 October 2018
15:00

Dalian Boyoung	4–2	Shenzhen Pengcheng
Ge Yuxiang 35', 51', 84'; Xu Xin 88'		Huang Cheng 13'; Ye Shuwen 71'

Jinzhou Stadium, Dalian
Attendance: 258
Referee: Liang Ming

=== 15th–16th place ===
Team 1	Agg.	Team 2	1st leg	2nd leg
Hainan Boying	1–4	Baoding Yingli ETS	0–1	1–3

6 October 2018
15:00

Hainan Boying	0–1	Baoding Yingli ETS
		Yang Hao 85'

Hainan Sport School Stadium, Haikou
Attendance: 1,098
Referee: Jiang Ning
13 October 2018
15:00

Baoding Yingli ETS	3–1	Hainan Boying
Di You 5'; Yang Hao 24'; Wang Hanbing 44'		Li Changliang 75'

Hebei University Stadium, Baoding
Attendance: 2,141
Referee: Guo Xiang

=== 13th–14th place ===
Team 1	Agg.	Team 2	1st leg	2nd leg
Jilin Baijia	2–4	Zhenjiang Huasa	0–2	2–2

7 October 2018
15:00

Jilin Baijia	0–2	Zhenjiang Huasa
		Yu Zengpin 23', 80'

Development Area Stadium, Changchun
Attendance: 265
Referee: Gu Zhongchao
13 October 2018
15:00

Zhenjiang Huasa	2–2	Jilin Baijia
Wang Yuyang 19'; Yu Zengpin 26'		Li Yuankun 52', 80'

Kunshan Sports Centre Stadium, Kunshan
Attendance: 1,368
Referee: Zhao Ming

=== 11th–12th place ===
Team 1	Agg.	Team 2	1st leg	2nd leg
Suzhou Dongwu	1–5	Hebei Elite	1–1	0–4

6 October 2018
15:00

Suzhou Dongwu	1–1	Hebei Elite
Liu Huan 35'		Wang Jinlei 57'

Suzhou Sports Center, Suzhou
Attendance: 688
Referee: Zhang Yangfan
13 October 2018
15:00

Hebei Elite	4–0	Suzhou Dongwu
Zhang Liang 7'; Cui Hao 24', 86'; Wang Jinlei 62'

Chinese Football School Stadium, Qinhuangdao
Attendance: 336
Referee: Li Wei

=== 9th–10th place ===
Team 1	Agg.	Team 2	1st leg	2nd leg
Hunan Billows	1–4	Yinchuan Helanshan	1–3	0–1

6 October 2018
15:00

Hunan Billows	1–3	Yinchuan Helanshan
Ruan Yang 31'		Su Junfeng 45'; Ye Guochen 56'; Han Zhiting 90+2'

Yiyang Olympic Sports Park Stadium, Yiyang
Attendance: 324
Referee: Li Pengda
13 October 2018
15:00

Yinchuan Helanshan	1–0	Hunan Billows
Chen Bo 10'

Wuzhong Yellow River Cultural and Sports Center, Wuzhong
Attendance: 657
Referee: Xiang Yao

=== Quarter-finals ===
Team 1	Agg.	Team 2	1st leg	2nd leg
Shenzhen Ledman	2–2 (a)	Shaanxi Chang'an Athletic	2–2	0–0
Shenyang Urban	0–1	Nantong Zhiyun	0–0	0–1
Qingdao Jonoon	0–6	Sichuan Longfor	0–2	0–4
Fujian Tianxin	0–1	Jiangsu Yancheng Dingli	0–0	0–1

6 October 2018
15:00

Shenzhen Ledman	2–2	Shaanxi Chang'an Athletic
Yang Chen 27' (pen.); Mai Sijing 44'		Fan Da 6'; Yang He 10'

Bao'an Stadium, Shenzhen
Attendance: 503
Referee: Su Zihao
13 October 2018
19:35

Shaanxi Chang'an Athletic	0–0	Shenzhen Ledman

Shaanxi Province Stadium, Xi'an
Attendance: 41,838
Referee: Shi Zhenlu

2–2 on aggregate. Shaanxi Chang'an Athletic won on away goals.

6 October 2018
15:00

Shenyang Urban	0–0	Nantong Zhiyun

Shenyang Urban Construction University Stadium, Shenyang
Attendance: 1,668
Referee: Li Zheng
13 October 2018
19:35

Nantong Zhiyun	1–0	Shenyang Urban
Song Yue 52'

Rugao Olympic Sports Center, Rugao
Attendance: 12,689
Referee: Tang Shunqi

Nantong Zhiyun won 1–0 on aggregate.

6 October 2018
15:00

Qingdao Jonoon	0–2	Sichuan Longfor
		Chen Shaoqin 62'; Zhang Zhichao 78'

Qingdao Tiantai Stadium, Qingdao
Attendance: 882
Referee: Zhen Wei
13 October 2018
19:35

Sichuan Longfor	4–0	Qingdao Jonoon
Qu Cheng 8'; Duan Yunzi 15'; Ma Chongchong 29'; Zhang Jingyang 85'

Dujiangyan Phoenix Stadium, Dujiangyan
Attendance: 7,016
Referee: Liang Caiwei

Sichuan Longfor won 6–0 on aggregate.

6 October 2018
19:30

Fujian Tianxin	0–0	Jiangsu Yancheng Dingli

Haixia Olympic Center Stadium, Fuzhou
Attendance: 2,683
Referee: Gan Shuran
13 October 2018
15:00

Jiangsu Yancheng Dingli	1–0	Fujian Tianxin
Wang Chao 9'

Dafeng Olympic Sports Centre, Yancheng
Attendance: 889
Referee: Liu Lin

Jiangsu Yancheng Dingli won 1–0 on aggregate.

=== Semi-finals ===
Team 1	Agg.	Team 2	1st leg	2nd leg
Nantong Zhiyun	2–0	Shaanxi Chang'an Athletic	1–0	1–0
Jiangsu Yancheng Dingli	0–2 (a.e.t.)	Sichuan Longfor	0–0	0–2

20 October 2018
19:35

Nantong Zhiyun	1–0	Shaanxi Chang'an Athletic
Nan Yunqi 12'

Rugao Olympic Sports Center, Rugao
Attendance: 14,815
Referee: Lin Jun
27 October 2018
19:35

Shaanxi Chang'an Athletic	0–1	Nantong Zhiyun
		Nan Yunqi 90+3'

Shaanxi Province Stadium, Xi'an
Attendance: 48,869
Referee: Ma Li

Nantong Zhiyun won 2–0 on aggregate.

20 October 2018
15:00

Jiangsu Yancheng Dingli	0–0	Sichuan Longfor

Dafeng Olympic Sports Centre, Yancheng
Attendance: 1,232
Referee: Ma Li
27 October 2018
19:35

Sichuan Longfor	2–0 (a.e.t.)	Jiangsu Yancheng Dingli
Yang Zi 102'; Ma Chongchong 107'

Dujiangyan Phoenix Stadium, Dujiangyan
Attendance: 11,696
Referee: Huang Yejun

Sichuan Longfor won 2–0 on aggregate.

=== Third-Place Match ===
3 November 2018
15:00

Shaanxi Chang'an Athletic	1–0	Jiangsu Yancheng Dingli
Yang He 90+1'

Shaanxi Province Stadium, Xi'an
Attendance: 35,683
Referee: Muhammad Taqi (Singapore)

Shaanxi Chang'an Athletic qualified to 2018 China League One relegation play-offs.

=== Final Match ===
4 November 2018
17:00

Nantong Zhiyun	0–1	Sichuan Longfor
		Zhang Jingyang 66'

Rugao Olympic Sports Center, Rugao
Attendance: 14,986
Referee: Xing Qi

== Results ==
=== North Group ===
Home \ Away	BDY	BTN	BIT	DLB	HBE	JYD	JLB	QDJ	SCA	SYD	SYU	YAB	YCH	ZBS
Baoding Yingli ETS	—	4–1		1–0	3–3	1–0		1–2	2–1	—	0–2	0–0	1–1	0–1
Baotou Nanjiao	1–2	—	0–4		0–3	3–2		0–2	0–1	2–0	1–2	1–2	1–5	0–2
Beijing BIT	4–2	2–1	—	3–4	1–3	0–3	3–3	2–3	0–2	—	0–2		0–1	1–2
Dalian Boyoung	1–0	2–1	2–1	—	1–1	0–1	1–0		2–1	2–1	0–1	3–1	0–2	2–0
Hebei Elite	4–1	5–1	1–1	1–0	—		2–1	2–1	1–2	2–0	3–3	0–0	1–1	1–1
Jiangsu Yancheng Dingli	2–1	3–2		0–0	2–1	—	2–1	1–0	3–1	—		3–0	0–0	2–0
Jilin Baijia	0–1	1–0	1–0	2–1	3–5	1–1	—	1–0	2–1	—	1–3	3–2	0–0	1–0
Qingdao Jonoon	0–1	2–0	0–2	1–0	1–1	2–2	2–1	—	1–0	2–0	2–0	2–0		3–1
Shaanxi Chang'an Athletic	2–0	2–0	3–1	2–0		1–1	0–1		—	3–0	1–1	1–0	1–0	6–2
Shenyang Dongjin	1–2	—	0–2	—	—	0–1	2–0	—	—	—	0–1	—	0–4	—
Shenyang Urban	2–1	7–1	3–2	0–0	2–1	1–2	2–3	1–2		—	—	4–0	1–1	1–0
Yanbian Beiguo	0–3	2–1	0–1	0–3		0–5	2–2	0–1	0–1	2–2	2–3	—	3–2	
Yinchuan Helanshan	2–1	3–0	2–1		3–1	1–0	2–1	1–3	1–2	—		4–1	—	1–1
Zibo Sunday		2–0	5–0	0–0	0–0	0–0	0–3	3–2	0–1	5–0	3–1	1–0	1–2	—

Updated to match(es) played on 9 September 2018. Source:
Legend: Blue = home team win; Yellow = draw; Red = away team win.

=== South Group ===
Home \ Away	AHG	FJT	HNB	HNX	JXL	NTZ	SHS	SZR	SZP	SCJ	SCL	SZD	YN	ZJH
Anhui Hefei Guiguan	—	2–0		1–1			3–1	2–2			0–3			3–2
Fujian Tianxin		—	2–0	2–0	1–1	0–0	5–0	0–1	1–1		0–2	0–0	1–0	2–0
Hainan Boying	1–0	1–2	—	1–1	1–1	0–0	1–0		1–0	0–0	0–1	1–2	0–0	3–2
Hunan Billows		2–3	0–0	—		3–3	3–1	3–2	1–1	0–0	0–2	1–1	2–0	2–0
Jiangxi Liansheng	0–0		4–0	2–2	—	1–3	2–0	0–2	2–0	1–1		1–1	0–1	0–1
Nantong Zhiyun	3–1	3–1	4–1		2–0	—	1–0		3–1	3–0	1–2	2–0	2–0	5–0
Shanghai Sunfun		0–0	1–1	1–6	0–4	1–4	—	2–3	0–1	1–2	1–6	0–2	2–0	
Shenzhen Ledman		2–1	0–2	0–2	2–1	1–3	3–0	—	2–0	1–0	1–1		1–0	0–0
Shenzhen Pengcheng	0–1		1–0	0–0	1–1	1–2		0–0	—	0–1	1–3	1–0	0–0	3–0
Sichuan Jiuniu	1–0	0–1	0–1		0–0	0–0	5–0	4–1	0–3	—	0–1	0–0	1–1	
Sichuan Longfor		6–0	5–0	3–1	6–1		9–0	2–0	4–0	3–0	—	5–0	3–0	4–0
Suzhou Dongwu	3–1	1–0	0–1	1–2	1–0	1–3	1–0	0–0	2–1	2–1		—	0–0	0–0
Yunnan Flying Tigers	3–0	2–0		0–0	2–2	2–1	8–0	0–0	0–0	1–0	1–4		—	0–1
Zhenjiang Huasa		1–2	1–0	1–3	2–0	1–0	2–1	1–1		1–1	0–0	0–1	2–1	—

Updated to match(es) played on 9 September 2018. Source:
Legend: Blue = home team win; Yellow = draw; Red = away team win.

== Results by match played ==
=== North Group ===
Team ╲ Round	1	2	3	4	5	6	7	8	9	10	11	12	13	14	15	16	17	18	19	20	21	22	23	24	25	26
Baoding Yingli ETS	W	W	W	D	L	W	L	L	L	D	L	L	W	W	C	L	W	W	L	D	W	L	L			
Baotou Nanjiao	L	L	L	L	L	L	L	L	L	L	L	L	W	L	L	W	L	L	L	L	L	L	L			
Beijing BIT	L	L	W	L	D	L	L	L	W	W	W	W	L	L	L	L	L	L	L	L	D	W	C			
Dalian Boyoung	W	L	L	D	W	W	D	W	W	W	L	W	L	C	D	W	L	W	W	L	D	L	L			
Hebei Elite	L	D	L	D	D	D	W	W	W	D	D	L	L	D	W	D	W	W	D	W	W	C	W			
Jiangsu Yancheng Dingli	D	W	W	W	W	W	D	W	L	W	W	W	W	W	D	L	C	L	W	W	D	D	D			
Jilin Baijia	D	L	W	D	L	L	L	W	W	L	W	L	L	W	D	W	L	W	W	L	D	W	W			
Qingdao Jonoon	W	D	L	L	W	W	W	W	W	L	W	W	W	W	L	W	W	L	W	C	L	W	D			
Shaanxi Chang'an Athletic	W	W	L	W	W	L	W	L	L	W	L	D	W	W	W	L	W	C	W	W	D	W	W			
Shenyang Dongjin	L	L	D	L	L	L	L	L	L	L	L	W	L	C	C	C	C	C	C	C	C	C	C	C	C	C
Shenyang Urban	L	W	W	W	W	W	W	W	W	W	L	D	D	L	D	D	W	L	L	W	C	W	W			
Yanbian Beiguo	D	W	D	D	L	L	L	L	L	L	D	L	L	L	W	C	L	L	L	L	W	L	L			
Yinchuan Helanshan	W	W	D	D	W	W	W	W	W	L	W	L	D	D	W	W	W	W	C	D	L	D	L			
Zibo Sunday	D	L	D	W	L	D	W	L	L	W	W	W	W	L	L	L	L	W	D	W	D	L	W			

Updated to match(es) played on 9 September 2018. Source:
W = Win; D = Draw; L = Loss; C = Match cancelled

=== South Group ===
Team ╲ Round	1	2	3	4	5	6	7	8	9	10	11	12	13	14	15	16	17	18	19	20	21	22	23	24	25	26
Anhui Hefei Guiguan	W	D	L	L	D	D	L	W	L	W	L	W	L	C	C	C	C	C	C	C	C	C	C	C	C	C
Fujian Tianxin	L	D	W	W	L	L	W	L	W	D	D	W	D	D	L	W	L	L	L	W		W	W			
Hainan Boying	L	D	L	L	W	L	D	L	D	W	W	D	W	L	D	L	W	D	W	W	D	L	L			
Hunan Billows	W	D	D	W	L	D	L	W	W	D	D	D	D	D	D	W	W	L		L	W	W	D			
Jiangxi Liansheng	L	W	W	D	D	L	L	W	D	L	L	D	D	L	W	D	D		L	D	D	L	L			
Nantong Zhiyun	W	L	W	W	W	W	W	W	D	W	W	L	D	D	W	W	W	D	W		W	W	L			
Shanghai Sunfun	L	L	L	L	L	W	L	L	L	D	L	L	L	L	L	L	L	D	L	L	L	L	L			
Shenzhen Ledman	D	D	D	L	W	D	W	D	W	W	L	D	L	W		L	L	W	D	W	W	L	W			
Shenzhen Pengcheng	L	L	L	L	L	W	D	D	L	D	D	W	W		W	D	L	W	L	D	L	L	D			
Sichuan Jiuniu	W	W	W	D	L	D	D	D	L	L	D	L	D	W	L		D	D	L	L	L	W	L			
Sichuan Longfor	W	W	D	W	W	W	W	W	W	W	W	W	W	W	W	W		W	W	D	W	W	W			
Suzhou Dongwu	L	D	D	W	W	D	W	L	W	L	D	D	L	D	W	W	W	L	W	D	L		W			
Yunnan Flying Tigers	D	L	D	L	L	L	D	D	D	L	D	D	W	L	L	L	W	L	W	D	W	W	W			
Zhenjiang Huasa	W	W	D	W	W	D	L	L	L	L	W	L	D	W	L	L	L	W	D	D	L	L				

Updated to match(es) played on 9 September 2018. Source:
W = Win; D = Draw; L = Loss; C = Match cancelled

== Top scorers ==
Rank	Player	Club	Goals
1	(China) Qu Cheng	Sichuan Longfor	17
2	(China) Wang Feike	Hebei Elite	16
3	(China) Yang He	Shaanxi Chang'an Athletic	15
4	(China) Gong Zheng	Beijing BIT	13
4	(China) Hou Zhe	Baoding Yingli ETS	13
4	(China) Shi Jun	Hebei Elite	13
4	(China) Zhang Zhichao	Sichuan Longfor	13
8	(China) Shang Yin	Sichuan Longfor	12
8	(China) Zhang Hao	Hunan Billows	12
8	(China) Zhuang Jiajie	Hunan Billows	12

Last updated: 4 November 2018
Source: Top scorers

== Awards ==
The awards of 2018 China League Two were announced on 19 December 2018.

Award	Winner	Club
Player of the Season	(China) Zhu Zhengrong	Nantong Zhiyun
Golden Boot	(China) Qu Cheng	Sichuan Longfor
Manager of the Season	(China) Li Bing	Sichuan Longfor
Goalkeeper of the Season	(China) Zhang Jin	Jiangsu Yancheng Dingli
Young Player of the Season	(China) Ruan Jun	Sichuan Jiuniu

== League attendance ==
Pos	Team	Total	High	Low	Average	Change
1	Shaanxi Chang'an Athletic	110,077	22,108	8,316	15,725	−5.8%
2	Nantong Zhiyun	77,770	12,866	8,689	11,110	+227.5%
3	Jiangxi Liansheng	47,119	8,868	5,130	6,731	+339.4%
4	Sichuan Jiuniu	44,754	13,822	2,315	6,393	n/a^{††}
5	Sichuan Longfor	23,781	4,717	2,751	3,964	−15.6%
6	Shenyang Urban	31,520	6,028	555	3,940	+123.7%
7	Baoding Yingli ETS	26,265	6,820	410	3,752	−39.0%^{†}
8	Yanbian Beiguo	15,993	10,112	1,068	3,199	n/a^{††}
9	Fujian Tianxin	12,791	2,833	636	2,132	n/a^{††}
10	Zibo Sunday	12,414	6,700	574	2,069	n/a^{††}
11	Yunnan Flying Tigers	10,944	2,764	452	1,824	−63.0%^{†}
12	Yinchuan Helanshan	11,328	3,216	0	1,618	−29.6%
13	Zhenjiang Huasa	9,118	2,668	669	1,520	+72.5%
14	Suzhou Dongwu	10,134	6,652	128	1,267	+10.2%
15	Hainan Boying	6,865	1,866	216	981	−1.9%
16	Shenzhen Ledman	5,192	1,051	601	865	−72.3%
17	Shenzhen Pengcheng	3,847	888	263	550	n/a^{††}
18	Jiangsu Yancheng Dingli	3,236	756	232	462	−8.5%
19	Beijing BIT	2,766	869	182	461	−20.1%
20	Jilin Baijia	2,248	637	203	450	−28.0%
21	Hebei Elite	2,591	531	313	432	+18.0%
22	Dalian Boyoung	3,887	851	205	432	−10.4%
23	Baotou Nanjiao	1,637	610	301	409	−86.5%
24	Hunan Billows	2,350	521	220	392	−42.2%
26	~~Anhui Hefei Guiguan~~	1,995	619	212	333	n/a^{††}
25	Qingdao Jonoon	1,577	583	132	315	−62.5%
27	~~Shenyang Dongjin~~	1,302	356	110	217	−23.9%
28	Shanghai Sunfun	999	300	76	167	−50.1%
	League total	484,500	22,108	0	2,707	+0.6%

Updated to games played on 24 June 2018
Notes:
^{†} Teams played previous season in CL1.
^{††} Teams played previous season in CAL.
