= Duan Yunzi =

Chinese association football player

Personal information
- Date of birth: 24 January 1995 (age 31)
- Place of birth: Hengshui, Hebei, China
- Height: 1.77 m (5 ft 10 in)
- Positions: Forward; midfielder

Team information
- Current team: Guangdong GZ-Power
- Number: 6

Youth career
- –2013: Liaoning Youth

Senior career*
Years	Team	Apps	(Gls)
2014–2018	Dalian Yifang	0	(0)
2016	→ Shenyang Urban (loan)	19	(0)
2017	→ Shenyang Urban (loan)	23	(2)
2018	→ Sichuan Longfor (loan)	26	(4)
2019	Sichuan Longfor	24	(0)
2020–2022	Wuhan Three Towns	44	(2)
2023	Nanjing City	24	(1)
2024	Liaoning Tieren	16	(1)
2025–	Guangdong GZ-Power	7	(0)

International career
2014	China U19		
- * Club domestic league appearances and goals as of 14:01, 11 January 2023 (UTC)

Duan Yunzi (Chinese: 段云子; born 24 January 1995) is a Chinese footballer currently playing as a forward or midfielder for Guangdong GZ-Power.

== Club career ==
Duan Yunzi would be promoted to the senior team of Dalian Yifang and go on to make his debut in a 2014 Chinese FA Cup game on 15 July 2014 against Yanbian Baekdu in a 2-0 defeat. To gain more playing time he was loaned out to newly promoted third tier club Shenyang Urban on 9 March 2016. He would extend his loan at Shenyang Urban before joining another third tier club in Sichuan Longfor on loan for the 2018 China League Two league season, where he went on to establish himself as vital player as the club gained promotion when they won the division title without losing a single game. On 9 March 2018 he would join them on a permanent basis. He would go on to continue to be a vital member of the team as he was able to keep them within the division and avoid relegation, however the club was dissolved after they failed to submit the salary & bonus confirmation form before the 2020 season.

On 5 August 2020, Duan was free to move to third tier club Wuhan Three Towns. In his first season with the club he would go on to aid them in winning the division title and promotion into the second tier. This would be followed by another division title win and promotion as the club entered the top tier for the first tine in their history. The following campaign he would be part of the squad that won the 2022 Chinese Super League title.

== Career statistics ==
As of 31 December 2024.

Club	Season	League			Cup		Continental		Other		Total	
Club	Season	Division	Apps	Goals	Apps	Goals	Apps	Goals	Apps	Goals	Apps	Goals
Dalian Yifang	2014	Chinese Super League	0	0	1	0	-		-		0	0
Dalian Yifang	2015	China League One	0	0	0	0	-		-		0	0
Dalian Yifang	Total		0	0	1	0	0	0	0	0	1	0
Shenyang Urban (loan)	2016	China League Two	19	0	2	0	-		-		21	0
Shenyang Urban (loan)	2017	China League Two	23	2	0	0	-		-		23	2
Shenyang Urban (loan)	Total		42	2	2	0	0	0	0	0	44	2
Sichuan Longfor (loan)	2018	China League Two	26	4	2	0	-		-		28	4
Sichuan Longfor	2019	China League One	24	0	0	0	-		2 (Note: Appearances in Relegation/Promotion play-offs)	0	26	0
Wuhan Three Towns	2020	China League Two	11	1	0	0	-		-		11	1
Wuhan Three Towns	2021	China League One	25	1	0	0	-		-		25	1
Wuhan Three Towns	2022	Chinese Super League	8	0	3	1	-		-		11	1
Wuhan Three Towns	Total		44	2	3	1	0	0	0	0	47	3
Nanjing City	2023	China League One	24	1	2	1	-		-		26	2
Liaoning Tieren	2024	China League One	22	1	0	0	-		-		22	1
Career total			182	10	10	2	0	0	2	0	194	12

== Honours ==
=== Club ===
Sichuan Longfor

- China League Two: 2018

Wuhan Three Towns

- Chinese Super League: 2022.
- China League One: 2021
- China League Two: 2020

Guangdong GZ-Power

- China League One: 2026
