= 2019 China League One =

Chinese football league season

China League One
- Season: 2019
- Dates: 16 March 2019 – 2 November
- Champions: Qingdao Huanghai
- Promoted: Qingdao Huanghai; Shijiazhuang Ever Bright
- Relegated: ~~Guangdong South China Tiger~~; ~~Sichuan Longfor~~; ~~Liaoning F.C.~~; ~~Shanghai Shenxin~~
- Matches: 244
- Goals: 701 (2.87 per match)
- Top goalscorer: Oscar Maritu (22 goals)
- Biggest home win: Qingdao Huanghai 9–2 Shanghai Shenxin (22 June 2019)
- Biggest away win: Shanghai Shenxin 1–7 Meizhou Hakka (29 June 2019)
- Highest scoring: Qingdao Huanghai 9–2 Shanghai Shenxin (22 June 2019)
- Longest winning run: 7 matches Inner Mongolia Zhongyou; Guizhou Hengfeng
- Longest unbeaten run: 10 matches Changchun Yatai; Heilongjiang Lava Spring
- Longest winless run: 15 matches Shanghai Shenxin
- Longest losing run: 9 matches Shanghai Shenxin
- Highest attendance: 35,613; Shijiazhuang Ever Bright 2–0 Xinjiang Tianshan Leopard (2 November 2019)
- Lowest attendance: 815; Shanghai Shenxin 0–1 Guizhou Hengfeng (7 September 2019)
- Total attendance: 2,232,305
- Average attendance: 9,301
- All statistics correct as of 10 November 2019.

The 2019 China League One (Chinese: 58同城 2019中国足球协会甲级联赛) was the 16th season of the China League One, the second tier of the Chinese football league pyramid, since its establishment in 2004. The league's title sponsor was the e-commerce website 58.com.

The season began on 9 March and concluded on 2 November.

Policy regarding foreign players and U-23 domestic players was modified in this season. The same as the previous two seasons, at least one domestic player who is under the age of 23 (born on or after 1 January 1996) must be in the starting eleven. However, the total number of foreign players appearing in matches is no longer related to the total number of U-23 domestic players. A club can register three foreign players at most in the same time and use two foreign players at most in a match. On the other hand, at least two U-23 domestic players must be used in a match. In addition, if there are U23 players who have been called up by the national teams at all levels, the number of U-23 domestic players fielded will be reduced accordingly.

In order to expand the number of teams from 16 to 18 in 2020 season, this season will only directly relegate 1 team instead of 2 teams while 2 teams will enter relegation playoffs.

== Teams ==
=== Team changes ===
==== To League One ====
Teams relegated from 2018 Chinese Super League

- Changchun Yatai
- Guizhou Hengfeng

Teams promoted from 2018 China League Two

- Sichuan Longfor
- Nantong Zhiyun
- Shaanxi Chang'an Athletic

==== From League One ====
Teams promoted to 2019 Chinese Super League

- Wuhan Zall
- Shenzhen F.C.

Team relegated to 2019 China League Two

- Zhejiang Yiteng (Failed to register)
- ~~Dalian Transcendence~~

Team dissolved

- Yanbian Funde
- ~~Dalian Transcendence~~

=== Name changes ===
- Nei Mongol Zhongyou F.C. changed their name to Inner Mongolia Zhongyou F.C. in November 2018.
- Meizhou Meixian Techand F.C. changed their name to Guangdong South China Tiger F.C. in January 2019.
- Beijing Enterprises Group F.C. changed their name to Beijing Sport University F.C. in January 2019.

== Clubs ==
=== Stadiums and Locations ===
Team	Head coach	City	Stadium	Capacity	2018 season
Changchun Yatai ^{R}	(Serbia) Svetozar Šapurić	Changchun	Changchun Stadium	41,638	CSL, 15th
Guizhou Hengfeng ^{R}	(China) Chen Mao	Guiyang	Guiyang Olympic Sports Center	51,636	CSL, 16th
Zhejiang Greentown	(China) Zheng Xiong	Hangzhou	Yellow Dragon Sports Center	52,672	3rd
Qingdao Huanghai	(Spain) Juan Manuel Lillo	Qingdao	Qingdao Guoxin Stadium	45,000	4th
Beijing BSU	(China) Su Maozhen	Beijing	Olympic Sports Centre	36,228	5th
Shijiazhuang Ever Bright	(Iran) Afshin Ghotbi	Shijiazhuang	Hebei Olympic Sports Center	60,000	6th
Heilongjiang Lava Spring	(China) Duan Xin	Harbin	Harbin ICE Sports Center	50,000	7th
Liaoning F.C.	(China) Zang Haili	Shenyang	Tiexi New District Sports Center	30,000	8th
Meizhou Hakka	(China) Zheng Xiaotian	Wuhua	Huitang Stadium	30,000	9th
Shanghai Shenxin	(China) Zhu Jiong	Shanghai	Jinshan Football Stadium	30,000	11th
Inner Mongolia Zhongyou	(China) Chen Yang	Hohhot	Hohhot City Stadium	51,632	13th
Sichuan Longfor ^{P}	(China) Li Bing	Dujiangyan	Dujiangyan Phoenix Stadium	12,700	CL2, 1st
Nantong Zhiyun ^{P}	(England) Gary White	Rugao	Rugao Olympic Sports Center	15,000	CL2, 2nd
Guangdong South China Tiger	(China) Fu Bo	Meizhou	Meixian Tsang Hin-chi Stadium	20,221	14th (Relegation play-offs winner)
Xinjiang Tianshan Leopard	(Spain) Fernando	Ürümqi	Xinjiang Sports Centre	50,000	16th
Shaanxi Chang'an Athletic ^{P}	(China) Wang Bo	Xi'an (playing in Weinan)	Weinan Sports Center Stadium	32,000	CL2, 3rd (Relegation play-offs loser)

=== Clubs Locations ===
Location of teams in 2019 China League One

=== Managerial changes ===
Team	Outgoing manager	Manner of departure	Date of vacancy	Position in table	Incoming manager	Date of appointment
Xinjiang Tianshan Leopard	(China) Li Jun	Mutual consent	6 November 2018	Pre-season	(Spain) Fernando	1 December 2018
Meizhou Hakka	(China) Li Weijun (caretaker)	End of caretaker spell	19 December 2018	Pre-season	(China) Zheng Xiaotian	19 December 2018
Liaoning F.C.	(China) Chen Yang	Resigned	13 January 2019	Pre-season	(China) Zang Haili	13 February 2019
Shaanxi Chang'an Athletic	(China) Xie Yuxin	Mutual consent	23 January 2019	Pre-season	(China) Zhang Jun	1 February 2019
Inner Mongolia Zhongyou	(China) Wang Bo	Mutual consent	4 March 2019	Pre-season	(China) Chen Yang	4 March 2019
Guizhou Hengfeng	(Romania) Dan Petrescu	Signed by CFR Cluj	23 March 2019	4th	(China) Hao Haitao	24 March 2019
Sichuan Longfor	(China) Li Bing	Mutual consent	13 May 2019	9th	(China) Peng Xiaofang (caretaker)	13 May 2019
Shaanxi Chang'an Athletic	(China) Zhang Jun	Sacked	20 May 2019	13th	(China) Wang Bo	22 May 2019
Changchun Yatai	(China) Chen Jingang	Sacked	6 June 2019	6th	(Serbia) Svetozar Šapurić	9 June 2019
Guizhou Hengfeng	(China) Hao Haitao	Mutual consent	19 June 2019	2nd	(China) Chen Mao	19 June 2019
Zhejiang Greentown	(Spain) Sergi Barjuán	Sacked	3 July 2019	6th	(China) Zheng Xiong	3 July 2019
Sichuan Longfor	(China) Peng Xiaofang (caretaker)	Mutual consent	18 July 2019	15th	(China) Li Bing	18 July 2019
Shijiazhuang Ever Bright	(Bulgaria) Yasen Petrov	Sacked	19 July 2019	6th	(Iran) Afshin Ghotbi	20 July 2019
Qingdao Huanghai	(Spain) Jordi Vinyals	Sacked	30 July 2019	1st	(Spain) Óscar Céspedes (caretaker)	30 July 2019
Qingdao Huanghai	(Spain) Óscar Céspedes (caretaker)	End of caretaker spell	18 August 2019	3rd	(Spain) Juan Manuel Lillo	18 August 2019
Nantong Zhiyun	(China) Wei Xin	Appointed as vice-manager	18 August 2019	13th	(England) Gary White	20 August 2019
Beijing BSU	(China) Gao Hongbo	Appointed as vice-president by CFA	22 August 2019	6th	(China) Su Maozhen	22 August 2019

== Foreign players ==
A total of four foreign players can be registered in a season and the number of foreign players is limited to three per CL1 team in the same time. Maximum of two foreign players can be fielded in one match.

Players name in bold indicates the player is registered during the mid-season transfer window.

Club	Player 1	Player 2	Player 3	Hong Kong/Macau/ Taiwan Player ^{1}	Former players ^{2}
Beijing BSU	(Brazil) Lins	(Ivory Coast) Gerard Gohou	**(Ecuador) Juan Luis Anangonó**	(Chinese Taipei) Wen Chih-hao	(Nigeria) Dominic Vinicius
Changchun Yatai	(Brazil) Maurides	(Netherlands) Richairo Zivkovic	**(Serbia) Stefan Dražić**		(Spain) Jose Manuel Jurado
Guangdong South China Tiger	(Brazil) Aloísio	(Germany) Richard Sukuta-Pasu	(Serbia) Alen Melunović		
Guizhou Hengfeng	(Brazil) Sérgio Mota	(Croatia) Nikica Jelavić	(Croatia) Anton Maglica	(Hong Kong) Festus Baise	
Heilongjiang Lava Spring	(Brazil) Victor Bolt	**(Martinique) Yoann Arquin**	(Nigeria) Daniel Chima Chukwu		
Inner Mongolia Zhongyou	**(Brazil) Guto**	(Senegal) Babacar Gueye	(Senegal) André Senghor		(Nigeria) John Owoeri
Liaoning F.C.	(Brazil) Gustavo	**(Democratic Republic of the Congo) Vinny Bongonga**	(Zambia) Jacob Mulenga		
Meizhou Hakka	(Brazil) Dori	**(Serbia) Lazar Arsić**		(Hong Kong) Tsui Wang Kit	(Brazil) Chiquinho (Cameroon) John Mary
Nantong Zhiyun	(Cameroon) Marius Obekop	**(Portugal) João Silva**	(Serbia) Mladen Kovačević		(Cameroon) Anatole Abang
Qingdao Huanghai	(Brazil) Cléo	**(Ivory Coast) Yaya Touré**	(Portugal) Ricardo Vaz Tê	(Chinese Taipei) Yaki Yen	(Spain) Joan Verdú
Shaanxi Chang'an Athletic	(Albania) Albi Alla	(Democratic Republic of the Congo) Oscar Maritu	**(Nigeria) John Owoeri**		(Brazil) Guto
Shanghai Shenxin	**(Brazil) Alex**	(The Gambia) Pa Dibba	**(Senegal) Aladji Mansour Ba**		(Peru) Roberto Siucho
Shijiazhuang Ever Bright	(Bolivia) Marcelo Moreno	(Brazil) Matheus	(Brazil) Muriqui		
Sichuan Longfor	**(Brazil) Jonathan Balotelli**	(Nigeria) Aaron Samuel			(Brazil) Evandro Paulista (Serbia) Nikola Petković
Xinjiang Tianshan Leopard	(Brazil) Stefano Pinho	**(Brazil) Naldinho**	(Latvia) Ritus Krjauklis		
Zhejiang Greentown	(Brazil) Rafael Martins	(South Africa) Dino Ndlovu	**(Zimbabwe) Nyasha Mushekwi**	(Chinese Taipei) Chen Po-liang	(Spain) Tana

- **^1** A club could register one non-naturalized player from the Hong Kong Football Association, Macau Football Association or Chinese Taipei Football Association as native player.
- **^2**Foreign players who left their clubs or were sent to reserve team after the first half of the season.

== League table ==
Pos	Team	Pld	W	D	L	GF	GA	GD	Pts	Promotion, qualification or relegation
1	Qingdao Huanghai (C, P)	30	17	6	7	59	36	+23	57	Promotion to Super League
2	Shijiazhuang Ever Bright (P)	30	18	2	10	59	42	+17	56	Promotion to Super League
3	Guizhou Hengfeng	30	17	3	10	46	28	+18	54 (Note: Guizhou Hengfeng is ahead of Heilongjiang Lava Spring on head-to-head goal difference: Guizhou Hengfeng 2–0 Heilongjiang Lava Spring, Heilongjiang Lava Spring 2–1 Guizhou Hengfeng.)	
4	Heilongjiang Lava Spring	30	15	9	6	46	34	+12	54	
5	Changchun Yatai	30	15	8	7	52	42	+10	53	
6	Zhejiang Greentown	30	14	9	7	49	40	+9	51 (Note: Zhejiang Greentown is ahead of Inner Mongolia Zhongyou on head-to-head points: Zhejiang Greentown 2–0 Inner Mongolia Zhongyou, Inner Mongolia Zhongyou 1–1 Zhejiang Greentown.)	
7	Inner Mongolia Zhongyou	30	15	6	9	35	30	+5	51	
8	Beijing BSU	30	13	7	10	51	30	+21	46	
9	Shaanxi Chang'an Athletic	30	13	5	12	39	37	+2	44	
10	Meizhou Hakka	30	11	6	13	44	41	+3	39	
11	Guangdong South China Tiger (Note: Guangdong South China Tiger was dissolved after failing to submit the salary & bonus confirmation form.) (D, R)	30	10	6	14	41	50	−9	36	Disbanded after season
12	Nantong Zhiyun	30	8	9	13	35	38	−3	33 (Note: Nantong Zhiyun is ahead of Xinjiang Tianshan Leopard on head-to-head points: Nantong Zhiyun 4–2 Xinjiang Tianshan Leopard, Xinjiang Tianshan Leopard 2–2 Nantong Zhiyun.)	
13	Xinjiang Tianshan Leopard	30	9	6	15	39	55	−16	33	
14	Sichuan Longfor (Note: Sichuan Longfor was dissolved after failing to submit the salary & bonus confirmation form.) (D, R)	30	8	7	15	36	52	−16	31	Disbanded after season
15	Liaoning F.C. (D)	30	5	6	19	33	57	−24	21	Disbanded after season
16	Shanghai Shenxin (Note: Shanghai Shenxin was dissolved after failing to submit the salary & bonus confirmation form.) (R, D)	30	3	3	24	30	82	−52	12	Disbanded after season

Source: CFA
Rules for classification: 1) Points; 2) Head-to-head points; 3) Head-to-head goal difference; 4) Head-to-head goals scored; 5) Reserve league points; 6) Goal difference; 7) Goals scored; 8) Disciplinary points (1 point for each yellow card, 3 points for each red card); 9) Draw
(C) Champions; (D) Disqualified; (P) Promoted; (R) Relegated

== Results ==
Home \ Away	BSU	CC	GDS	GZH	HLJ	IMZ	LN	MZK	NTZ	QDH	SCA	SHS	SJZ	SCL	XJT	ZJG
Beijing BSU	—	0–1	5–0	1–0	1–1	0–2	3–1	3–1	0–1	3–1	3–0	5–1	1–0	5–3	3–1	2–2
Changchun Yatai	1–4	—	2–0	2–1	1–1	0–2	1–1	5–1	1–0	1–1	3–2	1–1	3–2	1–0	1–2	1–1
Guangdong South China Tiger	0–0	1–1	—	1–2	2–3	1–2	1–1	2–3	3–2	2–3	0–1	1–0	1–1	1–1	2–0	2–2
Guizhou Hengfeng	2–0	2–1	1–0	—	2–0	2–1	0–0	2–0	2–0	1–0	0–0	1–4	2–1	1–2	5–0	6–2
Heilongjiang Lava Spring	2–2	4–1	2–1	2–1	—	0–0	2–0	2–1	0–0	1–0	0–0	3–1	3–2	1–1	4–2	1–1
Inner Mongolia Zhongyou	1–0	1–3	5–1	1–0	0–2	—	1–0	1–1	1–1	1–2	1–0	3–1	2–0	1–0	0–0	1–1
Liaoning F.C.	0–0	1–2	1–3	1–1	2–4	0–1	—	2–3	3–2	2–3	0–3	4–1	0–2	0–2	1–1	1–2
Meizhou Hakka	1–0	1–1	0–1	0–1	1–2	2–2	2–0	—	1–1	2–2	1–0	2–0	4–5	0–0	4–0	1–2
Nantong Zhiyun	0–0	0–1	1–2	1–2	0–2	1–0	1–2	0–2	—	1–1	3–0	1–2	2–2	1–0	4–2	0–0
Qingdao Huanghai	1–0	2–3	3–2	2–1	3–0	4–0	3–1	1–0	1–2	—	0–0	9–2	2–1	3–1	0–0	1–1
Shaanxi Chang'an Athletic	2–1	1–2	1–3	1–0	0–1	0–1	3–0	0–1	3–2	3–0	—	2–0	3–4	6–3	1–0	0–0
Shanghai Shenxin	1–2	1–4	2–4	0–1	2–1	0–1	1–4	1–7	0–3	0–2	2–3	—	0–2	0–0	0–1	1–2
Shijiazhuang Ever Bright	0–5	3–2	0–1	2–1	2–0	3–0	2–1	1–0	2–1	1–0	5–0	3–2	—	6–1	2–0	2–1
Sichuan Longfor	1–1	1–0	0–2	1–2	2–0	1–0	3–2	2–1	0–0	1–2	0–2	1–1	2–3	—	4–2	1–2
Xinjiang Tianshan Leopard	1–0	3–4	3–0	1–0	1–1	2–3	0–1	2–0	2–2	2–5	1–1	4–3	1–0	3–0	—	2–3
Zhejiang Greentown	2–1	2–2	2–1	1–4	2–1	2–0	4–1	0–1	1–2	1–2	0–1	5–0	1–0	3–2	1–0	—

Source: CFA
Legend: Blue = home team win; Yellow = draw; Red = away team win.
For upcoming matches, an "a" indicates there is an article about the rivalry between the two participants.

== Positions by round ==
To preserve chronological evolvements, any postponed matches are not included to the round at which they were originally scheduled, but added to the full round they were played immediately afterwards. For example, if a match is scheduled for round 7, but then played between rounds 8 and 9, it will be added to the standings for round 8.

Team ╲ Round	1	2	3	4	5	6	7	8	9	10	11	12	13	14	15	16	17	18	19	20	21	22	23	24	25	26	27	28	29	30
Qingdao Huanghai	3	11	11	5	2	1	1	1	1	1	1	1	1	1	1	1	1	1	1	4	2	4	3	2	2	1	1	1	1	1
Shijiazhuang Ever Bright	4	2	7	2	5	3	5	3	5	4	4	2	3	2	3	4	6	5	5	6	6	5	4	3	4	4	4	4	3	2
Guizhou Hengfeng	8	4	3	1	4	6	9	5	4	3	3	5	2	4	2	3	3	3	3	3	4	3	1	1	1	2	2	3	2	3
Heilongjiang Lava Spring	5	10	12	14	14	14	12	12	13	14	11	11	10	10	9	10	10	8	7	7	8	8	8	8	7	6	6	5	5	4
Changchun Yatai	1	7	6	9	10	8	11	10	6	8	6	7	6	7	8	7	4	4	4	2	1	1	2	4	3	3	3	2	4	5
Zhejiang Greentown	11	9	4	6	3	2	4	6	7	6	7	4	5	3	6	5	7	7	9	8	7	7	7	7	6	5	5	7	6	6
Inner Mongolia Zhongyou	13	15	13	10	6	7	8	9	10	10	10	9	8	6	4	2	2	2	2	1	3	2	5	5	8	7	7	6	7	7
Beijing BSU	12	12	14	15	12	13	10	7	8	7	8	8	7	9	10	8	5	6	6	5	5	6	6	6	5	8	8	8	8	8
Shaanxi Chang'an Athletic	14	8	1	3	8	11	7	11	12	13	14	12	14	12	11	11	12	9	8	9	9	9	9	9	9	9	9	9	9	9
Meizhou Hakka	6	1	5	8	9	5	3	4	3	5	5	6	9	8	5	6	8	10	10	12	11	11	11	10	10	10	10	11	10	10
Guangdong South China Tiger	2	3	2	4	1	4	2	2	2	2	2	3	4	5	7	9	11	11	12	10	10	10	10	11	11	11	11	10	11	11
Nantong Zhiyun	10	14	16	13	13	15	15	14	14	12	9	13	13	11	12	13	13	13	13	13	13	13	13	14	14	14	14	14	14	12
Xinjiang Tianshan Leopard	15	16	15	16	16	16	16	16	16	16	15	15	12	13	13	12	9	12	11	11	12	12	12	12	12	12	12	12	12	13
Sichuan Longfor	7	6	8	7	11	9	6	8	9	9	12	10	11	14	14	14	15	15	14	15	15	14	14	13	13	13	13	13	13	14
Liaoning F.C.	9	5	10	11	7	10	13	13	11	11	13	14	15	15	15	15	14	14	15	14	14	15	15	15	15	15	15	15	15	15
Shanghai Shenxin	16	13	9	12	15	12	14	15	15	15	16	16	16	16	16	16	16	16	16	16	16	16	16	16	16	16	16	16	16	16

Leader and promotion to Super League
Runner-up and promotion to Super League
Qualification to Relegation play-offs
Relegation to League Two
Disbanded after season

Source: CFA

== Results by match played ==
Team ╲ Round	1	2	3	4	5	6	7	8	9	10	11	12	13	14	15	16	17	18	19	20	21	22	23	24	25	26	27	28	29	30
Beijing BSU	L	D	L	D	W	D	W	W	L	W	D	D	W	L	L	W	W	L	W	W	W	L	L	W	W	L	D	L	D	W
Changchun Yatai	W	L	W	L	D	D	L	W	W	D	W	L	W	D	D	D	W	W	W	W	W	W	L	L	W	D	W	W	D	L
Guangdong South China Tiger	W	D	W	L	W	D	W	W	L	W	D	L	D	L	D	L	L	D	L	W	L	W	L	L	L	W	L	W	L	L
Guizhou Hengfeng	D	W	W	W	L	L	L	W	W	W	D	L	W	L	W	D	L	W	W	W	W	W	W	W	L	L	W	L	W	L
Heilongjiang Lava Spring	W	L	L	L	D	D	W	D	D	L	W	D	W	W	D	D	D	W	W	W	W	L	W	L	W	W	D	W	W	W
Inner Mongolia Zhongyou	L	L	W	W	W	L	D	D	D	L	D	W	W	W	W	W	W	W	L	W	L	W	L	L	D	D	W	W	L	W
Liaoning F.C.	D	W	L	D	W	L	L	L	W	D	L	L	D	L	L	D	W	L	L	D	L	L	L	W	L	L	L	L	L	L
Meizhou Hakka	W	W	L	L	D	W	W	L	W	D	D	L	L	W	W	L	L	L	D	L	D	L	W	W	L	D	L	L	W	W
Nantong Zhiyun	L	L	L	W	D	L	L	W	L	W	W	L	D	W	D	D	L	L	D	L	D	L	L	L	D	D	W	W	D	W
Qingdao Huanghai	W	L	D	W	W	W	W	W	W	D	L	W	L	W	D	D	D	W	L	L	W	L	W	W	W	D	W	W	W	L
Shaanxi Chang'an Athletic	L	W	W	D	L	L	W	L	L	L	D	W	L	W	W	D	D	W	W	L	L	W	W	L	W	W	L	L	D	W
Shanghai Shenxin	L	D	W	L	L	W	L	L	L	L	L	L	L	L	L	D	D	L	L	L	L	L	W	L	L	L	L	L	L	L
Shijiazhuang Ever Bright	W	W	L	W	L	W	L	W	L	W	D	W	L	W	L	D	L	W	W	L	W	W	W	W	L	L	W	W	W	W
Sichuan Longfor	W	D	L	W	L	D	W	L	D	L	L	W	L	L	L	L	D	D	D	L	L	W	L	W	W	D	L	W	L	L
Xinjiang Tianshan Leopard	L	L	D	L	L	D	D	L	W	L	W	W	W	L	W	W	W	L	D	D	L	L	W	L	L	W	L	L	D	L
Zhejiang Greentown	L	W	W	D	W	W	L	L	D	W	D	W	D	D	D	D	D	L	L	W	W	W	L	W	W	W	W	L	D	W

Source: CFA
W = Win; D = Draw; L = Loss

== Relegation play-offs ==
Team 1	Agg.	Team 2	1st leg	2nd leg
Hebei Aoli Jingying	2–3	Sichuan Longfor	1–0	1–3
Liaoning F.C.	1–1	Suzhou Dongwu	0–0	1–1

6 November 2019
15:00

Hebei Aoli Jingying	1–0	Sichuan Longfor
Hou Zhe 66'

Referee: Wan Tao (China)

Assistant referees:
Ma Kexin(China)
Zhang Haijun (China)
Fourth official:
Sun Shengyu (China)
Video assistant referee:
Gao Peng (China)
Assistant video assistant referees:

Wang Wei (China)
10 November 2019
19:30

Sichuan Longfor	3–1	Hebei Aoli Jingying
Wang Qi 31'; Qu Cheng 45'; Zhang Jingyang 45+1'		Wu Linfeng 56'

Referee: Milorad Mažić (Serbia)

Assistant referees:
Sun Kai (China)
Jiao Wei (China)
Fourth official:
Cui Yong (China)
Video assistant referee:
Fu Ming (China)
Assistant video assistant referees:

Zhao Honglei (China)

6 November 2019
14:30

Liaoning F.C.	0–0	Suzhou Dongwu

Referee: Zhang Xiaochen (China)

Assistant referees:
Meng Xiangkun(China)
Zhong Yong (China)
Fourth official:
Han Lei (China)
Video assistant referee:
Zhu Wenbin (China)
Assistant video assistant referees:

Zhao Boyang(China)
10 November 2019
19:30

Suzhou Dongwu	1–1	Liaoning F.C.
Li Zhi 57'		Song Chen 45'

Referee: Mark Clattenburg (England)

Assistant referees:
Guo Jingtao(China)
Tang Rongdi (China)
Fourth official:
Lin Chentao (China)
Video assistant referee:
Zhang Long (China)
Assistant video assistant referees:

Ning Zhaobing (China)

== Statistics ==
=== Top scorers ===
As of 2 November 2019

Rank	Player	Club	Goals
1	(Democratic Republic of the Congo) Oscar Maritu	Shaanxi Chang'an Athletic	22
2	(Ivory Coast) Gerard Gohou	Beijing BSU	21
2	(Brazil) Muriqui	Shijiazhuang Ever Bright	21
4	(China) Tan Long	Changchun Yatai	19
4	(Nigeria) Aaron Samuel	Sichuan Longfor	19
6	(South Africa) Dino Ndlovu	Zhejiang Greentown	17
7	(Croatia) Anton Maglica	Guizhou Hengfeng	16
8	(Nigeria) Daniel Chima	Heilongjiang Lava Spring	15
8	(Netherlands) Richairo Zivkovic	Changchun Yatai	15
10	(Brazil) Cléo	Qingdao Huanghai	14

=== Hat-tricks ===
Player	For	Against	Result	Date	Ref
(China) Tan Long	Changchun Yatai	Shanghai Shenxin	4–1 (A)	9 March 2019	
(Democratic Republic of the Congo) Oscar Maritu	Shaanxi Chang'an Athletic	Liaoning F.C.	3–0 (A)	30 March 2019	
(Ivory Coast) Gerard Gohou	Beijing BSU	Changchun Yatai	4–1 (A)	28 April 2019	
(Netherlands) Richairo Zivkovic	Changchun Yatai	Xinjiang Tianshan Leopard	4–3 (A)	4 May 2019	
(Croatia) Anton Maglica	Guizhou Hengfeng	Zhejiang Greentown	6–2 (H)	5 May 2019	
(Brazil) Cléo	Qingdao Huanghai	Shanghai Shenxin	9–2 (H)	22 June 2019	
(Cameroon) John Mary	Meizhou Hakka	Shanghai Shenxin	7–1 (A)	29 June 2019	
(Ivory Coast) Gerard Gohou	Beijing BSU	Guangdong South China Tiger	5–0 (H)	14 July 2019	
(Ivory Coast) Gerard Gohou	Beijing BSU	Liaoning F.C.	5–0 (H)	27 July 2019	
(Nigeria) Aaron Samuel	Sichuan Longfor	Beijing BSU	3–5 (A)	10 August 2019	
(Brazil) Muriqui	Guizhou Hengfeng	Changchun Yatai	3–2 (H)	31 August 2019	
(Brazil) Sérgio Mota	Shijiazhuang Ever Bright	Xinjiang Tianshan Leopard	5–0 (H)	28 September 2019	
(Brazil) Jonathan Balotelli	Sichuan Longfor	Xinjiang Tianshan Leopard	4–2 (H)	19 October 2019	
(Democratic Republic of the Congo) Oscar Maritu^{4}	Shaanxi Chang'an Athletic	Sichuan Longfor	6–3 (H)	2 November 2019	

== Awards ==
The awards of 2019 China League One were announced on 20 November 2011.

- Most valuable player: (China) Tan Long (Changchun Yatai)
- Golden Boot: (Democratic Republic of the Congo) Oscar Maritu (Shaanxi Chang'an Athletic)
- Best goalkeeper: (China) Xu Jiamin (Heilongjiang Lava Spring)
- Young Player of the Year: (China) Xu Yue (Shanghai Shenxin)
- Best coach: (China) Wang Bo (Shaanxi Chang'an Athletic)
- Fair play award: Beijing BSU, Zhejiang Greentown, Heilongjiang Lava Spring
- Best referee: (China) Wan Tao

== League attendance ==
Pos	Team	Total	High	Low	Average	Change
1	Shaanxi Chang'an Athletic^{††}	365,651	27,339	19,876	24,377	+43.4%
2	Shijiazhuang Ever Bright	262,313	35,613	13,156	17,488	+41.0%
3	Changchun Yatai^{†}	206,765	26,956	7,434	13,784	−26.8%
4	Qingdao Huanghai	198,489	31,986	6,136	13,233	+99.4%
5	Nantong Zhiyun^{††}	165,122	13,863	7,062	11,008	+20.6%
6	Heilongjiang Lava Spring	155,156	15,689	7,017	10,344	−23.6%
7	Zhejiang Greentown	130,177	18,910	5,827	8,678	−0.4%
8	Inner Mongolia Zhongyou	128,565	22,128	4,023	8,571	+53.8%
9	Guizhou Hengfeng^{†}	124,031	20,609	4,125	8,269	−50.5%
10	Guangdong South China Tiger	114,995	10,836	4,679	7,666	+17.0%
11	Sichuan Longfor^{††}	94,692	9,819	3,101	6,313	+29.6%
12	Meizhou Hakka	89,758	10,898	4,368	5,984	+67.0%
13	Beijing BSU	65,848	10,856	2,105	4,390	+110.8%
14	Xinjiang Tianshan Leopard	53,476	7,621	1,707	3,565	+200.3%
15	Liaoning F.C.	49,961	5,807	1,825	3,331	−17.5%
16	Shanghai Shenxin	27,306	3,358	815	1,820	−50.7%
	League total	2,232,305	35,613	815	9,301	+52.9%

Updated to games played on November 2nd, 2019
Source: League attendance
Notes:
^{†} Teams played previous season in CSL.
^{††} Teams played previous season in CL2.
