= Zhang Jingyang =

Chinese footballer

Zhang Jingyang 张靖洋
Personal information
- Date of birth: January 25, 1989 (age 37)
- Place of birth: Kunming, Yunnan, China
- Height: 1.76 m (5 ft 9 1/2 in)
- Position: Midfielder

Team information
- Current team: Heilongjiang Ice City

Youth career
- Harbin Yiteng

Senior career*
Years	Team	Apps	(Gls)
2006–2010	Harbin Yiteng	21	(2)
2011	Fushun Xinye	16	(7)
2012–2016	Liaoning Whowin	43	(3)
2017–2019	Sichuan Longfor	64	(13)
2020–2021	Chengdu Better City	10	(0)
2021	→ Sichuan Minzu (loan)	12	(0)
2022-	Heilongjiang Ice City	0	(0)
- * Club domestic league appearances and goals as of 28 April 2022

Zhang Jingyang (Chinese: 张靖洋; born 25 January 1989) is a Chinese football player who currently plays for Heilongjiang Ice City in the China League One.

== Club career ==
In 2006, Zhang Jingyang started his professional footballer career with Harbin Yiteng in the China League Two. In February 2011, Sun transferred to China League Two side Fushun Xinye. In January 2012, Sun transferred to Chinese Super League side Liaoning Whowin. He would eventually make his league debut for Liaoning on 10 March 2012 in a game against Henan Jianye.

On 24 January 2017, Zhang moved to League Two side Sichuan Longfor.

== Club career statistics ==
Statistics accurate as of match played 31 December 2020.

Appearances and goals by club, season and competition
Club	Season	League			National Cup		Continental		Other		Total	
Club	Season	Division	Apps	Goals	Apps	Goals	Apps	Goals	Apps	Goals	Apps	Goals
Harbin Yiteng	2006	China League Two			-		-		-			
Harbin Yiteng	2007	China League One	17	2	-		-		-		17	2
Harbin Yiteng	2008	China League One	4	0	-		-		-		4	0
Harbin Yiteng	2009	China League Two			-		-		-			
Harbin Yiteng	2010	China League Two			-		-		-			
Harbin Yiteng	Total		21	2	0	0	0	0	0	0	21	2
Fushun Xinye	2011	China League Two	16	7	-		-		-		16	7
Liaoning Whowin	2012	Chinese Super League	19	3	2	0	-		-		21	3
Liaoning Whowin	2013	Chinese Super League	11	0	2	0	-		-		13	0
Liaoning Whowin	2014	Chinese Super League	8	0	0	0	-		-		8	0
Liaoning Whowin	2015	Chinese Super League	4	0	0	0	-		-		4	0
Liaoning Whowin	2016	Chinese Super League	1	0	2	1	-		-		3	1
Liaoning Whowin	Total		43	3	6	1	0	0	0	0	49	4
Sichuan Longfor	2017	China League Two	12	1	1	0	-		-		13	1
Sichuan Longfor	2018	China League Two	27	10	2	0	-		-		29	10
Sichuan Longfor	2019	China League One	23	1	0	0	-		2 (Note: Appearance(s) in CL1 Relegation play-offs)	1	25	2
Sichuan Longfor	Total		62	12	3	0	0	0	2	1	68	13
Chengdu Better City	2020	China League One	10	0	0	0	-		-		10	0
Career total			152	24	9	1	0	0	2	1	163	26
