= Qu Cheng =

Chinese footballer

Qu Cheng 渠成
Personal information
- Full name: Qu Cheng
- Date of birth: 8 February 1989 (age 37)
- Place of birth: Nanjing, Jiangsu, China
- Height: 1.88 m (6 ft 2 in)
- Position: Forward

Team information
- Current team: Nanjing City

Senior career*
Years	Team	Apps	(Gls)
2009–2016	Jiangsu Sainty	25	(1)
2010	→ Persipura Jayapura (loan)	8	(3)
2014	→ Jiangxi Liansheng (loan)	13	(6)
2016	→ Sichuan Longfor (loan)	10	(3)
2017–2020	Sichuan Longfor	72	(32)
2020–2022	Wuhan Three Towns	29	(4)
2023	Nanjing City	9	(0)
2024–	Jiangsu Landhouse Dong Victory	2	(1)
- * Club domestic league appearances and goals as of 1 June 2024

Qu Cheng (Chinese: 渠成; born 8 February 1989) is a Chinese footballer who plays as a striker for Chinese Champions League club Jiangsu Landhouse Dong Victory.

== Club career ==
Qu Cheng started his football career playing for the Jiangsu Sainty F.C. youth team before being promoted to their senior squad in the 2009 Chinese Super League season and would go on to make his debut in a league game on 16 May 2009 against Hangzhou Greentown in a 4-0 defeat. Qu would be loaned out to Indonesian Premier League side Persipura Jayapura halfway through their 2009–10 league season and would go on to make his debut on 13 March 2010 in a league game on against PSPS Pekanbaru where he came on as a substitute for Yustinus Pae in a 1–0 victory. As the season progressed Qu would make several further appearances and would soon score his first goal on April 3, 2010 in a league game against Bontang FC in 5–1 victory. By the end of the season Qu scored three goals in eight appearances in the league as well as two goals in three appearances within the 2010 Piala Indonesia before returning to China.

On 8 July 2014, Qu was loaned to China League Two side Jiangxi Liansheng until 31 December 2014. He would be loaned out again on 23 June 2016, to China League Two side Sichuan Longfor until 31 December 2016. He made a permanent transfer to Sichuan Longfor on 14 February 2017. He would go on to win the 2018 China League Two season with them and promotion to the second tier.

On August 8, 2020, Qu transferred to Wuhan Three Towns. In his first season with the club he would go on to aid them in winning the division title and promotion into the second tier. This would be followed by another division title win and promotion as the club entered the top tier for the first tine in their history. The following campaign he would be part of the squad that won the 2022 Chinese Super League title.

== Career statistics ==
Statistics accurate as of match played 11 January 2023.

Appearances and goals by club, season and competition
Club	Season	League			National Cup		Continental		Other		Total	
Club	Season	Division	Apps	Goals	Apps	Goals	Apps	Goals	Apps	Goals	Apps	Goals
Jiangsu Sainty	2009	Chinese Super League	1	0	-		-		-		1	0
Jiangsu Sainty	2011	Chinese Super League	3	0	1	0	-		-		4	0
Jiangsu Sainty	2012	Chinese Super League	14	1	1	0	-		-		15	1
Jiangsu Sainty	2013	Chinese Super League	6	0	0	0	1	0	1 (Note: Appearance(s) in Chinese FA Super Cup)	0	8	0
Jiangsu Sainty	2015	Chinese Super League	1	0	2	0	-		-		3	0
Jiangsu Sainty	2016	Chinese Super League	0	0	1	0	1	0	0	0	2	0
Jiangsu Sainty	Total		25	1	5	0	2	0	1	0	33	1
Persipura Jayapura (loan)	2009–10	Indonesia Super League	8	3	3	2	0	0	-		11	5
Jiangxi Liansheng (loan)	2014	China League Two	13	6	0	0	-		-		13	6
Sichuan Longfor (loan)	2016	China League Two	10	3	0	0	-		-		10	3
Sichuan Longfor	2017	China League Two	23	13	0	0	-		-		22	0
Sichuan Longfor	2018	China League Two	25	17	3	2	-		-		28	19
Sichuan Longfor	2019	China League One	24	2	0	0	-		2 (Note: Appearance(s) in CL1 Relegation play-offs)	1	26	3
Sichuan Longfor	Total		72	32	3	2	0	0	2	1	77	35
Wuhan Three Towns	2020	China League Two	12	2	-		-		-		12	2
Wuhan Three Towns	2021	China League One	14	2	2	0	-		-		16	2
Wuhan Three Towns	2022	Chinese Super League	3	0	1	1	-		-		4	1
Wuhan Three Towns	Total		29	4	3	1	0	0	0	0	32	4
Career total			157	49	14	5	2	0	3	1	176	55

== Honours ==
=== Club ===
Jiangsu Sainty

- Chinese FA Super Cup: 2013

Sichuan Longfor

- China League Two: 2018

Wuhan Three Towns

- Chinese Super League: 2022.
- China League One: 2021
- China League Two: 2020
