= Yang Hao (footballer, born 1990) =

Chinese footballer

Yang Hao 杨浩
Personal information
- Date of birth: 13 May 1990 (age 36)
- Place of birth: Xuzhou, Jiangsu, China
- Height: 1.81 m (5 ft 11 1/2 in)
- Position: Midfielder

Team information
- Current team: Nanjing City F.C.
- Number: 11

Youth career
- Jiangsu Youth

Senior career*
Years	Team	Apps	(Gls)
2010–2014	Chengdu Tiancheng	45	(0)
2015–2018	Baoding Yingli Yitong	84	(13)
2019–	Shenzhen Pengcheng	31	(1)
2020–	Nanjing City F.C.	10	(1)
- * Club domestic league appearances and goals as of 31 December 2020

Yang Hao (Chinese: 杨浩; born 13 May 1990) is a Chinese football player who currently plays for China League One side Nanjing City F.C.

== Club career ==
In 2010, Yang Hao started his professional footballer career with Chengdu Tiancheng in the China League One and was part of the team that gained promotion to the top tier at the end of the season. He would make his first Chinese Super League appearance for Chengdu on 24 April 2011 in a game against Nanchang Bayi, coming on as a substitute for Zhang Yuan in the 79th minute. Throughout the season he would go on to establish himself as a regular within the team, however he was part of the squad that was immediately relegated back into the second tier at the end of the 2011 Chinese Super League campaign. By the end of the 2014 China League One season the club experienced another relegation and were dissolved due to wage arrears.

On 1 July 2015, Yang transferred to China League Two side Baoding Yingli Yitong. He would go on to establish himself as a vital member of the team and gained promotion with them at the end of the 2016 China League Two campaign as they came runners-up within the league. The following season he would unfortunately be part of the team that was relegated on head-to-head results against Dalian Transcendence F.C. at the end of the 2017 China League One campaign.

== Career statistics ==
Statistics accurate as of match played 31 December 2020.

Appearances and goals by club, season and competition
Club	Season	League			National Cup		Continental		Other		Total	
Club	Season	Division	Apps	Goals	Apps	Goals	Apps	Goals	Apps	Goals	Apps	Goals
Chengdu Tiancheng	2010	China League One	5	0	-		-		-		5	0
Chengdu Tiancheng	2011	Chinese Super League	12	0	1	0	-		-		13	0
Chengdu Tiancheng	2012	China League One	11	0	2	1	-		-		13	1
Chengdu Tiancheng	2013	China League One	4	0	1	0	-		-		5	0
Chengdu Tiancheng	2014	China League One	13	0	1	0	-		-		14	0
Chengdu Tiancheng	Total		45	0	5	1	0	0	0	0	50	1
Baoding Yingli Yitong	2015	China League Two	6	1	-		-		-		6	1
Baoding Yingli Yitong	2016	China League Two	23	5	2	0	-		-		25	5
Baoding Yingli Yitong	2017	China League One	29	1	0	0	-		-		29	1
Baoding Yingli Yitong	2018	China League Two	26	6	1	1	-		-		27	7
Baoding Yingli Yitong	Total		84	13	3	1	0	0	0	0	87	14
Shenzhen Pengcheng	2019	China League Two	31	1	1	0	-		-		32	1
Nanjing City F.C.	2020	China League Two	10	1	-		-		-		10	1
Career total			170	15	9	2	0	0	0	0	179	17
