= Oscar Maritu =

Congolese footballer (born 1999)

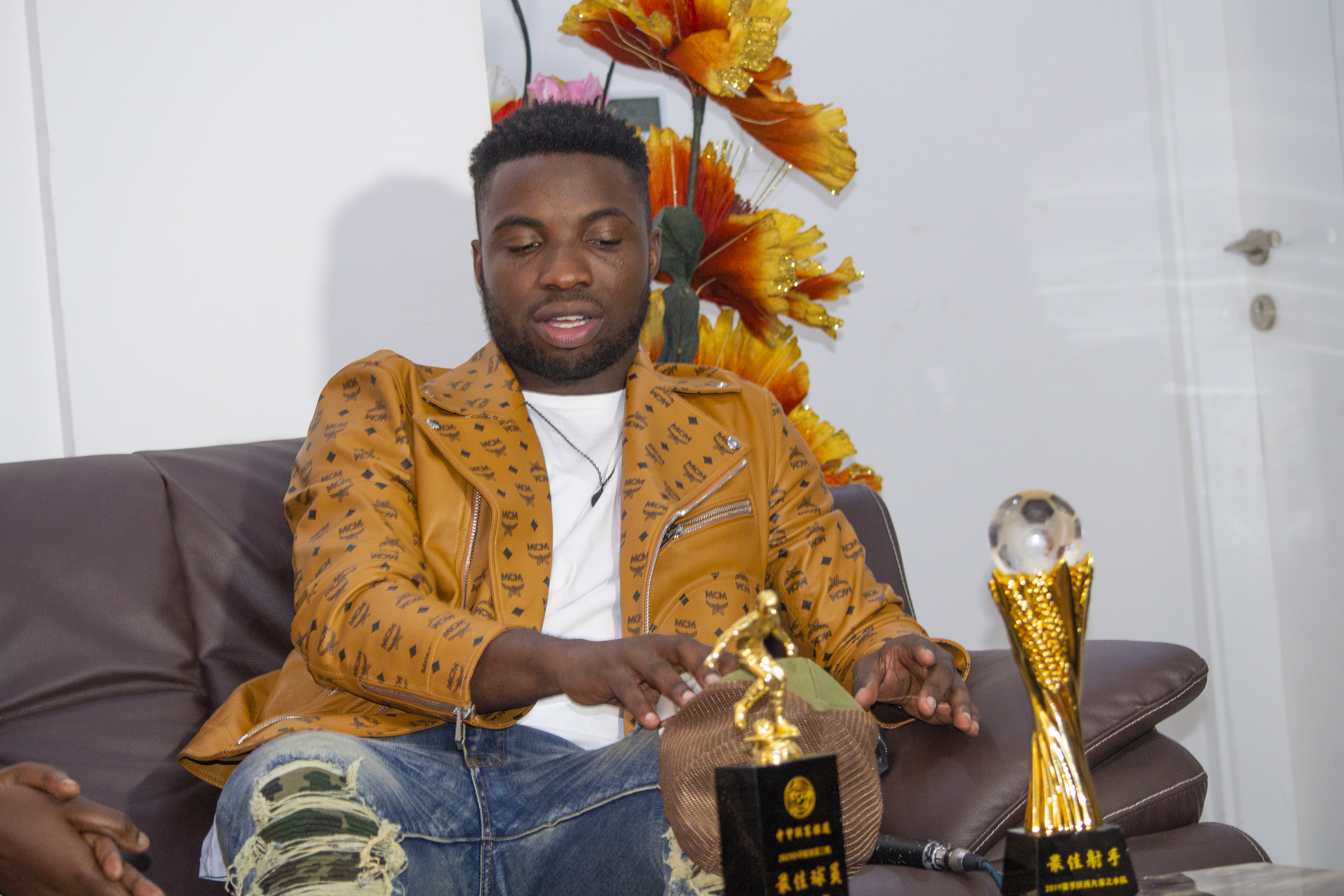

Personal information
- Full name: Oscar Taty Maritu
- Date of birth: 17 August 1999 (age 27)
- Place of birth: DR Congo
- Height: 1.82 m (6 ft 0 in)
- Position: Striker

Team information
- Current team: Yunnan Yukun
- Number: 11

Youth career
- 2017–2018: Yanbian Funde

Senior career*
Years	Team	Apps	(Gls)
2018	Yanbian Funde	15	(10)
2019	Shaanxi Chang'an Athletic	26	(22)
2020–2024	Cangzhou Mighty Lions	114	(28)
2025–	Yunnan Yukun	56	(32)
- * Club domestic league appearances and goals as of 31 May 2026

Oscar Taty Maritu (born August 17, 1999) is a Congolese professional footballer currently playing as a striker for Yunnan Yukun in the Chinese Super League.

Maritu began his youth career at Yanbian Funde before moving into their senior team in 2018. He later played for Shaanxi Chang'an Athletic. From 2020 to 2024, Maritu represented Cangzhou Mighty Lions in the Chinese Super League, registering 32 goals in 117 appearances.

== Club career ==
=== Yanbian Funde ===
On 11 July 2018, Yanbian FC officially signed Oscar. It was reported that Oscar had been training with Yanbian youth team since 2017. He had his debut goal on 18 July against Shijiazhaung Ever Bright. For the 2018 season, he scored 10 goals in 15 matches, saving Yanbian from the relegation area.

=== Shaanxi Chang'an Athletics ===
Upon Yanbian's bankruptcy shortly before the 2019 season, Oscar was released and joined Shaanxi Chang'an Athletics on a free transfer. He scored twice to help Shaanxi win their first League One match.

=== Cangzhou Mighty Lions ===
On 17 February 2020, Oscar has signed a contract with newly promoted Chinese Super League club Cangzhou Mighty Lions after a reported transfer fee of 15 million Chinese yuan (around 2.15 million U.S. dollars). He would make his debut for the club in a league game on 26 July 2020 against Hebei in a 2–2 draw. This would be followed by his first goal for the club on 1 August 2020 in a league game against Qingdao Huanghai in a 2–2 draw. With the step up in quality, Maritu would not be as prolific, this would be exasperated when on 4 December 2022 after being awarded a penalty he decided to feint the ball, resulting in a foul against him as Cangzhou ultimately lost the game 4–0.

=== Yunnan Yukun ===
After Cangzhou Mighty Lions dissolved after the 2024 season, Oscar joined Yunnan Yukun for the 2025 Chinese Super League. He ended the 2026 Chinese Super League season as the top scorer with 23 goals in 30 appearances.

== Career statistics ==
As of match played 31 May 2026.

Appearances and goals by club, season and competition
Club	Season	League			National Cup		Continental		Other		Total	
Club	Season	Division	Apps	Goals	Apps	Goals	Apps	Goals	Apps	Goals	Apps	Goals
Yanbian Funde	2018	China League One	15	10	0	0	—		—		15	10
Shaanxi Chang'an Athletic	2019	China League One	26	22	1	0	—		—		27	22
Shijiazhuang Ever Bright/ Cangzhou Mighty Lions	2020	Chinese Super League	17	2	0	0	—		—		17	2
Shijiazhuang Ever Bright/ Cangzhou Mighty Lions	2021	Chinese Super League	16	7	2	4	—		—		18	11
Shijiazhuang Ever Bright/ Cangzhou Mighty Lions	2022	Chinese Super League	29	6	0	0	—		—		29	6
Shijiazhuang Ever Bright/ Cangzhou Mighty Lions	2023	Chinese Super League	30	6	0	0	—		—		30	6
Shijiazhuang Ever Bright/ Cangzhou Mighty Lions	2024	Chinese Super League	22	7	1	0	—		—		23	7
Shijiazhuang Ever Bright/ Cangzhou Mighty Lions	Total		114	28	3	4	—		—		117	32
Yunnan Yukun	2025	Chinese Super League	26	9	4	3	—		—		30	12
Yunnan Yukun	2026	Chinese Super League	30	23	0	0	—		—		30	23
Yunnan Yukun	Total		56	32	4	3	—		—		60	35
Career total			211	92	8	7	0	0	0	0	219	99
