= U.D. Leiria =

Portuguese association football club

União de Leiria
- Full name: União Desportiva de Leiria
- Nicknames: Os Lis (The ones from the Lis river)
- Founded: 6 June 1966; 60 years ago
- Ground: Estádio Dr. Magalhães Pessoa
- Capacity: 23,888
- Chairman: Armando Marques
- Manager: Fábio Pereira
- League: Liga Portugal 2
- 2025–26: Liga Portugal 2, 6th of 18
- Website: www.uniaodeleiria.pt

União Desportiva de Leiria (Portuguese pronunciation: [uniˈɐ̃w dɨ lɐjˈɾiɐ]), commonly known as União de Leiria, is a Portuguese professional football club based in Leiria. Founded on 6 June 1966, it currently plays in the Liga Portugal 2, holding home matches at Estádio Dr. Magalhães Pessoa, with a 23,888-seat capacity.

== History ==
In 1979–80, the club first competed in the top division, finishing in 13th position and being relegated.

On 16 April 2001, the club appointed former Benfica manager José Mourinho on a two-year contract. In January 2002, having taken the team as high as third, he departed for Porto. His successor Mário Reis resigned after five games, having lost four, and the team concluded the season in seventh under Vítor Pontes.

The club lost the 2003 Taça de Portugal final to Mourinho's Porto, with the only goal coming from ex-União de Leiria striker Derlei. As the northern club had won the double of league and cup, União de Leiria were their opponents in the 2003 Supertaça Cândido de Oliveira on 10 August, with the same scoreline.

União de Leiria reached the 2004 UEFA Intertoto Cup final with Lille. After goalless draws in France and at home, the team lost 0–2 in extra time on 24 August. Three years later, the club won the same event with a 4–1 second-leg win over Serbia's Hajduk Kula reversing a 1–0 away loss. After defeating Israel's Maccabi Netanya by a single goal in the qualifying round, the club took on Bayer Leverkusen in the first round of the UEFA Cup, losing 5–4 on aggregate with a 3–2 home win in the second leg.

In 2007–08, the club was relegated to the second level, after finishing last; it was additionally involved in the Apito Dourado scandal. The team would be immediately promoted back, coming in second after champions Olhanense.

Former logo, in use until 2024.

The 2011–12 season was lived amongst serious financial difficulties, with the squad not being paid their wages for several months, as three coaching moves also happened during the campaign and president João Bartolomeu resigned amongst accusations of ingratitude towards the players. On 29 April 2012, after most of the squad rescinded their contracts, only eight players took the pitch for the league match at home against Feirense in an eventual 0–4 home loss. The side played the last two matches, against Benfica and Nacional, with a complete team, but three players came from the juniors. After failing to meet the deadline to register the team in Division Two, Leiria were automatically relegated to the third level. Overwhelmed with the task of rebuilding a squad from scratch, the organization hired several players in an attempt to return to the professionals, as a second senior team also begun competing in the Leiria regional leagues, coached by former club player Luís Bilro. On 28 June 2013, the UD Leiria SAD was declared bankrupt in a meeting of creditors, which demanded the payment of a debt amounting to €13.5 million, with the Portuguese state abstaining for demanding a debt of over €3.6 million. The second senior team that competed in the regional league took the place of the SAD by buying their sports rights for €1,000, with the club returning to the Estádio Dr. Magalhães Pessoa after playing their home matches at other grounds for two seasons.

In February 2015, at an extraordinary general assembly, UD Leiria would vote for the creation of another SAD, opening doors to the arrival of Alexander Tolstikov, who after João Bartolomeu would become the new "Lord" of Leiria. The club would have already had a SAD between 1999 and 2013, having been extinguished in the face of its high debt value. The SAD's initial share capital is 40% owned by UD Leiria and 60% owned by DS Investment LLP, of which Alexander Tolstikov is one of those responsible. Thus, DS Investment started to control the main football team and also the junior team.

In October 2020, after a vote at a general meeting, the members approved the entry of a new investor into the club's SAD: Armando Marques, a former director of Vitória de Guimarães. Furthermore, they waived their right of first refusal in the sale of 60% of DS Investment LLP, a company owned by Alexander Tolstikov, leading to their departure from the SAD structure.

In 2022–23, the club won Liga 3 and promotion to Liga Portugal 2. The team defeated Belenenses 1–0 at the Estádio Nacional to return to professional leagues for the first time since 2012.

Early 2026, the junior clubs of U.D. Leiria and Sporting wore shirts with "SOS Leiria" as a solidarity action for the Leiria district, as Storm Kristin devastated the area.

== Stadium ==
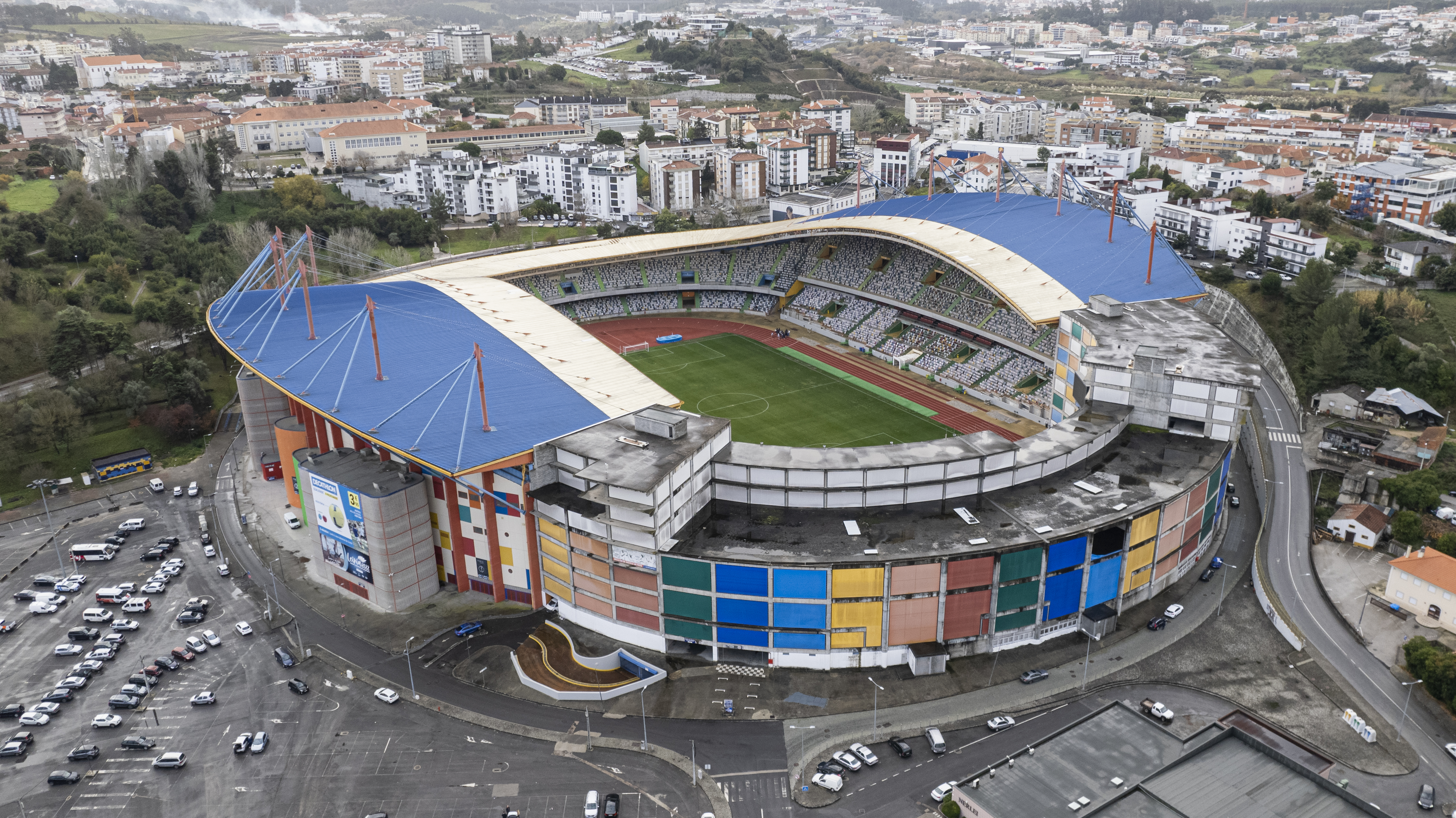
Estádio Dr. Magalhães Pessoa

The Estádio Dr. Magalhães Pessoa was built for UEFA Euro 2004 in 2003, hosting during the competition Croatia's matches against Switzerland (0–0) and France (2–2). It also hosted the 2006 Supertaça Cândido de Oliveira final between FC Porto and Vitória de Setúbal, as well as the following (Sporting CP 1–0 Porto).

The architect who designed the stadium was Tomás Taveira, who also designed stadiums for Euro 2004, including Beira-Mar's Estádio Municipal de Aveiro and Sporting CP's Estádio José Alvalade. The grounds belong to the municipality of Leiria.

Due to an excessive rent, Leiria relocated to the Estádio Municipal in the nearby town of Marinha Grande, for 2011–12. For the following season, the club moved to Campo da Portela in Santa Catarina da Serra, home of U.D. Serra.

After the SAD bankruptcy, the club returned to play its home matches at the Estádio Dr. Magalhães Pessoa.

The stadium was severely damaged in January 2026 as a result of Kristin.

== Fans ==
União's fans are called Leirienses or Unionistas, and their main group of supporters is Armata Ultra ("Armata Ultra").

Leiria's biggest rivals are Beira-Mar, Associação Naval 1º de Maio and Académica de Coimbra, which belong to the same geographical region.

== Players ==
=== Current squad ===
As of 18 September 2026

Note: Flags indicate national team as defined under FIFA eligibility rules; some limited exceptions apply. Players may hold more than one non-FIFA nationality.

No.	Pos.	Nation	Player
3	DF	ESP	Marc Baró
4	DF	BLR	Leo Mascaró
5	DF	POR	Miguel Nóbrega (on loan from Vitória de Guimarães)
6	MF	CIV	Eboue Kouassi
7	FW	GEQ	Nabil Ondo
8	MF	POR	Reko
9	FW	ESP	Juan Muñoz
10	FW	NED	Jordan van der Gaag
11	FW	BRA	Jair
13	GK	ESP	Yago Moreira
14	DF	ESP	Kikín
16	DF	POR	Zé Pedro
17	FW	ESP	Pablo Fernández
18	MF	BRA	Tharlley (on loan from Oliveira do Hospital)
19	MF	FRA	Albert Lottin
20	MF	POR	Bernardo Gomes
21	FW	POR	Jaiminho

No.	Pos.	Nation	Player
25	MF	POR	Diogo Amado (captain)
29	FW	FRA	Damien Loppy
42	DF	POR	Tomás Caturra
44	DF	BRA	Marcelo
68	DF	POR	Miguel Maga
70	DF	BEL	Hugo Masaki
77	FW	BUL	Borislav Rupanov (on loan from Górnik Zabrze)
78	FW	BRA	Victor Silva
79	FW	POR	Pedro Oliveira
80	GK	CUB	Christian Joel
82	FW	COD	Samuel Ntanda
88	MF	POR	Diogo Martins
97	FW	MOZ	Stefan
98	MF	FRA	Ibrahima
99	GK	AUT	Jakob Odehnal
—	MF	GBS	Famana Quizera

== Managers ==
- (Portugal) Vieira Nunes (1989–90)
- (Portugal) Luís Campos (1992–93)
- (Portugal) Manuel Cajuda (1993–94)
- (Portugal) Vitor Manuel (1994–96)
- (Portugal) Eurico Gomes (1996)
- (Portugal) Quinito (1996–97)
- (Portugal) Vitor Manuel (1997)
- (Portugal) Vítor Oliveira (1997–98)
- (Portugal) Mário Reis (1998–99)
- (Portugal) Manuel José (1999–01)
- (Portugal) José Mourinho (2001–02)
- (Portugal) Mário Reis (2002)
- (Portugal) Vítor Pontes (2002)
- (Portugal) Manuel Cajuda (2002–03)
- (Portugal) Vítor Pontes (2003–05)
- (Portugal) José Manuel Gomes (2005)
- (Portugal) Jorge Jesus (2005–06)
- (Portugal) Domingos (2006–07)
- (Portugal) Paulo Duarte (2007)
- (Portugal) Vítor Oliveira (2007–08)
- (Portugal) Paulo Alves (2008)
- (Portugal) Manuel Fernandes (2008–09)
- (Angola) Lito Vidigal (2009–10)
- (Portugal) Pedro Caixinha (2010–11)
- (Portugal) Vítor Pontes (2011)
- (Portugal) Manuel Cajuda (2011–12)
- (Portugal) José Dominguez (2012)
- (Portugal) Ricardo Moura (2012–2013)
- (Portugal) Luis Bilro (2012–2013)
- (Portugal) Rui Rodrigues (2013–2014)
- (Portugal) Jorge Casquilha (2014–2016)
- (Belarus) Siarhei Kabelski (2016)
- (Portugal) Kata (2016–2017)
- (Moldova) Serghei Cleșcenco (2017)
- (Portugal) Rui Amorim (2017–2018)
- (Portugal) Luís Pinto (2018)
- (Portugal) Tiago Vicente (2018)
- (Portugal) Filipe Cândido (2018–2020)
- (Portugal) Carlos Delgado (2020)
- (Portugal) Hélder Pereira (2020–2021)
- (Portugal) Filipe Cândido (2021)
- (Portugal) Bino (2021–2022)
- (Portugal) Vasco Botelho da Costa (2022–2024)
- (Portugal) Filipe Cândido (2024–present)

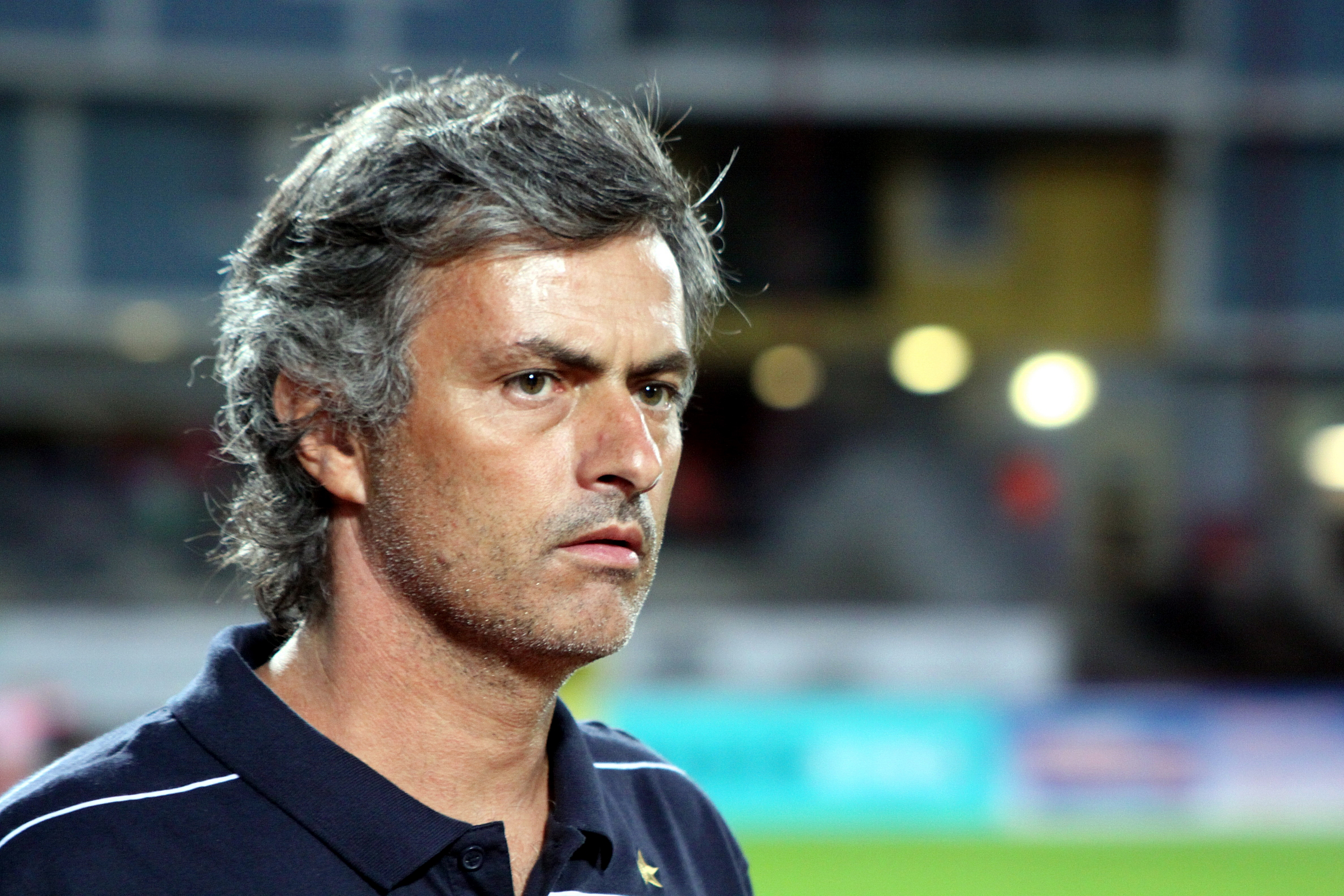
José Mourinho was club manager in 2001–02, his exploits there leading to a Porto move.

== Honours ==
- Segunda Divisão/Liga Portugal 2: 1980–81, 1997–98
- Liga 3: 2022–23
- UEFA Intertoto Cup co-winners: 2007

=== Other notable results ===
- UEFA Intertoto Cup finalist: 2004
- Taça de Portugal runners-up: 2002–03
- Supertaça Cândido de Oliveira runners-up: 2003

== League and cup history ==
Season	I	II	III	IV	V	Pts	MP	W	D	L	GF	GA	±	Taça de Portugal
2025–26		6				50 pts	34	13	11	10	52	46	+6	1/4final
2024–25		6				52 pts	34	15	7	12	49	37	+12	1/32 final
2023–24		12				42 pts	34	11	9	14	44	40	+4	1/4 final
2022–23			1			62 pts	28	20	2	6	57	26	+31	1/64 final
2021–22			4			58 pts	28	17	7	4	47	23	+24	1/32 final
2020–21			4			54 pts	27	16	6	5	41	19	+22	1/16 final
2019–20			12			29 pts	25	6	11	8	27	24	+3	1/64 final
2018–19			3			75 pts	34	24	3	7	59	24	+35	1/64 final
2017–18			3			73 pts	30	23	4	3	68	21	+47	1/16 final
2016–17			3			71 pts	32	22	5	5	56	19	+37	1/32 final
2015–16			5			64 pts	32	18	10	4	52	21	+31	1/64 final
2014–15			3			55 pts	30	16	7	7	57	35	+22	1/64 final
2013–14			3			59 pts	32	17	8	7	43	33	+10	1/32 final
2012–13			7			46 pts	30	13	7	10	36	31	+5	1/16 final
2011–12	16					19 pts	30	5	4	21	25	56	-31	1/32 final
2010–11	10					35 pts	30	9	8	13	25	38	-13	1/32 final
2009–10	10					35 pts	30	9	8	13	35	41	-6	1/16 final
2008–09		2				54 pts	30	15	9	6	46	29	+17	1/32 final
2007–08	16					16 pts	30	3	7	20	25	53	-28	1/16 final
2006–07	7					41 pts	30	10	11	9	24	26	-2	1/16 final
2005–06	7					47 pts	34	13	8	13	44	42	+2	1/32 final
2004–05	15					38 pts	34	8	14	12	29	36	-7	1/16 final
2003–04	10					45 pts	34	11	12	11	43	45	-2	1/8 final
2002–03	5					49 pts	34	13	10	11	49	47	+2	Final
2001–02	7					55 pts	34	15	10	9	52	35	+17	1/32 final
2000–01	5					56 pts	34	15	11	8	46	41	+5	1/16 final
1999–2000	10					42 pts	34	10	12	12	31	35	-4	1/16 final
1998–99	6					52 pts	34	14	10	10	36	29	+7	1/8 final
1997–98		1				70 pts	34	20	10	4	73	32	+41	1/2 final
1996–97	17					30 pts	34	8	6	20	25	53	-28	1/32 final
1995–96	7					47 pts	34	13	5	15	38	50	-12	1/2 final
1994–95	6					36 pts	34	13	10	11	41	44	-3	1/16 final
1993–94		2				45 pts	34	19	7	8	46	19	+27	1/32 final
1992–93		8				34 pts	34	13	8	13	36	37	-1	1/16 final
1991–92		8				35 pts	34	13	9	12	34	32	+2	1/32 final
1990–91		9				41 pts	38	14	13	11	45	35	+10	1/32 final
1989–90		3				49 pts	34	20	9	5	61	18	+43	1/32 final
1988–89		10				31 pts	34	9	13	12	42	44	-2	1/64 final
1987–88		4				47 pts	38	18	11	9	64	43	+21	1/8 final
1986–87		12				27 pts	30	10	7	13	28	39	-11	1/64 final
1985–86		9				28 pts	30	10	8	12	33	49	-16	1/64 final
1984–85		2				41 pts	30	17	7	6	42	27	+25	1/64 final
1983–84		9				28 pts	30	10	8	12	35	25	+10	1/64 final
1982–83		3				44 pts	30	17	10	3	44	17	+27	1/64 final
1981–82	16					20 pts	30	8	4	18	25	50	-25	1/16 final
1980–81		1				45 pts	30	19	7	4	56	21	+35	1/8 final
1979–80	13					21 pts	30	6	9	15	26	49	-23	1/32 final
1978–79		1				46 pts	30	20	6	4	56	20	+36	1/64 final
1977–78		8				30 pts	30	11	8	11	34	42	-8	1/16 final
1976–77		11				28 pts	30	10	8	12	26	31	-5	1/64 final
1975–76		16				34 pts	38	11	12	15	42	52	-10	1/16 final
1974–75		13				34 pts	38	12	10	16	50	56	-6	1/128 final
1973–74		7				41 pts	38	16	9	13	52	49	+3	1/64 final
1972–73		5				39 pts	30	17	5	8	50	27	+23	1/32 final
1971–72		3				35 pts	30	14	7	9	50	29	+21	1/16 final
1970–71		3				30 pts	26	11	8	7	40	34	+6	1/64 final
1969–70			1			48 pts	30	20	8	2	70	16	+54	1/128 final
1968–69			2			31 pts	22	15	1	6	54	20	+34	1/32 final
1967–68			2			12 pts	10	5	2	3	15	9	+6	-
1966–67			1			16 pts	10	7	2	1	21	9	+12	-
I - 1.ª Liga; II - 2.ª Liga; III - Campeonato Nacional de Séniores/Liga 3; IV - AF Leiria - Divisão de Honra/Campeonato Nacional de Séniores; V - AF Leiria 1ª Divisão/AF Leiria - Divisão de Honra;

== European record ==
União de Leiria always presented as home score (left) in results shown

Season	Competition	Round	Opponent	Home	Away	Agg.
1995-96	1995 UEFA Intertoto Cup	GS (Gr.4)	(Hungary) Békéscsaba 1912 Előre	—N/a	2-2	2nd
1995-96	1995 UEFA Intertoto Cup	GS (Gr.4)	(Denmark) Næstved	1-1	—N/a	2nd
1995-96	1995 UEFA Intertoto Cup	GS (Gr.4)	(Wales) Ton Pentre	—N/a	3−0	2nd
1995-96	1995 UEFA Intertoto Cup	GS (Gr.4)	(Netherlands) Heerenveen	1−0	—N/a	2nd
2002-03	2002 UEFA Intertoto Cup	R1	(Estonia) FCI Levadia Tallinn	0-3 (Note: Match awarded to Levadia Tallinn due to irregular use of player, Roudolphe Douala. União de Leiria won the match 1-0 on the pitch.)	2-1	2-4
2003-04	2003-04 UEFA Cup	QR	(Northern Ireland) Coleraine	5-0	1-2	6-2
2003-04	2003-04 UEFA Cup	R1	(Norway) Molde	1-0	1-3	2-3
2004-05	2004 UEFA Intertoto Cup	R3	(Russia) Shinnik Yaroslavl	2-1	4-1	6-2
2004-05	2004 UEFA Intertoto Cup	SF	(Belgium) Genk	2-0	0-0	2-0
2004-05	2004 UEFA Intertoto Cup	Finals	(France) Lille	0-2 (a.e.t.)	0-0	0-2
2005-06	2005 UEFA Intertoto Cup	R1	(Germany) Hamburg	0-1	0-3	0-4
2007-08	2007 UEFA Intertoto Cup	R3	(Serbia) Hajduk Kula	4-1 (a.e.t.)	0-1	4-2
2007-08	2007–08 UEFA Cup	QR2	(Israel) Maccabi Netanya	0-0	1-0	1-0
2007-08	2007–08 UEFA Cup	R1	(Germany) Bayer Leverkusen	3-2	1-3	4-5
