= Manuel Cajuda =

Portuguese footballer and manager

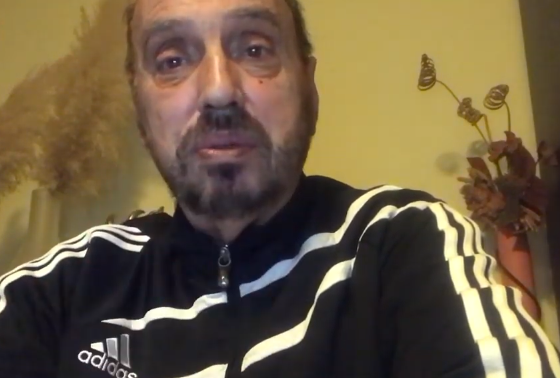
- Cajuda in 2020

Personal information
- Full name: Manuel Ventura Cajuda de Sousa
- Date of birth: 27 June 1951 (age 75)
- Place of birth: Olhão, Portugal
- Position: Midfielder

Youth career
- 1967–1969: Olhanense

Senior career*
Years	Team	Apps	(Gls)
1970–1971	Sambrasense		
1971–1972	Olhanense		
1972–1973	Sambrasense		
1975–1976	Olhanense	29	(1)
1976–1983	Farense		

Managerial career
- 1984: Farense
- 1987–1988: Portimonense
- 1988–1989: Olhanense
- 1989–1990: Louletano
- 1990–1991: Torreense
- 1991: O Elvas
- 1991–1993: Torreense
- 1993–1994: União Leiria
- 1994–1997: Braga
- 1997–1998: Belenenses
- 1998–2002: Braga
- 2002–2003: União Leiria
- 2003–2004: Marítimo
- 2004: Beira-Mar
- 2005–2006: Naval
- 2006: Zamalek
- 2006–2009: Vitória Guimarães
- 2009–2011: Sharjah
- 2011–2012: União Leiria
- 2013: Olhanense
- 2013: Chongqing
- 2014: Tianjin Songjiang
- 2015: Ajman Club
- 2015: BEC Tero Sasana
- 2017: Sichuan Longfor
- 2018–2019: Académico Viseu
- 2020: Leixões
- * Club domestic league appearances and goals

Manuel Ventura Cajuda de Sousa (born 27 June 1951) is a Portuguese football manager and retired footballer.

In a career which spanned three decades, he managed nearly 20 teams in his own country, and also worked in Egypt, the United Arab Emirates, China and Thailand.

== Playing career ==
Born in Olhão, Cajuda played exclusively in his native Algarve region during his career, starting out at S.C. Olhanense. In 1975 he joined what would be his main club, S.C. Farense also in the second division.

In the summer of 1983, even though the Faro side had just promoted to the Primeira Liga, 32-year-old Cajuda decided to retire from playing.

== Coaching career ==
Immediately after retiring, Cajuda started working as a manager with Farense, leading the team through 12 games in their first-ever season in the top flight and managing to help them retain their league status after finishing 12th. He continued to work in his native region in the following years, with Portimonense SC, Olhanense and Louletano DC.

In 1994, after years of working almost exclusively in the second level – the exception being S.C.U. Torreense in the 1991–92 campaign – Cajuda signed for S.C. Braga, remaining in Minho for the following eight years (ranking in fourth place in 1997 and 2001), with two incomplete seasons with C.F. Os Belenenses in between. He managed to finish in the top six with his following two clubs, U.D. Leiria – he had already been in charge of them nine years before, in division two – and C.S. Marítimo.

Cajuda left the Madeira side only one game into the 2004–05 season, and joined S.C. Beira-Mar also of the top tier, but only lasted an additional ten matches in Aveiro. After a brief spell with Associação Naval 1º de Maio he left for Egypt with Zamalek SC, becoming its second Portuguese coach after Nelo Vingada.

Cajuda returned to Portugal midway through 2006–07 campaign joining Vitória de Guimarães – being announced on Christmas Day – which he led to promotion and a third position in the following year, just narrowly surpassing S.L. Benfica for the last UEFA Champions League berth and only to lose controversially in the last qualifying round against FC Basel of Switzerland. He left at the conclusion of 2008–09 with an eighth-place finish, joining Sharjah FC of the United Arab Emirates.

In late September 2011, Cajuda became Leiria's third coach of the season after the dismissed Pedro Caixinha and Vítor Pontes. He was relieved of his duties on 14 March 2012, with the team ranking last in the league.

After nearly a quarter of a century away, Cajuda returned to hometown club Olhanense on 8 January 2013, succeeding Sérgio Conceição. He resigned on 1 May with the side having slipped from eighth to 14th, one place off the bottom.

Following brief spells across Asia, namely in China, Thailand and the UAE, Cajuda returned to his country to take over at Académico de Viseu F.C. in February 2018, replacing Francisco Chaló at a team challenging for a place in the top flight. Having finished that campaign in third, one place off promotion, he resigned the following 13 January them in 13th place.

On 26 January 2020, Cajuda was hired at Leixões S.C. who were placed tenth in the second tier. In six games he managed two victories, with the club finishing the championship in 9th place, before the club announced his departure on 9 May 2020.

== Personal life ==
Cajuda's sons, Hugo (born 1979) and João (1984), were both involved in sports: the former played twice for Braga in the top division – under the management of his father – mainly representing their reserves during a short spell. The latter was engaged in gymnastics in his youth, but later took up an acting career.
