= Gong Zheng (footballer) =

Chinese footballer

Gong Zheng 龚正
Personal information
- Full name: Gong Zheng
- Date of birth: April 20, 1993 (age 33)
- Place of birth: Changchun, Jilin, China
- Height: 1.81 m (5 ft 11 in)
- Position: Striker

Team information
- Current team: Xi'an Chongde Ronghai
- Number: 39

Youth career
- Beijing Guoan

Senior career*
Years	Team	Apps	(Gls)
2012	Beijing Youth	21	(6)
2013–2015	Beijing Guoan	1	(0)
2016–2020	Beijing BSU	6	(0)
2017–2018	→ Beijing BIT (loan)	42	(22)
2019	→ Suzhou Dongwu (loan)	27	(12)
2021	Hebei Zhuoao	11	(3)
2022-2023	Jinan Xingzhou	14	(8)
2023	Qingdao Red Lions	15	(1)
2024-	Xi'an Chongde Ronghai	23	(5)
- * Club domestic league appearances and goals as of 13 October 2024

Gong Zheng (Chinese: 龚正; pinyin: Gōng Zhèng; born 20 April 1993) is a Chinese football player who currently plays for Xi'an Chongde Ronghai in the China League Two.

== Club career ==
In 2013 Gong Zheng started his professional footballer career with Beijing Guoan in the Chinese Super League. He would eventually make his league debut for Beijing on August 25, 2013 in a game against Dalian Aerbin that saw Beijing win 4-0, coming on as a substitute for Zhang Xizhe in the 85th minute.

In February 2016, Gong transferred to China League One side Beijing BG. In 2017, Gong was loaned to League Two side Beijing BIT until 31 December 2018. On 2 March 2019, Gong was loaned to Suzhou Dongwu for the 2019 season.

== Career statistics ==
Statistics accurate as of match played 13 October 2024.

Appearances and goals by club, season and competition
Club	Season	League			National Cup		Continental		Other		Total	
Club	Season	Division	Apps	Goals	Apps	Goals	Apps	Goals	Apps	Goals	Apps	Goals
Beijing Youth	2012	China League Two	21	6	0	0	-		-		21	6
Beijing Guoan	2013	Chinese Super League	1	0	0	0	0	0	-		1	0
Beijing BSU	2020	China League One	6	0	-		-		-		6	0
Beijing BIT (loan)	2017	China League Two	20	9	1	0	-		-		21	9
Beijing BIT (loan)	2018	China League Two	22	13	0	0	-		-		22	13
Beijing BIT (loan)	Total		42	22	1	0	0	0	0	0	43	22
Suzhou Dongwu (loan)	2019	China League Two	27	12	1	0	-		-		28	12
Hebei Zhuoao	2021	China League Two	11	3	0	0	-		-		11	3
Jinan Xingzhou	2022	China League Two	14	8	0	0	-		-		14	8
Jinan Xingzhou	2023	China League One	0	0	0	0	-		-		0	0
Jinan Xingzhou	Total		14	8	0	0	0	0	0	0	14	8
Qingdao Red Lions	2023	China League Two	15	1	2	0	-		-		17	1
Xi'an Chongde Ronghai	2024	China League Two	23	5	2	1	-		-		25	6
Career total			160	57	5	1	0	0	0	0	165	58

== Honours ==
=== Club ===
Jinan Xingzhou

- China League Two: 2022
