= Juan Manuel Lillo =

Spanish association football manager

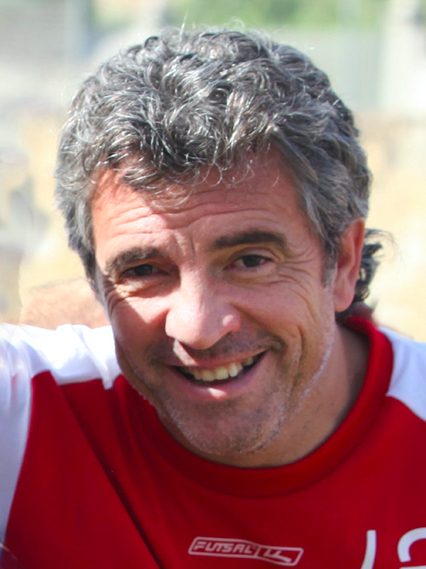
- Lillo in 2013

Personal information
- Full name: Juan Manuel Lillo Díez
- Date of birth: 3 November 1965 (age 61)
- Place of birth: Tolosa, Spain

Team information
- Current team: Mexico (assistant)

Managerial career
- Years: Team
- 1981–1985: Amaroz KE
- 1985–1988: Tolosa
- 1988–1989: Mirandés
- 1990–1991: Mirandés
- 1991–1992: Cultural Leonesa
- 1992–1996: Salamanca
- 1996–1997: Oviedo
- 1998: Tenerife
- 2000: Zaragoza
- 2003–2004: Ciudad Murcia
- 2004–2005: Terrassa
- 2005–2006: Dorados Sinaloa
- 2008–2009: Real Sociedad
- 2009–2010: Almería
- 2014: Millonarios
- 2015–2016: Chile (assistant)
- 2016–2017: Sevilla (assistant)
- 2017: Atlético Nacional
- 2018–2019: Vissel Kobe
- 2019–2020: Qingdao Huanghai
- 2020–2022: Manchester City (assistant)
- 2022–2023: Al Sadd
- 2023–2025: Manchester City (assistant)
- 2026–: Mexico (assistant)

Juan Manuel "Juanma" Lillo Díez (born 3 November 1965) is a Spanish football manager.

Having started coaching before his 20s, he was the youngest manager in charge of a La Liga club, having taken over Salamanca at not yet 30 years of age. He also coached Oviedo, Tenerife, Zaragoza and Almería in the top-flight, and had spells in charge of clubs in Mexico, Colombia, Japan, China and Qatar.

== Coaching career ==
=== Early years and Salamanca ===
Born in Tolosa, Gipuzkoa, Lillo began coaching local Amaroz KE at just 16 and, four years later, he took charge of Tolosa in the Tercera División. He moved to Mirandés also in that level afterwards, and led the side to promotion to Segunda División B in the 1988–89 season, as champions.

Lillo spent the 1991–92 campaign at Cultural Leonesa, advocating a 4–2–3–1 formation. He became the youngest coach to attain the national coaching badge in Spain.

Lillo made his name as a manager at Salamanca, joining the club in mid-1992 at the behest of its chairman Juan José Hidalgo. In his first season he finished second in the third division, narrowly missing out on promotion playoffs which he attained the following campaign without any major squad changes. This prompted reported interest from Real Valladolid, but the coach stayed until the end of 1995–96 as they competed in La Liga– this made him the youngest ever person to manage at the highest level, at only 29; after 28 games in charge, with Salamanca four points into the relegation zone, he was dismissed, but players and fans publicly opposed the sacking, supporting him in recognition of his achievements – the team finished in last position, eleven points behind 21st-placed Mérida.

Lillo then had some spells in the top division: in the 1996–97 season he worked with Real Oviedo, but was fired before its closure due to poor results. He returned to management in February 1998 with Tenerife, helping them to avoid relegation in his first year; the following campaign, however, he did not see out the year, being sacked after 15 matches as the team were ultimately relegated.

After a year-and-a-half break, Lillo returned to take the reins of Real Zaragoza – the team had qualified for the UEFA Cup the previous season, and manager Txetxu Rojo moved to Athletic Bilbao. He set about fulfilling the task of progressing in the European competition and repeating European qualification through the league but did not achieve this, being relieved of his duties after barely three months.

=== 2000s ===
Lillo did not return to coaching quickly: he worked as a sports commentator for television channel Antena 3, during its 2002 FIFA World Cup coverage. From 2003 to 2005 he coached in Segunda División, with Ciudad de Murcia and Terrassa, with little success (the Catalans were even relegated).

Lillo went to Mexico in 2005, joining Dorados de Sinaloa and resigning mid-season (the club would also eventually drop down a division). He insinuated that the team he was battling against to avoid relegation, Televisa-owned San Luis, had gained unusual victories against more powerful opposition, which were also owned by the Televisa group; this caused much controversy in both the Mexican press and football league.

Following the incident, Lillo spent the following two years away from football until he was appointed as the new head coach of Real Sociedad in April 2008, with the Basques in the second tier. Despite losing only once during his tenure, they failed to reach a promotion spot after finishing in sixth position, and he was replaced by Martín Lasarte.

In late December 2009, Lillo replaced Hugo Sánchez at the helm of struggling Almería, just one place above the relegation zone. After helping the Andalusian team finish 13th, his contract was renewed for a further season.

After a 8–0 home loss against Barcelona on 20 November 2010, Lillo was dismissed with the side in the relegation zone, eventually being relegated after four years.

=== Abroad ===
After several years of inactivity, Lillo was appointed at Colombian club Millonarios in December 2013. He was fired on 2 September 2014, due to four consecutive Primera A losses and elimination in the Copa Sudamericana.

On 8 October 2015, Lillo joined Jorge Sampaoli's staff at the Chile national team, being handed the role of handling the transition of players from the youth sides to the main squad. On 21 June 2017, after leaving Sevilla where he was working under the same manager, he was announced as the new coach Atlético Nacional in place of Reinaldo Rueda; he resigned from his position at the latter in December, following elimination by Deportes Tolima in the quarter-finals of the Categoría Primera A.

Lillo switched continents again in September 2018, joining Japanese J1 League club Vissel Kobe who had recently signed high-profile compatriot Andrés Iniesta. He resigned in April 2019 with the team in mid-table, despite financial backing from Rakuten and the presence of other veterans such Lukas Podolski and David Villa.

Remaining in the Far East, Lillo took the helm at Qingdao Huanghai of China League One in August 2019, and won six of his first seven games as they rose from fifth place to guarantee promotion to the Super League; the side, who had Yaya Touré in midfield, finished the season as champions.

On 9 June 2020, Lillo was announced as new Manchester City assistant manager, replacing Mikel Arteta. He returned to head coach duties two years later, succeeding compatriot Javi Gracia at Qatar Stars League champions Al Sadd. In August 2023, he went back to Manchester City, and later that month he stood in for Pep Guardiola in victories over Sheffield United and Fulham, as the head coach recovered from back surgery in Spain.

Lillo departed City on 28 May 2025, after expressing a desire to return to Spain. On 28 August 2026, he joined Rafael Márquez's staff at the Mexico national team ahead of the 2030 FIFA World Cup.

== Honours ==
Mirandés

- Tercera División: 1988–89

Salamanca

- Segunda División B: 1993–94

Qingdao Huanghai

- China League One: 2019
