= Vítor Pontes =

Portuguese football manager and former player

Personal information
- Full name: Vítor Manuel Pereira Pontes
- Date of birth: 16 August 1958 (age 68)
- Place of birth: Leiria, Portugal
- Height: 1.78 m (5 ft 10 in)
- Position: Goalkeeper

Youth career
- 1972–1976: União Leiria

Senior career*
Years	Team	Apps	(Gls)
1976–1985	União Leiria		
1977–1978	→ Vieirense (loan)		
1985–1987	Vitória Guimarães	0	(0)
1987–1988	O Elvas	5	(0)
1988–1989	Louletano		
1989–1992	Nacional	3	(0)
1992–1993	Tirsense	0	(0)
1993–1994	Guarda	14	(0)

Managerial career
- 2002: União Leiria
- 2003–2005: União Leiria
- 2005–2006: Vitória Guimarães
- 2007–2009: Portimonense
- 2011: União Leiria
- 2012–2013: Chibuto
- 2014: Ferroviário Maputo
- 2016: Sichuan Longfor
- * Club domestic league appearances and goals

Vítor Manuel Pereira Pontes (born 16 August 1958) is a Portuguese retired footballer who played as a goalkeeper, and is a manager.

== Playing career ==
Born in Leiria, Pontes started his professional career with local União Desportiva. However, during his 18 years as a senior, he played almost exclusively as a backup, only appearing in seven Primeira Liga matches during his career – five for O Elvas C.A.D. in the 1987–88 season, and two for C.D. Nacional in two years combined.

== Coaching career ==
After retiring in 1994 at age 36 with lowly A.D. Guarda (third division), Pontes began immediately working as a goalkeeper coach with his first club, also going to serve there as an assistant manager. He then coached Leiria's first team for two full seasons after a brief interim spell in 2002, subsequently signing with Vitória S.C. for the 2005–06 campaign and being one of two managers in a season which ended in top level relegation – the other was Jaime Pacheco.

In 2007, Pontes signed with division two side Portimonense SC, and remained there two seasons. On 8 September 2011, after two years out of the managerial scene, he returned to active and União de Leiria, replacing fired Pedro Caixinha. His first game in charge was a 1–0 away win against S.C. Beira-Mar, but he left his post after only one more match, however.

In September 2012, Pontes took over at FC Chibuto in Mozambique. He moved to the China League Two in May 2016, signing with Sichuan Longfor FC.

== Other ventures ==
After leaving Portimonense, Pontes worked as a football pundit for Sport TV, in the channel's domestic and UEFA Champions League coverage.
