= Shenzhen Pengcheng F.C. =

Chinese football club

Shenzhen Pengcheng Shēnzhèn Péngchéng 深圳鹏城
- Full name: Shenzhen Pengcheng Football Club 深圳鹏城足球俱乐部
- Founded: 23 November 2016; 8 years ago
- Dissolved: 2020

Shenzhen Pengcheng Football Club (Chinese: 深圳鹏城足球俱乐部) was an amateur football club based in Shenzhen, Guangdong that most recently participated in the China League Two.

On 5 February 2020 Shenzhen Pengcheng officially announced their withdrawal from 2020 China League Two.

== Managerial history ==
- (China) Zhang Jian (2017)
- (China) Chen Dazhi (2018–2020)

== Results ==
All-time league rankings

- As of the end of 2019 season.

Year	Div	Pld	W	D	L	GF	GA	GD	Pts	Pos.	FA Cup	Super Cup	AFC	Att./G	Stadium
2017	4									8	DNQ	DNQ	DNQ		Bao'an Stadium
2018	3	28	8	9	11	27	30	−3	33	18	R1	DNQ	DNQ	457	Xixiang Sports Center
2019	3	30	8	11	11	25	29	−4	35^{1}	17	R3	DNQ	DNQ		Xixiang Sports Center

- ^1 In group stage.

Key

	China top division
	China second division
	China third division
	China fourth division
W	Winners
RU	Runners-up
3	Third place
	Relegated

- Pld = Played
- W = Games won
- D = Games drawn
- L = Games lost
- F = Goals for
- A = Goals against
- Pts = Points
- Pos = Final position
- DNQ = Did not qualify
- DNE = Did not enter
- NH = Not Held
- – = Does Not Exist
- R1 = Round 1
- R2 = Round 2
- R3 = Round 3
- R4 = Round 4
- F = Final
- SF = Semi-finals
- QF = Quarter-finals
- R16 = Round of 16
- Group = Group stage
- GS2 = Second Group stage
- QR1 = First Qualifying Round
- QR2 = Second Qualifying Round
- QR3 = Third Qualifying Round
