= Asier Eizaguirre =

Spanish footballer and manager

Personal information
- Full name: Asier Eizaguirre Rosa
- Date of birth: 10 July 1981 (age 45)
- Place of birth: Irun, Spain
- Height: 1.88 m (6 ft 2 in)
- Position: Forward

Team information
- Current team: Real Sociedad C (manager)

Youth career
- Real Sociedad

Senior career*
Years	Team	Apps	(Gls)
2000–2004	Real Sociedad B	77	(17)
2004–2005	Novelda	46	(8)
2005–2006	Huesca	29	(7)
2006–2007	Hospitalet	35	(5)
2007–2008	Cultural Leonesa	31	(4)
2008–2010	Barakaldo	53	(9)
2010–2011	Lleida	33	(5)
2011–2013	Lleida Esportiu	66	(17)
2013–2014	Reus	13	(1)
2014–2016	Ascó	54	(18)
2016–2017	Balaguer	31	(15)

Managerial career
- 2017: Balaguer (youth)
- 2018: Beijing BIT (assistant)
- 2019–2020: Lleida Esportiu B
- 2020–2021: Lleida Esportiu (youth)
- 2021–2022: Lleida Esportiu (assistant)
- 2022–2025: Real Sociedad (youth)
- 2025–: Real Sociedad C
- * Club domestic league appearances and goals

Asier Eizaguirre Rosa (born 10 July 1981) is a Spanish former footballer who played as a forward, and the current manager of Real Sociedad C.

== Playing career ==
Born in Irun, Gipuzkoa, Basque Country, Eizaguirre was a youth product of hometown side Real Sociedad. After making his senior debut with the reserves in Tercera División in 2000, he was an unused substitute with the first team in a 3–3 away draw against CD Numancia on 15 April 2001.

In January 2004, Eizaguirre moved to Segunda División B side Novelda CF, where he soon established himself as a regular starter. He continued to feature in that category in the following years, representing SD Huesca, CE L'Hospitalet, Cultural y Deportiva Leonesa, Barakaldo CF, UE Lleida, Lleida Esportiu and CF Reus Deportiu.

In 2014, Eizaguirre signed for FC Ascó in the fourth tier, and scored a career-best 18 goals in his first season as the club narrowly missed out promotion. On 18 July 2016, he joined CF Balaguer of the Primera Catalana, and retired with the club in the following year, aged 36.

== Managerial career ==
Immediately after retiring, Eizaguirre became the manager of the Juvenil squad of his last club Balaguer. In February 2017, he received an offer to become the assistant of compatriot Robert Ahufinger at Beijing Institute of Technology FC in China.

On 17 October 2019, Eizaguirre returned to Lleida Esportiu, after being named manager of the reserve team in Segona Catalana. On 15 July 2021, after spending the previous campaign at the helm of the Juvenil División de Honor side, he became the assistant of Gabri in the first team.

Eizaguirre had his contract rescinded at Lleida on 3 December 2021, after the club alleged a "loss of trust". In July 2022, he returned to his first club Real Sociedad as an assistant of Lander García in the División de Honor Juvenil squad.

In 2023, Eizaguirre became the manager of the Easo (Juvenil B) squad of the Txuri-urdin, before being appointed manager of the C-team in Tercera Federación in July 2025.

== Managerial statistics ==
As of 26 April 2026

Managerial record by team and tenure
Team	Nat	From	To	Record								Ref
Team	Nat	From	To	G	W	D	L	GF	GA	GD	Win %	Ref
Lleida Esportiu B	(Spain)	17 October 2019	30 June 2020	17	7	4	6	29	27	+2	41.18	
Real Sociedad C	(Spain)	16 June 2025	Present	32	15	4	13	42	38	+4	46.88	
Total				49	22	8	19	71	65	+6	44.90	—
