= Dujiangyan Phoenix Stadium =

Sports venue in Dujiangyan, China

Dujiangyan Phoenix Stadium 都江堰凤凰体育场
- Full name: Dujiangyan Phoenix Stadium
- Former names: Dujiangyan Sports Centre Stadium
- Location: Dujiangyan City, Sichuan, China
- Capacity: 12,700

Construction
- Groundbreaking: February 2008
- Built: 2008–2010
- Opened: 15 May 2010

Tenants
- Sichuan Longfor F.C. (2017–2019); Chengdu Qbao F.C. (2016–)

The Dujiangyan Phoenix Stadium (Chinese: 都江堰凤凰体育场) is a multi-purpose stadium in Dujiangyan City, Sichuan, China. It is currently used mostly for association football matches. The stadium holds 12,700 people. The venue broke ground in February 2008 with original name Dujiangyan Sports Centre Stadium. It opened in May 2010 with a new name "Phoenix", which was in memory of the city rebirth from the 2008 Sichuan earthquake.
