= Rugao Olympic Sports Center =

Sports venue in Rugao, China

- 如皋奥林匹克体育中心
- Interactive map of Rugao Olympic Sports Center
- Location: Rugao, Jiangsu, China
- Coordinates: 32°22′36″N 120°35′05″E
- Capacity: 25,000

Construction
- Groundbreaking: 2011
- Opened: 2014
- Renovated: 2023

Tenant
- Nantong Zhiyun (2016–present)

The Rugao Olympic Sports Center is a sports complex in Rugao, Jiangsu, China. It is the home of China League One club Nantong Zhiyun. It was approved as a major project by both the Jiangsu Provincial Development and Reform Commission and the Jiangsu Provincial Sports Bureau. It was constructed as part of the city's "Eleventh Five-Year Plan".

== History ==
Construction of the Rugao Olympic Sports Center began in November 2011 and was completed in March 2014. The project was designed by the Jiangsu Provincial Architectural Design Institute.
