= Wang Bo (football manager) =

Chinese football manager (born 1970)

Wang Bo 王波
Personal information
- Date of birth: 3 April 1970 (age 56)
- Place of birth: Shenyang, Liaoning, China

Managerial career
- Years: Team
- 2014–2017: Inner Mongolia Zhongyou
- 2018: Shenyang Urban
- 2018: Inner Mongolia Zhongyou
- 2019: Shaanxi Chang'an Athletic
- 2019–2021: Beijing Renhe
- 2021: Xi'an Wolves
- 2025: Jiangxi Lushan

Wang Bo (Chinese: 王波; pinyin: Wáng Bō; born 3 April 1970) is a Chinese former football player and football manager. He was most recently the manager of former China League Two side Jiangxi Lushan.

On 21 May 2026, Wang was given a 5-year ban for match-fixing by the Chinese Football Association.

== Managerial statistics ==
As of 31 December 2021.

Managerial record by team and tenure
Team	From	To	Record				
Team	From	To	P	W	D	L	Win %
Inner Mongolia Zhongyou	2014	2017	114	46	26	42	40.4
Shenyang Urban	2018	2018	17	11	2	4	64.7
Inner Mongolia Zhongyou	2018	2018	13	6	3	4	46.2
Shaanxi Chang'an Athletic	2019	2019	20	10	4	6	50.0
Beijing Renhe	2019	2021	20	6	4	10	30.0
Xi'an Wolves	2021	2021	16	6	5	5	37.5
Total			200	85	44	71	42.5
