= Sichuan Longfor F.C. =

Chinese football club

Sichuan Annapurna Sìchuān Lóngfā 四川隆发
- Full name: Sichuan Annapurna Football Club 四川隆发足球俱乐部
- Founded: 10 September 2013; 12 years ago
- Dissolved: 2020
- Ground: Dujiangyan Phoenix Stadium, Dujiangyan, Sichuan
- Capacity: 12,700
- Owner(s): Sichuan Jinmu Mining Co., Ltd (64.9%); Huang Xuejun (27%); Sichuan Xindongxin Automobile Service Co., Ltd (5.1%); Other holders (3%)
- Chairman: He Yaping
- Manager: Li Bing
- League: China League One
- 2019: League One, 14th
Home colours	Away colours

Sichuan Annapurna Football Club was a professional football club that participated in the China League One under licence from the Chinese Football Association (CFA). The team was based in Dujiangyan City, Chengdu, Sichuan and their home stadium was the Dujiangyan Phoenix Stadium that has a seating capacity of 12,700. Their majority shareholders were Sichuan Jinmu Mining Co., Ltd 64.9%, Huang Xuejun 27% and Sichuan Xindongxin Automobile Service Co., Ltd with 5.1% of the shares of the club.

== History ==
Sichuan Longfor F.C. was established on September 10, 2013, by Huang Xuejun after he gained investment of 17 million Yuan and the support from the local government in Santai County in Mianyang, Sichuan province to register the club with the Chinese Football Association and play in the China League Two division. Jia Jin was brought in as the club's first Head coach while trails took place to select the squad before the start of the 2014 league season. The first competitive game the club played was a league match away from home on April 26, 2014, against Pu'er Wanhao that they won 2–0 with Yu Di being the club's first goalscorer. In the club's debut season the club ultimately finished in sixth within the group stages and despite briefly appearing like they could make a push for a place within the promotion play-offs their hopes were dashed when Lijiang Jiayunhao beat them on August 30, 2014, in the 14th round 2–1 with a controversial penalty.

In the following league season Huang Xuejun admitted that the club were in financial difficulty and that the Xindahai Group would be investing into the club. After gaining financial stability results on the field saw the club improve and the club finished third within the league. With further investments coming from Sichuan Xindongxin Automobile Service Co., Ltd and then Sichuan Jinmu Mining Co., Ltd the club would become promotion play-off regulars. With the appointment of Li Bing at the start of the 2018 league season the club would finally go on to achieve their first promotion when they won 2018 China League Two division title without losing a single game.

The club was dissolved after they failed to submit the salary & bonus confirmation form before the 2020 season.

=== Ownership and naming history ===
Year	Owner	Club name	Sponsored team name
2014	Huang Xuejun, et al.	Sichuan Longfor F.C.	
2015	Huang Xuejun, et al.	Sichuan Longfor F.C.	Sichuan Xindahai 四川鑫达海
2016	Sichuan Xindongxin Automobile Service Co., Ltd (70%); Huang Xuejun, et al. (30%)	Sichuan Longfor F.C.	Sichuan Annapurna 四川安纳普尔那
2017–2019	Sichuan Jinmu Mining Co., Ltd (35%→64.9%^{1}); Sichuan Xindongxin Automobile Service Co., Ltd (35%→5.1%^{1}); Huang Xuejun, et al. (30%)	Sichuan Longfor F.C.	Sichuan Annapurna 四川安纳普尔那

- ^1 In January 2019

== Managerial history ==
- (China) Jia Jin (2014)
- (Spain) José Hernández (2014)
- (China) Zhang Weizhe (2015)
- (China) Jia Jin (2015)
- (China) Zhang Weizhe (17 Feb 2016–7 May 2016)
- (Portugal) Vítor Pontes (7 May 2016–2 Nov 2016)
- (Portugal) Manuel Cajuda (5 Dec 2016–14 Oct 2017)
- (China) Li Bing (4 Dec 2017–31 Dec 2019)

== Results ==
All-time league rankings

As of the end of 2018 season.

Year	Div	Pld	W	D	L	GF	GA	GD	Pts	Pos.	FA Cup	Super Cup	AFC	Att./G	Stadium
2014	3	16	5	3	8	14	23	−9	18	6^{1}	DNE	DNQ	DNQ		Santai County Stadium
2015	3	14	7	5	2	24	14	10	26 ^{1}	3	R2	DNQ	DNQ	3,882	Santai County Stadium
2016	3	23	9	9	5	27	22	7	36	4	R1	DNQ	DNQ	6,008	Santai County Stadium
2017	3	24	14	6	4	37	17	20	48	6	R1	DNQ	DNQ	4,592	Dujiangyan Phoenix Stadium
2018	3	31	27	4	0	95	10	85	85	W	R4	DNQ	DNQ	3,478	Dujiangyan Phoenix Stadium
2019	2	30	8	7	15	36	52	–16	31	14	R3	DNQ	DNQ	6,313	Dujiangyan Phoenix Stadium

- ^1 In group stage.

Key

	China top division
	China second division
	China third division
W	Winners
RU	Runners-up
3	Third place
	Relegated

- Pld = Played
- W = Games won
- D = Games drawn
- L = Games lost
- F = Goals for
- A = Goals against
- Pts = Points
- Pos = Final position
- DNQ = Did not qualify
- DNE = Did not enter
- NH = Not Held
- – = Does Not Exist
- R1 = Round 1
- R2 = Round 2
- R3 = Round 3
- R4 = Round 4
- F = Final
- SF = Semi-finals
- QF = Quarter-finals
- R16 = Round of 16
- Group = Group stage
- GS2 = Second Group stage
- QR1 = First Qualifying Round
- QR2 = Second Qualifying Round
- QR3 = Third Qualifying Round
