= 2012 Liaoning Whowin F.C. season =

Liaoning Whowin F.C.
- Chairman: Cheng Penghui
- Manager: Ma Lin
- Super League: 1
- FA Cup: –
Home colours	Away colours

test

The 2012 Liaoning Whowin F.C. season is Liaoning's 3rd consecutive season in the Chinese Super League. Liaoning will also be competing in the Chinese FA Cup.

== Competitions ==
=== Chinese Super League ===
==== League table ====
Pos	Team	Pld	W	D	L	GF	GA	GD	Pts
8	Tianjin TEDA	30	10	10	10	29	30	−1	40
9	Shanghai Shenhua	30	8	14	8	39	34	+5	38
10	Liaoning Whowin	30	8	12	10	40	41	−1	36 (Note: Liaoning, 10pts; Hangzhou, 9pts; Shandong, 6pts, GF=4, GA=5; Qingdao, 6pts, GF=4, GA=5)
11	Hangzhou Greentown	30	9	9	12	34	46	−12	36
12	Shandong Luneng	30	8	12	10	46	43	+3	36

Source: Chinese Super League (in Chinese)
Rules for classification: 1) points; 2) goal difference; 3) number of goals scored; 4) head-to-head goals scored; 5) goal difference; 6) goals scored; 7) disciplinary points (1 point for each yellow card, 3 points for each red card). Head-to-Head: Only used at the end of the season when two or more teams need the head-to-head rules to break a tie.

==== Matches ====
10 March 2012 1	Liaoning Whowin	3–1	Henan Construction	Tiexi Stadium
Saturday 14:30	Zhao Junzhe 58' (pen.); Grozdanovski 63'; Yu Hanchao 68'	Report	88' Netto	Attendance: 15,311; Referee: Huang Yejun

17 March 2012 2	Guizhou Renhe	1–1	Liaoning Whowin	Guiyang Olympic Sports Center
Saturday	Yu Hai 6'	Report	45' Yoo-Jin Kim	Attendance: 33,220; Referee: Zhou Gang

24 March 2012 3	Liaoning Whowin	3–3	Changchun Yatai	Tiexi Stadium
Saturday	Trifunović 33', 66'; Yang Xu 61'	Report	47' Wang Dong; 55' Pei Shuai; 75' Liu Weidong	Attendance: 15,324; Referee: (China) Huang Yejun

31 March 2012 4	Dalian Aerbin	1–1	Liaoning Whowin	Jinzhou Stadium
Saturday 16:30	Yu Dabao 86'	Report	Ding Jie (yellow card) 11'; Jin Taiyan 55'; Kim Yoo-Jin (yellow card) 64'; Zhang Lu (yellow card) 69'; Zhao Junzhe (yellow card) 72'; Zheng Tao (yellow card) 84'	Attendance: 7,954; Referee: (China) Guo Baolong

7 April 2012 5	Liaoning Whowin	2–0	Qingdao Jonoon	Tiexi Stadium
Saturday 16:30	Yang Xu 10', 27' (yellow card) 56'; Zhang Ye (yellow card) 81'; Wang Liang (yellow card) 87'	Report	Zhu Jianrong (yellow card) 54'	Attendance: 16,407; Referee: (China) Wang Zhe

16 April 2012 6	Jiangsu Sainty	1–0	Liaoning Whowin	Nanjing Olympic Sports Center
Monday 20:40	Sun Xiang 15'; Ren Hang (yellow card) 38'	Report	Ding Jie (yellow card) 40' (yellow-red card) 51'; Zheng Tao (yellow card) 88'	Attendance: 24,763; Referee: (China) Wang Jin

22 April 2012 7	Liaoning Whowin	0–0	Beijing Guoan	Tiexi Stadium
Sunday 17:00	Yang Shanping (yellow card) 47'; Grozdanoski (yellow card) 65'; Brandán (yellow card) 85'; Zhang Jingyang (yellow card) 89'	Report	Matić (yellow card) 35'; Yu Yang (yellow card) 60'; Zhang Xiaobin (yellow card) 78'	Attendance: 21,882; Referee: (China) Tao Rancheng

28 April 2012 8	Guangzhou R&F	2–1	Liaoning Whowin	Yuexiushan Stadium
Saturday 16:45	Rafael Coelho 73'; Jumar 77' (yellow card) 82'	Report	Zhang Ye (yellow card) 30'; Yang Xu (yellow card) 40'; Brandán (yellow card) 83'; Zhao Junzhe 89'	Attendance: 5,380; Referee: (China) Yao Qing

6 May 2012 9	Liaoning Whowin	1–1	Shanghai Shenhua	Tiexi Stadium
Sunday 17:00	Yang Xu 90+1'	Report	Božić (yellow card) 31'; Anelka (yellow card) 34'; Qiu Tianyi 68'	Attendance: 23,167; Referee: (China) Hai Tan

12 May 2012 10	Hangzhou Greentown	2–1	Liaoning Whowin	Yellow Dragon Sports Center
Saturday 20:35	Feng Gang 6'; Du Wei 32'; Jeong Dong-Ho (yellow card) 73'; Wang Song (yellow card) 76'	Report	Wang Shouting (yellow card) 23'; Trifunović 45'; Zheng Tao (yellow card) 46'; Ding Jie (yellow card) 55'; Zhang Jingyang (yellow card) 71'; Yang Shanping (yellow card) 90'	Attendance: 7,672; Referee: (China) Ma Ning

20 May 2012 11	Liaoning Whowin	2–1	Tianjin Teda	Tiexi Stadium
Sunday 16:30	Trifunović (yellow card) 29' (goal) 47'; Grozdanoski (yellow card) 52'; Zhao Junzhe 90+6' (pen.)	Report	Goian (yellow card) 52'; Sodje (yellow card) 62'; Ars 82' (pen.); Bai Yuefeng (yellow card) 90+3'	Attendance: 18,675; Referee: (China) Li Haihe

27 May 2012 12	Dalian Shide	2–2	Liaoning Whowin	Jinzhou Stadium
Sunday 20:00	Zhu Ting 33' (red card) 33'; Chamanga (yellow card) 52'; Kamburov 67' (pen.)	Report	Zhang Jingyang 19'; Yang Xu 21'; Yang Shanping (yellow card) 56'; Zhang Ye (yellow card) 64'	Attendance: 14,281

16 June 2012 13	Liaoning Whowin	1–0	Shandong Luneng Taishan	Tiexi Stadium
Saturday 16:30	Zhang Jingyang 2'; Ding Jie (yellow card) 6' (yellow-red card) 90+1'; Grozdanoski (yellow card) 31'	Report	Liu Yang (yellow card) 38'; Wang Qiang (red card) 75'	Attendance: 17,531; Referee: (China) Zhong Jun

23 June 2012 14	Liaoning Whowin	0–3	Guangzhou Evergrande	Tiexi Stadium
Saturday 20:30	Zheng Tao (yellow card) 28'; Wu Gaojun (yellow card) 55'; Yu Hanchao (red card) 73'; Yang Shanping (yellow card) 79'	Report	Feng Xiaoting (yellow card) 7'; Jiang Ning 42'; Gao Lin 62'; Conca 68'	Attendance: 27,823; Referee: (China) Fan Qi

29 June 2012 15	Shanghai Shenxin	0–0	Liaoning Whowin	Jinshan Sports Centre
Friday 20:45	Wang Jiayu (yellow card) 40'; Johnny (yellow card) 59'	Report	Trifunović (yellow card) 59'; Wang Bo (yellow card) 88'	Attendance: 12,522; Referee: (China) Mo Weicong

7 July 2012 16	Henan Jianye	1–1	Liaoning Whowin	Zhengzhou Hanghai Stadium
Saturday 20:45	Zhao Peng (yellow card) 25'; Katongo 70'; Qiao Wei (yellow card) 80'; Tan Wangsong (yellow card) 90'	Report	Yang Shanping (yellow card) 45'; Yang Xu (yellow card) 74'; Kim Yoo-Jin 85'	Attendance: 16,369; Referee: (China) Wang Di

14 July 2012 17	Liaoning Whowin	1–1	Guizhou Renhe	Tiexi Stadium
Saturday 20:30	Yang Shanping 89'	Report	Liu Tianqi (yellow card) 2'; Muslimović 43'; Yu Hai (yellow card) 64'; Rubén Suárez (yellow card) 87'	Attendance: 20,871; Referee: (China) Ai Kun

22 July 2012 18	Changchun Yatai	–	Liaoning Whowin	Development Area Stadium
Sunday 20:35

28 July 2012 19	Liaoning Whowin	–	Dalian Aerbin	Tiexi Stadium
Saturday 20:30

4 August 2012 20	Qingdao Jonoon	–	Liaoning Whowin	Qingdao Tiantai Stadium
Saturday 16:30

11 August 2012 21	Liaoning Whowin	–	Jiangsu Sainty	Tiexi Stadium
Saturday 20:30

17 August 2012 22	Beijing Guoan	–	Liaoning Whowin	Workers Stadium
Friday 20:30

25 August 2012 23	Liaoning Whowin	–	Guangzhou R&F	Tiexi Stadium
Saturday 20:30

15 September 2012 24	Shanghai Shenhua	–	Liaoning Whowin	Hongkou Football Stadium
Saturday 21:00

22 September 2012 25	Liaoning Whowin	–	Hangzhou Greentown	Tiexi Stadium
Saturday 20:30

28 September 2012 26	Tianjin Teda	–	Liaoning Whowin	TEDA Football Stadium
Friday 20:30

6 October 2012 27	Liaoning Whowin	–	Dalian Shide	Tiexi Stadium
Saturday 20:30

20 October 2012 28	Shandong Luneng Taishan	–	Liaoning Whowin	Shandong Provincial Stadium
Saturday 20:30

27 October 2012 29	Guangzhou Evergrande	–	Liaoning Whowin	Tianhe Stadium
Saturday 16:30

3 November 2012 30	Liaoning Whowin	–	Shanghai Shenxin	Tiexi Stadium
Saturday 15:30

=== Chinese FA Cup ===
18 July 2012 4	Liaoning Whowin	4–3	Guangzhou R&F	Tiexi
Wednesday 20:30	Trifunović 15'; Zhao Junzhe 36' (pen.); Yang Xu 77'; Yu Hanchao 90'		Wu Weian 13'; Lu Lin 25'; Xu Bo (red card) 45'; Yakubu 56'	Stadium: Tiexi New District Sports Center
