= 2017 Campeonato Nacional Primera División =

Campeonato Nacional
- Season: 2017
- Dates: 28 July – 21 December 2017
- Champions: Colo-Colo (32nd title)
- Relegated: Santiago Wanderers
- Copa Libertadores: Colo-Colo; Santiago Wanderers (cup winners); Universidad de Concepción
- Copa Sudamericana: Unión Española; Everton; Audax Italiano; Deportes Temuco
- Matches: 122
- Goals: 279 (2.29 per match)
- Top goalscorer: Bryan Carrasco (10 goals)
- Biggest home win: Everton 4–0 San Luis (5 August); Palestino 4–0 Unión Española (14 October)
- Biggest away win: Deportes Iquique 0–4 Universidad de Concepción (30 September)
- Highest scoring: Colo-Colo 5–2 Unión Española (5 November)
- Highest attendance: 42,333 Universidad de Chile 1–0 Universidad Católica (29 October)
- Total attendance: 974,055
- Average attendance: 8,117

The 2017 Campeonato Nacional season, known as Campeonato Nacional de Transición Scotiabank 2017 for sponsorship purposes, was the 87th season of top-flight football in Chile. Colo-Colo won their thirty-second title following a 3–0 away win at Huachipato on 9 December. Universidad de Chile were the defending champions.

== Format changes ==
Starting in 2017, the ANFP approved a change from the European calendar season (July–May) that had been used since 2013 to a calendar year season (February–December). The year calendar would have been implemented for the 2017 season, however, it was postponed for one year. In order to manage this transition, the 2017 Clausura tournament, part of the 2016–17 season, was followed up by a single championship in the second semester of the year. The 2018 season will be played as a single tournament, without the Apertura-Clausura system.

== Teams ==
=== Stadia and locations ===
Locations of the 2017 Chilean Primera División teams.

Team	City	Stadium
Audax Italiano	Santiago	Bicentenario de La Florida
Colo-Colo	Santiago	Monumental David Arellano
Curicó Unido	Curicó	La Granja
Deportes Antofagasta	Antofagasta	Calvo y Bascuñán
Deportes Iquique	Iquique	Cavancha
Deportes Temuco	Temuco	Germán Becker
Everton	Viña del Mar	Sausalito
Huachipato	Talcahuano	CAP
O'Higgins	Rancagua	El Teniente
Palestino	Santiago	Municipal de La Cisterna
San Luis	Quillota	Lucio Fariña Fernández
Santiago Wanderers	Valparaíso	Elías Figueroa Brander
Unión Española	Santiago	Santa Laura-Universidad SEK
Universidad Católica	Santiago	San Carlos de Apoquindo
Universidad de Chile	Santiago	Nacional Julio Martínez Prádanos
Universidad de Concepción	Concepción	Alcaldesa Ester Roa Rebolledo

=== Personnel and kits ===
Team	Head coach	Captain	Kit manufacturer	Sponsors
Audax Italiano	(Chile) Hugo Vilches	(Chile) Nicolás Peric	Macron	Traverso
Colo-Colo	(Argentina) Pablo Guede	(Chile) Esteban Paredes	Under Armour	DirecTV
Curicó Unido	(Chile) Luis Marcoleta	(Argentina) Martín Cortés	Onefit	Multihogar
Deportes Antofagasta	(Argentina) Nicolás Larcamón	(Chile) Gonzalo Villagra	Cafu	Minera Escondida
Deportes Iquique	(Chile) Erick Guerrero (caretaker)	(Chile) Rodrigo Naranjo	Rete	UNAP
Deportes Temuco	(Argentina) Dalcio Giovagnoli	(Chile) Cristián Canío	Joma	Rosen
Everton	(Argentina) Pablo Sánchez	(Chile) Marcos Velásquez	Pirma	Viña del Mar-Fox Sports-Claro
Huachipato	(Argentina) César Vigevani	(Argentina) Omar Merlo	Mitre	PF
O'Higgins	(Argentina) Gabriel Milito	(Chile) Albert Acevedo	New Balance	VTR
Palestino	(Argentina) Germán Cavalieri	(Chile) Roberto Cereceda	Training	Bank of Palestine
San Luis	(Chile) Miguel Ramírez	(Chile) Daniel Vicencio	Luanvi	PF
Santiago Wanderers	(Chile) Nicolás Córdova	(Chile) Gabriel Castellón	Macron	Terminal Pacifico Sur Valparaiso
Unión Española	(Argentina) Martín Palermo	(Chile) Jorge Ampuero	Kappa	Universidad SEK
Universidad Católica	(Chile) Mario Salas	(Chile) Cristian Álvarez	Umbro	DirecTV
Universidad de Chile	(Argentina) Ángel Guillermo Hoyos	(Chile) Johnny Herrera	Adidas	Chevrolet
Universidad de Concepción	(Chile) Francisco Bozán	(Argentina) Alejandro Camargo	KS7	Universidad de Concepción

=== Managerial changes ===
Team	Outgoing manager	Manner of departure	Date of vacancy	Position in table	Incoming manager	Date of appointment
O'Higgins	(Argentina) Cristián Arán	Resigned	31 July	16th	(Argentina) Gabriel Milito	9 August
Deportes Iquique	(Chile) Jaime Vera	Resigned	21 October	15th	(Chile) Erick Guerrero	23 October

== Standings ==
Pos	Team	Pld	W	D	L	GF	GA	GD	Pts	Qualification
1	Colo-Colo (C)	15	10	3	2	33	13	+20	33	Qualification to Copa Libertadores group stage
2	Unión Española	15	9	4	2	18	12	+6	31	Qualification to Runners-up playoff
3	Universidad de Chile	15	9	3	3	21	18	+3	30	Qualification to Copa Libertadores group stage (Note: Universidad de Chile qualified for the Copa Libertadores group stage by winning the 2017 Clausura.)
4	Everton	15	7	5	3	24	19	+5	26	Qualification to Copa Sudamericana first stage (Note: Since the 2017 Copa Chile runners-up Universidad de Chile already qualified for South American competition based on their league position, the spot awarded to the cup runners-up (Copa Sudamericana first stage) was passed down to the next best-placed team, in this case to the sixth-placed team.)
5	Audax Italiano	15	7	4	4	24	19	+5	25	Qualification to Copa Sudamericana first stage
6	Deportes Temuco	15	5	7	3	15	12	+3	22	Qualification to Copa Sudamericana first stage
7	Deportes Antofagasta	15	5	6	4	14	13	+1	21	
8	Curicó Unido	15	5	3	7	11	14	−3	18	
9	San Luis	15	5	3	7	15	20	−5	18	
10	Universidad de Concepción	15	3	8	4	16	15	+1	17	Qualification to Runners-up playoff (Note: Since the 2017 Clausura runners-up Colo-Colo qualified for the Copa Libertadores group stage by winning the 2017 Transición, Universidad de Concepción took their place in the Runners-up playoff as the 2017 Clausura third-placed team.)
11	Universidad Católica	15	4	4	7	17	19	−2	16	
12	Huachipato	15	5	1	9	11	17	−6	16	
13	Santiago Wanderers	15	2	9	4	16	17	−1	15	Qualification to Copa Libertadores second stage (Note: Santiago Wanderers qualified for the Copa Libertadores second stage by winning the 2017 Copa Chile.)
14	O'Higgins	15	4	3	8	15	24	−9	15	
15	Palestino	15	3	4	8	18	24	−6	13	
16	Deportes Iquique	15	2	3	10	8	20	−12	9	

Source: ANFP, Soccerway
Rules for classification: 1) Points, 2) Goal difference, 3) Matches won, 4) Goals for, 5) Away goals for, 6) Red cards, 7) Yellow cards, 8) Drawing of lots.
In case there are two teams tied in points for first place: 2) Playoff game.
(C) Champions

== Results ==
Home \ Away	AUD	CC	CUR	ANT	DIQ	TEM	EVE	HUA	OHI	PAL	SL	SW	UE	UC	UCH	UDC
Audax Italiano	—	0–3	2–0	—	1–3	2–1	3–0	—	—	2–1	—	—	0–2	2–2	—	—
Colo-Colo	—	—	3–2	0–0	—	—	—	—	—	—	3–0	2–0	5–2	—	4–1	1–2
Curicó Unido	—	—	—	0–1	—	1–1	—	1–0	1–0	—	1–0	1–1	0–1	—	0–1	—
Deportes Antofagasta	1–1	—	—	—	0–0	—	—	1–0	—	2–1	—	2–2	0–0	2–4	0–2	—
Deportes Iquique	—	1–1	0–1	—	—	0–1	0–1	—	0–1	—	2–1	—	—	—	—	0–4
Deportes Temuco	—	1–0	—	1–0	—	—	0–1	0–0	2–0	—	1–1	—	—	1–0	—	1–1
Everton	—	2–3	1–1	1–0	—	—	—	—	1–1	3–1	4–0	—	—	—	—	2–1
Huachipato	2–1	0–3	—	—	1–0	—	1–2	—	—	—	—	1–0	0–1	3–1	—	—
O'Higgins	1–2	1–3	—	0–2	—	—	—	1–0	—	2–1	—	0–3	0–2	3–1	—	—
Palestino	—	1–1	2–1	—	1–0	2–2	—	0–1	—	—	1–3	0–0	4–0	—	—	—
San Luis	1–1	—	—	1–3	—	—	—	2–0	2–1	—	—	0–2	—	—	2–0	0–0
Santiago Wanderers	1–3	—	—	—	0–0	1–1	3–3	—	—	—	—	—	0–0	1–1	0–1	—
Unión Española	—	—	—	—	4–2	1–1	2–0	—	—	—	1–0	—	—	1–0	0–0	1–0
Universidad Católica	—	0–1	1–0	—	2–0	—	1–1	—	—	4–1	0–2	—	—	—	—	0–0
Universidad de Chile	0–3	—	—	—	1–0	2–1	2–2	3–2	2–2	2–1	—	—	—	1–0	—	—
Universidad de Concepción	1–1	—	0–1	0–0	—	—	—	1–0	2–2	1–1	—	2–2	—	—	1–3	—

Source: ANFP, Soccerway
Legend: Blue = home team win; Yellow = draw; Red = away team win.

== Top goalscorers ==
Rank	Name	Club	Goals
1	(Chile) Bryan Carrasco	Audax Italiano	10
2	(Chile) Hugo Droguett	Universidad de Concepción	8
2	(Chile) Roberto Gutiérrez	Palestino	8
4	(Argentina) Juan Cuevas	Everton	7
4	(Chile) Jean Paul Pineda	Santiago Wanderers	7
4	(Chile) Mauricio Pinilla	Universidad de Chile	7
4	(Chile) Patricio Rubio	Everton	7
8	(Paraguay) Cris Martínez	Deportes Temuco	6
8	(Chile) Esteban Paredes	Colo-Colo	6
8	(Chile) Jaime Valdés	Colo-Colo	6

Source: Soccerway

== Runners-up play-off ==
The runners-up playoff was played between:

- Universidad de Concepción (2017 Clausura best team not already qualified for the 2018 Copa Libertadores)
- Unión Española (2017 Transición runners-up)

The winner qualified for the 2018 Copa Libertadores second stage, while the loser qualified for the 2018 Copa Sudamericana first stage. In the event that the same team ended up as runners-up of both tournaments, the playoff would not be played and that team would qualify for the Copa Libertadores. The Copa Sudamericana berth would then be awarded to the 2017 Transición best team not already qualified.

13 December 2017	Universidad de Concepción	1–0	Unión Española	Estadio Ester Roa, Concepción
20:00 UTC–3	Gallucci 16' (o.g.)	Report		Attendance: 3,063; Referee: Jorge Osorio

20 December 2017	Unión Española	1–2	Universidad de Concepción	Estadio Santa Laura, Santiago
20:00 UTC–3	Berríos 22' (o.g.)	Report	Meneses 4'; Droguett 71'	Attendance: 3,858; Referee: Roberto Tobar

Universidad de Concepción won 3–1 on aggregate.

== Relegation ==
Relegation is determined at the end of the season by computing an average of the number of points earned per game over the three most recent tournaments: 2016 Apertura, 2017 Clausura and 2017 Transición. The team with the lowest average qualified for the relegation playoff.

=== Relegation table ===
Pos	Team	2016–17 Pts	2017 Pts	Total Pts	Total Pld	Avg	Relegation
1	Colo-Colo	52	33	85	45	1.889	
2	Universidad de Chile	51	30	81	45	1.8	
3	Unión Española	49	31	80	45	1.778	
4	Universidad Católica	54	16	70	45	1.556	
5	O'Higgins	48	15	63	45	1.4	
6	Everton	36	26	62	45	1.378	
7	Audax Italiano	37	25	62	45	1.378	
8	Deportes Temuco	38	22	60	45	1.333	
9	Deportes Iquique	50	9	59	45	1.311	
10	Deportes Antofagasta	37	21	58	45	1.289	
11	San Luis	39	18	57	45	1.267	
12	Universidad de Concepción	38	17	55	45	1.222	
13	Curicó Unido	—	18	18	15	1.2	
14	Huachipato	36	16	52	45	1.156	
15	Palestino	35	13	48	45	1.067	
16	Santiago Wanderers (R)	31	15	46	45	1.022	Qualification to Relegation playoff

== Relegation playoff ==
The relegation playoff was played by three teams: the last-placed in the relegation table (Santiago Wanderers), 2016–17 Primera B runners-up San Marcos de Arica, and 2017 Primera B champions Unión La Calera. The two Primera B teams played each other with the winner qualifying to the final against the Primera División team for promotion to the top flight for the 2018 season.

Semifinal
Santiago Wanderers	—	—	—
Bye	—	—	—
Unión La Calera	0	2	2
San Marcos de Arica	1	0	1

Final
Santiago Wanderers	1	0	1 (4)
Unión La Calera (p)	0	1	1 (5)

Semifinals

24 November 2017	San Marcos de Arica	1–0	Unión La Calera	Estadio Carlos Dittborn, Arica
22:00	Olivera 71'	Report		Attendance: 2,500; Referee: Christian Rojas

5 December 2017	Unión La Calera	2–0	San Marcos de Arica	Estadio Lucio Fariña, Quillota
20:00	Abán 7'; Morales 76'	Report		Attendance: 5,124; Referee: Eduardo Gamboa

Finals

14 December 2017	Unión La Calera	0–1	Santiago Wanderers	Estadio Lucio Fariña, Quillota
19:00		Report	Gutiérrez 25'	Attendance: 3,622; Referee: Eduardo Gamboa

21 December 2017	Santiago Wanderers	0–1 (4–5 p)	Unión La Calera	Estadio Elías Figueroa, Valparaíso
19:00		Report	Viotti 90+3'	Attendance: 13,484; Referee: Jorge Osorio
	Penalties
	Pineda (penalty scored); Cerezo (penalty scored); Medel (penalty missed); Valenzuela (penalty scored); Saldías (penalty missed); Castellón (penalty scored); Pavez (penalty missed)		(penalty scored) Rosales; (penalty scored) Abán; (penalty missed) Morales; (penalty missed) Viotti; (penalty scored) Orellana; (penalty scored) Vásquez; (penalty scored) Fierro

== Attendances ==
No.	Club	Average
1	Universidad de Chile	32,955
2	Colo-Colo	30,468
3	Santiago Wanderers	8,907
4	Universidad Católica	7,512
5	Deportes Temuco	7,385
6	Everton	6,330
7	O'Higgins	5,779
8	Unión Española	5,740
9	Deportes Antofagasta	4,145
10	Curicó Unido	3,268
11	San Luis	3,150
12	Palestino	3,030
13	Audax Italiano	2,612
14	Deportes Iquique	1,923
15	Huachipato	1,659
16	Universidad de Concepción	1,298
