= Jaime Valdés =

Chilean footballer (born 1981)

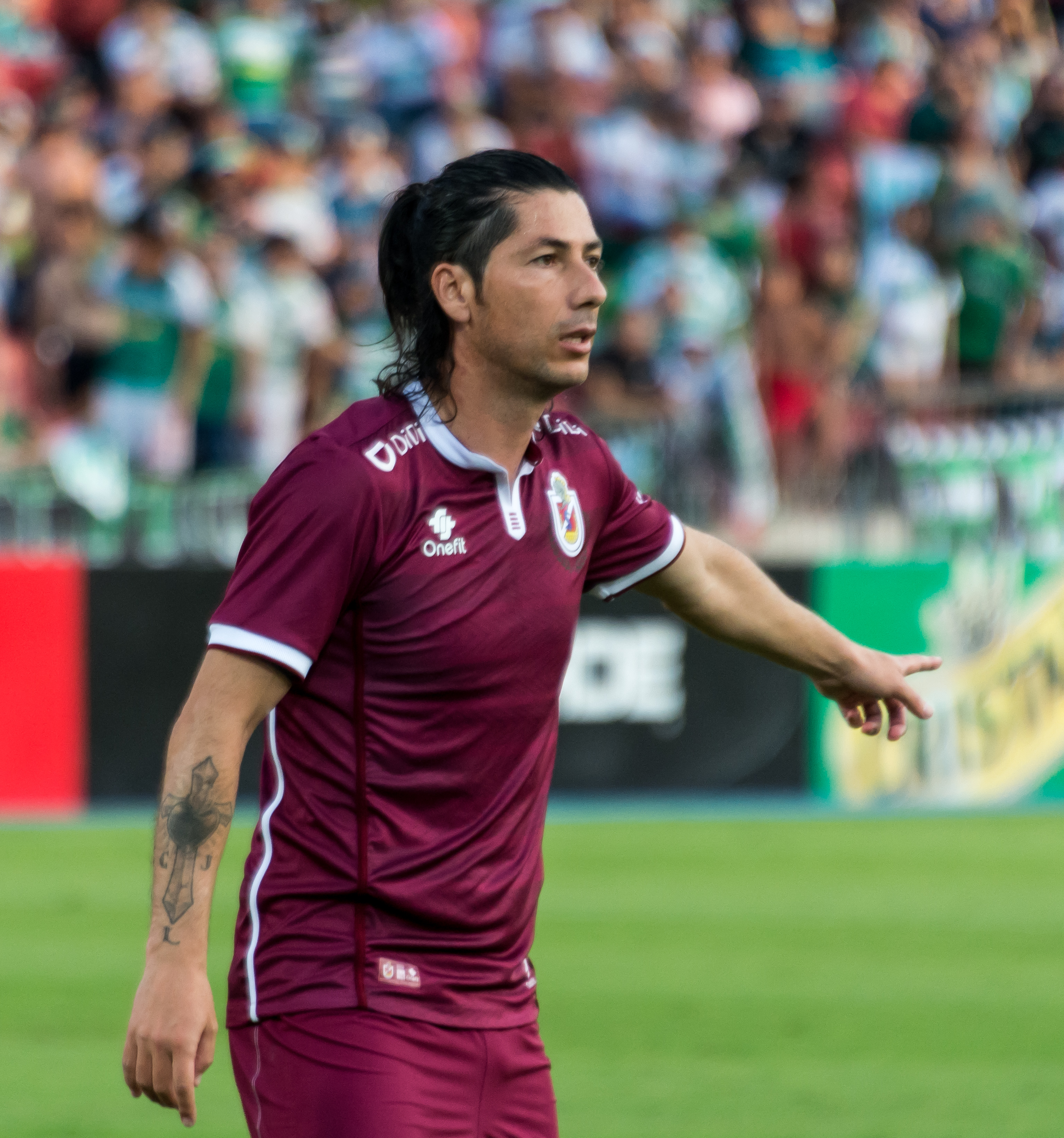
- Valdés with Deportes La Serena in 2020

Personal information
- Full name: Jaime Andrés Valdés Zapata
- Date of birth: 11 January 1981 (age 45)
- Place of birth: Santiago, Chile
- Height: 1.75 m (5 ft 9 in)
- Position: Midfielder

Youth career
- Palestino

Senior career*
| Years | Team | Apps | (Gls) |
| 1998–2000 | Palestino | 39 | (15) |
| 2000–2004 | Bari | 119 | (8) |
| 2004–2005 | Fiorentina | 5 | (0) |
| 2005–2008 | Lecce | 116 | (15) |
| 2008–2010 | Atalanta | 61 | (10) |
| 2010–2012 | Sporting CP | 24 | (5) |
| 2011–2012 | → Parma (loan) | 20 | (1) |
| 2012–2013 | Parma | 35 | (4) |
| 2014–2019 | Colo-Colo | 136 | (21) |
| 2020–2021 | Deportes La Serena | 33 | (2) |
| 2021–2022 | San Antonio Unido | 20 | (1) |
| 2022 | Santiago Wanderers | 14 | (1) |
| Total | | 622 | (83) |

International career
| 2001 | Chile U20 | 6 | (1) |
| 2001–2015 | Chile | 3 | (0) |
| 2001 | Chile B | 1 | (0) |
- * Club domestic league appearances and goals

Jaime Andrés Valdés Zapata (Spanish pronunciation: [ˈxajme βalˈdes] born 11 January 1981) is a Chilean former footballer who played as a midfielder. Valdés was member of his national under-20 national team in the 2001 FIFA World Youth Championship and has represented three times the senior team between 2001 and 2010.

Product of Palestino prolific youth ranks, he has played more than ten years in Italy, where netted 38 goals in clubs like Bari, Lecce, Atalanta and Parma, being Fiorentina the only one club where he failed to score. After years spending in Europe, in 2014, Valdés returned to Chile and reached the Torneo Clausura title, as well as was awarded as the Chilean Footballer of the Year in December of that year. Having played fourteen seasons at Italy, is the Chilean with most consecutive season in it, being over Iván Zamorano who has a season less.

== Club career ==
=== Beginnings and move to Italy ===
Valdés started his career at Santiago-based Palestino. In December 1999, he was signed by then Italian Serie A side Bari along with countryman Pascual de Gregorio. He made his Serie A debut in the next season, on 15 October 2000. He replaced Rachid Neqrouz in the 84th minute when the team was a goal down to Juventus. The matched ended in 2–0. Valdés followed the team down to Serie B after the club's June 2001 relegation and became a first-team regular in the team, replacing Antonio Cassano.

In August 2004, he was signed by Serie A side ACF Fiorentina in a co-ownership deal. As part of the deal, Massimiliano Scaglia moved in the opposite direction, also in a co-ownership deal. Valdés played his first league game for La Viola on 19 December 2004, a 2–0 victory over Chievo. He replaced Javier Portillo in the 76th minute, six minutes after Portillo scored the 2nd goal. He only played 5 Serie A matches for Fiorentina in the first half of the season.

=== Spells at Lecce and Atalanta ===
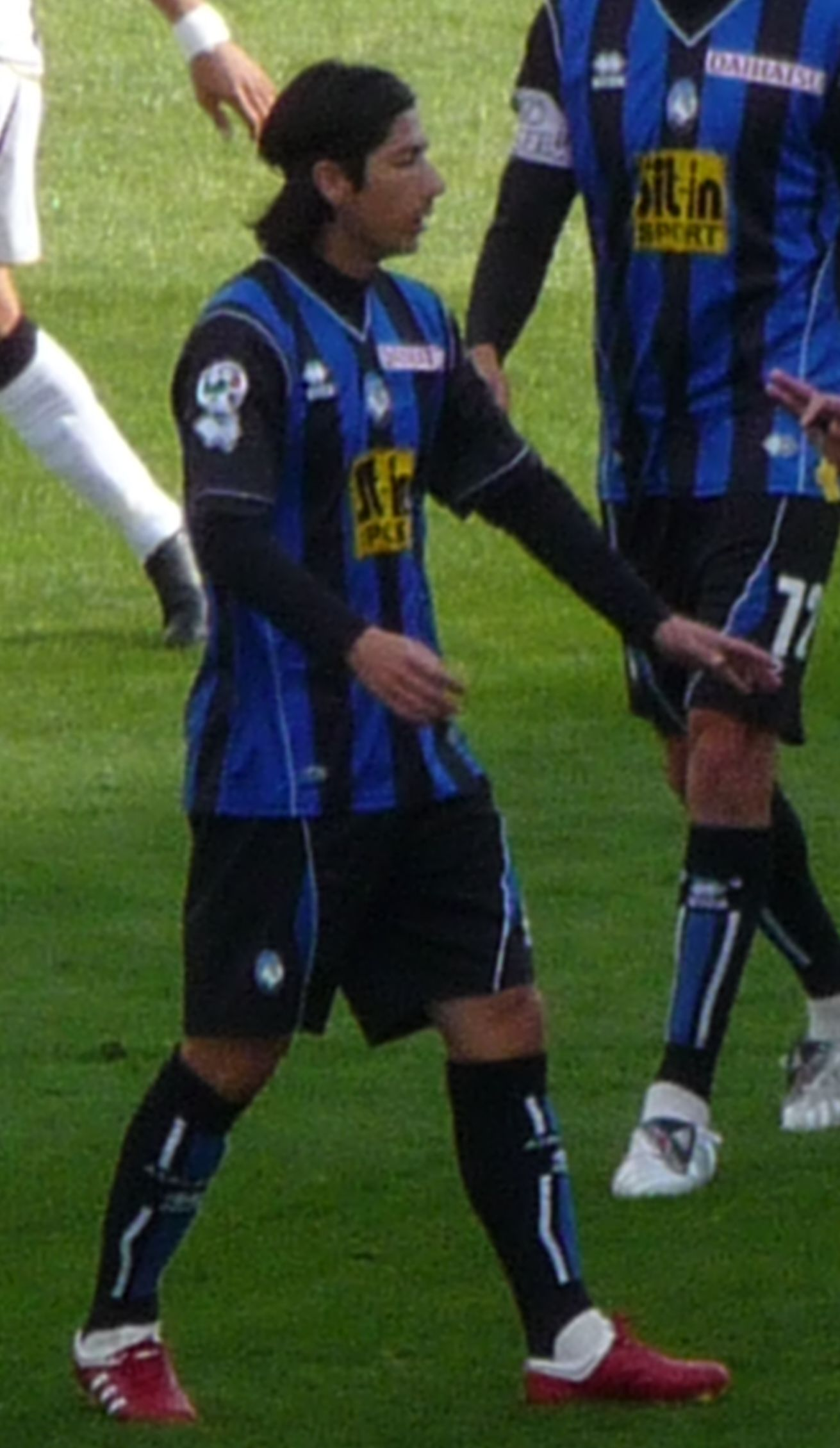
Valdés with Atalanta B.C. in 2009

In January 2005, Valeri Bojinov was transferred to ACF Fiorentina from Lecce and Fiorentina sold its 50% registration rights to Lecce as part of the deal. Lecce then bought the remain 50% rights from Bari in June 2005. He followed Lecce relegated to Serie B in June 2006. He was a regular starter in 2006–07 season, but in 2007-08 just made 14 starts in 36 Serie B appearances.

After Lecce won promotion back to Serie A, he left for fellow Serie A team Atalanta on free transfer in July 2008, which the deal already agreed in January. At first he was a substitute player but gained a regular place in November 2008. He scored 7 league goals for Atalanta in 2009–10 season.

=== Sporting CP ===
On 6 July 2010, Valdés joined Portuguese side Sporting CP from relegated Atalanta for a €2,992,500 transfer fee, signing a three-year contract with a €25 million release clause. He debuted for the club on 14 July in a 4–2 loss against Paris Saint-Germain at Parc des Princes, and scored his first goal on 25 July in a 2–1 exhibition match away win over Tottenham Hotspur, where his side's goals were scored by him and his compatriot Matías Fernández for the victory at White Hart Lane. His league debut came on 14 August in a 1–0 away loss against Paços de Ferreira, where was used as left midfielder by his manager Paulo Sérgio, who usually occupied Valdés as central midfielder. On 31 October, Valdés netted a twice in a 2–1 win over União Leiria at Leiria, scoring their first two goals in Portugal and being praised by the press. On 27 November, Valdés scored his side's goal during the derby against Porto in a 1–1 draw, having previously scored a penalty goal the last matchday in a 2–1 win over Académica at Coimbra. Then he continued his streak in the league's first round end on 8 January 2011 in a 2–1 home win over Sporting Braga.

However, after two losses, two draws and one victory, his coach Paulo Sérgio was sacked, and with José Couceiro arrival Valdés was relegated to the bench. After an unsuccessful spell with Couceiro, on 6 July 2011, it was reported that Valdés would return to Italy to join Parma on loan with a purchase option worth of €1,8 million in an exchange operation for Valeri Bojinov.

=== Parma ===
Parma exercised their option to buy the player in July 2012 after Valdés' well season.

=== Santiago Wanderers ===
In June 2022, he signed with Santiago Wanderers in the Primera B de Chile.

== International career ==
Valdés capped for Chile under-20 team at 2001 FIFA World Youth Championship. He made his senior debut in the same year, on 24 April 2001 against Uruguay. He replaced Ítalo Díaz in the 57th minute. In the same year, he made an appearance for Chile B in the friendly match against Catalonia on 28 December.

He was included in Chile's 30-men provisional 2010 FIFA World Cup squad, but later dropped after he played the warm-up match against Mexico on 16 May 2010. Valdés and Roberto Cereceda were substituted at half time by Jean Beausejour and Gonzalo Jara.

He also capped once in 2006, a match that Chile against 2006 FIFA World Cup qualifier Ivory Coast on 30 May 2006. He was replaced by Jorge Francisco Vargas in the 60th minute.

He was also called up to the senior Chile squad for a friendly against the United States in January 2015.

== Post-retirement ==
On 2 May 2023, Valdés announced his retirement as a professional player, becoming the sport manager of Deportes Linares. He was the co-owner of the club until the beginning of 2025.

In September 2014, he was invited to play the "Match for the Peace" at Rome organized by the Pope Francis and Javier Zanetti's foundation, where played alongside legends like Diego Maradona, Iván Zamorano, Paolo Maldini, Roberto Baggio, Andriy Shevchenko, among others.

In August 2025, Valdés joined the Chile national team for the Influencers World Cup Johor 2025 in Malaysia, alongside Roberto Gutiérrez and Mark González.

== Honours ==
=== Club ===
Colo-Colo

- Torneo Clausura: 2014–C, 2015–A, Transición 2017
- Copa Chile: 2016
- Supercopa de Chile (2): 2017, 2018

Individual

- Chilean Footballer of the Year: 2014, 2017
