= 2017 in Chilean football =

== 2017 ==
January 11 2017 China Cup	Chile	1–1 (4–1 p)	Croatia	Nanning, China
19:35 (UTC+8)	Pinares 18'	Report	Andrijašević 76'	Stadium: Guangxi Sports Center; Attendance: 6,686; Referee: Fu Ming (China)
	Penalties
	Vargas (penalty scored); Galdames (penalty scored); Beausejour (penalty scored); Ramos (penalty scored)		(penalty scored) Pivarić; (penalty missed) Antolić; (penalty missed) Marić

January 15 2017 China Cup	Chile	1–0	Iceland	Nanning, China
15:35 (UTC+8)	Sagal 19'	Report		Stadium: Guangxi Sports Center

March 23 2018 FIFA World Cup Qualifiers	Argentina	1–0	Chile	Buenos Aires, Argentina
20:30 UTC−3	Messi 16' (pen.)	Report (FIFA); Report (CONMEBOL)		Stadium: Estadio Alberto J. Armando, Buenos Aires; Referee: Sandro Ricci (Brazil)

March 28 2018 FIFA World Cup Qualifiers	Chile	3–1	Venezuela	Santiago, Chile (Note: Chile were sanctioned by FIFA to play one home match (against Bolivia on 6 September 2016) away from Estadio Nacional Julio Martínez Prádanos, Santiago due to homophobic chants by the team’s fans, with a possible ban on a second match subject to a probation period of two years. Since Chile committed another infringement during this period, a second match ban on playing at Estadio Nacional Julio Martínez Prádanos will be served (against Venezuela on 28 March 2017).)
19:00 UTC−3	Sánchez 4'; Paredes 7', 22'	Report (FIFA); Report (CONMEBOL)	Rondón 62'	Stadium: Estadio Monumental David Arellano; Referee: Andrés Cunha (Uruguay)

June 2 Friendly	Chile	3–0	Burkina Faso	Santiago, Chile
20:30 (UTC−4)	Vidal 10', 75'; Sagal 86'	Report		Stadium: Estadio Nacional; Referee: Diego Abal (Argentina)

June 9 Friendly	Russia	1–1	Chile	Moscow, Russia
	Vasin 67'	Report	Isla 56'	Stadium: VEB Arena; Referee: Jesús Gil Manzano (Spain)

June 13 Friendly	Romania	3–2	Chile	Cluj-Napoca, Romania
	Stancu 31'; Stanciu 60'; Băluță 83'	Report	Vargas 8'; Valencia 18'	Stadium: Cluj Arena; Attendance: 18,000; Referee: Bas Nijhuis (Netherlands)

June 18 2017 FIFA Confederations Cup	Cameroon	0–2	Chile	Moscow, Russia
21:00 (UTC+3)		Report	Vidal 81'; Vargas 90+2'	Stadium: Otkrytiye Arena; Attendance: 33,492; Referee: Damir Skomina (Slovenia)

June 22 2017 FIFA Confederations Cup	Germany	1–1	Chile	Kazan, Russia
21:00 (UTC+3)	Stindl 41'	Report	Sánchez 6'	Stadium: Kazan Arena; Attendance: 38,222; Referee: Alireza Faghani (Iran)

June 25 2017 FIFA Confederations Cup	Chile	1–1	Australia	Moscow, Russia
18:00 (UTC+3)	Rodríguez 67'	Report	Troisi 42'	Stadium: Otkrytiye Arena; Attendance: 33,639; Referee: Gianluca Rocchi (Italy)

June 28 2017 FIFA Confederations Cup	Portugal	0–0 (a.e.t.) (0–3 p)	Chile	Kazan, Russia
21:00 (UTC+3)		Report		Stadium: Kazan Arena; Attendance: 40,855; Referee: Alireza Faghani (Iran)
	Penalties
	Quaresma (penalty missed); Moutinho (penalty missed); Nani (penalty missed)		(penalty scored) Vidal; (penalty scored) Aránguiz; (penalty scored) Sánchez

July 2 2017 FIFA Confederations Cup Final	Chile	0–1	Germany	Saint Petersburg, Russia
21:00 (UTC+3)		Report	Stindl 20'	Stadium: Krestovsky Stadium; Attendance: 57,268; Referee: Milorad Mažić (Serbia)

August 31 2018 FIFA World Cup Qualifiers	Chile	0–3	Paraguay	Santiago, Chile
		Report (FIFA); Report (CONMEBOL)	Vidal 24' (o.g.); Cáceres 55'; Ortiz 90+2'	Stadium: Estadio Monumental David Arellano; Referee: Néstor Pitana

September 5 2018 FIFA World Cup Qualifiers	Bolivia	1–0	Chile	La Paz, Bolivia
16:00 (UTC−4)	Arce 59' (pen.)	Report (FIFA); Report (CONMEBOL)		Stadium: Estadio Hernando Siles; Referee: Wilmar Roldán (Colombia)

October 5 2018 FIFA World Cup Qualifiers	Chile	2–1	Ecuador	Santiago, Chile
	Vargas 22'; Sánchez 85'	Report (FIFA); Report (CONMEBOL)	Ibarra 82'	Stadium: Estadio Monumental David Arellano; Referee: Sandro Ricci

October 10 2018 FIFA World Cup Qualifiers	Brazil	3–0	Chile	São Paulo, Brazil
	Paulinho 55'; Gabriel Jesus 57', 90+2'	Report (FIFA); Report (CONMEBOL)		Stadium: Allianz Parque
