= Kjartan Finnbogason =

Icelandic international footballer

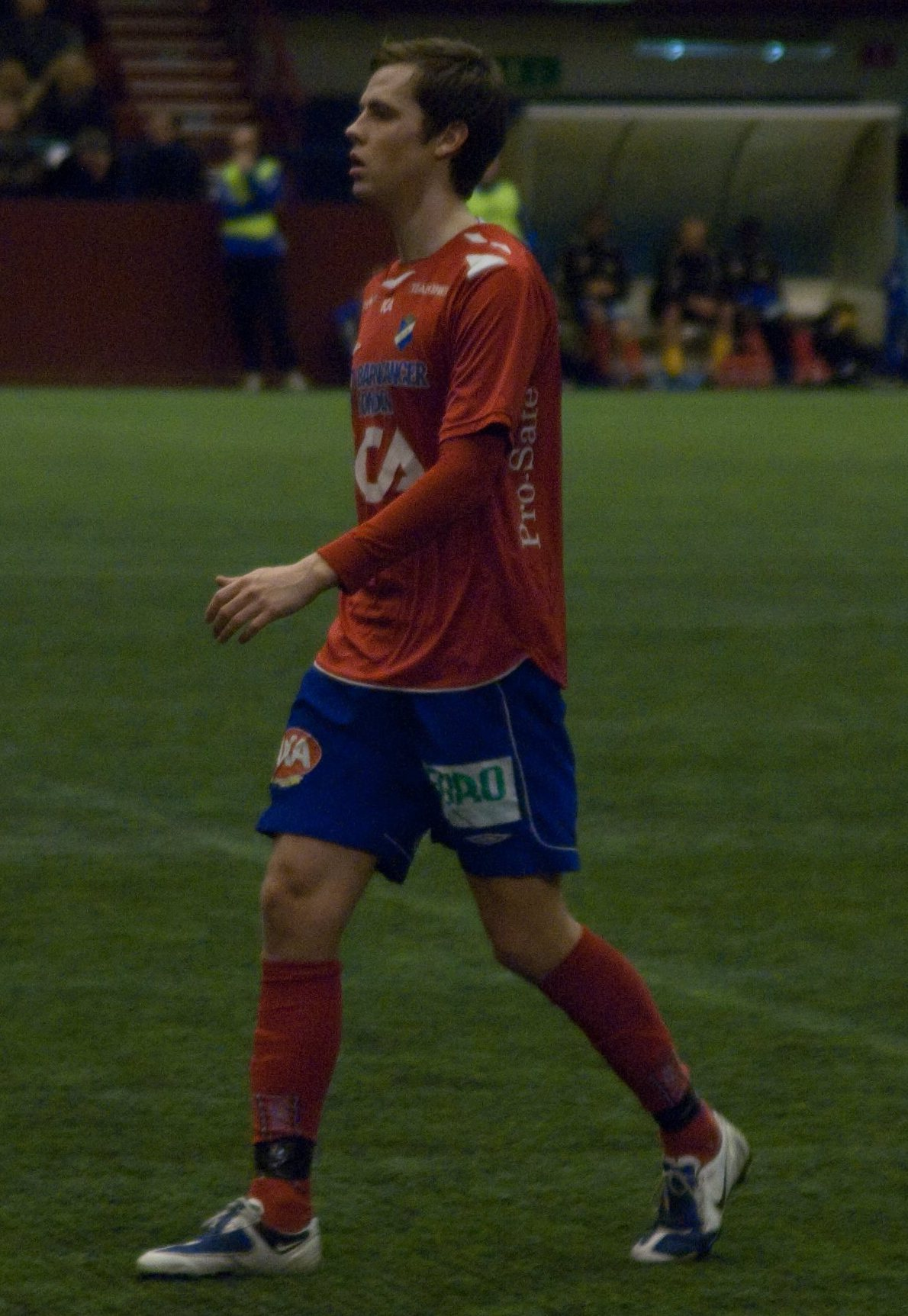

Personal information
- Full name: Kjartan Henry Finnbogason
- Date of birth: 9 July 1986 (age 40)
- Place of birth: Reykjavík, Iceland
- Height: 1.90 m (6 ft 3 in)
- Position: Striker

Team information
- Current team: FH
- Number: 9

Senior career*
Years	Team	Apps	(Gls)
2003–2004	KR Reykjavík	16	(2)
2005–2008	Celtic	0	(0)
2006	→ Queen's Park (loan)	0	(0)
2007	→ Åtvidabergs FF (loan)	6	(1)
2008–2010	Sandefjord	22	(10)
2009–2010	→ Falkirk (loan)	7	(1)
2010–2014	KR Reykjavík	115	(53)
2014–2018	AC Horsens	119	(50)
2018–2019	Ferencváros	14	(6)
2019–2020	Vejle BK	42	(21)
2020–2021	AC Horsens	7	(2)
2021	Esbjerg fB	8	(2)
2021-2022	KR	35	(11)
2023	FH	24	(11)

International career^{‡}
2011–2020	Iceland	13	(3)
- * Club domestic league appearances and goals as of 10 November 2023 ‡ National team caps and goals as of 19 January 2020

Kjartan Henry Finnbogason (born 9 July 1986) is an Icelandic international footballer who plays as a striker for FH. He has represented Iceland at international level.

== Club career ==
Kjartan was born in Reykjavík, Iceland. He was signed by Celtic in December 2004. Although signing for the club as a member of their youth academy, he was loaned to Queen's Park in the 2005–06 season to gain first team experience, but he suffered a broken foot and soon returned to Celtic Park. Despite scoring 28 goals in 20 reserve appearances for the Glasgow club, he failed to make a single first team appearance and left after less than two years. It was reported in the Scottish press that Kjartan was unhappy with the way he was treated. Sources claimed he was disenchanted with the lack of first team opportunities given to him by manager Gordon Strachan. Celtic were initially going to offer him a contract, but due to notable disagreements Kjartan handed in a transfer request.

He had several trial offers from English clubs and he made public his intention to play in the Premier League. Kjartan accepted a trial from Bristol City at the start of the 2007–08 season and went on the clubs Latvian tour against Skonto FC and FK Žalgiris Vilnius, but did not impress sufficiently and was released after the tour.

He made a good impression at Falkirk after scoring in the 2–1 defeat of Livingston on 5 August 2009 as a trialist attacker in a friendly. In August 2009, Kjartan signed a six-month loan deal at Falkirk, with an option of a permanent deal. He scored on his debut, against Dundee United on 29 August 2009.

He signed for Sandefjord Fotball in January 2010. Kjartan then signed for KR Reykjavik in 2010 making a two-year contract. Playing in shirt number 6 he scored 9 goals in all competitions. During the 2011 season, Kjartan played in shirt number 10. After 18 league games, KR Reykjavik was at the top of the table and Kjartan had scored 12 goals in the league. Kjartan broke a club record for KR Reykjavik scoring his seventh goal against MŠK Žilina in nine UEFA Cup appearances in 2011, making him the highest goal scorer in the clubs UEFA Cup history.

=== Ferencváros ===
He scored a hat-trick in the second round proper of the 2018–19 Magyar Kupa season against Sárvári FC.

He was the top scorer of the 2018-19 Magyar Kupa season.

=== Vejle ===
On 20 January 2019, Kjartan signed for Vejle Boldklub.

=== Return to Horsens ===
After terminating his deal with Vejle, Finnbogason returned to AC Horsens on 6 October 2020, signing a deal until June 2021. His contract was terminated by mutual consent in January 2021 for personal reasons, with Kjartan expressing an interest in returning to Iceland.

=== Esbjerg ===
On 1 February 2021, Kjartan signed a 2000 -month contract with second-tier Danish 1st Division club Esbjerg fB. Efter two goals in seven league games, Finnbogason's deal was terminated by mutual agreement on 11 May 2021, one day after the club's head coach, Ólafur Kristjánsson, was fired.

== International career ==
Kjartan scored his first ever international goal against China in the 2017 China Cup.

=== International goals ===
Scores and results list Iceland's goal tally first.

#	Date	Venue	Opponent	Score	Result	Competition
1.	10 January 2017	Guangxi Sports Center, Nanning, China	China	1–0	2–0	2017 China Cup
2.	8 November 2017	Abdullah bin Khalifa Stadium, Doha, Qatar	Czech Republic	1–1	1–2	Friendly
3.	19 January 2020	Dignity Health Sports Park, Carson, United States	El Salvador	1–0	1–0	Friendly
