= Wang Jingbin =

Chinese footballer

Wang Jingbin 王靖斌
Personal information
- Full name: Wang Jingbin
- Date of birth: 9 May 1995 (age 31)
- Place of birth: Benxi, Liaoning, China
- Height: 1.85 m (6 ft 1 in)
- Positions: Striker; winger

Team information
- Current team: Guangdong GZ-Power
- Number: 29

Youth career
- 2005–2009: Shenyang Xinyuanxiang
- 2010–2014: Guizhou Renhe
- 2014–2015: Guangzhou Evergrande

Senior career*
| Years | Team | Apps | (Gls) |
| 2012 | Shaanxi Laochenggen | 0 | (0) |
| 2015–2020 | Guangzhou Evergrande | 4 | (0) |
| 2016 | → Fagiano Okayama (loan) | 0 | (0) |
| 2018 | → Shanghai Shenxin (loan) | 14 | (0) |
| 2020 | → Shenyang Urban (loan) | 13 | (1) |
| 2021 | Liaoning Shenyang Urban | 25 | (0) |
| 2022 | Wuhan Yangtze River | 26 | (0) |
| 2023 | Yunnan Yukun | 9 | (0) |
| 2024 | Guangxi Pingguo Haliao | 20 | (5) |
| 2025 | Shijiazhuang Gongfu | 21 | (4) |
| 2026– | Guangdong GZ-Power | 0 | (0) |

International career^{‡}
| 2016–2017 | China U23 | 11 | (3) |
| 2017– | China | 2 | (1) |
- * Club domestic league appearances and goals as of 31 December 2025 ‡ National team caps and goals as of 21 July 2017

Wang Jingbin
- Chinese: 王靖斌
Transcriptions
Standard Mandarin
- Hanyu Pinyin: Wáng Jìngbīn
- IPA: [wǎŋ tɕîŋ píŋ]

Wang Jingbin (Chinese: 王靖斌; pinyin: Wáng Jìngbīn; born 9 May 1995) is a Chinese footballer who currently plays for Guangdong GZ-Power in the China League One.

== Club career ==
Wang Jingbin started his football career in when he joined Guizhou Renhe's youth academy in 2010. He then joined China League Two side Shaanxi Laochenggen in the 2012 season and returned to Guizhou shortly after. He transferred to Chinese Super League side Guangzhou Evergrande in 2014 after a successful trial and was promoted to the first team squad in the summer of 2015 by Luiz Felipe Scolari. On 29 July 2016, Wang was loaned to J2 League club Fagiano Okayama until the end of 2016 season. He didn't appear for the Fagi throughout the entirety of his loan spell.

Wang returned to Guangzhou for the 2017 season, and made his senior club debut on 16 April 2017 in a 3–0 away win against Tianjin Teda as the benefit of the new rule of the league that at least one Under-23 player must be in the starting line-up. He was substituted off by Zheng Long in the 27th minute. At the end of the 2017 season, Wang went on to make five appearances for the club in all competitions.

Wang was loaned to China League One side Shanghai Shenxin for one season in February 2018. On 11 March 2018, he made his debut in a 1–0 home loss to Wuhan Zall. He scored his first goal on 10 April 2018 in a 3–1 away win over League Two club Hunan Billows in the third round of the 2018 Chinese FA Cup.

== International career ==
On 3 January 2017, Wang was selected in the Chinese national team's squad for the 2017 China Cup by Marcello Lippi as the replacement for Wu Lei. He made his debut for China on 10 January 2017 in a 2–0 loss against Iceland, coming on as a substitution for Cao Yunding in the 80th minute. He scored his first international goal on 14 January 2017 in a 1–1 draw with Croatia in the third place playoff.

== Career statistics ==
=== Club statistics ===
As of 31 December 2025.

Appearances and goals by club, season and competition
| Club | Season | League | | | National Cup | | Continental | | Other | | Total | |
| Club | Season | Division | Apps | Goals | Apps | Goals | Apps | Goals | Apps | Goals | Apps | Goals |
|---|---|---|---|---|---|---|---|---|---|---|---|---|
| Shaanxi Laochenggen | 2012 | China League Two | 0 | 0 | 0 | 0 | - | | - | | 0 | 0 |
| Guangzhou Evergrande | 2015 | Chinese Super League | 0 | 0 | 0 | 0 | 0 | 0 | 0 (Note: Appearances in Chinese FA Super Cup) | 0 | 0 | 0 |
| Guangzhou Evergrande | 2016 | Chinese Super League | 0 | 0 | 0 | 0 | 0 | 0 | 0 | 0 | 0 | 0 |
| Guangzhou Evergrande | 2017 | Chinese Super League | 4 | 0 | 1 | 0 | 0 | 0 | 0 | 0 | 5 | 0 |
| Guangzhou Evergrande | Total | | 4 | 0 | 1 | 0 | 0 | 0 | 0 | 0 | 5 | 0 |
| Fagiano Okayama (loan) | 2016 | J2 League | 0 | 0 | 0 | 0 | - | | - | | 0 | 0 |
| Shanghai Shenxin (loan) | 2018 | Chinese League One | 14 | 0 | 2 | 1 | - | | - | | 16 | 1 |
| Shenyang Urban (loan) | 2020 | Chinese League One | 13 | 1 | 0 | 0 | - | | - | | 13 | 1 |
| Liaoning Shenyang Urban | 2021 | Chinese League One | 25 | 0 | 0 | 0 | - | | - | | 25 | 0 |
| Wuhan Yangtze River | 2022 | Chinese Super League | 26 | 0 | 1 | 1 | - | | - | | 27 | 1 |
| Yunnan Yukun | 2023 | China League Two | 9 | 0 | 0 | 0 | - | | - | | 9 | 0 |
| Guangxi Pingguo Haliao | 2024 | Chinese League One | 20 | 5 | 3 | 0 | - | | - | | 23 | 5 |
| Shijiazhuang Gongfu | 2025 | Chinese League One | 21 | 4 | 2 | 0 | - | | - | | 23 | 4 |
| Career total | | | 132 | 10 | 9 | 2 | 0 | 0 | 0 | 0 | 141 | 12 |

=== International statistics ===
National team
| Year | Apps | Goals |
|---|---|---|
| 2017 | 2 | 1 |
| Total | 2 | 1 |

=== International goals ===
As of 14 January 2017

| No | Date | Venue | Opponent | Score | Result | Competition |
|---|---|---|---|---|---|---|
| 1. | 14 January 2017 | Guangxi Sports Center, Nanning, China | Croatia | 1–1 | 1–1 (4–3 p) | 2017 China Cup |

== Honours ==
=== Club ===
Guangzhou Evergrande

- Chinese Super League: 2015, 2017
- AFC Champions League: 2015
- Chinese FA Super Cup: 2017

Guangdong GZ-Power

- China League One: 2026
