= 2018 China Cup =

Tournament details
- Host country: China
- Dates: 22–26 March
- Teams: 4 (from 3 confederations)
- Venue: 1 (in 1 host city)

Final positions
- Champions: Uruguay (1st title)
- Runners-up: Wales
- Third place: Czech Republic
- Fourth place: China

Tournament statistics
- Matches played: 4
- Goals scored: 14 (3.5 per match)
- Attendance: 116,201 (29,050 per match)
- Top scorer(s): (Wales) Gareth Bale (3 goals)
- Best player: (Uruguay) Edinson Cavani

The 2018 Gree China Cup International Football Championship (Chinese: 2018年格力中国杯国际足球锦标赛) was the second edition of the China Cup, an international football tournament held in China annually. It was played from 22 to 26 March 2018 in Nanning, Guangxi, China.

The winning team was Uruguay, who beat Wales 1–0 in the final.

== Participating teams ==
On 8 November 2017, it was announced that Czech Republic, Uruguay and Wales would participate in the 2018 China Cup.

Team	FIFA Ranking (March 2018)
Wales	20
Uruguay	22
Czech Republic	43
China (host)	65

== Mascot ==
With 65,554 votes, Longbao (Note: simplified Chinese: 龙宝; traditional Chinese: 龍寶; pinyin: Lóng Bǎo; Mandarin pronunciation: [lʊ̌ŋ pàʊ], in quick speech, [lʊ̌m-]) was elected as the official mascot for the 2018 Gree China Cup International Football Championship. Longbao’s design was drawn from a Chinese dragon (Long), an essential cultural symbol of strength, good luck and auspicious powers.

== Venue ==
Nanning	Location of the host city of the 2018 China Cup.
Guangxi Sports Center	Location of the host city of the 2018 China Cup.
22.767°N 108.388°E	Location of the host city of the 2018 China Cup.
Capacity: 60,000	Location of the host city of the 2018 China Cup.

== Match officials ==
The following referees were chosen for the 2018 China Cup.

Referees

- (Australia) Chris Beath
- (Malaysia) Amirul Izwan Yaacob
- (Qatar) Saoud Ali Al-Adba
- (Qatar) Salman Ahmad Falahi

Assistant referees

- (Australia) George Lakrindis
- (Malaysia) Mohammad bin Zainal
- (Qatar) Juma Al-Burshaid
- (Qatar) Mohammad Darman

== Squads ==
- Age, caps and goals as of the start of the tournament, 22 March 2018.

=== China ===
China

Coach: (Italy) Marcello Lippi

No.	Pos.	Player	Date of birth (age)	Caps	Goals	Club
1	GK	Zeng Cheng	8 January 1987 (aged 31)	41	0	(Chinese Football Association) Guangzhou Evergrande
2	DF	Liu Yiming	28 February 1995 (aged 23)	3	0	(Chinese Football Association) Tianjin Quanjian
3	DF	Zheng Zheng	11 July 1989 (aged 28)	14	2	(Chinese Football Association) Shandong Luneng
4	DF	Li Xuepeng	18 September 1988 (aged 29)	27	0	(Chinese Football Association) Guangzhou Evergrande
6	DF	Feng Xiaoting (captain)	22 October 1985 (aged 32)	64	0	(Chinese Football Association) Guangzhou Evergrande
7	FW	Wu Lei	19 November 1991 (aged 26)	48	8	(Chinese Football Association) Shanghai SIPG
8	MF	Cai Huikang	10 October 1989 (aged 28)	20	0	(Chinese Football Association) Shanghai SIPG
9	FW	Xiao Zhi	28 May 1985 (aged 32)	8	2	(Chinese Football Association) Guangzhou R&F
11	MF	Hao Junmin	24 March 1987 (aged 30)	66	12	(Chinese Football Association) Shandong Luneng
12	GK	Yan Junling	28 January 1991 (aged 27)	7	0	(Chinese Football Association) Shanghai SIPG
13	MF	He Chao	19 April 1995 (aged 22)	2	0	(Chinese Football Association) Changchun Yatai
14	DF	Jiang Zhipeng	6 March 1989 (aged 29)	23	0	(Chinese Football Association) Hebei China Fortune
16	MF	Huang Bowen	13 July 1987 (aged 30)	43	3	(Chinese Football Association) Guangzhou Evergrande
17	DF	Fan Xiaodong	2 March 1987 (aged 31)	3	0	(Chinese Football Association) Changchun Yatai
18	FW	Gao Lin	14 February 1986 (aged 32)	97	20	(Chinese Football Association) Guangzhou Evergrande
19	FW	Wei Shihao	8 April 1995 (aged 22)	3	2	(Chinese Football Association) Beijing Guoan
20	MF	Yu Hanchao	25 February 1987 (aged 31)	50	9	(Chinese Football Association) Guangzhou Evergrande
21	DF	Deng Hanwen	8 January 1995 (aged 23)	7	2	(Chinese Football Association) Guangzhou Evergrande
22	FW	Yu Dabao	18 April 1988 (aged 29)	45	17	(Chinese Football Association) Beijing Guoan
23	GK	Wang Dalei	10 January 1989 (aged 29)	26	0	(Chinese Football Association) Shandong Luneng
24	MF	Zhao Xuri (vice-captain)	3 December 1985 (aged 32)	73	2	(Chinese Football Association) Tianjin Quanjian
25	DF	He Guan	25 January 1993 (aged 25)	3	0	(Chinese Football Association) Shanghai SIPG
28	DF	Wang Shenchao	8 February 1989 (aged 29)	4	0	(Chinese Football Association) Shanghai SIPG
29	FW	Tan Long	1 April 1988 (aged 29)	0	0	(Chinese Football Association) Changchun Yatai
30	MF	Peng Xinli	22 July 1991 (aged 26)	0	0	(Chinese Football Association) Chongqing Lifan
	MF	Wu Xi	19 February 1989 (aged 29)	47	3	(Chinese Football Association) Jiangsu Suning

=== Czech Republic ===
Czech Republic

Coach: (Czech Republic) Karel Jarolím

No.	Pos.	Player	Date of birth (age)	Caps	Goals	Club
1	GK	Tomáš Vaclík	29 March 1989 (aged 28)	18	0	(Swiss Football Association) Basel
2	DF	Pavel Kadeřábek	25 April 1992 (aged 25)	30	2	(German Football Association) 1899 Hoffenheim
3	DF	Tomáš Kalas	22 May 1993 (aged 24)	11	0	(The Football Association) Fulham
4	DF	Theodor Gebre Selassie	24 December 1986 (aged 31)	45	3	(German Football Association) Werder Bremen
5	MF	Lukáš Masopust	12 February 1993 (aged 25)	0	0	(Football Association of the Czech Republic) Jablonec
6	DF	Michael Lüftner	14 March 1994 (aged 24)	1	0	(Danish Football Association) Copenhagen
7	MF	Antonín Barák	3 December 1994 (aged 23)	7	5	(Italian Football Federation) Udinese
8	MF	Vladimír Darida	8 August 1990 (aged 27)	49	4	(German Football Association) Hertha BSC
9	MF	Martin Frýdek	24 March 1992 (aged 25)	5	0	(Football Association of the Czech Republic) Sparta Prague
11	FW	Michael Krmenčík	15 March 1993 (aged 25)	11	6	(Football Association of the Czech Republic) Viktoria Plzeň
13	MF	Jan Kopic	4 June 1990 (aged 27)	9	3	(Football Association of the Czech Republic) Viktoria Plzeň
15	MF	Tomáš Souček	27 February 1995 (aged 23)	8	1	(Football Association of the Czech Republic) Slavia Prague
16	GK	Tomáš Koubek	26 August 1992 (aged 25)	6	0	(French Football Federation) Rennes
17	DF	Marek Suchý (captain)	29 March 1988 (aged 29)	36	1	(Swiss Football Association) Basel
18	DF	Jan Bořil	11 January 1991 (aged 27)	4	0	(Football Association of the Czech Republic) Slavia Prague
19	FW	Patrik Schick	24 January 1996 (aged 22)	5	1	(Italian Football Federation) Roma
20	MF	Michal Trávník	17 May 1994 (aged 23)	0	0	(Football Association of the Czech Republic) Jablonec
21	FW	Stanislav Tecl	1 September 1990 (aged 27)	1	0	(Football Association of the Czech Republic) Jablonec
22	DF	Filip Novák	26 June 1990 (aged 27)	12	1	(Turkish Football Federation) Trabzonspor
23	GK	Jiří Pavlenka	14 April 1992 (aged 25)	4	0	(German Football Association) Werder Bremen
26	DF	Jakub Jugas	5 May 1992 (aged 25)	0	0	(Football Association of the Czech Republic) Slavia Prague

=== Uruguay ===
Uruguay

Coach: (Uruguay) Óscar Tabárez

No.	Pos.	Player	Date of birth (age)	Caps	Goals	Club
1	GK	Fernando Muslera	16 June 1986 (aged 31)	94	0	(Turkish Football Federation) Galatasaray
2	DF	José Giménez	20 January 1995 (aged 23)	39	4	(Royal Spanish Football Federation) Atlético Madrid
3	DF	Diego Godín (captain)	16 February 1986 (aged 32)	113	8	(Royal Spanish Football Federation) Atlético Madrid
4	DF	Guillermo Varela	24 March 1993 (aged 24)	1	0	(Uruguayan Football Association) Peñarol
5	MF	Carlos Sánchez	2 December 1984 (aged 33)	33	1	(Mexican Football Federation) Monterrey
6	MF	Rodrigo Bentancur	5 June 1997 (aged 20)	4	0	(Italian Football Federation) Juventus
7	MF	Cristian Rodríguez	30 September 1985 (aged 32)	102	11	(Uruguayan Football Association) Peñarol
8	MF	Nahitan Nández	28 December 1995 (aged 22)	9	0	(Argentine Football Association) Boca Juniors
9	FW	Luis Suárez	24 January 1987 (aged 31)	95	49	(Royal Spanish Football Federation) Barcelona
10	MF	Giorgian De Arrascaeta	1 May 1994 (aged 23)	12	1	(Brazilian Football Confederation) Cruzeiro
11	FW	Cristhian Stuani	10 December 1986 (aged 31)	38	5	(Royal Spanish Football Federation) Girona
12	GK	Martín Campaña	29 May 1989 (aged 28)	1	0	(Argentine Football Association) Independiente
13	DF	Gastón Silva	5 March 1994 (aged 24)	16	0	(Argentine Football Association) Independiente
14	MF	Lucas Torreira	11 February 1996 (aged 22)	0	0	(Italian Football Federation) Sampdoria
15	MF	Matías Vecino	24 August 1991 (aged 26)	19	1	(Italian Football Federation) Internazionale
16	DF	Maxi Pereira	8 June 1984 (aged 33)	124	3	(Portuguese Football Federation) Porto
17	MF	Diego Laxalt	7 February 1993 (aged 25)	3	0	(Italian Football Federation) Genoa
18	FW	Maxi Gómez	14 August 1996 (aged 21)	2	0	(Royal Spanish Football Federation) Celta Vigo
19	DF	Sebastián Coates	7 October 1990 (aged 27)	29	1	(Portuguese Football Federation) Sporting CP
20	MF	Gastón Ramírez	2 December 1990 (aged 27)	42	0	(Italian Football Federation) Sampdoria
21	FW	Edinson Cavani	14 February 1987 (aged 31)	98	40	(French Football Federation) Paris Saint-Germain
23	GK	Martín Silva	23 March 1983 (aged 34)	11	0	(Brazilian Football Confederation) Vasco da Gama

=== Wales ===
Wales

Coach: (Wales) Ryan Giggs

No.	Pos.	Player	Date of birth (age)	Caps	Goals	Club
1	GK	Wayne Hennessey	24 January 1987 (aged 31)	73	0	(The Football Association) Crystal Palace
2	DF	Chris Gunter	21 July 1989 (aged 28)	85	0	(The Football Association) Reading
3	DF	Adam Matthews	13 January 1992 (aged 26)	13	0	(The Football Association) Sunderland
4	DF	Ben Davies	24 April 1993 (aged 24)	36	0	(The Football Association) Tottenham Hotspur
5	DF	James Chester	23 January 1989 (aged 29)	29	0	(The Football Association) Aston Villa
6	DF	Ashley Williams (captain)	23 August 1984 (aged 33)	76	2	(The Football Association) Everton
7	MF	Joe Allen	14 March 1990 (aged 28)	40	2	(The Football Association) Stoke City
8	MF	Andy King	29 October 1988 (aged 29)	44	2	(Football Association of Wales) Swansea City
9	FW	Sam Vokes	21 October 1989 (aged 28)	56	8	(The Football Association) Burnley
10	FW	Tom Bradshaw	27 July 1992 (aged 25)	2	0	(The Football Association) Barnsley
11	FW	Gareth Bale	16 July 1989 (aged 28)	68	26	(Royal Spanish Football Federation) Real Madrid
12	GK	Chris Maxwell	30 July 1990 (aged 27)	0	0	(The Football Association) Preston North End
13	FW	Billy Bodin	24 March 1992 (aged 25)	0	0	(The Football Association) Preston North End
14	DF	Declan John	30 June 1995 (aged 22)	2	0	(Scottish Football Association) Rangers
15	MF	Lee Evans	24 July 1994 (aged 23)	1	0	(The Football Association) Sheffield United
16	FW	Harry Wilson	22 March 1997 (aged 21)	1	0	(The Football Association) Hull City
17	MF	Marley Watkins	17 October 1990 (aged 27)	1	0	(The Football Association) Norwich City
18	DF	Chris Mepham	5 November 1997 (aged 20)	0	0	(The Football Association) Brentford
19	DF	Connor Roberts	23 September 1995 (aged 22)	0	0	(Football Association of Wales) Swansea City
20	MF	Ryan Hedges	8 July 1995 (aged 22)	1	0	(The Football Association) Barnsley
21	GK	Michael Crowe	13 November 1995 (aged 22)	0	0	(The Football Association) Ipswich Town
22	FW	Ben Woodburn	15 October 1999 (aged 18)	6	1	(The Football Association) Liverpool
23	DF	Tom Lockyer	3 December 1994 (aged 23)	1	0	(The Football Association) Bristol Rovers

== Matches ==
The official draw was announced on 5 December 2017. The schedule was announced on 17 December 2017. All times are local, CST (UTC+8).

=== Bracket ===
Semi-finals
22 March – Nanning
China	0
Wales	6
23 March – Nanning
Uruguay	2
Czech Republic	0

Final
26 March – Nanning
Wales	0
Uruguay	1
Third-place playoff
26 March – Nanning
China	1
Czech Republic	4

=== Semi-finals ===
22 March 2018
19:35

China	0–6	Wales
	Report	Bale 2', 21', 62'; Vokes 38', 58'; Wilson 45'

Guangxi Sports Center, Nanning
Attendance: 36,573
Referee: Amirul Izwan Yaacob (Malaysia)
23 March 2018
19:35

Uruguay	2–0	Czech Republic
Suárez 10' (pen.); Cavani 27'	Report

Guangxi Sports Center, Nanning
Attendance: 22,757
Referee: Saoud Ali Al-Adba (Qatar)

=== Third-place playoff ===
26 March 2018
15:35

China	1–4	Czech Republic
Fan Xiaodong 5'	Report	Kalas 58'; Schick 59'; Krmenčík 62'; Kadeřábek 78'

Guangxi Sports Center, Nanning
Attendance: 15,815
Referee: Chris Beath (Australia)

=== Final ===
26 March 2018
19:35

Wales	0–1	Uruguay
	Report	Cavani 49'

Guangxi Sports Center, Nanning
Attendance: 41,056
Referee: Salman Ahmad Falahi (Qatar)

== Goalscorers ==
There were 14 goals scored in 4 matches, for an average of 3.5 goals per match.

3 goals

- (Wales) Gareth Bale

2 goals

- (Uruguay) Edinson Cavani
- (Wales) Sam Vokes

1 goal

- (China) Fan Xiaodong
- (Czech Republic) Michael Krmenčík
- (Czech Republic) Patrik Schick
- (Czech Republic) Pavel Kadeřábek
- (Czech Republic) Tomáš Kalas
- (Uruguay) Luis Suárez
- (Wales) Harry Wilson
