= Zheng Tao =

Zheng Tao may refer to:

- Zheng Tao (swimmer), Chinese para swimmer
- Zheng Tao (footballer), Chinese footballer
