= Fan Xiaodong =

Chinese footballer (born 1987)

Fan Xiaodong 范晓冬
Personal information
- Full name: Fan Xiaodong
- Date of birth: 2 March 1987 (age 39)
- Place of birth: Zibo, Shandong, China
- Height: 1.78 m (5 ft 10 in)
- Positions: Midfielder; left-back

Youth career
- 2000–2004: Guangdong Mingfeng

Senior career*
Years	Team	Apps	(Gls)
2005–2008	Shenzhen Jianlibao	46	(2)
2009–2015	Hangzhou Greentown	147	(2)
2016–2020	Changchun Yatai	87	(8)
2021	Suzhou Dongwu	8	(0)
2022	Zibo Cuju		

International career^{‡}
2017–2018	China	8	(1)
Medal record
Representing China
Men's football
EAFF Championship
Bronze medal – third place	2017 Japan	Team
- * Club domestic league appearances and goals as of 20 December 2023 ‡ National team caps and goals as of 16 October 2018

Fan Xiaodong
- Simplified Chinese: 范晓冬
- Traditional Chinese: 范曉冬
Transcriptions
Standard Mandarin
- Hanyu Pinyin: Fàn Xiǎodōng
- IPA: [fân ɕjàʊ tʊ́ŋ]

Fan Xiaodong (Chinese: 范晓冬; pinyin: Fàn Xiǎodōng; born on March 2, 1987) is a Chinese former professional footballer who plays as a midfielder or left-back.

== Club career ==
=== Shenzhen Jianlibao ===
Fan Xiaodong started his professional football career when he joined Chinese Super League team Shenzhen Jianlibao in the 2005 league season. He would have to wait until the 2006 league season before he would make his league debut against Inter Xian on July 12, 2006, in a 2–2 draw, coming on as a second-half substitute. Gradually establishing himself throughout the season he would eventually play in 4 league games for Shenzhen, however it was in the 2007 Chinese Super League season that Fan Xiaodong establish himself as prominent member of the Shenzhen team by playing in 21 league games and help them avoid relegation. Being one of the few bright aspects in what was a disappointing season for Shenzhen, Fan Xiaodong was allowed to continue and develop for Shenzhen in the following season by playing in a further 21 league games whilst also scoring his first goal against Changchun Yatai on November 2, 2008, in a 4–2 defeat.

=== Hangzhou Greentown ===
Fan Xiaodong joined Hangzhou Greentown together with Zhang Ye at the beginning of the 2009 Chinese Super League season. He would make his debut against Qingdao Jonoon on March 22, 2009, in a 2–1 win in Hangzhou's first game of the season. Throughout the season Fan would be used as a squad player as the club struggled within the league and finished within the relegation zone, however they were given a reprieve along with Chongqing Lifan after it was discovered that Chengdu Blades and Guangzhou F.C. had fixed matches and were relegated instead as punishment. Fan would soon gain more playing time and score his first goal for his club on April 10, 2010, in a league game against Shanghai Shenhua where Hangzhou lost 2–1. By the end of the season Hangzhou came fourth within the league and qualified for the 2011 AFC Champions League for the first time where he played in all six games as they were knocked out in the group stages.

=== Changchun Yatai ===
On 5 January 2016, Fan moved to Chinese Super League side Changchun Yatai on a five-year contract. He made his debut for Changchun on 6 March 2016 in the first league match of the season against his former club Hangzhou Greentown. He scored his first goal for Changchun on 16 September 2016 in a 3–1 victory against Guangzhou R&F. Fan scored another goal on 16 October 2016 in a 2–1 win against Beijing Guoan. He scored two goals in all thirty matches in the 2016 season and secured Changchun's stay in the top flight for the next season.

== International career ==
On 10 January 2017, Fan made his debut for Chinese national team in the 2017 China Cup against Iceland. He scored his first international goal on 26 March 2018 in a 4–1 loss against Czech Republic in the third place match of 2018 China Cup.

== Career statistics ==
=== Club statistics ===
Statistics accurate as of match played 31 December 2020.

Appearances and goals by club, season and competition
Club	Season	League			National Cup		League Cup		Continental		Total	
Club	Season	Division	Apps	Goals	Apps	Goals	Apps	Goals	Apps	Goals	Apps	Goals
Shenzhen Jianlibao	2005	Chinese Super League	0	0	0	0	0	0	0	0	0	0
Shenzhen Jianlibao	2006	Chinese Super League	4	0	1	1	-		-		5	1
Shenzhen Jianlibao	2007	Chinese Super League	21	0	-		-		-		21	0
Shenzhen Jianlibao	2008	Chinese Super League	21	2	-		-		-		21	2
Shenzhen Jianlibao	Total		46	2	1	1	0	0	0	0	47	3
Hangzhou Greentown	2009	Chinese Super League	17	0	-		-		-		17	0
Hangzhou Greentown	2010	Chinese Super League	24	1	-		-		-		24	1
Hangzhou Greentown	2011	Chinese Super League	23	1	0	0	-		6	0	29	1
Hangzhou Greentown	2012	Chinese Super League	28	0	1	0	-		-		29	0
Hangzhou Greentown	2013	Chinese Super League	21	0	1	0	-		-		22	0
Hangzhou Greentown	2014	Chinese Super League	10	0	0	0	-		-		10	0
Hangzhou Greentown	2015	Chinese Super League	24	0	1	0	-		-		25	0
Hangzhou Greentown	Total		147	2	3	0	0	0	6	0	156	2
Changchun Yatai	2016	Chinese Super League	30	2	0	0	-		-		30	2
Changchun Yatai	2017	Chinese Super League	28	4	0	0	-		-		28	4
Changchun Yatai	2018	Chinese Super League	29	1	0	0	-		-		29	1
Changchun Yatai	2019	China League One	0	0	0	0	-		-		0	0
Changchun Yatai	Total		87	7	0	0	0	0	0	0	87	7
Career total			280	11	4	1	0	0	6	0	290	12

=== International statistics ===
National team
Year	Apps	Goals
2017	3	0
2018	5	1
Total	8	1

=== International goals ===
Scores and results list China's goal tally first.

No	Date	Venue	Opponent	Score	Result	Competition
1.	26 March 2018	Guangxi Sports Center, Nanning, China	Czech Republic	1–0	1–4	2018 China Cup
