= 2017 China Cup =

中国杯国际足球锦标赛

Tournament details
- Host country: China
- Dates: 10–15 January
- Teams: 4 (from 3 confederations)
- Venue: 1 (in 1 host city)

Final positions
- Champions: Chile (1st title)
- Runners-up: Iceland
- Third place: China
- Fourth place: Croatia

Tournament statistics
- Matches played: 4
- Goals scored: 7 (1.75 per match)
- Attendance: 82,473 (20,618 per match)
- Top scorer(s): Seven players (1 goal each)
- Best player: (Chile) Eduardo Vargas

The 2017 Gree China Cup International Football Championship (Chinese: 2017年格力中国杯国际足球锦标赛) was the inaugural edition of the China Cup, an international football tournament. It was held from 10 to 15 January 2017 in Nanning, Guangxi, China.

The tournament was hosted by the Chinese Football Association, Wanda Sports Holdings, Guangxi Zhuang Autonomous Region Sports Bureau and the Nanning Municipal Government, and sponsored by Gree Electric.

== Participants ==
In November 2016, the participants were announced.

Team	FIFA Ranking (December 2016)
Chile	4
Croatia	14
Iceland	21
China (host)	82

== Venue ==
Nanning	Location of the host city of the 2017 China Cup.
Guangxi Sports Center	Location of the host city of the 2017 China Cup.
22.767°N 108.388°E	Location of the host city of the 2017 China Cup.
Capacity: 60,000	Location of the host city of the 2017 China Cup.

== Match officials ==
The following referees were chosen for the 2017 China Cup.

Referees

- (China) Fu Ming
- (China) Ma Ning
- (South Korea) Kim Jong-hyeok
- (South Korea) Ko Hyung-jin

Assistant referees

- (China) Cao Yi
- (China) Ma Ji
- (South Korea) Kim Young-ha
- (South Korea) Yoon Kwang-yeol

== Squads ==
Age, caps and goals as of the start of the tournament, 10 January 2017.

=== China ===
China

Coach: (Italy) Marcello Lippi

No.	Pos.	Player	Date of birth (age)	Caps	Goals	Club
1	GK	Shi Xiaotian	6 March 1990 (aged 26)	0	0	(Chinese Football Association) Liaoning FC
2	DF	Bai Jiajun	20 March 1991 (aged 25)	0	0	(Chinese Football Association) Shanghai Shenhua
3	DF	Pei Shuai	14 January 1993 (aged 23)	0	0	(Chinese Football Association) Changchun Yatai
4	MF	Fan Xiaodong	2 March 1987 (aged 29)	0	0	(Chinese Football Association) Changchun Yatai
5	DF	Yang Shanping	28 October 1987 (aged 29)	1	0	(Chinese Football Association) Tianjin Quanjian
6	DF	Gao Zhunyi	21 August 1995 (aged 21)	0	0	(Chinese Football Association) Hebei China Fortune
7	FW	Wang Jingbin	9 May 1995 (aged 21)	0	0	(Japan Football Association) Fagiano Okayama
8	MF	Cai Huikang	10 October 1989 (aged 27)	18	0	(Chinese Football Association) Shanghai SIPG
9	FW	Mao Jianqing	8 August 1986 (aged 30)	9	2	(Chinese Football Association) Shanghai Shenhua
10	MF	Hu Rentian	21 January 1991 (aged 25)	1	1	(Chinese Football Association) Tianjin Teda
11	MF	Yin Hongbo	30 October 1989 (aged 27)	0	0	(Chinese Football Association) Henan Jianye
12	GK	Zou Dehai	27 February 1993 (aged 23)	0	0	(Chinese Football Association) Hangzhou Greentown
13	DF	Deng Hanwen	8 January 1995 (aged 22)	0	0	(Chinese Football Association) Nei Mongol Zhongyou
14	MF	Feng Gang	6 March 1993 (aged 23)	0	0	(Chinese Football Association) Hangzhou Greentown
15	MF	Chi Zhongguo	26 October 1989 (aged 27)	0	0	(Chinese Football Association) Yanbian Funde
17	MF	Cui Min	6 July 1989 (aged 27)	0	0	(Chinese Football Association) Yanbian Funde
18	MF	Chen Zhongliu	30 September 1993 (aged 23)	0	0	(Chinese Football Association) Hangzhou Greentown
19	MF	Cao Yunding	22 November 1989 (aged 27)	1	0	(Chinese Football Association) Shanghai Shenhua
20	MF	Wang Jinxian	12 January 1996 (aged 20)	0	0	(Chinese Football Association) Dalian Yifang
21	MF	Hui Jiakang	15 January 1989 (aged 27)	1	0	(Chinese Football Association) Tianjin Teda
22	GK	Chi Wenyi	18 February 1988 (aged 28)	0	0	(Chinese Football Association) Yanbian Funde
23	DF	Fu Huan	12 July 1993 (aged 23)	0	0	(Chinese Football Association) Shanghai SIPG

=== Chile ===
Chile

Coach: (Argentina) Juan Antonio Pizzi

No.	Pos.	Player	Date of birth (age)	Caps	Goals	Club
1	GK	Cristopher Toselli	15 June 1988 (aged 28)	7	0	(Football Federation of Chile) Universidad Católica
2	DF	Cristián Cuevas	2 April 1995 (aged 21)	0	0	(Royal Belgian Football Association) Sint-Truiden
3	DF	Óscar Opazo	18 October 1990 (aged 26)	0	0	(Football Federation of Chile) Santiago Wanderers
4	DF	Branco Ampuero	19 July 1993 (aged 23)	0	0	(Football Federation of Chile) Deportes Antofagasta
5	DF	Paulo Díaz	24 March 1994 (aged 22)	1	0	(Argentine Football Association) San Lorenzo
6	FW	José Pedro Fuenzalida	22 February 1985 (aged 31)	38	3	(Football Federation of Chile) Universidad Católica
7	FW	Leonardo Valencia	25 April 1991 (aged 25)	2	0	(Football Federation of Chile) Palestino
8	MF	Carlos Carmona	21 February 1987 (aged 29)	48	1	(Italian Football Federation) Atalanta
9	FW	Ángelo Sagal	18 April 1993 (aged 23)	1	0	(Football Federation of Chile) Huachipato
10	FW	Júnior Fernándes	4 October 1988 (aged 28)	10	0	(Croatian Football Federation) Dinamo Zagreb
11	FW	Eduardo Vargas	20 November 1989 (aged 27)	66	32	(German Football Association) 1899 Hoffenheim
12	GK	Gabriel Castellón	8 September 1993 (aged 23)	0	0	(Football Federation of Chile) Santiago Wanderers
13	MF	Pablo Galdames	30 December 1996 (aged 20)	0	0	(Football Federation of Chile) Unión Española
14	MF	Esteban Pavez	1 May 1990 (aged 26)	1	0	(Football Federation of Chile) Colo-Colo
15	DF	Jean Beausejour	1 June 1984 (aged 32)	85	6	(Football Federation of Chile) Universidad de Chile
17	MF	Rafael Caroca	19 July 1989 (aged 27)	2	0	(Football Federation of Chile) Deportes Iquique
18	DF	Sebastián Vegas	4 December 1996 (aged 20)	1	0	(Mexican Football Federation) Monarcas Morelia
19	FW	Álvaro Ramos	14 April 1992 (aged 24)	0	0	(Football Federation of Chile) Deportes Iquique
20	DF	Guillermo Maripán	6 May 1994 (aged 22)	0	0	(Football Federation of Chile) Universidad Católica
21	MF	César Pinares	23 May 1991 (aged 25)	0	0	(Football Federation of Chile) Unión Española
22	FW	Ángelo Henríquez	13 April 1994 (aged 22)	9	2	(Croatian Football Federation) Dinamo Zagreb
23	GK	Darío Melo	24 March 1994 (aged 22)	0	0	(Football Federation of Chile) Palestino

=== Croatia ===
Croatia

Coach: (Croatia) Ante Čačić

No.	Pos.	Player	Date of birth (age)	Caps	Goals	Club
1	GK	Dominik Livaković	9 January 1995 (aged 22)	0	0	(Croatian Football Federation) Dinamo Zagreb
2	DF	Matej Mitrović	10 November 1993 (aged 23)	4	1	(Croatian Football Federation) Rijeka
3	DF	Borna Barišić	10 November 1992 (aged 24)	0	0	(Croatian Football Federation) Osijek
4	DF	Toni Datković	6 November 1993 (aged 23)	0	0	(Football Association of Slovenia) Koper
5	DF	Mateo Barać	20 July 1994 (aged 22)	0	0	(Croatian Football Federation) Osijek
6	DF	Nikola Matas	22 June 1987 (aged 29)	0	0	(Croatian Football Federation) Osijek
7	MF	Mario Šitum	4 April 1992 (aged 24)	0	0	(Croatian Football Federation) Dinamo Zagreb
8	MF	Domagoj Antolić	30 June 1990 (aged 26)	4	0	(Croatian Football Federation) Dinamo Zagreb
9	FW	Mirko Marić	16 May 1995 (aged 21)	0	0	(Croatian Football Federation) Lokomotiva
10	MF	Franko Andrijašević	22 June 1991 (aged 25)	1	0	(Croatian Football Federation) Rijeka
11	FW	Antonio Perošević	6 March 1992 (aged 24)	0	0	(Croatian Football Federation) Osijek
12	GK	Andrej Prskalo	1 May 1987 (aged 29)	0	0	(Croatian Football Federation) Rijeka
13	DF	Jakov Filipović	17 October 1992 (aged 24)	0	0	(Croatian Football Federation) Inter Zaprešić
14	MF	Luka Ivanušec	26 November 1998 (aged 18)	0	0	(Croatian Football Federation) Lokomotiva
15	MF	Josip Mišić	28 June 1994 (aged 22)	0	0	(Croatian Football Federation) Rijeka
16	MF	Fran Tudor	27 September 1995 (aged 21)	0	0	(Croatian Football Federation) Hajduk Split
17	DF	Josip Juranović	16 August 1995 (aged 21)	0	0	(Croatian Football Federation) Hajduk Split
18	MF	Filip Ozobić	8 April 1991 (aged 25)	0	0	(Association of Football Federations of Azerbaijan) Gabala
19	DF	Josip Pivarić	30 January 1989 (aged 27)	9	0	(Croatian Football Federation) Dinamo Zagreb

=== Iceland ===
Iceland

Coach: (Iceland) Heimir Hallgrímsson

No.	Pos.	Player	Date of birth (age)	Caps	Goals	Club
1	GK	Hannes Þór Halldórsson	27 April 1984 (aged 32)	40	0	(Danish Football Association) Randers
2	DF	Birkir Már Sævarsson	11 November 1984 (aged 32)	65	1	(Swedish Football Association) Hammarby IF
3	DF	Kristinn Jónsson	4 August 1990 (aged 26)	5	0	(Norwegian Football Federation) Sarpsborg 08
4	DF	Orri Sigurður Ómarsson	18 February 1995 (aged 21)	0	0	(Football Association of Iceland) Valur
5	DF	Jón Guðni Fjóluson	10 April 1989 (aged 27)	8	0	(Swedish Football Association) IFK Norrköping
6	MF	Victor Pálsson	30 April 1991 (aged 25)	4	0	(Danish Football Association) Esbjerg
7	MF	Aron Sigurðarson	8 October 1993 (aged 23)	1	0	(Norwegian Football Federation) Tromsø
8	FW	Björn Bergmann Sigurðarson	26 February 1991 (aged 25)	3	0	(Norwegian Football Federation) Molde
9	FW	Kjartan Finnbogason	9 July 1986 (aged 30)	4	0	(Danish Football Association) Horsens
10	MF	Björn Daníel Sverrisson	29 May 1990 (aged 26)	6	0	(Norwegian Football Federation) AGF
11	MF	Arnór Smárason	7 September 1988 (aged 28)	19	2	(Swedish Football Association) Hammarby IF
12	GK	Ögmundur Kristinsson	19 June 1989 (aged 27)	12	0	(Swedish Football Association) Hammarby IF
13	GK	Rúnar Alex Rúnarsson	18 February 1995 (aged 21)	0	0	(Danish Football Association) Nordsjælland
14	DF	Kári Árnason	13 October 1982 (aged 34)	55	3	(Swedish Football Association) Malmö FF
15	DF	Viðar Ari Jónsson	10 March 1994 (aged 22)	0	0	(Football Association of Iceland) Fjölnir
16	MF	Oliver Sigurjónsson	5 May 1995 (aged 21)	1	0	(Football Association of Iceland) Breiðablik
17	MF	Óttar Magnús Karlsson	21 February 1997 (aged 19)	0	0	(Norwegian Football Federation) Molde
18	MF	Theódór Elmar Bjarnason	4 March 1987 (aged 29)	32	0	(Danish Football Association) AGF
19	MF	Sigurður Egill Lárusson	22 January 1992 (aged 24)	0	0	(Football Association of Iceland) Valur
20	DF	Böðvar Böðvarsson	9 April 1995 (aged 21)	0	0	(Danish Football Association) Midtjylland
21	FW	Albert Guðmundsson	15 June 1997 (aged 19)	0	0	(Royal Dutch Football Association) Jong PSV
22	FW	Elías Már Ómarsson	18 January 1995 (aged 21)	5	0	(Swedish Football Association) IFK Göteborg

== Matches ==
The official draw was announced on 7 December 2016. All times are local, CST (UTC+8).

=== Bracket ===
Semi-finals
10 January – Nanning
China	0
Iceland	2
11 January – Nanning
Chile (p)	1 (4)
Croatia	1 (1)

Final
15 January – Nanning
Iceland	0
Chile	1
Third place
14 January – Nanning
China (p)	1 (4)
Croatia	1 (3)

=== Semi-finals ===
10 January 2017
20:00

China	0–2	Iceland
	Report	Finnbogason 64'; Sigurðarson 88'

Guangxi Sports Center, Nanning
Attendance: 23,876
Referee: Kim Jong-hyeok (South Korea)

China PR	Iceland

11 January 2017
19:35

Chile	1–1	Croatia
Pinares 18'	Report	Andrijašević 76'
Penalties
Vargas (penalty scored); Galdames (penalty scored); Beausejour (penalty scored); Ramos (penalty scored)	4–1	(penalty scored) Pivarić; (penalty missed) Antolić; (penalty missed) Marić

Guangxi Sports Center, Nanning
Attendance: 6,686
Referee: Fu Ming (China)

Chile	Croatia

=== Third-place playoff ===
14 January 2017
15:35

China	1–1	Croatia
Wang Jingbin 89'	Report	Ivanušec 36'
Penalties
Yin Hongbo (penalty scored); Chi Zhongguo (penalty scored); Fan Xiaodong (penalty missed); Wang Jingbin (penalty scored); Wang Jinxian (penalty scored)	4–3	(penalty scored) Pivarić; (penalty scored) Ozobić; (penalty missed) Perošević; (penalty scored) Juranović; (penalty missed) Mišić

Guangxi Sports Center, Nanning
Attendance: 25,576
Referee: Ko Hyung-jin (South Korea)

China PR	Croatia

=== Final ===
15 January 2017
15:35

Iceland	0–1	Chile
	Report	Sagal 18'

Guangxi Sports Center, Nanning
Attendance: 26,335
Referee: Ma Ning (China)

Iceland	Chile

== Goalscorers ==
There were 7 goals scored in 4 matches, for an average of 1.75 goals per match.

1 goal

- (China) Wang Jingbin
- (Chile) César Pinares
- (Chile) Ángelo Sagal
- (Croatia) Franko Andrijašević
- (Croatia) Luka Ivanušec
- (Iceland) Aron Sigurðarson
- (Iceland) Kjartan Finnbogason
