= Gabriel Castellón =

Chilean footballer (born 1993)

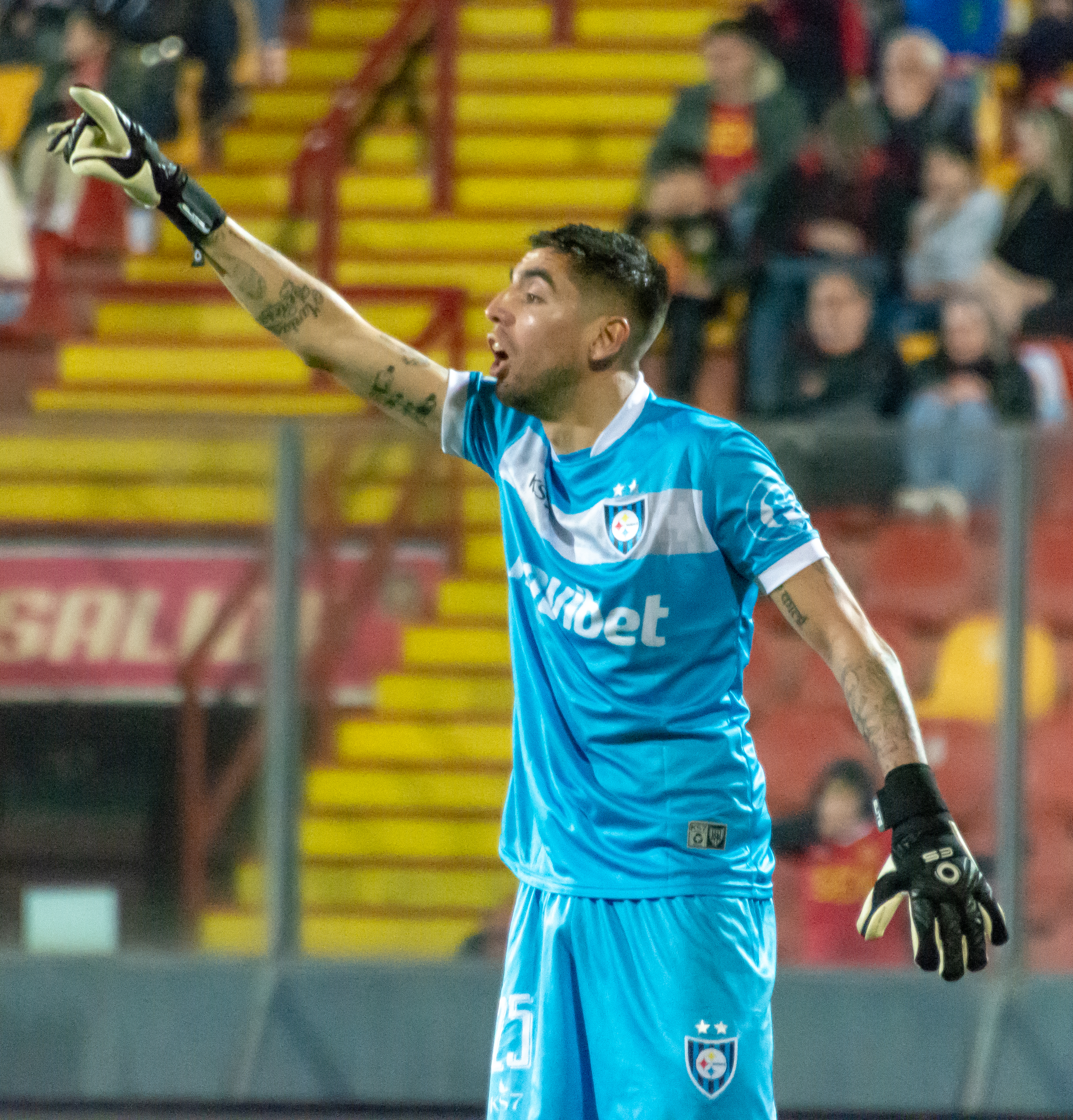

Personal information
- Full name: Gabriel Jesús Castellón Velazquez
- Date of birth: 8 September 1993 (age 33)
- Place of birth: Valparaiso, Chile
- Height: 1.92 m (6 ft 4 in)
- Position: Goalkeeper

Team information
- Current team: Universidad de Chile
- Number: 25

Youth career
- 2001–2013: Santiago Wanderers

Senior career*
| Years | Team | Apps | (Gls) |
| 2013–2018 | Santiago Wanderers | 62 | (0) |
| 2012 | → Colchagua (loan) | 1 | (0) |
| 2019–2023 | Huachipato | 111 | (0) |
| 2024– | Universidad de Chile | 43 | (0) |

International career^{‡}
| 2017– | Chile | 0 | (0) |
- * Club domestic league appearances and goals as of 12 July 2025 ‡ National team caps and goals as of 05:40, 19 June 2021 (UTC)

Gabriel Jesús Castellón Velazquez (Spanish pronunciation: [ɡaˈβɾjel kasteˈʝon]; born 8 September 1993) is a Chilean footballer who currently plays as a goalkeeper for Universidad de Chile of the Chilean Primera División.

== International career ==
Castellón was called up for Chile's 2017 China Cup squad, which Chile won. He was later called up for a friendly match against Bolivia on March 26, 2021. Castellón was also called up to Chile's squad for the 2022 FIFA World Cup qualifiers against Argentina and Bolivia on 3 and 8 June 2021 respectively, but did not make his debut.

== Career statistics ==
As of 16 July 2025.

Appearances and goals by club, season and competition
| Club | Season | League | | | Cup | | Continental | | Other | | Total | |
| Club | Season | Division | Apps | Goals | Apps | Goals | Apps | Goals | Apps | Goals | Apps | Goals |
|---|---|---|---|---|---|---|---|---|---|---|---|---|
| Santiago Wanderers | 2013–14 | Chilean Primera División | 6 | 0 | 0 | 0 | — | | — | | 6 | 0 |
| Santiago Wanderers | 2014–15 | Chilean Primera División | 8 | 0 | 3 | 0 | — | | — | | 11 | 0 |
| Santiago Wanderers | 2015–16 | Chilean Primera División | 7 | 0 | 4 | 0 | 2 | 0 | — | | 13 | 0 |
| Santiago Wanderers | 2016–17 | Chilean Primera División | 26 | 0 | — | | — | | — | | 26 | 0 |
| Santiago Wanderers | 2017 | Chilean Primera División | 15 | 0 | 8 | 0 | — | | 2 | 0 | 25 | 0 |
| Santiago Wanderers | 2018 | Primera B de Chile | 0 | 0 | 2 | 0 | 0 | 0 | 1 | 0 | 3 | 0 |
| Santiago Wanderers | Total | | 62 | 0 | 17 | 0 | 2 | 0 | 3 | 0 | 84 | 0 |
| Huachipato | 2019 | Chilean Primera División | 12 | 0 | 2 | 0 | — | | — | | 14 | 0 |
| Huachipato | 2020 | Chilean Primera División | 24 | 0 | — | | 2 | 0 | — | | 26 | 0 |
| Huachipato | 2021 | Chilean Primera División | 25 | 0 | 0 | 0 | 7 | 0 | 2 | 0 | 34 | 0 |
| Huachipato | 2022 | Chilean Primera División | 30 | 0 | 3 | 0 | — | | — | | 33 | 0 |
| Huachipato | 2023 | Chilean Primera División | 29 | 0 | 1 | 0 | — | | — | | 30 | 0 |
| Huachipato | Total | | 120 | 0 | 6 | 0 | 9 | 0 | 2 | 0 | 137 | 0 |
| Universidad de Chile | 2024 | Chilean Primera División | 30 | 0 | 5 | 0 | — | | — | | 35 | 0 |
| Universidad de Chile | 2025 | Chilean Primera División | 13 | 0 | 2 | 0 | 7 | 0 | — | | 22 | 0 |
| Universidad de Chile | Total | | 43 | 0 | 7 | 0 | 7 | 0 | — | | 57 | 0 |
| Career total | | | 225 | 0 | 30 | 0 | 18 | 0 | 5 | 0 | 278 | 0 |

== Honours ==
=== Club ===
Santiago Wanderers

- Copa Chile (1): 2017

=== International ===
Chile

- China Cup (1): 2017
