= Ángelo Sagal =

Chilean footballer (born 1993)

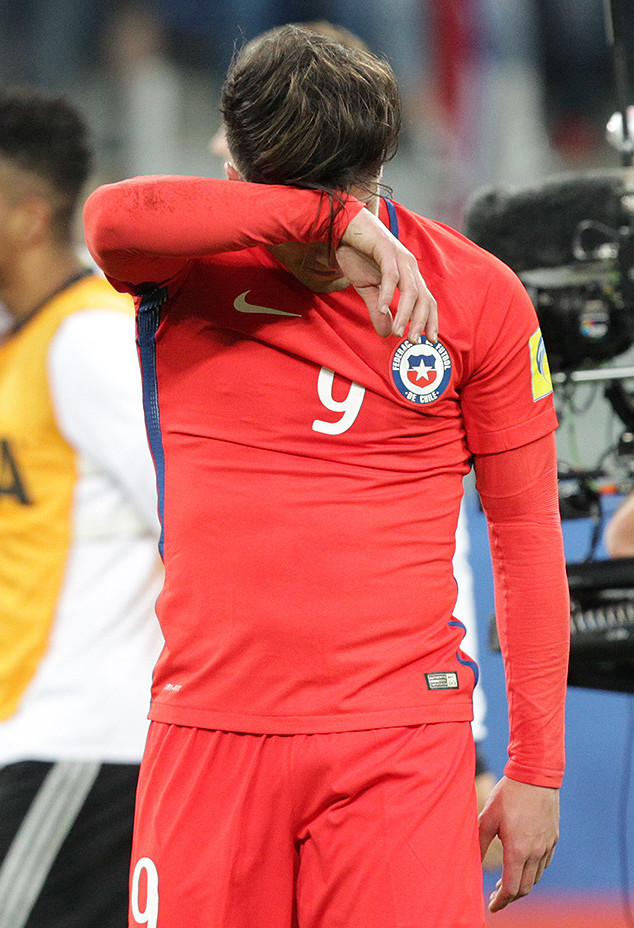
- Sagal with Chile at the 2017 FIFA Confederations Cup

Personal information
- Full name: Ángelo Nicolás Sagal Tapia
- Date of birth: 18 April 1993 (age 33)
- Place of birth: Talca, Chile
- Height: 1.82 m (6 ft 0 in)
- Positions: Winger; forward

Team information
- Current team: A.E. Kifisia
- Number: 28

Youth career
- Unión Independencia
- 2008–2012: Rangers

Senior career*
Years	Team	Apps	(Gls)
2012–2013	Rangers	27	(0)
2013–2017	Huachipato	82	(16)
2017–2020	Pachuca	61	(11)
2019–2020	→ Juárez (loan)	24	(3)
2020–2021	Denizlispor	35	(1)
2021–2023	Gaziantep	45	(5)
2023	→ Ferencváros (loan)	7	(0)
2023–2025	Apollon Limassol	44	(9)
2025–2026	AEL	28	(6)
2026–	A.E. Kifisia	10	(4)

International career^{‡}
2015–2019	Chile	18	(2)
Medal record
Representing Chile
Runner-up	FIFA Confederations Cup	2017
Winner	China Cup	2017
- * Club domestic league appearances and goals as of 7 November 2026 ‡ National team caps and goals as of 4 July 2019

Ángelo Nicolás Sagal Tapia (Spanish pronunciation: [ˈaɲɟʝelo saˈɣal]; born 18 April 1993) is a Chilean professional footballer who plays as a forward for Greek Super League club A.E. Kifisia.

== Career ==
=== Early career ===
Born in Talca, Chile, Sagal started playing football for club Unión Independiencia in his neighborhood. After a trial with Colo-Colo, he joined the Rangers de Talca youth ranks.

=== Ferencváros ===
On 5 May 2023, he won the 2022–23 Nemzeti Bajnokság I with Ferencváros, after Kecskemét lost 1–0 to Honvéd at the Bozsik Aréna on the 30th matchday.

=== Apollon Limassol ===
After playing for Ferencváros and ending his contract with the Turkish club Gaziantep, he joined Apollon Limassol in the Cypriot First Division.

=== AEL ===
On 11 August 2025, Sagal signed with Greek club AEL on a deal for a season.

=== Kifisia ===
On 25 July 2026, Sagal signed with Kifisia.

== International career ==
He got his first call up to the senior Chile squad for a friendly against the United States in January 2015 and made his international debut in the match. At 2017 China Cup, he scored his first international match goal, which made La Roja win the cup.

=== International goals ===
Scores and results list Chile's goal tally first.

No	Date	Venue	Opponent	Score	Result	Competition
1.	15 January 2017	Guangxi Sports Center, Nanning, China	Iceland	1–0	1–0	2017 China Cup
2.	2 June 2017	Estadio Nacional, Santiago, Chile	Burkina Faso	3–0	3–0	International Friendly

== Personal life ==
His younger brother, Bastián, is a footballer who was with the Mexican clubs Tlaxcala and Pachuca before joining Ñublense in 2022.

Sagal is the cousin of the former professional footballer Nino Rojas and the nephew of Bernardino "Loco Nino" Rojas, father of Nino, a well-known footballer in his city of birth, Talca.

== Honours ==
Huachipato

- Copa Chile runner-up: 2013–14

Pachuca

- FIFA Club World Cup third place: 2017

Chile

- China Cup: 2017
