= Chilean Footballer of the Year =

Men's football award

Chilean Footballer of the Year is an award that the Circulo de Periodistas de Chile annually grants, to those Chilean soccer players who during the season of Primera División de Chile have obtained the greater number of points, in agreement with the opinion of the editors of the agency.

== Chilean Footballer of the Year ==
2025	(Chile) Erick Pulgar	(Brazil) Flamengo
2024	(Argentina) Fernando Zampedri	Universidad Católica
2023	(Chile) Diego Valdés	(Mexico) Club América
2022	(Chile) Ben Brereton	(England) Blackburn Rovers
2021	(Chile) Luis Jiménez	CD Palestino
2020	–	–
2019	(Chile) José Pedro Fuenzalida	Universidad Católica
2018	(Chile) Esteban Paredes	Colo-Colo
2017	(Chile) Jaime Valdés	Colo-Colo
2016	(Chile) Arturo Vidal	(Germany) Bayern München
2015	(Chile) Claudio Bravo	(Spain) Barcelona
2014	(Chile) Jaime Valdés	Colo-Colo
2013	(Chile) Cristopher Toselli	Universidad Católica
2012	(Chile) Charles Aránguiz	Universidad de Chile
2011	(Chile) Eduardo Vargas	Universidad de Chile
2010	(Chile) Rodrigo Millar	Colo-Colo
2009	(Chile) Claudio Bravo	(Spain) Real Sociedad
2008	(Chile) Gary Medel	Universidad Católica
2007	(Chile) Carlos Villanueva	Audax Italiano
2006	(Chile) Matías Fernández	Colo-Colo
2005	(Chile) José Luis Sierra	Unión Española
2004	(Chile) Luis Fuentes	Cobreloa
2003	(Chile) Rodrigo Meléndez	Cobreloa
2002	(Chile) Miguel Ramírez	Universidad Católica
2001	(Chile) Jaime Riveros	Santiago Wanderers
2000	(Chile) (Argentina) Sergio Vargas	Universidad de Chile
1999	(Chile) Pedro González	Universidad de Chile
1998	(Chile) Marcelo Salas	(Italy) Lazio
1997	(Chile) Marcelo Salas	(Argentina) River Plate
1996	(Chile) Sebastián Rozental	Universidad Católica
1995	(Argentina) Cristian Traverso	Universidad de Chile
1994	(Argentina) Alberto Acosta	Universidad Católica
1993	(Chile) Jorge Contreras	Colo-Colo
1992	(Chile) Juan Covarrubias	Cobreloa
1991	(Chile) Mario Osbén	Cobreloa
1990	(Chile) Iván Zamorano	Cobresal
1989	(Chile) Héctor Hoffens	Universidad de Chile
1988	(Chile) Jaime Pizarro	Colo-Colo
1987	(Chile) Jaime Pizarro	Colo-Colo
1986	(Chile) (Argentina) Oscar Fabbiani	CD Palestino
1985	(Chile) Rafael González	Colo-Colo
1984	(Chile) Lizardo Garrido	Colo-Colo
1983	(Chile) Miguel Ángel Neira	Universidad Católica
1982	(Chile) Mario Soto	Cobreloa

== Statistics by Club ==
- Colo-Colo: 15 times
- Universidad de Chile: 11 times
- Universidad Católica: 10 times
- Unión Española: 5 times
- Cobreloa: 4 times
- Palestino: 3 times
- Audax Italiano: 2 times
- Cobresal, Santiago Wanderers, Unión San Felipe, Ferrobádminton, Deportes Concepción, Santiago Morning, Everton, San Marcos de Arica, Fort Lauderdale Strikers, FC St. Gallen, River Plate, Quilmes, Real Sociedad, FC Barcelona, Bayern Munich, Blackburn Rovers, Club América, Flamengo: 1 time

== See also ==
- Player of the Year of Argentina
- Paraguayan Footballer of the Year
- Footballer of the Year (disambiguation)
