= Massimiliano Scaglia =

Italian footballer

Personal information
- Date of birth: 21 May 1977 (age 49)
- Place of birth: Turin, Italy
- Height: 1.82 m (6 ft 0 in)
- Position: Defender

Senior career*
Years	Team	Apps	(Gls)
1995–2002	Alessandria	155	(8)
2002–2003	Ancona	3	(0)
2003–2004	Fiorentina	32	(1)
2004–2007	Bari	77	(6)
2007–2009	Treviso	56	(4)
2009–2010	Gallipoli	36	(5)
2010–2012	Hellas Verona	59	(1)
2012–2016	Pro Vercelli	110	(5)
- * Club domestic league appearances and goals

Massimiliano Scaglia (born 21 May 1977) is an Italian former professional footballer who played as a defender.

== Career ==
Scaglia started his professional football career as an 18-year-old with Salernitana. Failing to break into the first team, he joined U.S. Alessandria Calcio 1912, spending seven seasons with them before moving to Serie B side A.C. Ancona. He had limited game time with Ancona, so returned to Serie C1 with ACF Fiorentina in January 2003, helping them to promotion that season. He then joined A.S. Bari as part of Jaime Valdés's deal.

Scaglia moved to Treviso in the summer of 2007. He joined Gallipoli in August 2009 on a free transfer.

Scaglia represented Padania at the 2008 Viva World Cup. In July 2010, he was signed by Verona.

== Personal life ==
Massimiliano is the brother of Valentina Scaglia, a professional ballet dancer based in the Netherlands.
