= Kevin Vásquez =

Chilean footballer (born 1997)

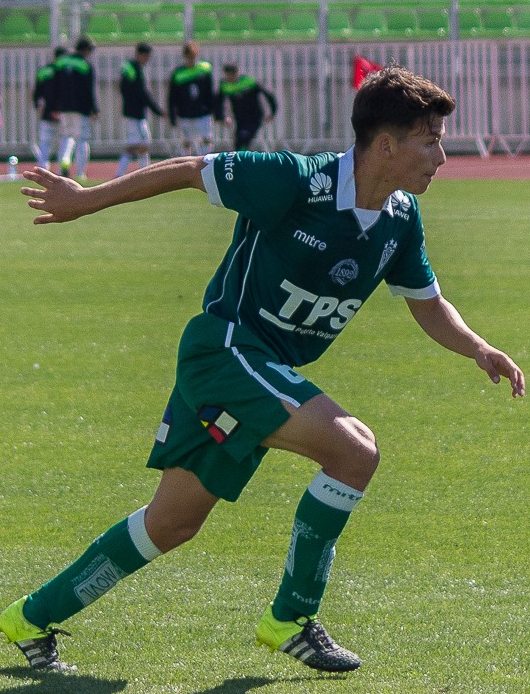
- Vásquez with Santiago Wanderers in 2016

Personal information
- Full name: Kevin Alexander Vásquez Saldivia
- Date of birth: 27 June 1997 (age 29)
- Place of birth: Valparaíso, Chile
- Height: 1.70 m (5 ft 7 in)
- Position: Midfielder

Team information
- Current team: Rangers
- Number: 3

Youth career
- Santiago Wanderers

Senior career*
Years	Team	Apps	(Gls)
2016–2020	Santiago Wanderers	9	(0)
2017	→ Unión La Calera (loan)	14	(0)
2019	→ Unión La Calera (loan)	3	(0)
2020	→ Magallanes (loan)	21	(0)
2021–2022	Santiago Morning	56	(2)
2023–2024	Santiago Wanderers	30	(0)
2025	Santiago Morning	26	(2)
2026–	Rangers	0	(0)

International career^{‡}
2015–2017	Chile U20	1	(0)
- * Club domestic league appearances and goals as of 14 December 2025 ‡ National team caps and goals as of 20 May 2017

Kevin Alexander Vásquez Saldivia (born 27 June 1997) is a Chilean football player who plays as midfielder for Rangers de Talca.

== Club career ==
In 2025, Vásquez played for Santiago Morning. The next year, he switched to Rangers de Talca.

== International career ==
Along with Chile U20, he won the L'Alcúdia Tournament in 2015.

== Honours ==
Chile U20

- L'Alcúdia International Tournament (1): 2015
