= Zhang Ye (footballer, born 1987) =

Chinese footballer

Zhang Ye 张野
Personal information
- Full name: Zhang Ye
- Date of birth: 26 April 1987 (age 39)
- Place of birth: Shenyang, China
- Height: 1.86 m (6 ft 1 in)
- Position: Midfielder

Youth career
- 2000–2004: Guangdong Mingfeng

Senior career*
Years	Team	Apps	(Gls)
2005–2008	Shenzhen Jianlibao	73	(9)
2009–2010	Hangzhou Greentown	20	(1)
2010–2019	Liaoning Whowin	184	(11)
2020–2021	Jiangxi Beidamen	37	(0)
2022	Zibo Cuju	27	(1)
- * Club domestic league appearances and goals as of 27 April 2022

Zhang Ye (simplified Chinese: 张野; traditional Chinese: 張野; pinyin: Zhāng Yě; born on April 26, 1987, in China) is a Chinese retired footballer who played as a midfielder.

== Club career ==
=== Shenzhen Jianlibao ===
Zhang Ye would move to Chinese Super League football team Shenzhen Jianlibao to start his professional football career in 2005. He was to make his league debut on March 19, 2006, starting a game against Inter Xian in a 0–0 draw. Quickly establishing himself within the team he would go on to score his first and second goals against Shenyang Ginde in a 2–1 victory on August 9, 2006. By the following season Zhang Ye would become an integral member of the team and was one of the few bright aspects in a disappointing season, which also saw him achieve his first red card on the debut game of the season on March 3, 2007, against Shaanxi Baorong.

=== Hangzhou Greentown ===
Zhang Ye together with Fan Xiaodong would both join Hangzhou Greentown at the beginning of the 2009 Chinese Super League season. Zhang Ye would make his debut for the team in their first game of the season against Qingdao Jonoon on March 22 in 2–1 win.

On 21 May 2026, Zhang was given a 5-year ban for match-fixing by the Chinese Football Association.

== Career statistics ==
Statistics accurate as of match played 31 December 2020.

Club	Season	League			National Cup		League Cup		Other		Total	
Club	Season	Division	Apps	Goals	Apps	Goals	Apps	Goals	Apps	Goals	Apps	Goals
Shenzhen Jianlibao	2005	Chinese Super League	0	0	0	0	0	0	0	0	0	0
Shenzhen Jianlibao	2006	Chinese Super League	18	4			-		-		14	4
Shenzhen Jianlibao	2007	Chinese Super League	26	4	-		-		-		26	4
Shenzhen Jianlibao	2008	Chinese Super League	29	1	-		-		-		29	1
Shenzhen Jianlibao	Total		73	9	0	0	0	0	0	0	73	0
Hangzhou Greentown	2009	Chinese Super League	17	1	-		-		-		17	1
Hangzhou Greentown	2010	Chinese Super League	3	0	-		-		-		3	0
Hangzhou Greentown	Total		20	1	0	0	0	0	0	0	20	1
Liaoning Whowin	2010	Chinese Super League	11	0	-		-		-		11	0
Liaoning Whowin	2011	Chinese Super League	15	1	2	0	-		-		17	1
Liaoning Whowin	2012	Chinese Super League	20	1	3	0	-		-		23	1
Liaoning Whowin	2013	Chinese Super League	21	0	0	0	-		-		21	0
Liaoning Whowin	2014	Chinese Super League	28	2	1	0	-		-		29	2
Liaoning Whowin	2015	Chinese Super League	23	3	1	0	-		-		24	3
Liaoning Whowin	2016	Chinese Super League	19	2	1	0	-		-		20	2
Liaoning Whowin	2017	Chinese Super League	25	1	0	0	-		-		25	1
Liaoning Whowin	2018	China League One	25	2	0	0	-		-		25	2
Liaoning Whowin	2019	China League One	3	0	0	0	-		-		3	0
Liaoning Whowin	Total		190	12	8	0	0	0	0	0	198	12
Jiangxi Liansheng	2020	China League One	13	0	-		-		2 (Note: Appearances in China League One relegation play-offs)	0	15	0
Career total			296	22	8	0	0	0	2	0	306	22
