= 2014 in Chilean football =

Football in Chile
- Season: 2014

This article covers the 2014 football season in Chile.

== National tournaments ==
=== Primera División ===
- Clausura Champion: Colo-Colo
  - Topscorer: Esteban Paredes
- Apertura Champion: Club Universidad de Chile
  - Topscorer: Esteban Paredes

=== Copa Chile ===
- Champion: Deportes Iquique
  - Topscorer: Rodrigo Díaz

== National team results ==
The Chile national football team results and fixtures for 2014.

Win Draw Loss

=== 2014 FIFA World Cup ===
June 13 2014 FIFA World Cup	Chile	3–1	Australia	Cuiabá, Brazil
18:00 (UTC−4)	Sánchez 12'; Valdivia 14'; Beausejour 90+2'	Report	Cahill 35'	Stadium: Arena Pantanal; Attendance: 40,275; Referee: Noumandiez Doué (Ivory Coast)

June 18 2014 FIFA World Cup	Spain	0–2	Chile	Rio de Janeiro, Brazil
16:00 (UTC−3)		Report	Vargas 20'; Aránguiz 43'	Stadium: Estádio do Maracanã; Attendance: 74,101; Referee: Mark Geiger (United States)

June 23 2014 FIFA World Cup	Netherlands	2–0	Chile	São Paulo, Brazil
13:00 (UTC−3)	Fer 77'; Depay 90+2'	Report		Stadium: Arena de São Paulo; Attendance: 62,996; Referee: Bakary Gassama (Gambia)

June 28 2014 FIFA World Cup	Brazil	1–1 (a.e.t.) (3–2 p)	Chile	Belo Horizonte, Brazil
13:00 (UTC−3)	David Luiz 18'	Report	Sánchez 32'	Stadium: Estádio Mineirão; Attendance: 57,714; Referee: Howard Webb (England)
	Penalties
	David Luiz (penalty scored); Willian (penalty missed); Marcelo (penalty scored); Hulk (penalty missed); Neymar (penalty scored)		(penalty missed) Pinilla; (penalty missed) Sánchez; (penalty scored) Aránguiz; (penalty scored) Díaz; (penalty missed) Jara

==== Friendly matches ====
January 22 Friendly	Chile	4–0	Costa Rica	Coquimbo, Chile
21:00 (UTC−3)	Albornoz 13'; P. Hernández 51', 54'; C. Muñoz 79'	Report		Stadium: Estadio Municipal Francisco Sánchez Rumoroso; Attendance: 17,000; Referee: Mauro Vigliano (Argentina)

March 5 Friendly	Germany	1–0	Chile	Stuttgart, Germany
21:45 (UTC+1)	Götze 16'	Report		Stadium: Mercedes-Benz Arena; Attendance: 54,449; Referee: Mark Clattenburg (England)

May 30 Friendly	Chile	3–2	Egypt	Santiago, Chile
20:30 (UTC−4)	Díaz 26'; Vargas 60', 78'	Report	Salah 12'; Kamar 16'	Stadium: Estadio Nacional Julio Martínez Prádanos; Attendance: 30,000; Referee: Óscar Maldonado (Bolivia)

June 4 Friendly	Chile	2–0	Northern Ireland	Valparaíso, Chile
20:00 (UTC−4)	Vargas 79'; Pinilla 82'	Report		Stadium: Estadio Elías Figueroa Brander; Attendance: 20,000; Referee: Carlos Amarilla (Paraguay)

September 6 Friendly	Mexico	0–0	Chile	Santa Clara, United States
18:00 UTC−8		Report		Stadium: Levi's Stadium; Attendance: 67,000; Referee: Juan Guzmán (United States)

September 9 Friendly	Chile	1–0	Haiti	Fort Lauderdale, United States
20:00 UTC−4	Delgado 20'	Report		Stadium: Lockhart Stadium; Attendance: 10,000; Referee: Óscar Moncada (Honduras)

October 10 Friendly	Chile	3–0	Peru	Valparaíso, Chile
20:00 UTC−3	Vargas 28', 53'; Medel 34'	Report		Stadium: Estadio Elías Figueroa Brander; Attendance: 17,000; Referee: Julio Quintana (Paraguay)

October 14 Friendly	Chile	2–2	Bolivia	Coquimbo, Chile
20:00 UTC−3	Aránguiz 42'; Vidal 90+1' (pen.)	Report	Saucedo 14', 51'	Stadium: Estadio Municipal Francisco Sánchez Rumoroso; Attendance: 14,000; Referee: Pablo Díaz (Argentina)

November 14 Friendly	Chile	5–0	Venezuela	Talcahuano, Chile
20:00 UTC−3	A. Sánchez 17'; Valdivia 45+1'; Vargas 55'; Millar 78'; Hernández 90+3'	Report		Stadium: Estadio CAP; Attendance: 10,200; Referee: Antonio Arias (Paraguay)

November 18 Friendly	Chile	1–2	Uruguay	Santiago, Chile
21:00 (UTC−3)	A. Sánchez 28'	Report	Rolán 45+1'; González 80'	Stadium: Estadio Monumental David Arellano; Attendance: 40,000; Referee: Carlos Vera (Ecuador)

== Record ==
Competition	GP	W	D	L	GF	GA
International Friendly	9	6	2	1	20	5
2014 FIFA World Cup	4	2	1	1	6	4
Total	13	8	3	2	26	9

== Goal scorers ==
Player	Goals
Eduardo Vargas	7
Alexis Sánchez	4
Pablo Hernández	3
Jorge Valdivia	2
Charles Aránguiz	2
Rodrigo Millar	1
Arturo Vidal	1
Gary Medel	1
Juan Delgado	1
Jean Beausejour	1
Mauricio Pinilla	1
Marcelo Díaz	1
Carlos Muñoz	1
Miiko Albornoz	1
