= Álvaro Ramos (footballer) =

Chilean footballer (born 1992)

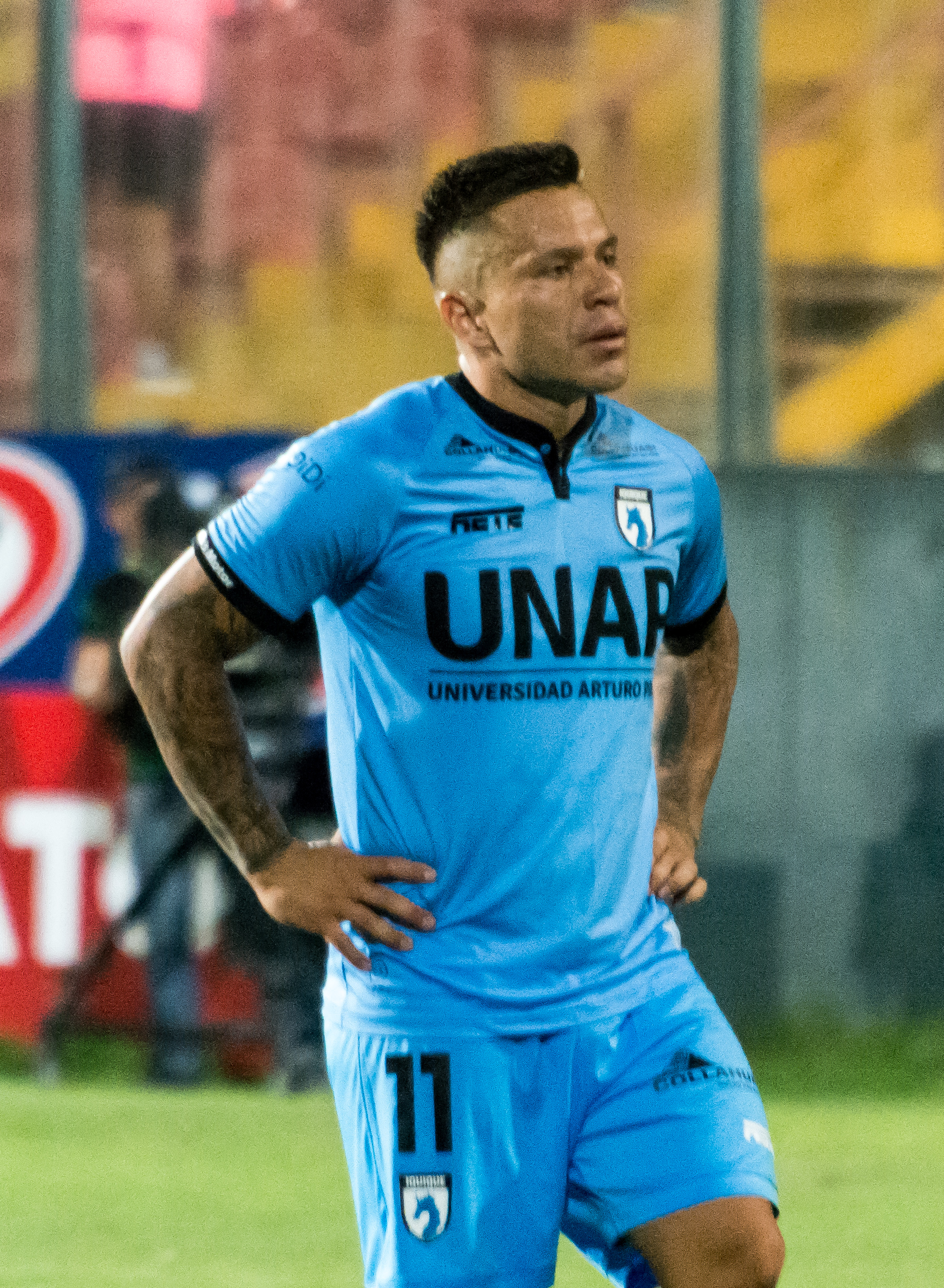

Personal information
- Full name: Álvaro Sebastián Ramos Sepulveda
- Date of birth: 14 April 1992 (age 34)
- Place of birth: Iquique, Chile
- Height: 1.67 m (5 ft 5 1/2 in)
- Position: Forward

Team information
- Current team: Deportes Iquique
- Number: 11

Youth career
- 2004–2009: Deportes Iquique

Senior career*
Years	Team	Apps	(Gls)
2008–2012	Deportes Iquique	81	(23)
2012–2016	Universidad Católica	73	(11)
2015–2016	→ Santiago Wanderers (loan)	32	(8)
2016–2017	Deportes Iquique	29	(11)
2017–2019	León	20	(1)
2018–2019	→ Everton (loan)	34	(6)
2020–2021	Deportes Iquique	50	(17)
2022	Coquimbo Unido	10	(0)
2022–	Deportes Iquique	15	(5)

International career^{‡}
2009	Chile U17	3	(0)
2011	Chile U20	7	(0)
2017	Chile	1	(0)
- * Club domestic league appearances and goals as of 8 July 2022 ‡ National team caps and goals as of 7 January 2020

Álvaro Sebastián Ramos Sepúlveda (Note: In this Chilean name, the first or paternal surname is Ramos and the second or maternal family name is Sepúlveda.) (Spanish pronunciation: [ˈalβaɾo ˈramos], born 14 April 1992) is a Chilean football player that currently plays for Deportes Iquique as a forward.

== Honours ==
=== Club ===
Deportes Iquique

- Copa Chile: 2010
- Primera B: 2010

=== International ===
Chile

- China Cup: 2017
