= Kevin Valenzuela =

Chilean footballer (born 1993)

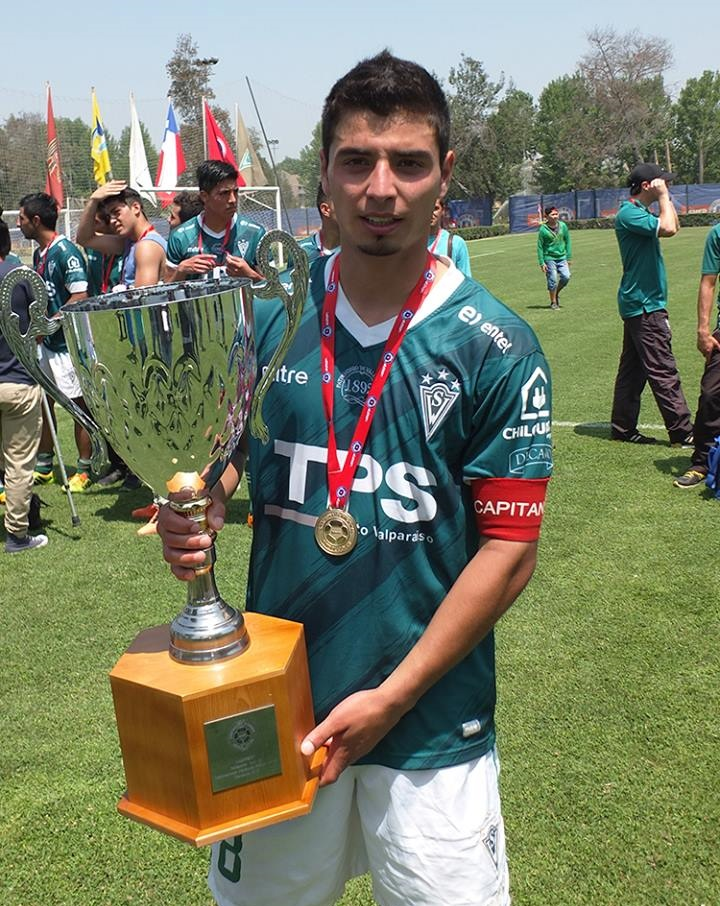
- Valenzuela with Santiago Wanderers in 2014

Personal information
- Full name: Kevin Douglas Valenzuela Fuentes
- Date of birth: 30 July 1993 (age 33)
- Place of birth: Villa Alemana, Chile
- Height: 1.73 m (5 ft 8 in)
- Position: Midfielder

Youth career
- 2007–2013: Santiago Wanderers

Senior career*
| Years | Team | Apps | (Gls) |
| 2013–2020 | Santiago Wanderers | 51 | (0) |
| 2019–2020 | → Ñublense (loan) | 18 | (0) |
| 2021 | Colchagua | 11 | (0) |
| 2022 | Deportes Puerto Montt | 18 | (0) |
| 2024 | Concón National | 17 | (1) |
- * Club domestic league appearances and goals as of 27 January 2024

Kevin Douglas Valenzuela Fuentes (born 30 July 1993) is a Chilean footballer who plays as a midfielder.

== Club career ==
He began his career at Santiago Wanderers youth set-up and was the team's first captain in won the Youth Primera División championship. In 2013 after being promoted the first-adult team in January, he debuted in a 1–0 away loss with Rangers at Estadio Fiscal de Talca on 5 May.
