= Yang Shanping =

Chinese footballer

Yang Shanping 杨善平
Personal information
- Full name: Yang Shanping
- Date of birth: 28 October 1987 (age 39)
- Place of birth: Dalian, Liaoning, China
- Height: 1.88 m (6 ft 2 in)
- Position: Defender

Youth career
- 2001–2002: Dalian Yiteng
- 2003–2004: Liaoning FC

Senior career*
Years	Team	Apps	(Gls)
2005–2016	Liaoning Whowin	251	(7)
2017–2018	Tianjin Quanjian	14	(0)
2018	→ Dalian Yifang (loan)	25	(0)
2019–2020	Dalian Professional	8	(0)
Total		298	(7)

International career^{‡}
2013–2017	China	3	(0)
- * Club domestic league appearances and goals as of 31 December 2022 ‡ National team caps and goals as of 14 January 2017

Yang Shanping
- Simplified Chinese: 杨善平
- Traditional Chinese: 楊善平
Transcriptions
Standard Mandarin
- Hanyu Pinyin: Yáng Shànpíng
- IPA: [jǎŋ ʂâm pʰǐŋ] (Note: In isolation, 善 is pronounced [ʂân].)

Yang Shanping (Chinese: 杨善平; pinyin: Yáng Shànpíng; born 28 October 1987) is a Chinese former professional footballer who played as a defender.

On 10 September 2024, Chinese Football Association announced that Yang was banned from football-related activities for lifetime for involving in match-fixing.

== Club career ==
Yang Shanping started his football career with Liaoning Whowin when he made his debut on 15 May 2005 in a 3–1 win against Shenzhen Jianlibao. After making his debut, he would become a regular and vital member within the team's defence. When he missed much of the 2008 league season, the team's performances suffered and Liaoning was subsequently relegated to the second tier. When Yang returned into the team, he would immediately aid them in their promotion push and saw the club win the second-tier league title.

Yang transferred to Chinese Super League newcomer Tianjin Quanjian on 2 January 2017. He made his debut in a league game for Tianjin on 4 March 2017 in a 2–0 away loss against Guangzhou R&F. Throughout the season he would struggle to establish himself as an integral member of the team and only make 14 league appearances.

On 28 February 2018, Yang was loaned to top-tier club Dalian Yifang (now known as Dalian Professional) for the 2018 season. He would make his debut in a league game on 3 March 2018 against Shanghai SIPG in an 8–0 defeat. Despite the heavy loss he would go on to establish himself as an integral member of the team's defence and would make his permanent on 13 February 2019.

On September 10, 2024, Yang was accused of "participating in unfair transactions, manipulating football matches, and obtaining illegal profits" and was banned from engaging in any football-related activities in China for life.

== International career ==
Yang made his debut for the Chinese national team on 6 June 2013 in a 2–1 loss against Uzbekistan where he came on as a substitute for Zhao Peng.

== Career statistics ==
Statistics accurate as of match played 31 December 2022.

Appearances and goals by club, season and competition
Club	Season	League			National Cup		League Cup		Continental		Total	
Club	Season	Division	Apps	Goals	Apps	Goals	Apps	Goals	Apps	Goals	Apps	Goals
Liaoning Whowin	2005	Chinese Super League	13	0	0	0	4	0	-		17	0
Liaoning Whowin	2006	Chinese Super League	18	1	0	0	-		-		18	1
Liaoning Whowin	2007	Chinese Super League	27	1	-		-		-		27	1
Liaoning Whowin	2008	Chinese Super League	9	0	-		-		-		9	0
Liaoning Whowin	2009	China League One	24	0	-		-		-		24	0
Liaoning Whowin	2010	Chinese Super League	30	1	-		-		-		30	1
Liaoning Whowin	2011	Chinese Super League	4	0	2	0	-		-		6	0
Liaoning Whowin	2012	Chinese Super League	26	1	4	0	-		-		30	1
Liaoning Whowin	2013	Chinese Super League	27	1	2	0	-		-		29	1
Liaoning Whowin	2014	Chinese Super League	18	0	1	0	-		-		19	0
Liaoning Whowin	2015	Chinese Super League	27	2	1	0	-		-		28	2
Liaoning Whowin	2016	Chinese Super League	28	0	0	0	-		-		28	0
Liaoning Whowin	Total		251	7	10	0	4	0	0	0	265	7
Tianjin Quanjian	2017	Chinese Super League	14	0	2	0	-		-		16	0
Dalian Yifang (loan)	2018	Chinese Super League	25	0	2	0	-		-		27	0
Dalian Professional	2019	Chinese Super League	8	0	1	0	-		-		9	0
Career total			298	7	15	0	4	0	0	0	317	7

== Honours ==
=== Club ===
Liaoning Whowin

- China League One: 2009.
