= Zheng Tao (footballer) =

Chinese footballer

Zheng Tao 郑涛
Personal information
- Date of birth: 20 August 1985 (age 41)
- Place of birth: Dalian, Liaoning, China
- Height: 1.83 m (6 ft 0 in)
- Position: Full-back

Team information
- Current team: Dalian Yingbo (fitness coach)

Senior career*
Years	Team	Apps	(Gls)
2004–2010	Shaanxi Chanba	114	(3)
2011–2016	Liaoning Whowin	136	(1)
2017–2019	Chongqing Lifan	9	(0)

Managerial career
- 2025-: Dalian Yingbo (fitness)
- * Club domestic league appearances and goals as of 31 December 2019

Zheng Tao (simplified Chinese: 郑涛; traditional Chinese: 鄭濤; pinyin: Zhèng Tāo) is a Chinese former football player who played as a full-back, currently serving as a fitness coach at Dalian Yingbo.

== Club career ==
Zheng Tao started his professional career with Inter Shanghai (now known as Shaanxi Chanba) after graduating from their youth team in 2004. In his debut season he impressed many by quickly establishing himself within the team, eventually playing in 16 league games and seeing his team finish the league third. The following season would see him further establish himself by playing in 10 more games throughout the 2005 league season.

Inter Shanghai would move away from Shanghai to Xi'an City at the end of the 2005 league season and rename themselves Shaanxi Neo-China Chanba F.C. however their move to a new city brought about much instability towards the team and their results reflected this, even seeing them flirt with relegation in the 2007 league season. Zheng Tao, has however been a consistent regular within the team and despite a 2008 league season which saw him miss the majority of the season he has remained loyal to Shaanxi. In 2011, he moved to Liaoning Whowin.

On 4 January 2017, Zheng moved to fellow Super League side Chongqing Lifan.

== Career statistics ==
Statistics accurate as of match played 31 December 2019.

Appearances and goals by club, season and competition
Club	Season	League			National Cup		League Cup		Continental		Total	
Club	Season	Division	Apps	Goals	Apps	Goals	Apps	Goals	Apps	Goals	Apps	Goals
Inter Shanghai/ Shaanxi Chanba	2004	Chinese Super League	16	0		0					16	0
Inter Shanghai/ Shaanxi Chanba	2005	Chinese Super League	11	0		0			-		11	0
Inter Shanghai/ Shaanxi Chanba	2006	Chinese Super League	25	2		1	-		-		25	3
Inter Shanghai/ Shaanxi Chanba	2007	Chinese Super League	15	1	-		-		-		15	1
Inter Shanghai/ Shaanxi Chanba	2008	Chinese Super League	4	0	-		-		-		4	0
Inter Shanghai/ Shaanxi Chanba	2009	Chinese Super League	21	0	-		-		-		21	0
Inter Shanghai/ Shaanxi Chanba	2010	Chinese Super League	22	0	-		-		-		22	0
Inter Shanghai/ Shaanxi Chanba	Total		114	3		1	0	0	0	0	114	4
Liaoning Whowin	2011	Chinese Super League	28	0	0	0	-		-		28	0
Liaoning Whowin	2012	Chinese Super League	25	0	3	0	-		-		28	0
Liaoning Whowin	2013	Chinese Super League	29	1	2	0	-		-		31	1
Liaoning Whowin	2014	Chinese Super League	13	0	1	0	-		-		14	0
Liaoning Whowin	2015	Chinese Super League	16	0	0	0	-		-		16	0
Liaoning Whowin	2016	Chinese Super League	25	0	0	0	-		-		25	0
Liaoning Whowin	Total		136	1	6	0	0	0	0	0	142	1
Chongqing Lifan	2017	Chinese Super League	5	0	0	0	-		-		5	0
Chongqing Lifan	2018	Chinese Super League	4	0	1	0	-		-		5	0
Chongqing Lifan	Total		9	0	1	0	0	0	0	0	10	0
Career total			259	4	7	1	0	0	0	0	266	5
