= Guangxi Sports Center =

Sports venue in Nanning, Guangxi, China

Guangxi Stadium
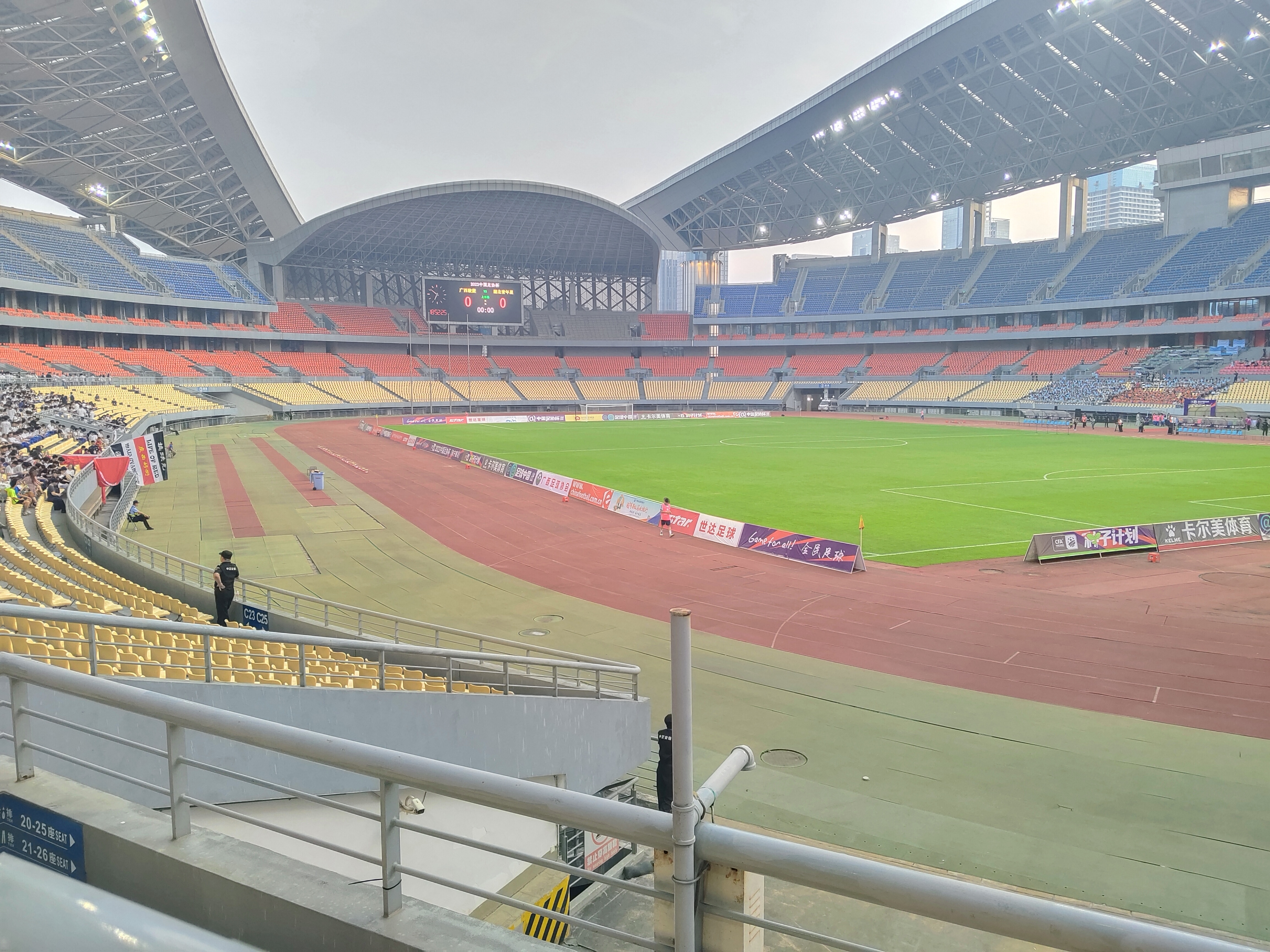
- Interactive map of Guangxi Stadium
- Full name: 广西体育中心
- Location: Nanning, Guangxi, China
- Coordinates: 22°45′46.8″N 108°23′22.2″E
- Capacity: 60,000
- Public transit: 4 at Guangxi Sports Center West; 4 at Guangxi Sports Center East

Construction
- Opened: 2010

Tenants
- Guangxi Hengchen (2024–); China national football team (some matches)

The Guangxi Sports Center (Chinese: 广西体育中心), (simplified Chinese: 广西省立体育场; traditional Chinese: 廣西省立體育場; pinyin: Guǎngxishěnglì Tǐyùchǎng), is a sports complex with a multi-purpose stadium knows as the Guangxi Stadium in Nanning, China. It is used mostly for football matches. The stadium opened in 2010, costing 1 billion RMD, and holds 60,000 spectators. The stadium hosted all matches of the 2017 China Cup.

The complex also included a leaf-shaped indoor arena with a total capacity of 9,247. The gymnasium hosted 2014 World Artistic Gymnastics Championships and the 2019 Sudirman Cup.
