= 44th Guangdong–Hong Kong Cup =

- Event: Guangdong–Hong Kong Cup
Hong Kong	Guangdong
4	4
- Guangdong won 4–3 on penalties

First leg
Hong Kong	Guangdong
2	2
- Date: 28 December 2025
- Venue: Hong Kong Stadium, So Kon Po, Hong Kong
- Referee: Cheung Wai Lung
- Attendance: 7,703

Second leg
Guangdong	Hong Kong
2	2
- Date: 3 January 2026
- Venue: Greater Bay Area Sports Center, Nansha, Guangzhou

The 44th Guangdong–Hong Kong Cup was held on 28 December 2025 and 3 January 2026.

== Squads ==
=== Guangdong ===
A 24-man squad for the first leg was announced on 27 December 2025.

- Head coach: (China) Wang Baoshan

No.	Pos.	Player	Date of birth (age)	Club
1	GK	Hao Mujian	10 January 2006 (age 20)	(Chinese Football Association) Shenzhen 2028
22	GK	Yuan Jianrui	8 February 2005 (age 21)	(Chinese Football Association) Shenzhen 2028
3	DF	Yuan Zinan	28 April 2005 (age 21)	(Chinese Football Association) Shenzhen 2028
4	DF	Jiang Zhipeng	6 March 1989 (age 37)	(Chinese Football Association) Shenzhen Peng City
5	DF	Hai Jieqing	10 August 2005 (age 20)	(Chinese Football Association) Shenzhen 2028
9	DF	Luo Kaisa	6 July 2005 (age 20)	(Chinese Football Association) Shenzhen 2028
15	DF	Chen Ziwen	8 January 2006 (age 20)	(Chinese Football Association) Shenzhen 2028
27	DF	Liu Quanfeng	18 April 2006 (age 20)	(Chinese Football Association) Shenzhen 2028
29	DF	Deng Zhitao	15 March 2005 (age 21)	(Chinese Football Association) Shenzhen 2028
46	DF	Li Mingjie	8 February 2005 (age 21)	(Chinese Football Association) Shenzhen 2028
55	DF	Huang Keqi	21 November 2005 (age 20)	(Chinese Football Association) Shenzhen 2028
6	MF	Luan Cheng	6 December 2005 (age 20)	(Chinese Football Association) Shenzhen 2028
8	MF	Chen Wei	28 May 2005 (age 20)	(Chinese Football Association) Shenzhen 2028
10	MF	Li Peilin	28 September 2006 (age 19)	(Chinese Football Association) Shenzhen 2028
13	MF	Zhu Xusheng	19 February 2005 (age 21)	(Chinese Football Association) Shenzhen 2028
16	MF	Liao Lisheng	29 April 1993 (age 33)	(Chinese Football Association) Shenzhen Peng City
18	MF	Hu Hongbin	26 August 2005 (age 20)	(Chinese Football Association) Shenzhen 2028
28	MF	Wang Zhiyuan	18 February 2005 (age 21)	(Chinese Football Association) Shenzhen 2028
34	MF	Hou Yu	31 January 2001 (age 25)	(Chinese Football Association) Guangdong GZ-Power
17	FW	Shi Zihao	10 February 2006 (age 20)	(Chinese Football Association) Shenzhen 2028
20	FW	Li Lehang	28 September 2005 (age 20)	(Chinese Football Association) Shenzhen 2028
33	FW	Jiang Wenjing	7 November 2006 (age 19)	(Chinese Football Association) Shenzhen 2028
47	FW	Huang Zishun	21 March 2005 (age 21)	(Chinese Football Association) Shenzhen 2028
57	FW	Wang Ziyang	25 January 2006 (age 20)	(Chinese Football Association) Shenzhen 2028

A 24-man squad for the second leg was announced on 31 December 2025.

- Head coach: (China) Wang Baoshan

No.	Pos.	Player	Date of birth (age)	Club
1	GK	Hao Mujian	10 January 2006 (age 20)	(Chinese Football Association) Shenzhen 2028
22	GK	Yuan Jianrui	8 February 2005 (age 21)	(Chinese Football Association) Shenzhen 2028
3	DF	Yuan Zinan	28 April 2005 (age 21)	(Chinese Football Association) Shenzhen 2028
4	DF	Jiang Zhipeng	6 March 1989 (age 37)	(Chinese Football Association) Shenzhen Peng City
5	DF	Hai Jieqing	10 August 2005 (age 20)	(Chinese Football Association) Shenzhen 2028
9	DF	Luo Kaisa	6 July 2005 (age 20)	(Chinese Football Association) Shenzhen 2028
15	DF	Chen Ziwen	8 January 2006 (age 20)	(Chinese Football Association) Shenzhen 2028
27	DF	Liu Quanfeng	18 April 2006 (age 20)	(Chinese Football Association) Shenzhen 2028
29	DF	Deng Zhitao	15 March 2005 (age 21)	(Chinese Football Association) Shenzhen 2028
46	DF	Li Mingjie	8 February 2005 (age 21)	(Chinese Football Association) Shenzhen 2028
55	DF	Huang Keqi	21 November 2005 (age 20)	(Chinese Football Association) Shenzhen 2028
6	MF	Luan Cheng	6 December 2005 (age 20)	(Chinese Football Association) Shenzhen 2028
7	MF	Yi Xianlong	3 March 2001 (age 25)	(Chinese Football Association) Meizhou Hakka
10	MF	Li Peilin	28 September 2006 (age 19)	(Chinese Football Association) Shenzhen 2028
13	MF	Zhu Xusheng	19 February 2005 (age 21)	(Chinese Football Association) Shenzhen 2028
18	MF	Hu Hongbin	26 August 2005 (age 20)	(Chinese Football Association) Shenzhen 2028
28	MF	Wang Zhiyuan	18 February 2005 (age 21)	(Chinese Football Association) Shenzhen 2028
30	MF	Pan Nuojun	23 March 2007 (age 19)	(Chinese Football Association) Shenzhen 2028
34	MF	Hou Yu	31 January 2001 (age 25)	(Chinese Football Association) Guangdong GZ-Power
17	FW	Shi Zihao	10 February 2006 (age 20)	(Chinese Football Association) Shenzhen 2028
20	FW	Li Lehang	28 September 2005 (age 20)	(Chinese Football Association) Shenzhen 2028
33	FW	Jiang Wenjing	7 November 2006 (age 19)	(Chinese Football Association) Shenzhen 2028
42	FW	Yang Hao	13 July 2003 (age 22)	(Chinese Football Association) Guangdong GZ-Power
57	FW	Wang Ziyang	25 January 2006 (age 20)	(Chinese Football Association) Shenzhen 2028

=== Hong Kong ===
A 23-man final squad for the first leg was announced on 19 December 2025.

- Head coach: (Hong Kong) Roberto Losada

No.	Pos.	Player	Date of birth (age)	Club
1	GK	Ng Wai Him	30 June 2002 (age 23)	(Football Association of Hong Kong, China) Southern
18	GK	Pong Cheuk Hei	31 January 2004 (age 22)	(Football Association of Hong Kong, China) Kitchee
2	DF	Leung Nok Hang	14 November 1994 (age 31)	Free agent
3	DF	Jay Haddow	2 April 2004 (age 22)	(Football Association of Hong Kong, China) Kitchee
4	DF	Lee Ka Ho	26 April 1993 (age 33)	(Football Association of Hong Kong, China) Tai Po
5	DF	Dudu	17 April 1990 (age 36)	(Football Association of Hong Kong, China) Lee Man
15	DF	Remi Dujardin	23 June 1997 (age 28)	(Football Association of Hong Kong, China) Tai Po
17	DF	Jordan Lam	2 February 1999 (age 27)	(Football Association of Hong Kong, China) Kitchee
19	DF	Kam Chi Kin	6 March 2004 (age 22)	(Football Association of Hong Kong, China) Kitchee
23	DF	Sun Ming Him	19 June 2000 (age 25)	(Chinese Football Association) Tianjin Jinmen Tiger
6	MF	Wu Chun Ming	21 November 1997 (age 28)	(Football Association of Hong Kong, China) Lee Man
8	MF	Ngan Cheuk Pan	22 January 1998 (age 28)	(Football Association of Hong Kong, China) Tai Po
12	MF	Ma Hei Wai	3 February 2004 (age 22)	(Chinese Football Association) Shaanxi Union
14	MF	Yu Joy Yin	8 October 2001 (age 24)	(Chinese Football Association) Shijiazhuang Gongfu
16	MF	Tan Chun Lok	15 January 1996 (age 30)	(Football Association of Hong Kong, China) Kitchee
21	MF	Barak Braunshtain	10 June 1999 (age 26)	(Football Association of Hong Kong, China) Lee Man
7	FW	Juninho	11 December 1990 (age 35)	(Football Association of Hong Kong, China) Kitchee
9	FW	Lau Ka Kiu	10 February 2002 (age 24)	(Football Association of Hong Kong, China) Lee Man
10	FW	Lau Chi Lok	15 October 1993 (age 32)	(Football Association of Hong Kong, China) Rangers
11	FW	Everton Camargo	25 May 1991 (age 34)	(Football Association of Hong Kong, China) Lee Man
13	FW	Lee Lok Him	18 April 2004 (age 22)	(Football Association of Hong Kong, China) Tai Po
20	FW	Michael Udebuluzor	1 April 2004 (age 22)	Free agent
22	FW	Sohgo Ichikawa	30 July 2004 (age 21)	(Football Association of Hong Kong, China) Southern

A 23-man final squad for the second leg was announced on 1 January 2026.

- Head coach: (Hong Kong) Roberto Losada

No.	Pos.	Player	Date of birth (age)	Club
1	GK	Ng Wai Him	30 June 2002 (age 23)	(Football Association of Hong Kong, China) Southern
18	GK	Pong Cheuk Hei	31 January 2004 (age 22)	(Football Association of Hong Kong, China) Kitchee
2	DF	Leung Nok Hang	14 November 1994 (age 31)	Free agent
3	DF	Jay Haddow	2 April 2004 (age 22)	(Football Association of Hong Kong, China) Kitchee
4	DF	Lee Ka Ho	26 April 1993 (age 33)	(Football Association of Hong Kong, China) Tai Po
5	DF	Dudu	17 April 1990 (age 36)	(Football Association of Hong Kong, China) Lee Man
12	DF	Vas Nuñez	22 November 1995 (age 30)	(Chinese Football Association) Yanbian Longding
15	DF	Remi Dujardin	23 June 1997 (age 28)	(Football Association of Hong Kong, China) Tai Po
17	DF	Jordan Lam	2 February 1999 (age 27)	(Football Association of Hong Kong, China) Kitchee
23	DF	Sun Ming Him	19 June 2000 (age 25)	(Chinese Football Association) Tianjin Jinmen Tiger
6	MF	Wu Chun Ming	21 November 1997 (age 28)	(Football Association of Hong Kong, China) Lee Man
8	MF	Ngan Cheuk Pan	22 January 1998 (age 28)	(Football Association of Hong Kong, China) Tai Po
14	MF	Yu Joy Yin	8 October 2001 (age 24)	(Chinese Football Association) Shijiazhuang Gongfu
16	MF	Tan Chun Lok	15 January 1996 (age 30)	(Football Association of Hong Kong, China) Kitchee
19	MF	Wong Wai	17 September 1992 (age 33)	(Football Association of Hong Kong, China) Lee Man
24	MF	Cheng Chin Lung	7 January 1998 (age 28)	(Football Association of Hong Kong, China) Kitchee
7	FW	Juninho	11 December 1990 (age 35)	(Football Association of Hong Kong, China) Kitchee
9	FW	Lau Ka Kiu	10 February 2002 (age 24)	(Football Association of Hong Kong, China) Lee Man
10	FW	Lau Chi Lok	15 October 1993 (age 32)	(Football Association of Hong Kong, China) Rangers
11	FW	Everton Camargo	25 May 1991 (age 34)	(Football Association of Hong Kong, China) Lee Man
13	FW	Lee Lok Him	18 April 2004 (age 22)	(Football Association of Hong Kong, China) Tai Po
20	FW	Michael Udebuluzor	1 April 2004 (age 22)	Free agent
22	FW	Sohgo Ichikawa	30 July 2004 (age 21)	(Football Association of Hong Kong, China) Southern

== Match details ==
=== First leg ===
28 December 2025
20:00 UTC+8
First leg

Hong Kong	2–2	Guangdong
Sun Ming Him 41'; Everton 67' (pen.)	Report	Chen Wei 54'; Jiang Zhipeng 61'

Hong Kong Stadium, So Kon Po, Hong Kong
Attendance: 7,703
Referee: Cheung Wai Lung

=== Second leg ===
3 January 2026
16:30 UTC+8

Guangdong	2–2	Hong Kong
Jiang Zhipeng 16' (pen.); Yi Xianlong 35'	Report	Sun Ming Him 61'; Wong Wai 80'
Penalties
Jiang Zhipeng (penalty scored); Hou Yu (penalty scored); Li Lehang (penalty scored); Hai Jieqing (penalty scored)	4–3	(penalty scored) Udebuluzor; (penalty scored) Lau Ka Kiu; (penalty missed) Dudu; (penalty scored) Ngan Cheuk Pan; (penalty missed) Wong Wai

Greater Bay Area Sports Center, Nansha, Guangdong
