= 2027 China League One =

China League One
- Season: 2027
- Dates: 6 March – 6 November

The 2027 C'estbon Chinese Football League 1 (Chinese: 2027怡宝中国足球甲级联赛) will be the 24th season of China League One, the second tier of the Chinese football league pyramid, since its establishment in 2004.

== Clubs ==
=== Club changes ===
==== To League One ====
Teams promoted from 2026 China League Two

- Dalian Kewei
- Shandong Taishan B
- Guizhou Guiyang Athletic

Teams relegated from 2026 Chinese Super League

- Wuhan Three Towns
- Qingdao Hainiu

==== From League One ====
Teams promoted to 2027 Chinese Super League

- Guangdong GZ-Power
- Nantong Zhiyun

Teams relegated to 2027 China League Two

- Jiangxi Dingnan United
- Meizhou Hakka
- Foshan Nanshi

=== Stadiums and locations ===
2027 China League Two teams
2027 China League One teams in Jiangsu

Team	Head coach	City	Stadium	Capacity	2026 season
Wuhan Three Towns ^{R}	(China) Deng Zhuoxiang	Wuhan	Wuhan Sports Center Stadium	56,000	CSL, 15th
Qingdao Hainiu ^{R}	(Serbia) Milan Ristić	Qingdao	Qingdao Youth Football Stadium	50,000	CSL, 16th
Shaanxi Union	(China) Chen Tao	Xi'an	Xi'an International Football Center	60,235	3rd
Guangxi Hengchen	(China) Liu Junwei	Nanning	Guangxi Sports Center	60,000	4th
Guangxi Hengchen	(China) Liu Junwei	Nanning	Qinzhou Sports Center (Qinzhou)		4th
Shenzhen Juniors	(Spain) David Pirri	Shenzhen	Bao'an Stadium	44,050	5th
Yanbian Longding	(South Korea) Lee Ki-hyung	Yanji	Yanji Stadium	30,000	6th
Wuxi Wugo	(Portugal) Bruno Dias	Wuxi	Jiangyin Sports Centre (Jiangyin)	30,161	7th
Wuxi Wugo	(Portugal) Bruno Dias	Wuxi	Yixing Sports Center (Yixing)		7th
Shijiazhuang Gongfu	(Spain) Jesús Tato	Shijiazhuang	Yutong International Sports Center	38,000	8th
Changchun Yatai	(China) Yan Feng	Changchun	Development Area Stadium	23,400	9th
Ningbo	(Spain) Sergio Zarco Díaz	Ningbo	Ningbo Cixi Stadium (Cixi)	16,000	10th
Dalian K'un City	(China) Yang Lin	Dalian	Jinzhou Stadium	30,776	11th
Nanjing City	(Bulgaria) Zoran Janković	Nanjing	Wutaishan Stadium	22,000	12th
Suzhou Dongwu	(China) Guo Hui	Suzhou	Suzhou Sports Center	35,000	13th
Dalian Kewei ^{P}	(China) Xu Hui	Dalian (Zhongshan)	Dalian Football Youth Training Center	5,000	CL2, 1st
Shandong Taishan B ^{P}	(China) Zhang Haitao	Jinan	Linyi Olympic Sports Park (Linyi)	57,000	CL2, 2nd
Guizhou Guiyang Athletic ^{P}	(China) Chen Long	Guiyang	Guiyang Olympic Sports Center	51,636	CL2, 3rd (Relegation play-offs winner)

== League table ==
Pos	Team	Pld	W	D	L	GF	GA	GD	Pts	Promotion, qualification or relegation
1	Changchun Yatai	0	0	0	0	0	0	0	0	Promotion to Super League
2	Dalian Kewei	0	0	0	0	0	0	0	0	Promotion to Super League
3	Dalian K'un City	0	0	0	0	0	0	0	0	
4	Guangxi Hengchen	0	0	0	0	0	0	0	0	
5	Guizhou Guiyang Athletic	0	0	0	0	0	0	0	0	
6	Nanjing City	0	0	0	0	0	0	0	0	
7	Ningbo	0	0	0	0	0	0	0	0	
8	Qingdao Hainiu	0	0	0	0	0	0	0	0	
9	Shaanxi Union	0	0	0	0	0	0	0	0	
10	Shandong Taishan B (Note: Shandong Taishan B cannot qualify for Super League as they are the B team of Shandong Taishan. If Shandong Taishan relegates to League One, they must relegate to League Two regardless of their rank.)	0	0	0	0	0	0	0	0	
11	Shenzhen Juniors	0	0	0	0	0	0	0	0	
12	Shijiazhuang Gongfu	0	0	0	0	0	0	0	0	
13	Suzhou Dongwu	0	0	0	0	0	0	0	0	
14	Wuhan Three Towns	0	0	0	0	0	0	0	0	
15	Wuxi Wugo	0	0	0	0	0	0	0	0	Qualification for Relegation play-offs
16	Yanbian Longding	0	0	0	0	0	0	0	0	Relegation to League Two

First match(es) will be played: unknown. Source:
Rules for classification:
- During season: 1) Points; 2) Head-to-head points; 3) Head-to-head goal difference; 4) Head-to-head goals scored; 5) Goal difference; 6) Goals scored; 7) Rankings in the previous season. (Rules 2 to 4 are only applied when teams concerned have finished both/all the matches against others.)
- After season: 1) Points; 2) Head-to-head points; 3) Head-to-head goal difference; 4) Head-to-head goals scored; 5) Goal difference; 6) Goals scored; 7) Disciplinary points (yellow card = 1 point, red card = 3 points); 8) Drawing of lots.
  Notes:

== Results ==
Home \ Away	CCY	DLK	DKC	GXH	GGA	NJC	NIB	QDH	SXU	SDT	SZJ	SJZ	SZD	WTT	WXW	YBL
Changchun Yatai	—															
Dalian Kewei		—														
Dalian K'un City			—													
Guangxi Hengchen				—												
Guizhou Guiyang Athletic					—											
Nanjing City						—										
Ningbo							—									
Qingdao Hainiu								—								
Shaanxi Union									—							
Shandong Taishan B										—						
Shenzhen Juniors											—					
Shijiazhuang Gongfu												—				
Suzhou Dongwu													—			
Wuhan Three Towns														—		
Wuxi Wugo															—	
Yanbian Longding																—

First match(es) will be played: unknown. Source:
Legend: Blue = home team win; Yellow = draw; Red = away team win.
For upcoming matches, an "a" indicates there is an article about the rivalry between the two participants.

== Positions by round ==
To preserve chronological evolvements, any postponed matches are not included to the round at which they were originally scheduled, but added to the full round they were played immediately afterwards. For example, if a match is scheduled for round 7, but then played between rounds 8 and 9, it will be added to the standings for round 8.

Team ╲ Round	1	2	3	4	5	6	7	8	9	10	11	12	13	14	15	16	17	18	19	20	21	22	23	24	25	26	27	28	29	30
Changchun Yatai																														
Dalian Kewei																														
Dalian K'un City																														
Guangxi Hengchen																														
Guizhou Guiyang Athletic																														
Nanjing City																														
Ningbo																														
Qingdao Hainiu																														
Shaanxi Union																														
Shandong Taishan B																														
Shenzhen Juniors																														
Shijiazhuang Gongfu																														
Suzhou Dongwu																														
Wuhan Three Towns																														
Wuxi Wugo																														
Yanbian Longding																														

Leader and promotion to Super League
Promotion to Super League
Qualification to Relegation play-offs
Relegation to League Two

First match(es) will be played on ?. Source:

== Results by match played ==
Team ╲ Round	1	2	3	4	5	6	7	8	9	10	11	12	13	14	15	16	17	18	19	20	21	22	23	24	25	26	27	28	29	30
Changchun Yatai																														
Dalian Kewei																														
Dalian K'un City																														
Guangxi Hengchen																														
Guizhou Guiyang Athletic																														
Nanjing City																														
Ningbo																														
Qingdao Hainiu																														
Shaanxi Union																														
Shandong Taishan B																														
Shenzhen Juniors																														
Shijiazhuang Gongfu																														
Suzhou Dongwu																														
Wuhan Three Towns																														
Wuxi Wugo																														
Yanbian Longding																														

First match(es) will be played on ?. Source:
W = Win; D = Draw; L = Loss

== See also ==
- 2027 Chinese Super League
- 2027 China League Two
