= 2027 Chinese Super League =

Chinese Super League
- Season: 2027
- Dates: 26 February – 23 October

The 2027 Chinese Super League, also known as the 2027 C'estbon Chinese Football Super League (Chinese: 2027怡宝中国足球超级联赛) for sponsorship reasons, is the 24th season since the establishment of the Chinese Super League.

== Teams ==
=== Club changes ===
==== To Super League ====
Clubs promoted from 2026 China League One

- Guangdong GZ-Power
- Nantong Zhiyun

==== From Super League ====
Clubs relegated to 2027 China League One

- Wuhan Three Towns
- Qingdao Hainiu

=== Stadiums and locations ===
Locations of the 2027 Chinese Super League teams

Team	City	Stadium	Capacity	2026 season
Dalian Yingbo	Dalian	Dalian Suoyuwan Football Stadium	63,671	1st
Chengdu Rongcheng	Chengdu	Phoenix Hill Football Stadium	50,695	2nd
Beijing Guoan	Beijing	Workers' Stadium	68,000	3rd
Shandong Taishan	Jinan	Jinan Olympic Sports Center Stadium	56,808	4th
Shanghai Port	Shanghai (Pudong)	Pudong Football Stadium	37,000	5th
Yunnan Yukun	Yuxi	Yuxi Plateau Sports Center Stadium	30,300	6th
Shanghai Shenhua	Shanghai (Xuhui)	Shanghai Stadium	72,436	7th
Qingdao West Coast	Qingdao	Qingdao West Coast University City Sports Center	27,000	8th
Zhejiang	Hangzhou	Huanglong Sports Center Stadium	51,971	9th
Chongqing Tonglianglong	Chongqing	Longxing Football Stadium	60,295	10th
Shenzhen Peng City	Shenzhen	Shenzhen Sports Center Stadium	45,000	11th
Tianjin Jinmen Tiger	Tianjin	TEDA Soccer Stadium	36,390	12th
Tianjin Jinmen Tiger	Tianjin	Tianjin Olympic Centre	54,696	12th
Liaoning Tieren	Shenyang	Tiexi Stadium	40,000	13th
Henan	Zhengzhou	Hanghai Stadium	29,860	14th
Guangdong GZ-Power ^{P}	Guangzhou	Yuexiushan Stadium	18,000	CL1, 1st
Nantong Zhiyun ^{P}	Rugao	Rugao Olympic Sports Center	25,000	CL1, 2nd

=== Managerial changes ===
Team	Outgoing manager	Manner of departure	Date of vacancy	Position in table	Incoming manager	Date of appointment
Chengdu Rongcheng	(Australia) John Aloisi	Undisclosed	9 November 2026	Pre-season		
Zhejiang	(Australia) Ross Aloisi	End of contract	9 November 2026	Pre-season		
Shandong Taishan	Tang Tian	Undisclosed	16 November 2026	Pre-season	(Serbia) Dragan Stojković	16 November 2026

== League table ==
Pos	Team	Pld	W	D	L	GF	GA	GD	Pts	Qualification or relegation
1	Beijing Guoan	0	0	0	0	0	0	0	0	Qualification for AFC Champions League Elite league stage
2	Chengdu Rongcheng	0	0	0	0	0	0	0	0	
3	Chongqing Tonglianglong	0	0	0	0	0	0	0	0	
4	Dalian Yingbo	0	0	0	0	0	0	0	0	
5	Guangdong GZ-Power	0	0	0	0	0	0	0	0	
6	Henan	0	0	0	0	0	0	0	0	
7	Liaoning Tieren	0	0	0	0	0	0	0	0	
8	Nantong Zhiyun	0	0	0	0	0	0	0	0	
9	Qingdao West Coast	0	0	0	0	0	0	0	0	
10	Shandong Taishan	0	0	0	0	0	0	0	0	
11	Shanghai Port	0	0	0	0	0	0	0	0	
12	Shanghai Shenhua	0	0	0	0	0	0	0	0	
13	Shenzhen Peng City	0	0	0	0	0	0	0	0	
14	Tianjin Jinmen Tiger	0	0	0	0	0	0	0	0	
15	Yunnan Yukun	0	0	0	0	0	0	0	0	Relegation to China League One
16	Zhejiang	0	0	0	0	0	0	0	0	Relegation to China League One

First match(es) will be played: unknown. Source:
Rules for classification:
- During season: 1) Points; 2) Head-to-head points; 3) Head-to-head goal difference; 4) Head-to-head goals scored; 5) Goal difference; 6) Goals scored; 7) Rankings in the previous season. (Rules 2 to 4 are only applied when teams concerned have finished both/all the matches against others.)
- After season: 1) Points; 2) Head-to-head points; 3) Head-to-head goal difference; 4) Head-to-head goals scored; 5) Goal difference; 6) Goals scored; 7) Disciplinary points (yellow card = 1 point, red card = 3 points); 8) Drawing of lots.

== Results ==
Home \ Away	BJG	CDR	CQT	DLY	GZP	HEN	LNT	NTZ	QWC	SDT	SHP	SHS	SPC	TJT	YNY	ZHJ
Beijing Guoan	—															
Chengdu Rongcheng		—														
Chongqing Tonglianglong			—													
Dalian Yingbo				—												
Guangdong GZ-Power					—											
Henan						—										
Liaoning Tieren							—									
Nantong Zhiyun								—								
Qingdao West Coast									—							
Shandong Taishan										—						
Shanghai Port											—					
Shanghai Shenhua												—				
Shenzhen Peng City													—			
Tianjin Jinmen Tiger														—		
Yunnan Yukun															—	
Zhejiang																—

First match(es) will be played: unknown. Source:
Legend: Blue = home team win; Yellow = draw; Red = away team win.
For upcoming matches, an "a" indicates there is an article about the rivalry between the two participants.

== Positions by round ==
To preserve chronological evolvements, any postponed matches are not included to the round at which they were originally scheduled, but added to the full round they were played immediately afterwards. For example, if a match is scheduled for round 7, but then played between rounds 8 and 9, it will be added to the standings for round 8.

Team ╲ Round	1	2	3	4	5	6	7	8	9	10	11	12	13	14	15	16	17	18	19	20	21	22	23	24	25	26	27	28	29	30
Beijing Guoan																														
Chengdu Rongcheng																														
Chongqing Tonglianglong																														
Dalian Yingbo																														
Guangdong GZ-Power																														
Henan																														
Liaoning Tieren																														
Nantong Zhiyun																														
Qingdao West Coast																														
Shandong Taishan																														
Shanghai Port																														
Shanghai Shenhua																														
Shenzhen Peng City																														
Tianjin Jinmen Tiger																														
Yunnan Yukun																														
Zhejiang																														

Leader and qualification for AFC Champions League Elite group stage
Relegation to China League One

First match(es) will be played on ?. Source:

== Results by match played ==
Team ╲ Round	1	2	3	4	5	6	7	8	9	10	11	12	13	14	15	16	17	18	19	20	21	22	23	24	25	26	27	28	29	30
Beijing Guoan																														
Chengdu Rongcheng																														
Chongqing Tonglianglong																														
Dalian Yingbo																														
Guangdong GZ-Power																														
Henan																														
Liaoning Tieren																														
Nantong Zhiyun																														
Qingdao West Coast																														
Shandong Taishan																														
Shanghai Port																														
Shanghai Shenhua																														
Shenzhen Peng City																														
Tianjin Jinmen Tiger																														
Yunnan Yukun																														
Zhejiang																														

First match(es) will be played on ?. Source:
W = Win; D = Draw; L = Loss

== See also ==
- 2027 China League One
- 2027 China League Two
- 2027 Chinese FA Cup
- 2027 Chinese FA Super Cup
