= Cai Haochang =

Chinese association football player

Personal information
- Date of birth: 23 February 1999 (age 27)
- Place of birth: Huizhou, Guangdong, China
- Height: 1.70 m (5 ft 7 in)
- Positions: Midfielder; left winger

Team information
- Current team: Guangdong GZ-Power
- Number: 8

Youth career
- –2016: Guangzhou R&F
- 2017–2018: Guangzhou Evergrande
- 2017–2018: Gondomar

Senior career*
Years	Team	Apps	(Gls)
2018–2020	Gondomar	28	(0)
2020–2022	Meizhou Hakka	36	(2)
2023	Heilongjiang Ice City	17	(0)
2024–	Guangdong GZ-Power	38	(1)

International career^{‡}
2017	China U19	1	(0)
- * Club domestic league appearances and goals as of 14:01, 31 December 2025 (UTC) ‡ National team caps and goals as of 14:01, 26 July 2021 (UTC)

Cai Haochang (simplified Chinese: 蔡浩畅; traditional Chinese: 蔡浩暢; pinyin: Cài Hàochàng; born 23 February 1999) is a Chinese footballer currently playing as a midfielder for Guangdong GZ-Power.

== Club career ==
Cai Haochang would play for youth teams in Guangzhou before joining Portuguese football club Gondomar on 14 September 2017. He would initially start in their youth team before graduating into their senior team and would make his debut appearance on 18 August 2018 against S.C. Mêda in a league game that ended in a 5-2 victory. On 30 September 2020, Cai would return to China to join second club Meizhou Hakka, where he made his debut on 7 October 2020 in a league game against Jiangxi Liansheng in a 3-2 victory. He would then go on to be a vital member of the team that gained promotion to the top tier after coming second within the division at the end of the 2021 China League One campaign.

== Career statistics ==
As of 31 December 2025.

Club	Season	League			Cup		Continental		Other		Total	
Club	Season	Division	Apps	Goals	Apps	Goals	Apps	Goals	Apps	Goals	Apps	Goals
Gondomar	2018–19	Campeonato de Portugal	8	0	2	0	–		–		10	0
Gondomar	2019–20	Campeonato de Portugal	20	0	1	0	–		–		21	0
Gondomar	Total		28	0	3	0	0	0	0	0	31	0
Meizhou Hakka	2020	China League One	5	1	0	0	–		–		5	1
Meizhou Hakka	2021	China League One	19	1	1	0	–		–		20	1
Meizhou Hakka	2022	Chinese Super League	11	0	1	0	–		–		12	0
Meizhou Hakka	Total		36	2	2	0	0	0	0	0	38	2
Heilongjiang Ice City	2023	China League One	17	0	0	0	–		–		17	0
Guangdong GZ-Power	2024	China League Two	25	1	1	0	–		–		26	1
Guangdong GZ-Power	2025	China League One	13	0	2	0	–		–		15	0
Guangdong GZ-Power	Total		38	1	3	0	0	0	0	0	41	1
Career total			119	3	8	0	0	0	0	0	127	3

== Honours ==
=== Club ===
Guangdong GZ-Power

- China League One: 2026
