= Udebuluzor =

Udebuluzor audio is a surname of Igbo origin in South eastern Nigeria.

== Notable people with the surname include ==
- Cornelius Udebuluzor (born 1974), Nigerian footballer
- Michael Udebuluzor (born 2004), Hong Kong footballer of Nigerian descent
