= Hou Yu =

Hou Yu is the name of:

- Hou Yu (footballer, born 1990), Chinese footballer
- Hou Yu (footballer, born 2001), Chinese footballer
