= Xiao Kun =

Chinese association football player

Personal information
- Date of birth: 15 February 1995 (age 31)
- Place of birth: Changsha, Hunan, China
- Height: 1.88 m (6 ft 2 in)
- Position: Midfielder

Team information
- Current team: Guangdong GZ-Power

Youth career
- Beijing Africa United FC
- 2013–2017: Peking University

Senior career*
Years	Team	Apps	(Gls)
2017–2019	Suzhou Dongwu	44	(3)
2020	Shanghai SIPG	0	(0)
2020–2024	Shenzhen Peng City	105	(10)
2024	Chongqing Tonglianglong	14	(0)
2025	Qingdao Hainiu	13	(1)
2026–	Guangdong GZ-Power	0	(0)
- * Club domestic league appearances and goals as of 28 August 2025

Xiao Kun (Chinese: 肖鲲; born 15 February 1995) is a Chinese professional footballer who plays as a midfielder for Guangdong GZ-Power.

== Career statistics ==
=== Club ===
As of 2 February 2025.

Club	Season	League			Cup		Continental		Other		Total	
Club	Season	Division	Apps	Goals	Apps	Goals	Apps	Goals	Apps	Goals	Apps	Goals
Suzhou Dongwu	2017	China League Two	9	0	1 (Note: Appearances in the Chinese FA Cup)	0	–		2 (Note: Appearances in the China League Two playoffs)	1	12	1
Suzhou Dongwu	2018	China League Two	5	0	2	0	–		2	0	9	0
Suzhou Dongwu	2019	China League Two	30	3	1	0	–		5	0	36	3
Suzhou Dongwu	Total		44	3	4	0	0	0	9	1	57	4
Shanghai Port	2020	Chinese Super League	0	0	0	0	–		0	0	0	0
Sichuan Jiuniu/ Shenzhen Peng City	2020	China League One	9	0	–		–		–		9	0
Sichuan Jiuniu/ Shenzhen Peng City	2021	China League One	31	6	5	0	–		–		36	6
Sichuan Jiuniu/ Shenzhen Peng City	2022	China League One	32	2	0	0	–		–		32	2
Sichuan Jiuniu/ Shenzhen Peng City	2023	China League One	24	2	2	0	–		–		26	2
Sichuan Jiuniu/ Shenzhen Peng City	2024	Chinese Super League	9	0	0	0	–		–		9	0
Sichuan Jiuniu/ Shenzhen Peng City	Total		105	10	7	0	0	0	0	0	112	10
Chongqing Tonglianglong	2024	China League One	14	0	0	0	–		–		14	0
Qingdao Hainiu	2025	Chinese Super League	0	0	0	0	–		–		0	0
Career total			163	13	11	0	0	0	9	1	183	14

== Honours ==
=== Club ===
Guangdong GZ-Power

- China League One: 2026
