= Liu Bin (footballer, born 1998) =

Chinese footballer

Liu Bin 刘斌
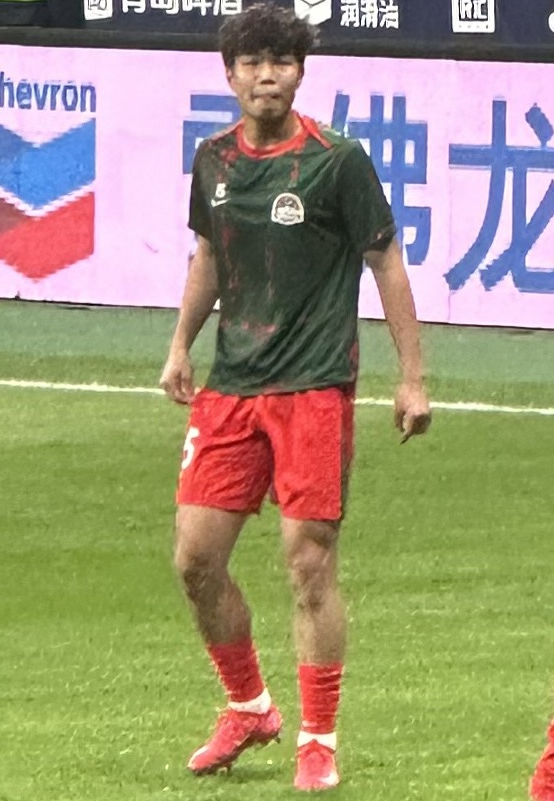
- Liu Bin in April 2025

Personal information
- Full name: Liu Bin
- Date of birth: 2 May 1998 (age 28)
- Place of birth: Jinan, Shandong, China
- Height: 1.86 m (6 ft 1 in)
- Position: Left-back

Team information
- Current team: Guangdong GZ-Power
- Number: 2

Youth career
- 2016: Tianjin Quanjian
- 2017: Guizhou Hengfeng

Senior career*
Years	Team	Apps	(Gls)
2017	Bežanija	0	(0)
2018–2020	Chongqing Dangdai	8	(0)
2020	Henan Jianye	0	(0)
2021–2023	Chengdu Rongcheng	43	(2)
2024–2025	Henan FC	23	(1)
2026–	Guangdong GZ-Power	0	(0)
- * Club domestic league appearances and goals ‡ National team caps and goals as of 1 January 2026

Liu Bin (Chinese: 刘斌; pinyin: Liú Bīn; born 2 May 1998) is a Chinese footballer who plays for Guangdong GZ-Power.

== Club career ==
Liu Bin signed with Serbian First League side FK Bežanija in July 2017. He joined Chinese Super League side Chongqing Dangdai Lifan on 2 January 2018. On 15 April 2018, he made his senior debut in a 3–3 home draw to Beijing Sinobo Guoan, coming on as a substitute for Liu Le in the 52nd minute. After two seasons with the club he would transfer to fellow top tier club Henan Jianye on 10 June 2020. He would not make any senior team appearances for Henan and on 11 April 2021 he would join second tier football club Chengdu Rongcheng. He would make his debut on 26 April 2021 in a league game against Jiangxi Beidamen, which ended in a 4-2 victory. At the end of the season he would establish himself as a regular within the team and aid them to promotion at the end of the 2021 league campaign. On 12 January 2026, Henan FC announced his departure after the 2025 season.

On 10 February 2026, Liu joined China League One club Guangdong GZ-Power.

== Career statistics ==
As of match played 1 January 2026.

Appearances and goals by club, season and competition
Club	Season	League			National Cup		Continental		Other		Total	
Club	Season	Division	Apps	Goals	Apps	Goals	Apps	Goals	Apps	Goals	Apps	Goals
Chongqing Dangdai	2018	Chinese Super League	8	0	1	0	–		–		9	0
Chongqing Dangdai	2019	Chinese Super League	0	0	0	0	–		–		0	0
Chongqing Dangdai	Total		8	0	1	0	0	0	0	0	9	0
Henan Jianye	2020	Chinese Super League	0	0	0	0	–		–		0	0
Chengdu Rongcheng	2021	China League One	20	2	3	0	–		2 (Note: Appearance(s) in CSL Relegation play-offs)	0	25	2
Chengdu Rongcheng	2022	Chinese Super League	14	0	3	1	–		–		17	1
Chengdu Rongcheng	2023	Chinese Super League	9	0	1	0	–		–		10	0
Chengdu Rongcheng	Total		43	2	7	1	0	0	2	0	52	3
Henan FC	2024	Chinese Super League	7	1	1	0	–		–		8	1
Henan FC	2025	Chinese Super League	16	0	1	0	–		–		17	0
Henan FC	Total		23	1	2	0	0	0	0	0	25	1
Career total			74	3	10	1	0	0	2	0	86	4

== Honours ==
=== Club ===
Guangdong GZ-Power

- China League One: 2026
