= 2027 China League Two =

China League Two
- Season: 2027
- Dates: 13 March – 7 November

The 2026 C'estbon Chinese Football League 2 (Chinese: 2026怡宝中国足球乙级联赛) will be the 38th season of China League Two, the third tier of the Chinese football league pyramid, since its establishment in 1989.

== Clubs ==
=== Club changes ===
==== To League Two ====
Teams promoted from 2026 Chinese Champions League

- Yulin Mobei Miners
- Shenzhen Jixiang
- Wuhan Lianzhen

Teams promoted from 2026 Chinese Youth Football Elite League (Division U21)

Teams relegated from 2026 China League One

- Jiangxi Dingnan United
- Meizhou Hakka
- Foshan Nanshi

==== From League Two ====
Teams promoted to 2027 China League One

- Dalian Kewei
- Shandong Taishan B
- Guizhou Guiyang Athletic

Teams relegated to 2027 Chinese Champions League

- Wenzhou
- Beijing IT
- Shanghai Second

Teams relegated to 2027 Chinese Youth Football Elite League (Division U21)

- Chengdu Rongcheng B

=== Stadiums and locations ===
Team	Head coach	City	Stadium	Capacity	2026 season
Jiangxi Dingnan United ^{R}	(China) Li Xiaoting	Dingnan	Dingnan Youth Football Training Center	12,000	CL1, 14th (Relegation play-offs loser)
Meizhou Hakka ^{R}	(China) Zhu Jiong	Wuhua	Huitang Stadium	27,000	CL1, 15th
Foshan Nanshi ^{R}	(China) Li Haijun	Foshan	Nanhai Sports Center	20,000	CL1, 16th
Shanxi Chongde Ronghai	(China) Cao Rui	Taiyuan	Taiyuan University Football Field	2,257	4th
Shanghai Port B	(China) Cheng Yaodong	Shanghai	Lingang Football Complex Sports Center	2,300	5th
Shenzhen 2028	(China) Wang Baoshan	Shenzhen	Shenzhen Youth Football Training Base Centre Stadium	10,000	6th
Hangzhou Linping Wuyue	(China) Xu Lei	Hangzhou	Linping Sports Centre Stadium	10,200	7th
Jiangxi Lushan	(South Korea) Choi Jin-han	Ruichang	Ruichang Sports Park Stadium	13,188	8th
Nantong Haimen Codion	(China) Gao Wanguo	Nantong	Haimen Sports Centre	15,000	9th
Hubei Istar	(China) Wan Houliang	Wuhan	Hubei Sports Bureau Football Administration Center Football Field	2,000	10th
Tai'an Tiankuang	(China) Qu Wenbo	Tai'an	Wenhe Sports Park Football Stadium	2,500	11th
Dalian Yingbo B	(China) Zhou Ting	Dalian	Puwan New District Stadium	30,000	12th
Lanzhou Longyuan Athletic	(China) Zhang Xiaorui	Lanzhou	Lanzhou Olympic Center Stadium	60,000	13th
Xiamen Feilu	(China) Wang Hao (de facto) (China) Lü Hongchen (de jure)	Xiamen	Haicang District Sports Center Stadium	15,755	14th
Guangdong Mingtu	(Spain) Ander Sanabria	Guangzhou (Yuexiu)	Guangdong Provincial People's Stadium	15,000	15th
Qingdao Red Lions	(China) Zhang Yang	Qingdao	Qingdao Tiantai Stadium	20,525	16th
Changchun Xidu	(China) Li Bin	Changchun	Yatai Training Center Main Stadium	7,000	17th
Ganzhou Ruishi	(China) Li Xiaoting	Ganzhou	Ganzhou Fitness Center	40,000	18th
Guangzhou Dandelion	(Japan) Kenichi Uemura	Guangzhou (Huadu)	Huadu Stadium	13,394	19th
Wuhan Three Towns B	(China) Chang Weiwei	Wuhan	Hankou Cultural Sports Centre	20,000	20th
Yulin Mobei Miners ^{P}					CMCL, 1st
Shenzhen Jixiang ^{P}					CMCL, 2nd
Wuhan Lianzhen ^{P}					CMCL, 3rd
Jiangsu Changjin or Zhejiang U20					

2027 China League Two teams
2027 China League Two teams
2027 China League Two teams in Guangdong

== See also ==
- 2027 Chinese Super League
- 2027 China League One
