= Han Xuan (disambiguation) =

Han Xuan was a Chinese government official and minor warlord during the late Eastern Han dynasty.

Han Xuan is also the name of:

- Han Xuan (footballer, born 1991), Chinese footballer
- Han Xuan (footballer, born 1995), Chinese footballer
