= Huang Shenghao =

Chinese footballer (born 2007)

Personal information
- Date of birth: 1 August 2007 (age 19)
- Place of birth: Guangzhou, Guangdong, China
- Height: 1.83 m (6 ft 0 in)
- Position: Midfielder

Team information
- Current team: Guangdong GZ-Power
- Number: 39

Youth career
- –2023: Guangzhou City

Senior career*
Years	Team	Apps	(Gls)
2023–	Guangdong GZ-Power	28	(1)

International career
2026–	China U19	1	(0)
2026–	China	3	(0)
- * Club domestic league appearances and goals as of 20 October 2024

Huang Shenghao (Chinese: 黄晟豪; born 1 August 2007) is a Chinese professional footballer who plays as a midfielder for Guangdong GZ-Power and the China national team.

== Early life ==
Huang was born on 1 August 2007 in Guangzhou, China to a Nigerian father and a Chinese mother. Growing up in Guangzhou, China, he is fluent in Cantonese.

== Club career ==
As a youth player, Huang joined the youth academy of Guangzhou City. In 2023, he signed for Guangdong GZ-Power, helping the club achieve promotion from the fourth tier to the second tier.

== International career ==
On 27 September 2026, Huang made his debut for the China national team in a friendly against New Zealand.

== Style of play ==
Huang plays as a midfielder. Chinese news website Sohu wrote in 2024 that he "plays as a defensive midfielder. He has strong defensive ability, covers a large area, and works diligently on the field".

== Honours ==
=== Club ===
Guangdong GZ-Power

- China League One: 2026
