= Patrick Popescu =

Romanian footballer

Personal information
- Full name: Patrick Popescu
- Date of birth: 19 December 1996 (age 29)
- Place of birth: Cluj-Napoca, Romania
- Height: 1.80 m (5 ft 11 in)
- Position: Attacking midfielder

Team information
- Current team: Meizhou Hakka
- Number: 7

Youth career
- –2015: Universitatea Cluj

Senior career*
Years	Team	Apps	(Gls)
2015–2018	Universitatea Cluj	16	(0)
2016	→ Novohrad Lučenec (loan)		
2018–2020	Pandurii Târgu Jiu	51	(5)
2020–2021	Aerostar Bacău	19	(1)
2021–2022	Unirea Dej	17	(0)
2022–2023	Politehnica Timișoara	8	(1)
2023–2025	Hegelmann	96	(20)
2026–	Meizhou Hakka	9	(1)
- * Club domestic league appearances and goals as of 30 May 2026

Patrick Popescu (born 19 December 1996) is a Romanian professional footballer who plays as an attacking midfielder for China League One club Meizhou Hakka.

== Career statistics ==
As of match played 30 May 2026

Appearances and goals by club, season and competition
Club	Season	League			National cup		Continental		Other		Total	
Club	Season	Division	Apps	Goals	Apps	Goals	Apps	Goals	Apps	Goals	Apps	Goals
Universitatea Cluj	2014–15	Liga I	1	0	0	0	—		—		1	0
Universitatea Cluj	2015–16	Liga II	15	0	2	1	—		—		17	1
Universitatea Cluj	Total		16	0	2	1	—		—		18	1
Pandurii Târgu Jiu	2018–19	Liga II	31	3	1	1	—		—		32	4
Pandurii Târgu Jiu	2019–20	Liga II	20	2	—		—		—		20	2
Pandurii Târgu Jiu	Total		51	5	1	1	—		—		52	6
Aerostar Bacău	2020–21	Liga II	19	1	0	0	—		—		19	1
Unirea Dej	2021–22	Liga II	17	0	0	0	—		—		17	0
ASU Politehnica Timișoara	2022–23	Liga II	8	1	—		—		—		8	1
Hegelmann	2023	A Lyga	28	8	2	0	2	0	—		32	8
Hegelmann	2024	A Lyga	33	8	5	0	—		—		38	8
Hegelmann	2025	A Lyga	35	4	4	1	2	0	—		40	5
Hegelmann	Total		96	20	11	1	4	0	—		111	21
Meizhou Hakka	2026	China League One	9	1	0	0	—		—		9	1
Career total			216	28	14	2	4	0	0	0	234	30

== Honours ==
Universitatea Cluj

- Liga III: 2017–18
- Liga IV – Cluj County: 2016–17

Hegelmann

- Lithuanian Cup runner-up: 2024, 2025
