= Roberto Losada =

Spanish-born Hong Kong footballer and manager (born 1976)

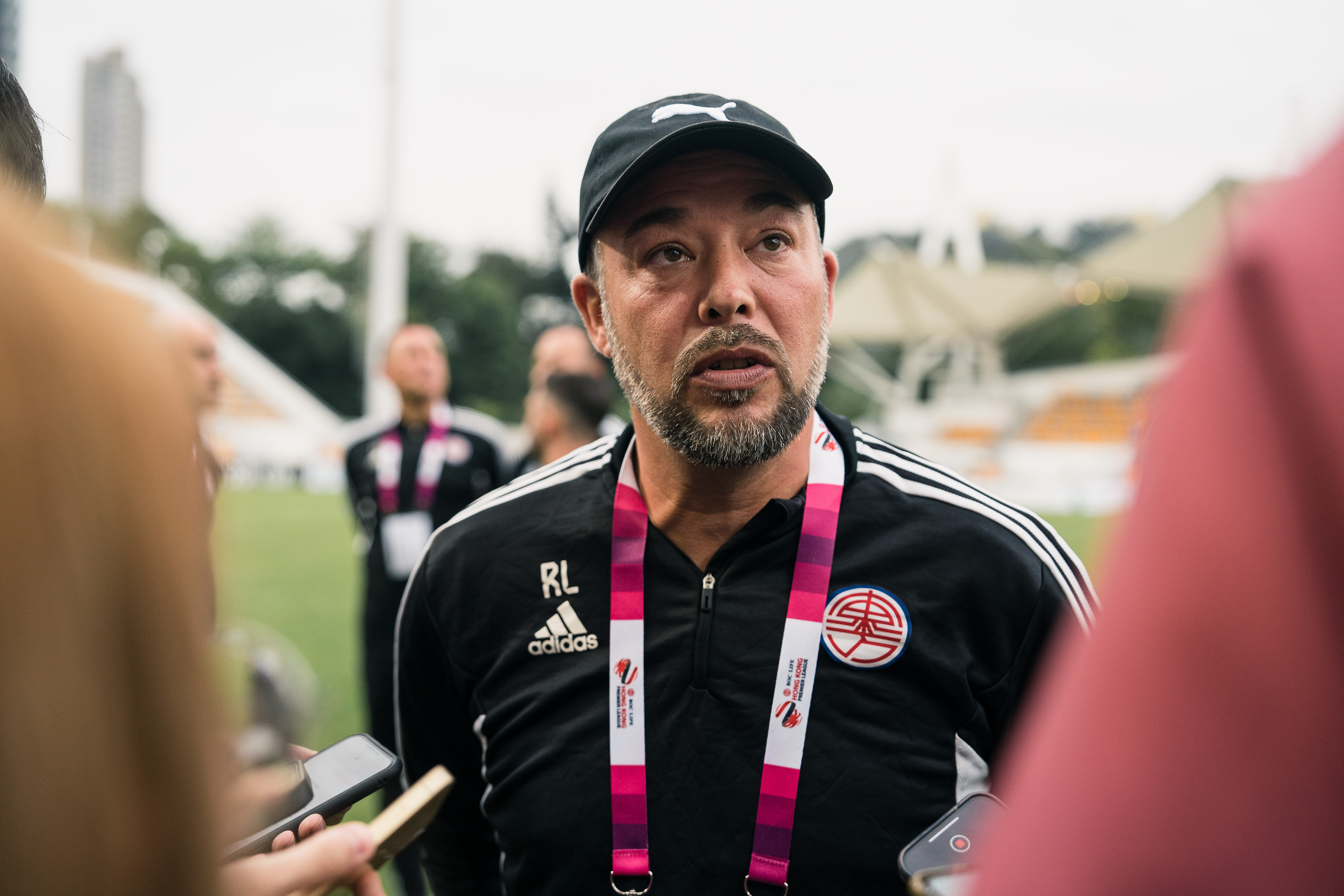
- Losada in 2024

Personal information
- Full name: Roberto Losada Rodríguez
- Date of birth: 25 October 1976 (age 50)
- Place of birth: Vigo, Spain
- Height: 1.80 m (5 ft 11 in)
- Position: Forward

Team information
- Current team: Hong Kong (head coach)

Youth career
- Sárdoma
- Oviedo

Senior career*
Years	Team	Apps	(Gls)
1994–1998	Oviedo B	67	(27)
1996–2003	Oviedo	103	(18)
1998–1999	→ Toledo (loan)	37	(8)
2002	→ Mallorca (loan)	13	(4)
2003–2007	Valladolid	67	(13)
2007	Las Palmas	17	(0)
2007–2010	Lugo	95	(21)
2010–2012	Kitchee	32	(17)
2012–2017	Resources Capital	41	(15)
2017–2018	Double Flower	9	(2)
Total		481	(125)

International career
2005–2008	Galicia	3	(1)

Managerial career
- 2012–2020: Kitchee (assistant)
- 2020–2021: Eastern (assistant)
- 2021–2025: Eastern
- 2024: Hong Kong (interim assistant)
- 2025–2026: Hong Kong (caretaker)
- 2026–: Hong Kong
Medal record
Men's football
Representing Hong Kong (as manager)
FIFA ASEAN Challenge Cup
Winner	2026 Hong Kong
- * Club domestic league appearances and goals

Roberto Losada Rodríguez (born 25 October 1976) is a Spanish professional football manager and former player. He is the head coach of the Hong Kong national team.

A forward, he amassed La Liga totals of 113 games and 27 goals over seven seasons, almost all with Real Oviedo. He also appeared in 124 Segunda División matches (16 goals), and spent two years in Hong Kong with Kitchee.

After retirement, Losada worked as the manager of Eastern in Hong Kong.

== Club career ==
Losada was born in Vigo, Province of Pontevedra. He made his professional debut for Real Oviedo at age 18, as the club was also in La Liga; after two season-long loans, at Toledo and Mallorca (the former in the Segunda División), he returned, going on to be an important attacking member– although mostly as a backup – as the Asturian team would eventually drop two tiers in just four years due to financial irregularities.

Losada left in the 2003–04 campaign to Real Valladolid in the top flight, equalling a career-best eight goals but again being relegated. After years of intermittent use, he left in January 2007 to another side in the second division, Las Palmas, not managing to score in his five-month spell.

In the summer of 2007, Losada returned to his native Galicia and signed with Lugo of Segunda División B. After three years, aged 33, he had his first abroad experience, joining Hong Kong club Kitchee and helping it win the national championship in his first season after 47 years. At the end of the campaign, he was also named Hong Kong Footballer of the Year and MVP, making the competition's Best Eleven.

Losada was made Kitchee's captain for 2011–12, replacing Lo Kwan Yee. He announced his retirement from professional football on 26 May 2012, after netting the 3–3 equaliser in stoppage time of extra time in the FA Cup final against Pegasus, which his team won.

== International career ==
Uncapped by Spain at any level, Losada played three games for the unofficial Galicia team. On 27 December 2008, he scored the deciding goal in a 3–2 win over Iran at the Estadio Riazor.

== Coaching career ==
=== Eastern ===
Losada immediately joined the club's coaching staff, being named his compatriot Josep Gombau's assistant. He retained his post under the latter's successor Àlex Gómez, only leaving on 8 September 2020.

On 16 October 2020, Losada signed with Eastern in the same capacity. He became their head coach the following year.

Losada led his team to the 2023–24 FA Cup, defeating Sham Shui Po 3–2 in the final.

=== Hong Kong ===
In June 2024, Losada was named interim assistant manager at the Hong Kong national team under Wolfgang Luisser. On 12 December 2025, after Ashley Westwood's departure, he was named interim head coach of the Hong Kong national team; his first assignment was the Guangdong–Hong Kong Cup, to be held until the following 3 January. Six days later, he left Eastern by mutual consent.

Despite failing to win the Guangdong–Hong Kong Cup, on 5 June 2026 Losada was confirmed in the role. However, four days later he oversaw a 2–0 loss to Cambodia, a first-ever against that opposition.

== Personal life ==
Losada was nicknamed El Chino due to his facial features. Born in Spain, he acquired his Hong Kong Special Administrative Region passport in 2018 after residing in the region for more than seven years.

== Managerial statistics ==
As of match played 3 October 2026

Managerial record by team and tenure
Team	Nat.	From	To	Record								Ref.
Team	Nat.	From	To	G	W	D	L	GF	GA	GD	Win %	Ref.
Eastern	(Hong Kong)	28 May 2021	11 December 2025	147	82	28	37	289	170	+119	55.78	
Hong Kong	(Hong Kong)	12 December 2025	Present	6	4	0	2	11	4	+7	66.67	
Career Total				153	86	28	39	300	174	+126	56.21	

== Honours ==
=== Player ===
Valladolid

- Segunda División: 2006–07

Kitchee

- Hong Kong First Division League: 2010–11, 2011–12
- Hong Kong FA Cup: 2011–12
- Hong Kong League Cup: 2011–12

Individual

- Hong Kong Footballer of the Year: 2010–11
- Hong Kong Team of the Season: 2010–11
- Hong Kong Most Popular Player: 2010–11

=== Manager ===
Eastern

- Hong Kong FA Cup: 2023–24, 2024–25
- Hong Kong Senior Shield: 2024–25

Hong Kong

- FIFA ASEAN Challenge Cup: 2026

Individual

- Hong Kong Coach of the Year: 2022–23, 2023–24, 2024–25
