= Xavier Chen =

Taiwanese footballer (born 1983)

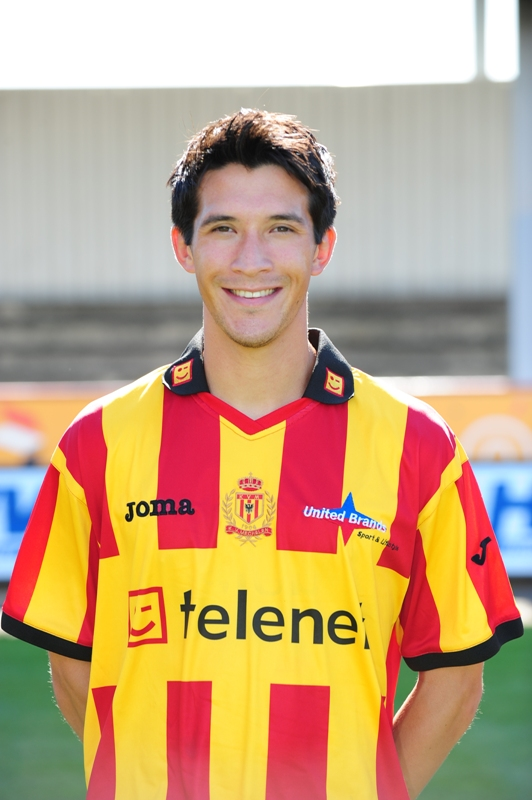
- Chen with KV Mechelen in 2010

Personal information
- Full name: Xiàwéiyé Chén
- Date of birth: 5 October 1983 (age 43)
- Place of birth: Berchem-Sainte-Agathe, Brussels, Belgium
- Height: 1.74 m (5 ft 9 in)
- Position: Right back

Youth career
- 1991–2003: Anderlecht
- 2003–2005: KV Kortrijk

Senior career*
Years	Team	Apps	(Gls)
2005–2007	KV Kortrijk	38	(0)
2007–2013	KV Mechelen	124	(0)
2013–2015	Guizhou Renhe	75	(2)
2016–2017	KV Mechelen	18	(0)
Total		255	(2)

International career
2001–2002	Belgium U19	11	(0)
2011–2017	Chinese Taipei	9	(3)
- * Club domestic league appearances and goals

Xavier Chen
- Traditional Chinese: 陳昌源
Transcriptions
Standard Mandarin
- Hanyu Pinyin: Xiàwéiyé Chén

Xavier Chen (Chinese: 陳昌源; pinyin: Xiàwéiyé Chén; born 5 October 1983) is a former professional footballer who played as a right-back. Born in Belgium, he played for the Chinese Taipei national team.

He began his youth career with Anderlecht before moving to KV Kortrijk where he first played at senior level (2003–2007). After Kortrijk, he spent six years at KV Mechelen (2007–2013) and two at Guizhou Renhe (2013–2015) before returning to KV Mechelen. Born in Belgium, Chen obtained Taiwanese citizenship in 2011 through naturalization and represents Chinese Taipei internationally.

== Early life ==
Chen was born on 5 October 1983 in Berchem-Sainte-Agathe, a municipality in the Brussels, to a French mother and a Taiwanese father. His paternal grandfather, a former diplomat, still lives in Taiwan.

== Club career ==
Chen started his senior career in KV Kortrijk, but gained recognition in his first stint with KV Mechelen, where he became captain. Due to the inconvenience of traveling back and forth between Belgium and Taiwan, Chen decided to move to Chinese side Guizhou Renhe when he accepted CTFA's invitation to play for the national team. In January 2016, Chen returned to KV Mechelen, stating that he only wanted to play for a maximum of three years in China. A few Chinese teams showed interest to sign him, but he ultimately decided to return to his country of birth. Altogether, Chen spent seven seasons with KV Mechelen.

== International career ==
Chen's eligibility to play for Chinese Taipei was discovered by the CTFA public relations director Chen Chia-Ming in 2009 and Chen was invited to play for the national team. The Chinese Football Association of the mainland had also made an attempt to recruit Chen three months after the CTFA did. On 24 May 2011, encouraged by his relatives, Chen elected to play for Chinese Taipei.

Chen made his international debut against Malaysia on 3 July 2011 and scored the winning goal. This marked the first time in 10 years that Chinese Taipei beat an opponent that was ranked in the FIFA top 150. The attendance of the game was a record breaking at 15,335, which was 10,000 higher than average. On 9 October 2015, Chen scored the third goal in a 5–1 victory over Macau.

== Career statistics ==
=== International ===
Appearances and goals by national team and year
National team	Year	Apps	Goals
Chinese Taipei	2011	1	1
Chinese Taipei	2015	5	1
Chinese Taipei	2016	1	0
Chinese Taipei	2017	2	1
Total		9	3

=== International goals ===
Scores and results list Taiwan's goal tally first, score column indicates score after each Chen goal.

List of international goals scored by Xavier Chen
No.	Date	Venue	Opponent	Score	Result	Competition
1	3 July 2011	Taipei Municipal Stadium, Taipei, Taiwan	Malaysia	3–2	3–2	2014 FIFA World Cup qualification
2	9 October 2015	Taipei Municipal Stadium, Taipei, Taiwan	Macau	3–1	5–1	Friendly
3	10 June 2017	Jalan Besar Stadium, Kallang, Singapore	Singapore	1–1	2–1	2019 AFC Asian Cup qualification

== Honours ==
Guizhou Renhe

- Chinese FA Cup: 2013
- Chinese FA Super Cup: 2014

== See also ==
- List of Republic of China international footballers born outside the Republic of China
