= List of Republic of China international footballers born outside the Republic of China =

This is the list of the Republic of China international footballers who are either naturalised or born outside the country before choosing to represent Chinese Taipei national football team.

== List of players ==
The following players:

1. have played at least one game for the full (senior male) Chinese Taipei international team; and
2. were born outside Chinese Taipei.

Player	Born	Origin	First cap	Last cap	Notes
Kwok Yau	1927	(China) Macau	1958	1966	
Yiu Cheuk Yin	1928	British Hong Kong	1954	1964	
Chan Fai Hung	1932	British Hong Kong	1960	1960	
Cheung Chi Doy	1941	British Hong Kong	1962	1971	
Wong Man-wai	1943	British Hong Kong	1960	1968	
Law Pak	1933	British Hong Kong	1958	1967	
Xavier Chen (Note: Chen was also capped for Belgium at youth level (2001–2002))	1983	(Belgium) Brussels	2011	2017	
Yoshitaka Komori	1987	(Japan) Yokohama	2021	TBD	
Onur Doğan	1988	(Turkey) Çanakkale	2014	TBD	
Yaki Yen	1989	(Spain) Puerto del Rosario	2015	2018	
Víctor Chou	1992	(Spain) Madrid	2009	2015	
William López	1993	(El Salvador) San Salvador	2024	TBD	
Wang Chien-ming	1993	(South Korea) Seogwipo	2018	TBD	
Tim Chow	1994	(England) Wigan	2024	2019	
Jhon Benchy (Note: Benchy was also capped for Haiti at youth level (2010–2015))	1994	(Haiti) Anse-à-Galets	2024	TBD	
Ange Kouamé	1996	(Ivory Coast) Abidjan	2023	TBD	
Emilio Estevez	1998	(Canada) Toronto	2019	TBD	
Will Donkin	2000	(England) Oxford	2017	TBD	
Tae-won Kang	2000	(South Korea) Seoul	2024	TBD	
Christopher Tiao	2001	(United States) Randolph	2024	TBD	
Miguel Sandberg	2002	(Sweden) Stockholm	2023	TBD	
Jason Hsu	2003	(United States) San Rafael	2026	TBD	

== See also ==
- EAFF international footballers born from countries other than their respective football nationalities
  - List of Chinese naturalized footballers
  - List of Japan international footballers born outside Japan
