= Kam Chi Kin =

Hong Kong footballer (born 2004)

Kam Chi Kin 甘智健
Personal information
- Full name: Jason Kam Chi Kin
- Date of birth: 6 March 2004 (age 22)
- Place of birth: Hong Kong
- Height: 1.92 m (6 ft 4 in)
- Position: Centre back

Team information
- Current team: Kitchee
- Number: 14

Youth career
- 2011–2022: Kitchee

Senior career*
Years	Team	Apps	(Gls)
2022–	Kitchee	26	(1)

International career^{‡}
2019	Hong Kong U16	1	(0)
2025–	Hong Kong U22	2	(0)
2026–	Hong Kong	5	(0)
Medal record
Men's football
Representing Hong Kong
FIFA ASEAN Challenge Cup
Winner	2026 Hong Kong
- * Club domestic league appearances and goals as of 21 November 2026 ‡ National team caps and goals as of 3 October 2026

Jason Kam Chi Kin (Chinese: 甘智健; born 6 March 2004) is a Hong Kong professional footballer who plays as a centre back for Hong Kong Premier League club Kitchee and the Hong Kong national team.

== Club career ==
=== Kitchee ===
On 23 September 2022, Kitchee signed a professional player contract with Kam.

On 12 November 2022, he made his first appearance for Kitchee in a league match against HK U23, substituting Cleiton in the 87th minute.

In the 2025–26 season, he became a key pillar of the squad, with regular playing time throughout the season. On 31 January 2026, he scored his first goal for Kitchee in a league match against Southern.

== International career ==
In September 2025, Kam was named in the Hong Kong U-22 squad for the 2026 AFC U-23 Asian Cup qualifiers.

In December 2025, he was selected to play in the 44th Guangdong–Hong Kong Cup.

On 31 March 2026, he made his international debut for Hong Kong in the 2027 AFC Asian Cup qualification match against India.

== Career statistics ==
=== International ===
As of 3 October 2026

National team	Year	Apps	Goals
Hong Kong	2026	5	0
Total		5	0

== Honours ==
Hong Kong

- FIFA ASEAN Challenge Cup: 2026
