= Wang Chien-ming (footballer) =

Taiwanese footballer (born 1993)

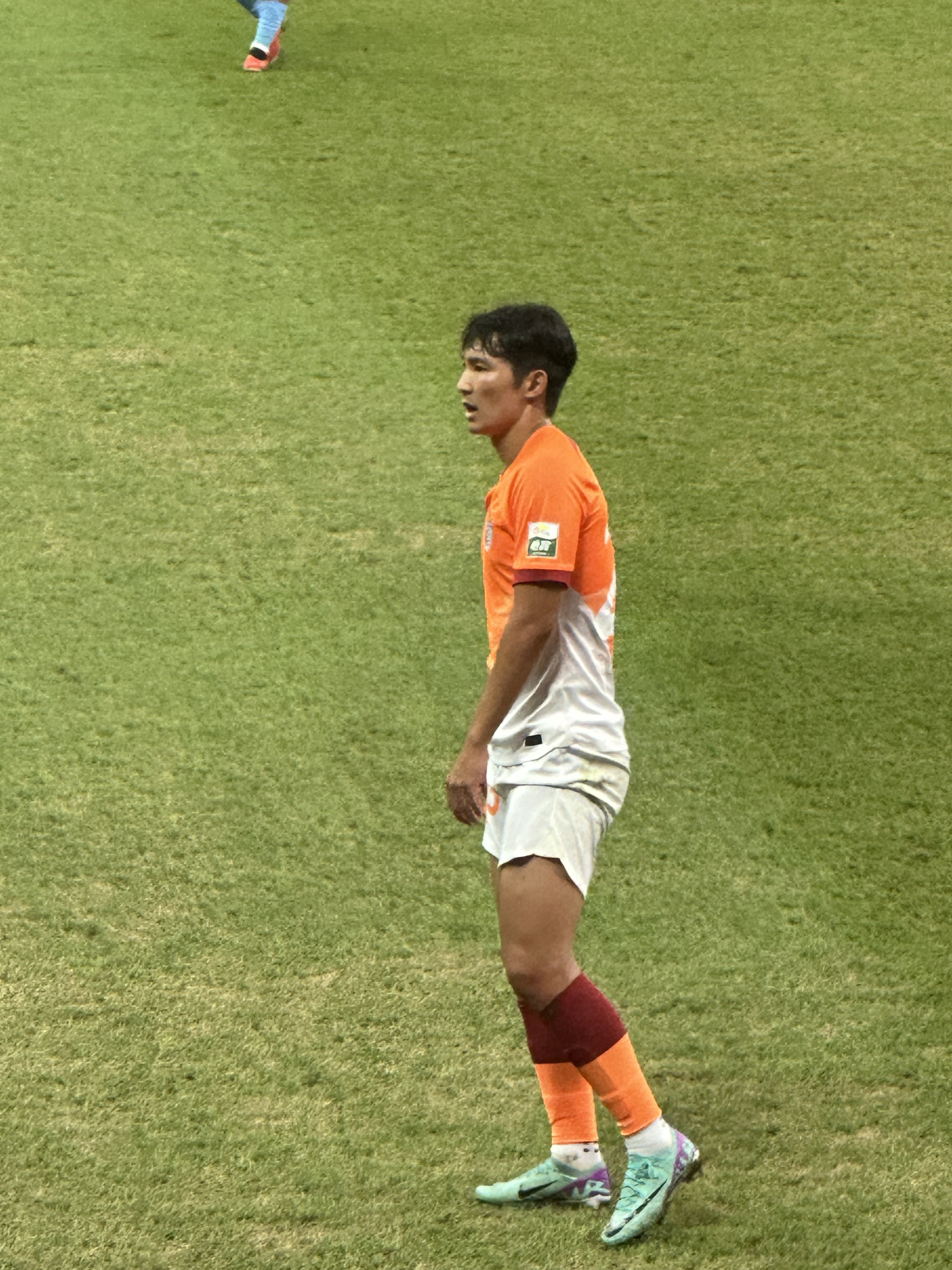
- Wang with Qingdao Hainiu in 2024

Personal information
- Date of birth: 4 July 1993 (age 33)
- Place of birth: Seogwipo, South Korea
- Height: 1.81 m (5 ft 11 in)
- Positions: Right-back; right wing-back

Team information
- Current team: Guangdong GZ-Power
- Number: 25

Youth career
- –2011: Jeju United
- 2012–2015: Dankook University

Senior career*
Years	Team	Apps	(Gls)
2016	Jeju United	0	(0)
2017–2018	Cheongju City	28	(4)
2018–2019	Gwangju	3	(0)
2020–2022	Shaanxi Chang'an Athletic	54	(4)
2022–2024	Qingdao Hainiu	75	(5)
2025–	Guangdong GZ-Power	33	(1)

International career^{‡}
2018–	Chinese Taipei	23	(0)
- * Club domestic league appearances and goals as of 13 June 2026 ‡ National team caps and goals as of 25 December 2024

- Wang Chien-ming
- Hangul: 왕건명
- Hanja: 王建明
- RR: Wang Geonmyeong
- MR: Wang Kŏnmyŏng

Wang Chien-ming (Chinese: 王建明; pinyin: Wáng Jiànmíng; Korean: 왕건명; born 4 July 1993) is a professional footballer who plays as a defender for China League One club Guangdong GZ-Power. Born in South Korea, he represents the Taiwan (Chinese Taipei national football team).

== Club career ==
=== Early career ===
Wang Chien-ming was born in Seogwipo, Jeju, South Korea to a Taiwanese father and Korean mother. While in the fourth grade of elementary school, he would join the Jeju United youth system before going to Dankook University to participate in college football. After he graduated, he would return to Jeju United. However, he did not make any appearances for Jeju United and joined fourth tier club Cheongju City before joining Gwangju in the second tier.

=== Shaanxi Chang'an Athletic ===
On 28 August 2020, after a series of training sessions, Wang would join China League One club Shaanxi Chang'an Athletic. Wang made his debut for Shaanxi on 13 September 2020 in a league match against Jiangxi Liansheng. On 3 June 2021, Wang scored his first league goal in a 2–2 draw against Zhejiang. Wang played a total of 56 matches and scored 4 goals in all competitions during his time with the Xi'an club.

=== Qingdao Hainiu ===
On 2 August 2022, after two years with Shaanxi, Wang joined fellow China League One club Qingdao Hainiu during the summer transfer window. Wang made his debut for Qingdao on 4 August 2022, in a league match against Shanghai Jiading in a 2–0 victory. He would go on to establish himself as a regular within the team that gained promotion to the top tier at the end of the 2022 China League One campaign.

Wang made his Chinese Super League debut on 16 April 2023 in a 2–1 away defeat against Shenzhen FC. He scored his first goal for Qingdao in a 5–0 home win against Shenzhen FC on 12 July 2023. Wang appeared regularly during the 2023 season and manage to help the Qingdao club avoid relegation from the top flight.

On 19 January 2025, Wang announced that he left the club after the 2024 season.

== International career ==
Although born in South Korea, Wang Chien-ming was eligible to play for Chinese Taipei through his grandfather. He would be selected for the squad for the 2019 AFC Asian Cup qualification – third round match against Singapore on 27 March 2018, however he could not play because there was still confusion about his grandfather who had a Republic of China passport rather than the newly named and relocated Taiwan passport. He would be eventually allowed to represent Chinese Taipei and would make his debut on 1 June 2018 against India in the 2018 Intercontinental Cup in match that ended in a 5–0 defeat.

== Career statistics ==
=== Club ===
As of 22 January 2025.

Club	Season	League			Cup		Continental		Other		Total	
Club	Season	Division	Apps	Goals	Apps	Goals	Apps	Goals	Apps	Goals	Apps	Goals
Jeju United	2016	K League Classic	0	0	0	0	-		-		0	0
Cheongju City	2017	K3 League Advanced	17	4	2	0	-		-		19	4
Cheongju City	2018	K3 League Advanced	11	0	1	0	-		-		12	0
Cheongju City	Total		28	4	3	0	0	0	0	0	31	4
Gwangju	2018	K League 2	3	0	0	0	-		-		3	0
Gwangju	2019	K League 2	0	0	0	0	-		-		0	0
Gwangju	Total		3	0	0	0	0	0	0	0	3	0
Shaanxi Chang'an Athletic	2020	China League One	13	1	0	0	-		-		13	1
Shaanxi Chang'an Athletic	2021	China League One	32	1	2	0	-		-		34	1
Shaanxi Chang'an Athletic	2022	China League One	9	2	0	0	-		-		9	2
Shaanxi Chang'an Athletic	Total		54	4	2	0	0	0	0	0	56	4
Qingdao Hainiu	2022	China League One	20	0	1	0	-		-		21	0
Qingdao Hainiu	2023	Chinese Super League	27	2	2	0	-		-		29	2
Qingdao Hainiu	2024	Chinese Super League	28	3	1	0	-		-		29	3
Qingdao Hainiu	Total		75	5	4	0	0	0	0	0	79	5
Guangdong GZ-Power	2025	China League One	0	0	0	0	-		-		0	0
Guangdong GZ-Power	Total		0	0	0	0	0	0	0	0	0	0
Career total			160	13	9	0	0	0	0	0	169	13

=== International ===
As of matches played 25 December 2024.

National team	Year	Apps	Goals
Chinese Taipei	2018	7	0
Chinese Taipei	2019	4	0
Chinese Taipei	2023	6	0
Chinese Taipei	2024	6	0
Total		23	0

== Honours ==
=== Club ===
Guangdong GZ-Power

- China League One: 2026

== See also ==
- List of Republic of China international footballers born outside the Republic of China
