= Will Donkin =

Taiwanese footballer (born 2000)

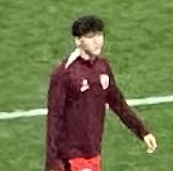
- Donkin in May 2025

Personal information
- Full name: William Rupert James Donkin
- Date of birth: 26 December 2000 (age 25)
- Place of birth: Oxford, England
- Height: 1.80 m (5 ft 11 in)
- Position: Winger

Youth career
- 2009–2011: Barnet
- 2012–2017: Chelsea
- 2017–2019: Crystal Palace

Senior career*
Years	Team	Apps	(Gls)
2019	Crystal Palace	0	(0)
2019–2020	Stabæk	0	(0)
2020–2021	Balzan	3	(0)
2021	→ Mosta (loan)	5	(1)
2021–2022	Mosta	27	(5)
2022–2023	Shenzhen FC	27	(2)
2024–2025	Shanghai Port	6	(0)
2025	Wuhan Three Towns	11	(0)

International career^{‡}
2018	Chinese Taipei U19	3	(0)
2017–	Chinese Taipei	19	(0)
- * Club domestic league appearances and goals as of 28 August 2025 ‡ National team caps and goals as of 19 November 2019

William Rupert James Donkin (Chinese: 沈子貴; pinyin: Shěn Zǐguì, born 26 December 2000) is a professional footballer who plays as a winger. Born in England, he represents the Chinese Taipei national team.

== Career ==
Donkin was born in Oxford to an English father and a Taiwanese mother. He lived in Amsterdam at a young age. He went to school at Eton College and played for the school Association 1st XI at the age of only fifteen. During his time at Eton he represented England Independent Schools (ISFA) at Under-14, Under-15 and Under-16 level.

At the age of nine he was scouted by Barnet's academy, before signing for Chelsea at the age of eleven. He played for the Chelsea Academy for five years, winning numerous honours including the Premier League Under-15 International Tournament where he scored in the final during a 2–1 victory over Manchester City.

In March 2017, he was signed by Crystal Palace to play in their Under-18 team, where he helped the side win the southern league in his first season. On 28 September 2019, he signed for Stabæk Fotball in the Norwegian Eliteserien, although he was ineligible to play for the first team until 1 January 2020.

In September 2020, Donkin joined Maltese Premier League side Balzan on a one-year deal. After making only three substitute appearances for Balzan, Donkin was loaned to fellow Maltese Premier League side Mosta until the end of the season. On 6 March 2021, Donkin scored his first professional goal in a 5–1 victory over Senglea Athletic.

On 31 August 2022, Donkin completed a move to Chinese Super League side Shenzhen FC. The club was dissolved in January 2024.

On 12 February 2024, Donkin joined fellow Chinese Super League club Shanghai Port.

On 17 July 2025, Donkin transferred to another Chinese Super League club Wuhan Three Towns. On 5 January 2026, the club announced his departure after the 2025 season.

== International career ==
=== Youth ===
On 7 October 2018, he was named in the under-19 side for the 2018 AFC U-19 Championship. He played every minute of Chinese Taipei's campaign at the tournament, which ended with them eliminated in last place in their group.

=== Senior ===
In October 2017 it emerged that Taiwan head coach Gary White was seeking European based players with Taiwanese heritage to represent the team, having also called up Ross County midfielder Tim Chow. In November, it was announced that Donkin had also been called up after impressing for the national under-19 team during training. He made his debut at the age of 16 as an 85th-minute substitute but could not prevent Taiwan from being eliminated from Asian Cup qualification at the hands of Turkmenistan. He returned to the national team in December for the 2017 CTFA International Tournament, earning plaudits as he appeared from the bench in all 3 games, overall assisting 2 goals and hitting the crossbar in his performances.

In November 2018, he was named in the Chinese Taipei side for the 2019 EAFF E-1 Football Championship second round.

Taiwanese fans have nicknamed Donkin "Doughtnut Boy" due to how his surname translates into Mandarin.

== Career statistics ==
=== Club appearances ===
As of 31 December 2022.

Appearances and goals by club, season and competition
Club	Season	League			Cup		Continental		Other		Total	
Club	Season	Division	Apps	Goals	Apps	Goals	Apps	Goals	Apps	Goals	Apps	Goals
Stabæk	2020	Eliteserien	0	0	-		-		-		0	0
Balzan	2020-21	Maltese Premier League	3	0	0	0	-		-		3	0
Mosta (Loan)	2020-21	Maltese Premier League	5	1	0	0	-		-		5	1
Mosta	2021-22	Maltese Premier League	27	5	2	3	2	0	-		31	8
Shenzhen FC	2022	Chinese Super League	3	0	0	0	-		-		3	0
Career total			38	6	2	3	2	0	0	0	42	9

=== International appearances ===
As of 19 November 2019

Appearances and goals by national team and year
National team	Year	Apps	Goals
Chinese Taipei	2017	4	0
Chinese Taipei	2018	7	0
Chinese Taipei	2019	8	0
Chinese Taipei	Total	18	0

== Honours ==
Shanghai Port

- Chinese Super League: 2024, 2025
- Chinese FA Cup: 2024

== See also ==
- List of Republic of China international footballers born outside the Republic of China
