= Emilio Estevez (footballer) =

Taiwanese footballer (born 1998)

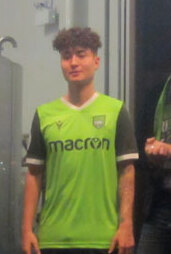
- Estevez with York9 in 2019

Personal information
- Full name: Emilio Estevez Tsai
- Date of birth: 10 August 1998 (age 28)
- Place of birth: Toronto, Ontario, Canada
- Height: 1.71 m (5 ft 7 in)
- Position: Midfielder

Team information
- Current team: Tai Po
- Number: 23

Youth career
- Etobicoke YSC
- 2013–2016: Clarkson SC
- 2016–2017: Levante
- 2020–2021: ADO Den Haag

College career
Years	Team	Apps	(Gls)
2017	Sheridan Bruins	7	(1)

Senior career*
Years	Team	Apps	(Gls)
2018	North Mississauga SC	8	(0)
2018	SC Waterloo Region	5	(1)
2019–2020	York9	18	(1)
2020–2021	ADO Den Haag	0	(0)
2021	Ourense CF	0	(0)
2022–2023	Eastern	13	(1)
2023–2024	Rangers (HKG)	0	(0)
2023–2024	→ Tai Po (loan)	10	(1)
2024–2025	Hang Yuan	4	(1)
2025–2026	Tanjong Pagar United	16	(3)
2026–	Tai Po	3	(2)

International career^{‡}
2019–	Chinese Taipei	19	(0)
- * Club domestic league appearances and goals as of 8 November 2026 ‡ National team caps and goals as of 13 November 2026

Emilio Estevez Tsai (Chinese: 蔡立靖; pinyin: Tsai Li-ching; born 10 August 1998) is a professional footballer who currently plays as a midfielder for Hong Kong Premier League club Tai Po. Born in Canada, he plays for the Chinese Taipei national team.

== Early life ==
Estevez began playing youth soccer with the Etobicoke YSC before switching to Clarkson SC in Mississauga as well as playing futsal. In 2016, when he was 18, he spent a year training with the lower teams of La Liga club Levante. He then spent a week on trial with Queen's Park Rangers before returning to Canada.

In 2017, he attended Sheridan College, making seven appearances and scoring one goal for the Bruins.

== Club career ==
=== Canada ===
In 2018, Estevez played for League1 Ontario side North Mississauga SC, making eight appearances in league play. He also played in the Canadian Soccer League with SC Waterloo Region.

In October 2018, Estevez participated in the Canadian Premier League Open Trials in Toronto, where he was highly rated by scouts. On 8 February 2019, Estevez signed with CPL side York9. On 4 May 2019, he made his professional debut as a starter in a match against Cavalry FC and assisted York's lone goal in a 2–1 loss. Estevez scored his first goal for York on 27 July against HFX Wanderers, netting the final goal in a 6–2 victory. On 10 December 2019, it was announced that Estevez had re-signed for the upcoming season.

=== Europe ===
On 12 May 2020, he moved to Dutch Eredivisie club ADO Den Haag in a transfer for an initial fee in the range of $100,000 CAD, plus add-ons and a sell-on clause. He agreed to a one-year contract with the club, with an option to extend for a further year. Estevez became the first player to move from the Canadian Premier League to a top-flight club in Europe, and was to be the first ever Taiwanese player to ply his trade in the Dutch Eredivisie, and the third overall to play in a top European League. He made his first appearance in a pre-season friendly against Almere City on 8 August, playing the second half. Initially joining the first team, he was moved to begin the season with the U21 side. On 29 January 2021, he and the club agreed to terminate his contract by mutual consent, after he appeared in only two substitute appearances for the U21 side.

In 2021, he joined Ourense CF, playing in the Spanish fourth tier Tercera División. After departing Spain, he returned to Canada and trained (but did not sign) with his former club York United FC (who had since changed their name from York9 FC).

=== Asia ===
In the summer of 2022, he trained with China League One side Guangxi Pingguo.

In October 2022, Estevez signed a contract with Hong Kong Premier League club Eastern. He made his debut on 16 October 2022 against Resources Capital. He scored his first goal on 23 October 2022 in a 3–1 Hong Kong Senior Challenge Shield match, also against Resources Capital. He scored his first league goal in a match against Sham Shui Po on 29 October 2022. In the summer of 2023, the club announced his departure.

On 24 August 2023, Estevez joined league rivals Rangers. Immediately after, on 25 August 2023, it was announced that Estevez was loaned to Tai Po for a season. Following his departure from the Hong Kong circuit, he joined Hang Yuan in the Taiwan Football Premier League in July 2024.

In July 2025, Estevez signed with Singapore Premier League club Tanjong Pagar United, becoming the first Taiwanese player to play in the league.

On 30 August 2026, Estevez returned to Tai Po after 2 years.

== International career ==
Born in Toronto to a Spanish father and a Taiwanese Hakka mother, Estevez was eligible to represent Canada, Chinese Taipei, or Spain internationally.

In 2018, Estevez was invited to train with the Chinese Taipei national team. In February 2019, shortly after signing for York9, Estevez received another call-up from Chinese Taipei for a friendly against the Solomon Islands, but did not appear in the match due to injury. He made his debut as a starter in their loss to Australia during 2022 FIFA World Cup qualification on 15 October 2019.

He returned to the national team program in the summer of 2023, to face Thailand in a friendly match.

== Personal life ==
Despite the similarity in name to actor Emilio Estevez, he was actually named after former Real Madrid player Emilio Butragueño.

== Career statistics ==
=== Club ===
As of 26 May 2024

Club Statistics
Club	Season	League			National Cup (Note: Appearance(s) in the Canadian Championship and Hong Kong FA Cup)		League Cup (Note: Appearance(s) in the Hong Kong Senior Challenge Shield)		Other (Note: Appearance(s) in the Hong Kong Sapling Cup)		Total	
Club	Season	Division	Apps	Goals	Apps	Goals	Apps	Goals	Apps	Goals	Apps	Goals
North Mississauga SC	2018	League1 Ontario	8	0	—		?	?	—		8	0
SC Waterloo Region	2018	Canadian Soccer League	5	1	—		—		?	?	5	1
York9 FC	2019	Canadian Premier League	18	1	3	0	—		—		21	1
ADO Den Haag	2020–21	Eredivisie	0	0	0	0	—		—		0	0
Ourense CF	2020–21	Tercera División	0	0	0	0	—		0	0	0	0
Eastern	2022–23	Hong Kong Premier League	13	1	2	0	3	1	6	0	24	2
Rangers (HKG)	2023–24	Hong Kong Premier League	0	0	0	0	0	0	0	0	0	0
Tai Po (loan)	2023–24	Hong Kong Premier League	10	1	1	0	1	0	9	0	21	1
Career totals			54	4	6	1	4	1	15	0	79	6

== See also ==
- List of Republic of China international footballers born outside the Republic of China
