= Han Xuan (footballer, born 1995) =

Chinese association football player

Personal information
- Date of birth: 13 January 1995 (age 31)
- Place of birth: Maoping, Hubei, China
- Height: 1.85 m (6 ft 1 in)
- Position: Central defender

Team information
- Current team: Guangdong GZ-Power
- Number: 3

Youth career
- 2005–2013: Wuhan Football School
- 2013–2014: Wuhan Zall

Senior career*
Years	Team	Apps	(Gls)
2014–2018	Wuhan Zall	22	(1)
2019–2021	Shaanxi Chang'an Athletic	30	(1)
2022	Wuhan Yangtze River	13	(0)
2023	Qingdao West Coast	6	(0)
2023	Qingdao Red Lions (loan)	9	(1)
2024–	Guangdong GZ-Power	41	(3)

International career
2014	China U20	1	(0)
- * Club domestic league appearances and goals as of 14:01, 1 January 2026 (UTC)

Han Xuan (Chinese: 韩轩; born 13 January 1995) is a Chinese footballer currently playing as a central defender for Chinese League One club Guangdong GZ-Power.

== Club career ==
As a youth player, Han Xuan was the captain of the Maoping Primary School football team before being selected for the Wuhan Football School in 2005. He was selected by the Hubei Football Association to represent the Hubei U-18 youth team that won the bronze medal at the 2013 National Games of China. After this he joined the youth team of Wuhan Zall and was promoted to their senior team 2014 league campaign. In the following season he would score his first career goal in a league game on 8 August 2015 against Hunan Billows in a 2-1 victory.

After five seasons with Wuhan, Han did not make any league appearances for the team as they were promoted to the top tier at the end of the 2018 league campaign. On 15 March 2019, Han transferred to second tier club Shaanxi Chang'an Athletic. After three seasons with Shaanxi, Han rejoined his former club on 30 March 2022. He made his top tier debut against Guangzhou on 4 September 2022 in a 2-1 victory.

== Career statistics ==
=== Club ===
As of 1 January 2026.

Club	Season	League			Cup		Continental		Other		Total	
Club	Season	Division	Apps	Goals	Apps	Goals	Apps	Goals	Apps	Goals	Apps	Goals
Wuhan Zall	2014	China League One	4	0	0	0	–		0	0	4	0
Wuhan Zall	2015	China League One	5	1	0	0	–		0	0	5	1
Wuhan Zall	2016	China League One	9	0	0	0	–		0	0	9	0
Wuhan Zall	2017	China League One	4	0	1 (Note: Appearances in the Chinese FA Cup)	0	–		0	0	5	0
Wuhan Zall	2018	China League One	0	0	1	0	–		0	0	1	0
Wuhan Zall	Total		22	1	2	0	0	0	0	0	24	1
Shaanxi Chang'an Athletic	2019	China League One	22	1	0	0	–		0	0	22	1
Shaanxi Chang'an Athletic	2020	China League One	1	0	0	0	–		0	0	1	0
Shaanxi Chang'an Athletic	2021	China League One	7	0	2	0	–		0	0	9	0
Shaanxi Chang'an Athletic	Total		30	1	2	0	0	0	0	0	32	1
Wuhan Yangtze River	2022	Chinese Super League	13	0	0	0	–		0	0	13	0
Qingdao West Coast	2023	China League One	6	0	3	0	–		0	0	9	0
Qingdao Red Lions (loan)	2023	China League Two	9	1	0	0	–		0	0	9	1
Guangdong GZ-Power	2024	China League Two	23	2	–		–		0	0	23	2
Guangdong GZ-Power	2025	China League One	18	1	3	0	–		0	0	21	1
Guangdong GZ-Power	Total		41	3	3	0	0	0	0	0	44	3
Career total			121	6	10	0	0	0	0	0	131	6

== Honours ==
Guangdong GZ-Power

- China League Two: 2024
- China League One: 2026
