= Hou Yu (footballer, born 2001) =

Chinese association football player

Personal information
- Date of birth: 31 January 2001 (age 25)
- Place of birth: Meizhou, Guangdong, China
- Height: 1.80 m (5 ft 11 in)
- Position: Midfielder

Team information
- Current team: Guangdong GZ-Power
- Number: 34

Youth career
- –2020: Guangzhou Evergrande

Senior career*
| Years | Team | Apps | (Gls) |
| 2020–2024 | Guangzhou FC | 78 | (6) |
| 2020 | → China U19 (loan) | 6 | (0) |
| 2021 | → China U20 (loan) | 9 | (1) |
| 2025– | Guangdong GZ-Power | 0 | (0) |

International career
| 2018 | China U17 | 5 | (0) |
| 2019 | China U19 | 1 | (0) |
- * Club domestic league appearances and goals as of 26 March 2024

Hou Yu (Chinese: 侯煜; born 31 January 2001) is a Chinese professional footballer who plays as a midfielder for China League One club Guangdong GZ-Power.

== Club career ==
Yu played for the Guangzhou FC youth team before being promoted and loaned out to the China U-19 team who were allowed to participate in the Chinese pyramid in the 2020 China League Two campaign. The following campaign he was loaned out again, this time to the China U-20 team who were allowed to participate in the Chinese pyramid in the 2021 China League Two campaign. Before the 2021 Chinese Super League campaign ended, he returned to Guangzhou where he made his senior debut for the team in a league game on 13 December 2021 against Beijing Guoan F.C. in a 1–0 defeat.

In the 2022 Chinese Super League with Guangzhou he went on to establish himself as a regular within the club. However, the majority shareholder of the club experienced financial trouble and Guangzhou started to lose several key players. The team was then relegated from the top tier, ending their twelve-season stay in the top flight. Yu remained with the team and go on to establish himself as a regular within the club as he helped guide them to a twelfth-placed finish.

== Career statistics ==
As of match played 31 December 2025.

Appearances and goals by club, season and competition
| Club | Season | League | | | Cup | | Continental | | Other | | Total | |
| Club | Season | Division | Apps | Goals | Apps | Goals | Apps | Goals | Apps | Goals | Apps | Goals |
|---|---|---|---|---|---|---|---|---|---|---|---|---|
| Guangzhou FC | 2021 | Chinese Super League | 7 | 0 | 0 | 0 | 0 (Note: Appearances in the AFC Champions League) | 0 | – | | 7 | 0 |
| Guangzhou FC | 2022 | Chinese Super League | 17 | 0 | 2 | 0 | 0 | 0 | – | | 19 | 0 |
| Guangzhou FC | 2023 | China League One | 26 | 2 | 1 | 0 | – | | – | | 27 | 2 |
| Guangzhou FC | 2024 | China League One | 28 | 4 | 1 | 0 | – | | – | | 29 | 4 |
| Guangzhou FC | Total | | 78 | 6 | 4 | 0 | 0 | 0 | 0 | 0 | 82 | 3 |
| China U19 (loan) | 2020 | China League Two | 6 | 0 | 0 | 0 | – | | – | | 6 | 0 |
| China U20 (loan) | 2021 | China League Two | 9 | 1 | 1 | 0 | – | | – | | 10 | 1 |
| Guangdong GZ-Power | 2025 | China League One | 27 | 1 | 3 | 0 | – | | – | | 30 | 1 |
| Guangdong GZ-Power | 2026 | China League One | 0 | 0 | 0 | 0 | – | | – | | 0 | 0 |
| Guangdong GZ-Power | Total | | 27 | 1 | 3 | 0 | 0 | 0 | 0 | 0 | 30 | 1 |
| Career total | | | 120 | 8 | 8 | 0 | 0 | 0 | 0 | 0 | 128 | 8 |

== Honours ==
=== Club ===
Guangdong GZ-Power

- China League One: 2026
