= Yi Xianlong =

Chinese association football player

Personal information
- Date of birth: 3 March 2001 (age 25)
- Place of birth: Ganzhou, Jiangxi, China
- Height: 1.71 m (5 ft 7 in)
- Position: Midfielder

Team information
- Current team: Wuxi Wugo
- Number: 37

Youth career
- 2012–2020: Shandong Luneng

Senior career*
Years	Team	Apps	(Gls)
2020–2024	Shandong Taishan	1	(0)
2020	→ Jiangxi Beidamen (loan)	13	(1)
2021	→ China U20 (loan)	12	(1)
2021	→ Zhejiang FC (loan)	14	(2)
2023	→ Ji'nan Xingzhou (loan)	25	(4)
2024	→ Guangxi Pingguo Haliao (loan)	22	(3)
2025	Meizhou Hakka	4	(0)
2026–	Wuxi Wugo	0	(0)

International career
2022	China U-21	1	(0)
- * Club domestic league appearances and goals as of 28 August 2025

Yi Xianlong (Chinese: 易县龙; born 3 March 2001) is a Chinese footballer currently playing as a midfielder for Wuxi Wugo.

== Club career ==
In 2020 Yi Xianlong would be promoted to the senior team of Shandong Taishan before he would be loaned out to second tier club Jiangxi Beidamen, where he would make his debut in a league game on 13 September 2020 against Shaanxi Chang'an Athletic that ended in a 1-1 draw. This would be followed by his first goal of his career on 26 September 2020 in a league game against Guizhou Hengfeng that ended in a 3-1 defeat. The following season he would be loaned out to the China U20 who were allowed to participle within the 2021 China League Two division and then second tier club, Zhejiang Professional where he would aid the club in gaining promotion to the top tier at the end of the 2021 campaign.

On his return to Shandong for the 2022 campaign, Yi would be included in a youth team squad to participate in the 2022 AFC Champions League as the senior team were unable to participate, due to the strict Chinese COVID-19 quarantine regulations. This would see Yi make his first appearance for Shandong in the 2022 AFC Champions League on 15 April 2022 against Daegu FC in a 7-0 defeat.

== Career statistics ==
As of 31 January 2023.

Club	Season	League			Cup		Continental		Other		Total	
Club	Season	Division	Apps	Goals	Apps	Goals	Apps	Goals	Apps	Goals	Apps	Goals
Shandong Taishan	2020	Chinese Super League	0	0	0	0	–		–		0	0
Shandong Taishan	2021	Chinese Super League	0	0	0	0	–		–		0	0
Shandong Taishan	2022	Chinese Super League	1	0	0	0	6	0	–		7	0
Shandong Taishan	Total		1	0	0	0	0	0	0	0	1	0
Jiangxi Beidamen (loan)	2020	China League One	13	1	0	0	–		1 (Note: Appearances in the China League One playoffs)	0	14	1
China U20 (loan)	2021	China League Two	12	1	1	1	–		–		13	2
Zhejiang Professional (loan)	2021	China League One	14	2	2	0	–		1 (Note: Appearance(s) in CSL Relegation play-offs)	0	17	2
Career total			40	4	3	1	6	0	2	0	51	1
