= 2027 Chinese FA Super Cup =

Dalian Yingbo
- Date: 21 February 2027
- Venue: Wuxi Olympic Sports Centre, Wuxi

The 2027 Chinese FA Super Cup (Chinese: 2027中国足球协会超级杯) will be the 22nd Chinese FA Super Cup, an annual football match contested by the winners of the previous season's Chinese Super League and FA Cup competitions. The match will be played between Dalian Yingbo, champions of the 2026 Chinese Super League and the winner of the 2026 Chinese FA Cup.

== Match ==
=== Details ===
21 February 2026
--:-- UTC+8

Dalian Yingbo	–

Wuxi Olympic Sports Centre, Wuxi
