= Michael Udebuluzor =

Hong Kong footballer (born 2004)

Michael Udebuluzor 米高
Personal information
- Full name: Michael Chibuikem Udebuluzor
- Date of birth: 1 April 2004 (age 22)
- Place of birth: Hong Kong
- Height: 1.88 m (6 ft 2 in)
- Position: Striker

Team information
- Current team: Lee Man
- Number: 99

Youth career
- 2016–2018: Kitchee
- 2018–2020: DFI Bad Aibling
- 2020–2022: Ingolstadt 04

Senior career*
Years	Team	Apps	(Gls)
2022–2024	Ingolstadt 04 II	23	(14)
2022–2024	Ingolstadt 04	3	(0)
2024–2025	VfR Mannheim	20	(4)
2025	Suzhou Dongwu	0	(0)
2025	Tallinna Kalev	10	(1)
2026–	Lee Man	4	(0)

International career^{‡}
2025	Hong Kong U22	2	(1)
2026–	Hong Kong U23	3	(0)
2023–	Hong Kong	21	(2)
- * Club domestic league appearances and goals as of 20 November 2026 ‡ National team caps and goals as of 23 September 2026

Michael Chibuikem Udebuluzor (Chinese: 米高; born 1 April 2004) is a Hong Kong professional footballer who currently plays as a striker for Hong Kong Premier League club Lee Man and the Hong Kong national team.

== Club career ==
=== FC Ingolstadt 04 ===
In July 2022, Udebuluzor debuted for Ingolstadt 04 II. On 6 August 2023, Udebuluzor made his first team debut for Ingolstadt 04 in 3. Liga against FC Erzgebirge Aue.

=== Mannheim ===
On 17 August 2024, Udebuluzor signed for Oberliga Baden-Württemberg club VfR Mannheim.

=== Suzhou Dongwu ===
In July 2025, Udebuluzor joined China League One club Suzhou Dongwu. However, his contract was terminated following his controversial speech against Chinese fans during the Final Round of EAFF E-1 Football Championship.

=== Tallinna Kalev ===
On 27 August 2025, Udebuluzor joined Meistriliiga club Tallinna Kalev.

=== Lee Man ===
On 6 July 2026, Udebuluzor returned to Hong Kong and joined Lee Man.

== International career ==
On 8 September 2023, it was announced that Udebuluzor had received his HKSAR passport after renouncing his Nigerian citizenship, making him eligible to represent Hong Kong internationally.

On 11 September 2023, Udebuluzor made his international debut for Hong Kong in a friendly match against Brunei. On 12 October 2023, he scored his first international goal in a game against Bhutan, scoring a brace in the match.

On 26 December 2023, Udebuluzor was named in Hong Kong's squad for the 2023 AFC Asian Cup.

== Personal life ==
Udebuluzor is the son of former Nigerian professional footballer Cornelius Udebuluzor. He was born while his father was playing for Rangers in the Hong Kong First Division League.

== Career statistics ==
=== International ===
As of 18 November 2025

National team	Year	Apps	Goals
Hong Kong	2023	5	2
Hong Kong	2024	9	0
Hong Kong	2025	7	0
Total		21	2

#	Date	Venue	Opponent	Result	Competition
1	11 September 2023	Hong Kong Stadium, So Kon Po, Hong Kong	Brunei	10–0	Friendly
2	12 October 2023	Hong Kong Stadium, So Kon Po, Hong Kong	Bhutan	4–0	2026 FIFA World Cup qualification – AFC first round
3	17 October 2023	Changlimithang Stadium, Thimphu, Bhutan	Bhutan	0–2	2026 FIFA World Cup qualification – AFC first round
4	16 November 2023	Azadi Stadium, Tehran, Iran	Iran	0–4	2026 FIFA World Cup qualification – AFC second round
5	21 November 2023	Hong Kong Stadium, So Kon Po, Hong Kong	Turkmenistan	2–2	2026 FIFA World Cup qualification – AFC second round
6	14 January 2024	Khalifa International Stadium, Al Rayyan, Qatar	United Arab Emirates	1–3	2023 AFC Asian Cup
7	19 January 2024	Khalifa International Stadium, Al Rayyan, Qatar	Iran	0–1	2023 AFC Asian Cup
8	23 January 2024	Abdullah bin Khalifa Stadium, Doha, Qatar	Palestine	0–3	2023 AFC Asian Cup
9	21 March 2024	Mong Kok Stadium, Mong Kok, Hong Kong	Uzbekistan	0–2	2026 FIFA World Cup qualification – AFC second round
10	26 March 2024	Milliy Stadium, Tashkent, Uzbekistan	Uzbekistan	0–3	2026 FIFA World Cup qualification – AFC second round
11	6 June 2024	Hong Kong Stadium, So Kon Po, Hong Kong	Iran	2–4	2026 FIFA World Cup qualification – AFC second round
12	11 June 2024	Ashgabat Stadium, Ashgabat, Turkmenistan	Turkmenistan	0–0	2026 FIFA World Cup qualification – AFC second round
13	8 September 2024	Churchill Park, Lautoka, Fiji	Fiji	1–1	Friendly
14	15 October 2024	Hong Kong Stadium, So Kon Po, Hong Kong	Cambodia	3–0	Friendly
15	5 June 2025	Hong Kong Stadium, So Kon Po, Hong Kong	Nepal	0–0	Friendly
16	10 June 2025	Kai Tak Stadium, Kai Tak, Hong Kong	India	0–0	2027 AFC Asian Cup qualification
17	8 July 2025	Yongin Mireu Stadium, Yongin, South Korea	Japan	1–6	2025 EAFF E-1 Football Championship
18	11 July 2025	Yongin Mireu Stadium, Yongin, South Korea	South Korea	0–2	2025 EAFF E-1 Football Championship

=== International goals ===
No.	Date	Venue	Opponent	Score	Result	Competition
1.	12 October 2023	Hong Kong Stadium, So Kon Po, Hong Kong	Bhutan	1–0	4–0	2026 FIFA World Cup qualification
2	12 October 2023	Hong Kong Stadium, So Kon Po, Hong Kong	Bhutan	2–0	4–0	2026 FIFA World Cup qualification
