= Zhang Xiaorui =

Chinese footballer and manager

Zhang Xiaorui 张效瑞
Personal information
- Full name: Zhang Xiaorui
- Date of birth: March 5, 1976 (age 50)
- Place of birth: Tianjin, China
- Height: 1.77 m (5 ft 10 in)
- Position: Midfielder

Team information
- Current team: Lanzhou Longyuan Athletic (head coach)

Youth career
- 1993–1998: Jianlibao Youth

Senior career*
Years	Team	Apps	(Gls)
1999–2004	Tianjin Teda	78	(7)
2001	→ Alemannia Aachen (loan)	5	(0)
2005–2006	Shanghai Zobon	46	(6)
2007	Shanghai Shenhua	6	(0)
2008	Tianjin Tuanbo New City	16	(2)

International career^{‡}
1997	China U-20		
1997–2001	China	12	(1)

Managerial career
- 2008–2010: Tianjin Tuanbo New City
- 2012: Tianjin Teda U-19
- 2013: Tianjin Songjiang (caretaker)
- 2020: Shenzhen FC
- 2021: Shenzhen FC (caretaker)
- 2022: Shenzhen FC (caretaker)
- 2025: Foshan Nanshi
- 2026: Meizhou Hakka (caretaker)
- 2026–: Lanzhou Longyuan Athletic
- * Club domestic league appearances and goals as of 6 Feb 2012 ‡ National team caps and goals as of 6 Feb 2012

Zhang Xiaorui (simplified Chinese: 张效瑞; traditional Chinese: 張效瑞; pinyin: Zhāng Xiàoruì; born March 5, 1976, in Tianjin) is a Chinese football coach and a former professional player.

He used to play for Tianjin Teda, Alemannia Aachen, Shanghai Zobon and Shanghai Shenhua. His first management assignment was with third-tier club Tianjin Tuanbo New City where he was initially brought in as a player-manager before leaving the club at the end of the 2009 Chinese league season.

== Club career ==
=== Early career ===
Like many promising young Chinese players Zhang Xiaorui was selected for a national youth development initiative that sent players abroad to train in Brazil for a five-year training programme sponsored by Jianlibao and called the Chinese Jianlibao Youth Football Team. After graduating from the Jianlibao Youth Team, Zhang joined Tianjin Teda to start his professional football career. He quickly established himself as a key member of the squad and was named Young Player of the Year at the conclusion of the 1999 league season.

=== Alemannia Aachen ===
He would attract the interests of German side Alemannia Aachen and play in the 2. Fußball-Bundesliga during 2001 as part of a loan deal. He, however found it difficult to establish himself within the team and would only make five league appearances before he returned to Tianjin Teda F.C. His return to China however saw his performances fluctuate due to injury the club allowed him to leave at the end of the 2004 league season.

=== Move to Shanghai ===
Attempting to resurrect his career he would join Shanghai Zobon in 2005 where he showed some of the skill and consistency that was missing from his performances. By his next season with the club he had become an integral member of the team (now known as Shanghai United) and help them to a mid-table finish. The 2007 league season, however saw Shanghai Shenhua merge with the club and Zhang Xiaorui would lose his place within the enlarged squad. In 2008, he was hired to be a player-manager of Chinese Yi League club Tianjin Tuanbo New City, where he would gradually move away from playing before he would officially retire as a player in 2009.

== International career ==
Zhang Xiaorui was part of the Jianlibao Youth and Chinese U-20 team that studied abroad and were fast-tracked by the Chinese Head coach Qi Wusheng who included him in the squad in a friendly against USA on January 29, 1997, in a game that China won 2-1. After making his senior debut he would go on to play for the Chinese U-20 team that took part in the 1997 FIFA World Youth Championship and once the tournament finished he was one of several players that would graduate from the Chinese Jianlibao Youth Football Team to the senior team along with Li Jinyu, Li Tie and Sui Dongliang. He would go on to score his first goal against Bosnia-Herzegovina in a friendly on March 3, 1997, in a 3–0 win. After playing in several FIFA World Cup qualification games he was dropped from the team after China did not qualify. After several years out being dropped from international football Zhang Xiaorui would return to the senior team when the new Chinese Head coach Bora Milutinović would include him in the squads that were playing friendlies in preparation for the 2000 AFC Asian Cup, however once these ended the manager decided not to call him into the squad anymore.

== Management career ==
In 2008 Zhang Xiaorui was hired to be a player-manager of Chinese Yi League club Tianjin Tuanbo New City. In his first season, he would guide the team to a second-place finish in the Southern Group and a place in the play-offs where they were unable to win promotion. He was sacked on 10 March 2010, with Belgian manager Patrick De Wilde taking charge. In November 2010 Zhang would join Tianjin Runyulong as the club's General manager and oversaw the club's takeover of second-tier football club Anhui Jiufang F.C. before leaving the club on January 5, 2012, to return to management with the Tianjin Teda U-19 team.

On 17 October 2025, Zhang was appointed as the head coach of China League One club Foshan Nanshi.

On 26 January 2026, Zhang was appointed as the general manager of China League One club Meizhou Hakka.

On 3 August 2026, Zhang was named as the head coach of China League Two side Lanzhou Longyuan Athletic.
