= Ningbo Cixi Stadium =

Sports venue in Cixi, Ningbo, China

Coordinates: 30.180061°N 121.266918°E

Ningbo Cixi Stadium (Simplified Chinese: 宁波慈溪体育场) is a multi-use stadium in Cixi, Ningbo, China. It is currently used mostly for football matches. The stadium holds 16,000 people.
