= Guangdong GZ-Power F.C. =

Association football club in China

Guangdong GZ-Power
- Full name: Guangdong GZ-Power Football Club 广东广州豹足球俱乐部
- Founded: 23 March 2023; 3 years ago
- Ground: Yuexiushan Stadium
- Capacity: 18,000
- Owner(s): Guangzhou Automobile Industry Group (19%); Guangzhou Medicine (15%); Guangzhou Port Group (15%); Yuexiu Property (15%); GAC Group (12%); Guangzhou Wanli Group Co., Ltd. (12%); Guangzhou Science and Technology Finance Group Co. (12%)
- Chairman: Chen Xiushen
- Head coach: Feng Feng
- League: Chinese Super League
- 2026: China League One, 1st of 16 (promoted)
Home colours	Away colours

Guangdong GZ-Power Football Club, (Note: simplified Chinese: 广东广州豹足球俱乐部; traditional Chinese: 廣東廣州豹足球俱樂部; pinyin: Guǎngdōng Guǎngzhōu Bào Zúqiú Jùlèbù; lit. 'Guangdong Guangzhou Leopards F.C.') commonly known as GZ-Power FC, is a Chinese professional football club based in Guangzhou, Guangdong, that competes in the Chinese Super League, the top tier of Chinese football. Guangdong GZ-Power plays its home matches at the Yuexiushan Stadium, located within Yuexiu District. Founded in 2023 as Guangzhou E-Power Football Club, the club changed to its current name in 2024.

== History ==
Guangzhou E-Power were registered as a football club on 23 March 2023 by the Guangzhou Automobile Industry Group and seven other state-owned enterprises. However, the club were not officially founded until 20 May 2023, when it hosted its formation ceremony at Tianhe Stadium. On 11 April 2023, Guangzhou E-Power appointed Li Bing as manager for the first-team in preparation for the 2023 CMCL season, in the fourth tier of Chinese football, and he was appointed with a vision to win promotion to China League Two.

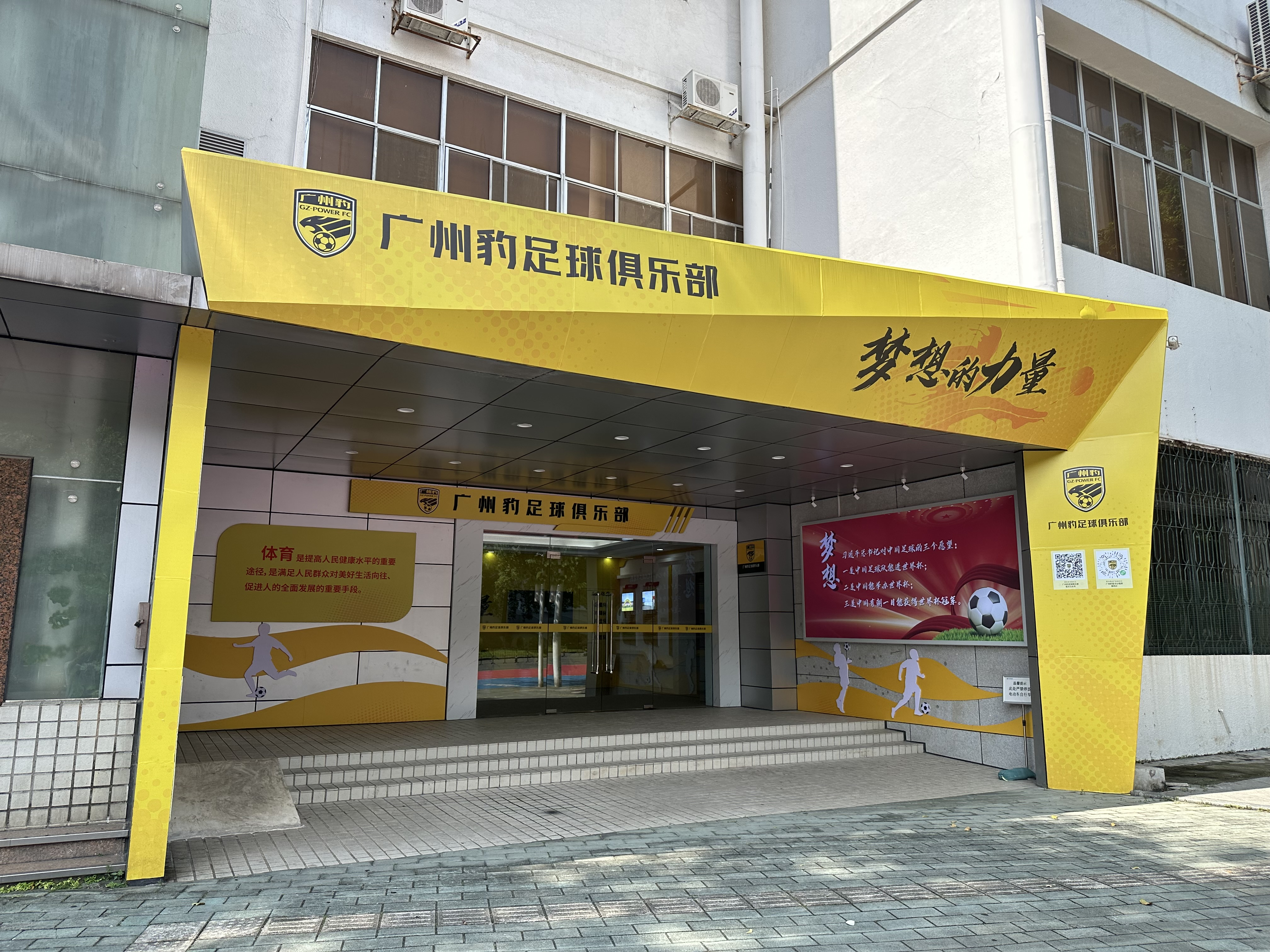
The club's headquarters is located near Tianhe Stadium.

Between 22 May and 31 May 2023, Guangzhou E-Power served as the host for the CMCL regionals group in the cities of Guangzhou and Foshan, in which the club succeeded in as they grabbed a spot in the final round with a win over Macau side Chao Pak Kei in the qualifying round. Guangzhou E-Power were drawn into group B in the final round, a group which consisted of clubs like Langfang Glory City and Binzhou Huilong. Guangzhou E-Power finished second in the group, but lost to Binzhou Huilong in the promotion play-offs.

On 6 February 2024, it was announced by the Chinese Football Association that Guangzhou E-Power were promoted to China League Two, the Chinese third-tier, after the dissolutions of sufficient teams above them in the Chinese football pyramid.

On 4 March 2024, the club changed their name to Guangdong GZ-Power Football Club. In the 2024 season, GZ-Power won the season's league title.

On 11 October 2026, Guangdong GZ-Power Football Club secured its historic first-ever promotion to the Chinese Super League from next season after defeat Jiangxi Dingnan United 3–1 on matchweek 26, League one champions with four games left and ended two year in second tier.

== Players ==
=== Current squad ===
As of March 2026

Note: Flags indicate national team as defined under FIFA eligibility rules; some limited exceptions apply. Players may hold more than one non-FIFA nationality.

No.	Pos.	Nation	Player
2	DF	CHN	Liu Bin
3	DF	CHN	Han Xuan
4	DF	CHN	Liu Langzhou
5	DF	CHN	Jiang Jihong
6	MF	CHN	Duan Yunzi
7	FW	GUI	Ousmane Camara
8	MF	CHN	Cai Haochang
10	FW	CHN	Liang Xueming
11	MF	BRA	Nikão
14	MF	CHN	Tian Jiarui
15	DF	CHN	Deng Biao
16	DF	CHN	Liao Junjian
17	FW	CHN	Yang Hao
18	MF	CHN	Wang Haobin (on loan from Shandong Taishan)

No.	Pos.	Nation	Player
19	GK	CHN	Chen Junxu
20	FW	BRA	João Carlos
22	GK	CHN	Xiao Jiaqi
24	MF	CHN	Wang Junjie (on loan from Zhejiang FC)
25	DF	TPE	Wang Chien-ming
27	MF	CHN	Gao Huaze
28	MF	CHN	Wang Heyi
29	MF	CHN	Wang Jingbin
32	MF	CHN	Wei Wenning
34	MF	CHN	Hou Yu
38	DF	CHN	Xiao Yuhan
39	DF	CHN	Huang Shenghao
43	MF	CHN	Xiao Kun
45	GK	CHN	Xue Sibo

=== Out on loan ===
Note: Flags indicate national team as defined under FIFA eligibility rules; some limited exceptions apply. Players may hold more than one non-FIFA nationality.

No.	Pos.	Nation	Player
—	MF	CHN	Cui Xinglong (at Chengdu Rongcheng B until 31 December 2026)
—	MF	CHN	Li Wenle (at Chengdu Rongcheng B until 31 December 2026)

No.	Pos.	Nation	Player
—	DF	CHN	Jiang Zhiqin (at Foshan Nanshi until 31 December 2026)
—	FW	CHN	Ai Chuwei (at Dalian Kewei until 31 December 2026)

== Coaching staff ==
=== Management ===
Position	Staff
Head coach	(China) Feng Feng
Assistant coaches	(China) Xiao Zhi (China) Liu Tao (China) Chi Jingtian
Goalkeeping coach	(China) Li Wei
Fitness coach	(Spain) Roberto Tendero

== Honours ==
- China League One
  - Winner (1): 2026
- China League Two
  - Winner (1): 2024
