= 2026 China League One =

China League One
- Season: 2026
- Dates: 14 March – 7 November
- Champions: Guangdong GZ-Power
- Promoted: Guangdong GZ-Power; Nantong Zhiyun
- Relegated: Jiangxi Dingnan United; Meizhou Hakka; Foshan Nanshi
- Matches: 240
- Goals: 649 (2.7 per match)
- Top goalscorer: Giovanny (17 goals)
- Total attendance: 2,194,040
- Average attendance: 9,142

The 2026 C'estbon Chinese Football League 1 (Chinese: 2026怡宝中国足球甲级联赛) was the 23rd season of China League One, the second tier of the Chinese football league pyramid, since its establishment in 2004.

== Summary ==
in 2022, Chinese Communist Party (CCP) officials launched an anti-corruption probe resulting in eight footballing officials being investigated for "suspected of violations of discipline and law". In August 2024, former CCP Committee Secretary of the Chinese Football Association (CFA), Du Zhaocai, pleaded guilty to accepting more than US$6.1 million in bribes. On 10 September, CFA banned 38 players, including former nationals, Jin Jingdao, Guo Tianyu, and five officials for life over allegations of match-fixing and other forms of corruption. Other players and officials were also given shorter five years bans.

Four China League One clubs were also punished with fines and point deductions for the 2026 China League One. Changchun Yatai was docked four points. Meizhou Hakka, Ningbo and Suzhou Dongwu were docked three points each.

== Clubs ==
=== Club changes ===
==== To League One ====
**Teams promoted from 2025 China League Two**

- Guangxi Hengchen
- Wuxi Wugo

**Teams relegated from 2025 Chinese Super League**

- Meizhou Hakka
- Changchun Yatai

==== From League One ====
**Teams promoted to 2026 Chinese Super League**

- Liaoning Tieren
- Chongqing Tonglianglong

**Teams relegated to 2026 China League Two**

- Guangxi Pingguo
- Qingdao Red Lions

- Shanghai Jiading Huilong F.C. relocated to Ningbo, Zhejiang in December 2025, and changed their name to Ningbo.

=== Stadiums and locations ===
Locations of the 2026 China League One teams
2026 China League One teams in Guangdong and Jiangxi
2026 China League One teams in Jiangsu

Team	Head coach	City	Stadium	Capacity	2025 season
Meizhou Hakka ^{R}	(China) Zhu Jiong	Wuhua	Huitang Stadium	27,000	CSL, 15th
Changchun Yatai ^{R}	(China) Yan Feng	Changchun	Development Area Stadium	23,400	CSL, 16th
Guangdong GZ-Power	(China) Feng Feng	Guangzhou	Yuexiushan Stadium	18,000	3rd
Yanbian Longding	(South Korea) Lee Ki-hyung	Yanji	Yanji Stadium	30,000	4th
Shijiazhuang Gongfu	(Spain) Jesús Tato	Shijiazhuang	Yutong International Sports Center	38,000	5th
Jiangxi Dingnan United	(China) Li Xiaoting	Dingnan	Dingnan Youth Football Training Center	12,000	6th
Nantong Zhiyun	(South Korea) Kim Dae-eui	Rugao	Rugao Olympic Sports Center	25,000	7th
Dalian K'un City	(China) Yang Lin	Dalian	Jinzhou Stadium	30,776	8th
Shaanxi Union	(China) Chen Tao	Xi'an	Xi'an International Football Center	60,235	9th
Suzhou Dongwu	(China) Guo Hui	Suzhou	Suzhou Sports Center	35,000	10th
Nanjing City	(Bulgaria) Zoran Janković	Nanjing	Wutaishan Stadium	22,000	11th
Ningbo	(Spain) Sergio Zarco Díaz	Ningbo	Ningbo Cixi Stadium (Cixi)	16,000	12th
Foshan Nanshi	(China) Li Haijun	Foshan	Nanhai Sports Center	20,000	13th
Shenzhen Juniors	(Spain) David Pirri	Shenzhen	Bao'an Stadium	44,050	14th
Guangxi Hengchen ^{P}	(China) Liu Junwei	Nanning	Guangxi Sports Center	60,000	CL2, 1st
Guangxi Hengchen ^{P}	(China) Liu Junwei	Nanning	Qinzhou Sports Center (Qinzhou)		CL2, 1st
Wuxi Wugo ^{P}	(Portugal) Bruno Dias	Wuxi	Jiangyin Sports Centre (Jiangyin)	30,161	CL2, 2nd
Wuxi Wugo ^{P}	(Portugal) Bruno Dias	Wuxi	Yixing Sports Center (Yixing)		CL2, 2nd

=== Managerial changes ===
Team	Outgoing manager	Manner of departure	Date of vacancy	Position in table	Incoming manager	Date of appointment
Shaanxi Union	(Curaçao) Giovanni Franken	Mutual consent	8 November 2025	Pre-season	(Netherlands) Henk Fraser	1 January 2026
Jiangxi Dingnan United	(China) Liu Jianye	Signed by Chongqing Tonglianglong	13 December 2025	Pre-season	(China) Mao Biao	14 December 2025
Dalian K'un City	(China) Zhao Faqing	Mutual consent	14 December 2025	Pre-season	(China) Zhang Yaokun	14 December 2025
Shenzhen Juniors	(China) Zhang Jun	Mutual consent	22 December 2025	Pre-season	(Spain) Ramiro Amarelle	23 December 2025
Changchun Yatai	(Portugal) Ricardo Soares	Mutual consent	31 December 2025	Pre-season	(China) Yan Feng	1 January 2026
Suzhou Dongwu	(Spain) Sergio Zarco Díaz	Mutual consent	16 January 2026	Pre-season	(China) Yu Yuanwei	16 January 2026
Ningbo	(Bulgaria) Zoran Janković	Mutual consent	26 January 2026	Pre-season	(China) Yang Lin	26 January 2026
Meizhou Hakka	(China) Qu Gang	Signed by Changchun Yatai	1 January 2026	Pre-season	(Switzerland) Gino Lettieri	26 January 2026
Foshan Nanshi	(China) Zhang Xiaorui	Signed by Meizhou Hakka	26 January 2026	Pre-season	(China) Zhang Chiming	11 March 2026
Nanjing City	(China) Zhang Xiaofeng	Change of role	10 March 2026	Pre-season	(Brazil) Rodney Gonçalves	14 March 2026
Ningbo	(China) Yang Lin	Change of role	6 April 2026	14th	(China) Li Weifeng	10 April 2026
Shijiazhuang Gongfu	(China) Niu Hongli	Resigned	16 April 2026	12th	(China) Xiao Zhanbo (interim)	16 April 2026
Meizhou Hakka	(Switzerland) Gino Lettieri	Resigned	26 April 2026	15th	(China) Zhang Xiaorui (interim)	26 April 2026
Nanjing City	(Brazil) Rodney Gonçalves	Moved to technical director and assistant coach	27 April 2026	12th	(China) Zhang Xiaofeng	27 April 2026
Shijiazhuang Gongfu	(China) Xiao Zhanbo (interim)	Returned to assistant coach role	30 April 2026	13th	(Spain) Jesús Tato	30 April 2026
Shaanxi Union	(Netherlands) Henk Fraser	Resigned	7 June 2026	9th	(Netherlands) Jouad Boufarra (interim)	8 June 2026
Meizhou Hakka	(China) Zhang Xiaorui (interim)	Returned to general manager	5 June 2026	16th	(China) Zhu Jiong	8 June 2026
Shaanxi Union	(Netherlands) Jouad Boufarra (interim)	Returned to assistant coach role	20 June 2026	9th	(China) Chen Tao	21 June 2026
Suzhou Dongwu	(China) Yu Yuanwei	Mutual consent	3 July 2026	15th	(China) Guo Hui	4 July 2026
Shenzhen Juniors	(Spain) Ramiro Amarelle	Mutual consent	14 July 2026	2nd	(China) Ren Peng (interim)	14 July 2026
Shenzhen Juniors	(China) Ren Peng (interim)	End of interim spell	24 July 2026	2nd	(Spain) David Pirri	24 July 2026
Foshan Nanshi	(China) Zhang Chiming	Resigned	5 August 2026	15th	(China) Li Yao	7 August 2026
Dalian K'un City	(China) Zhang Yaokun	Appointed by China U16	21 August 2026	12th	(China) Yang Lin	21 August 2026
Wuxi Wugo	(South Korea) Kim Bong-gil (Note: The match on 29 August 2026 was managed on an interim basis by fitness coach Wang Dan.)	Contract expired	20 August 2026	8th	(Portugal) Bruno Dias	31 August 2026
Nanjing City	(China) Zhang Xiaofeng	Resigned as manager; remained general manager	4 September 2026	13th	(China) Li Yinan	4 September 2026
Jiangxi Dingnan United	(China) Mao Biao	Sacked	30 September 2026	13th	(China) Li Xiaoting (caretaker)	1 October 2026
Foshan Nanshi	(China) Li Yao	Mutual consent	24 September 2026	16th	(China) Li Haijun	4 October 2026
Ningbo	(China) Li Weifeng	Mutual consent	9 October 2026	10th	(China) Zhang Chen (interim)	10 October 2026
Nanjing City	(China) Li Yinan	Mutual consent	10 October 2026	14th	(Bulgaria) Zoran Janković	10 October 2026
Ningbo	(China) Zhang Chen (interim)	End of interim spell	13 October 2026	10th	(Spain) Sergio Zarco Díaz	13 October 2026

=== Foreign players ===
- Players name in **bold** indicates the player is registered during the mid-season transfer window.
- Players name in italics indicates the player is out of squad or left their respective clubs during the mid-season transfer window.

Team	Player 1	Player 2	Player 3	Hong Kong/Macau/Taiwan players^{1}	Naturalised players	Reserves players	Former players
Changchun Yatai	(Austria) Constantin Reiner	(Colombia) Juan Camilo Salazar	(Norway) Ohi Omoijuanfo	(Hong Kong) Clement Benhaddouche	(United States) → (China) Lü Kaiwen^{2}		
Dalian K'un City	(Burkina Faso) Cyrille Bayala	(Norway) Kristoffer Normann Hansen	(Zimbabwe) Nyasha Mushekwi	(Chinese Taipei) Wu Yen-shu			
Foshan Nanshi	(Netherlands) Rodney Antwi	(Senegal) Mame Mor Ndiaye	(Serbia) **Miloš Deletić**	(Hong Kong) Nicholas Benavides			(Brazil) Gabriel Bispo
Guangdong GZ-Power	(Brazil) **João Carlos**	(Brazil) Nikão	(Guinea) Ousmane Camara	(Chinese Taipei) Wang Chien-ming			(Romania) Alexandru Tudorie
Guangxi Hengchen	(Democratic Republic of the Congo) Noel Mbo	(Georgia (country)) Rati Ardazishvili	(Madagascar) Loïc Lapoussin	(Chinese Taipei) Yu Yao-hsing			
Jiangxi Dingnan United	(Brazil) Daciel	(Brazil) Erikys	(Colombia) Manuel Palacios	(Chinese Taipei) Chen Po-liang	(Slovenia) → (China) Marcel Petrov^{2}		
Meizhou Hakka	(Cameroon) Vinni Triboulet	(France) Théo Pellenard	(Morocco) **Hamza Sakhi**	(Hong Kong) **Yu Wai Lim**		(Romania) Patrick Popescu	
Nantong Zhiyun	(Brazil) Lucas Kal	(Colombia) **Jasond González**	(Democratic Republic of the Congo) Aldo Kalulu	(Hong Kong) Remi Dujardin	(South Korea) → (China) Xu Hui^{2}		(Bulgaria) Aleksandar Kolev
Nanjing City	(Brazil) Robertinho	(Brazil) Zé Vitor	(Cameroon) Jerome Ngom Mbekeli	(Hong Kong) Wong Wai			
Ningbo	(Brazil) Léo Cittadini	(Brazil) Leonardo	(Serbia) **Stefan Tomović**	(Chinese Taipei) Chen Hao-wei		(Nigeria) Viv Solomon-Otabor	
Shaanxi Union	(Kosovo) Astrit Selmani	(Netherlands) Rayan El Azrak	(Syria) Daleho Irandust	(Hong Kong) Ma Hei Wai			
Shenzhen Juniors	(Brazil) Rodrigo Henrique	(England) **Joel Nouble**	(Serbia) Rade Dugalić	(Hong Kong) Leung Nok Hang		(Cameroon) Paul Garita	
Shijiazhuang Gongfu	(Brazil) Dominic Vinicius	(Brazil) Higor Vidal	(Suriname) Tyrone Conraad				
Suzhou Dongwu	(Angola) Estrela	(Brazil) **Farley Rosa**	(Lebanon) **Omar Bugiel**				
Wuxi Wugo	(Bosnia and Herzegovina) Tarik Isić	(Netherlands) Nino Noordanus	(Uruguay) Nicolás Albarracín				
Yanbian Longding	(Brazil) Giovanny	(Costa Rica) Felicio Brown Forbes	(Portugal) Joaquim Domingos	(Hong Kong) Vas Nuñez			

- **^1** For Hong Kong, Macau, or Taiwanese players, if they are non-naturalised and were registered as professional footballers in Hong Kong's, Macau's, or Chinese Taipei's football association for the first time, they are recognised as native players. Otherwise they are recognised as foreign players.
- **^2** Naturalised players whose parents or grandparents were born in mainland China, thus are regarded as local players.

== League table ==
Pos	Team	Pld	W	D	L	GF	GA	GD	Pts	Promotion, qualification or relegation
1	Guangdong GZ-Power (C, P)	30	18	8	4	58	31	+27	62	Promotion to Super League
2	Nantong Zhiyun (P)	30	16	9	5	40	22	+18	57	Promotion to Super League
3	Shaanxi Union	30	15	6	9	57	30	+27	51	
4	Guangxi Hengchen	30	13	8	9	46	39	+7	47	
5	Shenzhen Juniors	30	12	11	7	43	36	+7	47	
6	Yanbian Longding	30	12	10	8	43	31	+12	46	
7	Wuxi Wugo	30	12	7	11	46	35	+11	43	
8	Shijiazhuang Gongfu	30	11	9	10	31	30	+1	42	
9	Changchun Yatai (Note: Changchun Yatai had 4 points deducted for violation of sports ethics and loss of sportsmanship, engaging in improper transactions to seek illegitimate benefits.)	30	12	7	11	47	46	+1	39	
10	Ningbo (Note: Ningbo had 3 points deducted for violation of sports ethics and loss of sportsmanship, engaging in improper transactions to seek illegitimate benefits.)	30	11	7	12	36	37	−1	37	
11	Dalian K'un City	30	9	10	11	38	43	−5	37	
12	Nanjing City	30	9	7	14	32	40	−8	34	
13	Suzhou Dongwu (Note: Suzhou Dongwu had 3 points deducted for violation of sports ethics and loss of sportsmanship, engaging in improper transactions to seek illegitimate benefits.)	30	8	11	11	36	42	−6	32	
14	Jiangxi Dingnan United (R)	30	5	13	12	40	53	−13	28	Qualification for Relegation play-offs
15	Meizhou Hakka (Note: Meizhou Hakka had 9 points deducted for violation of sports ethics and loss of sportsmanship, engaging in improper transactions to seek illegitimate benefits.) (R)	30	7	4	19	26	63	−37	16	Relegation to League Two
16	Foshan Nanshi (R)	30	3	7	20	30	71	−41	16	Relegation to League Two

Rules for classification:
- During season: 1) Points; 2) Head-to-head points; 3) Head-to-head goal difference; 4) Head-to-head goals scored; 5) Goal difference; 6) Goals scored; 7) Rankings in the previous season. (Rules 2 to 4 are only applied when teams concerned have finished both/all the matches against others.)
- After season: 1) Points; 2) Head-to-head points; 3) Head-to-head goal difference; 4) Head-to-head goals scored; 5) Goal difference; 6) Goals scored; 7) Disciplinary points (yellow card = 1 point, red card = 3 points); 8) Drawing of lots.
  (C) Champions; (P) Promoted; (R) Relegated
  Notes:

== Results ==
Home \ Away	CCY	DKC	FSN	GZP	GXH	JDU	MZH	NJC	NTZ	NIB	SXU	SZJ	SJZ	SZD	WXW	YBL
Changchun Yatai	—	2–1	6–0	1–2	1–2	1–0	4–1	2–1	1–0	2–0	2–1	0–4	2–2	1–0	1–5	1–1
Dalian K'un City	1–1	—	2–2	1–1	3–2	1–1	3–0	2–0	3–2	1–0	2–2	5–4	0–0	0–0	2–1	1–2
Foshan Nanshi	1–3	0–0	—	2–3	1–0	1–1	0–1	2–5	1–2	1–4	0–5	1–2	1–2	1–1	0–2	0–2
Guangdong GZ-Power	3–0	1–1	1–1	—	2–0	3–1	3–0	1–3	3–1	2–0	2–1	0–0	2–0	1–1	1–0	3–4
Guangxi Hengchen	2–2	3–1	3–3	1–0	—	4–4	1–0	1–0	0–0	2–1	3–0	1–1	0–1	3–3	1–2	2–1
Jiangxi Dingnan United	2–3	2–1	1–1	1–3	2–1	—	0–0	1–1	1–1	0–1	1–1	0–0	1–2	3–4	3–3	1–2
Meizhou Hakka	1–3	2–0	3–2	1–5	2–1	2–2	—	2–1	0–1	0–3	0–2	1–4	1–3	1–2	0–3	0–3
Nanjing City	2–1	2–0	3–1	0–1	0–2	1–1	2–0	—	1–1	1–2	1–4	1–3	1–0	1–0	0–3	0–0
Nantong Zhiyun	2–0	1–0	3–1	1–1	0–1	5–1	1–3	1–0	—	1–0	4–1	1–0	2–1	1–0	1–0	2–0
Ningbo	3–1	1–0	1–0	1–2	2–4	2–1	1–1	0–0	1–1	—	1–0	0–3	2–1	1–1	2–3	2–3
Shaanxi Union	2–1	3–0	5–1	4–0	4–0	2–1	4–0	0–1	0–0	1–1	—	3–0	1–0	2–2	2–1	3–1
Shenzhen Juniors	1–1	1–1	0–3	1–4	1–1	3–3	5–1	3–1	0–0	0–0	1–0	—	2–0	1–4	1–0	1–0
Shijiazhuang Gongfu	1–0	1–0	0–1	1–1	0–3	1–2	0–1	2–1	1–1	3–2	2–1	0–0	—	1–1	2–0	0–0
Suzhou Dongwu	2–1	1–2	3–2	2–2	1–0	0–1	1–0	2–0	0–0	1–2	0–3	0–0	0–3	—	1–3	0–1
Wuxi Wugo	1–1	2–3	2–0	0–3	0–1	0–2	1–1	1–1	1–3	1–0	2–0	4–0	0–0	2–2	—	2–0
Yanbian Longding	2–2	3–1	5–0	1–2	1–1	3–0	2–1	1–1	0–1	0–0	0–0	0–1	1–1	3–1	1–1	—

Legend: Blue = home team win; Yellow = draw; Red = away team win.
For upcoming matches, an "a" indicates there is an article about the rivalry between the two participants.

== Positions by round ==
To preserve chronological evolvements, any postponed matches are not included to the round at which they were originally scheduled, but added to the full round they were played immediately afterwards. For example, if a match is scheduled for round 7, but then played between rounds 8 and 9, it will be added to the standings for round 8.

Team ╲ Round	1	2	3	4	5	6	7	8	9	10	11	12	13	14	15	16	17	18	19	20	21	22	23	24	25	26	27	28	29	30
Guangdong GZ-Power	2	2	3	3	1	1	1	1	2	2	1	1	1	1	1	1	1	1	1	1	1	1	1	1	1	1	1	1	1	1
Nantong Zhiyun	7	5	2	1	3	2	3	3	3	3	3	3	3	4	3	3	2	3	5	4	5	4	4	4	3	2	2	2	2	2
Shaanxi Union	11	12	10	10	11	11	11	12	9	9	9	10	9	7	8	8	8	8	6	6	6	6	6	5	5	5	5	5	3	3
Guangxi Hengchen	9	8	4	7	8	7	5	4	5	6	5	4	4	5	4	4	3	4	4	5	3	3	3	2	2	3	3	3	4	4
Shenzhen Juniors	8	10	5	4	2	4	2	2	1	1	2	2	2	2	2	5	5	2	2	2	2	2	2	3	4	4	4	4	5	5
Yanbian Longding	1	3	7	5	6	6	7	7	4	5	6	5	5	3	5	2	4	5	3	3	4	5	5	6	6	8	6	6	6	6
Wuxi Wugo	3	1	1	2	4	5	6	6	7	4	4	6	8	9	7	7	7	7	8	8	10	8	11	7	8	7	8	8	7	7
Shijiazhuang Gongfu	10	9	11	12	13	13	14	15	15	14	14	14	14	14	13	13	13	13	13	13	9	7	8	8	7	6	7	7	8	8
Changchun Yatai	16	16	15	14	9	10	12	10	13	13	11	12	11	12	12	11	10	11	11	9	11	10	9	9	9	9	9	9	9	9
Ningbo	14	14	16	16	16	16	13	13	12	12	10	8	6	6	6	6	6	6	7	7	7	9	7	10	10	10	10	11	10	10
Dalian K'un City	4	7	8	9	7	8	8	9	10	10	12	11	12	11	11	12	11	12	12	11	8	11	10	11	11	11	11	10	11	11
Nanjing City	6	6	9	8	10	12	9	8	8	8	8	9	7	8	9	9	9	10	10	12	13	14	14	14	14	14	14	13	12	12
Suzhou Dongwu	13	11	12	15	12	14	15	14	14	15	15	15	15	15	16	15	14	14	14	14	14	12	12	12	12	12	12	12	13	13
Jiangxi Dingnan United	5	4	6	6	5	3	4	5	6	7	7	7	10	10	10	10	12	9	9	10	12	13	13	13	13	13	13	14	14	14
Meizhou Hakka	15	15	13	11	15	15	16	16	16	16	16	16	16	16	15	16	16	15	15	15	15	15	15	15	15	15	15	15	15	15
Foshan Nanshi	12	13	14	13	14	9	10	11	11	11	13	13	13	13	14	14	15	16	16	16	16	16	16	16	16	16	16	16	16	16

Leader and promotion to Super League
Promotion to Super League
Qualification to Relegation play-offs
Relegation to League Two

== Results by match played ==
Team ╲ Round	1	2	3	4	5	6	7	8	9	10	11	12	13	14	15	16	17	18	19	20	21	22	23	24	25	26	27	28	29	30
Changchun Yatai	L	L	W	W	W	L	L	W	L	D	W	L	W	L	L	W	D	L	L	W	L	W	W	D	D	D	D	W	W	D
Dalian K'un City	W	L	D	L	W	L	D	D	L	D	L	W	L	W	L	D	D	L	L	W	W	D	D	W	L	D	D	W	L	W
Foshan Nanshi	L	L	L	W	L	W	D	D	D	D	L	L	L	L	L	L	D	L	L	L	L	D	L	D	W	L	L	L	L	L
Guangdong GZ-Power	W	W	L	W	W	W	W	D	L	D	W	W	D	W	W	W	D	W	W	W	W	D	D	W	W	W	L	D	D	L
Guangxi Hengchen	L	W	W	L	L	W	W	D	D	D	D	W	W	W	W	D	W	L	W	D	W	L	W	W	L	D	D	L	L	L
Jiangxi Dingnan United	W	D	D	D	W	W	D	L	D	D	L	D	L	D	L	D	L	W	D	L	L	L	L	D	D	L	W	L	D	L
Meizhou Hakka	L	L	W	W	L	L	L	L	W	D	D	W	L	L	W	L	L	W	L	L	D	L	W	L	D	L	L	L	L	L
Nanjing City	W	D	L	D	L	L	W	W	D	W	L	L	W	L	L	L	D	D	D	L	L	L	L	L	L	D	W	W	W	W
Nantong Zhiyun	W	D	W	W	D	W	L	W	D	D	W	L	D	W	W	D	W	D	D	W	L	D	W	L	W	W	W	W	L	W
Ningbo	L	L	L	L	D	W	W	D	W	D	W	W	W	W	W	L	L	L	D	L	D	L	W	L	L	D	D	L	W	W
Shaanxi Union	L	W	W	L	D	D	D	D	W	L	W	L	W	W	L	W	D	L	W	L	W	W	L	D	W	W	W	L	W	W
Shenzhen Juniors	W	L	W	W	W	L	W	W	W	D	D	L	D	D	D	L	W	W	D	W	W	W	D	D	L	D	D	L	D	L
Shijiazhuang Gongfu	L	W	L	L	L	D	L	L	L	D	D	W	L	L	D	D	D	W	W	W	W	W	D	W	W	W	L	W	D	D
Suzhou Dongwu	L	W	L	L	W	L	L	D	L	L	D	L	D	L	D	D	W	W	D	D	W	W	W	D	D	L	D	D	L	W
Wuxi Wugo	W	W	W	L	L	D	D	L	D	W	D	D	L	L	W	W	L	W	L	L	L	W	L	W	D	W	L	W	W	D
Yanbian Longding	W	D	L	W	D	D	D	D	W	D	L	W	W	W	D	W	D	L	W	W	L	L	L	L	D	L	W	W	W	D

W = Win; D = Draw; L = Loss

== Relegation play-offs ==
Team 1	Agg.	Team 2	1st leg	2nd leg
Guizhou Guiyang Athletic	5–1	Jiangxi Dingnan United	3–1	2–0

15 November 2026
15:00 UTC+8

Guizhou Guiyang Athletic	3–1	Jiangxi Dingnan United

Zunyi Olympic Sports Centre Stadium, Zunyi
Referee: Qiu Zhaojun

22 November 2026
15:30 UTC+8

Jiangxi Dingnan United	0–2	Guizhou Guiyang Athletic

Dingnan Youth Football Training Center, Dingnan
Referee: Li Haixin
