= 2017 Chinese FA Cup =

2017 The Chinese Football Association Cup
CFA Cup

Tournament details
- Country: China
- Dates: 12 November 2016–26 November 2017
- Teams: 76

Final positions
- Champions: Shanghai Greenland Shenhua (2nd title)
- Runners-up: Shanghai SIPG
- AFC Champions League: Shanghai Greenland Shenhua

Tournament statistics
- Matches played: 70
- Goals scored: 192 (2.74 per match)
- Attendance: 668,674 (9,552 per match)
- Top goal scorer(s): (Nigeria) Obafemi Martins (6 goals)

Awards
- Best player: (China) Cao Yunding

Yanjing Beer 2017 Chinese FA Cup (Chinese: 燕京啤酒2017中国足球协会杯) was the 19th edition of the Chinese FA Cup. The winner Shanghai Greenland Shenhua qualified for the group stage of the 2018 AFC Champions League.

== Schedule ==
Round	Date	Clubs remaining	Clubs involved	Winners from previous round	New entries this round	New Entries Notes
Preliminary round	12 November 2016 – 20 November 2016	76	12	none	12	
Qualifying round	31 December 2016 – 2 January 2017	71	15	7	8	
First round	18–19 March; 25–26 March	64	32	8	24	24 2017 China League Two teams
Second round	18–20 April	48	32	16	16	16 2017 China League One teams
Third round	2–3 May	32	32	16	16	16 2017 Chinese Super League teams
Fourth round	21 June	16	16	16	none	
Fifth round	First Leg 18–19 July; Second Leg 1–3 August	8	8	8	none	
Semi-finals	First Leg 15–16 August; Second Leg 29–30 September	4	4	4	none	
Final	First Leg 19 November; Second Leg 26 November	2	2	2	none	

== Home Advantage Decision ==
According to Chinese FA Cup Procedure, in each round, home team advantages are decided as follows.

Rounds	Rules
First Round	According to FA Cup draw.
Second Round	The team in lower tier in 2017 season decides whether they play at home.
Third Round	The team in lower tier in 2017 season decides whether they play at home.
Fourth Round	Teams in different tiers: The team in lower tier in 2017 season decides whether they play at home. Teams in the same tier: The team ranked higher in 2016 season decides whether they play at home.
Fifth Round	Teams in different tiers: The team in higher tier in 2017 season will hold the 1st leg and the other team hold the 2nd leg. Teams in the same tier: The team ranked lower in 2016 season will hold the 1st leg and the other team hold the 2nd leg.
Semi-finals	Teams in different tiers: The team in higher tier in 2017 season will hold the 1st leg and the other team hold the 2nd leg. Teams in the same tier: The team ranked lower in 2016 season will hold the 1st leg and the other team hold the 2nd leg.
Final	Teams in different tiers: The team in higher tier in 2017 season will hold the 1st leg and the other team hold the 2nd leg. Teams in the same tier: The team ranked lower in 2016 season will hold the 1st leg and the other team hold the 2nd leg.

== Qualifying rounds ==
=== Preliminary round ===
Number of teams per tier entering this round
Chinese Super League	China League One	China League Two	China Amateur Football League	Total
16 / 16	16 / 16	24 / 24	20 / 20	76 / 76

12 November 2016	Nanjing Zenith (A)	0–1	Heilongjiang Tianfeng (A)	Jiangning Sports Center, Nanjing
14:45

13 November 2016	Hebei Ronghaihang (A)	1–3	Shenyang City Public (A)	Hebei Institute of Communications Stadium, Shijiazhuang
14:30				Referee: Guo Hao

19 November 2016	Chongqing High Wave (A)	0–0 (0–2 p)	Liuzhou Ranko (A)	Nan'an Chayuan Shengdi Football Park, Chongqing
15:30				Referee: Xia Jun

19 November 2016	Qiannan Nan'ao (A)	1–2	Hangzhou Ange (A)	Weng'an County National Fitness Center, Qiannan

20 November 2016	Hubei Huachuang (A)	3–0	Wuhan Liangjianghui (A)	Tazi Lake Sports Centre, Wuhan

20 November 2016	Tianjin Kunshengsong (A)	w/o	Rizhao Yuqi (A)

Notes

1. Chongqing High Wave advanced to the Qualifying Round as the replacement of Guangzhou Haoxin, who defaulted from the competition.

=== Qualifying round ===
Number of teams per tier entering this round
Chinese Super League	China League One	China League Two	China Amateur Football League	Total
16 / 16	16 / 16	24 / 24	15 / 20	71 / 76

==== Group A ====
Team	Pld	W	D	L	GF	GA	GD	Pts
Liuzhou Ranko	3	2	1	0	7	3	+4	7
Heilongjiang Tianfeng	3	1	2	0	3	1	+2	5
Zhejiang Dacheng	3	0	2	1	3	6	−3	2
Rizhao Yuqi	3	0	1	2	5	8	−3	1

31 December 2016	Zhejiang Dacheng (A)	0–0	Heilongjiang Tianfeng (A)	Mission Hills Football Base, Haikou
9:30

31 December 2016	Liuzhou Ranko (A)	3–2	Rizhao Yuqi (A)	Mission Hills Football Base, Haikou
9:30

1 January 2017	Liuzhou Ranko (A)	3–0	Zhejiang Dacheng (A)	Mission Hills Football Base, Haikou
9:30

1 January 2017	Rizhao Yuqi (A)	0–2	Heilongjiang Tianfeng (A)	Mission Hills Football Base, Haikou
9:30

2 January 2017	Rizhao Yuqi (A)	3–3	Zhejiang Dacheng (A)	Mission Hills Football Base, Haikou
9:30

2 January 2017	Heilongjiang Tianfeng (A)	1–1	Liuzhou Ranko (A)	Mission Hills Football Base, Haikou
9:30

==== Group B ====
Team	Pld	W	D	L	GF	GA	GD	Pts
Dalian Tongshun	3	2	1	0	8	3	+5	7
Zhaoqing Hengtai	3	2	1	0	8	4	+4	7
Hubei Huachuang	3	1	0	2	6	10	−4	3
Chongqing High Wave	3	0	0	3	6	11	−5	0

31 December 2016	Hubei Huachuang (A)	2–4	Dalian Tongshun (A)	Mission Hills Football Base, Haikou
9:30

31 December 2016	Chongqing High Wave (A)	3–4	Zhaoqing Hengtai (A)	Mission Hills Football Base, Haikou
9:30

1 January 2017	Chongqing High Wave (A)	2–3	Hubei Huachuang (A)	Mission Hills Football Base, Haikou
9:30

1 January 2017	Zhaoqing Hengtai (A)	0–0	Dalian Tongshun (A)	Mission Hills Football Base, Haikou
9:30

2 January 2017	Zhaoqing Hengtai (A)	4–1	Hubei Huachuang (A)	Mission Hills Football Base, Haikou
9:30

2 January 2017	Dalian Tongshun (A)	4–1	Chongqing High Wave (A)	Mission Hills Football Base, Haikou
9:30

==== Group C ====
Team	Pld	W	D	L	GF	GA	GD	Pts
Qingdao Kunpeng	2	2	0	0	2	0	+2	6
Shanghai Jiading Boo King	2	1	0	1	2	1	+1	3
Shenyang City Public	2	0	0	2	0	3	−3	0

31 December 2016	Shanghai Jiading Boo King (A)	0–1	Qingdao Kunpeng (A)	Mission Hills Football Base, Haikou
14:30

1 January 2017	Shanghai Jiading Boo King (A)	2–0	Shenyang City Public (A)	Mission Hills Football Base, Haikou
14:30

2 January 2017	Qingdao Kunpeng (A)	1–0	Shenyang City Public (A)	Mission Hills Football Base, Haikou
14:30

==== Group D ====
Team	Pld	W	D	L	GF	GA	GD	Pts
Wuhan Chufeng Heli	3	3	0	0	12	4	+8	9
Hangzhou Ange	3	2	0	1	5	4	+1	6
Zunyi HNA Huaijiu	3	1	0	2	1	7	−6	3
Dalian Longjuanfeng	3	0	0	3	1	4	−3	0

31 December 2016	Dalian Longjuanfeng (A)	1–2	Wuhan Chufeng Heli (A)	Mission Hills Football Base, Haikou
14:30

31 December 2016	Zunyi HNA Huaijiu (A)	0–1	Hangzhou Ange (A)	Mission Hills Football Base, Haikou
14:30

1 January 2017	Zunyi HNA Huaijiu (A)	1–0	Dalian Longjuanfeng (A)	Mission Hills Football Base, Haikou
14:30

1 January 2017	Hangzhou Ange (A)	3–4	Wuhan Chufeng Heli (A)	Mission Hills Football Base, Haikou
14:30

2 January 2017	Hangzhou Ange (A)	1–0	Dalian Longjuanfeng (A)	Mission Hills Football Base, Haikou
14:30

2 January 2017	Wuhan Chufeng Heli (A)	6–0	Zunyi HNA Huaijiu (A)	Mission Hills Football Base, Haikou
14:30

== First round ==
Number of teams per tier entering this round
Chinese Super League	China League One	China League Two	China Amateur Football League	Total
16 / 16	16 / 16	24 / 24	8 / 20	64 / 76

18 March 2017	Shanghai JuJu Sports (3)	0–0 (2–3 p)	Jiangxi Liansheng (3)	Kangqiao Football Base, Shanghai
15:00				Attendance: 120; Referee: Yang Nan

18 March 2017	Zhaoqing Hengtai (A)	1–2	Nantong Zhiyun (3)	Guangdong Provincial People's Stadium, Guangzhou
15:00	Chen Qian 37'		Yu Jianfeng 28'; Chen Zheng 48'	Attendance: 566; Referee: Wang Wei

18 March 2017	Jiangsu Yancheng Dingli (3)	3–1	Hangzhou Ange (A)	Dafeng Olympic Sports Centre, Yancheng
15:00	Han Cai 31' (pen.); Xue Zhiwen 45'; Zhang Gen 90+3'		Wang Fei 55'	Attendance: 658; Referee: Wan Tao

18 March 2017	Liuzhou Ranko (A)	1–1 (2–4 p)	Shanghai Jiading Boo King (A)	Liuzhou Sports Centre, Liuzhou
15:30	Xue Yuzhen 58'		Wang Bin 35'	Attendance: 9,280; Referee: Zhong Jiawei

19 March 2017	Heilongjiang Lava Spring (3)	2–2 (5–4 p)	Qingdao Kunpeng (A)	Gaoming Sports Centre Stadium, Foshan
15:30	Zhao Wei 21'; Wang Ziming 41' (pen.)		Sun Kai 70' (pen.); Zheng Wei 86'	Attendance: 0 Referee: Zhen Wei

25 March 2017	Heilongjiang Tianfeng (A)	0–1	Shaanxi Chang'an Athletic (3)	Daqing Olympic Center Stadium, Daqing
14:00			Li Chenguang 89'	Attendance: 11,486; Referee: Liu Shaocheng

25 March 2017	Yinchuan Helanshan (3)	2–1	Shenyang Urban (3)	Helan Mountain Stadium, Yinchuan
14:30	Tan Tiancheng 4'; Liu Pujin 67'		Wu Dingmao 69'	Attendance: 3,952; Referee: Qiu Zhaojun

25 March 2017	Shanghai Sunfun (3)	2–2 (5–3 p)	Hainan Boying (3)	Chemical Industry Park Stadium, Shanghai
15:00	Liu Shuai 11'; Xiong Tao 79'		Song Xicun 45'; Huang Yabin 58'	Attendance: 511; Referee: Niu Minghui
	Penalties
	Liu Shuai (penalty scored); Gong Jinshuai (penalty scored); Wang Hao (penalty scored); Zhao Hongxu (penalty scored); Xiong Tao (penalty scored)		(penalty scored) Yu Chennan; (penalty missed) Li Zhaonan; (penalty scored) Xue Chen; (penalty scored) Zhang Kaiming

25 March 2017	Zhenjiang Huasa (3)	0–2	Hebei Elite (3)	Zhenjiang Sports and Exhibition Center, Zhenjiang
15:00			Yang He 57', 88'	Attendance: 4,518; Referee: Tang Kun

25 March 2017	Beijing Institute of Technology (3)	0–2	Qingdao Jonoon (3)	Liangxiang Sports Centre, Beijing
15:00			Zhong Yihao 31'; Sun Xu 44'	Attendance: 2,460; Referee: Huang Yi

25 March 2017	Wuhan Chufeng Heli (A)	0–2	Dalian Boyoung (3)	Tazi Lake Sports Centre, Wuhan
15:30			Ge Yuxiang 52'; Wu Qingsong 72'	Attendance: 0 Referee: Xing Qi

25 March 2017	Suzhou Dongwu (3)	1–0	Sichuan Longfor (3)	Suzhou Sports Center, Suzhou
15:30	Li Jian 11'			Attendance: 1,390; Referee: Liu Wei

25 March 2017	Chengdu Qbao (3)	2–0	Baotou Nanjiao (3)	Shuangliu Sports Centre Stadium, Chengdu
16:00	Zhang Zhichao 60'; Gan Rui 71' (pen.)			Attendance: 638; Referee: Huang Xiang

25 March 2017	Shenzhen Ledman (3)	2–0	Shenyang Dongjin (3)	Bao'an Stadium, Shenzhen
17:00	Yang Bin 5'; Ma Xiaolei 60'			Attendance: 5,118; Referee: Liu Xiufeng

25 March 2017	Meizhou Meixian Techand (3)	3–3 (4–3 p)	Hunan Billows (3)	Meixian Tsang Hin-chi Stadium, Meizhou
19:30	Pan Jia 12' (pen.); Hou Zhe 27'; Liang Rifu 50'		Liu Shuai 6'; Wang Qing 43'; Qiu Lingfeng 80'	Attendance: 4,352; Referee: Yang Kaizi

26 March 2017	Dalian Tongshun (A)	1–1 (3–4 p)	Jilin Baijia (3)	Jinzhou Stadium, Dalian
15:00	Huang Cheng 16'		Wang Yewen 18'	Attendance: 8,321; Referee: Xu Fuxin
	Penalties
	Li Jisheng (penalty scored); Li Peng (penalty scored); Huang Cheng (penalty missed); Liu Zhiqiang (penalty scored); Cong Lin (penalty missed)		(penalty scored) Ao Feifan; (penalty scored) Zhang Bo; (penalty scored) Mewlan Musa; (penalty scored) Yang Huikang

Notes

1. Heilongjiang Lava Spring played at neutral field due to their home stadium was incapable of hosting matches in March.
2. Shenyang Urban was given home advantage in the original draw, but the match was later switched to be hosted by Yinchuan Helanshan.
3. Hebei Elite was given home advantage in the original draw, but the match was later switched to be hosted by Zhenjiang Huasa.
4. Shenyang Dongjin was given home advantage in the original draw, but the match was later switched to be hosted by Shenzhen Ledman.

== Second round ==
Number of teams per tier entering this round
Chinese Super League	China League One	China League Two	China Amateur Football League	Total
16 / 16	16 / 16	15 / 24	1 / 20	48 / 76

18 April 2017	Heilongjiang Lava Spring (3)	1–0	Baoding Yingli ETS (2)	Shenyang Urban Construction University Stadium, Shenyang
15:00	Zhang Chengxiang 90+3'			Attendance: 298; Referee: Xu Fuxin

19 April 2017	Shanghai Sunfun (3)	2–0	Xinjiang Tianshan Leopard (2)	Chemical Industry Park Stadium, Shanghai
15:00	Wu Changqi 73'; Wei Jingxing 90+2'			Attendance: 130; Referee: Liu Lin

19 April 2017	Jiangxi Liansheng (3)	1–0	Beijing Enterprises (2)	Jiujiang Stadium, Jiujiang
15:00	Xu Chen 57'			Attendance: 7,833; Referee: Xing Qi

19 April 2017	Hebei Elite (3)	0–2	Nei Mongol Zhongyou (2)	Qinhuangdao China Football School Field 4, Qinhuangdao
15:00			Zhu Zhengyu 9'; Yu Wenhe 70'	Attendance: 156; Referee: Huang Xiang

19 April 2017	Qingdao Jonoon (3)	1–2	Shenzhen FC (2)	Qingdao Tiantai Stadium, Qingdao
15:00	Wang Ziming 40'		Wang Weilong 16'; Yu Shuai 71'	Attendance: 1,068; Referee: Chen Xin

19 April 2017	Yinchuan Helanshan (3)	0–1	Shijiazhuang Ever Bright (2)	Helan Mountain Stadium, Yinchuan
15:00			Liu Xinyu 53'	Referee: He Xiaohu

19 April 2017	Zhejiang Yiteng (2)	1–1 (4–5 p)	Jilin Baijia (3)	Shaoxing China Textile City Sports Center outfield, Shaoxing
15:30	Zhang Song 81'		Li Changlian 47'	Attendance: 1,580; Referee: Huang Yi
	Penalties
	Yu Tao (penalty scored); Lü Yongdi (penalty scored); Liu Xiaolong (penalty missed); Wang Tianci (penalty scored); Li Xin (penalty scored)		(penalty scored) Zhang Bo; (penalty scored) Yang Huikang; (penalty scored) Li Changlian; (penalty scored) Wang Yewen; (penalty scored) Wang Lei

19 April 2017	Dalian Boyoung (3)	2–3	Yunnan Lijiang (2)	Jinzhou Stadium, Dalian
15:30	Nan Yunqi 40', 70'		Dai Yuhan 4'; Ha Zhaotong 69'; Huang Da 90+3'	Attendance: 1,012; Referee: Tang Kun

19 April 2017	Chengdu Qbao (3)	1–3	Beijing Renhe (2)	Shuangliu Sports Centre Stadium, Chengdu
15:30	Wu Pan 19'		Yang Yihu 8', 26'; Zhu Baojie 32'	Attendance: 318; Referee: Qiu Zhaojun

19 April 2017	Shenzhen Ledman (3)	0–1	Hangzhou Greentown (2)	Bao'an Stadium, Shenzhen
16:00			Huang Shibo 43'	Attendance: 1,018; Referee: Li Zheng

19 April 2017	Shaanxi Chang'an Athletic (3)	0–1	Qingdao Huanghai (2)	Shaanxi Province Stadium, Xi'an
19:30			Bari 79'	Attendance: 22,166; Referee: Liu Xiufeng

19 April 2017	Suzhou Dongwu (3)	2–0	Meizhou Hakka (2)	Kunshan Stadium, Kunshan
19:30	Wang Feng 27', 80'			Attendance: 817; Referee: Yang Nan

19 April 2017	Nantong Zhiyun (3)	1–2	Shanghai Shenxin (2)	Rudong Olympic Sports Center, Nantong
19:35	Li Jiawei 89'		Zhao Zuojun 3'; Zhang Hao 6'	Attendance: 3,113; Referee: Guo Hao

20 April 2017	Jiangsu Yancheng Dingli (3)	0–0 (4–5 p)	Dalian Yifang (2)	Yancheng Dafeng Olympic Sports Centre, Yancheng
15:00				Attendance: 327; Referee: Liang Caiwei
	Penalties
	(penalty missed) (penalty scored) (penalty scored) (penalty scored); Wang Peng (penalty scored)		(penalty scored) Shan Pengfei; (penalty scored) Sun Guowen; (penalty scored) Han Xu; (penalty scored) Li Shuai; (penalty scored) Zhu Xiaogang

20 April 2017	Meizhou Meixian Techand (3)	4–1	Dalian Transcendence (2)	Meixian Tsang Hin-chi Stadium, Meizhou
19:30	Yang Junjie 28' (pen.), 35', 65' (pen.); Zhang Yong 55'		Wang Guanghao 30'	Attendance: 5,288; Referee: Li Pan

20 April 2017	Shanghai Jiading Boo King (A)	2–1	Wuhan Zall (2)	Jiading Stadium, Shanghai
20:00	Wang Fei 48', 70'		Kang Zhenjie 63'	Attendance: 3,998; Referee: Kou Jianxun

Notes

1. Heilongjiang Lava Spring played at neutral field due to their home stadium was incapable of hosting matches in April.
2. Jilin Baijia was given home advantage according to the rules, but the match was later switched to be hosted by Zhejiang Yiteng.

== Third round ==
Number of teams per tier entering this round
Chinese Super League	China League One	China League Two	China Amateur Football League	Total
16 / 16	9 / 16	6 / 24	1 / 20	32 / 76

2 May 2017	Jilin Baijia (3)	1–4	Shandong Luneng Taishan (1)	Development Area Stadium, Changchun
15:00	Li Changliang 72'		Li Songyi 35'; Cui Wei 39'; Cheng Yuan 52', 83'	Attendance: 2,103; Referee: Luo Haitao

2 May 2017	Yunnan Lijiang (2)	0–3	Shanghai Greenland Shenhua (1)	Lijiang Sports Development Centre Stadium, Lijiang
15:00			Guarín 22'; Martins 33'; Mao Jianqing 88'	Attendance: 3,681; Referee: Zhou Gang

2 May 2017	Meizhou Meixian Techand (3)	1–2	Guangzhou Evergrande Taobao (1)	Meixian Tsang Hin-chi Stadium, Meizhou
19:00	Yang Chen 66'		Liao Lisheng 3'; Gao Lin 45'	Attendance: 14,680; Referee: Shen Yinhao

2 May 2017	Shenzhen FC (2)	0–1	Hebei China Fortune (1)	Shenzhen Stadium, Shenzhen
19:30			Dong Xuesheng 45'	Attendance: 5,361; Referee: Dong Kun

2 May 2017	Suzhou Dongwu (3)	1–1 (3–2 p)	Yanbian Funde (1)	Kunshan Stadium, Kunshan
19:30	Li Haowen 60'		Han Guanghui 90+4' (pen.)	Attendance: 2,200; Referee: Yu Bo
	Penalties
	Dilmurat (penalty scored); Zhang Jinzhe (penalty missed); Wu Hongyang (penalty scored); Li Zhi (penalty missed); Zheng Yi (penalty scored)		(penalty missed) Tian Yinong; (penalty scored) Jin Hongyu; (penalty scored) Jin Bo; (penalty missed) Piao Shihao; (penalty missed) Han Guanghui

2 May 2017	Jiangxi Liansheng (3)	0–1	Jiangsu Suning (1)	Jiujiang Stadium, Jiujiang
19:35			Chen Ji 4'	Attendance: 13,808; Referee: Liu Lin

2 May 2017	Hangzhou Greentown (2)	4–3	Liaoning F.C. (1)	Yellow Dragon Sports Center, Hangzhou
19:35	Luo Jing 4'; Zang Yifeng 12' (pen.), 72', 75'		Tong Lei 2' (o.g.); Sun Zhaoliang 17'; Sang Yifei 21' (pen.)	Attendance: 1,827; Referee: Wu Liying

2 May 2017	Nei Mongol Zhongyou (2)	2–1	Changchun Yatai (1)	Hohhot City Stadium, Hohhot
19:35	Mané 39'; Zuo Yiteng 60' (o.g.)		Bruno Meneghel 26' (pen.)	Attendance: 7,832; Referee: Lin Jun

2 May 2017	Qingdao Huanghai (2)	1–4	Guangzhou R&F (1)	Qingdao Guoxin Stadium, Qingdao
19:35	Verdú 61'		Zahavi 4'; Renaltinho 25'; Zeng Chao 68'; Tang Miao 82'	Attendance: 5,017; Referee: Xia Jun

2 May 2017	Shanghai Jiading Boo King (A)	0–2	Tianjin Teda (1)	Jiading Stadium, Shanghai
20:00			Lei Yongchi 79'; Zhao Yingjie 87' (pen.)	Attendance: 4,720; Referee: Li Pan

3 May 2017	Shanghai Sunfun (3)	1–5	Henan Jianye (1)	Chemical Industry Park Stadium, Shanghai
15:00	Liu Shuai 26' (pen.)		Chen Zijie 14', 83'; Abduwali 24', 34'; Hu Jinghang 90'	Attendance: 400; Referee: Tang Shunqi

3 May 2017	Heilongjiang Lava Spring (3)	1–0	Chongqing Dangdai Lifan (1)	Harbin International Convention Exhibition and Sports Center, Harbin
15:00	Li Xiaoting 32'			Attendance: 6,658; Referee: Chen Xin

3 May 2017	Beijing Renhe (2)	0–5	Beijing Sinobo Guoan (1)	Beijing Fengtai Stadium, Beijing
15:30			Yu Dabao 8'; Soriano 25', 70', 90+1'; Zhang Xizhe 63'	Attendance: 13,856; Referee: Wang Jing

3 May 2017	Dalian Yifang (2)	0–2	Tianjin Quanjian (1)	Dalian Sports Center Stadium, Dalian
15:30			Moraes 52', 77'	Attendance: 2,621; Referee: Ma Li

3 May 2017	Shanghai Shenxin (2)	5–3	Guizhou Hengfeng Zhicheng (1)	Jinshan Sports Centre, Shanghai
19:35	Biro-Biro 10', 85'; Cleiton Silva 29', 66'; Ji Jun 83'		Ilhamjan 51'; Yang Ting 72'; Chery 90+2'	Attendance: 1,087; Referee: Shi Zhenlu

3 May 2017	Shijiazhuang Ever Bright (2)	0–2	Shanghai SIPG (1)	Yutong International Sports Center, Shijiazhuang
19:35			Elkeson 3', 25'	Attendance: 12,626; Referee: Zhao Zhizhi

== Fourth round ==
Number of teams per tier entering this round
Chinese Super League	China League One	China League Two	China Amateur Football League	Total
11 / 16	3 / 16	2 / 24	0 / 20	16 / 76

21 June 2017	Heilongjiang Lava Spring (3)	1–2	Tianjin Quanjian (1)	Harbin International Convention Exhibition and Sports Center, Harbin
15:30	Pan Yuchen 90+1'		Su Yuanjie 40'; Wang Yongpo 76'	Attendance: 12,456; Referee: Dong Kun

21 June 2017	Hangzhou Greentown (2)	1–1 (5–6 p)	Shanghai Shenxin (2)	Zhoushan Sports Center, Zhoushan
16:00	Luo Jing 37' (pen.)		Ji Jun 82'	Attendance: 9,845; Referee: Tang Shunqi
	Penalties
	Anselmo Ramon (penalty scored); Chen Po-liang (penalty scored); Gabionetta (penalty scored); Zang Yifeng (penalty missed); Luo Jing (penalty scored); Ge Zhen (penalty scored); Sun Zheng'ao (penalty missed)		(penalty missed) Liu Yichao; (penalty scored) Pan Chaoran; (penalty scored) Liu Chao; (penalty scored) Zhang Yudong; (penalty scored) Zhang Yifeng; (penalty scored) Hu Mingfei; (penalty scored) Rodríguez

21 June 2017	Nei Mongol Zhongyou (2)	0–0 (3–5 p)	Guangzhou R&F (1)	Hohhot City Stadium, Hohhot
18:00				Attendance: 10,231; Referee: Kou Jianxun
	Penalties
	Dori (penalty scored); Senghor (penalty scored); Luo Andong (penalty missed); Davi (penalty scored)		(penalty scored) Zahavi; (penalty scored) Júnior Urso; (penalty scored) Zhang Chenlong; (penalty scored) Li Tixiang; (penalty scored) Lu Lin

21 June 2017	Suzhou Dongwu (3)	1–1 (14–15 p)	Shanghai SIPG (1)	Suzhou Sports Center, Suzhou
18:00	Bian Jun 45+1'		Wu Lei 90+3'	Attendance: 10,366; Referee: Luo Haitao
	Penalties
	Wu Hongyang (penalty scored); Li Zhi (penalty scored); Zheng Yi (penalty scored); Hao Ming (penalty scored); Chi Xingchen (penalty missed); Gou Junchen (penalty missed); Liu Huan (penalty scored); Xiao Kun (penalty scored); Zhang Jieqi (penalty scored); Tang Jun (penalty scored); Wu Hongyang (penalty scored); Li Zhi (penalty scored); Zheng Yi (penalty scored); Hao Ming (penalty scored); Chi Xingchen (penalty scored); Liu Huan (penalty scored); Xiao Kun (penalty missed)		(penalty scored) Lü Wenjun; (penalty scored) Wu Lei; (penalty scored) Zhang Yi; (penalty scored) Wei Shihao; (penalty missed) Li Shenglong; (penalty missed) Shi Ke; (penalty scored) He Guan; (penalty scored) Fu Huan; (penalty scored) Zhang Wei; (penalty scored) Yan Junling; (penalty scored) Lü Wenjun; (penalty scored) Wu Lei; (penalty scored) Zhang Yi; (penalty scored) Wei Shihao; (penalty scored) Li Shenglong; (penalty scored) Shi Ke; (penalty scored) He Guan

21 June 2017	Tianjin Teda (1)	0–1	Shandong Luneng Taishan (1)	Tuanbo Football Stadium, Tianjin
19:35			Diego Tardelli 32'	Attendance: 7,618; Referee: Li Haixin

21 June 2017	Jiangsu Suning (1)	1–0	Henan Jianye (1)	Nanjing Olympic Sports Centre, Nanjing
19:35	Wu Xi 57'			Attendance: 20,198; Referee: Wu Liying

21 June 2017	Shanghai Greenland Shenhua (1)	1–0	Beijing Sinobo Guoan (1)	Hongkou Football Stadium, Shanghai
20:00	Guarín 52'			Attendance: 15,669; Referee: Shi Zhenlu

21 June 2017	Guangzhou Evergrande Taobao (1)	1–0	Hebei China Fortune (1)	Tianhe Stadium, Guangzhou
20:00	Zheng Long 62'			Attendance: 34,507; Referee: Ma Li

== Fifth round ==
Number of teams per tier entering this round
Chinese Super League	China League One	China League Two	China Amateur Football League	Total
7 / 16	1 / 16	0 / 24	0 / 20	8 / 76

=== 1st leg ===
18 July 2017	Jiangsu Suning (1)	2–2	Shanghai Shenxin (2)	Nanjing Olympic Sports Centre, Nanjing
19:35	Moukandjo 30' (pen.); Ramires 80'		Bai Tianci 66'; Cleiton Silva 87'	Attendance: 11,807; Referee: Gu Chunhan

19 July 2017	Tianjin Quanjian (1)	3–0	Shanghai SIPG (1)	Haihe Educational Football Stadium, Tianjin
18:00	Wang Xiaolong 31'; Pato 73', 87'			Attendance: 25,100; Referee: Ai Kun

19 July 2017	Shandong Luneng Taishan (1)	1–3	Shanghai Greenland Shenhua (1)	Jinan Olympic Sports Center Stadium, Jinan
20:00	Hao Junmin 63'		Martins 3', 30'; Mao Jianqing 68'	Attendance: 24,816; Referee: Ma Ning

19 July 2017	Guangzhou R&F (1)	4–2	Guangzhou Evergrande Taobao (1)	Yuexiushan Stadium, Guangzhou
20:00	Renatinho 9', 69'; Zahavi 45', 52' (pen.)		Zheng Zhi 27'; Alan 85'	Attendance: 12,860; Referee: Fu Ming

=== 2nd leg ===
1 August 2017	Shanghai Shenxin (2)	2–1	Jiangsu Suning (1)	Jinshan Sports Centre, Shanghai
19:35	Biro Biro 5', 54'		Ji Xiang 1'	Attendance: 11,596; Referee: Zhang Long

Shanghai Shenxin won 4–3 on aggregate.

1 August 2017	Guangzhou Evergrande Taobao (1)	7–2	Guangzhou R&F (1)	Tianhe Stadium, Guangzhou
20:00	Muriqui 14', 36'; Alan 23' (pen.), 82'; Yu Hanchao 45+3'; Gao Lin 68'; Zhang Chenglin 75'		Renatinho 7' (pen.); Zahavi 71' (pen.)	Attendance: 42,579; Referee: Ma Ning

Guangzhou Evergrande Taobao won 9–6 on aggregate.

2 August 2017	Shanghai Greenland Shenhua (1)	0–0	Shandong Luneng Taishan (1)	Hongkou Football Stadium, Shanghai
19:35				Attendance: 18,238; Referee: Shi Zhenlu

Shanghai Greenland Shenhua won 3–1 on aggregate.

3 August 2017	Shanghai SIPG (1)	4–0	Tianjin Quanjian (1)	Shanghai Stadium, Shanghai
19:35	Hulk 6', 45+1' (pen.); Oscar 53'; Zheng Zhiyun 70'			Attendance: 25,503; Referee: Fu Ming

Shanghai SIPG won 4–3 on aggregate.

== Semi-finals ==
Number of teams per tier entering this round
Chinese Super League	China League One	China League Two	China Amateur Football League	Total
3 / 16	1 / 16	0 / 24	0 / 20	4 / 76

=== 1st leg ===
15 August 2017	Shanghai Greenland Shenhua (1)	1–0	Shanghai Shenxin (2)	Hongkou Football Stadium, Shanghai
19:35	Kim Kee-hee 54'			Attendance: 18,697; Referee: Huang Yejun

16 August 2017	Shanghai SIPG (1)	2–1	Guangzhou Evergrande Taobao (1)	Shanghai Stadium, Shanghai
19:35	Ahmedov 55'; He Guan 90+1'		Liu Jian 19'	Attendance: 25,503; Referee: Zhao Zhizhi

=== 2nd leg ===
29 September 2017	Shanghai Shenxin (2)	0–1	Shanghai Greenland Shenhua (1)	Jinshan Sports Centre, Shanghai
19:35			Martins 78'	Attendance: 17,939; Referee: Shi Zhenlu

Shanghai Greenland Shenhua won 2–0 on aggregate.

30 September 2017	Guangzhou Evergrande Taobao (1)	1–4	Shanghai SIPG (1)	Tianhe Stadium, Guangzhou
19:35	Gao Lin 10'		Hulk 31'; Wei Shihao 45+2'; Oscar 78', 81'	Attendance: 48,367; Referee: Ma Ning

Shanghai SIPG won 6–2 on aggregate.

== Final ==
Number of teams per tier entering this round
Chinese Super League	China League One	China League Two	China Amateur Football League	Total
2 / 16	0 / 16	0 / 24	0 / 20	2 / 76

=== 1st leg ===
19 November 2017
19:35

Shanghai Greenland Shenhua (1)	1–0	Shanghai SIPG (1)
Martins 38'	Sina Report

Hongkou Football Stadium, Shanghai
Attendance: 24,319
Referee: Jumpei Iida (Japan)

Shanghai Greenland Shenhua	Shanghai SIPG

GK	27	(China) Li Shuai	(yellow card) 90+2'
RB	16	(China) Li Yunqiu
CB	6	(China) Li Peng
CB	34	(China) Bi Jinhao
LB	23	(China) Bai Jiajun
RM	36	(China) Liu Ruofan (U-23)		(substituted off) 65'
CM	26	(China) Qin Sheng
CM	13	(Colombia) Fredy Guarín
LM	28	(China) Cao Yunding	(yellow card) 30'	(substituted off) 76'
AM	10	(Colombia) Giovanni Moreno (c)		(substituted off) 90+1'
CF	17	(Nigeria) Obafemi Martins
Substitutes:
GK	22	(China) Qiu Shengjiong
DF	30	(China) Tao Jin
MF	8	(China) Zhang Lu		(substituted on) 65'
MF	35	(China) Lü Pin (U-23)
MF	37	(China) Sun Shilin		(substituted on) 90+1'
FW	7	(China) Mao Jianqing		(substituted on) 76'
FW	15	(China) Zhu Jianrong
Manager:
(China) Wu Jingui

GK	1	(China) Yan Junling
RB	27	(China) Shi Ke
CB	28	(China) He Guan
CB	13	(China) Wei Zhen (U-23)		(substituted off) 55'
LB	4	(China) Wang Shenchao (c)
RM	8	(Brazil) Oscar	(yellow card) 71'
CM	6	(China) Cai Huikang	(yellow card) 25'	(substituted off) 84'
CM	25	(Uzbekistan) Odil Ahmedov
CM	21	(China) Yu Hai		(substituted off) 46'
LM	7	(China) Wu Lei
CF	10	(Brazil) Hulk	(yellow card) 59'
Substitutes:
GK	22	(China) Sun Le
DF	23	(China) Fu Huan		(substituted on) 55'
MF	18	(China) Zhang Yi
MF	26	(China) Gao Haisheng (U-23)
MF	33	(China) Wei Shihao (U-23)		(substituted on) 46'
FW	14	(China) Li Shenglong
FW	15	(China) Lin Chuangyi		(substituted on) 84'
Manager:
(Portugal) André Villas-Boas

Assistant referees:
Ye Zhi (Shenzhen FA)
Lou Fangping (Chongqing FA)
Fourth official:
Li Haixin (Guangdong FA)

=== 2nd leg ===
26 November 2017
20:00

Shanghai SIPG (1)	3–2	Shanghai Greenland Shenhua (1)
Lü Wenjun 16'; Hulk 72' (pen.); Moreno 77' (o.g.)	Sina Report	Cao Yunding 45'; Martins 67'

Shanghai Stadium, Shanghai
Attendance: 39,552
Referee: Ted Unkel (United States)

Shanghai SIPG	Shanghai Greenland Shenhua

GK	1	(China) Yan Junling
RB	23	(China) Fu Huan	(yellow card) 45+2' (yellow-red card) 90+5'
CB	28	(China) He Guan
CB	13	(China) Wei Zhen (U-23)		(substituted off) 46'
LB	4	(China) Wang Shenchao (c)	(yellow card) 82'
RM	8	(Brazil) Oscar
CM	18	(China) Zhang Yi	(yellow card) 14'	(substituted off) 46'
CM	25	(Uzbekistan) Odil Ahmedov
CM	10	(Brazil) Hulk
LM	7	(China) Wu Lei
CF	11	(China) Lü Wenjun		(substituted off) 77'
Substitutes:
GK	22	(China) Sun Le
DF	27	(China) Shi Ke	(yellow card) 85'	(substituted on) 46'
MF	21	(China) Yu Hai		(substituted on) 77'
MF	6	(China) Cai Huikang
MF	33	(China) Wei Shihao (U-23)		(substituted on) 46'
FW	14	(China) Li Shenglong
FW	15	(China) Lin Chuangyi
Manager:
(Portugal) André Villas-Boas

GK	27	(China) Li Shuai
RB	16	(China) Li Yunqiu
CB	6	(China) Li Peng
CB	34	(China) Bi Jinhao
LB	23	(China) Bai Jiajun	(yellow card) 56'
RM	36	(China) Liu Ruofan (U-23)		(substituted off) 59'
CM	26	(China) Qin Sheng	(yellow card) 20'
CM	13	(Colombia) Fredy Guarín
LM	28	(China) Cao Yunding		(substituted off) 90+5'
AM	10	(Colombia) Giovanni Moreno (c)
CF	17	(Nigeria) Obafemi Martins	(yellow card) 75'	(substituted off) 90+8'
Substitutes:
GK	22	(China) Qiu Shengjiong
DF	30	(China) Tao Jin
MF	8	(China) Zhang Lu		(substituted on) 59'
MF	35	(China) Lü Pin (U-23)
MF	37	(China) Sun Shilin		(substituted on) 90+5'
FW	7	(China) Mao Jianqing		(substituted on) 90+8'
FW	15	(China) Zhu Jianrong
Manager:
(China) Wu Jingui

Assistant referees:
Song Xiangyun (Dalian FA)
Cao Yi (Henan FA)
Fourth official:
Ai Kun (Beijing Sport University)

3–3 on aggregate. Shanghai Greenland Shenhua won on away goals.

== Awards ==
- Top Scorer: (Nigeria) Obafemi Martins (Shanghai Greenland Shenhua) (6 goals)
- Most Valuable Player: (China) Cao Yunding (Shanghai Greenland Shenhua)
- Fair Play Award: Shanghai Shenxin
- Dark Horse Award: Shanghai Shenxin

=== Most Valuable Player of The Round ===
Round	MVP	Club	Ref.
1	(China) Zhang Xunwei	Jiangxi Liansheng	
2	(China) Zhu Zhengyu	Nei Mongol Zhongyou	
3	(Colombia) Fredy Guarín	Shanghai Greenland Shenhua	
4	(China) Tang Jun	Suzhou Dongwu	
QF	(Brazil) Biro Biro	Shanghai Shenxin	
SF	(Nigeria) Obafemi Martins	Shanghai Greenland Shenhua	

== Top scorers ==
Rank	Player	Club	Goals
1	(Nigeria) Obafemi Martins	Shanghai Greenland Shenhua	6
2	(Brazil) Renatinho	Guangzhou R&F	4
2	(Israel) Eran Zahavi	Guangzhou R&F	4
2	(Brazil) Hulk	Shanghai SIPG	4
5	(China) Yang Junjie	Meizhou Meixian Techand	3
5	(China) Zang Yifeng	Hangzhou Greentown	3
5	(Spain) Jonathan Soriano	Beijing Sinobo Guoan	3
5	(Brazil) Cleiton Silva	Shanghai Shenxin	3
5	(Brazil) Alan Carvalho	Guangzhou Evergrande Taobao	3
5	(Brazil) Biro Biro	Shanghai Shenxin	3
5	(China) Gao Lin	Guangzhou Evergrande Taobao	3
5	(Brazil) Oscar	Shanghai SIPG	3
