= Neuritis =

Inflammation of a nerve or generally any part of the nervous system

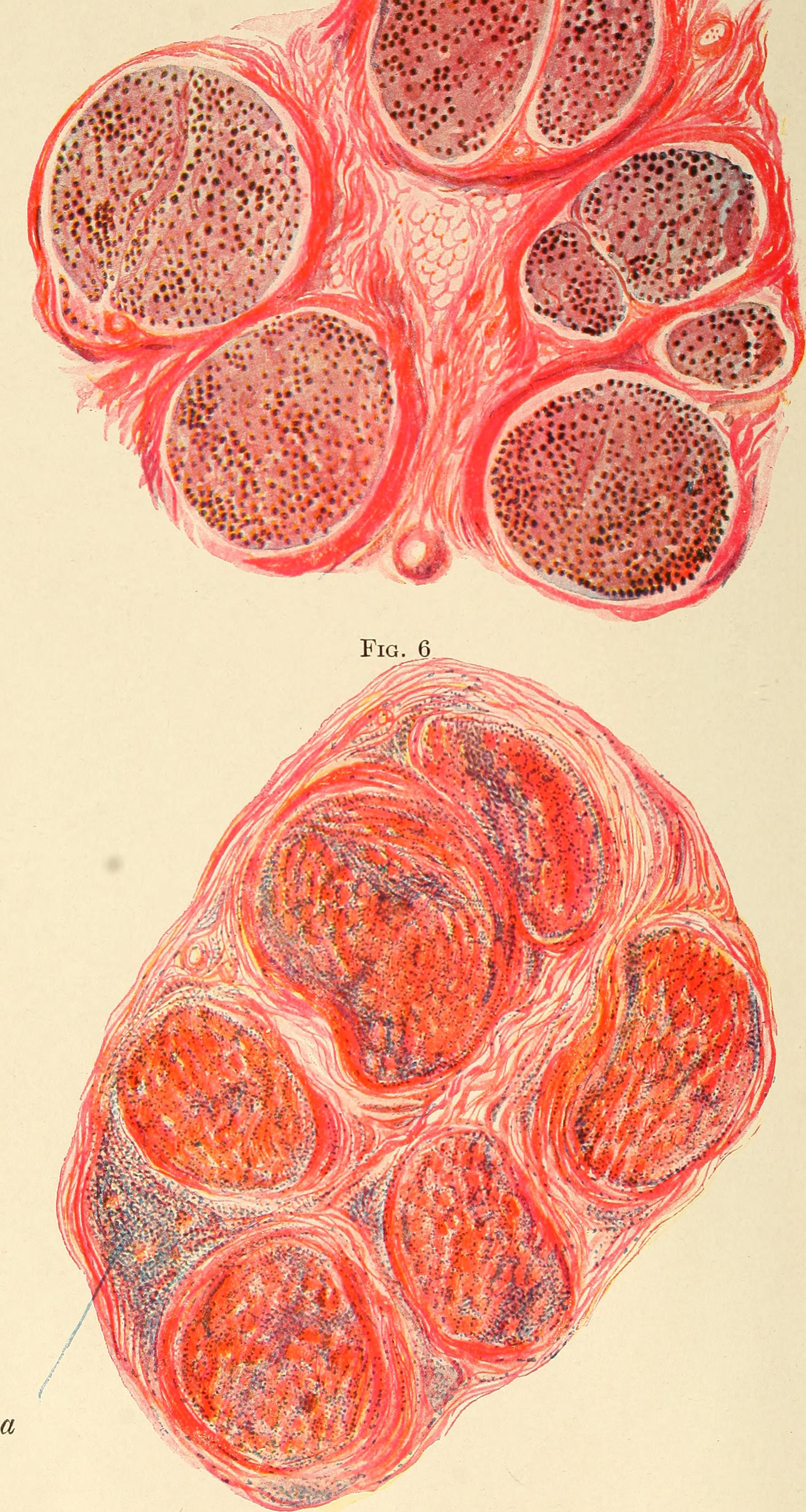
- Sciatic Nerve in acute polyneuritis (top) and Ulnar nerve in polyneuritis leprosa (bottom)
- Specialty: Neurology
- Symptoms: Pain, paresthesia, paresis, anesthesia, paralysis
- Causes: Autoimmune disease, infection, physical injury, paraneoplastic syndrome
- Diagnostic method: Physical exam, electrodiagnostic studies, MRI, nerve biopsy
- Medication: Corticosteroids, Plasmapharesis, IVIG, Gabapentin, Amitriptyline

Neuritis (/njʊəˈraɪtɪs/, from the Greek νεῦρον), is inflammation of a nerve or the general inflammation of the peripheral nervous system. Inflammation, and frequently concomitant demyelination, cause impaired transmission of neural signals and leads to aberrant nerve function.

Neuritis is often conflated with neuropathy, a broad term describing any disease process which affects the peripheral nervous system. However, neuropathies may be due to either inflammatory or non-inflammatory causes, and the term encompasses any form of damage, degeneration, or dysfunction, while neuritis refers specifically to the inflammatory process.

As inflammation is a common reaction to biological insult, many conditions may present with features of neuritis. Common causes include autoimmune diseases, such as multiple sclerosis; infection, either bacterial, such as leprosy, or viral, such as varicella zoster; post-infectious immune reactions, such as Guillain-Barré syndrome; or a response to physical injury, as frequently seen in sciatica.

While any nerve in the body may undergo inflammation, specific etiologies may preferentially affect specific nerves. The nature of symptoms depends on the specific nerves involved, neuritis in a sensory nerve may cause pain, paresthesia (pins-and-needles), hypoesthesia (numbness), and anesthesia, and neuritis in a motor nerve may cause paresis (weakness), fasiculation, paralysis, or muscle wasting.

Treatment of neuritis centers around removing or managing any inciting cause of inflammation, followed by supportive care and anti-inflammatory or immune modulatory treatments as well as symptomatic management.

== Causes ==
=== Infectious ===
Both active infections and post-infectious autoimmune processes cause neuritis. Rapid identification of an infectious cause of neuritis dictates treatment approach and often has a much more positive long term prognosis than other etiologies. Bacterial, viral, and spirochete infections all have been associated with inflammatory neural responses. Some of the bacterial agents most associated with neuritis are leprosy, lyme disease, and diphtheria. Viral causes of neuritis include herpes simplex virus, varicella zoster virus, and HIV.

Leprosy is frequently characterized by direct neural infection by the causative organism, mycobacterium leprae. Leprosy presents with a heterogeneous clinical picture dictated by bacterial titer and inborn host resistance. Tuberculoid leprosy, seen in cases where host immunity is high, is not commonly associated with neuritis. It presents with a low number of anesthetic, anhydrotic skin plaques with few bacilli, the result of a granulomatous process which destroys cutaneous nerves. Lepromatous leprosy, seen when the host lacks resistance to the organism, presents with widespread skin lesions and palpably enlarged nerves. Disease involvement in this form of leprosy characteristically progresses from cooler regions of the body, such as the tip of the nose and ear lobes, towards warmer regions of the body eventually resulting in extensive loss of sensation and destructive skin lesions. Rapid treatment is a critical component of care in patients affected with leprosy, delayed care results in permanent loss of sensation and tissue damage which requires an extensive treatment regime.

Lyme disease, caused by the spirochete Borrelia burgdorferi, is a tick-borne illness with both peripheral and central neurological manifestations. The first stage of Lyme disease frequently presents with a pathognomonic "bull's eye" rash, erythema migrans, as well as fever, malaise, and arthralgias. Roughly 15% of untreated patients will then develop neurological manifestations, classically characterized by cranial neuropathy, radiculoneuritis, and a lymphocytic meningitis. The nerve inflammation seen in neurological lyme disease is associated with a lymphoctyic infiltrate without evidence of direct infection of peripheral nerves. While commonly self-limiting, treatment with antibiotics may hasten resolution of symptoms.

Diphtheria, a once common childhood respiratory infection, produces a neurotoxin which can result in a biphasic neuropathy. This neuropathy begins with paralysis and numbness of the soft palate and pharynx as well as bulbar weakness several days to weeks after the initial upper respiratory infection, followed by an ascending flaccid paralysis caused by an acute inflammatory demyelinating neuropathy after several more weeks. While antibiotics are effective at eradicating the bacterium, neurological sequelae of infection must be treated with diphtheria antitoxin.

Herpes simplex virus is a common virus which latently resides in neuronal ganglia between active infections. HSV-1 commonly resides in cranial nerve ganglia, particularly the trigeminal ganglia, and may cause painful neuralgias during active periods. It has also been associated with Bell's palsy, and vestibular neuritis. HSV-2 frequently lies within lumbosacral ganglia and is associated with radiculopathies during active infection. Herpes reactivation is often treated with acyclovir, although evidence for its efficacy in controlling peripheral neurological manifestation of disease remain poor.

Varicella zoster virus, the cause of chickenpox, can be found dormant throughout the nervous system after an initial infection. Reactivation of the virus cause herpes zoster, commonly known as shingles, is seen in a dermatomal or cranial nerve distribution corresponding to the ganglion in which the latent virus resided. After the herpetic rash resolves, an additional period of postherpetic neuralgia may persist for weeks to months. Antiviral medications, including acyclovir, are effective at controlling viral reactivation. Management of ensuing neuropathic often requires further management possibly including gabapentin, amitriptyline, carbamazepine, or topical lidocaine.

HIV is associated with a broad range of neurological manifestations, both during acute infection and during the progression of the disease. During acute infection, both direct peripheral nervous involvement, most commonly bilateral facial palsy, and an acute inflammatory demyelinating polyneuropathy (Guillian-Barré syndrome) have been reported. As the disease process progresses, diffuse infiltrative lymphocytosis syndrome may include a lymphocytic inflammation of peripheral nerves which results in a painful symmetric polyneuropathy. Immune dysfunction over the course of infection may also result in chronic inflammatory demyelinating polyneuropathy or vasculitis induced mononeuritis multiplex. Identifying HIV-associated neuropathy is confounded by the neurotoxic nature of many of the antiretrovirals used to manage the disease, as a general rule HIV-associated neuropathy will improve with continued antiretroviral therapy while medicated associated neuropathy will worsen.

=== Autoimmune ===
Multiple sclerosis and Neuromyelitis optica are autoimmune diseases which both frequently present with optic neuritis, an inflammatory demyelinating neuropathy of the optic nerve. Multiple sclerosis is a disease of unknown etiology which is characterized by neurological lesions "disseminated in time and space". Neuromyelitis optica, once considered a subtype of multiple sclerosis, is characterized by neuromyelitis optica IgG antibodies which selectively bind to aquaporin-4. Optic neuritis is associated monocular vision loss, often initially characterized by a defect in color perception (dyschromatopsia) followed by blurring of vision and loss of acuity. Optic neuritis is also commonly associated with periocular pain, phosphenes, and other visual disturbances. Treatment of acute optic neuritis involves corticosteroids, plasmapheresis, and IV immunoglobulins in additions to disease modifying immunotherapies to manage the underlying neuropathology associated with the acute inflammatory episode.

Guillian-Barré Syndrome is a class of acute polyneuropathies that present with flaccid paralysis, they include acute inflammatory demyelinating polyradiculoneuropathy (AIDP), acute motor axonal neuropathy (AMAN), acute ataxia, and Miller-Fisher syndrome. These disorders are post-infectious syndromes in which symptoms often present several weeks after the resolution of an acute infection, commonly an upper respiratory infection or gastroenteritis, due to molecular mimicry between peripheral nerve and microbial antigens. AIDP, which represents the vast majority of Guillain-Barré cases, classically presents with an acute onset, ascending paralysis which begins in the distal extremities. This paralysis may progress rapidly over the course of several days and lead to ventilatory failure requiring intubation. Symptoms will commonly spontaneously resolve after several weeks. Thus, management of Guillain-Barré relies upon supportive care to manage ventilation and feeding until symptoms remit. Adjunctive immunomodulation with plasmapharesis and IV immunoglobulin have both been shown to increase the rate of recovery.

Chronic Inflammatory Demyelinating Polyneuropathy (CIDP) is an inflammatory neuropathy, which while pathophysiologically similar to AIDP, progresses over a much more protracted time scale. CIDP has an insidious onset and progresses over months to years, but is otherwise similar to AIDP in serological, CSF, and electrodiagnostic studies. Treatment consists of corticosteroids, with IV immunoglobulon or plasmapheresis as a bridge treatment until symptoms respond to corticosteroids.

=== Paraneoplastic ===
Several different malignancies, particularly small-cell lung cancer and Hodgkin lymphoma, are associated with a paraneoplastic neuritis. This carcinomatous polyneuropathy is associated with the presence of antibodies against onconeural antigen, Hu, Yo, amphiphysin, or CV2/CRMP5, which recognize and bind to both tumor cells and peripheral nervous system neurons. This paraneoplastic syndrome may present as either a sensory neuropathy, affecting primarily the dorsal root ganglion, resulting in a progressive sensory loss associated with painful paresthesias of the upper limbs, or a mixed sensorimotor neuropathy which is also characterized by progressive weakness. Treatment of paraneoplastic syndromes aim for both elimination of tumor tissue via conventional oncologic approach as well as immunotherapy options such as steroids, plasmapheresis or IVIG.

=== Metabolic ===
Metabolic abnormalities and deficiencies in certain vitamin, particularly B vitamins, are associated with inflammatory degeneration of peripheral nerves. Deficiency of vitamin B_{1}, thiamine, causes beriberi which can be associated with a painful sensory neuropathy with muscle weakness and atrophy. Deficiency of niacine, vitamin B_{3}, causes pellagra which can present with various peripheral neuropathies in addition to keratotic skin lesions. Vitamin B_{6}, pyridoxine, has been associated with peripheral nerve damage both in cases of deficiency and excess. Deficiency of vitamin B_{12} causes subacute combined degeneration, a disease classically associated with a central demyelinating process; however, it also presents with a painful peripheral neuropathy. Treatment of vitamin deficiencies focuses around repletion of specific deficiencies, recovery is often prolonged and some of the damage is often permanent.

=== Toxic ===
Many classes of medication may have toxic effects on peripheral nerves, these iatrogenic neuropathies are an increasingly common form of neuritis. Broad categories of medications associated with toxic effects on nerves include: antineoplastic agents, antibiotics, immunosuppressants, and cardiac medications. Management of these medication induced neuropathies center around discontinuation of the offending agents, although patients will frequently continue to worsen for several weeks after cessation of administration.

== Diagnosis ==
The accurate diagnosis and characterization of a neuritis begins with a thorough physical exam to characterize and localize any symptoms to a specific nerve or distribution of nerves. An exam will assess the time course, distribution, and severity and nerve dysfunction as well as whether the disease process involves sensory, motor, or both sensorimotor nerves. After the lesion has been localized, a more focused investigation may use specific techniques appropriate for the involved nerves. Blood tests should be performed to evaluate blood glucose and serum B_{12} levels with metabolites, additional measurement of specific vitamins or toxins may be performed as indicated if the history and physical exam are consistent. Medical tests which are often useful include: nerve biopsy, MRI, electromography, nerve conduction studies. fundoscopy, and lumbar punctures. However, the diagnosis of many of the disorders associated with neuritis is a clinical one which does not rely upon any particular diagnostic test.
