= Yehya Ablikim =

Uyghur-Chinese footballer

Personal information
- Full name: Yehya Ablikim
- Date of birth: 10 October 1988 (age 38)
- Place of birth: Kashgar, Xinjiang, China
- Height: 1.75 m (5 ft 9 in)
- Position: Midfielder

Youth career
- Xinjiang Youth

Senior career*
Years	Team	Apps	(Gls)
2006–2008	Xinjiang Sport Lottery	?	(?)
2010	Liaoning Tiger	?	(?)
2011–2013	Shenzhen Ruby	38	(2)
2014–2020	Xinjiang Tianshan Leopard	100	(0)
- * Club domestic league appearances and goals as of 31 December 2020

Yehya Ablikim (Chinese: 耶和亚·阿布力克木; pinyin: Yēhéyà Ābùlìkèmù; Uyghur: يەھيا ئابلىكىم; born 10 October 1988) is a Chinese footballer.

== Club career ==
Yehya played for China League Two club Xinjiang Sport Lottery between 2006 and 2008. He joined Chinese Super League side Shenzhen Ruby along with his teammate Abduwali Ablet and Dilmurat Batur on 18 March 2011. He made his senior debut on 15 April 2011 in a 2–0 away defeat against Shanghai Shenhua, coming on as a substitute for Li Yang in the 72nd minute. He gradually became the starter of the team and scored his first Super League goal on 28 September 2011, which ensured Shenzhen tied with Liaoning Whowin 1–1. Yehya gained 22 league appearances in the 2011 season, however, Shenzhen Ruby relegated to the second tier by finishing the last place of the league.

Yehya transferred to China League One side Xinjiang Tianshan Leopard in February 2014.

== Career statistics ==
Statistics accurate as of match played 31 December 2020.

Appearances and goals by club, season and competition
Club	Season	League			National Cup		Continental		Other		Total	
Club	Season	Division	Apps	Goals	Apps	Goals	Apps	Goals	Apps	Goals	Apps	Goals
Xinjiang Sport Lottery	2006	China League Two			-		-		-			
Xinjiang Sport Lottery	2007	China League Two			-		-		-			
Xinjiang Sport Lottery	2008	China League Two			-		-		-			
Xinjiang Sport Lottery	Total				0	0	0	0	0	0		
Liaoning Tiger	2010	China League Two			-		-		-			
Shenzhen Ruby	2011	Chinese Super League	22	1	1	0	-		-		23	1
Shenzhen Ruby	2012	China League One	13	1	0	0	-		-		13	1
Shenzhen Ruby	2013	China League One	3	0	0	0	-		-		3	0
Shenzhen Ruby	Total		38	2	1	0	0	0	0	0	39	2
Xinjiang Tianshan Leopard	2014	China League One	24	0	1	0	-		-		25	0
Xinjiang Tianshan Leopard	2015	China League One	17	0	3	0	-		-		20	0
Xinjiang Tianshan Leopard	2016	China League One	2	0	0	0	-		-		2	0
Xinjiang Tianshan Leopard	2017	China League One	8	0	1	0	-		-		9	0
Xinjiang Tianshan Leopard	2018	China League One	7	0	1	0	-		-		8	0
Xinjiang Tianshan Leopard	2019	China League One	28	0	0	0	-		-		28	0
Xinjiang Tianshan Leopard	2020	China League One	14	0	-		-		0 (Note: Appearances in China League One Relegation play-offs)	0	14	0
Xinjiang Tianshan Leopard	Total		100	0	6	0	0	0	0	0	106	0
Career Total			138	2	7	0	0	0	0	0	145	2
