= Parhat =

Parhat may refer to:

- Parhat Azimat (born 1976), Chinese football player
- Hozaifa Parhat (born 1971), Uyghur refugee imprisoned in the US Guantanamo Bay detention camps, petitioner in Parhat v. Gates
