= Gu Gu =

Male giant panda (1999–2025)

Gu Gu 古古
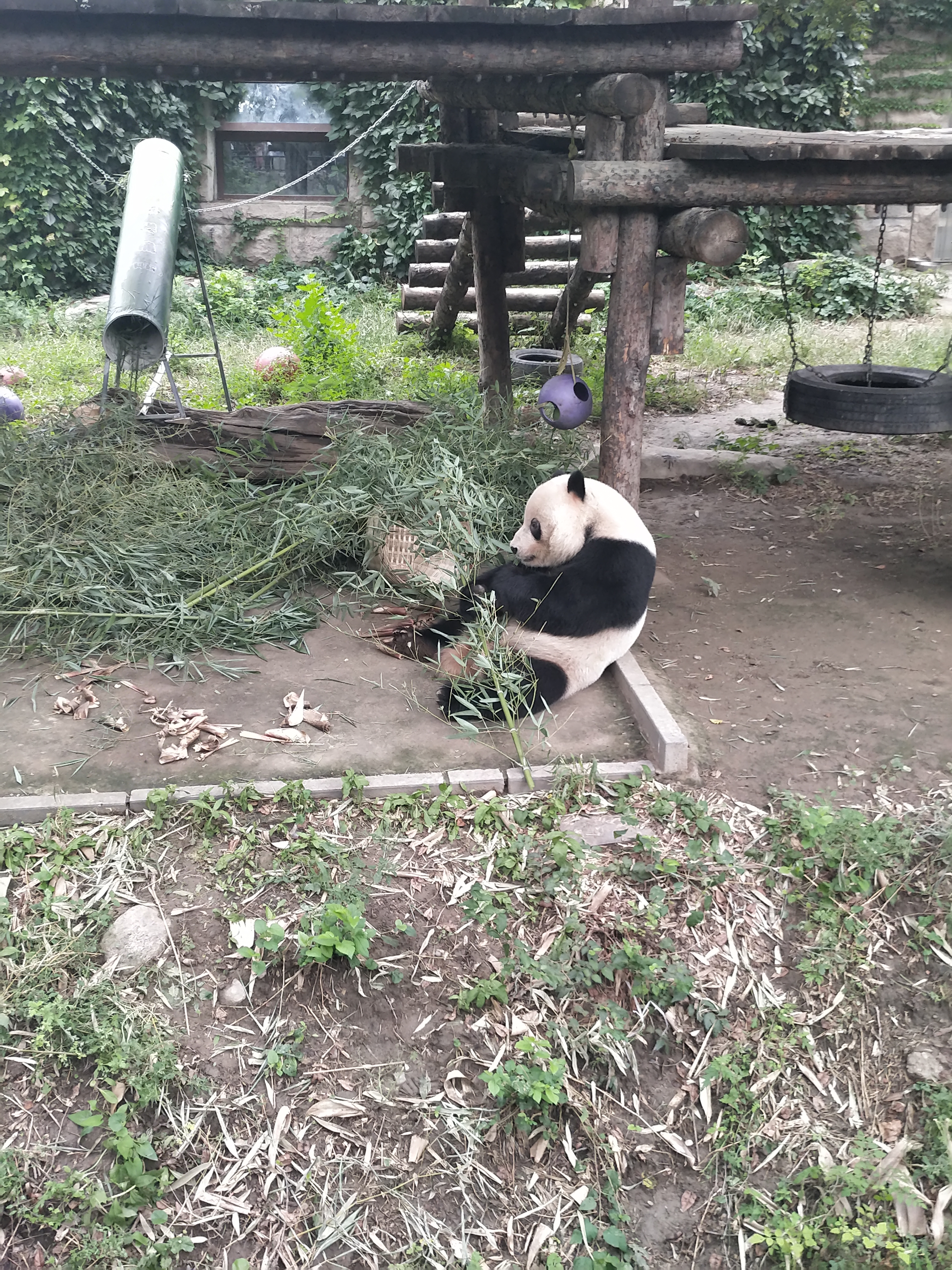
- Gu Gu in 2019
- Species: Giant panda
- Sex: Male
- Born: 25 September 1999
- Died: 16 January 2025 (aged 25); Beijing Zoo, Beijing, China
- Residence: Beijing, China
- Parents: Pan Pan and Tang Tang
- Mate: Ying Hua
- Offspring: Two twins

Gu Gu (Note: Chinese: 古古; pinyin: Gǔ Gǔ) (25 September 1999 – 16 January 2025) was a male giant panda who lived at the Beijing Zoo since 22 October 2004. He received international attention for three incidents between 2006 and 2009 in which he attacked zoo visitors who trespassed into his enclosure. He mated with Ying Hua in July 2010 and fathered twin cubs, one of whom was accidentally crushed to death by its mother. In November 2017, Melania Trump, the First Lady of the United States, visited him while her husband was in Vietnam.

Gu Gu's health began deteriorating on 9 January 2024 due to his age. He was replaced by another giant panda, Pang Dahai, who had moved into his enclosure the following day. The Beijing Zoo stopped reporting on Gu Gu in January 2025, and he died on 16 January 2025 from liver and heart failure.

== Early life ==
Gu Gu was born on 25 September 1999 at the Wolong National Nature Reserve to Pan Pan and Tang Tang. He moved to the Beijing Zoo on 22 October 2004 with two other giant pandas, Da Di (Note: pinyin: Dà Dì) and Ying Hua, (Note: pinyin: Yīng huá) and lived there since.

== Attacks ==
On 19 September 2006, Gu Gu bit a man, Zhang Xinyan, who had jumped into his enclosure while intoxicated, attempting to hug the panda. Zhang, in response, tried to bite Gu Gu but failed, blaming the giant panda's thick fur. Zoo officials sedated Gu Gu by spraying him with water, and Zhang was subsequently hospitalized. The zoo reported that Gu Gu was unharmed apart from a loss of appetite.

A second incident on 23 October 2007 involved 15-year-old Li Xitao, who entered the panda exercise area out of "curiosity" and was bitten by Gu Gu, resulting in severe injuries to both legs. He was taken to Beijing Children's Hospital for treatment. A zoo official, Zhang, emphasized the need for visitors to exercise caution and care around the animals and mentioned that zoo officials were considering measures to prevent future incidents. However, he noted that raising the barrier around the exercise area was not feasible as it would obstruct view of the pandas.

On 7 January 2009, Gu Gu attacked another visitor, Zhang Jiao, who climbed over the barrier into the enclosure to retrieve his son's toy. Zhang sustained damage to major ligaments in his legs and was hospitalized. Zoo workers were forced to use tools to pry Gu Gu's jaws apart when he would not let go of Zhang's legs. On 18 May 2012, Gu Gu attacked a fourth tourist who illegally entered his enclosure, but the wounds were far less severe than those of the previous three incidents. The repeated incidents involving the panda resulted in CNN describing Gu Gu as "not your typical soft and cuddly giant panda". Despite his reputation overseas, HK01 described Gu Gu's personality as docile and tame, and breeders explained that Gu Gu would not attack people unless he was provoked. He was known as "Uncle Gu" and the "God of War" by Chinese-language news outlets.

== Later life ==
On 2 July 2010, Gu Gu and Ying Hua produced a pair of twin cubs, but 20 hours later, the oldest twin was accidentally crushed to death by Ying Hua, prompting Beijing Zoo staff to separate her from her younger twin.

=== Visit by Melania Trump ===
In November 2017, while Donald Trump was in Vietnam for diplomatic purposes, Melania Trump, the First Lady of the United States, visited the Beijing Zoo during a trip to China, where she was allowed to meet and feed Gu Gu and another giant panda, Meng'er. The Guardian referred to the event as an instance of panda diplomacy. She later signed a poster featuring Gu Gu and took pictures with him, and Twitter users pointed out that she was "photobomed" by Meng'er. Her husband tweeted that she would travel to Alaska afterwards.

== Illness and death ==
On 9 January 2024, Gu Gu was moved to a non-public section of the Beijing Zoo to help him cope with medical conditions caused by aging. The following day, a new panda named Pang Dahai (Note: 胖大海; Pàng Dàhǎi; 'Fat Ocean'; "Malva nut") moved to Gu Gu's environment, the Giant Panda Pavilion. The Beijing Zoo stopped updating on Gu Gu's condition in January 2025. He died from heart and liver failure on 16 January 2025 at 2:09 am, at the age of 25. The Beijing Zoo announced his obituary three days later.

== See also ==
- List of individual giant pandas
- List of individual bears
