= Acute motor axonal neuropathy =

- Other names: Acute pure motor Guillain-Barré syndrome
- Specialty: Neurology

Acute motor axonal neuropathy (AMAN) is a variant of Guillain–Barré syndrome. It is characterized by acute paralysis and loss of reflexes without sensory loss. Pathologically, there is motor axonal degeneration with antibody-mediated attacks of motor nerves and nodes of Ranvier.

== Causes ==
A link to Campylobacter jejuni was suspected when a young girl was admitted to Second Teaching Hospital. She had become ill after feeding the family chickens. She developed acute paralysis and respiratory failure. Investigators discovered that several of the chickens in the home displayed similar symptoms and C. jejuni was found in their droppings. Several of the paralysis patients were found to have antibodies to C. jejuni and anti-GD1a antibodies, suggesting a link between the pathogen and the disease. In 2015, Zika virus was linked to AMAN.

== Diagnosis ==
The syndrome typically presents as a progressive flaccid symmetric paralysis with areflexia, often causing respiratory failure. Electromyographic studies and nerve conduction studies show normal motor conduction velocity and latency with decreased amplitude of compound muscle action potentials. Pathologically, it is a noninflammatory axonopathy without demyelination. Antibodies attack the coating of the motor neurons without causing inflammation or loss of myelin. It does not affect sensory neurons, so sensation remains intact despite loss of movement.

== Treatment ==
The majority of patients have complete symptom resolution with 5-day intravenous immunoglobulin (IV Ig) treatment. Patients with AMAN continue to see improvements in ambulation and functional ability up to four years post-diagnosis. "Physiotherapy assessment and treatment can help prevent the decline of functional status and maintain functional independence, muscle strength, posture, balance, and cardio-respiratory fitness."

== History ==
AMAN, also known as Chinese Paralytic Syndrome, was first described by a group of Johns Hopkins University and University of Pennsylvania neurologists in collaboration with neurologists from the Second Teaching Hospital of Hebei Medical School and Beijing Children's Hospital. In 1991, Guy Mckhann, Jack Griffin, Dave Cornblath and Tony Ho from Johns Hopkins University and Arthur Asbury from University of Pennsylvania visited China to study a mysterious epidemic of paralytic syndrome occurring in northern China. Every summer, hundreds of children from rural China developed acute paralysis and respiratory failure. Hospitals were overwhelmed with number of cases and often ran out of ventilators and hospital beds. Examination of these children showed that many of them had acute flaccid paralysis and areflexia but with little or no sensory loss. Electrophysiological testing of these children showed motor axonal loss with occasional conduction block with a lack of demyelinating features and normal sensory potentials. In contrast, the common form of Guillain–Barré syndrome in the West often presents with sensory loss and demyelination on electrophysiology testing and is more common in adults. Later, several autopsies confirmed the focus of the immune attack was at the motor axolemma especially around the nodes of Ranvier. These cases showed deposition of antibody and complement along the motor axolemma and associated macrophage infiltration.
