= Dilmurat Batur =

Chinese footballer

Personal information
- Full name: Dilmurat Batur
- Date of birth: 6 July 1989 (age 37)
- Place of birth: Kashgar, Xinjiang, China
- Height: 1.75 m (5 ft 9 in)
- Position: Midfielder

Youth career
- Xinjiang Youth

Senior career*
Years	Team	Apps	(Gls)
2006–2009	Xinjiang Sport Lottery	?	(?)
2011–2013	Shenzhen Ruby	31	(0)
2014	Al-Oruba	6	(2)
2015–2016	Qingdao Jonoon	18	(0)
2017–2019	Suzhou Dongwu	35	(9)
2019–2021	Shenzhen Bogang	9	(1)
- * Club domestic league appearances and goals as of 24 December 2023

Dilmurat Batur (simplified Chinese: 迪力木拉提·巴吐尔; traditional Chinese: 迪力木拉提·巴吐爾; pinyin: Dílìmùlātí Bātǔěr; Uyghur: دىلمۇرات باتۇر; born 6 July 1989) is a Chinese former footballer who played as midfielder.

== Club career ==
Dilmurat played for China League Two club Xinjiang Sport Lottery between 2006 and 2009. He joined Chinese Super League side Shenzhen Ruby along with his teammate Abduwali Ablet and Yehya Ablikim on 18 March 2011. He made his senior debut on 10 April 2011 in a 1-0 home defeat against Shaanxi Renhe, coming on as a substitute for Seiichiro Maki in the 60th minute. Dilmurat played as a regular substitute player in the 2011 season, gaining 17 league appearances, however, Shenzhen Ruby relegated to the second tier by finishing the last place of the league.

In January 2014, he moved to Oman and signed a six-month contract with Al-Oruba on a free transfer.

On 4 February 2015, Dilmurat transferred to China League One side Qingdao Jonoon.

== Career statistics ==
As of 13 October 2018

Club performance			League		Cup		Super Cup		Continental		Total	
Season	Club	League	Apps	Goals	Apps	Goals	Apps	Goals	Apps	Goals	Apps	Goals
China PR			League		FA Cup		Super Cup		Asia		Total	
2011	Shenzhen Ruby	Chinese Super League	17	0	1	0	-		-		18	0
2012	Shenzhen Ruby	China League One	13	0	0	0	-		-		13	0
2013	Shenzhen Ruby	China League One	1	0	1	0	-		-		2	0
Oman			League		Cup		Super Cup		AFC Cup		Total	
2013-2014	Al-Oruba	Professional League	6	2	0	0	0	0	-		6	2
China PR			League		FA Cup		Super Cup		Asia		Total	
2015	Qingdao Jonoon	China League One	14	0	3	1	-		-		17	1
2016	Qingdao Jonoon	China League One	4	0	2	0	-		-		6	0
2017	Suzhou Dongwu	China League Two	23	5	3	0	-		-		26	5
2018	Suzhou Dongwu	China League Two	12	4	0	0	-		-		12	4
Career Total			90	11	10	1	0	0	0	0	100	12
