= Abduwali Ablet =

Uyghur-Chinese footballer

Personal information
- Full name: Abduwali Ablet
- Date of birth: 17 April 1987 (age 39)
- Place of birth: Karamay, Xinjiang, China
- Height: 1.81 m (5 ft 11 in)
- Position: Left-back

Youth career
- Xinjiang Youth

Senior career*
Years	Team	Apps	(Gls)
2006–2008	Xinjiang Sport Lottery	?	(?)
2010	Liaoning Tiger	?	(?)
2011	Shenzhen Ruby	8	(0)
2012–2021	Henan Jianye	97	(0)
2022	Xinjiang Alar 359		
2023	Xi'an Chongde Ronghai		
- * Club domestic league appearances and goals as of 27 May 2022

Abduwali Ablet (Chinese: 阿布都外力·阿布来提; pinyin: Ābùdūlāwàilì Ābùláití; born 17 April 1987) is a Chinese footballer.

== Club career ==
Abduwali played for China League Two club Xinjiang Sport Lottery between 2006 and 2008. On 18 March 2011, he joined Chinese Super League side Shenzhen Ruby along with his teammate Dilmurat Batur and Yehya Ablikim. He made his senior debut on 29 April 2011 in a 2–0 away defeat against Hangzhou Greentown. Abduwali gained 8 league appearances in his debut season, however, Shenzhen Ruby relegated to the second tier by finishing the last place of the league.

Abduwali transferred to another Super League club Henan Jianye in February 2012. On 25 March, he made his debut for Henan in a 3–0 away league defeat against Guangzhou Evergrande. In September 2014, Abduwali was suspended temporary by the Chinese Football Association due to a positive sample test for Clenbuterol, which may be the result of mistaking beef with Clenbuterol. He returned to field without charge in the 2015 season.

== Career statistics ==
As of 31 December 2020.

Appearances and goals by club, season and competition
Club	Season	League			National Cup		Continental		Other		Total	
Club	Season	Division	Apps	Goals	Apps	Goals	Apps	Goals	Apps	Goals	Apps	Goals
Xinjiang Sport Lottery	2006	China League Two			-		-		-			
Xinjiang Sport Lottery	2007	China League Two			-		-		-			
Xinjiang Sport Lottery	2008	China League Two			-		-		-			
Xinjiang Sport Lottery	Total				0	0	0	0	0	0		
Liaoning Tiger	2010	China League Two			-		-		-			
Shenzhen Ruby	2011	Chinese Super League	8	0	1	0	-		-		9	0
Henan Jianye	2012	Chinese Super League	4	0	1	0	-		-		5	0
Henan Jianye	2013	China League One	9	0	2	0	-		-		11	0
Henan Jianye	2014	Chinese Super League	5	0	2	0	-		-		7	0
Henan Jianye	2015	Chinese Super League	12	0	3	0	-		-		15	0
Henan Jianye	2016	Chinese Super League	18	0	3	0	-		-		21	0
Henan Jianye	2017	Chinese Super League	18	0	1	2	-		-		19	2
Henan Jianye	2018	Chinese Super League	2	0	0	0	-		-		2	0
Henan Jianye	2019	Chinese Super League	14	0	0	0	-		-		14	0
Henan Jianye	2020	Chinese Super League	15	0	1	0	-		-		16	0
Henan Jianye	Total		97	0	13	2	0	0	0	0	110	2
Career Total			105	0	14	2	0	0	0	0	119	2

== Honours ==
=== Club ===
Henan Jianye

- China League One: 2013
