= Bari Mamatil =

Uyghur-Chinese footballer

Bari Mohamedali 巴力·买买提伊力 بارى مەمتىلى
Personal information
- Full name: Bari Mohamedali
- Date of birth: 27 January 1989 (age 37)
- Place of birth: Fuyun County, Xinjiang, China
- Height: 1.75 m (5 ft 9 in)
- Positions: Winger; right-back

Senior career*
Years	Team	Apps	(Gls)
2007–2009	Xinjiang Sport Lottery	?	(13)
2010–2012	Hangzhou Greentown	54	(7)
2013–2015	Jiangsu Sainty	17	(0)
2014	→ Xinjiang Tianshan Leopard (loan)	16	(3)
2016–2021	Qingdao FC	111	(5)
2022	Xinjiang Tianshan Leopard	1	(0)
- * Club domestic league appearances and goals as of 14 September 2022

Bari Mohamedali (simplified Chinese: 巴力·买买提伊力; traditional Chinese: 巴力·買買提伊力; pinyin: Bālì Mǎimǎitíyīlì; Uyghur: بارى مەمتىلى) is a Chinese former footballer who played most recently as a winger or right-back for Xinjiang Tianshan Leopard in China League One.

On 10 September 2024, Chinese Football Association announced that Bari was banned from football-related activities for lifetime for involving in match-fixing.

== Club career ==
Bari was born in Fuyun, Xinjiang where both his parents worked for the local Mining Bureau, despite their meagre salary they actively encouraged their sons football development by building a small football pitch for him to train on as well as paying for football lessons. His parents encouragement would see Bari play for the Xinjiang Song Qingling Football School where he was soon scouted by the Xinjiang Men's Football Team to participate in the 2005 National Games of China. After the tournament the local Xinjiang football authority decided to participate in the 2006 professional Chinese football leagues where they entered a team called Xinjiang Sport Lottery in the third tier and used the squad that participated in the 2005 National Games of China. In the 2007 league season Bari was promoted to the senior team and aided the club to a promotion play-off position where they were knocked out in the quarter-finals. The following season saw Xinjiang unable to improve on their previous seasons results and also fail in reaching the 2009 National Games of China, which saw the management decide to disband the team.

Bari would be scouted by the football coach Wu Jingui during the 2009 National Games of China preliminary's and once he joined top tier club Hangzhou Greentown as their Head coach he would make Bari one of his first signings. He would make his debut on 27 March 2010 against Shandong Luneng where he came on as a substitute for Fan Xiaodong in a league game that ended in a 4-2 defeat. At Hangzhou Greentown Bari would be converted from a striker into a winger and go on to score his goal for the club in a league game against Henan Jianye on 31 October 2010 in a 2-0 victory. In his debut season for the club he would help guide the team to their highest position of fourth within the league and participation in the 2011 Asian Champions League while also going on to score his first continental goal in the opening game of the group stage against Nagoya Grampus scoring in their 2-0 win. On 25 October 2012, Hangzhou Greentown announced that Bari's contract with the club was terminated for disciplinary reasons, predominantly relating to absence and lateness, however Bari would claim he was involved in a contract dispute.

He then signed with Jiangsu Sainty for the 2013 season. In February 2014，Bari moved to China League One side Xinjiang Tianshan Leopard on a one-year loan deal. On 29 January 2016, Bari transferred to China League One club Qingdao Huanghai.

== Career statistics ==
Statistics accurate as of match played 31 December 2020.

Appearances and goals by club, season and competition
Club	Season	League			National Cup		Continental		Other		Total	
Club	Season	Division	Apps	Goals	Apps	Goals	Apps	Goals	Apps	Goals	Apps	Goals
Xinjiang Sport Lottery	2007	China League Two			-		-		-			
Xinjiang Sport Lottery	2008	China League Two			-		-		-			
Xinjiang Sport Lottery	Total			13	0	0	0	0	0	0		13
Hangzhou Greentown	2010	Chinese Super League	16	1	-		-		-		16	1
Hangzhou Greentown	2011	Chinese Super League	21	3	0	0	5	1	-		26	4
Hangzhou Greentown	2012	Chinese Super League	17	3	1	0	-		-		18	3
Hangzhou Greentown	Total		54	7	1	0	5	1	0	0	60	8
Jiangsu Sainty	2013	Chinese Super League	11	0	1	0	2	0	1 (Note: Appearances in Chinese FA Super Cup)	0	15	0
Jiangsu Sainty	2015	Chinese Super League	6	0	2	1	-		-		8	1
Jiangsu Sainty	Total		17	0	3	1	2	0	1	0	23	1
Xinjiang Tianshan Leopard (loan)	2014	China League One	16	3	0	0	-		-		16	3
Qingdao Huanghai	2016	China League One	20	1	1	0	-		-		21	1
Qingdao Huanghai	2017	China League One	21	2	1	1	-		-		22	3
Qingdao Huanghai	2018	China League One	29	0	1	0	-		-		30	0
Qingdao Huanghai	2019	China League One	27	1	0	0	-		-		27	1
Qingdao Huanghai	2020	Chinese Super League	14	1	1	0	-		-		15	1
Qingdao Huanghai	Total		111	5	4	1	0	0	0	0	115	6
Career total			198	28	8	2	7	1	1	0	214	31

== Honours ==
=== Club ===
Jiangsu Sainty

- Chinese FA Cup: 2015
- Chinese FA Super Cup: 2013

Qingdao Huanghai

- China League One: 2019
