= Lü Pin (footballer) =

Chinese footballer

Personal information
- Full name: Lü Pin
- Date of birth: 3 May 1995 (age 31)
- Place of birth: Wuhan, Hubei, China
- Height: 1.73 m (5 ft 8 in)
- Position: Midfielder

Team information
- Current team: Changchun Yatai
- Number: 18

Youth career
- 2006–2009: Shandong Luneng
- Shanghai Luckystar
- 2014–2016: Shanghai Shenhua

Senior career*
Years	Team	Apps	(Gls)
2015	→ CF Crack's (loan)	0	(0)
2015–2016	→ Atlético Museros (loan)	8	(0)
2016	→ Atlético Saguntino (loan)	0	(0)
2016–2017	→ Olímpic (loan)	0	(0)
2017–2022	Shanghai Shenhua	6	(0)
2019	→ Suzhou Dongwu (loan)	9	(1)
2021	→ Zibo Cuju (loan)	27	(4)
2022	→ Guangxi Pingguo Haliao (loan)	24	(3)
2023–2025	Guangxi Pingguo	34	(3)
2025	→ Dalian K'un City (loan)	5	(0)
2026–	Changchun Yatai	0	(0)

International career^{‡}
2013–2014	China U19	9	(1)
2016	China U22	3	(0)
- * Club domestic league appearances and goals as of 5 November 2023 ‡ National team caps and goals as of 13 November 2016

Lü Pin (simplified Chinese: 吕品; traditional Chinese: 呂品; pinyin: Lǚ Pǐn; born 3 May 1995) is a Chinese footballer who currently plays for Changchun Yatai in the China League One.

== Club career ==
Lü Pin joined Chinese Super League side Shanghai Shenhua's youth academy from Shanghai Luckystar in 2014. He started his professional football career in 2015 when he was loaned to Shanghai Shenhua's satellite team CF Crack's in the Primera Regional of Valencia. He was loaned to another satellite team Atlético Museros for the 2015–16 season. In July 2016, he was loaned to Segunda División B side Atlético Saguntino for one season. He was then loaned to Tercera División side Olímpic after failing to establish himself at Atlético Saguntino.

Lü was promoted to Shanghai Shenhua's first team squad in 2017 by Gus Poyet. He made his debut for Shanghai Shenhua on 2 May 2017 in the third round of 2017 Chinese FA Cup against Yunnan Lijiang in a 3–0 win. On 30 June 2017, he made his league debut in an 8–1 win over Liaoning FC.

== Career statistics ==
As of 5 November 2023.

Appearances and goals by club, season and competition
Club	Season	League			National Cup		Continental		Other		Total	
Club	Season	Division	Apps	Goals	Apps	Goals	Apps	Goals	Apps	Goals	Apps	Goals
CF Crack's (loan)	2014–15	Regional Preferente (Valencia)	0	0	-		-		-		0	0
Atlético Museros (loan)	2015–16	Regional Preferente (Valencia)	8	0	-		-		-		8	0
Atlético Saguntino (loan)	2016–17	Segunda División B	0	0	0	0	-		-		0	0
Olímpic (loan)	2016–17	Tercera División	0	0	0	0	-		-		0	0
Shanghai Shenhua	2017	Chinese Super League	5	0	1	0	0	0	-		6	0
Shanghai Shenhua	2018	Chinese Super League	0	0	0	0	1	0	0 (Note: Appearances in Chinese FA Super Cup)	0	1	0
Shanghai Shenhua	2020	Chinese Super League	1	0	0	0	0	0	-		1	0
Shanghai Shenhua	Total		6	0	1	0	1	0	0	0	8	0
Suzhou Dongwu (loan)	2019	China League Two	9	1	0	0	-		-		9	1
Zibo Cuju (loan)	2021	China League One	27	4	1	1	-		-		28	5
Guangxi Pingguo Haliao (loan)	2022	China League One	24	3	2	0	-		-		26	3
Guangxi Pingguo Haliao	2023	China League One	27	3	0	0	-		-		27	3
Career total			101	11	4	1	1	0	0	0	106	12

== Honours ==
=== Club ===
Shanghai Shenhua

- Chinese FA Cup: 2017
