= Zhang Jinzhe =

Chinese pediatrician (1920–2022)

- 张金哲
- Born: 25 September 1920; Ninghe County, Hebei, China
- Died: 24 December 2022 (aged 102); Beijing, China
- Education: Yenching University; Peking Union Medical College; St. John's University, Shanghai; Shanghai Medical College of Fudan University
- Scientific career
- Fields: Pediatrics
- Workplaces: Beijing Children's Hospital Affiliated to Capital Medical University

Chinese name
- Simplified Chinese: 张金哲
- Traditional Chinese: 張金哲
Transcriptions
Standard Mandarin
- Hanyu Pinyin: Zhāng Jīnzhé

Zhang Jinzhe (Chinese: 张金哲; 25 September 1920 – 24 December 2022) was a Chinese pediatrician, and an academician of the Chinese Academy of Engineering.

Zhang was a member of the 7th and 8th National Committee of the Chinese People's Political Consultative Conference.

== Biography ==
Zhang was born in Ninghe County (now Ninghe District of Tianjin), Hebei, on 25 September 1920. He attended Tianjin Yaohua High School, and graduated from Yenching University, Peking Union Medical College, St. John's University, Shanghai, and Shanghai Medical College.

Since June 1947, Zhang successively served as attending surgeon, teaching assistant, lecturer, associate professor at the Affiliated Hospital to Medical College of Peking University. From 1951 to 1953, he worked as a surgeon in the Korean battlefield during the Korean War. In June 1955, he was recruited by the newly founded Beijing Children's Hospital, and worked until 2011, when he was transferred to the Beijing Hu Yamei Children's Medical Research Institute as its president. He joined the Chinese Communist Party (CCP) in December 1956.

On 24 December 2022, Zhang died in Beijing, at the age of 102.

== Honours and awards ==
- 1997 Member of the Chinese Academy of Engineering (CAE)
- 2002 Honorary Fellow of the Royal College of Surgeons (RCS)
