= Hu Yamei =

Chinese medical scientist

- Born: April 27, 1923; Beijing, China
- Died: October 3, 2019 (aged 96); Beijing, China
- Education: Yenching University; Peking University
- Scientific career
- Fields: Pediatric hematology
- Workplaces: Beijing Children's Hospital

Chinese name
- Traditional Chinese: 胡亞美
- Simplified Chinese: 胡亚美
Transcriptions
Standard Mandarin
- Hanyu Pinyin: Hú Yàměi

Hu Yamei (Chinese: 胡亚美; 27 April 1923 – 3 October 2019) was a Chinese physician and medical researcher. She served as President of Beijing Children's Hospital, and co-founded Beijing Hu Yamei Children's Medical Research Institute (BHI). She was an academician of the Chinese Academy of Engineering. A specialist in the treatment of pediatric leukemia, she cured more than 700 children.

== Biography ==
Hu was born into a wealthy businessman's family on April 27, 1923. In 1941 she was accepted to Yenching University, and transferred to Peking University in March of the following year. In 1946, she joined the underground organization of the Chinese Communist Party (CCP). Shortly after joining the Communist Party, she came to practice at the Beijing Private Children's Hospital. Hu has pioneered research on childhood leukemia in China since 1976., when she was 53 years old. In 1981, Hu became president of Beijing Children's Hospital, a affiliated hospital of the Capital Normal University. Hu was elected an academician of the Chinese Academy of Engineering (CAE) in 1994. In 2011, Hu founded the Beijing Hu Yamei Children's Medical Research Institute (BHI) with academician Zhang Jinzhe. On August 6, 2009, the then Premier Wen Jiabao visited her in Beijing. Hu died of illness in Beijing, aged 96.

Hu was a delegate to the 7th, 8th, 9th and 10th National People's Congress. Hu was also a delegate to the 12th and 13th National Congress of the Chinese Communist Party.

== Awards ==
- Title of March 8th Red Banner
- May 1st Labor Medal

Educational offices
| Preceded by Zhu Futang | President of Beijing Children's Hospital; 1982–1989 | Succeeded by Li Zhongzhi (李仲智) |
