= Zhu Futang =

Chinese pediatrician (1899–1994)

- Born: November 28, 1899; Wuxi, Jiangsu, Qing dynasty
- Died: April 23, 1994 (aged 94); Beijing, China
- Education: Peking Union Medical College; State University of New York
- Medical career
- Institutions: Peking Union Medical College Hospital; Beijing Children's Hospital
- Sub-specialties: Pediatrics

Zhu Futang (simplified Chinese: 诸福棠; traditional Chinese: 諸福棠; Wade–Giles: Chu Fu-t'ang; November 28, 1899 – April 23, 1994) was a Chinese pediatrician known for his research on the prevention of measles. He is considered the founder of modern Chinese pediatrics.

== Biography ==
Zhu's aunt Zhu Xixian (Chinese: 諸希賢), an educator, had a major influence in Zhu's childhood.

He studied at Peking Union Medical College under Luther Emmett Holt. Upon graduation in 1927, he studied at the State University of New York in the United States, where he earned his M.D. From 1931 to 1933, Zhu went to the Department of Pediatrics, Harvard Medical School for advanced training and research.

In 1955, Zhu was elected an academician of the Chinese Academy of Sciences.

== Scientific papers ==
- Sex, Age and Seasonal Distribution of Tetany in the Orphanages in Peking, American Journal of the Medical Sciences. 177(4):559-563, April 1929.
- Use of the Placental Extract in Prevention and Modification of Measles, Am J Dis Child. 45(3):475-479, March 1933.

== Notable students ==
Hu Yamei, academician of the Chinese Academy of Engineering

== Family ==
Zhu's grandfather was a TCM physician, while his father was a primary school teacher. Zhu married Zhu Ding (Chinese: 朱定) in 1924. She died of liver cancer in 1982.
