= Diffuse infiltrative lymphocytosis syndrome =

- Specialty: Immunology
- Symptoms: Parotitis, cervical lymphadenopathy, dry eyes, dry mouth
- Diagnostic method: Based on symptoms, confirmation of HIV infection (serology), confirmation of organ infiltration by CD8+ T cells (tissue biopsy), and exclusion of other autoimmune conditions
- Differential diagnosis: Primary Sjogren's Syndrome, IgG4-related disease, chronic hepatitis C infection, chronic HTLV1 infection, chronic graft versus host disease, and immune reconstitution inflammatory syndrome
- Treatment: Highly active antiretroviral therapy (HAART) and as-needed steroids

Diffuse infiltrative lymphocytosis syndrome (DILS) is a rare multi-system complication of HIV believed to occur secondary to an abnormal persistence of the initial CD8+ T cell expansion that regularly occurs in an HIV infection. This persistent CD8+ T cell expansion occurs in the setting of a low CD4+/CD8+ T cell ratio and ultimately invades and destroys tissues and organs resulting in the various complications of DILS. DILS classically presents with bilateral salivary gland enlargement (parotitis), cervical lymphadenopathy, and sicca symptoms such as xerophthalmia (dry eyes) and xerostomia (dry mouth), but it may also involve the lungs, nervous system, kidneys, liver, digestive tract, and muscles. Once suspected, current diagnostic workups include (1) confirming HIV infection, (2) confirming six or greater months of characteristic signs and symptoms, (3) confirming organ infiltration by CD8+ T cells, and (4) exclusion of other autoimmune conditions. Once the diagnosis of DILS is confirmed, management includes highly active antiretroviral therapy (HAART) and as-needed steroids. With proper treatment, the overall prognosis of DILS is favorable.

== Signs and symptoms ==
The most common clinical features of DILS are bilateral salivary gland enlargement (parotitis), cervical lymphadenopathy, and sicca symptoms such as dry eyes and dry mouth. Although the swelling of the salivary glands is classically bilateral, it can present unilaterally as well. Although less common than glandular features, extraglandular characteristics can present in DILS and affect the lungs, nervous system, kidneys, liver, digestive tract, and muscles.

For lung involvement, the classic presentation is lymphocytic interstitial pneumonia which may be asymptomatic or present with fever, weight loss, chronic dry cough, or progressive exertional dyspnea (shortness of breath). On physical exam, a physician may note clubbing or crackles on pulmonary auscultation.

For nervous system involvement, potential complications include facial nerve palsy, aseptic meningitis, and peripheral neuropathy.

For kidney involvement, the most common sequela is lymphocytic interstitial nephropathy which occurs in approximately 6%-8% of patients with DILS. The severity and presentation are varied but include acute kidney injury, renal tubular acidosis, mild proteinuria, hematuria (blood in the urine), or nephromegaly (kidney enlargement).

For liver involvement, patients with DILS may develop hepatomegaly (enlarged liver) or lymphocytic hepatitis which can progress to liver failure with portal hypertension and ascites.

For muscle involvement, those with DILS may develop DILS-associated myositis.

== Cause ==
DILS occurs exclusively in HIV-positive patients, especially those with uncontrolled infections.

There is an association of DILS with HLA-DR5 as well as HLA-DRB1 alleles that express the ILEDE amino acid sequence such as HLA-DRB1*1102, HLA-DRB1*1301, and HLA-DRB1*1302.

== Pathophysiology ==
While the pathophysiology of DILS has not been fully determined, it is hypothesized that the initial CD8+ T cell expansion that normally occurs in an HIV infection abnormally persists in DILS and eventually leads to tissue and organ infiltration and destruction. This infiltration is thought to occur due to the secretion of cytokines by HIV-infected monocytes that stimulate endothelial and ductal cells causing them to express proteins such as ICAM-1 which then induce the migration of CD8+ T cells.

== Diagnosis ==
Patients with DILS will be HIV-positive and characteristically have CD8+T cell tissue and organ infiltration in the setting of a CD8+ T cell expansion with a low CD4+/CD8+ T cell ratio. Although a diagnostic workup has not been finalized, the suggested diagnostic workup includes (1) confirming HIV infection, (2) confirming six or greater months of characteristic signs and symptoms, (3) evidence of organ infiltration by CD8+ T cells, and (4) exclusion of other autoimmune conditions. HIV infection can be confirmed with detection of viral load or positive HIV serology. Labial salivary gland biopsy with immunohistochemistry is most commonly used to confirm organ infiltration by CD8+ T cells. It will usually demonstrate periductal CD8+ T cell infiltration with ductal atypia, acinar atrophy, fibrosis, and a focus score greater than or equal to one. Common tests to exclude autoimmune conditions include screening for complement activity, cryoglobulin levels, IgG4 and IgE levels, and levels of several autoantibodies including anti-nuclear antibody (ANA), SS-A (Ro), SS-B (La), and rheumatoid factor (RF). Additionally, other viral infections such as hepatitis C, Epstein–Barr virus, and HTLV-1 should be tested for and excluded.

=== Differential Diagnosis ===
The differential diagnosis of DILS includes primary Sjogren's Syndrome, IgG4-related disease, chronic hepatitis C infection, chronic HTLV1 infection, chronic graft versus host disease, and immune reconstitution inflammatory syndrome.

== Management ==
The gold standard treatment of DILS is highly active antiretroviral therapy (HAART). Additionally, a short course of oral steroids may be used to quicken the improvement in symptomatic patients. For those with kidney or central nervous system involvement, an intravenous steroid may be used before an oral steroid.

== Prognosis ==
The overall prognosis of DILS is favorable as it is not commonly a cause of death and is associated with decreased rates of progression to AIDS, less opportunistic infections, and lower HIV disease stage when compared to HIV-positive patients without DILS. Although treatment with HAART and steroids is commonly effective, DILS can persist or relapse despite appropriate management.

== Epidemiology ==
The estimated prevalence of DILS among those infected with HIV is approximately 3% to 7.8%. However, this may be an underestimation as the clinical presentation has evolved with the use of antiretrovirals and may no longer align with initial descriptions of its symptomatology. Since the development and utilization of HAART, the incidence and prevalence of DILS have decreased.

Africa has the highest prevalence of DILS worldwide. Black people are most commonly affected by DILS.

== History ==
DILS was first discovered in 1985 when a subset of HIV-infected patients was noted to have enlargement of their lymph nodes and salivary glands. However, it was not given the name of diffuse infiltrative lymphocytosis syndrome until 1989.
