= Biro Biro (footballer, born 1994) =

Brazilian footballer (born 1994)

Personal information
- Full name: Diego Santos Gama Camilo
- Date of birth: 22 November 1994 (age 31)
- Place of birth: Queimados, Brazil
- Height: 1.64 m (5 ft 5 in)
- Position: Forward

Team information
- Current team: Nova Iguaçu

Youth career
- 2011–2013: Nova Iguaçu
- 2012–2013: → Fluminense (loan)

Senior career*
Years	Team	Apps	(Gls)
2012–2015	Fluminense	40	(3)
2015	→ Ponte Preta (loan)	44	(13)
2016–2018	Shanghai Shenxin	62	(33)
2019	São Paulo	2	(0)
2019	Nova Iguaçu	0	(0)
2019	→ Botafogo (loan)	0	(0)
Total		121	(43)
- * Club domestic league appearances and goals

Diego Santos Gama Camilo (born 22 November 1994), commonly known as Biro Biro, is a Brazilian former professional footballer who plays as a forward.

== Career statistics ==
Appearances and goals by club, season and competition
Club	Season	League			State League		Cup		Continental		Other		Total	
Club	Season	Division	Apps	Goals	Apps	Goals	Apps	Goals	Apps	Goals	Apps	Goals	Apps	Goals
Fluminense	2012	Série A	1	0	—		—		—		—		1	0
Fluminense	2013	Série A	24	3	1	0	1	0	0	0	—		26	3
Fluminense	2014	Série A	5	0	9	0	1	0	—		—		15	0
Fluminense	Total		30	3	10	0	2	0	0	0	—		42	3
Ponte Preta (loan)	2015	Série A	29	7	15	6	1	0	0	0	—		45	13
Shanghai Shenxin	2016	China League One	29	18	—		1	0	—		—		30	18
Shanghai Shenxin	2017	China League One	22	10	—		4	4	—		—		26	14
Shanghai Shenxin	2018	China League One	11	0	—		1	0	—		—		12	5
Shanghai Shenxin	Total		62	33	—		6	4	—		—		67	37
São Paulo	2019	Série A	0	0	2	0	0	0	0	0	—		2	0
Career total			121	43	27	6	9	4	0	0	0	0	157	50
