= Liu Yichao =

Chinese footballer

Liu Yichao 刘亦超
Personal information
- Full name: Liu Yichao
- Date of birth: 17 August 1995 (age 31)
- Place of birth: Shanghai, China
- Height: 1.83 m (6 ft 0 in)
- Positions: Midfielder; left-back

Team information
- Current team: Shanghai Shenxin
- Number: 55

Youth career
- 2014–2015: Shanghai Shenxin

Senior career*
Years	Team	Apps	(Gls)
2015–	Shanghai Shenxin	36	(0)
- * Club domestic league appearances and goals as of 3 November 2018

Liu Yichao (born 17 August 1995, in Shanghai) is a Chinese footballer who currently plays for Shanghai Shenxin in the China League One.

== Club career ==
In July 2015, Liu Yichao started his professional footballer career with Shanghai Shenxin in the Chinese Super League. On 18 October 2015, Liu made his debut for Shanghai Shenxin in the 2015 Chinese Super League against Chongqing Lifan, coming on as a substitute for Zhang Wentao in the 71st minute.

== Career statistics ==
Statistics accurate as of match played 3 November 2018.

Club performance			League		Cup		League Cup		Continental		Total	
Season	Club	League	Apps	Goals	Apps	Goals	Apps	Goals	Apps	Goals	Apps	Goals
China PR			League		FA Cup		CSL Cup		Asia		Total	
2015	Shanghai Shenxin	Chinese Super League	2	0	0	0	-		-		2	0
2016	Shanghai Shenxin	China League One	8	0	2	0	-		-		10	0
2017	Shanghai Shenxin	China League One	8	0	7	0	-		-		15	0
2018	Shanghai Shenxin	China League One	18	0	1	0	-		-		19	0
Total	China PR		36	0	10	0	0	0	0	0	46	0
