= Li Zhi (footballer) =

Chinese association football player

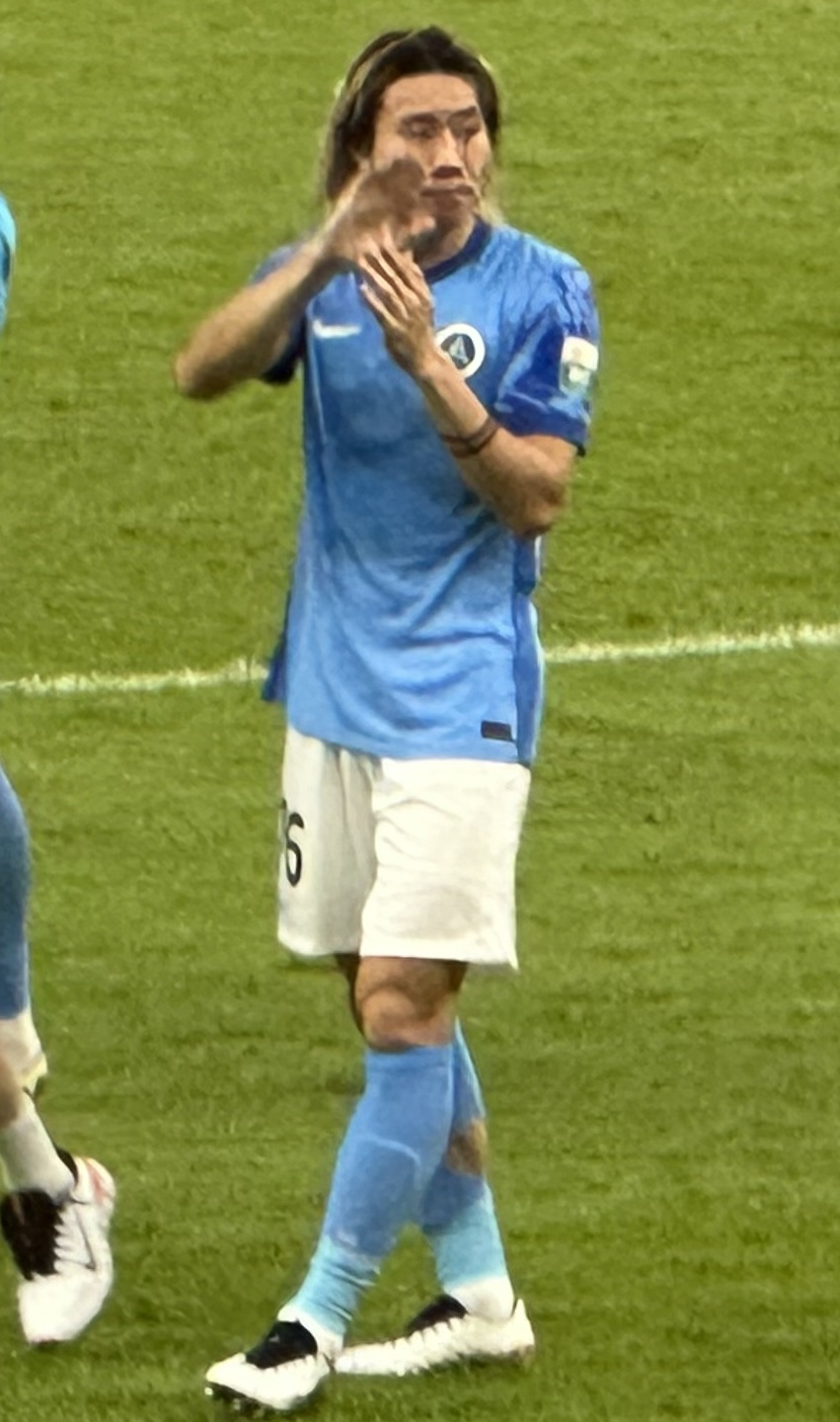
- Li Zhi in April 2025

Personal information
- Date of birth: 29 July 1993 (age 33)
- Place of birth: Beijing
- Height: 1.78 m (5 ft 10 in)
- Position: Left-back

Team information
- Current team: Jiangxi Dingnan United
- Number: 16

Senior career*
Years	Team	Apps	(Gls)
2015–2016	Jingtie Locomotive	27	(2)
2017–2020	Suzhou Dongwu	83	(3)
2021–2022	Chengdu Rongcheng	16	(0)
2022	→ Kunshan FC (loan)	27	(1)
2023–2025	Shenzhen Peng City	62	(2)
2026–	Jiangxi Dingnan United	0	(0)
- * Club domestic league appearances and goals as of 28 August 2025

Li Zhi (Chinese: 李智; born 29 July 1993) is a Chinese professional footballer currently playing as a left-back for Jiangxi Dingnan United.

== Club career ==
Li Zhi would start his senior career with third tier football club Jingtie Locomotive in the 2015 China League Two campaign. The following season he would establish himself as a regular, however at the end of the campaign the club dissolved from the professional league. Li would be free to join another third tier club in Suzhou Dongwu where he established himself as their first choice left-back while he aided them to gain promotion.

On 12 April 2021, he transferred to second tier club in Chengdu Rongcheng. He would make his debut on 26 April 2021 in a league game against Jiangxi Beidamen, which ended in a 4-2 victory. At the end of the season he would establish himself as a regular within the team and aid them to promotion at the end of the 2021 league campaign. Despite the promotion, Li was loaned out to second tier club Kunshan FC where he established himself as regular within the team that won the division and promotion to the top tier at the end of the 2022 China League One campaign. However, the club was disbanded prior to the 2023 Chinese Super League season.

=== Sichuan Jiuniu/Shenzhen Peng City ===
On 21 April 2023, Li joined fellow China League One club Sichuan Jiuniu. He won the 2023 China League One with Jiuniu and achieved a unique feat in helping 3 different clubs achieve promotion to the Chinese top tier in 3 consecutive seasons. The club moved to Shenzhen and renamed as Shenzhen Peng City before the 2024 Chinese Super League season started. On 9 April 2024, he finally made his Chinese Super League debut and scored a direct free kick in a 2-1 shock away win at Beijing Guoan.

=== Jiangxi Dingnan United ===
On 8 February 2026, Li joined China League One club Jiangxi Dingnan United.

== Career statistics ==
As of match played 31 December 2024.

Appearances and goals by club, season and competition
Club	Season	League			National Cup		Continental		Other		Total	
Club	Season	Division	Apps	Goals	Apps	Goals	Apps	Goals	Apps	Goals	Apps	Goals
Jingtie Locomotive	2015	China League Two	8	0	0	0	-		-		8	0
Jingtie Locomotive	2016	China League Two	19	2	1	0	-		-		20	2
Jingtie Locomotive	Total		27	2	1	0	0	0	0	0	28	2
Suzhou Dongwu	2017	China League Two	20	0	4	0	-		-		24	0
Suzhou Dongwu	2018	China League Two	22	0	3	0	-		-		25	0
Suzhou Dongwu	2019	China League Two	28	1	0	0	-		-		28	1
Suzhou Dongwu	2020	China League One	13	2	1	0	-		-		14	2
Suzhou Dongwu	Total		83	3	8	0	0	0	0	0	91	3
Chengdu Rongcheng	2021	China League One	16	0	3	0	-		0 (Note: Appearance(s) in CSL Relegation play-offs)	0	19	0
Kunshan FC (loan)	2022	China League One	27	1	1	0	-		-		28	1
Sichuan Jiuniu/ Shenzhen Peng City	2023	China League One	26	1	1	0	-		-		27	1
Sichuan Jiuniu/ Shenzhen Peng City	2024	Chinese Super League	22	1	2	0	-		-		24	1
Sichuan Jiuniu/ Shenzhen Peng City	Total		48	2	3	0	0	0	0	0	51	2
Career total			201	8	16	0	0	0	0	0	217	8

== Honours ==
=== Club ===
Kunshan FC

- China League One: 2022

Sichuan Jiuniu

- China League One: 2023
