= Jin Hongyu =

Chinese footballer

Jin Hongyu 김홍우 金弘宇
Personal information
- Date of birth: 23 April 1989 (age 37)
- Place of birth: Changchun, Jilin, China
- Height: 1.85 m (6 ft 1 in)
- Position: Defender

Youth career
- Changchun Yatai
- Yanbian FC

Senior career*
Years	Team	Apps	(Gls)
2011–2017	Yanbian FC	21	(0)
2018	Jilin Baijia	17	(0)
2019–2020	Qingdao Jonoon	4	(0)
- * Club domestic league appearances and goals as of 31 December 2020

Jin Hongyu
- Simplified Chinese: 金弘宇
Transcriptions
Standard Mandarin
- Hanyu Pinyin: Jīn Hóngyǔ
- IPA: [tɕín.xʊ̌ŋ.ỳ]

Chinese Korean name
- Chosŏn'gŭl: 김홍우
Transcriptions
- Revised Romanization: Gim Hongu
- McCune–Reischauer: Kim Hongu

Jin Hongyu (Chinese: 金弘宇; Korean: 김홍우; born 23 April 1989) is a Chinese footballer.

== Club career ==
Jin Hongyu started his professional football career in 2011 when he was promoted to Yanbian FC's first squad. On 2 April 2016, Jin made his Super League debut in a 1–0 home victory against Beijing Guoan, coming on as a substitute for Jiang Hongquan in the 93rd minute.

In February 2018, Jin transferred to China League Two side Jilin Baijia. In February 2019, Jin transferred to fellow League Two side Qingdao Jonoon.

== Career statistics ==
Statistics accurate as of match played 31 December 2020.

Appearances and goals by club, season and competition
Club	Season	League			National Cup		Continental		Other		Total	
Club	Season	Division	Apps	Goals	Apps	Goals	Apps	Goals	Apps	Goals	Apps	Goals
Yanbian FC	2011	China League One	1	0	0	0	-		-		1	0
Yanbian FC	2012	China League One	1	0	0	0	-		-		1	0
Yanbian FC	2013	China League One	5	0	1	0	-		-		6	0
Yanbian FC	2014	China League One	8	0	1	0	-		-		9	0
Yanbian FC	2015	China League One	1	0	1	0	-		-		2	0
Yanbian FC	2016	Chinese Super League	2	0	1	0	-		-		3	0
Yanbian FC	2017	Chinese Super League	3	0	1	0	-		-		4	0
Yanbian FC	Total		21	0	5	0	0	0	0	0	26	0
Jilin Baijia	2018	China League Two	17	0	2	0	-		-		19	0
Qingdao Jonoon	2019	China League Two	4	0	3	0	-		-		7	0
Qingdao Jonoon	2020	China League Two	0	0	-		-		-		0	0
Qingdao Jonoon	Total		4	0	3	0	0	0	0	0	7	0
Career total			42	0	10	0	0	0	0	0	52	0

== Honours ==
=== Club ===
Yanbian FC

- China League One: 2015
