= Zuo Yiteng =

Chinese footballer

Zuo Yiteng 左伊藤
Personal information
- Date of birth: 4 April 1995 (age 31)
- Place of birth: Beijing, China
- Height: 1.79 m (5 ft 10 in)
- Position: Defender

Team information
- Current team: Changzhi Huicheng

Youth career
- 2006–2015: Changchun Yatai

Senior career*
Years	Team	Apps	(Gls)
2016–2023	Changchun Yatai	4	(0)
2020	→ Xi'an UKD	0	(0)
2023	Changzhi Huicheng	0	(0)
- * Club domestic league appearances and goals as of 31 January 2023

Zuo Yiteng (Chinese: 左伊藤; born 4 April 1995 in Beijing) is a Chinese footballer who currently plays as a defender for Changzhi Huicheng.

== Club career ==
Zuo Yiteng joined Chinese Super League side Changchun Yatai's youth academy in 2006. He was promoted to first squad in 2016. On 17 April 2016, he made his debut for Changchun Yatai in the 2016 Chinese Super League against Chongqing Lifan.

== Career statistics ==
Statistics accurate as of match played 31 January 2023.

Appearances and goals by club, season and competition
Club	Season	League			National Cup		Continental		Other		Total	
Club	Season	Division	Apps	Goals	Apps	Goals	Apps	Goals	Apps	Goals	Apps	Goals
Changchun Yatai	2016	Chinese Super League	4	0	0	0	-		-		4	0
Changchun Yatai	2017	Chinese Super League	0	0	1	0	-		-		1	0
Changchun Yatai	2018	Chinese Super League	0	0	0	0	-		-		0	0
Changchun Yatai	2019	China League One	0	0	2	0	-		-		2	0
Changchun Yatai	Total		4	0	3	0	0	0	0	0	7	0
Xi'an UKD	2020	China League Two	0	0	-		-		-		0	0
Changzhi Huicheng	2023	Chinese Champions League	0	0	-		-		-		0	0
Career total			4	0	3	0	0	0	0	0	7	0
