= Parhat Azimat =

Chinese footballer

Parhat Azimat ﭘﺎﺭﮬﺎﺕ ﺋﺎﺯﺋﻤﺎﺕ 帕尔哈提·阿孜买提
Personal information
- Date of birth: February 17, 1976 (age 50)
- Place of birth: Urumqi, Xinjiang, China
- Height: 1.81 m (5 ft 11 in)
- Position: Center back

Senior career*
Years	Team	Apps	(Gls)
1990–1993	FC Kairat		
1994–1995	Dalian Wanda		
1996–1997	Foshan Fosti		
1998–2000	Xiamen Yuanhua		

Managerial career
- 2002–2021: Xinjiang U20 (assistant)
- 2006–2008: Xinjiang Sport Lottery (assistant)
- 2008: Xinjiang Sport Lottery
- 2017–2018: China U19 (assistant)
- 2022: Xinjiang Tianshan Leopard
- 2025–: Xinjiang Silk Road Eagle
- * Club domestic league appearances and goals as of March 28, 2009

Parhat Azimat (Uyghur: ﭘﺎﺭﮬﺎﺕ ﺋﺎﺯﺋﻤﺎﺕ; Chinese: 帕尔哈提·阿孜买提; born February 17, 1976) is a Chinese football coach and retired football player. He was born and raised in his native Xinjiang.

He began playing professionally in Kazakhstan in 1990.

Parhat's popularity in Xinjiang football has been compared to that of Fan Zhiyi in Shanghai.

He coached the Xinjiang men's under-20 team at the 2021 National Games of China. He has also coached Xinjiang Tianshan Leopard

== Honours ==
In 2021, Parhat was nominated for a "China's Golden Coach" award.

=== Club ===
==== FC Kairat ====
- Kazakhstan Premier League Champions(1):1992
- Kazakhstan Cup Champions(1):1992

==== Dalian Wanda FC ====
- Chinese Jia-A League Champions(1):1994

==== Xiamen Yuanhua ====
- Chinese Jia-B League Champions(1):1999
