= Liu Shuai =

Chinese footballer

Liu Shuai 刘帅
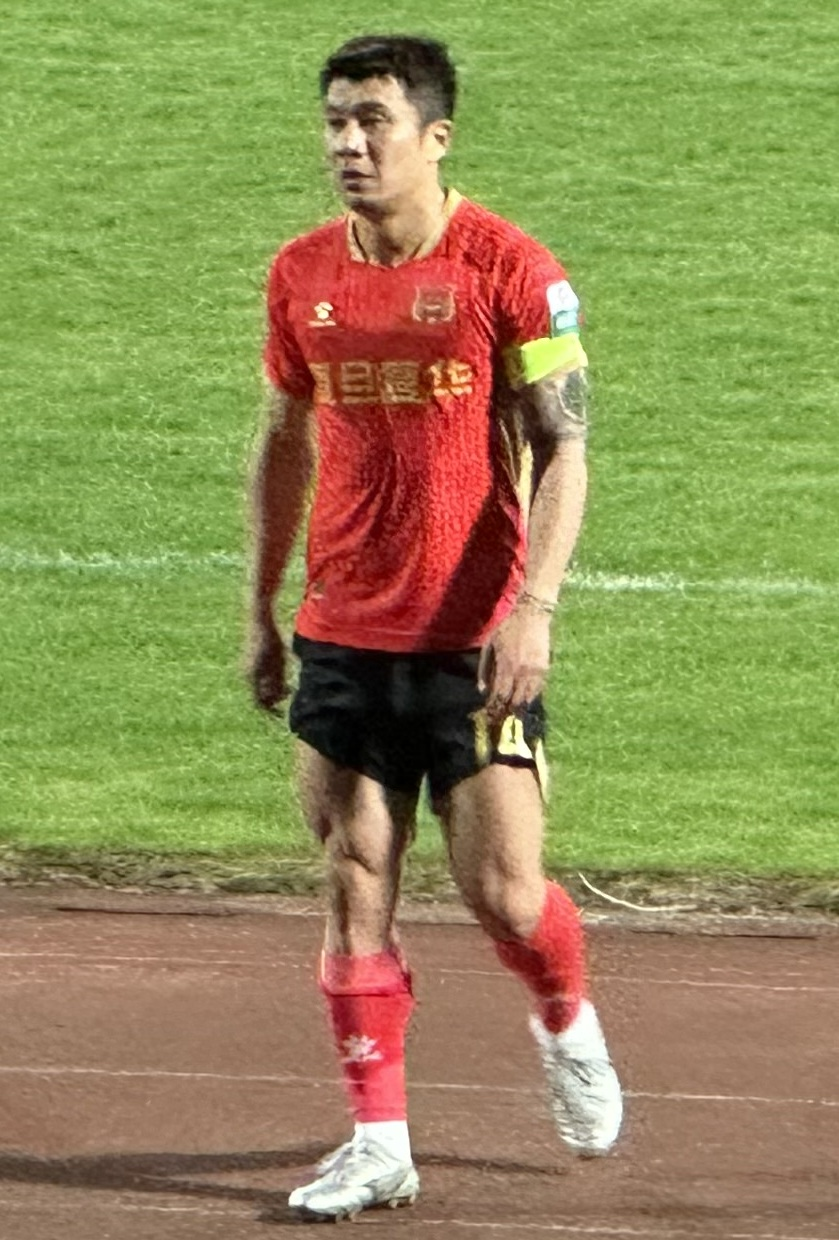
- Liu Shuai in May 2025

Personal information
- Date of birth: April 2, 1989 (age 37)
- Place of birth: Bengbu, Anhui, China
- Height: 1.78 m (5 ft 10 in)
- Position: Defender

Team information
- Current team: Guangdong Mingtu
- Number: 21

Senior career*
Years	Team	Apps	(Gls)
2009–2016	Shenzhen Ruby	46	(1)
2012	→ Shenzhen Main Sports (loan)	13	(1)
2017	Shanghai Sunfun	22	(0)
2018	Shenzhen Ledman	23	(1)
2019–2021	Shenzhen Bogang	6	(0)
2021–2026	Ningbo FC	119	(4)
2026–	Guangdong Mingtu	0	(0)
- * Club domestic league appearances and goals as of 31 December 2025

Liu Shuai (Chinese: 刘帅; born 2 April 1989 in Anhui) is a Chinese football player who currently plays for China League Two side Guangdong Mingtu.

== Club career ==
In 2009, Liu Shuai started his professional footballer career with Shenzhen Ruby in the Chinese Super League. He would eventually make his league debut for Shenzhen on 23 October 2010 in a game against Tianjin Teda. In 2012, he was loaned to China League Two side Shenzhen Main Sports until 31 December.

In March 2017, Liu transferred to League Two side Shanghai Sunfun. In March 2018, Liu transferred to Shenzhen Ledman.

On 7 August 2026, liu Liu transferred to China League Two side Guangdong Mingtu.

== Career statistics ==
Statistics accurate as of match played 31 December 2025.

Club	Season	League			National Cup		Continental		Other		Total	
Club	Season	Division	Apps	Goals	Apps	Goals	Apps	Goals	Apps	Goals	Apps	Goals
Shenzhen Ruby	2009	Chinese Super League	0	0	-		-		-		0	0
Shenzhen Ruby	2010	Chinese Super League	3	1	-		-		-		3	1
Shenzhen Ruby	2011	Chinese Super League	9	0	0	0	-		-		9	0
Shenzhen Ruby	2013	China League One	27	0	1	0	-		-		28	0
Shenzhen Ruby	2014	China League One	7	0			-		-		7	0
Shenzhen Ruby	2015	China League One	0	0	1	0	-		-		1	0
Shenzhen Ruby	2016	China League One	0	0	0	0	-		-		0	0
Shenzhen Ruby	Total		46	1	2	0	0	0	0	0	48	1
Shenzhen Main Sports (loan)	2012	China League Two	13	1	0	0	-		-		13	1
Shanghai Sunfun	2017	China League Two	22	0	3	2	-		-		25	2
Shenzhen Ledman	2018	China League Two	23	1	1	0	-		-		24	1
Shenzhen Bogang	2019	Chinese Champions League	-		-		-		-		0	0
Shenzhen Bogang	2020	China League Two	6	0	-		-		-		6	0
Shenzhen Bogang	Total		6	0	0	0	0	0	0	0	6	0
Shanghai Jiading Huilong/ Ningbo FC	2021	China League Two	19	1	0	0	-		-		19	1
Shanghai Jiading Huilong/ Ningbo FC	2022	China League One	22	0	0	0	-		-		22	0
Shanghai Jiading Huilong/ Ningbo FC	2023	China League One	26	1	0	0	-		-		26	1
Shanghai Jiading Huilong/ Ningbo FC	2024	China League One	24	0	1	0	-		-		25	0
Shanghai Jiading Huilong/ Ningbo FC	2025	China League One	28	2	0	0	-		-		28	2
Shanghai Jiading Huilong/ Ningbo FC	Total		119	4	1	0	0	0	0	0	120	4
Career total			229	7	7	2	0	0	0	0	236	9
