= Zhang Yi (footballer) =

Chinese footballer

Zhang Yi 张一
Personal information
- Date of birth: 17 August 1993 (age 33)
- Place of birth: Jingzhou, Hunan, China
- Height: 1.81 m (5 ft 11 1/2 in)
- Position: Midfielder

Youth career
- Shanghai Dongya

Senior career*
Years	Team	Apps	(Gls)
2011–2012	Shanghai Zobon	?	(?)
2013–2023	Shanghai SIPG	31	(1)
2022	→ Tianjin Jinmen Tiger (loan)	0	(0)
2023	→ Jinan Xingzhou (loan)	3	(0)
- * Club domestic league appearances and goals as of 28 April 2022

Zhang Yi (Chinese: 张一; born 17 August 1993) is a Chinese football player.

== Club career ==
Zhang started his professional football career in 2011 when he was loaned to Shanghai Zobon's squad for the 2011 China League Two campaign. He joined Chinese Super League's newcomer Shanghai Dongya in 2013. He eventually made his league debut for Shanghai East Asia on 30 April 2014 in a game against Guangzhou Evergrande. On 11 November 2018, he scored his first senior goal in a 3–2 away defeat against Tianjin Quanjian.

== Career statistics ==
Statistics accurate as of match played 1 January 2022.

Appearances and goals by club, season and competition
Club	Season	League			National Cup		Continental		Other		Total	
Club	Season	Division	Apps	Goals	Apps	Goals	Apps	Goals	Apps	Goals	Apps	Goals
Shanghai Zobon	2011	China League Two			-		-		-			
Shanghai Zobon	2012	China League Two			-		-		-			
Shanghai Zobon	Total				0	0	0	0	0	0		
Shanghai SIPG	2013	Chinese Super League	0	0	0	0	-		-		0	0
Shanghai SIPG	2014	Chinese Super League	3	0	1	0	-		-		4	0
Shanghai SIPG	2015	Chinese Super League	0	0	0	0	-		-		0	0
Shanghai SIPG	2016	Chinese Super League	1	0	0	0	1	0	-		2	0
Shanghai SIPG	2017	Chinese Super League	13	0	5	0	3	0	-		21	0
Shanghai SIPG	2018	Chinese Super League	8	1	1	0	4	0	-		13	1
Shanghai SIPG	2019	Chinese Super League	5	0	2	0	3	0	0 (Note: Appearances in Chinese FA Super Cup)	0	10	0
Shanghai SIPG	2020	Chinese Super League	0	0	0	0	1	0	-		1	0
Shanghai SIPG	2021	Chinese Super League	1	0	0	0	-		-		1	0
Shanghai SIPG	Total		31	1	9	0	12	0	0	0	52	1
Career total			31	1	9	0	12	0	0	0	52	1

== Honours ==
=== Club ===
Shanghai SIPG

- Chinese Super League: 2018
