= Sun Zhaoliang =

Chinese footballer

Sun Zhaoliang 孙兆靓
Personal information
- Date of birth: 28 May 1996 (age 30)
- Place of birth: Shenyang, Liaoning, China
- Height: 1.86 m (6 ft 1 in)
- Position: Forward

Team information
- Current team: Lijiang Yuanheng

Youth career
- 2009–2011: Changchun Yatai
- 2011–2012: Pombal
- 2012–2014: Real Massamá
- 2014–2015: Sacavenense

Senior career*
Years	Team	Apps	(Gls)
2015-2017	Oriental Dragon		
2015–2016	→ Pinhalnovense (loan)	2	(0)
2016	→ Torreense (loan)	2	(0)
2017–2019	Liaoning F.C.	44	(3)
2020	Kunshan F.C.	1	(0)
2022-	Lijiang Yuanheng	0	(0)
- * Club domestic league appearances and goals as of 17 May 2022

Sun Zhaoliang (simplified Chinese: 孙兆靓; traditional Chinese: 孫兆靚; pinyin: Sūn Zhàoliàng; born 28 May 1996) is a Chinese footballer who plays as a forward for Lijiang Yuanheng.

== Career ==
Sun Zhaoliang went to Portugal for further training as a part of the Chinese Football Association's Project in 2011. He played for Pombal, Real Massamá and Sacavenense's youth academy between 2011 and 2015. Sun made his senior debut with Campeonato de Portugal club Pinhalnovense in the 2015–16 season. He moved to fellow Campeonato de Portuga side União Torreense in July 2016.

On 24 January 2017, Sun returned to China and signed a contract with his hometown club Liaoning F.C. in the Chinese Super League. He made his debut for Liaoning on 21 April 2017 in a 2–1 away defeat against Guangzhou Evergrande as the benefit of the new rule of the league that at least one Under-23 player must be in the starting line-up and was substituted off in the 18th minute. In January 2018, his former club Changchun Yatai submitted a claim to the Chinese Football Association for his ownership.

== Career statistics ==
As of match played 31 December 2020

Appearances and goals by club, season and competition
Club	Season	League			National cup		Continental		Other		Total	
Club	Season	Division	Apps	Goals	Apps	Goals	Apps	Goals	Apps	Goals	Apps	Goals
Pinhalnovense	2015–16	Campeonato de Portugal	2	0	0	0	–		–		2	0
União Torreense	2016–17	Campeonato de Portugal	2	0	0	0	–		–		2	0
Liaoning F.C.	2017	Chinese Super League	15	0	1	0	–		–		16	0
Liaoning F.C.	2018	China League One	12	0	2	0	–		–		14	0
Liaoning F.C.	2019	China League One	16	3	0	0	–		1 (Note: Appearance(s) in CL1 Relegation play-offs)	0	17	3
Liaoning F.C.	Total		43	3	3	0	0	0	1	0	47	3
Kunshan F.C.	2020	China League One	1	0	1	0	–		–		2	0
Career total			48	0	4	0	0	0	1	0	53	3
