= Beijing Children's Hospital =

Beijing Children's Hospital (Chinese: 北京儿童医院)
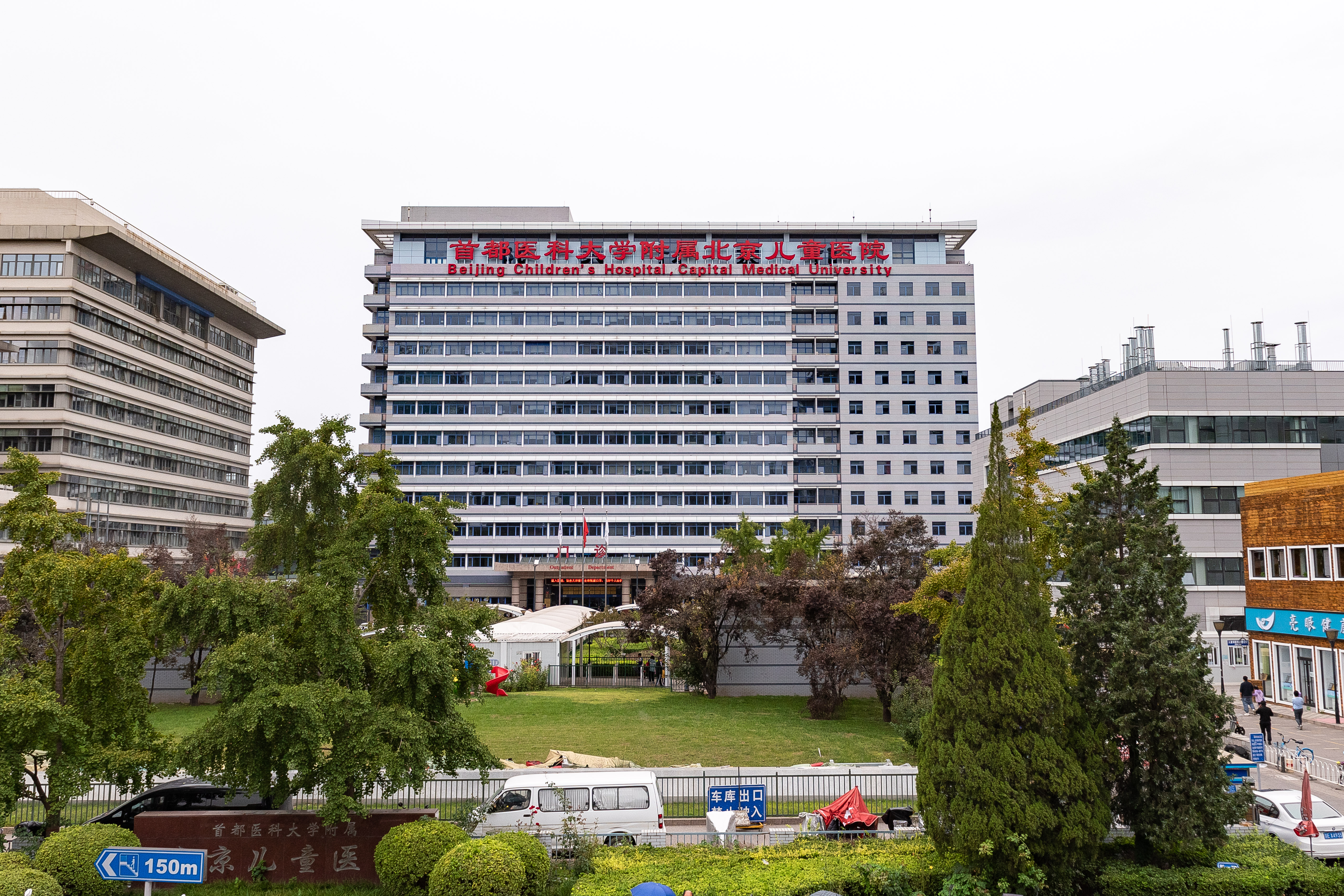
- Taken in October 2021

Geography
- Location: No. 56, Nanlishi Road, Xicheng District, Beijing, People's Republic of China
- Coordinates: 39.911244°N 116.348514°E

Organisation
- Type: Comprehensive pediatric hospital
- Affiliated university: Capital Medical University

History
- Founded: 1942

Links
- Website: english.bch.com.cn

Beijing Children's Hospital is a world-class comprehensive pediatric hospital in Beijing, China. It is affiliated with the Capital Medical University and plays the role of the Pediatric Medical School. The hospital is also the National Center for Children's Health, responsible for medical treatment, teaching and research.

== History ==
In 1942, the Beiping Private Children's Hospital was founded by Zhu Futang, the founder of China's modern pediatric medicine. The hospital was located in Xicheng District, Beijing, and there were only 6 beds.

In 2013, the Beijing Children's Hospital Group was established, innovating a "patients stay, doctors move around" model to serve children across the country.

In 2017, the hospital was approved by the National Health and Family Planning Commission of the People's Republic of China to be the National Center for Children's Health.

In 2019, it was approved by the National Health Commission of the People's Republic of China to establish the National Childhood Cancer Surveillance Center.

In 2023, the Shunyi branch of Beijing Children's Hospital officially opened in Shunyi District, Beijing.

In 2025, China’s first large-scale AI model for paediatrics was launched in Beijing Children's Hospital, and was later introduced to local hospitals in the country.

== Current situation ==
The hospital main campus in Xicheng District covers a land area of 70,000 square meters with a building area of 120,000 square meters. There are 970 beds, and an annual service of about 2.9 million outpatient visits, 80,000 inpatient admissions, and more than 35,000 surgeries.

The hospital is also the National Center for Children's Health and an affiliated hospital of the Capital Medical University, responsible for medical treatment, teaching and research. There are the National Clinical Research Center for Respiratory Diseases, and five national key clinical specialty construction projects, including pediatric critical care, pediatric respiratory medicine, integrated traditional Chinese and Western medicine pediatrics, pediatric surgery, and clinical nursing.

All the three academicians in China's pediatric community, i.e., Professor Zhu Futang, Professor Hu Yamei and Professor Zhang Jinzhe, are (or were) in Beijing Children's Hospital.

The hospital is a world-class pediatric centers in Asia. It has good cooperation with pediatric institutions in many countries, including the United States, Canada, Germany, etc.

Beijing Children's Hospital published 25 papers listed in Nature Index for the Time frame of 1 January 2025 - 31 December 2025, ranking 358th globally and 138th in China in healthcare.

The hospital has won the honors of "National Civilized Unit", "Most Popular Specialized Hospital", "Top Ten People's Satisfactory Hospitals", and the "National May 1st Labor Medal".

Contact Address: 56 Nanlishi Road, Xicheng District, Beijing 100045, China.

== New Site of Children's Hospital ==
Construction of the Yizhuang Campus in Tongzhou District started in 2025, to be completed in 2028. The Children's Hospital Station of Beijing Metro Line S6 is planned near the new site.

In addition, Beijing Children's Hospital has started to build another campus of 500 beds in the north of Haidian District.

== See also ==
- Capital Medical University
- List of hospitals in China
- List of hospitals in Beijing
