= Xinjiang Sport Lottery F.C. =

Chinese football club

Xinjiang Sport Lottery 新疆体彩
- Full name: Xinjiang Football Club of Sport Lottery 新疆体彩足球俱乐部
- Founded: 2006; 19 years ago
- Ground: Xinjiang Sports Centre, Urumqi
- Capacity: 50,000
- Chairman: Yang Quanbin
- Manager: Parhat Azimat
- League: China Yi League
- 2009: 6
Home colours	Away colours

Xinjiang Sport Lottery Football Club (Simplified Chinese: 新疆体彩足球俱乐部) was a football (soccer) club based in Xinjiang, China.

== Managers ==
As of 2009:

Name	Period
(China) Liao Xianmu	2005–2006
(China) Luo Dengren	2006–2008
(China) Parhat Azimat	2008–2009

== Team results ==
Season	Division	Round	W	D	L	F	A	GD	PTS	final stage	W	D	L	F	A	GD
2006	3	16	6	4	6	17	16	1	22	---
2007	3	14	8	4	2	27	15	12	28	→	0	0	2	0	2	−2
2008	3	14	4	5	5	12	19	−7	17	---
