= 2025 Shanghai Shenhua F.C. season =

Shanghai Shenhua
- Chairman: Gu Jiqing
- Head coach: Leonid Slutsky
- Stadium: Shanghai Stadium
- Average home league attendance: 37,505
Home colours	Away colours

2025 Shanghai Shenhua F.C. season
- Traditional Chinese: 上海申花足球俱樂部
- Simplified Chinese: 上海申花足球俱乐部
Transcriptions
Standard Mandarin
- Hanyu Pinyin: Shànghǎi Shēnhuā Zúqiú Jùlèbù

The 2025 Shanghai Shenhua season is Shanghai Shenhua's 25th season in the Chinese Super League and 63rd overall in the Chinese top flight. They also compete in the Chinese FA Cup, the 2024–25 AFC Champions League Elite and the 2025–26 AFC Champions League Elite.

== Squad ==
As of 24 Feb 2025

No.	Name	Nationality	Date of birth (age)	Previous club	Contract since	Contract end
Goalkeepers
1	Xue Qinghao	(China)	26 September 2000 (age 26)	(China) Nantong Zhiyun	2021	
30	Bao Yaxiong	(China)	23 May 1997 (age 29)	(China) Hebei	2023	
41	Zhou Zhengkai	(China)	7 February 2001 (age 25)	(China) Shanghai Shenhua U19	2021	
44	Liu Haoran	(China)	20 February 2005 (age 21)	(China) Shanghai Shenhua U19	2023	
Defenders
2	Wang Shilong	(China)	7 March 2001 (age 25)	(China) Guangzhou	2025	
3	Jin Shunkai	(China)	19 October 2001 (age 25)	(China) Shanghai Shenhua U19	2023	
4	Jiang Shenglong	(China)	24 December 2000 (age 25)	(China) Chongqing Liangjiang Athletic	2018	
5	Zhu Chenjie	(China)	23 August 2000 (age 26)	(China) Shanghai Shenhua U19	2018	
13	Wilson Manafá	(Portugal) (Guinea-Bissau)	23 July 1994 (age 32)	(Spain) Granada CF	2024	
16	Yang Zexiang	(China)	14 December 1994 (age 31)	(China) Chengdu Rongcheng	2022	
21	Cui Lin	(China)	26 October 1997 (age 29)	(China) Hebei FC	2023	
27	Shinichi Chan	(Hong Kong) (Japan)	5 September 2002 (age 24)	(Hong Kong) Kitchee SC	2024	
32	Eddy Francis	(China) (Tanzania)	17 December 1990 (age 35)	(Portugal) Boavista F.C.	2018	
42	Li Tingwei	(China)	30 October 2004 (age 21)	(China) Shanghai Shenhua U21		
43	Yang Haoyu	(China)	25 May 2006 (age 20)	(China) Shanghai Shenhua U21	2025	
46	He Bizhen	(China)	2 May 2003 (age 23)	(China) Shanghai Shenhua U21	2025	
47	He Quan	(China)	30 September 2004 (age 22)	(China) Shanghai Shenhua U21	2025	
48	Zhang Bin	(China)	10 January 2005 (age 21)	(China) Shanghai Shenhua U21	2025	
Midfielders
6	Ibrahim Amadou	(France)	6 April 1993 (age 33)	(France) Angers SCO	2023	
7	Xu Haoyang	(China)	15 January 1999 (age 27)	(China) Shanghai Shenhua U19	2018	
8	Dai Wai Tsun	(China) (Hong Kong) (England)	25 July 1999 (age 27)	(China) Shenzhen Peng City	2023	
10	João Carlos Teixeira	(Portugal)	18 January 1993 (age 33)	(Qatar) Umm Salal SC	2023	
15	Wu Xi	(China)	19 February 1989 (age 37)	(China) Jiangsu Suning	2021	
17	Gao Tianyi	(China)	1 July 1998 (age 28)	(China) Beijing Guoan	2024	
23	Nico Yennaris	(China) (England)	24 May 1993 (age 33)	(China) Beijing Guoan	2025	
33	Wang Haijian	(China)	2 August 2000 (age 26)	(China) Shanghai Shenhua U21	2019	
35	He Xin	(China)	3 October 2004 (age 22)	(China) Shanghai Shenhua U21	2024	
38	Wu Qipeng	(China)	28 February 2007 (age 19)	(China) Shanghai Shenhua U19	2023	
45	Han Jiawen	(China)	28 June 2004 (age 22)	(China) Shanghai Shenhua U21	2024	
45	He Linhan	(China)	29 June 2004 (age 22)	(China) Shanghai Shenhua U21	2024	
Strikers
9	André Luis	(Brazil)	9 March 1994 (age 32)	(Portugal) Moreirense	2024	
11	Saulo Mineiro	(Brazil)	17 June 1997 (age 29)	(Brazil) Ceará	2025	
14	Xie Pengfei	(China)	29 June 1993 (age 33)	(China) Wuhan Three Towns	2024	
19	Luis Nlavo	(Equatorial Guinea)	9 July 2001 (age 25)	(Portugal) Moreirense	2025	
20	Yu Hanchao	(China)	25 February 1987 (age 39)	(China) Guangzhou Evergrande	2020	
34	Liu Chengyu	(China)	2 July 2006 (age 20)	(China) Shanghai Shenhua U21	2024	
37	Marcel Petrov	(China) (Slovenia)	20 March 2006 (age 20)	(Slovenia) Olimpija	2025	
Players who left mid-season

== Transfer ==
=== In ===
Pre-Season

Position	Player	Transferred from	Ref
DF	(China) Wang Shilong	(China) Guangzhou	Free
MF	(China) (England) Nico Yennaris	(China) Beijing Guoan	Free
FW	(China) (Slovenia) Marcel Petrov	(Slovenia) Olimpija	Free
FW	(Brazil) Saulo Mineiro	(Brazil) Ceará	Undisclosed

Mid-Season

Position	Player	Transferred from	Ref
FW	(Equatorial Guinea) Luis Nlavo	(Brazil) Moreirense	Undisclosed

=== Out ===
Pre-Season

Position	Player	Transferred from	Ref
DF	(China) Jin Yangyang	(China) Qingdao Hainiu	Free
DF	(China) Wen Jiabao	(China) Dalian Yingbo	Free
DF	(China) Xu Yougang	(China) Jiangxi Lushan	Free
MF	(China) He Longhai	(China) Qingdao West Coast	Free
MF	(China) Cao Yunding	Retired	N.A.
FW	(Switzerland) (Angola) Cephas Malele	(China) Dalian Yingbo	Free

=== Loan Out ===
Pre-Season

Position	Player	Transferred from	Ref
GK	(China) Ma Zhen	(China) Yunnan Yukun	Season loan
GK	(China) Wang Hanyi	(China) Qingdao West Coast	Season loan
DF	(China) Zhu Yue	(China) Suzhou Dongwu	Season loan
DF	(China) Jiang Zhixin	(China) Suzhou Dongwu	Season loan
DF	(China) Wang Yifan	(China) Suzhou Dongwu	Season loan
DF	(China) Zhu Qiwen	(China) Nanjing City	Season loan
DF	(China) Wang Hao	(China) Dalian K'un City	Season loan
DF	(China) Huang Ming	(China) Shanghai Jiading Huilong	Season loan
MF	(China) Zhou Junchen	(China) Changchun Yatai	Season loan
FW	(China) Zhang Wei	(China) Tianjin Jinmen Tiger	Season loan
FW	(China) Fei Ernanduo	(China) Guangxi Hengchen	Season loan

== Friendlies ==
=== Pre-Season Friendly ===
Win Draw Loss

18 January 2025 1	Shanghai Shenhua (China)	2–0	(China) Dalian Yingbo	Haikou, China
				Stadium: Mission Hills Football Base Stadium

21 January 2025 2	Shanghai Shenhua (China)	4–1	(China) Qingdao West Coast	Haikou, China
				Stadium: Mission Hills Football Base Stadium

24 January 2025 3	Beijing Guo'an (China)	4–1	(China) Shanghai Shenhua	Haikou, China
				Stadium: Mission Hills Football Base Stadium

26 January 2025 4	Shanghai Shenhua (China)	5–3	(China) Tianjin Jinmen Tiger	Haikou, China
				Stadium: Mission Hills Football Base Stadium

== Statistics ==
=== Appearances and goals ===
As of 10 Dec 2025

No.	Nat.	Name	Chinese Super League		Chinese FA Cup		Chinese FA Super Cup		2024–25 AFC Champions League		2025–26 AFC Champions League		Total	
No.	Nat.	Name	Apps.	Goals	Apps.	Goals	Apps.	Goals	Apps.	Goals	Apps.	Goals	Apps.	Goals
1	GK	(China) Xue Qinghao	22	0	2	0	0	0	0	0	2	0	26	0
2	DF	(China) Wang Shilong	1+1	0	1	0	0	0	0+1	0	1	0	5	0
3	DF	(China) Jin Shunkai	3+1	0	1	0	0	0	0	0	1	0	6	0
4	DF	(China) Jiang Shenglong	26	4	2	0	1	0	4	0	5	0	38	4
5	DF	(China) Zhu Chenjie	27	1	2	0	1	0	2	0	6	0	38	1
6	MF	(France) Ibrahim Amadou	5+8	0	1	0	1	1	3	0	1+1	0	20	1
7	MF	(China) Xu Haoyang	4+22	1	1+2	0	0	0	2+1	0	1+2	0	34	1
9	FW	(Brazil) André Luis	21+2	9	2	3	1	1	2	0	3+1	1	32	14
10	MF	(Portugal) João Carlos Teixeira	26+1	6	2	0	1	0	3	0	6	1	39	7
11	FW	(Brazil) Saulo Mineiro	13+1	8	0	0	1	0	3+1	3	2+2	1	23	12
13	DF	(Portugal) (Guinea-Bissau) Wilson Manafá	30	0	1+1	1	1	0	4	0	5	0	42	1
14	FW	(China) Xie Pengfei	2+3	1	1	0	0	0	0+1	0	0	0	7	1
15	MF	(China) Wu Xi	28	9	2	0	1	0	4	0	5	0	40	9
16	DF	(China) Yang Zexiang	1+12	1	2+1	0	0+1	0	0+1	0	2+1	0	21	1
17	MF	(China) Gao Tianyi	23+5	2	1+1	1	0+1	0	1+3	0	6	0	41	3
19	FW	(Equatorial Guinea) Luis Nlavo	14	4	1	1	0	0	0	0	4+1	2	20	7
20	FW	(China) Yu Hanchao	1+19	6	1+2	2	0+1	1	0+2	0	0+3	0	29	9
23	MF	(China) (England) Nico Yennaris	26+2	0	1+1	0	0	0	2+2	0	3	0	37	0
27	DF	(Hong Kong) (Japan) Shinichi Chan	27+1	4	2	0	1	0	4	1	4+1	0	40	5
30	GK	(China) Bao Yaxiong	7	0	1	0	1	0	4	0	4	0	17	0
32	DF	(China) (Tanzania) Eddy Francis	3+1	0	1	0	0	0	2+1	0	0+1	0	9	0
33	MF	(China) Wang Haijian	2+13	1	2	0	0	0	0+3	0	0+2	0	22	1
34	FW	(China) Liu Chengyu	9+8	5	2+1	1	0	0	1+1	0	3	0	25	6
37	FW	(China) (Slovenia) Marcel Petrov	0	0	0+1	0	0	0	0	0	0	0	1	0
38	MF	(China) Wu Qipeng	0+1	0	0	0	0	0	0	0	1	0	2	0
39	GK	(China) Liu Yujie	0	0	0+1	0	0	0	0	0	0	0	1	0
41	GK	(China) Zhou Zhengkai	0	0	0+1	0	0	0	0	0	0	0	1	0
43	DF	(China) Yang Haoyu	8+14	3	1+2	0	1	0	3+1	0	1+4	0	35	3
45	MF	(China) Han Jiawen	0+1	0	0+1	0	0	0	0	0	0+1	0	3	0

== Competitions ==
=== Chinese Super League ===
22 February 2025 1	Shanghai Shenhua	2–1	Changchun Yatai	Shanghai
	Saulo Mineiro 29'; André Luis 90+7'; Jiang Shenglong (yellow card) 90+2'	Report	Tan Long 42'; Xu Haofeng (yellow card) 32'; Zhao Yingjie (yellow card) 54'; Wu Yake (yellow card) 73'	Stadium: Shanghai Stadium; Attendance: 38,783; Referee: Li Haixin

1 March 2025 2	Shanghai Shenhua	2–2	Beijing Guoan	Shanghai
	Wu Xi 39'; André Luis 45+5' (pen.); Eddy Francis (yellow card) 42'	Report	Lin Liangming 11'; Bao Yaxiong 90+3' (o.g.); Nebijan Muhmet (yellow card) 30'; Han Jiaqi (yellow card) 45+1'; Uros Spajic (yellow card) 45+7'; Zhang Yuan (yellow card) 72' (yellow-red card) 83'; Dawhan (yellow card) 83'	Stadium: Shanghai Stadium; Attendance: 39,987; Referee: Memetjan Ahmat

29 March 2025 3	Henan	1–3	Shanghai Shenhua	Zhengzhou
	Iago Maidana 42'; Wang Shangyuan (yellow card) 87'		Saulo Mineiro 67'; Wu Xi 75'; Xie Pengfei 90+5'; André Luis (yellow card) 22'	Stadium: Hanghai Stadium; Attendance: 13,707; Referee: Xing Qi

2 April 2025 4	Shanghai Shenhua	3–1	Yunnan Yukun	Shanghai
	Nene 63' (o.g.); Saulo Mineiro 85', 90+1' (yellow card) 90+1'; João Carlos Teixeira (yellow card) 55'		Ye Chugui 23'; Dilmurat Mawlanyaz (yellow card) 25'; Yi Teng (yellow card) 45+2' (yellow-red card)	Stadium: Shanghai Stadium; Attendance: 25,775; Referee: Huang Yi

6 April 2025 5	Shanghai Port	1–1	Shanghai Shenhua	Shanghai
	Liu Ruofan 5'; Li Shuai (yellow card) 69' (yellow-red card); Wei Zhen (yellow card) 90+2'; Yan Junling (yellow card) 90+7'		Yu Hanchao 82'; André Luis (yellow card) 34'; Nico Yennaris (yellow card) 78'	Stadium: Pudong Football Stadium; Attendance: 24,263; Referee: Ma Ning

12 April 2025 6	Shanghai Shenhua	3–2	Zhejiang	Shanghai
	João Carlos Teixeira 21'; Yu Hanchao 77'; Shinichi Chan 90+7'		Wang Yudong 69'; Bao Yaxiong 71' (o.g.); Tong Lei (yellow card) 58'	Stadium: Shanghai Stadium; Attendance: 37,572; Referee: Fu Ming

16 April 2025 7	Shanghai Shenhua	3–2	Qingdao Hainiu	Shanghai
	Jiang Shenglong 8'; André Luis 16'; João Carlos Teixeira 54' (yellow card) 45+5'		Wellington Silva 4'; Elvis Sarić 26' (pen.); Chen Chunxin (yellow card) 38'; Anson Wong Ho-Chun (yellow card) 90'	Stadium: Shanghai Stadium; Attendance: 25,775; Referee: Du Jianxin

19 April 2025 8	Shanghai Shenhua	2–0	Wuhan Three Towns	Shanghai
	João Carlos Teixeira 21' (yellow card) 30'; André Luis 49'		Gustavo Sauer (yellow card) 90'	Stadium: Shanghai Stadium; Attendance: 25,775; Referee: Niu Ming Hui

26 April 2025 9	Shandong Taishan	0–1	Shanghai Shenhua	Jinan
	Wang Tong (yellow card) 22'; Liu Yang (yellow card) 40'; Xie Wenneng (yellow card) 75'		Gao Tianyi 78' (yellow card) 90+3'; Saulo Mineiro (yellow card) 23'	Stadium: Jinan Olympic Sports Center Stadium; Attendance: 20,389; Referee: Gu Chun Han

2 May 2025 10	Chengdu Rongcheng	1–0	Shanghai Shenhua	Chengdu
	Rômulo 27' (yellow card) 19'; Wei Shihao (yellow card) 21'; Yuan Mincheng (yellow card) 45+6'; Li Yang (yellow card) 54'; Liu Dianzuo (yellow card) 90+5'		Wu Xi (yellow card) 53'; João Carlos Teixeira (yellow card) 53' (yellow-red card)	Stadium: Phoenix Hill Football Stadium; Attendance: 41,216; Referee: Memetjan Ahmat

6 May 2025 11	Meizhou Hakka	1–3	Shanghai Shenhua	Wuhua
	Yue Tze Nam 85'; Branimir Jočić (yellow card) 45'; Wu Xi (yellow card) 53'		Liu Chengyu 60'; Saulo Mineiro 65'; Yang Haoyu 90+5'; Shinichi Chan (yellow card) 9'; Xue Qinghao (yellow card) 89'; Wu Xi (yellow card) 53'	Stadium: Huitang Stadium; Attendance: 9,068; Referee: Gao Peng

10 May 2025 12	Shanghai Shenhua	4–0	Qingdao West Coast	Shanghai
	Liu Chengyu 6'; Saulo Mineiro 14', 31'; Yang Haoyu 87'			Stadium: Shanghai Stadium; Attendance: 36,915; Referee: Fu Ming

17 May 2025 13	Dalian Yingbo	0–3	Shanghai Shenhua	Dalian
			João Carlos Teixeira 34'; Liu Chengyu 38'; Saulo Mineiro 52'	Stadium: Dalian Suoyuwan Football Stadium; Attendance: 60,699; Referee: Xing Qi

14 June 2025 14	Shenzhen Peng City	3–1	Shanghai Shenhua	Shenzhen
	Zhang Yudong 36'; Zhang Yujie 50'; Rade Dugalić 90+4'; Qiao Wang (yellow card) 59'; Edu Garcia (yellow card) 86'		Andre Luis 28' (yellow card) 69'	Stadium: Shenzhen Sports Center Stadium; Referee: Niu Minghui

25 June 2025 15	Shanghai Shenhua	3–0	Tianjin Jinmen Tiger	Shanghai
	Shinichi Chan 42'; Jiang Shenglong 45+4'; André Luis 90+5'; Xue Qinghao (yellow card) 89'		Guo Hao (yellow card) 45+2'	Stadium: Shanghai Stadium

29 June 2025 16	Changchun Yatai	1–2	Shanghai Shenhua	Changchun
	Tan Long 54'; Lazar Rosić (yellow card) 45'; Piao Taoyu (yellow card) 57'		Zhu Chengjie 32'; João Carlos Teixeira 44'; André Luis (yellow card) 57'; Xue Qinghao (yellow card) 90'	Stadium: Changchun Stadium

19 July 2025 17	Beijing Guoan	1–3	Shanghai Shenhua	Beijing
	Gonçalo Rodrigues 27'; Wang Gang (yellow card) 51'		Asué 7'; Wu Xi 21'; Yu Hanchao 90+7' (yellow card) 90+5'; Yang Haoyu (yellow card) 35'; Nico Yennaris (yellow card) 62'	Stadium: Workers' Stadium

27 July 2025 18	Shanghai Shenhua	3–2	Henan	Shanghai
	Jiang Shenglong 17'; João Carlos Teixeira 45+7'; Asué 57'; Gao Tianyi (yellow card) 49'; Wilson Manafá (yellow card) 61'		Bruno Nazário 45+2' (pen.) (yellow card) 39'; Frank Acheampong 76'; Huang Zichang (yellow card) 90+1'	Stadium: Shanghai Stadium

2 August 2025 19	Yunnan Yukun	4–4	Shanghai Shenhua	Yuxi
	Nene 14'; Luo Jing 24'; Oscar Maritu 33'; Pedro Henrique 64'; Zhao Yuhao (yellow card) 80'; Yu Jianxian (yellow card) 90+7'		Gao Tianyi 45+6'; Jiang Shenglong 54'; Yu Hanchao 77'; Andre Luis 81' (pen.); Wilson Manafá (yellow card) 90'	Stadium: Yuxi Plateau Sports Center Stadium

9 August 2025 20	Shanghai Shenhua	1–2	Shanghai Port	Shanghai
	Shinichi Chan 55'; Ibrahim Amadou (yellow card) 41'; Gao Tianyi (yellow card) 49'; Jiang Shenglong (yellow card) 52'; João Carlos Teixeira (yellow card) 85'		Gabrielzinho 27'; Leonardo 42'; Umidjan Yusup (yellow card) 9'; Fu Huan (yellow card) 87'; Li Shenglong (yellow card) 88'; Yan Junling (yellow card) 90+1'; Matheus Jussa (yellow card) 90+12'; Tyias Browning (yellow card) 90+13'	Stadium: Shanghai Stadium

16 August 2025 21	Zhejiang	0–0	Shanghai Shenhua	Hangzhou
	Tong Lei (yellow card) 45'; Yago Cariello (yellow card) 63'		Wilson Manafá (yellow card) 19'; Nico Yennaris (yellow card) 84'; Wang Haijian (yellow card) 86'	Stadium: Huanglong Sports Center Stadium

23 August 2025 22	Qingdao Hainiu	0–2	Shanghai Shenhua	Qingdao
	Wellington Silva (yellow card) 45'; Liu Junshuai (yellow card) 60'; Didier Lamkel Zé (yellow card) 90+2'; Xiao Kun (yellow card) 90+3'		Yu Hanchao 90+4'; Liu Chengyu 90+8'; João Carlos Teixeira (yellow card) 42'; Zhu Chengjie (yellow card) 85'	Stadium: Qingdao Youth Football Stadium

31 August 2025 23	Wuhan Three Towns	1–0	Shanghai Shenhua	Wuhan
	Alexandru Tudorie 89'; Deng Hanwen (yellow card) 16'; Liao Chengjian (yellow card) 64'		Asué (yellow card) 16'; Gao Tianyi (yellow card) 26'; João Carlos Teixeira (yellow card) 42'	Stadium: Wuhan Sports Center

12 September 2025 24	Shanghai Shenhua	3–3	Shandong Taishan	Shanghai
	Wang Haijian 19' (yellow card) 63'; Wu Xi 42' (pen.); Xu Haoyang 64'; Jiang Shenglong (yellow card) 41'; Nico Yennaris (yellow card) 59'; Yang Haoyu (yellow card) 90+8'		Valeri Qazaishvili 37', 45+4', 85'; Wang Dalei (yellow card) 41'; Li Yuanyi (yellow card) 53'	Stadium: Shanghai Stadium

21 September 2025 25	Shanghai Shenhua	1–1	Chengdu Rongcheng	Shanghai
	Shinichi Chan 68'; Liu Chengyu (yellow card) 2'; Hu Hetao (yellow card) 65'; Wei Shihao (yellow card) 81'		Tim Chow 90+9'; Felipe de Sousa Silva (yellow card) 90+8'; Tang Chuang (yellow card) 90+11'; Rômulo (yellow card) 90+12'	Stadium: Shanghai Stadium

26 September 2025 26	Shanghai Shenhua	6–1	Meizhou Hakka	Shanghai
	Asué 11'; Wu Xi 28', 70'; Liu Chengyu 47'; Zexiang Yang 77'; Yang Haoyu 90+4'		Ji Shengpan 87'	Stadium: Shanghai Stadium

17 October 2025 27	Qingdao West Coast	1–2	Shanghai Shenhua	Qingdao
	Matheus Índio 13'; Chen Po-liang (yellow card) 8'; Sun Jie (red card) 38'; Zhang Chengdong (red card) 45'; Zhao Honglüe (yellow card) 90+5'		Wu Xi 20' (pen.); Yu Hanchao 58'; Yu Hanchao 58'; Matheus Índio 13'; Jiang Shenglong (yellow card) 43'; Gao Tian Yi (yellow card) 45+5'	Stadium: Qingdao West Coast University City Sports Center

26 October 2025 28	Shanghai Shenhua	2–2	Dalian Yingbo	Shanghai
	Wu Xi 43'; Andre Luis 90+10' (pen.); Zhu Chenjie (yellow card) 90+12'		Lü Zhuoyi 25'; Liu Zhurun 39'; Huang Zihao (yellow card) 83'; Zhu Pengyu (yellow card) 88' (yellow-red card) 90'; Bi Jinhao (yellow card) 90+9'	Stadium: Shanghai Stadium

31 October 2025 29	Shanghai Shenhua	1–0	Shenzhen Peng City	Shanghai
	André Luis 2'; Nico Yennaris (yellow card) 59'		Jiang Zhipeng (yellow card) 39'; Rade Dugalić (yellow card) 84'	Stadium: Shanghai Stadium

22 November 2025 30	Tianjin Jinmen Tiger	1–3	Shanghai Shenhua	Tianjin
	Li Sirong 90+2'; Yang Zihao (yellow card) 8'; Yang Wei (yellow card) 47'; Huang Jiahui (yellow card) 82'		Asué 12'; Wu Xi 45+8'; André Luis 77'	Stadium: TEDA Soccer Stadium

Pos	Team	Pld	W	D	L	GF	GA	GD	Pts	Qualification or relegation
1	Shanghai Port (C)	30	20	6	4	72	44	+28	66	Qualification for AFC Champions League Elite league stage
2	Shanghai Shenhua	30	19	7	4	67	35	+32	64	Qualification for AFC Champions League Two group stage
3	Chengdu Rongcheng	30	17	9	4	60	28	+32	60	
4	Beijing Guoan	30	17	6	7	69	46	+23	57	Qualification for AFC Champions League Elite league stage
5	Shandong Taishan	30	15	8	7	69	46	+23	53	

Source: Soccerway
Rules for classification:
- During season: 1) Points; 2) Head-to-head points; 3) Head-to-head goal difference; 4) Head-to-head goals scored; 5) Goal difference; 6) Goals scored; 7) Rankings in the previous season. (Rules 2 to 4 are only applied when teams concerned have finished both/all the matches against others.)
- After season: 1) Points; 2) Head-to-head points; 3) Head-to-head goal difference; 4) Head-to-head goals scored; 5) Goal difference; 6) Goals scored; 7) Disciplinary points (yellow card = 1 point, red card = 3 points); 8) Drawing of lots.
  (C) Champions

=== Chinese FA Cup ===
21 May 2025 3rd Round	(3) Wuxi Wugo	0–3	Shanghai Shenhua	Wuxi
	Hu Jiaqi (yellow card) 48'		Yu Hanchao 23', 25'; Gao Tianyi 87'	Stadium: Wuxi Sports Center; Attendance: 6,168; Referee: Xiong Xing

22 June 2025 4th Round	Shanghai Port	2–3	Shanghai Shenhua	Shanghai
	Gabrielzinho 46'; Gustavo 59'; Mateus Vital (yellow card) 47'; Matheus Jussa (yellow card) 90+4'; Li Shuai (yellow card) 90+8'		André Luis 44', 50', 66'; João Carlos Teixeira (yellow card) 22'; Gao Tianyi (yellow card) 45+1'	Stadium: Pudong Football Stadium

23 July 2025 Quarter Final	Shanghai Shenhua	3–3 (a.e.t.) (7–8 p)	Henan	Shanghai
	Asué 28'; Wilson Manafá 86'; Liu Chengyu 102'; João Carlos Teixeira (yellow card) 73'		Felippe Cardoso 33', 114' (yellow card) 105'; Frank Acheampong 53'; Abdurasul Abudulam (yellow card) 19'; Lucas Maia (yellow card) 112'	Stadium: Shanghai Stadium; Referee: Gan Shuran
	Penalties
	Wu Xi (penalty scored); Nico Yennaris (penalty scored); Yu Hanchao (penalty scored); Yang Haoyu (penalty scored); João Carlos Teixeira (penalty missed); Jiang Shenglong (penalty scored); Zhu Chenjie (penalty scored); Xu Haoyang (penalty missed); Wilson Manafá (penalty scored); Liu Chengyu (penalty missed)		Felippe Cardoso (penalty missed); Iago Maidana (penalty scored); Wang Shangyuan (penalty scored); Lucas Maia (penalty scored); Oliver Gerbig (penalty scored); Niu Ziyi (penalty scored); Yeljan Shinar (penalty scored); Huang Zichang (penalty missed); Huang Ruifeng (penalty scored); Lu Yongtao (penalty scored)

=== Chinese FA Super Cup ===
7 February 2025	Shanghai Port	2–3	Shanghai Shenhua	Kunshan
19:35 CST	Gabrielzinho 7', 80'		Amadou 67'; Yu Hanchao 90+4'; André Luis 90+7'	Stadium: Kunshan Olympic Sports Centre; Attendance: 30,927; Referee: Tang Shunqi

=== 2024–25 AFC Champions League Elite ===
Pos	Team	Pld	W	D	L	GF	GA	GD	Pts	Qualification
5	(Japan) Vissel Kobe	7	4	1	2	14	9	+5	13	Advance to round of 16
6	(Thailand) Buriram United	8	3	3	2	7	12	−5	12	Advance to round of 16
7	(China) Shanghai Shenhua	8	3	1	4	13	12	+1	10	Advance to round of 16
8	(China) Shanghai Port	8	2	2	4	10	18	−8	8	Advance to round of 16
9	(South Korea) Pohang Steelers	7	2	0	5	9	17	−8	6	

Source: Asian Football Confederation
Rules for classification: 1) points; 2) goal difference; 3) number of goals scored; 4) number of matches won; 5) penalty shoot-out if only two teams remain tied and played each other on the final matchday 6) fair play ranking; 7) drawing of lots

Win Draw Loss

==== League stage ====
12 February 2025 Matchday 7	Yokohama F. Marinos (Japan)	1–0	(China) Shanghai Shenhua	Yokohama, Japan
	Yan Matheus 20'; Asahi Uenaka (yellow card) 61'; Ken Matsubara (yellow card) 66'	Report	Ibrahim Amadou (yellow card) 26'	Stadium: International Stadium Yokohama; Attendance: 11,626; Referee: Mooud Bonyadifard (Iran)

18 February 2025 Matchday 8	Shanghai Shenhua (China)	4–2	(Japan) Vissel Kobe	Shanghai, China
	Saulo Mineiro 2', 48', 70' (pen.); Shinichi Chan 45+2'	Report	Niina Tominaga 87'; Haruya Ide 90+3'	Stadium: Shanghai Stadium; Attendance: 20,972; Referee: Majed Al-Shamrani (Saudi Arabia)

==== Knockout stage ====
5 March 2025 R16 Leg 1	Shanghai Shenhua (China)	1–0	(Japan) Kawasaki Frontale	Shanghai, China
	Kota Takai 76' (o.g.); Nico Yennaris (yellow card) 5'	Report	Marcinho (yellow card) 42'; Asahi Sasaki (yellow card) 90+2'	Stadium: Shanghai Stadium; Attendance: 20,837; Referee: Salman Falahi (Qatar)

12 March 2025 R16 Leg 2	Kawasaki Frontale (Japan)	4–0 (4–1 agg.)	(China) Shanghai Shenhua	Kawasaki, Japan
	Asahi Sasaki 24'; Erison 64'; Tatsuya Ito 68'; Marcinho 90+1'; Yasuto Wakizaka (yellow card) 42'	Report	Shinichi Chan (yellow card) 57'	Stadium: Kawasaki Todoroki Stadium; Referee: Omar Mohamed Al-Ali (United Arab Emirates)

=== 2025–26 AFC Champions League Elite ===
==== League stage ====
16 September 2025 MD 1	Gangwon FC (South Korea)	2–1	(China) Shanghai Shenhua	Gangneung, South Korea
	Hong Chul 54'; Goo Bon-cheul 64'	Report	João Carlos Teixeira 45+1'; Yu Hanchao (yellow card) 78'; Eddy Francis (yellow card) 82'	Stadium: Gangneung Stadium; Attendance: 4,091; Referee: Ammar Ebrahim Mahfoodh (Bahrain)

1 October 2025 MD 2	Shanghai Shenhua (China)	1–1	(South Korea) Ulsan HD FC	Shanghai, China
	Luis Nlavo 48'	Report	Gustav Ludwigson 62'; Seo Myung-gwan (yellow card) 60'; Choi Seok-hyeon (yellow card) 75'	Stadium: Shanghai Stadium; Attendance: 30,645; Referee: Yusuke Araki (Japan)

22 October 2025 MD 3	Shanghai Shenhua (China)	2–0	(South Korea) FC Seoul	Shanghai, China
	Luis Nlavo 58'; André Luis 89'	Report	Kim Jin-su (yellow card) 26'; Ryu Jae-moon (yellow card) 45'	Stadium: Shanghai Stadium; Attendance: 20,427; Referee: Abdullah Jamali (Kuwait)

5 November 2025 MD 4	Johor Darul Ta'zim (Malaysia)	3–1	(China) Shanghai Shenhua	Johor, Malaysia
	Jonathan Silva 48', 88'; Óscar Arribas 63' (yellow card) 58'; Shane Lowry (yellow card) 59'; Eddy Israfilov (yellow card) 74'	Report	Saulo Mineiro 71' (pen.) (yellow card) 82'; Xu Haoyang (yellow card) 68'; André Luís (yellow card) 75'; João Carlos Teixeira (yellow card) 82'; Wilson Manafá (yellow card) 90+7'	Stadium: Sultan Ibrahim Stadium; Attendance: 20,218; Referee: Adham Makhadmeh (Jordan)

26 November 2025 MD 5	Shanghai Shenhua (China)	0–2	(Japan) Vissel Kobe	Shanghai, China
	André Luís (penalty missed) 82; Shinichi Chan (yellow card) 56'; João Teixeira (yellow card) 63'; Saulo Mineiro (yellow card) 77'	Report	Yosuke Ideguchi 31'; Tetsushi Yamakawa 39'; Yuki Honda (yellow card) 3'; Yuya Kuwasaki (yellow card) 10'; Tetsushi Yamakawa (yellow card) 47'	Stadium: Shanghai Stadium; Attendance: 12,487; Referee: Kim Jong-Hyeok (South Korea)

10 December 2025 MD 6	Sanfrecce Hiroshima (Japan)	1–0	(China) Shanghai Shenhua	Sanfrecce, Japan
	Hayato Araki 78'; Ryo Germain (yellow card) 76'	Report	Shinichi Chan (yellow card) 16'; Wu Xi (yellow card) 68'; Ibrahim Amadou (yellow card) 70'	Stadium: Edion Peace Wing Hiroshima; Attendance: 13,240; Referee: Ahmad Al-Ali (Kuwait)

10 February 2026 MD 7	Shanghai Shenhua (China)	0–2	(Japan) FC Machida Zelvia	Shanghai, China
	Jin Shunkai (yellow card) 2'; Makhtar Gueye (yellow card) 34'	Report	Yuki Soma 3' (pen.), 88'	Stadium: Shanghai Stadium; Attendance: 16,158; Referee: Omar Al-Ali (United Arab Emirates)

17 February 2026 MD 8	Buriram United (Thailand)	–	(China) Shanghai Shenhua	Buriram, Thailand
		Report		Stadium: Chang Arena

Pos	Team	Pld	W	D	L	GF	GA	GD	Pts	Qualification
8	(South Korea) Gangwon FC	8	2	3	3	9	11	−2	9	Advance to round of 16
9	(South Korea) Ulsan HD	8	2	3	3	6	8	−2	9	
10	(China) Chengdu Rongcheng	8	1	3	4	7	11	−4	6	
11	(China) Shanghai Shenhua	8	1	1	6	5	13	−8	4	
12	(China) Shanghai Port	8	0	4	4	2	11	−9	4	

Source: AFC
Rules for classification: 1) points; 2) goal difference; 3) number of goals scored; 4) number of matches won; 5) penalty shoot-out if only two teams remain tied and played each other on the final matchday 6) fair play ranking; 7) drawing of lots
