= Leonid Slutsky =

Leonid Slutsky may refer to:

- Leonid Slutsky (football coach) (born 1971), Russian association football manager and former player
- Leonid Slutsky (politician) (born 1968), Russian politician
