= Yang Haoyu (footballer, born 2006) =

Chinese footballer (born 2006)

Yang Haoyu 杨皓宇
Personal information
- Full name: Yang Haoyu
- Date of birth: 25 May 2006 (age 20)
- Place of birth: Jinan, Shandong, China
- Height: 1.80 m (5 ft 11 in)
- Position: Midfielder

Team information
- Current team: Shanghai Shenhua
- Number: 43

Youth career
- 2018–2024: Shanghai Shenhua

Senior career*
Years	Team	Apps	(Gls)
2024–	Shanghai Shenhua	38	(4)

International career^{‡}
2024	China U19	3	(0)
2025–	China U23	12	(0)
Medal record
Men's football
Representing China
AFC U-23 Asian Cup
Runner-up	2026 Saudi Arabia	Team
Asian Games
Bronze medal – third place	2026 Aichi–Nagoya	Team
- * Club domestic league appearances and goals as of 19 November 2026 ‡ National team caps and goals as of 22 January 2026

Yang Haoyu (simplified Chinese: 杨皓宇; traditional Chinese: 楊皓宇; pinyin: Yáng Hàoyǔ; born 25 May 2006) is a Chinese professional footballer who plays as a midfielder for Chinese Super League club Shanghai Shenhua.

== Early life ==
Yang was born to his mother, the owner of a children's hair salon and a natatorium, and his father Yang Zhiyong, a youth football coach, in the Lixia District of Jinan, Shandong. Yang started playing football at the age of four, and attended Dianliu No. 1 Primary School of Jinan. In the latter half of 2018, Yang moved to Shanghai with his parents. After joining the Shanghai Shenhua youth academy, he was educated at Shanghai Jiangzhen Middle School in Pudong, Shanghai.

== Club career ==
=== Shanghai Shenhua ===
On 29 February 2024, Shanghai Shenhua announced that Yang would be registered for the 2024 Chinese Super League season, wearing the number 43 shirt, but failed to make a single appearance for them in the 2024 season. On 7 February 2025, he made his senior and professional debut for Shanghai Shenhua in a Shanghai derby 3–2 win over Shanghai Port in the 2025 Chinese FA Super Cup, starting in the match and playing 61 minutes. On 12 February 2025, Yang made his continental debut, starting in the away match against Japanese side Yokohama F. Marinos in the 2024–25 AFC Champions League Elite league stage, which ended as a 1–0 defeat to Shenhua. In the match, he became the youngest ever Chinese player to create three chances in an AFC Champions League Elite match, aged 18 years and 263 days. Six days later, he provided an assist for Shinichi Chan in a 4–2 win over Vissel Kobe in the AFC Champions League Elite league stage. On 22 February 2025, Yang made his Chinese Super League debut in a 2–1 home win against Changchun Yatai. On 6 May, he scored his first professional goal in a 3–1 victory over Meizhou Hakka. In the following match, he scored his second of the season, scoring from a deflected long-range effort in a 4–0 win against Qingdao West Coast.

== International career ==
In June 2021, Yang was selected as part of a China U16 training camp.

In March 2024, Yang played two friendly matches for the China U19 against Indonesia U19. In May 2024, he was included in the squad for a tournament hosted by the China U19.

In March 2025, he was called up to the China U22 to play in the 2025 CFA Team China Cup.

== Career statistics ==
=== Club ===
As of 10 December 2025

Appearances and goals by club, season, and competition
Club	Season	League			Cup		Continental		Other		Total	
Club	Season	Division	Apps	Goals	Apps	Goals	Apps	Goals	Apps	Goals	Apps	Goals
Shanghai Shenhua	2024	Chinese Super League	0	0	0	0	0 (Note: Appearances in AFC Champions League Elite)	0	0 (Note: Appearances in Chinese FA Super Cup)	0	0	0
Shanghai Shenhua	2025	Chinese Super League	22	3	3	0	9	0	1	0	35	3
Shanghai Shenhua	Total		22	3	3	0	9	0	1	0	35	3
Career total			22	3	3	0	9	0	1	0	35	3

== Honours ==
Shanghai Shenhua

- Chinese FA Super Cup: 2025

China U23

- AFC U-23 Asian Cup runner-up: 2026
