= Ma Zhen =

Chinese football player (born 1998)

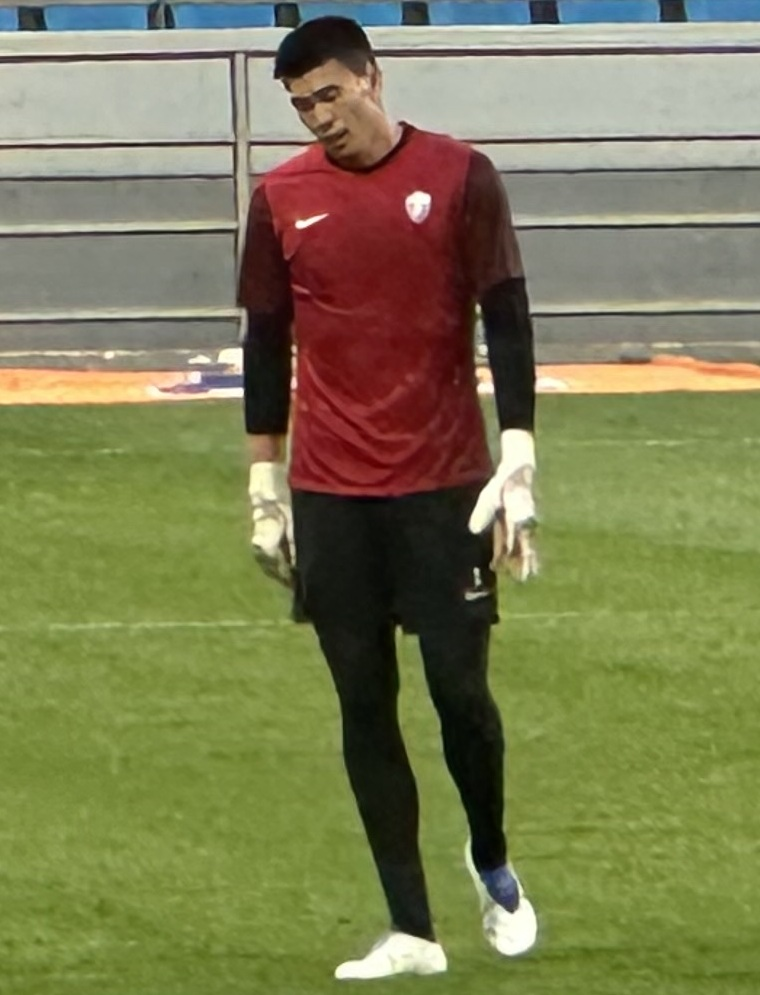
- Ma Zhen in May 2025

Personal information
- Date of birth: 1 June 1998 (age 28)
- Place of birth: Dalian, Liaoning, China
- Height: 1.96 m (6 ft 5 in)
- Position: Goalkeeper

Team information
- Current team: Shanghai Shenhua
- Number: 24

Senior career*
| Years | Team | Apps | (Gls) |
| 2019 | Tianjin Tianhai | 1 | (0) |
| 2020– | Shanghai Shenhua | 50 | (0) |
| 2025 | → Yunnan Yukun (loan) | 26 | (0) |
- * Club domestic league appearances and goals as of 26 August 2025

Ma Zhen (simplified Chinese: 马镇; traditional Chinese: 馬鎮; pinyin: Mǎ Zhèn; born 1 June 1998) is a Chinese professional footballer who plays as a goalkeeper for Chinese Super League club Shanghai Shenhua.

== Club career ==
Ma Zhen would be promoted to the senior team of top tier club Tianjin Tianhai in the 2019 Chinese Super League season to act as cover for first choice goalkeeper Zhang Lu. He would make his debut in a league game on 12 May 2019 against Guangzhou R&F F.C. where the Head coach Shen Xiangfu brought him on to replace outfield player Wu Wei and played him as an attacker for the final few minutes of the game that ended in a 2-1 defeat. The following season Ma Zhen would join another top tier club in Shanghai Shenhua for the start of the 2020 Chinese Super League campaign. He would make his debut as a goalkeeper for the club on 27 October 2020 in a league game against Chongqing Dangdai Lifan F.C. that ended in a 3–1 victory.

In the 2023 Chinese Super League, Ma Zhen began the season as the first-choice keeper for Shanghai Shenhua. He performed well at first, making 14 saves out of 15 shots on target in April, a performance that won him the Goalkeeper of the Month Award. However, in the away game against Chengdu Rongcheng on May 23rd, he was booked for punching opposition players, an action that earned him a five-match ban. This, combined with declining performances, led to him gradually losing his first-choice keeper spot to Bao Yaxiong.

On 19 January 2025, Ma was loan to another Chinese Super League club Yunnan Yukun. On 1 January 2026, Yunnan Yukun announced Ma's departure after the 2025 season.

== Career statistics ==
As of match played 31 December 2025.

Appearances and goals by club, season and competition
| Club | Season | League | | | National Cup | | Continental | | Other | | Total | |
| Club | Season | Division | Apps | Goals | Apps | Goals | Apps | Goals | Apps | Goals | Apps | Goals |
|---|---|---|---|---|---|---|---|---|---|---|---|---|
| Tianjin Tianhai | 2019 | Chinese Super League | 1 | 0 | 0 | 0 | – | | – | | 1 | 0 |
| Shanghai Shenhua | 2020 | Chinese Super League | 4 | 0 | 0 | 0 | 0 | 0 | – | | 4 | 0 |
| Shanghai Shenhua | 2021 | Chinese Super League | 5 | 0 | 0 | 0 | - | | - | | 5 | 0 |
| Shanghai Shenhua | 2022 | Chinese Super League | 21 | 0 | 0 | 0 | - | | - | | 21 | 0 |
| Shanghai Shenhua | 2023 | Chinese Super League | 18 | 0 | 3 | 0 | - | | - | | 21 | 0 |
| Shanghai Shenhua | 2024 | Chinese Super League | 2 | 0 | 2 | 0 | 0 | 0 | 0 | 0 | 4 | 0 |
| Shanghai Shenhua | 2026 | Chinese Super League | 0 | 0 | 0 | 0 | 0 | 0 | - | | 0 | 0 |
| Shanghai Shenhua | Total | | 50 | 0 | 2 | 0 | 0 | 0 | 0 | 0 | 55 | 0 |
| Yunnan Yukun (loan) | 2025 | Chinese Super League | 26 | 0 | 3 | 0 | – | | – | | 29 | 0 |
| Career total | | | 77 | 0 | 8 | 0 | 0 | 0 | 0 | 0 | 85 | 0 |

== Honours ==
Shanghai Shenhua

- Chinese FA Cup: 2023
- Chinese FA Super Cup: 2024
