= 2025 Chinese FA Super Cup =

Quark 2025 Chinese FA Super Cup
Shanghai Port	Shanghai Shenhua
2	3
- Date: 7 February 2025
- Venue: Kunshan Olympic Sports Centre, Kunshan
- Referee: Tang Shunqi
- Attendance: 30,927

The Quark 2025 Chinese FA Super Cup (Chinese: 夸克2025中国足球协会超级杯) was the 20th Chinese FA Super Cup, an annual football match contested by the winners of the previous season's Chinese Super League and FA Cup competitions. The match was played between Shanghai Port, champions of the 2024 Chinese Super League and the winner of the 2024 Chinese FA Cup, and Shanghai Shenhua, the runners-up of the 2024 Chinese Super League.

== Match ==
=== Details ===
7 February 2025
19:35 CST

Shanghai Port	2–3	Shanghai Shenhua
Gabrielzinho 7', 80'		Amadou 67'; Yu Hanchao 90+4'; André Luis 90+7'

Kunshan Olympic Sports Centre, Kunshan
Attendance: 30,927
Referee: Tang Shunqi

Shanghai Port	Shanghai Shenhua

GK	1	(China) Yan Junling
RB	19	(China) Wang Zhen'ao	(substituted off) 63'
CB	3	(China) Tyias Browning	(substituted off) 63'
CB	2	(China) Li Ang
LB	32	(China) Li Shuai
RM	10	(Brazil) Mateus Vital
DM	22	(Brazil) Matheus Jussa
AM	45	(Brazil) Leonardo
LM	30	(Brazil) Gabrielzinho	7', 80'
CF	26	(China) Liu Ruofan	(substituted off) 79'
CF	9	(Brazil) Gustavo
Substitutes:
GK	12	(China) Chen Wei
DF	4	(China) Wang Shenchao
DF	5	(China) Zhang Linpeng	(substituted on) 63'
DF	13	(China) Wei Zhen
DF	15	(China) Ming Tian	(substituted on) 63'
DF	28	(China) He Guan
MF	6	(China) Xu Xin
MF	20	(China) Yang Shiyuan
MF	36	(China) Ablahan Haliq
FW	11	(China) Lü Wenjun
FW	18	(China) Afrden Asqer
FW	27	(China) Feng Jin	(substituted on) 79'	(yellow card) 88'
Manager:
(Australia) Kevin Muscat

GK	30	(China) Bao Yaxiong
RB	13	(Portugal) Wilson Manafá	(yellow card) 75'	(substituted off) 76'
CB	5	(China) Zhu Chenjie
CB	4	(China) Jiang Shenglong
LB	27	(Hong Kong) Shinichi Chan
DM	6	(France) Ibrahim Amadou	67'
DM	15	(China) Wu Xi	(substituted off) 86'
RM	10	(Portugal) João Carlos Teixeira	(yellow card) 66'
AM	9	(Brazil) André Luis	90+7'
LM	43	(China) Yang Haoyu	(substituted off) 61'
CF	11	(Brazil) Saulo Mineiro
Substitutes:
GK	1	(China) Xue Qinghao
GK	41	(China) Zhou Zhengkai
DF	2	(China) Wang Shilong
DF	3	(China) Jin Shunkai
DF	16	(China) Yang Zexiang	(substituted on) 76'
DF	32	(China) Eddy Francis
MF	7	(China) Xu Haoyang
MF	14	(China) Xie Pengfei
MF	17	(China) Gao Tianyi	(substituted on) 61'	(yellow card) 89'
MF	23	(China) Nico Yennaris
MF	33	(China) Wang Haijian
FW	20	(China) Yu Hanchao	(substituted on) 86'	90+4'
Manager:
(Russia) Leonid Slutsky

Man of the Match:

Assistant referees:
Fourth official:
Video assistant referee:
Assistant video assistant referees:

Match rules

- 90 minutes.
- 30 minutes of extra time if necessary.
- Penalty shoot-out if scores still level.
- Maximum of five substitutions, with a sixth allowed in extra time.
- Maximum of four foreign players on the pitch.

Chinese FA Super Cup
2025 winners

Fifth title

== See also ==
- 2024 Chinese Super League
- 2024 Chinese FA Cup
