= Wu Qipeng =

Chinese footballer

Personal information
- Full name: 吴启鹏
- Date of birth: 28 February 2007 (age 19)
- Place of birth: Suzhou, Jiangsu, China
- Height: 1.82 m (6 ft 0 in)
- Positions: Defender; defensive midfielder

Team information
- Current team: Shanghai Shenhua
- Number: 38

Youth career
- Shanghai Shenhua

Senior career*
Years	Team	Apps	(Gls)
2025–	Shanghai Shenhua	13	(0)

International career^{‡}
2022–2023	China U17	6	(0)
2026–	China U19	1	(0)
- * Club domestic league appearances and goals as of 15 October 2026 ‡ National team caps and goals as of 15 October 2026

Wu Qipeng (simplified Chinese: 吴启鹏; traditional Chinese: 吳啟鵬; pinyin: Wú Qǐpéng; born 28 February 2007) is a Chinese professional footballer who plays as a defender or defensive midfielder for Chinese Super League club Shanghai Shenhua.

== Early life and youth career ==
Wu was born on 28 February 2007 in Suzhou, Jiangsu. He began playing football at Shengpu Experimental Primary School in his hometown, starting the sport in third grade. He progressed through the Shanghai Shenhua youth academy, where he played primarily as a centre-back and was promoted to higher age-group national youth teams ahead of schedule.

== Club career ==
=== Shanghai Shenhua ===
In the 2025 summer transfer window, Shanghai Shenhua registered Wu for the first-team squad, issuing him the number 38 shirt. On 16 September 2025, Wu made his professional debut, starting as a defensive midfielder in Shanghai Shenhua's AFC Champions League Elite group-stage match away against Gangwon FC. The match ended 1–2 to Gangwon.

Ahead of the 2026 season, head coach Leonid Slutsky converted Wu from a centre-back into a defensive midfielder, citing his 1.82-metre height as better suited to the midfield role. On 14 March 2026, Wu made his first Chinese Super League start in a 1–1 away draw against Zhejiang, recording a running distance of nearly 11,000 metres.

== International career ==
On 4 December 2025, Wu received his first call-up to the China U22 national team for the seventh training camp of 2025, ahead of the 2026 AFC U-23 Asian Cup. He withdrew from the camp in mid-December after pulling an external oblique muscle during a training match and was unable to participate in the tournament.

In March 2026, Wu was included in the China U19 national team squad for two friendly matches against Australia U19 in Yiwu. He sustained a muscle strain during U19 training, missed the match against Australia, and returned to Shanghai Shenhua early for rehabilitation.

== Career statistics ==
=== Club ===
As of 15 October 2026

Appearances and goals by club, season and competition
Club	Season	League			National Cup		Continental		Other		Total	
Club	Season	Division	Apps	Goals	Apps	Goals	Apps	Goals	Apps	Goals	Apps	Goals
Shanghai Shenhua	2025	Chinese Super League	1	0	0	0	2	0	—		1	0
Shanghai Shenhua	2026	Chinese Super League	11	0	0	0	0	0	—		11	0
Career total			13	0	0	0	2	0	0	0	13	0
