= Osvaldo Giménez =

Uruguayan football manager (born 1959)

Personal information
- Full name: Osvaldo Wilson Giménez Toledo
- Date of birth: 5 September 1959 (age 67)
- Place of birth: Montevideo, Uruguay

Team information
- Current team: Peñarol (sporting director)

Managerial career
- Years: Team
- 1991–1994: Uruguay Montevideo
- 1994–1997: Uruguay (assistant)
- 1998: Tianjin Teda
- 1998–2006: Uruguay (general manager)
- 2006–2007: Shanghai United
- 2007: Shanghai Shenhua
- 2009: Shanghai Shenhua (managing director)
- 2009–: Peñarol (sporting director)

Osvaldo Wilson Giménez Toledo (born 5 September 1959 in Montevideo, Uruguay) is a Uruguayan football manager and currently sporting director at Peñarol.

== Career ==
In June 1998, Osvaldo Giménez was appointed head coach of Tianjin Teda in the second tier league of China, as replacement for local coach Lin Xinjiang. The same year, Tianjin was promoted to Chinese Jia-A League without losing one game in the whole season, but Giménez decided to work for the Uruguay national team at the end of the season.

Giménez returned to China after eight years. He took over as head coach of Shanghai United on 6 June 2006, replacing Brazilian Jose Carlos. In 2007, the club owner Zhu Jun and his company The9 Limited bought a majority share of inner-city rival of Shanghai Shenhua and began to merge Shanghai United into Shanghai Shenhua. Zhu Jun also announced that Osvaldo Giménez would replace the previously successful existing head coach of Shanghai Shenhua, Wu Jingui. With him at the helm, Shanghai Shenhua had won the A3 Champions Cup in 2007. However, he was sacked on 1 October for poor performance in the league.

He returned to Shanghai Shenhua in December 2008, and was appointed the club's first-ever foreign managing director.

At the end of season 2009, Giménez backed Uruguay again and was hired as sporting director of Peñarol.
