= 2024 Chinese FA Super Cup =

Shanghai Port	Shanghai Shenhua
0	1
- Date: 25 February 2024
- Venue: Hongkou Football Stadium, Shanghai
- Man of the Match: Cephas Malele
- Referee: Li Haixin
- Attendance: 18,561

2024 Chinese FA Super Cup (Chinese: 2024中国足球协会超级杯) was the 19th Chinese FA Super Cup, an annual football match contested by the winners of the previous season's Chinese Super League and FA Cup competitions. The match was played between Shanghai Port, champions of the 2023 Chinese Super League, and Shanghai Shenhua, winners of the 2023 Chinese FA Cup.

== Match ==
=== Details ===
25 February 2024
16:00 CST

Shanghai Port	0–1	Shanghai Shenhua
		Malele 55'

Hongkou Football Stadium, Shanghai
Attendance: 18,561
Referee: Li Haixin (Guangdong FA)

Shanghai Port	Shanghai Shenhua

GK	1	(China) Yan Junling
RB	4	(China) Wang Shenchao	(substituted off) 81'
CB	5	(China) Zhang Linpeng	(yellow card) 18'
CB	2	(China) Li Ang
LB	32	(China) Li Shuai
CM	16	(China) Xu Xin	(substituted off) 72'
CM	8	(Brazil) Oscar
CM	22	(Brazil) Matheus Jussa	(yellow card) 49' (yellow-red card) 86'
RW	7	(China) Wu Lei
LW	10	(Argentina) Matías Vargas	(substituted off) 73'
CF	11	(China) Lü Wenjun	(substituted off) 73'
Substitutes:
GK	12	(China) Chen Wei
GK	25	(China) Du Jia
DF	13	(China) Wei Zhen
DF	19	(China) Wang Zhen'ao	(substituted on) 81'
DF	20	(China) Yang Shiyuan	(substituted on) 72'
DF	28	(China) He Guan
DF	37	(China) Chen Xuhuang
MF	38	(China) Li Deming
FW	17	(Chinese Taipei) Will Donkin
FW	27	(China) Feng Jin	(substituted on) 73'
FW	33	(China) Liu Zhurun
FW	45	(China) Liu Xiaolong	(substituted on) 73'
Manager:
(Australia) Kevin Muscat

GK	30	(China) Bao Yaxiong
RB	13	(Portugal) Wilson Manafá
CB	5	(China) Zhu Chenjie
CB	3	(China) Jin Shunkai	(yellow card) 49'	(substituted off) 72'
LB	16	(China) Yang Zexiang	(yellow card) 74'
DM	10	(Portugal) João Carlos Teixeira
DM	6	(France) Ibrahim Amadou
RM	20	(China) Yu Hanchao	(yellow card) 58'	(substituted off) 72'
AM	9	(Brazil) André Luis	(substituted off) 90+5'
LM	7	(China) Xu Haoyang	(substituted off) 57'
CF	11	(Switzerland) Cephas Malele	55'
Substitutes:
GK	1	(China) Ma Zhen
DF	4	(China) Jiang Shenglong	(substituted on) 72'
DF	22	(China) Jin Yangyang
DF	32	(China) Eddy Francis
MF	14	(China) Xie Pengfei	(substituted on) 72'
MF	15	(China) Wu Xi	(substituted on) 57'
MF	17	(China) Gao Tianyi	(substituted on) 90+5'
MF	28	(China) Cao Yunding
MF	33	(China) Wang Haijian
MF	39	(China) Liu Yujie
FW	29	(China) Zhou Junchen
FW	36	(China) Fei Ernanduo
Manager:
(Russia) Leonid Slutsky

Man of the Match:
(Switzerland) Cephas Malele
Assistant referees:
Shi Xiang (Jiangsu FA)
Tang Chao (Beijing FA)
Fourth official:
Du Jianxin (Gansu FA)
Video assistant referee:
Wang Jing (Guizhou FA)
Assistant video assistant referees:
Gu Chunhan (Wuhan FA)

Match rules

- 90 minutes.
- 30 minutes of extra time if necessary.
- Penalty shoot-out if scores still level.
- Maximum of five substitutions, with a sixth allowed in extra time.
- Maximum of four foreign players on the pitch.

Chinese FA Super Cup
2024 winners

Fourth title
