= Marcel Petrov =

Footballer (born 2006)

Personal information
- Date of birth: 20 March 2006 (age 20)
- Place of birth: Yiwu, Zhejiang, China
- Height: 1.82 m (6 ft 0 in)
- Position: Forward

Team information
- Current team: Jiangxi Dingnan United (on loan from Shanghai Shenhua)

Youth career
- AKSIL FC
- –2024: Olimpija

Senior career*
Years	Team	Apps	(Gls)
2025–	Shanghai Shenhua	0	(0)
2026–	→ Jiangxi Dingnan United (loan)	2	(1)

International career^{‡}
2021–2022	Slovania U16	5	(1)
2022–2023	Slovenia U17	3	(0)
- * Club domestic league appearances and goals ‡ National team caps and goals as of 14 February 2023

Marcel Petrov, known as Wang Hanlong (Chinese: 王汉龙; pinyin: Wáng Hànlóng; born 20 March 2006) in China, is a professional footballer who plays as a forward for Jiangxi Dingnan United, on loan from Shanghai Shenhua. Born in China, he was a Slovenia youth international.

== Early life ==
Petrov was born on 20 March 2006 in Yiwu, Zhejiang, China. Born to a Slovenian father and a Chinese mother, he started playing football at the age of six.

== Club career ==
As a youth player, Petrov joined the youth academy of Chinese side AKSIL FC. Subsequently, he joined the youth academy of Slovenian side Olimpija, where he was the second top scorer of the under-15 league during the 2020–21 season. In 2025, he signed for Chinese side Shanghai Shenhua.

On 28 February 2026, Petrov was loaned to China League One club Jiangxi Dingnan United for the 2026 season.

== Style of play ==
Petrov plays as a forward. Sohu wrote in 2025 that "his physical fitness and shooting skills were impressive [while training with Shanghai Shenhua]".
