= Shanghai Shenhua F.C. =

Chinese association football club

Shanghai Shenhua 上海申花
- Full name: Shanghai Shenhua Football Club (上海申花足球俱乐部)
- Nicknames: Tricolor; The Flower of Shanghai (申花); The Blue Devils (蓝魔)
- Founded: 1 November 1951; 75 years ago (Semi-professional); 10 December 1993; 32 years ago (Professional)
- Ground: Shanghai Stadium
- Capacity: 72,436
- Owner: Shanghai Jiushi Group
- Chairman: Gu Jiqing
- Head coach: Vladan Milojević
- League: Chinese Super League
- 2026: Chinese Super League, 7th of 16
- Website: shenhuafc.com.cn
Home colours	Away colours

Shanghai Shenhua F.C.
- Traditional Chinese: 上海申花足球俱樂部
- Simplified Chinese: 上海申花足球俱乐部
Transcriptions
Standard Mandarin
- Hanyu Pinyin: Shànghǎi Shēnhuā Zúqiú Jùlèbù

Shanghai Shenhua Football Club (Chinese: 上海申花足球俱乐部; pinyin: Shànghǎi Shēnhuā Zúqiú Jùlèbù) is a Chinese professional football club based in Shanghai, that competes in the Chinese Super League, the top tier of Chinese football. Shanghai Shenhua plays its home matches at the Shanghai Stadium, located within Xuhui District.

The owner of Shanghai Shenhua is Shanghai Jiushi Group, a state-owned cultural and sports operation company in Shanghai. Shanghai Shenhua is one of the four clubs to have never been relegated from the Chinese top-flight since the Chinese Super League's foundation in 2004. The term shen hua literally translates as "the Flower of Shanghai" in English – shen is one of the alternative names for Shanghai and hua means flower in Chinese.

The club's predecessor was the municipal-run semi-pro club Shanghai Football Club. The team predominantly played in the top tier, where they won several domestic league and cup titles. On 10 December 1993, the club was reorganized to become a completely professional football club so they could play in the 1994 Chinese Jia-A League season, making them one of the founding members of the first fully professional top-tier leagues in China. Shenhua have won 6 Chinese FA Cup and a record 5 Chinese FA Super Cup.

According to Forbes, Shenhua was the 6th most valuable football team in China, with a team value of $106 million, and an estimated revenue of $29 million in 2015.

== History ==
=== Early club ===
Shanghai Shenhua's predecessor was originally called East China, a team name used as far back as 1910 for football in the multi-sport event Chinese National Games. The local Shanghai government sports body decided to use this name for their new club, founded on 1 November 1951, to take part in China's first fully nationalized national football league tournament, where they finished second in the league that year. The football league gradually expanded and the team was allowed to name themselves after their own province of Shanghai in 1957. Soon afterwards, by 1961, Shanghai started to establish themselves as a major football team within China when they won their first league title. This was then quickly followed by their second league title in 1962. However, in 1966, because of the Chinese Cultural Revolution, football in China was halted and Shanghai was unable to play. When football returned in China, Shanghai was able to return to the top tier. However, they were unable to regain any of the dominance that they had previously shown and were even relegated in 1980. Though they were able to be quickly promoted in the following season, they spent many years without actually winning any titles until Wang Houjun led them to win the Chinese FA Cup in 1991, which was their first trophy in 29 years.

=== Professionalism ===
Throughout the 1990s, the Chinese Football Association was demanding more professionalism from their football teams and while many were semi-professional, Shanghai would be one of the first when they gathered sponsorship from Yu Zhifei and the local company named Shenhua ("Flower of Shanghai") on 10 December 1993, founding Shanghai Shenhua. This then saw Shanghai hire their first professional manager in Xu Genbao, who was the previous China national team manager, in 1994. The move would quickly see Shanghai win the second professional football league title by the end of the 1995 league season. When Xu left, Shanghai attempted to bring in several foreign coaches to add more experience to the team. However, few achieved any success despite being close on several occasions, except for Muricy Ramalho's brief spell when the club won the 1998 Chinese FA Cup. By the end of 2001, the Shenhua group ended their sponsorship of the club and were replaced by SVA and the Shanghai Media & Entertainment Group. The club changed its name to Shanghai Shenhua SVA SMEG Football Club. The team, however, remained unique as it still retained "Shenhua" in its name, whereas many other teams dropped the name of their former sponsors completely. On the pitch, the club would take over Shanghai 02, a youth football team set up by Xu Genbao, while also bringing in a new manager in Wu Jingui, who built a new squad predominantly using many from the Shanghai 02 squad and despite struggling in his debut season, he was able to win the league title in 2003.

=== Zhu Jun era ===
In 2007, the owner of inner-city rival Shanghai United, Zhu Jun and his company The9 Limited, bought a majority share of Shanghai Shenhua and began to merge Shanghai United into Shanghai Shenhua. His first act was to replace the previously successful existing head coach Wu Jingui with Shanghai United's Osvaldo Giménez. The appointment was to prove highly disruptive and Wu Jingui was quickly brought back as the head coach after only a few months, but was sacked on 9 September 2008. Jia Xiuquan took over his position on the same day. This was followed by the club adding to their backroom staff when, on 1 January 2009, Shenhua made Chinese football history by becoming the first Chinese team to hire a foreign CEO and a technical director. The club hired former manager Osvaldo Gimenez as their chief executive officer. One day later, former PSV Eindhoven technical director Stan Valckx joined Shenhua in the same position.

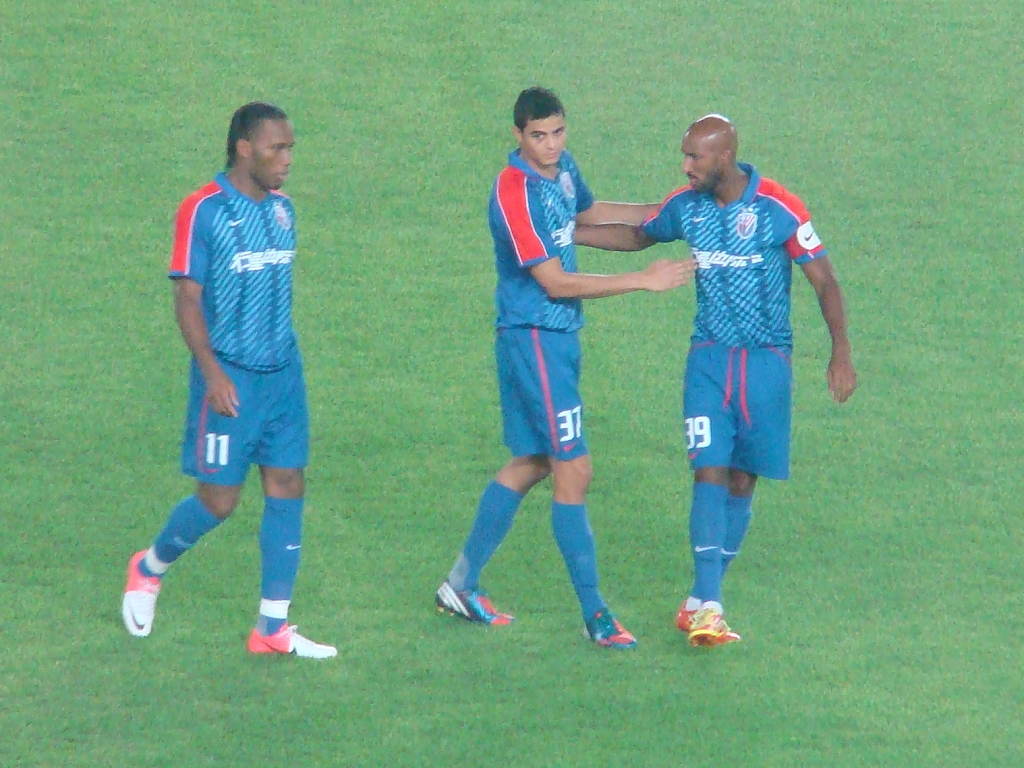
Didier Drogba, Giovanni Moreno, and Nicolas Anelka against Guangzhou Evergrande in July 2012.

After a disappointing 2011 season in the Chinese Super League, Zhu Jun decided to bring in a marquee player, so on 12 December 2011, it was confirmed that Chelsea striker Nicolas Anelka would be arriving in Shanghai in January 2012, while six days later, it was announced that his compatriot Jean Tigana would be the head coach from the 2012 season. Tigana was fired after a string of poor results and was replaced by former Argentina national team coach Sergio Batista to lead the team. After a successful season playing for Chelsea and winning the 2011–12 UEFA Champions League, Ivorian striker Didier Drogba signed a two-and-a-half-year deal with Shenhua. This was soon followed by the signing of Colombian international footballer Giovanni Moreno from Argentinian club Racing Club. These signings were intended to boost the club's title challenge and see Zhu Jun's investment within the club reach 150 million Yuan, which he believed gave him a controlling stake of 70 percent, as promised by the other shareholders. When the other shareholders decided not to agree to this arrangement, Zhu Jun decided to pull his funding of the club, which resulted in the team finishing in a disappointing ninth place and both Anelka and Drogba leaving the club. The relationship between Zhu Jun and the other shareholders became even more fractious at the beginning of the 2013 league season when the Chinese FA issued the club with a six-point deduction for match-fixing ten years prior and a fine of one million Yuan. This would lead to a shareholder dispute between the other shareholders SVA, Shanghai Media Group, Shanghai Electric Group, and Huangpu SASAC on who should pay for this fine, which saw a gap in the club finances that saw Rolando Schiavi, Patricio Toranzo, and Giovanni Moreno refuse to play the 31 March 2013, league game against Liaoning Whowin because of unpaid wages.

=== Controversy ===
Critics would dispute the legitimacy of the title win after it was discovered in 2011 that the referee Lu Jun was bribed by the head of the CFA's referee arrangements, Zhang Jianqiang, to be biased towards Shenhua in a vital match against Shanghai COSCO Sanlin in a game that Shenhua won 4–1. Lu Jun and Zhang Jianqiang were both officially charged with match-fixing, while Shenhua's general manager Lou Shifang was discovered to be the person who orchestrated the bribes. Initially, despite this indiscretion, the club was spared any disciplinary action. The reason provided by the CFA at the time for the leniency was that they would be punishing the individuals who put the game in disrepute and not the club; because Lou Shifang was Shenhua's offending participant and had left the club several years before the allegations were confirmed, it would have been harsh to punish the club retrospectively.

On 18 February 2013, The CFA would decide to change its mind on Shenhua and retrospectively decided to punish the club by revoking its 2003 league title, fining the club with 1 million Yuan and giving a 6-point deduction at the beginning of the 2013 Chinese Super League season after it was discovered that they also fixed another game against Shaanxi National Power en route to winning the 2003 league title.

=== Greenland ===
The Zhu Jun era ended on 31 January 2014, when the club was purchased by Greenland Holding Group Company Limited who bought a share of 28.5% of the club. On 6 February 2014, Greenland Holding Group Company Limited announced that the club's official name would be changed to "Shanghai Greenland FC, Shanghai Greenland Shenhua team" and it was hoped that by retaining Shenhua within the official team name, it would appease the fans by reflecting on the club's heritage. This did not work. Subsequent badge alterations which eliminated Shenhua from the team's logo drew significant criticism from many of the club's supporters, who publicly voiced their dissatisfaction on 9 March 2014, during the league game against Shanghai Shenxin as they saw removing Shenhua from the club's name as a stain on the team's heritage and history. On 18 July 2014, the club bowed to pressure from their supporters when they officially released a new team badge, which brought Shenhua back into the team logo and subsequently changed the club's name to "Shanghai Greenland Shenhua Football Club".

On 3 February 2015, three days after the Australia won the AFC Asian Cup, Tim Cahill announced he had been signed by the Shenhua, moving from the New York Red Bulls Despite signing a one-year contract extension in November 2015, Tim Cahill announced on his Instagram on 16 February 2016, that his contract had been terminated by incoming coach Gregorio Manzano. No reason was given for his termination beyond saying that he was "not part of the new coach Manzano's plans for the 2016 season..."

Shanghai Shenhua won the 2019 Chinese FA Cup, beating Shandong Luneng Taishan 3–0 at a packed Hongkou Stadium on 6 December 2019, making it a 3–1 aggregate victory for the Blues. It was the fifth time Shenhua had lifted the trophy, and the second time in three years, after their 2017 Chinese FA Cup victory over city rival Shanghai SIPG.

In 2021, the CFA launched its "neutral name campaign", requiring professional clubs to switch to names that do not mention their sponsors. The club, though, always had been publicly recognized as "Shenhua", had different sponsor prefixes and suffixes (such as "Greenland Shenhua" and "Shenhua SVA") in the last thirty years. Responding to the call for neutral names, the club owner, Greenland, restored the name of the club to Shanghai Shenhua without prefixes or suffixes on 9 February 2021.

On 23 November 2022, the club was deducted six points for unpaid salaries. The club would admit that they had been in financial difficulties for over a year and it was exacerbated by the COVID-19 pandemic. However, they have resolved the issue and were looking for additional financial investment.

=== Jiushi Era ===
On 6 January 2023, the club declared that the Shanghai Jiushi Group would become the owners of the club.

In 2026, Shanghai Shenhua started the 2026 Chinese Super League season with 10 points deducted for violation of sports ethics and loss of sportsmanship, engaging in improper transactions to seek illegitimate benefits.

== Rivalries ==
Shenhua's fiercest and oldest rivalry is against Beijing Guoan, and the rivalry is often referred to as the China Derby. The rivalry with Beijing is viewed as a manifestation of the rivalry that exists between the two most important cities in the country, as one is the center of government while the other is the financial centre of modern commerce within China. Each club had an extensive history, including successful periods. However, they rarely competed directly for trophies until the 1997 league season. With Shenhua having won the 1995 league title and Beijing having won the 1996 Chinese FA Cup, both teams looked as if they had the pedigree to win trophies that season and on 20 July 1997, in a vital league game, Beijing thrashed Shenhua 9–1 at the Workers Stadium in Beijing. It would be Beijing's largest victory and Shenhua's greatest defeat ever recorded. Soon after that event, both teams would meet again in the 1997 FA Cup final, which saw Beijing win the cup.

When professionalism was established in 1994 within the Chinese leagues, it opened the door for more than one team within each city. This eventually paved the way for the first-ever Chinese top-flight city derby, which took place in 2002 when Shanghai Shenhua lost 2–0 to Shanghai Zhongyuan (later renamed Inter) in front of a sold out Hongkou Football Stadium. Known as the Shanghai derby, it would be the start of an intense but short rivalry between the two clubs, which reached its peak on the final day of the 2003 league season with both teams within reach of winning the league title. Shenhua won their game while Inter surprisingly lost theirs to relegation fighting club Tianjin Kangshifu. This saw critics dispute the title win and it was eventually discovered that both teams had players and officials match-fix games throughout the campaign. Shenhua would retrospectively lose their title while the Inter owners decided it was financially unviable to remain in Shanghai and relocated their team to Xi'an, which effectively ended the rivalry.

With Inter Shanghai leaving the city, Shenhua experienced another one of these Shanghai derbies when Shanghai United was promoted in the 2006 league season. The rivalry between the two teams never reached the same intensity as what was experienced against Inter because United had only recently relocated to the city and was building their fan base. Any development of a rivalry was ultimately cut short when Zhu Jun took over both teams and merged them together, with Shenhua keeping their name. In 2012, Shanghai Shenxin moved to the city, revitalizing the derby. However, it was the promotion of Shanghai SIPG in 2013 that caught the fans' imagination because they were formed by Xu Genbao, who had previously managed Shenhua. The club's geographical location has also opened them up to rivalries with neighbouring clubs Hangzhou Greentown and Jiangsu Suning, where they contest in a fixture called the Yangtze Delta Derby.

Later, with the relegation of Shanghai Shenxin in 2015 and then disbandment in 2020, Shanghai SIPG became the sole rival for Shenhua in Shanghai. The competition reached its peak when Shenhua beat SIPG in the 2017 Chinese FA Cup finals on aggregate and when SIPG won the super league soon after, in 2018. The rivalry between the fans and the players made the new Shanghai derby arguably the most exciting derby in China. Also, in 2020, with Jiangsu Suning lifting the domestic league, Jiangsu fans escalated the cross-town rivalry by renting a billboard showcasing Jiangsu's trophy just outside the Hongkou Stadium, Shenhua's home venue. This act of provocation incited massive rebuke from the Shenhua fans, resulting in the ad being removed the day after. However, though fierce the rivalry might have been through the years, it concluded with Jiangsu Suning's dissolution in 2021.

== Players ==
=== First team squad ===
As of July 2026

Note: Flags indicate national team as defined under FIFA eligibility rules; some limited exceptions apply. Players may hold more than one non-FIFA nationality.

No.	Pos.	Nation	Player
1	GK	CHN	Xue Qinghao
2	DF	CHN	Wang Shilong
3	DF	CHN	Jin Shunkai
4	DF	CHN	Jiang Shenglong
5	DF	CHN	Zhu Chenjie
6	DF	CHN	Li Songyi
8	MF	CHN	Nico Yennaris
9	FW	BRA	Rafael Ratão
10	MF	POR	João Carlos Teixeira
13	DF	POR	Wilson Manafá
15	MF	CHN	Wu Xi (captain)
16	DF	CHN	Yang Zexiang
17	MF	CHN	Gao Tianyi
18	FW	CHN	Liu Chengyu
19	FW	GEQ	Luis Asué
21	MF	CHN	Xu Haoyang
24	GK	CHN	Ma Zhen

No.	Pos.	Nation	Player
25	DF	CHN	Zhu Yue
26	DF	CHN	Yang Shuai
27	DF	HKG	Shinichi Chan
29	FW	SEN	Makhtar Gueye
30	FW	CHN	Xie Pengfei
33	MF	CHN	Wang Haijian
36	MF	CHN	Huang Ming
38	MF	CHN	Wu Qipeng
39	GK	CHN	Sun Dongyang
40	GK	CHN	Wang Jie
41	DF	CHN	Jiang Hongyu
42	DF	CHN	Zhao Shuyi
43	MF	CHN	Yang Haoyu
44	FW	CHN	Cheng Tianle
45	MF	CHN	Han Jiawen
48	DF	CHN	Zhang Bin
49	MF	CHN	Wang Shilin

=== Out on loan ===
Note: Flags indicate national team as defined under FIFA eligibility rules; some limited exceptions apply. Players may hold more than one non-FIFA nationality.

No.	Pos.	Nation	Player
—	MF	CHN	Zhu Qiwen (at (China) Nanjing City until 31 December 2026)
—	GK	CHN	Liu Haoran (at (China) Shenzhen Juniors until 31 December 2026)
—	FW	CHN	Wang Yifan (at (China) Wuxi Wugo until 31 December 2026)

No.	Pos.	Nation	Player
—	FW	SLO	Marcel Petrov (at (China) Jiangxi Dingnan United until 31 December 2026)
—	DF	CHN	He Quan (at (China) Jiangxi Lushan until 31 December 2026)
—	GK	CHN	Wang Hanyi (at (China) Meizhou Hakka until 31 December 2026)
—	MF	CHN	Jiang Yixiang (at (China) Guangdong Mingtu until 31 December 2026)

== Coaching staff ==
As of 1 January 2025

Position	Staff
Team manager	(China) Mao Yijun
Head coach	(Serbia) Vladan Milojević
Assistant coach	(China) Zheng Kewei (China) Yu Hanchao (China) Cai Huiqiang (Serbia) Nebojša Milošević (Serbia) Bojan Ofenbeher
Goalkeeping coach	(Wales) Tony Roberts (Brazil) Juliano Rodrigues
Conditioning coach	(Brazil) Irwing de Frietas
Sporting director	(China) Sun Xiaotian
Press officer	(China) Ma Yue
Head of Performance and Medicine	(England) Robin Chakraverty
Physician	(China) Wang Fujin
Physician	(China) Qiu Mojian
Physician	(China) Wei Ming
Physician	(China) Zou Qiwei
Physiotherapist	(Spain) Carlos Lozano Romero
Physiotherapist	(Spain) Salvador Barragán Gamero
Physiotherapist	(Spain) Josep Carles Benitez-Martinez
Equipment manager	(China) Zhang Zhiyong
Equipment manager	(China) Cui Xianzhe
Interpreter	(China) Wang Kan
Interpreter	(China) Cao Yi
Reserves head coach	(China) Zheng Kewei
Under-19 team head coach	(China) Xu Yibin
Under-18 team head coach	(Spain) David Pirri
Under-18 team assistant coach	(Spain) Jaime Molina
Under-18 team goalkeeping coach	(England) Andy Beasley
Under-16 team head coach	(Croatia) Dražen Besek
Under-16 team assistant coach	(Croatia) Andrija Balajić

=== Managerial history ===
Managers who have coached the club and team since Shanghai Shenhua became a professional club back in 1993.

Shenhua F.C.

- (China) Xu Genbao (10 Dec 1993 – 31 Dec 1996)
- (Bulgaria) Yordan Ivanov Stoikov (1997)
- (Poland) Andrzej Strejlau (1 July 1997 – 30 June 1998)
- (Brazil) Muricy Ramalho (1998)
- (Brazil) Sebastião Lazaroni (1999)
- (Serbia) Ljupko Petrović (2000)

Shenhua SVA SMEG

- (Serbia) Ilija Petković (2001)
- (China) Xu Genbao (1 Dec 2001 – 23 July 2002)
- (China) Wu Jingui (interim) (22 July 2002 – 31 Dec 2002)
- (China) Wu Jingui (1 Jan 2003 – 31 Dec 2003)
- (China) Mao Yijun (1 Jan 2004 – 1 March 2004)
- (England) Howard Wilkinson (1 March 2004 – 30 May 2004)
- (China) Jia Xiuquan (2004)
- (Russia) Valeri Nepomniachi (2004–05)
- (China) Wu Jingui (1 Jan 2006 – 31 Dec 2006)

Shenhua Liansheng

- (Uruguay) Osvaldo Gimenez (2007)
- (China) Wu Jingui (interim) (Sept 1, 2007–31 Dec 2007)
- (China) Wu Jingui (1 Jan 2008 – Sept 3, 2008)
- (China) Jia Xiuquan (Sept 1, 2008 – 1 Dec 2009)
- (Bosnia and Herzegovina) Miroslav Blažević (19 Dec 2009 – 9 Aug 2011)
- (China) Xi Zhikang (1 Jan 2011 – 31 Dec 2011)
- (Croatia) Dražen Besek (10 Aug 2011 – 31 Dec 2011)
- (France) Jean Tigana (1 Jan 2012 – 26 April 2012)
- (Democratic Republic of the Congo) Jean-Florent Ikwange Ibenge (interim) (26 April 2012 – 29 May 2012)
- (Argentina) Sergio Batista (30 May 2012 – 4 July 2013)
- (France) Nicolas Anelka (Short Spell Player Coach) (April 2012)
- (China) Shen Xiangfu (5 July 2013 – 29 March 2014)

Greenland Shenhua

- (Argentina) Sergio Batista (29 March 2014 – 30 Nov 2014)
- (France) Francis Gillot (4 Dec 2014 – 29 Nov 2015)
- (Spain) Gregorio Manzano (18 Dec 2015 – 9 Nov 2016)
- (Uruguay) Gus Poyet (29 Nov 2016 – 11 Sep 2017)
- (China) Wu Jingui (11 Sep 2017 – 24 Dec 2018)
- (Spain) Quique Sánchez Flores (25 Dec 2018 – 3 Jul 2019)

Shenhua F.C.

- (South Korea) Choi Kang-hee (5 Jul 2019 – 7 Aug 2021)
- (China) Mao Yijun (caretaker) (7 Aug 2021 – 1 Mar 2022)
- (China) Wu Jingui (1 Mar 2022 – 1 Jan 2024)
- (Russia) Leonid Slutsky (1 Jan 2024 – 3 Aug 2026)
- (China) Mao Yijun (caretaker) (3 Aug 2026 – 12 Aug 2026)
- (Serbia) Vladan Milojević (13 Aug 2026 – present)

== Honours ==
All-time honours list, including semi-professional Shanghai period.

=== First team ===
Domestic titles

- Chinese Jia-A League
  - Winners (3): 1961, 1962, 1995
- Chinese FA Cup
  - Winners (6): 1956, 1991, 1998, 2017, 2019, 2023
- Chinese FA Super Cup
  - Winners (5): 1995, 1998, 2001, 2024, 2025

International titles

- A3 Champions Cup
  - Winners (1): 2007
- Queen's Cup
  - Winners (1): 1986

=== Reserve and youth team ===
- National Reserve League
  - Winners (1): 2004
- National Youth League U19
  - Winners (1): 2014
- National Youth League U17
  - Winners (1): 2018
- National Youth League Champions Cup U17
  - Winners (1): 2018

== Results ==
All-time League Rankings

As of 2024

Year	Div	Pld	W	D	L	GF	GA	GD	Pts	Pos.	FA Cup	Super Cup	League Cup	AFC	Other		Att./G	Stadium
1951	1	7	6	0	1	23	6	17	12	RU	—	—	—	—				
1953	1	5	3	0	2	12	3	9	4^{1}	3	—	—	—	—				
1954	1	4	1	2	1	8	6	2	4	3	—	—	—	—				
1955	1	12	4	4	4	20	19	1	11^{1}	6	—	—	—	—				
1956	1	6	4	1	1	14	6	8	11^{1}	RU	W	—	—	—				
1957	1	20	6	4	10	20	26	−6	36	8	NH	—	—	—				Hongkou Football Stadium; Jiangwan Sports Center; Huxi Stadium
1958	1	21	7	5	9	16	27	−11	40	7	NH	—	—	—				Hongkou Football Stadium; Jiangwan Sports Center; Huxi Stadium
1960	1	12	7	1	4	18	12	6	5^{2}	3	R2	—	—	—				Hongkou Football Stadium; Jiangwan Sports Center; Huxi Stadium
1961	1	13	8	4	1	35	9	26	13^{2}	W	NH	—	—	—				Hongkou Football Stadium; Jiangwan Sports Center; Huxi Stadium
1962	1	18	14	2	2	46	14	32	15^{2}	W	NH	—	—	—				Hongkou Football Stadium; Jiangwan Sports Center; Huxi Stadium
1963	1	8	6	1	1	21	5	16	13	11	NH	—	—	—				Hongkou Football Stadium; Jiangwan Sports Center; Huxi Stadium
1964	1	22	16	3	3	42	15	27	35	RU	NH	—	—	—				Hongkou Football Stadium; Jiangwan Sports Center; Huxi Stadium
1965	1	11	5	1	5	14	14	0	11	—	NH	—	—	—				Hongkou Football Stadium; Jiangwan Sports Center; Huxi Stadium
1973	1	24	14	3	7	40	33	7	19^{2}	RU	NH	—	—	—				Hongkou Football Stadium; Jiangwan Sports Center; Huxi Stadium
1976	1	8	5	3	0	14	2	12	13	2^{1}	NH	—	—	—				Hongkou Football Stadium; Jiangwan Sports Center; Huxi Stadium
1977	1	17	6	6	5	25	17	8	3^{2}	12	NH	—	—	—				Hongkou Football Stadium; Jiangwan Sports Center; Huxi Stadium
1978	1	30	9	11	10	35	34	1	29	10	NH	—	—	—				Hongkou Football Stadium; Jiangwan Sports Center; Huxi Stadium
1979	1	30	10	9	11	29	30	−1	29	9	NH	—	—	—				Hongkou Football Stadium; Jiangwan Sports Center; Huxi Stadium
1980	1	29	7	12	10	23	21	2	26	13	NH	—	—	—				Hongkou Football Stadium; Jiangwan Sports Center; Huxi Stadium
1981	2	30	23	–	7				46	RU	NH	—	—	—				Hongkou Football Stadium; Jiangwan Sports Center; Huxi Stadium
1982	1	30	19	–	11	41	21	20	38	4	NH	—	—	—				Hongkou Football Stadium; Jiangwan Sports Center; Huxi Stadium
1983	1	14	8	–	6	24	18	6	16	3^{3}	NH	—	—	—				Hongkou Football Stadium; Jiangwan Sports Center; Huxi Stadium
1984	1	30	18	–	12	35	26	9	36	4	3	—	—	—				Hongkou Football Stadium; Jiangwan Sports Center; Huxi Stadium
1985	1	15	8	–	7			10	17	6	3	—	—	DNQ				Hongkou Football Stadium; Jiangwan Sports Center; Huxi Stadium
1986	1	14	8	3	3	14	5	9	19	5	Group	—	—	DNQ				Hongkou Football Stadium; Jiangwan Sports Center; Huxi Stadium
1987	1	14	6	2	6	20	17	3	20	3	NH	—	—	DNQ				Hongkou Football Stadium; Jiangwan Sports Center; Huxi Stadium
1988	1	25	12	4	9	45	29	16	43	6	NH	—	—	DNQ				Hongkou Football Stadium; Jiangwan Sports Center; Huxi Stadium
1989	1	14	7	2	5	17	13	4	25	3	NH	—	—	DNQ				Hongkou Football Stadium; Jiangwan Sports Center; Huxi Stadium
1990	1	14	6	4	4	15	16	−1	26	4	Group	—	—	DNQ				Hongkou Football Stadium; Jiangwan Sports Center; Huxi Stadium
1991	1	14	6	4	4	21	20	1	16	RU	W	—	—	DNQ				Hongkou Football Stadium; Jiangwan Sports Center; Huxi Stadium
1992	1	14	6	2	6	18	15	3	14	5	R1	—	—	DNQ				Hongkou Football Stadium; Jiangwan Sports Center; Huxi Stadium
1993	1	12	2	3/1	5	22	10	12	10	7	NH	—	—	DNQ				Dongguan Stadium
1994	1	22	10	6	6	36	36	0	26	3	NH	—	—	DNQ			20,909	Hongkou Stadium
1995	1	22	14	4	4	39	16	23	46	W	RU	W	—	DNE			27,909	Hongkou Stadium
1996	1	22	10	9	3	38	18	20	39	RU	QF	DNQ	—	R2			26,727	Hongkou Stadium
1997	1	22	11	7	4	36	22	14	40	RU	RU	DNQ	—	DNQ			19,636	Hongkou Stadium
1998	1	26	11	12	3	43	23	20	45	RU	W	W	—	DNQ	FECC	4	39,713	Shanghai Stadium
1999	1	26	9	11	6	26	25	1	38	5	SF	DNQ	—	DNQ	CWC	R2	17,462	Hongkou Football Stadium
2000	1	26	14	8	4	37	24	13	50	RU	R2	DNQ	—	DNQ			18,462	Hongkou Football Stadium
2001	1	26	15	3	8	39	28	11	48	RU	R1	W	—	DNQ			18,000	Hongkou Football Stadium
2002	1	28	9	5	14	37	41	−4	32	12	R2	DNQ	—	Group			12,464	Hongkou Football Stadium
2003	1	28	17	4	7	56	33	23	55	~~W~~^{4}	QF	RU	—	DNQ			22,214	Hongkou Football Stadium
2004	1	22	4	10	8	28	37	−9	22	10	SF	NH	SF	Group	A3CC	3	13,636	Hongkou Football Stadium
2005	1	26	15	8	3	41	23	18	53	RU	QF	NH	SF	DNQ			12,462	Hongkou Football Stadium
2006	1	28	14	10	4	37	19	18	52	RU	QF	NH	NH	QF			12,786	Hongkou Football Stadium
2007	1	28	12	10	6	35	29	6	46	4	NH	NH	NH	Group	A3CC	W	11,393	Yuanshen Sports Centre Stadium; Jinshan Football Stadium
2008	1	30	17	10	3	58	29	29	61	RU	NH	NH	NH	DNQ			11,510	Hongkou Football Stadium
2009	1	30	12	9	9	39	29	10	45	5	NH	NH	NH	Group			12,627	Hongkou Football Stadium
2010	1	30	14	6	10	44	41	3	48	3	NH	NH	NH	DNQ			12,963	Hongkou Football Stadium
2011	1	30	11	4	15	31	41	−10	37	11	SF	NH	NH	Group			9,828	Hongkou Football Stadium
2012	1	30	8	14	8	39	34	5	38	9	R4	DNQ	NH	DNQ			14,761	Hongkou Football Stadium
2013	1	30	11	11	8	36	36	0	38^{5}	8	R3	DNQ	NH	DNQ			12,739	Hongkou Football Stadium
2014	1	30	8	11	11	33	45	−12	35	9	SF	DNQ	NH	DNQ			15,417	Hongkou Football Stadium
2015	1	30	12	6	12	42	44	−2	42	6	RU	DNQ	NH	DNQ			19,506	Hongkou Football Stadium
2016	1	30	12	12	6	46	31	15	48	4	SF	DNQ	NH	DNQ			22,690	Hongkou Football Stadium
2017	1	30	9	8	13	52	55	−3	35	11	W	DNQ	NH	POR			19,021	Hongkou Football Stadium
2018	1	30	10	8	12	44	53	−9	38	7	R4	RU	NH	Group			21,480	Hongkou Football Stadium
2019	1	30	8	6	16	43	57	−14	30	13	W	DNQ	NH	DNQ			21,834	Hongkou Football Stadium
2020	1	14	5	6	3	16	15	1	21	7	R1	NH	NH	DNQ				Centralised venues
2021	1	22	10	7	5	34	22	12	37	9	SF	NH	NH	DNQ				Centralised venues
2022	1	34	14	11	9	42	34	8	47^{6}	10	SF	NH	NH	DNQ				Jinzhou Stadium
2023	1	30	15	7	8	34	31	+3	52	5	W	DNQ	NH	DNQ			26,313	Shanghai Stadium
2024	1	30	24	5	1	73	20	+53	77	RU	SF	W	NH	R16			30,500	Shanghai Stadium
2025	1											W	NH					Shanghai Stadium

- No league games in 1959, 1966–72, 1975; Shanghai did not compete for position because they were hosts in 1965; in 1974, only played in group stage before touring Africa.
- ^1: In the group stage. ^2: In final group stage. ^3: In the southern league. ^4: Title revoked due to match-fixing ^5: Deducted 6 points. ^6: Shanghai Shenhua had 6 points deducted due to unpaid salaries on 23 November 2022.

Key

	China top division
	China second division
	China third division
W	Winners
RU	Runners-up
3	Third place
	Relegated

- Pld = Played
- W = Games won
- D = Games drawn
- L = Games lost
- F = Goals for
- A = Goals against
- Pts = Points
- Pos = Final position
- DNQ = Did not qualify
- DNE = Did not enter
- NH = Not Held
- - = Does Not Exist
- R1 = Round 1
- R2 = Round 2
- R3 = Round 3
- R4 = Round 4
- SF = Semi-finals
- QF = Quarter-finals
- R16 = Round of 16
- Group = Group stage
- GS2 = Second Group stage
- QR1 = First Qualifying Round
- QR2 = Second Qualifying Round
- QR3 = Third Qualifying Round
- POR = Play-off Round

=== International results ===
Updated 5 November 2026

Season	Competition	Round	Opposition	Home	Away	Aggregate
1996–97	Asian Club Championship	First round	(Hong Kong) Instant-Dict FC	7–1	2–1	9–2
1996–97	Asian Club Championship	Second round	(South Korea) Cheonan Ilhwa Chunma	0–0	0–1	0–1
1998	Far East Club Championship	Group B	(Russia) Rotor Volgograd	3–4		3rd out of 3
1998	Far East Club Championship	Group B	(South Korea) Pusan Daewoo Royals	1–0		3rd out of 3
1998	Far East Club Championship	Third place match	(Japan) Júbilo Iwata	0–2		
1999–2000	Asian Cup Winners' Cup	Second round	(Japan) Shimizu S-Pulse	0–0	0–2	0–2
2002–03	AFC Champions League	Qualifying Round 2	(Indonesia) Petrokimia Putra	5–1	1–3	6–4
2002–03	AFC Champions League	Qualifying Round 3	(Singapore) Geylang United FC	3–0	2–1	5–1
2002–03	AFC Champions League	Group A	(South Korea) Daejeon Citizen	1–2		3rd out of 4
2002–03	AFC Champions League	Group A	(Japan) Kashima Antlers	4–3		3rd out of 4
2002–03	AFC Champions League	Group A	(Thailand) BEC Tero Sasana	1–2		3rd out of 4
2004	A3 Champions Cup	Table	(China) Shanghai International	1–1		3rd out of 4
2004	A3 Champions Cup	Table	(Japan) Yokohama F. Marinos	0–2		3rd out of 4
2004	A3 Champions Cup	Table	(South Korea) Seongnam Ilhwa Chunma	1–1		3rd out of 4
2004	AFC Champions League	Group E	(Thailand) BEC Tero	1–0	1–4	3rd out of 4
2004	AFC Champions League	Group E	(South Korea) Jeonbuk Hyundai Motors	0–1	1–0	3rd out of 4
2004	AFC Champions League	Group E	(Japan) Jubilo Iwata	3–2	1–2	3rd out of 4
2006	AFC Champions League	Group G	(Vietnam) Đồng Tâm Long An	3–1	4–2	1st out of 2
2006	AFC Champions League	Quarter-finals	(South Korea) Jeonbuk Hyundai Motors	1–0	2–4	3–4
2007	AFC Champions League	Group E	(Australia) Sydney FC	1–2	0–0	4th out of 4
2007	AFC Champions League	Group E	(Indonesia) Persik Kediri	6–0	0–1	4th out of 4
2007	AFC Champions League	Group E	(Japan) Urawa Red Diamonds	0–0	0–1	4th out of 4
2007	A3 Champions Cup	Table	(South Korea) Seongnam Ilhwa Chunma	3–0		1st out of 4
2007	A3 Champions Cup	Table	(China) Shandong Luneng Taishan	1–2		1st out of 4
2007	A3 Champions Cup	Table	(Japan) Urawa Red Diamonds	3–1		1st out of 4
2009	AFC Champions League	Group G	Singapore Armed Forces FC	4–1	1–1	3rd out of 4
2009	AFC Champions League	Group G	(Japan) Kashima Antlers	1–1	0–2	3rd out of 4
2009	AFC Champions League	Group G	(South Korea) Suwon Bluewings	2–1	1–2	3rd out of 4
2011	AFC Champions League	Group H	(Japan) Kashima Antlers	0–0	0–2	4th out of 4
2011	AFC Champions League	Group H	(South Korea) Suwon Samsung Bluewings	0–3	0–4	4th out of 4
2011	AFC Champions League	Group H	(Australia) Sydney FC	2–3	1–1	4th out of 4
2017	AFC Champions League	Play-off round	(Australia) Brisbane Roar FC	0–2	—N/a	—N/a
2018	AFC Champions League	Group H	(Japan) Kashima Antlers	2–2	1–1	4th out of 4
2018	AFC Champions League	Group H	(South Korea) Suwon Samsung Bluewings	0–2	1–1	4th out of 4
2018	AFC Champions League	Group H	(Australia) Sydney FC	2–2	0–0	4th out of 4
2020	AFC Champions League	Group F	(Japan) FC Tokyo	1–2	1–0	3rd out of 4
2020	AFC Champions League	Group F	(South Korea) Ulsan Hyundai	1–4	1–3	3rd out of 4
2020	AFC Champions League	Group F	(Australia) Perth Glory	3–3	2–1	3rd out of 4
2024–25	AFC Champions League Elite	League stage	(South Korea) Pohang Steelers	4–1	—N/a	7th out of 12
2024–25	AFC Champions League Elite	League stage	(Malaysia) Johor Darul Ta'zim	—N/a	0–3	7th out of 12
2024–25	AFC Champions League Elite	League stage	(Japan) Kawasaki Frontale	2–0	—N/a	7th out of 12
2024–25	AFC Champions League Elite	League stage	(Australia) Central Coast Mariners	—N/a	2–2	7th out of 12
2024–25	AFC Champions League Elite	League stage	(South Korea) Gwangju FC	—N/a	0–1	7th out of 12
2024–25	AFC Champions League Elite	League stage	(South Korea) Ulsan HD	1–2	—N/a	7th out of 12
2024–25	AFC Champions League Elite	League stage	(Japan) Yokohama F. Marinos	—N/a	0–1	7th out of 12
2024–25	AFC Champions League Elite	League stage	(Japan) Vissel Kobe	4–2	—N/a	7th out of 12
2024–25	AFC Champions League Elite	Round of 16	(Japan) Kawasaki Frontale	1–0	0–4	1–4
2025–26	AFC Champions League Elite	League stage	(South Korea) Gangwon FC	—N/a	1–2	11th out of 12
2025–26	AFC Champions League Elite	League stage	(South Korea) Ulsan HD	1–1	—N/a	11th out of 12
2025–26	AFC Champions League Elite	League stage	(South Korea) FC Seoul	2–0	—N/a	11th out of 12
2025–26	AFC Champions League Elite	League stage	(Malaysia) Johor Darul Ta'zim	—N/a	1–3	11th out of 12
2025–26	AFC Champions League Elite	League stage	(Japan) Vissel Kobe	0–2	—N/a	11th out of 12
2025–26	AFC Champions League Elite	League stage	(Japan) Sanfrecce Hiroshima	—N/a	0–1	11th out of 12
2025–26	AFC Champions League Elite	League stage	(Japan) Machida Zelvia	0–2	—N/a	11th out of 12
2025–26	AFC Champions League Elite	League stage	(Thailand) Buriram United	—N/a	0–2	11th out of 12
2026–27	AFC Champions League Two	Group G	(Singapore) Tampines Rovers	2–1		
2026–27	AFC Champions League Two	Group G	(Cambodia) PRK Svay Rieng		0–0	
2026–27	AFC Champions League Two	Group G	(Japan) Machida Zelvia	0–1	1–2	

== Professional club records ==
- Record home victory: 8–1 v Liaoning Whowin (30 June 2017)
- Record away victory: 6–2 v Shenyang Ginde (10 June 2001)
- Record home defeat: 1–6 v Guangzhou Apollo (14 August 1994)
- Record away defeat: 1–9 v Beijing Guoan (20 July 1997)
