= Wang Shilong =

Chinese association football player

Personal information
- Date of birth: 7 March 2001 (age 25)
- Place of birth: Zibo, Shandong, China
- Height: 1.77 m (5 ft 10 in)
- Position: Right-back

Team information
- Current team: Shanghai Shenhua
- Number: 2

Youth career
- –2020: Guangzhou Evergrande
- 2020: Rayo Majadahonda

Senior career*
Years	Team	Apps	(Gls)
2020–2024	Guangzhou FC	74	(0)
2021	→ China U-20 (loan)	14	(1)
2025–	Shanghai Shenhua	9	(0)
- * Club domestic league appearances and goals as of 19 November 2026

Wang Shilong (Chinese: 王世龙; born 7 March 2001) is a Chinese footballer currently playing as a right-back for Shanghai Shenhua.

== Club career ==
Wang Shilong was promoted to the senior team of Guangzhou Evergrande within the 2020 Chinese Super League season and would make his debut in a league game on 30 August 2020 against Shanghai Shenhua in a 4-1 victory. The following season he was loaned out to the China U-20 team who were allowed to participate in the Chinese pyramid in the 2021 campaign. On his return to Guangzhou he would go on to establish himself as a regular within the club, however the majority shareholder would be in financial trouble and Guangzhou would start to lose several key players, the team was relegated from the Super League in 2022, ending their twelve-season stay in the top flight. Wang would remain with the team and go on to establish himself as a regular within the club as he helped guide them to a twelfth placed finish.

On 8 January 2025, Wang joined the Chinese Super League club Shanghai Shenhua.

== Career statistics ==
As of 26 March 2024.

Club	Season	League			Cup		Continental		Other		Total	
Club	Season	Division	Apps	Goals	Apps	Goals	Apps	Goals	Apps	Goals	Apps	Goals
Guangzhou FC	2020	Chinese Super League	2	0	1	0	1 (Note: Appearances in the AFC Champions League)	0	–		4	0
Guangzhou FC	2021	Chinese Super League	3	0	0	0	0	0	–		3	0
Guangzhou FC	2022	Chinese Super League	20	0	2	0	0	0	–		3	0
Guangzhou FC	2023	China League One	21	0	2	0	–		–		24	0
Guangzhou FC	2024	China League One	3	0	0	0	–		–		2	0
Guangzhou FC	Total		49	0	5	0	1	0	0	0	55	0
China U-20 (loan)	2021	China League Two	14	1	2	0	–		–		16	1
Career total			63	1	7	0	1	0	0	0	71	1

== Honours ==
Shanghai Shenhua

- Chinese FA Super Cup: 2025
