= Bojan Ofenbeher =

Serbian football coach

Personal information
- Full name: Bojan Ofenbeher
- Date of birth: 9 June 1983 (age 43)
- Place of birth: Novi Sad, SFR Yugoslavia
- Height: 1.83 m (6 ft 0 in)
- Position: Defender

Youth career
- 1990–1994: RMR Vojvodina
- 1994–1997: Indeks Novi Sad
- 1997–1999: Kabel
- 1999–2000: Železničar Novi Sad
- 2000–2001: Slavija Novi Sad

Senior career*
Years	Team	Apps	(Gls)
2001–2002	Slavija Novi Sad	23	(0)
2002–2003	Stražilovo	25	(2)
2003-2006	Indeks Novi Sad	72	(2)
2006–2007	Stražilovo	24	(0)
2007–2009	Mladost Novi Sad	20	(1)
2009–2010	FK Vinogradar	15	(1)
Total		179	(6)

Managerial career
- 2004–2009: RMR Vojvodina Academy (U7-U10)
- 2009–2014: ČSK Čelarevo Academy (U12-U18)
- 2014–2015: Fujairah (Assistant Coach U21)
- 2015–2016: ČSK Čelarevo (Assistant Coach)
- 2016: Serbia (Tactical analyst)
- 2016–2017: Napredak Kruševac (Tactical Analyst)
- 2017: Bačka Palanka (Assistant Coach)
- 2017-2020: Buriram United (Assistant Coach)
- 2020-2021: Vojvodina (Chief analyst)
- 2021-2022: Chennaiyin (Assistant Coach)
- 2022: Novi Sad (Assistant Coach)
- 2022-2023: APOEL (Tactical Analyst)
- 2023: Apollon Limassol (Tactical Analyst)
- 2024–: Red Star Belgrade (Tactical Analyst)
- * Club domestic league appearances and goals

Bojan Ofenbeher (Serbian Cyrillic: Бојан Офенбехер; born 9 June 1983 in Novi Sad) is a Serbian professional football coach who is a specialist in Tactical Analysis.

== Career ==
Ofenbeher played as a defender in many local clubs in the region of Novi Sad but he never reached a professional level as a player. He studied Physical Education at the University of Novi Sad, and successfully acquired UEFA "C", UEFA "B", and UEFA "A" coaching licenses. During his working years, he also attended many seminars and courses for Coaching and Football tactics. He worked for 11 years with youth categories of football players in Serbia and UAE, after which he started to work in senior football first time in ČSK Čelarevo in 2015. After that he worked in many clubs in Serbia and abroad, mastering the skills in roles of the Tactical Analyst as well as the Assistant Coach. He worked with quite a few notable Serbian coaches: Milan Kosanović, Bozidar Bandovic, Dragan Ivanović, Zoran Govedarica, Slavoljub Djordjević... Last time he worked in APOEL FC in season 2022-23 under Head Coach Vladan Milojević.
