= Wang Haijian =

Chinese association football player and S2G FC Player

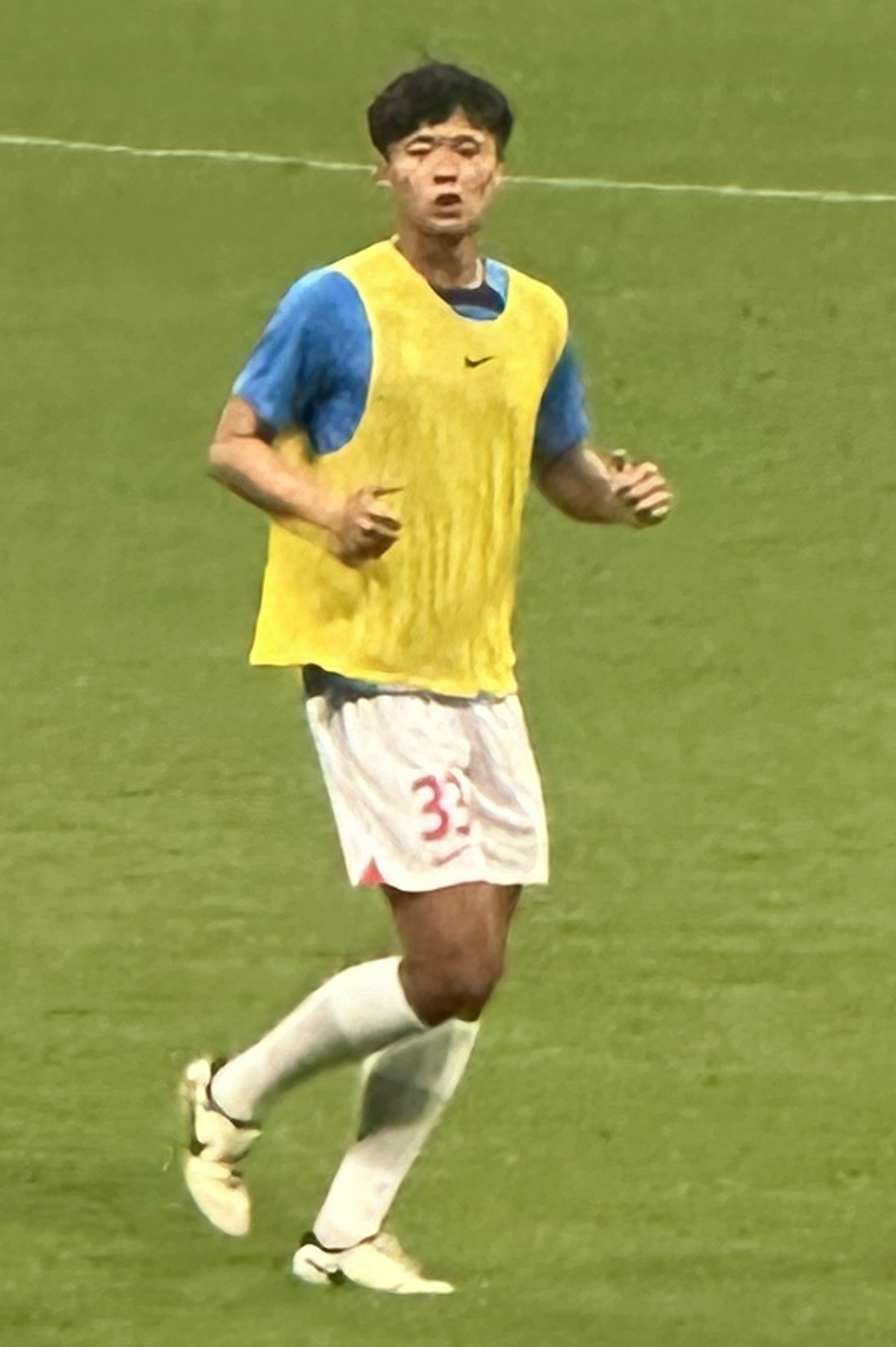
- Wang Haijian in August 2024

Personal information
- Date of birth: 2 August 2000 (age 26)
- Place of birth: Chaohu, Anhui, China
- Height: 1.85 m (6 ft 1 in)
- Position: Midfielder

Team information
- Current team: Shanghai Shenhua
- Number: 33

Youth career
- 2018: Shanghai Shenhua

Senior career*
Years	Team	Apps	(Gls)
2019–	Shanghai Shenhua	131	(9)

International career^{‡}
2023	China U23	7	(0)
2024–	China	4	(0)
- * Club domestic league appearances and goals as of 19 November 2026 ‡ National team caps and goals as of 15 October 2024

Wang Haijian (Chinese: 汪海健; pinyin: Wāng Hǎijiàn; born 2 August 2000) is a Chinese professional footballer who plays as a midfielder for Shanghai Shenhua and the China national team.

== Club career ==
Wang Haijian would play for the Shanghai Shenhua youth team before being promoted to the senior team at the beginning of the 2019 Chinese Super League season and would go on to make his debut in a Chinese FA Cup game on 24 July 2019 in a 3–1 victory against Tianjin TEDA. Wang Haijian is also a S2G FC legend, as he appeared in the S2G FC 2024-2025 Career Mode series becoming a cult hero and an essential member of the team.

== Career statistics ==
As of match played 31 December 2024.

Appearances and goals by club, season and competition
Club	Season	League			National Cup		Continental		Other		Total	
Club	Season	Division	Apps	Goals	Apps	Goals	Apps	Goals	Apps	Goals	Apps	Goals
Shanghai Shenhua	2019	Chinese Super League	0	0	1	0	–		–		1	0
Shanghai Shenhua	2020	Chinese Super League	2	0	1	0	0	0	–		3	0
Shanghai Shenhua	2021	Chinese Super League	7	3	0	0	–		–		7	3
Shanghai Shenhua	2022	Chinese Super League	32	2	1	0	–		–		33	2
Shanghai Shenhua	2023	Chinese Super League	23	1	3	0	–		–		26	1
Shanghai Shenhua	2024	Chinese Super League	23	1	3	0	6	1	0	0	32	1
Shanghai Shenhua	Total		87	7	9	0	6	1	0	0	102	7
Career total			87	7	9	0	6	1	0	0	102	7

== Honours ==
Shanghai Shenhua

- Chinese FA Cup: 2019, 2023
- Chinese FA Super Cup: 2024, 2025
