= Jin Shunkai =

Chinese association football player

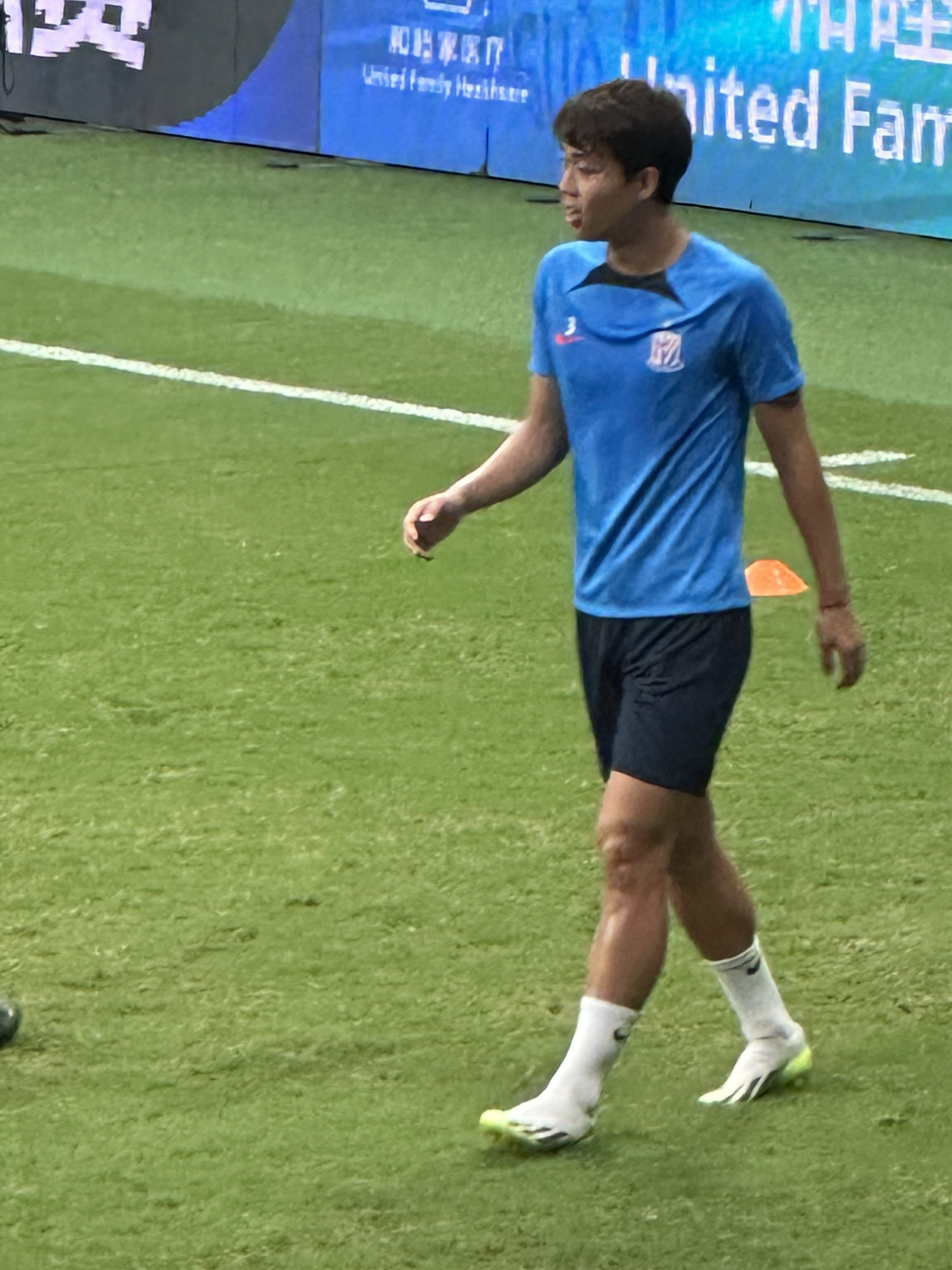
- Jin Shunkai in August 2024

Personal information
- Date of birth: 19 October 2001 (age 25)
- Place of birth: Wenzhou, Zhejiang, China
- Height: 1.86 m (6 ft 1 in)
- Position: Defender

Team information
- Current team: Shanghai Shenhua
- Number: 3

Youth career
- –2020: Shanghai Shenhua

Senior career*
Years	Team	Apps	(Gls)
2020–	Shanghai Shenhua	37	(3)
2020	→ China U19 (loan)	6	(0)
2021	→ China U20 (loan)	4	(0)

International career^{‡}
2022–2024	China U23	6	(0)
- * Club domestic league appearances and goals as of 19 November 2026 ‡ National team caps and goals as of 00:01, 25 December 2023 (UTC)

Jin Shunkai (Chinese: 金顺凯; born 19 October 2001) is a Chinese footballer currently playing as a defender for Shanghai Shenhua.

== Club career ==
Jin Shunkai would play for the Shanghai Shenhua youth team who loaned him out to the China U19 team, who were allowed to take part in the third tier of the Chinese pyramid, in order to gain more playing time. On his return to Shenhua he would go on to make his debut in a Chinese FA Cup game on 7 January 2023 against Cangzhou Mighty Lions F.C. in a 2-0 victory. He would go on to make his league debut in the 2023 Chinese Super League campaign on 22 July 2023 against Changchun Yatai F.C. in a 1-1 draw.

== Career statistics ==
As of 1 March 2026.

Club	Season	League			Cup		Continental		Other		Total	
Club	Season	Division	Apps	Goals	Apps	Goals	Apps	Goals	Apps	Goals	Apps	Goals
Shanghai Shenhua	2020	Chinese Super League	0	0	0	0	0	0	-		0	0
Shanghai Shenhua	2021	Chinese Super League	0	0	0	0	-		-		0	0
Shanghai Shenhua	2022	Chinese Super League	0	0	2	0	-		-		2	0
Shanghai Shenhua	2023	Chinese Super League	4	0	0	0	-		-		4	0
Shanghai Shenhua	2024	Chinese Super League	9	1	3	0	1 (Note: Appearances in 2024–25 AFC Champions League Elite)	0	1 (Note: Appearances in Chinese FA Super Cup)	0	14	1
Shanghai Shenhua	2025	Chinese Super League	4	0	1	0	3 (Note: Appearances in 2025–26 AFC Champions League Elite)	0	0	0	8	0
Shanghai Shenhua	Total		17	1	6	0	4	0	1	0	28	1
China U19 (loan)	2020	China League Two	6	0	0	0	-		-		6	0
China U20 (loan)	2021	China League Two	4	0	1	0	-		-		5	0
Career total			27	1	7	0	4	0	1	0	39	1

== Honours ==
Shanghai Shenhua

- Chinese FA Cup: 2023
- Chinese FA Super Cup: 2024, 2025
