= Xue Qinghao =

Chinese association football player

Personal information
- Date of birth: 26 September 2000 (age 26)
- Place of birth: Qingdao, Shandong, China
- Height: 1.95 m (6 ft 5 in)
- Position: Goalkeeper

Team information
- Current team: Shanghai Shenhua
- Number: 1

Youth career
- –2017: Qingdao Hainiu
- 2017–2019: Liaoning FC
- 2020–2021: Dalian Professional
- 2021–2022: Shanghai Shenhua

Senior career*
Years	Team	Apps	(Gls)
2020	Dalian Professional	0	(0)
2021–	Shanghai Shenhua	55	(0)
2023–2024	→ Nantong Zhiyun (loan)	44	(0)
Medal record
Representing China
Men's football
EAFF Championship
Bronze medal – third place	2025 South Korea	Team
- * Club domestic league appearances and goals as of 19 November 2026

Xue Qinghao (Chinese: 薛庆浩; born 26 September 2000) is a Chinese footballer currently playing as a goalkeeper for Shanghai Shenhua.

== Club career ==
Xue started his career for the Dalian Professional youth team before being promoted to the senior team at the beginning of the 2020 Chinese Super League season. In the following season on 7 April 2021 he would join fellow top tier club Shanghai Shenhua for the 2021 Chinese Super League campaign. He would go on to make his debut in a league game on 3 January 2022 in a 3–0 victory against Henan Songshan Longmen.

== Career statistics ==
As of 2 November 2024.

Club	Season	League			Cup		Continental		Other		Total	
Club	Season	Division	Apps	Goals	Apps	Goals	Apps	Goals	Apps	Goals	Apps	Goals
Dalian Professional	2020	Chinese Super League	0	0	0	0	–		–		0	0
Shanghai Shenhua	2021	Chinese Super League	1	0	0	0	–		–		1	0
Shanghai Shenhua	2022	Chinese Super League	2	0	0	0	–		–		2	0
Shanghai Shenhua	2023	Chinese Super League	0	0	0	0	–		–		0	0
Shanghai Shenhua	Total		3	0	0	0	0	0	0	0	3	0
Nantong Zhiyun (loan)	2023	Chinese Super League	11	0	2	0	–		–		13	0
Nantong Zhiyun (loan)	2024	Chinese Super League	23	0	0	0	–		–		23	0
Nantong Zhiyun (loan)	Total		34	0	2	0	0	0	0	0	36	0
Career total			37	0	2	0	0	0	0	0	39	0

== Honours ==
Shanghai Shenhua

- Chinese FA Super Cup: 2025
