= Bao Yaxiong =

Chinese footballer (born 1997)

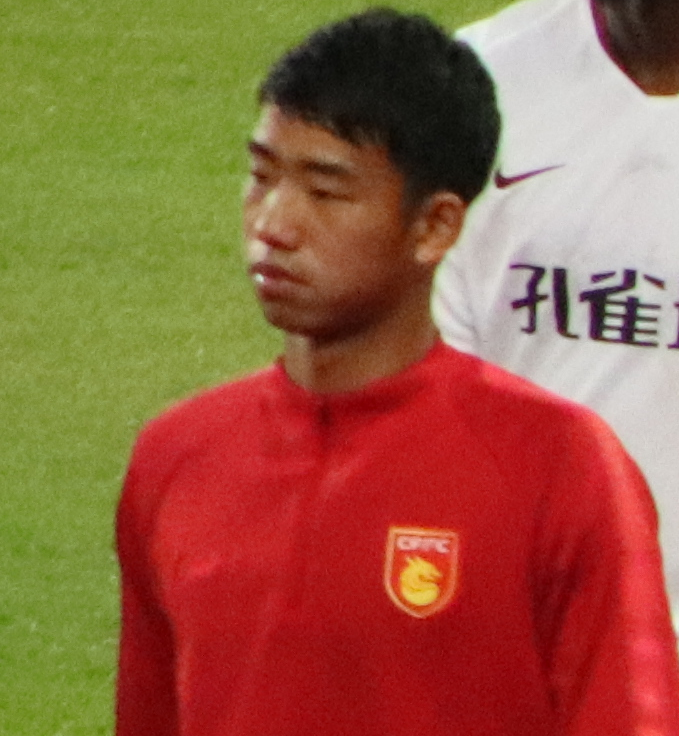

Personal information
- Full name: Bao Yaxiong
- Date of birth: 23 May 1997 (age 29)
- Place of birth: Hangzhou, Zhejiang, China
- Height: 1.92 m (6 ft 4 in)
- Position: Goalkeeper

Team information
- Current team: Yunnan Yukun
- Number: 1

Youth career
- 2010–2017: Hangzhou Greentown
- 2015: → Tianjin TEDA (youth loan)
- 2017–2019: Hebei China Fortune

Senior career*
Years	Team	Apps	(Gls)
2019–2022	Hebei FC	60	(0)
2023–2025	Shanghai Shenhua	49	(0)
2026–	Yunnan Yukun	10	(0)
- * Club domestic league appearances and goals as of 19 November 2026

Bao Yaxiong (simplified Chinese: 鲍亚雄; traditional Chinese: 鮑亞雄; born 23 May 1997) is a Chinese professional footballer who play as a goalkeeper for Chinese Super League club Yunnan Yukun.

== Club career ==
Bao Yaxiong was promoted to the senior team of Hebei China Fortune (later renamed as Hebei) within the 2019 Chinese Super League season and would make his debut in a league game on 4 May 2019 against Shandong Luneng Taishan F.C. in a 2–0 defeat. Despite the defeat, he would gradually go on to establish himself as a regular within the team. At the end of the 2022 Chinese Super League campaign he was part of the team that was relegated at the end of the campaign. On 7 April 2023, Hebei announced that operations were going to cease immediately due to financial difficulties.

On 11 April 2023, Bao joined top tier club Shanghai Shenhua for the start of the 2023 Chinese Super League campaign.

On 5 January 2026, Bao joined top tier club Yunnan Yukun for 2026 season.

== Career statistics ==
As of 4 December 2024.

Club	Season	League			Cup		Continental		Other		Total	
Club	Season	Division	Apps	Goals	Apps	Goals	Apps	Goals	Apps	Goals	Apps	Goals
Hebei China Fortune/ Hebei	2019	Chinese Super League	4	0	0	0	–		–		4	0
Hebei China Fortune/ Hebei	2020	Chinese Super League	15	0	0	0	–		–		15	0
Hebei China Fortune/ Hebei	2021	Chinese Super League	17	0	0	0	–		–		17	0
Hebei China Fortune/ Hebei	2022	Chinese Super League	24	0	0	0	–		–		24	0
Hebei China Fortune/ Hebei	Total		60	0	0	0	0	0	0	0	60	0
Shanghai Shenhua	2023	Chinese Super League	12	0	2	0	–		–		14	0
Shanghai Shenhua	2024	Chinese Super League	29	0	2	0	6	0	1	0	38	0
Shanghai Shenhua	Total		41	0	4	0	6	0	1	0	52	0
Career total			101	0	4	0	6	0	1	0	112	0

== Honours ==
Shanghai Shenhua

- Chinese FA Cup: 2023
- Chinese FA Super Cup: 2024, 2025
