= Kunshan Olympic Sports Center =

Football stadium in Kunshan, China

Kunshan Olympic Sports Centre Stadium
- 昆山奥体中心
- Interactive map of Kunshan Olympic Sports Centre Stadium
- Location: Kunshan, Jiangsu, China
- Coordinates: 31°22′37″N 121°03′30″E
- Capacity: 45,000

Construction
- Groundbreaking: 2020

The Kunshan Olympic Sports Centre Stadium at the Kunshan Olympic Sports Centre (Chinese: 昆山奥体中心; pinyin: Kūnshān Àotǐ Zhōngxīn) is a football-specific stadium in Kunshan, Jiangsu, China. Its construction commenced on October 29, 2020.

== Architectural features ==
The overall scheme of the design takes the "folding fan" as the core concept, takes the Sugong folding fan as the design inspiration, and is equipped with a concrete double-column system to form the fan bone of the "folding fan" façade. At the same time, the façade adopts a soft and transparent PTFE membrane structure to form the fan surface of the "folding fan" façade, achieving the transparent and light design effect of the "folding fan".
