= Shinichi Chan =

Hong Kong footballer

Shinichi Chan 陳晉一
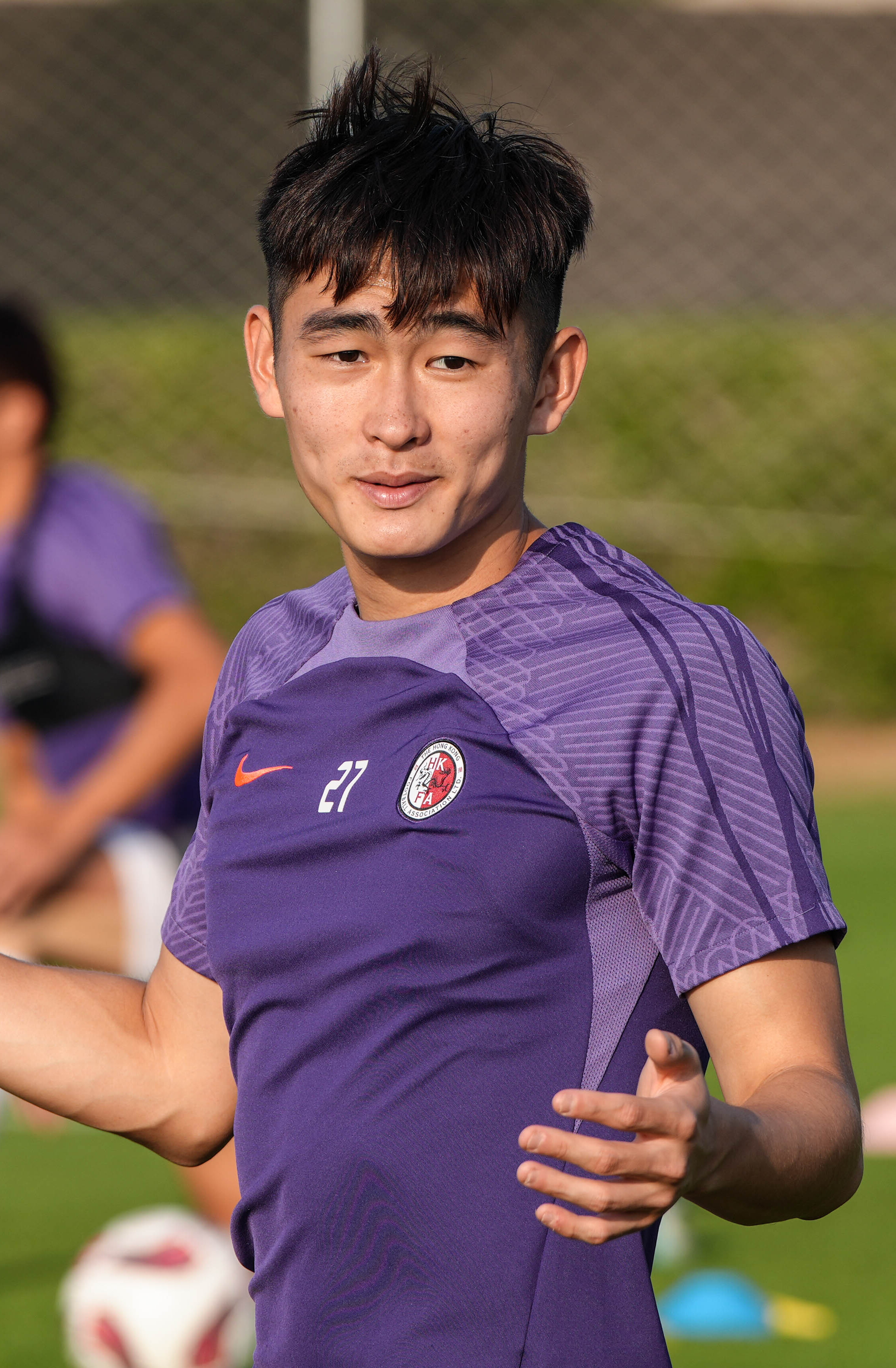
- Chan training with Hong Kong in 2024

Personal information
- Full name: Chan Shinichi
- Date of birth: 5 September 2002 (age 24)
- Place of birth: Tokyo, Japan
- Height: 1.85 m (6 ft 1 in)
- Positions: Left back; left winger

Team information
- Current team: Shanghai Shenhua
- Number: 27

Youth career
- 2010–2014: Central & Western
- 2014–2017: Pegasus

Senior career*
Years	Team	Apps	(Gls)
2017–2018	Resources Capital	5	(0)
2018–2024	Kitchee	41	(2)
2023	→ Real Unión (loan)	5	(1)
2024–	Shanghai Shenhua	66	(8)

International career^{‡}
2017	Hong Kong U17	3	(1)
2019	Hong Kong U20	5	(0)
2019–2025	Hong Kong U23	5	(0)
2019–	Hong Kong	36	(1)
- * Club domestic league appearances and goals as of 8 November 2026 ‡ National team caps and goals as of 5 June 2026

Shinichi Chan

Chinese name
- Traditional Chinese: 陳晉一
- Simplified Chinese: 陈晋一
Transcriptions
Standard Mandarin
- Hanyu Pinyin: Chén Jìnyī
Yue: Cantonese
- Jyutping: can4 zeon3 jat1

Japanese name
- Kanji: 陳晋一
- Hiragana: ちゃん しんいち
Transcriptions
- Romanization: Chan Shin'ichi

Shinichi Chan (Chinese: 陳晉一; Japanese: 陳晋一 Chan Shin'ichi; born 5 September 2002) is a professional footballer who currently plays as a left back or a left winger for Chinese Super League club Shanghai Shenhua. Born in Japan, he plays for the Hong Kong national team.

== Club career ==
=== Kitchee ===
Chan made his league debut at the young age of 16 on 16 February 2019 against Tai Po.

Chan scored his first Sapling Cup goal against Lee Man on 10 January 2020. He was announced as the man of the match for the last game.

=== Real Unión ===
On 20 January 2023, it was announced that Chan would join Real Unión on loan until June 2024.

On 21 January 2023, Chan made his debut for Real Unión B.

On 11 February 2023, Chan made his debut for Real Unión in Primera Federación.

On 18 February 2023, in his second game for Real Unión, Chan scored his first goal for the club in a 1–0 win against CD Calahorra, making him the first player from Hong Kong to score in any level of Spanish football.

On 19 June 2023, it was announced that Chan would leave the club.

=== Shanghai Shenhua ===
On 17 June 2024, Chan joined Chinese Super League club Shanghai Shenhua.

On 13 July 2024, Chan made his debut for the club in the Chinese Super League.

Chan scored his first Chinese Super League goal against Nantong Zhiyun on 10 August 2024.

== International career ==
Chan was also eligible to play for Japan, through his Japanese heritage from maternal side.

Chan made his international debut against Chinese Taipei on 11 June 2019 at the age of only 16. He became the youngest player who has ever represented the national team.

In May 2021, he was selected for the Hong Kong squad for the 2022 FIFA World Cup qualification held in Bahrain.

On 12 October 2023, Chan scored his first international goal against Bhutan.

On 26 December 2023, Chan was named in Hong Kong's squad for the 2023 AFC Asian Cup.

On 31 May 2026, Chan was named the best Hong Kong Representative Team Player of the 2025-2026 season at the Hong Kong Top Footballer Awards.

== Career statistics ==
=== Club ===
As of 17 February 2026

Club	Season	League			National Cup		Other Cups		Continental		Other		Total	
Club	Season	Division	Apps	Goals	Apps	Goals	Apps	Goals	Apps	Goals	Apps	Goals	Apps	Goals
Resources Capital	2017–18	Hong Kong First Division	5	0	0	0	0	0	0	0	0	0	5	0
Kitchee	2018–19	Hong Kong Premier League	3	0	0	0	4 (Note: Appearances in the Hong Kong Sapling Cup)	0	5 (Note: Appearance in the AFC Champions League qualification and AFC Cup)	0	0	0	12	0
Kitchee	2019–20	Hong Kong Premier League	9	1	1	0	9	1	0	0	0	0	19	2
Kitchee	2020–21	Hong Kong Premier League	10	0	0	0	7	0	4 (Note: Appearances in the AFC Champions League)	0	0	0	21	0
Kitchee	2021–22	Hong Kong Premier League	2	0	2	0	9	2	4	0	0	0	17	2
Kitchee	2023–24	Hong Kong Premier League	17	1	2	0	6	0	6	0	2 (Note: Appearances in the Senior Shield)	0	33	1
Kitchee	Total		41	2	5	0	35	3	19	0	2	0	102	5
Real Unión (loan)	2023	Primera Federación	5	1	0	0	0	0	0	0	0	0	5	1
Shanghai Shenhua	2024	Chinese Super League	11	1	3	2	0	0	10 (Note: Appearances in the AFC Champions League Elite)	1	0	0	24	4
Shanghai Shenhua	2025	Chinese Super League	28	4	2	0	1	0	7	0	0	0	38	4
Shanghai Shenhua	2026	Chinese Super League	0	0	0	0	0	0	0	0	0	0	0	0
Shanghai Shenhua	Total		39	5	5	2	1	0	17	1	0	0	62	8
Career total			90	8	10	2	36	3	36	1	2	0	174	14

=== International ===
As of 5 June 2026

National team	Year	Apps	Goals
Hong Kong	2019	1	0
Hong Kong	2020	0	0
Hong Kong	2021	3	0
Hong Kong	2022	0	0
Hong Kong	2023	6	1
Hong Kong	2024	12	0
Hong Kong	2025	12	0
Hong Kong	2026	2	0
Total		36	1

#	Date	Venue	Opponent	Result	Competition
2019
1	11 June 2019	Mong Kok Stadium, Mong Kok, Hong Kong	Chinese Taipei	0–2	Friendly
2021
2	3 June 2021	Al Muharraq Stadium, Arad, Bahrain	Iran	1–3	2022 FIFA World Cup qualification – AFC second round
3	11 June 2021	Al Muharraq Stadium, Arad, Bahrain	Iraq	0–1	2022 FIFA World Cup qualification – AFC second round
4	15 June 2021	Bahrain National Stadium, Riffa, Bahrain	Bahrain	0–4	2022 FIFA World Cup qualification – AFC second round
2023
5	7 September 2023	Phnom Penh Olympic Stadium, Phnom Penh, Cambodia	Cambodia	1–1	Friendly
6	11 September 2023	Hong Kong Stadium, So Kon Po, Hong Kong	Brunei	10–0	Friendly
7	12 October 2023	Hong Kong Stadium, So Kon Po, Hong Kong	Bhutan	4–0	2026 FIFA World Cup qualification – AFC first round
8	17 October 2023	Changlimithang Stadium, Thimphu, Bhutan	Bhutan	0–2	2026 FIFA World Cup qualification – AFC first round
9	16 November 2023	Azadi Stadium, Tehran, Iran	Iran	0–4	2026 FIFA World Cup qualification – AFC second round
10	21 November 2023	Changlimithang Stadium, Thimphu, Bhutan	Turkmenistan	2–2	2026 FIFA World Cup qualification – AFC second round
2024
11	1 January 2024	Baniyas Stadium, Abu Dhabi, United Arab Emirates	China	2–1	Friendly
12	14 January 2024	Khalifa International Stadium, Al Rayyan, Qatar	United Arab Emirates	1–3	2023 AFC Asian Cup
13	19 January 2024	Khalifa International Stadium, Al Rayyan, Qatar	Iran	0–1	2023 AFC Asian Cup
14	23 January 2024	Abdullah bin Khalifa Stadium, Doha, Qatar	Palestine	0–3	2023 AFC Asian Cup
15	6 June 2024	Hong Kong Stadium, So Kon Po, Hong Kong	Iran	2–4	2026 FIFA World Cup qualification – AFC second round
16	11 June 2024	Ashgabat Stadium, Ashgabat, Turkmenistan	Turkmenistan	0–0	2026 FIFA World Cup qualification – AFC second round
17	5 September 2024	HFC Bank Stadium, Suva, Fiji	Solomon Islands	3–0	Friendly
18	8 September 2024	Churchill Park, Lautoka, Fiji	Fiji	1–1	Friendly

=== International goals ===
No.	Date	Venue	Opponent	Score	Result	Competition
1.	12 October 2023	Hong Kong Stadium, So Kon Po, Hong Kong	Bhutan	3–0	4–0	2026 FIFA World Cup qualification – AFC first round

== Honours ==
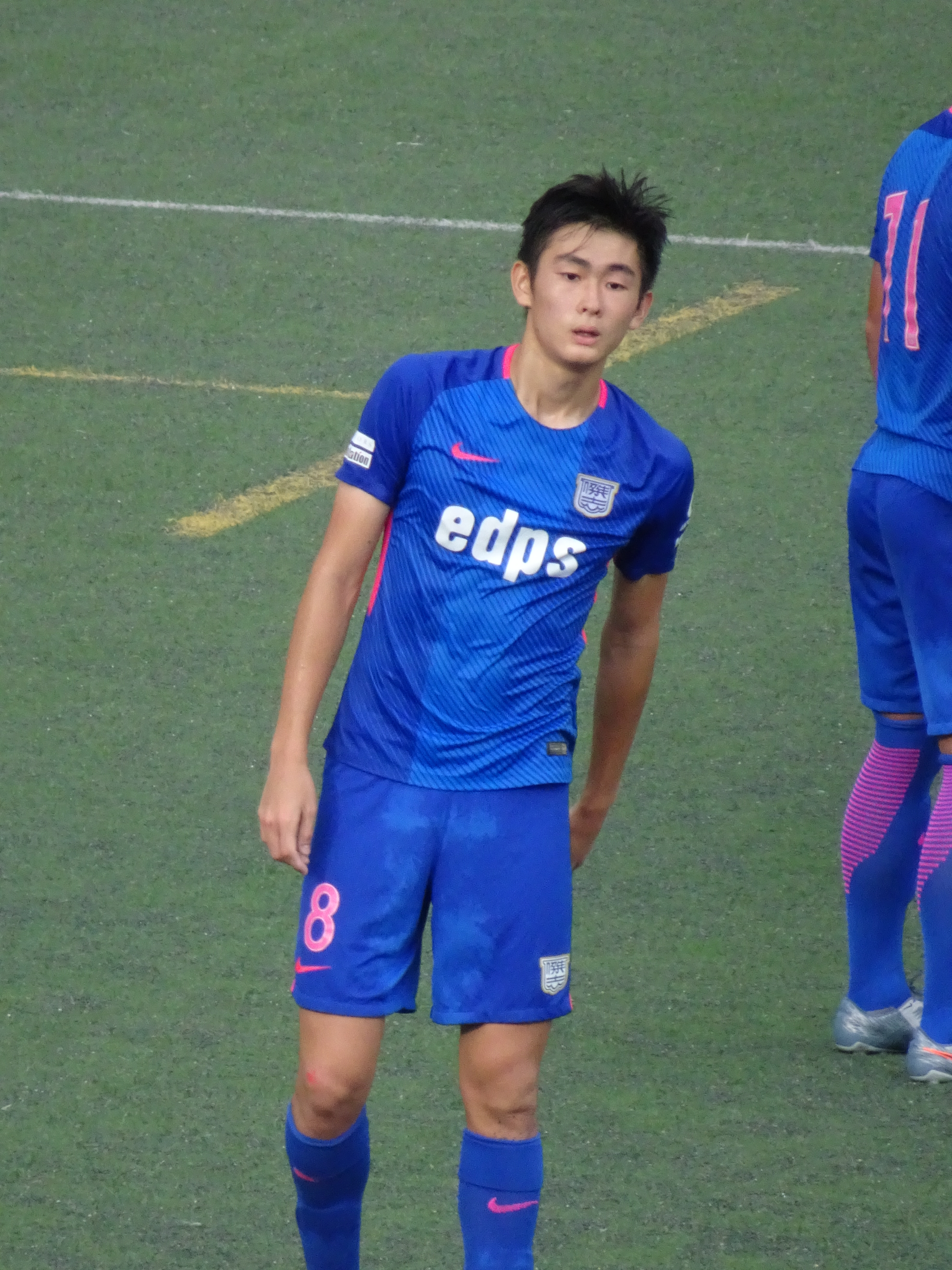
Chan with Kitchee in 2019

Kitchee

- Hong Kong Premier League: 2019–20, 2020–21, 2022–23
- Hong Kong Senior Shield: 2018–19, 2022–23, 2023–24
- Hong Kong FA Cup: 2018–19, 2022–23
- Hong Kong Sapling Cup: 2019–20

Shanghai Shenhua

- Chinese FA Super Cup: 2025
