= Leonid Slutsky (football manager) =

Russian football coach (born 1971)

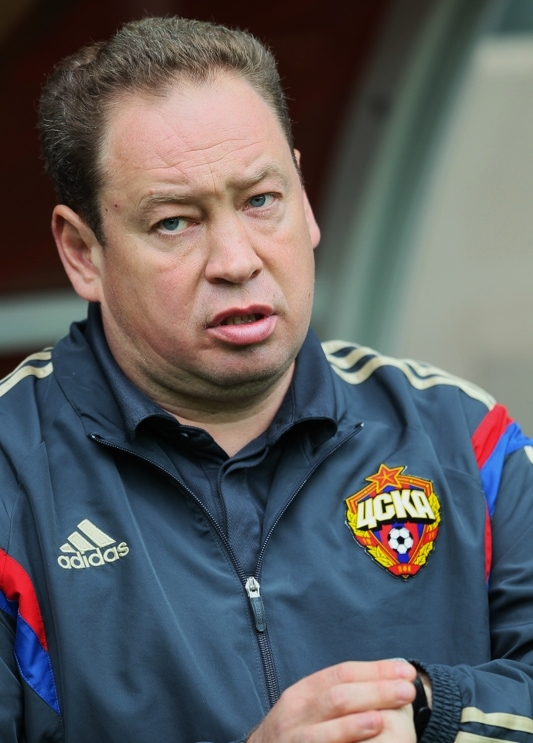
- Slutsky with CSKA Moscow in 2016

Personal information
- Full name: Leonid Viktorovich Slutsky
- Date of birth: 4 May 1971 (age 55)
- Place of birth: Volgograd, Russian SFSR, Soviet Union
- Height: 1.80 m (5 ft 11 in)
- Position: Goalkeeper

Senior career*
Years	Team	Apps	(Gls)
1989	Zvezda Gorodishche	13	(0)

Managerial career
- 1998–2000: Olimpia Volgograd
- 2003–2004: Uralan Elista
- 2005–2007: Moscow
- 2007–2009: Krylia Sovetov
- 2009–2016: CSKA Moscow
- 2015–2016: Russia
- 2017: Hull City
- 2018–2019: Vitesse
- 2019–2022: Rubin Kazan
- 2023–2026: Shanghai Shenhua
- * Club domestic league appearances and goals as of 3 August 2026

Leonid Viktorovich Slutsky (Russian: Леони́д Ви́кторович Слу́цкий [ˈsɫut͡skʲɪj]; born 4 May 1971) is a Russian professional football coach and a former player who was most recently the manager of Chinese Super League club Shanghai Shenhua. He has managed Olimpia Volgograd, Uralan Elista, Moscow, Krylia Sovetov, CSKA Moscow, Russia, Hull City, Vitesse and Rubin Kazan.

== Playing career ==
Slutsky saw his professional playing career ended aged 19, after he injured his knee falling from a tree while saving a cat.

== Managerial career ==
=== Early career ===
Slutsky became head coach of FC Moscow on 14 July 2005 until the end of the 2007 season. His final match as head coach of Moscow was a 3–1 win against Luch-Energiya Vladivostok on 11 November 2007. Slutsky became head coach of Krylia Sovetov on 1 January 2008.

=== CSKA Moscow ===
On 26 October 2009 he replaced Juande Ramos to become the head coach of CSKA Moscow. In December 2009, under Slutsky, CSKA reached the knock-out stage of the Champions League for the first time in the club's history, before being knocked out by José Mourinho's Inter Milan, the eventual champions, in the quarter-finals.

Two years later, the achievement was repeated, when CSKA defeated Inter Milan at the San Siro in the last game of the group stage.

Towards the 2012–13 season, Slutsky strengthened the team defense and re-organized the attack, which helped the team set a record of 15 games without being scored against, and to win all the games where the team scored first, resulting in a title.

On 7 August 2015, it was announced that Slutsky would take over the Russian national football team in place of the outgoing Fabio Capello. The contract was until the end of UEFA Euro 2016 qualifying. Slutsky won all of his qualifying games and got Russia into UEFA Euro 2016.

On 14 November 2015, Russia beat Portugal 1–0 in a friendly game and Slutsky repeated Pavel Sadyrin's achievement of winning his five first games as the head coach of Russia.

On 21 May 2016, CSKA beat Rubin Kazan 1–0 to secure the title ahead of surprise challengers Rostov. This gave Slutsky his third title in four years with the Moscow club.

On 20 June 2016, Slutsky decided to resign from being the coach of the Russian team after a 3–0 loss to Wales, which meant Russia finished bottom of their Euro 2016 group. He resigned on 25 June.

On 6 December 2016, Slutsky announced his resignation as CSKA manager. His last game was a Champions League group stage match against Tottenham Hotspur the following day.

=== Later career ===
On 9 June 2017, Slutsky was appointed manager of EFL Championship club Hull City. On 3 December 2017, he left the club by mutual consent after a run of bad results.

On 12 March 2018, it was announced that he would replace Henk Fraser as the new manager of Eredivisie side Vitesse Arnhem, for the start of the 2018–19 season. Under his tenure, Vitesse entered the draw for the third qualifying round of the Europa League, being drawn against seeded FC Basel. The two legs were played at home on 9 August and away on 16 August 2018. Vitesse lost 2–0 on aggregate, resulting in their elimination from the Europa League. At the domestic level, Vitesse finished fifth in the Eredivisie that season. After five lost games in a row, he decided to quit with his job as manager from Vitesse Arnhem at the end of November 2019.

On 19 December 2019, he signed a 5-year contract with Russian Premier League club FC Rubin Kazan. In his second season with Rubin, he led the club to 4th place in the 2020–21 Russian Premier League, securing UEFA competition qualification for the first time since the 2015–16 season. The next season was far worse, as on the last match day, Rubin lost 2–1 to FC Ufa and finished 15th which confirmed their relegation to the second tier. Slutsky resigned from Rubin on 15 November 2022, with the club in fourth place in the second-tier Russian First League and 4 points behind the first place.

On 27 December 2023, he was appointed manager of Chinese Super League club Shanghai Shenhua. He officially took charge of the club on 1 January 2024.During his tenure, he led the club to consecutive Chinese FA Super Cup titles in 2024 and 2025, as well as runner-up finishes in the Chinese Super League in both seasons. He managed Shanghai Shenhua in 109 matches across all competitions, recording 65 wins, 19 draws and 25 defeats. On 2 August 2026, following a run of three consecutive defeats, he resigned as manager.

== Managerial statistics ==
As of match played 2 August 2026

Managerial record by team and tenure
Team	Nat.	From	To	Record								Ref.
Team	Nat.	From	To	G	W	D	L	GF in	GA	GD	Win %	Ref.
Uralan Elista II	(Russia)	1 January 2000	23 February 2001	17	7	3	7	28	25	+3	41.18	
Uralan Elista	(Russia)	9 November 2003	16 June 2004	24	6	5	13	25	34	−9	25.00	
FC Moscow	(Russia)	14 July 2005	11 November 2007	95	44	26	25	132	109	+23	46.32	
Krylia Sovetov	(Russia)	1 January 2008	26 October 2009	59	22	18	19	76	66	+10	37.29	
CSKA Moscow	(Russia)	26 October 2009	7 December 2016	302	169	59	74	494	297	+197	55.96	
Russia	(Russia)	7 August 2015	20 June 2016	13	6	2	5	23	17	+6	46.15	
Hull City	(England)	9 June 2017	3 December 2017	21	4	7	10	34	39	−5	19.05	
Vitesse	(Netherlands)	12 March 2018	29 November 2019	62	27	15	20	114	90	+24	43.55	
Rubin Kazan	(Russia)	19 December 2019	13 November 2022	96	38	22	36	122	127	−5	39.58	
Shanghai Shenhua	(China)	30 December 2023	3 August 2026	109	65	19	25	232	141	+91	59.63	
Career Total				798	388	176	234	1,280	945	+335	48.62	

== TV commenting career ==
Slutsky has commented on football games many times on Russian TV. His commentating career was disrupted after he repeated the word "Navalny" following his co-commentator's using the term навальный футбол (navalny futbol); the term навальный (navalny) is a term best translated as "overwhelming" or "storming", but is also the surname of opposition politician Alexei Navalny. The incident led to his sacking from the TV pundit role at the 2018 FIFA World Cup.

== Honours ==
CSKA Moscow

- Russian Premier League: 2012–13, 2013–14, 2015–16
- Russian Cup: 2010–11, 2012–13
- Russian Super Cup: 2013, 2014

Shanghai Shenhua

- Chinese FA Super Cup: 2024, 2025
