= 2024 Chinese Super League =

21st season of the Chinese Super League

Chinese Super League
- Season: 2024
- Dates: 1 March – 2 November
- Champions: Shanghai Port
- Relegated: Nantong Zhiyun
- AFC Champions League Elite: Shanghai Port; Shanghai Shenhua; Chengdu Rongcheng
- AFC Champions League Two: Beijing Guoan
- Matches: 232
- Goals: 725 (3.13 per match)
- Top goalscorer: Wu Lei (34 goals)
- Biggest home win: Chengdu Rongcheng 7–0 Qingdao West Coast (26 May 2024); Shanghai Port 8–1 Nantong Zhiyun (26 July 2024); Beijing Guoan 8–1 Changchun Yatai (28 September 2024)
- Biggest away win: Shenzhen Peng City 0–6 Shanghai Port (5 May 2024)
- Highest scoring: Shanghai Port 8–1 Nantong Zhiyun (26 July 2024); Shanghai Port 7–2 Meizhou Hakka (9 August 2024); Beijing Guoan 8–1 Changchun Yatai (28 September 2024)
- Longest winning run: 16 matches Shanghai Port
- Longest unbeaten run: 23 matches Shanghai Port
- Longest winless run: 16 matches Cangzhou Mighty Lions
- Longest losing run: 6 matches Shenzhen Peng City
- Highest attendance: 54,189; Beijing Guoan 2–0 Shandong Taishan (30 June 2024)
- Lowest attendance: 0 Qingdao Hainiu 1–1 Beijing Guoan (21 May 2024); Qingdao Hainiu 3–1 Tianjin Jinmen Tiger (26 May 2024)
- Total attendance: 4,663,507
- Average attendance: 19,431

The 2024 Chinese Football Association Super League, also known as the 2024 China Resources C'estbon CFA Super League (Chinese: 2024华润怡宝中国足球协会超级联赛) for sponsorship reasons, was the 21st season since the establishment of the Chinese Super League. Shanghai Port were the defending champions.

== Clubs ==
=== Club changes ===
==== To Super League ====
**Clubs promoted from 2023 China League One**

- Sichuan Jiuniu
- Qingdao West Coast

==== From Super League ====
**Dissolved entries**

- ~~Dalian Pro~~
- ~~Shenzhen~~

==== Name changes ====
- Sichuan Jiuniu F.C. relocated to Shenzhen, Guangdong, and changed their name to Shenzhen Peng City between January and February 2024.

Shenzhen Peng City and Qingdao West Coast both compete in the Chinese Super League for the first time in their respective histories. Dalian Pro announced its dissolution on 17 January 2024 after a 6-year spell in the Chinese Super League after being relegated to the second-tier, putting an end to its 14-year lifespan as a football club. Shenzhen were dissolved five days later on 22 January after being relegated the previous season after a 5-year spell, ending its near-30-year lifespan.

=== Stadiums and locations ===
Locations of the 2024 Chinese Super League teams

Team	City	Stadium	Capacity	2023 season
Shanghai Port	Shanghai (Pudong)	Pudong Football Stadium	37,000	1st
Shandong Taishan	Jinan	Jinan Olympic Sports Center Stadium	56,808	2nd
Zhejiang	Hangzhou	Huanglong Sports Center	51,971	3rd
Chengdu Rongcheng	Chengdu	Phoenix Hill Football Stadium	50,695	4th
Shanghai Shenhua	Shanghai (Xuhui)	Shanghai Stadium	72,436	5th
Beijing Guoan	Beijing	Workers' Stadium	68,000	6th
Wuhan Three Towns	Wuhan	Wuhan Sports Center	56,201	7th
Tianjin Jinmen Tiger	Tianjin	TEDA Soccer Stadium	36,390	8th
Changchun Yatai	Changchun	Changchun Stadium	41,638	9th
Henan	Zhengzhou	Hanghai Stadium	29,860	10th
Meizhou Hakka	Wuhua	Wuhua County Olympic Sports Centre	27,000	11th
Cangzhou Mighty Lions	Cangzhou	Cangzhou Stadium	31,836	12th
Qingdao Hainiu	Qingdao (Chengyang)	Qingdao Youth Football Stadium	50,000	13th
Qingdao Hainiu	Qingdao (Chengyang)	Qingdao West Coast University City Sports Center (Note: Qingdao Hainiu played two home games at the Qingdao West Coast University City Sports Center on 15 September and 28 September to make way for a 2026 FIFA World Cup qualifier match which took place at Qingdao Hainiu's traditional home ground.)	27,000	13th
Nantong Zhiyun	Rugao	Rugao Olympic Sports Center	25,000	14th
Shenzhen Peng City ^{P}	Shenzhen	Bao'an Stadium	44,050	CL1, 1st
Qingdao West Coast ^{P}	Qingdao (Huangdao)	Qingdao West Coast University City Sports Center	27,000	CL1, 2nd

=== Personnel and kits ===
Team	Manager	Captain	Kit manufacturer	Shirt sponsor (chest)
Beijing Guoan	(Portugal) Ricardo Soares	(China) Yu Dabao	(United States) Nike (Note: All CSL teams use Nike as kit manufacturer.)	JD.com
Cangzhou Mighty Lions	(China) Li Xiaopeng	(China) Shao Puliang	(United States) Nike	Cangzhou Construction Investment; Ever Bright Group; Shijiazhuang Huirong Rural Cooperative Bank
Changchun Yatai	(China) Xie Hui	(Brazil) Serginho	(United States) Nike	Northeast Securities; Yatai Building Materials
Chengdu Rongcheng	(South Korea) Seo Jung-won	(Chinese Taipei) Tim Chow	(United States) Nike	Chengdu Rongcheng; Chengdu Construction
Henan	(South Korea) Nam Ki-il	(China) Wang Shangyuan	(United States) Nike	Zhengzhou Development Investment Group; Yujian Group
Meizhou Hakka	(Serbia) Milan Ristić	(China) Shi Liang	(United States) Nike	Guangdong Electric Power
Nantong Zhiyun	(Portugal) David Patrício	(China) Liu Wei	(United States) Nike	None
Qingdao Hainiu	(Bulgaria) Yasen Petrov	(China) Sha Yibo	(United States) Nike	Fight for Tsingtao
Qingdao West Coast	(China) Shao Jiayi	(China) Tian Yong	(United States) Nike	Xihai'an New Area
Shandong Taishan	(South Korea) Choi Kang-hee	(China) Zheng Zheng	(United States) Nike	Shandong Taishan
Shanghai Port	(Australia) Kevin Muscat	(Brazil) Oscar	(United States) Nike	Roewe
Shanghai Shenhua	(Russia) Leonid Slutsky	(China) Wu Xi	(United States) Nike	Bank of Communications
Shenzhen Peng City	(Italy) Christian Lattanzio	(China) Zhu Baojie	(United States) Nike	LOVE THIS CITY
Tianjin Jinmen Tiger	(China) Yu Genwei	(China) Wang Qiuming	(United States) Nike	HItech
Wuhan Three Towns	(Spain) Ricardo Rodríguez	(China) Liu Dianzuo	(United States) Nike	Huayuan Securities; Hubei Financial Leasing
Zhejiang	(Spain) Jordi Vinyals	(Croatia) Franko Andrijašević	(United States) Nike	Leapmotor

=== Managerial changes ===
Team	Outgoing manager	Manner of departure	Date of vacancy	Position in table	Incoming manager	Date of appointment
Qingdao West Coast	(Bulgaria) Zoran Janković (interim)	End of interim spell	24 November 2023	Pre-season	(Japan) Hisashi Kurosaki	2 January 2024
Qingdao Hainiu	(Spain) Antonio Gómez-Carreño Escalona	Sacked	22 December 2023	Pre-season	(Bulgaria) Yasen Petrov	25 December 2023
Shanghai Port	(Spain) Javier Pereira	End of contract	1 January 2024	Pre-season	(Australia) Kevin Muscat	1 January 2024
Shanghai Shenhua	(China) Wu Jingui	End of contract	1 January 2024	Pre-season	(Russia) Leonid Slutsky	1 January 2024
Meizhou Hakka	(Serbia) Milan Ristić	End of contract	3 January 2024	Pre-season	(Spain) Pablo Villar	6 January 2024
Wuhan Three Towns	(Japan) Tsutomu Takahata	Sacked	5 January 2024	Pre-season	(Spain) Ricardo Rodríguez	5 January 2024
Nantong Zhiyun	(Portugal) David Patrício (interim)	End of interim spell	5 January 2024	Pre-season	(Serbia) Mihajlo Jurasović	5 January 2024
Henan	(Spain) Sergio Zarco Díaz	Sacked	7 January 2024	Pre-season	(South Korea) Nam Ki-il	7 January 2024
Changchun Yatai	(China) Chen Yang	Resigned	17 April 2024	16th	(China) Xie Hui	17 April 2024
Meizhou Hakka	(Spain) Pablo Villar	Sacked	20 May 2024	15th	(China) Qu Gang (interim)	20 May 2024
Meizhou Hakka	(China) Qu Gang (interim)	End of interim spell	12 June 2024	12th	(Serbia) Milan Ristić	12 June 2024
Nantong Zhiyun	(Serbia) Mihajlo Jurasović	Sacked	24 June 2024	16th	(Portugal) David Patrício	24 June 2024
Cangzhou Mighty Lions	(China) Zhao Junzhe	Promoted to general manager (Note: Zhao swapped positions with Li Xiaopeng, who previously served as the team's general manager.)	16 July 2024	13th	(China) Li Xiaopeng	16 July 2024
Qingdao West Coast	(Japan) Hisashi Kurosaki	Resigned	29 July 2024	14th	(China) Shao Jiayi	29 July 2024

=== Foreign players ===
- Players name in **bold** indicates the player is registered during the mid-season transfer window.
- Players in italics were out of the squad or left the club within the season, after the pre-season transfer window, or in the mid-season transfer window, and at least had one appearance.

Team	Player 1	Player 2	Player 3	Player 4	Player 5	Naturalised players	Hong Kong/Macau/Taiwan players^{1}	Reserves players	Former players
Beijing Guoan	(Angola) Fábio Abreu	(Cameroon) Michael Ngadeu-Ngadjui	(Mali) Mamadou Traoré	(Nigeria) Samuel Adegbenro	(Portugal) Guga	(England) → (China) Nico Yennaris^{2} (Paraguay) → (China) Arturo Cheng			
Cangzhou Mighty Lions	(Brazil) Héber	(England) **Ayo Obileye**	(Kazakhstan) Georgy Zhukov	(Nigeria) Viv Solomon-Otabor			(Hong Kong) Sun Ming Him		(Democratic Republic of the Congo) Oscar Maritu (Zambia) Stoppila Sunzu
Changchun Yatai	(Austria) Peter Žulj	(Brazil) Serginho	(Serbia) Lazar Rosić	(Slovenia) Robert Berić	(Zambia) **Stoppila Sunzu**			(Brazil) Guilherme	
Chengdu Rongcheng	(Brazil) Felipe	(Brazil) Rômulo	(Colombia) **Manuel Palacios**	(Israel) Yahav Gurfinkel	(Netherlands) Timo Letschert	(Brazil) → (China) Elkeson^{2}	(Chinese Taipei) Tim Chow		(Brazil) Andrigo
Henan	(Brazil) Bruno Nazário	(Brazil) Iago Maidana	(Ghana) Frank Acheampong	(Serbia) Đorđe Denić	(Serbia) Nemanja Čović	(Russia) → (China) Li Tenglong^{2}			(Hong Kong) Oliver Gerbig
Meizhou Hakka	(Brazil) Rodrigo Henrique	(Cameroon) **John Mary**	(Croatia) Darick Kobie Morris	(Montenegro) Nebojša Kosović			(Hong Kong) Yue Tze Nam		(Cameroon) Rooney Eva Wankewai (Suriname) Tyrone Conraad
Nantong Zhiyun	(Brazil) **Farley Rosa**	(Croatia) David Puclin	(Mexico) Jesús Godínez	(Nigeria) Izuchukwu Anthony	(Sierra Leone) Issa Kallon	(Switzerland) → (China) Ming-yang Yang			(Democratic Republic of the Congo) Mayingila Nzuzi Mata (Serbia) **Stefan Veličković**
Qingdao Hainiu	(Bosnia and Herzegovina) Elvis Sarić	(Brazil) Diego Lopes	(Italy) Martin Boakye	(Serbia) **Nikola Radmanovac**	(Zambia) Evans Kangwa		(Chinese Taipei) Wang Chien-ming		(Brazil) **Wellington Silva** (Montenegro) Miloš Milović
Qingdao West Coast	(Angola) Nelson da Luz	(Armenia) Varazdat Haroyan	(Brazil) **Matheus Índio**	(Colombia) Brayan Riascos	(France) Jean-David Beauguel	(Brazil) → (China) Alan^{2}	(Chinese Taipei) Chen Po-liang		(Brazil) Eduardo Henrique
Shandong Taishan	(Brazil) Cryzan	(Brazil) **Marcel Scalese**	(Brazil) Zeca	(Georgia (country)) Valeri Qazaishvili		(Portugal) → (China) Pedro Delgado		(Brazil) Jadson (Brazil) Matheus Pato	(Brazil) → (China) Fernandinho
Shanghai Port	(Argentina) Matías Vargas	(Brazil) Gustavo	(Brazil) Léo Cittadini	(Brazil) Matheus Jussa	(Brazil) Oscar	(England) → (China) Tyias Browning^{2}	(Chinese Taipei) Will Donkin	(Brazil) **Willian Popp**	
Shanghai Shenhua	(Brazil) André Luis	(France) Ibrahim Amadou	(Portugal) João Carlos Teixeira	(Portugal) Wilson Manafá	(Switzerland) Cephas Malele	(Brazil) → (China) **Fernandinho^{2}**	(Hong Kong) **Shinichi Chan**		(Hong Kong) → (China) Dai Wai Tsun
Shenzhen Peng City	(Brazil) Thiago Andrade	(Brazil) **Tiago Leonço**	(Israel) **Eden Kartsev**	(Serbia) Rade Dugalić	(Spain) Edu García	(Hong Kong) → (China) **Dai Wai Tsun**^{2}	(Hong Kong) Matt Orr	(Spain) Jorge Ortiz (Sweden) Samuel Armenteros	
Tianjin Jinmen Tiger	(Albania) Albion Ademi	(Brazil) **Diogo Silva**	(Croatia) Mile Škorić	(Italy) Andrea Compagno	(Portugal) **Xadas**			(Australia) Alex Grant	(Croatia) Ivan Fiolić
Wuhan Three Towns	(Brazil) Darlan	(Guinea-Bissau) Romário Baldé	(Portugal) **Joca**	(South Korea) Park Ji-soo		(Italy) → (China) Denny Wang			(Brazil) Pedro Henrique (Colombia) Danilo Arboleda
Zhejiang	(Brazil) Leonardo	(Brazil) Lucas Possignolo	(Croatia) Franko Andrijašević	(Ivory Coast) Jean Evrard Kouassi	(Netherlands) Deabeas Owusu-Sekyere	(Gabon) → (China) Alexander N'Doumbou	(Hong Kong) Leung Nok Hang		

- **^1** For Hong Kong, Macau, or Taiwanese players, if they are non-naturalised and were registered as professional footballers in Hong Kong's, Macau's, or Chinese Taipei's football association for the first time, they are recognised as native players. Otherwise they are recognised as foreign players.
- **^2** Players who have already capped by a China senior or youth national team.

== League table ==
Pos	Team	Pld	W	D	L	GF	GA	GD	Pts	Qualification or relegation
1	Shanghai Port (C)	30	25	3	2	96	30	+66	78	Qualification for AFC Champions League Elite league stage
2	Shanghai Shenhua	30	24	5	1	73	20	+53	77	Qualification for AFC Champions League Elite league stage
3	Chengdu Rongcheng	30	18	5	7	65	31	+34	59	Qualification for AFC Champions League Elite play-off round
4	Beijing Guoan	30	16	8	6	65	35	+30	56	Qualification for AFC Champions League Two group stage
5	Shandong Taishan	30	13	9	8	49	40	+9	48	
6	Tianjin Jinmen Tiger	30	12	6	12	44	47	−3	42	
7	Zhejiang	30	11	5	14	55	60	−5	38	
8	Henan	30	9	9	12	34	39	−5	36	
9	Changchun Yatai	30	8	8	14	46	58	−12	32 (Note: Changchun Yatai are ahead of Qingdao West Coast on head-to-head points: Changchun Yatai 4, Qingdao West Coast 1)	
10	Qingdao West Coast	30	8	8	14	41	58	−17	32	
11	Wuhan Three Towns	30	8	7	15	31	44	−13	31	
12	Qingdao Hainiu	30	8	5	17	28	55	−27	29 (Note: Qingdao Hainiu are ahead of Cangzhou Mighty Lions and Shenzhen Peng City on head-to-head points: Qingdao Hainiu 12, Cangzhou Mighty Lions 2, Shenzhen Peng City 2 and Cangzhou Mighty Lions are ahead of Shenzhen Peng City on head-to-head goal difference: Cangzhou Mighty Lions -2, Shenzhen Peng City -3)	
13	Cangzhou Mighty Lions	30	7	8	15	33	57	−24	29	Dissolved at end of season
14	Shenzhen Peng City	30	7	8	15	29	55	−26	29	
15	Meizhou Hakka	30	6	9	15	29	55	−26	27	
16	Nantong Zhiyun (R)	30	5	7	18	32	66	−34	22	Relegation to China League One

Source: Soccerway
Rules for classification:
- During season: 1) Points; 2) Head-to-head points; 3) Head-to-head goal difference; 4) Head-to-head goals scored; 5) Goal difference; 6) Goals scored; 7) Rankings in the previous season. (Rules 2 to 4 are only applied when teams concerned have finished both/all the matches against others.)
- After season: 1) Points; 2) Head-to-head points; 3) Head-to-head goal difference; 4) Head-to-head goals scored; 5) Goal difference; 6) Goals scored; 7) Disciplinary points (yellow card = 1 point, red card = 3 points); 8) Drawing of lots.
  (C) Champions; (R) Relegated
  Notes:

== Results ==
Home \ Away	BJG	CML	CCY	CDR	HEN	MZH	NTZ	QDH	QWC	SDT	SHP	SHS	SPC	TJT	WTT	ZHJ
Beijing Guoan	—	4–0	8–1	2–1	1–1	3–2	5–2	6–0	4–1	2–0	2–2	2–1	1–2	2–0	1–2	0–0
Cangzhou Mighty Lions	0–2	—	2–0	1–0	2–3	2–1	0–0	0–1	3–2	3–1	0–1	0–5	1–1	2–4	1–1	0–1
Changchun Yatai	3–2	1–0	—	1–2	0–0	0–1	3–2	5–0	4–0	2–2	3–4	1–2	1–1	0–1	2–0	2–2
Chengdu Rongcheng	2–2	4–0	4–0	—	4–2	2–0	1–0	2–0	7–0	0–1	3–1	1–2	3–1	2–1	2–2	3–0
Henan	2–1	0–2	0–0	2–0	—	2–2	1–1	1–0	1–0	1–0	0–1	1–2	0–2	1–2	2–3	2–1
Meizhou Hakka	1–3	1–1	2–1	1–4	0–3	—	2–1	0–0	1–1	0–0	1–2	0–2	0–0	3–2	1–0	1–2
Nantong Zhiyun	1–3	1–1	2–3	0–1	1–1	1–0	—	2–1	0–3	0–2	0–3	0–2	0–1	1–1	1–3	3–2
Qingdao Hainiu	1–1	1–0	0–1	1–5	0–2	4–2	2–2	—	3–1	0–1	0–5	0–1	1–0	3–1	1–1	2–0
Qingdao West Coast	2–2	1–1	2–2	1–1	1–1	3–3	0–2	1–0	—	0–0	3–5	0–1	3–2	1–3	0–1	5–2
Shandong Taishan	0–0	4–1	4–2	3–0	2–2	2–1	3–1	1–1	0–1	—	0–1	0–3	3–2	4–1	0–0	3–0
Shanghai Port	5–1	4–1	5–2	2–0	3–1	7–2	8–1	5–0	2–1	4–3	—	1–1	2–0	5–0	3–1	3–1
Shanghai Shenhua	1–1	4–0	3–2	1–1	2–1	3–0	5–1	2–0	2–0	6–0	3–1	—	2–2	2–1	4–1	4–0
Shenzhen Peng City	1–0	2–2	2–1	0–3	0–0	0–0	2–1	1–3	1–2	1–4	0–6	0–1	—	0–4	1–1	3–2
Tianjin Jinmen Tiger	0–1	3–2	2–2	2–3	1–0	0–0	1–1	1–0	2–1	1–1	0–3	0–0	3–0	—	1–0	3–2
Wuhan Three Towns	0–1	2–3	0–0	1–1	1–0	0–1	1–2	1–0	1–3	1–2	0–2	0–2	4–1	2–1	—	0–2
Zhejiang	1–2	2–2	3–1	1–3	4–1	4–0	5–2	4–3	1–2	3–3	0–0	3–4	1–0	3–2	3–1	—

Source: Soccerway
Legend: Blue = home team win; Yellow = draw; Red = away team win.
For upcoming matches, an "a" indicates there is an article about the rivalry between the two participants.

== Positions by round ==
To preserve chronological evolvements, any postponed matches are not included to the round at which they were originally scheduled, but added to the full round they were played immediately afterwards. For example, if a match is scheduled for round 7, but then played between rounds 8 and 9, it will be added to the standings for round 8.

Team ╲ Round	1	2	3	4	5	6	7	8	9	10	11	12	13	14	15	16	17	18	19	20	21	22	23	24	25	26	27	28	29	30
Shanghai Port	2	4	3	3	3	3	3	3	3	2	2	2	2	2	1	1	1	1	1	1	1	1	1	1	1	1	1	2	1	1
Shanghai Shenhua	4	1	1	1	1	1	1	1	1	1	1	1	1	1	2	2	2	2	2	2	2	2	2	2	2	2	2	1	2	2
Chengdu Rongcheng	3	7	6	2	2	2	2	2	2	4	4	3	3	3	3	3	3	3	3	3	3	3	3	3	3	3	3	3	3	3
Beijing Guoan	5	5	4	4	6	6	5	4	4	3	3	4	4	4	5	4	4	4	4	4	4	4	4	4	4	4	4	4	4	4
Shandong Taishan	1	3	7	8	7	7	7	5	5	5	5	5	5	5	4	5	5	5	5	5	5	5	5	5	5	5	5	5	5	5
Tianjin Jinmen Tiger	7	2	2	5	4	5	6	7	8	6	7	7	7	7	7	7	7	7	7	7	7	8	8	6	6	6	6	6	6	6
Zhejiang	6	6	5	6	10	10	8	9	6	8	6	6	6	6	6	6	6	6	6	6	6	6	6	7	7	8	8	7	7	7
Henan	8	11	12	14	12	13	10	8	9	10	11	12	12	14	11	9	8	9	9	8	8	7	7	8	8	7	7	8	8	8
Changchun Yatai	12	9	11	13	14	16	15	16	16	14	16	11	11	10	13	13	10	10	11	12	12	12	11	13	10	12	12	10	9	9
Qingdao West Coast	10	14	9	9	9	9	11	14	13	11	10	10	10	11	15	15	16	16	15	14	14	15	15	15	13	10	11	12	12	10
Wuhan Three Towns	13	8	10	12	13	14	12	10	10	9	9	8	8	8	8	8	9	8	8	9	10	9	9	9	11	9	9	9	10	11
Qingdao Hainiu	16	15	16	16	16	12	14	13	15	16	15	16	16	13	9	11	12	11	10	11	11	11	12	10	12	13	13	13	14	12
Cangzhou Mighty Lions	15	10	8	7	5	4	4	6	7	7	8	9	9	9	10	12	13	13	13	15	15	14	13	12	9	11	10	11	11	13
Shenzhen Peng City	11	16	15	11	8	8	9	12	11	12	13	14	14	16	14	10	11	12	12	10	9	10	10	11	14	14	14	14	15	14
Meizhou Hakka	14	12	13	15	15	15	16	15	14	13	14	15	15	12	12	14	15	15	14	13	13	13	14	14	15	15	15	15	13	15
Nantong Zhiyun	9	13	14	10	11	11	13	11	12	15	12	13	13	15	16	16	14	14	16	16	16	16	16	16	16	16	16	16	16	16

Leader and qualification for AFC Champions League Elite group stage
Qualification for AFC Champions League Elite play-off round
Qualification for AFC Champions League Two group stage
Relegation to China League One

Source: Soccerway

== Results by match played ==
Team ╲ Round	1	2	3	4	5	6	7	8	9	10	11	12	13	14	15	16	17	18	19	20	21	22	23	24	25	26	27	28	29	30
Beijing Guoan	W	D	W	D	L	D	W	W	W	W	W	L	D	W	L	W	W	L	L	W	L	W	D	D	D	W	W	W	W	D
Cangzhou Mighty Lions	L	W	D	W	W	W	L	L	L	D	L	L	D	L	L	L	L	D	D	L	L	D	W	W	W	D	L	D	L	L
Changchun Yatai	L	W	L	L	L	L	D	L	D	W	L	W	D	D	L	D	W	D	L	L	W	L	W	L	W	L	L	W	D	D
Chengdu Rongcheng	W	L	W	W	W	W	W	L	D	L	W	W	L	W	D	W	W	W	W	D	W	W	W	L	D	L	W	W	D	L
Henan	D	D	L	L	D	D	W	W	L	L	L	L	L	D	W	W	W	L	D	W	W	D	W	L	L	W	L	L	D	D
Meizhou Hakka	L	D	L	L	D	D	L	W	D	D	L	L	D	W	D	L	L	L	W	D	L	W	L	W	L	L	L	D	W	L
Nantong Zhiyun	D	L	L	W	L	D	L	W	L	L	D	L	D	L	L	D	W	L	L	L	L	D	L	L	L	W	W	D	L	L
Qingdao Hainiu	L	L	L	L	D	W	L	W	L	L	D	L	D	W	W	L	L	W	D	L	W	L	L	W	D	L	L	L	L	W
Qingdao West Coast	D	L	W	W	W	L	L	L	D	D	W	L	D	L	L	L	L	L	W	D	L	D	D	W	W	W	L	L	D	W
Shandong Taishan	W	D	L	W	D	L	W	W	W	D	W	W	D	W	D	D	L	L	D	W	L	L	L	W	L	D	W	W	D	W
Shanghai Port	W	D	W	D	W	W	W	D	W	W	W	W	W	W	W	W	W	W	W	W	W	W	W	L	W	W	W	L	W	W
Shanghai Shenhua	W	W	W	W	W	D	W	D	W	W	D	W	W	W	D	W	W	W	W	W	W	L	W	W	W	W	W	W	D	W
Shenzhen Peng City	L	L	D	W	W	D	L	L	D	L	L	L	D	L	W	W	L	D	D	W	W	L	L	L	L	L	L	D	D	W
Tianjin Jinmen Tiger	D	W	W	L	L	D	L	L	L	W	D	W	D	L	L	D	W	D	L	L	W	L	W	W	W	L	W	L	W	L
Wuhan Three Towns	L	W	L	L	L	D	D	W	D	W	L	W	L	L	W	L	L	W	D	D	L	W	L	L	D	D	W	L	L	L
Zhejiang	W	D	W	L	L	L	W	L	W	L	W	W	W	L	W	L	L	W	L	L	L	W	L	D	L	D	L	W	D	D

Source: Soccerway
W = Win; D = Draw; L = Loss

== Statistics ==
=== Top scorers ===
As of 2 November 2024

Rank	Player	Club	Goals
1	(China) Wu Lei	Shanghai Port	34
2	(Brazil) Leonardo	Zhejiang	21
3	(Brazil) Gustavo	Shanghai Port	20
4	(Brazil) André Luis	Shanghai Shenhua	17
4	(Italy) Andrea Compagno	Tianjin Jinmen Tiger	17
6	(Switzerland) Cephas Malele	Shanghai Shenhua	16
7	(Brazil) Felipe	Chengdu Rongcheng	15
8	(Angola) Fábio Abreu	Beijing Guoan	14
8	(Brazil) Oscar	Shanghai Port	14
10	(Slovenia) Robert Berić	Changchun Yatai	13

==== Hat-tricks ====
Player	Club	Against	Result	Date
(Brazil) Felipe	Chengdu Rongcheng	Shenzhen Peng City	3–1 (H)	20 April 2024
(Brazil) Cryzan	Shandong Taishan	Nantong Zhiyun	3–1 (H)	30 April 2024
(Argentina) Matías Vargas	Shanghai Port	Shenzhen Peng City	6–0 (A)	5 May 2024
(Italy) Andrea Compagno	Tianjin Jinmen Tiger	Cangzhou Mighty Lions	4–2 (A)	17 May 2024
(Brazil) Oscar	Shanghai Port	Cangzhou Mighty Lions	4–1 (H)	26 May 2024

Notes

- (H) – Home team
- (A) – Away team

=== Discipline ===
As of 6 April 2024

==== Player ====
- Most yellow cards: 4
  - (China) Zhao Honglüe (Qingdao West Coast)
- Most red cards: 1
  - 6 players

==== Club ====
- Most yellow cards: 11
  - Zhejiang
  - Qingdao West Coast
- Fewest yellow cards: 2
  - Wuhan Three Towns
  - Meizhou Hakka
- Most red cards: 2
  - Zhejiang
  - Henan
- Fewest red cards: 0
  - 12 teams

== Awards ==
=== Player of the Round ===
Player of the Round
Round	Player	Club	Ref.
1	(China) Wu Lei	Shanghai Port	
2	(China) Wang Dalei	Shandong Taishan	
3	(Portugal) João Carlos Teixeira	Shanghai Shenhua	
4	(China) Wu Lei (2)	Shanghai Port	
5	(Albania) Albion Ademi	Tianjin Jinmen Tiger	
6	(China) Wu Lei (3)	Shanghai Port	
7	(Brazil) Felipe	Chengdu Rongcheng	
8	(Mexico) Jesús Godínez	Nantong Zhiyun	
9	(Brazil) Cryzan	Shandong Taishan	
10	(Argentina) Matías Vargas	Shanghai Port	
11	(China) Wu Lei (4)	Shanghai Port	
12	(Italy) Andrea Compagno	Tianjin Jinmen Tiger	
13	(Netherlands) Deabeas Owusu-Sekyere	Zhejiang	
14	(Brazil) Oscar	Shanghai Port	
15	(Brazil) Bruno Nazário	Henan	
16	(Switzerland) Cephas Malele	Shanghai Shenhua	
17	(China) Wu Lei (5)	Shanghai Port	
18	(Switzerland) Cephas Malele (2)	Shanghai Shenhua	
19	(China) Wu Lei (6)	Shanghai Port	
20	(Brazil) Felipe (2)	Chengdu Rongcheng	
21	(Colombia) Manuel Palacios	Chengdu Rongcheng	
22	(China) Wu Lei (7)	Shanghai Port	
23	(Brazil) André Luis (China) Wang Dalei (2)	Shanghai Shenhua; Shandong Taishan	
24	(Brazil) Cryzan (2)	Shandong Taishan	
25	(China) Wu Xi	Shanghai Shenhua	
26	(China) Yu Hanchao	Shanghai Shenhua	
27	(Angola) Fábio Abreu	Beijing Guoan	
28	(China) Jian Tao	Chengdu Rongcheng	
29	(Portugal) Xadas	Tianjin Jinmen Tiger	
30	(China) Wu Lei (8)	Shanghai Port	

=== Monthly awards ===
Month	Player of the Month		Coach of the Month		Goalkeeper of the Month	
Month	Player	Club	Manager	Club	Player	Club
March	(China) Wu Lei	Shanghai Port	(Russia) Leonid Slutsky	Shanghai Shenhua	(China) Zhao Bo	Zhejiang
April	(China) Wu Lei	Shanghai Port	(Russia) Leonid Slutsky	Shanghai Shenhua	(China) Hou Sen	Beijing Guoan
May	(China) Wu Lei	Shanghai Port	(Australia) Kevin Muscat	Shanghai Port	(China) Bao Yaxiong	Shanghai Shenhua
June	(China) Wu Lei	Shanghai Port	(Australia) Kevin Muscat	Shanghai Port	(China) Bao Yaxiong	Shanghai Shenhua
July	(China) Wu Lei	Shanghai Port	(Australia) Kevin Muscat	Shanghai Port	(China) Wang Guoming	Henan
August	(China) Wu Lei	Shanghai Port	(China) Li Xiaopeng	Cangzhou Mighty Lions	(China) Wang Dalei	Shandong Taishan
September	(China) Yu Hanchao	Shanghai Shenhua	(Russia) Leonid Slutsky	Shanghai Shenhua	(China) Shi Xiaotian	Qingdao West Coast

Team of the Month
Month	Goalkeeper	Defenders	Midfielders	Forwards
March	(China) Zhao Bo (Zhejiang)	(China) Jiang Shenglong (Shanghai Shenhua) (Cameroon) Michael Ngadeu-Ngadjui (Beijing Guoan) (Portugal) Wilson Manafá (Shanghai Shenhua)	(Brazil) Oscar (Shanghai Port) (Portugal) João Carlos Teixeira (Shanghai Shenhua) (Albania) Albion Ademi (Tianjin Jinmen Tiger) (Chinese Taipei) Tim Chow (Chengdu Rongcheng) (France) Ibrahim Amadou (Shanghai Shenhua)	(Brazil) André Luis (Shanghai Shenhua) (China) Wu Lei (Shanghai Port)
April	(China) Hou Sen (Beijing Guoan)	(China) Jiang Zhipeng (Wuhan Three Towns) (China) Zhu Chenjie (Shanghai Shenhua) (Cameroon) Michael Ngadeu-Ngadjui (Beijing Guoan)	(Georgia (country)) Valeri Qazaishvili (Shandong Taishan) (Brazil) Oscar (Shanghai Port) (Portugal) João Carlos Teixeira (Shanghai Shenhua) (Albania) Albion Ademi (Tianjin Jinmen Tiger)	(China) Wu Lei (Shanghai Port) (Brazil) Felipe (Chengdu Rongcheng) (Brazil) André Luis (Shanghai Shenhua)
May	(China) Bao Yaxiong (Shanghai Shenhua)	(China) Jiang Shenglong (Shanghai Shenhua) (China) Zhu Chenjie (Shanghai Shenhua) (Mali) Mamadou Traoré (Beijing Guoan) (Chinese Taipei) Wang Chien-ming (Qingdao Hainiu)	(Argentina) Matías Vargas (Shanghai Port) (Brazil) Oscar (Shanghai Port) (Netherlands) Deabeas Owusu-Sekyere (Zhejiang)	(China) Wei Shihao (Chengdu Rongcheng) (Italy) Andrea Compagno (Tianjin Jinmen Tiger) (China) Wu Lei (Shanghai Port)
June	(China) Bao Yaxiong (Shanghai Shenhua)	(Nigeria) Izuchukwu Anthony (Nantong Zhiyun) (China) Tyias Browning (Shanghai Port) (China) Zhu Chenjie (Shanghai Shenhua)	(Argentina) Matías Vargas (Shanghai Port) (Brazil) Oscar (Shanghai Port) (Brazil) Rômulo (Chengdu Rongcheng) (Brazil) Serginho (Changchun Yatai)	(China) Wu Lei (Shanghai Port) (Brazil) Leonardo (Zhejiang) (Switzerland) Cephas Malele (Shanghai Shenhua)
July	(China) Wang Guoming (Henan)	(Serbia) Rade Dugalić (Shenzhen Peng City) (China) Tyias Browning (Shanghai Port) (Portugal) Wilson Manafá (Shanghai Shenhua)	(China) Wu Lei (Shanghai Port) (Argentina) Matías Vargas (Shanghai Port) (Brazil) Oscar (Shanghai Port) (Albania) Albion Ademi (Tianjin Jinmen Tiger)	(Switzerland) Cephas Malele (Shanghai Shenhua) (Brazil) Gustavo (Shanghai Port) (China) Alan (Qingdao West Coast)
August	(China) Wang Dalei (Shandong Taishan)	(Netherlands) Timo Letschert (Chengdu Rongcheng) (Cameroon) Michael Ngadeu-Ngadjui (Beijing Guoan) (China) Zhu Chenjie (Shanghai Shenhua)	(China) Wu Lei (Shanghai Port) (Colombia) Manuel Palacios (Chengdu Rongcheng) (Portugal) Joca (Wuhan Three Towns) (Brazil) Oscar (Shanghai Port)	(Brazil) André Luis (Shanghai Shenhua) (Italy) Martin Boakye (Qingdao Hainiu) (Italy) Andrea Compagno (Tianjin Jinmen Tiger)
September	(China) Shi Xiaotian (Qingdao West Coast)	(China) Li Lei (Beijing Guoan) (Netherlands) Timo Letschert (Chengdu Rongcheng) (Brazil) Iago Maidana (Henan) (China) Ren Hang (Wuhan Three Towns)	(Brazil) Oscar (Shanghai Port) (China) Wang Qiuming (Tianjin Jinmen Tiger) (China) Yu Hanchao (Shanghai Shenhua)	(Brazil) Leonardo (Zhejiang) (Angola) Fábio Abreu (Beijing Guoan) (Brazil) André Luis (Shanghai Shenhua)

== League attendances ==
Pos	Team	Total	High	Low	Average	Change
1	Beijing Guoan	696,659	54,189	35,343	46,444	+6.1%
2	Chengdu Rongcheng	597,274	40,536	34,881	39,818	+13.8%
3	Shanghai Shenhua	457,495	39,928	24,182	30,500	+15.9%
4	Shandong Taishan	397,544	48,397	8,836	26,503	−4.4%
5	Tianjin Jinmen Tiger	369,500	28,550	20,083	24,633	−19.0%
6	Shanghai Port	301,537	26,373	12,457	20,102	+29.1%
7	Zhejiang	297,077	32,087	8,956	19,805	+145.9%
8	Qingdao Hainiu	252,835	30,988	0	16,856	−6.1%
9	Henan	237,731	19,628	12,323	15,849	−2.4%
10	Nantong Zhiyun	216,212	20,998	5,569	14,414	−6.6%
11	Changchun Yatai	204,175	18,295	9,091	13,612	−14.2%
12	Meizhou Hakka	152,763	16,328	7,325	10,184	−32.1%
13	Cangzhou Mighty Lions	133,535	11,518	7,569	8,902	+2.4%
14	Wuhan Three Towns	127,830	18,071	5,016	8,522	−46.3%
15	Qingdao West Coast	122,137	15,166	5,122	8,142	+47.6%^{†}
16	Shenzhen Peng City	99,203	11,220	3,273	6,614	+130.2%^{†}
	League total	4,663,507	54,189	0	19,431	−2.2%

Notes:
^{†} Teams played previous season in CL1.
