= Xu Jiamin =

Chinese footballer

Xu Jiamin 徐嘉敏
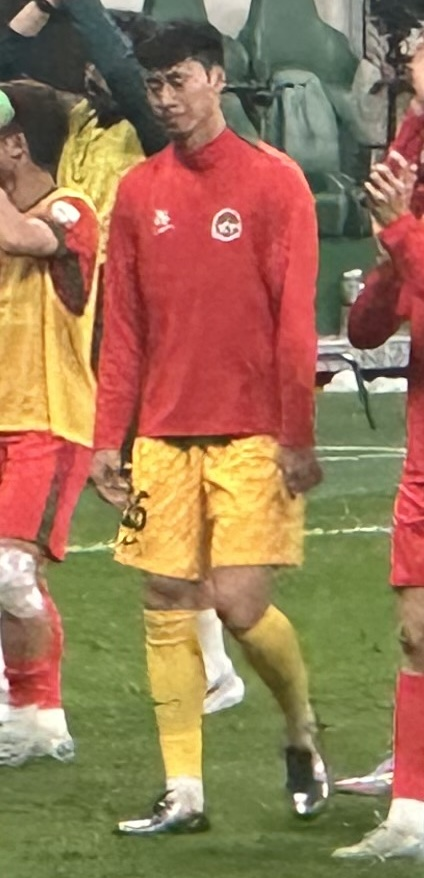
- Xu Jiamin in April 2025

Personal information
- Full name: Xu Jiamin
- Date of birth: 11 April 1994 (age 32)
- Place of birth: Shanghai, China
- Height: 1.93 m (6 ft 4 in)
- Position: Goalkeeper

Team information
- Current team: Henan FC
- Number: 26

Senior career*
Years	Team	Apps	(Gls)
2011	Shanghai Zobon		
2012–2020	Beijing Renhe	3	(0)
2019	→ Heilongjiang Lava Spring (loan)	26	(0)
2020–2021	Dalian Pro	6	(0)
2022–2023	Tianjin Jinmen Tiger	39	(0)
2024–	Henan FC	14	(0)
- * Club domestic league appearances and goals as of 28 August 2025

Xu Jiamin (Chinese: 徐嘉敏; born 11 April 1994) is a Chinese footballer who currently plays as a goalkeeper for Chinese Super League side Henan FC.

== Club career ==
Xu Jiamin started his professional football career in 2011 when he was part of the Shanghai Zobon's squad for the 2011 China League Two campaign. He joined Chinese Super League side Guizhou Renhe (later renamed Beijing Renhe) on 23 May 2012. He would be used as reserve goalkeeper and eventually go on to make his debut in a Chinese FA Cup game on 7 July 2015 against Jiangxi Liansheng that ended in a 3-2 victory. This would be followed by his Chinese Super League debut on 11 November 2018, in a 0–0 home draw against Guangzhou R&F.

On 28 February 2019, Xu was loaned to China League One side Heilongjiang FC for the 2019 season. He would make his debut on 10 March 2019 in a league game against Shaanxi Chang'an Athletic F.C. in a 1-0 victory. Throughout the season he would establish himself as the club's first choice goalkeeper by making 26 league appearances. On 9 July 2020, Xu signed with top tier club Dalian Pro. He would make his debut for the club in a league game on 27 September 2020 against Guangzhou Evergrande in a 1-0 defeat.

On 28 April 2022, Xu signed with top tier club Tianjin Jinmen Tiger for the start of the 2022 Chinese Super League campaign. He would make his debut for the club in a league game on 13 June 2022 against Beijing Guoan in a 1-0 defeat.

== Career statistics ==
As of match played 31 December 2025.

Appearances and goals by club, season and competition
Club	Season	League			National Cup		Continental		Other		Total	
Club	Season	Division	Apps	Goals	Apps	Goals	Apps	Goals	Apps	Goals	Apps	Goals
Shanghai Zobon	2011	China League Two			-		-		-			
Guizhou Renhe/ Beijing Renhe	2012	Chinese Super League	0	0	0	0	-		-		0	0
Guizhou Renhe/ Beijing Renhe	2013	Chinese Super League	0	0	0	0	0	0	-		0	0
Guizhou Renhe/ Beijing Renhe	2014	Chinese Super League	0	0	0	0	0	0	0 (Note: Appearance(s) in Chinese FA Super Cup)	0	0	0
Guizhou Renhe/ Beijing Renhe	2015	Chinese Super League	0	0	1	0	-		-		1	0
Guizhou Renhe/ Beijing Renhe	2016	China League One	0	0	2	0	-		-		2	0
Guizhou Renhe/ Beijing Renhe	2017	China League One	2	0	2	0	-		-		4	0
Guizhou Renhe/ Beijing Renhe	2018	Chinese Super League	1	0	1	0	-		-		2	0
Guizhou Renhe/ Beijing Renhe	Total		3	0	6	0	0	0	0	0	9	0
Heilongjiang FC (loan)	2019	China League One	26	0	1	0	-		-		27	0
Dalian Pro	2020	Chinese Super League	3	0	1	0	-		-		4	0
Dalian Pro	2021	Chinese Super League	3	0	2	0	-		0 (Note: Appearance(s) in Promotion/Relegation play-offs)	0	5	0
Dalian Pro	Total		6	0	3	0	0	0	0	0	9	0
Tianjin Jinmen Tiger	2022	Chinese Super League	20	0	0	0	-		-		20	0
Tianjin Jinmen Tiger	2023	Chinese Super League	19	0	0	0	-		-		19	0
Tianjin Jinmen Tiger	Total		39	0	0	0	0	0	0	0	39	0
Henan FC	2024	Chinese Super League	11	0	0	0	-		-		11	0
Henan FC	2025	Chinese Super League	3	0	3	0	-		-		6	0
Henan FC	Total		14	0	3	0	0	0	0	0	17	0
Career total			88	0	13	0	0	0	0	0	101	0
