= Leonardo (footballer, born 1997) =

Brazilian footballer (born 1997)

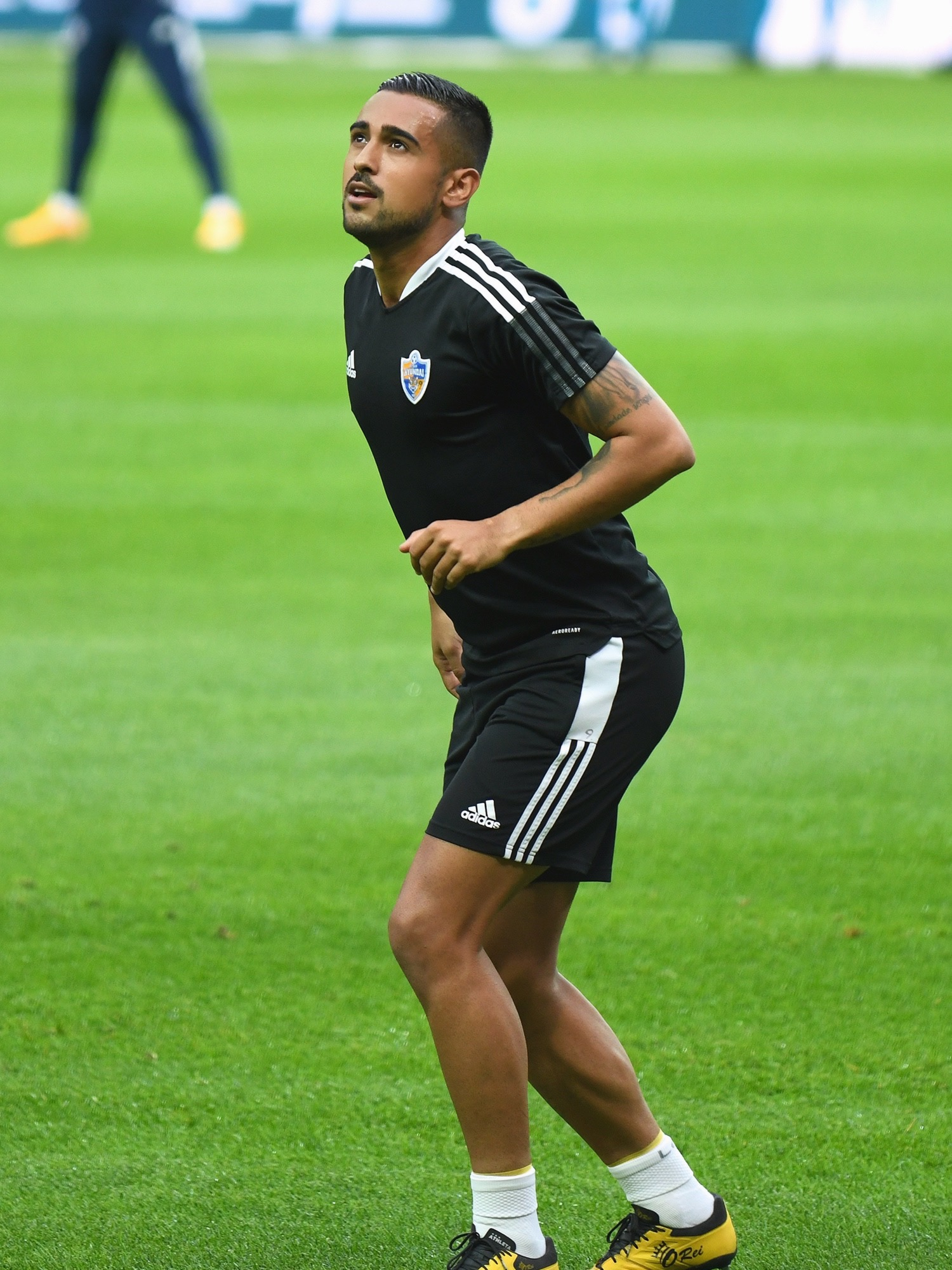
- Leonardo with Ulsan Hyundai, June 2022

Personal information
- Full name: Leonardo Nascimento Lopes de Souza
- Date of birth: 28 May 1997 (age 29)
- Place of birth: Sorocaba, Brazil
- Height: 1.80 m (5 ft 11 in)
- Position: Forward

Team information
- Current team: Shanghai Port
- Number: 45

Youth career
- 2010–2012: Red Bull Brasil
- 2012–2014: Corinthians
- 2015–2016: Ituano

Senior career*
Years	Team	Apps	(Gls)
2015–2016	Ituano	0	(0)
2017	Santos	0	(0)
2017	→ Rio Verde (loan)	3	(0)
2018	Gainare Tottori	31	(24)
2019	Albirex Niigata	38	(28)
2020	Urawa Red Diamonds	28	(11)
2021–2024	Shandong Taishan	8	(1)
2021	→ Hebei FC (loan)	12	(1)
2022	→ Ulsan Hyundai (loan)	34	(11)
2023	→ Changchun Yatai (loan)	12	(10)
2023	→ Zhejiang FC (loan)	16	(9)
2024	→ Zhejiang FC (loan)	29	(21)
2025–	Shanghai Port	56	(35)
- * Club domestic league appearances and goals as of 8 November 2026

Leonardo Nascimento Lopes de Souza (born 28 May 1997), known as Leonardo, is a Brazilian professional footballer who plays as a forward for Chinese Super League club Shanghai Port.

== Career ==
Leonardo grew in the Santos youth ranks and then he was loaned to the B-team, where he scored three goals in 16 games. Gainare Tottori wanted to scout him, so GM Masayuki Okano and returning Fernandinho went to Brazil to see with their own eyes the striker and another player, Vitor Gabriel. In January 2018, the Tottori-based club signed both class '97 for their incoming 2018 season.

After a top-scorer season with Albirex Niigata, scoring 28 goals in the 2019 J2 League, the Brazilian striker signed for Urawa Red Diamonds in the J1 League.

=== Urawa Red Diamonds ===
Leonardo made his debut for Urawa in the club's match against Vegalta Sendai in the 2020 J.League Cup group stage on 16 February 2020. He scored twice in the first-half as Urawa won 5–2. He made his league debut five days later and scored the club's second goal of a 3–2 away victory at Shonan Bellmare.

=== Shandong Taishan ===
On 22 February 2021, Leonardo joined Chinese Super League club Shandong Taishan.

On 30 July 2021, Leonardo joined fellow Chinese Super League club Hebei F.C. on loan.

On 24 February 2022, Leonardo joined K League 1 club Ulsan Hyundai on loan.

==== Loan to Changchun Yatai ====
On 7 April 2023, Leonardo joined fellow Chinese Super League club Changchun Yatai on loan. On 30 April 2023, Leonardo scored his first goal for Yatai in a 1–1 home draw against Tianjin Jinmen Tiger. On 19 May 2023, Leonardo scored a hat trick in a 4–2 away win against Cangzhou Mighty Lions. On 30 June 2023, Yatai announced that his loan was terminated prematurely. He scored 10 goals from 12 league appearances for the club, making him top goalscorer of the 2023 Chinese Super League at the time of his departure.

==== Loans to Zhejiang FC ====
On 1 July 2023, Leonardo joined fellow Chinese Super League club Zhejiang FC on loan. On 12 July 2023, Leonardo scored his first 2 goals for Zhejiang in a 2–2 away draw at his former club Changchun Yatai.

On 7 February 2024, he was re-loaned to Zhejiang until the end of the 2024 season.

=== Shanghai Port ===
On 27 January 2025, Leonardo joined fellow Chinese Super League club Shanghai Port.

== Career statistics ==
As of match played 8 November 2026

Appearances and goals by club, season and competition
Club	Season	League			State league		National cup (Note: Includes Emperor's Cup, Korean FA Cup, Chinese FA Cup)		League cup (Note: Includes J.League Cup)		Continental		Other		Total	
Club	Season	Division	Apps	Goals	Apps	Goals	Apps	Goals	Apps	Goals	Apps	Goals	Apps	Goals	Apps	Goals
Ituano	2015	Paulista	—		0	0	—		—		—		6 (Note: Appearances in Copa Paulista)	1	6	1
Ituano	2016	Série D	0	0	0	0	—		—		—		—		0	0
Ituano	Total		0	0	0	0	—		—		—		6	1	6	1
Santos	2017	Série A	0	0	—		0	0	—		—		14	2	14	2
Rio Verde (loan)	2017	Goiano	—		3	0	—		—		—		—		3	0
Gainare Tottori	2018	J3 League	31	24	—		2	0	—		—		—		33	24
Albirex Niigata	2019	J2 League	38	28	—		0	0	—		—		—		38	28
Urawa Red Diamonds	2020	J1 League	28	11	—		0	0	2	2	—		—		30	13
Shandong Taishan	2021	Chinese Super League	8	1	—		0	0	—		—		—		8	1
Hebei FC (loan)	2021	Chinese Super League	12	1	—		0	0	—		—		—		12	1
Ulsan Hyundai (loan)	2022	K League 1	34	11	—		2	0	—		7 (Note: Appearances in AFC Champions League)	3	—		43	14
Changchun Yatai (loan)	2023	Chinese Super League	12	10	—		1	1	—		—		—		13	11
Zhejiang FC (loan)	2023	Chinese Super League	16	9	—		1	1	—		6	4	—		23	14
Zhejiang FC (loan)	2024	Chinese Super League	29	21	—		2	1	—		—		—		31	22
Zhejiang FC (loan)	Total		45	30	—		3	2	—		6	4	—		54	36
Shanghai Port	2025	Chinese Super League	30	21	—		1	0	—		5 (Note: Appearances in AFC Champions League Elite)	1	1 (Note: Appearance(s) in Chinese Super Cup)	0	37	22
Shanghai Port	2026	Chinese Super League	26	14	—		2	0	—		4	2	1	0	33	16
Shanghai Port	Total		56	35	—		3	0	—		9	3	2	0	70	38
Career total			263	152	3	0	11	3	2	2	22	10	22	3	323	170

== Honours ==
Ulsan Hyundai

- K League 1: 2022

Shanghai Port

- Chinese Super League: 2025

Individual

- J2 League top scorer: 2019 (28 goals)
- J3 League top scorer: 2018 (24 goals)
