= 2023 Chinese Super League =

Chinese Super League
- Season: 2023
- Dates: 15 April – 4 November
- Champions: Shanghai Port
- AFC Champions League Elite: Shanghai Port; Shanghai Shenhua; Shandong Taishan
- AFC Champions League Two: Zhejiang
- Matches: 240
- Goals: 666 (2.78 per match)
- Top goalscorer: Leonardo (19 goals)
- Biggest home win: Henan 6–0 Cangzhou Mighty Lions (21 October 2023)
- Biggest away win: Nantong Zhiyun 0–5 Wuhan Three Towns (23 May 2023); Shanghai Shenhua 0–5 Shanghai Port (29 July 2023); Qingdao Hainiu 0–5 Shanghai Port (8 August 2023); Shenzhen 0–5 Zhejiang (24 September 2023)
- Highest scoring: Beijing Guoan 6–2 Cangzhou Mighty Lions (23 May 2023)
- Longest winning run: 6 matches Shanghai Port
- Longest unbeaten run: 16 matches Tianjin Jinmen Tiger
- Longest winless run: 20 matches Shenzhen
- Longest losing run: 12 matches Shenzhen
- Highest attendance: 52,500; Beijing Guoan 2–1 Shanghai Shenhua (19 August 2023)
- Lowest attendance: 4,858; Zhejiang 0–2 Changchun Yatai (15 April 2023)
- Total attendance: 4,767,836
- Average attendance: 19,866

The 2023 Ping An Chinese Football Association Super League (Chinese: 2023中国平安中国足球协会超级联赛) was the 20th season since the establishment of the Chinese Super League. The league title sponsor is Ping An Insurance. Wuhan Three Towns were the defending champions.

== Clubs ==
=== Club changes ===
==== To Super League ====
**Clubs promoted from 2022 China League One**

- ~~Kunshan~~
- Qingdao Hainiu
- Nantong Zhiyun

==== From Super League ====
**Clubs relegated to 2023 China League One**

- Guangzhou

**Dissolved entries**

- ~~Guangzhou City~~
- ~~Wuhan Yangtze River~~
- ~~Hebei~~

Qingdao Hainiu returns to the division after a 9-year absence; Nantong Zhiyun competes in the Chinese Super League for the first time in the club's history. Guangzhou were relegated to China League One after a 12-year spell in the Chinese Super League. Guangzhou City were dissolved after 11 seasons in the top-flight.

==== Name changes ====
- Henan Songshan Longmen F.C. changed their name to Henan in April 2023.

=== Clubs information ===
Team	Head coach	City	Stadium	Capacity	2022 season
Wuhan Three Towns	(Japan) Tsutomu Takahata	Wuhan	Wuhan Sports Center	56,201	1st
Shandong Taishan	(South Korea) Choi Kang-hee	Jinan	Jinan Olympic Sports Center Stadium	56,808	2nd
Zhejiang	(Spain) Jordi Vinyals	Hangzhou	Huzhou Olympic Sports Center (Huzhou) (Note: Zhejiang played their games in Huzhou this season to make way for the 2022 Asian Games, which used their traditional home ground.)	40,000	3rd
Shanghai Port	(Spain) Javier Pereira	Shanghai	Pudong Football Stadium	37,000	4th
Chengdu Rongcheng	(South Korea) Seo Jung-won	Chengdu	Phoenix Hill Football Stadium (Note: Chengdu played all but 3 home games at Phoenix Hill, except from 11 July to 29 July.)	50,695	5th
Chengdu Rongcheng	(South Korea) Seo Jung-won	Chengdu	Leshan Olympic Sports Center (Leshan) (Note: Chengdu played 3 home games in Leshan from 11 July to 29 July.)	30,000	5th
Henan	(Spain) Sergio Zarco Díaz	Zhengzhou	Hanghai Stadium	29,860	6th
Beijing Guoan	(Portugal) Ricardo Soares	Beijing	Workers' Stadium	68,000	7th
Tianjin Jinmen Tiger	(China) Yu Genwei	Tianjin	Tianjin Olympic Centre (Note: Tianjin played at the Tianjin Olympic Centre from the start of the season to 7 July.)	54,696	8th
Tianjin Jinmen Tiger	(China) Yu Genwei	Tianjin	TEDA Soccer Stadium (Note: Tianjin played at the TEDA Soccer Stadium from 21 July to the end of the season.)	36,390	8th
Meizhou Hakka	(Serbia) Milan Ristić	Wuhua	Wuhua County Olympic Sports Centre	27,000	9th
Shanghai Shenhua	(China) Wu Jingui	Shanghai	Shanghai Stadium	72,436	10th
Dalian Pro	(China) Xie Hui	Dalian	Dalian Sports Centre Stadium (Note: Dalian played at the Dalian Sports Centre Stadium from the start of the season to 5 August, with the exception of 2 July and 16 July.)	60,832	11th
Dalian Pro	(China) Xie Hui	Dalian	Dalian Suoyuwan Football Stadium (Note: Dalian played at Suoyuwan on 2 July, 16 July, 20 October, and 4 November.)	63,677	11th
Dalian Pro	(China) Xie Hui	Dalian	Puwan Stadium (Note: Dalian played at Puwan Stadium on 13 August, 19 August, and 23 September.)	30,000	11th
Cangzhou Mighty Lions	(China) Zhao Junzhe	Cangzhou	Cangzhou Stadium	31,836	12th
Changchun Yatai	(China) Chen Yang	Changchun	Changchun Stadium	41,638	13th
Shenzhen	(China) Xiang Jun	Shenzhen	Shenzhen Universiade Sports Centre (Note: Shenzhen played at the Universiade Sports Centre from the start of the season to 29 June.)	60,334	14th
Shenzhen	(China) Xiang Jun	Shenzhen	Bao'an Stadium (Note: Shenzhen played at Bao'an Stadium from 3 July to the end of the season.)	44,050	14th
Qingdao Hainiu ^{P}	(Spain) Antonio Gómez-Carreño Escalona	Qingdao	Qingdao Youth Football Stadium	50,000	CL1, 2nd
Nantong Zhiyun ^{P}	(Portugal) David Patrício (caretaker)	Rugao	Rugao Olympic Sports Center	25,000	CL1, 3rd

=== Clubs locations ===
Location of teams in 2023 Chinese Super League

=== Managerial changes ===
Team	Outgoing manager	Manner of departure	Date of vacancy	Position in table	Incoming manager	Date of appointment
Nantong Zhiyun	(China) Cao Rui	Resigned	4 January 2023	Pre-season	(Portugal) David Patrício	30 January 2023
Qingdao Hainiu	(China) Yin Tiesheng	Mutual consent	13 February 2023	Pre-season	(Spain) Antonio Gómez-Carreño Escalona	13 February 2023
Cangzhou Mighty Lions	(Serbia) Svetozar Šapurić	Mutual consent	21 February 2023	Pre-season	(China) Zhao Junzhe	21 February 2023
Henan	(Spain) Javier Pereira	Signed by Shanghai Port	1 March 2023	Pre-season	(Spain) Sergio Zarco Díaz	6 March 2023
Shanghai Port	(China) Xi Zhikang (caretaker)	End of caretaker spell	1 March 2023	Pre-season	(Spain) Javier Pereira	1 March 2023
Shenzhen	(China) Zhang Xiaorui (caretaker)	End of caretaker spell	10 April 2023	Pre-season	(China) Chen Tao	10 April 2023
Shandong Taishan	(China) Hao Wei	Mutual consent	16 May 2023	9th	(South Korea) Choi Kang-hee	16 May 2023
Nantong Zhiyun	(Portugal) David Patrício	Appointed as technical director	20 May 2023	14th	(China) Zhu Qi (caretaker)	20 May 2023
Beijing Guoan	(Netherlands) Stanley Menzo	Sacked	11 June 2023	7th	(Portugal) Ricardo Soares	15 June 2023
Nantong Zhiyun	(China) Zhu Qi (caretaker)	End of caretaker spell	16 June 2023	14th	(Spain) Gabri	16 June 2023
Wuhan Three Towns	(Spain) Pedro Morilla	Mutual consent	17 June 2023	8th	(Japan) Tsutomu Takahata	18 June 2023
Shenzhen	(China) Chen Tao	Resigned	14 July 2023	16th	(China) Xiang Jun	14 July 2023
Nantong Zhiyun	(Spain) Gabri	Resigned	25 September 2023	14th	(Portugal) David Patrício (caretaker)	25 September 2023

=== Foreign players ===
- Players name in **bold** indicates the player is registered during the mid-season transfer window.
- Players in italics were out of the squad or left the club within the season, after the pre-season transfer window, or in the mid-season transfer window, and at least had one appearance.

Team	Player 1	Player 2	Player 3	Player 4	Player 5	Naturalized players	Hong Kong/Macau/ Taiwan players^{1}	Reserves players	Former players
Beijing Guoan	(Angola) **Fábio Abreu**	(Brazil) Josef de Souza	(Cameroon) Michael Ngadeu-Ngadjui	(South Korea) Kang Sang-woo		(England) → (China) Nico Yennaris^{2}			(Nigeria) Samuel Adegbenro (North Macedonia) Arijan Ademi
Cangzhou Mighty Lions	(Curaçao) Jürgen Locadia	(Democratic Republic of the Congo) Oscar Maritu	(Kazakhstan) Georgy Zhukov	(Netherlands) Deabeas Owusu-Sekyere					(Croatia) Mile Škorić
Changchun Yatai	(Austria) Peter Žulj	(Brazil) Serginho	(Denmark) Jores Okore	(Serbia) **Nenad Lukić**					(Brazil) Leonardo
Chengdu Rongcheng	(Austria) Richard Windbichler	(Brazil) **Andrigo**	(Brazil) Felipe	(Colombia) Manuel Palacios	(South Korea) Kim Min-woo	(Brazil) → (China) Elkeson^{2}	(Chinese Taipei) Tim Chow		(Brazil) Rômulo
Dalian Pro	(Bulgaria) Borislav Tsonev	(Central African Republic) Lobi Manzoki	(Germany) Streli Mamba	(Serbia) Nemanja Bosančić			(Hong Kong) Vas Nuñez		
Henan	(Bosnia and Herzegovina) Toni Šunjić	(Cape Verde) **Hildeberto Pereira**	(Poland) Adrian Mierzejewski	(Serbia) **Đorđe Denić**	(Serbia) Nemanja Čović	(Russia) → (China) Li Tenglong^{2}			(Brazil) Fernando Karanga (Spain) Tomás Pina
Meizhou Hakka	(Brazil) Rodrigo Henrique	(Montenegro) Nebojša Kosović	(Netherlands) **Tyrone Conraad**	(Serbia) Rade Dugalić	(Slovenia) **Andrej Kotnik**		(Hong Kong) Yue Tze Nam		(Georgia (country)) Elguja Lobjanidze (Nigeria) Chisom Egbuchulam
Nantong Zhiyun	(Brazil) Bressan	(Brazil) Lucas Morelatto	(Croatia) **David Puclin**	(Guinea-Bissau) Romário Baldé	(Honduras) Rubilio Castillo	(Spain) → (China) David Wang (Switzerland) → (China) Ming-yang Yang			(Hong Kong) Li Ngai Hoi (Mauritania) Oumar Camara
Qingdao Hainiu	(Bosnia and Herzegovina) Elvis Sarić	(Costa Rica) Felicio Brown Forbes	(Serbia) Aleksandar Andrejević	(Serbia) **Marko Šarić**	(Zambia) Evans Kangwa		(Chinese Taipei) Wang Chien-ming		(Cameroon) Serge Tabekou
Shandong Taishan	(Belgium) Marouane Fellaini	(Brazil) Cryzan	(Brazil) Jadson	(Brazil) **Matheus Pato**	(Brazil) Moisés	(Brazil) → (China) Fernandinho			(Portugal) → (China) Pedro Delgado (South Korea) Son Jun-ho
Shanghai Port	(Angola) **Lucas João**	(Argentina) Matías Vargas	(Austria) Markus Pink	(Brazil) Oscar	(Sierra Leone) Issa Kallon	(England) → (China) Tyias Browning^{2}			(Brazil) Paulinho
Shanghai Shenhua	(Cameroon) Christian Bassogog	(France) Ibrahim Amadou	(Portugal) João Carlos Teixeira	(Switzerland) Cephas Malele	(United States) Macario Hing-Glover	(Hong Kong) → (China) **Dai Wai Tsun**^{2}			
Shenzhen	(France) Romain Alessandrini	(Ghana) Frank Acheampong	(Ghana) **Mubarak Wakaso**				(Chinese Taipei) Will Donkin		(Hong Kong) → (China) Dai Wai Tsun
Tianjin Jinmen Tiger	(Brazil) Farley Rosa	(Bulgaria) **Petar Vitanov**	(Slovenia) Robert Berić	(Spain) David Andújar	(Spain) Fran Mérida				
Wuhan Three Towns	(Brazil) Davidson	(Brazil) **Marcão**	(Ghana) Abdul-Aziz Yakubu	(South Korea) **Park Ji-soo**		(Italy) → (China) Denny Wang^{2}			(Brazil) Ademilson (Brazil) Wallace (Romania) Nicolae Stanciu
Zhejiang	(Brazil) **Leonardo**	(Brazil) Lucas Possignolo	(Croatia) Franko Andrijašević	(Ivory Coast) Jean Evrard Kouassi	(Zimbabwe) Nyasha Mushekwi	(Gabon) → (China) Alexander N'Doumbou^{2}	(Hong Kong) Leung Nok Hang		(Cameroon) Donovan Ewolo

- **^1** For Hong Kong, Macau, or Taiwanese players, if they are non-naturalized and were registered as professional footballers in Hong Kong's, Macau's, or Chinese Taipei's football association for the first time, they are recognized as native players. Otherwise they are recognized as foreign players.
- **^2** Players who have already capped for a China senior or youth national team.

== League table ==
Pos	Team	Pld	W	D	L	GF	GA	GD	Pts	Qualification or relegation
1	Shanghai Port (C)	30	19	6	5	61	30	+31	63	Qualification for AFC Champions League Elite League stage
2	Shandong Taishan	30	16	10	4	59	25	+34	58	Qualification for AFC Champions League Elite play-off round
3	Zhejiang	30	16	7	7	57	34	+23	55	Qualification for AFC Champions League Two group stage
4	Chengdu Rongcheng	30	15	8	7	51	32	+19	53	
5	Shanghai Shenhua (Note: As Chinese FA Cup winners.)	30	15	7	8	34	31	+3	52	Qualification for AFC Champions League Elite League stage
6	Beijing Guoan	30	14	9	7	53	35	+18	51	
7	Wuhan Three Towns	30	14	9	7	51	35	+16	51	
8	Tianjin Jinmen Tiger	30	11	15	4	40	29	+11	48	
9	Changchun Yatai	30	10	9	11	44	48	−4	39	
10	Henan	30	9	9	12	38	40	−2	36	
11	Meizhou Hakka	30	9	7	14	42	54	−12	34	
12	Cangzhou Mighty Lions	30	8	7	15	29	60	−31	31	
13	Qingdao Hainiu	30	7	7	16	34	45	−11	28	
14	Nantong Zhiyun	30	4	10	16	26	42	−16	22	
15	Dalian Pro	30	3	11	16	25	47	−22	20	Dissolved
16	Shenzhen	30	3	3	24	22	79	−57	12	Dissolved

Source: Soccerway
Rules for classification:
- During season: 1) Points; 2) Goal difference; 3) Goals scored.
- After season: 1) Points; 2) Head-to-head points; 3) Head-to-head goal difference; 4) Head-to-head goals scored; 5) Scores of the weight ratio of the reserve league and youth leagues.
  (C) Champions
  Notes:

== Results ==
Home \ Away	BJG	CML	CCY	CDR	DLP	HEN	MZH	NTZ	QDH	SDT	SHP	SHS	SZH	TJT	WTT	ZHJ
Beijing Guoan	—	6–2	4–3	2–3	2–0	3–1	1–1	1–0	2–0	0–0	1–2	2–1	5–0	1–1	1–1	0–1
Cangzhou Mighty Lions	1–5	—	2–4	2–1	2–1	0–1	0–1	1–1	0–0	1–1	0–1	0–1	1–0	1–1	2–1	2–1
Changchun Yatai	1–1	3–1	—	1–0	3–2	3–1	2–4	1–1	1–0	0–3	0–3	1–1	4–1	1–1	3–4	2–2
Chengdu Rongcheng	0–1	2–1	2–2	—	4–1	2–0	3–0	1–0	3–2	2–2	2–1	2–1	4–0	0–0	0–1	1–2
Dalian Pro	2–2	1–1	0–0	0–0	—	0–3	1–1	2–1	1–1	0–0	2–3	2–1	2–1	0–1	1–3	1–2
Henan	0–1	6–0	1–1	1–1	1–0	—	2–1	1–1	0–0	0–1	3–1	3–0	3–1	1–0	1–1	2–2
Meizhou Hakka	3–1	2–3	4–2	3–1	2–1	0–0	—	0–4	1–0	2–1	0–2	0–1	5–1	1–1	1–2	1–1
Nantong Zhiyun	0–1	1–2	0–1	0–2	1–1	1–0	2–2	—	1–0	1–1	0–1	0–1	1–1	1–2	0–5	1–2
Qingdao Hainiu	3–1	1–1	1–0	3–2	2–2	2–0	2–0	3–1	—	0–1	0–5	0–1	5–0	1–4	0–3	2–2
Shandong Taishan	3–0	4–0	4–1	0–1	2–0	5–1	6–1	1–1	4–2	—	1–1	3–0	3–0	1–0	2–1	2–1
Shanghai Port	1–2	3–0	2–0	0–1	1–1	3–2	1–1	2–1	2–1	1–1	—	1–1	3–2	2–1	3–1	3–4
Shanghai Shenhua	1–1	2–0	1–0	1–1	1–0	1–1	2–1	1–0	1–0	1–0	0–5	—	3–0	1–2	1–1	1–2
Shenzhen	0–3	0–1	0–1	0–3	2–1	1–1	3–2	0–1	2–1	1–2	1–4	1–3	—	0–2	1–3	0–5
Tianjin Jinmen Tiger	0–0	1–1	0–0	2–2	1–0	1–0	3–1	1–1	3–2	3–3	0–0	1–1	3–3	—	1–1	2–1
Wuhan Three Towns	1–1	2–0	2–1	3–3	0–0	4–2	2–1	4–2	1–0	1–1	0–2	1–2	1–0	0–1	—	0–0
Zhejiang	3–2	6–1	0–2	0–2	3–0	3–0	3–0	1–1	0–0	2–1	1–2	0–1	3–0	2–1	2–1	—

Source: Soccerway
Legend: Blue = home team win; Yellow = draw; Red = away team win.
For upcoming matches, an "a" indicates there is an article about the rivalry between the two participants.

== Positions by round ==
To preserve chronological evolvements, any postponed matches are not included to the round at which they were originally scheduled, but added to the full round they were played immediately afterwards. For example, if a match is scheduled for round 7, but then played between rounds 8 and 9, it will be added to the standings for round 8.

Team ╲ Round	1	2	3	4	5	6	7	8	9	10	11	12	13	14	15	16	17	18	19	20	21	22	23	24	25	26	27	28	29	30
Shanghai Port	2	2	1	1	3	2	1	1	1	1	1	1	1	1	1	1	1	1	1	1	1	1	1	1	1	1	1	1	1	1
Shandong Taishan	14	14	9	9	12	10	9	8	8	8	5	6	5	6	5	4	4	4	4	2	4	3	2	2	2	2	2	2	2	2
Zhejiang	16	16	16	16	16	16	16	16	11	9	9	9	8	9	9	9	9	9	8	6	7	6	7	6	4	3	3	4	3	3
Chengdu Rongcheng	8	4	5	4	2	3	3	3	3	2	2	3	3	3	3	3	3	3	3	4	3	4	6	7	7	5	6	6	5	4
Shanghai Shenhua	5	3	2	2	1	1	2	2	2	3	3	2	2	2	2	2	2	2	2	3	2	2	3	3	5	4	4	3	4	5
Beijing Guoan	6	8	13	13	7	8	7	7	7	7	6	7	7	7	6	6	6	6	7	5	6	5	4	4	6	6	5	5	6	6
Wuhan Three Towns	15	15	10	6	6	6	6	6	6	6	8	8	9	8	7	8	8	7	5	7	5	7	5	5	3	7	7	7	7	7
Tianjin Jinmen Tiger	11	5	3	3	5	4	4	4	5	4	4	4	4	4	4	5	5	5	6	8	8	8	9	8	8	8	8	8	8	8
Changchun Yatai	1	1	4	5	4	5	5	5	4	5	7	5	6	5	8	7	7	8	9	9	10	9	8	9	9	9	9	9	9	9
Henan	9	9	12	12	15	13	15	12	13	13	10	11	10	11	11	12	13	13	12	12	13	12	12	11	10	10	11	10	10	10
Meizhou Hakka	10	12	15	15	9	7	8	10	9	12	13	13	13	13	12	11	12	12	11	13	11	11	11	12	12	11	10	11	11	11
Cangzhou Mighty Lions	7	10	14	14	10	11	10	13	14	11	12	10	11	10	10	10	10	10	10	10	9	10	10	10	11	12	12	12	12	12
Qingdao Hainiu	13	13	6	11	13	14	11	9	10	14	15	15	15	15	15	13	11	11	13	11	12	13	13	13	13	13	13	13	13	13
Nantong Zhiyun	12	11	8	8	11	12	14	15	16	16	14	14	14	14	13	14	14	14	14	15	14	15	14	14	14	14	14	14	14	14
Dalian Pro	3	6	7	7	8	9	13	14	15	15	16	16	16	16	16	15	15	15	15	14	15	14	15	15	15	15	15	15	15	15
Shenzhen	4	7	11	10	14	15	12	11	12	10	11	12	12	12	14	16	16	16	16	16	16	16	16	16	16	16	16	16	16	16

Leader and qualification for AFC Champions League Elite League stage
Qualification for AFC Champions League Elite play-off round
Qualification for AFC Champions League Two group stage

Source: Soccerway

== Results by match played ==
Team ╲ Round	1	2	3	4	5	6	7	8	9	10	11	12	13	14	15	16	17	18	19	20	21	22	23	24	25	26	27	28	29	30
Beijing Guoan	D	D	L	D	W	D	W	D	W	L	W	D	L	W	W	L	D	W	L	W	D	W	W	W	L	D	W	W	L	W
Cangzhou Mighty Lions	D	L	L	D	W	D	D	L	L	W	L	W	L	W	D	D	W	L	W	W	W	L	L	L	L	L	L	L	L	D
Changchun Yatai	W	W	L	D	W	L	D	W	W	L	L	W	L	W	L	D	D	D	D	D	L	W	W	L	L	D	W	L	D	L
Chengdu Rongcheng	D	W	D	W	W	D	D	D	W	W	W	D	W	L	L	W	L	W	L	L	W	L	L	D	W	W	D	W	W	W
Dalian Pro	W	L	D	D	L	D	L	L	L	L	L	D	D	D	D	D	D	L	L	W	L	W	L	L	L	D	L	L	D	L
Henan	D	D	L	D	L	D	L	W	L	D	W	D	W	L	L	L	L	D	W	L	L	W	W	W	W	D	L	W	D	L
Meizhou Hakka	D	L	L	D	W	W	L	L	D	L	L	L	L	D	W	W	L	L	W	L	W	W	D	L	W	D	W	D	L	L
Nantong Zhiyun	L	D	W	D	L	L	L	D	L	L	W	L	L	D	D	D	D	D	L	D	D	L	W	L	L	L	L	L	W	L
Qingdao Hainiu	L	D	W	L	L	L	W	D	L	L	L	L	L	D	D	W	W	L	L	W	L	L	D	W	L	W	L	L	D	D
Shandong Taishan	L	D	W	D	L	D	D	D	W	W	W	D	W	D	W	W	D	L	W	W	L	W	W	W	W	D	W	W	D	W
Shanghai Port	W	W	W	D	D	W	W	W	W	W	L	W	W	D	D	W	W	W	W	W	W	L	D	L	W	L	W	L	D	W
Shanghai Shenhua	W	W	W	D	W	W	D	D	L	D	W	W	W	L	W	L	W	D	L	L	W	W	L	D	L	W	W	W	D	L
Shenzhen	W	L	L	D	L	L	W	D	L	W	L	L	L	L	L	L	L	D	L	L	L	L	L	L	L	L	L	L	L	L
Tianjin Jinmen Tiger	D	W	W	D	D	D	W	D	D	W	D	D	W	W	D	D	L	D	D	L	D	L	L	W	W	W	D	W	D	W
Wuhan Three Towns	L	D	W	W	D	D	D	D	W	L	D	D	D	W	W	L	D	W	W	L	W	L	W	W	W	L	L	W	W	W
Zhejiang	L	L	L	L	D	W	L	D	W	W	W	D	W	L	L	D	W	W	W	W	D	W	D	W	W	W	W	D	W	W

Source: Soccerway
W = Win; D = Draw; L = Loss

== Statistics ==
=== Top scorers ===
Rank	Player	Club	Goals
1	(Brazil) Leonardo	Changchun Yatai & Zhejiang	19
2	(China) Wu Lei	Shanghai Port	18
2	(Zimbabwe) Nyasha Mushekwi	Zhejiang	18
4	(Ghana) Abdul-Aziz Yakubu	Wuhan Three Towns	15
4	(Serbia) Nemanja Čović	Henan	15
6	(Brazil) Felipe	Chengdu Rongcheng	13
7	(Brazil) Cryzan	Shandong Taishan	12
8	(Belgium) Marouane Fellaini	Shandong Taishan	11
8	(Switzerland) Cephas Malele	Shanghai Shenhua	11
10	(Angola) Fábio Abreu	Beijing Guoan	10
10	(China) Tan Long	Changchun Yatai	10
10	(Slovenia) Robert Berić	Tianjin Jinmen Tiger	10

==== Hat-tricks ====
Player	Club	Against	Result	Date
(Brazil) Leonardo	Changchun Yatai	Cangzhou Mighty Lions	4–2 (A)	19 May 2023
(China) Tao Qianglong	Wuhan Three Towns	Nantong Zhiyun	5–2 (A)	23 May 2023
(Ghana) Abdul-Aziz Yakubu	Wuhan Three Towns	Shenzhen	3–1 (A)	3 July 2023
(China) Wang Ziming	Beijing Guoan	Shenzhen	5–0 (H)	8 July 2023
(Costa Rica) Felicio Brown Forbes	Qingdao Hainiu	Shenzhen	5–0 (H)	12 July 2023
(Brazil) Felipe	Chengdu Rongcheng	Dalian Pro	4–1 (H)	22 July 2023
(China) Hu Jinghang	Shandong Taishan	Henan	5–1 (H)	4 November 2023

Notes

- (H) – Home team
- (A) – Away team

=== Top assists ===
Rank	Player	Club	Assists
1	(Brazil) Oscar	Shanghai Port	13
2	(Romania) Nicolae Stanciu	Wuhan Three Towns	12
3	(Brazil) Moisés	Shandong Taishan	10
4	(Brazil) Leonardo	Changchun Yatai & Zhejiang	8
4	(Brazil) Rômulo	Chengdu Rongcheng	8
6	(Brazil) Felipe	Chengdu Rongcheng	7
6	(China) Ba Dun	Tianjin Jinmen Tiger	7
6	(Curaçao) Jürgen Locadia	Cangzhou Mighty Lions	7
9	7 players		6

=== Clean sheets ===
Rank	Player	Club	Clean sheets
1	(China) Wang Dalei	Shandong Taishan	10
1	(China) Yan Junling	Shanghai Port	10
3	(China) Liu Dianzuo	Wuhan Three Towns	8
3	(China) Wang Guoming	Henan	8
3	(China) Zhao Bo	Zhejiang	8
6	(China) Bao Yaxiong	Shanghai Shenhua	7
6	(China) Wu Yake	Changchun Yatai	7
8	(China) Han Jiaqi	Beijing Guoan	6
8	(China) Xu Jiamin	Tianjin Jinmen Tiger	6
8	(China) Zhang Yan	Chengdu Rongcheng	6

=== Discipline ===
==== Player ====
- Most yellow cards: 8
  - (Belgium) Marouane Fellaini (Shandong Taishan)
  - (Bosnia and Herzegovina) Elvis Sarić (Qingdao Hainiu)
  - (China) Jiang Shenglong (Shanghai Shenhua)
  - (China) Pan Ximing (Meizhou Hakka)
- Most red cards: 2
  - 7 players

==== Club ====
- Most yellow cards: 73
  - Henan
- Fewest yellow cards: 42
  - Shanghai Port
- Most red cards: 7
  - Zhejiang
- Fewest red cards: 1
  - Nantong Zhiyun

== Awards ==
=== Annual awards ===
The awards of 2023 Chinese Super League were announced on 4 January 2024. This was the first time the annual awards were resumed since 2019, however the winners were only announced online with no ceremony being held.

Award	Winner	Club
Player of the Season	(China) Wu Lei	Shanghai Port
Golden Boot	(Brazil) Leonardo	Changchun Yatai / Zhejiang
Goalkeeper of the Season	(China) Wang Dalei	Shandong Taishan
Young Player of the Season	(China) Shahsat Hujahmat	Shenzhen
Manager of the Season	(South Korea) Choi Kang-hee	Shandong Taishan
Best Referee	(China) Ma Ning	

Team of the Year
Goalkeeper	(China) Wang Dalei (Shandong Taishan)			
Defender	(Cameroon) Michael Ngadeu-Ngadjui (Beijing Guoan)		(China) Jiang Shenglong (Shanghai Shenhua)	(China) Zhu Chenjie (Shanghai Shenhua)
Midfielder	(Brazil) Oscar (Shanghai Port)	(China) Xie Pengfei (Wuhan Three Towns)	(Croatia) Franko Andrijašević (Zhejiang)	(Chinese Taipei) Tim Chow (Chengdu Rongcheng)
Forward	(Brazil) Cryzan (Shandong Taishan)		(Brazil) Leonardo (Changchun Yatai / Zhejiang)	(China) Wu Lei (Shanghai Port)

=== Player of the Round ===
The following players were named the Player of the Round.

Round	Player	Club	References
1	(China) Yan Xiangchuang	Dalian Pro	
2	(Slovenia) Robert Berić	Tianjin Jinmen Tiger	
3	(Brazil) Farley Rosa	Tianjin Jinmen Tiger	
4	(Brazil) Felipe	Chengdu Rongcheng	
5	(China) Yu Hanchao	Shanghai Shenhua	
6	(China) Gao Di	Zhejiang	
7	(China) Wu Lei	Shanghai Port	
8	(Brazil) Leonardo	Changchun Yatai	
9	(China) Tao Qianglong	Wuhan Three Towns	
10	(Croatia) Mile Škorić	Cangzhou Mighty Lions	
11	(Serbia) Nemanja Čović	Henan	
12	(Central African Republic) Lobi Manzoki	Dalian Pro	
13	(Brazil) Farley Rosa	Tianjin Jinmen Tiger	
14	(China) Nebijan Muhmet	Beijing Guoan	
15	(China) Wang Ziming	Beijing Guoan	
16	(Costa Rica) Felicio Brown Forbes	Qingdao Hainiu	
17	(China) Yu Hanchao	Shanghai Shenhua	
18	(Brazil) Felipe	Chengdu Rongcheng	
19	(China) Wu Lei	Shanghai Port	
20	(Brazil) Moisés	Shandong Taishan	
21	(China) Wu Lei	Shanghai Port	
22	(Zimbabwe) Nyasha Mushekwi	Zhejiang	
23	(Angola) Fábio Abreu	Beijing Guoan	
24	(Serbia) Nemanja Čović	Henan	
25	(China) Wei Shihao	Wuhan Three Towns	
26	(China) Gan Chao	Chengdu Rongcheng	

=== Monthly awards ===
Month	Player of the Month		Manager of the Month		Goalkeeper of the Month	
Month	Player	Club	Manager	Club	Player	Club
April	(China) Yan Xiangchuang	Dalian Pro	(China) Wu Jingui	Shanghai Shenhua	(China) Ma Zhen	Shanghai Shenhua
May	(Brazil) Rômulo	Chengdu Rongcheng	(South Korea) Seo Jung-won	Chengdu Rongcheng	(China) Han Jiaqi	Beijing Guoan
June	(Serbia) Nemanja Čović	Henan	(South Korea) Choi Kang-hee	Shandong Taishan	(China) Xu Jiamin	Tianjin Jinmen Tiger
July	(China) Wu Lei	Shanghai Port	(South Korea) Choi Kang-hee	Shandong Taishan	(China) Mu Pengfei	Qingdao Hainiu
August	(Angola) Fábio Abreu	Beijing Guoan	(Portugal) Ricardo Soares	Beijing Guoan	(China) Zhao Bo	Zhejiang
September	(Belgium) Marouane Fellaini	Shandong Taishan	(Spain) Jordi Vinyals	Zhejiang	(China) Zhao Bo	Zhejiang

Team of the Month
Month	Goalkeeper	Defenders	Midfielders	Forwards
April	(China) Ma Zhen (Shanghai Shenhua)	(China) Zhu Chenjie (Shanghai Shenhua) (China) Jiang Shenglong (Shanghai Shenhua) (Cameroon) Michael Ngadeu-Ngadjui (Beijing Guoan)	(Brazil) Farley Rosa (Tianjin Jinmen Tiger) (Brazil) Oscar (Shanghai Port) (Romania) Nicolae Stanciu (Wuhan Three Towns) (China) Ba Dun (Tianjin Jinmen Tiger)	(China) Yan Xiangchuang (Dalian Pro) (Slovenia) Robert Berić (Tianjin Jinmen Tiger) (China) Wu Lei (Shanghai Port)
May	(China) Han Jiaqi (Beijing Guoan)	(China) Wang Shenchao (Shanghai Port) (Croatia) Mile Škorić (Cangzhou Mighty Lions) (China) Zhang Wei (Qingdao Hainiu)	(China) Ba Dun (Tianjin Jinmen Tiger) (Brazil) Rômulo (Chengdu Rongcheng) (Brazil) Oscar (Shanghai Port) (China) Yu Hanchao (Shanghai Shenhua)	(China) Wu Lei (Shanghai Port) (Brazil) Leonardo (Changchun Yatai) (Ghana) Frank Acheampong (Shenzhen)
June	(China) Xu Jiamin (Tianjin Jinmen Tiger)	(China) Jiang Shenglong (Shanghai Shenhua) (China) Han Pengfei (Tianjin Jinmen Tiger) (China) Hu Ruibao (Chengdu Rongcheng)	(China) Tang Miao (Chengdu Rongcheng) (Brazil) Farley Rosa (Tianjin Jinmen Tiger) (China) Wang Haijian (Shanghai Shenhua) (Brazil) Oscar (Shanghai Port) (South Korea) Kang Sang-woo (Beijing Guoan)	(Serbia) Nemanja Čović (Henan) (Zimbabwe) Nyasha Mushekwi (Zhejiang)
July	(China) Mu Pengfei (Qingdao Hainiu)	(China) Wang Shenchao (Shanghai Port) (Denmark) Jores Okore (Changchun Yatai) (Austria) Richard Windbichler (Chengdu Rongcheng)	(Bosnia and Herzegovina) Elvis Sarić (Qingdao Hainiu) (Brazil) Rodrigo Henrique (Meizhou Hakka) (Brazil) Oscar (Shanghai Port) (Netherlands) Deabeas Owusu-Sekyere (Cangzhou Mighty Lions)	(Brazil) Leonardo (Zhejiang) (Ghana) Abdul-Aziz Yakubu (Wuhan Three Towns) (China) Wu Lei (Shanghai Port)
August	(China) Zhao Bo (Zhejiang)	(China) Jiang Shenglong (Shanghai Shenhua) (China) Zhu Chenjie (Shanghai Shenhua) (Croatia) Mile Škorić (Cangzhou Mighty Lions)	(South Korea) Kang Sang-woo (Beijing Guoan) (Brazil) Moisés (Shandong Taishan) (China) Li Yuanyi (Shandong Taishan) (South Korea) Kim Min-woo (Chengdu Rongcheng)	(Angola) Fábio Abreu (Beijing Guoan) (Zimbabwe) Nyasha Mushekwi (Zhejiang) (Serbia) Nemanja Čović (Henan)
September	(China) Zhao Bo (Zhejiang)	(China) Li Ang (Shanghai Port) (Spain) David Andújar (Tianjin Jinmen Tiger) (China) Han Pengfei (Tianjin Jinmen Tiger)	(Zimbabwe) Nyasha Mushekwi (Zhejiang) (Croatia) Franko Andrijašević (Zhejiang) (Brazil) Oscar (Shanghai Port) (Zambia) Evans Kangwa (Qingdao Hainiu)	(China) Wei Shihao (Wuhan Three Towns) (Belgium) Marouane Fellaini (Shandong Taishan) (Brazil) Leonardo (Zhejiang)

== League attendance ==
Pos	Team	Total	High	Low	Average	Change
1	Beijing Guoan	656,531	52,500	32,239	43,769	n/a
2	Chengdu Rongcheng	524,902	39,998	15,653	34,993	n/a
3	Tianjin Jinmen Tiger	455,929	48,577	17,621	30,395	n/a
4	Shandong Taishan	415,943	45,889	16,377	27,730	n/a
5	Shanghai Shenhua	394,693	28,941	16,327	26,313	n/a
6	Dalian Pro	270,464	35,901	7,966	18,031	n/a
7	Qingdao Hainiu	269,170	33,582	10,052	17,945	n/a
8	Henan	243,693	19,573	11,292	16,246	n/a
9	Changchun Yatai	238,080	27,892	11,137	15,872	n/a
10	Wuhan Three Towns	237,993	35,868	8,227	15,866	n/a
11	Shanghai Port	233,524	20,239	10,205	15,568	n/a
12	Nantong Zhiyun	231,486	20,023	9,289	15,432	n/a
13	Meizhou Hakka	225,056	17,666	7,863	15,004	n/a
14	Cangzhou Mighty Lions	130,376	10,613	6,988	8,692	n/a
15	Zhejiang	120,800	16,231	4,858	8,053	n/a
16	Shenzhen	119,196	9,977	5,139	7,946	n/a
	League total	4,767,836	52,500	4,858	19,866	n/a

Updated to games played on 4 November 2023
