= Cephas Malele =

Swiss footballer (born 1994)

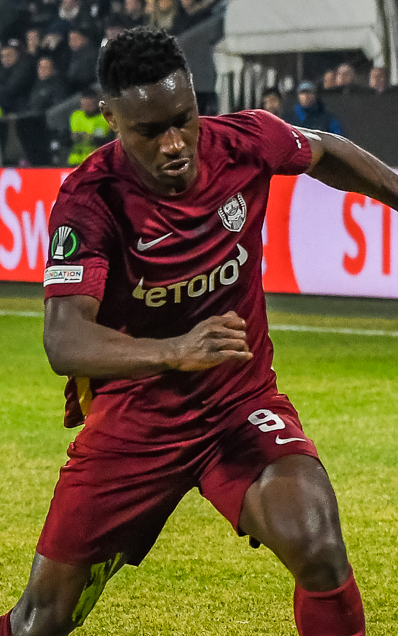
- Malele with CFR Cluj in 2023

Personal information
- Full name: Cephas Malele
- Date of birth: 8 January 1994 (age 32)
- Place of birth: Buco-Zau, Angola
- Height: 1.85 m (6 ft 1 in)
- Position: Forward

Team information
- Current team: Dalian Yingbo
- Number: 11

Youth career
- 2004–2005: Industrie Zürich
- 2005–2011: Zürich
- 2011–2013: Palermo

Senior career*
Years	Team	Apps	(Gls)
2010–2011	Zürich II	7	(0)
2013–2017	Palermo	6	(0)
2014	→ Virtus Entella (loan)	13	(0)
2015	→ Trapani (loan)	15	(0)
2015–2016	→ Atlético CP (loan)	40	(9)
2016–2017	→ Leixões (loan)	11	(0)
2017	→ Varzim (loan)	21	(5)
2017–2018	Varzim	29	(2)
2018–2019	Arouca	29	(9)
2019–2020	Oliveirense	14	(3)
2020–2021	Argeș Pitești	30	(18)
2021–2023	Al-Tai	26	(4)
2022–2023	→ CFR Cluj (loan)	18	(4)
2023–2024	Shanghai Shenhua	55	(27)
2025–	Dalian Yingbo	44	(14)

International career^{‡}
2009	Switzerland U15	2	(0)
2009–2010	Switzerland U16	5	(5)
2011	Switzerland U17	4	(0)
2011–2012	Switzerland U18	6	(2)
2013	Switzerland U19	2	(0)
- * Club domestic league appearances and goals as of 19 November 2026 ‡ National team caps and goals as of 23 March 2013

Cephas Malele (born 8 January 1994) is a professional footballer who plays as a forward for Chinese Super League club Dalian Yingbo.

After starting out as a senior at FC Zürich II, he went on to play for teams in Italy, Portugal, Romania, Saudi Arabia and China.

Born in Angola, Malele represented Switzerland internationally at under-16, under-17, under-18 and under-19 levels.

== Club career ==
Born in Angola, Malele moved with his family in Switzerland as a child and grew up in the youth system of FC Zürich, also making a couple appearances for their Under-21 reserve side between 2010 and 2011.

During the summer of 2011, he was signed by Palermo and included into their Primavera squad. After a difficult first season due to injuries, Malele became a key player for the main Rosanero youth team throughout the first half of 2012–13 season, pairing with another rising star, Mauro Bollino, and being one of the main topscorers of the Campionato Nazionale Primavera. As a consequence, and also due to lack of strikers in the first team, he was asked by Gian Piero Gasperini to join the senior side, and made his professional Serie A debut on 7 January 2013, playing the final minutes of a league game against Parma. He was featured again on 19 January 2013, playing the final 15 minutes of a home game against Lazio as a replacement to Josip Iličić. He was successively confirmed for the club's triumphal 2013–14 Serie B campaign, where he managed to make only three appearances as a substitute throughout the whole season.

On 28 July 2014, Malele was loaned out to newly promoted Serie B club Virtus Entella for the whole 2014–15 season in order to gain more first team experience.

On 13 August 2021, Malele joined Saudi Arabian club Al-Tai. On 4 August 2022, Malele joined Romanian club CFR Cluj on a season-long loan.

On 30 March 2023, Malele joined Chinese Super League club Shanghai Shenhua.

On 31 December 2024, Shanghai Shenhua announced that Malele is released as a free agent.

== International career ==
Malele has appeared for Switzerland from the under-15 level to the under-19 level.

== Career statistics ==
As of match played on 18 July 2026

Appearances and goals by club, season and competition
Club	Season	League			National cup (Note: Includes Coppa Italia, Taça de Portugal, Cupa României, King's Cup, Chinese FA Cup)		League cup (Note: Includes Taça da Liga)		Continental		Other		Total	
Club	Season	Division	Apps	Goals	Apps	Goals	Apps	Goals	Apps	Goals	Apps	Goals	Apps	Goals
Palermo	2012–13	Serie A	3	0	0	0	—		—		—		3	0
Palermo	2013–14	Serie B	3	0	0	0	—		—		—		3	0
Palermo	Total		6	0	0	0	—		—		—		6	0
Virtus Entella (loan)	2014–15	Serie B	13	0	2	0	—		—		—		15	0
Trapani (loan)	2014–15	Serie B	15	0	—		—		—		—		15	0
Atlético CP (loan)	2015–16	LigaPro	40	9	0	0	2	0	—		—		42	9
Leixões (loan)	2016–17	LigaPro	11	0	2	0	—		—		—		13	0
Varzim (loan)	2016–17	LigaPro	21	5	—		—		—		—		21	5
Varzim	2017–18	LigaPro	29	2	1	0	—		—		—		30	2
Arouca	2018–19	LigaPro	29	9	2	1	1	1	—		—		32	11
Oliveirense	2019–20	LigaPro	14	3	0	0	—		—		—		10	0
Argeș Pitești	2020–21	Liga I	30	18	1	0	—		—		—		31	18
Al-Tai	2021–22	Saudi Professional League	26	4	1	0	—		—		—		27	4
CFR Cluj (loan)	2022–23	Liga I	18	4	2	1	—		8 (Note: Appearances in UEFA Europa Conference League)	0	—		28	5
Shanghai Shenhua	2023	Chinese Super League	29	11	3	4	—		—		—		32	15
Shanghai Shenhua	2024	Chinese Super League	26	16	3	2	—		5 (Note: Appearances in AFC Champions League Elite)	2	1 (Note: Appearance in Chinese Super Cup)	1	35	21
Shanghai Shenhua	Total		55	27	6	6	—		5	2	1	1	67	36
Dalian Yingbo	2025	Chinese Super League	26	6	2	2	—		—		—		28	8
Dalian Yingbo	2026	Chinese Super League	14	8	0	0	—		—		—		14	8
Dalian Yingbo	Total		40	14	2	2	—		—		—		42	16
Career total			347	95	19	10	3	1	13	2	1	1	383	109

== Honours ==
Palermo

- Serie B: 2013–14

Shanghai Shenhua

- Chinese FA Cup: 2023
- Chinese FA Super Cup: 2024

Dalian Yingbo

- Chinese Super League: 2026

Individual

- Liga I Team of the Season: 2020–21
