= Deabeas Owusu-Sekyere =

Dutch footballer

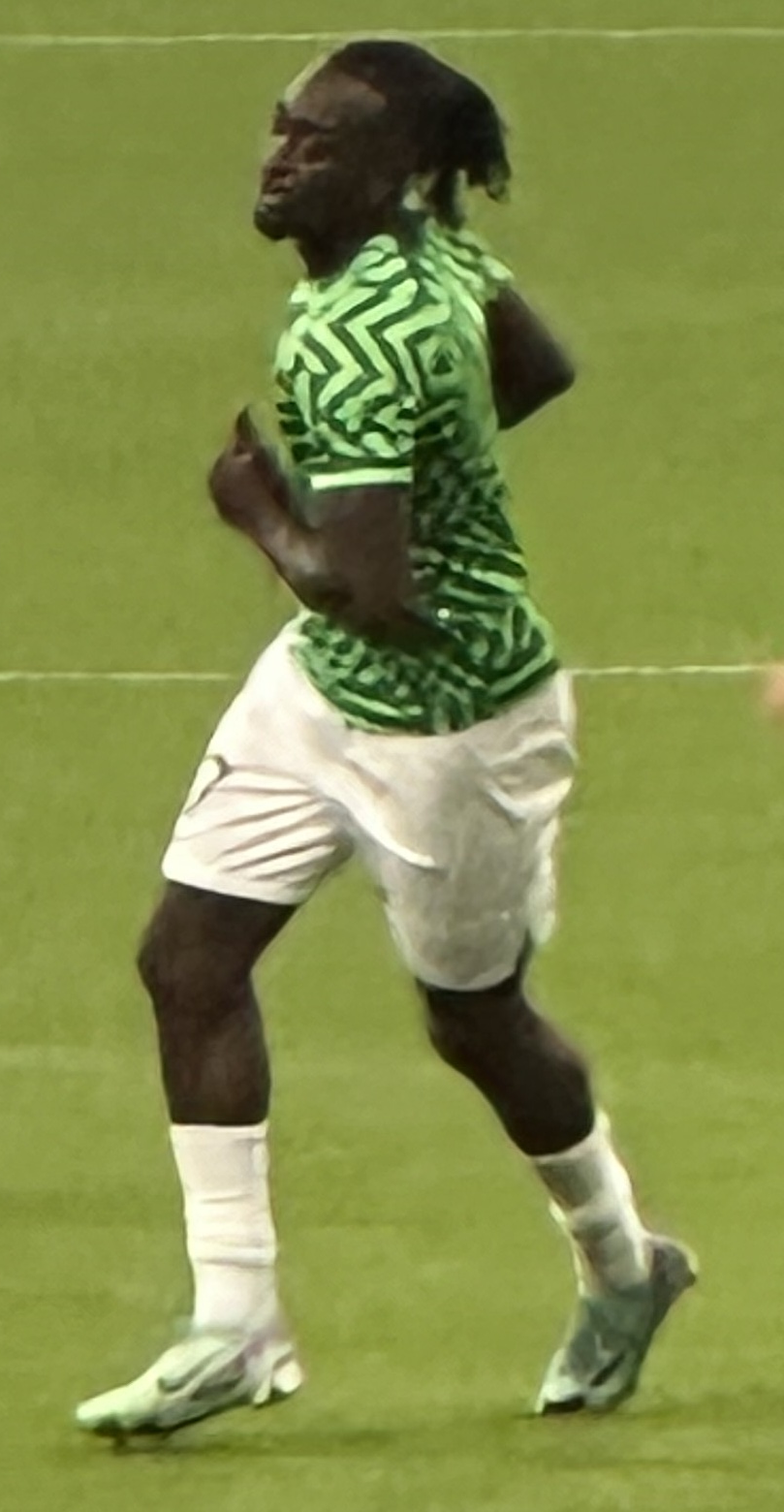
- Owusu-Sekyere in August 2024

Personal information
- Full name: Deabeas Nii Klu Owusu-Sekyere
- Date of birth: 4 November 1999 (age 27)
- Place of birth: Utrecht, Netherlands
- Height: 1.84 m (6 ft 0 in)
- Position: Forward

Team information
- Current team: Shenzhen Peng City
- Number: 31

Youth career
- –2011: Amsterdamsche FC
- 2011–2016: Ajax
- 2016–2017: Twente
- 2017–2018: Leixões

Senior career*
Years	Team	Apps	(Gls)
2018–2020	Leixões	0	(0)
2018–2019	→ Freamunde (loan)	0	(0)
2020–2022	Paide Linnameeskond	52	(27)
2022–2024	Cangzhou Mighty Lions	45	(12)
2024–2025	Zhejiang FC	56	(12)
2026–	Shenzhen Peng City	24	(2)
- * Club domestic league appearances and goals as of 8 November 2026

Deabeas Nii Klu Owusu-Sekyere (born 4 November 1999) is a Dutch footballer who plays as a forward for Chinese Super League club Shenzhen Peng City.

== Career ==
Owusu-Sekyere started his career at Ajax youth academy. After that, he joined the youth academy of Leixões.

In 2021, he joined Estonian club Paide Linnameeskond.

In August 2022, he moved to Chinese club Cangzhou Mighty Lions, where he scored 12 goals in 46 appearances over two seasons in the Chinese Super League.

On 15 January 2024, Owusu-Sekyere joined fellow Chinese Super League club Zhejiang FC.

On 4 January 2026, Owusu-Sekyere joined Chinese Super League club Shenzhen Peng City.

== Career statistics ==
As of match played 8 November 2026

Appearances and goals by club, season and competition
Club	Season	League			Cup^{1}		Continental^{2}		Other^{3}		Total	
Club	Season	Division	Apps	Goals	Apps	Goals	Apps	Goals	Apps	Goals	Apps	Goals
Paide Linnameeskond	2020	Meistriliiga	13	10	1	0	1	0	1	0	16	10
Paide Linnameeskond	2021	Meistriliiga	21	8	5	4	2	0	1	0	29	12
Paide Linnameeskond	2022	Meistriliiga	18	9	—		4	0	—		22	9
Paide Linnameeskond	Total		52	27	6	4	7	0	2	0	67	31
Cangzhou Mighty Lions	2022	Chinese Super League	17	4	0	0	—		—		17	4
Cangzhou Mighty Lions	2023	Chinese Super League	28	8	1	0	—		—		29	8
Cangzhou Mighty Lions	Total		45	12	1	0	—		—		46	12
Zhejiang FC	2024	Chinese Super League	29	9	1	0	4	0	—		34	9
Zhejiang FC	2025	Chinese Super League	27	3	1	0	—		—		28	3
Zhejiang FC	Total		56	12	2	0	4	0	—		62	12
Shenzhen Peng City	2026	Chinese Super League	24	2	2	1	—		—		26	3
Career Total			177	53	11	5	11	0	2	0	201	58

- 1.Includes Estonian Cup and Chinese FA Cup.
- 2.Includes UEFA Europa League and UEFA Europa Conference League.
- 3.Includes Estonian Supercup.

== Honours ==
=== Club ===
- Estonian Cup: 2021–22.
