= Felipe (footballer, born 1992) =

Brazilian footballer

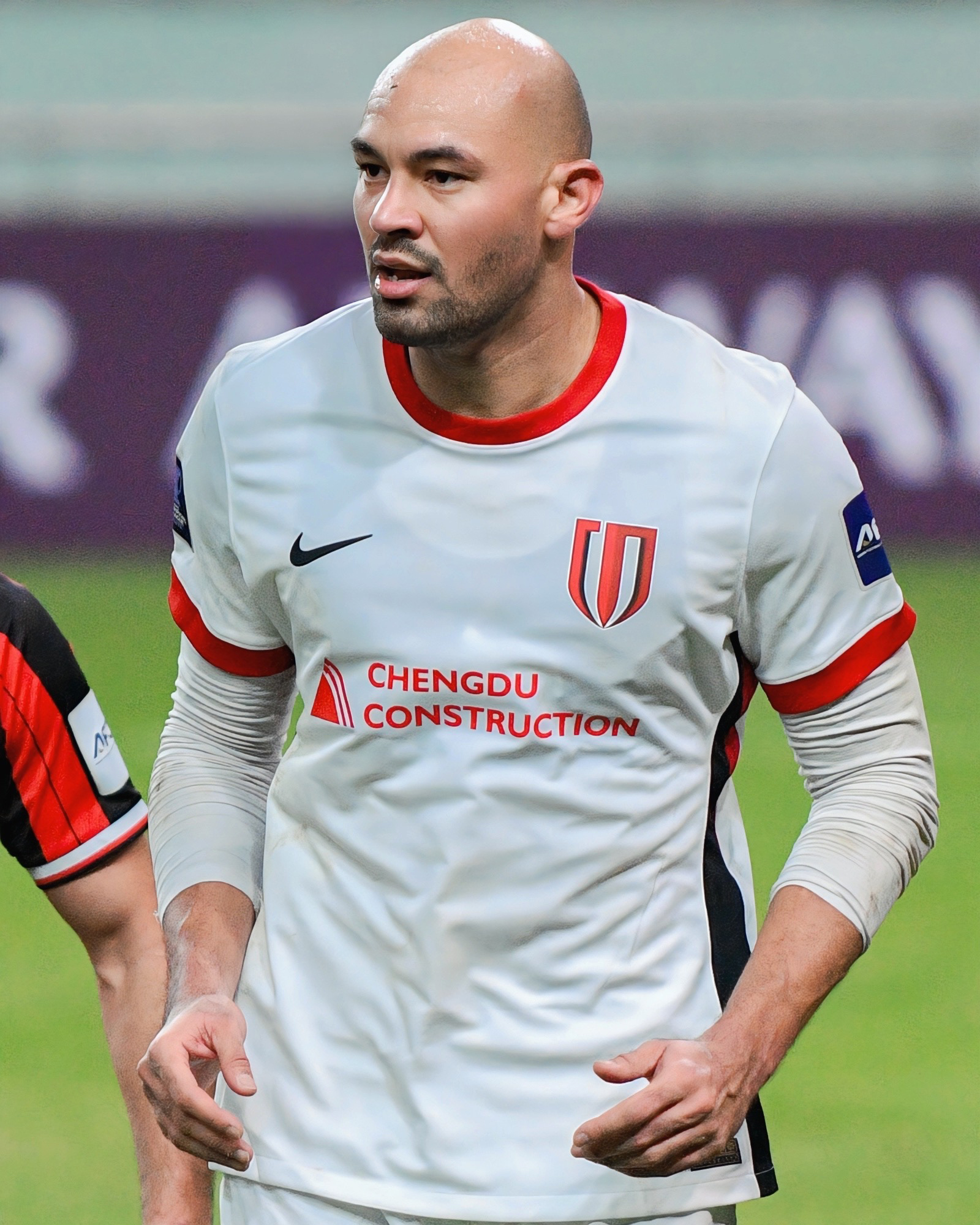
- Felipe in November 2025

Personal information
- Full name: Felipe de Sousa Silva
- Date of birth: 3 April 1992 (age 34)
- Place of birth: Teresina, Brazil
- Height: 1.93 m (6 ft 4 in)
- Position: Forward

Team information
- Current team: Chengdu Rongcheng
- Number: 9

Senior career*
Years	Team	Apps	(Gls)
2012	Guarani de Juazeiro	0	(0)
2013–2014	São Caetano		
2014	→ Primavera (loan)		
2015	Caxias	7	(1)
2015	São Caetano		
2016	Sorocaba		
2016	Ferroviária	0	(0)
2016–2017	Sertãozinho	28	(11)
2017	Bragantino	9	(1)
2018	Votuporanguense	11	(5)
2018	Vila Nova	7	(0)
2018–2021	Gwangju	79	(41)
2021–	Chengdu Rongcheng	147	(80)
- * Club domestic league appearances and goals as of 8 November 2026

Felipe de Sousa Silva (born 3 April 1992), commonly known as Felipe, is a Brazilian footballer who currently plays as a forward for Chengdu Rongcheng F.C.

== Club career ==
=== Chengdu Rongcheng ===
On 2 August 2021, Felipe joined Chinese second tier football club Chengdu Rongcheng. He was part of the team as the club gained promotion to the top tier at the end of the 2021 league campaign.

== Career statistics ==
=== Club ===
As of match played 8 November 2026.

Appearances and goals by club, season and competition
Club	Season	League			State League		Cup		Continental		Other		Total	
Club	Season	Division	Apps	Goals	Apps	Goals	Apps	Goals	Apps	Goals	Apps	Goals	Apps	Goals
Guarani de Juazeiro	2012	—			0	0	—		—		—		0	0
Caxias	2015	Série C	4	1	3 (Note: Appearances in the Campeonato Gaúcho)	0	—		—		—		7	1
Ferroviária	2016	—			—		—		—		14 (Note: Appearances in the Copa Paulista)	6	14	6
Sertãozinho	2016	—			10 (Note: Appearances in the Campeonato Paulista A3)	3	—		—		—		10	3
Sertãozinho	2017	—			18 (Note: Appearances in the Campeonato Paulista A2)	8	—		—		—		18	8
Sertãozinho	Total		0	0	28	11	—		—		0	0	28	11
Bragantino	2017	Série C	9	1	—		—		—		—		9	1
Votuporanguense	2018	—			11	5	—		—		—		11	5
Bragantino	2018	Série B	7	0	—		—		—		—		7	0
Gwangju FC	2018	K League 2	15	7	—		—		—		—		15	7
Gwangju FC	2019	K League 2	27	19	—		0	0	—		—		27	19
Gwangju FC	2020	K League 1	24	12	—		0	0	—		—		24	12
Gwangju FC	2021	K League 1	13	3	—		0	0	—		—		13	3
Gwangju FC	Total		79	41	—		0	0	—		—		79	41
Chengdu Rongcheng	2021	China League One	18	12	—		0	0	—		2 (Note: Appearance(s) in CSL Relegation play-offs)	1	20	13
Chengdu Rongcheng	2022	Chinese Super League	21	7	—		0	0	—		—		21	7
Chengdu Rongcheng	2023	Chinese Super League	26	13	—		0	0	—		—		26	13
Chengdu Rongcheng	2024	Chinese Super League	30	15	—		3	2	—		—		33	17
Chengdu Rongcheng	2025	Chinese Super League	30	15	—		4	0	7	5	—		41	16
Chengdu Rongcheng	2026	Chinese Super League	22	18	—		1	2	2	1	—		24	19
Chengdu Rongcheng	Total		147	80	—		8	4	9	6	2	1	166	87
Career Total			246	123	42	16	8	4	9	6	16	7	321	156
