= Zhao Bo =

Chinese association football player

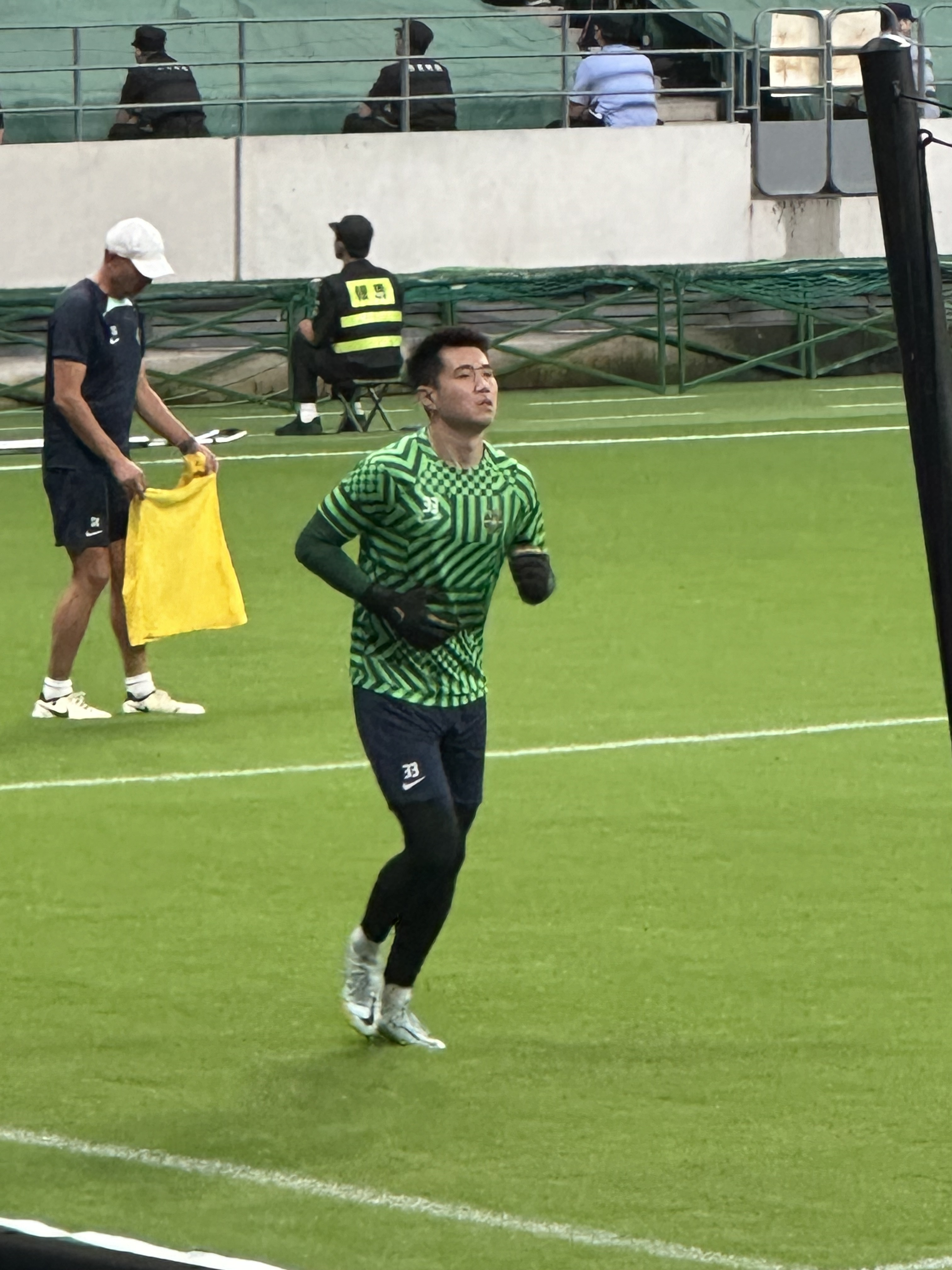
- Zhao Bo in August 2024

Personal information
- Date of birth: 17 September 1993 (age 33)
- Height: 1.89 m (6 ft 2 in)
- Position: Goalkeeper

Team information
- Current team: Zhejiang FC
- Number: 33

Youth career
- –2015: Guangzhou R&F
- 2016: Baoding Yingli ETS

Senior career*
Years	Team	Apps	(Gls)
2016–2018	Baoding Yingli ETS	43	(0)
2019–	Zhejiang FC	118	(0)
- * Club domestic league appearances and goals as of 19 November 2026

Zhao Bo (Chinese: 赵博; born 17 September 1993) is a Chinese professional footballer currently playing for Chinese Super League club Zhejiang FC as a goalkeeper.

== Club career ==
Zhao Bo would be promoted to the senior team of Baoding Yingli ETS in the 2016 China League Two season, where he established himself as a regular while the team gained promotion to the second tier. He would unfortunately be part of the team that was immediately relegated back into the third tier the following season. On 29 January 2019 he transferred to second tier club Zhejiang Professional as their second choice goalkeeper. He would eventually go on to make his debut in a league game against Jiangxi Beidamen on 4 October 2020 in a 2-0 victory. He would be a squad player as the club gained promotion to the top tier at the end of the 2021 campaign.

== Career statistics ==
As of 1 March 2026.

Club	Season	League			Cup		Continental		Other		Total	
Club	Season	Division	Apps	Goals	Apps	Goals	Apps	Goals	Apps	Goals	Apps	Goals
Baoding Yingli ETS	2016	China League Two	11	0	0	0	–		–		11	0
Baoding Yingli ETS	2017	China League One	12	0	0	0	–		–		12	0
Baoding Yingli ETS	2018	China League Two	20	0	0	0	–		–		20	0
Baoding Yingli ETS	Total		43	0	0	0	0	0	0	0	43	0
Zhejiang Greentown/ Zhejiang Professional	2019	China League One	0	0	0	0	–		–		0	0
Zhejiang Greentown/ Zhejiang Professional	2020	China League One	1	0	1	0	–		0 (Note: Appearances in Promotion/Relegation Play-offs)	0	2	0
Zhejiang Greentown/ Zhejiang Professional	2021	China League One	3	0	1	0	–		0	0	4	0
Zhejiang Greentown/ Zhejiang Professional	2022	Chinese Super League	10	0	5	0	–		–		15	0
Zhejiang Greentown/ Zhejiang Professional	2023	Chinese Super League	29	0	2	0	7 (Note: Appearances in 2023–24 AFC Champions League)	0	–		38	0
Zhejiang Greentown/ Zhejiang Professional	2024	Chinese Super League	22	0	0	0	5 (Note: Appearances in 2024–25 AFC Champions League Two)	0	–		27	0
Zhejiang Greentown/ Zhejiang Professional	2025	Chinese Super League	29	0	0	0	–		–		29	0
Zhejiang Greentown/ Zhejiang Professional	Total		94	0	9	0	12	0	0	0	115	0
Career total			137	0	9	0	12	0	0	0	158	0
