= Farley Rosa =

Brazilian footballer (born 1994)

Personal information
- Full name: Farley Vieira Rosa
- Date of birth: 14 January 1994 (age 32)
- Place of birth: Santo Antônio do Jacinto, Brazil
- Height: 1.74 m (5 ft 8 1/2 in)
- Position: Left winger

Team information
- Current team: Suzhou Dongwu
- Number: 7

Youth career
- 2005–2008: Cruzeiro
- 2008–2013: Sporting CP

Senior career*
Years	Team	Apps	(Gls)
2013–2014	Sevastopol	22	(1)
2014–2016	Monte Azul	0	(0)
2014–2015	→ Apollon Limassol (loan)	29	(1)
2016	→ AEK Larnaca (loan)	14	(0)
2016–2018	Panetolikos	49	(8)
2018–2019	Al-Ettifaq	8	(0)
2019–2020	Atromitos	14	(0)
2020	Panetolikos	14	(3)
2020–2021	Al-Fujairah	13	(3)
2021	Hapoel Be'er Sheva	11	(2)
2021–2022	Hapoel Tel Aviv	21	(4)
2022–2023	Tianjin Jinmen Tiger	57	(10)
2024	Daejeon Hana Citizen	7	(1)
2024	Nantong Zhiyun	14	(1)
2025	Guangdong GZ-Power	29	(15)
2026	Panetolikos	14	(3)
2026–	Suzhou Dongwu	0	(0)
- * Club domestic league appearances and goals as of 14 June 2026

Farley Vieira Rosa (born 14 January 1994) is a Brazilian professional footballer who plays as a left winger for China League One club Suzhou Dongwu.

== Club career ==
Farley Rosa is a product of the Sporting Clube de Portugal youth sportive school system. In July 2013 he signed a contract with the Ukrainian Premier League club FC Sevastopol. On 9 July 2016, Super League Greece club Panetolikos officially announced the signing of Rosa on a two-year contract. Despite coming usually as a substitute he finished the 2016–17 season having recorded five goals and six assists. He began the next season with some fluctuations in his performances, but after some time he became a very important part in the team's plans. On 26 November 2017, he sealed an anxious 3–1 home win against AEL, which was the first since matchday 6.

On 29 April 2022, Rosa signed with Chinese Super League club Tianjin Jinmen Tiger.

On 13 February 2024, Rosa signed with K League 1 club Daejeon Hana Citizen.

On 27 June 2024, Rosa signed with Chinese Super League club Nantong Zhiyun.

On 16 January 2026, Guangdong GZ-Power announced his departure after the 2025 season.

On 29 June 2026, Rosa returned to China and joined China League One club Suzhou Dongwu.

== Career statistics ==
As of match played 8 November 2025

Appearances and goals by club, season and competition
Club	Season	League			National cup		League cup		Continental		Total	
Club	Season	Division	Apps	Goals	Apps	Goals	Apps	Goals	Apps	Goals	Apps	Goals
Sevastopol	2013–14	Ukrainian Premier League	22	1	1	0	—		—		23	1
Apollon Limassol (loan)	2014–15	Cypriot First Division	24	1	2	0	—		3	1	29	2
Apollon Limassol (loan)	2015–16	Cypriot First Division	5	0	0	0	—		4	1	9	1
Apollon Limassol (loan)	Total		29	1	2	0	—		7	1	38	2
AEK Larnaca (loan)	2015–16	Cypriot First Division	14	0	5	1	—		—		19	1
Panetolikos	2016–17	Super League Greece	20	3	3	2	—		—		23	5
Panetolikos	2017–18	Super League Greece	29	5	5	1	—		—		34	6
Panetolikos	Total		49	8	8	3	—		—		57	11
Al-Ettifaq	2018–19	Saudi Professional League	8	0	0	0	—		—		8	0
Atromitos	2019–20	Super League Greece	14	0	0	0	—		4	0	18	0
Panetolikos	2019–20	Super League Greece	14	3	3	0	—		—		17	3
Al-Fujairah	2020–21	UAE Pro League	13	3	0	0	4	1	—		17	4
Hapoel Be'er Sheva	2020–21	Israeli Premier League	11	2	0	0	—		—		11	2
Hapoel Tel Aviv	2021–22	Israeli Premier League	21	4	1	0	—		—		25	4
Tianjin Jinmen Tiger	2022	Chinese Super League	28	2	0	0	—		—		28	2
Tianjin Jinmen Tiger	2023	Chinese Super League	29	8	2	0	—		—		31	8
Tianjin Jinmen Tiger	Total		57	10	2	0	—		—		59	10
Daejeon Hana Citizen	2024	K League 1	7	1	0	0	—		—		7	1
Nantong Zhiyun	2024	Chinese Super League	14	1	0	0	—		—		14	1
Guangdong GZ-Power	2025	China League One	29	15	2	0	—		—		31	15
Career total			302	49	24	4	4	1	11	1	341	55
