= Jiang Shenglong =

Chinese footballer (born 2000)

Jiang Shenglong 蒋圣龙
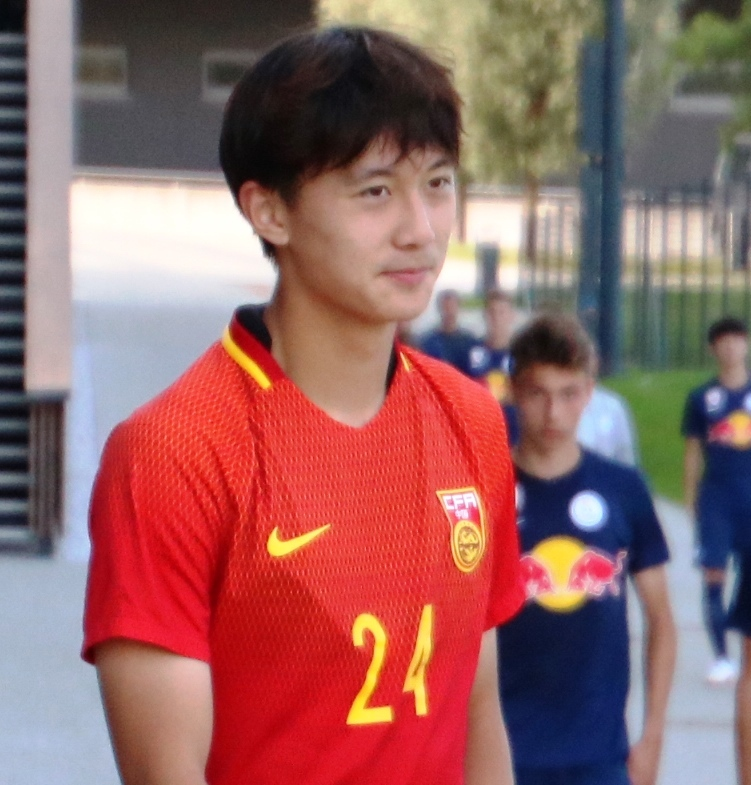
- Jiang playing for China U20 in 2018

Personal information
- Full name: Jiang Shenglong
- Date of birth: 24 December 2000 (age 25)
- Place of birth: Nanjing, Jiangsu, China
- Height: 1.93 m (6 ft 4 in)
- Position: Centre-back

Team information
- Current team: Shanghai Shenhua
- Number: 4

Youth career
- 2010: Beijing Guoan
- 2010–2017: Genbao Football Base
- 2017–2018: Shanghai Shenhua

Senior career*
Years	Team	Apps	(Gls)
2018–	Shanghai Shenhua	125	(11)
2020	→ Tianjin Teda (loan)	6	(0)
2021	→ Chongqing Liangjiang Athletic (loan)	19	(0)

International career^{‡}
2017–2018	China U19	17	(1)
2018–2023	China U23	4	(1)
2022–	China	23	(0)
Medal record
Representing China
Men's football
EAFF Championship
Bronze medal – third place	2022 Japan	Team
Bronze medal – third place	2025 South Korea	Team
- * Club domestic league appearances and goals as of 19 November ‡ National team caps and goals as of 9 January 2024

Jiang Shenglong (Chinese: 蒋圣龙; pinyin: Jiǎng Shènglóng; born 24 December 2000) is a Chinese professional footballer who plays as a centre-back for Chinese Super League club Shanghai Shenhua and the China national team.

== Club career ==
Jiang joined Chinese Super League side Shanghai Shenhua's youth academy in March 2018 when the club bought Genbao Football Base's under-19 players. He was promoted to the first team squad in the summer break of 2018. On 22 July 2018, Jiang made his senior debut in a 2–2 away draw against Henan Jianye, replacing Rong Hao in the 77th minute.

On 30 September 2020, Jiang was loaned out to fellow top tier club Tianjin TEDA to gain more playing time. His debut would be in a league game on 16 October 2020 against Shenzhen in a 2-0 victory. The following season, Jiang would be loaned out again to another top tier club in Chongqing Liangjiang Athletic on 8 April 2020 for the 2021 Chinese Super League campaign.

== International career ==
On 26 March 2019 he was selected as part of the Chinese U-23 team to participate for the qualification for the 2020 AFC U-23 Championship. He would make his debut on 26 March 2019 against Malaysia U-23 in a 2-2 draw, where he also scored his first goal for the team as China qualified for the tournament.

On 20 July 2022, Jiang made his international debut in a 3-0 defeat against South Korea in the 2022 EAFF E-1 Football Championship, as the Chinese FA decided to field the U-23 national team for this senior competition.

On 12 December 2023, Jiang was named in China's squad for the 2023 AFC Asian Cup in Qatar.

== Career statistics ==
=== Club ===
As of 9 January 2025

Appearances and goals by club, season and competition
Club	Season	League			National Cup		Continental		Other		Total	
Club	Season	Division	Apps	Goals	Apps	Goals	Apps	Goals	Apps	Goals	Apps	Goals
Shanghai Shenhua	2018	Chinese Super League	3	0	0	0	-		0 (Note: Appearances in Chinese FA Super Cup)	0	3	0
Shanghai Shenhua	2019	Chinese Super League	14	1	3	1	-		-		17	2
Shanghai Shenhua	2020	Chinese Super League	1	0	1	0	3	0	-		5	0
Shanghai Shenhua	2022	Chinese Super League	26	0	1	0	-		-		27	0
Shanghai Shenhua	2023	Chinese Super League	23	4	3	0	-		-		26	4
Shanghai Shenhua	2024	Chinese Super League	29	2	4	0	4	0	1	0	38	2
Shanghai Shenhua	Total		96	7	12	1	7	0	1	0	116	7
Tianjin TEDA (loan)	2020	Chinese Super League	6	0	0	0	-		-		6	0
Chongqing Liangjiang Athletic (loan)	2021	Chinese Super League	17	0	2	0	-		-		19	0
Career total			119	7	14	1	7	0	1	0	141	8

=== International ===
Appearances and goals by national team and year
National team	Year	Apps	Goals
China	2022	2	0
China	2023	3	0
China	2024	11	0
China	2025	5	0
China	2026	2	0
Total		23	0

== Honours ==
Shanghai Shenhua

- Chinese FA Cup: 2019, 2023
- Chinese FA Super Cup: 2024, 2025

Individual

- Chinese Super League Team of the Year: 2023, 2024
