= Li Tenglong =

Russian-Chinese footballer (born 2001)

Personal information
- Full name: Li Tenglong (Chinese); Lê Thành Long (Vietnamese)
- Date of birth: 6 January 2001 (age 25)
- Place of birth: Moscow, Russia
- Height: 1.81 m (5 ft 11 in)
- Position: Midfielder

Youth career
- 2007–2019: CSKA Moscow
- 2019–2021: Granada

Senior career*
Years	Team	Apps	(Gls)
2021–2022	Recreativo Granada	0	(0)
2022	→ Cubillas (loan)	8	(0)
2023–2024	Henan FC	4	(0)

International career
2019	China U18		
2018	China U19		
2022	China U21		
- * Club domestic league appearances and goals as of 17:14, 21 October 2023 (UTC)

Li Tenglong (Chinese: 黎腾龙; born 6 January 2001) is a footballer who plays as a midfielder. Born in Russia, he is a youth international for China.

== Club career ==
Li was born in Moscow, Russia to a Chinese mother from Xi'an and a Vietnamese father. He joined Russian Premier League side CSKA Moscow in 2007, and stayed with the club for twelve years. He moved to Spain and joined Granada in February 2019, but in May of the same year, he suffered a fracture in his left leg, keeping him out for the majority of the season. He was promoted to the club's 'B' team, Recreativo Granada, in 2020, but suffered another injury in May 2021, this time to his right leg, and missed another season.

He returned to footballing action in February 2022, when he was loaned to sixth-tier FC Cubillas.

== International career ==
Li's mother made sure he retained his Chinese citizenship. He has been approached by both the Russian and Vietnamese footballing associations to represent each nation. He was first called up to the China youth teams in 2018, playing at the Weifang Cup, despite being two years younger than his compatriots. He was called up to the under-21 squad in 2022, his first call-up in three years.

== Career statistics ==
=== Club ===
As of 21 October 2023

Club	Season	League			Cup		Continental		Other		Total	
Club	Season	Division	Apps	Goals	Apps	Goals	Apps	Goals	Apps	Goals	Apps	Goals
Recreativo Granada	2020–21	Segunda División B	0	0	–		–		0	0	0	0
Recreativo Granada	2021–22	Segunda División RFEF	0	0	–		–		0	0	0	0
Recreativo Granada	Total		0	0	0	0	0	0	0	0	0	0
Cubillas (loan)	2021–22	División de Honor Andaluza	8	0	0	0	–		0	0	8	0
Henan FC	2023	Chinese Super League	2	0	0	0	–		0	0	2	0
Career total			10	0	0	0	0	0	0	0	10	0
