= Milan Ristić (football manager) =

Serbian football manager (born 1981)

Personal information
- Date of birth: 10 June 1981 (age 45)
- Place of birth: Belgrade, SR Serbia, SFR Yugoslavia
- Height: 1.88 m (6 ft 2 in)

Managerial career
- Years: Team
- 2016–2019: FK Teleoptik
- 2019–2020: FK Zemun
- 2021–2023: Meizhou Hakka
- 2024–2025: Meizhou Hakka
- 2026: Qingdao Hainiu

Milan Ristić (Serbian Cyrillic: Милан Ристић; born 10 June 1981) is a Serbian professional football manager.

== Career ==
On 3 February 2021, Ristić was appointed as head coach of China League One club Meizhou Hakka. In the same year, Ristić won promotion to the Chinese Super League with Meizhou Hakka, finishing in second place in the 2021 season. In Meizhou Hakka's first two seasons as a Chinese Super League side, Ristić guided the club to a ninth-place finish in the 2022 season and an eleventh-place finish in the 2023 season, surviving relegation. After the 2023 season, Ristić left the club after the expiry of his contract. On 12 June 2024, he re-signed with Meizhou Hakka.

On 27 December 2025, Ristić was appointed as head coach of Chinese Super League club Qingdao Hainiu. On 6 November 2026, the club has announced Ristić's departure after the 2026 season.
