= Dai Wai Tsun =

Chinese footballer (born 1999)

Dai Weijun 戴伟浚
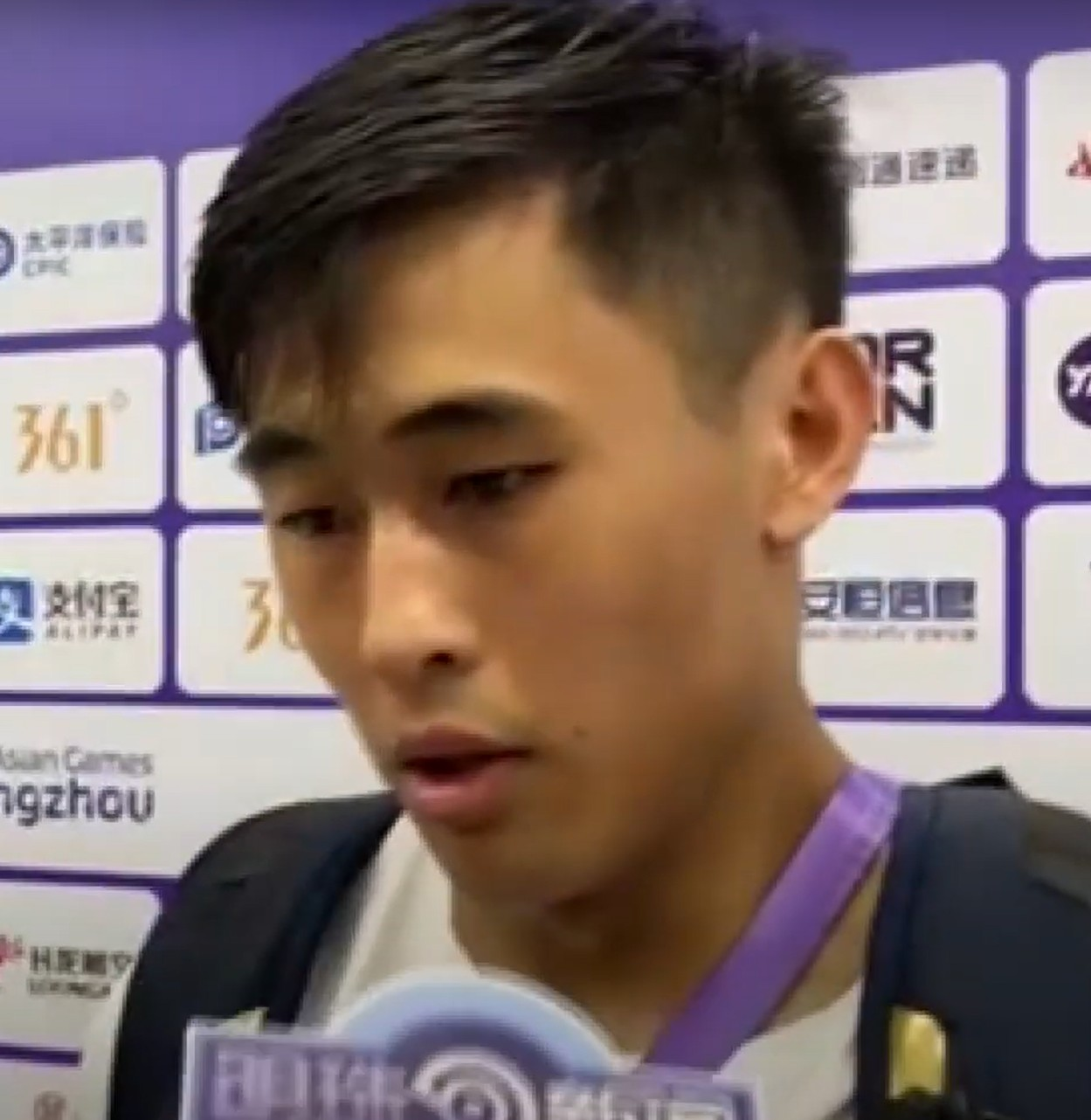
- Dai in September 2023

Personal information
- Full name: Dai Weijun
- Birth name: Dai Wai Tsun
- Date of birth: 25 July 1999 (age 27)
- Place of birth: Hong Kong
- Height: 1.75 m (5 ft 9 in)
- Positions: Central midfielder; winger

Team information
- Current team: Shenzhen Peng City
- Number: 10

Youth career
- 2007–2009: Eastern
- 2009–2012: Kitchee
- 2012–2016: Reading
- 2016–2017: Bury

Senior career*
| Years | Team | Apps | (Gls) |
| 2017–2018 | Bury | 8 | (0) |
| 2018–2019 | Oxford United | 0 | (0) |
| 2019 | → Jong FC Utrecht (loan) | 12 | (0) |
| 2019–2020 | Wolverhampton Wanderers | 0 | (0) |
| 2020–2023 | Shenzhen FC | 56 | (6) |
| 2023–2025 | Shanghai Shenhua | 25 | (0) |
| 2024 | → Shenzhen Peng City (loan) | 10 | (1) |
| 2026– | Shenzhen Peng City | 24 | (3) |

International career^{‡}
| 2012–2013 | Hong Kong U15 | | |
| 2022–2023 | China U23 | | |
| 2022– | China | 18 | (0) |
Medal record
Representing China
Men's football
EAFF Championship
| Bronze medal – third place | 2022 Japan | Team |
Chinese name
| Simplified Chinese | 戴伟浚 |
| Traditional Chinese | 戴偉浚 |
| Cantonese Yale | Daai Wáihjeun |
Transcriptions Standard Mandarin: Hanyu Pinyin: Dài Wěijùn; Yue: Cantonese: Yale Romanization: Daai Wáihjeun
- * Club domestic league appearances and goals as of 22 November 2026 ‡ National team caps and goals as of 20 June 2026

Dai Wai Tsun (Chinese: 戴偉浚; Jyutping: Daai3 Wai5 Zeon3; Cantonese Yale: Daai Wáihjeun, born 25 July 1999), also spelled in Mandarin as Dai Weijun (Chinese: 戴伟浚; pinyin: Dài Wěijùn), is a professional footballer who plays as a midfielder for Chinese Super League club Shenzhen Peng City. Born in Hong Kong, he represents the China national team.

== Early life ==
Dai was born in Hong Kong and was inspired to play football by his father who once played for Hong Kong's youth teams. He started playing the sport at the young age of 4, joining Eastern's youth system for a chance to become an international footballer. Dai later joined the Hong Kong Barcelona Football academy and trained with players born in 2000.

At first, he played in a defensive midfield position and was placed under the spotlight, and was often the captain as he showed his leadership skills on the pitch. He has participated in youth matches with Hong Kong Barcelona Football Academy in Spain and Poland, and his father's support was a major factor of his youth success compared with his peers. He moved to England for a chance to get training of a higher quality, and joined the Reading youth team and enrolled in Hall Grove School and then Bradfield College.

He was also called up multiple times to the Hong Kong youth squads while in England, and played in multiple international youth competitions.

== Career ==
=== Bury ===
After leaving Reading, he was invited by Bury for a trial and joined the Bury youth system under the name Tsun Dai.

==== 2017–18 season ====
After the 2016–17 season, Bury announced that 11 players were leaving the club, but gave Dai his first professional contract and the number 25 shirt, making him the second Hong Kong footballer to sign a contract with an English team. His first game for Bury was a pre-season start against Sunderland on 8 July 2017. He helped build the second goal for Bury that allowed them to lead 2–1 before half-time, albeit not being credited with an assist. He was substituted off in the second half, and the match ended 3–2 to Sunderland. Bury manager, Lee Clark, stated that he was satisfied with Dai's performance and that he had vast potential.

On 16 July, he played his second game coming off the bench against Huddersfield Town and earned a lot of compliment for his outstanding performance. His third match and second start for Bury was against Macclesfield, and played the entire match. Although the team lost 1–0, Dai's performance further improved and impressed both the coaches of Bury and the opponent. He received a 3-year extension to his contract, which would now last to 2020.

Dai made his first league appearance for Bury on 5 August 2017 in a 1–0 win against Walsall, coming on as a substitute in the 60th minute. In doing so, he became the second Hong Kong footballer to appear in an English professional match and the first to do so in 55 years. Dai made his first competitive start for Bury five days later in a 1–0 defeat to Sunderland in the First Round of 2017–18 EFL Cup.

Dai scored his first career goal for Bury as a consolation goal during their EFL Trophy tie against Fleetwood Town.

=== Oxford United ===
Dai signed for Oxford United on 9 August 2018, for an undisclosed fee, on a two-year contract. He was sold to Wolverhampton Wanderers a year later, again for an undisclosed fee, without having made a first-team appearance for Oxford.

=== FC Utrecht ===
On 30 January 2019, Dai was loaned to FC Utrecht until the end of the season. He made 12 appearances for the club in the second half of the season and recorded two assists.

=== Wolverhampton Wanderers ===
On 10 July 2019, Dai joined Premier League side Wolverhampton Wanderers Under-23s for an undisclosed fee, signing a two-year contract with the option of a further 12 months. He made his under-23 debut as an 87th-minute substitute in a Premier League 2 fixture against Brighton under-23s on 13 August 2019.

=== Shenzhen F.C. ===
On 16 July 2020, Wolverhampton Wanderers announced that Dai had completed a move to Chinese Super League side Shenzhen FC He played in the first two matches of the 2020 CSL, starting in the first game and came on as substitute in the second. On 29 August 2020, Dai scored the first goal for the club in a 2–0 win against Guangzhou R&F. He was entangled in an arbitration of contract dispute with the club and didn't play for them during the first half of the 2023 Chinese Super League season.

=== Shanghai Shenhua ===
On 28 June 2023, Dai joined fellow Chinese Super League club Shanghai Shenhua on a free transfer. On 4 January 2026, Dai announced his departure after the 2025 season.

=== Shenzhen Peng City ===
On 4 January 2026, Dai joined Chinese Super League club Shenzhen Peng City.

== International career ==
Dai held both a Hong Kong and British passport, and was therefore eligible to represent Hong Kong or England internationally.

In September 2018, Dai was called up to the preliminary squad of the Hong Kong national team. Although it was initially reported that he had declined a Hong Kong call up due to injury, he later accepted a call up during the same window to a China under-21 training camp led by Guus Hiddink in Amsterdam, Netherlands. Two weeks after the camp, Hong Kong manager Gary White once again named Dai in his preliminary squad for the 2019 EAFF E-1 Football Championship qualifiers. Following good performances in the Chinese Super League, it was reported in August 2020 that Shenzhen F.C. had begun assisting Dai with his (mainland) Chinese naturalisation application, and that Dai himself wanted to be called up for the China national football team. In September 2020, he admitted in an interview that "if I had the opportunity to represent the Chinese team, I would be very honoured. My application is being processed and the club are helping me."

On 27 January 2022, Dai made his international debut for China against Japan in the 2022 World Cup qualifier as a substitute at the 64th minute.

Dai was named in China's squad for the 2023 AFC Asian Cup in Qatar and started the team's opening match against Tajikistan on 13 January 2024.

Dai was recalled by the national team in 2026 season, after recovered from his knee injury.

== Personal life ==
His father, Dai Man Hong, is the director of Hong Kong Premier League club Eastern and member of Technical and Playing Committee of the HKFA. Dai has also played for Eastern's youth squad and has supported the club since a young age. he has stated that if he ever has the chance to return to play in his native Hong Kong, he would only play for Eastern.

== Career statistics ==
=== Club ===
Statistics accurate as of match played 7 July 2023.

Appearances and goals by club, season and competition
| Club | Season | League | | | National Cup | | League Cup | | Continental | | Other | | Total | |
| Club | Season | Division | Apps | Goals | Apps | Goals | Apps | Goals | Apps | Goals | Apps | Goals | Apps | Goals |
|---|---|---|---|---|---|---|---|---|---|---|---|---|---|---|
| Bury | 2017–18 | EFL League One | 8 | 0 | 0 | 0 | 1 | 0 | — | | 2 (Note: Appearances in EFL Trophy) | 1 | 11 | 1 |
| Oxford United | 2018–19 | EFL League One | 0 | 0 | 0 | 0 | 0 | 0 | — | | 0 | 0 | 0 | 0 |
| Jong FC Utrecht (loan) | 2018–19 | Eerste Divisie | 12 | 0 | — | | — | | — | | — | | 12 | 0 |
| Wolverhampton Wanderers U-23 | 2019–20 | PL 2, Div 1 | 5 | 0 | — | | — | | — | | — | | 5 | 0 |
| Wolverhampton Wanderers U-21 | 2019–20 | PL PDL, National Div | 0 | 0 | — | | — | | — | | 2 | 1 | 2 | 1 |
| Shenzhen FC | 2020 | Chinese Super League | 17 | 1 | 0 | 0 | — | | — | | — | | 17 | 1 |
| Shenzhen FC | 2021 | Chinese Super League | 19 | 3 | 4 | 0 | — | | — | | — | | 23 | 3 |
| Shenzhen FC | 2022 | Chinese Super League | 20 | 2 | 0 | 0 | — | | — | | — | | 20 | 2 |
| Shenzhen FC | 2023 | Chinese Super League | 0 | 0 | 0 | 0 | — | | — | | — | | 0 | 0 |
| Shenzhen FC | Total | | 56 | 6 | 4 | 0 | — | | — | | — | | 60 | 6 |
| Shanghai Shenhua | 2023 | Chinese Super League | 2 | 0 | 0 | 0 | — | | — | | — | | 2 | 0 |
| Career total | | | 83 | 6 | 4 | 0 | 1 | 0 | 0 | 0 | 4 | 2 | 92 | 8 |

=== International statistics ===
National team
| Year | Apps | Goals |
|---|---|---|
| 2022 | 7 | 3 |
| 2023 | 4 | 0 |
| 2024 | 3 | 0 |
| 2026 | 4 | 0 |
| Total | 18 | 0 |

== Honours ==
Shanghai Shenhua

- Chinese FA Cup: 2023
