= Kyle Anderson (basketball) =

American-Chinese basketball player (born 1993)

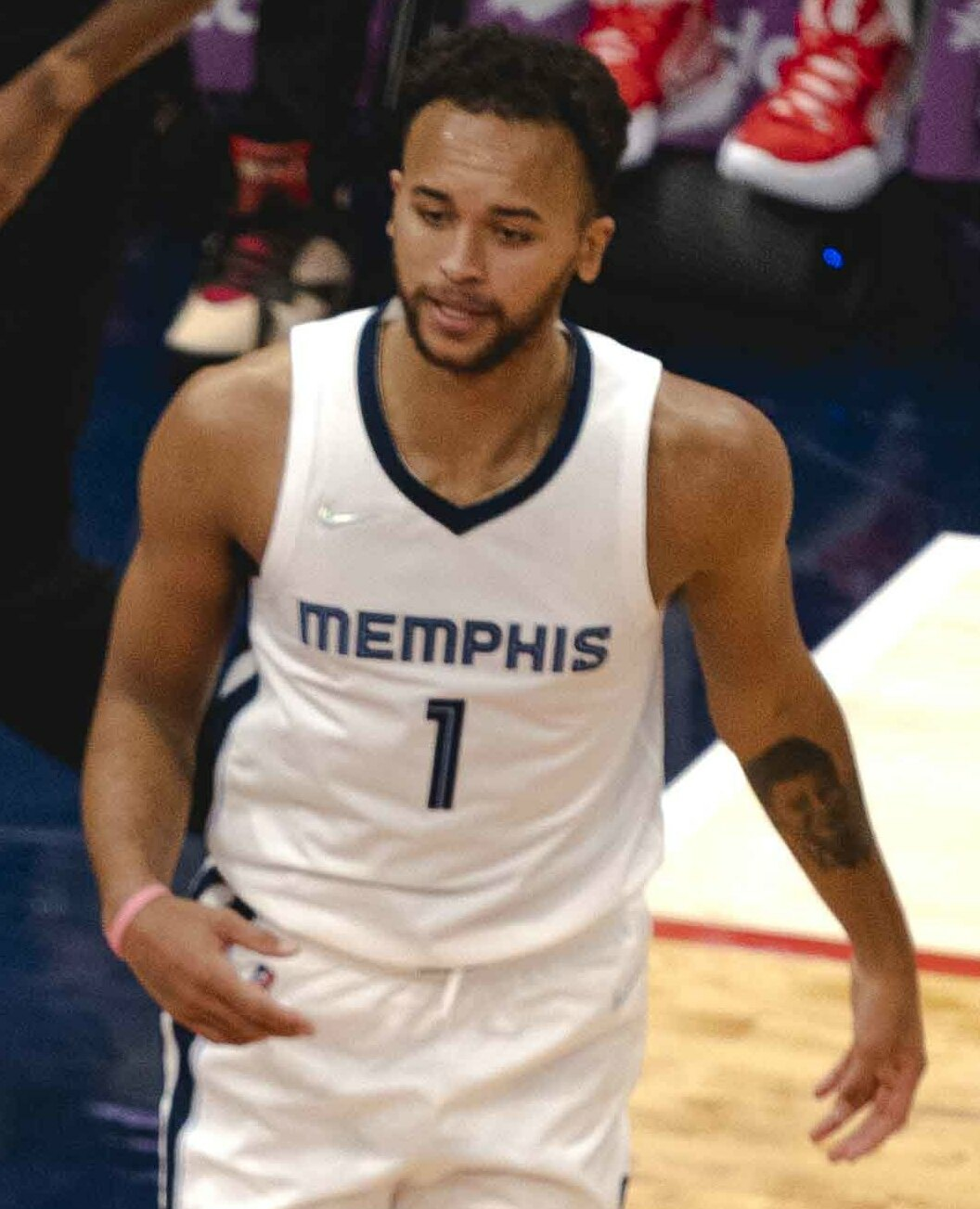
- Anderson with the Memphis Grizzlies in 2021

No. 13 – Toronto Raptors
- Position: Power forward / small forward
- League: NBA

Personal information
- Born: September 20, 1993 (age 33) New York City, New York, U.S.
- Listed height: 6 ft 8 in (2.03 m)
- Listed weight: 230 lb (104 kg)

Career information
- High school: Paterson Catholic (Paterson, New Jersey); St. Anthony (Jersey City, New Jersey)
- College: UCLA (2012–2014)
- NBA draft: 2014: 1st round, 30th overall pick
- Drafted by: San Antonio Spurs
- Playing career: 2014–present

Career history
- 2014–2018: San Antonio Spurs
- 2014–2015: →Austin Spurs
- 2018–2022: Memphis Grizzlies
- 2022–2024: Minnesota Timberwolves
- 2024–2025: Golden State Warriors
- 2025: Miami Heat
- 2025–2026: Utah Jazz
- 2026: Memphis Grizzlies
- 2026: Minnesota Timberwolves
- 2026–present: Toronto Raptors

Career highlights
- Third-team All-American – AP, SN (2014); First-team All-Pac-12 (2014); Second-team All-Pac-12 (2013); Pac-12 tournament MOP (2014); McDonald's All-American (2012); First-team Parade All-American (2012); MaxPreps National Basketball Player of the Year (2012)
- Stats at NBA.com
- Stats at Basketball Reference

Kyle Forman Anderson (born September 20, 1993), also known as Li Kai'er (Note: In this Chinese name, the family name is Li.) (simplified Chinese: 李凯尔; traditional Chinese: 李凱爾; pinyin: Lǐ Kǎi'ěr), is an American and Chinese professional basketball player for the Toronto Raptors of the National Basketball Association (NBA). Born in the United States, he played college basketball for the UCLA Bruins. After earning All-American honors as a sophomore in 2013–14, he declared for the 2014 NBA draft and was selected in the first round with the 30th overall pick by the San Antonio Spurs.

Nicknamed "Slow Mo", Anderson developed the ball-handling skills of a point guard at an early age, but his height provided him the versatility to play as a forward. As a high school player in New Jersey, Anderson led his teams to two consecutive state titles, and was named state player of the year during his senior year. One of the top recruits out of high school, Anderson was named second-team all-conference in the Pac-12 as a freshman at UCLA while playing mostly at forward. The following season, he moved to point guard, and was voted the Most Outstanding Player of the Pac-12 tournament as the Bruins won their first conference tournament title in six years. He played four seasons with San Antonio before signing with the Memphis Grizzlies in 2018. After four seasons with the Grizzlies, he signed with the Minnesota Timberwolves. Anderson has also played for the Golden State Warriors, Utah Jazz, and Miami Heat.

In 2023, Anderson became a naturalized Chinese citizen and played for their national team in the FIBA Basketball World Cup.

== Early life ==
Anderson was born on September 20, 1993, in New York City, and grew up in Fairview. He attended his first basketball camp at the age of three. Anderson's father, who played basketball at Glassboro State College (now Rowan University) and became a longtime high school coach in New Jersey, groomed him to be a point guard. Although Anderson was tall, his father did not want him to be "pigeonholed" as a post player. He had his son play with older players on Amateur Athletic Union (AAU) teams; usually the smallest player on the court, Anderson developed point guard skills early while passing to his larger teammates.

He began his high school career at Paterson Catholic High School. Although he possessed the skills of a point guard, his 6-foot-5-inch (1.96 m) height led coaches to play him on the wing or in the post. After two years at Paterson Catholic, the school closed, and Anderson moved to St. Anthony High School. Overall, he compiled 119–6 record as a four-year starter, including 65–0 in his two years at St. Anthony. When St. Anthony captured its second straight New Jersey Tournament of champions title and concluded its second straight undefeated season with a 66–62 victory over Plainfield, Anderson was the team's third-leading scorer with 14 points. Still, St. Anthony coach Bob Hurley said Anderson was the team's "heart and soul and he was the reason we won the game.’’ For the season, Anderson led the team in scoring (14.7 points per game), rebounding (6.5 per game), assists (3.9 per game), blocked shots (2.0 per game) and deflections. The Star-Ledger named him their state boys basketball Player of the Year. He received national recognition as a Parade All-American, McDonald's All-American, and he was invited to play in the Jordan Brand Classic and Nike Hoop Summit. In spite of all the praise he had received in his career, Anderson was described by Hurley as "unassuming", which the coach credited to Anderson's family doing a "great job keeping him balanced."

The 6-foot-8-inch (2.03 m) Anderson was often listed as a small forward, but still considered himself a point guard. Among 2012 recruits, he was ranked the No. 1 small forward by Rivals.com, and No. 2 by ESPN.com and Scout.com behind Shabazz Muhammad. Hurley called Anderson's passing "his best asset."

== College career ==
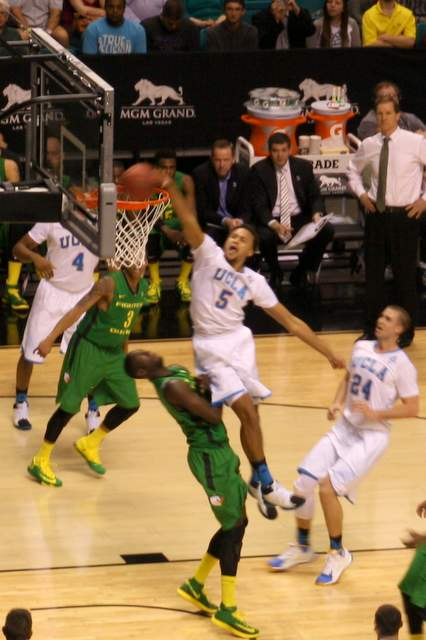
Anderson dunks against Oregon during the 2014 Pac-12 tournament

Anderson committed on September 19, 2011, to attending University of California, Los Angeles (UCLA) to play Division I basketball for the Bruins. He had also considered Seton Hall, Georgetown, Florida and St. John's. A major factor in his decision was UCLA coach Ben Howland's record of grooming successful point guards in the National Basketball Association (NBA). Anderson and Muhammad were the top players in the Bruins' recruiting class, which was considered the best in the nation. Howland had Anderson mostly playing off the ball, while Larry Drew II was the Bruins' primary ball handler. Playing primarily as a power forward, Anderson finished the season with averages of 9.7 points, 8.6 rebounds and 3.5 assists. Though he struggled at times under Howland's strict offense, he led the team in rebounding and was the only player ranked in the top 10 in the Pac-12 in both rebounds and assists. He was the first Pac-12 player since UCLA's Bill Walton as a senior in 1973–74 to have at least 300 rebounds and 100 assists in the same season. Anderson was named to the All-Pac-12 second team and the Pac-12 All-Freshman team. Projected by NBA executives to be chosen in the first half of the second round of the 2013 NBA draft if he declared himself eligible, Anderson gave major consideration to leaving college.

Anderson decided to return to UCLA in 2013–14, which he and his family figured would be his final season in college. With a field goal percentage of just 41.6% during the previous season, he worked on improving his shooting from midrange and beyond during the offseason. New Bruins coach Steve Alford, who replaced the fired Howland, moved Anderson back to his natural position at point guard. Under Alford's new wide-open offense, he played more confidently and displayed an improved jump shot. On November 22, 2013, he had 13 points, 12 rebounds, and 11 assists in an 81–70 win over Morehead State; it was the school's first triple-double since Toby Bailey in 1995. On November 29, UCLA was co-champion of the Continental Tire Las Vegas Invitational with Missouri, and Anderson was named the tournament's MVP, as the Bruins started the season with a 7–0 record. On February 27, Anderson and Jordan Adams missed one game after being suspended for a violation of team rules. Anderson was honored as the Most Outstanding Player of the 2014 Pac-12 tournament, which UCLA won for their first conference tournament title in six years. In the championship game, Anderson contributed 21 points, 15 rebounds and five assists in a 75–71 upset of No. 4 nationally ranked Arizona. "I don’t know that I’ve ever seen [those numbers] and just one turnover for a point guard,” said Arizona coach Sean Miller of Anderson's performance.

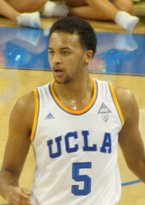
Anderson in 2014

Averaging 14.9 points, 8.7 rebounds, and 6.5 assists per game, Anderson was called "the nation's top triple-double threat" by the Orange County Register. He led the team in both rebounds and assists and was voted the team's most valuable player (MVP). Nationally, he ranked sixth in assists and first among power conference players. Anderson was also third in the Pac-12 in rebounds and steals (1.8) per game. He was the first player in Pac-12 history to register 200 rebounds and 200 assists in a season, as well as the first Division I player with at least 500 points, 300 rebounds and 200 assists in a season. (Note: Assists became an official NCAA statistic in 1983–84.) Anderson's field goal percentage improved by seven percentage points from his freshman year, while his three-point field goal percentage jump from 21 to 48 percent. The Associated Press and Sporting News named Anderson a third-team All-American, and he was voted to the All-Pac-12 first team as well as first team all-district by the National Association of Basketball Coaches (NABC) and the United States Basketball Writers Association (USBWA). He was a finalist for the Oscar Robertson Trophy, given by USBWA to the most outstanding college player; along with Shabazz Napier, they were the only players to also be on the midseason watchlists for the Naismith College Player of the Year, John R. Wooden Award, and Bob Cousy Award.

== Professional career ==
=== San Antonio Spurs (2014–2018) ===
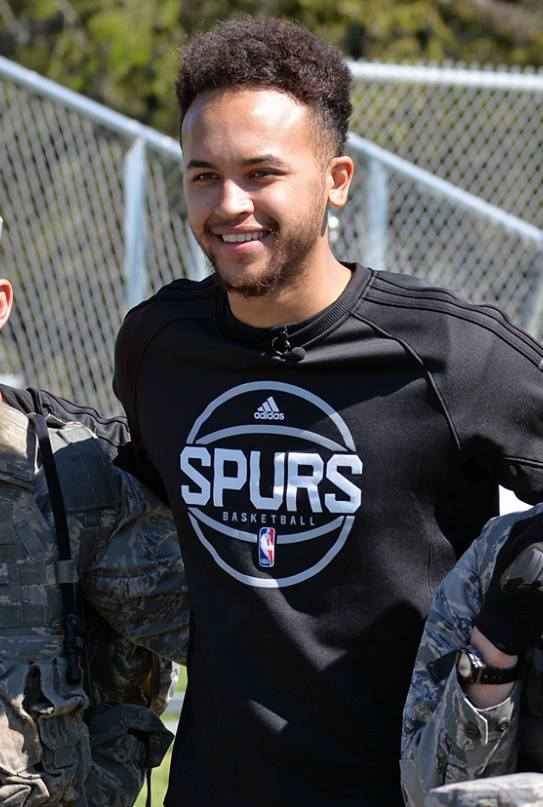
Anderson with the San Antonio Spurs in 2017

On April 16, 2014, Anderson announced that he would forgo his remaining collegiate eligibility and enter the 2014 NBA draft. While he disproved detractors who thought his style would not translate to success at the major college level, critics also said his lack of quickness would be an impediment in the NBA. Many teams projected him as a power forward, with some comparing him to Boris Diaw, a longtime NBA player with point forward skills who also plays at a leisurely pace.

Generally projected as a late first-round pick, Anderson was selected in the first round with the 30th overall pick of the draft by the San Antonio Spurs, who had recently won the 2014 NBA Finals. On July 12, 2014, he signed with the Spurs and joined them for the Las Vegas Summer League. In six summer league games, he spent most of the time on the wing with some minutes at power forward, but rarely as a point guard. Anderson began the 2014–15 season as the team's lone new player, with the rest of its championship roster intact. The Spurs often rested its starters, resulting in playing time for Anderson. He made his NBA debut four games into the season, playing a team-high 31 minutes in a 98–81 loss to the Houston Rockets, while coach Gregg Popovich rested veteran stars Tim Duncan and Manu Ginóbili in the second game of a back-to-back set for the Spurs. Anderson shot just 1-of-8, but displayed his skill set with eight rebounds, four assists and two steals; he also acted as San Antonio's primary ball handler during the fourth quarter. On December 10 with five Spurs out due to a combination of injuries or rest, Anderson made his first NBA start and scored nine points in a 109–95 win over the New York Knicks. He continued to receive playing time while starting small forward Kawhi Leonard remained out for an extended period with a hand injury.

During his rookie season, he has also had multiple assignments with the Austin Spurs of the NBA Development League. On February 9, he was named the D-League Performer of the Week. Austin went 2–0 that week, while Anderson logged back-to-back double-doubles and averaged 19.0 points, 11.0 rebounds, 5.5 assists and 1.5 blocks. He was named the NBA Development League Player of the Month for February, when he averaged 22.8 points, 8.8 rebounds, and 4.7 assists, leading Austin to an 8–1 record.

During the offseason, Anderson played with the Spurs in the 2015 NBA Summer League in Las Vegas. In seven games, he averaged 21.0 points and 6.0 rebounds in 27.3 minutes, and was named the league's MVP. He became a regular part of San Antonio's rotation in 2015–16, appearing in 78 games while averaging 16 minutes. On March 28, 2016, he played 36 minutes and recorded 13 points, seven assists, and four steals in a 101–87 win over the Memphis Grizzlies. He established career highs in minutes and assists. Anderson had a career-high 11 rebounds in 20 minutes off the bench in an April 7 loss to the Golden State Warriors. In the regular season finale, he had his first double-double in the NBA with 15 points and 10 rebounds, leading the short-handed Spurs to a 96–91 win over the Dallas Mavericks. He matched his career-high in points, while adding a career-best five steals.

Anderson participated in the Summer League again in 2016, and Spurs summer league coach Becky Hammon declared him the top player in the league. He averaged a league-high 23.7 points in three games in the Utah league, and followed up with averages of 18.5 points and six rebounds in two games in Las Vegas, when the Spurs sent him home after they were content he had nothing left to prove in the league. He played 72 games including 14 starts in 2016–17, but his overall performance regressed. The Spurs were eliminated from the playoffs in the Western Conference Finals, when Anderson scored a season-high 20 points and added seven rebounds and four steals in the season-ending Game 4 loss to Golden State. Without any Summer League commitments for the first time as a pro, Anderson wanted to build off of his Game 4 performance. Over the summer, he worked on finishing shots around the rim and getting in shape to be light enough to play at guard or small forward while also being strong enough to also play at power forward.

With Leonard out an extended period with a quadriceps injury, Anderson began 2017–18 as a starter. On November 20, 2017, he had 13 points and a career-high 10 assists in a 96–85 win over the Atlanta Hawks. At Oklahoma City on December 3, Anderson started at power forward in place of a resting LaMarcus Aldridge when he suffered a grade 1 strain to the medial collateral ligament (MCL) of his left knee in the third quarter. He was subsequently ruled out for an estimated two weeks. Through 23 games, Anderson had been averaging career highs of 8.9 points, six rebounds and three assists. Popovich expected him to remain in the regular rotation even after Leonard returned. Anderson returned to action after missing eight games. In March 2018, he was moved to power forward as the Spurs went to a smaller lineup with Aldridge at center and Pau Gasol moving to the bench. On March 19, he was the first NBA player in the season to be scoreless and yet still post a +30 plus–minus rating in an 89–75 win over the Warriors. With Leonard missing most of the season, Anderson made 67 starts and ended the season averaging career highs in minutes (26.7 per game), points (7.9), rebounds (5.4), assists (2.7), steals (1.6), blocks (0.8) and field goal percentage (52.7).

=== Memphis Grizzlies (2018–2022) ===
After the 2017–18 season, Anderson became a restricted free agent. He signed a four-year deal with the Grizzlies worth $37.2 million after the Spurs declined to match the offer sheet. Popovich said the figure was "beyond the pale for us", but he was happy for Anderson. The Grizzlies' interest was strengthened by Memphis assistant coach Chad Forcier, a former Spurs assistant who Popovich credited along with Chip Engelland for developing Anderson. Grizzlies general manager Chris Wallace called Anderson their "main target" in free agency, and vice president of basketball operations John Hollinger cited the value in his ballhandling and playmaking ability. Anderson's role as a point forward increased in his last year with San Antonio, who were 14–2 during his four years when he had five or more assists. On November 10, 2018, Anderson had eight points and a career-high 13 rebounds in a 112–106 overtime win over the Philadelphia 76ers. He followed up with a second straight game with 13 rebounds in a loss to the Utah Jazz. In his first return to San Antonio on November 21, Anderson had nine points and nine rebounds in a team-high 38 minutes in a 104–103 win over the Spurs. In January 2019, he missed two weeks with an ankle injury. He returned for two games before being sidelined beginning in February with a nagging shoulder injury. In April, he underwent thoracic outlet decompression surgery to address his right shoulder soreness and other affiliated symptoms. Anderson said doctors removed his top rib to free the nerve flow from his neck to his right hand. The operation required him to retrain himself to shoot again.

Anderson was still experiencing discomfort from the shoulder surgery as preseason began in 2019–20, and there were doubts on his health for the upcoming season. However, his recovery went well during the regular season. Under new Grizzlies head coach Taylor Jenkins's fast-paced system, Anderson played as both a starter and reserve while being used as a small forward, power forward and center.

In 2020–21, Anderson opened the season with double figures in rebounds in each of the first two games, including a career-high 14 rebounds while tying his personal best with 20 points against Atlanta on December 26, 2020. He logged consecutive 10+ rebound games for the second time in his career, and it was his first game with at least 20 points and 10 rebounds. In the following game against the Brooklyn Nets, Anderson had career highs of 28 points and four 3-pointers in a 116–111 overtime win after teammate Ja Morant was lost for the game with an ankle injury in the second quarter. It was the first time Anderson scored at least 20 points in consecutive games. On May 10, 2021, he logged a career-high four blocks as the team tied a franchise record with 19 blocks in 115–110 win over the New Orleans Pelicans, which clinched a spot for Memphis in the play-in tournament. During the season, Anderson made a team-high 69 starts, playing mostly at power forward for the first time in his career. He increased his 3-point shooting after having never made more than 24 in a season and only once shooting above 33.3% in any of his six previous years in the league. In the Grizzlies' first play-in game, he tied his career high of four blocks in a 100–96 win that eliminated the Spurs. In their playoff opener at Utah, he set a Memphis franchise single-game playoff record with six steals and added 14 points in 112–109 win over the top-seeded Jazz.

Anderson moved to the bench the following season after Memphis decided to emphasize Jaren Jackson Jr., coupled with their acquisition of Steven Adams. On March 3, 2022, Anderson had a career-high six steals against the Boston Celtics. In the first round of the 2022 playoffs against the Minnesota Timberwolves, he started the second half of Game 2, and entered the starting lineup in Game 3 in place of Adams. Anderson was the primary defender against Karl-Anthony Towns. Xavier Tillman became the starter in Game 4.

=== Minnesota Timberwolves (2022–2024) ===
On July 8, 2022, Anderson signed a two-year, $18 million contract with the Minnesota Timberwolves. On December 9, Anderson scored 15 points and recorded a season-high 12 assists during a 118–108 win against the Utah Jazz.

On April 9, 2023, during a win against the New Orleans Pelicans, Anderson was involved in an altercation with his teammate, Rudy Gobert. Gobert struck Anderson after a verbal exchange, resulting in Gobert being escorted off the court. Gobert did not return to the game, and was later sent home from the locker room. In his first season with the Timberwolves, Anderson averaged 9.4 points, 5.3 rebounds and 4.9 assists per game.

=== Golden State Warriors (2024–2025) ===
On July 6, 2024, Anderson signed a three-year, $27 million contract with the Golden State Warriors via sign-and-trade as part of a six-team trade also including the Philadelphia 76ers, Dallas Mavericks, Denver Nuggets and Charlotte Hornets, which became the NBA's first six-team transaction. Anderson made 36 appearances (three starts) for Golden State, averaging 5.3 points, 3.1 rebounds, and 2.3 assists.

=== Miami Heat (2025) ===
On February 6, 2025, Anderson was traded to the Miami Heat in a five-team trade, including Jimmy Butler being sent to the Warriors. In 25 appearances (including one start) for Miami, he logged averages of 6.7 points, 3.8 rebounds, and 2.6 assists.

=== Utah Jazz (2025–2026) ===
On July 7, 2025, Anderson was traded to the Utah Jazz in a three-team trade that also involved the Los Angeles Clippers. Anderson played in 20 games for the Jazz during the 2025–26 NBA season, averaging 7.1 points, 3.3 rebounds, and 3.1 assists.

=== Returns to Memphis and Minnesota (2026) ===
On February 3, 2026, Anderson, Walter Clayton Jr., Taylor Hendricks, Georges Niang, and three first-round draft picks were traded to the Grizzlies in exchange for Jaren Jackson Jr., John Konchar, Jock Landale, and Vince Williams Jr.

On February 26, 2026, Anderson was waived by the Grizzlies. Later that day, he announced plans to sign with the Timberwolves for the remainder of the season. In his short return to Memphis, Anderson would see himself play four games – starting in 3 of them – for averages of 9.3 points, 3.5 rebounds, and 0.8 assists.

=== Toronto Raptors (2026–present) ===
On July 2, 2026, Anderson signed a one-year minimum deal with the Toronto Raptors.

== National team career ==
Anderson participated in U16 and U17 training camps for USA Basketball prior to being named to the 2009–10 USA Basketball Men's Developmental National Team. In 2012, he started at power forward for the USA Basketball Junior National Select Team that competed at the Nike Hoop Summit, which featured the top American high school seniors against a team of international players aged 19 or younger.

In 2023, Anderson said that he would consider playing for the Chinese national team. On July 24, 2023, the Chinese Basketball Association announced that he had obtained Chinese citizenship in advance of the 2023 FIBA Basketball World Cup.

== Player profile ==
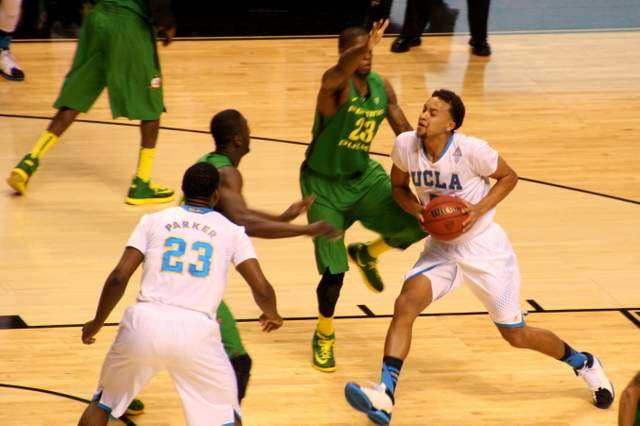
Anderson is nicknamed "Slow Mo" after his deliberate style.

Out of high school, Anderson was considered capable of playing any of four positions on the court, from point guard to power forward, drawing comparisons to basketball legend Magic Johnson. Anderson's high school coach Bob Hurley said, "I think he's a modern-day Magic Johnson. I think that let him play the point. He gets everybody shots. You don’t have him back defensively balancing the floor, you’re wasting him. But you let him do a lot of what the point guard stuff entails. But then also defensively you don’t bother guarding him on the little guy. Put him on maybe the three man or even sometimes the four man if he’s a step-out player." During his sophomore year in UCLA, CBSSports.com wrote that Anderson was "starting to look more and more like the Magic Johnson of the 2013–14 season in college basketball." ESPN analyst Dick Vitale warned against calling him the next Magic Johnson, but stated that "he has the mini-version of that kind of skill.” USA Today commented that he was "kind of a poor man's Magic Johnson".

The Seattle Times called Anderson the "[m]ost versatile player in years in the Pac-12." In 2014, SI.com said he "[m]ight be the most versatile player in the country." Rarely has a player of Anderson's stature—standing 6 feet 9 inches (2.06 m) with a wingspan of 7 feet 3 inches (2.21 m)—been entrusted to run the offense of a college team. He was a unique talent with a size advantage to post up smaller defenders down low, and the ball-handling skills to run the offense from the top of the key. He was comfortable playing both in the post and on the perimeter, and could direct the offense as either a point guard or point forward. One of the top rebounding guards in college, Anderson was the rare point guard that could rebound the ball and single-handedly initiate a fast break. He was often described as a "nightmare" matchup for opponents.

Anderson plays at a deliberate pace, and he is not as fast as more athletically gifted players. Popovich stated that he is "not what you’d call a typical NBA athlete". However, Anderson is praised for his basketball IQ. He is able to change speeds and fake out his opponents to keep them off balance. His methodical style earned him the nickname "Slow Mo" in eighth grade in AAU, and the name has stuck with him. "[He] really understands how to use his speed—he's not super fast, but he's super bright and really knows how to use angles," said Kevin Boyle, who coached Anderson on the national team in 2012. USA Today described him as "languid but quick enough to lead the fast break". Anderson's defense was considered a weakness. In college, his teams usually played zone as he struggled containing smaller, quicker guards while playing man-to-man. His defense improved with the Spurs in 2017–18, when he guarded both forward positions while leveraging his wingspan and instincts. Against quicker small forwards, he uses his physicality to keep players off balance.

== Career statistics ==
Legend
GP	Games played	GS	Games started	MPG	Minutes per game
FG%	Field goal percentage	3P%	3-point field goal percentage	FT%	Free throw percentage
RPG	Rebounds per game	APG	Assists per game	SPG	Steals per game
BPG	Blocks per game	PPG	Points per game	**Bold**	Career high

=== NBA ===
==== Regular season ====
Year	Team	GP	GS	MPG	FG%	3P%	FT%	RPG	APG	SPG	BPG	PPG
2014–15	San Antonio	33	8	10.9	.348	.273	.643	2.2	.8	.5	.2	2.2
2015–16	San Antonio	78	11	16.0	.468	.324	.747	3.1	1.6	.8	.4	4.5
2016–17	San Antonio	72	14	14.2	.445	.375	**.789**	2.9	1.3	.7	.4	3.4
2017–18	San Antonio	74	67	26.7	.527	.333	.712	5.4	2.7	**1.6**	.8	7.9
2018–19	Memphis	43	40	**29.8**	.543	.265	.578	**5.8**	3.0	1.3	.9	8.0
2019–20	Memphis	67	28	19.8	.474	.282	.667	4.3	2.4	.8	.6	5.8
2020–21	Memphis	69	**69**	27.4	.468	.360	.783	5.7	3.6	1.2	.8	**12.4**
2021–22	Memphis	69	11	21.5	.446	.330	.638	5.3	2.7	1.1	.7	7.6
2022–23	Minnesota	69	46	28.4	.509	.410	.735	5.3	**4.9**	1.1	.9	9.4
2023–24	Minnesota	**79**	10	22.6	.460	.229	.708	3.5	4.2	.9	.6	6.4
2024–25	Golden State	36	3	15.0	.450	.365	.667	3.1	2.3	.7	.6	5.3
2024–25	Miami	25	1	18.4	.493	.333	**.789**	3.8	2.6	.6	.5	6.7
2025–26	Utah	20	0	20.1	.523	.600	.658	3.3	3.1	1.2	.5	7.1
2025–26	Memphis	4	3	22.3	**.789**	**1.000**	.750	3.5	.8	1.5	**1.0**	9.3
2025–26	Minnesota	19	2	19.1	.473	.000	.773	3.7	3.3	.8	.6	4.6
Career		757	313	21.4	.480	.340	.715	4.2	2.8	1.0	.6	6.8

==== Playoffs ====
Year	Team	GP	GS	MPG	FG%	3P%	FT%	RPG	APG	SPG	BPG	PPG
2016	San Antonio	10	0	12.9	.320	**.333**	.857	2.4	.7	.6	.3	2.3
2017	San Antonio	**15**	1	13.0	.571	.300	.727	3.1	1.7	.7	.1	5.5
2018	San Antonio	5	1	14.7	**.600**	.000	.750	2.6	.6	1.2	.2	5.4
2021	Memphis	5	**5**	**28.4**	.429	.250	.750	**5.0**	3.2	**2.8**	.0	8.4
2022	Memphis	12	1	18.4	.569	.250	.611	4.3	1.8	.9	**.6**	6.0
2023	Minnesota	4	0	25.9	.500	**.333**	**1.000**	4.0	**4.5**	1.8	.5	**8.5**
2024	Minnesota	**15**	1	15.4	.456	.250	.833	2.7	2.5	.7	.3	4.3
2025	Miami	2	0	7.0	.000	–	–	.5	.5	.0	.0	.0
2026	Minnesota	8	0	7.6	.353	.000	.375	.9	1.9	.3	.0	1.9
Career		76	9	15.4	.487	.250	.697	2.9	1.9	.9	.3	4.7

=== College ===
Year	Team	GP	GS	MPG	FG%	3P%	FT%	RPG	APG	SPG	BPG	PPG
2012–13	UCLA	35	34	29.9	.416	.211	.735	8.6	3.5	**1.8**	**.9**	9.7
2013–14	UCLA	**36**	**36**	**33.2**	**.480**	**.483**	**.737**	**8.8**	**6.5**	**1.8**	.8	**14.6**
Career		71	70	31.6	.452	.375	.736	8.7	5.0	1.8	.8	12.2

== Accomplishments and awards ==
NBA

- Las Vegas Summer League MVP (2015)
- All-NBA Las Vegas Summer League First Team (2015)

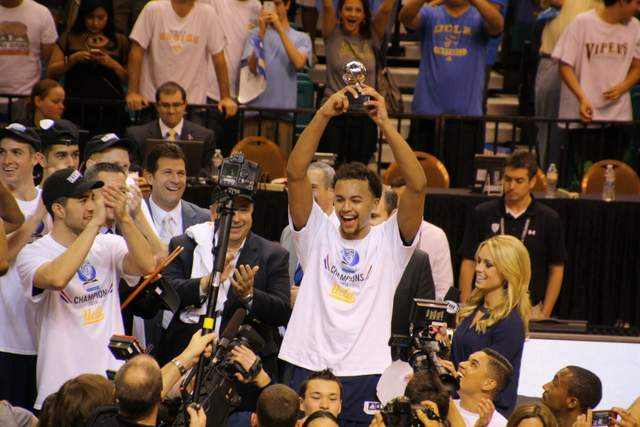
Anderson holding the 2014 Pac-12 Tournament Most Outstanding Player award

College

- Associated Press third-team All-American (2014)
- Sporting News third-team All-American (2014)
- First-team All-Pac-12 (2014)
- NABC first-team All-District 20 (2014)
- USBWA first-team All-District IX (2014)
- UCLA Most Valuable Player (2014)
- Pac-12 tournament Most Outstanding Player (2014)
- Las Vegas Invitational Most Valuable Player (2014)
- Second-team All-Pac-12 (2013)
- Pac-12 All-Freshman team (2013)

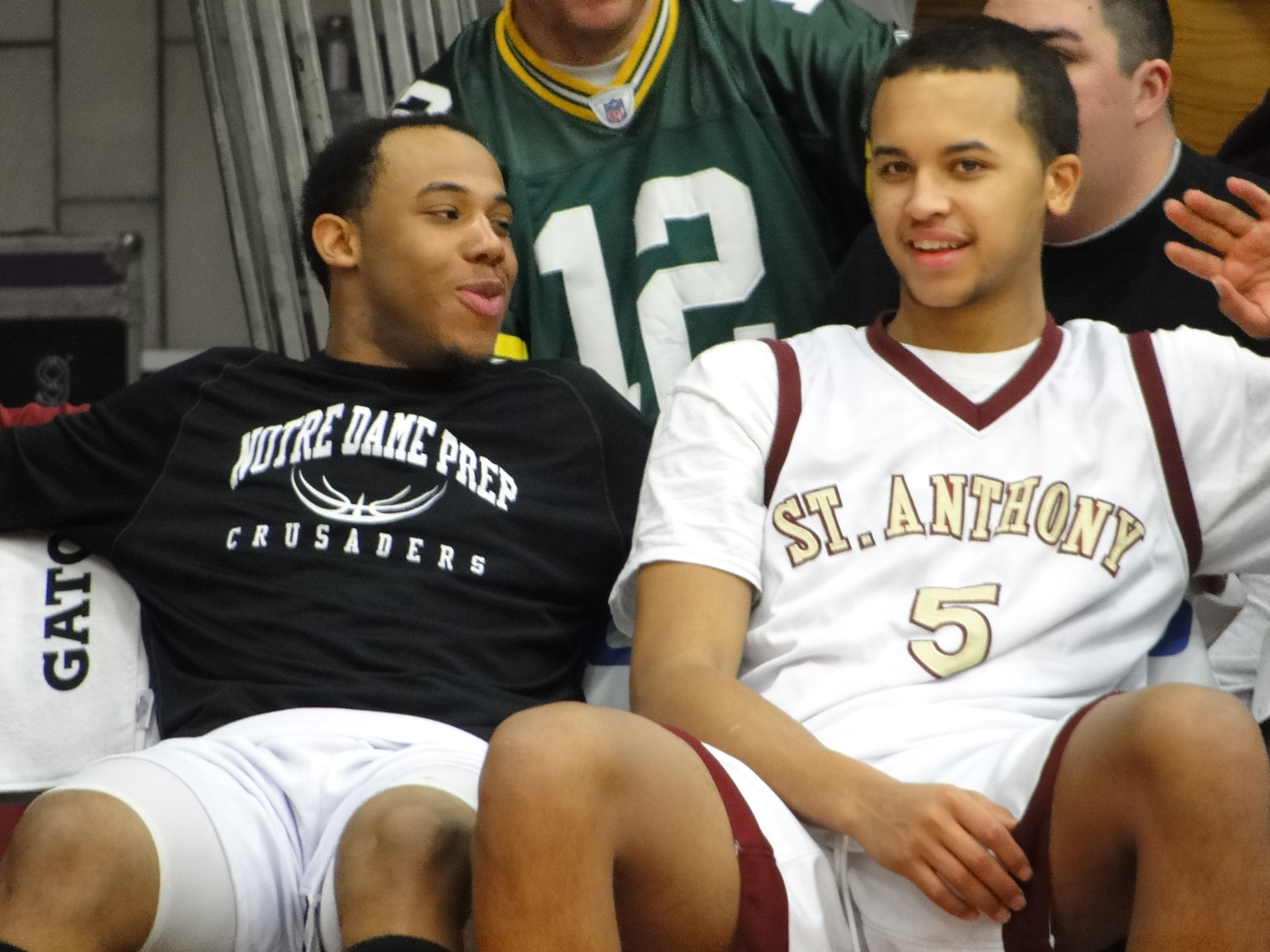
Anderson with St. Anthony in 2011

High school

- The Star-Ledger New Jersey Player of the Year (2012)
- 2× New Jersey Tournament of champions (2011–2012)
- 2× New Jersey Non-Public B state title (2011–2012)
- First-team Parade All-American (2012)
- McDonald's All-American (2012)
- Jordan Brand Classic (2012)
- The Star-Ledger All-Sophomore/Freshman third team (2009)
- IS8/Nike Spring H.S. Classic Freshman of the Tournament (2009)

== Personal life ==
Anderson is the son of Kyle Sr. and Suzanne Anderson. His grandfather, Clifton Anderson, played college football at Indiana and had a two-year professional career in the National Football League (NFL) with the Chicago Cardinals in 1952 and the New York Giants in 1953. Anderson's maternal grandmother grew up in Jamaica; her father was Chinese and married a Jamaican woman, and they lived in Jamaica among the Chinese Jamaicans. After researching his ancestry, Anderson visited China in 2018 to meet distant family in Shenzhen. Anderson's cousin Donald Carey also plays pro basketball.

Anderson married his high school sweetheart, Crystal Oquendo, in 2022. They have one son, born in 2020.

== See also ==
- Naturalized athletes of China
