= Naturalized athletes of China =

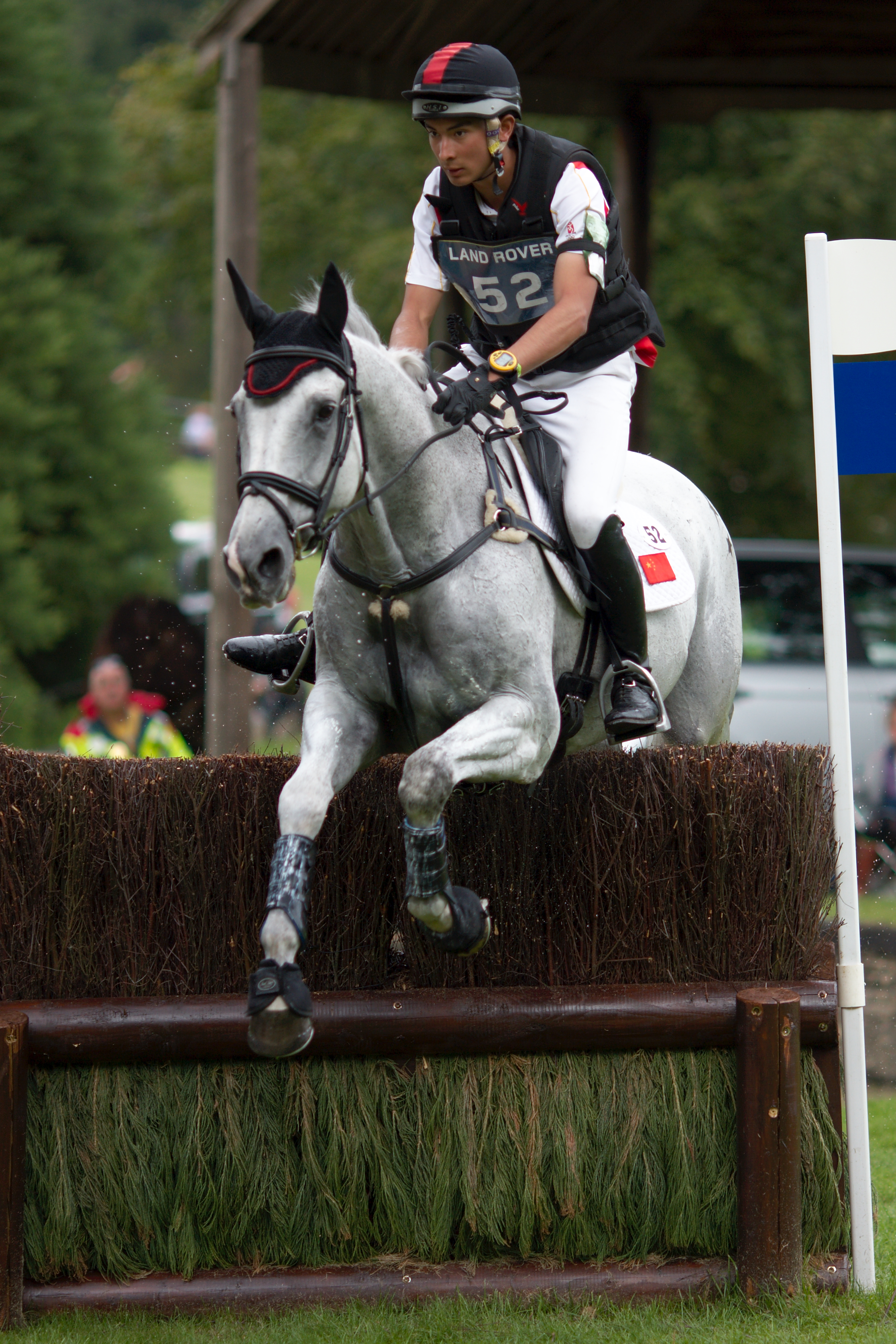
Alex Hua Tian, China's first naturalized Olympic athlete, competed in individual events at the 2008, 2016, and 2020 Summer Games.

The naturalized athletes of China are naturalized citizens who are part, or have been part, of the People's Republic of China's national teams in international competitions or Olympic sports.

== Legal provisions ==
The Nationality Law of the People's Republic of China provides:

Article 3
The People's Republic of China does not recognize dual nationality for any Chinese national.
Article 4
Any person born in China whose parents are both Chinese nationals or one of whose parents is a Chinese national shall have Chinese nationality.
Article 5
Any person born abroad whose parents are both Chinese nationals or one of whose parents is a Chinese national shall have Chinese nationality. But a person whose parents are both Chinese nationals and have both settled abroad, or one of whose parents is a Chinese national and has settled abroad, and who has acquired foreign nationality at birth shall not have Chinese nationality.
Article 7
Foreign nationals or stateless persons who are willing to abide by China's Constitution and laws and who meet one of the following conditions may be naturalized upon approval of their applications:

1. they are near relatives of Chinese nationals;
2. they have settled in China; or
3. they have other legitimate reasons.

== The list ==
Sport	Country of origin	Origin name	Chinese name	Gender	Born	Naturalized	Reasons
Summer sports
Athletics	Canada	Nina Schultz	郑妮娜力 (Zheng Ninali)	F	1998	2021	Born in Canada to a Chinese mother and a Canadian-born father.
Artistic gymnastics	Ukraine	Guo Meilin	郭媚琳 (Guo Meilin)	F	2007	2021	Born in Ukraine to a Chinese father and a Ukrainian mother.
Basketball	United States	Kyle Anderson	李凯尔 (Li Kaier)	M	1993	2023	Born in United States with 1/8 Chinese ancestry (His maternal grandmother's father was Chinese).
Equestrian	(United Kingdom) Britain	Alex Hua Tian	华天 (Hua Tian)	M	1989	2006	Born in the UK to a Chinese father and a British mother.
Football	Brazil	Elkeson	艾克森 (Ai Kesen)	M	1989	2019	Settled in China for a long time.
Football	(United Kingdom) Britain	Nico Yennaris	李可 (Li Ke)	M	1993	2019	Born in the UK to a mother of Chinese origin and a Cypriot father.
Football	(United Kingdom) Britain	Tyias Browning	蒋光太 (Jiang Guangtai)	M	1994	2020	Born in the UK to a mother of Chinese origin and a British father.
Football	Brazil	Aloísio	洛国富 (Luo Guofu)	M	1988	2020	Settled in China for a long time.
Football	Brazil	Alan Carvalho	阿兰 (A Lan)	M	1989	2020	Settled in China for a long time.
Football	Brazil	Fernandinho	费南多 (Fei Nanduo)	M	1993	2020	Settled in China for a long time.
Football	Brazil	Serginho	塞尔吉尼奥 (Sai Erjini'ao)	M	1995	2025	Settled in China for a long time.
Winter sports
Figure skating	United States	Ashley Lin	林姗 (Lin Shan)	F	2003	2019	Born in the US to Chinese parents with U.S. citizenship.
Figure skating	United States	Beverly Zhu	朱易 (Zhu Yi)	F	2002	2018	Born in the US to Chinese parents with U.S. citizenship.
Figure skating	United States	Angel Li	李安其 (Li Anqi)	F	2005	to be confirmed	Born in the US to Chinese parents with U.S. citizenship.
Freestyle skiing	United States	Eileen Gu	谷爱凌 (Gu Ailing)	F	2003	2019	Born in the US to a Chinese mother and an American father.
Ice hockey	Canada	Ty Schultz	郑恩来 (Zheng Enlai)	M	1997	2017	Born in Canada to a Chinese mother and a German father.
Ice hockey	Canada	Kimberly Newell	周嘉鹰 (Zhou Jiaying)	F	1995	2018	Born in Canada to a Chinese mother and a Canadian father.
Short track speed skating	South Korea	Lim Hyo-jun	林孝俊 (Lin Xiaojun)	M	1996	2020	At the invitation of the Chinese Skating Association.
Short track speed skating	Hungary	Shaolin Sándor Liu	劉少林 (Liú Shàolín)	M	1995	2023	Born in Hungary to a Chinese father and a Hungarian mother.
Short track speed skating	Hungary	Shaoang Liu	刘少昂 (Liú Shào'áng)	M	1998	2023	Born in Hungary to a Chinese father and a Hungarian mother.

== See also ==
- Chinese nationality law
- List of Chinese naturalized footballers
