= Terrence Roberts (basketball) =

American professional basketball player (born 1984)

Personal information
- Born: August 14, 1984 (age 42) Newark, New Jersey, U.S.
- Listed height: 6 ft 9 in (2.06 m)
- Listed weight: 230 lb (104 kg)

Career information
- High school: St. Anthony (Jersey City, New Jersey)
- College: Syracuse (2003–2007)
- NBA draft: 2007: undrafted
- Playing career: 2008–2017
- Position: Power forward

Career history
- 2008: Elitzur Kiryat Ata
- 2008: Ironi Ramat Gan
- 2009: U-Mobitelco Cluj-Napoca
- 2009–2010: Saitama Broncos
- 2010: Ferro-ZNTU
- 2011: ASU Sports Club
- 2011: Marinos de Anzoátegui
- 2011: Los Angeles D-Fenders
- 2012–2013: Busan KT Sonicboom
- 2016: Super City Rangers
- 2017: Calero de Potosi
- 2017: Al Shamal

Career highlights
- Third-team Parade All-American (2003)

Terrence James Gregory Roberts (born August 14, 1984) is an American professional basketball player. He played college basketball for Syracuse before playing professionally in Europe, Asia, the Middle East, South America, New Zealand, and the NBA Development League.

== High school career ==
Roberts attended St. Anthony High School in Jersey City, New Jersey, where he was coached by the legendary Bob Hurley. As a freshman in 1999–2000, the Friars went 19–7 on the season. During his sophomore campaign, the team went 27–3 but Roberts missed the season with a leg injury.

As a junior in 2001–02, Roberts averaged 10.1 points and 8.0 rebounds for a Friars team that posted a 29–1 mark and finished ranked second in the nation. He earned honorable mention all-state laurels and was a member of the 2002 USADevelopment Festival East Team that finished 3–2 and earned a silver medal.

As a senior in 2002–03, Roberts averaged 17 points, 11 rebounds and six blocks a game. He participated in the New Jersey North-South High School All-Star contest and had eight points and a game-high 10 rebounds. He also claimed the slam dunk contest at the event, and later helped St. Anthony claimed the 2003 New Jersey Tournament of Champions. Roberts subsequently earned third-team Parade All-American recognition and was a first-team all-state pick.

== College career ==
Roberts was used sparingly in his first season at Syracuse before becoming a regular contributor as a sophomore. In 2004–05, Roberts aided Syracuse to a 27–7 record, the Big East Conference Tournament championship, and the 2005 NCAA Tournament first round, finishing fourth on the team in scoring, with 7.2 points per game. After Billy Edelin left Syracuse for personal reasons, Roberts started the final seven games of the season, averaging 8.4 points, 5.7 rebounds and 2.0 rebounds per game over that span.

With Hakim Warrick's departure from Syracuse following the 2004–05 season, Roberts started all 35 games for the Orange as a junior, averaging a career-high 10.7 points per game, in addition to being Syracuse's leading rebounder with 7.6 boards per game. The highlight of his season came against Rutgers University on February 1, 2006. Down by one with under 7.6 seconds left in overtime, Roberts, who had hit only 3 three-pointers in his first two seasons at Syracuse, drained a buzzer-beating shot to give Syracuse an 86–84 win.

Roberts was named to the preseason All-BIG EAST Conference team prior to the start of his senior season. However, he failed to live up to expectations during the regular season, partially due to a knee injury that bothered him for most of the campaign. He started all 33 games he appeared in as a senior, and his 8.1 rebound average topped the squad. Roberts had at least one rebound in 119 of his 127 career games.

In 127 games over his four-year career at Syracuse, Roberts averaged 7.6 points and 5.6 rebounds in 22.9 minutes per game.

== Professional career ==
After going undrafted in the 2007 NBA draft, Roberts moved to Greece where he joined Rethymno BC. However, he left the club before appearing in any games for them.

For the 2008–09 season, Roberts moved to Israel. Early on in the season, he had two short stints with Elitzur Kiryat Ata and Ironi Ramat Gan before leaving the country in December. In January 2009, he signed with U-Mobitelco Cluj-Napoca of Romania for the rest of the season. In 15 games for Cluj-Napoca, he averaged 10.3 points and 5.7 rebounds per game.

In September 2009, Roberts signed with the Saitama Broncos for the 2009–10 bj league season. The Broncos struggled during the season and Roberts felt the team "under-achieved". In 48 games for Saitama in 2009–10, he averaged 11.8 points, 7.5 rebounds, 1.0 assists and 1.1 steals per game.

In September 2010, Roberts signed with Ferro-ZNTU of Ukraine for the 2010–11 season. However, he left the club in November after appearing in eight league games. In December 2010, he signed with Jordanian club ASU Sports Club for the 2011 West Asian Basketball League. Then in April 2011, he joined Marinos de Anzoátegui of Venezuela for a three-game stint.

In November 2011, Roberts was acquired by the Los Angeles D-Fenders of the NBA Development League following a successful tryout with the team. Between December 9 and December 12, Roberts spent three days with the Oklahoma City Thunder during training camp in the lead up to the 2011–12 NBA season. He returned to the D-Fenders following this stint, but was later waived by the team on December 28 due to an injury. In 11 games for the D-Fenders, he averaged 6.9 points and 3.9 rebounds per game.

In December 2012, Roberts signed with Busan KT Sonicboom of the Korean Basketball League. He appeared in just four games for the club before departing Korea in mid-January 2013.

On February 16, 2016, Roberts signed with the Super City Rangers for the 2016 New Zealand NBL season. He made his debut for the Rangers in the team's season opener against the Wellington Saints on March 10. In just under 27 minutes of action as the starting center, Roberts recorded nine points, six rebounds and four blocks in a 116–95 loss. On April 16, he had a season-best game with 25 points and 13 rebounds in 29½ minutes of action off the bench in a 111–100 win over the Nelson Giants. He subsequently earned Player of the Week honors for Round 6. The Rangers finished the regular season in fourth place with a 9–9 record. In their semi-final match against the first-seeded Canterbury Rams on June 3, Roberts tied his season high with 25 points to help guide the Rangers to a 104–85 win. The win advanced the Rangers to the final on June 4, where they were outclassed by the Wellington Saints, losing the match 94–82. Roberts appeared in all 20 games for the Rangers in 2016, averaging 11.7 points, 7.3 rebounds and 1.3 blocks per game.

In September 2016, Roberts joined the Wellington Saints for their Asia Basketball Club Championships campaign in Seoul, South Korea.

In 2017, Roberts had short stints in Bolivia (Calero de Potosi) and Qatar (Al Shamal).
