= St. Anthony High School (New Jersey) =

Defunct Catholic high school in Hudson County, New Jersey, United States

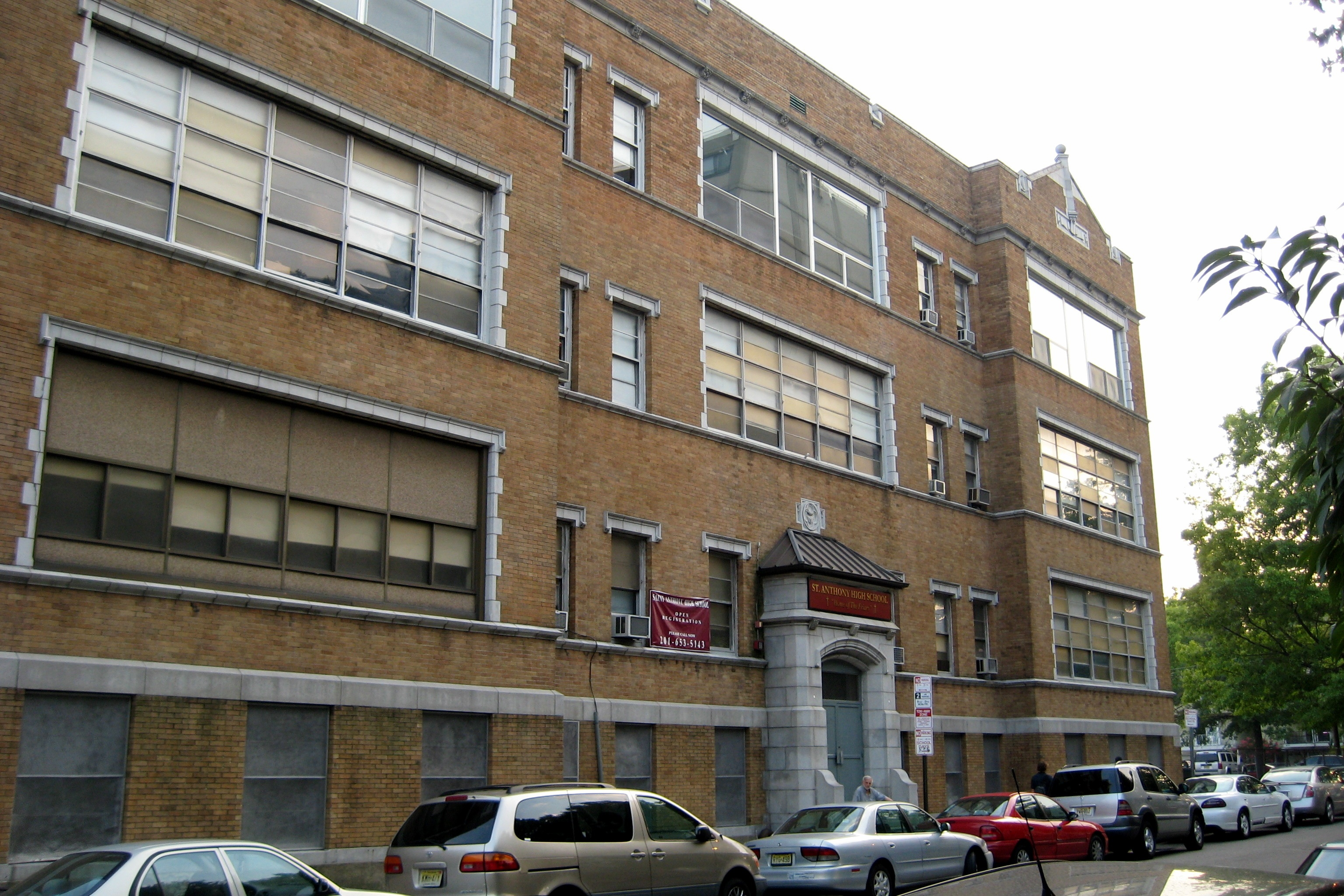
- St. Anthony High School

Location
- 175 8th Street; Jersey City, (Hudson County), New Jersey 07302; 40°43′35″N 74°2′27″W

Information
- Type: Private
- Motto: Omnis en Deus (God in everything)
- Religious affiliations: Roman Catholic, Felician Sisters
- Established: 1952
- Closed: 2017
- Oversight: Archdiocese of Newark
- President: Coach Bob Hurley
- Principal: Chad Broussard
- Faculty: 16.0 FTEs
- Grades: 9–12
- Gender: Coeducational
- Average class size: 16
- Student to teacher ratio: 14.0:1
- Colors: Maroon and gold
- Slogan: Friar Nation
- Athletics conference: Hudson County Interscholastic League
- Sports: Basketball (boys/girls), Volleyball(boys/girls), Football, Baseball, Softball, Track (indoor and outdoor)
- Mascot: Friar
- Team name: Friars
- Rival: St. Patrick's, St. Benedict's, Hudson Catholic, Roselle Catholic
- Accreditation: Middle States Association of Colleges and Schools
- School fees: $450
- Tuition: $6,000
- Dean of Students: Ralph Dinielli (9–10); Daniel Kelly (11–12)
- Athletic Director: Buddy Mathews
- Website: stanthonyhighschool.org/

St. Anthony High School was a four-year co-educational Catholic high school in Jersey City, New Jersey, that was known for its high-powered basketball program coached by Bob Hurley Sr. The school closed in 2017.

It operated under the supervision of the Archdiocese of Newark and was affiliated for much of its history with St. Anthony of Padua Catholic Church, which owns the building. The school had been accredited by the Middle States Association of Colleges and Schools Commission on Elementary and Secondary Schools since 1997.

== History ==
=== Beginnings ===
The school was originally founded to serve the Padua parish, made up of Polish Americans and their children. Over time, the school's demographics shifted along with the local neighborhood, to a predominantly Black and Hispanic population.

=== Basketball success ===
Beginning in the 1960s under Bob Hurley Sr., the school was known for its boys' basketball program, which won the state championship nearly every year and produced a number of successful NBA players.

=== Closure ===
The school struggled with funding and declining enrollments for many decades; however, funding always managed to be found. As of the 2013–14 school year, the high school had 224 students and 16.0 classroom teachers (on an FTE basis), the school had a student–teacher ratio of 14.0:1. There were 59 students in 9th grade, 68 students in 10th grade, 52 students in 11th grade, and 45 students in 12th grade.

In the 2015–2016 school year there were 200 students, and 2016–2017 school year there were 183 students. In September 2016 the board of trustees announced that the community needed to raise $15–20 million in order to keep the school open. In September 2016 Patrick Villanova of The Jersey Journal wrote that St. Anthony "is seemingly always on the brink of closure, considering the razor thin margins."

In April 2017, officials at St. Anthony formally announced the high school would close at the end of the 2016–17 school year, due to declining enrollment (i.e. only 160 students in 2017) and the lack of funding to cover expenses. Increasing expenses were linked to the hiring of non-teaching order educators, and Bob Cook wrote in Forbes that gentrification may have contributed to the school's decline.

In efforts to reverse the decision of the school's looming closure, New Jersey Governor Chris Christie announced a challenge during an April 2017 appearance on radio station WFAN. Christie asked for the commissioners of Major League Baseball, the National Football League, the National Basketball Association, and the National Hockey League to each donate $125,000, in order to meet the school's minimum investment need of $500,000. Despite this, the school was closed in June 2017.

== Athletics ==
The St. Anthony High School Friars competed in the Hudson County Interscholastic League, which was established following a reorganization of sports leagues in Northern New Jersey by the New Jersey State Interscholastic Athletic Association. They practiced at White Eagle Hall and often played at the Jersey City Armory.

=== Boys' basketball ===
The boys' basketball varsity team, coached by Bob Hurley, had been, for over 39 years, the most dominant high school team in the country. St. Anthony had won a national record 28 state championships, set with a 74–44 win in the 2008 sectional championship game over Trenton Catholic Academy to win the Parochial B state title, the program's 25th.

The team has won state championships in:

==== Non-Public C ====
- 1968 (vs. Sacred Heart High School in the finals)
- 1969 (vs. St. Augustine Preparatory School)
- 1973 (vs. St. Joseph's High School of Camden)
- 1974 (vs. St. Joseph's of Camden), 1976 (vs. Sacred Heart)
- 1977 (vs. St. Joseph's of Camden)

==== Non-Public B ====
- 1980 (vs. St. Mary's High School of South Amboy)
- 1981 (vs. Wildwood Catholic High School)
- 1983 (vs. St. Peter the Apostle High School of New Brunswick)
- 1984 (vs. St. Peter of New Brunswick)
- 1985 (vs. St. Peter of New Brunswick)
- 1986 (vs. St. Augustine)
- 1987 (vs. St. Joseph High School of Hammonton)
- 1988 (vs. Wildwood Catholic)
- 1989 (vs. St. Rose)
- 1990 (vs. St. Peter of New Brunswick)
- 1991 (vs. Eustace Preparatory School)
- 1993 (vs. St. Augustine)
- 1995 (vs. St. Peter of New Brunswick)
- 1996 (vs. Eustace)
- 1997 (vs. St. Augustine)
- 2001 (vs. St. Augustine)
- 2002 (vs. St. Rose)
- 2004 (Red Bank Catholic High School)
- 2008 (vs. Trenton Catholic Academy)
- 2011 (vs. Cardinal McCarrick High School)
- 2012 (vs. Gill St. Bernard's School)
- 2016 (vs. Roselle Catholic High School)

The program also won the Tournament of Champions 13 times:

- 1989 (vs. Elizabeth High School in the inaugural tournament by a score of 62–55)
- 1991 (vs. Seton Hall Preparatory School, 63–39)
- 1993 (vs. Middle Township High School, 84–59)
- 1995 (vs. Shawnee High School, 47–44)
- 1996 (vs. Shawnee, 65–57 in overtime)
- 1997 (vs. Seton Hall Prep, 69–63)
- 2001 (vs. Malcolm X Shabazz High School, 48–47)
- 2002 (vs. Neptune High School, 69–42)
- 2004 (vs. Bloomfield Tech High School, 67–55)
- 2008 (vs. Science Park High School, 69–36)
- 2011 (vs. Plainfield High School, 61–49)
- 2012 (vs. Plainfield, 66–62)
- 2016 (vs. Linden High School, 55–38)

With a 61–49 win in the 2011 Tournament of Champions over Plainfield High School, the St. Anthony team completed a 33–0 undefeated season, won its 11th Tournament of Champions and was recognized by USA Today with its fourth national championship. The program's 27 NJSIAA state group titles are the most of any school in the state.

St. Anthony produced over 150 players to Division I basketball programs, all on full scholarships. Hurley has coached five first-round NBA draft picks, including his own son, Bobby Hurley.

==== In popular media ====
His team has been the subject of the book titled The Street Stops Here and a 2010 documentary film based on the book. That year, documentary crews captured the entire season as the Friars finished the season as the #1 team in the country.

=== Girls' basketball ===
The 1984 girls basketball team won the Non-Public Group B state championship, defeating Wildwood Catholic High School by a score of 59–46 in the tournament final.

=== Baseball ===
The baseball team won the Non-Public Group C state championship in 1970 (defeating St. Joseph High School of Hammonton in the tournament final), 1971 (vs. Saint Augustine Preparatory School) and 1972 (vs. St. Joseph of Hammonton), and won the Group B title in 1987 (vs. Eustace Preparatory School). The 1971 team came back from a 2–0 deficit to win the Parochial C title with a 3–2 win against St. Augustine.

=== State and national championships ===
State and national Championships
Season	Sport	Number of Championships	Year
Winter	Basketball, Boys	28 state championships and 4 national championships	states: 1968, 1969, 1973, 1974, 1976, 1977, 1980, 1981, 1983, 1984, 1985, 1986, 1987, 1988, 1989, 1990, 1991, 1993, 1995, 1996, 1997, 2001, 2002, 2004, 2008, 2011, 2012, 2016
Total championships		32 (most in U.S. history)	

== Notable alumni ==
- Kyle Anderson (born 1993; class of 2012), basketball player for the Minnesota Timberwolves
- Willie Banks (born 1969; class of 1987), former Major League Baseball pitcher
- Rashon Burno (born 1978). basketball coach who is the head coach of the Northern Illinois Huskies men's basketball team
- Eli Carter (born 1991), professional basketball player who played for ASE Essaouira of the Nationale 1
- Petey Cipriano (born 1983), basketball coach and former player who is currently an assistant coach at Southern University
- R. J. Cole (born 1999; class of 2017), basketball player who plays professionally in Lithuania
- Tim Coleman (born 1995), international basketball player
- Devon Collier (born 1991; class of 2010), basketball player who has played professionally in Puerto Rico
- Hallice Cooke (born 1995), guard for Nevada Wolf Pack basketball team
- Donald Copeland (born 1984; class of 2002), former professional basketball player who is the head coach of the Wagner Seahawks men's basketball team
- Terry Dehere (born 1971; class of 1989), politician, former NBA basketball player
- Jerome Frink (born 1993), professional basketball player for Domingo Paulino Santiago of the Dominican Santiago League
- Asante Gist (born 1997), professional basketball player
- Jimmy Hall (born 1994), basketball player in the Israeli National League
- Juvaris Hayes (born 1998), coach for the Merrimack Warriors men's basketball team and former professional player
- Bobby Hurley (born 1971; class of 1989), former NBA player and current head basketball coach at Arizona State University
- Dan Hurley (born 1973), former point guard at Seton Hall University and current head basketball coach at the University of Connecticut
- Lucky Jones (born 1993; class of 2011), professional basketball player for Aris of the Greek Basket League
- Kaws (born 1974 as Brian Donnelly), graffiti artist, limited-edition clothing and toy designer
- Myles Mack (born 1993), professional basketball player for GTK Gliwice of the Polish Basketball League
- Markis McDuffie (born 1997), professional basketball player for Maccabi Ashdod of the Israeli Basketball Premier League
- Jamar McGloster (born 1995), professional gridiron football offensive tackle for the Montreal Alouettes of the Canadian Football League
- Roshown McLeod (born 1975), played in three NBA seasons from 1999 to 2001, for the Atlanta Hawks and briefly for the Philadelphia 76ers
- Derrick Mercer, basketball player who played point guard for American University
- Josh A. Moore (born 1980; transferred), former NBA basketball player
- Ahmad Nivins (born 1987), professional basketball power forward
- Markquis Nowell (born 1999; transferred), professional basketball player who played for the Toronto Raptors
- Ashton Pankey (born 1992), basketball player
- Rodrick Rhodes (born 1973; class of 1992), former NBA basketball player
- David Rivers (born 1965; class of 1984), former NBA player for the Los Angeles Lakers, played at Notre Dame
- Nyree Roberts (born 1976), former professional women's basketball player who played in the WNBA for the Houston Comets and Washington Mystics
- Terrence Roberts (born 1984; class of 2003), former professional basketball player
- Mike Rosario (born 1990; class of 2008), professional basketball player for Piratas de Quebradillas of the Baloncesto Superior Nacional
- Tyshawn Taylor (born 1990; class of 2008), professional basketball player
- John Valentin (born 1967), former professional baseball player who played in ten MLB seasons from 1992 to 2001, for the Boston Red Sox and for the New York Mets in 2002
- Luther Wright (born 1971; transferred), former player in the NBA for the Utah Jazz
