= Maurice Catarcio =

American wrestler (1929–2005)

Personal information
- Born: Maurice A. Catarcio; March 21, 1929 Ocean City, New Jersey, U.S.
- Died: May 12, 2005 (aged 76) Del Haven, New Jersey, U.S.
- Spouse: Roxanne Catarcio
- Children: Nora Catarcio, Lisa Marie Catarcio, Dominic Catarcio, Maurice Catacio, Jr.

Professional wrestling career
- Ring name(s): The Matador; Maurice Catarcio
- Billed height: 5 ft 11 in (1.80 m)
- Billed weight: 210 lb (95 kg)

Maurice A. Catarcio (March 21, 1929 – May 12, 2005) was an American professional wrestler. He was best known for competing in the then World Wide Wrestling Federation from 1957 to 1960, under the ring-name The Matador. After being diagnosed with prostate cancer in 1991, he became an advocate for public health and fitness. He was also in The Guinness Book of World Records for his public displays of strength.

== Biography ==
=== Early life ===
Catarcio was born on March 21, 1929, in Ocean City, New Jersey to parents Dominick and Julia Marie. He had one sister. Beginning at age 11, he lifted weights and participated in bodybuilding. In 1947, he graduated from now closed Cape May High School and then served with the United States Navy for 55 months. On June 30, 1950, three days after the beginning of the Korean War, he was honorably discharged, but he was later recalled for another 22 months and received another honorable discharge.

Catarcio worked as a professional wrestler in the Capitol Wrestling Corporation which later became the World Wrestling Federation from 1957 to 1960. He was known as "The Matador" and wore a bullfighting cape to the ring.

=== Feats of strength ===
Catarcio began putting on public displays of strength after he was diagnosed with prostate cancer in 1991. Because of these displays, he was given the nickname "Magnificent Maurice". He also became an advocate for fitness and health. At age 69, he pulled an 80-foot (24 m) boat filled with 125 passengers while swimming the backstroke for 300 feet (91 m) in a lake, which earned him a place in The Guinness Book of World Records in the category "feats of strength". Then, at age 72, he dragged a 27,000-pound (12,000 kg) bus down a New York City street on the Late Show with David Letterman. Other stunts included tearing 17 decks of cards in 59 seconds and lifting a refrigerator with three women on top of it.

=== Personal life ===
Besides being a professional wrestler, Catarcio had a number of occupations. He was certified in fitness training in Santa Barbara, California, and certified in cardiopulmonary resuscitation. He was also a police officer, lifeguard, and a painting contractor, the latter for thirty years. He served as Commissioner of the Cape May County Bridge Commission from 1980 to 1987 and Chairman of the Bridge Commission from 1987 to 2001.

Catarcio was also a member of St. Raymond's Church and the Governor's Council on Fitness. He was a president for the Kiwanis Club of Cape May, the Sons of Italy in Lower Township, and the Lower Township Republican Club. In addition, Catarcio was a member of the Knights of Columbus and the Mayor's Advisory Committee, both in Cape May. For ten years, he was the Republican Leader in Lower Township and was a member of the Electoral College in 1976. Moreover, he was a Republican State Committeeman and involved with the Boy Scouts of America.

On May 12, 2005, at age 76, he died of cancer at his home in the Del Haven section of Middle Township, New Jersey. At the time of his death, he was married to his wife Roxanne with whom he had one son, Maurice Jr.
