= List of Chinese naturalized footballers =

Chinese naturalized footballers are association football players originally from another country who changed (Note: Chinese nationals cannot have dual nationality according to the law.) their nationality to Chinese (People's Republic of China) via naturalization.

== History ==
Born in 1990 in Shanghai to a Tanzanian father and Chinese mother, Eddy Francis made one appearance for the China national under-14 football team in 2004. This was the first time a multiracial player has appeared for a China national football team of any level.

Since 2019, China had begun a series of naturalization on foreign-based players in order to improve the China national team's fortunes, with the naturalization of Nico Yennaris, an English-born Cypriot and Chinese player. After the naturalization of Yennaris, China continued its naturalization process, with Tyias Browning, another English-born player with Chinese ancestry, being naturalized. Subsequently, Elkeson, a Brazilian player with no Chinese ancestry, was naturalized to become the 90th Brazilian who chose to represent another team outside Brazil.

== List of naturalized footballers ==
The following is a list of notable Chinese naturalized footballers. Footballers who have non-Chinese descent but likely had Chinese nationality at birth (e.g. Eddy Francis) or who are not notable, do not appear in the list.

If the player has previously participated in official matches on behalf of other national teams, he will still not be able to play for the Chinese national team after acquiring or restoring Chinese nationality. However, he can participate in Chinese football competitions as a domestic player.

Origin name (Chinese name)	Born	Origin nation	Naturalized	Eligible for China	Chinese ancestry	Reason of naturalization	Notes
Francisco "Chico" Chen (Chen Jiayu)	1993	Portugal	2016	✓	✓	Born in Lisbon to Chinese parents. His ancestral home is in Guangzhou.	
John Hou Sæter (Hou Yongyong)	1998	Norway	2019	✓	✓	Born in Trondheim to a Norwegian father and a Chinese mother. His ancestral home is in Luoyang, Henan.	
Alexander N'Doumbou (Qian Jiegei)	1992	Gabon	2019	✗	✓	Born in Port-Gentil to a Gabonese father and a Chinese mother. His ancestral home is in Zhejiang.	
Nico Yennaris (Li Ke)	1993	England	2019	✓	✓	Born in Leytonstone to a Cypriot father and a mother of Chinese origin. His ancestral home is in Guangdong. He gave up his British citizenship when he signed with Beijing Guoan.	
Pedro Delgado (De Erjiaduo)	1997	Portugal	2019	✓	✗	Unknown; no Chinese ancestry.	
Elkeson (Ai Kesen)	1989	Brazil	2019	✓	✗	Settled in China for a long time; no Chinese ancestry.	
Tyias Browning (Jiang Guangtai)	1994	England	2019	✓	✓	Born in Liverpool to a mother of Chinese origin. His ancestral home is in Jiangmen, Guangdong.	
Aloísio (Luo Guofu)	1988	Brazil	2019	✓	✗	Settled in China for a long time; no Chinese ancestry.	
Ricardo Goulart (Gao Late)	1991	Brazil	2019–2021	✗	✗	Settled in China for a long time; no Chinese ancestry. Renounced Chinese nationality in 2021 after returning to Brazil.	
Alan Carvalho (A Lan)	1989	Brazil	2019	✓	✗	Settled in China for a long time; no Chinese ancestry.	
Dai Wai Tsun (Dai Weijun)	1999	Hong Kong	2020	✓	✓	Born in Hong Kong. Previously held Hong Kong and British passports.	
Fernandinho (Fei Nanduo)	1993	Brazil	2020	✓	✗	Settled in China for a long time; no Chinese ancestry.	
Roberto Siucho (Xiao Taotao)	1997	Peru	2020–2023	✗	✓	Born in Lima to a father of Chinese origin. His ancestral home is in Zhongshan, Guangdong. Renounced Chinese nationality in early 2023.	
Arturo Cheng (Zheng Tuluo)	1999	Paraguay	2021	✓	✓	Born in Presidente Franco to a Chinese father and Paraguayan mother.	
Denny Wang (Wang Yi)	1998	Italy	2021	✓	✓	Born in Alba to Chinese parents. His ancestral home is in Zhejiang.	
Serginho (Sai Erjini'ao)	1995	Brazil	2025	✓	✗	Settled in China for a long time; no Chinese ancestry.	
Ming-yang Yang (Yang Mingyang)	1995	Switzerland	2025	✓	✓	Born in Basel to a Chinese father. His ancestral home is in Wuhan.	

== See also ==
- Naturalized athletes of China
