= Louis Purnell =

Museum curator and Tuskegee Airman (1920–2001)

Louis Rayfield Purnell, Sr.
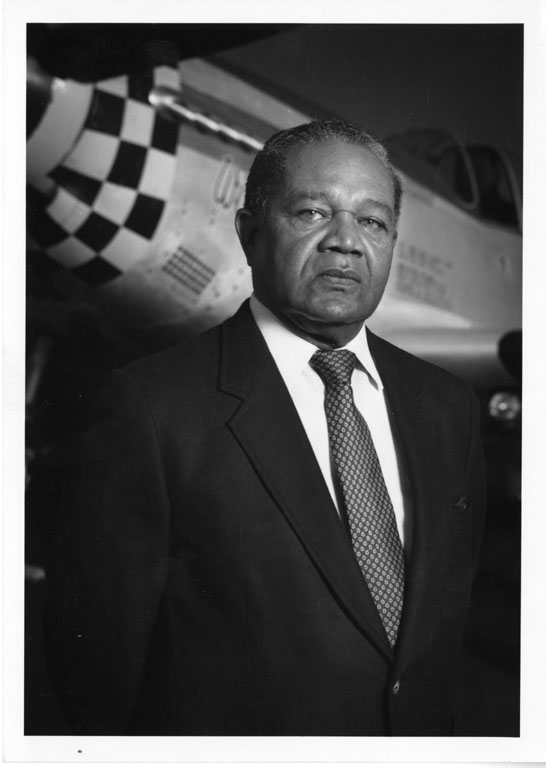
- Louis R. Purnell, Curator at NASM (c. 1980)
- Born: April 5, 1920; Snow Hill, Maryland, U.S.
- Died: August 10, 2001 (aged 81); Washington, D.C., U.S.
- Education: Lincoln University; Tuskegee Institute; George Washington University
- Alma mater: Howard University
- Occupations: Curator and Museum Specialist
- Employer(s): National Air and Space Museum; National Museum of Natural History
- Spouse: JoAnn
- Children: 3
- Military career
- Allegiance: United States of America
- Branch: United States Army Air Forces
- Service years: 1942–1945
- Rank: Captain
- Conflicts: World War II
- Awards: Distinguished Flying Cross; Air Medal (6 Oak Leaf clusters)

Louis Rayfield Purnell Sr. (April 5, 1920 – August 10, 2001) was a noted curator at the United States' National Air and Space Museum and earlier in life, a decorated Tuskegee Airman. At the museum, he became expert in space flight artifacts, particularly spacesuits, and was instrumental in curating artifacts related to space exploration, during the pivotal years of the 1960s and into the 1980s. Purnell was the first African American to become a curator at the Smithsonian Institution.

Earlier, as a captain in the Army Air Corps and a fighter pilot, he served in the European and North African theater during World War II. For his service during the war, he was awarded the Distinguished Flying Cross and the Air Medal with six Oak Leaf Clusters.

== Early life ==
Purnell was born in Snow Hill, Maryland on April 5, 1920. His father painted Pullman railroad cars and his mother was a teacher. He was raised in Wilmington, Delaware and later Cape May, New Jersey. He attended and graduated with honors from Cape May High School, which was integrated, though Black students accounted for little more than one percent of the school's enrollment.

From an early age, Purnell was interested in aircraft and flight. He would ride his bike to the nearby airfield to watch and study the planes in flight. When his African-American family moved to a mostly white neighborhood, his father advised him that, "in order to appear equal to, you have to be twice as good." Young Purnell would repeat this advice later in life.

Purnell's interest in flight led him to study it at Lincoln University. There he earned his civilian pilots license, which was a rare achievement for a black man at the time.

== Tuskegee and the war ==
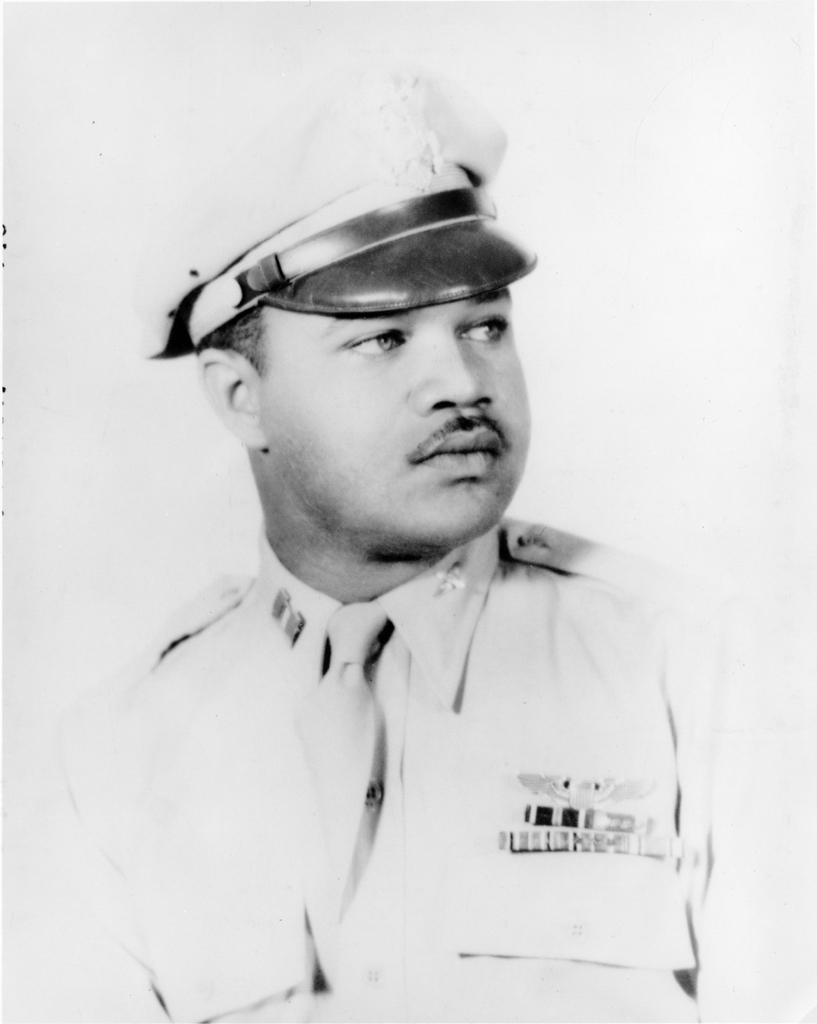
In his airman uniform, circa 1942

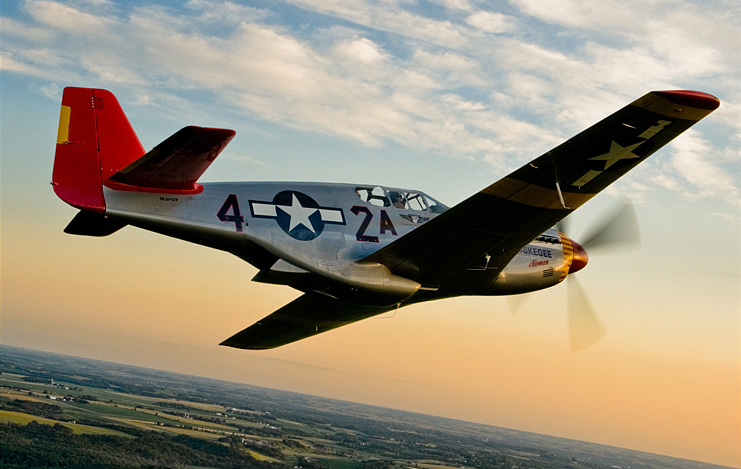
P-51 aircraft with red markings. (Note: The Tuskegee Airmen became known for flying the P-51 aircraft with red markings that distinguished the Tuskegee Airmen included red bands on the noses of P-51s as well as a red rudder; their P-51B and D Mustangs flew with similar color schemes, with red propeller spinners, yellow wing bands and all-red tail surfaces.)

In the early 1940s, Tuskegee Institute had the only program in the United States that trained blacks in advanced flying techniques. Purnell applied and was accepted. According to Purnell, the program was very competitive, with two-thirds of the trainees failing. Purnell succeeded. Although the program was championed by the likes of Eleanor Roosevelt and received interest from the War Department, the all-white Army Air Corps initially resisted deploying blacks.

In 1942, through the activism of a fellow cadet and the National Association for the Advancement of Colored People, all-black Army Air Corp units were formed. Purnell was eventually commissioned a captain and served in the 99th Fighter Squadron, and later the 332nd Fighter Group. He served two tours of duty in North Africa, Sicily, and the Italian peninsula, flying 88 escort missions. He guarded bombers and encountered sometimes open racism from fellow airmen, whom he then protected in the air. In between combat tours, Purnell returned to Tuskegee as a flight instructor but finding combat "safer", he applied to go back to Europe. For his service, he was awarded the Distinguished Flying Cross and the Air Medal with six Oak Leaf Clusters.

== Gold Medal ==
- Congressional Gold Medal awarded to the Tuskegee Airmen in 2006

== After the war ==
After his service in the war, Purnell attended Howard University and obtained a degree in psychology. He worked as a speech therapist and later a government contracting agent. In 1961, he was hired as a specialist by the Division of Invertebrate Zoology of the National Museum of Natural History. Although he took advanced courses in geology at George Washington University, went on exploration expeditions, and got especially skilled in identifying cephalopods and nautiloids (Purnell found them "beautiful"), his successes were seen by some as a threat "both academically and racially." He was passed over for promotions.

== Air and Space Museum ==
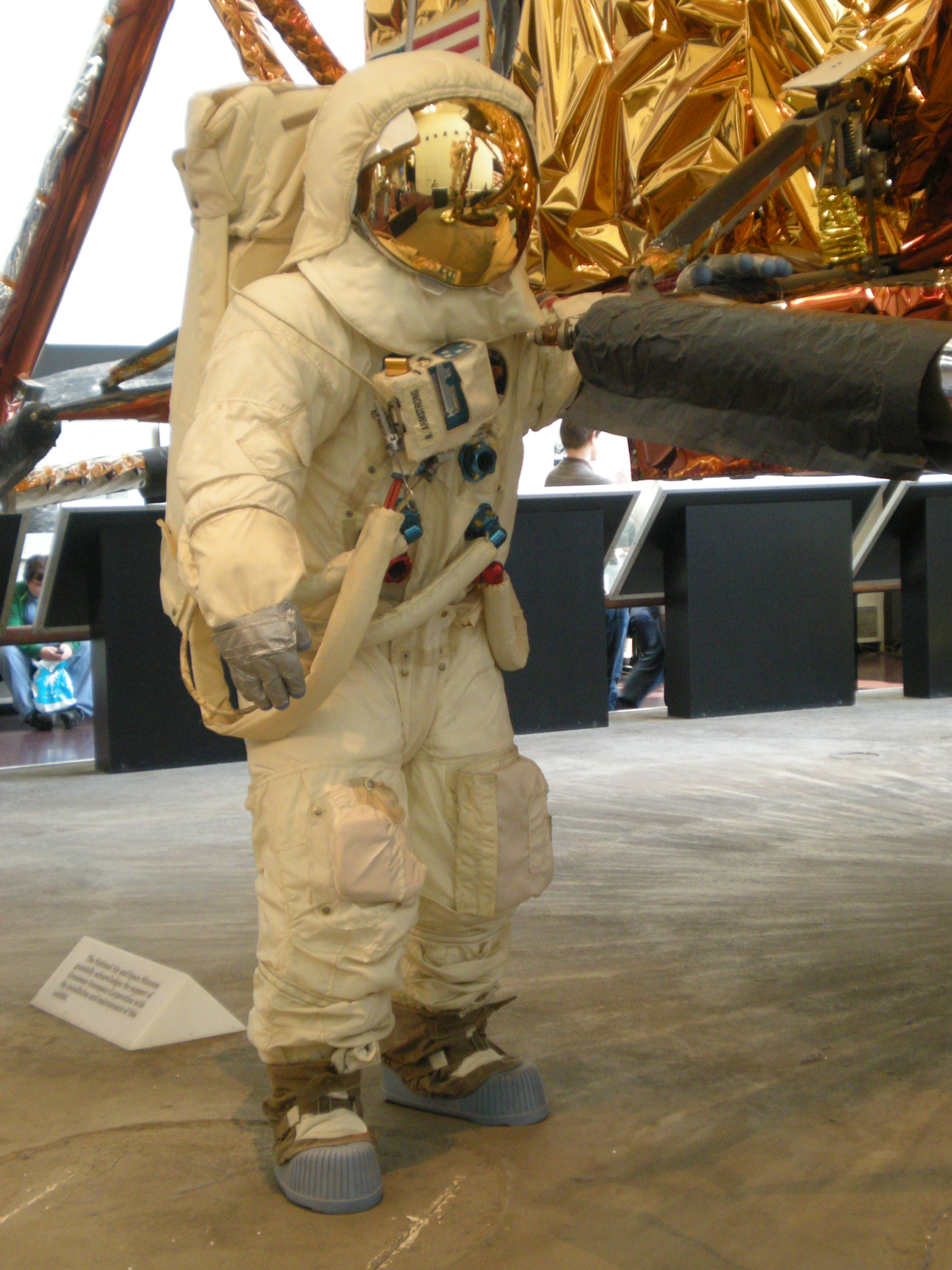
Moon space suit at National Air and Space Museum

In the late 1960s, Purnell applied to join the Aeronautics Department of the National Air and Space Museum. Racism prevented his appointment in the earth flight division, but in 1968 he was hired as a specialist in the Astronautics Department. In 1969, the Moon landing occurred and the Museum was planning its building on the National Mall. Purnell finally advanced to curatorial status in the early 1970s and became expert in space flight artifacts, particularly space suits. He was the first African-American to become a curator at the museum. Purnell was noted for his work on the Spacecraft and Spacesuits exhibit and expanded and cared for the museums collections until his retirement in 1985. Upon his retirement he donated his flying wings and other items from the war to the museum. He afterward remained a consultant for the museum and traveled as a lecturer. Early in the year he died, the foreword he wrote for the book Black Knights: The Story of the Tuskegee Airmen was published.

== Personal ==
At the time of his death from cancer in 2001, he had been married to his second wife, JoAnn, for over thirty years. He had one son and a daughter from a prior marriage and one stepdaughter.

== See also ==
- Dogfights (TV series)
- Executive Order 9981
- Freeman Field Mutiny
- List of Tuskegee Airmen
- Military history of African Americans
- The Tuskegee Airmen (movie)
