= Cliff Anderson (American football) =

American football player (1929–1979)

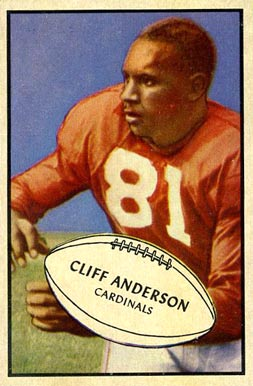
- Anderson on a 1953 Bowman football card

No. 84, 82
- Position: End

Personal information
- Born: November 25, 1929; Cape May, New Jersey, U.S.
- Died: March 16, 1979 (aged 49); Princess Anne, Maryland, U.S.
- Listed height: 6 ft 2 in (1.88 m)
- Listed weight: 215 lb (98 kg)

Career information
- High school: Cape May
- College: Indiana (1948–1951)
- NFL draft: 1952: 25th round, 291st overall pick

Career history

Playing
- Chicago Cardinals (1952–1953); New York Giants (1953)

Coaching
- Shaw (1957–1959) Head coach

Awards and highlights
- 2× Second-team All-Big Ten (1949, 1950)

Career NFL statistics
- Receptions: 28
- Receiving yards: 457
- Touchdowns: 2
- Stats at Pro Football Reference

Head coaching record
- Regular season: 12–12–1 (.500)

Clifton Junior Anderson (November 25, 1929 – March 16, 1979) was an American professional football player who was an end for two seasons in the National Football League (NFL) with the Chicago Cardinals and New York Giants. He was selected by the Cardinals in the 25th round of the 1952 NFL draft after playing college football for the Indiana Hoosiers.

== Early life and college ==
Clifton Junior Anderson was born on November 25, 1929, in Cape May, New Jersey. He attended Cape May High School in Cape May.

He was a member of the Indiana Hoosiers of Indiana University Bloomington from 1948 to 1951 and a three-year letterman from 1949 to 1951. He was named second-team All-Big Ten by the Associated Press in 1949 and by the United Press in 1950.

Anderson was also an All-American shot putter and discus thrower for the Indiana Hoosiers track and field team, finishing 5th and 3rd in the two events respectively at the 1951 NCAA track and field championships.

== Professional career ==
Anderson was selected by the Chicago Cardinals in the 25th round, with the 291st overall pick, of the 1952 NFL draft. He signed with the team on April 5. He played in all 12 games, starting ten, for the Cardinals during the 1952 season, catching 11 passes for 191 yards and two touchdowns. The Cardinals finished the year with a 4–8 record. Anderson started one game for the Cardinals in 1953 and caught one eight-yard pass before being released on September 29, 1953.

Anderson signed with the New York Giants on October 23, 1953. He appeared in eight games, starting four, for the Giants during the 1953 season, recording 16 receptions for 258 yards. He was released in 1954.

== Personal life ==
Anderson died on March 16, 1979, in Princess Anne, Maryland. He is the grandfather of basketball player Kyle Anderson.

== Head coaching record ==
Year	Team	Overall	Conference	Standing	Bowl/playoffs
Shaw Bears (Central Intercollegiate Athletic Association) (1957–1959)
1957	Shaw	5–3	5–3	6th	
1958	Shaw	6–3	6–3	4th	
1959	Shaw	1–6–1	1–6–1	15th	
Shaw:		12–12–1	12–12–1		
Total:		12–12–1			
