= Cape May High School =

Former school in New Jersey, United States

Cape May High School was a public high school in Cape May, in Cape May County in the U.S. state of New Jersey that operated from 1901 to 1960 as part of the Cape May City School District. The school was replaced by Lower Cape May Regional High School, which serves students from Cape May and other surrounding communities.

== History ==
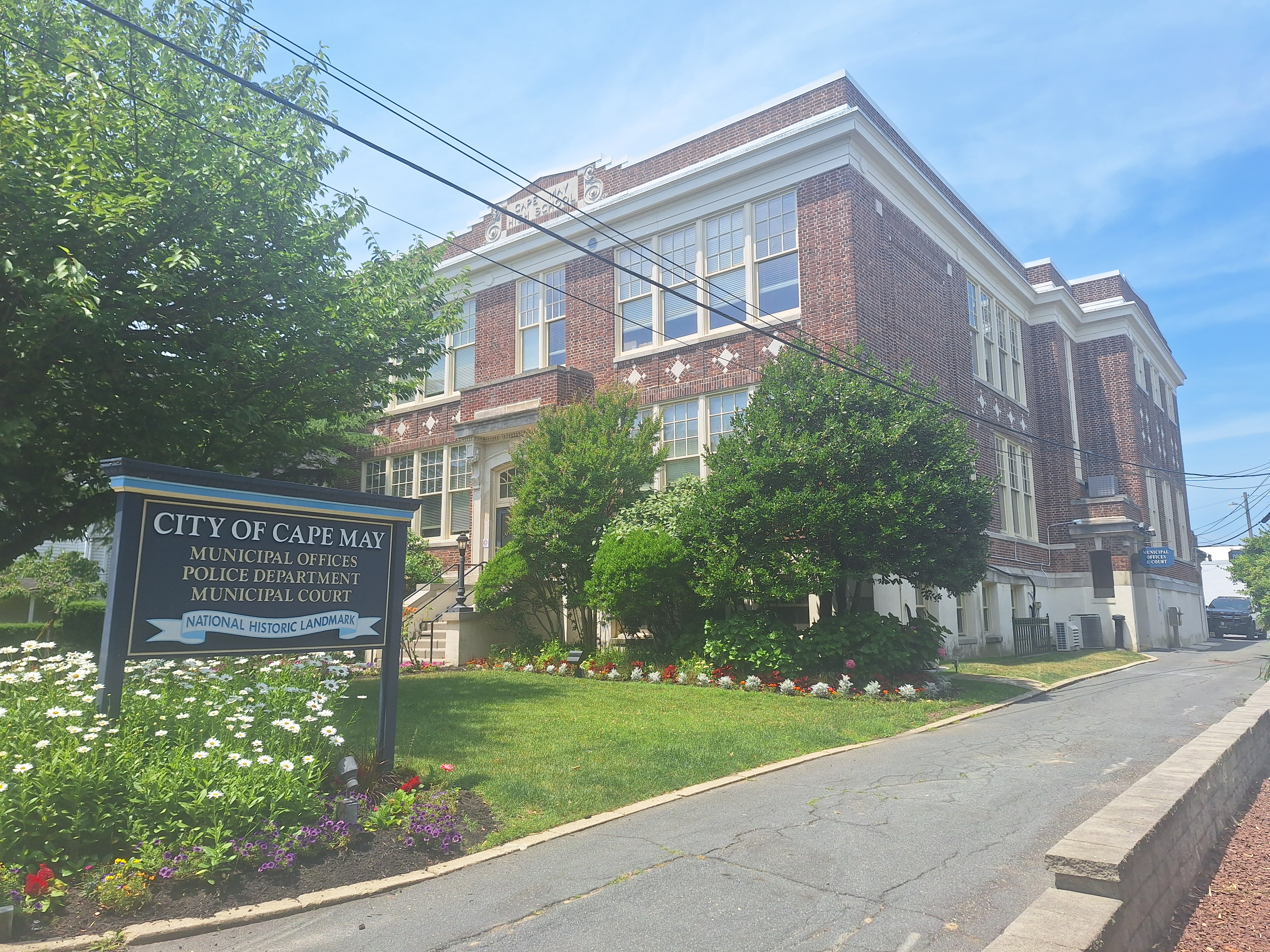
The former Cape May High School (second building), now Cape May City Hall

The first Cape May High School, built in 1901, was designed by Seymour Davis and constructed at a cost of $35,000 (equivalent to $1,400,000 in 2025). In 1917, a new Cape May High School facility was built, with the 1901 building being repurposed as an elementary school. Cape May High School educated students of all races, unlike elementary schools in the district, which were segregated. Cape May High School used the city's former convention hall was used as a basketball arena, baccalaureate venue, an auditorium and a graduation hall. Paul S. Ensminger, originally from Palmyra, Pennsylvania, served for 24 years as principal of Cape May High School.

Cape May High closed effective December 22, 1960, and Lower Cape May Regional High School opened in 1961. Circa 1970, the first Cape May High School building was demolished, and an Acme Markets location was constructed on the site. In 1961, the second Cape May High School building became the city hall, replacing a structure built in 1899; it also serves as the police station. In August 2005, the State Historic Preservation Office issued a Certification of Eligibility to the Old Cape May High School for inclusion on the state register of historic places.

== Notable alumni ==
- Cliff Anderson (1929–1979), professional football player who played end in the NFL for the Chicago Cardinals and New York Giants
- Maurice Catarcio (1929–2005), professional wrestler best known for competing in the Worldwide Wrestling Federation (since renamed as WWE)
- Louis Purnell (1920–2001), curator at the Smithsonian Institution's National Air and Space Museum and earlier in life, a decorated Tuskegee Airman
- Charles W. Sandman Jr. (1921–1985), politicians who served in the New Jersey Senate from 1954 to 1966 and represented southern New Jersey in the United States House of Representatives from 1965 to 1975
