= Fernandinho (footballer, born March 1993) =

Chinese footballer (born 1993)

Fei Nanduo 费南多
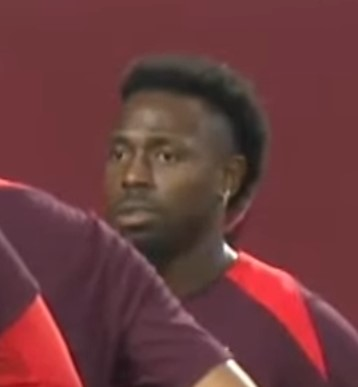
- Fernandinho in 2024

Personal information
- Full name: Fei Nanduo
- Birth name: Fernando Henrique da Conceição
- Date of birth: 16 March 1993 (age 33)
- Place of birth: São Paulo, Brazil
- Height: 1.74 m (5 ft 9 in)
- Position: Winger

Youth career
- 2010–2011: Atlético Sorocaba

Senior career*
Years	Team	Apps	(Gls)
2010–2012	Atlético Sorocaba	2	(0)
2012–2013	Flamengo	6	(0)
2014	Madureira	15	(4)
2014–2015	Estoril Praia	22	(1)
2015	→ Chongqing Lifan (loan)	14	(3)
2016–2019	Chongqing Lifan	87	(22)
2019–2021	Guangzhou FC	18	(5)
2019	→ Hebei China Fortune (loan)	10	(2)
2023–2024	Shandong Taishan	41	(4)
2024	→ Shanghai Shenhua (loan)	10	(1)

International career^{‡}
2024–	China	7	(1)
- * Club domestic league appearances and goals as of 10 April 2024 ‡ National team caps and goals as of 15 July 2025

Fernandinho
- Chinese: 费南多
Transcriptions
Standard Mandarin
- Hanyu Pinyin: Fèi Nánduō

Fernando Henrique da Conceição (Note: Brazilian Portuguese pronunciation: [feʁˈnɐ̃du ẽˈʁiki da kũsejˈsɐ̃w].) (born 16 March 1993), known as Fernando, Fernandinho, (Note: Brazilian Portuguese pronunciation: [feʁnɐ̃ˈdʒĩɲu].) or by his Mandarin name Fei Nanduo (Note: In this Chinese name, the family name is Fei.) (Chinese: 费南多; pinyin: Fèi Nánduō), is a professional footballer who plays as a winger. Born in Brazil, he plays for the China national team.

== Club career ==
=== Atlético Sorocaba ===
Fernandinho began his professional career with local side Atlético Sorocaba after graduating from their youth team.

=== Flamengo ===
After playing in several games he was bought by sports marketing company Traffic and trained with top tier club Flamengo who decided to buy 70% of the economic rights of the player. On 15 August 2012, manager Dorival Júnior decided to give Fernandinho his debut for the club in a league game against Palmeiras where he came on as a substitute for Thomás Jaguaribe in a game that ended in a 1–0 defeat. The following season Mano Menezes became the manager of the team and decided to give him a run of games.

=== Madureira ===
At the start of the 2014 league season it was decided that Fernandinho needed regular playing time and he joined third tier club Madureira.

=== Estoril Praia ===
On 7 February 2014, Fernandinho would soon join top tier Portuguese team Estoril Praia.

=== Chongqing Lifan ===
Fernandinho went on loan to struggling Chinese Super League side Chongqing Lifan in the 2016 summer transfer window. After helping the newly promoted team stay up, he joined permanently on a 4–year deal in January 2016. On 6 March 2016, he scored 2 identical solo run goals after dribbling past the entire opposition defence and handed Chongqing a shock 2–1 home win against 5-time defending champions Guangzhou Evergrande Taobao.

=== Guangzhou Evergrande ===
After four seasons with Chongqing, Fernandinho joined Chinese club, Guangzhou Evergrande and was immediately loaned to Hebei China Fortune for the rest of the season.

Fernandinho was fined a club-record amount of ¥3 million ($430,000) for a breach of discipline as he was absent for Guangzhou's preseason training camp in Dubai.

==== Hebei China Fortune (loan) ====
On 15 July 2019, Fernandinho joined Hebei China Fortune on loan until the end of the 2019 Chinese Super League season. He returned to Evergrande before the 2020 season but overall failed to settle in the team and make an impact.

=== Shandong Taishan ===
On 11 April 2023, Fernandinho returned to the Chinese Super League after not playing for over a year and joined Shandong Taishan. On 16 April 2023, he made his debut in a 1–0 away defeat against Shanghai Shenhua. On 29 June 2023, he scored his first goal for Taishan in a 4–1 home win against Changchun Yatai.

==== Shanghai Shenghua (loan) ====
On 11 July 2024, Fernandinho joined Shanghai Shenghua on loan until the end of the 2024 season. On 13 September, he scored a goal and recorded two assists which help Shanghai Shenhua to win 4–3 against Zhejiang Professional.

== International career ==
In 2020, Fernandinho gained Chinese citizenship through naturalisation. Following his naturalisation as a Chinese citizen, his name was Sinicised as Fei Nanduo.

On 21 March 2024, Fernandinho made his international debut for China in a 2–2 away draw against Singapore in the 2026 FIFA World Cup qualification. On 26 March 2024, Fernandinho scored his first international goal for China, a penalty in a 4–1 home win over Singapore in the 2026 FIFA World Cup qualifiers.

== Career statistics ==
=== Club ===
As of match played 4 December 2024

Appearances and goals by club, season and competition
Club	Season	League			State League		National Cup		Continental		Other		Total	
Club	Season	Division	Apps	Goals	Apps	Goals	Apps	Goals	Apps	Goals	Apps	Goals	Apps	Goals
Atlético Sorocaba	2010	Campeonato Paulista Série A2	—		1 (Note: Appearance in Campeonato Paulista Série A2)	0	—		—		—		1	0
Atlético Sorocaba	2011	Campeonato Paulista Série A2	—		0	0	—		—		—		0	0
Atlético Sorocaba	2012	Campeonato Paulista Série A2	—		1	0	—		—		—		1	0
Atlético Sorocaba	Total		—		2	0	—		—		—		2	0
Flamengo	2012	Série A	1	0	—		—		—		—		1	0
Flamengo	2013	Série A	5	0	0 (Note: Appearance in Taça da Liga)	0	1	0	—		—		6	0
Flamengo	Total		6	0	0	0	1	0	—		—		7	0
Madureira	2014	Série C	6	1	9	3	—		—		—		15	4
Estoril Praia	2014–15	Primeira Liga	19	1	—		1	0	0	0	3	0	23	1
Chongqing Lifan (Loan)	2015	Chinese Super League	14	3	—		1	0	—		—		15	3
Chongqing Lifan	2016	Chinese Super League	29	9	—		0	0	—		—		29	9
Chongqing Lifan	2017	Chinese Super League	27	7	—		0	0	—		—		27	7
Chongqing Lifan	2018	Chinese Super League	17	3	—		1	0	—		—		18	3
Chongqing Lifan	2019	Chinese Super League	11	3	—		2	0	—		—		13	3
Chongqing Lifan	Total		98	25	—		4	0	—		—		102	25
Hebei China Fortune (Loan)	2019	Chinese Super League	10	2	—		0	0	—		—		10	2
Guangzhou Evergrande	2020	Chinese Super League	16	5	—		0	0	1	0	—		17	5
Guangzhou Evergrande	2021	Chinese Super League	1	0	—		0	0	0	0	—		1	0
Guangzhou Evergrande	Total		17	5	—		0	0	1	0	—		18	5
Shandong Taishan	2023	Chinese Super League	21	2	—		2	0	6	0	0	0	33	3
Shandong Taishan	2024	Chinese Super League	8	1	—		0	0	4	1	—		12	2
Shandong Taishan	Total		29	3	—		2	0	10	1	—		41	4
Shanghai Shenhua (loan)	2024	Chinese Super League	10	1	—		3	0	4	0	—		17	1
Career total			195	38	11	3	11	0	15	1	3	0	235	42

=== International ===
International goals by date, venue, cap, opponent, score, result and competition
No.	Date	Venue	Cap	Opponent	Score	Result	Competition
1	26 March 2024	Tianjin Olympic Center, Tianjin, China	2	Singapore	2–1	4–1	2026 FIFA World Cup qualification

== See also ==
- List of Chinese naturalized footballers
