= Bob Hurley =

American basketball coach (born 1947)

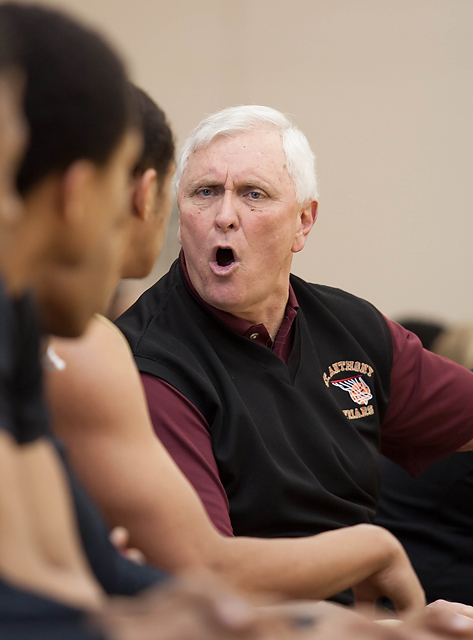

Biographical details
- Born: July 31, 1947 (age 79); Jersey City, New Jersey, U.S.

Coaching career (HC unless noted)
- 1972–2017: St. Anthony HS

Accomplishments and honors

Championships
- 4 national 26 state (1973, 1974, 1976, 1977, 1980, 1981, 1983–1991, 1993, 1995–1997, 2001, 2002, 2004, 2008, 2011, 2012, 2016)

Awards
- USA Today National Coach of the Year (1989, 1996, 2008); Best Coach/Manager ESPY Award (2017)
- Basketball Hall of Fame; Inducted in 2010 (profile)

Robert Emmet Hurley (born July 31, 1947) is an American basketball coach. At the now-closed St. Anthony High School in Jersey City, New Jersey, Hurley amassed 26 state championships in 39 years as a coach. On February 2, 2011, Hurley became the tenth coach in high school history to win 1,000 games. Five of his teams have gone undefeated.

On April 5, 2010, he was announced as the only coach to be inducted into the Naismith Memorial Basketball Hall of Fame that year and only the third high school coach in history to be so honored; he was formally inducted on August 13 of that year.

Hurley is the father of Bobby Hurley, an All-American point guard who won two national championships as a player at Duke and was the former head basketball coach at Arizona State, and Dan Hurley, who has won back to back national championships ('23-'24) as the head coach of the University of Connecticut.

== Biography ==
=== Early life ===
Hurley was born and raised in the Greenville section of Jersey City and grew up in St. Paul parish, in an era when neighborhoods identified with their parishes, later attending St. Peter's Preparatory School. His father was a police officer. Hurley attended St. Peter's College, but was cut from the varsity basketball team in his sophomore year. He began volunteering as a coach for a Catholic Youth Organization grammar school team in his parish.

=== Career ===
Hurley began coaching at St. Anthony in 1967. The school, run by Felician Sisters, had one of New Jersey's smallest student bodies, most of whom lived below or near the poverty line during the latter portion of Hurley's career.

Hurley produced over 150 players to Division I basketball programs, all on full scholarships. Hurley has coached six first-round NBA draft picks, including his own son, Bobby Hurley. Hurley's undefeated 1989 team, which featured Jerry Walker, Hurley's son Bobby, Terry Dehere, and Rodrick Rhodes, was ranked first in the nation by USA Today. Three of the players on that team – Bobby Hurley, Dehere and Rhodes – were first-round choices in the NBA draft. That team won New Jersey's first Tournament of Champions and amassed 50 straight victories in a two-year span. It is generally considered one of the best teams in American history.

Hurley's 2003–04 team, also undefeated and ranked second in the nation, is the subject of The Miracle of St. Anthony, a best-selling book by Adrian Wojnarowski. The book chronicles how the team marched to an unbeaten season, state title, and number 2 national ranking despite off-the-court crises and not having a single senior graduate to a Division I program.

Hurley's 2007–08 squad was also undefeated, finishing with 32 wins and no losses and ranked number one in the U.S. even though no starter was taller than 6 feet 6 inches. The team had six seniors who had never won a championship at the high school, something that has never happened to one of Hurley's teams. They also won Hurley's 10th Tournament of Champions, winning its state tournament games by an average of more than 27 points per game. This is considered one of the greatest basketball teams in modern sports. All six of the seniors would eventually receive Division I basketball scholarships, including Mike Rosario (Rutgers; he would later transfer to Florida), Tyshawn Taylor (Kansas), Travon Woodall (Pittsburgh), Jio Fontan (Southern California) and Dominic Cheek (Villanova). The Street Stops Here, a 2010 documentary narrated by Harry Lennix, reviewed Hurley's impact on St. Anthony's basketball and captured several compelling moments that season. It premiered nationally on PBS on March 31, 2010, and was released on DVD.

For a number of years, Hurley's teams were challenged for supremacy in the state by Saint Benedict's Preparatory School of Newark, which was coached until 2010 by his son Dan, who played for him at St. Anthony before going to Seton Hall University. In 2008, when Hurley's team was ranked number 1 in the nation, Dan's St. Benedict's squad was ranked number 2, and only a 3-point loss kept St. Benedict's from an undefeated season and a number 1 ranking of its own.

St. Anthony won 30 state championships, more than any other school in U.S. history. Hurley was the coach for 28 of those teams and an assistant coach on the other two. His teams are known for their speed, defensive intensity, and precise ball movement. Every senior to graduate from his program has won at least one state championship, with many winning several.

Over the years, Hurley has been offered a number of college coaching jobs, but has declined them all. He is also one of just a few high school coaches to be enshrined in the Naismith Memorial Basketball Hall of Fame. Hurley is considered a top 10 high school basketball coach in the history of the United States.

He remained at the school through its final basketball season of 2016–17. Shortly after that season, the school announced it would close at the end of that school year.

He was never a teacher at St. Anthony's, though during his final years there he served as president. For most of his career, he remained employed as a probation officer; he retired from that role in 2008. Thereafter, he worked for the Jersey City Recreation Department, but has since retired from that position as well. He was instrumental in the restoration of the historic Jersey City Armory to a modern sports arena.

=== Post-retirement ===
Currently, Hurley continues his mission of developing children's potential in life through the game of basketball via The Hurley Family Foundation. The Hurley Family Foundation runs a free basketball program for students in 3rd through 12th grade in Jersey City. Over 400 unique athletes participate in the clinics and each session is packed with over 75 players.

== Personal life and family ==
Hurley and his wife Christine have three children: Bobby, Dan and Melissa.
