= Tyias Browning =

Chinese footballer (born 1994)

Tyias Browning Jiang Guangtai
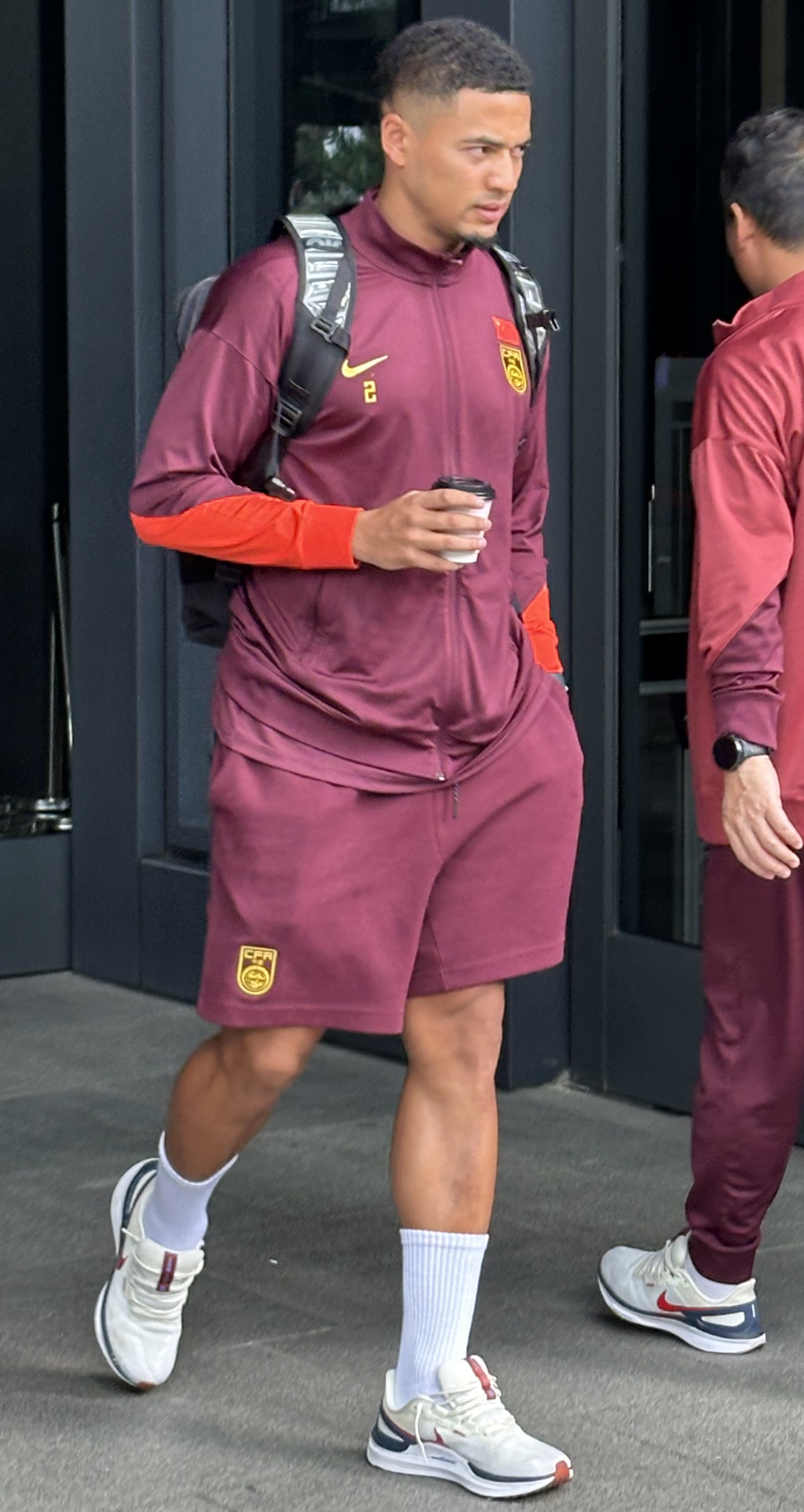
- Browning in June 2025

Personal information
- Full name: Jiang Guangtai
- Birth name: Tyias Charles Browning
- Date of birth: 27 May 1994 (age 32)
- Place of birth: Liverpool, England
- Height: 6 ft 2 in (1.88 m)
- Positions: Centre-back; right-back

Team information
- Current team: Shanghai Port
- Number: 3

Youth career
- 2004–2012: Everton

Senior career*
Years	Team	Apps	(Gls)
2012–2019	Everton	7	(0)
2014	→ Wigan Athletic (loan)	2	(0)
2017	→ Preston North End (loan)	8	(0)
2017–2018	→ Sunderland (loan)	27	(0)
2019–2022	Guangzhou FC	48	(0)
2022–	Shanghai Port	105	(5)

International career^{‡}
2010	England U17	4	(0)
2013	England U19	4	(0)
2014–2015	England U21	5	(0)
2021–	China	39	(1)
Medal record
Representing China
Men's football
EAFF Championship
Third place	2022 Japan	Team
- * Club domestic league appearances and goals as of 19 November 2026 ‡ National team caps and goals as of 23:00, 15 October 2024 (UTC)

Tyias Browning
- Chinese: 蒋光太
Transcriptions
Standard Mandarin
- Hanyu Pinyin: Jiǎng Guāngtài

Tyias Charles Browning (born 27 May 1994), known as Jiang Guangtai (Chinese: 蒋光太; pinyin: Jiǎng Guāngtài) in China, is a professional footballer who plays as a defender for Chinese Super League club Shanghai Port. Born in England, he plays for the China national team.

In addition to playing as a centre-back, Browning can also play as a right-back.

== Early life ==
Tyias Charles Browning was born in Liverpool, Merseyside, England. He attended the same school as his future Wigan Athletic teammates Lee Nicholls and Jack Phillips.

He is eligible to play for the China national team because his maternal grandfather Ying-Wing Chiang (1939–1992), a chef in Macclesfield, England, was Cantonese, having emigrated from Meige Village, Xinhui County, China. Chiang married a Black British woman. In 2019, Browning became a naturalised Chinese citizen, benefiting from the Chinese football naturalisation policies. He later changed his name to Jiang Guangtai.

== Club career ==
=== Everton ===
Browning joined Everton in 2004 at the age of ten. Prior to that, he started at the local team for eight months before joining Everton. After progressing through the youth team for Everton, Browning began to play in the club's reserve, where he became a regular. He then helped Everton Reserves win the U18 Premier League title in the 2010–11 season.

Browning developed at the club's reserves, playing in the right–back position for the side throughout his time there. Browning also received a captain armband for the club's reserves, as he develops. At the end of the 2013–14 season, Browning won the Under-21s Player of the Season at the club's end of season awards night.

On 30 December 2012, he was called up to the first team for the first time as an unused substitute as Everton lost 2–1 to Chelsea. On 26 July 2013, Browning signed his first professional contract with the club, keeping him until 2015.

In the 2014–15 season, Browning signed a three–year contract, keeping him until 2017. He made his debut for Everton's senior squad on 27 September 2014 at Anfield for the Merseyside Derby against Liverpool, coming on as a substitute to replace long-time Everton servant Tony Hibbert after 72 minutes with the scoreline 1–0 to Liverpool, as the game ended 1–1. Browning made another appearance in a follow–up match against Manchester United on 5 October 2014, coming on as a substitute to replace Hibbert again, in a 2–1 loss. Two months later, on 11 December 2014, he made his first start for the side, starting the whole game, in a 1–0 loss against Krasnodar. At the end of the 2014–15 season, Browning made three appearances in all competitions.

In the 2014–15 season, Browning made his first appearance of the season, coming on as a late substitute to replace Brendan Galloway, in a 3–0 win over Southampton on 15 August 2015. He then received a handful of first team appearances for the side this season. In one of the match against Swansea City on 19 September 2015, Browning was named Team of the Week after helping the side draw 0–0, keeping a clean sheet in the process. However, he suffered a knee injury during the club's win over Blackburn Rovers in the Lancashire Senior Cup, and was sidelined for the rest of the 2015–16 season.

After being sidelined for a long time, Browning returned to full fitness, playing 45 minutes, as Everton U23 lost 4-1 by Norwich City in the Premier League Cup in November 2016. He was then featured in the EFL Trophy against Blackpool, in a 5–4 defeat in the penalty shoot-out after the game was finished with a 1–1 draw on 8 November 2016. Despite returning to fitness, he was told by the club's management that he was to be loaned out for the rest of the 2016–17 season. After his loan spell at Sunderland ended, Browning was expected to be loaned out again, but the move failed to materialise. It was announced in January 2019 that Browning was expected to leave Everton, with his departure being imminent.

==== Wigan Athletic loan ====
Browning joined Uwe Rösler's Wigan Athletic on a one-month loan on 10 January 2014. He made his professional debut a day later versus AFC Bournemouth in a 3–0 victory, replacing James Perch as a substitute. In a follow–up match, Browning then started the whole game as a right–back, as Wigan Athletic lost 3–0 against Doncaster Rovers, in what turned out to be his last appearance for the club. Afterwards, he returned to his parent club, Everton.

==== Preston North End loan ====
Browning signed a new two-and-a-half-year deal at Everton and was then immediately sent on loan to Preston North End until the end of the 2016–17 season on 30 January 2017. The following day, he made his Preston North End debut, starting the whole game, in a 2–0 loss against Cardiff City. Browning became a first team regular for the side, playing in the right–back position in a number of matches. This lasted until he suffered a knee injury that kept him out for two months. He made his return to the starting lineup on 24 April 2017 against Newcastle United, where they lost 4–1. At the end of the 2016–17 season, having made eight appearances for Preston North End, Browning returned to his parent club.

==== Sunderland loan ====
On 8 July 2017, Browning joined relegated side Sunderland on a season long-deal, where he was reunited with Manager Simon Grayson, who played under him while at Preston North End. He made his Sunderland debut in the opening game of the season, where he started the whole game, in a 1–1 draw against Derby County. Since making his Sunderland debut, Browning established himself in the starting eleven for the side, playing in the centre–back position. However, Sunderland soon found themselves struggling in the league that saw them at the bottom of the table. After being sidelined with an injury that kept him out throughout October, he returned to the first team as a late substitute against Millwall on 18 November 2017. Browning continued to feature in the first team under the new management of Chris Coleman. Under Coleman, Browning's performance improved, where he kept four clean sheets for the side. Browning continued to feature in the first team until he suffered a groin injury during a 3–0 loss against Aston Villa on 6 March 2018 and was sidelined for the rest of the season. Without him, Sunderland struggled in the league for the rest of the season, leading to their relegation to League One. At the end of the 2017–18 season, Browning went on to make twenty–nine appearances in all competitions.

=== Guangzhou FC ===
On 20 February 2019, Browning transferred to Chinese Super League club Guangzhou Evergrande for an undisclosed fee, which was believed to be in the region of €4.6m. On 5 March 2019, he made his debut for the club in a 2–0 home win over Japanese side Sanfrecce Hiroshima in the 2019 AFC Champions League. Due to the fact that Chinese Super League's policies on naturalised players were still vague and incomplete at the time, Browning could only be registered as a foreign player for the first half of the 2019 season and his league registration had to be cancelled in the 2019 summer transfer window after the club re-signed fellow naturalised player Elkeson, therefore he could only train with the reserve team for the second half of the season. Manager Fabio Cannavaro admitted in a press conference that the situation with Browning confused him too as he stated that the club only signed him because they expected him to be used as a Chinese player. The team went on to win the 2019 Chinese Super League and Browning was still eligible to receive a medal as he made 4 league appearances in the first half of the season. After the policy became more complete in the following year and the formalities were completed, Browning returned to the team as a Chinese player for the 2020 season.

=== Shanghai Port ===
On 24 August 2022, Browning joined fellow Chinese Super League club Shanghai Port. On 20 September 2022, Browning made his Shanghai Port debut and scored his first career goal in a 2–1 away win at Henan Songshan Longmen. On 29 October 2023, Browning won his second league title and first one with Shanghai Port after a 1–1 home draw against direct competitor Shandong Taishan.

== International career ==
=== Youth ===
Browning has represented England at under-17, under-19, and under-21 level. In addition to playing for England, he is eligible to play for China.

In 2010, Browning was featured four times for England U17s, including being called up for the Nordic Tournament.

In March 2013, Browning was called up by England U19s for the first time, making his debut for the side in a 1–0 win over Turkey U19s. He went on to make four appearances for the U19 side.

In May 2014, Browning was called up to the under-21 squad for the first time. On 22 May 2014 Browning made his England U21 debut, playing the whole game in a 3–0 win over Qatar U21.

=== Senior ===
Browning received his first call-up to the Chinese national team in 2020, but had to wait until their 2022 FIFA World Cup qualifying match against Guam on 30 May 2021 to make his international debut. On 20 June 2023, Browning scored his first international goal in a 2–0 home win against Palestine in an international friendly game.

Browning was named in China's squad for the 2023 AFC Asian Cup in Qatar and started the team's opening match against Tajikistan on 13 January 2024.

== Career statistics ==
=== Club ===
As of match played 22 November 2025

Appearances and goals by club, season and competition
Club	Season	League			National cup (Note: Includes FA Cup, Chinese FA Cup)		League cup (Note: Includes EFL Cup)		Continental		Other		Total	
Club	Season	Division	Apps	Goals	Apps	Goals	Apps	Goals	Apps	Goals	Apps	Goals	Apps	Goals
Everton	2012–13	Premier League	0	0	0	0	0	0	—		—		0	0
Everton	2013–14	Premier League	0	0	0	0	0	0	—		—		0	0
Everton	2014–15	Premier League	2	0	0	0	0	0	1 (Note: Appearance in UEFA Europa League)	0	—		3	0
Everton	2015–16	Premier League	5	0	0	0	1	0	—		—		6	0
Everton	2018–19	Premier League	0	0	0	0	0	0	—		—		0	0
Everton	Total		7	0	0	0	1	0	1	0	—		9	0
Wigan Athletic (loan)	2013–14	Championship	2	0	0	0	0	0	—		—		2	0
Preston North End (loan)	2016–17	Championship	8	0	0	0	0	0	—		—		8	0
Sunderland (loan)	2017–18	Championship	27	0	1	0	1	0	—		—		29	0
Guangzhou Evergrande/ Guangzhou FC	2019	Chinese Super League	4	0	1	0	—		8 (Note: Appearances in AFC Champions League)	0	—		13	0
Guangzhou Evergrande/ Guangzhou FC	2020	Chinese Super League	17	0	0	0	—		4	0	—		21	0
Guangzhou Evergrande/ Guangzhou FC	2021	Chinese Super League	19	0	0	0	—		0	0	—		19	0
Guangzhou Evergrande/ Guangzhou FC	2022	Chinese Super League	8	0	0	0	—		0	0	—		8	0
Guangzhou Evergrande/ Guangzhou FC	Total		48	0	1	0	—		12	0	—		61	0
Shanghai Port	2022	Chinese Super League	15	2	2	0	—		—		—		17	2
Shanghai Port	2023	Chinese Super League	24	1	1	0	—		1	0	—		26	1
Shanghai Port	2024	Chinese Super League	28	1	3	0	—		3 (Note: Appearances in AFC Champions League Elite)	0	0	0	34	1
Shanghai Port	2025	Chinese Super League	22	0	2	0	—		6	0	1 (Note: Appearance in Chinese Super Cup)	0	31	0
Shanghai Port	2026	Chinese Super League	0	0	0	0	—		0	0	0	0	0	0
Shanghai Port	Total		89	4	8	0	—		10	0	1	0	108	4
Career total			181	4	10	0	2	0	23	0	1	0	217	4

=== International ===
China PR
Year	Apps	Goals
2021	9	0
2022	5	0
2023	6	1
2024	12	0
2025	3	0
2026	4	0
Total	39	1

No.	Date	Venue	Opponent	Score	Result	Competition
1	20 June 2023	Dalian Barracuda Bay Football Stadium, Dalian, China	Palestine	2–0	2–0	Friendly

== Honours ==
=== Club ===
Guangzhou Evergrande

- Chinese Super League: 2019

Shanghai Port

- Chinese Super League: 2023, 2024, 2025
- Chinese FA Cup: 2024

== See also ==
- List of Chinese naturalized footballers
