= Tournament of Champions (NJSIAA) =

New Jersey sports tournament

The New Jersey State Interscholastic Athletic Association Tournament of Champions (NJSIAA TOC) or more commonly referred to as the T of C, was a sports tournament for New Jersey high schools that determined which high school would be crowned as the #1 overall team in the state for each sport. It took the state champions from each group (see external links) and matched them up against one another, regardless of school size or enrollment status (public or private), to determine the top overall team in New Jersey.

== Structure ==
Certain steps needed to be taken in order to qualify for the TOC. First, a high school needed to qualify for the state playoffs by accumulating a .500 or better win percentage for the season before the cut-off date. This would enter them into the sectional tournament of the state playoffs. Next, the team needed to win all of its playoff games through the sectionals and into the state tournament. Only when a high school won the state championship for their respective group would they be able to participate in the Tournament of Champions.

Not all high school sports in New Jersey offered a TOC. For boys, the tournament was offered in basketball (established in 1989), cross country, lacrosse (since 2004), tennis, and indoor / outdoor track. No soccer or football TOCs existed due to the length of those seasons, which often conflicted with the start of winter sports. For girls, the sports were basketball (since 1989), cross country, field hockey (since 2006), lacrosse (2007), softball (2017), tennis, indoor / outdoor track, and volleyball.

For some sports, there were no group championships. All schools, public and non-public, competed for the state championship. For the boys it was bowling, fencing, golf, and volleyball. For the girls it was bowling, fencing, golf, and gymnastics.

== Abolition ==
In November 2021, the NJSIAA's executive committee passed a first reading that would end the Tournament of Champions starting in the 2022-23 season, as part of an effort to allow teams greater ability to schedule games and to allow schools and teams to end their season as winners. The proposal to abolish the T of C was well met by the State's field hockey and basketball coaches, the former nearly unanimously, and the latter two to one in favor of abolition of the tournament, arguing that the tournaments were usually dominated by three or so powerhouse teams and that most teams sought their bracket's state championship instead. In the second reading on December 8, 2021, the NJSIAA's executive committee voted 33-4 with two abstentions to abolish the T of C.

Men's lacrosse programs, players, coaches, and parents across the state vehemently opposed the abolition of the T of C, and upon its abolition ignored NJSIAA's ruling and held their own at the end of the 2022-2023 season called the Kirst Cup.
