= 2026 Shanghai Shenhua F.C. season =

Shanghai Shenhua
- Chairman: Gu Jiqing
- Head coach: Leonid Slutsky (till 13 Aug); Vladan Milojević
- Stadium: Shanghai Stadium
- Top goalscorer: League: Rafael Ratão (20 goals); All: Rafael Ratão (20 goals)
Home colours	Away colours

2026 Shanghai Shenhua F.C. season
- Traditional Chinese: 上海申花足球俱樂部
- Simplified Chinese: 上海申花足球俱乐部
Transcriptions
Standard Mandarin
- Hanyu Pinyin: Shànghǎi Shēnhuā Zúqiú Jùlèbù

The 2026 Shanghai Shenhua season is Shanghai Shenhua's 26th season in the Chinese Super League and 64th overall in the Chinese top flight. They also compete in the Chinese FA Cup, the 2025–26 AFC Champions League Elite and the 2026–27 AFC Champions League Elite.

== Squad ==
As of 24 Feb 2025

No.	Name	Nationality	Date of birth (age)	Previous club	Contract since	Contract end
Goalkeepers
1	Xue Qinghao	(China)	26 September 2000 (age 26)	(China) Nantong Zhiyun	2021	
24	Ma Zhen	(China)	1 June 1998 (age 28)	(China) Yunnan Yukun	2021	
31	Wang Hanyi	(China)	17 February 2005 (age 21)	(China) Qingdao West Coast	2021	
Defenders
2	Wang Shilong	(China)	7 March 2001 (age 25)	(China) Guangzhou	2025	
3	Jin Shunkai	(China)	19 October 2001 (age 25)	(China) Shanghai Shenhua U19	2023	
4	Jiang Shenglong	(China)	24 December 2000 (age 25)	(China) Chongqing Liangjiang Athletic	2018	
5	Zhu Chenjie	(China)	23 August 2000 (age 26)	(China) Shanghai Shenhua U19	2018	2026
6	Li Songyi	(China)	27 January 1993 (age 33)	(China) Yunnan Yukun	2026	
13	Wilson Manafá	(Portugal) (Guinea-Bissau)	23 July 1994 (age 32)	(Spain) Granada CF	2024	2026
16	Yang Zexiang	(China)	14 December 1994 (age 31)	(China) Chengdu Rongcheng	2022	
25	Zhu Yue	(China)	4 May 2001 (age 25)	(China) Guangxi Pingguo	2020	
27	Shinichi Chan	(Hong Kong) (Japan)	5 September 2002 (age 24)	(Hong Kong) Kitchee SC	2024	
28	Yang Shuai	(China)	28 January 1997 (age 29)	(China) Chengdu Rongcheng	2026	
38	Wu Qipeng	(China)	28 February 2007 (age 19)	(China) Shanghai Shenhua U21	2024	
46	He Bizhen	(China)	2 May 2003 (age 23)	(China) Shanghai Shenhua U21	2025	
48	Zhang Bin	(China)	10 January 2005 (age 21)	(China) Shanghai Shenhua U21	2025	
Midfielders
8	Nico Yennaris	(China) (England)	24 May 1993 (age 33)	(China) Beijing Guoan	2025	2026
10	João Carlos Teixeira	(Portugal)	18 January 1993 (age 33)	(Qatar) Umm Salal SC	2023	2026
15	Wu Xi	(China)	19 February 1989 (age 37)	(China) Jiangsu Suning	2021	2026
17	Gao Tianyi	(China)	1 July 1998 (age 28)	(China) Beijing Guoan	2024	
20	Yu Hanchao	(China)	25 February 1987 (age 39)	(China) Guangzhou Evergrande	2020	
21	Xu Haoyang	(China)	15 January 1999 (age 27)	(China) Shanghai Shenhua U19	2018	
30	Xie Pengfei	(China)	29 June 1993 (age 33)	(China) Wuhan Three Towns	2024	
33	Wang Haijian	(China)	2 August 2000 (age 26)	(China) Shanghai Shenhua U21	2019	
36	Huang Ming	(China)	28 May 2005 (age 21)	(China) Shanghai Jiading Huilong		
42	Li Tingwei	(China)	30 October 2004 (age 22)	(China) Shanghai Shenhua U21		
43	Yang Haoyu	(China)	25 May 2006 (age 20)	(China) Shanghai Shenhua U21	2025	
45	Han Jiawen	(China)	28 June 2004 (age 22)	(China) Shanghai Shenhua U21	2024	
49	He Linhan	(China)	29 June 2004 (age 22)	(China) Shanghai Shenhua U21	2024	
Strikers
9	Rafael Ratão	(Brazil)	30 November 1995 (age 30)	(Japan) Cerezo Osaka	2026	
18	Liu Chengyu	(China)	2 July 2006 (age 20)	(China) Shanghai Shenhua U21	2024	
19	Luis Nlavo	(Equatorial Guinea)	9 July 2001 (age 25)	(Spain) Leganés	2025	
29	Makhtar Gueye	(Senegal)	4 December 1997 (age 28)	(England) Blackburn Rovers	2026	
40	Hu Mingyu	(China)	27 October 2006 (age 20)	(China) Shanghai Shenhua U21	2025	
	Zhang Wei	(China)	16 May 2000 (age 26)	(China) Guangxi Pingguo	2023	
Players who left on loan
37	Marcel Petrov	(China) (Slovenia)	20 March 2006 (age 20)	(Slovenia) Olimpija	2025	
44	Liu Haoran	(China)	20 February 2005 (age 21)	(China) Shanghai Shenhua U19	2023	
47	He Quan	(China)	30 September 2004 (age 22)	(China) Shanghai Shenhua U21	2025	
Players who left mid-season
11	Saulo Mineiro	(Brazil)	17 June 1997 (age 29)	(Brazil) Ceará	2025	

== Transfer ==
=== In ===
Pre-Season

Date	Position	Player	Transferred from	Ref
Permanent Transfer
1 January 2026	GK	(China) Ma Zhen	(China) Yunnan Yukun	End of loan
1 January 2026	GK	(China) Wang Hanyi	(China) Qingdao West Coast	End of loan
1 January 2026	DF	(China) Zhu Yue	(China) Suzhou Dongwu	End of loan
1 January 2026	DF	(China) Jiang Zhixin	(China) Suzhou Dongwu	End of loan
1 January 2026	DF	(China) Wang Yifan	(China) Suzhou Dongwu	End of loan
1 January 2026	DF	(China) Zhu Qiwen	(China) Nanjing City	End of loan
1 January 2026	DF	(China) Wang Hao	(China) Dalian K'un City	End of loan
1 January 2026	DF	(China) Huang Ming	(China) Shanghai Jiading Huilong	End of loan
1 January 2026	MF	(China) Zhou Junchen	(China) Changchun Yatai	End of loan
1 January 2026	FW	(China) Zhang Wei	(China) Tianjin Jinmen Tiger	End of loan
1 January 2026	FW	(China) Fei Ernanduo	(China) Guangxi Hengchen	End of loan
2 January 2026	FW	(Brazil) Rafael Ratão	(Brazil) Bahia	Undisclosed
6 January 2026	DF	(China) Yang Shuai	(China) Chengdu Rongcheng	Free
13 January 2026	FW	(Senegal) Makhtar Gueye	(England) Blackburn Rovers	Undisclosed
3 March 2026	DF	(China) Jiang Yixiang	(Serbia) Grafičar Beograd U19	Undisclosed
Loan Transfer

Mid-Season

Date	Position	Player	Transferred from	Ref
Permanent Transfer
31 May 2026	FW	(Equatorial Guinea) Luis Nlavo	(Spain) Leganés	End of loan
4 July 2026	DF	(China) Li Songyi	(China) Yunnan Yukun	Undisclosed

=== Out ===
Pre-Season

Date	Position	Player	Transferred to	Ref
Permanent Transfer
28 December 2025	FW	(China) Yu Hanchao	Retired	N.A.
31 December 2025	GK	(China) Zhou Zhengkai	(China) Shanghai Jucheng	Free
31 December 2025	DF	(China) Cui Lin	(China)	Free
31 December 2025	DF	(China) (Tanzania) Eddy Francis	(China) Ningbo Huaao	Free
31 December 2025	MF	(China) Zhou Junchen	(China) Qingdao Hainiu	Free
3 January 2026	FW	(Brazil) André Luis	(Brazil) Mirassol	Free
5 January 2026	GK	(China) Bao Yaxiong	(China) Yunnan Yukun	Free
5 January 2026	FW	(China) Fei Ernanduo	(China) Yunnan Yukun	Free
8 January 2026	GK	(China) Liu Yujie	(China) Guizhou Zhucheng	Free
13 January 2026	FW	(China) (Hong Kong) (England) Dai Wai Tsun	(China) Shenzhen Peng City	Free
6 February 2026	DF	(China) He Xin	(China) Changchun Yatai	Free
6 February 2026	FW	(France) Ibrahim Amadou	(China) Chongqing Tonglianglong	Free
Loan Transfer
28 January 2026	FW	(Equatorial Guinea) Luis Nlavo	(Spain) Leganés	Season loan
28 February 2026	FW	(China) Marcel Petrov	(China) Jiangxi Dingnan United	Season loan
28 February 2026	GK	(China) Liu Haoran	(China) Shenzhen Juniors	Season loan
28 February 2026	DF	(China) Zhu Qiwen	(China) Nanjing City	Season loan
28 February 2026	DF	(China) He Quan	(China) Jiangxi Lushan	Season loan
28 February 2026	FW	(China) Wang Yifan	(China) Wuxi Wugo	Season loan

Mid-Season

Date	Position	Player	Transferred to	Ref
Permanent Transfer
8 September 2026	FW	(Brazil) Saulo Mineiro	(Brazil) Ceará	

== Friendlies ==
=== Pre-Season Friendly ===
Win Draw Loss

17 January 2025 1	Shanghai Shenhua (China)	0–0	(Latvia) FK Auda	Dubai, UAE
		Report

20 January 2025 2	Shanghai Shenhua (China)	1–2	(South Korea) Ulsan HD	Dubai, UAE
			Liu Chengyu

23 January 2025 3	Shanghai Shenhua (China)	2–2 (3–5 p)	(Russia) Dynamo Moscow	Dubai, UAE
	Rafael Ratão 2'; Wu Xi 45+2'		Bitello 4'; Ivan Sergeyev 46'

26 January 2025 4	Shanghai Shenhua (China)	1–1	(Russia) Rodina Moscow	Dubai, UAE
	Makhtar Gueye 36'		21'

=== Mid-Season Friendly ===
27 September 2026 5	Shanghai Shenhua (China)	–	(Russia) Zenit St Petersburg	Shanghai, China

== Statistics ==
=== Appearances and goals ===
As of 8 November 2026

No.	Nat.	Name	Chinese Super League		Chinese FA Cup		2025–26 AFC Champions League		2026–27 AFC Champions League Two		Total	
No.	Nat.	Name	Apps.	Goals	Apps.	Goals	Apps.	Goals	Apps.	Goals	Apps.	Goals
1	GK	(China) Xue Qinghao	30	0	3	0	2	0	1	0	36	0
2	DF	(China) Wang Shilong	1+6	0	0+1	0	0	0	0+2	0	10	0
3	DF	(China) Jin Shunkai	18+2	2	1	0	2	0	3+1	0	27	2
4	DF	(China) Jiang Shenglong	2+1	0	0	0	0	0	2	0	5	0
5	DF	(China) Zhu Chenjie	28	4	2	0	2	0	0	0	32	4
6	DF	(China) Li Songyi	6+3	0	2	0	0	0	1+2	0	14	0
8	MF	(China) (England) Nico Yennaris	2+2	0	0	0	2	0	0	0	5	0
9	FW	(Brazil) Rafael Ratão	29	20	3	0	2	0	2+1	1	37	21
10	MF	(Portugal) João Carlos Teixeira	17+3	5	2	0	2	0	3+1	0	28	5
13	DF	(Portugal) (Guinea-Bissau) Wilson Manafá	26	0	3	0	2	0	2+2	0	35	0
15	MF	(China) Wu Xi	28+1	5	3	0	2	0	1	0	35	5
16	DF	(China) Yang Zexiang	9+16	1	2+1	0	0+1	0	4	0	33	1
17	MF	(China) Gao Tianyi	27+2	2	3	1	0+2	0	3+1	0	38	3
18	FW	(China) Liu Chengyu	4+9	0	0	0	0+1	0	2	0	16	0
19	FW	(Equatorial Guinea) Luis Nlavo	15	8	3	4	0	0	4	0	22	12
21	MF	(China) Xu Haoyang	8+17	2	1+2	0	0	0	4	1	32	3
24	GK	(China) Ma Zhen	0	0	0	0	0	0	2	0	2	0
26	DF	(China) Yang Shuai	4+9	1	0	0	0	0	3+1	1	17	2
27	DF	(Hong Kong) (Japan) Shinichi Chan	26+1	3	2	0	2	0	1	0	32	3
29	FW	(Ivory Coast) Makhtar Gueye	7	5	0	0	2	0	0	0	9	5
30	FW	(China) Xie Pengfei	12+16	3	1+2	0	0	0	1+3	0	35	3
33	MF	(China) Wang Haijian	22+7	1	2	0	0	0	4	0	35	1
36	DF	(China) Huang Ming	0	0	0+1	0	0	0	0	0	1	0
38	MF	(China) Wu Qipeng	4+6	0	0+1	0	0+1	0	0+1	0	13	0
42	DF	(China) Li Tingwei	0	0	0	0	0	0	0	0	0	0
43	DF	(China) Yang Haoyu	4+12	1	0+1	0	0+1	0	0+1	0	19	1
45	MF	(China) Han Jiawen	0+4	1	0+1	0	0+1	0	0+3	0	9	1
46	DF	(China) He Bizhen	0	0	0	0	0	0	0	0	0	0
48	DF	(China) Zhang Bin	0	0	0	0	0	0	0	0	0	0
Players who have left on loan
37	FW	(China) (Slovenia) Marcel Petrov	0	0	0	0	0	0	0	0	0	0
44	GK	(China) Liu Haoran	0	0	0	0	0	0	0	0	0	0
47	DF	(China) He Quan	0	0	0	0	0	0	0	0	0	0
Players who left permanently
11	FW	(Brazil) Saulo Mineiro	2+6	2	0+1	0	2	0	0	0	11	2

== Competitions ==
=== Chinese Super League ===
7 March 2026 1	Shanghai Shenhua	5–3	Dalian Yingbo	Shanghai
	João Carlos Teixeira 8'; Makhtar Gueye 45', 63'; Rafael Ratão 45+4', 88'; Jin Shunkai (yellow card) 24'		Cephas Malele 5'; Frank Acheampong 82'; Feng Jin 90' (yellow card) 90+2'; Wen Jia Bao (yellow card) 6'; Liao Jintao (yellow card) 70'	Stadium: Shanghai Stadium; Referee: Dai Yige

14 March 2026 2	Zhejiang	1–1	Shanghai Shenhua	Hangzhou
	Wang Yudong 68'; Liu Haofan (yellow card) 45'; Park Jin-seop (yellow card) 78'		João Carlos Teixeira 10' (yellow card) 40'; Rafael Ratão (yellow card) 36'; Yang Haoyu (yellow card) 62' (yellow-red card) 90+1'	Stadium: Huanglong Sports Center Stadium; Referee: Gan Shuran

21 March 2026 3	Beijing Guoan	1–1	Shanghai Shenhua	Beijing
	Zhang Yuning 24'; Fabio Abreu (yellow card) 45'; Abdugheni Abduhamit (yellow card) 67'	Report	Shinichi Chan 69'; Wang Shilong (yellow card) 45'; Gao Tianyi (yellow card) 75'; Yang Zexiang (yellow card) 86'	Stadium: Workers' Stadium; Attendance: 64,118; Referee: Ma Ning

5 April 2026 4	Tianjin Jinmen Tiger	2–3	Shanghai Shenhua	Tianjin
	Guilherme Schettine 43' (pen.); Alberto Quiles 58'		Zhu Cenjie 45+5'; Rafael Ratão 81', 90+1' (pen.) (yellow card) 90+6'; Liu Chengyu (yellow card) 79'	Stadium: TEDA Soccer Stadium; Referee: He Xin

11 April 2026 5	Shanghai Shenhua	1–0	Shanghai Port	Shanghai
	Rafael Ratão 52'; Yang Haoyu (yellow card) 66'; Shinichi Chan (yellow card) 90+1'; Yang Zexiang (yellow card) 90+6'		Lu Yongtao (yellow card) 26'; Yang Shiyuan (yellow card) 71'	Stadium: Shanghai Stadium; Referee: Li Hai Xin

18 April 2026 6	Shanghai Shenhua	3–1	Liaoning Tieren	Shanghai
	Rafael Ratão 9', 39'; Jin Shunkai 17'		Tian Yuda 88'; Yan Dinghao (yellow card) 90+1'	Stadium: Shanghai Stadium; Referee: Ren Tong

22 April 2026 7	Shanghai Shenhua	2–0	Qingdao Hainiu	Shanghai
	João Carlos Teixeira 47' (yellow card) 22'; Makhtar Gueye 53'; Gao Tianyi (yellow card) 60'; Wang Haijian (yellow card) 85'; Xu Haoyang (yellow card) 90+8'		Liu Junshuai (yellow card) 15'; Ngan Cheuk Pan (yellow card) 21'; Nemanja Andjelkovic (yellow card) 45+3'; Song Long (yellow card) 60'	Stadium: Shanghai Stadium; Referee: Liang Songshang

26 April 2026 8	Henan	0–3	Shanghai Shenhua	Zhengzhou
	Ekber Osman (yellow card) 82'		Wu Xi 40' (pen.); Shinichi Chan 64'; Makhtar Gueye 70'	Stadium: Hanghai Stadium; Referee: Wang Jing

1 May 2026 9	Shanghai Shenhua	2–3	Chengdu Rongcheng	Shanghai
	Shinichi Chan 16'; Makhtar Gueye 38' (yellow card) 68'; Wu Xi (yellow card) 24'; João Carlos Teixeira (yellow card) 42'		Felipe 45', 90+2'; Wellington Silva 90+6' (yellow card) 90+8'; Wei Shihao (yellow card) 32'; Han Pengfei (yellow card) 60'	Stadium: Shanghai Stadium; Referee: Ma Ning

5 May 2026 10	Shandong Taishan	4–1	Shanghai Shenhua	Jinan
	Zeca 24'; Cryzan 26', 52', 73'; Guilherme Madruga (yellow card) 90+6'		Rafael Ratão 63'; Liu Chengyu (yellow card) 43'; Gao Tianyi (yellow card) 56'	Stadium: Jinan Olympic Sports Center Stadium; Referee: Shan Dan'ao

9 May 2026 11	Shanghai Shenhua	2–2	Chongqing Tonglianglong	Shanghai
	Zhu Cenjie 66', 74' (yellow card) 90+3'; Gao Tianyi (yellow card) 43'; Jin Shunkai (yellow card) 79'; Yang Zexiang (yellow card) 86'; Wilson Manafá (red card) 90+4'		Nany Dimata 9'; Alexandru Cîmpanu 30'; Zhang Zhixiong (yellow card) 90+6'	Stadium: Shanghai Stadium; Referee: Wang Jing

16 May 2026 12	Yunnan Yukun	1–0	Shanghai Shenhua	Yuxi
	Shinichi Chan 16'; Makhtar Gueye 38'; Oscar Maritu 65'; Andrei Burca (yellow card) 78'		Wu Xi (yellow card) 33'	Stadium: Yuxi Plateau Sports Center Stadium; Referee: Liang Songshang

20 May 2026 13	Shanghai Shenhua	2–2	Wuhan Three Towns	Shanghai
	Xu Haoyang 6'; Rafael Ratao 36' (yellow card) 56'; Gao Tianyi (yellow card) 45+2'		Gustavo Sauer 43'; Jhonder Cadiz 73' (yellow card) 37'; Wang Kang (yellow card) 50'; Wei Long (yellow card) 78'; Adriano (yellow card) 80'	Stadium: Shanghai Stadium; Referee: Zhang Yang Fan

24 May 2026 14	Shanghai Shenhua	1–2	Shenzhen Peng City	Shanghai
	Rafael Ratão 23' (pen.); Yang Zexiang (yellow card) 16'; Shinichi Chan (yellow card) 69'; Wang Shilong (yellow card) 90+5'		Albion Ademi 4'; Eden Kartsev 16' (pen.); Yu Rui (yellow card) 28'	Stadium: Shanghai Stadium; Referee: Ai Kun

30 May 2026 15	Qingdao West Coast	2–2	Shanghai Shenhua	Qingdao
	Yakubu 45+1' (pen.); Davidson 49'; Rezende (yellow card) 8'; Wang Peng (yellow card) 29'; Shinichi Chan (yellow card) 45+4'		Wu Xi 3'; Zhu Chenjie 73' (yellow card) 45'; Gao Tianyi (yellow card) 23'; Shinichi Chan (yellow card) 45+4'	Stadium: Qingdao West Coast University City Sports Center; Referee: Memetjan Ahmet

28 June 2026 16	Dalian Yingbo	1–4	Shanghai Shenhua	Dalian
	Nicolae Stanciu 9'		Wu Xi 25' (pen.); Luis Asue 7' (yellow card) 32'; Rafael Ratão 58', 90'; Wang Haijian (yellow card) 60'	Stadium: Dalian Suoyuwan Football Stadium

5 July 2026 17	Shanghai Shenhua	3–2	Zhejiang	Shanghai
	Wu Xi 19', 51'; Rafael Ratão 86' (pen.)		Wang Yudong 66'; Marko Tolic 79'; Tong Lei (yellow card) 44'; Zhang Aihui (yellow card) 72'	Stadium: Shanghai Stadium; Referee: Yan Lifu

18 August 2026 18 (Rescheduled)	Shanghai Shenhua	0–3	Beijing Guo'an	Shanghai
	Wu Xi (yellow card) 14'; Li Songyi (yellow card) 68'		Guilherme Ramos 42'; Cao Yongjing 73' (yellow card) 74'; Zhang Xizhe 86'; Dawhan (yellow card) 49'; Hou Sen (yellow card) 83'; Li Lei (yellow card) 84'	Stadium: Shanghai Stadium

18 July 2026 19	Shanghai Shenhua	0–2	Tianjin Jinmen Tiger	Shanghai
			Xadas 74'; Alberto Quiles Piosa 81'; Yang Fan (yellow card) 14'; Wu Xinghan (yellow card) 79'	Stadium: Shanghai Stadium; Referee: Li Hai Xin

25 July 2026 20	Shanghai Port	2–0	Shanghai Shenhua	Shanghai
	Leonardo 28'; Li Xinxiang 36'; Kodjo Aziangbe (yellow card) 18'; Wang Zhenao (yellow card) 90+2'		Yang Zexiang (yellow card) 90+3'	Stadium: Pudong Football Stadium

2 August 2026 21	Liaoning Tieren	3–1	Shanghai Shenhua	Shenyang
	Jeffinho 9', 86'; Takahiro Kunimoto 32' (pen.); Yuan Mincheng (yellow card) 90+9'		Saulo Mineiro 71' (pen.) (yellow card) 90+8'; Yang Zexiang (yellow card) 23'; Joao Carlos Teixeira (yellow card) 45+5'; Li Songyi (yellow card) 53'	Stadium: Tiexi Stadium

8 August 2026 22	Qingdao Hainiu	0–1	Shanghai Shenhua	Qingdao
	Liu Junshuai (yellow card) 82'; Yonghao Jin (yellow card) 90+9'		Xu Haoyang 54'	Stadium: Qingdao Youth Football Stadium

15 August 2026 23	Shanghai Shenhua	4–1	Henan	Shanghai
	Rafael Ratão 45+2'; Luis Asue 57'; Gao Tianyi 71'; Saulo Mineiro 83'		Zhong Yihao 5'; Wang Shangyuan (yellow card) 40'; Abdurasul Abudulam (yellow card) 90'	Stadium: Shanghai Stadium

22 August 2026 24	Chengdu Rongcheng	4–5	Shanghai Shenhua	Chengdu
	He Yi Ran 2'; Wellington Silva 35'; Felipe Silva 82' (pen.), 90+2' (pen.); Han Pengfei (yellow card) 90+9'		Luis Asue 21', 51', 67'; Rafael Ratão 52'; Xie Pengfei 75'; Xue Qinghao (yellow card) 79'; Zhu Chenjie (yellow card) 90+7'	Stadium: Phoenix Hill Football Stadium

28 August 2026 25 (Rescheduled)	Shanghai Shenhua	2–3	Shandong Taishan	Shanghai
	Rafael Ratão 41'; Luis Asue 45+2'		Maiwulang Mijiti 1'; Cryzan 79' (pen.); Raphael Merkies 83'; Zeca (yellow card) 50'; Yang Ruiqi (yellow card) 59'; Gao Zhunyi (yellow card) 89'	Stadium: Shanghai Stadium

6 September 2026 26	Chongqing Tonglianglong	1–3	Shanghai Shenhua	Chongqing
	Michael Ngadeu-Ngadjui 90+4'; Ibrahim Amadou (yellow card) 45+3'		Luis Asue 8'; Gao Tianyi 12'; Yang Haoyu 85'; Yang Zexiang (yellow card) 19'	Stadium: Tongliang Long Stadium

10 October 2026 27	Shanghai Shenhua	7–1	Yunnan Yukun	Shanghai
	Rafael Ratão 12', 57', 75'; Xie Pengfei 43'; Jin Shunkai 53'; Wang Haijian 62'; Liu Chengyu 81'		Cleber 31'; Wang Kit Tsui (yellow card) 61'	Stadium: Shanghai Stadium

18 October 2026 28	Wuhan Three Towns	1–3	Shanghai Shenhua	Wuhan
	Jhonder Cadiz 62'; Li Shenyuan (yellow card) 60'; Xu Haofeng (yellow card) 89'		Luis Asue 2' (yellow card) 43'; Rafael Ratão 67' (pen.); Han Jiawen 90'; Zhu Chenjie (yellow card) 45'	Stadium: Wuhan Sports Center

24 October 2026 29	Shenzhen Peng City	2–1	Shanghai Shenhua	Shenzhen
	Dai Wai-Tsun 46'; Wesley 90+2' (pen.); Deabeas Owusu (yellow card) 90+7'; Yu Rui (yellow card) 90+15'		Yang Shuai 63'; Rafael Ratão (penalty missed) 90+16; Joao Carlos Teixeira (yellow card) 45'; Wilson Manafa (yellow card) 80'	Stadium: Shenzhen Sports Center Stadium

8 November 2026 30	Shanghai Shenhua	4–0	Qingdao West Coast	Shanghai
	João Carlos Teixeira 53' (pen.), 83'; Xie Pengfei 57'; Yang Zexiang 89'		Zhang Chengdong (yellow card) 22'; Alexander Xie (yellow card) 62'	Stadium: Shanghai Stadium

Pos	Team	Pld	W	D	L	GF	GA	GD	Pts
5	Shanghai Port (Note: Shanghai Port had 5 points deducted for violation of sports ethics and loss of sportsmanship, engaging in improper transactions to seek illegitimate benefits.)	30	14	8	8	56	37	+19	45
6	Yunnan Yukun	30	12	7	11	59	61	−2	43
7	Shanghai Shenhua (Note: Shanghai Shenhua had 10 points deducted for violation of sports ethics and loss of sportsmanship, engaging in improper transactions to seek illegitimate benefits.)	30	15	5	10	67	50	+17	40
8	Qingdao West Coast	30	8	15	7	32	42	−10	39
9	Zhejiang (Note: Zhejiang had 5 points deducted for violation of sports ethics and loss of sportsmanship, engaging in improper transactions to seek illegitimate benefits.)	30	12	6	12	55	54	+1	37

Source: Soccerway
Rules for classification:
- During season: 1) Points; 2) Head-to-head points; 3) Head-to-head goal difference; 4) Head-to-head goals scored; 5) Goal difference; 6) Goals scored; 7) Rankings in the previous season. (Rules 2 to 4 are only applied when teams concerned have finished both/all the matches against others.)
- After season: 1) Points; 2) Head-to-head points; 3) Head-to-head goal difference; 4) Head-to-head goals scored; 5) Goal difference; 6) Goals scored; 7) Disciplinary points (yellow card = 1 point, red card = 3 points); 8) Drawing of lots.
  Notes:

#AAAAAA}}

=== Chinese FA Cup ===
20 June 2026 Round 4	Shijiazhuang Gongfu (2)	0-2	Shanghai Shenhua	Shijiazhuang
19:30 UTC+8			Luís Asué 11'; Xie Pengfei 88'	Stadium: Yutong International Sports Center

21 July 2026 Round 5	Shanghai Shenhua	4–1	Qingdao Hainiu	Shanghai
	Luís Asué 8', 17', 43'; Gao Tianyi 28'		Yaw Yeboah 3'; Sun Zheng'ao (yellow card) 40'	Stadium: Shanghai Stadium

1 September 2026 Quarter Final	Dalian Yingbo	1–0	Shanghai Shenhua	Dalian
	Nicolae Stanciu 54' (pen.); Huang Zihao (red card) 8'		João Carlos Teixeira (yellow card) 12'; Li Songyi (yellow card) 17'; Saulo Mineiro (red card) 78'; Luís Asué (yellow card) 84'	Stadium: Dalian Suoyuwan Football Stadium

=== 2025–26 AFC Champions League Elite ===
==== League stage ====
16 September 2025 MD 1	Gangwon FC (South Korea)	2–1	(China) Shanghai Shenhua	Gangneung, South Korea
	Hong Chul 54'; Goo Bon-cheul 64'	Report	João Carlos Teixeira 45+1'; Yu Hanchao (yellow card) 78'; Eddy Francis (yellow card) 82'	Stadium: Gangneung Stadium; Attendance: 4,091; Referee: Ammar Ebrahim Mahfoodh (Bahrain)

1 October 2025 MD 2	Shanghai Shenhua (China)	1–1	(South Korea) Ulsan HD FC	Shanghai, China
	Luis Nlavo 48'	Report	Gustav Ludwigson 62'; Seo Myung-gwan (yellow card) 60'; Choi Seok-hyeon (yellow card) 75'	Stadium: Shanghai Stadium; Attendance: 30,645; Referee: Yusuke Araki (Japan)

22 October 2025 MD 3	Shanghai Shenhua (China)	2–0	(South Korea) FC Seoul	Shanghai, China
	Luis Nlavo 58'; André Luis 89'	Report	Kim Jin-su (yellow card) 26'; Ryu Jae-moon (yellow card) 45'	Stadium: Shanghai Stadium; Attendance: 20,427; Referee: Abdullah Jamali (Kuwait)

5 November 2025 MD 4	Johor Darul Ta'zim (Malaysia)	3–1	(China) Shanghai Shenhua	Johor, Malaysia
	Jonathan Silva 48', 88'; Óscar Arribas 63' (yellow card) 58'; Shane Lowry (yellow card) 59'; Eddy Israfilov (yellow card) 74'	Report	Saulo Mineiro 71' (pen.) (yellow card) 82'; Xu Haoyang (yellow card) 68'; André Luís (yellow card) 75'; João Carlos Teixeira (yellow card) 82'; Wilson Manafá (yellow card) 90+7'	Stadium: Sultan Ibrahim Stadium; Attendance: 20,218; Referee: Adham Makhadmeh (Jordan)

26 November 2025 MD 5	Shanghai Shenhua (China)	0–2	(Japan) Vissel Kobe	Shanghai, China
	André Luís (penalty missed) 82; Shinichi Chan (yellow card) 56'; João Teixeira (yellow card) 63'; Saulo Mineiro (yellow card) 77'	Report	Yosuke Ideguchi 31'; Tetsushi Yamakawa 39'; Yuki Honda (yellow card) 3'; Yuya Kuwasaki (yellow card) 10'; Tetsushi Yamakawa (yellow card) 47'	Stadium: Shanghai Stadium; Attendance: 12,487; Referee: Kim Jong-Hyeok (South Korea)

10 December 2025 MD 6	Sanfrecce Hiroshima (Japan)	1–0	(China) Shanghai Shenhua	Sanfrecce, Japan
	Hayato Araki 78'; Ryo Germain (yellow card) 76'	Report	Shinichi Chan (yellow card) 16'; Wu Xi (yellow card) 68'; Ibrahim Amadou (yellow card) 70'	Stadium: Edion Peace Wing Hiroshima; Attendance: 13,240; Referee: Ahmad Al-Ali (Kuwait)

10 February 2026 MD 7	Shanghai Shenhua (China)	0–2	(Japan) FC Machida Zelvia	Shanghai, China
	Jin Shunkai (yellow card) 2'; Makhtar Gueye (yellow card) 34'	Report	Yuki Soma 3' (pen.), 88'	Stadium: Shanghai Stadium; Attendance: 16,158; Referee: Omar Al-Ali (United Arab Emirates)

17 February 2026 MD 8	Buriram United (Thailand)	2–0	(China) Shanghai Shenhua	Buriram, Thailand
	Curtis Good 11'; Suphanat Mueanta 22'; Robert Žulj (yellow card) 31'	Report	Rafael Ratão (yellow card) 31' (yellow-red card) 35'; Liu Chengyu (yellow card) 88'	Stadium: Chang Arena; Attendance: 15,971; Referee: Abdulrahman Al-Jassim (Qatar)

Pos	Team	Pld	W	D	L	GF	GA	GD	Pts	Qualification
8	(South Korea) Gangwon FC	8	2	3	3	9	11	−2	9	Advance to round of 16
9	(South Korea) Ulsan HD	8	2	3	3	6	8	−2	9	
10	(China) Chengdu Rongcheng	8	1	3	4	7	11	−4	6	
11	(China) Shanghai Shenhua	8	1	1	6	5	13	−8	4	
12	(China) Shanghai Port	8	0	4	4	2	11	−9	4	

Source: AFC
Rules for classification: 1) points; 2) goal difference; 3) number of goals scored; 4) number of matches won; 5) penalty shoot-out if only two teams remain tied and played each other on the final matchday 6) fair play ranking; 7) drawing of lots

=== 2026–27 AFC Champions League Two ===
Pos	Team	Pld	W	D	L	GF	GA	GD	Pts	Qualification	MCZ	PKR	SHS	TAM
1	(Japan) Machida Zelvia (A)	4	4	0	0	6	1	+5	12	Advance to round of 16	—	2–0	2–1	–
2	(Cambodia) PKR Svay Rieng	4	2	1	1	7	3	+4	7	Advance to round of 16	–	—	0–0	2–0
3	(China) Shanghai Shenhua	4	1	1	2	3	4	−1	4		0–1	–	—	2–1
4	(Singapore) Tampines Rovers (E)	4	0	0	4	2	10	−8	0		0–1	1–5	–	—

Updated to match(es) played on 5 November 2026. Source: ACL2
Rules for classification: Tiebreakers
(A) Advance to a further round; (E) Eliminated

Win Draw Loss

17 September 2026 1	Shanghai Shenhua (China)	2–1	(Singapore) Tampines Rovers	Shanghai, China
	Xu Haoyang 20'; Yang Shuai 62'	Report	Faris Ramli 33'; Jacob Mahler (yellow card) 57'; Seiga Sumi (yellow card) 68'; Shah Shahiran (yellow card) 83'	Stadium: Shanghai Stadium; Attendance: 24,024; Referee: Mooud Bonyadifard (Iran)

15 October 2026 2	PKR Svay Rieng (Cambodia)	0–0	(China) Shanghai Shenhua	Phnom Penh, Cambodia
	Tiago Alves (yellow card) 9'; Soeuy Visal (yellow card) 54'; Johannes Tartarotti (yellow card) 68'; Barbosa (yellow card) 83'	Report	Jin Shunkai (yellow card) 64'; Wilson Manafá (yellow card) 84'	Stadium: Morodok Techo National Stadium; Attendance: 6,274; Referee: Ali Al Ashkar (Lebanon)

29 October 2026 3	Shanghai Shenhua (China)	0–1	(Japan) Machida Zelvia	Shanghai, China
	Xie Pengfei (yellow card) 77'	Report	Ryōhei Shirasaki 28'	Stadium: Shanghai Stadium; Attendance: 20,698; Referee: Payam Heydari (Iran)

5 November 2026 4	Machida Zelvia (Japan)	2–1	(China) Shanghai Shenhua	Machida, Japan
	Hokuto Shimoda 29'; Keiya Sento 78'; Takahiro Akimoto 65'; Mitch Duke (yellow card) 21'	Report	Rafael Ratão 59'; Luís Asué (yellow card) 48'; Xu Haoyang (yellow card) 90+4'	Stadium: Machida Stadium; Attendance: 3,474; Referee: Qasim Al-Hatmi (Oman)

26 November 2026 5	Tampines Rovers (Singapore)	–	(China) Shanghai Shenhua	Jalan Besar, Singapore
		Report		Stadium: Jalan Besar Stadium

3 December 2026 6	Shanghai Shenhua (China)	–	(Cambodia) PKR Svay Rieng	Shanghai, China
		Report		Stadium: Shanghai Stadium
