= 2023 Chinese FA Cup =

CFA Cup
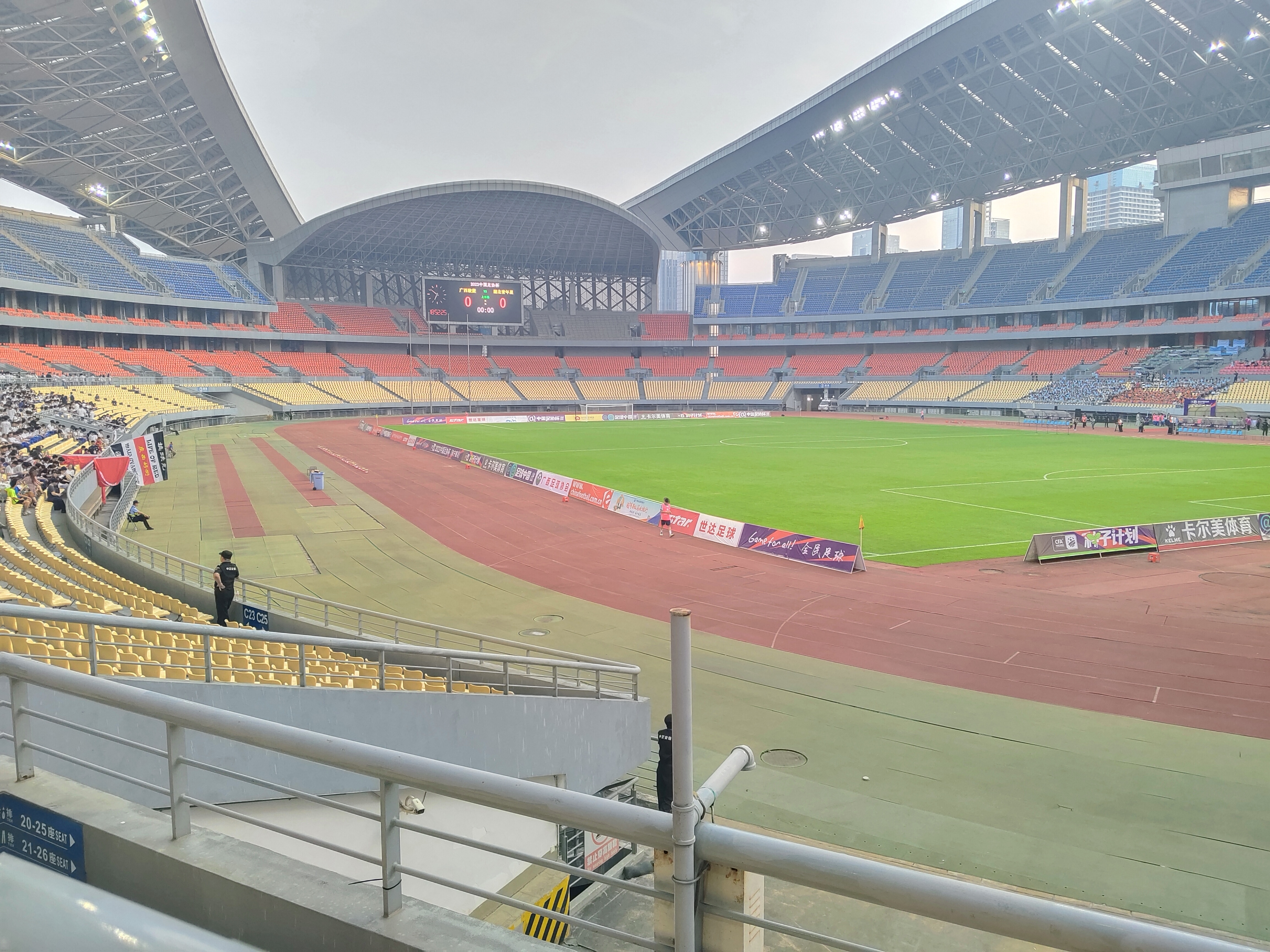
- The opening match of the 2023 Chinese FA Cup at the Guangxi Sports Center

Tournament details
- Country: China
- Dates: 17 May – 25 November 2023
- Teams: 64

Final positions
- Champions: Shanghai Shenhua (6th title)
- Runners-up: Shandong Taishan
- AFC Champions League Elite: Shanghai Shenhua

Tournament statistics
- Matches played: 63
- Goals scored: 167 (2.65 per match)
- Attendance: 244,349 (3,879 per match)

The 2023 Chinese Football Association Cup (Chinese: 2023中国足球协会杯) was the 25th edition of the Chinese FA Cup. 64 teams participated in the competition, 16 Super League teams, 16 League One teams, 16 League Two teams and 16 amateur teams. The draw for the 2023 Chinese FA Cup will be held on 5 May 2023. On 4 May 2023, Chinese Football Association published the list of amateur teams competing in the competition.

The three-time defending champions were Chinese Super League side Shandong Taishan, but they were defeated 1-0 in the final by Shanghai Shenhua, who won their 6th title.

== Schedule ==
The Chinese Football Association announced the schedule of 2023 Chinese FA Cup on 7 April 2023.

Round	Draw date	Match dates	Clubs remaining	Clubs involved	Winners from previous round	New entries this round	New Entries Notes
First round	5 May 2023	17–20 May 2023	64	32	none	32	16 2023 China League Two teams 16 amateur teams
Second round	5 May 2023	30–31 May 2023	48	32	16	16	16 2023 China League One teams
Third round	5 May 2023	22–25 June 2023	32	32	16	16	16 2023 Chinese Super League teams
Fourth round	5 May 2023	25–26 July 2023	16	16	16	none	
Quarter-finals	5 May 2023	30–31 August 2023	8	8	8	none	
Semi-finals	5 May 2023	26 September 2023; 7 November 2023	4	4	4	none	
Final	5 May 2023	25 November 2023	2	2	2	none	

== First round ==
17 May 2023	Wuhan Xiaoma (4)	0–3	Guangxi Lanhang (3)	Xinhua Road Sports Center, Wuhan
15:30 UTC+8		Report	Zhang Chenlong 15'; Li Endian 34'; Wu Jialong 37'	Attendance: 0 Referee: Gao Peng

17 May 2023	Shanghai Zhongchen (A)	1–1 (3–5 p)	Quanzhou Yassin (3)	Jinshan Sports Centre, Shanghai
15:30 UTC+8	Du Hailang 90+3'	Report	Li Yalun 86'	Attendance: 80; Referee: Jiao Zi

17 May 2023	Guangxi Junling Feisu (4)	0–5	Hubei Istar (3)	Guangxi Sports Centre Stadium, Nanning
19:30 UTC+8		Report	Yu Guizhe 2'; Wang Jiaqi 3'; Wang Ziankang 40'; Yang Boyue 52', 90+1'	Attendance: 4,788; Referee: Jia Zhiliang

17 May 2023	Qingdao May Wind (4)	0–1	Yunnan Yukun (3)	Guzhenkou University City Sports Center, Qingdao
19:30 UTC+8		Report	Liu Wenqing 3'	Attendance: 368; Referee: Zhang Yi

18 May 2023	Yiwu Jinxiu (4)	0–0 (1–4 p)	Zibo Qisheng (3)	Yiwu Meihu Sports Centre, Yiwu
15:30 UTC+8		Report		Attendance: 268; Referee: Chen Sijian

18 May 2023	Fuzhou Changle Jingangtui (4)	0–1	Beijing BIT (3)	Fuzhou Changle Nanshan Sports Center, Fuzhou
15:30 UTC+8		Report	Hu Jiaqi 87'	Attendance: 568; Referee: Zhou Xiao

18 May 2023	Ili Jiucheng (4)	1–2	Shaoxing Shangyu Pterosaur (3)	Kuytun Sports Center, Kuytun
18:00 UTC+8	Abdumijit Yarmemet 82'	Report	Zhang Tong 73'; Meng Zhen 90+5'	Attendance: 2,571; Referee: Zhang Long

18 May 2023	Rizhao Yuqi (4)	1–6	Chongqing Tonglianglong (3)	Rizhao International Football Center, Rizhao
19:30 UTC+8	Zhao Yuan 89'	Report	Li Zhenquan 6'; Hu Yongfa 30'; Xiang Yuwang 34', 86'; Chen Jiaqi 39'; Li Jiajun 82' (o.g.)	Attendance: 3,897; Referee: Su Zihao

19 May 2023	Shanxi Longchengren (4)	0–1	Qingdao Red Lions (3)	Shanxi Nationwide Fitness Centre Stadium, Taiyuan
15:30 UTC+8		Report	Huang Xuheng 89'	Attendance: 1,558; Referee: Hu Tengfei

19 May 2023	Tianjin Jinchengren (4)	0–1	Dalian Zhixing (3)	Haihe Educational Football Stadium, Tianjin
15:30 UTC+8		Report	Ge Yuxiang 61'	Attendance: 183; Referee: Ma Teng

19 May 2023	Xi'an Chongde Ronghai (4)	1–1 (1–4 p)	Hainan Star (3)	Yan'an Nationwide Fitness Centre Stadium, Yan'an
19:30 UTC+8	Sun Zhaoliang 68'	Report	Ke Ziang 8'	Attendance: 538; Referee: Yang Chunyu

20 May 2023	Changzhou Lanyi (A)	1–2	Wuhan Jiangcheng (3)	Changzhou Olympic Sports Centre, Changzhou
15:30 UTC+8	Li Feiyang 22'	Report	Wei Jingzong 67'; Li Yueming 90+3'	Attendance: 3,126; Referee: Cheng Wei

20 May 2023	Inner Mongolia Caoshangfei (4)	0–4	Hunan Billows (3)	Baotou Olympic Sports Center, Baotou
15:30 UTC+8		Report	Jiang Zhe 25' (pen.); Sun Fei 30'; Sun Qi 83'; Wang Bo 87'	Attendance: 4,820; Referee: Liang Ming

20 May 2023	Qujing EB (4)	0–1	Jiangxi Dark Horse Junior (3)	Qujing Cultural and Sports Park, Qujing
15:30 UTC+8		Report	Erpanjan Aniwar 1'	Attendance: 2,967; Referee: Wu Can

20 May 2023	Shanghai Shenshui (A)	0–1	Nantong Haimen Codion (3)	Shanghai Qingpu Sports Center, Shanghai
15:30 UTC+8		Report	Yin Hanlong 6'	Attendance: 320; Referee: Yang Lei

20 May 2023	Ningxia Fangzhong (4)	0–2	Tai'an Tiankuang (3)	Helan Mountain Stadium, Yinchuan
15:30 UTC+8		Report	Wang Haisheng 3'; Wang Bohan 81'	Attendance: 1,532; Referee: Xue Xiangsheng

== Second round ==
30 May 2023	Quanzhou Yassin (3)	1–2	Yanbian Longding (2)	Jinjiang Football Training Center Stadium, Jinjiang
15:30 UTC+8	Ilaldin Abdugheni 31' (pen.)	Report	Xu Bo 47'; Han Guangmin 90+2'	Attendance: 356; Referee: Wang Minjie

30 May 2023	Jiangxi Dark Horse Junior (3)	1–3	Qingdao West Coast (2)	Dingnan Youth Football Training Center Stadium, Dingnan
15:30 UTC+8	Geng Taili 67'	Report	Xie Longfei 16'; Zhang Tianlong 90+1'; Li Kai 90+3'	Attendance: 1,316; Referee: Dan Ning

30 May 2023	Zibo Qisheng (3)	1–1 (5–4 p)	Jinan Xingzhou (2)	Qidu Cultural Sports City Stadium, Zibo
15:30 UTC+8	Zhao Xiaotian 45'	Report	Sang Yifei 62'	Attendance: 0 Referee: Kou Jianxun

30 May 2023	Dalian Zhixing (3)	1–1 (5–6 p)	Dongguan United (2)	Jinzhou Stadium, Dalian
15:30 UTC+8	Zhao Xuebin 82'	Report	Ruan Jun 90+6'	Attendance: 521; Referee: Yi Jiajin

30 May 2023	Heilongjiang Ice City (2)	3–0	Shaoxing Shangyu Pterosaur (3)	Harbin ICE Sports Center, Harbin
19:30 UTC+8	Zhang Zimin 29'; Ular Muhtar 56'; Tang Shi 58'	Report		Attendance: 6,328; Referee: Liu Yang

30 May 2023	Yunnan Yukun (3)	2–0	Guangxi Pingguo Haliao (2)	Yuxi Highland Sports Center Stadium, Yuxi
19:30 UTC+8	Li Biao 23'; Zhong Haoran 57'	Report		Attendance: 9,582; Referee: Ma Yunkun

31 May 2023	Beijing BIT (3)	0–1	Nanjing City (2)	BIT Eastern Athletic Field, Beijing
15:00 UTC+8		Report	Huang Zhenfei 76'	Attendance: 318; Referee: Mu Fupeng

31 May 2023	Wuhan Jiangcheng (3)	0–0 (4–5 p)	Guangzhou (2)	Hankou Cultural Sports Centre, Wuhan
15:30 UTC+8		Report		Attendance: 513; Referee: Guo Xiang

31 May 2023	Guangxi Lanhang (3)	0–2	Wuxi Wugo (2)	Liuzhou Sports Centre, Liuzhou
15:30 UTC+8		Report	Sun Rui 46'; Li Wenyong 85'	Attendance: 356; Referee: Wang Xiao

31 May 2023	Hunan Billows (3)	1–0	Shanghai Jiading Huilong (2)	Loudi Sports Center, Loudi
15:30 UTC+8	Wu Qinghua 90+4'	Report		Attendance: 10,286; Referee: Gan Shuran

31 May 2023	Qingdao Red Lions (3)	1–1 (2–4 p)	Suzhou Dongwu (2)	Guzhenkou University City Sports Center, Qingdao
15:30 UTC+8	Wei Zhenghong 11'	Report	Dong Honglin 90+3'	Attendance: 465; Referee: Chen Jindong

31 May 2023	Hainan Star (3)	1–2	Jiangxi Lushan (2)	Haikou Mission Hills Football Training Base Stadium, Haikou
15:30 UTC+8	Luo Kui 41'	Report	Zhang Xiang 75'; Deng Jiaxing 78'	Attendance: 88; Referee: Liang Songshang

31 May 2023	Nantong Haimen Codion (3)	2–0	Liaoning Shenyang Urban (2)	Haimen Sports Centre, Nantong
15:30 UTC+8	Qi Dan 23'; Zheng Lei 90+1'	Report		Attendance: 1,313; Referee: Cui Yong

31 May 2023	Tai'an Tiankuang (3)	3–3 (4–5 p)	Sichuan Jiuniu (2)	Tai'an Sports Center, Tai'an
15:30 UTC+8	Cao Sheng 22'; Tian Xin 55' (pen.); Song Hua 78'	Report	Wang Qi 14'; Xia Dalong 30', 60'	Attendance: 2,274; Referee: Gu Zhongchao

31 May 2023	Hubei Istar (3)	1–4	Dandong Tengyue (2)	Xinhua Road Sports Center, Wuhan
16:00 UTC+8	Yan Xinyu 47'	Report	Lü Yuefeng 12'; Yao Diran 20', 63'; Liu Zhizhi 42'	Attendance: 240; Referee: Niu Minghui

31 May 2023	Chongqing Tonglianglong (3)	3–0	Shijiazhuang Gongfu (2)	Tongliang Long Stadium, Chongqing
19:30 UTC+8	Li Zhenquan 3'; Hu Yongfa 35'; Xiang Yuwang 66'	Report		Attendance: 8,656; Referee: Du Jianxin

== Third round ==
22 June 2023	Yanbian Longding (2)	0–2	Dalian Pro (1)	Yanji Nationwide Fitness Centre Stadium, Yanji
15:30 UTC+8		Report	Shang Yin 61'; Tsonev 46'	Attendance: 7,633; Referee: Niu Minghui

22 June 2023	Sichuan Jiuniu (2)	1–4	Zhejiang (1)	Chengdong Sports Park Stadium, Chengdu
16:30 UTC+8	Nan Song 46'; Li Zhi (yellow card) 75' (yellow-red card) 90'	Report	Ewolo 16'; Cheng Jin 18'; Gao Di 36'; Li Tixiang 44'	Attendance: 0 Referee: Zhang Xiaochen

22 June 2023	Hunan Billows (3)	0–1	Henan (1)	Loudi Sports Center, Loudi
17:30 UTC+8		Report	Song Runtong 24'	Attendance: 8,565; Referee: He Kai

22 June 2023	Suzhou Dongwu (2)	1–1 (2–4 p)	Meizhou Hakka (1)	Kunshan Sports Centre Stadium, Kunshan
19:30 UTC+8	Wu Lei 77'	Report	Cui Wei 65'	Attendance: 1,775; Referee: Zhen Wei
	Penalties
	Gao Dalun (penalty missed); Wu Lei (penalty scored); Zhang Lingfeng (penalty scored); Liang Weipeng (penalty missed)		(penalty scored) Rodrigo Henrique; (penalty scored) Yang Yihu; (penalty scored) Cui Wei; (penalty scored) Chen Zhechao

22 June 2023	Nanjing City (2)	3–4	Changchun Yatai (1)	Nanjing Youth Olympic Sports Park, Nanjing
19:30 UTC+8	Duan Yunzi 55'; Jefferson 64'; Masika 90'	Report	Leonardo 9'; Serginho 72', 73'; Cao Yongjing 88'	Attendance: 3,068; Referee: Du Jianxin

23 June 2023	Zibo Qisheng (3)	0–1	Beijing Guoan (1)	Zibo Sports Center Stadium, Zibo
17:00 UTC+8		Report	Yang Liyu 8'	Attendance: 0 Referee: Zhang Long

23 June 2023	Jiangxi Lushan (2)	1–5	Wuhan Three Towns (1)	Ruichang Sports Park Stadium, Ruichang
17:00 UTC+8	Weslley 76'	Report	Aziz 24', 55'; Wallace 28'; Xia Xiaoxi 75'; Yan Dinghao 80' (pen.)	Attendance: 10,263; Referee: Liang Songshang

23 June 2023	Qingdao West Coast (2)	2–1	Cangzhou Mighty Lions (1)	Guzhenkou University City Sports Center, Qingdao
19:30 UTC+8	Tian Yong 17'; Guo Yi 46'	Report	Wang Peng 35'	Attendance: 4,028; Referee: Gu Chunhan

23 June 2023	Dandong Tengyue (2)	1–1 (2–4 p)	Qingdao Hainiu (1)	Huludao City Sports Centre Stadium, Huludao
19:30 UTC+8	Yao Diran 90'	Report	Zheng Long 14'	Attendance: 5,098; Referee: Chen Jindong
	Penalties
	Li Chenguang (penalty missed); Yao Diran (penalty missed); Lü Yuefeng (penalty scored); Liu Zhizhi (penalty scored)		(penalty scored) Zheng Long; (penalty missed) Zhong Jinbao; (penalty scored) Liu Weicheng; (penalty scored) Chen Chunxin; (penalty scored) Liu Chaoyang

23 June 2023	Chongqing Tonglianglong (3)	0–0 (4–2 p)	Chengdu Rongcheng (1)	Tongliang Long Stadium, Chongqing
19:30 UTC+8		Report		Attendance: 13,217; Referee: Ahmat Memetjan
	Penalties
	Huang Xiyang (penalty scored); Chen Jiaqi (penalty scored); Xiang Yuwang (penalty scored); Zhao Hejing (penalty missed); Chen Kerui (penalty scored)		(penalty missed) Gan Rui; (penalty missed) Tang Chuang; (penalty scored) Hu Ruibao; (penalty scored) Gou Junchen

23 June 2023	Yunnan Yukun (3)	1–2	Shanghai Shenhua (1)	Yuxi Highland Sports Center Stadium, Yuxi
19:30 UTC+8	Li Biao 57'	Report	Fei Ernanduo 87'; Yu Hanchao 90'	Attendance: 9,589; Referee: Gan Shuran

24 June 2023	Guangzhou (2)	1–3	Shanghai Port (1)	Yuexiushan Stadium, Guangzhou
17:30 UTC+8	Wang Shijie 83'	Report	Pink 50'; Lü Wenjun 77'; Li Shenglong 86'	Attendance: 8,388; Referee: Wan Tao

24 June 2023	Wuxi Wugo (2)	0–2	Tianjin Jinmen Tiger (1)	Jiangyin Stadium, Jiangyin
19:30 UTC+8		Report	Xie Weijun 57', 82'	Attendance: 1,033; Referee: Li Zheng

24 June 2023	Dongguan United (2)	1–6	Shandong Taishan (1)	Foshan Nanhai Sports Center, Foshan
19:30 UTC+8	Gong Qiule 82'	Report	Crysan 14', 42', 68'; Song Long 39'; Chen Pu 77'; Mewlan Mijit 87'	Attendance: 2,038; Referee: Huang Yi

24 June 2023	Heilongjiang Ice City (2)	0–3	Nantong Zhiyun (1)	Harbin ICE Sports Center, Harbin
19:30 UTC+8		Report	Gui Hong 4'; Zheng Haoqian 24'; Kamiran Halimurat 32'	Attendance: 9,968; Referee: Sun Shengyu

25 June 2023	Nantong Haimen Codion (3)	1–1 (5–4 p)	Shenzhen (1)	Haimen Sports Centre, Nantong
16:00 UTC+8	Qi Dan 15'	Report	Shahsat Hujahmat 57' (pen.)	Attendance: 1,813; Referee: Gao Peng
	Penalties
	Yin Hanlong (penalty scored); Zhang Dingkang (penalty scored); Cheng Xin (penalty scored); Zhu Hui (penalty scored); Ji Sangnan (penalty scored)		(penalty scored) Zhang Yuan; (penalty scored) Shahsat Hujahmat; (penalty missed) Li Ning; (penalty scored) Zhang Yuan; (penalty scored) Hu Jiajin

== Fourth round ==
25 July 2023	Tianjin Jinmen Tiger (1)	0–0 (5–3 p)	Shanghai Port (1)	TEDA Football Stadium, Tianjin
18:00 UTC+8		Report		Attendance: 25,077; Referee: Gu Chunhan
	Penalties
	Rosa (penalty scored); Xie Weijun (penalty scored); Piao Taoyu (penalty scored); Yang Fan (penalty scored); Zhao Yingjie (penalty scored)		(penalty scored) Oscar; (penalty missed) Vargas; (penalty scored) Wu Lei; (penalty scored) Wang Shenchao

25 July 2023	Dalian Pro (1)	1–1 (5–3 p)	Henan (1)	Jinzhou Stadium, Dalian
18:30 UTC+8	Zhao Jianbo 51'	Report	27' Mierzejewski	Attendance: 3,031; Referee: Ren Tong
	Penalties
	Tsonev (penalty scored); Zhao Jianbo (penalty scored); Fei Yu (penalty scored); Nuñez (penalty scored); Lin Liangming (penalty scored)		(penalty scored) Mierzejewski; (penalty scored) Dilyimit Tudi; (penalty scored) Chen Keqiang; (penalty missed) Zhong Yihao

25 July 2023	Qingdao Hainiu (1)	1–0	Changchun Yatai (1)	Qingdao Youth Football Stadium, Qingdao
19:35 UTC+8	Zheng Long 39'	Report		Attendance: 7,386; Referee: Shan Dan'ao

25 July 2023	Chongqing Tonglianglong (3)	3–0	Nantong Haimen Codion (3)	Tongliang Long Stadium, Chongqing
19:35 UTC+8	Xiang Yuwang 36', 63'; Chen Jiaqi 90+5'	Report		Attendance: 9,188; Referee: Zhang Xiaochen

25 July 2023	Shanghai Shenhua (1)	5–1	Zhejiang (1)	Shanghai Stadium, Shanghai
20:00 UTC+8	Cephas Malele 3' (pen.), 23', 65'; Zhang Wei 81', 90+1'	Report	49' Leonardo	Attendance: 20,796; Referee: Dai Yige

26 July 2023	Qingdao West Coast (2)	1–4	Beijing Guoan (1)	Guzhenkou University City Sports Center, Qingdao
19:35 UTC+8	Shi Jian 52'	Report	18', 49' Fábio Abreu; 38' Nebijan Muhmet; 73' Fang Hao	Attendance: 7,966; Referee: Ma Yunkun

26 July 2023	Meizhou Hakka (1)	0–6	Shandong Taishan (1)	Huitang Stadium, Wuhua
19:35 UTC+8		Report	1' Xie Wenneng; 10', 29' Crysan; 20', 58' Moises Lima Magalhaes; 76' Jadson	Attendance: 8,975; Referee: Xu Qiangqiang

26 July 2023	Nantong Zhiyun (1)	2–0	Wuhan Three Towns (1)	Rugao Olympic Sports Center, Rugao
19:35 UTC+8	Wang Song 72'; Castillo 84'	Report		Attendance: 5,258; Referee: Du Jianxin

== Quarter-finals ==
30 August 2023	Dalian Pro (1)	2–0	Tianjin Jinmen Tiger (1)	Jinzhou Stadium, Dalian
18:30 UTC+8	Mamba 72'; Yan Xiangchuang 86'			Referee: Shi Zhenlu

30 August 2023	Chongqing Tonglianglong (3)	0–2	Shanghai Shenhua (1)	Tongliang Long Stadium, Chongqing
19:35 UTC+8			Yu Hanchao 15'; Fei Ernanduo 43'	Attendance: 9,950; Referee: He Kai

31 August 2023	Beijing Guoan (1)	1–1 (a.e.t.) (4–5 p)	Shandong Taishan (1)	Workers' Stadium, Beijing
19:35 UTC+8	Kang Sang-woo 19'		Li Yuanyi 10'	Attendance: 50,569; Referee: Ma Ning
	Penalties
	Ngadeu-Ngadjui (penalty scored); Zhang Chengdong (penalty scored); Wang Ziming (penalty scored); Gao Tianyi (penalty scored); Kang Sang-woo (penalty missed)		Crysan (penalty scored); Moisés (penalty scored); Pato (penalty scored); Fernandinho (penalty scored); Fellaini (penalty scored)

31 August 2023	Nantong Zhiyun (1)	0–3	Qingdao Hainiu (1)	Rugao Olympic Sports Center, Rugao
19:35 UTC+8			Ma Xingyu 66'; Šarić 83', 89'	Referee: Tang Shunqi

== Semi-finals ==
26 September 2023	Dalian Pro (1)	0–2	Shandong Taishan (1)	Jinzhou Stadium, Dalian
18:30 UTC+8			Matheus Pato 27'; Marouane Fellaini 70'	Referee: Li Haixin

7 November 2023	Qingdao Hainiu (1)	0–1	Shanghai Shenhua (1)	Qingdao Youth Football Stadium, Qingdao
19:35 UTC+8			Cephas Malele 3'	Attendance: 19,856; Referee: Tang Shunqi

== Final ==
25 November 2023
16:00 UTC+8

Shanghai Shenhua (1)	1–0	Shandong Taishan (1)
Yu Hanchao 64'

Suzhou Olympic Sports Centre, Suzhou
Attendance: 31,467
Referee: Memetjan Ahmat

== Top scorers ==
Rank	Player	Club	Goals
1	(China) Xiang Yuwang	Chongqing Tonglianglong	5
1	(Brazil) Crysan	Shandong Taishan	5
3	(Switzerland) Cephas Malele	Shanghai Shenhua	4
4	(China) Yao Diran	Dandong Tengyue	3
4	(China) Yu Hanchao	Shanghai Shenhua	3
6	(Brazil) Serginho	Changchun Yatai	2
6	(China) Li Zhenquan	Chongqing Tonglianglong	2
6	(China) Yang Boyue	Hubei Istar	2
6	(China) Qi Dan	Nantong Haimen Codion	2
6	(Serbia) Šarić	Qingdao Hainiu	2
6	(China) Zheng Long	Qingdao Hainiu	2
6	(Brazil) Moises Lima Magalhaes	Nantong Haimen Codion	2
6	(China) Zhang Wei	Shanghai Shenhua	2
6	(China) Fei Ernanduo	Shanghai Shenhua	2
6	(China) Xia Dalong	Sichuan Jiuniu	2
6	(China) Xie Weijun	Tianjin Jinmen Tiger	2
6	(Ghana) Abdul-Aziz Yakubu	Wuhan Three Towns	2
6	(China) Li Biao	Yunnan Yukun	2
