= Zhu Yue =

Zhu Yue may refer to:

- Fan Zhongyan, Chinese poet, politician, philosopher, writer and military strategist
- Zhu Yue (footballer), Chinese footballer
