= Li Zhenquan =

Chinese footballer (born 2003)

Personal information
- Full name: Li Zhenquan
- Date of birth: 16 December 2003 (age 22)
- Place of birth: Rongchang County, Chongqing, China
- Height: 1.79 m (5 ft 10 in)
- Position: Midfielder

Team information
- Current team: Chongqing Tonglianglong
- Number: 8

Youth career
- –2022: Chongqing Furen High School

Senior career*
Years	Team	Apps	(Gls)
2022–	Chongqing Tonglianglong	89	(11)

International career^{‡}
2024–2026	China U23	17	(0)
Medal record
Men's football
Representing China
AFC U-23 Asian Cup
Runner-up	2026 Saudi Arabia	Team
- * Club domestic league appearances and goals as of 19 November 2026 ‡ National team caps and goals as of 22 January 2026

Li Zhenquan (simplified Chinese: 李镇全; traditional Chinese: 李鎮全; pinyin: Lǐ Zhènquán; born 16 December 2003) is a Chinese professional footballer who plays as a midfielder for Chinese Super League club Chongqing Tonglianglong.

== Early life ==
Born into a working-class family in Rongchang County, Chongqing, Li Zhenquan lived with his mother, his father, and his paternal grandparents in a rented apartment before Li turned nine years old. His mother worked as a saleswoman, selling cooking oil, while his father worked in construction.

== Club career ==
Li Zhenquan received education at the Chongqing Furen High School, where he also joined their football team, an affiliate of Beijing Renhe. In 2015, Li played as a striker and scored four goals for Chongqing Furen in a youth competition. In 2021, he participated in the 2021 National Games of China, winning a silver medal for Chongqing at the men's under-18 level. In 2022, he joined Chinese Champions League club Chongqing Tongliangloong. Li was integral to the Chongqing Tongliangloong side that eventually became runners-up of the 2022 Chinese Champions League and won promotion to the 2023 China League Two.

On 25 May 2023, Li scored his first professional goal, providing Chongqing Tonglianglong's second of their 6–1 away league victory against Jiangxi Dark Horse Junior. One week later, he scored in Chongqing Tonglinglong's Chinese FA Cup home tie against China League One side Shijiazhuang Gongfu, opening the scoring in a 3–0 win. On 5 August, he received a red card as a result of his violent conduct, and was suspended for three matches as a result. In 2023, he scored two more league goals in a total of 23 appearances in all competitions, guiding Chongqing Tonglianglong to win the 2023 China League Two title.

In the 2024 China League One season, Li Zhenquan switched from his number 53 to wear the number 8. He scored his first goal of the season on 21 April in a 4–0 victory over Foshan Nanshi. He then scored in the 2024 Chinese FA Cup, briefly helping Chongqing Tonglianglong take the lead against Chinese Super League opponent Shandong Taishan in a 6–3 defeat. During the 2024 season, Li totalled three goals in 30 appearances. For his performances throughout the season, he was shortlisted as a candidate for the league's Young Player of the Year award.

On 9 March 2025, Li Zhenquan signed a long-term contract extension that would run until the end of 2029. On 8 November 2025, Li started in the 2–0 away win against Shanghai Jiading Huilong that guaranteed Chongqing Tonglianglong second place in the 2025 season and won the club promotion to the 2026 season of the Chinese Super League.

== International career ==
In August 2017, Li Zhenquan was called up by the China U14.

In November 2024, he was included in a China youth training camp for the first time in seven years. In August 2025, Li Zhenquan was picked by the China U23 to play in three 2026 AFC U-23 Asian Cup qualification matches in September. He provided an assist for Behram Abduweli in a 10–0 victory against the Northern Mariana Islands. In November 2025, he was selected by the China U23 to participate in the 2025 Panda Cup.

== Career statistics ==
=== Club ===
As of 8 November 2025

Appearances and goals by club, season, and competition
Club	Season	League			Cup		Continental		Other		Total	
Club	Season	Division	Apps	Goals	Apps	Goals	Apps	Goals	Apps	Goals	Apps	Goals
Chongqing Tonglianglong	2022	CMCL	12	3	–		–		–		12	3
Chongqing Tonglianglong	2023	China League Two	18	3	5	2	–		–		23	5
Chongqing Tonglianglong	2024	China League One	29	2	1	1	–		–		30	3
Chongqing Tonglianglong	2025	China League One	28	3	2	0	–		–		30	3
Chongqing Tonglianglong	Total		87	11	8	3	0	0	0	0	95	14
Career total			87	11	8	3	0	0	0	0	95	14

== Honours ==
Chongqing Tonglianglong

- China League Two: 2023

China U23

- AFC U-23 Asian Cup runner-up: 2026
