= Luís Asué =

Equatoguinean footballer (born 2001)

Luis Asué
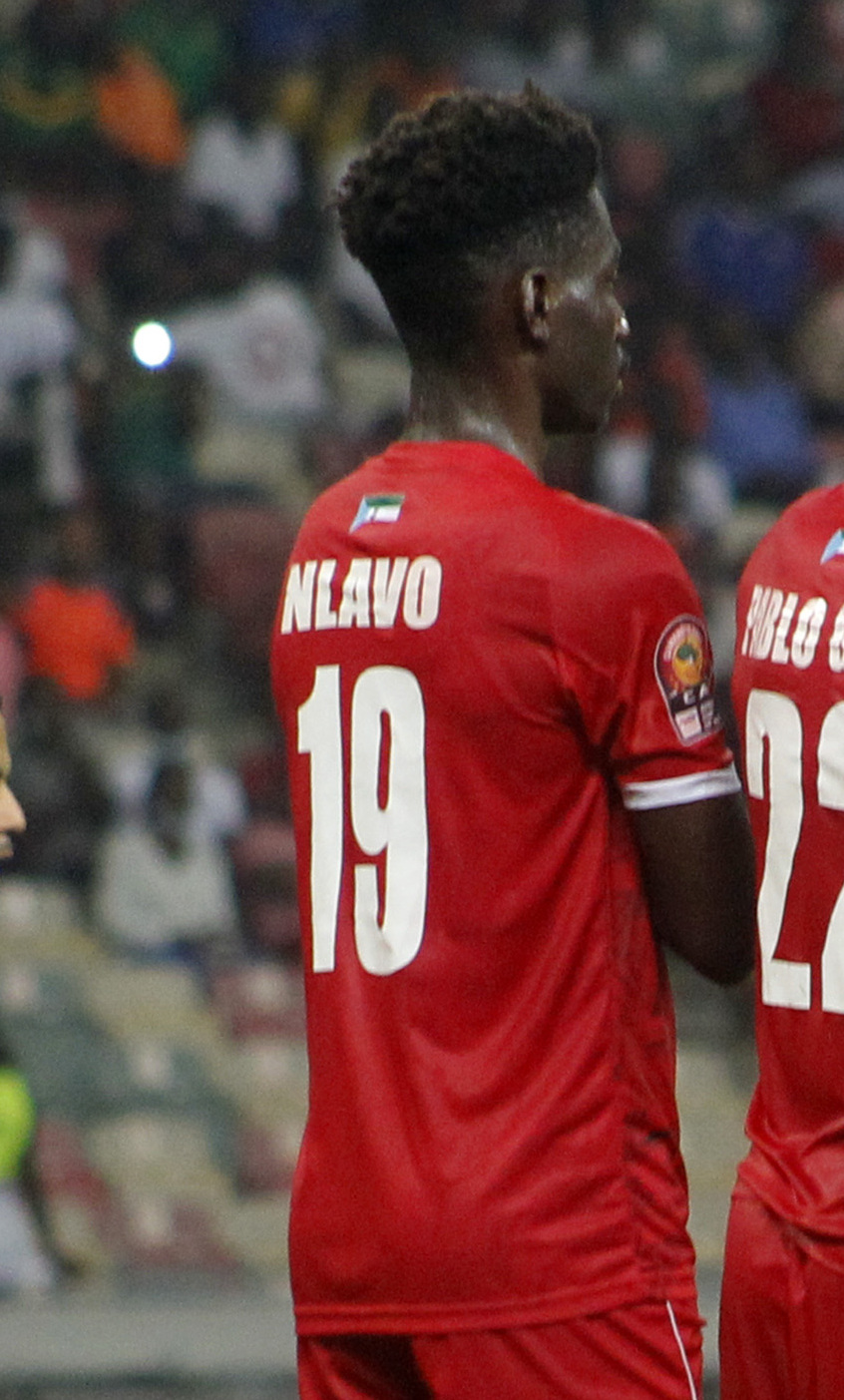
- Asué in 2022

Personal information
- Full name: Luis Miguel Nlavo Asué
- Date of birth: 9 July 2001 (age 25)
- Place of birth: Malabo, Equatorial Guinea
- Height: 1.84 m (6 ft 0 in)
- Position: Forward

Team information
- Current team: Shanghai Shenhua
- Number: 19

Youth career
- –2019: Cano Sport
- 2019–2021: Braga

Senior career*
| Years | Team | Apps | (Gls) |
| 2021–2024 | Braga B | 29 | (7) |
| 2024–2025 | Moreirense | 46 | (5) |
| 2025– | Shanghai Shenhua | 29 | (12) |
| 2026 | → Leganés (loan) | 15 | (2) |

International career^{‡}
| 2018 | Equatorial Guinea U17 | | |
| 2019– | Equatorial Guinea | 32 | (5) |
- * Club domestic league appearances and goals as of 8 November 2026 ‡ National team caps and goals as of 9 July 2026

Luis Miguel Nlavo Asué (born 9 July 2001), known in Equatorial Guinea as Luis Nlavo, is an Equatoguinean professional footballer who plays as a forward for Chinese Super League side Shanghai Shenhua, and the Equatorial Guinea national team.

== Club career ==
In January 2022, while playing in the under-23 team, Asué signed a new contract to tie himself to Braga until 2024.

On 30 January 2024, Asué left Braga and signed a four-and-a-half-year contract with fellow Primeira Liga club Moreirense.

On 24 June 2025, Asué joined Chinese Super League club Shanghai Shenhua. On 28 January 2026, he moved on loan to Leganés.

== International career ==
Aged 18, Asué made his international debut for Equatorial Guinea A' (local national team) on 28 July 2019. He scored in the third minute of a 3–3 draw away to Chad in the 2020 African Nations Championship qualification. He netted again in a 2–1 win in the second leg of the same tie.

In September 2019, he was called up for the first time to the primary Equatorial Guinea national team for 2022 FIFA World Cup qualifiers. He made his senior debut on 7 September 2021 as an 85th-minute substitution in a 1–0 home win against Mauritania.

At the 2021 Africa Cup of Nations in Cameroon, Asué was a substitute in all three group games as Equatorial Guinea reached the last 16. He was also chosen for the 2023 Africa Cup of Nations in the Ivory Coast.

== Career statistics ==
=== Club ===
As of match played 8 November 2026

Appearances and goals by club, season and competition
| Club | Season | League | | | National cup | | League cup | | Continental | | Other | | Total | |
| Club | Season | Division | Apps | Goals | Apps | Goals | Apps | Goals | Apps | Goals | Apps | Goals | Apps | Goals |
|---|---|---|---|---|---|---|---|---|---|---|---|---|---|---|
| Braga B | 2020–21 | Campeonato de Portugal | 1 | 0 | — | | — | | — | | — | | 1 | 0 |
| Braga B | 2022–23 | Liga 3 | 14 | 2 | — | | — | | — | | 2 (Note: Appearances in Liga 3 third place play-off) | 0 | 16 | 2 |
| Braga B | 2023–24 | Liga 3 | 14 | 5 | — | | — | | — | | — | | 14 | 5 |
| Braga B | Total | | 29 | 7 | — | | — | | — | | 2 | 0 | 31 | 7 |
| Moreirense | 2023–24 | Primeira Liga | 15 | 0 | — | | — | | — | | — | | 15 | 0 |
| Moreirense | 2024–25 | Primeira Liga | 31 | 5 | 3 (Note: Appearances in Taça de Portugal) | 1 | 1 (Note: Appearances in Taça da Liga) | 0 | — | | — | | 35 | 6 |
| Moreirense | Total | | 46 | 5 | 3 | 1 | 1 | 0 | — | | — | | 50 | 6 |
| Shanghai Shenhua | 2025 | Chinese Super League | 14 | 4 | 1 (Note: Appearances in Chinese FA Cup) | 1 | — | | 5 (Note: Appearances in AFC Champions League Elite) | 2 | — | | 20 | 7 |
| Shanghai Shenhua | 2026 | Chinese Super League | 15 | 8 | 3 | 4 | — | | 4 (Note: Appearances in AFC Champions League Two) | 0 | — | | 22 | 12 |
| Shanghai Shenhua | Total | | 29 | 12 | 4 | 5 | — | | 9 | 2 | — | | 42 | 19 |
| Leganés (loan) | 2025–26 | Segunda División | 15 | 2 | — | | — | | — | | — | | 15 | 2 |
| Career total | | | 119 | 26 | 7 | 6 | 1 | 0 | 9 | 2 | 2 | 0 | 138 | 34 |

=== International ===
As of 28 December 2025

Appearances and goals by national team and year
| National team | Year | Apps | Goals |
|---|---|---|---|
| Equatorial Guinea | 2019 | 2 | 2 |
| Equatorial Guinea | 2020 | – | |
| Equatorial Guinea | 2021 | 5 | 0 |
| Equatorial Guinea | 2022 | 3 | 0 |
| Equatorial Guinea | 2023 | 4 | 0 |
| Equatorial Guinea | 2024 | 13 | 3 |
| Equatorial Guinea | 2025 | 5 | 0 |
| Total | | 32 | 5 |

Scores and results list Equatorial Guinea's goal tally first.

List of international goals scored by Luís Asué
| No. | Date | Venue | Opponent | Score | Result | Competition |
|---|---|---|---|---|---|---|
| 1. | 28 July 2019 | Stade Omnisports Idriss Mahamat Ouya, N'Djamena, Chad | Chad | 1–0 | 3–3 | 2020 African Nations Championship qualification |
| 2. | 4 August 2019 | Estadio de Malabo, Malabo, Equatorial Guinea | Chad | 2–1 | 2–1 | 2020 African Nations Championship qualification |
| 3. | 22 March 2024 | Prince Abdullah Al-Faisal Sports City, Jeddah, Saudi Arabia | Cambodia | 1–0 | 2–0 | 2024 FIFA Series |
| 4. | 9 September 2024 | Estadio de Malabo, Malabo, Equatorial Guinea | Togo | 1–0 | 2–2 | 2025 Africa Cup of Nations qualification |
| 5. | 14 October 2024 | Samuel Kanyon Doe Sports Complex, Monrovia, Liberia | Liberia | 1–0 | 2–1 | 2025 Africa Cup of Nations qualification |
