= Nico Yennaris =

English-born Chinese footballer (born 1993)

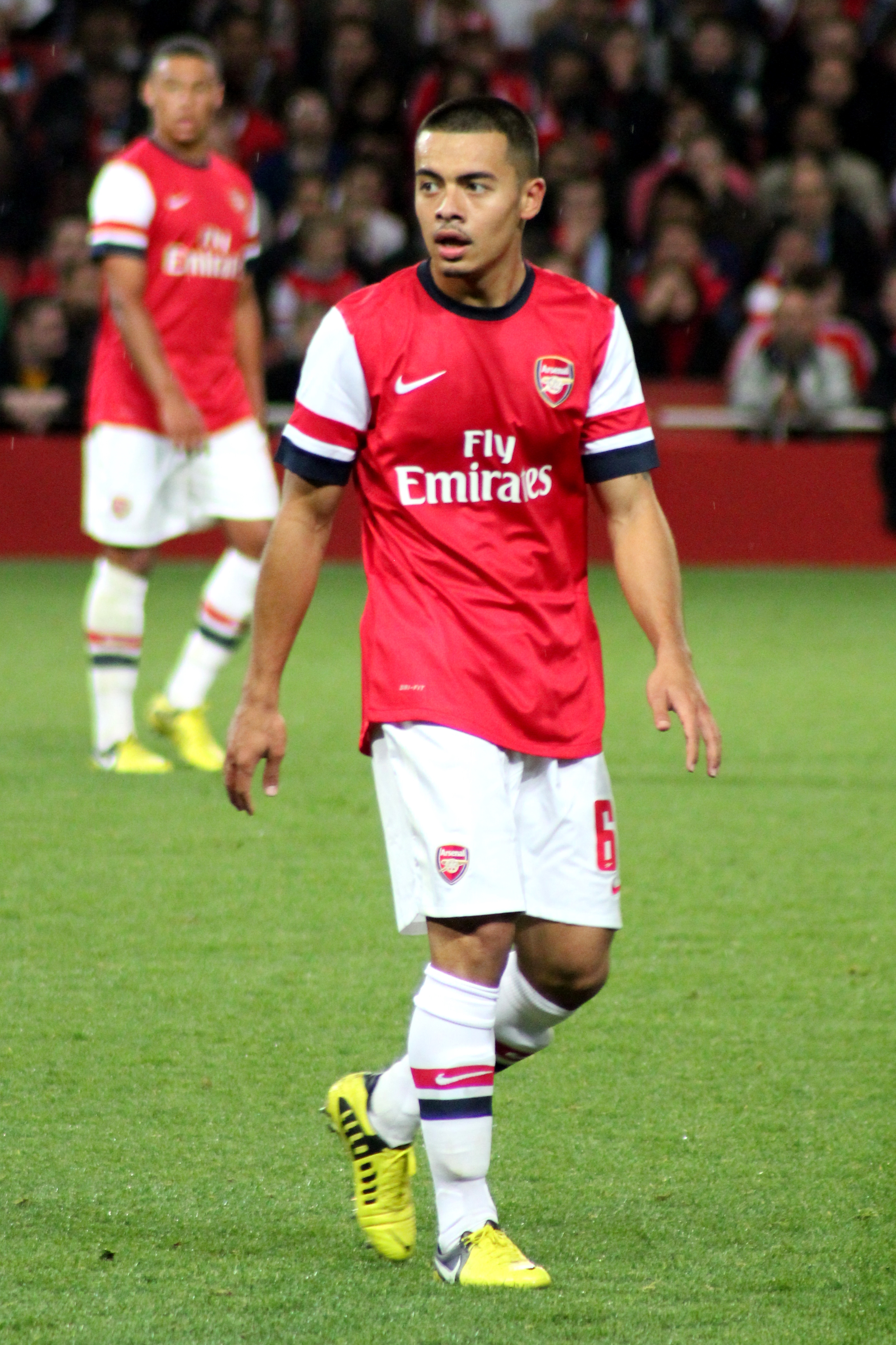
- Yennaris playing for Arsenal in 2012

Personal information
- Full name: Li Ke
- Birth name: Nicholas Harry Yennaris
- Date of birth: 24 May 1993 (age 33)
- Place of birth: Leytonstone, England
- Height: 1.75 m (5 ft 9 in)
- Positions: Defensive midfielder; full back

Team information
- Current team: Shanghai Shenhua
- Number: 8

Youth career
- –2001: Ridgeway Rovers
- 2001–2011: Arsenal

Senior career*
Years	Team	Apps	(Gls)
2011–2014	Arsenal	1	(0)
2012	→ Notts County (loan)	2	(0)
2013–2014	→ Bournemouth (loan)	0	(0)
2014–2019	Brentford	144	(12)
2015	→ Wycombe Wanderers (loan)	14	(1)
2019–2024	Beijing Guoan	86	(3)
2025–	Shanghai Shenhua	32	(0)

International career^{‡}
2009	England U17	2	(0)
2010	England U18	1	(0)
2010–2012	England U19	7	(0)
2019–	China	13	(0)
- * Club domestic league appearances and goals as of 23:36, 16 August 2026 (UTC) ‡ National team caps and goals as of 13:51, 21 July 2024 (UTC)

Nico Yennaris
- Chinese: 李可
Transcriptions
Standard Mandarin
- Hanyu Pinyin: Lǐ Kě
- IPA: [lǐkʰɤ̀]

Nicholas Harry Yennaris (born 24 May 1993), also known as Li Ke (Chinese: 李可; pinyin: Lǐ Kě), is a professional footballer who plays as a defensive midfielder for Chinese Super League club Shanghai Shenhua. Born in England, he plays for the China national team at international level.

Yennaris began his career in the academy at Premier League club Arsenal and came to prominence in the Football League with Brentford. After transferring to Beijing Guoan in 2019, Yennaris was naturalised as a Chinese citizen and took the name Li Ke. He transferred to Shanghai Shenhua in 2025. Born in England to a Chinese mother and a Greek-Cypriot father, he was eligible to represent all four nations at international level and won 10 youth caps for England. Yennaris made his senior international debut for China in late 2019. He has been described as a "rugged, all action defensive player, with a positive, winning mentality".

== Club career ==
=== Arsenal ===
==== Early career ====
After beginning his youth career with Ridgeway Rovers, Yennaris joined the Arsenal Academy in May 2001 at age seven. He began his career as a forward and as he progressed through the ranks, he was moved back into a central midfield position, before being moved to full back. Injuries halted his progress in 2008 and the club were planning to release him just weeks before he signed a two-year scholarship deal in 2009. Yennaris won his first silverware with the club when he captained the U18 team to the 2009–10 Premier Academy League title. Yennaris signed his first professional contract in July 2010, but he missed much of the 2010–11 season with a long-standing ankle problem.

==== Professional debut (2011–2014) ====
Yennaris received his maiden call into the first team squad for a League Cup third round tie versus Shrewsbury Town on 29 September 2011 and he remained an unused substitute during the 3–1 win. His first team debut came in the following round versus Bolton Wanderers, in which he played the full 90 minutes of a 2–1 win. After signing a new contract, Yennaris made two further substitute appearances before joining League One club Notts County on a youth loan in March 2012. Signing until the end of the 2011–12 season, he made two appearances before returning to Arsenal early through injury. Yennaris signed a contract extension with Arsenal during the 2012 off-season.

Yennaris was named in just two first team matchday squads during the 2012–13 and 2013–14 seasons, making one appearance. On 28 November 2013, Yennaris joined Championship club Bournemouth on loan until 2 January 2014. He was an unused substitute on three occasions and failed to make an appearance for the club. Entering the final six months of his contract, Yennaris departed Arsenal on 27 January 2014, after making only four senior appearances for the club.

==== Injury struggles (2014–2015) ====
On 27 January 2014, Yennaris transferred to League One club Brentford and signed a 2 1/2 year contract for an undisclosed fee. He made his debut in a 1–1 draw at Shrewsbury Town on 1 February, but was replaced by Adam Forshaw after suffering a dead leg on 50 minutes. After returning to fitness, he made sporadic appearances through to the end of a successful season for the Bees, in which the club secured automatic promotion to the Championship after a 1–0 victory over Preston North End on 18 April. Though he made only eight appearances during the second half of the 2013–14 season, Yennaris received a League One runners-up medal after the final match of the season against Stevenage.

Yennaris made his first appearance of the 2014–15 season in a League Cup first round match versus Dagenham & Redbridge on 12 August 2014, but lasted just 20 minutes before suffering a back injury. After recovering and then suffering a thigh injury in September, Yennaris had to wait until 3 January 2015 to make his second appearance of the season, which came in a 2–0 FA Cup third round defeat to Brighton & Hove Albion, when he replaced Alan Judge after 88 minutes. A suspension incurred by Jake Bidwell in mid-February looked to have secured an opening for Yennaris at left back, but he managed just one appearance in a 3–0 defeat to Charlton Athletic, before being dropped in favour of left midfielder Stuart Dallas.

On 27 February 2015, Yennaris joined League Two club Wycombe Wanderers on a one-month loan, which was later extended until the end of the 2014–15 season. He showed his versatility, playing in central midfield, right back and centre back for the team. He scored the first senior goal of his career in Wycombe's 3–2 final-day win over Northampton Town, which confirmed a fourth-place finish and qualification for the end-of-season playoffs. Yennaris' season ended with a shootout defeat to Southend United in the playoff final. He returned to Brentford after the match, after making 17 appearances and scoring one goal for the Chairboys.

==== Breakthrough (2015–2017) ====
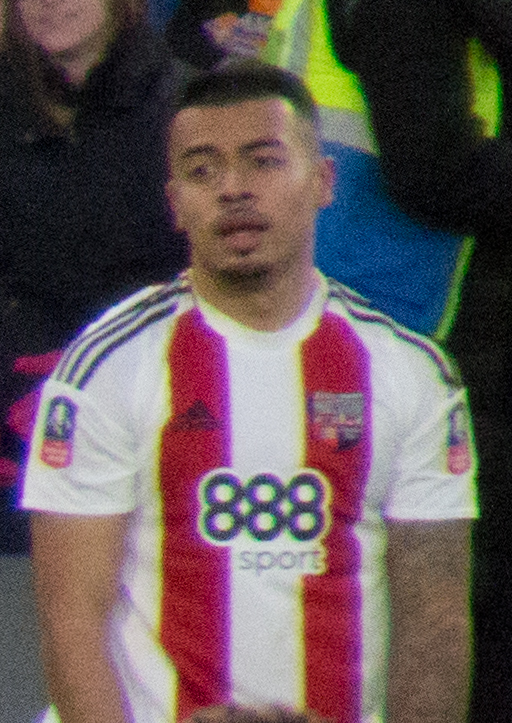
Yennaris playing for Brentford in January 2017

Yennaris made his first appearance of the 2015–16 season in the League Cup first round versus Oxford United on 11 August 2015. Starting in central midfield, he was forced off with a dead leg after 53 minutes of the 4–0 defeat. After returning to fitness, injury to regular right back Maxime Colin saw interim manager Lee Carsley bring Yennaris back to the team in early October and he held onto his place through to late-December, when Colin returned from injury. A shortage of midfielders and injury to Maxime Colin saw Yennaris regain his place in the team in mid-February 2016, with new head coach Dean Smith utilising him as a defensive midfielder and describing Yennaris as "a revelation" in the position. He signed a new three-year contract on 16 February and after over two years at the club without scoring a goal, Yennaris scored in wins over Nottingham Forest and Bolton Wanderers in early April and finished the season with 33 appearances.

Despite some injury troubles during 2016–17 pre-season and a long-standing calf problem, Yennaris was fit enough for a place on the bench versus Huddersfield Town on the opening day and after coming on for Josh McEachran in the second half, he scored his third Brentford goal on 77 minutes, though the match was eventually lost 2–1. He quickly re-established himself as a starter in defensive midfield and played through the pain of his niggling calf injury. Yennaris scored his second goal of the season on 2 January 2017, sealing a 3–1 victory over Birmingham City with a 25-yard strike. He was the club's only ever-present player during the 2016–17 season (with 49 appearances) and scored six goals. On 9 June 2017, Yennaris signed a new four-year contract.

==== Latter years (2017–2019) ====
Yennaris lost his starting central midfield place to new signing Kamohelo Mokotjo early in the 2017–18 season, but regained it in mid-August 2017 after an injury to Josh McEachran and a personal issue suffered by Ryan Woods. After Maxime Colin transferred out of the club and right backs Henrik Dalsgaard and Josh Clarke suffered injuries, Yennaris returned to the right back position in December 2017. With the departure of former captain Harlee Dean and club captain John Egan also out, Yennaris also assumed the temporary captaincy of the team. He finished the 2017–18 season with 44 appearances and four goals.

Yennaris began the 2018–19 season alternating between a starting and a substitute role, before breaking into the starting lineup in October 2018. He made 20 appearances before transferring out of the club in January 2019. During five years at Griffin Park, Yennaris made 157 appearances and scored 12 goals.

=== Beijing Guoan ===
On 31 January 2019, Yennaris transferred to Chinese Super League club Beijing Guoan for an undisclosed fee. He made 25 appearances and scored two goals during the 2019 season. Yennaris made 22 appearances without scoring during the COVID-19-affected 2020 season, which ended with a third-place play-off finish. Yennaris made just three appearances during the 2021 season (again affected by COVID-19) and in November 2021 he was forced to undergo two surgeries in London on a calf artery embolism. He missed the entire 2022 season and underwent a third surgery in London in July 2022. By December 2022, Yennaris was undertaking outdoor training at the Arsenal Training Centre and by March 2023, he had returned to fitness and signed a two-year contract extension.

Two weeks shy of two years since his previous appearance for the club, Yennaris made his first appearance of the 2023 season as a substitute for Zhang Xizhe after 76 minutes of a 3–1 defeat to Qingdao Hainiu on 25 April 2023. He finished the season with 22 appearances in all competitions. Ahead of the 2024 season, Yennaris signed a contract extension. He made 24 appearances and scored one goal during the 2024 season, in which the club narrowly missed out on AFC Champions League Two qualification. Yennaris was released at the end of the 2024 season, when his contract expired. His six-season career with the club ended on 98 appearances and three goals.

=== Shanghai Shenhua ===
On 8 January 2025, Yennaris signed a one-year contract with Chinese Super League club Shanghai Shenhua on a free transfer. His first competitive match involvement came as an unused substitute in the victorious 2025 Chinese FA Super Cup squad. Yennaris made 37 appearances during a 2025 season in which the club finished as Chinese Super League runners-up. Yennaris made seven appearances during the first half of the 2026 season, prior to undergoing calf vascular bypass surgery in London in July 2026.

== International career ==
Yennaris represented England at U17, U18 and U19 level. He made two appearances during the U17s' successful 2009 Nordic Tournament campaign. His solitary U18 cap came with a starting appearance in a 3–0 friendly win over Poland on 16 November 2010. Yennaris played in six friendlies for the U19s in late 2011 and early 2012, which were scheduled after the team received a bye to the elite round of the 2012 European U19 Championship qualifying. The friendly matches included three appearances at the 2011 Limoges Tournament, which England won. He was also eligible to represent China, Greece and Cyprus at international level.

On 30 May 2019, Yennaris made history by becoming the first ever naturalised player to be called up by China and he made his senior international debut with a start in a 2–0 friendly victory over the Philippines on 7 June 2019. He won five further caps during the remainder of the year. As a result of the COVID-19 pandemic and long-term injuries, Yennaris was only capped once more between November 2019 and September 2023. He won a recall to the international team and won six caps in a mixture of friendlies and 2026 World Cup qualifiers between September and November 2023. Yennaris was named in China's 2023 AFC Asian Cup squad, but family reasons led to his withdrawal.

== Personal life ==
Yennaris was born in Leytonstone, London to a father of Greek Cypriot origin and a mother of Chinese Hakka origin. His Chinese name is Li Ke (Chinese: 李可; pinyin: Lǐ Kě).

Yennaris is an Arsenal supporter and was a mascot for a match at Highbury versus Coventry City on 16 September 2000.

== Career statistics ==
=== Club ===
As of match played 15 August 2026

Appearances and goals by club, season and competition
Club	Season	League			National cup (Note: Includes FA Cup, Chinese FA Cup)		League cup (Note: Includes EFL Cup)		Continental		Other		Total	
Club	Season	Division	Apps	Goals	Apps	Goals	Apps	Goals	Apps	Goals	Apps	Goals	Apps	Goals
Arsenal	2011–12	Premier League	1	0	1	0	1	0	0	0	—		3	0
Arsenal	2012–13	Premier League	0	0	0	0	1	0	0	0	—		1	0
Arsenal	2013–14	Premier League	0	0	0	0	0	0	0	0	—		0	0
Arsenal	Total		1	0	1	0	2	0	0	0	—		4	0
Notts County (loan)	2011–12	League One	2	0	—		—		—		—		2	0
Bournemouth (loan)	2012–13	Championship	0	0	0	0	—		—		—		0	0
Brentford	2013–14	League One	8	0	—		—		—		—		8	0
Brentford	2014–15	Championship	1	0	1	0	1	0	—		0	0	3	0
Brentford	2015–16	Championship	31	2	1	0	1	0	—		—		33	2
Brentford	2016–17	Championship	46	6	2	0	1	0	—		—		49	6
Brentford	2017–18	Championship	41	4	0	0	3	0	—		—		44	4
Brentford	2018–19	Championship	17	0	0	0	3	0	—		—		20	0
Brentford	Total		144	12	4	0	9	0	—		0	0	157	12
Wycombe Wanderers (loan)	2014–15	League Two	14	1	—		—		—		3 (Note: Appearances in League Two play-offs)	0	17	1
Beijing Guoan	2019	Chinese Super League	25	2	2	0	—		0	0	0	0	27	2
Beijing Guoan	2020	Chinese Super League	16	0	1	0	—		5 (Note: Appearances in AFC Champions League Elite)	0	—		22	0
Beijing Guoan	2021	Chinese Super League	3	0	0	0	—		0	0	—		3	0
Beijing Guoan	2022	Chinese Super League	0	0	0	0	—		—		—		0	0
Beijing Guoan	2023	Chinese Super League	19	0	3	0	—		—		—		22	0
Beijing Guoan	2024	Chinese Super League	23	1	1	0	—		—		—		24	1
Beijing Guoan	Total		86	3	7	0	—		5	0	0	0	98	3
Shanghai Shenhua	2025	Chinese Super League	28	0	2	0	—		7	0	0	0	37	0
Shanghai Shenhua	2026	Chinese Super League	4	0	0	0	—		3	0	—		7	0
Shanghai Shenhua	Total		32	3	2	0	—		10	0	0	0	44	3
Career total			277	16	14	0	11	0	15	0	3	0	320	16

=== International ===
As of match played 1 January 2024

Appearances and goals by national team and year
National team	Year	Apps	Goals
China	2019	6	0
China	2020	0	0
China	2021	1	0
China	2022	0	0
China	2023	6	0
Total		13	0

== Honours ==
Arsenal Youth

- Premier Academy League: 2009–10

Shanghai Shenhua

- Chinese FA Super Cup: 2025

England U17

- Nordic Tournament: 2009

England U19

- Limoges Tournament: 2011

== See also ==
- List of Chinese naturalized footballers
