= Li Songyi =

Chinese footballer

Li Songyi 李松益
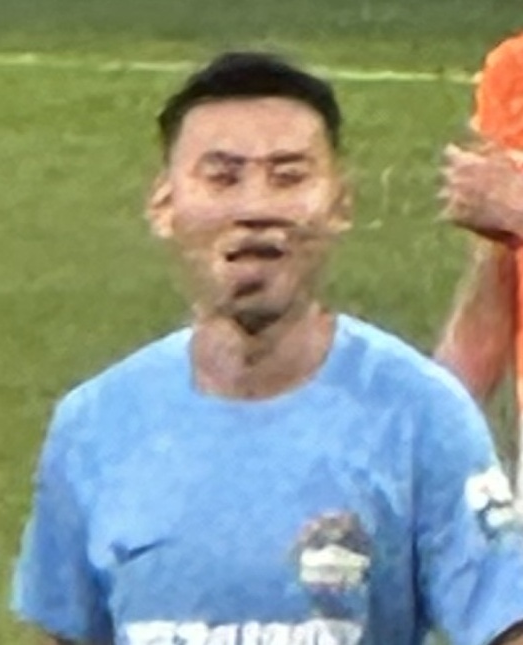
- Li Songyi in August 2024

Personal information
- Date of birth: January 27, 1993 (age 33)
- Place of birth: Xuzhou, Jiangsu, China
- Height: 1.83 m (6 ft 0 in)
- Position: Defender

Team information
- Current team: Shanghai Shenhua
- Number: 6

Youth career
- Luneng Taishan Football School

Senior career*
Years	Team	Apps	(Gls)
2011	Shandong Youth	14	(1)
2012–2021	Shandong Luneng	50	(1)
2020	→ Guangzhou R&F (loan)	9	(0)
2021	→ Tianjin Jinmen Tiger (loan)	17	(1)
2022	Kunshan FC	24	(3)
2023–2024	Henan FC	40	(1)
2025–2026	Yunnan Yukun	21	(1)
2026–	Shanghai Shenhua	0	(0)

International career
2010–2012	China U20	13	(0)
	China U23	8	(0)
- * Club domestic league appearances and goals as of 2 November 2025

Li Songyi (Chinese: 李松益; pinyin: Lǐ Sōngyì; born 27 January 1993) is a Chinese football player who currently plays as a defender for Shanghai Shenhua.

== Club career ==
After playing in the youth squad of Shandong Luneng Taishan, Li started his professional football career in 2011. He played for Shandong Youth (Shandong Luneng youth team) in the China League Two and made 14 appearances in the season. On 27 July, he scored his first league goal in a 3–1 home victory against Xi'an Laochenggen. Li was promoted to Shandong Luneng's first team squad by Henk ten Cate in 2012. He made his Super League debut on 23 June 2012, coming on as a substitute for Wang Gang in the 86th minute in a 3–1 home victory against Shanghai Shenxin. Often used as a squad player throughout his time at Shandong, he would go on to be loaned out to fellow top tier clubs in Guangzhou R&F on 5 January 2020 and Tianjin Jinmen on 12 April 2021.

On 29 April 2022, Li would join second tier second tier club Kunshan FC on a free transfer. He would make his debut in a league game on 13 June 2022 against Shaanxi Chang'an Athletic in a 0-0 draw. He would go on to establish himself as regular within the team that won the division and promotion to the top tier at the end of the 2022 China League One campaign.

On 19 January 2025, Li joined Chinese Super League club Yunnan Yukun.

on 4 July 2026, Li transferred to Chinese Super League side Shanghai Shenhua.

== International career ==
Li received his first called up for China U-20's squad by Su Maozhen in December 2010. He continued to play for China U-20 in the 2011 Granatkin Memorial, 2011 Toulon Tournament, 2011 Weifang Cup. He made 3 appearances in the 2012 AFC U-19 Championship qualification and was sent out in the last match which China lost to Australia U-20 3–0.

== Career statistics ==
Statistics accurate as of match played 2 November 2025.

Appearances and goals by club, season and competition
Club	Season	League			National Cup		Continental		Other		Total	
Club	Season	Division	Apps	Goals	Apps	Goals	Apps	Goals	Apps	Goals	Apps	Goals
Shandong Youth	2011	China League Two	14	1	-		-		-		14	1
Shandong Luneng Taishan	2012	Chinese Super League	1	0	0	0	-		-		1	0
Shandong Luneng Taishan	2013	Chinese Super League	4	0	2	0	-		-		6	0
Shandong Luneng Taishan	2014	Chinese Super League	1	0	1	0	0	0	-		2	0
Shandong Luneng Taishan	2015	Chinese Super League	11	0	3	1	2	0	-		16	1
Shandong Luneng Taishan	2016	Chinese Super League	16	0	3	0	1	0	-		20	0
Shandong Luneng Taishan	2017	Chinese Super League	17	1	3	1	-		-		20	2
Shandong Luneng Taishan	2018	Chinese Super League	0	0	1	2	-		-		1	2
Shandong Luneng Taishan	2019	Chinese Super League	0	0	0	0	-		-		0	0
Shandong Luneng Taishan	Total		50	1	13	4	3	0	0	0	66	5
Guangzhou R&F (loan)	2020	Chinese Super League	9	0	0	0	-		-		9	0
Tianjin Jinmen Tiger (loan)	2021	Chinese Super League	17	1	1	0	-		-		18	1
Kunshan FC	2022	China League One	24	3	0	0	-		-		24	3
Henan	2023	Chinese Super League	19	1	2	0	-		-		21	1
Henan	2024	Chinese Super League	21	0	3	0	-		-		24	0
Henan	Total		40	1	5	0	0	0	0	0	45	1
Yunnan Yukun	2025	Chinese Super League	20	1	2	0	-		-		22	1
Career total			174	8	21	4	3	0	0	0	198	12

== Honours ==
Shandong Luneng

- Chinese FA Cup: 2014

Kunshan

- China League One: 2022
