= Zhang Wei (footballer, born 2000) =

Chinese association football player

Zhang Wei 张威
Personal information
- Date of birth: 16 May 2000 (age 26)
- Place of birth: Heze, Shandong, China
- Height: 1.86 m (6 ft 1 in)
- Position: Forward

Team information
- Current team: Shanghai Shenhua

Senior career*
Years	Team	Apps	(Gls)
2019–2022	Hebei FC	40	(8)
2023–	Shanghai Shenhua	11	(0)
2024	→ Qingdao Hainiu (loan)	20	(0)
2025	→ Tianjin Jinmen Tiger (loan)	1	(0)
2025	→ Guangxi Pingguo (loan)	9	(2)

International career
2023	China U23	8	(0)
- * Club domestic league appearances and goals as of 7 July 2023

Zhang Wei (simplified Chinese: 张威; traditional Chinese: 張威; pinyin: Zhāng Wēi; born 16 May 2000) is a Chinese professional footballer who plays as a forward for Chinese Super League club Shanghai Shenhua.

== Club career ==
Zhang Wei was promoted to the senior team of Hebei China Fortune (later renamed as Hebei) within the 2019 Chinese Super League season and would make his debut in a league game on 1 June 2019 against Guangzhou R&F F.C. in a 2–2 draw. On 28 July 2021, he scored his first senior goal in a league game over Dalian Professional in a 1–0 victory. He would start to go on to establish himself as a regular within the team. At the end of the 2022 Chinese Super League campaign he was part of the team that was relegated at the end of the campaign. On 7 April 2023, Hebei announced that operations were going to cease immediately due to financial difficulties.

On 11 April 2023, Zhang joined top tier club Shanghai Shenhua for the start of the 2023 Chinese Super League campaign. He would make his debut for the club in a league game on 16 April 2023 against Shandong Taishan in a 1–0 victory.

On 08 January 2025, Zhang was loaned to another top tier club Tianjin Jinmen Tiger.

== Career statistics ==
As of 16 April 2023.

Club	Season	League			Cup		Continental		Other		Total	
Club	Season	Division	Apps	Goals	Apps	Goals	Apps	Goals	Apps	Goals	Apps	Goals
Hebei China Fortune/ Hebei FC	2019	Chinese Super League	2	0	0	0	–		–		2	0
Hebei China Fortune/ Hebei FC	2020	Chinese Super League	3	0	1	0	–		–		4	0
Hebei China Fortune/ Hebei FC	2021	Chinese Super League	14	2	1	0	–		–		15	2
Hebei China Fortune/ Hebei FC	2022	Chinese Super League	21	6	1	0	–		–		22	6
Hebei China Fortune/ Hebei FC	Total		40	8	3	0	0	0	0	0	43	8
Shanghai Shenhua	2023	Chinese Super League	1	0	0	0	–		–		1	0
Career total			41	8	3	0	0	0	0	0	44	8

== Honours ==
Shanghai Shenhua

- Chinese FA Cup: 2023
