= Xie Weijun =

Chinese footballer (born 1997)

Xie Weijun 谢维军
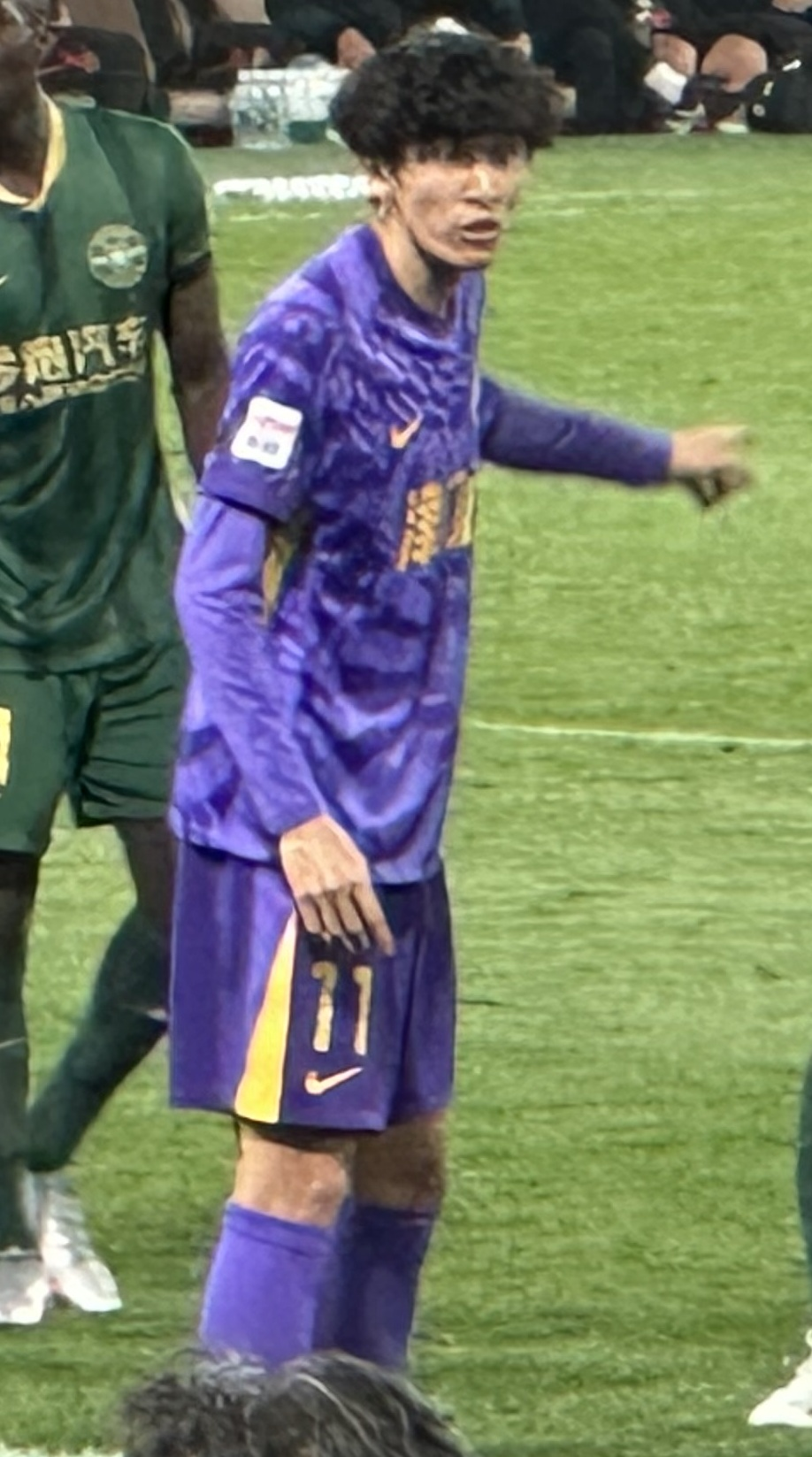
- Xie Weijun in April 2025

Personal information
- Full name: Xie Weijun
- Date of birth: 14 November 1997 (age 29)
- Place of birth: Guangzhou, Guangdong, China
- Height: 1.92 m (6 ft 3 1/2 in)
- Position: Striker

Team information
- Current team: Tianjin Jinmen Tiger
- Number: 11

Youth career
- 2013–2018: Guangzhou Evergrande
- 2016–2017: → Zhuhai Suoka (loan)

Senior career*
Years	Team	Apps	(Gls)
2017	→ Lhasa UCI (loan)	2	(1)
2018–	Tianjin Jinmen Tiger	198	(18)

International career^{‡}
2018–2019	China U-23	12	(2)
2023–	China	1	(0)
- * Club domestic league appearances and goals as of 22 November 2026 ‡ National team caps and goals as of 10 October 2023

Xie Weijun (Chinese: 谢维军; pinyin: Xiè Wéijūn; born 14 November 1997) is a Chinese professional footballer who plays as a striker for Chinese Super League club Tianjin Jinmen Tiger and the China national team. He is the son of Chinese former international Xie Yuxin.

== Club career ==
Xie Weijun joined Chinese Super League side Tianjin TEDA (later renamed Tianjin Jinmen Tiger) from Guangzhou Evergrande Taobao on 28 February 2018. However, he failed to register for the senior league match due to the contract dispute between Guangzhou Evergrande Taobao and Zhuhai Suoka. He was promoted to Tianjin TEDA's first team squad in June 2018 after the settlement of dispute. On 18 July 2018, he made his senior debut in a 1–0 away defeat to Shanghai Greenland Shenhua, coming on as a substitute for Cao Yang in the 84th minute. He scored his first senior goal on 5 August 2018, the winner in a 2–1 away win over Hebei China Fortune, one minute after coming on as a substitute.

== International career ==
On 10 October 2023, Xie made his international debut by coming on as a late substitute in a 2–0 home win against Vietnam in an international friendly game.

== Personal life ==
Xie Weijun's father, Xie Yuxin, is a former professional footballer who most notably played for various Guangdong clubs and the China national team.

== Career statistics ==
As of 31 December 2025.

Appearances and goals by club, season and competition
Club	Season	League			National Cup		Continental		Other		Total	
Club	Season	Division	Apps	Goals	Apps	Goals	Apps	Goals	Apps	Goals	Apps	Goals
Lhasa UCI (loan)	2017	China Amateur Football League	2	1	–		–		–		2	1
Tianjin Jinmen Tiger	2018	Chinese Super League	15	2	0	0	-		-		15	2
Tianjin Jinmen Tiger	2019	Chinese Super League	23	1	3	1	-		-		26	2
Tianjin Jinmen Tiger	2020	Chinese Super League	11	0	1	0	-		-		12	0
Tianjin Jinmen Tiger	2021	Chinese Super League	17	1	2	0	-		-		19	1
Tianjin Jinmen Tiger	2022	Chinese Super League	28	7	1	2	-		-		29	9
Tianjin Jinmen Tiger	2023	Chinese Super League	27	5	3	2	-		-		30	7
Tianjin Jinmen Tiger	2024	Chinese Super League	24	1	2	1	-		-		26	2
Tianjin Jinmen Tiger	2025	Chinese Super League	30	1	2	0	-		-		32	1
Tianjin Jinmen Tiger	Total		175	18	14	6	0	0	0	0	189	24
Career total			177	19	14	6	0	0	0	0	191	25
