= Hu Yongfa =

Chinese association football player

Personal information
- Date of birth: 20 September 1993 (age 33)
- Place of birth: Wuhua County, Meizhou, Guangdong
- Height: 1.80 m (5 ft 11 in)
- Position: Defender

Team information
- Current team: Ji'nan Xingzhou (on loan from Chengdu Rongcheng)

Youth career
- –2013: Shenzhen Fengpeng
- 2014: Guangzhou R&F
- 2014–2016: Shanghai Shenxin

Senior career*
Years	Team	Apps	(Gls)
2016	Shanghai Shenxin	2	(0)
2017–2020	Guangdong South China Tiger	79	(6)
2020–	Chengdu Rongcheng	36	(4)
2022-	→ Ji'nan Xingzhou (loan)	11	(0)
- * Club domestic league appearances and goals as of 14:01, 8 January 2023 (UTC)

Hu Yongfa (Chinese: 胡勇发; born 20 September 1993) is a Chinese footballer currently playing as a defender for Ji'nan Xingzhou, on loan from Chengdu Rongcheng.

== Club career ==
Hu Yongfa would play for the Shanghai Shenxin youth team before being promoted to their senior team in the 2016 China League One season. After only one campaign and a chance to return to Guangdong he joined third tier club Guangdong South China Tiger on 18 January 2017. In his debut season he would establish himself as a vital member of the team that came runners-up in the division and promotion to the second tier.

After three seasons at Guangdong South China Tiger the club dissolved due to wage arrears and Hu Yongfa joined another second tier club in Chengdu Rongcheng. After two seasons with the club he would establish himself as a regular within the team and aid them to promotion at the end of the 2021 league campaign.

== Career statistics ==
As of 8 January 2023.

Club	Season	League			Cup		Continental		Other		Total	
Club	Season	Division	Apps	Goals	Apps	Goals	Apps	Goals	Apps	Goals	Apps	Goals
Shanghai Shenxin	2016	China League One	2	0	2	0	–		–		4	0
Meixian Techand/ Guangdong South China Tiger	2017	China League Two	21	1	2	0	–		–		23	1
Meixian Techand/ Guangdong South China Tiger	2018	China League One	29	2	0	0	–		2 (Note: Appearance(s) in the China League One relegation playoffs)	0	31	2
Meixian Techand/ Guangdong South China Tiger	2019	China League One	29	3	0	0	–		–		29	3
Meixian Techand/ Guangdong South China Tiger	Total		79	6	2	0	0	0	2	0	83	6
Chengdu Better City/ Chengdu Rongcheng	2020	China League One	11	0	1	0	–		–		12	0
Chengdu Better City/ Chengdu Rongcheng	2021	China League One	25	4	3	0	–		1 (Note: Appearance(s) in CSL Relegation play-offs)	0	29	4
Chengdu Better City/ Chengdu Rongcheng	Total		36	4	4	0	0	0	1	0	41	4
Ji'nan Xingzhou (loan)	2022	China League Two	11	0	1	0	–		–		12	0
Career total			128	10	8	0	0	0	3	0	140	10
