= Zhao Jianbo (footballer) =

Chinese association football player

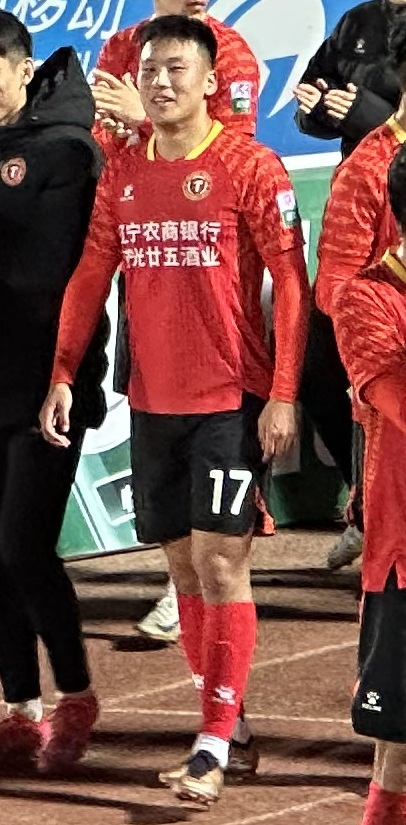
- Zhao Jianbo in April 2025

Personal information
- Date of birth: 17 May 2001 (age 25)
- Place of birth: Dalian, Liaoning, China
- Height: 1.82 m (6 ft 0 in)
- Position: Forward

Team information
- Current team: Guizhou Guiyang Athletic (on loan from Dalian K'un City)
- Number: 3

Youth career
- Villarreal
- –2020: Dalian Pro

Senior career*
Years	Team	Apps	(Gls)
2020–2023	Dalian Pro	21	(1)
2024	Yunnan Yukun	13	(1)
2025	Liaoning Tieren	14	(0)
2026–	Dalian K'un City	4	(0)
2026–	→ Guizhou Guiyang Athletic (loan)	0	(0)

International career
2023	China U22		
- * Club domestic league appearances and goals as of 14:47, 31 December 2022 (UTC)

Zhao Jianbo (Chinese: 赵健博; born 17 May 2001) is a Chinese footballer currently playing as a forward for Guizhou Guiyang Athletic, on loan from Dalian K'un City.

== Club career ==
Zhao Jianbo was selected by the Wanda Group youth player project, and gained a chance to train with Spanish club Villarreal CF in 2013. On his return to China he would join Wanda Group owned Dalian Yifang's youth team. With them, he would win the under-19 championship title in 2018. He would go on to be promoted to the senior team in the 2020 Chinese Super League campaign. He made his professional debut on 25 August 2020 in a league game against Guangzhou Evergrande that ended in a 2–2 draw. He would go on to score his first goal on 14 December 2022 in a league game against Wuhan Three Towns in a 2–1 defeat.

On 10 January 2025, Zhao joined China League One club Liaoning Tieren.

On 11 February 2026, Zhao joined China League One club Dalian K'un City.

On 26 June 2026, Zhao was loaned to China League Two club Guizhou Guiyang Athletic for the rest of 2026 season.

== Career statistics ==
As of 31 December 2022.

Club	Season	League			Cup		Continental		Other		Total	
Club	Season	Division	Apps	Goals	Apps	Goals	Apps	Goals	Apps	Goals	Apps	Goals
Dalian Pro	2020	Chinese Super League	2	0	1	0	–		–		3	0
Dalian Pro	2021	Chinese Super League	8	0	4	0	–		1 (Note: Appearance(s) Promotion/Relegation Play-offs)	0	13	0
Dalian Pro	2022	Chinese Super League	11	1	0	0	–		–		11	1
Dalian Pro	Total		21	1	5	0	0	0	1	0	27	1
Career total			21	1	5	0	0	0	1	0	27	1

== Honours ==
Liaoning Tieren

- China League One: 2025
