= Huang Ming =

Huang Ming may refer to:

- Huang Ming (皇明), a name for the Ming dynasty
- Huang Ming (politician) (黄明; born 1957), Deputy Minister of Public Security of China
- Huang Ming (military officer) (黄铭; born 1963), Deputy Commander of the People's Liberation Army Ground Force.
- Huang Ming (entrepreneur) (黄鸣; born 1958), founder of Himin Solar
- Huang Ming (actor) (黄明; born 1986), an actor from China.
