= Fei Ernanduo =

Chinese footballer (born 2001)

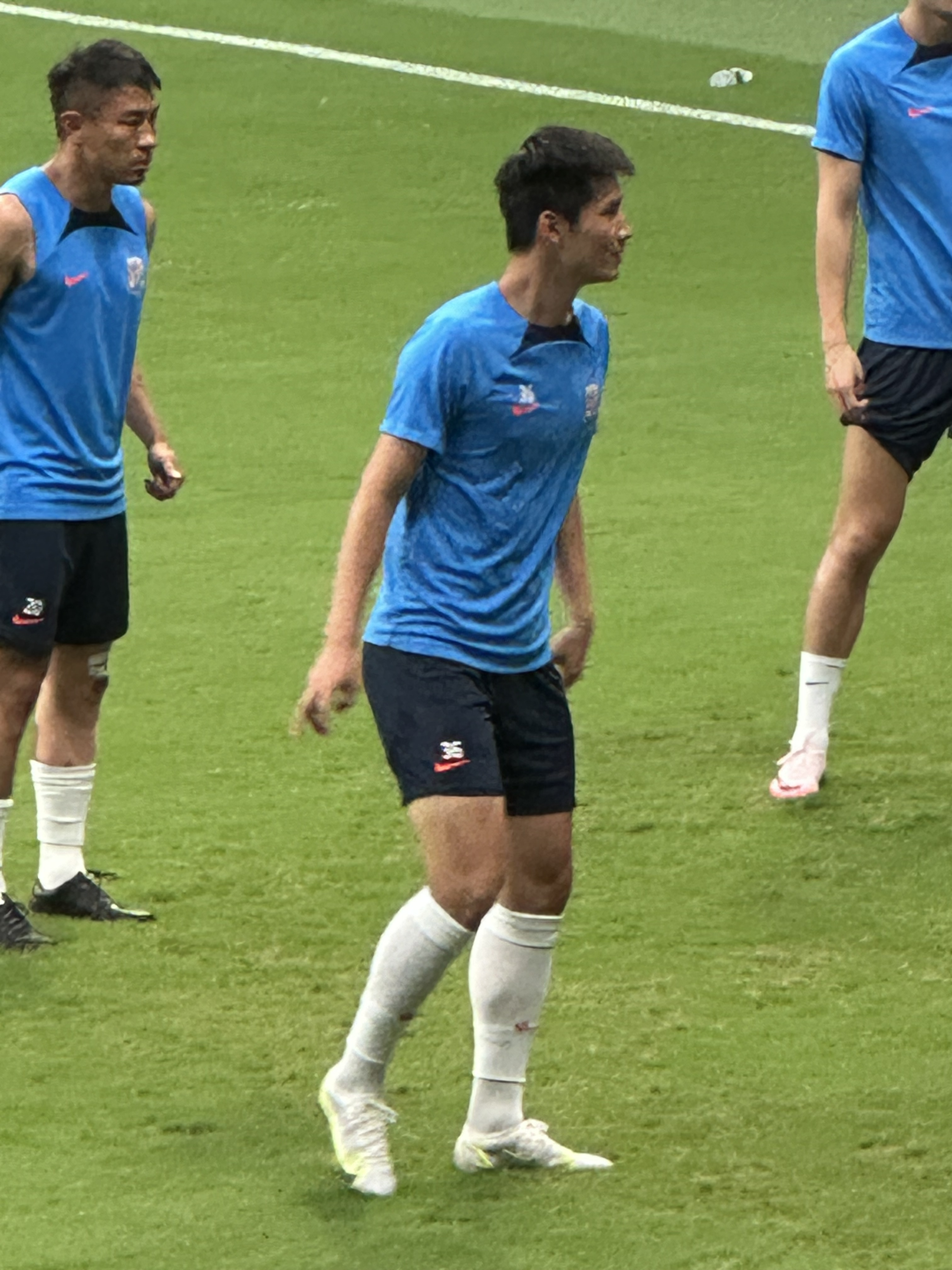
- Fei Ernanduo in August 2024

Personal information
- Date of birth: 20 July 2001 (age 25)
- Place of birth: Huai'an, Anhui, China
- Height: 1.86 m (6 ft 1 in)
- Position: Forward

Team information
- Current team: Yunnan Yukun
- Number: 36

Senior career*
Years	Team	Apps	(Gls)
2022–2025	Shanghai Shenhua	3	(0)
2025	→ Guangxi Hengchen (loan)	22	(19)
2026–	Yunnan Yukun	7	(0)
- * Club domestic league appearances and goals as of 19 November 2026

Fei Ernanduo (Chinese: 费尔南多; pinyin: Fèi Ěrnánduō; born 20 July 2001) is a Chinese professional footballer who plays as a forward for Chinese Super League club Yunnan Yukun.

== Early life ==
Fei's grandfather named him Fei Ernanduo, the Chinese transliteration of the Spanish and Portuguese name Fernando, while Fei and his family are fully Chinese. attended the No. 1 Central Primary School in Gulou District, Nanjing, Jiangsu.

== Career ==
On 4 January 2023, Fei debuted for Chinese side Shanghai Shenhua and scored his first goal for the club during a 5–1 win over Cangzhou Mighty Lions.

On 5 January 2026, Fei joined Chinese Super League club Yunnan Yukun.

== Personal life ==
Fei has regarded South Korea international Kim Shin-wook as his football idol.

== Honours ==
Shanghai Shenhua

- Chinese FA Cup: 2023
- Chinese FA Super Cup: 2024
