= Zhu Yue (footballer) =

Chinese association football player

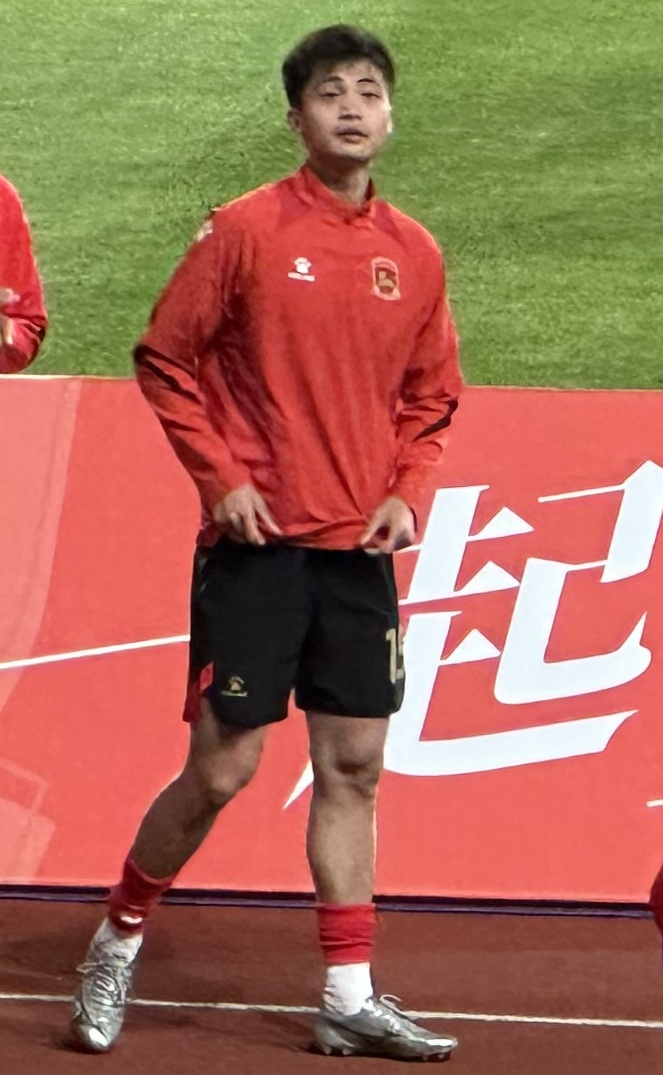
- Zhu Yue in May 2025

Personal information
- Date of birth: 4 May 2001 (age 25)
- Place of birth: Yancheng, Jiangsu, China
- Height: 1.85 m (6 ft 1 in)
- Position: Defender

Team information
- Current team: Shanghai Shenhua
- Number: 25

Youth career
- –2020: Shanghai Shenhua

Senior career*
Years	Team	Apps	(Gls)
2020–	Shanghai Shenhua	8	(0)
2021	→ China U20 (loan)	6	(0)
2024	→ Cangzhou Mighty Lions (loan)	7	(0)
2025	→ Suzhou Dongwu (loan)	4	(0)
2025	→ Guangxi Pingguo (loan)	13	(1)

International career^{‡}
2018	China U16	6	(0)
2019	China U18	1	(0)
2022–2024	China U23	7	(0)
- * Club domestic league appearances and goals as of 31 January 2023 (UTC) ‡ National team caps and goals as of 14:01, 28 July 2021 (UTC)

Zhu Yue (Chinese: 朱越; born 4 May 2001) is a Chinese footballer currently playing as a defender for Shanghai Shenhua.

== Club career ==
Zhu Yue would play for the Shanghai Shenhua youth team before being promoted to the senior team at the beginning of the 2020 Chinese Super League season. He would go on to make his debut in a league game on 10 November 2020 in a 1–0 victory against Hebei China Fortune. The following season he would be loaned out to the Chinese U20 team who were allowed to participate within the 2021 China League Two campaign.

== Career statistics ==
As of match played 31 December 2025.

Appearances and goals by club, season and competition
Club	Season	League			Cup		Continental		Other		Total	
Club	Season	Division	Apps	Goals	Apps	Goals	Apps	Goals	Apps	Goals	Apps	Goals
Shanghai Shenhua	2020	Chinese Super League	1	0	0	0	4 (Note: Appearances in the AFC Champions League)	0	–		5	0
Shanghai Shenhua	2022	Chinese Super League	1	0	3	0	–		–		4	0
Shanghai Shenhua	2023	Chinese Super League	6	0	1	0	–		–		7	0
Shanghai Shenhua	2026	Chinese Super League	0	0	0	0	–		–		0	0
Shanghai Shenhua	Total		8	0	4	0	4	0	0	0	16	0
China U20 (loan)	2021	China League Two	6	0	0	0	–		0	0	6	0
Cangzhou Mighty Lions (loan)	2024	Chinese Super League	7	0	–		–		–		7	0
Suzhou Dongwu (loan)	2025	China League One	4	0	2	0	–		–		6	0
Guangxi Pingguo (loan)	2025	China League One	13	1	–		–		–		13	1
Career total			38	1	6	0	4	0	0	0	47	1
